= 2024 Vermont Catamounts men's soccer team =

2024 Vermont Catamounts men's soccer

NCAA tournament College Cup National Champions AEC tournament champions

National Championship Game, W 2–1^{OT} vs. Marshall
- Conference: America East Conference
- U. Soc. Coaches poll: No. 17
- Record: 16–2–6 (6–1–2 AEC)
- Head coach: Rob Dow (8th season)
- Assistant coaches: Brad Cole (2nd season); Rory Twomey (2nd season)
- Home stadium: Virtue Field

2024 America East Conference men's soccer standings
	Conf.					Overall
Team	W		L		T	W		L		T
New Hampshire	4	–	1	–	2	7	–	3	–	7
No. 1 Vermont ‡	4	–	1	–	2	16	–	2	–	6
UMBC	4	–	2	–	1	8	–	7	–	4
Bryant	4	–	3	–	0	11	–	5	–	4
NJIT	2	–	3	–	2	6	–	8	–	4
Binghamton	2	–	3	–	2	8	–	7	–	4
UMass Lowell	1	–	4	–	2	6	–	5	–	5
Albany	1	–	5	–	1	4	–	12	–	2
‡ – AEC tournament champion + – At-large invitation to the 2024 NCAA tournament; As of December 17, 2024; Rankings from United Soccer Coaches; Source: America East

The 2024 Vermont Catamounts men's soccer team represented the University of Vermont during the 2024 NCAA Division I men's soccer season. They were led by head coach Rob Dow, in his eighth season. They played their home games at Virtue Field. This was the team's 60th season playing organized men's college soccer and their 36th playing in the America East Conference.

Regarded as the program's best season in its history, the Catamounts started the season with a loss to ranked Western Michigan and a draw with UC Irvine. These results saw them fall from their preseason ranking of fourteenth to unranked the following week. Despite a slow start, they followed it up with not losing a game for 11 decisions, going 8–0–3, with conference wins over Bryant and rival Albany. They started conference play with a tie to New Hampshire. They would go on to win their next three conference games before their first conference loss against UMBC on October 26. That match would be the last match that Vermont would lose for the remainder of the season. They would follow that with a win and a draw to close out the regular season with a 9–2–5 overall record and a 4–1–2 AEC record. The Catamounts were the second overall seed in the AEC tournament. They defeated third seed UMBC in the Semi-Finals and fourth seed Bryant in the Finals where Vermont won their seventh AEC tournament title.

The tournament victory earned Vermont the AEC's automatic bid to the NCAA Tournament. Vermont, however, were not ranked. Despite this, the Catamounts went on a Cinderella run, defeating Iona in the first round, seventh seed Hofstra in the second round, San Diego in the third round, and second seed Pittsburgh in the Quarterfinals to reach the College Cup. A victory over third seed Denver saw them reach the national title match against Marshall. Vermont would go on to defeat Marshall in overtime and win the national title 2–1. The national title was the first in program history as well as the first NCAA team championship in school history.

== Background ==
The Catamounts finished the previous season 13–6–2 overall and 4–3–0 in AEC play to finish in fourth place in the conference. Despite being the fourth overall seed in the AEC Tournament, they were defeated by NJIT in the Quarterfinals. They were given a bid to the NCAA Tournament and were unranked. However, they defeated Rider in the first round, upset twelfth seed UCF in the second round, before losing to fifth seed West Virginia in the third round.

== Transfers ==
=== Players leaving ===
Note: This column lists players who left the program before the 2024 season. It does not include those who departed before the 2023-24 season. Only players who exited during the offseason leading up to the 2024 season or just before it began are included here.

2024 transfers from the Vermont Catamounts
No.	Name	Pos.	Height	Weight	Year	Hometown	Reason for Departure
2	Daniel Pacella	Midfielder	5′ 10″	170	Senior	Montreal, Quebec (CAN)	Transferred to San Diego State
35	Jacob Vitale	Midfielder	5′ 9″	175	Senior	Rochester, New York (USA)	Transferred to Fairfield
6	Jake Ashford	Defender	6′ 2″	165	Senior	Shawnee, Kansas (USA)	Graduated
17	Ryan Combe	Midfielder	5′ 11″	145	Senior	York, Maine (USA)	Graduated
14	Noe Coutino	Left Winger	5′ 11″	161	Sophomore	Ciudad Juárez, Mexico (MEX)	Left program
13	Carter Johnson	Midfielder	5′ 11″	166	Senior	Sandy, Utah (USA)	Graduated

=== Players arriving ===
2024 transfers to the Vermont Catamounts
No.	Name	Pos.	Height	Weight	Year	Hometown	Previous School
0	Lou Liedtka	Goalkeeper	6′ 0″	175	Graduate Student	Wyncote, Pennsylvania	Davidson
2	Nathan Simeon	Defender	5′ 11″	175	Graduate Student	Montreal, Quebec	San Francisco
3	Mike Bleeker	Defender	6′ 0″	190	Graduate Student	Wayne, New Jersey	American
9	Maximilian Kissel	Forward	6′ 0″	150	Junior	Wiesbaden, Germany	Bridgeport
14	Ethan Czaporowski	Forward	5′ 8″	160	(redshirt) Sophomore	Belchertown, Massachusetts	Virginia Tech

==== Recruiting class ====
2024 Vermont Catamounts incoming transfers
Nat.	Name	Pos.	Hometown	High School	TDS Rating
USA	Ryan Zellefrow	Forward	Berwyn, Pennsylvania	Conestoga High School	3/5 stars

== Squad ==
=== Roster ===
As of January 21, 2025

Note: Flags indicate national team as defined under FIFA eligibility rules; some limited exceptions apply. Players may hold more than one non-FIFA nationality.

2024 Vermont Catamounts roster
No.	Name	Nationality	Position	Age	Committed	Previous club
0	Lou Liedtka	United States	GK	24	2024	University of Davidson (USA)
1	Niklas Herceg	Germany	GK	22	2024	VfL 08 Vichttal (GER)
2	Nathan Simeon	Canada	DF	26	2024	University of San Francisco (USA)
3	Mike Bleeker	United States	DF	–	2024	American University (USA)
4	Cole Richardson	United States	DF	–	2021	–
5	Adrian Schulze Solano	Germany	DF	26	2021	FSV Frankfurt (GER)
6	Connor Thompson	United States	MF	–	2021	–
5	Andrew Millar	United States	MF	–	2022	–
9	Niels Hartman	Gibraltar	MF	25	2023	Loughborough University (UK)
10	Maximilian Kissel	Germany	FW	23	2024	University of Bridgeport (USA)
11	Nick Lockermann	Germany	DF	23	2023	–
12	Yaniv Bazini	Israel	FW	26	2022	NC State University (USA)
13	Nash Barlow	United States	MF	–	2023	–
14	David Ismail	Germany	FW	23	2024	SpVgg Bayreuth (GER)
15	Ethan Czaporowski	Germany	FW	–	2024	Virginia Tech University (USA)
16	Gianluca Armellino	United States	FW	21	2023	Manhattan SC (USA)
17	Ioannis Vassiliou	Germany	DF	24	2024	FC Eddersheim (GER)
18	Marcell Papp	Hungary	FW	25	2024	Diósgyőri VTK (HUN)
19	Toby Grant	United States	DF	–	2024	–
21	Karl Daly	United States	DF	–	2022	–
22	Sydney Wathuta	Canada	FW	21	2023	Vermont Green FC (USA)
24	TJ Liquori	United States	MF	–	2023	–
25	Pieter Bultman	United States	DF	–	2023	–
27	Ryan Zellefrow	United States	FW	19	2024	–
28	Zach Barrett	United States	DF	24	2020	FC Motown (USA)
31	Jeremy Tsang	Hong Kong	DF	20	2023	Black Rock FC (USA)
36	Max Murray	United States	FW	24	2020	FC Motown (USA)
99	Mitchell Ringman	United States	GK	–	2024	–

== Coaching staff ==
Technical staff
Position	Name	Nationality
Head coach	Rob Dow	Canada
Assistant coach	Rory Twomey	United States
Associate head coach	Brad Cole	United States
Director of Operations	Mack Walton	United States
Athletic Director	Jeff Schulman	United States

== Schedule ==
Source: UVM

Date Time, TV	Rank^{#}	Opponent^{#}	Result	Record	Site (Attendance) City, State
Regular season
August 22*; 5:30 p.m., ESPN+	No. 14	at No. 12 West Michigan	L 1–3	0–1–0	WMU Soccer Complex (410); Kalamazoo, Michigan
August 29*; 7:00 p.m., ESPN+		at UC Irvine	T 1–1	0–1–1	Anteater Stadium (361); Irvine, California
September 2*; 7:00 p.m.		at San Diego	W 1–0	1–1–1	SDSU Sports Deck (313); San Diego, California
September 7*; 1:00 p.m., ESPN+		American	T 1–1	1–1–2	Virtue Field (795); Burlington, Vermont
September 10*; 6:00 p.m., ESPN+		at Lehigh	W 3–2	2–1–2	Ulrich Sports Complex (230); Bethlehem, Pennsylvania
September 14*; 6:00 p.m., ESPN+		Fairfield	W 5–0	3–1–2	Virtue Field (726); Burlington, Vermont
September 21*; 6:00 p.m., ESPN+		Harvard	W 5–0	4–1–2	Virtue Field (1,310); Burlington, Vermont
September 28; 1:00 p.m., ESPN+		New Hampshire	T 1–1	4–1–3	Virtue Field (1,989); Burlington, Vermont
October 1; 6:00 p.m., ESPN+		UMass	T 2–2	4–1–4	Virtue Field (611); Burlington, Vermont
October 5; 6:00 p.m., ESPN+		at UAlbany	W 4–1	5–1–4	Bob Ford Field (1,143); Albany, New York
October 8; 6:00 p.m., ESPN+		UConn	W 1–0	6–1–4	Virtue Field (667); Burlington, Vermont
October 13; 2:00 p.m., ESPN+		NJIT	W 2–0	7–1–4	Virtue Field (573); Burlington, Vermont
October 19; 4:30 p.m.	No. 20	Bryant Bulldogs	W 1–0	8–1–4	Virtue Field (1,129); Burlington, Vermont
October 26; 7:00 p.m., ESPN+	No. 16	at UMBC	L 0–1	8–2–4	Retriever Soccer Park (1,129); Baltimore, Maryland
November 1; 3:00 p.m.	No. 23	at UMass Lowell	W 2–1	9–2–4	Cushing Field Complex (186); Lowell, Massachusetts
November 5; 6:00 p.m., ESPN+	No. 17	Binghamton	T 1–1	9–2–5	Virtue Field (941); Burlington, Vermont
AEC Tournament
November 13; 6:00 p.m., ESPN+	(2) No. 17	vs. (3) UMBC; Semifinals	W 2–1 ^{2OT}	10–2–5	Virtue Field (1,328); Burlington, Vermont
November 17; 1:00 p.m., ESPN+	(2) No. 17	vs. (4) Bryant; Final	W 2–1	11–2–5	Virtue Field (2,400); Burlington, Vermont
NCAA Tournament
November 21*; 6:00 p.m., ESPN+	No. 17	Iona; First Round	W 5–0	12–2–5	Virtue Field (2,035); Burlington, Vermont
November 24*; 5:00 p.m., ESPN+	No. 17	at (7) No. 18 Hofstra; Second Round	W 2–1	13–2–5	Hofstra University Soccer Stadium (1,101); Hempstead, New York
December 1*; 8:00 p.m., ESPN+	No. 17	at No. 3 San Diego; Third Round	W 1–0 ^{OT}	14–2–5	Torero Stadium (3,227); San Diego, California
December 7*; 3:00 p.m., ESPN+	No. 17	at (2) No. 9 Pittsburgh; Quarterfinals	W 2–0	15–2–5	Petersen Sports Complex (1,416); Pittsburgh, Pennsylvania
December 13*; 5:00 p.m., ESPN+	No. 17	vs. (3) No. 4 Denver; Semifinals	T 1–1 (4–3 pens.)	15–2–6	WakeMed Soccer Park (not reported (Note: As of January 18, 2025, NCAA has yet to release the attendance of this match.)); Cary, NC
December 16*; 8:00 p.m., ESPN2/ESPN+	No. 17	vs. (13) No. 8 Marshall; Final	W 2–1 ^{2OT}	16–2–6	WakeMed Soccer Park (6,057); Cary, North Carolina
*Non-conference game. ^{#}Rankings from United Soccer Coaches. (#) Tournament seedings in parentheses. All times are in Eastern.

== Player statistics ==
=== Goals ===
2024 UVM Soccer Goals
Rank	No.	Nat.	Po.	Name	Regular season	AAC Tournament	NCAA Tournament	Total
1	12	(Israel)	FW	Yaniv Bazini	6	2	6	14
2	10	(Germany)	FW	Maximillian Kissel	7	1	3	11
3	18	(Hungary)	FW	Marcell Papp	3	1	1	5
4	36	(United States)	FW	Max Murray	4	0	0	4
5	14	(Germany)	FW	David Ismail	1	0	2	3
6	27	(United States)	FW	Ryan Zellefrow	1	0	1	2
6	7	(United States)	MF	Andrew Millar	2	0	0	2
8	22	(Canada)	DF	Sydney Wathuta	1	0	0	1
8	28	(United States)	DF	Zach Barrett	1	0	0	1
8	3	(United States)	DF	Mike Bleeker	1	0	0	1
8	6	(United States)	MF	Connor Thompson	1	0	0	1
8	13	(United States)	MF	Nash Barlow	1	0	0	1
8	25	(United States)	DF	Pieter Bultman	1	0	0	1
8	9	(Gibraltar)	MF	Niels Hartman	1	0	0	1
Opponent own goal					0	0	0	0
Total					0	0	0	48

=== Disciplinary record ===
2024 UVM Soccer Disciplinary record
Rank	No.	Nat.	Po.	Name	Regular Season			AAC Tournament			NCAA Tournament			Total		
Rank	No.	Nat.	Po.	Name	Booked	(yellow card) (yellow-red card)	Sent off (straight red)	Booked	(yellow card) (yellow-red card)	Sent off (straight red)	Booked	(yellow card) (yellow-red card)	Sent off (straight red)	Booked	(yellow card) (yellow-red card)	Sent off (straight red)
1	5	(Germany)	DF	Adrian Schulze Solano	1	0	0	2	0	0	1	0	0	4	0	0
2	25	(United States)	DF	Pieter Bultman	3	0	0	0	0	0	0	0	0	3	0	0
2	22	(Canada)	FW	Sydney Wathuta	2	0	0	0	0	0	1	0	0	3	0	0
2	27	(United States)	FW	Ryan Zellefrow	2	0	0	0	0	0	1	0	0	3	0	0
5	3	(United States)	DF	Mike Bleeker	2	0	0	0	0	0	0	0	0	2	0	0
5	9	(Gibraltar)	MF	Niels Hartman	2	0	0	0	0	0	0	0	0	2	0	0
5	28	(United States)	DF	Zach Barrett	2	0	0	0	0	0	0	0	0	2	0	0
5	13	(United States)	MF	Nash Barlow	2	0	0	0	0	0	0	0	0	2	0	0
5	11	(Germany)	DF	Nick Lockermann	1	0	0	0	0	0	1	0	0	2	0	0
5	14	(Germany)	FW	David Ismail	0	0	0	1	0	0	1	0	0	2	0	0
5	7	(United States)	MF	Andrew Millar	1	0	0	1	0	0	0	0	0	2	0	0
12	31	(Hong Kong)	DF	Jeremy Tsang	1	0	0	0	0	0	0	0	0	1	0	0
12	0	(United States)	GK	Lou Liedtka	1	0	0	0	0	0	0	0	0	1	0	0
12	21	(United States)	DF	Karl Daly	1	0	0	0	0	0	0	0	0	1	0	0
12	10	(Germany)	FW	Maximillian Kissel	1	0	0	0	0	0	0	0	0	1	0	0
12	6	(United States)	MF	Connor Thompson	1	0	0	0	0	0	0	0	0	1	0	0
12	18	(Hungary)	FW	Marcell Papp	1	0	0	0	0	0	0	0	0	1	0	0
12	17	(Germany)	DF	Ioannis Vassiliou	1	0	0	0	0	0	0	0	0	1	0	0
12	36	(United States)	FW	Max Murray	0	0	0	1	0	0	0	0	0	1	0	0
Team					0	0	0	0	0	0	0	0	0	0	0	0
Total					25	0	0	5	0	0	5	0	0	35	0	0

== Awards and honors ==
America East Conference
Recipient	Award	Date	Ref.
Sydney Wathuta	Midfielder of the Year	November 12, 2024	
Zach Barrett	Defender of the Year	November 12, 2024	
Sydney Wathuta	All-AAC First Team	November 8, 2024	
Yaniv Bazini	All-AAC First Team	November 8, 2024	
Zach Barrett	All-AAC First Team	November 8, 2024	
Maximilian Kissel	All-AAC Second Team	November 8, 2024	
Max Murray	All-AAC Second Team	November 8, 2024	
Kiklas Herceg	All-AAC Second Team	November 8, 2024	
Niklas Herceg	All-AAC Rookie Team	November 8, 2024	
Ryan Zellefrow	All-AAC Rookie Team	November 8, 2024	
Yaniv Bazini	All-AAC Academic Team	November 8, 2024	

NCAA Tournament
Recipient	Award	Date	Ref.
Maximilian Kissel	All-Tournament Team	December 16, 2024	
Kiklas Herceg	All-Tournament Team	December 16, 2024	
Yaniv Bazini	All-Tournament Team	December 16, 2024	
Zach Barrett	All-Tournament Team	December 16, 2024	
Marcell Papp	All-Tournament Team	December 16, 2024	
Maximilian Kissel	Tournament OMVP	December 16, 2024	
Niklas Herceg	Tournament DMVP	December 16, 2024	

== 2025 MLS SuperDraft ==
Player	Team	Round	Pick #	Position
Sydney Wathuta	Colorado Rapids	1	16	FW
Max Murray	New York City FC	1	17	DF

Source: Burlington Free Press

== Rankings ==
Ranking movements Legend: ██ Increase in ranking ██ Decrease in ranking — = Not ranked RV = Received votes ( ) = First-place votes
	Week																
Poll	Pre	1	2	3	4	5	6	7	8	9	10	11	12	13	14	15	Final
United Soccer	14	RV	—	—	—	—	—	—	20	16	23	17	Not released				1 (4)

== See also ==
- Vermont Catamounts men's soccer
