= 2024 NCAA Division I men's soccer championship game =

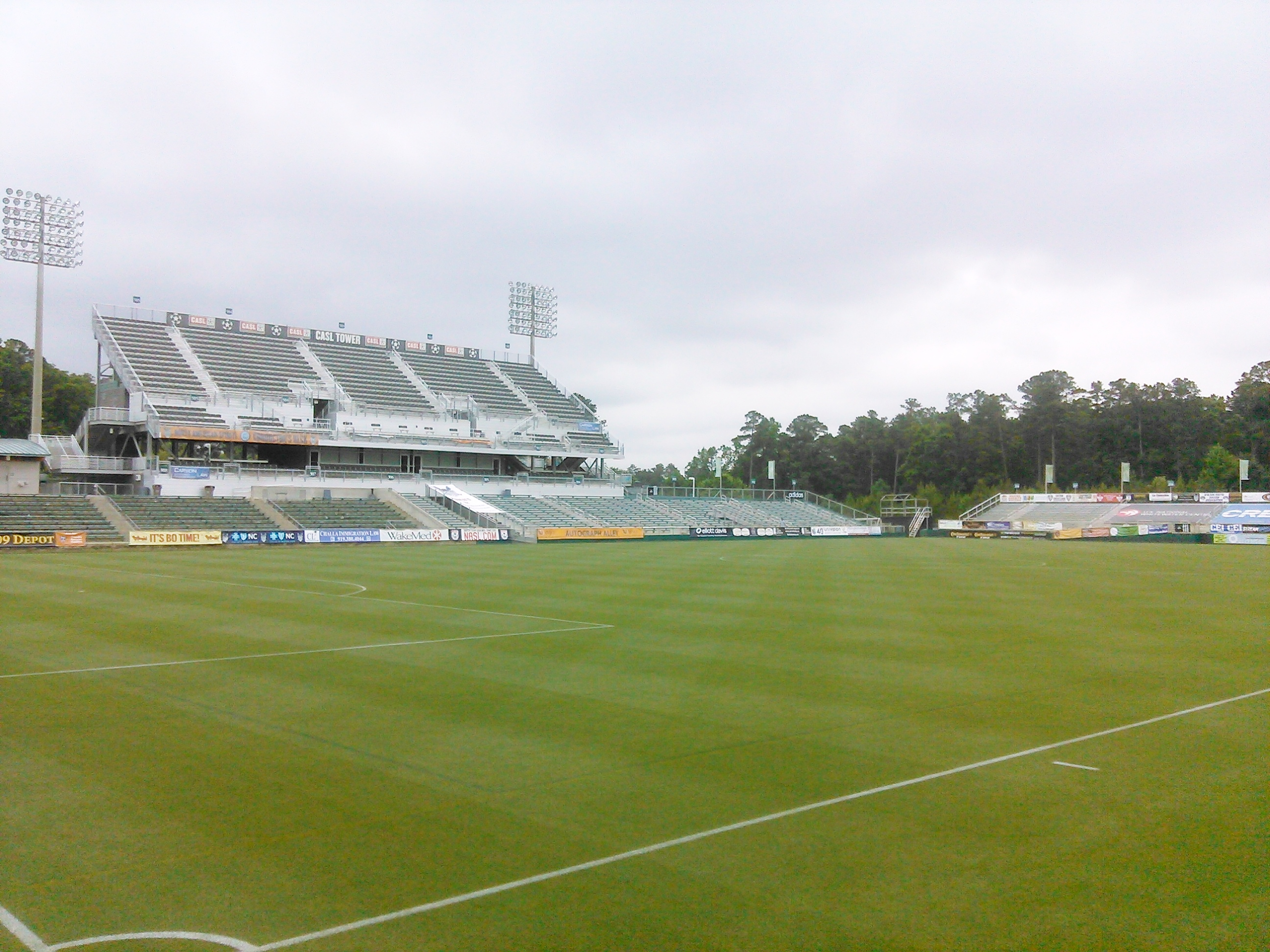
- WakeMed Soccer Park hosted the final
- Event: 2024 NCAA Division I men's soccer tournament
Vermont	Marshall
America East	Sun Belt
2	1
- Date: December 16, 2024
- Venue: WakeMed Soccer Park, Cary, North Carolina, U.S.
- (Off.) Man of the Match: Maximilian Kissel (Vermont)
- (Def.) Man of the Match: Niklas Herceg (Vermont)
- Referee: Michael Lavergne
- Attendance: 6,057
- Weather: Cloudy, 47 °F (8 °C)

The 2024 NCAA Division I men's soccer championship game (also known as the 2024 NCAA Division I Men's College Cup) was played on December 16, 2024, at WakeMed Soccer Park in Cary, North Carolina. The match determined the winner of the 2024 NCAA Division I men's soccer tournament, the national collegiate soccer championship in the United States. This was the 66th edition of the oldest active competition in United States college soccer.

The match featured the University of Vermont in their first finals appearance against Marshall University who were looking to win their second title after winning the 2020 championship. Vermont defeated Marshall 2–1 in overtime to win the first NCAA team championship in school history.

== Road to the final ==
The NCAA Division I men's soccer tournament, sometimes known as the College Cup, is an American intercollegiate soccer tournament conducted by the National Collegiate Athletic Association (NCAA), and determines the Division I men's national champion. The tournament has been formally held since 1959, when it was an eight-team tournament. Since then, the tournament has expanded to 48 teams, where every Division I conference tournament champion is allocated a berth.

Vermont (Am. East)		Round	Marshall (SBC)	
Opponent	Result	NCAA Tournament	Opponent	Result
Iona (MAAC)	5–0 (H)	First round	Bye	—N/a
Hofstra (CAA)	2–1 (A)	Second round	Furman (SoCon)	4–0 (H)
San Diego (WCC)	1–0 (A)	Third round (Sweet 16)	NC State (ACC)	2–1 (H)
Pittsburgh (ACC)	2–0 (A)	Quarterfinals (Elite 8)	SMU (ACC)	3–2 (A)
Denver (Summit)	1–1 (4–3 p) (N)	College Cup (Final 4)	Ohio State (Big Ten)	1–0 (N)

=== Vermont ===
The Vermont men's soccer team had a good 2024 season, finishing with a overall record of 16-2-6 and a conference mark of 4-1-2, highlighted by an unbeaten home campaign (8-0-4). The season began with a challenging 3-1 loss at Western Michigan, but the team quickly rebounded with key road victories over San Diego State (1-0) and Lehigh (3-2). At Virtue Field, Vermont demonstrated their strength with dominant 5-0 wins against Fairfield and Harvard, as well as hard-fought draws against New Hampshire (1-1) and UMass (2-2). A 4-1 win at UAlbany and a narrow 1-0 victory over UConn further showcased their resilience, while a late-season 1-0 loss at UMBC served as one of the few setbacks in an otherwise consistent campaign.

In the postseason, Vermont raised their level of play significantly. They secured the America East title with consecutive 2-1 wins over #3 UMBC and Bryant. In the NCAA Tournament, Vermont displayed a combination of offensive firepower and defensive tenacity, routing Iona 5-0 and earning gritty road wins over Hofstra (2-1) and San Diego (1-0). A standout performance came in the quarterfinals, where the team delivered a convincing 2-0 victory over Pittsburgh to reach the College Cup for the first time in program history. In the semifinals, Vermont battled Denver to a 1-1 draw before advancing to the championship game by winning on penalties, where they capped their remarkable season.

Offensively, Vermont’s success was driven by standout contributions from key players. Yaniv Bazini led the team with 14 goals, 2 assists, and 30 points across 24 matches, with 79 total shots and 3 game-winning goals highlighting his importance. Maximilian Kissel was another critical piece of the attack, scoring 11 goals on just 27 shots for an efficient 40.7% shooting percentage while adding 2 assists and a team-high 6 game-winning goals. Sydney Wathuta was a creative force, leading the team with 14 assists and contributing 16 total points. Max Murray (4 goals, 4 assists) and Marcell Papp (5 goals, 1 assist) added depth to the offense, while David Ismail and Zach Barrett combined for 4 goals and 10 assists to round out the team’s balanced attack. This collective effort was instrumental in propelling Vermont to one of the most successful seasons in its history.

=== Marshall ===
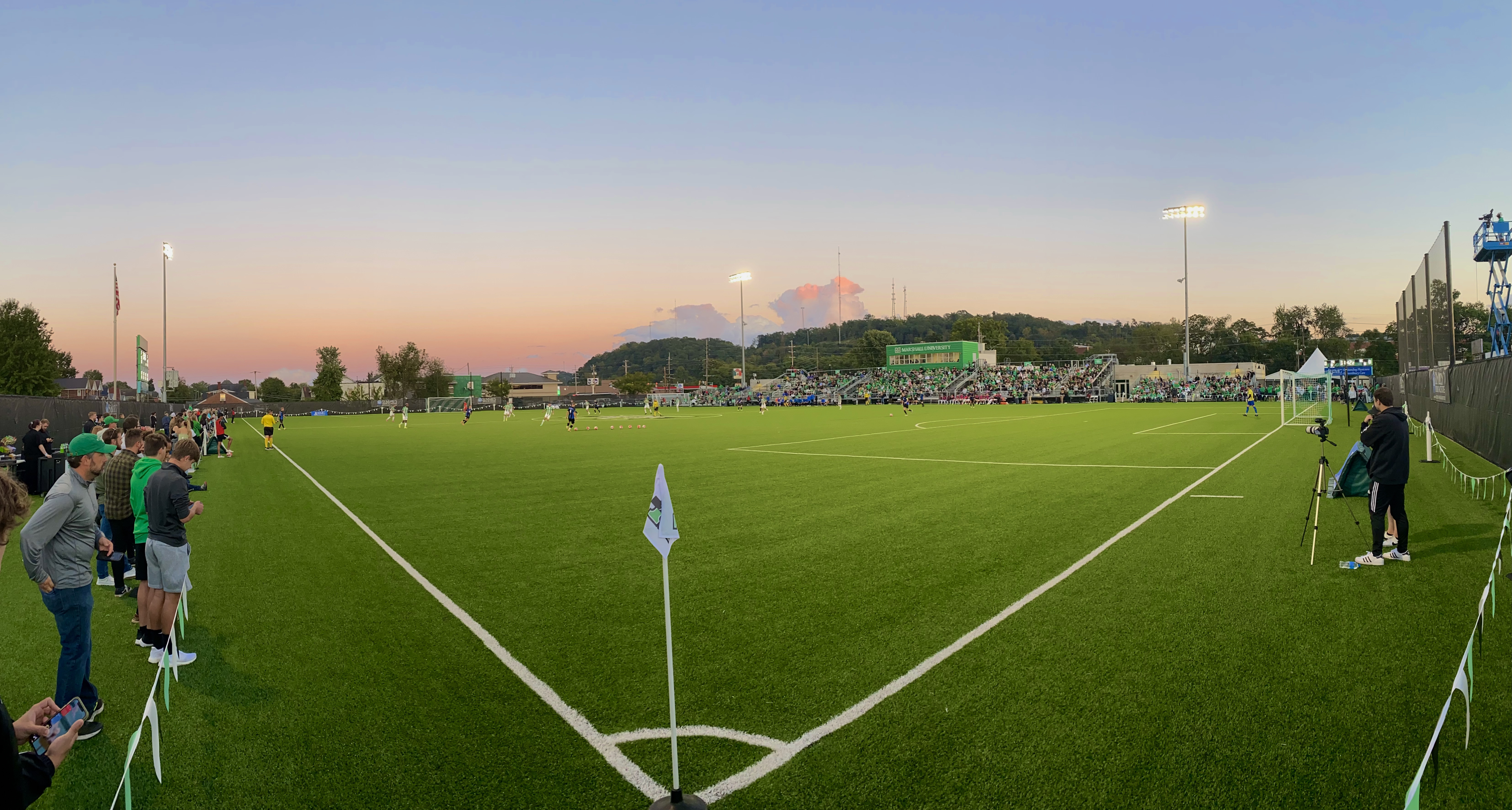
Marshall played their home matches at the Veterans Memorial Soccer Complex (pictured above).

Marshall University's men's soccer team delivered a strong 2024 season, finishing with a 15-2-7 overall record and going unbeaten in Sun Belt Conference play with a 4-0-5 mark. The team was particularly dominant at home, finishing with an 11-0-3 record in Huntington, W.Va. Their season began with a 3-0 win over Cal State Fullerton and included notable victories over Loyola (Md.) (6-1), High Point (2-0), and South Carolina (2-1). Marshall also secured valuable results against ranked opponents, such as a 1-0 victory over #22 VCU and a 2-2 draw with #10 James Madison.

Throughout the conference schedule, the team consistently earned results, including key draws with Coastal Carolina (0-0) and Kentucky (1-1). In the Sun Belt Conference Tournament, Marshall advanced with wins over Old Dominion (3-2) and James Madison (1-0) before a 0-0 draw against #10 WVU in the final, where they fell short in penalties.

In the NCAA Tournament, Marshall showcased both depth and resolve. A 4-0 win over Furman and a 2-1 victory against NC State set the stage for a tightly contested 3-2 win on the road at #12 SMU. The team advanced to the College Cup, where they earned a 1-0 win over top-seeded Ohio State in the national semifinals at WakeMed Soccer Park, concluding their season with a deep postseason run.

Marshall's offense in 2024 was spearheaded by Lineker Rodrigues dos Santos, who played in 24 matches, starting 23, and led the team with 15 goals and 5 assists for 35 points. His efficiency in front of goal was evident with a 25.9% shooting accuracy, and he contributed 6 game-winning goals, underscoring his importance in critical moments. Marco Silva emerged as a reliable secondary scorer, netting 5 goals on just 18 shots for an impressive 27.8% shooting percentage and maintaining a team-high 72.2% shots-on-goal rate.

The team's playmaking duties were spread across several contributors, with Tarik Pannholzer leading in assists (5) alongside his 3 goals, while Alexander Stjernegaard and Loic Sany Kong added 4 and 3 assists, respectively. Rai Pinto and Pablo Simon each scored 4 goals, demonstrating a balanced offensive approach, with Pinto notably converting all three of his penalty kick opportunities. Contributions also came from depth players like Aymane Sordo, who added 3 goals, and Joao Roberto, who scored twice off the bench.

This collective offensive effort, highlighted by Rodrigues dos Santos' prolific scoring and a well-rounded supporting cast, was key to Marshall’s success throughout their season and deep postseason run.

== Match ==
=== First half ===
The first half of the 2024 College Cup final between Marshall and Vermont was a tightly contested, defensive battle, with both teams creating chances but unable to break the deadlock. Vermont goalkeeper Niklas Herceg and Marshall goalkeeper Aleksa Janjic were tested early, with Vermont's Zach Barrett forcing Janjic into a save in the 4th minute and Marshall’s Takahiro Fujita registering the first shot for the Thundering Herd shortly after.

Both sides exchanged periods of possession and offensive opportunities. Marshall’s Tarik Pannholzer and Alex Bamford had shots on target, while Vermont’s David Ismail forced Janjic into another save in the 23rd minute. Vermont’s Yaniv Bazini had two attempts during the half, one missing left in the 29th minute and another shortly after that was handled by the Marshall defense.

Marshall maintained pressure late in the half, earning corner kicks in the 28th and 44th minutes, but Vermont’s defense held firm. Meanwhile, fouls disrupted the rhythm of play, with Marshall committing several infractions, including multiple by Theo Godard and Alex Bamford. Vermont also conceded fouls, including one by Ismail in the 33rd minute.

Neither team managed to convert their chances, and the first half concluded 0-0, with both defenses and goalkeepers playing key roles in keeping the match scoreless heading into the break.

=== Second half ===
In the second half of the 2024 College Cup final between Marshall and Vermont, both teams saw opportunities to take control of the match. The half began with Vermont earning an early corner kick, followed by a shot from Yaniv Bazini that missed left in the 47th minute. Marshall responded with offensive pressure, including a shot on target by Alexander Stjernegaard in the 52nd minute that was saved by Vermont goalkeeper Niklas Herceg. Vermont’s Mike Bleeker forced Marshall goalkeeper Aleksa Janjic into a save in the 50th minute, while Marshall’s Tarik Pannholzer and Haruhi Taneda tested Herceg with further shots in the 56th and 77th minutes, respectively.

Marshall broke the deadlock in the 67th minute when Tarik Pannholzer capitalized on a pass from Rai Pinto to give the Thundering Herd a 1-0 lead. Vermont quickly regrouped and found the equalizer in the 81st minute through Marcell Papp, who scored with an assist from Max Murray and David Ismail to level the score at 1-1.

The remainder of the half saw both sides pushing for a winner. Vermont’s Maximilian Kissel and Max Murray forced saves from Janjic, while Marshall’s Joao Roberto and Rai Pinto had chances that went off target. Fouls on both sides interrupted the flow of play late in regulation, and the second half ended 1-1, sending the match into overtime.

=== Extra time ===
In the golden-goal overtime period Vermont secured the national title with a dramatic finish. Marshall's Joao Roberto had two crucial opportunities early in overtime, including a shot in the 94th minute that was saved by Vermont goalkeeper Niklas Herceg. Moments later, in the 95th minute, Vermont's Maximilian Kissel received a long pass and broke away from Marshall defender Alex Bamford. On the breakaway, Kissel fired a shot past Marshall goalkeeper Aleksa Janjic, scoring the game-winning goal and sealing Vermont's 2-1 victory.

=== Match details ===
2024 College Cup
December 16, 2024
Final

Vermont	2–1 (a.e.t.)	Marshall
Papp 81'; Kissel 95'	Report	Pannholzer 67'

WakeMed Soccer Park, Cary, North Carolina
Attendance: 6,057
Referee: Michael Lavergne

Vermont
Marshall

GK	1	(Germany) Niklas Herceg
DF	2	(Canada) Nathan Simeon
DF	3	(United States) Mike Bleeker
DF	28	(United States) Zach Barrett
MF	5	(Germany) Adrian Schulze
MF	8	(Gibraltar) Niels Hartman
MF	11	(Israel) Yaniv Bazini
MF	22	(Canada) Sydney Wathuta
FW	27	(United States) Ryan Zellefrow
FW	36	(United States) Max Murray	(substituted off) 41'
FW	13	(Germany) David Ismail
Substitutions:
MF	7	(United States) Andrew Millar	(substituted on) 32' (substituted on) 65' (substituted off) 82'
FW	9	(Germany) Maximilian Kissel	(substituted on) 41'
DF	17	(Germany) Ioannis Vassiliou	(substituted on) 66'
FW	18	(Hungary) Marcel Papp	(substituted on) 66'
Head Coach:
(United States) Rob Dow

GK	31	(United States) Bryan Dowd
DF	2	(United States) Mitchell Ferguson	(substituted off) 45' (substituted on) 68'
DF	5	(United States) Kyle Genenbacher
DF	15	(Northern Ireland) Paddy Burns
DF	18	(United States) Josh Ramsey
MF	7	(United States) Ethan O'Brien	(substituted off) 38' (substituted on) 45' (substituted off) 50' (substituted on) 68'
MF	13	(United States) Bryce Boneau	(substituted on) 64'
MF	16	(Ghana) KK Baffour	(substituted on) 50'
FW	21	(United States) Matthew Roou	(substituted on) 72'
FW	9	(England) Eno Nto	(substituted off) 26' (substituted on) 59' (substituted off) 79'
FW	11	(United States) Daniel Russo	(substituted off) 59' (substituted on) 64'
Substitutions:
MF	22	(United States) Nolan Spicer	(substituted on) 26'
MF	6	(United States) Wyatt Lewis	(substituted on) 38' (substituted off) 72' (substituted on) 79'
Head Coach:
(England) Chris Grassie

College Cup MVP
Offensive: Maximilian Kissel (Vermont)
Defensive: Niklas Herceg (Vermont)

Assistant referees:
Baboucarr Jallow (United States)
Carlos Morales-Lastra (United States)
Fourth official:
Jude Carr (United States)

Match rules:

- 90 minutes.
- 20 minutes of extra time if necessary.
- Penalty shoot-out if scores still level.
- Unlimited substitutes, may not return if subbed out in the first half; may return unlimited times in the second half.

=== Statistics ===
Overall
	Vermont	Marshall
Goals scored	2	1
Total shots	13	16
Shots on target	7	5
Saves	4	5
Corner kicks	5	2
Offsides		
Yellow cards	0	3
Red cards	0	0

== Post-match ==
By winning the national title, the University of Vermont won their first national championship in a team sport. Including individual national championships, this was their second national title, joining their skiing team. Additionally, the match was notable for being the first NCAA men's soccer final since 2020 and the first College Cup since 2018 not to feature a team from the Atlantic Coast Conference. Vermont's victory also marked the first time a mid-major program claimed the NCAA men's soccer title since Marshall, who also competed in the final, won it in 2020. It was the first all-mid-major NCAA soccer championship game since 1977.

Several prominent local officials including governor Phil Scott, and senators Bernie Sanders and Peter Welch offered congratulations to the Vermont program for winning the national championship.
