= America East men's soccer tournament =

- Sport: College soccer
- Conference: America East Conference
- Number of teams: 6
- Format: Single-elimination tournament
- Played: 1988–present
- Last contest: 2026
- Current champion: Bryant (2nd title)
- Most championships: Vermont (8 titles)
- TV partner: ESPN+
- Official website: americaeast.com/msoccer

The America East men's soccer tournament (formerly known as the North Atlantic Conference championship (Note: The tournament was specifically called the "North Atlantic Conference championship" from 1989 until 1996.)) is the conference championship tournament in soccer for the America East Conference. The tournament has been held every year since 1988. It is a single-elimination tournament and seeding is based on regular season records. The winner, declared conference champion, receives the conference's automatic bid to the NCAA Division I men's soccer championship.

On December 16th 2024, the University of Vermont Catamounts team defeated the Marshall University Thundering Herd in the NCAA tournament championship game to claim the 2024 College Cup. This marked the first national championship by any America East Conference team in league history. Vermont also stands as the most winning conference team with eight tournaments won.

== Winners ==
The following is a list of A-East tournament winners:

=== Finals ===
Key

- (1) – Title number
- a.e.t. – Match went to extra time
- p – Match decided by a penalty shootout after extra time
- – Winning team won regular season
- – Winning team won National championship

Ed.	Year	Champion	Score	Runner-up	Venue	City	MVP	Ref.
1	1989	Vermont (1)	1–0	Hartford	Virtue Field	Burlington, VT	(United States) Kevin Wylie (Vermont)	
2	1990	Vermont (2)	1–1 (6–5 p)	Boston U	Nickerson Field	Boston, MA	(United States) Roberto Beall (Vermont)	
3	1991	Hartford (1)	2–0	Boston U	Nickerson Field	Boston, MA	(Canada) Elvis Thomas (Hartford)	
4	1992	Hartford (2)	2–0	Vermont	Nickerson Field	Boston, MA	(United States) George Kostelis (Hartford)	
5	1993	Boston U (1)	1–0	UNH	Ohiri Field	Cambridge, MA	(United States) Tom Giatrakos (Boston U)	
6	1994	Boston U (2)	3–1	UNH	Nickerson Field	Boston, MA	(Norway) Gisle Sorli (Boston U)	
7	1995	Boston U (3)	3–1	Towson	Vidas Field	Philadelphia, PA	(Norway) Ola Olsen (Boston U)	
8	1996	Boston U (4)	2–1	Northeastern	Hormel Stadium	Medford, MA	(United States) Nick Bone (Boston U)	
9	1997	Boston U (5)	2–1	Hofstra	Shuart Stadium	Hempstead, NY	(United States) Nick Bone (Boston U)	
10	1998	Drexel (1)	2–1	Towson	Towson Field	Towson, MD	(United States) Pete Shay (Drexel)	
11	1999	Hartford (3)	2–0	Towson	Alumni Stadium	West Hartford, CT	(Malta) Cristoffer Hartmann (Hartford)	
12	2000	Vermont (3)	2–1	Hofstra	Virtue Field	Burlington, VT	(United States) Mike Dias (Vermont)	
13	2001	Towson (1)	1–0	Northeastern	Towson Field	Towson, MD	(United States) Chris Hurley (Towson)	
14	2002	Northeastern (1)	2–1	Vermont	Parsons Field	Brookline, MA	(Greece) Atha Kirkopolous (Northeastern)	
15	2003	Binghamton (1)	(3–2 p)	Northeastern	Bearcats Complex	Binghamton, NY	(Scotland) Stefan Gonet (Binghamton)	
16	2004	Boston U (6)	2–2 (5–3 p)	Binghamton	Nickerson Field	Boston, MA	(United States) Federico Bianchi (Boston U)	
17	2005	Stony Brook (1)	1–1 (4–2 p)	Binghamton	Kenneth LaValle	Stony Brook, NY	(Ecuador) Douglas Narvaez (Stony Brook)	
18	2006	Binghamton (2)	1–0 (a.e.t.)	Vermont	Bearcats Complex	Binghamton, NY	(Scotland) Barry Neville (Binghamton)	
19	2007	Vermont (4)	1–0	Binghamton	Bearcats Complex	Binghamton, NY	(United States) Roger Scully (Vermont)	
20	2008	Boston U (7)	1–0	Binghamton	Nickerson Field	Boston, MA	(China) Jin Oh (Boston U)	
21	2009	Stony Brook (2)	2–0	UMBC	Kenneth LaValle	Stony Brook, NY	(United States) Anthony Rogic (Stony Brook)	
22	2010	UMBC	0–0 (5–4 p)	UNH	Retriever Park	Baltimore, MD	(Ivory Coast) Levi Houapeu (UMBC)	
23	2011	Stony Brook (3)	4–2	Hartford	Kenneth LaValle	Stony Brook, NY	(Brazil) Leo Fernandes (Stony Brook)	
24	2012	UMBC (2)	0–0 (4–2 p)	UNH	Retriever Park	Baltimore, MD	(United States) Phil Saunders (UMBC)	
25	2013	UMBC (3)	4–0	Hartford	Retriever Park	Baltimore, MD	(United States) Pete Caringi III (UMBC)	
26	2014	UMBC (4)	2–1	Hartford	Retriever Park	Baltimore, MD	(United States) Greg Hauck (UMBC)	
27	2015	Vermont (5)	1–0	Binghamton	Virtue Field	Burlington, VT	(Canada) Brian Wright (Vermont)	
28	2016	Albany (1) (Note: Albany was the first overall seed in the tournament. However, the regular season was won by UMass Lowell. UMass Lowell was ineligible for postseason play due to transitioning from Division II to Division I.)	1–0	Hartford	Bob Ford Field	Albany, NY	(Brazil) Bernardo Mattos (Albany)	
29	2017	Albany (2)	1–0 (a.e.t.)	UMass Lowell	Cushing Field	Lowell, MA	(Belgium) Daniel Krutzen (Albany)	
30	2018	UNH (1)	5–0	UMBC	Wildcat Stadium	Durham, NH	(United States) Josh Bauer (UNH)	
31	2019	UNH (2)	1–0	Hartford	Wildcat Stadium	Durham, NH	(United States) Josh Bauer (UMH)	
32	2020	UNH (3)	2–0	Vermont	Wildcat Stadium	Durham, NH	(France) Victor Menudier (UNH)	
33	2021	Vermont (6)	1–0	UNH	Wildcat Stadium	Durham, NH	(Germany) Adrian Schulze (Vermont)	
34	2022	UNH (4)	2–0	Albany	Wildcat Stadium	Durham, NH	(United Arab Emirates) Jassem Koleilat (UNH)	
35	2023	Bryant (1)	1–0 (a.e.t.)	UNH	Wildcat Stadium	Durham, NH	(Cyprus) Antreas Hadjigavriel (Bryant)	
36	2024	Vermont (7)	2–1	Bryant	Virtue Field	Burlington, VT	(United States) Zach Barrett (Vermont)	
37	2025	Vermont (8)	2–0	Bryant	Virtue Field	Burlington, VT	(Germany) David Ismail (Vermont)	
38	2026	Bryant (2)	1–0	NJIT	Beirne Stadium	Smithfield, RI	(United States) Ramon Camejo (Bryant)	

== Championships by School ==
School	Titles	Winning years
Vermont	8	1989, 1990, 2000, 2007, 2015, 2021, 2024, 2025
Boston (Note: Former member of the America East.)	7	1993, 1994, 1995, 1996, 1997, 2004, 2008
Hartford	4	1989, 1991, 1992, 1999
UMBC	4	2010, 2012, 2013, 2014
UNH	4	2018, 2019, 2020, 2022
Stony Brook	3	2005, 2009, 2011
Albany	2	2016, 2017
Binghamton	2	2003, 2006
Bryant	2	2026
Drexel	1	1998
Northeastern	1	2002
Towson	1	2001
