= Niels Hartman =

Footballer (born 2001)

Personal information
- Full name: Niels Mark Pieter Hartman
- Date of birth: 17 January 2001 (age 25)
- Place of birth: Schoonhoven, Netherlands
- Height: 6 ft 2 in (1.88 m)
- Positions: Defensive midfielder; centre-back

Youth career
- 2010–2013: Unión Estepona
- 2013: San Roque
- 2013–2017: Taraguilla
- 2017–2020: Algeciras

College career
Years	Team	Apps	(Gls)
2023–2025	Vermont Catamounts	52	(3)

Senior career*
Years	Team	Apps	(Gls)
2020–2021	Loughborough University	2	(0)
2021-2022	Lynx	5	(0)
2021	→ VV HSC (loan)	5	(0)
2022–2023	Loughborough Students	20	(3)
2024	Ventura County Fusion	0	(0)
2026	Mons Calpe	3	(0)

International career^{‡}
2023–	Gibraltar	7	(0)
- * Club domestic league appearances and goals as of 4 March 2026 ‡ National team caps and goals as of 26 March 2024

Niels Mark Pieter Hartman (born 17 January 2001) is a footballer who plays as a defender or midfielder, most recently for Mons Calpe. Born in the Netherlands, he represents Gibraltar at international level.

== Club career ==
Having moved to Gibraltar as a child due to his parents relocating for work, Hartman spent his youth playing at a number of Spanish youth teams, most notably Unión Estepona and Algeciras. In 2020 he moved to the United Kingdom to study mechanical engineering at Loughborough University, where he also played for their football team, however, the COVID-19 pandemic caused him to pause his studies and return to Gibraltar. Upon his return, he completed the 2020–21 season at Lynx, before spending six months on an internship in the Netherlands, during which time he spent three months in the summer playing for local side VV HSC. In October 2021, he returned to Lynx for the start of the 2021–22 season.

Upon the resumption of his studies, he re-joined Loughborough Students in summer 2022. After three goals in 20 appearances during a league campaign which saw the Scholars finish third in the United Counties League Premier North, he moved to the United States to play college soccer for the University of Vermont's side Vermont Catamounts. He played 20 games in his first season, scoring once.

In May 2024 he moved across the States to California to join USL League Two side Ventura County Fusion on a short-term deal during the NCAA off-season, but did not make an appearance before returning to Vermont to complete his studies. In his second season with Vermont, he played another 20 games, scoring once as the Catamounts won the NCAA College Championship for the first time in their history. After one more season in Vermont, which saw another conference title despite being defeated in the College Championship, Hartman returned to Gibraltar in January 2026 to join Mons Calpe.

== International career ==
Born in the Netherlands and raised in Gibraltar, Hartman was eligible to represent Gibraltar or the Netherlands. Upon receiving his British Overseas Territory passport, he made his international debut for Gibraltar against his birth country on 27 March 2023, appearing as a late substitute in a 3–0 defeat at De Kuip, just 30 kilometres away from his place of birth.

== Career statistics ==
As of match played 14 March 2026

Appearances and goals by club, season and competition
Club	Season	League			National Cup		League Cup		Continental		Other		Total	
Club	Season	Division	Apps	Goals	Apps	Goals	Apps	Goals	Apps	Goals	Apps	Goals	Apps	Goals
Loughborough University	2020–21	United Counties League Premier Division North	2	0	0	0	0	0	—		0	0	2	0
Lynx	2020–21	Gibraltar National League	2	0	1	0	—		—		0	0	3	0
Lynx	2021–22	Gibraltar National League	3	0	0	0	—		—		0	0	3	0
Lynx	Total		5	0	1	0	—		—		0	0	6	0
VV HSC (loan)	2021–22	Derde Klasse	5	0	0	0	—		—		0	0	5	0
Loughborough Students	2022–23	United Counties League Premier Division North	20	3	0	0	0	0	—		0	0	20	3
Vermont Catamounts	2023	NCAA Division I	20	1	—		—		—		—		20	1
Vermont Catamounts	2024	NCAA Division I	20	1	—		—		—		—		20	1
Vermont Catamounts	2025	NCAA Division I	12	1	—		—		—		—		12	1
Vermont Catamounts	Total		52	3	—		—		—		—		52	3
Ventura County Fusion	2024	USL League Two	0	0	0	0	—		—		—		0	0
Mons Calpe	2025–26	Gibraltar Football League	3	0	3	0	—		—		0	0	6	0
Career total			87	6	4	0	0	0	0	0	0	0	91	6

=== International ===
As of 26 March 2024

Gibraltar
Year	Apps	Goals
2023	5	0
2024	2	0
Total	7	0

== Honours ==
Vermont Catamounts

- NCAA Division I Championship: 2024
- America East Championship: 2024, 2025
- America East regular season winner: 2024, 2025

== Personal life ==
His sister, Iris, plays for the Gibraltar national netball team.
