= Rob Dow =

Canadian soccer coach (born 1981)

Current position
- Title: Head coach
- Team: Penn State Nittany Lions
- Conference: Big Ten conference
- Record: 77–37–10

Biographical details
- Born: September 7, 1981 (age 45); Cole Harbour, Nova Scotia, Canada

Playing career
- 1999–2002: Maine

Coaching career (HC unless noted)
- 2003: Maine (assistant)
- 2004–2005: Mayville State (assistant)
- 2006–2007: Dean
- 2008–2011: Southern New Hampshire (assistant)
- 2012–2017: Vermont (assistant)
- 2017–2025: Vermont
- 2026–: Penn State Nittany Lions

Head coaching record
- Overall: 77–37–10

Rob Dow (born September 7, 1981) is a Canadian soccer coach and a former soccer player. He is currently the head coach of the Penn State Nittany Lions.

Dow has also coached for the University of Maine, Mayville State University, Dean College, Southern New Hampshire University, and Vermont, whom the latter he led to victory in the 2024 NCAA championships. He is a graduate the University of Maine, and earned his master's degree at North Dakota State University.

== Head coaching record ==
Record table
Season	Team	Overall	Conference	Standing	Postseason
Vermont Catamounts (America East Conference) (2017–present)
2017	Vermont	10–8–1	5–1–1	1st	
2018	Vermont	11–7–1	4–3	3rd	
2019	Vermont	11–6–1	5–1–1	T–1st	
2020	Vermont	5–2–1	4–1–1	2nd	
2021	Vermont	11–4–2	6–1–1	2nd	NCAA First Round
2022	Vermont	16–4–2	5–1–1	2nd	NCAA Quarterfinal
2023	Vermont	13–6–2	4–3–0	4th	NCAA Third Round
2024	Vermont	16–2–6	4–1–3	2nd	NCAA Champion
Vermont:		77–37–10	33–12–5		
Total:		77–37–10			
National champion Postseason invitational champion Conference regular season champion Conference regular season and conference tournament champion Division regular season champion Division regular season and conference tournament champion Conference tournament champion
