= 2023 NCAA Division I men's soccer tournament =

2023 edition of the NCAA Division I men's soccer tournament

- Classification: Division I
- Teams: 48
- Matches: 47
- Site: Lynn Family Stadium (Semifinal and Final); Louisville, Kentucky
- Champions: Clemson (4th title)
- Winning coach: Mike Noonan (2nd title)
- MVP: Ousmane Sylla (Offensive); Pape Mar Boye (Defensive) (Clemson)
- Broadcast: ESPN+, ESPNU

The 2023 NCAA Division I men's soccer tournament was the 65th edition of the NCAA Division I men's soccer tournament, a postseason tournament that determined the national champion of 2023 NCAA Division I men's soccer season. The College Cup was played on December 8 and December 11 at Lynn Family Stadium in Louisville, Kentucky and televised on ESPNU.

Syracuse is the defending national champion. Syracuse was unable to defend their title as they lost to New Hampshire in the Second Round. Clemson went on to defeat Notre Dame in the final by a score of 2–1. This was Clemson's second title in three years, and it was the third straight year that a team from the ACC won the title.

== Qualification ==
Of the 211 Division I men's soccer programs, 202 were eligible to qualify for the tournament. Nine programs were ineligible due to the reclassification process. Twenty-one teams received automatic bids by winning their conference tournaments, two teams received automatic bids by claiming the conference regular season crown (the Pac-12 Conference and West Coast Conference don't hold conference tournaments), and an additional 25 teams earned at-large bids based on their regular season records.

Automatic Bids
Conference	Team	Date qualified	Record	Appearance	Last Bid
ACC	Clemson	November 11	10–3–5	36th	2022
America East	Bryant	November 12	16–1–2	1st	None
American	Charlotte	November 12	12–3–1	17th	2021
ASUN	Lipscomb	November 11	10–3–4	5th	2022
Atlantic 10	Dayton	November 12	7–6–6	5th	2015
Big East	Xavier	November 12	8–3–6	5th	2014
Big South	High Point	November 11	10–3–5	4th	2022
Big Ten	Indiana	November 12	12–4–4	48th	2022
Big West	UC Irvine	November 11	9–6–4	7th	2018
CAA	Hofstra	November 11	13–3–4	8th	2022
Horizon	Green Bay	November 11	10–3–5	3rd	2009
Ivy	Yale	November 12	10–5–3	8th	2019
MAAC	Rider	November 12	12–3–4	6th	2018
Missouri Valley (Note: Men's soccer affiliate member)	Western Michigan	November 11	15–1–3	4th	2022
Northeast	LIU	November 12	10–5–3	17th	2021
Ohio Valley	SIU Edwardsville	November 11	16–0–3	16th	2016
Pac-12	UCLA	November 10	9–3–5	48th	2022
Patriot	Boston University	November 11	12–3–4	16th	2015
SoCon	Mercer	November 12	7–5–8	6th	2021
Summit	Omaha	November 11	8–7–4	3rd	2020
Sun Belt	Marshall	November 12	17–2–0	5th	2022
West Coast	San Diego	November 10	11–4–3	16th	2022
WAC	Cal Baptist	November 11	9–5–4	2nd	2022

At-Large Bids
Conference	Team	Record	Appearance	Last Bid
Summit	Denver	10–2–5	13th	2022
ACC	Duke	11–3–3	30th	2022
American	FIU	9–4–4	13th	2022
Big East	Georgetown	12–2–3	14th	2022
Sun Belt	James Madison	8–4–5	16th	2020
Sun Belt	Kentucky	7–7–4	14th	2022
ACC	Louisville	11–5–3	15th	2022
West Coast	Loyola Marymount	7–4–6	9th	2020
American	Memphis	10–5–2	4th	2022
Missouri Valley	Missouri State	11–3–3	8th	2022
America East	New Hampshire	12–2–4	8th	2022
ACC	North Carolina	10–3–6	30th	2022
ACC	Notre Dame	11–2–4	24th	2021
Pac-12	Oregon State	7–5–5	8th	2022
ACC	Pittsburgh	6–6–4	7th	2022
West Coast	Portland	12–4–0	19th	2022
WAC	Seattle	12–3–3	6th	2021
American	SMU	13–2–2	35th	2022
Pac-12	Stanford	9–3–5	21st	2022
ACC	Syracuse	8–4–7	9th	2022
Sun Belt	UCF	10–3–2	9th	2020
America East	Vermont	11–5–2	13th	2022
ACC	Virginia	10–3–4	43rd	2022
ACC	Wake Forest	11–2–5	27th	2022
Sun Belt	West Virginia	14–2–4	16th	2021

=== Seeded teams ===
The top 16 teams are seeded and earn a bye to the second round of the tournament.

Seeded teams
Seed	School	Conference	Record	Berth type	United Soccer Coaches ranking	RPI ranking
1	Marshall	Sun Belt	17–2–0	Automatic	1st	1st
2	Notre Dame	ACC	11–2–4	At-Large	4th	3rd
3	North Carolina	ACC	10–3–6	At-Large	7th	5th
4	Georgetown	Big East	12–2–3	At-Large	3rd	2nd
5	West Virginia	Sun Belt	14–2–4	At-Large	5th	6th
6	SMU	American	13–2–2	At-Large	2nd	4th
7	Virginia	ACC	10–3–4	At-Large	11th	9th
8	New Hampshire	America East	12–2–4	At-Large	10th	7th
9	Clemson	ACC	10–3–5	Automatic	14th	17th
10	Wake Forest	ACC	11–2–5	At-Large	6th	15th
11	Portland	West Coast	12–4–0	At-Large	13th	10th
12	UCF	Sun Belt	10–3–2	At-Large	12th	12th
13	UCLA	Pac-12	9–3–5	Automatic	21st	18th
14	Hofstra	CAA	13–3–4	Automatic	17th	8th
15	Duke	ACC	11–3–3	At-Large	8th	20th
16	Stanford	Pac-12	9–3–5	At-Large	22nd	19th

== Bracket ==
The bracket was announced on Monday, November 13, 2023. First round games will be played on November 16 at campus sites.

=== Region 1 ===
First Round; November 16
San Diego*	1 (2)
Cal Baptist (p)	1 (3)
Missouri State*	1
Omaha	0
Charlotte*	1
High Point	0
Syracuse*	3
Boston University	1

Second Round; November 19
1	Marshall*	3
Cal Baptist	0
16	Stanford*	3
Missouri State	1
9	Clemson*	3
Charlotte	0
8	New Hampshire*	3
Syracuse	0

Third Round; November 25–26
1	Marshall*	0
16	Stanford	3
9	Clemson	1
8	New Hampshire*	0

Quarterfinals; December 2
16	Stanford	0
9	Clemson*	2

Host Institution*

=== Region 2 ===
First Round; November 16
Louisville*	4
Dayton	3
Vermont*	3
Rider	1
Loyola Marymount*	4
UC Irvine	2
Pittsburgh*	2
James Madison	3

Second Round; November 19
5	West Virginia*	1
Louisville	0
12	UCF*	2
Vermont (a.e.t.)	3
13	UCLA*	0
Loyola Marymount	1
4	Georgetown*	0
James Madison	1

Third Round; November 25–26
5	West Virginia*	2
Vermont	1
Loyola Marymount	1
James Madison	0

Quarterfinals; December 2
5	West Virginia*	3
Loyola Marymount	1

Host Institution*

=== Region 3 ===
First Round; November 16
Memphis*	2
SIU Edwardsville	1
Bryant*	0
Yale	1
Oregon State* (a.e.t.)	2
Seattle	1
Denver*	2
LIU	1

Second Round; November 19
3	North Carolina*	2
Memphis	0
14	Hofstra*	2
Yale	0
11	Portland*	0
Oregon State	3
6	SMU*	2
Denver	1

Third Round; November 25–26
3	North Carolina* (p)	2 (5)
14	Hofstra	2 (3)
Oregon State	7
6	SMU*	1

Quarterfinals; December 2
3	North Carolina*	0
Oregon State	1

Host Institution*

=== Region 4 ===
First Round; November 16
FIU*	1
Mercer	0
Indiana*	2
Lipscomb	1
Western Michigan*	3
Green Bay	0
Xavier*	0
Kentucky	2

Second Round; November 19
7	Virginia* (a.e.t.)	2
FIU	1
10	Wake Forest*	2
Indiana (a.e.t.)	3
15	Duke*	1
Western Michigan	2
2	Notre Dame*	2
Kentucky	0

Third Round; November 25–26
7	Virginia*	0
Indiana	1
Western Michigan	0 (2)
2	Notre Dame* (p)	0 (4)

Quarterfinals; December 2
Indiana	1 (4)
2	Notre Dame*	1 (5)

Host Institution*

=== 2023 Men's College Cup ===
Semifinals; December 8 Lynn Family Stadium; Louisville, Kentucky
9	Clemson	1
5	West Virginia	0
Oregon State	0
2	Notre Dame	1

Championship; December 11 @ 6:00pm EST; Lynn Family Stadium; Louisville, Kentucky
9	Clemson	2
2	Notre Dame	1

== Results ==
=== First round ===
November 16	San Diego	1–1 (a.e.t.) (2–3 p)	Cal Baptist	San Diego, CA
10:00 PM EST	Bahena 16'	Report	21' Mueller	Stadium: Torero Stadium; Attendance: 1,412; Referee: Brandon Stevis; Assistant referees: Irving Navarro; Steven Cardozo; Fourth official: Adrian Gonzalez
	Penalties
	Walz (penalty missed); Johnstone (penalty missed); Duus Muller (penalty scored); Tunbridge (penalty scored); Pena (penalty missed)		(penalty scored) Gomez; (penalty scored) Vargas; (penalty missed) Mueller; (penalty scored) Hasenohrl

November 16	Missouri State	1–0	Omaha	Springfield, MO
7:30 PM EST	Petricca 19'	Report		Stadium: Betty and Bobby Allison South Stadium; Attendance: 1,022; Referee: Velimir Stefanovic; Assistant referees: Tim Wagner; Ryan Cook; Fourth official: Andrew Ellsworth

November 16	Charlotte	1–0	High Point	Charlotte, NC
7:00 PM EST	Jauk 37'	Report		Stadium: Transamerica Field; Attendance: 1,869; Referee: Mike Stutt; Assistant referees: Justin Howard; Joshua Belk; Fourth official: William Steffen

November 16	Syracuse	3–1	Boston University	Syracuse, NY
6:00 PM EST	Kaloukian 23', 34'; Belluz 33'	Report	3' Rosen	Stadium: SU Soccer Stadium; Attendance: 1,321; Referee: Dave Breckner; Assistant referees: Jason Weischedel; Stephen Montanino; Fourth official: Thomas Felice

November 16	Louisville	4–3	Dayton	Louisville, KY
7:00 PM EST	Jones 13'; Boccuzzo 18'; LeBel 35'; McManus 64'	Report	17' Brown; 19' Svendby; 20' Mboma Dem	Stadium: Dr. Mark & Cindy Lynn Stadium; Attendance: 877; Referee: Hilario Grajeda; Assistant referees: Chad Collins; Dean Morgan; Fourth official: Aaron Rawlins

November 16	Vermont	3–1	Rider	Burlington, VT
6:00 PM EST	Bazini 24', 87' (pen.); Lockermann 29'	Report	81' Diene	Stadium: Virtue Field; Attendance: 1,577; Referee: Daniel Shenk Moreno; Assistant referees: Andrew Porada; Nicola Vesia; Fourth official: Hao Zhong

November 16	Loyola Marymount	4–2	UC Irvine	Los Angeles, CA
10:00 PM EST	Kingsford 39'; Fidelak 59'; Smalls 89', 90'	Report	64' Anaya; 77' (pen.) Espinoza	Stadium: Sullivan Field; Attendance: 915; Referee: Ivan De Cristofaro; Assistant referees: Kristin Patterson; Rafael Bonilla; Fourth official: Steve Lane

November 16	Pittsburgh	2–3	James Madison	Pittsburgh, PA
7:00 PM EST	Sullivan 16'; Thorsen 22'	Report	12' Krakowiak; 18', 57' Robles	Stadium: Ambrose Urbanic Field; Attendance: 764; Referee: Austin Saini; Assistant referees: Joseph Knoff; Terrence Mull; Fourth official: Jeffery Mellen

November 16	Memphis	2–1	SIU Edwardsville	Memphis, TN
8:00 PM EST	Rodrigues dos Santos 9', 27'	Report	61' Dashin	Stadium: Billy J. Murphy Track & Soccer Complex; Attendance: 1,029; Referee: Dorian Del Toro; Assistant referees: Albert Kyei-Mensah; Sam Bilbo; Fourth official: Don Eubanks

November 16	Bryant	0–1	Yale	Smithfield, RI
6:00 PM EST		Report	89' Rogers	Stadium: Beirne Stadium; Attendance: 2,333; Referee: Kevin Morrison; Assistant referees: Jessica Carnevale; Samuel Conroy; Fourth official: Juan Montalvan

November 16	Oregon State	2–1 (a.e.t.)	Seattle	Corvallis, OR
9:00 PM EST	Williams 31'; Cortijo 92'	Report	61' Mohamed	Stadium: Paul Lorenz Field; Attendance: 722; Referee: Baboucarr Jallow; Assistant referees: Cody Zipp; Raymond Moffatte Jr. Fourth official: Cameron Zipp

November 16	Denver	2–1	LIU	Denver, CO
5:00 PM EST	Willoughby 80'; Schommer 83'	Report	67' Jaaskelainen	Stadium: University of Denver Soccer Stadium; Attendance: 426; Referee: Christian Campo Hernandez; Assistant referees: Jason Hampton; James Morgan; Fourth official: Adam Rice

November 16	FIU	1–0	Mercer	Miami, FL
7:00 PM EST	Afrifa 21'	Report		Stadium: FIU Soccer Stadium; Attendance: 687; Referee: Alejo Calume; Assistant referees: Abdel Kuttaineh; John Ocampo; Fourth official: Javier Santos

November 16	Indiana	2–1	Lipscomb	Bloomington, IN
6:00 PM EST	Oduro 32'; Goumballe 74'	Report	84' Spicer	Stadium: Bill Armstrong Stadium; Attendance: 2,013; Referee: Nicholas Balcer; Assistant referees: Andrew Bigelow; Race Williams; Fourth official: Saleem Abufares

November 16	Western Michigan	3–0	Green Bay	Kalamazoo, MI
1:00 PM EST	Sharp 11', 50', 71'	Report		Stadium: WMU Soccer Complex; Attendance: 770

November 16	Xavier	0–2	Kentucky	Cincinnati, OH
7:00 PM EST		Report 1 Report 2	26', 68' Damge	Stadium: Corcoran Field; Attendance: 720; Referee: Sorin Stoica; Assistant referees: Michael Nickerson; Kyle Maust; Fourth official: Ali Zolgharnain

=== Second round ===
November 19	(1) Marshall	3–0	Cal Baptist	Huntington, WV
1:00 p.m. EST	Bell 24'; Adjetey 75'; Simon 85'	Report		Stadium: Hoops Family Field; Attendance: 2,959; Referee: Stephen Foster; Assistant referees: Zachary McWhorter; Williams Gaither; Fourth official: Andrey Castel

November 19	(16) Stanford	3–1	Missouri State	Stanford, CA
8:00 p.m. EST	Bohane 17' de Flores 30'; Kiil 64'	Report	Barea 8'	Stadium: Laird Q. Cagan Stadium; Attendance: 1,103; Referee: Christopher Spivey; Assistant referees: Sergiu Iordachi; Oscar Guillen; Fourth official: Devlin Creighton

November 19	(9) Clemson	3–0	Charlotte	Clemson, SC
6:30 p.m. EST	Parrish 35'; Sylla 49'; Duquenne 88'	Report		Stadium: Historic Riggs Field; Attendance: 2,897; Referee: Matthew Thompson; Assistant referees: Kyle Johnston; Joshua Belk; Fourth official: Khadine Sahara

November 19	(8) New Hampshire	3–0	Syracuse	Durham, NH
2:00 p.m. EST	Healy 6'; Maxon 37'; Goldman 61'	Report		Stadium: Wildcat Stadium; Attendance: 2,750; Referee: Matthew Mercier; Assistant referees: Katarzyna Wasiak; George Frascione; Fourth official: Andrew Porada

November 19	(5) West Virginia	1–0	Louisville	Morgantown, WV
2:00 p.m. EST	Tsukada 72'	Report		Stadium: Dick Dlesk Soccer Stadium; Attendance: 3,137; Referee: Lucas Feathers; Assistant referees: Michael Nickerson; Ross Kleinstuber; Fourth official: Ashley Smyda

November 19	(12) UCF	2–3 (a.e.t.)	Vermont	Orlando, FL
6:00 p.m. EST	Heiskanen 2'; Awoudor 77'	Report	Hartman 17'; Bazini 55'; Johnson 105'	Stadium: UCF Soccer and Track Stadium; Attendance: 912

November 19	(13) UCLA	0–1	Loyola Marymount	Los Angeles, CA
8:00 p.m. EST			Smalls 30'	Stadium: Wallis Annenberg Stadium; Attendance: 1,100

November 19	(4) Georgetown	0–1	James Madison	Washington, D.C.
12:00 p.m. EST		Report	Materazzi 39' (pen.)	Stadium: Shaw Field; Attendance: 1,439; Referee: Mike Stutt; Assistant referees: Ben Pilgrim; Andrew Charron; Fourth official: John Brady

November 19	(3) North Carolina	2–0	Memphis	Chapel Hill, NC
5:00 p.m. EST	Vician 8', 49'	Report		Stadium: Dorrance Field; Attendance: 1,255; Referee: David Erbacher; Assistant referees: Rick Rogers; Jude Carr; Fourth official: John Matta

November 19	(14) Hofstra	2–0	Yale	Hempstead, NY
6:00 p.m. EST	Carmichael 38', 67'	Report		Stadium: Hofstra University Soccer Stadium; Attendance: 1,089; Referee: Jan Halaska; Assistant referees: Justen Lopez; Alexandru Focea; Fourth official: Bobby Baldwin

November 19	(11) Portland	0–3	Oregon State	Portland, OR
8:00 p.m. EST		Report	Farrington 9', 65'; De Gannes 79'	Stadium: Merlo Field; Attendance: 2,695; Referee: Will Niccolls; Assistant referees: J. J. Blodgett; Ryan Jung; Fourth official: Bryan Juarez

November 19	(6) SMU	2–1	Denver	Dallas, TX
8:00 p.m. EST	Sparks 22'; Ortiz 40'	Report	Bassett 68' (pen.)	Stadium: Washburne Soccer and Track Stadium; Attendance: 2,050; Referee: Daniel Radford; Assistant referees: Fevzi Demirhan; Shay Yinka-Kehinde; Fourth official: Todd Wallace

November 19	(7) Virginia	2–1 (a.e.t.)	FIU	Charlottesville, VA
1:00 p.m. EST	Afonso 37', 94'	Report	Domingues 40'	Stadium: Klöckner Stadium; Attendance: 1,372; Referee: Joshua Encarnacion; Assistant referees: Nick Karnovski; Kevin Uitto; Fourth official: Karl Kummer

November 19	(10) Wake Forest	2–3 (a.e.t.)	Indiana	Winston-Salem, NC
5:00 p.m. EST	Jahlane Forbes 21'; Walent 67' (pen.)	Report	Bacharach 54', 94'; Henderlong 73'	Stadium: Spry Stadium; Attendance: 2,059; Referee: Sorin Stoica; Assistant referees: Justin Howard; Nicholas Seymour; Fourth official: Mike Buda

November 19	(15) Duke	1–2 (a.e.t.)	Western Michigan	Durham, NC
1:00 p.m. EST	Daley 35'	Report	Sing 68'; Sharp 93'	Stadium: Koskinen Stadium; Attendance: 1,213; Referee: Nickrod Fateh; Assistant referees: Raymond Thomas; Richard Growgey

November 19	(2) Notre Dame	2–0	Kentucky	Notre Dame, IN
5:00 p.m. EST	Boneau 48'; Spicer 79'	Report		Stadium: Alumni Stadium; Attendance: 1,243; Referee: Calin Radosav; Assistant referees: Nicholas Balcer; Ryan Homsik; Fourth official: Dimitrios Katsimingos

=== Third round ===
November 25	(5) West Virginia	2–1	Vermont	Morgantown, WV
4:00 p.m. EST	Tsukada 4'; Broughton 82'		Johnson 32'	Stadium: Dick Dlesk Soccer Stadium; Attendance: 1,743; Referee: Stephen Foster; Assistant referees: Joseph Knoff; Alexander Parent; Fourth official: Jeffery Skinker

November 25	(6) SMU	1–7	Oregon State	Dallas, TX
8:00 p.m. EST	Berkovitz 7'		Farnos 32'; Williams 44', 67'; Farrington 55', 72'; Castro 62'; Spikner 80'	Stadium: Washburne Soccer and Track Stadium; Attendance: 2,050; Referee: Dimitar Chavdarov; Assistant referees: Joshua Ell; Jason Guillen; Fourth official: Travis Haight

November 25	Loyola Marymount	1–0	James Madison	Los Angeles, CA
10:00 p.m. EST	Kingsford 67'			Stadium: Sullivan Field; Attendance: 1,200; Referee: Brandon Stevis; Assistant referees: Adrian Gonzalez; Eduardo Jeff; Fourth official: Irving Navarro

November 26	(1) Marshall	0–3	(16) Stanford	Huntington, WV
1:00 p.m. EST			Kiil 16'; Reilly 61'; Doyle 81'	Stadium: Hoops Family Field; Attendance: 3,042; Referee: Sorin Stoica; Assistant referees: Max Smith; Ross Kleinstuber; Fourth official: Lucas Feathers

November 26	(7) Virginia	0–1	Indiana	Charlottesville, VA
1:00 p.m. EST			Oduro 11'	Stadium: Klöckner Stadium; Attendance: 2,746; Referee: Nickrod Fateh; Assistant referees: Rick Rogers; Ray Thomas; Fourth official: Kevin Maurer

November 26	(8) New Hampshire	0–1	(9) Clemson	Durham, NH
5:00 p.m. EST			Sylla 35'	Stadium: Wildcat Stadium; Attendance: 3,745; Referee: Kevin Morrison; Assistant referees: Thomas Felice; Benjamin Russell; Fourth official: Daniel Shenk Moreno

November 26	(3) North Carolina	2–2 (a.e.t.) (5–3 p)	(14) Hofstra	Chapel Hill, NC
5:00 p.m. EST	Al-Qaq 21'; Vician 86'		Baker 18'; Carmichael 27'	Stadium: Dorrance Field; Attendance: 1,632; Referee: Amin Hadzic; Assistant referees: Jeffrey Skinker; Nicholas Seymour; Fourth official: Richard Crowgey
	Penalties
	Williams (penalty scored); Huerman (penalty scored); Bawa (penalty scored); Vician (penalty scored); Czech (penalty scored)		(penalty scored) Goldthorp; (penalty missed) Mason; (penalty scored) Carmichael; (penalty scored) Farrell

November 26	(2) Notre Dame	0–0 (a.e.t.) (4–2 p)	Western Michigan	South Bend, IN
5:00 p.m. EST				Stadium: Alumni Stadium; Attendance: 1,768; Referee: Austin Saini; Assistant referees: Michael Nickerson; Cesar Ibarra; Fourth official: Andrew Bigelow
	Penalties
	Roou (penalty scored); Buns (penalty scored); Nto (penalty scored); Russo (penalty scored)		(penalty missed) Sharp; (penalty missed) Sing; (penalty scored) Cooklin; (penalty scored) Sylejmani

=== Quarterfinals ===
December 2	(5) West Virginia	3–1	Loyola Marymount	Morgantown, WV
14:00 EST	McCormick 9'; Navarro 16'; Tsukada 66'	Report	Anderson 2'	Stadium: Dick Dlesk Soccer Stadium; Attendance: 3,109; Referee: JC Griggs; Assistant referees: Nicholas Seymour; Mathew Richardson; Fourth official: Kerven Moon

December 2	(9) Clemson	2–0	(16) Stanford	Clemson, SC
14:00 EST	Gilbert 7'; Trimnal 37'	Report		Stadium: Riggs Field; Attendance: 5,411; Referee: Michael Lavergne; Assistant referees: Jude Carr; Zachary McWhorter; Fourth official: Kyle Johnston

December 2	(3) North Carolina	0–1	Oregon State	Chapel Hill, NC
14:00 EST		Report	Williams 36'	Stadium: Dorrance Field; Attendance: 3,127; Referee: Matthew Thompson; Assistant referees: Brian Marshall; Jarred Mosher; Fourth official: Jeremy Smith

December 2	(2) Notre Dame	1–1 (5–4 p)	Indiana	South Bend, IN
14:00 EST	Russo 17'	Report	McDonald 63'	Stadium: Alumni Stadium; Attendance: 3,108; Referee: Nikola Aleksic; Assistant referees: Cory Richardson; Art Arustamyan; Fourth official: Heber Estrada
	Penalties
	Burns (penalty scored); Roou (penalty scored); Nto (penalty scored); Ferguson (penalty scored); Russo (penalty scored)		(penalty missed) Maher; (penalty scored) Mihalic; (penalty scored) Helmer; (penalty scored) Barger; (penalty scored) Bezerra

=== Men's College Cup Semifinals ===
December 8	(9) Clemson	1–0	(5) West Virginia	Louisville, KY
6:00 pm EST	Shawn Smart 37'	Report	(yellow card) 23' Ryan Baer; (yellow card) 89' Tsukada	Stadium: Lynn Family Stadium; Referee: Calin Radosav; Assistant referees: Baboucarr Jallow; Katarzyna Wasiak; Fourth official: Leland Grant

December 8	Oregon State	0–1	(2) Notre Dame	Louisville, KY
8:30 pm EST	Luis Castillo (yellow card) 21'; Dante Williams (yellow card) 27'; Logan Farrington (yellow card) 38'	Report	(yellow card) 34' Mitch Ferguson; 51', (yellow card) 61' Eno Nto	Stadium: Lynn Family Stadium; Attendance: 3,853; Referee: David Erbacher; Assistant referees: Michael Nickerson; James Duling; Fourth official: Leland Grant

=== Men's College Cup Final ===
December 11	(9) Clemson	2–1	(2) Notre Dame	Louisville, KY
6:00 pm EST	Brandon Parrish 27'; Pape Mar Boye (yellow card) 42'; Joran Gerbet (yellow card) 57'; Mohamed Seye (yellow card) 67'; Ousmane Sylla 70', (yellow card) 90'; Gael Gibert (yellow card) 87'; Joseph Andema (yellow card) 89'	Report	Paddy Burns 89' (pen.)	Stadium: Lynn Family Stadium; Attendance: 4,449; Referee: Dimitar Chavdarov; Assistant referees: Matthew Rodman; Justin Howard; Fourth official: Aaron Hernandez

== Records by conference ==
Conference	Bids	Record	Pct.	R32	R16	E8	F4	CG	NC
ACC	9	11–8–3	.568	8	4	3	2	2	1
Pac-12	3	5–3–0	.625	3	2	2	1	–	–
Sun Belt	5	6–5–0	.545	5	3	1	1	–	–
WCC	3	4–2–1	.643	2	1	1	–	–	–
Big Ten	1	3–0–1	.875	1	1	1	–	–	–
America East	3	3–3–0	.500	2	2	–	–	–	–
American	4	4–4–0	.500	4	1	–	–	–	–
Missouri Valley	2	3–2–0	.600	2	1	–	–	–	–
CAA	1	1–1–0	.500	1	1	–	–	–	–
Big East	2	0–1–0	.000	1	–	–	–	–	–
Summit	2	1–2–0	.333	1	–	–	–	–	–
WAC	2	1–2–0	.333	1	–	–	–	–	–
Ivy	1	1–1–0	.500	1	–	–	–	–	–
Others	11	0–10–1	.000	–	–	–	–	–	–

- The R32, S16, E8, F4, CG, and NC columns indicate how many teams from each conference were in the Round of 32 (second round), Round of 16 (third round), Quarterfinals (Elite Eight), Semifinals (Final Four), Championship Game, and National Champion, respectively.
- The following conferences failed to place a team into the round of 32: ASUN, Atlantic 10, Big South, Big West, Horizon, MAAC, Northeast, Ohio Valley, Patriot, and SoCon. The conference's records have been consolidated in the other row.

== Statistics ==
=== Goalscorers ===
There were 128 goals scored in 47 matches, for an average of 2.72 goals per match.

4 goals

- (United States) Logan Farrington – Oregon State
- (United States) Charlie Sharp – Western Michigan

3 goals

- (Northern Ireland) Ryan Carmichael – Hofstra
- (Slovakia) Martin Vician – North Carolina
- (United States) Dante Williams – Oregon State
- (Israel) Yaniv Bazini – Vermont

2 goals

- (Senegal) Ousmane Sylla – Clemson
- (Spain) Hugo Bacharach – Indiana
- (Ghana) Collins Oduro – Indiana
- (Spain) Rodrigo Robles – James Madison
- (United States) Ben Damge – Kentucky
- (England) Ryan Kingsford – Loyola Marymount
- (England) Tyger Smalls – Loyola Marymount
- (Brazil) Lineker dos Santos – Memphis
- (United States) Jackson Kiil – Stanford
- (Armenia) Nicholas Kaloukian – Syracuse
- (United States) Carter Johnson – Vermont
- (Brazil) Leo Afonso – Virginia
- (Japan) Yutaro Tsukada – West Virginia

1 goal

- (Canada) Eitan Rosen – Boston University
- (Germany) Luis Müller – Cal Baptist
- (Slovenia) Filip Jauk – Charlotte
- (France) Arthur Duquenne – Clemson
- (United States) Brandon Parrish – Clemson
- (United States) Shawn Smart – Clemson
- (United States) Logan Brown – Dayton
- (France) Kenji Mboma Dem – Dayton
- (Norway) Casper Svendby – Dayton
- (United States) Sam Bassett – Denver
- (United States) Tyler Schommer – Denver
- (United States) Bryce Willoughby – Denver
- (Antigua and Barbuda) Amir Daley – Duke
- (Canada) Alex Krakowiak – James Madison
- (Italy) Davide Materazzi – James Madison
- (Canada) Simon Afrifa – FIU
- (Portugal) João Domíngues – FIU
- (England) Teddy Baker – Hofstra
- (Finland) Emil Jääskeläinen – LIU
- (Nigeria) Maouloune Goumballe – Indiana
- (United States) Karsen Henderlong – Indiana
- (Trinidad and Tobago) Tyrese Spicer – Lipscomb
- (United States) David Boccuzzo – Louisville
- (United States) Josh Jones – Louisville
- (United States) Bryce LeBel – Louisville
- (United States) Brandon McManus – Louisville
- (United States) Braden Fidelak – Loyola Marymount
- (England) Tyger Smalls – Loyola Marymount
- (Ghana) Alexander Adjetey – Marshall
- (Jamaica) Matthew Bell – Marshall
- (Spain) Pablo Simon – Marshall
- (Spain) Jesus Barea – Missouri State
- (Italy) Mattia Petricca – Missouri State
- (United States) Taig Healy – New Hampshire
- (United States) Eli Goldman – New Hampshire
- (United States) Dylan Maxon – New Hampshire
- (Palestine) Ahmad Al-Qaq – North Carolina
- (United States) Bryce Boneau – Notre Dame
- (United States) Nolan Spicer – Notre Dame
- (Chile) Vicho Castro – Oregon State
- (Spain) Fran Cortijo – Oregon State
- (Trinidad and Tobago) Andrew De Gannes – Oregon State
- (Spain) Arnau Farnós – Oregon State
- (United States) Ellis Spikner – Oregon State
- (United States) Michael Sullivan – Pittsburgh
- (Norway) Albert Thorsen – Pittsburgh
- (United States) Cesar Bahena – San Diego
- (United States) Mo Mohamed – Seattle U
- (Russia) Pavel Dashin – SIU Edwardsville
- (Israel) Niv Berkovitz – SMU
- (Honduras) Jose Ortiz – SMU
- (United States) Bailey Sparks – SMU
- (United States) Zach Bohane – Stanford
- (Hong Kong) Liam Doyle – Stanford
- (United States) Shane de Flores – Stanford
- (United States) Will Reilly – Stanford
- (Canada) Josh Belluz – Syracuse
- (Senegal) Babacar Diene – Rider
- (United States) Mario Anaya – UC Irvine
- (Mexico) Rafael Espinoza – UC Irvine
- (France) Clarence Awoudor – UCF
- (Finland) Saku Heiskanen – UCF
- (Gibraltar) Niels Hartman – Vermont
- (Germany) Nick Lockermann – Vermont
- (United States) Jahlane Forbes – Wake Forest
- (Haiti) Vladimir Walent – Wake Forest
- (United States) Dylan Sing – Western Michigan
- (England) Max Broughton – West Virginia
- (Australia) Max Rogers – Yale

Source: NCAA

== See also ==
- 2023 NCAA Division I women's soccer tournament
