= Sydney Wathuta =

South African soccer player (born 2004)

Personal information
- Date of birth: June 11, 2004 (age 22)
- Place of birth: East London, South Africa
- Height: 6 ft 3 in (1.91 m)
- Position: Forward

Team information
- Current team: Orange County SC (on loan from Colorado Rapids)
- Number: 7

Youth career
- Power FC
- Calgary Blizzard SC
- New Frontier SC
- 2022–2023: Vancouver Whitecaps FC

College career
Years	Team	Apps	(Gls)
2023–2024	Vermont Catamounts	39	(3)

Senior career*
Years	Team	Apps	(Gls)
2022–2023	Whitecaps FC Academy	12	(2)
2023	Whitecaps FC 2	2	(0)
2024	Vermont Green FC	0	(0)
2024	Whitecaps FC Academy	8	(4)
2025	Colorado Rapids 2	18	(6)
2025	→ Colorado Rapids (loan)	1	(0)
2026–	Colorado Rapids	0	(0)
2026	→ Colorado Rapids 2 (loan)	20	(2)
2026–	→ Orange County SC (loan)	4	(0)
- * Club domestic league appearances and goals as of 13:54, 10 November 2026 (UTC)

Sydney Wathuta (born June 11, 2004) is a South African professional soccer player who plays for Orange County SC in the USL Championship on loan from Major League Soccer club Colorado Rapids.

== Early life ==
Wathuta was born in East London, South Africa, to Kenyan parents. His family moved to Calgary, Canada, and that is where he grew up.

Wathuta played youth soccer with Power FC, Calgary Blizzard SC and New Frontier SC. In 2014, he had a training stint in England with Brentford. In January 2022, he joined the Vancouver Whitecaps FC Academy.

== College career ==
In 2023, Wathuta began attending the University of Vermont, where he played for the men's soccer team. On September 26, 2023, he scored his first collegiate goal in a 1–1 draw against the UMass Minutemen, which earned him America East Conference Co-Rookie of the Week honours. At the end of his first season, he was named to the America East Conference All-Rookie Team. Ahead of his sophomore season, he was named to the America East All-Preseason team. That season, he helped Vermont win their first NCAA title and finished the season second in the nation with 14 assists. At the end of the season, he was named the America East Midfielder of the Year and named to the All-America East First Team and All-ECAC Second Team.

== Club career ==
In 2022, Wathuta began playing with the Whitecaps FC Academy in League1 British Columbia. In 2023, he made two appearances for Whitecaps FC 2 in MLS Next Pro.

In 2024, he joined USL League Two side Vermont Green FC for their 2024 U.S. Open Cup matches in March and April. He then subsequently returned to the Whitecaps FC Academy for the 2024 season. On July 14, 2024, he scored a hat trick in a 4–3 victory over Burnaby FC.

At the 2025 MLS SuperDraft, Wathuta was selected in the first round (16th overall) by the Colorado Rapids. In January 2025, he signed a professional contract with their second team, Colorado Rapids 2, in MLS Next Pro. On March 7, 2025, he made his debut in a match against Austin FC II. He scored his first goal on May 18, 2025, in a 2–1 victory over the Real Monarchs. In July 2025, he signed a short-term loan with the Colorado Rapids first team ahead of a pair of Leagues Cup matches. On August 7, 2025, he signed another short-term loan, making his first team debut the same day in a Leagues Cup match against Mexican side Cruz Azul, recording an assist in a 2–2 draw. He signed another two short-term loans that season. On August 16, 2025, he made his MLS debut as a late game substitute against.

In February 2026, he signed a first team contract with the Colorado Rapids through June 2027, with two additional options for the 2027–28 and 2028–29 seasons.

In September 2026, Wathuta was loaned from Colorado Rapids to Orange County SC for the remainder of the 2026 USL Championship season.

== Career statistics ==
As of December 14, 2025

Club	Season	League			Playoffs		National Cup		Other		Total	
Club	Season	Division	Apps	Goals	Apps	Goals	Apps	Goals	Apps	Goals	Apps	Goals
Whitecaps FC Academy	2022	League1 British Columbia	2	0	—		—		—		2	0
Whitecaps FC Academy	2023	League1 British Columbia	10	2	2	2	—		—		12	4
Whitecaps FC Academy	Total		12	2	2	2	0	0	0	0	14	4
Whitecaps FC 2	2023	MLS Next Pro	2	0	—		—		—		2	0
Vermont Green FC	2024	USL League Two	0	0	0	0	2	0	—		2	0
Whitecaps FC Academy	2024	League1 British Columbia	8	4	0	0	—		—		8	4
Colorado Rapids 2	2025	MLS Next Pro	18	6	4	0	—		—		22	6
Colorado Rapids (loan)	2025	League1 British Columbia	1	0	—		—		1	0	2	0
Career total			41	12	6	2	2	0	1	0	50	14

== Honours ==
Vermont Catamounts

- NCAA Division I men's soccer tournament: 2024
