= 2024 NCAA Division I men's soccer tournament =

2024 edition of the NCAA Division I men's soccer tournament

- Classification: Division I
- Teams: 48
- Matches: 47
- Site: WakeMed Soccer Park (semifinal and final); Cary, North Carolina
- Champions: Vermont (1st title)
- Winning coach: Rob Dow (1st title)
- MVP: Maximilian Kissel (Offensive); Niklas Herceg (Defensive) (Vermont)
- Broadcast: ESPN2, ESPNU, ESPN+, ACCN

The 2024 NCAA Division I men's soccer tournament was the 66th edition of the NCAA Division I men's soccer tournament, a postseason tournament that determined the national champion of the 2024 NCAA Division I men's soccer season.

The College Cup was played on December 13 and December 16 at WakeMed Soccer Park in Cary, North Carolina. The University of Vermont defeated Marshall University 2–1 in overtime in the final to win the championship, the school's first national championship.

== Qualification ==
All Division I men's soccer programs are eligible to qualify for the tournament. 21 teams received automatic bids by winning their conference tournaments, one team received an automatic bid by claiming the conference regular season crown (the West Coast Conference does not hold a conference tournament), and an additional 26 teams earned at-large bids based on their regular season records.

Automatic bids
| Conference | Team | Date qualified | Record | Appearance | Last bid |
|---|---|---|---|---|---|
| American | Charlotte | November 17 | 11–2–5 | 18th | 2023 |
| America East | Vermont | November 17 | 11–2–5 | 14th | 2023 |
| ACC | Wake Forest | November 17 | 10–4–7 | 28th | 2023 |
| Atlantic 10 | Dayton | November 17 | 13–2–3 | 4th | 2023 |
| ASUN | North Florida | November 16 | 7–7–4 | 2nd | 2015 |
| Big East | Georgetown | November 17 | 11–4–5 | 15th | 2023 |
| Big South | Gardner-Webb | November 16 | 12–3–3 | 2nd | 2006 |
| Big Ten | Ohio State | November 17 | 14–1–3 | 12th | 2022 |
| Big West | UC Davis | November 15 | 10–5–6 | 4th | 2019 |
| CAA | Hofstra | November 17 | 14–4–2 | 9th | 2023 |
| Horizon | Robert Morris | November 17 | 9–6–3 | 4th | 2005 |
| Ivy | Princeton | November 17 | 12–6–0 | 11th | 2021 |
| MAAC | Iona | November 17 | 11–4–3 | 2nd | 2019 |
| Missouri Valley | Evansville | November 16 | 11–6–3 (Note: Missouri Valley website standings not updated with results from conference tournament.) | 12th | 1996 |
| Northeast | LIU | November 17 | 8–4–7 | 18th | 2023 |
| Ohio Valley | SIUE | November 16 | 12–4–3 | 17th | 2023 |
| Patriot | Bucknell | November 16 | 7–6–6 | 8th | 2014 |
| SoCon | Furman | November 17 | 9–3–5 | 12th | 2018 |
| Summit League | Kansas City | November 16 | 12–4–3 | 4th | 2008 |
| Sun Belt (Note: West Virginia is a men's soccer affiliate member of the Sun Belt Conference, as its conference; the Big-12 Conference does not sponsor men's soccer.) | West Virginia | November 17 | 12–1–7 | 17th | 2023 |
| WAC | Seattle U | November 16 | 12–4–3 | 7th | 2023 |
| West Coast | San Diego | No Tournament | 13–2–2 | 17th | 2023 |

At-large bids
| Conference | Team | Record | Appearance | Last bid |
|---|---|---|---|---|
| ACC | Clemson | 14–2–4 | 37th | 2023 |
| ACC | Duke | 11–3–4 | 31st | 2023 |
| ACC | NC State | 8–4–5 | 17th | 2019 |
| ACC | North Carolina | 9–4–4 | 31st | 2023 |
| ACC | SMU | 10–2–6 | 36th | 2023 |
| ACC | Pittsburgh | 12–5–0 | 8th | 2023 |
| ACC | Stanford | 9–5–4 | 22nd | 2023 |
| ACC | Virginia | 10–6–3 | 44th | 2023 |
| Atlantic 10 | Fordham | 8–5–5 | 6th | 2020 |
| Atlantic 10 | UMass | 10–3–5 | 6th | 2020 |
| Atlantic 10 | Saint Louis | 8–4–8 | 51st | 2022 |
| Big East (Note: Akron is a men's soccer affiliate member of the Big East Conference, as its conference; the Mid-American Conference does not sponsor men's soccer.) | Akron | 11–4–4 | 32nd | 2022 |
| Big East | Providence | 12–5–3 | 12th | 2021 |
| Big Ten | Indiana | 10–4–5 | 49th | 2023 |
| Big Ten | Maryland | 8–5–5 | 41st | 2022 |
| Big Ten | Michigan | 8–4–7 | 9th | 2019 |
| Big Ten | UCLA | 7–5–6 | 49th | 2023 |
| Big Ten | Washington | 8–5–6 | 29th | 2022 |
| Big West | UC Santa Barbara | 11–5–4 | 15th | 2021 |
| Ivy | Cornell | 12–3–2 | 12th | 2022 |
| Ivy | Penn | 14–3–1 | 12th | 2022 |
| Missouri Valley (Note: Western Michigan is a men's soccer affiliate member of the Missouri Valley Conference; as its conference, the Mid-American Conference does not sponsor men's soccer.) | Missouri State | 12–3–2 | 9th | 2023 |
| Missouri Valley | Western Michigan | 11–2–6 | 5th | 2023 |
| Summit League | Denver | 12–3–4 | 13th | 2023 |
| Sun Belt | Marshall | 11–1–7 | 6th | 2023 |
| West Coast (Note: Oregon State is a men's soccer affiliate member of the West Coast Conference, as its conference; the Pac-12 Conference, does not sponsor men's soccer.) | Oregon State | 10–4–3 | 9th | 2023 |

=== Seeded teams ===
The top 16 teams are seeded and earn a bye to the second round of the tournament.

Seeded teams
| Seed | School | Conference | Record | Berth type | United Soccer Coaches ranking | RPI ranking |
|---|---|---|---|---|---|---|
| 1 | Ohio State | Big Ten | 14–1–3 | Automatic | 1st | 1st |
| 2 | Pittsburgh | ACC | 12–5–0 | At-large | 9th | 4th |
| 3 | Denver | Summit League | 12–3–4 | At-large | 4th | 2nd |
| 4 | Georgetown | Big East | 11–4–5 | Automatic | 24th | 3rd |
| 5 | Dayton | Atlantic 10 | 13–2–3 | Automatic | 5th | 6th |
| 6 | Penn | Ivy | 14–3–1 | At-large | 12th | 7th |
| 7 | Hofstra | CAA | 14–4–2 | Automatic | 18th | 5th |
| 8 | Wake Forest | ACC | 10–4–7 | Automatic | NR | 9th |
| 9 | Clemson | ACC | 14–2–4 | At-large | 7th | 12th |
| 10 | Duke | ACC | 11–3–4 | At-large | 2nd | 10th |
| 11 | Virginia | ACC | 10–6–3 | At-large | NR | 14th |
| 12 | SMU | ACC | 10–2–6 | At-large | 15th | 15th |
| 13 | Marshall | Sun Belt | 11–1–7 | At-large | 8th | 8th |
| 14 | Indiana | Big Ten | 10–4–5 | At-large | 6th | 21st |
| 15 | Missouri State | Missouri Valley | 12–3–2 | At-large | 11th | 13th |
| 16 | Stanford | ACC | 9–5–4 | At-large | NR | 11th |

== Bracket ==
The bracket was announced on Monday, November 18, 2024. First round games were to be played on November 21 at campus sites.

=== Ohio State Region 1 ===
First round November 21
Western Michigan* | 5
SIUE | 1
UCLA* | 0
UC Santa Barbara | 1
Providence* | 2
Bucknell | 1
Maryland* | 5
LIU | 2

Second round November 24
1 | Ohio State* | 2
Western Michigan | 1
UC Santa Barbara | 2 (5)
16 | Stanford* | 2 (6)
9 | Clemson* | 2
Providence | 0
Maryland | 1
8 | Wake Forest* | 2

Third round Nov 30 – Dec 1
1 | Ohio State* | 0 (4)
16 | Stanford | 0 (2)
9 | Clemson | 1
8 | Wake Forest* | 2

Quarterfinals; December 6–7
1 | Ohio State* | 3
8 | Wake Forest | 0

*Host institution

==== Schedule ====
===== First round =====
| November 21 | Western Michigan | 5–1 | SIUE | Kalamazoo, MI |
| 1:00 p.m. EST | 3' Owen Smith; 38' Christian Shannon; 50', 62' Greyson Mercer; (yellow card) 67' Owen Smith; 82' Duarte Chapelas | Report | Pavel Dashin 71' (pen.); Stephan Moreira (yellow card) 63'; Archie McDonnell (yellow card) 71'; Nic Muench (yellow card) 73'; Wes Gibson (yellow card) 85'; Patrick Coleman (yellow card) 90' | Stadium: WMU Soccer Complex; Attendance: 367; Referee: Nikola Aleksic; Assistant referees: Christian Little; Ryan Homik; Fourth official: Cesar Ibarra |

| November 21 | Maryland | 5–2 | LIU | College Park, MD |
| 7:00 p.m. EST | 5' Alex Nitzl; 67' (pen.) Leon Koehl; 68' Sadam Masereka; 74' Luca Costabile; 85' Max Rogers; (yellow card) 90' Albi Ndrenika | Report | Stephane Njike 43'; Papa Sow 48'; Niklas Thanhofer (yellow card) 54'; Alan Martinez (yellow card) 76' | Stadium: Ludwig Field; Attendance: 938; Referee: Andrea Pileri; Assistant referees: Jay Hutchinson; Alexander Tyshkevych; Fourth official: Ryan Nee |

| November 21 | Providence | 2–1 | Bucknell | Providence, RI |
| 7:00 p.m. EST | 12' Aidan Davock; 32' Israel Dos Santos Neto; (yellow card) 75' Brandon Marshall | Report | Zane Domsohn 43'; Jack Lucas (yellow card) 85'; Cade Whitmire (yellow card) 86' | Stadium: Chapey Field; Attendance: 829; Referee: Matthew Mercier; Assistant referees: Andre Carr; Jose Mendes; Fourth official: Thomas Felice |

| November 21 | UCLA | 0–1 (a.e.t.) | UC Santa Barbara | Los Angeles, CA |
| 10:00 p.m. EST | (yellow card) 38' Jose Contell; (yellow card) 79' Tarun Karumanchi | Report | Isaiah Barber (yellow card) 72'; Nicolas Hald Willumsen 93' | Stadium: Wallis Annenberg Stadium; Attendance: 1,191; Referee: Michael Gebreslassie; Assistant referees: Adrian Gonzalez; Edward Hernandez; Fourth official: Matthew Tanious |

===== Second round =====
| November 24 | #1 Ohio State | 2–1 | Western Michigan | Columbus, OH |
| 5:00 p.m. EST | Siggi Magnusson 41'; David Wrona (yellow card) 58'; Michael Adedokun 65' | Report | 33' Owen Smith; (yellow card) 52' Team; (yellow card) 57' Tanner Hodgson; (yellow card) 90' Roni Sylejmani | Stadium: Jesse Owens Memorial Stadium; Attendance: 1,713; Referee: Calin Radosav; Assistant referees: Michael Nickerson; Justin Tatsak; Fourth official: Youssef Eimessoussi |

| November 24 | #9 Clemson | 2–0 | Providence | Clemson, SC |
| 6:00 p.m. EST | Ransford Gyan (yellow card) 39'; Wahabu Musah 43', 78' | Report | (yellow card) 23' Pearse O'Brien; (yellow card) 32' Brandon Marshall | Stadium: Riggs Field; Attendance: 2,606; Referee: Amin Hadzic; Assistant referees: Thomas Brigman; Benjamin Oakley; Fourth official: Jarred Mosher |

| November 24 | #8 Wake Forest | 2–1 | Maryland | Winston-Salem, NC |
| 6:00 p.m. EST | Dylan Borso 12'; Jose Perez (yellow card) 50'; Travis Smith Jr. (yellow card) 51'; Bo Cummins (yellow card) 53'; Cooper Flax 63'; Trace Alpin (yellow card) 69'; Team (yellow card) 69' | Report | 42' Max Rogers; (yellow card) 63' Team; (yellow card) 66' Bjarne Thiesen; (yellow card) 69' Chris Steinleitner; (yellow card) 88' William Kulvik | Stadium: Spry Soccer Stadium; Attendance: 2,034; Referee: Mike Stutt; Assistant referees: Jason White; Kevin Uitto; Fourth official: John Matto |

| November 24 | #16 Stanford | 2–2 (a.e.t.) (6–5 p) | UC Santa Barbara | Stanford, CA |
| 8:00 p.m. EST | Noah Adnan 33', 45'; Rowan Schnebly (yellow card) 72'; Team (yellow card) 72'; Dylan Hooper (yellow card) 98' | Report | 50' Haruki Utsumi; (yellow card) 67' Team; (yellow card) 72' Ocean Salari; (yellow card) 72' Ramses Martinez; (yellow card) 72' Filip Basili; 90' Zac Siebenlist | Stadium: Maloney Field; Attendance: 2,300; Referee: Brandon Stevis; Assistant referees: Peter Hanson; Andrew Hanks; Fourth official: Victor Mba |
| | Penalties |
| | Will Reilly (penalty scored); Dylan Hooper (penalty scored); Zach Bohane (penalty scored); Noah Adnan (penalty missed); Alex Chow (penalty scored); Duncan Jarvie (penalty scored) | | (penalty scored) Mikkel Goeling; (penalty scored) Henrique Bueno; (penalty scored) Nicholas Willumsen; (penalty missed) Ocean Salari; (penalty scored) Alexis Ledoux; (penalty scored) Kaden Standish; (penalty missed) Peleg Brown |

===== Third round =====
| December 1 | #1 Ohio State | 0–0 (a.e.t.) (4–2 p) | #16 Stanford | Columbus, OH |
| 5:00 p.m. EST | Thomas Gilej (yellow card) 20'; Siggi Magnusson (yellow card) 45'; David Wrona (yellow card) 108' | Report | (yellow card) 45' Rowan Schnebly; (yellow card) 56' Palmer Bank; (yellow card) 104' Dylan Hooper | Stadium: Jesse Owens Memorial Stadium; Attendance: 1,136; Referee: Nikola Aleksic; Assistant referees: Andrew Bigelow; Race Williams; Fourth official: Ali Zolgharnain |
| | Penalties |
| | Marko Borkovic (penalty scored); Thomas Gilej (penalty scored); Parker Grinstead (penalty scored); Anthony Samways (penalty scored) | | (penalty missed) Will Reilly; (penalty missed) Zach Bohane; (penalty scored) Dylan Hooper; (penalty scored) Alex Chow |

| December 1 | #8 Wake Forest | 2–1 (a.e.t.) | #9 Clemson | Winston-Salem, NC |
| 6:00 p.m. EST | Ryan Belal 43'; Pariss Mitchell (yellow card) 70'; Dylan Borso 92' | Report | 21' Ransford Gyan; (yellow card) 86' Titus Sandy Jr | Stadium: Spry Soccer Stadium; Attendance: 2,273; Referee: Dimitar Chavdarov; Assistant referees: Andrew Charron; Justin Howard; Fourth official: John Rush |

===== Quarterfinals =====
| December 7 | #1 Ohio State | 3–0 | #8 Wake Forest | Columbus, OH |
| 5:00 p.m. EST | Thomas Gilej (yellow card) 34'; Michael Adedokun 40' (pen.), 59'; David Ajagbe 48'; Deylen Vellios (yellow card) 88' | Report | (yellow card) 45' Prince Amponsah; (yellow card) 72' Team | Stadium: Jesse Owens Memorial Stadium; Attendance: 1,763; Referee: Austin Saini; Assistant referees: Sean West; Fernando Pina; Fourth official: Noah Matos |

Rankings shown are national seeds.

=== Georgetown Region 2 ===
First round November 21
Michigan* | 2
Robert Morris | 0
Washington* | 0 (3)
Seattle | 0 (0)
North Carolina* | 0 (3)
Furman | 0 (5)
NC State* | 2
Charlotte | 1

Second round November 24
5 | Dayton* | 2
Michigan | 0
Washington | 1
12 | SMU* | 2
13 | Marshall* | 4
Furman | 0
NC State | 2
4 | Georgetown* | 0

Third round Nov 30 – Dec 1
5 | Dayton* | 1
12 | SMU | 3
13 | Marshall* | 2
NC State | 1

Quarterfinals; December 6–7
12 | SMU* | 2
13 | Marshall | 3

*Host institution

==== Schedule ====
===== First round =====
| November 21 | North Carolina | 0–0 (a.e.t.) (3–5 p) | Furman | Chapel Hill, NC |
| 5:00 p.m. EST | (yellow card) 106' Bertil Hansen | Report | Luke Hutzell (yellow card) 43'; Christian Kraus (yellow card) 70'; Jack Travis (yellow card) 104'; Aaron Salinas (yellow card) 104' | Stadium: Dorrance Field; Attendance: 801; Referee: Amin Hadzic; Assistant referees: Marcus Moss; Thomas Rutherford; Fourth official: Chris Zuerner |
| | Penalties |
| | (penalty scored) Sam Williams; (penalty scored) Martin Vician; (penalty scored) Matthew Acosta; (penalty missed) Luke Hille | | Ivan Agyaakwah (penalty scored); Christian Kraus (penalty scored); Wilfer Bustamante (penalty scored); Slade Starnes (penalty scored); Diego Hernandez (penalty scored) |

| November 21 | Michigan | 2–0 | Robert Morris | Ann Arbor, MI |
| 6:00 p.m. EST | 13' Matthew Fisher; (yellow card) 44' Jason Bucknor; (yellow card) 69' Jonathan Nabaka; 80' Duilio Herrera | Report | Victor Thompson, Jr. (yellow card) 57'; Gabe Norris (yellow card) 66'; Lucas Barsoee (yellow card) 79'; William Dodzi Afawubo (yellow card) 84'; Kyler Miller (yellow card) 87'; Kai McLoughlin (yellow card) 88' | Stadium: U-M Soccer Stadium; Attendance: 623; Referee: Sorin Stoica; Assistant referees: Rob Ruta; John Douglas; Fourth official: Aaron Fong |

| November 21 | NC State | 2–1 (a.e.t.) | Charlotte | Raleigh, NC |
| 7:00 p.m. EST | 86' Donavan Phillip; 103' Nikola Markovic | Report | Jaedon Richardson (yellow card) 77'; Daniel Moore (yellow card) 84'; Abubacarr Fofana 89'; Riyon Tori (yellow card) 89' | Stadium: Dail Soccer Field; Attendance: 1154; Referee: Brandon Marion; Assistant referees: Jeremy Smith; Richard Crowgey; Fourth official: Rick Rogers |

| November 21 | Washington | 0–0 (a.e.t.) (3–0 p) | Seattle | Seattle, WA |
| 10:00 p.m. EST | (yellow card) 37' Richie Aman; (yellow card) 46' Charlie Kosakoff; (yellow card) 55' Harrison Bertos; (yellow card) 64' Coach | Report | Taketo Onodera (yellow card) 36'; Andre Philibbosian (yellow card) 36'; Mo Mohamed (yellow card) 82'; Demian Alvarez (yellow card) 88' | Stadium: Husky Soccer Stadium; Attendance: 2987; Referee: Cedric Adams; Assistant referees: Baboucar Jallow; Raymond Moffatte, Jr. Fourth official: Chris Turner |
| | Penalties |
| | (penalty scored) Charlie Kosakoff; (penalty missed) Nick O'Brien; (penalty scored) Chris Meyers; (penalty scored) Egor Akulov | | Taketo Onodera (penalty missed); Edgar Leon (penalty missed); Demian Alvarez (penalty missed) |

===== Second round =====
| November 24 | #4 Georgetown | 0–2 | NC State | Washington, DC |
| 12:00 p.m. EST | Tate Lampman (yellow card) 84' | Report | 27' Drew Lovelace; (yellow card) 58' Nikola Markovic; 66' Donavan Phillip | Stadium: Shaw Field; Attendance: 1,899; Referee: Nickrod Fateh; Assistant referees: Conor McCloskey; J.T. Alukonis; Fourth official: Max Smith |

| November 24 | #13 Marshall | 4–0 | Furman | Huntington, WV |
| 2:00 p.m. EST | Lineker Rodrigues dos Santos 22', 40'; Haruhi Taneda 40'; Tarik Pannholzer 41' | Report | (yellow card) 44' Landon Hill; (yellow card) 61' Caleb Johnson; (yellow card) 65' Jack Travis; (yellow card) 70' Luke Hutzell; (yellow card) 78' Gabe Cox | Stadium: Hoops Family Field; Attendance: 2,257; Referee: Lucas Feathers; Assistant referees: Eric Usher; Alex Adkins; Fourth official: Richard Crowgey |

| November 24 | #5 Dayton | 2–0 | Michigan | Dayton, OH |
| 7:00 p.m. EST | Dario Caetano (yellow card) 39'; Ethan Sassine 39', 60' | Report | (yellow card) 56' Murphy Parker; (yellow card) 61' Joao Paulo Ramos | Stadium: Baujan Field; Attendance: 2,513; Referee: Nicholas Balcer; Assistant referees: Shane Foley; Noah Matos Hernandez; Fourth official: Aaron Hernandez |

| November 24 | #12 SMU | 2–1 | Washington | Dallas, TX |
| 7:00 p.m. EST | Owen Zarnick (yellow card) 17', (goal) 89'; Stephan Soghomonian 40'; Nikola Djordjevic (yellow card) 50'; Bailey Sparks (yellow card) 61' | Report | (yellow card) 27' Caden Buckley; 30' Joe Dale; (yellow card) 68' Zach Ramsey; (yellow card) 71' Chris Meyers; (yellow card) 90' Team | Stadium: Washburne Soccer and Track Stadium; Attendance: 1,876; Referee: Daniel Radford; Assistant referees: Fevzi Demirhan; Joshua Ell; Fourth official: Jarrod Tackel |

===== Third round =====
| November 30 | #5 Dayton | 1–3 | #12 SMU | Dayton, OH |
| 7:00 p.m. EST | Martin Bakken 1'; Felix Buabeng (yellow card) 87' (yellow-red card) 90'; Dario Caetano (yellow card) 89'; Joseph Melto Quiah (yellow card) 89' | Report | 18' Kyran Chambron Pinho; 65' (pen.) Bailey Sparks; 72' Owen Zarnick; (yellow card) 73' Daniel Escorcia; (yellow card) 81', (yellow card) 90' Team; (yellow card) 81' Owen Zarnick | Stadium: Baujan Field; Attendance: 1,108; Referee: Calin Radosav; Assistant referees: Cory Richardson; Mateusz Dulski; Fourth official: Kevin Fikar |

| November 30 | #13 Marshall | 2–1 | NC State | Huntington, WV |
| 2:00 p.m. EST | Lineker Rodrigues dos Santos 9', 37'; Marco Silva (yellow card) 75'; Aymane Sordo (yellow card) 84'; Team (yellow card) 84'; Taimu Okiyoshi (yellow card) 89' | Report | (yellow card) 45' Team; (yellow card) 75' Samuel Terranova; 77' Vusumzi Plamana | Stadium: Hoops Family Field; Attendance: 2,048; Referee: Sorin Stoica; Assistant referees: William Gathers; Ross Kleinstuber; Fourth official: Richard Crowgey |

===== Quarterfinals =====
| December 8 | #12 SMU | 2–3 | #13 Marshall | Dallas, TX |
| 2:00 p.m. CST | Enzo Panozzo (yellow card) 7'; Daniel Escorcia (yellow card) 26' (yellow-red card) 86'; Bailey Sparks (yellow card) 56'; Milton Lopez 58', 83'; Cameron Victor (yellow card) 62'; Lamar Bynum (yellow card) 80' (yellow-red card) 90'; Team (yellow card) 86' | Report | (yellow card) 13' Tarik Pannholzer; 24' Lineker Rodrigues dos Santos; (yellow card) 38' Takahiro Fujita; 56' Marco Silva; (yellow card) 69' Taimu Okiyoshi; 76' Pablo Simon; (yellow card) 79' Ryan Holmes | Stadium: Washburne Soccer and Track Stadium; Attendance: 1,635 |

Rankings shown are national seeds.

=== Denver Region 3 ===
First round November 21
Oregon State* | 0
Gardner-Webb | 1
Akron* | 1
Princeton | 0
West Virginia* | 2
North Florida | 1
UMass* | 2
Evansville | 1

Second round November 24
3 | Denver* | 3
Gardner-Webb | 0
Akron | 1
14 | Indiana* | 2
11 | Virginia* | 2
West Virginia | 1
UMass | 1
6 | Penn* | 0

Third round Nov 30 – Dec 1
3 | Denver* | 1
14 | Indiana | 0
11 | Virginia* | 0
UMass | 1

Quarterfinals; December 6–7
3 | Denver* | 3
UMass | 0

*Host institution

==== Schedule ====
===== First round =====
| November 21 | UMass | 2–1 | Evansville | Amherst, MA |
| 1:00 p.m. EST | 21' Alec Hughes; 60' Andrew Ortiz | Report | UMass Team 71' (o.g.); Jose Vivas (yellow card) 81' | Stadium: Rudd Field (UMass); Attendance: 219; Referee: Thomas Snyder; Assistant referees: Gurhan Dolgun; Jessica Carnevale; Fourth official: Narciso Fernandes |

| November 21 | West Virginia | 2–1 | North Florida | Morgantown, WV |
| 5:00 p.m. EST | 27' Sergio Ors Navarro; 79' Marcus Caldeira | Report | Nick Kishchenko (yellow card) 41'; Rafa Rios (yellow card) 42'; David Perez (yellow card) 84'; Jaxon Reinhardt 86'; Alex Barnett (yellow card) 90' | Stadium: Dick Dlesk Soccer Stadium; Attendance: 712; Referee: Cedrick Cook; Assistant referees: Jason Blight; Taylor Bombalski; Fourth official: Alexander Parent |

| November 21 | Akron | 1–0 | Princeton | Akron, OH |
| 6:00 p.m. EST | 55' Victor Gaulmin | Report | Jack Hunt (yellow card) 29'; Kristian Kelley (yellow card) 41' | Stadium: FirstEnergy Stadium; Attendance: 753; Referee: Youssef Elmessoussi; Assistant referees: Jake Brochu; William Gaither III; Fourth official: Ali Zolgharnain |

| November 21 | Oregon State | 0–1 | Gardner-Webb | Corvallis, OR |
| 10:00 p.m. EST | (yellow card) 81' Alejandro Silva | Report | Jesper Vikman (yellow card) 42'; Caio Hughes 72' | Stadium: Lorenz Field; Attendance: 568; Referee: Christopher Calderon; Assistant referees: Bryan Juarez; Alejandro Echeverri; Fourth official: Miles Crumley |

===== Second round =====
| November 24 | #14 Indiana | 2–1 (a.e.t.) | Akron | Bloomington, IN |
| 1:00 p.m. EST | Justin Weiss 71'; Jansen Miller 100' | Report | (yellow card) 20', (goal) 31' Dyson Clapier; (yellow card) 62' Ashton Kamdem; (yellow card) 67' Emil Jaaskelainen; (yellow card) 71' Connor Filsinger | Stadium: Bill Armstrong Stadium; Attendance: 1,669; Referee: Austin Saini; Assistant referees: Andrew Bigelow; Fernando Pina; Fourth official: Britton Maier |

| November 24 | #3 Denver | 3–0 | Gardner-Webb | Denver, CO |
| 3:00 p.m. EST | Ben Smith 19'; Keegan Kelly 24'; Trevor Wright 25'; Oje Ofunrein (yellow card) 39'; Jason Belloli (yellow card) 55' | Report | (yellow card) 33' Breno Correia; (yellow card) 56' Team; (yellow card) 84' Filipe Moreira | Stadium: CIBER Field; Attendance: 1,341; Referee: Mindi Lamboni; Assistant referees: Bradley Miller; Cuahutemoc Delgadillo; Fourth official: Max Alatorre |

| November 24 | #11 Virginia | 2–1 | West Virginia | Charlottesville, VA |
| 5:00 p.m. EST | Albin Gashi 6', (yellow card) 80'; AJ Smith 33'; Daniel Mangarov (yellow card) 86'; Joey Batrouni (yellow card) 90' | Report | 3' Marcus Caldeira; (yellow card) 34' Team; (yellow card) 80' Carlos Hernando | Stadium: Klöckner Stadium; Attendance: 1,747; Referee: David Erbacher; Assistant referees: Rick Rogers; Jeremy Smith; Fourth official: William Steffen |

| November 24 | #6 Penn | 0–1 | UMass | Philadelphia, PA |
| 5:00 p.m. EST | Mathis Varin (yellow card) 58' | Report | 47' Alec Hughes; (yellow card) 62' Andrew Ortiz | Stadium: Rhodes Field; Attendance: 1,000 |

===== Third round =====
| November 30 | #3 Denver | 1–0 | #14 Indiana | Denver, CO |
| 4:00 p.m. EST | Keegan Kelly 9' | Report | | Stadium: CIBER Field; Attendance: 1,875; Referee: Cristian Campo Hernandez; Assistant referees: Jarred Mosher; Bowen Taylor; Fourth official: Charles Rupert |

| November 30 | #11 Virginia | 0–1 | UMass | Charlottesville, VA |
| 5:00 p.m. EST | Umberto Pelà (yellow card) 61'; Daniel Mangarov (yellow card) 80'; Nick Dang (yellow card) 81' | Report | (yellow card) 31' Andrew Ortiz; 72' Virginia Own Goal; (yellow card) 81' Alec Hughes | Stadium: Klöckner Stadium; Attendance: 1,408; Referee: Lucas Feathers; Assistant referees: Jude Carr; Meghan Mullen; Fourth official: Richard Crowgey |

===== Quarterfinals =====
| December 7 | #3 Denver | 3–0 | UMass | Denver, CO |
| 1:00 p.m. MST | Jason Belloli 8'; Ronan Wynne 43'; Oje Ofunrein 50' | Report | (yellow card) 69' Alec Hughes; (yellow card) 72' Layton Purchase | Stadium: CIBER Field; Attendance: 2,361 |

Rankings shown are national seeds.

=== Pittsburgh Region 4 ===
First round November 21
Vermont* | 5
Iona | 0
San Diego* | 1
UC Davis* | 0
Saint Louis* | 0
Kansas City | 2
Cornell* | 4
Fordham | 2

Second round November 24
7 | Hofstra* | 1
Vermont | 2
San Diego | 1
10 | Duke* | 0
15 | Missouri State | 1
Kansas City | 2
Cornell | 0
2 | Pittsburgh | 1

Third round Nov 30 – Dec 1
Vermont | 1
San Diego* | 0
Kansas City | 2
2 | Pittsburgh* | 3

Quarterfinals; December 6–7
Vermont | 2
2 | Pittsburgh* | 0

*Host institution

==== Schedule ====
===== First round =====
| November 21 | Cornell | 4–2 | Fordham | Ithaca, NY |
| 2:00 p.m. EST (Note: Start time moved from 5:00 to 2:00 because of threat of snow in Ithaca.) | 50', 60' (pen.) Alex Harris; 74', 86' Alioune Ka; (yellow card) 80' (yellow-red card) 86' Danny Lokko | Report | 28' Louis Lehr; 32' Daniel D'ippolito; (yellow card) 81' Murat Calkap | Stadium: Charles F. Berman Field; Attendance: 475; Referee: Jan Halaska; Assistant referees: Jamel Ben Abdallah; Danielle Cornetta; Fourth official: Ankur Singh |

| November 21 | Vermont | 5–0 | Iona | Burlington, VT |
| 6:00 p.m. EST | 18' David Ismail; 46', 55' Yaniv Bazini; 70' Ryan Zellefrow; 85' Maximilian Kissel | Report | (yellow card) 42' Team | Stadium: Virtue Field; Attendance: 2,035; Referee: Fabio Cardoso; Assistant referees: Samuel Conroy; Larry Bechard; Fourth official: Jason Pelletier |

| November 21 | Saint Louis | 0–2 | Kansas City | St. Louis, MO |
| 8:00 p.m. EST | (yellow card) 14' Jackson Delkus; (yellow card) 77' Lawson Redmon; (yellow card) 86' Joey Maher | Report | 67', (yellow card) 87' Guille Munoz; 83' Jeremy Francou | Stadium: Hermann Stadium; Attendance: 1,051; Referee: Alex Beehler; Assistant referees: Sean West; Michael Heath; Fourth official: Dan Ortega |

| November 21 | San Diego | 1–0 | UC Davis | San Diego, CA |
| 10:00 p.m. EST | 36' Cesar Bahena | Report | | Stadium: Torero Stadium; Attendance: 1,679; Referee: Brandon Stevis; Assistant referees: Israel Fernandez; Emmanuel Padilla; Fourth official: William Delgado |

===== Second round =====
| November 24 | #10 Duke | 0–1 | San Diego | Durham, NC |
| 1:00 p.m. EST | Adam Luckhurst (yellow card) 76' | Report | (yellow card) 19' Vicente Ayala; (yellow card) 72' Mathias Bauer; 83' Jack Sandmeyer | Stadium: Koskinen Stadium; Attendance: 764; Referee: Michael Lavergne; Assistant referees: Sean Conlee; Kevin Maurer; Fourth official: Andrew Charron |

| November 24 | #2 Pittsburgh | 1–0 | Cornell | Pittsburgh, PA |
| 5:00 p.m. EST | Jackson Gilman (red card) 40'; Arnau Vilamitjana 45' (pen.) | Report | | Stadium: Ambrose Urbanic Field; Attendance: 1,115; Referee: Eric Tattersall; Assistant referees: James Duling; Adam Walters; Fourth official: Edward Boateng |

| November 24 | #7 Hofstra | 1–2 | Vermont | Hempstead, NY |
| 5:00 p.m. EST | Jacob Woznicki 52'; Team (yellow card) 85' (yellow-red card) 86'; Roc Carles (yellow card) 87' | Report | 8' Yaniv Bazini; (yellow card) 18' Adrian Schulze Solano; 53', (yellow card) 75' David Ismail | Stadium: Captain's Field; Attendance: 1,101; Referee: Carlos Fernandes; Assistant referees: Justen Lopez; Alex Rusu; Fourth official: Dave Breckner |

| November 24 | #15 Missouri State | 1–2 | Kansas City | Springfield, MO |
| 7:30 p.m. EST | Harry Jolley 32' | Report | 51' Sora Shibata; 72' Ales Kohoutek; (yellow card) 78' Mathias Baucher | Stadium: Allison South Stadium; Attendance: 757; Referee: Edvin Jurisevic; Assistant referees: Albert Franklin; Chris Thresher; Fourth official: Bryan Lemus |

===== Third round =====
| November 30 | #2 Pittsburgh | 3–2 (a.e.t.) | Kansas City | Pittsburgh, PA |
| 5:00 p.m. EST | Casper Grening 15'; Felipe Mercado (yellow card) 21'; Arnau Vilamitjana 70'; Albert Thorsen (yellow card) 93', 98' | Report | 6' Gabriele Galluccio; (yellow card) 70' Miguel Fernandez; 74' Guille Munoz; (yellow card) 81' Mateus Moura | Stadium: Ambrose Urbanic Field; Attendance: 768; Referee: Austin Saini; Assistant referees: Michael Nickerson; Jeffrey Skinker; Fourth official: Ryan Nee |

| November 30 | San Diego | 0–1 (a.e.t.) | Vermont | San Diego, CA |
| 8:00 p.m. EST | Owen Walz (yellow card) 37'; Luca Fava (yellow card) 84' | Report | 91' (pen.) Yaniv Bazini | Stadium: Torero Stadium; Attendance: 3,227; Referee: Servando Berna; Assistant referees: Abdel Hakeem Wakil; Adrian Gonzalez; Fourth official: Edwar Hernandez |

===== Quarterfinals =====
| December 7 | #2 Pittsburgh | 0–2 | Vermont | Pittsburgh, PA |
| 3:00 p.m. EST | | Report | 51' Maximilian Kissel; (yellow card) 61' Sydney Wathuta; 90' Yaniv Bazini | Stadium: Ambrose Urbanic Field; Attendance: 1,416; Referee: Nicholas Balcer; Assistant referees: Ben Pilgrim; Max Smith; Fourth official: Daniel Pop |

Rankings shown are national seeds.

=== 2024 Men's College Cup ===
Semifinals; December 13; WakeMed Soccer Park; Cary, NC
1 | Ohio State | 0
13 | Marshall | 1
3 | Denver | 1 (3)
Vermont | 1 (4)

Championship; December 16 @ 8:00pm EST; WakeMed Soccer Park; Cary, NC
13 | Marshall | 1
Vermont | 2

=== Men's College Cup semifinals ===
| December 13 College Cup Semifinals | #1 Ohio State | 0–1 | #13 Marshall | Cary, NC |
| 8:00 p.m. EST | Nick McHenry (yellow card) 33'; Marko Borkovic (yellow card) 71' | Report | 7' Tarik Pannholzer; (yellow card) 16' Aleksa Janjic; (yellow card) 88' Aymane Sordo | Stadium: WakeMed Soccer Park; Attendance: 10,614; Referee: Daniel Radford; Assistant referees: Adrian Gonzalez; Jarred Mosher; Fourth official: Khadime Sabara |

| December 13 College Cup Semifinal | #3 Denver | 1–1 (a.e.t.) (3–4 p) | Vermont | Cary, NC |
| 5:00 p.m. EST | Sam Bassett 69'; Ben Smith (yellow card) 80' | Report | (yellow card) 80' Nick Lockerman; 84' Yaniv Bazini; (yellow card) 99' Ryan Zellefrow | Stadium: WakeMed Soccer Park; Referee: Sorin Stoica; Assistant referees: Rick Rogers; Ryan Homik; Fourth official: Khadime Sabara |
| | Penalties |
| | Jake Smith (penalty scored); Ronan Wynne (penalty scored); Ben Smith (penalty missed); Sam Bassett (penalty scored); Trever Wright (penalty missed) | | (penalty scored) Yaniv Bazini; (penalty scored) Zach Barret; (penalty scored) Max Murray; (penalty scored) Maximilian Kissel |

=== Men's College Cup final ===
| December 16 College Cup National Championships | #13 Marshall | 1–2 (a.e.t.) | Vermont | Cary, NC |
| 8:00 p.m. EST | Theo Goddard (yellow card) 42'; Lineker Rodrigues dos Santos (yellow card) 48'; Tarik Pannholzer 67'; Thiago Apolinario (yellow card) 87' | Report | 81' Marcell Papp; 95' Maximillian Kissel | Stadium: WakeMed Soccer Park; Attendance: 6,057; Referee: Michael Lavergne; Assistant referees: Baboucarr Jallow; Carlos Morales-Lastra; Fourth official: Jude Carr |

=== College Cup all-tournament team ===
- Maximilian Kissel (O-MOP) – Vermont
- Niklas Herceg (D-MOP) – Vermont
- Yaniv Bazini – Vermont
- Zach Barrett – Vermont
- Marcell Papp – Vermont
- Tarik Pannholzer – Marshall
- Taimu Okiyoshi – Marshall
- Thomas Gilej – Ohio State
- Luciano Pechota – Ohio State
- Ben Smith – Denver
- Sam Bassett – Denver

== Records by conference ==
| Conference | Bids | Record | Pct. | R32 | S16 | E8 | F4 | CG | NC |
|---|---|---|---|---|---|---|---|---|---|
| Big East | 3 | 2–3–0 | .400 | 3 | – | – | – | – | – |
| Summit | 2 | 5–1–1 | .786 | 2 | 2 | 1 | 1 | – | – |
| Sun Belt | 2 | 5–2–0 | .714 | 2 | 1 | 1 | 1 | 1 | – |
| America East | 1 | 5–0–1 | .917 | 1 | 1 | 1 | 1 | 1 | 1 |
| Big South | 1 | 1–1–0 | .500 | 1 | – | – | – | – | – |
| ACC | 9 | 11–7–1 | .605 | 8 | 7 | 3 | – | – | – |
| Big Ten | 6 | 7–6–0 | .577 | 5 | 2 | 1 | 1 | – | – |
| Ivy | 3 | 1–3–0 | .250 | 2 | – | – | – | – | – |
| Missouri Valley | 3 | 1–3–0 | .250 | 2 | – | – | – | – | – |
| Big West | 2 | 1–1–1 | .500 | 1 | – | – | – | – | – |
| SoCon | 1 | 1–1–0 | .750 | 1 | – | – | – | – | – |
| West Coast | 2 | 2–2–0 | .500 | 1 | 1 | – | – | – | – |
| Atlantic 10 | 4 | 4–4–0 | .500 | 2 | 2 | 1 | – | – | – |
| CAA | 1 | 0–1–0 | .000 | 1 | – | – | – | – | – |
| Others | 8 | 0–7–1 | .063 | – | – | – | – | – | – |

- The R32, S16, E8, F4, CG, and NC columns indicate how many teams from each conference were in the Round of 32 (second round), Round of 16 (third round), Quarterfinals (Elite Eight), Semifinals (Final Four), Championship Game, and National Champion, respectively.
- The following conferences failed to place a team into the round of 32: American, ASUN, Horizon, MAAC, Northeast, Ohio Valley, Patriot, and WAC. The conference's records have been consolidated in the "Others" row.
- Matches concluded by a penalty shootout to determine advancement in the tournament following a drawn match are considered to be a tie for statistical purposes, except for the national championship game.

== Statistics ==
=== Goalscorers ===
There were 122 goals scored in 47 matches, for an average of 2.6 goals per match (as of December 16, 2024).

6 goals

- (Israel) Yaniv Bazini – Vermont

5 goals

- (Brazil) Lineker Rodrigues dos Santos – Marshall

3 goals

- (Germany) Tarik Pannholzer – Marshall
- (Nigeria) Michael Adedokun – Ohio State
- (Germany) Maximilian Kissel – Vermont

2 goals

- (Ghana) Wahabu Musah – Clemson
- (United States) Alex Harris – Cornell
- (United States) Alioune Ka – Cornell
- (United States) Ethan Sassine – Dayton
- (New Zealand) Keegan Kelly – Denver
- (Spain) Guille Munoz – Kansas City
- (United States) Alec Hughes – UMass
- (Australia) Max Rogers – Maryland
- (Saint Lucia) Donavan Phillip – NC State
- (Spain) Arnau Vilamitjana – Pittsburgh
- (United States) Milton Lopez – SMU
- (United States) Owen Zarnick – SMU
- (United States) Noah Adnan – Stanford
- (Germany) David Ismail – Vermont
- (United States) Dylan Borso – Wake Forest
- (Canada) Marcus Caldeira – West Virginia
- (United States) Greyson Mercer – Western Michigan
- (New Zealand) Owen Smith – Western Michigan

1 goal

- (United States) Dyson Clapier – Akron
- (France) Victor Gaulmin – Akron
- (United States) Zane Domsohn – Bucknell
- (The Gambia) Abubacarr Fofana – Charlotte
- (Ghana) Ransford Gyan – Clemson
- (Norway) Martin Bakken – Dayton
- (United States) Sam Bassett – Denver
- (United States) Jason Belloi – Denver
- (United States) Oje Ofunrein – Denver
- (United States) Ben Smith – Denver
- (United States) Trevor Wright – Denver
- (New Zealand) Ronan Wynne – Denver
- (United States) Daniel D'ippolito – Fordham
- (Germany) Louis Lehr – Fordham
- (Wales) Caio Hughes – Gardner-Webb
- (United States) Jacob Woznicki – Hofstra
- (United States) Jansen Miller – Indiana
- (United States) Justin Weiss – Indiana
- (France) Jeremy Francou – Kansas City
- (Italy) Gabriele Galluccio – Kansas City
- (Czech Republic) Ales Kohoutek – Kansas City
- (Japan) Sora Shibata – Kansas City
- (France) Stephane Njike – LIU
- (Senegal) Papa Sow – LIU
- (United States) Marco Silva – Marshall
- (Spain) Pablo Simon – Marshall
- (Japan) Haruhi Taneda – Marshall
- (Denmark) Luca Costabile – Maryland
- (Germany) Leon Koehl – Maryland
- (Uganda) Sadam Masereka – Maryland
- (Germany) Alex Nitzl – Maryland
- (United States) Andrew Ortiz – UMass
- (United States) Matthew Fisher – Michigan
- (United States) Duilio Herrera – Michigan
- (England) Harry Jolley – Missouri State
- (United States) Drew Lovelace – NC State
- (Canada) Nikola Markovic – NC State
- (South Africa) Vusumzi Plamana – NC State
- (United States) Jaxon Reinhardt – North Florida
- (Canada) David Ajagbe – Ohio State
- (Iceland) Siggi Magnusson – Ohio State
- (Denmark) Casper Grening – Pittsburgh
- (Norway) Albert Thorsen – Pittsburgh
- (United States) Aidan Davock – Providence
- (Brazil) Israel Dos Santos Neto – Providence
- (United States) Cesar Bahena – San Diego
- (United States) Jack Sandmeyer – San Diego
- (Germany) Kyran Chambron Pinho – SMU
- (Germany) Stephan Soghomonian – SMU
- (United States) Bailey Sparks – SMU
- (Denmark) Nicolas Hald Willumsen – UC Santa Barbara
- (United States) Zac Siebenlist – UC Santa Barbara
- (Japan) Haruki Utsumi – UC Santa Barbara
- (Russia) Pavel Dashin – SIUE
- (Hungary) Marcell Papp – Vermont
- (United States) Ryan Zellefrow – Vermont
- (Sweden) Albin Gashi – Virginia
- (Denmark) AJ Smith – Virginia
- (United States) Ryan Belal – Wake Forest
- (United States) Cooper Flax – Wake Forest
- (United States) Joe Dale – Washington
- (Spain) Sergio Ors Navarro – West Virginia
- (United States) Christian Shannon – Western Michigan
- (Portugal) Duarte Chapelas – Western Michigan

1 own goal

- Virginia (vs. UMass)
- UMass (vs. Evansville)

== See also ==
- 2024 NCAA Division I women's soccer tournament
