= Vermont Catamounts men's soccer =

American college soccer team

- Founded: 1964; 62 years ago
- University: University of Vermont
- Head coach: Adrian Dubois (2nd season)
- Conference: America East
- Location: Burlington, Vermont, US
- Stadium: Virtue Field (capacity: 2,600)
- Nickname: UVM, Catamounts
- Colors: Green and gold
| Home | Away |

NCAA tournament championships
- 2024

NCAA tournament College Cup
- 2024

NCAA tournament Quarterfinals
- 1989, 2022, 2024

NCAA tournament Round of 16
- 1989, 2022, 2023, 2024

NCAA tournament appearances
- 1975, 1977, 1978, 1981, 1989, 1990, 2000, 2007, 2015, 2016, 2021, 2022, 2023, 2024, 2025

Conference tournament championships
- 1965, 1966, 1967, 1968, 1969, 1971, 1975, 1989, 1990, 2000, 2007, 2015, 2021, 2024, 2025

Conference regular season championships
- 1989, 2012, 2017, 2019, 2024, 2025

The Vermont Catamounts men's soccer team represents the University of Vermont in all NCAA Division I men's college soccer competitions. The team competes in the America East Conference.

The team currently practices at Virtue Field adjacent to Centennial Field on campus.

== Roster ==
As of Jul 2026

Note: Flags indicate national team as defined under FIFA eligibility rules; some limited exceptions apply. Players may hold more than one non-FIFA nationality.

| No. | Pos. | Nation | Player |
|---|---|---|---|
| 0 | GK | USA | Jake Jacobi |
| 1 | GK | GER | Niklas Herceg |
| 2 | MF | USA | Gabriel Chavez |
| 3 | DF | USA | Omar Robbana |
| 5 | FW | USA | Gianluca Armellino |
| 6 | MF | USA | Connor Thompson |
| 7 | MF | USA | Andrew Millar |
| 8 | MF | GIB | Niels Hartman |
| 9 | FW | USA | Maximilian Kissel |
| 10 | DF | GER | Nick Lockermann |
| 11 | FW | USA | TJ Liquori |
| 12 | MF | USA | Nash Barlow |
| 13 | FW | GER | |
| 14 | MF | ESP | Marcos Blasco |
| 15 | DF | USA | Brady Costin |

| No. | Pos. | Nation | Player |
|---|---|---|---|
| 16 | MF | GER | Nico Loebus |
| 17 | DF | GER | Ioannis Vassiliou |
| 18 | FW | HUN | Marcell Papp |
| 19 | DF | USA | Toby Grant |
| 20 | MF | USA | Shalom Adja |
| 21 | DF | USA | Karl Daly |
| 22 | MF | USA | Gavin Stevenson |
| 24 | DF | USA | Pieter Bultman |
| 25 | DF | SWE | Ludvig af Ugglas |
| 26 | FW | BEL | Bruno Imarenakhue |
| 27 | MF | USA | Ryan Zellefrow |
| 28 | FW | GER | Philipp Kühn |
| 31 | MF | HKG | Jeremy Tsang |
| 35 | DF | JPN | Rui Aoki |
| 99 | GK | USA | Shane Williams |

== History ==
In 2024, the team won the 2024 NCAA Division I men's soccer tournament championship game, beating the Marshall Thundering Herd. This win is the first national championship by any America East Conference team in league history.

== Honours ==
=== National ===
| Championship | Titles | Year |
|---|---|---|
| NCAA tournament | 1 | 2024 |

=== Conference ===
| Conference | Championship | Titles | Winning years |
|---|---|---|---|
| Yankee | Regular season | 1 | 1965, 1966, 1967, 1968, 1969, 1971, 1975 |
| America East | Tournament | 8 | 1989, 1990, 2000, 2007, 2015, 2021, 2024, 2025 |
| America East | Regular season | 6 | 1989, 2012, 2017, 2019, 2024, 2025 |

== Year by year results ==
Note: Vermont competed in the Yankee Conference from 1964 to 1979 and has competed in the America East Conference since 1988.

| Season | Coach | Overall | Conference | Standing | Postseason |
|---|---|---|---|---|---|
Hal Greig (Yankee) (1964–1967)
| 1964 | Hal Greig | 3–4–0 | | | |
| 1965 | Hal Greig | 7–2–0 | | | |
| 1966 | Hal Greig | 9–2–0 | | | |
| 1967 | Hal Greig | 7–2–0 | | | |
Robert Stone (Yankee) (1968–1968)
| 1968 | Robert Stone | 6–3–0 | | | |
| Robert Stone: | | 6–3–0 | | | |
Hal Greig (Yankee) (1969–1969)
| 1969 | Hal Greig | 7–1–1 | | | |
| Hal Greig: | | 33–11–1 | | | |
Don Soderberg (Yankee) (1970–1974)
| 1970 | Don Soderberg | 1–3–6 | | | |
| 1971 | Don Soderberg | 10–2–0 | | | |
| 1972 | Don Soderberg | 2–10–1 | | | |
| 1973 | Don Soderberg | 5–8–0 | | | |
| 1974 | Don Soderberg | 7–3–3 | | | |
| Don Soderberg: | | 25–26–10 | | | |
Paul Reinhardt (Yankee) (1975–1984)
| 1975 | Paul Reinhardt | 11–3–0 | | | NCAA First Round |
| 1976 | Paul Reinhardt | 9–4–0 | | | |
| 1977 | Paul Reinhardt | 12–3–1 | | | NCAA First Round |
| 1978 | Paul Reinhardt | 8–5–3 | | | NCAA First Round |
| 1979 | Paul Reinhardt | 7–4–4 | | | |
| 1980 | Paul Reinhardt | 2–8–3 | | | |
| 1981 | Paul Reinhardt | 11–5–1 | | | NCAA Second Round |
| 1982 | Paul Reinhardt | 9–8–1 | | | |
| 1983 | Paul Reinhardt | 4–10–2 | | | |
| 1984 | Paul Reinhardt | 5–11–2 | | | |
| Paul Reinhardt: | | 78–61–17 | | | |
Ron McEachen (America East) (1985–1995)
| 1985 | Ron McEachen | 8–8–2 | | | |
| 1986 | Ron McEachen | 10–6–2 | | | |
| 1987 | Ron McEachen | 11–3–5 | | | |
| 1988 | Ron McEachen | 10–6–3 | 3–1–1 | 3rd | |
| 1989 | Ron McEachen | 19–3–1 | 4–0–1 | 1st | NCAA Elite Eight |
| 1990 | Ron McEachen | 12–6–4 | 3–1–1 | 2nd | NCAA First Round |
| 1991 | Ron McEachen | 10–8–2 | 4–3–0 | T-2nd | |
| 1992 | Ron McEachen | 8–9–3 | 4–2–1 | 3rd | |
| 1993 | Ron McEachen | 12–5–2 | 4–1–2 | 2nd | |
| 1994 | Ron McEachen | 9–9–1 | 3–4–0 | 5th | |
| 1995 | Ron McEachen | 5–13–2 | 1–7–1 | 8th | |
| Ron McEachen: | | 85–59–18 | 26–19–7 | | |
Roy Patton (America East) (1996–2003)
| 1996 | Roy Patton | 5–12–2 | 2–6–1 | 8th | |
| 1997 | Roy Patton | 12–5–2 | 6–2–1 | 3rd | |
| 1998 | Roy Patton | 9–8–1 | 3–5–1 | 8th | |
| 1999 | Roy Patton | 10–7–1 | 4–5–0 | T-6th | |
| 2000 | Roy Patton | 13–8–1 | 6–2–1 | T-2nd | NCAA First Round |
| 2001 | Roy Patton | 4–9–3 | 3–7–1 | T-9th | |
| 2002 | Roy Patton | 11–7–1 | 5–2–1 | 2nd | |
| 2003 | Roy Patton | 4–9–5 | 3–4–2 | 7th | |
| Roy Patton: | | 62–60–16 | 32–33–8 | | |
Jesse Cormier (America East) (2004–2016)
| 2004 | Jesse Cormier | 9–5–5 | 4–3–2 | T-4th | |
| 2005 | Jesse Cormier | 11–5–3 | 4–3–1 | 4th | |
| 2006 | Jesse Cormier | 9–7–4 | 5–1–2 | 2nd | |
| 2007 | Jesse Cormier | 9–10–3 | 4–2–2 | 2nd | NCAA Second Round |
| 2008 | Jesse Cormier | 9–4–7 | 4–1–3 | 3rd | |
| 2009 | Jesse Cormier | 1–10–5 | 1–5–2 | 7th | |
| 2010 | Jesse Cormier | 7–8–4 | 2–4–1 | 6th | |
| 2011 | Jesse Cormier | 9–7–1 | 4–2–1 | T-2nd | |
| 2012 | Jesse Cormier | 8–5–5 | 5–0–2 | 1st | |
| 2013 | Jesse Cormier | 9–5–4 | 3–3–1 | 4th | |
| 2014 | Jesse Cormier | 8–9–2 | 2–4–1 | 5th | |
| 2015 | Jesse Cormier | 11–7–3 | 3–2–2 | 2nd | NCAA First Round |
| 2016 | Jesse Cormier | 14–7–1 | 4–3–0 | 3rd | NCAA Second Round |
| Jesse Cormier: | | 114–89–47 | 45–33–20 | | |
Rob Dow (America East) (2017–2024)
| 2017 | Rob Dow | 10–8–1 | 5–1–1 | 1st | |
| 2018 | Rob Dow | 11–7–1 | 4–3 | T-3rd | |
| 2019 | Rob Dow | 11–6–1 | 5–1–1 | T-1st | |
| 2020 | Rob Dow | 5–2–1 | 4–1–1 | 2nd | |
| 2021 | Rob Dow | 11–4–2 | 6–1–1 | 2nd | NCAA First Round |
| 2022 | Rob Dow | 16–4–2 | 5–1–1 | 2nd | NCAA Quarterfinals |
| 2023 | Rob Dow | 13–6–2 | 4–3–0 | 4th | NCAA Third Round |
| 2024 | Rob Dow | 16–2–6 | 4–1–3 | T-1st | NCAA Champions |
| Rob Dow: | | 93–39–12 | 37–13–8 | | |
Adrian Dubois (America East) (2025–present)
| 2025 | Adrian Dubois | 14–1–5 | 6–0–1 | 1st | NCAA Second Round |
| Adrian Dubois: | | 14–1–5 | 6–0–1 | | |
| Total: | | 506–347–131 | | | |
National champion Postseason invitational champion Conference regular season champion Conference regular season and conference tournament champion Division regular season champion Division regular season and conference tournament champion Conference tournament champion

== See also ==
- Vermont Catamounts
- Vermont Catamounts women's soccer
- College soccer
