= Virtue Field =

Outdoor stadium in Burlington, Vermont

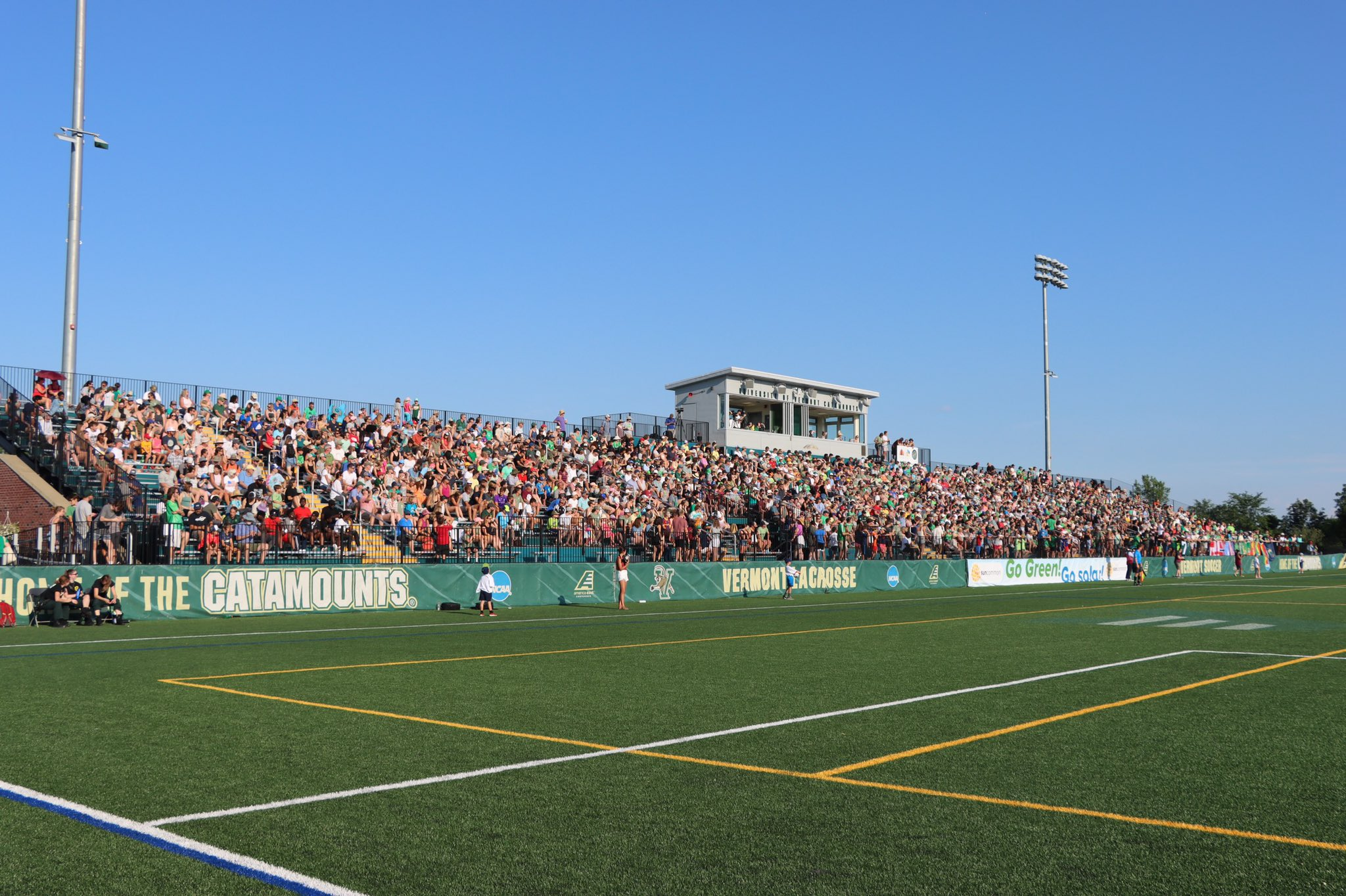
- The stadium hosting a Vermont Green FC game in 2022
- Interactive map of Virtue Field
- Full name: Virtue Field at Archie Post Athletic Complex
- Address: 97 Spear Street; Burlington; United States
- Owner: University of Vermont
- Operator: University of Vermont Athletics
- Capacity: 2500
- Surface: Artificial turf
- Scoreboard: Yes
- Record attendance: 2500

Construction
- Renovated: 2025

Tenants
- Vermont Catamounts (NCAA) teams: men's and women's soccer (2012–present); men's and women's lacrosse; Professional teams: Vermont Green FC (2022–present)

Website
- uvmathletics.com/virtuefield

Virtue Field is an on-campus stadium at the University of Vermont. It is home to the Vermont Catamounts men's and women's lacrosse teams, as well as the men's and women's soccer teams.

Since 2022, it has also served as the home field for USL League Two side Vermont Green FC.

The field is made of artificial turf.

== History ==
In 2015, lights were added for night competition.

Phase II of the Virtue Field project took place in the summer of 2016 with permanent seating for 2,600 spectators, a press box, and storage space were added.

Vermont played their first night game at Virtue Field on November 11, 2015, a 2–1 overtime win vs. UMBC.

Vermont Green FC won in their home opener, in front of a crowd of 1,001 people. On July 17, 2022 the club set a new attendance record when 2,500 people watched the Green defeat the Western Mass Pioneers 1–0. Green FC won their first USL League Two championship at the stadium on August 2, 2025.
