= 2024 North Carolina Tar Heels men's soccer team =

American college soccer season

2024 North Carolina Tar Heels men's soccer

NCAA Tournament, First Round
- Conference: Atlantic Coast Conference
- Record: 9–4–5 (4–3–1 ACC)
- Head coach: Carlos Somoano (14th season)
- Assistant coaches: Grant Porter (14th season); Michael Harrington (3rd season); Jeff Negalha (10th (1st of 2nd stint) season)
- Home stadium: Dorrance Field

2024 ACC men's soccer standings
| | Conf. | | | | | Overall |
| Team | W | | L | | T | W | | L | | T |
|---|---|---|---|---|---|---|---|---|---|---|
| No. 7 Pittsburgh + | 6 | – | 2 | – | 0 | 14 | – | 6 | – | 0 |
| No. 9 Clemson + | 5 | – | 2 | – | 1 | 15 | – | 3 | – | 4 |
| No. 15 Duke + | 4 | – | 1 | – | 3 | 11 | – | 4 | – | 4 |
| No. 6 Wake Forest ‡ | 4 | – | 2 | – | 2 | 12 | – | 5 | – | 7 |
| No. 5 SMU + | 4 | – | 2 | – | 2 | 12 | – | 3 | – | 6 |
| North Carolina + | 4 | – | 3 | – | 1 | 9 | – | 4 | – | 5 |
| No. 13 Stanford + | 3 | – | 2 | – | 3 | 9 | – | 5 | – | 6 |
| No. 17 Virginia + | 3 | – | 3 | – | 2 | 11 | – | 7 | – | 3 |
| No. 14 NC State + | 3 | – | 3 | – | 2 | 10 | – | 5 | – | 5 |
| Notre Dame | 3 | – | 3 | – | 2 | 7 | – | 5 | – | 5 |
| Syracuse | 2 | – | 4 | – | 2 | 7 | – | 7 | – | 3 |
| California | 2 | – | 4 | – | 2 | 8 | – | 8 | – | 2 |
| Boston College | 1 | – | 4 | – | 3 | 5 | – | 5 | – | 6 |
| Virginia Tech | 1 | – | 5 | – | 2 | 7 | – | 6 | – | 4 |
| Louisville | 0 | – | 5 | – | 3 | 6 | – | 7 | – | 4 |
‡ – ACC tournament champion + – At-large invitation to the 2024 NCAA tournament; As of December 17, 2024; Rankings from United Soccer Coaches; Source: The ACC

The 2024 North Carolina Tar Heels men's soccer team represented the University of North Carolina at Chapel Hill during the 2024 NCAA Division I men's soccer season. It was the 78th season of the university fielding a program. The Tar Heels were led by fourteenth-year head coach Carlos Somoano and played their home games at Dorrance Field in Chapel Hill, North Carolina.

The Tar Heels began the season ranked number six, and defeated UAB in their first game of the season. The followed that with a 0–0 draw against California Baptist. They fell to number seventeen in the rankings before winning two games to move back up to twelfth. A draw against St. John's saw the team rise back up to eleventh. They won their rivalry match against Duke to move up to sixth. A defeat of in-state foe and eighteenth ranked NC State saw them rise to third. While ranked third the Tar Heels went 1–1–1, defeating California, drawing Mercer, and losing to twenty-fourth ranked Clemson. They fell to number seven, where they spent four games. They defeated College of Charleston and William & Mary, drew Notre Dame, and lost to fourth ranked Pittsburgh to fall to number eleven. They defeated number seven Stanford to move back to eighth. They rounded out the regular season with a 0–1 loss to Boston College. They began the postseason at fourteenth in the rankings.

The Tar Heels finished the regular season 9–3–4 overall and 4–3–1 in ACC play to finish in sixth place. As the sixth overall seed in the ACC Tournament, they hosted eleventh seed California, in a regular season re-match, in the first round. California took revenge for the Tar Heels' regular season victory, and eliminated them from tournament contention with a 2–1 victory. North Carolina received an at-large bid to the NCAA Tournament, and were an unseeded team. They hosted Furman in the first round, and were eliminated in a penalty shoot-out to end their season. They finished the season with a 9–4–5 record.

== Background ==
The Tar Heels finished the season 11–4–7 overall and 2–3–3 in ACC play to finish in fourth place in the Coastal Division. As the seventh overall seed in the ACC Tournament, they defeated tenth seed Virginia Tech in the first round, upset second seed Wake Forest in the quarterfinals, and beat sixth seed Syracuse to reach the ACC final. There they faced off against Clemson and fell in a penalty shoot-out. They received an at-large bid to the NCAA Tournament and were the third overall seed. They defeated Memphis in the first round, and advanced in another penalty shoot-out over fourteenth seed Hofstra in the third round. They were unable to advance further, as they lost to Oregon State in the quarterfinals to end their season.

== Player movement ==
=== Departures ===
Departures
| Name | Number | Pos. | Height | Weight | Year | Hometown | Reason for departure |
|---|---|---|---|---|---|---|---|
| Til Zinnhardt | 2 | DF | 6'2" | 175 | Graduate student | Königstein, Germany | Graduated |
| Vemund Hole Vik | 4 | DF | 6'0" | 175 | Graduate student | Ålesund, Norway | Graduated |
| Quenzi Huerman | 11 | MF/FW | 6'0" | 172 | Graduate student | Vannes, France | Graduated |
| David Bercedo | 13 | FW | 5'8" | 148 | Graduate student | Madrid, Spain | Graduated |
| Jonathan Sinclair | 19 | DF/MF | 5'9" | 165 | Senior | Valley Stream, New York | Graduated |
| Ernest Bawa | 20 | MF/FW | 5'9" | 157 | Senior | Portor, Ghana | Graduated |
| Collin Travasos | 24 | GK | 6'3" | 195 | Graduate student | Encinitas, California | Graduated |
| Matthew Edwards | 26 | DF | 6'0" | 170 | Junior | Apex, North Carolina | Signed with Atlanta United FC |
| Yaya Bakayoko | 29 | MF | 5'9" | 158 | Senior | Bronx, New York | Graduated |
| Hayden Morgan | 39 | MF | 6'1" | 175 | Sophomore | Tampa, Florida | — |
| Daniel Kutsch | 42 | FW | 6'2" | 185 | Junior | Birmingham, Alabama | — |

=== Incoming transfers ===
Incoming transfers
| Name | Number | Pos. | Height | Weight | Year | Hometown | Previous school |
|---|---|---|---|---|---|---|---|
| Haruya Iwasaki | 4 | DF | 6'1" | 175 | Graduate student | Tokyo, Japan | CSU Bakersfield |
| Atthew Acosta | 5 | MF | 5'9" | 145 | Senior | Annandale, New Jersey | Rutgers |
| Luke Hille | 11 | FW | 6'1" | 170 | Senior | Cary, North Carolina | NC State |

=== Recruiting class ===
| Name | Nat. | Hometown | Club | TDS Rating |
|---|---|---|---|---|
| Michael Dunne; DF | USA | Pleasant Hill, Oregon | Portland Timbers Academy | 3/5 stars |
| Bertil Hansen; FW | DEN | Slagelse, Denmark | Næstved IF | N/A |
| Tate Johnson; DF | USA | Tampa, Florida | Tampa Bay Rowdies | 3/5 stars |
| Milton Jones; FW | USA | Glassboro, New Jersey | Berkshire School | 3/5 stars |
| Martin Mai; FW | DEN | Aarhus, Denmark | AGF | N/A |
| David Molina; MF | USA | Cary, North Carolina | North Carolina FC | 3/5 stars |
| Gavin Netzel; DF | USA | Saint Louis, Missouri | Saint Louis SC | 3/5 stars |
| Alejandro Saborio; GK | SUI | Geneva, Switzerland | Servette FC | N/A |
| Oscar Tonidandel; MF | USA | Clemmons, North Carolina | Charlotte FC | 3/5 stars |
| Luis Vera; MF | CRC | San José, Costa Rica | Blue Valley School | N/A |
| Hagen Waesch; MF | USA | The Colony, Texas | Dallas Texans Academy | 3/5 stars |
| Drew Waller; FW | USA | Concord, North Carolina | West Cabarrus | 3/5 stars |
| Ali Al-Qaq; FW | USA | Oak Ridge, North Carolina | Northwest Guilford | N/A |

== Squad ==
=== Roster ===
As of 12 Sep 2024

Note: Flags indicate national team as defined under FIFA eligibility rules; some limited exceptions apply. Players may hold more than one non-FIFA nationality.

| No. | Pos. | Nation | Player |
|---|---|---|---|
| 0 | GK | USA | Quinn Colsson |
| 1 | GK | USA | Andrew Cordes |
| 2 | DF | USA | Tate Johnson |
| 4 | DF | JPN | Haruya Iwasaki |
| 5 | DF | USA | Matthew Acosta |
| 6 | MF | USA | Andres Cardenas |
| 7 | MF | USA | Sam Williams |
| 8 | MF | USA | Jameson Charles |
| 9 | FW | SVK | Martin Vician |
| 10 | MF | ARG | Juan Caffaro |
| 11 | MF | FRA | Luke Hille |
| 12 | GK | HKG | Aristide Gry |
| 13 | FW | DEN | Bertil Hansen |
| 14 | MF | USA | John McDowell |
| 15 | DF | USA | Riley Thomas |
| 16 | MF | USA | Maclovio Swett |
| 17 | FW | USA | Daniel Lugo |
| 18 | DF | AUS | Charlie Harper |
| 19 | MF | USA | Gavin Netzel |
| 20 | MF | USA | Milton Jones |
| 21 | DF | USA | Parker O'Ferral |

| No. | Pos. | Nation | Player |
|---|---|---|---|
| 22 | FW | USA | Kai Tamashiro |
| 23 | FW | USA | Andrew Kitch |
| 24 | GK | SUI | Alejandro Saborio |
| 25 | MF | CRC | Luis Vera |
| 26 | MF | USA | Hagen Waesch |
| 27 | MF | USA | Andrew Czech |
| 28 | DF | USA | Kevin Gorbell |
| 29 | MF | USA | Oscar Tonidandel |
| 30 | GK | USA | Gabe Velasco |
| 31 | DF | USA | Michael Melilli |
| 32 | MF | USA | Tate Lorentz |
| 33 | DF | USA | Riley Berge |
| 34 | MF | USA | Ahmad Al-Qaq |
| 35 | MF | USA | Ty Johnson |
| 36 | MF | USA | Drew Waller |
| 37 | FW | DEN | Martin Mai |
| 38 | FW | USA | Lucas Ross |
| 40 | MF | USA | David Molina |
| 44 | FW | USA | Ali Al-Qaq |
| 47 | DF | USA | Michael Dunne |

=== Team management ===
| Position | Staff |
|---|---|
| Athletic director | Bubba Cunningham |
| Head coach | Carlos Somoano |
| Assistant coach | Grant Porter |
| Assistant coach | Jeff Negalha |
| Assistant coach | Michael Harrington |
| Director of operations | Marco Genee |

== Schedule ==
| Date Time, TV | Rank^{#} | Opponent^{#} | Result | Record | Site (Attendance) City, State |
Exhibition
| August 10*; 7:00 p.m. | | Campbell | None reported | – | Dorrance Field; Chapel Hill, NC |
| August 16*; 7:00 p.m. | | at UNC Wilmington | None reported | – | UNCW Soccer Stadium; Wilmington, NC |
Regular season
| August 22*; 8:00 p.m., ESPN+ | No. 6 | at UAB | W 1–0 | 1–0–0 | PNC Field (421); Birmingham, AL |
| August 25*; 7:30 p.m., ACCNX | No. 6 | California Baptist | T 0–0 | 1–0–1 | Dorrance Field (3,501); Chapel Hill, NC |
| August 29*; 7:30 p.m., ACCNX | No. 17 | FIU; Carolina Nike Classic | W 3–1 | 2–0–1 | Dorrance Field (1,801); Chapel Hill, NC |
| September 2*; 7:30 p.m., ACCNX | No. 17 | East Tennessee State; Carolina Nike Classic | W 6–0 | 3–0–1 | Dorrance Field (1,001); Chapel Hill, NC |
| September 6*; 7:00 p.m., ACCNX | No. 12 | St. John's | T 2–2 | 3–0–2 | Dorrance Field (1,202); Chapel Hill, NC |
| September 13; 7:00 p.m., ACCNX | No. 11 | at Duke; Rivalry | W 2–1 | 4–0–2 (1–0–0) | Koskinen Stadium (4,000); Durham, NC |
| September 20; 7:00 p.m., ACCNX | No. 6 | No. 18 NC State | W 2–0 | 5–0–2 (2–0–0) | Dorrance Field (3,601); Chapel Hill, NC |
| September 24*; 7:00 p.m., ACCNX | No. 3 | Mercer | T 0–0 | 5–0–3 | Dorrance Field (601); Chapel Hill, NC |
| September 28; 7:00 p.m., ACCNX | No. 3 | California | W 2–1 | 6–0–3 (3–0–0) | Dorrance Field (1,810); Chapel Hill, NC |
| October 4; 7:00 p.m., ACCNX | No. 3 | at No. 24 Clemson | L 2–3 | 6–1–3 (3–1–0) | Riggs Field (4,095); Clemson, SC |
| October 8*; 7:00 p.m., ACCNX | No. 7 | College of Charleston | W 3–0 | 7–1–3 | Dorrance Field (601); Chapel Hill, NC |
| October 11; 7:00 p.m., ACCNX | No. 7 | at Notre Dame | T 1–1 | 7–1–4 (3–1–1) | Alumni Stadium (3,108); Notre Dame, IN |
| October 15*; 6:00 p.m., FloSports | No. 7 | at William & Mary | W 5–2 | 8–1–4 | Albert–Daly Field (1,008); Williamsburg, VA |
| October 19; 6:00 p.m., ACCNX | No. 7 | No. 4 Pittsburgh | L 1–2 | 8–2–4 (3–2–1) | Dorrance Field (2,125); Chapel Hill, NC |
| October 27; 8:00 p.m., ACCNX | No. 11 | at No. 7 Stanford | W 2–1 | 9–2–4 (4–2–1) | Cagan Stadium (1,984); Stanford, CA |
| November 1; 7:30 p.m., ACCN | No. 8 | Boston College | L 0–1 | 9–3–4 (4–3–1) | Dorrance Field (1,901); Chapel Hill, NC |
ACC Tournament
| November 6; 6:00 p.m., ACCNX | (6) No. 14 | (11) California; First Round | L 1–2 | 9–4–4 | Dorrance Field (801); Chapel Hill, NC |
NCAA Tournament
| November 21; 5:00 p.m., ESPN+ | No. 14 | Furman; First Round | T 0–0 (3–5 PKs) ^{2OT} | 9–4–5 | Dorrance Field (801); Chapel Hill, NC |
*Non-conference game. ^{#}Rankings from United Soccer Coaches. (#) Tournament seedings in parentheses. All times are in Eastern.

== Awards and honors ==
| Recipient | Award | Date | Ref. |
|---|---|---|---|
| Riley Thomas | Pre-Season All-ACC Team | August 14 | |
| Martin Vician | ACC Defensive Player of the Week – Week 4 | September 16 | |
| Riley Thomas | All-ACC First Team | November 13 | |
| Martin Vician | All-ACC Second Team | November 13 | |
| Sam Williams | All-ACC Third Team | November 13 | |
| Tate Johnson | All-Freshman Team | November 13 | |

== 2025 MLS Super Draft ==
| Player | Team | Round | Pick # | Position |
|---|---|---|---|---|
| (United States) Tate Johnson | Vancouver Whitecaps FC | 1 | 15 | DF |
| (Australia) Charlie Harper | Colorado Rapids | 2 | 38 | DF |
| (United States) Riley Thomas | Austin FC | 2 | 42 | DF |

== Rankings ==
Ranking movements Legend: ██ Increase in ranking ██ Decrease in ranking — = Not ranked RV = Received votes
| | Week | | | | | | | | | | | | | | | | |
| Poll | Pre | 1 | 2 | 3 | 4 | 5 | 6 | 7 | 8 | 9 | 10 | 11 | 12 | 13 | 14 | 15 | Final |
|---|---|---|---|---|---|---|---|---|---|---|---|---|---|---|---|---|---|
| United Soccer | 6 | 17 | 12 | 11 | 6 | 3 | 3 | 7 | 7 | 11 | 8 | 14 | Not released | | | | RV |
| TopDrawer Soccer | 7 | 14 | 13 | 18 | 13 | 5 | 9 | 12 | 12 | 14 | 9 | 14 | 19 | 21 | — | — | — |
