= 2024 Duke Blue Devils men's soccer team =

American college soccer season

2024 Duke Blue Devils men's soccer

NCAA Tournament, Second Round
- Conference: Atlantic Coast Conference
- U. Soc. Coaches poll: No. 15
- TopDrawerSoccer.com: No. 20
- Record: 11–4–4 (4–1–3 ACC)
- Head coach: John Kerr (17th season)
- Assistant coaches: Michael Brady (17th season); Kyle Johnston (1st season); Tristan Wierbonski (1st season)
- Home stadium: Koskinen Stadium

2024 ACC men's soccer standings
	Conf.					Overall
Team	W		L		T	W		L		T
No. 7 Pittsburgh +	6	–	2	–	0	14	–	6	–	0
No. 9 Clemson +	5	–	2	–	1	15	–	3	–	4
No. 15 Duke +	4	–	1	–	3	11	–	4	–	4
No. 6 Wake Forest ‡	4	–	2	–	2	12	–	5	–	7
No. 5 SMU +	4	–	2	–	2	12	–	3	–	6
North Carolina +	4	–	3	–	1	9	–	4	–	5
No. 13 Stanford +	3	–	2	–	3	9	–	5	–	6
No. 17 Virginia +	3	–	3	–	2	11	–	7	–	3
No. 14 NC State +	3	–	3	–	2	10	–	5	–	5
Notre Dame	3	–	3	–	2	7	–	5	–	5
Syracuse	2	–	4	–	2	7	–	7	–	3
California	2	–	4	–	2	8	–	8	–	2
Boston College	1	–	4	–	3	5	–	5	–	6
Virginia Tech	1	–	5	–	2	7	–	6	–	4
Louisville	0	–	5	–	3	6	–	7	–	4
‡ – ACC tournament champion + – At-large invitation to the 2024 NCAA tournament; As of December 17, 2024; Rankings from United Soccer Coaches; Source: The ACC

The 2024 Duke Blue Devils men's soccer team represented Duke University during the 2024 NCAA Division I men's soccer season. The Blue Devils were led by head coach John Kerr, in his seventeenth season. They played their home games at Koskinen Stadium in Durham, North Carolina. The team was founded in 1935 and played the 2024 season in the Atlantic Coast Conference.

The Blue Devils began the season ranked number twenty in the United Soccer Coaches poll. They opened the season with a trip to California where they drew with San Diego 2–2, and defeated UC San Diego 3–2. This saw them fall out of the rankings. They lost to Grand Canyon at a neutral site, before winning their first home match of the season 14–1 over Averett. They also won their ACC opener against Virginia. The game against Virginia was the beginning of a stretch of five straight ACC games for the Blue Devils. After Virginia, they lost to rival and eleventh ranked North Carolina 1–2. They returned to California, where they drew top ranked Stanford 2–2. They defeated NC State, and returned to the rankings at number eighteen to draw number sixteen SMU. Their stretch of conference games ended with a 2–1 defeat of Elon. A draw against Wake Forest on October 12, would be the last dropped points of the regular season for the Blue Devils. They were ranked eleventh when they defeated Howard, tenth when they defeated Queens and Virginia Tech, and they ascended to fifth and defeated Longwood and Notre Dame to wrap ACC play. They entered the post-season ranked second.

The Blue Devils finished the regular season 10–2–4 overall and 4–1–3 in ACC play to finish in third place. As the third overall seed in the ACC Tournament, they defeated First Round opponents fourteenth seed Virginia Tech in a regular season rematch. In the Quarterfinals they were upset by eleventh seed and ACC newcomer California 2–0. They received an at-large bid to the NCAA Tournament and were awarded the tenth overall seed. Being a seeded team, they received a bye into the Second Round where they were defeated in a regular season rematch with San Diego to end their season. The Blue Devils finished 11–4–4 overall.

== Background ==
The Blue Devils finished the season 11–4–3 overall and 4–3–1 in ACC play to finish in third place in the Coastal Division. As the fifth overall seed in the ACC Tournament, they defeated twelfth seed Boston College in the First Round before losing to eventual champions Clemson on penalties in the Quarterfinals. They received an at-large bid to the NCAA Tournament and were awarded the fifteenth overall seed. Being a seeded team, they received a bye into the Second Round where they were defeated by Western Michigan to end their season.

== Player movement ==
=== Players leaving ===
Departures
Name	Number	Pos.	Height	Weight	Year	Hometown	Reason for Departure
Jacob Hochstein	00	GK	5'10"	165	Graduate Student	Duxbury, Massachusetts	Graduated
Julian Eyestone	1	GK	6'6"	215	Freshman	Dallas, Texas	Signed for Brentford
Amir Daley	2	DF	5'8"	140	Senior	Elmont, New York	Graduated
Lewis McGarvey	4	DF	6'2"	170	Senior	Belfast, Northern Ireland	Graduated
Antino Lopez	5	DF	6'0"	170	Senior	Las Vegas, Nevada	Graduated; drafted 52nd overall in the 2024 MLS SuperDraft
Nick Pariano	10	MF	5'8"	145	Senior	Philadelphia, Pennsylvania	Graduated
Jai Bean	11	FW	6'0"	165	Junior	Hamilton, Bermuda	Signed with North Village Rams
Cameron Fisher	14	MF	6'0"	175	Graduate Student	Scottsdale, Arizona	Graduated
Krew Verratti	15	MF	5'11"	170	Senior	Cincinnati, Ohio	Graduated
Wayne Frederick	17	MF	6'0"	145	Sophomore	Cabin John, Maryland	Drafted 2nd overall in the 2024 MLS SuperDraft
Bryce Barnum	18	MF	5'9"	140	Sophomore	League City, Texas	Transferred to UC San Diego
Forster Ajago	21	FW	6'2"	178	Graduate Student	Navrongo, Ghana	Graduated
Miguel Ramirez	25	FW	5'9"	155	Senior	Lawrenceville, Georgia	Graduated
Fahmi Ibrahim	26	FW	6'0"	175	Graduate Student	Alameda, California	Graduated

=== Players arriving ===
==== Incoming transfers ====
Incoming transfers
Name	Number	Pos.	Height	Weight	Year	Hometown	Previous School
Ryan Gallagher	00	GK	6'1"	175	Graduate Student	Tampa, Florida	Wisconsin
Wessel Speel	1	GK	6'7"	200	Graduate Student	Utrecht, Netherlands	Hofstra
Trevor Burns	4	MF	5'8"	150	Graduate Student	Kansas City, Missouri	Georgetown
Colton Pleasants	11	MF	5'8"	145	Graduate Student	Raleigh, North Carolina	UNC Wilmington
Jack Zugay	15	MF	6'1"	160	Graduate Student	Ann Arbor, Michigan	Michigan State
Niclas Wittur	21	DF	6'1"	185	Graduate Student	Schildow, Germany	Wingate
Hudson Hazlewood	25	MF	5'11"	150	Graduate Student	Princeville, Illinois	Washington University
Adam Luckhurst	26	FW	6'0"	165	Graduate Student	Santa Barbara, California	South Carolina

==== Recruiting class ====
Name	Nat.	Hometown	Club	TDS Rating
Sol Arbib; FW	ENG	London, England	—	N/A
Adrian Byasiima; FW	USA	Nolensville, Tennessee	Tennessee Soccer Club	3/5 stars
Alex Hauschild; DF	USA	Greenwich, Connecticut	NYCFC Academy	4/5 stars
Jamie Kabuusu; MF	USA	Chestnut Hill, Massachusetts	New England Revolution Academy	3/5 stars
Julius Suber; MF	USA	Kirkland, Washington	O'Dea	3/5 stars

== Squad ==
=== Roster ===
As of September 8, 2025

Note: Flags indicate national team as defined under FIFA eligibility rules; some limited exceptions apply. Players may hold more than one non-FIFA nationality.

No.	Pos.	Nation	Player
00	GK	USA	Ryan Gallagher
0	GK	USA	Grant Farley
1	GK	NED	Wessel Speel
2	DF	USA	Jamie Kabussu
3	DF	USA	Kamran Acito
4	DF	USA	Trevor Burns
5	MF	USA	Alex Hauschild
6	MF	USA	Cameron Kerr
7	MF	USA	Felix Barajas
8	MF	NOR	Bull Jorgensen
9	FW	ISL	Ulfur Bjornsson
10	MF	USA	Drew Kerr
11	FW	BER	Colton Pleasants
12	MF	USA	Ruben Mesalles
13	FW	USA	Jose Ortega
15	MF	USA	Jack Zugay

No.	Pos.	Nation	Player
16	MF	USA	Luke Thomas
17	MF	USA	Adrian Byasiima
18	MF	USA	Julius Suber
19	DF	USA	Sintayehu Clements
20	MF	USA	Andrew Myerson
21	FW	GER	Niclas Wittur
22	MF	USA	Caleb Donaldson
23	MF	USA	Kenan Hot
24	DF	ISL	Axel Gudbjornsson
25	MF	USA	Hudson Hazlewood
26	FW	USA	Adam Luckhurst
28	MF	USA	Sebastian Docters
29	DF	USA	Nate Mulvaney
30	GK	USA	Nathan Gaviser
31	FW	ENG	Sol Arbib
32	MF	USA	Jackson Lagos

=== Team management ===
Position	Staff
Athletic Director	(United States) Nina King
Head coach	(United States) John Kerr
Associate head coach	(England) Michael Brady
Assistant Coach	(United States) Kyle Johnston
Volunteer assistant coach	(United States) Tristan Wierbonski

== Schedule ==
Date Time, TV	Rank^{#}	Opponent^{#}	Result	Record	Site (Attendance) City, State
Exhibition
August 10*; 5:00 p.m.	No. 20	Coastal Carolina	T 0–0	—	751 Practice Fields; Durham, NC
August 13*; 7:00 p.m.	No. 20	UNC Asheville	W 7–1	—	Koskinen Stadium; Durham, NC
August 16*; 7:00 p.m.	No. 20	No. 16 Georgetown	W 3–1	—	Koskinen Stadium; Durham, NC
Regular season
August 22*; 10:00 p.m., ESPN+	No. 20	at San Diego	T 2–2	0–0–1	Torero Stadium (376); San Diego, CA
August 25*; 9:00 p.m., ESPN+	No. 20	at UC San Diego	W 3–2	1–0–1	Triton Soccer Stadium (232); San Diego, CA
August 30*; 7:00 p.m., ACCNX		vs. Grand Canyon	L 2–3	1–1–1	WakeMed Soccer Park (117); Cary, NC
September 1*; 2:00 p.m., ACCNX		Averett	W 14–1	2–1–1	Koskinen Stadium (477); Durham, NC
September 6; 6:00 p.m., ACCN		at Virginia	W 1–0	3–1–1 (1–0–0)	Klöckner Stadium (2,725); Charlottesville, VA
September 13; 7:00 p.m., ACCNX		No. 11 North Carolina; Rivalry	L 1–2	3–2–1 (1–1–0)	Koskinen Stadium (4,000); Durham, NC
September 22; 9:30 p.m., ACCNX		at No. 1 Stanford	T 2–2	3–2–2 (1–1–1)	Cagan Stadium (2,268); Stanford, CA
September 27; 6:00 p.m., ACCNX		at NC State	W 2–1	4–2–2 (2–1–1)	Dail Soccer Field (3,081); Raleigh, NC
October 4; 7:00 p.m., ACCNX	No. 18	No. 16 SMU	T 2–2	4–2–3 (2–1–2)	Koskinen Stadium (734); Durham, NC
October 8*; 7:00 p.m., FloSports	No. 16	at Elon	W 2–1	5–2–3	Rudd Field (898); Elon, NC
October 12; 7:00 p.m., ACCNX	No. 16	Wake Forest	T 0–0	5–2–4 (2–1–3)	Koskinen Stadium (1,129); Durham, NC
October 16*; 7:00 p.m., ACCNX	No. 11	Howard	W 10–0	6–2–4	Koskinen Stadium (392); Durham, NC
October 22*; 7:00 p.m., ACCNX	No. 10	Queens	W 5–0	7–2–4	Koskinen Stadium (447); Durham, NC
October 25; 6:00 p.m., ACCNX	No. 10	at Virginia Tech	W 1–0	8–2–4 (3–1–3)	Thompson Field (1,564); Blacksburg, VA
October 29*; 7:00 p.m., ACCNX	No. 5	Longwood	W 4–1	9–2–4	Koskinen Stadium (271); Durham, NC
November 1; 7:00 p.m., ACCNX	No. 5	Notre Dame	W 4–0	10–2–4 (4–1–3)	Koskinen Stadium (1,089); Durham, NC
ACC Tournament
November 6; 7:00 p.m., ACCNX	(3) No. 2	(14) Virginia Tech; First Round	W 2–0	11–2–4	Koskinen Stadium (688); Durham, NC
November 10; 6:00 p.m., ACCN	(3) No. 2	(11) California; Quarterfinals	L 0–2	11–3–4	Koskinen Stadium (744); Durham, NC
NCAA Tournament
November 24; 1:00 p.m., ESPN+	(10) No. 2	No. 3 San Diego; Second Round	L 0–1	11–4–4	Koskinen Stadium (764); Durham, NC
*Non-conference game. ^{#}Rankings from United Soccer Coaches. (#) Tournament seedings in parentheses. All times are in Eastern.

== Awards and honors ==
Recipient	Award	Date	Ref.
Ruben Mesalles	Pre-Season All-ACC Team	August 14	
Ulfur Bjornsson	ACC Offensive Player of the Week – Week 1	August 27	
Wessel Speel	ACC Goalkeeper of the Year	November 13, 2024	
Ulfur Bjornsson	All-ACC First Team	November 13, 2024	
Wessel Speel	All-ACC First Team	November 13, 2024	
Adam Luckhurst	All-ACC Second Team	November 13, 2024	
Kamran Acito	All-ACC Third Team	November 13, 2024	
Kenan Hot	All-ACC Third Team	November 13, 2024	
Ruben Mesalles	All-ACC Third Team	November 13, 2024	
Jamie Kabuusu	ACC All-Freshman Team	November 13, 2024	

== Rankings ==
Ranking movements Legend: ██ Increase in ranking ██ Decrease in ranking — = Not ranked RV = Received votes
	Week																
Poll	Pre	1	2	3	4	5	6	7	8	9	10	11	12	13	14	15	Final
United Soccer	20	RV	—	—	—	—	18	16	11	10	5	2	Not released				15
TopDrawer Soccer	20	20	—	17	20	13	10	9	11	10	8	3	10	15	20	20	20
