= 2024 Notre Dame Fighting Irish men's soccer team =

American college soccer season

2024 Notre Dame Fighting Irish men's soccer
- Conference: Atlantic Coast Conference
- Record: 7–5–5 (3–3–2 ACC)
- Head coach: Chad Riley (7th season)
- Assistant coaches: Mike Graczyk (5th season); Jeff Rowland (4th season)
- Home stadium: Alumni Stadium

2024 ACC men's soccer standings
	Conf.					Overall
Team	W		L		T	W		L		T
No. 7 Pittsburgh +	6	–	2	–	0	14	–	6	–	0
No. 9 Clemson +	5	–	2	–	1	15	–	3	–	4
No. 15 Duke +	4	–	1	–	3	11	–	4	–	4
No. 6 Wake Forest ‡	4	–	2	–	2	12	–	5	–	7
No. 5 SMU +	4	–	2	–	2	12	–	3	–	6
North Carolina +	4	–	3	–	1	9	–	4	–	5
No. 13 Stanford +	3	–	2	–	3	9	–	5	–	6
No. 17 Virginia +	3	–	3	–	2	11	–	7	–	3
No. 14 NC State +	3	–	3	–	2	10	–	5	–	5
Notre Dame	3	–	3	–	2	7	–	5	–	5
Syracuse	2	–	4	–	2	7	–	7	–	3
California	2	–	4	–	2	8	–	8	–	2
Boston College	1	–	4	–	3	5	–	5	–	6
Virginia Tech	1	–	5	–	2	7	–	6	–	4
Louisville	0	–	5	–	3	6	–	7	–	4
‡ – ACC tournament champion + – At-large invitation to the 2024 NCAA tournament; As of December 17, 2024; Rankings from United Soccer Coaches; Source: The ACC

The 2024 Notre Dame Fighting Irish men's soccer team represented the University of Notre Dame during the 2024 NCAA Division I men's soccer season. It was the program's 47th season. It was the program's 12th season competing in the Atlantic Coast Conference. The Fighting Irish were by head coach Chad Riley, in his seventh year, and played their home games at Alumni Stadium in Notre Dame, Indiana.

The Fighting Irish began the season as runners up and ranked second in the nation. They got off to a slow start and fell out of the rankings after drawing Akron and Indiana in their first two games. After defeating 15th ranked Louisville, they returned to number twenty-three in the polls. Their stay wouldn't last long as they drew Duquesne and lost to number 3 Stanford before falling back out of the rankings. Their best portion of the season followed, as the won four straight games. The only game of note was a 2–1 victory over number 12, and last year's national champions Clemson. They followed this run with two losses and drew draws. The defeated UIC and California before losing their final regular season game of the season against number 5 Duke.

The Fighting Irish finished the regular season 7–4–5 and 3–3–2 in ACC play to finish in a three-way tie for eighth place. Notre Dame lost the tiebreaker and was the tenth seed in the ACC Tournament. They lost in the first round to seventh seed Stanford 2–3. They did not receive an at-large bid to the NCAA Tournament. They finished the season 7–5–5 overall.

== Background ==
The Fighting Irish finished the season at 13–3–6 overall and 6–0–2 in ACC play to finish in 1st place in the Coastal Division. As the first overall seed in the ACC Tournament, they were defeated by Louisville in the Quarterfinals by the score of 4–3. They reached the finals of the NCAA Tournament, where they lost to Clemson.

== Player movement ==
=== Players leaving ===
Departures
Name	Number	Pos.	Height	Weight	Year	Hometown	Reason for departure
Ethan O'Brien	7	MF	6'0"	170	Graduate Student	Dublin, Ireland	Graduated
Matthew Radivojsa	8	MF	5'10"	150	Senior	Oakville, Ontario	Graduated
Eno Nto	9	FW	5'11"	157	Junior	Derby, England	Signed with Derby U-21
Daniel Russo	11	FW	6'0"	165	Senior	Jackson, New Jersey	Graduated
Mo Williams	14	DF	6'2"	190	Graduate Student	West Orange, New Jersey	Graduated
Paddy Burns	15	DF	6'0"	175	Senior	Crumlin, Northern Ireland	Graduated
Alex Salvino	23	FW	6'3"	190	Senior	Western Springs, Illinois	Graduated
Bryan Dowd	31	GK	6'3"	175	Senior	Willow Springs, Illinois	Graduated, drafted 6th overall in the 2024 MLS SuperDraft
Lukas Kamrath	32	DF	6'4"	200	Freshman	Longboat Key, Florida	Transferred to High Point
Michael Pellegrino	33	MF	6'0"	175	Senior	Wenonah, New Jersey	Graduated

=== Players arriving ===
==== Incoming transfers ====
Incoming transfers
Name	Number	Pos.	Height	Weight	Year	Hometown	Previous school
Collin Travasos	99	GK	6'3"	195	Graduate Student	Encinitas, California	North Carolina

==== Recruiting class ====
Name	Nat.	Hometown	Club	TDS Rating
Jacob Bartlett; MF	USA	Overland Park, Kansas	Sporting Kansas City Academy	4/5 stars
Stephen Dunphy; FW	USA	Carlsbad, California	San Diego Surf	3/5 stars
Brady Hilden; MF	USA	Reno, Nevada	Shattuck St. Mary's	3/5 stars
Blake Kelly; GK	USA	Holt, Michigan	Real Salt Lake Academy	4/5 stars
William Schroeder; MF	USA	Inverness, Illinois	Sockers FC	3/5 stars
Ian Shaul; MF	USA	Saint Paul, Minnesota	Minnesota United FC Academy	4/5 stars

== Squad ==
=== Roster ===
As of September 12, 2024

Note: Flags indicate national team as defined under FIFA eligibility rules; some limited exceptions apply. Players may hold more than one non-FIFA nationality.

No.	Pos.	Nation	Player
0	GK	ITA	Simone Baravelli
1	GK	USA	Owen Cornell
2	DF	USA	Mitch Ferguson
3	DF	USA	Sean McDowd
4	DF	USA	Jack Ross
5	DF	USA	Kyle Genenbacher
6	MF	USA	Wyatt Lewis
7	FW	USA	Nate Zimmermann
8	MF	USA	Nico Bartlett
9	FW	USA	Wyatt Borso
10	FW	GHA	KK Baffour
11	FW	USA	Jack Flanagan
12	MF	GHA	Daniel Boateng
13	MF	USA	Bryce Boneau
14	MF	USA	Will Schroeder

No.	Pos.	Nation	Player
15	MF	USA	Ian Shaul
16	MF	USA	Jacob Bartlett
17	DF	USA	Mateo Acosta
18	DF	USA	Josh Ramsey
19	FW	USA	Michael Rossi
20	FW	USA	Brady Hilden
21	FW	USA	Matthew Roou
22	MF	USA	Nolan Spicer
23	FW	USA	Stevie Dunphy
24	MF	USA	Sebastian Green
28	MF	USA	Nicholas Legendre
29	DF	USA	Cleveland Sellers IV
30	GK	USA	Liam Egan
31	GK	USA	Blake Kelly
99	GK	USA	Collin Travasos

=== Team management ===
Position	Staff
Athletic Director	Pete Bevacqua
Head coach	Chad Riley
Assistant Coach	Mike Graczyk
Assistant Coach	Jeff Rowland
Director of Operations	Chris Rolfe

== Schedule ==
Date Time, TV	Rank^{#}	Opponent^{#}	Result	Record	Site City, State
Exhibition
August 10*; 8:00 p.m.	No. 2	No. 8 Marshall	None Reported	–	Alumni Stadium; Notre Dame, IN
August 14*; 7:00 p.m.	No. 2	at IU Indy	None Reported	–	Michael A. Carroll Stadium; Indianapolis, IN
August 17*; 8:00 p.m.	No. 2	Creighton	None Reported	–	Alumni Stadium; Notre Dame, IN
Regular Season
August 22*; 8:00 p.m.	No. 2	Akron	T 1–1	0–0–1	Alumni Stadium (607); Notre Dame, IN
August 29*; 8:00 p.m.		at Indiana; Rivalry	T 2–2	0–0–2	Bill Armstrong Stadium (4,573); Bloomington, IN
September 6; 7:00 p.m.		at No. 15 Louisville	W 2–1	1–0–2 (1–0–0)	Lynn Stadium (1,165); Louisville, KY
September 10*; 8:00 p.m.	No. 23	Duquesne	T 1–1	1–0–3	Alumni Stadium (306); Notre Dame, IN
September 14; 7:00 p.m.	No. 23	No. 3 Stanford	L 0–1	1–1–3 (1–1–0)	Alumni Stadium (1,172); Notre Dame, IN
September 20*; 7:00 p.m.		Chicago State	W 6–1	2–1–3	Alumni Stadium (1,233); Notre Dame, IN
September 24*; 7:00 p.m.		Detroit Mercy	W 3–1	3–1–3	Alumni Stadium (203); Notre Dame, IN
September 27; 7:00 p.m.		No. 12 Clemson	W 2–1	4–1–3 (2–1–0)	Alumni Stadium (2,820); Notre Dame, IN
October 1*; 7:00 p.m.		Trine	W 7–1	5–1–3	Alumni Stadium (254); Notre Dame, IN
October 5; 7:00 p.m.		at Syracuse	L 1–2	5–2–3 (2–2–0)	SU Soccer Stadium (1,701); Syracuse, NY
October 8*; 7:00 p.m.		Michigan	L 0–1	5–3–3	Alumni Stadium (1,089); Notre Dame, IN
October 11; 7:00 p.m.		No. 7 North Carolina	T 1–1	5–3–4 (2–2–1)	Alumni Stadium (3,108); Notre Dame, IN
October 19; 7:00 p.m.		Boston College	T 1–1	5–3–5 (2–2–2)	Alumni Stadium (828); Notre Dame, Indiana
October 22*; 7:00 p.m.		UIC	W 5–0	6–3–5	Alumni Stadium (304); Notre Dame, IN
October 27th 7:00 p.m.		at California	W 2–0	7–3–5 (3–2–2)	Edwards Stadium (1,587); Berkeley, CA
November 1; 7:00 p.m.		at No. 5 Duke	L 0–4	7–4–5 (3–3–2)	Koskinen Stadium (1,089); Durham, NC
ACC tournament
November 6*; 9:00 p.m.	(10)	at (7) Stanford	L 2–3	7–5–5	Cagan Stadium (768); Stanford, CA
*Non-conference game. ^{#}Rankings from United Soccer Coaches. (#) Tournament seedings in parentheses. All times are in Eastern.

== Rankings ==
Ranking movements Legend: ██ Increase in ranking ██ Decrease in ranking — = Not ranked RV = Received votes
	Week																
Poll	Pre	1	2	3	4	5	6	7	8	9	10	11	12	13	14	15	Final
United Soccer	2	RV	—	23	RV	—	RV	—	—	—	—	—	Not released				—
TopDrawer Soccer	2	8	7	8	17	17	5	13	17	—	—	—	—	—	—	—	—
