= 2024 Stanford Cardinal men's soccer team =

American college soccer season

2024 Stanford Cardinal men's soccer

NCAA Tournament, Third Round
- Conference: Atlantic Coast Conference
- U. Soc. Coaches poll: No. 13
- TopDrawerSoccer.com: No. 16
- Record: 9–5–6 (3–2–3 ACC)
- Head coach: Jeremy Gunn (13th season)
- Assistant coaches: Ben Moane (5th season); Jack Winter (2nd season); Kevin McCarthy (1st season)
- Home stadium: Cagan Stadium

2024 ACC men's soccer standings
	Conf.					Overall
Team	W		L		T	W		L		T
No. 7 Pittsburgh +	6	–	2	–	0	14	–	6	–	0
No. 9 Clemson +	5	–	2	–	1	15	–	3	–	4
No. 15 Duke +	4	–	1	–	3	11	–	4	–	4
No. 6 Wake Forest ‡	4	–	2	–	2	12	–	5	–	7
No. 5 SMU +	4	–	2	–	2	12	–	3	–	6
North Carolina +	4	–	3	–	1	9	–	4	–	5
No. 13 Stanford +	3	–	2	–	3	9	–	5	–	6
No. 17 Virginia +	3	–	3	–	2	11	–	7	–	3
No. 14 NC State +	3	–	3	–	2	10	–	5	–	5
Notre Dame	3	–	3	–	2	7	–	5	–	5
Syracuse	2	–	4	–	2	7	–	7	–	3
California	2	–	4	–	2	8	–	8	–	2
Boston College	1	–	4	–	3	5	–	5	–	6
Virginia Tech	1	–	5	–	2	7	–	6	–	4
Louisville	0	–	5	–	3	6	–	7	–	4
‡ – ACC tournament champion + – At-large invitation to the 2024 NCAA tournament; As of December 17, 2024; Rankings from United Soccer Coaches; Source: The ACC

The 2024 Stanford Cardinal men's soccer team represented the Stanford University during the 2024 NCAA Division I men's soccer season. The Cavaliers were led by head coach Jeremy Gunn, in his thirteenth season. They played their home games at Cagan Stadium in Stanford, California. This was the teams first season playing in the Atlantic Coast Conference.

The Cardinal began the season ranked fifth overall and defeated San Jose State. However, they followed that with a loss to Denver, which saw them fall to thirteenth in the rankings. After the defeat, the Cardinal went on a six-game winning streak. They defeated two ranked teams in this span, second ranked Clemson and twenty-third ranked Notre Dame. They rose from thirteenth to fifth, third, and then number one in the rankings. The streak was broken at home versus Duke with a 2–2 tie. They fell to second in the rankings where they defeated Virginia. This would be the team's final regular season win, as they went on a six game winless streak to round out the regular season. The streak consisted of three ties, included one against fifteenth ranked SMU. Two of the three losses were against ACC teams, eleventh ranked North Carolina and rival California. The streak saw them fall from second in the rankings, to fifth, to seventh, and finally two twenty second. The end-of-season loss to California saw them drop out of the rankings.

The Cavaliers finished the regular season 8–4–4 after starting 7–1–0. They finished 3–2–3 in ACC play to finish in a seventh place. As the seventh overall seed in the ACC Tournament they defeated tenth seed Notre Dame, in a regular season re-match, in the First Round. Their Quarterfinal matchup was a re-match with second seed Clemson, who Stanford defeated during the regular season. The Tigers avenged that regular season loss and advanced to the Semifinals, while the Cardinal were eliminated from tournament contention. The Cardinal received an at-large bid to the NCAA Tournament and they were the sixteenth overall seed. They earned a bye to the Second Round where they advanced over UC Santa Barbara in a penalty shoot-out 6–5. Their Third Round match against top seed Ohio State again went to penalties, but the Cardinal were defeated 2–4, ending their season. Their final overall record was 9–5–6. Their nine wins were their lowest since 2021, and only the third time that the team has finished with less than 10 wins under Jeremy Gunn.

== Background ==
The Cardinal finished the season 11–4–5 overall and 3–2–5 in Pac-12 play to finish in fourth place. The team received an at-large bid to the NCAA Tournament and they were the sixteenth overall seed. They defeated Missouri State in the Second Round and first seed Marshall before losing 2–0 to eventual champions and ninth seed Clemson in the Quarterfinals to end their season.

== Player movement ==
=== Players leaving ===
Departures
Name	Number	Pos.	Height	Weight	Year	Hometown	Reason for departure
Nolan Evers	5	DF	6'2"	175	(redshirt) Senior	Pasadena, California	Graduated
Mark Fisher	6	MF	5'11"	165	(redshirt) Senior	Grand Blanc, Michigan	Graduated
Layton Purchase	16	MF	6'1"	180	Senior	Denver, Colorado	Graduated
Connor Evans	17	MF	5'9"	155	(redshirt) Junior	Portland, Oregon	Graduated
Aiden Weaver	18	MF	5'7"	140	Senior	Elizabethtown, Pennsylvania	Graduated
Ryan Dunn	21	DF	5'11"	172	Senior	Huntersville, North Carolina	Graduated
Rafael Pfauser	24	DF	6'3"	175	Freshman	Munich, Germany	—
Eliot Jones	30	GK	6'2"	175	Senior	New Britain, Connecticut	Graduated
James Swomley	33	GK	6'6"	195	Graduate Student	Newton, Massachusetts	Graduated

=== Players arriving ===
==== Incoming transfers ====
Incoming transfers
Name	Number	Pos.	Height	Weight	Year	Hometown	Previous school
Nik White	24	DF	6'2"	185	Graduate Student	Port Moody, Canada	Harvard
Louis Sterobo	26	DF	6'2"	182	Graduate Student	Odense, Denmark	Saint Mary's

==== Recruiting class ====
Name	Nat.	Hometown	Club	TDS Rating
Alexander Chow; MF	USA	Palo Alto, California	San Jose Earthquakes	4/5 stars
Eric Frintu; FW	USA	Redmond, Washington	Crossfire Premier	3/5 stars
Joe Moyer; FW	USA	Yorba Linda, California	Strikers FC	3/5 stars
Jordan Victor; GK	USA	Sacramento, California	Sacramento Republic FC Academy	3/5 stars

== Squad ==
=== Roster ===
As of 25 Sep 2024

Note: Flags indicate national team as defined under FIFA eligibility rules; some limited exceptions apply. Players may hold more than one non-FIFA nationality.

No.	Pos.	Nation	Player
1	DF	USA	Rowan Schnebly
2	DF	USA	Noah Adnan
2	DF	USA	Palmer Bank
4	DF	USA	Conner Maurer
5	DF	USA	Dylan Hooper
6	MF	USA	Dylan Groeneveld
7	MF	USA	Fletcher Bank
8	MF	USA	Will Reilly
9	FW	USA	Jackson Kiil
10	MF	USA	Zach Bohane
11	FW	ENG	Alfonso Tenconi-Gradillas
13	FW	USA	Shane de Flores
15	MF	USA	Will Cleary
17	FW	JPN	Liam Doyle

No.	Pos.	Nation	Player
19	FW	USA	Duncan Jarvie
20	MF	USA	Alex Chow
22	DF	USA	Nico Rei McMillan
23	MF	GHA	Kwabena Kwakwa
24	DF	USA	Nik White
25	FW	USA	Joe Moyer
26	DF	DEN	Louis Sterobo
27	MF	USA	Trevor Islam
28	FW	USA	Erik Frintu
29	DF	USA	Takashi Sasaki
30	GK	USA	Jordan Victor
32	GK	USA	Jack Morris
33	GK	USA	Laszlo Bollyky

=== Team management ===
Name	Position	Seasons
Jeremy Gunn	Head coach	13th
Ben Moane	Assistant coach	5th
Jack Winter	Assistant coach	2nd
Kevin McCarthy	Assistant coach	1st

== Schedule ==
Date Time, TV	Rank^{#}	Opponent^{#}	Result	Record	Site (Attendance) City, State
Exhibition
August 9*	No. 5	San Francisco	T 0–0	–	Cagan Stadium (–); Stanford, CA
August 11*	No. 5	Sacramento State	W 2–0	–	Cagan Stadium (–); Stanford, CA
August 17*	No. 5	Cal Poly	W 2–0	–	Cagan Stadium (–); Stanford, CA
Regular Season
August 22*; 7:00 p.m., ACCNX	No. 5	San Jose State	W 2–1	1–0–0	Cagan Stadium (927); Stanford, CA
August 25*; 4:00 p.m., ACCNX	No. 5	Denver	L 0–1	1–1–0	Cagan Stadium (1,074); Stanford, CA
August 29*; 7:00 p.m., ACCNX	No. 13	Cal State Fullerton	W 5–0	2–1–0	Cagan Stadium (518); Stanford, CA
September 1*; 5:00 p.m., ACCNX	No. 13	Saint Mary's	W 4–1	3–1–0	Cagan Stadium (1,286); Stanford, CA
September 8; 4:00 p.m., ACCNX	No. 5	at No. 2 Clemson	W 3–2	4–1–0 (1–0–0)	Riggs Field (6,179); Clemson, SC
September 10*; 7:00 p.m., ACCNX	No. 3	UC Riverside	W 3–0	5–1–0	Cagan Stadium (752); Stanford, CA
September 14; 4:00 p.m., ACCNX	No. 3	at No. 23 Notre Dame	W 1–0	6–1–0 (2–0–0)	Alumni Stadium (1,172); Notre Dame, IN
September 18*; 7:00 p.m., ACCNX	No. 1	UC Davis	W 1–0	7–1–0	Cagan Stadium (967); Stanford, CA
September 22; 7:00 p.m., ACCNX	No. 1	Duke	T 2–2	7–1–1 (2–0–1)	Cagan Stadium (2,268); Stanford, CA
September 27; 4:30 p.m., ACCNX	No. 2	at Virginia	W 1–0	8–1–1 (3–0–1)	Klöckner Stadium (1,446); Charlottesville, VA
October 4; 6:30 p.m., ACCNX	No. 2	NC State	T 0–0	8–1–2 (3–0–2)	Cagan Stadium (1,576); Stanford, CA
October 11; 5:00 p.m., ACCN	No. 5	at No. 15 SMU	T 2–2	8–1–3 (3–0–3)	Washburne Stadium (1,512); Dallas, TX
October 17*; 7:00 p.m., ESPN+	No. 2	at San Francisco	L 0–2	8–2–3	Negoesco Stadium (1,500); San Francisco, CA
October 21*; 7:00 p.m., ACCNX	No. 2	Pacific	T 1–1	8–2–4	Cagan Stadium (1,566); Stanford, CA
October 27; 5:00 p.m., ACCNX	No. 7	No. 11 North Carolina	L 1–2	8–3–4 (3–1–3)	Cagan Stadium (1,984); Stanford, CA
November 1; 7:00 p.m., ACCNX	No. 22	California; Rivalry	L 0–1	8–4–4 (3–2–3)	Cagan Stadium (1,834); Stanford, CA
ACC tournament
November 8; 6:00 p.m., ACCNX	(7)	(10) Notre Dame; First Round	W 3–2	9–4–4	Cagan Stadium (768); Stanford, CA
November 10; 11:00 a.m., ACCN	(7)	at (2) No. 7 Clemson; Quarterfinals	L 0–1	9–5–4	Riggs Field (2,036); Clemson, SC
NCAA tournament
November 24; 5:00 p.m., ESPN+	(16)	UC Santa Barbara; Second Round	T 2–2 (6–5 PKs) ^{2OT}	9–5–5	Cagan Stadium (2,300); Stanford, CA
December 1; 2:00 p.m., ESPN+	(16)	at (1) No. 1 Ohio State; Third Round	T 0–0 (2–4 PKs) ^{2OT}	9–5–6	Jesse Owens Memorial Stadium (1,136); Columbus, OH
*Non-conference game. ^{#}Rankings from United Soccer Coaches. (#) Tournament seedings in parentheses. All times are in Pacific.

== Awards and honors ==
Recipient	Award	Date	Ref.
Zach Bohane	Pre-Season All-ACC Team	August 14	
Shane de Flores	ACC Offensive Player of the Week – Week 3	September 10	
Fletcher Bank	ACC Co-Offensive Player of the Week – Week 5	September 24	
Zach Bohane	All-ACC First Team	November 13	

== Rankings ==
Ranking movements Legend: ██ Increase in ranking ██ Decrease in ranking — = Not ranked RV = Received votes ( ) = First-place votes
	Week																
Poll	Pre	1	2	3	4	5	6	7	8	9	10	11	12	13	14	15	Final
United Soccer	5	13	5	3	1 (8)	2	2	5	2	7	22	RV	Not released				13
TopDrawer Soccer	4	6	3	3	2	2	2	4	3	4	13	—	—	—	16	16	16
