= 2024 NC State Wolfpack men's soccer team =

American college soccer season

2024 NC State Wolfpack men's soccer

NCAA Tournament, Third Round
- Conference: Atlantic Coast Conference
- U. Soc. Coaches poll: No. 14
- TopDrawerSoccer.com: No. 15
- Record: 10–5–5 (3–3–2 ACC)
- Head coach: Marc Hubbard (1st season)
- Assistant coaches: Jon Shaad (1st season); Joel Tyson (1st season); Jordan Valentine (1st season)
- Home stadium: Dail Soccer Field

2024 ACC men's soccer standings
	Conf.					Overall
Team	W		L		T	W		L		T
No. 7 Pittsburgh +	6	–	2	–	0	14	–	6	–	0
No. 9 Clemson +	5	–	2	–	1	15	–	3	–	4
No. 15 Duke +	4	–	1	–	3	11	–	4	–	4
No. 6 Wake Forest ‡	4	–	2	–	2	12	–	5	–	7
No. 5 SMU +	4	–	2	–	2	12	–	3	–	6
North Carolina +	4	–	3	–	1	9	–	4	–	5
No. 13 Stanford +	3	–	2	–	3	9	–	5	–	6
No. 17 Virginia +	3	–	3	–	2	11	–	7	–	3
No. 14 NC State +	3	–	3	–	2	10	–	5	–	5
Notre Dame	3	–	3	–	2	7	–	5	–	5
Syracuse	2	–	4	–	2	7	–	7	–	3
California	2	–	4	–	2	8	–	8	–	2
Boston College	1	–	4	–	3	5	–	5	–	6
Virginia Tech	1	–	5	–	2	7	–	6	–	4
Louisville	0	–	5	–	3	6	–	7	–	4
‡ – ACC tournament champion + – At-large invitation to the 2024 NCAA tournament; As of December 17, 2024; Rankings from United Soccer Coaches; Source: The ACC

The 2024 NC State Wolfpack men's soccer team represented North Carolina State University during the 2024 NCAA Division I men's soccer season. They were led by head coach Marc Hubbard, in his first season. They played their home games at Dail Soccer Field in Raleigh, North Carolina.

The Wolfpack began coach Hubbards tenusre with two straight wins before drawing James Madison away. They won their first ACC game of the season, 2–1 over California. They entered the ranking following the victory at number 24. Their first game ranked they defeated Winthrop 7–0 and drew Stetson. They moved up to number eighteen where they defeated UNC Wilmington before losing to rival and sixth ranked North Carolina. They lost a second straight ACC match against Duke and then drew second ranked Stanford away. The Stanford game started a run where NC State faced four straight ranked teams. They drew three and defeated number ten SMU. They finished the season against three unranked teams, winning twice and losing on the final day of the season to Wake Forest. They re-entered the rankings at number twenty-three on October 15. They ascended to number nineteen in the next week, and finished the regular season at number twelve. Following the loss they fell to number twenty one for the post-season.

The Wolfpack finished the ACC regular season with an 8–3–5 overall record and a 3–3–2 ACC record, to finish in a three-way tie for eighth place. They were the eighth overall seed in the ACC Tournament. They were defeated at home in the First Round by ninth seed Virginia, 2–1. They earned an at-large bid to the NCAA Tournament. They were an unseeded team in the Georgetown Region. They hosted Charlotte in the First Round, and emerged victorious in overtime 2–1. They advanced to face top seed in the region Georgetown, who they defeated 2–0. The Wolfpack's run ended in West Virginia against Marshall in the Third Round, as they lost 2–1. The Wolfpack finished the season 10–5–5 overall.

== Previous season ==
The Wolfpack finished the ACC season with a 6–9–3 overall record and a 1–5–2 ACC record. They were the eleventh overall seed in the ACC Tournament. They were defeated in the First Round by sixth seed Syracuse 5–0. They were not invited to the NCAA Tournament. After the season, the Wolfpack mutually parted ways with George Kiefer.

== Player movement ==
=== Players leaving ===
Players Leaving
Name	Number	Pos.	Height	Weight	Year	Hometown	Reason for departure
Lucas Hatsios	1	GK	6'2"	192	Junior	Charlotte, North Carolina	—
Emil Thyregod	3	DF	6'1"	183	Freshman	Silkeborg, Sweden	Transferred to College of Charleston
Kendall Edwards	6	DF	6'2"	196	Graduate Student	Lilburn, Georgia	Graduated
Luke Hille	9	FW	6'0"	170	Junior	Cary, North Carolina	Transferred to North Carolina
Yuta Toya	12	MF	5'8"	153	Freshman	Maebashi, Japan	Transferred to Seattle
Parker Underwood	16	MF	6'1"	172	Senior	Davidson, North Carolina	Graduated
Jeremiah Luoma	18	FW	5'10"	155	Graduate Student	Atlanta, Georgia	Graduated
Scotty Taylor	19	FW	6'0"	157	Graduate Student	Millburn, New Jersey	Graduated
Jonathan Cisneros	20	DF	5'9"	140	Sophomore	Raleigh, North Carolina	—
Cam Murray	24	DF	6'0"	168	Graduate Student	Perth, Australia	Graduated
Gabi Velez	25	DF	5'7"	145	Freshman	Weston, Florida	Transferred to UCF
Brendan Peeples	28	MF	5'9"	131	Sophomore	Raleigh, North Carolina	—
Ben Voase	29	GK	6'2"	192	Freshman	Scarborough, England	—
Lazaro Gonzalez	32	MF	5'7"	170	Freshman	Bailey, North Carolina	—
Andrew Fox	34	DF	6'1"	175	Freshman	Durham, North Carolina	—

=== Players arriving ===
==== Incoming transfers ====
Incoming Transfers
Name	Number	Pos.	Height	Weight	Year	Hometown	Previous school
Enzo Carvalho	0	GK	6'5"		Graduate Student	Florianópolis, Brazil	MidAmerica Nazarene
Logan Erb	1	GK	6'3"	200	Junior	Houston, Texas	San Diego State
Liam Bennett	3	DF	6'0"	175	Graduate Student	Concord, New Hampshire	New Hampshire
Santiago Hoyos López	9	FW	6'0"	176	Junior	Medellín, Colombia	Gardner–Webb
Taig Healy	12	MF	5'7"	145	Junior	South Hampton, New Hampshire	New Hampshire
Isaac Heffess	18	DF	5'11"	175	(redshirt) Sophomore	Brookline, Massachusetts	New Hampshire
Yves Tcheuyap	19	DF	5'9"	170	Senior	Oakville, Ontario	East Tennessee State
Eitan Rosen	21	MF	6'2"	180	Graduate Student	Toronto, Ontario	Boston University
Will Noecker	23	DF	6'1"	175	Graduate Student	Fairfax, Virginia	Binghamton
Adam Fam	24	MF	5'11"	170	Graduate Student	Cambridge, Massachusetts	Colgate

==== Recruiting class ====
Name	Nat.	Hometown	Club	TDS Rating
Nakai Antoine; DF	USA	Baldwin, New York	Blau Weiss Gottschee SC	N/A
Cristian Gallo; DF	USA	Fort Lauderdale, Florida	FC Dallas Academy	3/5 stars
Nikola Markovic; DF	CAN	Gatineau, Canada	CF Montreal	N/A

== Squad ==
=== Roster ===
As of 16 Sep 2024

Note: Flags indicate national team as defined under FIFA eligibility rules; some limited exceptions apply. Players may hold more than one non-FIFA nationality.

No.	Pos.	Nation	Player
0	GK	BRA	Enzo Carvalho
1	GK	USA	Logan Erb
2	FW	USA	Ervin Cruz
3	DF	USA	Liam Bennett
4	DF	GHA	Lawson Abass
5	MF	RSA	Vusumzi Plamana
6	DF	CAN	Nikola Markovic
7	DF	ENG	Jarvis Cleal
8	MF	USA	Will Buete
9	FW	COL	Santiago Hoyos López
10	FW	RSA	Junior Nare
11	FW	POR	Henrique Santos
12	MF	USA	Taig Healy
13	MF	RSA	Calem Tommy
14	FW	USA	Samuel Presser

No.	Pos.	Nation	Player
15	FW	USA	Aidan Payne
16	MF	USA	Dylan Mitchiner
17	MF	USA	Caden Tolentino
18	DF	USA	Isaac Heffess
19	DF	CAN	Yves Tcheuyap
21	MF	USA	Eitan Rosen
22	FW	USA	Drew Lovelace
23	DF	USA	Will Noecker
24	MF	USA	Adam Fam
26	GK	USA	Samuel Terranova
27	DF	USA	Nakai Antoine
28	DF	USA	Cristian Gallo
30	GK	USA	Maddux Francis
31	FW	USA	Hakim Karamoko
32	FW	LCA	Donavan Phillip

=== Team management ===
Position	Staff
Athletic Director	Boo Corrigan
Head coach	Marc Hubbard
Assistant Coach	Jon Shaad
Assistant Coach	Joel Tyson
Assistant Coach	Jordan Valentine

== Schedule ==
Date Time, TV	Rank^{#}	Opponent^{#}	Result	Record	Site (Attendance) City, State
Regular season
August 22*; 6:00 p.m., ACCNX		High Point	W 3–2	1–0–0	Dail Soccer Field (2,584); Raleigh, NC
August 25*; 4:00 p.m., ACCNX		Florida Gulf Coast	W 1–0	2–0–0	Dail Soccer Field (881); Raleigh, NC
August 31*; 7:00 p.m., ESPN+		at James Madison	T 2–2	2–0–1	Sentara Park (247); Harrisonburg, VA
September 6; 8:00 p.m., ACCN		California	W 2–1	3–0–1 (1–0–0)	Dail Soccer Field (1,876); Raleigh, NC
September 10*; 6:00 p.m., ACCNX	No. 24	Winthrop	W 7–0	4–0–1	Dail Soccer Field (383); Raleigh, NC
September 13*; 6:00 p.m., ACCNX	No. 24	Stetson	T 1–1	4–0–2	Dail Soccer Stadium (1,307); Raleigh, NC
September 17*; 6:00 p.m., ACCNX	No. 18	UNC Wilmington	W 4–1	5–0–2	Dail Soccer Field (457); Raleigh, NC
September 20; 7:00 p.m., ACCNX	No. 18	at No. 6 North Carolina; Rivalry	L 0–2	5–1–2 (1–1–0)	Dail Soccer Stadium (3,601); Raleigh, NC
September 27; 6:00 p.m., ACCNX		Duke	L 1–2	5–2–2 (1–2–0)	Dail Soccer Field (3,081); Raleigh, NC
October 4; 9:30 p.m., ACCNX		at No. 2 Stanford	T 0–0	5–2–3 (1–2–1)	Cagan Stadium (1,576); Stanford, CA
October 11; 6:00 p.m., ACCNX		at No. 24 Virginia Tech	T 0–0	5–2–4 (1–2–2)	Thompson Field (1,305); Blacksburg, VA
October 15*; 6:00 p.m., ACCNX	No. 23	No. 21 Hofstra	T 1–1	5–2–5	Dail Soccer Field (337); Raleigh, NC
October 19; 6:00 p.m., ACCNX	No. 23	No. 10 SMU	W 5–1	6–2–5 (2–2–2)	Dail Soccer Field (776); Raleigh, NC
October 23*; 5:00 p.m., ESPN+	No. 19	at William & Mary	W 4–2	7–2–5	Dail Soccer Field (857); Raleigh, NC
October 27; 6:00 p.m., ACCNX	No. 19	Louisville	W 1–0	8–2–5 (3–2–2)	Dail Soccer Field (734); Raleigh, NC
November 1; 7:00 p.m., ACCNX	No. 12	at Wake Forest	L 0–1	8–3–5 (3–3–2)	Spry Stadium (1,825); Winston-Salem, NC
ACC tournament
November 6*; 8:00 p.m., ACCN	(8) No. 21	(9) Virginia; First Round	L 1–2	8–4–5	Dail Soccer Field (1,464); Raleigh, NC
NCAA tournament
November 21*; 7:00 p.m., ESPN+	No. 21	Charlotte; First Round	W 2–1 ^{2OT}	9–4–5	Dail Soccer Field (1,154); Raleigh, NC
November 24*; 12:00 p.m., ESPN+	No. 21	at (4) No. 24 Georgetown; Second Round	W 2–0	10–4–5	Shaw Field (1,899); Washington, D.C.
November 30*; 2:00 p.m., ESPN+	No. 21	at (13) No. 8 Marshall; Third Round	L 1–2	10–5–5	Hoops Family Field (2,048); Huntington, WV
*Non-conference game. ^{#}Rankings from United Soccer Coaches. (#) Tournament seedings in parentheses. All times are in Eastern.

== Awards and honors ==
Recipient	Award	Date	Ref.
Hakim Karamoko	Pre-Season All-ACC Team	August 14	
Logan Erb	ACC Co-Defensive Player of the Week	October 8	
Taig Healy	All-ACC Second Team	November 13	
Hakim Karamoko	All-ACC Second Team	November 13	
Nikola Markovic	All-ACC Freshman Team	November 13	

== 2025 MLS Super Draft ==
Player	Team	Round	Pick #	Position
Hakim Karamoko	D.C. United	1	10	FW
Donavan Phillip	Colorado Rapids	3	62	FW

== Rankings ==
Ranking movements Legend: ██ Increase in ranking ██ Decrease in ranking — = Not ranked RV = Received votes
	Week																
Poll	Pre	1	2	3	4	5	6	7	8	9	10	11	12	13	14	15	Final
United Soccer	—	—	—	24	18	RV	—	RV	23	19	12	21	Not released				14
TopDrawer Soccer	—	—	—	—	—	—	—	—	—	25	23	24	—	—	14	15	15
