= 2024 ACC men's soccer tournament =

Soccer tournament

- Classification: Division I
- Teams: 15
- Matches: 14
- Attendance: 14,049
- First round site: Campus Sites
- Quarterfinals site: Campus Sites
- Semifinals site: WakeMed Soccer Park; Cary, North Carolina
- Finals site: WakeMed Soccer Park; Cary, North Carolina
- Champions: Wake Forest (4th title)
- Winning coach: Bobby Muuss (3rd title)
- MVP: Prince Amponsah (Wake Forest)
- Broadcast: ESPNU (Final), ACC Network

2024 ACC men's soccer standings
	Conf.					Overall
Team	W		L		T	W		L		T
No. 7 Pittsburgh +	6	–	2	–	0	14	–	6	–	0
No. 9 Clemson +	5	–	2	–	1	15	–	3	–	4
No. 15 Duke +	4	–	1	–	3	11	–	4	–	4
No. 6 Wake Forest ‡	4	–	2	–	2	12	–	5	–	7
No. 5 SMU +	4	–	2	–	2	12	–	3	–	6
North Carolina +	4	–	3	–	1	9	–	4	–	5
No. 13 Stanford +	3	–	2	–	3	9	–	5	–	6
No. 17 Virginia +	3	–	3	–	2	11	–	7	–	3
No. 14 NC State +	3	–	3	–	2	10	–	5	–	5
Notre Dame	3	–	3	–	2	7	–	5	–	5
Syracuse	2	–	4	–	2	7	–	7	–	3
California	2	–	4	–	2	8	–	8	–	2
Boston College	1	–	4	–	3	5	–	5	–	6
Virginia Tech	1	–	5	–	2	7	–	6	–	4
Louisville	0	–	5	–	3	6	–	7	–	4
‡ – ACC tournament champion + – At-large invitation to the 2024 NCAA tournament; As of December 17, 2024; Rankings from United Soccer Coaches; Source: The ACC

The 2024 ACC men's soccer tournament was the 38th edition of the ACC men's soccer tournament. The tournament decided the Atlantic Coast Conference champion and guaranteed representative into the 2024 NCAA Division I men's soccer tournament. The final was played at WakeMed Soccer Park in Cary, North Carolina.

Clemson are the defending tournament champions. Clemson was unable to defend their title. They reached the final but lost in a penalty shootout to Wake Forest. The title was Wake Forest's fourth overall, and third for head coach Bobby Muuss.

== Qualification ==
All fifteen teams in the Atlantic Coast Conference earned a berth into the ACC Tournament. The First Round and Quarterfinals are hosted by the higher seeds. Seeding was determined by regular season conference record. The seeding for the tournament was determined on the final day of conference play, November 1. A tiebreaker was required to determine the fourth and fifth seeds as SMU and Wake Forest both finished with identical 4–2–2 records during the regular season. SMU earned the fourth seed as a result of their 3–0 home victory over Wake Forest on October 25. There was a three-way tie between NC State, Notre Dame, and Virginia as the three teams finished with 3–3–2 records. Goal differential in conference games was used as the tiebreaker. NC State was the eighth seed based on a +2 goal differential; Virginia was the ninth seed based on a 0 (zero) goal differential; and Notre Dame was the tenth seed based on a -2 goal differential. A third tiebreaker was required between California and Syracuse as both teams finished with 2–4–2 records. The two teams did not play during the regular season, so goal differential was used as the tiebreaker. California earned the eleventh seed based on their -3 goal differential, while Syracuse was the twelfth seed based on a -8 goal differential

Seed	School	Conference Record	Points
1	Pittsburgh	6–2–0	18
2	Clemson	5–2–1	16
3	Duke	4–1–3	15
4	SMU	4–2–2	14
5	Wake Forest	4–2–2	14
6	North Carolina	4–3–1	13
7	Stanford	3–2–3	12
8	NC State	3–3–2	11
9	Virginia	3–3–2	11
10	Notre Dame	3–3–2	11
11	California	2–4–2	8
12	Syracuse	2–4–2	8
13	Boston College	1–4–3	6
14	Virginia Tech	1–5–2	5
15	Louisville	0–5–3	3

== Bracket ==
*Note: Home team listed first. Rankings shown are ACC Tournament Seeds.

First Round; November 6 ACCN & ACCNX
8	NC State	1
9	Virginia	2
4	SMU	1
13	Boston College	0
5	Wake Forest	2
12	Syracuse	1
3	Duke	2
14	Virginia Tech	0
6	North Carolina	1
11	California	2
7	Stanford	3
10	Notre Dame	2
2	Clemson	3
15	Louisville	1

Quarterfinals; November 10; ACCN
1	Pittsburgh	0
9	Virginia	2
4	SMU	2 (4)
5	Wake Forest (pen.)	2 (5)
3	Duke	0
11	California	2
7	Stanford	0
2	Clemson	1

Semifinals; November 14; ACCN
9	Virginia	1
5	Wake Forest	5
11	California	2
2	Clemson	3

Final; November 17; ESPNU
5	Wake Forest (pen.)	1 (7)
2	Clemson	1 (6)

== Matches ==
=== First round ===
November 6, 2024	#2 Clemson	3–1	#15 Louisville	Clemson, South Carolina
6:00 p.m. EST	Adam Lundegard (yellow card) 18'; Joran Gerbet 47' (pen.); Alex Meinhard 58'; Remi Okunlola 60'; Lucas Magnason (yellow card) 71'	Report	(yellow card) 25' Bilal Camara; (yellow card) 47' Mason Tatafu; 48' TJ Kahoalii; (yellow card) 62' Jack Lewis; (yellow card) 90' Luca Hollenstein	Stadium: Riggs Field; Attendance: 1,251; Referee: Richonne Clark; Assistant referees: Rick Rogers; Kevin Huet; Fourth official: Jason Kent

November 6, 2024	#6 North Carolina	1–2	#11 California	Chapel Hill, North Carolina
6:00 p.m. EST	Luke Hille 7'	Report	(yellow card) 25' Adrian Jacobs; 64' Malcolm Zalayet; 78' (pen.) Alfredo Ortiz; (yellow card) 84' Santiago Hopkins	Stadium: Dorrance Field; Attendance: 801; Referee: Dimitar Chavdarov; Assistant referees: David McPhun; Marcus Moss; Fourth official: John Matto

November 6, 2024	#3 Duke	2–0	#14 Virginia Tech	Durham, North Carolina
7:00 p.m. EST	Jamie Kabussu (yellow card) 39'; Colton Pleasants 65'; Ulfur Bjornsson 81'	Report	(yellow card) 39' Ian Marcano; (yellow card) 76' Oliver Roche; (yellow card) 84' Ethan Hackenberg	Stadium: Koskinen Stadium; Attendance: 688; Referee: Matthew Thompson; Assistant referees: Benjamin Wooten; Gabriel Rivera; Fourth official: Robert Dial

November 6, 2024	#5 Wake Forest	2–1	#12 Syracuse	Winston-Salem, North Carolina
7:00 p.m. EST	Travis Smith Jr. (yellow card) 34', (goal) 83'; Pariss Mitchell (yellow card) 60'; Basit Umar (yellow card) 61'; Cooper Flax 70' (pen.)	Report	16', (yellow card) 70' Gabe Threadgold; (yellow card) 28' Kristjan Fortier; (yellow card) 66' Michael Acquah; (yellow card) 81' Sam Layton; (yellow card) 82' Ben Rosenblatt	Stadium: Spry Stadium; Attendance: 975; Referee: John McCloskey; Assistant referees: Jude Carr; Justin Howard; Fourth official: Nicole Green

November 6, 2024	#4 SMU	1–0	#13 Boston College	Dallas, Texas
8:00 p.m. EST	Bailey Sparks 54'	Report	(yellow card) 60' Marci Killeen; (yellow card) 79' Marco Dos Santos; (yellow card) 82' Michael Asare	Stadium: Washburne Stadium; Attendance: 676; Referee: Kevin Maurer; Assistant referees: Jarrod Tackel; Josh Ell; Fourth official: Muhammad Kaleia

November 6, 2024	#8 NC State	1–2	#9 Virginia	Raleigh, North Carolina
8:00 p.m. EST	Taig Healy 36'; Isaac Heffess (yellow card) 50'; Henrique Santos (yellow card) 55'; Vusumzi Plamana (yellow card) 78'; Aidan Payne (yellow card) 83'; Dylan Mitchiner (yellow card) 85'	Report	(yellow card) 13' Joaquín Brizuela; (yellow card) 63' Umberto Pelà; (yellow card) 71' Nick Dang; 72' Triton Beauvois; 73' David Okorie; (yellow card) 85' Daniel Mangarov; (yellow card) 90' Tom Miles	Stadium: Dail Soccer Field; Attendance: 1,464; Referee: Daniel Radford; Assistant referees: Raymond Thomas; Kevin Uitto; Fourth official: John Rush

November 6, 2024	#7 Stanford	3–2	#10 Notre Dame	Stanford, California
9:00 p.m. EST	Dylan Hooper (yellow card) 30', (goal) 90'; Jackson Kiil 34'; Will Reilly 85'; Team (yellow card) 85', (yellow card) 90'; Rowan Schnebly (yellow card) 90'	Report	22' Matthew Roou; (yellow card) 77' Wyatt Lewis; 90' Mitch Ferguson	Stadium: Cagan Stadium; Attendance: 768; Referee: Sergio Gonzalez; Assistant referees: Brandon Chapman; Michael Gebresaille; Fourth official: Peter Hanson

=== Quarterfinals ===
November 10, 2024	#2 Clemson	1–0	#7 Stanford	Clemson, South Carolina
2:00 p.m. EST	Alex Meinhard (yellow card) 25', (goal) 61'	Report	(yellow card) 59' Zach Bohane; (yellow card) 68' Fletcher Bank	Stadium: Riggs Field; Attendance: 2,036; Referee: Mike Stutt; Assistant referees: Jude Carr; Kevin Uitto; Fourth official: Kyle Johnson

November 10, 2024	#4 SMU	2–2 (a.e.t.) (4–5 p)	#5 Wake Forest	Dallas, Texas
4:00 p.m. EST	Bailey Sparks 60'; Jaylinn Mitchell 67'	Report	78' Cooper Flax; 81' Ryan Belal; (yellow card) 102' Jose Perez	Stadium: Washburne Stadium; Attendance: 1,175; Referee: Nikola Aleksic; Assistant referees: Chris Gordon; Muhammad Kaleia; Fourth official: Troy Dodge
	Penalties
	Owen Zarnick (penalty missed); Nikola Djordjevic (penalty scored); Bailey Sparks (penalty scored); Kyran Chambron Pinho (penalty scored); Cesar Ruvalcaba (penalty scored); Lamar Bynum (penalty missed)		(penalty scored) Cooper Flax; (penalty scored) Ryan Belal; (penalty scored) Basit Umar; (penalty scored) Jose Perez; (penalty missed) Will Jackson; (penalty scored) Mason Sullivan

November 10, 2024	#3 Duke	0–2	#11 California	Durham, North Carolina
6:00 p.m. EST		Report	2' Duke Own Goal; 17' Arik Duncan; (yellow card) 60' Gaku Nishimura; (yellow card) 82' Nonso Adimabua	Stadium: Koskinen Stadium; Attendance: 744; Referee: Matthew Thompson; Assistant referees: Benjamin Wooten; Gabriel Rivera; Fourth official: Robert Dail

November 10, 2024	#1 Pittsburgh	0–2	#9 Virginia	Pittsburgh, Pennsylvania
8:00 p.m. EST		Report	68' Umberto Pelà; 69' AJ Smith; (yellow card) 79' Parker Sloan	Stadium: Ambrose Urbanic Field; Attendance: 987; Referee: JC Rivero; Assistant referees: Ankur Singh; Michael Gorsenger; Fourth official: Sergio Gonzalez

=== Semifinals ===
November 14, 2024	#5 Wake Forest	5–1	#9 Virginia	Cary, NC
5:30 p.m. EST	Julian Kennedy 18'; Basit Umar 24'; Cooper Flax 29' (pen.), 75' (pen.); Joel Torbic 52'; Nicolas Mancilla (yellow card) 76'	Report	55' Triton Beauvois; (yellow card) 64' Nick Dang; (yellow card) 69' Albin Gashi	Stadium: WakeMed Soccer Park; Referee: Lucas Feathers; Assistant referees: Kevin Uitto; Matthew Mercier; Fourth official: Kevin Maurer

November 14, 2024	#2 Clemson	3–2	#11 California	Cary, NC
8:00 p.m. EST	Tyler Trimnal 5'; Alex Meinhard 23'; Lucas Magnason (yellow card) 33'; Ransford Gyan 66'; Galen Flynn (yellow card) 86'	Report	(yellow card) 45' (yellow-red card) 75' Team; (yellow card) 50' Kieran Bracken Serra; 51' Malcolm Zalayet; 62' Adrian Jacobs; (yellow card) 75' Santiago Hopkins	Stadium: WakeMed Soccer Park; Attendance: 645; Referee: David Erbacher; Assistant referees: Rick Rogers; Sean West; Fourth official: Kevin Maurer

=== Final ===
November 17, 2024	#2 Clemson	1–1 (a.e.t.) (6–7 p)	#5 Wake Forest	Cary, NC
12:00 p.m. EST	Lukas Magnason 20'; Tyler Trimnal (yellow card) 75'	Report	(yellow card) 32' Basit Umar; 39', (yellow card) 77' Nico Rabiu	Stadium: WakeMed Soccer Park; Attendance: 1,839; Referee: Michael Lavergne; Assistant referees: Jude Carr; Kevin Huet; Fourth official: Brandon Marion
	Penalties
	Mason Jimenez (penalty scored); Ransford Gyan (penalty scored); Joran Gerbet (penalty scored); Titus Sandy Jr (penalty missed); Alex Meinhard (penalty scored); Mathieu Brick (penalty scored); Adam Lundegard (penalty scored); Samir Dishnica (penalty missed)		(penalty scored) Cooper Flax; (penalty scored) Mason Sullivan; (penalty scored) Ryan Belal; (penalty missed) Basit Umar; (penalty scored) Liam O'Gara; (penalty scored) Dylan Borso; (penalty scored) Pariss Mitchell; (penalty scored) Jose Perez

== Statistics ==
=== Goalscorers ===
There have been 43 goals scored in 14 matches, for an average of 3.07 goals per match (as of November 17, 2024).

4 goals

- (United States) Cooper Flax – Wake Forest

3 goals

- (Estonia) Alex Meinhard – Clemson

2 goals

- (United States) Triton Beauvois – Virginia
- (United States) Bailey Sparks – SMU
- (United States) Malcolm Zalayet – California

1 goal

- (United States) Ryan Belal – Wake Forest
- (Iceland) Ulfur Bjornsson – Duke
- (United States) Arik Duncan – California
- (United States) Mitch Ferguson – Notre Dame
- (Ghana) Ransford Gyan – Clemson
- (United States) Taig Healy – NC State
- (United States) Luke Hille – North Carolina
- (United States) Dylan Hooper – Stanford
- (United States) Adrian Jacobs – California
- (United States) TJ Kahoalii – Louisville
- (United States) Julian Kennedy – Wake Forest
- (United States) Jackson Kiil – Stanford
- (United States) Adam Lundegard – Clemson
- (Iceland) Lukas Magnason – Clemson
- (United States) Jaylinn Mitchell – SMU
- (United States) David Okorie – Virginia
- (United States) Remi Okunlola– Clemson
- (United States) Alfredo Ortiz – California
- (Italy) Umberto Pelà – Virginia
- (United States) Colton Pleasants – Duke
- (United States) Nico Rabiu – Wake Forest
- (United States) Will Reilly – Stanford
- (United States) Matthew Roou – Notre Dame
- (Denmark) AJ Smith – Virginia
- (United States) Travis Smith Jr. – Wake Forest
- (United States) Gabe Threadgold – Syracuse
- (United States) Joel Torbic – Wake Forest
- (United States) Tyler Trimnal– Clemson
- (Ghana) Basit Umar – Wake Forest

1 own goal

- Duke (vs. California)

== All-Tournament team ==
Player	Team
**2024 ACC Men's Soccer All-Tournament team**
Trace Alphin	Wake Forest
**Prince Amponsah**	Wake Forest
Bo Cummins	Wake Forest
Cooper Flax	Wake Forest
Joran Gerbet	Clemson
Adam Lundegard	Clemson
Alex Meinhard	Clemson
Alfredo Ortiz	California
Malcolm Zalayet	California
Nick Dang	Virginia
Paul Wiese	Virginia

MVP in Bold
