= 2024 Virginia Cavaliers men's soccer team =

American college soccer season

2024 Virginia Cavaliers men's soccer

NCAA Tournament, Third Round
- Conference: Atlantic Coast Conference
- U. Soc. Coaches poll: No. 17
- TopDrawerSoccer.com: No. 14
- Record: 11–7–3 (3–3–2 ACC)
- Head coach: George Gelnovatch (29th season)
- Assistant coaches: Matt Chulis (18th season); Adam Perron (5th season); Jermaine Birriel (2nd season)
- Home stadium: Klöckner Stadium

2024 ACC men's soccer standings
	Conf.					Overall
Team	W		L		T	W		L		T
No. 7 Pittsburgh +	6	–	2	–	0	14	–	6	–	0
No. 9 Clemson +	5	–	2	–	1	15	–	3	–	4
No. 15 Duke +	4	–	1	–	3	11	–	4	–	4
No. 6 Wake Forest ‡	4	–	2	–	2	12	–	5	–	7
No. 5 SMU +	4	–	2	–	2	12	–	3	–	6
North Carolina +	4	–	3	–	1	9	–	4	–	5
No. 13 Stanford +	3	–	2	–	3	9	–	5	–	6
No. 17 Virginia +	3	–	3	–	2	11	–	7	–	3
No. 14 NC State +	3	–	3	–	2	10	–	5	–	5
Notre Dame	3	–	3	–	2	7	–	5	–	5
Syracuse	2	–	4	–	2	7	–	7	–	3
California	2	–	4	–	2	8	–	8	–	2
Boston College	1	–	4	–	3	5	–	5	–	6
Virginia Tech	1	–	5	–	2	7	–	6	–	4
Louisville	0	–	5	–	3	6	–	7	–	4
‡ – ACC tournament champion + – At-large invitation to the 2024 NCAA tournament; As of December 17, 2024; Rankings from United Soccer Coaches; Source: The ACC

The 2024 Virginia Cavaliers men's soccer team represented the University of Virginia during the 2024 NCAA Division I men's soccer season. The Cavaliers were led by head coach George Gelnovatch, in his twenty-ninth season. They played their home games at Klöckner Stadium in Charlottesville, Virginia. This was the team's 84th season playing organized men's college soccer and their 73rd playing in the Atlantic Coast Conference.

The Cavailers began the season ranked thirteenth in the polls and started the season with a win over Rider. They followed that with a loss against Colgate which saw them fall out of the polls. They defeated Saint Joseph's before a rough patch of six games. Over the next six games the team went 0–3–3. Their losses were against conference opponents Duke and second ranked Stanford and non-conference opponent UNC Greensboro. They drew Maryland, Wake Forest, and California. After this stretch, the Cavalier's season turned 180 degrees. They won six of their next seven games. Their only loss was at fifth ranked Pittsburgh. During this stretch, they defeated number eight James Madison and number nineteen Virginia Tech in back-to-back matches.

The Cavaliers finished the regular season 8–5–3 after starting 2–4–3. They finished 3–3–2 in ACC play to finish in a three-way tie for eighth place. As the ninth overall seed in the ACC Tournament they defeated eighth seed NC State in the First Round. Their Quarterfinal matchup was a re-match with first seed Pittsburgh. The Cavaliers avenged a regular season loss and advanced to the Semifinals. There they were defeated 5–1 by Wake Forest. They received an at-large bid to the NCAA Tournament and they were the eleventh overall seed. They earned a bye to the Second Round where they defeated West Virginia 2–1. They were upset in the Third Round by UMass to end their season. Their final overall record was 11–7–3.

== Background ==
The Cavaliers finished the season 11–4–4 overall and 5–2–1 in ACC play to finish in second place in the Coastal Division. As the third overall seed in the ACC Tournament they earned a bye to the Quarterfinals where they were defeated by sixth seed Syracuse in penalties. They received an at-large bid to the NCAA Tournament and they were the seventh overall seed. They defeated FIU in the Second Round before losing 1–0 to Indiana in the Third Round to end their season.

== Player movement ==
=== Players leaving ===
Departures
Name	Number	Pos.	Height	Weight	Year	Hometown	Reason for Departure
Scott Williams	1	GK	6'3"	195	Junior	Cincinnati, Ohio	Transferred to New Hampshire
William Citron	2	DF	6'0"	185	Senior	Eastchester, New York	Graduated
Aidan O'Connor	5	DF	6'3"	215	Senior	Grand Rapids, Michigan	Graduated; selected 12th overall in the 2024 MLS SuperDraft
Leo Afonso	7	FW	5'11"	170	Senior	São Paulo, Brazil	Graduated; selected 32nd overall in the 2024 MLS SuperDraft
Stephen Annor	9	FW	6'0"	140	Freshman	Accra, Ghana	Selected 26th overall in the 2024 MLS SuperDraft
Axel Ahlander	10	MF	6'3"	190	Senior	Nøtterøy, Norway	Graduated
Mouhameth Thiam	11	MF	5'5"	142	Senior	Dakar, Senegal	Graduated
Elias Norris	21	FW	5'10"	155	Graduate Student	Bethesda, Maryland	Graduated
Michael Tsicoulias	22	FW	5'8"	150	Junior	Newton, Massachusetts	Transferred to New Hampshire
Jack Singer	27	MF	6'1"	175	Graduate Student	San Francisco, California	Graduated
Holden Brown	99	GK	6'4"	190	Senior	Zionsville, Indiana	Graduated

=== Players arriving ===
==== Incoming transfers ====
Incoming transfers
Name	Number	Pos.	Height	Weight	Year	Hometown	Previous School
Tom Miles	0	GK	6'1"	180	Graduate Student	London, England	Lubbock Christian
Nick Dang	2	DF	6'2"	180	Junior	Brentwood, Tennessee	Lipscomb
Hayes Wood	7	FW	6'2"	200	Graduate Student	Chattanooga, Tennessee	Lipscomb
AJ Smith	9	FW	6'4"	189	Sophomore	Høje-Taastrup, Denmark	Tyler Junior College
Willem Ebbinge	16	FW	6'1"	180	Graduate Student	Queenstown, New Zealand	Harvard
Luc Mikula	21	DF	6'2"	198	Senior	State College, Pennsylvania	Coastal Carolina
Drew Serafino	22	FW	5'8"	155	Junior	East Longmeadow, Massachusetts	Boston College
Cameron Yriondo	27	MF	6'3"	180	Sophomore	Sammamish, Washington	Seattle Pacific
Grant Howard	33	DF	5'10"	179	Junior	Atlanta, Georgia	Virginia Tech

==== Recruiting class ====
Name	Nat.	Hometown	Club	TDS Rating
Jed Akwaboah; DF	USA	Short Hills, New Jersey	Cedar Stars Bergen	3/5 stars
Joaquín Brizuela; FW	ARG	Mendoza, Argentina	Godoy Cruz	N/A
Luke Burns; MF	USA	Scottsdale, Arizona	Phoenix Rising FC	3/5 stars
Anthony Faupel; FW	USA	St. Louis, Missouri	St. Louis City 2	3/5 stars
Michael Howard; FW	USA	Apex, North Carolina	Atlanta United FC	3/5 stars
Bakary Kante; MF	USA	Overland Park, Kansas	Kansas Rush	3/5 stars
Alex Parvu; DF	USA	Cumberland, Rhode Island	New England Revolution Academy	3/5 stars
Spencer Sanderson; GK	USA	Austin, Texas	Austin FC	3/5 stars

== Squad ==
=== Roster ===
As of September 1, 2024

Note: Flags indicate national team as defined under FIFA eligibility rules; some limited exceptions apply. Players may hold more than one non-FIFA nationality.

No.	Pos.	Nation	Player
0	GK	ENG	Tom Miles
00	GK	USA	Caleb Tunks
1	GK	USA	Joey Batrouni
2	DF	USA	Nick Dang
3	MF	USA	Max Talley
4	DF	GER	Paul Wiese
5	DF	USA	Austin Rome
6	MF	ITA	Umberto Pelà
7	FW	USA	Hayes Wood
8	MF	USA	Brendan Lambe
9	FW	DEN	AJ Smith
10	MF	USA	Daniel Mangarov
11	FW	ARG	Joaquín Brizuela
12	MF	SWE	Albin Gashi
13	FW	USA	Cesar Cordova
15	FW	USA	Triton Beauvois
16	MF	NZL	Willem Ebbinge
17	DF	CAN	Victor Akoum
18	FW	USA	Kome Ubogu
19	DF	USA	Reese Miller
20	FW	USA	Ignacio Alem

No.	Pos.	Nation	Player
21	DF	USA	Luc Mikula
22	MF	USA	Drew Serafino
23	FW	USA	David Okorie
24	MF	USA	Garrett Socas
25	DF	USA	Donovan Maryat
26	MF	USA	Amari Salley
27	MF	USA	Cameron Yriondo
28	MF	USA	Matthew Thissell
29	DF	USA	Yassine Rhoumar
30	GK	USA	Colin Gallagher
31	MF	USA	Luke Burns
32	DF	USA	Parker Sloan
33	DF	USA	Grant Howard
34	MF	USA	Miguel Kobby Adoboe
36	FW	USA	Anthony Faupel
37	DF	USA	Alex Parvu
38	MF	USA	Baka Kante
39	DF	USA	Jed Akwaboah
46	DF	USA	Matthew Hunter
99	GK	USA	Spencer Sanderson

=== Team management ===
Position	Staff
Head coach	George Gelnovatch
Associate Head Coach	Matt Chulis
Associate Head Coach	Adam Perron
Assistant coach	Jermaine Birriel

== Schedule ==
Date Time, TV	Rank^{#}	Opponent^{#}	Result	Record	Site (Attendance) City, State
Regular Season
August 22*; 7:00 p.m., ACCNX	No. 13	Rider	W 3–0	1–0–0	Klöckner Stadium (1,142); Charlottesville, VA
August 25*; 7:00 p.m., ACCNX	No. 13	Colgate	L 0–1	1–1–0	Klöckner Stadium (1,380); Charlottesville, VA
August 29*; 3:00 p.m., ACCNX		Saint Joseph's	W 5–0	2–1–0	Klöckner Stadium (861); Charlottesville, VA
September 2*; 7:00 p.m., BTN		at Maryland	T 1–1	2–1–1	Ludwig Field (2,402); College Park, MD
September 6; 6:00 p.m., ACCN		Duke	L 0–1	2–2–1 (0–1–0)	Klöckner Stadium (2,725); Charlottesville, VA
September 13; 7:00 p.m., ACCNX		at Wake Forest	T 1–1	2–2–2 (0–1–1)	Spry Stadium (2,440); Winston-Salem, NC
September 21; 7:00 p.m., ACCNX		at California	T 1–1	2–2–3 (0–1–2)	Edwards Stadium (710); Berkeley, CA
September 27; 7:30 p.m., ACCN		at No. 2 Stanford	L 0–1	2–3–3 (0–2–2)	Cagan Stadium (1,446); Stanford, CA
October 1*; 1:00 p.m., ACCNX		UNC Greensboro	L 1–2	2–4–3	Klöckner Stadium (877); Charlottesville, VA
October 7; 7:00 p.m., ACCNX		No. 19 Virginia Tech; Rivalry	W 2–1	3–4–3 (1–2–2)	Klöckner Stadium (2,813); Charlottesville, VA
October 8*; 7:00 p.m., ACCNX		No. 8 James Madison	W 1–0	4–4–3	Klöckner Stadium (1,345); Charlottesville, VA
October 11; 7:00 p.m., ACCNX		at Boston College	W 1–0	5–4–3 (2–2–2)	Newton Soccer Complex (250); Chestnut Hill, MA
October 15*; 7:00 p.m., ACCNX		American	W 4–2	6–4–3	Klöckner Stadium (1,350); Charlottesville, VA
October 19; 7:00 p.m., ACCNX		Syracuse	W 3–0	7–4–3 (3–2–2)	Klöckner Stadium (2,202); Charlottesville, VA
October 25; 7:00 p.m., ACCNX		at No. 5 Pittsburgh	L 1–4	7–5–3 (3–3–2)	Ambrose Urbanic Field (1,601); Pittsburgh, PA
October 30*; 3:00 p.m., ACCNX		Mary Washington	W 4–2	8–5–3	Klöckner Stadium (1,160); Charlottesville, VA
ACC Tournament
November 6; 8:00 p.m., ACCN	(9)	(8) No. 21 NC State; First Round	W 1–2	9–5–3	Dail Soccer Field (1,464); Raleigh, North Carolina
November 10; 8:00 p.m., ACCN	(9)	(1) No. 9 Pittsburgh; Quarterfinals	W 2–0	10–5–3	Pittsburgh (987); Ambrose Urbanic Field
November 14; 5:30 p.m., ACCN	(9)	(5) Wake Forest; Semifinal	L 1–5	10–6–3	WakeMed Soccer Park (645); Cary, NC
NCAA Tournament
November 24; 5:00 p.m., ESPN+	(11)	West Virginia; Second Round	W 2–1	11–6–3	Klöckner Stadium (1,747); Charlottesville, VA
November 30; 5:00 p.m., ESPN+	(11)	UMass; Third Round	L 0–1	11–7–3	Klöckner Stadium (1,408); Charlottesville, VA
*Non-conference game. ^{#}Rankings from United Soccer Coaches. (#) Tournament seedings in parentheses. All times are in Eastern.

== Awards and honors ==
Recipient	Award	Date	Ref.
Paul Wise	Pre-Season All-ACC Team	August 14	
Joey Batrouni	ACC Co-Defensive Player of the Week – Week 7	October 8	
Nick Dang	All-ACC Second Team	November 13, 2024	
Nick Dang	All ACC-Tournament Team	November 17, 2024	
Paul Wise	All ACC-Tournament Team	November 17, 2024	

== 2025 MLS Super Draft ==
Player	Team	Round	Pick #	Position
(United States) Nick Dang	Real Salt Lake	2	49	DF
(Denmark) A. J. Smith	New York City FC	3	78	FW

== Rankings ==
Ranking movements Legend: ██ Increase in ranking ██ Decrease in ranking — = Not ranked RV = Received votes
	Week																
Poll	Pre	1	2	3	4	5	6	7	8	9	10	11	12	13	14	15	Final
United Soccer	13	—	—	—	—	—	—	—	—	RV	—	—	Not released				17
TopDrawer Soccer	8	20	17	—	—	—	—	—	—	—	—	—	20	—	12	14	14
