= 2024 SMU Mustangs men's soccer team =

American college soccer season

2024 SMU Mustangs men's soccer
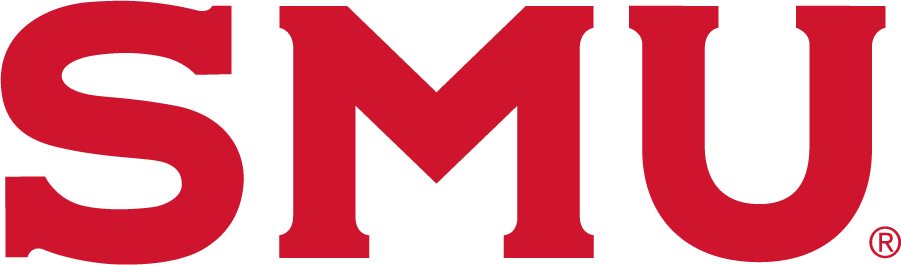

NCAA Tournament, Quarterfinals
- Conference: Atlantic Coast Conference
- U. Soc. Coaches poll: No. 5
- TopDrawerSoccer.com: No. 7
- Record: 12–3–6 (4–2–2 ACC)
- Head coach: Kevin Hudson (9th season)
- Assistant coaches: Michael King (4th season); Jamie Ibarra-Perez (1st season); Ross Fitzpatrick (1st season)
- Home stadium: Washburne Stadium

2024 ACC men's soccer standings
	Conf.					Overall
Team	W		L		T	W		L		T
No. 7 Pittsburgh +	6	–	2	–	0	14	–	6	–	0
No. 9 Clemson +	5	–	2	–	1	15	–	3	–	4
No. 15 Duke +	4	–	1	–	3	11	–	4	–	4
No. 6 Wake Forest ‡	4	–	2	–	2	12	–	5	–	7
No. 5 SMU +	4	–	2	–	2	12	–	3	–	6
North Carolina +	4	–	3	–	1	9	–	4	–	5
No. 13 Stanford +	3	–	2	–	3	9	–	5	–	6
No. 17 Virginia +	3	–	3	–	2	11	–	7	–	3
No. 14 NC State +	3	–	3	–	2	10	–	5	–	5
Notre Dame	3	–	3	–	2	7	–	5	–	5
Syracuse	2	–	4	–	2	7	–	7	–	3
California	2	–	4	–	2	8	–	8	–	2
Boston College	1	–	4	–	3	5	–	5	–	6
Virginia Tech	1	–	5	–	2	7	–	6	–	4
Louisville	0	–	5	–	3	6	–	7	–	4
‡ – ACC tournament champion + – At-large invitation to the 2024 NCAA tournament; As of December 17, 2024; Rankings from United Soccer Coaches; Source: The ACC

The 2024 SMU Mustangs men's soccer team represented the Southern Methodist University during the 2024 NCAA Division I men's soccer season. It was the 50th season of the university fielding a program, and their first season competing in the Atlantic Coast Conference. The Mustangs were led by ninth year head coach Kevin Hudson and played their home games at Washburne Stadium in Dallas, Texas.

The Mustangs started the season ranked tenth in the nation and defeated Air Force in their first game of the season. The followed that with a draw against Oral Roberts which saw them fall out of the rankings. A defeat of number six Saint Louis and a draw against number nine Denver saw them jump back into the rankings at number twenty two. They lost their ACC opening match against number eight Pittsburgh 3–1 to fall back out of the rankings. The Mustangs had three consecutive victories including ACC wins over California and number thirteen Virginia Tech to return to the rankings at number sixteen. The team drew three of their next four matches including draws against number eighteen Duke and number five Stanford. At the end of this run they were ranked tenth. A loss to twenty-third ranked NC State saw them drop to number twenty-one. They finished their season with ACC victories over Wake Forest and Louisville. They began the regular season at fifteenth in the rankings.

The Mustangs regular season 9–2–5 overall and 4–2–2 in ACC play to finish in a tie for fourth place. As the fourth overall seed in the ACC Tournament, they defeated thirteenth seed Boston College in the First Round. Their Quarterfinal match was a regular season rematch with Wake Forest, whom they tied with in the regular season standings. The two teams drew the match 2–2 and Wake Forest advanced via a penalty shoot-out 5–4. SMU received an at-large bid to the NCAA Tournament and were the twelfth overall seed. They defeated Washington in the Second Round 2–1 before traveling to fifth seed and fifth ranked Dayton in the Third Round. They won the match 3–1 to advance to the Quarterfinals where they faced thirteenth seed and eighth ranked Marshall. The Mustangs were defeated 3–2 to end their season. They finished the season with a 12–3–6 and were ranked fifth nationally.

== Background ==
The Mustangs finished the season 14–3–2 overall and 7–0–1 in AAC play to finish as regular season champions. As the first overall seed in the AAC Tournament, earned a bye into the Semifinals where they defeated Memphis 3–0. They fell in the Final to Charlotte 2–1. They received an at-large bid to the NCAA Tournament and were the sixth overall seed. They defeated Denver in the Second Round, before losing 7–1 to Oregon State in the Third Round to end their season.

== Player movement ==
=== Departures ===
Departures
Name	Number	Pos.	Height	Weight	Year	Hometown	Reason for Departure
Cole Johnson	1	GK	6'1"	175	Senior	Phoenix, Arizona	Graduated
Mads Westergren	4	DF	6'3"	184	Junior	Solrød Strand, Denmark	Drafted 73rd overall in the 2024 MLS SuperDraft
Oliver Hald	5	DF	6'2"	170	Junior	Copenhagen, Denmark	Signed with Greenville Triumph
Nathan Ashley	8	MF	5'9"	155	Senior	Johannesburg, South Africa	Graduated
Harvey Castro	11	MF	6'0"	160	Senior	Flower Mound, Texas	Graduated
JP Jordan	13	MF	5'10"	140	Junior	Keller, Texas	Transferred to Louisville
Alexander Petræus	16	FW	5'11"	177	Sophomore	Hvidovre, Denmark	Signed with Fremad Amager
Jose Ortiz	17	FW	5'10"	165	Senior	Arlington, Texas	Graduated
Jelldrik Dallmann	27	FW	6'4"	190	Graduate Student	Bremervörde, Germany	Graduated
Cody Black	28	MF	6'2"	175	Senior	San Diego, California	Graduated
Marcelo Guerra	29	GK	5'10"	160	Junior	Walnut Creek, California	Transferred to UC Santa Barbara
Logan Jones	33	MF	6'3"	165	Freshman	Roanoke, Texas	—

=== Incoming transfers ===
Incoming transfers
Name	Number	Pos.	Height	Weight	Year	Hometown	Previous School
Jordaine Jaeger	1	GK	6'2"	180	Junior	Munich, Germany	Saint Francis (PA)
Brock Pope	2	DF	6'1"	165	Graduate Student	Corinth, Texas	Bellarmine
Daniel Escorcia	21	MF	5'6"	141	Junior	Bogotá, Colombia	Dallas College Richland
Cameron Victor	29	GK	6'2"	198	Graduate Student	Port Clinton, Ohio	Wofford

=== Recruiting class ===
Name	Nat.	Hometown	Club	TDS Rating
Dominic Bartoni; FW	USA	St. Louis, Missouri	Christian Brother College	3/5 stars
Christian Chandler; MF	USA	San Antonio, Texas	San Antonio LEE	3/5 stars
Ryan Clanton-Pimentel; DF	USA	Leander, Texas	Lonestar SC	3/5 stars
Mason Grimm; DF	USA	Southlake, Texas	North Texas SC	4/5 stars
Charlie Isphording; DF	USA	Cincinnati, Ohio	Indian Hill Braves	3/5 stars
Oliver Knotek; FW	USA	Palos Verdes, California	Pateadores Soccer Club	3/5 stars
Hannes Ottoson; MF	SWE	Stockholm, Sweden	IFK Stocksund	N/A
Stephan Soghomonian; FW	USA	Santa Clarita, California	Fortuna Dusseldorf	3/5 stars
Yves Vaage; DF	NOR	Oslo, Norway	Strømsgodset Toppfotball	N/A

== Squad ==
=== Roster ===
As of 12 Sep 2024

Note: Flags indicate national team as defined under FIFA eligibility rules; some limited exceptions apply. Players may hold more than one non-FIFA nationality.

No.	Pos.	Nation	Player
1	GK	GER	Jordaine Jaeger
2	DF	USA	Brock Pope
3	DF	USA	Owen Zarnick
4	DF	USA	Cesar Ruvalcaba
5	DF	NOR	Yves Vaage
6	MF	ESP	Alex Salvo
7	DF	GER	Kyran Chambron
8	MF	ISR	Niv Berkovitz
10	FW	USA	Bailey Sparks
11	FW	SWE	Fredrik Skilberg
12	DF	USA	Lamar Bynum
13	MF	USA	Richard Garcia
14	DF	USA	Enzo Panozzo
15	DF	USA	Knobel Hunt
16	DF	USA	Mason Grimm
17	MF	USA	Jaylinn Mitchell
18	GK	USA	Martin Dominguez

No.	Pos.	Nation	Player
19	FW	USA	Milton Lopez
20	MF	USA	Nikola Djordjevic
21	MF	COL	Daniel Escorcia
22	MF	USA	Brendan Baird
23	DF	USA	Jeffrey Koch
24	FW	USA	Chris Deamon
25	MF	SWE	Hannes Ottoson
26	MF	USA	Ibrahim Keita
27	DF	USA	Ryan Clanton
28	FW	USA	Dominic Bartoni
29	GK	USA	Cameron Victor
30	FW	USA	Stephan Soghomonian
32	FW	USA	Oliver Knotek
33	DF	USA	Charlie Isphording
34	MF	USA	Christian Chandler
36	MF	USA	Noah Ervin
37	GK	USA	Chance Johnson

=== Team management ===
Position	Staff
Head coach	Kevin Hudson
Assistant Coach	Michael King
Assistant Coach	Jaime Ibarra-Perez
Assistant Coach	Ross Fitzpatrick

== Schedule ==
Date Time, TV	Rank^{#}	Opponent^{#}	Result	Record	Site (Attendance) City, State
Regular season
August 22*; 8:30 p.m., ACCNX	No. 10	Air Force	W 1–0	1–0–0	Washburne Stadium (1,761); Dallas, TX
August 25*; 6:00 p.m., ACCNX	No. 10	Oral Roberts	T 1–1	1–0–1	Washburne Stadium (1,358); Dallas, TX
August 29*; 8:30 p.m., ACCNX		No. 6 Saint Louis	W 1–0	2–0–1	Washburne Stadium (1,185); Dallas, TX
September 1*; 6:00 p.m., ACCNX		No. 9 Denver	T 2–2	2–0–2	Washburne Stadium (1,087); Dallas, TX
September 7; 7:00 p.m., ACCNX	No. 22	No. 8 Pittsburgh	L 1–3	2–1–2 (0–1–0)	Washburne Stadium (913); Dallas, TX
September 13; 6:00 p.m., ACCNX		at California	W 2–1	3–1–2 (1–1–0)	Washburne Stadium (429); Dallas, TX
September 16*; 7:00 p.m., ACCNX		Incarnate Word	W 2–0	4–1–2	Washburne Stadium (446); Dallas, TX
September 20; 7:00 p.m., ACCNX		No. 13 Virginia Tech	W 2–0	5–1–2 (2–1–0)	Washburne Stadium (627); Dallas, TX
September 25*; 7:00 p.m., ACCNX	No. 16	FIU	T 1–1	5–1–3	Washburne Stadium (432); Dallas, TX
September 29*; 7:00 p.m., ACCNX	No. 16	UTRGV	W 3–2	6–1–3	Washburne Stadium (602); Dallas, TX
October 4; 6:00 p.m., ACCN	No. 16	at No. 18 Duke	T 2–2	6–1–4 (2–1–1)	Koskinen Stadium (734); Durham, NC
October 11; 5:00 p.m., ACCN	No. 15	No. 5 Stanford	T 2–2	6–1–5 (2–1–2)	Washburne Stadium (1,512); Dallas, TX
October 15*; 7:00 p.m., ACCNX	No. 10	Central Arkansas	W 1–0	7–1–5	Washburne Stadium (356); Dallas, TX
October 19; 5:00 p.m., ACCNX	No. 10	at No. 23 NC State	L 1–5	7–2–5 (2–2–2)	Dail Soccer Field (776); Raleigh, NC
October 25; 5:00 p.m., ACCN	No. 21	Wake Forest	W 3–0	8–2–5 (3–2–2)	Washburne Stadium (1,283); Dallas, TX
November 1; 6:00 p.m., ACCNX	No. 20	at Louisville	W 3–2	9–2–5 (4–2–2)	Lynn Stadium (430); Louisville, KY
ACC Tournament
November 6; 7:00 p.m., ACCNX	(4) No. 15	(13) Boston College; First Round	W 1–0	10–2–5	Washburne Stadium (676); Dallas, TX
November 10; 3:00 p.m., ACCN	(4) No. 15	(5) Wake Forest; Quarterfinals	T 2–2 (4–5 PKs)	10–2–6	Washburne Stadium (1,175); Dallas, TX
NCAA Tournament
November 24; 6:00 p.m., ESPN+	(12) No. 15	Washington; Second Round	W 2–1	11–2–6	Washburne Stadium (1,876); Dallas, TX
November 30; 6:00 p.m., ESPN+	(12) No. 15	at (5) No. 5 Dayton; Third Round	W 3–1	12–2–6	Baujan Field (1,108); Dayton, OH
December 8; 2:00 p.m., ESPN+	(12) No. 15	(13) No. 8 Marshall; Quarterfinals	L 2–3	12–3–6	Washburne Stadium (1,635); Dallas, TX
*Non-conference game. ^{#}Rankings from United Soccer Coaches. (#) Tournament seedings in parentheses. All times are in Central.

== Awards and honors ==
Recipient	Award	Date	Ref.
Bailey Sparks	Pre-Season All-ACC Team	August 14	
Jaylinn Mitchell	ACC Offensive Player of the Week – Week 2	September 3	
Kyran Chambron Pinho	ACC Defensive Player of the Week – Week 5	September 24	
Kyran Chambron Pinho	ACC Co-Defensive Player of the Week – Week 10	October 29	
Bailey Sparks	All-ACC First Team	November 13	
Kyran Chambron Pinho	All-ACC Third Team	November 13	

== 2025 MLS Super Draft ==
Player	Team	Round	Pick #	Position
(United States) Nikola Djordjevic	Vancouver Whitecaps FC	2	45	DF
(United States) Cesar Ruvalcaba	Columbus Crew	2	51	DF
(United States) Bailey Sparks	Inter Miami CF	2	52	MF

== Rankings ==
Ranking movements Legend: ██ Increase in ranking ██ Decrease in ranking — = Not ranked RV = Received votes
	Week																
Poll	Pre	1	2	3	4	5	6	7	8	9	10	11	12	13	14	15	Final
United Soccer	10	—	22	RV	RV	16	16	15	10	21	20	15	Not released				5
TopDrawer Soccer	10	16	5	9	6	4	6	8	4	11	11	9	17	18	9	6	7
