= 2024 Pittsburgh Panthers men's soccer team =

American college soccer season

2024 Pittsburgh Panthers men's soccer

ACC Regular Season Champions

NCAA Tournament, Quarterfinals
- Conference: Atlantic Coast Conference
- U. Soc. Coaches poll: No. 7
- TopDrawerSoccer.com: No. 6
- Record: 14–6–0 (6–2–0 ACC)
- Head coach: Jay Vidovich (9th season)
- Assistant coaches: Bryce Cregan (3rd season); Josh Oldroyd (2nd season); Zack Schilawski (2nd season)
- Home stadium: Ambrose Urbanic Field

2024 ACC men's soccer standings
	Conf.					Overall
Team	W		L		T	W		L		T
No. 7 Pittsburgh +	6	–	2	–	0	14	–	6	–	0
No. 9 Clemson +	5	–	2	–	1	15	–	3	–	4
No. 15 Duke +	4	–	1	–	3	11	–	4	–	4
No. 6 Wake Forest ‡	4	–	2	–	2	12	–	5	–	7
No. 5 SMU +	4	–	2	–	2	12	–	3	–	6
North Carolina +	4	–	3	–	1	9	–	4	–	5
No. 13 Stanford +	3	–	2	–	3	9	–	5	–	6
No. 17 Virginia +	3	–	3	–	2	11	–	7	–	3
No. 14 NC State +	3	–	3	–	2	10	–	5	–	5
Notre Dame	3	–	3	–	2	7	–	5	–	5
Syracuse	2	–	4	–	2	7	–	7	–	3
California	2	–	4	–	2	8	–	8	–	2
Boston College	1	–	4	–	3	5	–	5	–	6
Virginia Tech	1	–	5	–	2	7	–	6	–	4
Louisville	0	–	5	–	3	6	–	7	–	4
‡ – ACC tournament champion + – At-large invitation to the 2024 NCAA tournament; As of December 17, 2024; Rankings from United Soccer Coaches; Source: The ACC

The 2024 Pittsburgh Panthers men's soccer team represented the University of Pittsburgh during the 2024 NCAA Division I men's soccer season. The Panthers were led by head coach Jay Vidovich, in his ninth season. They played their home games at Ambrose Urbanic Field. This was the team's 71st season playing organized men's college soccer and their 12th playing in the Atlantic Coast Conference.

The Panthers started the season with a defeat of number sixteen Georgetown and Mercyhurst. The two wins saw them go from unranked to third in the United Soccer Coaches poll. At number three, they defeated Penn State 2–1 before losing to Penn 1–0. This saw them fall to eighth for their first ACC match of the season. They defeated ACC newcomers and twenty second ranked SMU in Dallas 3–1. The Panthers followed this with a defeat of Louisville and ascended to second in the rankings. Another non-conference win, and a defeat of Boston College saw them rise to the top of the rankings. The Panthers collected two more ranked wins, defeating seventeenth ranked Virginia Tech and sixth ranked Denver before dropping two straight matches. They lost to ACC foe California and non-conference opponent High Point, both 1–0. The Panthers only fell to fourth, where they defeated seventh ranked North Carolina. The team went 1–1 to finish the season, defeating Virginia but losing on the final matchday of the season to Syracuse. They went into the postseason ranked ninth.

The Panthers finished the regular season 12–4–0 overall and 6–2–0 in ACC play to finish in first place, and win the ACC regular season championship. As the first overall seed in the ACC Tournament, they earned a bye into the Quarterfinals where they were defeated by Virginia in a rematch of the penultimate game of the regular season. They received an at-large bid to the NCAA Tournament and were the second overall seed. They earned a bye into the Second Round where they defeated Cornell 1–0. In the Third round, they dodged and upset bid from Kansas City, and won 3–2. They were defeated in the Quarterfinals by Vermont to end their season. The Panthers finished 14–6–0 overall.

== Background ==
The Panthers finished the season 6–7–4 overall and 2–3–3 in ACC play to finish in fifth place in the Coastal Division. As the eighth overall seed in the ACC Tournament, they were defeated by ninth seed Louisville in the First Round in overtime. They received an at-large bid to the NCAA Tournament and were an unseeded team. They lost in the First Round to James Madison to end their season.

== Player movement ==
=== Players leaving ===
Departures
Name	Number	Pos.	Height	Weight	Year	Hometown	Reason for departure
Kyle Durham	1	GK	6'3"	183	Freshman	Brooklyn, New York	Transferred to Connecticut
Raphael Cilli	3	DF	5'10"		Sophomore	Tourcoing, France	—
Fabian Grau	5	DF	6'2"	196	Graduate Student	Hamburg, Germany	Graduated
Abdoulaye Toure	7	FW	5'10"		Junior	Châtenay-Malabry, France	—
Joao Souza	11	MF	5'7"	152	Graduate Student	Cuiabá, Brazil	Graduated
Nick Blacklock	16	MF	5'11"	155	Graduate Student	Hellertown, Pennsylvania	Graduated
Ameer Abdullah	18	DF	6'2"	180	Freshman	Chicago, Illinois	Transferred to Loyola
Luka Kozomara	19	MF	6'3"	165	Junior	Cliffside Park, New Jersey	Transferred to California Baptist
Filip Mirkovic	21	MF	6'2"	150	Senior	Manhattan, New York	Graduated; Drafted 54th overall in the 2024 MLS SuperDraft
Abraham Brown	24	DF	6'1"	172	Sophomore	Los Angeles, California	Transferred to UC Irvine
Eli Mumford	31	GK	6'1"	167	Freshman	Chapel Hill, North Carolina	Transferred to Charlotte

=== Players arriving ===
==== Incoming transfers ====
Incoming transfers
Name	Number	Pos.	Height	Weight	Year	Hometown	Previous school
Logan Oliver	6	MF	5'11"	173	Sophomore	Baltimore, Maryland	Indiana
Casper Grening	11	MF	6'0"	187	Senior	Roskilde, Denmark	Kentucky
Arnau Vilamitjana	14	MF	6'2"	184	Graduate Student	Girona, Spain	FC Barcelona
Casper Svendby	21	DF	5'10"	175	Junior	Drammen, Norway	Dayton

==== Recruiting class ====
Name	Nat.	Hometown	Club	TDS Rating
Tim Baierlein; FW	GER	Amberg, Germany	SpVgg Greuther Fürth U19	N/A
Miguel Bertran; MF	ESP	Barcelona, Spain	Cf Damm	N/A
Owen Christopher; DF	USA	North Huntingdon, Pennsylvania	Beadling SC	3/5 stars
Lasse Dahl; FW	DEN	Vildbjerg, Denmark	Holstebro Boldklub	N/A
Mason Dancy; DF	USA	Leawood, Kansas	Sporting Kansas City Academy	3/5 stars
Daniel Gamboa Gonzalez; DF	ESP	Castellón de la Plana, Spain	CE Europa	N/A
Cooper Sisson; GK	USA	Irwin, Pennsylvania	BVB IA Pittsburgh	N/A
Niklas Soerensen; DF	SUI	Thalwil, Switzerland	TSG 1899 Hoffenheim U23	N/A
Joshua Veychek; MF	USA	Pittsburgh, Pennsylvania	Columbus Crew Academy	3/5 stars

== Squad ==
=== Roster ===
As of 12 Sep 2024

Note: Flags indicate national team as defined under FIFA eligibility rules; some limited exceptions apply. Players may hold more than one non-FIFA nationality.

No.	Pos.	Nation	Player
0	GK	USA	Cabral Carter
2	DF	USA	Jackson Gilman
4	DF	ESP	Daniel Gamboa
5	DF	SUI	Niklas Soerensen
6	MF	USA	Logan Oliver
7	MF	ESP	Miguel Bertran
8	MF	COL	Felipe Mercado
9	FW	NOR	Albert Thorsen
10	MF	BRA	Guilherme Feitosa
11	MF	DEN	Casper Grening
12	DF	FRA	Mateo Maillefaud
13	DF	USA	Noah Hall
14	MF	ESP	Arnau Vilamitjana
15	FW	USA	Zahir Dyke
16	FW	GER	Tim Baierlein

No.	Pos.	Nation	Player
17	FW	USA	Luis Sahmkow
18	MF	USA	Joshua Veychek
19	DF	USA	Mason Dancy
20	MF	USA	Mateo Stoka
21	DF	NOR	Casper Svendby
21	FW	DEN	Lasse Dahl
23	FW	USA	Massimo Murania
25	FW	USA	Eben McIntyre
26	MF	USA	Michael Sullivan
27	FW	USA	Alex Hauskrecht
28	MF	USA	Santiago Ferreira
29	DF	USA	Owen Christopher
31	GK	USA	Jack Moxom
32	GK	USA	Cooper Sisson

=== Team management ===
Position	Staff
Athletic Director	Heather Lyke
Head coach	Jay Vidovich
Assistant coach	Bryce Cregan
Assistant coach	Josh Oldroyd
Assistant coach	Zack Schilawski

== Schedule ==
Date Time, TV	Rank^{#}	Opponent^{#}	Result	Record	Site (Attendance) City, State
Exhibition
August 10*; 1:00 p.m.		Maryland	None Reported	–	Ambrose Urbanic Field; Pittsburgh, PA
August 16*; 7:00 p.m.		at Akron	None Reported	–	FirstEnergy Stadium; Akron, OH
Regular season
August 22*; 8:00 p.m., ACCNX		No. 16 Georgetown	W 2–0	1–0–0	Ambrose Urbanic Field (2,000); Pittsburgh, PA
August 25*; 7:00 p.m., ACCNX		Mercyhurst	W 2–0	2–0–0	Ambrose Urbanic Field (762); Pittsburgh, PA
August 30*; 7:00 p.m., BTN+	No. 3	at Penn State	W 2–1	3–0–0	Jeffery Field (1,680); University Park, PA
September 1*; 7:00 p.m., ESPN+	No. 3	at Penn	L 0–1	3–1–0	Rhodes Field (300); Philadelphia, PA
September 7; 8:00 p.m., ACCNX	No. 8	at No. 22 SMU	W 3–1	4–1–0 (1–0–0)	Washburne Stadium (913); Dallas, TX
September 13; 7:00 p.m., ACCNX	No. 7	Louisville	W 3–2	5–1–0 (2–0–0)	Ambrose Urbanic Field (1,207); Pittsburgh, PA
September 17*; 7:00 p.m., ACCNX	No. 2	at Cleveland State	W 4–0	6–1–0	Krenzler Field (247); Cleveland, OH
September 20; 7:00 p.m., ACCNX	No. 2	Boston College	W 2–0	7–1–0 (3–0–0)	Ambrose Urbanic Field (1,007); Pittsburgh, PA
September 28; 7:00 p.m., ACCNX	No. 1	at No. 17 Virginia Tech	W 2–0	8–1–0 (4–0–0)	Thompson Field (1,845); Blacksburg, VA
October 2*; 7:00 p.m., ACCNX	No. 1	Howard	W 8–1	9–1–0	Ambrose Urbanic Field (897); Pittsburgh, PA
October 7*; 7:00 p.m., ACCN	No. 1	No. 6 Denver	W 2–0	10–1–0	Ambrose Urbanic Field; Pittsburgh, PA
October 11; 7:00 p.m., ACCNX	No. 1	California	L 0–1	10–2–0 (4–1–0)	Ambrose Urbanic Field (1,594); Pittsburgh, PA
October 14*; 7:00 p.m., ACCNX	No. 1	High Point	L 0–1	10–3–0	Ambrose Urbanic Field (624); Pittsburgh, PA
October 19; 6:00 p.m., ACCNX	No. 4	at No. 7 North Carolina	W 2–1	11–3–0 (5–1–0)	Dorrance Field (2,125); Chapel Hill, NC
October 25; 7:00 p.m., ACCNX	No. 5	Virginia	W 4–1	12–3–0 (6–1–0)	Ambrose Urbanic Field (1,601); Pittsburgh, PA
November 1; 7:00 p.m., ACCNX	No. 3	at Syracuse	L 0–2	12–4–0 (6–2–0)	SU Soccer Stadium (954); Syracuse, NY
ACC tournament
November 10; 8:00 p.m., ACCN	(1) No. 9	(9) Virginia; Quarterfinals	L 0–2	12–5–0	Ambrose Urbanic Field (987); Pittsburgh, PA
NCAA tournament
November 24; 5:00 p.m., ESPN+	(2) No. 9	Cornell; Second Round	W 1–0	13–5–0	Ambrose Urbanic Field (1,115); Pittsburgh, PA
December 1; 5:00 p.m., ESPN+	(2) No. 9	Kansas City; Third Round	W 3–2	14–5–0	Ambrose Urbanic Field (768); Pittsburgh, PA
December 7; 3:00 p.m., ESPN+	(2) No. 9	No. 17 Vermont; Quarterfinals	L 0–2	14–6–0	Ambrose Urbanic Field (1,416); Pittsburgh, PA
*Non-conference game. ^{#}Rankings from United Soccer Coaches. (#) Tournament seedings in parentheses. All times are in Eastern.

== Awards and honors ==
Recipient	Award	Date	Ref.
Guiherme Feitosa	Pre-Season All-ACC Team	August 14	
Casper Svendby	ACC Defensive Player of the Week – Week 6	October 1	
Arnau Vilamitjana	ACC Defensive Player of the Week – Week 6	October 22	
Jay Vidovich	ACC Coach of the Year	November 13	
Casper Svendby	Defensive Player of the Year	November 13	
Guilherme Feitosa	All-ACC First Team	November 13	
Luis Sahmkow	All-ACC First Team	November 13	
Casper Svendby	All-ACC First Team	November 13	
Casper Grening	All-ACC Second Team	November 13	
Cabral Carter	All-ACC Third Team	November 13	
Jackson Gilman	All-ACC Third Team	November 13	
Niklas Soerensen	ACC All-Freshman Team	November 13	

== Rankings ==
Ranking movements Legend: ██ Increase in ranking ██ Decrease in ranking — = Not ranked ( ) = First-place votes
	Week																
Poll	Pre	1	2	3	4	5	6	7	8	9	10	11	12	13	14	15	Final
United Soccer	—	3	8	7	2	1 (8)	1 (8)	1 (8)	4	5	3	9	Not released				7
TopDrawer Soccer	—	10	12	6	5	3	3	2	5	6	3	6	14	17	8	5	6

== 2025 MLS Super draft ==
Player	Team	Round	Pick #	Position
(United States) Michael Sullivan	Toronto FC	2	39	MF
