= 2024 Clemson Tigers men's soccer team =

American college soccer season

2024 Clemson Tigers men's soccer

NCAA Tournament, Third Round
- Conference: Atlantic Coast Conference
- U. Soc. Coaches poll: No. 11
- TopDrawerSoccer.com: No. 9
- Record: 15–3–4 (5–2–1 ACC)
- Head coach: Mike Noonan (15th season)
- Assistant coaches: Philip Jones (12th season); Camilo Rodriguez (9th season)
- Home stadium: Riggs Field

2024 ACC men's soccer standings
	Conf.					Overall
Team	W		L		T	W		L		T
No. 7 Pittsburgh +	6	–	2	–	0	14	–	6	–	0
No. 9 Clemson +	5	–	2	–	1	15	–	3	–	4
No. 15 Duke +	4	–	1	–	3	11	–	4	–	4
No. 6 Wake Forest ‡	4	–	2	–	2	12	–	5	–	7
No. 5 SMU +	4	–	2	–	2	12	–	3	–	6
North Carolina +	4	–	3	–	1	9	–	4	–	5
No. 13 Stanford +	3	–	2	–	3	9	–	5	–	6
No. 17 Virginia +	3	–	3	–	2	11	–	7	–	3
No. 14 NC State +	3	–	3	–	2	10	–	5	–	5
Notre Dame	3	–	3	–	2	7	–	5	–	5
Syracuse	2	–	4	–	2	7	–	7	–	3
California	2	–	4	–	2	8	–	8	–	2
Boston College	1	–	4	–	3	5	–	5	–	6
Virginia Tech	1	–	5	–	2	7	–	6	–	4
Louisville	0	–	5	–	3	6	–	7	–	4
‡ – ACC tournament champion + – At-large invitation to the 2024 NCAA tournament; As of December 17, 2024; Rankings from United Soccer Coaches; Source: The ACC

The 2024 Clemson Tigers men's soccer team represented Clemson University during the 2024 NCAA Division I men's soccer season. They were led by head coach Mike Noonan, in his fifteenth season. They played their home games at Riggs Field. This was the team's 64th season playing organized men's college soccer and their 37th playing in the Atlantic Coast Conference. They entered the season as defending national champions after defeating Notre Dame in the NCAA Final.

As defending national champions, the Tigers opened as number one in the polls. The started the season with a win against Power 4 opponent Penn State and drew rival South Carolina 2–2. This caused the Tigers to fall to number two where they lost to fifth ranked Stanford 2–3, in their ACC opener. They fell to number five where they defeated Loyola (MD) and Boston College. They later fell to number twelve in the polls where they lost a finals re-match with Notre Dame. This caused Clemson to fall to twenty-fourth in the polls. However, they upset number three North Carolina and shot right back up to number twelve. A defeat of Louisville saw them rise to number eight. A series of four more wins saw them finish the season ranked second. They finished the season with a tie against Virginia Tech.

The Tigers finished the regular season 11–2–3 and 5–2–1 in ACC play. They finished in second place in the ACC. As the second seed in the ACC Tournament, they defeated Louisville in the First Round, Stanford in the Quarterfinals, and California in the Semifinals to return to the Final for a third straight year. They faced Wake Forest, who defeated them in a penalty shoot-out. The Tigers received an at-large bid to the NCAA Tournament, and were the ninth overall seed. A defeat of Providence in the First Round, saw them match-up again with Wake Forest. Clemson lost this round 2–1 in overtime to end their title defense.

== Previous season ==
The Tigers finished the ACC season with a 9–3–3 overall record and a 4–2–2 ACC record. They were the fourth overall seed in the ACC Tournament. They defeated fifth seed Duke in penalties in the Quarterfinals and ninth seed Louisville in the Semifinals to reach the Final. There they faced off against seventh seed North Carolina. The match finished 1–1 and Clemson prevailed in another penalty shootout to win their fifth ACC tournament title. The tournament victory earned Clemson the ACC's automatic bid to the NCAA Tournament. There they were selected as the ninth overall seed. They defeated Charlotte in the second round, eighth seed New Hampshire in the third round, and sixteenth seed Stanford in the Quarterfinals to reach the College Cup. A victory over fifth seed West Virginia saw them reach the national title match against fellow ACC foe Notre Dame. Clemson went on to avenge their regular season loss to Notre Dame and win the title 2–1. The goal allowed in the title match was the only goal allowed by Clemson in the NCAA Tournament. The national title was the fourth in program history and second for head coach Mike Noonan. It was Clemson's second title in three years following their 2021 title.

== Player movement ==
=== Players leaving ===
Players Leaving
Name	Number	Pos.	Height	Weight	Year	Hometown	Reason for departure
Pape Mar Boye	2	DF	6'1"	196	Freshman	Dakar, Senegal	Signed professional contract with Phoenix Rising FC
Isaiah Easley	7	FW	6'0"	170	Sophomore	Kailua-Kona, Hawaii	Transferred to San Francisco
Mohamed Seye	9	FW	6'4"	188	Graduate Student	Valencia, Spain	Graduated
Ousmane Sylla	10	MF	5'8"	170	Senior	Dakar, Senegal	Graduated; drafted 55th overall in 2024 MLS SuperDraft
Brandon Parrish	11	MF	5'10"	165	Senior	Nashville, Tennessee	Graduated; drafted 36th overall in 2024 MLS SuperDraft
Enrique Montana	12	DF	5'10"	162	(redshirt) Senior	Duvall, Washington	Graduated
Shawn Smart	20	DF	5'8"	145	Sophomore	Apopka, Florida	Signed professional contract with Las Vegas Lights FC
Gael Gibert	27	DF	6'0"	184	Graduate Student	Theirs, France	Graduated

=== Players arriving ===
==== Incoming transfers ====
Incoming transfers
Name	Number	Pos.	Height	Weight	Year	Hometown	Previous school
Galen Flynn	4	DF	6'0"	165	(redshirt) Junior	West Hartford, Connecticut	Saint Louis
Mason Lamb	8	DF	6'3"	190	Senior	Clermont, Florida	Cal State Fullerton
Misei Yoshizawa	11	MF	5'8"	143	Junior	Tokyo, Japan	Virginia Tech
Antonio Illuminato	17	MF	5'1"	150	Graduate Student	Cardito, Italy	Drexel

==== Recruiting class ====
Name	Nat.	Hometown	Club	TDS Rating
Vitor Geromel; FW	USA	Wichita, Kansas	Sporting Kansas City (Academy)	3/5 stars
Ransford Gyan; FW	GHA	Sunyani, Ghana	Cedar Stars Academy	3/5 stars
Lukas Magnason; DF	ISL	Kópavogur, Iceland	KR Reykjavik U20	N/A
Wahabu Musah; FW	GHA	Accra, Ghana	SIMA	3/5 stars
Charlie Reed; GK	USA	Austin, Texas	Austin FC	3/5 stars
Paulino Paz; MF	BOL	La Paz, Bolivia	Club Bolívar	N/A
Duncan Wilson; FW	USA	Columbia, South Carolina	South Carolina United FC	4/5 stars

== Squad ==
=== Roster ===
As of September 13, 2024

Note: Flags indicate national team as defined under FIFA eligibility rules; some limited exceptions apply. Players may hold more than one non-FIFA nationality.

No.	Pos.	Nation	Player
0	GK	USA	Patrick Donovan
1	GK	GHA	Joseph Andema
2	DF	ISL	Lukas Magnason
3	DF	USA	Adam Lundegard
4	DF	USA	Galen Flynn
5	DF	USA	Terry Watson
6	DF	FRA	Joran Gerbet
7	FW	GHA	Wahabu Musah
8	DF	USA	Mason Lamb
9	FW	USA	Tyler Trimnal
10	MF	USA	Jackson Worbel
11	MF	JPN	Misei Yoshizawa
12	GK	USA	Charlie Reed
13	DF	USA	Mathieu Brick
14	DF	USA	Titus Sandy Jr
15	FW	EST	Alex Meinhard
16	MF	USA	Mason Jimenez

No.	Pos.	Nation	Player
17	MF	ITA	Antonio Illuminato
18	DF	USA	Matthias Leib
19	FW	USA	James Kelly
20	MF	GHA	Ransford Gyan
21	MF	USA	Noah Behrmann
22	GK	USA	Aiden Hampton
23	FW	USA	Duncan Wilson
24	FW	USA	Vitor Geromel
25	MF	USA	Nathan Richmond
26	FW	ITA	Marco Garcia
28	DF	ENG	Will Cain
29	DF	BRA	Rafael Borlido
30	FW	USA	Remi Okunlola
31	GK	USA	Logan Brown
33	DF	FRA	Arthur Duquenne
34	MF	USA	Samir Dishnica
35	MF	BOL	Paulino Paz

=== Team management ===
Position	Staff
Athletic Director	(United States) Graham Neff
Head coach	(United States) Mike Noonan
Associate head coach	(England) Philip Jones
Assistant Coach	(Colombia) Camilo Rodriguez
Director of Operations	(United States) Rob Thompson

== Schedule ==
Date Time, TV	Rank^{#}	Opponent^{#}	Result	Record	Site (Attendance) City, State
Exhibition
August 10*; 7:00 p.m.	No. 1	at Charlotte	W 1–0	–	Transamerica Field; Charlotte, NC
August 13*; 7:00 p.m.	No. 1	Mobile	W 4–0	–	Riggs Field; Clemson, SC
August 17*; 7:00 p.m.	No. 1	Georgia State	W 1–0	–	Riggs Field; Clemson, SC
Regular season
August 22*; 7:00 p.m., ACCNX	No. 1	Penn State	W 3–0	1–0–0	Riggs Field (4,210); Clemson, SC
August 30*; 7:00 p.m., ESPN+	No. 1	at South Carolina; Rivalry	T 2–2	1–0–1	Stone Stadium (6,400); Columbia, SC
September 6; 7:00 p.m., ACCNX	No. 2	No. 5 Stanford	L 2–3	1–1–1 (0–1–0)	Riggs Field (6,179); Clemson, SC
September 10*; 7:00 p.m., ACCNX	No. 5	Loyola (MD)	W 6–0	2–1–1	Riggs Field (2,557); Clemson, SC
September 13; 7:00 p.m., ACCNX	No. 5	at Boston College	W 1–0	3–1–1 (1–1–0)	Newton Soccer Complex (1,017); Chestnut Hill, MA
September 16*; 6:00 p.m., ESPN+	No. 5	at Holy Cross	T 2–2	3–1–2	Smith Soccer Stadium (2,573); Worcester, MA
September 20; 7:30 p.m., ACCN	No. 4	Wake Forest	W 1–0	4–1–2 (2–1–0)	Riggs Field (6,222); Clemson, SC
September 24*; 7:00 p.m., ACCNX	No. 12	Liberty	W 1–0	5–1–2	Riggs Field (2,551); Clemson, SC
September 27; 7:00 p.m., ACCNX	No. 12	Notre Dame	L 1–2	5–2–2 (2–2–0)	Alumni Stadium (2,820); Notre Dame, IN
October 4; 7:00 p.m., ACCNX	No. 24	No. 3 North Carolina	W 3–2	6–2–2 (3–2–0)	Riggs Field (4,095); Clemson, SC
October 11; 8:00 p.m., ACCN	No. 12	at Louisville	W 3–2	7–2–2 (4–2–0)	Lynn Stadium (850); Louisville, KY
October 15*; 7:00 p.m., ACCNX	No. 8	Queens	W 4–2	8–2–2	Riggs Field (2,091); Clemson, SC
October 22*; 7:00 p.m., ACCNX	No. 3	USC Upstate	W 6–0	9–2–2	Riggs Field (2,214); Clemson, SC
October 25; 8:00 p.m., ACCN	No. 3	Syracuse	W 6–1	10–2–2 (5–2–0)	Riggs Field (2,012); Clemson, SC
October 29*; 7:00 p.m., ACCNX	No. 2	Wofford	W 2–1	11–2–2	Riggs Field (2,326); Clemson, SC
November 1; 6:00 p.m., ACCNX	No. 2	at Virginia Tech	T 2–2	11–2–3 (5–2–1)	Thompson Field (1,127); Blacksburg, VA
ACC tournament
November 6*; 6:00 p.m., ACCN	(2) No. 7	(15) Louisville; First Round	W 3–1	12–2–3	Riggs Field (1,251); Clemson, SC
November 10*; 2:00 p.m., ACCN	(2) No. 7	(7) Stanford; Quarterfinals	W 1–0	13–2–3	Riggs Field (2,036); Clemson, SC
November 14*; 8:00 p.m., ACCN	(2) No. 7	vs. (11) California; Semifinals	W 3–2	14–2–3	WakeMed Soccer Park (645); Cary, NC
November 17*; 12:00 p.m., ESPNU	(2) No. 7	vs. (5) Wake Forest; Final	T 1–1 (6–7 PKs) ^{2OT}	14–2–4	WakeMed Soccer Park (1,839); Cary, NC
NCAA tournament
November 24*; 6:00 p.m., ESPN+	(9) No. 7	No. 25 Providence; Second Round	W 2–0	15–2–4	Riggs Field (2,606); Clemson, SC
December 1*; 6:00 p.m., ESPN+	(9) No. 7	at (8) Wake Forest; Third Round	L 1–2 ^{OT}	15–3–4	Spry Stadium (2,273); Winston-Salem, NC
*Non-conference game. ^{#}Rankings from United Soccer Coaches. (#) Tournament seedings in parentheses. All times are in Eastern.

== Goals record ==
Rank	No.	Nat.	Po.	Name	Regular season	ACC Tournament	NCAA Tournament	Total
1	15	(Estonia)	FW	Alex Meinhard	8	3	0	11
2	6	(France)	DF	Joran Gerbet	6	1	0	7
3	7	(Ghana)	FW	Wahabu Musah	4	0	2	6
3	9	(United States)	FW	Tyler Trimnal	5	1	0	6
5	20	(Ghana)	MF	Ransford Gyan	3	1	1	5
6	11	(Japan)	MF	Misei Yoshizawa	4	0	0	4
6	17	(Italy)	MF	Antonio Illuminato	4	0	0	4
6	19	(United States)	FW	James Kelly	4	0	0	4
9	2	(Iceland)	DF	Lukas Magnason	1	1	0	2
9	10	(United States)	MF	Jackson Wrobel	2	0	0	2
9	30	(United States)	FW	Remi Okunlola	1	1	0	2
12	16	(United States)	MF	Mason Jimenez	1	0	0	1
12	33	(France)	DF	Arthur Duquenne	1	0	0	1
Opponent own goal					1	0	0	1
Total					45	8	2	55

== Disciplinary record ==
Rank	No.	Nat.	Po.	Name	Regular Season			ACC Tournament			NCAA Tournament			Total		
Rank	No.	Nat.	Po.	Name	Booked	(yellow card) (yellow-red card)	Sent off (straight red)	Booked	(yellow card) (yellow-red card)	Sent off (straight red)	Booked	(yellow card) (yellow-red card)	Sent off (straight red)	Booked	(yellow card) (yellow-red card)	Sent off (straight red)
1	4	(United States)	DF	Galen Flynn	2	0	2	1	0	0	0	0	0	3	0	2
2	3	(United States)	DF	Adam Lundegard	4	1	0	1	0	0	0	0	0	5	1	0
3	2	(Iceland)	DF	Lukas Magnason	3	0	0	2	0	0	0	0	0	5	0	0
4	15	(Estonia)	FW	Alex Meinhard	2	0	0	1	0	0	0	0	0	3	0	0
4	30	(United States)	FW	Remi Okunlola	3	0	0	0	0	0	0	0	0	3	0	0
6	6	(France)	DF	Joran Gerbet	2	0	0	0	0	0	0	0	0	2	0	0
6	7	(Ghana)	FW	Wahabu Musah	2	0	0	0	0	0	0	0	0	2	0	0
6	8	(United States)	DF	Mason Lamb	2	0	0	0	0	0	0	0	0	2	0	0
6	9	(United States)	FW	Tyler Trimnal	1	0	0	1	0	0	0	0	0	2	0	0
6	17	(Italy)	MF	Antonio Illuminato	0	0	1	0	0	0	0	0	0	0	0	1
6	35	(Bolivia)	MF	Paulino Paz	2	0	0	0	0	0	0	0	0	2	0	0
12	11	(Japan)	MF	Misei Yoshizawa	1	0	0	0	0	0	0	0	0	1	0	0
12	14	(United States)	DF	Titus Sandy Jr	0	0	0	0	0	0	1	0	0	1	0	0
12	20	(Ghana)	MF	Ransford Gyan	0	0	0	0	0	0	1	0	0	1	0	0
12	25	(United States)	MF	Nathan Richmond	1	0	0	0	0	0	0	0	0	1	0	0
12	33	(France)	DF	Arthur Duquenne	1	0	0	0	0	0	0	0	0	1	0	0
Team					1	0	0	0	0	0	0	0	0	1	0	0
Total					28	1	3	6	0	0	2	0	0	36	1	3

== Awards and honors ==
Recipient	Award	Date	Ref.
Joran Gerbet	Pre-Season All-ACC Team	August 14	
Joran Gerbet	ACC Offensive Player of the Week – Week 7	October 8	
Alex Meinhard	ACC Offensive Player of the Week – Week 10	October 29	
Joran Gerbet	ACC Midfielder of the Year	November 13, 2024	
Ransford Gyan	ACC Freshman of the Year	November 13, 2024	
Joran Gerbet	All-ACC First Team	November 13, 2024	
Alex Meinhard	All-ACC First Team	November 13, 2024	
Ransford Gyan	All-ACC Second Team	November 13, 2024	
Ransford Gyan	ACC All-Freshman Team	November 13, 2024	
Lukas Magnason	ACC All-Freshman Team	November 13, 2024	
Wahabu Musah	ACC All-Freshman Team	November 13, 2024	
Joran Gerbet	All ACC-Tournament Team	November 17, 2024	
Adam Lundegard	All ACC-Tournament Team	November 17, 2024	
Alex Meinhard	All ACC-Tournament Team	November 17, 2024	

== 2025 MLS Super Draft ==
Player	Team	Round	Pick #	Position
Joran Gerbet	Orlando City SC	1	27	MF
Titus Sandy Jr	Orlando City SC	2	46	DF
Shawn Smart	Colorado Rapids	3	68	DF
Arthur Duquenne	CF Montréal	3	73	DF

== Rankings ==
Ranking movements Legend: ██ Increase in ranking ██ Decrease in ranking ( ) = First-place votes
	Week																
Poll	Pre	1	2	3	4	5	6	7	8	9	10	11	12	13	14	15	Final
United Soccer	1	1 (7)	2 (1)	5	4	12	24	12	8	3	2	7	Not released				9
TopDrawer Soccer	1	1	6	10	7	12	17	11	9	9	6	7	3	6	5	11	11
