= Portor, Ghana =

Town in Ghana

Portor is a small farming community located in the Kintampo Municipal District in the Bono East Region of Ghana. The town has a population of 3,000. Portor is located on the KIntampo-Buipe highway situated close to the villages Kadelso and Gulumpe.

in 2016, the community went through an unrest as a result of chieftaincy disputes. The town though found in the Bono East Region, is under the Gonja traditional area.
