= Maloney Field at Laird Q. Cagan Stadium =

Stadium in Stanford, California

Maloney Field
- The Farm
- Interactive map of Maloney Field
- Full name: Maloney Field at Laird Q. Cagan Stadium
- Former names: Maloney Field (1973–2007)
- Address: 641 Nelson Road; Stanford, CA 94305
- Coordinates: 37.4331017°N 122.1580511°W
- Owner: Stanford University
- Operator: Stanford University Athletics
- Capacity: 2,952
- Type: Soccer-specific stadium
- Surface: Bermuda rye blend
- Scoreboard: Daktronics
- Field size: 115 x 75 yards
- Field shape: Rectangular
- Acreage: 4
- Public transit: California Avenue Station

Construction
- Opened: August 15, 1973; 53 years ago
- Renovated: 1997, 2011

Tenants
- Stanford Cardinal (NCAA) teams: men's and women's soccer; women's lacrosse

Website
- gostanford.com/cagan-stadium

Maloney Field at Laird Q. Cagan Stadium (formerly, Maloney Field) is a soccer-specific stadium on the campus of Stanford University in Stanford, California. The stadium hosts the Stanford Cardinal men's and women's soccer teams, as well as the women's lacrosse team. The facility opened in 1973, and featured renovations in 1997 and 2011.

The stadium was named after Harry Maloney, the first Sanford's soccer coach, who remained with the team from 1908 until its retirement in 1944. Maloney was responsible for the development of the program since its creation as a preparation for rugby players during the years American football was banned from the Big Game after increasing protests against the violence of the sport. He helped consolidate soccer as an independent and competitive sport, receiving varsity status in 1911.

In addition to Cardinal matches, the stadium has been used as a practice training ground for the United States men's and women's national soccer team. The stadium has also been used as a venue for Major League Soccer's San Jose Earthquakes for practices and U.S. Open Cup fixtures.

The current capacity since the 2011 renovation is 2,952.
