= 2024 NCAA Division I men's soccer season =

American college soccer season

- Duration: August 22 – December 16, 2024
- Number of teams: 212
- Preseason No. 1: Clemson
- Top goalscorer: 23 goals Emil Jaaskelainen (Akron)

Statistics
- Biggest home win: 14 goals Duke 14- 0 Averett (September 1)
- Biggest away win: 4 goals USC Upstate 1–5 Charleston (August 29) Eastern Illinois 1–5 Detroit Mercy (September 1) Northern Illinois 2–6 Kansas City (September 6)
- Highest scoring: 14 goals Duke 14- 0 Averett (September 1)
- Longest winning run: 9 games Dayton (October 15 – November 30)
- Longest unbeaten run: 10 games Vermont (8–0–2) (November 1-present)
- Longest winless run: 16 games Radford (0–13–3) August 23-present
- Longest losing run: 8 games Gonzaga (September 28 – present)
- Highest attendance: 9,985 Cal Poly @ UCSB (October 6)

Tournament
- Duration: November 21 to December 16, 2024

Men's College Cup
- Date: December 13–16
- Site: WakeMed Soccer Park; Cary, NC
- Champions: Vermont
- Runners-up: Marshall

Seasons
- ← 2023 2025 →

The 2024 NCAA Division I men's soccer season was the 66th season of NCAA championship men's college soccer. The season began on August 22, 2024, and concluded on December 16, 2024. Clemson was the defending national champion.

The Vermont Catamounts achieved their first national championship in team history, defeating Marshall 2–1 on a golden goal in the final.

== Changes from 2023 ==
=== Coaching changes ===
The following coaching changes occurred during the 2023–24 offseason.

Program	Outgoing coach	Manner of departure	Date of vacancy	Incoming coach	Date of appointment
Marquette	Louis Bennett	Resigned	November 1, 2023	David Korn	December 11, 2023
Bradley	Jim DeRose	Retired	November 2, 2023	Tim Regan	November 2, 2023
Mount St. Mary's	Bryan Cunningham	Resigned	November 2, 2023	Brett Teach	December 1, 2023
NC State	George Kiefer	Terminated; Hired by Grand Canyon	November 3, 2023	Marc Hubbard	December 9, 2023
North Florida	Derek Marinatos	Reassigned by department	November 6, 2023	Jamie Davies	December 5, 2023
Old Dominion	Alan Dawson	Retired	November 5, 2023	Tennant McVea	November 5, 2023
Villanova	Tom Carlin	Retired	November 16, 2023	Mark Fetrow	November 16, 2023
Drexel	Mark Fetrow	Hired by Villanova	November 16, 2023	David Castellanos	January 11, 2024
Fairfield	Carl Rees	Resigned	November 29, 2023	Krystian Witkowski	January 22, 2024
Longwood	Jon Atkinson	Reassigned by department	November 29, 2023	Paul Gilbert	December 21, 2023
Grand Canyon	Mike Kraus	Terminated	December 1, 2023	George Kiefer	December 20, 2023
UAB	Jeff Kinney	No announcement	December 8, 2023	David Lilly	December 8, 2023
New Hampshire	Marc Hubbard	Hired by NC State	December 9, 2023	Rich Weinrebe	January 4, 2024
East Tennessee State	David Lilly	Hired by UAB	December 8, 2023	Allen Vital	February 12, 2024
Northeastern	Rich Weinrebe	Hired by New Hampshire	January 4, 2024	Jeremy Bonomo	February 2, 2024
Green Bay	Jeremy Bonomo	Hired by Northeastern	February 2, 2024	John O'Reilly	February 2, 2024
Oakland	Eric Pogue	Terminated	February 6, 2024	Paul Doroh	April 22, 2024
Holy Cross	Marco Koolman	Retired	May 15, 2024	Matt Brown	June 17, 2024
Fairleigh Dickinson	Seth Roland	Retired	June 3, 2024	Jaymee Highcock	June 11, 2024
Air Force	Doug Hill	Retired	July 24, 2024	Kevin Doyle	July 25, 2024

=== Conference realignment ===
Team	Conference in 2023	Conference in 2024
Western Illinois	Summit	OVC
Chicago State	OVC	NEC
Mercyhurst	PSAC (Div. II)	NEC
Merrimack	NEC	MAAC
Sacred Heart	NEC	MAAC
UCLA	Pac-12	Big Ten
Washington	Pac-12	Big Ten
California	Pac-12	ACC
Stanford	Pac-12	ACC
Oregon State	Pac-12	WCC
San Diego State	Pac-12	WAC
SMU	American	ACC

== New programs ==
On April 4, the Northeast Conference announced that it had invited Mercyhurst University of the Division II Pennsylvania State Athletic Conference to join the conference and begin the transition to Division I.

== Other news ==
The team formerly known as the IUPUI Jaguars officially changed its athletic identity to the IU Indy Jaguars on July 1, 2024 as Indiana University–Purdue University Indianapolis separated into two independent institutions, Indiana University Indianapolis and Purdue University in Indianapolis. With the Indiana University (IU) system retaining most of the former joint venture, the athletic program remains with IU.

On October 25, 2024, the American Athletic Conference announced that Missouri State would join as a men's soccer affiliate in the 2025 season. This move coincides with Missouri State's move to Conference USA, which currently sponsors soccer only for women.

== Season outlook ==
=== Preseason polls ===
United Soccer Coaches
Rank	Team
1	Clemson
2	Notre Dame
3	West Virginia
4	Oregon State
5	Stanford
6	North Carolina
7	Indiana
8	Marshall
9	New Hampshire
10	SMU
11	Loyola Marymount
12	Western Michigan
13	Virginia
14	Vermont
15	Wake Forest
16	Georgetown
17	Hofstra
18	James Madison
19	UCF
20	Duke
21	UCLA
22	Portland
23	Seattle
24	Louisville
25	Syracuse

Top Drawer Soccer
Rank	Team
1	Clemson
2	Notre Dame
3	West Virginia
4	Stanford
5	Indiana
6	Marshall
7	North Carolina
8	Virginia
9	Oregon State
10	SMU
11	Georgetown
12	James Madison
13	Loyola Marymount
14	Vermont
15	Denver
16	Hofstra
17	New Hampshire
18	UCF
19	Wake Forest
20	Duke
21	UCLA
22	Kentucky
23	Portland
24	Syracuse
25	SIUE

== Regular season ==
=== Major upsets ===
In this list, a "major upset" is defined as a game won by an unranked team that defeats a ranked team, or a team ranked 10 spots lower than the other team.

All rankings are from the United Soccer Coaches Poll.

Date	Winner	Score	Loser
August 22	@ Pittsburgh	2–0	No. 16 Georgetown
August 22	VCU	2–1	@ No. 15 Wake Forest
August 22	No. 21 UCLA	2–0	@ No. 11 Loyola Marymount
August 23	@ Saint Louis	2–0	No. 7 Indiana
August 25	Denver	1–0	@ No. 5 Stanford
August 25	Colgate	1–0	@ No. 13 Virginia
August 25	Cal State Northridge	2–1	@ No. 11 Loyola Marymount
August 26	@ Washington	1–0	No. 4 Oregon State
August 29	@ Xavier	2–0	No. 2 Marshall
August 29	@ SMU	1–0	No. 6 Saint Louis
September 1	@ Penn	1–0	No. 3 Pittsburgh
September 1	@ Oral Roberts	2–1	No. 24 UC Santa Barbara
September 2	Le Moyne	1–0	@ No. 7 Syracuse
September 5	Cal State Bakersfield	3–2	@ No. 18 Portland
September 5	Cal State Fullerton	3–1	@ No. 6 UCLA
September 6	@ Akron	4–0	No. 13 VCU
September 6	Notre Dame	2–1	@ No. 15 Louisville
September 9	@ James Madison	1–0	No. 14 Georgetown
September 9	@ Washington	2–1	No. 11 Seattle U
September 11	@ FIU	4–3	No. 10 UCF
September 12	Gonzaga	2–1	@ No. 9 Seattle U
September 13	@ Marist	2–1	No. 18 Fordham
September 13	@ Maryland	3–0	No. 8 Wisconsin
September 13	UCLA	1–0	No. 14 Northwestern
September 16	@ VCU	2–0	No. 15 Penn
September 17	Furman	4–2	@ No. 23 Charleston
September 20	@ Providence	1–0	No. 8 Seton Hall
September 20	@ SMU	2–0	No. 13 Virginia Tech
September 20	@ Washington	2–0	No. 20 Northwestern
September 21	@ Monmouth	2–1	No. 12 Hofstra
September 22	Cal State Fullerton	2–0	@ No. 15 San Diego
September 27	@ Notre Dame	2–1	No. 12 Clemson
September 28	@ Cal Poly	2–0	No. 13 UC Santa Barbara
October 1	High Point	1–0	@ No. 17 Elon
October 1	@ Indiana	3–2	No. 8 Wisconsin
October 4	@ Georgetown	3–0	No. 21 Providence
October 4	@ No. 19 Clemson	3–2	No. 3 North Carolina
October 4	@ Virginia	2–1	No. 19 Virginia Tech
October 4	Rutgers	2–1	@ No. 8 Wisconsin
October 5	@ Drexel	5–4	No. 14 Hofsra
October 5	Fordham	1–0	@ No. 23 VCU
October 5	@ Memphis	1–0	No. 9 Charlotte
October 8	@ Stony Brook	2–1	No. 11 Seton Hall
October 8	@ Virginia	1–0	No. 8 James Madison
October 11	@ Michigan State	2–0	No. 25 Wisconsin
October 11	California	1–0	@ No. 1 Pittsburgh
October 11	@ UCLA	2–1	No. 2 Ohio State
October 12	Duquesne	2–1	@ No. 13 George Mason
October 12	@ Kansas City	1–0	No. 3 Denver
October 14	High Point	1–0	@ No. 1 Pittsburgh
October 15	@ Dayton	5–1	No. 1 West Virginia
October 15	Indiana	5–0	@ No. 18 Michigan
October 15	@ Monmouth	1–0	No. 12 Penn
October 17	@ San Francisco	2–0	No. 2 Stanford
October 18	@ Northwestern	1–0	No. 18 Michigan
October 19	@ No. 23 NC State	5–1	No. 10 SMU
October 25	@ Michigan	2–0	No. 2 Maryland
October 25	@ No. 25 Indiana	2–1	No. 15 UCLA
October 26	@ Charleston	3–1	No. 18 Hofstra
October 26	@ UMass	1–0	No. 23 Duquesne
October 26	@ UMBC	1–0	No. 16 Vermont
October 29	@ Rutgers	3–1	No. 10 Maryland
November 1	@ Bowling Green	3–0	No. 14 Western Michigan
November 1	Gardner-Webb	1–0	@ No. 11 High Point
November 1	@ Syracuse	2–0	No. 3 Pittsburgh
November 1	@ Wake Forest	1–0	No. 12 NC State
November 1	Boston College	1–0	@ No. 8 North Carolina
November 1	California	1–0	@ No. 22 Stanford
November 2	@ St. John's	2–0	No. 18 Georgetown
November 3	Washington	2–0	@ No. 25 UCLA

=== Conference standings ===
2024 ACC men's soccer standings
	Conf.					Overall
Team	W		L		T	W		L		T
No. 7 Pittsburgh +	6	–	2	–	0	14	–	6	–	0
No. 9 Clemson +	5	–	2	–	1	15	–	3	–	4
No. 15 Duke +	4	–	1	–	3	11	–	4	–	4
No. 6 Wake Forest ‡	4	–	2	–	2	12	–	5	–	7
No. 5 SMU +	4	–	2	–	2	12	–	3	–	6
North Carolina +	4	–	3	–	1	9	–	4	–	5
No. 13 Stanford +	3	–	2	–	3	9	–	5	–	6
No. 17 Virginia +	3	–	3	–	2	11	–	7	–	3
No. 14 NC State +	3	–	3	–	2	10	–	5	–	5
Notre Dame	3	–	3	–	2	7	–	5	–	5
Syracuse	2	–	4	–	2	7	–	7	–	3
California	2	–	4	–	2	8	–	8	–	2
Boston College	1	–	4	–	3	5	–	5	–	6
Virginia Tech	1	–	5	–	2	7	–	6	–	4
Louisville	0	–	5	–	3	6	–	7	–	4
‡ – ACC tournament champion + – At-large invitation to the 2024 NCAA tournament; As of December 17, 2024; Rankings from United Soccer Coaches; Source: The ACC

2024 America East Conference men's soccer standings
	Conf.					Overall
Team	W		L		T	W		L		T
New Hampshire	4	–	1	–	2	7	–	3	–	7
No. 1 Vermont ‡	4	–	1	–	2	16	–	2	–	6
UMBC	4	–	2	–	1	8	–	7	–	4
Bryant	4	–	3	–	0	11	–	5	–	4
NJIT	2	–	3	–	2	6	–	8	–	4
Binghamton	2	–	3	–	2	8	–	7	–	4
UMass Lowell	1	–	4	–	2	6	–	5	–	5
Albany	1	–	5	–	1	4	–	12	–	2
‡ – AEC tournament champion + – At-large invitation to the 2024 NCAA tournament; As of December 17, 2024; Rankings from United Soccer Coaches; Source: America East

2024 American Athletic Conference men's soccer standings
	Conf.					Overall
Team	W		L		T	W		L		T
Memphis	4	–	1	–	2	7	–	7	–	3
South Florida	4	–	3	–	0	6	–	6	–	4
Charlotte ‡	3	–	2	–	2	11	–	3	–	5
Florida Atlantic	3	–	3	–	1	7	–	6	–	3
FIU	2	–	2	–	3	6	–	6	–	6
Temple	2	–	2	–	3	5	–	7	–	5
Tulsa	2	–	4	–	1	3	–	9	–	3
UAB	1	–	4	–	2	4	–	6	–	5
‡ – AAC tournament champion + – At-large invitation to the 2024 NCAA tournament; As of December 17, 2024; Rankings from United Soccer Coaches; Source: The American

2024 ASUN Conference men's soccer standings
	Conf.					Overall
Team	W		L		T	W		L		T
North Florida ‡	4	–	2	–	1	7	–	8	–	4
Stetson	3	–	0	–	4	4	–	6	–	6
Florida Gulf Coast	3	–	3	–	1	4	–	10	–	3
Central Arkansas	3	–	3	–	1	8	–	7	–	3
Queens ^{#}	2	–	2	–	3	5	–	10	–	3
Jacksonville	2	–	3	–	2	4	–	6	–	5
Bellarmine	2	–	3	–	2	5	–	6	–	5
Lipscomb	1	–	4	–	2	3	–	8	–	5
‡ – 2024 ASUN tournament champion + – At-large invitation to the 2024 NCAA tournament ^{#} – Ineligible for post-season (In transition); As of December 16, 2024; Rankings from United Soccer Coaches; Source: ASUN

2024 Atlantic 10 Conference men's soccer standings
	Conf.					Overall
Team	W		L		T	W		L		T
George Mason	6	–	1	–	1	13	–	4	–	1
No. 12 Dayton ‡	5	–	1	–	2	13	–	2	–	3
Duquesne	5	–	2	–	1	11	–	4	–	2
No. 8 UMass +	5	–	2	–	1	10	–	3	–	5
Fordham +	4	–	1	–	3	8	–	5	–	5
Saint Louis +	4	–	1	–	3	8	–	4	–	8
Davidson	4	–	4	–	0	6	–	7	–	5
La Salle	3	–	3	–	2	6	–	8	–	4
Loyola Chicago	3	–	5	–	1	5	–	10	–	3
St. Bonaventure	2	–	4	–	2	6	–	8	–	3
VCU	1	–	4	–	3	4	–	6	–	7
Rhode Island	2	–	6	–	0	7	–	7	–	3
George Washington	1	–	6	–	1	3	–	12	–	2
Saint Joseph's	1	–	7	–	0	4	–	12	–	0
‡ – 2024 Atlantic 10 tournament champion + – At-large invitation to the 2024 NCAA tournament; As of December 18, 2024; Rankings from United Soccer Coaches; Source: Atlantic 10

2024 Big East Conference men's soccer standings
	Conf.					Overall
Team	W		L		T	W		L		T
East
Providence +	5	–	1	–	2	13	–	6	–	3
St. John's	5	–	1	–	2	9	–	6	–	5
No. 25 Georgetown ‡	5	–	2	–	1	11	–	5	–	5
Seton Hall	4	–	3	–	1	11	–	6	–	1
UConn	3	–	2	–	3	8	–	4	–	6
Villanova	0	–	7	–	1	1	–	10	–	6
Midwest
No. 21 Akron +	7	–	0	–	1	12	–	5	–	4
Creighton	4	–	3	–	1	9	–	6	–	3
DePaul	2	–	4	–	2	6	–	8	–	3
Marquette	2	–	4	–	2	6	–	7	–	4
Xavier	1	–	5	–	2	4	–	8	–	5
Butler	1	–	7	–	0	4	–	10	–	3
‡ – 2024 Big East tournament champion + – At-large invitation to the 2024 NCAA tournament; As of December 18, 2024; Rankings from United Soccer Coaches; Source: Big East

2024 Big South Conference men's soccer standings
	Conf.					Overall
Team	W		L		T	W		L		T
High Point	6	–	1	–	0	11	–	4	–	2
Gardner–Webb ‡	5	–	0	–	2	13	–	4	–	3
Winthrop	4	–	3	–	0	5	–	12	–	1
UNC Asheville	3	–	2	–	2	7	–	4	–	4
Longwood	2	–	4	–	1	5	–	10	–	3
Presbyterian	2	–	4	–	1	6	–	8	–	2
USC Upstate	2	–	5	–	0	3	–	14	–	0
Radford	0	–	5	–	2	0	–	13	–	3
‡ – 2024 Big South tournament champion + – At-large invitation to the 2024 NCAA tournament; As of December 17, 2024; Rankings from United Soccer Coaches; Source: Big South

2024 Big Ten Conference men's soccer standings
	Conf.						Overall
Team	W		L		T	PCT	W		L		T	PCT
No. 3 Ohio State ‍†‍‡‍	7	–	1	–	2	.800	16	–	2	–	4	.818
No. 11 Indiana ‍†‍‍^{y}	7	–	1	–	2	.800	11	–	5	–	5	.643
Maryland ‍‍‍^{y}	5	–	3	–	2	.600	9	–	6	–	5	.575
Washington ‍‍‍^{y}	4	–	3	–	3	.550	8	–	6	–	7	.548
Michigan State ‍‍‍	4	–	4	–	2	.500	5	–	7	–	5	.441
UCLA ‍‍‍^{y}	3	–	4	–	3	.450	7	–	6	–	6	.526
Michigan ‍‍‍^{y}	2	–	3	–	5	.450	9	–	5	–	7	.595
Northwestern ‍‍‍	3	–	6	–	1	.350	9	–	7	–	1	.559
Rutgers ‍‍‍	3	–	6	–	1	.350	6	–	9	–	2	.412
Wisconsin ‍‍‍	2	–	5	–	3	.350	7	–	5	–	3	.567
Penn State ‍‍‍	2	–	6	–	2	.300	5	–	9	–	2	.375
† – Conference champion ‡ – 2024 B1G tournament champion y – Invited to the 2024 NCAA Tournament; As of December 18, 2024; Rankings from United Soccer Coaches; Source: Big Ten

2024 Big West Conference men's soccer standings
	Conf.					Overall
Team	W		L		T	W		L		T
Cal Poly	4	–	1	–	4	7	–	4	–	8
UCSB +	4	–	2	–	3	12	–	5	–	5
UC Irvine	4	–	3	–	2	8	–	8	–	3
UC Davis ‡	4	–	3	–	2	10	–	6	–	6
Cal State Bakersfield	4	–	3	–	2	7	–	6	–	4
Cal State Fullerton	3	–	2	–	4	7	–	6	–	7
UC Riverside	3	–	2	–	4	5	–	6	–	5
UC San Diego	3	–	5	–	1	4	–	9	–	5
Sacramento State	3	–	6	–	0	6	–	10	–	2
CSUN	0	–	5	–	4	2	–	8	–	7
‡ – 2024 Big West tournament champion + – At-large invitation to the 2024 NCAA tournament; As of December 17, 2024; Rankings from United Soccer Coaches; Source: Big West

2024 Coastal Athletic Association men's soccer standings
	Conf.					Overall
Team	W		L		T	W		L		T
Elon	6	–	2	–	0	10	–	7	–	1
Drexel	5	–	2	–	1	9	–	6	–	2
Monmouth	4	–	1	–	3	8	–	2	–	6
No. 23 Hofstra ‡	5	–	3	–	0	14	–	5	–	2
Charleston	4	–	2	–	2	10	–	6	–	2
UNCW	4	–	4	–	0	6	–	9	–	5
Campbell	3	–	4	–	1	8	–	6	–	4
William & Mary	3	–	4	–	1	5	–	10	–	1
Northeastern	2	–	4	–	2	4	–	5	–	7
Delaware	2	–	6	–	0	7	–	7	–	2
Stony Brook	0	–	6	–	2	3	–	10	–	3
‡ – 2024 CAA tournament champion + – At-large invitation to the 2024 NCAA tournament; As of December 17, 2024; Rankings from United Soccer Coaches; Source: CAA

2024 Horizon League men's soccer standings
	Conf.					Overall
Team	W		L		T	W		L		T
Oakland	6	–	1	–	2	9	–	7	–	2
Robert Morris ‡	4	–	3	–	2	9	–	7	–	3
Milwaukee	4	–	3	–	2	9	–	5	–	5
Green Bay	4	–	3	–	2	11	–	7	–	2
Cleveland State	4	–	4	–	1	7	–	7	–	3
Purdue Fort Wayne	4	–	4	–	1	7	–	7	–	2
Detroit Mercy	2	–	3	–	4	3	–	10	–	4
Wright State	3	–	5	–	1	7	–	9	–	2
Northern Kentucky	2	–	3	–	4	3	–	6	–	7
IU Indy	2	–	6	–	1	5	–	9	–	3
‡ – 2024 Horizon tournament champion + – At-large invitation to the 2024 NCAA tournament; As of December 17, 2024; Rankings from United Soccer Coaches; Source: Horizon

2024 Ivy League men's soccer standings
	Conf.					Overall
Team	W		L		T	W		L		T
No. 19 Penn +	7	–	0	–	0	15	–	4	–	1
No. 22 Cornell +	5	–	2	–	0	13	–	4	–	2
Princeton ‡	5	–	2	–	0	12	–	7	–	0
Brown	3	–	4	–	0	8	–	8	–	1
Harvard	3	–	4	–	0	4	–	7	–	4
Dartmouth	2	–	4	–	1	5	–	8	–	3
Columbia	1	–	5	–	1	1	–	12	–	1
Yale	1	–	6	–	0	4	–	11	–	1
‡ – 2024 Ivy League tournament champion + – At-large invitation to the 2024 NCAA tournament; As of December 17, 2024; Rankings from United Soccer Coaches; Source: Ivy League

2024 Metro Atlantic Athletic Conference men's soccer standings
	Conf.					Overall
Team	W		L		T	W		L		T
Iona ‡	6	–	1	–	1	11	–	5	–	3
Rider	6	–	1	–	1	14	–	5	–	1
Siena	4	–	1	–	3	7	–	5	–	6
Quinnipiac	4	–	4	–	0	7	–	9	–	1
Marist	3	–	3	–	2	7	–	9	–	2
Manhattan	3	–	3	–	2	5	–	8	–	3
Sacred Heart	3	–	3	–	2	8	–	6	–	2
Mount St. Mary's	3	–	3	–	2	3	–	11	–	4
Canisius	2	–	3	–	3	4	–	8	–	4
Fairfield	2	–	3	–	3	3	–	9	–	5
Merrimack	2	–	4	–	2	3	–	11	–	2
Saint Peter's	2	–	4	–	2	2	–	10	–	3
Niagara	0	–	7	–	1	2	–	12	–	2
‡ – 2024 MAAC tournament champion + – At-large invitation to the 2023 NCAA tournament; As of December 17, 2024; Rankings from United Soccer Coaches; Source: MAAC

2024 Missouri Valley Conference men's soccer standings
	Conf.					Overall
Team	W		L		T	W		L		T
No. 11 Missouri State +	7	–	0	–	1	12	–	3	–	2
Drake	5	–	1	–	2	9	–	5	–	3
Bowling Green	4	–	3	–	1	12	–	6	–	2
No. 23 Western Michigan+	3	–	1	–	4	11	–	2	–	6
Evansville ‡	4	–	3	–	1	11	–	6	–	3
UIC	3	–	5	–	0	7	–	10	–	0
Bradley	1	–	5	–	2	4	–	8	–	3
Belmont	1	–	5	–	2	5	–	8	–	4
Northern Illinois	1	–	6	–	1	3	–	12	–	1
‡ – 2024 MVC tournament champion + – At-large invitation to the 2024 NCAA tournament; As of November 18, 2024; Rankings from United Soccer Coaches; Source: MVC

2024 Northeast Conference men's soccer standings
	Conf.					Overall
Team	W		L		T	W		L		T
Mercyhurst ^{#}	5	–	1	–	2	8	–	7	–	2
Fairleigh Dickinson	5	–	2	–	1	10	–	4	–	5
Saint Francis (PA)	5	–	2	–	1	7	–	7	–	2
LIU ‡	4	–	1	–	3	8	–	5	–	7
Le Moyne ^{#}	4	–	3	–	1	7	–	6	–	4
Stonehill ^{#}	2	–	4	–	2	6	–	9	–	3
Chicago State	2	–	5	–	1	3	–	11	–	1
Howard	2	–	5	–	1	2	–	11	–	3
Central Connecticut	1	–	7	–	0	1	–	14	–	1
‡ – 2024 NEC tournament champion + – At-large invitation to the 2024 NCAA tournament ^{#} – Ineligible for post-season (In transition); As of December 17, 2024; Rankings from United Soccer Coaches; Source: NEC

2024 Ohio Valley Conference men's soccer standings
	Conf.					Overall
Team	W		L		T	W		L		T
SIU Edwardsville ‡	8	–	1	–	1	12	–	5	–	3
Lindenwood ^{#}	6	–	2	–	2	11	–	6	–	3
Houston Christian	5	–	2	–	3	8	–	7	–	5
Liberty	5	–	3	–	2	7	–	7	–	3
Incarnate Word	3	–	2	–	5	6	–	6	–	6
Western Illinois	3	–	7	–	0	8	–	11	–	1
Southern Indiana ^{#}	1	–	7	–	2	2	–	14	–	2
Eastern Illinois	1	–	8	–	1	2	–	12	–	2
‡ – 2024 Ohio Valley tournament champion + – At-large invitation to the 2024 NCAA tournament ^{#} – Ineligible for NCAA tournament (In transition); As of December 17, 2024; Rankings from United Soccer Coaches; Source: OVC

2024 Patriot League men's soccer standings
	Conf.					Overall
Team	W		L		T	W		L		T
Boston U	4	–	1	–	4	4	–	4	–	10
Bucknell ‡	4	–	1	–	4	7	–	7	–	6
American	4	–	2	–	3	5	–	5	–	9
Colgate	4	–	3	–	2	8	–	9	–	3
Lehigh	4	–	4	–	1	6	–	10	–	3
Loyola (MD)	3	–	3	–	3	4	–	7	–	6
Holy Cross	3	–	3	–	3	4	–	9	–	5
Lafayette	3	–	4	–	2	8	–	6	–	4
Navy	3	–	5	–	1	4	–	8	–	4
Army	1	–	7	–	1	4	–	11	–	2
‡ – 2024 Patriot League tournament champion + – At-large invitation to the 2024 NCAA tournament; As of December 17, 2024; Rankings from United Soccer Coaches; Source: Patriot League

2024 Southern Conference men's soccer standings
	Conf.					Overall
Team	W		L		T	W		L		T
UNCG	3	–	1	–	1	10	–	2	–	5
ETSU	3	–	1	–	1	5	–	7	–	5
Wofford	3	–	2	–	0	8	–	6	–	3
Furman ‡	2	–	1	–	2	9	–	4	–	6
Mercer	1	–	2	–	2	6	–	5	–	7
VMI	0	–	5	–	0	5	–	11	–	2
‡– 2024 SoCon tournament Champion + – At-large invitation to the 2024 NCAA tournament; As of December 17, 2024; Rankings from United Soccer Coaches; Source: SoCon

2024 Summit League men's soccer standings
	Conf.					Overall
Team	W		L		T	W		L		T
No. 4 Denver +	7	–	1	–	0	15	–	3	–	5
No. 18 Kansas City ‡	5	–	2	–	1	14	–	5	–	3
Oral Roberts	4	–	4	–	0	7	–	6	–	3
Omaha	2	–	5	–	1	7	–	7	–	3
St. Thomas (MN) ^{#}	1	–	7	–	0	4	–	10	–	2
‡ – 2024 Summit tournament champion + – At-large invitation to the 2024 NCAA tournament ^{#} – Ineligible for post-season (In transition); As of December 17, 2024; Rankings from United Soccer Coaches; Source: Summit

2024 Sun Belt Conference men's soccer standings
	Conf.					Overall
Team	W		L		T	W		L		T
No. 16 West Virginia ‡	5	–	0	–	4	13	–	2	–	7
No. 2 Marshall +	4	–	0	–	5	15	–	2	–	7
UCF	5	–	4	–	0	7	–	6	–	3
Kentucky	4	–	2	–	3	6	–	6	–	6
South Carolina	5	–	4	–	0	10	–	5	–	2
James Madison	3	–	3	–	3	8	–	5	–	6
Old Dominion	3	–	5	–	1	7	–	8	–	2
Georgia Southern	2	–	5	–	2	6	–	7	–	4
Coastal Carolina	1	–	5	–	3	3	–	10	–	3
Georgia State	1	–	5	–	3	4	–	8	–	5
‡ – 2024 Sun Belt Conference tournament champion + – At-large invitation to the 2024 NCAA tournament; As of December 17, 2024; Rankings from United Soccer Coaches; Source: Sun Belt

2024 West Coast Conference men's soccer standings
	Conf.					Overall
Team	W		L		T	W		L		T
No. 10 San Diego †‡	7	–	1	–	0	15	–	3	–	2
San Francisco	5	–	1	–	2	7	–	6	–	4
Oregon State +	5	–	2	–	1	10	–	5	–	3
Portland	4	–	0	–	4	7	–	4	–	7
Loyola Marymount	3	–	4	–	1	6	–	8	–	3
Santa Clara	2	–	4	–	2	5	–	8	–	3
Pacific	2	–	5	–	1	4	–	8	–	4
Saint Mary's (CA)	1	–	4	–	3	2	–	9	–	6
Gonzaga	0	–	8	–	0	6	–	10	–	2
† – Conference champion ‡–Automatic qualifier to NCAA tournament + – At-large invitation to the 2024 NCAA tournament; As of December 17, 2024; Rankings from United Soccer Coaches; Source: WCC

2024 Western Athletic Conference men's soccer standings
	Conf.					Overall
Team	W		L		T	W		L		T
San Diego State	7	–	0	–	1	10	–	5	–	3
Seattle U ‡	7	–	1	–	1	12	–	4	–	3
Cal Baptist	4	–	4	–	1	6	–	8	–	5
Utah Valley	3	–	3	–	2	8	–	6	–	4
San Jose State	3	–	3	–	3	6	–	8	–	7
Utah Tech	3	–	4	–	2	4	–	10	–	4
UNLV	2	–	2	–	5	5	–	7	–	5
UTRGV	2	–	3	–	4	4	–	7	–	5
Grand Canyon	2	–	6	–	1	5	–	10	–	3
Air Force	1	–	8	–	0	1	–	15	–	1
‡ – 2024 WAC tournament Champion + – At-large invitation to the 2024 NCAA tournament; As of November 16, 2024; Rankings from United Soccer Coaches; Source: WAC Due to uneven number of matches played, standings based on points per game.

== Postseason ==
=== Conference winners and tournaments ===
Conference	Regular Season Champion(s)	Tournament Winner	Conference Tournament	Tournament Dates	Tournament Venue (City)
ACC	Pittsburgh	Wake Forest	2024 tournament	November 6–17	First Round and Quarterfinals: Campus sites, hosted by higher seed Semifinals and Final: WakeMed Soccer Park • Cary, North Carolina
America East	Vermont & New Hampshire (Note: Top seed in conference tournament.)	Vermont	2024 tournament	November 9–17	Campus sites, hosted by higher seed
American	Memphis	Charlotte	2024 tournament	November 8–17	Quarterfinals: Campus sites, hosted by higher seed Semifinals and final: Hosted by regular-season champion
ASUN	North Florida & Stetson	North Florida	2024 tournament	November 9–16	Campus sites, hosted by higher seed
Atlantic 10	George Mason	Dayton	2024 tournament	November 8–17	Campus sites, hosted by higher seed
Big East	East – St. John's & Providence	Georgetown	2024 tournament	November 9–17	Quarterfinals: Campus sites, hosted by higher seed Semifinals and final: Maryland SoccerPlex • Boyds, Maryland
Big East	Midwest – Akron	Georgetown	2024 tournament	November 9–17	Quarterfinals: Campus sites, hosted by higher seed Semifinals and final: Maryland SoccerPlex • Boyds, Maryland
Big South	High Point	Gardner-Webb	2024 tournament	November 6–16	Campus sites, hosted by higher seed
Big Ten	Indiana & Ohio State	Ohio State	2024 tournament	November 7–17	SeatGeek Stadium • Bridgeview, Illinois
Big West	Cal Poly	UC Davis	2024 tournament	November 6–15	Campus sites, hosted by higher seed
CAA	Elon	Hofstra	2024 tournament	November 7–16	Quarterfinals and semifinals: Campus sites, hosted by top two seeds Final: Hosted by top remaining seed
Horizon	Oakland	Robert Morris	2024 tournament	November 5–11	Quarterfinals: Campus sites, hosted by higher seed Semifinals and final: Hosted by regular-season champion
Ivy	Penn	Princeton	2024 tournament	November 15–17	Campus sites, hosted by No. 1 seed
MAAC	Rider & Iona	Iona	2024 tournament	November 10–17	Campus sites, hosted by higher seed
Missouri Valley	Missouri State	Evansville	2024 tournament	November 10–16	Quarterfinals: Campus sites, hosted by higher seed Semifinals and final: Hosted by regular-season champion
Northeast	Mercyhurst	LIU	2024 tournament	November 14–17	Campus sites, hosted by higher seed
OVC	SIU Edwardsville	SIU Edwardsville	2024 tournament	November 10–16	Ralph Korte Stadium • Edwardsville, Illinois
Patriot	Bucknell & Boston University	Bucknell	2024 tournament	November 9–16	Campus sites, hosted by higher seed
SoCon	East Tennessee State & UNC Greensboro	Furman	2024 tournament	November 8–17	Quarterfinals and semifinals: Campus sites, hosted by top two seeds Final: Hosted by top remaining seed
The Summit	Denver	Kansas City	2024 tournament	November 16	University of Denver Soccer Stadium • Denver, Colorado
Sun Belt	West Virginia	West Virginia	2024 tournament	November 10–17	Quarterfinals and semifinals: Campus sites, hosted by top two seeds Final: Hosted by top remaining seed
WAC	Seattle U & San Diego State	Seattle U	2024 tournament	November 10–16	GCU Stadium • Phoenix, Arizona
WCC	San Diego		No tournament		

== Awards and honors ==
=== Major player of the year awards ===
- Hermann Trophy: Michael Adedokun, Ohio State
- TopDrawerSoccer.com National Player of the Year Award: Sam Bassett, Denver

=== Other major awards ===
- United Soccer Coaches College Coach of the Year: Brian Maisonneuve, Ohio State
- NCAA Tournament MVP: Maximilian Kissel (Offensive) Niklas Herceg (Defensive)

=== Conference players and coaches of the year ===
Conference	Conference Player of the Year	Offensive Player of the Year (Note: Honorees are forwards unless otherwise indicated.)	Defensive Player of the Year (Note: Honorees are defenders unless otherwise indicated.)	Midfielder of the Year	Goalkeeper of the Year	Rookie of the Year	Coach of the Year
ACC	—N/a	Matthew Roou, Notre Dame	Casper Svendby, Pittsburgh	Joran Gerbet, Clemson	Wessel Speel, Duke	Ransford Gyan, M, Clemson (Note: This conference's award is "Freshman of the Year" and restricted to players of that classification.)	Jay Vidovich, Pittsburgh
America East	—N/a	Matthew Goncalves, New Hampshire (Note: This conference's award is styled as "Striker of the Year".)	Zach Barrett, Vermont (Note: This conference's award is styled as "Defender of the Year".)	Sydney Wathuta, Vermont	Erik Lauta, New Hampshire	Max Voigt, DF, New Hampshire	Vermont (head coach: Rob Dow) (Note: The top coaching award in this conference is styled as "Coaching Staff of the Year" and presented to an entire staff, although the head coach is personally cited in the award announcement. The American Athletic Conference and Missouri Valley Conference cite each member of the winning staff individually.)
American	—N/a	Mamadou Diarra, Florida Atlantic	Jackson Kim, Memphis	Lleyton Imparato, Memphis & Pedro Faife, USF	Filip Sabatti, Memphis	Mathis Richter, DF, UAB & David Houja, DF, FIU	Memphis (head coach: Richard Mulrooney)
ASUN	Charles Ahl, MF, Stetson	—N/a	Clarence Loriot, Stetson	—N/a	Nicolo Radaelli, Stetson	Dan Karsten, F, Lipscomb	Jamie Davies, North Florida
Atlantic 10	—N/a	Alec Hughes, UMass	Hjalti Sigurdsson, Dayton	Daniel D'Ippolito, Fordham	Jeremi Abonnel, Saint Louis	Andrew Armstrong, F, Dayton	Rich Costanzo, George Mason
Big East	—N/a	Emil Jaaskelainen, Akron	Beto Ydrach, Akron	Noeh Hernandez], DePaul	Mitchell Budler, Akron	Tate Lampman, DF, Georgetown	Akron (head coach: Jared Embick)
Big Ten	—N/a	Tommy Mihalic, Indiana	William Kulvik, Maryland	Michael Adedokun, Ohio State	Zac Kelly, Michigan State	Dean Boltz, F, Wisconsin	Brian Maisonneuve, Ohio State
Big South	—N/a	Damorney Hutchinson, F, Presbyterian	Jefferson Amaya, High Point	Brendan Krueger, High Point	Charlie Farrar, UNC Asheville	Freshman: Frankie DeFrancesco, F, High Point; Newcomer: Ross Johnstone, MF, High Point (Note: This conference presents separate awards for Freshman of the Year and Newcomer of the Year. The latter is open to any player in his first season of conference competition, regardless of academic classification.)	Zach Haines, High Point
Big West	—N/a	Alexis Ledoux, UC Santa Barbara	Parker Owens, Cal Poly	Errick Serrano, Cal State Fullerton	Nicky McCune, Cal Poly	Quinn Mahoney, F, Cal Poly	Oige Kennedy, Cal Poly
CAA	Scott Vatne, MF, Elon	—N/a	Gabe Dahlin, Monmouth	Leonardo D’Ambrosio, Charleston & Patrick Short, Drexel	—N/a	Marius Stenner, F, Delaware	Marc Reeves, Elon
Horizon	Bojan Kolevski, F, Cleveland State	Cole Werthmuller, Wright State	So Nishikawa, Green Bay	—N/a	Alex Flowers, Oakland	Matteo Correia, F, Cleveland State	Paul Doroh, Oakland
Ivy	—N/a	Alex Harris, Cornell & Stas Korzeniowski, Penn	Leo Burney, Penn	—N/a	—N/a	Aidan Martin, DF, Cornell	Penn (head coach: Brian Gill)
MAAC	—N/a	Momo Diop, Rider (Note: The MAAC's award in this category is styled as "Golden Boot".)	Tim Timchenko, Iona	—N/a	Adam Salama, Rider (Note: The MAAC's award in this category is styled as "Golden Glove".)	Dren Dobruna, DF, Siena	Chad Duernberger, Rider
Missouri Valley	Jesús Barea, F, Missouri State	Jesús Barea, Missouri State (Note: This conference's award is styled as "Forward of the Year".)	Kyle Cusimano, Bowling Green	Eskil Gjerde, Drake & Tyler Caton, Missouri State	Colin Welsh, Western Michigan	Preston Kipnusu, F, Drake	Western Michigan (head coach: Chad Wiseman)
Northeast	Dylan Sumner, MF, Mercyhurst	—N/a	Jack Goodrich, Le Moyne	—N/a	Eoin Gawronski, LIU	Stephane Njike, F, LIU	Mercyhurst (head coach: Austin Solomon)
OVC	—N/a	Michael Huss, Liberty	Sam Zeeman, Houston Christian	Yasha Schaerer, SIUE	Rob Gjelaj, SIUE	Morgan Worsfold-Gregg, MF, Houston Christian	Cale Wassermann, SIUE
Patriot	—N/a	Troy Elgersma, American	Quin DeLaMater, Boston University	Diego Rived, Boston University	Fred Lapworth, Boston University	Blake Pipkin, F, Colgate	Dave Brandt, Bucknell
SoCon	Yoshiya Okawa, MF, UNCG	—N/a	—N/a	—N/a	Aaron Salinas, Furman	Issah Haruna, MF, UNCG	Allen Vital, ETSU
Summit	—N/a	Elie Kisoka, Kansas City	Ronan Wynne, Denver	Sam Bassett, Denver	Isaac Nehme, Denver	Elie Kisoka, F, Kansas City	Ryan Pore, Kansas City
Sun Belt	Sergio Ors Navarro, F, West Virginia	Sergio Ors Navarro, West Virginia	Luca Nikolai, James Madison	—N/a	Sebastian Conlon, James Madison	Freshman: Harvey Sarajian, MF, Georgia Southern; Newcomer: Ryan Holmes, F, Georgia Southern	Daniel Stratford, West Virginia
WAC	—N/a	Angel Iniguez, San Jose State	Demian Alvarez, Seattle U	—N/a	Djibril Doumbia, San Diego State	Edgar Leon, MF, Seattle U	Ryan Hopkins, San Diego State
WCC	—N/a	Sergi Solans, F, Oregon State	Reid Roberts, San Francisco	Arnau Farnos, Oregon State	Donovan Parisian, San Diego	Sergi Solans, F, Oregon State	Brian Quinn, San Diego
