= 2024 Sun Belt Conference men's soccer season =

- League: NCAA Division I
- Sport: Soccer
- Duration: August 22, 2024 - November 10, 2024
- Teams: 10

2025 MLS SuperDraft
- Top draft pick: Ryan Baer
- Picked by: Seattle Sounders FC

Regular Season
- West Virginia: West Virginia
- Runners-up: Marshall

Tournament
- Champions: West Virginia
- Runners-up: Marshall

Sun Belt Conference men's soccer seasons
- ← 2023 2025 →

2024 Sun Belt Conference men's soccer standings
	Conf.					Overall
Team	W		L		T	W		L		T
No. 16 West Virginia ‡	5	–	0	–	4	13	–	2	–	7
No. 2 Marshall +	4	–	0	–	5	15	–	2	–	7
UCF	5	–	4	–	0	7	–	6	–	3
Kentucky	4	–	2	–	3	6	–	6	–	6
South Carolina	5	–	4	–	0	10	–	5	–	2
James Madison	3	–	3	–	3	8	–	5	–	6
Old Dominion	3	–	5	–	1	7	–	8	–	2
Georgia Southern	2	–	5	–	2	6	–	7	–	4
Coastal Carolina	1	–	5	–	3	3	–	10	–	3
Georgia State	1	–	5	–	3	4	–	8	–	5
‡ – 2024 Sun Belt Conference tournament champion + – At-large invitation to the 2024 NCAA tournament; As of December 17, 2024; Rankings from United Soccer Coaches; Source: Sun Belt

The 2024 Sun Belt Conference men's soccer season was the 22nd season of men's varsity soccer in the Sun Belt Conference (SBC), as part of the 2024 NCAA Division I men's soccer season.

== Previous season ==
Marshall won both the Sun Belt Conference regular season and tournament championship. West Virginia would make it to the College College Cup, losing in the semifinals to National Champions Clemson.

== Teams ==
=== Stadiums and locations ===
Team	Location	Stadium	Capacity
Coastal Carolina Chanticleers	Conway, South Carolina	CCU Soccer Complex	1,000
Georgia Southern Eagles	Statesboro, Georgia	Eagle Field	3,500
Georgia State Panthers	Decatur, Georgia	GSU Soccer Complex	1,892
James Madison Dukes	Harrisonburg, Virginia	Sentara Park	1,500
Kentucky Wildcats	Lexington, Kentucky	Wendell & Vickie Bell Soccer Complex	3,368
Marshall Thundering Herd	Huntington, West Virginia	Veterans Memorial Soccer Complex	1,006
Old Dominion Monarchs	Norfolk, Virginia	Old Dominion Soccer Complex	4,000
South Carolina Gamecocks	Columbia, South Carolina	Stone Stadium	5,700
UCF Knights	Orlando, Florida	UCF Soccer and Track Stadium	2,000
West Virginia Mountaineers	Morgantown, West Virginia	Dick Dlesk Soccer Stadium	1,600

=== Coaches ===
Tennant McVea was hired in November 2023 to become the Head Coach of the Old Dominion Monarchs following the retirement of Alan Dawson. Note: All stats current through the completion of the 2023 season

Team	Head coach	Previous job	Years at school	Overall record	Record at school	SBC record	Ref.
Coastal Carolina	Shaun Docking	Charleston Southern	27	329–176–55 (.637)	309–157–53 (.646)	20–14–8 (.571)	
Georgia Southern	Lee Squires	Lander	1	142–65–32 (.661)	2–9–6 (.294)	1–5–3 (.278)	
Georgia State	Brett Surrency	Georgia State (asst.)	15	141–99–21 (.580)	141–99–21 (.580)	28–17–7 (.606)	
James Madison	Paul Zazenski	James Madison (asst.)	7	130–54–23 (.684)	60–31–19 (.632)	6–5–6 (.529)	
Kentucky	Johan Cedergren	Dartmouth (asst.)	13	141–64–42 (.656)	141–64–42 (.656)	8–3–6 (.647)	
Marshall	Chris Grassie	Charleston (WV)	8	184–55–26 (.743)	85–35–18 (.681)	11–3–3 (.735)	
Old Dominion	Tennant McVea	Old Dominion (asst.)	0	– (–)	– (–)	– (–)	
South Carolina	Tony Annan	Atlanta United Academy	4	16–26–9 (.402)	16–26–9 (.402)	4–8–5 (.382)	
UCF	Scott Calabrese	FIU	7	139–91–28 (.593)	54–24–8 (.674)	6–2–1 (.722)	
West Virginia	Dan Stratford	Charleston (WV)	4	86–17–16 (.790)	25–13–11 (.622)	8–2–7 (.676)	

== Preseason ==
=== Preseason poll ===
The preseason poll was released in August 2024.

SBC preseason poll
Predicted finish	Team	Votes (1st place)
1	Marshall	138 (8)
2	West Virginia	132 (2)
3	UCF	111
4	Kentucky	108
5	James Madison	106
6	South Carolina	83
7	Georgia State	80
8	Old Dominion	70
6T	Coastal Carolina	62
10	Georgia Southern	60

=== Preseason national polls ===
The preseason national polls were released in August 2024.

	United; Soccer	Top Drawer; Soccer
Coastal Carolina	—	
Georgia Southern	—	
Georgia State	—	
James Madison	18	
Kentucky	—	
Marshall	8	
Old Dominion	—	
South Carolina	—	
UCF	19	
West Virginia	3	

== Regular season ==
=== National rankings ===
	Improvement in ranking
	Drop in ranking
NR	Not Ranked

		Pre	Wk 1	Wk 2	Wk 3	Wk 4	Wk 5	Wk 6	Wk 7	Wk 8	Wk 9	Wk 10	Wk 11	Wk 12	Wk 13	Wk 14	Wk 15	Final
Coastal Carolina	USC	NR	NR	NR	NR	NR	NR	NR	NR	NR	NR	NR	NR	None released				NR
Coastal Carolina	TDS																	
Georgia Southern	USC	NR												None released				
Georgia Southern	TDS																	
Georgia State	USC	NR												None released				
Georgia State	TDS																	
James Madison	USC	18												None released				
James Madison	TDS																	
Kentucky	USC	NR												None released				
Kentucky	TDS																	
Marshall	USC	8	2	7	6	10	7	5	6	3	4	6	8	None released				2
Marshall	TDS																	
Old Dominion	USC	NR												None released				
Old Dominion	TDS																	
South Carolina	USC	NR												None released				
South Carolina	TDS																	
UCF	USC	19												None released				
UCF	TDS																	
West Virginia	USC	3												None released				
West Virginia	TDS																	

== MLS SuperDraft ==
The 2024 MLS SuperDraft was held on December 20, 2024.

=== Total picks by school ===
Team	Round 1	Round 2	Round 3	Total
Coastal Carolina	0	0	0	0
Georgia State	0	0	0	0
Georgia Southern	0	0	0	0
James Madison	0	0	0	0
Kentucky	0	1	0	1
Marshall	1	0	2	3
Old Dominion	0	0	0	0
South Carolina	0	0	2	2
UCF	0	0	0	0
West Virginia	1	0	0	1

=== List of selections ===
Round	Pick #	MLS team	Player	Position	College	Nationality	Ref.
1	28	Seattle Sounders FC	Ryan Baer	MF	West Virginia	(United States)	
1	29	Real Salt Lake	Lineker Rodrigues dos Santos	FW	Marshall	(Brazil)	
2	55	Minnesota United FC	Logan Dorsey	FW	Kentucky	(United States)	
3	66	Nashville SC	Ethan Ballek	MF	South Carolina	(United States)	
3	70	D.C. United	Jonah Biggar	DF	South Carolina	(United States)	
3	87	Orlando City SC	Takahiro Fujita	DF	Marshall	(Japan)	
3	89	Real Salt Lake	Aleksandar Vuković	DF	Marshall	(Serbia)	
