= 2024 Sun Belt Conference men's soccer tournament =

American college soccer postseason tournament

- Classification: Division I
- Teams: 8
- Matches: 7
- Site: Morgantown, WV; Huntington, WV
- Champions: West Virginia (1st title)
- Winning coach: Dan Stratford (1st title)
- MVP: Sergio Ors Navarro (West Virginia)
- Broadcast: ESPN+

2024 Sun Belt Conference men's soccer standings
	Conf.					Overall
Team	W		L		T	W		L		T
No. 16 West Virginia ‡	5	–	0	–	4	13	–	2	–	7
No. 2 Marshall +	4	–	0	–	5	15	–	2	–	7
UCF	5	–	4	–	0	7	–	6	–	3
Kentucky	4	–	2	–	3	6	–	6	–	6
South Carolina	5	–	4	–	0	10	–	5	–	2
James Madison	3	–	3	–	3	8	–	5	–	6
Old Dominion	3	–	5	–	1	7	–	8	–	2
Georgia Southern	2	–	5	–	2	6	–	7	–	4
Coastal Carolina	1	–	5	–	3	3	–	10	–	3
Georgia State	1	–	5	–	3	4	–	8	–	5
‡ – 2024 Sun Belt Conference tournament champion + – At-large invitation to the 2024 NCAA tournament; As of December 17, 2024; Rankings from United Soccer Coaches; Source: Sun Belt

The 2024 Sun Belt Conference men's soccer tournament was the 29th edition of the Sun Belt Conference men's soccer tournament. The tournament ran from November 10 to November 17, 2024. West Virginia won the Sun Belt Conference (SBC) tournament and with it the SBC's automatic bid to the NCAA Division I National Tournament.

The conference announced the top two seeds would host the quarterfinals and semifinal rounds, and then the highest remaining seed in the finals would host the finals. #1 seed Marshall and #2 seed UCF earned the right to host the first two rounds of the tournament.

== Seeds ==
Seed	School	Conference	Points
1	West Virginia	5–0–4	19
2	Marshall	4–0–5	17
3	UCF	5–4	15
4	Kentucky	4–2–3	15
5	South Carolina	5–4	15
6	James Madison	3–3–3	12
7	Old Dominion	3–5–1	10
8	Georgia Southern	2–5–2	8

== Bracket ==
Quarterfinals
1	West Virginia	3
8	Georgia Southern	2
4	Kentucky	1
5	South Carolina	0
2	Marshall	3
7	Old Dominion	2
3	UCF	1
6	James Madison	2

Semifinals
West Virginia	2
Kentucky	1
Marshall	1
James Madison	0

Finals
West Virginia (p)	0(6)
Marshall	0(5)

== Schedule ==
=== Quarterfinals ===
November 10, 2024
3:00 PM EST

#1 West Virginia Mountaineers	3–2	#8 Georgia Southern Eagles
Marcus Caldeira 44'; Carlos Hernando 61'; Sergio Ors Navarro 81'	Report	Zachary Martin 35', 36'

Dick Dlesk Soccer Stadium, Morgantown, WV
Attendance: 843
Referee: Kevin Fikar

November 10, 2024
3:00 PM EST

#4 Kentucky Wildcats	1–0	#5 South Carolina Gamecocks
Logan Dorsey 63' (pen.)	Report

Dick Dlesk Soccer Stadium, Morgantown, WV
Attendance: 863
Referee: Michael Nickerson

November 10, 2024
7:00 PM EST

#2 Marshall Thundering Herd	3–2	#7 Old Dominion Monarchs
Pablo Simon 74'; João Roberto 77'; Rai Pinto 86'	Report	Noah Madrigal 34'; Evan Watt 87'

Hoops Family Field, Huntington, WV
Attendance: 1811
Referee: David Erbacher

November 10, 2024
7:00 PM EST

#3 UCF Knights	1–2	#6 James Madison Dukes
Javier López Sánchez 78'	Report	Evan Southern 64'; Kevin Larsson 73'

Hoops Family Field, Huntington, WV
Attendance: 75
Referee: Noah Matos

=== Semifinals ===
November 13, 2024
7:00 PM EDT

#1 West Virginia Mountaineers	2–1	#4 Kentucky Wildcats
Sergio Ors Navarro 4'; Carlos Hernando 53'	Report	Logan Dorsey 2'

Dick Dlesk Soccer Stadium, Morgantown, WV
Attendance: 1210
Referee: Mario Maric

November 13, 2024
7:00 PM EDT

#2 Marshall Thundering Herd	1–0	#6 James Madison Dukes
Lineker Rodrigues dos Santos 35'	Report

Hoops Family Field, Huntington, WV
Attendance: 2020
Referee: Amin Hadzic

=== Final ===
November 17, 2024
1:00 PM EDT

#1 West Virginia Mountaineers	0-0 (a.e.t.)	#2 Marshall Thundering Herd
	Report
Penalties
Sergio Ors Navarro (penalty scored); Carlos Hernando (penalty scored); Marcus Caldeira (penalty scored); Dante Huckaby (penalty scored); Frederik Jorgensen (penalty scored); Dyon Dromers (penalty scored)	6–5	(penalty scored) Alexander Stjernegaard; (penalty scored) Taimu Okiyoshi; (penalty scored) Pablo Simon; (penalty scored) Aymane Sordo; (penalty scored) Haruhi Taneda; (penalty missed) João Roberto

Dick Dlesk Soccer Stadium, Morgantown, WV
Attendance: 3162
Referee: Nickrod Fateh

== Honors ==
=== All-Tournament Team ===
The following were recognized by the Sun Belt Conference as the All-Tournament Team.

Position	Player	School
F	Logan Dorsey	Kentucky
F	Lucca Dourado	UCF
F	Sergio Ors Navarro	West Virginia
F	Lineker Rodrigues dos Santos	Marshall
M	Ryan Baer	West Virginia
M	Taimu Okiyoshi	Marshall
M	Harvey Sarajian	Georiga Southern
D	Max Broughton	West Virginia
D	Luca Nikolai	James Madison
D	Anderson Rosa	UCF
GK	Sebastian Conlon	James Madison
