= 2024 America East men's soccer tournament =

- Classification: Division I
- Teams: 6
- Matches: 5
- Attendance: 6,146
- Site: Campus Sites (Higher Seed)
- Champions: Vermont (7th title)
- Winning coach: Rob Dow (2nd title)
- MVP: Zach Barrett (Vermont)
- Broadcast: ESPN+

2024 America East Conference men's soccer standings
	Conf.					Overall
Team	W		L		T	W		L		T
New Hampshire	4	–	1	–	2	7	–	3	–	7
No. 1 Vermont ‡	4	–	1	–	2	16	–	2	–	6
UMBC	4	–	2	–	1	8	–	7	–	4
Bryant	4	–	3	–	0	11	–	5	–	4
NJIT	2	–	3	–	2	6	–	8	–	4
Binghamton	2	–	3	–	2	8	–	7	–	4
UMass Lowell	1	–	4	–	2	6	–	5	–	5
Albany	1	–	5	–	1	4	–	12	–	2
‡ – AEC tournament champion + – At-large invitation to the 2024 NCAA tournament; As of December 17, 2024; Rankings from United Soccer Coaches; Source: America East

The 2024 America East Conference men's soccer tournament was the postseason men's soccer tournament for the America East Conference held from November 9 through November 17, 2024. The five-match tournament took place at campus sites, with the higher seed hosting. The six-team single-elimination tournament consisted of three rounds based on seeding from regular season conference play. The defending champions were the Bryant Bulldogs, who were unable to defend their title. Bryant qualified for the Final but lost to Vermont 2–1. It was the seventh America East tournament victory for the Vermont Catamounts soccer program, and second for Head Coach Rob Dow. As tournament champions, Vermont earned the America East's automatic berth into the 2024 NCAA Division I men's soccer tournament.

== Seeding ==
The top six teams in the regular season earned a spot in the tournament, with the top two seeds receiving byes into the Semifinals. A tiebreaker was required to determine the first and second seeds as New Hampshire and Vermont finished the regular season with identical 4–1–2 records. The two teams drew their regular season match 1–1 on September 28. Record against the next highest seed was the next tiebreaker. New Hampshire defeated UMBC 2–1 while Vermont lost to UMBC 1–0. Therefore, New Hampshire was the top seed. Another tiebreaker was required to determine the fifth and sixth seeds as Binghamton and NJIT finished tied with 2–3–2 regular season records. NJIT won the regular season match between the two teams on October 5, 2–1 and therefore was the fifth seed.

Seed	School	Conference Record	Points
1	New Hampshire	4–1–2	14
2	Vermont	4–1–2	14
3	UMBC	4–2–1	13
4	Bryant	4–3–0	12
5	NJIT	2–3–2	8
6	Binghamton	2–3–2	8

== Bracket ==
Quarterfinals; Saturday, Nov. 9
4	Bryant	4
5	NJIT	0
3	UMBC	1
6	Binghamton	0

Semifinals; Wednesday, Nov. 13
1	New Hampshire	0 (2)
4	Bryant (pen.)	0 (4)
2	Vermont (a.e.t)	2
3	UMBC	1

Final; Sunday, Nov. 7
4	Bryant	1
2	Vermont	2

== Schedule ==
=== Quarterfinals ===
November 9, 2024	#4 Bryant	4–0	#5 NJIT	Smithfield, RI
6:00 p.m. EST	Marc Pitarch Bayot 48', 53'; Ramon Camejo (yellow card) 53'; Abdel Talabi (yellow card) 53'; Santiago Blasco Gomez 65'; Sam White 75'; Jonah Stekly (yellow card) 89'	Report	(yellow card) 54' Guy Panzner; (yellow card) 90' Jake Rubis; (yellow card) 90' Matt Moran	Stadium: Beirne Stadium; Attendance: 500

November 9, 2024	#3 UMBC	1–0	#6 Binghamton	Baltimore, MD
7:00 p.m. EST	Giuseppe Indelicato (yellow card) 15'; Adamo Pantaleo (yellow card) 51'; Hans Nesheim 84'	Report	(yellow card) 26' Cailen Thomas; (yellow card) 65' Mael Lopes; (yellow card) 67' Charlie Kaldor; (yellow card) 75' Gaven Egan	Stadium: Retriever Soccer Park; Attendance: 1,175; Referee: Nathaniel Hirschman; Assistant referees: Max Elsasser; Michaela Kelley-Dunn; Fourth official: Peter Dhima

=== Semifinals ===
November 13, 2024	#1 New Hampshire	0–0 (a.e.t.) (2–4 p)	#4 Bryant	Durham, NH
6:00 p.m. EST	Ibrahim Conde (yellow card) 63'; Matteo Brossel (yellow card) 87'; Federico Tellez (yellow card) 110'	Report	(yellow card) 95' Daniel Pereira; (yellow card) 110' Filippo Censini	Stadium: Wildcat Stadium; Attendance: 743; Referee: Adam Kilpatrick; Assistant referees: John Luk; Nicola Vesia; Fourth official: Scott Pereira
	Penalties
	Ibrahim Conde (penalty scored); Matthew Goncalves (penalty missed); Federico Tellez (penalty missed); Terry Makedika (penalty scored)		(penalty scored) Kerman Sukia; (penalty missed) Cristian Guirado; (penalty scored) Jonas Lyshoj; (penalty scored) Marc Bayot; (penalty scored) Jacobs Bryant

November 13, 2024	#2 Vermont	2–1 (a.e.t.)	#3 UMBC	Burlington, VT
6:00 p.m. EST	Adrian Schulze Solano (yellow card) 22'; Yaniv Bazini 77', 106'; David Ismail (yellow card) 82'; Max Murray (yellow card) 106'	Report	(yellow card) 32' Jojo Ocran; 43' Loc San; (yellow card) 82' Tyquan Stroud	Stadium: Virtue Field; Attendance: 1,328; Referee: Victor Borges; Assistant referees: Victor Matheson; John Jordan; Fourth official: Jeremiah Vallieres

=== Final ===
November 17, 2024	#2 Vermont	2–1	#4 Bryant	Burlington, VT
1:00 p.m. EST	Adrian Schulze Solano (yellow card) 27'; Marcell Papp 69'; Maximilian Kissel 86'; Andrew Millar (yellow card) 90'	Report	(yellow card) 65' Jose Alves Faria; 82' Marc Pitarch Bayot	Stadium: Virtue Field; Attendance: 2,400; Referee: Cedric Cook; Assistant referees: Miguel Lara; Matt Stein; Fourth official: Mark Paquette

== Statistics ==
=== Goalscorers ===
There were 11 goals scored in 5 matches, for an average of 2.2 goals per match (as of November 17, 2024).

3 goals

- Marc Pitarch Bayot – Bryant

2 goals

- Yaniv Bazini – Vermont

1 goal

- Santiago Blasco Gomez – Bryant
- Maximilian Kissel – Vermont
- Hans Nesheim – UMBC
- Marcell Papp – Vermont
- Loc San – UMBC
- Sam White – Bryant

== All-Tournament team ==
Player	Team
Carlo Cavalar	Binghamton
Antreas Hadjigavriel	Bryant
Christian Meritt	Bryant
Sam White	Bryant
Baptiste Gateau	New Hampshire
Aaron Williams Fernandez	New Hampshire
Sergio Martinez Cubel	NJIT
Hans Nesheim	UMBC
Emigdio Tormo Lopez	UMBC
**Zach Barrett**	Vermont
Yaniz Bazini	Vermont
Niklas Herceg	Vermont
Adrian Shulze-Solano	Vermont

MVP in bold
