= 2024 American Athletic Conference men's soccer tournament =

- Classification: Division I
- Teams: 6
- Matches: 5
- Attendance: 2,589
- First round site: Top Seed Campus Site
- Semifinals site: Murphy Soccer Complex; Memphis, Tennessee
- Finals site: Murphy Soccer Complex; Memphis, Tennessee
- Champions: Charlotte (2nd title)
- Winning coach: Kevin Langan (2nd title)
- MVP: Brighman Larsen (Offensive); Leonard Stritter (Defensive) (Charlotte)
- Broadcast: ESPN+

2024 American Athletic Conference men's soccer standings
	Conf.					Overall
Team	W		L		T	W		L		T
Memphis	4	–	1	–	2	7	–	7	–	3
South Florida	4	–	3	–	0	6	–	6	–	4
Charlotte ‡	3	–	2	–	2	11	–	3	–	5
Florida Atlantic	3	–	3	–	1	7	–	6	–	3
FIU	2	–	2	–	3	6	–	6	–	6
Temple	2	–	2	–	3	5	–	7	–	5
Tulsa	2	–	4	–	1	3	–	9	–	3
UAB	1	–	4	–	2	4	–	6	–	5
‡ – AAC tournament champion + – At-large invitation to the 2024 NCAA tournament; As of December 17, 2024; Rankings from United Soccer Coaches; Source: The American

The 2024 American Athletic Conference men's soccer tournament was the postseason men's soccer tournament for the American Athletic Conference, held November 8 through November 17, 2024. The five-match tournament took place at campus sites, with the higher seed hosting while the Semifinals and Finals were hosted at Westcott Field in Dallas, Texas. The six-team single-elimination tournament consisted of three rounds based on seeding from regular season conference play. The defending champions were the Charlotte 49ers. The 49ers successfully defended their tournament title, defeating the Florida International Panthers in overtime in the Final. This was Charlotte's second American Athletic Conference tournament title and their fourth conference title overall. This was also the second American tournament title for head coach Kevin Langan and his third conference tournament title overall. As tournament champions Charlotte earned the American's automatic berth into the 2024 NCAA Division I men's soccer tournament.

This was the last conference tournament held under the "American Athletic Conference" name. On July 21, 2025, the conference dropped the word "Athletic" from its name, becoming simply the American Conference.

== Seeding ==
The top six teams in the regular season earned a spot in the tournament, with the top two seeds receiving byes into the Semifinals. A tiebreaker was required to determine the fifth and sixth seeds in the tournament as FIU and Temple finished with identical 2–2–3 regular season conference records. The two teams drew their October 26th regular season match up 0–0. After further tiebreakers it was determined that FIU was the fifth seed and Temple was the sixth seed.

Seed	School	Conference Record	Points
1	Memphis	4–1–2	14
2	South Florida	4–3–0	12
3	Charlotte	3–2–2	11
4	Florida Atlantic	3–3–1	10
5	FIU	2–2–3	9
6	Temple	2–2–3	9

== Bracket ==
First Round; November 8
3	Charlotte	3
6	Temple	1
4	Florida Atlantic	0
5	FIU	1

Semifinals; November 14
2	South Florida	0
3	Charlotte	1
1	Memphis	1
5	FIU	3

Championship; November 17
3	Charlotte (a.e.t)	2
5	FIU	1

== Schedule ==
=== Semifinals ===
November 8, 2024	#4 Florida Atlantic	0–1	#5 FIU	Boca Raton, FL
7:00 p.m. EST		Report	11', (yellow card) 63' Eduardo Mustre; (yellow card) 63' Nigel Van Haveren; (yellow card) 75' Thomas Wallis; (yellow card) 75' Joackim Betina; (yellow card) 89' Diego Castillo	Stadium: FAU Soccer Stadium; Attendance: 1,293; Referee: Kevin Maurer; Assistant referees: Meghan Mullen; John Tamayo; Fourth official: Mauro Gonzalez

November 8, 2024	#3 Charlotte	3–1	#6 Temple	Charlotte, NC
7:00 p.m. EST	Abubacarr Fofana 3'; Ryan Dunn 9', 26'; Filip Jauk (yellow card) 43'; Ben Fisher (yellow card) 71'; Chris Dommer (yellow card) 90'	Report	(yellow card) 26' Team; (yellow card) 37' Lukas Egarter; 85' Aaron Markowitz; (yellow card) 88' Nikolai Zapolskikh	Stadium: Transamerica Field; Attendance: 680; Referee: Justin St. Pierre; Assistant referees: Robert Dail; John Rush; Fourth official: Chris Zuerner

=== Semifinals ===
November 14, 2024	#2 South Florida	0–1	#3 Charlotte	Memphis, TN
3:30 p.m. CST	Mathis Haugen (yellow card) 22'; Pedro Faife (yellow card) 72'	Report	(yellow card) 13' Elias Arsvoll; 40' Filip Jauk; (yellow card) 72' Daire McCarthy; (yellow card) 89' Lasse Laursen	Stadium: Murphy Soccer Complex; Attendance: 204; Referee: Elvis Osmanovic; Assistant referees: Jason Guillen; David Blikstad; Fourth official: Donovan Eubank

November 14, 2024	#1 Memphis	1–3	#5 FIU	Memphis, TN
7:00 p.m. CST	Brody Conley (yellow card) 11'; Anders Bordoy 54'; Team (red card) 76'; Cory Pitlik (yellow card) 88' (yellow-red card) 90'	Report	(yellow card) 34' Driss Nasser; 53', 73' (pen.) Eduardo Mustre; 81' Michael Appiah	Stadium: Murphy Soccer Complex; Attendance: 307; Referee: Mo Kaleia; Assistant referees: John Ocampo; AJ Franklin; Fourth official: Melinda Homa

=== Final ===
November 17, 2024	#3 Charlotte	2–1	#5 FIU	Memphis, TN
12:00 p.m. CST	Natsuki Ogata 45'; Lasse Laursen (yellow card) 59'; Jaedon Richardson (yellow card) 87'; Brigham Larsen 100'	Report	5' Mathys Lefebvre; (yellow card) 55' Joackim Betina; (yellow card) 77' Leo Vilchis; (yellow card) 91' Adrian Barosen	Stadium: Murphy Soccer Complex; Attendance: 105; Referee: Austin Saini; Assistant referees: Jason Guillen; John Ocampo; Fourth official: David Blikstad

== Statistics ==
=== Goalscorers ===
There were 13 goals scored in 5 matches, for an average of 2.6 goals per match (as of November 17, 2024).

3 goals

- Eduardo Mustre – FIU

2 goals

- Ryan Dunn – Charlotte

1 goal

- Michael Appiah – FIU
- Anders Bordoy – Memphis
- Abubacarr Fofana – Charlotte
- Filip Jauk – Charlotte
- Brigham Larsen – Charlotte
- Mathys Lefebvre – FIU
- Aaron Markowitz – Temple
- Natsuki Ogata – Charlotte

== All-Tournament team ==
Player	Team
Ryan Dunn	Charlotte
Filip Jauk	Charlotte
**Brighman Larsen**	Charlotte
Lasse Laursen	Charlotte
Leonard Stritter	Charlotte
Michael Appiah	FIU
Joao Domingues	FIU
Eduardo Mustre	FIU
Nigel Van Haveren	FIU
Anders Bordoy	Memphis
Jemone Barclay	South Florida

Offensive MVP in bold
Defensive MVP in italics
