= 2024 SIU Edwardsville Cougars men's soccer team =

American college soccer season

2024 SIU Edwardsville Cougars men's soccer

OVC Season Champions OVC Tournament Champions
- Conference: Ohio Valley Conference
- Head coach: Cale Wassermann (6th season)
- Assistant coaches: Jordan Grant; Jaxsen Wirth; Andy Brennan (GA)
- Home stadium: Ralph Korte Stadium; Capacity, 4,000

2024 Ohio Valley Conference men's soccer standings
| | Conf. | | | | | Overall |
| Team | W | | L | | T | W | | L | | T |
|---|---|---|---|---|---|---|---|---|---|---|
| SIU Edwardsville ‡ | 8 | – | 1 | – | 1 | 12 | – | 5 | – | 3 |
| Lindenwood ^{#} | 6 | – | 2 | – | 2 | 11 | – | 6 | – | 3 |
| Houston Christian | 5 | – | 2 | – | 3 | 8 | – | 7 | – | 5 |
| Liberty | 5 | – | 3 | – | 2 | 7 | – | 7 | – | 3 |
| Incarnate Word | 3 | – | 2 | – | 5 | 6 | – | 6 | – | 6 |
| Western Illinois | 3 | – | 7 | – | 0 | 8 | – | 11 | – | 1 |
| Southern Indiana ^{#} | 1 | – | 7 | – | 2 | 2 | – | 14 | – | 2 |
| Eastern Illinois | 1 | – | 8 | – | 1 | 2 | – | 12 | – | 2 |
‡ – 2024 Ohio Valley tournament champion + – At-large invitation to the 2024 NCAA tournament ^{#} – Ineligible for NCAA tournament (In transition); As of December 17, 2024; Rankings from United Soccer Coaches; Source: OVC

The 2024 SIU Edwardsville Cougars men's soccer team represented Southern Illinois University Edwardsville during the 2024 NCAA Division I men's soccer season, the school's 58th season. The Cougars are coached by Cale Wassermann. The team plays their home games on Bob Guelker Field at the Ralph Korte Stadium as a member of the Ohio Valley Conference (OVC). The Cougars are the defending OVC regular season and tournament champions.

== Preseason ==
The Cougars return thirteen players from 2023 as well as a redshirt. They are joined by five freshmen and eight transfers from other schools. Included in the returners are the Cougars' four top scorers from 2023, Pavel Dashin, Stephan Moreira, Ignacio "Nacho" Abeal Pou, and Jake Karolczak. These four, plus six other returners accounted for 29 goals and 27 assists of last season's total 44 goals and 46 assists.

In August, the OVC head coaches and communications directors voted to pick the preseason favorite to win the OVC Men's Soccer Championship. Teams received 7 points for a first-place votes, 6 for a second-place vote, etc.

2023 OVC Men's Soccer Predicted Order of Finish

1. SIUE (11 first-place votes) – 95 points

2. Liberty (3) – 79

4. Lindenwood – 66

5. HCU (2) – 59

6. Eastern Illinois – 36

7. Western Illinois – 25

8. Southern Indiana – 21

In the TopDrawerSoccer.com Preseason College Soccer National Ranking, the Cougars were ranked #25.

== Regular season ==
In the season opener, the statistics would seem to show the Big Ten's Michigan State Spartans dominating the Cougars by leading 12–4 in shots, 6–3 in shots on goal, and 3–1 on corner kicks, but the final score was a 1–1 draw. Strong defense was the keynote for both teams, as they moved up and down the pitch, with the Cougars reluctant to take the less-than-perfect shot. After a near-thing foul in the box, Sparty scored first on a penalty kick in the 38th minute that was the only thing to get past Rob Gjelaj in his debut as the Cougars' goalkeeper. In the 60th minute, Patrick Coleman sent a perfect pass to Nic Muench that was driven past the MSU keeper to earn the draw.

In the first game of their Wolstein Classic, the Big Ten's 20th ranked Ohio State Buckeyes, the Cougars were pretty much dominated in the first half, and, although the second half was fairly well evenly-played, OSU added two more goals to the two from the first half. With four Buckeyes scoring and three of the four adding assists, the home team outshot the Cougars 17–8 and 10–2 on goal. Although conceding the four goals, Rob Gjelaj made six saves before both sides changed goalkeepers late in the game. Nic Muench led the Cougars with three shots, and Wes Gibson got off two, but it was too little to matter.

Despite Rob Gjelaj turning away a penalty shot in the thirteenth minute, Dayton dominated the Cougars in the second game of Ohio State's Wolstein Classic. The Flyers scored once in the first half and three times in the second, even though Gjelaj made eight saves and Ethan Kornas added two more versus Dayton's onslaught of 31 shots, including 15 on goal. Nacho Abeal took two of SIUE's nine shots.

In front of 6,128 fans, the SIUE Cougars and the 19th ranked St. Louis Billikens met in Downtown West at CityPark in the 41st iteration of the Bronze Boot Game for possession of the Joseph Carenza, Sr. Trophy. The Bills may have won the statistical battle, but the Cougars won the game and took home the Bronze Boot for the second consecutive year. In the 62nd minute, Nacho Abeal was driving toward the goal and was fouled inside the box. Yasha Schaerer converted the penalty kick to give SIUE the 1–0 lead. The Billikens outshot the Cougars 13–4 overall and 4–2 in shots on goal, and they were especially active in the late stages of the game, but Rob Gjelaj made saves on all four potential scores to keep a clean sheet and seal SIUE's first win of the season. The Cougars are now 1–2–1.

The game was rescheduled from Thursday to Friday to miss the heavy weather of Hurricane Francine's aftermath, but the Cougars and the Memphis Tigers still played to a 1–1 draw in a steady rainfall. As has generally been the course this season, SIUE trailed the home team in shots 16–8 and on goal 7–5, but both squads was strong enough on defense to prevent any scoring after the game's first seventeen minutes. In the 13th minute, Nacho Abeal pounced on a ball that was loosed by a midfield slip in the wet pitch and flew toward the goal, driving his shot past the keeper to give the Cougars the lead. Five minutes later, as play resumed following an injury substitution, the home team was scurrying around seemingly before SIUE was ready to resume; the ball ended up in a mad scramble right in front of the net, and a Memphis foot knocked it past Rob Gjelaj, who was unable to make one of his six saves. The rest of the match, it was the Tigers pressing and the Cougars turning them away, then the Cougars pressing before it was the Tigers once more. Nic Meunch led SIUE with two shots on goal. With the draw, the Cougars record is now 1–2–2.

== Postseason ==
The Ohio Valley Conference men's soccer tournament was again held at SIUE's Ralph Korte Stadium. The Cougars defeated Incanate Word 1–0 in the semifinals. They then downed Hoston Christian in the final 2–1 on a "golden goal" in the second extra period to earn the OVC's automatic bid to the NCAA Tournament.

== Honors ==
Following the season opening draw with Michigan State, defender Nic Muench was named the Ohio Valley Conference Offensive Player of the Week for his game-tying goal, and Rob Gjelaj was named the Ohio Valley Conference Goalkkeeper of the Week for allowing only a penalty kick goal while making 5 saves

Nik Muench and Jacob Bilyeu were named to the Wolstein Classic All-Tournament Team.

After the Cougars beat 19th ranked St.Louis U. in the Bronze Boot Game, Wes Gibson was named the Ohio Valley Conference Defensive Player of the Week for his job of captaining the defense, and Rob Gjelaj was named the Ohio Valley Conference Goalkkeeper of the Week for the second time for making four saves and keeping a clean sheet versus SLU.

Following the Memphis game, Rob Gjelaj was named the Ohio Valley Conference Co-Goalkkeeper of the Week, his third award of the season.

Following the opening weekend of OVC play, Nic Muench was named the Ohio Valley Conference Defensive Player of the Week for the second time, and Rob Gjelaj was awarded the Ohio Valley Conference Co-Goalkkeeper of the Week honor, his fourth award of the season.

After scoring a goal and having an assist in the Lindenwood game, sophomore Yasha Schaerer was named the Prairie Farms Cougar of the Week.

Graduate student Wes Gibson was recognized as the Ohio Valley Conference Defensive Player of the Week after helping SIUE to a pair of shutout wins over Eastern Illinois and Southern Indiana. It was Gibson's second award of the season.

Following a week that saw SIUE men's soccer move to 5–0 in Ohio Valley Conference play, Ignacio "Nacho" Abeal was named the Ohio Valley Conference Offensive Player of the Week, and Rob Gjelaj was designated the Ohio Valley Conference Goalkkeeper of the Week for the fifth time.

For his consistently solid play, and especially for his goal from more than 70 yards away versus Liberty, Carles Zomeno was named the Prairie Farms Cougar of the Week.

Graduate student forward Jacob Bilyeu was named as the newest recipient of the Cougars' prestigious Jack Blake Award.

For the third time this season, senior Nic Muench earned the Ohio Valley Conference Offensive Player of the Week award after leading SIUE to a 3–0 win on Senior Day.

For his performance in SIUE's 3–0 win over Western Illinois on Senior Day, Jacobo Sanfeliu was named the Prairie Farms Cougar of the Week.

For the sixth time of the season, Rob Gjelaj was selected as the Ohio Valley Conference Goalkeeper of the Week after wins at Southern Indiana and Eastern Illinois.

After winning a second consecutive Ohio Valley Conference Regular Season title, SIUE men's soccer was awarded with three major postseason awards and a total of seven selections to All-OVC teams. Rob Gjelaj was selected as the Ohio Valley Conference Goalkeeper of the Year. Yasha Schaerer was named Ohio Valley Conference Midfielder of the Year. For the second straight season, Head Coach Cale Wassermann was tabbed as the Ohio Valley Conference Coach of the Year. Nic Muench joined Gjelaj and Scharerer on the All-OVC First Team. "Nacho" Abeal, "Wes" Gibson, and Jacobo Sanfeliu were named to the All-OVC Second Team. Gjelaj, Schaerer, and Jacobo Sanfeliu were all named to the OVC All-Newcomer Team.

The Cougars won their second consecutive OVC Tournament championship title, and Wes Gibson, Yasha Schaerer, Pavel Dashin, and Nic Muench were named to the All-Tournament Team. Additionally, Nic Muench was proclaimed the Most Valuable Player.

== Coaches ==
Hired just in time to lead the Cougars through the COVID-19 pandemic, Cale Wassermann is in his sixth season as SIUE's eighth head coach. His record through five years is 40–30–11. He and his assistants were named the 2023 NCAA North Region Coaching Staff of the Year.

Jordan Grant is in his third season as a Cougars' assistant coach.

Jaxsen Wirth is in his second season as a Cougars' assistant coach, having joined the Cougars as an assistant and goalkeepers coach just before the 2023 season opened.

== Roster ==
Source=

Buff background indicates returning players from 2023. Pink background indicates players "redshirted" in 2023.

| # | Name | Nationality | Height | Weight | Class | Hometown | High School | Academy/Club | Transfer from |
Goalkeepers
| 1 | Rob Gjelaj | (United States) | 6'2" | 185 | Graduate Student | Bruce Township, Michigan | Romeo | | Northwood |
| 29 | Ethan Kornas | (United States) | 5'11" | 150 | Redshirt Sophomore | Huntley, Illinois | Huntley | Eclipse Select SC | |
| 31 | Patrick O'Day | (United States) | 6'2" | 180 | Junior | O'Fallon, Missouri | Liberty | | Lewis and Clark |
Defenders
| 3 | Elliott Forestier | (Australia) | 5'11" | 175 | Junior | Sydney, Australia | Sydney Secondary College | Sydney Olympic FC | Oklahoma Christian |
| 4 | Wes Gibson* | (United States) | 6'1" | 180 | Graduate Student | Morton, Illinois | Morton | Central Illinois United | |
| 5 | Archie McDonnell | (England) | 6'4" | 187 | Redshirt Freshman | Leeds, England | St Mary's Menston | UFCA and Horsforth St. Margaret's | |
| 12 | Enrique Ezquerro | (Spain) | 6'1" | 177 | Junior | Pradejon, Spain | Valle del Cidacos | Pradejon | WVU Tech |
| 13 | Patrick Coleman | (United States) | 5'11" | 160 | Graduate Student | Antioch, Illinois | Antioch | Chicago Magic Academy & FC United PDL Academy | Northern Illinois |
| 15 | Bobby Pauly | (United States) | 6' | 165 | Sophomore | St. Charles, Missouri | Orchard Farm | St. Louis Scott Gallagher | |
| 19 | Nic Muench | (Germany) | 6'1" | 167 | Senior | Heidelberg, Germany | Gymnasium Englisches Insutiut | | Mercyhurst |
| 25 | Anton Mosley (redshirt) | (United States) | 6'1" | 180 | Freshman | Shiloh, Illinois | Belleville-East | St. Louis Scott Gallagher | |
| 27 | Garrison Hill | (United States) | 6'2" | 175 | Redshirt Sophomore | Kansas City, Missouri | The Pembroke Hill School | Sporting Blue Valley SC | |
| 28 | Colin Bastianoni | (United States) | 6' | 170 | Redshirt Sophomore | Naperville, Illinois | Metea Valley | Eclipse SC | |
Midfielders
| 2 | Brian Franco | (United States) | 5'7" | 145 | Freshman | Omaha, Nebraska | Omaha South | St. Louis City 2 | |
| 6 | Carles Zomeno | (Spain) | 6' | 160 | Junior | Valencia, Spain | | | Salt Lake CC |
| 8 | Yasha Schaerer | (Switzerland) | 5'8" | 160 | Sophomore | Langnau am Albis, Switzerland | United School of Sports | Swiss 1.Liga Group 3 | Mid-America Christian |
| 11 | Stephan Moreira | (England) | 5'10" | 15 | Senior | Colchester, England | | Aldershot Town FC | Bryan College |
| 14 | Zach Renz | (United States) | 5'10" | 165 | Redshirt Sophomore | Wentzville, Missouri | Timberland | St. Louis Scott Gallagher Elite | |
| 18 | Ben Perkins (redshirt) | (United States) | 6'2" | 165 | Freshman | Affton, Missouri | St. John Vianney | St. Louis Scott Gallagher | |
| 22 | Jake Karolczak | (United States) | 5'10" | 175 | Redshirt Junior | St. Charles, Missouri | St. Dominic | | |
| 24 | Karson Gibbs | (United States) | 5'10" | 160 | Junior | St. Charles, Missouri | Fort Zumwalt South | St. Louis City 2 | St. Louis |
| 26 | Tyler Sargent (redshirt) | (United States) | 5'10" | 145 | Freshman | Oakville, Missouri | Whitfield School | St. Louis City | |
Forwards
| 7 | Jacobo Sanfeliu | (Spain) | 6'1" | 190 | Senior | Barcelona, Spain | | FC Martinec | Sterling College |
| 9 | Pavel Dashin | (Russia) | 6'2" | 185 | Graduate Student | Krasnodar, Russia | | FC Krasnodar | Reinhardt |
| 10 | Ignacio Abeal Pou* | (Spain) | 5'9" | 160 | Senior | A Coruña, Spain | | | Jefferson College |
| 17 | Jacob Bilyeu | (United States) | 6'2" | 155 | Graduate Student | Oakville, Missouri | Oakville | | |
| 23 | Ryley Gibbs | (United States) | 6' | 170 | Freshman | O'Fallon, Missouri | Fort Zumwalt South | St. Louis City 2 | |

- (redshirt) = Players "redshirted' for the 2024 season.
- * = Captains

== Schedule and results ==
Source=

=== Exhibitions ===
| August 10, 2024 | SIUE | v | Evansville | Evansville, Indiana |
| 1:00 PM | | [ ] | | Stadium: Arad McCutchan Stadium |

| August 17, 2024 Cougar Kickoff | Marquette | v | SIUE | Edwardsville, Illinois |
| 7:00 PM | | [ ] | | Stadium: Ralph Korte Stadium |

=== Regular season ===
| August 22, 2024 | Michigan State | 1–1 | SIUE | Edwardsville, Illinois |
| 8:00 PM | Kerrigan 38' (pen.) | | Muench 60' (Coleman) | Stadium: Ralph Korte Stadium; Attendance: 100; Referee: Tim Wagner |

| August 29, 2024 Wolstein Classic | SIUE | 0–4 | No.20 Ohio State | Columbus, Ohio |
| 7:00 | | | Vellios 11'; Adedokun 27' (Borkovich); Ajagbe 67' (Vellios); Borkovic 71' (Adedokun) | Stadium: Jesse Owens Memorial Stadium; Attendance: 917; Referee: Eulogio Villalpando |

| September 1, 2024 Wolstein Classic | SIUE | 0–4 | Dayton | Columbus, Ohio |
| 2:00 PM | | | Sigurdsson 44' (Quiah); Quiah 52'; Sigurdsson 64' (Armstrong); Sassine 66' | Stadium: Jesse Owens Memorial Stadium; Attendance: n/a Referee: Saki Atsas |

| September 8, 2024 Bronze Boot Game | No. 19 St. Louis | 0–1 | SIUE | Saint Louis, Missouri |
| 6:30 PM | | | Schaerer 62' (pen.) | Stadium: CityPark; Attendance: 6,128; Referee: n/a |

| September 12, 2024 | SIUE | 1–1 | Memphis | Memphis, Tennessee |
| 6:00 PM | Abeal 13' | | DeFalco 17' (Galizzi) | Stadium: Track and Soccer Complex; Attendance: 135; Referee: Wes Caouette |

| September 18, 2024 | Bradley | 0–2 | SIUE | Edwardsville, Illinois |
| 7:00 PM | | | Schaerer 23' (Dashin); Dashin 30' (Muench) | Stadium: Ralph Korte Stadium; Attendance: 375; Referee: Velimir Milovic |

| September 22, 2024 | Omaha | 1–0 | SIUE | Edwardsville, Illinois |
| 12:00 Noon | Casillas 69' (Adan) | | | Stadium: Ralph Korte Stadium; Attendance: 231; Referee: Matthew Geringer |

| September 28, 2024 | Lindenwood | 0–2 | SIUE | Edwardsville, Illinois |
| 7:00 PM | | | Schaerer 1'; Sanfeliu 54' (Schaerer) | Stadium: Ralph Korte Stadium; Attendance: 335; Referee: Esat Ibarra |

| October 3, 2024 | Eastern Illinois | 0–3 | SIUE | Edwardsville, Illinois |
| 6:00 PM | | | Dashin; Gibson 56' (Schaerer); Abeal 58' (Schaerer) | Stadium: Ralph Korte Stadium; Attendance: 427; Referee: Adam Drees |

| October 5, 2024 Homecoming | Southern Indiana | 0–2 | SIUE | Edwardsville, Illinois |
| 7:00 PM | | | Sanfeliu 7' (]Muench); Abeal 68' (Moreira) | Stadium: Ralph Korte Stadium; Attendance: 2,924; Referee: Matthew Geringer |

| October 10, 2024 | SIUE | 2–0 | Lindenwood | St. Charles, Missouri |
| 7:00 PM | Abeal 81' (pen.); Abeal 89' (Moreira) | | | Stadium: Hunter Stadium; Attendance: 187; Referee: Braeden Frey |

| October 13, 2024 | Liberty | 1–3 | SIUE | Edwardsville, Illinois |
| 12:00 Noon | 63' | | Sanfeliu 22' (Moreira); Bilyeu 78' (Schaerer); Zomeno 87' (Unassisted) | Stadium: Ralph Korte Stadium; Attendance: 96; Referee: Andrew Ellsworth |

| October 17, 2024 | SIUE | 0–0 | Incarnate Word | San Antonio, Texas |
| 7:00 PM | | | | Stadium: Gayle & Tom Benson Stadium |

| October 20, 2024 | SIUE | 0–1 | Houston Christian | Houston, Texas |
| 1:00 PM | | | Okerayi 49' (Wyke) | Stadium: Sorrels Field |

| October 26, 2024 | Western Illinois | 0–3 | SIUE | Edwardsville, Illinois |
| 2:00 PM | | | Muench 9'; Bilyeu 20' (Moreira & Muench); Sanfeliu 22' (Schaerer) | Stadium: Ralph Korte Stadium; Attendance: 212; Referee: Matthew Geringer |

| October 31, 2024 | SIUE | 2–1 | Southern Indiana | Evansville, Indiana |
| 6:00 PM | Karolczak 51' (unassisted); Moreira 78' (unassisted) | | Davila 29' (Frye) | Stadium: Strassweg Field; Attendance: 269; Referee: Aaron Rawlins |

| November 3, 2024 | SIUE | 3–0 | Eastern Illinois | Charleston, Illinois |
| 1:00 PM | Sanfeliu 44' (Bilyeu); K. Gibbs 50' (Dashin); K. Gibbs 67' (Coleman) | | | Stadium: Lakeside Field; Attendance: 50; Referee: Brian Alvarez |

=== Post-season ===
2024 Ohio Valley Conference men's soccer tournament

| November 13, 2024 Semifinal | Incarnate Word | 0–1 | SIUE | Edwardsville, Illinois |
| 6:00 PM | | [ ] | Muench 31' (Schaerer) | Stadium: Ralph Korte Stadium; Attendance: 250; Referee: Art Arustramyan |

| November 16, 2024 Final | Houston Christian | 2–3 ^{(2ot)} | SIUE | Edwardsville, Illinois |
| 6:00 PM | Giwa-McNeil 30' (Okerayi); Butterworth 39' (unassisted) | [ ] | Sanfeliu 22' (Abeal); Dashin 84' (Coleman); Gibson | Stadium: Ralph Korte Stadium; Attendance: 450; Referee: Sorin Stoica |

NCAA Division I men's soccer tournament

| November 21, 2024 1st round | SIUE | 1–5 | #23 Western Michigan | Kalamazoo, MI |
| 12:00 Noon | Dashin 71' (pen.) | [ ] | Smith; Shannon 38' (unassistedf); Mercer; Mercrer; Chapelas | Stadium: WMU Soccer Complex; Attendance: 367; Referee: Nikola Aleksic |

== Scoring ==
Source=

- Through game of November 21.

| Player | Goals | Assists | Points |
|---|---|---|---|
| Schaerer | 3 | 9 | 15 |
| Sanfeliu | 6 | 0 | 12 |
| Dashin | 4 | 4 | 12 |
| Abeal | 5 | 1 | 11 |
| Muench | 3 | 3 | 10 |
| Moreira | 1 | 5 | 7 |
| Bilyeu | 2 | 1 | 5 |
| Gibson | 2 | 0 | 4 |
| K.Gibbs | 2 | 0 | 4 |
| Coleman | 0 | 3 | 3 |
| Zomeno | 1 | 0 | 2 |
| Karolczak | 1 | 0 | 2 |

== Statistics ==
- Through game of November 21.

Field Players
| # | Name | Games | Starts | Minutes | Goals | Assists | Points | Shots | Shot %age | Shots On Goal | OG %age | Yellow/Red cards | Game Winners | Penalty Goals/Kicks |
| 8 | Yasha Schaerer | 20 | 20 | 1508 | 3 | 9 | 15 | 42 | .071 | 19 | .452 | 3–0 | 3 | 1–1 |
| 7 | Jacobo Sanfeliu | 20 | 14 | 1011 | 6 | 0 | 12 | 46 | .130 | 22 | .478 | 0–0 | 2 | 0–0 |
| 10 | Nacho Abeal | 18 | 18 | 1291 | 5 | 1 | 11 | 37 | 0.135 | 16 | 0.432 | 4–0 | 1 | 1–2 |
| 9 | Pavel Dashin | 19 | 12 | 1085 | 4 | 3 | 11 | 26 | .154 | 15 | 0.577 | 2–0 | 1 | 1–1 |
| 19 | Nic Muench | 19 | 18 | 1517 | 3 | 3 | 9 | 26 | .154 | 17 | .607 | 3–0 | 2 | 0/0 |
| 11 | Stephen Moreira | 19 | 18 | 1226 | 1 | 5 | 7 | 23 | 0.043 | 12 | .522 | 2–0 | 1 | 0–0 |
| 17 | Jacob Bilyeu | 20 | 10 | 1084 | 2 | 1 | 5 | 12 | .167 | 7 | .583 | 2–0 | 1 | 0–0 |
| 4 | Wes Gibson | 20 | 20 | 1476 | 2 | 0 | 4 | 5 | 0.400 | 2 | 0.400 | 4–0 | 1 | 0–0 |
| 24 | Karson Gibbs | 16 | 0 | 284 | 2 | 0 | 4 | 4 | .500 | 3 | .750 | 0–0 | 00 | 0–0 |
| 13 | Patrick Coleman | 17 | 6 | 642 | 0 | 3 | 3 | 5 | 0.000 | 2 | .400 | 4–1 | 0 | 0–0 |
| 22 | Jake Karolczak | 20 | 5 | 759 | 1 | 0 | 2 | 12 | .083 | 4 | .333 | 1–0 | 0 | 0–0 |
| 6 | Carles Zomeno | 19 | 19 | 1485 | 1 | 0 | 2 | 13 | .077 | 6 | .462 | 4–0 | 0 | 0–0 |
| 12 | Enrique Ezquerro | 2 | 0 | 14 | 0 | 0 | 0 | 0 | 0.000 | 0 | 0.000 | 0–0 | 0 | 0 |
| 3 | Elliott Forestier | 7 | 1 | 263 | 0 | 0 | 0 | 0 | 0.000 | 0 | 0.000 | 0–0 | 0 | 0–0 |
| 23 | Brian Franco | 11 | 0 | 189 | 0 | 0 | 0 | 0 | 0.000 | 0 | 0.000 | 2–0 | 0 | 0–0 |
| 21 | Ryley Gibbs | 10 | 2 | 228 | 0 | 0 | 0 | 4 | 0.000 | 1 | .250 | 2–0 | 0 | 0–0 |
| 1 | Robert Gjelaj | 19 | 19 | 1696 | 0 | 0 | 0 | 0 | 0.000 | 0 | 0.000 | 0–0 | 0 | 0–0 |
| 27 | Garrison Hill | 4 | 0 | 46 | 0 | 0 | 0 | 0 | 0.000 | 0 | 0.000 | 0–0 | 0 | 0–0 |
| 29 | Ethan Kornas | 3 | 1 | 118 | 0 | 0 | 0 | 0 | 0.000 | 0 | 0.000 | 1–0 | 0 | 0–0 |
| 5 | Archie McDonnell | 19 | 15 | 1387 | 0 | 0 | 0 | 6 | 0.000 | 3 | .500 | 5–0 | 0 | 0–0 |
| 15 | Bobby Pauly | 20 | 19 | 1691 | 0 | 0 | 0 | 2 | 0.000 | 0 | 0.000 | 0–0 | 0 | 0–0 |
| 14 | Zach Renz | 20 | 3 | 669 | 0 | 0 | 0 | 5 | 0.000 | 2 | .400 | 0–0 | 0 | 0–0 |
| | Totals | 20 | – | 19954 | 30 | 25 | 85 | 270 | .111 | 131 | .485 | 40–1 | 12 | 3–4 |
| | Opponents | 20 | – | 19917 | 21 | 20 | 62 | 262 | .080 | 120 | .458 | 35–3 | 5 | 1–4 |

Goalkeepers
| # | Name | Games | Starts | Minutes | Goals allowed | GA Ave. | Saves | Save % | Wins | Loses | Ties | Shutouts | Shots Faced |
| 1 | Rob Gjelaj | 19 | 19 | 1695:02 | 16 | .85 | 83 | .838 | 12 | 4 | 3 | 10 | 241 |
| 29 | Ethan Kornas | 3 | 1 | 118:25 | 5 | 3.80 | 9 | .643 | 0 | 0 | 1 | 0 | 22 |
| | Totals | 20 | – | 1813:27 | 21 | 1.04 | 92 | .814 | 12 | 5 | 3 | 10 | 263 |
| | Opponents | 20 | – | 1813:27 | 30 | 1.49 | 92 | .754 | 5 | 12 | 3 | 5 | 270 |

| Additional stats | Corner kicks | Offsides | Fouls | Goals/game |
|---|---|---|---|---|
| SIUE | 113 | n/a | 200 | 1.5 |
| Opponents | 107 | n/a | 215 | 1.05 |
