= 2024 Ohio Valley Conference men's soccer tournament =

- Classification: Division I
- Teams: 6
- Matches: 5
- Attendance: 1,222
- Site: Korte Stadium; Edwardsville, Illinois
- Champions: SIU Edwardsville (2nd title)
- Winning coach: Cale Wassermann (2nd title)
- MVP: Nic Muench (SIU Edwardsville)
- Broadcast: ESPN+

2024 Ohio Valley Conference men's soccer standings
	Conf.					Overall
Team	W		L		T	W		L		T
SIU Edwardsville ‡	8	–	1	–	1	12	–	5	–	3
Lindenwood ^{#}	6	–	2	–	2	11	–	6	–	3
Houston Christian	5	–	2	–	3	8	–	7	–	5
Liberty	5	–	3	–	2	7	–	7	–	3
Incarnate Word	3	–	2	–	5	6	–	6	–	6
Western Illinois	3	–	7	–	0	8	–	11	–	1
Southern Indiana ^{#}	1	–	7	–	2	2	–	14	–	2
Eastern Illinois	1	–	8	–	1	2	–	12	–	2
‡ – 2024 Ohio Valley tournament champion + – At-large invitation to the 2024 NCAA tournament ^{#} – Ineligible for NCAA tournament (In transition); As of December 17, 2024; Rankings from United Soccer Coaches; Source: OVC

The 2024 Ohio Valley Conference men's soccer tournament was the postseason men's soccer tournament for the Ohio Valley Conference held from November 10 through November 16, 2024. The tournament was hosted by the number one seed and took place at Korte Stadium in Edwardsville, Illinois. The six-team single-elimination tournament consisted of three rounds based on seeding from regular season conference play. The defending champions were the SIU Edwardsville Cougars SIU Edwardsville was the first seed an successfully defended their title, defeating Houston Christian 3–2 in overtime in the final. This was the second conference tournament title for the SIU Edwardsville men's soccer program, both of which have come under head coach Cale Wassermann. As tournament champions, SIU Edwardsville earned the Ohio Valley's automatic berth into the 2024 NCAA Division I men's soccer tournament.

== Seeding ==
Six of the eight Ohio Valley Conference men's soccer programs qualified for the 2024 Tournament. Teams were seeded based on regular season conference record and tiebreakers were used to determine seedings of teams that finished with the same record. No tiebreakers were required as each team finished with a unique regular season conference record.

Seed	School	Conference Record	Points
1	SIUE	8–1–1	25
2	Houston Christian*	5–2–3	18
3	Lindenwood*	6–2–2	20
4	Liberty	5–3–2	17
5	Incarnate Word	3–2–5	14
6	Western Illinois	3–7–0	9

*The top two seeds are given to the teams that win each scheduling pod

== Bracket ==
Quarterfinals; Sunday, Nov. 10
4	Liberty	0
5	Incarnate Word	2
3	Lindenwood	2
6	Western Illinois	1

Semifinals; Wednesday, Nov. 13
1	SIU Edwardsville	1
5	Incarnate Word	0
2	Houston Christian	2
3	Lindenwood	0

Final; Saturday, Nov. 16
1	SIU Edwardsville (a.e.t)	3
2	Houston Christian	2

== Schedule ==
=== Quarterfinals ===
November 10, 2024	#3 Lindenwood	2–1	#6 Western Illinois	Edwardsville, IL
1:00 p.m. CST	Western Illinois Own Goal 11'; Ethan Blake (yellow card) 55'; Quinn Connolly 70'; Josh Francombe (yellow card) 73'; Christos Philippou (yellow card) 84'	Report	(yellow card) 12' Joel McIntyre; (yellow card) 36' Diego Porras; (yellow card) 43' Xavier Gagnon; 57' Liam Gainey	Stadium: Korte Stadium; Attendance: 231; Referee: Esad Omanovic; Assistant referees: Matthew Williams; Kurt Wuebbels; Fourth official: Velimir Milovic

November 10, 2024	#4 Liberty	0–2	#5 Incarnate Word	Edwardsville, IL
4:00 p.m. CST	Spencer Moler (yellow card) 58'	Report	25' Sello Diphoko; 43', (yellow card) 48' Emmanuel Martinez; (yellow card) 62' Tatenda Chigede	Stadium: Korte Stadium; Attendance: 150; Referee: Shane Butler; Assistant referees: Michael Heath; Matthew Stein; Fourth official: Lucas Cross

=== Semifinals ===
November 13, 2024	#2 Houston Christian	2–0	#3 Lindenwood	Edwardsville, IL
3:00 p.m. CST	Sam Zeeman 52', (yellow card) 58'; Thomas Wyke (yellow card) 75'; Ethan Giwa-McNeil 80'	Report	(yellow card) 54' Cameron Caldwell; (yellow card) 81' Noe Bijou; (yellow card) 83' Ethan Blake	Stadium: Korte Stadium; Attendance: 141; Referee: Alex Beehler; Assistant referees: Eulogio Villalpando; Kurt Wuebbles; Fourth official: Jeffrey Patrylo

November 13, 2024	#1 SIU Edwardsville	1–0	#5 Incarnate Word	Edwardsville, IL
6:00 p.m. CST	Nic Muench 31'	Report		Stadium: Korte Stadium; Attendance: 250; Referee: Art Arustramyan; Assistant referees: Besnik Rexhepi; John Kennedy; Fourth official: Braeden Frey

=== Final ===
November 16, 2024	#1 SIU Edwardsville	3–2 (a.e.t.)	#2 Houston Christian	Edwardsville, IL
6:00 p.m. CST	Jacobo Sanfeliu 22'; Archie McDonnell (yellow card) 71'; Pavel Dashin 83'; Wes Gibson 104'	Report	30', (yellow card) 81' Ethan Giwa-McNeil; 39' Theo Butterworth; (yellow card) 84' Ricardo Garcia; (yellow card) 98' Sam Zeeman	Stadium: Korte Stadium; Attendance: 450; Referee: Sorin Stoica; Assistant referees: Cory Formea; Chad Formea; Fourth official: Shane Butler

== Statistics ==
=== Goalscorers ===
There were 13 goals scored in 5 matches, for an average of 2.6 goals per match (as of November 16, 2024).

2 goals

- Ethan Giwa-McNeil – Houston Christian

1 goal

- Theo Butterworth – Houston Christian
- Quinn Connolly – Lindenwood
- Pavel Dashin – SIU Edwardsville
- Sello Diphoko – Incarnate Word
- Liam Gainey – Western Illinois
- Wes Gibson – SIU Edwardsville
- Emmanuel Martinez – Incarnate Word
- Nic Muench – SIU Edwardsville
- Jacobo Sanfeliu – SIU Edwardsville
- Sam Zeeman – Houston Christian

1 own goal

- Western Illinois (vs. Lindenwood)

== All-Tournament team ==
Player	Team
Ethan Giwa-McNeil	Houston Christian
Morgan Worsfold-Gregg	Houston Christian
Sam Zeeman	Houston Christian
Will Ansah	Incarnate Word
Alejandro De La Torre	Incarnate Word
Quinn Connolly	Lindenwood
Josh Francombe	Lindenwood
Pavel Dashin	SIU Edwardsville
Wes Gibson	SIU Edwardsville
**Nic Muench**	SIU Edwardsville
Yasha Schaerer	SIU Edwardsville

MVP in bold
