= 2024 NCAA Division I men's soccer rankings =

- Season: 2024
- NCAA Tournament: 2024
- Preseason No. 1: Clemson
- NCAA Tournament Champions: Vermont
NCAA Division I men's soccer rankings


Two major human polls made up the 2024 NCAA Division I men's soccer rankings: United Soccer Coaches and Top Drawer Soccer.

== Legend ==
	Increase in ranking
	Decrease in ranking
	New to rankings from previous week
Italics	Number of first place votes
(#–#)	Win-loss record
т	Tied with team above or below also with this symbol

== United Soccer Coaches ==
	Preseason Aug 6	Week 1 Aug 27	Week 2 Sep 3	Week 3 Sep 10	Week 4 Sep 17	Week 5 Sept 24	Week 6 Oct 1	Week 7 Oct 8	Week 8 Oct 15	Week 9 Oct 22	Week 10 Oct 29	Week 11 Nov 5	Final Dec 17	
1.	Clemson	Clemson (1–0–0) (7)	West Virginia (3–0–0) (7)	West Virginia (4–0–0) (8)	Stanford (6–1–0) (8)	Pittsburgh (7–1–0) (8)	Pittsburgh (8–1–0) (8)	Pittsburgh (10–1–0) (8)	West Virginia (8–0–3) (8)	Ohio State (10–1–2) (8)	Ohio State (11–1–2) (8)	Ohio State (12–1–3) (8)	Vermont (16–2–6) (4)	1.
2.	Notre Dame	Marshall (1–0–0) (1)	Clemson (1–0–1) (1)	Denver (3–0–3)	Pittsburgh (5–1–0)	Stanford (7–1–1)	Stanford (8–1–1)	Ohio State (9–0–2)	Stanford (8–1–3)	Maryland (8–1–5)	Clemson (10–2–2)	Duke (10–2–4)	Marshall (15–2–7) (3)	2.
3.	West Virginia	Pittsburgh (2–0–0)	Denver (2–0–2)	Stanford (4–1–0)	Denver (4–0–3)	North Carolina (5–0–2)	North Carolina (6–0–3)	Denver (7–1–4)	Marshall (8–1–2)	Clemson (8–2–2)	Pittsburgh (12–3–0)	San Diego (12–1–2)	Ohio State (16–2–4) (1)	3.
4.	Oregon State	West Virginia (2–0–0)	Western Michigan (3–0–1)	Western Michigan (5–0–1)	Clemson (3–1–2)	Ohio State (7–0–1)	Ohio State (7–0–2)	West Virginia (7–0–3)	Pittsburgh (10–3–0)	Marshall (8–1–3)	San Diego (10–1–2)	Denver (11–2–4)	Denver (15–3–5)	4.
5.	Stanford	Western Michigan (2–0–0)	Stanford (3–1–0)	Clemson (1–1–1)	West Virginia (4–0–1)	Denver (5–0–4)	Marshall (7–1–1)	Stanford (8–1–2)	Ohio State (9–1–2)	Pittsburgh (11–3–0)	Duke (8–2–4)	Dayton (11–2–4)	SMU (12–3–6)	5.
6.	North Carolina	Saint Louis (1–0–0)	UCLA (2–0–1)	Marshall (3–1–0)	North Carolina (4–0–2)	West Virginia (5–0–2)	Denver (5–0–4)	Marshall (7–1–2)	Maryland (7–1–4)	West Virginia (9–1–3)	Marshall (9–1–4)	Indiana (10–3–5)	Wake Forest (12–5–7)	6.
7.	Indiana	Syracuse (2–0–0)	Marshall (2–1–0)	Pittsburgh (4–1–0)	Ohio State (5–0–1)	Marshall (5–1–1)	West Virginia (5–0–3)	North Carolina (6–1–3)	North Carolina (7–1–4)	Stanford (8–2–4)	West Virginia (10–1–4)	Clemson (11–2–3)	Pittsburgh (14–6–0)	7.
8.	Marshall	Portland (1–0–0)	Pittsburgh (3–1–0)	Wisconsin (5–0–0)	Seton Hall (6–0–0)	Wisconsin (6–1–0)	Wisconsin (6–1–1)	James Madison (5–0–4)	Clemson (7–2–2)	San Diego (9–1–2)	North Carolina (9–2–4)	Marshall (9–1–5)	UMass (13–4–5)	8.
9.	New Hampshire	Denver (2–0–0)	Northwestern (4–0–0)	Seattle (2–1–1)	Western Michigan (5–0–2)	Charlotte (5–0–2)	Charlotte (6–0–2)	Maryland (6–1–4)	San Diego (8–1–2)	Western Michigan (9–0–5)	Denver (9–2–4)	Pittsburgh (12–4–0)	Clemson (15–3–4)	9.
10.	SMU	UCLA (1–0–1)	Wisconsin (4–0–0)	UCF (2–0–2)	Marshall (4–1–1)	James Madison (4–0–3)	James Madison (5–0–3)	San Diego (8–1–2)	SMU (6–1–5)	Duke (6–2–4)	Maryland (8–2–5)	West Virginia (10–1–5)	San Diego (15–3–2)	10.
11.	Loyola Marymount	Seattle (1–0–1)	Seattle (1–0–1)	North Carolina (3–0–2)	Penn (4–1–0)	Western Michigan (6–0–3)	Western Michigan (6–0–4)	Seton Hall (8–1–1)	Duke (5–2–4)	North Carolina (8–2–4)	High Point (10–2–2)	Missouri State (11–2–2)	Indiana (11–5–5)	11.
12.	Western Michigan	Northwestern (2–0–0)	North Carolina (3–0–1)	Ohio State (4–0–1)	Hofstra (5–0–1)	Clemson (4–1–2)	Maryland (5–1–3)	Clemson (6–2–2)	Penn (9–1–1)	Denver (8–2–4)	NC State (8–2–5)	Penn (12–2–1)	Dayton (14–3–3)	12.
13.	Virginia	Stanford (1–1–0)	VCU (2–0–1)	Seton Hall (5–0–0)	Virginia Tech (5–0–1)	UC Santa Barbara (6–1–1)	San Diego (7–1–2)	George Mason (9–1–0)	Western Michigan (8–0–5)	Missouri State (10–2–1)	Akron (10–3–3)	Akron (10–3–4)	Stanford (9–5–6)	13.
14.	Vermont	VCU (2–0–0)	Georgetown (2–1–1)	Northwestern (5–1–0)	Elon (6–0–0)	Elon (7–0–1)	Hofstra (8–1–1)	Western Michigan (7–0–5)	Denver (7–2–4)	Georgetown (7–3–4)	Western Michigan (10–0–6)	North Carolina (9–3–4)	NC State (10–5–5)	14.
15.	Wake Forest	Louisville (1–0–0)	Louisville (3–0–0)	Penn (3–0–0)	San Diego (5–0–2)	Seton Hall (6–1–0)	Seton Hall (7–1–1)	SMU (6–1–4)	Missouri State (8–2–1)	UCLA (6–3–5)	Dayton (8–2–3)	SMU (9–2–5)	Duke (11–4–4)	15.
16.	Georgetown	Georgetown (1–1–0)	Kentucky (1–0–1)	Hofstra (4–0–1)	Michigan (5–0–2)	SMU (5–1–2)	SMU (6–1–3)	Duke (4–2–3)	Cornell (8–1–2)	Vermont (8–1–4)	Indiana (8–3–5)	Cornell (11–2–2)	West Virginia (13–2–7)	16.
17.	Hofstra	North Carolina (1–0–1)	UCF (1–0–2)	Virginia Tech (4–0–1)	Wisconsin (6–1–0)	Virginia Tech (5–1–1)	Elon (7–1–1)	Missouri State (7–2–1)	Georgetown (6–3–4)	High Point (9–2–2)	Missouri State (10–2–2)	Vermont (9–2–4)	Virginia (11–7–3)	17.
18.	James Madison	UNC Greensboro (2–0–0)	Portland (2–1–0)	Fordham (3–1–1)	NC State (4–0–2)	Providence (5–2–1)	Duke (4–2–2)	Penn (7–1–1)	Michigan (6–1–4)	Hofstra (9–3–2)	Georgetown (8–3–5)	Hofstra (11–4–2)	Kansas City (14–5–3)	18.
19.	UCF	Oregon State (1–1–0)	Saint Louis (1–1–1)	Charlotte (3–0–1)	Charlotte (3–0–2)	Maryland (4–1–3)	Virginia Tech (5–2–1)	Georgetown (5–3–3)	UCLA (5–3–4)	NC State (6–2–5)	Penn (11–2–1)	Washington (8–4–5)	Penn (14–4–1)	19.
20.	Duke	Ohio State (1–0–1)	Syracuse (2–1–1)	Elon (5–0–0)	Northwestern (5–2–0)	Penn (5–1–0)	George Mason (8–1–0)	Cornell (7–1–2)	Vermont (7–1–4)	Penn (10–2–1)	SMU (8–2–5)	UMass (10–3–4)	Western Michigan (12–3–6)	20.
21.	UCLA	UCF (1–0–1)	Ohio State (3–0–1)	San Diego (3–0–2)	James Madison (2–0–3)	San Diego (6–1–2)	Providence (6–2–2)	Hofstra (8–2–1)	Hofstra (9–3–1)	SMU (7–2–5)	Cornell (10–2–2)	NC State (8–3–5)	Akron (12–5–4)	21.
22.	Portland	Wisconsin (2–0–0)	Seton Hall (3–0–0)	Michigan (4–0–1)	UC Santa Barbara (4–1–2)	Hofstra (6–1–1)т	UC Santa Barbara (6–2–1)	Charlotte (6–1–3)	High Point (8–2–2)	Cornell (9–2–2)	Stanford (8–3–4)	High Point (10–3–2)	Cornell (13–4–2)	22.
23.	Seattle	Kentucky (1–0–0)	SMU (2–0–2)	Notre Dame (1–0–2)	College of Charleston (6–0–0)	VCU (4–1–2)т	VCU (4–2–2)	UC Santa Barbara (7–2–2)	NC State (5–2–4)	Duquesne (10–2–1)	Vermont (8–2–4)	Western Michigan (10–1–6)	Hofstra (14–5–2)	23.
24.	Louisville	UC Santa Barbara (1–0–0)	Hofstra (3–0–1)т	NC State (3–0–1)	Bowling Green (5–1–0)	Connecticut (6–0–1)	Clemson (5–2–2)	Virginia Tech (6–3–1)	Duquesne (9–2–1)	Akron (8–3–3)	Hofstra (10–4–2)	Georgetown (8–4–5)	Missouri State (12–4–2)	24.
25.	Syracuse	Seton Hall (1–0–0)	Penn (1–0–0)т	Georgetown (2–2–2)	Connecticut (5–0–1)	Michigan (5–0–3)	Penn (6–1–1)	Wisconsin (6–3–1)	Akron (7–3–3)	Indiana (7–3–5)т Dayton (7–2–3)т	UCLA (6–4–5)	Providence (10–4–3)	Georgetown (11–5–5)	25.
	Preseason Aug 6	Week 1 Aug 27	Week 2 Sep 3	Week 3 Sep 10	Week 4 Sep 17	Week 5 Sept 24	Week 6 Oct 1	Week 7 Oct 8	Week 8 Oct 15	Week 9 Oct 22	Week 10 Oct 29	Week 11 Nov 5	Final Dec 17	
		Dropped: No. 2 Notre Dame; No. 7 Indiana; No. 9 New Hampshire; No. 10 SMU; No. 11 Loyola Marymount; No. 13 Virginia; No. 14 Vermont; No. 15 Wake Forest; No. 17 Hofstra; No. 18 James Madison; No. 20 Duke	Dropped: No. 18 UNC Greensboro; No. 19 Oregon State; No. 24 UC Santa Barbara	Dropped: No. 6 UCLA; No. 13 VCU; No. 15 Louisville; No. 16 Kentucky; No. 18 Portland; No. 19 Saint Louis; No. 20 Syracuse; No. 23 SMU	Dropped: No. 9 Seattle; No. 10 UCF; No. 18 Fordham; No. 23 Notre Dame; No. 25 Georgetown	Dropped: No. 18 NC State; No. 20 Northwestern; No. 23 College of Charleston; No. 24 Bowling Green	Dropped: No. 24 Connecticut; No. 25 Michigan	Dropped: No. 17 Elon; No. 21 Providence; No. 23 VCU	Dropped: No. 8 James Madison; No. 11 Seton Hall; No. 13 George Mason; No. 22 Charlotte; No. 23 UC Santa Barbara; No. 24 Virginia Tech; No. 25 Wisconsin	Dropped: No 18 Michigan	Dropped: No. 23 Duquesne	Dropped: No. 10 Maryland; No. 22 Stanford; No. 25 UCLA	Dropped: No. 14 North Carolina; No. 19 Washington; No. 22 High Point; No. 25 Providence	

== Top Drawer Soccer ==
	Week 1 Aug 19	Week 2 Aug 26	Week 3 Sep 2	Week 4 Sep 9	Week 5 Sep 16	Week 6 Sep 23	Week 7 Sep 30	Week 8 Oct 7	Week 9 Oct 14	Week 10 Oct 21	Week 11 Oct 28	Week 12 Nov 4	Week 13 Nov 11	Week 14 Nov 18	Week 15 Nov 25	Week 16 Dec 2	Final Dec 23	
1.	Clemson	Clemson (1–0–0)	West Virginia (3–0–0)	West Virginia (4–0–1)	Denver (4–0–3)	Denver (5–0–4)	Denver (6–0–4)	Denver (7–0–4)	West Virginia (8–0–3)	Maryland (8–1–4)	Ohio State (11–1–2)	Ohio State (12–1–3)	Ohio State (13–1–3)	Ohio State (14–1–3)	Ohio State (15–1–3)	Ohio State (15–1–4)	Vermont (15–2–7)	1.
2.	Notre Dame	West Virginia (1–0–0)	Denver (2–0–2)	Denver (3–0–3)	Stanford (6–1–0)	Stanford (7–1–1)	Stanford (8–1–1)	Pittsburgh (9–1–0)	Marshall (8–1–2)	Ohio State (10–1–2)	High Point (10–2–2)	Denver (11–2–4)	Denver (12–2–4)	Dayton (13–2–3)	Dayton (14–2–3)	Wake Forest (12–4–7)	Marshall (15–2–7)	2.
3.	West Virginia	Marshall (1–0–0)	Stanford (3–1–0)	Stanford (5–1–0)	Penn (4–0–0)	Pittsburgh (7–1–0)	Pittsburgh (9–1–0)	Ohio State (8–0–2)	Stanford (8–1–3)	Marshall (8–1–3)	Pittsburgh (12–3–0)	Duke (10–2–4)	Clemson (13–2–3)	West Virginia (12–1–7)	San Diego (15–2–2)	Marshall (13–1–7)	Ohio State (16–2–4)	3.
4.	Stanford	Denver (2–0–0)	UCLA (2–0–1)	Western Michigan (5–0–1)	West Virginia (4–0–1)	SMU (5–1–2)	Marshall (7–1–1)	Stanford (8–1–2)	SMU (6–1–5)	Stanford (8–2–3)	Denver (9–2–4)	San Diego (12–1–2)	Penn (13–2–1)	San Diego (13–2–2)	Wake Forest (11–4–7)	Denver (14–3–4)	Denver (15–3–5)	4.
5.	Indiana	Oregon State (1–0–0)	SMU (2–0–2)	Penn (3–0–0)	Pittsburgh (5–1–0)	North Carolina (5–0–2)	Notre Dame (5–1–3)	West Virginia (7–0–3)	Pittsburgh (10–2–0)	High Point (9–2–2)	Maryland (8–2–5)	High Point (10–3–2)	High Point (11–3–2)	Wake Forest (10–4–7)	Clemson (15–2–4)	Pittsburgh (14–5–0)	Wake Forest (12–5–7)	5.
6.	Marshall	Stanford (1–1–0)	Clemson (1–0–1)	Pittsburgh (4–1–0)	SMU (3–1–2)	Marshall (5–1–1)	SMU (6–1–3)	Marshall (7–1–2)	Ohio State (9–1–2)	Pittsburgh (11–3–0)	Clemson (10–2–2)	Pittsburgh (12–4–0)	Cornell (12–2–2)	Clemson (14–2–4)	Marshall (12–1–7)	SMU (12–2–6)	Pittsburgh (14–6–0)	6.
7.	North Carolina	Western Michigan (2–0–0)	Notre Dame (0–0–2)	Wisconsin (5–0–0)	Clemson (3–1–1)	Penn (5–1–0)	Maryland (5–1–4)	James Madison (5–0–4)	Maryland (7–1–4)	Denver (8–2–4)	Marshall (9–1–4)	Clemson (11–2–3)	Dayton (11–2–3)	Marshall (11–1–7)	Denver (13–3–4)	UMass (13–3–5)	SMU (12–3–6)	7.
8.	Virginia	Notre Dame (0–0–1)	Saint Louis (1–1–0)	Notre Dame (1–0–3)	Western Michigan (5–0–2)	Wisconsin (6–1–0)	Hofstra (8–1–1)	SMU (6–1–4)	Denver (7–2–4)	West Virginia (9–1–3)	Duke (8–2–4)	Marshall (9–1–5)	Marshall (10–1–6)	Princeton (12–6–0)	Pittsburgh (13–5–0)	Vermont (13–2–6)	UMass (13–4–5)	8.
9.	Oregon State	Saint Louis (1–0–0)	Indiana (1–1–1)	SMU (2–1–2)	UCLA (3–1–2)	West Virginia (5–0–2)	North Carolina (6–0–3)	Duke (4–2–3)	Clemson (7–2–2)	Clemson (8–2–2)	North Carolina (9–2–4)	SMU (9–2–5)	West Virginia (11–1–6)	Gardner-Webb (12–3–3)	SMU (11–2–6)	Dayton (14–3–3)	Dayton (14–3–3)	9.
10.	SMU	Pittsburgh (2–0–0)	Western Michigan (2–0–1)	Clemson (2–1–1)	Elon (6–0–0)	Ohio State (7–0–1)	Duke (4–2–2)	Maryland (6–1–4)	Penn (9–1–1)	Duke (6–2–4)	West Virginia (10–1–4)	Penn (12–2–1)	Duke (11–3–4)	Penn (14–3–1)	Indiana (11–4–5)	San Diego (15–3–2)	San Diego (15–3–2)	10.
11.	Georgetown	UCLA (1–0–1)	Penn (1–0–0)	Marshall (4–1–0)	Wisconsin (5–1–0)	Western Michigan (6–0–3)	Charlotte (6–0–3)	Clemson (6–2–2)	Duke (5–2–4)	SMU (7–2–5)	SMU (8–2–5)	Cornell (11–2–2)	San Diego (12–2–2)	High Point (11–4–2)	Kansas City (14–4–3)	Clemson (15–3–4)	Clemson (15–3–4)	11.
12.	James Madison	Indiana (0–1–0)	Pittsburgh (3–1–0)	UCLA (2–1–2)	Hofstra (5–0–1)	Clemson (4–1–2)	James Madison (5–0–3)	North Carolina (6–1–3)	North Carolina (7–1–4)	Western Michigan (9–0–5)	San Diego (10–1–2)	Dayton (10–2–3)	Missouri State (12–2–2)	Denver (12–3–4)	Virginia (11–6–3)	Indiana (11–5–5)	Indiana (11–5–5)	12.
13.	Loyola Marymount	James Madison (0–0–2)	North Carolina (2–0–1)	Elon (5–0–0)	North Carolina (4–0–2)	Duke (3–2–2)	Wisconsin (6–2–1)	Notre Dame (5–2–3)	Western Michigan (8–0–5)	James Madison (7–1–5)	Stanford (8–3–4)	Indiana (10–3–5)	Akron (11–3–4)	Cornell (12–3–2)	UMass (12–3–5)	Kansas City (14–5–3)	Kansas City (14–5–3)	13.
14.	Vermont	North Carolina (1–0–1)	Georgetown (2–1–0)	Hofstra (4–0–1)	Marshall (4–1–1)	Elon (7–0–1)	West Virginia (6–0–3)	Western Michigan (7–0–5)	High Point (7–2–2)	North Carolina (8–2–4)	Penn (11–2–1)	North Carolina (9–3–4)	Pittsburgh (12–5–0)	Georgetown (11–4–5)	NC State (10–4–5)	Virginia (11–7–3)	Virginia (11–7–3)	14.
15.	Denver	Syracuse (2–0–0)	Marshall (1–1–0)	Seattle (2–1–1)	Virginia Tech (5–0–1)	UCLA (3–2–3)	Ohio State (7–0–2)	Penn (7–1–1)	Cornell (8–1–2)	Oregon State (8–2–2)	Akron (10–3–3)	Maryland (8–4–5)	Gardner-Webb (11–3–3)	Duke (11–3–4)	Vermont (12–2–6)	NC State (10–5–5)	NC State (10–5–5)	15.
16.	Hofstra	SMU (1–0–1)	Kentucky (1–0–0)	Grand Canyon (3–2–0)	Ohio State (5–0–1)	Virginia Tech (5–1–1)	Western Michigan (7–0–4)	Seton Hall (8–1–1)	James Madison (5–1–5)	Monmouth (8–1–5)	Cornell (10–2–2)	West Virginia (10–1–5)	Wake Forest (9–4–6)	Missouri State (12–3–2)	Stanford (9–5–5)	Stanford (9–5–6)	Stanford (9–5–6)	16.
17.	New Hampshire	Vermont (0–1–0)	Virginia (2–1–0)	Duke (3–1–1)	Notre Dame (1–1–3)	Notre Dame (2–1–3)	Clemson (5–2–2)	Hofstra (8–2–1)	Notre Dame (5–3–4)	Penn (10–2–1)	Western Michigan (10–0–6)	Missouri State (11–2–2)	SMU (10–2–6)	Pittsburgh (12–5–0)	Penn (14–4–1)	Penn (14–4–1)	Penn (14–4–1)	17.
18.	UCF	Georgetown (1–1–0)	Oral Roberts (2–1–1)	North Carolina (3–0–2)	Duquesne (4–0–1)	Maryland (4–1–3)	Elon (7–2–1)	Dayton (5–1–2)	Hofstra (9–3–1)	Akron (8–3–3)	Dayton (8–2–3)	Akron (10–3–4)	Indiana (10–4–5)	SMU (10–2–6)	Cornell (13–4–2)	Cornell (13–4–2)	Cornell (13–4–2)	18.
19.	Wake Forest	Kentucky (1–0–0)	Portland (1–1–0)	Kentucky (1–2–1)	Seton Hall (6–0–0)	Hofstra (6–1–1)	Penn (6–1–1)	Connecticut (7–0–3)	UNC Greensboro (6–1–4)	Georgetown (7–3–4)	Indiana (8–3–5)	Gardner-Webb (10–3–3)	North Carolina (9–4–4)	Indiana (10–4–5)	Georgetown (11–5–5)	Georgetown (11–5–5)	Georgetown (11–5–5)	19.
20.	Duke	Virginia (1–1–0)	Hofstra (2–0–1)	Indiana (1–2–2)	Duke (3–2–1)	Charlotte (5–0–2)	Virginia Tech (6–2–1)	High Point (6–2–2)	Oregon State (7–2–2)	Cornell (9–2–2)	James Madison (7–2–6)	UNC Greensboro (10–2–4)	Virginia (10–5–3)	Akron (11–4–4)	Duke (11–4–4)	Duke (11–4–4)	Duke (11–4–4)	20.
21.	UCLA	Portland (1–0–0)	Syracuse (2–0–1)	Virginia Tech (4–0–1)	Maryland (3–1–3)	Michigan (5–0–3)	UNC Greensboro (4–1–3)	George Mason (9–1–0)	Seton Hall (9–2–1)	Dayton (7–2–3)	Oregon State (8–3–2)	Wake Forest (8–4–5)	Oregon State (10–3–3)	North Carolina (9–4–4)	Missouri State (12–4–2)	Missouri State (12–4–2)	Missouri State (12–4–2)	21.
22.	Kentucky	Hofstra (1–0–1)	Seattle (1–0–1)	Duquesne (4–0–1)	Creighton (4–1–2)	UNC Greensboro (3–1–3)	Michigan (5–0–4)	Cornell (7–1–2)	Kansas City (7–2–3)	Indiana (7–3–5)	NC State (8–2–5)	Western Michigan (10–1–6)	San Diego State (10–4–3)	Hofstra (14–4–2)	West Virginia (13–2–7)	West Virginia (13–2–7)	West Virginia (13–2–7)	22.
23.	Portland	Duke (1–0–1)	Oregon State (1–1–1)	UCF (2–1–2)	College of Charleston (6–0–0)	Seton Hall (6–1–0)	Seton Hall (7–1–1)	UNC Greensboro (4–1–4)	Akron (7–3–3)	Missouri State (10–2–1)	Missouri State (10–2–2)	Oregon State (9–3–3)	UNC Greensboro (10–2–5)	Evansville (11–6–3)	Gardner-Webb (13–4–3)	Garnder-Webb (13–4–3)	Garnder-Webb (13–4–3)	23.
24.	Syracuse	Seattle (1–0–1)	Washington (2–1–1)	Oral Roberts (2–2–2)	Michigan (5–0–1)	Dayton (4–1–2)	Dayton (4–1–2)	Charlotte (6–1–3)	Michigan (6–1–4)	Hofstra (9–3–2)	Georgetown (8–3–5)	NC State (8–3–5)	Providence (10–4–3)	UNC Greensboro (10–2–5)	Akron (12–5–4)	Akron (12–5–4)	Akron (12–5–4)	24.
25.	SUIE	UCF (1–0–1)	Wisconsin (3–0–0)	Ohio State (4–0–1)	Dayton (4–1–0)	VCU (4–1–2)	VCU (4–2–3)	Oregon State (6–2–2)	George Mason (10–2–0)	NC State (6–2–5)	South Carolina (9–3–2)	San Diego State (10–4–3)	Hofstra (13–4–2)	Kansas City (12–4–3)	Hofstra (14–5–2)	Hofstra (14–5–2)	Hofstra (14–5–2)	25.
	Week 1 Aug 19	Week 2 Aug 26	Week 3 Sep 2	Week 4 Sep 9	Week 5 Sep 16	Week 6 Sep 23	Week 7 Sep 30	Week 8 Oct 7	Week 9 Oct 14	Week 10 Oct 21	Week 11 Oct 28	Week 12 Nov 4	Week 13 Nov 11	Week 14 Nov 18	Week 15 Nov 25	Week 16 Dec 2	Final Dec 23	
		Dropped: No. 13 Loyola Marymount; No. 17 New Hampshire; No. 19 Wake Forest; No. 25 SIUE	Dropped: No. 13 James Madison; No. 17 Vermont; No. 23 Duke; No. 25 UCF	Dropped: No. 8 Saint Louis; No. 14 Georgetown; No. 17 Virginia; No. 19 Portland; No. 21 Syracuse; No. 23 Oregon State; No. 24 Washington	Dropped: No. 15 Seattle; No. 16 Grand Canyon; No. 19 Kentucky; No. 20 Indiana; No. 23 UCF; No. 24 Oral Roberts	Dropped: No. 18 Duquesne; No. 22 Creighton; No. 23 College of Charleston	Dropped: No. 15 UCLA	Dropped: No. 13 Wisconsin; No. 18 Elon; No. 20 Virginia Tech; No. 22 Michigan; No. 25 VCU	Dropped: No. 18 Dayton; No. 19 Connecticut; No. 24 Charlotte	Dropped: No. 17 Notre Dame; No. 19 UNC Greensboro; No. 21 Seton Hall; No. 22 Kansas City; No. 24 Michigan; No. 25 George Mason	Dropped: No. 16 Monmouth; No. 24 Hofstra	Dropped: No. 13 Stanford; No. 20 James Madison; No. 24 Georgetown; No. 25 South Carolina	Dropped: No. 15 Maryland; No. 22 Western Michigan; No. 24 NC State	Dropped: No. 20 Virginia; No. 21 Oregon State; No. 22 San Diego State; No. 24 Providence	Dropped: No. 21 North Carolina; No. 23 Evansville; No. 24 UNC Greensboro; No. 25 Kansas City	Dropped: None	Dropped: None	
