= 2024 NCAA Men's Soccer All-Americans =

- Awarded for: 2024 NCAA Division I men's soccer season

An All-American team is an honorary sports team composed of the best amateur players of a specific season for each team position—who in turn are given the honorific "All-America" and typically referred to as "All-American athletes", or simply "All-Americans". Although the honorees generally do not compete together as a unit, the term is used in U.S. team sports to refer to players who are selected by members of the national media. Walter Camp selected the first All-America team in the early days of American football in 1889. The 2024 NCAA Men's Soccer All-Americans are honorary lists that include All-American selections from the United Soccer Coaches (USC) and Top Drawer Soccer (TDS) for the 2024 NCAA Division I men's soccer season. All selectors choose a first, second, and third 11-man team.

Although the aforementioned lists are used to determine consensus honors, there are numerous other All-American lists. The three finalists for the Hermann Trophy are described as Hermann All-Americans. Other All-American lists include those determined by Hero Sports and many others. The scholar-athletes selected by College Sports Information Directors of America (CoSIDA) are termed Academic All-Americans.

== Individual All-America teams ==
=== By player ===
This list is of players who were named first-team All-Americans by each respective publication.

Key

TDS	Top Drawer Soccer
USC	United Soccer Coaches
†	Awarded the Hermann Trophy as national Player of the Year

List

Position	Name	School	TDS	USC	Notes
Goalkeeper	Wessel Speel	Duke	✓	✓	ACC Goalkeeper of the Year
Defender	Casper Svendby	Pittsburgh	✓	✓	ACC Defensive Player of the Year
Midfielder	Sam Bassett	Denver	✓	✓	Summit League Midfielder of the Year
Midfielder	Michael Adedokun^{†}*	Ohio State	✓	✓	Hermann Trophy winner
Forward	Emil Jaaskelainen	Akron	✓	✓	Big East Offensive Player of the Year

=== By team ===
All-America Team	First team		Second team		Third team	
All-America Team	Player	School	Player	School	Player	School
Top Drawer Soccer	Wessel Speel	Duke	Colin Welsh	Western Michigan	Robert Alphin	Wake Forest
Top Drawer Soccer	Casper Svendby	Pittsburgh	Hjalti Sigurdsson	Datyon	Max Murray	Vermont
Top Drawer Soccer	Leo Burney	Penn	Siggi Magnusson	Ohio State	Quinton Elliot	Indiana
Top Drawer Soccer	Zach Barrett	Vermont	Ronan Wynne	Denver	Riley Thomas	North Carolina
Top Drawer Soccer	Sam Bassett	Denver	Joseph Melto Quiah	Datyon	Arnau Farnos	Oregon State
Top Drawer Soccer	Michael Adedokun	Ohio State	Bailey Sparks	SMU	Carson Hodgson	Western Michigan
Top Drawer Soccer	Daniel D'Ippolito	Fordham	Sydney Wathuta	Vermont	Julien Le Bourdoulous	Kansas City
Top Drawer Soccer	Taimu Okiyoshi	Marshall	Joran Gerbet	Clemson	Guilherme Feitosa	Pittsburgh
Top Drawer Soccer	Emil Jaaskelainen	Akron	Lineker Rodrigues dos Santos	Marshall	Sergio Ors Navarro	West Virginia
Top Drawer Soccer	Alex Harris	Cornell	Yaniv Bazini	Vermont	Elie Kisoka	Kansas City
Top Drawer Soccer	Alec Hughes	Massachusetts	Jesus Barea	Missouri State	Trace Terry	Bowling Green
United Soccer Coaches	Wessel Speel	Duke	Colin Welsh	Western Michigan	Mitch Budler	Akron
United Soccer Coaches	Kyle Cusimano	Bowling Green	Max Broughton	West Virginia	Alex Matthews	Missouri State
United Soccer Coaches	Siggi Magnusson	Ohio State	Leo Burney	Penn	Hjalti Sigurdsson	Datyon
United Soccer Coaches	Casper Svendby	Pittsburgh	Quinton Elliot	Indiana	Riley Thomas	North Carolina
United Soccer Coaches	Michael Adedokun	Ohio State	Taimu Okiyoshi	Marshall	Arnau Farnos	Oregon State
United Soccer Coaches	Sam Bassett	Denver	Joseph Melto Quiah	Datyon	Cooper Flax	Wake Forest
United Soccer Coaches	Joran Gerbet	Clemson	Bailey Sparks	SMU	Carson Hodgson	Western Michigan
United Soccer Coaches	Jesus Barea	Missouri State	Ulfur Bjornsson	Duke	Connor Miller	Cornell
United Soccer Coaches	Emil Jaaskelainen	Akron	Alex Harris	Cornell	Samy Kanaan	San Diego
United Soccer Coaches	Sergio Ors Navarro	West Virginia	Alec Hughes	Massachusetts	Sammy Sarver	Indiana
United Soccer Coaches	Lineker Rodrigues dos Santos	Marshall	Trace Terry	Bowling Green	Sergi Solans	Oregon State

== Academic All-Americans ==
CoSIDA names three Academic All-American teams for the 2024 season.

First team		Second team		Third team	
Player	School	Player	School	Player	School
JT Harms	Indiana	Marco Brougher	California	Erik Lauta	New Hampshire
Max Broughton	West Virginia	Andre Cutler-DeJesus	Syracuse	Ruben Mesalles	Duke
Pierce Infuso	Hofstra	Matthew Helfrich	Georgetown	Enzo Newman	Oregon State
Hjalti Sigurdsson	Datyon	Brock Pickett	Wright State	Ian Pilcher	Charlotte
Henrik Winkelmann	Siena	Christian Shannon	Western Michigan	Sam Bassett	Denver
Ryan Baer	West Virginia	Ronan Wynne	Denver	Daniel D'Ippolito	Fordham
Brendan Herb	UNC Asheville	Guilherme Feitosa	Pittsburgh	Charlie Kriel	Navy
Patrick Short	Drexel	Drew Kerr	Duke	Logan Dorsey	Kentucky
Marcus Caldeira	West Virginia	Sam Williams	North Carolina	Cole Werthmuller	Wright State
Matthew Roou	Notre Dame	Ethan Ballek	South Carolina	Cole Werthmuller	Wright State
Omar Yehya	Utah Valley	Jesus Barea	Missouri State	Cole Werthmuller	Wright State
Omar Yehya	Utah Valley	Ulfur Bjornsson	Duke	Cole Werthmuller	Wright State
Omar Yehya	Utah Valley	Noah Kvifte	Florida Atlantic	Cole Werthmuller	Wright State

== Freshman All-Americans ==
All-America Team	First team		Second team	
All-America Team	Player	School	Player	School
Top Drawer Soccer
Top Drawer Soccer	Niklas Herceg	Vermont	Max Kerkvliet	Connecticut
Top Drawer Soccer	Tate Johnson	North Carolina	Aidan Martin	Cornell
Top Drawer Soccer	Niklas Soerensen	Pittsburgh	Christian Shannon	Western Michigan
Top Drawer Soccer	Tate Lampman	Georgetown	Josh Maher	Indiana
Top Drawer Soccer	Ransford Gyan	Clemson	Edgar Leon	Seattle
Top Drawer Soccer	Dylan Borso	Wake Forest	Sabri Hanni	Connecticut
Top Drawer Soccer	Issah Haruna	UNC Greensboro	Harvey Sarajian	Georgia Southern
Top Drawer Soccer	Alejandro Velazquez-Lopez	South Carolina	Matthew Zachemski	Wisconsin
Top Drawer Soccer	Sergi Solans	Oregon State	David Ajagbe	Ohio State
Top Drawer Soccer	Dean Boltz	Wisconsin	Wahabu Musah	Clemson
Top Drawer Soccer	Andrew Armstrong	Dayton	Marius Stenner	Delaware
Top Drawer Soccer	Andrew Armstrong	Dayton	David Raphael	San Francisco
