= Bob Thompson (soccer) =

American soccer coach (born 1981)

Personal information
- Full name: Robert Thompson
- Date of birth: May 7, 1981 (age 45)
- Place of birth: Framingham, Massachusetts, United States
- Height: 5 ft 9 in (1.75 m)
- Position: Midfielder

College career
Years	Team	Apps	(Gls)
1999–2002	Boston College	72	(14)

Senior career*
Years	Team	Apps	(Gls)
2004–2005	New England Revolution		

Managerial career
- 2007–2010: Northeastern (Assistant Coach)
- 2010–2012: Tufts (Assistant Coach)
- 2012–2014: Boston College (Assistant Coach)
- 2014–2016: UMass Lowell (Assistant Coach)
- 2017–2018: UMass Lowell (Associate Head Coach)
- 2018–2019: Boston College (Associate Head Coach)
- 2020–present: Boston College
- * Club domestic league appearances and goals

Bob Thompson (born May 7, 1981) is an American soccer coach who is the current head coach of Boston College. He previously played professionally with the New England Revolution before coaching at Northeastern, Tufts, and UMass Lowell as an assistant.

== Playing career ==
Thompson was born in Framingham, Massachusetts. He was a midfielder for the Boston College Eagles from 1999 to 2003. The team had a 46-29-3 record during his four seasons as a player. The team also made 3 NCAA Tournament berths and won two Big East titles during that time. Thompson was named to the All-Big East First Team in 2002 and was Big East Tournament MVP in 2000 and 2002. Thompson scored 14 goals and recorded 20 assists in 72 appearances during his time with the Eagles.

After his college playing career, Thompson spent two seasons with the New England Revolution and one season in Greece before returning to the United States to begin his coaching career.

== Coaching career ==
Thompson began his coaching career at Northeastern as an assistant coach. He held this position from 2007 to 2010. He was hired as the assistant coach at Tufts in 2010. While at Tufts the team improved from a 2–10–2 record to a 9–3–2 record the following year. Thompson played a part in recuriting two of the classes that would go on to win the 2014 DIII National Championship. In 2012, his alma mater, Boston College hired him as assistant coach. He stayed for two years, until 2016 before leaving to become an assistant coach at UMass Lowell. While at UMass Lowell, Thompson was part of the 2015 America East Coaching Staff of the year. He was later promoted to associate head coach in 2017. In 2018, Thompson would return to Boston College as an Associate Head Coach. After a successful interim spell in 2019, he was named the head coach in 2020. Thompson succeeded long time Boston College coach Ed Kelly, who he played under while at Boston College.

== Head coaching record ==
Record table
Season	Team	Overall	Conference	Standing	Postseason
Boston College (Atlantic Coast Conference) (2020–present)
2020	Boston College	1–3–1	1–3–1	5th (Atlantic)	
2021	Boston College	6–7–2	2–4–2	4th (Atlantic)	
2022	Boston College	4–7–5	1–4–3	5th (Atlantic)	
2023	Boston College	3–9–5	0–5–3	6th Atlantic	
2024	Boston College	5–5–6	1–4–3	13th	
Boston College:		19–31–19	5–20–12		
Total:		19–31–19			
National champion Postseason invitational champion Conference regular season champion Conference regular season and conference tournament champion Division regular season champion Division regular season and conference tournament champion Conference tournament champion
