= 2024 Atlantic Coast Conference men's soccer season =

- League: NCAA Division I
- Sport: Soccer
- Duration: August 22, 2024 – November 1, 2024
- Teams: 15

2025 MLS SuperDraft
- Top draft pick: Hakin Karamoko, 10th overall
- Picked by: D.C. United

Regular season
- Season champions: Pittsburgh
- Runners-up: Clemson
- Season MVP: Offensive:Matthew Roou; Midfielder:Joran Gerbet; Defensive:Casper Svendby
- Top scorer: Matthew Roou

ACC tournament
- Champions: Wake Forest
- Runners-up: Clemson
- Finals MVP: (Ghana) Prince Amponsah

ACC men's soccer seasons
- ← 2023 2025 →

2024 ACC men's soccer standings
	Conf.					Overall
Team	W		L		T	W		L		T
No. 7 Pittsburgh +	6	–	2	–	0	14	–	6	–	0
No. 9 Clemson +	5	–	2	–	1	15	–	3	–	4
No. 15 Duke +	4	–	1	–	3	11	–	4	–	4
No. 6 Wake Forest ‡	4	–	2	–	2	12	–	5	–	7
No. 5 SMU +	4	–	2	–	2	12	–	3	–	6
North Carolina +	4	–	3	–	1	9	–	4	–	5
No. 13 Stanford +	3	–	2	–	3	9	–	5	–	6
No. 17 Virginia +	3	–	3	–	2	11	–	7	–	3
No. 14 NC State +	3	–	3	–	2	10	–	5	–	5
Notre Dame	3	–	3	–	2	7	–	5	–	5
Syracuse	2	–	4	–	2	7	–	7	–	3
California	2	–	4	–	2	8	–	8	–	2
Boston College	1	–	4	–	3	5	–	5	–	6
Virginia Tech	1	–	5	–	2	7	–	6	–	4
Louisville	0	–	5	–	3	6	–	7	–	4
‡ – ACC tournament champion + – At-large invitation to the 2024 NCAA tournament; As of December 17, 2024; Rankings from United Soccer Coaches; Source: The ACC

The 2024 Atlantic Coast Conference men's soccer season was the 71st season of men's varsity soccer in the conference. This was the first season with fifteen teams competing in the conference, after the additions of California, SMU, and Stanford on July 1, 2024.

Wake Forest were the defending regular season champions of the Atlantic Division and Notre Dame were the defending regular season champions of the Coastal Division. Neither of those two teams could use their regular season championships to win the ACC tournament title, as Clemson won as the fourth seed. Clemson and Notre Dame faced-off in the NCAA tournament final. Clemson would go on to win the game 2–1. It marked the third straight year that an ACC team won the college soccer championship.

== Teams ==
=== Stadiums and locations ===
Team	Stadium	Capacity
Boston College	Newton Campus Soccer Field	1,800
California	Edwards Stadium	22,000
Clemson	Riggs Field	6,500
Duke	Koskinen Stadium	7,000
Louisville	Lynn Stadium	5,300
NC State	Dail Soccer Field	3,000
Notre Dame	Alumni Stadium	2,500

Team	Stadium	Capacity
North Carolina	Dorrance Field	4,200
Pittsburgh	Ambrose Urbanic Field	735
SMU	Washburne Stadium	2,577
Stanford	Laird Q. Cagan Stadium	2,952
Syracuse	SU Soccer Stadium	1,500
Virginia	Klöckner Stadium	7,100
Virginia Tech	Thompson Field	2,500
Wake Forest	Spry Stadium	3,000

Note: Florida State, Georgia Tech and Miami (FL) are members of the Atlantic Coast Conference but do not sponsor men's soccer.

== Coaches ==
=== Head coaching changes ===
One ACC team will start the season with a new head coach as George Kiefer mutually agreed to part ways with NC State on November 3, 2023. Marc Hubbard was hired as his replacement on December 9, 2023.

=== Head coaching records ===
Team	Head coach	Years at school	Overall record	Record at school	ACC record
Boston College	Bob Thompson	5	14–26–13	14–26–13	4–16–9
California	Leonard Griffin	3	31–35–15	11–14–11	0–0–0
Clemson	Mike Noonan	15	381–194–77	168–81–41	60–41–18
Duke	John Kerr Jr.	17	230–159–51	150–100–38	58–56–21
Louisville	John Michael Hayden	6	46–35–10	46–35–10	19–20–5
North Carolina	Carlos Somoano	14	167–58–43	156–58–43	61–26–23
NC State	Marc Hubbard	1	232–52–37	0–0–0	0–0–0
Notre Dame	Chad Riley	7	64–39–17	64–39–17	23–21–6
Pittsburgh	Jay Vidovich	9	282–116–44	75–62–13	26–30–10
SMU	Kevin Hudson	9	89–38–15	89–38–15	0–0–0
Stanford	Jeremy Gunn	13	336–108–77	149–47–46	0–0–0
Syracuse	Ian McIntyre	15	239–156–79	132–92–47	22–41–22
Virginia	George Gelnovatch	29	366–147–68	366–147–68	105–74–36
Virginia Tech	Mike Brizendine	16	106–131–39	106–131–39	28–77–21
Wake Forest	Bobby Muuss	10	215–90–42	140–34–18	52–12–11

Notes

- Records shown are prior to the 2024 season
- Years at school includes the 2024 season
- ACC records include only years with current school.

== Preseason ==
=== Hermann Trophy ===
The Hermann Trophy preseason watchlist was released on August 22, 2024.

Player	Class	Position	School
Nick Dang	Senior	DF	Virginia

=== Preseason Poll ===
The 2024 ACC Preseason Poll was released on August 14, 2024 before the season began. The full results of the poll are shown below:

Predicted finish	Team	Points (1st place)
1	Clemson	193 (12)
2	Notre Dame	167
3	North Carolina	156 (2)
4	Wake Forest	149 (1)
5	Stanford	147
6	Virginia	124
7	Duke	122
8	SMU	99
9	Pittsburgh	95
10	Syracuse	90
11	NC State	73
12	Louisville	69
13	California	38
14	Virginia Tech	32
15	Boston College	21

=== Preseason awards ===
Preseason All-ACC Watchlist

Position	Player	Class	School
Goalkeeper	Brennan Klein	Senior	Boston College
Defender	Kevin Carmichael	Senior	California
Defender	Riley Thomas	Graduate Student	North Carolina
Defender	Paul Wise	Senior	Virginia
Defender	Willie Cardona	Senior	Virginia Tech
Midfielder	Joran Gerbet	Senior	Clemson
Midfielder	Ruben Mesalles	Senior	Duke
Midfielder	Sander Roed	Senior	Louisville
Midfielder	Bryce Boneau	Senior	Notre Dame
Midfielder	Guiherme Feitosa	Senior	Pittsburgh
Midfielder	Zach Bohane	Junior	Stanford
Midfielder	Babacar Niang	Senior	Wake Forest
Forward	Hakim Karamoko	Sophomore	NC State
Forward	Bailey Sparks	Senior	SMU
Forward	Nick Kaloukian	Junior	Syracuse

== Regular season ==
Index to colors and formatting
ACC member won
ACC member lost
ACC member tied
ACC teams in **bold**

All times Eastern time.

=== Week 1 (Aug. 19 – Aug. 26) ===
Date	Time (ET)	Visiting team	Home team	Site	Result	Attendance
August 22	5:00 p.m.	Jacksonville	**No. 24 Louisville**	Lynn Stadium • Louisville, KY	**W** 2–0	373
August 22	5:30 p.m.	Iona	**Boston College**	Newton Soccer Complex • Chestnut Hill, MA	**T** 2–2	308
August 22	6:00 p.m.	High Point	**NC State**	Dail Soccer Field • Raleigh, NC	**W** 3–2	2,584
August 22	7:00 p.m.	Penn State	**No. 1 Clemson**	Riggs Field • Clemson, SC	**W** 3–0	4,210
August 22	7:00 p.m.	North Florida	**Virginia Tech**	Thompson Field • Blacksburg, VA	**W** 4–0	550
August 22	7:00 p.m.	Rider	**No. 13 Virginia**	Klöckner Stadium • Charlottesville, VA	**W** 3–0	1,142
August 22	7:00 p.m.	**No. 25 Syracuse**	Colgate	Beyer-Small Field • Hamilton, NY	**W** 1–0	1,123
August 22	7:30 p.m.	Denver	**California**	Edwards Stadium • Berkeley, CA	**L** 1–2	250
August 22	8:00 p.m.	Akron	**No. 2 Notre Dame**	Alumni Stadium • Notre Dame, IN	**T** 1–1	607
August 22	8:00 p.m.	No. 16 Georgetown	**Pittsburgh**	Ambrose Urbanic Field • Pittsburgh, PA	**W** 2–0	2,000
August 22	8:00 p.m.	**No. 6 North Carolina**	UAB	PNC Field • Birmingham, AL	**W** 1–0	421
August 22	8:00 p.m.	VCU	**No. 15 Wake Forest**	Spry Stadium • Winston-Salem, NC	**L** 1–2	2,234
August 22	9:30 p.m.	Air Force	**No. 10 SMU**	Washburne Stadium • Dallas, Texas	**W** 1–0	1,761
August 22	10:00 p.m.	**No. 20 Duke**	San Diego	Torero Stadium • San Diego, CA	**T** 2–2	376
August 22	10:00 p.m.	San Jose State	**No. 5 Stanford**	Cagan Stadium • Stanford, CA	**W** 2–1	927
August 25	4:00 p.m.	Florida Gulf Coast	**NC State**	Dail Soccer Field • Raleigh, NC	**W** 1–0	881
August 25	7:00 p.m.	Central Arkansas	**No. 15 Wake Forest**	Spry Stadium • Winston-Salem, NC	**W** 3–2	2,010
August 25	7:00 p.m.	Colgate	**No. 13 Virginia**	Klöckner Stadium • Charlottesville, VA	**L** 0–1	1,380
August 25	7:00 p.m.	Denver	**No. 5 Stanford**	Cagan Stadium • Stanford, CA	**L** 0–1	1,074
August 25	7:00 p.m.	Mercyhurst	**Pittsburgh**	Ambrose Urbanic Field • Pittsburgh, PA	**W** 2–0	762
August 25	7:00 p.m.	Niagara	**No. 25 Syracuse**	SU Soccer Stadium • Syracuse, NY	**W** 3–0	1,955
August 25	7:00 p.m.	Oral Roberts	**No. 10 SMU**	Washburne Stadium • Dallas, TX	**T** 1–1	1,358
August 25	7:30 p.m.	California Baptist	**No. 6 North Carolina**	Dorrance Field • Chapel Hill, NC	**T** 0–0	3,501
August 25	8:00 p.m.	Sacramento State	**California**	Edwards Stadium • Berkeley, CA	**W** 1–0	473
August 25	9:00 p.m.	**No. 20 Duke**	UC San Diego	Triton Soccer Stadium • San Diego, CA	**W** 3–2	232
August 26	5:30 p.m.	Providence	**Boston College**	Newton Soccer Complex • Chestnut Hill, MA	**T** 1–1	493

Players of the Week

Offensive		Defensive	
Player	Team	Player	Team
Ulfur Bjornsson	Duke	Tomas Hut	Syracuse

=== Week 2 (Aug. 27 – Sep. 2) ===
Date	Time (ET)	Visiting team	Home team	Site	Result	Attendance
August 27	6:00 p.m.	UNC Asheville	**Virginia Tech**	Thompson Field • Blacksburg, VA	**W** 2–0	1,374
August 28	8:00 p.m.	**No. 15 Louisville**	Tulsa	Hurricane Soccer Stadium • Tulsa, OK	**W** 2–1	471
August 29	7:00 p.m.	Charlotte	**No. 7 Syracuse**	SU Soccer Stadium • Syracuse, NY	**T** 2–2	1,124
August 29	7:00 p.m.	Saint Joseph's	**Virginia**	Klöckner Stadium • Charlottesville, VA	**W** 5–0	861
August 29	7:30 p.m.	FIU	**No. 17 North Carolina**	Dorrance Field • Chapel Hill, NC	**W** 3–1	1,801
August 29	8:00 p.m.	**Notre Dame**	Indiana	Armstrong Stadium • Bloomington, IN	**T** 2–2	4,573
August 29	9:30 p.m.	No. 6 Saint Louis	**SMU**	Washburne Stadium • Dallas, TX	**W** 1–0	1,185
August 29	10:00 p.m.	**California**	Loyola Marymount	Sullivan Field • Los Angeles, CA	**L** 0–1	572
August 29	10:00 p.m.	Cal State Fullerton	**No. 13 Stanford**	Cagan Stadium • Stanford, CA	**W** 5–0	518
August 30	7:00 p.m.	**No. 1 Clemson**	South Carolina	Stone Stadium • Columbia, SC	**T** 2–2	6,400
August 30	7:00 p.m.	Dartmouth	**Boston College**	Newton Soccer Complex • Chestnut Hill, MA	**W** 2–1	806
August 30	7:00 p.m.	Grand Canyon	**Duke**	WakeMed Soccer Park • Cary, NC	**L** 2–3	117
August 30	7:00 p.m.	**No. 3 Pittsburgh**	Penn State	Jeffery Field • University Park, PA	**W** 2–1	1,680
August 31	7:00 p.m.	**NC State**	James Madison	Sentara Park • Harrisonburg, VA	**T** 2–2	247
August 31	7:00 p.m.	**Wake Forest**	No. 21 UCF	UCF Soccer and Track Stadium • Orlando, FL	**T** 1–1	1,012
September 1	2:00 p.m.	Averett	**Duke**	Koskinen Stadium • Durham, NC	**W** 14–1	477
September 1	3:00 p.m.	**Boston College**	Merrimack	Martone-Mejail Field • North Andover, MA	**W** 1–0	337
September 1	7:00 p.m.	**No. 3 Pittsburgh**	Penn	Rhodes Field • Philadelphia, PA	**L** 0–1	300
September 1	8:00 p.m.	No. 9 Denver	**SMU**	Washburne Stadium • Dallas, TX	**T** 2–2	1,087
September 1	8:00 p.m.	Saint Mary's	**No. 13 Stanford**	Cagan Stadium • Stanford, CA	**W** 4–1	1,286
September 1	10:00 p.m.	**California**	Cal State Northridge	Matador Soccer Field • Northridge, CA	**W** 1–0	475
September 2	7:00 p.m.	Le Moyne	**No. 7 Syracuse**	SU Soccer Stadium • Syracuse, NY	**L** 0–1	2,134
September 2	7:00 p.m.	Bellarmine	**No. 15 Louisville**	Lynn Stadium • Louisville, KY	**W** 3–1	958
September 2	7:00 p.m.	**Virginia**	Maryland	Ludwig Field • College Park, MD	**T** 1–1	2,402
September 2	7:30 p.m.	East Tennessee State	**No. 17 North Carolina**	Dorrance Field • Chapel Hill, NC	**W** 6–0	1,001
September 2	7:30 p.m.	**Virginia Tech**	No. 23 Kentucky	Bell Soccer Complex • Lexington, KY	**T** 2–2	972

Players of the Week

Offensive		Defensive	
Player	Team	Player	Team
Jaylinn Mitchell	SMU	Moritz Gundelach	Boston College

=== Week 3 (Sep. 3 – Sep. 9) ===
Date	Time (ET)	Visiting team	Home team	Site	Result	Attendance
September 5	5:00 p.m.	Presbyterian	**Virginia Tech**	Thompson Field • Blacksburg, VA	**W** 2–1	732
September 6	6:00 p.m.	**Duke**	**Virginia**	Klöckner Stadium • Charlottesville, VA	**DUKE** 1–0	2,725
September 6	7:00 p.m.	**Notre Dame**	**No. 15 Louisville**	Lynn Stadium • Louisville, KY	**UND** 2–1	1,165
September 6	7:00 p.m.	St. John's	**No. 12 North Carolina**	Dorrance Field • Chapel Hill, NC	**T** 2–2	1,202
September 6	7:00 p.m.	**No. 5 Stanford**	**No. 2 Clemson**	Riggs Field • Clemson, SC	**STAN** 3–2	6,179
September 6	7:00 p.m.	**No. 20 Syracuse**	**Boston College**	Newton Soccer Complex • Chestnut Hill, MA	**T** 1–1	1,026
September 6	7:00 p.m.	**Wake Forest**	Gardner–Webb	Greene–Harbison Stadium • Boiling Springs, NC	**L** 1–3	350
September 6	8:00 p.m.	**California**	**NC State**	Dail Soccer Field • Raleigh, NC	**NCST** 2–1	1,876
September 7	7:00 p.m.	**No. 8 Pittsburgh**	**No. 22 SMU**	Washburne Stadium • Dallas, TX	**PITT** 3–1	913
September 8	4:00 p.m.	**Virginia Tech**	Furman	Stone Stadium • Greenville, SC	**W** 3–0	502
September 9	7:00 p.m.	Radford	**Wake Forest**	Spry Stadium • Winston-Salem, NC	**W** 1–0	1,090
September 9	7:30 p.m.	**No. 15 Louisville**	No. 16 Kentucky	Bell Soccer Complex • Lexington, KY	**W** 1–0	1,439

Players of the Week

Offensive		Defensive	
Player	Team	Player	Team
Shane de Flores	Stanford	Jacob Bartlett	Notre Dame

=== Week 4 (Sep. 10 – Sep. 16) ===
Date	Time (ET)	Visiting team	Home team	Site	Result	Attendance
September 10	6:00 p.m.	Winthrop	**No. 24 NC State**	Dail Soccer Field • Raleigh, NC	**W** 7–0	383
September 10	7:00 p.m.	Loyola (MD)	**No. 5 Clemson**	Riggs Field • Clemson, SC	**W** 6–0	2,557
September 10	8:00 p.m.	Duquesne	**No. 23 Notre Dame**	Alumni Stadium • Notre Dame, IN	**T** 1–1	306
September 10	10:00 p.m.	UC Riverside	**No. 3 Stanford**	Cagan Stadium • Stanford, CA	**W** 3–0	752
September 13	6:00 p.m.	Stetson	**No. 24 NC State**	Dail Soccer Field • Raleigh, NC	**T** 1–1	1,307
September 13	7:00 p.m.	**No. 5 Clemson**	**Boston College**	Newton Soccer Complex • Chestnut Hill, MA	**CLEM** 1–0	1,017
September 13	7:00 p.m.	**Louisville**	**No. 7 Pittsburgh**	Ambrose Urbanic Field • Pittsburgh, PA	**PITT** 3–2	1,207
September 13	7:00 p.m.	**No. 11 North Carolina**	**Duke**	Koskinen Stadium • Durham, NC	**UNC** 2–1	4,000
September 13	7:00 p.m.	**SMU**	**California**	Edwards Stadium • Berkeley, CA	**SMU** 2–1	429
September 13	7:00 p.m.	**Virginia**	**Wake Forest**	Spry Stadium • Winston-Salem, NC	**T** 1–1	2,440
September 13	7:30 p.m.	**No. 17 Virginia Tech**	**Syracuse**	SU Soccer Stadium • Syracuse, NY	**VT** 2–0	1,726
September 14	7:00 p.m.	**No. 3 Stanford**	**No. 23 Notre Dame**	Alumni Stadium • Notre Dame, IN	**STAN** 1–0	1,172
September 16	6:00 p.m.	**No. 5 Clemson**	Holy Cross	Smith Soccer Stadium • Worcester, MA	**T** 2–2	2,573
September 16	6:00 p.m.	Dominican	**California**	Edwards Stadium • Berkeley, CA	**W** 5–0	234
September 16	8:00 p.m.	Incarnate Word	**SMU**	Washburne Stadium • Dallas, TX	**W** 2–0	446

Players of the Week

Offensive		Defensive	
Player	Team	Player	Team
Martin Vician	North Carolina	Cooper Wenzel	Virginia Tech

=== Week 5 (Sep. 17 – Sep. 23) ===
Date	Time (ET)	Visiting team	Home team	Site	Result	Attendance
September 17	5:30 p.m.	Siena	**Boston College**	Newton Soccer Complex • Chestnut Hill, MA	**W** 3–1	642
September 17	6:00 p.m.	UNC Wilmington	**No. 18 NC State**	Dail Soccer Field • Raleigh, NC	**W** 4–1	457
September 17	7:00 p.m.	Canisius	**Syracuse**	SU Soccer Stadium • Syracuse, NY	**W** 5–1	657
September 17	7:00 p.m.	No. 14 Elon	**Wake Forest**	Spry Stadium • Winston-Salem, NC	**T** 1–1	871
September 17	7:00 p.m.	**No. 2 Pittsburgh**	Cleveland State	Krenzler Field • Cleveland, OH	**W** 4–0	247
September 18	10:00 p.m.	UC Davis	**No. 1 Stanford**	Cagan Stadium • Stanford, CA	**W** 1–0	967
September 20	7:00 p.m.	**Boston College**	**No. 2 Pittsburgh**	Ambrose Urbanic Field • Pittsburgh, PA	**PITT** 2–0	1,007
September 20	7:00 p.m.	Chicago State	**Notre Dame**	Alumni Stadium • Notre Dame, IN	**W** 6–1	1,233
September 20	7:00 p.m.	**No. 18 NC State**	**No. 6 North Carolina**	Dorrance Field • Chapel Hill, NC	**UNC** 2–0	3,601
September 20	7:00 p.m.	**Syracuse**	**Louisville**	Lynn Stadium • Louisville, KY	**T** 1–1	922
September 20	7:30 p.m.	**Wake Forest**	**No. 4 Clemson**	Riggs Field • Clemson, SC	**CLEM** 1–0	6,222
September 20	8:00 p.m.	**No. 13 Virginia Tech**	**SMU**	Washburne Stadium • Dallas, TX	**SMU** 2–0	627
September 21	7:00 p.m.	**Virginia**	**California**	Edwards Stadium • Berkeley, CA	**T** 1–1	710
September 22	10:00 p.m.	**Duke**	**No. 1 Stanford**	Cagan Stadium • Stanford, CA	**T** 2–2	2,268

Players of the Week

Offensive		Defensive	
Player	Team	Player	Team
Fletcher Bank	Stanford	Kyran Chambron Pinho	SMU
Daniel Burko	Syracuse	Kyran Chambron Pinho	SMU

=== Week 6 (Sep. 24 – Sep. 30) ===
Date	Time (ET)	Visiting team	Home team	Site	Result	Attendance
September 24	6:00 p.m.	**Boston College**	Boston University	Nickerson Field • Boston, MA	**T** 1–1	285
September 24	7:00 p.m.	Cornell	**Syracuse**	SU Soccer Stadium • Syracuse, NY	**L** 0–1	365
September 24	7:00 p.m.	Detroit Mercy	**Notre Dame**	Alumni Stadium • Notre Dame, IN	**W** 3–1	203
September 24	7:00 p.m.	Liberty	**No. 12 Clemson**	Riggs Field • Clemson, SC	**W** 1–0	2,551
September 24	7:00 p.m.	Mercer	**No. 3 North Carolina**	Dorrance Field • Chapel Hill, NC	**T** 0–0	601
September 24	7:00 p.m.	UAB	**Louisville**	Lynn Stadium • Louisville, KY	**L** 1–2	387
September 25	8:00 p.m.	FIU	**No. 16 SMU**	Washburne Stadium • Dallas, TX	**T** 1–1	432
September 27	6:00 p.m.	**Duke**	**NC State**	Dail Soccer Field • Raleigh, NC	**DUKE** 2–1	3,081
September 27	7:00 p.m.	**No. 12 Clemson**	**Notre Dame**	Alumni Stadium • Notre Dame, IN	**UND** 2–1	2,820
September 27	7:00 p.m.	**Wake Forest**	**Syracuse**	SU Soccer Stadium • Syracuse, NY	**WAKE** 2–1	1,687
September 27	7:30 p.m.	**No. 2 Stanford**	**Virginia**	Klöckner Stadium • Charlottesville, VA	**STAN** 1–0	1,446
September 28	7:00 p.m.	**California**	**No. 3 North Carolina**	Dorrance Field • Chapel Hill, NC	**UNC** 2–1	1,801
September 28	7:00 p.m.	**No. 1 Pittsburgh**	**No. 17 Virginia Tech**	Thompson Field • Blacksburg, VA	**PITT** 2–0	1,845
September 29	3:00 p.m.	**Louisville**	**Boston College**	Newton Soccer Complex • Chestnut Hill, MA	**T** 1–1	668
September 29	8:00 p.m.	UTRGV	**No. 16 SMU**	Washburne Stadium • Dallas, TX	**W** 3–2	602

Players of the Week

Offensive		Defensive	
Player	Team	Player	Team
Matthew Roou	Notre Dame	Casper Svendby	Pittsburgh

=== Week 7 (Oct. 1 – Oct. 7) ===
Date	Time (ET)	Visiting team	Home team	Site	Result	Attendance
October 1	7:00 p.m.	East Tennessee State	**Wake Forest**	Spry Stadium • Winston-Salem, NC	**W** 2–0	852
October 1	7:00 p.m.	Queens	**No. 19 Virginia Tech**	Thompson Field • Blacksburg, VA	**W** 4–0	275
October 1	7:00 p.m.	**Syracuse**	Albany	Ford Field • Albany, NY	**W** 3–1	1,216
October 1	7:00 p.m.	Trine	**Notre Dame**	Alumni Stadium • Notre Dame, IN	**W** 7–1	254
October 1	7:00 p.m.	UNC Greensboro	**Virginia**	Klöckner Stadium • Charlottesville, VA	**L** 1–2	877
October 2	7:00 p.m.	Howard	**No. 1 Pittsburgh**	Ambrose Urbanic Field • Pittsburgh, PA	**W** 8–1	897
October 3	6:00 p.m.	**Louisville**	**California**	Edwards Stadium • Berkeley, CA	**T** 3–3	230
October 4	7:00 p.m.	**No. 3 North Carolina**	**No. 24 Clemson**	Riggs Field • Clemson, SC	**CLEM** 3–2	4,095
October 4	7:00 p.m.	**No. 16 SMU**	**No. 18 Duke**	Koskinen Stadium • Durham, NC	**T** 2–2	734
October 4	7:00 p.m.	**No. 19 Virginia Tech**	**Virginia**	Klöckner Stadium • Charlottesville, VA	**UVA** 2–1	2,813
October 4	9:30 p.m.	**NC State**	**No. 2 Stanford**	Cagan Stadium • Stanford, CA	**T** 0–0	1,576
October 5	7:00 p.m.	**Boston College**	**Wake Forest**	Spry Stadium • Winston-Salem, NC	**WAKE** 2–0	1,713
October 5	7:00 p.m.	**Notre Dame**	**Syracuse**	SU Soccer Stadium • Syracuse, NY	**CUSE** 2–1	1,701
October 7	7:00 p.m.	No. 6 Denver	**No. 1 Pittsburgh**	Ambrose Urbanic Field • Pittsburgh, PA	**W** 2–0	1,239

Players of the Week

Offensive		Defensive	
Player	Team	Player	Team
Joran Gerbet	Clemson	Logan Erb	NC State
Joran Gerbet	Clemson	Joey Batrouni	Virginia

=== Week 8 (Oct. 8 – Oct. 14) ===
Date	Time (ET)	Visiting team	Home team	Site	Result	Attendance
October 8	7:00 p.m.	College of Charleston	**No. 7 North Carolina**	Dorrance Field • Chapel Hill, NC	**W** 3–0	601
October 8	7:00 p.m.	**No. 16 Duke**	Elon	Rudd Field • Elon, NC	**W** 2–1	898
October 8	7:00 p.m.	No. 8 James Madison	**Virginia**	Klöckner Stadium • Charlottesville, VA	**W** 1–0	1,345
October 8	7:00 p.m.	Lipscomb	**Louisville**	Lynn Stadium • Louisville, KY	**W** 4–2	621
October 8	7:00 p.m.	Michigan	**Notre Dame**	Alumni Stadium • Notre Dame, IN	**L** 0–1	1,089
October 8	7:00 p.m.	**Syracuse**	Providence	Chapey Field • Providence, RI	**W** 2–1	1,750
October 8	7:00 p.m.	Wofford	**Wake Forest**	Spry Stadium • Winston-Salem, NC	**T** 0–0	1,117
October 11	6:00 p.m.	**NC State**	**No. 24 Virginia Tech**	Thompson Field • Blacksburg, VA	**T** 0–0	1,305
October 11	7:00 p.m.	**California**	**No. 1 Pittsburgh**	Ambrose Urbanic Field • Pittsburgh, PA	**CAL** 1–0	1,594
October 11	7:00 p.m.	**No. 7 North Carolina**	**Notre Dame**	Alumni Stadium • Notre Dame, IN	**T** 1–1	3,108
October 11	7:00 p.m.	**Virginia**	**Boston College**	Newton Soccer Complex • Chestnut Hill, MA	**UVA** 1–0	250
October 11	8:00 p.m.	**No. 12 Clemson**	**Louisville**	Lynn Stadium • Louisville, KY	**CLEM** 3–2	850
October 11	8:00 p.m.	**No. 5 Stanford**	**No. 15 SMU**	Washburne Stadium • Dallas, TX	**T** 2–2	1,512
October 12	7:00 p.m.	**Wake Forest**	**No. 16 Duke**	Koskinen Stadium • Durham, NC	**T** 0–0	1,129
October 14	7:00 p.m.	High Point	**No. 1 Pittsburgh**	Ambrose Urbanic Field • Pittsburgh, PA	**L** 0–1	624

Players of the Week

Offensive		Defensive	
Player	Team	Player	Team
Nonso Adimabua	California	Marco Brougher	California

=== Week 9 (Oct. 15 – Oct. 21) ===
Date	Time (ET)	Visiting team	Home team	Site	Result	Attendance
October 15	6:00 p.m.	No. 21 Hofstra	**No. 23 NC State**	Dail Soccer Field • Raleigh, NC	**T** 1–1	337
October 15	6:00 p.m.	**No. 7 North Carolina**	William & Mary	Albert–Daly Field • Williamsburg, VA	**W** 5–2	1,008
October 15	6:00 p.m.	**Wake Forest**	UNC Wilmington	UNCW Soccer Stadium • Wilmington, NC	**W** 4–1	1,067
October 15	7:00 p.m.	American	**Virginia**	Klöckner Stadium • Charlottesville, VA	**W** 4–2	1,350
October 15	7:00 p.m.	Loyola (MD)	**Syracuse**	SU Soccer Stadium • Syracuse, NY	Cancelled	
October 15	7:00 p.m.	Queens	**No. 8 Clemson**	Riggs Field • Clemson, SC	**W** 4–2	2,091
October 15	7:00 p.m.	Winthrop	**Virginia Tech**	Thompson Field • Blacksburg, VA	**W** 6–0	238
October 15	8:00 p.m.	Central Arkansas	**No. 10 SMU**	Washburne Stadium • Dallas, TX	**W** 1–0	356
October 16	7:00 p.m.	Evansville	**Louisville**	Lynn Stadium • Louisville, KY	**T** 2–2	535
October 16	7:00 p.m.	Howard	**No. 11 Duke**	Koskinen Stadium • Durham, NC	**W** 10–0	392
October 17	10:00 p.m.	**No. 2 Stanford**	San Francisco	Negoesco Stadium • San Francisco, CA	**L** 0–2	1,500
October 18	10:00 p.m.	**California**	Portland	Merlo Field • Portland, OR	**L** 0–2	836
October 19	6:00 p.m.	**No. 4 Pittsburgh**	**No. 7 North Carolina**	Dorrance Field • Chapel Hill, NC	**PITT** 2–1	2,125
October 19	6:00 p.m.	**No. 10 SMU**	**No. 23 NC State**	Dail Soccer Field • Raleigh, NC	**NCST** 5–1	776
October 19	7:00 p.m.	**Boston College**	**Notre Dame**	Alumni Stadium • Notre Dame, IN	**T** 1–1	828
October 19	7:00 p.m.	**Syracuse**	**Virginia**	Klöckner Stadium • Charlottesville, VA	**UVA** 3–0	2,202
October 19	7:00 p.m.	**Virginia Tech**	**Wake Forest**	Spry Stadium • Winston-Salem, NC	**WAKE** 2–1	1,486
October 21	10:00 p.m.	Pacific	**No. 2 Stanford**	Cagan Stadium • Stanford, CA	**T** 1–1	1,566

Players of the Week

Offensive		Defensive	
Player	Team	Player	Team
Arnau Vilamitjana	Pittsburgh	Daniel Krueger	Wake Forest

=== Week 10 (Oct. 22 – Oct. 28) ===
Date	Time (ET)	Visiting team	Home team	Site	Result	Attendance
October 22	6:00 p.m.	Saint Mary's	**California**	Edwards Stadium • Berkeley, CA	**W** 4–2	227
October 22	7:00 p.m.	Milwaukee	**Louisville**	Lynn Stadium • Louisville, KY	**W** 4–0	435
October 22	7:00 p.m.	Queens	**No. 10 Duke**	Koskinen Stadium • Durham, NC	**W** 5–0	447
October 22	7:00 p.m.	UIC	**Notre Dame**	Alumni Stadium • Notre Dame, IN	**W** 5–0	304
October 22	7:00 p.m.	USC Upstate	**No. 3 Clemson**	Riggs Field • Clemson, SC	**W** 6–0	2,214
October 23	5:00 p.m.	**No. 19 NC State**	William & Mary	Albert–Daly Field • Williamsburg, VA	**W** 4–2	857
October 25	6:00 p.m.	**No. 10 Duke**	**Virginia Tech**	Thompson Field • Blacksburg, VA	**DUKE** 1–0	1,564
October 25	7:00 p.m.	**Virginia**	**No. 5 Pittsburgh**	Ambrose Urbanic Field • Pittsburgh, PA	**PITT** 4–1	1,601
October 25	8:00 p.m.	**Syracuse**	**No. 3 Clemson**	Riggs Field • Clemson, SC	**CLEM** 6–1	2,012
October 25	8:00 p.m.	**Wake Forest**	**No. 21 SMU**	Washburne Stadium • Dallas, TX	**SMU** 3–0	1,283
October 26	7:00 p.m.	Stony Brook	**Boston College**	Newton Soccer Complex • Chestnut Hill, MA	**W** 4–2	303
October 27	6:00 p.m.	**Louisville**	**No. 19 NC State**	Dail Soccer Field • Raleigh, NC	**NCST** 1–0	734
October 27	7:00 p.m.	**Notre Dame**	**California**	Edwards Stadium • Berkeley, CA	**UND** 2–0	1,587
October 27	8:00 p.m.	**No. 11 North Carolina**	**No. 7 Stanford**	Cagan Stadium • Stanford, CA	**UNC** 2–1	1,984

Players of the Week

Offensive		Defensive	
Player	Team	Player	Team
Alex Meinhard	Clemson	Kyle Genenbacher	Notre Dame
Alex Meinhard	Clemson	Kyran Chambron Pinho	SMU

=== Week 11 (Oct. 29 – Nov. 5) ===
Date	Time (ET)	Visiting team	Home team	Site	Result	Attendance
October 29	6:00 p.m.	Davidson	Virginia Tech	Thompson Field • Blacksburg, VA	**T** 2–2	582
October 29	7:00 p.m.	Longwood	No. 5 Duke	Koskinen Stadium • Durham, NC	**W** 4–1	271
October 29	7:00 p.m.	Wofford	No. 2 Clemson	Riggs Field • Clemson, SC	**W** 2–1	2,326
October 30	3:00 p.m.	Mary Washington	Virginia	Klöckner Stadium • Charlottesville, VA	**W** 4–2	1,160
November 1	6:00 p.m.	**No. 2 Clemson**	Virginia Tech	Thompson Field • Blacksburg, VA	**T** 2–2	1,127
November 1	7:00 p.m.	**Boston College**	No. 8 North Carolina	Dorrance Field • Chapel Hill, NC	**BC** 1–0	1,901
November 1	7:00 p.m.	**No. 12 NC State**	Wake Forest	Spry Stadium • Winston-Salem, NC	**WAKE** 1–0	1,825
November 1	7:00 p.m.	**Notre Dame**	No. 5 Duke	Koskinen Stadium • Durham, NC	**DUKE** 4–0	1,089
November 1	7:00 p.m.	**No. 3 Pittsburgh**	Syracuse	SU Soccer Stadium • Syracuse, NY	**CUSE** 2–0	954
November 1	7:00 p.m.	**No. 20 SMU**	Louisville	Lynn Stadium • Louisville, KY	**SMU** 3–2	430
November 1	10:00 p.m.	**California**	No. 22 Stanford	Cagan Stadium • Stanford, CA	**CAL** 1–0	1,834

Players of the Week

Offensive		Defensive	
Player	Team	Player	Team
Marci Killeen	Boston College	Brennan Klein	Boston College
Marci Killeen	Boston College	Kevin Carmichael	California

== Rankings ==
=== United Soccer Coaches ===
Legend
Increase in ranking
Decrease in ranking
Not ranked previous week

	Pre	Wk 1	Wk 2	Wk 3	Wk 4	Wk 5	Wk 6	Wk 7	Wk 8	Wk 9	Wk 10	Wk 11	Final
Boston College													
California													
Clemson	1	1 (7)	2 (1)	5	4	12	24	12	8	3	2	7	9
Duke	20	RV					18	16	11	10	5	2	15
Louisville	24	15	15										
NC State				24	18	RV		RV	23	19	12	21	14
North Carolina	6	17	12	11	6	3	3	7	7	11	8	14	RV
Notre Dame	2	RV		23	RV		RV						
Pittsburgh		3	8	7	2	1 (8)	1 (8)	1 (8)	4	5	3	9	7
SMU	10		22	RV	RV	16	16	15	10	21	20	15	5
Stanford	5	13	5	3	1 (8)	2	2	5	2	7	22	RV	13
Syracuse	25	7	20										
Virginia	13									RV			17
Virginia Tech		RV	RV	17	13	17	19	24	RV				
Wake Forest	15												6

=== Top Drawer Soccer ===
Legend
Increase in ranking
Decrease in ranking
Not ranked previous week

	Pre	Wk 1	Wk 2	Wk 3	Wk 4	Wk 5	Wk 6	Wk 7	Wk 8	Wk 9	Wk 10	Wk 11	Wk 12	Wk 13	Wk 14	Wk 15	Final
Boston College																	
California																	
Clemson	1	1	6	10	7	12	17	11	9	9	6	7	3	6	5	11	11
Duke	20	23		17	20	13	10	9	11	10	8	3	10	15	20	20	20
Louisville																	
North Carolina	7	14	13	18	13	5	9	12	12	14	9	14	19	21			
NC State										25	23	24			14	15	15
Notre Dame	2	8	7	8	17	17	5	13	17								
Pittsburgh		10	12	6	5	3	3	2	5	6	3	6	14	17	8	5	6
SMU	10	16	5	9	6	4	6	8	4	11	11	9	17	18	9	6	7
Stanford	4	6	3	3	2	2	2	4	3	4	13				16	16	16
Syracuse	24	15	21														
Virginia	8	20	17										20		12	14	14
Virginia Tech				21	15	16	20										
Wake Forest	19											22	16	5	4	2	5

== Postseason ==
=== ACC Tournament ===
Semifinals
9	Virginia	1
5	Wake Forest	5
11	California	2
2	Clemson	3

Final
5	Wake Forest (pen.)	1 (7)
2	Clemson	1 (6)

=== NCAA tournament ===
Seed	School	First round	2nd Round	3rd Round	Quarterfinals	Semifinals	Championship
2	Pittsburgh	BYE	W 1–0 vs Cornell – (Pittsburgh)	W 3–2 vs. Kansas City – (Pittsburgh)	L 0–2 vs. Vermont – (Pittsburgh)		
8	Wake Forest	BYE	W 2–1 vs Maryland – (Winston-Salem)	W 2–1 ^{OT} vs. #9 Clemson – (Winston-Salem)	L 0–3 @ #1 Ohio State – (Columbus)		
9	Clemson	BYE	W 2–0 vs Providence – (Clemson)	L 1–2 ^{OT} @ #8 Wake Forest – (Winston-Salem)			
10	Duke	BYE	L 0–1 vs San Diego – (Durham)				
11	Virginia	BYE	W 2–1 vs West Virginia – (Charlottesville)	L 0–1 vs. UMass – (Charlottesville)			
12	SMU	BYE	W 2–1 vs Washington – (Dallas)	W 3–1 @ #5 Dayton – (Dayton)	L 2–3 vs. #13 Marshall – (Dallas)		
16	Stanford	BYE	T 2–2 (6–5 PKs) vs UC Santa Barbara – (Stanford)	T 0–0 (2–4 PKs) @ #1 Ohio State – (Columbus)			
	NC State	W 2–1 vs Charlotte – (Raleigh)	W 2–0 @ #4 Georgetown – (Washington)	L 1–2 @ #13 Marshall – (Huntington)			
	North Carolina	T 0–0 (3–5 PKs) vs Furman – (Chapel Hill)					
	W–L (%):	1–0–1 (.750)	6–1–1 (.813)	3–3–1 (.500)	0–3–0 (.000)	0–0–0 (–)	0–0–0 (–) Total: 10–7–3 (.575)

=== Awards ===
==== All-ACC awards and teams ====
2024 ACC Men's Soccer Individual Awards
Award	Recipient(s)
Coach of the Year	Jay Vidovich – Pittsburgh
Offensive Player of the Year	Matthew Roou – Notre Dame
Midfielder of the Year	Joran Gerbet – Clemson
Defensive Player of the Year	Casper Svendby – Pittsburgh
Goalkeeper of the Year	Wessel Speel – Duke
Freshman of the Year	Ransford Gyan – Clemson

2024 ACC Men's Soccer All-Conference Teams
First Team	Second Team	Third Team	All-Freshman Team
Joran Gerbet – Clemson; Alex Meinhard – Clemson; Ulfur Bjornsson – Duke; Wessel Speel – Duke; Riley Thomas – North Carolina; Matthew Roou – Notre Dame; Guilherme Feitosa – Pittsburgh; Luis Sahmkow – Pittsburgh; Casper Svendby – Pittsburgh; Bailey Sparks – SMU; Zach Bohane – Stanford	Ask Ekeland – Boston College; Kevin Carmichael – California; Ransford Gyan – Clemson; Adam Luckhurst – Duke; Martin Vician – North Carolina; Taig Healy – NC State; Hakim Karamoko – NC State; Casper Grening – Pittsburgh; Nick Dang – Virginia; Trace Alphin – Wake Forest; Cooper Flax – Wake Forest	Nonso Adimabua – California; Kamran Acito – Duke; Kenan Hot – Duke; Ruben Mesalles – Duke; Gage Guerra – Louisville; Josh Jones – Louisville; Sam Williams – North Carolina; Bryce Boneau – Notre Dame; Cabral Carter – Pittsburgh; Jackson Gilman – Pittsburgh; Kyran Chambron Pinho – SMU	Ransford Gyan – Clemson; Lukas Magnason – Clemson; Wahabu Musah – Clemson; Jamie Kabuusu – Duke; Tate Johnson – North Carolina; Nikola Markovic – NC State; Lasse Dahl – Pittsburgh; Niklas Soerensen – Pittsburgh; Chimere Omeze – Syracuse; Olafur Floki Stephensen – Virginia Tech; Dylan Borso – Wake Forest

== MLS SuperDraft ==
=== Total picks by school ===
Team	Round 1	Round 2	Round 3	Total
Boston College	–	–	1	1
California	–	1	–	1
Clemson	1	1	2	4
Duke	–	–	–	–
Louisville	–	–	–	–
NC State	1	–	1	2
North Carolina	1	2	–	3
Notre Dame	–	–	–	–
Pittsburgh	–	1	–	1
Stanford	–	–	–	–
SMU	–	3	–	3
Syracuse	–	–	–	–
Virginia	–	1	1	2
Virginia Tech	–	–	–	–
Wake Forest	–	3	1	4
Total	3	12	6	21

=== List of selections ===
Round	Pick #	MLS team	Player	Position	College
1	10	D.C. United	(United States) Hakim Karamoko	FW	NC State
1	15	Vancouver Whitecaps FC	(United States) Tate Johnson	DF	North Carolina
1	27	Orlando City SC	(France) Joran Gerbet	MF	Clemson
2	33	Chicago Fire FC	(United States) Travis Smith Jr.	DF	Wake Forest
2	38	Colorado Rapids	(Australia) Charlie Harper	DF	North Carolina
2	39	Toronto FC	(United States) Michael Sullivan	MF	Pittsburgh
2	42	Austin FC	(United States) Riley Thomas	DF	North Carolina
2	44	CF Montréal	(United States) Arik Duncan	FW	California
2	45	Vancouver Whitecaps FC	(United States) Nikola Djordjevic	DF	SMU
2	46	Orlando City SC	(United States) Titus Sandy Jr	DF	Clemson
2	48	Houston Dynamo FC	(United States) Bo Cummins	DF	Wake Forest
2	49	Real Salt Lake	(United States) Nick Dang	DF	Virginia
2	51	Columbus Crew	(United States) Cesar Ruvalcaba	DF	SMU
2	52	Inter Miami CF	(United States) Bailey Sparks	MF	SMU
2	59	Real Salt Lake	(United States) Trace Alphin	GK	Wake Forest
3	62	Colorado Rapids	(Saint Lucia) Donavan Phillip	FW	NC State
3	65	New England Revolution	(United States) C. J. Williams	DF	Boston College
3	68	Colorado Rapids	(United States) Shawn Smart	DF	Clemson
3	73	CF Montréal	(France) Arthur Duquenne	DF	Clemson
3	78	New York City FC	(Denmark) A. J. Smith	FW	Virginia
3	79	Real Salt Lake	(United States) Liam O'Gara	MF	Wake Forest

== Homegrown players ==
The Homegrown Player Rule is a Major League Soccer program that allows MLS teams to sign local players from their own development academies directly to MLS first team rosters. Before the creation of the rule in 2008, every player entering Major League Soccer had to be assigned through one of the existing MLS player allocation processes, such as the MLS SuperDraft.

To place a player on its homegrown player list, making him eligible to sign as a homegrown player, players must have resided in that club's home territory and participated in the club's youth development system for at least one year. Players can play college soccer and still be eligible to sign a homegrown contract.

Original MLS team	Player	Pos.	School	Ref.
Atlanta United FC	(United States) Will Reilly	MF	Stanford	
Chicago Fire FC	(United States) Dylan Borso	MF	Wake Forest	
