= 2024 Wake Forest Demon Deacons men's soccer team =

American college soccer season

2024 Wake Forest Demon Deacons men's soccer

NCAA Tournament, Quarterfinals
- Conference: Atlantic Coast Conference
- U. Soc. Coaches poll: No. 6
- TopDrawerSoccer.com: No. 5
- Record: 12–5–7 (4–2–2 ACC)
- Head coach: Bobby Muuss (10th season)
- Assistant coaches: Steve Armas (10th season); Dane Brenner (14th season); Ade Taiwo (2nd season)
- Home stadium: Spry Stadium

2024 ACC men's soccer standings
	Conf.					Overall
Team	W		L		T	W		L		T
No. 7 Pittsburgh +	6	–	2	–	0	14	–	6	–	0
No. 9 Clemson +	5	–	2	–	1	15	–	3	–	4
No. 15 Duke +	4	–	1	–	3	11	–	4	–	4
No. 6 Wake Forest ‡	4	–	2	–	2	12	–	5	–	7
No. 5 SMU +	4	–	2	–	2	12	–	3	–	6
North Carolina +	4	–	3	–	1	9	–	4	–	5
No. 13 Stanford +	3	–	2	–	3	9	–	5	–	6
No. 17 Virginia +	3	–	3	–	2	11	–	7	–	3
No. 14 NC State +	3	–	3	–	2	10	–	5	–	5
Notre Dame	3	–	3	–	2	7	–	5	–	5
Syracuse	2	–	4	–	2	7	–	7	–	3
California	2	–	4	–	2	8	–	8	–	2
Boston College	1	–	4	–	3	5	–	5	–	6
Virginia Tech	1	–	5	–	2	7	–	6	–	4
Louisville	0	–	5	–	3	6	–	7	–	4
‡ – ACC tournament champion + – At-large invitation to the 2024 NCAA tournament; As of December 17, 2024; Rankings from United Soccer Coaches; Source: The ACC

The 2024 Wake Forest Demon Deacons men's soccer team represented Wake Forest University during the 2024 NCAA Division I men's soccer season. It was the 78th season of the university fielding a program. It was the program's tenth season with Bobby Muuss as head coach. The Demon Deacons played their home matches at Spry Stadium.

The Demon Deacons started the season ranked fifteenth, but had a disappointing opening week losing 2–1 to VCU and defeating Central Arkansas 3–2. The results saw them fall out of the national rankings. They followed that with a streak of games where they went 1–1–1, with the tie coming against number 21 UCF. They also tied their ACC opener against Virginia and drew 1–1 with fourteenth ranked Elon. They followed those two draws with a loss to fourth ranked Clemson. A defeat of Syracuse saw the Demon Deacons achieve a 3–3–3 overall record, and a 1–1–1 ACC record. They then went on a seven-game unbeaten run, which included two ACC wins over Boston College and Virginia Tech and a draw against sixteenth ranked Duke. They finished the season with a defeat at twenty first ranked SMU and a defeat of twelfth ranked NC State.

The Demon Deacons finished the regular season 8–4–5 overall and 4–2–2 in ACC play to finish in a tie for fourth place. As the fifth overall seed in the ACC Tournament hosted Syracuse in the First Round. They defeated the Orange 2–1, the same result as in the regular season to move on. Next was a re-match against fourth seed and fifteenth ranked SMU, where the teams drew 2–2. The Demon Deacons advanced via penalty shoot-out. In the Semifinals, Wake Forest won a regular season rematch with Virginia 5–1 to advance to the final. In a re-match with Clemson, the two teams drew, and Wake won the championship in another penalty shoot-out. They received the ACC's automatic bid to the NCAA Tournament. They were the eighth overall seed earned a bye into the Second Round. There they defeated Maryland 2–1 to set-up a Third Round rematch with Clemson. The match again went into overtime, but this time Wake scored in the overtime period to avoid a penalty shoot-out. The Demon Deacon's run ended in the Quarterfinals where they lost to top seed, and number one ranked, Ohio State 3–0. The Demon Deacons finished with a 12–5–7 overall record and were ranked sixth in the final United Soccer Coaches poll.

== Background ==
The Demon Deacons finished the season 11–3–5 overall and 4–1–3 in ACC play to finish in first place in the Atlantic Division. As the second overall seed in the ACC Tournament they earned a by into the Second Round where they lost to North Carolina. They received an at-large bid to the NCAA Tournament. They were the tenth overall seed and lost to Indiana in overtime in the Second Round to end their season.

== Player movement ==
=== Players leaving ===
Departures
Name	Number	Pos.	Height	Weight	Year	Hometown	Reason for departure
Alec Kenison	4	DF	5'9"	153	Sophomore	San Diego, California	Transferred to Northeastern
Samuel Jones	5	DF	6'0"	175	Sophomore	Portsmouth, Virginia	—
Aethan Yohannes	6	MF	6'0"	175	Sophomore	Springfield, Virginia	—
Roald Mitchell	9	FW	6'2"	170	Junior	Montclair, New Jersey	Signed with New York Red Bulls
Oscar Sears	10	MF	5'8"	150	Senior	Stockholm, Sweden	Graduated
Leo Guarino	11	FW	5'10"	155	Junior	East Rockaway, New York	Transferred to Boston College
Jahlane Forbes	14	MF	6'0"	165	Senior	Clermont, Florida	Graduated; Selected 38th overall in the 2024 MLS SuperDraft
Mwinso Denkabe	15	FW	5'9"	165	Junior	Los Altos, California	—
Hosei Kijima	16	MF	5'10"	165	Senior	Yokohama, Japan	Graduated; Selected 17th overall in the 2024 MLS SuperDraft
Camilo Ponce	17	MF	5'9"	161	Sophomore	Amityville, New York	Signed with FC Tulsa
Jake Swallen	24	MF	5'10"	180	(redshirt) Senior	Shoreview, Minnesota	Graduated
Chase Oliver	25	MF	5'9"	155	Senior	Kennesaw, Georgia	Graduated
Devin Armstrong	30	GK	6'2"	165	(redshirt) Freshman	Palm Harbor, Florida	Transferred to NJIT
Garrison Tubbs	32	DF	6'3"	175	Senior	Brunswick, Georgia	Graduated; Signed with Atlanta United FC
Pranav DuBroff	34	DF	5'10"	174	Freshman	Frisco, Texas	—

=== Players arriving ===
==== Incoming transfers ====
Incoming transfers
Name	Number	Pos.	Height	Weight	Year	Hometown	Previous school
Pierce Bateson	17	MF	5'9"	152	Sophomore	Madison, New Jersey	Connecticut

==== Recruiting class ====
Name	Nat.	Hometown	Club	TDS Rating
Owen Barnett; GK	USA	Atlanta, Georgia	Atlanta United FC Academy	3/5 stars
Ryan Belal; FW	USA	Baltimore, Maryland	FC Cincinnati 2	3/5 stars
Dylan Borso; MF	USA	Chicago, Illinois	Chicago Fire Academy	4/5 stars
Jojo Davila; DF	USA	Valrico, Florida	Orlando City SC Academy	3/5 stars
Will Jackson; DF	USA	Homewood, Alabama	Kiwanis Club	3/5 stars
Daniel Krueger; DF	USA	Philadelphia, Pennsylvania	Philadelphia Union Academy	4/5 stars
Pariss Mitchell; FW	CAN	Markham, Ontario	Colorado Rapids 2	N/A
Mason Sullivan; DF	USA	West Roxbury, Massachusetts	New England Revolution Academy	3/5 stars
Amoni Thomas; DF	CAN	Edmonton, Canada	Vancouver Whitecaps FC Academy	N/A
Joel Torbic; MF	USA	State College, Pennsylvania	Barca Residency Academy	3/5 stars

== Squad ==
=== Roster ===
As of January 16, 2024

Note: Flags indicate national team as defined under FIFA eligibility rules; some limited exceptions apply. Players may hold more than one non-FIFA nationality.

No.	Pos.	Nation	Player
0	GK	USA	Jonah Mednard
1	GK	USA	Trace Alphin
2	DF	USA	Bo Cummins
3	DF	USA	Travis Smith Jr.
4	DF	CAN	Amoni Thomas
5	DF	USA	Daniel Krueger
6	MF	USA	Liam O'Gara
7	MF	USA	Nico Rabiu
8	MF	USA	Dylan Borso
9	FW	CAN	Pariss Mitchell
10	MF	SEN	Babacar Niang
11	DF	PUR	Sidney Paris
12	MF	USA	Jose Perez
13	MF	USA	Jeffrey White
14	FW	USA	Ryan Belal

No.	Pos.	Nation	Player
15	DF	USA	Jojo Davila
16	MF	JPN	Joel Torbic
17	MF	USA	Pierce Bateson
18	MF	USA	Cooper Flax
19	DF	USA	Cristian Escribano
20	MF	USA	Ryan Fessler
21	FW	USA	Julian Kennedy
22	MF	GHA	Basit Umar
23	DF	USA	Vlad Walent
24	DF	USA	Mason Sullivan
25	DF	USA	Will Jackson
26	MF	USA	Colin Thomas
27	DF	USA	Prince Amponsah
28	MF	CHI	Nicolas Mancilla
30	GK	USA	Owen Barnett

=== Team management ===
Position	Staff
Athletic Director	John Currie
Head coach	Bobby Muuss
Associate head coach	Steve Armas
Associate head coach	Dane Brenner
Assistant coach	Ade Taiwo
Assistant Athletic Trainer	Michael White
Academic Counselor	Brooke Taylor
Sports Performance	David Bass

== Schedule ==
Date Time, TV	Rank^{#}	Opponent^{#}	Result	Record	Site (Attendance) City, State
Exhibition
August 11*; 7:00 p.m.	No. 15	at Davidson	T 1–1	–	Alumni Soccer Stadium; Davidson, NC
August 17*; 7:00 p.m.	No. 15	UNC Greensboro	L 0–2	–	Spry Stadium; Winston–Salem, NC
Regular season
August 22*; 8:00 p.m., ACCNX	No. 15	VCU	L 1–2	0–1–0	Spry Stadium (2,234); Winston–Salem, NC
August 25*; 7:00 p.m., ACCNX	No. 15	Central Arkansas	W 3–2	1–1–0	Spry Stadium (2,010); Winston–Salem, NC
August 31*; 7:00 p.m., ESPN+		at No. 21 UCF	T 1–1	1–1–1	UCF Soccer and Track Stadium (1,012); Orlando, FL
September 6*; 7:00 p.m., ESPN+		at Gardner–Webb	L 1–3	1–2–1	Greene–Harbison Stadium (350); Boiling Springs, NC
September 9*; 7:00 p.m., ACCNX		Radford	W 1–0	2–2–1	Spry Stadium (1,090); Winston–Salem, NC
September 13; 7:00 p.m., ACCNX		Virginia	T 1–1	2–2–2 (0–0–1)	Spry Stadium (2,440); Winston–Salem, NC
September 17*; 6:00 p.m., ACCN		No. 14 Elon	T 1–1	2–2–3	Spry Stadium (871); Winston–Salem, NC
September 20; 7:30 p.m., ACCN		at No. 4 Clemson	L 0–1	2–3–3 (0–1–1)	Riggs Field (6,222); Clemson, SC
September 27; 7:00 p.m., ACCNX		at Syracuse	W 2–1	3–3–3 (1–1–1)	SU Soccer Stadium (1,687); Syracuse, NY
October 1*; 7:00 p.m., ACCNX		East Tennessee State	W 2–0	4–3–3	Spry Stadium (852); Winston–Salem, NC
October 5; 7:00 p.m., ACCNX		Boston College	W 2–0	5–3–3 (2–1–1)	Spry Stadium (1,713); Winston–Salem, NC
October 8; 7:00 p.m., ACCNX		Wofford	T 0–0	5–3–4	Spry Stadium (1,117); Winston–Salem, NC
October 12; 7:00 p.m., ACCNX		at No. 16 Duke	T 0–0	5–3–5 (2–1–2)	Koskinen Stadium (1,129); Durham, NC
October 15*; 6:00 p.m., FloFC		at UNC Wilmington	W 4–1	6–3–5	UNCW Soccer Stadium (1,067); Wilmington, NC
October 19; 7:00 p.m., ACCNX		Virginia Tech	W 2–1	7–3–5 (3–1–2)	Spry Stadium (1,486); Winston–Salem, NC
October 25; 6:00 p.m., ACCN		at No. 21 SMU	L 0–3	7–4–5 (3–2–2)	Washburne Stadium (1,283); Dallas, TX
November 1; 7:00 p.m., ACCNX		No. 12 NC State	W 1–0	8–4–5 (4–2–2)	Spry Stadium (1,825); Winston–Salem, NC
ACC tournament
November 6; 7:00 p.m., ACCNX	(5)	(12) Syracuse; First Round	W 2–1	9–4–5	Spry Stadium (975); Winston–Salem, NC
November 10; 4:00 p.m., ACCN	(5)	at (4) No. 15 SMU; Quarterfinals	T 2–2 (5–4 PKs) ^{2OT}	9–4–6	Washburne Stadium (1,175); Dallas, TX
November 14; 5:30 p.m., ACCN	(5)	(9) Virginia; Semifinals	W 5–1	10–4–6	WakeMed Soccer Park (645); Cary, NC
November; 12:00 p.m., ESPNU	(5)	(2) No. 7 Clemson; Final	T 1–1 (7–6 PKs) ^{2OT}	10–4–7	WakeMed Soccer Park (1,839); Cary, NC
NCAA tournament
November 24; 6:00 p.m., ESPN+	(8)	Maryland; Second Round	W 2–1	11–4–7	Spry Stadium (2,034); Winston–Salem, NC
December 1; 6:00 p.m., ESPN+	(8)	(9) No. 7 Clemson; Third Round	W 2–1 ^{OT}	12–4–7	Spry Stadium (2,273); Winston–Salem, NC
December 7; 6:00 p.m., ESPN+	(8)	(1) No. 1 Ohio State; Quarterfinals	L 0–3	12–5–7	Jesse Owens Memorial Stadium (1,763); Columbus, OH
*Non-conference game. ^{#}Rankings from United Soccer Coaches. (#) Tournament seedings in parentheses. All times are in Eastern.

== Awards and honors ==
Recipient	Award	Date	Ref.
Babacar Niang	Pre-Season All-ACC Team	August 14	
Daniel Krueger	ACC Defensive Player of the Week – Week 9	October 22	
Trace Alphin	All-ACC Second Team	November 13	
Cooper Flax	All-ACC Second Team	November 13	
Dylan Borso	All-Freshman Team	November 13	
Prince Amponsah	ACC Tournament MVP	November 17, 2024	
Trace Alphin	All ACC-Tournament Team	November 17, 2024	
Prince Amponsah	All ACC-Tournament Team	November 17, 2024	
Bo Cummins	All ACC-Tournament Team	November 17, 2024	
Cooper Flax	All ACC-Tournament Team	November 17, 2024	

== 2025 MLS Super Draft ==
Player	Team	Round	Pick #	Position
(United States) Travis Smith Jr.	Chicago Fire FC	2	33	DF
(United States) Bo Cummins	Houston Dynamo FC	2	48	DF
(United States) Trace Alphin	Real Salt Lake	2	59	GK
(United States) Liam O'Gara	Real Salt Lake	3	79	MF

== Rankings ==
Ranking movements Legend: ██ Increase in ranking ██ Decrease in ranking — = Not ranked
	Week																
Poll	Pre	1	2	3	4	5	6	7	8	9	10	11	12	13	14	15	Final
United Soccer	15	—	—	—	—	—	—	—	—	—	—	—	Not released				6
TopDrawer Soccer	19	—	—	—	—	—	—	—	—	—	—	22	16	5	4	2	5
