= Ben Brewster =

American soccer player and coach

Personal information
- Full name: Benjamin O. Brewster
- Date of birth: September 26, 1947 (age 79)
- Place of birth: Newton, Massachusetts, United States
- Height: 5 ft 10 in (1.78 m)
- Position: Forward

College career
Years	Team	Apps	(Gls)
- Brown Bears

Senior career*
Years	Team	Apps	(Gls)
1973	Connecticut Wildcats	14	(10)
1974–1975	Boston Minutemen	20	(0)
1976	Tacoma Tides		
1977	Rhode Island Oceaneers	3	(0)
1978	New England Tea Men	11	(0)

International career
1973	United States	1	(1)

Managerial career
- 1972: Boston College Eagles
- Yale Bulldogs (assistant)
- UConn Huskies (assistant)
- 1977–1987: Boston College Eagles
- * Club domestic league appearances and goals

Benjamin Brewster is an American retired soccer forward who earned one caps, scoring a single goal, as a member of the U.S. national team in 1973. He played three seasons in the North American Soccer League and at least two in the American Soccer League.

== Player ==
=== Youth and college ===
Brewster did not begin playing soccer until he was eighteen years old. He attended Brown University and played for the school's soccer team where he was a 1968 second team All-American. In his four seasons at Brown, Brewster scored thirty-three goals and amassed fifty points. He has since been inducted into the Brown University Athletic Hall of Fame.

=== National team ===
On September 9, 1973, Brewster earned his only caps with the U.S. national team. Brewster replaced Charlie McCully at halftime and scored the U.S. goal in its 1–0 victory over Bermuda.

=== Professional ===
After college, Brewster signed with the Connecticut Wildcats of the American Soccer League (ASL). In 1974, he joined the Boston Minutemen of the North American Soccer League (NASL). He left the team after the 1975 season to play for the Tacoma Tides in the ASL. The Tides folded at the end of the 1976 season and Brewster played for the Rhode Island Oceaneers in 1977. In 1978, he signed with the New England Tea Men.

== Coach ==
In 1972, Brewster was hired to replace Gyorgy Lang as head coach of Boston College. He took the team to a 3–9–2 record, but left that position when he signed with the Wildcats in 1973. In 1977, Boston College hired Brewster again and he remained as head coach for the Eagles until 1987 when he was replaced by Ed Kelly. His best season came in 1980 when he took his team to a 15–3–3 record. He finished with a 108–81–29 record. He also served as an assistant to Hubert Vogelslinger at Yale University and Joe Morrone at the University of Connecticut. Brewster has also coached in the high school and youth soccer ranks. He currently has his own soccer school in Wolfboro, NH and does travel teams known as "Wildcat Soccer School".
