= Ed Kelly (soccer) =

Irish-American soccer player

Personal information
- Full name: Edmond Kelly
- Date of birth: October 24, 1948 (age 78)
- Place of birth: Dublin, Republic of Ireland
- Position: Midfielder

Senior career*
Years	Team	Apps	(Gls)
1975	Hartford Bicentennials	17	(1)
1976	Utah Golden Spikers		
- Rhode Island Oceaneers
1979	New Jersey Americans		

International career
1975	United States	2	(0)

Managerial career
- Rhode Island Oceaneers (assistant)
- 1979: New Jersey Americans (assistant)
- 1980–1984: Fairleigh Dickinson Knights (assistant)
- 1985–1987: Seton Hall Pirates
- 1988: New Jersey Eagles
- 1988–2019: Boston College Eagles
- * Club domestic league appearances and goals

Edmond Kelly (born October 24, 1948), nicknamed "the Silver Fox", is an Irish-American former soccer player and retired college soccer coach. He played in the American Soccer League and one season in the North American Soccer League and earned two caps with the U.S. national team. He was the head coach of the Boston College men's varsity soccer team from 1988 to 2019.

== Personal ==
Kelly was born in Dublin and grew up in Ireland. In 1969, he joined the United States Air Force, serving until 1973. He is married to high school sweetheart, Ann and they have three children.

== Player ==
=== Professional ===
Kelly played professionally for eight years. In 1975, he played a single season with the Hartford Bicentennials in the North American Soccer League. In 1976, he played for the Utah Golden Spikers of the American Soccer League. In 1979, he signed with the New Jersey Americans.

=== National team ===
Kelly earned two caps with the United States men's national soccer team in August 1975 at the Mexico City Cup. His first game was a 6–0 loss to Argentina on August 21. His second was a 2–0 loss to Mexico on August 24.

== Coaching ==
Kelly served as an assistant coach with both the Rhode Island Oceaneers and New Jersey Americans while he played for them. After retiring from playing professionally, Kelly became an assistant coach at Fairleigh Dickinson University. In 1985, Seton Hall hired Kelly as its men's soccer coach. In his three years at Seton Hall, his team compiled a 40–13–3 record and Coach Kelly was named the 1986 NJSCA Division I Coach of the Year. In 1987, Kelly left Seton Hall to become head coach of the New Jersey Eagles of the newly established American Soccer League. Kelly led the Eagles to a 15–5 record, top in the league. However, the team fell to the Washington Diplomats in the first round of the playoffs. In 1988, following the loss, Kelly left the Eagles to succeed Ben Brewster as head coach at Boston College. During his 31-year tenure at the Heights, Kelly amassed a record of 281–235–64. His 281 wins at Boston College rank him first on BC's all-time list. He compiled a career record of 321-248-70.

Kelly holds a USSF National "A" Coaching License. He also coached youth soccer as the Boys Coordinator of New England Futbol Club.
