= Boston College Eagles men's soccer =

American college soccer team

- 2026 Boston College Eagles men's soccer team
- Founded: 1967; 59 years ago
- University: Boston College
- Head coach: Francesco D'Agostino (1st season)
- Conference: ACC
- Location: Chestnut Hill, Massachusetts, US
- Stadium: Newton Campus Soccer Field (capacity: 2,000)
- Nickname: Eagles
- Colors: Maroon and gold
Home	Away

NCAA tournament Quarterfinals
- 2002, 2015

NCAA tournament Round of 16
- 2002, 2004, 2009, 2015

NCAA tournament appearances
- 1982, 1990, 2000, 2001, 2002, 2004, 2007, 2008, 2009, 2010, 2011, 2012, 2015, 2016, 2019

Conference tournament championships
- 1990, 2000, 2002, 2007

Conference regular season championships
- 1995, 2002, 2007

The Boston College Eagles men's soccer team represents Boston College in men's soccer. The team is a member of the Atlantic Coast Conference of the National Collegiate Athletic Association, having previously competed in the Big East Conference. The Eagles were led by coach Ed Kelly from 1988 until his retirement in 2019.

== Roster ==
As of 20 Feb 2025

Note: Flags indicate national team as defined under FIFA eligibility rules; some limited exceptions apply. Players may hold more than one non-FIFA nationality.

No.	Pos.	Nation	Player
2	DF	USA	Patrick Reddy
3	DF	USA	Christian Bejar
4	DF	USA	Diego Ochoa
6	MF	USA	Bryan Toro
7	MF	NOR	Sander Martinsen-Wold
8	MF	USA	Aidan Farwell
9	MF	NOR	Ask Ekeland
12	MF	USA	Jonathan Murphy
14	FW	GHA	Michael Asare
16	MF	USA	Marci Killeen
18	DF	USA	Max Andrews
19	MF	USA	Connor Gibson
21	MF	USA	Marco Dos Santos

No.	Pos.	Nation	Player
22	MF	USA	Erick Almendares
23	MF	USA	Jack Burkhardt
24	MF	USA	Devon Galluzzo
25	DF	USA	CJ Williams
27	DF	GER	Moritz Gundelach
29	MF	USA	Dylan Mafong
30	MF	USA	Simba Odhiambo
31	GK	USA	Sebastian Pliszka
32	GK	CHI	Thomas Jordan
33	GK	USA	Bryce Copeland-Del Toro
34	GK	USA	Leo Seidel
—		USA	Dilen Patel

== Notable alumni ==
=== Current Professional Players ===
As of February 20, 2025

- (United States) Jeff Cook (1986–1989) – Currently head coach of Penn State
- (United States) Mike Babst (1999–2002) – Currently head coach of Davidson
- (United States) Bob Thompson (1999–2002) – Currently head coach of Boston College
- (United States) Brendan Burke (2001–2005) – Currently head coach of Hartford Athletic
- (Ghana) Reuben Ayarna (2005–2007) – Currently assistant coach with Southern Connecticut
- (United States) Alejandro Bedoya (2007–2008) – Currently with Philadelphia Union
- (United States) Šaćir Hot (2009–2010) – Currently head coach of FC Motown
- (United States) Charlie Rugg (2009–2012) – Currently director of player development with Boston College
- (Canada) Kyle Bekker (2009–2012) – Currently with Forge FC
- Zeiko Lewis (2013–2016) – Currently with Union Omaha and Bermuda international
- (Morocco) Younes Boudadi (2016–2017) – Currently with Las Vegas Lights
- (United States) Callum Johnson (2016–2019) – Currently with One Knoxville SC
- (United States) Christian Garner (2018–2021) – Currently with Charleston Battery
- (Iceland) Stefán Ingi Sigurðarson (2019–2022) – Currently with Sandefjord
- (United States) Amos Shapiro-Thompson (2019–2022) – Currently with Rhode Island FC

== Head coaches ==
- Gyorgy Lang (1967–1971)
- Ben Brewster (1972, 1977–1987)
- Hans Westerkamp (1973–1976)
- Ed Kelly (1988–2019)
- Bob Thompson (2019–2026)
- Francesco D'Agostino (2026)

=== Yearly records ===
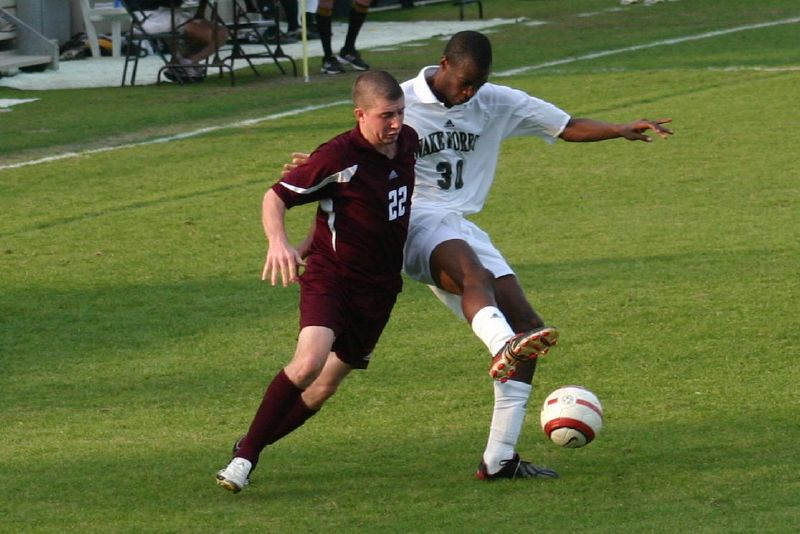
Boston College v Wake Forest match in 2005

Record table
Season	Coach	Overall	Conference	Standing	Postseason
Gyorgy Lang (Independent) (1967–1971)
1967	Gyorgy Lang	7–5–1			
1968	Gyorgy Lang	3–9–0			
1969	Gyorgy Lang	5–4–3			
1970	Gyorgy Lang	4–9–0			
1971	Gyorgy Lang	6–8–0			
Gyorgy Lang:		25–34–4			
Ben Brewster (Independent) (1972–1972)
1972	Ben Brewster	3–9–2			
Ben Brewster:		3–9–2			
Hans Westerkamp (Independent) (1973–1976)
1973	Hans Westerkamp	7–6–3			
1974	Hans Westerkamp	5–9–2			
1975	Hans Westerkamp	4–11–1			
1976	Hans Westerkamp	6–8–1			
Hans Westerkamp:		22–34–7			
Ben Brewster (Independent) (1977–1984)
1977	Ben Brewster	6–9–1			
1978	Ben Brewster	13–5–0			
1979	Ben Brewster	9–6–5			
1980	Ben Brewster	15–3–3			
1981	Ben Brewster	14–6–1			
1982	Ben Brewster	15–5–3			NCAA first round
1983	Ben Brewster	9–10–2			
1984	Ben Brewster	7–8–3			
Ben Brewster (Big East Conference) (1985–1987)
1985	Ben Brewster	8–9–3	1–2–0	3rd North	
1986	Ben Brewster	8–8–5	2–1–0	3rd North	
1987	Ben Brewster	4–12–3	1–1–1	2nd North	
Ben Brewster:		108–81–29	4–4–1		
Ed Kelly (Big East Conference) (1988–2004)
1988	Ed Kelly	7–11–1	1–2–0	4th North	
1989	Ed Kelly	8–10–1	2–1–0	2nd North	
1990	Ed Kelly	14–5–2	5–2–1	2nd	NCAA first round
1991	Ed Kelly	8–7–3	2–4–2	7th	
1992	Ed Kelly	10–8–0	3–5–0	6th	
1993	Ed Kelly	12–5–1	5–3–0	3rd	
1994	Ed Kelly	7–7–3	5–2–1	3rd	
1995	Ed Kelly	11–5–2	8–1–1	1st	
1996	Ed Kelly	3–10–4	3–4–4	8th	
1997	Ed Kelly	5–9–2	4–6–1	8th	
1998	Ed Kelly	5–10–2	2–8–1	10th	
1999	Ed Kelly	6–9–2	2–9–0	10th	
2000	Ed Kelly	12–7–1	7–3–1	3rd	NCAA first round
2001	Ed Kelly	10–8–0	6–4–0	6th	NCAA first round
2002	Ed Kelly	18–5–0	8–2–0	1st	NCAA Quarterfinals
2003	Ed Kelly	6–7–4	3–5–2	9th	
2004	Ed Kelly	13–5–2	6–3–1	3rd	NCAA regional semifinal
Ed Kelly (Atlantic Coast Conference) (2005–2019)
2005	Ed Kelly	5–9–2	0–6–2	9th	
2006	Ed Kelly	8–7–2	3–3–2	6th	
2007	Ed Kelly	15–5–1	7–1–0	1st	NCAA second round
2008	Ed Kelly	11–7–3	5–3–0	3rd	NCAA second round
2009	Ed Kelly	14–9–0	5–3–0	4th	NCAA regional semifinal
2010	Ed Kelly	10–5–5	2–2–4	5th	NCAA first round
2011	Ed Kelly	14–6–1	4–4–0	6th	NCAA second round
2012	Ed Kelly	8–6–5	3–2–3	t–4th	NCAA first round
2013	Ed Kelly	7–9–3	4–6–1	8th	
2014	Ed Kelly	5–8–3	1–6–1	6th Atlantic	
2015	Ed Kelly	11–8–2	4–4–0	3rd Atlantic	NCAA Quarterfinals
2016	Ed Kelly	9–9–3	3–3–3	5th Atlantic	NCAA second round
2017	Ed Kelly	6–10–1	1–6–1	5th Atlantic	
2018	Ed Kelly	4–8–4	2–5–1	4th Atlantic	
2019	Ed Kelly	9–6–3	2–4–2	5th Atlantic	NCAA second round
Ed Kelly:		290–241–68	111–116–32		
Bob Thompson (Atlantic Coast Conference) (2020–present)
2020	Bob Thompson	1–3–1	1–3–1	5th Atlantic	
2021	Bob Thompson	6–7–2	2–4–2	4th Atlantic	
2022	Bob Thompson	4–7–5	1–4–3	5th Atlantic	
2023	Bob Thompson	3–9–5	0–5–3	6th Atlantic	
2024	Bob Thompson	5–5–6	1–4–3	13th	
Bob Thompson:		19–31–19	5–20–12		
Total:		448–417–120			
National champion Postseason invitational champion Conference regular season champion Conference regular season and conference tournament champion Division regular season champion Division regular season and conference tournament champion Conference tournament champion

== Championships ==
ACC Tournament:

- Champions (1): 2007

ACC Regular Season:

- Champions (1): 2007

Big East Tournament:

- Champions (3): 1990, 2000, 2002
- Runners-up (2): 1982, 1993

Big East Regular Season:

- Champions (2): 1995, 2002
- Runners-up (1): 1990

== Awards and honors ==
NSCAA All-America

- 2008: Alejandro Bedoya, Second Team
- 2007: Reuben Ayarna, First Team; Alejandro Bedoya, First Team; Sherron Manswell, Second Team
- 2006: Charlie Davies, FW – First Team
- 2004: Guy Melamed, Second Team
- 2002: Guy Melamed, Third Team
- 2000: Chris Hamblin, First Team
- 1995: Paul Keegan, Second Team
- 1993: Paul Keegan, Second Team

College Soccer News All-America

- 2008: Alejandro Bedoya, First Team
- 2007: Alejandro Bedoya, First Team
- 2006: Charlie Davies, First Team
- 2004: Guy Melamed, First Team
- 2002: Guy Melamed, Second Team

Soccer America All-America

- 2007: Alejandro Bedoya, First Team; Reuben Ayarna, Second Team

Soccer America National Coach of the Year

- Ed Kelly: 2002

NSCAA/Adidas Regional Coach of the Year

- Ed Kelly: 2000, 2002 (New England), 2007, 2011 (South Atlantic)

ACC Coach of the Year

- Ed Kelly: 2007

ACC Offensive Player of the Year

- Alejandro Bedoya: 2007
- Charlie Davies: 2006

ACC Tournament MVP

- Sherron Manswell: 2007

ACC All-Tournament Team

- Diego Medina-Mendez: 2011
- Colin Murphy: 2011
- Charlie Rugg: 2011
- Amit Aburmad: 2010
- Edvin Worley: 2009
- Chris Brown: 2007, 2008
- Alejandro Bedoya: 2007
- Paul Gerstenberger, 2007
- Sherron Manswell, 2007

All-ACC First Team

- Kyle Bekker: 2011, 2012
- Charlie Rugg: 2010–2012
- Chris Brown: 2008
- Alejandro Bedoya: 2007, 2008
- Reuben Ayarna: 2007
- Charlie Davies: 2006

All-ACC Second Team

- Ask Ekeland: 2024
- Stefan Sigurdarson: 2022
- Chris Ager: 2011
- Kyle Bekker: 2010
- Justin Luthy: 2009
- Karl Reddick: 2009
- Chris Brown: 2007
- Sherron Manswell: 2005, 2007
- Reuben Ayarna: 2006

All-ACC Freshman Team

- Xavier O'Neil: 2023
- Aidan Farwell: 2021
- Amos Shapiro-Thompson: 2019
- Stefan Sigurdarson: 2019
- Victor Souza: 2019
- Aidan Farwell: 2021

Big East Coach of the Year

- Ed Kelly: 1989, 1990, 2000, 2002

Big East Offensive Player of the Year

- Guy Melamed: 2004
- Casey Schmidt: 2000
- Paul Keegan: 1994

Big East Goalkeeper of the Year

- Kyle Singer: 2002
- Chris Hamblin: 2000

Big East Tournament Most Outstanding Player

- Bobby Thompson: 2000, 2002
- Justin Ceccarelli: 1990
