= 2020 Georgetown Hoyas men's soccer team =

American college soccer season

2020 Georgetown Hoyas men's soccer

Big East regular season champions
- Conference: Big East Conference
- Record: 10–2–2 (7–0–2 Big East)
- Head coach: Brian Wiese (15th season)
- Assistant coaches: Mike Casper (2nd season); Connor Klekota (3rd season); Brian Bouhl (3rd season)
- Home stadium: Shaw Field

2020 Big East Conference men's soccer standings
| | Conf. | | | | | Overall |
| Team | W | | L | | T | W | | L | | T |
|---|---|---|---|---|---|---|---|---|---|---|
East
| No. 5 Georgetown + | 7 | – | 0 | – | 2 | 9 | – | 2 | – | 2 |
| No. 9 Seton Hall ‡ | 5 | – | 1 | – | 2 | 10 | – | 2 | – | 3 |
| Providence | 3 | – | 3 | – | 1 | 4 | – | 4 | – | 1 |
| St. John's | 3 | – | 5 | – | 0 | 5 | – | 5 | – | 0 |
| Villanova | 2 | – | 5 | – | 0 | 2 | – | 8 | – | 0 |
| UConn | 0 | – | 6 | – | 1 | 1 | – | 6 | – | 1 |
Midwest
| No. 14 Marquette + | 5 | – | 1 | – | 1 | 8 | – | 2 | – | 2 |
| Creighton | 5 | – | 3 | – | 0 | 6 | – | 6 | – | 0 |
| Butler | 4 | – | 2 | – | 2 | 4 | – | 6 | – | 2 |
| DePaul | 2 | – | 5 | – | 0 | 2 | – | 5 | – | 2 |
| Xavier | 0 | – | 5 | – | 1 | 3 | – | 7 | – | 1 |
‡ – 2020 Big East Tournament champion + – Also invited to the 2020 NCAA tournament; As of May 28, 2021; Rankings from United Soccer Coaches

The 2020 Georgetown Hoyas men's soccer team represented the Georgetown University during the 2020 NCAA Division I men's soccer season and the 2020 Big East Conference men's soccer season. The regular season began on February 16, 2021 and is set to conclude on April 10. It was the program's 69th season fielding a men's varsity soccer team, and their 25th season in the Big East Conference. The 2020 season was Brian Wiese's 14th year as head coach for the program.

== Effects of the Covid-19 pandemic ==
As a result of the COVID-19 pandemic, the Big East postponed the fall sports, with the hope of playing in the spring.

On November 4, 2020, the NCAA approved a plan for college soccer to be played in the spring. The Big East announced their plans for the spring season in January 2021.

== Squad ==
=== Roster ===
As of April 7, 2021

Note: Flags indicate national team as defined under FIFA eligibility rules; some limited exceptions apply. Players may hold more than one non-FIFA nationality.

| No. | Pos. | Nation | Player |
|---|---|---|---|
| 0 | GK | GRE | Giannis Nikopolidis |
| 1 | GK | USA | Ryan Schewe |
| 2 | DF | USA | Rio Hope-Gund |
| 3 | MF | USA | Paul Rothrock |
| 4 | DF | USA | Kenny Nielsen |
| 5 | DF | USA | Daniel Wu |
| 6 | MF | USA | Sean Zawadzki |
| 7 | MF | USA | Jacob Montes |
| 8 | MF | USA | Dante Polvara |
| 9 | FW | USA | Derek Dodson |
| 10 | FW | USA | Will Sands |
| 12 | MF | USA | Kyle Linhares |
| 13 | MF | USA | Chris Hegardt |

| No. | Pos. | Nation | Player |
|---|---|---|---|
| 14 | MF | USA | Trevor Burns |
| 16 | FW | USA | Marlon Tabora Ponce |
| 17 | MF | USA | John Franks |
| 18 | MF | USA | Aidan Rocha |
| 19 | FW | USA | Pranav Jha |
| 20 | DF | USA | Dominic De Almeida |
| 21 | FW | USA | Pierrick Gould |
| 22 | FW | USA | Martin Ngoh |
| 23 | MF | USA | Chris Le |
| 24 | GK | USA | Ethan Koehler |
| 27 | MF | USA | Zach Riviere |
| 28 | DF | USA | Joe DaLuz |
| 30 | GK | USA | Jordan Wells |

== Schedule ==
=== Regular season ===
| February 16 Non-conference | George Washington | Postponed | Georgetown | Washington, D.C. |
| 1:00 p.m. EST | | Report | | Stadium: Mount Vernon Athletic Field |

| February 19 Non-conference | Georgetown | Postponed | James Madison | Washington, D.C. |
| 12:00 p.m. EST | | Report | | Stadium: Shaw Field |

| February 23 Non-conference | George Mason | Postponed | Georgetown | Fairfax, VA |
| 7:00 p.m. EST | | Report | | Stadium: George Mason Stadium |

| February 27 Conference | Villanova | 0-3 | Georgetown | Philadelphia, PA |
| 1:00 p.m. EST | | Report | Chris Hegardt 43'; Dante Polvara 61', 67' | Stadium: Higgins Soccer Complex |

| March 3 Conference | Georgetown | 2-1 (a.e.t.) | Seton Hall | Washington, D.C. |
| 3:00 p.m. EST | Dante Polvara 64', 98' | Report | CJ Tibbling 47' | Stadium: Shaw Field; Attendance: 0 |

| March 6 Conference | Providence | 0-0 (a.e.t.) | Georgetown | Providence, RI |
| 12:00 p.m. EST | | Report | | Stadium: Chapey Field at Anderson Stadium; Attendance: 200 |

| March 13 Conference | Georgetown | 1-0 | St. John's | Washington, D.C. |
| 12:00 p.m. EST | Chris Hegardt 30' | Report | | Stadium: Shaw Field; Attendance: 0 |

| March 17 Conference | Georgetown | 3-2 (a.e.t.) | Villanova | Washington, D.C. |
| 2:00 p.m. EST | Derek Dodson 57'; Villanova own goal 81' (o.g.); Paul Rothrock 98' | Report | Lyam MacKinnon 27', 49' | Stadium: Shaw Field; Attendance: 0 |

| March 20 Conference | Seton Hall | 1-1 (a.e.t.) | Georgetown | South Orange, NJ |
| 3:00 p.m. EST | Eden O'Leary 81' | Report | Derek Dodson 74' | Stadium: Owen T. Carroll Field; Attendance: 30 |

| March 24 Conference | UConn | Cancelled | Georgetown | Storrs, CT |
| 2:00 p.m. EST | | | | Stadium: Morrone Stadium |

| March 27 Conference | Providence | 0-3 | Georgetown | Washington, D.C. |
| 1:00 p.m. EST | | Report | Aidan Rocha 77'; Providence own goal 82' (o.g.); Kyle Linhares 90' | Stadium: Shaw Field; Attendance: 0 |

| April 3 Conference | Georgetown | 5-1 | UConn | Washington, D.C. |
| 1:00 p.m. EST | Dante Polvara 1', 50'; Paul Rothrock 13'; Jacob Montes 57', 64' | | Moussa Wade 68' | Stadium: Shaw Field; Attendance: 0 |

| April 10 Conference | St. John's | 0-1 | Georgetown | Queens, NY |
| 3:30 p.m. EST | | Report | Dante Polvara 39' | Stadium: Belson Stadium; Attendance: 0 |

=== Postseason ===
==== Big East Tournament ====
| April 15 Semifinals | Georgetown | 1-0 | Creighton | Washington, D.C. |
| 12:00 p.m. EST | Joe DaLuz 84' | Report | | Stadium: Shaw Field; Attendance: 0 |

| April 17 Final | Georgetown | 1-2 | Seton Hall | Washington, D.C. |
| 3:00 p.m. EST | Zach Riviere 34' | Report | Camil Koreichi 16'; CJ Tibbling 63' | Stadium: Shaw Field; Attendance: 0 |

==== NCAA Tournament ====
| May 2, 2021 Second Round | Georgetown | 2-0 | High Point | Matthews, North Carolina |
| 12:00 p.m. EDT | Zach Riviere 20'; Chris Hegardt 48' | Report | | Stadium: Matthews Sportsplex; Attendance: 253 |

| May 6, 2021 Third Round | Georgetown | 3-2 | Penn State | Cary, North Carolina |
| 12:00 p.m. EDT | Dante Polvara 8' (pen.); Zach Riviere 29'; Martin Ngoh 44' | Report | 12' (pen.) Peter Mangione; 58' Daniel Bloyou | Stadium: WakeMed Soccer Park; Attendance: 167 |

| May 10, 2021 Quarterfinals | Georgetown | 0-1 | Marshall | Cary, North Carolina |
| 1:00 p.m. EDT | | Report | Jamil Roberts 70' | Stadium: WakeMed Soccer Park; Attendance: 186 |
