= 2020 Seton Hall Pirates men's soccer team =

American college soccer season

2020 Seton Hall Pirates men's soccer

Big East tournament champions

NCAA Tournament
- Conference: Big East Conference
- U. Soc. Coaches poll: No. 11
- Record: 9–1–3 (5–1–2 Big East)
- Head coach: Andreas Lindberg (3rd season)
- Assistant coaches: Jeff Matteo (3rd season); Ali Simmons (2nd season); Dan Solli (2nd season)
- Home stadium: Lorenz Field

2020 Big East Conference men's soccer standings
	Conf.					Overall
Team	W		L		T	W		L		T
East
No. 5 Georgetown +	7	–	0	–	2	9	–	2	–	2
No. 9 Seton Hall ‡	5	–	1	–	2	10	–	2	–	3
Providence	3	–	3	–	1	4	–	4	–	1
St. John's	3	–	5	–	0	5	–	5	–	0
Villanova	2	–	5	–	0	2	–	8	–	0
UConn	0	–	6	–	1	1	–	6	–	1
Midwest
No. 14 Marquette +	5	–	1	–	1	8	–	2	–	2
Creighton	5	–	3	–	0	6	–	6	–	0
Butler	4	–	2	–	2	4	–	6	–	2
DePaul	2	–	5	–	0	2	–	5	–	2
Xavier	0	–	5	–	1	3	–	7	–	1
‡ – 2020 Big East Tournament champion + – Also invited to the 2020 NCAA tournament; As of May 28, 2021; Rankings from United Soccer Coaches

The 2020 Seton Hall Pirates men's soccer team represented Seton Hall University during the 2020 NCAA Division I men's soccer season and the 2020 Big East Conference men's soccer season. The 2020 season was Andreas Lindberg's third year as head coach for the program.

Seton Hall won the Big East Conference Men's Soccer Tournament for the first time since 1992, and qualified for the NCAA Division I Men's Soccer Tournament for the first time since 2005.

== Background ==
Seton Hall finished the 2019 season with a 6–9–1 (3–5–1) record. They did not qualify for the Big East or NCAA Tournaments.

== Effects of the COVID-19 pandemic on the season ==
On August 12, 2020, the Big East Conference suspended all fall sports including men's soccer, with plans to reconvene in the spring of 2021.

On November 4, 2020, the NCAA approved a plan for college soccer to be played in the spring.

== Schedule ==
=== Regular season ===
February 17, 2021 Nonconference	NJIT	3–3 (a.e.t.)	Seton Hall	Newark, NJ
3:00 p.m. EST		Report		Stadium: J. Malcolm Simon Stadium

February 20, 2021 Nonconference	Seton Hall	1–0	La Salle	South Orange, NJ
3:00 p.m. EST		Report		Stadium: Owen T. Carroll Field

February 24, 2021 Nonconference	Seton Hall	2–0	Fairleigh Dickinson	South Orange, NJ
6:30 p.m. EST		Report		Stadium: Owen T. Carroll Field

February 27, 2021 Big East 1	Seton Hall	1–0	St. John's	South Orange, NJ
3:00 p.m. EST		Report		Stadium: Owen T. Carroll Field

March 3, 2021 Big East 2	Georgetown	2–1 (a.e.t.)	Seton Hall	Washington, DC
2:00 p.m. EST		Report		Stadium: Shaw Field

March 6, 2021 Big East 3	UConn	0–0 (a.e.t.)	Seton Hall	Storrs, CT
2:00 p.m. EST		Report		Stadium: Morrone Stadium

March 10, 2021 Big East 4	Seton Hall	1–0	Villanova	South Orange, NJ
6:30 p.m. EDT		Report		Stadium: Owen T. Carroll Field

March 13, 2021 Big East 5	Seton Hall	1–0	Providence	South Orange, NJ
3:00 p.m. EDT		Report		Stadium: Owen T. Carroll Field

March 17, 2021 Big East 6	St. John's	2–3 (a.e.t.)	Seton Hall	Queens, NY
6:00 p.m. EDT		Report		Stadium: Belson Stadium

March 20, 2021 Big East 7	Seton Hall	1–1 (a.e.t.)	Georgetown	South Orange, NJ
3:00 p.m. EDT		Report		Stadium: Owen T. Carroll Field

March 27, 2021 Big East 8	Seton Hall	1–0	UConn	South Orange, NJ
1:00 p.m. EDT		Report		Stadium: Owen T. Carroll Field

April 3, 2021 Big East 9	Villanova	Cancelled	Seton Hall	Villanova, PA
3:00 p.m. EDT		Report		Stadium: Higgins Soccer Complex
Note: Cancelled due to COVID-19 protocols

April 10, 2021 Big East 10	Providence	Cancelled	Seton Hall	Providence, RI
12:00 p.m. EDT		Report		Stadium: Anderson Stadium
Note: Cancelled due to COVID-19 protocols

=== Postseason ===
==== Big East Tournament ====
April 15, 2021 Semifinals	^{(MW1)} Marquette	1–4	^{(E2)} Seton Hall	Washington, DC
3:30 p.m. EDT		Report		Stadium: Shaw Field

April 17, 2021 Final	^{(E1)} Georgetown	1–2	^{(E2)} Seton Hall	Washington, DC
3:30 p.m. EDT		Report		Stadium: Shaw Field

==== NCAA Tournament ====
May 2, 2021 Second round	Seton Hall	2–1	Air Force	Matthews, North Carolina
8:00 p.m. EDT	JP Martin 63'; CJ Tibbling 88'	Report	74' Tristan Trager	Stadium: Matthews Sportsplex; Attendance: 135

May 6, 2021 Third round	Seton Hall	2–2 (a.e.t.) (7–6 p)	Virginia Tech	Cary, North Carolina
9:00 p.m. EDT	Maurice Williams 44'; Andrea Borg 80'	Report	13', 55' Nick Blacklock	Stadium: WakeMed Soccer Park; Attendance: 132
	Penalties
	Johannes Pex (penalty scored); Camil Koreichi (penalty missed); CJ Tibbling (penalty scored); James Boote (penalty scored); JP Marin (penalty scored); Andrea Borg (penalty scored); Eden O'Leary (penalty scored); Andreas Nota (penalty scored)		(penalty scored) Sivert Haugli; (penalty scored) Nick Blacklock; (penalty missed) Landon Ameres; (penalty scored) Zane Bubb; (penalty scored) Camron Joice; (penalty scored) Camron Lennon; (penalty scored) Andrew Weber; (penalty missed) Chris Little

May 10, 2021 Quarterfinals	Indiana	2–0	Seton Hall	Cary, North Carolina
5:00 p.m. EDT	Ryan Wittenbrink 43'; Thomas Warr 57'	Report		Stadium: WakeMed Soccer Park; Attendance: 68
