= 2020 Big East Conference men's soccer season =

- League: NCAA Division I
- Sport: Soccer
- Teams: 11

Regular Season

Big East Conference men's soccer seasons
- ← 2019

2020 Big East Conference men's soccer standings
	Conf.					Overall
Team	W		L		T	W		L		T
East
No. 5 Georgetown +	7	–	0	–	2	9	–	2	–	2
No. 9 Seton Hall ‡	5	–	1	–	2	10	–	2	–	3
Providence	3	–	3	–	1	4	–	4	–	1
St. John's	3	–	5	–	0	5	–	5	–	0
Villanova	2	–	5	–	0	2	–	8	–	0
UConn	0	–	6	–	1	1	–	6	–	1
Midwest
No. 14 Marquette +	5	–	1	–	1	8	–	2	–	2
Creighton	5	–	3	–	0	6	–	6	–	0
Butler	4	–	2	–	2	4	–	6	–	2
DePaul	2	–	5	–	0	2	–	5	–	2
Xavier	0	–	5	–	1	3	–	7	–	1
‡ – 2020 Big East Tournament champion + – Also invited to the 2020 NCAA tournament; As of May 28, 2021; Rankings from United Soccer Coaches

The 2020 Big East Conference men's soccer season was the eighth season for the realigned Big East Conference. Including the history of the original Big East Conference, this was the 25th season of men's soccer under the "Big East Conference" name.

Due to the COVID-19 pandemic, the fall season was postponed to the spring.

Entering the season, Georgetown were the defending conference tournament champions, as well as the defending conference regular season champions.

== Changes from previous season ==
School	Previous Conference	New Conference
UConn	American Athletic Conference	Big East Conference

== Teams ==
Team	City	Stadium	Capacity
Butler Bulldogs	Indianapolis, Indiana	Bud and Jackie Sellick Bowl	7,500
Creighton Bluejays	Omaha, Nebraska	Morrison Stadium	6,000
DePaul Blue Demons	Chicago, Illinois	Wish Field	1,200
Georgetown Hoyas	Washington, D.C.	Shaw Field	1,625
Marquette Golden Eagles	Milwaukee, Wisconsin	Valley Fields	1,600
Providence Friars	Providence, Rhode Island	Anderson Stadium	3,000
Seton Hall Pirates	South Orange, New Jersey	Owen T. Carroll Field	1,800
St. John's Red Storm	New York City, New York	Belson Stadium	2,168
UConn Huskies	Storrs, Connecticut	Morrone Stadium	5,100
Villanova Wildcats	Philadelphia, Pennsylvania	Higgins Soccer Complex	1,000
Xavier Musketeers	Cincinnati, Ohio	Corcoran Field	1,600

== Spring 2021 season ==
The earliest that the season can start is February 3, 2021. The latest possible date is April 17.

=== Preseason poll ===
The preseason poll will be released in December 2020 or January 2021.

	Team ranking	Points	First place votes
1.			
2.			
3.			
4.			
5.			
6.			
7.			
8.			
9.			
10.			
11.			

=== Preseason national polls ===
The preseason national polls were originally to be released in July and August 2020. Only CollegeSoccerNews.com released a preseason poll for 2020.

	UnitedSoccer	CSN	SoccerAmerica	Top DrawerSoccer
Butler	—	—	—	—
Creighton	—	—	—	—
DePaul	—	—	—	—
Georgetown	—	—	—	—
Marquette	—	—	—	—
Providence	—	—	—	—
Seton Hall	—	—	—	—
St. John's	—	—	—	—
UConn	—	—	—	—
Villanova	—	—	—	—
Xavier	—	—	—	—

== MLS SuperDraft ==
The MLS SuperDraft was held on January 21, 2021 and was held virtually through its website. A total of five players from the Big East Conference were selected in the Draft. A record four Georgetown players were drafted.

=== Total picks by school ===
Team	Round 1	Round 2	Round 3	Comp.	Total
Butler	0	0	0	0	0
Creighton	0	0	1	0	1
DePaul	0	0	0	0	0
Georgetown	2	1	1	0	4
Marquette	0	0	0	0	0
Providence	0	0	0	0	0
Seton Hall	0	0	0	0	0
St. John's	0	0	0	0	0
UConn	0	0	0	0	0
Villanova	0	0	0	0	0
Xavier	0	0	0	0	0

=== List of selections ===
Round	Pick #	MLS team	Player	Position	College	Ref
1	8	Orlando City	Derek Dodson	FW	Georgetown	
1	19	Orlando City	Rio Hope-Gund	DF	Georgetown	
2	38	Minnesota United	Sean O'Hearn	DF	Georgetown	
3	64	Toronto FC	Paul Rothrock	MF	Georgetown	
3	70	Portland Timbers	Diego Gutierrez	FW	Creighton	
