= 2023 Big East Conference men's soccer tournament =

- Classification: Division I
- Teams: 8
- Matches: 7
- Attendance: 4,405
- First round site: Top Seed Campus Site
- Semifinals site: Maryland SoccerPlex; Boyds, Maryland
- Finals site: Maryland SoccerPlex; Boyds, Maryland
- Champions: Xavier (1st title)
- Winning coach: John Higgins (1st title)
- MVP: Taylor Rhinehart (Offensive); Johnny Mennell (Defensive) (Xavier)
- Broadcast: Big East Network (Quarterfinals and Semifinals), Fox Sports 1 (Final)

2023 Big East Conference men's soccer standings
	Conf.					Overall
Team	W		L		T	W		L		T
East
No. 16 Georgetown +	6	–	1	–	1	13	–	3	–	3
Providence	4	–	2	–	2	8	–	6	–	3
St. John's	3	–	1	–	4	8	–	4	–	5
UConn	4	–	4	–	0	9	–	8	–	1
Seton Hall	3	–	4	–	1	8	–	6	–	3
Villanova	1	–	4	–	3	1	–	8	–	7
Midwest
Xavier ‡	4	–	1	–	3	9	–	4	–	6
Creighton	3	–	3	–	2	4	–	7	–	6
Akron	2	–	1	–	5	9	–	2	–	7
Butler	1	–	3	–	4	2	–	7	–	6
DePaul	1	–	4	–	3	3	–	7	–	5
Marquette	1	–	5	–	2	7	–	6	–	3
‡ – 2023 Big East tournament champion + – At-large invitation to the 2023 NCAA tournament; As of December 12, 2023; Rankings from United Soccer Coaches; Source: Big East

The 2023 Big East Conference men's soccer tournament was the post-season men's soccer tournament for the Big East Conference held from November 4 to 12, 2023. The eight-match tournament took place at Maryland SoccerPlex in Boyds, Maryland for the semifinals and finals, while the first round was hosted by the higher seeded team. The eight-team single-elimination tournament consisted of three rounds based on seeding from regular season conference play. The defending champions were the Creighton Bluejays. They were unable to defend their title, losing as the sixth seed in the first round to Providence. Xavier finished as tournament champions after defeating Georgetown in a penalty shoot-out in the Final. This was the first Big East title in program history for Xavier, and the first for head coach John Higgins. As tournament champions, Xavier earned the Big East's automatic place in the 2023 NCAA Division I men's soccer tournament.

== Seeding ==
The top eight teams in the regular season earned a spot in the 2023 tournament. Teams were seeded based on regular season conference record and tiebreakers were used to determine seedings of teams that finished with the same record. A tiebreaker was required to determine the sixth and seventh seeds of the tournament as Creighton and Akron both finished with eleven conference regular season points. Creighton earned the sixth seed by virtue of a 3–2 regular season win over Akron on October 18.

Seed	School	Conference record	Points
1	Georgetown	6–1–1	19
2	Xavier	4–1–3	15
3	Providence	4–2–2	14
4	St. John's	3–1–4	13
5	UConn	4–4–0	12
6	Creighton	3–3–2	11
7	Akron	2–1–5	11
8	Seton Hall	3–4–1	10

== Bracket ==
First round Saturday, Nov. 4
1	Georgetown	2
8	Seton Hall	1
4	St. John's	1
5	UConn (a.e.t.)	2
3	Providence	3
6	Creighton	0
2	Xavier	1
7	Akron	0

Semifinals; Thursday, Nov. 9
1	Georgetown	2
5	UConn	0
3	Providence	0
2	Xavier	1

Final; Sunday, Nov. 12
1	Georgetown	0 (4)
2	Xavier (pen.)	0 (5)

== Schedule ==
=== First Round ===
November 4	#1 Georgetown	2–1	#8 Seton Hall	Washington, D.C.
12:00 p.m. ET	Kyle Linhares 12'; Zach Zengue (yellow card) 50'; Max Viera (yellow card) 72'; Matthew Van Horn 86'	Report	51' Hugo Gerbore; (yellow card) 60' Thomas Nunez; (red card) 64' Konstantin Donalies	Stadium: Shaw Field; Attendance: 0 Referee: Chico Grajeda; Assistant referees: Max Elsasser; Max Smith; Fourth official: Ryan Meyers

November 4	#3 Providence	3–0	#6 Creighton	Providence, RI
4:00 p.m. ET	Brendan McSorley 1', 76'; Lukas Burns (yellow card) 65'; Bruno Rosa 70'; Rodrigo Vaza (yellow card) 80'	Report	(yellow card) 26' Giorgio Probo; (yellow card) 84' Luke Mitchell	Stadium: Chapey Field; Attendance: 1,105; Referee: Carlos Fernandez; Assistant referees: Risto Georgiev; Will Ferris; Fourth official: John Jordan

November 4	#4 St. John's	1–2 (a.e.t.)	#5 UConn	New York, NY
6:00 p.m. ET	Lenny Cidolit 47'; Thomas Lamaille (yellow card) 61'; Antek Sienkiel (yellow card) 94'; Nicolas Fleuriau Chateau (yellow card) 110'	Report	21' Scott Testori; (yellow card) 67' Nicholas Tomerius; 102' Eli Conway; (yellow card) 102' Team	Stadium: Belson Stadium; Attendance: 717; Referee: Gregory DeMello; Assistant referees: Alex Rusu; Hector Rueda; Fourth official: William Pottorff

November 4	#2 Xavier	1–0	#7 Akron	Norwood, OH
7:00 p.m. ET	Grayson Elmquist 57'; Cooper Forcellini (yellow card) 59'; George Waites (yellow card) 62'; Taylor Rhinehart (yellow card) 76'	Report	(yellow card) 29' (yellow-red card) 64' Ashton Kamdem; (yellow card) 33' Jason Shokalook; (yellow card) 51' Josef Paulus; (yellow card) 74' Alejandro Varela; (red card) 90' Carter Cormier	Stadium: Corcoran Field; Attendance: 396; Referee: Sergio Gonzales; Assistant referees: Brian Apwisch; Cory Richardson; Fourth official: Britton Maier

=== Semifinals ===
November 9	#2 Xavier	1–0	#3 Providence	Boyds, MD
4:00 p.m. ET	Taylor Rhinehart 48', (yellow card) 65'; Jonny Mennell (yellow card) 73'	Report	(yellow card) 51' Miguel Candela; (yellow card) 53' Brendan McSorley; (yellow card) 58' Rodrigo Vaza	Stadium: Maryland SoccerPlex; Attendance: 457; Referee: Stephen Foster; Assistant referees: Israel Campos; Randal Von Steuben; Fourth official: Max Smith

November 9	#1 Georgetown	2–0	#5 UConn	Boyds, MD
6:30 p.m. ET	Kenny Nielsen (yellow card) 31'; Marlon Tabora 70'; Max Viera 88'	Report	(yellow card) 76' (yellow-red card) Moussa Wade; (yellow card) 90' Nicolas Tomerius; (yellow card) 90' Guillaume Vacter	Stadium: Maryland SoccerPlex; Attendance: 1,003; Referee: Sorin Stoica; Assistant referees: Mark Remsa; Conor McCloskey; Fourth official: Sharon Gingrich

=== Final ===
November 12	#1 Georgetown	0–0 (a.e.t.) (4–5 p)	#2 Xavier	Boyds, MD
11:00 a.m. ET		Report		Stadium: Maryland SoccerPlex; Attendance: 727; Referee: Nikola Aleksic; Assistant referees: Robert Cordrey; Jason Blight; Fourth official: Peter Dhima
	Penalties
	Joe Buck (penalty missed); Ronan Dillow (penalty scored); Kyle Linhares (penalty scored); Jacob Murrell (penalty scored); Blaine Mabie (penalty scored); Trevor Burns (penalty missed)		(penalty scored) Makel Rasheed; (penalty scored) Grayson Elmquist; (penalty scored) Guilherme Vivaldini; (penalty missed) Cooper Forcellini; (penalty scored) Jonny Mennell; (penalty scored) Lotem Ben Dov

== Statistics ==
=== Goalscorers ===
There were 13 goals scored in 7 matches, for an average of 1.86 goals per match (as of November 12, 2023).

2 goals

- Brendan McSorley – Providence

1 goal

- Kyle Linhares – Georgetown
- Marlon Tabora – Georgetown
- Matthew Van Horn – Georgetown
- Max Viera – Georgetown
- Bruno Rosa – Providence
- Hugo Gerbore – Seton Hall
- Lenny Cidolit – St. John's
- Eli Conway – UConn
- Scott Testori – UConn
- Grayson Elmquist – Xavier
- Taylor Rhinehart – Xavier

== All-Tournament team ==
Player	Team
Kenny Nielsen	Georgetown
Kieran Sargeant	Georgetown
Marlon Tabora	Georgetown
Miguel Candela	Providence
Brendan McSorley	Providence
Eli Conway	UConn
Scott Testori	UConn
Dylan Kropp	Xavier
Johnny Mennell^	Xavier
Makel Rasheed	Xavier
Taylor Rhinehart*	Xavier

* Offensive MVP
^ Defensive MVP
