= Tom Carlin =

American soccer coach

Personal information
- Full name: Tom Carlin
- Position: Striker

Youth career
- Years: Team
- 1996–1998: Arcadia Knights

Managerial career
- 2000–2005: Arcadia Knights
- 2006: Northwestern Wildcats (assistant)
- 2007–2008: Villanova University (assistant)
- 2008–2023: Villanova Wildcats

Tom Carlin is an American former soccer coach who coached a majority of his career at Villanova University, where he served as the head coach from 2008 until 2023. He previously served as an assistant with the Wildcats in 1997. From 2000 to 2005, he was the head soccer coach at Arcadia University in Pennsylvania, where he posted a 99-23-3 record. He led that team to three Pennsylvania Athletic Conference titles and three NCAA championship appearances. In 2006, he was associate head coach at Northwestern University for one year.
