= Andreas Lindberg (football manager) =

Swedish footballer and manager

Personal information
- Date of birth: c. 1978 (age 47–48)
- Place of birth: Sweden
- Height: 6 ft 3 in (1.91 m)
- Position: Midfielder

College career
| Years | Team | Apps | (Gls) |
| 1998–2001 | LIU Southampton Colonials | | |

Managerial career
- 2002–2005: LIU Southampton Colonials
- 2006–2007: New York Hampton Surf
- 2007–2010: Metropolitan Oval U17s
- 2009–2017: LIU Post Pioneers
- 2018–: Seton Hall Pirates

Andreas Lindberg is a Swedish football manager who currently manages the Seton Hall University men's soccer team.

== Playing career ==
Lindberg, originally from Sweden was recruited to play college soccer at LIU Southampton.

== Coaching career ==
Ahead of coaching Seton Hall, Lindberg coach LIU Post, Metropolitan Oval, the NY Hampton Surf and LIU Southampton.

On December 11, 2017, Lindberg was named head coach of Seton Hall.

== Managerial record ==
| Season | Team | Overall | Conference | Standing | Postseason |
|---|---|---|---|---|---|
LIU Post (East Coast Conference) (2009–2017)
| 2009 | LIU Post | 12–5–2 | 5-2 | 2nd | |
| 2010 | LIU Post | 7–8–2 | 4-3-0 | 4th | |
| 2011 | LIU Post | 17–3–1 | 6-0-1 | 1st | NCAA Div. II Second Round |
| 2012 | LIU Post | 18–2–0 | 8-1-0 | 1st | NCAA Div. II First Round |
| 2013 | LIU Post | 18–2–2 | 8-0-2 | 1st | NCAA Div. II East Region Finals |
| 2014 | LIU Post | 16–5–2 | 8-1-1 | 1st (Tied) | NCAA Div. II Quarterfinals |
| 2015 | LIU Post | 15–3–3 | 9-1-0 | 1st | NCAA Div. II Quarterfinals |
| 2016 | LIU Post | 18–1–1 | 8-0-1 | 1st | NCAA Div. II Third Round |
| 2017 | LIU Post | 18–1–2 | 8-0-1 | 1st | NCAA Div. II Quarterfinals |
| LIU Post: | | 139–30–15 (.796) | 64–8–6 (.859) | | |
Seton Hall (Big East Conference) (2018–present)
| 2018 | Seton Hall | 6–7–2 | 2–6–1 | 9th | |
| 2019 | Seton Hall | 6-9-1 | 3-5-1 | 7th | |
| 2020 | Seton Hall | 10-2-3 | 5-1-2 | 2nd | NCAA Quarterfinals |
| 2021 | Seton Hall | 6-8-3 | 2-7-1 | 10th | |
| 2022 | Seton Hall | 7-4-7 | 4-1-5 | 2nd | NCAA First Round |
| Seton Hall: | | 35–30–16 (.531) | 16–36–10 (.339) | | |
| Total: | | 174–60–31 (.715) | | | |
National champion Postseason invitational champion Conference regular season champion Conference regular season and conference tournament champion Division regular season champion Division regular season and conference tournament champion Conference tournament champion

|conference=80–44–16 (.629)
