= 2020 Big East Conference men's soccer tournament =

- Classification: Division I
- Teams: 4
- Matches: 3
- Site: Shaw Field, Washington, D.C.
- Champions: Seton Hall (6th title)
- Broadcast: BEDN, FS2

The 2020 Big East men's soccer tournament was the 8th edition of the Big East Conference Men's Soccer Tournament. The tournament decided the Big East Conference champion and guaranteed representative into the 2020 NCAA Division I men's soccer tournament.

== Background ==
The 2020 Big East Conference Men's Soccer Tournament was originally to be played in November 2020. However, the Big East Conference postponed all fall sports with the hope to play them in the spring.

== Format ==
The top two teams in each division (east and midwest) qualified for the tournament. The tournament was hosted by the number 1 overall seed, Georgetown.

== Qualified teams ==
Seed	Team	Conference record
1	Georgetown	7–0–2
2	Marquette	5–1–1
3	Seton Hall	5–1–2
4	Creighton	5–3

== Bracket ==
Semifinals
E1	Georgetown	1
MW2	Creighton	0
E2	Seton Hall	4
MW1	Marquette	1

Finals
Georgetown	1
Seton Hall	2

== Matches ==
=== Semifinals ===
April 15, 2021	^{(E1)} Georgetown	1–0	^{(MW2)} Creighton	Washington, D.C.
12:00 p.m.	DaLuz 84'	Report		Stadium: Shaw Field; Attendance: 0 Referee: Mark Gorak

April 15, 2021	^{(MW1)} Marquette	1–4	^{(E2)} Seton Hall	Washington, D.C.
3:30 p.m.	Thornton 73'	Report	Sundell 6'; Williams 9', 59'; Tibbling 60'	Stadium: Shaw Field; Attendance: 0 Referee: J. G. Griggs

=== Final ===
April 17, 2021	^{(E1)} Georgetown	1–2	^{(E2)} Seton Hall	Washington, D.C.
3:00 p.m.	Zach Riviere 34'	Report	Camil Koreichi 16'; CJ Tibbling 63'	Stadium: Shaw Field; Attendance: 0
