= Trevor Burns =

American soccer player (born 2001)

Personal information
- Full name: Trevor Burns
- Date of birth: September 15, 2001 (age 25)
- Place of birth: Kansas City, Missouri, United States
- Height: 5 ft 8 in (1.73 m)
- Position: Midfielder

Team information
- Current team: Sporting Kansas City II
- Number: 47

Youth career
- 2013–2020: New England Revolution

College career
Years	Team	Apps	(Gls)
2020–2023	Georgetown Hoyas	45	(0)
2024–2025	Duke Blue Devils	35	(2)

Senior career*
Years	Team	Apps	(Gls)
2020	New England Revolution II	2	(0)
2026–	Sporting Kansas City II	0	(0)
- * Club domestic league appearances and goals as of February 9, 2026

Trevor Burns (born September 15, 2001) is an American professional soccer player who plays as a midfielder for Sporting Kansas City II in the MLS Next Pro.

== Career ==
=== Youth ===
Burns spent seven years with the New England Revolution academy. He made an appearance for the club's USL League One side, New England Revolution II, on July 25, 2020, appearing as a 70th-minute substitute during a 0–0 draw with Union Omaha.

=== College ===
Burns committed to play college soccer at Georgetown University in 2020. During his three seasons with the Hoyas, he made 45 appearances. In 2024, Trevor transferred to Duke University to finish his collegiate career with the Duke Blue Devils. In two season at Duke, he made 36 appearances, scoring 2 goals.

== Personal life ==
Trevor is the son of former professional soccer player Mike Burns, who played for Viborg FF, New England Revolution, San Jose Earthquakes, Kansas City Wizards, and earned 75 caps for the United States national team between 1992 and 1998. Mike Burns was also General Manager for New England between 2011 and 2019, and served as Sporting Director of Sporting Kansas City from 2024 to 2026.
