= Higgins Soccer Complex =

Soccer stadium in Philadelphia, Pennsylvania

Coordinates: 40.04190°N 75.34593°W

- Interactive map of Higgins Soccer Complex
- Capacity: 1,000
- Surface: FieldTurf
- Public transit: Villanova station

Construction
- Built: 2013-2014
- Opened: 2014
- Construction cost: $3 million
- Villanova Wildcats men's soccer Villanova Wildcats women's soccer

Higgins Soccer Complex is a 1,000-seat soccer-specific stadium in Philadelphia, Pennsylvania. It is home to the Villanova Wildcats men's and women's soccer teams. The facility opened in 2014 and cost $3 million. The field FieldTurf surface.

The field is adjacent to Zimmerman Field, which is used for practices.
