= Owen T. Carroll Field =

Stadium in South Orange, New Jersey, US

Coordinates: 40.74117°N 74.24757°W

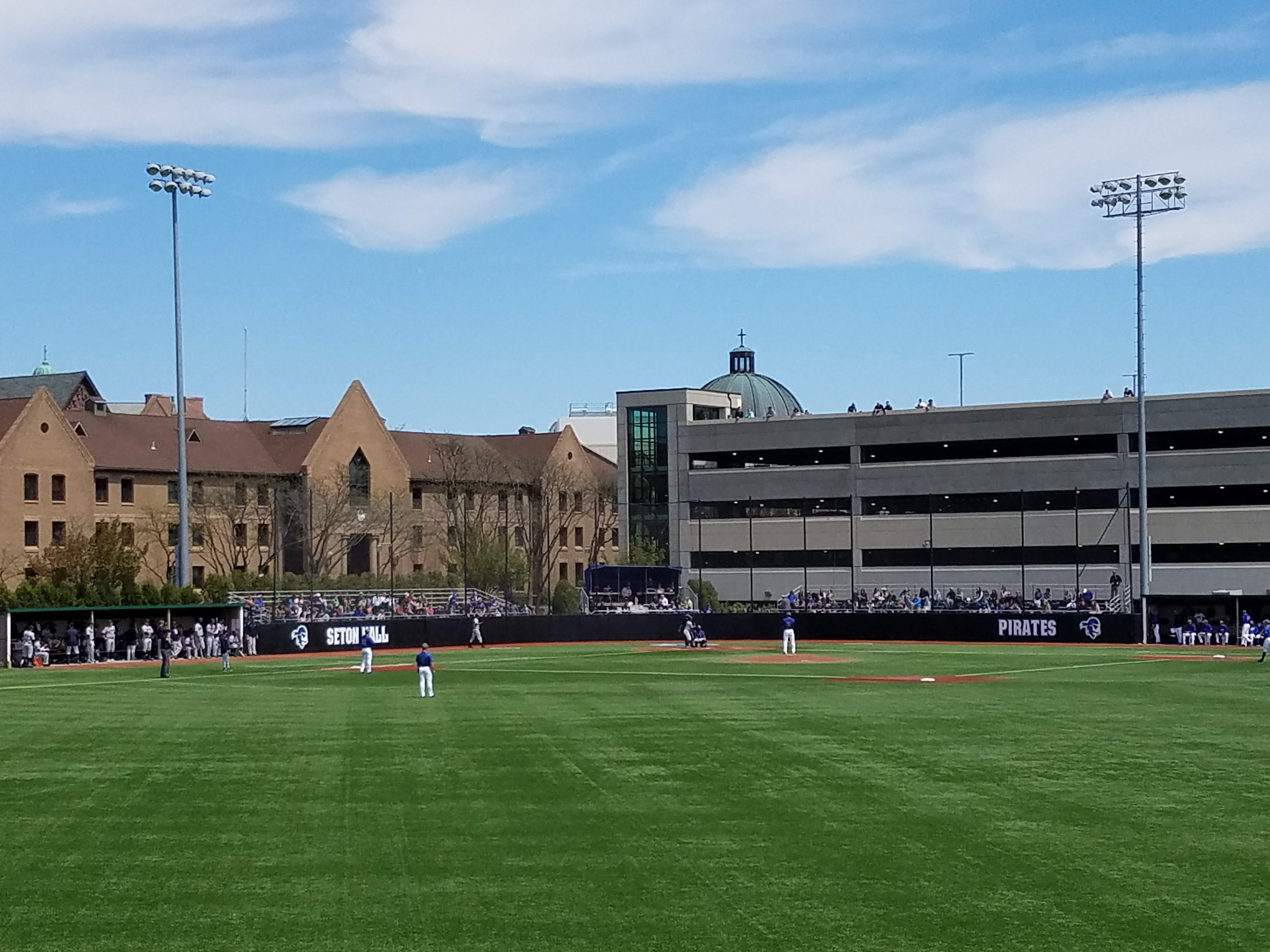
- View of the stadium in 2017
- Interactive map of Owen T. Carroll Field
- Address: 400 South Orange Ave 07079; South Orange, NJ; United States
- Owner: Seton Hall University
- Operator: Seton Hall Univ. Athletics
- Capacity: 1,800
- Type: Stadium
- Surface: FieldTurf
- Field size: List: Left field – 315 ft (96 m); Left Center – 375 ft (114 m); Center field – 395 ft (120 m); Right Center – 375 ft (114 m); Right field – 328 ft (100 m)
- Current use: Baseball; Soccer

Construction
- Opened: 1907; 119 years ago
- Renovated: 2019–2020
- Expanded: 2006, 2010, 2013

Tenants
- Seton Hall Pirates (NCAA) teams: baseball (1907–present); men's (1928–present) and women's soccer; football (1907–1932, 1973–1981)

Website
- shupirates.com/owen-t-carroll-field

Owen T. Carroll Field is a stadium in South Orange, New Jersey, on the campus of Seton Hall University. It is the home field of the Seton Hall Pirates baseball and men's and women's soccer teams. The stadium also hosted the Seton Hall football team until its final season in 1981 before the school cut the program.

== Overview ==
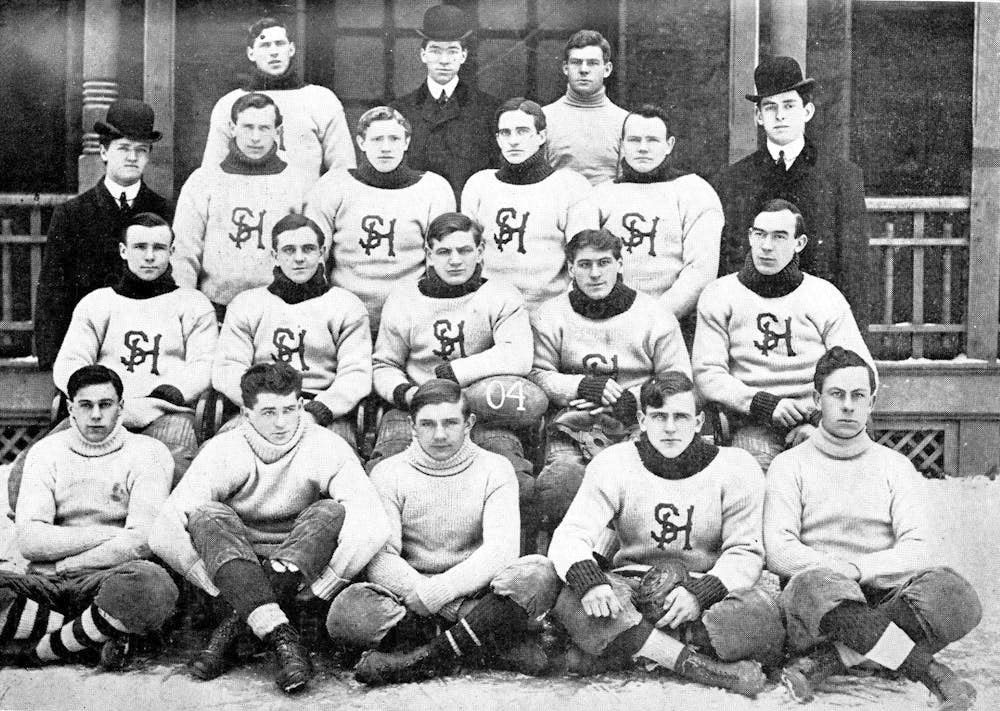
The football team of the university played at Carrol Field until the program was definitely dropped in 1982

The stadium, which has a capacity for 1,800 spectators, is named for Owen T. Carroll, former coach of the Seton Hall baseball team. The facility underwent a $6.5 million renovation in 2006 that included a new FieldTurf surface and light stanchions.

In June 2010, the Field Turf surface was upgraded once again, and in 2013, a new scoreboard was added.

In 2019, it was expected that the Seton Hall baseball team would be playing all of their games away from South Orange, including nine Big East "home" games in New York City while the facility undergoes major renovations.

== See also ==
- List of NCAA Division I baseball venues
