= Villanova Wildcats men's soccer =

American college soccer team

- Founded: 1978; 48 years ago
- University: Villanova University
- Head coach: Mark Fetrow 1st year
- Conference: Big East
- Location: Philadelphia, Pennsylvania, US
- Stadium: Higgins Soccer Complex (capacity: 1,000)
- Nickname: Cats
- Colors: Navy blue and white
Home	Away

NCAA tournament appearances
- 2016, 2021

The Villanova Wildcats men's soccer program represents Villanova University in all NCAA Division I men's college soccer competitions. Founded in 1978, the Wildcats compete in the Big East Conference. The Wildcats are coached by Tom Carlin. Villanova plays their home matches at Higgins Soccer Complex.

== Seasons ==
=== Year-by-year ===
Key

- – National champions
- – Conference champions
- – Division champions
- – NCAA tournament berth

Season	Head coach	Conference	Season results							Tournament results	
Season	Head coach	Conference	Overall			Conference				Conference	NCAA
Season	Head coach	Conference	W	L	T	W	L	T	Finish	Conference	NCAA
1982	Howard Graff	Independent	8	6	2	—	—	—	—	—	—
1983	Howard Graff	Independent	2	16	0	—	—	—	—	—	—
1984	Chris Jones	Independent	8	6	4	—	—	—	—	—	—
1985	Chris Jones	Big East	4	12	1	0	4	0	4th / 4, South	—	—
1986	Chris Jones	Big East	8	8	2	1	4	0	3rd / 5, South	—	—
1987	Chris Jones	Big East	9	8	1	1	4	1	4th / 5, South	—	—
1988	Chris Jones	Big East	6	9	2	1	3	0	5th / 5, South	—	—
1989	Chris Jones	Big East	7	12	0	0	4	0	5th / 5, South	—	—
1990	Chris Jones	Big East	9	8	0	3	4	0	7th / 9	—	—
1991	Larry Sullivan	Big East	11	7	2	2	2	2	4th / 9	Semifinals	—
1992	Larry Sullivan	Big East	9	8	1	2	6	0	9th / 9	—	—
1993	Larry Sullivan	Big East	6	10	2	4	3	1	4th / 9	Semifinals	—
1994	Larry Sullivan	Big East	6	11	1	2	5	1	7th / 9	—	—
1995	Larry Sullivan	Big East	6	9	2	4	7	0	11th / 12	—	—
1996	Larry Sullivan	Big East	7	8	3	3	6	2	10th / 12	—	—
1997	Larry Sullivan	Big East	5	9	5	3	4	3	6th / 12	Quarterfinals	—
1998	Larry Sullivan	Big East	5	10	0	1	8	0	12th / 12	—	—
1999	Larry Sullivan	Big East	2	15	0	0	11	0	12th / 12	—	—
2000	Larry Sullivan	Big East	6	10	2	2	8	2	11th / 12	—	—
2001	Larry Sullivan	Big East	5	13	0	3	7	0	9th / 12	—	—
2002	Larry Sullivan	Big East	5	13	0	2	8	0	11th / 12	—	—
2003	Larry Sullivan	Big East	10	8	1	4	6	0	8th / 12	Quarterfinals	—
2004	Larry Sullivan	Big East	7	5	5	5	3	2	4th / 12	Quarterfinals	—
2005	Larry Sullivan	Big East	7	7	4	6	4	1	4th / 8, Red	Quarterfinals	—
2006	Larry Sullivan	Big East	6	10	1	2	9	0	8th / 8, Red	—	—
2007	Larry Sullivan	Big East	10	9	1	5	5	1	6th / 8, Red	Quarterfinals	—
2008	Tom Carlin	Big East	7	10	2	4	5	2	5th / 8, Red	Semifinals	—
2009	Tom Carlin	Big East	9	8	2	5	5	1	4th / 8, Red	Quarterfinals	—
2010	Tom Carlin	Big East	8	8	3	4	3	2	4th / 8, Red	Quarterfinals	—
2011	Tom Carlin	Big East	8	9	4	4	5	1	5th / 8, Red	Semifinals	—
2012	Tom Carlin	Big East	12	6	2	3	3	2	4th / 8, Red	Quarterfinals	—
2013	Tom Carlin	Big East	8	9	1	3	6	0	8th / 10	—	—
2014	Tom Carlin	Big East	8	8	3	3	4	2	5th / 10	First round	—
2015	Tom Carlin	Big East	9	8	0	4	5	0	7th / 10	—	—
2016^	Tom Carlin	Big East	10	8	3	5	3	1	3rd / 10	Semifinals	First round
2017	Tom Carlin	Big East	7	11	0	2	7	0	10th / 10	—	—
2018	Tom Carlin	Big East	7	8	2	2	6	1	8th / 10	—	—
2019	Tom Carlin	Big East	9	8	7	2	6	1	9th / 10	—	—
2020	Tom Carlin	Big East	2	8	0	2	5	0	5th / 6, East	—	—
2021^	Tom Carlin	Big East	12	8	1	5	4	1	5th / 11	Semifinals	Second round
2022	Tom Carlin	Big East	6	8	3	2	6	1	10th / 11	—	—
2023	Tom Carlin	Big East	1	8	7	1	4	3	6th / 6, East	—	—
2024	Mark Fetrow	Big East	1	10	6	0	7	1	6th / 6, East	—	—

=== NCAA tournament results ===
November 17, 2016	Akron	2–0	Villanova	Akron, Ohio
5:00pm EST	Hinds 39', 73'	Report		Stadium: Cub Cadet Field; Attendance: 1,811; Referee: Chris Penso

November 18, 2021	Vermont	0–1	Villanova	Burlington, VT
6:00 p.m. EST	Zach Barrett (yellow card) 18'; Noah Egan (yellow card) 40'	Report	28' (pen.) Lyam MacKinnon; (yellow card) 63' Dominic Cyriacks	Stadium: Virtue Field; Attendance: 1,497; Referee: Jeremy Scheer

November 21, 2021	(4) Notre Dame	3–0	Villanova	South Bend, IN
5:00 PM EST	Jack Lynn 18'; Paddy Burns 36'; Daniel Russo (yellow card) 47'; Ethan O'Brien (yellow card) 59'; Ben Giacobello 85'	Report	(yellow card) 44' (yellow-red card) 83' Anthony Dragisics; (yellow card) 86' Luke Pompliano	Stadium: Alumni Stadium; Attendance: 891
