= Seton Hall Pirates men's soccer =

American college soccer team

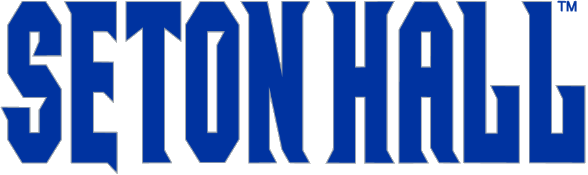
- Founded: 1928; 97 years ago
- University: Seton Hall University
- Head coach: Andreas Lindberg (6th season)
- Conference: Big East
- Location: South Orange, New Jersey
- Stadium: Owen T. Carroll Field (Capacity: 261)
- Nickname: Pirates
- Colors: Blue and white
Home	Away

NCAA Tournament Quarterfinals
- 1988, 2020

NCAA Tournament Round of 16
- 1988, 2001, 2020

NCAA Tournament Round of 32
- 1988, 1991, 1992, 2001, 2005, 2020, 2025

NCAA Tournament appearances
- 1986, 1987, 1988, 1990, 1991, 1992, 2001, 2002, 2003, 2004, 2005, 2020, 2022, 2025

Conference Tournament championships
- 1986, 1987, 1988, 1990, 1992, 2020

Conference Regular Season championships
- 1986, 1987, 1988, 1989, 1991

The Seton Hall Pirates men's soccer team represents Seton Hall University in all NCAA Division I men's college soccer competitions. The program was founded in 1928 –being coached by Tom O' Connor– and currently competes in the Big East Conference. Seton Hall is currently coached by Andreas Lindberg and play their home matches at Owen T. Carroll Field in South Orange, New Jersey.

== Team honors ==
=== Conference championships ===
key

- (S) – South division

Conference	Championship	Titles	Winning years
Big East	Tournament	5	1986, 1987, 1988, 1990, 1992, 2020
Big East	Regular season	6	1986 (S), 1987 (S), 1988 (S), 1989 (S), 1990, 1991

== Records ==
=== Coaching records ===
Years	Coach	Pld.	W	L	T	Pct.
1928	Tom O’Connor	7	3	3	1	.500
1938, 1941	George Miele	8	0	7	1	.063
1939	Edmund Piasecki	8	3	2	3	.563
1940	Michael Stanish	4	0	3	1	.125
1946–55	Bill Garry	87	52	25	10	.655
1956–57	Frank Boccia	21	13	6	2	.667
1958–84	Nick Menza	355	106	225	24	.332
1985–87	Ed Kelly	59	40	13	6	.729
1988–2011	Manfred Schellscheidt	371	204	129	38	.601
2012–17	Gerson Echeverry	101	28	63	10	.327
2018–	Andreas Lindberg	81	35	30	16	.531

=== Single-season records ===
Statistics below show the all-time program leaders.

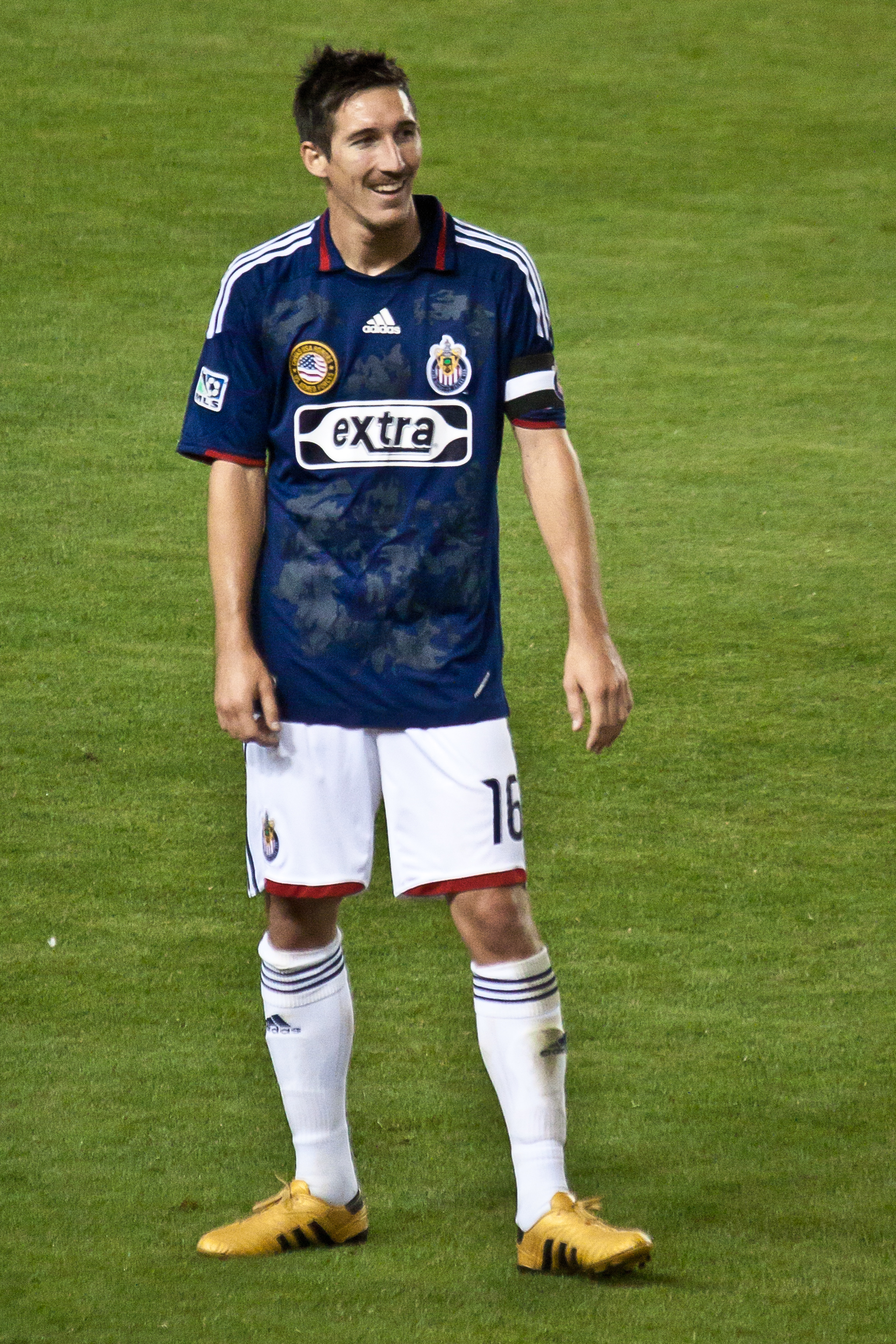
Sacha Kljestan holds the program record for most penalty kick goals and assists by a Seton Hall player.

Category	Record holder	Total
Points	(United States) Peter Matischak	57
Goals	(United States) Peter Matischak	23
Game-Winning Goals	(United States) Gerson Echeverry	6
Assists	(United States) Sacha Kljestan	15
Penalty Goals	(United States) Sacha Kljestan	6
Saves	(United States) Steve Armenti	5
Save Percentage	(United States) Nick Dell'Acqua	1.000
Goals Against Average	(United States) Boris Pardo	0.83

- All-Time record: 449–476–47 (Through 2017 season)

== NCAA Tournament history ==
Seton Hall has appeared in 13 NCAA Tournaments. Their most recent performance came in 2022. Their combined NCAA record is 8–13–0.

Key

- (1) – Title number
- a.e.t. – Match went to extra time
- p – Match decided by a penalty shootout after extra time

Season	Round	Opponent	Res.	Score
1986	Second round	Penn State	L	0–2 (a.e.t.)
1987	Second round	Rutgers	L	1–2
1988	Second round	LIU	W	5–2
1988	Quarterfinals	Indiana	L	1–3
1990	First round	Columbia	L	0–2
1991	First round	Adelphi	W	1–1 (? p)
1991	Second round	Yale	L	3–4 (a.e.t.)
1992	First round	Hartford	W	2–0
1992	Second round	Dartmouth	L	3–4
2001	First round	Coastal Carolina	W	2–1
2001	Second round	Virginia	W	1–0
2001	Third round	Fairleigh Dickinson	L	0–1
2002	First round	Penn	L	0–1 (a.e.t.)
2003	First round	Virginia	L	0–2
2004	First round	Hofstra	L	1–2
2005	First round	Hartwick	W	2–1
2005	Second round	Penn State	L	0–1
2020	Second round	Air Force	W	2–1
2020	Third Round	Virginia Tech	W	2–2 (7–6 p)
2020	Quarterfinals	Indiana	L	0–2
2022	First Round	New Hampshire	L	1–2
