= Southern Conference men's soccer tournament =

- Sport: Soccer
- Conference: Southern Conference
- Number of teams: 6
- Format: Single elimination
- Played: 1988–present
- Last contest: 2026
- Current champion: Liberty (1st title)
- Most championships: Furman (16 titles)
- Official website: soconsports.com/msoc

The Southern Conference men's soccer tournament is the conference championship tournament in men's soccer for the Southern Conference. The winner of the tournament receives the conference's automatic bid to the NCAA Division I men's soccer tournament.

Furman is the most winning team of the competition with 16 titles.

== Champions ==
=== Finals ===
Key

- (1) – Title number
- a.e.t. – Match went to extra time
- p – Match decided by a penalty shootout after extra time
- – Winning team won regular season

Ed.	Year	Champion	Score	Runner-up	Venue	City	MVP
1	1988	Furman (1)	1–0	The Citadel	Smith High School	Greensboro, NC	Rod Underwood, Furman
2	1989	Furman (2)	4–0	Appalachian State	Bryan Park	Greensboro, NC	Andrew Burr, Furman
3	1990	Appalachian St (1)	1–1 (4–3 p)	The Citadel	Bryan Park	Greensboro, NC	Andy Salandy, Appalachian St
4	1991	Furman (3)	3–0	Marshall	Bryan Park	Greensboro, NC	Andrew Zorovich, Furman
5	1992	Davidson (1)	3–1	Appalachian State	Bryan Park	Greensboro, NC	Ben Hayes, Davidson
6	1993	Furman (4)	3–2	Appalachian State	Bryan Park	Greensboro, NC	Jay Weyer, Furman
7	1994	Furman (5)	4–2 (a.e.t.)	Appalachian State	Bryan Park	Greensboro, NC	Brian Little, Furman
8	1995	Davidson (2)	1–0	Furman	Richardson Stadium	Davidson, NC	Alex Deegan, Davidson
9	1996	Furman (6)	4–2	Georgia Southern	Stone Stadium	Greenville, SC	Ryan Higginbotham, Furman
10	1997	Furman (7)	3–1	UNCG	Stone Stadium	Greenville, SC	Ryan Higginbotham, Furman
11	1998	UNCG (1)	1–0	Furman	Richardson Stadium	Davidson, NC	Nathan Kipp, UNC
12	1999	Furman (8)	3–2	UNCG	Blackbaud Stadium	Charleston, SC	Graham Seagraves, Furman
12	2000	Furman (9)	4–1	Appalachian State	Patriots Point	Mount Pleasant, SC	John Barry Nusum, Furman
13	2001	Furman (10)	2–1	UNCG	Patriots Point	Mount Pleasant, SC	Anthony Esquivel, Furman
14	2002	(No champion crowned) (Note: In 2002, one semifinal and the final match were canceled due to weather.)			Patriots Point	Mount Pleasant, SC	–
15	2003	Davidson (3)	1–0	Charleston	Patriots Point	Mount Pleasant, SC	Nick Hansell, Davidson
16	2004	Charleston (1)	1–0 (a.e.t.)	Davidson	Blackbaud Stadium	Charleston, SC	Ben Hollingsworth, Charleston
17	2005	UNCG (2)	2–1	Davidson	Blackbaud Stadium	Charleston, SC	Henning Jonasson, UNCG
18	2006	UNCG (3)	3–0	Georgia Southern	Stone Stadium	Greenville, SC	Henning Jonasson, UNCG
19	2007	Furman (11)	1–0 (a.e.t.)	UNCG	UNCG Soccer Stadium	Greensboro, NC	Bryan Amos, Furman
20	2008	UNCG (4) (Note: Later vacated)	2–1	Charleston	Alumni Stadium	Davidson, NC	Joe Burnett, UNC
21	2009	Wofford	2–1	Elon	Snyder Field	Spartanburg, SC	Wilson Hood, Wofford
22	2010	UNCG (5) (Note: Later vacated)	2–0	Furman	Patriots Point	Mount Pleasant, SC	Matt Strine, UNC
23	2011	Elon (1)	3–2	UNCG	Mackorell Soccer Complex	Boone, NC	Nick Millington, Elon
24	2012	Elon (2)	2–1	Wofford	WakeMed Soccer Park	Cary, NC	Gabe Latigue, Elon
25	2013	Elon (3)	1–0 (a.e.t.)	Wofford	Stone Stadium	Greenville, SC	Jason Waterman, Elon
26	2014	Furman (12)	1–0	Mercer	UNCG Soccer Stadium	Greensboro, NC	Clint Ritter, Furman
27	2015	Furman (13)	1–0	East Tennessee	Summers-Taylor Stadium	Johnson City, TN	Sven Lissek, Furman
28	2016	Mercer (1)	0–0 (4–1 p)	East Tennessee	UNCG Soccer Stadium	Greensboro, NC	Jeremy Booth, Mercer
29	2017	Mercer (2)	1–1 (3–2 p)	UNCG	Stone Stadium	Greenville, SC	Jeremy Booth, Mercer
30	2018	Furman (14)	3–0	UNCG	Summers-Taylor Stadium	Johnson City, TN	Laurence Wyke, Furman
31	2019	Mercer (3)	1–0	UNCG	UNCG Soccer Stadium	Greensboro, NC	JR DeRose, Mercer
32	2020	UNCG (6)	1–0	Belmont	UNCG Soccer Stadium	Greensboro, NC	Mani Austmann, UNCG
33	2021	Mercer (4)	4–3	Belmont	Betts Stadium	Macon, GA	Dylan Gaither, Mercer
34	2022	UNCG (7)	2–1	Mercer	UNCG Soccer Stadium	Greensboro, NC	Ismail El Harchi, UNCG
35	2023	Mercer (5)	2–0	Furman	Stone Stadium	Greenville, SC	Sekou Agard, Mercer
36	2024	Furman (15)	2–0	East Tennessee	Summers-Taylor Stadium	Johnston City, TN	Aaron Salinas, Furman
37	2025	Furman (16)	1–0 (a.e.t.)	UNCG	Stone Stadium	Greenville, SC	Diego Hernandez, Furman
38	2026	Liberty (1)	1–0	UNCG	UNCG Soccer Stadium	Greensboro, NC	Samson Kpardeh, Liberty

== Statistics ==
=== All-time champions ===
Key

- Teams in italic no longer member of the SoCon.
- ^{1} no longer sponsor men's soccer.

College	Titles	Last won	Runn.	Last lost
Furman	16	2025	4	2023
UNC Greensboro	7	2022	10	2026
Mercer	5	2023	2	2022
Davidson	3	2003	2	2005
Elon	3	2013	1	2009
Appalachian State^{1}	1	1990	5	2000
Charleston	1	2004	2	2008
Wofford	1	2009	2	2013
Liberty	1	2026	0	—N/a
East Tennessee State	0	—N/a	3	2024
Belmont	0	—N/a	2	2021
The Citadel	0	—N/a	2	1990
Georgia Southern	0	—N/a	2	2006
Marshall	0	—N/a	1	1991
