= 2019 Southern Conference men's soccer season =

- League: NCAA Division I
- Sport: Soccer
- Duration: August 30, 2019 – November 6, 2019
- Teams: 6

2020 MLS SuperDraft

Regular season
- Season MVP: Offensive: Defensive: Goalkeeper:

Tournament

Southern Conference men's soccer seasons
- ← 2018 2020 →

2019 Southern Conference men's soccer standings
	Conf.					Overall
Team	W		L		T	W		L		T
UNCG	5	–	1	–	0	8	–	9	–	1
Furman	5	–	1	–	0	11	–	7	–	1
ETSU	4	–	2	–	0	8	–	8	–	2
Mercer ‡	3	–	3	–	0	14	–	7	–	0
Wofford	2	–	3	–	1	4	–	13	–	1
Belmont	1	–	4	–	1	5	–	12	–	2
VMI	0	–	6	–	0	1	–	16	–	0
‡ – 2019 SoCon Tournament Champion + – Invited to the 2019 NCAA tournament; As of 22 November 2019; Rankings from United Soccer Coaches

The 2019 Southern Conference men's soccer season wias the 24th season of men's varsity soccer in the conference. The season began in late August 2019 and concluded in mid-November 2019.

UNCG won the regular season and Mercer won the tournament.

== Background ==
=== Previous season ===
The 2018 season saw Mercer win the regular season championship, posting a 12-4-2 overall record and a 5-1-0 record in SoCon play.

== Head coaches ==
As of the 2018 season

Team	Head coach	Previous job	Years at school	Overall record	Record at school	SoCon record	NCAA Tournaments	NCAA College Cups	NCAA Titles	Ref.
Belmont	David Costa	Xavier (asst.)	1	0–0–0 (–)	0–0–0 (–)	0–0–0 (–)	0	0	0	
East Tennessee State	David Casper	Kentucky (asst.)	2	9–7–1 (.559)	9–7–1 (.559)	4–1–1 (.750)	0	0	0	
Furman	Doug Allison	South Carolina (asst.)	24	285–131–54 (.664)	285–131–54 (.664)	114–43–18 (.703)	10	0	0	
Mercer	Brad Ruzzo	Bradley (asst.)	12	110–90–26 (.544)	110–90–26 (.544)	29–13–4 (.674)	2	0	0	
UNC Greensboro	Chris Rich	Duke (asst.)	1	0–0–0 (–)	0–0–0 (–)	0–0–0 (–)	0	0	0	
VMI	Charlie Hubbard	VMI (asst.)	1	0–0–0 (–)	0–0–0 (–)	0–0–0 (–)	0	0	0	
Wofford	Joel Tyson	Charlotte Independence (asst.)	1	0–0–0 (–)	0–0–0 (–)	0–0–0 (–)	0	0	0	

== Preseason ==
=== Preseason poll ===
The preseason poll was released on August 21, 2019.

	Team ranking	Points	First place votes
1.	Mercer	35	5
2.	Furman	31	2
3.	ETSU	27	0
4.	UNCG	20	0
5.	Belmont	15	0
6.	Wofford	13	0
7.	VMI	6	0

=== Preseason national polls ===
The preseason national polls will be released in July and August 2019.

	United; Soccer	CSN	Soccer; America	Top Drawer; Soccer
Belmont	—	—	—	—
ETSU	—	—	—	—
Furman	RV	RV	—	—
Mercer	—	—	—	—
UNCG	—	—	—	—
VMI	—	—	—	—
Wofford	—	—	—	—

== Regular season ==
=== Early season tournaments ===
Early season tournaments will be announced in late Spring and Summer 2019.

Team	Tournament	Finish
ETSU	VCU Tournament	3rd

=== Results ===
Index to colors and formatting
SoCon member won
SoCon member lost
SoCon member tied
SoCon teams in **bold**

All times Eastern time.† denotes Homecoming game

=== Week 1 (Aug. 25–31) ===
Date	Time (ET)	Visiting team	Home team	Site	TV	Result	Attendance	Report
August 30	4:00 p.m.	Winthrop	**VMI**	Patchin Field • Lexington, VA		**L** 0–2	63	Report
August 30	7:00 p.m.	**ETSU**	VCU	Sports Backers Stadium • Richmond, VA	ESPN+	**L** 0–1	827	Report
August 30	7:00 p.m.	**Mercer**	Cincinnati	Gettler Stadium • Cincinnati, OH		**W** 2–0	438	Report
August 30	7:00 p.m.	George Washington	**UNCG**	UNCG Soccer Stadium • Greensboro, NC		**W** 2–0	377	Report
August 30	7:30 p.m.	**Furman**	Duke	Koskinen Stadium • Durham, NC	ACCN+	**L** 0–1	1,173	Report
August 30	8:00 p.m.	**Belmont**	Bradley	Shea Stadium • Peoria, IL		**T** 0–0 ^{2OT}	1,233	Report
August 30	8:30 p.m.	**Wofford**	Houston Baptist	Sorrels Field • Houston, TX		**L** 0–2	Not reported	Report

=== Week 2 (Sep. 1–7) ===
Date	Time (ET)	Visiting team	Home team	Site	TV	Result	Attendance	Report
September 1	12:00 p.m.	**Furman**	Elon	Koskinen Stadium • Durham, NC	ACCN+	**T** 3–3 ^{2OT}	547	Report
September 1	8:00 p.m.	**Wofford**	UTRGV	Sorrels Field • Houston, TX		**L** 1–2	Not reported	Report
September 2	6:00 p.m.	**Belmont**	Georgia State	GSU Soccer Field • Decatur, GA		**L** 1–3	176	Report
September 2	7:00 p.m.	**ETSU**	Old Dominion	ODU Soccer Complex • Norfolk, VA	CUSA.tv	**W** 3–2 ^{2OT}	222	Report
September 2	7:00 p.m.	Presbyterian	**Mercer**	Betts Stadium • Macon, GA	SDN	**W** 2–1	336	Report
September 2	7:00 p.m.	**UNCG**	Radford	Patrick Cupp Stadium • Radford, VA	ESPN3	**L** 3–4 ^{OT}	297	Report
September 4	3:00 p.m.	**VMI**	UNC Asheville	Greenwood Field • Asheville, NC		**L** 1–2	407	Report
September 6	6:00 p.m.	**Furman**	Gardner–Webb	Greene–Harbison Stadium • Boiling Springs, NC	ESPN+	**W** 5–4 ^{OT}	427	Report
September 6	7:00 p.m.	**UNCG**	#19 Clemson	Riggs Field • Clemson, SC	ACCN	**L** 1–2	2,718	Report
September 6	7:00 p.m.	Winthrop	**Wofford**	Snyder Field • Spartanburg, SC	SDN	**W** 1–0	200	Report
September 6	8:00 p.m.	**Mercer**	UAB	BBVA Field • Birmingham, AL	CUSAtv	**W** 3–2 ^{OT}	479	Report
September 6	10:00 p.m.	**Belmont**	San Diego State	SDSU Sports Deck • San Diego, CA		**L** 1–2	244	Report
September 7	1:00 p.m.	**VMI**	Duquesne	Rooney Field • Pittsburgh, PA	ESPN+	**L** 0–1	121	Report
September 7	3:00 p.m.	Lipscomb	**ETSU**	Summers-Taylor Stadium • Johnson City, TN		**L** 0–3	312	Report

=== Week 3 (Sep. 8–14) ===
Date	Time (ET)	Visiting team	Home team	Site	TV	Result	Attendance	Report
September 8	3:30 p.m.	**Mercer**	Memphis	BBVA Field • Birmingham, AL		**W** 1–0	258	Report
September 8	5:00 p.m.	**Belmont**	San Diego	Torero Stadium • San Diego, CA		**L** 0–3	Not reported	Report
September 8	7:00 p.m.	**Furman**	Winthrop	Eagle Field • Rock Hill, SC	ESPN+	**W** 3–0	162	Report
September 8	7:00 p.m.	Gardner–Webb	**Wofford**	Snyder Field • Spartanburg, SC	SDN	**L** 0–1	162	Report
September 9	7:00 p.m.	**UNCG**	#20 North Carolina	UNC Soccer and Lacrosse Stadium • Chapel Hill, NC	ACCN+	**L** 0–1	1,085	Report
September 10	7:00 p.m.	**ETSU**	Marshall	Veterans Memorial Soccer Complex • Huntington, WV	CUSA.tv	**L** 1–2	288	Report
September 11	7:00 p.m.	UNC Asheville	**Furman**	Eugene Stone Stadium • Greenville, SC	SDN	**W** 2–1	589	Report
September 11	7:00 p.m.	**Mercer**	South Carolina	Eugene Stone Stadium • Columbia, SC	SECN	**L** 0–1 ^{OT}	1,929	Report
September 11	7:00 p.m.	**VMI**	Longwood	Longwood Athletics Complex • Farmville, VA	ESPN+	**L** 1–5	208	Report
September 13	5:00 p.m.	**Belmont**	Purdue Fort Wayne	Hefner Soccer Complex • Fort Wayne, IN		**L** 1–2	Not reported	Report
September 13	7:00 p.m.	**UNCG**	Campbell	Eakes Athletics Complex • Buies Creek, NC		**L** 0–2	255	Report
September 14	12:00 p.m.	Gardner–Webb	**VMI**	Patchin Field • Lexington, VA	SDN	**L** 1–2	74	Report
September 14	7:00 p.m.	Davidson	**Furman**	Eugene Stone Stadium • Greenville, SC	SDN	**W** 3–2	434	Report

=== Week 4 (Sep. 15–21) ===
Date	Time (ET)	Visiting team	Home team	Site	TV	Result	Attendance	Report
September 17	7:00 p.m.	Presbyterian	**ETSU**	Summers-Taylor Stadium • Johnson City, TN		**W** 3–0	Not reported	Report
September 17	7:00 p.m.	Jacksonville	**Mercer**	Betts Stadium • Macon, GA	SDN	**L** 1–2 ^{OT}	312	Report
September 17	7:00 p.m.	**VMI**	Liberty	Osborne Stadium • Lynchburg, VA		**L** 0–1	329	Report
September 17	7:00 p.m.	**Wofford**	High Point	Vert Stadium • High Point, NC	ESPN+	**L** 0–1	Not reported	Report
September 17	8:00 p.m.	Memphis	**Belmont**	E.S. Rose Park • Nashville, TN	ESPN+	**L** 0–2	235	Report
September 18	6:00 p.m.	**UNCG**	UNC Asheville	Greenwood Field • Asheville, NC	ESPN+	**W** 5–1	402	Report
September 18	7:00 p.m.	**Furman**	South Carolina	Eugene Stone Stadium • Columbia, SC	SECN	**L** 0–3	2,545	Report
September 21	12:00 p.m.	Saint Peter's	**VMI**	Patchin Field • Lexington, VA		**L** 0–5	88	Report
September 21	3:00 p.m.	Presbyterian	**Belmont**	E.S. Rose Park • Nashville, TN	ESPN+	**W** 2–0	195	Report
September 21	6:00 p.m.	**Wofford**	UNC Asheville	Greenwood Field • Asheville, NC		**W** 4–0	602	Report
September 21	7:00 p.m.	**ETSU**	High Point	Vert Stadium • High Point, NC		**W** 2–0	Not reported	Report
September 21	7:00 p.m.	USC Upstate	**Furman**	Eugene Stone Stadium • Greenville, SC	SDN	**W** 4–1	889	Report
September 21	7:00 p.m.	Appalachian State	**UNCG**	UNCG Soccer Stadium • Greensboro, NC	SDN	**L** 2–4	712	Report

=== Week 5 (Sep. 22–28) ===
Date	Time (ET)	Visiting team	Home team	Site	TV	Result	Attendance	Report
September 24	4:00 p.m.	**Belmont**	Eastern Illinois	Lakeside Field • Charleston, IL		**L** 2–3	115	Report
September 24	7:00 p.m.	#4 Clemson	**Furman**	Eugene Stone Stadium • Greenville, SC	ESPN+	**L** 0–2	2,712	Report
September 24	7:00 p.m.	**Mercer**	USC Upstate	County University Soccer Stadium • Spartanburg, SC	ESPN+	**W** 3–2 ^{2OT}	220	Report
September 24	7:00 p.m.	#10 Charlotte	**Wofford**	Snyder Field • Spartanburg, SC	SDN	**L** 2–3 ^{OT}	415	Report
September 25	7:00 p.m.	**UNCG**	Elon	Rudd Field • Elon, NC	CAAtv	**L** 0–3	729	Report
September 28	12:00 p.m.	Howard	**VMI**	Patchin Field • Lexington, VA		**L** 2–4	75	Report
September 28	7:00 p.m.	Georgia State	**ETSU**	Summers-Taylor Stadium • Johnson City, TN		**T** 2–2 ^{2OT}	382	Report
September 28	7:00 p.m.	**Furman**	Presbyterian	Martin Stadium at Edens Field • Clinton, SC		**L** 0–3	95	Report
September 28	7:00 p.m.	**Mercer**	Georgia Southern	Eagle Field at Erk Russle Park • Statesboro, GA		**W** 3–2	Not reported	Report
September 28	7:30 p.m.	Faulkner	**Belmont**	E.S. Rose Park • Nashville, TN	ESPN+	**W** 4–1	531	Report

=== Week 6 (Sep. 29–Oct. 5) ===
Date	Time (ET)	Visiting team	Home team	Site	TV	Result	Attendance	Report
October 1	4:00 p.m.	Regent	**VMI**	Patchin Field • Lexington, VA	ESPN3	**W** 4–0	87	Report
October 1	7:00 p.m.	**Belmont**	#24 Louisville	Lynn Stadium • Louisville, KY	ACCN	**L** 0–3	851	Report
October 1	7:00 p.m.	#9 Charlotte	**Furman**	Eugene Stone Stadium • Greenville, SC	SDN	**L** 1–2	406	Report
October 1	7:00 p.m.	Winthrop	**Mercer**	Betts Stadium • Macon, GA		**W** 2–1	176	Report
October 1	7:00 p.m.	**ETSU**	Appalachian State	ASU Soccer Stadium • Boone, NC		**T** 1–1 ^{2OT}	782	Report
October 1	7:00 p.m.	**UNCG**	Davidson	Alumni Soccer Stadium • Davidson, NC	A10N	**T** 1–1 ^{2OT}	338	Report
October 1	7:00 p.m.	Campbell	**Wofford**	Snyder Field • Spartanburg, SC	SDN	**L** 0–2	305	Report
October 4	7:00 p.m.	**Wofford**	Georgia Southern	Eagle Field at Erk Russle Park • Statesboro, GA		**L** 2–3	351	Report
October 5	3:00 p.m.	**VMI**	NJIT	Lubetkin Field • Newark, NJ		**L** 0–5	650	Report
October 5	4:00 p.m.	**UNCG**	High Point	Vert Stadium • High Point, NC		**L** 0–1	628	Report
October 5	7:00 p.m.	**Mercer**	Georgia State	GSU Soccer Field • Decatur, GA		**L** 1–2 ^{OT}	329	Report
October 5	7:30 p.m.	Kentucky	**ETSU**	Summers-Taylor Stadium • Johnson City, TN	ESPN+	**L** 0–1	827	Report

=== Week 7 (Oct. 6–12) ===
Date	Time (ET)	Visiting team	Home team	Site	TV	Result	Attendance	Report
October 7	6:00 p.m.	North Florida	**Mercer**	Betts Stadium • Macon, GA		**W** 2–0	219	Report
October 8	7:00 p.m.	**ETSU**	NC State	Method Road • Raleigh, NC	ACCN+	**L** 0–1	389	Report
October 8	7:00 p.m.	North Greenville	**Furman**	Stone III Stadium • Greenville, SC		**W** 4–1	822	Report
October 8	7:00 p.m.	Longwood	**Wofford**	Snyder Field • Spartanburg, SC	SDN	**L** 1–2 ^{OT}	213	Report
October 12	5:00 p.m.	**Wofford**	**Belmont**	E.S. Rose Park • Nashville, TN	ESPN+	**T** 3–3 ^{2OT}	237	Report
October 12	7:00 p.m.	**ETSU**	**Furman**	Stone III Stadium • Greenville, SC	ESPN+	**FUR** 2–0	701	Report
October 12	7:00 p.m.	**VMI**	**UNCG**	UNCG Soccer Stadium • Greensboro, NC	SDN	**UNCG** 4–0	300	Report

=== Week 8 (Oct. 13–19) ===
Date	Time (ET)	Visiting team	Home team	Site	TV	Result	Attendance	Report
October 15	4:00 p.m.	Furman	**VMI**	Patchin Field • Lexington, VA		**FUR** 3–0	85	Report
October 15	7:00 p.m.	ETSU	Davidson	Alumni Soccer Stadium • Charlotte, NC		**W** 2–1	523	Report
October 15	7:00 p.m.	Mercer	**Wofford**	Snyder Field • Spartanburg, SC		**WOF** 3–2 ^{OT}	254	Report
October 15	7:30 p.m.	UNCG	**Belmont**	E.S. Rose Park • Nashville, TN	ESPN+	**UNCG** 2–1	381	Report
October 19	12:00 p.m.	ETSU	**VMI**	Patchin Field • Lexington, VA		**ETSU** 3–0	78	Report
October 19	7:00 p.m.	Belmont	**Mercer**	Betts Stadium • Macon, GA				
October 19	7:00 p.m.	Wofford	**UNCG**	UNCG Soccer Stadium • Greensboro, NC	SDN			

=== Week 9 (Oct. 20–26) ===
Date	Time (ET)	Visiting team	Home team	Site	TV	Result	Attendance	Report
October 22	6:00 p.m.	VMI	**Wofford**	Snyder Field • Spartanburg, SC	SDN			
October 22	7:00 p.m.	Mercer	**ETSU**	Summers-Taylor Stadium • Johnson City, TN				
October 22	7:00 p.m.	UNCG	**Furman**	Stone III Stadium • Greenville, SC	SDN			
October 26	12:00 p.m.	Belmont	**VMI**	Patchin Field • Lexington, VA				
October 26	7:00 p.m.	ETSU	**UNCG**	UNCG Soccer Stadium • Greensboro, NC				
October 26	7:00 p.m.	Furman	**Mercer**	Betts Stadium • Macon, GA	ESPN3			
October 26	7:00 p.m.	Wofford	USC Upstate	County University Soccer Stadium • Spartanburg, SC				

=== Week 10 (Oct. 27–Nov. 2) ===
Date	Time (ET)	Visiting team	Home team	Site	TV	Result	Attendance	Report
October 29	7:00 p.m.	**Furman**	Wofford	Snyder Field • Spartanburg, SC	SDN			
October 29	7:00 p.m.	**Mercer**	UNCG	UNCG Soccer Stadium • Greensboro, NC	SDN			
October 29	7:30 p.m.	**ETSU**	Belmont	E.S. Rose Park • Nashville, TN				
November 2	5:00 p.m.	**Mercer**	VMI	Patchin Field • Lexington, VA				
November 2	7:00 p.m.	**Belmont**	Furman	Stone III Stadium • Greenville, SC				
November 2	7:00 p.m.	Old Dominion	UNCG	UNCG Soccer Stadium • Greensboro, NC	ESPN3			
November 2	7:30 p.m.	**Wofford**	ETSU	Summers-Taylor Stadium • Johnson City, TN				

== Postseason ==
=== SoCon Tournament ===
Wild card
6	Belmont	4
7	VMI	0

Quarterfinals
3	ETSU	0
6	Belmont	2
4	Mercer	3
5	Wofford	0

Semifinals
2	UNCG (2OT)	3
6	Belmont	2
1	Furman	2
4	Mercer (OT)	3

Final
2	UNCG	0
4	Mercer	1

=== NCAA tournament ===
Seed	Region	School	1st round	2nd round	3rd round	Quarterfinals	Semifinals	Championship
—N/a	4	Mercer	L, 1–3 vs. Charlotte	—	—	—	—	—

== Rankings ==
=== National rankings ===
	Improvement in ranking
	Drop in ranking
RV	Received votes but were not ranked in Top 25
NV	No votes received

		Pre	Wk 1	Wk 2	Wk 3	Wk 4	Wk 5	Wk 6	Wk 7	Wk 8	Wk 9	Wk 10	Wk 11	Wk 12	Wk 13	Wk 14	Wk 15	Wk 16	Final
Belmont	USC	NV	NV	NV	NV	NV	NV	NV							None released				
Belmont	TDS	NV	NV	NV	NV	NV	NV	NV	NV										
East Tennessee State	USC	NV	NV	NV	NV	NV	NV	NV							None released				
East Tennessee State	TDS	NV	NV	NV	NV	NV	NV	NV	NV										
Furman	USC	RV	NV	RV	NV	NV	NV	NV							None released				
Furman	TDS	NV	NV	NV	NV	NV	NV	NV	NV										
Mercer	USC	NV	RV	RV	NV	NV	NV	NV							None released				
Mercer	TDS	NV	NV	NV	NV	NV	NV	NV	NV										
UNC Greensboro	USC	NV	NV	NV	NV	NV	NV	NV							None released				
UNC Greensboro	TDS	NV	NV	NV	NV	NV	NV	NV	NV										
VMI	USC	NV	NV	NV	NV	NV	NV	NV							None released				
VMI	TDS	NV	NV	NV	NV	NV	NV	NV	NV										
Wofford	USC	NV	NV	NV	NV	NV	NV	NV							None released				
Wofford	TDS	NV	NV	NV	NV	NV	NV	NV	NV										

=== Regional rankings - South Region ===
	Improvement in ranking
	Drop in ranking
RV	Received votes but were not ranked in Top 10
NV	No votes received

The United Soccer Coaches' south region ranks teams among the ACC, Atlantic Sun, and SoCon.

	Wk 1	Wk 2	Wk 3	Wk 4	Wk 5	Wk 6	Wk 7	Wk 8	Wk 9	Wk 10	Wk 11	Wk 12
Belmont	NV	NV	NV	NV	NV	NV						
East Tennessee State	NV	NV	NV	NV	NV	NV						
Furman	NV	NV	NV	NV	NV	NV						
Mercer	NV	NV	NV	NV	NV	NV						
UNC Greensboro	NV	NV	NV	NV	NV	NV						
VMI	NV	NV	NV	NV	NV	NV						
Wofford	NV	NV	NV	NV	NV	NV						

== Awards and honors ==
=== Players of the Week ===
Week	Offensive			Defensive			Ref.
Week	Player	Position	Team	Player	Position	Team	Ref.
Sep. 3	Trevor Martineau	FW	Mercer	JR DeRose	GK	Mercer	
Sep. 10	Trevor Martineau	FW	Mercer	Cole McLagan	DF	Furman	
Sep. 17	Emery May	MF	Furman	Jack Shiels	DF	Furman	
Sep. 24	Hauk Andreas Fossen	FW	ETSU	Josh Perryman	GK	ETSU	
Oct. 1	Trevor Martineau	FW	Mercer	Joe Pickering	DF	ETSU	
Oct. 8	Trevor Martineau	FW	Mercer	JR DeRose	GK	Mercer	
Oct. 15	Niccolo Dagnoni	FW	Belmont	Cole McLagan	DF	Furman	
Oct. 22							
Oct. 29							
Nov. 5							

=== Postseason honors ===
2019 Southern Conference Men's Soccer Individual Awards
Award	Recipient(s)
Offensive Player of the Year	
Defensive Player of the Year	
Goalkeeper of the Year	
Coach of the Year	
Newcomer of the Year	

2019 SoCon Men's Soccer All-Conference Teams
First Team	Second Team	Newcomer Team

== 2020 MLS Draft ==
The 2020 MLS SuperDraft was held on January 9, 2020. No players from the SoCon were selected in the draft.

== Homegrown players ==
The Homegrown Player Rule is a Major League Soccer program that allows MLS teams to sign local players from their own development academies directly to MLS first team rosters. Before the creation of the rule in 2008, every player entering Major League Soccer had to be assigned through one of the existing MLS player allocation processes, such as the MLS SuperDraft.

To place a player on its homegrown player list, making him eligible to sign as a homegrown player, players must have resided in that club's home territory and participated in the club's youth development system for at least one year. Players can play college soccer and still be eligible to sign a homegrown contract.

Original MLS team	Player	Pos.	School	Ref.
