= 2020 Southern Conference men's soccer season =

- League: NCAA Division I
- Sport: Soccer
- Duration: February 3 – April 17, 2021
- Teams: 6

2021 MLS SuperDraft

Regular season
- Season MVP: Offensive: Defensive: Goalkeeper:

Tournament

Southern Conference men's soccer seasons
- ← 2019 2021 →

2020 Southern Conference men's soccer standings
	Conf.					Overall
Team	W		L		T	W		L		T
Furman	5	–	0	–	1	7	–	2	–	1
UNCG ‡	3	–	1	–	2	9	–	3	–	2
East Tennessee State	3	–	1	–	2	3	–	5	–	3
Belmont	3	–	2	–	1	7	–	3	–	2
Mercer	2	–	3	–	1	4	–	9	–	1
Wofford	1	–	4	–	1	1	–	7	–	1
VMI	0	–	6	–	0	2	–	9	–	0
‡– 2020 SoCon Tournament Champion + – Also invited to the 2020 NCAA tournament; As of May 3, 2021; Rankings from United Soccer Coaches

The 2020 Southern Conference men's soccer season is the 25th season of men's varsity soccer in the conference. The season was originally slated to begin on August 28 and conclude on November 4, 2020, culminating with the 2020 Southern Conference Men's Soccer Tournament.

On August 13, 2020, the NCAA suspended all fall championships, which coincided with the Southern Conference suspending all fall sports through the end of the calendar year. On September 16, 2020 the NCAA voted on men's soccer resuming play for the 2020–21 academic year on February 3, 2021 as the earliest date to schedule fixtures and April 17, 2021 as the latest date to schedule fixtures.

Despite the delay, teams on an individual basis can schedule competitive fixtures during the Fall 2020 semester. Thus far, Mercer is the only SoCon team that has opted to play games in the fall.

== Background ==
=== Previous season ===
The 2019 season saw Furman win the SoCon regular season championship, posting a 5–1–0 SoCon record and a 11–7–1 season record. Mercer successfully three-peated in the SoCon Tournament, winning their third consecutive SoCon Tournament championship.

In the 2019 NCAA Division I Men's Soccer Tournament, Mercer lost in the opening round to Charlotte.

=== Coaching changes ===
The 2019–20 offseason saw Charlie Hubbard depart VMI as a head coach. On March 5, 2020, Hubbard resigned to take an assistant coach position with James Madison University. Hubbard coached VMI for one season and finished with an overall record of 1–16–0. On March 23, 2020, VMI assistant coach, Max Watson, was promoted to head coach.

School	Outgoing coach	Manner of departure	Date of vacancy	Position in table	Incoming coach	Date of appointment
VMI	(United States) Charlie Hubbard	Hired by James Madison (asst.)	March 5, 2020	Preseason	(United States) Max Watson	March 23, 2020

== Head coaches ==
As of the 2019 season

Team	Head coach	Previous job	Years at school	Overall record	Record at school	SoCon record	NCAA Tournaments	NCAA College Cups	NCAA Titles	Ref.
Belmont	David Costa	Xavier (asst.)	2	5–12–2 (.316)	5–12–2 (.316)	1–4–1 (.250)	0	0	0	
East Tennessee State	David Casper	Kentucky (asst.)	3	17–15–3 (.529)	17–15–3 (.529)	8–3–1 (.708)	0	0	0	
Furman	Doug Allison	South Carolina (asst.)	25	296–138–55 (.662)	296–138–55 (.662)	119–44–18 (.707)	10	0	0	
Mercer	Brad Ruzzo	Bradley (asst.)	13	124–97–26 (.555)	124–97–26 (.555)	32–16–4 (.654)	3	0	0	
UNC Greensboro	Chris Rich	Duke (asst.)	2	8–9–1 (.472)	8–9–1 (.472)	5–1–0 (.833)	0	0	0	
VMI	Max Watson	VMI (asst.)	1	0–0–0 (–)	0–0–0 (–)	0–0–0 (–)	0	0	0	
Wofford	Joel Tyson	Charlotte Independence (asst.)	2	4–13–1 (.250)	4–13–1 (.250)	2–3–1 (.417)	0	0	0	

== Fall 2020 season ==
=== Fall matches ===
Mercer University played competitive matches during the fall.

Index to colors and formatting
SoCon member won
SoCon member lost
SoCon member tied
SoCon teams in **bold**

All times Eastern time.

Date	Time (ET)	Visiting team	Home team	Site	Result	Attendance
September 18	7:00 p.m.	Georgia State	**Mercer**	Betts Stadium • Macon, GA	**L** 1–2	161
September 22	7:00 p.m.	Georgia Southern	**Mercer**	Betts Stadium • Macon, GA	**W** 3–0	161
October 6	7:00 p.m.	**Mercer**	Georgia State	GSU Soccer Field • Atlanta, GA	**L** 0–2	298
October 9	6:00 p.m.	South Carolina	**Mercer**	Betts Stadium • Macon, GA	**L** 0–1	116
October 14	7:00 p.m.	**Mercer**	No. 4 Kentucky	Bell Soccer Complex • Lexington, KY	**L** 1–3	97

=== Rankings ===
==== United Soccer Coaches ====
During the fall 2020 season, United Soccer Coaches ran a Top 5 poll for the programs playing in fall.

	Improvement in ranking
	Drop in ranking
RV	Received votes but were not ranked in Top 5
NV	No votes received

	Wk 1	Wk 2	Wk 3	Wk 4	Wk 5	Wk 6	Wk 7	Wk 8	Wk 9	Wk 10	Wk 11	Wk 12
Mercer	NV	NV	NV	NV	NV	NV	NV	NV	NV	NV	NV	NV

==== TopDrawerSoccer.com ====
During the fall 2020 season, United Soccer Coaches ran a Top 10 poll for the programs playing in fall.

	Improvement in ranking
	Drop in ranking
RV	Received votes but were not ranked in Top 10
NV	No votes received

	Wk 1	Wk 2	Wk 3	Wk 4	Wk 5	Wk 6	Wk 7	Wk 8	Wk 9	Wk 10	Wk 11	Wk 12
Mercer	NV	NV	NV	NV	NV	NV	NV	NV	NV	NV	NV	NV

=== Awards and honors ===
Date	Player	Position	School	Honor	Ref.
September 22, 2020	Trevor Martineau	FW	Mercer	TopDrawer Soccer Team of the Week	

== Spring 2021 season ==
=== Preseason poll ===
The preseason poll will be released in December 2020 or January 2021.

	Team ranking	Points	First place votes
1.			
2.			
3.			
4.			
5.			
6.			
7.			

=== Preseason national polls ===
The preseason national polls were originally to be released in July and August 2020. Only CollegeSoccerNews.com released a preseason poll for 2020.

	United; Soccer	CSN	Soccer; America	Top Drawer; Soccer
Belmont	—	—	—	—
ETSU	—	—	—	—
Furman	—	—	—	—
Mercer	—	—	—	—
UNCG	—	—	—	—
VMI	—	—	—	—
Wofford	—	—	—	—

=== Early season tournaments ===
Early season tournaments will be announced in late Spring and Summer 2019.

Team	Tournament	Finish

=== Results ===
Index to colors and formatting
SoCon member won
SoCon member lost
SoCon member tied
SoCon teams in **bold**

All times Eastern time.† denotes Homecoming game

=== Rankings ===
==== National rankings ====
	Improvement in ranking
	Drop in ranking
RV	Received votes but were not ranked in Top 25
NV	No votes received

		Pre	Wk 1	Wk 2	Wk 3	Wk 4	Wk 5	Wk 6	Wk 7	Wk 8	Wk 9	Wk 10	Wk 11	Wk 12	Wk 13	Wk 14	Wk 15	Wk 16	Final
Belmont	USC														None released				
Belmont	TDS																		
East Tennessee State	USC														None released				
East Tennessee State	TDS																		
Furman	USC														None released				
Furman	TDS																		
Mercer	USC														None released				
Mercer	TDS																		
UNC Greensboro	USC														None released				
UNC Greensboro	TDS																		
VMI	USC														None released				
VMI	TDS																		
Wofford	USC														None released				
Wofford	TDS																		

==== Regional rankings - South Region ====
	Improvement in ranking
	Drop in ranking
RV	Received votes but were not ranked in Top 10
NV	No votes received

The United Soccer Coaches' south region ranks teams among the ACC, Atlantic Sun, and SoCon.

	Wk 1	Wk 2	Wk 3	Wk 4	Wk 5	Wk 6	Wk 7	Wk 8	Wk 9	Wk 10	Wk 11	Wk 12
Belmont												
East Tennessee State												
Furman												
Mercer												
UNC Greensboro												
VMI												
Wofford												

=== Players of the Week ===
Week	Offensive			Defensive			Ref.
Week	Player	Position	Team	Player	Position	Team	Ref.

== Postseason ==
=== Awards and honors ===
2020 Southern Conference Men's Soccer Individual Awards
Award	Recipient(s)
Player of the Year	Ben Hale, Furman
Goalkeeper of the Year	Ben Hale, Furman
Coach of the Year	Doug Allison, Furman
Freshmen of the Year	Jake Raine, Furman
Freshmen of the Year	Théo Collomb, UNC Greensboro

2020 SoCon Men's Soccer All-Conference Teams
First Team	Second Team	Freshman Team
Shaun-Chris Joash, Furman; Jake Raine, Furman; Théo Collomb, UNCG; Miles Fenton, Furman; Callum Holland, Furman; Dylan Gaither, Mercer; Fernando Garcia, UNCG; Cole McLagan, Furman; Emmanuel Hagan, UNCG; Buster Sjöberg, Wofford; Ben Hale, Furman	Niccolo Dagnoni, Belmont; Liam O’Brien, Belmont; Jared Leheta, ETSU; Dawson Gideon, Mercer; AJ Chastonay, Belmont; Kieran Richards, ETSU; Mani Austmann, UNCG; Jack Shaw, Belmont; Tommy Kay, Furman; Kareve Richards, Mercer; Drew Romig, Belmont	AJ Chastonay, Belmont; Michael Saunders, Belmont; Eric Stiles, Belmont; Jared Leheta, ETSU; Tarik Pannholzer, ETSU; Josh Hosie, Furman; Sam Miller, Furman; Jake Raine, Furman; Nick Wanzer, Mercer; Théo Collomb, UNCG; Emmanuel Hagan, UNCG; Niclas Wild, UNCG

=== SoCon Tournament ===
Semifinals
1	Furman	1
4	Belmont	3
3	East Tennessee State	1
2	UNC Greensboro	2

Finals
4	Belmont	0
2	UNC Greensboro	1

=== NCAA tournament ===
Seed	School	1st round	2nd round	3rd round	Quarterfinals	Semifinals	Championship
—N/a	UNC Greensboro	L, 2–3 vs. Omaha					

== 2021 MLS Draft ==
The 2021 MLS SuperDraft was held on January 21, 2021. No players from the SoCon were selected in the draft.
