= 2016 Southern Conference men's soccer season =

- League: NCAA Division I
- Sport: Soccer
- Duration: August, 2016 – November, 2016
- Teams: 10

Regular season
- Season champions: East Tennessee State
- Runners-up: Mercer
- Season MVP: Will Bagrou

Tournament
- Champions: Mercer
- Runners-up: East Tennessee State

Southern Conference men's soccer seasons
- ← 2015 2017 →

2016 Southern Conference men's soccer standings
	Conf.					Overall
Team	W		L		T	W		L		T
East Tenn. State+	7	–	1	–	3	12	–	5	–	3
Mercer ‡	7	–	3	–	1	13	–	7	–	1
Wofford	6	–	4	–	0	12	–	7	–	0
UNC Greensboro	6	–	4	–	0	11	–	7	–	2
Furman	2	–	6	–	2	6	–	9	–	3
VMI	0	–	10	–	0	0	–	17	–	0
‡-2016 SoCon Tournament Champion +-Invited to the 2016 NCAA Division I Men's Soccer Championship; As of 18 November 2016; Rankings from NSCAA

The 2016 Southern Conference men's soccer season was the 21st season of men's varsity soccer in the conference.

The UNC Greensboro Spartans are the defending regular season champions, and the Furman Paladins are the defending tournament champions.

== Changes from 2015 ==
- None

== Teams ==
=== Stadia and locations ===
Team	Location	Stadium	Capacity
East Tennessee State Buccaneers	Johnson City, Tennessee	Summers-Taylor Stadium	1,000
Furman Paladins	Greenville, South Carolina	Stone III Stadium	3,000
Mercer Bears	Macon, Georgia	Bear Field	300
UNC Greensboro Spartans	Greensboro, North Carolina	UNCG Soccer Stadium	3,540
VMI Keydets	Lexington, Virginia	Patchin Field	1,000
Wofford Terriers	Spartanburg, South Carolina	Snyder Field	2,250

- Chattanooga, The Citadel, Samford and West Carolina do not sponsor men's soccer

== Regular season ==
=== Results ===
Each team played their conference opponent twice: once home, and once away.

Team/opponent	ETS	FUR	MER	NCG	VMI	WOF
East Tennessee State Buccaneers		0–0	2–0	1–0	5–1	2–1
Furman Paladins	0–0		0–1	2–3	3–2	2–3
Mercer Bears	2–3	2–1		2–1	5–0	2–0
UNC Greensboro Spartans	3–4	1–0	2–1		8–1	0–1
VMI Keydets	1–5	0–6	0–2	0–4		0–1
Wofford Terriers	1–0	2–1	1–3	1–2	6–1	

=== Rankings ===
Legend
Increase in ranking
Decrease in ranking
Not ranked previous week

		Pre	Wk 1	Wk 2	Wk 3	Wk 4	Wk 5	Wk 6	Wk 7	Wk 8	Wk 9	Wk 10	Wk 11	Wk 12	Final
East Tennessee State	C										RV	RV	RV	RV	NR
Furman	C														
Mercer	C										RV	NR			
UNC Greensboro	C														
VMI	C														
Wofford	C														

== Postseason ==
=== SoCon Tournament ===
Tournament details to be announced.

=== NCAA tournament ===
Seed	Region	School	1st round	2nd round	3rd round	Quarterfinals	Semifinals	Championship
—	Clemson	Mercer	L, 0–1 vs. South Carolina					
—	Winston-Salem	East Tennessee State	L, 0–1 vs. Virginia Tech					

== All-SoCon Sun awards and teams ==
2016 SoCon Men's Soccer Individual Awards
Award	Recipient(s)
Player of the Year	Will Bagrou, Mercer
Goalkeeper of the Year	Jonny Sutherland, ETSU
Coach of the Year	Bo Oshoniyi, ETSU
Freshman of the Year	Joe Pickering, ETSU

2016 SoCon Men's Soccer All-Conference Teams
First Team	Second Team	Rookie Team
F Fletcher Ekern, ETSU; F Lewis Hawke, Furman; F Will Bagrou, Mercer; F Damieon Thomas, UNCG; MF Serge Gomis, ETSU; MF Leeroy Maguraushe, UNCG; MF Jordan Duru, Mercer; D Chase Clack, ETSU; D Kyle McLagan, Furman; D Ian Antley, Mercer; D Conner Antley, Mercer; GK Jonny Sutherland, ETSU	F Joao Ramalho, ETSU; F Lucas Altman, Wofford; F Matthew Aurednik, Wofford; MF Charlie Machell, ETSU; MF Marco Ortiz, Furman; MF Connor Donohue, Wofford; D Joe Pickering, ETSU; D Eric Gunnarsson, UNCG; D Kyle Nelson, Wofford; GK Jeremy Booth, Mercer; GK Joe Wichmann, Wofford	Javier Alberto, ETSU; Joe Pickering, ETSU; Emery May, Furman; Roberto Arteaga, Mercer; Jacob Chadwell, Mercer; Casey Penland, UNCG; Lucas Altman, Wofford; Dredon Kelly, Wofford; Sam Ross, Wofford; Austin Tuggle, Wofford; Christian Womeldorph, Wofford

== See also ==
- 2016 NCAA Division I men's soccer season
- 2016 Southern Conference Men's Soccer Tournament
- 2016 Southern Conference women's soccer season
