= 2019 Southern Conference men's soccer tournament =

- Classification: Division I
- Teams: 7
- Matches: 6
- Attendance: 2,813
- Site: UNCG Soccer Stadium; Greensboro, North Carolina
- Champions: Mercer (4th title)
- Winning coach: Brad Ruzzo (4th title)
- MVP: JR DeRose (Mercer)
- Broadcast: ESPN3

2019 Southern Conference men's soccer standings
	Conf.					Overall
Team	W		L		T	W		L		T
UNCG	5	–	1	–	0	8	–	9	–	1
Furman	5	–	1	–	0	11	–	7	–	1
ETSU	4	–	2	–	0	8	–	8	–	2
Mercer ‡	3	–	3	–	0	14	–	7	–	0
Wofford	2	–	3	–	1	4	–	13	–	1
Belmont	1	–	4	–	1	5	–	12	–	2
VMI	0	–	6	–	0	1	–	16	–	0
‡ – 2019 SoCon Tournament Champion + – Invited to the 2019 NCAA tournament; As of 22 November 2019; Rankings from United Soccer Coaches

The 2019 Southern Conference men's soccer tournament was the 32nd edition of the Southern Conference Men's Soccer Tournament. The tournament decided the Southern Conference champion as well as the conference's automatic berth into the 2019 NCAA Division I men's soccer tournament. The tournament began on November 9 and concluded on November 16, 2019.

Mercer defeated UNCG in the championship match, giving the program their fourth ever SoCon title.

== Seeds ==
Seed	School	Conference	Tiebreaker
1	Furman	5–1–0	1–0 vs. UNCG
2	UNCG	5–1–0	0–1 vs. FUR
3	ETSU	4–2–0	
4	Mercer	3–3–0	
5	Wofford	2–3–1	
6	Belmont	1–4–1	
7	VMI	0–6–0	

== Bracket ==
=== Bracket ===
Wild card
November 5 – 6:00 p.m.
(6) Belmont	4
(7) VMI	0

Quarterfinals
November 8 – 3:30 p.m.
(3) ETSU	0
(6) Belmont	2
November 8 – 1:00 p.m.
(4) Mercer	3
(5) Wofford	0

Semifinals
November 10 – 6:00 p.m.
(2) UNCG (2OT)	3
(6) Belmont	2
November 10 – 1:00 p.m.
(1) Furman	2
(4) Mercer (OT)	3

Final
November 17 – 6:00 p.m.
(2) UNCG	0
(4) Mercer	1

== Results ==
=== First round ===
November 5
6:00 p.m. EDT

No. 6 Belmont	4–0	No. 7 VMI
Dozzi 25'; Barks 51', 59'; Virgilio 84'	Report

E. S. Rose Park, Nashville
Attendance: 217
Referee: Joshua Brooks

=== Quarterfinals ===
November 8
1:00 p.m. EDT

No. 3 ETSU	0–2	No. 6 Belmont
	Report	Shaw 16'; Dagnoni 83'

UNCG Soccer Stadium, Greensboro
Attendance: 102
Referee: Carmen Serbio

November 8
3:30 p.m. EDT

No. 4 Mercer	3–0	No. 5 Wofford
Martineau 11'; Ille 45'; Gaither 48'	Report

Eugene Stone Stadium, Greenville
Attendance: 112
Referee: Robert Sibiga

=== Semifinals ===
November 10
1:00 p.m. EDT

No. 1 Furman	2–3 (a.e.t.)	No. 4 Mercer
Sloan 16'; Fenton 28'	Report	Gaither 3'; Arteaga 34'; Toledo Jr. 105'

Eugene Stone Stadium, Greenville
Attendance: 602
Referee: Patrick Schmidt

November 10
6:00 p.m. EDT

No. 2 UNCG	3–2 (a.e.t.)	No. 6 Belmont
Albert 53'; Pedra 63' 97'	Report	Dozzi 27'; Royster 50'

UNCG Soccer Stadium, Greensboro
Attendance: 1,000
Referee: Brian Miller

=== Final ===
November 17
6:00 p.m. EDT

No. 2 UNCG	0–1	No. 4 Mercer
	Report	Martineau 62'

UNCG Soccer Stadium, Greensboro
Attendance: 780
Referee: Michael Lavergne

== Top goalscorers ==
2 Goals

- (United States) Kyle Barks – Belmont
- (Australia) Jordan Dozzi – Belmont
- (Canada) Trevor Martineau – Mercer
- (Spain) Albert Pedra – UNCG

1 Goal

- (United States) Micah Albert – UNCG
- (United States) Roberto Arteaga – Mercer
- (Italy) Niccolo Dagnoni – Belmont
- (United States) Dylan Gaither – Mercer
- (England) Miles Fenton – Furman
- (United States) Michael Ille – Mercer
- (United States) Brett Royster – Belmont
- (United States) Jack Shaw – Belmont
- (United States) Conor Sloan – Furman
- (United States) Leo Toledo Jr. – Mercer
- (Spain) Pablo Martin Virgilo – Belmont

== SoCon Tournament Best XI ==
Player	Team
**SoCon Men's Soccer All-Tournament team**
Kyle Barks	Belmont
Niccolo Dagnoni	Belmont
Arnor Adalsteinsson	Furman
Max Fisher	Furman
Micah Albert	UNCG
Albert Pedra	UNCG
Casey Penland	UNCG
Roberto Arteaga	Mercer
**JR DeRose**	Mercer
Trevor Martineau	Mercer
Leo Toledo Jr.	Mercer

MVP in Bold
