= 2022 Southern Conference men's soccer tournament =

- Classification: Division I
- Teams: 6
- Matches: 5
- Attendance: 2,695
- Site: Campus Sites (1st and 2nd seed)
- Champions: UNC Greensboro (4th title)
- Winning coach: Chris Rich (2nd title)
- MVP: Ismail El Harchi (UNC Greensboro)
- Broadcast: ESPN+

2022 Southern Conference men's soccer standings
	Conf.					Overall
Team	W		L		T	W		L		T
No. 5 UNC Greensboro‡	4	–	0	–	1	13	–	2	–	6
East Tennessee State	3	–	1	–	1	8	–	6	–	3
Mercer	2	–	1	–	2	8	–	5	–	6
Wofford	2	–	2	–	1	6	–	9	–	2
Furman	1	–	3	–	1	7	–	7	–	4
VMI	0	–	5	–	0	2	–	14	–	1
‡– SoCon Tournament Champion + – At-large invitation to the 2022 NCAA Tournament; As of December 13, 2022; Rankings from United Soccer Coaches; Source: SoCon

The 2022 Southern Conference men's soccer tournament was the postseason men's soccer tournament for the Southern Conference held from November 4 through November 12, 2022. The tournament was held at campus sites, with the higher seed hosting. The seven-team single-elimination tournament consisted of four rounds based on seeding from regular season conference play. The Mercer Bears were the defending champions but were unable to defend their crown, as they lost in the final to the UNC Greensboro Spartans, 2–1. This was the fourth Southern Conference tournament title for the UNC Greensboro men's soccer program, and second under coach Chris Rich. UNC Greensboro also has two tournament titles that were later vacated. As tournament champions, UNC Greensboro earned the Southern Conference's automatic berth into the 2022 NCAA Division I men's soccer tournament.

== Seeding ==
All six Southern Conference men's soccer programs qualified for the 2022 Tournament. Teams were seeded based on their regular season records. Tiebreakers were used to determine the seedings of teams who finished with identical conference records. No tiebreakers were required as all teams finished with unique regular season conference records.

Seed	School	Conference Record	Points
1	UNC Greensboro	4–0–1	13
2	East Tennessee State	3–1–1	10
3	Mercer	2–1–2	8
4	Wofford	2–2–1	7
5	Furman	1–3–1	4
6	VMI	0–5–0	0

== Bracket ==
Quarterfinals; Friday, Nov. 4
4	Wofford	2
5	Furman	3
3	Mercer	2
6	VMI	1

Semifinals; Saturday, Nov. 6
1	UNC Greensboro	6
5	Furman	3
2	East Tennessee State	0
3	Mercer	1

Final; Saturday, Nov. 12
1	UNC Greensboro	2
3	Mercer	1

== Schedule ==
=== Quarterfinals ===
November 4	#3 Mercer	2–1	#6 VMI	Johnson City, TN
3:00 p.m. ET	Michael Ille 17'; Sekou Agard 68'; Tommy Redd (yellow card) 80'; Nick Wanzer (yellow card) 88'	Report	(yellow card) 76', (goal) 82' Grant Martin	Stadium: Summers-Taylor Stadium; Attendance: 50; Referee: Carmen Serbio; Assistant referees: Jude Carr; John Rush; Fourth official: Jeremy Mikell

November 4	#4 Wofford	2–3	#5 Furman	Greensboro, NC
4:00 p.m. ET	Nikolai Rojel 21'; Hugo Moldin 35'; Nathan Childress (yellow card) 86'	Report	3', 12', (yellow card) 84' Jake Raine; (yellow card) 21' Ivan Agyaakwah; 28', (yellow card) 59' Slade Starnes; (yellow card) 86' Tommy Redhead	Stadium: UNCG Soccer Stadium; Attendance: 162; Referee: Guido Gonzales; Assistant referees: Robert Velbis; Bryson Condrey; Fourth official: Nicholas Strednak

=== Semifinals ===
November 6	#1 UNC Greensboro	6–3	#5 Furman	Greensboro, NC
2:00 p.m. ET	Emmanuel Hagan 14'; Marco Afonso 24', 69', 78'; Sami Lachekar (yellow card) 37'; Marc Basile 41' (pen.); Maycol Reyes 55'	Report	(yellow card) 12' Team; (yellow card) 32' Lashawn Brown; 54', 58' Jake Raine; (yellow card) 55', (goal) 75' Slade Starnes; (yellow card) 78' Luke Tandy; (yellow card) 84' Sam Miller	Stadium: UNCG Soccer Stadium; Attendance: 634; Referee: David Erbacher; Assistant referees: Rick Rogers; Hudson Owens; Fourth official: Clive Edwards

November 6	#2 East Tennessee State	0–1	#3 Mercer	Johnson City, TN
3:00 p.m. ET		Report	17' Dylan Gaither; (yellow card) 88' Ousman Jabang	Stadium: Summers-Taylor Stadium; Attendance: 487; Referee: Madzid Coric; Assistant referees: Tarik Veledar; Zach McWorther; Fourth official: Ben Ellis

=== Final ===
November 12	#1 UNC Greensboro	2–1	#3 Mercer	Greensboro, NC
6:00 p.m. ET	Marc Basile 36' (pen.); Ismail El Harchi 83'	Report	27' Kadeem Agard; (yellow card) 44' Angel Gonzalez; (yellow card) 51' Team; (yellow card) 77' Team	Stadium: UNCG Soccer Stadium; Attendance: 1,362; Referee: Sorin Stoica; Assistant referees: Nicholas Seymour; Jeremy Smith; Fourth official: Howard Ash

== Statistics ==
=== Goalscorers ===
There were 21 goals scored in 5 matches, for an average of 4.2 goals per match (as of November 12, 2022).

4 goals

- Jake Raine – Furman

3 goals

- Marco Afonso – UNC Greensboro

2 goals

- Slade Starnes – Furman
- Marc Basile – UNC Greensboro

1 goal

- Kadeem Agard – Mercer
- Sekou Agard – Mercer
- Dylan Gaither – Mercer
- Michael Ille – Mercer
- Ismail El Harchi – UNC Greensboro
- Emmanuel Hagan – UNC Greensboro
- Maycol Reyes – UNC Greensboro
- Grant Martin – VMI
- Hugo Moldin – Wofford
- Nikolai Rojel – Wofford

== All-Tournament team ==
Player	Team
Kieran Richards	East Tennessee State
Sebastian Reventlow-Mourier	East Tennessee State
Alfredo Diaz-Santillan	Furman
Jake Raine	Furman
Dylan Gaither	Mercer
Ousman Jabang	Mercer
Nick Wanzer	Mercer
Marco Afonso	UNC Greensboro
**Ismail El Harchi**	UNC Greensboro
Marc Basile	UNC Greensboro
J.C. Ngando	UNC Greensboro

MVP in bold
