= 2024 Southern Conference men's soccer tournament =

- Classification: Division I
- Teams: 6
- Matches: 5
- Attendance: 2,662
- Site: Campus Sites (1st & 2nd seed)
- Champions: Furman (15th title)
- Winning coach: Doug Allison (10th title)
- MVP: Aaron Salinas (Furman)
- Broadcast: ESPN+

2024 Southern Conference men's soccer standings
	Conf.					Overall
Team	W		L		T	W		L		T
UNCG	3	–	1	–	1	10	–	2	–	5
ETSU	3	–	1	–	1	5	–	7	–	5
Wofford	3	–	2	–	0	8	–	6	–	3
Furman ‡	2	–	1	–	2	9	–	4	–	6
Mercer	1	–	2	–	2	6	–	5	–	7
VMI	0	–	5	–	0	5	–	11	–	2
‡– 2024 SoCon tournament Champion + – At-large invitation to the 2024 NCAA tournament; As of December 17, 2024; Rankings from United Soccer Coaches; Source: SoCon

The 2024 Southern Conference men's soccer tournament was the postseason men's soccer tournament for the Southern Conference held from November 8 through November 17, 2024. The tournament was held at campus sites, with the higher seed hosting. The six-team single-elimination tournament consisted of three rounds based on seeding from regular season conference play. The Mercer Bears were the defending champions. Mercer was unable to defend its title, falling in the First Round to Furman. Furman would go on to win the tournament as the fourth seed, defeating second seed ETSU 2–0 in the Final. This was the fifteenth Southern Conference tournament title for the Furman men's soccer program, and first since 2018. Ten of their fifteen titles have come under head coach Doug Allison. As tournament champions, Furman earned the Southern Conference's automatic berth into the 2024 NCAA Division I men's soccer tournament.

== Seeding ==
All six Southern Conference men's soccer programs participated for the 2024 Tournament. Teams were seeded based on their regular season records. Tiebreakers were used to determine the seedings of teams who finished with identical conference records. A tiebreaker was required to determine the first and second seeds as East Tennessee State and UNC Greensboro both finished with 3–1–1 regular season records. The two teams met on November 2, the final day of the regular season, with the top seed on the line. UNC Greensboro prevailed 3–2, and earned the top seed.

Seed	School	Conference Record	Points
1	UNC Greensboro	3–1–1	10
2	East Tennessee State	3–1–1	10
3	Wofford	3–2–0	9
4	Furman	2–1–2	8
5	Mercer	1–2–2	5
6	VMI	0–5–0	0

== Bracket ==
Quarterfinals; Friday, Nov. 8
4	Furman	2
5	Mercer	0
3	Wofford	3
6	VMI	0

Semifinals; Sunday, Nov. 10
1	UNC Greensboro	1 (5)
4	Furman (pen.)	1 (6)
2	ETSU (pen.)	1 (5)
3	Wofford	1 (3)

Final; Sunday, Nov. 17
4	Furman	2
2	ETSU	0

== Schedule ==
=== Quarterfinals ===
November 8, 2024	#3 Wofford	3–0	#6 VMI	Johnson City, TN
2:00 p.m. EST	Stewart Patnaud 58', 70'; Leo Ledin (yellow card) 70'; Nathan Simes 76'	Report	(yellow card) 43' Anthony Huang; (yellow card) 61' Yeirin Mejia; (yellow card) 76' Drew Menges	Stadium: Summers-Taylor Stadium; Attendance: 172; Referee: Kyle Johnston; Assistant referees: Tarver Pyke; Elon Dockery; Fourth official: Khadime Sabara

November 8, 2024	#4 Furman	2–0	#5 Mercer	Greensboro, NC
7:00 p.m. EST	Wilfer Bustamante 20'; Lloyd Wamu Snell 38'; Trip Campbell (yellow card) 55'	Report	(yellow card) 76' Tommy Redd	Stadium: UNCG Soccer Stadium; Attendance: 215; Referee: Michael Lavergne; Assistant referees: Rick Rogers; Marcus Moss; Fourth official: John Matto

=== Semifinals ===
November 10, 2024	#1 UNC Greensboro	1–1 (a.e.t.) (5–6 p)	#4 Furman	Greensboro, NC
2:00 p.m. EST	Sami Lachekar 26'; Axel Alejandre (yellow card) 44'; Issah Haruna (red card) 82'	Report	(yellow card) 36' Team; (yellow card) 59' Caleb Johnson; (yellow card) 67', (goal) 90' Luke Hutzell; (yellow card) 110' Aaron Salinas	Stadium: UNCG Soccer Stadium; Attendance: 518; Referee: Daniel Radford; Assistant referees: Thomas Rutherford; Richard Wells; Fourth official: Clive Edwards
	Penalties
	Yoshiya Okawa (penalty scored); Steven Hernandez (penalty missed); Basile Marc (penalty scored); Keanan Bader (penalty scored); Arnaud Tattevin (penalty scored); Mikey Ketteman (penalty scored); Maxwel De-Bodene (penalty missed)		(penalty scored) Ivan Agyaakwah; (penalty missed) Christian Kraus; (penalty scored) Wilfer Bustamante; (penalty scored) Slade Starnes; (penalty scored) Diego Hernandez; (penalty scored) Landon Hill; (penalty scored) Ryan Wagner

November 10, 2024	#2 ETSU	1–1 (a.e.t.) (5–3 p)	#3 Wofford	Johnson City, TN
2:00 p.m. EST	Lucas Nordin 40'; Ulysses Hendriks (yellow card) 63'; Louie Salkeld (yellow card) 64'; Gabriel Betancourt (yellow card) 88'; Dave Neijenhuis (yellow card) 88'	Report	87' Hugo Moldin; (yellow card) 88' Kameron Gorst	Stadium: Summers-Taylor Stadium; Attendance: 654; Referee: Michael Lavergne; Assistant referees: Tyler Bost; Daniel Benson; Fourth official: Doug Hartemann
	Penalties
	Dave Nijenhuis (penalty scored); Ryan Suckling (penalty scored); Gabriel Ramos (penalty scored); Louie Salkeld (penalty scored); Ulysses Hendriks (penalty scored)		(penalty scored) Kalle Rahbeck; (penalty scored) Thaddeus Dennis; (penalty scored) Stewart Patnaud; (penalty missed) Nic Parker

=== Final ===
November 17, 2024	#2 ETSU	0–2	#4 Furman	Johnson City, TN
	Louie Salkeld (yellow card) 32'; Gabriel Betancourt (yellow card) 67'	Report	4' Christian Kraus; (yellow card) 27' Lloyd Wamu Snell; (yellow card) 45', (goal) 70' Caleb Johnson; (yellow card) 62' Trip Campbell	Stadium: Summers-Taylor Stadium; Attendance: 1,103; Referee: Matthew Thompson; Assistant referees: John Rush; Joshua Lampkins; Fourth official: Richard Crowgey

== Statistics ==
=== Goalscorers ===
There were 11 goals scored in 5 matches, for an average of 2.2 goals per match (as of November 17, 2024).

2 goals

- Stewart Patnaud – Wofford

1 goal

- Wilfer Bustamante – Furman
- Luke Hutzell – Furman
- Caleb Johnson – Furman
- Christian Kraus – Furman
- Sami Lachekar –UNC Greensboro
- Hugo Moldin – Wofford
- Lucas Nordin – ETSU
- Nathan Simes – Wofford
- Lloyd Wamu Snell – Furman

== All-Tournament team ==
Player	Team
Marc Kouadio	ETSU
Gabriel Ramos	ETSU
Louie Salkeld	ETSU
Christian Kraus	Furman
**Aaron Salinas**	Furman
Slade Starnes	Furman
Lloyd Wamu-Snell	Furman
Axel Alejandre	UNC Greensboro
Sami Lachekar	UNC Greensboro
Paul Jones	Wofford
Hugo Moldin	Wofford

MVP in bold
