= 2021 Southern Conference men's soccer tournament =

- Classification: Division I
- Teams: 7
- Matches: 6
- Attendance: 1,806
- Site: Campus Sites (Higher seed)
- Champions: Mercer (4th title)
- Winning coach: Brad Ruzzo (4th title)
- MVP: Dylan Gaither (Mercer)
- Broadcast: ESPN+

2021 Southern Conference men's soccer standings
	Conf.					Overall
Team	W		L		T	W		L		T
UNC Greensboro	5	–	1	–	0	13	–	4	–	1
Mercer ‡	4	–	1	–	1	10	–	8	–	1
Belmont	4	–	2	–	0	13	–	4	–	1
Furman	4	–	2	–	0	7	–	9	–	1
East Tennessee State	1	–	3	–	2	4	–	7	–	3
Wofford	1	–	4	–	1	5	–	10	–	1
VMI	0	–	6	–	0	1	–	16	–	1
‡– SoCon Tournament Champion + – At-large invitation to the 2021 NCAA tournament; As of December 14, 2021; Rankings from United Soccer Coaches; Source: SoCon

The 2021 Southern Conference men's soccer tournament was the postseason men's soccer tournament for the Southern Conference held from November 1 through November 14, 2021. The tournament was held at campus sites, with the higher seed hosting. The seven-team single-elimination tournament consisted of four rounds based on seeding from regular season conference play. The UNC Greensboro Spartans were the defending champions but were unable to defend their crown, losing 2–1 in the Semifinals to the Belmont Bruins. The Mercer Bears were the tournament champions, defeating Belmont 4–3 in the final. This was the fourth Southern Conference tournament title for the Mercer men's soccer program, all four of which have come under coach Brad Ruzzo. As tournament champions, Mercer earned the Southern Conference's automatic berth into the 2021 NCAA Division I men's soccer tournament.

== Seeding ==
All seven Southern Conference men's soccer programs qualified for the 2021 Tournament. Teams were seeded based on their regular season records. Tiebreakers were used to determine the seedings of teams who finished with identical conference records. Tiebreakers were required to determine the third and fourth seeds as Belmont and Furman finished with identical 4–2–0 records. Furman earned the third seed by virtue of defeating Belmont during the regular season 2–1.

Seed	School	Conference Record	Points
1	UNC Greensboro	5–1–0	15
2	Mercer	4–1–1	13
3	Furman	4–2–0	12
4	Belmont	4–2–0	12
5	East Tennessee State	1–3–2	5
6	Wofford	1–4–1	4
7	VMI	0–6–0	0

== Bracket ==
First Round
6	Wofford	2
7	VMI	0

Quarterfinals
3	Furman	3
6	Wofford	1
4	Belmont	1
5	East Tennessee State	0

Semifinals
2	Mercer	4
3	Furman	0
1	UNC Greensboro	1
4	Belmont	2

Final
2	Mercer	4
4	Belmont	3

== Schedule ==
=== First Round ===
November 1, 2021	#6 Wofford	2–0	#7 VMI	Spartanburg, SC
7:00 p.m. ET	Jackson Worbel 13'; Charlie Harris 88'	Report	(yellow card) 76' Jakub Mihulka; (yellow card) 78' Drew Menges; (yellow card) 84' Nathan Lam	Stadium: Snyder Field; Attendance: 134; Referee: Kyle Johnston; Assistant referees: Khadine Sabara; Tarik Veledar; Fourth official: Joe Kirkpatrick

=== Quarterfinals ===
November 5, 2021	#4 Belmont	1–0	#5 East Tennessee State	Greensboro, NC
6:00 p.m. ET	AJ Chastonay 18', (yellow card) 75'; Niccolo Dagnoni (yellow card) 74'	Report		Stadium: UNCG Soccer Stadium; Attendance: 259; Referee: Brandon Marion; Assistant referees: Khadime Sabara; Robert Velbis; Fourth official: Jude Carr

November 5, 2021	#3 Furman	3–1	#6 Wofford	Macon, GA
7:00 p.m. ET	Miles Fenton 10'; Alfredo Diaz-Santillan 48'; Jake Raine 56'	Report	(red card) 17' Christoffer Saietz; (yellow card) 29' Jackson Wrobel; (yellow card) 36' Hugo Moldin; 80' Nic Parker	Stadium: Betts Stadium; Attendance: 40; Referee: Brian Miller; Assistant referees: Rick Rogers; James McKean; Fourth official: Brandon Adams

=== Semifinals ===
November 7, 2021	#2 Mercer	4–0	#3 Furman	Macon, GA
2:00 p.m. ET	Dylan Gaither 7', 59', 51' (pen.); Kevin Kim (yellow card) 49'; Logan Longo 88'	Report	(yellow card) 62' Arnor Adalsteinsson; (yellow card) 68' Ivan Agyaakwah; (red card) 77' Josh Hosie; (yellow card) 77' Jacob Garzon; (yellow card) 78' Garrett Singletary	Stadium: Betts Stadium; Attendance: 200; Referee: David Erbacher; Assistant referees: Kevin Flynn; Benjamin Ellis; Fourth official: Patrick Lama

November 7, 2021	#1 UNC Greensboro	1–2	#4 Belmont	Greensboro, NC
6:00 p.m. ET	Emmanuel Hagan (yellow card) 84'; Fernando Garcia 86'	Report	(yellow card) 40' Davis Eddleman; 59' Jack Shaw; 72' Liam O'Brien	Stadium: UNCG Soccer Stadium; Attendance: 823; Referee: Dimitar Chavdarov; Assistant referees: Benjamin Wooten; Jeremy Smith; Fourth official: Clive Edwards

=== Final ===
November 14, 2021	#2 Mercer	4–3	#4 Belmont	Macon, GA
2:00 p.m.	Dylan Gaither 39' (pen.), 41'; Michael Ille 71'; Trevor Martineau 88'	Report	20', 21' Liam O'Brien; 80', (yellow card) 83' Esteban Lestido	Stadium: Betts Stadium; Attendance: 350; Referee: Brandon Adams; Assistant referees: Zachary McWhorter; John Rush; Fourth official: Carmen Serbio

== Statistics ==
=== Goalscorers ===
There were 21 goals scored in 6 matches, for an average of 3.5 goals per match.

5 goals

- Dylan Gaither – Mercer

3 goals

- Liam O'Brien – Belmont

1 goal

- AJ Chastonay – Belmont
- Esteban Lestido – Belmont
- Jack Shaw – Belmont
- Alfredo Diaz-Santillan – Furman
- Miles Fenton – Furman
- Jake Raine – Furman
- Michael Ille – Mercer
- Logan Longo – Mercer
- Trevor Martineau – Mercer
- Fernando Garcia – UNC Greensboro
- Charlie Harris – Wofford
- Nic Parker – Wofford
- Jackson Worbel – Wofford

== All-Tournament team ==
Player	Team
Jacob Garzon	Furman
Alfredo Diaz-Santillan	Furman
JC Ngando	UNCG
Fernando Garcia	UNCG
Drew Romig	Belmont
Niccolo Dagnoni	Belmont
Liam O'Brien	Belmont
Ousman Jabang	Mercer
Trevor Martineau	Mercer
Bryant Jackson	Mercer
**Dylan Gaither**	Mercer

MVP in bold
