= 2018 Southern Conference men's soccer tournament =

- Classification: Division I
- Teams: 7
- Matches: 6
- Attendance: 1,860
- Quarterfinals site: Higher seeds
- Semifinals site: Summers-Taylor Stadium; Johnson City, Tennessee
- Finals site: Summers-Taylor Stadium; Johnson City, Tennessee
- Champions: Furman (14th title)
- Winning coach: Doug Allison (9th title)
- MVP: Laurence Wyke (Furman)
- Broadcast: None

2018 Southern Conference men's soccer standings
	Conf.					Overall
Team	W		L		T	W		L		T
Mercer	5	–	1	–	0	12	–	4	–	2
East Tenn. State	4	–	1	–	1	9	–	7	–	1
Furman ‡	4	–	2	–	0	13	–	7	–	2
Wofford	3	–	3	–	0	5	–	11	–	1
UNC Greensboro	2	–	2	–	2	8	–	9	–	2
Belmont	1	–	4	–	1	4	–	12	–	2
VMI	0	–	6	–	0	1	–	16	–	1
‡-2018 SoCon Tournament Champion +-Invited to the 2018 NCAA Division I Men's Soccer Championship; As of November 30, 2018; Rankings from United Soccer Coaches

The 2018 Southern Conference men's soccer tournament, was the 31st edition of the Southern Conference Men's Soccer Tournament. It determined the Southern Conference's automatic berth into the 2018 NCAA Division I Men's Soccer Championship. The tournament began on October 31, 2018 and conclude on November 11, 2018.

The defending champion, Mercer, lost to UNCG 0–1 in the semifinals, who lost to the champions Furman. Furman defeated UNCG 3–0 in the final.

== Seeds ==
Seed	School	Conference	Tiebreaker
1	Mercer	5–1–0	
2	East Tennessee State	4–1–1	
3	Furman	4–2–0	
4	Wofford	3–3–0	
5	UNC Greensboro	2–2–2	
6	Belmont	1–4–1	
7	VMI	0–6–0	

== Bracket ==
Wild card
October 31 – 5:00 p.m.
(6) Belmont	2
(7) VMI	1

Quarterfinals
November 3 – 6:00 p.m.
(3) Furman	4
(6) Belmont	2
November 3 – 7:00 p.m.
(4) Wofford	0
(5) UNCG	1

Semifinals
November 9 – 6:00 p.m.
(2) ETSU	1
(3) Furman (OT)	2
November 9 – 3:30 p.m.
(1) Mercer	0
(5) UNCG	1

Final
November 11 – 1:00 p.m.
(3) Furman	3
(5) UNCG	0

== Results ==
=== First round ===
October 31
5:00 p.m. EDT

No. 6 Belmont	2–1	No. 7 VMI
Marlonsson 31'; Bennati 79'	Report	Shaikh 28'

E. S. Rose Park, Nashville, TN
Attendance: 138
Referee: Leland Grant

=== Quarterfinals ===
November 3
6:00 p.m. EST

No. 3 Furman	4–2	No. 6 Belmont
May 2', 74'; McLagan 28'; Wyke 66'	Report	Lestido 60'; Bennati 84'

Stone Stadium, Greenville, SC
Attendance: 376
Referee: Brandon Marion

November 3
7:00 p.m. EST

No. 4 Wofford	0–1	No. 5 UNCG
	Report	Apau 88'

Snyder Field, Spartanburg, SC
Attendance: 638
Referee: Dimitar Chavdarov

=== Semifinals ===
November 9
3:30 p.m. EST

No. 1 Mercer	0–1	No. 5 UNCG
	Report	Henderson 26'

Summers-Taylor Stadium, Johnson City, TN
Attendance: 104
Referee: Marco Vega

November 9
6:00 p.m. EST

No. 2 ETSU	1–2 (a.e.t.)	No. 3 Furman
Woodfin 55'	Report	Fenton 47'; Wyke 98'

Summers-Taylor Stadium, Johnson City, TN
Attendance: 378
Referee: Brian Miller

=== Final ===
November 11
1:00 p.m. EST

No. 3 Furman	3–0	No. 5 UNCG
May 20', 29'; Sloan 86'	Report

Summers-Taylor Stadium, Johnson City, TN
Attendance: 226
Referee: Guido Gonzales

== Statistics ==
=== Goals ===
Rank	Player	College	Goals
1	(United States) Emery May	Furman	4
2	(Italy) Matteo Bennati	Belmont	2
3	(Italy) Manny Apau	UNCG	1
3	(Argentina) Esteban Lestido	Belmont	1
3	(United States) Ares Marlonsson	Belmont	1
3	(United States) Cole McLagan	Furman	1
3	(United States) Sohrab Shaikh	VMI	1
3	(United States) Conor Sloan	Furman	1
3	(England) Laurence Wyke	Furman	1

=== Assists ===
Rank	Player	College	Assists
1	(Italy) Niccolo Dagnoni	Belmont	2
1	(United States) Danny Kierath	Furman	2
1	(United States) Cole McLagan	Furman	2
2	(United States) Jack Shiels	Furman	1
2	(China) Nigel Leo	Belmont	1
2	(United States) Tony Doellefeld	Belmont	1
2	(United States) Jack Shiels	Furman	1
2	(United States) Conor Sloan	Furman	1
2	(Israel) Daniel Twizer	Belmont	1
2	(United States) Laurence Wyke	Furman	1

== All Tournament Team ==
**2018 SoCon Men’s Soccer All-Tournament team**
- Jake Mezei, Mercer
- Kobe Perez, Mercer
- Nick Spielman, ETSU
- Cameron Woodfin, ETSU
- Josh Masten, UNCG
- Alex Henderson, UNCG
- Austin Matthews, UNCG
- Jack Shiels, Furman
- Cameron Robinson, Furman
- Rocky Guerra, Furman
- **Laurence Wyke, Furman**
MVP in Bold
