= 2016 Southern Conference men's soccer tournament =

- Classification: Division I
- Teams: 6
- Matches: 5
- Site: UNCG Soccer Stadium; Greensboro, North Carolina
- Champions: Mercer Bears (1st title)
- Winning coach: Brad Ruzzo (1st title)
- Broadcast: SoCon Digital Network, ESPN3

2016 Southern Conference men's soccer standings
	Conf.					Overall
Team	W		L		T	W		L		T
East Tenn. State+	7	–	1	–	3	12	–	5	–	3
Mercer ‡	7	–	3	–	1	13	–	7	–	1
Wofford	6	–	4	–	0	12	–	7	–	0
UNC Greensboro	6	–	4	–	0	11	–	7	–	2
Furman	2	–	6	–	2	6	–	9	–	3
VMI	0	–	10	–	0	0	–	17	–	0
‡-2016 SoCon Tournament Champion +-Invited to the 2016 NCAA Division I Men's Soccer Championship; As of 18 November 2016; Rankings from NSCAA

The 2016 Southern Conference men's soccer tournament, was the 11th edition of the tournament. It determined the Southern Conference's automatic berth into the 2016 NCAA Division I Men's Soccer Championship.

The Mercer Bears won the SoCon title, besting the East Tennessee State Buccaneers, 4–1 in penalty kicks following a scoreless match. It was Mercer's first SoCon title.

The tournament was hosted by the University of North Carolina Greensboro and all matches were contested at UNCG Soccer Stadium.

== Seeding ==
Seed	School	Conference	Tiebreaker
1	East Tennessee State	7–1–3	
2	Mercer	7–3–1	
3	Wofford	6–4	1–1 vs. UNCG
4	UNC Greensboro	6–4	1–1 vs. WOF
5	Furman	2–6–2	
6	VMI	0–10	

== Bracket ==
Quarterfinals; Nov. 5
4	UNCG	1
5	Furman	0
3	Wofford	3
6	VMI	1

Semifinals; Nov. 10
1	ETSU	5
4	UNCG	2
2	Mercer	2
3	Wofford	0

Final; Nov. 12
1	ETSU	0 (1)
2	Mercer (pen.)	0 (4)

== See also ==
- 2016 Southern Conference men's soccer season
- 2016 NCAA Division I men's soccer season
- 2016 NCAA Division I Men's Soccer Championship
- Southern Conference Men's Soccer Tournament
