= 2023 Southern Conference men's soccer tournament =

- Classification: Division I
- Teams: 6
- Matches: 5
- Attendance: 3,841
- Site: Campus Sites (1st & 2nd seed)
- Champions: Mercer (5th title)
- Winning coach: Brad Ruzzo (5th title)
- MVP: Sekou Agard (Mercer)
- Broadcast: ESPN+

2023 Southern Conference men's soccer standings
	Conf.					Overall
Team	W		L		T	W		L		T
ETSU	4	–	0	–	1	9	–	5	–	3
Wofford	3	–	0	–	2	7	–	4	–	6
Furman	2	–	2	–	1	10	–	6	–	3
Mercer ‡	1	–	2	–	2	7	–	6	–	8
UNC Greensboro	1	–	2	–	2	2	–	10	–	5
VMI	0	–	5	–	0	5	–	14	–	0
‡– 2023 SoCon tournament Champion + – At-large invitation to the 2023 NCAA tournament; As of December 12, 2023; Rankings from United Soccer Coaches; Source: SoCon

The 2023 Southern Conference men's soccer tournament was the postseason men's soccer tournament for the Southern Conference held from November 3 through November 12, 2023. The tournament was held at campus sites, with the higher seed hosting. The six-team single-elimination tournament consisted of three rounds based on seeding from regular season conference play. The UNC Greensboro Spartans were the defending champions. UNC Greensboro was unable to defend its title, falling in the Quarterfinals to Mercer. Mercer would go on to win the tournament as the fifth seed, defeating Furman 2–0 in the Final. This was the fifth Southern Conference tournament title for the Mercer men's soccer program, all of which have come under head coach Brad Ruzzo. Mercer has also won the tournament three of the last five years. As tournament champions, Mercer earned the Southern Conference's automatic berth into the 2023 NCAA Division I men's soccer tournament.

== Seeding ==
All six Southern Conference men's soccer programs qualified for the 2023 Tournament. Teams were seeded based on their regular season records. Tiebreakers were used to determine the seedings of teams who finished with identical conference records. A tiebreaker was required to determine the fourth and fifth seeds as Mercer and defending champions UNC Greensboro both finished the regular season with 1–2–2 records. The two teams tied their October 21 match 1–1. UNC Greensboro was the fourth seed and Mercer was the fifth seed.

Seed	School	Conference Record	Points
1	ETSU	4–0–1	13
2	Wofford	3–0–2	11
3	Furman	2–2–1	7
4	UNC Greensboro	1–2–2	5
5	Mercer	1–2–2	5
6	VMI	0–5–0	0

== Bracket ==
Quarterfinals; Friday, Nov. 3
4	UNC Greensboro	1
5	Mercer	3
3	Furman	4
6	VMI	1

Semifinals; Sunday, Nov. 5
1	ETSU	1 (3)
5	Mercer (pen.)	1 (4)
2	Wofford	0
3	Furman	1

Final; Sunday, Nov. 12
5	Mercer	2
3	Furman	0

== Schedule ==
=== Quarterfinals ===
November 3	#4 UNC Greensboro	1–3	#5 Mercer	Johnson City, TN
3:00 p.m. ET	Arnaud Tattevin 41'	Report	30' Nick Wanzer; 62' Barzee Blama; 65' Ehi Aimiuwu; (yellow card) 75' Carlos Santamaria	Stadium: Summers-Taylor Stadium; Attendance: 506; Referee: Richard Crowgey; Assistant referees: Zachary McWhorter; Gunwan Park; Fourth official: Kevin Uitto

November 3	#3 Furman	4–1	#6 VMI	Spartanburg, SC
4:00 p.m. ET	Christian Kraus 24', 48', 57'; Slade Starnes 45'; Lloyd Wamu Snell (yellow card) 70'	Report	66' Malcolm McIntosh	Stadium: Snyder Field; Attendance: 70; Referee: Brandon Marion; Assistant referees: Kevin Maurer; Thomas Rutherford; Fourth official: Khadime Sabara

=== Semifinals ===
November 5	#2 Wofford	0–1	#3 Furman	Spartanburg, SC
2:00 p.m. ET	Villads Landsperg (yellow card) 46'; Hugo Moldin (yellow card) 73'	Report	(yellow card) 28' Slade Starnes; 80' Alfredo Diaz-Santillan	Stadium: Snyder Field; Attendance: 347; Referee: Matthew Thompson; Assistant referees: Joshua Lampkins; John Rush; Fourth official: Derek Ambrozaitis

November 5	#1 ETSU	1–1 (a.e.t.) (3–4 p)	#5 Mercer	Johnson City, TN
3:00 p.m. ET	Lucas Lightner 30'; Nico Kross (yellow card) 83'	Report	(yellow card) 43' Dylan Gaither; (yellow card) 60' Nick Wanzer; 80' Sekou Agard; (yellow card) 106' Team	Stadium: Summers-Taylor Stadium; Attendance: 1,092; Referee: Brandon Marion; Assistant referees: Ryan Starr; Raymond Thomas; Fourth official: Zachary McWhorter
	Penalties
	Gabriel Ramos (penalty missed); Tarik Pannholzer (penalty scored); David Kovacic (penalty scored); Zayd Idlibi (penalty missed); Chris McKenna (penalty scored); Izzy Garcia (penalty missed)		(penalty scored) Omar Hernandez; (penalty scored) Carlos Santamaria; (penalty scored) Dylan Gaither; (penalty missed) Natnael McDonald; (penalty missed) Angel Gonzalez; (penalty scored) Grant Hampton

=== Final ===
November 12	#3 Furman	0–2	#5 Mercer	Greenville, SC
2:00 p.m. ET	Luke Tandy (yellow card) 83'	Report	2' Nick Wanzer; 6' Carlos Santamaria; (yellow card) 44' Kadeem Agard; (yellow card) 68' Rayvon McGann; (yellow card) 78' Trevor McMullen	Stadium: Stone Stadium; Attendance: 1,826; Referee: William Steffen; Assistant referees: Rick Rogers; Thomas Brigman; Fourth official: Khadime Sabara

== Statistics ==
=== Goalscorers ===
There were 14 goals scored in 5 matches, for an average of 2.8 goals per match (as of November 12, 2023).

3 goals

- Christian Kraus – Furman

2 goals

- Nick Wanzer – Mercer

1 goal

- Lucas Lightner – East Tennessee State
- Alfredo Diaz-Santillan – Furman
- Slade Starnes – Furman
- Sekou Agard – Mercer
- Ehi Aimiuwu – Mercer
- Barzee Blama – Mercer
- Carlos Santamaria – Mercer
- Malcolm McIntosh – VMI
- Arnaud Tattevin – UNC Greensboro

== All-Tournament team ==
Player	Team
Cole Hunter	ETSU
Lucas Lightner	ETSU
Josh Hosie	Furman
Christian Kraus	Furman
Slade Starnes	Furman
**Sekou Agard**	Mercer
Barzee Blama
Trevor McMullen
Nick Wanzer
Hugo Moldin	Wofford
Nic Parker	Wofford

MVP in bold
