= 2017 Southern Conference men's soccer tournament =

- Classification: Division I
- Teams: 6
- Matches: 5
- Site: Stone Stadium; Greenville, South Carolina
- Champions: Mercer (2nd title)
- Broadcast: SoCon Digital Network, ESPN3

2017 Southern Conference men's soccer standings
	Conf.					Overall
Team	W		L		T	W		L		T
East Tenn. State	6	–	0	–	4	9	–	2	–	7
UNC Greensboro	6	–	3	–	1	10	–	7	–	3
Furman	5	–	2	–	3	12	–	5	–	3
Mercer ‡	4	–	4	–	2	7	–	9	–	6
Wofford	4	–	6	–	0	4	–	15	–	0
VMI	0	–	10	–	0	0	–	16	–	2
‡-2017 SoCon Tournament Champion +-Invited to the 2017 NCAA Division I Men's Soccer Championship; As of November 17, 2017; Rankings from United Soccer Coaches

The 2017 Southern Conference men's soccer tournament, was the 12th edition of the tournament. It determined the Southern Conference's automatic berth into the 2017 NCAA Division I Men's Soccer Championship.

Defending champions, Mercer, successfully defended their title, beating UNC Greensboro in the final.

== Seeding ==
All six teams in the SoCon qualified for the tournament. The teams were seeded based on their regular season conference record.

Seed	Team	W	L	T	Pct	Pts
1	ETSU	6	0	4	.800	22
2	UNCG	6	3	1	.650	19
3	Furman	5	2	3	.650	18
4	Mercer	4	4	2	.500	14
5	Wofford	4	6	0	.400	12
6	VMI	0	10	0	.000	0

== Bracket ==
Quarterfinals; Nov. 5
4	Mercer	2
5	Wofford	1
3	Furman	7
6	VMI	1

Semifinals; Nov. 10
1	ETSU	0 (3)
4	Mercer (pen.)	0 (4)
2	UNCG	3
3	Furman	2

Final; Nov. 12
4	Mercer (pen.)	1 (3)
2	UNCG	1 (2)

== See also ==
- 2017 Southern Conference men's soccer season
- 2017 NCAA Division I men's soccer season
- 2017 NCAA Division I Men's Soccer Championship
- Southern Conference Men's Soccer Tournament
- 2017 Southern Conference Women's Soccer Tournament
