= 2020 Southern Conference men's soccer tournament =

- Classification: Division I
- Teams: 4
- Matches: 3
- Attendance: 885
- Site: Eugene E. Stone III Stadium, UNCG Soccer Stadium; Greenville, South Carolina, Greensboro, North Carolina
- Champions: UNC Greensboro

The 2020 Southern Conference men's soccer tournament was the 33rd edition of the Southern Conference Men's Soccer Tournament. The tournament determined the Southern Conference champion as well as the conference's automatic berth into the 2020 NCAA Division I men's soccer tournament.

== Effects of the Covie-19 pandemic ==
The tournament was originally set to be played in November 2020, however, the Southern Conference postponed all fall sports with the hope to play in the spring.

== Format ==
Contrary to previous tournaments, the 2020 edition was only contested by the top four teams in the conference.

== Qualified teams ==
| Seed | Team | Conference record |
|---|---|---|
| 1 | Furman | 5-0-1 |
| 2 | UNC Greensboro | 3-1-2 |
| 3 | East Tennessee State | 3-1-2 |
| 4 | Belmont | 3-2-1 |

== Bracket ==
Semifinals
1 | Furman | 1
4 | Belmont | 3
3 | East Tennessee State | 1
2 | UNC Greensboro | 2

Finals
4 | Belmont | 0
2 | UNC Greensboro | 1

== Matches ==
=== Semifinals ===
April 9
6:00 p.m. ET

| Furman | 1–3 | Belmont |
|---|---|---|
| Jake Raine 62' | Report | Liam O'Brien 10'; AJ Chastonay 79'; Michael Saunders 90' |

Stone III Stadium
Attendance: 320
April 10
6:00 p.m. ET

| UNC Greensboro | 2–1 | East Tennessee State |
|---|---|---|
| Theo Collomb 37'; Angel Bacho 61' | Report | Jared Leheta 71' |

UNCG Soccer Stadium
Attendance: 217

=== Final ===
April 17
6:00 p.m. ET

| UNC Greensboro | 1–0 | Belmont |
|---|---|---|
| Mani Austmann 80' | Report |

UNCG Soccer Stadium
Attendance: 348
