= 1881–82 Washington and Lee Generals men's soccer team =

American college soccer season

1881–82 Washington and Lee Generals men's soccer

National champions (ASHA/IFRA)
- Conference: Independent
- Record: 1–0–0
- Head coach: Unknown

1881–82 college soccer records
| | Conf. | | | Overall |
| Team | W | L | T | W | | L | | T |
|---|---|---|---|---|---|---|---|---|
| Richmond | | – | | 2 | – | 0 | – | 0 |
| Washington & Lee | | – | | 1 | – | 0 | – | 0 |
| Cornell | | – | | 0 | – | 1 | – | 0 |
| VMI | | – | | 0 | – | 1 | – | 0 |
| Randolph–Macon | | – | | 0 | – | 2 | – | 0 |

The 1881–82 Washington and Lee Generals men's soccer team represented Washington and Lee University during the 1881–82 college soccer season. The Washington and Lee team played one match, where they defeated VMI, 12-1 in their only match of the season. The team was retroactively determined the national champion that year by the American Soccer History Archives and the Intercollegiate Soccer Football Association, for having the best goal differential amongst teams that were undefeated during the 1881-82 academic year.

== Schedule ==
| Date Time, TV | Rank^{#} | Opponent^{#} | Result | Record | Site (Attendance) City, State |
Regular season
| 1882* | | at VMI | W 12–1 | | VMI Soccer Field; Lexington, VA |
