= Chris Goos =

American soccer player

Personal information
- Full name: Christopher Goos
- Date of birth: April 16, 1981 (age 45)
- Place of birth: Houston, Texas, U.S.
- Height: 5 ft 9 in (1.75 m)
- Position: Midfielder

College career
Years	Team	Apps	(Gls)
1999–2002	UNC Greensboro Spartans		

Senior career*
Years	Team	Apps	(Gls)
2003–2005	Charleston Battery	58	(8)
2003	→ Carolina Dynamo (loan)	1	(1)
- * Club domestic league appearances and goals

Christopher Goos is an American retired soccer midfielder who played professionally in the USL First Division.

Goos graduated from Klein High School. His sophomore season, he scored two goals in Klein's victory over Grapevine High School in the Texas high school soccer championship. In his senior season at Klein HS Chris was an All-American and led his school to another state title defeating Kingwood HS in the finals. That completed a 27-0-1 season record and a national #1 ranking for Klein HS. He attended UNC Greensboro, playing on the men's soccer team from 1999 to 2002. In 2002, his senior season, Goos led the nation in scoring with 20 goals and 20 assists. This led to his selection as a 2002 NCAA Division I Second Team All American.

In 2003, the Atlanta Silverbacks selected Goos in the USL Draft, but did not sign him. Instead, he signed with the Charleston Battery. On April 25, 2003, Goos went on loan to the Carolina Dynamo of the USL Premier Development League in a 2–1 victory over the Long Island Rough Riders. Goos retired after the 2005 season.
