= Jim Clark (Scottish footballer) =

Scottish footballer

Personal information
- Full name: James Donald Clark
- Date of birth: 1 May 1923
- Place of birth: Dornoch, Scotland
- Date of death: February 1994 (aged 70)
- Place of death: Forest of Dean, Gloucestershire, England
- Position: Full back

Youth career
- Aberdeen

Senior career*
Years	Team	Apps	(Gls)
1948–1953	Exeter City	95	(5)
1952	→ Bradford City (loan)	6	(0)
- Gloucester City
Total		101	(5)
- * Club domestic league appearances and goals

James Donald Clark (1 May 1923 – February 1994) was a Scottish professional footballer who played as a full back.

== Career ==
Born in Dornoch, Clark played for Aberdeen, Exeter City, Bradford City and Gloucester City.

He played for Bradford City between September 1952 and October 1952, making 6 appearances in the Football League.

== Sources ==
- Frost, Terry (1988). Bradford City A Complete Record 1903–1988. Breedon Books Sport. ISBN 0-907969-38-0.
