= Patchin Field =

Coordinates: 37.791610°N 79.440483°W

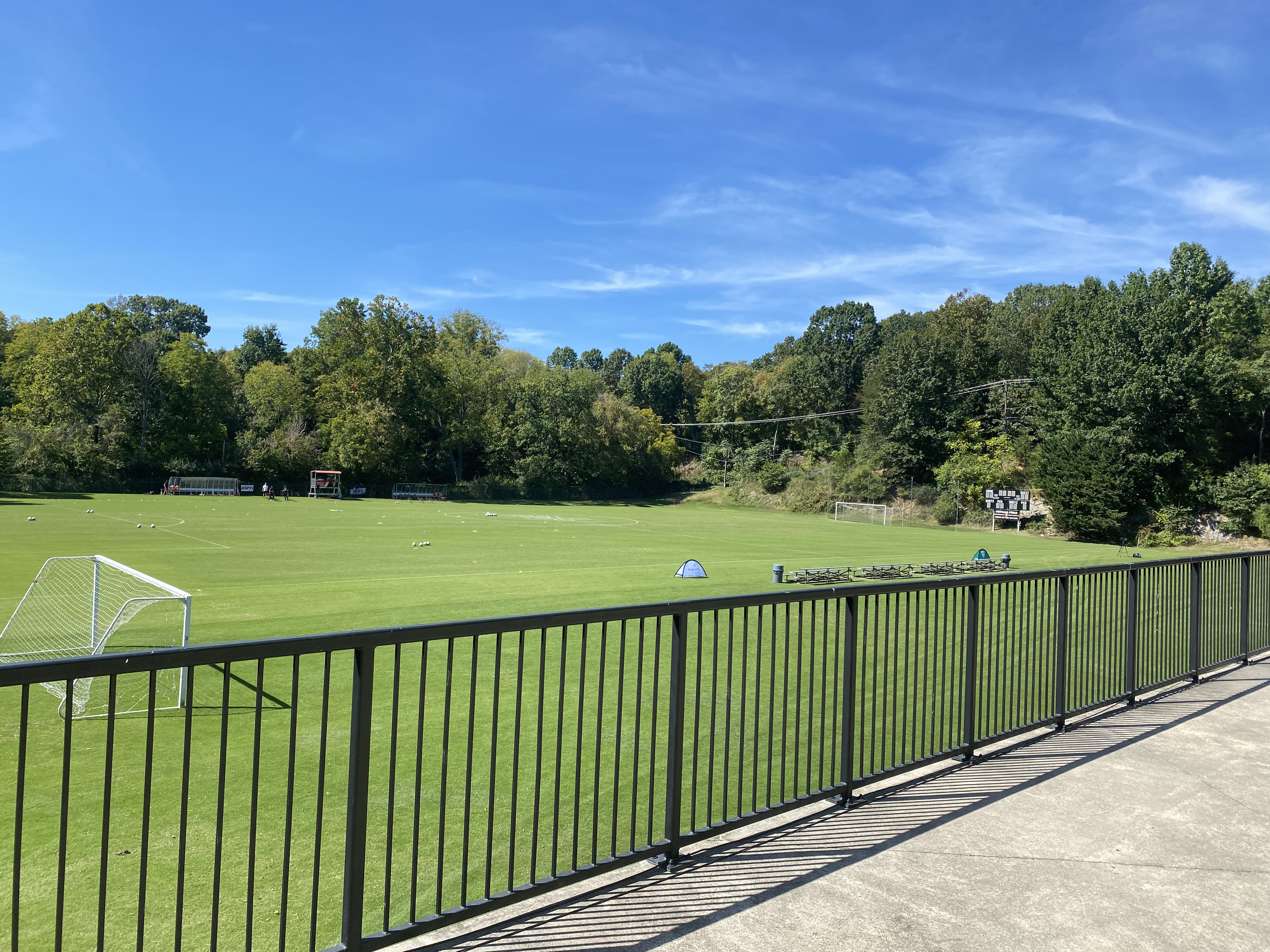
- Interactive map of Patchin Field
- Location: Lexington, Virginia
- Surface: Grass

Tenants
- VMI Men's Soccer VMI Women's Soccer VMI Lacrosse(practice)

Patchin Field is a 1,000 seat facility that is home to the Virginia Military Institute (VMI) Keydets men's and women's soccer teams, along with being the practice facility for the VMI lacrosse team. Patchin Field is built over top of Woods Creek, along with VMI's baseball facility, Gray–Minor Stadium. Paulette Hall contains locker rooms for VMI baseball, lacrosse, and men's and women's soccer. Patchin Field is named after Herb Patchin, an athletic trainer at VMI for thirty-four years.

== Features ==
Patchin Field, aside from locker rooms, which contain audio and visual equipment, whirlpools, and a taping bench, contains an electronic scoreboard and aluminum bench seating on the sidelines of the field, which is made of natural grass. It is located north of Institute Hill.
