= Dylan Gaither =

American soccer player

Personal information
- Date of birth: August 13, 2000 (age 26)
- Place of birth: Augusta, Georgia, United States
- Height: 1.77 m (5 ft 10 in)
- Position: Midfielder

Youth career
- 2016–2019: Atlanta United

College career
Years	Team	Apps	(Gls)
2019–	Mercer Bears	81	(30)

Senior career*
Years	Team	Apps	(Gls)
2018	Atlanta United 2	4	(1)
- * Club domestic league appearances and goals as of 16:09, 8 July 2024 (UTC)

Dylan Gaither (born August 13, 2000) is an American college soccer player who plays for the Mercer Bears in the NCAA Division I.

== Career ==
Gaither played with Atlanta United FC academy whilst also appearing for Atlanta's United Soccer League affiliate Atlanta United 2 during their inaugural season in 2018.
