= Summers-Taylor Stadium =

Soccer stadium in Johnson City, Tennessee

Coordinates: 36.2986°N 82.3774°W

- Interactive map of Summers-Taylor Stadium
- Address: Johnson City, TN; United States
- Owner: East Tennessee State University
- Operator: ETSU Athletics
- Type: Soccer-specific stadium

Construction
- Opened: 2008; 18 years ago

Tenants
- ETSU Buccaneers (NCAA) teams: men's and women's soccer

Website
- etsubucs.com/summers-taylor-stadium

Summers-Taylor Stadium is a college soccer-specific stadium located on the campus of East Tennessee State University in Johnson City, Tennessee, in the United States. The stadium is home to the East Tennessee State Buccaneers men's and women's soccer programs.

The stadium opened in 2008 and sits 2,000 spectators.

The stadium hosted a semifinal match in the 2020 Southern Conference Men's Soccer Tournament.
