= Wofford Terriers men's soccer =

American college soccer team

- 2022 Wofford Terriers men's soccer team
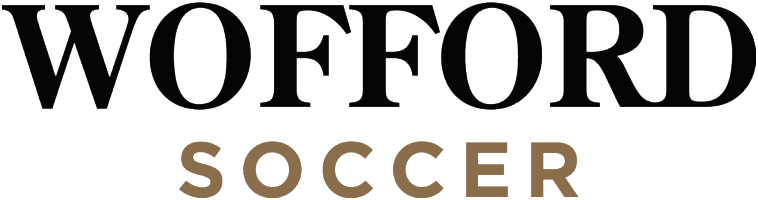
- Founded: 1975; 51 years ago
- University: Wofford College
- Head coach: Joel Tyson (1st season)
- Conference: SoCon
- Location: Spartanburg, South Carolina, US
- Stadium: Snyder Field (capacity: 2,250)
- Nickname: Terriers
- Colors: Old gold and black
Home	Away

NCAA tournament appearances
- 2009

Conference tournament championships
- 2009

Conference Regular Season championships
- 2009, 2013

The Wofford Terriers men's soccer team represents Wofford College in all NCAA Division I men's college soccer competitions. The Terriers play in the Southern Conference.

== Rivalries ==
Wofford's primary rivals are Furman, Presbyterian, and UNC Greensboro.

=== Record against SoCon opponents ===
Opponent	Record
Belmont	4–4–0
East Tennessee State	3–7–2
Furman	15–33–0
Mercer	2–11–1
UNCG	6–23–1
VMI	14–4–1

== Postseason ==
=== NAIA Tournament results ===
Wofford has appeared in six NAIA Tournaments. Their record is 4–8–0.

Year	Round	Opponent	Score
1977	First	College of Charleston	2–5
1978	First	Winthrop	3–2
1978	Second	Erskine	1–2
1979	First	Erskine	3–4
1982	First; Second	College of Charleston; Erskine	1–0; 0–6
1984	First	Erskine	1–6
1985	First; Second	Francis Marion; Erskine	1–0; 1–5
1986	First; Second	Presbyterian; USC Upstate	2–1; 0–5
1987	First	College of Charleston	3–4

=== NCAA tournament results ===
Wofford has appeared in one NCAA Tournament. Their record is 0–1–0.

Year	Round	Opponent	Result
2009	First round	UC Santa Barbara	L 0–1
