= Mercer Bears men's soccer =

American college soccer team

- 2022 Mercer Bears men's soccer team
- Founded: 1970; 56 years ago
- University: Mercer University
- Head coach: Brad Ruzzo (17th season)
- Conference: SoCon
- Location: Macon, Georgia, US
- Stadium: Betts Stadium (capacity: 300)
- Nickname: Bears
- Colors: Black and orange
Home	Away

NCAA tournament appearances
- 2001, 2016, 2017, 2018, 2019, 2021

Conference tournament championships
- 1999, 2001, 2016, 2017, 2019, 2021, 2023

Conference regular season championships
- 1992, 2000, 2001, 2002, 2014, 2018

The Mercer Bears men's soccer team represents Mercer University in all NCAA Division I men's college soccer competitions. The Bears play in the Southern Conference.

== Coaching staff ==
As of March 17, 2019.

Name	Position coached	Consecutive season at Mercer University in current position
Brad Ruzzo	Head coach	12th
Jarred Brookins	Assistant coach	2nd
Alex Gott	Assistant coach	2nd

== Championships ==
=== Conference regular season championships ===
Mercer has won six regular season championships.

Year	Coach	Overall Record	Conference Record
1992	Dana Robinson	9–6–2	5–0–0
2000	Tom Melville	9–8–2	3–1–2
2001	Tom Melville	13–8–0	5–2–0
2002	Tom Melville	10–7–1	6–1–1
2014	Brad Ruzzo	14–7–0	8–2–0
2018	Brad Ruzzo	12–4–2	5–1–0
Conference regular season championships			6

=== Conference tournament championships ===
Mercer has won five conference tournaments. Two Atlantic Sun Men's Soccer Tournaments and three Southern Conference Men's Soccer Tournaments.

Year	Conference	Coach	Opponent	Score	Site	Overall Record	Conf. Record
1999	Atlantic Sun	Tom Melville	Florida Atlantic	2–0	Jacksonville, FL	12–7–2	4–2–0
2001	Atlantic Sun	Tom Melville	Jacksonville	2–1	Macon, GA	13–8–0	5–2–0
2016	Southern	Brad Ruzzo	East Tennessee State	0–0 (Note: Won in penalty kicks.)	Greensboro, NC	13–7–1	7–3–0
2017	Southern	Brad Ruzzo	UNCG	1–1 (Note: Won in penalty kicks.)	Greenville, SC	7–9–6	4–4–2
2019	Southern	Brad Ruzzo	UNCG	1–0	Greensboro, NC	14–7–0	3–3–0
2021	Southern	Brad Ruzzo	Belmont	4–3	Macon, GA	10–8–1	4–1–1
2023	Southern	Brad Ruzzo	Furman	2–0	Greenville, SC	7–6–8	1–2–2
Conference tournament championships							7

== Postseason ==
=== NCAA tournament results ===
Mercer has appeared in four NCAA Tournaments. Their combined record is 0–4–0.

Year	Round	Opponent	Result
2001	First round	Kentucky	L 0–1
2016	First round	South Carolina	L 0–1
2017	First round	Coastal Carolina	L 0–1
2019	First round	Charlotte	L 1–3
2021	First round	Wake Forest	L 1–2
2023	First round	FIU	L 0–1
