= UNCG Soccer Stadium =

Stadium in Greensboro, North Carolina

Coordinates: 36.070309°N 79.812895°W

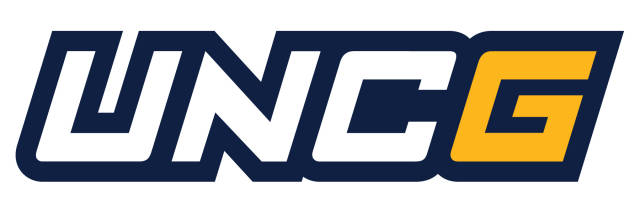

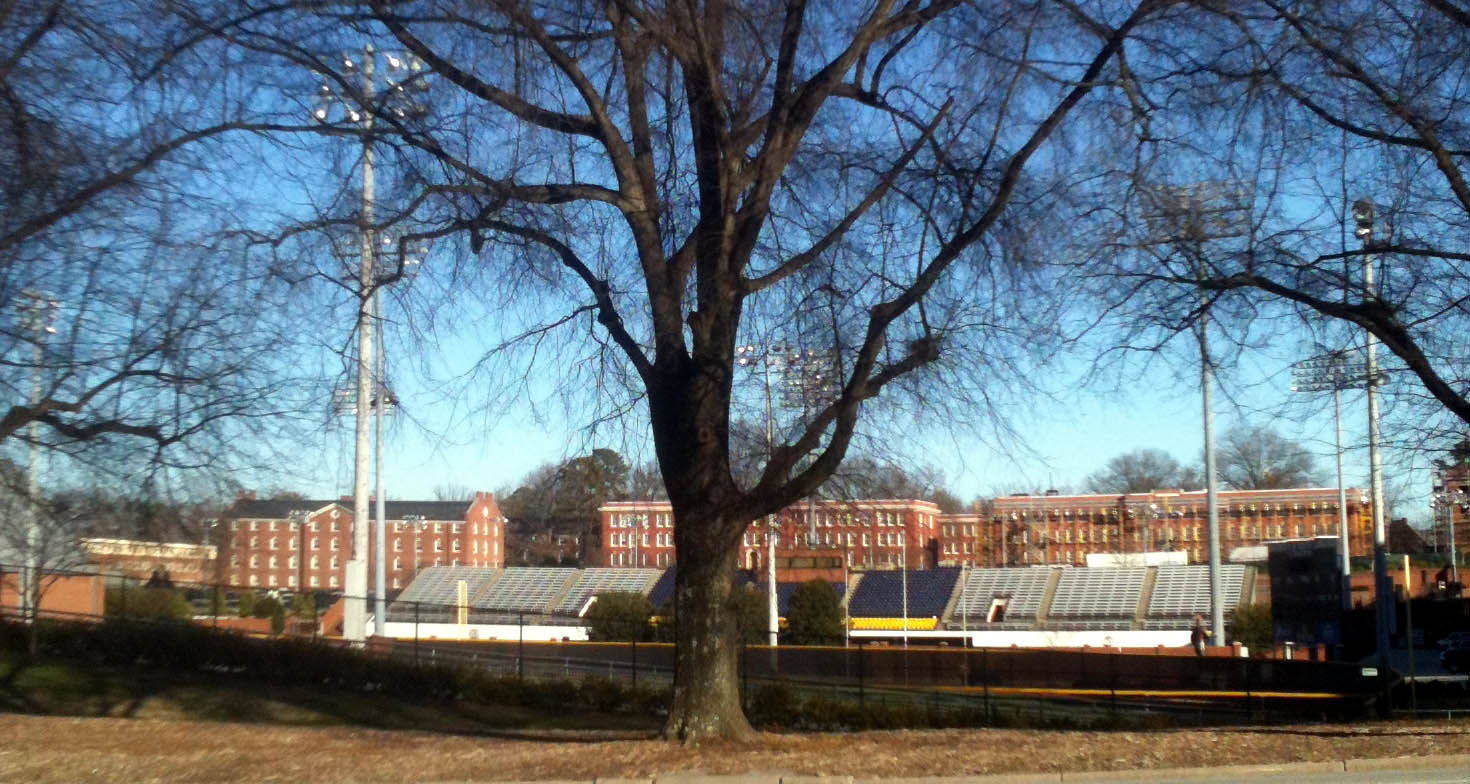
- Exterior view of the venue in 2012
- Interactive map of UNCG Soccer Stadium
- Address: Greensboro, NC; United States
- Owner: UNC Greensboro
- Operator: UNC Grensboro Athletics
- Capacity: 3,540 (expandable)
- Type: Soccer-specific stadium
- Surface: Grass

Construction
- Opened: 1991; 35 years ago
- Cost: $3.6 million

Tenants
- UNCG Spartans (NCAA) teams: men's and women's soccer

Website
- uncgspartans.com/uncg-soccer-stadium

The UNCG Soccer Stadium is a 3,540-capacity soccer-specific stadium located on the campus of University of North Carolina (UNCG) in Greensboro, North Carolina.

The stadium was opened for the practise of soccer in 1991 and is home to the UNC Greensboro Spartans men's and women's soccer teams.

== Events ==
The stadium has hosted the NCAA Division I women's and Division III men's tournament finals. For the women's championship games, extra bleachers were brought in to expand the capacity to 10,583 people.

The UNCG Soccer Stadium hosted the final of the 2020 Southern Conference men's soccer tournament, where the Spartans defeated Belmont to win their 6th. championship.

The stadium was one of the hosts for the 2020 NCAA Division I men's soccer tournament and the 2020 NCAA Division I women's soccer tournament.

In 2022, the stadium hosted the second round and quarterfinal games of the NCAA men's soccer tournament, both of which the UNCG men's soccer team played in. UNCG lost to Indiana in the quarterfinal game in front of a record setting crowd of 3,622.

Preceded by Buck Shaw Stadium	Host of the Women's College Cup; 1997–1998	Succeeded by Spartan Stadium
