= Belmont Bruins men's soccer =

American college soccer team

- Founded: 1991; 35 years ago
- University: Belmont University
- Head coach: David Costa (1st season)
- Conference: MVC
- Location: Nashville, Tennessee, US
- Stadium: E. S. Rose Park (capacity: 300)
- Nickname: Bruins
- Colors: Navy, white, and red
Home	Away

The Belmont Bruins men's soccer team represents Belmont University in NCAA Division I soccer. The Bruins currently play in the Missouri Valley Conference (MVC). From 2018 to 2021 the Bruins played in the Southern Conference (SoCon), and prior to that played in the Horizon League. The Bruins play their home matches at the soccer stadium in the sports complex located at the city of Nashville's E. S. Rose Park. A former Division II All-American and long-time collegiate assistant coach, Bryan Green has been the Bruins' head coach since 2014.

== Roster ==
As of Jul 2026

Note: Flags indicate national team as defined under FIFA eligibility rules; some limited exceptions apply. Players may hold more than one non-FIFA nationality.

No.	Pos.	Nation	Player
0	GK	USA	Brody Sucher
1	GK	USA	Miles Kipley
2	DF	USA	Palmer Hendrix
3	DF	USA	Zach Stanton
4	DF	USA	Judah McCloud
5	DF	USA	Nate Mefford
7	MF	DEN	Paul Claes Nielsen
8	MF	USA	Caleb Robertson
9	FW	USA	Nathan Ferguson
10	MF	USA	Nzuhri Biggar
11	FW	USA	Lucas Wolthers
12	FW	USA	Jaxon Stokes
13	DF	USA	Hayden Robinson

No.	Pos.	Nation	Player
14	MF	USA	John McDowell
16	DF	SWE	Leon De Ciccio
17	DF	USA	AJ Elliott
18	DF	ENG	Callum Lee
19	FW	USA	Aiden Pierpoint
22	DF	CAN	Lucas Vidrascu
23	MF	USA	Elijah John
25	MF	USA	Emmanuel Aranda
27	MF	USA	Ethan Schlegel
28	DF	USA	Zain Abdelhadi
29	DF	USA	Dru Stanton
32	GK	USA	Adam Leonard
33	GK	USA	Jack Roach

== Conference membership ==
Source=

Years	Conference	Membership
1991–1993	NAIA Independent (TCAC in other sports)	—
1994–1995	Tennessee Collegiate Athletic Conference (TCAC)	Full member
1996–1999	NCAA Division I Independent (In transition from NAIA)	—
2000	Missouri Valley Conference	Affiliate member
2001–2011	Atlantic Sun Conference	Full member
2012–2013	NCAA Division I Independent (Ohio Valley Conference in other sports)	—
2014–2017	Horizon League	Affiliate member
2018–2021	Southern Conference	Affiliate member
2022–present	Missouri Valley Conference	Full member

== Coaching history ==
Source=

Years	Coach	W–L–T	Win. %
1991–1994	Grant Cuthill	24–47–5	.349
1995–1996	Ronnie Littlejohn	9–23–2	.294
1997–2013	Earle Davidson	97–184–21	.356
2014–2018	Bryan Green	7–28–2	.216
2019–Present	David Costa		
1991–2015	Totals	137–282–30	.339

== Notable alumni ==
- Jay Ayres
- J. P. Rodrigues
- Jansen Wilson
