= VMI Keydets men's soccer =

American college soccer team

VMI Keydets Men's Soccer
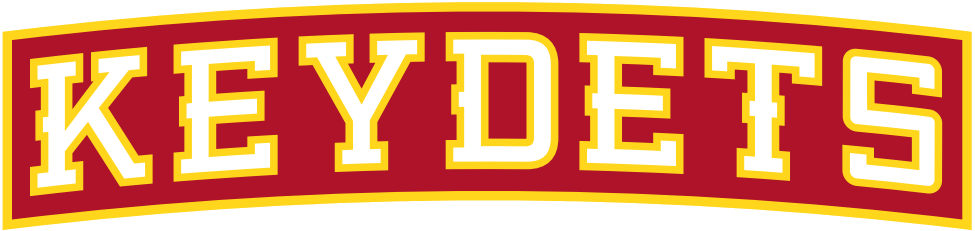
- Founded: 1953; 73 years ago
- University: Virginia Military Institute
- Head coach: Nick Regan (4th season)
- Conference: SoCon
- Location: Lexington, Virginia, US
- Stadium: Patchin Field (capacity: 1,000)
- Nickname: Keydets
- Colors: Red, white, and yellow
Home	Away

Pre-tournament ASHA championships
- 1885, 1889

The VMI Keydets men's soccer team is an intercollegiate varsity sports team of the Virginia Military Institute. The team is a member of the Southern Conference of the National Collegiate Athletic Association.

Prior to the varsity program, VMI had a club team which competed from the late 1870s until 1959. The club team has been retroactively deemed national champions by the American Soccer History Archives for the 1885 and 1889 college soccer seasons.

== History ==
=== Founding and Early Years (1953–1988) ===
The VMI men's soccer team began in the spring of 1953 as an unofficial club. The sport's introduction was grassroots, starting with a group of approximately ten cadets who began kicking a volleyball on a hill, lacking proper soccer equipment or a coach. Despite the lack of official recognition or funding from the Athletic Council, the team quickly grew, with 36 cadets registering to play. Using personal funds, the cadets purchased equipment and a few official soccer balls. They practiced diligently on their own time, holding sessions on Saturdays, Sundays, and Wednesdays.

The team played its inaugural season in the fall of 1953, competing in three games against Washington & Lee, Roanoke College, and Duke. The team continued to play without a coach until February 1954, when Captain Duncan Wolf, a West Point graduate and instructor on the ROTC staff, agreed to become the team's first coach. Captain Wolf was inspired by the "determination of the cadets and their enthusiasm." Following his appointment, the Athletic Council began considering soccer for official status as a regular sport, which would provide the team with official practice time and funding for equipment and travel. Plans were also underway for a more extensive 20-game schedule for the next year, which was to include matches against prominent programs like West Point, NC State, Maryland, and the University of Virginia.

=== The Stephen Ross Era (1989–2005) ===
Stephen Ross's tenure as head coach from 1989 to 2005 was the longest in program history, spanning 17 seasons. His coaching career totals at VMI were 92-186-15, representing a program-record 293 total matches coached.

The 1990 season was one of the most successful under Coach Ross, with the team finishing with a 9-7-2 overall record. This period produced several notable players, including Russell Rutter, who was named Southern Conference Freshman of the Year in 1990. Ross was recognized for his coaching efforts twice, earning the Southern Conference Coach of the Year award in 2001 and the Big South Coach of the Year award in 2004.

In 2003, the VMI men's soccer team transitioned from the Southern Conference to the Big South Conference.

=== Transition (2006–2022) ===
Following Coach Ross, the program entered a challenging period with frequent coaching changes. Ben Freakley coached from 2006 to 2009, followed by Richie Rose from 2010 to 2014. Jon Freeman coached for one season in 2015, and Michael Bonelli led the team from 2016 to 2018. The team returned to the Southern Conference in 2014.

Despite the team's struggles with its overall record during this period, individual players received recognition. Goalkeeper Alex Guerra was named to the All-Southern Conference 2nd Team in 2014 and the All-Southern Conference 1st Team in 2015, also earning the Southern Conference Goalkeeper of the Year award that season.

=== Nick Regan Era (2022–Present) ===
Nick Regan has served as the head coach of the VMI men's soccer program since 2022. Under his leadership, the team has achieved several notable milestones:

- In 2023, the Keydets recorded five wins, which was the most in 17 years. This included their first NCAA Division I win in nine years and their first Division I road victory in a decade.
- In the 2024 season, the team achieved five or more wins for the first time in back-to-back seasons since 2004–2005. The team also had three consecutive positive results against a Division I program for the first time since 2010.
- During his first season as head coach, the program reached a nine-year high for goals scored and a 14-year high for shutouts.
- The team's goalkeepers recorded four shutouts in the 2024 season, the most in 17 years, contributing to the highest win percentage in 16 seasons.
- In the 2025 season, The Keydets earned their first SoCon win since 2002, breaking an 87-match winless streak.

Under Regan, several players have also earned individual recognition. Three players have received Southern Conference (SoCon) All-Conference accolades: Cole Mooney was named to the Second Team in 2023, while Kyle Grant was named to the Freshman Team in 2023, and Anthony Huang was named to the Freshman Team in 2024.

Additionally, several players have been recognized as SoCon Players of the Week:

- Kyle Grant was named Offensive Player of the Week on September 26, 2023, and September 17, 2024.
- Dylan Holbach was named Defensive Player of the Week on September 26, 2023.
- Zack Murphy was named Defensive Player of the Week on September 24, 2024.
- Jesse Lee was named Offensive Player of the Week on September 30, 2025.
- Jack Yough was named Defensive Player of the Week on November 4, 2025.

== Seasons ==
Season	Head coach	Conference	Season results							Tournament results	
Season	Head coach	Conference	Overall			Conference				Conference (Note: The Southern Conference Men's Soccer Tournament did not begin until 1988.)	NCAA
Season	Head coach	Conference	W	L	T	W	L	T	Finish	Conference	NCAA
1972	Jay Sculley	Southern	1	10	0	0	3	0	7th	—	—
1973	Jay Sculley	Southern	2	7	2	1	5	0	6th	—	—
1974	John Knox	Southern	1	9	1	1	2	0	—	—	—
1975	Jim Clark	Southern	3	8	1	1	2	1	3rd	—	—
1976	Jim Clark	Southern	5	8	1	3	2	1	3rd	—	—
1977	Jay Sculley	Southern	7	8	0	3	2	0	2nd	—	—
1978	Jay Sculley	Southern	3	13	1	0	4	1	6th	—	—
1979	Jay Sculley	Southern	3	12	2	2	4	1	6th	—	—
1980	Jay Sculley	Southern	6	10	0	4	4	0	5th	—	—
1981	Nino Altomonte	Southern	4	11	1	2	5	1	5th	—	—
1982	Nino Altomonte	Southern	7	8	2	4	2	1	4th	—	—
1983	Nino Altomonte	Southern	0	15	0	0	6	0	4th, North	—	—
1984	Nino Altomonte	Southern	0	16	0	0	6	0	4th, North	—	—
1985	John Trudgeon	Southern	5	12	0	0	6	0	4th, North	—	—
1986	Doug Bartlett	Southern	2	15	0	0	5	0	6th	—	—
1987	Doug Bartlett	Southern	5	10	1	1	3	1	5th	—	—
1988	Doug Bartlett	Southern	6	13	1	1	3	0	5th	Semifinals	—
1989	Stephen Ross	Southern	5	9	1	0	3	1	5th	Quarterfinals	—
1990	Stephen Ross	Southern	9	7	2	0	3	1	5th	Quarterfinals	—
1991	Stephen Ross	Southern	6	11	0	1	3	0	4th	Quarterfinals	—
1992	Stephen Ross	Southern	4	14	0	1	5	0	6th	Semifinals	—
1993	Stephen Ross	Southern	5	14	1	1	4	1	6th	Quarterfinals	—
1994	Stephen Ross	Southern	5	10	1	2	4	0	5th	Quarterfinals	—
1995	Stephen Ross	Southern	8	11	0	2	4	0	6th	Quarterfinals	—
1996	Stephen Ross	Southern	6	13	0	1	5	0	6th	Quarterfinals	—
1997	Stephen Ross	Southern	1	16	2	1	5	1	6th	Quarterfinals	—
1998	Stephen Ross	Southern	1	14	1	0	8	0	9th	—	—
1999	Stephen Ross	Southern	6	10	1	0	7	1	9th	—	—
2000	Stephen Ross	Southern	5	12	0	2	6	0	7th	Quarterfinals	—
2001	Stephen Ross	Southern	6	11	1	3	4	1	6th	Quarterfinals	—
2002	Stephen Ross	Southern	3	10	4	2	6	0	7th	Semifinals (Note: The 2002 Southern Conference Tournament semifinal match against Davidson, and the final were cancelled due to inclement weather. Furman was declared the champion.)	—
2003	Stephen Ross	Southern	4	15	0	1	7	0	8th	—	—
2004	Stephen Ross	Big South	9	9	1	2	4	1	8th	Quarterfinals	—
2005	Stephen Ross	Big South	8	10	1	1	6	0	7th	Semifinals	—
2006	Ben Freakley	Big South	2	15	1	0	7	0	7th	Quarterfinals	—
2007	Ben Freakley	Big South	6	10	3	2	3	1	5th	Quarterfinals	—
2008	Ben Freakley	Big South	2	14	1	1	6	1	8th	Quarterfinals	—
2009	Ben Freakley	Big South	2	15	1	1	7	0	8th	Quarterfinals	—
2010	Richie Rose	Big South	3	12	2	3	5	0	5th	Quarterfinals	—
2011	Richie Rose	Big South	1	15	2	1	7	1	10th	—	—
2012	Richie Rose	Big South	2	14	1	1	8	1	10th	—	—
2013	Richie Rose	Big South	3	14	1	2	8	0	10th	—	—
2014	Richie Rose	Southern	1	17	1	0	10	0	6th	Quarterfinals	—
2015	Jon Freeman	Southern	0	19	0	0	10	0	6th	Quarterfinals	—
2016	Michael Bonelli	Southern	0	17	0	0	10	0	6th	Quarterfinals	—
2017	Michael Bonelli	Southern	0	16	2	0	10	0	6th	Quarterfinals	—
2018	Michael Bonelli	Southern	1	16	1	0	6	0	7th	Quarterfinals	—
2019	Charlie Hubbard	Southern	1	16	0	0	6	0	7th	First round	—
2020	Max Watson	Southern	2	9	0	0	6	0	7th	—	—
2021	Max Watson	Southern	1	16	1	0	6	0	7th	—	—
2022	Nick Regan	Southern	2	13	1	0	5	0	6th	Quarterfinals	
2023	Nick Regan	Southern	5	12	0	0	5	0	6th	Quarterfinals	
2024	Nick Regan	Southern	5	10	2	0	5	0	6th	Quarterfinals	
2025	Nick Regan	Southern	3	11	3	1	4	0	5th (Joint)	Quarterfinals	

== Coaching history ==
Years	Coach	GP	W	L	T	Pct.
1972–73, 1977–80	Jay Sculley	87	22	60	5	.282
1974	John Knox	11	1	9	1	.136
1975–76	Jim Clark	26	8	16	2	.346
1981–84	Nino Altomonte	64	11	50	3	.195
1985	John Trudgeon	17	5	12	0	.294
1986–88	Doug Bartlett	53	13	38	2	.264
1989–2005	Stephen Ross	293	92	186	15	.339
2006–09	Ben Freakley	72	12	54	6	.208
2010–14	Richie Rose	89	10	72	7	.152
2015	Jon Freeman	19	0	19	0	.000
2016–18	Michael Bonelli	53	1	49	3	.047
2019	Charlie Hubbard	17	1	16	0	.062
2020 - 2021	Max Watson	41	3	37	1	.132
2022 -	Nick Regan	67	15	46	6	.278
Total		909	194	664	51	.195
