= East Tennessee State Buccaneers men's soccer =

American college soccer team

- Founded: 2008
- University: East Tennessee State University
- Head coach: Allen Vital (2nd season)
- Conference: SoCon
- Location: Johnson City, Tennessee
- Stadium: Summers-Taylor Stadium (capacity: 2,000)
- Nickname: Bucs
- Colors: Navy blue and gold
Home	Away

NCAA tournament appearances
- 2010, 2013, 2016

Conference tournament championships
- 2010, 2013

Conference Regular Season championships
- 2016, 2023

The East Tennessee State Buccaneers men's soccer team is a varsity intercollegiate athletic team of East Tennessee State University in Johnson City, Tennessee, United States. The team is a member of the Southern Conference, which is part of the National Collegiate Athletic Association's Division I. ETSU's first men's soccer team was fielded in 2008. The team plays its home games at Summers-Taylor Stadium on the ETSU campus. The Buccaneers were coached by Bo Oshoniyi until he was hired away by Dartmouth College. In March 2018, ETSU announced the hiring of former University of Kentucky assistant coach David Casper. Following his dismissal in 2021, David Lilly assumed the post of head coach. Lilly would go on to win the 2023 SoCon Coach of the Year award. Allen Vital was appointed as the head coach in February 2024 following the departure of David Lilly to UAB Blazers men's soccer.

== History ==
East Tennessee State's varsity soccer program began in 2008, when the Buccaneers began play in the Atlantic Sun Conference. Since the Bucs had already been an established Division I school in other sports and a full-member of the Atlantic Sun Conference, the new program was immediately eligible for postseason play, namely the Atlantic Sun Men's Soccer Tournament and the NCAA Division I Men's Soccer Championship.

During the 2008 campaign, the Buccaneers fared well in non-conference play, achieving a record of 5–3 record; however, the Bucs finished towards the bottom of the A-Sun table, with a 1–7–1 conference record. It was not until 2010 that ETSU achieved a winning record, where the Bucs finished the season 15–6 overall and with a 7–2 conference record. Led by future professional Aaron Schoenfeld, the Bucs won both the Atlantic Sun regular season and the conference tournament, earning their first NCAA berth two years after the beginning of the program. The Bucs lost their first NCAA tournament match, 3–2, to the College of Charleston Cougars. The Bucs returned to the NCAAs in 2013 and 2016.

== Players ==
=== Current squad ===
- Updated November 7, 2025

Note: Flags indicate national team as defined under FIFA eligibility rules; some limited exceptions apply. Players may hold more than one non-FIFA nationality.

No.	Pos.	Nation	Player
0	GK	USA	Sam McGee
1	GK	SWE	Emil Holmberg
2	DF	BRA	Henrique Cruz
3	DF	CHI	Pablo Ramirez
4	DF	ENG	Ryan Suckling
5	MF	BEL	Ulysses Hendriks
6	DF	ESP	Albert Montragull
7	FW	NGA	Stanley Isaac
8	MF	USA	Gabriel Betancourt
9	FW	USA	Zayd Idlibi
10	MF	NOR	Ingvar Kolbjornsen
11	FW	ESP	Sergio Baguena
12	MF	NOR	Berkay Duman
13	DF	USA	Jason Gun
14	FW	USA	Noah Franks
15	DF	ITA	Nicola Brocca

No.	Pos.	Nation	Player
16	DF	USA	Josue Camacho
17	FW	KOR	Jimmy Choi
19	DF	NOR	Jonathan de Lange
20	MF	USA	Rodrigue Moussa
21	MF	USA	Matias Delellis
22	DF	NOR	Morgan Marvik
23	DF	USA	George Chunuwe
24	FW	CAN	Noel Poole
25	MF	USA	Shewit Worton
26	GK	USA	Max Kaplan
27	DF	USA	Khalifah Atolagbe
29	MF	USA	Jaime Carrillo
35	GK	USA	Will Bowers

=== Notable players ===
- Aaron Schoenfeld (born 1990) - former professional soccer player
- Jonny Campbell (born 1991) - professional soccer player
- Charlie Machell (born 1994) - professional soccer player
- Cameron Woodfin (born 1996) - semi-professional soccer player
- Nick Spielman (born 1996) - professional soccer player

== Seasons ==
Statistics overview
Season	Coach	Overall	Conference	Standing	Postseason
Scott Calabrese (A-SUN) (2008–2013)
2008	Scott Calabrese	6–10–1	1–7–1	9th	
2009	Scott Calabrese	6–9–3	4–4–1	4th	
2010	Scott Calabrese	15–6–0	7–2–0	1st	NCAA 1st round
2011	Scott Calabrese	10–7–4	3–4–1	6th	
2012	Scott Calabrese	10–6–4	5–2–1	3rd	
2013	Scott Calabrese	10–6–4	5–2–1	2nd	NCAA 1st round
Scott Calabrese:		57–44–16 .556	25–21–5 .539		
Bo Oshoniyi (SoCon) (2014–2017)
2014	Bo Oshoniyi	7–10–1	3–6–1	5th	
2015	Bo Oshoniyi	8–7–4	4–4–2	4th	
2016	Bo Oshoniyi	12–5–3	7–1–2	1st	NCAA 1st round
2017	Bo Oshoniyi	9–2–7	6–0–4	1st	
Bo Oshoniyi:		36–24–15 .580	20–11–9 .613		
David Casper (SoCon) (2018–2022)
2018	David Casper	9–7–1	4–1–1	2nd	
2019	David Casper	8–8–2	4–2–0	3rd	
2020	David Casper	3–5–3	3–1–2	3rd	
2021	David Casper	4–8–3	1–3–2	5th	
David Casper:		24–28–9 .467	12–7–5 .604		
David Lilly (SoCon) (2022–2024)
2022	David Lilly	8–6–3	3–1–1	2nd	
2023	David Lilly	9–5–3	4–0–1	1st	
David Lilly:		17–11–6 .588	7–1–2 .800		
Allen Vital (SoCon) (2024–present)
2024	Allen Vital	5–7–5	3–1–1	T-1st	
2025	Allen Vital	2–9–4	2–3–0	4th	
Allen Vital:		7–16–9 .359	5–4–1 .550		
Total:		108–92–42 .533	54–38–15 .575		
National champion Postseason invitational champion Conference regular season champion Conference regular season and conference tournament champion Division regular season champion Division regular season and conference tournament champion Conference tournament champion

=== NCAA tournament results ===
ETSU has appeared in three NCAA tournaments.

Year	Record	Seed	Region	Round	Opponent	Results	Ref.
2010	15–6	N/A	1	First Round	Charleston	L 2–3	
2013	10–6–4	N/A	2	First Round	Coastal Carolina	L 0–2	
2016	12–5–3	N/A	4	First Round	Virginia Tech	L 0–1	
