= Furman Paladins men's soccer =

American college soccer team

- 2026 Furman Paladins men's soccer team
- Founded: 1967; 59 years ago
- University: Furman University
- Head coach: Brandon Tucker (1st season)
- Conference: SoCon
- Location: Greenville, South Carolina, US
- Stadium: Stone III Stadium (capacity: 3,000)
- Nickname: Paladins
- Colors: Royal purple and white
Home	Away

NCAA tournament College Cup
- 2025

NCAA tournament Quarterfinals
- 1999, 2025

NCAA tournament Round of 16
- 1999, 2002, 2025

NCAA tournament appearances
- 1991, 1993, 1994, 1996, 1999, 2000, 2001, 2002, 2007, 2011, 2014, 2015, 2018, 2024, 2025

Conference tournament championships
- 1988, 1989, 1991, 1993, 1994, 1996, 1997, 1999, 2000, 2001, 2002, 2007, 2014, 2015, 2018, 2024, 2025

Conference regular season championships
- 1983, 1984, 1986, 1987, 1988, 1990, 1991, 1992, 1993, 1994, 1995, 1996, 1998, 1999, 2000, 2001, 2002, 2007, 2010, 2019, 2020

The Furman Paladins men's soccer team represents Furman University in Greenville, South Carolina, in men's college soccer. The team is a member of the Southern Conference, which is part of the National Collegiate Athletic Association's Division I. The team plays its home games at Eugene Stone Stadium in Greenville. The Paladins are coached by Doug Allison.

Furman's first men's soccer team was fielded in 1967. Several notable U.S. national team players played for Furman including Ricardo Clark, Clint Dempsey, and Walker Zimmerman. In 2025, Furman appeared in the program's first-ever NCAA College Cup (Final 4).

== Seasons ==
Season	Team	Overall	Conference	Standing	Postseason
Klaus Schumann (SoCon) (1967–1967)
1967	Klaus Schumann	3–7–0	0–1–0	3rd (Southern)	
Klaus Schumann:		3–7–0	0–1–0		
Paul Scarpa (SoCon) (1968–1981)
1968	Paul Scarpa	2–8–1	0–2–1	5th	
1969	Paul Scarpa	2–10–0	0–3–0	6th	
1970	Paul Scarpa	3–8–1	1–1–1	3rd	
1971	Paul Scarpa	1–8–2	0–4–1	5th	
1972	Paul Scarpa	4–6–1	1–1–1	5th	
1973	Paul Scarpa	4–6–1	0–2–1	T–6th	
1974	Paul Scarpa	3–8–1	0–3–1	7th	
1975	Paul Scarpa	6–6–0	1–2–0	T–5th	
1976	Paul Scarpa	0–10–3	0–5–1	7th	
1977	Paul Scarpa	5–8–1	1–4–0	5th	
1978	Paul Scarpa	7–6–1	3–2–0	T–2nd	
1979	Paul Scarpa	6–7–1	5–2–0	3rd	
1980	Paul Scarpa	10–6–0	6–2–0	T–2nd	
1981	Paul Scarpa	8–9–0	5–3–0	3rd	
Paul Scarpa:		61–106–13	23–36–7		
John Tart (SoCon) (1982–1994)
1982	John Tart	6–11–1	3–4–0	T–5th	
1983	John Tart	11–6–2	6–0–0	1st (South)	
1984	John Tart	11–6–2	6–0–0	1st (South)	
1985	John Tart	11–9–1	4–0–0	1st (South)	
1986	John Tart	13–4–2	5–0–0	1st	
1987	John Tart	12–6–1	5–0–0	1st	
1988	John Tart	11–6–2	4–0–0	1st	
1989	John Tart	10–8–2	2–1–0	2nd	
1990	John Tart	6–9–3	3–1–0	1st	
1991	John Tart	15–5–1	6–0–0	1st	NCAA Second round
1992	John Tart	11–6–2	6–0–0	1st	
1993	John Tart	12–6–1	6–0–0	1st	NCAA First round
1994	John Tart	8–10–3	5–1–0	T–1st	NCAA Play-in
John Tart:		137–92–19	61–7–0		
Doug Allison (SoCon) (1995–present)
1995	Doug Allison	11–5–3	5–1–0	T–1st	
1996	Doug Allison	16–4–1	6–0–0	1st	NCAA Play-in
1997	Doug Allison	14–6–0	5–2–0	T–2nd	NCAA Play-in
1998	Doug Allison	16–4–2	7–1–0	T–1st	
1999	Doug Allison	21–2–1	8–0–0	1st	NCAA Quarterfinals
2000	Doug Allison	17–5–0	8–0–0	1st	NCAA First round
2001	Doug Allison	17–4–2	8–0–0	1st	NCAA First round
2002	Doug Allison	19–3–1	8–0–0	1st	NCAA Regional 1 Semifinals
2003	Doug Allison	6–9–4	3–2–2	4th	
2004	Doug Allison	6–10–2	2–5–0	6th	
2005	Doug Allison	8–8–4	4–3–0	T–4th	
2006	Doug Allison	11–7–1	4–2–1	3rd	
2007	Doug Allison	19–4–0	7–0–0	3rd	NCAA Second round
2008	Doug Allison	11–8–1	4–3–0	T–2nd	
2009	Doug Allison	8–8–2	3–4–0	T–5th	
2010	Doug Allison	10–7–4	4–1–2	T–1st	
2011	Doug Allison	14–4–4	4–1–2	2nd	NCAA First round
2012	Doug Allison	12–4–3	4–2–1	T–2nd	
2013	Doug Allison	11–5–2	2–2–2	4th	
2014	Doug Allison	12–5–5	5–4–1	T–3rd	NCAA Second round
2015	Doug Allison	8–5–6	6–2–2	2nd	NCAA First round
2016	Doug Allison	6–9–3	2–6–2	5th	
2017	Doug Allison	12–5–3	5–2–3	3rd	
2018	Doug Allison	13–7–2	4–2–0	3rd	NCAA Second round
2019	Doug Allison	11–7–1	5–1–0	T–1st	
2020	Doug Allison	7–2–1	5–0–1	1st	
2021	Doug Allison	7–9–1	4–2–0	T–3rd	
2022	Doug Allison	7–7–4	1–3–1	5th	
2023	Doug Allison	10–6–3	2–2–1	3rd	
2024	Doug Allison	9–4–6	2–1–2	T–3rd	NCAA Second round
2025	Doug Allison	16–2–5	4–0–1	1st	NCAA Semifinal
Doug Allison:		365–175–77	141–54–24		
Total:		566–380–109 (.588)			
National champion Postseason invitational champion Conference regular season champion Conference regular season and conference tournament champion Division regular season champion Division regular season and conference tournament champion Conference tournament champion

== Coaching history ==
Furman has had four head coaches in program history.

Years	Coach	GP	W	L	T	Pct.
1967	Klaus Schumann	10	3	7	0	.300
1968–1981	Paul Scarpa	180	61	106	13	.375
1982–1994	John Tart	248	137	92	19	.591
1995–2025	Doug Allison	634	365	175	77	.654
2026–	Brandon Tucker	0	0	0	0	–

== Individual achievements ==
=== All-Americans ===
Furman has produced 11 All-Americans.

Year(s)	Nat.	Player	Pos.
1986, 1988	(Wales)	Osian Roberts	MF
1996, 1997	(United States)	Pete Santora	FW
1999	(United States)	Daniel Alvarez	MF
1999, 2000, 2001	(Bermuda)	John Barry Nusum	FW
1999, 2000	(United States)	Matt Goldsmith	MF
2002	(United States)	Ricardo Clark	MF
2002	(United States)	Clint Dempsey	FW
2007	(United States)	Jon Leathers	DF
2007	(United States)	Shea Salinas	MF
2011, 2012	(United States)	Walker Zimmerman	DF
2025	(United States)	Diego Hernandez	MF
