= UNC Greensboro Spartans men's soccer =

American college soccer team

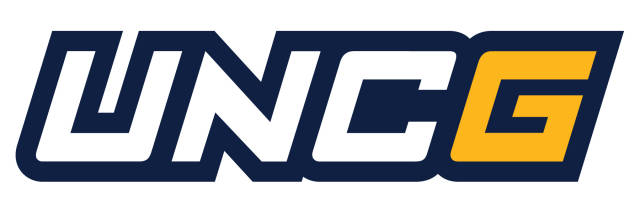
- Founded: 1971; 55 years ago
- University: University of North Carolina at Greensboro
- Head coach: Chris Rich
- Conference: SoCon
- Location: Greensboro, North Carolina, US
- Stadium: UNCG Soccer Stadium (capacity: 3,540)
- Nickname: UNCG, Spartans
- Colors: Navy, white, and gold
Home	Away

NCAA tournament championships
- Division III: 1982, 1983, 1985, 1986, 1987

NCAA tournament runner-up
- Division II: 1989

NCAA tournament College Cup
- Division II: 1989 Division III: 1982, 1983, 1985, 1986, 1987

NCAA tournament Quarterfinals
- Division I: 2022 Division II: 1989, 1990 Division III: 1981, 1982, 1983, 1984, 1985, 1986, 1987

NCAA tournament Round of 16
- Division I: 2004, 2005, 2006, 2008, 2022, 2025 Division II: 1989, 1990 Division III: 1981, 1982, 1983, 1984, 1985, 1986, 1987

NCAA tournament Round of 32
- Division I: 1998, 2004, 2005, 2006, 2008, 2022, 2025 Division II: 1989, 1990 Division III: 1981, 1982, 1983, 1984, 1985, 1986, 1987

NCAA tournament appearances
- Division I: 1993, 1994, 1995, 1996, 1998, 2004, 2005, 2006, 2008, 2010, 2020, 2022, 2025 Division II: 1989, 1990, 1991 Division III: 1981, 1982, 1983, 1984, 1985, 1986, 1987

Conference tournament championships
- 1981, 1984, 1985, 1986, 1993, 1994, 1996, 1998, 2004, 2005, 2006, 2008, 2010, 2020, 2022

Conference regular season championships
- 1981, 1982, 1983, 1984, 1985, 1986, 1987, 1993, 1994, 1995, 1996, 1997, 1998, 2004, 2005, 2006, 2010, 2011, 2015, 2019, 2021, 2022, 2024

The UNC Greensboro (UNCG) Spartans Men's Soccer Team is the varsity intercollegiate athletic team of University of North Carolina at Greensboro in Greensboro, North Carolina, United States. The team is a member of the Southern Conference, which is part of the National Collegiate Athletic Association's Division I. UNCG's first men's soccer team was fielded in 1971. The team plays its home games at UNCG Soccer Stadium in Greensboro.

Historically, UNCG has been one of the most successful college soccer teams in North Carolina. In the 1980s, UNCG, while still playing in NCAA Division III, won five NCAA Division III Men's Soccer National Championships. In the mid-2000s, the Spartans reached three Sweet Sixteens in the NCAA Division I Men's Soccer Tournament. In the late 2000s and early 2010s, the program had several NCAA violations that caused the program to forfeit several losses; In addition to the losses, the program also suffered the loss of their head coach at the time, a fine of $5,000 payable to the NCAA, and significant recruitment and recruitment communications suspensions.

== Seasons ==
Season	Coach	Overall	Conference	Standing	Postseason
Terrell West (NCAA Division III Independent) (1971)
1971	Terrell West	3–4–0			
Terrell West:		3–4–0			
Bill Utter (NCAA Division III Independent) (1972–1973)
1972	Bill Utter	2–7–1			
1973	Bill Utter	4–6–0			
Bill Utter:		6–13–1			
Joe Lukaszewski (Dixie Intercollegiate Athletic Conference) (1974–1977)
1974	Joe Lukaszewski	5–3–3	5–2–0	3rd	
1975	Joe Lukaszewski	4–10–1	1–5–1	6th	
1976	Joe Lukaszewski	2–13–1	2–4–1	6th	
1977	Joe Lukaszewski	5–11–2	2–4–1	7th	
Joe Lukaszewski:		12–34–6	10–15–3		
Geoff Bird (Dixie Intercollegiate Athletic Conference) (1978–1979)
1978	Geoff Bird	8–10–1	3–4–0	6th	
1979	Geoff Bird	9–5–5	3–1–3	4th	
Geoff Bird:		21–18–8	6–5–3		
Mike Berticelli (Dixie Intercollegiate Athletic Conference) (1980–1983)
1980	Mike Berticelli	12–3–3	5–1–1	2nd	
1981	Mike Berticelli	16–2–1	6–0–0	1st	NCAA Division III Quarterfinals
1982	Mike Berticelli	19–3–0	5–1–0	T–1st	NCAA Division III Champions
1983	Mike Berticelli	23–1–1	7–0–0	1st	NCAA Division III Champions
Mike Berticelli:		70–9–5	23–2–1		
Michael Parker (Dixie Intercollegiate Athletic Conference) (1984–1987)
1984	Michael Parker	17–2–2	7–0–0	1st	NCAA Division III Quarterfinals
1985	Michael Parker	20–5–0	7–0–0	1st	NCAA Division III Champions
1986	Michael Parker	18–5–0	6–1–0	1st	NCAA Division III Champions
1987	Michael Parker	17–7–1	6–1–0	T–1st	NCAA Division III Champions
Michael Parker (NCAA Division II Independent) (1988–1991)
1988	Michael Parker	13–7–0			
1989	Michael Parker	19–4–1			NCAA Division II runner-up
1990	Michael Parker	14–6–0			NCAA Division II Quarterfinals
1991	Michael Parker	13–6–1			
Michael Parker (Big South Conference) (1992–1996)
1992	Michael Parker	14–8–0	3–4–0	T–6th	
1993	Michael Parker	14–6–2	6–2–1	T–2nd	NCAA First round
1994	Michael Parker	17–5–0	7–1–0	1st	NCAA First round
1995	Michael Parker	12–5–3	5–0–2	1st	NCAA First round
1996	Michael Parker	21–2–0	7–0–0	1st	NCAA First round
Michael Parker (SoCon) (1997–2009)
1997	Michael Parker	14–7–0	6–1–0	1st	
1998	Michael Parker	14–7–0	6–1–0	T–1st	NCAA Second round
1999	Michael Parker	13–8–0	7–1–0	2nd	
2000	Michael Parker	12–7–1	6–2–0	T–2nd	
2001	Michael Parker	13–8–0	6–2–0	T–2nd	
2002	Michael Parker	14–8–0	5–3–0	T–4th	
2003	Michael Parker	10–8–2	4–1–2	3rd	
2004	Michael Parker	19–3–1	6–0–1	1st	NCAA Third round
2005	Michael Parker	16–6–1	5–1–0	T–1st	NCAA Third round
2006	Michael Parker	16–8–1	5–1–1	1st	NCAA Third round
2007 (Note: UNCG was ruled to vacate 61 victories and ties between the 2007–11 seasons due to a ruling by the NCAA Committee on Infractions.)	Michael Parker	0–8–0	0–3–0	T–2nd	
2008	Michael Parker	0–11–0	0–5–0	T–6th	NCAA Third round
2009	Michael Parker	0–10–0	0–3–0	4th	
Michael Parker:		382–165–26	110–33–7		
Justin Maullin (SoCon) (2010–2018)
2010	Justin Maullin	0–6–0	0–1–0	T–1st	NCAA First round
2011	Justin Maullin	0–8–0	0–1–0	1st	
2012	Justin Maullin	5–10–2	3–4–0	5th	
2013	Justin Maullin	8–9–2	3–2–1	3rd	
2014	Justin Maullin	6–12–2	5–4–1	4th	
2015	Justin Maullin	11–5–5	6–1–1	1st	
2016	Justin Maullin	11–7–2	6–4–0	T–3rd	
2017	Justin Maullin	10–7–3	6–3–1	2nd	
2018	Justin Maullin	8–9–2	2–2–2	5th	
Justin Maullin:		59–73–18	31–22–6		
Chris Rich (SoCon) (2019–present)
2019	Chris Rich	9–9–1	5–1–0	T–1st	
2020	Chris Rich	9–3–2	3–2–1	T–2nd	NCAA First round
2021	Chris Rich	13–4–1	5–1–0	1st	
2022	Chris Rich	13–2–6	4–0–1	1st	NCAA Quarterfinals
2023	Chris Rich	2–10–5	1–2–2	T–4th	
2024	Chris Rich	10–2–5	3–1–1	T–1st	
2025	Chris Rich	12–5–6	3–2–0	3rd	NCAA Third round
Chris Rich:		58–33–21	24–9–5		
Total:		615–335–83 (.636)			
National champion Postseason invitational champion Conference regular season champion Conference regular season and conference tournament champion Division regular season champion Division regular season and conference tournament champion Conference tournament champion

== Individual Honors ==
First team All-Americans
Nat.	Player	Position	Year
USA	Mike Sweeney		1983
USA	Ed Radwanski		1983
USA	Eddie Radwanski (2)		1984
USA	Brian Japp		1985
USA	Jason Haupt		1989
USA	Jason Haupt (2)		1990
ISL	Sigurður Eyjólfsson		1997
TRI	Randi Patterson		2004
PUR	Scott Jones		2005
CMR	J.C. Ngando		2022

Second team All-Americans
Nat.	Player	Position	Year
USA	George Dyer		1984
USA	Carl Fleming		1988
ISL	Sigurður Eyjólfsson		1996
USA	Chris Goos		2002
PUR	Scott Jones		2004
TRI	Randi Patterson		2005
FRA	Théo Collomb		2021

Third team All-Americans

Nat.	Player	Position	Year
USA	Lewis Johnstone		1982
USA	Steve Harrison		1985
USA	Andrew Mehalko		1986
USA	Willie Lopez		1987
ISL	Sigurður Eyjólfsson		1998
PUR	Scott Jones		2006
FRA	Enzo Dovlo	Forward	2025

== Team Honors ==
=== NCAA Division I Honors ===
- Big South Conference
  - Regular season (4): 1993, 1994, 1995, 1996
  - Tournament (3): 1993, 1994, 1996
- Southern Conference
  - Regular season (12): 1997, 1998, 2004, 2005, 2006, 2010, 2011, 2015, 2019, 2021, 2022, 2024
  - Tournament (8): 1998, 2004, 2005, 2006, 2008, 2010, 2020–21, 2022

=== NCAA Division II Honors ===
- NCAA Division II Men's Soccer Tournament
  - Runners-up (1): 1989

=== NCAA Division III Honors ===
- NCAA Division III Men's Soccer Tournament
  - Winners (5): 1982, 1983, 1985, 1986, 1987
- Dixie Conference
  - Regular season (7): 1981, 1982, 1983, 1984, 1985, 1986, 1987
  - Tournament (6): 1981, 1982, 1983, 1984, 1985, 1986
