= 2025 Atlantic Coast Conference men's soccer season =

- League: NCAA Division I
- Sport: Soccer
- Duration: August 21, 2025 – October 31, 2025
- Teams: 15

2026 MLS SuperDraft
- Top draft pick: Nikola Markovic, 1st overall
- Picked by: D.C. United

Regular season
- Season champions: Virginia
- Runners-up: Stanford
- Season MVP: Offensive:Donavan Phillip; Midfielder:Ransford Gyan; Defensive:Nikola Markovic
- Top scorer: Donavan Phillip (NC State)

ACC tournament
- Champions: SMU
- Runners-up: Virginia
- Finals MVP: (United States) Slade Starnes

ACC men's soccer seasons
- ← 2024 2026 →

2025 ACC men's soccer standings
	Conf.					Overall
Team	W		L		T	W		L		T
No. 11 Virginia †+	5	–	0	–	3	12	–	2	–	5
No. 9 Stanford +	5	–	2	–	1	14	–	4	–	2
No. 2 NC State +	4	–	1	–	3	16	–	3	–	4
Clemson +	4	–	2	–	2	8	–	6	–	3
Duke +	4	–	2	–	2	10	–	4	–	6
Syracuse +	4	–	3	–	1	9	–	8	–	3
No. 15 SMU ‡	3	–	2	–	3	11	–	5	–	4
Notre Dame +	3	–	3	–	2	9	–	7	–	4
North Carolina +	2	–	2	–	4	9	–	5	–	6
Wake Forest	2	–	3	–	3	7	–	4	–	6
Virginia Tech	2	–	3	–	3	7	–	4	–	5
California	2	–	5	–	1	8	–	8	–	2
Pittsburgh	1	–	4	–	3	6	–	7	–	5
Louisville	1	–	5	–	2	5	–	7	–	5
Boston College	1	–	6	–	1	7	–	9	–	1
† – Conference champion ‡ – ACC tournament champion + – At-large invitation to the 2025 NCAA tournament; As of May 2, 2026; Rankings from United Soccer Coaches; Source:The ACC

The 2025 Atlantic Coast Conference men's soccer season was the 72nd season of men's varsity soccer in the conference. The season began on August 21. Conference play began in September and concluded in October. The 2025 ACC men's soccer tournament was held from November 5 through November 16 at campus sites and at WakeMed Soccer Park in Cary, North Carolina.

Pittsburgh were the defending regular season champions. The Wake Forest Demon Deacons were the defending ACC tournament champions.

Virginia won the regular season title with an undefeated 5–0–3 regular season record. They were unable to convert their regular season title into an ACC Tournament title, as they lost in the final to SMU. Nine teams from the ACC qualified for the NCAA Tournament.

== Teams ==
=== Stadiums and locations ===
Team	Stadium	Capacity
Boston College	Newton Campus Soccer Field	1,800
California	Edwards Stadium	22,000
Clemson	Riggs Field	6,500
Duke	Koskinen Stadium	7,000
Louisville	Lynn Stadium	5,300
NC State	Dail Soccer Field	3,000
Notre Dame	Alumni Stadium	2,500

Team	Stadium	Capacity
North Carolina	Dorrance Field	4,200
Pittsburgh	Ambrose Urbanic Field	735
SMU	Washburne Stadium	2,577
Stanford	Laird Q. Cagan Stadium	2,952
Syracuse	SU Soccer Stadium	1,500
Virginia	Klöckner Stadium	7,100
Virginia Tech	Thompson Field	2,500
Wake Forest	Spry Stadium	3,000

Note: Florida State, Georgia Tech and Miami (FL) are members of the Atlantic Coast Conference but do not sponsor men's soccer.

== Coaches ==
=== Head coaching records ===
Team	Head coach	Years at school	Overall record	Record at school	ACC record
Boston College	Bob Thompson	6	19–31–19	19–31–19	5–20–12
California	Leonard Griffin	4	39–43–17	19–22–13	2–4–2
Clemson	Mike Noonan	16	407–199–88	183–84–85	65–43–19
Duke	John Kerr Jr.	18	241–163–55	161–104–42	62–57–24
Louisville	John Michael Hayden	7	52–42–14	52–42–14	19–25–8
North Carolina	Carlos Somoano	15	176–62–48	176–62–48	70–30–28
NC State	Marc Hubbard	2	242–53–46	10–5–5	3–3–2
Notre Dame	Chad Riley	8	122–67–39	71–44–22	26–24–8
Pittsburgh	Jay Vidovich	10	296–122–44	89–68–13	32–32–10
SMU	Kevin Hudson	10	115–44–23	115–44–23	4–2–2
Stanford	Jeremy Gunn	14	345–113–82	158–52–51	3–2–3
Syracuse	Ian McIntyre	16	246–163–82	139–99–50	24–45–24
Virginia	George Gelnovatch	30	377–154–71	377–154–71	108–77–38
Virginia Tech	Mike Brizendine	17	113–137–43	113–137–43	29–82–23
Wake Forest	Bobby Muuss	11	227–95–49	152–39–25	56–14–13

Notes

- Records shown are prior to the 2025 season
- Years at school includes the 2025 season
- ACC records include only years with current school.

== Preseason ==
=== Hermann Trophy ===
The Hermann Trophy preseason watchlist was released on August 21, 2025. Five ACC players were selected the preseason watchlist.

Player	Class	Position	School
Ulfur Bjornsson	Junior	FW	Duke
Cooper Flax	Senior	MF	Wake Forest
Ransford Gyan	Sophomore	MF	Clemson
Luca Nikolai	Junior	DF	North Carolina
Casper Svenby	Senior	DF	Pittsburgh

=== Preseason Poll ===
The pre-season poll and pre-season all conference teams were voted on by the league's 15 head coaches. The results of the poll were released on August 13, prior to the season starting. The full results of the poll are shown below:

Predicted finish	Team	Points (1st place)
1	Clemson	185 (4)
2	Wake Forest	175 (5)
3	Pittsburgh	167 (4)
4	Duke	160 (2)
T-5	SMU	136
T-5	Stanford	136
7	North Carolina	115
8	NC State	108
9	Virginia	104
10	Notre Dame	81
11	Syracuse	63
12	California	57
13	Virginia Tech	34
14	Louisville	33
15	Boston College	21

=== Preseason awards ===
Preseason All-ACC Watchlist

Position	Player	Class	School
Goalkeeper	Sam Joseph	Senior	Virginia Tech
Goalkeeper	Alex Svetanoff	Junior	Louisville
Defender	Chimere Omeze	Sophomore	Syracuse
Defender	Alfredo Ortiz	Senior	California
Defender	Casper Svendby	Senior	Pittsburgh
Midfielder	Zach Bohane	Senior	Stanford
Midfielder	Andrew Czech	Graduate Student	North Carolina
Midfielder	Ask Ekeland	Senior	Boston College
Midfielder	Cooper Flax	Senior	Wake Forest
Midfielder	Ransford Gyan	Sophomore	Clemson
Midfielder	Wyatt Lewis	Junior	Notre Dame
Midfielder	Jaylinn Mitchell	Junior	SMU
Midfielder	Umberto Pelà	Senior	Virginia
Forward	Ulfur Bjornsson	Junior	Duke
Forward	Donavan Phillip	Junior	NC State

== Regular season ==
Index to colors and formatting
ACC member won
ACC member lost
ACC member tied
ACC teams in **bold**

All times Eastern.

=== Week 1 (Aug. 19 – Aug. 25) ===
Date	Time (ET)	Visiting team	Home team	Site	Result	Attendance
August 21	5:00 p.m.	Southern Indiana	**Louisville**	Lynn Stadium • Louisville, KY	**W** 6–0	640
August 21	5:30 p.m.	Binghamton	**Boston College**	Newton Soccer Complex • Chestnut Hill, MA	**W** 1–0	517
August 21	6:00 p.m.	Queens	**No. 14 NC State**	Dail Soccer Field • Raleigh, NC	**W** 2–0	2,138
August 21	6:00 p.m.	Sacramento State	**No. 13 Stanford**	Cagan Stadium • Stanford, CA	**W** 5–1	591
August 21	7:00 p.m.	Connecticut	**Syracuse**	SU Soccer Stadium • Syracuse, NY	**L** 0–1	1,565
August 21	7:00 p.m.	**Notre Dame**	Michigan	U-M Soccer Stadium • Ann Arbor, MI	**T** 1–1	1,400
August 21	7:00 p.m.	No. 3 Ohio State	**Virginia Tech**	Thompson Field • Blacksburg, VA	**W** 1–0	1,532
August 21	7:30 p.m.	UCF	**North Carolina**	Dorrance Field • Chapel Hill, NC	**W** 3–1	3,430
August 21	8:00 p.m.	**California**	Saint Mary's	Saint Mary's Stadium • Moraga, CA	**W** 3–2	357
August 21	8:00 p.m.	**No. 9 Clemson**	No. 11 Indiana	Armstrong Stadium • Bloomington, IN	**T** 2–2	6,395
August 21	8:00 p.m.	No. 18 Kansas City	**No. 5 SMU**	Washburne Stadium • Dallas, Texas	**T** 2–2	1,016
August 21	8:00 p.m.	Maryland	**No. 6 Wake Forest**	Spry Stadium • Winston-Salem, NC	Cancelled	
August 21	8:00 p.m.	Quinnipiac	**No. 7 Pittsburgh**	Ambrose Urbanic Field • Pittsburgh, PA	**W** 1–0	1,719
August 21	8:00 p.m.	San Diego	**No. 15 Duke**	Koskinen Stadium • Durham, NC	**W** 2–1	781
August 21	8:00 p.m.	San Diego State	**No. 17 Virginia**	Klöckner Stadium • Charlottesville, VA	**W** 2–0	0
August 24	12:00 p.m.	**Syracuse**	Loyola (MD)	Ridley Athletic Complex • Baltimore, MD	**W** 1–0	258
August 24	3:00 p.m.	Canisius	**Virginia Tech**	Thompson Field • Blacksburg, VA	**W** 2–0	1,168
August 24	6:00 p.m.	Wofford	**No. 14 NC State**	Dail Soccer Field • Raleigh, NC	**W** 6–0	3,241
August 24	7:00 p.m.	Stetson	**No. 17 Virginia**	Klöckner Stadium • Charlottesville, VA	**W** 1–0	534
August 24	7:00 p.m.	UCF	**No. 6 Wake Forest**	Spry Stadium • Winston-Salem, NC	**W** 2–1	2,257
August 24	7:00 p.m.	UC San Diego	**No. 15 Duke**	Koskinen Stadium • Durham, NC	**W** 1–0	826
August 24	7:30 p.m.	IU Indy	**Notre Dame**	Alumni Stadium • Notre Dame, IN	**T** 0–0	569
August 24	7:30 p.m.	**North Carolina**	Seattle	Championship Field • Seattle, WA	**W** 2–1	1,079
August 24	8:30 p.m.	**No. 5 SMU**	Saint Louis	Hermann Stadium • St. Louis, MO	**L** 0–1	4,097
August 24	10:00 p.m.	**California**	UCLA	Wallis Annenberg Stadium • Los Angeles, CA	**W** 1–0	1,206
August 24	10:00 p.m.	No. 4 Denver	**No. 13 Stanford**	Cagan Stadium • Stanford, CA	**W** 2–1	952
August 25	5:30 p.m.	Siena	**Boston College**	Newton Soccer Complex • Chestnut Hill, MA	**L** 1–3	415
August 25	7:00 p.m.	Michigan State	**No. 7 Pittsburgh**	Ambrose Urbanic Field • Pittsburgh, PA	**W** 3–2	986
August 25	8:00 p.m.	**Louisville**	UAB	PNC Field • Birmingham, AL	**W** 1–0	595

Players of the Week

Offensive		Defensive	
Player	Team	Player	Team
Luka Lukic	California	Sam Joseph	Virginia Tech

=== Week 2 (Aug. 26 – Sep. 1) ===
Date	Time (ET)	Visiting team	Home team	Site	Result	Attendance
August 26	7:00 p.m.	South Carolina	**No. 6 Clemson**	Riggs Field • Clemson, SC	**W** 4–1	6,536
August 28	5:30 p.m.	Oral Roberts	**No. 5 Wake Forest**	Spry Stadium • Winston-Salem, NC	**W** 2–0	1,279
August 28	7:00 p.m.	**No. 11 Virginia**	George Mason	George Mason Stadium • Fairfax, VA	**L** 1–4	3,077
August 28	7:30 p.m.	Evansville	**No. 15 North Carolina**	Dorrance Field • Chapel Hill, NC	**W** 2–0	1,484
August 28	8:00 p.m.	Loyola Marymount	**SMU**	Washburne Stadium • Dallas, TX	**W** 3–1	587
August 28	8:00 p.m.	Penn State	**Syracuse**	SU Soccer Stadium • Syracuse, NY	**T** 1–1	1,716
August 28	8:30 p.m.	No. 14 Oregon State	**Notre Dame**	Alumni Stadium • Notre Dame, IN	**W** 1–0	1,127
August 28	10:00 p.m.	San Francisco	**No. 17 California**	Edwards Stadium • Berkeley, CA	**L** 1–2	328
August 28	10:30 p.m.	**No. 4 Stanford**	Santa Clara	Stevens Stadium • Santa Clara, CA	**W** 2–1	881
August 29	6:00 p.m.	FIU	**No. 8 NC State**	Dail Soccer Field • Raleigh, NC	**W** 2–0	578
August 29	6:00 p.m.	IU Indy	**Louisville**	Lynn Stadium • Louisville, KY	**W** 4–0	532
August 29	6:00 p.m.	UAB	**No. 6 Clemson**	Riggs Field • Clemson, SC	**W** 6–0	3,422
August 29	7:00 p.m.	**Boston College**	Providence	Chapey Field • Providence, RI	**L** 0–2	856
August 29	7:15 p.m.	**No. 12 Virginia Tech**	No. 2 Marshall	Veterans Memorial Soccer Complex • Huntington, WV	**T** 2–2	2,518
August 29	7:30 p.m.	**No. 3 Pittsburgh**	Georgetown	Shaw Field • Washington, D.C.	**L** 0–1	1,115
August 31	6:00 p.m.	**No. 9 Duke**	Furman	Stone Stadium • Greenville, SC	**T** 1–1	2,828
August 31	7:00 p.m.	Oral Roberts	**SMU**	Washburne Stadium • Dallas, TX	**W** 2–1	1,262
August 31	7:00 p.m.	St. John's	**No. 5 Wake Forest**	Spry Stadium • Winston-Salem, NC	**T** 0–0	1,872
August 31	10:00 p.m.	UC Davis	**No. 4 Stanford**	Cagan Stadium • Stanford, CA	**W** 1–0	1,211
August 31	10:00 p.m.	UC San Diego	**No. 17 California**	Edwards Stadium • Berkeley, CA	**T** 1–1	603
September 1	4:00 p.m.	**Syracuse**	Yale	Reese Stadium • New Haven, CT	**W** 1–0	688
September 1	6:00 p.m.	College of Charleston	**No. 15 North Carolina**	Dorrance Field • Chapel Hill, NC	**L** 0–2	672
September 1	7:00 p.m.	American	**No. 11 Virginia**	Klöckner Stadium • Charlottesville, VA	**W** 1–0	845

Players of the Week

Offensive		Defensive	
Player	Team	Player	Team
Ransford Gyan	Clemson	Mitch Ferguson	Notre Dame

=== Week 3 (Sep. 2 – Sep. 8) ===
Date	Time (ET)	Visiting team	Home team	Site	Result	Attendance
September 2	5:30 p.m.	Northeastern	**Boston College**	Newton Soccer Complex • Chestnut Hill, MA	**W** 1–0	312
September 4	7:00 p.m.	**SMU**	Grand Canyon	GCU Stadium • Phoenix, AZ	**W** 1–0	1,278
September 5	11:00 a.m.	**No. 1 Stanford**	**Louisville**	Lynn Stadium • Louisville, KY	**LOU** 1–0	375
September 5	6:00 p.m.	**North Carolina**	**No. 5 NC State**	Dail Soccer Field • Raleigh, NC	**T** 0–0	5,083
September 5	6:00 p.m.	**No. 10 Pittsburgh**	**No. 3 Clemson**	Riggs Field • Clemson, SC	**CLEM** 3–2	2,184
September 5	7:00 p.m.	**No. 14 Duke**	Georgetown	Shaw Field • Washington, D.C.	**T** 2–2	2,210
September 5	7:00 p.m.	Duquesne	**Syracuse**	SU Soccer Stadium • Syracuse, NY	**L** 0–1	1,913
September 5	7:00 p.m.	Lipscomb	**No. 7 Wake Forest**	Spry Stadium • Winston-Salem, NC	**W** 4–0	1,233
September 5	7:00 p.m.	**Virginia**	**No. 8 Virginia Tech**	Thompson Field • Blacksburg, VA	**T** 2–2	2,438
September 7	4:00 p.m.	**California**	**Boston College**	Newton Soccer Complex • Chestnut Hill, MA	**CAL** 2–0	362
September 7	7:30 p.m.	Indiana	**Notre Dame**	Alumni Stadium • Notre Dame, IN	**L** 0–1	1,883
September 8	7:00 p.m.	Butler	**No. 10 Pittsburgh**	Ambrose Urbanic Field • Pittsburgh, PA	**W** 4–1	436
September 8	7:00 p.m.	New Haven	**Syracuse**	SU Soccer Stadium • Syracuse, NY	**T** 0–0	648
September 8	8:00 p.m.	Incarnate Word	**SMU**	Washburne Stadium • Dallas, TX	**L** 1–2	728

Players of the Week

Offensive		Defensive	
Player	Team	Player	Team
Ransford Gyan (2)	Clemson	Alex Svetanoff	Louisville

=== Week 4 (Sep. 9 – Sep. 15) ===
Date	Time (ET)	Visiting team	Home team	Site	Result	Attendance
September 9	5:00 p.m.	Furman	**No. 14 Virginia Tech**	Thompson Field • Blacksburg, VA	**T** 0–0	774
September 9	6:00 p.m.	Campbell	**No. 4 Wake Forest**	Spry Stadium • Winston-Salem, NC	**W** 1–0	750
September 9	6:00 p.m.	VCU	**No. 2 Clemson**	Riggs Field • Clemson, SC	**L** 1–2	1
September 9	7:00 p.m.	**No. 6 Louisville**	Ohio State	Jesse Owens Memorial Stadium • Columbus, OH	**W** 1–0	940
September 9	10:00 p.m.	Saint Mary's	**No. 8 Stanford**	Cagan Stadium • Stanford, CA	**W** 3–1	630
September 10	4:00 p.m.	Dean College	**Boston College**	Newton Soccer Complex • Chestnut Hill, MA	**W** 14–0	167
September 10	6:00 p.m.	**California**	Harvard	Jordan Field • Boston, MA	**L** 1–3	384
September 10	6:00 p.m.	Stetson	**No. 5 NC State**	Dail Soccer Field • Raleigh, NC	**W** 4–0	325
September 12	7:00 p.m.	**Notre Dame**	**Pittsburgh**	Ambrose Urbanic Field • Pittsburgh, PA	**ND** 2–0	2,000
September 12	7:00 p.m.	**No. 4 Wake Forest**	**No. 21 North Carolina**	Dorrance Field • Chapel Hill, NC	**T** 1–1	2,280
September 13	6:00 p.m.	Florida Atlantic	**No. 5 NC State**	Dail Soccer Field • Raleigh, NC	**W** 2–0	981
September 13	6:00 p.m.	**Virginia**	**No. 6 Louisville**	Lynn Stadium • Louisville, KY	**UVA** 1–0	917
September 13	7:00 p.m.	**No. 8 Stanford**	**Syracuse**	SU Soccer Stadium • Syracuse, NY	**STAN** 3–2	2,224
September 13	8:00 p.m.	**No. 2 Clemson**	**SMU**	Washburne Stadium • Dallas, TX	**T** 1–1	2,093
September 14	5:00 p.m.	**No. 19 Duke**	**California**	Edwards Stadium • Berkeley, CA	**T** 1–1	738
September 14	6:00 p.m.	**Boston College**	**No. 14 Virginia Tech**	Thompson Field • Blacksburg, VA	**BC** 1–0	889
September 15	7:00 p.m.	Incarnate Word	**Pittsburgh**	Ambrose Urbanic Field • Pittsburgh, PA	**T** 0–0	400

Players of the Week

Offensive		Defensive	
Player	Team	Player	Team
Trevor Islam	Stanford	Andrej Borak	Boston College
Luke Burns	Virginia	Casper Mols	Virginia

=== Week 5 (Sep. 16 – Sep. 22) ===
Date	Time (ET)	Visiting team	Home team	Site	Result	Attendance
September 16	6:00 p.m.	Queens	**No. 14 Clemson**	Riggs Field • Clemson, SC	**L** 0–1	877
September 16	6:00 p.m.	William & Mary	**No. 2 NC State**	Dail Soccer Field • Raleigh, NC	**W** 7–0	474
September 16	7:00 p.m.	Memphis	**North Carolina**	Dorrance Field • Chapel Hill, NC	**W** 3–0	503
September 16	7:00 p.m.	Omaha	**Notre Dame**	Alumni Stadium • Notre Dame, IN	**W** 3–1	353
September 16	7:00 p.m.	UNC Wilmington	**No. 1 Wake Forest**	Spry Stadium • Winston-Salem, NC	**T** 3–3	814
September 17	10:00 p.m.	**No. 3 Stanford**	San Jose State	Spartan Soccer Complex • San Jose, CA	**T** 2–2	2,489
September 19	6:00 p.m.	**California**	**No. 14 Clemson**	Riggs Field • Clemson, SC	**CLEM** 3–1	3,110
September 19	7:00 p.m.	**No. 12 Louisville**	**Notre Dame**	Alumni Stadium • Notre Dame, IN	**ND** 3–0	2,643
September 19	7:00 p.m.	**No. 2 NC State**	**Boston College**	Newton Soccer Complex • Chestnut Hill, MA	**NCST** 2–0	1,053
September 19	7:00 p.m.	**Pittsburgh**	Maryland	Ludwig Field • College Park, MD	**L** 1–2	2,754
September 19	7:00 p.m.	**Syracuse**	**No. 19 Duke**	Koskinen Stadium • Durham, NC	**DUKE** 2–0	1,101
September 19	7:30 p.m.	**No. 1 Wake Forest**	**Virginia**	Klöckner Stadium • Charlottesville, VA	**UVA** 6–3	2,161
September 20	8:00 p.m.	**SMU**	**North Carolina**	Dorrance Field • Chapel Hill, NC	**T** 1–1	1,521
September 21	10:00 p.m.	**Virginia Tech**	**No. 3 Stanford**	Cagan Stadium • Stanford, CA	**STAN** 3–1	1,616
September 22	7:00 p.m.	Liberty	**No. 1 Wake Forest**	Spry Stadium • Winston-Salem, NC	**W** 7–0	850
September 22	7:00 p.m.	Mercyhurst	**Pittsburgh**	Ambrose Urbanic Field • Pittsburgh, PA	**W** 2–1	482

Players of the Week

Offensive		Defensive	
Player	Team	Player	Team
Donavan Phillip	NC State	Logan Erb	NC State

=== Week 6 (Sep. 23 – Sep. 29) ===
Date	Time (ET)	Visiting team	Home team	Site	Result	Attendance
September 23	6:00 p.m.	**California**	UNC Asheville	Greenwood Soccer Field • Asheville, NC	**W** 1–0	375
September 23	7:00 p.m.	Boston University	**Boston College**	Newton Soccer Complex • Chestnut Hill, MA	**W** 2–1	274
September 23	7:00 p.m.	Colgate	**Syracuse**	SU Soccer Stadium • Syracuse, NY	**W** 3–0	522
September 23	7:00 p.m.	Dayton	**No. 12 Virginia**	Klöckner Stadium • Charlottesville, VA	Canceled	
September 23	7:00 p.m.	Howard	**No. 16 Duke**	Koskinen Stadium • Durham, NC	**W** 8–0	291
September 23	7:00 p.m.	No. 18 Kentucky	**Louisville**	Lynn Stadium • Louisville, KY	**T** 1–1	1,850
September 23	7:00 p.m.	Wright State	**No. 21 Notre Dame**	Alumni Stadium • Notre Dame, IN	**W** 3–2	210
September 24	10:00 p.m.	Oregon State	**No. 6 Stanford**	Cagan Stadium • Stanford, CA	**W** 3–2	879
September 26	7:00 p.m.	**Clemson**	**No. 13 Wake Forest**	Spry Stadium • Winston-Salem, NC	**CLEM** 4–3	2,186
September 26	7:00 p.m.	**Louisville**	**No. 16 Duke**	Koskinen Stadium • Durham, NC	**DUKE** 1–0	712
September 26	7:00 p.m.	**No. 1 NC State**	**Pittsburgh**	Ambrose Urbanic Field • Pittsburgh, PA	**T** 1–1	1,360
September 27	6:00 p.m.	**Syracuse**	**California**	Edwards Stadium • Berkeley, CA	**CUSE** 2–0	541
September 27	7:00 p.m.	**North Carolina**	**No. 12 Virginia**	Klöckner Stadium • Charlottesville, VA	**T** 0–0	902
September 27	7:00 p.m.	**SMU**	**No. 21 Notre Dame**	Alumni Stadium • Notre Dame, IN	**SMU** 2–0	833
September 28	10:00 p.m.	**Boston College**	**No. 6 Stanford**	Cagan Stadium • Stanford, CA	**STAN** 3–0	1,379
September 29	7:00 p.m.	**Virginia Tech**	East Tennessee State	Summers-Taylor Stadium • Johnson City, TN	**W** 1–0	430

Players of the Week

Offensive		Defensive	
Player	Team	Player	Team
Nathan Richmond	Clemson	Slade Starnes	SMU

=== Week 7 (Sep. 30 – Oct. 6) ===
Date	Time (ET)	Visiting team	Home team	Site	Result	Attendance
September 30	7:00 p.m.	Averett	No. 9 Duke	Koskinen Stadium • Durham, NC	**W** 10–0	174
September 30	7:00 p.m.	Hope	No. 23 Notre Dame	Alumni Stadium • Notre Dame, IN	**W** 3–2	264
October 1	7:00 p.m.	Milwaukee	No. 16 Virginia	Klöckner Stadium • Charlottesville, VA	**W** 3–2	780
October 1	7:00 p.m.	UNC Wilmington	No. 2 NC State	Dail Soccer Field • Raleigh, NC	**W** 3–0	2,463
October 3	6:00 p.m.	**California**	SMU	Washburne Stadium • Dallas, TX	**SMU** 4–0	1,660
October 3	6:00 p.m.	**North Carolina**	Louisville	Lynn Stadium • Louisville, KY	**UNC** 1–0	1,222
October 3	7:00 p.m.	**Boston College**	Syracuse	SU Soccer Stadium • Syracuse, NY	**CUSE** 1–0	1,544
October 3	7:00 p.m.	**Pittsburgh**	No. 9 Duke	Koskinen Stadium • Durham, NC	**DUKE** 4–0	708
October 3	8:30 p.m.	**Virginia Tech**	No. 23 Notre Dame	Alumni Stadium • Notre Dame, IN	**T** 1–1	2,742
October 4	7:00 p.m.	Elon	Clemson	Riggs Field • Clemson, SC	**W** 1–0	877
October 4	7:00 p.m.	**No. 3 Stanford**	Wake Forest	Spry Stadium • Winston-Salem, NC	**STAN** 2–0	2,060
October 5	6:00 p.m.	**No. 16 Virginia**	No. 2 NC State	Dail Soccer Field • Raleigh, NC	**UVA** 1–0	2,989

Players of the Week

Offensive		Defensive	
Player	Team	Player	Team
Stephan Soghomonian	SMU	Casper Mols (2)	Virginia

=== Week 8 (Oct. 7 – Oct. 13) ===
Date	Time (ET)	Visiting team	Home team	Site	Result	Attendance
October 7	6:00 p.m.	Belmont	**Louisville**	Lynn Stadium • Louisville, KY	**T** 0–0	684
October 7	6:00 p.m.	Longwood	**Virginia Tech**	Thompson Field • Blacksburg, VA	**W** 3–0	167
October 7	7:00 p.m.	Elon	**No. 7 Duke**	Koskinen Stadium • Durham, NC	**T** 1–1	414
October 7	7:00 p.m.	Green Bay	**Notre Dame**	Alumni Stadium • Notre Dame, IN	**W** 4–2	264
October 7	7:00 p.m.	**North Carolina**	Lipscomb	Lipscomb Soccer Complex • Nashville, TN	**W** 3–0	472
October 7	8:00 p.m.	UT Rio Grande Valley	**No. 25 SMU**	Washburne Stadium • Dallas, TX	Cancelled	
October 10	6:00 p.m.	**Clemson**	**No. 10 NC State**	Dail Soccer Field • Raleigh, NC	**NCST** 1–0	2,098
October 10	7:00 p.m.	**No. 7 Duke**	**Boston College**	Newton Soccer Complex • Chestnut Hill, MA	**T** 0–0	1,027
October 10	7:00 p.m.	**Notre Dame**	**No. 8 Virginia**	Klöckner Stadium • Charlottesville, VA	**T** 1–1	1,756
October 11	5:00 p.m.	**Louisville**	**Virginia Tech**	Thompson Field • Blacksburg, VA	**VT** 2–0	1,032
October 11	6:00 p.m.	St. Thomas	**North Carolina**	Dorrance Field • Chapel Hill, NC	**W** 4–0	1,539
October 11	6:00 p.m.	**Wake Forest**	**California**	Edwards Stadium • Berkeley, CA	**WAKE** 2–1	336
October 11	8:00 p.m.	**No. 25 SMU**	**Syracuse**	SU Soccer Stadium • Syracuse, NY	**CUSE** 2–0	988
October 11	9:00 p.m.	**Pittsburgh**	**No. 1 Stanford**	Cagan Stadium • Stanford, CA	**STAN** 2–0	1,880

Players of the Week

Offensive		Defensive	
Player	Team	Player	Team
Dagur Traustason	Virginia Tech	Andrej Borak (2)	Boston College

=== Week 9 (Oct. 14 – Oct. 20) ===
Date	Time (ET)	Visiting team	Home team	Site	Result	Attendance
October 14	5:30 p.m.	American International	Boston College	Newton Soccer Complex • Chestnut Hill, MA	**W** 5–0	153
October 14	7:00 p.m.	Denver	Pittsburgh	Ambrose Urbanic Field • Pittsburgh, PA	**T** 0–0	595
October 14	7:00 p.m.	No. 19 UNC Greensboro	No. 9 Virginia	Klöckner Stadium • Charlottesville, VA	**T** 1–1	604
October 14	8:00 p.m.	Central Arkansas	SMU	Washburne Stadium • Dallas, TX	**W** 2–0	647
October 15	7:00 p.m.	UAB	No. 17 North Carolina	Dorrance Field • Chapel Hill, NC	**L** 1–2	589
October 17	7:00 p.m.	**Louisville**	Wake Forest	Spry Stadium • Winston-Salem, NC	**T** 1–1	1,208
October 17	7:00 p.m.	**No. 6 NC State**	Notre Dame	Alumni Stadium • Notre Dame, IN	**NCST** 3–0	1,579
October 17	8:00 p.m.	**No. 10 Duke**	Clemson	Riggs Field • Clemson, SC	**CLEM** 3–0	3,629
October 18	7:00 p.m.	**Boston College**	SMU	Washburne Stadium • Dallas, TX	**SMU** 3–2	860
October 18	7:00 p.m.	**Syracuse**	Pittsburgh	Ambrose Urbanic Field • Pittsburgh, PA	**PITT** 4–2	767
October 19	5:00 p.m.	Denver	No. 9 Virginia	Klöckner Stadium • Charlottesville, VA	**W** 2–1	706
October 19	5:00 p.m.	**Virginia Tech**	No. 17 North Carolina	Dorrance Field • Chapel Hill, NC	**UNC** 3–0	1,939

Players of the Week

Offensive		Defensive	
Player	Team	Player	Team
Stephan Soghomonian (2)	SMU	Kwaku Agyabeng	Clemson

=== Week 10 (Oct. 21 – Oct. 27) ===
Date	Time (ET)	Visiting team	Home team	Site	Result	Attendance
October 21	6:00 p.m.	No. 18 UNC Greensboro	**No. 3 NC State**	Dail Soccer Field • Raleigh, NC	**T** 1–1	1,140
October 21	6:00 p.m.	UNC Wilmington	**Clemson**	Riggs Field • Clemson, SC	**W** 6–0	1,531
October 21	7:00 p.m.	**Notre Dame**	Northern Illinois	NIU Soccer Complex • DeKalb, IL	**L** 1–2	711
October 21	7:00 p.m.	Queens	**No. 19 Duke**	Koskinen Stadium • Durham, NC	**T** 0–0	162
October 21	7:00 p.m.	**Syracuse**	Cornell	Berman Field • Ithaca, NY	**L** 1–2	750
October 21	7:00 p.m.	Wofford	**Wake Forest**	Spry Stadium • Winston-Salem, NC	**T** 2–2	683
October 21	8:00 p.m.	**Louisville**	Lipscomb	Lipscomb Soccer Complex • Nashville, TN	**T** 1–1	317
October 22	6:00 p.m.	Winthrop	**Virginia Tech**	Thompson Field • Blacksburg, VA	**W** 2–0	887
October 22	7:00 p.m.	**California**	Radford	Patrick D. Cupp Stadium • Radford, VA	**W** 6–1	142
October 22	9:00 p.m.	San Francisco	**No. 1 Stanford**	Cagan Stadium • Stanford, CA	**W** 1–0	939
October 24	7:00 p.m.	**Notre Dame**	**Boston College**	Newton Soccer Complex • Chestnut Hill, MA	**ND** 1–0	459
October 24	7:00 p.m.	**Wake Forest**	**Pittsburgh**	Ambrose Urbanic Field • Pittsburgh, PA	**T** 1–1	817
October 25	3:00 p.m.	**No. 22 North Carolina**	**Syracuse**	SU Soccer Stadium • Syracuse, NY	**CUSE** 1–0	1,043
October 25	6:00 p.m.	**Clemson**	**No. 11 Virginia**	Klöckner Stadium • Charlottesville, VA	**UVA** 4–0	1,267
October 25	7:00 p.m.	**No. 3 NC State**	**No. 19 Duke**	Koskinen Stadium • Durham, NC	**NSCT** 2–0	1,854
October 26	6:00 p.m.	**California**	**Virginia Tech**	Thompson Field • Blacksburg, VA	**VT** 3–2	1,527
October 26	9:00 p.m.	**SMU**	**No. 1 Stanford**	Cagan Stadium • Stanford, CA	**T** 0–0	1,873
October 27	6:00 p.m.	**Louisville**	Evansville	McCutchan Stadium • Evansville, IN	**L** 1–3	754

Players of the Week

Offensive		Defensive	
Player	Team	Player	Team
Nicholas Simmonds	Virginia	Slade Starnes (2)	SMU
Declan Quill	Virginia Tech	Slade Starnes (2)	SMU

=== Week 11 (Oct. 28 – Nov. 4) ===
Date	Time (ET)	Visiting team	Home team	Site	Result	Attendance
October 31	5:00 p.m.	**No. 1 Stanford**	California	Edwards Stadium • Berkeley, CA	**CAL** 1–0	411
October 31	6:00 p.m.	**Pittsburgh**	Louisville	Lynn Stadium • Louisville, KY	**T** 0–0	354
October 31	6:00 p.m.	**Syracuse**	No. 4 NC State	Dail Soccer Field • Raleigh, NC	**T** 1–1	752
October 31	7:00 p.m.	Saint Joseph's	Boston College	Newton Soccer Complex • Chestnut Hill, MA	**W** 2–1	228
October 31	7:00 p.m.	**Notre Dame**	Wake Forest	Spry Stadium • Winston-Salem, NC	**WAKE** 3–0	740
October 31	7:00 p.m.	**No. 6 Virginia**	SMU	Washburne Stadium • Dallas, TX	**UVA** 1–0	803
October 31	7:00 p.m.	**Virginia Tech**	Clemson	Riggs Field • Clemson, SC	**T** 3–3	1,721
October 31	8:00 p.m.	**Duke**	North Carolina	Dorrance Field • Chapel Hill, NC	**DUKE** 2–0	1,509

Players of the Week

Offensive		Defensive	
Player	Team	Player	Team
Junhwan Park	California	D'Andre Pickett	California
Declan Quill (2)	Virginia Tech	D'Andre Pickett	California

== Rankings ==
Legend
Increase in ranking
Decrease in ranking
Not ranked previous week

		Pre	Wk 1	Wk 2	Wk 3	Wk 4	Wk 5	Wk 6	Wk 7	Wk 8	Wk 9	Wk 10	Wk 11	Wk 12	Wk 13	Wk 14	Wk 15	Final
Boston College	USC														Not released			
Boston College	TDS																	
Boston College	CSN															Not released		
California	USC		17												Not released			
California	TDS																	
California	CSN		RV	RV	RV											Not released		
Clemson	USC	9	6	3	2	14		RV			RV		RV		Not released			
Clemson	TDS	11	7	2	1	6	17	10	9	13	10	18						
Clemson	CSN	7	7	4	1	6	8	14	15	16	15	20	24	RV	RV	Not released		
Duke	USC	15	9	14	19	19	16	9	7	10	19		RV		Not released			RV
Duke	TDS	15	8	8	11	21	16	9	6	4	15					15	15	15
Duke	CSN	13	10	10	10	15	17	13	10	11	17	24	RV	RV	RV	Not released		
Louisville	USC			RV	6	12									Not released			
Louisville	TDS				4	12	22											
Louisville	CSN			RV	21	17	24									Not released		
North Carolina	USC	RV	15	RV	21	RV		RV	RV	17	22				Not released			RV
North Carolina	TDS									22	25							
North Carolina	CSN	RV	21	23	RV	RV	RV	RV	RV	20	22	RV		RV		Not released		
NC State	USC	14	8	5	5	2	1 (7)	2	10	6	3	4	5	11	Not released			2
NC State	TDS	19	13	11	15	2	1	1	5	3	3	4	6	12	13	7	5	2
NC State	CSN	16	12	8	7	1	1	1	3	4	4	2	5	7	10	Not released		
Notre Dame	USC					RV	21	23	RV						Not released			
Notre Dame	TDS																	
Notre Dame	CSN	RV	RV	RV	RV	RV	23	24	RV	RV	RV					Not released		
Pittsburgh	USC	7	3	10											Not released			
Pittsburgh	TDS	5	4	12	21													
Pittsburgh	CSN	5	3	7	9	22	RV									Not released		
SMU	USC	5	RV					RV	25					25	Not released			15
SMU	TDS	7	19	20	18									15	8	20	20	20
SMU	CSN	6	11	RV	RV			RV	RV	RV	RV	RV		RV	14	Not released		
Stanford	USC	13	4	1 (8)	8	3	6	3	1 (8)	1 (8)	1 (8)	1 (8)	7	8	Not released			9
Stanford	TDS	10	3	1	7	4	6	2	2	6	2	5	11	18	19	9	12	12
Stanford	CSN	10	6	2	4	7	5	2	2	1	1	1	6	8	9	Not released		
Syracuse	USC													RV	Not released			
Syracuse	TDS													20				
Syracuse	CSN													RV		Not released		
Virginia	USC	17	11	RV	RV	RV	12	16	8	9	11	6	4	4	Not released			11
Virginia	TDS	17	11	24	24	7	3	8	3	2	5	2	2	2	9	21	21	21
Virginia	CSN	RV	20	RV	RV	25	20	12	6	6	6	5	3	3	3	Not released		
Virginia Tech	USC		12	8	14	RV									Not released			
Virginia Tech	TDS		16	7	5	17												
Virginia Tech	CSN		RV	11	12	21	RV									Not released		
Wake Forest	USC	6	5	7	4	1 (6)	13								Not released			
Wake Forest	TDS	2	2	6	3	1	7	14										
Wake Forest	CSN	4	4	6	6	5	11	23	RV		RV	RV	RV	RV		Not released		

== Postseason ==
=== ACC Tournament ===
Semifinals
1	Virginia	2
12	California	1
6	Syracuse	1
7	SMU	5

Final
1	Virginia	0
7	SMU	1

=== NCAA tournament ===
Seed	School	First round	2nd Round	3rd Round	Quarterfinals	Semifinals	Championship
2	Virginia	BYE	T 2–2 (3–4 PKs) vs. UNC Greensboro – (Charlottesville)				
5	SMU	BYE	L 0–1 vs. Washington – (University Park)				
12	Stanford	BYE	W 1–0 vs. Kansas City – (Stanford)	L 0–1 vs. Washington – (Stanford)			
15	NC State	BYE	W 2–0 vs. Marshall – (Raleigh)	W 2–0 vs. UNC Greensboro – (Raleigh)	W 3–2 @ (7) Georgetown – (Washington)	W 2–1 vs. Saint Louis – (Cary)	L 2–3 vs. Washington – (Cary)
	Clemson	L 0–1 vs. Western Michigan – (Clemson)					
	Duke	W 1–0 vs. Fairleigh Dickinson – (Durham)	W 1–0 @ (3) Princeton – (Princeton)	L 0–2 @ (14) Akron – (Akron)			
	North Carolina	T 2–2 (6–5 PKs) vs. North Florida – (Chapel Hill)	T 1–1 (3–4 PKs) @ (4) Maryland – (College Park)				
	Notre Dame	W 1–0 @ Michigan – (Ann Arbor)	L 0–1 @ (14) Akron – (Akron)				
	Syracuse	L 0–2 vs. Hofstra – (Syracuse)					
	W–L (%):	2–2–1 (.500)	3–2–2 (.571)	1–2–0 (.333)	1–0–0 (1.000)	1–0–0 (1.000)	0–1–0 (.000) Total: 8–7–3 (.528)

=== Awards ===
==== All-ACC awards and teams ====
2025 ACC Men's Soccer Individual Awards
Award	Recipient(s)
Coach of the Year	George Gelnovatch – Virginia
Offensive Player of the Year	Donavan Phillip – NC State
Midfielder of the Year	Ransford Gyan – Clemson
Defensive Player of the Year	Nikola Marković – NC State
Goalkeeper of the Year	Logan Erb – NC State
Freshman of the Year	Nicholas Simmonds – Virginia

2025 ACC Men's Soccer All-Conference Teams
First Team	Second Team	Third Team	All-Freshman Team
Ransford Gyan – Clemson; Kenan Hot – Duke; Logan Erb – NC State; Taig Healy – NC State; Nikola Marković – NC State; Donavan Phillip – NC State; Arnau Vilamitjana – Pittsburgh; Fletcher Bank – Stanford; Zach Bohane – Stanford; Nicholas Simmonds – Virginia; Cooper Flax – Wake Forest	Wahabu Musah – Clemson; Nathan Richmond – Clemson; Kamran Acito – Duke; Ulfur Bjornsson – Duke; Dylan Kropp – North Carolina; Luca Nikolai – North Carolina; Stephan Soghomonian – SMU; Slade Starnes – SMU; Nick Dang – Virginia; Casper Mols – Virginia; Umberto Pelà – Virginia	Luka Lukic – California; Kwaku Agyabeng – Clemson; Misei Yoshizawa – Clemson; Drew Kerr – Duke; Jack Sandmeyer – North Carolina; Calem Tommy – NC State; Wyatt Lewis – Notre Dame; Nolan Spicer – Notre Dame; Charles-Emile Brunet – SMU; Tomas Hut – Syracuse; Sebastian Pop – Virginia	Andrej Borak – Boston College; Kwaku Agyabeng – Clemson; Max Simpson – Duke; Immanuel Mathe – North Carolina; Riley Moloney – NC State; Joshua Partal – Stanford; Jack Pymm – Stanford; Landon Darko – Syracuse; Zach Ehrenpreis – Virginia; Nicholas Simmonds – Virginia; Dagur Traustason – Virginia Tech

=== All-Americans ===
2025 United Soccer Coaches All-Americans
First Team	Second Team	Third Team
Nikola Marković – NC State; Ransford Gyan – Clemson; Donavan Phillip – NC State; Nicholas Simmonds – Virginia	Logan Erb – NC State; Slade Starnes – SMU; Cooper Flax – Wake Forest; Umberto Pelà – Virginia	None

== MLS SuperDraft ==
=== Total picks by school ===
Team	Round 1	Round 2	Round 3	Total
Boston College	–	–	–	–
California	–	–	–	–
Clemson	4	–	–	4
Duke	–	1	–	1
Louisville	–	–	1	1
NC State	2	1	1	4
North Carolina	2	–	1	3
Notre Dame	–	–	1	1
Pittsburgh	–	2	–	2
Stanford	1	1	–	2
SMU	1	–	1	2
Syracuse	1	–	–	1
Virginia	1	1	–	2
Virginia Tech	–	–	–	–
Wake Forest	1	–	1	2
Total	13	6	6	25

=== List of selections ===
Round	Pick #	MLS team	Player	Position	College
1	1	D.C. United	Nikola Marković (Canada)	DF	NC State
1	3	FC Dallas	Nicholas Simmonds (United States)	FW	Virginia
1	4	Sporting Kansas City	Kwaku Agyabeng (Ghana)	MF	Clemson
1	5	Orlando City SC	Harvey Sarajian (United States)	FW	Wake Forest
1	13	Real Salt Lake	Lukas Magnason (Iceland)	DF	Clemson
1	15	Portland Timbers	Justin McLean (United States)	FW	NC State
1	18	Chicago Fire FC	Jack Sandmeyer (United States)	MF	North Carolina
1	21	New York Red Bulls	Tomas Hut (United States)	GK	Syracuse
1	22	Charlotte FC	Will Cleary (United States)	DF	Stanford
1	23	Minnesota United FC	Jaylinn Mitchell (United States)	FW	SMU
1	23	Real Salt Lake	Dylan Kropp (United States)	DF	North Carolina
1	26	Colorado Rapids	Wahabu Musah (Ghana)	FW	Clemson
1	27	New York City FC	Ransford Gyan (Ghana)	MF	Clemson
2	32	Inter Miami CF	Kenan Hot (United States)	MF	Duke
2	35	LA Galaxy	Palmer Bank (United States)	DF	Stanford
2	36	Toronto FC	Jackson Gilman (United States)	DF	Pittsburgh
2	39	Houston Dynamo FC	Calem Tommy (South Africa)	DF	NC State
2	44	FC Dallas	Umberto Pelà (Italy)	MF	Virginia
2	48	Real Salt Lake	Niklas Soerensen (Switzerland)	DF	Pittsburgh
3	63	CF Montréal	Tate Lorentz (United States)	MF	Wake Forest
3	66	FC Dallas	Olayinka Ogunleye (United States)	DF	Louisville
3	74	Orlando City SC	Mitch Ferguson (United States)	DF	Notre Dame
3	79	Columbus Crew	Isaac Heffess (United States)	DF	NC State
3	80	Nashville SC	Charles-Emile Brunet (Canada)	MF	SMU
3	87	New York City FC	Luca Nikolai (Germany)	DF	North Carolina

== Homegrown players ==
The Homegrown Player Rule is a Major League Soccer program that allows MLS teams to sign local players from their own development academies directly to MLS first team rosters. Before the creation of the rule in 2008, every player entering Major League Soccer had to be assigned through one of the existing MLS player allocation processes, such as the MLS SuperDraft.

To place a player on its homegrown player list, making him eligible to sign as a homegrown player, players must have resided in that club's home territory and participated in the club's youth development system for at least one year. Players can play college soccer and still be eligible to sign a homegrown contract.

Original MLS team	Player	Pos.	School	Ref.
Houston Dynamo FC	(United States) Reese Miller	DF	Virginia	
Houston Dynamo FC	(United States) Logan Erb	GK	NC State	
