= Atlantic Coast Conference Men's Soccer Player of the Year =

ACC Men's Soccer Offensive Player of the Year
- Awarded for: the most outstanding attacking male soccer player in the Atlantic Coast Conference
- Country: United States
- Presented by: Atlantic Coast Sports Media Association (1970–present); ACC head coaches (2013–present)
- First award: 1970
- Currently held by: Joschi Schelb, North Carolina

ACC Men's Soccer Defensive Player of the Year
- Awarded for: the most outstanding defensive male soccer player in the Atlantic Coast Conference
- Country: United States
- Presented by: Atlantic Coast Sports Media Association (1970–present); ACC head coaches (2013–present)
- First award: 2004
- Currently held by: Enzo Panozzo, SMU

The Atlantic Coast Conference Men's Soccer Offensive Player of the Year is an annual award given to the best attacking player in the Atlantic Coast Conference during the NCAA Division I men's soccer season. Prior to 2004, the award had been known as the Men's Soccer Player of the Year, but in 2003 the award split into the Men's Offensive and Defensive Categories. The award has been given since 1970. Notable winners of the award include current and former professionals, Henry Gutierrez, Mike Fisher, Charlie Davies, Alejandro Bedoya, Kyle Martino and Jack Harrison. The ACC Men's Soccer Offensive Player of the Year award is currently held by Matthew Roou, who won the award as a senior with Notre Dame, while the ACC Men's Soccer Defensive Player of the Year award is currently held by Casper Svendby, who won the award as a junior with Pittsburgh.

Clyde Browne has won the award more times than any other player, winning it four times from 1972 until 1976.

== Key ==
†	Co-Players of the Year
*	Awarded a national Player of the Year award: Hermann Trophy
Player (X)	Denotes the number of times the player had been awarded the ACC Player of the Year award at that point

== Winners ==
=== Player of the Year (1970–2003) ===
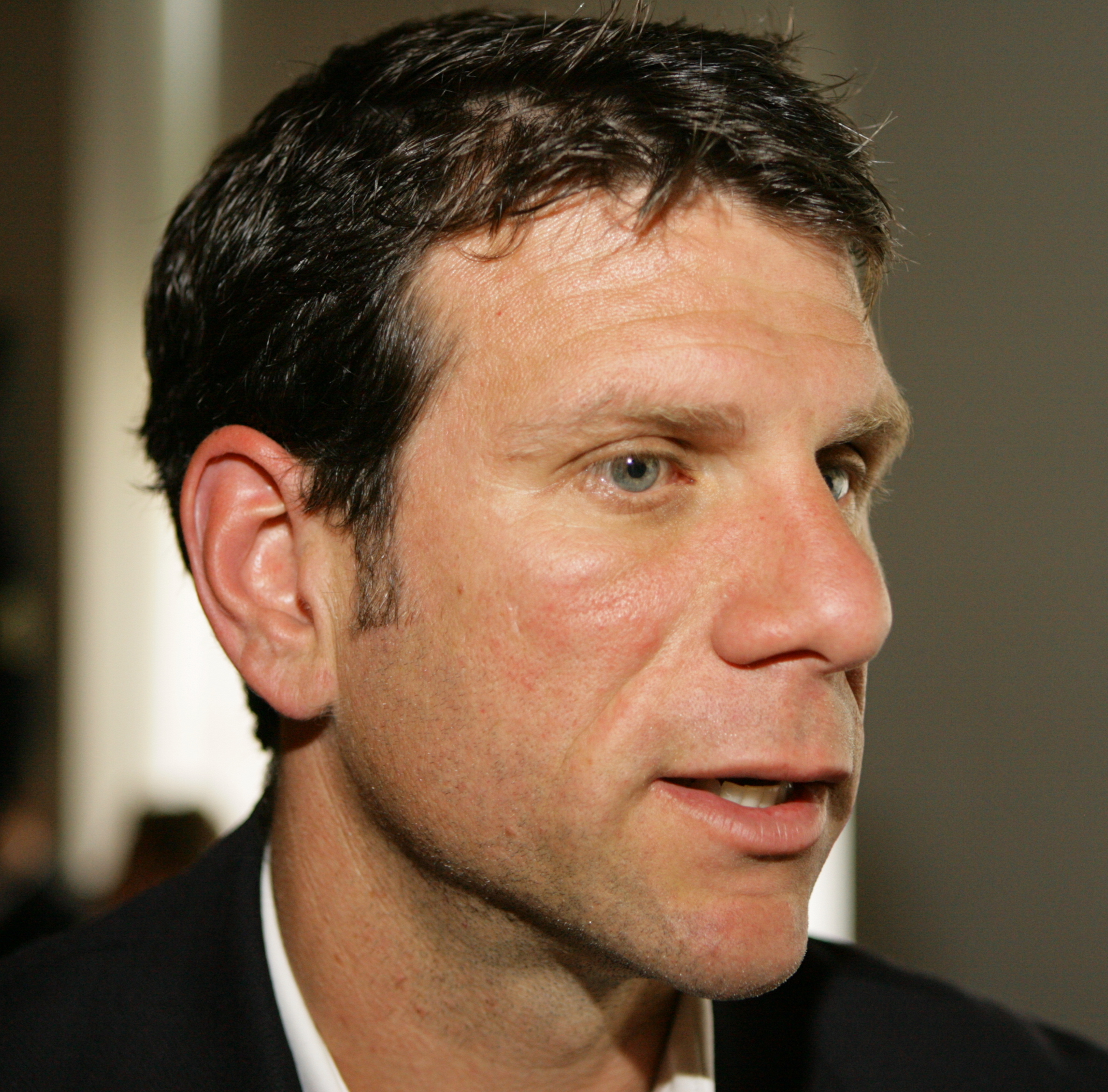
Jeff Agoos won the award in 1988, while playing for the University of Virginia.

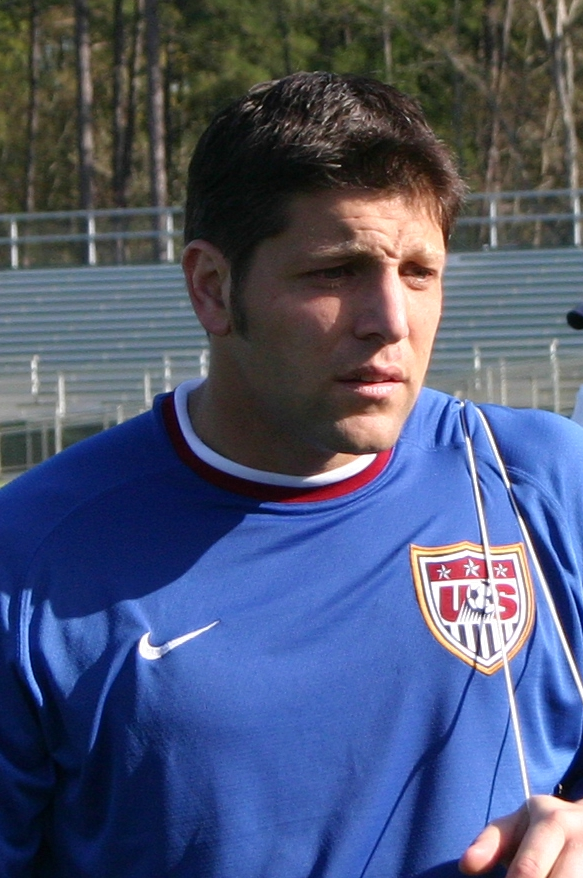
Tony Meola won the award in 1989, while playing for the University of Virginia.

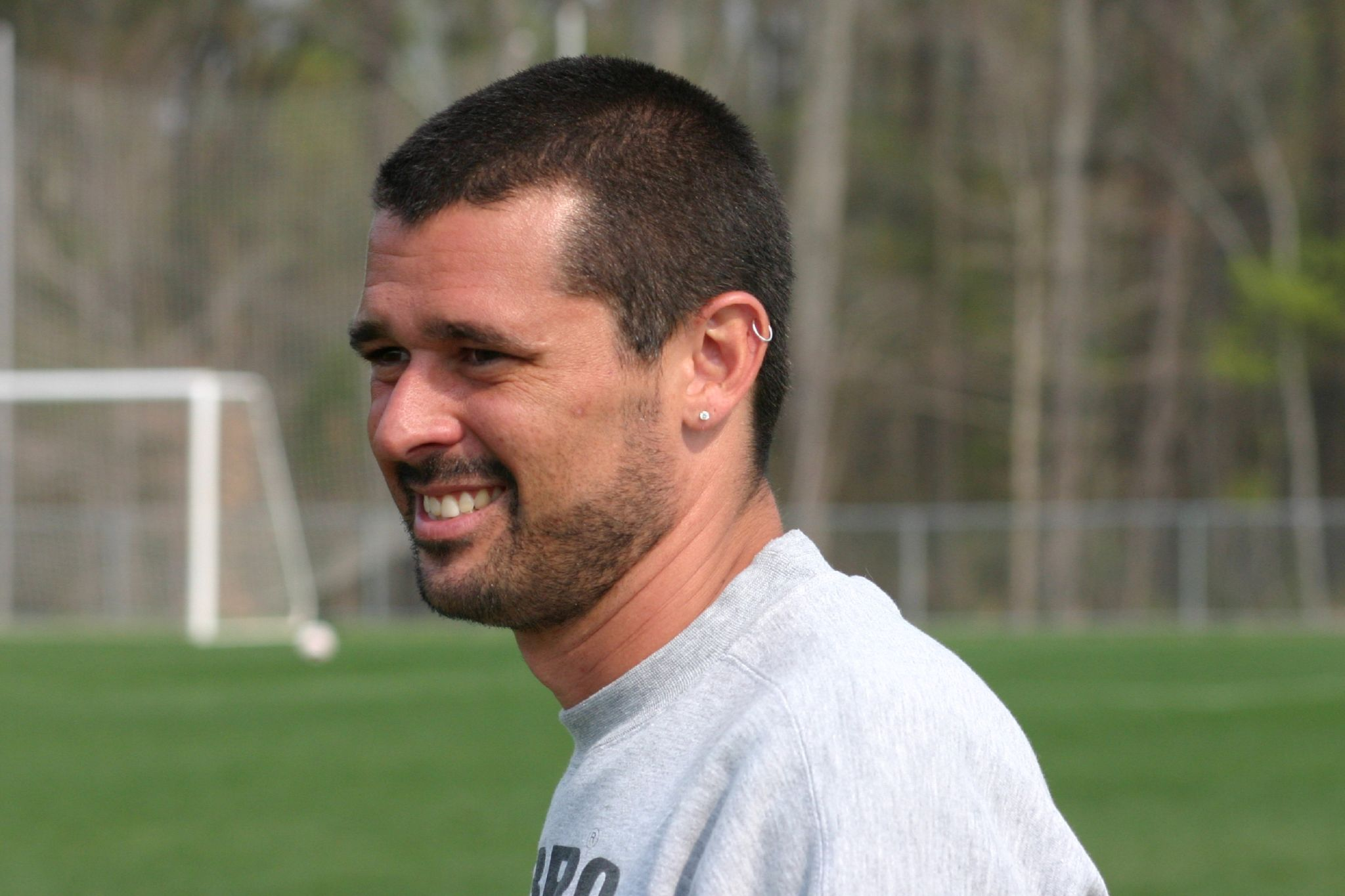
Scott Schweitzer won the award in 1992, while playing for the North Carolina State University.

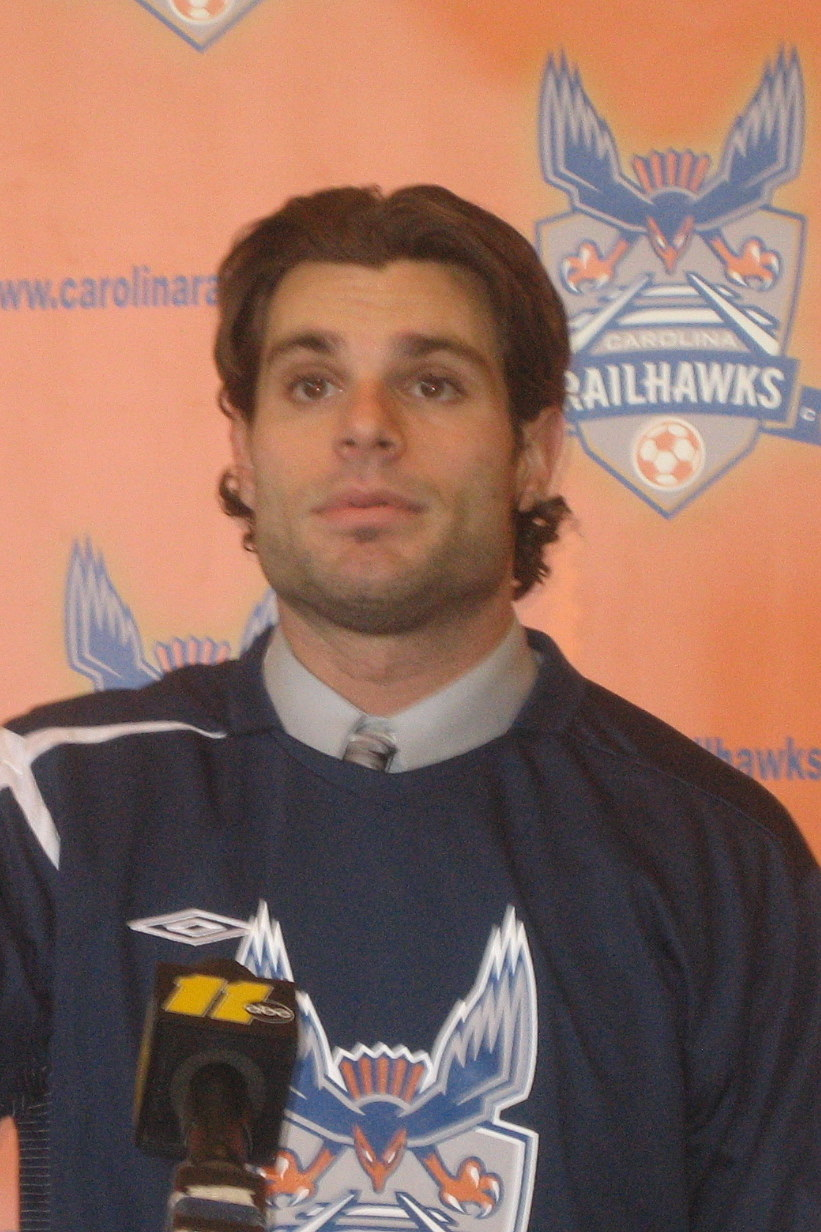
Chris Carrieri won the award in 2000, while playing for the University of North Carolina at Chapel Hill.

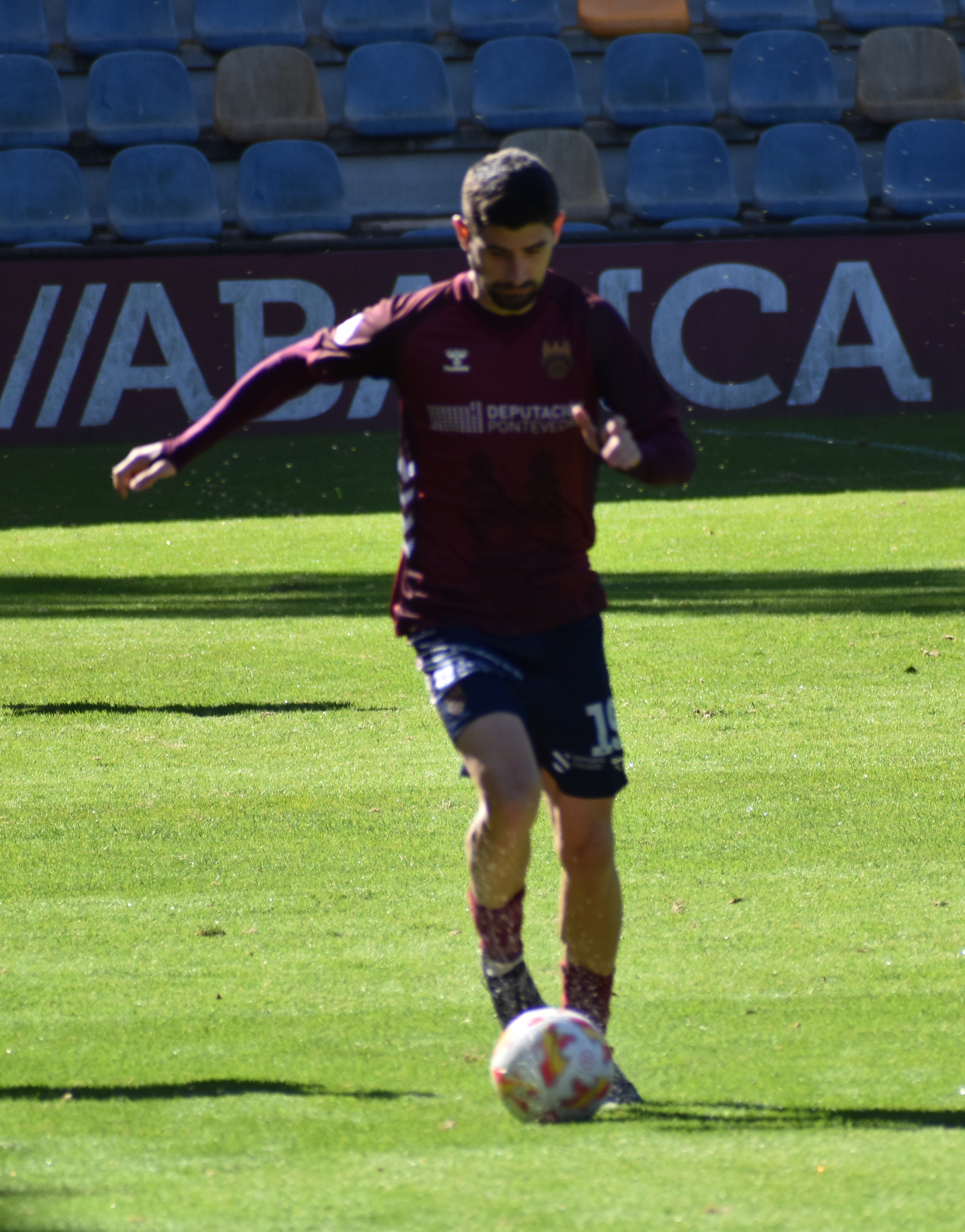
Jon Bakero won the award in 2017 along with the Hermann Trophy, while playing for Wake Forest University.

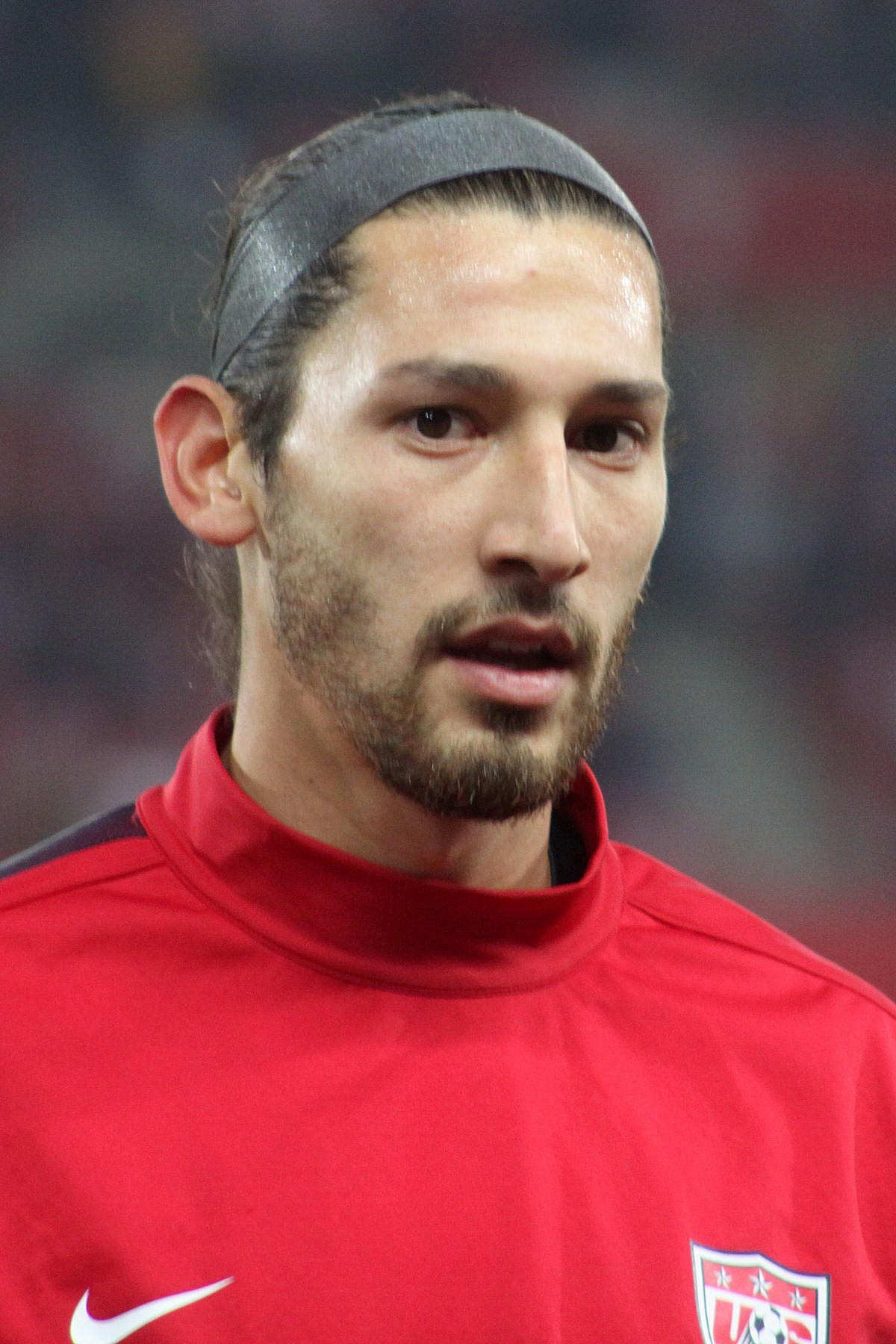
Omar Gonzalez won the defensive player award in 2007, while playing for the University of Maryland.

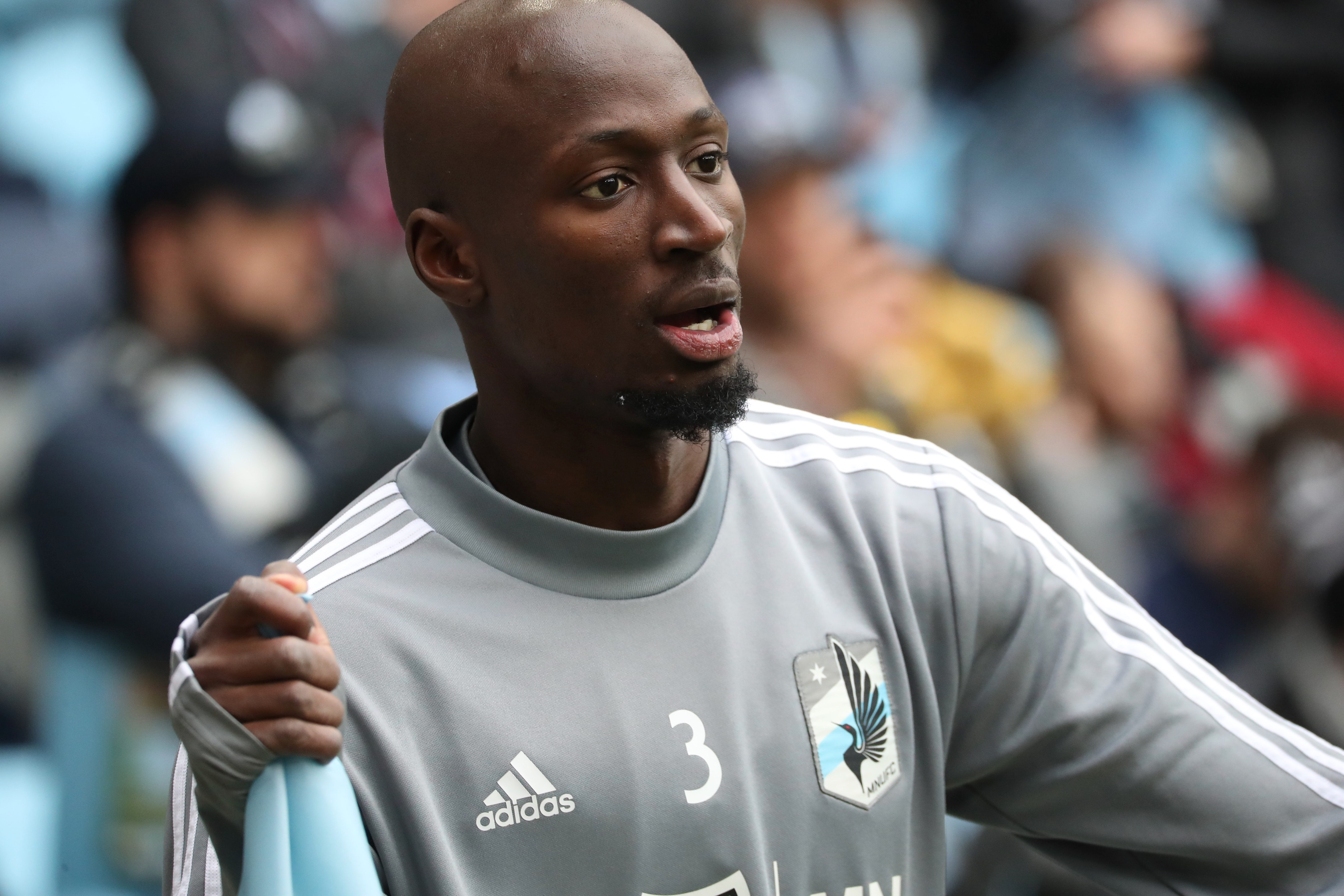
Ike Opara was the first player to win the ACC Defensive Player of the Year consecutively, in 2008 and 2009, while playing for Wake Forest University.

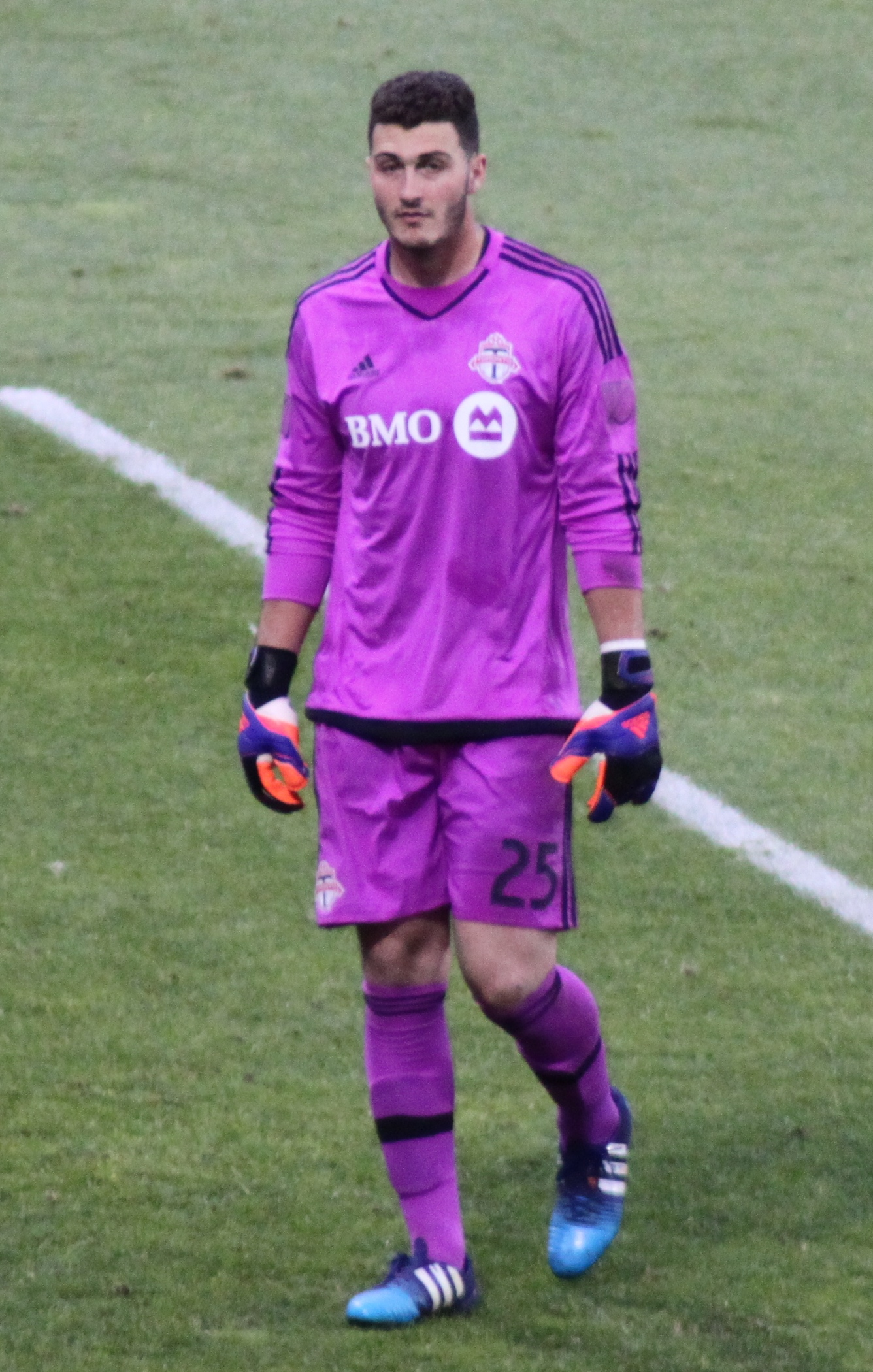
Alex Bono won the award in 2014, while playing for Syracuse University.

Season	Player	School	Position	Class	Reference
1970	Nick Skirka	Maryland	Midfielder	Freshman	
1971	Somnuk Vixaysouk	NC State	Forward	Senior	
1972	Clyde Browne	Clemson	Forward	Freshman	
1973	Clyde Browne (2)	Clemson	Forward	Sophomore	
1974	Clyde Browne (3)	Clemson	Forward	Junior	
1975	Clyde Browne (4)†	Clemson	Forward	Senior	
1975	Godwin Obueze†	Clemson	Midfielder	Junior	
1976	Godwin Obueze (2)	Clemson	Midfielder	Senior	
1977	Benedict Poppola	Clemson	Defender	Senior	
1978	Damian Ogunsuyi	Clemson	Forward	Junior	
1979	Nnamdi Nwokocha	Clemson	Forward	Senior	
1980	Prince Afejuku	NC State	Forward	Senior	
1981	Joe Ulrich	Duke	Defender	Junior	
1982	Sam Okpodu	NC State	Forward	Senior	
1983	Abubarie Otorubio	Clemson	Forward	Senior	
1984	Jeff Gaffney	Virginia	Forward	Sophomore	
1985	Gary Conner	Virginia	Forward	Junior	
1986	John Kerr	Duke	Midfielder	Senior	
1987	John Harkes	Virginia	Midfielder	Senior	
1988	Jeff Agoos	Virginia	Defender	Sophomore	
1989	Tony Meola	Virginia	Goalkeeper	Junior	
1990	Henry Gutierrez	NC State	Midfielder	Sophomore	
1991	Henry Gutierrez (2)	NC State	Midfielder	Junior	
1992	Scott Schweitzer	NC State	Defender	Senior	
1993	Jimmy Glenn	Clemson	Forward	Senior	
1994	Kyle Campbell	NC State	Goalkeeper	Sophomore	
1995	Mike Fisher	Virginia	Midfielder	Junior	
1996	Mike Fisher (2)	Virginia	Midfielder	Senior	
1997	Leo Cullen	Maryland	Defender	Senior	
1998	Wojtek Krakowiak	Clemson	Midfielder	Senior	
1999	Ali Curtis	Duke	Forward	Junior	
2000	Chris Carrieri	North Carolina	Midfielder	Senior	
2001	Kyle Martino	Virginia	Midfielder	Senior	
2002	Alecko Eskandarian	Virginia	Midfielder	Senior	
2003	Jeremiah White	Wake Forest	Midfielder	Senior	

=== Offensive Player of the Year ===
Season	Player	School	Position	Class	Reference
2004	Scott Sealy	Wake Forest	Forward	Senior	
2005	Jason Garey	Maryland	Forward	Sophomore	
2006	Charlie Davies	Boston College	Forward	Senior	
2007	Alejandro Bedoya	Boston College	Midfielder	Junior	
2008	Mike Grella	Duke	Forward	Senior	
2009	Corben Bone	Wake Forest	Midfielder	Junior	
2010	Ryan Finley	Duke	Forward	Senior	
2011	Andrew Wenger	Duke	Forward	Junior	
2012	Patrick Mullins	Maryland	Forward	Junior	
2013	Harrison Shipp	Notre Dame	Midfielder	Senior	
2014	Patrick Hodan	Notre Dame	Midfielder	Junior	
2015	Jack Harrison	Wake Forest	Midfielder	Freshman	
2016	Jon Gallagher	Notre Dame	Midfielder	Junior	
2017	Jon Bakero	Wake Forest	Forward	Senior	
2018	Omir Fernandez	Wake Forest	Forward	Sophomore	
2019	Robbie Robinson	Clemson	Forward	Junior	
2020	Valentin Noël	Pittsburgh	Midfielder	Sophomore	
2021	Thorleifur Ulfarsson	Pittsburgh	Forward	Sophomore	
2022	Shak Mohammed	Duke	Forward	Sophomore	
2023	Forster Ajago	Duke	Forward	Graduate Student	
2024	Matthew Roou	Notre Dame	Forward	Senior	
2025	Donavan Phillip	NC State	Forward	Junior	
2026	Joschi Schelb	North Carolina	Forward	Senior	

=== Defensive Player of the Year ===
Season	Player	School	Position	Class	Reference
2004	Michael Parkhurst	Wake Forest	Defender	Sophomore	
2005	Nathan Sturgis	Clemson	Defender	Senior	
2006	Chris Seitz	Maryland	Goalkeeper	Senior	
2007	Omar Gonzalez	Maryland	Defender	Sophomore	
2008	Ike Opara	Wake Forest	Defender	Sophomore	
2009	Ike Opara	Wake Forest	Defender	Junior	
2010	Andrew Wenger	Duke	Defender	Sophomore	
2011	Matt Hedges	North Carolina	Defender	Senior	
2012	Sebastien Ibeagha	Duke	Defender	Junior	
2013	Boyd Okwuonu	North Carolina	Defender	Junior	
2014	Alex Bono	Syracuse	Goalkeeper	Junior	
2015	Kyle Fisher	Clemson	Defender	Senior	
2016	Miles Robinson	Syracuse	Defender	Sophomore	
2017	Kevin Politz	Wake Forest	Defender	Senior	
2018	Alex Comsia	North Carolina	Defender	Senior	
2019	Malick Mbaye	Clemson	Defender	Senior	
2020	Jasper Löeffelsend	Pittsburgh	Defender	Graduate Student	
2021	Jasper Löeffelsend (2)	Pittsburgh	Defender	Graduate Student	
2022	Andreas Ueland	Pittsburgh	Defender	Senior	
2023	Garrison Tubbs	Wake Forest	Defender	Senior	
2024	Casper Svendby	Pittsburgh	Defender	Junior	
2025	Nikola Markovic	NC State	Defender	Sophomore	
2026	Enzo Panozzo	SMU	Defender	Fifth Year	

=== Midfielder of the Year ===
Season	Player	School	Position	Class	Reference
2016	Ian Harkes	Wake Forest	Midfielder	Senior	
2017	Cam Lindley	North Carolina	Midfielder	Sophomore	
2018	Bruno Lapa	Wake Forest	Midfielder	Junior	
2019	Joe Bell	Virginia	Midfielder	Junior	
2020	Daniel Pereira	Virginia Tech	Midfielder	Sophomore	
2021	Peter Stroud	Duke	Midfielder	Sophomore	
2022	Peter Stroud (2)	Duke	Midfielder	Junior	
2023	Jeorgio Kocevski	Syracuse	Midfielder	Senior	
2023	Mouhameth Thiam	Virginia	Midfielder	Senior	
2024	Joran Gerbet	Clemson	Midfielder	Senior	
2025	Ransford Gyan	Clemson	Midfielder	Sophomore	
2026	Jaylinn Mitchell	SMU	Midfielder	Senior	
2026	Jack Pymm	Stanford	Midfielder	Sophomore	
