= 2025 Clemson Tigers men's soccer team =

American college soccer season

2025 Clemson Tigers men's soccer

NCAA tournament, First Round
- Conference: Atlantic Coast Conference
- Record: 8–6–3 (4–2–2 ACC)
- Head coach: Mike Noonan (16th season)
- Assistant coaches: Philip Jones (13th season); Camilo Rodriguez (10th season); Gaye Diadie (1st season)
- Home stadium: Riggs Field

2025 ACC men's soccer standings
	Conf.					Overall
Team	W		L		T	W		L		T
No. 11 Virginia †+	5	–	0	–	3	12	–	2	–	5
No. 9 Stanford +	5	–	2	–	1	14	–	4	–	2
No. 2 NC State +	4	–	1	–	3	16	–	3	–	4
Clemson +	4	–	2	–	2	8	–	6	–	3
Duke +	4	–	2	–	2	10	–	4	–	6
Syracuse +	4	–	3	–	1	9	–	8	–	3
No. 15 SMU ‡	3	–	2	–	3	11	–	5	–	4
Notre Dame +	3	–	3	–	2	9	–	7	–	4
North Carolina +	2	–	2	–	4	9	–	5	–	6
Wake Forest	2	–	3	–	3	7	–	4	–	6
Virginia Tech	2	–	3	–	3	7	–	4	–	5
California	2	–	5	–	1	8	–	8	–	2
Pittsburgh	1	–	4	–	3	6	–	7	–	5
Louisville	1	–	5	–	2	5	–	7	–	5
Boston College	1	–	6	–	1	7	–	9	–	1
† – Conference champion ‡ – ACC tournament champion + – At-large invitation to the 2025 NCAA tournament; As of May 2, 2026; Rankings from United Soccer Coaches; Source:The ACC

The 2025 Clemson Tigers men's soccer team represented Clemson University during the 2025 NCAA Division I men's soccer season. The Tigers were led by head coach Mike Noonan, in his sixteenth season. They played their home games at Riggs Field in Clemson, South Carolina. This was the team's 65th season playing organized men's college soccer and their 38th playing in the Atlantic Coast Conference.

The Tigers started the season ranked ninth nationally and drew at eleventh ranked Indiana to begin their season. The team rose to sixth in the rankings before winning their Rivalry match against South Carolina 4–1. They rose to third in the rankings before their ACC season opener against tenth-ranked Pittsburgh. They won the match 3–2 and rose to second in the rankings. A loss against VCU and a draw at SMU saw them fall to fourteenth. The Tigers then lost to Queens and defeated ACC foe California to end a three-game winless streak. They fell out of the rankings and defeated thirteenth-ranked Wake Forest and Elon. Over their final five games the Tigers went 2–2–1 with defeats of tenth-ranked Duke and UNC Wilmington, losses to NC State and eleventh-ranked Virginia, and a draw on the final day of the regular season against Virginia Tech.

The Tigers finished the regular season 8–4–3 and 4–2–2 in ACC play. They finished in second place in the ACC. As the second seed in the ACC Tournament, they lost to Pittsburgh in a re-match of a September 5th regular season game. The Tigers received an at-large bid to the NCAA Tournament, and were an un-seeded team. They were defeated by Western Michigan 0–1 in the First Round to end their season with a 8–6–3 record. Their eight wins were their lowest win total since 2018.

== Previous season ==
The Tigers finished the regular season 11–2–3 and 5–2–1 in ACC play. They finished in a tie for fourth place in the ACC. As the fourth seed in the ACC Tournament, they defeated Louisville in the First Round, Stanford in the Quarterfinals, and California in the Semifinals to return to the Final for a third straight year. They faced Wake Forest, who defeated them in a penalty shoot-out. The Tigers received an at-large bid to the NCAA Tournament, and were the ninth overall seed. A defeat of Providence in the First Round, saw them match-up again with Wake Forest. Clemson lost this round 2–1 in overtime to end their title defense.

== Player movement ==
=== Players leaving ===
Players Leaving
Name	Number	Pos.	Height	Weight	Year	Hometown	Reason for departure
Patrick Donovan	0	GK	6'2"	190	Junior	Westport, Connecticut	Transferred to Boston College
Adam Lundegard	3	DF	6'2"	170	(redshirt) Junior	La Plata, Maryland	Graduated
Galen Flynn	4	DF	6'0"	165	(redshirt) Junior	West Hartford, Connecticut	Graduated
Terry Watson	5	DF	6'2"	170	Junior	Blythewood, South Carolina	Transferred to Gonzaga
Joran Gerbet	6	DF	5'11"	160	Senior	Saint-Laurent-du-Pape, France	Graduated, selected 27th overall in the 2025 MLS SuperDraft
Mason Lamb	8	DF	6'3"	190	Senior	Clermont, Florida	Graduated
Tyler Trimnal	9	FW	6'3"	175	Junior	Lancaster, South Carolina	Transferred to South Carolina
Jackson Wrobel	10	MF	5'9"	162	Senior	Madison, Alabama	Graduated
Charlie Reed	12	GK	6'3"	195	Freshman	Austin, Texas	Joined Clemson Tigers football
Mathieu Brick	13	DF	5'8"	158	Sophomore	Oviedo, Florida	Transferred to Duquesne
Titus Sandy Jr	14	DF	6'0"	165	Graduate Student	Charlotte, North Carolina	Graduated
Alex Meinhard	15	FW	6'0"	178	Graduate Student	Tartu, Estonia	Graduated
Antonio Illuminato	17	MF	5'10"	150	Graduate Student	Cardito, Italy	Graduated
Noah Behrmann	21	MF	5'10"	172	Junior	Charlotte, North Carolina	Transferred to High Point
Will Cain	28	MF	5'10"		Sophomore	Hartlepool, England	Transferred to Gardner–Webb
Rafael Borlido	29	DF	6'0"	153	Sophomore	Belo Horizonte, Brazil	Transferred to Queens
Logan Brown	31	GK	6'1"	178	Sophomore	Spartanburg, South Carolina	—
Samir Dishnica	34	MF	5'10"	151	Sophomore	Cheshire, Connecticut	Transferred to Lafayette
Paulino Paz	35	MF	6'0"	150	Freshman	La Paz, Bolivia	Transferred to American

=== Players arriving ===
==== Incoming transfers ====
Incoming transfers
Name	Number	Pos.	Height	Weight	Year	Hometown	Previous school
Olafur Floki Stephensen	4	DF	6'4"	172	Sophomore	Garðabær, Iceland	Virginia Tech

==== Recruiting class ====
Name	Nat.	Hometown	Club	TDS Rating
Kwaku Agyabeng; MF	GHA	Kumasi, Ghana	Cedar Stars Rush	3/5 stars
Augustine Asante; DF	GHA	Kumasi, Ghana	Montverde Academy	3/5 stars
Andres Beirute; FW	CRC	San José, Costa Rica	LD Alajuelense II	N/A
Caleb George; MF	RSA	Cape Town, South Africa	SIMA	3/5 stars
Cooper Hineline; FW	USA	Denver, Colorado	Real Colorado	3/5 stars
Abdou Mane; MF	SEN	Dakar, Senegal	Montverde Academy	3/5 stars
Kyle Mattis; FW	CRC	San José, Costa Rica	LD Alajuelense II	N/A
Reid Raintree; MF	USA	Aiken, South Carolina	South Carolina United FC	3/5 stars
Justin Ross; GK	USA	West Chester, Pennsylvania	Philadelphia Union	3/5 stars
Ivan Schmid; GK	USA	Weston, Florida	Inter Miami CF II	3/5 stars
Xander Sevian; FW	USA	Boulder, Colorado	Real Colorado	3/5 stars
Seamus Streelman; DF	USA	Atlanta, Georgia	Atlanta United FC	3/5 stars

== Squad ==
=== Roster ===
As of December 19, 2025

Note: Flags indicate national team as defined under FIFA eligibility rules; some limited exceptions apply. Players may hold more than one non-FIFA nationality.

No.	Pos.	Nation	Player
0	GK	USA	Aiden Hampton
1	GK	GHA	Joseph Andema
2	DF	ISL	Lukas Magnason
3	DF	FRA	Arthur Duquenne
4	DF	ISL	Olafur Floki Stephensen
5	DF	GHA	Augustine Asante
6	MF	GER	Daniel Bunk
7	FW	GHA	Wahabu Musah
8	MF	GHA	Kwaku Agyabeng
10	MF	GHA	Ransford Gyan
11	MF	JPN	Misei Yoshizawa
12	GK	USA	Justin Ross
14	FW	USA	Cooper Hineline
15	MF	GHA	Abdou Mane
16	MF	USA	Mason Jimenez

No.	Pos.	Nation	Player
17	MF	RSA	Caleb George
18	DF	USA	Matthias Leib
19	FW	USA	James Kelly
20	FW	CRC	Andres Beirute
21	MF	ITA	Gabriel Santuari
22	MF	CRC	Kyle Mattis
23	FW	USA	Duncan Wilson
24	FW	USA	Vitor Geromel
25	MF	USA	Nathan Richmond
26	FW	ITA	Marco Garcia
27	DF	USA	Seamus Streelman
28	FW	USA	Xander Sevian
30	FW	USA	Remi Okunlola
31	GK	USA	Ivan Schmid

=== Team management ===
Position	Staff
Athletic Director	(United States) Graham Neff
Head coach	(United States) Mike Noonan
Associate head coach	(England) Philip Jones
Assistant Coach	(Colombia) Camilo Rodriguez
Assistant Coach	(France) Gaye Diadie
Director of Operations	(United States) Rob Thompson

== Schedule ==
Date Time, TV	Rank^{#}	Opponent^{#}	Result	Record	Site (Attendance) City, State
Exhibition
August 9*; 6:00 p.m.	No. 9	Charlotte	None Reported	–	Riggs Field; Clemson, SC
August 12*; 6:00 p.m.	No. 9	USC Upstate	None Reported	–	Riggs Field; Clemson, SC
August 16*; 7:00 p.m.	No. 9	at Georgia State	W 3–1	–	GSU Soccer Field; Atlanta, GA
Regular season
August 21*; 6:00 p.m., BTN+	No. 9	at No. 11 Indiana	T 2–2	0–0–1	Bill Armstrong Stadium (6,395); Bloomington, IN
August 26*; 7:00 p.m., ACCN	No. 6	South Carolina; Rivalry	W 4–1	1–0–1	Riggs Field (6,536); Clemson, SC
August 29*; 6:00 p.m., ACCNX	No. 6	UAB	W 6–0	2–0–1	Riggs Field (3,422); Clemson, SC
September 5; 6:00 p.m., ACCNX	No. 3	No. 10 Pittsburgh	W 3–2	3–0–1 (1–0–0)	Riggs Field (2,184); Clemson, SC
September 9*; 6:00 p.m., ACCNX	No. 2	VCU	L 1–2	3–1–1	Riggs Field (1); Clemson, SC
September 13; 7:00 p.m., ACCNX	No. 2	at SMU	T 1–1	3–1–2 (1–0–1)	Washburne Stadium (2,093); University Park, TX
September 16*; 6:00 p.m., ACCNX	No. 14	Queens	L 0–1	3–2–2	Riggs Field (877); Clemson, SC
September 19; 6:00 p.m., ACCNX	No. 14	California	W 3–1	4–2–2 (2–0–1)	Riggs Field (3,110); Clemson, SC
September 26; 6:00 p.m., ACCN		at No. 13 Wake Forest	W 4–3	5–2–2 (3–0–1)	Spry Stadium (2,186); Winston-Salem, NC
October 4*; 7:00 p.m., ACCNX		Elon	W 1–0	6–2–2	Riggs Field (877); Clemson, SC
October 10; 7:00 p.m., ACCN		at NC State	L 0–1	6–3–2 (3–1–1)	Dail Soccer Field (2,098); Raleigh, NC
October 17; 8:00 p.m., ACCN		No. 10 Duke	W 3–0	7–3–2 (4–1–1)	Riggs Field (3,629); Clemson, SC
October 21*; 6:00 p.m., ACCNX		UNC Wilmington	W 6–0	8–3–2	Riggs Field (1,531); Clemson, SC
October 25; 6:00 p.m., ACCNX		at No. 11 Virginia	L 0–4	8–4–2 (4–2–1)	Klöckner Stadium (1,267); Charlottesville, VA
October 31; 7:00 p.m., ACCNX		Virginia Tech	T 3–3	8–4–3 (4–2–2)	Riggs Field (1,721); Clemson, SC
ACC Tournament
November 5*; 7:00 p.m., ACCNX	(4)	(13) Pittsburgh; First Round	L 0–1	8–5–3	Riggs Field (1,720); Clemson, SC
NCAA Tournament
November 20*; 6:00 p.m., ESPN+		Western Michigan; First Round	L 0–1	8–6–3	Riggs Field (861); Clemson, SC
*Non-conference game. ^{#}Rankings from United Soccer Coaches. (#) Tournament seedings in parentheses. All times are in Eastern.

== Goals record ==
Rank	No.	Nat.	Po.	Name	Regular season	ACC Tournament	NCAA Tournament	Total
1	10	(Ghana)	MF	Ransford Gyan	8	0	0	8
2	25	(United States)	MF	Nathan Richmond	7	0	0	7
3	7	(Ghana)	FW	Wahabu Musah	6	0	0	6
3	11	(Japan)	MF	Misei Yoshizawa	6	0	0	6
5	2	(Iceland)	DF	Lukas Magnason	2	0	0	2
6	4	(Iceland)	DF	Olafur Floki Stephensen	1	0	0	1
6	8	(Ghana)	MF	Kwaku Agyabeng	1	0	0	1
6	15	(Ghana)	MF	Abdou Mane	1	0	0	1
6	16	(United States)	MF	Mason Jimenez	1	0	0	1
6	18	(United States)	DF	Matthias Leib	1	0	0	1
6	19	(United States)	FW	James Kelly	1	0	0	1
6	20	(Costa Rica)	FW	Andres Beirute	1	0	0	1
6	23	(United States)	FW	Duncan Wilson	1	0	0	1
Total					37	0	0	37

== Disciplinary record ==
Rank	No.	Nat.	Po.	Name	Regular Season			ACC Tournament			NCAA Tournament			Total		
Rank	No.	Nat.	Po.	Name	Yellow card	(yellow card) (yellow-red card)	Red card	Yellow card	(yellow card) (yellow-red card)	Red card	Yellow card	(yellow card) (yellow-red card)	Red card	Yellow card	(yellow card) (yellow-red card)	Red card
1	4	(Iceland)	DF	Olafur Floki Stephensen	5	0	0	0	0	0	0	0	0	5	0	0
2	3	(France)	DF	Arthur Duquenne	3	0	0	0	0	0	1	0	0	4	0	0
2	8	(Ghana)	MF	Kwaku Agyabeng	2	1	0	0	0	0	0	0	0	2	1	0
4	2	(Iceland)	DF	Lukas Magnason	2	0	0	1	0	0	0	0	0	3	0	0
4	10	(Ghana)	MF	Ransford Gyan	3	0	0	0	0	0	0	0	0	3	0	0
5	7	(Ghana)	FW	Wahabu Musah	0	1	0	0	0	0	0	0	0	0	1	0
5	15	(Ghana)	MF	Abdou Mane	2	0	0	0	0	0	0	0	0	2	0	0
5	16	(United States)	MF	Mason Jimenez	2	0	0	0	0	0	0	0	0	2	0	0
5	28	(United States)	DF	Xander Sevian	2	0	0	0	0	0	0	0	0	2	0	0
11	6	(Germany)	MF	Daniel Bunk	1	0	0	0	0	0	0	0	0	1	0	0
11	14	(United States)	FW	Cooper Hineline	1	0	0	0	0	0	0	0	0	1	0	0
11	18	(United States)	DF	Matthias Leib	0	0	0	1	0	0	0	0	0	1	0	0
11	20	(Costa Rica)	FW	Andres Beirute	1	0	0	0	0	0	0	0	0	1	0	0
11	22	(Costa Rica)	MF	Kyle Pennant	1	0	0	0	0	0	0	0	0	1	0	0
11	23	(United States)	FW	Duncan Wilson	1	0	0	0	0	0	0	0	0	1	0	0
11	30	(United States)	FW	Remi Okunlola	1	0	0	0	0	0	0	0	0	1	0	0
Total					27	2	0	2	0	0	1	0	0	30	2	0

== Awards and honors ==
Recipient	Award	Date	Ref.
Ransford Gyan	Preseason ACC Watchlist	August 13	
Ransford Gyan	Hermann Trophy Preseason Watchlist	August 21	
Ransford Gyan	ACC Offensive Player of the Week – Week 2	September 2	
Ransford Gyan	ACC Offensive Player of the Week – Week 3	September 9	
Nathan Richmond	ACC Offensive Player of the Week – Week 6	September 30	
Kwaku Agyabeng	ACC Offensive Player of the Week – Week 9	October 21	
Ransford Gyan	ACC Midfielder of the Year	November 12	
Ransford Gyan	All-ACC First Team	November 12	
Wahabu Musah	All-ACC Second Team	November 12	
Nathan Richmond	All-ACC Second Team	November 12	
Kwaku Agyabeng	All-ACC Third Team	November 12	
Misei Yoshizawa	All-ACC Third Team	November 12	
Kwaku Agyabeng	ACC All-Freshman Team	November 12	

== 2026 MLS Super Draft ==
Player	Team	Round	Pick #	Position
(Ghana) Kwaku Agyabeng	Sporting Kansas City	1	4	MF
(Iceland) Lukas Magnason	Real Salt Lake	1	13	DF
(Ghana) Wahabu Musah	Colorado Rapids	1	26	FW
(Ghana) Ransford Gyan	New York City FC	1	27	FW

== Rankings ==
Ranking movements Legend: ██ Increase in ranking ██ Decrease in ranking — = Not ranked RV = Received votes
	Week																
Poll	Pre	1	2	3	4	5	6	7	8	9	10	11	12	13	14	15	Final
United Soccer	9	6	3	2	14	—	RV	—	—	RV	—	RV	—	Not released			—
TopDrawer Soccer	11	7	2	1	6	17	10	9	13	10	18	—	—	—	—	—	—
College Soccer News	7	7	4	1	6	8	14	15	16	15	20	24	RV	RV	Not released		
