= 2025 ACC men's soccer tournament =

Soccer tournament

- Classification: Division I
- Teams: 15
- Matches: 14
- Attendance: 15,075
- First round site: Campus Sites
- Quarterfinals site: Campus Sites
- Semifinals site: First Horizon Stadium; Cary, North Carolina
- Finals site: First Horizon Stadium; Cary, North Carolina
- Champions: SMU (1st title)
- Winning coach: Kevin Hudson (1st title)
- MVP: Slade Starnes (SMU)
- Broadcast: ESPNU (Final), ACC Network

2025 ACC men's soccer standings
	Conf.					Overall
Team	W		L		T	W		L		T
No. 11 Virginia †+	5	–	0	–	3	12	–	2	–	5
No. 9 Stanford +	5	–	2	–	1	14	–	4	–	2
No. 2 NC State +	4	–	1	–	3	16	–	3	–	4
Clemson +	4	–	2	–	2	8	–	6	–	3
Duke +	4	–	2	–	2	10	–	4	–	6
Syracuse +	4	–	3	–	1	9	–	8	–	3
No. 15 SMU ‡	3	–	2	–	3	11	–	5	–	4
Notre Dame +	3	–	3	–	2	9	–	7	–	4
North Carolina +	2	–	2	–	4	9	–	5	–	6
Wake Forest	2	–	3	–	3	7	–	4	–	6
Virginia Tech	2	–	3	–	3	7	–	4	–	5
California	2	–	5	–	1	8	–	8	–	2
Pittsburgh	1	–	4	–	3	6	–	7	–	5
Louisville	1	–	5	–	2	5	–	7	–	5
Boston College	1	–	6	–	1	7	–	9	–	1
† – Conference champion ‡ – ACC tournament champion + – At-large invitation to the 2025 NCAA tournament; As of May 2, 2026; Rankings from United Soccer Coaches; Source:The ACC

The 2025 ACC men's soccer tournament was the 39th edition of the ACC men's soccer tournament. The tournament decided the Atlantic Coast Conference champion and guaranteed representative into the 2025 NCAA Division I men's soccer tournament. The tournament was held from November 5 to November 16, 2025. The Semifinal and Final were played at First Horizon Stadium in Cary, North Carolina and earlier rounds were played on campus sites.

Wake Forest were the defending tournament champions. Wake was unable to defend its title as they were eliminated by seventh-seed Southern Methodist University in the first round. SMU went on to win the tournament over first seed Virginia, 1–0 in the Final. This was the first ACC tournament title for SMU, after joining the conference last year. They had previously won ten conference titles in the WAC and American Conference. It was also the first ACC tournament title for head coach Kevin Hudson, and it is his third conference tournament title.

== Qualification ==
All fifteen teams in the Atlantic Coast Conference earned a berth into the ACC Tournament. The First Round and Quarterfinals are hosted by the higher seeds. Seeding was determined by regular season conference record. The seeding for the tournament was determined on the final day of conference play, October 31. A tiebreaker was required to determine the fourth and fifth seed as Clemson and Duke finished tied with fourteen conference points and identical 4–2–2 records. Clemson earned the fourth seed by virtue of their 3–0 victory over Duke during the regular season on October 17. A tiebreaker was required to determine the tenth and eleventh seeds as Virginia Tech and Wake Forest both finished with nine points and 2–3–3 records. The two teams did not play during conference play, so the second tiebreaker of goal difference in conference play was used. Wake Forest finished with a -2 goal difference and Virginia Tech finished with a -3 goal difference. Therefore, Wake Forest was the tenth seed and Virginia Tech was the eleventh seed.

Seed	School	Conference Record	Points
1	Virginia	5–0–3	18
2	Stanford	5–2–1	16
3	NC State	4–1–3	15
4	Clemson	4–2–2	14
5	Duke	4–2–2	14
6	Syracuse	4–3–1	13
7	SMU	3–2–3	12
8	Notre Dame	3–3–2	11
9	North Carolina	2–2–4	10
10	Wake Forest	2–3–3	9
11	Virginia Tech	2–3–3	9
12	California	2–5–1	7
13	Pittsburgh	1–4–3	6
14	Louisville	1–5–2	5
15	Boston College	1–6–1	4

== Bracket ==
*Note: Home team listed first. Rankings shown are ACC Tournament Seeds.

First Round; November 5 ACCN & ACCNX
8	Notre Dame	1
9	North Carolina	3
4	Clemson	0
13	Pittsburgh	1
5	Duke	0
12	California	2
3	NC State	3
14	Louisville	0
6	Syracuse	2
11	Virginia Tech	1
7	SMU	5
10	Wake Forest	4
2	Stanford	4
15	Boston College	2

Quarterfinals; November 9 ACCN
1	Virginia	2
9	North Carolina	1
13	Pittsburgh	0
12	California	1
3	NC State	0
6	Syracuse	3
7	SMU	1
2	Stanford	0

Semifinals; November 13; ACCN
1	Virginia	2
12	California	1
6	Syracuse	1
7	SMU	5

Final; November 16; ESPNU
1	Virginia	0
7	SMU	1

== Matches ==
=== First round ===
November 5, 2025	(3) NC State	3–0	(14) Louisville	Raleigh, North Carolina
6:00 p.m. EST	Drew Lovelace 22', (yellow card) 79'; Carlos Santamaria 40'; Justin Mclean (yellow card) 82'; Thomas Lamaille 86'; Riley Moloney (yellow card) 89'	Report	(yellow card) 79' Jack Lewis; (yellow card) 82' Noah De Blasis; (yellow card) 90' Elijah Brijbasi	Stadium: Dail Soccer Field; Attendance: 1,798

November 5, 2025	(6) Syracuse	2–1	(11) Virginia Tech	Syracuse, New York
6:00 p.m. EST	Tim Brdaric 23', 63'	Report	41' Declan Quill; (yellow card) 57' Amir Ariely	Stadium: SU Soccer Stadium; Attendance: 341; Referee: Amin Hadzic; Assistant referees: Ankur Singh; TJ Jiries; Fourth official: Sergio Gonzalez

November 5, 2025	(4) Clemson	0–1	(13) Pittsburgh	Clemson, South Carolina
7:00 p.m. EST	Matthias Leib (yellow card) 75'; Lukas Magnason (yellow card) 79'	Report	8' Lasse Dahl; (yellow card) 58' Logan Oliver; (yellow card) 68' Casper Svendby	Stadium: Riggs Field; Attendance: 1,720; Referee: Stephen Foster; Assistant referees: Benjamin Wooten; Gabriel Rivera; Fourth official: David Erbacher

November 5, 2025	(5) Duke	0–2	(12) California	Durham, North Carolina
7:00 p.m. EST	Jose Ortega (red card) 83'; Team (yellow card) 83'	Report	(yellow card) 20' Junhwan Park; 37' Alfredo Ortiz; (yellow card) 47' Gaku Nishimura; 81' (pen.), (yellow card) 83' Luka Lukic	Stadium: Koskinen Stadium; Attendance: 738; Referee: Kevin Maurer; Assistant referees: Raymond Thomas; Chris Zuerner; Fourth official: Dustin Thorne

November 5, 2025	(7) SMU	5–4	(10) Wake Forest	University Park, Texas
7:00 p.m. EST	Stephen Soghomonian 5', (yellow card) 45'; Enzo Panozzo 63', (yellow card) 86'; Slade Starnes 69'; Milton Lopez 72'; Landon Hickam 90'; Team (yellow card) 90'	Report	4', 15', (red card) 76' Cooper Flax; (yellow card) 33' Basit Umar; (yellow card) 63' David Ndong Nguema; 86' Nico Rabiu; 88' Ryan Belal	Stadium: Washburne Stadium; Attendance: 1,016; Referee: Kyle Johnston; Assistant referees: John Villalobos; Jarrod Tackel; Fourth official: Troy Dodge

November 5, 2025	(8) Notre Dame	1–3	(9) North Carolina	Notre Dame, Indiana
7:00 p.m. EST	Will Schroeder (yellow card) 13'; Mitch Ferguson 84'	Report	21' Nacho Abeal; 36' Charlie Antonelius; (yellow card) 45' Riley Berge; (yellow card) 69' Dylan Kropp; 70' Dan Klink	Stadium: Alumni Stadium; Attendance: 479; Referee: John Matto; Assistant referees: Brian Alvarez; Eric Burton; Fourth official: Saleem Abufares

November 5, 2025	(2) Stanford	4–2	(15) Boston College	Stanford, California
9:00 p.m. EST	Will Cleary 38', 54'; Jack Pymm (yellow card) 33', (goal) 46'; Alex Chow (yellow card) 84'; Tomo Allen 89'	Report	13', 24', (yellow card) 86' Michael Asare; (yellow card) 30' Aidan Farwell; (yellow card) 55' Jack Burkhardt	Stadium: Cagan Stadium; Attendance: 639; Referee: Nicole Green; Assistant referees: Devlin Creighton; Brandon Chapman; Fourth official: Francisco Franco

=== Quarterfinals ===
November 9, 2025	(12) California	1–0	(13) Pittsburgh	Berkeley, California
2:00 p.m. EST	Beau Morrison 35'; Cesar Cordova (yellow card) 71'	Report	(yellow card) 90' Niklas Sørensen; (yellow card) 90' Jack Moxom; (yellow card) 90' Casper Svendby	Stadium: Edwards Stadium; Attendance: 627; Referee: Richonne Clark; Assistant referees: Levi Rippey; Justin Yarkin; Fourth official: Peter Hanson

November 9, 2025	(1) Virginia	2–1	(9) North Carolina	Charlottesville, Virginia
4:00 p.m. EST	Triton Beauvois 36'; Nicholas Simmonds 78'; Bacary Tandjigora (yellow card) 90'	Report	27' Gabriel Bracken Serra	Stadium: Klöckner Stadium; Attendance: 2,769; Referee: Dimitar Chavdarov; Assistant referees: Justin Howard; Anthony Wolford; Fourth official: Mike Stutt

November 9, 2025	(3) NC State	0–3	(6) Syracuse	Raleigh, North Carolina
6:00 p.m. EST	Taig Healy (yellow card) 88'	Report	(yellow card) 41' Kelvin Da Costa; 52' Sachiel Ming; (yellow card) 65' Garrett Holman; 69' Carlos Zambrano; 86' Chimere Omeze	Stadium: Dail Soccer Field; Attendance: 1,726; Referee: David Erbacher; Assistant referees: Rick Rogers; Raymond Thomas; Fourth official: Izlen Peksenar

November 9, 2025	(2) Stanford	0–1	(7) SMU	Stanford, California
8:00 p.m. EST	Fletcher Bank (yellow card) 62'; Dylan Groeneveld (yellow card) 86'	Report	60' (pen.) Stephan Soghomonian; (yellow card) 65' Alex Salvo	Stadium: Cagan Stadium; Attendance: 1,388; Referee: Daniel Radford; Assistant referees: Alan Martinez-Loyola; Oscar Guillen; Fourth official: Devlin Creighton

=== Semifinals ===
November 13, 2025	(1) Virginia	2–1	(12) California	Cary, North Carolina
5:30 p.m. EST	Bacary Tandjigora (yellow card) 24'; Triton Beauvois (yellow card) 40'; Reese Miller (yellow card) 61'; Cal Own Goal 74'; Albin Gashi (yellow card) 78'; AJ Smith 82'	Report	(yellow card) 75' Noe Morales; 87' Beau Morrison	Stadium: WakeMed Soccer Park; Attendance: 579; Referee: Nikola Aleksic; Assistant referees: Brian Alvarez; Chris Zuerner; Fourth official: Nicole Green

November 13, 2025	(6) Syracuse	1–5	(7) SMU	Cary, North Carolina
8:00 p.m. EST	Nathan Scott 85' (pen.); Garrett Holman (yellow card) 79'	Report	38' Mukisa Emmanuel; 45' Ryan Clanton-Pimentel; 50' Charles-Emile Brunet; 60' Stephan Soghomonian; (red card) 79' Team; 83' Landon Hickam	Stadium: WakeMed Soccer Park; Referee: Nick Balcer; Assistant referees: Jake Brochu; Hillis Waddell; Fourth official: Nicole Green

=== Final ===
November 16, 2025	(1) Virginia	0–1	(7) SMU	Cary, NC
1:00 p.m. EST	Albin Gashi (yellow card) 69'; Luke Burns (yellow card) 79'	Report	(yellow card) 41' Milton Lopez; 57' (pen.), (yellow card) 60' Stephan Soghomonian	Stadium: WakeMed Soccer Park; Attendance: 1,255; Referee: Lucas Feathers; Assistant referees: Rick Rogers; Kevin Uitto; Fourth official: Stephen Foster

== Statistics ==
=== Goalscorers ===
There were 46 goals scored in 14 matches, for an average of 3.29 goals per match (as of November 16, 2025).

4 goals

- (United States) Stephen Soghomonian – SMU

2 goals

- (Ghana) Michael Asare – Boston College
- (United States) Beau Morrison – California
- (United States) Landon Hickam – SMU
- (United States) Will Cleary – Stanford
- (Germany) Tim Brdaric – Syracuse
- (United States) Cooper Flax – Wake Forest

1 goal

- (Serbia) Luka Lukic – California
- (United States) Alfredo Ortiz – California
- (France) Thomas Lamaille – NC State
- (United States) Drew Lovelace – NC State
- (United States) Carlos Santamaria – NC State
- (Spain) Nacho Abeal – North Carolina
- (Sweden) Charlie Antonelius – North Carolina
- (United States) Gabriel Bracken Serra – North Carolina
- (United States) Dan Klink – North Carolina
- (United States) Mitch Ferguson – Notre Dame
- (Denmark) Lasse Dahl – Pittsburgh
- (United States) Ryan Clanton-Pimentel – SMU
- (Canada) Mukisa Emmanuel – SMU
- (Uganda) Charles-Emile Brunet – SMU
- (United States) Milton Lopez – SMU
- (United States) Enzo Panozzo – SMU
- (United States) Slade Starnes – SMU
- (United States) Tomo Allen – Stanford
- (United States) Jack Pymm – Stanford
- (Bermuda) Sachiel Ming – Syracuse
- (Canada) Chimere Omeze – Syracuse
- (United States) Nathan Scott – Syracuse
- (United States) Carlos Zambrano – Syracuse
- (United States) Triton Beauvois – Virginia
- (Jamaica) Nicholas Simmonds – Virginia
- (Denmark) AJ Smith – Virginia
- (United States) Declan Quill – Virginia Tech
- (United States) Ryan Belal – Wake Forest
- (United States) Nico Rabiu – Wake Forest

1 own goal

- California (against Virginia)

== All-Tournament team ==
Player	Team
**2025 ACC Men's Soccer All-Tournament team**
Beau Morrison	California
Gaku Nishimura	California
Ryan Clanton-Pimentel	SMU
Martin Dominguez	SMU
Stephan Soghomonian	SMU
**Slade Starnes**	SMU
Tim Brdaric	Syracuse
Tomas Hut	Syracuse
Jesus De Vicente	Virginia
Sebastian Pop	Virginia
Nicholas Simmonds	Virginia

MVP in Bold
