= ACC Rookie of the Year =

ACC Rookie of the Year may refer to:

- Atlantic Coast Conference Men's Basketball Rookie of the Year
- Atlantic Coast Conference Football Rookie of the Year
- Atlantic Coast Conference Men's Soccer Freshman of the Year
