= 2025 Virginia Cavaliers men's soccer team =

American college soccer season

2025 Virginia Cavaliers men's soccer

ACC regular season champions

NCAA tournament
- Conference: Atlantic Coast Conference
- U. Soc. Coaches poll: No. 11
- TopDrawerSoccer.com: No. 21
- Record: 12–2–5 (5–0–3 ACC)
- Head coach: George Gelnovatch (30th season)
- Assistant coaches: Matt Chulis (19th season); Adam Perron (6th season); Jermaine Birriel (3rd season)
- Home stadium: Klöckner Stadium

2025 ACC men's soccer standings
	Conf.					Overall
Team	W		L		T	W		L		T
No. 11 Virginia †+	5	–	0	–	3	12	–	2	–	5
No. 9 Stanford +	5	–	2	–	1	14	–	4	–	2
No. 2 NC State +	4	–	1	–	3	16	–	3	–	4
Clemson +	4	–	2	–	2	8	–	6	–	3
Duke +	4	–	2	–	2	10	–	4	–	6
Syracuse +	4	–	3	–	1	9	–	8	–	3
No. 15 SMU ‡	3	–	2	–	3	11	–	5	–	4
Notre Dame +	3	–	3	–	2	9	–	7	–	4
North Carolina +	2	–	2	–	4	9	–	5	–	6
Wake Forest	2	–	3	–	3	7	–	4	–	6
Virginia Tech	2	–	3	–	3	7	–	4	–	5
California	2	–	5	–	1	8	–	8	–	2
Pittsburgh	1	–	4	–	3	6	–	7	–	5
Louisville	1	–	5	–	2	5	–	7	–	5
Boston College	1	–	6	–	1	7	–	9	–	1
† – Conference champion ‡ – ACC tournament champion + – At-large invitation to the 2025 NCAA tournament; As of May 2, 2026; Rankings from United Soccer Coaches; Source:The ACC

The 2025 Virginia Cavaliers men's soccer team represented the University of Virginia during the 2025 NCAA Division I men's soccer season. The Cavaliers were led by head coach George Gelnovatch, in his 30th season. They played their home games at Klöckner Stadium in Charlottesville, Virginia. This was the team's 85th season playing organized men's college soccer and their 74th playing in the Atlantic Coast Conference (ACC).

== Player movement ==
=== Player leaving ===
Departures
Name	Number	Pos.	Height	Weight	Year	Hometown	Reason for departure

=== Player arriving ===
==== Incoming transfers ====
Incoming transfers
Name	Number	Pos.	Height	Weight	Year	Hometown	Previous school

==== Recruiting class ====
Recruiting Class
Name	Nat.	Hometown	Club	TDS Raiting

== Squad ==
=== Roster ===
As of September 1, 2025

=== Team management ===
Position	Staff
Head coach	George Gelnovatch
Associate Head Coach	Matt Chulis
Associate Head Coach	Adam Perron
Assistant coach	Jermaine Birriel

== Schedule ==
Date Time, TV	Rank^{#}	Opponent^{#}	Result	Record	Site (Attendance) City, State
Regular Season
August 21*; 8:00 p.m., ACCNX	No. 17	San Diego State	W 2–0	1–0–0	Klöckner Stadium (1,438); Charlottesville, VA
August 24*; 7:00 p.m., ACCNX	No. 17	Stetson	W 1–0	2–0–0	Klöckner Stadium (534); Charlottesville, VA
August 28*; 7:00 p.m., ESPN+	No. 11	at George Mason	L 1–4	2–1–0	George Mason Stadium (3,077); Fairfax, VA
September 1*; 7:00 p.m.	No. 11	American	W 1–0	3–1–0	Klöckner Stadium (845); Charlottesville, VA
September 5; 7:00 p.m., ACCNX		at No. 8 Virginia Tech; Rivalry	T 2–2	3–1–1 (0–0–1)	Thompson Field (2,438); Blacksburg, VA
September 13; 6:00 p.m., ACCNX		at No. 6 Louisville	W 1–0	4–1–1 (1–0–1)	Lynn Stadium (917); Louisville, KY
September 19; 7:00 p.m., ACCN		No. 1 Wake Forest	W 6–3	5–1–1 (2–0–1)	Klöckner Stadium (2,161); Charlottesville, VA
September 23		Dayton	Canceled		Klöckner Stadium; Charlottesville, VA
September 27; 7:00 p.m., ACCNX	No. 12	North Carolina	T 0–0	5–1–2 (2–0–2)	Klöckner Stadium (902); Charlottesville, VA
October 1*; 7:00 p.m.	No. 16	Milwaukee	W 3–2	6–1–2	Klöckner Stadium (780); Charlottesville, VA
October 5; 6:00 p.m., ACCN	No. 16	at No. 2 NC State	W 1–0	7–1–2 (3–0–2)	Dail Soccer Field (2,989); Raleigh, NC
October 10; 7:00 p.m., ACCNX	No. 8	Notre Dame	T 1–1	7–1–3 (3–0–3)	Klöckner Stadium (1,756); Charlottesville, VA
October 14*; 7:00 p.m., ACCNX	No. 9	No. 19 UNC Greensboro	T 1–1	7–1–4	Klöckner Stadium (604); Charlottesville, VA
October 19*; 1:00 p.m.	No. 9	Denver	W 2–1	8–1–4	Klöckner Stadium (706); Charlottesville, VA
October 25; 6:00 p.m.	No. 11	Clemson	W 4–0	9–1–4 (4–0–3)	Klöckner Stadium (1,267); Charlottesville, VA
October 31; 6:00 p.m., ACCNX	No. 6	at SMU	W 1–0	10–1–4 (5–0–3)	Washburne Stadium (803); Dallas, TX
ACC Tournament
November 9; 4:00 p.m., ACCN	(1) No. 4	(9) North Carolina; Quarterfinals	W 2–1	11–1–4	Klöckner Stadium (2,769); Charlottesville, VA
November 13; 5:30 p.m., ACCN	(1) No. 4	vs. (12) California; Semifinals	W 2–1	12–1–4	WakeMed Soccer Park (579); Cary, NC
November 16; 1:00 p.m., ESPNU	(1) No. 4	vs. (7) No. 25 SMU; Finals	L 0–1	12–2–4	WakeMed Soccer Park (1,255); Cary, NC
NCAA Tournament
November 23; 5:00 p.m., ESPN+	(2) No. 4	No. 18 UNC Greensboro; Second Round	T 2–2 (3–4 PKs) ^{2OT}	12–2–5	Klöckner Stadium (1,255); Charlottesville, VA
*Non-conference game. ^{#}Rankings from United Soccer Coaches. (#) Tournament seedings in parentheses. All times are in Eastern.

== Awards and honors ==
Recipient	Award	Date	Ref.
Umberto Pelà	Pre-Season All-ACC Team	August 13	
Nicholas Simmonds	Freshman of the Year	November 12	
George Gelnovatch	Coach of the Year	November 12	
Nicholas Simmonds	All-ACC First Team	November 12	
Nick Dang	All-ACC Second Team	November 12	
Casper Mols	All-ACC Second Team	November 12	
Umberto Pelà	All-ACC Second Team	November 12	
Sebastian Pop	All-ACC Third Team	November 12	
Zach Ehrenpreis	All-ACC Freshman Team	November 12	
Nicholas Simmonds	All-ACC Freshman Team	November 12	
Nicholas Simmonds	United Soccer Coaches All-American First Team	December 12	
Umberto Pelà	United Soccer Coaches All-American Second Team	December 12	

== Rankings ==
Ranking movements Legend: ██ Increase in ranking ██ Decrease in ranking RV = Received votes
	Week																
Poll	Pre	1	2	3	4	5	6	7	8	9	10	11	12	13	14	15	Final
United Soccer	17	11	RV	RV	RV	12	16	8	9	11	6	4	4	Not released			11
TopDrawer Soccer	17	11	24	24	7	3	8	3	2	5	2	2	2	9	21	21	21
