= Atlantic Coast Conference Men's Soccer Freshman of the Year =

ACC Men's Soccer Freshman of the Year
- Awarded for: the best freshman in the Atlantic Coast Conference
- Country: United States
- Presented by: Atlantic Coast Sports Media Association (1990–present)
- First award: 1990
- Currently held by: Jack Ottley, Duke

The Atlantic Coast Conference Men's Soccer Freshman of the Year is an annual award given to the best head coach in the Atlantic Coast Conference during the NCAA Division I men's soccer season. The award has been given since 1990.

Notable winners of the award include: Claudio Reyna (who captained the United States men's national soccer team from 1998 to 2007), Jay Heaps (known for his association with the New England Revolution as player and as coach), Paul Stalteri (Canadian regular, spending most of his career in Germany, most notably with Werder Bremen), Kyle Martino (better known as a color commentator for NBC Sports), and Patrick Mullins (two-time Hermann Trophy winner).

== Winners ==
=== Freshman of the Year (1990–present) ===
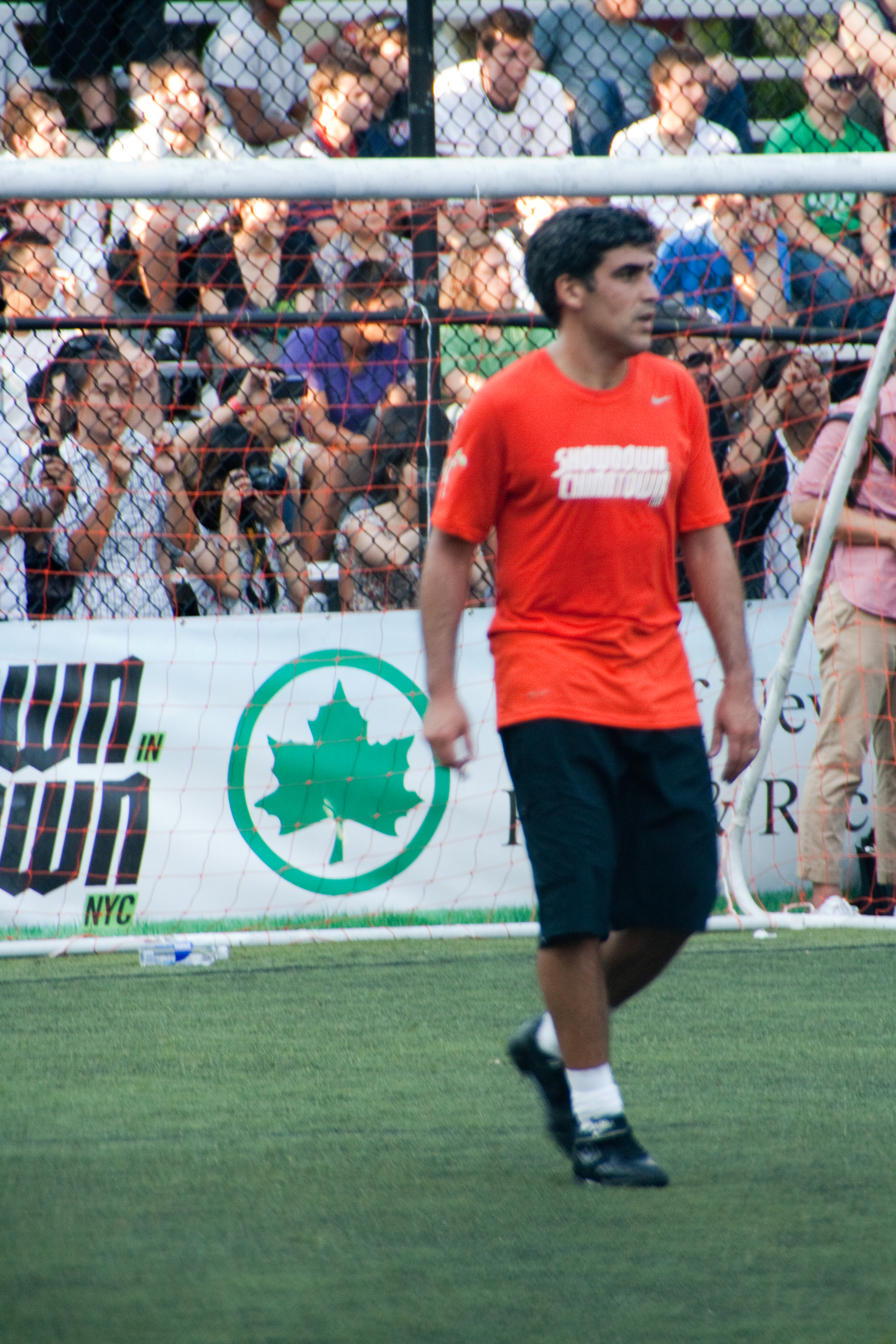
Claudio Reyna won the award in 1991, whilst playing for the University of Virginia.

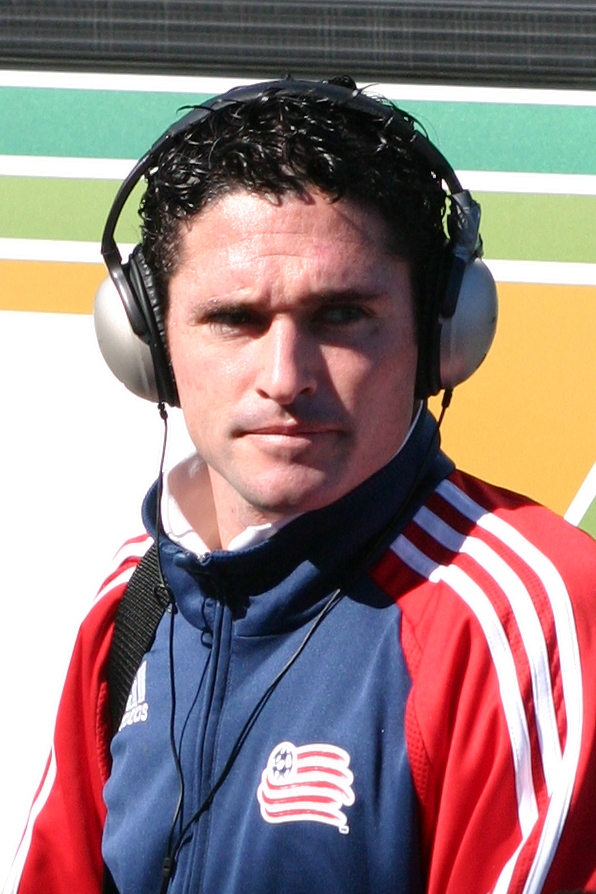
Jay Heaps won the award in 1995, whilst playing for Duke University.

Season	Player	School	Reference
1990	Jimmy Glenn	Clemson	
1991	Claudio Reyna	Virginia	
1992	Blas Cardozo	NC State	
1993	Temoc Suarez	North Carolina	
1994	Carey Talley	North Carolina	
1995	Jay Heaps	Duke	
1996	Paul Stalteri	Clemson	
1997	Jason Moore	Virginia	
1998	Chris Carrieri	North Carolina	
1999	Kyle Martino	Virginia	
2000	Alecko Eskandarian	Virginia	
2001	Marcus Storey	North Carolina	
2002	Justin Moose	Wake Forest	
2003	Jamie Watson	North Carolina	
2004	Michael Videira	Duke	
2005	Patrick Nyarko	Virginia Tech	
2006	Jeremy Hall	Maryland	
2007	Corben Bone	Wake Forest	
2008	Tony Tchani	Virginia	
2009	Andrew Wenger	Duke	
2010	Patrick Mullins	Maryland	
2011	Mikey Lopez	North Carolina	
2012	Danny Garcia	North Carolina	
2013	Zeiko Lewis	Boston College	
2014	Tim Kübel	Louisville	
2015	Jack Harrison	Wake Forest	
2016	Cam Lindley	North Carolina	
2017	Emanuel Perez	NC State	
2018	Issa Rayyan	Duke	
2019	Philip Mayaka	Clemson	
2020	Bertin Jacquesson	Pittsburgh	
2021	Shak Mohammed	Duke	
2022	Kamran Acito	Duke	
2023	Stephen Annor Gyamfi	Virginia	
2024	Ransford Gyan	Clemson	
2025	Nick Simmonds	Virginia	
2026	Jack Ottley	Duke	
