= Joe Ulrich =

American soccer player

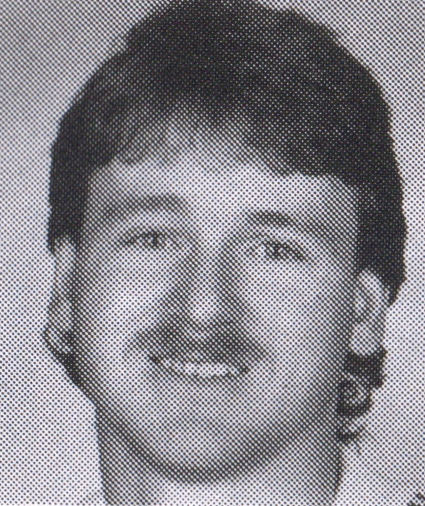
- Ulrich circa 1984

Personal information
- Full name: Joseph Ulrich
- Date of birth: January 9, 1961 (age 65)
- Place of birth: Poughkeepsie, New York, United States
- Height: 5 ft 9 in (1.75 m)
- Position: Defender

College career
| Years | Team | Apps | (Gls) |
| 1979–1980 | Ulster Community College | | |
| 1981–1982 | Duke Blue Devils | | |

Senior career*
| Years | Team | Apps | (Gls) |
| 1982–1984 | New York Arrows (indoor) | 65 | (8) |
| 1984–1985 | Dallas Sidekicks (indoor) | 16 | (2) |
- * Club domestic league appearances and goals

Joe Ulrich is a retired U.S. soccer defender. He won the 1982 Hermann Trophy as that year's top collegiate soccer player. He also played three seasons in the Major Indoor Soccer League.

== Youth and college ==
Ulrich attended Arlington High School. After graduating from high school, Ulrich played soccer at Ulster County Community College in New York for two years. In December 1980, he was selected by the Tampa Bay Rowdies in the first round of the North American Soccer League draft. Instead of signing with the Rowdies he continued his education and transferred to Duke University in 1981. While at Duke University, he played on the school's men's soccer team in 1981 and 1982. In 1981, he was named the ACC Player of the Year. In 1982, the Blue Devils went to the NCAA Championship game where it lost to Indiana in eight overtimes. That year, Ulrich won the Hermann Trophy as the top collegiate player of the year. In his two years at Duke, he scored 13 goals, despite playing as a defender. In 1999, Duke inducted Ulrich into its Athletic Hall of Fame.

== Professional ==
In December 1982, the Chicago Sting drafted Ulrich in the first round of the North American Soccer League draft, but did not sign Ulrich. That year, the New York Arrows drafted Ulrich in the first round (12th overall) of the Major Indoor Soccer League college draft. The Arrows signed Ulrich for $28,000 per year for two years. He spent two seasons with the Arrows, until they folded at the end of the 1983–1984 season. He then signed as a free agent with the Dallas Sidekicks on September 11, 1984. He appeared in only sixteen games with the Sidekicks during the 1984–1985 season before the team released him on March 7, 1985.

== Post-playing career ==
After retiring from playing professionally, Ulrich was hired by IBM.
