= 2025 Saint Louis Billikens men's soccer team =

American college soccer season

2025 Saint Louis Billikens men's soccer
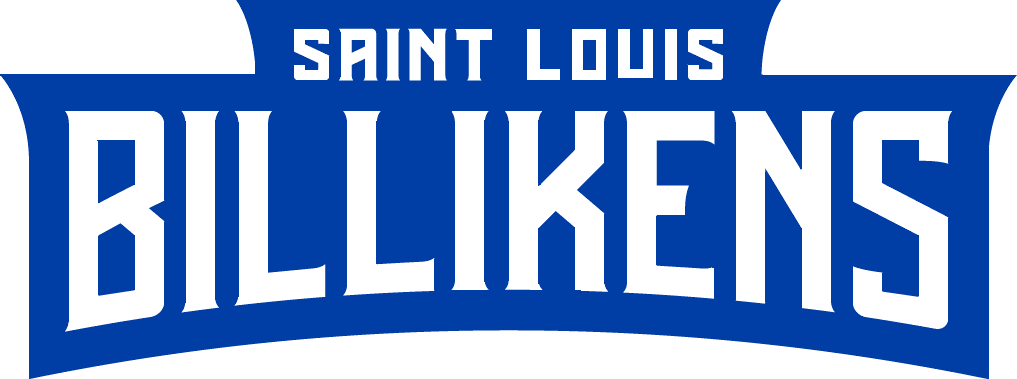

A-10 regular season & tournament champions

NCAA tournament, College Cup
- Conference: Atlantic 10 Conference
- U. Soc. Coaches poll: No. 4
- TopDrawerSoccer.com: No. 4
- Record: 13–3–8 (5–0–3 A-10)
- Head coach: Kevin Kalish (8th season)
- Assistant coaches: Kevin Stoll (8th season); Jack Roberts (3rd season)
- Goalkeepers coach: Carlos Tofern (3rd season)
- Home stadium: Hermann Stadium

2025 Atlantic 10 Conference men's soccer standings
	Conf.					Overall
Team	W		L		T	W		L		T
No. 22 Saint Louis †‡	5	–	0	–	3	13	–	3	–	8
Fordham	5	–	1	–	2	8	–	6	–	4
Dayton	4	–	1	–	3	8	–	2	–	8
Davidson	4	–	2	–	2	9	–	7	–	3
George Mason	4	–	2	–	2	7	–	6	–	3
VCU	3	–	2	–	3	6	–	6	–	5
Saint Joseph's	3	–	2	–	3	6	–	7	–	5
La Salle	2	–	2	–	4	4	–	5	–	8
Rhode Island	2	–	3	–	3	4	–	8	–	5
Loyola Chicago	1	–	3	–	4	4	–	5	–	7
Duquesne	2	–	6	–	0	8	–	6	–	2
St. Bonaventure	1	–	5	–	2	3	–	9	–	3
George Washington	0	–	7	–	1	2	–	11	–	4
† – Conference champion ‡ – 2025 Atlantic 10 tournament champion + – At-large invitation to the 2025 NCAA tournament; As of December 12, 2025; Rankings from United Soccer Coaches; Source: Atlantic 10

The 2025 Saint Louis Billikens men's soccer team represented Saint Louis University during the 2025 NCAA Division I men's soccer season. The Billikens played in the Atlantic 10 Conference, and played their home matches at Hermann Stadium and were coached by Kevin Kalish, in his eighth season in charge.

The 2025 season was the Billikens' most successful season of the 21st century. The Billikens won the "conference double" by winning both the regular season and tournament championship for the first time since 2022. Additionally, the Billikens reached the College Cup (semifinals) of the NCAA tournament for the first time since 1997 and for only the third time since their dynasty in the 1970s.

== Roster ==
As of 29 Dec 2025

Note: Flags indicate national team as defined under FIFA eligibility rules; some limited exceptions apply. Players may hold more than one non-FIFA nationality.

No.	Pos.	Nation	Player
0	GK	USA	Conor Dillman
2	DF	USA	Carlos Leatherman
3	DF	FIN	Gershon Henry
4	DF	USA	Quinten Blair
5	DF	USA	JC Cortez
6	DF	ENG	Sam Coughlan
7	FW	CIV	Abdoul Karim
8	MF	USA	Daven Barnett
9	MF	USA	Tanner Anderson
10	MF	USA	Braydon Seller
11	MF	USA	Xavi O'Neil
12	MF	USA	Jack DiMaria
13	DF	USA	Kai Jaeger
14	DF	USA	Grady Easton
15	DF	USA	Carter Knodle

No.	Pos.	Nation	Player
16	MF	USA	Braden Benyr
17	FW	USA	Andrew Heckenlaible
18	FW	BRA	Theo Franca
19	MF	USA	Drake Fournier
21	DF	USA	Jacksen McNeal
22	FW	USA	Jackson Delkus
23	MF	USA	Nick Schramm
24	MF	USA	Kavi Badh
25	DF	USA	Cole Ross
26	FW	USA	Axel Torres
27	MF	USA	Sam Kalish
28	GK	FRA	Jeremi Abonnel
29	GK	USA	Kyle Deming
30	GK	GER	Marcus Steinhaeuser

== Schedule ==
Date Time, TV	Rank^{#}	Opponent^{#}	Result	Record	Site (Attendance) City, State
Exhibitions
August 13*; 6:30 pm		at Notre Dame	T 1–1		Alumni Field; South Bend, IN
August 16*; 7:00 pm		DePaul	W 3–0		Hermann Stadium; St. Louis, MO
Non-conference regular season
August 21*; 7:00 pm, ESPN+		South Florida	T 0–0	0–0–1	Hermann Stadium (2,018); St. Louis, MO
August 24*; 7:30 pm, ESPN+		No. 5 SMU	W 1–0	1–0–1	Hermann Stadium (4,097); St. Louis, MO
August 30*; 7:00 pm, ESPN+	No. 18	No. 21 Seton Hall	W 1–0	2–0–1	Hermann Stadium (812); St. Louis, MO
September 3*; 7:00 pm, ESPN+	No. 16	at No. 4 Indiana	L 0–1	2–1–1	Bill Armstrong Stadium (2,746); Bloomington, IN
September 7*; 6:00 pm, ESPN+	No. 16	SIUE; Bronze Boot	W 2–1	3–1–1	Hermann Stadium (2,245); St. Louis, MO
September 12*; 7:00 pm, ESPN+	No. 24	No. 9 Portland	T 0–0	3–1–2	Hermann Stadium (1,573); St. Louis, MO
September 16*; 7:00 pm, ESPN+	No. 7	No. 24 Missouri State	T 1–1	3–1–3	Hermann Stadium (1,012); St. Louis, MO
September 20; 6:00 pm, ESPN+	No. 7	at Duquesne	W 1–0	4–1–3 (1–0)	Rooney Field (472); Pittsburgh, PA
September 23*; 6:00 pm, ESPNU	No. 8	at No. 17 Akron	L 0–3	4–2–3	FirstEnergy Stadium (1,329); Akron, OH
Atlantic-10 regular season
September 27; 6:30 pm, ESPN+	No. 21	La Salle; Homecoming	W 2–1	5–2–3 (2–0)	Hermann Stadium (4,472); St. Louis, MO
October 4; 7:00 pm, ESPN+	No. 21	Dayton; Alumni Night	T 0–0	5–2–4 (2–0–1)	Hermann Stadium (1,317); St. Louis, MO
October 8; 2:00 pm, ESPN+		at George Washington	W 2–0	6–2–4 (3–0–1)	Mount Vernon Athletic Field (130); Washington, DC
October 11; 6:00 pm, ESPN+		at VCU	W 2–0	7–2–4 (4–0–1)	Sports Backers Stadium (217); Richmond, VA
October 18; 6:00 pm, ESPN+	No. 20	Fordham	W 3–2	8–2–4 (5–0–1)	Hermann Stadium (216); St. Louis, MO
October 25; 3:00 pm, ESPN+	No. 16	at Loyola Chicago	T 1–1	8–2–5 (5–0–2)	Loyola Soccer Park (316); Chicago, IL
November 1; 6:00 pm, ESPN+	No. 22	Rhode Island	T 1–1	8–2–6	Hermann Stadium (407); St. Louis, MO
Atlantic-10 tournament
November 7; 7:00 pm, ESPN+	(1) No. 24	(8) La Salle; Quarterfinals	W 2–0	9–2–6	Hermann Stadium (1,003); St. Louis, MO
November 12; 7:00 pm, ESPN+	(1) No. 22	(4) Davidson; Semifinals	W 1–0	10–2–6	Hermann Stadium (873); St. Louis, MO
November 16; 12:00 pm, ESPN+	(1) No. 22	(3) Dayton; Semifinals	T 1–1 ^{W 5–4 PK}	10–2–7	Hermann Stadium (3,495); St. Louis, MO
NCAA tournament
November 16*; 12:00 pm, ESPN+	No. 22	No. 19 Kentucky; First round	W 2–1 ^{2OT}	11–2–7	Hermann Stadium (1,325); St. Louis, MO
November 23*; 12:00 pm, ESPN+	No. 22	at (6) No. 24 Indiana; Second round	W 1–0	12–2–7	Bill Armstrong Stadium (2,255); Bloomington, IN
November 30*; 5:00 pm, ESPN+	No. 22	at (11) No. 10 Bryant; Third round	T 2–2 ^{W 4–2 PK}	12–2–8	Beirne Stadium (1,400); Smithfield, RI
December 6*; 12:00 pm, ESPN+	No. 22	at (14) No. 12 Akron; Quarterfinals	W 3–2	13–2–8	FirstEnergy Stadium (1,918); Akron, OH
December 12*; 7:30 pm, ESPNU	No. 22	vs. (15) No. 11 NC State; College Cup semifinals	L 1–2	13–3–8	First Horizon Stadium (10,945); Cary, NC
*Non-conference game. ^{#}Rankings from United Soccer Coaches. (#) Tournament seedings in parentheses. All times are in Central Time.

== Rankings ==
Ranking movements Legend: ██ Increase in ranking ██ Decrease in ranking — = Not ranked RV = Received votes
	Week																	
Poll	Pre	1	2	3	4	5	6	7	8	9	10	11	12	13	14	15	16	Final
United Soccer	RV	RV	16	24	7	8	21	RV	20	16	22	24	22	Not released				4
TopDrawer Soccer	—	18	18	22	19	21	24	—	—	24	25	—	—	23	11	6	4	4
College Soccer News	RV	RV	15	15	11	10	15	18	18	16	16	23	25	21	Not released			4
