= Tim Brdaric =

German footballer

Tim Brdarić
Personal information
- Full name: Tim Thomas Brdaric
- Date of birth: 4 July 2000 (age 26)
- Place of birth: Düsseldorf, Germany
- Height: 1.95 m (6 ft 5 in)
- Position: Defender

Youth career
- Hannover 96
- -2016: VfL Wolfsburg
- 2016-2017: Fortuna Düsseldorf
- 2017-2018: Arminia Klosterhardt
- 2018-2019: Alemannia Aachen

Senior career*
Years	Team	Apps	(Gls)
2019–2020	Duquesne Dukes		
2020	1. FC Monheim	2	(0)
2021	Vllaznia	1	(1)
2021–2022	Rot-Weiß Koblenz	1	(0)
2022	KFC Uerdingen	14	(1)
2022–2023	SG Wattenscheid 09	26	(3)
2023–2024	Fortuna Köln	7	(0)
2023–2024	Fortuna Köln II	20	(2)
2024–2025	KFC Uerdingen	13	(0)
- * Club domestic league appearances and goals as of 25 January 2025

Tim Thomas Brdarić (born 4 July 2000) is a German professional footballer who last played as a defender for KFC Uerdingen.

== Career ==
In 2019, Brdaric trialled for American side Atlanta United.

Before the second half of the 2020–21 season, he signed for Vllaznia in the Albanian top flight after playing for German fifth division club 1. FC Monheim. On 18 April 2021, he debuted for Vllaznia during a 6–0 win over Apolonia. On 18 April 2021, Brdaric scored his first goal for Vllaznia during a 6–0 win over Apolonia.

On 4 August 2024, Brdaric joined newly-promoted Regionalliga West club KFC Uerdingen 05. He later terminated his contract.

== Personal life ==
He is the son of former Germany international Thomas Brdaric.
