= Ransford Gyan =

Ghanaian footballer

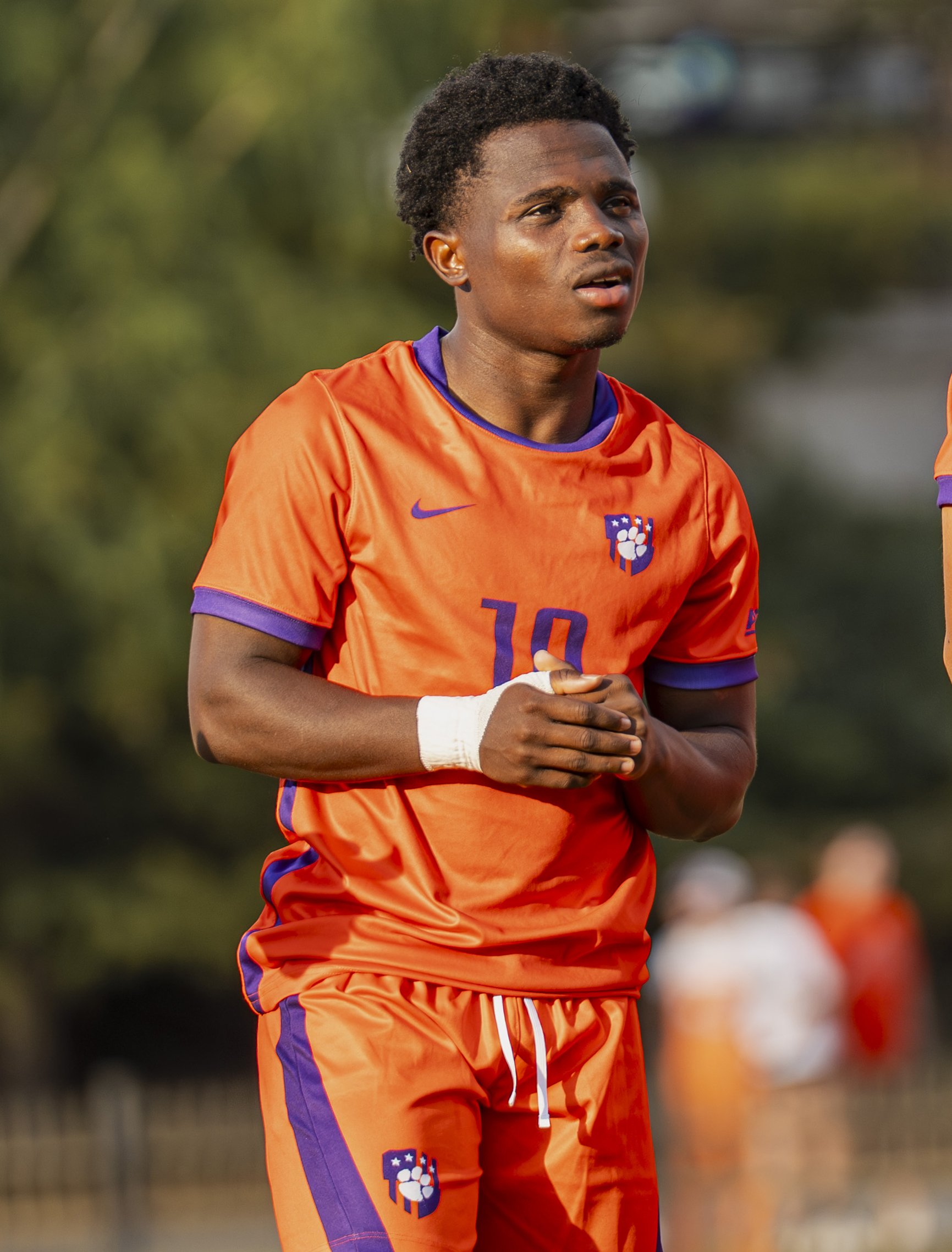
- Gyan with the Clemson Tigers in 2025

Personal information
- Full name: Ransford Gyan
- Date of birth: 29 March 2006 (age 20)
- Place of birth: Accra, Ghana
- Position: Forward

Team information
- Current team: Clemson Tigers
- Number: 20

Youth career
- 2017–2021: Cedar Stars Rush
- 2021–2024: St. Benedict's (NJ) Gray Bees

College career
Years	Team	Apps	(Gls)
2024–	Clemson Tigers	39	(13)

Ransford Gyan (born 29 March 2006) is a Ghanaian footballer who plays college soccer for Clemson University. Gyan is the 2023 and 2024 recipient of the Gatorade High School Soccer Player of the Year Award, an annual award for the best high school athletes in the nation.

== Career ==
=== Youth and high school ===
Gyan was born in Ghana and emigrated to the United States when he was a child. Gyan settled in Newark, New Jersey. Growing up he played for the Cedar Stars Rush academy teams before playing for St. Benedict's Preparatory School. During his junior, Gyan helped lead the team to a 17–0–0 record and a state championship, scoring 20 goals and providing 14 assists. In May 2023, he was named the New Jersey State Player of the Year for boys' soccer before earning the national player of the year award in June 2023.

In November 2023, Gyan verbally committed to play college soccer at Clemson University ahead of the 2024 NCAA Division I men's soccer season.

In 2024, Gyan won the Gatorade National Soccer Player of the Year award for the second consecutive season, becoming the first person in the award's history to consecutively win the award.

=== College ===
Gyan made his collegiate debut for Clemson on 22 August 2024, starting and playing 82 minutes in a 3–0 win against Penn State University. Gyan scored his first collegiate goal on 11 October 2024, in a 3–2 win at University of Louisville.

=== Club ===
New York City FC selected Gyan as the 27th overall pick in the first round of the 2026 MLS SuperDraft. Gyan returned for his junior year with Clemson.

== International career ==
Gyan is eligible for the Ghana national football team, and has been described as a future prospect for the team.
