= 2025 Southern Conference men's soccer tournament =

- Classification: Division I
- Teams: 6
- Matches: 5
- Attendance: 3,906
- Site: Campus Sites (1st & 2nd seed)
- Champions: Furman (16th title)
- Winning coach: Doug Allison (11th title)
- MVP: Diego Hernandez (Furman)
- Broadcast: ESPN+

2025 Southern Conference men's soccer standings
	Conf.					Overall
Team	W		L		T	W		L		T
No. 3 Furman †‡	4	–	0	–	1	16	–	2	–	5
Mercer	3	–	1	–	1	5	–	9	–	4
No. 14 UNCG +	3	–	2	–	0	12	–	5	–	6
ETSU	2	–	3	–	0	2	–	9	–	4
VMI	1	–	4	–	0	3	–	12	–	3
Wofford	1	–	4	–	0	6	–	11	–	2
† – Conference champion ‡– 2025 SoCon tournament Champion + – At-large invitation to the 2025 NCAA tournament; As of May 2, 202r Rankings from United Soccer Coaches; Source: SoCon

The 2025 Southern Conference men's soccer tournament was the postseason men's soccer tournament for the Southern Conference held from November 7 through November 16, 2025. The tournament was held at campus sites, with the higher seed hosting. The six-team single-elimination tournament consisted of three rounds based on seeding from regular season conference play. The Furman Paladins were the defending champions. Furman was able to defend its title, beating third seed UNC Greensboro 1–0 in the final. This was the sixteenth Southern Conference tournament title for the Furman men's soccer program. Eleven of their sixteen titles have come under head coach Doug Allison. As tournament champions, Furman earned the Southern Conference's automatic berth into the 2025 NCAA Division I men's soccer tournament.

== Seeding ==
All six Southern Conference men's soccer programs participated for the 2025 Tournament. Teams were seeded based on their regular season records. Tiebreakers were used to determine the seedings of teams who finished with identical conference records. A tiebreaker was required to determine the fifth and sixth seeds as Wofford and VMI both finished with 1–4–0 regular season records. The two teams met on October 4. Wofford prevailed 2–0, and earned the fifth seed.

Seed	School	Conference Record	Points
1	Furman	4–0–1	13
2	Mercer	3–1–1	10
3	UNC Greensboro	3–2–0	9
4	East Tennessee State	2–3–0	6
5	Wofford	1–4–0	3
6	VMI	1–4–0	3

== Bracket ==
Quarterfinals; Friday, Nov. 7
4	ETSU	1
5	Wofford	2 (a.e.t.)
3	UNC Greensboro	5
6	VMI	1

Semifinals; Sunday, Nov. 9
1	Furman	4
5	Wofford	2
2	Mercer	0
3	UNC Greensboro	2

Final; Sunday, Nov. 16
1	Furman	1 (a.e.t.)
3	UNC Greensboro	0

== Schedule ==
=== Quarterfinals ===
November 7, 2025	#4 ETSU	1–2 (a.e.t.)	#5 Wofford	Greenville, SC
4:00 p.m. EST	Nicola Brocca (yellow card) 29'; Henrique Cruz 38' (yellow card) 94'; Pablo Ramirez (yellow card) 50'	Report	(yellow card) 87' Nick Dyer; 88' Stewart Patnaud; 103' Declan Mettee	Stadium: Stone Soccer Stadium; Attendance: 147; Referee: David Erbacher; Assistant referees: Rick Rogers; Robert Dail; Fourth official: John Rush

November 7, 2025	#3 UNC Greensboro	5–1	#6 VMI	Macon, GA
7:00 p.m. EST	Enzo Dovlo 10'; Arnaud Tattevin 15', 19', 29'; Colton Sessoms 84'	Report	31' Jordan Savage; (yellow card) 82' Andres Fuentes-Ramos	Stadium: Betts Stadium; Attendance: 152; Referee: Kevin Maurer; Assistant referees: Khadime Sabara; Tyler Bost; Fourth official: Gunwan Park

=== Semifinals ===
November 9, 2025	#1 Furman	4–2	#5 Wofford	Greenville, SC
2:00 p.m. EST	Diego Hernandez 12' (pen.); Gianluca Rizzo 40'; Braden Dunham 54', 60'; Caleb Johnson (yellow card) 75'	Report	55' Samuel Byron; 82' Adam Celik	Stadium: Stone Soccer Stadium; Attendance: 887; Referee: John Matto; Assistant referees: Khadime Sabara; Tyler Bost; Fourth official: Eric Barnes

November 9, 2025	#2 Mercer	0–2	#3 UNC Greensboro	Macon, GA
7:00 p.m. EST	Fernando Arteaga (yellow card) 38'; Ehi Aimiuwu (yellow card) 62'; Tommy Redd (yellow card) 62'; Team (yellow card) 76'	Report	4' Téva Lossec; 57' Arnaud Tattevin	Stadium: Betts Stadium; Attendance: 702; Referee: Sorin Stoica; Assistant referees: Gunwan Park; Dean Morgan; Fourth official: Aleksandar Zhelyazkov

=== Final ===
November 16, 2025	#1 Furman	1–0 (a.e.t.)	#3 UNC Greensboro	Greenville, SC
2:00 p.m. EST	Gabe Cox (yellow card) 23'; Ryan Reid (yellow card) 65' (goal) 106'	Report	(yellow card) 56' Arnaud Tattevin; (yellow card) 67' Mohammed Sumaila; (yellow card) 95' Sami Lachekar	Stadium: Stone Soccer Stadium; Attendance: 2,018; Referee: Matthew Thompson; Assistant referees: Khadime Sabara; Tyler Bost; Fourth official: Eric Barnes

== Statistics ==
=== Goalscorers ===
There were 18 goals scored in 5 matches, for an average of 3.6 goals per match.

4 goals

- Arnaud Tattevin – UNC Greensboro

2 goals

- Braden Dunham – Furman

1 goal

- Samuel Byron – Wofford
- Adam Celik – Wofford
- Henrique Cruz – ETSU
- Enzo Dovlo – UNC Greensboro
- Diego Hernandez – Furman
- Téva Lossec – UNC Greensboro
- Declan Mettee – Wofford
- Stewart Patnaud – Wofford
- Ryan Reid – Furman
- Gianluca Rizzo – Furman
- Jordan Savage – VMI
- Colton Sessoms – UNC Greensboro

== All-Tournament team ==
Player	Team
Braden Dunham	Furman
Ivan Horvat	Furman
**Diego Hernandez**	Furman
Ryan Wagner	Furman
Daniel Longo	UNC Greensboro
Téva Lossec	UNC Greensboro
Arnaud Tattevin	UNC Greensboro
Declan Mettee	Wofford
Stewart Patnaud	Wofford
Manza Masamuna	Mercer
Tommy Redd	Mercer

MVP in bold
