= 2025 NCAA Division I men's soccer season =

American college soccer season

- Duration: August 21 – December 15, 2025
- Number of teams: 213
- Top goalscorer: 19 goals Donavan Phillip (NC State)

Statistics
- Biggest home win: 14 goals Boston College 14 – 0 Dean College; September 10
- Biggest away win: 7 goals Lindenwood 7 – 0 Chicago State; August 21
- Highest scoring: 14 goals Boston College 14 – 0 Dean College; September 10
- Longest winning run: 7 games, Multiple
- Longest unbeaten run: 16 games, Vermont (15–0–5) (November 1, 2024 – present)
- Longest winless run: 15 games Yale (0-13-2) (October 25, 2023 – present)
- Longest losing run: 6 games, Multiple

Tournament
- Duration: November 20 – December 15, 2025

Men's College Cup
- Date: December 12–15, 2025
- Site: WakeMed Soccer Park Cary, NC
- Champions: Washington
- Runners-up: NC State

Seasons
- ← 2024 2026 →

The 2025 NCAA Division I men's soccer season was the 67th season of NCAA championship men's college soccer. The season began on August 21, 2025, concluded on December 15, 2025. Vermont were the defending national champion.

The Washington Huskies defeated the NC State Wolfpack, 3–2, in extra time in the 2025 NCAA Division I men's soccer championship game. It was Washington's first ever National Championship.

== Changes from 2024 ==
=== Coaching changes ===
The following coaching changes have occurred during the 2024–25 offseason.

Program	Outgoing coach	Manner of departure	Date of vacancy	Incoming coach	Date of appointment	References
Air Force	Doug Hill	Retired	July 24, 2024	Greg Dalby	January 13, 2025	
Central Arkansas	Frank Kohlenstein	Retired	December 3, 2024	Kyle Segebart	December 3, 2024	
Coastal Carolina	Shaun Docking	Retired	August 13, 2025	Chris Fidler	August 13, 2025	
Eastern Illinois	Josh Oakley	Resigned	February 11, 2025	Ruy Vaz	February 14, 2025	
Florida Gulf Coast	Jesse Cormier	Contract not renewed	December 2, 2024	Oliver Twelvetrees	January 23, 2025	
Gonzaga	Aaron Lewis	Resigned	December 5, 2024	Chris McGaughey (Interim)	December 5, 2024	
Manhattan	Jorden Scott	Associate Director of Athletics	June 19, 2025	Tom Giovatto	July 10, 2025	
Oregon State	Greg Dalby	Hired by Air Force	January 13, 2025	Jarred Brookins	February 13, 2025	
Saint Joseph's	Don D'Ambra	Mutually Agreed to Part Ways	November 4, 2024	Tim Mulqueen	December 9, 2024	
St. Bonaventure	Kwame Oduro	Resigned	February 24, 2025	Mick Giordano	April 2, 2025	
UNC Asheville	Mick Giordano	Hired by St. Bonaventure	April 2, 2025	Danny Frid	May 6, 2025	
USC Upstate	Scott Halkett	Contract not renewed	November 8, 2024	Michael Antoniewicz	December 13, 2024	
Wofford	Joel Tyson	Hired by NC State	January 23, 2025	Ryan Osborne	March 5, 2025	

=== Conference realignment ===
Team	Conference in 2024	Conference in 2025
Delaware	CAA	Summit League
Missouri State	MVC	American
New Haven	NE-10 (D-II)	NEC
Seattle	WAC	WCC
UMass	Atlantic 10	Summit League
UTRGV	WAC	Independent

Team	Conference in 2025	Conference in 2026
Air Force	WAC	MW
Cal Poly	Big West	Pac-12 (Note: The Big West and Pac-12 Conferences entered into a single-sport partnership that will see four full Big West members—Cal Poly, California Baptist (joining the BWC in 2026), UC Riverside, and UC San Diego—become Pac-12 men's soccer members in 2026.)
California Baptist	WAC	Pac-12
Denver	Summit	WCC
Grand Canyon	WAC	MW
Gonzaga	WCC	Pac-12
Liberty	OVC	SoCon
Northern Illinois	MVC	Horizon
Oregon State	WCC	Pac-12
Saint Francis	NEC	PAC (D-III)
San Diego State	WAC	Pac-12
San Jose State	WAC	MW
UC Davis	Big West	MW
UC Riverside	Big West	Pac-12
UC San Diego	Big West	Pac-12
UNLV	WAC	MW
UTRGV	Independent	OVC
Utah Tech	WAC	MW
Utah Valley	WAC	Big West

== New programs ==
On May 6, the Northeast Conference announced that New Haven of the Division II Northeast-10 Conference had accepted an invitation to join the conference and begin the transition to Division I. The Chargers started play in the NEC this year, and will become full Division I members in the 2028–29 season.

== Other news ==
- February 27 – The Horizon League announced that Northern Illinois, which had been a Horizon member from 1991–1994, would rejoin as a full member in 2026. Men's soccer will move from the Missouri Valley Conference (MVC).
- March 19 – The Big West Conference announced that California Baptist would join from the Western Athletic Conference (WAC) in 2026.
- March 25 – Saint Francis announced that its athletic programs would move to Division III at the conclusion of the 2025–26 academic year, and join the Presidents' Athletic Conference (PAC).
- April 25 – The University of Kentucky (UK) board of trustees approved a proposal to transfer the UK athletic program to a separate though related non-profit company known as Champions Blue, LLC. Both UK and outside media characterized the move, believed to be the first of its type by a major university, as a reaction to the then-impending settlement of the House v. NCAA legal case, which ultimately led to a formal revenue-sharing arrangement between athletic programs and student-athletes.
- April 29 – The Southern Conference (SoCon) announced that current Ohio Valley Conference (OVC) affiliate Liberty would become a SoCon affiliate in 2026.
- April 30 – The OVC announced that UTRGV would become an OVC affiliate in 2026, after a single season as a men's soccer independent.
- June 4 – The Big West announced that Utah Valley would join from the WAC in 2026.
- June 26 – The Atlantic Sun Conference (ASUN) and WAC announced announced a strategic alliance under which the WAC will rebrand as the United Athletic Conference (UAC) in 2026. At that time, the WAC will rebrand as the UAC, with its future full membership consisting of all ASUN and WAC members that offer football scholarships plus non-football UT Arlington. The full ASUN membership going forward will consist of schools that either do not sponsor football or do not offer football scholarships.
- July 21 – The American Athletic Conference announced a name change to the American Conference as part of a comprehensive rebranding strategy. The conference no longer uses an initialism, opting for "American" as its short form.
- September 3 – The West Coast Conference (WCC) announced that UC San Diego would join from the Big West Conference in 2027.
- October 2 – The Northeast Conference adopted its longstanding abbreviation of NEC as its official name.\
- October 29 – The Mountain West Conference (MW) announced it would sponsor men's soccer in the 2026 season. The inaugural lineup is:
  - Current full members Air Force, Grand Canyon, San Jose State, and UNLV, all of which are moving men's soccer from the WAC.
  - Incoming full member UC Davis, arriving from the Big West.
  - Incoming affiliate Utah Tech, also moving men's soccer from the WAC.
- October 31 – The WCC announced that Denver would join from the Summit League in 2026.

== Rankings ==
=== Preseason polls ===
United Soccer Coaches
Rank	Team
1	Vermont
2	Marshall
3	Ohio State
4	Denver
5	SMU
6	Wake Forest
7	Pittsburgh
8	UMass
9	Clemson
10	San Diego
11	Indiana
12	Dayton
13	Stanford
14	NC State
15	Duke
16	West Virginia
17	Virginia
18	Kansas City
19	Penn
20	Western Michigan
21	Akron
22	Cornell
23	Hofstra
24	Missouri State
25	Georgetown

Top Drawer Soccer
Rank	Team
1	Vermont
2	Wake Forest
3	Denver
4	Ohio State
5	Pittsburgh
6	Marshall
7	SMU
8	Dayton
9	San Diego
10	Stanford
11	Clemson
12	Cornell
13	Kansas City
14	Georgetown
15	Duke
16	West Virginia
17	Virginia
18	Indiana
19	NC State
20	Furman
21	Penn
22	Missouri State
23	UNC Greensboro
24	High Point
25	Western Michigan

College Soccer News
Rank	Team
1	Marshall
2	Vermont
3	Denver
4	Wake Forest
5	Pittsburgh
6	SMU
7	Clemson
8	Georgetown
9	Ohio State
10	Stanford
11	West Virginia
12	Indiana
13	Duke
14	Dayton
15	San Diego
16	NC State
17	Missouri State
18	Hofstra
19	UMass
20	Western Michigan
21	Penn
22	Kansas City
23	Cornell
24	UCLA
25	Washington

== Regular season ==
=== Major upsets ===
In this list, a "major upset" is defined as a game won by an unranked team that defeats a ranked team, or a team ranked 10 spots lower than the other team.

All rankings are from the United Soccer Coaches Poll. Home team is shown in italics.

Date	Winner	Score	Loser
August 21	Virginia Tech	1–0	No. 3 Ohio State
August 24	Saint Louis	1–0	No. 5 SMU
August 28	George Mason	4–1	No. 11 Virginia
August 28	Notre Dame	1–0	No. 14 Oregon State
August 28	San Diego	3–2	No. 21 Denver
August 28	San Francisco	2–1	No. 17 California
August 29	Georgetown	1–0	No. 3 Pittsburgh
September 1	College of Charleston	2–0	No. 15 North Carolina
September 4	North Florida	5–0	No. 19 Florida Atlantic
September 5	Louisville	1–0	No. 1 Stanford
September 6	Bryant	1–0	No. 20 UMass
September 9	VCU	2–1	No. 2 Clemson
September 12	Furman	4–1	No. 7 Gardner–Webb
September 13	Michigan	3–2	No. 1 Indiana
September 13	No. 13 Vermont	1–0	No. 3 Akron
September 13	Virginia	1–0	No. 6 Louisville
September 13	South Carolina	2–1	No. 11 UNC Greensboro
September 14	Boston College	1–0	No. 14 Virginia Tech
September 16	Queens	1–0	No. 14 Clemson
September 16	College of Charleston	1–0	No. 15 Furman
September 19	Virginia	6–3	No. 1 Wake Forest
September 19	UConn	3–1	No. 10 Akron
September 19	Notre Dame	3–0	No. 12 Louisville
September 22	Cal Baptist	2–0	No. 20 UC Irvine
September 23	Michigan State	1–0	No. 3 Indiana
September 23	Akron	3–0	No. 8 Saint Louis
September 23	Georgetown	5–2	No. 25 George Mason
September 26	Michigan State	2–1	No. 5 Michigan
September 26	Clemson	4–3	No. 13 Wake Forest
September 27	SMU	2–0	No. 21 Notre Dame
September 27	Villanova	2–1	No. 22 UConn
September 27	Boston U	3–2	No. 24 Bucknell
September 28	No. 19 Georgia Southern	2–1	No. 4 Marshall
October 1	Fairfield	5–1	No. 17 Marist
October 3	Washington	3–0	No. 12 Indiana
October 3	St. John's	2–1	No. 19 Akron
October 4	East Tennessee State	2–1	No. 10 UNC Greensboro
October 4	Niagara	2–1	No. 17 Marist
October 7	Denver	2–1	No. 14 Georgetown
October 8	No. 23 UNC Greensboro	2–0	No. 5 High Point
October 8	VCU	2–1	No. 24 George Mason
October 10	UCF	3–0	No. 11 Georgia Southern
October 11	Syracuse	2–0	No. 25 SMU
October 15	UAB	2–1	No. 17 North Carolina
October 17	Clemson	3–0	No. 10 Duke
October 17	Charlotte	1–0	No. 22 Florida Atlantic
October 18	Georgia State	2–1	No. 3 West Virginia
October 24	Florida International	1–0	No. 24 Charlotte
October 25	Santa Clara	1–0	No. 5 Portland
October 25	Furman	2–0	No. 18 UNC Greensboro
October 25	Syracuse	1–0	No. 22 North Carolina
October 26	No. 25 Kentucky	1–0	No. 10 West Virginia
October 31	California	1–0	No. 1 Stanford
October 31	Northwestern	2–0	No. 17 Indiana
November 7	UCLA	4–2	No. 15 Washington
November 7	UConn	2–1	No. 21 Seton Hall
November 9	Syracuse	3–0	No. 5 NC State
November 9	SMU	1–0	No. 7 Stanford
November 9	Stony Brook	2–1	No. 22 Hofstra
November 12	UCLA	2–0	No. 1 Maryland
November 12	UCF	1–0	No. 18 Kentucky
November 13	UConn	2–1	No. 19 Akron
November 15	Denver	4–2	No. 25 Kansas City

=== Conference standings ===
2025 ACC men's soccer standings
	Conf.					Overall
Team	W		L		T	W		L		T
No. 11 Virginia †+	5	–	0	–	3	12	–	2	–	5
No. 9 Stanford +	5	–	2	–	1	14	–	4	–	2
No. 2 NC State +	4	–	1	–	3	16	–	3	–	4
Clemson +	4	–	2	–	2	8	–	6	–	3
Duke +	4	–	2	–	2	10	–	4	–	6
Syracuse +	4	–	3	–	1	9	–	8	–	3
No. 15 SMU ‡	3	–	2	–	3	11	–	5	–	4
Notre Dame +	3	–	3	–	2	9	–	7	–	4
North Carolina +	2	–	2	–	4	9	–	5	–	6
Wake Forest	2	–	3	–	3	7	–	4	–	6
Virginia Tech	2	–	3	–	3	7	–	4	–	5
California	2	–	5	–	1	8	–	8	–	2
Pittsburgh	1	–	4	–	3	6	–	7	–	5
Louisville	1	–	5	–	2	5	–	7	–	5
Boston College	1	–	6	–	1	7	–	9	–	1
† – Conference champion ‡ – ACC tournament champion + – At-large invitation to the 2025 NCAA tournament; As of May 2, 2026; Rankings from United Soccer Coaches; Source:The ACC

2025 America East Conference men's soccer standings
	Conf.					Overall
Team	W		L		T	W		L		T
No. 13 Vermont †‡	6	–	0	–	1	14	–	1	–	5
No. 10 Bryant +	6	–	1	–	0	17	–	2	–	3
Albany	3	–	2	–	2	5	–	6	–	6
New Hampshire	3	–	3	–	1	5	–	8	–	5
UMBC	2	–	3	–	2	6	–	6	–	5
UMass Lowell	2	–	3	–	2	7	–	7	–	4
NJIT	1	–	4	–	2	3	–	9	–	5
Binghamton	0	–	7	–	0	4	–	13	–	0
† – Conference champion ‡ – AmEast tournament champion + – At-large invitation to the 2025 NCAA tournament; As of May 2, 2026; Rankings from United Soccer Coaches; Source: America East

2025 American Conference men's soccer standings
	Conf.					Overall
Team	W		L		T	W		L		T
Charlotte †	5	–	1	–	2	8	–	4	–	4
Florida Atlantic †‡	5	–	1	–	2	12	–	4	–	2
South Florida	5	–	2	–	1	9	–	3	–	5
FIU	4	–	4	–	0	7	–	9	–	3
Missouri State	3	–	3	–	2	6	–	6	–	4
Tulsa	3	–	3	–	2	5	–	9	–	4
UAB	3	–	4	–	1	6	–	7	–	2
Memphis	3	–	5	–	0	4	–	8	–	3
Temple	0	–	8	–	0	1	–	13	–	2
† – Conference champion ‡ – American tournament champion + – At-large invitation to the 2025 NCAA tournament; As of December 6, 2025; Rankings from United Soccer Coaches; Source: The American

2025 ASUN Conference men's soccer standings
	Conf.					Overall
Team	W		L		T	W		L		T
Gold
Bellarmine †	3	–	1	–	2	8	–	4	–	5
Central Arkansas	3	–	2	–	1	4	–	10	–	2
Lipscomb	1	–	2	–	3	2	–	9	–	6
Queens	0	–	2	–	4	5	–	6	–	6
Graphite
North Florida †‡	4	–	2	–	0	12	–	5	–	2
Jacksonville	2	–	2	–	2	6	–	7	–	5
Stetson	2	–	3	–	1	6	–	8	–	3
Florida Gulf Coast	2	–	3	–	1	6	–	7	–	3
† – Conference champion ‡ – 2025 ASUN tournament champion + – At-large invitation to the 2025 NCAA tournament; As of December 6, 2025; Rankings from United Soccer Coaches; Source: ASUN

2025 Atlantic 10 Conference men's soccer standings
	Conf.					Overall
Team	W		L		T	W		L		T
No. 4 Saint Louis †‡	5	–	0	–	3	13	–	3	–	8
Fordham	5	–	1	–	2	8	–	6	–	4
Dayton	4	–	1	–	3	8	–	2	–	8
Davidson	4	–	2	–	2	9	–	7	–	3
George Mason	4	–	2	–	2	7	–	6	–	3
VCU	3	–	2	–	3	6	–	6	–	5
Saint Joseph's	3	–	2	–	3	6	–	7	–	5
La Salle	2	–	2	–	4	4	–	5	–	8
Rhode Island	2	–	3	–	3	4	–	8	–	5
Loyola Chicago	1	–	3	–	4	4	–	5	–	7
Duquesne	2	–	6	–	0	8	–	6	–	2
St. Bonaventure	1	–	5	–	2	3	–	9	–	3
George Washington	0	–	7	–	1	2	–	11	–	4
† – Conference champion ‡ – 2025 Atlantic 10 tournament champion + – At-large invitation to the 2025 NCAA tournament; As of May 2, 2026; Rankings from United Soccer Coaches; Source: Atlantic 10

2025 Big East Conference men's soccer standings
	Conf.					Overall
Team	W		L		T	W		L		T
East
No. 5 Georgetown †‡	6	–	0	–	2	14	–	4	–	4
No. 25 UConn +	5	–	2	–	1	12	–	5	–	4
Providence	4	–	2	–	2	6	–	7	–	3
Seton Hall +	3	–	1	–	4	7	–	4	–	8
St. John's +	3	–	3	–	2	9	–	6	–	4
Villanova	2	–	3	–	3	7	–	6	–	5
Midwest
No. 12 Akron †+	5	–	2	–	1	13	–	5	–	3
Creighton	4	–	2	–	2	8	–	4	–	4
Butler	2	–	4	–	2	5	–	10	–	2
Xavier	1	–	4	–	3	5	–	6	–	4
Marquette	1	–	7	–	0	7	–	7	–	2
DePaul	0	–	6	–	2	2	–	8	–	7
† – Conference champion ‡ – 2025 Big East tournament champion + – At-large invitation to the 2025 NCAA tournament; As of May 2, 2026; Rankings from United Soccer Coaches; Source: Big East

2025 Big South Conference men's soccer standings
	Conf.					Overall
Team	W		L		T	W		L		T
No. 16 High Point †‡	7	–	0	–	0	14	–	2	–	4
Gardner–Webb	5	–	1	–	1	13	–	3	–	2
Presbyterian	3	–	3	–	1	7	–	8	–	5
UNC Asheville	3	–	3	–	1	7	–	7	–	2
USC Upstate	2	–	3	–	2	5	–	11	–	3
Radford	1	–	4	–	2	2	–	11	–	4
Longwood	1	–	4	–	2	3	–	8	–	5
Winthrop	1	–	4	–	2	1	–	12	–	3
† – Conference champion ‡ – 2025 Big South tournament champion + – At-large invitation to the 2025 NCAA tournament; As of May 2, 2026; Rankings from United Soccer Coaches; Source: Big South

2025 Big Ten Conference men's soccer standings
	Conf.						Overall
Team	W		L		T	PCT	W		L		T	PCT
No. 7 Maryland ‍†‍‍^{y}	8	–	0	–	2	.900	13	–	2	–	4	.789
No. 1 Washington ‍‍‍^{y}	7	–	3	–	0	.700	16	–	6	–	2	.708
Michigan ‍‍‍^{y}	6	–	2	–	3	.682	12	–	4	–	4	.700
UCLA ‍‍‡‍^{y}	5	–	3	–	2	.600	8	–	6	–	5	.553
No. 22 Indiana ‍‍‍^{y}	5	–	5	–	0	.500	12	–	6	–	1	.658
Wisconsin ‍‍‍	4	–	6	–	0	.400	8	–	8	–	0	.500
Northwestern ‍‍‍	3	–	5	–	2	.400	8	–	6	–	3	.559
Rutgers ‍‍‍	3	–	5	–	2	.400	8	–	6	–	3	.559
Ohio State ‍‍‍	3	–	7	–	0	.300	6	–	10	–	0	.375
Michigan State ‍‍‍	2	–	5	–	3	.350	5	–	8	–	3	.406
Penn State ‍‍‍	1	–	6	–	3	.250	5	–	8	–	4	.412
† – Conference champion ‡ – 2025 B1G tournament champion y – Invited to the 2025 NCAA Tournament; As of May 2, 2026; Rankings from United Soccer Coaches; Source: Big Ten

2025 Big West Conference men's soccer standings
	Conf.					Overall
Team	W		L		T	W		L		T
UCSB †	4	–	0	–	5	7	–	5	–	8
UC Irvine †‡	4	–	0	–	5	11	–	4	–	6
Cal Poly †	5	–	2	–	2	9	–	6	–	5
Cal State Fullerton	5	–	3	–	1	8	–	6	–	6
UC Davis	4	–	3	–	2	4	–	9	–	6
UC San Diego	2	–	2	–	5	2	–	9	–	7
Cal State Bakersfield	3	–	4	–	2	3	–	11	–	3
UC Riverside	2	–	6	–	1	4	–	9	–	4
CSUN	1	–	5	–	3	6	–	6	–	6
Sacramento State	1	–	6	–	2	2	–	12	–	4
† – Conference champion ‡ – 2025 Big West tournament champion + – At-large invitation to the 2025 NCAA tournament; As of December 6, 2025; Rankings from United Soccer Coaches; Source: Big West

2025 Coastal Athletic Association men's soccer standings
	Conf.					Overall
Team	W		L		T	W		L		T
North
No. 20 Hofstra †+	7	–	1	–	0	14	–	5	–	1
Stony Brook	4	–	3	–	1	9	–	5	–	5
Monmouth	2	–	3	–	3	5	–	8	–	3
Drexel	2	–	5	–	1	4	–	6	–	6
Northeastern	2	–	5	–	1	4	–	7	–	4
South
Elon †‡	4	–	1	–	3	9	–	3	–	7
Campbell	4	–	2	–	2	10	–	6	–	4
UNCW	4	–	4	–	0	5	–	9	–	2
Charleston	3	–	3	–	2	6	–	8	–	3
William & Mary	1	–	6	–	1	2	–	10	–	4
† – Conference champion ‡ – 2025 CAA tournament champion + – At-large invitation to the 2025 NCAA tournament; As of May 26, 2026; Rankings from United Soccer Coaches; Source: CAA

2025 Horizon League men's soccer standings
	Conf.					Overall
Team	W		L		T	W		L		T
Cleveland State †‡	5	–	1	–	3	9	–	4	–	6
Purdue Fort Wayne	5	–	2	–	2	8	–	3	–	6
Green Bay	5	–	3	–	1	9	–	7	–	2
Milwaukee	3	–	1	–	5	4	–	7	–	8
Robert Morris	3	–	1	–	5	6	–	4	–	7
Oakland	3	–	3	–	3	3	–	9	–	6
IU Indy	3	–	5	–	1	6	–	8	–	3
Detroit Mercy	2	–	5	–	2	5	–	10	–	3
Northern Kentucky	2	–	5	–	2	4	–	10	–	3
Wright State	2	–	7	–	0	2	–	13	–	1
† – Conference champion ‡ – 2025 Horizon tournament champion + – At-large invitation to the 2025 NCAA tournament; As of December 6, 2025; Rankings from United Soccer Coaches; Source: Horizon

2025 Ivy League men's soccer standings
	Conf.					Overall
Team	W		L		T	W		L		T
No. 8 Princeton †‡	7	–	0	–	0	15	–	2	–	2
Cornell +	5	–	1	–	1	14	–	4	–	2
Penn	3	–	2	–	2	8	–	5	–	4
Harvard	2	–	3	–	2	6	–	6	–	5
Brown	2	–	4	–	1	6	–	7	–	2
Yale	2	–	4	–	1	3	–	9	–	3
Dartmouth	2	–	5	–	0	3	–	8	–	3
Columbia	1	–	5	–	1	3	–	8	–	4
† – Conference champion ‡ – 2025 Ivy League tournament champion + – At-large invitation to the 2025 NCAA tournament; As of May 2, 2026; Rankings from United Soccer Coaches; Source: Ivy League

2025 Metro Atlantic Athletic Conference men's soccer standings
	Conf.					Overall
Team	W		L		T	W		L		T
Sacred Heart †‡	7	–	0	–	3	9	–	4	–	5
Siena	6	–	1	–	3	9	–	5	–	5
Iona	6	–	1	–	3	9	–	4	–	5
Fairfield	5	–	1	–	4	8	–	5	–	5
Niagara	5	–	4	–	1	8	–	7	–	1
Quinnipiac	5	–	5	–	0	7	–	10	–	1
Marist	4	–	4	–	2	8	–	4	–	4
Manhattan	3	–	4	–	3	4	–	8	–	4
Mount St. Mary's	3	–	6	–	1	3	–	9	–	5
Canisius	3	–	7	–	0	5	–	10	–	1
Merrimack	2	–	6	–	2	4	–	9	–	3
Saint Peter's	2	–	7	–	1	4	–	10	–	2
Rider	1	–	6	–	3	2	–	11	–	4
† – Conference champion ‡ – 2025 MAAC tournament champion + – At-large invitation to the 2025 NCAA tournament; As of December 6, 2025; Rankings from United Soccer Coaches; Source: MAAC

2025 Missouri Valley Conference men's soccer standings
	Conf.					Overall
Team	W		L		T	W		L		T
Evansville †	3	–	1	–	3	7	–	5	–	8
Drake †	3	–	1	–	3	8	–	2	–	7
Northern Illinois †	3	–	1	–	3	8	–	5	–	4
Belmont	3	–	2	–	2	8	–	3	–	6
UIC	2	–	1	–	4	10	–	3	–	5
Western Michigan ‡	2	–	2	–	3	8	–	10	–	4
Bowling Green	1	–	4	–	2	5	–	8	–	4
Bradley	0	–	5	–	2	2	–	9	–	6
† – Conference champion ‡ – 2025 MVC Tournament champion + – At-large invitation to the 2025 NCAA tournament; As of December 6, 2025; Rankings from United Soccer Coaches; Source: MVC

2025 Northeast Conference men's soccer standings
	Conf.					Overall
Team	W		L		T	W		L		T
Fairleigh Dickinson †‡	7	–	1	–	1	13	–	5	–	3
Saint Francis (PA)	7	–	2	–	0	8	–	9	–	1
LIU	5	–	1	–	3	8	–	3	–	7
Le Moyne ^{#}	4	–	3	–	2	5	–	10	–	2
New Haven ^{#}	3	–	3	–	3	5	–	5	–	6
Stonehill	3	–	3	–	3	5	–	10	–	3
Howard	3	–	5	–	1	5	–	11	–	2
Mercyhurst ^{#}	3	–	5	–	1	3	–	10	–	4
Central Connecticut	1	–	7	–	1	1	–	14	–	2
Chicago State	1	–	7	–	1	1	–	15	–	1
† – Conference champion ‡ – 2025 NEC tournament champion + – At-large invitation to the 2025 NCAA tournament ^{#} – Ineligible for post-season (In transition); As of December 6, 2025; Rankings from United Soccer Coaches; Source: NEC

2025 Ohio Valley Conference men's soccer standings
	Conf.					Overall
Team	W		L		T	W		L		T
Lindenwood †‡	6	–	2	–	2	14	–	3	–	4
Houston Christian	5	–	3	–	2	11	–	5	–	3
Liberty	4	–	2	–	4	9	–	5	–	6
SIU Edwardsville	4	–	4	–	2	6	–	11	–	2
Western Illinois	3	–	3	–	4	5	–	11	–	4
Eastern Illinois	3	–	4	–	3	4	–	9	–	4
Southern Indiana	1	–	4	–	5	2	–	10	–	5
Incarnate Word	1	–	5	–	4	5	–	7	–	6
† – Conference champion ‡ – 2025 Ohio Valley tournament champion + – At-large invitation to the 2025 NCAA tournament; As of December 6, 2025; Rankings from United Soccer Coaches; Source: OVC

2025 Patriot League men's soccer standings
	Conf.					Overall
Team	W		L		T	W		L		T
American †	7	–	1	–	1	8	–	8	–	2
Lehigh	5	–	1	–	3	9	–	5	–	6
Army	5	–	3	–	1	7	–	6	–	5
Boston U	5	–	4	–	0	10	–	8	–	0
Bucknell	4	–	2	–	3	9	–	4	–	5
Lafayette ‡	3	–	2	–	4	8	–	7	–	7
Loyola (MD)	2	–	5	–	2	3	–	10	–	3
Colgate	1	–	4	–	4	5	–	7	–	5
Holy Cross	1	–	5	–	3	4	–	8	–	6
Navy	0	–	6	–	3	3	–	8	–	7
† – Conference champion ‡ – 2025 Patriot League tournament champion + – At-large invitation to the 2025 NCAA tournament; As of December 6, 2025; Rankings from United Soccer Coaches; Source: Patriot League

2025 Southern Conference men's soccer standings
	Conf.					Overall
Team	W		L		T	W		L		T
No. 3 Furman †‡	4	–	0	–	1	16	–	2	–	5
Mercer	3	–	1	–	1	5	–	9	–	4
No. 14 UNCG +	3	–	2	–	0	12	–	5	–	6
ETSU	2	–	3	–	0	2	–	9	–	4
VMI	1	–	4	–	0	3	–	12	–	3
Wofford	1	–	4	–	0	6	–	11	–	2
† – Conference champion ‡– 2025 SoCon tournament Champion + – At-large invitation to the 2025 NCAA tournament; As of May 2, 202r Rankings from United Soccer Coaches; Source: SoCon

2025 Summit League men's soccer standings
	Conf.					Overall
Team	W		L		T	W		L		T
No. 25 Kansas City †+	4	–	1	–	1	12	–	4	–	5
Denver †‡	4	–	1	–	1	12	–	7	–	3
Delaware	3	–	1	–	2	12	–	2	–	3
St. Thomas	1	–	3	–	2	7	–	5	–	5
UMass	1	–	3	–	2	6	–	5	–	6
Oral Roberts	1	–	3	–	2	4	–	10	–	3
Omaha	1	–	3	–	2	3	–	9	–	4
† – Conference champion ‡ – Summit League tournament champion + – At-large invitation to the 2025 NCAA tournament; As of May 2, 2026; Rankings from United Soccer Coaches; Source: Summit

2025 Sun Belt Conference men's soccer standings
	Conf.					Overall
Team	W		L		T	W		L		T
Kentucky †+	7	–	1	–	1	10	–	4	–	5
No. 23 West Virginia +	7	–	2	–	0	13	–	5	–	3
No. 17 Marshall +	6	–	2	–	1	12	–	4	–	5
Georgia Southern	6	–	3	–	0	13	–	4	–	1
UCF ‡	4	–	3	–	2	10	–	7	–	3
Georgia State	2	–	4	–	3	4	–	8	–	6
Old Dominion	1	–	3	–	5	5	–	5	–	8
Coastal Carolina	2	–	6	–	1	3	–	9	–	2
South Carolina	1	–	6	–	2	7	–	9	–	2
James Madison	0	–	6	–	3	1	–	10	–	5
† – Conference champion ‡ – 2025 Sun Belt Conference tournament champion + – At-large invitation to the 2025 NCAA tournament; As of December 6, 2025; Rankings from United Soccer Coaches; Source: Sun Belt

2025 West Coast Conference men's soccer standings
	Conf.					Overall
Team	W		L		T	W		L		T
No. 18 San Diego †‡	7	–	1	–	1	13	–	3	–	3
No. 6 Portland +	6	–	1	–	2	14	–	2	–	4
No. 19 Oregon State +	6	–	1	–	2	10	–	5	–	2
San Francisco	5	–	4	–	0	10	–	6	–	1
Santa Clara	3	–	3	–	3	6	–	5	–	7
Seattle U	2	–	4	–	3	4	–	7	–	6
Loyola Marymount	1	–	3	–	5	5	–	6	–	7
Gonzaga	2	–	5	–	2	5	–	8	–	3
Saint Mary's (CA)	2	–	5	–	2	2	–	8	–	6
Pacific	1	–	8	–	0	4	–	14	–	0
† – Conference champion ‡– Automatic qualifier to NCAA tournament + – At-large invitation to the 2025 NCAA tournament; As of May 2, 2026; Rankings from United Soccer Coaches; Source: WCC

2025 Western Athletic Conference men's soccer standings
	Conf.					Overall
Team	W		L		T	W		L		T
Cal Baptist †	4	–	2	–	1	10	–	4	–	3
Utah Tech	3	–	1	–	3	4	–	7	–	6
No. 21 Grand Canyon ‡	3	–	1	–	3	14	–	4	–	5
San Jose State	3	–	2	–	2	12	–	4	–	4
San Diego State	3	–	2	–	2	7	–	9	–	2
Utah Valley	2	–	3	–	2	8	–	4	–	3
UNLV	1	–	2	–	4	4	–	6	–	6
Air Force	0	–	6	–	1	1	–	13	–	3
† – Conference champion ‡ – 2025 WAC tournament Champion + – At-large invitation to the 2025 NCAA tournament; As of May 2, 2026; Rankings from United Soccer Coaches; Source: WAC

2025 NCAA Division I independents men's soccer records
	Conf.			Overall
Team	W	L	T	W		L		T
UT Rio Grande Valley		–		1	–	7	–	2

== Postseason ==
=== Conference winners and tournaments ===
Conference	Regular Season Champion(s)	Tournament Winner	Conference Tournament	Tournament Dates	Tournament Venue (City)
ACC	Virginia	SMU	2025 tournament	November 5–17	First Round and Quarterfinals: Campus sites, hosted by higher seed Semifinals and Final: WakeMed Soccer Park • Cary, North Carolina
America East	Vermont		2025 tournament	November 8–16	Campus sites, hosted by higher seed
American	Florida Atlantic & Charlotte (Note: Top seed in conference tournament.)	Florida Atlantic	2025 tournament	November 7–15	Quarterfinals: Campus sites, hosted by higher seed Semifinals and final: Hosted by regular-season champion
ASUN	Gold – Bellarmine	North Florida	2025 tournament	November 8–15	Campus sites, hosted by higher seed
ASUN	Graphite – North Florida	North Florida	2025 tournament	November 8–15	Campus sites, hosted by higher seed
Atlantic 10	Saint Louis		2025 tournament	November 7–16	Campus sites, hosted by higher seed
Big East	East – Georgetown	Georgetown	2025 tournament	November 13–16	Maryland SoccerPlex • Boyds, Maryland
Big East	Midwest – Akron	Georgetown	2025 tournament	November 13–16	Maryland SoccerPlex • Boyds, Maryland
Big South	High Point		2025 tournament	November 5–15	Campus sites, hosted by higher seed
Big Ten	Maryland	UCLA	2025 tournament	November 12–16	Ludwig Field • College Park, Maryland
Big West	UC Irvine, Cal Poly, & UCSB	UC Irvine	2025 tournament	November 5–14	Campus sites, hosted by higher seed
CAA	North – Hofstra	Elon	2025 tournament	November 6–15	Campus sites, hosted by higher seed
CAA	South – Elon	Elon	2025 tournament	November 6–15	Campus sites, hosted by higher seed
Horizon	Cleveland State		2025 tournament	November 9–15	Campus sites, hosted by higher seed
Ivy	Princeton		2025 tournament	November 14–16	Campus sites, hosted by No. 1 seed
MAAC	Sacred Heart	Siena	2025 tournament	November 9–16	Campus sites, hosted by higher seed
Missouri Valley	Drake, Northern Illinois & Evansville	Western Michigan	2025 tournament	November 9–15	Campus sites, hosted by higher seed
NEC	Fairleigh Dickinson		2025 tournament	November 13–16	Campus sites, hosted by higher seed
OVC	Lindenwood		2025 tournament	November 9–15	Harlen C. Hunter Stadium • St. Charles, Missouri
Patriot	American	Lafayette	2025 tournament	November 8–15	Campus sites, hosted by higher seed
SoCon	Furman		2025 tournament	November 7–16	Quarterfinals and semifinals: Campus sites, hosted by top two seeds Final: Hosted by top remaining seed
The Summit	Kansas City & Denver	Denver	2025 tournament	November 9–15	Campus sites, hosted by higher seed
Sun Belt	Kentucky	UCF	2025 tournament	November 9–16	Quarterfinals and semifinals: Campus sites, hosted by top two seeds Final: Hosted by top remaining seed
WAC	Cal Baptist	Grand Canyon	2025 tournament	November 9–15	CBU Soccer Stadium • Riverside, California
WCC	San Diego	No tournament			

== Awards and honors ==
=== TopDrawerSoccer.com Player/Team of the Week ===
- **Bold** denotes TDS Player of the Week.

TopDrawer Soccer Team of the Week
Week	Goalkeeper	Defenders	Midfielders	Forwards	Bench
Week 1 – Aug. 25	(United States) Colin Monroe (Detroit Mercy)	(Germany) Nick Lockermann (Vermont) (Spain) Iker Carbonell (Oregon State) (Canada) Nicolas Pietrantonio (South Florida)	(United States) Zachary Bohane (Stanford) (United States) Scott Neil (FIU) (United States) Keegan Oyler (Utah Valley) (Belgium) Edouard Nys (UIC)	(Japan) **Fumiya Shiraishi** (Missouri State) (France) Enzo Dovlo (UNCG) (Saint Lucia) Donavan Phillip (NC State)	(United States) Eric Widrick (Colgate) (Rwanda) Noe Uwimana (Virginia Tech) (Northern Ireland) Aidan Kelly (UMass) (Denmark) Mikkel Madsen (Dayton) (Italy) Gabriele Galluccio (Kansas City) (United States) Gavin Csiszar (Lindenwood) (United States) Diego Hernandez (Furman) (Netherlands) Loed Klaasen (Coastal Carolina) (Spain) Pablo Pozos (West Virginia) (United States) Daniel Lugo (High Point) (United States) Jaylen Orr (Gardner–Webb) (Serbia) Luka Lukić (California) (United States) Bryce Flowers (Northeastern)
Week 2 – Sep. 2					
Week 3 – Sep. 9					
Week 4 – Sep. 16					
Week 5 – Sep. 23					
Week 6 – Sep. 30					
Week 7 – Oct. 7					
Week 8 – Oct. 14					
Week 9 – Oct. 21					
Week 10 – Oct. 28	(United States) Jackson Ozburn (Santa Clara)	(England) Riley Moloney (NC State) (Germany) Frederik Sadjak (Princeton) (United States) Joaquin Torres (Cal Poly)	(Finland) Kevin Larsson (Kentucky) (Netherlands) Loed Klaasen (Coastal Carolina) (United States) Angel Iniguez (San Jose State) (United States) Nick Washington (Central Connecticut)	(Jamaica) **Nicholas Simmonds** (Virginia) (Norway) Daniel Burko (Hofstra) (Germany) Philipp Kühn (Vermont)	(Brazil) Matheus Rhormens (Queens (NC)) (United States) Owen Travis (FIU) (Germany) Leandro Haesler (Lindenwood) (United States) Ignatius DeMark (FGCU) (United States) Ulises Grado (Cal State Fullerton) (United States) Zach Ramsey (Washington) (Egypt) Omar Ramadan (Creighton) (Germany) Niklas Kneller (Niagara) (France) Lilian Ricol (UCF) (Spain) Sergi Solans (UCLA) (United States) Declan Quill (Virginia Tech)
Week 11 – Nov. 4	(United States) **Carlito Saylon** (Tulsa)	(United States) D'Andre Pickett (California) (United States) Nick Dang (Virginia) (United States) Bryant Mayer (Northwestern)	(Denmark) Emil Seedorff (Georgia Southern) (Spain) Jesús Macaya (Longwood) (United States) Andres Mata (Stetson) (Australia) William Kennedy (Lipscomb)	(Canada) Marcus Caldeira (West Virginia) (United States) Brock Kiper (Belmont) (Zimbabwe) Brandon Nyagurungo (South Florida)	(Poland) Michal Mroz (Evansville) (Venezuela) Stefano D'Agostini (Brown) (Canada) Nana Obeng (Houston Christian) (United States) Will Baker (Michigan) (Spain) Arnau Guillamon (Fairleigh Dickinson) (Greece) Konstantinos Georgallides (UCLA) (France) Clarence Awoudor (UCF) (United States) Kenan Hot (Duke) (Serbia) Stefan Dobrijević (Akron) (United States) Marcus Lee (UC Irvine) (Central African Republic) Arnaud Tattevin (UNCG)
Week 12 – Nov. 11					
Week 13 – Nov. 18					
Week 14 – Nov. 25					
Week 15 – Dec. 2					
Week 16 – Dec. 9					

=== Major player of the year awards ===
- Hermann Trophy: Donavan Phillip – NC State
- TopDrawerSoccer.com National Player of the Year Award: Junior Diouf – Grand Canyon

=== Other major awards ===
- United Soccer Coaches College Coach of the Year: Doug Allison – Furman
- NCAA Tournament MVP: Zach Ramsey (Offense) Jadon Bowton (Defense)

=== Conference players and coaches of the year ===
Conference	Conference Player of the Year	Offensive Player of the Year (Note: Honorees are forwards unless otherwise indicated.)	Defensive Player of the Year (Note: Honorees are defenders unless otherwise indicated.)	Midfielder of the Year	Goalkeeper of the Year	Rookie of the Year	Coach of the Year
ACC	—N/a	Donavan Phillip , NC State	Nikola Markovic, NC State	Ransford Gyan, Clemson	Logan Erb, NC State	Nicholas Simmonds, F/M, Virginia (Note: This conference's award is "Freshman of the Year" and restricted to players of that classification.)	George Gelnovatch, Virginia
America East	—N/a	Jaime Amaro, Bryant (Note: This conference's award is styled as "Striker of the Year".)	Nick Lockermann, Vermont (Note: This conference's award is styled as "Defender of the Year".)	Paco Fernandez, Bryant	Niklas Herceg, Vermont	Nico Loebus, MF, Vermont	Vermont (head coach: Rob Dow) (Note: The top coaching award in this conference is styled as "Coaching Staff of the Year" and presented to an entire staff, although the head coach is personally cited in the award announcement. The American Conference and Missouri Valley Conference cite each member of the winning staff individually.)
American	—N/a	Mamadou Diarra, Florida Atlantic	Luke Adams, Tulsa	Ben Fisher, Charlotte	Leo Stritter, Charlotte & Jahiem Wickham, South Florida	Samuel Manufor, DF, Charlotte	Florida Atlantic (head coach: Joey Worthen)
ASUN	Johan Nissen-Lie, F, Bellarmine & Anton Khelil, MF, North Florida	—N/a	Jaylen Yearwood, North Florida	Anton Khelil, North Florida	Luciano Natoli, North Florida	Logan Hall, DF, Jacksonville	Tim Chastonay, Bellarmine
Atlantic 10	—N/a	Daniel D’Ippolito, Fordham	Moussa Ndiaye, VCU	Daniel D'Ippolito, Fordham	Jeremi Abonnel, Saint Louis	Daniel Lang, DF, Fordham	Kevin Kalish, Saint Louis
Big East	—N/a	Stefan Dobrijevic, Akron	Agustin Resch, Seton Hall	Zach Zengue, Georgetown	Mitchell Budler, Akron	Guilherme Gomes, MF, St. John's	Georgetown (head coach: Brian Wiese)
Big Ten	—N/a	Palmer Ault, Indiana	Lasse Kelp, Maryland	Richie Aman, Washington	Laurin Mack, Maryland	Peter Soudan, MF, Michigan State	Sasho Cirovski, Maryland
Big South	—N/a	Daniel Lugo, High Point	Lukas Kamrath, High Point	Jefferson Amaya, High Point	Josh Caron, High Point	Freshman: Prosper Adagani, F, High Point; Newcomer: Daniel Lugo, F, High Point (Note: This conference presents separate awards for Freshman of the Year and Newcomer of the Year. The latter is open to any player in his first season of conference competition, regardless of academic classification.)	High Point (head coach: Zach Haines)
Big West	—N/a	Mario Carlos, Cal State Fullerton	Calle Mollerberg, UC Santa Barbara	Jose de la Torre, Cal State Fullerton	Nicky McCune, Cal Poly	Steinar Bjornsson, F, UC Santa Barbara	Yossi Raz, UC Irvine
CAA	Laurie Goddard, MF, Hofstra	—N/a	Laurie Goddard, Hofstra	Jamie Orson, Stony Brook & Jake Shannon, UNCW	—N/a	Dominik Renz, F, Elon	Richard Nuttall, Hofstra
Horizon	Keegan Walker, F, Green Bay	Shane Anderson, Purdue Fort Wayne	Uros Jevtic, Cleveland State	—N/a	Ryan Poling, Cleveland State	Uzman Ramees, MF, Cleveland State	Siniša Ubiparipović, Cleveland State
Ivy	—N/a	Daniel Ittycheria, Princeton	Andrew Samuels, Princeton	—N/a	—N/a	Adam Poliakov, F, Harvard	Princeton (head coach: Jim Barlow)
MAAC	—N/a	Tim Strele, Saint Peter's (Note: The MAAC's award in this category is styled as "Golden Boot".)	Daniel Losfablos, Sacred Heart	—N/a	Luca Marinelli, Sacred Heart (Note: The MAAC's award in this category is styled as "Golden Glove".)	Martin Piedeleu, MF, Siena	Anthony Anzevui, Sacred Heart
Missouri Valley	Edouard Nys, F, UIC	Edouard Nys, UIC (Note: This conference's award is styled as "Forward of the Year".)	Martin Wurschmidt, Evansville	Eskil Gjerde, Drake	Michal Mroz, Evansville	Andres Escudero, F, Evansville	Evansville (head coach: Robbe Tarver)
Northeast	Arnau Rabassa Guillamon, F, FDU	—N/a	Niklas Thanhofer, LIU	—N/a	Diego Garciarena, Saint Francis	Naim Robinson, MF, Howard	Jaymee Highcock, FDU
OVC	—N/a	Luca Bartoni, Lindenwood	Leandro Haesler, Lindenwood	D'Alessandro Herrera, Houston Christian	Alex Aitken, Houston Christian	Joby Reid, F, Houston Christian	Kris Bertsch, Lindenwood
Patriot	—N/a	Drew Roskos, Bucknell	Jackson Sullivan, Bucknell	Troy Elgersma, American	Matthew Tibbetts, American	Archie Hatcher, F, Holy Cross	Evansville (head coach: Zach Samol)
SoCon	Diego Hernandez, MF, Furman	—N/a	—N/a	—N/a	Ivan Horvat, Furman	Braden Dunham, DF, Furman	Doug Allison, Furman
Summit	—N/a	Kyle McGowan, Denver	Trevor Wright, Denver	Rich Monath, Denver	Isaac Nehme, Denver	Bryce Outman, MF/F, Kansas City	Ryan Pore, Kansas City
Sun Belt	Marcus Caldeira, F, West Virginia	Marcus Caldeira, West Virginia	Noah Holmstrom, Georgia Southern	—N/a	Sebastian Conlon, Kentucky	Freshman: Emil Seedorff, MF, Georgia Southern; Newcomer: Lilian Ricol, F, UCF	Johan Cedergren, Kentucky
WAC	—N/a	Junior Diouf, Grand Canyon	Stavros Charalampous, Cal Baptist	—N/a	Luca Campoli, Utah Tech	Junior Diouf, F, Grand Canyon	Jonny Broadhead, Utah Tech
WCC	—N/a	Arnau Farnos, Oregon State	Ethan Warne, San Diego	Diego Rosas, Portland	Lucca Adams, San Diego	Ben Norris, MF, San Francison	Brian Quinn, San Diego

== See also ==
- College soccer
- List of NCAA Division I men's soccer programs
- 2025 in American soccer
- 2025 NCAA Division I men's soccer tournament
- 2025 NCAA Division I women's soccer season
