= 2025 NCAA Division I men's soccer tournament =

2025 edition of the NCAA Division I men's soccer tournament

- Classification: Division I
- Teams: 48
- Matches: 47
- Site: WakeMed Soccer Park (semifinal and final); Cary, North Carolina
- Champions: Washington (1st title)
- Winning coach: Jamie Clark (1st title)
- MVP: Zach Ramsey (offensive); Jadon Bowton (defensive) (Washington)
- Broadcast: ESPN2, ESPNU, ESPN+, ACCN

The 2025 NCAA Division I men's soccer tournament was the 67th edition of the NCAA Division I men's soccer tournament, a postseason tournament to determine the national champion of the 2025 NCAA Division I men's soccer season. The College Cup was played on December 12 and December 15 at WakeMed Soccer Park in Cary, North Carolina.

Vermont entered the season and tournament as the defending national champion.

== Background and format ==
The NCAA has been awarding a national men's soccer championship to men's varsity soccer programs since 1959. Since its inaugural tournament, the NCAA Division I men's soccer tournament has been held annually at the conclusion of the NCAA Division I men's soccer regular season, from mid-November to mid-December, with the exception of the 2020 tournament, which was played in May 2021 due to the COVID-19 pandemic. At the time of the inaugural tournament, eight teams participated in the national tournament and has expanded in size since then. Since 2001, the tournament has featured 48 teams, with the exception of the 2020 tournament, which was reduced to 32 teams due to COVID-19.

On December 9, 2024, the NCAA confirmed that WakeMed Soccer Park in Cary, North Carolina (near the Raleigh-Durham region) would host the College Cup (semifinals and final).

== Qualification ==
All Division I men's soccer programs are eligible to qualify for the tournament. 21 teams received automatic bids by winning their conference tournaments, one team received an automatic bid by claiming the conference regular season crown (the West Coast Conference does not hold a conference tournament), and an additional 26 teams earned at-large bids based on their regular season records.

Automatic bids
Conference	Team	Date qualified	Record	Appearance	Last bid
American	Florida Atlantic	November 15	12–3–2	1st	None
America East	Vermont	November 16	14-0-5	15th	2024
ACC	SMU	November 16	11-4-4	37th	2024
Atlantic 10	Saint Louis	November 16	10-2-7	52nd	2024
ASUN	North Florida	November 15	12–5–1	3rd	2024
Big East	Georgetown	November 16	11-3-4	16th	2024
Big South	High Point	November 15	13–1–4	5th	2023
Big Ten	UCLA	November 16	8-6-4	50th	2024
Big West	UC Irvine	November 14	11–3–6	8th	2023
CAA	Elon	November 16	9-3-6	6th	2022
Horizon	Cleveland State	November 15	9–3–6	11th	2022
Ivy	Princeton	November 16	15-1-2	13th	2024
MAAC	Siena	November 16	9-5-4	1st	None
Missouri Valley	Western Michigan	November 15	7–9–4	6th	2024
NEC	Fairleigh Dickinson	November 16	13-4-3	19th	2022
Ohio Valley	Lindenwood	November 15	14–2–4	1st	None
Patriot	Lafayette	November 15	8–6–7	6th	2012
SoCon	Furman	November 16	14-1-4	13th	2024
Summit League	Denver	November 15	11–7–2	14th	2024
Sun Belt (Note: Kentucky, UCF, and West Virginia are all men's soccer affiliates of the Sun Belt Conference. Neither the Southeastern Conference (primary home of Kentucky) nor the Big 12 Conference (primary home of UCF and West Virginia) sponsors men's soccer.)	UCF	November 16	10-6-3	10th	2023
WAC	Grand Canyon	November 15	13–3–4	4th	2021
West Coast	San Diego	November 15	13–2–3	18th	2024

At-large bids
Conference	Team	Record	Appearance	Last bid
America East	Bryant	16–2–2	2nd	2023
ACC	Clemson	8–5–3	38th	2024
ACC	Duke	8–3–6	32nd	2024
ACC	NC State	12–2–4	18th	2024
ACC	North Carolina	9–5–4	32nd	2024
ACC	Notre Dame	8–6–4	25th	2023
ACC	Stanford	13–3-2	23rd	2024
ACC	Syracuse	9–7–3	10th	2023
ACC	Virginia	12–2–4	45th	2024
Big East (Note: Akron is a men's soccer affiliate member of the Big East Conference, as its primary conference; the Mid-American Conference does not sponsor men's soccer.)	Akron	11–4–3	33rd	2024
Big East	Seton Hall	7–3–7	14th	2022
Big East	St. John's	9–5–4	23rd	2021
Big East	UConn	11–4–4	37th	2018
Big Ten	Indiana	12–5–1	50th	2024
Big Ten	Maryland	12–1–3	42nd	2024
Big Ten	Michigan	12–3–4	10th	2024
Big Ten	Washington	10–6–2	30th	2024
CAA	Hofstra	12–5–0	10th	2024
Ivy League	Cornell	13–3–2	13th	2024
SoCon	UNC Greensboro	12–4–4	13th	2022
Summit League	Kansas City	11–3–5	5th	2024
Sun Belt	Kentucky	10–3–5	15th	2023
Sun Belt	Marshall	11–3–5	7th	2024
Sun Belt	West Virginia	12–4–3	18th	2024
WCC (Note: Oregon State is a men's soccer affiliate member of the West Coast Conference, as its primary home of the Pac-12 Conference does not sponsor men's soccer.)	Oregon State	10–4–2	10th	2024
WCC	Portland	13–1–3	20th	2023

=== Seeded teams ===
The top 16 teams are seeded and earn a bye to the second round of the tournament.

Seeded teams
Seed	School	Conference	Record	Berth type	United Soccer Coaches ranking
1	Vermont	America East	14–0–5	Automatic	2
2	Virginia	ACC	12–2–4	At-large	4
3	Princeton	Ivy	15–1–2	Automatic	3
4	Maryland	Big Ten	12–1–3	At-large	1
5	SMU	ACC	11–4–4	Automatic	25
6	Indiana	Big Ten	12–5–1	At-large	24
7	Georgetown	Big East	10–3–4	Automatic	15
8	Portland	West Coast	11–1–3	At-large	6
9	San Diego	West Coast	13–2–3	Automatic	7
10	High Point	Big South	13–1–4	Automatic	9
11	Bryant	America East	15–1–2	At-large	5
12	Stanford	ACC	13–3–2	At-large	8
13	UConn	Big East	13–3–2	At-large	RV
14	Akron	Big East	11–3–3	At-large	14
15	NC State	ACC	12–2–4	At-large	11
16	Furman	SoCon	12–1–4	Automatic	12

== Bracket ==
The bracket was announced on Monday, November 17, 2025. First round games were to be played on November 20 at campus sites.

=== Vermont Region 1 ===
First round November 20
Syracuse*	0
Hofstra	2
Clemson*	0
Western Michigan	1
UCLA*	0 (1)
Grand Canyon (p)	0 (3)
Denver*	2
UC Irvine	0

Second round November 23
1	Vermont*	2
Hofstra (a.e.t.)	3
Western Michigan	0
16	Furman*	1
9	San Diego*	1
Grand Canyon	2
Denver	2 (4)
8	Portland* (p)	2 (5)

Third round November 29–30
Hofstra	3 (4)
16	Furman* (p)	3 (5)
Grand Canyon	0
8	Portland*	1

Quarterfinals; December 5–6
16	Furman	1
8	Portland*	0

*Host institution

==== Schedule ====
===== First round =====
November 20	Denver	2–0	UC Irvine	Denver, CO
3:00 p.m. MST	Kyle McGowan 71'; Luke Schultz 75'	Report		Stadium: CIBER Field; Attendance: 514; Referee: Mindi Lamboni; Assistant referees: Jarred Mosher; Joseph Saskowski; Fourth official: Michael Donovan

November 20	Syracuse	0–2	Hofstra	Syracuse, NY
6:00 p.m. EST	Tim Brdaric (yellow card) 33'; Chimere Omeze (yellow card) 59'	Report	Laurie Goddard 19' (pen.); Daniel Burko 26'; Evangelos Chrysostomou (yellow card) 45'	Stadium: SU Soccer Stadium; Attendance: 670; Referee: Adam Kilpatrick; Assistant referees: Scott Kachmarik; Garrett Owen; Fourth official: Stephen Montanino

November 20	Clemson	0–1	Western Michigan	Clemson, SC
6:00 p.m. EST	Arthur Duquenne (yellow card) 90'	Report	Mathieu Beuvain 21'; Juan Romero (yellow card) 54'	Stadium: Riggs Field; Attendance: 861; Referee: Richonne Clark; Assistant referees: Danny Thornberry; Tyler Bost; Fourth official: Khadime Sabara

November 20	UCLA	0–0 (a.e.t.) (1–3 p)	Grand Canyon	Los Angeles, CA
2:00 p.m. PST	Oliver Roche (yellow card) 73'; Konstantinos Georgallides (yellow card) 85'	Report		Stadium: Wallis Annenberg Stadium; Attendance: 323; Referee: Rene Núñez; Assistant referees: Kristen Patterson; Austin Cozzi; Fourth official: Matthew Tanious
	Penalties
	Konstantinos Georgallides (penalty scored); Sebastian Rincon (penalty missed); Artem Vovk (penalty missed); Adrian Aguilar (penalty missed)		(penalty missed) Liam Harrington; (penalty scored) Alan Hermitte; (penalty scored) Junior Diouf; (penalty scored) Charles Volcy

===== Second round =====
November 23	(1) Vermont	2–3 (a.e.t.)	Hofstra	Burlington, VT
1:00 p.m. EST	Philipp Kühn 13'; Niels Hartman (yellow card) 61'; Rui Aoki 84'	Report	Aleksei Armas (yellow card) 38'; Pablo Hempelmann-Perez 66'; Jan Ziewiec 68'; Laurie Goddard 97'	Stadium: Virtue Field; Attendance: 2,630; Referee: Matthew Mercier; Assistant referees: George Frascione; Kyle O'Grady; Fourth official: Jeremiah Vallieres

November 23	(16) Furman	1–0	Western Michigan	Greenville, SC
2:00 p.m. EST	Trip Campbell 43'	Report	Jordan Klein (yellow card) 22'	Stadium: Stone Stadium; Attendance: 2,205; Referee: Amin Hadzić; Assistant referees: Justin Howard; Chris Zuerner; Fourth official: Kevin Broadley

November 23	(9) San Diego	1–2	Grand Canyon	San Diego, CA
5:00 p.m. PST	Iain Wagner 66'; Owen Walz (yellow card) 75'	Report	Ben Assane Fall 6'; Junior Diouf 88'	Stadium: Torero Stadium; Attendance: 1,511; Referee: Brandon Stevis; Assistant referees: Emmanuel Padilla; Edwar Hernandez; Fourth official: Victor Ruiz

November 23	(8) Portland	2–2 (a.e.t.) (5–4 p)	Denver	Portland, OR
6:00 p.m. PST	Joe Highfield 20' (pen.); Angel Martinez (yellow card) 48'; Anton Hjalmarsson (yellow card) 55'; Wylie Trujillo (yellow card) 64'; Diego Rosas 65'	Report	Holger Olsson 3' (pen.); Trevor Wright (yellow card) 62'; Kyle McGowan 77'; Aidan Semelsberger (yellow card) 97'	Stadium: Merlo Field; Attendance: 2,329; Referee: Cedric Adams; Assistant referees: Raymond Moffatte Jr. C. J. Koll; Fourth official: Chris Wilgus
	Penalties
	Joe Highfield (penalty scored); Anton Hjalmarsson (penalty scored); Andrew Portis (penalty scored); Micaah Garnette (penalty scored); David Ajagbe (penalty scored)		(penalty scored) Jake Smith; (penalty missed) Dylan Akau; (penalty scored) Ian Welch; (penalty scored) Holger Olsson; (penalty scored) Kyle McGowan

===== Third round =====
November 29	(8) Portland	1–0	Grand Canyon	Portland, OR
7:00 p.m. PST	Joe Highfield 80'; Angel Martinez (yellow card) 82'	Report	Junior Diouf (yellow card) 90'	Stadium: Merlo Field; Attendance: 3,024; Referee: Will Niccolls; Assistant referees: J. J. Blodgett; Cody Zipp; Fourth official: Pawel Sojka

November 30	(16) Furman	3–3 (a.e.t.) (5–4 p)	Hofstra	Greenville, SC
1:00 p.m. EST	Luke Hutzell 45' (yellow card) 73'; Wilfer Bustamante 77'; Diego Hernandez 80'	Report	Daniel Burko 17'; Hofstra Team (yellow card) 75'; Laurie Goddard 81', 82'	Stadium: Stone Stadium; Attendance: 1,676; Referee: Daniel Radford; Assistant referees: Robert Dail; Raymond Thomas; Fourth official: Kyle Johnston
	Penalties
	Braden Dunham (penalty scored); Diego Hernandez (penalty scored); Connor Stout (penalty scored); Wilfer Bustamante (penalty scored); Landon Hill (penalty scored)		(penalty scored) Aleksei Armas; (penalty scored) Pablo Hempelmann-Perez; (penalty missed) Stefano Campisi; (penalty scored) Daniel Burko; (penalty scored) Laurie Goddard

===== Quarterfinals =====
December 5	(8) Portland	0–1	(16) Furman	Portland, OR
7:00 p.m. PST	Wylie Trujillo (yellow card) 19'; Sebastian Hernandez (yellow card) 66'	Report	Wilfer Bustamante (yellow card) 34'; Lloyd Wamu Snell (yellow card) 53'; Ryan Wagner (yellow card) 72'; Gianluca Rizzo (yellow card) 74'; Braden Dunham 75'	Stadium: Merlo Field; Attendance: 4,252; Referee: Michael Gebreslassie; Assistant referees: Baboucarr Jallow; Cameron Zipp; Fourth official: Raymond Moffatte Jr.

=== Virginia Region 2 ===
First round November 20
UCF*	3
Florida Atlantic	2
West Virginia* (a.e.t.)	4
St. John's	3
Marshall*	1
Cleveland State	0
UNC Greensboro* (p)	0 (4)
Elon	0 (3)

Second round November 23
7	Georgetown*	2
UCF	0
West Virginia	2
10	High Point*	3
15	NC State*	2
Marshall	0
UNC Greensboro (p)	2 (4)
2	Virginia*	2 (3)

Third round November 29–30
7	Georgetown*	2
10	High Point	1
15	NC State*	2
UNC Greensboro	0

Quarterfinals; December 5–6
7	Georgetown*	2
15	NC State	3

*Host institution

==== Schedule ====
===== First round =====
November 20	UNC Greensboro	0–0 (a.e.t.) (4–3 p)	Elon	Greensboro, NC
5:00 p.m. EST	Daniel Longo (yellow card) 79'	Report	Charlie Kitch (yellow card) 51'; Jahmir Flowers (yellow card) 85'; Weston Jonke (yellow card) 103'	Stadium: UNCG Soccer Stadium; Attendance: 1,524; Referee: Sergio Gonzalez; Assistant referees: Rick Rogers; Chris Zuerner; Fourth official: Eric Usher
	Penalties
	Arnaud Tattevin (penalty scored); Magnus Kjoller (penalty scored); Enzo Dovlo (penalty scored); Daniel Longo (penalty missed); Kimito Fritz (penalty scored)		(penalty missed) Jack Donlon; (penalty scored) Jordin Wilson; (penalty scored) August Guinle; (penalty missed) Einar Ness; (penalty scored) Martin Kozak

November 20	UCF	3–2	Florida Atlantic	Orlando, FL
7:00 p.m. EST	Clarence Awoudor 15'; Gwendal Degorce (yellow card) 21'; Joey Mueller 24'; Lilian Ricol 59'	Report	Caleb Chapman (yellow card) 53'; Andreas Raisanen 56'; Mamadou Diarra 81'; Felipe Santos (yellow card) 87'	Stadium: UCF Soccer and Track Stadium; Attendance: 1,358; Referee: Elvis Osmanovic; Assistant referees: Carlos Morales-Lastra<>Jake Joyce; Fourth official: Arnel Selman

November 20	West Virginia	4–3 (a.e.t.)	St. John's	Morgantown, WV
7:00 p.m. EST	Marcus Caldeira 69' 87' 90+4'; Nicolas Scargle 79'	Report	Andrew Porucznik (yellow card) 36'; Kaief Tomlinson (yellow card) 42'; Team (yellow card) 44'; Bjorn Nikolajewski 46' (pen.); Gabe Smyth 51'; Guilherme Gomes 81'	Stadium: Dick Dlesk Soccer Stadium; Attendance: 905; Referee: Austin Saini; Assistant referees: Benjamin Mast; Dustin Killick; Fourth official: Adam Walters

November 20	Marshall	1–0	Cleveland State	Huntington, WV
7:15 p.m. EST	Joao Alves (yellow card) 4'; Nikita Pakhomov (yellow card) 6'; David de la Vibora Bonilla 28'	Report	Uros Jevtic (yellow card) 44'; CSU Team (yellow card) 80' (red card) 81'	Stadium: Veterans Memorial Soccer Complex; Attendance: 1,975

===== Second round =====
November 23	(2) Virginia	2–2 (a.e.t.) (3–4 p)	UNC Greensboro	Charlottesville, VA
5:00 p.m. EST	AJ Smith 16'; Zachary Ehrenpreis (yellow card) 33'; Jesus de Vicente (yellow card) 44'; Simmonds 80' (pen.)	Report	Issah Haruna 5'; Pablo Torre 40'; Sami Lachekar (yellow card) 74'	Stadium: Klöckner Stadium; Attendance: 1,255; Referee: Sorin Stoica; Assistant referees: Richard Wells; Nicholas Seymour; Fourth official: Jeffrey Skinker
	Penalties
	Simmonds (penalty missed); AJ Smith (penalty scored); Luke Burns (penalty scored); Jesus de Vicente (penalty scored); Marcos dos Santos (penalty missed)		(penalty scored) Arnaud Tattevin; (penalty scored) Magnus Kjoller; (penalty scored) Enzo Dovlo; (penalty missed) Daniel Longo; (penalty scored) Kimito Fritz

November 23	(7) Georgetown	2–0	UCF	Washington, DC
5:00 p.m. EST	Mitchell Baker 69' 80'	Report		Stadium: Shaw Field; Attendance: 1,107; Referee: Stephen Foster; Assistant referees: Eric Weisbrod; A. Max Smith; Fourth official: Gregory Demello

November 23	(15) NC State	2–0	Marshall	Raleigh, NC
6:00 p.m. EST	Donavan Phillip 2'; Calem Tommy (yellow card) 27'; Riley Moloney 59'	Report	David de la Vibora Bonilla (yellow card) 64'; Marshall Team (yellow card) 73'	Stadium: Dail Soccer Field; Attendance: 1,678; Referee: Kevin Maurer; Assistant referees: Benjamin Wooten; Eric Usher; Fourth official: Richard Crowgey

November 23	(10) High Point	3–2	West Virginia	High Point, NC
7:30 p.m. EST	Noah Behrmann 32'; Mo Guettel 37'; Chris Niblock 53'	Report	Nicolas Scargle (yellow card) 27'; WVU Team (yellow card) 55'; Isaac Scheer 55'; Bryce Swinehart (yellow card) 65'; Marcus Caldeira 87'	Stadium: Vert Stadium; Attendance: 4,913; Referee: David Erbacher; Assistant referees: Rick Rogers; Hillis Waddell; Fourth official: Josiah Parke

===== Third round =====
November 29	(7) Georgetown	2–1	(10) High Point	Washington, DC
5:00 p.m. EST	Mitchell Baker 16'; GU Team (yellow card) 54'; Zach Zengue 61'; Max Viera (yellow card) 81'	Report	Lukas Kamrath (yellow card) 53'; Prosper Adagani (yellow card) 79'; Jefferson Amaya (yellow card) 84' (goal) 89'	Stadium: Shaw Field; Attendance: 1,311; Referee: Austin Saini; Assistant referees: Josh Pitt; Nate Penn; Fourth official: Gary Gutierrez

November 30	(15) NC State	2–0	UNC Greensboro	Raleigh, NC
6:00 p.m. EST	Taig Healy 6'; Donavan Phillip 79'	Report		Stadium: Dail Soccer Field; Attendance: 1,211; Referee: Dimitar Chavdarov; Assistant referees: Benjamin Mast; Marcus Moss; Fourth official: Hicham El Bariqi

===== Quarterfinals =====
December 6	(7) Georgetown	2-3	(15) NC State	Washington, DC
3:00 p.m. EST	Loukas Maroutsis 35'; Tate Lampman 37'; Mitchell Baker (yellow card) 56'; Eric Howard (yellow card) 90'	Report	Isaac Heffess (yellow card) 4'; Taig Healy 6'; Drew Lovelace 8'; Nikola Markovic (yellow card) 14'; Carlos Santamaria 36' (pen.); Riley Moloney (yellow card) 62'; Tyler Caton (yellow card) 68'; NC State Team (yellow card) 90'	Stadium: Shaw Field; Attendance: 2107; Referee: JC Griggs; Assistant referees: Ross Kleinstruber; Trevor Hadick; Fourth official: Nathaniel Hirschman

=== Princeton Region 3 ===
First round November 20
Duke*	1
Fairleigh Dickinson	0
Michigan*	0
Notre Dame	1
Seton Hall* (p)	1 (3)
Siena	1 (0)
Saint Louis (a.e.t.) *	2
Kentucky	1

Second round November 23
3	Princeton*	1
Duke	2
Notre Dame	0
14	Akron*	1
11	Bryant*	1
Seton Hall	0
Saint Louis	1
6	Indiana*	0

Third round November 29–30
Duke	0
14	Akron*	2
11	Bryant*	2 (3)
Saint Louis	2 (4)

Quarterfinals; December 5–6
14	Akron*	2
Saint Louis	3

*Host institution

==== Schedule ====
===== First round =====
November 20	Duke	1–0	Fairleigh Dickinson	Durham, NC
1:00 p.m. EST	Ulfur Björnsson (yellow card) 67' (goal) 89' (pen.); Preston Zabinko (yellow card) 74'	Report	Nk Tima (yellow card) 47'; Connor O Reilly (yellow card) 70'; Matheus Franca (yellow card) 89'	Stadium: Koskinen Stadium; Attendance: 236; Referee: John Matto; Assistant referees: Robert Dail; Justin Howard; Fourth official: Kevin Broadley

November 20	Seton Hall	1–1 (a.e.t.) (3–0 p)	Siena	South Orange, NJ
5:00 p.m. EST	Agustin Resch 59' (yellow card) 90'; Pyry Lampinen (yellow card) 87'; Giacomo Mana (yellow card) 88'; Ralph Pascarella (yellow card) 88'; Thomas Sellwood (yellow card) 105'	Report	Mario Navarro Perez 89'; Christian Amaral (yellow card) 88'; Thomas Sams (yellow card) 89'	Stadium: Owen T. Carroll Field; Attendance: 489; Referee: Andrea Pileri; Assistant referees: Zachary Rubinich; Michael Gorsegner; Fourth official: Corey Phillips
	Penalties
	Mans Saebbo (penalty scored); Konstantin Donalies (penalty scored); Axel Berglund (penalty scored)		(penalty missed) Tomislav Vrdoljak; (penalty missed) Martin Piedeleu; (penalty missed) Eric Svensson

November 20	Michigan	0–1	Notre Dame	Ann Arbor, MI
6:00 p.m. EST	Matthew Fisher (yellow card) 26'; Nolan Miller (yellow card) 42'; Mitar Mitrović (yellow card) 54' (yellow-red card) 90'; João Paulo Ramos (yellow card) 54'; Nicholas Cassiday (yellow card) 72'; Team (yellow card) 72' (red card) 90+1'; Zach Martens (red card) 90+1'	Report	Wyatt Lewis (yellow card) 48'; Matthew Fisher 51' (o.g.); KK Baffour (yellow card) 57'	Stadium: U-M Soccer Stadium; Attendance: 1,133; Referee: Sorin Stoica; Assistant referees: Jeffrey Mellen; Aaron Fong; Fourth official: Donovan Noocha

November 20	Saint Louis	2–1 (a.e.t.)	Kentucky	St. Louis, MO
7:00 p.m. CST	Jack DiMaria 86' 90+14'	Report	Agustin Lopez 5'; Team (yellow card) 43'; Kevin Larsson (yellow card) 71' (yellow-red card) 83'; Marqes Muir (yellow card) 74'	Stadium: Hermann Stadium; Attendance: 1,325; Referee: Youssef El-Messoussi; Assistant referees: Kyle Armstrong; Joseph Macht; Fourth official: Velimir Stefanović

===== Second round =====
November 23	(6) Indiana	0–1	Saint Louis	Bloomington, IN
12:00 p.m. EST		Report	Quinten Blair (yellow card) 6'; Tanner Anderson 17'; SLU Team (yellow card) 81'; Gershon Henry (yellow card) 86'	Stadium: Bill Armstrong Stadium; Attendance: 2,255; Referee: Calin Radosav; Assistant referees: Jeremiah Jemison; Alex Adkins; Fourth official: Britton Maier

November 23	(14) Akron	1–0	Notre Dame	Akron, OH
1:00 p.m. EST	Matthew Paiva 88'	Report		Stadium: FirstEnergy Stadium–Cub Cadet Field; Attendance: 2,046; Referee: Eric Tattersall; Assistant referees: James Duling; Donald Williams; Fourth official: Noah Matos

November 23	(3) Princeton	1–2	Duke	Princeton, NJ
4:00 p.m. EST	Jack Hunt 33'; Daniel Ittycheria (yellow card) 43' (red card) 71'; Kevin Kelley (yellow card) 87'	Report	Kamran Acito (yellow card) 54'; Nikolai Bull Jorgensen (yellow card) 66'; Kenan Hot 71'; Leonardo D'Ambrosio 86'	Stadium: Roberts Stadium (New Jersey); Attendance: 2,303; Referee: Nickrod Fateh; Assistant referees: Ben Pilgrim; Zachary Smith; Fourth official: Marc Gottfried

November 23	(11) Bryant	1–0	Seton Hall	Smithfield, RI
6:00 p.m. EST	Muslim Umar 57'; Mamadi Jiana (yellow card) 66'; Tiago Dias (yellow card) 80'	Report		Stadium: Beirne Stadium; Attendance: 1,154; Referee: Carlos Fernandes; Assistant referees: Mike Godi; Ian Reid; Fourth official: Colby Johnson

===== Third round =====
November 30	(14) Akron	2–0	Duke	Akron, OH
4:00 p.m. EST	Remi Agunbiade 11', 52'	Report	Jamie Kabussu (yellow card) 10'; Trevor Burns (yellow card) 67'	Stadium: FirstEnergy Stadium–Cub Cadet Field; Attendance: 1,344; Referee: Lucas Feathers; Assistant referees: Michael Nickerson; William Gaither III; Fourth official: Youssef Elmessoussi

November 30	(11) Bryant	2–2 (a.e.t.) (3-4 p)	Saint Louis	Smithfield, RI
6:00 p.m. EST	Fermin Rodriguez 22'; Muslim Umar 43'; Enzo Carvalho (yellow card) 56'; Mamadi Jiana (yellow card) 56'; Fernando Delgado (yellow card) 63'	Report	Quinten Blair 18', 56' (pen.)	Stadium: Beirne Stadium; Attendance: 1,400; Referee: Stephen Foster; Assistant referees: Jennifer Dumaine; Andre Carr; Fourth official: Joseph Poremba
	Penalties
	(penalty scored) Jaime Amaro; (penalty scored) Fernando Delgado; (penalty missed) Caoimhin Mcconnell; (penalty scored) Tiago Dias; (penalty missed) Fermin Rodriguez		(penalty scored) Quinten Blair; (penalty scored) Jack DiMaria; (penalty scored) JC Cortez; (penalty scored) Tanner Anderson

===== Quarterfinals =====
December 6	(14) Akron	2–3	Saint Louis	Akron, OH
1:00 p.m. EST	Jack Roman 4'; Daragh Reilly (yellow card) 27'; Ignacio Alem (yellow card) 35'; Matt Dreas 38' (red card) 63'	Report	Andrew Heckenlaible (yellow card) 36'; Jackson Delkus (yellow card) 38'; SLU Team 50' (o.g.); Quinten Blair 78' (pen.); Tanner Anderson 87'	Stadium: FirstEnergy Stadium–Cub Cadet Field; Attendance: 1,918; Referee: Dimitar Chavdarov; Assistant referees: Fernando Pina; Marcus Barnett; Fourth official: Sorin Stoica

=== Maryland Region 4 ===
First round November 20
Oregon State*	2
Washington (a.e.t.)	3
Kansas City*	1
Lindenwood	0
Cornell*	4
Lafayette	0
North Carolina* (p)	2 (6)
North Florida	2 (5)

Second round November 23
5	SMU*	0
Washington	1
Kansas City	0
12	Stanford*	1
13	UConn*	3
Cornell	1
North Carolina	1 (3)
4	Maryland* (p)	1 (4)

Third round November 29–30
Washington	1
12	Stanford*	0
13	UConn	0
4	Maryland*	3

Quarterfinals; December 5–6
Washington	3
4	Maryland*	1

*Host institution

==== Schedule ====
===== First round =====
November 20	Cornell	4–0	Lafayette	Ithaca, NY
5:00 p.m. EST	Sergio Zapata 7'; Connor Miller 51'; Adam Schaban 58' 68'	Report	Nikolas Hadjimitsis (yellow card) 48'	Stadium: Charles F. Berman Field; Attendance: 820

November 20	North Carolina	2–2 (a.e.t.) (6–5 p)	North Florida	Chapel Hill, NC
6:00 p.m. EST	Jack Sandmeyer 70'; Dan Klink 88'	Report	Luc Granitur 42' 90' (yellow card) 94'; David Perez (yellow card) 57'	Stadium: Dorrance Field; Attendance: 1,029; Referee: Kyle Johnston; Assistant referees: Raymond Thomas; Richard Wells; Fourth official: Clive Edwards
	Penalties
	Andrew Czech (penalty scored); Nacho Abeal (penalty scored); Javier Hernandez (penalty scored); Luca Nikolai (penalty scored); John McDowell (penalty scored); Gabriel Bracken Serra (penalty missed); Luis Vera (penalty scored)		Luc Granitur (penalty scored); Tyler Prebenda (penalty scored); Rafa Rios (penalty scored); Geraldo Neto (penalty scored); Anton Khelil (penalty scored); Mark Romano (penalty missed); Kaiss Mansouri (penalty missed)

November 20	Kansas City	1–0	Lindenwood	Kansas City, MO
6:00 p.m. CST	Kevin Nkumu 54' (yellow card) 72'; Team (yellow card) 80'	Report	Alander Soares (yellow card) 84'; Leandro Haesler (yellow card) 86'; Team (yellow card) 89'	Stadium: Durwood Soccer Stadium; Attendance: 809; Referee: Anthony Sobolevsky; Assistant referees: Albert Franklin; Raymond Shirley; Fourth official: Esad Omanović

November 20	Oregon State	2–3 (a.e.t.)	Washington	Corvallis, OR
6:00 p.m. PST	Fran Cortijo 4'; Tate Richards (yellow card) 28'; Pol Morlans (yellow card) 66'; Arnau Farnos 77'; Sava Catlett (yellow card) 81'	Report	Richie Aman (yellow card) 28' 104'; Harrison Bertos 57'; Connor Lofy 85'	Stadium: Paul Lorenz Field; Attendance: 1,220; Referee: Will Nicholls; Assistant referees: J. J. Blodgett; Eric Krueger; Fourth official: Pawel Sojka

===== Second round =====
November 23	(4) Maryland	1–1 (a.e.t.) (4–3 p)	North Carolina	College Park, MD
1:00 p.m. EST	Ritarita 43'; Leon Koehl (yellow card) 64'; UMD Team (yellow card) 84'	Report	Immanuel Mathe (yellow card) 40'; Callum Frogson (yellow card) 52'; Nacho Abeal 54'; Luca Nikolai (yellow card) 80'; Andrew Czech (yellow card) 107'	Stadium: Ludwig Field; Attendance: 3,061
	Penalties
	Sadam Masereka (penalty missed); Leon Koehl (penalty scored); Joseph Umberto Picotto (penalty scored); Lasse Kelp (penalty scored); Laurin Mack (penalty scored)		(penalty scored) Andrew Czech (penalty scored); (penalty missed) Javier Henandez; (penalty missed) Nacho Abeal; (penalty scored) Luca Nikolai; (penalty scored) John McDowell

November 23	(13) UConn	3–1	Cornell	Storrs, CT
2:00 p.m. EST	Austin Brummett 43' 45' (yellow card) 68'; UConn Team (yellow card) 45'; Nicolas Tomerius (yellow card) 56'; Evan Pickering (yellow card) 74'; Alex Tupay 78'; Max Gummesson (yellow card) 85'	Report	Connor Miller 37'; Cornell Team (yellow card) 45'; Campbell Reece (yellow card) 77'	Stadium: Morrone Stadium; Attendance: 2,048; Referee: Cedric Cook; Assistant referees: Jennifer Dumaine; Justen Lopez; Fourth official: David Bork

November 23	(5) SMU	0–1	Washington	Dallas, TX
1:00 p.m. CST	Villads Landsperg (yellow card) 5'	Report	Alex Hall (yellow card) 5'; UW Team (yellow card) 58'; Connor Lofy 72'	Stadium: Washburne Stadium; Attendance: 2,367; Referee: Rodrigo Albuquerque; Assistant referees: Jay Norris; Eric Guzman; Fourth official: Muhammad Kaleia

November 23	(12) Stanford	1–0	Kansas City	Stanford, CA
5:00 p.m. PST	Alfonso Tenconi-Gradillas 64'; Will Cleary (yellow card) 85'; Dylan Groeneveld (yellow card) 86'	Report		Stadium: Laird Q. Cagan Stadium; Attendance: 1,389; Referee: Bernhard Hosu; Assistant referees: Peter Hanson; Andrew Hanks; Fourth official: Oscar Guillen

===== Third round =====
November 29	(4) Maryland	3–0	(13) UConn	College Park, MD
1:00 p.m. EST	Albi Ndrenika 27'; Ritarita (yellow card) 32' (goal) 38'; UMD Team (yellow card) 64'; Luke van Heukelum 88'	Report	Austin Brummett (yellow card) 30' (yellow-red card) 64'; Ayoub Lajhar (yellow card) 32'; UConn Team (yellow card) 44' (yellow-red card) 86'; Max Gummesson (yellow card) 49'; Balthazar Saunders (yellow card) 64'	Stadium: Ludwig Field; Attendance: 3,043; Referee: Kevin Maurer; Assistant referees: Eric Weisbrod; Angelo Petruccy; Fourth official: Jason Blight

November 30	(12) Stanford	0–1	Washington	Stanford, CA
5:00 p.m. PST		Report	Charlie Kosakoff 88'	Stadium: Laird Q. Cagan Stadium; Attendance: 1,650; Referee: Brandon Stevis; Assistant referees: Ivan Sinkevich; Huseyin Celik; Fourth official: Victor Mba

===== Quarterfinals =====
December 6	(4) Maryland	1–3	Washington	College Park, MD
1:00 p.m. EST	Henry Bernstein 19'	Report	UW Team (yellow card) 19'; Osato Enabulele (yellow card) 30' (goal) 38'; Alex Hall (yellow card) 55' (goal) 70'; Charlie Kosakoff 55'	Stadium: Ludwig Field; Attendance: 4054

=== 2025 Men's College Cup ===
Semifinals; December 12; WakeMed Soccer Park; Cary, NC
16	Furman	1
Washington	3
15	NC State	2
Saint Louis	1

Championship; December 15 @ 7:00 pm EST; WakeMed Soccer Park; Cary, NC
Washington (a.e.t.)	3
15	NC State	2

=== Men's College Cup semifinals ===
December 12 Semifinal	(16) Furman	1–3	Washington	Cary, NC
6:00 p.m. EST	Gabe Cox (yellow card) 59'; Luke Hutzell 87'	Report	Zach Ramsey 32'; Charlie Kosakoff 40'; Asher Hestad 86'	Stadium: WakeMed Soccer Park; Attendance: 10945; Referee: Lukas Feathers; Assistant referees: Ankur Singh; Kristin Patterson; Fourth official: Kevin Maurer

December 12 Semifinal	(15) NC State	2–1	Saint Louis	Cary, NC
8:30 p.m. EST	Donavan Phillip 69'; Taig Healy 73'; Aidan Payne (yellow card) 80'; Isaac Heffess (yellow card) 81'	Report	Jeremi Abonne (yellow card) 69'; Quinten Blair 81' (pen.)	Stadium: WakeMed Soccer Park; Attendance: 10945; Referee: Austin Saini; Assistant referees: Jake Brochu; Dustin Killick; Fourth official: Nickrod Fateh

=== Men's College Cup final ===
December 15 Final	(15) NC State	2–3 (a.e.t.)	Washington	Cary, NC
7:00 p.m. EST	NCSU Team (yellow card) 44'; Donavan Phillip 66'; Taig Healy 87'	Report	Osato Enabulele (yellow card) 39'; Zach Ramsey 44'; UW Team (yellow card) 44'; Joe Dale 62'; Alex Hall (yellow card) 75'; Harrison Bertos 92'	Stadium: WakeMed Soccer Park; Attendance: 10316; Referee: Calin Radosav; Assistant referees: Jeremy Smith; Peter Hanson; Fourth official: Kyle Johnston

== Records by conference ==
Conference	Bids	Seeds	Record	Pct.	R32	S16	E8	F4	CG	NC
Big Ten	5	2	7-3-2	.667	3	2	2	1	1	1
ACC	9	4	8-7-3	.528	7	3	1	1	1	–
SoCon	2	1	2-2-3	.500	2	2	1	1	–	–
Atlantic 10	1	0	3-1-1	.700	1	1	1	1	–	–
Big East	5	3	5-5-1	.500	4	3	2	–	–	–
West Coast	3	2	1-3-1	.300	2	1	1	–	–	–
America East	2	2	1-1-1	.500	2	1	–	–	–	–
CAA	2	0	2-0-2	.750	1	1	–	–	–	–
Big South	1	1	1-1-0	.500	1	1	–	–	–	–
WAC	1	0	1-1-1	.500	1	1	–	–	–	–
Sun Belt	4	0	3-4-0	.429	3	–	–	–	–	–
Summit	2	0	2-1-1	.625	2	–	–	–	–	–
Ivy League	2	1	1-2-0	.333	2	–	–	–	–	–
Missouri Valley	1	0	1-1-0	.500	1	–	–	–	–	–
ASUN	1	0	0-0-1	.500	–	–	–	–	–	–
MAAC	1	0	0-0-1	.500	–	–	–	–	–	–
American	1	0	0-1-0	.000	–	–	–	–	–	–
Big West	1	0	0-1-0	.000	–	–	–	–	–	–
Horizon	1	0	0-1-0	.000	–	–	–	–	–	–
NEC	1	0	0-1-0	.000	–	–	–	–	–	–
Ohio Valley	1	0	0-1-0	.000	–	–	–	–	–	–
Patriot	1	0	0-1-0	.000	–	–	–	–	–	–

- The R32, S16, E8, F4, CG, and NC columns indicate how many teams from each conference were in the Round of 32 (second round), Round of 16 (third round), Quarterfinals (Elite Eight), Semifinals (Final Four), Championship Game, and National Champion, respectively.
- Matches concluded by a penalty shootout to determine advancement in the tournament following a drawn match are considered to be a tie for statistical purposes, except for the national championship game.

== Statistics ==
=== Top goalscorers ===
There were 99 goals scored in 40 matches, for an average of 2.48 goals per match (as of December 1, 2025).

4 goals

- (England) Laurie Goddard – Hofstra
- (Canada) Marcus Caldeira – West Virginia

3 goals

- (Indonesia) Mitchell Baker – Georgetown

2 goals

- (Canada) Remi Agunbiade – Akron
- (Nigeria) Muslim Umar – Bryant
- (United States) Connor Miller – Cornell
- (United States) Adam Schaba – Cornell
- (Norway) Daniel Burko – Hofstra
- (Philippines) Rocket Ritarita – Maryland
- (Saint Lucia) Donavan Phillip – NC State
- (United States) Luc Granitur – North Florida
- (United States) Joe Highfield – Portland
- (United States) Quinten Blair – Saint Louis
- (United States) Jack DiMaria – Saint Louis
- (United States) Austin Brummett – UConn
- (United States) Connor Lofy – Washington

1 goal

- (Canada) Matthew Paiva – Akron
- (Spain) Fermin Rodriguez – Bryant
- (Venezuela) Sergio Zapata – Cornell
- (United States) Kyle McGowan – Denver
- (Sweden) Holger Olsson – Denver
- (United States) Luke Schultz – Denver
- (Iceland) Úlfur Björnsson – Duke
- (Italy) Leonardo D'Ambrosio – Duke
- (United States) Kenan Hot – Duke
- (Mali) Mamadou Diarra – Florida Atlantic
- (Sweden) Andreas Raisanen – Florida Atlantic
- (United States) Wilfer Bustamante – Furman
- (United States) Trip Campbell – Furman
- (United States) Diego Hernandez – Furman
- (United States) Luke Hutzell – Furman
- (United States) Zach Zengue – Georgetown
- (Senegal) Junior Diouf – Grand Canyon
- (Senegal) Ben Assane Fall – Grand Canyon
- (El Salvador) Jefferson Amaya – High Point
- (United States) Noah Behrmann – High Point
- (Germany) Mo Guettel – High Point
- (Australia) Chris Niblock – High Point
- (Canada) Pablo Hempelmann-Perez – Hofstra
- (Poland) Jan Ziewiec – Hofstra
- (Democratic Republic of the Congo) Kevin Nkumu – Kansas City
- (Argentina) Agustin Lopez – Kentucky
- (Spain) David de la Víbora – Marshall
- (Netherlands) Luke van Heukelum – Maryland
- (United States) Taig Healy – NC State
- (England) Riley Moloney – NC State
- (Spain) Nacho Abea – North Carolina
- (United States) Dan Klink – North Carolina
- (United States) Jack Sandmeyer – North Carolina
- (Spain) Fran Cortijo – Oregon State
- (Spain) Arnau Farnós – Oregon State
- (United States) Jack Hunt – Princeton
- (Mexico) Diego Rosas – Portland
- (United States) Tanner Anderson – Saint Louis
- (United States) Iain Wagner – San Diego
- (Argentina) Agustin Resch – Seton Hall
- (Spain) Mario Navarro Perez – Siena
- (Brazil) Guilherme Gomes – St. John's
- (Poland) Björn Nikolajewski – St. John's
- (Canada) Gabe Smyth – St. John's
- (England) Alfonso Tenconi-Gradillas – Stanford
- (France) Clarence Awoudor – UCF
- (United States) Joey Mueller – UCF
- (France) Lilian Ricol – UCF
- (United States) Alex Tupay – UConn
- (Ghana) Issah Haruna – UNC Greensboro
- (United States) Pablo Torre – UNC Greensboro
- (Japan) Rui Aoki – Vermont
- (Germany) Philipp Kühn – Vermont
- (Jamaica) Nicholas Simmonds – Virginia
- (Denmark) AJ Smith – Virginia
- (United States) Richie Aman – Washington
- (United States) Harrison Bertos – Washington
- (United States) Charlie Kosakoff – Washington
- (United States) Nicolas Scargle – West Virginia
- (United States) Isaac Scheer – West Virginia
- (France) Mathieu Beuvain – Western Michigan

1 own goal

- (United States) Matthew Fisher – Michigan (vs. Notre Dame)

=== Top assists ===
There were 100 assists scored in 40 matches, for an average of 2.5 goals per match (as of December 2, 2025).

2 assists

- (United States) Wilfer Bustamante – Furman
- (Iceland) Thengill Orrason – Hofstra
- (Uganda) Sadam Masereka – Maryland
- (Spain) Rafa Rios – North Florida
- (Liberia) Ayoub Lajhar – UConn
- (United States) Omar Robbana – Vermont
- (United States) Zach Ramsey – Washington
- (Israel) Ethan Dekel-Daks – West Virginia
- (Spain) Pablo Pozos – West Virginia

1 assist

- (Serbia) Stefan Dobrijević – Akron
- (United States) Tyler Morck – Akron
- (United States) Jack Roman – Akron
- (Spain) Fernando Delgado – Bryant
- (Spain) Paco Fernandez – Bryant
- (United States) Mamadi Jiana – Bryant
- (Spain) Jorge Veintimilla – Bryant
- (United States) Westin Carnevale – Cornell
- (United States) Aidan Martin – Cornell
- (United States) Connor Miller – Cornell
- (United States) Dominik Kolbl – Cornell
- (Venezuela) Sergio Zapata – Cornell
- (New Zealand) Keegan Kelly – Denver
- (United States) Kamran Acito – Duke
- (Iceland) Ulfur Björnsson – Duke
- (Mali) Mamadou Diarra – Florida Atlantic
- (Ivory Coast) Aboubacar Traore – Florida Atlantic
- (United States) Diego Hernandez – Furman
- (United States) Landon Hill – Furman
- (United States) Luke Hutzell – Furman
- (Indonesia) Mitchell Baker – Georgetown
- (United States) Aidan Godinho – Georgetown
- (Argentina) Mateo Ponce-Ocampo – Georgetown
- (United States) Zach Zengue – Georgetown
- (United States) Felipe Cobian – Grand Canyon
- (United States) Allan Rosales – Grand Canyon
- (Portugal) Xande Santos – Grand Canyon
- (United States) Daniel Lugo – High Point
- (United States) Aleksei Armas – Hofstra
- (New Zealand) Owen Barnett – Hofstra
- (Norway) Daniel Burko – Hofstra
- (Cyprus) Evangelos Chrysostomou – Hofstra
- (Australia) Samuel Francou – Hofstra
- (England) Laurie Goddard – Hofstra
- (France) Joackim Betina – Kansas City
- (France) Mathias Baucher – Kansas City
- (United States) Jace Clark – Maryland
- (Philippines) Rocket Ritarita – Maryland
- (Germany) Chris Steinleitner – Maryland
- (United States) Taig Healy – NC State
- (United States) Drew Lovelace – NC State
- (England) Riley Moloney – NC State
- (United States) Aidan Payne – NC State
- (United States) Carlos Santamaria – NC State
- (South Africa) Calem Tommy – NC State
- (Sweden) Charlie Antonelius – North Carolina
- (Denmark) Bertil Hansen – North Carolina
- (Germany) Luca Nikolai – North Carolina
- (United States) Gabriel Serra – North Carolina
- (United States) Mark Romano – North Florida
- (Spain) Arnau Farnós – Oregon State
- (United States) Miguel-Angel Hernandez – Portland
- (Mexico) Diego Rosas – Portland
- (United States) Jack Jasinski – Princeton
- (France) Jeremi Abonnel – Saint Louis
- (United States) Jack DiMaria – Saint Louis
- (Brazil) Theo Franca – Saint Louis
- (Canada) Carlos Leatherman – Saint Louis
- (United States) Jaxson Findlay – San Diego
- (France) Hugo Gerbore – Seton Hall
- (Belgium) Martin Piedeleu – Siena
- (Sweden) Eric Svensson – Siena
- (United States) Jack Pymm – Stanford
- (Croatia) Julian Jakopović – St. John's
- (Canada) Ank Nibogora – St. John's
- (Ghana) Godwin Partey – St. John's
- (United States) Andrew Porucznik – St. John's
- (United States) Charlie Holmes – UConn
- (United States) Evan Pickering – UConn
- (United States) Balthazar Saunders – UConn
- (United States) Marco Valentic – UConn
- (France) Clarence Awoudor – UCF
- (United States) Joey Mueller – UCF
- (Ivory Coast) Claudel N'goubou – UCF
- (Senegal) Malick Thiaw – UCF
- (Ghana) Issah Haruna – UNC Greensboro
- (Canada) Daniel Longo – UNC Greensboro
- (Spain) Marcos Blasco – Vermont
- (United States) Marco Dos Santos – Virginia
- (United States) Gabe Fernandez – Washington
- (United States) Juan Alvarez – West Virginia
- (United States) Isaac Scheer – West Virginia

== See also ==
- 2025 NCAA Division I women's soccer tournament
