= Jarred Brookins =

American soccer coach (born 1990)

Current position
- Title: Head coach
- Team: Oregon State
- Conference: Pac-12

Biographical details
- Born: August 13, 1990 (age 36); Vestavia Hills, Alabama, U.S.
- Education: Birmingham–Southern College

Playing career
- 2009–2012: Birmingham–Southern College

Coaching career (HC unless noted)
- 2013–2018: Vestavia Hills Soccer Club
- 2018–2021: Mercer Bears (assistant)
- 2021–2023: Davidson Wildcats (assistant)
- 2023–2025: Oregon State Beavers (assistant)
- 2025–: Oregon State Beavers

Head coaching record
- Overall: 10–5–2 (.647)
- Tournaments: 0–1–0 (.000)

Jarred Brookins (born August 13, 1990) is an American soccer coach, who is currently the head men's soccer coach at Oregon State University.

== Career ==
=== Playing career ===
Jarred Brookins began his playing career in his hometown of Vestavia Hills, Alabama, playing high school soccer for Vestavia Hills High School, where he captained the team his senior year of high school, and earned various All-Metro and All-State high school honors in 2009. Additionally, Brookins earned the Thompson Reynolds Scholar Athlete Award in 2009. Brookins went on to play college soccer at Birmingham–Southern College. There, Brookins made 47 appearances for the Panthers, scoring once.

=== Coaching career ===
After graduating from college, Brookins worked full-time as a chemical analyst for Alabama Power, while coaching part-time for his former youth soccer club, Vestavia Hills Soccer Club. In 2015, he began coaching full-time, where he led Vestavia Hills to seven USYS Youth Soccer State Championships between 2014 and 2018. There, he began his collegiate coaching role being hired as an assistant coach for Mercer University, and then Davidson College.

In 2023, Brookins was then hired by Oregon State University to be part of Greg Dalby's coaching staff. Ahead of the 2025 NCAA Division I men's soccer season, Dalby left Oregon State to coach at the U.S. Air Force Academy. Subsequently, Brookins was named the head coach of Oregon State's soccer program. In his first season with the Beavers, Brookins posted a 10–5–2 record, and got the Beavers into the 2025 NCAA Division I men's soccer tournament, where in the first round, they lost to eventual national champions, Washington.

== Head coaching record ==
Record table
Season	Team	Overall	Conference	Standing	Postseason
Oregon State (West Coast Conference) (2025–2025)
2025	Oregon State	10–5–2	6–1–2	3rd	NCAA first round
Oregon State (Pac-12 Conference) (2026–present)
2026	Oregon State	0–0–0	0–0–0	—	—
Oregon State:		10–5–2 (.647)	6–1–2 (.778)		
Total:		10–5–2 (.647)			
National champion Postseason invitational champion Conference regular season champion Conference regular season and conference tournament champion Division regular season champion Division regular season and conference tournament champion Conference tournament champion
