= 2025 Furman Paladins men's soccer team =

American college soccer season

2025 Furman Paladins men's soccer

SoCon regular season and tournament champions

NCAA Tournament, College Cup semifinals
- Conference: Southern Conference
- U. Soc. Coaches poll: No. 3
- TopDrawerSoccer.com: No. 3
- Record: 16–2–5 (4–0–1 SoCon)
- Head coach: Doug Allison (31st season)
- Assistant coaches: Bret Boulware; Brandon Tucker; Charlie Arndt
- Home stadium: Stone Stadium

2025 Southern Conference men's soccer standings
	Conf.					Overall
Team	W		L		T	W		L		T
No. 3 Furman †‡	4	–	0	–	1	16	–	2	–	5
Mercer	3	–	1	–	1	5	–	9	–	4
No. 14 UNCG +	3	–	2	–	0	12	–	5	–	6
ETSU	2	–	3	–	0	2	–	9	–	4
VMI	1	–	4	–	0	3	–	12	–	3
Wofford	1	–	4	–	0	6	–	11	–	2
† – Conference champion ‡– 2025 SoCon tournament Champion + – At-large invitation to the 2025 NCAA tournament; As of May 2, 202r Rankings from United Soccer Coaches; Source: SoCon

The 2025 Furman Paladins men's soccer team represented Furman University during the 2025 NCAA Division I men's soccer season. The Paladins were led by head coach Doug Allison, in his 31st and final season in charge; Allison had announced his retirement before the season. The Paladins played their home games at Stone Stadium in Greenville, South Carolina, and competed in the Southern Conference (SoCon).

Furman was picked to finish second in the SoCon preseason coaches' poll and began the season ranked twentieth by TopDrawerSoccer. The Paladins opened with a 3–0 win over UC San Diego, Allison's 350th career victory. Their only regular season loss came on September 16, 1–0 at home to College of Charleston, and they did not lose again until the College Cup. A 2–0 win at Wofford on November 1 clinched Furman's 22nd SoCon regular season title, with an unbeaten 4–0–1 conference record. Furman then swept the SoCon's individual awards: Diego Hernandez was named Player of the Year, Ivan Horvat Goalkeeper of the Year, Braden Dunham Freshman of the Year, and Allison Coach of the Year for the tenth time.

As the top seed in the SoCon Tournament, Furman defeated Wofford 4–2 in the semifinals and UNC Greensboro 1–0 in double overtime in the final to win its second straight tournament title. The Paladins received the sixteenth national seed and a first-round bye in the NCAA Tournament. Ranked first by TopDrawerSoccer for the first time in program history, Furman defeated Western Michigan, Hofstra on penalty kicks, and eighth seed Portland to reach the College Cup for the first time. The Paladins lost 3–1 to Washington in the national semifinals on December 12, ending Allison's 31-year career with a record of 365–175–77. Furman finished 16–2–5 and third in the final United Soccer Coaches poll, the program's best final ranking. Hernandez was named a first-team All-American, and the coaching staff was named the United Soccer Coaches national staff of the year. Following the season, associate head coach Brandon Tucker was promoted to succeed Allison.

== Previous season ==
The Paladins finished the 2024 season 9–4–6. They won the SoCon Tournament and, in the NCAA Tournament, defeated nationally ranked North Carolina on penalty kicks before losing in the second round. Aaron Salinas was named SoCon Goalkeeper of the Year.

== Player movement ==
=== Players leaving ===
Departures
Name	Number	Pos.	Height	Weight	Year	Hometown	Reason for Departure
Slade Starnes	5	DF	6'3"	185	Junior	Dallas, Texas	—
Ivan Agyaakwah	6	MF	6'1"	190	Senior	London, England	Graduated
Christian Kraus	22	FW	6'2"	205	Senior	Fenton, Missouri	Graduated

=== Players arriving ===
==== Recruiting class ====
Furman's 2025 recruiting class was ranked seventh nationally by TopDrawerSoccer.

Name	Nat.	Hometown	Club
Braden Dunham; DF	USA	Peachtree City, Georgia	Atlanta United
Luke Munson; DF	USA	Little Elm, Texas	Charlotte FC
Gianluca Rizzo; DF	USA	Eastchester, New York	New York City FC
Connor Stout; DF	USA	Fairfax, Virginia	FC Cincinnati
Grayson Travis; MF	USA	Louisville, Kentucky	Louisville City

== Squad ==
=== Roster ===
As of December 12, 2025

Note: Flags indicate national team as defined under FIFA eligibility rules; some limited exceptions apply. Players may hold more than one non-FIFA nationality.

No.	Pos.	Nation	Player
0	GK	USA	Max Miller
1	GK	USA	Aaron Salinas
2	DF	USA	Reece Fragle
3	MF	USA	Trip Campbell
4	DF	USA	Connor Dunnigan
5	DF	USA	Ryan Wagner
6	MF	USA	Luke Hutzell
7	MF	ENG	Ben Boxall
8	MF	USA	Wesley Siegel
9	FW	ENG	Lloyd Wamu Snell
10	MF	USA	Diego Hernandez
11	MF	USA	Caleb Johnson
13	MF	USA	Wesley Goodwin
14	MF	USA	Miguel Sosa
15	DF	USA	Jack Travis

No.	Pos.	Nation	Player
16	MF	USA	Grayson Travis
17	FW	USA	Wilfer Bustamante
19	MF	USA	Landon Hill
20	FW	USA	Ryan Reid
21	FW	USA	Jackson Price
22	DF	USA	Gianluca Rizzo
24	DF	USA	Connor Stout
25	DF	USA	Braden Dunham
26	MF	USA	Beck Dean
27	DF	USA	Luke Munson
29	MF	JAM	Malachi Grant
30	GK	SVK	Ivan Horvat
31	GK	USA	Andrew Laplaca
33	MF	USA	Gabe Cox

=== Team management ===
Position	Staff
Head coach	Doug Allison
Associate head coach	Bret Boulware
Associate head coach	Brandon Tucker
Volunteer assistant coach	Charlie Arndt

== Schedule ==
Date Time, TV	Rank^{#}	Opponent^{#}	Result	Record	Site (Attendance) City, State
Regular season
August 21*; 3:30 p.m., ESPN+		vs. UC San Diego; John Rennie Nike Invitational	W 3–0	1–0–0	Koskinen Stadium (410); Durham, NC
August 24*; 1:00 p.m.		vs. No. 10 San Diego; John Rennie Nike Invitational	T 0–0	1–0–1	Koskinen Stadium (107); Durham, NC
August 28*; 7:00 p.m.		North Greenville(D-II)	W 6–2	2–0–1	Stone Stadium (306); Greenville, SC
August 31*; 6:00 p.m., ESPN+		No. 14 Duke; Clint Dempsey Night	T 1–1	2–0–2	Stone Stadium (2,828); Greenville, SC
September 4*; 6:00 p.m., ESPN+		Davidson; Gray Griffin Memorial Game	W 3–2	3–0–2	Stone Stadium (390); Greenville, SC
September 9*; 5:00 p.m., ACCNX		at No. 14 Virginia Tech	T 0–0	3–0–3	Thompson Field (774); Blacksburg, VA
September 12*; 6:00 p.m., ESPN+		at No. 7 Gardner–Webb	W 4–1	4–0–3	Greene–Harbison Stadium (250); Boiling Springs, NC
September 16*; 6:00 p.m., ESPN+	No. 15	College of Charleston	L 0–1	4–1–3	Stone Stadium (465); Greenville, SC
September 22*; 7:00 p.m., ESPN+	No. 15	Charlotte	W 1–0	5–1–3	Stone Stadium (322); Greenville, SC
September 30*; 7:00 p.m.	No. 25	USC Upstate	W 6–1	6–1–3	Stone Stadium (1,050); Greenville, SC
October 4; 7:30 p.m.	No. 25	at Mercer	T 1–1	6–1–4 (0–0–1)	Betts Stadium (535); Macon, GA
October 7*; 6:00 p.m.		Presbyterian	W 3–2	7–1–4	Stone Stadium (300); Greenville, SC
October 11; 7:00 p.m., ESPN+		East Tennessee State; Senior Night	W 3–2	8–1–4 (1–0–1)	Stone Stadium (301); Greenville, SC
October 18; 3:00 p.m.		at VMI	W 3–0	9–1–4 (2–0–1)	Patchin Field (312); Lexington, VA
October 21*; 6:00 p.m., ESPN+		at UNC Asheville	W 2–1	10–1–4	Greenwood Soccer Field (250); Asheville, NC
October 25; 7:00 p.m., ESPN+		No. 23 UNC Greensboro; Quinn Game	W 2–0	11–1–4 (3–0–1)	Stone Stadium (806); Greenville, SC
November 1; 7:00 p.m., ESPN+	No. 16	at Wofford	W 2–0	12–1–4 (4–0–1)	Snyder Field (176); Spartanburg, SC
SoCon Tournament
November 9*; 2:00 p.m., ESPN+	(1) No. 14	(5) Wofford; Semifinals	W 4–2	13–1–4	Stone Stadium (887); Greenville, SC
November 16*; 2:00 p.m., ESPN+	(1) No. 13	(2) No. 18 UNC Greensboro; Final	W 1–0 ^{2OT}	14–1–4	Stone Stadium (2,018); Greenville, SC
NCAA Tournament
November 23*; 1:00 p.m., ESPN+	(16) No. 13	Western Michigan; Second round	W 1–0	15–1–4	Stone Stadium (2,205); Greenville, SC
November 30*; 1:00 p.m., ESPN+	(16) No. 13	No. 22 Hofstra; Third round	T 3–3 ^{2OT, 5–4 pen.}	15–1–5	Stone Stadium (1,676); Greenville, SC
December 5*; 10:00 p.m., ESPN+	(16) No. 13	at (8) No. 6 Portland; Quarterfinals	W 1–0	16–1–5	Merlo Field (4,252); Portland, OR
December 12*; 6:00 p.m., ESPNU	(16) No. 13	vs. No. 23 Washington; College Cup semifinals	L 1–3	16–2–5	First Horizon Stadium; Cary, NC
*Non-conference game. ^{#}Rankings from United Soccer Coaches. (#) Tournament seedings in parentheses. All times are in Eastern.

== Goals record ==
Final statistics.

Rank	No.	Nat.	Po.	Name	Regular season	SoCon Tournament	NCAA Tournament	Total
1	10	(United States)	MF	Diego Hernandez	8	1	1	10
2	17	(United States)	FW	Wilfer Bustamante	7	0	1	8
3	25	(United States)	DF	Braden Dunham	4	2	1	7
4	6	(United States)	MF	Luke Hutzell	3	0	2	5
5	20	(United States)	FW	Ryan Reid	3	1	0	4
6	11	(United States)	MF	Caleb Johnson	3	0	0	3
6	19	(United States)	MF	Landon Hill	3	0	0	3
6	22	(United States)	DF	Gianluca Rizzo	2	1	0	3
9	3	(United States)	MF	Trip Campbell	1	0	1	2
10	4	(United States)	DF	Connor Dunnigan	1	0	0	1
10	5	(United States)	DF	Ryan Wagner	1	0	0	1
10	8	(United States)	MF	Wesley Siegel	1	0	0	1
10	9	(England)	FW	Lloyd Wamu Snell	1	0	0	1
10	16	(United States)	MF	Grayson Travis	1	0	0	1
10	33	(United States)	MF	Gabe Cox	1	0	0	1
Total					40	5	6	51

== Disciplinary record ==
Final statistics. Does not include two cautions issued to the Furman team.

Rank	No.	Nat.	Po.	Name	Regular Season			SoCon Tournament			NCAA Tournament			Total		
Rank	No.	Nat.	Po.	Name	Yellow card	(yellow card) (yellow-red card)	Red card	Yellow card	(yellow card) (yellow-red card)	Red card	Yellow card	(yellow card) (yellow-red card)	Red card	Yellow card	(yellow card) (yellow-red card)	Red card
1	5	(United States)	DF	Ryan Wagner	5	1	0	0	0	0	1	0	0	6	1	0
2	6	(United States)	MF	Luke Hutzell	6	0	0	0	0	0	1	0	0	7	0	0
3	33	(United States)	MF	Gabe Cox	2	0	0	1	0	0	1	0	0	4	0	0
4	10	(United States)	MF	Diego Hernandez	3	0	0	0	0	0	0	0	0	3	0	0
4	22	(United States)	DF	Gianluca Rizzo	2	0	0	0	0	0	1	0	0	3	0	0
4	25	(United States)	DF	Braden Dunham	3	0	0	0	0	0	0	0	0	3	0	0
7	4	(United States)	DF	Connor Dunnigan	2	0	0	0	0	0	0	0	0	2	0	0
7	8	(United States)	MF	Wesley Siegel	2	0	0	0	0	0	0	0	0	2	0	0
7	17	(United States)	FW	Wilfer Bustamante	1	0	0	0	0	0	1	0	0	2	0	0
7	27	(United States)	DF	Luke Munson	2	0	0	0	0	0	0	0	0	2	0	0
11	2	(United States)	DF	Reece Fragle	1	0	0	0	0	0	0	0	0	1	0	0
11	3	(United States)	MF	Trip Campbell	1	0	0	0	0	0	0	0	0	1	0	0
11	7	(England)	MF	Ben Boxall	1	0	0	0	0	0	0	0	0	1	0	0
11	9	(England)	FW	Lloyd Wamu Snell	0	0	0	0	0	0	1	0	0	1	0	0
11	11	(United States)	MF	Caleb Johnson	0	0	0	1	0	0	0	0	0	1	0	0
11	14	(United States)	MF	Miguel Sosa	1	0	0	0	0	0	0	0	0	1	0	0
11	15	(United States)	DF	Jack Travis	1	0	0	0	0	0	0	0	0	1	0	0
11	20	(United States)	FW	Ryan Reid	0	0	0	1	0	0	0	0	0	1	0	0
11	24	(United States)	DF	Connor Stout	1	0	0	0	0	0	0	0	0	1	0	0
11	29	(Jamaica)	MF	Malachi Grant	1	0	0	0	0	0	0	0	0	1	0	0
Total					35	1	0	3	0	0	6	0	0	44	1	0

== Awards and honors ==
Recipient	Award	Date	Ref.
Aaron Salinas	United Soccer Coaches Goalkeepers to Watch	August 1	
Wilfer Bustamante	Preseason All-SoCon Team	August 18	
Luke Hutzell	Preseason All-SoCon Team	August 18	
Lloyd Wamu Snell	Preseason All-SoCon Team	August 18	
Aaron Salinas	Preseason All-SoCon Team	August 18	
Ryan Wagner	Preseason All-SoCon Team	August 18	
Braden Dunham	TopDrawerSoccer Preseason Freshman Best XI	August 20	
Ivan Horvat	SoCon Defensive Player of the Week	August 26	
Landon Hill	SoCon Offensive Player of the Week	September 2	
Diego Hernandez	TopDrawerSoccer National Team of the Week	September 9	
Ivan Horvat	SoCon Defensive Player of the Week; TopDrawerSoccer National Team of the Week	September 16	
Caleb Johnson	SoCon Offensive Player of the Week	September 16	
Ivan Horvat	SoCon Defensive Player of the Week	September 23	
Braden Dunham	SoCon Offensive Player of the Week	October 7	
Diego Hernandez	MAC Hermann Trophy Watch List	October 10	
Diego Hernandez	SoCon Offensive Player of the Week; TopDrawerSoccer National Team of the Week	October 14	
Ryan Wagner	SoCon Defensive Player of the Week	October 28	
Diego Hernandez	SoCon Player of the Year; All-SoCon First Team	November 6	
Ivan Horvat	SoCon Goalkeeper of the Year; All-SoCon First Team; SoCon All-Freshman Team	November 6	
Braden Dunham	SoCon Freshman of the Year; All-SoCon First Team; SoCon All-Freshman Team	November 6	
Doug Allison	SoCon Coach of the Year	November 6	
Wilfer Bustamante	All-SoCon First Team	November 6	
Luke Hutzell	All-SoCon First Team	November 6	
Ryan Wagner	All-SoCon Second Team	November 6	
Ryan Reid	All-SoCon Second Team; SoCon All-Freshman Team	November 6	
Connor Stout	All-SoCon Second Team; SoCon All-Freshman Team	November 6	
Luke Munson	SoCon All-Freshman Team	November 6	
Luke Hutzell	TopDrawerSoccer National Team of the Week	December 2	
Diego Hernandez	TopDrawerSoccer National Player of the Year finalist	December 5	
Diego Hernandez	United Soccer Coaches All-South Region First Team	December 9	
Braden Dunham	United Soccer Coaches All-South Region Second Team	December 9	
Diego Hernandez	MAC Hermann Trophy semifinalist	December 9	
Diego Hernandez	United Soccer Coaches All-America First Team	December 12	
Doug Allison and staff	United Soccer Coaches National Coaching Staff of the Year	December 19	
Diego Hernandez	TopDrawerSoccer Best XI First Team	December 19	
Braden Dunham	TopDrawerSoccer Freshman Best XI	December 19	
Connor Stout	TopDrawerSoccer Freshman Best XI	December 19	
Ivan Horvat	TopDrawerSoccer Freshman Best XI	December 19	

== Rankings ==
Ranking movements Legend: ██ Increase in ranking ██ Decrease in ranking — = Not ranked RV = Received votes
	Week																	
Poll	Pre	1	2	3	4	5	6	7	8	9	10	11	12	13	14	15	16	Final
United Soccer	RV	RV	RV	RV	15	RV	25	RV	—	RV	16	14	13	Not released				3
TopDrawer Soccer	20	20	20	9	9	3	10	7	16	11	8	7	5	5	2	1	1	3
College Soccer News	—	—	25	19	9	15	19	25	RV	RV	19	15	13	12	Not released			
