= Muslim Umar =

Nigerian footballer (born 2003)

Personal information
- Date of birth: June 7, 2003 (age 23)
- Place of birth: Lagos, Nigeria
- Height: 1.80 m (5 ft 11 in)
- Position: Forward

Youth career
- Edmonton Internazionale SC
- BTB Academy
- –2019: FC Edmonton
- 2019–: Vancouver Whitecaps
- –2022: BTB Academy
- 2022: Sacramento Republic FC

College career
Years	Team	Apps	(Gls)
2022–2024	Portland Pilots	51	(8)
2025	Bryant Bulldogs	15	(2)

Senior career*
Years	Team	Apps	(Gls)
2021	FC Edmonton	0	(0)
2021	York United	1	(0)
2023	Thunder Bay Chill	6	(0)
2025–	Fort Wayne FC	5	(2)
- * Club domestic league appearances and goals as of July 28, 2025

Muslim Umar, also known as Mugsy Umar, (born 7 June 2003) is a Nigerian footballer who plays for Fort Wayne FC in USL League Two.

== Early life ==
Born in the Nigerian capital of Lagos, Umar and his family emigrated to Canada and settled in Edmonton when he was young. He played youth soccer with Edmonton Internazionale SC and BTB Academy, later moving on to the academy of FC Edmonton. In August 2019, he joined the Vancouver Whitecaps Academy., later returning to BTB Academy. In July 2021, Umar was selected by German football giants Bayern Munich to be a part of their world squad to compete in friendlies around the world. He returned to his youth club, following his stint with York United FC in 2021. In 2022, he played with the Sacramento Republic FC academy.

== College career ==
In November 2020, Umar committed to attend the University of Portland to play for the men's soccer team, joining for the 2022 season. On August 26, 2022, he made his collegiate debut, recording his first assist against the Central Arkansas Bears. On September 25, 2022, he scored his first collegiate goal against the Utah Tech Trailblazers. At the end of his first season, he was named to the West Coast Conference All-Freshman Team. In 2024, he earned WCC All-Academic Honorable Mention.

In 2025, he moved to Bryant University to play for the men's soccer team for his senior season. On November 23, 2025, he scored his first goal in a 1-0 victory over the Seton Hall Pirates in the second round of the 2025 NCAA Division I men's soccer tournament, to help Bryant record their first-ever NCAA tournament victory.

== Club career ==
In September 2021, Umar joined Canadian Premier League club FC Edmonton and made an appearance on the bench in a game against Valour FC on September 7. Later in the month, on September 23 fellow CPL side York United announced Umar had joined the team on a developmental contract until the end of the season. He made his professional debut on November 9 against Forge FC. In December 2021, York announced that Umar's deal had ended and that he would return to his youth club.

In 2023, he joined the Thunder Bay Chill in USL League Two. In 2025, he joined Fort Wayne FC in USL League Two.

== Career statistics ==
As of July 28, 2025

Club	Season	League			Playoffs		Domestic Cup		Continental		Total	
Club	Season	Division	Apps	Goals	Apps	Goals	Apps	Goals	Apps	Goals	Apps	Goals
FC Edmonton	2021	Canadian Premier League	0	0	—		0	0	—		0	0
York United FC	2021	Canadian Premier League	1	0	0	0	0	0	—		1	0
Thunder Bay Chill	2023	USL League Two	6	0	0	0	—		—		6	0
Fort Wayne FC	2025	USL League Two	5	2	2	0	—		—		7	2
Career total			12	2	2	0	0	0	0	0	14	2
