= Dan Klink =

Ghanaian footballer

Daniel Klink
Personal information
- Full name: Daniel Klink
- Date of birth: August 18, 2007 (age 19)
- Place of birth: Monkton, Maryland, U.S.
- Position: Winger

Team information
- Current team: North Carolina Tar Heels
- Number: 9

Youth career
- 2022–2025: Pipeline SC
- 2023–2025: Loyola Blakefield Dons

College career
Years	Team	Apps	(Gls)
2025–	North Carolina Tar Heels	26	(7)

Dan Klink (born August 18, 2007) is an American soccer player who plays college soccer for the University of North Carolina at Chapel Hill. Klink is the 2025 recipient of the Gatorade High School Soccer Player of the Year Award, an annual award for the best high school athletes in the nation.

== Career ==
=== Youth and high school ===
Klink was born and raised in the Baltimore metropolitan area, and grew up in Monkton, Maryland, a suburb north of Baltimore.

Klink played high school soccer at Loyola Blakefield in Towson, Maryland, while also competing at the club level for Pipeline SC in the Elite Clubs National League (ECNL). During his high school career, Klink established himself as one of the top youth players in the United States, leading Loyola Blakefield to a combined record of 33–2–6 and back-to-back Maryland Interscholastic Athletic Association (MIAA) A Conference Championships in 2023 and 2024. At the club level, he helped Pipeline SC achieve a 105–7–6 record, winning four conference titles in the ECNL.

Individually, Klink earned numerous accolades. He was named the 2024–25 Gatorade National Boys Soccer Player of the Year and the 2024 United Soccer Coaches High School National Player of the Year. He was also honored as the Gatorade Maryland Boys Soccer Player of the Year and the United Soccer Coaches Maryland State Player of the Year in both 2023 and 2024. In addition, Klink received United Soccer Coaches All-America honors across the high school, club, and ECNL levels and was inducted into the National High School Coaches Association Hall of Fame.

=== College ===
On July 27, 2023, ahead of junior year of high school, Klink committed to play college soccer for the North Carolina Tar Heels men's soccer program. Ahead of the 2025 NCAA Division I men's soccer season, Klink joined the roster and received the number nine jersey. In his first game for the Tar Heels, Klink scored a hat trick with three header goals. Klink finished the regular season with 12 appearances and five total goals for the Heels.
