= Rocket Ritarita =

Filipino footballer

Personal information
- Full name: Elijah Rocket Toroc Ritarita
- Date of birth: April 16, 2007 (age 19)
- Place of birth: Canton, Georgia, United States
- Height: 1.75 m (5 ft 9 in)
- Position: Winger

Team information
- Current team: Maryland Terrapins
- Number: 11

Youth career
- 2019–2023: Atlanta United FC

College career
Years	Team	Apps	(Gls)
2025–	Maryland Terrapins	18	(3)

Senior career*
Years	Team	Apps	(Gls)
2023–2024	Atlanta United 2	5	(0)
2024–2025	Crown Legacy FC	10	(2)

International career^{‡}
2026	Philippines U19	2	(0)
2026–	Philippines	1	(0)
- * Club domestic league appearances and goals as of 14:04, 3 August 2026 (UTC) ‡ National team caps and goals as of 14:04, 3 August 2026 (UTC)

Elijah Rocket Toroc Ritarita (born 16 April 2007) is a professional footballer who plays as a winger for the Maryland Terrapins. Born in the United States, he plays for the Philippines national team.

== Club career ==
He was called up to the 2023 MLS Next All-Star Game. He joined Charlotte FC in 2024, where he was assigned to their reserve team Crown Legacy FC. Ritarita joined the college soccer team, the Maryland Terrapins.

== International career ==
Born in the United States, Ritarita is of Filipino descent and holds dual American and Filipino citizenship. He was called up to a training camp for the United States U16s in October 2023. He was called up to the Philippines U19s for the 2026 ASEAN U-19 Boys Championship. A couple of months later, he was called up to the senior Philippines national team for the 2026 ASEAN Championship.
