= Téva Lossec =

Tahitian footballer (born 2002)

Personal information
- Full name: Téva Pierre David Lossec
- Date of birth: 3 December 2002 (age 23)
- Place of birth: Papeete, Tahiti
- Height: 1.70 m (5 ft 7 in)
- Position: Left-back

Team information
- Current team: Stade Plabennécois

College career
| Years | Team | Apps | (Gls) |
| 2023–2024 | Campbell Fighting Camels | 28 | (4) |
| 2025 | UNC Greensboro | 22 | (1) |

Senior career*
| Years | Team | Apps | (Gls) |
| 2020–2023 | Brest B | 32 | (1) |
| 2026– | Stade Plabennécois | 0 | (0) |

International career
| 2023– | Tahiti | 10 | (1) |
Medal record
Men's football
Representing Tahiti
OFC Nations Cup
| Third place | 2024 Fiji/Vanuatu |
- * Club domestic league appearances and goals

Téva Pierre David Lossec (born 3 December 2002) is a Tahitian footballer who plays as a left-back for Stade Plabennécois.

== Early life ==
Lossec was born in 2002 in Tahiti to French parents. He moved to the Metropolitan France when he was little and started playing football at the age of four in local clubs.

== Club career ==
Lossec was a youth product of the Brest academy.

In 2023, Lossec attended Campbell University in the United States and studied sports management. He played for the soccer team of the college Campbell Fighting Camels.

== International career ==
Lossec is a Tahiti international. He played for the Tahiti national football team at the 2023 Pacific Games and the 2024 OFC Men's Nations Cup.

== Style of play ==
Lossec mainly operates as a left-back. He can also play as a striker.

== Honours ==
- OFC Nations Cup: 3rd place 2024
