= Junior Diouf =

Senegalese footballer (born 2007)

Personal information
- Full name: Raymond Junior Devis Diouf
- Date of birth: 2007 (age 18–19)
- Place of birth: Thiès, Senegal
- Height: 1.85 m (6 ft 1 in)
- Position: Forward

Team information
- Current team: Beveren

Youth career
- 2017–2022: Rise Academy Thiès
- 2022–2025: St. Benedict's Grey Bees
- 2025: Cedar Stars Rush
- 2026–: Beveren

College career
Years	Team	Apps	(Gls)
2025	Grand Canyon Antelopes	21	(18)

Senior career*
Years	Team	Apps	(Gls)
2026–	Beveren	0	(0)
- * Club domestic league appearances and goals as of 7 March 2026

Raymond Junior Devis Diouf (born 2007), commonly known as Junior Diouf, is a Senegalese footballer who plays for Beveren in the Challenger Pro League.

Prior to Beveren, Diouf played college soccer in the United States for Grand Canyon University. There, Diouf became the first freshman to win the TopDrawerSoccer.com National Player of the Year Award.

== Career ==
=== Youth and college ===
Junior Diouf began playing soccer at age 10 with Rise Academy in Senegal, where he developed as an attacking player before later moving to the United States to continue his career.

Diouf attended St. Benedict's Preparatory School in Newark, New Jersey, one of the top high school soccer programs in the country. During the 2024 season, he scored 26 goals and recorded 11 assists, helping Saint Benedict's finish with a perfect 20–0–0 record. The team won the New Jersey State Interscholastic Athletic Association Non-Public A state championship and the Essex County Tournament title, and finished the season ranked No. 1 nationally in the United Soccer Coaches Fall Boys Team Rankings. Diouf scored the game-winning goal in the 1–0 victory in the Non-Public A title match and was named to the New Jersey All-State First Team.

Diouf began his collegiate career at Grand Canyon University in 2025. As a freshman, he made an immediate impact, appearing in 21 matches with 20 starts and finishing the season with 18 goals, the second-most in NCAA Division I across all competitions.

His early collegiate performances included a brace in the season opener against Jacksonville, becoming the first Grand Canyon freshman to score two goals in a match since 2023. He later recorded a goal and an assist in a 3–1 win against Cleveland State, scored against Sacramento State, and converted a 90th-minute penalty against Santa Clara.

Following the season, Diouf received several national and conference honors. He was named a MAC Hermann Trophy finalist, becoming the first freshman finalist for the award, and was selected as the TopDrawer Soccer Player of the Year and Freshman of the Year, the first freshman to win the outlet's player of the year honor. He was also named United Soccer Coaches First Team All-American and United Soccer Coaches All-Far West Region First Team.

At the conference level, Diouf was named Western Athletic Conference Offensive Player of the Year and WAC Freshman of the Year. He was also selected to the All-WAC First Team, All-WAC Freshman Team, and All-WAC Tournament Team. During the season, he earned multiple weekly honors, including WAC Offensive Player of the Week and selections to the TopDrawerSoccer Team of the Week.

=== Professional ===
Following the conclusion of the 2025 NCAA Division I men's soccer season, Diouf was considered a potential top five pick in the 2026 MLS SuperDraft. However, Diouf opted to forgo the SuperDraft and play in Europe. On 4 March 2026, Diouf joined Belgan side, S.K. Beveren on a two-and-a-half year contract, with a club option for a third year.

== Honors and awards ==
- United Soccer Coaches D-I Men's First Team All-America - 2025
- TopDrawerSoccer Player of the Year: 2025
- TopDrawerSoccer Freshman of the Year: 2025
- WAC Offensive Player of the Year: 2025
- WAC Freshman of the Year: 2025
- All-WAC First Team: 2025
- All-WAC Freshman Team: 2025
- All-WAC Tournament Team: 2025
