= Doug Allison (footballer) =

English soccer player and coach

Personal information
- Place of birth: Bath, England
- Position: Forward

College career
Years	Team	Apps	(Gls)
1984–1987	South Carolina Gamecocks		

Managerial career
- 1989–1990: North Carolina Tar Heels (assistant)
- 1991–1994: South Carolina Gamecocks (assistant)
- 1995–: Furman Paladins

Doug Allison is an English soccer coach and retired soccer player. He is currently the head coach of the Furman University men's soccer team.

== Playing career ==
In 1984, Allison moved to the United States to attend the University of South Carolina. Between 1984 and 1987, he was a four-year starter on the South Carolina Gamecocks men's soccer team. He led the Gamecocks in scoring each of his four seasons and holds the team's all-time career scoring record with 63 goals and 32 assists for 158 points. He was a 1987 First Team All American and First Team Academic All American. With the Gamecocks, he led the team to three NCAA tournament appearances in 1985, 1986, and 1987.

== Coaching career ==
Allison took over the Furman Paladins men's soccer program in 1995. Since taking over in 1995, Allison has established himself as one of men's college soccer's most successful coaches, with a 0.648 win percentage and 349 career victories as of 2024.

In 2025, Allison led Furman to the program's first-ever appearance in the NCAA Final 4 (College Cup).

== Personal life ==
Allison is a native of Bath, England.
