= Bryant Bulldogs men's soccer =

American college soccer team

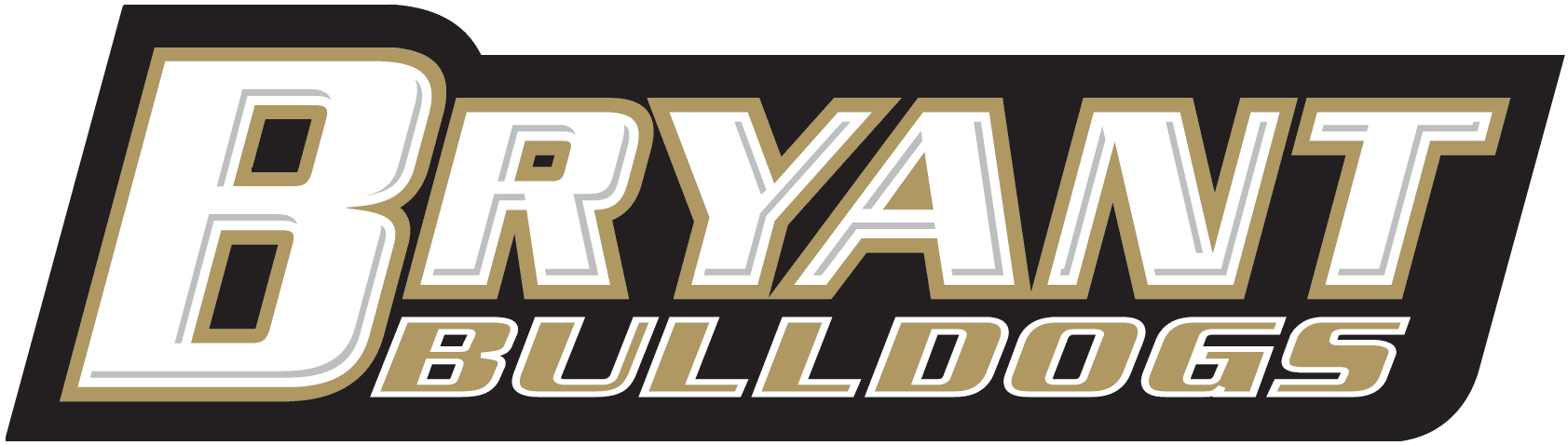
- Founded: 1968; 58 years ago
- University: Bryant University
- Head coach: Ruben Resendes (4th season)
- Conference: America East
- Location: Smithfield, Rhode Island, US
- Stadium: Beirne Stadium (capacity: 4,400)
- Nickname: Bulldogs
- Colors: Black and gold
Home	Away

NCAA tournament Round of 16
- 2025

NCAA tournament Round of 32
- 2025

NCAA tournament appearances
- 2023, 2025

Conference tournament championships
- 2023

The Bryant Bulldogs men's soccer team represents Bryant University in NCAA Division I college soccer. Bryant competes in the America East Conference. The Bulldogs are led by head coach Ruben Resendes.

== History ==
Bryant has made two NCAA tournament appearances in 2023 and 2025.

In 2023, the Bulldogs were a stellar 16–2–2, winning the America East championship before losing in the NCAA tournament first round to Yale 1–0.

In 2025, Bryant again had one of its best seasons in program history with a 16–2–2 record and automatic Round of 32 NCAA tournament bid. In 2025, the Bulldogs reached as high as No. 2 in the national rankings and were the No. 11 seed in the national tournament.

== Current squad ==
As of November 2026

Note: Flags indicate national team as defined under FIFA eligibility rules; some limited exceptions apply. Players may hold more than one non-FIFA nationality.

No.	Pos.	Nation	Player
1	GK	USA	Ramon Camejo
2	DF	USA	Jaiden Willems
3	DF	ESP	Nacho Vila
4	DF	ESP	Nacho Garcia
5	MF	ESP	Fernando Guerrero
6	MF	ESP	Marcos Blasco
7	MF	ESP	David Vilan
8	MF	ESP	Jorge Veintimilla
10	FW	ESP	Fermin Rodriguez
12	DF	USA	Jojo Ocran
13	DF	ESP	Eloi Goni
14	MF	ESP	Victor Sala
15	DF	ISR	Ilay Krespi
16	MF	ESP	Paco Fernandez
17	MF	ESP	Jesus Martins
18	FW	PUR	Jorge Rodriguez
19	FW	ESP	Pablo Maya

No.	Pos.	Nation	Player
20	FW	USA	Brady Geho
21	FW	ESP	Angel Perez
22	DF	ESP	Santiago de Prado
23	MF	ESP	Manuel Morillo
24	MF	USA	Deji Akinboboye
25	MF	USA	Billy Gillespie
26	DF	ESP	Sergi Marcillo
27	MF	USA	Caleb Chao
28	DF	USA	Christien Merritt
29	DF	CAN	Joseph Perrotta
30	GK	ESP	Aimar Penalver
31	MF	USA	Felipe De Andrade
32	DF	USA	Ethen Horrobin
33	DF	BER	Michael Outerbridge
35	DF	USA	Eric Causey
40	GK	USA	Justin DiCarlo
99	GK	USA	Kai Yandall
