= 2007 Wake Forest Demon Deacons men's soccer team =

Represented Wake Forest University during the 2007 NCAA Division I men's soccer season

2007 Wake Forest Demon Deacons men's soccer

NCAA Tournament National Champions Carolina Nike Classic Champions
- Conference: Atlantic Coast Conference
- U. Soc. Coaches poll: No. 1
- TopDrawerSoccer.com: No. 1
- Record: 22–2–2 (6–1–1 ACC)
- Head coach: Jay Vidovich (14th season)
- Assistant coach: Carson Porter (4th season)
- Captains: Corben Bone; Marcus Tracy
- Home stadium: Spry Stadium

The 2007 Wake Forest Demon Deacons men's soccer team represented Wake Forest University during the 2007 NCAA Division I men's soccer season. It was the 28th season for the Demon Deacons, and their 28th in the Atlantic Coast Conference.

The 2007 season was the first, and so far only, season where the program won the NCAA Division I Men's Soccer Tournament, where they bested Ohio State in the championship match. The Deacons won the match 2-1, in a come-from behind victory. Wake Forest's Marcus Tracy tied the match in the 66th minute, while Zack Schilawski scored the match-winner in the 74th minute.

== Background ==
Wake Forest finished the 2006 season as the regular season co-champions alongside Duke. They were given the number two seed for the 2006 ACC Men's Soccer Tournament, in which they lost to Duke in the championship game 0–1. Despite the loss, the team earned a place in the 2006 NCAA Division I Men's Soccer Tournament as the two seed for an at-large bid. After beating Santa Clara in the quarterfinals, Wake Forest would go on to face UC Santa Barbara in the College Cup. However, they would lose to UC Santa Barbara 3–4 on penalties.

== Review ==
As of the 2018 NCAA Division I Men's Soccer Tournament, the 2007 title remains the only title won in Wake Forest program history. The team would have three players, Pat Phelan, Brian Edwards, and Julian Valentin, selected in the 2008 MLS SuperDraft, with Phelan picked in the first round.

== Roster ==
The following players played on the 2007 team.

Note: Flags indicate national team as defined under FIFA eligibility rules; some limited exceptions apply. Players may hold more than one non-FIFA nationality.

| No. | Pos. | Nation | Player |
|---|---|---|---|
| 0 | GK | USA | Akira Fitzgerald |
| 1 | GK | USA | Brian Edwards |
| 2 | MF | USA | Sam Cronin |
| 4 | DF | USA | Julian Valentin |
| 5 | DF | USA | Pat Phelan |
| 6 | MF | USA | Austin da Luz |
| 7 | MF | USA | Cline Beam |
| 9 | FW | USA | Marcus Tracy |
| 10 | MF | USA | Corben Bone |
| 11 | MF | USA | Jamie Franks |
| 12 | FW | USA | Zack Schilawski |
| 13 | MF | SLE | Michael Lahoud |
| 15 | FW | USA | Alimer Gonzalez |
| 16 | DF | USA | David Murphy |

| No. | Pos. | Nation | Player |
|---|---|---|---|
| 17 | FW | USA | Cody Arnoux |
| 18 | DF | USA | Evan Brown |
| 19 | FW | USA | Nick Courtney |
| 20 | DF | USA | Jeff Leach |
| 21 | MF | USA | Russ Coleman |
| 23 | DF | USA | Ike Opara |
| 24 | MF | USA | Ryan Swaim |
| 25 | MF | USA | Will Clayton |
| 26 | DF | USA | Justin Lichtfuss |
| 27 | MF | USA | Dylan Sansone |
| 28 | MF | USA | Josh Henke |
| 30 | FW | JAM | Lyle Adams |
| 31 | GK | USA | Austin Chelko |

== Schedule ==
=== Preseason ===
| August 20 | Furman | 0–2 | ^{No. 2} Wake Forest | Greenville, South Carolina |
| 6:00 PM EST | Tracy 48'; Bone 82' | Report | Erwood (yellow card) 83' | Stadium: Eugene E. Stone III Stadium; Attendance: 455; Referee: Alex Prus |

| August 25 | ^{No. 2} Wake Forest | 2–1 | Cincinnati | Winston-Salem, North Carolina |
| EST | Franks 8'; Arnoux 21' | Report | Telting 60'; Gradwell (yellow card) 79' | Stadium: W. Dennie Spry Soccer Stadium; Attendance: 2,982; Referee: Ronni Canales |

=== Regular season ===
| August 31 1 ((Carolina Nike Classic) | ^{No. 2} Wake Forest | 2–1 (2OT) | ^{No. 20} Old Dominion | Chapel Hill, NC |
| 5:00 PM EDT | Bone 26'; Brown 107' | Report | Emmanuel 30' (yellow card) 34'; Beaulieu (yellow card) 61' | Stadium: Fetzer Field; Attendance: 212; Referee: Alex Pruss |

| September 2 2 ((Carolina Nike Classic) | ^{No. 2} Wake Forest | 2–1 | Monmouth | Chapel Hill, NC |
| 4:30 PM EDT | Arnoux 41', 43' | Report | Millar (yellow card) 71' | Stadium: Fetzer Field; Attendance: 171; Referee: Mark Kadlecik |

| September 7 3 | ^{No. 1} Wake Forest | 3–1 | ^{No. 16} Akron | Winston-Salem, NC |
| 7:30 PM EDT | Bone 15', 56'; Arnoux 73' (yellow card) 80' | Report | Zemanski 1'; McKenney (yellow card) 65' | Stadium: Spry Stadium; Attendance: 2,489; Referee: Lee Suckle |

| September 9 4 | ^{No. 1} Wake Forest | 3–0 | Bradley | Winston-Salem, NC |
| 2:30 PM EDT | Courtney 66'; Tracy 74'; Bone 75' | Report | | Stadium: Spry Stadium; Attendance: 743 |

| September 15 5 | ^{No. 1} Wake Forest | 1–0 | Louisville | Winston-Salem, NC |
| 7:30 PM EDT | Tracy 78' | Report | Murray (yellow card) 81' | Stadium: Spry Stadium; Attendance: 1,124; Referee: Shane Moody |

| September 21 6 | ^{No. 1} Clemson | 0–1 | Wake Forest | Clemson, SC |
| 5:00 PM EDT | Twum (yellow card) 49'; Petrone (yellow card) 49' | Report | Arnoux 34'; Beam (yellow card) 40'; Cronin (yellow card) 49' | Stadium: Riggs Field; Attendance: 1,278; Referee: Alex Prus |

| September 29 7 | ^{No. 1} Wake Forest | 2−0 | ^{No. 18} Maryland | Winston-Salem, NC |
| 7:00 PM EDT | Schilawski 40'; Arnoux 90' | Report | | Stadium: Spry Stadium; Attendance: 3,817; Referee: Brent Sorg |

| October 2 8 | ^{No. 1} Wake Forest | 1–1 (2OT) | Elon | Winston-Salem, NC |
| 7:00 PM EDT | Brown (yellow card) 9'; Opara 74'; Adams (yellow card) 105' | Report | Wyatt 43' (yellow card) 56' | Stadium: Spry Stadium; Attendance: 767; Referee: Mark Kadlesic |

| October 5 9 | ^{No. 9} Virginia Tech | 3–3 (2OT) | ^{No. 1} Wake Forest | Blacksburg, VA |
| 7:00 PM EDT | Edmans 47', 74'; Baden (yellow card) 81'; Nyarko 86' | Report | Cronin 27', 54'; Bone 34' (yellow card) 57'; Brown (yellow card) 63' | Stadium: Thompson Field; Attendance: 2,413; Referee: Mario Scilipoti |

| October 9 10 | ^{No. 2} Wake Forest | 5–0 | Appalachian State | Winston-Salem, NC |
| 7:00 PM EDT | Phelan 2', 6'; Valentin (yellow card) 14'; Arnoux 19'; Schilawski 69'; 83' (ASU o.g.) | Report | Muniz (yellow card) 22' | Stadium: Spry Stadium; Attendance: 1,024; Referee: Ken Henriques |

| October 13 11 | ^{No. 2} Wake Forest | 4–0 | NC State | Winston-Salem, NC |
| 7:00 PM EDT | Schilawski 17', 23'; Opara (yellow card) 36'; Arnoux 64'; Clayton 79' | Report | Di Laudo (yellow card) 36'; Shanchez (yellow card) 39'; Mathurin (yellow card) 44' (red card) 50' | Stadium: Spry Stadium; Attendance: 3,528; Referee: Lee Suckle |

| October 16 12 | UNC Greensboro | 0–8 | ^{No. 2} Wake Forest | Greensboro, NC |
| 7:00 PM EDT | Worthen (yellow card) 39' | Report | Arnoux 12' 15'; Franks 13'; Adams 26'; Lahoud 39', 54'; Tracy 56'; Gonzalez 89' | Stadium: UNCG Soccer Stadium; Attendance: 853; Referee: Mark Kadlecik |

| October 19 13 | ^{No. 15} Duke | 0–3 | ^{No. 1} Wake Forest | Durham, NC |
| 7:00 PM EDT | Dugoni (yellow card) 46'; Ibeagha (yellow card) 68'; Grella (red card) 83' | Report | Arnoux 8'; Tracy 26'; Lahoud 30' | Stadium: Koskinen Stadium; Attendance: 5,176; Referee: Andy Chapin |

| October 23 14 | Coastal Carolina | 0–5 | ^{No. 1} Wake Forest | Conway, SC |
| 7:00 PM EDT | Holstein (yellow card) 30' | Report | Adams 7'; Tracy 24' 33'; da Luz (yellow card) 30' (goal) 62'; Valentin 64' | Stadium: Coastal Carolina University Soccer Field; Attendance: 612; Referee: Roni Carales |

| October 27 15 | ^{No. 12} Boston College | 1–0 | ^{No. 1} Wake Forest | Chestnut Hill, MA |
| 7:00 PM EDT | Bedoya 21'; Shefler (yellow card) 59'; Hepburn (yellow card) 77' | Report | Phelan (yellow card) 76' | Stadium: Newton Soccer Complex; Attendance: 733; Referee: Lee Suckle |

| November 3 16 | ^{No. 2} Wake Forest | 2–0 | North Carolina | Winston-Salem, NC |
| 7:00 PM EDT | Adams 5'; Cronin 87' | Report | | Stadium: Spry Stadium; Attendance: 4,538; Referee: Roni Canoles |

| November 6 17 | ^{No. 1} Wake Forest | 5–1 | Davidson | Winston-Salem, NC |
| 7:00 PM EDT | Schilawski 41', 61'; Phelan (yellow card) 61'; Arnoux 62', 63'; Leach 68' | Report | O'Donnell 76' | Stadium: Spry Stadium; Attendance: 1,117; Referee: Jeffrey Gontarek |

| November 9 18 | ^{No. 1} Wake Forest | 3–1 | Virginia | Winston-Salem, NC |
| 8:00 PM EDT | Lahoud 5'; Schilawski 35'; Adams 70' | Report | LaBeaux 43' | Stadium: Spry Stadium; Attendance: 3,791; Referee: Abbey Okulaja |

=== ACC Tournament ===
| November 14 Quarterfinals | ^{No. 1} Wake Forest | 3–1 | Clemson | Cary, North Carolina |
| 8:00 PM EDT | Arnoux 37'; Tracy (yellow card) 69' (goal) 90'; Courtney (yellow card) 71'; Valentin 89' | Report | Moore (yellow card) 53'; Ursy (yellow card) 69'; Brooks 72'; Poe (yellow card) 89' | Stadium: SAS Soccer Stadium; Attendance: 989; Referee: Mario Scilipoti |

| November 16 Semifinals | ^{No. 1} Wake Forest | 1–0 (a.e.t.) | North Carolina | Cary, North Carolina |
| 8:00 PM EDT | Valentin (yellow card) 18'; Tracy 100' | Report | Carvajal (yellow card) 1'; Ababio (yellow card) 27'; Sherard (yellow card) 67' | Stadium: SAS Soccer Stadium; Attendance: 2,773; Referee: Joe Carroccio |

| November 18 Final | ^{No. 1} Wake Forest | 1–2 | ^{No. 6} Boston College | Cary, North Carolina |
| 3:30 PM EDT | da Luz 69' | Report | Manswell 8'; Gallington (yellow card) 31'; Konicoff 47' | Stadium: SAS Soccer Stadium; Attendance: 2,039; Referee: Abby Okulajah |

=== NCAA Tournament ===
| November 28 Second round | ^{No. 1} Wake Forest | 1–0 | ^{No. 20} Furman | Winston-Salem, North Carolina |
| 7:00 PM EST | Valentin 23'; Adams (yellow card) 65' | Report | Salinas (yellow card) 60'; Leathers (yellow card) 71' | Stadium: W. Dennie Spry Soccer Stadium; Attendance: 1,443; Referee: Andrew Chapin |

| December 2 Third round | ^{No. 1} Wake Forest | 3–1 | ^{No. 15} West Virginia | Winston-Salem, North Carolina |
| 1:00 PM EST | Schilawski 56'; Arnoux 65', 87'; Adams (yellow card) 81' | Report | Halsell (yellow card) 45'; Wright 50' (pen.); Stratford (yellow card) 76'; Maworere (yellow card) 20' (yellow-red card) 85' | Stadium: W. Dennie Spry Soccer Stadium; Attendance: 1,614; Referee: Andrew Chapin |

| December 8 Quarterfinals | ^{No. 1} Wake Forest | 1–0 (a.e.t.) | ^{No. 10} Notre Dame | Winston-Salem, North Carolina |
| 7:00 PM EST | da Luz 97' | Report | Besler (yellow card) 95' | Stadium: W. Dennie Spry Soccer Stadium; Attendance: 4,589; Referee: Rob Mann |

==== College Cup ====
| December 14 Semifinals | ^{No. 1} Wake Forest | 2–0 | ^{No. 8} Virginia Tech | Cary, North Carolina |
| 5:00 PM EST | Tracy 51', 83'; Arnoux (yellow card) 67' | Report | Edmans (yellow card) 34'; Shupp (yellow card) 51' | Stadium: SAS Soccer Park; Attendance: 8,172; Referee: Alex Gorin |

| December 16 Final | ^{No. 1} Wake Forest | 2–1 | ^{No. 14} Ohio State | Cary, North Carolina |
| 3:00 PM EST | Schilawski (yellow card) 37' (goal) 78'; Adams (yellow card) 62'; Tracy 66' | Report | Espinoza 13' (yellow card) 81'; Verhoff (yellow card) 17'; Roan (yellow card) 74'; Latchem (yellow card) 78' | Stadium: SAS Soccer Park; Attendance: 8,172; Referee: Misail Tsapos |

== Statistics ==
Players with no appearances not included in the list.
As of match played December 16, 2007

| No. | Player | GP | G | A | Pts. | Sh. | Shot% | SOG | SOG% | GW | Pk. | Pk. At. |
|---|---|---|---|---|---|---|---|---|---|---|---|---|
| 17 | Cody Arnoux | 26 | 15 | 8 | 38 | 58 | .259 | 34 | .586 | 5 | 0 | 0 |
| 9 | Marcus Tracy | 26 | 11 | 9 | 31 | 51 | .216 | 24 | .471 | 3 | 0 | 0 |
| 12 | Zack Schilawski | 26 | 9 | 4 | 22 | 36 | .250 | 20 | .556 | 5 | 0 | 0 |
| 2 | Sam Cronin | 26 | 3 | 8 | 14 | 33 | .091 | 11 | .333 | 0 | 0 | 1 |
| 13 | Michael Lahoud | 24 | 4 | 4 | 12 | 31 | .129 | 13 | .419 | 0 | 1 | 1 |
| 6 | Austin da Luz | 25 | 3 | 13 | 19 | 31 | .097 | 12 | .387 | 1 | 0 | 0 |
| 10 | Corben Bone | 20 | 5 | 8 | 18 | 22 | .227 | 11 | .500 | 1 | 0 | 0 |
| 5 | Patrick Phelan | 25 | 2 | 4 | 8 | 20 | .100 | 6 | .300 | 1 | 1 | 1 |
| 18 | Evan Brown | 26 | 1 | 6 | 8 | 19 | .053 | 7 | .368 | 1 | 0 | 0 |
| 30 | Lyle Adams | 26 | 4 | 2 | 10 | 15 | .267 | 7 | .467 | 2 | 0 | 0 |
| 11 | Jamie Franks | 23 | 1 | 3 | 5 | 10 | .100 | 5 | .500 | 0 | 0 | 0 |
| 23 | Ike Opara | 26 | 1 | 1 | 3 | 9 | .111 | 5 | .556 | 0 | 0 | 0 |
| 4 | Julian Valentin | 20 | 3 | 2 | 8 | 8 | .375 | 5 | .625 | 2 | 0 | 0 |
| 15 | Alimer Gonzalez | 9 | 1 | 0 | 2 | 7 | .143 | 4 | .571 | 0 | 0 | 0 |
| 20 | Jeff Leach | 9 | 1 | 0 | 2 | 5 | .200 | 2 | .400 | 0 | 0 | 0 |
| 7 | Cline Beam | 14 | 0 | 0 | 0 | 5 | .000 | 0 | .000 | 0 | 0 | 0 |
| 25 | Will Clayton | 7 | 1 | 0 | 2 | 2 | .500 | 2 | 1.000 | 0 | 0 | 0 |
| 19 | Nick Courtney | 12 | 1 | 0 | 2 | 2 | .500 | 1 | .500 | 1 | 0 | 0 |
| 24 | Ryan Swaim | 9 | 0 | 0 | 0 | 1 | .000 | 1 | 1.000 | 0 | 0 | 0 |
| 0 | Akira Fitzgerald | 4 | 0 | 0 | 0 | 0 | .000 | 0 | .000 | 0 | 0 | 0 |
| 16 | David Murphy | 6 | 0 | 0 | 0 | 0 | .000 | 0 | .000 | 0 | 0 | 0 |
| 31 | Austin Chelko | 1 | 0 | 0 | 0 | 0 | .000 | 0 | .000 | 0 | 0 | 0 |
| 26 | Justin Lichtfuss | 12 | 0 | 0 | 0 | 0 | .000 | 0 | .000 | 0 | 0 | 0 |
| 1 | Brian Edwards | 24 | 0 | 1 | 1 | 0 | .000 | 0 | .000 | 0 | 0 | 0 |
