= Wake Forest Demon Deacons men's soccer =

American college soccer team

Wake Forest Demon Deacons
- 2026 Wake Forest Demon Deacons men's soccer team
- Founded: 1980
- University: Wake Forest University
- Head coach: Bobby Muuss (12th season)
- Conference: ACC
- Location: Winston-Salem, North Carolina, US
- Stadium: Spry Stadium (capacity: 3,000)
- Nickname: Demon Deacons
- Colors: Old gold and black
Home	Away

NCAA tournament championships
- 2007

NCAA tournament runner-up
- 2016

NCAA tournament College Cup
- 2006, 2007, 2008, 2009, 2016, 2019

NCAA tournament appearances
- 1988, 1989, 1990, 1991, 1999, 2001, 2002, 2003, 2004, 2005, 2006, 2007, 2008, 2009, 2011, 2012, 2013, 2014, 2015, 2016, 2017, 2018, 2019, 2020, 2021, 2022, 2023, 2024

Conference tournament championships
- 1989, 2016, 2017, 2024

Conference regular season championships
- 2002, 2004, 2006, 2008, 2009, 2015, 2017, 2018

The Wake Forest University Demon Deacons men's soccer team is an NCAA Division I college soccer team composed of students attending Wake Forest University in Winston-Salem, North Carolina. They achieved their greatest result in 2007, winning the 2007 Division I Men's College Cup. Like all sports teams from Wake Forest, men's soccer competes in the Atlantic Coast Conference (ACC). The Deacons play their home matches at Spry Stadium on the campus of Wake Forest.

== History ==
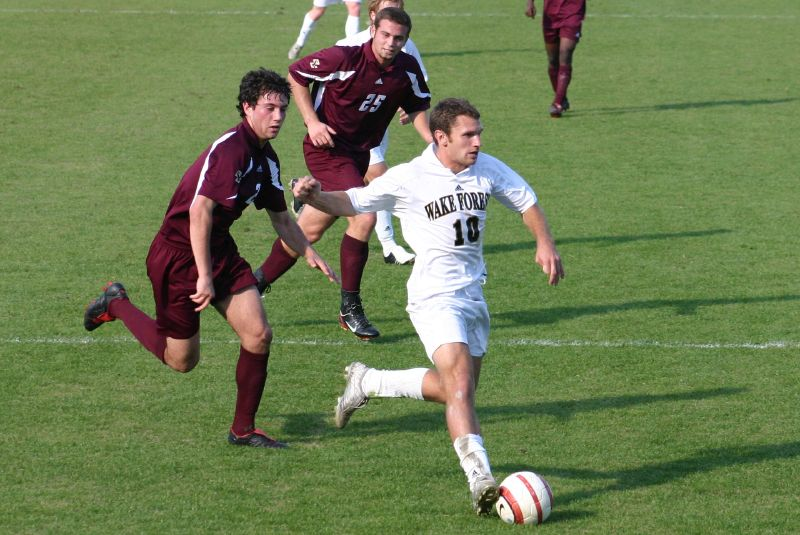
Wake Forest (in white) v Boston College in 2005

Wake Forest fielded its first team in 1980, under the coaching of George Kennedy. The Deacons went 12–9–1 in their first season. They won their first ACC game that season, defeating Maryland 2–1. Coach Kennedy led Wake Forest through 1985 finishing with a 62–55–12 overall record and 6–27–3 in the ACC. Walt Chyzowych took over the program in 1986 until his death just prior to the 1994 season. Coach Chyzowych took the Deacons to a 77–59–22 overall record and 15–25–7 in the ACC in his eight seasons. The Deacons played in their first NCAA Tournament in 1988, losing in the first round to North Carolina. Since 1988, Wake Forest has reached the NCAA tournament 15 times. Jay Vidovich, an assistant under Coach Chyzowych, was named Head Coach in 1994. In 19 seasons under Coach Vidovich, the Deacons went 254–103–48 overall and 65–44–22 in the ACC.

To date, Wake Forest has won the ACC Regular Season Title in 2002, 2004, 2006, 2008, 2009, 2015, and 2017. They won the ACC Tournament in 1989, 2016, and 2017. With their inclusion in the 2009 College Cup, the Demon Deacons reached four consecutive College Cups, becoming the ninth team in NCAA history to achieve this feat.

=== 2007 NCAA Champions ===
The most successful season in team history took place in 2007, when Wake Forest won the NCAA Division I Championship in a 2–1 decision over Ohio State. It marked the program's only championship to date. During their championship run, the No. 2 seeded Deacons defeated Furman 1–0, No. 15 West Virginia 3–1, and No. 10 Notre Dame 2–1 in overtime to reach the College Cup. In the semifinals, Marcus Tracy scored twice in a 2–0 win over Virginia Tech. In the final, Wake Forest scored two second half goals to come from behind to defeat Ohio State 2–1 to win the National Championship.

== Coaching staff ==
Position	Name
Head Coach	Bobby Muuss
Associate Head Coach	Steve Armas
Associate Head Coach	Dane Brenner
Assistant Coach	Ade Taiwo

== Notable alumni ==
=== Current professionals ===
As of March 18, 2025
The players in bold have senior international caps.

- (United States) Steve Holeman (1987–1990) currently head coach with Texas State
- (United States) John Hackworth (1991–1992) currently interim head coach with St. Louis City SC
- (United States) Mike McGinty (1991–1994) currently assistant coach with North Carolina FC
- (United States) Kelvin Jones (2000–2003) currently assistant coach with San Diego FC
- (United States) James Riley (2001–2004) currently head coach with Ballard FC
- (United States) Brian Edwards (2003–2007) currently goalkeeping coach with Charlotte FC
- (United States) Jamie Franks (2005–2008) currently head coach with Denver
- (United States) Zack Schilawksi (2006–2009) currently assistant coach with Pittsburgh
- (United States) Ike Opara (2007–2009) currently assistant coach with Sporting Kansas City II
- (Japan) Akira Fitzgerald (2007–2010) currently with North Carolina FC
- (United States) Chris Duvall (2010–2013) currently assistant coach with St. Louis City 2
- (United States) Collin Martin (2012) currently with North Carolina FC
- (United States) Ian Harkes (2013–2016) currently with San Jose Earthquakes
- (Spain) Jon Bakero (2014–2017) currently with Charlotte Independence
- **Steven Echevarria** (2014–2017) currently with Colorado Springs Switchbacks and has 1 cap for Puerto Rico
- (England) Jack Harrison (2015) currently with Everton F.C.
- (United States) Brad Dunwell (2015–2018) currently with Midwest United FC
- (Brazil) Bruno Lapa (2016–2019) currently with Ansan Greeners FC
- **Mark McKenzie** (2017) currently with Toulouse FC and has 17 caps for United States
- **Brandon Servania** (2017) currently with D.C. United and has 1 cap for the United States
- (United States) Omir Fernandez (2017–2018) currently with Colorado Rapids
- **Machop Chol** (2017–2020) currently with FK Žalgiris and has 3 caps for South Sudan
- **Alistair Johnston** (2018–2019) currently with Celtic FC and has 51 caps for Canada
- (United States) Michael DeShields (2018–2020) currently with Charlotte Independence
- (United States) Isaiah Parente (2018–2020) currently with LA Galaxy
- (England) Calvin Harris (2019–2020) currently with Colorado Rapids
- (United States) Nico Benalcazar (2019–2021) currently with FC Cincinnati 2
- (United States) Omar Hernandez (2019–2022) currently with Chattanooga Red Wolves SC
- (United States) Jahlane Forbes (2020–2023) currently with Charlotte FC
- (Japan) Hosei Kijima (2020–2023) currently with D.C. United
- (United States) Garrison Tubbs (2020–2023) currently with D.C. United
- Tareq Shihab (2021) currently with HK and has 2 caps for Yemen
- (Trinidad and Tobago) Roald Mitchell (2021–2023) currently with New York Red Bulls

== Wake Forest seasons ==
Season	Conference Record						Conference Tourn. Pos.	Overall Record					Honors	Top points		Top scorer	
Season	Conference	Pld.	W	L	D	Pos.	Conference Tourn. Pos.	Pld.	W	L	D	Natl. Rank	Honors	Top points		Top scorer	
1980	ACC	6	1	5	0	7th		22	12	9	1			Rob Burt	25	Kenny Bauchle/Rob Burt	17
1981	ACC	6	3	3	0	5th		21	9	10	2			Mark Erwin	39	Mark Erwin	17
1982	ACC	6	1	5	0	6th		21	9	10	2			Mark Erwin	21	Mark Erwin	8
1983	ACC	6	0	4	2	7th		21	13	5	3			Mark Erwin	79	Mark Erwin	36
1984	ACC	6	1	4	1	6th		22	12	7	3			Henry Riggs-Miller	25	Flip Kenyon/Henry Riggs-Miller	9
1985	ACC	6	0	6	0	7th		22	7	14	1			Henry Riggs-Miller	23	Henry Riggs-Miller	11
1986	ACC	6	0	6	0	7th		20	7	11	2			Chris Wentz	13	Chris Wentz	6
1987	ACC	6	1	4	1	6th	QF	20	5	13	2			Nigel McNamera	17	Nigel McNamera	7
1988	ACC	6	3	1	2	2nd	QF	20	11	5	4		NCAA 1st Round	Nigel McNamera	24	Nigel McNamera	10
1989	ACC	6	4	1	1	2nd	W	21	15	4	2		NCAA 2nd Round	Geraint Davies	29	Geraint Davies	11
1990	ACC	6	1	4	1	7th	SF	21	10	7	4		NCAA 1st Round	Nigel McNamera	16	Nigel McNamera	6
1991	ACC	6	3	2	1	3rd	F	21	13	5	3		NCAA 1st Round	John Duguid	27	John Duguid	11
1992	ACC	5	2	3	0	5th	QF	17	9	6	2			Steve Gillmor	18	Andrew Chang/Steve Gillmor	7
1993	ACC	6	1	4	1	6th	QF	18	7	8	3			Steve Gillmor	13	Steve Gillmor	6
1994	ACC	6	1	5	0	7th	QF	19	10	8	1			Ryan Scott	18	Ryan Scott	7
1995	ACC	6	2	4	0	5th	QF	20	11	8	1			Serge Daniv	17	Trent Lind	6
1996	ACC	6	3	3	0	3rd	SF	20	12	7	1			Josh Timbers	23	Josh Timbers	8
1997	ACC	6	2	4	0	6th	SF	20	10	10	0			Ihor Dotsenko	20	Ihor Dotsenko	8
1998	ACC	6	1	4	1	6th	QF	19	11	7	1			Greg Krauss	22	Greg Krauss	10
1999	ACC	6	2	1	3	3rd	SF	21	13	3	5		NCAA 2nd Round	Christian Lonteen	20	Ben Stafford	8
2000	ACC	6	2	4	0	5th	SF	19	10	7	2			Ben Stafford	38	Ben Stafford	16
2001	ACC	6	3	2	1	4th	SF	21	13	6	2		NCAA 1st Round	Jeremiah White	37	Jeremiah White	15
2002	ACC	6	4	0	2	1st	SF	21	15	2	4		ACC Regular Season Champion, NCAA 3rd Round	Jeremiah White	27	Jeremiah White	11
2003	ACC	6	4	0	2	2nd	SF	21	16	0	5		NCAA 2nd Round	Scott Sealy	26	Scott Sealy	11
2004	ACC	7	5	0	2	1st	SF	21	14	5	2		ACC Regular Season Champion, NCAA 3rd Round	Scott Sealy	44	Scott Sealy	17
2005	ACC	8	1	5	2	8th	QF	23	13	8	2	12	NCAA 3rd Round	Justin Moose	23	Mark Ellington	8
2006	ACC	8	5	2	1	T-1st	F	25	18	3	4	3	ACC Regular Season Co-Champion, NCAA Semifinalist	Steven Curfman	20	Wells Thompson	7
2007	ACC	8	6	1	1	2nd	F	26	22	2	2	1	NCAA Champions	Cody Arnoux	38	Cody Arnoux	15
2008	ACC	8	7	0	1	T-1st	SF	25	22	2	1	2	ACC Regular Season Champion, NCAA Semifinalist	Cody Arnoux	42	Cody Arnoux	17
2009	ACC	8	5	2	1	T-1st	SF	24	17	4	3	3	ACC Regular Season Co-Champion, NCAA Semifinalist	Zack Schilawski	35	Zack Schilawski	14
2010	ACC	8	4	3	1	3rd	QF	19	8	9	2			Andy Lubahn	16	Andy Lubahn	8
2011	ACC	8	4	3	1	T-3rd	QF	21	8	8	5		NCAA 2nd Round	Andy Lubahn	14	Luca Gimenez	6
2012	ACC	8	4	1	3	3rd	QF	20	11	4	5	22	NCAA 2nd Round	Sean Okoli	25	Sean Okoli	11
2013	ACC	11	6	1	4	3rd	QF	21	10	6	5		NCAA 3rd Round	Luca Gimenez/Sean Okoli	21	Sean Okoli	9
2014	ACC	8	5	3	0	5th	QF	19	10	7	2		NCAA 1st Round	Michael Gamble	22	3 tied	6
2015	ACC	8	6	0	2	1st	SF	22	17	3	2	1	ACC Regular Season Champion, NCAA Quarterfinalist	Jack Harrison	27	Jack Harrison, Jon Bakero	8
2016	ACC	8	5	1	2	2nd	W	25	19	2	4	2	ACC Tournament Champion, NCAA Runner-up	Jacori Hayes	19	Jacori Hayes	8
2017	ACC	8	7	0	1	1st	W	2	1			5	ACC Regular Season Champion, ACC Tournament Champion, NCAA Quarterfinalist	Jon Bakero	46	Jon Bakero	16
2018	ACC	8	7	1	0	1st	SF	21	18	3	0	6	ACC Regular Season Champion, NCAA Third Round	Omir Fernandez	30	Omir Fernandez	12
2019	ACC	8	6	2	0	2nd	SF	23	16	5	2		NCAA Semifinalist	Bruno Lapa	23	Bruno Lapa	10
2020	ACC	6	8	1	2	1st South; 3rd Atlantic	QF	9	13	3	2		NCAA Quarterfinalist	Kyle Holcomb	20	Kyle Holcomb	9
2021	ACC	8	4	3	1	3rd Atlantic	QF	21	13	7	1	17	NCAA Third Round	Kyle Holcomb	28	Kyle Holcomb	12
2022	ACC	8	5	3	0	2nd Atlantic	QF	20	14	6	0	24	NCAA First Round	Roald Mitchell	18	Roald Mitchell	7
2023	ACC	8	4	1	3	1st Atlantic	QF	19	11	3	5	15	NCAA Second Round	Roald Mitchell	21	Roald Mitchell	9
2024	ACC	8	4	2	2	T-4th	W	24	12	5	7	6	NCAA Quarterfinalist	Cooper Flax	19	Cooper Flax	9
Totals: 42 Seasons	1 Conference	308	149	114	45	8 ACC titles	4 ACCT title	930	554	266	109		1 NCAA Title	Mark Erwin	160	Mark Erwin	68

== Awards ==
M.A.C. Hermann Trophy Winner:

- Marcus Tracy – 2008
- Ian Harkes – 2016
- Jon Bakero – 2017

ACC Coach of the Year:

- George Kennedy – 1981
- Jay Vidovich – 2002, 2004, 2006, 2008, 2009
- Bobby Muuss – 2015, 2016, 2017, 2018

ACC Offensive Player of the Year:

- Jeremiah White – 2003
- Scott Sealy – 2004
- Corben Bone – 2009
- Jack Harrison – 2015
- Ian Harkes – 2016
- Jon Bakero – 2017
- Omir Fernandez – 2018

ACC Midfielder of the Year:

- Bruno Lapa – 2018

ACC Defensive Player of the Year:

- Michael Parkhurst – 2004
- Ike Opara – 2008, 2009
- Kevin Politz – 2017
- Garrison Tubbs – 2023

ACC Freshman of the Year:

- Justin Moose – 2002
- Corben Bone – 2007
- Jack Harrison – 2015

== All-Americans ==
Year	Player(s)
1988	Neil Covone, Todd Renner
1989	Neil Covone, Todd Renner
1995	Serge Daniv
1996	Serge Daniv, Josh Timbers
1999	Chad Evans
2001	Aaron Thomas, Jeremiah White
2002	Brian Carroll, William Hesmer
2003	William Hesmer, Michael Parkhurst, Jeremiah White
2004	Justin Moose, Michael Parkhurst, Scott Sealy
2005	Justin Moose, Ryan Solle
2006	Julian Valentin
2007	Cody Arnoux, Sam Cronin, Pat Phelan
2008	Cody Arnoux, Corben Bone, Sam Cronin, Ike Opara, Marcus Tracy
2009	Corben Bone, Ike Opara, Zack Schilawski
2015	Jack Harrison
2016	Ian Harkes, Alec Ferrell, Jacori Hayes

== All-ACC Players ==
- The players are all first team All-ACC, unless otherwise noted

Year	Player(s)
1980	Greg Heileman*
1982	Jeff McNeill*
1983	Mark Erwin*
1988	Zen Luzniak*, Todd Renner*, John Stark*
1989	Craig Congor*, Neil Covone*, Fleming Peterson*, Todd Renner
1990	Craig Congor, Raimo de Vries*
1991	Jelle Abma*, Craig Congor, Raimo de Vries, John Duguid, Thomas Finlay*
1992	Jelle Abma*, Raimo deVries, Thomas Finlay*, Mike McGinty*
1995	Serge Daniv*, Josh Timbers*
1996	Serge Daniv, Ihor Dotsenko*, Josh Timbers
1997	Chad Evans*
1998	Kyle Bachmeier*, Serge Daniv, Chad Evans
1999	Sean Conner*, Chad Evans, David Kawesi-Mukooza*, Jamal Seale*
2000	Ben Stafford, Aaron Thomas*
2001	Brian Carroll*, William Hesmer*, Aaron Thomas, Jeremiah White
2002	Brian Carroll, William Hesmer, Justin Moose*, Michael Parkhurst*, Jeremiah White
2003	Vicente Bastidas*, William Hesmer, Amir Lowery*, Justin Moose*, Michael Parkhurst, Scott Sealy*, Jeremiah White
2004	Amir Lowery*, Justin Moose*, Michael Parkhurst, Scott Sealy
2005	Justin Moose, Ryan Solle*
2006	Brian Edwards*, Ryan Solle, Julian Valentin
2007	Cody Arnoux, Sam Cronin, Brian Edwards, Pat Phelan, Marcus Tracy*
2008	Cody Arnoux, Corben Bone, Sam Cronin, Michael Lahoud*, Ike Opara, Marcus Tracy
2009	Corben Bone, Austin da Luz, Ike Opara, Zack Schilawski
2010	Anthony Arena*, Akira Fitzgerald*, Andy Lubahn*
2011	Jared Watts
2012	Luca Gimenez*. Sean Okoli*, Jared Watts
2013	Luca Gimenez. Sean Okoli, Jalen Robinson*, Jared Watts
2014	Ian Harkes*, Michael Gamble
2014	Jack Harrison
2015	Alec Ferrell*, Michael Gamble*, Ian Harkes, Jack Harrison, Jacori Hayes
2016	Alec Ferrell, Ian Harkes, Jacori Hayes
2017	Jon Bakero, Ema Twumasi, Kevin Politz*
2018	Omir Fernandez, Bruno Lapa, Brad Dunwell*
2019	Bruno Lapa
2020	Calvin Harris, Isaiah Parente, Nico Benalcazar*, Machop Chol*
2021	Kyle Holcomb
2022	Garrison Tubbs*, Roald Mitchell*
2023	Garrison Tubbs, Trace Alphin*, Jahlane Forbes*, Hosei Kijima*, Roald Mitchell*
2024	Trace Alphin*, Cooper Flax*

- (*) Denotes 2nd Team All-ACC

== Players in the MLS SuperDraft ==
Year	Player	Round #	Pick #	Overall #	Team
2001	Ben Stafford	3rd	11	35	Kansas City Wizards
2003	Brian Carroll	2nd	1	11	D.C. United
2004	Will Hesmer	2nd	7	17	Kansas City Wizards
2004	Jeremiah White	3rd	3	23	New England Revolution
2005	Michael Parkhurst	1st	9	9	New England Revolution
2005	Scott Sealy	1st	11	11	Kansas City Wizards
2005	James Riley	2nd	9	21	New England Revolution
2005	Amir Lowery	4th	9	45	Colorado Rapids
2006	Justin Moose	1st	7	7	D.C. United
2007	Wells Thompson	1st	5	5	New England Revolution
2007	Ryan Solle	2nd	12	25	New England Revolution
2007	Steven Curfman	3rd	4	30	Real Salt Lake
2008	Pat Phelan	1st	10	10	Toronto FC
2008	Brian Edwards	2nd	14	28	Toronto FC
2008	Julian Valentin	3rd	1	29	Los Angeles Galaxy
2009	Sam Cronin	1st	2	2	Toronto FC
2009	Michael Lahoud	1st	9	9	Chivas USA
2009	Evan Brown	2nd	1	16	Seattle Sounders FC
2009	Lyle Adams	2nd	11	26	D.C. United
2009	Jamie Franks	4th	4	49	Chivas USA
2009	Marcus Tracy	4th	11	56	Houston Dynamo
2010	Ike Opara	1st	3	3	San Jose Earthquakes
2010	Zack Schilawski	1st	9	9	New England Revolution
2010	Corben Bone	1st	13	13	Chicago Fire
2010	Austin da Luz	1st	14	14	New York Red Bulls
2014	Chris Duvall	2nd	3	22	New York Red Bulls
2014	Jared Watts	2nd	14	33	Colorado Rapids
2014	Tolani Ibikunle	3rd	11	49	Colorado Rapids
2014	Luca Gimenez	4th	6	63	Philadelphia Union
2016	Jack Harrison	1st	1	1	New York City
2016	Michael Gamble	2nd	10	30	New England Revolution
2017	Jacori Hayes	1st	18	18	FC Dallas
2017	Alec Ferrell	2nd	1	23	Minnesota United FC
2018	Jon Bakero	1st	5	5	Chicago Fire
2018	Ema Twumasi	1st	11	11	FC Dallas
2018	Luis Argudo	3rd	21	67	Columbus Crew
2019	Logan Gdula	1st	13	13	FC Cincinnati
2019	Brad Dunwell	3rd	8	56	Houston Dynamo
2020	Alistair Johnston	1st	11	11	Nashville SC
2020	Joey DeZart	2nd	5	31	Orlando City SC
2021	Calvin Harris	1st	2	2	FC Cincinnati
2021	Michael DeShields	1st	5	5	D.C. United
2021	Justin McMaster	1st	17	17	Minnesota United FC
2021	Andrew Pannenberg	2nd	22	49	Orlando City SC
2022	Kyle Holcomb	2nd	1	29	Charlotte FC
2022	Holland Rula	Comp.	3	87	FC Dallas
2024	Hosei Kijima	1st	17	17	St. Louis City SC
2024	Jahlane Forbes	2nd	9	38	Charlotte FC
2024	Babacar Niang	3rd	20	78	Minnesota United FC
2025	Travis Smith Jr.	2nd	3	33	Chicago Fire FC
2025	Bo Cummins	2nd	18	48	Houston Dynamo FC
2025	Trace Alphin	2nd	29	59	Real Salt Lake
2025	Liam O'Gara	3rd	19	79	Real Salt Lake
2026	Harvey Sarajian	1st	5	5	Orlando City
2026	Tate Lorentz	3rd	3	63	CF Montréal

== See also ==
- 2012 Wake Forest Demon Deacons men's soccer team
