= 2007 NCAA Division I men's soccer tournament =

2007 NCAA Men's Division I Soccer Tournament
Division I Men's College Cup (semifinals & final)

Tournament details
- Country: United States
- Teams: 48

Final positions
- Champions: Wake Forest Demon Deacons
- Runners-up: Ohio State Buckeyes

Tournament statistics
- Matches played: 47
- Goals scored: 115 (2.45 per match)
- Top goal scorer: O'Brian White (4)

The 2007 NCAA Division I men's soccer tournament was a tournament of 48 teams from NCAA Division I who played for the NCAA Championship in soccer. The College Cup for the final four teams was held at SAS Soccer Park in Cary, North Carolina. All other games were played at the home field of the higher-seeded team. The final was held on December 16, 2007.

In the final, Wake Forest defeated Ohio State, 2–1, with second-half goals scored by Marcus Tracy and Zach Schilawski. This was Wake Forest's first NCAA title in men's soccer and eighth overall.

The tournament began on November 23, 2007. The first round was played on November 23 and 24, and the second round on the November 28. The third round was played on December 1 and 2. The Regional Finals were played on December 7 and 8.

== Regional 1 ==
First round
Boston U	1
UMass	2
Central Connecticut	3
Harvard	2
UIC	0(6)
Saint Louis	0(5)
Gonzaga	0
SMU	1

Second round
UMass	2
1	Boston College	1
16	Tulsa	2
Central Connecticut	3
UIC	2
9	Northwestern	0
8	Creighton	3
SMU	0

Regional semifinals
UMass	3
Central Connecticut	1
UIC	1
8	Creighton	0

Regional Finals
UMass	2
UIC	1

== Regional 2 ==
First round
Duke	0
Louisville	1
Portland	0
Washington	1
Liberty	0
Loyola (MD)	2
DePaul	0
Bradley	2

Second round
Louisville	0
5	Ohio State	1
12	UC Santa Barbara	1
Washington	0
Loyola (MD)	0(2)
13	Maryland	0(4)
4	Indiana	1(4)
Bradley	1(5)

Regional semifinals
5	Ohio State	4/2OT
12	UC Santa Barbara	3
13	Maryland	2
Bradley	3/2OT

Regional Finals
5	Ohio State	4
Bradley	0

== Regional 3 ==
First round
Vermont	1(4)
Dartmouth	1(3)
Colgate	1
South Florida	2
UC Davis	1
California	2/2OT
Providence	0
Old Dominion	1

Second round
Vermont	0
3	Connecticut	2
14	Akron	0
South Florida	1/2OT
California	2
11	Virginia Tech	3
6	Brown	1
Old Dominion	2/2OT

Regional semifinals
3	Connecticut	5
South Florida	0
11	Virginia Tech	1
Old Dominion	0

Regional Finals
3	Connecticut	0
11	Virginia Tech	1

== Regional 4 ==
First round
New Mexico	0
UCLA	1
Oakland	2
Michigan State	1
St. Peter's	1
Virginia	3
Campbell	0
Furman	2

Second round
UCLA	1
7	Santa Clara	3
10	Notre Dame	2
Oakland	1
Virginia	0
15	West Virginia	1
2	Wake Forest	1
Furman	0

Regional semifinals
7	Santa Clara	0
10	Notre Dame	2
15	West Virginia	1
2	Wake Forest	3

Regional Finals
10	Notre Dame	0
2	Wake Forest	1/OT

== College Cup – SAS Soccer Park, Cary, North Carolina ==
National semifinals December 14
Massachusetts	0
5	Ohio State	1
11	Virginia Tech	0
2	Wake Forest	2

National Championship; December 16
5	Ohio State	1
2	Wake Forest	2

== Results ==
=== First round ===
November 23, 2007	Massachusetts	2–1	Boston U	Amherst, Massachusetts
12:00 EST	Amick 24'; Jejna 67'	Report	Puerta 87'	Stadium: Rudd Field; Attendance: 484; Referee: Gus St. Silva

November 23, 2007	California	2–1 (a.e.t.)	UC Davis	Berkeley, California
4:30 EST	Jacobson 33'; Wiedeman 102'	Report	Amarikwa 75'	Stadium: Edwards Stadium; Attendance: 3,479; Referee: Colin Arblaster

November 23, 2007	Virginia	3–1	Saint Peter's	Charlottesville, Virginia
5:00 EST	LaBauex 51'; Murphy 78'; Tierney 84'	Report	Constantino 30'	Stadium: Klöckner Stadium; Attendance: 1,270; Referee: Ronnie Canales

November 23, 2007	Louisville	1–0	Duke	Louisville, Kentucky
7:00 EST	F. Jonke 28'	Report		Stadium: Cardinal Park; Attendance: 828; Referee: Jim Sparks

November 23, 2007	South Florida	2–1	Colgate	Tampa, Florida
7:30 EST	Devenish 19'; Y. Marshall 72'	Report	Volk 54'	Stadium: USF Soccer Stadium; Attendance: 928; Referee: Chris Kenney

November 23, 2007	Saint Louis	0–0 (a.e.t.) (5–6 p)	Illinois-Chicago	St. Louis, Missouri
8:00 EST		Report		Stadium: Hermann Stadium; Attendance: 1,193; Referee: Abdu Bensalah
	Penalties
	Patterson (penalty scored); Ream (penalty missed); Holmes (penalty missed); Barklage (penalty scored); Hayes (penalty scored); Grazier (penalty scored); Sweetin (penalty scored); Gasparovic (penalty missed)		(penalty scored) Bubonja; (penalty scored) B. Husidić; (penalty scored) Zambrano; (penalty missed) Trout; (penalty missed) Dundjer; (penalty scored) Giffin; (penalty scored) Bilbrey; (penalty scored) Spiess

November 23, 2007	Washington	1–0	Portland	Seattle
9:00 EST	Allen 86' (pen.)	Report		Stadium: Husky Soccer Stadium; Attendance: 1,125; Referee: Mark Matthews

November 24, 2007	Harvard	2–3	Central Connecticut State	Cambridge, Massachusetts
12:00 EST	Stamatis 37'; Akpan 77'	Report	Smith 22'; Cooper 53'; Klukowski 84'	Stadium: Ohiri Field; Attendance: 953; Referee: Lou Labbadia

November 24, 2007	Michigan State	1–2	Oakland	East Lansing, Michigan
12:00 EST	DeMartin 80'	Report	Nowak 39'; St. Louis 46'	Stadium: DeMartin Soccer Complex; Attendance: 896; Referee: Brent Sorg

November 24, 2007	Loyola (Maryland)	2–0	Liberty	Baltimore
1:00 EST	Dines 23'; Bannister 41'	Report		Stadium: Ridley Athletic Complex; Attendance: 902; Referee: Jorge González

November 24, 2007	Furman	2–0	Campbell	Greenville, South Carolina
1:00 EST	Davis 36'; Cekic 90'	Report		Stadium: Eugene E. Stone III Stadium; Attendance: 773; Referee: Mark Kadlecik

November 24, 2007	Dartmouth	1–1 (a.e.t.) (3–4 p)	Vermont	Hanover, New Hampshire
2:30 EST	Keat 1' (pen.)	Report	Tobin 90' (pen.)	Stadium: Burnham Field; Attendance: 2,034; Referee: Erich Simmons
	Penalties
	Henderson (penalty missed); Ordonez (penalty scored); Keat (penalty scored); Christman (penalty scored); Rothenberg (penalty missed)		(penalty scored) Crasilneck; (penalty scored) Hasman; (penalty scored) Hill; (penalty missed) Georgiadis; (penalty scored) Tobin

November 24, 2007	Old Dominion	1–0	Providence	Norfolk, Virginia
7:00 EST	Emmanuel 67'	Report		Stadium: Old Dominion Soccer Complex; Attendance: 703; Referee: Nate Clement

November 24, 2007	Bradley	2–0	DePaul	Peoria, Illinois
8:00 EST	Brust 61'; Bigelow 83'	Report		Stadium: Shea Stadium; Attendance: 1,129; Referee: Jorge Riopedre

November 24, 2007	SMU	1–0	Gonzaga	University Park, Texas
8:00 EST	Guarda 76' (pen.)	Report		Stadium: Westcott Field; Attendance: 232; Referee: Misail Tsapos

November 24, 2007	UCLA	1–0	New Mexico	Los Angeles
10:00 EST	Nakazawa 89'	Report		Stadium: Drake Stadium; Attendance: 625; Referee: Miguel Chicas

=== Second round ===
November 28, 2007	#13 Maryland	0–0 (a.e.t.) (4–2 p)	Loyola (Maryland)	College Park, Maryland
5:00 EST		Report		Stadium: Ludwig Field; Attendance: 1,874; Referee: Andrew Chapin
	Penalties
	Allen (penalty scored); Zusi (penalty missed); King (penalty scored); Gonzalez (penalty scored); Hall (penalty scored)		(penalty scored) McVea; (penalty scored) Darvill; (penalty missed) Correa; (penalty missed) Cantillo

November 28, 2007	#5 Ohio State	1–0	Louisville	Columbus, Ohio
5:00 EST	Magill 53'	Report		Stadium: Jesse Owens Memorial Stadium; Attendance: 870; Referee: Abdu Bensalah

November 28, 2007	#1 Boston College	1–2	Massachusetts	Chestnut Hill, Massachusetts
7:00 EST	Bedoya 18'	Report	Hogan 51'; Mi. DeSantis 85'	Stadium: Newton Soccer Complex; Attendance: 1,882; Referee: Erich Simmons

November 28, 2007	#6 Brown	1–2 (a.e.t.)	Old Dominion	Providence, Rhode Island
7:00 EST	Davies 49'	Report	Kulp 12'; Emmanuel 107'	Stadium: Stevenson Field; Attendance: 1,675; Referee: Gus St. Silva

November 28, 2007	#4 Indiana	1–1 (a.e.t.) (4–5 p)	Bradley	Bloomington, Indiana
7:00 EST	Mellencamp 2'	Report	Brust 69'	Stadium: Bill Armstrong Stadium; Attendance: 1,297; Referee: Hilario Grajeda
	Penalties
	Weaver (penalty scored); Adlard (penalty scored); Ackley (penalty scored); Alexander (penalty scored); Roach (penalty missed)		(penalty scored) Brust; (penalty scored) Donoho; (penalty scored) DeGurian; (penalty scored) Campbell; (penalty scored) Cutshaw

November 28, 2007	#16 Tulsa	2–3	Central Connecticut State	Tulsa, Oklahoma
7:00 EST	McInnes 21'; Goddard 86' (pen.)	Report	Klukowski 23'; Rundquist 48'; Smith 81'	Stadium: Hurricane Soccer & Track Stadium; Attendance: 851; Referee: Tim Debysingh

November 28, 2007	#3 Connecticut	2–0	Vermont	Storrs, Connecticut
7:00 EST	Arad 1'; White 56'	Report		Stadium: Morrone Stadium; Attendance: 2,631; Referee: Lou Labbadia

November 28, 2007	#11 Virginia Tech	3–2	California	Blacksburg, Virginia
7:00 EST	Nason 25'; Campbell 56', 85'	Report	Ayala-Hil 59', 90'	Stadium: Tech Soccer Stadium; Attendance: 1,597; Referee: Mark Kadlecik

November 28, 2007	#2 Wake Forest	1–0	Furman	Winston-Salem, North Carolina
7:00 EST	Valentin 23'	Report		Stadium: W. Dennie Spry Soccer Stadium; Attendance: 1,443; Referee: Steve Taylor

November 28, 2007	#15 West Virginia	1–0	Virginia	Morgantown, West Virginia
7:00 EST	Stratford 51'	Report		Stadium: Dick Dlesk Soccer Stadium; Attendance: 1,112; Referee: Mark Garcia

November 28, 2007	#14 Akron	0–1 (a.e.t.)	South Florida	Akron, Ohio
7:30 EST		Report	Y. Marshall 102'	Stadium: Lee R. Jackson Field; Attendance: 1,059; Referee: Tony DeLois

November 28, 2007	#10 Notre Dame	2–1	Oakland	Notre Dame, Indiana
7:30 EST	Yoshinaga 36'; Lapira 57'	Report	Osnes 66'	Stadium: Alumni Stadium; Attendance: 468; Referee: Rich Grady

November 28, 2007	#8 Creighton	3–0	SMU	Omaha, Nebraska
8:00 EST	Bohnenkamp 6'; Gotsmanov 37'; Travis 87'	Report		Stadium: Morrison Stadium; Attendance: 1,390; Referee: Hidajet Tica

November 28, 2007	#9 Northwestern	0–2	Illinois-Chicago	Evanston, Illinois
8:00 EST		Report	Stoll 72'; Sarachan 90'	Stadium: Lakeside Field; Attendance: 1,023; Referee: David Jaworski

November 28, 2007	#7 Santa Clara	3–1	UCLA	Santa Clara, California
10:00 EST	Hatzke 24'; McCarthy 79'; Ogunbiyi 80'	Report	Zaher 38'	Stadium: Buck Shaw Stadium; Attendance: 1,834; Referee: Dinesh Singh

November 28, 2007	#12 UC Santa Barbara	1–0	Washington	Santa Barbara, California
10:00 EST	J. Curry 10'	Report		Stadium: Harder Stadium; Attendance: 9,641; Referee: Alex Gorin

=== Third round ===
December 1, 2007	#13 Maryland	2–3 (a.e.t.)	Bradley	College Park, Maryland
6:00 EST	Wallace 17'; Gonzalez 28'	Report	DeGurian 88'; Cutshaw 90', 109'	Stadium: Ludwig Field; Attendance: 1,959; Referee: Nate Clement

December 1, 2007	#8 Creighton	0–1	Illinois-Chicago	Omaha, Nebraska
8:00 EST		Report	Sarachan 74'	Stadium: Morrison Stadium; Attendance: 1,210; Referee: Jorge Riopedre

December 1, 2007	#7 Santa Clara	0–2	#10 Notre Dame	Santa Clara, California
10:00 EST		Report	Lapira 68'; Donohue 71'	Stadium: Buck Shaw Stadium; Attendance: 2,487; Referee: Yader Reyes

December 2, 2007	#3 Connecticut	5–0	South Florida	Storrs, Connecticut
12:00 EST	White 2', 22', 60'; Priestley 47'; Chijindu 76'	Report		Stadium: Morrone Stadium; Attendance: 2,882; Referee: Erich Simmons

December 2, 2007	Massachusetts	3–1	Central Connecticut State	Amherst, Massachusetts
12:00 EST	Hogan 74', 80'; Ofosu 87'	Report	Klukowski 88'	Stadium: Rudd Field; Attendance: 1,197; Referee: Bahij Salman

December 2, 2007	#5 Ohio State	4–3 (a.e.t.)	#12 UC Santa Barbara	Columbus, Ohio
1:00 EST	Brunner 25', 70'; Edwards 66'; Magill 104'	Report	Motagalvan 5'; Brunner 32' (o.g.); Perera 53'	Stadium: Jesse Owens Memorial Stadium; Attendance: 643; Referee: Michael Oliver

December 2, 2007	#11 Virginia Tech	1–0	Old Dominion	Blacksburg, Virginia
1:00 EST	Nyarko 23'	Report		Stadium: Tech Soccer Stadium; Attendance: 1,365; Referee: Bill Dittmar

December 2, 2007	#2 Wake Forest	3–1	#15 West Virginia	Winston-Salem, North Carolina
1:00 EST	Schilawski 56'; Arnoux 65', 87'	Report	Wright 50' (pen.)	Stadium: W. Dennie Spry Soccer Stadium; Attendance: 1,614; Referee: Andrew Chapin

=== Quarterfinals ===
December 8, 2007	#3 Connecticut	0–1	#11 Virginia Tech	Storrs, Connecticut
1:00 EST		Report	Nyarko 22'	Stadium: Morrone Stadium; Attendance: 5,495; Referee: Brent Sorg

December 8, 2007	#2 Wake Forest	1–0 (a.e.t.)	#10 Notre Dame	Winston-Salem, North Carolina
7:00 EST	da Luz 97'	Report		Stadium: W. Dennie Spry Soccer Stadium; Attendance: 4,589; Referee: Rob Mann

December 9, 2007	Massachusetts	2–1	Illinois-Chicago	Amherst, Massachusetts
12:00 EST	Amick 48'; Mi. DeSantis 80'	Report	Giffin 59'	Stadium: Rudd Field; Attendance: 1,863; Referee: Ali Haycock

December 9, 2007	#5 Ohio State	4–0	Bradley	Columbus, Ohio
1:00 EST	Balc 58' (pen.), 65'; Marsh 63'; Magill 70'	Report		Stadium: Jesse Owens Memorial Stadium; Attendance: 1,705; Referee: Jorge de la Bandera

=== College Cup ===
==== Semifinals ====
December 14, 2007	#2 Wake Forest	2–0	#11 Virginia Tech	Cary, North Carolina
5:00 EST	Tracy 51', 83'	Report		Stadium: SAS Soccer Park; Attendance: 8,611; Referee: Alex Gorin

December 14, 2007	#5 Ohio State	1–0	Massachusetts	Cary, North Carolina
7:00 EST	Edwards 53'	Report		Stadium: SAS Soccer Park; Attendance: 8,611; Referee: Alex Prus

==== Championship ====
December 16, 2007	#2 Wake Forest	2–1	#5 Ohio State	Cary, North Carolina
3:00 EST	Tracy 66'; Schilawski 78'	Report	Espinoza 13'	Stadium: SAS Soccer Park; Attendance: 8,172; Referee: Misail Tsapos

== Statistics ==
=== Goalscorers ===
4 goals

- (Jamaica) O'Brian White — Connecticut

3 goals

- (England) Yan Klukowski — Central Connecticut State
- (United States) Bryan Hogan — Massachusetts
- (United States) Andrew Magill — Ohio State
- (United States) Marcus Tracy — Wake Forest

2 goals

- (United States) Stephen Brust — Bradley
- (United States) Chris Cutshaw — Bradley
- (United States) Javier Ayala-Hil — California
- (United States) Conor Smith — Central Connecticut State
- (United States) Ian Sarachan — Illinois-Chicago
- (United States) Stuart Amick — Massachusetts
- (United States) Mike DeSantis — Massachusetts
- (Republic of Ireland) Joseph Lapira — Notre Dame
- (United States) Xavier Balc — Ohio State
- (United States) Eric Brunner — Ohio State
- (United States) Eric Edwards — Ohio State
- (Cameroon) Ambane Emmanuel — Old Dominion
- (Trinidad and Tobago) Yohance Marshall — South Florida
- (United States) Charlie Campbell — Virginia Tech
- (Ghana) Patrick Nyarko — Virginia Tech
- (United States) Cody Arnoux — Wake Forest
- (United States) Zack Schilawski — Wake Forest

1 goal

- (United States) Alejandro Bedoya — Boston College
- (United States) Derek Puerta — Boston U
- (United States) Justin Bigelow — Bradley
- (United States) Drew DeGurian — Bradley
- (United States) Kevin Davies — Brown
- (United States) Andrew Jacobson — California
- (United States) Andrew Wiedeman — California
- (England) Andrew Cooper — Central Connecticut State
- (Sweden) Johan Rundquist — Central Connecticut State
- (United States) Glenn Volk — Colgate
- (Israel) Dori Arad — Connecticut
- (United States) Chukwudi Chijindu — Connecticut
- (Jamaica) Akeem Priestley — Connecticut
- (United States) Tim Bohnenkamp — Creighton
- (Belarus) Andrei Gotsmanov — Creighton
- (United States) Mo Travis — Creighton
- (New Zealand) Dan Keat — Dartmouth
- (Bosnia and Herzegovina) Haris Cekic — Furman
- (United States) Chris Davis — Furman
- (United States) Andre Akpan — Harvard
- (United States) John Stamatis — Harvard
- (United States) Mike Giffin — Illinois-Chicago
- (United States) Kevin Stoll — Illinois-Chicago
- (United States) John Mellencamp — Indiana
- (Canada) Frank Jonke — Louisville
- (England) Phil Bannister — Loyola (Maryland)
- (England) Eddie Dines — Loyola (Maryland)
- (United States) Omar Gonzalez — Maryland
- (Costa Rica) Rodney Wallace — Maryland
- (United States) Michael Jejna — Massachusetts
- (Ghana) Prince Ofosu — Massachusetts
- (United States) Doug DeMartin — Michigan State
- (United States) Dave Donohue — Notre Dame
- (United States) Alex Yoshinaga — Notre Dame
- (Poland) Piotr Nowak — Oakland
- (Norway) Endre Osnes — Oakland
- (Trinidad and Tobago) Stefan St. Louis — Oakland
- (Honduras) Roger Espinoza — Ohio State
- (United States) Geoff Marsh — Ohio State
- (United States) A. J. Kulp — Old Dominion
- (Angola) Braulio Constantino — Saint Peter's
- (United States) Matt Hatzke — Santa Clara
- (United States) Stephen McCarthy — Santa Clara
- (United States) Babajide Ogunbiyi — Santa Clara
- (Brazil) Bruno Guarda — SMU
- (Trinidad and Tobago) Jason Devenish — South Florida
- (United States) Todd Goddard — Tulsa
- (Scotland) Ashley McInnes — Tulsa
- (United States) Quincy Amarikwa — UC Davis
- (United States) Jon Curry — UC Santa Barbara
- (United States) Alfonso Motagalvan — UC Santa Barbara
- (United States) Nick Perera — UC Santa Barbara
- (United States) Kyle Nakazawa — UCLA
- (United States) Mike Zaher — UCLA
- (United States) Connor Tobin — Vermont
- (United States) Ross LaBauex — Virginia
- (United States) Dane Murphy — Virginia
- (United States) Chris Tierney — Virginia
- (United States) Joe Nason — Virginia Tech
- (United States) Austin da Luz — Wake Forest
- (United States) Julian Valentin — Wake Forest
- (United States) Ely Allen — Washington
- (England) Dan Stratford — West Virginia
- (England) Andrew Wright — West Virginia

Own goals

- (United States) Eric Brunner — Ohio State (playing against UC Santa Barbara)
