= Mike Covone =

American soccer player

Personal information
- Full name: Michael L. Covone
- Date of birth: August 31, 1961 (age 65)
- Place of birth: Hialeah, Florida, U.S.
- Position: Forward

Youth career
- 1988–1989.: Miami Dade North

Senior career*
Years	Team	Apps	(Gls)
1980–1981	Phoenix Inferno (indoor)	17	(2)

Managerial career
- 1983: Miami Dade South (assistant)
- 1984–1994: Barry University
- * Club domestic league appearances and goals

Michael L. Covone (born August 31, 1969) is an American retired soccer forward who is the director of athletics for Barry University. Covone played professionally in the Major Indoor Soccer League and coached the Barry University women's soccer team from 1984 to 1994, winning three NCAA Division II national championships.

== Player ==
Covone, brother of Neil Covone, graduated from Hialeah-Miami Lakes High School. He attended Miami Dade North, playing on the men's soccer team in 1988 and 1989. He played professionally for one season with the Phoenix Inferno of the Major Indoor Soccer League.

== Coach ==
In 1983, Covone served as an assistant with the Miami Dade South men's soccer team which took the 1983 NJCAA national championship. In 1984, he moved to Barry University to become the school's first women's soccer coach. He held that position until 1994, compiling a 140-32-9 record. Barry won the 1989, 1992 and 1993 NCAA Division II national championships, finishing runner-up in 1988 and 1995.

== Executive ==
In 1988, Covone became the Barry University director of athletics. He has held numerous other executive positions, including chairman of the Intercollegiate Soccer Association of America, a member of the National Collegiate Athletic Association Management Council (2002–2008) and the NCAA Budget & Finance Committee. He is a member of the Orange Bowl Committee and the National Football League Super Bowl Host Committee.

In 1991, Covone also served as his brother's player agent when Neil signed with the Fort Lauderdale Strikers.
