= Richard Jata =

American soccer player (born 1985)

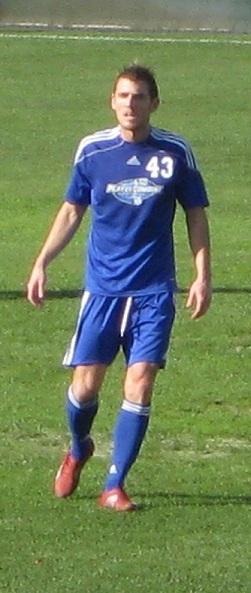

Personal information
- Date of birth: September 21, 1985 (age 41)
- Place of birth: Dunedin, Florida, United States
- Height: 5 ft 11 in (1.80 m)
- Position: Midfielder

Youth career
- 2001: IMG Academy

College career
Years	Team	Apps	(Gls)
2004	Furman Paladins		
2005–2008	Campbell Fighting Camels		

Senior career*
Years	Team	Apps	(Gls)
2007–2008	Carolina Dynamo	13	(4)
2010	Carolina Dynamo	14	(2)
2011	Wilmington Hammerheads	16	(1)
Total		43	(6)
- * Club domestic league appearances and goals as of November 20, 2012

Richard Jata (born September 21, 1985, in Dunedin, Florida) is an American soccer player.

== Career ==
=== College and amateur ===
Jata began his college career at Furman University, where he led the team in points. After one season with Furman he transferred to Campbell University. During his time at Campbell, he was a three-time All-South region midfielder, had 12 game-winning goals, was a three-time All-Atlantic Sun Conference First Team selection (2006, 2007, 2008), and amassed 71 points (28 goals, 15 assists) in 3 seasons. In Jata's senior year at Campbell he led the team to a 14–6 record, including an undefeated record in A-Sun conference play. He also achieved numerous individual awards, including being named the 2008 Athlete of the Year, the 2008 Atlantic Sun Conference Player of the Year, a 2008 NSCAA All-American Second Team selection, and a 3-time NCCSIA All-State team selection from 2006 to 2008. He finished his college career with 32 goals and 18 assists.

During his college career, Jata played with USL Premier Development League club Carolina Dynamo during their 2007 and 2008 seasons.

=== Professional ===
Jata was drafted in the fourth round (58th overall) of the 2009 MLS SuperDraft by Chicago Fire, but failed to make their final roster and was released by the club during their pre-season. He then proceeded to trial with numerous clubs in the US and Europe, but failed to sign with any of them. Jata eventually returned to USL PDL club Carolina Dynamo to play for them during their 2010 season.

Due to his perceived funny and touching speech at the 2009 MLS SuperDraft, Jata's journey in trying to secure a pro contract were followed and blogged about heavily on the internet, including one run by his brother for Campbell University.

Jata signed his first professional contract in February 2011, joining USL Pro club Wilmington Hammerheads. He made his professional debut on April 17, 2011, in Wilmington's first game of the 2011 season, a 1–0 win over the Rochester Rhinos. Jata left Wilmington at the end of the 2011 season for personal reasons.
