= Brian Edwards (soccer) =

American soccer player

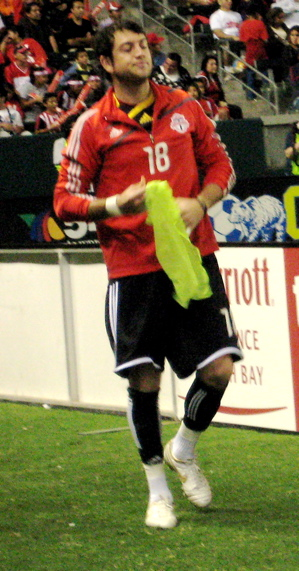
- Edwards in 2009

Personal information
- Full name: Brian Edwards
- Date of birth: October 6, 1984 (age 42)
- Place of birth: Summit, New Jersey, United States
- Height: 6 ft 3 in (1.91 m)
- Position: Goalkeeper

Team information
- Current team: Charlotte FC (goalkeeping coach)

College career
Years	Team	Apps	(Gls)
2003–2007	Wake Forest Demon Deacons		

Senior career*
Years	Team	Apps	(Gls)
2004–2005	Carolina Dynamo	23	(0)
2008–2010	Toronto FC	9	(0)
2010	Charlotte Eagles	2	(0)
2010	San Jose Earthquakes	0	(0)
2011–2012	Degerfors IF	56	(0)
Total		90	(0)

Managerial career
- 2022–: Charlotte FC (goalkeeping coach)
- * Club domestic league appearances and goals as of January 8, 2017

Brian Edwards (born October 6, 1984) is an American former soccer player who last played as a goalkeeper for Degerfors IF.

== Career ==
=== Youth and college ===
Edwards attended Providence High School in Charlotte, North Carolina, played club soccer for the Charlotte Soccer Club, and played college soccer at Wake Forest University. In his four-year playing career at Wake Forest, Edwards put up a career 0.78 GA average, 44 career shutouts, and led the Demon Deacons to victory in the 2007 Division I Men's College Cup, defeating Ohio State University in the final. Edwards was named the Final Four's defensive MVP. During his college years he also played with Carolina Dynamo of the USL Premier Development League.

=== Professional ===
Edwards was drafted in the second round (twenty-eighth overall) of the 2008 MLS SuperDraft by Toronto FC, which intended to use Edwards as a back-up goalkeeper behind Greg Sutton. He made his MLS debut on March 29, 2008, in a 2–0 defeat to Columbus Crew. On March 25, 2010 Toronto FC released the American goalkeeper by mutual consent, the 25-year-old became a free agent. After a trial at Seattle Sounders FC in April 2010, he signed with the Charlotte Eagles of the USL Second Division.

In September 2010 he signed with the San Jose Earthquakes of Major League Soccer for the remainder of the season. Being after the roster freeze date he was activated only on game days and served as the backup for Jon Busch. He was waived by San Jose on March 1, 2011.

As of March 2011 Edwards is playing for Degerfors IF in the Swedish Second Division. During his first season at the club he had the fourth highest save percentage in the league. He is now retired and is an assistant coach at UNC Charlotte. Prior to joining the Charlotte coaching staff, Edwards was an assistant coach at Hofstra University. In 2015, Edwards helped coach Hofstra soccer to the 2015 CAA championship and the second round of the NCAA tournament.

Edwards announced his retirement on March 2, 2013.

== Honors ==
Toronto FC

- Canadian Championship: 2009

Wake Forest University

- NCAA Men's Division I Soccer Championship: 2007
