= 2009 MLS SuperDraft =

College draft for soccer teams

General information
- Sport: Soccer
- Date: January 15, 2009
- Time: 1:00pm (CT)
- Location: St. Louis, Missouri
- Network: ESPN2

Overview
- 60 total selections
- First selection: Steve Zakuani, Seattle Sounders FC
- Most selections: New England Revolution (7 selections)
- Fewest selections: Houston Dynamo (2 selections)

The 2009 MLS SuperDraft took place on January 15, 2009, in St. Louis, Missouri. It was the tenth annual Major League Soccer SuperDraft. The first selection was owned by the expansion Seattle Sounders FC. Unlike previous years, the SuperDraft was not followed by the Supplemental Draft due to roster changes for the 2009 season decreasing the number of developmental spaces.

== Player selection ==
Key

*	Denotes a player contracted under the Generation Adidas program
^	Denotes player who has been selected to an MLS All-Star Game
§	Denotes a player who won the MLS Rookie of the Year
†	Denotes player who has been selected for an MLS Best XI team
~	Denotes a player who won the MLS MVP

=== Round one ===
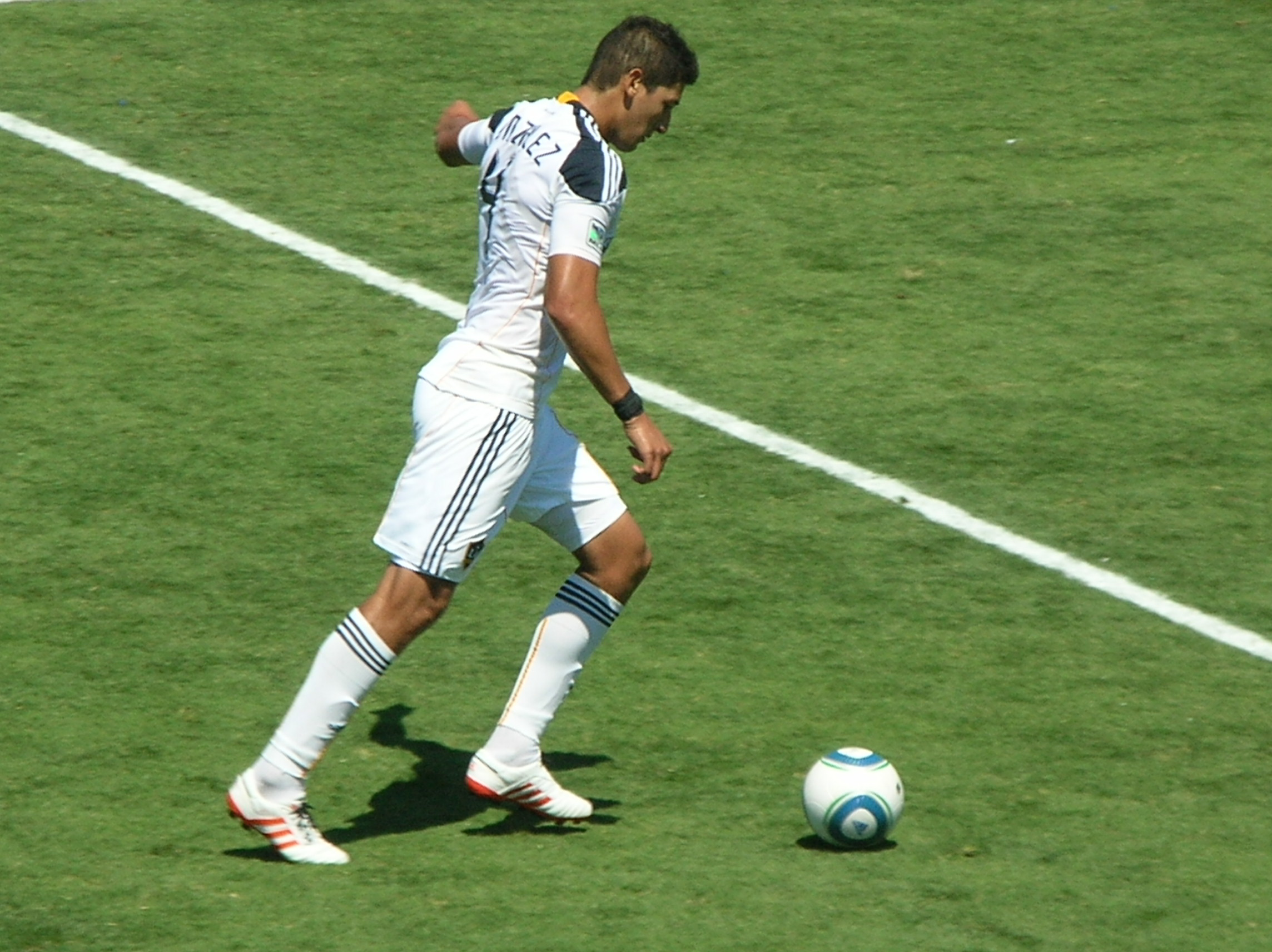
LA Galaxy selected Omar Gonzalez 3rd overall. The 2011 MLS Defender of the Year is as 4x MLS Best XI selection. Gonzalez has earned 52 caps with the U.S. national team and was selected to the 2014 FIFA World Cup squad.

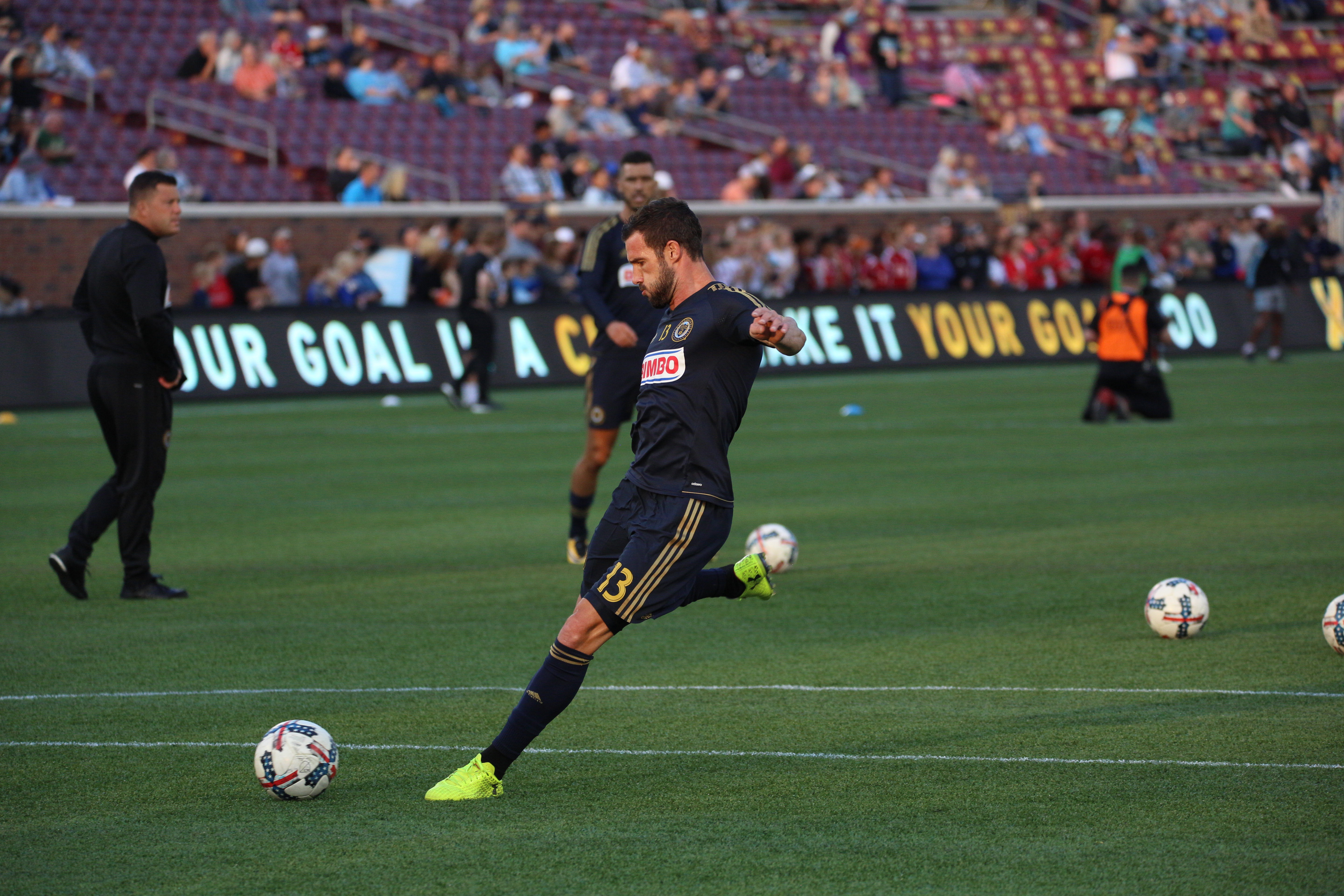
D.C. United selected Chris Pontius 7th overall. In 2012, he was named an MLS All-Star and selected to the MLS Best XI.

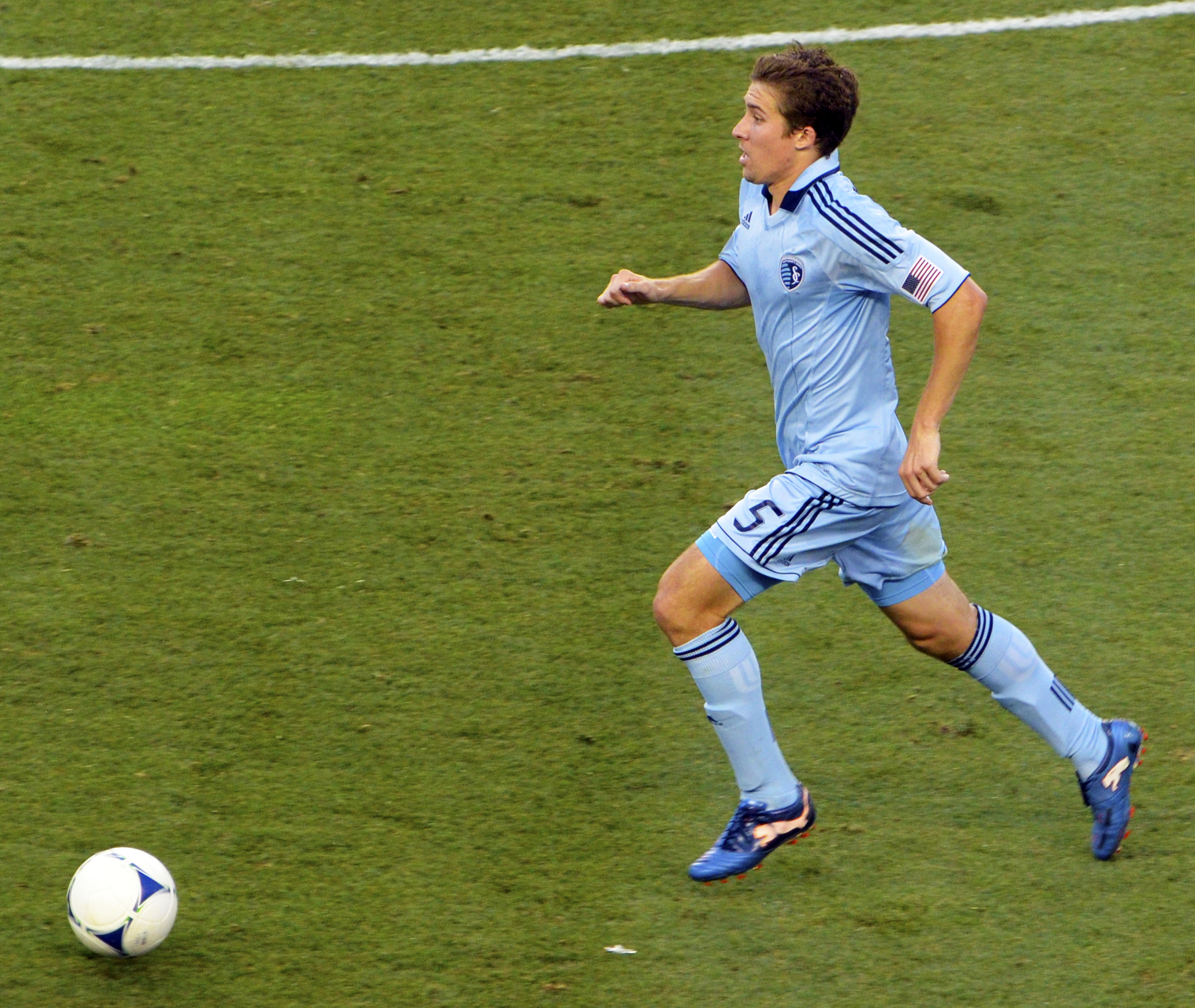
The Kansas City Wizards selected Matt Besler 8th overall. The 4x MLS All-Star, is a 2x MLS Best XI selection and was named the 2012 MLS Defender of the Year. Besler has earned 47 caps with the U.S. national team and was named to the 2014 FIFA World Cup squad.

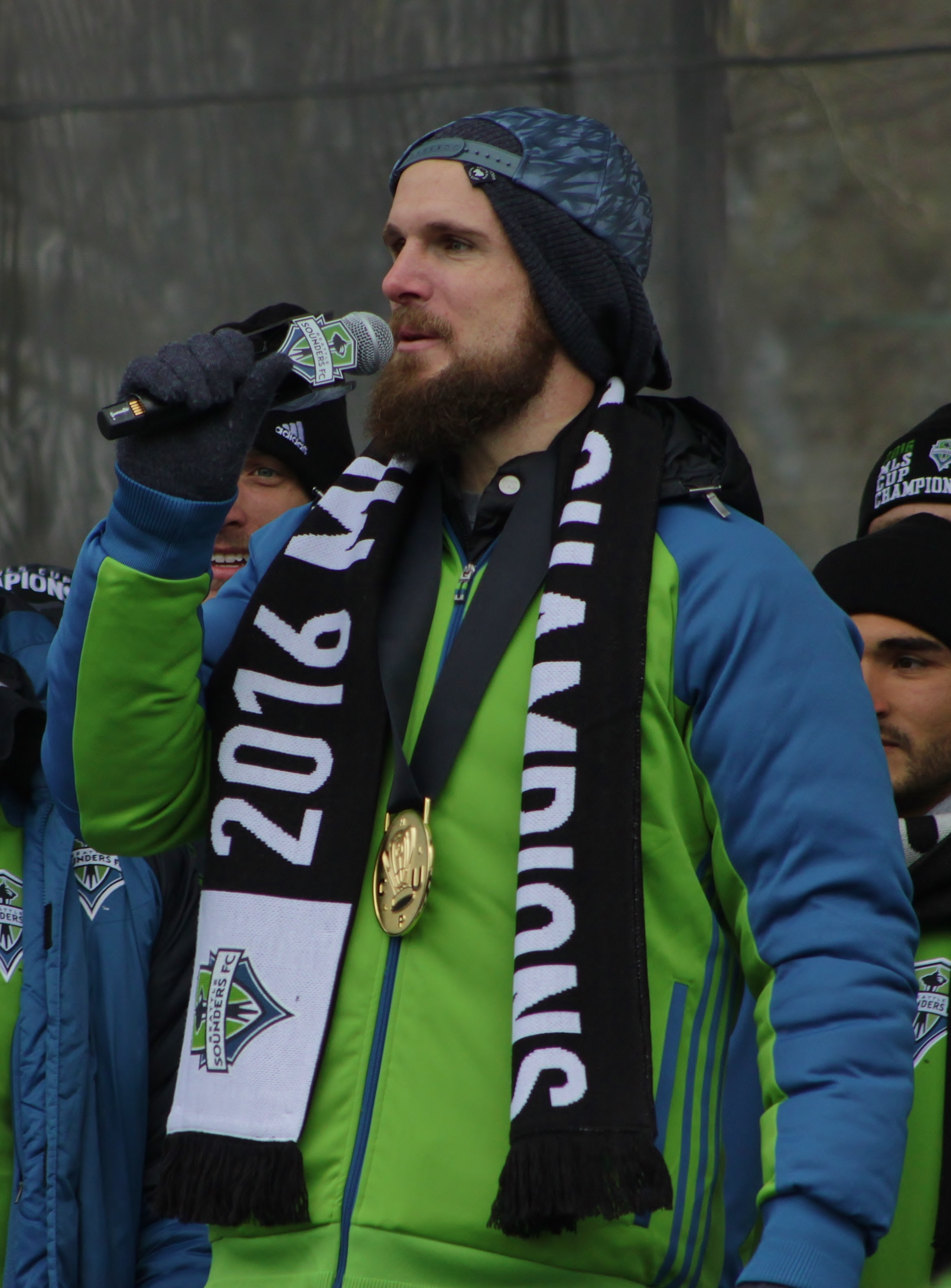
Toronto FC selected Stefan Frei 13th overall. The 2017 MLS All-Star is a 2x MLS Cup champion.

Pick #	MLS Team	Player	Position	Affiliation
1	Seattle Sounders FC	(Democratic Republic of the Congo) Steve Zakuani*	F	University of Akron; Cleveland Internationals
2	Toronto FC (Note: #2: San Jose Earthquakes → Toronto FC. 2008-02-28: Toronto received this pick and allocation money from San Jose in exchange for Ronnie O'Brien.)	(United States) Sam Cronin^	M	Wake Forest University; Carolina Dynamo
3	Los Angeles Galaxy	(United States) Omar Gonzalez*^§†	D	University of Maryland
4	Toronto FC	(Jamaica) O'Brian White	F	University of Connecticut
5	FC Dallas	(United States) Peri Marošević*	F	University of Michigan; Chicago Fire Premier
6	D.C. United	(Costa Rica) Rodney Wallace*^	D	University of Maryland
7	D.C. United (Note: #7: Colorado Rapids → D.C. United. 2008-02-08: D.C. United received this pick and Colorado's designated player spot for two years in exchange for Christian Gomez.)	(United States) Chris Pontius^†	F/M	UC Santa Barbara
8	Kansas City Wizards	(United States) Matt Besler^†	D	University of Notre Dame
9	Chivas USA	(Sierra Leone) Michael Lahoud	M	Wake Forest University; Carolina Dynamo
10	New England Revolution	(United States) Kevin Alston*^	D	Indiana University
11	New York Red Bulls (Note: #11: Houston Dynamo → San Jose Earthquakes → FC Dallas → New York Red Bulls. 2009-01-13: New York acquired this pick, a second-round selection (#18), and forward Dominic Oduro from FC Dallas in exchange for midfielder Dave van den Bergh and New York's natural first-round selection (pick #14). FC Dallas had acquired this pick and allocation money from San Jose in exchange for forward Arturo Alvarez on 2008-07-28. San Jose had acquired this pick and allocation money from Houston in exchange for forward Kei Kamara on 2008-07-24.)	(Puerto Rico) Jeremy Hall*	D/M	University of Maryland
12	Real Salt Lake	(Haiti) Jean Alexandre	M	Lynn University; Ventura County Fusion
13	Toronto FC (Note: #13: Chicago Fire → Toronto FC. 2008-07-31: Toronto FC acquired this pick and forward Chad Barrett from Chicago in exchange for the rights to forward Brian McBride.)	(Switzerland) Stefan Frei*^	G	University of California; San Jose Frogs
14	FC Dallas (Note: #14: New York Red Bulls → FC Dallas. 2009-01-13: FC Dallas acquired this pick and midfielder Dave van den Bergh from New York in exchange for Dallas' first-round selection (#11), a second-round selection (#18), and forward Dominic Oduro.)	(United States) George John	M/D	University of Washington
15	New England Revolution (Note: #15: Columbus Crew → New England Revolution. 2008-08-07: New England acquired this pick and allocation money from Columbus in exchange for forward Pat Noonan. As part of the trade the clubs also switched positions in the 2008 allocation table and agreed to considerations regarding the 2009 allocation rankings.)	(Jamaica) Ryan Maxwell	M	University of Tampa; Bradenton Academics

=== Round two ===
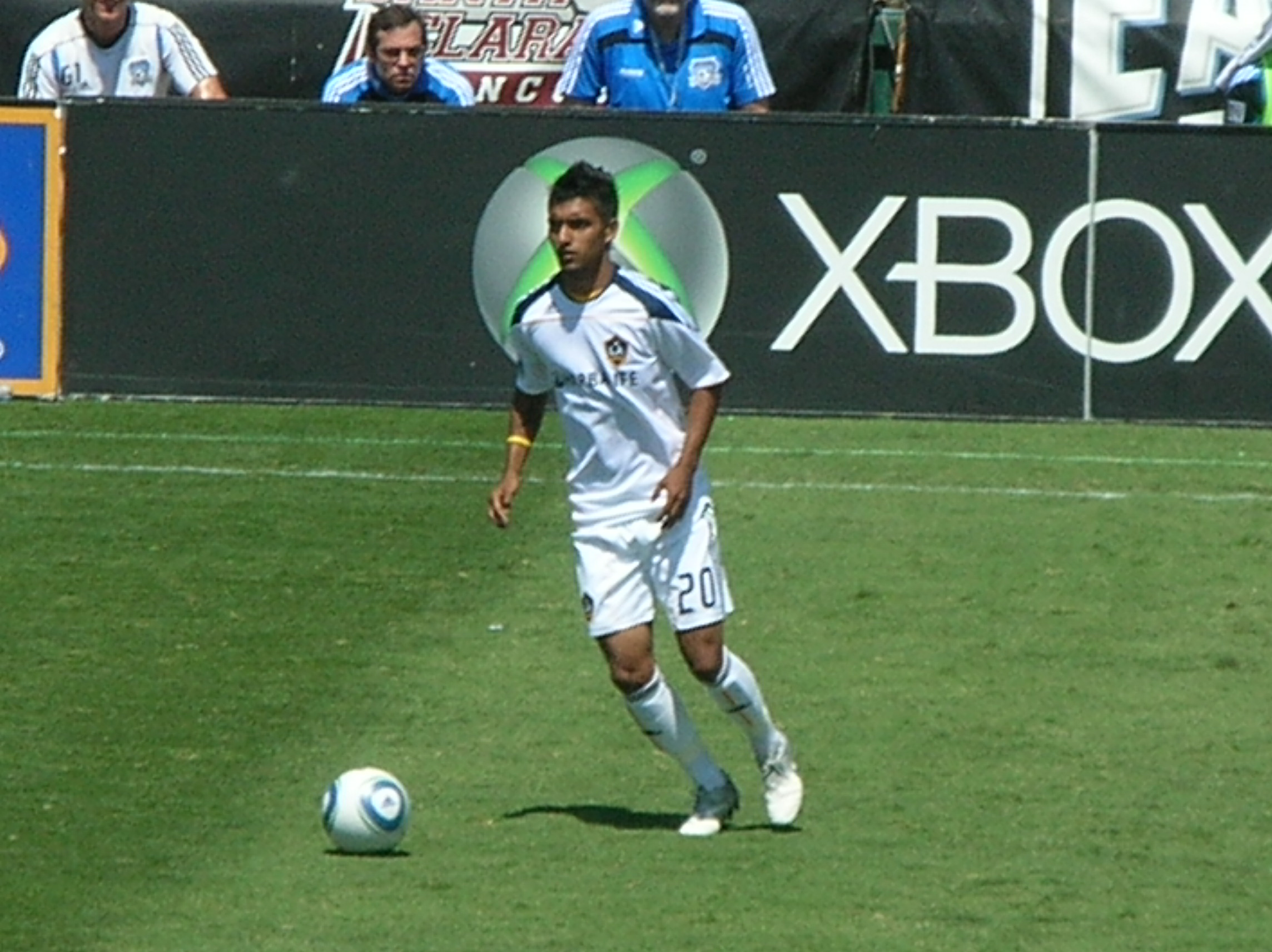
The LA Galaxy selected A.J. DeLaGarza 19th overall. The 3x MLS Cup winner was named the 2014 MLS Humanitarian of the Year.

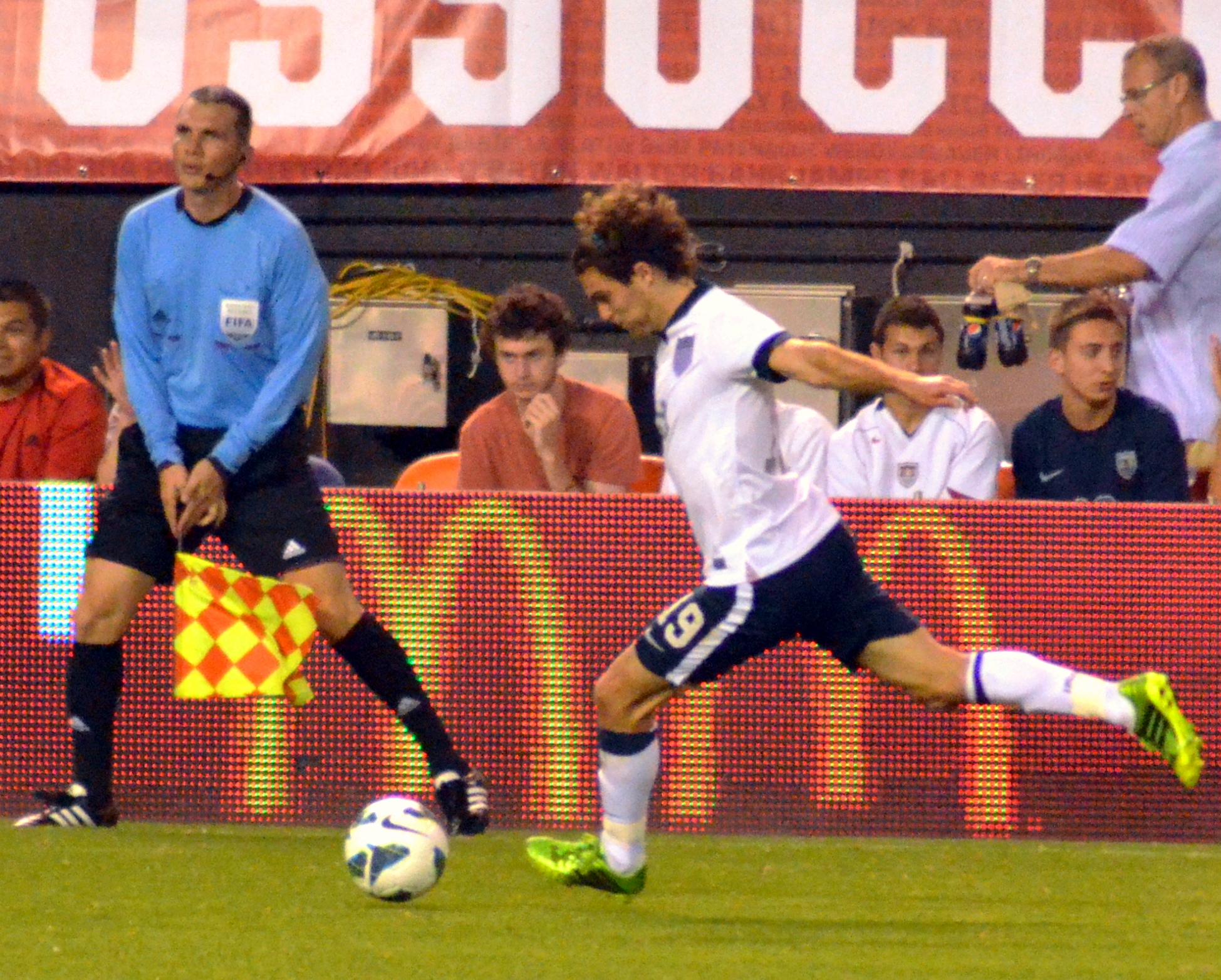
The Kansas City Wizards selected Graham Zusi 23rd overall. Zusi is a 7x MLS All-Star, 2 MLS Best XI selection and a 2013 MLS Cup winner. He's earned 55 caps with. the U.S. men's national team and was selected to the 2014 FIFA World Cup squad.

Pick #	MLS Team	Player	Position	Affiliation
16	Seattle Sounders FC	(United States) Evan Brown	D	Wake Forest University; Cary RailHawks U23's
17	San Jose Earthquakes	(United States) Brad Ring	M	Indiana University; Chicago Fire Premier
18	New York Red Bulls (Note: #18: Los Angeles Galaxy → FC Dallas → New York Red Bulls. 2009-01-13: New York acquired this pick, a first-round selection (#11), and forward Dominic Oduro from FC Dallas in exchange for midfielder Dave van den Bergh and New York's natural first-round selection (pick #14). FC Dallas had acquired this pick and allocation money from Los Angeles in exchange for forward Carlos Ruiz on 2008-01-15.)	(United States) Babajide Ogunbiyi	D	Santa Clara University
19	Los Angeles Galaxy (Note: #19: Toronto FC → Chivas USA → Los Angeles Galaxy. 2009-01-15: Los Angeles acquired this pick from Chivas USA in exchange for defender Ante Jazic, a 2009 third-round selection (#35), and a 2009 fourth-round selection (#49). Chivas USA had acquired this pick and a 2010 conditional SuperDraft pick from Toronto FC in exchange for the rights to Amado Guevara on 2008-04-09.)	(Guam) A. J. DeLaGarza	D	University of Maryland
20	Chicago Fire (Note: #20: FC Dallas → Colorado Rapids → Chicago Fire. 2009-01-15: Chicago acquired this pick and allocation money from Colorado in exchange for a 2009 second-round selection (#28) and the rights to goalkeeper Matt Pickens. Colorado had acquired this pick and a 2009 third-round pick (#35) from FC Dallas in exchange for midfielder Bruno Guarda on 2008-07-28.)	(Bosnia and Herzegovina) Baggio Husidić*	M	University of Illinois at Chicago
21	D.C. United	(Serbia) Miloš Kočić	G	Loyola College in Maryland
22	Kansas City Wizards (Note: #22: Colorado Rapids → Kansas City Wizards. 2008-01-16: Kansas City acquired this pick from Colorado in exchange for defender José Burciaga, Jr.)	(United States) Doug DeMartin	F	Michigan State University; Michigan Bucks
23	Kansas City Wizards	(United States) Graham Zusi^†	M	University of Maryland; Central Florida Kraze
24	New England Revolution (Note: #24: Chivas USA → Los Angeles Galaxy → New England Revolution. 2008-04-18: New England acquired this pick from Los Angeles in exchange for defender Joe Franchino. Los Angeles had acquired this pick from Chivas USA in exchange for defender Shavar Thomas on 2007-05-03.)	(Belarus) Andrei Gotsmanov	M	Creighton University
25	New England Revolution	(Bosnia and Herzegovina) Dado Hamzagić	M	Saint Louis University; Chicago Fire Premier
26	D.C. United (Note: #26: Houston Dynamo → D.C. United. 2007-12-12: D.C. United acquired this pick and goalkeeper Zach Wells from Houston in exchange for defender Bobby Boswell.)	(Jamaica) Lyle Adams	D	Wake Forest University; Central Florida Kraze
27	FC Dallas (Note: #27: Real Salt Lake → FC Dallas. 2007-06-06: FC Dallas acquired this pick after MLS determined that Real Salt Lake had tampered when it hired goalkeeper coach Jeff Cassar away from FC Dallas. The league also fined RSL $20,000.)	(United States) Brian Shriver	F	University of North Carolina; Cary RailHawks U23's
28	Colorado Rapids (Note: #28: Chicago Fire → Colorado Rapids. 2009-01-15: Colorado acquired this pick and the rights to goalkeeper Matt Pickens from Chicago in exchange for a 2009 second-round selection (#20) and allocation money.)	(England) Kwame Adjeman-Pamboe	F	George Mason University
29	New York Red Bulls	(United States) Jack Traynor	D	University of Notre Dame
30	Columbus Crew	(United States) Paul Gerstenberger	D	Boston College Blackwatch Soccer Club

=== Round three ===
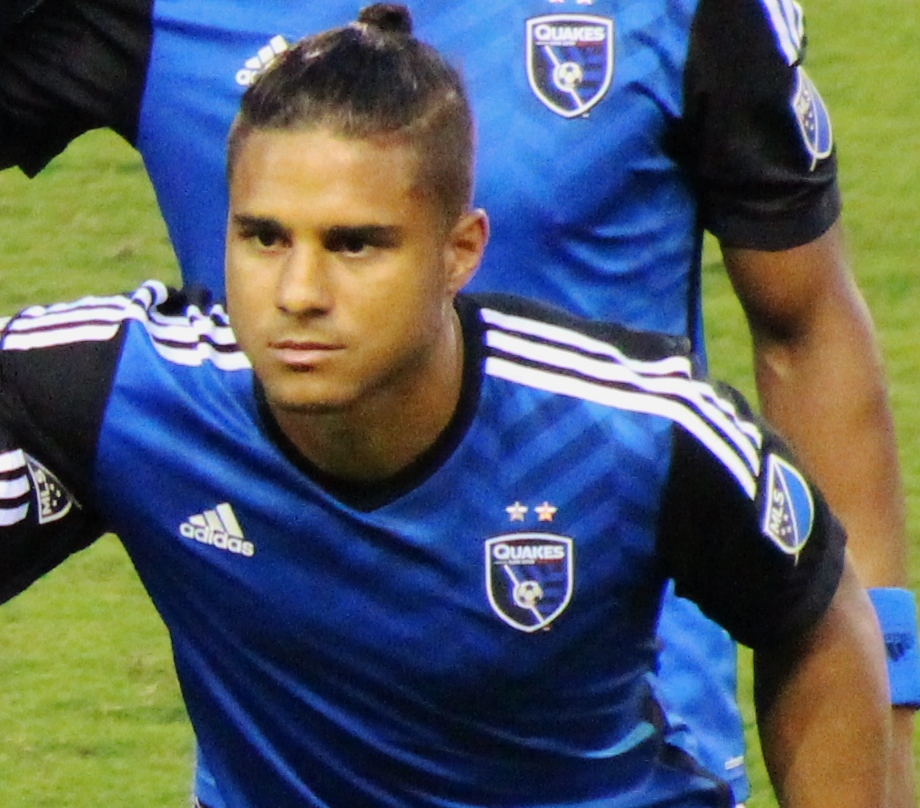
The San Jose Earthquakes selected Quincy Amarikwa 32nd overall. The 2010 MLS Cup winner played in over 200 MLS matches over his 11-year career.

Pick #	MLS Team	Player	Position	Affiliation
31	Seattle Sounders FC	(United States) Jared Karkas	D	Azusa Pacific University; Los Angeles Legends
32	San Jose Earthquakes	(United States) Quincy Amarikwa	F	UC Davis; Bakersfield Brigade
33	Los Angeles Galaxy	(Ghana) Joshua Boateng	F	Liberty University
34	Toronto FC	(United States) Mike Grella	F	Duke University; Cary RailHawks U23's
35	Chivas USA (Note: #35: FC Dallas → Colorado Rapids → Los Angeles Galaxy → Chivas USA. 2009-01-15: Chivas USA acquired this pick, a 2009 fourth-round selection (#49), and defender Ante Jazic from Los Angeles in exchange for a 2009 second-round selection (#19). Los Angeles had acquired this pick from Colorado in exchange for the rights to defender Ty Harden on 2009-01-13. Colorado had acquired this pick and a 2009 second-round pick (#20) from FC Dallas in exchange for midfielder Bruno Guarda on 2008-07-28.)	(United States) Kyle Christensen	F	University of Denver; Ogden Outlaws
36	D.C. United	(United States) Brandon Barklage	M	Saint Louis University; Chicago Fire Premier
37	Colorado Rapids	(Haiti) Steward Ceus	G	University of Albany
38	New England Revolution (Note: #38: Kansas City Wizards → New England Revolution. 2008-11-24: New England acquired this pick and allocation money from Kansas City in exchange for forward Adam Cristman.)	(United States) Chris Salvaggione	F	UNC Charlotte; Austin Aztex U23
39	Toronto FC (Note: #39: Chivas USA → FC Dallas → Toronto FC. 2008-08-08: Toronto FC acquired this pick from FC Dallas in exchange for forward Jeff Cunningham. FC Dallas had received this pick (originally a conditional pick) from Chivas USA in exchange for midfielder Ramon Nunez on 2007-08-15.)	(Canada) Kyle Hall	F	Syracuse University
40	New England Revolution	(United States) Darrius Barnes	D	Duke University; Cary RailHawks U23's
41	Houston Dynamo	(United States) Danny Cruz*	M/F	University of Nevada, Las Vegas; Des Moines Menace
42	Kansas City Wizards (Note: #42: Real Salt Lake → Kansas City Wizards. 2007-09-14: Kansas City acquired this pick, its natural 1st round pick in the 2009 MLS Supplemental Draft and a portion of a player allocation from Real Salt Lake in exchange for forward Yura Movsisyan and a Youth International roster spot.)	(United States) Neal Kitson	G	St. John's University; Newark Ironbound Express
43	Chicago Fire	(United States) David Sias	D	UC Irvine; Orange County Blue Star
44	New York Red Bulls	(United States) Nick Zimmerman	D/M	James Madison University
45	Columbus Crew	(United States) Alex Grendi	M	University of Pennsylvania

=== Round four ===
Pick #	MLS Team	Player	Position	Affiliation
46	Seattle Sounders FC	(United States) Mike Fucito	M	Harvard University
47	Colorado Rapids (Note: #47: San Jose Earthquakes → Colorado Rapids. 2008-05-21: Colorado acquired this pick and goalkeeper Preston Burpo from San Jose in exchange for forward Jovan Kirovski and defender Kelly Gray.)	(United States) Ross Schunk	F	University of Redlands; Los Angeles Legends
48	Los Angeles Galaxy	(England) Kyle Patterson	M	Saint Louis University; St. Louis Lions
49	Chivas USA (Note: #49: Toronto FC → Los Angeles Galaxy → Chivas USA. 2009-01-15: Chivas USA acquired this pick, a 2009 third-round selection (#35), and defender Ante Jazic from Los Angeles in exchange for a 2009 second-round selection (#19). Los Angeles had acquired this pick from Toronto FC in exchange for midfielder Kevin Harmse on 2008-02-29.)	(United States) Jamie Franks	M	Wake Forest University
50	Kansas City Wizards (Note: #50: FC Dallas → Kansas City Wizards. 2008-07-18: Kansas City acquired this pick from FC Dallas in exchange for use of an international roster spot for the balance of the 2008 MLS season.)	(Jamaica) Akeem Priestley	F	University of Connecticut
51	Colorado Rapids (Note: #51: DC United → Colorado Rapids. 2008-09-12: Colorado acquired this pick from DC United in exchange for an international roster spot.)	(United States) Jordan Seabrook	F	University of South Florida; Bradenton Academics
52	Chicago Fire (Note: #52: Colorado Rapids → Chicago Fire. 2007-08-15: Chicago acquired this pick from Colorado in exchange for defender Tony Sanneh.)	(Iceland) Jökull Elísabetarson	M	UNC-Greensboro; Carolina Dynamo
53	Colorado Rapids (Note: #53: Kansas City Wizards → Colorado Rapids. 2007-08-15: Colorado acquired this pick, a first-round selection in the 2009 supplemental draft, and allocation money from Kansas City in exchange for forward Herculez Gomez.)	(Uganda) Henry Kalungi	D	Winthrop University; Fredericksburg Gunners
54	Real Salt Lake (Note: #54: Chivas USA → Real Salt Lake. 2007-12-20: It is believed Real Salt Lake acquired this pick from Chivas USA in exchange for forward Atiba Harris. RSL also received a 2008 third-round selection from Chivas USA in the trade.)	(United States) Raphael Cox	M	University of Washington; Tacoma Tide
55	New England Revolution	(United States) Tyrel Lacey	G	University of Tulsa
56	Houston Dynamo	(United States) Marcus Tracy	F	Wake Forest University; Carolina Dynamo
57	Real Salt Lake	(Eswatini) Mfana Futhi Bhembe	F	Alabama A&M University
58	Chicago Fire	(United States) Richard Jata	M	Campbell University; Carolina Dynamo
59	Colorado Rapids (Note: #59: New York Red Bulls → Colorado Rapids. 2007-03-30: Colorado acquired this pick (originally a conditional pick) and a 2008 fourth-round selection from New York in exchange for forward Clint Mathis.)	(United States) Michael Holody	D	University of Michigan; Michigan Bucks
60	Columbus Crew	(United States) Chris Clements	D	University of Tulsa

== 2009 SuperDraft Trade Note ==
- Real Salt Lake acquired midfielder Will Johnson from Chicago Fire in a trade on 2008-08-22. In return, Chicago was to receive a natural fourth-round 2009 selection and a second-round 2011 MLS SuperDraft selection from RSL. However, the trade also contained a clause that allowed Chicago to receive allocation money in lieu of the draft picks. Chicago chose the allocation money.

== 2009 Supplemental Draft Trades ==
In December 2008 the league decided to cancel the Supplemental Draft, which had typically been held shortly after the annual SuperDraft. Prior to the cancellation a number of trades were made involving 2009 Supplemental Draft picks. It is unknown what compensation, if any, clubs which acquired 2009 Supplemental Draft picks in trades received in lieu of the draft picks. Announced trades involving 2009 Supplemental Draft selections include:

- Round 1, Kansas City Wizards → Colorado Rapids. 2007-08-15: Colorado Rapids acquired a first-round selection in the 2009 Supplemental Draft, a fourth-round pick (#53) in the 2009 SuperDraft, and allocation money from Kansas City Wizards in exchange for forward Herculez Gomez.
- Round 1, Real Salt Lake → Kansas City Wizards. 2007-09-14: Kansas City Wizards acquired a first-round selection in the 2009 Supplemental Draft, a third-round pick (#42) in the 2009 SuperDraft, and a portion of a player allocation from Real Salt Lake in exchange for forward Yura Movsisyan and a Youth International roster spot.
- Round 1, D.C. United → Toronto FC. 2008-04-03: Toronto FC acquired a first-round selection in the 2009 Supplemental Draft from D.C. United in exchange for defender Mike Zaher.
- Round 1, FC Dallas → Columbus Crew. 2008-07-18: Columbus Crew acquired a first-round selection in the 2009 Supplemental Draft from FC Dallas in exchange for use of an international roster spot for the remainder of the 2008 season.
- Round 1, Toronto FC → Los Angeles Galaxy. 2008-08-21: Los Angeles Galaxy acquired first-round and second-round selections in the 2009 Supplemental Draft and salary budget considerations from Toronto FC in exchange for forward Carlos Ruiz.
- Round 2, Real Salt Lake → Colorado Rapids. 2007-07-13: Colorado Rapids acquired a second-round selection in the 2009 Supplemental Draft and a first-round pick in the 2008 MLS Supplemental Draft from Real Salt Lake in exchange for defender Chris Wingert.
- Round 2, Toronto FC → Los Angeles Galaxy. 2008-08-21: Los Angeles Galaxy acquired second-round and first-round selections in the 2009 Supplemental Draft and salary budget considerations from Toronto FC in exchange for forward Carlos Ruiz.
- Round 3, Columbus Crew → Colorado Rapids. 2007-02-28: Colorado Rapids acquired a third-round pick in the 2009 Supplemental Draft and defender Tim Ward from Columbus Crew in exchange for forward Nicolás Hernández.
- Round 3, D.C. United → Houston Dynamo. 2008-03-17: Houston Dynamo acquired a third-round pick in the 2009 Supplemental Draft from D.C. United in exchange for midfielder Jeremy Barlow.
- Round 3, San Jose Earthquakes → FC Dallas. 2008-04-03: FC Dallas acquired a third-round pick in the 2009 Supplemental Draft from San Jose Earthquakes in exchange for defender Jamil Roberts.
- Round 3, Toronto FC → New York Red Bulls. 2008-09-12: New York Red Bulls acquired third-round and fourth-round picks in the 2009 Supplemental Draft from Toronto FC in exchange for defender Hunter Freeman.
- Round 4, Real Salt Lake → New York Red Bulls. 2007-02-23: New York Red Bulls acquired a fourth-round pick in the 2009 Supplemental Draft and a fourth-round pick in the 2008 MLS SuperDraft from Real Salt Lake in exchange for goalkeeper Nick Rimando.
- Round 4, New York Red Bulls → Colorado Rapids. 2007-03-23: Colorado Rapids acquired a fourth-round pick in the 2009 Supplemental Draft and a third-round pick in the 2008 MLS SuperDraft from New York Red Bulls in exchange for defender Hunter Freeman.
- Round 4, Chicago Fire → Toronto FC. 2007-04-07: Toronto FC acquired a fourth-round pick in the 2009 Supplemental Draft from Chicago Fire in exchange for goalkeeper Jon Busch.
- Round 4, San Jose Earthquakes → Los Angeles Galaxy. 2008-04-03: Los Angeles Galaxy acquired a fourth-round pick in the 2009 Supplemental Draft from San Jose Earthquakes in exchange for midfielder Matt Hatzke.
- Round 4, Toronto FC → New York Red Bulls. 2008-09-12: New York Red Bulls acquired fourth-round and third-round picks in the 2009 Supplemental Draft from Toronto FC in exchange for defender Hunter Freeman.

== Notable undrafted players ==
=== Homegrown players ===
Original MLS team	Player	Position	College	Conference	Notes
Houston Dynamo	Tyler Deric	Goalkeeper	North Carolina	ACC	

=== Others ===
Original MLS team	Player	Position	College	Conference	Notes
Columbus Crew	Josh Williams	Defender	Cleveland State	Horizon	125 MLS appearances
—N/a	Alejandro Bedoya	Midfielder	Boston College	ACC	66 USMNT appearances signed for Örebro SK in Sweden

== See also ==
- Draft (sports)
- Generation Adidas
- Major League Soccer
- MLS SuperDraft
