= Robert Edmans =

English footballer

Rob Edmans
Personal information
- Full name: Robert Michael Edmans
- Date of birth: 25 January 1987 (age 39)
- Place of birth: Greenwich, England
- Position: Forward

College career
Years	Team	Apps	(Gls)
2007	Virginia Tech Hokies	23	(7)

Senior career*
Years	Team	Apps	(Gls)
2005–2007	Loughborough University		
2007	Loughborough Dynamo		
2007	Tiptree United		
2007–2008	Maldon Town		
2008–2009	Loughborough Dynamo		
2009	Witham Town		
2009–2011	Chelmsford City	72	(19)
2011–2013	Dagenham & Redbridge	4	(0)
2012	→ Dover Athletic (loan)	8	(2)
2012	→ Macclesfield Town (loan)	3	(0)
2012	→ Chelmsford City (loan)	4	(1)
2013–2014	Chelmsford City	47	(13)
- * Club domestic league appearances and goals

Robert Michael Edmans (born 25 January 1987) is an English former footballer who played as a forward.

== Career ==
Edmans attended Great Baddow High School, before going onto study at Loughborough University, playing for both Loughborough University and Loughborough Dynamo whilst enrolled. In 2007, Edmans began studying at Virginia Tech, playing for the Virginia Tech Hokies, alongside future Ghana international Patrick Nyarko in college soccer, where he scored seven goals in 23 appearances.

Upon his return to England he joining Tiptree United then Maldon Town in 2007–08. The following season he returned to Leicestershire and played for Loughborough Dynamo in the Northern Premier League. He impressed Chelmsford during a pre-season game Chelmsford City before joining Dagenham & Redbridge.

He made his FA Cup debut for Dagenham against Millwall on 17 January 2012, coming on a substitute In March 2012, Edmans joined Conference South side Dover Athletic on loan until the end of the season.

On 1 February 2013, Edmans signed a contract with Chelmsford City after having his contract terminated by Dagenham and Redbridge by mutual consent.

== Career statistics ==
As of match played 26 April 2014.

Club statistics
Club	Season	League			FA Cup		League Cup		Other		Total	
Club	Season	Division	Apps	Goals	Apps	Goals	Apps	Goals	Apps	Goals	Apps	Goals
Chelmsford City	2009–10	Conference South	37	8	3	2	—		9 (Note: 4 appearances in FA Trophy, 4 appearances and 4 goals in Essex Senior Cup, 1 appearance in Conference South play-offs)	4	49	14
Chelmsford City	2010–11	Conference South	35	11	3	1	—		1 (Note: Appearance(s) in Essex Senior Cup)	0	39	12
Chelmsford City	Total		72	19	6	3	—		10	4	88	26
Dagenham & Redbridge	2011–12	League Two	3	0	1	0	0	0	0	0	4	0
Dagenham & Redbridge	2012–13	League Two	1	0	0	0	0	0	0	0	1	0
Dagenham & Redbridge	Total		4	0	1	0	0	0	0	0	5	0
Dover Athletic (loan)	2011–12	Conference South	8	2	0	0	—		0	0	8	2
Macclesfield Town (loan)	2012–13	Conference Premier	3	0	0	0	—		0	0	3	0
Chelmsford City (loan)	2012–13	Conference South	4	1	3	2	—		5 (Note: Appearance(s) FA Trophy)	2	12	5
Chelmsford City	2012–13	Conference South	18	6	0	0	—		2 (Note: Appearance(s) in Conference South play-offs)	0	20	6
Chelmsford City	2013–14	Conference South	29	7	1	0	—		2 (Note: 1 appearance in FA Trophy, 1 appearance in Essex Senior Cup)	1	32	8
Chelmsford City	Total		51	14	4	2	—		9	3	64	19
Career total			138	35	11	5	0	0	19	7	168	47
