= Ryan Solle =

American soccer player

Personal information
- Full name: Ryan Solle
- Date of birth: September 11, 1985 (age 41)
- Place of birth: Sanford, North Carolina, United States
- Height: 5 ft 8 in (1.73 m)
- Position: Midfielder

Youth career
- 2003–2006: Wake Forest Demon Deacons

Senior career*
Years	Team	Apps	(Gls)
2005	Raleigh CASL Elite	6	(0)
2006	Carolina Dynamo	9	(0)
2007	New England Revolution	0	(0)
2008	Carolina RailHawks	19	(0)
2009	Wilmington Hammerheads	11	(1)
- * Club domestic league appearances and goals as of 11 October 2009

Ryan Solle (born September 11, 1985, in Sanford, North Carolina) is an American soccer player, currently without a club.

== Career ==
=== High school ===
Solle grew up in Broadway, North Carolina, played club soccer for the Fayetteville Force with whom he won three consecutive North Carolina state championships (1999, 2000 and 2001), and attended Lee County High School in Sanford, North Carolina, where he was selected as a 2003 Parade Magazine High School All-American.

=== College ===
He played college soccer Wake Forest University from 2003 to 2006, and finished second on the Wake Forest career assist list with twenty-seven in fifty games.

During his college years Solle also played in the USL Premier Development League for both Raleigh CASL Elite and Carolina Dynamo.

=== Professional ===
Solle was drafted in the second round (25th overall) of the 2007 MLS SuperDraft by New England Revolution, but never played a first team game with the team and was released on August 31, 2007. In the spring of 2008, he signed with the Carolina RailHawks of the USL First Division, and played his first professional game in a 1–1 tie with the Atlanta Silverbacks.

In 2009 Solle moved to play with the Wilmington Hammerheads of the USL Second Division.

=== International ===
Solle played a single game with the U.S. U-18 team in 2003. In February 2007, he joined the United States under-23 men's national soccer team for a tour of Japan.

== Honors ==
=== Wilmington Hammerheads ===
- USL Second Division Regular Season Champions (1): 2009
