= Evan Brown (soccer) =

American soccer player (born 1987)

Personal information
- Date of birth: May 1, 1987 (age 39)
- Place of birth: Raleigh, North Carolina, United States
- Height: 5 ft 11 in (1.80 m)
- Position: Defender

College career
Years	Team	Apps	(Gls)
2005–2008	Wake Forest Demon Deacons	89	(4)

Senior career*
Years	Team	Apps	(Gls)
2007–2008	Cary RailHawks U23s	21	(1)
2009	Seattle Sounders FC	0	(0)
2010	CASL Elite		
- * Club domestic league appearances and goals as of June 16, 2010

Evan Brown (born May 1, 1987, in Raleigh, North Carolina) is an American retired soccer player.

== Career ==
=== High school ===
Brown attended Millbrook High School, where he was a three-year letter winner as well as a three time academy all conference player. He was named All-VI Conference twice and earned all-region player in his senior year. He played club soccer for Capital Area Soccer League (CASL) for head coach Bruce Talbot, with whom he captured four state championships, a regional championship and a national finals berth, as well as a pair of Disney Soccer Showcase Titles.

Brown played college soccer at Wake Forest University from 2005 to 2008, finishing his career ranked sixth in games played with 89.

During his college years Brown also played for Cary RailHawks U23s in the USL Premier Development League.

=== Professional ===
Brown was drafted in the second round (16th overall) of the 2009 MLS SuperDraft by Seattle Sounders FC. Coach Sigi Schmid stated, "Evan has tremendous endurance, and likes to get forward.". He made his professional debut on April 29, 2009, in a U.S. Open Cup match against Real Salt Lake. Brown was waived by Seattle in November, 2009, having never played an MLS game for the team.

Brown played the amateur team CASL Elite in the Lamar Hunt U.S. Open Cup in 2010; his team won their regional qualification group (which also featured NPSL teams FC Tulsa and Atlanta FC) before falling 4–2 to USL Second Division pro side Charleston Battery in the first round of tournament proper.

== Honors ==
=== Wake Forest University ===
- NCAA Men's Division I Soccer Championship (1): 2007

=== Seattle Sounders FC ===
- Lamar Hunt U.S. Open Cup (1): 2009
