= Neil Covone =

American soccer player

Personal information
- Full name: Neil Covone
- Date of birth: August 31, 1969 (age 57)
- Place of birth: Hialeah, Florida, United States
- Height: 5 ft 6 in (1.68 m)
- Position: Midfielder

Youth career
- 1988–1990: Wake Forest University

Senior career*
Years	Team	Apps	(Gls)
1991–1992	Fort Lauderdale Strikers	17	(1)

International career^{‡}
1988–1990	United States	5	(0)
- * Club domestic league appearances and goals as of 31 May 2006 ‡ National team caps and goals as of 22 June 2006

Neil Covone (born August 31, 1969) is a retired U.S. soccer midfielder. He played five games for the United States men's national soccer team and was a member of the U.S. team at the 1990 FIFA World Cup. His older brother, Mike Covone, also played soccer.

== College ==
In college, he played at Wake Forest University in the Atlantic Coast Conference (ACC) from 1987 to 1990, His highest achievement came when he was named the MVP of the 1989 ACC Tournament. He was also a third-team All-American in 1988 and 1989.

== National team ==
Besides playing five games with the senior national team and at Wake Forest, Neil captained the U.S. team at the 1989 FIFA U-20 World Cup in Saudi Arabia. This team, coached by Bob Gansler, finished fourth at the tournament. The team was also noted for having future U.S. superstar goalkeeper Kasey Keller between the sticks.

Covone earned five caps with the U.S. national team. His first game was a 3–0 loss to Chile on June 5, 1989. He came on for Jimmy Banks. He then played sporadically over the next year. His last game was a 4–1 win over Liechtenstein on May 30, 1990. Gansler then selected him for the U.S. roster at the 1990 FIFA World Cup. However, he never entered a game at the cup and did not play again for the national team.

== Professional career ==
After graduating from college, he played two seasons with the Fort Lauderdale Strikers of the American Professional Soccer League. In 1991, he played in 12 games, scoring one goal, as the Strikers went to the APSL semifinals only to fall to the San Francisco Bay Blackhawks. In 1992, Covone saw time in only five games, scoring no goals, with the Strikers.

== Post-soccer career ==
He is currently a partner with the law firm of Kubicki Draper. Prior to that he was a partner with the Bice Cole Law Firm, PL, in Coral Gables, Florida.
