= Dori Arad =

Israeli footballer (born 1982)

Dori Arad דורי ארד
Personal information
- Full name: Dori Arad
- Date of birth: September 6, 1982 (age 44)
- Place of birth: HaHotrim, Israel
- Height: 5 ft 10 in (1.78 m)
- Position: Defensive midfielder

Youth career
- Maccabi Haifa

College career
Years	Team	Apps	(Gls)
2005–2008	University of Connecticut		

Senior career*
Years	Team	Apps	(Gls)
2001–2004	Maccabi Netanya	7	(0)
2004–2005	Ironi Nir Ramat HaSharon		
2011–2013	NYU Violets		
- * Club domestic league appearances and goals

Dori Arad (Hebrew: דורי ארד; born 6 September 1982) is an Israeli former footballer. He retired from play after the 2013 NCAA tournament.

== Early life ==
Arad was born in kibbutz HaHotrim, Israel, to a Jewish family. His youngest brother is Israeli footballer Ofri Arad.

== Honours ==
- Big East
  - 2007
