= Julian Valentin =

American soccer player

Personal information
- Full name: Julian Edward Valentin
- Date of birth: February 23, 1987 (age 39)
- Place of birth: Lancaster, Pennsylvania, United States
- Height: 6 ft 0 in (1.83 m)
- Position: Defender

College career
Years	Team	Apps	(Gls)
2004–2007	Wake Forest Demon Deacons		

Senior career*
Years	Team	Apps	(Gls)
2008–2009	Los Angeles Galaxy	1	(0)
2009	→ Cleveland City Stars (loan)	7	(1)
2010	FC Tampa Bay	29	(2)
Total		37	(3)

International career
2003–2004	United States U17	11	(0)
2005–2007	United States U20	25	(0)
2006–2008	United States U23	4	(0)
- * Club domestic league appearances and goals

Julian Valentin (born February 23, 1987) is an American retired professional soccer player.

== Career ==
=== Amateur ===
A four-year starter at Wake Forest University, Valentin appeared in 84 games from 2003 to 2007. Named NSCAA First Team All-South and Second Team All-America, Soccer America First-Team All-American and All-ACC First Team in 2006, Valentin was also named to ESPN's Academic All-District III team and was one of three NCAA starters on U-20 Men's National Team. Valentin captained the Demon Deacons to their first NCAA National Championship title in 2007 and famously took a cleat to the face in the final minutes of the game.

=== Professional ===
Valentin was selected by the Los Angeles Galaxy with the 29th overall pick in the 2008 MLS SuperDraft. With the MLS Reserve Division having been scrapped at the end of 2008, the LA Galaxy loaned Valentin to Cleveland City Stars in the USL First Division on May 15, 2009.

Valentin signed with USSF Division 2 club FC Tampa Bay on 5 February 2010 and was named club captain on 6 April 2010.

On 3 February 2011, Valentin officially retired from professional play and accepted a job with the Colorado Rockies of Major League Baseball. Valentin is of Puerto Rican descent. Valentin is the older brother of Zarek Valentin of Minnesota United and brother in-law of Taylor Kemp, formerly of DC United.
