= Marcus Tracy =

American soccer player (born 1986)

Personal information
- Full name: Marcus Garin Tracy
- Date of birth: October 2, 1986 (age 40)
- Place of birth: Chestnut Hill, Pennsylvania, United States
- Height: 6 ft 1 in (1.85 m)
- Position: Forward

College career
Years	Team	Apps	(Gls)
2005–2008	Wake Forest Demon Deacons		

Senior career*
Years	Team	Apps	(Gls)
2008	Carolina Dynamo	3	(1)
2009–2012	AaB	15	(2)
2012–2013	San Jose Earthquakes	5	(0)
- * Club domestic league appearances and goals as of November 23, 2013

Marcus Garin Tracy (born October 2, 1986) is an American soccer player who plays as a striker.

== Career ==
=== College and amateur ===
Although born in Chestnut Hill section of Philadelphia, Tracy grew up in Newtown, CT, playing soccer at Newtown High School where he was named an All-American (and had his #3 jersey retired) and was a member of the 2004 Class LL Connecticut State Championship team. He finished with 100 goals in his high school career. Tracy also played for Beachside Soccer Club in his youth. His brother Ryan Tracy played soccer at the University of Pennsylvania.

He won the 2008 Hermann Trophy for the nation's most outstanding college player while at Wake Forest University where he scored 13 goals and 10 assists in 24 games. In 2007, he won the 2007 College Cup with the Demon Deacons while scoring 11 goals and 9 assists in 26 games. In the College Cup final, Tracy scored the tying goal and assisted on the winning goal in the Demon Deacons 2–1 victory over Ohio State. Tracy was named the Offensive MVP of the 2007 College Cup tournament. In 2006, he scored 6 goals and 4 assists in 22 games with the Demon Deacons. In 2006, Tracy also scored 1 goal in 3 appearances for USL Premier Development League side Carolina Dynamo, although injury limited the number of games in which he appeared. In 2005, Tracy did not score in the 5 games that he played in an injury-filled season with the Deamon Deacons. Tracy's career totals for Wake Forest were 77 games played, 30 goals scored and 23 assists.

=== Professional ===
Tracy was drafted by Major League Soccer club Houston Dynamo in the 2009 MLS SuperDraft. Though he was expected to be a top pick, he was selected fifty-sixth overall, falling so low due to clubs having the knowledge of his contract with Danish club Aalborg.

On January 15, 2009, Tracy joined the club in Denmark on a three-year contract and made his debut for Aalborg on March 19, 2009, as a substitute in a UEFA Cup quarter final second leg against Manchester City in which he assisted on his team's first goal of the game a few minutes after entering as a substitute. He scored the winning goal against FC Midtjylland on March 23, 2009, in his first game in the Danish Superliga. He finished the 2008 - 2009 Danish Superliga with 7 games (including 3 starts) and 1 goal scored. Also in that season, he played 1 game in the Danish Cup and 1 game in the UEFA Cup.

In the 2009 - 2010 season, he scored the game-winner against FC Copenhagen on November 9, 2009. He also scored a goal while playing for Aalborg reserve team on September 12, 2009, against Otterup in the Danish 2nd Division West. He missed the remainder of the 2009 - 2010 season due to patellar tendinitis or jumper's knee. For the 2009 - 2010 season, Tracy played 8 games (including 4 starts) in the Danish Superliga with 1 goal scored as well as 2 games in the Danish Cup and 2 games in qualification games for the UEFA Cup. He scored 1 goal in 5 games with the Aalborg BK reserve team in the Danish 2nd Division West. Tracy continued to be sidelined for the rest of 2010 with knee injuries.

His injuries continued to sideline him through the 2010 - 2011 season and the first half of the 2011 - 2012 season. After missing such a significant amount of time due to his injuries, Tracy was not going to have his contract renewed over the winter break per Aalborg's announcement on October 3, 2011. He spent the first half of 2012 working on regaining his fitness after his knee injury issues and targeting a move to Major League Soccer.

On September 11, 2012, Tracy signed a contract with MLS and his new club will be decided by a weighed lottery On September 13, the San Jose Earthquakes won the lottery for Tracy. The team had a 4.6% chance of landing Tracy.

Tracy was not retained following the 2013 season.

=== International ===
On December 22, 2009, Tracy received his first call up to play with the senior US national team. Training in Carson, California began for Tracy and the other players called up on January 4, 2010, leading up to a friendly match against Honduras. Prior to the game, Tracy was released from training due to knee tendinitis which would continue to plague him throughout his career.

This senior team call-up was Tracy's first national team experience at any level having not been part of any of the youth teams.

== Honors ==
=== Wake Forest University ===
- 2007 - NCAA Men's Division I Soccer Champion
- 2007 - NCAA Men's Division I Soccer Tournament Offensive MVP
- 2008 - Hermann Trophy
- 2008 - NSCAA 1st Team All-America

=== Other ===
- 2009 - Newtown, CT's Sportsman of the Year
