= Cody Arnoux =

American soccer player (born 1988)

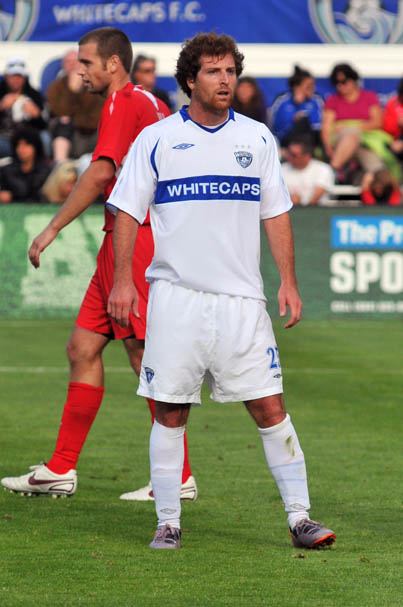

Personal information
- Full name: Cody Charles Arnoux
- Date of birth: April 13, 1988 (age 38)
- Place of birth: Stony Brook, New York, U.S.
- Height: 5 ft 10 in (1.78 m)
- Position: Forward

College career
Years	Team	Apps	(Gls)
2006–2008	Wake Forest Demon Deacons	64	(33)

Senior career*
Years	Team	Apps	(Gls)
2007–2009	Carolina Dynamo	16	(14)
2009–2010	Everton	0	(0)
2010	Vancouver Whitecaps	7	(1)
2011–2012	Real Salt Lake	2	(0)
2012–2015	Wilmington Hammerheads	58	(7)
Total		84	(22)

International career^{‡}
2003	United States U15		
2006	United States U18		
- * Club domestic league appearances and goals as of September 16, 2015 ‡ National team caps and goals as of July 7, 2010

Cody Charles Arnoux (born April 13, 1988, in Stony Brook, New York) is an American soccer player.

His previous clubs include NCAA affiliated Atlantic Coast Conference University team Wake Forest Demon Deacons, USL Premier Development League club side Carolina Dynamo and English Premier League club Everton.

== Career ==
=== College and amateur ===
Arnoux attended New Hanover High School in Wilmington, North Carolina, played club soccer for the Cape Fear Breakers, and played college soccer at Wake Forest University from 2006 to 2008, where he made 64 appearances and scored 33 goals in the NCAA Division I Atlantic Coast Conference. He scored fourteen goals in sixteen appearances in three campaigns for Carolina Dynamo in the USL Premier Development League

=== Professional ===
Arnoux signed for English Premier League club Everton on a one-year contract in August 2009 following a trial in March 2009 which also saw compatriot Anton Peterlin sign for the Liverpool-based club. In March 2010, he attended a trial with Scottish Premier League team Motherwell. He was released by Everton at the end of the 2009–10 season, having played seven times for the reserve team, and he went on trial with League One team Plymouth Argyle.

Arnoux signed for USSF Division 2 club Vancouver Whitecaps on August 18, 2010, and made his first professional appearance for the team the following day, August 19, 2010, in a game against FC Tampa Bay. He scored his first professional goal on October 2, 2010, in Vancouver's last game of the 2010 USSFD2 regular season, a 2–2 tie with the Portland Timbers.

Prior to the 2011 season MLS rejected Arnoux's contract with the Whitecaps as they feel that both parties attempted to bypass the draft process. Since Arnoux was signed for 2011 the Whitecaps have assigned him to train for their PDL team.

On February 8, 2011, he was released from his contract and the following day he signed with Major League Soccer. On February 11 he was assigned to Real Salt Lake in a lottery draft.

After being released by Salt Lake in June 2012, Arnoux signed with USL Pro club Wilmington Hammerheads on July 5, 2012.

=== International ===
Arnoux has been capped for the United States at under-15 and under-18 level.

== Personal life ==
Arnoux holds an Italian passport.

== Achievements ==
=== Wake Forest Demon Deacons ===
- NCAA Division I Men's Soccer Championship: 2007

== Career statistics ==
Club	League	Season	League		Cup		League Cup		Continental		Total	
Club	League	Season	Apps	Goals	Apps	Goals	Apps	Goals	Apps	Goals	Apps	Goals
Carolina Dynamo	USL PDL	2007	1	2	0	0	0	0	0	0	1	2
Carolina Dynamo	USL PDL	2008	8	4	0	0	0	0	0	0	8	4
Carolina Dynamo	USL PDL	2009	7	8	0	0	0	0	0	0	7	8
Everton	Premier League	2009–10	0	0	0	0	0	0	0	0	0	0
Vancouver Whitecaps FC	USSF Division 2	2010	10	1	0	0	0	0	0	0	10	1
Real Salt Lake	Major League Soccer	2011	2	0	0	0	0	0	0	0	2	0
Real Salt Lake	Major League Soccer	2011	0	0	1	0	0	0	0	0	1	0
Wilmington Hammerheads	USL Professional Division	2012	6	1	0	0	0	0	0	0	6	1
Career totals			34	17	1	0	0	0	0	0	35	17
