= 2026 North Carolina Tar Heels men's soccer team =

American college soccer season

2026 North Carolina Tar Heels men's soccer

ACC tournament champions
- Conference: Atlantic Coast Conference
- U. Soc. Coaches poll: No. 12
- TopDrawerSoccer.com: No. 3
- Record: 11–2–6 (3–1–4 ACC)
- Head coach: Carlos Somoano (16th season)
- Assistant coaches: Michael Callahan; Michael Harrington; Jeff Negalha
- Home stadium: Dorrance Field

2026 ACC men's soccer standings
| | Conf. | | | | | Overall |
| Team | W | | L | | T | W | | L | | T |
|---|---|---|---|---|---|---|---|---|---|---|
| No. 1 SMU †+ | 6 | – | 0 | – | 2 | 14 | – | 1 | – | 3 |
| No. 5 Clemson + | 6 | – | 1 | – | 1 | 13 | – | 3 | – | 2 |
| No. 20 Wake Forest + | 5 | – | 3 | – | 0 | 11 | – | 5 | – | 3 |
| No. 13 Louisville + | 4 | – | 2 | – | 2 | 12 | – | 3 | – | 3 |
| No. 21 Pittsburgh + | 4 | – | 2 | – | 2 | 9 | – | 4 | – | 4 |
| Virginia Tech | 4 | – | 2 | – | 2 | 8 | – | 6 | – | 3 |
| No. 12 North Carolina ‡ | 3 | – | 1 | – | 4 | 11 | – | 2 | – | 6 |
| Notre Dame | 4 | – | 4 | – | 0 | 7 | – | 5 | – | 4 |
| Virginia | 3 | – | 3 | – | 2 | 7 | – | 7 | – | 4 |
| California + | 2 | – | 4 | – | 2 | 6 | – | 5 | – | 5 |
| NC State + | 1 | – | 3 | – | 4 | 7 | – | 6 | – | 6 |
| Stanford + | 1 | – | 4 | – | 3 | 9 | – | 5 | – | 3 |
| Syracuse + | 1 | – | 5 | – | 2 | 8 | – | 8 | – | 3 |
| Boston College | 1 | – | 6 | – | 1 | 6 | – | 6 | – | 4 |
| Duke | 1 | – | 6 | – | 1 | 7 | – | 10 | – | 1 |
† – Conference champion ‡ – ACC tournament champion + – At-large invitation to the 2026 NCAA tournament; As of November 15, 2026; Rankings from United Soccer Coaches; Source:The ACC

The 2026 North Carolina Tar Heels men's soccer team represents the University of North Carolina at Chapel Hill during the 2026 NCAA Division I men's soccer season. The Tar Heels are led by head coach Carlos Somoano, in his sixteenth season. They play their home games at Dorrance Field in Chapel Hill, North Carolina, and compete in the Atlantic Coast Conference (ACC).

North Carolina began the season ranked fourteenth in the United Soccer Coaches poll and were picked to finish sixth in the ACC preseason coaches' poll. The Tar Heels opened with a 1–1 draw at fifth-ranked Georgetown, in which Rutgers transfer Joschi Schelb scored his first goal for the team, before a 3–2 loss at Memphis left them winless in their first two matches for the first time since 2019. They drew top-ranked Stanford 2–2 at home on September 11, but a 2–1 home loss to Clemson on September 19 left them winless in their first three ACC matches. It was the Tar Heels' last defeat of the regular season. Their 7–1 win over Notre Dame on October 10, which included a Schelb hat-trick, was the program's highest-scoring match against an ACC opponent since a 7–1 win over NC State in 2000. Six days later, a goal from Max Fisher earned a 1–0 win at seventh-ranked Pittsburgh, the Tar Heels' fifth straight win. Schelb added a second hat-trick in a 6–0 win over William & Mary.

The Tar Heels finished the regular season 8–2–5 and 3–1–4 in ACC play. As the seventh seed in the ACC Tournament, they drew tenth seed California 1–1 in the First Round after a late Schelb equalizer, and advanced 4–3 on penalties after goalkeeper Alan Rutkowski made two saves in the shootout. The result extended their unbeaten run to nine matches since the loss to Clemson, whom they will face in the Quarterfinals. Schelb's sixteen goals rank second in the nation and are the most by a Tar Heel in a season since Billy Schuler scored sixteen in 2011.

== Previous season ==
The Tar Heels finished the 2025 regular season 8–4–4 and 2–2–4 in ACC play. As the ninth seed in the ACC Tournament, they defeated Notre Dame 3–1 in the First Round before losing 2–1 at top seed Virginia in the Quarterfinals. The Tar Heels received an at-large bid to the NCAA Tournament, the program's 32nd appearance. They advanced past North Florida on penalties in the First Round before losing on penalties to fourth seed Maryland in the Second Round, finishing the season 9–5–6. Following the season, three Tar Heels were selected in the 2026 MLS SuperDraft: Jack Sandmeyer and Dylan Kropp in the first round, and Luca Nikolai in the third round. It was the first time since 2015 that the program had two first-round picks.

== Player movement ==
=== Players leaving ===
Players leaving
| Name | Number | Pos. | Height | Weight | Year | Hometown | Reason for Departure |
|---|---|---|---|---|---|---|---|
| Andrew Cordes | 1 | GK | 6'2" | 195 | Senior | Denver, Colorado | Graduated |
| Scott Cheevers | 2 | DF | 6'5" | 208 | Freshman | Nashville, Tennessee | Transferred to Wofford |
| Dylan Kropp | 4 | DF | 6'2" | 186 | Senior | Powell, Ohio | Graduated; selected 25th overall in the 2026 MLS SuperDraft |
| Immanuel Mathe | 5 | DF | 6'3" | 165 | Freshman | Burnaby, British Columbia | — |
| Nacho Abeal | 7 | FW | 5'8" | 159 | Graduate Student | A Coruña, Spain | Graduated |
| Abubaker Mayanja | 8 | FW | 5'9" | 136 | Freshman | Kampala, Uganda | — |
| John McDowell | 14 | MF | 5'11" | 178 | Junior | Chapel Hill, North Carolina | — |
| Maclovio Swett | 16 | MF | 5'5" | 120 | Junior | Denver, Colorado | — |
| Lucas Ross | 17 | FW | 5'11" | 175 | Senior | Verona, New Jersey | Graduated |
| Javier Hernandez | 18 | FW | 6'0" | 172 | Freshman | Riverside, California | Transferred to Portland |
| Milton Jones | 20 | FW | 5'4" | 146 | Sophomore | Glassboro, New Jersey | — |
| Parker O'Ferral | 21 | DF | 6'0" | 173 | Senior | Raleigh, North Carolina | Graduated |
| Callum Frogson | 23 | DF | 6'2" | 187 | Senior | Nottingham, England | Graduated |
| Luis Vera | 25 | MF | 5'7" | 144 | Freshman | San José, Costa Rica | — |
| Andrew Czech | 27 | MF | 5'11" | 168 | Graduate Student | Elmhurst, Illinois | Graduated |
| Jack Sandmeyer | 28 | MF | 6'6" | 185 | Graduate Student | San Diego, California | Graduated; selected 18th overall in the 2026 MLS SuperDraft |
| Gabriel Bracken Serra | 29 | MF | 5'9" | 163 | Graduate Student | Berkeley, California | Graduated |
| Yaya Bakayoko | 35 | FW | 5'9" | 155 | Graduate Student | Bronx, New York | Graduated |

Luca Nikolai was selected 87th overall in the 2026 MLS SuperDraft by New York City FC, but returned to North Carolina for the 2026 season.

=== Players arriving ===
==== Incoming transfers ====
Incoming transfers
| Name | Number | Pos. | Height | Weight | Year | Hometown | Previous School |
|---|---|---|---|---|---|---|---|
| Nick Lockermann | 5 | DF | 5'11" | 175 | Senior | Nuremberg, Germany | Vermont |
| Nico Loebus | 8 | MF | 6'2" | 176 | Sophomore | Bad Homburg, Germany | Vermont |
| Joschi Schelb | 10 | FW | 6'1" | 182 | Senior | Freiburg, Germany | Rutgers |
| Evans Dapaah | 16 | MF | 5'10" | 160 | Senior | Accra, Ghana | Campbell |
| Ryan Zellefrow | 27 | MF | 5'10" | 160 | Junior | Berwyn, Pennsylvania | Vermont |

==== Recruiting class ====
| Name | Nat. | Hometown | Previous club / school |
|---|---|---|---|
| Myles Carson; DF | USA | Bedford, Texas | Allegiance Academy |
| Steven Oyirwoth; DF | UGA | Pakwach, Uganda | KCCA FC |
| Jace Donawa; FW | BER | Sandys, Bermuda | Northwood School |
| Marco Simion; GK | USA | Miami, Florida | Miami FC |
| Faraji Ramani; MF | MWI | Dzaleka, Malawi | Houston Dynamo |
| Jonathan Luna Sabando; MF | USA | Irving, Texas | Allegiance Academy |
| Lorenzo D'Agostini; FW | USA | Miami, Florida | Rimini FC |
| Benjamin Maitre; MF | FRA | Boulogne-Billancourt, France | Stade Brestois 29 |
| Etienne Veillard; DF | USA | Federal Way, Washington | Seattle Sounders Academy |
| Jayden Puna; DF | USA | Pearland, Texas | Houston Dynamo |
| Quinton John; DF | USA | Margate, Florida | Inter Miami |
| Jarle Petzold; MF | NOR | Ås, Norway | Follo FK |

== Squad ==
=== Roster ===
As of November 7, 2026

Note: Flags indicate national team as defined under FIFA eligibility rules; some limited exceptions apply. Players may hold more than one non-FIFA nationality.

| No. | Pos. | Nation | Player |
|---|---|---|---|
| 0 | GK | USA | Coleman Catlett |
| 1 | GK | USA | Alan Rutkowski |
| 2 | DF | USA | Myles Carson |
| 4 | DF | UGA | Steven Oyirwoth |
| 5 | DF | GER | Nick Lockermann |
| 6 | MF | SWE | Charlie Antonelius |
| 7 | FW | BER | Jace Donawa |
| 8 | MF | GER | Nico Loebus |
| 9 | FW | USA | Dan Klink |
| 10 | FW | GER | Joschi Schelb |
| 11 | FW | USA | Ryan Dugan |
| 12 | GK | USA | Marco Simion |
| 13 | DF | GER | Luca Nikolai |
| 14 | MF | MAW | Faraji Ramani |
| 15 | DF | ENG | Max Fisher |

| No. | Pos. | Nation | Player |
|---|---|---|---|
| 16 | MF | GHA | Evans Dapaah |
| 17 | DF | USA | Drew Waller |
| 18 | MF | USA | Jonathan Luna Sabando |
| 19 | FW | DEN | Bertil Rygaard Hansen |
| 20 | FW | USA | Lorenzo D'Agostini |
| 21 | MF | FRA | Benjamin Maitre |
| 22 | DF | USA | Etienne Veillard |
| 23 | DF | USA | Jayden Puna |
| 24 | GK | SUI | Alejandro Saborio Perez |
| 25 | MF | USA | David Molina |
| 26 | FW | DEN | Martin Mai |
| 27 | MF | USA | Ryan Zellefrow |
| 28 | DF | USA | Quinton John |
| 33 | DF | USA | Riley Berge |
| 34 | MF | NOR | Jarle Petzold |

=== Team management ===
| Position | Staff |
|---|---|
| Head coach | (United States) Carlos Somoano |
| Assistant coach | Michael Callahan |
| Assistant coach | Michael Harrington |
| Assistant coach | Jeff Negalha |
| Director of Operations | Marco Genee |
| Director of Student-Athlete Development | Gabriel Colon |
| Director of Alumni Relations, Camps and Clinics | Grant Porter |

== Schedule ==
| Date Time, TV | Rank^{#} | Opponent^{#} | Result | Record | Site (Attendance) City, State |
Regular season
| August 20*; 7:30 p.m., ESPN+ | No. 14 | at No. 5 Georgetown | T 1–1 | 0–0–1 | Shaw Field (741); Washington, DC |
| August 24*; 8:00 p.m., ESPN+ | No. 14 | at Memphis | L 2–3 | 0–1–1 | Mike Rose Soccer Complex (875); Memphis, TN |
| August 28*; 7:30 p.m., ACCNX | No. 21 | VCU | W 1–0 | 1–1–1 | Dorrance Field (2,032); Chapel Hill, NC |
| September 6; 7:00 p.m., ACCNX | | at No. 21 California | T 2–2 | 1–1–2 (0–0–1) | Edwards Stadium (607); Berkeley, CA |
| September 11; 7:00 p.m., ACCNX | | No. 1 Stanford | T 2–2 | 1–1–3 (0–0–2) | Dorrance Field (2,031); Chapel Hill, NC |
| September 15*; 7:00 p.m., ACCNX | No. 23 | American | W 2–0 | 2–1–3 | Dorrance Field (1,070); Chapel Hill, NC |
| September 19; 7:00 p.m., ACCNX | No. 23 | No. 21 Clemson | L 1–2 | 2–2–3 (0–1–2) | Dorrance Field (1,693); Chapel Hill, NC |
| September 26*; 7:00 p.m., ACCNX | | Lipscomb | W 3–1 | 3–2–3 | Dorrance Field (2,065); Chapel Hill, NC |
| September 30*; 7:00 p.m., ACCNX | No. 20 | West Florida | W 2–0 | 4–2–3 | Dorrance Field (683); Chapel Hill, NC |
| October 3; 3:00 p.m., ACCNX | No. 20 | at Boston College | W 3–1 | 5–2–3 (1–1–2) | Newton Campus Soccer Field (784); Newton, MA |
| October 10; 7:00 p.m., ACCNX | No. 23 | Notre Dame | W 7–1 | 6–2–3 (2–1–2) | Dorrance Field (2,313); Chapel Hill, NC |
| October 16; 7:00 p.m., ACCNX | No. 20 | at No. 7 Pittsburgh | W 1–0 | 7–2–3 (3–1–2) | Ambrose Urbanic Field (667); Pittsburgh, PA |
| October 23; 8:00 p.m., ACCN | No. 16 | at Duke | T 2–2 | 7–2–4 (3–1–3) | Koskinen Stadium (2,307); Durham, NC |
| October 27*; 6:00 p.m., ACCNX | No. 15 | William & Mary | W 6–0 | 8–2–4 | Dorrance Field (563); Chapel Hill, NC |
| October 30; 7:00 p.m., ACCNX | No. 15 | NC State | T 1–1 | 8–2–5 (3–1–4) | Dorrance Field (2,116); Chapel Hill, NC |
ACC Tournament
| November 4*; 6:00 p.m., ACCNX | (7) No. 17 | (10) California; First Round | T 1–1 ^{2OT, 4–3 PK} | 8–2–6 | Dorrance Field (554); Chapel Hill, NC |
| November 8*; 12:00 p.m., ACCN | (7) No. 17 | at (2) No. 3 Clemson; Quarterfinals | W 3–2 ^{2OT} | 9–2–6 | Riggs Field (1,687); Clemson, SC |
| November 12*; 5:30 p.m., ACCN | (7) No. 12 | vs. (11) NC State; Semifinals | W 1–0 | 10–2–6 | WakeMed Soccer Park (3,253); Cary, NC |
| November 15*; 4:00 p.m., ESPNU | (7) No. 12 | vs. (1) No. 1 SMU; Final | W 3–0 | 11–2–6 | WakeMed Soccer Park (2,093); Cary, NC |
NCAA Tournament
| November 22*; 5:00 p.m., ESPN+ | (7) No. 12 | UNC Wilmington or Liberty; First Round | | | Dorrance Field; Chapel Hill, NC |
*Non-conference game. ^{#}Rankings from United Soccer Coaches. (#) Tournament seedings in parentheses. All times are in Eastern.

== Goals record ==
Through November 4, 2026.

| Rank | No. | Nat. | Po. | Name | Regular season | ACC Tournament | NCAA Tournament | Total |
|---|---|---|---|---|---|---|---|---|
| 1 | 10 | (Germany) | FW | Joschi Schelb | 15 | 1 | 0 | 16 |
| 2 | 13 | (Germany) | DF | Luca Nikolai | 4 | 0 | 0 | 4 |
| 2 | 27 | (United States) | MF | Ryan Zellefrow | 4 | 0 | 0 | 4 |
| 4 | 33 | (United States) | DF | Riley Berge | 3 | 0 | 0 | 3 |
| 5 | 7 | (Bermuda) | FW | Jace Donawa | 2 | 0 | 0 | 2 |
| 5 | 15 | (England) | DF | Max Fisher | 2 | 0 | 0 | 2 |
| 7 | 5 | (Germany) | DF | Nick Lockermann | 1 | 0 | 0 | 1 |
| 7 | 8 | (Germany) | MF | Nico Loebus | 1 | 0 | 0 | 1 |
| 7 | 9 | (United States) | FW | Dan Klink | 1 | 0 | 0 | 1 |
| 7 | 14 | (Malawi) | MF | Faraji Ramani | 1 | 0 | 0 | 1 |
| 7 | 16 | (Ghana) | MF | Evans Dapaah | 1 | 0 | 0 | 1 |
| 7 | 19 | (Denmark) | FW | Bertil Rygaard Hansen | 1 | 0 | 0 | 1 |
| Total | | | | | 36 | 1 | 0 | 37 |

== Disciplinary record ==
Through November 4, 2026. Does not include three cautions issued to the North Carolina bench.

| Rank | No. | Nat. | Po. | Name | Regular Season | | | ACC Tournament | | | NCAA Tournament | | | Total | | |
| Rank | No. | Nat. | Po. | Name | Yellow card | (yellow card) (yellow-red card) | Red card | Yellow card | (yellow card) (yellow-red card) | Red card | Yellow card | (yellow card) (yellow-red card) | Red card | Yellow card | (yellow card) (yellow-red card) | Red card |
|---|---|---|---|---|---|---|---|---|---|---|---|---|---|---|---|---|
| 1 | 13 | (Germany) | DF | Luca Nikolai | 4 | 0 | 0 | 1 | 0 | 0 | 0 | 0 | 0 | 5 | 0 | 0 |
| 2 | 15 | (England) | DF | Max Fisher | 4 | 0 | 0 | 0 | 0 | 0 | 0 | 0 | 0 | 4 | 0 | 0 |
| 3 | 5 | (Germany) | DF | Nick Lockermann | 3 | 0 | 0 | 0 | 0 | 0 | 0 | 0 | 0 | 3 | 0 | 0 |
| 4 | 10 | (Germany) | FW | Joschi Schelb | 2 | 0 | 0 | 0 | 0 | 0 | 0 | 0 | 0 | 2 | 0 | 0 |
| 4 | 16 | (Ghana) | MF | Evans Dapaah | 1 | 0 | 0 | 1 | 0 | 0 | 0 | 0 | 0 | 2 | 0 | 0 |
| 4 | 33 | (United States) | DF | Riley Berge | 2 | 0 | 0 | 0 | 0 | 0 | 0 | 0 | 0 | 2 | 0 | 0 |
| 7 | 22 | (United States) | DF | Etienne Veillard | 1 | 0 | 0 | 0 | 0 | 0 | 0 | 0 | 0 | 1 | 0 | 0 |
| 7 | 27 | (United States) | MF | Ryan Zellefrow | 1 | 0 | 0 | 0 | 0 | 0 | 0 | 0 | 0 | 1 | 0 | 0 |
| Total | | | | | 18 | 0 | 0 | 2 | 0 | 0 | 0 | 0 | 0 | 20 | 0 | 0 |

== Awards and honors ==
| Recipient | Award | Date | Ref. |
|---|---|---|---|
| Joschi Schelb | ACC Preseason Watch List | August 12 | |
| Joschi Schelb | Hermann Trophy Preseason Watch List | August 19 | |
| Ryan Zellefrow | Hermann Trophy Preseason Watch List | August 19 | |
| Joschi Schelb | Hermann Trophy Midseason Watch List | October 2 | |
| Joschi Schelb | ACC Offensive Player of the Week | October 6 | |
| Joschi Schelb | ACC Offensive Player of the Week | October 13 | |
| Alan Rutkowski | ACC Defensive Player of the Week | October 20 | |

== Rankings ==
Ranking movements Legend: ██ Increase in ranking ██ Decrease in ranking — = Not ranked RV = Received votes
| | Week | | | | | | | | | | | | | | | | |
| Poll | Pre | 1 | 2 | 3 | 4 | 5 | 6 | 7 | 8 | 9 | 10 | 11 | 12 | 13 | 14 | 15 | Final |
|---|---|---|---|---|---|---|---|---|---|---|---|---|---|---|---|---|---|
| United Soccer | 14 | 21 | RV | RV | 23 | RV | 20 | 23 | 20 | 16 | 15 | 17 | | Not released | | | |
| TopDrawer Soccer | 25 | 25 | 20 | 24 | — | — | — | — | — | 21 | 8 | 11 | 12 | | | | |
| College Soccer News | 20 | — | — | — | RV | — | — | — | RV | 23 | 19 | 18 | | | Not released | | |
