= 2026 Syracuse Orange men's soccer team =

American college soccer season

2026 Syracuse Orange men's soccer
- Conference: Atlantic Coast Conference
- Record: 7–7–3 (1–5–2 ACC)
- Head coach: Ian McIntyre (17th season)
- Assistant coaches: Jukka Masalin (17th season); Matty Evans
- Home stadium: SU Soccer Stadium

2026 ACC men's soccer standings
	Conf.					Overall
Team	W		L		T	W		L		T
No. 2 SMU †	6	–	0	–	2	12	–	0	–	3
No. 3 Clemson	6	–	1	–	1	12	–	2	–	2
No. 15 Wake Forest	5	–	3	–	0	11	–	4	–	2
No. 20 Pittsburgh	4	–	2	–	2	9	–	4	–	3
No. 8 Louisville	4	–	2	–	2	12	–	2	–	3
Virginia Tech	4	–	2	–	2	8	–	5	–	3
No. 17 North Carolina	3	–	1	–	4	8	–	2	–	5
Notre Dame	4	–	4	–	0	7	–	5	–	3
Virginia	3	–	3	–	2	7	–	6	–	3
California	2	–	4	–	2	6	–	5	–	4
NC State	1	–	3	–	4	5	–	5	–	6
Stanford	1	–	4	–	3	8	–	4	–	3
Syracuse	1	–	5	–	2	7	–	7	–	2
Boston College	1	–	6	–	1	6	–	6	–	3
Duke	1	–	6	–	1	7	–	9	–	1
† – Conference champion ‡ – ACC tournament champion + – At-large invitation to the 2026 NCAA tournament; As of November 3, 2026; Rankings from United Soccer Coaches; Source:The ACC

The 2026 Syracuse Orange men's soccer team represents Syracuse University during the 2026 NCAA Division I men's soccer season. The Orange are led by head coach Ian McIntyre, in his seventeenth season; McIntyre and associate head coach Jukka Masalin joined the program in 2010, and led Syracuse to the 2022 national championship. The Orange play their home games at SU Soccer Stadium in Syracuse, New York, and compete in the Atlantic Coast Conference (ACC).

Syracuse was picked to finish tenth in the ACC preseason coaches' poll. After the Orange's forwards combined for just three goals and one assist in 2025, McIntyre added strikers Jordan Grey, Pedro Gulli and Dakota Jonke in the offseason. Syracuse opened with a 2–1 win at twenty-fourth-ranked UConn, then lost its home opener 3–2 to New Hampshire after playing 80 minutes with ten men following a red card to Gabriel Oksanen. A 4–0 win over Iona gave the Orange their best start since 2023, and a 5–0 win over St. John's was their largest margin of victory since 2023. Syracuse lost its first two ACC matches, to eighteenth-ranked Clemson and at Boston College, and beat Le Moyne 2–0 in the Salt City Derby for its first win over its crosstown rival since Le Moyne moved to Division I. On September 25, Ivan Irinimbabazi scored the only goal in a 1–0 upset at tenth-ranked Notre Dame, Syracuse's first road win over the Fighting Irish since 2015. After a 1–1 draw with tenth-ranked Pittsburgh, the Orange entered the United Soccer Coaches poll at No. 25 on October 6, their first appearance in the poll since September 2024. They lost that night 2–1 at twelfth-ranked Akron on an 86th-minute goal, then fell 1–0 to Louisville and dropped out of the poll.

Syracuse finished the regular season 7–7–2 and 1–5–2 in ACC play after a 2–1 loss at Virginia Tech, earning the thirteenth seed in the ACC Tournament. In the first round, the Orange drew 1–1 with fourth-seeded Pittsburgh through two overtime periods and won the penalty shootout 7–6, with Jonke scoring the deciding kick. Syracuse will face twelfth-seeded Stanford in the quarterfinals. Bryson Rodriguez leads the team with six goals.

== Previous season ==
The Orange finished the 2025 season 9–8–3. As the sixth seed in the ACC Tournament, Syracuse defeated Virginia Tech and upset third-seeded NC State 3–0 to reach the semifinals for the first time since winning the conference in 2022, where it lost 5–1 to SMU. Syracuse received an at-large bid to the NCAA Tournament and lost 2–0 at home to Hofstra in the first round. Goalkeeper Tomas Hut, an All-ACC Third Team selection, was drafted 21st overall by the New York Red Bulls in the 2026 MLS SuperDraft.

== Player movement ==
=== Players leaving ===
Departures
Name	Number	Pos.	Height	Year	Hometown	Reason for Departure
Ernest Mensah Jr.	3	DF	—	Senior	Naperville, Illinois	Graduated
Tim Brdaric	4	DF	—	Graduate Student	Düsseldorf, Germany	Graduated
Quentin Christey	8	MF	—	Freshman	Vaughan, Ontario	Transferred to Tulsa
Bright Nutornutsi	9	FW	—	Senior	Accra, Ghana	Graduated
Carlos Zambrano	10	MF	—	Senior	Miami, Florida	Graduated
Gavin Wigg	12	DF	—	Graduate Student	Columbus, Ohio	Graduated
Emanuel Cappello	15	FW	—	Freshman	Markham, Ontario	Transferred to Jacksonville
Faris Ibraheem	16	DF	—	Freshman	Brampton, Ontario	—
Giona Leibold	17	MF	—	Graduate Student	Wiesbaden, Germany	Graduated
Callum Lugton	18	FW	—	Freshman	Portland, Oregon	Transferred to Washington
Michael Acquah	19	FW	—	Senior	Awutu Bereku, Ghana	Graduated
Tim Noeding	20	MF	—	Graduate Student	Bad Hersfeld, Germany	Graduated
Tomas Hut	25	GK	—	Graduate Student	Nutley, New Jersey	Graduated; drafted by New York Red Bulls
Santiago Frias	33	DF	—	Graduate Student	Oakville, Ontario	Graduated

=== Players arriving ===
==== Incoming transfers ====
Incoming transfers
Name	Number	Pos.	Height	Year	Hometown	Previous School
Buster Honeywood	4	DF	—	Graduate Student	Kessingland, England	Bellevue
Dominic Bell	5	DF	—	Junior	Orlando, Florida	—
Jackson Miller	8	MF	—	Graduate Student	San Diego, California	Cal Poly
Pedro Gulli	9	FW	—	Graduate Student	Montreal, Quebec	McGill
Guesly Alexandre	10	MF	—	Sophomore	Montreal, Quebec	Iowa Western CC
Dakota Jonke	14	FW	—	Graduate Student	Cleveland, Ohio	—
Jordan Grey	18	FW	—	Sophomore	Ajax, Ontario	Toronto
Kameron Kist	21	MF	—	Graduate Student	New Albany, Ohio	Loyola Chicago
Quinn Olcott	29	MF	—	Junior	Fayetteville, New York	—

==== Recruiting class ====
Name	Nat.	Hometown	Club
Badr Laghjibi; MF	USA	Reston, Virginia	—
Dario White; FW	USA	Portland, Oregon	—
Emmanuel Cophy; DF	CAN	Montreal, Quebec	—
Gabriel Oksanen; DF	USA	San Diego, California	—
Grayson Lamb; GK	USA	Portland, Oregon	—
Reggie Gainer; MF	USA	Washington, D.C.	—

== Squad ==
=== Roster ===
As of November 6, 2026

Note: Flags indicate national team as defined under FIFA eligibility rules; some limited exceptions apply. Players may hold more than one non-FIFA nationality.

No.	Pos.	Nation	Player
1	GK	USA	Kyle Jansen
2	DF	CAN	Chimere Omeze
3	DF	USA	Gabriel Oksanen
4	DF	ENG	Buster Honeywood
5	DF	USA	Dominic Bell
6	MF	UGA	Ivan Irinimbabazi
7	MF	USA	Nathan Scott
8	MF	USA	Jackson Miller
9	FW	CAN	Pedro Gulli
10	MF	CAN	Guesly Alexandre
11	MF	CRC	Bryson Rodriguez
12	FW	USA	Dario White
14	FW	USA	Dakota Jonke
15	DF	CAN	Emmanuel Cophy

No.	Pos.	Nation	Player
16	MF	USA	Reggie Gainer
17	MF	USA	Landon Darko
18	FW	CAN	Jordan Grey
19	MF	USA	Badr Laghjibi
21	MF	USA	Kameron Kist
22	MF	MOZ	Kelvin Da Costa
23	DF	CAN	Pablo Patrick-Galvez
24	MF	BER	Sachiel Ming
25	GK	USA	Grayson Lamb
26	MF	CAN	Kristjan Fortier
27	DF	USA	Garrett Holman
29	MF	USA	Quinn Olcott
40	GK	USA	Juan Martinez-Bastidas

=== Team management ===
Position	Staff
Head coach	Ian McIntyre
Associate head coach	Jukka Masalin
Assistant coach	Matty Evans

== Schedule ==
Date Time, TV	Rank^{#}	Opponent^{#}	Result	Record	Site (Attendance) City, State
Regular season
August 20*; 5:00 p.m., UConn+		at No. 24 UConn	W 2–1	1–0–0	Joseph J. Morrone Stadium (1,547); Storrs, CT
August 23*; 5:00 p.m., ACCNX		New Hampshire	L 2–3	1–1–0	SU Soccer Stadium (2,144); Syracuse, NY
August 28*; 7:00 p.m., ACCNX		Loyola (MD)	W 2–0	2–1–0	SU Soccer Stadium (1,941); Syracuse, NY
August 31*; 7:00 p.m., ACCNX		Iona	W 4–0	3–1–0	SU Soccer Stadium (1,244); Syracuse, NY
September 4; 7:00 p.m., ACCNX		No. 18 Clemson	L 0–1	3–2–0 (0–1–0)	SU Soccer Stadium (2,531); Syracuse, NY
September 9*; 7:00 p.m., ACCNX		St. John's	W 5–0	4–2–0	SU Soccer Stadium (203); Syracuse, NY
September 12; 7:00 p.m., ACCNX		at Boston College	L 0–2	4–3–0 (0–2–0)	Newton Campus Field (695); Chestnut Hill, MA
September 15*; 7:00 p.m., ESPN+		at Colgate	W 3–0	5–3–0	Beyer-Small '76 Field (503); Hamilton, NY
September 19*; 7:00 p.m., ACCNX		Le Moyne; Salt City Derby	W 2–0	6–3–0	SU Soccer Stadium (2,064); Syracuse, NY
September 25; 7:00 p.m., ACCNX		at No. 10 Notre Dame	W 1–0	7–3–0 (1–2–0)	Alumni Stadium (1,237); Notre Dame, IN
October 2; 7:00 p.m., ACCNX		No. 10 Pittsburgh	T 1–1	7–3–1 (1–2–1)	SU Soccer Stadium (1,631); Syracuse, NY
October 6*; 7:00 p.m., ESPN+	No. 25	at No. 12 Akron	L 1–2	7–4–1	FirstEnergy Stadium (874); Akron, OH
October 10; 7:00 p.m., ACCNX	No. 25	No. 11 Louisville	L 0–1	7–5–1 (1–3–1)	SU Soccer Stadium (1,267); Syracuse, NY
October 17; 7:00 p.m., ACCNX		at No. 23 Wake Forest	L 0–2	7–6–1 (1–4–1)	Spry Stadium (2,296); Winston-Salem, NC
October 24; 1:00 p.m., ACCNX		Virginia; Senior Day	T 1–1	7–6–2 (1–4–2)	SU Soccer Stadium (1,632); Syracuse, NY
October 30; 5:00 p.m., ACCNX		at Virginia Tech	L 1–2	7–7–2 (1–5–2)	Thompson Field (622); Blacksburg, VA
ACC Tournament
November 4*; 7:00 p.m., ACCNX	(13)	at (4) No. 20 Pittsburgh; First round	T 1–1 ^{2OT, 7–6 pen.}	7–7–3	Ambrose Urbanic Field (476); Pittsburgh, PA
November 8*; 6:00 p.m., ACCNX	(13)	at (12) Stanford; Quarterfinals			Maloney Field at Cagan Stadium; Stanford, CA
*Non-conference game. ^{#}Rankings from United Soccer Coaches. (#) Tournament seedings in parentheses. All times are in Eastern.

== Goals record ==
Through November 4, 2026.

Rank	No.	Nat.	Po.	Name	Regular season	ACC Tournament	NCAA Tournament	Total
1	11	(Costa Rica)	MF	Bryson Rodriguez	5	1	0	6
2	9	(Canada)	FW	Pedro Gulli	4	0	0	4
3	26	(Canada)	MF	Kristjan Fortier	3	0	0	3
4	3	(United States)	DF	Gabriel Oksanen	2	0	0	2
4	14	(United States)	FW	Dakota Jonke	2	0	0	2
4	17	(United States)	MF	Landon Darko	2	0	0	2
4	18	(Canada)	FW	Jordan Grey	2	0	0	2
8	2	(Canada)	DF	Chimere Omeze	1	0	0	1
8	4	(England)	DF	Buster Honeywood	1	0	0	1
8	6	(Uganda)	MF	Ivan Irinimbabazi	1	0	0	1
8	22	(Mozambique)	MF	Kelvin Da Costa	1	0	0	1
8	24	(Bermuda)	MF	Sachiel Ming	1	0	0	1
Total					25	1	0	26

== Disciplinary record ==
Through November 4, 2026.

Rank	No.	Nat.	Po.	Name	Regular Season			ACC Tournament			NCAA Tournament			Total		
Rank	No.	Nat.	Po.	Name	Yellow card	(yellow card) (yellow-red card)	Red card	Yellow card	(yellow card) (yellow-red card)	Red card	Yellow card	(yellow card) (yellow-red card)	Red card	Yellow card	(yellow card) (yellow-red card)	Red card
1	22	(Mozambique)	MF	Kelvin Da Costa	4	0	0	0	0	0	0	0	0	4	0	0
2	6	(Uganda)	MF	Ivan Irinimbabazi	3	0	0	0	0	0	0	0	0	3	0	0
3	3	(United States)	DF	Gabriel Oksanen	1	0	1	0	0	0	0	0	0	1	0	1
4	7	(United States)	MF	Nathan Scott	2	0	0	0	0	0	0	0	0	2	0	0
4	24	(Bermuda)	MF	Sachiel Ming	2	0	0	0	0	0	0	0	0	2	0	0
6	1	(United States)	GK	Kyle Jansen	1	0	0	0	0	0	0	0	0	1	0	0
6	2	(Canada)	DF	Chimere Omeze	1	0	0	0	0	0	0	0	0	1	0	0
6	8	(United States)	MF	Jackson Miller	1	0	0	0	0	0	0	0	0	1	0	0
6	17	(United States)	MF	Landon Darko	1	0	0	0	0	0	0	0	0	1	0	0
6	18	(Canada)	FW	Jordan Grey	1	0	0	0	0	0	0	0	0	1	0	0
6	19	(United States)	MF	Badr Laghjibi	1	0	0	0	0	0	0	0	0	1	0	0
6	21	(United States)	MF	Kameron Kist	1	0	0	0	0	0	0	0	0	1	0	0
6	26	(Canada)	MF	Kristjan Fortier	1	0	0	0	0	0	0	0	0	1	0	0
6	27	(United States)	DF	Garrett Holman	0	0	0	1	0	0	0	0	0	1	0	0
Total					20	0	1	1	0	0	0	0	0	21	0	1

== Awards and honors ==
Recipient	Award	Date	Ref.
Kelvin Da Costa	ACC Preseason Watch List	August 12	

== Rankings ==
Ranking movements Legend: ██ Increase in ranking ██ Decrease in ranking — = Not ranked RV = Received votes
	Week																
Poll	Pre	1	2	3	4	5	6	7	8	9	10	11	12	13	14	15	Final
United Soccer	—	—	—	—	—	—	RV	25	—	—	—	—		Not released			
TopDrawer Soccer	—	—	—	—	—	—	—	19	14	—	—	—	—				
College Soccer News	—	—	—	—	—	—	RV	RV	—	—	—	—			Not released		
