= 2026 Stanford Cardinal men's soccer team =

American college soccer season

2026 Stanford Cardinal men's soccer
- Conference: Atlantic Coast Conference
- Record: 9–4–3 (1–4–3 ACC)
- Head coach: Jeremy Gunn (15th season)
- Assistant coaches: Drew Hutchins; Woo Jeon; Kevin McCarthy
- Home stadium: Maloney Field at Laird Q. Cagan Stadium

2026 ACC men's soccer standings
	Conf.					Overall
Team	W		L		T	W		L		T
No. 1 SMU †	6	–	0	–	2	13	–	0	–	3
No. 5 Clemson	6	–	1	–	1	13	–	3	–	2
No. 20 Wake Forest	5	–	3	–	0	11	–	5	–	3
No. 13 Louisville	4	–	2	–	2	12	–	3	–	3
No. 21 Pittsburgh	4	–	2	–	2	9	–	4	–	4
Virginia Tech	4	–	2	–	2	8	–	6	–	3
No. 12 North Carolina	3	–	1	–	4	9	–	2	–	6
Notre Dame	4	–	4	–	0	7	–	5	–	4
Virginia	3	–	3	–	2	7	–	7	–	4
California	2	–	4	–	2	6	–	5	–	5
NC State	1	–	3	–	4	7	–	5	–	6
Stanford	1	–	4	–	3	9	–	5	–	3
Syracuse	1	–	5	–	2	8	–	7	–	3
Boston College	1	–	6	–	1	6	–	6	–	4
Duke	1	–	6	–	1	7	–	10	–	1
† – Conference champion ‡ – ACC tournament champion + – At-large invitation to the 2026 NCAA tournament; As of November 8, 2026; Rankings from United Soccer Coaches; Source:The ACC

The 2026 Stanford Cardinal men's soccer team represents Stanford University during the 2026 NCAA Division I men's soccer season. The Cardinal are led by head coach Jeremy Gunn, in his fifteenth season. They play their home games at Maloney Field at Laird Q. Cagan Stadium in Stanford, California. This is the team's third season in the Atlantic Coast Conference.

Stanford began the season ranked ninth nationally and was picked second in the ACC Preseason Coaches Poll. The Cardinal won their first six matches, rising to first in the rankings after the opening week and beating second-ranked San Diego 1–0 in a meeting of the nation's top two teams. They spent four weeks at number one. Freshman Jayden Fitzgerald Boes scored a hat-trick against CSUN, the program's first since 2012, and was named ACC Offensive Player of the Week. After a 2–2 draw at North Carolina in their ACC opener, home losses to Notre Dame, which ended a sixteen-match regular season winning streak, and Virginia dropped Stanford to sixth and then fourteenth in the rankings. The Cardinal earned their first conference win at Duke on October 2, scoring twice in 37 seconds to erase a two-goal deficit. A 3–2 home loss to fifth-ranked Clemson, in which Logan Tsopanoglou was sent off, was followed by a scoreless draw at top-ranked SMU.

The Cardinal finished the regular season 8–4–3 and 1–4–3 in ACC play, and entered the ACC Tournament as the twelfth seed. In the First Round, Fitzgerald Boes scored in the 89th minute to give Stanford a 2–1 win at fifth seed and eighth-ranked Louisville. Stanford will host thirteenth seed Syracuse in the Quarterfinals. Fitzgerald Boes leads the team with seven goals.

== Background ==
The Cardinal finished the 2025 season 14–4–2 overall and 5–2–1 in ACC play. They spent five weeks ranked first nationally. In the ACC Tournament, Stanford came from behind to defeat fifteenth seed Boston College 4–2 in the First Round before losing 1–0 to SMU in the Quarterfinals. In the NCAA Tournament, the Cardinal defeated Kansas City 1–0 in the Second Round and lost 1–0 to Washington in the Third Round, their fourth consecutive appearance in the Third Round. Following the season, Will Cleary was selected 22nd overall by Charlotte FC and Palmer Bank 35th overall by the LA Galaxy in the 2026 MLS SuperDraft.

== Player movement ==
=== Players leaving ===
Departures
Name	Number	Pos.	Height	Year	Hometown	Reason for Departure
Palmer Bank	3	DF	6'0"	Redshirt Junior	Bakersfield, California	Selected 35th overall in the 2026 MLS SuperDraft
Dylan Hooper	5	DF	6'1"	Redshirt Junior	Shawnee, Kansas	—
Fletcher Bank	7	MF	5'10"	Senior	Bakersfield, California	Graduated
Zach Bohane	10	MF	5'11"	Senior	Monte Sereno, California	Graduated
Alfonso Tenconi-Gradillas	11	DF	6'0"	Redshirt Junior	Virginia Water, England	—
Shane de Flores	13	FW	5'10"	Redshirt Senior	Danville, California	Graduated
Liam Doyle	14	FW	5'11"	Senior	Tokyo, Japan	Graduated
Will Cleary	15	MF	6'2"	Senior	Windsor, Connecticut	Selected 22nd overall in the 2026 MLS SuperDraft
Tomo Allen	17	FW	6'3"	Freshman	Danville, California	—
Duncan Jarvie	19	FW	6'2"	Junior	Lehi, Utah	—
Takashi Sasaki	29	DF	5'9"	Redshirt Junior	Issaquah, Washington	Transferred to Seattle
Laszlo Bollyky	33	GK	6'4"	Redshirt Junior	Stanford, California	—

=== Players arriving ===
==== Incoming transfers ====
Incoming transfers
Name	Number	Pos.	Height	Year	Hometown	Previous School
TJ Kahoalii	13	MF	5'10"	Junior	Whitman, Massachusetts	Louisville
Tim Logan	19	MF	5'9"	Sophomore	Florham Park, New Jersey	Georgetown

==== Recruiting class ====
Name	Nat.	Hometown	Club / High school
Jayden Fitzgerald Boes; FW	USA	Oakland, California	—
Hugo Berg; DF	USA	Chicago, Illinois	—
Maximo Nystrom; DF	USA	Portland, Oregon	—
Tim Fortier; MF	CAN	Toronto, Ontario	—
Alex Ling; DF	USA	Castro Valley, California	—
Logan Tsopanoglou; FW	USA	Maple Valley, Washington	—
Yujin Kikuchi; MF	JPN	Chiba, Japan	—
Calder Zirn; FW	USA	Woodside, California	—
Carson Sagely; FW	USA	Templeton, California	—
Bennett Ewing; GK	USA	Sandy, Utah	—

== Squad ==
=== Roster ===
As of November 6, 2026

Note: Flags indicate national team as defined under FIFA eligibility rules; some limited exceptions apply. Players may hold more than one non-FIFA nationality.

No.	Pos.	Nation	Player
1	GK	USA	Rowan Schnebly
2	MF	USA	Brad Bennett
4	DF	USA	Dylan Groeneveld
6	MF	USA	Joshua Partal
7	MF	USA	Jude Stone
8	MF	USA	Jack Pymm
9	FW	USA	Trevor Islam
10	MF	USA	Alex Chow
13	MF	USA	TJ Kahoalii
14	FW	USA	Jayden Fitzgerald Boes
15	DF	USA	Hugo Berg
16	DF	USA	Maximo Nystrom
17	MF	CAN	Tim Fortier
18	DF	USA	Alex Ling

No.	Pos.	Nation	Player
19	MF	USA	Tim Logan
20	FW	USA	Logan Tsopanoglou
21	MF	USA	Dillon Logan
22	MF	JPN	Yujin Kikuchi
23	DF	USA	Victor Fung
24	DF	USA	Aidan Reilly
25	DF	USA	Joe Moyer
26	FW	USA	Calder Zirn
28	FW	USA	Eric Frintu
29	FW	USA	Carson Sagely
30	GK	USA	Jordan Victor
31	GK	USA	Bennett Ewing
32	GK	USA	Brayden Montague

=== Team management ===
Position	Staff
Head coach (Knowles Family Director of Men's Soccer)	Jeremy Gunn
Associate head coach	Drew Hutchins
Assistant coach	Woo Jeon
Assistant coach	Kevin McCarthy

== Schedule ==
Date Time, TV	Rank^{#}	Opponent^{#}	Result	Record	Site (Attendance) City, State
Regular season
August 20*; 7:30 p.m.	No. 9	No. 21 Grand Canyon	W 2–1	1–0–0	Cagan Stadium (627); Stanford, CA
August 23*; 7:00 p.m.	No. 9	Denver	W 3–1	2–0–0	Cagan Stadium (914); Stanford, CA
August 27*; 4:00 p.m.	No. 1	No. 2 San Diego	W 1–0	3–0–0	Cagan Stadium (1,118); Stanford, CA
August 30*; 7:00 p.m.	No. 1	UC Davis	W 2–1	4–0–0	Cagan Stadium (924); Stanford, CA
September 4*; 7:00 p.m.	No. 1	at San Jose State	W 1–0	5–0–0	Spartan Soccer Field (1,345); San Jose, CA
September 7*; 4:00 p.m.	No. 1	CSUN	W 4–0	6–0–0	Cagan Stadium (1,418); Stanford, CA
September 11; 4:00 p.m., ACCNX	No. 1	at North Carolina	T 2–2	6–0–1 (0–0–1)	Dorrance Field (2,031); Chapel Hill, NC
September 15*; 7:00 p.m.	No. 1	Santa Clara	W 1–0	7–0–1	Cagan Stadium (947); Stanford, CA
September 20; 7:00 p.m.	No. 1	No. 20 Notre Dame	L 1–3	7–1–1 (0–1–1)	Cagan Stadium (1,637); Stanford, CA
September 25; 7:00 p.m.	No. 6	Virginia	L 2–3	7–2–1 (0–2–1)	Cagan Stadium (1,672); Stanford, CA
October 2; 4:00 p.m.	No. 14	at Duke	W 3–2	8–2–1 (1–2–1)	Koskinen Stadium (887); Durham, NC
October 11; 6:00 p.m.	No. 13	No. 5 Clemson	L 2–3	8–3–1 (1–3–1)	Cagan Stadium (1,989); Stanford, CA
October 16; 3:00 p.m.	No. 25	at No. 1 SMU	T 0–0	8–3–2 (1–3–2)	Washburne Stadium (2,056); Dallas, TX
October 24; 3:00 p.m.		at NC State	T 1–1	8–3–3 (1–3–3)	Dail Soccer Field (1,354); Raleigh, NC
October 30; 6:00 p.m., ACCNX		California; Big Clasico	L 1–3	8–4–3 (1–4–3)	Cagan Stadium (2,103); Stanford, CA
ACC Tournament
November 4*; 3:00 p.m., ACCNX	(12)	at (5) No. 8 Louisville; First Round	W 2–1	9–4–3	Lynn Stadium (854); Louisville, KY
November 8*; 3:00 p.m., ACCNX	(12)	(13) Syracuse; Quarterfinals			Cagan Stadium; Stanford, CA
*Non-conference game. ^{#}Rankings from United Soccer Coaches. (#) Tournament seedings in parentheses. All times are in Pacific.

== Goals record ==
Through November 4, 2026.

Rank	No.	Nat.	Po.	Name	Regular season	ACC Tournament	NCAA Tournament	Total
1	14	(United States)	FW	Jayden Fitzgerald Boes	6	1	0	7
2	8	(United States)	MF	Jack Pymm	6	0	0	6
3	20	(United States)	FW	Logan Tsopanoglou	5	0	0	5
4	10	(United States)	MF	Alex Chow	3	0	0	3
5	26	(United States)	FW	Calder Zirn	2	0	0	2
6	6	(United States)	MF	Joshua Partal	1	0	0	1
6	22	(Japan)	MF	Yujin Kikuchi	1	0	0	1
6	23	(United States)	DF	Victor Fung	0	1	0	1
6	28	(United States)	FW	Eric Frintu	1	0	0	1
Own goals					1	0	0	1
Total					26	2	0	28

== Disciplinary record ==
Through November 4, 2026. Does not include four cautions issued to the Stanford bench.

Rank	No.	Nat.	Po.	Name	Regular Season			ACC Tournament			NCAA Tournament			Total		
Rank	No.	Nat.	Po.	Name	Yellow card	(yellow card) (yellow-red card)	Red card	Yellow card	(yellow card) (yellow-red card)	Red card	Yellow card	(yellow card) (yellow-red card)	Red card	Yellow card	(yellow card) (yellow-red card)	Red card
1	4	(United States)	DF	Dylan Groeneveld	6	0	0	0	0	0	0	0	0	6	0	0
2	8	(United States)	MF	Jack Pymm	5	0	0	0	0	0	0	0	0	5	0	0
3	9	(United States)	FW	Trevor Islam	4	0	0	0	0	0	0	0	0	4	0	0
3	17	(Canada)	MF	Tim Fortier	4	0	0	0	0	0	0	0	0	4	0	0
5	15	(United States)	DF	Hugo Berg	3	0	0	0	0	0	0	0	0	3	0	0
5	22	(Japan)	MF	Yujin Kikuchi	2	0	0	1	0	0	0	0	0	3	0	0
5	25	(United States)	DF	Joe Moyer	3	0	0	0	0	0	0	0	0	3	0	0
8	20	(United States)	FW	Logan Tsopanoglou	1	0	1	0	0	0	0	0	0	1	0	1
9	23	(United States)	DF	Victor Fung	2	0	0	0	0	0	0	0	0	2	0	0
9	24	(United States)	DF	Aidan Reilly	2	0	0	0	0	0	0	0	0	2	0	0
11	19	(United States)	MF	Tim Logan	0	0	1	0	0	0	0	0	0	0	0	1
12	1	(United States)	GK	Rowan Schnebly	1	0	0	0	0	0	0	0	0	1	0	0
12	6	(United States)	MF	Joshua Partal	1	0	0	0	0	0	0	0	0	1	0	0
12	7	(United States)	MF	Jude Stone	1	0	0	0	0	0	0	0	0	1	0	0
12	10	(United States)	MF	Alex Chow	0	0	0	1	0	0	0	0	0	1	0	0
12	14	(United States)	FW	Jayden Fitzgerald Boes	1	0	0	0	0	0	0	0	0	1	0	0
12	16	(United States)	DF	Maximo Nystrom	1	0	0	0	0	0	0	0	0	1	0	0
12	26	(United States)	FW	Calder Zirn	1	0	0	0	0	0	0	0	0	1	0	0
Total					38	0	2	2	0	0	0	0	0	40	0	2

== Awards and honors ==
Recipient	Award	Date	Ref.
Dylan Groeneveld	Preseason All-ACC Watchlist	August 12	
Jayden Fitzgerald Boes	ACC Offensive Player of the Week	September 15	

== Rankings ==
Ranking movements Legend: ██ Increase in ranking ██ Decrease in ranking — = Not ranked RV = Received votes
	Week																
Poll	Pre	1	2	3	4	5	6	7	8	9	10	11	12	13	14	15	Final
United Soccer	9	1	1	1	1	6	14	13	25	RV	RV	—		Not released			
TopDrawer Soccer	10	10	8	1	1	3	10	16	10	10	10	16	—				
College Soccer News	8	1	1	1	1	1	8	13	15	20	21	RV			Not released		
