= 2026 Duke Blue Devils men's soccer team =

American college soccer season

2026 Duke Blue Devils men's soccer
- Conference: Atlantic Coast Conference
- Record: 7–10–1 (1–6–1 ACC)
- Head coach: John Kerr (19th season)
- Assistant coaches: Michael Brady; Kyle Johnston; Tristan Wierbonski
- Home stadium: Koskinen Stadium

2026 ACC men's soccer standings
	Conf.					Overall
Team	W		L		T	W		L		T
No. 2 SMU †	6	–	0	–	2	12	–	0	–	3
No. 3 Clemson	6	–	1	–	1	12	–	2	–	2
No. 15 Wake Forest	5	–	3	–	0	11	–	4	–	2
No. 20 Pittsburgh	4	–	2	–	2	9	–	4	–	3
No. 8 Louisville	4	–	2	–	2	12	–	2	–	3
Virginia Tech	4	–	2	–	2	8	–	5	–	3
No. 17 North Carolina	3	–	1	–	4	8	–	2	–	5
Notre Dame	4	–	4	–	0	7	–	5	–	3
Virginia	3	–	3	–	2	7	–	6	–	3
California	2	–	4	–	2	6	–	5	–	4
NC State	1	–	3	–	4	5	–	5	–	6
Stanford	1	–	4	–	3	8	–	4	–	3
Syracuse	1	–	5	–	2	7	–	7	–	2
Boston College	1	–	6	–	1	6	–	6	–	3
Duke	1	–	6	–	1	7	–	9	–	1
† – Conference champion ‡ – ACC tournament champion + – At-large invitation to the 2026 NCAA tournament; As of November 3, 2026; Rankings from United Soccer Coaches; Source:The ACC

The 2026 Duke Blue Devils men's soccer team represented Duke University during the 2026 NCAA Division I men's soccer season. The Blue Devils were led by head coach John Kerr, in his nineteenth season. They played their home games at Koskinen Stadium in Durham, North Carolina, as members of the Atlantic Coast Conference.

Having lost several starters to graduation, Duke entered the season with a 28-man roster that included nine freshmen, and was picked seventh in the ACC Preseason Coaches Poll. The Blue Devils opened with wins over Seton Hall and California Baptist and entered the United Soccer Coaches rankings at nineteenth, but a 4–3 home loss to Furman began a run of four straight defeats. The streak included a 6–1 loss at Wake Forest in the ACC opener, and senior captain Ulfur Bjornsson was injured against NC State and missed nine matches. Freshmen Jack Ottley and Ethan Congleton carried the attack in his absence. Duke lost its first five conference matches, including a 6–0 defeat at top-ranked SMU, before earning its first ACC win with a 3–0 victory over Virginia on October 16. Ottley was named ACC Co-Offensive Player of the Week for his performances against Virginia and Greensboro, and the Blue Devils followed with a 2–2 draw against sixteenth-ranked North Carolina.

The Blue Devils finished the regular season 7–9–1 and 1–6–1 in ACC play, last in the conference. As the fifteenth seed in the ACC Tournament, they trailed 2–0 at halftime and pulled a goal back through Nikolai Bull Jorgensen, but lost 2–1 at second seed Clemson in the First Round, ending their season at 7–10–1. Congleton led the team with eight goals, while Ottley added seven goals and a team-high seven assists.

== Background ==
The Blue Devils began the 2025 season with a twelve-match unbeaten run and finished the regular season with a win at North Carolina. As the host in the First Round of the ACC Tournament, they lost 2–0 to California. Duke received a bid to the NCAA Tournament, where it defeated Fairleigh Dickinson at home in the First Round and upset third-ranked Princeton on the road in the Second Round, before losing 2–0 at fourteenth-ranked Akron in the Third Round. It was Duke's deepest NCAA Tournament run since 2022, and the team finished 10–4–6 overall and 4–2–2 in ACC play. Kenan Hot was named to the All-ACC First Team, Kamran Acito and Ulfur Bjornsson to the Second Team, and Drew Kerr to the Third Team.

== Player movement ==
=== Players leaving ===
Departures
Name	Number	Pos.	Height	Year	Hometown	Reason for Departure
Ryan Gallagher	0	GK	6'1"	Graduate Student	Tampa, Florida	Graduated
Eryk Dymora	1	GK	6'3"	Redshirt Senior	Clifton, New Jersey	Graduated
Kamran Acito	3	DF	6'3"	Senior	Manhattan, New York	Graduated
Trevor Burns	4	MF	5'8"	Graduate Student	Kansas City, Missouri	Graduated
Alex Hauschild	5	DF	6'2"	Sophomore	Greenwich, Connecticut	—
Aleksandar Vukovic	6	DF	6'4"	Graduate Student	Nova Pazova, Serbia	Graduated
Alessandro Arlotti	7	MF	6'0"	Graduate Student	Sanremo, Italy	Graduated
Drew Kerr	10	MF	6'0"	Senior	Hillsborough, North Carolina	Graduated
Leonardo D'Ambrosio	11	MF	6'0"	Graduate Student	Turin, Italy	Graduated
Jose Ortega	13	FW	5'11"	Senior	Bethesda, Maryland	Graduated
Caleb Donaldson	22	MF	5'9"	Junior	Nashville, Tennessee	—
Kenan Hot	23	MF	5'11"	Senior	Lincroft, New Jersey	Graduated
Axel Gudbjornsson	24	DF	6'4"	Senior	Reykjavík, Iceland	Graduated
Jackson Lagos	32	MF	5'11"	Senior	Minneapolis, Minnesota	Graduated

=== Players arriving ===
==== Incoming transfers ====
Incoming transfers
Name	Number	Pos.	Height	Year	Hometown	Previous School
Colin Gallagher	0	GK	6'1"	Graduate Student	Safety Harbor, Florida	Virginia
Jonah Wolf	6	MF	6'1"	Junior	Benndorf, Germany	Saint Francis
Emmanuel Frimpong	22	MF	6'0"	Sophomore	Kumasi, Ghana	Pacific

==== Recruiting class ====
Name	Nat.	Hometown	Club / Academy
Max Deisenhofer; GK	USA	Brush Prairie, Washington	Portland Timbers Academy
Max Steelman; FW	USA	San Diego, California	LA Galaxy Academy
Jack Ottley; FW	USA	Chesapeake, Virginia	Real Salt Lake Academy
Yuto Ueno; MF	JPN	Tokyo, Japan	Royal Russell School
Logan Moniz; MF	USA	Freetown, Massachusetts	FC Greater Boston Bolts
Kai Aina; FW	USA	San Jose, California	LA Galaxy Academy
Taisei Kwon; MF	JPN	Tokyo, Japan	Yokogawa Musashino FC
Ethan Congleton; FW	USA	Nantucket, Massachusetts	IMG Academy
Josh Poulson; DF	USA	Boston, Massachusetts	New England Revolution Academy

== Squad ==
=== Roster ===
As of November 6, 2026

Note: Flags indicate national team as defined under FIFA eligibility rules; some limited exceptions apply. Players may hold more than one non-FIFA nationality.

No.	Pos.	Nation	Player
0	GK	USA	Colin Gallagher
1	GK	USA	Max Deisenhofer
2	DF	USA	Jamie Kabuusu
3	DF	USA	Preston Zabinko
6	MF	GER	Jonah Wolf
7	FW	USA	Max Steelman
8	DF	NOR	Nikolai Bull Jorgensen
9	FW	ISL	Ulfur Bjornsson
10	MF	USA	Maxwell Simpson
11	FW	USA	Jack Ottley
12	MF	NOR	Thomas Vold
13	MF	JPN	Yuto Ueno
14	MF	USA	Logan Moniz
15	FW	NOR	Ari Racaj

No.	Pos.	Nation	Player
16	FW	USA	Kai Aina
17	FW	USA	Adrian Byasiima
18	MF	USA	Julius Suber
19	MF	USA	Ian Hecker
20	MF	JPN	Taisei Kwon
21	MF	ENG	Hugo Hill
22	MF	GHA	Emmanuel Frimpong
23	FW	USA	Ethan Congleton
24	DF	USA	Josh Poulson
25	MF	USA	Casey Bag
28	GK	USA	Jackson Blakeney
29	DF	USA	Tucker Smith
30	GK	USA	Nathan Gaviser
31	FW	ENG	Sol Arbib

=== Team management ===
Position	Staff
Head coach	John Kerr
Associate head coach	Michael Brady
Assistant coach	Kyle Johnston
Assistant coach	Tristan Wierbonski

== Schedule ==
Date Time, TV	Rank^{#}	Opponent^{#}	Result	Record	Site (Attendance) City, State
Regular season
August 20*; 8:00 p.m., ACCNX		Seton Hall	W 2–1	1–0–0	Koskinen Stadium (674); Durham, NC
August 23*; 3:30 p.m.		California Baptist	W 3–1	2–0–0	Koskinen Stadium; Durham, NC
August 27*; 7:00 p.m., ACCNX	No. 19	Furman	L 3–4	2–1–0	Koskinen Stadium (507); Durham, NC
August 30*; 6:00 p.m., ACCN	No. 19	No. 6 Georgetown	L 0–3	2–2–0	Koskinen Stadium (1,005); Durham, NC
September 5; 7:00 p.m., ACCNX		at Wake Forest	L 1–6	2–3–0 (0–1–0)	Spry Stadium (2,700); Winston-Salem, NC
September 10; 6:00 p.m., ACCNX		at NC State	L 1–3	2–4–0 (0–2–0)	Dail Soccer Field (2,244); Raleigh, NC
September 15*; 7:00 p.m., ACCNX		Queens	W 2–0	3–4–0	Koskinen Stadium (317); Durham, NC
September 18; 7:00 p.m., ACCNX		Virginia Tech	L 2–4	3–5–0 (0–3–0)	Koskinen Stadium (908); Durham, NC
September 22*; 7:00 p.m., ACCNX		Howard	W 3–1	4–5–0	Koskinen Stadium (185); Durham, NC
September 25*; 7:00 p.m., ACCNX		Elon	L 0–1	4–6–0	Koskinen Stadium (563); Durham, NC
October 2; 7:00 p.m., ACCNX		No. 14 Stanford	L 2–3	4–7–0 (0–4–0)	Koskinen Stadium (887); Durham, NC
October 6*; 7:00 p.m., ACCNX		Wofford	W 3–0	5–7–0	Koskinen Stadium (253); Durham, NC
October 10; 7:00 p.m., ACCNX		at No. 1 SMU	L 0–6	5–8–0 (0–5–0)	Washburne Stadium (2,243); Dallas, TX
October 13*; 7:00 p.m., ACCNX		Greensboro	W 2–0	6–8–0	Koskinen Stadium (374); Durham, NC
October 16; 7:00 p.m., ACCNX		Virginia	W 3–0	7–8–0 (1–5–0)	Koskinen Stadium (1,131); Durham, NC
October 23; 8:00 p.m., ACCN		No. 16 North Carolina; Rivalry	T 2–2	7–8–1 (1–5–1)	Koskinen Stadium (2,307); Durham, NC
October 30; 7:00 p.m., ACCNX		at Notre Dame	L 0–3	7–9–1 (1–6–1)	Alumni Stadium (579); South Bend, IN
ACC Tournament
November 4*; 7:00 p.m., ACCNX	(15)	at (2) No. 3 Clemson; First Round	L 1–2	7–10–1	Riggs Field (892); Clemson, SC
*Non-conference game. ^{#}Rankings from United Soccer Coaches. (#) Tournament seedings in parentheses. All times are in Eastern.

== Goals record ==
Final statistics.

Rank	No.	Nat.	Po.	Name	Regular season	ACC Tournament	NCAA Tournament	Total
1	23	(United States)	FW	Ethan Congleton	8	0	0	8
2	11	(United States)	FW	Jack Ottley	7	0	0	7
3	9	(Iceland)	FW	Ulfur Bjornsson	3	0	0	3
3	15	(Norway)	FW	Ari Racaj	3	0	0	3
3	31	(England)	FW	Sol Arbib	3	0	0	3
6	6	(Germany)	MF	Jonah Wolf	1	0	0	1
6	8	(Norway)	DF	Nikolai Bull Jorgensen	0	1	0	1
6	14	(United States)	MF	Logan Moniz	1	0	0	1
6	16	(United States)	FW	Kai Aina	1	0	0	1
6	18	(United States)	MF	Julius Suber	1	0	0	1
6	29	(United States)	DF	Tucker Smith	1	0	0	1
Total					29	1	0	30

== Disciplinary record ==
Final statistics.

Rank	No.	Nat.	Po.	Name	Regular Season			ACC Tournament			NCAA Tournament			Total		
Rank	No.	Nat.	Po.	Name	Yellow card	(yellow card) (yellow-red card)	Red card	Yellow card	(yellow card) (yellow-red card)	Red card	Yellow card	(yellow card) (yellow-red card)	Red card	Yellow card	(yellow card) (yellow-red card)	Red card
1	22	(Ghana)	MF	Emmanuel Frimpong	4	0	1	0	0	0	0	0	0	4	0	1
2	17	(United States)	FW	Adrian Byasiima	2	0	1	0	0	0	0	0	0	2	0	1
3	8	(Norway)	DF	Nikolai Bull Jorgensen	3	0	0	0	0	0	0	0	0	3	0	0
3	19	(United States)	MF	Ian Hecker	3	0	0	0	0	0	0	0	0	3	0	0
5	2	(United States)	DF	Jamie Kabuusu	2	0	0	0	0	0	0	0	0	2	0	0
5	11	(United States)	FW	Jack Ottley	2	0	0	0	0	0	0	0	0	2	0	0
5	14	(United States)	MF	Logan Moniz	2	0	0	0	0	0	0	0	0	2	0	0
8	29	(United States)	DF	Tucker Smith	0	0	0	0	0	1	0	0	0	0	0	1
9	6	(Germany)	MF	Jonah Wolf	1	0	0	0	0	0	0	0	0	1	0	0
9	7	(United States)	FW	Max Steelman	1	0	0	0	0	0	0	0	0	1	0	0
9	9	(Iceland)	FW	Ulfur Bjornsson	0	0	0	1	0	0	0	0	0	1	0	0
9	16	(United States)	FW	Kai Aina	1	0	0	0	0	0	0	0	0	1	0	0
9	18	(United States)	MF	Julius Suber	1	0	0	0	0	0	0	0	0	1	0	0
9	23	(United States)	FW	Ethan Congleton	1	0	0	0	0	0	0	0	0	1	0	0
9	24	(United States)	DF	Josh Poulson	1	0	0	0	0	0	0	0	0	1	0	0
9	31	(England)	FW	Sol Arbib	1	0	0	0	0	0	0	0	0	1	0	0
Total					25	0	2	1	0	1	0	0	0	26	0	3

== Awards and honors ==
Recipient	Award	Date	Ref.
Ulfur Bjornsson	Preseason All-ACC Watchlist	August 12	
Jack Ottley	ACC Co-Offensive Player of the Week	October 20	

== Rankings ==
Ranking movements Legend: ██ Increase in ranking ██ Decrease in ranking — = Not ranked RV = Received votes
	Week																
Poll	Pre	1	2	3	4	5	6	7	8	9	10	11	12	13	14	15	Final
United Soccer	RV	19	—	—	—	—	—	—	—	—	—	—		Not released			
TopDrawer Soccer	15	15	16	22	—	—	—	—	—	—	—	—	—				
College Soccer News	25	17	RV	—	—	—	—	—	—	—	—	—			Not released		
