= 2026 Boston College Eagles men's soccer team =

American college soccer season

2026 Boston College Eagles men's soccer
- Conference: Atlantic Coast Conference
- Record: 6–6–4 (1–6–1 ACC)
- Head coach: Francesco D'Agostino (1st season)
- Assistant coaches: Luke Perry; Braima Samati; Pedro Zampilli Ambrosio
- Home stadium: Newton Campus Soccer Field

2026 ACC men's soccer standings
	Conf.					Overall
Team	W		L		T	W		L		T
No. 2 SMU †	6	–	0	–	2	12	–	0	–	3
No. 3 Clemson	6	–	1	–	1	12	–	2	–	2
No. 15 Wake Forest	5	–	3	–	0	11	–	4	–	2
No. 20 Pittsburgh	4	–	2	–	2	9	–	4	–	3
No. 8 Louisville	4	–	2	–	2	12	–	2	–	3
Virginia Tech	4	–	2	–	2	8	–	5	–	3
No. 17 North Carolina	3	–	1	–	4	8	–	2	–	5
Notre Dame	4	–	4	–	0	7	–	5	–	3
Virginia	3	–	3	–	2	7	–	6	–	3
California	2	–	4	–	2	6	–	5	–	4
NC State	1	–	3	–	4	5	–	5	–	6
Stanford	1	–	4	–	3	8	–	4	–	3
Syracuse	1	–	5	–	2	7	–	7	–	2
Boston College	1	–	6	–	1	6	–	6	–	3
Duke	1	–	6	–	1	7	–	9	–	1
† – Conference champion ‡ – ACC tournament champion + – At-large invitation to the 2026 NCAA tournament; As of November 3, 2026; Rankings from United Soccer Coaches; Source:The ACC

The 2026 Boston College Eagles men's soccer team represented Boston College during the 2026 NCAA Division I men's soccer season. The Eagles were led by first-year head coach Francesco D'Agostino and played their home games at Newton Campus Soccer Field in Newton, Massachusetts. They competed in the Atlantic Coast Conference.

Head coach Bob Thompson stepped down on August 3, and associate head coach Francesco D'Agostino was named interim head coach. Picked to finish last in the ACC preseason poll, the Eagles won their first three matches and received votes in the United Soccer Coaches poll. After losing their ACC opener at Virginia, they beat Syracuse 2–0 for their first conference win of the season; a 2–1 win over New Haven two days later moved them to 5–1–1, their best start since 2021. The Eagles then drew fifteenth-ranked Louisville 3–3 on the road, the first match of a seven-game winless run that included five straight ACC losses. They closed the regular season with a 5–1 win over American International, in which Dylan Mafong scored his first career hat-trick.

The Eagles finished the regular season 6–6–3 overall and 1–6–1 in ACC play. As the fourteenth seed in the ACC Tournament, they drew third seed Wake Forest 1–1 in the First Round and were eliminated 6–5 on penalties, ending their season at 6–6–4. D'Agostino had the interim tag removed and was named head coach on October 22. Mafong led the team with eight goals.

== Background ==
The Eagles won one ACC match in 2025 and finished in the bottom three of the conference for the second consecutive season.

== Player movement ==
=== Players leaving ===
Departures
Name	Number	Pos.	Height	Weight	Year	Hometown	Reason for Departure
Patrick Donovan	1	GK	6'2"	190	Senior	Westport, Connecticut	Graduated
Patrick Reddy	2	FW	6'2"	185	Senior	Franklin Square, New York	Graduated
Ask Ekeland	7	MF	6'3"	190	Senior	Stavanger, Norway	Graduated
Ziad Abdul-Malak	8	MF	5'11"	180	Redshirt Senior	Manlius, New York	Graduated
Nikolai Rojel	9	FW	6'2"	190	Senior	Copenhagen, Denmark	Graduated
Sander Martinsen-Wold	10	MF	6'0"	176	Sophomore	Vestby, Norway	—
Marci Killeen	16	MF	6'2"	200	Redshirt Junior	Brea, California	Transferred to San Francisco
Max Andrews	18	DF	6'2"	202	Senior	Wilton, Connecticut	Graduated
Mitchell Shevchenko-Rogers	20	FW	5'11"	158	Freshman	Melbourne, Australia	—
Harald Race	21	—	6'1"	160	Sophomore	Moss, Norway	—
Erick Almendares	22	MF	5'10"	165	Senior	East Meadow, New York	Graduated
CJ Williams	25	DF	6'2"	183	Senior	Valley Stream, New York	Graduated
Aidan Farwell	32	—	6'0"	160	Graduate Student	Scituate, Massachusetts	Graduated
Johannes Hanken Tjostheim	77	FW	6'2"	185	Senior	Ålesund, Norway	Graduated

=== Players arriving ===
==== Incoming transfers ====
Incoming transfers
Name	Number	Pos.	Height	Weight	Year	Hometown	Previous School
Ismail Dia	5	DF	6'1"	185	Sophomore	Lausanne, Switzerland	Siena
Tin Vastic	70	FW	6'1"	185	Graduate Student	Split, Croatia	Palm Beach Atlantic

==== Recruiting class ====
Name	Nat.	Hometown	Club / High school
Isaac Bakwira; MF	UGA	Kampala, Uganda	Santa Barbara Soccer Club
Aiden Cauley; MF	USA	New York City	Regis High School
Jonah Funk; MF	GER	Wolfsburg, Germany	Eintracht Braunschweig U19
Aidan Horan; GK	USA	Burlingame, California	WSC Crush
Hudson Mbalire; FW	UGA	Mukono, Uganda	NEC FC
Mohamed Moustafa; DF	EGY	Cairo, Egypt	Al Ahly SC
Charlie Pons; MF	USA	Camden, Maine	Milton Academy
Jayson Quintanilla; MF	USA	Durham, North Carolina	North Carolina FC
Ryan Scuro; MF	USA	Haworth, New Jersey	New York Red Bulls
Andres Siso; FW	USA	Miami, Florida	American School of Madrid

== Squad ==
=== Roster ===
As of November 5, 2026

Note: Flags indicate national team as defined under FIFA eligibility rules; some limited exceptions apply. Players may hold more than one non-FIFA nationality.

No.	Pos.	Nation	Player
1	GK	SRB	Andrej Borak
3	DF	USA	Christian Bejar
4	DF	GER	Moritz Gundelach
5	DF	SUI	Ismail Dia
6	—	USA	Jack Burkhardt
7	FW	GHA	Michael Asare
8	MF	USA	Connor Gibson
9	FW	USA	Andres Siso
10	MF	USA	Dylan Mafong
13	GK	USA	Leo Seidel
14	MF	UGA	Isaac Bakwira
16	MF	USA	Bryan Toro
17	FW	USA	Russell Brown
18	—	USA	Alexi Karalis

No.	Pos.	Nation	Player
19	MF	USA	Aiden Cauley
20	MF	USA	Jayson Quintanilla
21	MF	USA	Ryan Scuro
22	MF	USA	Charlie Pons
23	DF	GER	Fynn Henze
24	DF	USA	Devon Galluzzo
26	DF	USA	Henry Wassarman
27	MF	GER	Jonah Funk
28	DF	USA	Watts Richmond
29	FW	UGA	Hudson Mbalire
32	DF	EGY	Mohamed Moustafa
33	GK	USA	Bryce Copeland-Del Toro
34	GK	USA	Aidan Horan
70	FW	CRO	Tin Vastic

=== Team management ===
Position	Staff
Head coach	Francesco D'Agostino
Associate head coach	Luke Perry
Assistant coach	Braima Samati
Director of operations / Goalkeeping coach	Pedro Zampilli Ambrosio

== Schedule ==
Date Time, TV	Rank^{#}	Opponent^{#}	Result	Record	Site (Attendance) City, State
Regular season
August 20*; 7:00 p.m.		Merrimack	W 4–0	1–0–0	Newton Campus Soccer Field (460); Newton, MA
August 23*; 5:00 p.m.		Siena	W 3–1	2–0–0	Newton Campus Soccer Field (172); Newton, MA
August 28*; 7:00 p.m.		Dartmouth	W 2–1	3–0–0	Newton Campus Soccer Field (803); Newton, MA
September 4; 6:00 p.m.		at Virginia	L 0–2	3–1–0 (0–1–0)	Klöckner Stadium (460); Charlottesville, VA
September 8*; 4:30 p.m.		St. Bonaventure	T 2–2	3–1–1	Newton Campus Soccer Field (121); Newton, MA
September 12; 7:00 p.m.		Syracuse	W 2–0	4–1–1 (1–1–0)	Newton Campus Soccer Field (695); Newton, MA
September 15*; 4:30 p.m.		New Haven	W 2–1	5–1–1	Newton Campus Soccer Field (114); Newton, MA
September 18; 6:00 p.m.		at No. 15 Louisville	T 3–3	5–1–2 (1–1–1)	Lynn Stadium (684); Louisville, KY
September 25; 7:00 p.m.		at No. 14 Clemson	L 0–4	5–2–2 (1–2–1)	Riggs Field (1,848); Clemson, SC
October 3; 3:00 p.m.		North Carolina	L 1–3	5–3–2 (1–3–1)	Newton Campus Soccer Field (784); Newton, MA
October 9; 7:00 p.m.		Wake Forest	L 1–2	5–4–2 (1–4–1)	Newton Campus Soccer Field (681); Newton, MA
October 13*; 7:00 p.m.		at Boston University	T 2–2	5–4–3	Nickerson Field (563); Boston, MA
October 17; 6:00 p.m.		at Notre Dame	L 0–2	5–5–3 (1–5–1)	Alumni Stadium (564); South Bend, IN
October 23; 7:00 p.m.		No. 17 Pittsburgh; Senior Night	L 0–2	5–6–3 (1–6–1)	Newton Campus Soccer Field (473); Newton, MA
October 28*; 3:30 p.m.		American International	W 5–1	6–6–3	Newton Campus Soccer Field (88); Newton, MA
ACC Tournament
November 4*; 6:00 p.m.	(14)	at (3) No. 15 Wake Forest; First Round	T 1–1 ^{(5–6 PK)}	6–6–4	Spry Stadium (822); Winston-Salem, NC
*Non-conference game. ^{#}Rankings from United Soccer Coaches. (#) Tournament seedings in parentheses. All times are in Eastern.

== Goals record ==
Final.

Rank	No.	Nat.	Po.	Name	Regular season	ACC Tournament	Total
1	10	(United States)	MF	Dylan Mafong	7	1	8
2	17	(United States)	FW	Russell Brown	5	0	5
3	7	(Ghana)	FW	Michael Asare	4	0	4
4	16	(United States)	MF	Bryan Toro	3	0	3
5	23	(Germany)	DF	Fynn Henze	2	0	2
6	5	(Switzerland)	DF	Ismail Dia	1	0	1
6	6	(United States)	—	Jack Burkhardt	1	0	1
6	8	(United States)	MF	Connor Gibson	1	0	1
6	18	(United States)	—	Alexi Karalis	1	0	1
6	20	(United States)	MF	Jayson Quintanilla	1	0	1
6	22	(United States)	MF	Charlie Pons	1	0	1
Total					27	1	28

== Disciplinary record ==
Final. Does not include one caution issued to the Boston College bench.

Rank	No.	Nat.	Po.	Name	Regular Season			ACC Tournament			Total		
Rank	No.	Nat.	Po.	Name	Yellow card	(yellow card) (yellow-red card)	Red card	Yellow card	(yellow card) (yellow-red card)	Red card	Yellow card	(yellow card) (yellow-red card)	Red card
1	17	(United States)	FW	Russell Brown	4	0	0	1	0	0	5	0	0
2	23	(Germany)	DF	Fynn Henze	4	0	0	0	0	0	4	0	0
3	4	(Germany)	DF	Moritz Gundelach	3	0	0	0	0	0	3	0	0
3	8	(United States)	MF	Connor Gibson	3	0	0	0	0	0	3	0	0
5	5	(Switzerland)	DF	Ismail Dia	2	0	0	0	0	0	2	0	0
5	16	(United States)	MF	Bryan Toro	2	0	0	0	0	0	2	0	0
5	21	(United States)	MF	Ryan Scuro	2	0	0	0	0	0	2	0	0
5	22	(United States)	MF	Charlie Pons	2	0	0	0	0	0	2	0	0
5	26	(United States)	DF	Henry Wassarman	1	0	0	1	0	0	2	0	0
5	70	(Croatia)	FW	Tin Vastic	2	0	0	0	0	0	2	0	0
11	1	(Serbia)	GK	Andrej Borak	1	0	0	0	0	0	1	0	0
11	3	(United States)	DF	Christian Bejar	1	0	0	0	0	0	1	0	0
11	6	(United States)	—	Jack Burkhardt	0	0	0	1	0	0	1	0	0
11	7	(Ghana)	FW	Michael Asare	1	0	0	0	0	0	1	0	0
11	10	(United States)	MF	Dylan Mafong	1	0	0	0	0	0	1	0	0
11	18	(United States)	—	Alexi Karalis	1	0	0	0	0	0	1	0	0
11	24	(United States)	DF	Devon Galluzzo	1	0	0	0	0	0	1	0	0
11	32	(Egypt)	DF	Mohamed Moustafa	1	0	0	0	0	0	1	0	0
Total					32	0	0	3	0	0	35	0	0

== Rankings ==
Ranking movements Legend: ██ Increase in ranking ██ Decrease in ranking — = Not ranked RV = Received votes
	Week																
Poll	Pre	1	2	3	4	5	6	7	8	9	10	11	12	13	14	15	Final
United Soccer	—	—	RV	—	—	RV	—	—	—	—	—	—		Not released			
TopDrawer Soccer	—	—	—	—	—	—	23	23	—	—	—	—	—				
College Soccer News	—	—	RV	—	—	RV	—	—	—	—	—	—			Not released		
