= 2026 ACC men's soccer tournament =

Soccer tournament

- Classification: Division I
- Teams: 15
- Matches: 14
- First round site: Campus Sites
- Quarterfinals site: Campus Sites
- Semifinals site: First Horizon Stadium; Cary, North Carolina
- Finals site: First Horizon Stadium; Cary, North Carolina
- Broadcast: ESPNU (Final), ACC Network

2026 ACC men's soccer standings
	Conf.					Overall
Team	W		L		T	W		L		T
No. 1 SMU †	6	–	0	–	2	13	–	0	–	3
No. 5 Clemson	6	–	1	–	1	13	–	3	–	2
No. 20 Wake Forest	5	–	3	–	0	11	–	5	–	3
No. 13 Louisville	4	–	2	–	2	12	–	3	–	3
No. 21 Pittsburgh	4	–	2	–	2	9	–	4	–	4
Virginia Tech	4	–	2	–	2	8	–	6	–	3
No. 12 North Carolina	3	–	1	–	4	9	–	2	–	6
Notre Dame	4	–	4	–	0	7	–	5	–	4
Virginia	3	–	3	–	2	7	–	7	–	4
California	2	–	4	–	2	6	–	5	–	5
NC State	1	–	3	–	4	7	–	5	–	6
Stanford	1	–	4	–	3	9	–	5	–	3
Syracuse	1	–	5	–	2	8	–	7	–	3
Boston College	1	–	6	–	1	6	–	6	–	4
Duke	1	–	6	–	1	7	–	10	–	1
† – Conference champion ‡ – ACC tournament champion + – At-large invitation to the 2026 NCAA tournament; As of November 8, 2026; Rankings from United Soccer Coaches; Source:The ACC

The 2026 ACC men's soccer tournament is the 40th edition of the ACC men's soccer tournament. The tournament will decide the Atlantic Coast Conference champion and guaranteed representative into the 2026 NCAA Division I men's soccer tournament. The tournament is being held from November 4 to November 15, 2026. The Semifinals and Final will be played at First Horizon Stadium in Cary, North Carolina and earlier rounds are played on campus sites.

SMU are the defending tournament champions, having defeated Virginia 1–0 in the 2025 final. SMU enter the tournament as the first seed after winning their first ACC regular-season title, and they are the only team in the nation yet to lose a match this season. They are attempting to become the first team to win back-to-back ACC tournaments since Wake Forest in 2016 and 2017.

Four of the seven First Round matches were won by the lower seed. Twelfth seed Stanford won 2–1 at fifth seed Louisville with a goal in the 89th minute, and eleventh seed NC State came from behind to win 2–1 at sixth seed Virginia Tech. Four matches were decided by penalty shoot-out: thirteenth seed Syracuse eliminated fourth seed Pittsburgh 7–6, and ninth seed Virginia defeated eighth seed Notre Dame 5–4, while third seed Wake Forest and seventh seed North Carolina advanced past Boston College and California, respectively. Second seed Clemson was the only higher seed to win in regulation, defeating fifteenth seed Duke 2–1.

== Qualification ==
All fifteen teams in the Atlantic Coast Conference earned a berth into the ACC Tournament. The First Round and Quarterfinals are hosted by the higher seeds. Seeding was determined by regular season conference record. The seeding for the tournament was determined on the final day of conference play, October 30. SMU earned the first seed and the tournament's only first-round bye, both for the first time. A tiebreaker was required to determine the fourth, fifth and sixth seeds as Pittsburgh, Louisville and Virginia Tech all finished with fourteen conference points and identical 4–2–2 records. Pittsburgh earned the fourth seed by virtue of defeating both teams during the regular season, beating Louisville 1–0 on September 25 and Virginia Tech 3–0 on October 9. Louisville and Virginia Tech did not play during conference play, so the second tiebreaker of goal difference in conference play was used. Louisville finished with a 0-goal difference and Virginia Tech finished with a -1 goal difference. Therefore, Louisville was the fifth seed and Virginia Tech was the sixth seed. A tiebreaker was also required to determine the fourteenth and fifteenth seeds as Boston College and Duke both finished with four points and 1–6–1 records. The two teams did not play during conference play, so goal difference in conference play was used. Boston College finished with a -11 goal difference and Duke finished with a -16 goal difference. Therefore, Boston College was the fourteenth seed and Duke was the fifteenth seed.

Seed	School	Conference Record	Points
1	SMU	6–0–2	20
2	Clemson	6–1–1	19
3	Wake Forest	5–3–0	15
4	Pittsburgh	4–2–2	14
5	Louisville	4–2–2	14
6	Virginia Tech	4–2–2	14
7	North Carolina	3–1–4	13
8	Notre Dame	4–4–0	12
9	Virginia	3–3–2	11
10	California	2–4–2	8
11	NC State	1–3–4	7
12	Stanford	1–4–3	6
13	Syracuse	1–5–2	5
14	Boston College	1–6–1	4
15	Duke	1–6–1	4

== Bracket ==
*Note: Home team listed first. Rankings shown are ACC Tournament Seeds.

First Round; November 4 ACCNX
8	Notre Dame	2 (4)
9	Virginia	2 (5)
4	Pittsburgh	1 (6)
13	Syracuse	1 (7)
5	Louisville	1
12	Stanford	2
3	Wake Forest	1 (6)
14	Boston College	1 (5)
6	Virginia Tech	1
11	NC State	2
7	North Carolina	1 (4)
10	California	1 (3)
2	Clemson	2
15	Duke	1

Quarterfinals; November 8 ACCN
1	SMU	6
9	Virginia	0
13	Syracuse	2
12	Stanford	1
3	Wake Forest	0
11	NC State	1
7	North Carolina	3
2	Clemson	2

Semifinals; November 12; ACCN
1	SMU	3
13	Syracuse	0
11	NC State	0
7	North Carolina	1

Final; November 15; ESPNU
1	SMU
7	North Carolina

== Matches ==
=== First round ===
November 4, 2026	(5) Louisville	1–2	(12) Stanford	Louisville, Kentucky
6:00 p.m. EST	Ashton Flowers (yellow card) 51'; Emil Thor 87'; Jack Boring (yellow card) 74'	Report	43' Victor Fung; (yellow card) 57' Alex Chow; (yellow card) 71' Yujin Kikuchi; (yellow card) 74' Team; 89' Jayden Fitzgerald Boes	Stadium: Lynn Stadium; Attendance: 854; Referee: Sergio Gonzalez; Assistant referees: Eric Burton; Sean West; Fourth official: Nicole Green

November 4, 2026	(3) Wake Forest	1–1 (a.e.t.) (6–5 p)	(14) Boston College	Winston-Salem, North Carolina
6:00 p.m. EST	Daniel Krueger (yellow card) 78', (goal) 89'; Team (yellow card) 89'; Mason Sullivan (yellow card) 96'	Report	(yellow card) 22' Henry Wassarman; (yellow card) 29' Russell Brown; (yellow card) 60' Jack Burkhardt; 82' (pen.) Dylan Mafong	Stadium: Spry Stadium; Attendance: 822; Referee: Justin St. Pierre; Assistant referees: Raymond Thomas; Justin Howard; Fourth official: Ralph Polson

November 4, 2026	(6) Virginia Tech	1–2	(11) NC State	Blacksburg, Virginia
6:00 p.m. EST	Luke Hamel 26'; Alex Perez (yellow card) 72'; Tito Peralta (yellow card) 80'	Report	51' Russell Berko; 67' Aidan Payne	Stadium: Thompson Field; Attendance: 321; Referee: John Matto; Assistant referees: Rick Rogers; Hillis Waddell; Fourth official: John Rush

November 4, 2026	(7) North Carolina	1–1 (a.e.t.) (4–3 p)	(10) California	Chapel Hill, North Carolina
6:00 p.m. EST	Luca Nikolai (yellow card) 75'; Joschi Schelb 83'; Evans Dapaah (yellow card) 102'	Report	23' Malcolm Zalayet; (yellow card) 84' Thomas Grimes; (yellow card) 93' Noe Morales	Stadium: Dorrance Field; Attendance: 554; Referee: Kyle Johnston; Assistant referees: Josiah Parke; Kevin Uitto; Fourth official: Brandon Marion

November 4, 2026	(2) Clemson	2–1	(15) Duke	Clemson, South Carolina
7:00 p.m. EST	Duncan Wilson 16'; Philip Rolke 28'; Breno Correia (yellow card) 60'; Xander Sevian (yellow card) 71'	Report	(yellow card) 24' Ulfur Bjornsson; 55' Nikolai Bull Jorgensen; (yellow card) 75' Adrian Byasiima; (yellow card) 90' Tucker Smith	Stadium: Riggs Field; Attendance: 892; Referee: Kevin Maurer; Assistant referees: Benjamin Wooten; Thomas Brigman; Fourth official: Deny Kulasinac

November 4, 2026	(4) Pittsburgh	1–1 (a.e.t.) (6–7 p)	(13) Syracuse	Pittsburgh, Pennsylvania
7:00 p.m. EST	Mamadou Tall 78'; Caden Grabfelder (yellow card) 107'	Report	17' Bryson Rodriguez; (yellow card) 106' Garrett Holman	Stadium: Ambrose Urbanic Field; Attendance: 476; Referee: Richonne Clark; Assistant referees: John Safar; Jeremiah Jemison; Fourth official: Ross Kleinstuber

November 4, 2026	(8) Notre Dame	2–2 (a.e.t.) (4–5 p)	(9) Virginia	Notre Dame, Indiana
7:00 p.m. EST	Will Schroeder 14'; Tristan Tropeano 21'; Sean McDowd (yellow card) 51'	Report	15' Parker Sloan; 39' Brendan Lambe; (yellow card) 105' Bacary Tandjigora; (yellow card) 109' Emiliano Mercenari	Stadium: Alumni Stadium

=== Quarterfinals ===
November 8, 2026	(2) Clemson	2–3 (a.e.t.)	(7) North Carolina	Clemson, South Carolina
12:00 p.m. EST	Martin Bakken 52'; Arthur Duquenne (yellow card) 61'; Ransford Gyan 69'	Report	20' Nicolas Loebus; 29' Bertil Rygaard Hansen; (yellow card) 56' Evans Dapaah; (yellow card) 98' Riley Berge; 105' (pen.) Luca Nikolai	Stadium: Riggs Field; Attendance: 1,687; Referee: Dimitar Chavdarov; Assistant referees: Chris Zuerner; William Steffen; Fourth official: John Rush

November 8, 2026	(3) Wake Forest	0–1 (a.e.t.)	(11) NC State	Winston-Salem, North Carolina
2:00 p.m. EST	Chandler Young (yellow card) 60'; Daniel Krueger (yellow card) 71'; William Kuisel (yellow card) 81'	Report	(yellow card) 68' Brandon Bent; (yellow card) 68' Tyler Caton; (yellow card) 89' (goal) 91' Austin Bush	Stadium: Spry Stadium; Attendance: 1,692; Referee: Austin Saini; Assistant referees: Marcus Moss; Josiah Parke; Fourth official: Brandon Marion

November 8, 2026	(1) SMU	6–0	(9) Virginia	University Park, Texas
4:00 p.m. EST	Landon Hickam 12'; Milton Lopez 15'; Mukisa Emmanuel 34', 81'; Ryan Clanton-Pimentel 54'; Stephan Soghomonian 61'	Report		Stadium: Washburne Stadium; Attendance: 2,296; Referee: Kevin Maurer; Assistant referees: Jarrod Teckel; Arron Donahoe; Fourth official: Stephen Bartelme

November 8, 2026	(12) Stanford	1–2 (a.e.t.)	(13) Syracuse	Stanford, California
6:00 p.m. EST	Aidan Reilly (yellow card) 54'; Jack Pymm 86' (yellow card) 86'	Report	(yellow card) 35' Pablo Patrick-Galvez; 85', 102' Jordan Grey	Stadium: Cagan Stadium; Attendance: 1,272; Referee: Frank Anderson; Assistant referees: Ian Sullivan-Svetich; Bernard Abousleiman; Fourth official: Levi Rippy

=== Semifinals ===
November 12, 2026	(11) NC State	0–1	(7) North Carolina	Cary, North Carolina
5:30 p.m. EST	Tyler Caton (yellow card) 43'	Report	62' Joschi Schelb	Stadium: WakeMed Soccer Park; Attendance: 3,253; Referee: Kevin Mauer; Assistant referees: Elizabeth McDonald; Fritz Barberousse; Fourth official: Shaye Lane

November 12, 2026	(1) SMU	3–0	(13) Syracuse	Cary, North Carolina
8:30 p.m. EST	Enzo Panozzo (yellow card) 24'; Mukisa Emmanuel 44' (pen.); Andre Philibbosian 54'; Stephan Soghomonian 65'; Noah Holmstrom (yellow card) 69'	Report	(yellow card) 67' Kelvin Da Costa; (yellow card) 74' Kristjan Fortier	Stadium: WakeMed Soccer Park; Attendance: 278; Referee: David Erbacher; Assistant referees: Eric Burton; Carlos Morales-Lastra; Fourth official: Adam Kilpatrick

=== Final ===
November 15, 2026	(1) SMU	v	(7) North Carolina	Cary, NC
4:00 p.m. EST				Stadium: WakeMed Soccer Park

== Statistics ==
=== Goalscorers ===
There have been 38 goals scored in 13 matches, for an average of 2.92 goals per match (as of November 12, 2026).

3 goals

- Mukisa Emmanuel – SMU

2 goals

- Joschi Schelb – North Carolina
- Stephan Soghomonian – SMU
- Jordan Grey – Syracuse

1 goal

- Dylan Mafong – Boston College
- Malcolm Zalayet – California
- Martin Bakken – Clemson
- Ransford Gyan – Clemson
- Philip Rolke – Clemson
- Duncan Wilson – Clemson
- Nikolai Bull Jorgensen – Duke
- Emil Thor – Louisville
- Russell Berko – NC State
- Austin Bush – NC State
- Aidan Payne – NC State
- Bertil Rygaard Hansen – North Carolina
- Nicolas Loebus – North Carolina
- Luca Nikolai – North Carolina
- Will Schroeder – Notre Dame
- Tristan Tropeano – Notre Dame
- Mamadou Tall – Pittsburgh
- Ryan Clanton-Pimentel – SMU
- Landon Hickam – SMU
- Milton Lopez – SMU
- Andre Philibbosian – SMU
- Jayden Fitzgerald Boes – Stanford
- Victor Fung – Stanford
- Jack Pymm – Stanford
- Bryson Rodriguez – Syracuse
- Brendan Lambe – Virginia
- Parker Sloan – Virginia
- Luke Hamel – Virginia Tech
- Daniel Krueger – Wake Forest
