= 2026 Virginia Tech Hokies men's soccer team =

American college soccer season

2026 Virginia Tech Hokies men's soccer
- Conference: Atlantic Coast Conference
- Record: 8–6–3 (4–2–2 ACC)
- Head coach: Mike Brizendine (18th season)
- Assistant coaches: Patrick McSorley; Jeff Kinney; Kyle Renfro
- Home stadium: Thompson Field

2026 ACC men's soccer standings
	Conf.					Overall
Team	W		L		T	W		L		T
No. 2 SMU †	6	–	0	–	2	12	–	0	–	3
No. 3 Clemson	6	–	1	–	1	12	–	2	–	2
No. 15 Wake Forest	5	–	3	–	0	11	–	4	–	2
No. 20 Pittsburgh	4	–	2	–	2	9	–	4	–	3
No. 8 Louisville	4	–	2	–	2	12	–	2	–	3
Virginia Tech	4	–	2	–	2	8	–	5	–	3
No. 17 North Carolina	3	–	1	–	4	8	–	2	–	5
Notre Dame	4	–	4	–	0	7	–	5	–	3
Virginia	3	–	3	–	2	7	–	6	–	3
California	2	–	4	–	2	6	–	5	–	4
NC State	1	–	3	–	4	5	–	5	–	6
Stanford	1	–	4	–	3	8	–	4	–	3
Syracuse	1	–	5	–	2	7	–	7	–	2
Boston College	1	–	6	–	1	6	–	6	–	3
Duke	1	–	6	–	1	7	–	9	–	1
† – Conference champion ‡ – ACC tournament champion + – At-large invitation to the 2026 NCAA tournament; As of November 3, 2026; Rankings from United Soccer Coaches; Source:The ACC

The 2026 Virginia Tech Hokies men's soccer team represents Virginia Tech during the 2026 NCAA Division I men's soccer season. The Hokies are led by head coach Mike Brizendine, in his eighteenth season. They play their home games at Thompson Field in Blacksburg, Virginia. This is the team's 55th season playing organized men's college soccer and their 23rd playing in the Atlantic Coast Conference.

The Hokies were picked to finish twelfth of fifteen teams in the ACC preseason coaches' poll. They opened the season with a 1–0 loss at Ohio State, then won their home opener 7–0 over Howard, their first 7–0 win since 1973, and beat Kentucky 3–0 for their first win over the Wildcats. After a home loss to East Tennessee State, the Hokies beat Wake Forest 2–1 in their ACC home opener, Brizendine's 150th career win, and followed with a 4–2 win at Duke, their first win over the Blue Devils since 2019. A 3–0 home loss to third-ranked SMU ended a three-match winning streak. On October 2, Virginia Tech won 2–1 at Virginia in the Commonwealth Clash, the program's third win in Charlottesville. After losses at tenth-ranked Pittsburgh and Furman and a draw with Winthrop, the Hokies played to a 2–2 draw against third-ranked Clemson despite playing a man down from the 44th minute, their first result of the season against a ranked opponent. They closed the regular season with a 2–1 win over Syracuse, their first home win over the Orange since 2018.

The Hokies finished the regular season 8–5–3 and 4–2–2 in ACC play to finish in sixth place. As the sixth seed in the ACC Tournament, they hosted a tournament match for the first time since 2021, but lost 2–1 to eleventh seed NC State in the First Round after Luke Hamel had given them a first-half lead. Chase Vazquez leads the team with five goals.

== Previous season ==
The Hokies finished the 2025 season 7–4–5 and 2–3–3 in ACC play. Their season included a 1–0 home win over third-ranked Ohio State in the opener. In the ACC Tournament, they lost 2–1 at Syracuse in the First Round and did not receive a bid to the NCAA Tournament.

== Player movement ==
=== Players leaving ===
Departures
Name	Number	Pos.	Height	Year	Hometown	Reason for Departure
Sam Joseph	1	GK	6'4"	Senior	San Diego, California	Graduated
Evan Schroeder	4	DF	6'1"	Senior	Atlanta, Georgia	Graduated
Declan Quill	7	FW	6'2"	Senior	Falls Church, Virginia	Graduated
Ugo Bertelli	8	MF	5'6"	Junior	Marseille, France	—
Colin Beutel	11	FW	6'2"	Freshman	Munich, Germany	—
Harrison Krieg	12	MF	5'10"	Senior	Irvington, New York	Graduated
Osi Onwudiwe	14	FW	6'1"	Freshman	Woodbridge, Virginia	Transferred to Xavier
Andy Sullins	15	FW	6'1"	Senior	Athens, Tennessee	Graduated
Yassine Rhoumar	20	DF	6'0"	Junior	Alexandria, Virginia	—
Tiago Portela	23	MF	6'1"	Freshman	Braga, Portugal	—
Joao Felicio	24	DF	5'7"	Freshman	Lisbon, Portugal	—
Zach Glesius	25	GK	6'0"	Senior	Avon Lake, Ohio	Graduated

=== Players arriving ===
==== Incoming transfers ====
Incoming transfers
Name	Number	Pos.	Height	Year	Hometown	Previous School
Chase Vazquez	8	FW	5'10"	Redshirt Junior	Boca Raton, Florida	Louisville
Thomas Kleinpenning	16	MF	5'11"	Graduate Student	Ulft, Netherlands	Young Harris
Diego Dauzier	25	GK	6'3"	Redshirt Sophomore	Montclair, New Jersey	Temple
Eduardo Cornejo	29	FW	5'7"	Junior	Homestead, Florida	Miami Dade College
Freddy Ferguson	32	MF	5'8"	Junior	Ashburn, Virginia	VMI

==== Recruiting class ====
Name	Nat.	Hometown	Club / High school
Cassander Krane Dreyer; DF	NOR	Bodø, Norway	—
David Skovborg-Andersen; MF	DEN	Copenhagen, Denmark	—
Parker Polk; MF	USA	Charlottesville, Virginia	Western Albemarle
Luke Stavrou; DF	USA	Leesburg, Virginia	Riverside
Luke Hamel; MF	USA	McLean, Virginia	McLean
Chuy Moreno; DF	USA	Pearland, Texas	SAI Academy
Jakub Porada; FW	USA	Ashburn, Virginia	Briar Woods
Mehdi Kettani; MF	MAR	Casablanca, Morocco	Lycée Français International Louis-Massignon
Jaden Chan Tack; DF	USA	Denver, Colorado	Colorado Connections Academy
Henry Blackledge; GK	AUS	Queensland, Australia	Ipswich Grammar School

== Squad ==
=== Roster ===
As of November 6, 2026

Note: Flags indicate national team as defined under FIFA eligibility rules; some limited exceptions apply. Players may hold more than one non-FIFA nationality.

No.	Pos.	Nation	Player
0	GK	USA	Cameron Farrell
1	GK	SWE	Leo Ledin
2	DF	ENG	Amir Ariely
3	DF	ENG	Ethan Page
4	MF	ARG	Beltran Alvarez
5	MF	FRA	Yanis Belatrache
6	MF	USA	Mathias Yohannes
7	DF	NOR	Cassander Krane Dreyer
8	FW	USA	Chase Vazquez
9	FW	USA	Alex Perez
10	MF	USA	Ian Marcano
11	MF	DEN	David Skovborg-Andersen
12	MF	USA	Parker Polk
13	FW	ISL	Dagur Traustason
14	DF	USA	Luke Stavrou

No.	Pos.	Nation	Player
15	MF	USA	Luke Hamel
16	MF	NED	Thomas Kleinpenning
17	DF	USA	Chuy Moreno
18	FW	ESP	Alvaro Ruiz-Mateos
20	FW	USA	Jakub Porada
21	FW	USA	Noe Uwimana
22	DF	ESP	Tito Peralta
23	MF	MAR	Mehdi Kettani
24	DF	USA	Jaden Chan Tack
25	GK	USA	Diego Dauzier
27	GK	AUS	Henry Blackledge
29	FW	USA	Eduardo Cornejo
30	MF	USA	Landan Grange
32	MF	USA	Freddy Ferguson

=== Team management ===
Position	Staff
Head coach	(United States) Mike Brizendine
Associate head coach	Patrick McSorley
Associate head coach	Jeff Kinney
Assistant coach	Kyle Renfro

== Schedule ==
Date Time, TV	Rank^{#}	Opponent^{#}	Result	Record	Site (Attendance) City, State
Regular season
August 20*; 8:00 p.m.		at Ohio State	L 0–1	0–1–0	Jesse Owens Memorial Stadium (1,266); Columbus, OH
August 23*; 4:00 p.m.		Howard	W 7–0	1–1–0	Thompson Field (768); Blacksburg, VA
August 28*; 6:00 p.m.		Kentucky	W 3–0	2–1–0	Thompson Field (473); Blacksburg, VA
September 5; 6:00 p.m.		at NC State	T 1–1	2–1–1 (0–0–1)	Dail Soccer Field (1,381); Raleigh, NC
September 9*; 6:00 p.m.		East Tennessee State	L 1–3	2–2–1	Thompson Field (407); Blacksburg, VA
September 13; 6:00 p.m.		Wake Forest	W 2–1	3–2–1 (1–0–1)	Thompson Field (831); Blacksburg, VA
September 18; 7:00 p.m.		at Duke	W 4–2	4–2–1 (2–0–1)	Koskinen Stadium (908); Durham, NC
September 22*; 6:00 p.m.		Queens	W 3–0	5–2–1	Thompson Field (482); Blacksburg, VA
September 27; 4:00 p.m.		No. 3 SMU	L 0–3	5–3–1 (2–1–1)	Thompson Field (930); Blacksburg, VA
October 2; 8:00 p.m.		at Virginia; Commonwealth Clash	W 2–1	6–3–1 (3–1–1)	Klöckner Stadium (1,694); Charlottesville, VA
October 6*; 6:00 p.m.		Longwood	W 3–1	7–3–1	Thompson Field (317); Blacksburg, VA
October 9; 7:00 p.m.		at No. 10 Pittsburgh	L 0–3	7–4–1 (3–2–1)	Ambrose Urbanic Field (775); Pittsburgh, PA
October 16*; 6:00 p.m.		at Furman	L 2–3	7–5–1	Stone Soccer Stadium (402); Greenville, SC
October 21*; 6:00 p.m.		Winthrop	T 1–1	7–5–2	Thompson Field (369); Blacksburg, VA
October 25; 2:00 p.m.		No. 3 Clemson	T 2–2	7–5–3 (3–2–2)	Thompson Field (831); Blacksburg, VA
October 30; 5:00 p.m.		Syracuse	W 2–1	8–5–3 (4–2–2)	Thompson Field (622); Blacksburg, VA
ACC Tournament
November 4*; 6:00 p.m., ACCNX	(6)	(11) NC State; First Round	L 1–2	8–6–3	Thompson Field (321); Blacksburg, VA
*Non-conference game. ^{#}Rankings from United Soccer Coaches. (#) Tournament seedings in parentheses. All times are in Eastern.

== Goals record ==
Through November 4, 2026.

Rank	No.	Nat.	Po.	Name	Regular season	ACC Tournament	NCAA Tournament	Total
1	8	(United States)	FW	Chase Vazquez	5	0	0	5
2	15	(United States)	MF	Luke Hamel	3	1	0	4
2	21	(United States)	FW	Noe Uwimana	4	0	0	4
4	2	(England)	DF	Amir Ariely	3	0	0	3
4	5	(France)	MF	Yanis Belatrache	3	0	0	3
4	13	(Iceland)	FW	Dagur Traustason	3	0	0	3
7	9	(United States)	FW	Alex Perez	2	0	0	2
7	18	(Spain)	FW	Alvaro Ruiz-Mateos	2	0	0	2
7	23	(Morocco)	MF	Mehdi Kettani	2	0	0	2
7	24	(United States)	DF	Jaden Chan Tack	2	0	0	2
11	11	(Denmark)	MF	David Skovborg-Andersen	1	0	0	1
11	12	(United States)	MF	Parker Polk	1	0	0	1
11	22	(Spain)	DF	Tito Peralta	1	0	0	1
Own goals					1	0	0	1
Total					33	1	0	34

== Disciplinary record ==
Through November 4, 2026. Does not include four cautions issued to the Virginia Tech bench.

Rank	No.	Nat.	Po.	Name	Regular Season			ACC Tournament			NCAA Tournament			Total		
Rank	No.	Nat.	Po.	Name	Yellow card	(yellow card) (yellow-red card)	Red card	Yellow card	(yellow card) (yellow-red card)	Red card	Yellow card	(yellow card) (yellow-red card)	Red card	Yellow card	(yellow card) (yellow-red card)	Red card
1	22	(Spain)	DF	Tito Peralta	5	0	1	1	0	0	0	0	0	6	0	1
2	21	(United States)	FW	Noe Uwimana	2	0	1	0	0	0	0	0	0	2	0	1
3	18	(Spain)	FW	Alvaro Ruiz-Mateos	3	0	0	0	0	0	0	0	0	3	0	0
3	24	(United States)	DF	Jaden Chan Tack	3	0	0	0	0	0	0	0	0	3	0	0
5	3	(England)	DF	Ethan Page	1	1	0	0	0	0	0	0	0	1	1	0
6	5	(France)	MF	Yanis Belatrache	2	0	0	0	0	0	0	0	0	2	0	0
6	9	(United States)	FW	Alex Perez	1	0	0	1	0	0	0	0	0	2	0	0
6	12	(United States)	MF	Parker Polk	2	0	0	0	0	0	0	0	0	2	0	0
6	15	(United States)	MF	Luke Hamel	2	0	0	0	0	0	0	0	0	2	0	0
6	25	(United States)	GK	Diego Dauzier	2	0	0	0	0	0	0	0	0	2	0	0
11	4	(Argentina)	MF	Beltran Alvarez	1	0	0	0	0	0	0	0	0	1	0	0
11	6	(United States)	MF	Mathias Yohannes	1	0	0	0	0	0	0	0	0	1	0	0
11	13	(Iceland)	FW	Dagur Traustason	1	0	0	0	0	0	0	0	0	1	0	0
11	14	(United States)	DF	Luke Stavrou	1	0	0	0	0	0	0	0	0	1	0	0
Total					27	1	2	2	0	0	0	0	0	29	1	2

== Awards and honors ==
Recipient	Award	Date	Ref.
Yanis Belatrache	ACC Preseason Watch List	August 12	

== Rankings ==
Ranking movements Legend: ██ Increase in ranking ██ Decrease in ranking — = Not ranked RV = Received votes
	Week																
Poll	Pre	1	2	3	4	5	6	7	8	9	10	11	12	13	14	15	Final
United Soccer	—	—	—	—	—	—	—	RV	—	—	—	—		Not released			
TopDrawer Soccer	—	—	—	—	—	—	—	—	—	—	—	—	—				
College Soccer News	—	—	RV	—	—	—	—	RV	—	—	—	—			Not released		
