= 2026 Pittsburgh Panthers men's soccer team =

American college soccer season

2026 Pittsburgh Panthers men's soccer
- Conference: Atlantic Coast Conference
- U. Soc. Coaches poll: No. 20
- TopDrawerSoccer.com: No. 24
- Record: 9–4–4 (4–2–2 ACC)
- Head coach: Jay Vidovich (11th season)
- Assistant coaches: Bryce Cregan; Will Marshall; Robby Dambrot
- Home stadium: Ambrose Urbanic Field

2026 ACC men's soccer standings
	Conf.					Overall
Team	W		L		T	W		L		T
No. 2 SMU †	6	–	0	–	2	12	–	0	–	3
No. 3 Clemson	6	–	1	–	1	12	–	2	–	2
No. 15 Wake Forest	5	–	3	–	0	11	–	4	–	2
No. 20 Pittsburgh	4	–	2	–	2	9	–	4	–	3
No. 8 Louisville	4	–	2	–	2	12	–	2	–	3
Virginia Tech	4	–	2	–	2	8	–	5	–	3
No. 17 North Carolina	3	–	1	–	4	8	–	2	–	5
Notre Dame	4	–	4	–	0	7	–	5	–	3
Virginia	3	–	3	–	2	7	–	6	–	3
California	2	–	4	–	2	6	–	5	–	4
NC State	1	–	3	–	4	5	–	5	–	6
Stanford	1	–	4	–	3	8	–	4	–	3
Syracuse	1	–	5	–	2	7	–	7	–	2
Boston College	1	–	6	–	1	6	–	6	–	3
Duke	1	–	6	–	1	7	–	9	–	1
† – Conference champion ‡ – ACC tournament champion + – At-large invitation to the 2026 NCAA tournament; As of November 3, 2026; Rankings from United Soccer Coaches; Source:The ACC

The 2026 Pittsburgh Panthers men's soccer team represents the University of Pittsburgh during the 2026 NCAA Division I men's soccer season. The Panthers are led by head coach Jay Vidovich, in his eleventh season, and play their home games at Ambrose Urbanic Field at the Petersen Sports Complex in Pittsburgh, Pennsylvania. They compete in the Atlantic Coast Conference.

The Panthers began the season unranked and lost their opener 2–1 to seventh-ranked Maryland. They won 2–1 at Penn State, drew 0–0 at eighth-ranked Michigan State, and lost their ACC opener 3–1 to SMU. A 2–1 win at California on September 20 was Vidovich's 100th win at Pitt and the program's first win over California. Five days later, a 1–0 win over sixteenth-ranked Louisville gave the Panthers their third straight win. Wins over Virginia Tech and Duquesne lifted Pitt to seventh in the United Soccer Coaches poll, but they then lost 1–0 to North Carolina and 6–1 to third-ranked Georgetown. The Panthers closed the regular season with a 2–0 win at Boston College and a 0–0 draw at Virginia.

The Panthers finished the regular season 9–4–3 and 4–2–2 in ACC play. As the fourth seed in the ACC Tournament, they hosted thirteenth seed Syracuse in the First Round. The match ended 1–1 after extra time, and Syracuse won the penalty shootout 7–6. Pitt will await the NCAA Tournament selection show on November 16. Mamadou Tall leads the team with six goals.

== Background ==
The Panthers finished the 2025 season 6–7–5 and 1–4–3 in ACC play. In the ACC Tournament, they won 1–0 at Clemson in the First Round before losing 1–0 at California in the Quarterfinals, and they did not receive a bid to the NCAA Tournament. }|

== Player movement ==
=== Players leaving ===
Departures
Name	Number	Pos.	Height	Year	Hometown	Reason for Departure
Jackson Gilman	2	DF	5′11″	Senior	Schwenksville, Pennsylvania	Graduated
Jacob Redenfors	3	DF	6′1″	Freshman	Varberg, Sweden	Transferred to West Virginia
Lasse Dahl	7	FW	6′1″	Sophomore	Vildbjerg, Denmark	—
Jakob Löpping	8	MF	5′8″	Freshman	Luzern, Switzerland	—
Marco Silva	11	MF	5′11″	Redshirt Junior	Coopersburg, Pennsylvania	—
Arnau Vilamitjana	14	MF	6′2″	Graduate Student	Girona, Spain	Graduated
Joshua Veychek	18	MF	5′9″	Sophomore	Pittsburgh, Pennsylvania	Transferred to Western Michigan
Loke Mattsson	19	FW	5′8″	Freshman	Trelleborg, Sweden	—
Casper Svendby	21	DF	5′10″	Senior	Drammen, Norway	Graduated
Tomas Bedouret	23	MF	5′10″	Redshirt Senior	Rosario, Argentina	Graduated
Owen Christopher	29	DF	5′10″	Sophomore	North Huntingdon, Pennsylvania	—
Nick Bishop	31	GK	6′2″	Freshman	St. Louis, Missouri	—
Cooper Sisson	32	GK	6′2″	Sophomore	Irwin, Pennsylvania	—

=== Players arriving ===
==== Incoming transfers ====
Incoming transfers
Name	Number	Pos.	Height	Year	Hometown	Previous School
Ethan Pendleton	2	DF	5′11″	Sophomore	Washington, D.C.	UCLA
Caden Grabfelder	11	MF	6′1″	Senior	Northampton, Pennsylvania	Penn State
Cristian LoGrasso	14	MF	5′10″	Senior	Montville, New Jersey	NJIT
Pablo Portero	21	MF	6′0″	Junior	Gran Canaria, Spain	Georgia Southern
Cannon Scretchen	22	DF	6′0″	Junior	Nashville, Tennessee	Xavier

==== Recruiting class ====
Name	Nat.	Hometown	Club / High school
Kareem Ahmed; MF	ENG	Liverpool, England	—
Bruno Bertran; FW	ESP	Barcelona, Spain	—
Carter Kopay; MF	USA	Moon Township, Pennsylvania	—
Mamadou Tall; FW	SEN	Dakar, Senegal	—
Simon Tonidandel; MF	USA	Clemmons, North Carolina	—
Taren Wente; GK	USA	Albuquerque, New Mexico	—

== Squad ==
=== Roster ===
As of November 6, 2026

Note: Flags indicate national team as defined under FIFA eligibility rules; some limited exceptions apply. Players may hold more than one non-FIFA nationality.

No.	Pos.	Nation	Player
0	GK	USA	Taren Wente
1	GK	USA	Jack Moxom
2	DF	USA	Ethan Pendleton
4	DF	ESP	Ferran Baqué
5	DF	SUI	Niklas Sørensen
6	MF	USA	Logan Oliver
7	MF	ENG	Kareem Ahmed
9	FW	NOR	Albert Thorsen
10	MF	ESP	Miguel Bertran
11	MF	USA	Caden Grabfelder
12	FW	SEN	Mamadou Tall
13	DF	USA	Josh Hardin
14	MF	USA	Cristian LoGrasso

No.	Pos.	Nation	Player
15	FW	USA	Zahir Dyke
18	MF	USA	Carter Kopay
19	FW	ESP	Bruno Bertran
20	MF	USA	Grayson Carter
21	MF	ESP	Pablo Portero
22	DF	USA	Cannon Scretchen
24	DF	USA	Gavin Wetzel
25	MF	USA	Simon Tonidandel
26	MF	USA	Anders Bordoy
27	FW	USA	Alex Hauskrecht
28	MF	COL	Santiago Ferreira
31	GK	USA	Lukah Shah

=== Team management ===
Position	Staff
Head coach	Jay Vidovich
Assistant coach	Bryce Cregan
Assistant coach	Will Marshall
Assistant coach	Robby Dambrot

== Schedule ==
Date Time, TV	Rank^{#}	Opponent^{#}	Result	Record	Site (Attendance) City, State
Regular season
August 20*; 7:00 p.m., ACCNX		No. 7 Maryland	L 1–2	0–1–0	Ambrose Urbanic Field (1,074); Pittsburgh, PA
August 24*; 7:00 p.m., ACCNX		Bucknell	W 3–1	1–1–0	Ambrose Urbanic Field (521); Pittsburgh, PA
August 28*; 7:00 p.m., B1G+		at Penn State	W 2–1	2–1–0	Jeffrey Field (1,502); University Park, PA
September 3*; 7:00 p.m., B1G+		at No. 8 Michigan State	T 0–0	2–1–1	DeMartin Stadium (1,532); East Lansing, MI
September 7*; 7:00 p.m., ACCNX		Penn	W 1–0	3–1–1	Ambrose Urbanic Field (508); Pittsburgh, PA
September 11; 7:00 p.m., ACCNX		No. 7 SMU	L 1–3	3–2–1 (0–1–0)	Ambrose Urbanic Field (681); Pittsburgh, PA
September 15*; 7:00 p.m., ACCNX		No. 17 Cornell	W 2–0	4–2–1	Ambrose Urbanic Field (396); Pittsburgh, PA
September 20; 6:30 p.m., ACCNX		at California	W 2–1	5–2–1 (1–1–0)	Edwards Stadium (212); Berkeley, CA
September 25; 7:00 p.m., ACCNX	No. 20	No. 16 Louisville	W 1–0	6–2–1 (2–1–0)	Ambrose Urbanic Field (753); Pittsburgh, PA
October 2; 7:00 p.m., ACCNX	No. 10	at Syracuse	T 1–1	6–2–2 (2–1–1)	SU Soccer Stadium (1,631); Syracuse, NY
October 9; 7:00 p.m., ACCNX	No. 10	Virginia Tech	W 3–0	7–2–2 (3–1–1)	Ambrose Urbanic Field (775); Pittsburgh, PA
October 13*; 7:00 p.m., ACCNX	No. 7	Duquesne	W 2–1	8–2–2	Ambrose Urbanic Field (600); Pittsburgh, PA
October 16; 7:00 p.m., ACCNX	No. 7	No. 20 North Carolina	L 0–1	8–3–2 (3–2–1)	Ambrose Urbanic Field (667); Pittsburgh, PA
October 19*; 7:00 p.m., ACCNX	No. 7	No. 3 Georgetown	L 1–6	8–4–2	Ambrose Urbanic Field (541); Pittsburgh, PA
October 23; 7:00 p.m., ACCNX	No. 17	at Boston College	W 2–0	9–4–2 (4–2–1)	Newton Campus Field (473); Newton, MA
October 30; 6:00 p.m., ACCNX	No. 18	at No. 13 Virginia	T 0–0	9–4–3 (4–2–2)	Klöckner Stadium (947); Charlottesville, VA
ACC Tournament
November 4*; 7:00 p.m., ACCNX	(4) No. 20	(13) Syracuse; First Round	T 1–1 (6–7 p) ^{2OT}	9–4–4	Ambrose Urbanic Field (476); Pittsburgh, PA
*Non-conference game. ^{#}Rankings from United Soccer Coaches. (#) Tournament seedings in parentheses. All times are in Eastern.

== Goals record ==
Through November 4, 2026.

Rank	No.	Nat.	Po.	Name	Regular season	ACC Tournament	NCAA Tournament	Total
1	12	(Senegal)	FW	Mamadou Tall	5	1	0	6
2	9	(Norway)	FW	Albert Thorsen	5	0	0	5
3	10	(Spain)	MF	Miguel Bertran	3	0	0	3
4	11	(United States)	MF	Caden Grabfelder	2	0	0	2
4	26	(United States)	MF	Anders Bordoy	2	0	0	2
6	18	(United States)	MF	Carter Kopay	1	0	0	1
6	20	(United States)	MF	Grayson Carter	1	0	0	1
6	22	(United States)	DF	Cannon Scretchen	1	0	0	1
6	28	(Colombia)	MF	Santiago Ferreira	1	0	0	1
Own goals					1	0	0	1
Total					22	1	0	23

== Disciplinary record ==
Through November 4, 2026. Does not include one caution issued to the Pittsburgh bench.

Rank	No.	Nat.	Po.	Name	Regular Season			ACC Tournament			NCAA Tournament			Total		
Rank	No.	Nat.	Po.	Name	Yellow card	(yellow card) (yellow-red card)	Red card	Yellow card	(yellow card) (yellow-red card)	Red card	Yellow card	(yellow card) (yellow-red card)	Red card	Yellow card	(yellow card) (yellow-red card)	Red card
1	6	(United States)	MF	Logan Oliver	4	0	1	0	0	0	0	0	0	4	0	1
2	10	(Spain)	MF	Miguel Bertran	3	0	0	0	0	0	0	0	0	3	0	0
2	21	(Spain)	MF	Pablo Portero	3	0	0	0	0	0	0	0	0	3	0	0
4	11	(United States)	MF	Caden Grabfelder	1	0	0	1	0	0	0	0	0	2	0	0
4	14	(United States)	MF	Cristian LoGrasso	2	0	0	0	0	0	0	0	0	2	0	0
4	18	(United States)	MF	Carter Kopay	2	0	0	0	0	0	0	0	0	2	0	0
4	22	(United States)	DF	Cannon Scretchen	2	0	0	0	0	0	0	0	0	2	0	0
4	24	(United States)	DF	Gavin Wetzel	2	0	0	0	0	0	0	0	0	2	0	0
4	27	(United States)	FW	Alex Hauskrecht	2	0	0	0	0	0	0	0	0	2	0	0
10	2	(United States)	DF	Ethan Pendleton	1	0	0	0	0	0	0	0	0	1	0	0
10	7	(England)	MF	Kareem Ahmed	1	0	0	0	0	0	0	0	0	1	0	0
10	9	(Norway)	FW	Albert Thorsen	1	0	0	0	0	0	0	0	0	1	0	0
10	12	(Senegal)	FW	Mamadou Tall	1	0	0	0	0	0	0	0	0	1	0	0
10	26	(United States)	MF	Anders Bordoy	1	0	0	0	0	0	0	0	0	1	0	0
10	28	(Colombia)	MF	Santiago Ferreira	1	0	0	0	0	0	0	0	0	1	0	0
Total					27	0	1	1	0	0	0	0	0	28	0	1

== Rankings ==
Ranking movements Legend: ██ Increase in ranking ██ Decrease in ranking — = Not ranked RV = Received votes
	Week																
Poll	Pre	1	2	3	4	5	6	7	8	9	10	11	12	13	14	15	Final
United Soccer	—	—	—	—	—	20	10	10	7	17	18	20		Not released			
TopDrawer Soccer	—	—	—	—	—	—	22	8	6	5	9	19	24				
College Soccer News	—	—	—	—	—	RV	17	11	—	8	11	13			Not released		
