= 2026 Notre Dame Fighting Irish men's soccer team =

American college soccer season

2026 Notre Dame Fighting Irish men's soccer
- Conference: Atlantic Coast Conference
- Record: 7–5–4 (4–4–0 ACC)
- Head coach: Chad Riley (9th season)
- Assistant coaches: Mike Graczyk; Jeff Rowland; Sam Biek
- Home stadium: Alumni Stadium

2026 ACC men's soccer standings
	Conf.					Overall
Team	W		L		T	W		L		T
No. 2 SMU †	6	–	0	–	2	12	–	0	–	3
No. 3 Clemson	6	–	1	–	1	12	–	2	–	2
No. 15 Wake Forest	5	–	3	–	0	11	–	4	–	2
No. 20 Pittsburgh	4	–	2	–	2	9	–	4	–	3
No. 8 Louisville	4	–	2	–	2	12	–	2	–	3
Virginia Tech	4	–	2	–	2	8	–	5	–	3
No. 17 North Carolina	3	–	1	–	4	8	–	2	–	5
Notre Dame	4	–	4	–	0	7	–	5	–	3
Virginia	3	–	3	–	2	7	–	6	–	3
California	2	–	4	–	2	6	–	5	–	4
NC State	1	–	3	–	4	5	–	5	–	6
Stanford	1	–	4	–	3	8	–	4	–	3
Syracuse	1	–	5	–	2	7	–	7	–	2
Boston College	1	–	6	–	1	6	–	6	–	3
Duke	1	–	6	–	1	7	–	9	–	1
† – Conference champion ‡ – ACC tournament champion + – At-large invitation to the 2026 NCAA tournament; As of November 3, 2026; Rankings from United Soccer Coaches; Source:The ACC

The 2026 Notre Dame Fighting Irish men's soccer team represents the University of Notre Dame during the 2026 NCAA Division I men's soccer season. The Fighting Irish are led by ninth-year head coach Chad Riley and play their home games at Alumni Stadium in Notre Dame, Indiana. They compete in the Atlantic Coast Conference.

Notre Dame's incoming recruiting class was ranked first in the nation by TopDrawerSoccer. The Irish opened the season with a 3–1 loss at twenty-second-ranked Indiana and draws with Northwestern and eighth-ranked Saint Louis, the latter on a late goal from freshman Tristan Tropeano. They then won five straight matches, including a 2–1 comeback win over Michigan, a 1–0 upset at seventeenth-ranked Clemson in their ACC opener, and a 3–1 win at top-ranked Stanford, which had entered the match 7–0–1. The run lifted Notre Dame to tenth in the United Soccer Coaches poll, but a 1–0 home loss to unranked Syracuse ended the streak. The Irish went 2–3–1 over the rest of the regular season, including a 7–1 loss at North Carolina.

Notre Dame finished the regular season 7–5–3 overall and 4–4 in ACC play, placing eighth and earning the final home game of the First Round of the ACC Tournament. They drew ninth seed Virginia 2–2 after two overtime periods and were eliminated 5–4 on penalties, leaving the Irish on the bubble for an at-large bid to the NCAA tournament. Tropeano led the team with six goals.

== Background ==
The Fighting Irish finished the 2025 season 9–7–4 overall and 3–3–2 in ACC play, and lost to North Carolina in the First Round of the ACC Tournament. In the NCAA tournament, they defeated third seed Michigan 1–0 in the First Round before losing 1–0 at Akron in the Second Round.

== Player movement ==
=== Players leaving ===
Departures
Name	Number	Pos.	Height	Weight	Year	Hometown	Reason for Departure
Mitch Ferguson	2	DF	6'4"	190	Senior	Glen Carbon, Illinois	Drafted 74th overall in the 2026 MLS SuperDraft by the Philadelphia Union; signed with Sporting Kansas City II
Wyatt Lewis	6	MF	6'1"	170	Junior	St. Charles, Missouri	Transferred to Washington
Wyatt Borso	9	FW	6'1"	180	Senior	Aurora, Illinois	Transferred to Oregon State
KK Baffour	10	MF	5'8"	145	Senior	Southport, Connecticut	Graduated
Daniel Boateng	12	MF	5'6"	140	Senior	Carpinteria, California	Graduated
Martin Von Thun	13	DF	6'3"	190	Graduate Student	Grimma, Germany	Graduated
Alex Rosin	17	DF	6'0"	165	Freshman	Rochester Hills, Michigan	Transferred to Western Michigan
Diego Ochoa	18	DF	6'1"	180	Graduate Student	Alexandria, Virginia	Graduated
Sebastian Green	24	MF	5'9"	155	Senior	Monterey, California	Graduated
Liam Egan	30	GK	6'5"	165	Graduate Student	Louisville, Kentucky	Graduated

=== Players arriving ===
==== Incoming transfers ====
Incoming transfers
Name	Number	Pos.	Height	Weight	Year	Hometown	Previous School
Vlad Walent	19	MF	5'9"	165	Graduate Student	Lafayette, Colorado	Wake Forest
Lincoln Ulrich	22	DF	6'3"	195	Senior	Delaware, Ohio	Coastal Carolina
Noah Deitrich	30	GK	6'3"	185	Graduate Student	Stevensville, Michigan	Western Michigan

==== Recruiting class ====
TopDrawerSoccer ranked Notre Dame's 2026 recruiting class, including transfers, first in the nation.

Name	Nat.	Hometown	Club	TDS Rank
Eli Ackerman; DF	USA	Natick, Massachusetts	New England Revolution	87
Michael Capretto; FW	USA	Hockessin, Delaware	FC Delco	124
Patrick Cuneo; FW	USA	Patterson, New York	New York City FC	—
Evan Lim; MF	USA	Cedar Grove, New Jersey	New York City FC	72
Maverick McCoy; DF	USA	Carmel, Indiana	Indy Eleven Pro Academy	112
Thaddeus Sawyer; DF	USA	Savannah, Georgia	Nashville SC	—
Ethan Scala; MF	USA	Boynton Beach, Florida	FC Florida	—
Tristan Tropeano; FW	USA	Birmingham, Alabama	Nashville SC	128

== Squad ==
=== Roster ===
As of November 5, 2026

Note: Flags indicate national team as defined under FIFA eligibility rules; some limited exceptions apply. Players may hold more than one non-FIFA nationality.

No.	Pos.	Nation	Player
0	GK	USA	Cole Kowalski
1	GK	USA	Blake Kelly
2	DF	USA	Eli Ackerman
3	DF	USA	Sean McDowd
4	DF	USA	Jack Ross
5	DF	USA	Will Schroeder
6	MF	USA	Ian Shaul
7	FW	USA	Nate Zimmermann
8	MF	USA	Nico Bartlett
9	FW	USA	Ren Sylvester
10	MF	USA	Nolan Spicer
11	FW	USA	Jack Flanagan
12	MF	USA	Ethan Scala
13	FW	USA	Tristan Tropeano
14	DF	USA	Maverick McCoy

No.	Pos.	Nation	Player
15	FW	USA	Michael Capretto
16	MF	USA	Leo Brummell
18	DF	USA	Thaddeus Sawyer
19	MF	USA	Vlad Walent
20	MF	USA	Brady Hilden
21	MF	USA	Karson Baquero
22	DF	USA	Lincoln Ulrich
23	FW	USA	Stevie Dunphy
24	MF	USA	Evan Lim
25	FW	USA	Patrick Cuneo
26	MF	USA	Diego Green
27	FW	USA	Luke Burton
30	GK	USA	Noah Deitrich

=== Team management ===
Position	Staff
Head coach	Chad Riley
Assistant coach	Mike Graczyk
Assistant coach	Jeff Rowland
Assistant coach / Director of operations	Sam Biek

== Schedule ==
Date Time, TV	Rank^{#}	Opponent^{#}	Result	Record	Site (Attendance) City, State
Regular season
August 20*; 8:00 p.m.		at No. 22 Indiana	L 1–3	0–1–0	Bill Armstrong Stadium (7,078); Bloomington, IN
August 23*; 7:30 p.m.		Northwestern	T 1–1	0–1–1	Alumni Stadium (714); South Bend, IN
August 28*; 7:30 p.m.		No. 8 Saint Louis	T 1–1	0–1–2	Alumni Stadium (929); South Bend, IN
August 31*; 7:30 p.m.		Harvard	W 3–1	1–1–2	Alumni Stadium (357); South Bend, IN
September 6*; 3:30 p.m.		Michigan	W 2–1	2–1–2	Alumni Stadium (1,004); South Bend, IN
September 11; 7:00 p.m.		at No. 17 Clemson	W 1–0	3–1–2 (1–0–0)	Riggs Field (6,143); Clemson, SC
September 15*; 7:00 p.m.	No. 20	Detroit Mercy	W 4–0	4–1–2	Alumni Stadium (504); South Bend, IN
September 20; 10:00 p.m.	No. 20	at No. 1 Stanford	W 3–1	5–1–2 (2–0–0)	Cagan Stadium (1,637); Stanford, CA
September 25; 7:00 p.m.	No. 10	Syracuse	L 0–1	5–2–2 (2–1–0)	Alumni Stadium (1,237); South Bend, IN
September 29*; 8:00 p.m.	No. 13	at UIC	T 1–1	5–2–3	Flames Field (611); Chicago, IL
October 3; 7:00 p.m.	No. 13	California	L 0–2	5–3–3 (2–2–0)	Alumni Stadium (1,147); South Bend, IN
October 10; 7:00 p.m.		at North Carolina	L 1–7	5–4–3 (2–3–0)	Dorrance Field (2,313); Chapel Hill, NC
October 17; 6:00 p.m.		Boston College	W 2–0	6–4–3 (3–3–0)	Alumni Stadium (564); South Bend, IN
October 25; 3:00 p.m.		at No. 10 Louisville	L 1–2	6–5–3 (3–4–0)	Lynn Stadium (813); Louisville, KY
October 30; 7:00 p.m.		Duke	W 3–0	7–5–3 (4–4–0)	Alumni Stadium (579); South Bend, IN
ACC Tournament
November 4*; 7:00 p.m.	(8)	(9) Virginia; First Round	T 2–2 ^{2OT (4–5 PK)}	7–5–4	Alumni Stadium (474); South Bend, IN
*Non-conference game. ^{#}Rankings from United Soccer Coaches. (#) Tournament seedings in parentheses. All times are in Eastern.

== Goals record ==
Through November 4, 2026.

Rank	No.	Nat.	Po.	Name	Regular season	ACC Tournament	NCAA Tournament	Total
1	13	(United States)	FW	Tristan Tropeano	5	1	0	6
2	19	(United States)	MF	Vlad Walent	4	0	0	4
3	10	(United States)	MF	Nolan Spicer	3	0	0	3
3	15	(United States)	FW	Michael Capretto	3	0	0	3
5	8	(United States)	MF	Nico Bartlett	2	0	0	2
5	23	(United States)	FW	Stevie Dunphy	2	0	0	2
7	5	(United States)	DF	Will Schroeder	0	1	0	1
7	6	(United States)	MF	Ian Shaul	1	0	0	1
7	7	(United States)	FW	Nate Zimmermann	1	0	0	1
7	9	(United States)	FW	Ren Sylvester	1	0	0	1
7	24	(United States)	MF	Evan Lim	1	0	0	1
7	27	(United States)	FW	Luke Burton	1	0	0	1
Total					24	2	0	26

== Disciplinary record ==
Through November 4, 2026. Does not include one caution issued to the Notre Dame bench.

Rank	No.	Nat.	Po.	Name	Regular Season			ACC Tournament			NCAA Tournament			Total		
Rank	No.	Nat.	Po.	Name	Yellow card	(yellow card) (yellow-red card)	Red card	Yellow card	(yellow card) (yellow-red card)	Red card	Yellow card	(yellow card) (yellow-red card)	Red card	Yellow card	(yellow card) (yellow-red card)	Red card
1	13	(United States)	FW	Tristan Tropeano	4	0	0	0	0	0	0	0	0	4	0	0
2	3	(United States)	DF	Sean McDowd	1	0	0	1	0	0	0	0	0	2	0	0
2	15	(United States)	FW	Michael Capretto	2	0	0	0	0	0	0	0	0	2	0	0
4	6	(United States)	MF	Ian Shaul	1	0	0	0	0	0	0	0	0	1	0	0
4	9	(United States)	FW	Ren Sylvester	1	0	0	0	0	0	0	0	0	1	0	0
4	11	(United States)	FW	Jack Flanagan	1	0	0	0	0	0	0	0	0	1	0	0
4	27	(United States)	FW	Luke Burton	1	0	0	0	0	0	0	0	0	1	0	0
Total					11	0	0	1	0	0	0	0	0	12	0	0

== Awards and honors ==
Recipient	Award	Date	Ref.
Blake Kelly	ACC Defensive Player of the Week – Week 3	September 8	
Vlad Walent	ACC Defensive Player of the Week – Week 4	September 15	
Blake Kelly	ACC Co-Defensive Player of the Week – Week 5	September 22	

== Rankings ==
Ranking movements Legend: ██ Increase in ranking ██ Decrease in ranking — = Not ranked RV = Received votes
	Week																
Poll	Pre	1	2	3	4	5	6	7	8	9	10	11	12	13	14	15	Final
United Soccer	—	—	—	—	20	10	13	—	—	—	—	—		Not released			
TopDrawer Soccer	—	—	—	—	—	18	5	10	—	—	—	—	—				
College Soccer News	—	—	—	—	RV	16	14	18	—	—	—	—			Not released		
