= 2026 Wake Forest Demon Deacons men's soccer team =

American college soccer season

2026 Wake Forest Demon Deacons men's soccer
- Conference: Atlantic Coast Conference
- U. Soc. Coaches poll: No. 15
- TopDrawerSoccer.com: No. 10
- Record: 11–4–3 (5–3–0 ACC)
- Head coach: Bobby Muuss (12th season)
- Assistant coaches: Dane Brenner (16th season); Zack Schilawski; Ade Taiwo
- Home stadium: Spry Stadium

2026 ACC men's soccer standings
	Conf.					Overall
Team	W		L		T	W		L		T
No. 2 SMU †	6	–	0	–	2	12	–	0	–	3
No. 3 Clemson	6	–	1	–	1	12	–	2	–	2
No. 15 Wake Forest	5	–	3	–	0	11	–	4	–	2
No. 20 Pittsburgh	4	–	2	–	2	9	–	4	–	3
No. 8 Louisville	4	–	2	–	2	12	–	2	–	3
Virginia Tech	4	–	2	–	2	8	–	5	–	3
No. 17 North Carolina	3	–	1	–	4	8	–	2	–	5
Notre Dame	4	–	4	–	0	7	–	5	–	3
Virginia	3	–	3	–	2	7	–	6	–	3
California	2	–	4	–	2	6	–	5	–	4
NC State	1	–	3	–	4	5	–	5	–	6
Stanford	1	–	4	–	3	8	–	4	–	3
Syracuse	1	–	5	–	2	7	–	7	–	2
Boston College	1	–	6	–	1	6	–	6	–	3
Duke	1	–	6	–	1	7	–	9	–	1
† – Conference champion ‡ – ACC tournament champion + – At-large invitation to the 2026 NCAA tournament; As of November 3, 2026; Rankings from United Soccer Coaches; Source:The ACC

The 2026 Wake Forest Demon Deacons men's soccer team represents Wake Forest University during the 2026 NCAA Division I men's soccer season. The Demon Deacons are led by head coach Bobby Muuss, in his twelfth season, and play their home games at Spry Stadium in Winston-Salem, North Carolina. They compete in the Atlantic Coast Conference.

Wake Forest entered the season unranked in the preseason United Soccer Coaches poll and was picked to finish ninth in the ACC preseason coaches' poll. The Demon Deacons went 2–1–1 in their first four matches, losing only at tenth-ranked Akron, and opened ACC play with a 6–1 win over Duke in which they led 5–0 at halftime. Tate Lorentz converted a penalty kick with 14 seconds remaining to beat Virginia 3–2, and an 87th-minute goal from captain Jeffrey White won the match at NC State 2–1, extending Wake Forest's unbeaten run against the Wolfpack to 24 matches dating back to 2006. After a 2–0 home loss to top-ranked SMU, the Demon Deacons won four straight, including a 2–0 win over Syracuse, and entered the United Soccer Coaches poll at twenty-third on October 13 before rising to fifteenth a week later. They closed the regular season with a 0–0 draw at Elon and a 2–1 loss at third-ranked Clemson on the Tigers' Senior Night. Goalkeeper Jonah Mednard was called up to the Haiti national team during the season.

The Demon Deacons finished the regular season 11–4–2 overall and 5–3–0 in ACC play and earned the third seed in the ACC Tournament. In the First Round, they drew fourteenth seed Boston College 1–1 and advanced 6–5 on penalties, with substitute goalkeeper Mednard saving a penalty in the shootout. They will host eleventh seed NC State in the Second Round.

== Background ==
The Demon Deacons finished the 2025 season 7–4–6 and did not qualify for the postseason. Following the season, Harvey Sarajian was selected fifth overall by Orlando City SC and Tate Lorentz 63rd overall by CF Montréal in the 2026 MLS SuperDraft.

== Player movement ==
=== Players leaving ===
Departures
Name	Number	Pos.	Height	Weight	Year	Hometown	Reason for Departure
John Di Stefano	1	GK	6'2"	—	Freshman	Syosset, New York	Transferred to Fairfield
Nico Rabiu	7	MF	5'10"	154	Redshirt Junior	Schenectady, New York	—
Harvey Sarajian	10	FW	6'2"	175	Sophomore	Naples, Florida	Drafted 5th overall in the 2026 MLS SuperDraft; signed with Orlando City SC
Vlad Walent	11	MF	5'9"	165	Redshirt Junior	Lafayette, Colorado	Transferred to Notre Dame
Ryan Belal	14	FW	6'0"	184	Sophomore	Baltimore, Maryland	Transferred to Saint Louis
Jojo Davila	15	DF	5'10"	158	Redshirt Freshman	Valrico, Florida	—
Cooper Flax	18	MF	6'0"	155	Senior	Dix Hills, New York	Signed homegrown contract with New York City FC
Cristian Escribano	19	DF	5'10"	158	Graduate Student	Frisco, Texas	Graduated
Basit Umar	22	MF	5'8"	153	Senior	Kumasi, Ghana	—
Will Jackson	25	DF	5'10"	152	Sophomore	Homewood, Alabama	—
Bret Russell	33	—	6'3"	—	Freshman	Bingham Farms, Michigan	—

Tate Lorentz, selected 63rd overall by CF Montréal in the 2026 MLS SuperDraft, returned to Wake Forest for his senior season.

=== Players arriving ===
==== Incoming transfers ====
Incoming transfers
Name	Number	Pos.	Height	Weight	Year	Hometown	Previous School
Miles Hadley	2	DF	6'1"	170	Junior	Atlanta, Georgia	Army
Marcos Miranda	11	MF	5'11"	—	Junior	Madrid, Spain	John Brown
Joby Reid	14	FW	6'4"	195	Sophomore	Tauranga, New Zealand	Houston Christian
Luke Kirilenko	25	DF	5'9"	—	Graduate Student	Cambridge, England	Hofstra
Ronnie Garcia	33	DF	6'1"	—	Sophomore	Dallas, Texas	Campbell

==== Recruiting class ====
Name	Nat.	Hometown	Club / High school
Philip Biskupski; MF	CAN	Mississauga, Ontario	Toronto FC
Will Kuisel; DF	USA	Batesville, Indiana	FC Cincinnati
Oliver Kurnik; MF	USA	Fallbrook, California	Orange County SC
Rooney Osei; MF	GHA	Ghana	Asanska FC
Henry Rosenfeld; MF	USA	Morristown, New Jersey	Morristown HS
Quinn Syrett; GK	USA	Brooklyn, New York	Charlotte FC
Nolan Tinsley; FW	USA	Los Angeles, California	Barça Residency Academy

== Squad ==
=== Roster ===
As of November 5, 2026

Note: Flags indicate national team as defined under FIFA eligibility rules; some limited exceptions apply. Players may hold more than one non-FIFA nationality.

No.	Pos.	Nation	Player
0	GK	USA	Jonah Mednard
1	GK	USA	Quinn Syrett
2	DF	USA	Miles Hadley
3	DF	USA	Travis Smith Jr.
4	DF	CAN	Amoni Thomas
5	DF	USA	Daniel Krueger
6	DF	CAN	Lorenze Currie
7	MF	CAN	Philip Biskupski
8	MF	USA	David Ndong Nguema
9	FW	CAN	Pariss Mitchell
11	MF	ESP	Marcos Miranda
12	MF	USA	Jose Perez
13	MF	USA	Jeffrey White
14	FW	NZL	Joby Reid
15	DF	USA	Will Kuisel

No.	Pos.	Nation	Player
16	MF	USA	Joel Torbic
17	MF	USA	Pierce Bateson
18	MF	USA	Henry Rosenfeld
19	MF	GHA	Rooney Osei
20	MF	LBR	Alfred Debah
21	FW	USA	Ethan Subachan
22	FW	USA	Nolan Tinsley
23	—	USA	Chandler Young
24	DF	USA	Mason Sullivan
25	DF	ENG	Luke Kirilenko
27	DF	USA	Copeland Berkley
29	MF	USA	Oliver Kurnik
30	GK	USA	Owen Barnett
32	MF	USA	Tate Lorentz
33	DF	USA	Ronnie Garcia

=== Team management ===
Position	Staff
Head coach	Bobby Muuss
Associate head coach / Director of goalkeeping	Dane Brenner
Assistant coach / Director of player development	Zack Schilawski
Assistant coach	Ade Taiwo
Video analysis and analytics coordinator	Declan Doherty

== Schedule ==
Date Time, TV	Rank^{#}	Opponent^{#}	Result	Record	Site (Attendance) City, State
Regular season
August 20*; 7:30 p.m., ACCNX		San Francisco	W 4–2	1–0–0	Spry Stadium (3,233); Winston-Salem, NC
August 23*; 7:00 p.m., ACCNX		VCU	T 0–0	1–0–1	Spry Stadium (1,621); Winston-Salem, NC
August 28*; 7:00 p.m., ESPN+		at No. 10 Akron	L 0–1	1–1–1	FirstEnergy Stadium (2,260); Akron, OH
August 31*; 6:00 p.m., ESPN+		at Bowling Green	W 1–0	2–1–1	Doyt L. Perry Stadium (536); Bowling Green, OH
September 5; 7:00 p.m., ACCNX		Duke	W 6–1	3–1–1 (1–0–0)	Spry Stadium (2,700); Winston-Salem, NC
September 8*; 7:00 p.m., ACCNX		USC Upstate	W 3–0	4–1–1	Spry Stadium (1,023); Winston-Salem, NC
September 13; 6:00 p.m., ACCNX		at Virginia Tech	L 1–2	4–2–1 (1–1–0)	Thompson Field (831); Blacksburg, VA
September 19; 7:00 p.m., ACCNX		Virginia	W 3–2	5–2–1 (2–1–0)	Spry Stadium (2,100); Winston-Salem, NC
September 25; 7:00 p.m., ACCN		at NC State	W 2–1	6–2–1 (3–1–0)	Dail Soccer Field (2,073); Raleigh, NC
September 29*; 7:00 p.m., ACCNX		Loyola Chicago	W 3–0	7–2–1	Spry Stadium (1,000); Winston-Salem, NC
October 2; 7:00 p.m., ACCNX		No. 1 SMU	L 0–2	7–3–1 (3–2–0)	Spry Stadium (3,515); Winston-Salem, NC
October 9; 7:00 p.m., ACCNX		at Boston College	W 2–1	8–3–1 (4–2–0)	Newton Campus Soccer Field (681); Chestnut Hill, MA
October 13*; 7:00 p.m., ACCNX	No. 23	UNC Asheville	W 3–1	9–3–1	Spry Stadium (939); Winston-Salem, NC
October 17; 7:00 p.m., ACCNX	No. 23	Syracuse	W 2–0	10–3–1 (5–2–0)	Spry Stadium (2,296); Winston-Salem, NC
October 20*; 7:00 p.m., ACCNX	No. 15	Queens	W 5–0	11–3–1	Spry Stadium (840); Winston-Salem, NC
October 24*; 7:00 p.m., FloCollege	No. 15	at Elon	T 0–0	11–3–2	Rudd Field (638); Elon, NC
October 30; 7:00 p.m., ACCNX	No. 16	at No. 3 Clemson	L 1–2	11–4–2 (5–3–0)	Riggs Field (4,389); Clemson, SC
ACC Tournament
November 4*; 6:00 p.m., ACCNX	(3) No. 15	(14) Boston College; First Round	T 1–1 ^{(6–5 PK)}	11–4–3	Spry Stadium (822); Winston-Salem, NC
November 8*; 2:00 p.m., ACCN	(3) No. 15	(11) NC State; Second Round			Spry Stadium; Winston-Salem, NC
*Non-conference game. ^{#}Rankings from United Soccer Coaches. (#) Tournament seedings in parentheses. All times are in Eastern.

== Goals record ==
Through November 4, 2026.

Rank	No.	Nat.	Po.	Name	Regular season	ACC Tournament	NCAA Tournament	Total
1	32	(United States)	MF	Tate Lorentz	5	0	0	5
2	13	(United States)	MF	Jeffrey White	4	0	0	4
2	14	(New Zealand)	FW	Joby Reid	4	0	0	4
4	20	(Liberia)	MF	Alfred Debah	3	0	0	3
4	23	(United States)	—	Chandler Young	3	0	0	3
4	24	(United States)	DF	Mason Sullivan	3	0	0	3
7	5	(United States)	DF	Daniel Krueger	1	1	0	2
7	9	(Canada)	FW	Pariss Mitchell	2	0	0	2
7	12	(United States)	MF	Jose Perez	2	0	0	2
7	16	(United States)	MF	Joel Torbic	2	0	0	2
7	21	(United States)	FW	Ethan Subachan	2	0	0	2
7	22	(United States)	FW	Nolan Tinsley	2	0	0	2
13	7	(Canada)	MF	Philip Biskupski	1	0	0	1
13	29	(United States)	MF	Oliver Kurnik	1	0	0	1
13	33	(United States)	DF	Ronnie Garcia	1	0	0	1
Total					36	1	0	37

== Disciplinary record ==
Through November 4, 2026. Does not include five cautions and one ejection issued to the Wake Forest bench.

Rank	No.	Nat.	Po.	Name	Regular Season			ACC Tournament			NCAA Tournament			Total		
Rank	No.	Nat.	Po.	Name	Yellow card	(yellow card) (yellow-red card)	Red card	Yellow card	(yellow card) (yellow-red card)	Red card	Yellow card	(yellow card) (yellow-red card)	Red card	Yellow card	(yellow card) (yellow-red card)	Red card
1	9	(Canada)	FW	Pariss Mitchell	6	0	0	0	0	0	0	0	0	6	0	0
2	8	(United States)	MF	David Ndong Nguema	4	0	0	0	0	0	0	0	0	4	0	0
2	32	(United States)	MF	Tate Lorentz	4	0	0	0	0	0	0	0	0	4	0	0
4	5	(United States)	DF	Daniel Krueger	2	0	0	1	0	0	0	0	0	3	0	0
4	14	(New Zealand)	FW	Joby Reid	3	0	0	0	0	0	0	0	0	3	0	0
6	16	(United States)	MF	Joel Torbic	2	0	0	0	0	0	0	0	0	2	0	0
7	3	(United States)	DF	Travis Smith Jr.	1	0	0	0	0	0	0	0	0	1	0	0
7	12	(United States)	MF	Jose Perez	1	0	0	0	0	0	0	0	0	1	0	0
7	13	(United States)	MF	Jeffrey White	1	0	0	0	0	0	0	0	0	1	0	0
7	18	(United States)	MF	Henry Rosenfeld	1	0	0	0	0	0	0	0	0	1	0	0
7	23	(United States)	—	Chandler Young	1	0	0	0	0	0	0	0	0	1	0	0
7	24	(United States)	DF	Mason Sullivan	0	0	0	1	0	0	0	0	0	1	0	0
7	33	(United States)	DF	Ronnie Garcia	1	0	0	0	0	0	0	0	0	1	0	0
Total					27	0	0	2	0	0	0	0	0	29	0	0

== Awards and honors ==
Recipient	Award	Date	Ref.
Jeffrey White	ACC Preseason Watchlist	August 12	
Tate Lorentz	TopDrawerSoccer Team of the Week – Honorable Mention	September 8	
Jeffrey White	TopDrawerSoccer Team of the Week – Honorable Mention	September 29	
Alfred Debah	TopDrawerSoccer Team of the Week	October 20	
Daniel Krueger	UniGol National Team of the Week	October 20	
Mason Sullivan	UniGol National Team of the Week	October 20	

== Rankings ==
Ranking movements Legend: ██ Increase in ranking ██ Decrease in ranking — = Not ranked RV = Received votes
	Week																
Poll	Pre	1	2	3	4	5	6	7	8	9	10	11	12	13	14	15	Final
United Soccer	—	—	—	RV	—	—	—	—	23	15	16	15		Not released			
TopDrawer Soccer	—	—	—	—	16	21	18	13	13	9	7	9	10				
College Soccer News	—	—	—	RV	RV	RV	RV	—	RV	22	14	16			Not released		
