= 2026 NCAA Division I men's soccer season =

American college soccer season

- Duration: August 20 – December 16, 2026
- Number of teams: 213
- Preseason No. 1: Washington

Statistics

Tournament
- Duration: November 22 – December 16, 2026

Men's College Cup
- Date: December 13–16, 2026
- Site: WakeMed Soccer Park Cary, NC

Seasons
- ← 2025 2027 →

The 2026 NCAA Division I men's soccer season is the 68th season of NCAA championship men's college soccer. The season began on August 20, 2026, and is scheduled to conclude with the 2026 NCAA Division I men's soccer championship game on December 16, 2026.

The Washington Huskies are the defending champions.

In May 2026, the NCAA Division I Men's Soccer Oversight Committee approved a proposed change to the soccer schedule. Under the new schedule, the season would be divided between spring and fall segments, with a winter break from late November until mid-February. The NCAA Tournament and College Cup would take place in the spring. The new schedule would take effect with the 2027–28 academic year.

However, in June 2026, the proposed schedule failed to gain the necessary approval of the Division I Cabinet. The Cabinet remanded the proposal to the Divison I Men's Soccer Oversight Committee, asking the committee to provide further clarity.

Following this review, the Cabinet reaffirmed the proposal in October, but the proposal secured only 67.4% of the weighted vote, with 75% required to avoid a 30-day rescission period. Goal reported that Pitt athletic director and Cabinet member Allen Greene voted against the proposal, and that Pitt men's soccer coach Jay Vidovich had not been informed of Greene's vote in advance. This was significant because if Greene had voted for the proposal, the weighted vote would have reached the 75% threshold. The rescission would be voted on by all full Division I members—even those without varsity men's soccer programs, with 241 votes needed for rescission. On November 6, the NCAA confirmed that the proposal had indeed been rescinded, with Goal reporting that 247 schools voted to rescind—with 106 of these votes coming from schools lacking men's soccer.

== Changes from 2025 ==
=== Coaching changes ===
The following coaching changes occurred during the 2025–26 offseason.

Program	Outgoing coach	Manner of departure	Date of vacancy (Note: When retirement at the end of the season was announced, the date of vacancy is the affected program's last game of the 2025 season.)	Incoming coach	Date of appointment	References
Bellarmine	Tim Chastonay	Retired	November 15, 2025	Matt Cannady	November 15, 2025	
Binghamton	Paul Marco	Retired	January 9, 2026	Tommy Moon (interim)	March 6, 2026	
Butler	Paul Snape	Resigned	November 14, 2025	Ian Sarachan	November 26, 2025	
Campbell	Dustin Fonder	Relieved of Duties	June 26, 2026	Ricky Davey	July 16, 2026	
Coastal Carolina	Shaun Docking	Retired	August 13, 2025	Adam Perron	November 11, 2025	
Dartmouth	Bo Oshoniyi	Contract not Renewed	November 18, 2025	Connor Klekota	December 19, 2025	
Furman	Doug Allison	Retired	December 12, 2025	Brandon Tucker	December 22, 2025	
Gardner–Webb	Scott Wells	Hired by Liberty	November 19, 2025	Jonathan Lagos	January 5, 2026	
George Washington	Craig Jones	Retired	November 1, 2025	Matt Watts	December 8, 2025	
Grand Canyon	George Kiefer	Hired by South Florida	December 8, 2025	Jamie Davies	December 18, 2025	
Hofstra	Richard Nuttall	Retired	November 30, 2025	Stephen Roche	January 1, 2026	
IU Indy	Sid van Druenen	Resigned	May 6, 2026	Keegan Boom	June 2, 2026	
Liberty	Kelly Findley	Retired	November 12, 2025	Scott Wells	November 19, 2025	
LIU	Michael Mordocco	Hired by Yale as Assistant	June 11, 2026	Nate Bell	June 25, 2026	
Loyola Chicago	Steve Bode	Amicable	December 18, 2025	Kevin Robson	December 22, 2025	
Navy	Tim O'Donohue	Contract not Renewed	November 12, 2025	John Hackworth	December 5, 2025	
North Florida	Jamie Davies	Hired by Grand Canyon	December 18, 2025	Marlon Montanella	December 18, 2025	
Northern Kentucky	Tom Poitras	resigns	November 20, 2025	Sean Teepen	December 11, 2025	
Pacific	Adam Reeves	Contract not Extended	November 17, 2025	Andres Ochoa	November 24, 2025	
Penn State	Jeff Cook	Resigned to take MLS position	November 21, 2025	Rob Dow	December 11, 2025	
Radford	Chris Barrett	Resigned	November 14, 2025	Andy Cormack	January 13, 2026	
South Florida	Bob Butehorn	Retired	November 20, 2025	George Kiefer	December 10, 2025	
Southern Indiana	Mat Santoro	Contract not Extended	January 21, 2026	Mads Kaiser	January 21, 2026	
Utah Valley	Kyle Beckerman	Resigned	November 15, 2025	Michael Chesler	November 25, 2025	
Vermont	Rob Dow	Hired by Penn State	December 11, 2025	Adrian Dubois	December 17, 2025	
Western Illinois	Eric Johnson	Retired	November 17, 2025	Kooten Johnson	December 15, 2025	
Winthrop	Daniel Ridenhour	Resigned	November 3, 2025	Dale Parker	January 5, 2026	

=== Conference realignment ===
The Mountain West Conference (MW) announced that it would be sponsoring men's soccer beginning in 2026.

The Pac-12 Conference reinstated soccer for the 2026 season, including four affiliate members from the Big West: California Baptist, Cal Poly, UC Riverside, and UC San Diego. They were joined by Gonzaga, Oregon State, and San Diego State, the first two of which competed in 2025 in the West Coast Conference, with San Diego State having played in the Western Athletic Conference (WAC). California Baptist had previously announced that it would move to the Big West for the 2026 season.

Meanwhile, the WAC reconfigured and rebranded as the United Athletic Conference, and no longer sponsors men's soccer. The destination conference for the 2025 WAC members is shown in the table below.

As a result of the above changes in conference sponsorship, 23 conferences will have automatic bids to the 2026 NCAA Division I men's soccer tournament.

Team	Conference in 2025	Conference in 2026
Air Force	WAC	MW
California Baptist	WAC	Pac-12
Cal Poly	Big West	Pac-12
Denver	Summit	WCC
Gonzaga	WCC	Pac-12
Grand Canyon	WAC	MW
Liberty	OVC	SoCon
Northern Illinois	MVC	Horizon
Oregon State	WCC	Pac-12
Saint Francis	NEC	PAC (D-III)
San Diego State	WAC	Pac-12
San Jose State	WAC	MW
UC Davis	Big West	MW
UC Riverside	Big West	Pac-12
UC San Diego	Big West	Pac-12
UNLV	WAC	MW
UTRGV	Independent	OVC
Utah Tech	WAC	MW
Utah Valley	WAC	Big West
West Florida	GSC (D-II)	ASUN

==== Changes for 2027 ====
Two members of the Big West/Pac-12 men's soccer alliance will leave the Big West for the WCC after the 2026–27 school year. Therefore, the 2026 season will be UC San Diego's only season in Pac-12 men's soccer, as well as UC Santa Barbara's last in Big West men's soccer. At the same time, Fairfield will leave the Metro Conference for the Coastal Athletic Association, and will be replaced by NEC member Le Moyne.

Team	Conference in 2026	Conference in 2027
Fairfield	Metro	CAA
Le Moyne	NEC	Metro
UC San Diego	Pac-12	WCC
UC Santa Barbara	Big West	WCC

== Other news ==
- May 27 – The Metro Atlantic Athletic Conference announced that it would rename itself as the Metro Conference effective July 1.
- June 23 – The NCAA Division I Cabinet unanimously approved a new age-based eligibility proposal for that division, which officially took effect with the end of the Cabinet's meeting the next day. Under the new model, students will have five years of athletic eligibility, and will be able to play in all five years. Athletes' eligibility clocks start with the earlier of (1) their full-time enrollment in a degree-granting institution or (2) the start of the academic year that immediately follows an individual's 19th birthday. Redshirting is no longer allowed, even for medical reasons; the only exceptions allowed for male athletes are for full-time military service or religious missions. Students enrolling full-time in college for the first time in 2026, plus those who had remaining eligibility under previous rules at the end of 2025–26, can use whichever model is most advantageous to them. Those who exhausted their eligibility under previous rules in 2025–26 will not receive any additional eligibility, even if they initially enrolled in 2022–23 (giving them four years of eligibility).
- June 24 – On the same day the new age-based eligibility model took effect, a group of 15 college basketball players, all of whom graduated from high school in 2022 and exhausted their eligibility under the previous rules in 2025–26, filed suit in Hamilton County, Ohio challenging the application of the new model to their high school cohort. Other suits on similar grounds were expected to be filed in other states.
- June 26 – The Coastal Athletic Association announced that Fairfield would join from the Metro Conference in July 2027.
- July 31 – Rulings in two separate court cases undercut the NCAA's planned "five for five" eligibility model as applied to 2022 high school graduates. First, a Tennessee state court judge granted a temporary injunction that allowed 19 basketball players in that class an extra season of eligibility. Several hours later, a federal judge in Colorado issued a preliminary injunction that applied to all members of the high school class of 2022 who had exhausted athletic eligibility, regardless of sport, and also provided those individuals an extra season of eligibility. The NCAA was expected to appeal.

== Season outlook ==
=== Preseason polls ===
United Soccer Coaches
Rank	Team
1	Washington
2	NC State
3	Furman
4	Saint Louis
5	Georgetown
6	Portland
7	Maryland
8	Princeton
9	Stanford
10	Bryant
11	Virginia
12	Akron
13	Vermont
14	UNCG
15	SMU
16	High Point
17	Marshall
18	San Diego
19	Oregon State
20	Hofstra
21	Grand Canyon
22	Indiana
23	West Virginia
24	UConn
25	Kansas City

TopDrawer Soccer
Rank	Team
1	Washington
2	Furman
3	Saint Louis
4	Portland
5	Georgetown
6	NC State
7	Maryland
8	Akron
9	High Point
10	Stanford
11	UNCG
12	San Diego
13	Princeton
14	SMU
15	Duke
16	Virginia
17	Cornell
18	UConn
19	Bryant
20	Denver
21	Marshall
22	Indiana
23	Kansas City
24	UCF
25	North Carolina

College Soccer News
Rank	Team
1	Washington
2	NC State
3	Georgetown
4	Maryland
5	Portland
6	Saint Louis
7	Furman
8	Stanford
9	Virginia
10	Princeton
11	Bryant
12	Akron
13	High Point
14	SMU
15	San Diego
16	Marshall
17	Indiana
18	UNCG
19	Vermont
20	North Carolina
21	Oregon State
22	West Virginia
23	Denver
24	Cornell
25	Duke

== Regular season ==
=== Major upsets ===
In this list, a "major upset" is defined as a game won by an unranked team that defeats a ranked team, or a team ranked 10 spots lower than the other team.

All rankings are from the United Soccer Coaches Poll. Home team is shown in italics.

Date	Winner	Score	Loser
August 20	No. 18 San Diego	2–1	No. 1 Washington
August 20	Clemson	4–1	No. 3 Furman
August 20	UCLA	2–1	No. 11 Virginia
August 20	Charlotte	3–0	No. 23 West Virginia
August 20	Syracuse	2–1	No. 24 UConn
August 23	UMass	3–1	No. 24 UConn
August 24	No. 15 SMU	4–0	No. 4 St. Louis
August 27	Furman	4–3	No. 19 Duke
August 27	FIU	2–1	No. 20 NC State
August 28	South Carolina	3–2	No. 16 Clemson
August 30	No. 25 Oregon State	4–3	No. 11 Washington
August 30	San Francisco	3–2	No. 15 Kansas City
August 31	Princeton	2–0	No. 3 Portland
September 11	Northwestern	4–0	No. 2 Maryland
September 11	Kansas City	3–1	No. 10 Michigan State
September 11	Rutgers	3–1	No. 11 UCLA
September 11	Notre Dame	1–0	No. 17 Clemson
September 11	Utah Valley	2–1	No. 20 Marshall
September 15	Rutgers	2–0	No. 11 Princeton
September 15	Pittsburgh	2–0	No. 17 Cornell
September 15	NC State	1–0	No. 23 UNC Wilmington
September 18	Rutgers	2–1	No. 3 Ohio State
September 19	Dartmouth	3–1	No. 18 Vermont
September 20	No. 20 Notre Dame	3–1	No. 1 Stanford
September 20	Oregon State	3–1	No. 25 UC Santa Barbara
September 21	Washington	4–0	No. 3 Ohio State
September 22	Charleston	2–1	No. 1 South Carolina
September 25	Virginia	3–2	No. 6 Stanford
September 25	Syracuse	1–0	No. 10 Notre Dame
September 25	Washington	4–1	No. 22 Rutgers
September 26	Dartmouth	1–0	No. 18 Princeton
September 27	Georgia Southern	3–1	No. 15 Old Dominion
October 2	Kentucky	4–2	No. 23 Old Dominion
October 3	UCLA	3–0	No. 8 Michigan State
October 3	California	2–0	No. 13 Notre Dame
October 9	Michigan State	2–1	No. 7 Maryland
October 9	Old Dominion	2–1	No. 15 West Virginia
October 10	Bryant	2–1	No. 24 Albany
October 10	Portland	5–4	No. 25 San Diego
October 11	NC State	3–0	No. 4 Kansas City
October 11	Tulsa	2–1	No. 8 Missouri State
October 13	Colgate	1–0	No. 19 Cornell
October 14	Cal State Bakersfield	1–0	No. 22 Oregon State
October 16	Rutgers	1–0	No. 2 Indiana
October 16	North Carolina	1–0	No. 7 Pittsburgh
October 17	Georgia State	2–1	No. 6 South Carolina
October 17	Cal Poly	4–3	No. 22 Oregon State
October 22	Tulsa	1–0	No. 20 Charlotte
October 24	Albany	1–0	No. 12 Vermont
October 24	Utah Valley	1–0	No. 21 Oregon State
October 25	UCF	3–2	No. 18 South Carolina
October 30	Rutgers	4–1	No. 8 Michigan State
October 31	Omaha	4–0	No. 5 Kansas City
October 31	UConn	2–1	No. 17 Xavier

=== Conference standings ===
2026 ACC men's soccer standings
	Conf.					Overall
Team	W		L		T	W		L		T
No. 1 SMU †	6	–	0	–	2	13	–	0	–	3
No. 5 Clemson	6	–	1	–	1	13	–	3	–	2
No. 20 Wake Forest	5	–	3	–	0	11	–	5	–	3
No. 13 Louisville	4	–	2	–	2	12	–	3	–	3
No. 21 Pittsburgh	4	–	2	–	2	9	–	4	–	4
Virginia Tech	4	–	2	–	2	8	–	6	–	3
No. 12 North Carolina	3	–	1	–	4	9	–	2	–	6
Notre Dame	4	–	4	–	0	7	–	5	–	4
Virginia	3	–	3	–	2	7	–	7	–	4
California	2	–	4	–	2	6	–	5	–	5
NC State	1	–	3	–	4	7	–	5	–	6
Stanford	1	–	4	–	3	9	–	5	–	3
Syracuse	1	–	5	–	2	8	–	7	–	3
Boston College	1	–	6	–	1	6	–	6	–	4
Duke	1	–	6	–	1	7	–	10	–	1
† – Conference champion ‡ – ACC tournament champion + – At-large invitation to the 2026 NCAA tournament; As of November 8, 2026; Rankings from United Soccer Coaches; Source:The ACC

2026 America East Conference men's soccer standings
	Conf.					Overall
Team	W		L		T	W		L		T
Albany †	5	–	2	–	0	10	–	4	–	1
Vermont	4	–	1	–	2	10	–	2	–	4
Bryant	4	–	1	–	2	12	–	2	–	4
NJIT	4	–	1	–	2	9	–	5	–	4
New Hampshire	2	–	3	–	2	7	–	6	–	4
Binghamton	1	–	3	–	3	2	–	9	–	6
UMass Lowell	1	–	5	–	1	5	–	7	–	3
UMBC	0	–	5	–	2	3	–	8	–	3
† – Conference champion ‡ – AmEast tournament champion + – At-large invitation to the 2026 NCAA tournament; As of November 7, 2026; Rankings from United Soccer Coaches; Source: America East

2026 American Conference men's soccer standings
	Conf.					Overall
Team	W		L		T	W		L		T
Tulsa †	5	–	1	–	2	8	–	4	–	4
No. 16 Missouri State †	5	–	1	–	2	12	–	1	–	3
Charlotte	4	–	2	–	2	9	–	3	–	4
Florida Atlantic	3	–	2	–	3	6	–	3	–	7
Memphis	2	–	2	–	4	8	–	4	–	5
FIU	2	–	2	–	4	7	–	5	–	5
UAB	2	–	3	–	3	5	–	5	–	5
Temple	1	–	5	–	2	2	–	10	–	4
South Florida	0	–	6	–	2	2	–	12	–	3
† – Conference champion ‡ – American tournament champion + – At-large invitation to the 2026 NCAA tournament; As of November 6, 2026; Rankings from United Soccer Coaches; Source: The American

2026 ASUN Conference men's soccer standings
	Conf.					Overall
Team	W		L		T	W		L		T
North Florida †	7	–	0	–	1	11	–	4	–	3
Central Arkansas	5	–	2	–	1	8	–	6	–	2
West Florida ^{#}	5	–	3	–	0	6	–	7	–	1
Stetson	3	–	4	–	1	5	–	8	–	3
Bellarmine	2	–	3	–	3	7	–	3	–	5
Queens	2	–	3	–	3	4	–	10	–	3
Jacksonville	2	–	4	–	2	7	–	6	–	2
Lipscomb	2	–	6	–	0	3	–	12	–	1
Florida Gulf Coast	1	–	4	–	3	5	–	7	–	4
† – Conference champion ‡ – 2026 ASUN tournament champion + – At-large invitation to the 2026 NCAA tournament ^{#} – Ineligible for post-season (In transition); As of October 31, 2026; Rankings from United Soccer Coaches; Source: ASUN

2026 Atlantic 10 Conference men's soccer standings
	Conf.					Overall
Team	W		L		T	W		L		T
Duquesne †	6	–	2	–	0	9	–	5	–	2
Saint Louis	5	–	1	–	2	7	–	4	–	5
George Mason	5	–	2	–	1	6	–	6	–	3
Rhode Island	5	–	3	–	0	8	–	9	–	0
Fordham	4	–	3	–	1	6	–	7	–	2
Davidson	4	–	3	–	1	6	–	5	–	5
Dayton	3	–	3	–	2	9	–	4	–	3
La Salle	3	–	3	–	2	7	–	7	–	3
Loyola Chicago	3	–	4	–	1	8	–	6	–	3
St. Bonaventure	2	–	4	–	2	5	–	7	–	4
VCU	2	–	5	–	1	2	–	10	–	3
Saint Joseph's	1	–	5	–	2	5	–	6	–	6
George Washington	0	–	5	–	3	4	–	8	–	4
† – Conference champion ‡ – 2026 Atlantic 10 tournament champion + – At-large invitation to the 2026 NCAA tournament; As of October 31, 2026; Rankings from United Soccer Coaches; Source: Atlantic 10

2026 Big East Conference men's soccer standings
	Conf.					Overall
Team	W		L		T	W		L		T
East
No. 2 Georgetown †	7	–	0	–	1	14	–	1	–	2
Seton Hall	4	–	2	–	2	7	–	4	–	6
UConn	4	–	3	–	1	8	–	7	–	3
St. John's	2	–	4	–	2	6	–	9	–	2
Providence	1	–	5	–	2	6	–	7	–	3
Villanova	0	–	7	–	1	5	–	9	–	3
Midwest
No. 8 Creighton †	4	–	1	–	3	12	–	1	–	5
No. 4 Akron †	4	–	1	–	3	11	–	1	–	4
Xavier	3	–	2	–	3	10	–	2	–	4
Butler	3	–	3	–	2	3	–	9	–	3
Marquette	3	–	5	–	0	10	–	6	–	1
DePaul	2	–	4	–	2	5	–	6	–	5
† – Division champion ‡ – 2026 Big East tournament champion + – At-large invitation to the 2026 NCAA tournament; As of November 6, 2026; Rankings from United Soccer Coaches; Source: Big East

2026 Big South Conference men's soccer standings
	Conf.					Overall
Team	W		L		T	W		L		T
High Point †	5	–	0	–	2	10	–	3	–	4
Gardner–Webb	5	–	1	–	1	9	–	4	–	2
UNC Asheville	3	–	3	–	1	9	–	6	–	2
Winthrop	3	–	3	–	1	6	–	9	–	3
Longwood	3	–	4	–	0	9	–	7	–	1
USC Upstate	3	–	4	–	0	6	–	12	–	0
Radford	2	–	3	–	2	5	–	7	–	4
Presbyterian	0	–	6	–	1	0	–	15	–	1
† – Conference champion ‡ – 2026 Big South tournament champion + – At-large invitation to the 2026 NCAA tournament; As of November 4, 2026; Rankings from United Soccer Coaches; Source: Big South

2026 Big Ten Conference men's soccer standings
	Conf.						Overall
Team	W		L		T	PCT	W		L		T	PCT
No. 3 Indiana ‍†‍‍	7	–	1	–	2	.800	14	–	1	–	3	.861
No. 11 Washington ‍‍‍	6	–	2	–	2	.700	10	–	4	–	3	.676
No. 15 Rutgers ‍‍‍	6	–	3	–	1	.650	8	–	6	–	2	.563
No. 22 Michigan State ‍‍‍	5	–	3	–	2	.600	10	–	4	–	3	.676
No. 9 Maryland ‍‍‍	5	–	4	–	1	.550	11	–	4	–	1	.719
No. 18 UCLA ‍‍‍	4	–	3	–	3	.550	9	–	3	–	5	.676
No. 24т Wisconsin ‍‍‍	3	–	3	–	4	.500	10	–	3	–	4	.706
Northwestern ‍‍‍	3	–	4	–	3	.450	6	–	6	–	4	.500
Ohio State ‍‍‍	3	–	6	–	1	.350	8	–	6	–	2	.563
Michigan ‍‍‍	0	–	6	–	4	.200	3	–	8	–	5	.344
Penn State ‍‍‍	0	–	7	–	3	.150	3	–	9	–	3	.300
† – Conference champion ‡ – 2026 B1G tournament champion y – Invited to the 2026 NCAA Tournament; As of November 4, 2026; Rankings from United Soccer Coaches; Source: Big Ten

2026 Big West Conference men's soccer standings
	Conf.					Overall
Team	W		L		T	W		L		T
Utah Valley †	5	–	1	–	0	10	–	2	–	3
UC Irvine	4	–	1	–	1	10	–	6	–	2
UCSB	3	–	1	–	2	9	–	5	–	4
Cal State Bakersfield	1	–	1	–	4	5	–	4	–	7
Sacramento State	1	–	3	–	2	5	–	10	–	2
CSUN	1	–	4	–	1	7	–	8	–	2
Cal State Fullerton	1	–	5	–	0	5	–	9	–	4
† – Conference champion ‡ – 2026 Big West tournament champion + – At-large invitation to the 2026 NCAA tournament; As of October 31, 2026; Rankings from United Soccer Coaches; Source: Big West

2026 Coastal Athletic Association men's soccer standings
	Conf.					Overall
Team	W		L		T	W		L		T
North
Stony Brook †	4	–	1	–	3	9	–	1	–	6
Hofstra †	4	–	1	–	3	9	–	4	–	4
Drexel	3	–	4	–	1	7	–	7	–	2
Northeastern	2	–	4	–	2	5	–	7	–	4
Monmouth	1	–	4	–	3	3	–	8	–	3
South
No. 23 UNCW †	7	–	0	–	1	11	–	2	–	2
Elon	3	–	1	–	4	9	–	2	–	6
Charleston	2	–	3	–	3	7	–	4	–	5
William & Mary	2	–	4	–	2	7	–	8	–	2
Campbell	1	–	7	–	0	1	–	13	–	2
† – Division champion ‡ – 2026 CAA tournament champion + – At-large invitation to the 2026 NCAA tournament; As of October 31, 2026; Rankings from United Soccer Coaches; Source: CAA

2026 Horizon League men's soccer standings
	Conf.					Overall
Team	W		L		T	W		L		T
Milwaukee †	5	–	1	–	4	7	–	4	–	6
Purdue Fort Wayne	5	–	2	–	3	7	–	4	–	3
Robert Morris	4	–	1	–	5	7	–	4	–	6
Northern Illinois	5	–	3	–	2	8	–	6	–	2
Wright State	5	–	3	–	2	7	–	7	–	3
Cleveland State	4	–	3	–	3	6	–	6	–	4
Oakland	2	–	2	–	6	3	–	6	–	7
Green Bay	3	–	4	–	3	4	–	9	–	4
Detroit Mercy	3	–	6	–	1	4	–	10	–	3
IU Indy	1	–	6	–	3	4	–	8	–	4
Northern Kentucky	1	–	7	–	2	1	–	13	–	3
† – Conference champion ‡ – 2026 Horizon tournament champion + – At-large invitation to the 2026 NCAA tournament; As of November 3, 2026; Rankings from United Soccer Coaches; Source: Horizon League

2026 Ivy League men's soccer standings
	Conf.					Overall
Team	W		L		T	W		L		T
No. 17 Cornell †	5	–	0	–	1	10	–	3	–	1
Penn	2	–	1	–	3	6	–	3	–	5
Yale	2	–	1	–	3	4	–	6	–	4
Princeton	2	–	3	–	1	7	–	4	–	4
Brown	2	–	3	–	1	7	–	5	–	3
Dartmouth	2	–	3	–	1	4	–	6	–	4
Harvard	2	–	3	–	1	4	–	7	–	3
Columbia	0	–	3	–	3	5	–	4	–	5
† – Conference champion ‡ – 2026 Ivy League tournament champion + – At-large invitation to the 2026 NCAA tournament; As of October 31, 2026; Rankings from United Soccer Coaches; Source: Ivy League

2026 Metro Conference men's soccer standings
	Conf.					Overall
Team	W		L		T	W		L		T
Fairfield †	8	–	2	–	0	10	–	3	–	3
Marist	6	–	2	–	2	8	–	3	–	5
Quinnipiac	5	–	3	–	2	7	–	6	–	2
Sacred Heart	4	–	2	–	4	6	–	5	–	7
Niagara	4	–	3	–	3	5	–	6	–	4
Merrimack	3	–	1	–	6	5	–	3	–	9
Iona	3	–	3	–	4	4	–	6	–	6
Siena	2	–	2	–	6	4	–	6	–	7
Rider	4	–	4	–	2	8	–	5	–	3
Saint Peter's	3	–	5	–	2	5	–	7	–	4
Mount St. Mary's	2	–	4	–	4	2	–	7	–	8
Manhattan	1	–	7	–	2	3	–	11	–	2
Canisius	1	–	8	–	1	2	–	13	–	1
† – Conference champion ‡ – 2026 Metro tournament champion + – At-large invitation to the 2026 NCAA tournament; As of November 4, 2026; Rankings from United Soccer Coaches; Source: Metro

2026 Missouri Valley Conference men's soccer standings
	Conf.					Overall
Team	W		L		T	W		L		T
Bowling Green †	5	–	1	–	0	9	–	6	–	2
Evansville †	5	–	1	–	0	7	–	8	–	2
Western Michigan	2	–	1	–	3	5	–	8	–	5
Belmont	2	–	2	–	2	6	–	6	–	4
UIC	1	–	3	–	2	4	–	7	–	4
Drake	1	–	4	–	1	5	–	7	–	4
Bradley	1	–	5	–	0	3	–	7	–	5
† – Conference champion ‡ – 2026 MVC Tournament champion + – At-large invitation to the 2026 NCAA tournament; As of November 4, 2026; Rankings from United Soccer Coaches; Source: MVC

2026 Mountain West Conference men's soccer standings
	Conf.					Overall
Team	W		L		T	W		L		T
Grand Canyon †	7	–	0	–	2	10	–	5	–	2
UNLV	5	–	3	–	1	9	–	5	–	3
San Jose State	3	–	4	–	2	6	–	8	–	3
Air Force	3	–	4	–	2	4	–	7	–	5
UC Davis	2	–	5	–	2	2	–	10	–	5
Utah Tech	2	–	6	–	1	3	–	12	–	2
† – Conference champion ‡ – 2026 MW tournament champion + – At-large invitation to the 2026 NCAA tournament; As of November 1, 2026; Rankings from United Soccer Coaches; Source: MW

2026 NEC men's soccer standings
	Conf.					Overall
Team	W		L		T	W		L		T
LIU †	6	–	1	–	1	6	–	7	–	1
FDU	5	–	1	–	2	11	–	3	–	3
Central Connecticut	4	–	2	–	2	6	–	8	–	2
Mercyhurst ^{#}	3	–	2	–	3	6	–	4	–	6
New Haven ^{#}	3	–	2	–	3	4	–	10	–	3
Le Moyne	3	–	3	–	2	7	–	5	–	4
Stonehill	3	–	4	–	1	5	–	9	–	3
Howard	1	–	6	–	1	4	–	13	–	1
Chicago State	0	–	7	–	1	0	–	15	–	1
† – Conference champion ‡ – 2026 NEC tournament champion + – At-large invitation to the 2026 NCAA tournament ^{#} – Ineligible for post-season (In transition); As of November 8, 2026; Rankings from United Soccer Coaches; Source: NEC

2026 Ohio Valley Conference men's soccer standings
	Conf.					Overall
Team	W		L		T	W		L		T
Lindenwood †	5	–	2	–	3	8	–	4	–	6
SIUE	5	–	3	–	2	7	–	7	–	3
UIW	5	–	3	–	2	6	–	7	–	3
HCU	4	–	3	–	3	6	–	7	–	5
Western Illinois	4	–	5	–	1	6	–	9	–	3
Eastern Illinois	3	–	5	–	2	4	–	9	–	4
UTRGV	2	–	4	–	4	4	–	6	–	4
Southern Indiana	3	–	6	–	1	3	–	10	–	4
† – Conference champion ‡ – 2026 Ohio Valley tournament champion + – At-large invitation to the 2026 NCAA tournament; As of November 1, 2026; Rankings from United Soccer Coaches; Source: OVC

2026 Pac-12 Conference men's soccer standings
	Conf.					Overall
Team	W		L		T	W		L		T
No. 24т Oregon State †	4	–	1	–	1	9	–	4	–	4
Cal Baptist	3	–	1	–	2	12	–	3	–	2
San Diego State	1	–	0	–	5	3	–	7	–	9
UC Riverside	2	–	2	–	2	5	–	7	–	5
UC San Diego	1	–	1	–	4	7	–	6	–	4
Cal Poly	1	–	3	–	2	6	–	7	–	5
Gonzaga	1	–	5	–	0	5	–	9	–	3
† – Conference champion ‡ – 2026 Pac-12 tournament champion + – At-large invitation to the 2026 NCAA tournament; As of October 31, 2026; Rankings from United Soccer Coaches; Source: Pac-12

2026 Patriot League men's soccer standings
	Conf.					Overall
Team	W		L		T	W		L		T
Boston U †	7	–	1	–	0	8	–	3	–	4
American	6	–	1	–	2	6	–	6	–	5
Bucknell	5	–	3	–	1	8	–	8	–	1
Lehigh	5	–	3	–	1	5	–	7	–	5
Lafayette	3	–	3	–	3	4	–	9	–	4
Loyola (MD)	3	–	4	–	2	4	–	10	–	3
Colgate	2	–	5	–	2	4	–	9	–	4
Navy	2	–	6	–	1	4	–	9	–	4
Army	2	–	6	–	1	3	–	8	–	4
Holy Cross	1	–	4	–	3	2	–	8	–	7
† – Conference champion ‡ – 2026 Patriot League tournament champion + – At-large invitation to the 2026 NCAA tournament; As of November 3, 2026; Rankings from United Soccer Coaches; Source: Patriot League

2026 Southern Conference men's soccer standings
	Conf.					Overall
Team	W		L		T	W		L		T
Furman †	3	–	1	–	2	7	–	3	–	6
Wofford †	3	–	1	–	2	8	–	4	–	4
UNC Greensboro	2	–	0	–	4	5	–	2	–	9
East Tennessee State	2	–	0	–	4	7	–	6	–	5
Liberty	3	–	3	–	0	6	–	7	–	2
VMI	1	–	5	–	0	6	–	12	–	1
Mercer	0	–	4	–	2	0	–	13	–	5
† – Conference champion ‡– 2026 SoCon tournament champion + – At-large invitation to the 2026 NCAA tournament; As of November 3, 2026; Rankings from United Soccer Coaches; Source: SoCon

2026 Summit League men's soccer standings
	Conf.					Overall
Team	W		L		T	W		L		T
No. 14 Kansas City †	4	–	1	–	0	11	–	3	–	2
Omaha	3	–	1	–	1	9	–	4	–	3
UMass	2	–	2	–	1	6	–	7	–	3
Oral Roberts	1	–	2	–	2	3	–	7	–	5
St. Thomas	1	–	3	–	1	5	–	8	–	3
Delaware	0	–	2	–	3	7	–	4	–	6
† – Conference champion ‡ – 2026 Summit League tournament champion + – At-large invitation to the 2026 NCAA tournament; As of October 31, 2026; Rankings from United Soccer Coaches; Source: Summit

2026 Sun Belt Conference men's soccer standings
	Conf.					Overall
Team	W		L		T	W		L		T
No. 7 West Virginia †	6	–	1	–	2	10	–	2	–	4
No. 10 Marshall †	6	–	1	–	2	10	–	2	–	4
UCF	5	–	3	–	1	9	–	4	–	3
James Madison	4	–	2	–	3	7	–	6	–	4
Coastal Carolina	4	–	3	–	2	6	–	6	–	4
South Carolina	3	–	4	–	2	10	–	2	–	5
Kentucky	3	–	4	–	2	3	–	9	–	4
Georgia Southern	2	–	5	–	2	6	–	6	–	4
Old Dominion	2	–	6	–	1	10	–	6	–	1
Georgia State	1	–	7	–	1	7	–	9	–	2
† – Conference champion ‡ – 2026 Sun Belt Conference tournament champion + – At-large invitation to the 2026 NCAA tournament; As of November 3, 2026; Rankings from United Soccer Coaches; Source: Sun Belt

2026 West Coast Conference men's soccer standings
	Conf.					Overall
Team	W		L		T	W		L		T
No. 6 Portland †	7	–	0	–	0	10	–	3	–	2
No. 19 San Diego	4	–	1	–	2	9	–	4	–	3
Denver	3	–	1	–	3	4	–	7	–	4
San Francisco	2	–	2	–	3	6	–	6	–	4
Seattle U	2	–	3	–	2	5	–	7	–	3
Pacific	2	–	3	–	2	3	–	10	–	4
Santa Clara	1	–	3	–	4	4	–	8	–	4
Loyola Marymount	1	–	5	–	1	2	–	9	–	3
Saint Mary's (CA)	0	–	4	–	3	2	–	9	–	6
† – Conference champion ‡ – 2026 WCC tournament champion + – At-large invitation to the 2026 NCAA tournament; As of October 31, 2026; Rankings from United Soccer Coaches; Source: WCC

== Postseason ==
=== Conference winners and tournaments ===
Conference	Regular Season Champion(s)	Tournament Winner	Conference Tournament	Tournament Dates	Tournament Venue (City)
ACC	SMU	North Carolina	2026 tournament	November 4–15	First Round and Quarterfinals: Campus sites, hosted by higher seed Semifinals and Final: WakeMed Soccer Park • Cary, North Carolina
America East	Albany	Bryant	2026 tournament	November 7–15	Campus sites, hosted by higher seed
American	Missouri State & Tulsa (Note: Top seed in conference tournament.)	Tulsa	2026 tournament	November 6–14	Quarterfinals: Campus sites, hosted by higher seed Semifinals and final: Hosted by regular-season champion
ASUN	North Florida		2026 tournament	November 7–14	Quarterfinals and semifinals: Campus sites, hosted by top two seeds Final: Hosted by top remaining seed
Atlantic 10	Duquesne	Saint Louis	2026 tournament	November 6–14	Campus sites, hosted by higher seed
Big East	East – Georgetown	Akron	2026 tournament	November 12–15	Maryland SoccerPlex • Boyds, Maryland
Big East	Midwest – Akron & Creighton	Akron	2026 tournament	November 12–15	Maryland SoccerPlex • Boyds, Maryland
Big South	High Point	Longwood	2026 tournament	November 4–14	Campus sites, hosted by higher seed
Big Ten	Indiana		2026 tournament	November 8–15	Quarterfinals and semifinals: Campus sites, hosted by top two seeds Final: Hosted by top remaining seed
Big West	Utah Valley	Cal State Bakersfield	2026 tournament	November 7–13	Campus sites, hosted by higher seed
CAA	North – Hofstra & Stony Brook	Charleston	2026 tournament	November 5–14	Campus sites, hosted by higher seed
CAA	South – UNC Wilmington	Charleston	2026 tournament	November 5–14	Campus sites, hosted by higher seed
Horizon	Milwaukee	Cleveland State	2026 tournament	November 8–14	Campus sites, hosted by higher seed
Ivy	Cornell		2026 tournament	November 12–15	Berman Field • Ithaca, New York
Metro	Fairfield	Sacred Heart	2026 tournament	November 7–14	Campus sites, hosted by higher seed
Missouri Valley	Evansville & Bowling Green	Bowling Green	2026 tournament	November 8–14	Campus sites, hosted by higher seed
Mountain West	Grand Canyon		2026 tournament	November 10–14	GCU Stadium • Phoenix, Arizona
NEC	LIU	Fairleigh Dickinson	2026 tournament	November 12–15	Campus sites, hosted by higher seed
OVC	Lindenwood	Houston Christian	2026 tournament	November 8–14	Harlen C. Hunter Stadium • St. Charles, Missouri
Pac-12	Oregon State		2026 tournament	November 7–14	Campus sites, hosted by higher seed
Patriot	Boston University	Lehigh	2026 tournament	November 7–14	Campus sites, hosted by higher seed
SoCon	Wofford & Furman	Liberty	2026 tournament	November 3–14	Campus sites, hosted by higher seed
The Summit	Kansas City	Omaha	2026 tournament	November 6–14	Quarterfinals: Campus sites, hosted by higher seed Semifinals and final: Hosted by regular-season champion
Sun Belt	Marshall & West Virginia	West Virginia	2026 tournament	November 8–15	Quarterfinals and semifinals: Campus sites, hosted by top two seeds Final: Hosted by top remaining seed
WCC	Portland		2026 tournament	November 11–14	Merlo Field • Portland, Oregon

== Awards and honors ==
=== Major player of the year awards ===
- Hermann Trophy: TBD
- TopDrawerSoccer.com National Player of the Year Award: TBD

=== Other major awards ===
- United Soccer Coaches College Coach of the Year: TBD
- NCAA Tournament MVP: TBD

=== Conference players and coaches of the year ===
Conference	Conference Player of the Year	Offensive Player of the Year (Note: Honorees are forwards unless otherwise indicated.)	Defensive Player of the Year (Note: Honorees are defenders unless otherwise indicated.)	Midfielder of the Year	Goalkeeper of the Year	Rookie of the Year	Coach of the Year
ACC	—N/a	Joschi Schelb, North Carolina	Enzo Panozzo, SMU	Jaylinn Mitchell, SMU & Jack Pymm, Stanford	Jonathan Evans, SMU	Jack Ottley, MF, Duke (Note: This conference's award is "Freshman of the Year" and restricted to players of that classification.)	Kevin Hudson, SMU
America East	—N/a	Diogo Rebelo, NJIT (Note: This conference's award is styled as "Striker of the Year".)	Shawn Tanaka, Albany (Note: This conference's award is styled as "Defender of the Year".)	Maximus Barboto, NJIT	Niklas Herceg, Vermont	Yuta Kimata, Albany	Albany (head coach: Trevor Gorman) (Note: The top coaching award in this conference is styled as "Coaching Staff of the Year" and presented to an entire staff, although the head coach is personally cited in the award announcement. The American Conference and Missouri Valley Conference cite each member of the winning staff individually.)
American	—N/a	Santiago Possu, FIU	Harris O'Connor, Missouri State	Luc Achermann-Stanfield, Tulsa	Carlito Saylon, Tulsa	Tim Pusback, UAB	Missouri State (head coach: Michael Seabolt); Tulsa (head coach: Tom McIntosh)
ASUN	Vaclav Kozeny, MF, Central Arkansas	—N/a	Rafa Rios, North Florida	—N/a	Merrick Cook, Central Arkansas	Junior Essengue, DF, Stetson	Bill Elliott, West Florida
Atlantic 10	—N/a	Cooper Lijewski, Dayton	Luke Adams, Saint Louis	Braden Seel, Dayton	Sam Coss, Duquesne	Pablo Martinez, MF, Dayton	Chase Brooks, Duquesne
Big East	—N/a	Mitchell Baker, Georgetown	Matthew Reed, Creighton	Matthew Van Horn, Georgetown	Jonny Mennell, Georgetown	Terrance Reynolds, MF, Georgetown	Georgetown (head coach: Brian Wiese)
Big Ten	—N/a	Zach Ramsey, Washington	Harrison Bertos, Washington	Alex Hall, Washington	Michal Mroz, Indiana	Rodrigo Neri, FW, Maryland	Todd Yeagley, Indiana
Big South	—N/a	Daniel Lugo, High Point	Noah Behrmann, High Point	Noel Zimbeva, Radford	Josh Caron, High Point & Lucca Barros, UNC Asheville	Freshman: Nick Sarantakos, F, High Point; Newcomer: Tim Kreuzpeintner, F, Gardner–Webb (Note: This conference presents separate awards for Freshman of the Year and Newcomer of the Year. The latter is open to any player in his first season of conference competition, regardless of academic classification.)	High Point (head coach: Zach Haines)
Big West	—N/a	Zac Giles, Sacramento State	Brady Treinen, UC Irvine	Jose de la Torre, Cal State Fullerton	Scott Williams, UC Irvine	Oliver Watts, MF, Utah Valley	Michael Chesler, Utah Valley
CAA	Dominik Renz, Elon	—N/a	Jake Roberts, UNC Wilmington	Alex Fleury, Stony Brook	—N/a	Cameron Keay, UNC Wilmington	Aidan Heaney, UNC Wilmington
Horizon	Tom Mertz, Cleveland State	Brandon Razo, Purdue Fort Wayne	Jack Wagner, Milwaukee	—N/a	Carson Pridie, Milwaukee	Domenic Ruggiero, FW, Cleveland State	Kris Kelderman, Milwaukee
Ivy	—N/a	Connor Miller, Cornell	Connor Dawson, Penn	—N/a	—N/a	Andrew Miles, Cornell	Cornell (head coach: John Smith)
Metro	—N/a	Taehyeon Lim, Quinnipiac (Note: The Metro's award in this category is styled as "Golden Boot".)	Jett Aktan, Fairfield	—N/a	Evan Chomow, Fairfield (Note: The Metro's award in this category is styled as "Golden Glove".)	Ignacio Manzanares, Iona	Krystian Witkowski, Fairfield
Missouri Valley	Pablo Calvete, Evansville	Devin Shepherd, Evansville (Note: This conference's award is styled as "Forward of the Year".)	Etienne Ravelli, Evansville	Paul Claes Nielsen, Belmont	Jason Ball, Bowling Green	Leon De Ciccio, Belmont	Bowling Green (head coach: Eric Nichols)
Mountain West	—N/a	Jorge Lopez, Grand Canyon & Maxim Scordo, UNLV	Manolo Vazquez, UNLV	—N/a	Ronin Axelson, San Jose State & Beltran Fernandez, Grand Canyon	Arnau Camaño, FW, Grand Canyon	Jamie Davies, Grand Canyon
Northeast	Santiago Marin Gutiérrez, Central Connecticut	—N/a	Miguel Gonzalez, Central Connecticut	—N/a	Samuel Reine, LIU	Matheus Guimaraes, New Haven	Nate Bell, LIU
OVC	—N/a	Diego Robles, UIW	Luke Neely, Lindenwood	Ricardo Garcia, Houston Christian	Quinn Closson, Lindenwood	Javaun Mills, MF, Lindenwood	Kris Bertsch, Lindenwood; Kiki Lara, UIW
Pac-12	—N/a	Wyatt Borso, Oregon State	William Lawson, Cal Baptist	Stavros Charalampous, Cal Baptist & Oliver Hernandez Parra, Oregon State	Chema Preciado, Gonzaga	John Koutelieris, MF, Oregon State & Justin Ojo, FW, Cal Baptist	Jarred Brookins, Oregon State
Patriot	—N/a	Andrea Di Blasio, Boston University	Ian Webb-Johnson, American	Tyler Flynn, Loyola Maryland	Ben Alexander, Boston University	Jack Illig, MF, Navy	Boston University (head coach: Kevin Nylen)
SoCon	Wilfer Bustamante, FW, Furman	—N/a	—N/a	—N/a	Seth Wilson, UNC Greensboro	Keaviano Francis, MF, UNC Greensboro	Ryan Osborne, Wofford
Summit	—N/a	Italo Jenkins, Omaha	Bryson Gosch, Kansas City	Mark Ramarola, Kansas City	Moritz Krenc, St. Thomas	Mark Ramarola, Kansas City	Ryan Pore, Kansas City
Sun Belt	Drew Hansen, UCF	Broden Beorlegui, Georgia Southern	Mika Habel, South Carolina	—N/a	Toby Mawer, West Virginia	Freshman: Broden Beorlegui, FW, Georgia Southern; Newcomer: Kanta Ishii, DF, West Virginia	Dan Stratford, West Virginia
WCC	—N/a	David Ajagbe, Portland	Nikos Clarke-Tosczak, Portland	Joe Highfield, Portland	Miguel-Angel Hernandez, Portland	Xavier Cisneros, FW, Pacific	Nick Carlin-Voigt, Portland

== See also ==
- 2026 NCAA Division I women's soccer season
