= 2026 UConn Huskies men's soccer team =

American college soccer season

2026 UConn Huskies men's soccer
- Conference: Big East Conference
- Record: 8–7–3 (4–3–1 Big East)
- Head coach: Chris Gbandi (5th season)
- Assistant coaches: Stefan Defregger; Kamali Webson; Robbie Montanaro
- Home stadium: Joseph J. Morrone Stadium

2026 Big East Conference men's soccer standings
	Conf.					Overall
Team	W		L		T	W		L		T
East
No. 1 Georgetown †	7	–	0	–	0	14	–	1	–	1
UConn	4	–	3	–	0	8	–	7	–	2
Seton Hall	3	–	2	–	2	6	–	4	–	6
St. John's	2	–	3	–	2	6	–	8	–	2
Providence	0	–	5	–	2	5	–	7	–	3
Villanova	0	–	6	–	1	5	–	8	–	3
Midwest
No. 10 Creighton	3	–	1	–	3	11	–	1	–	5
No. 5 Akron	3	–	1	–	3	10	–	1	–	4
Xavier	2	–	2	–	3	9	–	2	–	4
Marquette	3	–	4	–	0	10	–	5	–	1
Butler	3	–	2	–	2	3	–	8	–	3
DePaul	2	–	3	–	2	5	–	5	–	5
† – Division champion ‡ – 2026 Big East tournament champion + – At-large invitation to the 2026 NCAA tournament; As of November 3, 2026; Rankings from United Soccer Coaches; Source: Big East

The 2026 UConn Huskies men's soccer team represents the University of Connecticut during the 2026 NCAA Division I men's soccer season. The Huskies are led by head coach Chris Gbandi, in his fifth season. They play their home games at Joseph J. Morrone Stadium in Storrs, Connecticut, and compete in the Big East Conference.

Coming off a run to the round of 16 of the NCAA Tournament, UConn began the season ranked 24th in the United Soccer Coaches preseason poll and was picked to finish second in the Big East's East Division behind Georgetown. Goalkeeper Kyle Durham, who led the nation in saves in 2025, was named the conference's Preseason Goalkeeper of the Year. Durham had been selected by San Diego FC in the third round of the 2026 MLS SuperDraft. The Huskies lost their first three matches, to Syracuse, at UMass and to Fairfield, before earning their first win, 4–1 over Western Michigan in front of a sold-out crowd. UConn opened Big East play with a 2–1 home loss to Seton Hall after conceding twice in the first 15 minutes, and earned its first conference win, 1–0, at Villanova on October 2. A match at St. John's was postponed from September 26 to October 27 because of forecast weather; the Huskies lost it 3–2. UConn won three of its four league matches in late October: 1–0 at Marquette, 2–0 over Providence behind two goals from Alfonso Arredondo, and 2–1 at seventeenth-ranked Xavier on second-half goals from Preston Alessio and Elijah Langford.

The Huskies finished the regular season 8–7–3 and 4–3–1 in Big East play, closing with a 2–2 draw against top-ranked Georgetown on senior night. Only the two division champions and the next two teams by points qualified for the four-team Big East Tournament, and UConn was not among the four seeds. Langford led the team with eight goals.

== Previous season ==
The Huskies finished the 2025 season 12–5–4. As the third seed in the Big East Tournament, UConn defeated second-seeded Akron 2–1 in the semifinals and lost 3–1 to Georgetown in the final. The Huskies received an at-large bid to the NCAA Tournament, the program's first since 2018, and the thirteenth national seed, its first top-16 seed since 2012. After a first-round bye, UConn beat Cornell 3–1 behind two goals from Austin Brummett, then lost to fourth-seeded Maryland in the round of 16. Three Huskies were selected in the 2026 MLS SuperDraft: Ayoub Lajhar by FC Cincinnati, Durham by San Diego FC and Brummett by Houston Dynamo FC.

== Player movement ==
=== Players leaving ===
Departures
Name	Number	Pos.	Height	Weight	Year	Hometown	Reason for Departure
Adam Carter	1	GK	6'3"	188	Graduate Student	Clemmons, North Carolina	Graduated
Khaya Roudette-Gregory	6	DF	6'5"	230	Senior	London, England	Graduated
Nicolas Tomerius	7	MF	5'9"	155	Senior	Berlin, Germany	Graduated
Marco Valentic	8	MF	5'9"	145	Senior	Kirtland, Ohio	Graduated
Austin Brummett	9	FW	6'0"	195	Senior	Bow, New Hampshire	Graduated; drafted by Houston Dynamo FC
Sabri Hanni	10	MF	5'7"	165	Redshirt Sophomore	Paris, France	—
Balthazar Saunders	11	MF	5'11"	175	Graduate Student	Brooklyn, New York	Graduated
Xavier Pérez	15	MF	6'3"	172	Freshman	Barcelona, Spain	—
Edward Wester	17	FW	5'11"	158	Freshman	Stockholm, Sweden	—
Charlie Holmes	18	FW	6'3"	175	Senior	Seattle, Washington	Graduated
Ayoub Lajhar	19	DF	6'0"	168	Junior	Brattleboro, Vermont	Drafted by FC Cincinnati
Elijah Hope	20	DF	5'10"	—	Senior	Clifton, New Jersey	Graduated
Maquan Aldridge	21	FW	6'0"	185	Junior	Kingston, Jamaica	—
Giovanni Dennis	29	MF	5'11"	145	Sophomore	Tampa, Florida	—

=== Players arriving ===
==== Incoming transfers ====
Incoming transfers
Name	Number	Pos.	Height	Weight	Year	Hometown	Previous School
Brayden Strait	2	DF	6'3"	195	Senior	Huntsville, Alabama	Lipscomb
Abel Ador	6	DF	6'3"	180	Junior	Xikpo, Ghana	Monroe
Steve Delacour	8	MF	5'9"	134	Senior	Alençon, France	—
Elijah Langford	9	FW	6'4"	190	Senior	Edmond, Oklahoma	Point Loma
Rashid Nacif Joffre	10	FW	5'11"	178	Senior	Santa Cruz, Bolivia	Potomac State College
Aidan Sheppela	11	MF	5'11"	165	Junior	Brentwood, New Hampshire	Maryland
Jorge Sandoval	14	MF	5'7"	165	Junior	Gainesville, Georgia	North Georgia
Yotaro Furutani	15	MF	5'9"	155	Junior	Tokyo, Japan	Monroe
Jacques Mason	16	MF	5'10"	166	Sophomore	Monrovia, Liberia	Wilmington
Szymon Sokolnicki	19	DF	6'4"	187	Sophomore	Warsaw, Poland	Lincoln Memorial

==== Recruiting class ====
Name	Nat.	Hometown	High school / Club
Grant Emerhi; MF	USA	Mansfield, Massachusetts	YSC Academy
Justin Hubbard; FW	USA	The Woodlands, Texas	Tomball High School
Lucas DePinho; MF	USA	Clark, New Jersey	Arthur L. Johnson High School
Owen Bland; DF	USA	Murfreesboro, Tennessee	Rutherford County Virtual School
Summerville Beckford; GK	USA	Ossining, New York	Ossining High School

== Squad ==
=== Roster ===
As of November 6, 2026

Note: Flags indicate national team as defined under FIFA eligibility rules; some limited exceptions apply. Players may hold more than one non-FIFA nationality.

No.	Pos.	Nation	Player
0	GK	USA	Joe Grossman
00	GK	USA	Justin Hess
1	GK	USA	Summerville Beckford
2	DF	USA	Brayden Strait
3	DF	GER	Maxim Emmerling
4	MF	SWE	Max Gummesson
5	DF	USA	Alex Tupay
6	DF	GHA	Abel Ador
7	MF	USA	Matias Paredes
8	MF	FRA	Steve Delacour
9	FW	USA	Elijah Langford
10	FW	BOL	Rashid Nacif Joffre
11	MF	USA	Aidan Sheppela
12	FW	USA	Evan Pickering
13	GK	USA	Kyle Durham

No.	Pos.	Nation	Player
14	MF	USA	Jorge Sandoval
15	MF	JPN	Yotaro Furutani
16	MF	LBR	Jacques Mason
17	MF	USA	Grant Emerhi
18	FW	ESP	Alfonso Arredondo
19	DF	POL	Szymon Sokolnicki
21	MF	USA	Lucas DePinho
22	DF	FRA	Johan Hamel
23	MF	USA	Preston Alessio
24	DF	USA	Owen Bland
25	MF	USA	Mateo DePinho
26	DF	USA	Sebastian Francis
27	MF	USA	Jack Ryan
29	FW	USA	Justin Hubbard

=== Team management ===
Position	Staff
Head coach	Chris Gbandi
Associate head coach	Stefan Defregger
Assistant coach	Kamali Webson
Assistant coach	Robbie Montanaro

== Schedule ==
Date Time, TV	Rank^{#}	Opponent^{#}	Result	Record	Site (Attendance) City, State
Regular season
August 20*; 5:00 p.m., UConn+	No. 24	Syracuse	L 1–2	0–1–0	Joseph J. Morrone Stadium (1,547); Storrs, CT
August 23*; 1:00 p.m.	No. 24	at UMass	L 1–3	0–2–0	Rudd Field (386); Amherst, MA
August 27*; 6:00 p.m., UConn+		Fairfield	L 0–1	0–3–0	Joseph J. Morrone Stadium (1,256); Storrs, CT
August 30*; 7:00 p.m., UConn+		Western Michigan; Student Traditions Night	W 4–1	1–3–0	Joseph J. Morrone Stadium (4,207); Storrs, CT
September 3*; 7:30 p.m., UConn+		Brown	W 2–1	2–3–0	Joseph J. Morrone Stadium (1,423); Storrs, CT
September 6*; 5:00 p.m., UConn+		Fisher College	W 6–1	3–3–0	Joseph J. Morrone Stadium (1,333); Storrs, CT
September 9*; 6:00 p.m., UConn+		Sacred Heart; Huskies & Heroes	T 1–1	3–3–1	Joseph J. Morrone Stadium (854); Storrs, CT
September 12*; 1:00 p.m., ESPN+		at Harvard	T 2–2	3–3–2	Jordan Field (900); Cambridge, MA
September 18; 6:00 p.m., ESPN+		Seton Hall	L 1–2	3–4–2 (0–1–0)	Joseph J. Morrone Stadium (3,052); Storrs, CT
September 22*; 6:00 p.m., UConn+		Siena	W 3–1	4–4–2	Joseph J. Morrone Stadium (633); Storrs, CT
October 2; 3:00 p.m., ESPN+		at Villanova	W 1–0	5–4–2 (1–1–0)	Higgins Soccer Complex; Villanova, PA
October 6*; 6:00 p.m., UConn+		Bryant	L 0–1	5–5–2	Joseph J. Morrone Stadium (676); Storrs, CT
October 10; 6:00 p.m., ESPN+		DePaul	L 1–2	5–6–2 (1–2–0)	Joseph J. Morrone Stadium (3,216); Storrs, CT
October 16; 7:00 p.m., ESPN+		at Marquette	W 1–0	6–6–2 (2–2–0)	Valley Fields (193); Milwaukee, WI
October 24; 6:00 p.m., ESPN+		Providence; Junior Husky Club Day	W 2–0	7–6–2 (3–2–0)	Joseph J. Morrone Stadium (3,300); Storrs, CT
October 27; 6:00 p.m., ESPN+		at St. John's	L 2–3	7–7–2 (3–3–0)	Cox Family Field at Belson Stadium (372); Queens, NY
October 31; 6:30 p.m., ESPN+		at No. 17 Xavier	W 2–1	8–7–2 (4–3–0)	Corcoran Field (234); Cincinnati, OH
November 6; 7:00 p.m., ESPN+		No. 1 Georgetown; Senior Night	T 2–2	8–7–3 (4–3–1)	Joseph J. Morrone Stadium (2,571); Storrs, CT
*Non-conference game. ^{#}Rankings from United Soccer Coaches. (#) Tournament seedings in parentheses. All times are in Eastern.

== Goals record ==
Through November 6, 2026.

Rank	No.	Nat.	Po.	Name	Regular season	Big East Tournament	NCAA Tournament	Total
1	9	(United States)	FW	Elijah Langford	8	0	0	8
2	23	(United States)	MF	Preston Alessio	6	0	0	6
3	12	(United States)	FW	Evan Pickering	4	0	0	4
4	18	(Spain)	FW	Alfonso Arredondo	3	0	0	3
5	11	(United States)	MF	Aidan Sheppela	2	0	0	2
5	21	(United States)	MF	Lucas DePinho	2	0	0	2
5	29	(United States)	FW	Justin Hubbard	2	0	0	2
8	4	(Sweden)	MF	Max Gummesson	1	0	0	1
8	10	(Bolivia)	FW	Rashid Nacif Joffre	1	0	0	1
8	14	(United States)	MF	Jorge Sandoval	1	0	0	1
8	17	(United States)	MF	Grant Emerhi	1	0	0	1
Own goals					1	0	0	1
Total					32	0	0	32

== Disciplinary record ==
Through November 6, 2026. Team totals include two additional cautions not credited to individual players.

Rank	No.	Nat.	Po.	Name	Regular Season			Big East Tournament			NCAA Tournament			Total		
Rank	No.	Nat.	Po.	Name	Yellow card	(yellow card) (yellow-red card)	Red card	Yellow card	(yellow card) (yellow-red card)	Red card	Yellow card	(yellow card) (yellow-red card)	Red card	Yellow card	(yellow card) (yellow-red card)	Red card
1	6	(Ghana)	DF	Abel Ador	6	0	0	0	0	0	0	0	0	6	0	0
2	9	(United States)	FW	Elijah Langford	4	0	0	0	0	0	0	0	0	4	0	0
3	4	(Sweden)	MF	Max Gummesson	3	0	0	0	0	0	0	0	0	3	0	0
3	18	(Spain)	FW	Alfonso Arredondo	3	0	0	0	0	0	0	0	0	3	0	0
3	21	(United States)	MF	Lucas DePinho	3	0	0	0	0	0	0	0	0	3	0	0
3	24	(United States)	DF	Owen Bland	3	0	0	0	0	0	0	0	0	3	0	0
7	12	(United States)	FW	Evan Pickering	1	0	1	0	0	0	0	0	0	1	0	1
7	16	(Liberia)	MF	Jacques Mason	1	0	1	0	0	0	0	0	0	1	0	1
9	2	(United States)	DF	Brayden Strait	2	0	0	0	0	0	0	0	0	2	0	0
9	19	(Poland)	DF	Szymon Sokolnicki	2	0	0	0	0	0	0	0	0	2	0	0
9	23	(United States)	MF	Preston Alessio	2	0	0	0	0	0	0	0	0	2	0	0
12	5	(United States)	DF	Alex Tupay	1	0	0	0	0	0	0	0	0	1	0	0
12	8	(France)	MF	Steve Delacour	1	0	0	0	0	0	0	0	0	1	0	0
12	10	(Bolivia)	FW	Rashid Nacif Joffre	1	0	0	0	0	0	0	0	0	1	0	0
12	17	(United States)	MF	Grant Emerhi	1	0	0	0	0	0	0	0	0	1	0	0
Total					34	0	2	0	0	0	0	0	0	34	0	2

== Awards and honors ==
Recipient	Award	Date	Ref.
Kyle Durham	Big East Preseason Goalkeeper of the Year	August 11	
Kyle Durham	Big East Goalkeeper of the Week	October 19	
Kyle Durham	Big East Goalkeeper of the Week	October 26	
Alfonso Arredondo	Big East Weekly Honor Roll	October 26	
Elijah Langford	Big East Weekly Honor Roll	November 2	

== Rankings ==
Ranking movements Legend: ██ Increase in ranking ██ Decrease in ranking — = Not ranked RV = Received votes
	Week																
Poll	Pre	1	2	3	4	5	6	7	8	9	10	11	12	13	14	15	Final
United Soccer	24	—	—	—	—	—	—	—	—	—	—	—		Not released			
TopDrawer Soccer	18	18	—	—	—	—	—	—	—	—	—	—	—				
College Soccer News	RV	RV	—	—	—	—	—	—	—	—	—	—			Not released		
