= 2026 Saint Louis Billikens men's soccer team =

American college soccer season

2026 Saint Louis Billikens men's soccer
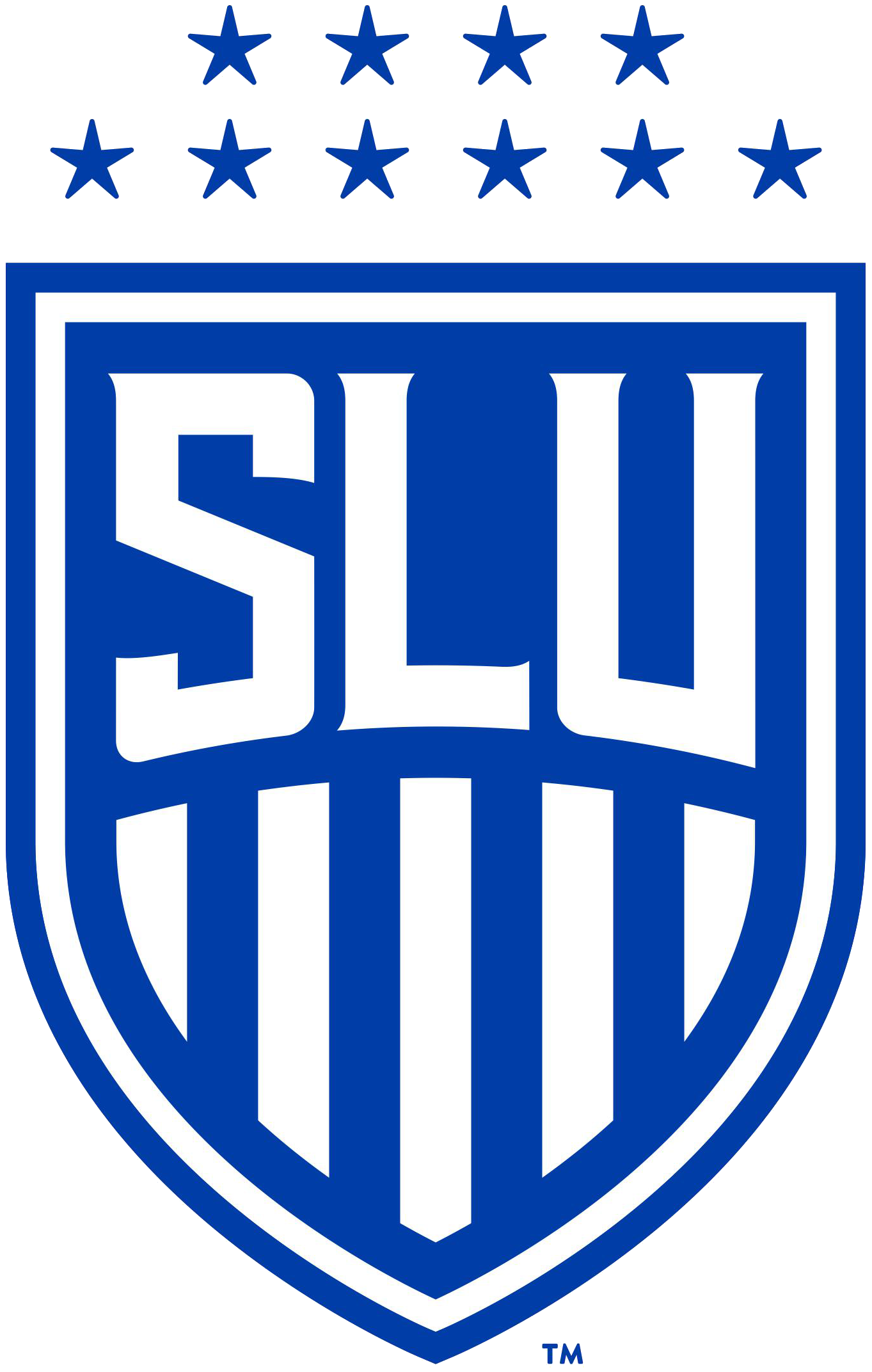
- Conference: Atlantic 10 Conference
- Record: 8–4–5 (5–1–2 A-10)
- Head coach: Kevin Kalish (9th season)
- Assistant coaches: Kevin Stoll; Jack Roberts
- Goalkeepers coach: Carlos Tofern
- Home stadium: Hermann Stadium

2026 Atlantic 10 Conference men's soccer standings
	Conf.					Overall
Team	W		L		T	W		L		T
Duquesne †	6	–	2	–	0	9	–	5	–	2
Saint Louis	5	–	1	–	2	7	–	4	–	5
George Mason	5	–	2	–	1	6	–	6	–	3
Rhode Island	5	–	3	–	0	8	–	9	–	0
Fordham	4	–	3	–	1	6	–	7	–	2
Davidson	4	–	3	–	1	6	–	5	–	5
Dayton	3	–	3	–	2	9	–	4	–	3
La Salle	3	–	3	–	2	7	–	7	–	3
Loyola Chicago	3	–	4	–	1	8	–	6	–	3
St. Bonaventure	2	–	4	–	2	5	–	7	–	4
VCU	2	–	5	–	1	2	–	10	–	3
Saint Joseph's	1	–	5	–	2	5	–	6	–	6
George Washington	0	–	5	–	3	4	–	8	–	4
† – Conference champion ‡ – 2026 Atlantic 10 tournament champion + – At-large invitation to the 2026 NCAA tournament; As of October 31, 2026; Rankings from United Soccer Coaches; Source: Atlantic 10

The 2026 Saint Louis Billikens men's soccer team represents Saint Louis University during the 2026 NCAA Division I men's soccer season. The Billikens are led by head coach Kevin Kalish, in his ninth season. They play their home games at Hermann Stadium in St. Louis, Missouri. This is the team's 68th season playing organized men's college soccer and their 22nd playing in the Atlantic 10 Conference.

Coming off a run to the College Cup, the Billikens began the season ranked fourth in the United Soccer Coaches preseason poll and were the unanimous pick to win the Atlantic 10 in the conference's preseason coaches' poll. They opened with a 4–0 win over Seattle, their most goals in a season opener since 2004, but lost 4–0 at home to fifteenth-ranked SMU four days later. After falling to eighth, the Billikens dropped out of the rankings following a 1–1 draw at Notre Dame. Losses to SIUE in the Bronze Boot match and to fourteenth-ranked Akron, who scored the winner in the 85th minute, left them 2–3–1 before Atlantic 10 play. The Billikens went unbeaten in their final four conference matches (3–0–1), including a 3–2 comeback win at La Salle with two goals in the final eight minutes. In the regular-season finale at Davidson, Tanner Anderson's 89th-minute goal put them in position to clinch the conference title, but Davidson equalized 23 seconds later and the match ended 1–1.

The Billikens finished the regular season 7–4–5 and 5–1–2 in Atlantic 10 play to finish in second place, one point behind regular-season champion Duquesne. Anderson leads the team with seven goals.

== Previous season ==
The Billikens finished the 2025 season 13–3–8, winning both the Atlantic 10 regular-season and tournament titles. They beat Dayton 5–4 on penalty kicks in the Atlantic 10 Tournament final and made the program's 52nd appearance in the NCAA Tournament, the most in the tournament's history. In the NCAA Tournament, Saint Louis came back from 2–0 down at halftime to beat Akron 3–2 in the Quarterfinals and reach its first College Cup since 1997. The Billikens lost 2–1 to NC State in the College Cup semifinals. They were ranked fourth in the final United Soccer Coaches poll, their highest final ranking since 1997.

== Player movement ==
=== Players leaving ===
Departures
Name	Number	Pos.	Height	Year	Hometown	Reason for Departure
Quinten Blair	4	DF	6'0"	Graduate Student	Shawnee, Kansas	Graduated
Abdoul Karim Pare	7	FW	5'7"	Graduate Student	Abidjan, Ivory Coast	Graduated
Draven Barnett	8	MF	5'9"	Senior	Springfield, Missouri	Graduated
Braydon Sellers	10	MF	5'11"	Redshirt Freshman	St. Louis, Missouri	Transferred to Louisville
Grady Easton	14	DF	6'3"	Graduate Student	The Woodlands, Texas	Graduated
Braden Benyr	16	MF	6'0"	Freshman	Swansea, Illinois	Transferred to Butler
Cole Ross	25	DF	5'10"	Redshirt Junior	St. Louis, Missouri	—
Jeremi Abonnel	28	GK	6'0"	Graduate Student	Aix-en-Provence, France	Graduated
Marcus Steinhaeuser	30	GK	6'4"	Freshman	Miami, Florida	—

Forward Ryan Belal, who transferred from Wake Forest, was announced as part of the 2026 recruiting class but does not appear on the 2026 roster.

=== Players arriving ===
==== Incoming transfers ====
Incoming transfers
Name	Number	Pos.	Height	Year	Hometown	Previous School
Christian Herluf	1	GK	6'3"	Senior	Odder, Denmark	NC State
George Wyatt	4	DF	6'2"	Graduate Student	Bury, England	DePaul
Alander Soares	7	MF	5'10"	Junior	Caxias do Sul, Brazil	Lindenwood
Luke Adams	14	DF	6'4"	Junior	McKinney, Texas	Tulsa
Guilherme Gomes	16	MF	6'2"	Sophomore	São Paulo, Brazil	St. John's

==== Recruiting class ====
Name	Nat.	Hometown	Club / High school
Lucas McPartlin; GK	USA	Wildwood, Missouri	St. Louis City SC Academy
João Pereira; DF	POR	Lisbon, Portugal	Sporting CP
Henry Sanders; MF	USA	St. Louis, Missouri	SLUH

== Squad ==
=== Roster ===
As of November 6, 2026

Note: Flags indicate national team as defined under FIFA eligibility rules; some limited exceptions apply. Players may hold more than one non-FIFA nationality.

No.	Pos.	Nation	Player
0	GK	USA	Connor Dillman
1	GK	DEN	Christian Herluf
2	DF	USA	Carlos Leatherman
3	DF	FIN	Gershon Henry
4	DF	ENG	George Wyatt
5	DF	USA	JC Cortez
6	DF	POR	João Pereira
7	MF	BRA	Alander Soares
8	MF	ENG	Sam Coughlan
9	MF	USA	Tanner Anderson
10	MF	USA	Jack DiMaria
11	MF	USA	Xavi O'Neil
13	DF	USA	Kai Jaeger
14	DF	USA	Luke Adams
15	DF	USA	Carter Knodle

No.	Pos.	Nation	Player
16	MF	BRA	Guilherme Gomes
17	FW	USA	Andrew Heckenlaible
18	FW	BRA	Theo Franca
19	MF	USA	Drake Fournier
21	DF	USA	Jacksen McNeal
22	FW	USA	Jackson Delkus
23	MF	USA	Nick Schramm
24	MF	USA	Kavi Badh
26	FW	USA	Axel Torres
27	MF	USA	Sam Kalish
29	GK	USA	Kyle Deming
30	GK	USA	Lucas McPartlin
33	MF	USA	Luke Ponciroli
34	MF	USA	Henry Sanders

=== Team management ===
Position	Staff
Head coach	(United States) Kevin Kalish
Assistant coach	Kevin Stoll
Assistant coach	Jack Roberts
Assistant coach (goalkeepers)	Carlos Tofern
Director of operations	Constantin Heider

== Schedule ==
Date Time, TV	Rank^{#}	Opponent^{#}	Result	Record	Site (Attendance) City, State
Regular season
August 20*; 7:00 p.m., ESPN+	No. 4	Seattle	W 4–0	1–0–0	Hermann Stadium (1,122); St. Louis, MO
August 24*; 7:00 p.m., ESPN+	No. 4	No. 15 SMU	L 0–4	1–1–0	Hermann Stadium (1,233); St. Louis, MO
August 28*; 6:30 p.m., ACCNX	No. 8	at Notre Dame	T 1–1	1–1–1	Alumni Stadium (929); South Bend, IN
September 2*; 7:00 p.m., ESPN+		Green Bay	W 2–0	2–1–1	Hermann Stadium (1,017); St. Louis, MO
September 6*; 6:00 p.m.		at SIUE; Bronze Boot	L 0–1	2–2–1	Korte Stadium (1,947); Edwardsville, IL
September 12*; 7:00 p.m., ESPN+		No. 14 Akron	L 1–2	2–3–1	Hermann Stadium (1,533); St. Louis, MO
September 19; 6:00 p.m., ESPN+		at Dayton	T 1–1	2–3–2 (0–0–1)	Baujan Field (487); Dayton, OH
September 26; 6:30 p.m., ESPN+		Duquesne	W 1–0	3–3–2 (1–0–1)	Hermann Stadium (3,246); St. Louis, MO
September 29*; 7:00 p.m., ESPN+		Drake	T 1–1	3–3–3	Hermann Stadium (573); St. Louis, MO
October 3; 7:00 p.m., ESPN+		Saint Joseph's	W 1–0	4–3–3 (2–0–1)	Hermann Stadium (676); St. Louis, MO
October 7; 6:00 p.m., ESPN+		at Fordham	L 1–2	4–4–3 (2–1–1)	Jack Coffey Field (176); Bronx, NY
October 10; 6:00 p.m., ESPN+		at La Salle	W 3–2	5–4–3 (3–1–1)	McCarthy Stadium (246); Philadelphia, PA
October 17; 7:00 p.m., ESPN+		VCU	W 4–1	6–4–3 (4–1–1)	Hermann Stadium (645); St. Louis, MO
October 20*; 7:00 p.m., ESPN+		North Florida	T 1–1	6–4–4	Hermann Stadium (379); St. Louis, MO
October 24; 7:00 p.m., ESPN+		Loyola Chicago	W 4–0	7–4–4 (5–1–1)	Hermann Stadium (921); St. Louis, MO
October 31; 6:00 p.m., ESPN+		at Davidson	T 1–1	7–4–5 (5–1–2)	Alumni Stadium (1,432); Davidson, NC
Atlantic 10 Tournament
November 6*; 1:00 p.m., ESPN+	(2)	(7) Dayton; Quarterfinals	W 1–0	8–4–5	Hermann Stadium (413); St. Louis, MO
November 10*; 4:00 p.m., ESPN+	(2)	(5) Davidson; Semifinals			Hermann Stadium; St. Louis, MO
*Non-conference game. ^{#}Rankings from United Soccer Coaches. (#) Tournament seedings in parentheses. All times are in Central.

== Goals record ==
Through October 31, 2026.

Rank	No.	Nat.	Po.	Name	Regular season	A-10 Tournament	NCAA Tournament	Total
1	9	(United States)	MF	Tanner Anderson	7	0	0	7
2	7	(Brazil)	MF	Alander Soares	3	0	0	3
2	14	(United States)	DF	Luke Adams	3	0	0	3
2	22	(United States)	FW	Jackson Delkus	3	0	0	3
2	26	(United States)	FW	Axel Torres	3	0	0	3
6	17	(United States)	FW	Andrew Heckenlaible	2	0	0	2
6	18	(Brazil)	FW	Theo Franca	2	0	0	2
8	3	(Finland)	DF	Gershon Henry	1	0	0	1
8	16	(Brazil)	MF	Guilherme Gomes	1	0	0	1
Own goals					1	0	0	1
Total					26	0	0	26

== Disciplinary record ==
Through October 31, 2026. Does not include two cautions issued to the Saint Louis bench.

Rank	No.	Nat.	Po.	Name	Regular Season			A-10 Tournament			NCAA Tournament			Total		
Rank	No.	Nat.	Po.	Name	Yellow card	(yellow card) (yellow-red card)	Red card	Yellow card	(yellow card) (yellow-red card)	Red card	Yellow card	(yellow card) (yellow-red card)	Red card	Yellow card	(yellow card) (yellow-red card)	Red card
1	17	(United States)	FW	Andrew Heckenlaible	4	0	0	0	0	0	0	0	0	4	0	0
2	2	(United States)	DF	Carlos Leatherman	1	0	1	0	0	0	0	0	0	1	0	1
2	19	(United States)	MF	Drake Fournier	1	0	1	0	0	0	0	0	0	1	0	1
4	4	(England)	DF	George Wyatt	2	0	0	0	0	0	0	0	0	2	0	0
4	14	(United States)	DF	Luke Adams	2	0	0	0	0	0	0	0	0	2	0	0
4	18	(Brazil)	FW	Theo Franca	2	0	0	0	0	0	0	0	0	2	0	0
4	23	(United States)	MF	Nick Schramm	2	0	0	0	0	0	0	0	0	2	0	0
8	5	(United States)	DF	JC Cortez	1	0	0	0	0	0	0	0	0	1	0	0
8	7	(Brazil)	MF	Alander Soares	1	0	0	0	0	0	0	0	0	1	0	0
8	8	(England)	MF	Sam Coughlan	1	0	0	0	0	0	0	0	0	1	0	0
8	9	(United States)	MF	Tanner Anderson	1	0	0	0	0	0	0	0	0	1	0	0
8	10	(United States)	MF	Jack DiMaria	1	0	0	0	0	0	0	0	0	1	0	0
8	13	(United States)	DF	Kai Jaeger	1	0	0	0	0	0	0	0	0	1	0	0
8	26	(United States)	FW	Axel Torres	1	0	0	0	0	0	0	0	0	1	0	0
8	33	(United States)	MF	Luke Ponciroli	1	0	0	0	0	0	0	0	0	1	0	0
Total					22	0	2	0	0	0	0	0	0	22	0	2

== Awards and honors ==
Recipient	Award	Date	Ref.
Luke Adams	Hermann Trophy Player to Watch List	August 5	
Luke Adams	Preseason All-Atlantic 10 Team	August 17	
JC Cortez	Preseason All-Atlantic 10 Team	August 17	
Theo Franca	Preseason All-Atlantic 10 Team	August 17	
Carlos Leatherman	Preseason All-Atlantic 10 Team	August 17	
Luke Adams	TopDrawerSoccer Preseason Best XI – Third Team	August 18	
Lucas McPartlin	TopDrawerSoccer Preseason Freshman Team	August 18	
Luke Adams	Atlantic 10 Defensive Player of the Week	September 28	
Axel Torres	Atlantic 10 Offensive Player of the Week	October 19	
Lucas McPartlin	Atlantic 10 Rookie of the Week	October 26	

== Rankings ==
Ranking movements Legend: ██ Increase in ranking ██ Decrease in ranking — = Not ranked RV = Received votes
	Week																
Poll	Pre	1	2	3	4	5	6	7	8	9	10	11	12	13	14	15	Final
United Soccer	4	8	—	—	—	—	—	—	—	—	RV	—		Not released			
TopDrawer Soccer	3	3	2	16	—	—	—	—	—	—	—	—	—				
College Soccer News	6	12	17	—	—	—	—	—	—	—	—	—			Not released		
