= 2026 Akron Zips men's soccer team =

American college soccer season

2026 Akron Zips men's soccer

Big East Midwest Division co-champions
- Conference: Big East Conference
- U. Soc. Coaches poll: No. 5
- TopDrawerSoccer.com: No. 4
- Record: 11–1–4 (4–1–3 Big East)
- Head coach: Jared Embick (14th season)
- Assistant coaches: Ger Coppinger; Michael Nanchoff; Attila Schmidt
- Home stadium: FirstEnergy Stadium

2026 Big East Conference men's soccer standings
	Conf.					Overall
Team	W		L		T	W		L		T
East
No. 1 Georgetown †	7	–	0	–	0	14	–	1	–	1
UConn	4	–	3	–	0	8	–	7	–	2
Seton Hall	3	–	2	–	2	6	–	4	–	6
St. John's	2	–	3	–	2	6	–	8	–	2
Providence	0	–	5	–	2	5	–	7	–	3
Villanova	0	–	6	–	1	5	–	8	–	3
Midwest
No. 10 Creighton	3	–	1	–	3	11	–	1	–	5
No. 5 Akron	3	–	1	–	3	10	–	1	–	4
Xavier	2	–	2	–	3	9	–	2	–	4
Marquette	3	–	4	–	0	10	–	5	–	1
Butler	3	–	2	–	2	3	–	8	–	3
DePaul	2	–	3	–	2	5	–	5	–	5
† – Division champion ‡ – 2026 Big East tournament champion + – At-large invitation to the 2026 NCAA tournament; As of November 3, 2026; Rankings from United Soccer Coaches; Source: Big East

The 2026 Akron Zips men's soccer team represents the University of Akron during the 2026 NCAA Division I men's soccer season. It is the program's fourth season in the Big East Conference, which it joined in 2023. The Zips are led by head coach Jared Embick, in his fourteenth season as head coach and his twentieth season overall with the program; Embick joined the staff in 2007 and became head coach after the 2012 season. In March 2026, he signed a contract extension that runs through the 2035 season. The Zips play their home games at FirstEnergy Stadium in Akron, Ohio.

Coming off a run to the NCAA Tournament quarterfinals, Akron began the season ranked twelfth in the United Soccer Coaches preseason poll and eighth by TopDrawerSoccer, and was picked to win the Big East's Midwest Division, receiving 11 first-place votes in the league's preseason coaches' poll. Forward Remi Agunbiade, who was selected by San Diego FC in the second round of the 2026 MLS SuperDraft but returned to Akron while dealing with a nagging injury, and midfielder Matt Dreas were named to the Preseason All-Big East Team. The Zips opened with a 3–0 win over Dayton, Embick's 159th win as Akron's head coach, and went unbeaten through their first seven matches, including a come-from-behind 3–2 win over eighteenth-ranked Cornell and a 2–1 win at Saint Louis in a rematch of the previous season's NCAA quarterfinal. Five different players scored in a 5–2 win over Robert Morris on September 22. A September 3 match at West Virginia was ruled a no contest after a weather delay early in the second half. Akron suffered its first loss on September 25, falling 3–1 at home to fifth-ranked Georgetown. The Zips then went unbeaten over their final eight regular-season matches, a stretch that included an 86th-minute winner by Agunbiade against Syracuse and a 2–1 win over fourteenth-ranked Xavier, which entered the match unbeaten, on Matthew Paiva's goal in the final two minutes. A 5–0 win at Villanova on October 31 was the highest-scoring Big East match in program history.

Akron finished the regular season 11–1–4 and 4–1–3 in Big East play. A 2–0 win at Marquette in the regular season finale gave the Zips a share of the Midwest Division title, their third consecutive shared or outright division crown, and the third seed in the Big East Tournament, where they will face second-seeded Creighton in the semifinals at the Maryland SoccerPlex. Akron rose to fifth in the United Soccer Coaches poll in November, and also moved into the top five of the College Soccer News poll.

== Previous season ==
The Zips finished the 2025 season with a 13–5–3 record. A 1–0 win at Creighton on November 7 gave Akron its second consecutive Big East Midwest Division title and the second seed in the Big East Tournament, where the Zips lost 2–1 to UConn in the semifinals. Akron received the fourteenth national seed in the NCAA Tournament, and defeated Notre Dame 1–0 on Paiva's 88th-minute goal and Duke 2–0 behind two goals from Agunbiade. The Zips' season ended with a 3–2 home loss to Saint Louis in the quarterfinals; Akron led 2–1 when Dreas was sent off, and the Billikens scored twice in the final 13 minutes. Goalkeeper Mitch Budler, the Big East Goalkeeper of the Year in 2024 and 2025, led the nation with 13 shutouts and was named to TopDrawerSoccer's Best XI Third Team. Stefan Dobrijevic and Agunbiade were selected in the second round of the 2026 MLS SuperDraft by Austin FC and San Diego FC, respectively.

== Player movement ==
=== Players leaving ===
Departures
Name	Number	Pos.	Height	Year	Hometown	Reason for Departure
Lincoln McCarty	0	GK	6'4"	Redshirt Freshman	Cave Creek, Arizona	—
Mitch Budler	1	GK	6'4"	Redshirt Senior	Lincoln, Nebraska	Graduated
Daragh Reilly	3	DF	6'0"	Senior	Meath, Ireland	Graduated
Malte Schmaus	5	MF	5'9"	Freshman	Hammersbach, Germany	—
Connor Filsinger	7	MF	5'11"	Sophomore	Frankfurt, Germany	—
Aljaz Dodig	8	FW	6'0"	Freshman	Ljubljana, Slovenia	—
Nathan Ferguson	9	FW	6'4"	Redshirt Sophomore	Glen Carbon, Illinois	Transferred to Belmont
Caleb Borneo	10	MF	5'6"	Redshirt Sophomore	Morgantown, West Virginia	Transferred to UNC Greensboro
Abdi Bahur	12	FW	6'1"	Sophomore	Toronto, Ontario	—
Joshua Bartels	15	MF	5'9"	Sophomore	Stafford, Virginia	—
Stefan Dobrijevic	18	FW	6'2"	Senior	Uniontown, Ohio	Graduated; drafted by Austin FC
Jamai Royer	25	DF	6'1"	Freshman	Markham, Ontario	—
Jose Pedro	26	DF	6'2"	Freshman	Porto, Portugal	Transferred to Xavier
Ashton Kamdem	27	DF	5'10"	Senior	West Chester, Ohio	Graduated
Logan LaMaina	28	DF	6'0"	Freshman	Sellersville, Pennsylvania	—

=== Players arriving ===
==== Incoming transfers ====
Incoming transfers
Name	Number	Pos.	Height	Year	Hometown	Previous School
Nolan McGuire	2	DF	5'9"	Junior	St. Louis, Missouri	DePaul
Aiden Benitez	14	FW	5'9"	Sophomore	Westfield, Indiana	Butler
Francisco Tolaba	20	MF	5'9"	Senior	Buenos Aires, Argentina	St. Thomas (Fla.) / Long Island
Francesco Tricarico	30	GK	6'1"	Senior	Cerignola, Italy	Iowa Western CC / Biola

==== Recruiting class ====
Name	Nat.	Hometown	High school / Club
Austin Thum; MF	USA	El Dorado Hills, California	Oak Ridge
Benji Jonas Atiabou; DF	AUT	Salzburg, Austria	—
Calan DeWalt; DF	USA	Dublin, Ohio	Jerome
Cole Perez; DF	USA	Orange Park, Florida	Oakleaf
Ioannis Gazis; DF	GRE	Attica, Greece	Panathinaikos FC
Ivory Covington; FW	USA	Lilburn, Georgia	Atlanta United Academy
Kael Taylor; GK	USA	Olathe, Kansas	Olathe West
Kam Warnke; DF	USA	Aurora, Ohio	Aurora
Leo Morana; MF	USA	Strongsville, Ohio	Strongsville
Londen Sears; MF	USA	New Albany, Ohio	New Albany
Noa Testa; MF	SUI	La Sarraz, Switzerland	Lausanne Sport
Sam Bunch; DF	BEL	Brussels, Belgium	KA Redingenhof Leuven

== Squad ==
=== Roster ===
As of November 6, 2026

Note: Flags indicate national team as defined under FIFA eligibility rules; some limited exceptions apply. Players may hold more than one non-FIFA nationality.

No.	Pos.	Nation	Player
0	GK	USA	Gavin Crane
1	GK	USA	Brett Kaminski
2	DF	USA	Nolan McGuire
3	DF	USA	Kam Warnke
4	DF	USA	Freddy Kossehasse
5	DF	GRE	Ioannis Gazis
6	DF	CAN	Matthew Paiva
7	MF	USA	Thomas O’Rourke
8	MF	USA	Tyler Morck
9	FW	CAN	Farrel Ngongang
10	MF	USA	Jack Roman
11	MF	USA	Leo Morana
12	DF	USA	Cole Perez
13	FW	CAN	Remi Agunbiade
14	FW	USA	Aiden Benitez

No.	Pos.	Nation	Player
15	MF	USA	Austin Thum
16	DF	USA	Calan DeWalt
17	FW	USA	Ignacio Alem
18	DF	AUT	Benji Jonas Atiabou
19	MF	USA	Jack Sullivan
20	MF	ARG	Francisco Tolaba
21	DF	BEL	Sam Bunch
22	MF	USA	Matt Dreas
23	MF	USA	Braxton Hayes
24	MF	SUI	Noa Testa
26	MF	USA	Londen Sears
27	FW	USA	Ivory Covington
29	GK	USA	Kael Taylor
30	GK	ITA	Francesco Tricarico

=== Team management ===
Position	Staff
Head coach	Jared Embick
Associate head coach	Ger Coppinger
Assistant coach	Michael Nanchoff
Assistant coach	Attila Schmidt
General manager	William Zufall

== Schedule ==
Date Time, TV	Rank^{#}	Opponent^{#}	Result	Record	Site (Attendance) City, State
Regular season
August 20*; 7:00 p.m., ESPN+	No. 12	Dayton	W 3–0	1–0–0	FirstEnergy Stadium (1,422); Akron, OH
August 24*; 7:00 p.m., ESPN+	No. 12	Army	T 0–0	1–0–1	FirstEnergy Stadium (1,686); Akron, OH
August 28*; 7:00 p.m., ESPN+	No. 10	Wake Forest	W 1–0	2–0–1	FirstEnergy Stadium (2,260); Akron, OH
September 3*; 7:00 p.m., ESPN+	No. 9	at West Virginia	No contest	2–0–1	Morgantown, WV
September 8*; 7:00 p.m., ESPN+	No. 14	No. 18 Cornell	W 3–2	3–0–1	FirstEnergy Stadium (1,490); Akron, OH
September 12*; 8:00 p.m., ESPN+	No. 14	at Saint Louis	W 2–1	4–0–1	Robert R. Hermann Stadium (1,533); St. Louis, MO
September 18; 7:00 p.m., ESPN+	No. 6	Butler	T 0–0	4–0–2 (0–0–1)	FirstEnergy Stadium (1,035); Akron, OH
September 22*; 7:00 p.m., ESPN+	No. 17	Robert Morris	W 5–2	5–0–2	FirstEnergy Stadium (567); Akron, OH
September 25; 7:00 p.m., ESPN+	No. 17	No. 5 Georgetown	L 1–3	5–1–2 (0–1–1)	FirstEnergy Stadium (1,860); Akron, OH
October 2; 4:00 p.m., ESPN+	No. 18	at DePaul	W 2–0	6–1–2 (1–1–1)	Wish Field at Cacciatore Stadium (298); Chicago, IL
October 6*; 7:00 p.m., ESPN+	No. 12	No. 25 Syracuse	W 2–1	7–1–2	FirstEnergy Stadium (874); Akron, OH
October 11; 6:00 p.m., ESPN+	No. 12	No. 6 Creighton; Senior Night	T 1–1	7–1–3 (1–1–2)	FirstEnergy Stadium (1,069); Akron, OH
October 16; 7:00 p.m., ESPN+	No. 9	at Providence	T 1–1	7–1–4 (1–1–3)	Chapey Field at Anderson Stadium (1,184); Providence, RI
October 20*; 7:00 p.m., ESPN+	No. 9	at Cleveland State	W 3–2	8–1–4	Krenzler Field (450); Cleveland, OH
October 24; 6:00 p.m., ESPN+	No. 9	No. 14 Xavier	W 2–1	9–1–4 (2–1–3)	FirstEnergy Stadium (911); Akron, OH
October 31; 1:00 p.m., ESPN+	No. 6	at Villanova	W 5–0	10–1–4 (3–1–3)	Higgins Soccer Complex (97); Villanova, PA
November 6; 7:00 p.m., ESPN+	No. 5	at Marquette	W 2–0	11–1–4 (4–1–3)	Valley Fields (209); Milwaukee, WI
Big East Tournament
November 12*; 5:00 p.m., ESPN+	(3)	vs. (2) Creighton; Semifinals			Maryland SoccerPlex; Boyds, MD
*Non-conference game. ^{#}Rankings from United Soccer Coaches. (#) Tournament seedings in parentheses. All times are in Eastern.

== Goals record ==
Through November 6, 2026.

Rank	No.	Nat.	Po.	Name	Regular season	Big East Tournament	NCAA Tournament	Total
1	9	(Canada)	FW	Farrel Ngongang	5	0	0	5
1	13	(Canada)	FW	Remi Agunbiade	5	0	0	5
3	6	(Canada)	DF	Matthew Paiva	4	0	0	4
3	7	(United States)	MF	Thomas O'Rourke	4	0	0	4
5	10	(United States)	MF	Jack Roman	2	0	0	2
5	19	(United States)	MF	Jack Sullivan	2	0	0	2
5	22	(United States)	MF	Matt Dreas	2	0	0	2
5	24	(Switzerland)	MF	Noa Testa	2	0	0	2
9	8	(United States)	MF	Tyler Morck	1	0	0	1
9	11	(United States)	MF	Leo Morana	1	0	0	1
9	12	(United States)	DF	Cole Perez	1	0	0	1
9	14	(United States)	FW	Aiden Benitez	1	0	0	1
9	21	(Belgium)	DF	Sam Bunch	1	0	0	1
9	23	(United States)	MF	Braxton Hayes	1	0	0	1
9	26	(United States)	MF	Londen Sears	1	0	0	1
Total					33	0	0	33

== Disciplinary record ==
Through November 6, 2026. Team totals include three additional cautions issued to the Akron team.

Rank	No.	Nat.	Po.	Name	Regular Season			Big East Tournament			NCAA Tournament			Total		
Rank	No.	Nat.	Po.	Name	Yellow card	(yellow card) (yellow-red card)	Red card	Yellow card	(yellow card) (yellow-red card)	Red card	Yellow card	(yellow card) (yellow-red card)	Red card	Yellow card	(yellow card) (yellow-red card)	Red card
1	13	(Canada)	FW	Remi Agunbiade	2	0	1	0	0	0	0	0	0	2	0	1
2	4	(United States)	DF	Freddy Kossehasse	3	0	0	0	0	0	0	0	0	3	0	0
2	6	(Canada)	DF	Matthew Paiva	3	0	0	0	0	0	0	0	0	3	0	0
2	9	(Canada)	FW	Farrel Ngongang	3	0	0	0	0	0	0	0	0	3	0	0
2	20	(Argentina)	MF	Francisco Tolaba	3	0	0	0	0	0	0	0	0	3	0	0
2	21	(Belgium)	DF	Sam Bunch	3	0	0	0	0	0	0	0	0	3	0	0
7	7	(United States)	MF	Thomas O'Rourke	2	0	0	0	0	0	0	0	0	2	0	0
8	1	(United States)	GK	Brett Kaminski	1	0	0	0	0	0	0	0	0	1	0	0
8	2	(United States)	DF	Nolan McGuire	1	0	0	0	0	0	0	0	0	1	0	0
8	8	(United States)	MF	Tyler Morck	1	0	0	0	0	0	0	0	0	1	0	0
8	10	(United States)	MF	Jack Roman	1	0	0	0	0	0	0	0	0	1	0	0
8	12	(United States)	DF	Cole Perez	1	0	0	0	0	0	0	0	0	1	0	0
8	17	(United States)	FW	Ignacio Alem	1	0	0	0	0	0	0	0	0	1	0	0
8	19	(United States)	MF	Jack Sullivan	1	0	0	0	0	0	0	0	0	1	0	0
8	23	(United States)	MF	Braxton Hayes	1	0	0	0	0	0	0	0	0	1	0	0
Total					27	0	1	0	0	0	0	0	0	27	0	1

== Awards and honors ==
Recipient	Award	Date	Ref.
Matt Dreas	MAC Hermann Trophy Preseason Watch List	August 7	
Remi Agunbiade	Preseason All-Big East Team	August 11	
Matt Dreas	Preseason All-Big East Team	August 11	
Brett Kaminski	Big East Goalkeeper of the Week	September 14	
Thomas O'Rourke	Big East Weekly Honor Roll	September 14	
Thomas O'Rourke	TopDrawerSoccer National Team of the Week	September 16	
Remi Agunbiade	Big East Offensive Player of the Week	October 5	
Matthew Paiva	Big East Defensive Player of the Week	October 12	
Brett Kaminski	Big East Weekly Honor Roll	October 12	
Farrel Ngongang	Big East Weekly Honor Roll	October 26	
Matthew Paiva	Big East Defensive Player of the Week	November 2	
Brett Kaminski	Big East Goalkeeper of the Week	November 2	
Farrel Ngongang	Big East Weekly Honor Roll	November 2	

== Rankings ==
Ranking movements Legend: ██ Increase in ranking ██ Decrease in ranking
	Week																
Poll	Pre	1	2	3	4	5	6	7	8	9	10	11	12	13	14	15	Final
United Soccer	12	10	9	14	6	17	18	12	9	9	6	5		Not released			
TopDrawer Soccer	8	8	6	11	7	2	17	18	9	6	11	4	4				
College Soccer News	12	16	11	9	9	8	10	10	10	11	9	5			Not released		
