= 2026 Furman Paladins men's soccer team =

American college soccer season

2026 Furman Paladins men's soccer

SoCon regular season co-champions
- Conference: Southern Conference
- Record: 7–3–6 (3–1–2 SoCon)
- Head coach: Brandon Tucker (1st season)
- Assistant coaches: Bret Boulware; Camilo Rodriguez; Charlie Arndt
- Home stadium: Stone Stadium

2026 Southern Conference men's soccer standings
	Conf.					Overall
Team	W		L		T	W		L		T
Furman †	3	–	1	–	2	7	–	3	–	6
Wofford †	3	–	1	–	2	8	–	4	–	4
UNC Greensboro	2	–	0	–	4	5	–	2	–	9
East Tennessee State	2	–	0	–	4	7	–	6	–	5
Liberty	3	–	3	–	0	6	–	7	–	2
VMI	1	–	5	–	0	6	–	12	–	1
Mercer	0	–	4	–	2	0	–	13	–	5
† – Conference champion ‡– 2026 SoCon tournament champion + – At-large invitation to the 2026 NCAA tournament; As of November 3, 2026; Rankings from United Soccer Coaches; Source: SoCon

The 2026 Furman Paladins men's soccer team represents Furman University during the 2026 NCAA Division I men's soccer season. The Paladins are led by head coach Brandon Tucker, in his first season as head coach and his tenth season overall with the program. Tucker, who spent the previous nine seasons as an assistant and associate head coach at Furman, was promoted in December 2025 to replace Doug Allison, who retired after 31 seasons in charge. The Paladins play their home games at Stone Stadium in Greenville, South Carolina, and compete in the Southern Conference (SoCon).

Coming off the program's first appearance in the College Cup, Furman began the season ranked third in the United Soccer Coaches preseason poll and second in the TopDrawerSoccer preseason poll, and was picked to win the SoCon in the league's preseason coaches' poll. Diego Hernandez was ranked as the top player in the country in TopDrawerSoccer's preseason Top 100. The Paladins opened the season with a 5–1 loss at Clemson after a second-half surge by the Tigers, and dropped out of the rankings. Tucker earned his first win as head coach on August 27, a 4–3 comeback victory at nineteenth-ranked Duke; defender Luke Munson suffered a traumatic leg injury in the match and later required additional surgery. A 1–0 loss at Liberty on September 26 ended a seven-match unbeaten run. In October, Wilfer Bustamante scored hat-tricks in consecutive matches against Virginia Tech and USC Upstate, becoming the third player in school history to do so and the first since 1996.

The Paladins finished the regular season 7–3–6 and 3–1–2 in SoCon play. A 4–1 win over in-state rival Wofford in the regular season finale gave Furman a share of its 23rd SoCon regular season title, with Wofford, and the first seed in the SoCon Tournament by virtue of the head-to-head result. Furman received a first-round bye and will host Liberty in the semifinals. Bustamante, whose eleven goals led the conference, was named SoCon Player of the Year, and seven Paladins earned All-SoCon honors.

== Previous season ==
The Paladins finished the 2025 season 16–2–5 in Allison's final season as head coach. They went unbeaten in SoCon play to win the regular season title and defeated UNC Greensboro in the final of the SoCon Tournament. Furman received the sixteenth national seed and a first-round bye in the NCAA Tournament, then defeated Western Michigan, Hofstra on penalty kicks, and Portland to reach the College Cup for the first time in program history. The Paladins lost 3–1 to Washington in the national semifinals on December 12, ending Allison's 31-year career with a record of 365–175–77. The program honored Allison and unveiled its College Cup banner before its 2026 home opener.

== Player movement ==
=== Players leaving ===
Departures
Name	Number	Pos.	Height	Weight	Year	Hometown	Reason for Departure
Reece Fragle	2	DF	5'10"	175	Redshirt Senior	McKinney, Texas	Graduated
Lloyd Wamu Snell	9	FW	5'10"	177	Senior	Basingstoke, England	Graduated
Miguel Sosa	14	MF	5'9"	160	Sophomore	Miami, Florida	Transferred to George Washington
Jackson Price	21	FW	6'0"	165	Senior	Columbia, South Carolina	Graduated
Beck Dean	26	MF	6'3"	190	Junior	Charleston, South Carolina	—

=== Players arriving ===
==== Recruiting class ====
Name	Nat.	Hometown	Club
Nate Blahnik; MF	USA	Milton, Georgia	Concorde Fire
Conner Cockayne; DF	USA	Batavia, Ohio	Phoenix Rising
Jonas Heiler; MF	USA	Kennesaw, Georgia	Concorde Fire
Tanner Hollenbeck; DF	USA	Lenexa, Kansas	Kansas Rush
Mason Peacock; FW	USA	Atlanta, Georgia	Atlanta United
David Villavicencio; DF	USA	Stratford, Connecticut	Hartford Athletic

== Squad ==
=== Roster ===
As of November 6, 2026

Note: Flags indicate national team as defined under FIFA eligibility rules; some limited exceptions apply. Players may hold more than one non-FIFA nationality.

No.	Pos.	Nation	Player
0	GK	USA	Max Miller
1	GK	USA	Aaron Salinas
3	DF	USA	David Villavicencio
4	DF	USA	Connor Dunnigan
5	DF	USA	Ryan Wagner
6	MF	USA	Luke Hutzell
7	MF	ENG	Ben Boxall
8	MF	USA	Wesley Siegel
9	FW	USA	Wilfer Bustamante
10	MF	USA	Diego Hernandez
11	MF	USA	Caleb Johnson
13	MF	USA	Wesley Goodwin
15	DF	USA	Jack Travis
16	MF	USA	Grayson Travis
17	MF	USA	Trip Campbell

No.	Pos.	Nation	Player
18	MF	USA	Jonas Heiler
19	MF	USA	Landon Hill
20	FW	USA	Ryan Reid
21	MF	USA	Nate Blahnik
22	DF	USA	Gianluca Rizzo
23	FW	USA	Mason Peacock
24	DF	USA	Connor Stout
25	DF	USA	Braden Dunham
26	DF	USA	Conner Cockayne
27	DF	USA	Luke Munson
28	DF	USA	Tanner Hollenbeck
29	MF	USA	Malachi Grant
30	GK	SVK	Ivan Horvat
31	GK	USA	Andrew Laplaca
33	MF	USA	Gabe Cox

=== Team management ===
Position	Staff
Vice President of Intercollegiate Athletics	Jason Donnelly
Head coach	Brandon Tucker
Associate head coach	Bret Boulware
Associate head coach	Camilo Rodriguez
Volunteer assistant coach	Charlie Arndt
Volunteer assistant coach / Director of Operations	Dawson Martin

== Schedule ==
Date Time, TV	Rank^{#}	Opponent^{#}	Result	Record	Site (Attendance) City, State
Regular season
August 20*; 8:00 p.m., ACCN	No. 3	at Clemson	L 1–5	0–1–0	Riggs Field (4,323); Clemson, SC
August 24*; 6:00 p.m., ESPN+		UNC Asheville	T 1–1	0–1–1	Stone Stadium (1,511); Greenville, SC
August 27*; 7:00 p.m., ACCNX		at No. 19 Duke	W 4–3	1–1–1	Koskinen Stadium (507); Durham, NC
August 30*; 4:00 p.m., FloSports		at UNC Wilmington	T 0–0	1–1–2	UNCW Soccer Stadium (1,006); Wilmington, NC
September 4*; 6:00 p.m., ESPN+		at Davidson	T 2–2	1–1–3	Alumni Soccer Stadium (1,147); Davidson, NC
September 9*; 6:00 p.m.		Gardner–Webb	W 1–0	2–1–3	Stone Stadium (311); Greenville, SC
September 12*; 6:00 p.m., ESPN+		Memphis; Senior Night	T 2–2	2–1–4	Stone Stadium (370); Greenville, SC
September 19; 2:00 p.m., ESPN+		Mercer	W 1–0	3–1–4 (1–0–0)	Stone Stadium (321); Greenville, SC
September 26; 5:00 p.m., ESPN+		at Liberty	L 0–1	3–2–4 (1–1–0)	Osborne Stadium (707); Lynchburg, VA
October 6*; 6:00 p.m., FloSports		at College of Charleston	L 1–2	3–3–4	Ralph Lundy Field (324); Mount Pleasant, SC
October 10; 12:00 p.m., ESPN+		VMI; Quinn Game	W 6–1	4–3–4 (2–1–0)	Stone Stadium (136); Greenville, SC
October 16*; 6:00 p.m., ESPN+		Virginia Tech	W 3–2	5–3–4	Stone Stadium (402); Greenville, SC
October 20*; 6:00 p.m.		USC Upstate; Gray Griffin Memorial Match	W 7–1	6–3–4	Stone Stadium (757); Greenville, SC
October 24; 6:00 p.m.		at East Tennessee State	T 0–0	6–3–5 (2–1–1)	Summers-Taylor Stadium (145); Johnson City, TN
October 27; 6:00 p.m., ESPN+		at UNC Greensboro	T 1–1	6–3–6 (2–1–2)	UNCG Soccer Stadium (326); Greensboro, NC
October 31; 7:00 p.m., ESPN+		Wofford	W 4–1	7–3–6 (3–1–2)	Stone Stadium (423); Greenville, SC
SoCon Tournament
November 8*; 7:00 p.m., ESPN+	(1)	Liberty; Semifinals			Stone Stadium; Greenville, SC
*Non-conference game. ^{#}Rankings from United Soccer Coaches. (#) Tournament seedings in parentheses. All times are in Eastern.

== Goals record ==
Through November 6, 2026.

Rank	No.	Nat.	Po.	Name	Regular season	SoCon Tournament	NCAA Tournament	Total
1	9	(United States)	FW	Wilfer Bustamante	11	0	0	11
2	10	(United States)	MF	Diego Hernandez	5	0	0	5
3	16	(United States)	MF	Grayson Travis	4	0	0	4
4	25	(United States)	DF	Braden Dunham	3	0	0	3
5	11	(United States)	MF	Caleb Johnson	2	0	0	2
5	15	(United States)	DF	Jack Travis	2	0	0	2
5	17	(United States)	MF	Trip Campbell	2	0	0	2
5	19	(United States)	MF	Landon Hill	2	0	0	2
9	5	(United States)	DF	Ryan Wagner	1	0	0	1
9	7	(England)	MF	Ben Boxall	1	0	0	1
9	20	(United States)	FW	Ryan Reid	1	0	0	1
Total					34	0	0	34

== Disciplinary record ==
Through November 6, 2026. Team totals include two additional cautions not credited to individual players.

Rank	No.	Nat.	Po.	Name	Regular Season			SoCon Tournament			NCAA Tournament			Total		
Rank	No.	Nat.	Po.	Name	Yellow card	(yellow card) (yellow-red card)	Red card	Yellow card	(yellow card) (yellow-red card)	Red card	Yellow card	(yellow card) (yellow-red card)	Red card	Yellow card	(yellow card) (yellow-red card)	Red card
1	6	(United States)	MF	Luke Hutzell	3	0	0	0	0	0	0	0	0	3	0	0
1	15	(United States)	DF	Jack Travis	3	0	0	0	0	0	0	0	0	3	0	0
3	8	(United States)	MF	Wesley Siegel	2	0	0	0	0	0	0	0	0	2	0	0
3	10	(United States)	MF	Diego Hernandez	2	0	0	0	0	0	0	0	0	2	0	0
3	22	(United States)	DF	Gianluca Rizzo	2	0	0	0	0	0	0	0	0	2	0	0
3	24	(United States)	DF	Connor Stout	2	0	0	0	0	0	0	0	0	2	0	0
7	5	(United States)	DF	Ryan Wagner	1	0	0	0	0	0	0	0	0	1	0	0
7	9	(United States)	FW	Wilfer Bustamante	1	0	0	0	0	0	0	0	0	1	0	0
7	16	(United States)	MF	Grayson Travis	1	0	0	0	0	0	0	0	0	1	0	0
7	23	(United States)	FW	Mason Peacock	1	0	0	0	0	0	0	0	0	1	0	0
7	33	(United States)	MF	Gabe Cox	1	0	0	0	0	0	0	0	0	1	0	0
Total					19	0	0	0	0	0	0	0	0	19	0	0

== Awards and honors ==
Recipient	Award	Date	Ref.
Wilfer Bustamante	Preseason All-SoCon Team	August 17	
Diego Hernandez	Preseason All-SoCon Team	August 17	
Luke Hutzell	Preseason All-SoCon Team	August 17	
Braden Dunham	Preseason All-SoCon Team	August 17	
Ryan Wagner	Preseason All-SoCon Team	August 17	
Ivan Horvat	Preseason All-SoCon Team	August 17	
Diego Hernandez	TopDrawerSoccer Preseason Best XI First Team	August 18	
Braden Dunham	TopDrawerSoccer Preseason Best XI First Team	August 18	
Diego Hernandez	MAC Hermann Trophy Preseason Watch List	August 19	
Braden Dunham	MAC Hermann Trophy Preseason Watch List	August 19	
Ryan Wagner	SoCon Defensive Player of the Week	September 1	
Aaron Salinas	SoCon Defensive Player of the Week	September 22	
Diego Hernandez	MAC Hermann Trophy Midseason Watch List	October 2	
Braden Dunham	MAC Hermann Trophy Midseason Watch List	October 2	
Wilfer Bustamante	SoCon Offensive Player of the Week; TopDrawerSoccer National Team of the Week	October 20	
Wilfer Bustamante	TopDrawerSoccer National Team of the Week	October 27	
Wilfer Bustamante	SoCon Offensive Player of the Week	November 3	
Wilfer Bustamante	SoCon Player of the Year; All-SoCon First Team	November 4	
Luke Hutzell	All-SoCon First Team	November 4	
Diego Hernandez	All-SoCon First Team	November 4	
Braden Dunham	All-SoCon First Team	November 4	
Ryan Wagner	All-SoCon Second Team	November 4	
Connor Stout	All-SoCon Second Team	November 4	
Aaron Salinas	All-SoCon Second Team	November 4	

== Rankings ==
Ranking movements Legend: ██ Increase in ranking ██ Decrease in ranking — = Not ranked RV = Received votes
	Week																
Poll	Pre	1	2	3	4	5	6	7	8	9	10	11	12	13	14	15	Final
United Soccer	3	—	—	—	—	—	—	—	—	—	—	—		Not released			
TopDrawer Soccer	2	10	21	—	—	—	—	—	—	—	—	—					
College Soccer News	7	RV	RV	—	RV	—	—	—	—	—	—	—			Not released		
