= 2026 Mountain West Conference men's soccer season =

1st season of Mountain West Conference men's soccer in 2026

- League: NCAA Division I
- Sport: Men's soccer
- Duration: August 20 – November 14, 2026
- Teams: 6
- TV partner(s): CBS Sports (CBSSN, Paramount+); Fox Sports (FS1, FS2)

2027 MLS SuperDraft

Regular season

Tournament

Seasons
- 2027–28

2026 Mountain West Conference men's soccer standings
	Conf.					Overall
Team	W		L		T	W		L		T
Grand Canyon †	7	–	0	–	2	10	–	5	–	2
UNLV	5	–	3	–	1	9	–	5	–	3
San Jose State	3	–	4	–	2	6	–	8	–	3
Air Force	3	–	4	–	2	4	–	7	–	5
UC Davis	2	–	5	–	2	2	–	10	–	5
Utah Tech	2	–	6	–	1	3	–	12	–	2
† – Conference champion ‡ – 2026 MW tournament champion + – At-large invitation to the 2026 NCAA tournament; As of November 1, 2026; Rankings from United Soccer Coaches; Source: MW

The 2026 Mountain West Conference men's soccer season will be the inaugural season of college soccer play for the Mountain West Conference. It will be part of the 2026 NCAA Division I men's soccer season. Six teams will compete in the conference during the season. The season will begin on August 20, 2026, and conclude with the championship game of the Mountain West Conference men's soccer tournament on November 14, 2026. The full season schedule was released on June 4, 2026.

== Teams ==
=== Stadiums and locations ===
Team	Location	Stadium	Capacity
Air Force	Colorado Springs, Colorado	Cadet Soccer Stadium	1,000
Grand Canyon	Phoenix, Arizona	GCU Stadium	6,000
San José State	San Jose, California	Spartan Soccer Complex	1,560
UC Davis	Davis, California	Aggie Soccer Field	1,000
UNLV	Las Vegas, Nevada	Peter Johann Memorial Field	2,000
Utah Tech	St. George, Utah	Greater Zion Stadium	10,500

=== Coaches ===
Note: All stats current through the completion of the 2025 season

Team	Head coach	Years at school	Overall record	Record at school
Air Force	Greg Dalby	2	0–0–0 (–)	1–13–3 (.147)
Grand Canyon	Jamie Davies	1	19–13–6 (.579)	0–0–0 (–)
San José State	Simon Tobin	13	394–281–89 (.574)	87–90–37 (.493)
UC Davis	Dwayne Shaffer	30	269–222–82 (.541)	262–212–81 (.545)
UNLV	B. J. Craig	5	48–60–35 (.458)	17–29–22 (.412)
Utah Tech	Jonny Broadhead	10	61–84–20 (.430)	61–84–20 (.430)

== Preseason ==
=== Recruiting classes ===
Rankings
Team	TopDrawer Soccer	Prep Soccer	Signees
Air Force			
Grand Canyon			
San José State			
UC Davis			
UNLV			
Utah Tech			

Note: College Soccer News did not release a recruiting rankings for the 2026 season.

=== Preseason poll ===
Mountain West preseason poll
Predicted finish	Team
1	Grand Canyon
2	San Jose State
3	UC Davis
4	UNLV
5	Air Force
6	Utah Tech

=== Preseason national polls ===
	United; Soccer	CSN	Top Drawer; Soccer
Air Force			
Grand Canyon	21		
San José State			
UC Davis			
UNLV			
Utah Tech			

== Regular season ==
=== Conference results ===
Each team plays every other conference team twice; once home and once away.

Home \ Away	AFA	GCU	SJSU	UCD	UNLV	UT
Air Force	—	Nov. 6	Oct. 24	Oct. 18	Oct. 4	Sep. 26
Grand Canyon	Oct. 14	—	Oct. 4	Nov. 1	Sep. 26	Oct. 18
San José State	Oct. 9	Oct. 28	—	Sep. 26	Oct. 18	Nov. 1
UC Davis	Sep. 30	Oct. 10	Nov. 6	—	Oct. 28	Oct. 23
UNLV	Nov. 1	Oct. 23	Sep. 30	Oct. 14	—	Oct. 10
Utah Tech	Oct. 28	Sep. 30	Oct. 14	Oct. 4	Nov. 6	—

First match(es) will be played: September 26, 2026. Source: Mountain West
Legend: Blue = home team win; Yellow = draw; Red = away team win.
For upcoming matches, an "a" indicates there is an article about the rivalry between the two participants.

== Rankings ==
=== National rankings ===
Legend
Increase in ranking
Decrease in ranking
Not ranked previous week

		Pre	Wk 1	Wk 2	Wk 3	Wk 4	Wk 5	Wk 6	Wk 7	Wk 8	Wk 9	Wk 10	Wk 11	Wk 12	Wk 13	Wk 14	Wk 15	Final
Air Force	USC	—	—	—	—	—	—	—	—	—	—	—	—	—	Not released			
Air Force	TDS	—	—	—	—	—	—	—	—	—	—	—	—	—				
Air Force	CSN	—	—	—	—	—	—	—	—	—	—	—	—		Not released			
Grand Canyon	USC	21	—	—	—	—	—	—	—	—	—	—	—	—	Not released			
Grand Canyon	TDS	—	—	—	—	—	—	—	—	—	—	—	—	—				
Grand Canyon	CSN	RV	RV	—	—	—	—	—	—	—	—	—	—		Not released			
San José State	USC	—	—	—	—	—	—	—	—	—	—	—	—	—	Not released			
San José State	TDS	—	—	—	—	—	—	—	—	—	—	—	—	—				
San José State	CSN	—	—	—	—	—	—	—	—	—	—	—	—		Not released			
UC Davis	USC	—	—	—	—	—	—	—	—	—	—	—	—	—	Not released			
UC Davis	TDS	—	—	—	—	—	—	—	—	—	—	—	—	—				
UC Davis	CSN	—	—	—	—	—	—	—	—	—	—	—	—		Not released			
UNLV	USC	—	—	—	—	—	—	—	—	—	—	—	—	—	Not released			
UNLV	TDS	—	—	—	—	—	—	—	—	—	—	—	—	—				
UNLV	CSN	—	—	—	—	—	—	—	—	—	—	—	—		Not released			
Utah Tech	USC	—	—	—	—	—	—	—	—	—	—	—	—	—	Not released			
Utah Tech	TDS	—	—	—	—	—	—	—	—	—	—	—	—	—				
Utah Tech	CSN	—	—	—	—	—	—	—	—	—	—	—	—		Not released			

=== Regional rankings - Far West Region ===
Legend
Increase in ranking
Decrease in ranking
Not ranked previous week

	Wk 1	Wk 2	Wk 3	Wk 4	Wk 5	Wk 6	Wk 7	Wk 8	Wk 9	Wk 10	Wk 11	Wk 12
Air Force	—	—	—	—	—	—	—	—	—	—	—	—
Grand Canyon	5	—	—	—	—	—	7	7	6	4	5	6
San José State	—	—	—	—	—	—	—	—	—	—	—	—
UC Davis	—	—	—	—	—	—	—	—	—	—	—	—
UNLV	7	6	7	3	7	10	5	5	8	8	7	8
Utah Tech	—	—	—	—	—	—	—	—	—	—	—	—

== Postseason ==
=== MW Tournament ===
Semifinals; November 11
2
3
1
4

Championship; November 14

==== All-Tournament team ====
Player	Team

=== NCAA Tournament ===
Seed	Region	School	1st round	2nd round	3rd round	Quarterfinals	Semifinals	Championship
		TBD						
W–L–D (%):			0–0–0 (–)	0–0–0 (–)	0–0–0 (–)	0–0–0 (–)	0–0–0 (–)	0–0–0 (–) Total: 0–0–0 (–)

== Player statistics ==
As of August 7, 2026

=== Goals ===
Rank	Player	College	Goals

=== Assists ===
Rank	Player	College	Assists

=== Points ===
Two points for a goal, one point for an assist.

Rank	Player	College	Points

== Awards and honors ==
=== Player of the week honors ===
Following each week's games, Mountain West conference officials select the players of the week.

Week	Offensive		Defensive		Freshman	
Week	Player	Team	Player	Team	Player	Team
Week 1 (Aug. 24)	Maxim Scordo	UNLV	Hunter Anderson	Air Force	Hunter Anderson	Air Force
Week 2 (Aug. 31)	Amir Anwary	San Jose State	Hugo Lemos	UNLV	None	
Week 3 (Sep. 7)	Arnau Camaño	Grand Canyon	Matas Jokubaitis	Grand Canyon	Arnau Camaño	Grand Canyon
Week 4 (Sep. 14)	Maxim Scordo (2)	UNLV	Hugo Lemos (2)	UNLV	Arnau Camaño (2)	Grand Canyon
Week 4 (Sep. 21)	Felix Oberwaditzer	Grand Canyon	Ronin Axelson	San Jose State	Felix Oberwaditzer	Grand Canyon
Week 5 (Sep. 28)	Jorge Lopez	Grand Canyon	Felix Oberwaditzer	Grand Canyon	Felix Oberwaditzer (2)	Grand Canyon
Week 6 (Oct. 5)	Maxim Scordo (3)	UNLV	Manolo Vazquez	UNLV	Arnau Camaño (3)	Grand Canyon
Week 7 (Oct. 12)	Jordi Tortell Daly	San Jose State	Manolo Vazquez (2)	UNLV	Isac Enriquez	San Jose State
Week 8 (Oct. 19)	Jorge Lopez (2)	Grand Canyon	Beltran Fernandez	Grand Canyon	Isac Enriquez (2)	San Jose State
Week 9 (Oct. 26)						
Week 10 (Nov. 2)						
Week 11 (Nov. 9)						

=== Postseason honors ===
Unanimous selections in bold.

**2026 Mountain West Men's Soccer Individual Awards**
Award	Recipient(s)
Offensive Player of the Year	
Midfielder of the Year	
Defensive Player of the Year	
Goalkeeper of the Year	
Coach of the Year	
Freshman of the Year	

**2026 Mountain West Men's Soccer All-Conference Teams**
First Team Honorees	Second Team Honorees	All-Freshman Team Honorees	Sportsmanship Team Honorees

== MLS SuperDraft ==
=== Total picks by school ===
Team	Round 1	Round 2	Round 3	Total
Air Force				
Grand Canyon				
San José State				
UC Davis				
UNLV				
Utah Tech				
Total				

=== List of selections ===
Round	Pick #	MLS team	Player	Position	College
