= Bill Elliott (soccer) =

American college soccer coach

Current position
- Title: Head coach
- Team: West Florida
- Conference: Gulf South Conference
- Record: 284–125–45 (.661)

Biographical details
- Education: University of Tennessee (B.S., M.S.)

Playing career
- ?–1991: Tennessee Volunteers
- 1993–1994: Chattanooga Express (USISL)
- 1997: Mobile Revelers (USL II)
- 1998: Pensacola Barracudas

Coaching career (HC unless noted)
- 1992: Maryville (assistant)
- 1993–1994: Tennessee Wesleyan (men's & women's)
- 1995–2001: West Florida (women's)
- 1995–present: West Florida (men's)
- 2012–2018: Chattanooga FC

Accomplishments and honors

Championships
- 10× Gulf South Conference regular season (men's); 7× NPSL Southeast Conference (Chattanooga FC); 3× NPSL South Region (Chattanooga FC); 2015 USASA National Amateur Championship (Chattanooga FC)

Awards
- 8× Gulf South Conference Coach of the Year (men's); 3× South Region Coach of the Year; GSC Coach of the Decade (2010–2019); NPSL National Coach of the Year (2014); Alexander Arellano Memorial Trophy (2016); Inducted into Chattanooga FC Hall of Legends (2024)

Bill Elliott is an American college soccer coach who has served as the head coach of the University of West Florida Argonauts men's soccer team since 1995.

== Playing career ==
Elliott began his soccer career at Hixson High School in Chattanooga, Tennessee, where he served as senior captain and led the team to a second-place finish in the state championship.

He went on to play NCAA Division I soccer for the University of Tennessee Volunteers, while earning his bachelor's degree in business administration (1991) and master's degree in recreation and sports management (1993).

Following college, Elliott played semi-professional soccer in the United States Interregional Soccer League (USISL) with the Chattanooga Express, contributing to their runner-up finish at the 1993–94 Indoor Soccer National Championships. In 1997, he joined the USL II Mobile Revelers as a player (starting the season) before being promoted mid-season to player-head coach. The following year, in 1998, he played and served as an assistant coach for the Pensacola Barracudas.

== Coaching career ==
=== Maryville College ===
Elliott began his coaching career as an assistant at Maryville College in 1992. He then served as head coach for both the men's and women's teams at Tennessee Wesleyan University from 1993 to 1994, leading both to playoff appearances.

=== West Florida ===
In 1995, Elliott joined the University of West Florida, initially coaching both the men's and women's soccer teams. He stepped down from the women's program after 2001 (98–34–6 record, .732 winning percentage) to focus on the men's team.

The Argonauts have won 10 Gulf South Conference (GSC) championships (the most in conference history), made 19 GSC Tournament appearances, and reached the NCAA Division II Tournament seven times, including a semifinal run in 2006.

Elliott has earned 8 GSC Coach of the Year awards (men's), 3 South Region Coach of the Year honors, and was named GSC Coach of the Decade for 2010–2019. In 2024, he was recognized again as GSC Coach of the Year after leading the team to an undefeated conference record.

He led UWF to an undefeated 2024 GSC regular season (7–0–4) and the 2025 GSC Championship (2–0 win over Mississippi College).

=== Chattanooga FC ===
Beyond college, Elliott coached Chattanooga FC in the National Premier Soccer League (NPSL) from 2012 to 2018 (plus later roles), achieving a 97-28-34 record, seven Southeast Conference titles, three South Region titles, and three national finalist appearances. He won the NPSL Alexander Arellano Memorial Trophy three times (2014–2016) and was inducted into the Chattanooga FC Hall of Legends in 2024.
