= West Chester, Ohio =

West Chester, Ohio, can refer to:

- West Chester Township, Butler County, Ohio, a civil township of southwestern Ohio
- Olde West Chester, Ohio, the original settlement that gave its name to the township
- West Chester, Tuscarawas County, Ohio, an unincorporated community in Tuscarawas County
