= Gershon Henry =

Finnish footballer (born 2006)

Personal information
- Date of birth: 7 June 2006 (age 20)
- Place of birth: Ghana
- Height: 1.85 m (6 ft 1 in)
- Position: Centre back

Team information
- Current team: Saint Louis Billikens
- Number: 3

Youth career
- 2021–2024: Real Salt Lake

College career
| Years | Team | Apps | (Gls) |
| 2024– | Saint Louis Billikens | 12 | (0) |

Senior career*
| Years | Team | Apps | (Gls) |
| 2022–2024 | Real Monarchs | 9 | (1) |
| 2025 | Kalamazoo FC | 0 | (0) |

International career^{‡}
- United States U15
| 2022 | United States U17 | 2 | (0) |
| 2023 | Finland U17 | 3 | (0) |
| 2023– | Finland U18 | 3 | (0) |
- * Club domestic league appearances and goals as of 4 July 2025 ‡ National team caps and goals as of 24 March 2024

Gershon Henry (born 7 June 2006) is a Finnish professional football player who plays as a centre back for Saint Louis Billikens in the Atlantic 10 Conference, and the Finland under-18 national team.

== Career ==
Henry made his senior debut with Real Monarchs in MLS Next Pro in 2022.

In July 2023, Henry was one of the three Real Salt Lake academy players to trial with Danish club Brøndby IF.

Henry committed to Saint Louis University, starting in 2024, and joined Saint Louis Billikens team.

== International career ==
Henry has represented USA at under-15 and under-17 youth levels before switching his allegiance to Finland. On 31 October 2023, he was called up to Finland under-18 national team for two friendly matches against Austria.

== Personal life ==
Henry was born in Ghana, and was subsequently adopted by his Finnish mother and American father. He is eligible to represent Finland, Ghana, and United States.
