= 2026 Southern Conference men's soccer tournament =

- Classification: Division I
- Teams: 7
- Matches: 6
- Attendance: 3,322
- Site: Campus Sites (Higher seed)
- Champions: Liberty (1st title)
- Winning coach: Scott Wells (1st title)
- MVP: Samson Kpardeh (Liberty)
- Broadcast: ESPN+

2026 Southern Conference men's soccer standings
	Conf.					Overall
Team	W		L		T	W		L		T
Furman †	3	–	1	–	2	7	–	3	–	6
Wofford †	3	–	1	–	2	8	–	4	–	4
UNC Greensboro	2	–	0	–	4	5	–	2	–	9
East Tennessee State	2	–	0	–	4	7	–	6	–	5
Liberty	3	–	3	–	0	6	–	7	–	2
VMI	1	–	5	–	0	6	–	12	–	1
Mercer	0	–	4	–	2	0	–	13	–	5
† – Conference champion ‡– 2026 SoCon tournament champion + – At-large invitation to the 2026 NCAA tournament; As of November 3, 2026; Rankings from United Soccer Coaches; Source: SoCon

The 2026 Southern Conference men's soccer tournament was the postseason men's soccer tournament for the Southern Conference held from November 3 through November 14, 2026. The tournament was held at campus sites, with the higher seed hosting. The seven-team single-elimination tournament consisted of four rounds based on seeding from regular season conference play. The Furman Paladins were the defending champions. Furman were unable to defend its title, losing to Liberty in the semifinals. Liberty defeated third seed UNC Greensboro 1–0 in the final. This was the first Southern Conference tournament title for the Liberty men's soccer program, and their third total conference tournament title. As tournament champions, Liberty earned the Southern Conference's automatic berth into the 2026 NCAA Division I men's soccer tournament.

== Seeding ==
All seven Southern Conference men's soccer programs participated for the 2026 Tournament. Teams were seeded based on their regular season records. Tiebreakers were used to determine the seedings of teams who finished with identical conference records. A tiebreaker was required to determine the first and second seeds, as well as the third and fourth seeds. Furman and Wofford both finished with 3–1–2 regular season records. The two teams met on October 31. Furman prevailed 4–1, and earned the top seed.

Seed	School	Conference Record	Points
1	Furman	3–1–2	11
2	Wofford	3–1–2	11
3	UNC Greensboro	2–0–4	10
4	East Tennessee State	2–0–4	10
5	Liberty	3–3–0	9
6	VMI	1–5–0	3
7	Mercer	0–4–2	2

== Bracket ==
First round Tuesday, Nov. 3
6	VMI	1
7	Mercer	0

Quarterfinals; Thursday, Nov. 5
3	UNC Greensboro	4
6	VMI	1
4	East Tennessee State	2 (1)
5	Liberty (pen.)	2 (3)

Semifinals; Sunday, Nov. 8
2	Wofford	0
3	UNC Greensboro	1
1	Furman	2
5	Liberty	3

Final; Saturday, Nov. 14
3	UNC Greensboro	0
5	Liberty	1

== Schedule ==
=== First round ===
November 3, 2026	#6 VMI	1–0	#7 Mercer	Lexington, VA
12:30 p.m. EST	Yeirin Mejia 12'	Report		Stadium: Patchin Field; Attendance: 465

=== Quarterfinals ===
November 5, 2026	#3 UNC Greensboro	4–1	#6 VMI	Greensboro, NC
5:00 p.m. EST	Caleb Borneo 42'; Sho Haggerty 47', 57', 62'	Report	(yellow card) 22' Ian Joya; (yellow card) 58' Jack Miller; (yellow card) 59' Amari Benjamin; (yellow card) 62' (yellow-red card) 66' (goal) 65' Jaime Loya; (yellow card) 63' (red card) 63' Team; (yellow card) 71' Ben Bruzonic; (yellow card) 86' Conner Reid	Stadium: UNCG Soccer Stadium; Attendance: 372; Referee: Sorin Stoica; Assistant referees: Rick Rogers; Chris Turner; Fourth official: Khadime Sabara

November 5, 2026	#4 East Tennessee State	2–2 (a.e.t.) (1–3 p)	#5 Liberty	Johnson City, TN
3:00 p.m. EST	Marko Odorcic 10', 57'; Hugo Martinez (yellow card) 34'; Mateo Garcia (yellow card) 49' (yellow-red card) 84'; Junyoung Bae (yellow card) 57'; Team (yellow card) 57'	Report	(yellow card) 27' Oscar Vallejo; (yellow card) 29' (goal) 34', 54' Samson Kpardeh; (yellow card) 54' Roope Salo; (yellow card) 59' Kyohei Eguchi; (yellow card) 109' Team	Stadium: Summers-Taylor Stadium; Attendance: 225; Referee: Otto Leon; Assistant referees: Tyler Bost; Gunwan Park; Fourth official: Ralph Polson
	Penalties
	Elliot Edwards (penalty missed); Joe Gonzalez (penalty scored); Matias Delellis (penalty missed); Gavin Dick (penalty missed)		Samson Kpardeh (penalty scored); Ronnie Gorman (penalty missed); Lachlan Middleton (penalty scored); Roope Salo (penalty scored)

=== Semifinals ===
November 8, 2026	#2 Wofford	0–1	#3 UNC Greensboro	Spartanburg, SC
5:00 p.m. EST	Franklin Spires (yellow card) 66'; Team (yellow card) 68'; Fabian Menedez (yellow card) 70'	Report	66' Pablo Torre; (yellow card) 82' Mathis Robinand; (yellow card) 90' Mohammed Sumaila	Stadium: Snyder Field; Attendance: 523; Referee: Daniel Radford; Assistant referees: Carmen Serbio; Robert Dale; Fourth official: Howard Ash

November 8, 2026	#1 Furman	2–3	#5 Liberty	Greenville, SC
7:00 p.m. EST	Braden Dunham 37', 72'; Diego Hernandez (yellow card) 38'; Trip Campbell (yellow card) 43'; Team (yellow card) 68'	Report	(yellow card) 21' Oscar Vallejo; 42' (red card) 68' Goncalo Sousa; 49' Pablo Matavele; (yellow card) 56' Ronnie Gorman; (yellow card) 60' Nik Pirecnik; (yellow card) 68' Team; (yellow card) 72' Team; 79' Lachlan Middleton; (yellow card) 79' Dan Rose	Stadium: Stone III Stadium; Attendance: 485; Referee: Daniel Benson; Assistant referees: Tyler Bost; Luis Soro; Fourth official: Khadime Sabara

=== Final ===
November 14, 2026	#3 UNC Greensboro	0–1	#5 Liberty	Greensboro, NC
6:00 p.m. EST	Tiago Campos (yellow card) 75'	Report	(yellow card) 33' Ronnie Gorman; 70' (yellow card) 83' Samson Kpardeh	Stadium: UNCG Soccer Stadium; Attendance: 1,252; Referee: Dimitar Chavdarov; Assistant referees: Raymond Thomas; Rick Rogers; Fourth official: Richard Crowgey

== Statistics ==
=== Goalscorers ===
There were 17 goals scored in 6 matches, for an average of 2.83 goals per match.

3 goals

- Sho Haggerty – UNC Greensboro
- Samson Kpardeh – Liberty

2 goals

- Braden Dunham – Furman
- Marko Odorcic – ETSU

1 goal

- Caleb Borneo – UNC Greensboro
- Jaime Loya – VMI
- Pablo Matavele – Liberty
- Yeirin Mejia – VMI
- Lachlan Middleton – Liberty
- Goncalo Sousa – Liberty
- Pablo Torre – UNC Greensboro

== All-Tournament team ==
Player	Team
**Samson Kpardeh**	Liberty
Lachlan Middleton	Liberty
Roope Salo	Liberty
Oscar Vallejo	Liberty
Tiago Campos	UNC Greensboro
Trym Linberg	UNC Greensboro
Seth Wilson	UNC Greensboro
Braden Dunham	Furman
Jack Travis	Furman
Adam Celik	Wofford
Max Talley	Wofford

MVP in bold
