= 2026 Georgetown Hoyas men's soccer team =

American college soccer season

2026 Georgetown Hoyas men's soccer

Big East East Division champions
- Conference: Big East Conference
- U. Soc. Coaches poll: No. 1
- TopDrawerSoccer.com: No. 1
- Record: 14–1–1 (7–0–0 Big East)
- Head coach: Brian Wiese (21st season)
- Assistant coaches: Mike Montross; Adrian Molina-Diaz (1st season); Brian Bouhl
- Home stadium: Shaw Field

2026 Big East Conference men's soccer standings
	Conf.					Overall
Team	W		L		T	W		L		T
East
No. 1 Georgetown †	7	–	0	–	0	14	–	1	–	1
UConn	4	–	3	–	0	8	–	7	–	2
Seton Hall	3	–	2	–	2	6	–	4	–	6
St. John's	2	–	3	–	2	6	–	8	–	2
Providence	0	–	5	–	2	5	–	7	–	3
Villanova	0	–	6	–	1	5	–	8	–	3
Midwest
No. 10 Creighton	3	–	1	–	3	11	–	1	–	5
No. 5 Akron	3	–	1	–	3	10	–	1	–	4
Xavier	2	–	2	–	3	9	–	2	–	4
Marquette	3	–	4	–	0	10	–	5	–	1
Butler	3	–	2	–	2	3	–	8	–	3
DePaul	2	–	3	–	2	5	–	5	–	5
† – Division champion ‡ – 2026 Big East tournament champion + – At-large invitation to the 2026 NCAA tournament; As of November 3, 2026; Rankings from United Soccer Coaches; Source: Big East

The 2026 Georgetown Hoyas men's soccer team represents Georgetown University during the 2026 NCAA Division I men's soccer season. The Hoyas are led by head coach Brian Wiese, in his twenty-first season. They play their home games at Shaw Field in Washington, D.C. This is the team's 75th season playing organized men's college soccer, and they play in the Big East Conference.

The two-time defending Big East champions began the season ranked fifth and were picked first in the Big East East Division preseason coaches' poll, with Mitchell Baker named Preseason Offensive Player of the Year and Tate Lampman Preseason Defensive Player of the Year. After opening with a 1–1 draw against North Carolina, the Hoyas won 3–0 at 19th-ranked Duke and 3–0 over tenth-ranked Oregon State. Their only loss of the regular season came on September 7, 3–2 at second-ranked Maryland. Georgetown then won ten straight matches, including a 5–1 win over 23rd-ranked High Point, a 6–1 win at seventh-ranked Pittsburgh and a 5–3 Senior Night win over previously unbeaten Creighton, in which the teams combined for eight first-half goals. The Hoyas went 7–0–0 in Big East play to clinch the East Division regular-season title and the top seed in the Big East Tournament, and rose to first in the United Soccer Coaches poll on November 3.

Georgetown is 14–1–1 entering its regular-season finale at UConn on November 6. Baker and Matthew Van Horn lead the team with eleven goals each, and Van Horn has been named Big East Offensive Player of the Week three times.

== Previous season ==
The Hoyas won the Big East East Division in 2025 and, as the top seed in the Big East Tournament, beat third seed UConn 3–1 in the final for back-to-back conference tournament titles and the seventh in program history. Georgetown received the seventh overall seed in the NCAA Tournament, beat UCF in the Second Round and High Point in the Third Round, then lost to fifteenth seed NC State at home in the Quarterfinals to finish the season 14–4–4.

== Player movement ==
=== Players leaving ===
Departures
Name	Number	Pos.	Height	Weight	Year	Hometown	Reason for Departure
Tenzing Manske	1	GK	6'1"	195	Senior	Santa Fe, New Mexico	Graduated
Miles Avery	5	DF	6'0"	180	Senior	Washington, D.C.	Transferred to Portland
Diego Letayf	6	MF	5'10"	182	Senior	Southlake, Texas	Graduated
Max Viera	7	MF	5'9"	158	Senior	Burbank, Illinois	Graduated
Julian Barrios Cristales	17	MF	5'7"	155	Senior	Chesapeake, Virginia	Graduated
Tim Logan	18	MF	5'9"	148	Freshman	Florham Park, New Jersey	Transferred to Stanford
Zach Zengue	19	MF	5'9"	160	Senior	North Oaks, Minnesota	Graduated

Mitchell Baker and Aidan Godinho were selected 10th and 46th overall in the 2026 MLS SuperDraft, by the Colorado Rapids and CF Montréal respectively, but returned to Georgetown for the 2026 season.

=== Players arriving ===
==== Recruiting class ====
Name	Nat.	Hometown	Club / School
Emmanuel Marmolejo; GK	CAN	Milton, Ontario	Berkshire School
Kamil Abdul Nafeo; DF	GHA	Tamale, Ghana	Right to Dream Academy
Max Nelsen; MF	USA	Washington, D.C.	Bethesda Soccer Club
Terrance Reynolds; MF	USA	Brentwood, Tennessee	Tennessee Soccer Club
Andrew Richman; MF	USA	Mechanicsville, Virginia	Richmond United
Stan Rzeznik; MF	POL	Poznań, Poland	Royal Russell School
Noah Strellnauer; MF	USA	Las Vegas, Nevada	Colorado Rapids Academy

== Squad ==
=== Roster ===
As of November 6, 2026

Note: Flags indicate national team as defined under FIFA eligibility rules; some limited exceptions apply. Players may hold more than one non-FIFA nationality.

No.	Pos.	Nation	Player
0	GK	CAN	Emmanuel Marmolejo
1	GK	USA	Charlie DeMarco
2	DF	USA	Jack Lindimore
3	MF	USA	Eric Howard
4	DF	USA	Oliver Stafford
5	DF	ENG	Will Caldwell
6	MF	USA	Aidan Godinho
7	FW	ENG	Jordi Sada-Paz
8	MF	USA	Matthew Van Horn
9	FW	IDN	Mitchell Baker
10	MF	USA	Mateo Ponce Ocampo
11	MF	USA	David Urrutia
12	MF	USA	Casey Milliken
13	MF	USA	Terrance Reynolds

No.	Pos.	Nation	Player
14	MF	USA	Noah Satriano
15	MF	GRE	Loukas Maroutsis
16	MF	USA	Jack Brown
17	DF	GHA	Kamil Abdul Nafeo
18	MF	USA	Max Nelsen
19	MF	USA	Charlie Rosenthal
20	MF	USA	Matthew Helfrich
21	MF	USA	Zayan Ahmed
22	MF	USA	Jack Heaps
23	MF	USA	Andrew Richman
25	DF	USA	Tate Lampman
27	MF	POL	Stan Rzeznik
28	MF	USA	Noah Strellnauer
30	GK	UKR	Dmytro Torubara

=== Team management ===
Position	Staff
Head coach	(United States) Brian Wiese
Assistant coach	Mike Montross
Assistant coach	Adrian Molina-Diaz
Assistant coach/Director of operations	Brian Bouhl

== Schedule ==
Date Time, TV	Rank^{#}	Opponent^{#}	Result	Record	Site (Attendance) City, State
Regular season
August 20*; 7:30 p.m.	No. 5	North Carolina	T 1–1	0–0–1	Shaw Field (741); Washington, DC
August 23*; 7:30 p.m.	No. 5	Rutgers	W 2–1	1–0–1	Shaw Field (1,197); Washington, DC
August 27*; 5:00 p.m.	No. 6	Delaware	W 1–0	2–0–1	Shaw Field (571); Washington, DC
August 30*; 6:00 p.m.	No. 6	at No. 19 Duke	W 3–0	3–0–1	Koskinen Stadium (1,005); Durham, NC
September 4*; 7:00 p.m.	No. 5	No. 10 Oregon State	W 3–0	4–0–1	Shaw Field (705); Washington, DC
September 7*; 7:00 p.m.	No. 5	at No. 2 Maryland	L 2–3	4–1–1	Ludwig Field (6,110); College Park, MD
September 11*; 7:00 p.m.	No. 4	No. 23 High Point	W 5–1	5–1–1	Shaw Field (759); Washington, DC
September 18; 7:00 p.m.	No. 9	Marquette	W 3–0	6–1–1 (1–0–0)	Shaw Field (717); Washington, DC
September 21*; 7:00 p.m.	No. 9	Evansville	W 3–2	7–1–1	Shaw Field (238); Washington, DC
September 25; 7:00 p.m.	No. 5	at No. 17 Akron	W 3–1	8–1–1 (2–0–0)	FirstEnergy Stadium (1,860); Akron, OH
October 2; 7:00 p.m.	No. 3	Providence	W 6–1	9–1–1 (3–0–0)	Shaw Field (611); Washington, DC
October 10; 7:00 p.m.	No. 3	at St. John's	W 3–0	10–1–1 (4–0–0)	Belson Stadium (716); Queens, NY
October 16; 5:00 p.m.	No. 3	Seton Hall	W 4–0	11–1–1 (5–0–0)	Shaw Field (927); Washington, DC
October 19*; 7:00 p.m.	No. 3	at No. 7 Pittsburgh	W 6–1	12–1–1	Ambrose Urbanic Field (541); Pittsburgh, PA
October 24; 12:00 p.m.	No. 2	at Villanova	W 2–0	13–1–1 (6–0–0)	Higgins Soccer Complex (604); Villanova, PA
October 30; 7:00 p.m.	No. 2	No. 8 Creighton	W 5–3	14–1–1 (7–0–0)	Shaw Field (1,261); Washington, DC
November 6; 7:00 p.m.	No. 1	at UConn			Morrone Stadium; Storrs, CT
*Non-conference game. ^{#}Rankings from United Soccer Coaches. (#) Tournament seedings in parentheses. All times are in Eastern.

== Goals record ==
Through October 30, 2026.

Rank	No.	Nat.	Po.	Name	Regular season	Big East Tournament	NCAA Tournament	Total
1	8	(United States)	MF	Matthew Van Horn	11	0	0	11
1	9	(Indonesia)	FW	Mitchell Baker	11	0	0	11
3	10	(United States)	MF	Mateo Ponce Ocampo	5	0	0	5
3	25	(United States)	DF	Tate Lampman	5	0	0	5
5	13	(United States)	MF	Terrance Reynolds	4	0	0	4
6	3	(United States)	MF	Eric Howard	3	0	0	3
6	16	(United States)	MF	Jack Brown	3	0	0	3
8	4	(United States)	DF	Oliver Stafford	1	0	0	1
8	6	(United States)	MF	Aidan Godinho	1	0	0	1
8	11	(United States)	MF	David Urrutia	1	0	0	1
8	12	(United States)	MF	Casey Milliken	1	0	0	1
8	14	(United States)	MF	Noah Satriano	1	0	0	1
8	19	(United States)	MF	Charlie Rosenthal	1	0	0	1
8	20	(United States)	MF	Matthew Helfrich	1	0	0	1
8	21	(United States)	MF	Zayan Ahmed	1	0	0	1
8	27	(Poland)	MF	Stan Rzeznik	1	0	0	1
8	28	(United States)	MF	Noah Strellnauer	1	0	0	1
Total					52	0	0	52

== Disciplinary record ==
Through October 30, 2026.

Rank	No.	Nat.	Po.	Name	Regular Season			Big East Tournament			NCAA Tournament			Total		
Rank	No.	Nat.	Po.	Name	Yellow card	(yellow card) (yellow-red card)	Red card	Yellow card	(yellow card) (yellow-red card)	Red card	Yellow card	(yellow card) (yellow-red card)	Red card	Yellow card	(yellow card) (yellow-red card)	Red card
1	3	(United States)	MF	Eric Howard	2	0	0	0	0	0	0	0	0	2	0	0
1	4	(United States)	DF	Oliver Stafford	2	0	0	0	0	0	0	0	0	2	0	0
1	6	(United States)	MF	Aidan Godinho	2	0	0	0	0	0	0	0	0	2	0	0
1	14	(United States)	MF	Noah Satriano	2	0	0	0	0	0	0	0	0	2	0	0
1	25	(United States)	DF	Tate Lampman	2	0	0	0	0	0	0	0	0	2	0	0
6	7	(England)	FW	Jordi Sada-Paz	1	0	0	0	0	0	0	0	0	1	0	0
6	9	(Indonesia)	FW	Mitchell Baker	1	0	0	0	0	0	0	0	0	1	0	0
6	11	(United States)	MF	David Urrutia	1	0	0	0	0	0	0	0	0	1	0	0
6	21	(United States)	MF	Zayan Ahmed	1	0	0	0	0	0	0	0	0	1	0	0
6	22	(United States)	MF	Jack Heaps	1	0	0	0	0	0	0	0	0	1	0	0
Total					15	0	0	0	0	0	0	0	0	15	0	0

== Awards and honors ==
Recipient	Award	Date	Ref.
Mitchell Baker	Big East Preseason Offensive Player of the Year	August 11	
Tate Lampman	Big East Preseason Defensive Player of the Year	August 11	
Matthew Van Horn	Preseason All-Big East Team	August 11	
Mitchell Baker	MAC Hermann Trophy Watch List	August 19	
Tate Lampman	Big East Defensive Player of the Week	August 31	
Tate Lampman	Big East Defensive Player of the Week	September 14	
Eric Howard	Big East Defensive Player of the Week	September 21	
Noah Strellnauer	Big East Freshman of the Week	September 21	
Matthew Van Horn	Big East Offensive Player of the Week	September 28	
Terrance Reynolds	Big East Freshman of the Week	October 5	
Terrance Reynolds	Big East Freshman of the Week	October 12	
Eric Howard	Big East Defensive Player of the Week	October 19	
Eric Howard	Big East Defensive Player of the Week	October 26	
Matthew Van Horn	Big East Offensive Player of the Week	October 26	
Matthew Van Horn	Big East Offensive Player of the Week	November 2	

== Rankings ==
Ranking movements Legend: ██ Increase in ranking ██ Decrease in ranking
	Week																
Poll	Pre	1	2	3	4	5	6	7	8	9	10	11	12	13	14	15	Final
United Soccer	5	6	5	4	9	5	3	3	3	2	2	1		Not released			
TopDrawer Soccer	5	5	9	10	5	13	9	5	5	3	2	2	1				
College Soccer News	3	3	3	3	6	5	3	3	3	2	1	1			Not released		
