= 2026 Ohio State Buckeyes men's soccer team =

American college soccer season

2026 Ohio State Buckeyes men's soccer
- Conference: Big Ten Conference
- Record: 8–6–2 (3–6–1 Big Ten)
- Head coach: Brian Maisonneuve (9th season)
- Assistant coaches: Matt Foldesy; Travis Morris; Corey Brueggeman
- Home stadium: Jesse Owens Memorial Stadium

2026 Big Ten Conference men's soccer standings
	Conf.						Overall
Team	W		L		T	PCT	W		L		T	PCT
No. 4 Indiana ‍†‍‍	7	–	1	–	2	.800	14	–	1	–	3	.861
No. 6 Washington ‍‍‍	6	–	2	–	2	.700	10	–	4	–	3	.676
No. 23 Rutgers ‍‍‍	6	–	3	–	1	.650	8	–	6	–	2	.563
No. 16 Michigan State ‍‍‍	5	–	3	–	2	.600	10	–	4	–	3	.676
No. 11 Maryland ‍‍‍	5	–	4	–	1	.550	11	–	4	–	1	.719
No. 25т UCLA ‍‍‍	4	–	3	–	3	.550	9	–	3	–	5	.676
No. 13 Wisconsin ‍‍‍	3	–	3	–	4	.500	10	–	3	–	4	.706
Northwestern ‍‍‍	3	–	4	–	3	.450	6	–	6	–	4	.500
Ohio State ‍‍‍	3	–	6	–	1	.350	8	–	6	–	2	.563
Michigan ‍‍‍	0	–	6	–	4	.200	3	–	8	–	5	.344
Penn State ‍‍‍	0	–	7	–	3	.150	3	–	9	–	3	.300
† – Conference champion ‡ – 2026 B1G tournament champion y – Invited to the 2026 NCAA Tournament; As of November 4, 2026; Rankings from United Soccer Coaches; Source: Big Ten

The 2026 Ohio State Buckeyes men's soccer team represents Ohio State University during the 2026 NCAA Division I men's soccer season. The Buckeyes are led by head coach Brian Maisonneuve, in his ninth season. They play their home games at Jesse Owens Memorial Stadium in Columbus, Ohio, and compete in the Big Ten Conference.

Ohio State began the season unranked, with a roster that included seven transfers. Kentucky transfer Isaiah Chisolm scored the only goal of a 1–0 season-opening win over Virginia Tech, and his hat-trick led a 5–0 win over Northern Kentucky on September 3, the first time in program history that Ohio State had held its first four opponents scoreless. After a 4–1 win at Kentucky completed a 5–0 start, the Buckeyes rose to third in the United Soccer Coaches poll. Chisolm, who had scored seven goals in his first four matches, then missed several weeks through injury, and the Buckeyes did not win in their first three Big Ten matches, including a 4–0 home loss to Washington. Junior defender Martin Wurschmidt scored twice in the final three minutes of a 2–1 win at Penn State on October 2, but Ohio State then lost four straight matches by one goal, to ranked opponents UCLA, Michigan State, Indiana and Maryland. A Senior Night win over Northwestern, in which Chisolm scored his eighth goal of the season, ended the losing run.

The Buckeyes closed the regular season with a 1–0 win at rival Michigan to finish 8–6–2 and 3–6–1 in Big Ten play. They did not qualify for the six-team Big Ten Tournament, and with a rating percentage index of 38 they will await the NCAA Tournament selection show on November 16 in hope of an at-large bid.

== Previous season ==
The Buckeyes began the 2025 season ranked third in the United Soccer Coaches preseason poll, but finished 6–10–0 and 3–7–0 in Big Ten play, ending the season with a 2–1 loss at Northwestern on November 7. Following the season, Aaron Hurge was named to the All-Big Ten Freshman Team.

== Player movement ==
=== Players leaving ===
Players leaving
Name	Number	Pos.	Height	Weight	Year	Hometown	Reason for Departure
Max Trejo	1	GK	6'2"	175	Redshirt Senior	Lawrence, Kansas	Graduated
Dyland Onwona-Agyeman	2	DF	6'0"	170	Redshirt Junior	Des Moines, Iowa	—
Nathan Demian	3	DF	5'10"	170	Redshirt Senior	Vancouver, Canada	Graduated
Nick McHenry	4	DF	6'3"	160	Sophomore	Loveland, Ohio	Transferred to Indiana
Johnny Rush	5	DF	5'11"	170	Sophomore	London, England	Transferred to UAB
Thomas Gilej	6	DF	6'3"	200	Graduate Student	Wuppertal, Germany	Graduated
Ashton Bilow	10	MF	5'10"	140	Senior	New Albany, Ohio	Graduated
Luciano Pechota	11	MF	5'6"	150	Senior	Avon, Ohio	Graduated
Anthony Faupel	16	FW	5'7"	160	Sophomore	St. Louis, Missouri	—
Donovan Williams	23	DF	5'11"	160	Senior	Pickerington, Ohio	Graduated
RJ Stoller	24	GK	6'2"	175	Redshirt Sophomore	Worthington, Ohio	—
Michael Ndiweni	25	FW	5'8"	170	Freshman	Newcastle upon Tyne, England	Transferred to FGCU
Tanner Creech	31	FW	6'3"	195	Senior	Cincinnati, Ohio	Graduated

=== Players arriving ===
==== Incoming transfers ====
Incoming transfers
Name	Number	Pos.	Height	Weight	Year	Hometown	Previous School
Christian Baumgartner	2	DF	5'10"	175	Graduate Student	New Lenox, Illinois	DePaul
Victor Labite	4	MF	6'3"	195	Junior	Normandy, France	Fairleigh Dickinson
Martin Wurschmidt	5	DF	6'1"	170	Junior	Stavern, Norway	Evansville
Isaiah Chisolm	9	FW	6'3"	200	Senior	Yorktown, Virginia	Kentucky
Josué Youta	11	FW	5'11"	165	Senior	Montreal, Canada	Daytona State
Ryan Hannosh	14	MF	5'8"	155	Senior	Farmington Hills, Michigan	Butler
Elijah Bishop	25	DF	6'3"	190	Graduate Student	Aurora, Colorado	Central Arkansas

==== Recruiting class ====
Name	Nat.	Hometown	Previous club / school
Ryan Sullivan; MF	USA	Columbus, Ohio	St. Charles Preparatory School
Bryce Ince-Lovelace; FW	USA	Cleveland, Ohio	St. Ignatius High School
Sam Trivisonno; FW	USA	Cleveland, Ohio	St. Ignatius High School
Mathew Samways; MF	USA	New Albany, Ohio	Sycamore High School
Jack Wayne; MF	USA	Flowery Branch, Georgia	Charleston Battery
Dylan Arrison; GK	USA	West Chester, Pennsylvania	Henderson High School
Slade Hall; GK	USA	McDonough, Georgia	—

== Squad ==
=== Roster ===
As of November 7, 2026

Note: Flags indicate national team as defined under FIFA eligibility rules; some limited exceptions apply. Players may hold more than one non-FIFA nationality.

No.	Pos.	Nation	Player
1	GK	USA	Patrick McLaughlin
2	DF	USA	Christian Baumgartner
3	DF	CAN	Joel Demian
4	MF	FRA	Victor Labite
5	DF	NOR	Martin Wurschmidt
6	MF	USA	Nick Skubis
7	FW	DEN	Will Arnesen
8	DF	USA	Andre Roberts
9	FW	USA	Isaiah Chisolm
10	MF	USA	Aaron Hurge
11	FW	CAN	Josué Youta
12	MF	USA	Ryan Sullivan
13	FW	USA	Bryce Ince-Lovelace
14	MF	USA	Ryan Hannosh
15	DF	USA	Ryan Townhill

No.	Pos.	Nation	Player
16	FW	USA	Sam Trivisonno
17	MF	USA	Mathew Samways
18	MF	USA	Jack Wayne
19	FW	USA	Nyle Waugh
20	MF	USA	Jacob Maisonneuve
21	DF	USA	Martin McLaughlin
23	FW	ENG	Marko Borkovic
24	GK	USA	Dylan Arrison
25	DF	USA	Elijah Bishop
26	MF	USA	Cole Evans
28	GK	USA	Luke Laramore
29	FW	USA	Zsombor Onodi
30	DF	USA	Justis Olorunto
32	GK	USA	Slade Hall

=== Team management ===
Position	Staff
Head coach	(United States) Brian Maisonneuve
Associate head coach	Matt Foldesy
Associate head coach	Travis Morris
Assistant coach	Corey Brueggeman

== Schedule ==
Date Time, TV	Rank^{#}	Opponent^{#}	Result	Record	Site (Attendance) City, State
Regular season
August 20*; 8:00 p.m., B1G+		Virginia Tech	W 1–0	1–0–0	Jesse Owens Memorial Stadium (1,266); Columbus, OH
August 24*; 7:00 p.m., B1G+		DePaul	W 6–0	2–0–0	Jesse Owens Memorial Stadium (769); Columbus, OH
August 28*; 8:00 p.m., B1G+	No. 22	Memphis	W 2–0	3–0–0	Jesse Owens Memorial Stadium (1,266); Columbus, OH
September 3*; 4:30 p.m., B1G+	No. 4	Northern Kentucky	W 5–0	4–0–0	Jesse Owens Memorial Stadium (656); Columbus, OH
September 8*; 7:30 p.m., ESPN+	No. 3	at Kentucky	W 4–1	5–0–0	Bell Soccer Complex (1,134); Lexington, KY
September 11; 8:00 p.m., B1G+	No. 3	at No. 8 Wisconsin	T 1–1	5–0–1 (0–0–1)	McClimon Soccer Complex (1,329); Madison, WI
September 18; 7:00 p.m., B1G+	No. 3	Rutgers	L 1–2	5–1–1 (0–1–1)	Jesse Owens Memorial Stadium (1,721); Columbus, OH
September 21; 7:00 p.m., BTN	No. 3	Washington	L 0–4	5–2–1 (0–2–1)	Jesse Owens Memorial Stadium (756); Columbus, OH
September 25*; 7:00 p.m., ESPN+	No. 12	at George Mason	T 1–1	5–2–2	George Mason Stadium (1,913); Fairfax, VA
October 2; 7:00 p.m., B1G+		at Penn State	W 2–1	6–2–2 (1–2–1)	Jeffrey Field (1,002); University Park, PA
October 10; 9:00 p.m., B1G+		at No. 21 UCLA	L 1–2	6–3–2 (1–3–1)	Wallis Annenberg Stadium (809); Los Angeles, CA
October 16; 7:00 p.m., B1G+		No. 12 Michigan State	L 2–3	6–4–2 (1–4–1)	Jesse Owens Memorial Stadium (1,112); Columbus, OH
October 20; 7:00 p.m., BTN		No. 4 Indiana	L 0–1	6–5–2 (1–5–1)	Jesse Owens Memorial Stadium (1,915); Columbus, OH
October 24; 7:00 p.m., B1G+		at No. 11 Maryland	L 0–1	6–6–2 (1–6–1)	Ludwig Field (4,082); College Park, MD
October 30; 7:00 p.m., B1G+		Northwestern	W 2–1	7–6–2 (2–6–1)	Jesse Owens Memorial Stadium (936); Columbus, OH
November 4; 6:00 p.m., B1G+		at Michigan	W 1–0	8–6–2 (3–6–1)	U-M Soccer Stadium (1,051); Ann Arbor, MI
*Non-conference game. ^{#}Rankings from United Soccer Coaches. (#) Tournament seedings in parentheses. All times are in Eastern.

== Goals record ==
Through November 4, 2026.

Rank	No.	Nat.	Po.	Name	Regular season	Big Ten Tournament	NCAA Tournament	Total
1	9	(United States)	FW	Isaiah Chisolm	8	0	0	8
2	5	(Norway)	DF	Martin Wurschmidt	6	0	0	6
3	19	(United States)	FW	Nyle Waugh	4	0	0	4
4	10	(United States)	MF	Aaron Hurge	3	0	0	3
5	2	(United States)	DF	Christian Baumgartner	2	0	0	2
5	14	(United States)	MF	Ryan Hannosh	2	0	0	2
7	11	(Canada)	FW	Josué Youta	1	0	0	1
7	18	(United States)	MF	Jack Wayne	1	0	0	1
7	21	(United States)	DF	Martin McLaughlin	1	0	0	1
7	26	(United States)	MF	Cole Evans	1	0	0	1
Total					29	0	0	29

== Disciplinary record ==
Through November 4, 2026. Does not include one caution issued to the Ohio State bench.

Rank	No.	Nat.	Po.	Name	Regular Season			Big Ten Tournament			NCAA Tournament			Total		
Rank	No.	Nat.	Po.	Name	Yellow card	(yellow card) (yellow-red card)	Red card	Yellow card	(yellow card) (yellow-red card)	Red card	Yellow card	(yellow card) (yellow-red card)	Red card	Yellow card	(yellow card) (yellow-red card)	Red card
1	5	(Norway)	DF	Martin Wurschmidt	4	0	0	0	0	0	0	0	0	4	0	0
2	6	(United States)	MF	Nick Skubis	2	1	0	0	0	0	0	0	0	2	1	0
3	8	(United States)	DF	Andre Roberts	3	0	0	0	0	0	0	0	0	3	0	0
3	10	(United States)	MF	Aaron Hurge	3	0	0	0	0	0	0	0	0	3	0	0
5	14	(United States)	MF	Ryan Hannosh	1	0	1	0	0	0	0	0	0	1	0	1
6	3	(Canada)	DF	Joel Demian	0	0	1	0	0	0	0	0	0	0	0	1
6	9	(United States)	FW	Isaiah Chisolm	0	0	1	0	0	0	0	0	0	0	0	1
6	19	(United States)	FW	Nyle Waugh	0	0	1	0	0	0	0	0	0	0	0	1
6	32	(United States)	GK	Slade Hall	0	0	1	0	0	0	0	0	0	0	0	1
10	1	(United States)	GK	Patrick McLaughlin	1	0	0	0	0	0	0	0	0	1	0	0
10	18	(United States)	MF	Jack Wayne	1	0	0	0	0	0	0	0	0	1	0	0
10	21	(United States)	DF	Martin McLaughlin	1	0	0	0	0	0	0	0	0	1	0	0
10	25	(United States)	DF	Elijah Bishop	1	0	0	0	0	0	0	0	0	1	0	0
10	30	(United States)	DF	Justis Olorunto	1	0	0	0	0	0	0	0	0	1	0	0
Total					18	1	5	0	0	0	0	0	0	18	1	5

== Awards and honors ==
Recipient	Award	Date	Ref.
Martin Wurschmidt	Big Ten Defensive Player of the Week	August 25	
Martin Wurschmidt	TopDrawerSoccer Team of the Week	September 1	
Elijah Bishop	Big Ten Defensive Player of the Week	September 8	
Isaiah Chisolm	Hermann Trophy Midseason Watch List	October 2	
Martin Wurschmidt	Big Ten Offensive Player of the Week	October 6	

== Rankings ==
Ranking movements Legend: ██ Increase in ranking ██ Decrease in ranking — = Not ranked RV = Received votes
	Week																
Poll	Pre	1	2	3	4	5	6	7	8	9	10	11	12	13	14	15	Final
United Soccer	—	22	4	3	3	12	RV	RV	—	—	—	—		Not released			
TopDrawer Soccer	—	—	—	7	4	5	13	—	—	—	—	—	—				
College Soccer News	—	21	12	7	3	7	16	RV	—	—	—	—			Not released		
