= 2026 Big Ten men's soccer tournament =

- Classification: Division I
- Teams: 6
- Matches: 5
- Attendance: 8,530
- Site: Bill Armstrong Stadium; Bloomington, Indiana
- Champions: Indiana (17th title)
- Winning coach: Todd Yeagley (6th title)
- MVP: Easton Bogard (Indiana)
- Broadcast: BTN

2026 Big Ten Conference men's soccer standings
	Conf.						Overall
Team	W		L		T	PCT	W		L		T	PCT
No. 3 Indiana ‍†‍‡‍^{y}	7	–	1	–	2	.800	15	–	1	–	4	.850
No. 11 Washington ‍‍‍^{y}	6	–	2	–	2	.700	10	–	4	–	5	.658
No. 15 Rutgers ‍‍‍^{y}	6	–	3	–	1	.650	9	–	6	–	3	.583
No. 22 Michigan State ‍‍‍^{y}	5	–	3	–	2	.600	10	–	5	–	3	.639
No. 9 Maryland ‍‍‍^{y}	5	–	4	–	1	.550	12	–	5	–	1	.694
No. 18 UCLA ‍‍‍^{y}	4	–	3	–	3	.550	9	–	4	–	5	.639
No. 24т Wisconsin ‍‍‍^{y}	3	–	3	–	4	.500	10	–	3	–	4	.706
Northwestern ‍‍‍	3	–	4	–	3	.450	6	–	6	–	4	.500
Ohio State ‍‍‍	3	–	6	–	1	.350	8	–	6	–	2	.563
Michigan ‍‍‍	0	–	6	–	4	.200	3	–	8	–	5	.344
Penn State ‍‍‍	0	–	7	–	3	.150	3	–	9	–	3	.300
† – Conference champion ‡ – 2026 B1G tournament champion y – Invited to the 2026 NCAA Tournament; As of November 15, 2026; Rankings from United Soccer Coaches; Source: Big Ten

The 2026 Big Ten Conference men's soccer tournament was the post-season men's soccer tournament for the Big Ten Conference held from November 8 to 15, 2026. Defending champions, Washington, lost to first-seeded Indiana in the finals. As tournament champions, Indiana earned the Big Ten's automatic place in the 2026 NCAA Division I men's soccer tournament.

== Seeding ==
The top six teams in the regular season earned a spot in the 2026 tournament. Teams were seeded based on regular season conference record and tiebreakers were used to determine seedings of teams that finished with the same record.

Seed	School	Conference record	Points
1	Indiana	7–1–2	23
2	Washington	6–2–2	20
3	Rutgers	6–3–1	19
4	Michigan State	5–3–2	17
5	Maryland	5–4–1	16
6	UCLA	4–3–3	15

== Bracket ==
Quarterfinals; November 8
4	Michigan State	1
5	Maryland	2
3	Rutgers	2
6	UCLA	0

Semifinals
1	Indiana	1
4	Maryland	0
2	Washington	1 (5)
2	Rutgers	1 (4)

Finals
1	Indiana	2 (4)
2	Washington	2 (3)

== Results ==
=== Quarterfinals ===
November 8, 2026	No. 4 Michigan State	1-2	No. 5 Maryland	Bloomington, IN
1:00 p.m.	(yellow card) 6' Luke Spadafora; (red card) 38' Brandon Munson; 87' Mohamed Saad	Report	32' Albi Ndrenika; 50' Marco Wright; (yellow card) 63' Maxwell Sekyi	Stadium: Bill Armstrong Stadium; Attendance: 201; Referee: Justin St. Pierre; Assistant referees: Baboucarr Jallow; Daniel Cota; Fourth official: Abdu Bensalah

November 8, 2026	No. 3 Rutgers	2-0	No. 6 UCLA	Seattle, WA
3:00 p.m.	32' Joshua Jerome; 47' Matty Lynch; (yellow card) 76' Francesco Di Ponzio	Report	(yellow card) 18' Mathis Richter; (yellow card) 75' Tamir Ratoviz	Stadium: Husky Soccer Stadium; Attendance: 95; Referee: Youssef Elmessoussi; Assistant referees: Sean West; Shawn Westerfield; Fourth official: Justin Rose

=== Semifinals ===
November 11, 2026	No. 2 Indiana	1-0	No. 4 Maryland	Bloomington, IN
8:15 p.m.	47' Easton Bogard	Report	(yellow card) 74' Albi Ndrenika	Stadium: Bill Armstrong Stadium; Attendance: 1845; Referee: Austin Saini; Assistant referees: Jacob Little; Christian Little; Fourth official: Saki Atsas

November 11, 2026	No. 2 Washington	1-1 (a.e.t.) (3-2 p)	No. 3 Rutgers	Seattle, WA
6:00 p.m.	76' Zach Ramsey; (yellow card) 80' Harrison Bertos; (yellow card) 83' Shaun Brun; (yellow card) 87' Egor Akulov	Report	(yellow card) 31' Pius Ssebulime; (yellow card) 43' Nick Collins; (yellow card) 62' Zach Mastrodimos; 65' Simon Gorczowski	Stadium: Husky Soccer Stadium; Attendance: 2172; Referee: Victor Borges; Assistant referees: Art Arustamyan; Chris Turner; Fourth official: Vitali Hantsevich
	Penalties
	Zach Ramsey (penalty missed); Alex Hall (penalty scored); Egor Akulov (penalty scored); Kevin Hernandez (penalty missed); Clarens Dollin (penalty scored)		(penalty missed) Nick Collins; (penalty missed) William Pierce; (penalty scored) Dan Karsten; (penalty scored) Francesco Di Ponzio; (penalty missed) Amer Lukovic

=== Final ===
November 15, 2026	No. 1 Indiana	2–2 (a.e.t.) (3–2 p)	No. 2 Washington	Bloomington, IN
3:00 p.m.	56' Easton Bogard; 75' Oliver Moller-Jensen; (yellow card) 104' Josh Maher	Report	21' Shaun Brun; (yellow card) 34' Cameron Cruz; 77' Alex Hall	Stadium: Bill Armstrong Stadium; Attendance: 4217; Referee: Nikola Aleksic; Assistant referees: Cory Richardson; Shane Richards; Fourth official: Dimitrios Katsimingos
	Penalties
	Oliver Moller-Jensen (penalty missed); Michal Mroz (penalty scored); Charlie Heuer (penalty scored); Josh Maher (penalty scored)		(penalty missed) Zach Ramsey; (penalty scored) Alex Hall; (penalty scored) Egor Akulov; (penalty missed) Asher Hestad

== Statistics ==
=== Goalscorers ===
2 goals

- (United States) Easton Bogard - Indiana

1 goal

- (United States) Mohamed Saad - Michigan State
- (United States) Albi Ndrenika - Maryland
- (United States) Marco Wright - Maryland
- (United States) Oliver Moller-Jensen - Indiana
- (United States) Zach Ramsey - Washington
- (United States) Shaun Brun - Washington
- (United States) Alex Hall - Washington
- (United States) Simon Gorczowski - Rutgers

== All-Tournament team ==
Player	Team
**2026 B1G Men's Soccer All-Tournament team**
**Easton Bogard**	Indiana
Oliver Moller-Jensen	Indiana
Michal Mroz	Indiana
Nolan Kinsella	Indiana
Laurin Mack	Maryland
Albi Ndrenika	Maryland
Rafael Ponce de Leon	Rutgers
Pius Ssebulime	Rutgers
Shaun Brun	Washington
Zach Ramsey	Washington
Stockton Short	Washington

MVP in Bold
