= 2026 UCLA Bruins men's soccer team =

American college soccer season

2026 UCLA Bruins men's soccer
- Conference: Big Ten Conference
- U. Soc. Coaches poll: No. 25
- TopDrawerSoccer.com: No. 22
- Record: 9–3–5 (4–3–3 Big Ten)
- Head coach: Ryan Jorden (8th season)
- Assistant coaches: Sergi Nus; Joey O'Keefe; Kary Whitney
- Home stadium: Wallis Annenberg Stadium

2026 Big Ten Conference men's soccer standings
	Conf.						Overall
Team	W		L		T	PCT	W		L		T	PCT
No. 4 Indiana ‍†‍‍	7	–	1	–	2	.800	14	–	1	–	3	.861
No. 6 Washington ‍‍‍	6	–	2	–	2	.700	10	–	4	–	3	.676
No. 23 Rutgers ‍‍‍	6	–	3	–	1	.650	8	–	6	–	2	.563
No. 16 Michigan State ‍‍‍	5	–	3	–	2	.600	10	–	4	–	3	.676
No. 11 Maryland ‍‍‍	5	–	4	–	1	.550	11	–	4	–	1	.719
No. 25т UCLA ‍‍‍	4	–	3	–	3	.550	9	–	3	–	5	.676
No. 13 Wisconsin ‍‍‍	3	–	3	–	4	.500	10	–	3	–	4	.706
Northwestern ‍‍‍	3	–	4	–	3	.450	6	–	6	–	4	.500
Ohio State ‍‍‍	3	–	6	–	1	.350	8	–	6	–	2	.563
Michigan ‍‍‍	0	–	6	–	4	.200	3	–	8	–	5	.344
Penn State ‍‍‍	0	–	7	–	3	.150	3	–	9	–	3	.300
† – Conference champion ‡ – 2026 B1G tournament champion y – Invited to the 2026 NCAA Tournament; As of November 4, 2026; Rankings from United Soccer Coaches; Source: Big Ten

The 2026 UCLA Bruins men's soccer team represents the University of California, Los Angeles during the 2026 NCAA Division I men's soccer season. The Bruins are led by head coach Ryan Jorden, in his eighth season. They play their home games at Wallis Annenberg Stadium in Los Angeles, as members of the Big Ten Conference.

The Bruins entered the season as reigning Big Ten Tournament champions, with a roster rebuilt around fourteen transfers and three freshmen after leading scorer Sergi Solans Ormo left for Real Salt Lake. They opened with a 2–1 upset at eleventh-ranked Virginia, with goals from transfers Logan Hall and Zach Neuls, and were unbeaten and ranked eleventh after five matches. After a 3–1 loss at Rutgers in their Big Ten opener and draws with Michigan and fourth-ranked Maryland, the Bruins won four straight matches. The streak included their first conference win, 4–2 at Penn State, and a 3–0 home win over eighth-ranked Michigan State, the Spartans' first outright defeat of the season. Tre Wright was named Big Ten Defensive Player of the Week on October 6. A 4–3 loss at eighteenth-ranked Wisconsin ended the streak, and a 3–1 defeat to fourth-ranked Indiana was the Bruins' first home loss of the season. UCLA closed the regular season with a 1–0 win over sixth-ranked Washington, the reigning national champions, to clinch a place in the Big Ten Tournament.

The Bruins finished the regular season 9–3–5 and 4–3–3 in Big Ten play. As the sixth seed in the Big Ten Tournament, they will face third seed Rutgers in the Quarterfinals in Seattle. Fifth-year forward Diego Castano leads the team with eight goals.

== Background ==
The Bruins finished the 2025 regular season 6–6–4 and 5–3–2 in Big Ten play. As the fourth seed in the Big Ten Tournament, they won the program's first Big Ten Tournament title, shutting out top seed Maryland in the Semifinals and Michigan in the Final. Sergi Solans Ormo was named the tournament's Most Outstanding Player. In the NCAA Tournament, they lost to Grand Canyon on penalties after a 0–0 draw in the First Round, finishing the season 8–6–5. Following the season, Tre Wright was selected 33rd overall by Real Salt Lake, Schinieder Mimy 38th by the New England Revolution and Tarun Karumanchi 49th by the Columbus Crew in the 2026 MLS SuperDraft. Wright returned to UCLA for the 2026 season.

== Player movement ==
=== Players leaving ===
Departures
Name	Number	Pos.	Height	Year	Hometown	Reason for Departure
Ian Charles	4	DF	6'0"	Freshman	McLean, Virginia	—
Drew Brown	5	DF	6'2"	Graduate Student	Waukee, Iowa	Graduated
Tarun Karumanchi	6	MF	5'11"	Senior	San Ramon, California	Selected 49th overall in the 2026 MLS SuperDraft
Sergi Solans Ormo	9	FW	6'1"	Redshirt Sophomore	Lleida, Spain	Signed with Real Salt Lake
Konstantinos Georgallides	10	MF	5'6"	Graduate Student	Famagusta, Cyprus	Signed in USL League One
Sean Sent	12	MF	6'0"	Graduate Student	Bellevue, Washington	Graduated
Kian Concepcion	13	DF	5'11"	Freshman	Austin, Texas	—
Zach Mastrodimos	14	MF	5'5"	Freshman	Hoboken, New Jersey	—
Sam Scott	17	FW	6'0"	Redshirt Sophomore	Frisco, Texas	—
Kevin Box	18	GK	6'0"	Graduate Student	Menlo Park, California	Graduated
Schinieder Mimy	23	DF	5'10"	Graduate Student	North Miami, Florida	Selected 38th overall in the 2026 MLS SuperDraft
Ethan Pendleton	24	DF	5'11"	Freshman	Washington, D.C.	—
Dylan Cantafio	25	MF	5'7"	Freshman	Orange, California	—
Bridger Baltes	26	FW	6'0"	Freshman	Santa Barbara, California	—
Artem Vovk	27	FW	5'9"	Sophomore	Rivne, Ukraine	—

=== Players arriving ===
==== Incoming transfers ====
Incoming transfers
Name	Number	Pos.	Height	Year	Hometown	Previous School
Victor Ciaurriz	4	DF	6'3"	Fifth Year	Pamplona, Spain	Universidad Pública de Navarra
Mathis Richter	5	DF	6'2"	Junior	Neuenkirchen, Germany	UAB
Diego Martinez	6	MF	6'2"	Fifth Year	Madrid, Spain	Rey Juan Carlos University
Jaime Amaro	10	MF	5'7"	Junior	Madrid, Spain	Bryant
David de la Vibora	11	DF	5'7"	Junior	Madrid, Spain	Marshall
Zach Neuls	12	MF	6'3"	Junior	Beaverton, Oregon	UC Davis
Albert Ruiz	13	MF	6'0"	Junior	Barcelona, Spain	University of Wales
David Diez	14	MF	6'0"	Fifth Year	Madrid, Spain	La Salle Centro Universitario
Finot Pie	17	FW	5'8"	Fifth Year	Barcelona, Spain	London Metropolitan University
Logan Hall	23	DF	6'0"	Sophomore	Fort Lauderdale, Florida	Jacksonville
Henry Jeffcott	24	DF	6'1"	Junior	London, England	Arsenal Academy
Diego Castano	25	FW	5'7"	Fifth Year	Benicàssim, Spain	Universidad Isabel I
Dylan Hooper	26	DF	6'0"	Fifth Year	Shawnee, Kansas	Stanford
Cameron Arnold	29	FW	5'11"	Fifth Year	Düsseldorf, Germany	James Madison

==== Recruiting class ====
Name	Nat.	Hometown	Club / High school
Tristan Shaw; GK	USA	Scottsdale, Arizona	Phoenix Rising FC
Marcus Jackson; DF	USA	West Orange, New Jersey	West Orange High School
James Lane; FW	USA	Culver City, California	Los Angeles FC Academy

== Squad ==
=== Roster ===
As of November 6, 2026

Note: Flags indicate national team as defined under FIFA eligibility rules; some limited exceptions apply. Players may hold more than one non-FIFA nationality.

No.	Pos.	Nation	Player
1	GK	USA	Wyatt Nelson
2	DF	USA	Shakir Nixon
3	DF	USA	Tre Wright
4	DF	ESP	Victor Ciaurriz
5	DF	GER	Mathis Richter
6	MF	ESP	Diego Martinez
7	MF	DEN	Philip Naef
8	MF	USA	Tamir Ratoviz
9	FW	DEN	Oliver Roche
10	MF	ESP	Jaime Amaro
11	DF	ESP	David de la Vibora
12	MF	USA	Zach Neuls
13	MF	ESP	Albert Ruiz
14	MF	ESP	David Diez
15	MF	USA	Allan Legaspi

No.	Pos.	Nation	Player
16	MF	USA	Sebastian Rincon
17	FW	ESP	Finot Pie
18	GK	USA	Tristan Shaw
19	DF	USA	Marcus Jackson
20	MF	ESP	Ander Marticorena
21	FW	GHA	Francis Bonsu
22	GK	CAN	Ryan Tiltack
23	DF	USA	Logan Hall
24	DF	NIR	Henry Jeffcott
25	FW	ESP	Diego Castano
26	DF	USA	Dylan Hooper
27	FW	USA	James Lane
28	MF	USA	Adrian Aguilar
29	FW	GER	Cameron Arnold
30	DF	USA	Blake Bayless

=== Team management ===
Position	Staff
Head coach	Ryan Jorden
Assistant coach	Sergi Nus
Assistant coach	Joey O'Keefe
Assistant coach	Kary Whitney

== Schedule ==
Date Time, TV	Rank^{#}	Opponent^{#}	Result	Record	Site (Attendance) City, State
Regular season
August 20*; 4:00 p.m.		at No. 11 Virginia	W 2–1	1–0–0	Klöckner Stadium (1,306); Charlottesville, VA
August 24*; 7:00 p.m.		CSU Bakersfield	T 1–1	1–0–1	Wallis Annenberg Stadium (476); Los Angeles, CA
August 28*; 7:00 p.m.	No. 17	Denver	W 3–0	2–0–1	Wallis Annenberg Stadium (464); Los Angeles, CA
September 1*; 5:00 p.m.	No. 12	at California	T 2–2	2–0–2	Edwards Stadium (433); Berkeley, CA
September 6*; 8:30 p.m.	No. 12	Omaha	W 2–1	3–0–2	Wallis Annenberg Stadium (307); Los Angeles, CA
September 11; 4:00 p.m.	No. 11	at Rutgers	L 1–3	3–1–2 (0–1–0)	Yurcak Field (367); Piscataway, NJ
September 18; 7:00 p.m.		Michigan	T 1–1	3–1–3 (0–1–1)	Wallis Annenberg Stadium (1,706); Los Angeles, CA
September 25; 4:00 p.m.		at No. 4 Maryland	T 2–2	3–1–4 (0–1–2)	Ludwig Field (5,389); College Park, MD
September 28; 4:00 p.m.		at Penn State	W 4–2	4–1–4 (1–1–2)	Jeffrey Field (934); University Park, PA
October 3; 6:00 p.m.		No. 8 Michigan State	W 3–0	5–1–4 (2–1–2)	Wallis Annenberg Stadium (891); Los Angeles, CA
October 6*; 7:00 p.m.	No. 21	Westmont	W 5–1	6–1–4	Wallis Annenberg Stadium (587); Los Angeles, CA
October 10; 6:00 p.m.	No. 21	Ohio State	W 2–1	7–1–4 (3–1–2)	Wallis Annenberg Stadium (809); Los Angeles, CA
October 16; 5:00 p.m.	No. 10	at No. 18 Wisconsin	L 3–4	7–2–4 (3–2–2)	McClimon Complex (923); Madison, WI
October 19; 4:00 p.m.	No. 10	at Northwestern	T 0–0	7–2–5 (3–2–3)	Martin Stadium (113); Evanston, IL
October 25*; 6:00 p.m.	No. 19	San Diego	W 3–1	8–2–5	Wallis Annenberg Stadium (729); Los Angeles, CA
October 30; 7:00 p.m.	No. 22	No. 4 Indiana	L 1–3	8–3–5 (3–3–3)	Wallis Annenberg Stadium (827); Los Angeles, CA
November 4; 5:00 p.m.	No. 25	No. 6 Washington	W 1–0	9–3–5 (4–3–3)	Wallis Annenberg Stadium (691); Los Angeles, CA
Big Ten Tournament
November 8*; 12:00 p.m., B1G+	(6) No. 25	vs. (3) No. 23 Rutgers; Quarterfinals			Husky Soccer Stadium; Seattle, WA
*Non-conference game. ^{#}Rankings from United Soccer Coaches. (#) Tournament seedings in parentheses. All times are in Pacific.

== Goals record ==
Through November 4, 2026.

Rank	No.	Nat.	Po.	Name	Regular season	Big Ten Tournament	NCAA Tournament	Total
1	25	(Spain)	FW	Diego Castano	8	0	0	8
2	10	(Spain)	MF	Jaime Amaro	6	0	0	6
3	2	(United States)	DF	Shakir Nixon	5	0	0	5
4	9	(Denmark)	FW	Oliver Roche	3	0	0	3
4	12	(United States)	MF	Zach Neuls	3	0	0	3
6	21	(Ghana)	FW	Francis Bonsu	2	0	0	2
7	4	(Spain)	DF	Victor Ciaurriz	1	0	0	1
7	5	(Germany)	DF	Mathis Richter	1	0	0	1
7	7	(Denmark)	MF	Philip Naef	1	0	0	1
7	8	(United States)	MF	Tamir Ratoviz	1	0	0	1
7	20	(Spain)	MF	Ander Marticorena	1	0	0	1
7	23	(United States)	DF	Logan Hall	1	0	0	1
7	27	(United States)	FW	James Lane	1	0	0	1
7	28	(United States)	MF	Adrian Aguilar	1	0	0	1
7	29	(Germany)	FW	Cameron Arnold	1	0	0	1
Total					36	0	0	36

== Disciplinary record ==
Through November 4, 2026.

Rank	No.	Nat.	Po.	Name	Regular Season			Big Ten Tournament			NCAA Tournament			Total		
Rank	No.	Nat.	Po.	Name	Yellow card	(yellow card) (yellow-red card)	Red card	Yellow card	(yellow card) (yellow-red card)	Red card	Yellow card	(yellow card) (yellow-red card)	Red card	Yellow card	(yellow card) (yellow-red card)	Red card
1	11	(Spain)	DF	David de la Vibora	4	0	0	0	0	0	0	0	0	4	0	0
1	24	(Northern Ireland)	DF	Henry Jeffcott	4	0	0	0	0	0	0	0	0	4	0	0
3	4	(Spain)	DF	Victor Ciaurriz	2	1	0	0	0	0	0	0	0	2	1	0
4	5	(Germany)	DF	Mathis Richter	3	0	0	0	0	0	0	0	0	3	0	0
4	20	(Spain)	MF	Ander Marticorena	3	0	0	0	0	0	0	0	0	3	0	0
6	6	(Spain)	MF	Diego Martinez	1	0	1	0	0	0	0	0	0	1	0	1
7	9	(Denmark)	FW	Oliver Roche	2	0	0	0	0	0	0	0	0	2	0	0
7	10	(Spain)	MF	Jaime Amaro	2	0	0	0	0	0	0	0	0	2	0	0
7	23	(United States)	DF	Logan Hall	2	0	0	0	0	0	0	0	0	2	0	0
7	29	(Germany)	FW	Cameron Arnold	2	0	0	0	0	0	0	0	0	2	0	0
11	7	(Denmark)	MF	Philip Naef	1	0	0	0	0	0	0	0	0	1	0	0
11	12	(United States)	MF	Zach Neuls	1	0	0	0	0	0	0	0	0	1	0	0
11	13	(Spain)	MF	Albert Ruiz	1	0	0	0	0	0	0	0	0	1	0	0
11	21	(Ghana)	FW	Francis Bonsu	1	0	0	0	0	0	0	0	0	1	0	0
11	22	(Canada)	GK	Ryan Tiltack	1	0	0	0	0	0	0	0	0	1	0	0
11	25	(Spain)	FW	Diego Castano	1	0	0	0	0	0	0	0	0	1	0	0
11	28	(United States)	MF	Adrian Aguilar	1	0	0	0	0	0	0	0	0	1	0	0
Total					32	1	1	0	0	0	0	0	0	32	1	1

== Awards and honors ==
Recipient	Award	Date	Ref.
Tre Wright	Big Ten Defensive Player of the Week	October 6	

== Rankings ==
Ranking movements Legend: ██ Increase in ranking ██ Decrease in ranking — = Not ranked RV = Received votes
	Week																
Poll	Pre	1	2	3	4	5	6	7	8	9	10	11	12	13	14	15	Final
United Soccer	—	17	12	11	RV	—	—	21	10	19	22	25		Not released			
TopDrawer Soccer	—	—	22	19	22	—	—	—	15	11	14	17	22				
College Soccer News	RV	25	18	18	23	RV	—	RV	23	19	20	20			Not released		
