= 2026 Michigan State Spartans men's soccer team =

American college soccer season

2026 Michigan State Spartans men's soccer
- Conference: Big Ten Conference
- U. Soc. Coaches poll: No. 16
- TopDrawerSoccer.com: No. 21
- Record: 10–4–3 (5–3–2 Big Ten)
- Head coach: Damon Rensing (18th season)
- Assistant coaches: Reid Friedrichs; Nick Barry; Zach Carroll
- Home stadium: DeMartin Stadium

2026 Big Ten Conference men's soccer standings
	Conf.						Overall
Team	W		L		T	PCT	W		L		T	PCT
No. 4 Indiana ‍†‍‍	7	–	1	–	2	.800	14	–	1	–	3	.861
No. 6 Washington ‍‍‍	6	–	2	–	2	.700	10	–	4	–	3	.676
No. 23 Rutgers ‍‍‍	6	–	3	–	1	.650	8	–	6	–	2	.563
No. 16 Michigan State ‍‍‍	5	–	3	–	2	.600	10	–	4	–	3	.676
No. 11 Maryland ‍‍‍	5	–	4	–	1	.550	11	–	4	–	1	.719
No. 25т UCLA ‍‍‍	4	–	3	–	3	.550	9	–	3	–	5	.676
No. 13 Wisconsin ‍‍‍	3	–	3	–	4	.500	10	–	3	–	4	.706
Northwestern ‍‍‍	3	–	4	–	3	.450	6	–	6	–	4	.500
Ohio State ‍‍‍	3	–	6	–	1	.350	8	–	6	–	2	.563
Michigan ‍‍‍	0	–	6	–	4	.200	3	–	8	–	5	.344
Penn State ‍‍‍	0	–	7	–	3	.150	3	–	9	–	3	.300
† – Conference champion ‡ – 2026 B1G tournament champion y – Invited to the 2026 NCAA Tournament; As of November 4, 2026; Rankings from United Soccer Coaches; Source: Big Ten

The 2026 Michigan State Spartans men's soccer team represents Michigan State University during the 2026 NCAA Division I men's soccer season. The Spartans are led by head coach Damon Rensing, in his eighteenth season, and play their home games at DeMartin Stadium in East Lansing, Michigan. They compete in the Big Ten Conference.

The Spartans began the season unranked and opened with a 6–2 win over UAlbany, their highest-scoring season opener since 2001. A 4–1 win over Niagara gave them a 4–0 start for the first time in nine years, and they were ranked for the first time in three years. After a 0–0 draw with Pittsburgh, they suffered their first loss 3–1 at Kansas City, then opened Big Ten play with a 2–0 win over Northwestern behind two goals from Andrew Darakdjian. Michigan State beat thirteenth-ranked Wisconsin 3–0 on an Alumni Night celebrating 70 years of the program, and won 2–1 at seventh-ranked Maryland, its first win over Maryland since 2018. A 1–1 draw with Michigan kept the Big Bear Trophy in East Lansing, and an 89th-minute goal from Richie Ludwig won a 3–2 match at Ohio State that put the Spartans alone in first place in the Big Ten. Ranked sixth, they drew 1–1 with seventh-ranked defending national champion Washington, and a 3–0 win over Green Bay gave them ten wins for the first time since 2018. A 4–1 home loss to Rutgers on Senior Night hurt their title hopes, and they closed the regular season with a 3–2 loss at fourth-ranked Indiana.

The Spartans finished the regular season 10–4–3 and 5–3–2 in Big Ten play. As the fourth seed in the Big Ten Tournament, they will face fifth seed Maryland in the Quarterfinals in Bloomington. Darakdjian leads the team with eight goals.

== Background ==
The Spartans finished the 2025 season 5–8–3 and 2–5–3 in Big Ten play. Their wins included a 1–0 home win over third-ranked Indiana and a 2–1 win at fifth-ranked Michigan.

== Player movement ==
=== Players leaving ===
Departures
Name	Number	Pos.	Height	Weight	Year	Hometown	Reason for Departure
Michael Sly	1	GK	6'0"	180	Redshirt Senior	Grand Blanc, Michigan	Graduated
Ryan Van De Winkle	4	DF	5'9"	177	Redshirt Junior	Macomb, Michigan	—
Chimnosoh Okeke	12	FW	5'9"	175	Freshman	Laval, Quebec	—
Josh Adam	14	DF	6'2"	172	Redshirt Senior	Brighton, Michigan	Graduated
Jack Guggemos	19	MF	5'11"	150	Senior	Okemos, Michigan	Graduated
Jake Spadafora	22	FW	5'11"	170	Senior	Northville, Michigan	Graduated
Josh Mason	26	DF	6'5"	190	Senior	South Lyon, Michigan	Graduated
Zac Kelly	30	GK	6'0"	190	Redshirt Senior	Holt, Michigan	Graduated

=== Players arriving ===
==== Incoming transfers ====
Incoming transfers
Name	Number	Pos.	Height	Weight	Year	Hometown	Previous School
Conner O'Keefe	4	DF	6'3"	—	Sophomore	West Seattle, Washington	Saint Francis
Leo Conneh	23	MF	5'7"	150	Senior	Anoka, Minnesota	—

==== Recruiting class ====
Name	Nat.	Hometown	Club / High school
Per Bredvei; DF	NOR	Sandefjord, Norway	Sandefjord
Dom Dono; MF	USA	Plymouth, Michigan	—
Ezra Horlings; GK	USA	South Lyon, Michigan	Detroit Catholic Central
Innocent Ngabo; DF	USA	Grand Rapids, Michigan	East Kentwood
Drew Rensing; MF	USA	East Lansing, Michigan	East Lansing

== Squad ==
=== Roster ===
As of November 6, 2026

Note: Flags indicate national team as defined under FIFA eligibility rules; some limited exceptions apply. Players may hold more than one non-FIFA nationality.

No.	Pos.	Nation	Player
1	GK	USA	Jake Grekowicz
2	DF	USA	Will Eby
3	MF	USA	Jared Smid
4	DF	USA	Conner O'Keefe
5	DF	USA	Brandon Munson
6	DF	USA	Charlie Norkett
7	DF	USA	Aidan Phelan
8	MF	USA	Miles Merritt
9	FW	USA	Andrew Darakdjian
10	FW	USA	Richie Ludwig
11	MF	USA	Luke Spadafora
13	DF	USA	Innocent Ngabo
14	MF	USA	Dom Dono
15	FW	USA	Oscar Huerta

No.	Pos.	Nation	Player
16	MF	USA	Colin Arce
17	MF	USA	Peter Soudan
18	MF	USA	Justin Cassell
19	DF	USA	Jeb Knox
20	FW	USA	Kayden Hudson
21	MF	USA	Thatcher Hogan
22	DF	NOR	Per Bredvei
23	MF	USA	Leo Conneh
24	FW	USA	Mohamed Saad
25	DF	USA	Jackson Lusky
27	MF	USA	Drew Rensing
30	GK	USA	Ezra Horlings
32	GK	USA	David Anderson

=== Team management ===
Position	Staff
Head coach	Damon Rensing
Assistant coach	Reid Friedrichs
Assistant coach	Nick Barry
Assistant coach	Zach Carroll

== Schedule ==
Date Time, TV	Rank^{#}	Opponent^{#}	Result	Record	Site (Attendance) City, State
Regular season
August 20*; 7:00 p.m.		UAlbany	W 6–2	1–0–0	DeMartin Stadium (1,205); East Lansing, MI
August 23*; 2:00 p.m.		Seattle U	W 2–1	2–0–0	DeMartin Stadium (1,190); East Lansing, MI
August 27*; 7:30 p.m.	No. 24	SIUE	W 4–0	3–0–0	DeMartin Stadium (2,927); East Lansing, MI
August 30*; 2:00 p.m.	No. 24	Niagara	W 4–1	4–0–0	DeMartin Stadium (2,056); East Lansing, MI
September 3*; 7:00 p.m.	No. 8	Pittsburgh	T 0–0	4–0–1	DeMartin Stadium (1,532); East Lansing, MI
September 11*; 8:00 p.m.	No. 10	at Kansas City	L 1–3	4–1–1	Durwood Stadium (675); Kansas City, MO
September 15; 7:00 p.m.	No. 19	Northwestern	W 2–0	5–1–1 (1–0–0)	DeMartin Stadium (1,087); East Lansing, MI
September 18; 7:00 p.m.	No. 19	at Penn State	W 1–0	6–1–1 (2–0–0)	Jeffrey Field (1,187); University Park, PA
September 25; 7:00 p.m.	No. 11	No. 13 Wisconsin	W 3–0	7–1–1 (3–0–0)	DeMartin Stadium (2,121); East Lansing, MI
October 3; 9:00 p.m.	No. 8	at UCLA	L 0–3	7–2–1 (3–1–0)	Wallis Annenberg Stadium (891); Los Angeles, CA
October 9; 7:30 p.m.	No. 19	at No. 7 Maryland	W 2–1	8–2–1 (4–1–0)	Ludwig Field (3,569); College Park, MD
October 13; 7:00 p.m.	No. 12	Michigan; Big Bear Trophy	T 1–1	8–2–2 (4–1–1)	DeMartin Stadium (3,306); East Lansing, MI
October 16; 7:00 p.m.	No. 12	at Ohio State	W 3–2	9–2–2 (5–1–1)	Jesse Owens Memorial Stadium (1,112); Columbus, OH
October 23; 7:00 p.m.	No. 6	No. 7 Washington	T 1–1	9–2–3 (5–1–2)	DeMartin Stadium (1,154); East Lansing, MI
October 27*; 6:00 p.m.	No. 8	Green Bay	W 3–0	10–2–3	DeMartin Stadium (1,736); East Lansing, MI
October 30; 7:00 p.m.	No. 8	Rutgers	L 1–4	10–3–3 (5–2–2)	DeMartin Stadium (1,323); East Lansing, MI
November 4; 8:00 p.m.	No. 16	at No. 4 Indiana	L 2–3	10–4–3 (5–3–2)	Bill Armstrong Stadium (3,178); Bloomington, IN
Big Ten Tournament
November 8*; 1:00 p.m.	(4) No. 16	vs. (5) No. 11 Maryland; Quarterfinals			Bill Armstrong Stadium; Bloomington, IN
*Non-conference game. ^{#}Rankings from United Soccer Coaches. (#) Tournament seedings in parentheses. All times are in Eastern.

== Goals record ==
Through November 4, 2026.

Rank	No.	Nat.	Po.	Name	Regular season	Big Ten Tournament	NCAA Tournament	Total
1	9	(United States)	FW	Andrew Darakdjian	8	0	0	8
2	10	(United States)	FW	Richie Ludwig	4	0	0	4
2	15	(United States)	FW	Oscar Huerta	4	0	0	4
2	23	(United States)	MF	Leo Conneh	4	0	0	4
5	4	(United States)	DF	Conner O'Keefe	3	0	0	3
5	11	(United States)	MF	Luke Spadafora	3	0	0	3
7	5	(United States)	DF	Brandon Munson	2	0	0	2
7	8	(United States)	MF	Miles Merritt	2	0	0	2
7	17	(United States)	MF	Peter Soudan	2	0	0	2
10	13	(United States)	DF	Innocent Ngabo	1	0	0	1
10	14	(United States)	MF	Dom Dono	1	0	0	1
10	20	(United States)	FW	Kayden Hudson	1	0	0	1
Own goals					1	0	0	1
Total					36	0	0	36

== Disciplinary record ==
Through November 4, 2026.

Rank	No.	Nat.	Po.	Name	Regular Season			Big Ten Tournament			NCAA Tournament			Total		
Rank	No.	Nat.	Po.	Name	Yellow card	(yellow card) (yellow-red card)	Red card	Yellow card	(yellow card) (yellow-red card)	Red card	Yellow card	(yellow card) (yellow-red card)	Red card	Yellow card	(yellow card) (yellow-red card)	Red card
1	5	(United States)	DF	Brandon Munson	6	0	0	0	0	0	0	0	0	6	0	0
2	11	(United States)	MF	Luke Spadafora	4	0	0	0	0	0	0	0	0	4	0	0
3	10	(United States)	FW	Richie Ludwig	3	0	0	0	0	0	0	0	0	3	0	0
3	16	(United States)	MF	Colin Arce	3	0	0	0	0	0	0	0	0	3	0	0
5	2	(United States)	DF	Will Eby	2	0	0	0	0	0	0	0	0	2	0	0
5	4	(United States)	DF	Conner O'Keefe	2	0	0	0	0	0	0	0	0	2	0	0
5	6	(United States)	DF	Charlie Norkett	2	0	0	0	0	0	0	0	0	2	0	0
5	8	(United States)	MF	Miles Merritt	2	0	0	0	0	0	0	0	0	2	0	0
5	23	(United States)	MF	Leo Conneh	2	0	0	0	0	0	0	0	0	2	0	0
5	27	(United States)	MF	Drew Rensing	2	0	0	0	0	0	0	0	0	2	0	0
11	9	(United States)	FW	Andrew Darakdjian	1	0	0	0	0	0	0	0	0	1	0	0
11	13	(United States)	DF	Innocent Ngabo	1	0	0	0	0	0	0	0	0	1	0	0
11	15	(United States)	FW	Oscar Huerta	1	0	0	0	0	0	0	0	0	1	0	0
Total					31	0	0	0	0	0	0	0	0	31	0	0

== Rankings ==
Ranking movements Legend: ██ Increase in ranking ██ Decrease in ranking — = Not ranked RV = Received votes
	Week																
Poll	Pre	1	2	3	4	5	6	7	8	9	10	11	12	13	14	15	Final
United Soccer	—	24	8	10	19	11	8	19	12	6	8	16		Not released			
TopDrawer Soccer	—	—	—	—	25	—	19	7	19	15	15	12	21				
College Soccer News	—	—	RV	19	20	18	11	12	11	6	6	9			Not released		
