= 2026 Maryland Terrapins men's soccer team =

American college soccer season

2026 Maryland Terrapins men's soccer
- Conference: Big Ten Conference
- U. Soc. Coaches poll: No. 11
- TopDrawerSoccer.com: No. 11
- Record: 11–4–1 (5–4–1 Big Ten)
- Head coach: Sasho Cirovski (34th season)
- Assistant coaches: Brian Rowland; Steve Armas (1st season); Michael Gould
- Home stadium: Ludwig Field

2026 Big Ten Conference men's soccer standings
	Conf.						Overall
Team	W		L		T	PCT	W		L		T	PCT
No. 4 Indiana ‍†‍‍	7	–	1	–	2	.800	14	–	1	–	3	.861
No. 6 Washington ‍‍‍	6	–	2	–	2	.700	10	–	4	–	3	.676
No. 23 Rutgers ‍‍‍	6	–	3	–	1	.650	8	–	6	–	2	.563
No. 16 Michigan State ‍‍‍	5	–	3	–	2	.600	10	–	4	–	3	.676
No. 11 Maryland ‍‍‍	5	–	4	–	1	.550	11	–	4	–	1	.719
No. 25т UCLA ‍‍‍	4	–	3	–	3	.550	9	–	3	–	5	.676
No. 13 Wisconsin ‍‍‍	3	–	3	–	4	.500	10	–	3	–	4	.706
Northwestern ‍‍‍	3	–	4	–	3	.450	6	–	6	–	4	.500
Ohio State ‍‍‍	3	–	6	–	1	.350	8	–	6	–	2	.563
Michigan ‍‍‍	0	–	6	–	4	.200	3	–	8	–	5	.344
Penn State ‍‍‍	0	–	7	–	3	.150	3	–	9	–	3	.300
† – Conference champion ‡ – 2026 B1G tournament champion y – Invited to the 2026 NCAA Tournament; As of November 4, 2026; Rankings from United Soccer Coaches; Source: Big Ten

The 2026 Maryland Terrapins men's soccer team represents the University of Maryland during the 2026 NCAA Division I men's soccer season. The Terrapins are led by head coach Sasho Cirovski, in his thirty-fourth season. They play their home games at Ludwig Field in College Park, Maryland. This is the team's 81st season playing organized men's college soccer and their 13th playing in the Big Ten Conference.

Coming off a 2025 season in which they went unbeaten in the regular season and reached the NCAA Tournament quarterfinals, the Terrapins lost most of their key players to graduation, the transfer portal and the MLS SuperDraft. They began the season ranked seventh and opened with five straight wins, including a 1–0 win over ninth-ranked High Point on a late goal from freshman Rodrigo Neri and a 3–2 win over fifth-ranked Georgetown in front of Ludwig Field's largest crowd since 2017; it was the program's first 5–0 start since 2011. Ranked second in the nation, Maryland lost its Big Ten opener 4–0 at Northwestern, ending a 20-match regular-season unbeaten streak. The Terrapins beat seventh-ranked Wisconsin 1–0 but went 2–2–1 over their next five conference matches, with a loss at second-ranked Indiana and their first home loss of the season, 2–1 to nineteenth-ranked Michigan State. After back-to-back shutout wins over St. John's and Ohio State, Maryland lost 2–1 at seventh-ranked Washington, the team that had eliminated it from the previous year's NCAA Tournament.

The Terrapins finished the regular season 11–4–1 and 5–4–1 in Big Ten play to finish in fifth place. As the fifth seed in the Big Ten Tournament, they will face fourth seed Michigan State in the Quarterfinals in Bloomington, Indiana. Rodrigo Neri leads the team with eight goals.

== Previous season ==
The Terrapins finished the 2025 regular season 12–0–3 and 8–0–2 in Big Ten play, winning the conference regular-season title. In the Big Ten Tournament, they lost 2–0 to UCLA in the Semifinals. In the NCAA Tournament, Maryland advanced past North Carolina on penalty kicks and beat UConn 3–0 before losing 3–1 to Washington in the Quarterfinals, finishing the season 13–2–4. Following the season, Sadam Masereka, Colin Griffith, Stephane Njike and Lasse Kelp were selected in the 2026 MLS SuperDraft.

== Player movement ==
=== Players leaving ===
Departures
Name	Number	Pos.	Height	Weight	Year	Hometown	Reason for Departure
Saxon Wolcott	0	GK	6'3"	180	Junior	Bethesda, Maryland	—
Luca Costabile	3	DF	5'11"	165	Senior	Copenhagen, Denmark	Signed with Toronto FC II
Mack DeVries	4	DF	6'1"	200	Senior	Mechanicsburg, Pennsylvania	Graduated
Lasse Kelp	5	DF	6'3"	185	Senior	Bonn, Germany	Selected 85th overall in the 2026 MLS SuperDraft by D.C. United
Sadam Masereka	7	FW	5'9"	150	Senior	Kampala, Uganda	Selected 34th overall in the 2026 MLS SuperDraft by Sporting Kansas City
Colin Griffith	9	FW	5'10"	160	Senior	Stroudsburg, Pennsylvania	Selected 45th overall in the 2026 MLS SuperDraft by the Portland Timbers
Joseph Umberto Picotto	10	MF	6'2"	180	Senior	Pinerolo, Italy	Graduated
Mateo Caride	11	FW	6'0"	176	Freshman	Buenos Aires, Argentina	Transferred to Coastal Carolina
Max Riley	12	FW	6'0"	190	Senior	Macclesfield, England	Graduated
Joel Brown	13	DF	5'10"	165	Senior	Baltimore, Maryland	Graduated
Jameson Michel	15	FW	5'10"	145	Sophomore	Columbia, Maryland	—
Chris Steinleitner	22	MF	6'2"	175	Senior	Munich, Germany	Graduated
Brian St. Martin	28	DF	6'0"	170	Senior	Mount Airy, Maryland	Graduated
Matias De Jesus	30	MF	5'11"	170	Senior	Towson, Maryland	Transferred to George Mason
Tristen Rose	31	DF	6'2"	185	Senior	Cortland, Ohio	Graduated
Luke van Heukelum	44	FW	6'1"	170	Junior	Elmhurst, Illinois	Transferred to Wisconsin
Aidan Sheppela	49	FW	5'11"	160	Sophomore	Brentwood, New Hampshire	—
Stephane Njike	77	FW	5'11"	165	Sophomore	Paris, France	Selected 61st overall in the 2026 MLS SuperDraft by D.C. United; transferred to Indiana

=== Players arriving ===
==== Incoming transfers ====
Incoming transfers
Name	Number	Pos.	Height	Weight	Year	Hometown	Previous School
Nikolaj Bertelsen	1	GK	6'2"	195	Junior	Vejle, Denmark	Emory & Henry
Lilian Fichelle	3	DF	5'11"	175	Junior	Attiches, France	Campbell
Ljubomir Popovic	5	DF	6'2"	180	Junior	Wolfurt, Austria	Tyler Junior College
Dominic Ayella	10	FW	5'8"	150	Junior	Gulu, Uganda	Lindsey Wilson
Zack Harris	16	MF	6'0"	145	Senior	Agoura Hills, California	CSUN
Marco Wright	19	FW	6'0"	170	Senior	Gastonia, North Carolina	Campbell

==== Recruiting class ====
Name	Nat.	Hometown	Previous club / school
Jason Atakora; MF	GHA	Ashanti, Ghana	Exulted FC
Antoine Coupland; FW	CAN	Chelsea, Quebec	Vancouver Whitecaps 2
Rodrigo Neri; FW	ESP	Madrid, Spain	Atlético Madrid
Maxwell Sekyi; DF	GHA	Accra, Ghana	Exulted FC
Luka Juricic; MF	CAN	Georgetown, Ontario	—
Dennis Kalanzi; FW	UGA	Kampala, Uganda	Police FC
Noah Gassan; MF	USA	Miami, Florida	Western HS
Zach Cielewich; GK	USA	Severna Park, Maryland	D.C. United Academy
Franklin Affanyi; DF	GHA	Accra-Nungua, Ghana	Montverde Academy
Said El Eyssami; FW	VEN	Mérida, Venezuela	Northwood Prep

== Squad ==
=== Roster ===
As of November 6, 2026

Note: Flags indicate national team as defined under FIFA eligibility rules; some limited exceptions apply. Players may hold more than one non-FIFA nationality.

No.	Pos.	Nation	Player
1	GK	DEN	Nikolaj Bertelsen
2	MF	USA	Luke Burdett
3	DF	FRA	Lilian Fichelle
4	MF	GHA	Jason Atakora
5	DF	AUT	Ljubomir Popovic
6	MF	GER	Leon Koehl
7	FW	CAN	Antoine Coupland
8	FW	USA	Albi Ndrenika
9	FW	ESP	Rodrigo Neri
10	FW	UGA	Dominic Ayella
11	FW	USA	Rocket Ritarita
14	DF	GHA	Maxwell Sekyi
16	MF	USA	Zack Harris
17	MF	USA	Kenny Quist-Therson

No.	Pos.	Nation	Player
18	DF	USA	Jace Clark
19	FW	USA	Marco Wright
20	DF	USA	Casey Price
23	MF	CAN	Luka Juricic
25	FW	UGA	Dennis Kalanzi
27	MF	USA	Henry Bernstein
30	MF	USA	Noah Gassan
33	GK	USA	Zach Cielewich
38	GK	GER	Laurin Mack
50	GK	CAN	Alexander Milosevic
55	DF	DEN	Emil Nymann Anderson
88	DF	GHA	Franklin Affanyi
90	DF	GER	Farouk Cisse
99	FW	VEN	Said El Eyssami

=== Team management ===
Position	Staff
Head coach	(Canada) Sasho Cirovski
Associate head coach	(United States) Brian Rowland
Associate head coach	(United States) Steve Armas
Assistant coach	Michael Gould

== Schedule ==
Date Time, TV	Rank^{#}	Opponent^{#}	Result	Record	Site (Attendance) City, State
Regular season
August 20*; 7:00 p.m., ACCNX	No. 7	at Pittsburgh	W 2–1	1–0–0	Ambrose Urbanic Field (1,074); Pittsburgh, PA
August 24*; 7:00 p.m., B1G+	No. 7	New Haven	W 3–2	2–0–0	Ludwig Field (1,258); College Park, MD
August 29*; 7:00 p.m., B1G+	No. 4	No. 9 High Point	W 1–0	3–0–0	Ludwig Field (5,123); College Park, MD
September 4*; 7:30 p.m., B1G+	No. 2	Delaware	W 4–3	4–0–0	Ludwig Field (2,835); College Park, MD
September 7*; 7:00 p.m., BTN	No. 2	No. 5 Georgetown	W 3–2	5–0–0	Ludwig Field (6,110); College Park, MD
September 11; 7:30 p.m., B1G+	No. 2	at Northwestern	L 0–4	5–1–0 (0–1–0)	Martin Stadium (462); Evanston, IL
September 18; 8:00 p.m., B1G+	No. 8	No. 7 Wisconsin	W 1–0	6–1–0 (1–1–0)	Ludwig Field (5,107); College Park, MD
September 25; 7:00 p.m., B1G+	No. 4	UCLA	T 2–2	6–1–1 (1–1–1)	Ludwig Field (5,389); College Park, MD
October 2; 7:00 p.m., BTN	No. 6	at No. 2 Indiana	L 1–3	6–2–1 (1–2–1)	Bill Armstrong Stadium (3,588); Bloomington, IN
October 6; 6:00 p.m., BTN	No. 7	at Rutgers	W 2–1	7–2–1 (2–2–1)	Yurcak Field (614); Piscataway, NJ
October 9; 7:30 p.m., B1G+	No. 7	No. 19 Michigan State	L 1–2	7–3–1 (2–3–1)	Ludwig Field (3,569); College Park, MD
October 16; 7:00 p.m., BTN	No. 14	at Michigan	W 3–2	8–3–1 (3–3–1)	U-M Soccer Stadium (1,457); Ann Arbor, MI
October 20*; 7:00 p.m., B1G+	No. 11	St. John's	W 1–0	9–3–1	Ludwig Field (1,476); College Park, MD
October 24; 7:00 p.m., B1G+	No. 11	Ohio State	W 1–0	10–3–1 (4–3–1)	Ludwig Field (4,082); College Park, MD
October 30; 8:00 p.m., BTN	No. 11	at No. 7 Washington	L 1–2	10–4–1 (4–4–1)	Husky Soccer Stadium (1,412); Seattle, WA
November 4; 8:00 p.m., B1G+	No. 11	Penn State	W 2–0	11–4–1 (5–4–1)	Ludwig Field (2,853); College Park, MD
Big Ten Tournament
November 8*; 1:00 p.m., B1G+	(5) No. 11	vs. (4) No. 16 Michigan State; Quarterfinals			Bill Armstrong Stadium; Bloomington, IN
*Non-conference game. ^{#}Rankings from United Soccer Coaches. (#) Tournament seedings in parentheses. All times are in Eastern.

== Goals record ==
Through November 4, 2026.

Rank	No.	Nat.	Po.	Name	Regular season	Big Ten Tournament	NCAA Tournament	Total
1	9	(Spain)	FW	Rodrigo Neri	8	0	0	8
2	99	(Venezuela)	FW	Said El Eyssami	5	0	0	5
3	8	(United States)	FW	Albi Ndrenika	4	0	0	4
4	10	(Uganda)	FW	Dominic Ayella	3	0	0	3
5	27	(United States)	MF	Henry Bernstein	2	0	0	2
6	5	(Austria)	DF	Ljubomir Popovic	1	0	0	1
6	6	(Germany)	MF	Leon Koehl	1	0	0	1
6	16	(United States)	MF	Zack Harris	1	0	0	1
6	25	(Uganda)	FW	Dennis Kalanzi	1	0	0	1
6	90	(Germany)	DF	Farouk Cisse	1	0	0	1
Own goals					1	0	0	1
Total					28	0	0	28

== Disciplinary record ==
Through November 4, 2026. Does not include two cautions issued to the Maryland bench.

Rank	No.	Nat.	Po.	Name	Regular Season			Big Ten Tournament			NCAA Tournament			Total		
Rank	No.	Nat.	Po.	Name	Yellow card	(yellow card) (yellow-red card)	Red card	Yellow card	(yellow card) (yellow-red card)	Red card	Yellow card	(yellow card) (yellow-red card)	Red card	Yellow card	(yellow card) (yellow-red card)	Red card
1	3	(France)	DF	Lilian Fichelle	3	0	0	0	0	0	0	0	0	3	0	0
2	8	(United States)	FW	Albi Ndrenika	2	0	0	0	0	0	0	0	0	2	0	0
2	9	(Spain)	FW	Rodrigo Neri	2	0	0	0	0	0	0	0	0	2	0	0
2	88	(Ghana)	DF	Franklin Affanyi	2	0	0	0	0	0	0	0	0	2	0	0
2	99	(Venezuela)	FW	Said El Eyssami	2	0	0	0	0	0	0	0	0	2	0	0
6	5	(Austria)	DF	Ljubomir Popovic	0	0	1	0	0	0	0	0	0	0	0	1
7	6	(Germany)	MF	Leon Koehl	1	0	0	0	0	0	0	0	0	1	0	0
7	10	(Uganda)	FW	Dominic Ayella	1	0	0	0	0	0	0	0	0	1	0	0
7	14	(Ghana)	DF	Maxwell Sekyi	1	0	0	0	0	0	0	0	0	1	0	0
7	16	(United States)	MF	Zack Harris	1	0	0	0	0	0	0	0	0	1	0	0
7	17	(United States)	MF	Kenny Quist-Therson	1	0	0	0	0	0	0	0	0	1	0	0
7	20	(United States)	DF	Casey Price	1	0	0	0	0	0	0	0	0	1	0	0
7	23	(Canada)	MF	Luka Juricic	1	0	0	0	0	0	0	0	0	1	0	0
7	27	(United States)	MF	Henry Bernstein	1	0	0	0	0	0	0	0	0	1	0	0
7	90	(Germany)	DF	Farouk Cisse	1	0	0	0	0	0	0	0	0	1	0	0
Total					20	0	1	0	0	0	0	0	0	20	0	1

== Awards and honors ==
Recipient	Award	Date	Ref.
Laurin Mack	United Soccer Coaches Goalkeepers to Watch	July 31	
Leon Koehl	United Soccer Coaches Midfielders to Watch	August 7	
Marco Wright	United Soccer Coaches Midfielders to Watch	August 7	
Leon Koehl	Big Ten Players to Watch	August 18	
Laurin Mack	Big Ten Players to Watch	August 18	
Albi Ndrenika	Big Ten Players to Watch	August 18	
Laurin Mack	MAC Hermann Trophy Preseason Watch List	August 19	
Said El Eyssami	Big Ten Freshman of the Week	August 25	
Laurin Mack	Big Ten Goalkeeper of the Week	September 1	
Rodrigo Neri	Big Ten Freshman of the Week	September 1	
Albi Ndrenika	Big Ten Offensive Player of the Week	September 8	
Rodrigo Neri	Big Ten Freshman of the Week	September 8	
Said El Eyssami	Big Ten Freshman of the Week	September 22	
Laurin Mack	Big Ten Goalkeeper of the Week	October 27	

== Rankings ==
Ranking movements Legend: ██ Increase in ranking ██ Decrease in ranking
	Week																
Poll	Pre	1	2	3	4	5	6	7	8	9	10	11	12	13	14	15	Final
United Soccer	7	4	2	2	8	4	6	7	14	11	11	11		Not released			
TopDrawer Soccer	7	7	4	2	2	12	7	12	12	18	16	10	11				
College Soccer News	4	2	2	2	5	6	4	6	9	7	8	7			Not released		
