= 2026 NCAA Division I men's soccer rankings =

- Season: 2026
- NCAA tournament: 2026
- Preseason No. 1: Washington
NCAA Division I men's soccer rankings
← 2025

Three major human polls make up the 2026 NCAA Division I men's soccer rankings: United Soccer Coaches, Top Drawer Soccer, and College Soccer News.

== Legend ==
	Increase in ranking
	Decrease in ranking
	New to rankings from previous week
Italics	Number of first place votes
(#–#)	Win-loss record
т	Tied with team above or below also with this symbol

== United Soccer Coaches ==
	Preseason Aug 4	Week 1 Aug 25	Week 2 Sep 1	Week 3 Sep 8	Week 4 Sep 15	Week 5 Sep 22	Week 6 Sep 29	Week 7 Oct 6	Week 8 Oct 13	Week 9 Oct 20	Week 10 Oct 27	Week 11 Nov 3	Week 12 Nov 10	Final	
1.	Washington (6)	Stanford (2–0–0) (8)	Stanford (4–0–0) (6)	Stanford (5–0–0) (8)	Stanford (6–0–1) (8)	South Carolina (7–0–0) (8)	SMU (8–0–1) (7)	SMU (9–0–1) (8)	SMU (10–0–1) (8)	SMU (10–0–2) (8)	SMU (12–0–2) (8)	Georgetown (14–1–1) (8)	SMU (13–0–3) (8)		1.
2.	NC State	San Diego (2–0–0)	Maryland (3–0–0) (1)	Maryland (4–0–0)	Indiana (6–0–1)	Indiana (7–0–1)	Indiana (8–0–2) (1)	Indiana (9–0–2)	Indiana (11–0–2)	Georgetown (11–1–1)	Georgetown (13–1–1)	SMU (12–0–3)	Georgetown (14–1–2)		2.
3.	Furman (1)	Portland (0–0–1)	SMU (4–0–0)	Ohio State (4–0–0)	Ohio State (5–0–1)	SMU (7–0–1)	Georgetown (8–1–1)	Georgetown (9–1–1)	Georgetown (10–1–1)	Clemson (11–2–1)	Clemson (11–2–2)	Clemson (12–2–2)	Indiana (14–1–3)		3.
4.	Saint Louis (1)	Maryland (1–0–0)	Ohio State (3–0–0)	Georgetown (4–0–1)	South Carolina (6–0–0)	Maryland (6–1–0)	Creighton (9–0–2)	Kansas City (7–1–2)	Clemson (10–2–1)	Indiana (11–1–2)	Indiana (12–1–3)	Indiana (13–1–3)	Akron (11–1–4)		4.
5.	Georgetown	SMU (1–0–0)	Georgetown (3–0–1) (1)	Indiana (4–0–1)	SMU (6–0–1)	Georgetown (6–1–1)	Kansas City (6–1–2)	Clemson (9–2–0)	Creighton (10–0–4)	Kansas City (9–2–2)	Kansas City (11–2–2)	Akron (10–1–4)	Clemson (13–3–2)		5.
6.	Portland	Georgetown (1–0–1)	Indiana (3–0–1)	South Carolina (4–0–0)	Akron (4–0–1)	Stanford (7–1–1)	Maryland (6–1–1)	Creighton (10–0–3)	South Carolina (8–1–2)	Michigan State (9–2–2)	Akron (9–1–4)	Washington (10–3–3)	Portland (11–3–2)		6.
7.	Maryland	Vermont (2–0–0)	San Diego (2–1–0)	SMU (4–0–1)	Wisconsin (5–0–1)	Creighton (7–0–2)	Missouri State (7–0–1)	Maryland (6–2–1)	Pittsburgh (7–2–2)	Washington (8–3–2)	Washington (8–3–3)	Portland (10–3–2)	West Virginia (11–2–4)		7.
8.	Princeton	Saint Louis (1–0–0)	Michigan State (4–0–0)	Wisconsin (5–0–0)	Maryland (5–1–0)	Kansas City (5–1–2)	Michigan State (7–1–1)	Missouri State (8–0–2)	Louisville (10–1–2)	Creighton (10–0–5)	Michigan State (9–2–3)	Louisville (12–2–3)	Creighton (12–1–5)		8.
9.	Stanford	High Point (1–0–0)	Akron (2–0–1)	San Diego (3–1–1)	Georgetown (5–1–1)	Missouri State (6–0–1)	Clemson (7–2–0)	South Carolina (7–1–2)	Akron (7–1–3)	Akron (7–1–4)	Creighton (11–0–5)	West Virginia (9–2–4)	Maryland (12–4–1)		9.
10.	Bryant	Akron (1–0–0)	Oregon State (2–0–1)	Michigan State (4–0–1)	San Diego (5–1–1)	Notre Dame (5–1–2)	Pittsburgh (6–2–1)	Pittsburgh (6–2–2)	UCLA (7–1–4)	Louisville (10–2–2)	Louisville (12–2–2)	Creighton (11–1–5)	Marshall (11–2–4)		10.
11.	Virginia	Washington (1–1–0)	Vermont (2–0–1)	UCLA (3–0–2)	Princeton (4–0–1)	Michigan State (6–1–1)	South Carolina (7–1–1)	Louisville (8–1–2)	Kansas City (8–2–2)	Maryland (8–3–1)	Maryland (10–3–1)	Maryland (10–4–1)	Washington (10–4–3)		11.
12.	Akron	Marshall (1–0–0)	UCLA (2–0–1)	Creighton (4–0–1)	Missouri State (5–0–0)	Ohio State (5–1–1)	Vermont (6–1–2)	Akron (6–1–2)	Michigan State (8–2–1)	Vermont (9–1–3)	Portland (9–3–2)	Kansas City (11–3–2)	North Carolina (9–2–6)		12.
13.	Vermont	Hofstra (2–0–0)	South Carolina (3–0–0)	Vermont (4–0–1)	Old Dominion (7–0–0)	Wisconsin (5–1–1)	Notre Dame (5–2–2)	Stanford (8–2–1)	Washington (7–3–2)	Wisconsin (8–2–3)	West Virginia (8–2–4)	Wisconsin (10–2–4)	Louisville (12–3–3)		13.
14.	UNC Greensboro	Indiana (2–0–0)	High Point (2–1–0)	Akron (2–0–1)	Creighton (6–0–2)	Clemson (6–2–0)	Stanford (7–2–1)	Washington (6–3–2)	Maryland (7–3–1)	Xavier (8–0–4)	Cornell (10–3–0)	Marshall (9–2–4)	Kansas City (11–3–2)		14.
15.	SMU	Kansas City (1–0–0)	Marshall (1–0–1)	Hofstra (4–0–1)	Louisville (6–0–1)	Old Dominion (7–1–0)	Washington (6–3–1)	West Virginia (5–1–3)	Charlotte (7–1–3)	Wake Forest (10–3–1)	North Carolina (7–2–4)	Wake Forest (11–4–2)	Rutgers (9–6–2)		15.
16.	High Point	Clemson (2–0–0)	Hofstra (2–0–1)	Princeton (3–0–1)	Kansas City (4–1–1)	Louisville (6–0–2)	West Virginia (5–1–2)	Vermont (7–1–3)	Vermont (8–1–3)	North Carolina (7–2–3)	Wake Forest (11–3–2)	Michigan State (10–3–3)	Missouri State (12–1–3)		16.
17.	Marshall	UCLA (1–0–0)	Wisconsin (3–0–0)	Clemson (4–1–0)	Cornell (2–1–0)	Akron (4–0–2)	Louisville (7–1–2)	Charlotte (5–1–3)	Missouri State (9–1–2)	Pittsburgh (8–3–2)	Xavier (9–1–4)	North Carolina (8–2–5)	Cornell (11–3–1)		17.
18.	San Diego	Charlotte (1–0–0)	Clemson (2–1–0)	Cornell (2–0–0)	Vermont (4–0–2)	Princeton (5–1–1)	Akron (5–1–2)	Xavier (7–0–2)	Wisconsin (7–2–3)	South Carolina (9–2–2)	Pittsburgh (9–4–2)	UNC Wilmington (11–2–2)	UCLA (9–4–5)		18.
19.	Oregon State	Duke (2–0–0)	Florida Atlantic (2–0–2)	Missouri State (4–0–0)	Michigan State (4–1–1)	San Diego (5–2–1)	Wisconsin (5–2–2)	Michigan State (7–2–1)	Cornell (7–2–0)	UCLA (7–2–4)	Wisconsin (9–2–4)	Missouri State (12–1–3)	San Diego (10–4–3)		19.
20.	Hofstra	NC State (1–0–1)	Cornell (1–0–0)	Marshall (2–0–2)	Notre Dame (3–1–2)	Pittsburgh (5–2–1)	UNC Wilmington (7–1–1)	Wisconsin (5–2–3)	UNC Wilmington (9–2–1)	Charlotte (7–1–4)	UNC Wilmington (10–2–2)	Pittsburgh (9–4–3)	Wake Forest (11–5–3)		20.
21.	Grand Canyon	UNC Greensboro (1–0–1)	UC Santa Barbara (1–0–1)	Louisville (4–0–1)	Clemson (4–2–0)	West Virginia (4–1–1)	Oregon State (4–1–3)	UCLA (5–1–4)	Xavier (8–0–3)	Portland (7–3–2)т	Marshall (8–2–4)	Cornell (10–3–1)	Pittsburgh (9–4–4)		21.
22.	Indiana	Ohio State (1–0–0)	Louisville (3–0–0)	Old Dominion (5–0–0)	Utah Valley (4–0–1)	Rutgers (4–3–1)	San Diego (5–2–2)	Cornell (6–2–0)	Oregon State (7–1–4)	Oregon State (7–3–4)т	UCLA (8–2–5)	Bryant (11–2–3)	Michigan State (10–5–3)		22.
23.	West Virginia	Wisconsin (2–0–0)	Creighton (2–0–1)т	Oregon State (2–1–1)т	UNC Wilmington (4–0–1)	Vermont (5–1–2)	Old Dominion (8–2–0)	UNC Wilmington (7–2–1)	Wake Forest (8–3–1)	Cornell (8–3–0)	Vermont (9–2–3)т	Rutgers (8–6–2)	UNC Wilmington (11–3–2)		23.
24.	UConn	Michigan State (2–0–0)	Princeton (1–0–1)т	UC Santa Barbara (1–1–2)т	Bryant (4–0–2)	Utah Valley (4–0–1)	Charlotte (4–1–3)	Albany (6–2–1)	West Virginia (5–2–4)	UNC Wilmington (9–2–2)	South Carolina (10–3–2)т	South Carolina (10–4–2)	Wisconsin (10–2–4)т		24.
25.	Kansas City	Oregon State (1–0–1)	Charlotte (1–0–2)	High Point (2–1–1)т	UC Santa Barbara (3–1–2)	Bryant (5–1–2)	Xavier (6–0–2)	San Diego (6–2–3)т; Syracuse (7–3–1)т	Stanford (8–3–1)	West Virginia (6–2–4)	Bryant (10–2–3)	UCLA (8–3–5)т; San Diego (9–4–3)т	Oregon State (10–4–4)т		25.
	Preseason Aug 4	Week 1 Aug 25	Week 2 Sep 1	Week 3 Sep 8	Week 4 Sep 15	Week 5 Sep 22	Week 6 Sep 29	Week 7 Oct 6	Week 8 Oct 13	Week 9 Oct 20	Week 10 Oct 27	Week 11 Nov 3	Week 12 Nov 10	Final	
		Dropped: No. 3 Furman; No. 8 Princeton; No. 10 Bryant; No. 11 Virginia; No. 21 Grand Canyon; No. 23 West Virginia; No. 24 UConn	Dropped: No. 3 Portland; No. 8 Saint Louis; No. 11 Washington; No. 15 Kansas City; No. 19 Duke; No. 20 NC State; No. 21 UNC Greensboro	Dropped: No. 19 Florida Atlantic; No. 25 Charlotte	Dropped: No. 11 UCLA; No. 15 Hofstra; No. 20 Marshall; No. 23т Oregon State; No. 23т High Point	Dropped: No. 17 Cornell; No. 23 UNC Wilmington; No. 25 UC Santa Barbara	Dropped: No. 12 Ohio State; No. 18 Princeton; No. 22 Rutgers; No. 24 Utah Valley; No. 25 Bryant	Dropped: No. 13 Notre Dame; No. 21 Oregon State; No. 23 Old Dominion	Dropped: No. 24 Albany; No. 25т San Diego; No. 25т Syracuse	Dropped: No. 17 Missouri State; No. 25 Stanford	Dropped: No. 20 Charlotte; No. 21т Oregon State	Dropped: No. 17 Xavier; No. 23т Vermont	Dropped: No. 22 Bryant; No. 24 South Carolina	None	

== Top Drawer Soccer ==
	Preseason Aug 6	Week 1 Aug 24	Week 2 Aug 31	Week 3 Sep 7	Week 4 Sep 14	Week 5 Sep 21	Week 6 Sep 28	Week 7 Oct 5	Week 8 Oct 12	Week 9 Oct 19	Week 10 Oct 26	Week 11 Nov 2	Week 12 Nov 9	Week 13 Nov 16	Week 14	Week 15	Final	
1.	Washington	San Diego (2–0–0)	Stanford (4–0–0)	Stanford (6–0–0)	South Carolina (6–0–0)	South Carolina (7–0–0)	SMU (7–0–1)	SMU (8–0–1)	SMU (9–0–1)	SMU (9–0–2)	SMU (12–0–2)	Georgetown (14–1–1)	Georgetown (14–1–2)	Akron (13–1–4)				1.
2.	Furman	Saint Louis (1–1–0)	Maryland (3–0–0)	Maryland (5–0–0)	Akron (4–0–1)	Indiana (7–0–1)	Indiana (8–0–2)	Indiana (9–0–2)	Indiana (11–0–2)	Georgetown (11–1–1)	Georgetown (13–1–1)	SMU (12–0–3)	SMU (13–0–3)	Indiana (15–1–4)				2.
3.	Saint Louis	Clemson (2–0–0)	SMU (3–0–0)	South Carolina (5–0–0)	Stanford (6–0–1)	SMU (6–0–1)	Kansas City (6–1–2)	Kansas City (7–1–2)	Georgetown (10–1–1)	Clemson (11–2–1)	Creighton (11–0–5)	Clemson (12–2–2)	Akron (11–1–4)	North Carolina (11–2–6)				3.
4.	Portland	Maryland (2–0–0)	San Diego (2–1–0)	Ohio State (4–0–0)	SMU (5–0–1)	Kansas City (5–1–2)	Clemson (7–2–0)	Clemson (9–2–0)	Clemson (10–2–1)	Creighton (10–0–5)	Akron (9–1–4)	Akron (10–1–4)	Indiana (14–1–3)	Georgetown (15–2–2)				4.
5.	Georgetown	Washington (1–1–0)	South Carolina (3–0–0)	Georgetown (4–1–1)	Ohio State (5–0–1)	Notre Dame (5–1–2)	Georgetown (8–1–1)	Georgetown (9–1–1)	Pittsburgh (7–2–2)	Indiana (11–1–2)	Clemson (11–2–2)	Indiana (13–1–3)	Clemson (12–3–2)	Portland (12–3–2)				5.
6.	NC State	Akron (1–0–1)	Oregon State (2–0–1)	Clemson (4–1–0)	Wisconsin (5–0–1)	Missouri State (6–0–1)	Missouri State (7–0–1)	Pittsburgh (6–2–2)	Akron (7–1–3)	Kansas City (9–2–2)	Kansas City (11–2–2)	Creighton (11–1–5)	Creighton (12–1–5)	SMU (13–1–3)				6.
7.	Maryland	High Point (2–0–0)	Ohio State (3–0–0)	Akron (2–0–1)	San Diego (5–1–1)	Maryland (6–1–0)	Michigan State (5–1–1)	Missouri State (8–0–2)	Kansas City (8–2–2)	Wake Forest (10–3–1)	Indiana (12–1–3)	Washington (10–3–3)	Portland (11–3–2)	Clemson (13–3–2)				7.
8.	Akron	Stanford (2–0–0)	Washington (2–2–0)	SMU (4–0–1)	Princeton (4–0–1)	Clemson (6–2–0)	Pittsburgh (6–2–1)	Xavier (7–0–2)	Creighton (10–0–4)	North Carolina (7–2–3)	Louisville (12–2–2)	Louisville (12–2–3)	Washington (10–4–3)	West Virginia (13–2–4)				8.
9.	High Point	Georgetown (1–0–1)	Clemson (2–1–0)	San Diego (3–1–1)	Indiana (6–0–1)	Georgetown (6–1–1)	Creighton (8–0–3)	Akron (6–1–2)	Wake Forest (8–3–1)	Pittsburgh (8–3–2)	Wake Forest (11–3–2)	Portland (9–3–2)	Maryland (12–4–1)	Creighton (12–2–5)				9.
10.	Stanford	Furman (0–1–1)	Georgetown (3–0–1)	Princeton (3–0–1)	Louisville (6–0–1)	Stanford (7–1–1)	Notre Dame (5–2–2)	Stanford (8–2–1)	Stanford (8–3–1)	Stanford (8–3–2)	Maryland (10–3–1)	Wake Forest (11–4–2)	North Carolina (9–2–6)	Washington (10–4–5)				10.
11.	UNC Greensboro	Portland (0–0–1)	Akron (2–0–1)	Wisconsin (5–0–0)	Old Dominion (6–0–0)	San Diego (5–2–1)	South Carolina (7–1–1)	Creighton (10–0–3)	UCLA (7–1–4)	Akron (7–1–4)	North Carolina (7–2–4)	Maryland (10–4–1)	Marshall (11–2–4)	Maryland (12–5–1)				11.
12.	San Diego	NC State (1–0–1)	High Point (2–1–0)	Indiana (5–0–1)	Maryland (5–1–0)	Old Dominion (7–1–0)	Maryland (6–1–1)	Maryland (6–2–1)	South Carolina (8–1–2)	Xavier (8–0–4)	Michigan State (9–2–3)	North Carolina (8–2–5)	West Virginia (11–2–4)	Bryant (13–3–5)				12.
13.	Princeton	Princeton (0–0–0)	Portland (0–1–1)	Oregon State (2–1–1)	Georgetown (5–1–1)	Ohio State (5–1–1)	Wake Forest (6–2–1)	Wake Forest (7–3–1)	Louisville (10–1–2)	Louisville (10–2–2)	Washington (8–3–3)	Kansas City (11–3–2)	Kansas City (11–3–2)	Rutgers (9–6–3)				13.
14.	SMU	UNC Greensboro (1–0–1)	Princeton (0–0–1)	Louisville (4–0–1)	Kansas City (4–1–1)	Wisconsin (5–1–1)	Wisconsin (5–2–2)	Syracuse (7–3–1)	Missouri State (9–1–2)	UCLA (7–2–4)	Xavier (9–1–4)	Missouri State (12–1–3)	Missouri State (12–1–3)	Cornell (13–3–2)				14.
15.	Duke	SMU (2–0–0)	UNC Greensboro (1–0–2)	Old Dominion (5–0–0)	Missouri State (5–0–0)	Louisville (6–0–2)	San Diego (5–2–2)	UCLA (5–1–4)	Michigan State (8–2–1)	Michigan State (9–2–2)	Wisconsin (9–2–4)	Marshall (10–2–4)	Rutgers (9–6–2)	Marshall (11–3–4)				15.
16.	Virginia	Duke (2–0–0)	Saint Louis (1–1–1)	Wake Forest (3–1–1)	Bryant (3–0–2)	Princeton (5–1–1)	Stanford (7–2–1)	South Carolina (7–1–2)	Georgia Southern (6–1–4)	Maryland (8–3–1)	Stanford (8–3–3)	Wisconsin (10–2–4)	Louisville (12–3–3)	Louisville (12–3–3)				16.
17.	Cornell	Cornell (0–0–0)	Cornell (1–0–0)	Cornell (2–0–0)	Cornell (2–1–0)	Akron (4–0–2)	Louisville (7–1–2)	Louisville (8–1–2)	Xavier (8–0–3)	Vermont (9–1–3)	UCLA (8–2–5)	West Virginia (10–2–4)	Wake Forest (11–5–3)	Wake Forest (11–5–3)				17.
18.	UConn	Indiana (2–0–0)	Indiana (3–0–0)	Vermont (4–0–1)	Notre Dame (3–1–2)	Wake Forest (5–2–1)	Akron (5–1–2)	San Diego (6–2–3)	Maryland (7–3–1)	Wisconsin (8–2–3)	Missouri State (10–1–3)	UNC Wilmington (11–2–2)	UCLA (9–4–5)	UCLA (9–4–5)				18.
19.	Bryant	Kansas City (2–0–0)	UCLA (2–0–1)	Kansas City (3–1–1)	Clemson (4–2–0)	Michigan State (4–1–1)	Syracuse (6–3–0)	Michigan State (7–2–1)	Oregon State (7–1–4)	Washington (8–3–2)	Pittsburgh (9–4–2)	Rutgers (8–6–2)	Wisconsin (10–2–4)	Wisconsin (10–3–4)				19.
20.	Denver	North Carolina (0–1–1)	Bryant (2–0–1)	High Point (2–2–1)	UC Santa Barbara (3–1–2)	Creighton (7–0–2)	Old Dominion (8–2–0)	West Virginia (5–1–3)	Wisconsin (7–2–3)	South Carolina (8–2–2)	UNC Wilmington (10–2–2)	Elon (10–2–4)	Bryant (12–2–4)	Oregon State (11–4–4)				20.
21.	Marshall	Marshall (1–0–0)	Furman (1–1–2)	Missouri State (4–0–0)	Wake Forest (4–2–1)	Rutgers (4–3–1)	UNC Wilmington (7–1–1)	Wisconsin (5–2–3)	North Carolina (6–2–3)	Missouri State (9–1–3)	Cornell (10–3–1)	Michigan State (10–3–3)	Cornell (11–3–2)	Kansas City (11–3–3)				21.
22.	Indiana	UCLA (1–0–1)	Duke (2–2–0)	UCLA (3–0–2)	Vermont (4–0–2)	Pittsburgh (5–2–1)	UNC Asheville (8–1–1)	UNC Wilmington (7–2–1)	UNC Wilmington (9–2–1)	Charlotte (7–1–3)	Vermont (9–2–3)	UCLA (8–3–5)	Albany (10–4–1)	Grand Canyon (13–5–2)				22.
23.	Kansas City	UMass (1–0–1)	Kansas City (2–1–0)	Bryant (2–0–2)	Fairleigh Dickinson (5–0–2)	Boston College (5–1–2)	Boston College (5–2–2)	Georgia Southern (5–1–3)	Cornell (7–2–1)	Georgia Southern (6–2–4)	Elon (9–2–4)	Bryant (11–2–4)	San Diego (10–4–3)	San Diego (11–5–3)				23.
24.	UCF	Bryant (1–0–1)	North Carolina (1–1–1)	Washington (3–2–1)	Washington (4–2–1)	Utah Valley (4–0–1)	Georgia Southern (4–1–2)	Cornell (6–2–0)	Washington (7–3–2)	UNC Wilmington (9–2–1)	South Carolina (10–3–2)	Pittsburgh (9–4–3)	UNC Wilmington (11–3–2)	Missouri State (12–2–3)				24.
25.	North Carolina	Virginia (0–2–0)	Marshall (1–0–1)	Michigan State (4–0–1)	UNC Wilmington (4–0–1)	Bryant (4–1–2)	Xavier (6–0–2)	Washington (6–3–2)	Vermont (8–1–3)	High Point (10–3–1)	Charlotte (7–2–3)	Cornell (10–3–2)	Pittsburgh (9–4–4)	North Florida (12–4–3)				25.
	Preseason Aug 6	Week 1 Aug 24	Week 2 Aug 31	Week 3 Sep 7	Week 4 Sep 14	Week 5 Sep 21	Week 6 Sep 28	Week 7 Oct 5	Week 8 Oct 12	Week 9 Oct 19	Week 10 Oct 26	Week 11 Nov 2	Week 12 Nov 9	Week 13 Nov 16	Week 14	Week 15	Final	
		Dropped: No. 18 UConn; No. 20 Denver; No. 24 UCF	Dropped: No. 12 NC State; No. 23 UMass; No. 25 Virginia	Dropped: No. 13 Portland; No. 15 UNC Greensboro; No. 16 Saint Louis; No. 21 Furman; No. 22 Duke; No. 24 North Carolina; No. 25 Marshall	Dropped: No. 13 Oregon State; No. 20 High Point; No. 22 UCLA; No. 25 Michigan State	Dropped: No. 17 Cornell; No. 20 UC Santa Barbara; No. 22 Vermont; No. 23 Fairleigh Dickinson; No. 24 Washington; No. 25 UNC Wilmington	Dropped: No. 13 Ohio State; No. 16 Princeton; No. 21 Rutgers; No. 24 Utah Valley; No. 25 Bryant	Dropped: No. 10 Notre Dame; No. 20 Old Dominion; No. 22 UNC Asheville; No. 23 Boston College	Dropped: No. 14 Syracuse; No. 18 San Diego; No. 20 West Virginia	Dropped: No. 19 Oregon State; No. 23 Cornell	Dropped: No. 23 Georgia Southern; No. 25 High Point	Dropped: No. 14 Xavier; No. 16 Stanford; No. 22 Vermont; No. 24 South Carolina; No. 25 Charlotte	Dropped: No. 20 Elon; No. 21 Michigan State	Dropped: No. 22 Albany; No. 24 UNC Wilmington; No. 25 Pittsburgh	None	None	None	

== College Soccer News ==
	Preseason Aug 14	Week 1 Aug 25	Week 2 Sep 1	Week 3 Sep 8	Week 4 Sep 15	Week 5 Sep 22	Week 6 Sep 29	Week 7 Oct 6	Week 8 Oct 13	Week 9 Oct 20	Week 10 Oct 27	Week 11 Nov 2	Week 12	Final	
1.	Washington	Stanford (2–0–0)	Stanford (4–0–0)	Stanford (6–0–0)	Stanford (6–0–1)	Stanford (7–1–1)	SMU (7–0–1)	SMU (9–0–1)	SMU (10–0–1)	SMU (10–0–2)	Georgetown (13–1–1)	Georgetown (14–1–1)			1.
2.	NC State	Maryland (1–0–0)	Maryland (3–0–0)	Maryland (6–0–0)	SMU (5–0–1)	Indiana (7–0–1)	Indiana (8–0–2)	Indiana (9–0–2)	Indiana (11–0–2)	Georgetown (11–1–1)	SMU (11–0–2)	SMU (12–0–3)			2.
3.	Georgetown	Georgetown (1–0–1)	Georgetown (3–0–1)	Georgetown (4–1–1)	Ohio State (5–0–1)	SMU (7–0–1)	Georgetown (8–1–1)	Georgetown (9–1–1)	Georgetown (10–1–1)	Clemson (11–2–1)	Clemson (11–2–2)	Clemson (12–2–2)			3.
4.	Maryland	San Diego (2–0–0)	SMU (4–0–0)	SMU (5–0–1)	Indiana (6–0–1)	South Carolina (7–0–0)	Maryland (6–1–1)	Kansas City (7–1–2)	Clemson (10–2–1)	Indiana (11–1–2)	Indiana (12–1–3)	Indiana (13–1–3)			4.
5.	Portland	NC State (1–0–1)	San Diego (2–1–1)	Indiana (6–0–1)	Maryland (5–0–1)	Georgetown (6–1–1)	South Carolina (7–1–1)	Creighton (10–0–3)	Creighton (10–0–4)	Creighton (10–0–5)	Creighton (11–0–5)	Akron (10–1–4)			5.
6.	Saint Louis	Washington (1–1–0)	Indiana (3–0–1)	San Diego (3–1–1)	Georgetown (5–1–1)	Maryland (6–1–0)	Creighton (8–0–3)	Maryland (6–2–1)	South Carolina (8–1–2)	Michigan State (9–2–2)	Michigan State (9–2–3)	Creighton (11–1–5)			6.
7.	Furman	High Point (1–0–0)	Vermont (2–0–1)	Ohio State (4–0–0)	South Carolina (6–0–0)	Ohio State (5–1–1)	Kansas City (6–1–2)	Clemson (9–2–0)	Kansas City (8–2–2)	Maryland (8–3–1)	Kansas City (11–2–2)	Maryland (10–4–1)			7.
8.	Stanford	Indiana (2–0–0)	High Point (2–1–0)	Vermont (4–0–1)	San Diego (5–1–1)	Akron (4–0–2)	Stanford (7–2–1)	South Carolina (7–1–2)	Pittsburgh (7–2–2)	Pittsburgh (8–3–2)	Maryland (10–3–1)	Kansas City (11–3–2)			8.
9.	Virginia	SMU (1–0–0)	Princeton (1–0–1)	Akron (2–0–1)	Akron (4–0–1)	San Diego (5–2–1)	Clemson (7–2–0)	Missouri State (8–0–2)	Maryland (7–3–1)	South Carolina (9–2–2)	Akron (9–1–4)	Michigan State (10–3–3)			9.
10.	Princeton	Princeton (0–0–0)	Washington (2–2–0)	Princeton (4–0–1)	Princeton (4–0–1)	Creighton (7–0–2)	Akron (5–1–2)	Akron (6–1–2)	Akron (7–1–3)	Kansas City (9–2–2)	Louisville (12–2–2)	Louisville (12–2–3)			10.
11.	Bryant	Portland (0–0–1)	Akron (2–0–1)	South Carolina (6–0–0)	Wisconsin (5–0–1)	Princeton (5–1–1)	Michigan State (5–1–1)	Pittsburgh (6–2–2)	Michigan State (8–2–1)	Akron (7–1–4)	Pittsburgh (9–4–2)	Wisconsin (10–2–4)			11.
12.	Akron	Saint Louis (1–0–0)	Ohio State (3–0–0)	Marshall (2–0–2)	Vermont (4–0–2)	Wisconsin (5–1–1)	Missouri State (7–0–1)	Michigan State (7–2–1)	Louisville (10–1–2)	Louisville (10–2–2)	Wisconsin (9–2–4)	Washington (10–3–3)			12.
13.	High Point	Clemson (2–0–0)	Oregon State (2–0–1)	Clemson (4–1–0)	Creighton (6–0–2)	Kansas City (5–1–2)	Wisconsin (5–2–2)	Stanford (8–2–1)	Missouri State (9–1–2)	Wisconsin (8–2–3)	Cornell (10–3–1)	Pittsburgh (9–4–3)			13.
14.	SMU	Vermont (2–0–0)	Marshall (1–0–1)	Oregon State (2–1–1)	Louisville (6–0–1)	Louisville (6–0–2)	Notre Dame (5–2–2)	Louisville (8–1–2)	Wisconsin (7–2–3)	Vermont (9–1–3)	Wake Forest (11–3–2)	West Virginia (9–2–4)			14.
15.	San Diego	Marshall (1–0–0)	Clemson (2–1–0)	Washington (3–2–1)	Cornell (2–1–0)	Missouri State (6–0–1)	San Diego (5–2–2)	Wisconsin (5–2–3)	Stanford (8–3–1)	Xavier (8–0–4)	South Carolina (9–3–2)	Cornell (10–3–1)			15.
16.	Marshall	Akron (1–0–0)	Portland (0–2–1)	Wisconsin (5–0–0)	Washington (4–2–1)	Notre Dame (5–1–2)	Ohio State (5–2–2)	Vermont (7–1–3)	Xavier (8–0–3)	Cornell (8–3–0)	Washington (8–3–3)	Wake Forest (11–4–2)			16.
17.	Indiana	Duke (2–0–0)	Saint Louis (1–1–1)	High Point (2–2–1)	Missouri State (5–0–0)	Clemson (6–2–0)	Pittsburgh (6–2–1)	West Virginia (5–1–3)	Vermont (8–1–3)	Washington (8–3–2)	Vermont (9–2–3)	Portland (10–3–2)			17.
18.	UNC Greensboro	Bryant (1–0–1)	UCLA (2–0–1)	UCLA (3–0–2)	Oregon State (2–1–3)	Michigan State (6–1–1)	Louisville (7–1–2)	Notre Dame (5–3–3)	Oregon State (7–1–4)	Missouri State (9–1–3)	Xavier (9–1–4)	North Carolina (8–2–5)			18.
19.	Vermont	UNC Greensboro (1–0–1)	NC State (1–1–2)	Michigan State (3–0–1)	Clemson (4–2–0)	Vermont (5–1–2)	Princeton (5–2–2)	Washington (6–3–2)	Charlotte (7–1–3)	UCLA (7–2–4)	North Carolina (7–2–4)	Missouri State (12–1–3)			19.
20.	North Carolina	Virginia (0–2–0)	South Carolina (3–0–0)	Cornell (2–0–0)	Michigan State (4–1–1)	Old Dominion (7–1–0)	Vermont (6–1–2)	San Diego (6–2–3)	Cornell (7–2–0)	Stanford (8–3–2)	UCLA (8–2–5)	UCLA (8–3–5)			20.
21.	Oregon State	Ohio State (1–0–0)	UNC Greensboro (1–0–2)	Creighton (5–0–1)	Marshall (2–1–2)	Utah Valley (4–0–1)	Washington (6–3–1)	Xavier (7–0–2)	Washington (7–3–2)	Charlotte (7–1–4)	Stanford (8–3–3)	South Carolina (10–4–2)			21.
22.	West Virginia	North Carolina (0–1–1)	Bryant (2–0–1)	Bryant (2–0–2)	Kansas City (4–1–1)	Cornell (3–2–0)	Old Dominion (8–2–0)	Charlotte (5–1–3)	West Virginia (5–2–3)	Wake Forest (10–3–1)	West Virginia (8–2–4)	UNC Wilmington (11–2–2)			22.
23.	Denver	Oregon State (1–0–1)	Louisville (3–0–1)	Louisville (4–0–1)	UCLA (3–1–2)	Washington (4–3–1)	West Virginia (5–1–2)	Oregon State (5–1–4)	UCLA (7–1–4)	North Carolina (7–2–3)	Missouri State (10–1–3)	Marshall (9–2–4)			23.
24.	Cornell	Kansas City (1–0–0)	Wisconsin (4–0–0)	Hofstra (4–0–1)	Old Dominion (6–0–0)	Oregon State (3–1–3)	Oregon State (4–1–3)	Cornell (6–2–0)	UNC Wilmington (9–2–1)	West Virginia (6–2–4)	UNC Wilmington (10–2–1)	Xavier (9–2–4)			24.
25.	Duke	UCLA (1–0–0)	Cornell (1–0–0)	Missouri State (4–0–0)	Hofstra (4–0–2)	Hofstra (5–1–2)	Utah Valley (4–0–2)	Princeton (6–2–2)	Princeton (6–2–4)	Oregon State (7–3–4)	Portland (9–3–2)	Vermont (9–2–4)			25.
	Preseason Aug 14	Week 1 Aug 25	Week 2 Sep 1	Week 3 Sep 8	Week 4 Sep 15	Week 5 Sep 22	Week 6 Sep 29	Week 7 Oct 6	Week 8 Oct 13	Week 9 Oct 20	Week 10 Oct 27	Week 11 Nov 2	Week 12	Final	
		Dropped: No. 7 Furman; No. 22 West Virginia; No. 23 Denver; No. 24 Cornell	Dropped: No. 17 Duke; No. 20 Virginia; No. 22 North Carolina; No. 24 Kansas City	Dropped: No. 16 Portland; No. 17 Saint Louis; No. 19 NC State; No. 21 UNC Greensboro	Dropped: No. 17 High Point; No. 22 Bryant	Dropped: No. 21 Marshall; No. 23 UCLA	Dropped: No. 22 Cornell; No. 25 Hofstra	Dropped: No. 16 Ohio State; No. 22 Old Dominion; No. 25 Utah Valley	Dropped: No. 18 Notre Dame; No. 20 San Diego	Dropped: No. 24 UNC Wilmington; No. 25 Princeton	Dropped: No. 21 Charlotte; No. 25 Oregon State	Dropped: No. 21 Stanford	None	None	
