= 2026 NCAA Division I men's soccer tournament =

2026 edition of the NCAA Division I men's soccer tournament

- Classification: Division I
- Teams: 48
- Matches: 47
- Site: WakeMed Soccer Park (semifinal and final); Cary, North Carolina
- Broadcast: ESPN2, ESPNU, ESPN+, ACCN

The 2026 NCAA Division I men's soccer tournament will be the 68th edition of the NCAA Division I men's soccer tournament, a postseason tournament to determine the national champion of the 2026 NCAA Division I men's soccer season. The College Cup will be played on December 11 and December 14 at WakeMed Soccer Park in Cary, North Carolina.

Washington is entering the season and tournament as the defending national champion.

== Background and format ==
The NCAA has been awarding a national men's soccer championship to men's varsity soccer programs since 1959. Since its inaugural tournament, the NCAA Division I men's soccer tournament has been held annually at the conclusion of the NCAA Division I men's soccer regular season, from mid-November to mid-December, with the exception of the 2020 tournament, which was played in May 2021 due to the COVID-19 pandemic. At the time of the inaugural tournament, eight teams participated in the national tournament and has expanded in size since then. Since 2001, the tournament has featured 48 teams, with the exception of the 2020 tournament, which was reduced to 32 teams due to COVID-19.

On December 9, 2024, the NCAA confirmed that WakeMed Soccer Park in Cary, North Carolina (near the Raleigh-Durham region) would host the College Cup (semifinals and final).

== Qualification ==
All Division I men's soccer programs are eligible to qualify for the tournament. 23 teams received automatic bids by winning their conference tournaments and an additional 25 teams earned at-large bids based on their regular season records.

Automatic bids
Conference	Team	Date qualified	Record	Appearance	Last bid
American	Tulsa	November 14	9–4–5	14th	2022
America East	Bryant	November 15	13–2–5	3rd	2025
ACC	North Carolina	November 15	11–2–6	33rd	2025
Atlantic 10	Saint Louis	November 14	10–4–5	53rd	2025
ASUN	North Florida	November 14	13–4–3	4th	2025
Big East (Note: Akron is a men's soccer affiliate member of the Big East Conference, as its primary conference; the Mid-American Conference does not sponsor men's soccer.)	Akron	November 15	13–1–4	34th	2025
Big South	Longwood	November 14	11–7–1	1st	None
Big Ten	Indiana	November 15	15–1–4	51st	2025
Big West	Cal State Bakersfield	November 13	7–4–7	2nd	2011
CAA	Charleston	November 14	10–4–5	6th	2010
Horizon	Cleveland State	November 14	9–6–4	12th	2025
Ivy	Cornell	November 15	11–3–1	14th	2025
Metro	Sacred Heart	November 14	9–5–7	1st	None
Missouri Valley	Bowling Green	November 14	10–6–3	9th	2021
MWC	Grand Canyon	November 14	13–5–2	5th	2025
NEC	Fairleigh Dickinson	November 15	13–3–3	20th	2025
Ohio Valley	Houston Christian	November 14	7–7–7	1st	None
Pac-12	Oregon State	November 14	11–4–4	11th	2025
Patriot	Lehigh	November 14	8–7–5	6th	2019
SoCon	Liberty	November 14	8–7–3	3rd	2011
Summit League	Omaha	November 14	11–4–3	4th	2023
Sun Belt (Note: South Carolina and West Virginia are men's soccer affiliates of the Sun Belt Conference. Neither the Southeastern Conference (primary home of South Carolina) nor the Big 12 Conference (primary home of West Virginia) sponsors men's soccer.)	West Virginia	November 15	13–2–4	19th	2025
West Coast	Portland	November 14	13–3–2	21st	2025

At-large bids
Conference	Team	Record	Appearance	Last bid
American (Note: Missouri State is a men's soccer affiliate member of the American Conference, as its primary home of Conference USA does not sponsor men's soccer.)	Charlotte	10–3–5	19th	2024
American	Missouri State	12–2–3	19th	2024
America East	Vermont	10–2–5	16th	2025
ACC	California	6–5–5	21st	2019
ACC	Clemson	13–3–2	39th	2025
ACC	Louisville	12–3–3	16th	2023
ACC	NC State	7–6–6	19th	2025
ACC	Pittsburgh	9–4–4	9th	2024
ACC	SMU	14–1–3	38th	2025
ACC	Stanford	9–5–3	24th	2025
ACC	Syracuse	8–8–3	11th	2025
ACC	Wake Forest	11–5–3	29th	2024
Big East	Creighton	12–2–5	26th	2022
Big East	Georgetown	15–2–2	17th	2025
Big Ten	Maryland	12–5–1	43rd	2025
Big Ten	Michigan State	10–5–3	21st	2018
Big Ten	Rutgers	9–6–3	19th	2022
Big Ten	UCLA	9–4–5	51st	2025
Big Ten	Washington	10–4–5	31st	2025
Big Ten	Wisconsin	10–3–4	8th	2017
CAA	UNC Wilmington	11–3–2	5th	2018
Summit League	Kansas City	11–3–3	6th	2025
Sun Belt	Marshall	11–3–4	8th	2025
Sun Belt	South Carolina	12–6–2	23rd	2016
WCC	San Diego	11–5–3	19th	2025

=== Seeded teams ===
The top 24 teams are seeded, with the top 16 earning a bye to the second round of the tournament.

Seeded teams
Seed	School	Conference	Record	Berth type	United Soccer Coaches ranking
1	Georgetown	Big East	15–2–2	At-large	2
2	SMU	ACC	14–1–3	At-large	1
3	Indiana	Big Ten	15–1–4	Automatic	3
4	Akron	Big East	13–1–4	Automatic	4
5	Clemson	ACC	13–3–2	At-large	5
6	Maryland	Big Ten	12–5–1	At-large	9
7	North Carolina	ACC	11–2–6	Automatic	12
8	Pittsburgh	ACC	9–4–4	At-large	21
9	Rutgers	Big Ten	9–6–3	At-large	15
10	South Carolina	Sun Belt	12–6–2	At-large	RV
11	Louisville	ACC	12–3–3	At-large	13
12	Kansas City	Summit League	11–3–3	At-large	14
13	Michigan State	Big Ten	10–5–3	At-large	22
14	West Virginia	Sun Belt	13–2–4	Automatic	7
15	Wisconsin	Big Ten	10–3–4	At-large	24т
16	UCLA	Big Ten	9–4–5	At-large	18
17	Creighton	Big East	12–2–5	At-large	8
18	Charlotte	American	10–3–5	At-large	NR
19	Washington	Big Ten	10–4–5	At-large	11
20	Marshall	Sun Belt	11–3–4	At-large	10
21	Stanford	ACC	9–5–3	At-large	NR
22	Oregon State	Pac-12	11–4–4	Automatic	24т
23	Portland	WCC	13–3–2	Automatic	6
24	Cornell	Ivy	11–3–1	Automatic	17

== Bracket ==
The bracket was announced on Monday, November 16, 2026. First round games will be played on November 19 at campus sites.

=== Georgetown Region 1 ===
First round November 19
Syracuse*	3
Sacred Heart	2
17	Creighton*	0
Omaha	2
24	Cornell*	6
Fairleigh Dickinson	0
San Diego*	2
Grand Canyon (a.e.t.)	3

Second round November 22
1	Georgetown*
Syracuse
Omaha
16	UCLA*
9	Rutgers*
24	Cornell
Grand Canyon
8	Pittsburgh*

Third round November 28–29

Quarterfinals; December 4–5

*Host institution

==== Schedule ====
===== First round =====
November 19	Syracuse	3–2	Sacred Heart	Syracuse, NY
6:00 p.m. EST	Dakota Jonke 60'; Garrett Holman 63'; Kelvin Da Costa (yellow card) 80'; Ivan Irinimbabazi 83'	Report	Ivan Morcillo 66'; Danny Istambouli 79' (pen.)	Stadium: SU Soccer Stadium; Attendance: 1,200; Referee: Carlos Fernandes; Assistant referees: Ankur Singh; Patrick O'Hara; Fourth official: Ashley Cedro

November 19	(17) Creighton	2–0	Omaha	Omaha, NE
6:30 p.m. CST		Report	Maguire Perkins 17', 73'	Stadium: Morrison Stadium; Attendance: 5,552; Referee: Dimitar Chavdarov; Assistant referees: Brendan Sweetman; Ben Merritt; Fourth official: Esad Omanovic

November 19	(24) Cornell	6–0	Fairleigh Dickinson	Ithaca, NY
7:00 p.m. EST	Ashton Wray 22'; Lennon Harrington 57', 77' (pen.); Connor Miller (yellow card) 63'; Kasper Wollstein 68'; Aidan Martin (yellow card) 76'; Nate Hovan 84'; Sergio Zapata 88'	Report	Matt Giraldo (yellow card) 68'; Ryan Kopay (yellow card) 85'; Dominic Valenzuela (yellow card) 90'	Stadium: Charles F. Berman Field; Attendance: 720

November 19	San Diego	2–3 (a.e.t.)	Grand Canyon	San Diego, CA
7:00 p.m. PST	Samy Kanaan 64'; Team (yellow card) 68'; Iain Wagner 68'	Report	Jorge Lopez 64'; Ife Nkabu 90'; Team (yellow card) 90'; Cruzeiro Cruz (yellow card) 91'; Devin Dillon 101' (o.g.)	Stadium: Torero Stadium; Attendance: 1,006; Referee: Michael Matson; Assistant referees: Abdel Hakeem Wakil; Aleh Maslianka; Fourth official: Austin Cozzi

===== Second round =====
November 22	(1) Georgetown	v	Syracuse	Washington, D.C.
5:00 p.m. EST				Stadium: Shaw Field

November 22	(8) Pittsburgh	v	Grand Canyon	Pittsburgh, PA
6:00 p.m. EST				Stadium: Ambrose Urbanic Field

November 22	(9) Rutgers	v	(24) Cornell	New Brunswick, NJ
6:00 p.m. EST				Stadium: Yurcak Field

November 22	(16) UCLA	v	Omaha	Los Angeles, CA
4:00 p.m. PST				Stadium: Wallis Annenberg Stadium

===== Third round =====
November 28–29	v

November 28–29	v

===== Quarterfinals =====
December 4–5	v

=== SMU Region 2 ===
First round November 19
UNC Wilmington*	2
Liberty	0
23	Portland*	3
California	2
18	Charlotte*	2
Lehigh	1
Bryant*	3
Houston Christian	2

Second round November 22
7	North Carolina*
UNC Wilmington
23	Portland
10	South Carolina*
15	Wisconsin*	2
18	Charlotte	0
Bryant
2	SMU*

Third round November 28–29
15	Wisconsin

Quarterfinals; December 4–5

*Host institution

==== Schedule ====
===== First round =====
November 19	(18) Charlotte	2–1	Lehigh	Charlotte, NC
6:00 p.m. EST	Natsuki Ogata 37'; Diogo Veloso (yellow card) 47'; Larry Noel 53'	Report	Thomas Robertson 64'; Trey Sheeler (yellow card) 67'; Massimo Talarico (yellow card) 85'	Stadium: Transamerica Field; Attendance: 830; Referee: Otto Leon; Assistant referees: Chris Zuerner; Carmen Serbio; Fourth official: Kevin Maurer

November 19	UNC Wilmington	2–0	Liberty	Wilmington, NC
6:00 p.m. EST	Cameron Keay 35'; Kieran Radke (yellow card) 41'; Benjamin Gooding (yellow card) 42' (goal) 62'	Report	Samson Kpardeh (yellow card) 15'; Oscar Vallejo (yellow card) 47'	Stadium: UNCW Soccer Stadium; Attendance: 2,212; Referee: David Bosak; Assistant referees: Richard Wells; Marcus Moss; Fourth official: Dustin Thorne

November 19	Bryant	3–2	Houston Christian	Smithfield, RI
7:00 p.m. EST	Jojo Ocran (yellow card) 7'; Marcos Blasco 14'; Paco Fernandez 46'; Fermin Rodriguez 70' (yellow card) 70'	Report	Luca Pintus 37'; Ryan Okerayi (yellow card) 48' (goal) 62'; Ninor Olu (yellow card) 60'; Nico Cross (yellow card) 85'	Stadium: Beirne Stadium; Attendance: 2,783; Referee: Kevin Morrison; Assistant referees: Claudia Badea; Thomas Felice; Fourth official: Devin Miller

November 19	(23) Portland	3–2	California	Portland, OR
7:00 p.m. PST	Joe Highfield 50', 54'; Diego Rosas 55'; Nikos Clarke-Tosczak (yellow card) 75'	Report	Callen Lewis 61'; Lucca Guimaraes 86'	Stadium: Merlo Field; Attendance: 2,255; Referee: Baboucar Jallow; Assistant referees: Cody Zipp; Dion Coxe; Fourth official: Mike Hohnholz

===== Second round =====
November 22	(15) Wisconsin	v	(18) Charlotte	Madison, WI
2:00 p.m. CST				Stadium: Dan McClimon Memorial Track/Soccer Complex

November 22	(7) North Carolina	v	UNC Wilmington	Chapel Hill, NC
5:00 p.m. EST				Stadium: Dorrance Field

November 22	(2) SMU	v	Bryant	Dallas, TX
6:00 p.m. CST				Stadium: Washburne Stadium

November 22	(10) South Carolina	v	(23) Portland	Columbia, SC
7:00 p.m. EST				Stadium: Stone Stadium

===== Third round =====
November 28–29	v

November 28–29	v

===== Quarterfinals =====
December 4–5	v

=== Indiana Region 3 ===
First round November 19
Missouri State*	1
Saint Louis	0
19	Washington*	3
Cleveland State	0
22	Oregon State*	4
Cal State Bakersfield	0
NC State*	2
Charleston	1

Second round November 22
3	Indiana*	0 (5)
Missouri State	0 (4)
19	Washington	1 (a.e.t.)
14	West Virginia*	0
11	Louisville*
22	Oregon State
NC State	2
6	Maryland*	1

Third round November 28–29
3	Indiana*
19	Washington
NC State

Quarterfinals; December 4–5

*Host institution

==== Schedule ====
===== First round =====
November 19	NC State	2–1	Charleston	Raleigh, NC
6:00 p.m. EST	Hayato Takayama 67'; Nakai Antoine (yellow card) 68'; Tyler Caton 71' (pen.)	Report	Matt Lenert 23'; Ignacio Ferrer Matas (yellow card) 55'	Stadium: Dail Soccer Field; Attendance: 1,091; Referee: Muhammad Kaleia; Assistant referees: Rick Rogers; Luis Pineres; Fourth official: Nicholas Strednak

November 19	Missouri State	1–0	Saint Louis	Springfield, MO
6:30 p.m. CST	Daniel Souza 1' (yellow card) 83'; Joey Dawson (yellow card) 42'; Adrián Esteban (yellow card) 87'	Report	JC Cortez (yellow card) 62'; Axel Torres (yellow card) 85'	Stadium: Betty & Bobby Allison South Stadium; Attendance: 1,012; Referee: Drew Klemp; Assistant referees: Matt Trotter; Albert Kyei-Mensah; Fourth official: Jose Lara

November 19	(22) Oregon State	4–0	Cal State Bakersfield	Corvallis, OR
6:00 p.m. PST	Gavin Wolff 3' (pen.) (yellow card) 24'; Evan Carlock 7'; Max Eisenberg 78'; Jacob Zapien 90' (pen.)	Report	Justin Knighton (yellow card) 39'; Ulisse Alberti (yellow card) 68'; Lorimer Bouman (red card) 82'; Team (yellow card) 90'	Stadium: Patrick Wayne Valley Stadium; Referee: Christopher Calderon; Assistant referees: Eric Krueger; Cameron Zipp; Fourth official: Alejandro Echeverri

November 19	(19) Washington	3–0	Cleveland State	Seattle, WA
7:00 p.m. PST	Callum Lugton 51'; Jake Goetting 55'; Shaun Brun (yellow card) 80'; Alex Hall 87'	Report		Stadium: Husky Soccer Stadium; Attendance: 1,402; Referee: Will Niccolls; Assistant referees: Raymond Moffatte Jr. Oleksii Medviediev; Fourth official: Pavel Spichak

===== Second round =====
November 22	(3) Indiana	v	Missouri State	Bloomington, IN
12:00 p.m. EST				Stadium: Bill Armstrong Stadium

November 22	(6) Maryland	v	NC State	College Park, MD
1:00 p.m. EST				Stadium: Ludwig Field

November 22	(14) West Virginia	v	(19) Washington	Morgantown, WV
3:00 p.m. EST				Stadium: Dick Dlesk Soccer Stadium

November 22	(11) Louisville	v	(22) Oregon State	Louisville, KY
6:00 p.m. EST				Stadium: Dr. Mark & Cindy Lynn Stadium

===== Third round =====
November 28–29	v

November 28–29	v

===== Quarterfinals =====
December 4–5	v

=== Akron Region 4 ===
First round November 19
Vermont*	2
North Florida	1
21	Stanford*	1
Tulsa	0
20	Marshall*	4
Bowling Green	0
Wake Forest*	4
Longwood	1

Second round November 22
5	Clemson*
Vermont
21	Stanford
12	Kansas City*
13	Michigan State*	0 (3)
20	Marshall	0 (5)
Wake Forest	2
4	Akron*	1

Third round November 28–29
20	Marshall*
Wake Forest

Quarterfinals; December 4–5

*Host institution

==== Schedule ====
===== First round =====
November 19	Wake Forest	v	Longwood	Winston-Salem, NC
6:00 p.m. EST				Stadium: Spry Stadium

November 19	Vermont	v	North Florida	Burlington, VT
7:00 p.m. EST				Stadium: Virtue Field

November 19	(20) Marshall	v	Bowling Green	Huntington, WV
7:15 p.m. EST				Stadium: Veterans Memorial Soccer Complex

November 19	(21) Stanford	v	Tulsa	Stanford, CA
6:00 p.m. PST				Stadium: Cagan Stadium

===== Second round =====
November 22	(4) Akron	v	Akron, OH
1:00 p.m. EST			Stadium: FirstEnergy Stadium

November 22	(13) Michigan State	v	East Lansing, MI
2:00 p.m. EST			Stadium: DeMartin Stadium

November 22	(5) Clemson	v	Clemson, SC
6:00 p.m. EST			Stadium: Riggs Field

November 22	(12) Kansas	v	Kansas City, MO
5:00 p.m. CST			Stadium: Durwood Soccer Stadium

===== Third round =====
November 28–29	v

November 28–29	v

===== Quarterfinals =====
December 4–5	v
