= 2026 Washington Huskies men's soccer team =

American college soccer season

2026 Washington Huskies men's soccer
- Conference: Big Ten Conference
- U. Soc. Coaches poll: No. 6
- TopDrawerSoccer.com: No. 7
- Record: 10–4–3 (6–2–2 B1G)
- Head coach: Jamie Clark (16th season)
- Assistant coaches: Mark Collings (6th season); Richard Reece (22nd season); Ryan Fahey (3rd season)
- Home stadium: Husky Soccer Stadium

2026 Big Ten Conference men's soccer standings
	Conf.						Overall
Team	W		L		T	PCT	W		L		T	PCT
No. 4 Indiana ‍†‍‍	7	–	1	–	2	.800	14	–	1	–	3	.861
No. 6 Washington ‍‍‍	6	–	2	–	2	.700	10	–	4	–	3	.676
No. 23 Rutgers ‍‍‍	6	–	3	–	1	.650	8	–	6	–	2	.563
No. 16 Michigan State ‍‍‍	5	–	3	–	2	.600	10	–	4	–	3	.676
No. 11 Maryland ‍‍‍	5	–	4	–	1	.550	11	–	4	–	1	.719
No. 25т UCLA ‍‍‍	4	–	3	–	3	.550	9	–	3	–	5	.676
No. 13 Wisconsin ‍‍‍	3	–	3	–	4	.500	10	–	3	–	4	.706
Northwestern ‍‍‍	3	–	4	–	3	.450	6	–	6	–	4	.500
Ohio State ‍‍‍	3	–	6	–	1	.350	8	–	6	–	2	.563
Michigan ‍‍‍	0	–	6	–	4	.200	3	–	8	–	5	.344
Penn State ‍‍‍	0	–	7	–	3	.150	3	–	9	–	3	.300
† – Conference champion ‡ – 2026 B1G tournament champion y – Invited to the 2026 NCAA Tournament; As of November 4, 2026; Rankings from United Soccer Coaches; Source: Big Ten

The 2026 Washington Huskies men's soccer team represents the University of Washington during the 2026 NCAA Division I men's soccer season. The Huskies are led by head coach Jamie Clark, in his sixteenth season, and play their home games at Husky Soccer Stadium in Seattle, Washington. It is the team's third season competing in the Big Ten Conference.

The Huskies entered the season as the defending national champions and were ranked first in the preseason United Soccer Coaches and TopDrawerSoccer polls. They opened their title defense with a 2–1 loss to eighteenth-ranked San Diego in front of 1,801 fans, the largest crowd for a season opener in program history. Washington defeated third-ranked Portland 4–2 a week later, but after a 2–2–1 start the Huskies dropped out of the United Soccer Coaches poll for most of September. They opened Big Ten play with a 4–2 win over Penn State and, after a 1–0 loss at second-ranked Indiana, shut out third-ranked Ohio State 4–0 on the road, holding the Buckeyes without a shot on goal. Goalkeeper Stockton Short was sent off in the 30th minute of a 0–0 draw with nineteenth-ranked Wisconsin, and the Huskies came from behind against Northwestern with goals in the 81st and 82nd minutes. A 1–1 draw at sixth-ranked Michigan State, secured by a Zach Ramsey free kick, and a 1–0 win at Michigan left Washington tied with Indiana and Michigan State atop the conference with two matches remaining.

The Huskies entered the final day of the regular season tied with Indiana at 20 points, but lost 1–0 at twenty-fifth-ranked UCLA while Indiana won to claim the regular season title outright. Washington finished the regular season 10–4–3 overall and 6–2–2 in conference play, and earned the second seed and a first-round bye in the Big Ten Tournament, in which it will host a semifinal at Husky Soccer Stadium. Midfielder Zach Ramsey, who was selected in the 2026 MLS SuperDraft but returned to Washington, scored 18 of the team's 39 regular season goals.

== Background ==
The Huskies finished the 2025 season 16–6–2 overall and won the NCAA tournament to claim the national championship. Following the season, five Huskies were selected in the 2026 MLS SuperDraft, the most of any school.

== Player movement ==
=== Players leaving ===
Departures
Name	Number	Pos.	Height	Year	Hometown	Reason for Departure
Levi Bieber	0	GK	6'5"	Junior	Tacoma, Washington	Transferred to Seattle U
Jadon Bowton	1	GK	6'4"	Graduate Student	Spokane, Washington	Graduated
Philip Kleemann	2	DF	6'4"	Senior	Newbury Park, California	—
Charlie Kosakoff	9	FW	5'11"	Junior	San Diego, California	—
Richie Aman	10	MF	5'9"	Senior	Hanover, New Hampshire	Drafted 8th overall in the 2026 MLS SuperDraft by D.C. United
Joe Dale	14	MF	5'9"	Senior	Seattle, Washington	Drafted 51st overall in the 2026 MLS SuperDraft by Seattle Sounders FC; signed with Tacoma Defiance
Mani Diop	15	MF	6'5"	Senior	Kaolack, Senegal	Graduated
Nani Deperro	18	FW	5'9"	Senior	Bend, Oregon	—
Mikey Sherlock	19	MF	6'1"	Senior	Del Mar, California	—
Conner Leber	22	DF	6'2"	Sophomore	Phoenix, Arizona	—
Sheehan Ganguly	23	MF	5'6"	Junior	Bellevue, Washington	—
Brecken Bowers	31	MF	5'10"	Sophomore	Woodinville, Washington	—

Zach Ramsey, Asher Hestad and Connor Lofy were selected 17th, 56th and 89th overall in the 2026 MLS SuperDraft, by Vancouver Whitecaps FC, the Colorado Rapids and Vancouver respectively, but returned to Washington for the 2026 season.

=== Players arriving ===
==== Incoming transfers ====
Incoming transfers
Name	Number	Pos.	Height	Year	Hometown	Previous School
Stockton Short	1	GK	6'3"	Graduate Student	Pleasant View, Utah	Utah Tech
Emmett Layman	9	FW	6'0"	Senior	Clinton, Washington	Point Loma Nazarene
Callum Lugton	10	FW	5'11"	Sophomore	Portland, Oregon	Syracuse
Wyatt Lewis	32	MF	6'2"	Graduate Student	St. Charles, Missouri	Notre Dame

==== Recruiting class ====
Name	Nat.	Hometown	High school
Shaun Brun; DF	USA	West Seattle, Washington	West Seattle HS
Nate Chandler; DF	USA	Pleasant Hill, California	De La Salle
Jordy Dierks; MF	USA	Lake Forest Park, Washington	Laurel Springs School
Anthony Garcia; FW	USA	Wenatchee, Washington	Wenatchee HS
Jake Goetting; FW	USA	Berkeley, California	Berkeley HS
Harper Mikolasy; DF	USA	Woodinville, Washington	Woodinville HS
Noah Newman; GK	USA	Seattle, Washington	Federal Way Internet Academy
Eashan Patel; DF	USA	Bellevue, Washington	Newport HS
Ibrahim Rashad; FW	USA	Oakland, California	Head-Royce School

== Squad ==
=== Roster ===
As of November 5, 2026

Note: Flags indicate national team as defined under FIFA eligibility rules; some limited exceptions apply. Players may hold more than one non-FIFA nationality.

No.	Pos.	Nation	Player
00	GK	USA	Kenny Pierpoint
0	GK	USA	Noah Newman
1	GK	USA	Stockton Short
2	DF	USA	Harper Mikolasy
3	DF	USA	Harrison Bertos
4	DF	USA	Egor Akulov
5	DF	USA	Asher Hestad
6	MF	USA	Zach Ramsey
7	MF	USA	Alex Hall
8	MF	USA	Clarens Dollin
9	FW	USA	Emmett Layman
10	FW	USA	Callum Lugton
11	FW	USA	Nick O'Brien
12	DF	USA	Carter Gay
13	MF	USA	Kevin Hernandez

No.	Pos.	Nation	Player
15	DF	USA	Nate Chandler
16	DF	USA	Zack Meier
17	MF	USA	Cameron Cruz
18	FW	USA	Ibrahim Rashad
19	FW	USA	Jake Goetting
20	MF	USA	Jordy Dierks
21	MF	USA	Osato Enabulele
22	DF	USA	Shaun Brun
26	MF	USA	Connor Lofy
27	FW	USA	Anthony Garcia
29	DF	USA	Eashan Patel
30	GK	USA	Jaeger Felton
32	MF	USA	Wyatt Lewis
33	MF	USA	Chad Sovde
44	DF	USA	Gabe Fernandez

=== Team management ===
Position	Staff
Head coach	Jamie Clark
Associate head coach	Mark Collings
Assistant coach	Richard Reece
Assistant coach	Ryan Fahey
Director of operations	Kaycie Bordeaux

== Schedule ==
Date Time, TV	Rank^{#}	Opponent^{#}	Result	Record	Site (Attendance) City, State
Regular season
August 20*; 7:00 p.m.	No. 1	No. 18 San Diego	L 1–2	0–1–0	Husky Soccer Stadium (1,801); Seattle, WA
August 23*; 7:00 p.m.	No. 1	at Gonzaga	W 4–0	1–1–0	Luger Field (1,168); Spokane, WA
August 27*; 8:00 p.m.	No. 11	No. 3 Portland	W 4–2	2–1–0	Husky Soccer Stadium (1,775); Seattle, WA
August 30*; 7:00 p.m.	No. 11	at No. 25 Oregon State	L 3–4	2–2–0	Paul Lorenz Field (996); Corvallis, OR
September 3*; 7:30 p.m.		Cal State Fullerton	T 2–2	2–2–1	Husky Soccer Stadium (1,435); Seattle, WA
September 5*; 7:30 p.m.		UC Davis	W 4–0	3–2–1	Husky Soccer Stadium (1,786); Seattle, WA
September 11; 7:30 p.m., B1G+		Penn State	W 4–2	4–2–1 (1–0–0)	Husky Soccer Stadium (2,498); Seattle, WA
September 18; 5:00 p.m., B1G+		at No. 2 Indiana	L 0–1	4–3–1 (1–1–0)	Bill Armstrong Stadium (3,504); Bloomington, IN
September 21; 4:00 p.m., BTN		at No. 3 Ohio State	W 4–0	5–3–1 (2–1–0)	Jesse Owens Memorial Stadium (756); Columbus, OH
September 25; 7:30 p.m., BTN		No. 22 Rutgers	W 4–1	6–3–1 (3–1–0)	Husky Soccer Stadium (1,783); Seattle, WA
October 2; 7:00 p.m., B1G+	No. 15	No. 19 Wisconsin	T 0–0	6–3–2 (3–1–1)	Husky Soccer Stadium (2,267); Seattle, WA
October 10; 7:00 p.m., B1G+	No. 14	Northwestern	W 2–1	7–3–2 (4–1–1)	Husky Soccer Stadium (2,385); Seattle, WA
October 14*; 7:00 p.m., B1G+	No. 13	Seattle U Fewing Cup	W 3–1	8–3–2	Husky Soccer Stadium (2,682); Seattle, WA
October 23; 4:00 p.m., B1G+	No. 7	at No. 6 Michigan State	T 1–1	8–3–3 (4–1–2)	DeMartin Stadium (1,154); East Lansing, MI
October 26; 4:00 p.m., BTN	No. 7	at Michigan	W 1–0	9–3–3 (5–1–2)	U-M Soccer Stadium (615); Ann Arbor, MI
October 30; 5:00 p.m., BTN	No. 7	No. 11 Maryland	W 2–1	10–3–3 (6–1–2)	Husky Soccer Stadium (1,412); Seattle, WA
November 4; 5:00 p.m., B1G+	No. 6	at No. 25 UCLA	L 0–1	10–4–3 (6–2–2)	Wallis Annenberg Stadium (691); Los Angeles, CA
Big Ten Tournament
November 11; 6:00 p.m., BTN	(2) No. 6	TBD (No. 3 Rutgers / No. 6 UCLA); Semifinals			Husky Soccer Stadium; Seattle, WA
*Non-conference game. ^{#}Rankings from United Soccer Coaches. (#) Tournament seedings in parentheses. All times are in Pacific.

== Goals record ==
Through November 4, 2026.

Rank	No.	Nat.	Po.	Name	Regular season	Big Ten Tournament	NCAA Tournament	Total
1	6	(United States)	MF	Zach Ramsey	18	0	0	18
2	21	(United States)	MF	Osato Enabulele	4	0	0	4
3	3	(United States)	DF	Harrison Bertos	3	0	0	3
3	7	(United States)	MF	Alex Hall	3	0	0	3
3	19	(United States)	FW	Jake Goetting	3	0	0	3
6	4	(United States)	DF	Egor Akulov	2	0	0	2
7	5	(United States)	DF	Asher Hestad	1	0	0	1
7	10	(United States)	FW	Callum Lugton	1	0	0	1
7	17	(United States)	MF	Cameron Cruz	1	0	0	1
7	26	(United States)	MF	Connor Lofy	1	0	0	1
7	32	(United States)	MF	Wyatt Lewis	1	0	0	1
Own goals					1	0	0	1
Total					39	0	0	39

== Disciplinary record ==
Through November 4, 2026. Does not include three cautions issued to the Washington bench.

Rank	No.	Nat.	Po.	Name	Regular Season			Big Ten Tournament			NCAA Tournament			Total		
Rank	No.	Nat.	Po.	Name	Yellow card	(yellow card) (yellow-red card)	Red card	Yellow card	(yellow card) (yellow-red card)	Red card	Yellow card	(yellow card) (yellow-red card)	Red card	Yellow card	(yellow card) (yellow-red card)	Red card
1	3	(United States)	DF	Harrison Bertos	5	1	0	0	0	0	0	0	0	5	1	0
2	16	(United States)	DF	Zack Meier	4	0	0	0	0	0	0	0	0	4	0	0
3	32	(United States)	MF	Wyatt Lewis	3	0	0	0	0	0	0	0	0	3	0	0
4	1	(United States)	GK	Stockton Short	0	0	1	0	0	0	0	0	0	0	0	1
5	13	(United States)	MF	Kevin Hernandez	2	0	0	0	0	0	0	0	0	2	0	0
5	26	(United States)	MF	Connor Lofy	2	0	0	0	0	0	0	0	0	2	0	0
7	4	(United States)	DF	Egor Akulov	1	0	0	0	0	0	0	0	0	1	0	0
7	5	(United States)	DF	Asher Hestad	1	0	0	0	0	0	0	0	0	1	0	0
7	10	(United States)	FW	Callum Lugton	1	0	0	0	0	0	0	0	0	1	0	0
7	17	(United States)	MF	Cameron Cruz	1	0	0	0	0	0	0	0	0	1	0	0
7	21	(United States)	MF	Osato Enabulele	1	0	0	0	0	0	0	0	0	1	0	0
Total					21	1	1	0	0	0	0	0	0	21	1	1

== Awards and honors ==
Recipient	Award	Date	Ref.
Harrison Bertos	TopDrawerSoccer Preseason Best XI – First Team	August 17	
Zach Ramsey	TopDrawerSoccer Preseason Best XI – Second Team	August 17	
Alex Hall	TopDrawerSoccer Preseason Best XI – Third Team	August 17	
Harrison Bertos	Hermann Trophy Preseason Watchlist	August 19	
Zach Ramsey	Big Ten Offensive Player of the Week	September 15	
Zach Ramsey	Big Ten Player of the Week	September 29	
Stockton Short	Big Ten Player of the Week	September 29	
Harrison Bertos	Hermann Trophy Midseason Watchlist	October 2	
Zach Ramsey	Hermann Trophy Midseason Watchlist	October 2	
Shaun Brun	Big Ten Freshman of the Week	October 6	
Egor Akulov	Big Ten Defensive Player of the Week	October 13	
Jake Goetting	Big Ten Freshman of the Week	October 27	
Jake Goetting	Big Ten Freshman of the Week	November 3	

== Rankings ==
Ranking movements Legend: ██ Increase in ranking ██ Decrease in ranking — = Not ranked RV = Received votes
	Week																
Poll	Pre	1	2	3	4	5	6	7	8	9	10	11	12	13	14	15	Final
United Soccer	1	11	RV	—	—	RV	15	14	13	7	7	6		Not released			
TopDrawer Soccer	1	1	5	8	24	24	—	—	25	24	19	13	7				
College Soccer News	1	6	10	15	16	23	21	19	21	17	16	12			Not released		
