= Wallis Annenberg Stadium =

Stadium in Los Angeles, California, United States

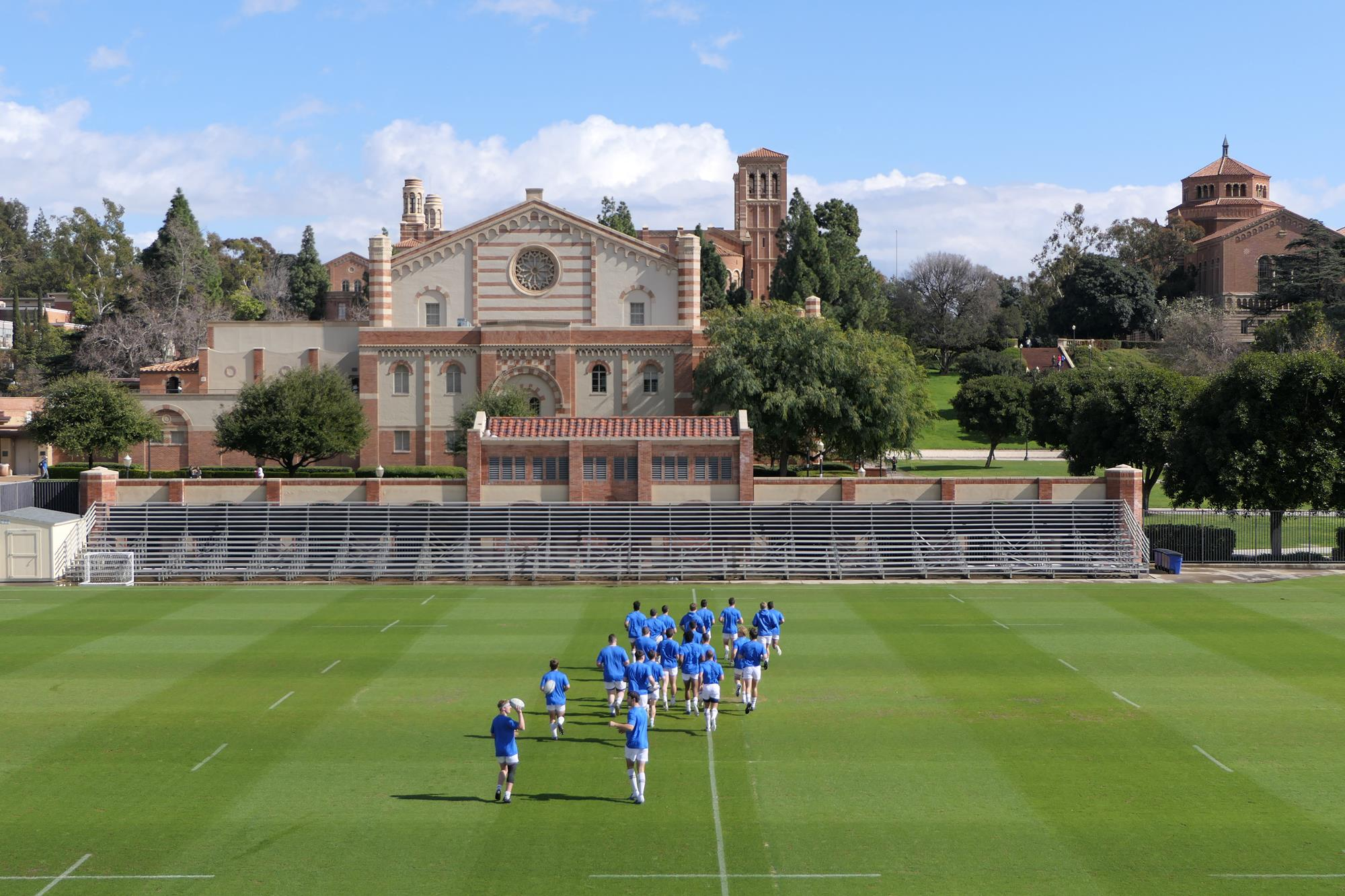
- The UCLA rugby team at the stadium in 2023
- Interactive map of Wallis Annenberg Stadium
- Location: Los Angeles, California
- Coordinates: 34°4′21″N 118°26′43″W
- Owner: University of California, LA
- Capacity: 2,145 (seated)
- Surface: Grass
- Scoreboard: Daktronics LED video board
- Current use: Soccer; Rugby

Construction
- Opened: August 17, 2018; 8 years ago

Tenants
- UCLA Bruins (NCAA) teams: men's soccer; women's soccer; rugby

Website
- uclabruins.com/stadium

Wallis Annenberg Stadium is a soccer-specific stadium located on the campus of University of California, Los Angeles. The stadium is home to the UCLA Bruins men's and women's soccer programs, and replaced Drake Stadium as the home venue for the two programs. The stadium is also home to the UCLA Bruins men's rugby team.

Construction on the stadium was funded with private donations, and began in the fall of 2016. Ahead of the 2018 men's and women's seasons, the stadium opened. The stadium is named for Wallis Annenberg of the Annenberg Foundation. A capacity crowd of 2,237 saw the Bruins defeating the Cal Golden Bears on September 24, 2022.

== Significant events ==
- November 9–18, 2018 – First, second and third round matches of the 2018 NCAA Division I Women's Soccer Tournament vs. San Jose State, Minnesota and NC State, respectively
- November 15–24, 2019 – First, second and third round matches of the 2019 NCAA Division I Women's Soccer Tournament vs. Lamar, Clemson and Wisconsin, respectively
- November 12, 2021 – First round match of the 2021 NCAA Division I Women's Soccer Tournament vs. UC Irvine
- November 18, 2021 – First round match of the 2021 NCAA Division I Men's Soccer Tournament vs. UC Santa Barbara
- October 30, 2022 – New attendance record of 2,446 was set on senior day at Wallis Annenberg Stadium with the UCLA women's soccer team ranking No. 1
- November 11-21, 2022 – First and second rounds, round of 16, and quarterfinal matches of the 2022 NCAA Division I Women's Soccer Tournament vs. Northern Arizona, UCF Knights, Northwestern and Virginia Cavaliers, respectively; the UCLA Bruins went on to win the national title
- November 15, 2025 – First round of the 2025 NCAA Division I women's soccer tournament vs. Pepperdine
- November 20, 2025 – First round of the 2025 NCAA Division I men's soccer tournament vs. Grand Canyon
