= 2017 American Athletic Conference men's soccer season =

- League: NCAA Division I
- Sport: Soccer
- Duration: August 25, 2017 – November 12, 2017
- Teams: 8

2018 MLS SuperDraft
- Top draft pick: Michael Nelson, SMU
- Picked by: Houston Dynamo, 20th overall

Regular Season
- Season champions: SMU
- Runners-up: UCF
- Top scorer: Matias Pyysalo, UCF (7 goals)

Tournament
- Champions: SMU
- Runners-up: UCF
- Finals MVP: Offensive: Emil Cuello, SMU; Defensive: Jordan Cano, SMU

AAC men's soccer seasons
- ← 2016 2018 →

2017 American Athletic Conference men's soccer standings
	Conf.					Overall
Team	W		L		T	W		L		T
No. 8 SMU ‡	5	–	1	–	1	17	–	3	–	1
UCF	4	–	2	–	1	8	–	6	–	2
Connecticut	4	–	3	–	0	8	–	8	–	2
Temple	4	–	3	–	0	9	–	8	–	1
South Florida	3	–	2	–	2	6	–	6	–	4
Tulsa	3	–	4	–	0	6	–	8	–	1
Memphis	2	–	3	–	2	4	–	8	–	4
Cincinnati	0	–	7	–	0	7	–	9	–	1
‡ – 2017 American Tournament champion + – Invited to the 2017 NCAA Division I Men's Soccer Championship; As of December 13, 2017; Rankings from United Soccer Coaches

The 2017 American Athletic Conference men's soccer season was the 5th season of men's varsity soccer in the conference. The season began on August 25 and concluded on November 12, 2017.

Defending regular season champions, SMU, retained their title, and won the 2017 American Athletic Conference Men's Soccer Tournament. The Mustangs were the conference's sole berth in the NCAA Tournament, where they reached the round of 16. There, they lost to North Carolina.

== Background ==
=== Head coaches ===
Team	Head coach	Previous job	Years at school	Overall record	Record at school	American record	NCAA Tournaments	NCAA College Cups	NCAA Titles
Cincinnati	Hylton Dayes	Wright State	18	229–229–62 (.500)	131–144–42 (.479)	7–27–4 (.237)	2	0	0
Connecticut	Ray Reid	Southern Connecticut	21	434–124–73 (.746)	288–107–58 (.700)	26–11–9 (.663)	16	2	1
Memphis	Richard Mulrooney	Memphis (asst.)	4	24–32–11 (.440)	24–32–11 (.440)	11–20–7 (.382)	0	0	0
SMU	Kevin Hudson	SMU (asst.)	3	38–14–6 (.707)	38–14–6 (.707)	14–5–3 (.705)	2	0	0
South Florida	Bob Butehorn	Florida Gulf Coast	1	135–100–31 (.566)	6–6–4 (.500)	3–3–2 (.500)	4	0	0
Temple	Dave MacWilliams	Philadelphia KiXX	18	140–161–34 (.469)	140–161–34 (.469)	12–19–7 (.408)	3	0	0
Tulsa	Tom McIntosh	Tulsa (asst.)	21	244–164–48 (.588)	244–164–48 (.588)	15–11–4 (.567)	10	0	0
UCF	Scott Calabrese	FIU	1	93–73–22 (.553)	8–6–2 (.563)	4–2–1 (.643)	3	0	0

== Preseason ==
=== Recruiting ===
National Rankings
Team	CSN	TDS
Cincinnati	NR	NR
Connecticut	NR	17
Memphis	NR	NR
SMU	NR	NR
South Florida	NR	31
Temple	NR	NR
Tulsa	NR	NR
UCF	NR	NR

=== Preseason poll ===
	Team ranking	First place votes	Raw points
1.	Connecticut	4	45
2.	Tulsa	1	43
3.	South Florida	2	34
4.	UCF	0	29
5.	SMU	1	27
6.	Temple	0	20
7.	Cincinnati	0	18
8.	Memphis	0	8

=== Preseason All-AAC Teams ===
Honor	Recipient
Preseason Offensive Player of the Year	(Finland) Matias Pyysalo, UCF
Preseason Defensive Player of the Year	(Denmark) Patrick Nielsen, Cincinnati
Preseason Goalkeeper of the Year	(United States) Michael Nelson, SMU

Preseason All-AAC Team

Note: Flags indicate national team as defined under FIFA eligibility rules; some limited exceptions apply. Players may hold more than one non-FIFA nationality.

No.	Pos.	Nation	Player
—	GK	USA	Michael Nelson (SMU)
—	DF	DEN	Patrick Nielsen (Cincinnati)
—	DF	USA	Jacob Hauser-Ramsey (Connecticut)
—	DF	USA	Dylan Greenberg (Connecticut)
—	DF	USA	Jordan Cano (SMU)
—	DF	USA	Zack Stavrou (Tulsa)
—	MF	USA	Jackson Morse (Memphis)

No.	Pos.	Nation	Player
—	MF	USA	Ricardo Gomez (South Florida)
—	MF	ESP	Mauro Cichero (SMU)
—	MF	FIN	Matias Pyysalo (UCF)
—	FW	SEN	Abdou Mbacke Thiam (Connecticut)
—	FW	USA	Garrett McLaughlin (SMU)
—	FW	FIN	Joonas Jokinen (Temple)
—	FW	USA	Juan Sánchez (Tulsa)

== Regular season ==
=== Rankings ===
Legend
	Increase in ranking
	Decrease in ranking
	Not ranked previous week
UCS	United Soccer Coaches poll
TDS	Top Drawer Soccer poll

		Pre	Wk 2	Wk 3	Wk 4	Wk 5	Wk 6	Wk 7	Wk 8	Wk 9	Wk 10	Wk 11	Wk 12	Wk 13	Wk 14	Wk 15	Wk 16	Final
Cincinnati	UCS																	
Cincinnati	TDS																	
Connecticut	UCS	24	RV							RV								
Connecticut	TDS	RV								25								
Memphis	UCS																	
Memphis	TDS																	
SMU	UCS		RV	RV	RV	19	RV	25	17	14	12	13	11	10	10	10	10	8
SMU	TDS								24	14	10	7	7	6	6	6	10	10
South Florida	UCS																	
South Florida	TDS																	
Temple	UCS																	
Temple	TDS																	
Tulsa	UCS				20													
Tulsa	TDS																	
UCF	UCS																	
UCF	TDS																	

Sources: TopDrawer Soccer, United Soccer Coaches

== Postseason ==
=== AAC Tournament ===
Semifinals
1	SMU	4
4	Temple	0
2	UCF	1
3	Connecticut	0

Finals
1	SMU	2
2	UCF	1

=== NCAA Tournament ===
Seed	Region	School	1st Round	2nd Round	3rd Round	Quarterfinals	Semifinals	Championship
—N/a	Chapel Hill	SMU	W, 2–0 vs. Central Arkansas – (Dallas)	W, 2–1 ^{2OT} vs. No. 14 Georgetown – (Washington, D.C.)	L, 0–2 vs. No. 3 North Carolina – (Cary)			

== Records against other conferences ==
Conference	Record
Atlantic 10	1–2–0
ACC	0–5–1
Atlantic Sun	5–1–1
Big East	3–4–2
Big South Conference	1–0–0
Big Ten	1–1–1
Big West	1–0–0
CAA	3–1–1
Conference USA	2–4–0
Horizon	4–2–1
Ivy	3–1–0
MAAC	1–3–0
Mid-American	1–2–1
Missouri Valley	2–1–0
Pac-12	1–1–0
Patriot	1–0–0
Southland	1–0–0
Summit	3–0–0
West Coast	3–0–0
WAC	0–0–1
Total	37–27–10

== Awards ==
=== Regular season awards ===
==== Players of the Week ====
Week	Offensive			Defensive			Goalkeeper		Rookie			Ref.
Week	Player	Position	Team	Player	Position	Team	Player	Team	Player	Position	Team	Ref.
August 28	Mauro Cichero	MF	SMU	Malik Suleman	MF	Cincinnati	Noah Lawrence	Cincinnati	Darryn Commissiong	MF	Cincinnati	
September 4	Garrett McLaughlin	FW	SMU	Nkosi Burgess	DF	Connecticut	Scott Levene	Connecticut	Adrian Billhardt	FW	South Florida	
September 11	Rollie Rocha	MF	Tulsa	Jonathan Dean	DF	UCF	Marcel Da Silva	Tulsa	Luke Biasi	MF	Memphis	
September 18	Sean Clarke	MF	Cincinnati	Jordan Cano	DF	SMU	Pearce Skinner	Cincinnati	Sean Clarke	MF	Cincinnati	
September 25	Abdou Mbacke Thiam	FW	Connecticut	Gustavo Vargas	DF	Tulsa	Scott Levene	Connecticut	Chris Mikus	MF	Memphis	
October 2	Alan Camacho Soto	FW	Temple	Jared Rice	DF	SMU	Scott Levene	Connecticut	Alan Camacho Soto	FW	Temple	
October 9	Ricardo Gomez	MF	South Florida	Jake Hauser-Ramsey	DF	Connecticut	Scott Levene	Connecticut	Jackson Brady	DF	Memphis	
October 16	Matias Pyysalo	MF	UCF	Jake Hauser-Ramsey	DF	Connecticut	Michael Nelson	SMU	Josh Burnett	MF	Connecticut	
October 23	Cal Jennings	FW	UCF	Jordan Cano	DF	SMU	Michael Nelson	SMU	Alan Camacho Soto	FW	Temple	
October 30	Matias Pyysalo	MF	UCF	Andreas Steinegar	DF	UCF	Christian Knight	South Florida	Brantley Bice	FW	Memphis	
November 2	Garrett McLaughlin	FW	SMU	Jordan Cano	DF	SMU	Michael Nelson	SMU	Chase Bromstedt	MF	Tulsa	

=== Postseason awards ===
==== All-AAC awards and teams ====
2017 AAC Men's Soccer Individual Awards
Award	Recipient(s)
Offensive Player of the Year	Matias Pyysalo, UCF
Defensive Player of the Year	Jordan Cano, SMU
Goalkeeper of the Year	Michael Nelson, SMU
Rookie of the Year	Adrian Billhardt, South Florida
Coach of the Year	Kevin Hudson, SMU
Academic Excellent Team	Memphis
Team Fair Play Award	UCF

2017 AAC Men's Soccer All-Conference Teams
First Team	Second Team	Rookie Team
Cal Jennings, F, So., UCF; Matias Pyysalo, M/F Sr., UCF; Yoni Sorokin, M, Fr., UCF; Jacob Hauser-Ramsey, B Jr., UConn; Abdou Mbacke Thiam, F Jr., UConn; Adrian Billhardt, F, Fr., USF; Ricardo Gomez, M Sr., USF; Jordan Cano, B Sr., SMU; Mauro Cichero, M Sr., SMU; Garrett McLaughlin, F, So., SMU; Michael Nelson, GK, R-Sr., SMU; Divin Fula Luzolo, B Sr., Temple	Hattabiou Barry, M, Fr., UCF; Louis Perez, M, Fr., UCF; Andreas Steineger, B Jr., UCF; David Sanz, M, So., Cincinnati; Dylan Greenberg, B, R-Sr., UConn; Scott Levene, GK, R-Sr., UConn; Ben Roberts, B, So., Memphis; David Zalzman, M Jr., Memphis; Jared Rice, B/M Sr., SMU; Alan Camacho Soto, F, Fr., Temple; Thibault Candia, F, So., Temple; Rollie Rocha, M Sr., Tulsa	Hattabiou Barry, M, UCF; Louis Perez, M, UCF; Yoni Sorokin, M, UCF; Josh Burnett, M, UConn; Blaise N’Gague, M, UConn; Adrian Billhardt, F, USF; Josue Monge, M, USF; Talen Maples, B, SMU; Alan Camacho Soto, F, Temple; Darri Sigthorsson, B, Temple; Joe Ruiz, M, Tulsa

==== All-Americans ====
===== College Soccer News =====
Three players in the conference were named All-Americans by CollegeSoccerNews.com.

- Mauro Cichero, SMU — 1st Team All-American
- Michael Nelson, SMU — 1st Team All-American
- Jordan Cano, SMU — 3rd Team All-American

===== United Soccer Coaches =====
Three players in the conference were named All-Americans by United Soccer Coaches.

- Mauro Cichero, SMU — 1st Team All-American
- Jordan Cano, SMU — 3rd Team All-American
- Garrett McLaughlin, SMU — 3rd Team All-American

== MLS SuperDraft ==
Two players from the conference were selected in the 2018 MLS SuperDraft. This included Michael Nelson and Mauro Cichero, both of SMU.

=== Total picks by school ===
Team	Round 1	Round 2	Round 3	Round 4	Total
Cincinnati	0	0	0	0	0
Connecticut	0	0	0	0	0
Memphis	0	0	0	0	0
SMU	1	1	0	0	2
South Florida	0	0	0	0	0
Temple	0	0	0	0	0
Tulsa	0	0	0	0	0
UCF	0	0	0	0	0

=== List of selections ===
Round	Pick #	MLS team	Player	Position	College	Other	Ref.
1	20	Houston Dynamo	(United States) Michael Nelson	GK	SMU		
2	29	FC Dallas	(Venezuela) Mauro Cichero	FW	SMU		

=== Homegrown contracts ===
Original MLS team	Player	Position	College	Notes	Ref.
FC Dallas	Jordan Cano	Defender	SMU	2017 AAC Defender of the Year	

== See also ==
- 2017 NCAA Division I men's soccer season
- 2017 American Athletic Conference women's soccer season
