= 2026 Atlantic Coast Conference men's soccer season =

- League: NCAA Division I
- Sport: Soccer
- Duration: August 20, 2026 – October 30, 2026
- Teams: 15

2027 MLS SuperDraft

Regular season
- Season champions: SMU
- Runners-up: Clemson
- Top scorer: Joschi Schelb (North Carolina); 15 goals

ACC tournament

ACC men's soccer seasons
- ← 2025 2027 →

2026 ACC men's soccer standings
	Conf.					Overall
Team	W		L		T	W		L		T
No. 1 SMU †	6	–	0	–	2	13	–	0	–	3
No. 5 Clemson	6	–	1	–	1	13	–	3	–	2
No. 20 Wake Forest	5	–	3	–	0	11	–	5	–	3
No. 13 Louisville	4	–	2	–	2	12	–	3	–	3
No. 21 Pittsburgh	4	–	2	–	2	9	–	4	–	4
Virginia Tech	4	–	2	–	2	8	–	6	–	3
No. 12 North Carolina	3	–	1	–	4	9	–	2	–	6
Notre Dame	4	–	4	–	0	7	–	5	–	4
Virginia	3	–	3	–	2	7	–	7	–	4
California	2	–	4	–	2	6	–	5	–	5
NC State	1	–	3	–	4	7	–	5	–	6
Stanford	1	–	4	–	3	9	–	5	–	3
Syracuse	1	–	5	–	2	8	–	7	–	3
Boston College	1	–	6	–	1	6	–	6	–	4
Duke	1	–	6	–	1	7	–	10	–	1
† – Conference champion ‡ – ACC tournament champion + – At-large invitation to the 2026 NCAA tournament; As of November 8, 2026; Rankings from United Soccer Coaches; Source:The ACC

The 2026 Atlantic Coast Conference men's soccer season is the 73rd season of men's varsity soccer in the conference. The season began on August 20. Conference play began in September and concluded on October 30. The 2026 ACC men's soccer tournament will be held from November 4 through November 15 at campus sites and at WakeMed Soccer Park in Cary, North Carolina.

Virginia were the defending regular season champions. The SMU Mustangs are the defending ACC tournament champions.

SMU won the regular season title with a 6–0–2 conference record, the program's first ACC regular season championship. The Mustangs finished the regular season 12–0–3 overall and were the only unbeaten team in the country. Clemson finished one point behind in second place with a 6–1–1 conference record. North Carolina's Joschi Schelb led the conference with 15 goals during the regular season.

== Teams ==
=== Stadiums and locations ===
Team	Stadium	Capacity
Boston College	Newton Campus Soccer Field	1,800
California	Edwards Stadium	22,000
Clemson	Riggs Field	6,500
Duke	Koskinen Stadium	7,000
Louisville	Lynn Stadium	5,300
NC State	Dail Soccer Field	3,000
Notre Dame	Alumni Stadium	2,500

Team	Stadium	Capacity
North Carolina	Dorrance Field	4,200
Pittsburgh	Ambrose Urbanic Field	735
SMU	Washburne Stadium	2,577
Stanford	Laird Q. Cagan Stadium	2,952
Syracuse	SU Soccer Stadium	1,500
Virginia	Klöckner Stadium	7,100
Virginia Tech	Thompson Field	2,500
Wake Forest	Spry Stadium	3,000

Note: Florida State, Georgia Tech and Miami (FL) are members of the Atlantic Coast Conference but do not sponsor men's soccer.

== Coaches ==
=== Head coaching records ===
Team	Head coach	Years at school	Overall record	Record at school	ACC record
Boston College	Francesco D'Agostino	1	0–0–0	0–0–0	0–0–0
California	Leonard Griffin	5	47–51–19	27–30–15	4–9–3
Clemson	Mike Noonan	17	415–205–91	191–90–88	69–45–21
Duke	John Kerr Jr.	19	251–167–61	171–108–48	68–59–26
Louisville	John Michael Hayden	8	57–49–19	57–49–19	20–30–10
North Carolina	Carlos Somoano	16	185–67–54	185–67–54	72–32–32
NC State	Marc Hubbard	3	258–56–50	26–8–9	7–4–5
Notre Dame	Chad Riley	9	131–74–43	80–51–26	29–27–10
Pittsburgh	Jay Vidovich	11	302–129–49	95–75–18	33–37–13
SMU	Kevin Hudson	12	126–49–27	126–49–27	7–4–5
Stanford	Jeremy Gunn	15	359–117–84	172–56–53	8–4–4
Syracuse	Ian McIntyre	17	255–171–85	148–107–53	28–48–25
Virginia	George Gelnovatch	31	389–156–76	389–156–76	113–77–41
Virginia Tech	Mike Brizendine	18	120–141–48	120–141–48	31–85–26
Wake Forest	Bobby Muuss	12	234–99–55	159–43–31	58–17–16

Notes

- Records shown are prior to the 2026 season
- Years at school includes the 2026 season
- ACC records include only years with current school.

== Preseason ==
=== Hermann Trophy ===
The Hermann Trophy preseason watchlist was released on August 19, 2026. Four ACC players were selected the preseason watchlist.

Player	Class	Position	School
Ransford Gyan	Junior	MF	Clemson
Noah Holmstrøm	Junior	DF	SMU
Joschi Schelb	Senior	FW	North Carolina
Ryan Zellefrow	Junior	MF	North Carolina

=== Preseason Poll ===
The pre-season poll and pre-season all conference teams were voted on by the league's 15 head coaches. The results of the poll were released on August 12, prior to the season starting. The full results of the poll are shown below:

Predicted finish	Team	Points (1st place)
1	NC State	183 (8)
2	Stanford	171 (2)
3	Virginia	161 (4)
4	SMU	146
5	Clemson	145 (1)
6	North Carolina	134
7	Duke	124
8	Notre Dame	100
9	Wake Forest	89
10	Syracuse	86
11	Pittsburgh	83
12	Virginia Tech	60
13	California	48
14	Louisville	29
15	Boston College	16

=== Preseason awards ===
Preseason All-ACC Watchlist

Position	Player	Class	School
Goalkeeper	Andrej Borak	Sophomore	Boston College
Defender	Ryan Quintos	Senior	Louisville
Defender	Niklas Sørensen	Junior	Pittsburgh
Defender	Dylan Groeneveld	Senior	Stanford
Defender	Sebastian Pop	Senior	Virginia
Midfielder	Florentino Junior	Freshman	California
Midfielder	Ransford Gyan	Junior	Clemson
Midfielder	Tyler Caton	Senior	NC State
Midfielder	Nolan Spicer	Senior	Notre Dame
Midfielder	Kelvin Da Costa	Junior	Syracuse
Midfielder	Yanis Belatrache	Senior	Virginia Tech
Midfielder	Jeffrey White	Senior	Wake Forest
Forward	Ulfur Bjornsson	Senior	Duke
Forward	Joschi Schelb	Senior	North Carolina
Forward	Stephan Soghomonian	Junior	SMU

== Regular season ==
Index to colors and formatting
ACC member won
ACC member lost
ACC member tied
ACC teams in **bold**

All times Eastern.

=== Week 1 (Aug. 18 – Aug. 24) ===
Date	Time (ET)	Visiting team	Home team	Site	Result	Attendance
August 20	5:00 p.m.	**Syracuse**	No. 24 UConn	Morrone Stadium • Storrs, CT	**W** 2–1	1,547
August 20	6:00 p.m.	IU Indy	**Louisville**	Lynn Stadium • Louisville, KY	**W** 2–1	312
August 20	7:00 p.m.	UCLA	**No. 11 Virginia**	Klöckner Stadium • Charlottesville, VA	**L** 1–2	1,306
August 20	7:00 p.m.	Merrimack	**Boston College**	Newton Campus Soccer Field • Newton, MA	**W** 4–0	460
August 20	7:00 p.m.	No. 7 Maryland	**Pittsburgh**	Ambrose Urbanic Field • Pittsburgh, PA	**L** 1–2	1,074
August 20	7:30 p.m.	**North Carolina**	No. 5 Georgetown	Shaw Field • Washington, D.C.	**T** 1–1	
August 20	7:30 p.m.	Coastal Carolina	**No. 2 NC State**	Dail Soccer Field • Raleigh, NC	**T** 0–0	3,147
August 20	7:30 p.m.	San Francisco	**Wake Forest**	Spry Stadium • Winston-Salem, NC	**W** 4–2	3,233
August 20	8:00 p.m.	Seton Hall	**Duke**	Koskinen Stadium • Durham, NC	**W** 2–1	674
August 20	8:00 p.m.	**Virginia Tech**	Ohio State	Jesse Owens Memorial Stadium • Columbus, OH	**L** 0–1	1,266
August 20	8:00 p.m.	No. 3 Furman	**Clemson**	Riggs Field • Clemson, SC	**W** 5–1	4,323
August 20	8:00 p.m.	**Notre Dame**	No. 22 Indiana	Bill Armstrong Stadium • Bloomington, IN	**L** 1–3	7,078
August 20	9:00 p.m.	Stetson	**No. 15 SMU**	Washburne Soccer and Track Stadium • Dallas, TX	**W** 3–1	786
August 20	10:30 p.m.	No. 21 Grand Canyon	**No. 9 Stanford**	Cagan Stadium • Stanford, CA	**W** 2–1	627
August 21	10:00 p.m.	**California**	No. 6 Portland	Merlo Field • Portland, OR	**T** 0–0	3,234
August 23	3:30 p.m.	Cal Baptist	**Duke**	Koskinen Stadium • Durham, NC	**W** 3–1	
August 23	4:00 p.m.	Howard	**Virginia Tech**	Thompson Field • Blacksburg, VA	**W** 7–0	768
August 23	5:00 p.m.	Queens	**No. 2 NC State**	Dail Soccer Field • Raleigh, NC	**W** 2–1	1,267
August 23	5:00 p.m.	Siena	**Boston College**	Newton Campus Soccer Field • Newton, MA	**W** 3–1	172
August 23	5:00 p.m.	New Hampshire	**Syracuse**	SU Soccer Stadium • Syracuse, NY	**L** 2–3	2,144
August 23	7:00 p.m.	East Tennessee State	**Clemson**	Riggs Field • Clemson, SC	**W** 2–0	4,110
August 23	7:00 p.m.	VCU	**Wake Forest**	Spry Stadium • Winston-Salem, NC	**T** 0–0	1,621
August 23	7:30 p.m.	Northwestern	**Notre Dame**	Alumni Stadium • South Bend, IN	**T** 0–0	714
August 23	10:00 p.m.	Denver	**No. 9 Stanford**	Cagan Stadium • Stanford, CA	**W** 3–1	914
August 24	6:00 p.m.	No. 16 High Point	**No. 11 Virginia**	Klöckner Stadium • Charlottesville, VA	**L** 2–3	1,300
August 24	7:00 p.m.	**North Carolina**	Memphis	Mike Rose Soccer Complex • Memphis, TN	**L** 2–3	875
August 24	7:00 p.m.	Bucknell	**Pittsburgh**	Ambrose Urbanic Field • Pittsburgh, PA	**W** 3–1	521
August 24	7:30 p.m.	**Louisville**	Kentucky	Bell Soccer Complex • Lexington, KY	**W** 3–2	2,407
August 24	8:00 p.m.	**No. 15 SMU**	No. 4 Saint Louis	Hermann Stadium • St. Louis, MO	**W** 4–0	1,233

Players of the Week

Offensive		Defensive	
Player	Team	Player	Team
Xander Sevian	Clemson	Beau Morrison	California

=== Week 2 (Aug. 25 – Aug. 31) ===
Date	Time (ET)	Visiting team	Home team	Site	Result	Attendance
August 27	6:00 p.m.	Lipscomb	**Louisville**	Lynn Stadium • Louisville, KY	**W** 3–1	412
August 27	7:00 p.m.	No. 2 San Diego	**No. 1 Stanford**	Cagan Stadium • Stanford, CA	**W** 1–0	1,118
August 27	7:00 p.m.	**No. 20 NC State**	FIU	FIU Soccer Stadium • Miami, FL	**L** 1–2	426
August 27	7:00 p.m.	Furman	**No. 19 Duke**	Koskinen Stadium • Durham, NC	**L** 3–4	507
August 27	10:30 p.m.	**California**	Santa Clara	Stevens Stadium • Santa Clara, CA	**W** 1–0	535
August 28	6:00 p.m.	American	**Virginia**	Klöckner Stadium • Charlottesville, VA	**W** 4–0	1,146
August 28	6:00 p.m.	Kentucky	**Virginia Tech**	Thompson Field • Blacksburg, VA	**W** 3–0	473
August 28	7:00 p.m.	Loyola	**Syracuse**	SU Soccer Stadium • Syracuse, NY	**W** 2–0	1,941
August 28	7:00 p.m.	**Pittsburgh**	Penn State	Jeffrey Field • State College, PA	**W** 2–1	1,502
August 28	7:00 p.m.	Dartmouth	**Boston College**	Newton Campus Soccer Field • Newton, MA	**W** 2–1	803
August 28	7:00 p.m.	**No. 19 Clemson**	South Carolina	Stone Stadium • Columbia, SC	**L** 2–3	7,671
August 28	7:00 p.m.	**Wake Forest**	No. 10 Akron	FirstEnergy Stadium • Akron, OH	**L** 0–1	2,260
August 28	7:30 p.m.	No. 8 Saint Louis	**Notre Dame**	Alumni Stadium • South Bend, IN	**T** 1–1	929
August 28	7:30 p.m.	VCU	**North Carolina**	Dorrance Field • Chapel Hill, NC	**W** 1–0	2,032
August 28	8:00 p.m.	Loyola Marymount	**No. 5 SMU**	Washburne Soccer and Track Stadium • Dallas, TX	**W** 2–0	956
August 30	6:00 p.m.	No. 6 Georgetown	**No. 19 Duke**	Koskinen Stadium • Durham, NC	**L** 0–3	1,005
August 30	7:00 p.m.	**No. 20 NC State**	Florida Atlantic	FAU Soccer Stadium • Boca Raton, FL	**T** 3–3	392
August 30	10:00 p.m.	UC Davis	**No. 1 Stanford**	Cagan Stadium • Stanford, CA	**W** 2–1	924
August 31	6:00 p.m.	Florida Gulf Coast	**Virginia**	Klöckner Stadium • Charlottesville, VA	**L** 1–2	309
August 31	6:00 p.m.	**Wake Forest**	Bowling Green	Mickey Cochrane Stadium • Bowling Green, OH	**W** 1–0	536
August 31	7:00 p.m.	No. 14 Indiana	**Louisville**	Lynn Stadium • Louisville, KY	**T** 1–1	1,520
August 31	7:00 p.m.	Iona	**Syracuse**	SU Soccer Stadium • Syracuse, NY	**W** 4–0	1,244
August 31	7:30 p.m.	Harvard	**Notre Dame**	Alumni Stadium • South Bend, IN	**W** 3–1	357
August 31	8:00 p.m.	Houston Christian	**No. 5 SMU**	Washburne Soccer and Track Stadium • Dallas, TX	**W** 6–0	687

Players of the Week

Offensive		Defensive	
Player	Team	Player	Team
Giacomo Zizza	Louisville	Jaylinn Mitchell	SMU

=== Week 3 (Sep. 1 – Sep. 7) ===
Date	Time (ET)	Visiting team	Home team	Site	Result	Attendance
September 1	7:00 p.m.	**No. 18 Clemson**	UCF	UCF Soccer and Track Stadium • Orlando, FL	**W** 4–1	967
September 1	8:00 p.m.	No. 12 UCLA	**California**	Edwards Stadium • Berkeley, CA	**T** 2–2	433
September 3	7:00 p.m.	**Pittsburgh**	No. 8 Michigan State	DeMartin Soccer Complex • East Lansing, MI	**T** 0–0	1,532
September 3	8:00 p.m.	Wright State	**No. 22 Louisville**	Lynn Stadium • Louisville, KY	**W** 3–0	210
September 4	6:00 p.m.	**Boston College**	**Virginia**	Klöckner Stadium • Charlottesville, VA	**UVA** 2–0	460
September 4	7:00 p.m.	**No. 18 Clemson**	**Syracuse**	SU Soccer Stadium • Syracuse, NY	**CLEM** 1–0	2,531
September 4	8:00 p.m.	Kansas City	**No. 3 SMU**	Washburne Soccer and Track Stadium • Dallas, TX	**T** 1–1	1,087
September 4	10:00 p.m.	**No. 1 Stanford**	San Jose State	Spartan Soccer Complex • San Jose, CA	**W** 1–0	1,345
September 5	6:00 p.m.	**Virginia Tech**	**NC State**	Dail Soccer Field • Raleigh, NC	**T** 1–1	1,381
September 5	7:00 p.m.	**Duke**	**Wake Forest**	Spry Stadium • Winston-Salem, NC	**WAKE** 6–1	2,700
September 6	3:30 p.m.	Michigan	**Notre Dame**	Alumni Stadium • South Bend, IN	**W** 2–1	1,004
September 6	7:00 p.m.	**North Carolina**	**California**	Edwards Stadium • Berkeley, CA	**T** 2–2	607
September 7	7:00 p.m.	Penn	**Pittsburgh**	Ambrose Urbanic Field • Pittsburgh, PA	**W** 1–0	508
September 7	7:00 p.m.	Cal State Northridge	**No. 1 Stanford**	Cagan Stadium • Stanford, CA	**W** 4–0	1,418
September 7	8:00 p.m.	Incarnate Word	**No. 3 SMU**	Washburne Soccer and Track Stadium • Dallas, TX	**W** 3–0	627

Players of the Week

Offensive		Defensive	
Player	Team	Player	Team
Ransford Gyan	Clemson	Blake Kelly	Notre Dame

=== Week 4 (Sep. 8 – Sep. 14) ===
Date	Time (ET)	Visiting team	Home team	Site	Result	Attendance
September 8	4:30 p.m.	St. Bonaventure	**Boston College**	Newton Campus Soccer Field • Newton, MA	**T** 2–2	121
September 8	6:00 p.m.	No. 23т Oregon State	**Virginia**	Klöckner Stadium • Charlottesville, VA	**T** 1–1	641
September 8	7:00 p.m.	USC Upstate	**Wake Forest**	Spry Stadium • Winston-Salem, NC	**W** 3–0	1,023
September 8	8:00 p.m.	**No. 21 Louisville**	Evansville	McCutchan Stadium • Evansville, IN	**W** 1–0	627
September 9	6:00 p.m.	East Tennessee State	**Virginia Tech**	Thompson Field • Blacksburg, VA	**L** 1–3	407
September 9	7:00 p.m.	St. John's	**Syracuse**	SU Soccer Stadium • Syracuse, NY	**W** 5–0	203
September 9	7:00 p.m.	Cal State Fullerton	**California**	Edwards Stadium • Berkeley, CA	**W** 1–0	101
September 10	6:00 p.m.	**Duke**	**NC State**	Dail Soccer Field • Raleigh, NC	**NCST** 3–1	2,244
September 11	7:00 p.m.	**Notre Dame**	**No. 17 Clemson**	Riggs Field • Clemson, SC	**ND** 1–0	6,143
September 11	7:00 p.m.	**No. 7 SMU**	**Pittsburgh**	Ambrose Urbanic Field • Pittsburgh, PA	**SMU** 3–1	681
September 11	7:00 p.m.	**No. 1 Stanford**	**North Carolina**	Dorrance Field • Chapel Hill, NC	**T** 2–2	2,031
September 12	6:00 p.m.	Liberty	**Virginia**	Klöckner Stadium • Charlottesville, VA	**W** 3–2	447
September 12	7:00 p.m.	**Syracuse**	**Boston College**	Newton Campus Soccer Field • Newton, MA	**BC** 2–0	695
September 13	3:00 p.m.	**California**	**No. 21 Louisville**	Lynn Stadium • Louisville, KY	**LOU** 3–2	335
September 13	6:00 p.m.	**Wake Forest**	**Virginia Tech**	Thompson Field • Blacksburg, VA	**VT** 2–1	831

Players of the Week

Offensive		Defensive	
Player	Team	Player	Team
Jayden Fitzgerald Boes	Stanford	Vlad Walent	Notre Dame

=== Week 5 (Sep. 15 – Sep. 21) ===
Date	Time (ET)	Visiting team	Home team	Site	Result	Attendance
September 15	4:30 p.m.	New Haven	**Boston College**	Newton Campus Soccer Field • Newton, MA	**W** 2–1	114
September 15	6:00 p.m.	No. 23 UNC Wilmington	**NC State**	Dail Soccer Field • Raleigh, NC	**W** 1–0	693
September 15	7:00 p.m.	American	**North Carolina**	Dorrance Field • Chapel Hill, NC	**W** 2–0	1,070
September 15	7:00 p.m.	No. 17 Cornell	**Pittsburgh**	Ambrose Urbanic Field • Pittsburgh, PA	**W** 2–0	396
September 15	7:00 p.m.	**Syracuse**	Colgate	Beyer-Small '76 Field • Hamilton, NY	**W** 3–0	503
September 15	7:00 p.m.	North Florida	**No. 21 Clemson**	Riggs Field • Clemson, SC	**W** 5–1	2,059
September 15	7:00 p.m.	Detroit Mercy	**No. 20 Notre Dame**	Alumni Stadium • South Bend, IN	**W** 4–0	0
September 15	7:00 p.m.	Queens	**Duke**	Koskinen Stadium • Durham, NC	**W** 2–0	317
September 15	10:00 p.m.	Santa Clara	**No. 1 Stanford**	Cagan Stadium • Stanford, CA	**W** 1–0	947
September 16	10:00 p.m.	**California**	San Francisco	Negoesco Stadium • San Francisco, CA	**L** 2–3	1,257
September 18	6:00 p.m.	**Boston College**	**No. 15 Louisville**	Lynn Stadium • Louisville, KY	**T** 3–3	684
September 18	7:00 p.m.	**Virginia Tech**	**Duke**	Koskinen Stadium • Durham, NC	**VT** 4–2	908
September 18	9:00 p.m.	**NC State**	**No. 5 SMU**	Washburne Soccer and Track Stadium • Dallas, TX	**SMU** 1–0	2,097
September 19	7:00 p.m.	**No. 21 Clemson**	**North Carolina**	Dorrance Field • Chapel Hill, NC	**CLEM** 2–1	1,693
September 19	7:00 p.m.	**Virginia**	**Wake Forest**	Spry Stadium • Winston-Salem, NC	**WAKE** 3–2	2,100
September 19	7:00 p.m.	Le Moyne	**Syracuse**	SU Soccer Stadium • Syracuse, NY	**W** 2–0	2,064
September 20	6:00 p.m.	**Pittsburgh**	**California**	Edwards Stadium • Berkeley, CA	**PITT** 2–1	212
September 20	10:00 p.m.	**No. 20 Notre Dame**	**No. 1 Stanford**	Cagan Stadium • Stanford, CA	**ND** 3–1	1,637
September 21	6:00 p.m.	Belmont	**No. 15 Louisville**	Lynn Stadium • Louisville, KY	**W** 3–0	252

Players of the Week

Offensive		Defensive	
Player	Team	Player	Team
Alex Perez	Virginia Tech	Blake Kelly	Notre Dame
Alex Perez	Virginia Tech	Enzo Panozzo	SMU

=== Week 6 (Sep. 22 – Sep. 28) ===
Date	Time (ET)	Visiting team	Home team	Site	Result	Attendance
September 22	6:00 p.m.	Queens	**Virginia Tech**	Thompson Field • Blacksburg, VA	**W** 3–0	482
September 22	7:00 p.m.	Howard	**Duke**	Koskinen Stadium • Durham, NC	**W** 3–1	185
September 25	7:00 p.m.	**Wake Forest**	**NC State**	Dail Soccer Field • Raleigh, NC	**WAKE** 2–1	2,073
September 25	7:00 p.m.	**Boston College**	**No. 14 Clemson**	Riggs Field • Clemson, SC	**CLEM** 4–0	1,848
September 25	7:00 p.m.	Elon	**Duke**	Koskinen Stadium • Durham, NC	**L** 0–1	563
September 25	7:00 p.m.	**Syracuse**	**No. 10 Notre Dame**	Alumni Stadium • South Bend, IN	**CUSE** 1–0	1,237
September 25	7:00 p.m.	**No. 16 Louisville**	**No. 20 Pittsburgh**	Ambrose Urbanic Field • Pittsburgh, PA	**PITT** 1–0	753
September 25	10:00 p.m.	**California**	Pacific	Knoles Field • Stockton, CA	**W** 3–0	971
September 25	10:00 p.m.	**Virginia**	**No. 6 Stanford**	Cagan Stadium • Stanford, CA	**UVA** 3–2	1,672
September 26	7:00 p.m.	Lipscomb	**North Carolina**	Dorrance Field • Chapel Hill, NC	**W** 3–1	2,065
September 27	4:00 p.m.	**No. 3 SMU**	**Virginia Tech**	Thompson Field • Blacksburg, VA	**SMU** 3–0	930

Players of the Week

Offensive		Defensive	
Player	Team	Player	Team
Ransford Gyan (2)	Clemson	Enzo Panozzo (2)	SMU

=== Week 7 (Sep. 29 – Oct. 5) ===
Date	Time (ET)	Visiting team	Home team	Site	Result	Attendance
September 29	7:00 p.m.	Wofford	**No. 9 Clemson**	Riggs Field • Clemson, SC	**W** 4–1	1,918
September 29	7:00 p.m.	Loyola Chicago	**Wake Forest**	Spry Stadium • Winston-Salem, NC	**W** 3–0	1,000
September 29	8:00 p.m.	**No. 13 Notre Dame**	UIC	Flames Field • Chicago, IL	**T** 1–1	611
September 30	7:00 p.m.	West Florida	**North Carolina**	Dorrance Field • Chapel Hill, NC	**W** 2–0	683
October 2	6:00 p.m.	**NC State**	**No. 17 Louisville**	Lynn Stadium • Louisville, KY	**LOU** 2–1	456
October 2	7:00 p.m.	No. 20 UNC Wilmington	**No. 9 Clemson**	Riggs Field • Clemson, SC	**W** 4–1	2,031
October 2	7:00 p.m.	**No. 10 Pittsburgh**	**Syracuse**	SU Soccer Stadium • Syracuse, NY	**T** 1–1	1,631
October 2	7:00 p.m.	**No. 1 SMU**	**Wake Forest**	Spry Stadium • Winston-Salem, NC	**SMU** 2–0	3,515
October 2	7:00 p.m.	**No. 14 Stanford**	**Duke**	Koskinen Stadium • Durham, NC	**STAN** 3–2	887
October 2	8:00 p.m.	**Virginia Tech**	**Virginia**	Klöckner Stadium • Charlottesville, VA	**VT** 2–1	1,694
October 3	3:00 p.m.	**North Carolina**	**Boston College**	Newton Campus Soccer Field • Newton, MA	**UNC** 3–1	784
October 3	3:00 p.m.	**California**	**No. 13 Notre Dame**	Alumni Stadium • South Bend, IN	**CAL** 2–0	1,147

Players of the Week

Offensive		Defensive	
Player	Team	Player	Team
Joschi Schelb	North Carolina	Diego Dauzier	Virginia Tech

=== Week 8 (Oct. 6 – Oct. 12) ===
Date	Time (ET)	Visiting team	Home team	Site	Result	Attendance
October 6	6:00 p.m.	DePaul	**No. 11 Louisville**	Lynn Stadium • Louisville, KY	**W** 4–1	284
October 6	6:00 p.m.	Queens	**Virginia**	Klöckner Stadium • Charlottesville, VA	**W** 4–3	332
October 6	6:00 p.m.	Longwood	**Virginia Tech**	Thompson Field • Blacksburg, VA	**W** 3–1	317
October 6	7:00 p.m.	Wofford	**Duke**	Koskinen Stadium • Durham, NC	**W** 3–0	253
October 6	7:00 p.m.	**No. 25т Syracuse**	No. 12 Akron	FirstEnergy Stadium • Akron, OH	**L** 1–2	874
October 6	7:00 p.m.	Georgia Southern	**No. 5 Clemson**	Riggs Field • Clemson, SC	**T** 2–2	1,462
October 7	6:00 p.m.	**NC State**	UNC Greensboro	UNCG Soccer Stadium • Greensboro, NC	**L** 1–3	1,582
October 9	6:00 p.m.	**California**	**Virginia**	Klöckner Stadium • Charlottesville, VA	**UVA** 1–0	1,406
October 9	7:00 p.m.	**Virginia Tech**	**No. 10 Pittsburgh**	Ambrose Urbanic Field • Pittsburgh, PA	**PITT** 3–0	775
October 9	7:00 p.m.	**Wake Forest**	**Boston College**	Newton Campus Soccer Field • Newton, MA	**WAKE** 2–1	681
October 10	7:00 p.m.	**Duke**	**No. 1 SMU**	Washburne Soccer and Track Stadium • Dallas, TX	**SMU** 6–0	2,243
October 10	7:00 p.m.	**Notre Dame**	**North Carolina**	Dorrance Field • Chapel Hill, NC	**UNC** 7–1	2,313
October 10	7:00 p.m.	**No. 11 Louisville**	**No. 25т Syracuse**	SU Soccer Stadium • Syracuse, NY	**LOU** 1–0	1,267
October 11	6:00 p.m.	No. 4 Kansas City	**NC State**	Dail Soccer Field • Raleigh, NC	**W** 3–0	1,038
October 11	9:00 p.m.	**No. 5 Clemson**	**No. 13 Stanford**	Cagan Stadium • Stanford, CA	**CLEM** 3–2	1,989

Players of the Week

Offensive		Defensive	
Player	Team	Player	Team
Joschi Schelb (2)	North Carolina	Nathaniel Abraham	Louisville
Joschi Schelb (2)	North Carolina	Gavin Wetzel	Pittsburgh

=== Week 9 (Oct. 13 – Oct. 19) ===
Date	Time (ET)	Visiting team	Home team	Site	Result	Attendance
October 13	6:00 p.m.	Gardner–Webb	**Virginia**	Klöckner Stadium • Charlottesville, VA	**W** 4–0	436
October 13	7:00 p.m.	UNC Asheville	**No. 23 Wake Forest**	Spry Stadium • Winston-Salem, NC	**W** 3–1	939
October 13	7:00 p.m.	Greensboro College	**Duke**	Koskinen Stadium • Durham, NC	**W** 2–0	374
October 13	7:00 p.m.	**Boston College**	Boston University	Nickerson Field • Boston, MA	**T** 2–2	563
October 13	7:00 p.m.	Duquesne	**No. 7 Pittsburgh**	Ambrose Urbanic Field • Pittsburgh, PA	**W** 2–1	600
October 14	6:00 p.m.	Mercer	**NC State**	Dail Soccer Field • Raleigh, NC	**W** 3–0	796
October 14	6:30 p.m.	Saint Mary's	**California**	Edwards Stadium • Berkeley, CA	**W** 4–0	178
October 16	6:00 p.m.	**No. 25 Stanford**	**No. 1 SMU**	Washburne Soccer and Track Stadium • Dallas, TX	**T** 0–0	2,056
October 16	6:00 p.m.	**Virginia Tech**	Furman	Stone III Stadium • Greenville, SC	**L** 2–3	402
October 16	7:00 p.m.	**Virginia**	**Duke**	Koskinen Stadium • Durham, NC	**DUKE** 3–0	1,131
October 16	7:00 p.m.	**North Carolina**	**No. 7 Pittsburgh**	Ambrose Urbanic Field • Pittsburgh, PA	**UNC** 1–0	667
October 16	7:30 p.m.	**No. 8 Louisville**	**No. 4 Clemson**	Riggs Field • Clemson, SC	**CLEM** 3–0	5,135
October 17	6:00 p.m.	**Boston College**	**Notre Dame**	Alumni Stadium • South Bend, IN	**ND** 2–0	564
October 17	7:00 p.m.	**Syracuse**	**No. 23 Wake Forest**	Spry Stadium • Winston-Salem, NC	**WAKE** 2–0	2,296
October 18	5:00 p.m.	**NC State**	**California**	Edwards Stadium • Berkeley, CA	**T** 2–2	333
October 19	7:00 p.m.	No. 3 Georgetown	**No. 7 Pittsburgh**	Ambrose Urbanic Field • Pittsburgh, PA	**L** 1–6	541

Players of the Week

Offensive		Defensive	
Player	Team	Player	Team
Jack Ottley	Duke	Alan Rutkowski	North Carolina
Aidan Payne	NC State	Alan Rutkowski	North Carolina

=== Week 10 (Oct. 20 – Oct. 26) ===
Date	Time (ET)	Visiting team	Home team	Site	Result	Attendance
October 20	7:00 p.m.	Central Arkansas	**No. 1 SMU**	Washburne Soccer and Track Stadium • Dallas, TX	**W** 5–2	723
October 20	7:00 p.m.	Queens	**No. 15 Wake Forest**	Spry Stadium • Winston-Salem, NC	**W** 5–0	840
October 21	6:00 p.m.	Winthrop	**Virginia Tech**	Thompson Field • Blacksburg, VA	**T** 1–1	369
October 21	6:00 p.m.	Spalding	**No. 10 Louisville**	Lynn Stadium • Louisville, KY	**W** 5–0	538
October 23	7:00 p.m.	**No. 17 Pittsburgh**	**Boston College**	Newton Campus Soccer Field • Newton, MA	**PITT** 2–0	473
October 23	8:00 p.m.	**No. 16 North Carolina**	**Duke**	Koskinen Stadium • Durham, NC	**T** 2–2	2,307
October 24	1:00 p.m.	**Virginia**	**Syracuse**	SU Soccer Stadium • Syracuse, NY	**T** 1–1	1,632
October 24	6:00 p.m.	**No. 1 SMU**	**California**	Edwards Stadium • Berkeley, CA	**SMU** 2–0	514
October 24	6:00 p.m.	**Stanford**	**NC State**	Dail Soccer Field • Raleigh, NC	**T** 1–1	1,354
October 24	7:00 p.m.	**No. 15 Wake Forest**	Elon	Rudd Field • Elon, NC	**T** 0–0	638
October 25	2:00 p.m.	**No. 3 Clemson**	**Virginia Tech**	Thompson Field • Blacksburg, VA	**T** 2–2	831
October 25	3:00 p.m.	**Notre Dame**	**No. 10 Louisville**	Lynn Stadium • Louisville, KY	**LOU** 2–1	813

Players of the Week

Offensive		Defensive	
Player	Team	Player	Team
Cooper Olson	Louisville	Ryan Clanton-Pimentel	SMU

=== Week 11 (Oct. 27 – Nov. 2) ===
Date	Time (ET)	Visiting team	Home team	Site	Result	Attendance
October 27	6:00 p.m.	William & Mary	No. 15 North Carolina	Dorrance Field • Chapel Hill, NC	**W** 6–0	563
October 28	3:30 p.m.	American International	Boston College	Newton Campus Soccer Field • Newton, MA	**W** 5–1	88
October 30	5:00 p.m.	**Syracuse**	Virginia Tech	Thompson Field • Blacksburg, VA	**VT** 2–1	622
October 30	6:00 p.m.	**No. 18 Pittsburgh**	Virginia	Klöckner Stadium • Charlottesville, VA	**T** 0–0	947
October 30	7:00 p.m.	**No. 10 Louisville**	No. 1 SMU	Washburne Soccer and Track Stadium • Dallas, TX	**T** 1–1	1,985
October 30	7:00 p.m.	**Duke**	Notre Dame	Alumni Stadium • South Bend, IN	**ND** 3–0	579
October 30	7:00 p.m.	**NC State**	No. 15 North Carolina	Dorrance Field • Chapel Hill, NC	**T** 1–1	2,116
October 30	7:00 p.m.	**No. 16 Wake Forest**	No. 3 Clemson	Riggs Field • Clemson, SC	**CLEM** 2–1	4,389
October 30	9:00 p.m.	**California**	Stanford	Cagan Stadium • Stanford, CA	**CAL** 3–1	2,103

Players of the Week

Offensive		Defensive	
Player	Team	Player	Team
Lucca Guimaraes	California	D'Andre Pickett	California

== Rankings ==
Legend
Increase in ranking
Decrease in ranking
Not ranked previous week

		Pre	Wk 1	Wk 2	Wk 3	Wk 4	Wk 5	Wk 6	Wk 7	Wk 8	Wk 9	Wk 10	Wk 11	Wk 12	Wk 13	Wk 14	Wk 15	Final
Boston College	USC	—	—	RV	—	—	RV	—	—	—	—	—	—	—	Not released			
Boston College	TDS	—	—	—	—	—	23	23	—	—	—	—	—	—				
Boston College	CSN	—	—	RV	—	—	RV	—	—	—	—	—	—		Not released			
California	USC	—	—	—	—	—	—	—	—	—	—	—	—	—	Not released			
California	TDS	—	—	—	—	—	—	—	—	—	—	—	—	—				
California	CSN	—	—	—	—	—	—	—	—	—	—	—	—		Not released			
Clemson	USC	—	16	18	17	21	14	9	5	4	3	3	3	5	Not released			
Clemson	TDS	—	3	9	6	19	8	4	4	4	3	5	3	5				
Clemson	CSN	RV	13	15	13	19	17	9	7	4	3	3	3		Not released			
Duke	USC	RV	19	—	—	—	—	—	—	—	—	—	—	—	Not released			
Duke	TDS	15	16	22	—	—	—	—	—	—	—	—	—	—				
Duke	CSN	25	17	RV	—	—	—	—	—	—	—	—	—		Not released			
Louisville	USC	—	—	22	21	15	16	17	11	8	10	10	8	13	Not released			
Louisville	TDS	—	—	—	14	10	15	17	17	13	13	8	8	16				
Louisville	CSN	—	RV	23	23	14	14	18	14	12	12	10	10		Not released			
North Carolina	USC	RV	—	—	—	—	—	—	—	RV	16	15	17	12	Not released			
North Carolina	TDS	25	20	24	—	—	—	—	—	21	8	11	12	10				
North Carolina	CSN	20	22	RV	RV	RV	—	—	RV	RV	23	19	18		Not released			
NC State	USC	2	20	—	—	—	—	—	—	—	—	—	—	—	Not released			
NC State	TDS	6	12	—	—	—	—	—	—	—	—	—	—	—				
NC State	CSN	2	5	19	—	—	—	—	—	—	—	—	—		Not released			
Notre Dame	USC	—	—	—	—	20	10	13	—	—	—	—	—	—	Not released			
Notre Dame	TDS	—	—	—	—	18	5	10	—	—	—	—	—	—				
Notre Dame	CSN	—	—	—	—	RV	16	14	18	—	—	—	—		Not released			
Pittsburgh	USC	—	—	—	—	—	20	10	10	7	17	18	20	21	Not released			
Pittsburgh	TDS	—	—	—	—	—	22	8	6	5	9	19	24	25				
Pittsburgh	CSN	—	—	—	RV	—	RV	17	11	8	8	11	13		Not released			
SMU	USC	15	5	3	7	5	3	1	1	1	1	1	2	1	Not released			
SMU	TDS	14	15	3	8	4	3	1	1	1	1	1	2	2				
SMU	CSN	14	9	4	4	2	3	1	1	1	1	2	2		Not released			
Stanford	USC	9	1	1	1	1	6	14	13	25	RV	RV	—	—	Not released			
Stanford	TDS	10	8	1	1	3	10	16	10	10	10	16	—	—				
Stanford	CSN	8	1	1	1	1	1	8	13	15	20	21	RV		Not released			
Syracuse	USC	—	—	—	—	—	—	RV	25т	—	—	—	—	—	Not released			
Syracuse	TDS	—	—	—	—	—	—	19	14	—	—	—	—	—				
Syracuse	CSN	—	—	—	—	—	—	RV	RV	—	—	—	—		Not released			
Virginia	USC	11	—	—	—	—	—	—	—	—	—	—	—	—	Not released			
Virginia	TDS	16	25	—	—	—	—	—	—	—	—	—	—	—				
Virginia	CSN	9	20	RV	—	—	—	—	—	—	—	—	—		Not released			
Virginia Tech	USC	—	—	—	—	—	—	—	RV	—	—	—	—	—	Not released			
Virginia Tech	TDS	—	—	—	—	—	—	—	—	—	—	—	—	—				
Virginia Tech	CSN	—	—	RV	—	—	—	—	RV	—	—	—	—		Not released			
Wake Forest	USC	—	—	—	RV	—	—	—	—	23	15	16	15	20	Not released			
Wake Forest	TDS	—	—	—	16	21	18	13	13	9	7	9	10	17				
Wake Forest	CSN	—	—	—	RV	RV	RV	RV	—	RV	22	14	16		Not released			

== Postseason ==
=== ACC Tournament ===
Semifinals
1	SMU
13	Syracuse
11	NC State
7	North Carolina

Final

=== NCAA tournament ===
Seed	School	First round	2nd Round	3rd Round	Quarterfinals	Semifinals	Championship
	W–L (%):	0–0–0 (–)	0–0–0 (–)	0–0–0 (–)	0–0–0 (–)	0–0–0 (–)	0–0–0 (–) Total: 0–0–0 (–)

=== Awards ===
==== All-ACC awards and teams ====
2026 ACC Men's Soccer Individual Awards
Award	Recipient(s)
Coach of the Year	Kevin Hudson – SMU
Offensive Player of the Year	Joschi Schelb – North Carolina
Midfielder of the Year	Jaylinn Mitchell – SMU; Jack Pymm – Stanford
Defensive Player of the Year	Enzo Panozzo – SMU
Goalkeeper of the Year	Jonathan Evans – SMU
Freshman of the Year	Jack Ottley – Duke

2026 ACC Men's Soccer All-Conference Teams
First Team	Second Team	Third Team	All-Freshman Team
Ransford Gyan – Clemson; Jack Ottley – Duke; Joschi Schelb – North Carolina; Luca Nikolai – North Carolina; Aidan Payne – NC State; Jonathan Evans – SMU; Jaylinn Miychell – SMU; Ryan Clanton-Pimentel – SMU; Enzo Panozzo – SMU; Stephan Soghomonian – SMU; Jack Pymm – Stanford	Dylan Mafong – Boston College; Lukas Magnason – Clemson; Remi Okunlola – Clemson; Ethan Congleton – Duke; Giacomo Zizza – Louisville; Nico Loebus – North Carolina; Bertil Rygaard Hansen – North Carolina; Blake Kelly – Notre Dame; Noah Holmstrom – SMU; Marco Dos Santos – Virginia; Brendan Lambe – Virginia; Noe Uwimana – Virginia Tech	Andrej Borak – Boston College; D'Andre Pickett – California; Mason Jimenez – Clemson; Nick Lockermann – North Carolina; Ryan Zellefrow – North Carolina; Riley Moloney – NC State; Nolan Spicer – Notre Dame; Caden Grabfelder – Pittsburgh; Villads Landsperg – SMU; Alex Chow – Stanford; Tate Lorentz – Wake Forest	Lucca Guimaraes – California; Mateo Tsakiris – Clemson; Jack Ottley – Duke; Ethan Congleton – Duke; Cooper Olson – Louisville; Myles Carson – North Carolina; Michael Capretto – Notre Dame; Tristan Tropeano – Notre Dame; Mamadou Tall – Pittsburgh; Jayden Fitzgerald Boes – Stanford; Tim Fortier – Stanford

=== All-Americans ===
2026 United Soccer Coaches All-Americans
First Team	Second Team	Third Team

== MLS SuperDraft ==
=== Total picks by school ===
Team	Round 1	Round 2	Round 3	Total
Boston College				
California				
Clemson				
Duke				
Louisville				
NC State				
North Carolina				
Notre Dame				
Pittsburgh				
Stanford				
SMU				
Syracuse				
Virginia				
Virginia Tech				
Wake Forest				
Total				

=== List of selections ===
Round	Pick #	MLS team	Player	Position	College
