= 2026 Louisville Cardinals men's soccer team =

American college soccer season

2026 Louisville Cardinals men's soccer
- Conference: Atlantic Coast Conference
- U. Soc. Coaches poll: No. 8
- TopDrawerSoccer.com: No. 8
- Record: 12–3–3 (4–2–2 ACC)
- Head coach: John Michael Hayden (8th season)
- Assistant coaches: Stephen Lunney; Nick Blackwell; Thabane Sutu
- Home stadium: Dr. Mark & Cindy Lynn Stadium

2026 ACC men's soccer standings
| | Conf. | | | | | Overall |
| Team | W | | L | | T | W | | L | | T |
|---|---|---|---|---|---|---|---|---|---|---|
| No. 2 SMU † | 6 | – | 0 | – | 2 | 12 | – | 0 | – | 3 |
| No. 3 Clemson | 6 | – | 1 | – | 1 | 12 | – | 2 | – | 2 |
| No. 15 Wake Forest | 5 | – | 3 | – | 0 | 11 | – | 4 | – | 2 |
| No. 20 Pittsburgh | 4 | – | 2 | – | 2 | 9 | – | 4 | – | 3 |
| No. 8 Louisville | 4 | – | 2 | – | 2 | 12 | – | 2 | – | 3 |
| Virginia Tech | 4 | – | 2 | – | 2 | 8 | – | 5 | – | 3 |
| No. 17 North Carolina | 3 | – | 1 | – | 4 | 8 | – | 2 | – | 5 |
| Notre Dame | 4 | – | 4 | – | 0 | 7 | – | 5 | – | 3 |
| Virginia | 3 | – | 3 | – | 2 | 7 | – | 6 | – | 3 |
| California | 2 | – | 4 | – | 2 | 6 | – | 5 | – | 4 |
| NC State | 1 | – | 3 | – | 4 | 5 | – | 5 | – | 6 |
| Stanford | 1 | – | 4 | – | 3 | 8 | – | 4 | – | 3 |
| Syracuse | 1 | – | 5 | – | 2 | 7 | – | 7 | – | 2 |
| Boston College | 1 | – | 6 | – | 1 | 6 | – | 6 | – | 3 |
| Duke | 1 | – | 6 | – | 1 | 7 | – | 9 | – | 1 |
† – Conference champion ‡ – ACC tournament champion + – At-large invitation to the 2026 NCAA tournament; As of November 3, 2026; Rankings from United Soccer Coaches; Source:The ACC

The 2026 Louisville Cardinals men's soccer team represents the University of Louisville during the 2026 NCAA Division I men's soccer season. The Cardinals are led by head coach John Michael Hayden, in his eighth season, and play their home games at Dr. Mark & Cindy Lynn Stadium in Louisville, Kentucky. They compete in the Atlantic Coast Conference.

The Cardinals began the season unranked and went unbeaten through their first nine matches. They won their rivalry match at Kentucky 3–2 on a late goal from Giacomo Zizza, and drew 1–1 with fourteenth-ranked Indiana. Their first defeat came on September 25, 1–0 at twentieth-ranked Pittsburgh. Louisville won its next three matches, including a 1–0 win at 25th-ranked Syracuse, before losing 3–0 at fourth-ranked Clemson. In their next match, a 5–0 win over Spalding, the Cardinals outshot their opponent 43–0, the most shots they had taken in a match since 1992. They closed the regular season with a 2–1 win over Notre Dame on Senior Day and a 1–1 draw at top-ranked SMU, finishing 9–0–2 at home for the program's first unbeaten home regular season since 2010.

The Cardinals finished the regular season 12–2–3 and 4–2–2 in ACC play. As the fifth seed in the ACC Tournament, they hosted twelfth seed Stanford in the First Round, losing 2–1 on an 89th-minute Stanford goal. Louisville will await the NCAA Tournament selection show on November 16 for a possible at-large bid. Andrés Escudero Martín leads the team with seven goals, and Zizza leads with nine assists.

== Background ==
The Cardinals finished the 2025 season 5–7–5 and 1–5–2 in ACC play, a season that included a 1–0 home win over top-ranked Stanford. In the ACC Tournament, they lost 3–0 at third seed NC State in the First Round, and they did not receive a bid to the NCAA Tournament.

== Player movement ==
=== Players leaving ===
Departures
| Name | Number | Pos. | Height | Weight | Year | Hometown | Reason for Departure |
|---|---|---|---|---|---|---|---|
| Olayinka Ogunleye | 3 | DF | 6'4" | 190 | Sophomore | Bolingbrook, Illinois | — |
| Bilal Camara | 6 | MF | 5'7" | 155 | Junior | Paris, France | — |
| Chase Vazquez | 7 | FW | 5'10" | 170 | Redshirt Sophomore | Boca Raton, Florida | Transferred to Virginia Tech |
| TJ Kahoalii | 8 | MF | 5'10" | 155 | Sophomore | Whitman, Massachusetts | — |
| KG Sukati | 9 | FW | 6'3" | 196 | Senior | Johannesburg, South Africa | Graduated |
| Leon Kondic | 10 | MF | 6'4" | 163 | Sophomore | Jesenice, Slovenia | Transferred to James Madison |
| Michael Lee | 11 | FW | 5'10" | 153 | Sophomore | Toronto, Ontario | Transferred to Kentucky |
| Filip Fredhall | 12 | DF | 6'0" | 165 | Senior | Asker, Norway | Graduated |
| Matt Schenfeld | 14 | MF | 5'7" | 135 | Freshman | Louisville, Kentucky | — |
| Felix Masson | 16 | DF | 6'2" | 185 | Redshirt Freshman | Whitehorse, Yukon | — |
| Elijah Brijbasi | 17 | MF | 5'9" | 145 | Junior | Baltimore, Maryland | — |
| Dodge Brooks | 21 | MF | 6'0" | 165 | Freshman | Savannah, Georgia | Transferred to USC Upstate |
| Daniel Grider | 23 | MF | 5'11" | 160 | Freshman | Lexington, Kentucky | — |
| Alex Svetanoff | 29 | GK | 6'2" | 193 | Redshirt Junior | Crown Point, Indiana | Transferred to UAB |
| Andrew Seavers | 33 | GK | 6'3" | 185 | Freshman | Essex Junction, Vermont | — |

=== Players arriving ===
==== Incoming transfers ====
Incoming transfers
| Name | Number | Pos. | Height | Weight | Year | Hometown | Previous School |
|---|---|---|---|---|---|---|---|
| Mamadou Oumar Ndiaye | 6 | DF | 5'11" | 145 | Graduate Student | Dakar, Senegal | Fort Hays State |
| Braydon Sellers | 7 | MF | 5'11" | — | Junior | St. Louis, Missouri | Saint Louis |
| Andrés Escudero Martín | 9 | FW | 6'1" | — | Sophomore | San Sebastián de los Reyes, Spain | Evansville |
| Giacomo Zizza | 10 | MF | 5'11" | — | Junior | Denville, New Jersey | Lehigh |
| Håkon Edstrøm | 21 | MF | 6'2" | — | Junior | Bærum, Norway | Evansville |
| Eddie DeMarco | 29 | GK | 6'3" | 195 | Graduate Student | Monroe, New Jersey | Marshall / Delaware |

==== Recruiting class ====
| Name | Nat. | Hometown | Club / High school |
|---|---|---|---|
| Zolly Corrigan; MF | USA | El Cerrito, California | Berkeley High School |
| Maverick Deutsch; GK | USA | Los Angeles, California | Baker Web Academy |
| Ryan Hauser; MF | USA | Elk Grove Village, Illinois | Conant High School |
| Daniel Mandel; DF | NOR | Asker, Norway | Norges Toppidrettsgymnas |
| Brody Mayer; MF | USA | St. Louis, Missouri | — |
| Cooper Olson; FW | USA | Lake Zurich, Illinois | — |
| Jacopo Surricchio; MF | ITA | Chieti, Italy | Istituto Dante Alighieri Modena |
| Emil Thor; FW | DEN | Copenhagen, Denmark | VUC Lyngby |

== Squad ==
=== Roster ===
As of November 6, 2026

Note: Flags indicate national team as defined under FIFA eligibility rules; some limited exceptions apply. Players may hold more than one non-FIFA nationality.

| No. | Pos. | Nation | Player |
|---|---|---|---|
| 1 | GK | CAN | Nathaniel Abraham |
| 2 | DF | USA | Silas Damm |
| 4 | DF | CAN | Noah De Blasis |
| 5 | DF | USA | Jack Boring |
| 6 | DF | SEN | Mamadou Oumar Ndiaye |
| 7 | MF | USA | Braydon Sellers |
| 8 | MF | ITA | Jacopo Surricchio |
| 9 | FW | ESP | Andrés Escudero Martín |
| 10 | MF | USA | Giacomo Zizza |
| 11 | MF | USA | Brody Mayer |
| 12 | DF | NOR | Daniel Mandel |
| 13 | DF | USA | Ryan Quintos |
| 15 | DF | USA | Ephram Amones |
| 17 | FW | USA | Johnny Petruso |

| No. | Pos. | Nation | Player |
|---|---|---|---|
| 18 | FW | CAN | Quinton Wilson |
| 19 | DF | USA | Nicholas Parham |
| 20 | DF | USA | Ashton Flowers |
| 21 | MF | NOR | Håkon Edstrøm |
| 22 | MF | USA | Fernando Sanchez |
| 23 | FW | DEN | Emil Thor |
| 24 | MF | ENG | Jack Lewis |
| 25 | MF | USA | Zolly Corrigan |
| 27 | MF | USA | Ryan Hauser |
| 29 | GK | USA | Eddie DeMarco |
| 31 | GK | USA | Liam McClen |
| 33 | GK | USA | Maverick Deutsch |
| 35 | FW | USA | Cooper Olson |

=== Team management ===
| Position | Staff |
|---|---|
| Head coach | John Michael Hayden |
| Associate head coach | Stephen Lunney |
| Assistant coach | Nick Blackwell |
| Volunteer assistant coach | Thabane Sutu |
| Director of operations | James Kusak |
| Graduate manager | Donal Rahill |

== Schedule ==
| Date Time, TV | Rank^{#} | Opponent^{#} | Result | Record | Site (Attendance) City, State |
Regular season
| August 20*; 6:00 p.m. | | IU Indy | W 2–1 | 1–0–0 | Lynn Stadium (312); Louisville, KY |
| August 24*; 7:30 p.m. | | at Kentucky; Rivalry | W 3–2 | 2–0–0 | Bell Soccer Complex (2,407); Lexington, KY |
| August 27*; 6:00 p.m. | | Lipscomb | W 3–1 | 3–0–0 | Lynn Stadium (412); Louisville, KY |
| August 31*; 7:00 p.m., ACCN | | No. 14 Indiana | T 1–1 | 3–0–1 | Lynn Stadium (1,520); Louisville, KY |
| September 3*; 8:00 p.m. | No. 22 | Wright State | W 3–0 | 4–0–1 | Lynn Stadium (210); Louisville, KY |
| September 8*; 8:00 p.m. | No. 21 | at Evansville | W 1–0 | 5–0–1 | Arad McCutchan Stadium (627); Evansville, IN |
| September 13; 3:00 p.m. | No. 21 | California | W 3–2 | 6–0–1 (1–0–0) | Lynn Stadium (335); Louisville, KY |
| September 18; 6:00 p.m. | No. 15 | Boston College | T 3–3 | 6–0–2 (1–0–1) | Lynn Stadium (684); Louisville, KY |
| September 21*; 6:00 p.m. | No. 15 | Belmont | W 3–0 | 7–0–2 | Lynn Stadium (252); Louisville, KY |
| September 25; 7:00 p.m. | No. 16 | at No. 20 Pittsburgh | L 0–1 | 7–1–2 (1–1–1) | Ambrose Urbanic Field (753); Pittsburgh, PA |
| October 2; 6:00 p.m. | No. 17 | NC State | W 2–1 | 8–1–2 (2–1–1) | Lynn Stadium (465); Louisville, KY |
| October 6*; 6:00 p.m. | No. 11 | DePaul | W 4–1 | 9–1–2 | Lynn Stadium (284); Louisville, KY |
| October 10; 7:00 p.m. | No. 11 | at No. 25 Syracuse | W 1–0 | 10–1–2 (3–1–1) | SU Soccer Stadium (1,267); Syracuse, NY |
| October 16; 7:30 p.m., ACCN | No. 8 | at No. 4 Clemson | L 0–3 | 10–2–2 (3–2–1) | Riggs Field (5,135); Clemson, SC |
| October 21*; 6:00 p.m. | No. 10 | Spalding | W 5–0 | 11–2–2 | Lynn Stadium (538); Louisville, KY |
| October 25; 3:00 p.m. | No. 10 | Notre Dame | W 2–1 | 12–2–2 (4–2–1) | Lynn Stadium (813); Louisville, KY |
| October 30; 7:30 p.m., ACCN | No. 10 | at No. 1 SMU | T 1–1 | 12–2–3 (4–2–2) | Washburne Stadium (1,985); Dallas, TX |
ACC Tournament
| November 4*; 6:00 p.m., ACCNX | (5) No. 8 | (12) Stanford; First Round | L 1–2 | 12–3–3 | Lynn Stadium (854); Louisville, KY |
*Non-conference game. ^{#}Rankings from United Soccer Coaches. (#) Tournament seedings in parentheses. All times are in Eastern.

== Goals record ==
Through November 4, 2026.

| Rank | No. | Nat. | Po. | Name | Regular season | ACC Tournament | NCAA Tournament | Total |
|---|---|---|---|---|---|---|---|---|
| 1 | 9 | (Spain) | FW | Andrés Escudero Martín | 7 | 0 | 0 | 7 |
| 2 | 10 | (United States) | MF | Giacomo Zizza | 6 | 0 | 0 | 6 |
| 2 | 35 | (United States) | FW | Cooper Olson | 6 | 0 | 0 | 6 |
| 4 | 7 | (United States) | MF | Braydon Sellers | 5 | 0 | 0 | 5 |
| 5 | 8 | (Italy) | MF | Jacopo Surricchio | 3 | 0 | 0 | 3 |
| 5 | 23 | (Denmark) | FW | Emil Thor | 2 | 1 | 0 | 3 |
| 7 | 13 | (United States) | DF | Ryan Quintos | 2 | 0 | 0 | 2 |
| 8 | 4 | (Canada) | DF | Noah De Blasis | 1 | 0 | 0 | 1 |
| 8 | 11 | (United States) | MF | Brody Mayer | 1 | 0 | 0 | 1 |
| 8 | 17 | (United States) | FW | Johnny Petruso | 1 | 0 | 0 | 1 |
| 8 | 21 | (Norway) | MF | Håkon Edstrøm | 1 | 0 | 0 | 1 |
| 8 | 27 | (United States) | MF | Ryan Hauser | 1 | 0 | 0 | 1 |
| Own goals | | | | | 1 | 0 | 0 | 1 |
| Total | | | | | 37 | 1 | 0 | 38 |

== Disciplinary record ==
Through November 4, 2026. Does not include three cautions issued to the Louisville bench.

| Rank | No. | Nat. | Po. | Name | Regular Season | | | ACC Tournament | | | NCAA Tournament | | | Total | | |
| Rank | No. | Nat. | Po. | Name | Yellow card | (yellow card) (yellow-red card) | Red card | Yellow card | (yellow card) (yellow-red card) | Red card | Yellow card | (yellow card) (yellow-red card) | Red card | Yellow card | (yellow card) (yellow-red card) | Red card |
|---|---|---|---|---|---|---|---|---|---|---|---|---|---|---|---|---|
| 1 | 5 | (United States) | DF | Jack Boring | 3 | 0 | 0 | 1 | 0 | 0 | 0 | 0 | 0 | 4 | 0 | 0 |
| 2 | 4 | (Canada) | DF | Noah De Blasis | 2 | 0 | 1 | 0 | 0 | 0 | 0 | 0 | 0 | 2 | 0 | 1 |
| 3 | 35 | (United States) | FW | Cooper Olson | 3 | 0 | 0 | 0 | 0 | 0 | 0 | 0 | 0 | 3 | 0 | 0 |
| 4 | 13 | (United States) | DF | Ryan Quintos | 1 | 0 | 1 | 0 | 0 | 0 | 0 | 0 | 0 | 1 | 0 | 1 |
| 5 | 6 | (Senegal) | DF | Mamadou Oumar Ndiaye | 2 | 0 | 0 | 0 | 0 | 0 | 0 | 0 | 0 | 2 | 0 | 0 |
| 5 | 9 | (Spain) | FW | Andrés Escudero Martín | 2 | 0 | 0 | 0 | 0 | 0 | 0 | 0 | 0 | 2 | 0 | 0 |
| 5 | 20 | (United States) | DF | Ashton Flowers | 1 | 0 | 0 | 1 | 0 | 0 | 0 | 0 | 0 | 2 | 0 | 0 |
| 5 | 21 | (Norway) | MF | Håkon Edstrøm | 2 | 0 | 0 | 0 | 0 | 0 | 0 | 0 | 0 | 2 | 0 | 0 |
| 5 | 22 | (United States) | MF | Fernando Sanchez | 2 | 0 | 0 | 0 | 0 | 0 | 0 | 0 | 0 | 2 | 0 | 0 |
| 5 | 24 | (England) | MF | Jack Lewis | 2 | 0 | 0 | 0 | 0 | 0 | 0 | 0 | 0 | 2 | 0 | 0 |
| 11 | 2 | (United States) | DF | Silas Damm | 1 | 0 | 0 | 0 | 0 | 0 | 0 | 0 | 0 | 1 | 0 | 0 |
| 11 | 7 | (United States) | MF | Braydon Sellers | 1 | 0 | 0 | 0 | 0 | 0 | 0 | 0 | 0 | 1 | 0 | 0 |
| 11 | 8 | (Italy) | MF | Jacopo Surricchio | 1 | 0 | 0 | 0 | 0 | 0 | 0 | 0 | 0 | 1 | 0 | 0 |
| 11 | 10 | (United States) | MF | Giacomo Zizza | 1 | 0 | 0 | 0 | 0 | 0 | 0 | 0 | 0 | 1 | 0 | 0 |
| 11 | 15 | (United States) | DF | Ephram Amones | 1 | 0 | 0 | 0 | 0 | 0 | 0 | 0 | 0 | 1 | 0 | 0 |
| 11 | 17 | (United States) | FW | Johnny Petruso | 1 | 0 | 0 | 0 | 0 | 0 | 0 | 0 | 0 | 1 | 0 | 0 |
| 11 | 19 | (United States) | DF | Nicholas Parham | 1 | 0 | 0 | 0 | 0 | 0 | 0 | 0 | 0 | 1 | 0 | 0 |
| Total | | | | | 27 | 0 | 2 | 2 | 0 | 0 | 0 | 0 | 0 | 29 | 0 | 2 |

== Awards and honors ==
| Recipient | Award | Date | Ref. |
|---|---|---|---|
| Cooper Olson | ACC Offensive Player of the Week | — | |

== Rankings ==
Ranking movements Legend: ██ Increase in ranking ██ Decrease in ranking — = Not ranked RV = Received votes
| | Week | | | | | | | | | | | | | | | | |
| Poll | Pre | 1 | 2 | 3 | 4 | 5 | 6 | 7 | 8 | 9 | 10 | 11 | 12 | 13 | 14 | 15 | Final |
|---|---|---|---|---|---|---|---|---|---|---|---|---|---|---|---|---|---|
| United Soccer | — | — | 22 | 21 | 15 | 16 | 17 | 11 | 8 | 10 | 10 | 8 | | Not released | | | |
| TopDrawer Soccer | — | — | — | — | 14 | 10 | 15 | 17 | 17 | 13 | 13 | 8 | 8 | | | | |
| College Soccer News | — | RV | 23 | 23 | 14 | 14 | 18 | 14 | 12 | 12 | 10 | 10 | | | Not released | | |
