= 2026 SMU Mustangs men's soccer team =

American college soccer season

2026 SMU Mustangs men's soccer
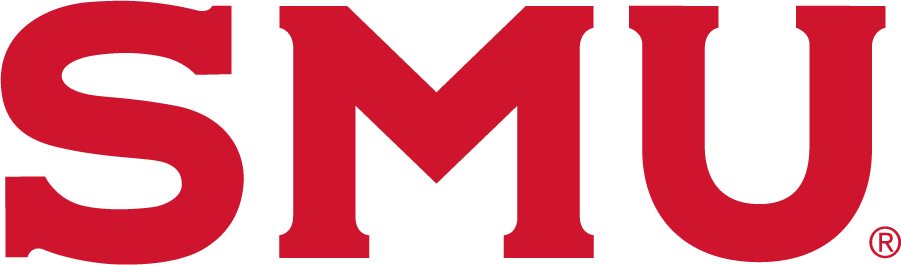

ACC regular season champions
- Conference: Atlantic Coast Conference
- U. Soc. Coaches poll: No. 2
- TopDrawerSoccer.com: No. 2
- Record: 12–0–3 (6–0–2 ACC)
- Head coach: Kevin Hudson (12th season)
- Assistant coaches: Michael King (6th season); Jaime Ibarra-Perez (3rd season); Ross Fitzpatrick (3rd season)
- Home stadium: Washburne Stadium

2026 ACC men's soccer standings
	Conf.					Overall
Team	W		L		T	W		L		T
No. 1 SMU †	6	–	0	–	2	13	–	0	–	3
No. 5 Clemson	6	–	1	–	1	13	–	3	–	2
No. 20 Wake Forest	5	–	3	–	0	11	–	5	–	3
No. 13 Louisville	4	–	2	–	2	12	–	3	–	3
No. 21 Pittsburgh	4	–	2	–	2	9	–	4	–	4
Virginia Tech	4	–	2	–	2	8	–	6	–	3
No. 12 North Carolina	3	–	1	–	4	9	–	2	–	6
Notre Dame	4	–	4	–	0	7	–	5	–	4
Virginia	3	–	3	–	2	7	–	7	–	4
California	2	–	4	–	2	6	–	5	–	5
NC State	1	–	3	–	4	7	–	5	–	6
Stanford	1	–	4	–	3	9	–	5	–	3
Syracuse	1	–	5	–	2	8	–	7	–	3
Boston College	1	–	6	–	1	6	–	6	–	4
Duke	1	–	6	–	1	7	–	10	–	1
† – Conference champion ‡ – ACC tournament champion + – At-large invitation to the 2026 NCAA tournament; As of November 8, 2026; Rankings from United Soccer Coaches; Source:The ACC

The 2026 SMU Mustangs men's soccer team represents Southern Methodist University during the 2026 NCAA Division I men's soccer season. It is the 52nd season of the university fielding a program, and their third season competing in the Atlantic Coast Conference. The Mustangs are led by twelfth year head coach Kevin Hudson and play their home games at Washburne Stadium in Dallas, Texas.

The Mustangs entered the season as the defending ACC tournament champions and were ranked fifteenth in the preseason United Soccer Coaches poll. They were picked to finish fourth in the ACC preseason coaches' poll. SMU opened the season with a 3–1 win over Stetson and then defeated fourth-ranked Saint Louis 4–0 on the road, which moved them up to fifth in the rankings. The Mustangs won five of their first six non-conference matches, with the only blemish a 1–1 draw against Kansas City. They opened ACC play with a 3–1 win at Pittsburgh, and followed it with conference wins over NC State, Virginia Tech, and Wake Forest. On September 29, the Mustangs were ranked first in the United Soccer Coaches poll for the first time since 2006. They remained first for five consecutive weeks, during which they defeated Duke 6–0 and drew twenty-fifth ranked Stanford 0–0. A 2–0 win at California on October 24 clinched at least a share of the ACC regular season title. In the regular season finale, a late goal from Landon Hickam earned a 1–1 draw against tenth-ranked Louisville despite SMU playing with ten men for the final thirty minutes.

The Mustangs finished the regular season 12–0–3 overall and 6–0–2 in ACC play to win the program's first ACC regular season championship outright. It was the program's first unbeaten regular season since 2001, and SMU was the only unbeaten team in the nation at the end of the regular season.

== Background ==
The Mustangs finished the 2025 season 11–5–4 overall and 3–2–3 in ACC play. As the seventh seed in the ACC Tournament, they defeated tenth seed Wake Forest 5–4 in the First Round, second seed Stanford 1–0 in the Quarterfinals, and sixth seed Syracuse 5–1 in the Semifinals. They defeated first seed Virginia 1–0 in the Final to win the program's first ACC tournament title, which was also SMU's first ACC team championship in any sport. They received the fifth overall seed in the NCAA Tournament and a bye into the Second Round, where they lost 1–0 to Washington to end their season.

== Player movement ==
=== Players leaving ===
Departures
Name	Number	Pos.	Height	Weight	Year	Hometown	Reason for Departure
Martin Dominguez	1	GK	5'11"	185	Senior	Dallas, Texas	Graduated
Slade Starnes	5	DF	6'3"	185	Senior	Dallas, Texas	Signed homegrown contract with FC Dallas
Charles-Emile Brunet	8	MF	5'8"	145	Sophomore	Montreal, Canada	Drafted 80th overall in the 2026 MLS SuperDraft; signed with Nashville SC
Daniel Escorcia	10	MF	5'6"	141	Senior	Bogotá, Colombia	Graduated
Fredrik Skilberg	11	FW	5'10"	159	Senior	Stockholm, Sweden	Transferred to Kentucky
Richard Garcia	13	MF	5'9"	165	Senior	Dallas, Texas	Graduated
Noah Ervin	17	MF	5'10"	160	Junior	Phoenix, Arizona	—
Soren Russell	18	GK	6'4"	180	Senior	Bellevue, Washington	Graduated
Brendan Baird	22	MF	6'2"	186	Senior	Albuquerque, New Mexico	Graduated
Matthias Dick	23	DF	5'10"	—	Senior	Tettnang, Germany	Graduated
Luis Flores	25	FW	5'10"	—	Graduate Student	Lufkin, Texas	Graduated
Anden Ellis	28	DF	5'9"	160	Freshman	St. Louis, Missouri	—
Chance Johnson	37	GK	6'4"	177	Senior	Mustang, Oklahoma	Graduated

=== Players arriving ===
==== Incoming transfers ====
Incoming transfers
Name	Number	Pos.	Height	Weight	Year	Hometown	Previous School
Jonathan Evans	1	GK	6'1"	—	Redshirt Sophomore	Collegeville, Pennsylvania	Penn State
Noah Holmstrøm	5	DF	6'2"	186	Junior	Aalborg, Denmark	Georgia Southern
Tweneboa Kodua	8	MF	5'9"	—	Junior	Accra, Ghana	Oral Roberts
Franco Ocaña	11	MF	5'7"	145	Sophomore	Las Varillas, Argentina	Gardner–Webb
TJ Dilley	12	DF	6'2"	180	Redshirt Sophomore	Dana Point, California	Saint Mary's
Nick Harshaw	15	MF	5'10"	145	Junior	Louisville, Kentucky	Bellarmine
Dunes Nielsen	17	MF	5'11"	—	Junior	Prosper, Texas	Utah Tech
Micah Ramirez	18	GK	6'0"	—	Graduate Student	Plano, Texas	Western Illinois
Andre Philibbosian	21	MF	6'0"	—	Redshirt Junior	San Diego, California	Seattle U
Daniel Wozniak	37	GK	6'5"	195	Sophomore	Lee's Summit, Missouri	Johnson County Community College

SMU's transfer class was ranked third in the nation by TopDrawerSoccer. In addition, Owen Zarnick returned for a final season through a medical hardship waiver, and Jaylinn Mitchell, who was selected 23rd overall by Minnesota United FC in the 2026 MLS SuperDraft, returned to SMU for his senior season.

==== Recruiting class ====
Name	Nat.	Hometown	Club	TDS Rating
Ryder Balch; DF	USA	Trophy Club, Texas	Solar Soccer Club	3/5 stars
Sam Cunniffe; DF	USA	Shrewsbury, Massachusetts	FC Greater Boston Bolts	3/5 stars
Sam Miller; DF	USA	Sherwood, Oregon	United PDX	3/5 stars
Max Sauceda; DF	USA	Austin, Texas	Capital City Soccer Club	3/5 stars
Joseluis Villagomez; DF	USA	El Paso, Texas	El Paso Locomotive	3/5 stars

== Squad ==
=== Roster ===
As of November 4, 2026

Note: Flags indicate national team as defined under FIFA eligibility rules; some limited exceptions apply. Players may hold more than one non-FIFA nationality.

No.	Pos.	Nation	Player
1	GK	USA	Jonathan Evans
2	DF	USA	Ryan Clanton-Pimentel
3	DF	DEN	Villads Landsperg
4	DF	USA	Mason Grimm
5	DF	DEN	Noah Holmstrøm
6	MF	ESP	Alex Salvo
7	MF	USA	Jaylinn Mitchell
8	MF	GHA	Tweneboa Kodua
10	FW	USA	Milton Lopez
11	MF	ARG	Franco Ocaña
12	DF	USA	TJ Dilley
14	DF	USA	Enzo Panozzo
15	MF	USA	Nick Harshaw
16	MF	USA	Landon Hickam
17	MF	USA	Dunes Nielsen
18	GK	USA	Micah Ramirez
19	DF	USA	Joseluis Villagomez

No.	Pos.	Nation	Player
20	FW	UGA	Mukisa Emmanuel
21	MF	USA	Andre Philibbosian
22	DF	USA	Max Sauceda
23	FW	USA	Oliver Knotek
24	FW	USA	Chris Deamon
25	DF	USA	Owen Zarnick
26	MF	USA	Caleb Bronold
27	DF	USA	Ryder Balch
28	DF	USA	Sam Cunniffe
29	GK	USA	Nathan Kinser
30	FW	USA	Stephan Soghomonian
32	DF	USA	Sam Miller
33	FW	USA	Spencer Zachgo
34	FW	USA	Trey Clements
37	GK	USA	Daniel Wozniak

=== Team management ===
Position	Staff
Head coach	Kevin Hudson
Associate Head Coach / Recruiting Coordinator	Michael King
Associate Head Coach / Goalkeeping	Jaime Ibarra-Perez
Assistant Coach	Ross Fitzpatrick

== Schedule ==
Date Time, TV	Rank^{#}	Opponent^{#}	Result	Record	Site (Attendance) City, State
Regular season
August 20*; 8:00 p.m., ACCNX	No. 15	Stetson	W 3–1	1–0–0	Washburne Stadium (786); Dallas, TX
August 24*; 7:00 p.m., ESPN+	No. 15	at No. 4 Saint Louis	W 4–0	2–0–0	Hermann Stadium (1,233); St. Louis, MO
August 28*; 7:00 p.m., ACCNX	No. 5	Loyola Marymount	W 2–0	3–0–0	Washburne Stadium (956); Dallas, TX
August 31*; 7:00 p.m., ACCNX	No. 5	Houston Christian	W 6–0	4–0–0	Washburne Stadium (687); Dallas, TX
September 4*; 7:00 p.m., ACCNX	No. 3	Kansas City	T 1–1	4–0–1	Washburne Stadium (1,087); Dallas, TX
September 7*; 7:00 p.m., ACCNX	No. 3	Incarnate Word	W 3–0	5–0–1	Washburne Stadium (627); Dallas, TX
September 11; 6:00 p.m., ACCNX	No. 7	at Pittsburgh	W 3–1	6–0–1 (1–0–0)	Ambrose Urbanic Field (681); Pittsburgh, PA
September 18; 8:00 p.m., ACCN	No. 5	NC State	W 1–0	7–0–1 (2–0–0)	Washburne Stadium (2,097); Dallas, TX
September 27; 3:00 p.m., ACCNX	No. 3	at Virginia Tech	W 3–0	8–0–1 (3–0–0)	Thompson Field (930); Blacksburg, VA
October 2; 6:00 p.m., ACCNX	No. 1	at Wake Forest	W 2–0	9–0–1 (4–0–0)	Spry Stadium (3,515); Winston-Salem, NC
October 10; 6:00 p.m., ACCNX	No. 1	Duke	W 6–0	10–0–1 (5–0–0)	Washburne Stadium (2,243); Dallas, TX
October 16; 5:00 p.m., ACCNX	No. 1	No. 25 Stanford	T 0–0	10–0–2 (5–0–1)	Washburne Stadium (2,056); Dallas, TX
October 20*; 6:00 p.m., ACCNX	No. 1	Central Arkansas	W 5–2	11–0–2	Washburne Stadium (723); Dallas, TX
October 24; 5:00 p.m., ACCNX	No. 1	at California	W 2–0	12–0–2 (6–0–1)	Edwards Stadium (514); Berkeley, CA
October 30; 6:30 p.m., ACCN	No. 1	No. 10 Louisville	T 1–1	12–0–3 (6–0–2)	Washburne Stadium (1,985); Dallas, TX
ACC Tournament
November 8 TBA, ACCN	(1) No. 2	TBD (No. 8 Notre Dame / No. 9 Virginia); Quarterfinals	W 6-0		Washburne Stadium; Dallas, TX
*Non-conference game. ^{#}Rankings from United Soccer Coaches. (#) Tournament seedings in parentheses. All times are in Central.

== Goals record ==
Through November 4, 2026.

Rank	No.	Nat.	Po.	Name	Regular season	ACC Tournament	NCAA Tournament	Total
1	30	(United States)	FW	Stephan Soghomonian	10	0	0	10
2	16	(United States)	MF	Landon Hickam	6	0	0	6
2	20	(Uganda)	FW	Mukisa Emmanuel	6	0	0	6
4	10	(United States)	FW	Milton Lopez	5	0	0	5
5	7	(United States)	MF	Jaylinn Mitchell	3	0	0	3
5	14	(United States)	DF	Enzo Panozzo	3	0	0	3
7	11	(Argentina)	MF	Franco Ocaña	2	0	0	2
7	21	(United States)	MF	Andre Philibbosian	2	0	0	2
9	3	(Denmark)	DF	Villads Landsperg	1	0	0	1
9	6	(Spain)	MF	Alex Salvo	1	0	0	1
9	8	(Ghana)	MF	Tweneboa Kodua	1	0	0	1
9	15	(United States)	MF	Nick Harshaw	1	0	0	1
9	19	(United States)	DF	Joseluis Villagomez	1	0	0	1
Total					42	0	0	42

== Awards and honors ==
Recipient	Award	Date	Ref.
Stephan Soghomonian	Preseason All-ACC Watchlist	August 12	
Noah Holmstrøm	Hermann Trophy Preseason Watchlist	August 19	
Noah Holmstrøm	Hermann Trophy Midseason Watchlist	October 5	
Jonathan Evans	Hermann Trophy Midseason Watchlist	October 5	
Jaylinn Mitchell	Hermann Trophy Midseason Watchlist	October 5	
Jaylinn Mitchell	ACC Defensive Player of the Week – Week 2	September 1	
Enzo Panozzo	ACC Co-Defensive Player of the Week – Week 5	September 22	
Enzo Panozzo	ACC Defensive Player of the Week – Week 6	September 29	
Ryan Clanton-Pimentel	ACC Defensive Player of the Week – Week 10	October 27	

== Rankings ==
Ranking movements Legend: ██ Increase in ranking ██ Decrease in ranking
	Week																
Poll	Pre	1	2	3	4	5	6	7	8	9	10	11	12	13	14	15	Final
United Soccer	15	5	3	7	5	3	1	1	1	1	1	2		Not released			
TopDrawer Soccer	14	15	3	8	4	3	1	1	1	1	1	2					
College Soccer News	14	9	4	4	2	3	1	1	1	1	2	2			Not released		
