= 2017 American Athletic Conference men's soccer tournament =

5th Edition of the American Athletic Conference Men's Soccer Tournament

- Tournament Logo
- Classification: Division I
- Teams: 4
- Matches: 3
- Site: Westcott Field; Dallas, Texas
- Champions: SMU (1st title)
- Winning coach: Kevin Hudson (1st title)
- MVP: Emil Cuello (Offensive) (SMU); Jordan Cano (Defensive) (SMU)
- Broadcast: American Digital Network, ESPNU

2017 American Athletic Conference men's soccer standings
	Conf.					Overall
Team	W		L		T	W		L		T
No. 8 SMU ‡	5	–	1	–	1	17	–	3	–	1
UCF	4	–	2	–	1	8	–	6	–	2
Connecticut	4	–	3	–	0	8	–	8	–	2
Temple	4	–	3	–	0	9	–	8	–	1
South Florida	3	–	2	–	2	6	–	6	–	4
Tulsa	3	–	4	–	0	6	–	8	–	1
Memphis	2	–	3	–	2	4	–	8	–	4
Cincinnati	0	–	7	–	0	7	–	9	–	1
‡ – 2017 American Tournament champion + – Invited to the 2017 NCAA Division I Men's Soccer Championship; As of December 13, 2017; Rankings from United Soccer Coaches

The 2017 American Athletic Conference men's soccer tournament was the 5th edition of the American Athletic Conference Men's Soccer Tournament. The tournament decides the American Athletic Conference champion and guaranteed representative into the 2017 NCAA Division I Men's Soccer Championship. The tournament was played at Westcott Field on the campus of SMU in Dallas on November 10 and 12.

== Seeding and format ==
The teams are seeded based on their performance in the conference's round-robin regular season. The top four teams qualify for the event.

Seed	Team	W	L	T	Pct	Pts
1	SMU	5	1	1	.786	16
2	UCF	4	2	1	.643	13
3	Connecticut	4	3	0	.571	12
4	Temple	4	3	0	.571	12

== Bracket ==
Semifinals
1	SMU	4
4	Temple	0
2	UCF	1
3	Connecticut	0

Finals
1	SMU	2
2	UCF	1

== Results ==
=== Semifinals ===
November 10
5:30 PM EST

^{No. 2} UCF Knights	1–0	^{No. 3} Connecticut Huskies
Pyysalo (yellow card) 42'; Sorokin 73'; Stiegwardt (yellow card) 80'	Report	Burnett (yellow card) 42'

Westcott Field, Dallas, Texas
Attendance: 264
Referee: Jorge Luna Hernandez

November 10
8:00 PM EST

^{No. 1} SMU Mustangs	4–0	^{No. 4} Temple Owls
Cuello 3'; Cano 5'; Ponder (yellow card) 53'; Hernandez 59'; Williams, Jr. 85'		Sigthórsson (yellow card) 5' (yellow-red card) 35'; Grasella (yellow card) 53'

Westcott Field, Dallas, Texas
Attendance: 512
Referee: Mark Allatin

=== Championship ===
November 12
2:00 PM EST

^{No. 1} SMU Mustangs	2–1 (a.e.t.)	^{No. 2} UCF Knights
Cano 77'; Cuello (yellow card) 80' 96'	Report	Steineger (yellow card) 66'; Jennings (red card) 86'; Ponder 87' (o.g.)

Westcott Field, Dallas, Texas
Attendance: 647
Referee: Khalaf Al-Latayfeh

== Broadcasting ==
The semifinals were streamed live on the American Digital Network. The final was carried live on ESPNU.

== Statistics ==
=== Goals ===
Rank	Player	College	Goals
1	(United States) Emil Cuello	SMU	2
2	(United States) Jordan Cano	SMU	1
2	(United States) Nicky Hernandez	SMU	1
2	(Israel) Yoni Sorokin	UCF	1
2	(United States) D. J. Williams, Jr.	SMU	1

=== Assists ===
Rank	Player	College	Assists
1	(United States) Gorka Aperribay	UCF	1
1	(United States) Christian Boorom	SMU	1
1	(United States) Bryce Clark	SMU	1
1	(United States) Garrett McLaughlin	SMU	1

=== Shutouts ===
Rank	Player	College	Shutouts
1	(United States) Michael Nelson	SMU	1
1	(United States) Matt Rosenberg	UCF	1

== Awards ==
=== Most valuable players ===
- Emil Cuello (Offensive) (SMU)
- Jordan Cano (Defensive) (SMU)

=== All-Tournament team ===
The following 11 players were named to the American Athletic Conference's All-Tournament team. A record six players from SMU were selected for the team.

Player	Nat.	School	Position	Class	Hometown (High school/Previous college/Previous club)
Louis Perez	FRA	UCF	MF	Fr.	Villennes-sur-Seine, France (Lycee Jeanne d'Albert)
Matias Pyysalo	FIN	UCF	MF	Jr.	Helsinki, Finland (HJK Helsinki)
Andreas Steineger	NOR	UCF	DF	Fr.	Oslo, Norway (The Norwegian High School for Elite Sports)
Yoni Sorokin	ISR	UCF	MF	Fr.	Jerusalem, Israel (Denmark High School)
Abdou Mbacke Thiam	SEN	Connecticut	FW	Jr.	Dakar, Senegal
Jordan Cano	USA	SMU	DF	So.	Frisco, Texas (Lone Star High School)
Bryce Clark	USA	SMU	MF	So.	Los Gatos, California (Los Gatos High School)
Emil Cuello	USA	SMU	MF	So.	Orem, Utah (Orem High School)
Nicky Hernandez	USA	SMU	FW	Fr.	Dallas, Texas (Dallas Texans)
Michael Nelson	USA	SMU	GK	RS So.	Katy, Texas (Seven Lakes)
Jared Rice	USA	SMU	DF	Sr.	Plano, Texas (Plano East Senior High School)

== See also ==
- 2017 American Athletic Conference Women's Soccer Tournament
