= 2026 Clemson Tigers men's soccer team =

American college soccer season

2026 Clemson Tigers men's soccer
- Conference: Atlantic Coast Conference
- U. Soc. Coaches poll: No. 3
- TopDrawerSoccer.com: No. 3
- Record: 13–2–2 (6–1–1 ACC)
- Head coach: Mike Noonan (17th season)
- Assistant coaches: Philip Jones (14th season); Gaye Diadie (2nd season); Michal Gorszczaryk (1st season)
- Home stadium: Riggs Field

2026 ACC men's soccer standings
	Conf.					Overall
Team	W		L		T	W		L		T
No. 2 SMU †	6	–	0	–	2	12	–	0	–	3
No. 3 Clemson	6	–	1	–	1	12	–	2	–	2
No. 15 Wake Forest	5	–	3	–	0	11	–	4	–	2
No. 20 Pittsburgh	4	–	2	–	2	9	–	4	–	3
No. 8 Louisville	4	–	2	–	2	12	–	2	–	3
Virginia Tech	4	–	2	–	2	8	–	5	–	3
No. 17 North Carolina	3	–	1	–	4	8	–	2	–	5
Notre Dame	4	–	4	–	0	7	–	5	–	3
Virginia	3	–	3	–	2	7	–	6	–	3
California	2	–	4	–	2	6	–	5	–	4
NC State	1	–	3	–	4	5	–	5	–	6
Stanford	1	–	4	–	3	8	–	4	–	3
Syracuse	1	–	5	–	2	7	–	7	–	2
Boston College	1	–	6	–	1	6	–	6	–	3
Duke	1	–	6	–	1	7	–	9	–	1
† – Conference champion ‡ – ACC tournament champion + – At-large invitation to the 2026 NCAA tournament; As of November 3, 2026; Rankings from United Soccer Coaches; Source:The ACC

The 2026 Clemson Tigers men's soccer team represents Clemson University during the 2026 NCAA Division I men's soccer season. The Tigers are led by head coach Mike Noonan, in his seventeenth season. They play their home games at Riggs Field in Clemson, South Carolina. This is the team's 66th season playing organized men's college soccer and their 39th playing in the Atlantic Coast Conference.

The Tigers began the season unranked and opened with a 5–1 win over third-ranked Furman, which moved them into the rankings at sixteenth. After a win over East Tennessee State, they lost their rivalry match at South Carolina 3–2. Clemson won at UCF, behind a hat-trick from Ransford Gyan, and opened ACC play with a 1–0 win at Syracuse. A 1–0 loss to Notre Dame in their ACC home opener was the Tigers' last defeat of the regular season. They went 9–0–2 over their final eleven regular season matches, including a 2–1 win at North Carolina in which they finished with nine men. On October 2, a 4–1 win over twentieth-ranked UNC Wilmington gave Noonan his 200th win at Clemson. The Tigers then defeated thirteenth-ranked Stanford and eighth-ranked Louisville to climb to third in the rankings, and closed the regular season with a 2–1 win over sixteenth-ranked Wake Forest on Senior Night.

The Tigers finished the regular season 12–2–2 and 6–1–1 in ACC play to finish in second place, one point behind SMU. As the second seed in the ACC Tournament, they defeated fifteenth seed Duke 2–1 in the First Round and will host seventh seed North Carolina in the Quarterfinals. Ransford Gyan's thirteen regular season goals ranked fourth in the nation.

== Previous season ==
The Tigers finished the 2025 regular season 8–4–3 and 4–2–2 in ACC play. As the fourth seed in the ACC Tournament, they lost 1–0 to thirteenth seed Pittsburgh in the First Round. The Tigers received an at-large bid to the NCAA Tournament, where they lost 1–0 to Western Michigan in the First Round to finish the season 8–6–3. Following the season, four Tigers were selected in the first round of the 2026 MLS SuperDraft, the most of any school.

== Player movement ==
=== Players leaving ===
Players Leaving
Name	Number	Pos.	Height	Weight	Year	Hometown	Reason for departure
Aiden Hampton	0	GK	6'3"	181	Senior	Southbury, Connecticut	Graduated
Joseph Andema	1	GK	6'0"	167	Senior	Accra-Kasoa, Ghana	Graduated
Daniel Bunk	6	MF	5'8"	167	Freshman	Wuppertal, Germany	Transferred to James Madison
Wahabu Musah	7	FW	6'0"	133	Sophomore	Accra, Ghana	Selected 26th overall in the 2026 MLS SuperDraft
Kwaku Agyabeng	8	MF	5'8"	152	Freshman	Kumasi, Ghana	Selected 4th overall in the 2026 MLS SuperDraft
Misei Yoshizawa	11	MF	5'8"	150	Senior	Tokyo, Japan	Graduated
Justin Ross	12	GK	6'0"	175	Freshman	West Chester, Pennsylvania	Transferred to Penn State
James Kelly	19	FW	6'2"	182	Senior	Gastonia, North Carolina	Graduated
Andres Beirute	20	FW	5'9"	173	Freshman	San José, Costa Rica	—
Gabriel Santuari	21	MF	5'11"	154	Graduate Student	Trento, Italy	Transferred to Kansas City
Vitor Geromel	24	FW	6'2"	181	Sophomore	Wichita, Kansas	Transferred to Western Michigan
Nathan Richmond	25	MF	5'6"	147	Senior	Atlanta, Georgia	Graduated
Marco Garcia	26	FW	5'9"	157	Senior	Liguria, Italy	Graduated

Lukas Magnason and Ransford Gyan were selected 13th and 27th overall in the 2026 MLS SuperDraft, by Real Salt Lake and New York City FC respectively, but returned to Clemson for the 2026 season.

=== Players arriving ===
==== Incoming transfers ====
Incoming transfers
Name	Number	Pos.	Height	Weight	Year	Hometown	Previous school
Aleksa Janjic	1	GK	6'1"	188	Graduate Student	Belgrade, Serbia	Marshall
Malick Daouda	6	MF	6'3"	176	Junior	Montreal, Canada	Penn State
Martin Bakken	7	FW	6'1"	160	Senior	Bærum, Norway	Dayton
Alessio Andreottola	11	FW	5'7"	179	Sophomore	Colmar, France	Fort Lewis
Breno Correia	19	DF	5'9"	152	Senior	Santo André, Brazil	Gardner–Webb

==== Recruiting class ====
Name	Nat.	Hometown	Club	TDS Rating
Jake Basinet; FW	USA	Escondido, California	Orlando City	4/5 stars
Johannes Kack; FW	SWE	Malmö, Sweden	—	N/A
Mateja Markovic; MF	SRB	Valjevo, Serbia	—	N/A
Philip Rolke; DF	SWE	Lidingö, Sweden	—	N/A
Christian Scott; MF	ENG	London, England	Aspire International School	N/A
Hayden Stamps; MF	USA	Prospect, Kentucky	Louisville City Academy	3/5 stars
Mateo Tsakiris; MF	USA	Corona del Mar, California	San Diego FC	4/5 stars

== Squad ==
=== Roster ===
As of November 4, 2026

Note: Flags indicate national team as defined under FIFA eligibility rules; some limited exceptions apply. Players may hold more than one non-FIFA nationality.

No.	Pos.	Nation	Player
0	GK	ESP	Gaizka Garcia
1	GK	SRB	Aleksa Janjic
2	DF	ISL	Lukas Magnason
3	DF	FRA	Arthur Duquenne
4	DF	ISL	Olafur Floki Stephensen
5	DF	GHA	Augustine Asante
6	MF	CAN	Malick Daouda
7	FW	NOR	Martin Bakken
8	MF	ENG	Christian Scott
9	FW	SWE	Johannes Kack
10	MF	GHA	Ransford Gyan
11	FW	FRA	Alessio Andreottola
13	MF	USA	Hayden Stamps
14	MF	USA	Cooper Hineline
15	MF	SEN	Abdou Mane
16	MF	USA	Mason Jimenez

No.	Pos.	Nation	Player
17	MF	RSA	Caleb George
18	DF	USA	Matthias Leib
19	DF	BRA	Breno Correia
20	MF	SRB	Mateja Markovic
22	DF	CRC	Kyle Mattis
23	FW	USA	Duncan Wilson
24	MF	USA	Mateo Tsakiris
25	FW	USA	Jake Basinet
26	DF	SWE	Philip Rolke
27	DF	USA	Seamus Streelman
28	FW	USA	Xander Sevian
30	DF	USA	Remi Okunlola
31	GK	USA	Ivan Schmid

=== Team management ===
Position	Staff
Athletic Director	(United States) Graham Neff
Head coach	(United States) Mike Noonan
Associate head coach	(England) Philip Jones
Assistant Coach	(France) Gaye Diadie
Assistant Coach	Michal Gorszczaryk
Director of Strategic Analytics and Operations	(United States) Rob Thompson

== Schedule ==
Date Time, TV	Rank^{#}	Opponent^{#}	Result	Record	Site (Attendance) City, State
Regular season
August 20*; 8:00 p.m.		No. 3 Furman	W 5–1	1–0–0	Riggs Field (4,323); Clemson, SC
August 23*; 7:00 p.m.		East Tennessee State	W 2–0	2–0–0	Riggs Field (4,110); Clemson, SC
August 28*; 7:00 p.m.	No. 16	at South Carolina; Rivalry	L 2–3	2–1–0	Stone Stadium (7,671); Columbia, SC
September 1*; 7:00 p.m.	No. 18	at UCF	W 4–1	3–1–0	UCF Soccer and Track Stadium (967); Orlando, FL
September 4; 7:00 p.m.	No. 18	at Syracuse	W 1–0	4–1–0 (1–0–0)	SU Soccer Stadium (2,531); Syracuse, NY
September 11; 7:00 p.m.	No. 17	Notre Dame	L 0–1	4–2–0 (1–1–0)	Riggs Field (6,143); Clemson, SC
September 15*; 7:00 p.m.	No. 21	North Florida	W 5–1	5–2–0	Riggs Field (2,059); Clemson, SC
September 19; 7:00 p.m.	No. 21	at North Carolina	W 2–1	6–2–0 (2–1–0)	Dorrance Field (1,693); Chapel Hill, NC
September 25; 7:00 p.m.	No. 14	Boston College	W 4–0	7–2–0 (3–1–0)	Riggs Field (1,848); Clemson, SC
September 29*; 7:00 p.m.	No. 9	Wofford	W 4–1	8–2–0	Riggs Field (1,918); Clemson, SC
October 2*; 7:00 p.m.	No. 9	No. 20 UNC Wilmington	W 4–1	9–2–0	Riggs Field (2,031); Clemson, SC
October 6*; 7:00 p.m.	No. 5	Georgia Southern	T 2–2	9–2–1	Riggs Field (1,462); Clemson, SC
October 11; 9:00 p.m.	No. 5	at No. 13 Stanford	W 3–2	10–2–1 (4–1–0)	Cagan Stadium (1,989); Stanford, CA
October 16; 7:30 p.m.	No. 4	No. 8 Louisville	W 3–0	11–2–1 (5–1–0)	Riggs Field (5,135); Clemson, SC
October 25; 2:00 p.m.	No. 3	at Virginia Tech	T 2–2	11–2–2 (5–1–1)	Thompson Field (831); Blacksburg, VA
October 30; 7:00 p.m.	No. 3	No. 16 Wake Forest	W 2–1	12–2–2 (6–1–1)	Riggs Field (4,389); Clemson, SC
ACC Tournament
November 4*; 7:00 p.m., ACCNX	(2) No. 3	(15) Duke; First Round	W 2–1	13–2–2	Riggs Field (892); Clemson, SC
November 8*; 12:00 p.m., ACCN	(2) No. 3	(7) No. 17 North Carolina; Quarterfinals			Riggs Field; Clemson, SC
*Non-conference game. ^{#}Rankings from United Soccer Coaches. (#) Tournament seedings in parentheses. All times are in Eastern.

== Goals record ==
Through November 4, 2026.

Rank	No.	Nat.	Po.	Name	Regular season	ACC Tournament	NCAA Tournament	Total
1	10	(Ghana)	MF	Ransford Gyan	13	0	0	13
2	23	(United States)	FW	Duncan Wilson	6	1	0	7
3	28	(United States)	FW	Xander Sevian	5	0	0	5
4	14	(United States)	MF	Cooper Hineline	4	0	0	4
5	16	(United States)	MF	Mason Jimenez	3	0	0	3
6	26	(Sweden)	DF	Philip Rolke	1	1	0	2
6	4	(Iceland)	DF	Olafur Floki Stephensen	2	0	0	2
6	6	(Canada)	MF	Malick Daouda	2	0	0	2
6	7	(Norway)	FW	Martin Bakken	2	0	0	2
6	11	(France)	FW	Alessio Andreottola	2	0	0	2
11	2	(Iceland)	DF	Lukas Magnason	1	0	0	1
11	9	(Sweden)	FW	Johannes Kack	1	0	0	1
11	25	(United States)	FW	Jake Basinet	1	0	0	1
11	30	(United States)	DF	Remi Okunlola	1	0	0	1
Own goals					1	0	0	1
Total					45	2	0	47

== Disciplinary record ==
Through November 4, 2026. Does not include one caution issued to the Clemson bench.

Rank	No.	Nat.	Po.	Name	Regular Season			ACC Tournament			NCAA Tournament			Total		
Rank	No.	Nat.	Po.	Name	Yellow card	(yellow card) (yellow-red card)	Red card	Yellow card	(yellow card) (yellow-red card)	Red card	Yellow card	(yellow card) (yellow-red card)	Red card	Yellow card	(yellow card) (yellow-red card)	Red card
1	2	(Iceland)	DF	Lukas Magnason	8	0	0	0	0	0	0	0	0	8	0	0
2	28	(United States)	FW	Xander Sevian	4	1	0	1	0	0	0	0	0	5	1	0
3	4	(Iceland)	DF	Olafur Floki Stephensen	3	0	0	0	0	0	0	0	0	3	0	0
3	16	(United States)	MF	Mason Jimenez	3	0	0	0	0	0	0	0	0	3	0	0
3	19	(Brazil)	DF	Breno Correia	2	0	0	1	0	0	0	0	0	3	0	0
3	24	(United States)	MF	Mateo Tsakiris	3	0	0	0	0	0	0	0	0	3	0	0
7	8	(England)	MF	Christian Scott	1	0	1	0	0	0	0	0	0	1	0	1
8	6	(Canada)	MF	Malick Daouda	2	0	0	0	0	0	0	0	0	2	0	0
8	10	(Ghana)	MF	Ransford Gyan	2	0	0	0	0	0	0	0	0	2	0	0
10	1	(Serbia)	GK	Aleksa Janjic	1	0	0	0	0	0	0	0	0	1	0	0
10	3	(France)	DF	Arthur Duquenne	1	0	0	0	0	0	0	0	0	1	0	0
10	5	(Ghana)	DF	Augustine Asante	1	0	0	0	0	0	0	0	0	1	0	0
10	11	(France)	FW	Alessio Andreottola	1	0	0	0	0	0	0	0	0	1	0	0
10	23	(United States)	FW	Duncan Wilson	1	0	0	0	0	0	0	0	0	1	0	0
10	26	(Sweden)	DF	Philip Rolke	1	0	0	0	0	0	0	0	0	1	0	0
Total					34	1	1	2	0	0	0	0	0	36	1	1

== Awards and honors ==
Recipient	Award	Date	Ref.
Ransford Gyan	Preseason All-ACC Watchlist	August 12	
Ransford Gyan	Hermann Trophy Preseason Watchlist	August 19	
Ransford Gyan	ACC Offensive Player of the Week – Week 3	September 8	
Ransford Gyan	ACC Offensive Player of the Week – Week 6	September 29	
Xander Sevian	ACC Offensive Player of the Week – Week 1	August 25	

== Rankings ==
Ranking movements Legend: ██ Increase in ranking ██ Decrease in ranking — = Not ranked RV = Received votes
	Week																
Poll	Pre	1	2	3	4	5	6	7	8	9	10	11	12	13	14	15	Final
United Soccer	—	16	18	17	21	14	9	5	4	3	3	3		Not released			
TopDrawer Soccer	—	3	9	6	19	8	4	4	4	3	5	3					
College Soccer News	RV	13	15	13	19	17	9	7	4	3	3	3			Not released		
