= Matias Pyysalo =

Finnish footballer (born 1995)

Personal information
- Date of birth: 5 May 1995 (age 31)
- Place of birth: Finland
- Position: Midfielder

Team information
- Current team: Toukolan Teräs

College career
Years	Team	Apps	(Gls)
2014–2017	UCF Knights	67	(30)

Senior career*
Years	Team	Apps	(Gls)
2011–2014	Klubi-04	57	(10)
2014	HJK	3	(0)
2019–2020	Kickers Offenbach	18	(2)
2021–2022	GrlFK	22	(4)
2023–	Toukolan Teräs		
- * Club domestic league appearances and goals

Matias Pyysalo (born 5 May 1995) is a Finnish former footballer who played as a midfielder for Toukolan Teräs.

== Early life ==
Pyysalo was born in 1995 in Finland. He grew up in Martinlaakso, Finland.

== Education ==
Pyysalo attended the University of Central Florida in the United States. He studied sports management.

== Career ==
Pyysalo started his career with Finnish side HJK. In 2019, he signed for German side Kickers Offenbach. In 2021, he signed for Finnish side GrlFK. In 2023, he signed for Finnish side Toukolan Teräs.

== Style of play ==
Pyysalo mainly operates as a midfielder. He also operated as a winger while playing for German side Kickers Offenbach.

== Personal life ==
Pyysalo has regarded Brazil internationals Philippe Coutinho and Kaká as his football idols.
