= Kevin Hudson (soccer) =

American soccer coach and former player

Personal information
- Date of birth: October 22, 1981 (age 45)
- Place of birth: St. Louis, Missouri, U.S.
- Position: Midfielder

College career
Years	Team	Apps	(Gls)
2000–2003	SMU		

Managerial career
- 2007–2014: SMU (assistant)
- 2015–: SMU

Kevin Hudson (born October 22, 1981) is an American retired soccer player who played collegiately at SMU and is currently the head coach of the SMU men's soccer team. He led SMU to its first Atlantic Coast Conference tournament title in 2025 and its first ACC regular season title in 2026.

== Playing career ==
Hudson played for SMU from 2000 to 2003 as a midfielder. During his freshman season SMU reached the Final Four of the NCAA tournament, where they lost to eventual champions Connecticut. In his sophomore season, the team achieved a 19–0–0 record, and was the number one seed in the 2001 NCAA tournament. They would lose in the Quarterfinals to St. John's. During the 2002 campaign, in his Junior season, the team again qualified for the 2002 NCAA tournament, but was eliminated in the Regional Semifinals. Hudson was named All-Missouri Valley Conference Second Team. In his Senior season, Hudson was named to the NSCAA/United Soccer Coaches All-Midwest Region team, Missouri Valley Conference Tournament MVP, and All-Missouri Valley First Team. However, the team did not reach the same highs in the 2003 NCAA tournament, as they were eliminated in the First Round.

Hudson was drafted 44th overall in the fifth round of the 2004 MLS SuperDraft by D.C. United. He would not make an appearance for the team.

== Coaching career ==
Hudson was hired as an assistant coach in 2007 by then head coach Schellas Hyndman. During his career as assistant coach, the Mustangs won three regular season conference championships, one conference tournament championship, and made five NCAA tournament appearances. He was promoted to associate head coach in 2014. During his season, the team finished with a 10–6–2 record. During the offseason, he was hired by North Carolina as an assistant coach, but reversed the decision when SMU offered him the head coaching job.

In his first full season as coach, the team claimed the American Athletic Conference regular season title, and advanced to the Round of 16 in the 2015 NCAA tournament. In 2017, the team would win the AAC regular season title and AAC tournament title. They again made the Round of 16 in the 2017 NCAA tournament. SMU would go on to win the next two AAC tournament titles. They would achieve their best NCAA tournament finish in nine years in the 2019 NCAA tournament, where they reached the Quarterfinals. The Mustangs would not qualify for the NCAA tournament again until 2022, where they were the eleventh overall seed, but lost in the Second Round. 2023 saw Hudson oversee a 14–2–2 regular season record, and the team's first AAC regular season title since 2018. The team earned the sixth seed in the 2023 NCAA tournament and reached the Round of 16. In 2023, four of Hudson's players were selected as All-Americans, the most of any team in the country that year.

The team transitioned into the Atlantic Coast Conference in 2024. They finished 12–3–6 and qualified for the 2024 NCAA tournament as the twelfth overall seed. They made the quarterfinals for the first time since 2019 but could not advance to the College Cup.

In 2025, Hudson led SMU to its first ACC tournament title as the seventh seed, defeating first seed Virginia 1–0 in the final. It was SMU's first ACC team championship in any sport. The Mustangs earned the fifth overall seed in the 2025 NCAA tournament, but lost 1–0 to Washington in the Second Round to finish 11–5–4.

In 2026, SMU was ranked first in the United Soccer Coaches poll for the first time since 2006. The Mustangs finished the regular season unbeaten at 12–0–3 and won the program's first ACC regular season title outright with a 6–0–2 conference record, earning the first seed in the 2026 ACC men's soccer tournament.

As of the 2024 season, Hudson had coached seven All-American selections, five conference players of the year, and thirty-nine all-conference selections. Through the 2026 regular season, he has won five conference regular season championships, four conference tournament titles, and made eight NCAA tournament appearances.

== Head coaching record ==
Record table
Season	Team	Overall	Conference	Standing	Postseason
SMU (American Athletic Conference) (2015–2023)
2015	SMU	15–3–4	7–0–1	1st	Round of 16
2016	SMU	6–9–1	2–4–1	T-7th	
2017	SMU	17–3–1	5–1–1	1st	Round of 16
2018	SMU	10–5–3	5–1–1	T-1st	First Round
2019	SMU	18–2–1	5–1–1	2nd	Quarterfinals
2020	SMU	5–5–1	5–5–0	4th	
2021	SMU	8–5–3	5–4–1	T-3rd	
2022	SMU	10–6–1	6–3–0	2nd	Second Round
2023	SMU	14–3–2	7–0–1	1st	Round of 16
SMU (Atlantic Coast Conference) (2024–present)
2024	SMU	12–3–6	4–2–2	T-4th	Quarterfinals
2025	SMU	11–5–4	3–2–3	7th	Second Round
2026	SMU	12–0–3	6–0–2	1st	
SMU:		138–49–30	60–23–14		
Total:		138–49–30			
National champion Postseason invitational champion Conference regular season champion Conference regular season and conference tournament champion Division regular season champion Division regular season and conference tournament champion Conference tournament champion

Source: Records through games of November 4, 2026.

== Personal life ==
Hudson obtained a Master's in the science of accountancy from the University of Notre Dame in 2005 and worked in finance prior to coaching.
