= SMU Mustangs men's soccer =

American college soccer team

- 2026 SMU Mustangs men's soccer team
- Founded: 1975; 51 years ago
- University: Southern Methodist University
- Head coach: Kevin Hudson (12th season)
- Conference: ACC
- Location: Dallas, Texas, US
- Stadium: Washburne Stadium (capacity: 2,577)
- Nickname: Mustangs
- Colors: Red and blue
Home

NCAA tournament College Cup
- 2000, 2005

NCAA tournament Quarterfinals
- 1985, 1986, 1988, 1990, 1991, 1992, 1995, 1997, 2000, 2001, 2005, 2010, 2019, 2024

NCAA tournament Round of 16
- 1979, 1980, 1984, 1985, 1986, 1987, 1988, 1989, 1990, 1991, 1992, 1994, 1995, 1997, 1999, 2000, 2001, 2002, 2004, 2005, 2010, 2015, 2017, 2019, 2023, 2024

NCAA tournament appearances
- 1979, 1980, 1983, 1984, 1985, 1986, 1987, 1988, 1989, 1990, 1991, 1992, 1994, 1995, 1996, 1997, 1998, 1999, 2000, 2001, 2002, 2003, 2004, 2005, 2006, 2007, 2010, 2011, 2012, 2015, 2017, 2018, 2019, 2022, 2023, 2024, 2025

Conference tournament championships
- 1997, 1999, 2001, 2003, 2004, 2006, 2011, 2017, 2018, 2019, 2025

Conference regular season championships
- 1977, 1978, 1979, 1980, 1981, 1982, 1997, 1998, 1999, 2000, 2001, 2002, 2004, 2005, 2006, 2010, 2012, 2015, 2017, 2018, 2023, 2026

The SMU Mustangs men's soccer team represents Southern Methodist University in men's college soccer. The team currently competes in the Atlantic Coast Conference. The Mustangs made their most recent appearance in the NCAA Tournament in 2025, when they earned the No. 5 overall seed before falling 1–0 to Washington in the second round. In 2026, the Mustangs won their first ACC regular season title.

The Mustangs have been one of the top men's collegiate sides in the NCAA since being founded in 1975, and are regularly featured in Top 25 polls. The Mustangs were previously coached by Schellas Hyndman, who later became head coach of FC Dallas. Former FC Dallas head coach Luchi Gonzalez played for the Mustangs from 1998 to 2001.

== History ==
The SMU fielded their first soccer team in 1975, coached by Jim Benedek. The Mustangs finished the season with a 14–4–3 record. Benedek remained with the team until 1983.

During the 2006 season, the SMU men's soccer program was ranked No. 1 in the nation for four consecutive weeks. The team sat atop the four national polls with a record of 13-0-2 in the Adidas/NSCA poll, SoccerTimes.com poll, Soccer America Magazine poll, and the CollegeSoccerNews.com poll. Concurrently, the SMU women's soccer program cracked the top 25, at No. 22 in the Adidas/NSCA poll and No. 19 in the SoccerTimes.com poll.

On November 6, 2006, the SMU men's soccer team finished the regular season ranked No. 2 in the nation. Additionally, SMU won the C-USA title game, beating Kentucky 2–0 in Tulsa. This C-USA championship win is the sixth conference title for SMU since 1997.

The SMU men's soccer team finished the 2010 season with an overall record of 16-2-2. The Mustangs finished the season strong with a trip to the Elite Eight where they lost to University of North Carolina at Chapel Hill in a penalty kick shootout.

In 2015, the Mustangs were led by first year head coach Kevin Hudson to the regular season American Athletic Conference title and reached the Round of 16 in the NCAA National Tournament where they were eliminated by Akron 2–1.

The Mustangs finished the 2017 season ranked No. 10 in the Top Drawer Soccer Rankings with an overall record of 17-3-1. They became the first program in American Athletic Conference history to claim the "double", winning both the regular season and conference tournament when they defeated the University of Central Florida 2–1 in Dallas. On January 20, 2018, SMU had two players selected in the 2018 MLS draft with Michael Nelson being selected by the Huston Dynamo with the 20th overall pick and Mauro Cichero being selected by FC Dallas with the 29th overall pick. SMU Defender Jordan Cano signed as a homegrown player for FC Dallas prior to the draft bringing the total to three players entering the MLS from the 2017 team.

In 2018, the Mustangs once again had a first round draft MLS Superdraft Selection as midfielder Emil Cuello was selected 19th overall by the LA Galaxy.

In 2019, the Mustangs claimed their third consecutive American Athletic Conference tournament title defeating Central Florida 1–0 in Orlando. This was the third consecutive year UCF and SMU meet in the AAC Tournament final as the Mustangs claimed their fifth conference title over the last three seasons. In 2017, the Mustangs reached the round of sixteen for the 18th time in program history. In 2017, they also became the first program in American Athletic Conference history to claim both the regular season and conference tournament championship, a feat they repeated in 2018 defeating Temple 2–1 in the final game of the regular season and defeating UCF in a shootout in Orlando in the AAC Tournament Final.

In 2020, the Mustangs had a player taken in the 1st round of the MLS Superdraft for the third consecutive year, as Garrett McLaughlin was selected 8th overall by the Houston Dynamo. Hermann Trophy winner and First-Team All American Eddie Munjoma was also signed to an MLS Homegrown contract by FC Dallas, while defender Phil Ponder was signed to a USL contract by North Texas SC. The Mustangs finished the 2020 campaign ranked at No. 5 in the TopDrawer Soccer Poll, No. 7 in the United Soccer Coaches Poll, and No. 3 in the NCAA RPI Index.

In 2024, the Mustangs reached their fourteenth Elite Eight before falling to No. 13 seed Marshall 3–2.

SMU won their first Atlantic Coast Conference tournament in 2025, after defeating Virginia 1–0 at WakeMed Soccer Park in Cary, North Carolina. The title was SMU's first ACC team championship in any sport. The Mustangs earned the No. 5 overall seed and a first-round bye in the 2025 NCAA tournament, but lost 1–0 to Washington in the second round to finish the season 11–5–4. In the 2026 MLS SuperDraft, Jaylinn Mitchell was selected 23rd overall by Minnesota United FC, the program's first first-round pick since 2021, and Charles-Emile Brunet was selected 80th overall by Nashville SC. ACC Championship MVP Slade Starnes signed a homegrown contract with FC Dallas.

In 2026, SMU was picked fourth in the ACC preseason coaches poll and was ranked No. 15 in the United Soccer Coaches preseason poll. On September 29, 2026, the Mustangs were ranked No. 1 in the United Soccer Coaches Poll for the first time since 2006. They held the top spot for five consecutive weeks.

The Mustangs won the program's first ACC regular season championship outright by going unbeaten in conference play with a 6–0–2 record. They finished the regular season 12–0–3, their first unbeaten regular season since 2001, and were the only unbeaten team in the nation. SMU earned the No. 1 seed and the only first-round bye in the 2026 ACC men's soccer tournament.

== Stadium ==
The Mustangs play their home games at Washburne Soccer and Track Stadium, which has a capacity of 2,577. The stadium was made possible by a $5 million gift from SMU alumni Heather and Ray W. Washburne, announced in the spring of 2020. It replaced Westcott Field, which had been the home of the SMU men's and women's soccer teams since 1994.

== Fans ==
=== Rivalries ===
While SMU is traditionally rivals with TCU, University of Texas at Austin, Texas A&M, Rice, University of Houston and UTEP, these fellow schools do not fund varsity soccer programs, thus hindering the rivalry on the soccer field for the Mustangs. SMU and TCU were rivals when TCU did field a team for many years. TCU's team was an NCAA Division 1 program up until the enforcement of Title IX in the late 1990s to early 2000s.

Due to the enforcement of Title IX, TCU lost their men's division 1 men's soccer program and it was converted to a club team only. TCU does continue to field a women's division 1 program. SMU and TCU played many battles throughout the years for the bragging rights of who was the stronger program in the Dallas/FT Worth metroplex. Generally, they would play one home and one away game against TCU per season. Some of the battles were very close but for the most part SMU was the stronger program due to the fact they had better funding for their soccer program (scholarship money) and thus were able to recruit higher level players. Currently, their main rivals in soccer due to geographic proximity are the Tulsa Golden Hurricane and Midwestern State University in Wichita Falls, Texas.

== Players ==
=== Current roster ===
As of November 4, 2026

Note: Flags indicate national team as defined under FIFA eligibility rules; some limited exceptions apply. Players may hold more than one non-FIFA nationality.

No.	Pos.	Nation	Player
1	GK	USA	Jonathan Evans
2	DF	USA	Ryan Clanton-Pimentel
3	DF	DEN	Villads Landsperg
4	DF	USA	Mason Grimm
5	DF	DEN	Noah Holmstrøm
6	MF	ESP	Alex Salvo
7	MF	USA	Jaylinn Mitchell
8	MF	GHA	Tweneboa Kodua
10	FW	USA	Milton Lopez
11	MF	ARG	Franco Ocaña
12	DF	USA	TJ Dilley
14	DF	USA	Enzo Panozzo
15	MF	USA	Nick Harshaw
16	MF	USA	Landon Hickam
17	MF	USA	Dunes Nielsen
18	GK	USA	Micah Ramirez
19	DF	USA	Joseluis Villagomez

No.	Pos.	Nation	Player
20	FW	UGA	Mukisa Emmanuel
21	MF	USA	Andre Philibbosian
22	DF	USA	Max Sauceda
23	FW	USA	Oliver Knotek
24	FW	USA	Chris Deamon
25	DF	USA	Owen Zarnick
26	MF	USA	Caleb Bronold
27	DF	USA	Ryder Balch
28	DF	USA	Sam Cunniffe
29	GK	USA	Nathan Kinser
30	FW	USA	Stephan Soghomonian
32	DF	USA	Sam Miller
33	FW	USA	Spencer Zachgo
34	FW	USA	Trey Clements
37	GK	USA	Daniel Wozniak

=== Notable alumni ===
==== Current professionals ====
As of November 4, 2026

- (United States) Chase Wileman (2003–2006) – Currently head coach of Brown
- (United States) Michael Nelson (2013–2017) – Currently with FC Tulsa
- (Argentina) Emil Cuello (2015–2018) – Currently with Phoenix Rising FC
- (United States) Garrett McLaughlin (2016–2019) – Currently with Forward Madison FC
- (United States) Nicky Hernandez (2017–2019) – Currently with San Antonio FC
- (United States) Talen Maples (2017–2019) – Currently with New Mexico United
- Nick Taylor (2019–2021) – Currently with Svay Rieng and Cambodia international
- (United States) Bailey Sparks (2021–2024) – Currently with Inter Miami CF II
- (Denmark) Alexander Petræus (2022–2023) – Currently with Fremad Amager
- (United States) Nikola Djordjevic (–2024) – Currently with Vancouver Whitecaps FC
- (United States) Slade Starnes (2025) – Currently with FC Dallas
- Charles-Emile Brunet (2025) – Currently with Nashville SC

== Coaches ==
=== Current staff ===
As of November 4, 2026

Position	Name
Head coach	(United States) Kevin Hudson
Associate Head Coach / Recruiting Coordinator	(United States) Michael King
Associate Head Coach / Goalkeeping	(United States) Jaime Ibarra-Perez
Assistant Coach	(United States) Ross Fitzpatrick

=== All-time head coaches ===
Statistics correct as of the end of the 2025 NCAA Division I men's soccer season

#	Name	Season(s)	GC	OW	OL	OT	O%	CW	CL	CT	C%	PW	PL	PT	RCs	TCs
1	Jim Benedek	1975–1983	165	119	31	15	.767								6	
2	Schellas Hyndman	1984–2007	504	368	96	40	.770								9	6
3	Tim McClements	2008–2014	130	68	46	16	.585								2	1
4	Kevin Hudson	2015–Present	202	126	49	27	.691									

== Titles ==
=== Conference ===
- Conference USA (7): 1997, 1999, 2001, 2003, 2004, 2006, 2011
- American Athletic (3): 2017, 2018, 2019
- Atlantic Coast (1): 2025
