= Jordan Cano =

American soccer player (born 1996)

Personal information
- Date of birth: February 3, 1996 (age 30)
- Place of birth: Dallas, Texas, U.S.
- Height: 6 ft 1 in (1.85 m)
- Position: Defender

Youth career
- 2011–2014: FC Dallas

College career
Years	Team	Apps	(Gls)
2014–2017	SMU Mustangs	75	(6)

Senior career*
Years	Team	Apps	(Gls)
2018–2019	LA Galaxy	0	(0)
2018–2019	→ Oklahoma City Energy (loan)	5	(0)

International career
2012	United States U17	1	(0)
- * Club domestic league appearances and goals as of November 2, 2018

Jordan Cano (born February 3, 1996) is an American soccer player.

== Career ==
=== College ===
Cano played four years of college soccer at Southern Methodist University between 2014 and 2017, making 75 appearances for the Mustangs. He was named American Athletic Conference's Defender of the Year in 2017.

=== Professional ===
After Cano graduated from college, he signed a homegrown player contract with FC Dallas on January 11, 2018. He was loaned to United Soccer League side Oklahoma City Energy on March 16, 2018.

Cano was released by Dallas the end of their 2018 season.
