= Washburne Soccer and Track Stadium =

Soccer & track stadium of Southern Methodist University

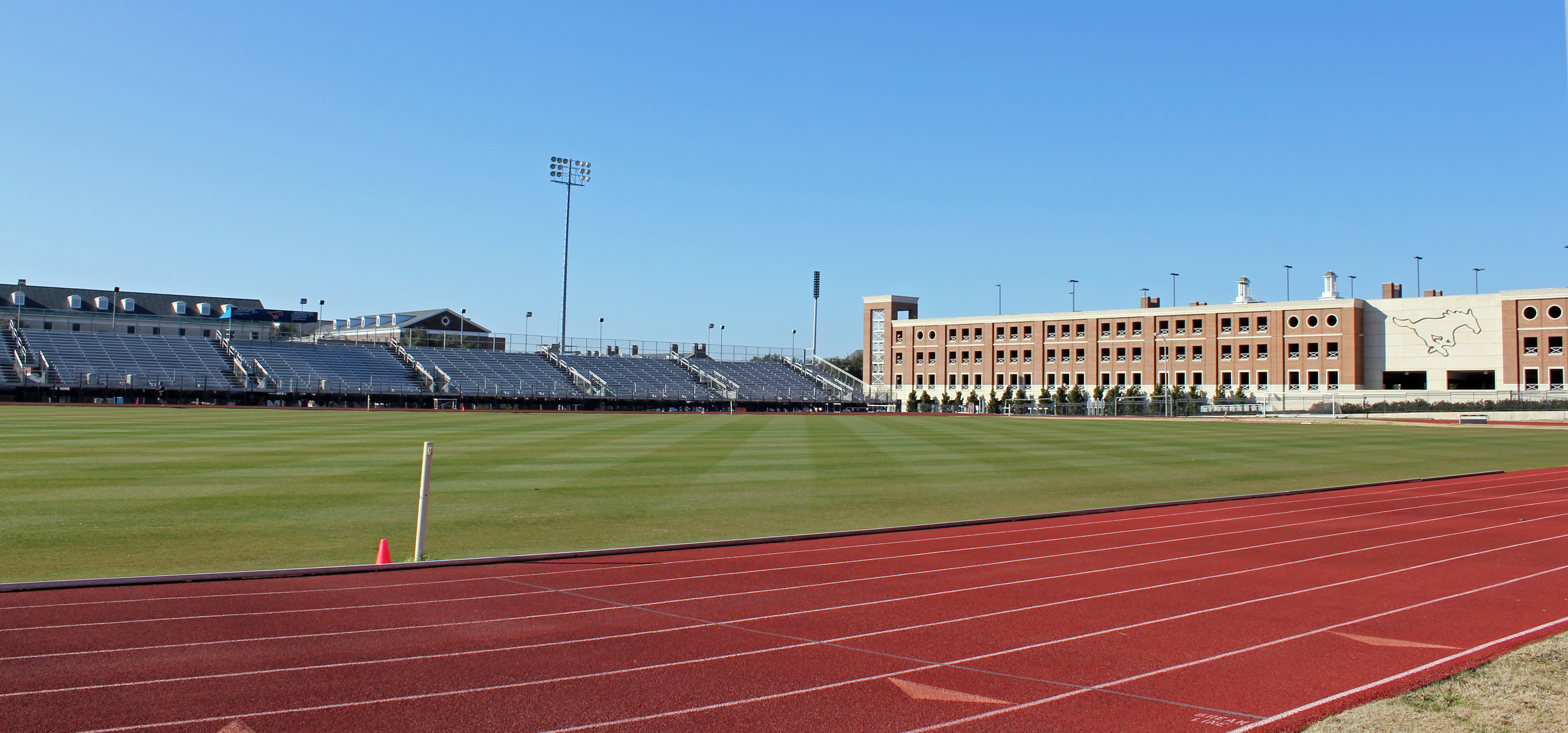
- View of the stadium in 2012
- Interactive map of Washburne Soccer and Track Stadium
- Former names: Westcott Field (1994–2022)
- Location: Dallas, Texas
- Coordinates: 32.839733°N 96.782317°W
- Owner: Southern Methodist University
- Capacity: 2,577

Construction
- Opened: 1994; 32 years ago

Tenants
- SMU Mustangs teams: Men's soccer (1994–present); Women's soccer (1994–present)

Website
- smumustangs.com/washburne-stadium

The Washburne Soccer and Track Stadium (formerly known as Westcott Field) is currently a soccer-specific stadium that is on the campus of Southern Methodist University in University Park, Texas (an enclave of Dallas). It has a capacity of 2,577, and is home to the SMU Mustangs men's and women's soccer teams.

The stadium also has a running track for track and field and other athletics competitions.

== History ==
The stadium opened in 1994 as "Westcott Field". It was used as a training facility during the 1994 FIFA World Cup, hosting The Netherlands, Germany, Bulgaria, and Sweden.

In 2022, the stadium was extensively renovated to include locker rooms, training facilities and new grandstands. It was also renamed after local entrepreneur Ray Washburne and his wife Heather, donors to the project.
