= Deaths in February 2002 =

The following is a list of notable deaths in February 2002.

Entries for each day are listed alphabetically by surname. A typical entry lists information in the following sequence:

- Name, age, country of citizenship at birth, subsequent country of citizenship (if applicable), reason for notability, cause of death (if known), and reference.

== February 2002 ==
=== 1 ===
- Aykut Barka, 50, Turkish earth scientist, traffic collision.
- Sigurd Berge, 72, Norwegian composer.
- Raymond Crapet, 74, French Olympic sprinter (1948).
- Streamline Ewing, 85, American jazz trombonist, worked with Louis Armstrong, Lionel Hampton, Jimmie Lunceford, Cab Calloway.
- James Bruce French, 80, Canadian-American theoretical physicist (Massachusetts Institute of Technology), infection following a stroke.
- Joe Gartner, 90, Australian rugby league footballer.
- Reed Green, 90, American football, basketball and baseball player and coach (Southern Miss Golden Eagles).
- Hildegard Knef, 76, German actress and singer, pneumonia.
- Sperry Marshall, 71, Australian Olympic sports shooter (1972).
- Irish McCalla, 73, American actress (Sheena, Queen of the Jungle) and artist, stroke and complications from brain tumor.
- Betty Moys, 73, English law librarian and indexer.
- Daniel Pearl, 38, American journalist, decapitation.
- Artie Pitt, 88, American Olympic gymnast (1936).
- Vladimir Pyankov, 47, Russian phytophysiologist (Ural State University).
- Norm Reidy, 77, Australian rules footballer (Fitzroy).
- James Ripley, 88, Canadian politician.
- Earl Rowe, 81, American actor.
- Orlando Sierra Hernández, 42, Colombian columnist and journalist, gunshot to the head.
- Robert Granville Stone, 94, American philatelist.
- Stathis Tsanaktsis, 67, Greek footballer.

=== 2 ===
- Khalid Akhtar, 81-82, Pakistani Urdu-language writer.
- Henry Aldridge, 78, American dentist and politician, member of the North Carolina House of Representatives (1995–1999).
- Paul Baloff, 41, American vocalist (Exodus), heart failure.
- Claude Brown, 64, American author (Manchild in the Promised Land).
- Mende Brown, 81, American writer, producer and director, heart attack.
- Gerry Dialungana, 51, Congolese musician (TPOK Jazz).
- Hugo O. Engelmann, 84, Austrian-born American sociologist, anthropologist and general systems theorist.
- Andy Hansen, 77, American baseball player (New York Giants, Philadelphia Phillies).
- Ian Clark Hutchison, 99, British politician, MP (1941–1959).
- Ed Jucker, 85, American basketball coach (1961 and 1962 NCAA titles at Cincinnati) and baseball coach, prostate cancer.
- Robin Medforth-Mills, 59, English geographer (University of Durham) and United Nations official.
- Ani Pachen, 68, Tibetan freedom fighter, activist and author, known as Tibet's "warrior nun".
- Chatchai Paiseetong, 28, Thai Muay Thai fighter, two-time Lumpinee Stadium Super Bantamweight Champion, heart failure.
- Remo Palmier, 78, American jazz guitarist (Coleman Hawkins, Charlie Parker, Billie Holiday).
- Beatrice Gilman Proske, 102, American art historian.
- Oscar Reutersvärd, 86, Swedish graphic artist.
- Kermit Scott, 87, American jazz tenor saxophonist.
- Yvon Thébert, 58, French archaeologist and historian.

=== 3 ===
- Mazahir Abasov, 83, Azerbaijani historian and military pilot.
- Yahya Adl, 95, Iranian surgeon, considered the father of modern Iranian surgery.
- James Blackwood, 82, American Gospel singer (The Blackwood Brothers).
- Kay Brownbill, 87, Australian media personality and politician.
- K. Chakravarthy, 65, Indian music director.
- Edward Thomas Chapman, 82, Welsh World War II British Army corporal and recipient of the Victoria Cross.
- Rudolf Fleischmann, 98, German nuclear physicist.
- Raymond Gérôme, 81, Belgian-French stage and screen actor.
- Bill Harvey, 82, English football player.
- Margit Lukács, 87, Hungarian stage and film actress (Dankó Pista, Matthew Arranges Things, A Plane Has Not Returned).
- André Maes, 84, Belgian Olympic sailor (1960).
- Mel McGaha, 75, American baseball coach, manager, and basketball player (New York Knicks).
- Hans Paetsch, 92, German actor.
- William Poy, 94, Australian-born Canadian civil servant and businessman.
- Clifford Ladd Prosser, 94, American physiologist (University of Illinois at Urbana–Champaign).
- András Rapcsák, 58, Hungarian engineer and politician, MP (1994–2002) and mayor of Hódmezővásárhely (1990–2002), pulmonary embolism.
- Julien Rassam, 33, French actor, suicide.
- Charles Reep, 97, English football analyst, creator of the long ball game.
- Lucien Rivard, 87, Canadian criminal, known for a prison escape with a water hose in 1965.
- Nelson Royal, 66, American professional wrestler, trainer and promoter, heart attack.
- Vyacheslav Sazonov, 66, Russian mathematician (Sazonov's theorem).
- Aglaja Veteranyi, 39, Romanian-Swiss writer, suicide by drowning.
- Donald Erwin Wilson, 69, American Navy admiral, cancer.

=== 4 ===
- Abie Ames, 83, American blues and jazz pianist.
- Hugo Baralis, 87, Argentine violinist, conductor, and arranger.
- Agatha Barbara, 78, Maltese politician.
- Sigvard Bernadotte, 94, Swedish prince.
- Frederick J. Clarke, 86, US Army lieutenant General as Chief of Engineers.
- Sarah Clarke, 82, Irish nun and civil rights campaigner.
- Tom Connors, 67, English cancer research scientist.
- Bhagwan Dada, 88, Indian actor and film director, heart attack.
- Ralph Fritz, 84, American gridiron football player (University of Michigan, Philadelphia Eagles).
- Wiesław Gąsiorek, 66, Polish tennis player.
- Reg Gross, 91, Australian rules footballer (Geelong).
- Miloslav Hamr, 85, Czechoslovak table tennis player.
- Bert Head, 85, English football player and manager.
- Inge Konradi, 77, Austrian stage and film actress, cancer.
- Harry David Link, 84, Canadian politician, member of the Legislative Assembly of Saskatchewan (1964–1967).
- George Nader, 80, American actor (Six Bridges to Cross, Lady Godiva of Coventry, Sins of Jezebel), cardiopulmonary failure.
- Helen Dodson Prince, 96, American astronomer.
- Carlos Roque, 78, Portuguese Olympic rower (1948).
- Broderick Thompson, 41, American gridiron football player (Kansas, San Diego Chargers), traffic collision.
- Eve Titus, 79, American children's writer.
- Gyula Vincze, 88, Hungarian Olympic wrestler (1936).
- Baxter Ward, 82, American television news anchor and two-term member of Los Angeles County Board of Supervisors.

=== 5 ===
- Angela du Maurier, 97, English actress and novelist.
- Yasutake Funakoshi, 89, Japanese sculptor and painter.
- Paul Grabö, 83, Swedish politician, MP (1971–1973).
- André Jacowski, 80, Polish-born French football player (Stade de Reims, French national team).
- Mushtak Ali Kazi, 84, Pakistani jurist and writer, cardiac arrest.
- Kauko Lusenius, 83, Finnish Olympic middle-distance runner (1952).
- Raymond Martorano, 74, Italian-American mobster (Philadelphia crime family), shot.
- Robert Mather, 87, Australian politician.
- Victor Miadana, 81, Malagasy politician, Vice President of Madagascar (1971–1972).
- John Spezzaferro, 80, American football player and coach (Heidelberg College).
- Boris Tamm, 71, Estonian cyberneticist, rector of the Tallinn University of Technology (1976–1991).
- Annalee Whitmore Fadiman, 85, American screenwriter (Andy Hardy Meets Debutante, Babes in Arms) and World War II foreign correspondent, euthanasia.

=== 6 ===
- Osman Bölükbaşı, Turkish politician and political party leader, respiratory failure.
- Angela D'Audney, 57, New Zealand television news anchor and actress, brain tumour.
- Grietje de Jongh, 77, Dutch Olympic sprinter (1948, 1952).
- Sırrı Erinç, 84, Turkish geographer and lecturer.
- Leonid Hakobyan, 65, Soviet and Armenian politician and economist.
- Hazel Hannell, 106, American artist and activist.
- Jack Holden, 80, Australian politician, member of the Victorian Legislative Assembly (1955–1967).
- Andrée Jacob, 95, French journalist and member of the French Resistance.
- Wendell Marshall, 81, American jazz double-bassist.
- Eken Mine, 66, Japanese voice actor.
- Max Perutz, 87, Austrian-born British molecular biologist, and co-winner of the 1962 Nobel Prize for Chemistry, cancer.
- Yehoshua Rozin, 83, Israeli basketball coach.
- Lowell Schoenfeld, 81, American mathematician.
- Guy Stockwell, 68, American actor (Adventures in Paradise, Beau Geste, The Richard Boone Show), complications from diabetes.
- Samuel Lucien Terrien, 90, French-American theologian and biblical scholar (Union Theological Seminary).
- Herbert Wieninger, 91, Austrian Olympic composer (1936 Summer Olympics).
- Lady Viola Wilson, 90, Scottish-born Australian opera singer.
- Melinda Wortz, 61, American art historian and critic, Alzheimer's disease.

=== 7 ===
- Annemarie Auer, 88, German author and literary scholar.
- Walter Bolden, 76, American jazz drummer
- Elisa Bridges, 28, American actress and model, Playboy magazine's Playmate of the Month for December 1994, drug overdose.
- Bertrand Croset, 60, French Olympic bobsledder (1968).
- Lilí del Mónico, Swiss-born Paraguayan artist.
- Ellen Demming, 79, American actress (Guiding Light).
- Jack Fairman, 88, British Formula One driver.
- David Gibson-Watt, Baron Gibson-Watt, 83, British politician.
- John Groves Gould, 89, Canadian politician, MLA (1949–1952).
- Diane Hart, 75, English actress and political campaigner.
- Bud Helbig, 82, American painter, illustrator and sculptor.
- Lorne Henderson, 81, Canadian politician.
- César Jaroslavsky, 73, Argentinian politician, MP (1983–1991).
- Wilhelm Johnen, 80, German Luftwaffe night fighter ace during World War II.
- Jerrold Katz, 69, American philosopher and linguist.
- Tony Pond, 56, British rally driver, pancreatic cancer.
- William Rupp, 74, American architect, house fire.
- John Taylor, Baron Ingrow, 84, English soldier, brewer and politician, Parkinson's disease.
- Rosemary Woodruff Leary, 66, American model and author, wife of Timothy Leary, congestive heart failure.

=== 8 ===
- Elisabeth Mann Borgese, 83, German-Canadian environmentalist, political scientist and writer, pneumonia.
- Nick Brignola, 65, American jazz saxophonist.
- Ong Teng Cheong, 66, Singaporean politician and fifth President of Singapore (1993-1999), lymphoma.
- Puck de Leeuw, 48, Dutch documentary director, lung cancer.
- William T. Dillard, 87, American retailer (Dillard's Department Stores).
- Maurice Foley, 76, British politician (Member of Parliament for West Bromwich).
- AG Fronzoni, 78, Italian graphic designer, publisher, industrial designer, architect, and educator.
- Joachim Hoffmann, 71, German historian.
- John Mark Inienger, 56, Nigerian Army major general, traffic collision.
- Lloyd Kiva New, 85, American Cherokee artist and designer.
- Jacob Lofman, 90, Polish-born American photojournalist.
- Esther Afua Ocloo, 82, Ghanaian entrepreneur and pioneer of microlending, pneumonia.
- Grigory Okhay, 85, Soviet MiG-15 flying ace during the Korean War.
- Giannis Pathiakakis, 48, Greek football player, heart attack.
- Stan Pavko, 85, American football player and coach (Modesto Pirates).
- David Pyle, 65, English football player (Bristol Rovers, Bristol City, Trowbridge Town).
- Mu'nis Razzaz, 51, Jordanian writer, brother of Jordanian prime minister Omar Razzaz.
- Duggie Reid, 84, Scottish football player.
- Steve Roser, 84, American baseball player (New York Yankees, Boston Braves).
- Eldon Rudd, 81, American politician, member of the United States House of Representatives (1977-1987).
- Heinz Traimer, 80, German-born Austrian graphic designer.
- Henry Williams Jr., 85, American golfer.
- Bob Wooler, 76, British disc jockey, known for introducing The Beatles to future manager, Brian Epstein.
- Zizinho, 80, Brazilian football player, heart attack.
- Antar Zouabri, 31, Algerian islamist, shot.

=== 9 ===
- Miroslav Adlešič, 94, Slovene physicist.
- Michael Joseph Begley, 92, American prelate of the Roman Catholic Church.
- Hung Wai Ching, 96, Chinese-American businessman (Aloha Airlines), cancer.
- Paul Cornely, 95, American physician, public health pioneer, and civil rights activist, first African American to earn a doctoral degree in public health.
- John Dowling, 70, Irish Gaelic football and hurling referee, President of the Gaelic Athletic Association (1988–1991).
- Richard Herbert Foote, 83, American entomologist.
- Sarah Fraser Robbins, 90, American writer, educator and environmentalist.
- Fred Gehrke, 83, American football player (Los Angeles Rams) and executive (Denver Broncos).
- Birkin Haward, 89, English architect, antiquarian, author and artist.
- Isabelle Holland, 81, American children's author.
- Arne Jensen, 87, Norwegian banker.
- Maria Laqua, 112, German supercentenarian, at the time oldest verified person ever in Germany.
- John Ingvar Lövgren, 71, Swedish serial killer, cancer.
- Bill McElhiney, 87, American musician, band leader, and musical director, Alzheimer's disease.
- Elisabeth Luce Moore, 98, American philanthropist, educator, and volunteer, sister of Henry R. Luce.
- Joanna Nickrenz, 65, American record producer, lung cancer.
- Walter Orlinsky, 63, American politician, president of the Baltimore City Council (1971–1982), cancer.
- Judson Pratt, 85, American character actor.
- Vesta M. Roy, 76, American politician.
- Vicente Sardinero, 65, Spanish operatic baritone singer.
- Princess Margaret, Countess of Snowdon, 71, British royal and sister of Queen Elizabeth II, stroke.
- Ale Ahmad Suroor, 90, Indian poet and critic.
- Peggy Taylor, 74, American singer and television announcer.
- Chris Vierira, 76, American baseball player.
- Clyde E. Wood, 83, American politician, member of the Mississippi House of Representatives (1968–1976).
- Oleg Zhukov, 28, Russian singer and rapper, brain tumor.

=== 10 ===
- Jack Abbott, 58, American criminal and author (In the Belly of the Beast), suicide by hanging.
- Leslie Barnett, 81, British microbiologist.
- Dominique Barthélemy, 80, French Dominican priest and biblical scholar.
- Chet Clemens, 84, American baseball player (Boston Bees/Braves).
- Bob Davids, 75, American baseball researcher and writer, bladder cancer.
- Gonzalo Fernández de la Mora, 77, Spanish essayist and politician.
- John Erickson, 72, British historian, a leading authority on the Soviet Union and Russia.
- Ramón Arellano Félix, 37, Mexican drug lord, shot.
- Joseph Humphrey, 71, American politician, member of the Florida House of Representatives (1966–1968).
- Akira Ishikawa, 67, Japanese jazz drummer and bandleader, cerebral hemorrhage.
- Traudl Junge, 81, German secretary who took Adolf Hitler's last will and testament (Blind Spot: Hitler's Secretary), lung cancer.
- Jagdish Mandal, 84, Indian politician, MP (1971–1977).
- Ragnar Margeirsson, 39, Icelandic football player (Keflavik, KR Reykjavik, Sturm Graz).
- Else Poulsson, 92, Norwegian painter and textile artist.
- Syed Ali Akhtar Rizvi, 53, Indian Shī'ah scholar, historian, author and poet.
- Ray Smith, 82, Australian politician, MLA (1957–1969).
- Lotte Specht, 90, German football player, founder of the first women's football club in Germany.
- Jim Spencer, 54, American baseball player (Chicago White Sox, New York Yankees, Oakland Athletics), heart attack.
- Dan R. Tonkovich, 55, American politician. (body discovered on this date)
- Dave Van Ronk, 65, American folk singer, and an important figure in New York City's Greenwich Village scene in the 1960s, colorectal cancer.
- Vernon A. Walters, 85, American U.S. Army officer and diplomat (Deputy Director of the C.I.A., U.S. Ambassador to the United Nations).

=== 11 ===
- Ronnie Abeysinghe, 65, Sri Lankan civil servant, Serjeant-at-Arms of the Sri Lankan Parliament (1970–1996).
- Boriss Berziņš, 71, Latvian artist.
- Mary Brooks, 94, American director of the United States Mint from 1969 to 1977.
- Ralph Buchsbaum, 95, American zoologist, ecologist and author (Animals Without Backbones).
- Frankie Crosetti, 91, American baseball player (New York Yankees) and coach (New York Yankees, Seattle Pilots, Minnesota Twins).
- Barry Foster, 74, British actor, heart attack.
- Govinda Harishankar, 43, Indian kanjira player, lung cancer.
- George A. Kasem, 82, American politician (U.S. Representative for California's 25th congressional district), pneumonia.
- Leif Larsson, 73, Swedish Olympic sports shooter (1960, 1964, 1968).
- Mikhail Leitman, 65, Soviet-born Israeli scientist and IT specialist.
- Karen Marie Løwert, 88, Danish actress (Life on the Hegn Farm, Onkel Bill fra New York, Once There Was a War)
- Les Peden, 78, American baseball player (Washington Senators).
- Victor Posner, 83, American businessman, tycoon and corporate raider, pneumonia.
- Cliff Schmautz, 62, Canadian hockey player (Philadelphia Flyers, Buffalo Sabres, Portland Buckaroos), complications from heart surgery.
- Gaetano Stammati, 93, Italian politician.
- Frans Van Coetsem, 82, Belgian-born American linguist, cancer.

=== 12 ===
- Theresa Bernstein, 111, Polish-American artist and writer.
- Barbara May Cameron, 47, American human rights activist.
- John Dubetz, 85, Canadian politician, MLA (1959–1963).
- William Lee Dwyer, 72, American federal judge (U.S. District Judge of the U.S. District Court for the Western District of Washington).
- George Eiferman, 76, American bodybuilder, won Mr.Universe in 1962.
- John Eriksen, 44, Danish footballer, fall.
- Marie Gibeau, 51, Canadian politician, MP (1988–1993).
- Rufus D. Hayes, 88, American politician.
- Jim Higgins, 83, American basketball and baseball player.
- Clarrie Hindson, 94, Australian rules footballer (St Kilda).
- Ossie Johnson, 95, New Zealand athlete (1930 British Empire Games).
- Erna Low, 92, Austrian-born British businesswoman.
- Flip McDonald, 81, American football player (Philadelphia Eagles, Brooklyn Tigers, New York Yankees).
- Reg Morgan, 82, Australian rules footballer (Carlton).
- Idé Oumarou, 65, Nigerien diplomat, government minister, and journalist, heart attack.
- Michele Pantaleone, 90, Italian journalist, politician and mafia expert.
- Atowar Rahman, 74, Bangladeshi writer, researcher and multilingualist.
- Mátyás Tóth, 83, Hungarian football player (Újpest, Vasas, Hungary national team).
- José Travassos, 75, Portuguese football player.
- Margaret Traxler, 77, American religious sister and activist.

=== 13 ===
- George Bray, 83, English footballer.
- Bob Gerber, 85, American basketball player.
- Mike Gilbert, 90, New Zealand rugby player.
- Ramón Grosso, 58, Spanish footballer, cancer.
- Carlos Aboim Inglez, 72, Portuguese communist intellectual, militant and politician.
- Waylon Jennings, 64, American country music performer, actor, and disc jockey, diabetes.
- Dick Kleiner, 80, American entertainment columnist and journalist.
- Manfred Kuschmann, 51, East German long-distance runner.
- Edmar Mednis, 64, American chess grandmaster, complications from pneumonia.
- Paul Sartorius, 89, French Olympic field hockey player (1936).
- Thomas J. H. Trapnell, 99, American U.S. Army lieutenant general.
- Pauline Trigère, 93, French-American fashion designer.
- Sidney Weighell, 79, British footballer, trade unionist and the General Secretary of the National Union of Railwaymen.

=== 14 ===
- Domènec Balmanya, 87, Spanish football midfielder and manager.
- J. Desmond Clark, 85, British-American archeologist, anthropologist and author, pneumonia.
- Gene Cook, 70, American professional football player (Detroit Lions), minor league baseball executive and elected official in Toledo, Ohio.
- Norman Davidson, 85, American molecular biologist, a major figure in advancing genome research.
- Geneviève de Gaulle-Anthonioz, 81, French member of the resistance during WW II.
- Nándor Hidegkuti, 79, Hungarian football player, manager, and Olympian (1952).
- A. J. Kardar, 75, Pakistani film director, producer and screenwriter.
- Grover Krantz, 70, American anthropologist and cryptozoologist, known as a Bigfoot researcher, pancreatic cancer.
- Bud Olson, 76, Canadian politician, Lieutenant Governor of Alberta.
- John Stevens, 80, English musicologist, literary scholar and historian.
- Mick Tucker, 54, English drummer for the glam rock band Sweet, leukemia.
- Günter Wand, 90, German orchestra conductor.

=== 15 ===
- Doug Cash, 82, Australian politician.
- Mike Darr, 25, American baseball player (San Diego Padres), traffic collision.
- Munro S. Edmonson, 77, American linguist and anthropologist.
- Lucille Lund, 88, American film actress (The Black Cat).
- Ke Pauk, 68, Cambodian leader of the Khmer Rouge.
- Jacques Roulot, 68, French fencer and Olympian (1956, 1960).
- Howard K. Smith, 87, American television anchorman and political commentator, pneumonia.
- Kevin Smith, 38, New Zealand actor, (Xena: Warrior Princess, Young Hercules), fall.
- Louis Verbruggen, 73, Belgian footballer.
- Garry Weston, 74, Canadian businessman (Associated British Foods).

=== 16 ===
- Tommy Joe Crutcher, 60, American professional football player (TCU, Green Bay Packers, New York Giants).
- Norman Davis, 56, American football player (Baltimore Colts, New Orleans Saints, Philadelphia Eagles).
- John W. Gardner, 89, American public servant, U.S. Secretary of H.E.W., cancer.
- Peter Voulkos, 78, American ceramist, heart attack.
- Walter Winterbottom, 88, British football manager, first full-time manager of the England football team, surgical complications.

=== 17 ===
- Anthony Benjamin, 70, English painter and sculptor.
- Ross Dowson, 84, Canadian Trotskyist politician.
- Ehtesham, 74, Bangladeshi and Pakistani film director.
- Paterson Ewen, 76, Canadian painter and sculptor, known for his cosmological images.
- Lev Kulidzhanov, 77, Soviet film director and screenwriter, stroke.
- Johann Liebenberger, 71, Austrian Olympic water polo player (1952).

=== 18 ===
- Gerald Bird, 74, Trinidadian Olympic sailor (1960).
- Giustino Durano, 78, Italian actor (Life Is Beautiful).
- Jack Lambert, 81, American actor.
- Mohammed Dabo Lere, Nigerian politician.
- Gabriel Mariano, 73, Cape Verdean writer.
- Warren A. Morton, 77, American politician.
- Byrne Piven, 72, American actor (Being John Malkovich, Miracle on 34th Street, Very Bad Things), lung cancer.
- José Ortega Spottorno, 85, Spanish journalist and publisher.

=== 19 ===
- Sal Bartolo, 84, American boxer and WBA featherweight champion.
- Lila De Nobili, 85, Italian stage designer, costume designer, and fashion illustrator.
- Otto Eisenmann, 88, German politician and member of the Bundestag.
- Virginia Hamilton, 67, American children's book author, breast cancer.
- Swede Hanson, 68, American professional wrestler, sepsis.
- Rashid Ahmad Ludhianvi, 79, Pakistani Islamic scholar and faqīh.
- Sylvia Rivera, 50, American gay liberation and transgender activist, liver cancer.
- Gene Ruggiero, 91, American film editor.
- Arne Selmosson, 70, Swedish football player and manager.
- William Davis Taylor, 93, American newspaper executive and publisher of The Boston Globe.

=== 20 ===
- Laura duPont, 52, American tennis player, 1977 U.S. Clay Court Champion, breast cancer.
- Dennis Kelleher, 83, Irish football player and Olympian (1948).
- Stephen Longstreet, 94, American writer and artist.
- Edwin H. May, Jr., 77, American businessman and politician.
- Jean Oser, 94, German-American film editor.
- Branko Stanković, 80, Bosnian Serb footballer, manager, and Olympian (1948, 1952).
- Fredric Steinkamp, 73, American film editor (Grand Prix, Tootsie, Out of Africa), Oscar winner (1967).
- Willie Thrower, 71, American gridiron football player (Michigan State, Chicago Bears), heart attack.

=== 21 ===
- A. L. Barker, 83, British author.
- Laudomia Bonanni, 94, Italian writer and journalist.
- Roden Cutler, 85, Australian diplomat and Governor of New South Wales.
- Bill Faul, 61, American baseball player (Detroit Tigers, Chicago Cubs, San Francisco Giants).
- Harold Furth, 72, Austrian-American physicist and a leader in controlled fusion research, heart attack.
- Pietro Grossi, 84, Italian computer music pioneer, visual artist and hacker.
- Trevor Hampton, 89, British diver.
- Leroy Milton Kelly, 87, American mathematician.
- Harold Pruett, 32, American actor (The Outsiders), accidental drug overdose.
- John Thaw, 60, British actor (Inspector Morse, The Sweeney, Kavanagh QC), cancer.
- Georges Vedel, 91, French public law professor.
- Harold Weisberg, 88, American civil servant, investigative reporter and author.

=== 22 ===
- Paddy Ambrose, 73, Irish football player and coach.
- Maria Corti, 86, Italian philologist, literary critic, and novelist.
- Vyacheslav Dryagin, 61, Soviet Olympic skier (1964, 1968, 1972).
- Raymond Firth, 100, British anthropologist.
- Edwin F. Hunter, 91, American district judge (United States District Court for the Western District of Louisiana).
- Chuck Jones, 89, American animator, creator of Wile E. Coyote and the Road Runner, heart failure.
- Francisco Mora, 79, Mexican artist of the "Mexican School" of mural painters.
- Joaquim Olmos, 86, Spanish racing cyclist.
- Poncke Princen, 76, Dutch anti-Nazi fighter during World War II and activist.
- Jonas Malheiro Savimbi, 67, Angolan revolutionary, leader of UNITA, shot.
- Barbara Valentin, 61, Austrian actress, cerebral hemorrhage.
- Ronnie Verrell, 76, English jazz drummer.

=== 23 ===
- Marcel Couttet, 89, French Olympic ice hockey player (1936).
- Franz Elbern, 91, German footballer and Olympian (1936).
- Bernd Hartstein, 54, German Olympic sport shooter (1976, 1980), and trainer, leukemia.
- Willys Heyliger, 76, Curaçaoan footballer and Olympian (1952).
- Peaches Jackson, 88, American film actress.
- Gordon Matthews, 65, American inventor and businessman, considered the father of "voice mail", stroke.
- Prathyusha, 20, Indian actress, suicide by poisoning.
- Ryszard Przybysz, 52, Polish Olympic handball player (1976).
- Tito Sawe, 41, Kenyan Olympic sprinter (1988).

=== 24 ===
- Martin Esslin, 83, Hungarian-British producer, dramatist, and journalist, Parkinson's disease.
- David Hawkins, 88, American philosopher and historian of the Manhattan Project.
- Ellis Jones, 80, American football player (Boston Yanks).
- Stanislav Libenský, 80, Czech contemporary artist.
- Arthur Lyman, 70, American jazz vibraphone and marimba player ("Yellow Bird"), esophageal cancer.
- Leo Ornstein, 106, Russian-born American experimental composer and pianist.
- Mel Stewart, 72, American actor, television director, and musician, Alzheimer's disease.
- Robert Strausz-Hupé, 98, American diplomat (U.S. Ambassador to: Sri Lanka, Belgium, Sweden, NATO, Turkey).
- Hela Yungst, 52, Israeli-American actress (Guiding Light, All My Children) and beauty pageant winner, cancer.

=== 25 ===
- Clint Alberta, 32, Canadian filmmaker, suicide by jumping.
- Claire Davenport, 68, English actress, kidney failure.
- António Dembo, 57, Angolan anti-communist revolutionary, leader of UNITA, killed in action.
- Clive L. DuVal II, 89, American politician and lawyer, cancer.
- Afaq Hussain, 62, Pakistani cricketer.
- Kim Refshammer, 46, Danish Olympic cyclist (1976).

=== 26 ===
- L. Balaraman, 70, Indian politician, MP (1984–1991, 1996–1998).
- Werner Grothmann, 86, German Waffen-SS officer during World War II and aide-de-camp to Heinrich Himmler.
- Greg Losey, 52, American Olympic modern pentathlete (1984).
- Helen Megaw, 94, Irish crystallographer.
- Oskar Sala, 91, German physicist, composer and a pioneer of electronic music (The Birds).
- Lawrence Tierney, 82, American actor (Dillinger, The Greatest Show on Earth, Reservoir Dogs), pneumonia.
- Kenichi Yamamoto, 79, Japanese Olympic cross-country skier (1952).
- Tony Young, 64, American actor (Gunslinger, General Hospital, Star Trek), lung cancer.

=== 27 ===
- Georges Beaucourt, 89, French football player.
- Tord Godal, 92, Norwegian theologian and bishop for the Diocese of Nidaros.
- Warren Harding, 77, American rock climber.
- Spike Milligan, 83, Irish actor, comedian and writer (The Goon Show), kidney failure.
- Dykes Potter, 91, American baseball player (Brooklyn Dodgers).
- Kosta Angeli Radovani, 85, Croatian sculptor and member of the Croatian Academy of Sciences and Arts.
- Robert W. Rosenthal, 57, American economist (Boston University), heart attack.
- Surajit Chandra Sinha, Indian anthropologist.

=== 28 ===
- Janice Cooper, 62, Australian Olympic high jumper (1956).
- Ehsan Jafri, Indian politician, killed by a mob.
- Charley Riffle, 84, American football player (Cleveland Rams, New York Yankees).
- Mary Stuart, 75, American actress (Search for Tomorrow), bone cancer, stroke.
- John Russell Taylor, 84, Canadian politician, member of the House of Commons of Canada (1957-1962).
- Helmut Tepasse, 55, German Olympic gymnast (1968).
- Helmut Zacharias, 82, German violinist and composer, Alzheimer's disease.
