= Grabo =

Grabo may refer to:

- Grabo (surname)
- Grabo, Ivory Coast
- Gråbo, Sweden
- GRABO - an electronic lifting tool by Nemo Power Tools.

== See also ==
- Grabos (disambiguation)
- Grabow (disambiguation)
