= Sırrı =

Sırrı (Turkish for "secret of") is a Turkish masculine given name that denotes someone who can keep a secret. Notable people with this name include:

- Sırrı Acar (born 1943), Turkish wrestler
- Sırrı Atalay (1919–1985), Turkish civil servant and politician
- Sırrı Erinç (1918–2002), Turkish geographer and lecturer
- Sırrı Süreyya Önder (1962–2025), Turkish film director, actor, screenwriter, columnist and politician
- Sırrı Sakık (born 1957), Turkish-Kurdish journalist and politician, elected mayor of Ağrı
- Selim Sırrı Tarcan (1874–1957), Ottoman-Turkish educator, sports official and politician

== See also ==
- Giritli Sırrı Pasha (1844–1895), a 19th-century Ottoman administrator and man of letters
- Hussein Sirri Pasha (1894–1960), an Egyptian politician, son of Ismail
- Ismail Sirri Pasha (1861–1937), an Egyptian engineer and politician
