= Fafnir (disambiguation) =

Fáfnir is a worm in Germanic folklore who is killed by a member of the Völsung family.

Fafnir or Fafner may also refer to:

== Technology and engineering ==
- Bramo 323 Fafnir, a German radial piston aero-engine
- Fafnir (automobile), a German car and motor cycle manufacturer
- The Fafnir Bearing Company, a major American manufacturer of ball bearings.
- RRG Fafnir, a German pre-WW II high-performance glider
- RRG Fafnir 2, a single seat German high performance glider

== Fiction ==
- Fafnir (Marvel Comics), an Asgardian monster and foe of the Thunder God Thor
- Fafner in the Azure, a Japanese anime series
- Fafnir, a planet in Larry Niven's Known Space universe
- Fighting Fefnir, a character in the Mega Man Zero series
- Fafnir, playable character in Smite (video game)

== Other ==
- Fafnir (journal), a Nordic Journal of Science Fiction and Fantasy Research
- Fafnir, the star 42 Draconis
- Fafner (typeface) a typeface cut by Schelter & Giesecke Type Foundry in 1905 and revived by Oliver Weiss as WF Fafner in 2020.
- Drain Fafnir, Geist Fafnir, Wizard Fafnir, Mirage Fafnir and Vanish Fafnir, are Beyblade Burst
