= Leitman =

Leitman or Leitmann is a surname. Notable people with the surname include:

- Elizabeth Leitman, American meteorologist
- I. Michael Leitman (born 1959), American surgeon
- Mikhail Leitman (1937–2002), Azerbaijani scientist
- Matthew F. Leitman (born 1968), American judge
- George Leitmann (1925–2025), Austrian-born American scientist and educator
