= Christophia triceratops =

Scientific classification
- Domain: Eukaryota
- Kingdom: Animalia
- Phylum: Arthropoda
- Class: Insecta
- Order: Lepidoptera
- Family: Pyralidae
- Genus: Christophia
- Species: C. triceratops

Binomial name
- Christophia triceratops Falkovitsh, 1999

Species of moth

Christophia triceratops is a species of snout moth in the genus Christophia. It was described by Mark I. Falkovitsh in 1999 and is known from Uzbekistan.

The larvae have been recorded feeding on Climacoptera species.
