= Richmond Spiders =

Collegiate sports club in the United States

- University: University of Richmond
- Conference: Atlantic 10 (primary); Patriot League (football)
- NCAA: Division I (FCS)
- Athletic director: John P. Hardt
- Location: Richmond, Virginia
- Varsity teams: 16
- Football stadium: E. Claiborne Robins Stadium
- Basketball arena: Robins Center
- Baseball stadium: Malcolm U. Pitt Field
- Mascot: WebstUR
- Nickname: Spiders
- Colors: Blue and red
- Website: richmondspiders.com

The Richmond Spiders represent the University of Richmond in Richmond, Virginia. The Spiders compete in the Division I FCS of the National Collegiate Athletic Association as a member of the Atlantic 10 Conference for most sports.

== The Spider name ==
From 1876 through the early 1890s, Richmond's sports teams were known as the "Colts", reportedly for their play as an "energetic group of young colts." At some point variously reported as 1892, 1893, or 1894, the school's athletic teams took on the "Spiders" name. The origins of the name are somewhat uncertain, an apocryphal version describes a baseball team composed of Richmond students and city residents that was said to have taken on the "Spiders" name after Ragland Chesterman of the Richmond Times-Dispatch used the term to refer to pitcher Puss Ellyson's lanky arms and stretching kick. This story is not true, as the Richmond Times-Dispatch did not exist until 1903. And while Ragland Chesterman did write for the Richmond Times, he wrote a society column, not sports news. It is most likely the team took the nickname from the Cleveland Spiders who, at the time, were highly successful. To this day, Richmond is the only university in the United States with the spider as its official nickname.

== Sports sponsored ==
Men's sports	Women's sports
Baseball	Basketball
Basketball	Cross country
Cross country	Field hockey
Football	Golf
Golf	Lacrosse
Lacrosse	Soccer
Tennis	Swimming and diving
	Tennis
	Track and field^{1}
^{1} – includes both indoor and outdoor

=== Baseball ===
The University of Richmond baseball team is coached by Mik Aoki, who was hired in 2023. The Spiders have qualified for the NCAA Tournament eight times, including a Super Regional appearance in 2002, with the last tournament appearance coming in 2003.

The Spiders play their home games at Malcolm U. Pitt Field on campus.

=== Men's basketball ===
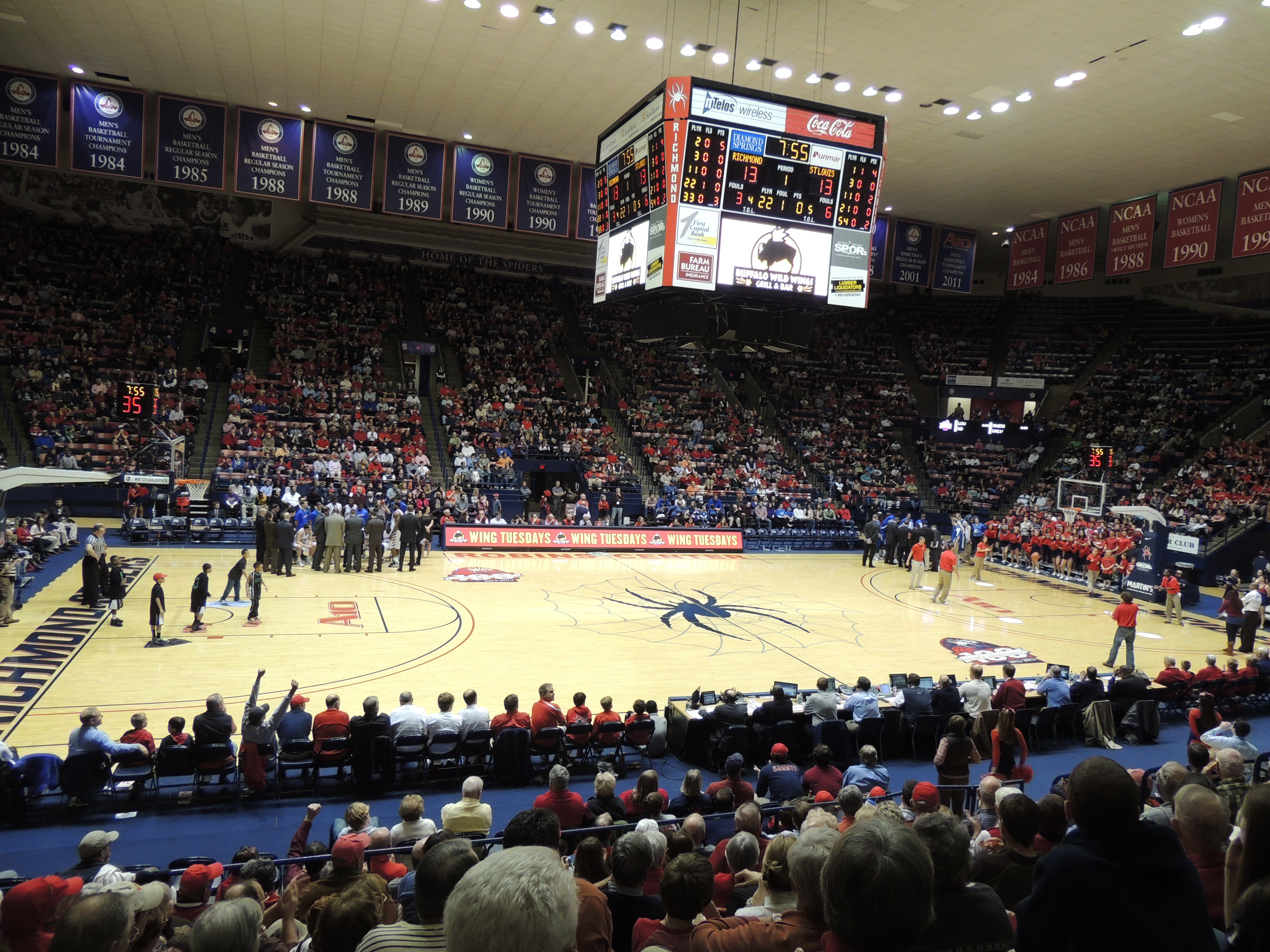
Robins Center, home venue

UR's basketball program has developed a reputation as a "giant killer" in the NCAA tournament, defeating the Charles Barkley-led Auburn Tigers in 1984, reaching the Sweet Sixteen in 1988 by defeating defending national champion Indiana and Georgia Tech, beating #3 seeded South Carolina in 1998, and becoming the first #15 seed to knock off a #2 seed when the Spiders defeated Syracuse in 1991.

=== Women's basketball ===
The University of Richmond women's basketball team is coached by Aaron Roussell, who was hired in 2019 after seven seasons as head coach at Bucknell University. Roussell succeeded Michael Shafer, who had served as the Spiders' head coach for 15 seasons.

The Spiders have made the NCAA tournament three times (1990, 1991, 2005) and the Women's National Invitation Tournament nine times (1989, 2003, 2004, 2009, 2010, 2011, 2012, 2013, 2015).

The women's basketball team plays its home games in the Robins Center.

=== Men's cross country ===
The Spiders men's cross country team is coached by Steve Taylor, who has been the head coach since 2001. Lori Taylor serves as the overall director of all of Richmond's cross country and track and field teams.

In 2010, the men's team won the Atlantic 10 Championship as a team for the first time ever. They went on to place fourth at the NCAA Southeast Regional meet to receive an at-large bid to the NCAA National Championship. Seeded in 28th place, the Richmond Spiders placed 24th at the NCAA National Championship, beating, among others, top-ranked Notre Dame, Texas, Louisville, Penn State, and Georgetown.

Richmond previously sponsored men's indoor and outdoor track and field in addition to cross country, but the track and field programs were discontinued at the end of 2012–13 season as part of a realignment that also saw Richmond discontinue men's soccer and add men's lacrosse as varsity sports. In the late 1970s and early 1980s, Richmond recruited several strong Kenyan runners, including three who qualified for Olympic teams: Sosthenes Bitok and Edwin Koech, who both competed in the 1984 Summer Olympics, and Hillary Tuwei, who qualified for both the 1976 and 1980 Summer Olympics but was unable to compete due to boycotts.

=== Women's cross country and track & field ===
The Richmond Spiders women's cross country and track & field teams have been coached by Lori Taylor since 2001. The Spiders' cross country teams have won the Atlantic 10 conference championship six times under Taylor (2003, 2008, 2010, 2015, 2017, and 2018).

=== Field hockey ===
The University of Richmond's women's field hockey team has been coached by Jamie Montgomery since 2018. The Spiders are celebrating their 100th season of field hockey in 2019 and play their home games at Crenshaw Field, which has been upgraded for the 2019 season with a new support facility including team rooms, restrooms, a press box, filming positions, and a new entrance to the field.

The Spiders have won seven Atlantic 10 regular season championships (2002, 2003, 2004, 2005, 2006, 2009, and 2011) and eight Atlantic 10 tournament championships (2002, 2003, 2004, 2005, 2006, 2009, 2011, and 2014). Each of those conference tournament championships earned the Spiders a bid to the NCAA Division I Field Hockey Championship. In the 2025 season, the Spiders fell to Saint Joseph's in the A10 Championship.

=== Men's golf ===
The University of Richmond's men's golf team has been coached by Adam Decker since 2005. The Spiders' home course is Independence Golf Club in Midlothian, Virginia, and a new training facility for the Spiders was completed at the club in 2018.

The Spiders have seen five golfers win individual conference tournament titles, and have won the Atlantic 10 team title twice. As a team, the Spiders have qualified for NCAA regionals five times (1999, 2000, 2001, 2006, and 2017) and advanced to the NCAA Division I Men's Golf Championships in 1999. In addition, Spider individual golfers have qualified for NCAA regionals three times (Daniel Walker in 2013, Danny Pizetoski in 2014, and Matthew Lowe in 2016), with Walker advancing to nationals in 2013.

=== Women's golf ===
The University of Richmond's women's golf team has been coached by Calle Nielson since 2019 and has competed as a member of the Patriot League since the 2014–15 season. The Spiders' home course is Independence Golf Club in Midlothian, Virginia.

The Spiders have won three Patriot League tournament championships (2016, 2017, and 2018), advancing to NCAA Regionals each of the three years. In addition, Sophie DiPetrillo captured the 2018 individual Patriot League title.

=== Men's lacrosse ===
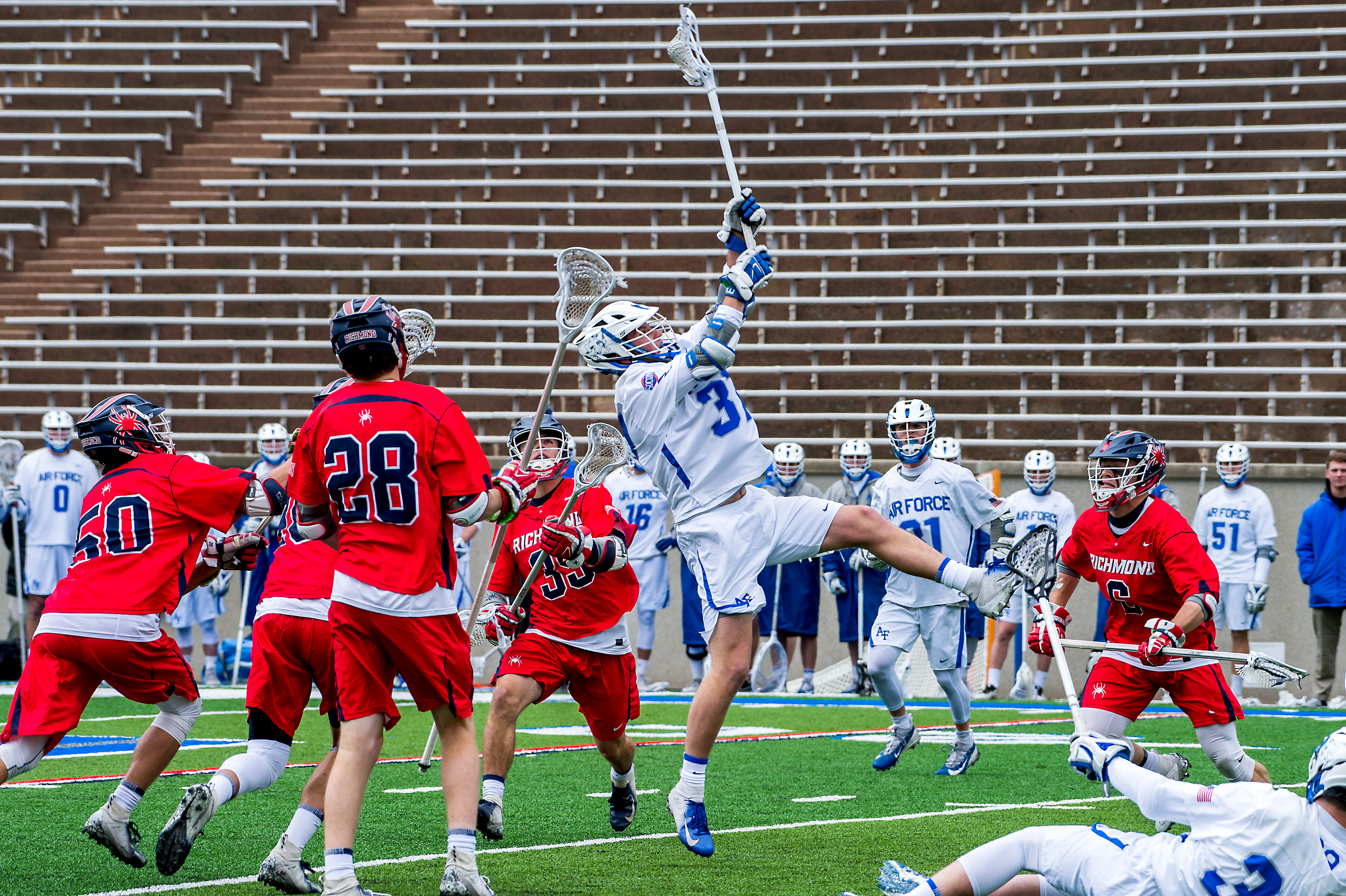
Richmond v Air Force match in 2019

The Richmond men's lacrosse team has been coached by Dan Chemotti since it began play as a varsity program in 2014, with the team playing its home games at E. Claiborne Robins Stadium. The Spiders played their first season as associate members of the Atlantic Sun Conference, now known as the ASUN Conference, before a cooperative agreement between the Atlantic Sun and the Southern Conference (SoCon) saw sponsorship of men's lacrosse shift to the SoCon following the 2014 season. UR remained in SoCon men's lacrosse until the A-10 established a men's lacrosse league, with play starting in the 2023 season.

The Spiders have won at least a share of the Southern Conference title four times and have qualified for the NCAA Division I Men's Lacrosse Championship four times (2014, 2018, 2019 and 2022). In 2025, the Spiders beat North Carolina for their first-ever NCAA tournament win.

=== Women's lacrosse ===
The University of Richmond's women's lacrosse team has been coached by Allison Kwolek since 2012, and the Spiders' home field is E. Claiborne Robins Stadium.

The Spiders have won six Atlantic 10 regular season championships (2006, 2007, 2008, 2010, 2018, and 2019) and five Atlantic 10 conference tournaments (2005, 2006, 2007, 2018, and 2019). Each of those five conference tournaments championships earned the Spiders a berth in the NCAA Division I Women's Lacrosse Championship.

=== Women's soccer ===
The history of the program dates to 1996, and the Spiders have won the Atlantic 10 conference regular season title once (2000) and the conference tournament title once (2002). The Spiders advanced to the NCAA Division I Women's Soccer Championship in 2000 and 2002, including an appearance in the Sweet Sixteen of the 2002 tournament where the Spiders fell to the University of Portland, the eventual national champion.

Marty Beall was named head coach of the Spiders in 2017, and the team's home field is Presidents Field on the University of Richmond campus.

=== Women's swimming and diving ===
The University of Richmond's women's swimming and diving team was established in 1965 and has been led by Matt Barany since 2005, with Nathan Parker serving as head dive coach since 2018. Since joining the Atlantic 10 in 2001, the Spiders have captured 15 of a possible 18 Atlantic 10 championships.

=== Men's tennis ===
The Richmond men's tennis team has been coached by Houston Barrick since 2017, and the team has won four A-10 tournament titles (2002, 2004, 2005, and 2006), advancing to the NCAA Division I Men's Tennis Championship in each of those four seasons.

=== Women's tennis ===
The Richmond women's tennis team has been coached by Mark Wesselink since 1991, and the Spiders have won nine Atlantic 10 championships during his tenure (2002, 2004, 2005, 2006, 2007, 2009, 2010, 2011, and 2012). The Spiders have made 11 appearances in the NCAA Division I Women's Tennis Championship (1997, 1998, 2002, 2004, 2005, 2006, 2007, 2009, 2010, 2011, and 2012).

== Facilities ==
- E. Claiborne Robins Stadium, named in honor of E. Claiborne Robins, Sr. and his historic philanthropy to the school, serves as the home for Richmond's football, soccer, lacrosse, and track and field programs. Robins Stadium, which opened in 2010 with seating for 8,700 people, was built on the site of a smaller, previous stadium known at various times as the Soccer/Track Complex and First Market Stadium.
- The Robins Center arena serves as home to the men's and women's basketball programs. The building originally opened in 1972, and underwent a $17 million renovation in 2013–14 to modernize the facilities. The renovation reduced seating capacity from 9,071 to 7,201, replacing seats in the upper corners with terrace hospitality areas. In addition to the basketball arena, the Robins Center includes a natatorium, home of the women's swimming and diving program, as well as offices and support facilities for most of the Spider athletic programs. The Weinstein Center for Recreation and Wellness, the university's recreational fitness facility, is attached to and integration with the Robins Center.
- Malcolm U. Pitt Field is Richmond's baseball stadium with bleacher seating for 600 spectators. The stadium opened in 1975 and in 2015 was upgraded with an artificial turf field. Indoor training areas for the baseball program are located in Millhiser Gymnasium, adjacent to the Robins Center.
- Crenshaw Field serves as home to the women's field hockey program. The facility includes an AstroTurf field installed in 2011, and lights were added in 2014 to allow for night practices and games.
- The Westhampton Tennis Complex is home to the men's and women's tennis programs. The outdoor facility includes eight courts, an electronic scoreboard, and amphitheater-style seating for spectators. A $1 million renovation of the complex in 2017 will expand the facility to ten courts with an all-new playing surface and spectator facilities.
- As of 2014, Richmond's men's and women's golf teams call Independence Golf Club in Midlothian, Virginia home. The club was fully renovated in 2014 and includes an 18-hole championship course, a nine-hole par-3 short course, two driving ranges, three putting greens, and a short game practice area.

== Discontinued varsity sports ==
=== Men's track and field ===
The men's track and field program was one of the oldest sport teams at the University of Richmond. Initially, in the late nineteenth century, the only sports at Richmond College were baseball, football, and basketball. A field day was also held in the spring when various track and field events were staged. In 1906, an official track and field team was first organized. It was discontinued in April 2013.

=== Men's swimming ===
The men's swimming team was established in the fall of 1948 under Coach William Lumpkin with practices at the Mosque Theater swimming pool. After one season, however, the team was discontinued.

The team was restarted in the fall of 1972 under the direction of Coach Norris Eastman with practices at Crenshaw Pool on the Westhampton side of campus. The team's first meet was against East Carolina University in December 1972. The sport was downgraded from the varsity level to the club level in spring 1999.

=== Men's water polo ===
The men's water polo team was established by Coach Norris Eastman in the fall of 1971 and was downgraded to the club level in spring 1999.

=== Men's soccer ===
The history of the program dates to 1975, and the Spiders won or shared three conference titles and advanced to three NCAA Division I Men's Soccer Championship tournaments (1990, 1998, and 2002). The final permanent head coach of the Spiders was Clint Peay, who led the team from 2009 to 2012, with Leigh Cowlishaw leading the team on an interim basis in its final season. Notable alumni of the Spider program include Toronto FC general manager Tim Bezbatchenko, defender Craig Ziadie, who was selected 28th overall by D.C. United in the 2001 MLS SuperDraft, and former Virginia Tech head coach Oliver Weiss.

The program played its final game on November 2, 2012, a 3–3 draw against crosstown rival VCU.
