= Climacoptera =

Climacoptera may refer to:

- Climacoptera (katydid), a genus of katydids in the family Tettigoniidae
- Climacoptera (plant), a genus of flowering plants in the family Amaranthaceae
