= Szerelemhegyi =

Szerelemhegyi is a Hungarian-language surname. It is a calque of German "Liebenberger" ("lovely/beautiful mountain" + suffix of affiliation "-er") Notable people with this surname include:

- Ervin Szerelemhegyi (1891–1969), Hungarian Olympic track and field athlete
- Tivadar Szerelemhegyi (1857–1942), Hungarian historian and educator
- András Szerelemhegyi (1762–1826), Hungarian composer and opera writer
