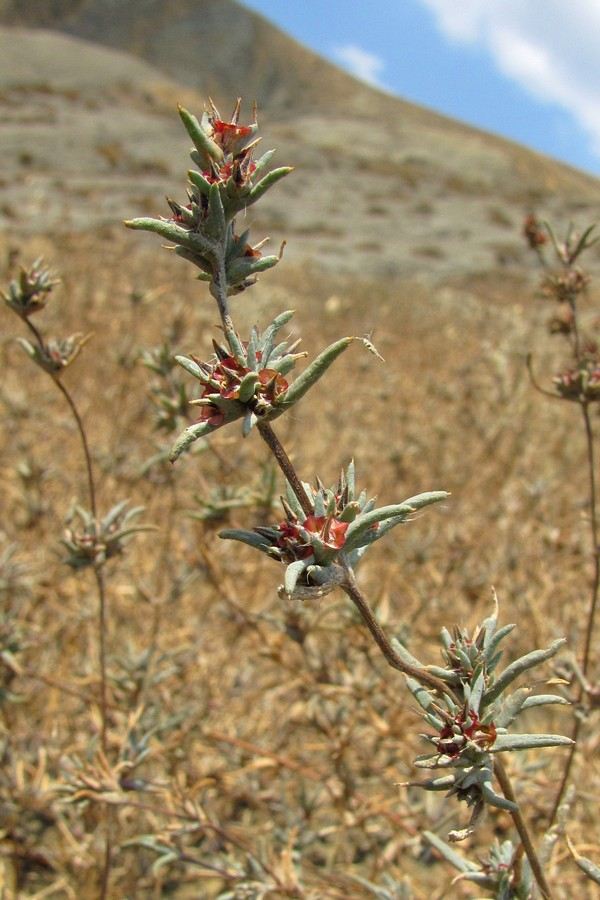
- Climacoptera brachiata

Scientific classification
- Kingdom: Plantae
- Clade: Tracheophytes
- Clade: Angiosperms
- Clade: Eudicots
- Order: Caryophyllales
- Family: Amaranthaceae
- Genus: Pyankovia; Akhani & Roalson

= Pyankovia =

Genus of plants

Pyankovia is a genus of flowering plants belonging to the family Amaranthaceae.

Its native range is Crimea to Mongolia and Afghanistan.

The genus was isolated from the genus Climacoptera as a result of molecular phylogenetic studies, and named in honor of the Russian botanist and phytophysiologist Vladimir Pyankov.

Species:

- Pyankovia affinis (C.A.Mey. ex Schrenk) Mosyakin & Roalson
- Pyankovia brachiata (Pall.) Akhani & Roalson
- Pyankovia roborowskii (Iljin) Mosyakin & Roalson
