= Christophia ammobia =

Scientific classification
- Domain: Eukaryota
- Kingdom: Animalia
- Phylum: Arthropoda
- Class: Insecta
- Order: Lepidoptera
- Family: Pyralidae
- Genus: Christophia
- Species: C. ammobia

Binomial name
- Christophia ammobia Falkovitsh, 1999

Species of moth

Christophia ammobia is a species of snout moth in the genus Christophia. It was described by Mark I. Falkovitsh in 1999 and is known from Uzbekistan.

The larvae have been recorded feeding on Haloxylon species.
