= Christophia ectypella =

Scientific classification
- Domain: Eukaryota
- Kingdom: Animalia
- Phylum: Arthropoda
- Class: Insecta
- Order: Lepidoptera
- Family: Pyralidae
- Genus: Christophia
- Species: C. ectypella

Binomial name
- Christophia ectypella (Ragonot, 1888)

Synonyms
- Centrometopia ectypella Ragonot, 1888

Species of moth

Christophia ectypella is a species of snout moth in the genus Christophia. It was described by Ragonot in 1888. It is found in Russia.
