= Virginia Tech Hokies men's soccer =

American college soccer team

- 2026 Virginia Tech Hokies men's soccer team
- Founded: 1972; 54 years ago
- University: Virginia Tech
- Head coach: Mike Brizendine (18th season)
- Conference: ACC
- Location: Blacksburg, Virginia, US
- Stadium: Thompson Field (capacity: 2,500)
- Nickname: Hokies, Fighting Gobblers
- Colors: Chicago maroon and burnt orange
Home	Away

NCAA tournament College Cup
- 2007

NCAA tournament Quarterfinals
- 2007, 2016

NCAA tournament Round of 16
- 2007, 2016, 2018, 2019, 2020

NCAA tournament appearances
- 2003, 2005, 2006, 2007, 2016, 2017, 2018, 2019, 2020, 2021

Conference regular season championships
- 1997

The Virginia Tech Hokies men's soccer team represents the Virginia Polytechnic Institute and State University in all NCAA Division I men's college soccer competitions. The Hokies are members of the Atlantic Coast Conference and play their home matches at Sandra D. Thompson Field.

Historically, Virginia Tech has been one of the weaker outfits in the ACC, regularly finishing towards the bottom of the conference standings. The program's most successful era was from 2003 to 2007; in that time the Hokies earned three berths into the NCAA Division I Men's Soccer Championship. In 2003 and 2005, the Hokies made their first two appearances in the tournament, where they reached the second round of the tournament. In 2007, the team made a remarkable run to the College Cup, their best result in tournament history. After their 2007 run, they did not qualify for an NCAA Tournament bid again until 2016.

== History ==
=== Oliver Weiss era, NCAA violations ===
They improved greatly with the arrival of head coach Oliver Weiss in 2000. Under Weiss, Tech has made four appearances in the NCAA Tournament (second round in 2003, 2005, first round in 2006, and the semifinals in 2007). In the 2007 season, the team achieved its highest national ranking in school history when they reached #4 on October 23. The previous highest ranking was in the 2005 season at eighth in the country. Also, Tech set a new school record with a 15-game unbeaten streak (10-0-5 from September 2 to November 3) during the 2007 season.

The popularity for the team and game attendance has increased since the invitation to the Atlantic Coast Conference and with the 2006 FIFA World Cup. 2008 was by all accounts a rebuilding year, as the Hokies went winless (0-8) in ACC play.

In 2009, Coach Weiss resigned, days before the school self-reported recruiting violations to the NCAA in connection with Weiss allegedly fronting application fees for recruits. Per NCAA rules, paying for a recruit's application fees, even if the recruit repays the loan, is not permitted. Mike Brizendine, a Weiss assistant and former head coach of Bridgewater College, was promoted to head coach to replace him.

=== Notable events ===
On September 11, 2011, the Hokies defeated the UNC Tar Heels 1–0 in extra time, making it one of the largest college soccer upsets of the 2011 season. Tech, at the time was unranked, while North Carolina was ranked first in the nation.

== Rivalries ==
=== Radford ===
A local derby between the two sides, Virginia Tech regularly plays against the Radford Highlanders men's soccer program.

=== Virginia ===
Virginia Tech's major rival in soccer is the Virginia Cavaliers men's soccer program. The two sides have a longstanding rivalry across all sports which translates over to soccer. Generally, matches between the two sides attract larger than average crowds. In the 2005–06 and 2006-07 school years, the program-wide rivalry was called the Commonwealth Challenge. A renewed rivalry competition began for the 2014–15 season, called the "Commonwealth Clash."

Historically, Virginia has dominated the rivalry, leading the all-time series 34-5-7.

== Roster ==
As of February 20, 2025

Note: Flags indicate national team as defined under FIFA eligibility rules; some limited exceptions apply. Players may hold more than one non-FIFA nationality.

No.	Pos.	Nation	Player
0	GK	USA	Jake Jacobi
1	GK	USA	Mark Hyan
2	DF	ISL	Olafur Floki Stephensen
3	DF	USA	Trey Gardiner
4	DF	USA	Evan Schroeder
6	MF	USA	Tino Vasquez
7	FW	USA	Declan Quill
8	MF	USA	Samy Kolby
9	MF	USA	Alex Perez
10	FW	CRC	Marcos Escoe
11	FW	DEN	Oliver Roche
12	FW	USA	CJ Coppola
13	FW	USA	Nick Laffey
15	FW	USA	Andy Sullins

No.	Pos.	Nation	Player
16	MF	USA	Mathias Yohannes
17	MF	USA	Ethan Hackenberg
18	MF	USA	Willie Cardona
20	FW	FRA	Malick Thiaw
21	DF	RWA	Noe Uwimana
22	MF	FRA	Yonis Kireh
23	DF	CYP	Sergios Feneridis
24	MF	USA	Ian Marcano
25	GK	USA	Cooper Wenzel
26	DF	USA	Harry Neill
27	GK	USA	Timi Adams
29	MF	USA	Carter Hensley
31	MF	USA	Harrison Krieg
32	GK	USA	Zach Glesius

== Seasons ==
Season	Coach	Overall	Conference	Standing	Postseason
Virginia Tech (Independent) (1972–1994)
1972	George Snead	2–4–3			
1973	George Snead	4–3–3			
1974	Jerry Cheynet	5–6–0			
1975	Jerry Cheynet	4–5–1			
1976	Jerry Cheynet	4–6–1			
1977	Jerry Cheynet	7–4–1			
1978	Jerry Cheynet	9–4–2			
1979	Jerry Cheynet	8–6–1			
1980	Jerry Cheynet	8–5–1			
1981	Jerry Cheynet	10–5–1			
1982	Jerry Cheynet	5–10–0			
1983	Jerry Cheynet	1–11–3			
1984	Jerry Cheynet	8–8–2			
1985	Jerry Cheynet	10–7–1			
1986	Jerry Cheynet	7–9–2			
1987	Jerry Cheynet	9–8–3			
1988	Jerry Cheynet	11–9–0			
1989	Jerry Cheynet	10–10–1			
1990	Jerry Cheynet	10–10–1			
1991	Jerry Cheynet	10–8–3			
1992	Jerry Cheynet	10–7–2			
1993	Jerry Cheynet	10–8–1			
1994	Jerry Cheynet	7–12–0			
Independent (1972–1994) Total:		193–165–33			
Virginia Tech (Atlantic 10) (1995–1999)
1995	Jerry Cheynet	8–10–2	6–3–2	T–3rd	A10 Semifinal
1996	Jerry Cheynet	12–8–0	7–4–0	T–4th	A10 Semifinal
1997	Jerry Cheynet	14–5–1	8–2–1	1st	A10 Semifinal
1998	Jerry Cheynet	11–9–1	7–3–1	T–3rd	A10 Final
1999	Jerry Cheynet	11–8–0	7–4–0	T–3rd	
A10 Total:		56–40–4	35–16–4		
Virginia Tech (Independent) (2000–2000)
2000	Jerry Cheynet	8–9–2			
Independent (2000) Total:		8–9–2			
Virginia Tech (Big East) (2001–2003)
2001	Jerry Cheynet	11–6–2	4–4–2	8th	Big East Quarterfinal
2002	Oliver Weiss	10–7–1	5–5–0	9th	
2003	Oliver Weiss	14–5–3	7–3–0	2nd	Big East Quarterfinal; NCAA Second Round
Big East Total:		35–18–6	16–12–2		
Virginia Tech (ACC) (2004–present)
2004	Oliver Weiss	9–10–1	2–5–0	8th	ACC Quarterfinal
2005	Oliver Weiss	10–5–5	3–2–3	4th	ACC Quarterfinal; NCAA Second Round
2006	Oliver Weiss	11–8–1	2–5–1	8th	ACC First Round; NCAA First Round
2007	Oliver Weiss	14–4–5	3–1–4	4th	ACC Semifinal; NCAA College Cup
2008	Oliver Weiss	5–13–1	0–8–0	9th	ACC First Round
2009	Mike Brizendine	5–12–0	2–6–0	8th	ACC First Round
2010	Mike Brizendine	5–13–1	1–6–1	9th	
2011	Mike Brizendine	4–13–2	1–6–1	9th	ACC First Round
2012	Mike Brizendine	7–10–3	0–7–1	9th	ACC Quarterfinal
2013	Mike Brizendine	4–8–5	1–5–5	11th	
2014	Mike Brizendine	7–8–2	2–5–1	9th	ACC First Round
2015	Mike Brizendine	5–9–3	0–5–3	11th	
2016	Mike Brizendine	13–5–4	3–4–2	9th	ACC First Round; NCAA Quarterfinal
2017	Mike Brizendine	10–10–0	3–5–0	9th	NCAA Second Round
2018	Mike Brizendine	11–7–3	3–4–1	7th	NCAA Third Round
2019	Mike Brizendine	10–6–3	2–4–2	11th	NCAA Third Round
2020	Mike Brizendine	7–6–4	5–5–2	2nd (North)	NCAA Third Round
2021	Mike Brizendine	11–5–4	3–4–1	5th (Coastal)	NCAA Second Round
2022	Mike Brizendine	3–14–1	0–8–0	6th (Coastal)	
2023	Mike Brizendine	4–9–4	2–5–1	6th (Coastal)	
2024	Mike Brizendine	7–6–4	1–5–2	14th	
ACC Total:		168–181–56	39–105–31		
Total:		436–348–95			
National champion Postseason invitational champion Conference regular season champion Conference regular season and conference tournament champion Division regular season champion Division regular season and conference tournament champion Conference tournament champion

- A10 Standings source
- ACC Standings source
- Big East Standings source

== Notable alumni ==
As of February 20, 2025

- (United States) Kyle Renfro (2010–2013) – Currently assistant coach with Duke
- (Norway) Sivert Haugli (2018–2021) – Currently with One Knoxville SC
- Daniel Pereira (2019–2020) – Currently with Austin FC and Venezuela international
- (United States) Jacob Labovitz (2019–2021) – Currently with Vermont Green FC
- (United States) Danny Flores (2021–2022) – Currently with Sporting Kansas City
