= Grabo (surname) =

Grabo is a surname. Notable people with the surname include:

- Anto Grabo (born 1960), Yugoslavian-born Hong Kong footballer of Croatian descent
- Edith Grabo (fl. 1960s), East German slalom canoer
- Paul Grabö (1918–2002), Swedish politician
