= Christophia climacopterae =

Scientific classification
- Domain: Eukaryota
- Kingdom: Animalia
- Phylum: Arthropoda
- Class: Insecta
- Order: Lepidoptera
- Family: Pyralidae
- Genus: Christophia
- Species: C. climacopterae

Binomial name
- Christophia climacopterae Falkovitsh, 1999

Species of moth

Christophia climacopterae is a species of snout moth in the genus Christophia. It was described by Mark I. Falkovitsh in 1999 and is known from Kazakhstan.

The larvae have been recorded feeding on Climacoptera crassa.
