= Christophia saxauli =

Scientific classification
- Domain: Eukaryota
- Kingdom: Animalia
- Phylum: Arthropoda
- Class: Insecta
- Order: Lepidoptera
- Family: Pyralidae
- Genus: Christophia
- Species: C. saxauli

Binomial name
- Christophia saxauli Falkovitsh, 1999

Species of moth

Christophia saxauli is a species of snout moth in the genus Christophia. It was described by Mark I. Falkovitsh in 1999 and is known from Uzbekistan and Mongolia.

The larvae have been recorded feeding on Haloxylon ammodendron.
