= Christophia eriopodae =

Scientific classification
- Domain: Eukaryota
- Kingdom: Animalia
- Phylum: Arthropoda
- Class: Insecta
- Order: Lepidoptera
- Family: Pyralidae
- Genus: Christophia
- Species: C. eriopodae

Binomial name
- Christophia eriopodae Falkovitsh, 1999

Species of moth

Christophia eriopodae is a species of snout moth in the genus Christophia. It was described by Mark I. Falkovitsh in 1999 and is known from Uzbekistan.

The larvae have been recorded feeding on Anabasis eriopoda.
