= Noe Uwimana =

Rwandan footballer (born 2005)

Personal information
- Date of birth: 19 February 2005 (age 21)
- Place of birth: Austin, Texas, United States
- Height: 1.72 m (5 ft 8 in)
- Position: Right-back

Team information
- Current team: Virginia Tech Hokies
- Number: 21

Youth career
- 2019–2021: Richmond Academy
- 2021–2023: Philadelphia Union

College career
Years	Team	Apps	(Gls)
2023–	Virginia Tech Hokies	30	(3)

Senior career*
Years	Team	Apps	(Gls)
2022–2023	Philadelphia Union II	6	(0)

International career^{‡}
2025–	Rwanda	1	(0)
- * Club domestic league appearances and goals as of 13:53, 6 June 2025 (UTC) ‡ National team caps and goals as of 13:53, 6 June 2025 (UTC)

Noe Uwimana (born 19 February 2005) is a professional footballer who plays as a right-back for the Virginia Tech Hokies. Born in the United States, he plays for the Rwanda national team.

== Club career ==
Uwimana joined the Richmond Academy in 2019, before joining the academy of Philadelphia Union 24 February 2021. From 2022 to 2023, he made 6 appearances with Philadelphia Union II in the MLS Next Pro. On 1 July 2023, he joined the Virginia Tech Hokies in the NCAA Division I. On 8 November 2023, he was named to the ACC All-Freshman team for 2023.

== International career ==
Uwimana was born in the United States to a Rwandan father and Tunisian mother. He was called up to the Rwanda national team in June 2023 for a set of 2023 Africa Cup of Nations qualification matches. He debuted with the Rwanda national team in a friendly 2–0 loss to Algeria on 5 June 2025.
