= Samuel Lucien Terrien =

French-American Protestant theologian and biblical scholar

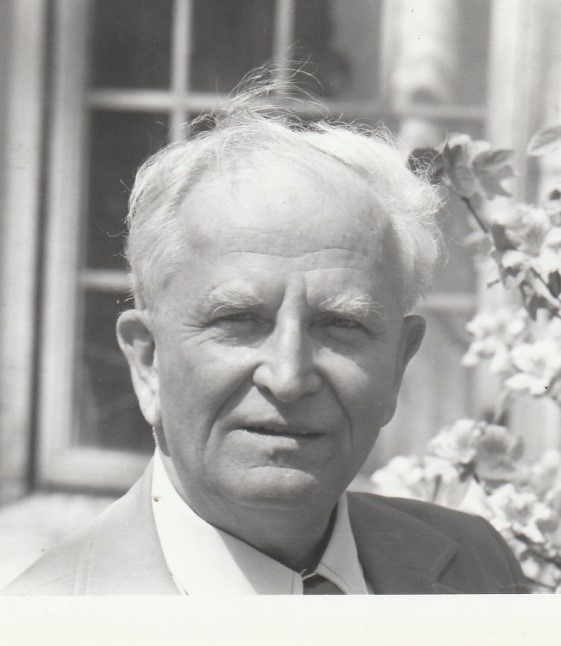
- Born: March 27, 1911; Saumur, France
- Died: February 6, 2002 (aged 90); West Newton, Massachusetts
- Education: University of Paris
- Occupation: Theologian
- Years active: 20th Century
- Spouse: Sara Frantz Terrien (married 1938–2002)

Samuel Lucien Terrien (March 27, 1911 – February 6, 2002) was a French-American Protestant theologian and biblical scholar. A professor at Union Theological Seminary for thirty-six years, he is known for his biblical commentary, particularly for his scholarly contributions to the study of Job and the Psalms in the Old Testament and for his book, The Elusive Presence (1978), in which he presented a new theology of the presence and absence of God written largely in the context of cult, not covenant. It incorporated both Old and New Testaments in a broader ecumenical context and introduced a way for future theologians to ask how the presence of God is experienced by engaging the wisdom traditions to explore how ‘empirical observation can testify to a divine presence in human life just as visionary experiences can.'

Terrien's articles and books on the Book of Job have been influential among theological scholars. His study of the Psalms, culminating in The Psalms: Strophic Structure and Theological Commentary (2003), is an extensive exegesis of the Psalter that offers a meticulous translation of the texts as well as their theological significance.

== Biography ==
Terrien was born in 1911 to a French Protestant family in Saumur, France. His mother was Swiss, born in Neuchâtel, his father French and whose own father had helped to construct the Protestant Temple in Saumur, a town on the Loire River with an extensive Huguenot history. Terrien attended the College de Saumur and began his studies in theology, philology and archeology at the University of Paris between 1928 and 1933. He also studied the Ancient Hebrew, Ancient Egyptian (Coptic), Greek, Latin, Assyro-Babylonian, Syriac, Akkadian, Ugaritic and Aramaic languages. In 1933-1934 he spent a year at the École Biblique in Jerusalem. During that year, he lived with the Ru'alla Bedouin in what was then Transjordania. He travelled through Syria, Palestine and Egypt with a group of Dominican friars.

Upon his return to France, Terrien was offered a fellowship to Union Theological Seminary in New York City. In 1936, he earned the Master in Sacred Theology degree at Union Theological Seminary (UTS), his thesis on "La Valeur des Tablettes de Ras Shamra pour l'etude de l'Ancien Testament." His dissertation for the Doctorate in Theology in 1941, "The Sceptics in the Old Testament and in the Literature of the Ancient Near East" concerned Old Testament heterodoxy.

Terrien taught ancient Hebrew, cognate languages, and theology at UTS from 1940-1976, becoming Auburn professor in 1953, then Davenport Professor of Hebrew and Cognate Languages. His area of specialized scholarship was that of Ancient Near East Wisdom Literature, particularly the Psalms and the Book of Job, as well as a study of theological unity in the Bible.

Elected as Secretary of the Faculty at UTS, Terrien shared in the lively intellectual atmosphere of the post-war period that put that institution at the forefront of liberal and neo-orthodox Protestantism. His fellow faculty members included the prominent theologians Reinhold Niebuhr and Paul Tillich as well as Raymond E. Brown, Harry Emerson Fosdick, George Buttrick, Henry Sloane Coffin, James Muilenberg, Wilhelm Pauck, Cyril Richardson, Paul Scherer and Robert McAfee Brown. He participated in the open ecumenical atmosphere among many of the institutions in Morningside Heights which included frequent and lively interchanges with Rabbi Abraham Joshua Heschel.

Terrien was Associate Editor for Old Testament Introduction and Exegesis for The Interpreter's Bible, a new biblical commentary reflecting the state of the biblical and theological scholarship of the time that sold nearly three million copies by 1985. As well as his unique scholarship on the Psalms and the book of Job, Terrien's work in comparative studies included Wisdom in the book of Amos which received international attention. In 1971 he collaborated with Father Denis Barthélemy, a French Catholic scholar, on the first ecumenical translation of the Book of Job, in French.

Interested in the arts and their theological interpretations, from plays to modern paintings, poetry and music, he published many articles, commentaries and critical reviews of a wide variety of books and scholarly articles as well as contemporary popular plays such as JB (Archibald MacLeish), Tiny Alice (Edward Albee) and Equus (Peter Shaffer). Throughout his career at Union Theological Seminary and beyond, Terrien lectured at many institutions around the world and served as interim pastor at several churches including the American Church in Paris (1964) and the French Evangelical Church in NYC (1975). Upon his retirement in 1975 he and his wife Sara moved to Washington, Connecticut, and later to West Newton, Massachusetts, where he died in 2002 just after completion of a 1000-page manuscript, posthumously published as Commentary on the Psalms.

== Theology ==
=== Theocentricity of all life in wisdom literature/theology of presence and absence ===
Through the study of wisdom literature, Terrien understood a biblical theology that was about God's presence rather than covenant, a presence as the center of Biblical faith, yet one that remains elusive. He "entered into the world of the Bible through probing ancient secularism; he now found in its theocentrism, and its persistent quest for the presence of God in his absence, a voice for the new age." Although his focus is primarily on the Old Testament, Terrien carries his treatment of the central theme of the presence of God into the New Testament in an important effort to shed new light on the relationship between the two testaments. This theology of presence is a unifying theme between them, yet his approach was also a dialectic one.

As Walter Brueggemann explains, "Terrien's main effort is to show that the sapiential and hymnic materials must be centrally included in an Old Testament theology. Negatively he argues that the historical-covenantal materials have been unduly and disproportionately stressed. Thus, he seeks to establish a balance in which the covenantal/historical materials are seen as one side of a dialectic, but not the whole matter." For Terrien, cultus and presence have dominance over covenant. He argues that the hiddenness of God becomes a means to access the divine presence, while preserving God's freedom, understanding God's presence today to be continual, but elusive and intangible, never breaking into human history in any discretely identifiable event.

=== A biblical theology of manhood and womanhood ===
Terrien began early to explore a biblical theology, in both Old and New Testaments, that was unique in the ancient world and gave women as well as men an equal and full standing as humans. In an introduction to his book, Till the Heart Sings, Phyllis Trible called the theology ‘the first, and to date, the only full-blown biblical theology of womanhood and manhood." According to Terrien, Biblical theology regards woman as ‘the crown of creation' if one examines the overall perspective of the Bible and its gradual composition and canonization. The book's thesis upholds a vision of sexual relations in the Bible that promotes mutuality and equality between women and men. Terrien stated that the Bible, both Old Testament and New, advances a theology of manhood and womanhood unique in the ancient world. This theology turns away from sexism and misogyny to confer upon woman as well as man the full stature of humanity.

== Honors ==
Best Book Relating to the Old Testament, Biblical Archeology Society (BAS) 1997 (The Iconography of Job).

A festschrift was published in his honor, Israelite Wisdom: Theological and Literary Essays in Honor of Samuel Terrien, Eds. John G. Gammie, Walter Brueggemann, W. Lee Humphreys, James M. Ward. (Missoula, Montana: Scholars Press, Union Theological Seminary, 1978) ISBN 0-89130-208-5

== Selected works ==
- Terrien, Samuel (1978). The Elusive Presence: Toward a New Biblical Theology. San Francisco: Harper & Row. ISBN 0-06-068232-9.
- —— (1985). Till the Heart Sings: A Biblical Theology of Manhood and Womanhood. Philadelphia: Fortress Press. ISBN 0-8006-0752-X.
- —— (2003). The Psalms: Strophic Structure and Theological Commentary. Grand Rapids, Michigan: Wm. B. Eerdmans Publishing Co. ISBN 0-8028-2605-9.
