= Chris Vierira =

American baseball player

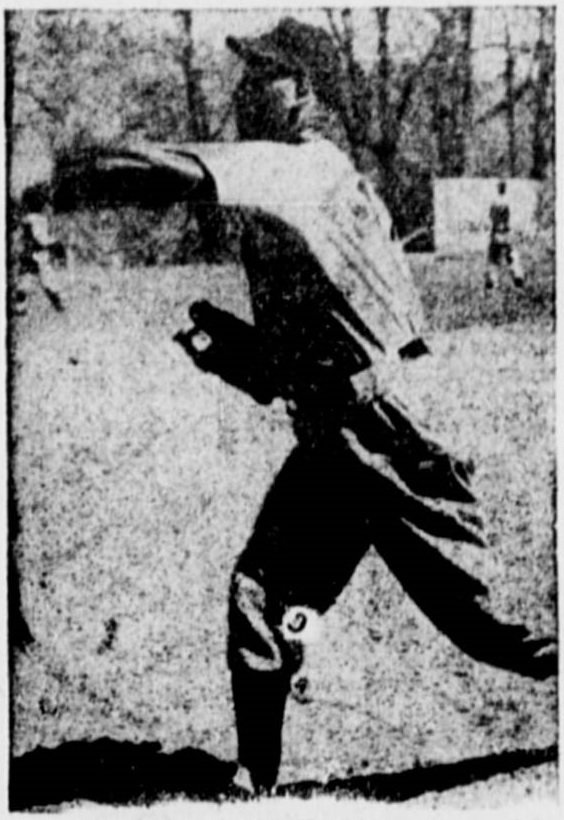
- Vierira in 1949
- Outfielder
- Born: April 16, 1925; Rye, New York, U.S.
- Died: February 9, 2002 (aged 76); New Britain, Connecticut, U.S.
- Batted: Left Threw: Left

Negro league baseball debut
- 1948, for the New York Black Yankees

Last appearance
- 1948, for the New York Black Yankees

Career statistics
- Games played: 3
- Plate appearances: 7
- Hits: 0

Teams
- New York Black Yankees (1948)

Justin Alves Vierira (April 16, 1925 – February 9, 2002), nicknamed "Chris" and also known as "Justin Joseph Lópes", was an American Negro league outfielder in the 1940s.

A native of Rye, New York, Vieriria played for the New York Black Yankees in 1948. He died in New Britain, Connecticut in 2002 at age 76 after working for several years for the Fafnir Bearing Company.
