= Christophia callipterella =

Scientific classification
- Domain: Eukaryota
- Kingdom: Animalia
- Phylum: Arthropoda
- Class: Insecta
- Order: Lepidoptera
- Family: Pyralidae
- Genus: Christophia
- Species: C. callipterella

Binomial name
- Christophia callipterella Ragonot, 1887

Species of moth

Christophia callipterella is a species of snout moth in the genus Christophia. It was described by Ragonot in 1887. It is found in Turkmenistan.
