= Christophia trilineella =

Scientific classification
- Domain: Eukaryota
- Kingdom: Animalia
- Phylum: Arthropoda
- Class: Insecta
- Order: Lepidoptera
- Family: Pyralidae
- Genus: Christophia
- Species: C. trilineella

Binomial name
- Christophia trilineella Ragonot, 1887

Species of moth

Christophia trilineella is a species of snout moth in the genus Christophia. It was described by Émile Louis Ragonot in 1887, and is known from Uzbekistan.

The wingspan is about 17 mm.
