= Christophia =

Scientific classification
- Domain: Eukaryota
- Kingdom: Animalia
- Phylum: Arthropoda
- Class: Insecta
- Order: Lepidoptera
- Family: Pyralidae
- Tribe: Phycitini
- Genus: Christophia; Ragonot, 1887

Genus of moths

Christophia is a genus of snout moths. It was erected by Émile Louis Ragonot in 1887 and is known from Uzbekistan, and Kazakhstan.

== Species ==
- Christophia ammobia Falkovitsh, 1999
- Christophia callipterella Ragonot, 1887
- Christophia climacopterae Falkovitsh, 1999
- Christophia dattinella Ragonot, 1887
- Christophia ectypella Ragonot, 1888
- Christophia eriopodae Falkovitsh, 1999
- Christophia leucosiphon Falkovitsh, 1999
- Christophia litterella Ragonot, 1887
- Christophia saxauli Falkovitsh, 1999
- Christophia tessulata Falkovitsh, 1999
- Christophia triceratops Falkovitsh, 1999
- Christophia trilineella Ragonot, 1887
