= Christophia leucosiphon =

Scientific classification
- Domain: Eukaryota
- Kingdom: Animalia
- Phylum: Arthropoda
- Class: Insecta
- Order: Lepidoptera
- Family: Pyralidae
- Genus: Christophia
- Species: C. leucosiphon

Binomial name
- Christophia leucosiphon Falkovitsh, 1999

Species of moth

Christophia leucosiphon is a species of snout moth in the genus Christophia. It was described by Mark I. Falkovitsh in 1999 and is known from Uzbekistan, Kazakhstan and Mongolia.

The larvae have been recorded feeding on Haloxylon ammodendron.
