= Christophia tessulata =

Scientific classification
- Domain: Eukaryota
- Kingdom: Animalia
- Phylum: Arthropoda
- Class: Insecta
- Order: Lepidoptera
- Family: Pyralidae
- Genus: Christophia
- Species: C. tessulata

Binomial name
- Christophia tessulata Falkovitsh, 1999

Species of moth

Christophia tessulata is a species of snout moth in the genus Christophia. It was described by Mark I. Falkovitsh in 1999 and is known from Uzbekistan.

The larvae have been recorded feeding on Caroxylon orientalis.
