= Ismail Sirri Pasha =

Egyptian engineer and politician

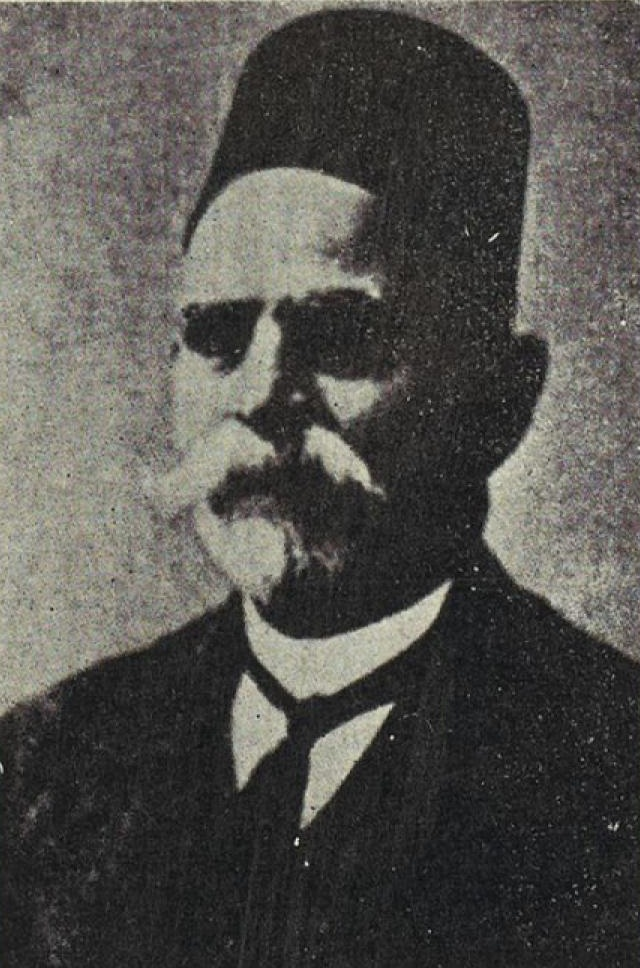

Isma'il Sirri Pasha (1861–1937) (Arabic: إسماعيل سري باشا) was an Egyptian engineer and politician. He was Minister of both Public Works and Defence in nine governments between 1908 and 1926.

== Career ==
Ismail Sirri was born in the province of Al-Minya. He graduated with a diploma in engineering from Paris in 1878, and trained in London. He translated books from English and French. He died in Cairo. His son Hussein Serry Pasha was also a notable politician.

== Published works ==
- Riyad al-Anfus fi Tizkar al-Muhandis (Arabic: رياض الأنفس في تذكار المهندس).
- Al-'Ilm al-Nafees bi al-Fayyum wa Buhayrat Muris (1889). Translation of Robert Hanbury Brown, The Fayûm and Lake Mœris (London, E. Stanford, 1892). Translated from English to Arabic by Isma'il Sirri.
- Al-Durar al-Bahiyya (1883). Translated from French to Arabic by Isma'il Sirri.
