= Leonid Hakobyan =

Soviet and Armenian politician and economist

Member of Parliamentary Assembly of the Council of Europe
- In office 2000

Minister of territorial administration and infrastructure օf Armenia
- In office 2000

Chairman of the Committee on Economy and Finance of the Inter-Parliamentary Assembly of the Commonwealth of Independent States
- In office 1992-1996

deputy of the Supreme Council of the Armenian SSR
- In office 1981 to 1990

Deputy and First Deputy Minister of Trade of Armenian SSR
- In office 1976 to 1979

Personal details
- Born: June 5, 1936 Leninakan, Armenian SSR, Soviet Union
- Died: February 6, 2002 (aged 65) Yerevan, Armenia
- Party: Communist Party of the Soviet Union
- Education: Moscow Institute of Finance
- Occupation: economist

Leonid S. Hakobyan (in Armenian: Լեոնիդ Հակոբյան; June 5, 1936, Leninakan, Soviet Union – February 6, 2002, Yerevan, Armenia) was a Soviet and Armenian economist and politician. He held a PhD in Economics (1984) and served as Corresponding Member of the Armenian National Academy of Sciences (2000).

== Biography ==
In 1957, he graduated from the Moscow Institute of Finance; later on, he completed courses in Moscow Correspondence Institute of Law (1958) and Mechanical Engineering Institute (1964). In 1958, he became a CPSU member. From 1976 to 1979 he was Deputy and First Deputy Minister of Trade of Armenian SSR. In 1981, he graduated from the Academy of Economics under the USSR Council of Ministers. From 1981 to 1990 he served as a deputy of the Supreme Council of the Armenian SSR, being a Deputy Chairman of the Committee on Finance, Budget, Loans and Economics; later on a deputy of the Supreme Council of independent Armenia, a member of the Standing Committee on Financial-Credit, Budgetary and Economic Affairs. Through 1992-1996 he had been Chairman of the Committee on Economy and Finance of the Inter-Parliamentary Assembly of the Commonwealth of Independent States. In 1999, he became Second Secretary of the Armenian Communist Party. He dealt with the issues of the mechanization of labor and the functional structure of the workforce in industry and its improvement, and the implementation of high technologies.

In 2000, he served as Minister of territorial administration and infrastructure օf Armenia.

In 2000, he became Corresponding Member of the Armenian National Academy of Sciences.

Also in 2000, he became Member of Parliamentary Assembly of the Council of Europe.
