= Vladimir Pyankov =

Vladimir Ivanovich Pyankov
- Born: 31 March 1954; Pervouralsk
- Died: 1 February 2002 (aged 47); Germany
- Citizenship: Russia
- Education: Ural State University
- Scientific career
- Fields: phytophysiologist
- Workplaces: Ural State University

Vladimir Ivanovich Pyankov (31 March 1954 – 1 February 2002) was a Russian phytophysiologist, professor of the Ural State University.

Great contribution in studies of structural and functional methods of the ecological studies of photosynthesis has been made by V. I. Pyankov. He successfully developed the idea of academician Adolf Mokronosov about the unity of structure and function in the evolution of photosynthesis.

== Named for ==
- Pyankovia Akhani & E.H.Roalson

== Works ==
- V.I.Pyankov, H.Ziegler, A.Kuz’min, G.E.Edwards. - Origin and evolution of C4 photosynthesis in the tribe Salsoleae (Chenopodiaceae) based on anatomical and biochemical types in leaves and cotyledons. Plant Syst Evol 230: S.43–74, 2001.
