= Lotte Specht =

German footballer (1911–2002)

Personal information
- Full name: Charlotte Specht
- Date of birth: 15 October 1911
- Place of birth: Frankfurt, Germany
- Date of death: 10 February 2002 (aged 90)

Lotte Specht (15 October 1911 – 10 February 2002) was a German football player. In 1930, she founded 1. Deutscher Damenfußballclub (1. DDFC) the first women's football team in Germany.

== Literature ==
- Lotte Specht. In: Ronny Galczynski: Frauenfußball von A–Z. Humboldt, Hannover 2010, ISBN 978-3-86910-169-9, Page 269.
