= Sarah Clarke (nun) =

Irish nun and civil rights campaigner

Sister Sarah Clarke

Personal life
- Born: 17 November 1919 Eyrecourt, County Galway, Ireland
- Died: 4 February 2002 (aged 82) London, United Kingdom
- Education: Carysfort College, Dublin
- Known for: Civil Rights Campaigner
- Occupation: Nun, Teacher

Religious life
- Religion: Roman Catholic

Sister Sarah Clarke (17 November 1919 – 4 February 2002) was an Irish nun and civil rights campaigner known for her work on prisoner's rights. She began campaigning in 1970, when she joined efforts to free Irish republican prisoners. Over the next three decades she became well known for her activism, particularly after her involvement in high-profile cases like 1973 Old Bailey bombing, the Birmingham Six or the Guildford Four and Maguire Seven.

For her activism she was called "the Joan of Arc of British prisons" by Paddy Hill and awarded the Pro Ecclesia et Pontifice cross by pope John Paul II.

== Early life ==
Sarah Clarke was born in Eyrecourt, County Galway on 17 November 1919. Her father, Michael Clarke, married her mother Brigid Clarke (née Claffey) following the death of his first wife. Her half-sister Kathleen Hennelly (née Clarke) was sent to live with her aunt and uncle in Redmount whilst Sarah was raised with her brother Michael. Clarke's father fell from a horse which led to him using a wheelchair, and later dying of tuberculosis when Clarke was 8. Clarke's mother took over the running of the farm, as well as the Clarke family shop and pub. She remarried, marrying Tim Cosgrave, a horse breeder and brother of the Galway TD, James Cosgrave. Clarke attended the St Raphael convent, Loughrea, County Galway. Possibly influenced by the 1932 Eucharistic Congress held in Ireland, Clarke claimed that half of her class ended up entering convents. In September 1939, she entered the Sainte Union convent at Killashee, County Kildare, taking the name of Sr Mary Auxilius. Thirty years later she reverted to her baptismal name when she found people struggled to pronounce it. She attended Carysfort teacher training college, Dublin in 1941, receiving a bilingual certificate in Irish and English.

== Career ==
Clarke's first job was at Our Lady's Bower school in Athlone, teaching there for 16 years. She taught art and used advanced teaching methods, but found the running of the school very strict. She transferred to England in 1957, at her request, teaching at Sainte Union convents at Southampton, at Herne Bay, Kent, and Highgate, London. After the liberalisation of the Catholic church after Vatican II, Clarke was allowed to attend Chelsea Art School, later attending Reading University to study typography and ergonomics.

It was in 1970 that Clarke began the work that she would do for the rest of her life, as part of the Northern Ireland civil rights movement (NICRA), specifically campaigning for the rights of republican prisoners. She was allowed to join NICRA, acting as the London secretary briefly before becoming disillusioned with the movement. She worked alone for many years, partnering with activists like Fr Denis Faul. She visited the Price sisters, Marian and Dolours, and others who were accused of the Old Bailey bombings in 1973, after which she was banned from meeting category A prisoners. She was permitted to bring parcels and letters to them, act as a contact point for their families, and lobbied politicians regarding their condition while incarcerated. Clarke's order released her from teaching duties in 1976, and allowed her to buy a car. She went on to help establish the Relatives and Friends of Prisoners Committee, with the aim of repatriating republican prisoners in Ireland.

Clarke rose in prominence due to her work leading the campaigns to clear the names of the Birmingham Six, the Guildford Four and Maguire Seven in the late 1970s. She was granted permission to visit Giuseppe Conlon in 1978, and was one of the last people to see him alive. On 1 July 1985, a BBC Two television programme about Clarke was broadcast. She also helped Chris Mullin and Ronan Bennett with their books on the cases. In October 1989, when the convictions of the Guildford Four were quashed, Paul Hill would only pose for The Observer newspaper's photographer if Clarke posed with him. That picture was featured on the newspaper's front page. Paddy Hill called her "the Joan of Arc of British prisons".

These public vindications of innocence in high-profile cases validated Clarke's work, but she always maintained that she helped the innocent and the guilty, which she took from Christ's message "I was sick and in prison and you visited me". Her work was also influenced by her nationalism, with her republican sympathies being shown in her autobiography, No faith in the system (1995). From 1995, she was permitted to visit three category A prisoners, and although she was getting progressively blind, she continued to work.

== Death ==
She died on 4 February 2002 in London. Her requiem mass on 11 February was attended by Daithi Ó Ceallaigh, Irish ambassador to Britain, three MPs, and mayor of London, Ken Livingstone. Her remains were returned to Ireland, with Taoiseach Bertie Ahern, Albert Reynolds, and Paul Hill being part of the crowd which met her coffin at the airport mortuary. She is buried near the River Shannon in County Galway, beside her brother Michael.

An Early Day Motion in the UK House of Commons commemorated her life.

She was awarded the Pro Ecclesia et Pontifice cross by the pope in December 2001.

The Falls Community Council Dúchas oral history archive holds an interview with Clarke from 2001.

== Publications ==
- No Faith in the System: A Search for Justice. Cork, Ireland: Mercier Press. 1995. ISBN 978-1-85635-160-7.
