= Marcel Couttet =

French ice hockey player

- Born: 27 April 1912; Chamonix, France
- Died: 23 February 2002 (aged 89)
- National team: France

Marcel André Couttet (27 April 1912 – 23 February 2002) was a French ice hockey player. He competed in the men's tournament at the 1936 Winter Olympics.
