= Cyril Richardson (theologian) =

English-born American Christian theologian, humorist and professor

Cyril C. Richardson (1909–1976) was an English-born American Christian theologian, humorist and professor at the Union Theological Seminary in the City of New York. He attended the University of Saskatchewan, Emmanuel College in Saskatoon and the Union Theological Seminary. He joined the Union Theological Seminary faculty in 1934 and stayed there for 40 years. Richardson was selected to be president of the American Society of Church History in 1948, but resigned from the position due to a tubercular condition. He died in 1976.
