= Orlando Sierra Hernández =

Colombian newspaper columnist

- Born: September 21, 1959; Santa Rosa de Cabal, Risaralda, Colombia
- Died: February 1, 2002 (Aged 42); Manizales, Caldas, Colombia
- Cause of death: Gunshot to the head
- Education: Universidad de Caldas, Humanities; Universidad Jorge Tadeo Lozano, Journalism
- Occupations: Deputy Director and columnist
- Years active: 1985-2002
- Employer: La Patria
- Known for: staunch opposition to the corruption of Colombian politicians

Orlando Sierra Hernández (September 21, 1959 - February 1, 2002) was a Colombian columnist and journalist, deputy director for La Patria, main newspaper in Manizales, the capital city of the Department of Caldas, in Colombia. He wrote a column and regularly criticized the corruption of the local government in colombian department of Caldas. He was also a novelist and poet.

== Personal ==
Orlando Sierra Hernández was born in Santa Rosa de Cabal, Risaralda, Colombia in 1959. As a child, Hernández struggled in both primary school and high school, but he always wanted to continue to study literature. He continued his studies at the Universidad de Caldas, where he studied the humanities, and the Universidad Jorge Tadeo Lozano, where he studied journalism. This education would give him the necessary skills to carry out his life as a journalist. He would become a professor and cultural center director at the Universidad de Caldas, but he always hoped to become a writer.

== Career ==
Orlando Sierra Hernández became associated with La Patria newspaper around 1985 when he began writing a cultural column for the newspaper. He would later become the editor-in-chief of the newspaper and began writing his most well-known column, Punto de Encuentro (Translated: Meeting Point). This column began in 1990 and was a required reading in Colombia. In addition to this column, which openly criticized the corruption of Colombian politicians, Hernández wrote a novel called La estación de los sueños (The Season of Dreams) and three poetry books. At the time of his murder, Hernández was the deputy director of the newspaper and was always outspoken about the corruption he felt was unwarranted within the Colombia political system. He often called out Francisco Ferney Tapasco González on his corruption regarding his use of political office for personal gain at the expense of the people he was governing.

== Death ==
Manizales is in Colombia and is shown relative to the capital city of Bogotá.

Orlando Sierra Hernández's murder was something he himself thought would happen at some point. The murder occurred during the afternoon of January 30, 2002, when he and his daughter were walking back to La Patria headquarters from their lunch together. He was shot at point black in the head two times with a revolver by Luis Frenando Soto Zapata who was detained shortly after the shooting along with Luis Arley Ortiz. Sierra was rushed to a hospital where he died on February 1, 2002. Luis Frenando Soto Zapata claimed that he thought Orlando Sierra Hernández was the man who had killed a relation of his several years ago, but upon closer examination, surveillance cameras of the shooting place revealed that Soto had been waiting for several hours near the place where Sierra was ultimately killed. Luis Arley Ortiz was released by authorities at first, but was arrested once again in May 2002 when authorities discovered he was the middleman who facilitated the deal between a gang of assassins and the person who ordered Sierra's death.

A few years after the investigation of Sierra's murder, which was headed by the National Human Rights Unit of the Prosecutor's Office, Luis Frenando Soto Zapata was convicted and received a 19-year prison sentence. He served five years of this sentence, and upon his release, he was murdered shortly after by the police, after assaulting and killing a man in the city of Cali. Luis Arley Ortiz and Luis Tabares Hernández, who were co-perpetrators of the crime, were also convicted and received 28-year prison sentences, and the case was essentially closed by The National Human Rights Unit of the Prosecutor's Office in June 2004. However, seven Colombian magazines and newspapers believed the crime was not fully solved, and they came together to create Project Manizales in an effort to raise awareness for Sierra Hernández and investigate his case further. Around this time, a documentary was made regarding Sierra's murder called, "The Battle of Silence."

Finally, nine years after the Sierra killing, Colombian officials charged Francisco Ferney Tapasco González with being the one who order Sierra to be killed. He was sentenced to 36 years in prison in November 2015 when he was finally captured and thrown into jail. Around the same time, the court order 28 year sentences for both Fabio López Escobar and Jorge Hernando López Escobar, and as of early 2016, Fabio López Escobar had been deported from the United States to serve his sentence in Colombia and both are now behind bars. Francisco Ferney Tapasco González's lawyers have said they will appeal the court's decision. This was the first ever case of a murdered journalist in Colombia in which all those involved with the murder were prosecuted and sentenced to prison.

== Context ==
Orlando Sierra Hernández had been openly critical of Francisco Ferney Tapasco González for some time. In fact, he wrote a column in March 1996 laying out why Francisco Ferney Tapasco González was completely unfit to be the president of the assembly of Caldas. This column put a target on his back, and he even had to have bodyguards to protect him in 1998 when his life had been threatened due to his remarks which condemned the rampant corruption occurring within the Colombian government. Orlando Sierra Hernández had even begun to investigate Francisco Ferney Tapasco González's involvement with a group of assassins. Orlando Sierra Hernández had not brought these allegations forward, but he was in the process, and Tapasco did not want this information to get out to the public.

== Impact ==
Orlando Sierra Hernández was important because he acted as the political watchdog over the Caldas Department government. He was always open and honest in his columns, and he was never afraid to call anyone out no matter how important that person was. His death was also important because justice was served for his murder, and it was a huge victory for Colombian journalists because although any journalists had been killed previously, Sierra was the first to have total justice through the judiciary system in Colombia.

== Reactions ==
After Sierra's Death, many press freedom organizations made statements condemning the act. Koichiro Matsuura, director-general of UNESCO, said, "The murder of Orlando Sierra Hernández is one more tragedy in the long list of attacks on freedom of expression in Colombia. The Colombian authorities must do everything in their power to ensure that this new crime does not go unpunished."

Additionally, upon hearing of Topasco's sentence, Gustavo Mohme, President of the IAPA and editor of the newspaper La República, said, “At last justice has been done,” he added that this was “a great piece of news to celebrate for Orlando Sierra’s memory, for the suffering of the members of his family, for the honor of the La Patria colleagues, and for justice for all murdered Colombian journalists whose cases continue to go unpunished.”

== See also ==
- Human rights in Colombia
