= Heinz Traimer =

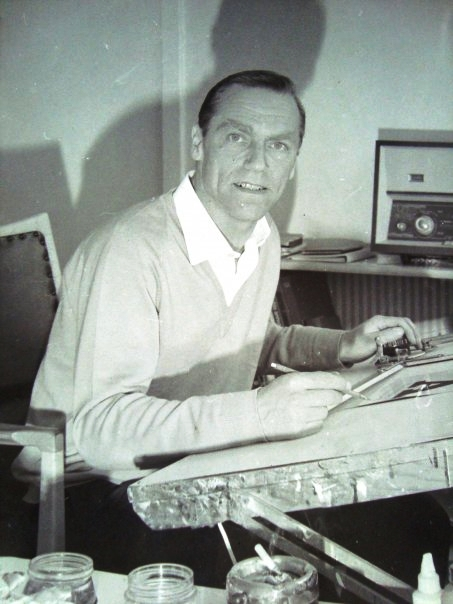
- Graphic designer Heinz Traimer, Vienna c. 1970
- Born: September 30, 1921; Schondorf, Germany
- Died: February 8, 2002 (aged 80); Vienna, Austria
- Education: Blocherer School, Graphics Industry Academy
- Known for: graphic design

Heinz Traimer (September 30, 1921 – February 8, 2002) was a German graphic designer and advertising copywriter who lived and worked in Vienna. He was the chief graphic designer for the Austrian bank Zentralsparkasse between 1955 and 1970. Among his awards was a national prize for the best advertising campaign of 1976. Traimer's posters are held in numerous Vienna collections.

== Early life ==
Heinz Karl Wolfgang Traimer was born on 21 September 1921 in Schondorf, Bavaria. His parents Heinrich and Hilde Traimer were both teachers. His father died in 1926, after which he and his two sisters moved to Augsburg with their mother.

In 1940, after he graduated from the Altes Real Gymnasium (grammar school) in Munich, he was drafted into the German Wehrmacht, in which he served as a radio operator on army trains until 1945. Between 1945 and 1946 he was a prisoner of war in Russia, where he contracted polio.

== Career ==
Traimer trained in Munich at the Blocherer School, and at the Graphics Industry Academy, where he was taught by graphic designers Eduard Ege and Eberhard Hoelscher, who was the president of the Association of Professional German Communications Designers. After graduating and winning competitions, Traimer was employed by the Suedgraphik agency and became associated with bank advertising. He moved to Vienna, where he was employed as a studio manager at the Koszler advertising agency, and probably created his first advertisements for the Zentralsparkasse. Traimer became a member of the Austrian graphic design organization "BÖG" (today called designaustria).

Traimer established his own business in 1956, and, with his wife, started the silk-screen printing studio, Kahlenberg-Graphik. The Austrian Saving Banks Group became his chief customer.

Until 1970 his work was characterized by fast simple sketches, often with humorous content, aimed at young people and the middle and working classes. Many of his colourful and narrative posters gave money saving advice. With people's growing affluence, bank poster art began to reflect lifestyle motifs using photography; a technique which Traimer did not care for.

Traimer's graphic art appeared on posters, in newspapers and magazines, at the cinema and on public buildings, buses, and trams, while providing advertisements for television and radio. His clients included the automobile club ARBÖ, the electronics company Kapsch, the city of Vienna, the Social Democratic Party and private customers.

== Estate ==
When Traimer died in 2002 he left an estate of nearly 2,500 objects including more than 300 posters, now housed privately in Vienna. Traimer's work is held in museum and archive collections of the Erste Foundation, Albertina, Vienna Museum, Vienna Library, Museum of Applied Arts, Austrian National Library and the Tram Museum.

Heinz Traimer poster designs
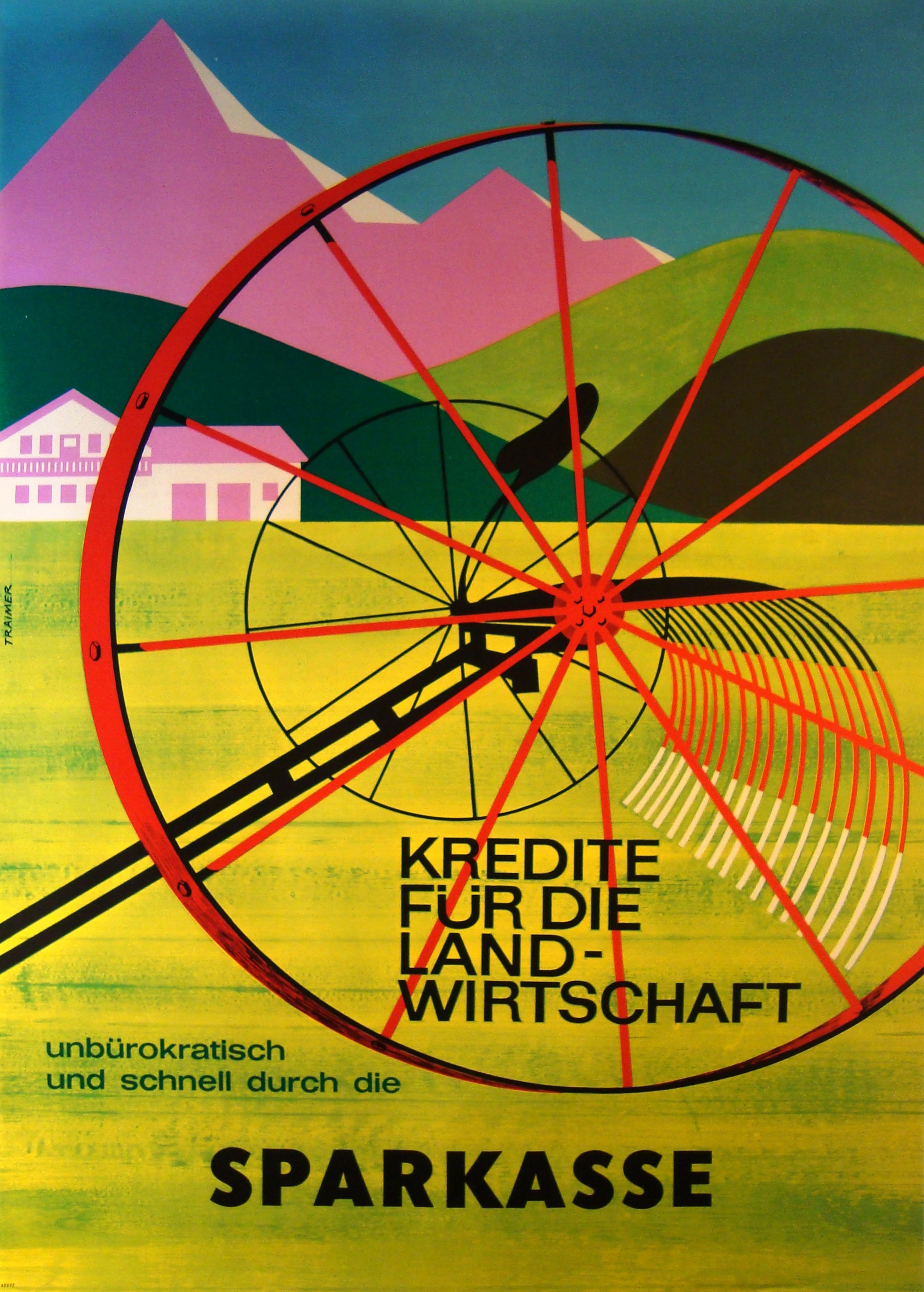
Poster from the Savings Bank of Austria - loans for farmers, 1961.

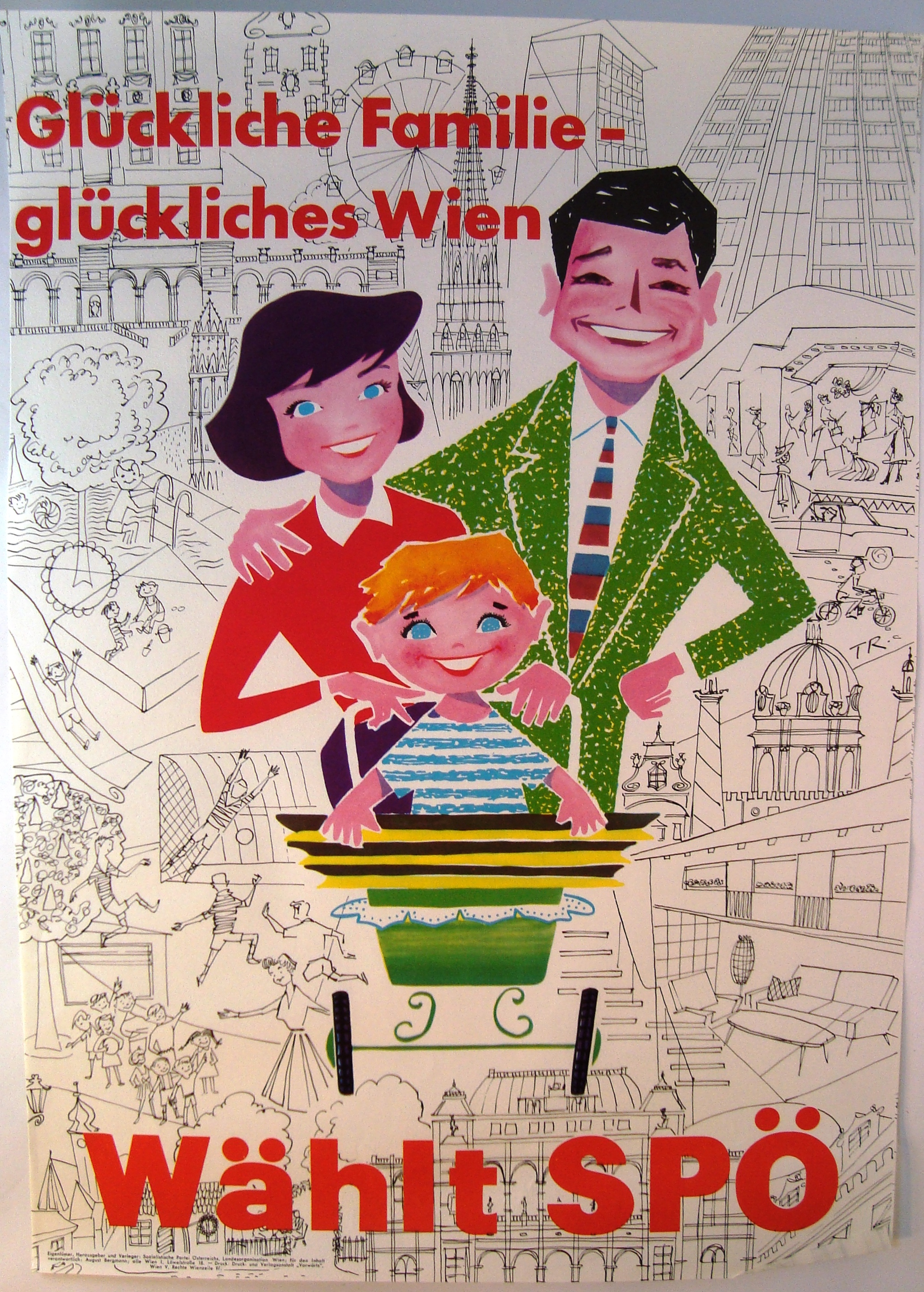
Poster for the Social Democratic Party of Austria (SPOE) 1959?. Happy family - Happy Vienna. Vote for SPOE.

== Bibliography ==
- Bechtle, Matthias (2012). Heinz Traimer - Diplomarbeit, (diploma thesis ms.). Universität Wien (University of Vienna). DA.-2012/52 (University of Vienna (Austria) Research Library).
