= Reg Gross (footballer) =

Australian rules footballer (1910–2002)

Personal information
- Full name: Reginald Spencer Gross
- Born: 13 June 1910; Quambatook, Victoria
- Died: 4 February 2002 (aged 91); Bendigo, Victoria
- Original team: Quambatook
- Height: 180 cm (5 ft 11 in)
- Weight: 78 kg (172 lb)

Playing career^{1}
Years	Club	Games (Goals)
1933, 1935, 1939	Geelong	16 (0)
- ^{1} Playing statistics correct to the end of 1939.

Reginald Spencer Gross (13 June 1910 – 4 February 2002) was an Australian rules footballer who played with Geelong in the Victorian Football League (VFL).
