= Grabos =

Grabos may refer to:

- Grabos I, an Illyrian king who ruled in the 5th century BC
- Grabos II, an Illyrian king who ruled in the 4th century BC
