= Reg Morgan =

Australian rules footballer, born 1919

Personal information
- Full name: Reginald Henry Morgan
- Born: 9 October 1919; Richmond, Victoria
- Died: 12 February 2002 (aged 82); Kyneton, Victoria
- Original team: Northcote
- Height: 182 cm (6 ft 0 in)
- Weight: 76 kg (168 lb)

Playing career^{1}
Years	Club	Games (Goals)
1942	Carlton	3 (0)
- ^{1} Playing statistics correct to the end of 1942.

Reginald Henry Morgan (9 October 1919 – 12 February 2002) was an Australian rules footballer who played with Carlton in the Victorian Football League (VFL).
