= Athletics at the 1930 British Empire Games – Men's triple jump =

Men's triple jump at the Commonwealth Games

The men's triple jump event at the 1930 British Empire Games was held on 17 August at the Civic Stadium in Hamilton, Canada.

== Results ==
Rank	Name	Nationality	Result	Notes
1st place, gold medalist(s)	Gordon Smallacombe	Canada	48 ft 5 in (14.76 m)	
2nd place, silver medalist(s)	Reg Revans	England	46 ft 10 3/4 in (14.29 m)	
3rd place, bronze medalist(s)	Len Hutton	Canada	45 ft 7 1/4 in (13.90 m)	
4	George Sutherland	Canada	45 ft 1 1/4 in (13.75 m)	
5	Gregory Power	Newfoundland	44 ft 1 1/4 in (13.44 m)	
6	Ossie Johnson	New Zealand	43 ft 2 in (13.16 m)	
