= Boris Tamm =

Estonian cyberneticist

Boris Tamm (23 June 1930 Tallinn – 5 February 2002 Tallinn) was an Estonian cyberneticist.

In 1954, he graduated from Tallinn Polytechnical Institute in cybernetics speciality (cum laude). In 1970, he defended his doctoral thesis in Moscow.

From 1976 to 1991, he was the rector of Tallinn University of Technology.

In 2002, he was awarded with Order of the White Star, III class.
