= Ellen Demming =

American actress (1922–2002)

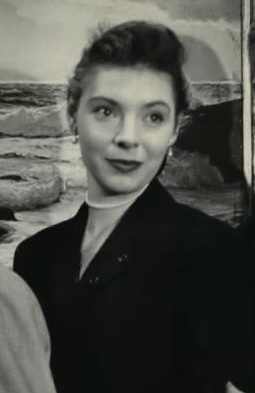
- Demming in 1953
- Born: Betty Ellen Weber; November 10, 1922
- Died: February 7, 2002 (aged 79)
- Occupation: actor

Ellen Demming (born Betty Ellen Weber; November 10, 1922 – February 7, 2002) was an American actress, best known for her role as Meta Bauer on the soap opera Guiding Light, which she played from 1953 to 1974.

== Life ==
A Schenectady, New York-born graduate of Stephens College, Demming also acted in off-Broadway and summer stock theatrical productions. She played Mary in Family Portrait. Brooks Atkinson deemed her performance, as the Virgin Mary, as full of "...pride, modesty, and great delicacy of feeling." After her retirement from The Guiding Light, she moved to South Salem, New York, and later, to Vermont.

== Personal life ==
She was married to television producer Hal Thompson. She died in 2002, aged 79, in Springfield, Vermont, from undisclosed causes.
