= Nemo Power Tools =

Underwater power tool manufacturer

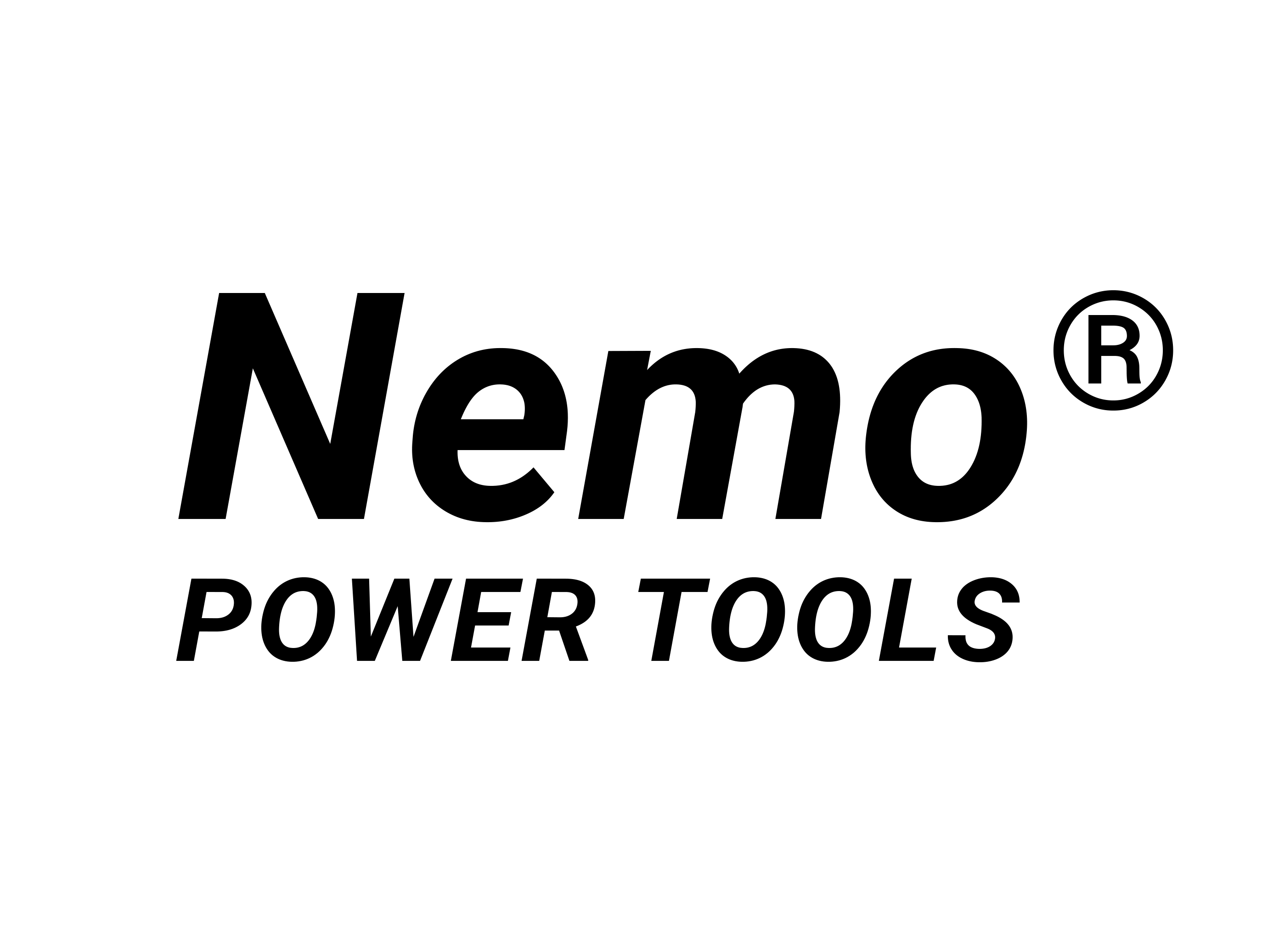
- Industry: Manufacturing
- Founded: 2014; 11 years ago
- Founder: Nimo Rotem
- Headquarters: 6000 S Eastern Ave, Las Vegas, NV, US
- Products: Power Tools
- Brands: Nemo Power Tools, GRABO
- Number of employees: >100
- Website: www.nemopowertools.com

Nemo Power Tools is the first and only manufacturer of a full line of power tools that are pressurized to work under water for boating, scuba and other deep sea activities. The company also uses the same technology to manufacture a clean room drill, the GRABO lifter and a special-ops line of underwater tools. The company was founded by Nimo Rotem and Oleg Zhukov.

== History ==
Nemo Power Tools was started in 2010 when founder Nimo Rotem was approached by the Israeli military about creating an underwater drill for them. At the time he wasn't even a certified diver and had to acquire his Padi Open Water certification as part of the development process. In 2013, Nimo and Oleg decided to expand the market for their tools to the commercial market.

Rotem built the first tool from scratch, featuring a durable die-cast aluminum body, powered by two 18-volt Li-ion batteries. It also includes a keyless metal chuck and a rotating seal, similar to those found in boat drive shafts. The initial drill was designed to go to work at a depth of up to 165 feet, making it the perfect tool for divers, boat repairs and scientific researchers.

A freshwater version that can operate in chlorine water was later developed, as well as a special ops line of hammer drill, with salt-water-resistant paint, no logos, that can operate in a depth of up to 328’. A similarly performing angle grinder was also developed under the special ops performance standards.

The company has continued to expand its underwater line of products to include a variety of drills, grinders, saws and a hull cleaner. The company also produces a 15,000 lumens underwater floodlight for working underwater.

Do to their unique ability to work in marine environments, their tools have been seen on a number of TV shows including being heavily featured by Dustin Hurt on the Discovery Channel's Gold Rush: White Water.

=== Clean Room Drill ===
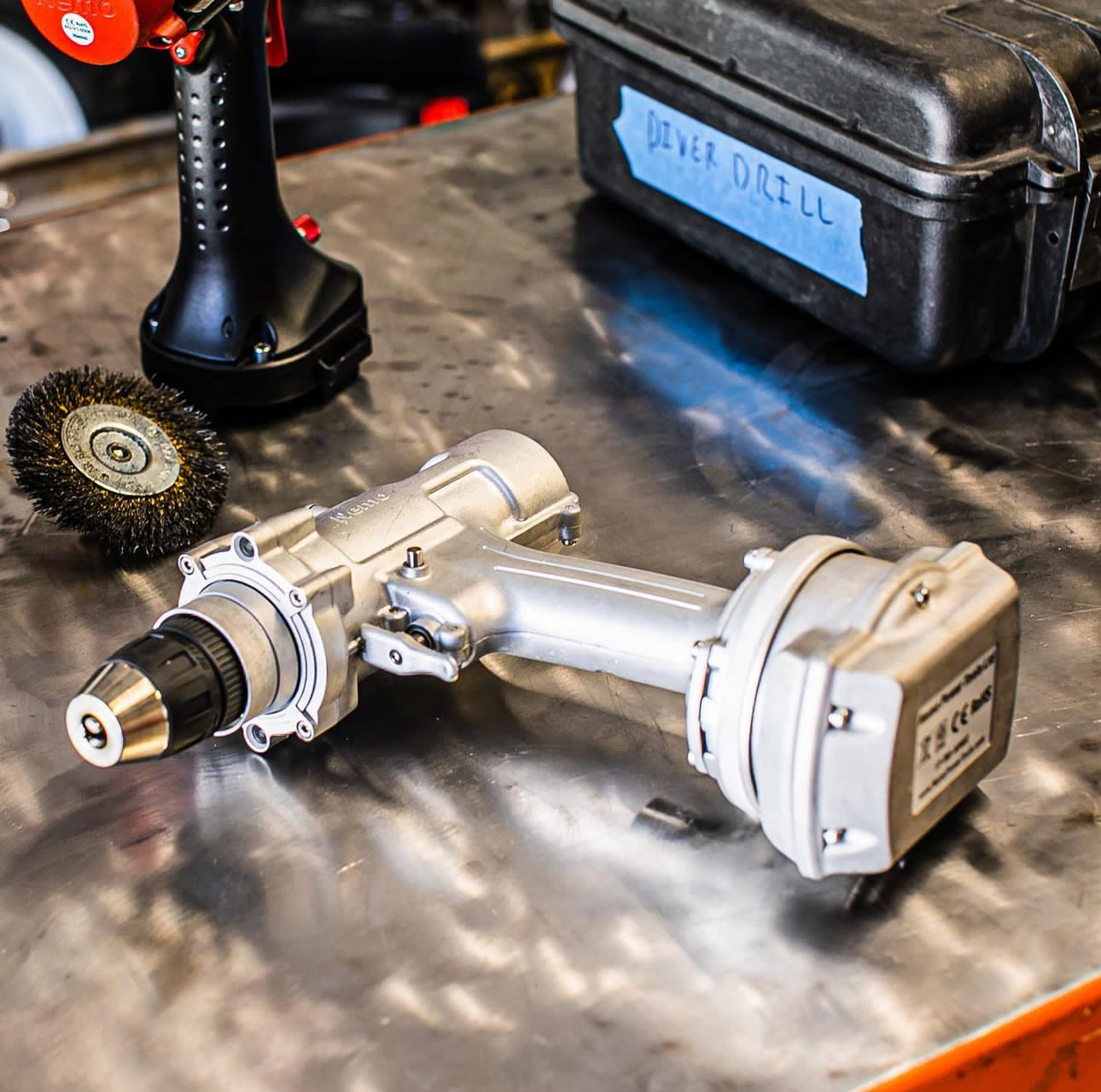
Nemo Power Tools Clean Room Drill and Hull Cleaner.

Using technology from their underwater tools, Nemo Power Tools created a clean room drill which seals the internal compartment and works with no internal ventilation, making the drill viable in clean room environments such as medical labs, pharmaceutical companies, and industrial manufacturing.

Manufactured with a sealed design and construction, the drill/driver generates minimal airborne particles. An independent third-party laboratory performed an airborne particle count statistical analysis, which confirmed that the Nemo Clean Room Drill satisfies the particulate requirements for an ISO Class 7 clean room at 0.5, 1.0, and 5.0 micrometers under operational conditions. This conclusion is based on the data collected and statistical analysis calculations in accordance with ISO 14644-1.

== GRABO ==
GRABO PRO - Lifter 20.

After working on a number of tools for the Nemo line of power tools, in 2019 Nemo and Oleg began playing with some of the technology they had developed and created the GRABO using sealing and fabrication methods from the marine industry. The GRABO product line didn't fit in with the underwater power tool brand and in 2020 this brand split off from Nemo Power Tools and became its own product line.

The GRABO is a portable, battery-operated vacuum lifter designed to handle a wide range of materials, including tiles, metal, pavers, glass, and plywood and drywall sheet goods. Its dual-seal system is effective even on uneven surfaces like textured glass, riven tiles, and rough paving, as well as on dusty or wet areas. What sets it apart is its ability to grip textured materials as well as porous materials, such as plasterboard, plywood, and certain porous stones, by continuously running its vacuum motor to offset air loss through the material. The GRABO can lift up to 375 lbs.

In 2024, the company entered into a licensing partnership with Stanley Black & Decker to create and distribute the DeWalt GRABO. Popular Mechanics recognized the GRABO PRO model as a tool of the year in their Tool Awards 2025. The GRABO HIGH FLOW was launched in 2025, marking a milestone in the company as creating the worlds only battery operated suction tool that achieves grip on extremely porous materials, which got the award for tool of the year by the Pro Tool Reviews Pro Tool Innovations Awards.

== Links ==
- Official website
- Grabo
