= John Spezzaferro =

American football player and coach (1921–2002)

Biographical details
- Born: August 1, 1921; Shaw Mines, Pennsylvania, U.S.
- Died: February 5, 2002 (aged 80); Westlake, Ohio, U.S.

Playing career
- 1940–1942: Heidelberg

Coaching career (HC unless noted)
- 1947: Heidelberg (freshmen)
- 1948–1949: Wilber Wright HS (OH)
- 1950: Holy Name HS (OH) (line)
- 1951: Chaminade Julienne HS (OH) (assistant)
- 1952: Dayton (line)
- 1976: Pittsburgh Steelers (offensive assistant)
- 1978–1980: Heidelberg

Head coaching record
- Overall: 4–23 (college)

John A. Spezzaferro (August 1, 1921 – February 5, 2002) was an American football player and coach. He served as the head football coach at Heidelberg University in Tiffin, Ohio from 1978 to 1980, compiling a record of 4–23. Spezzaferro had previously worked as an assistant football coach at the University of Dayton.

A veteran of World War II, Spezzaferro was noted for taking six bullets in the Pacific theater.

== Head coaching record ==
=== College ===
| Year | Team | Overall | Conference | Standing | Bowl/playoffs |
|---|---|---|---|---|---|
Heidelberg Student Princes (Ohio Athletic Conference) (1978–1980)
| 1978 | Heidelberg | 0–9 | 0–5 | 6th (Red) | |
| 1979 | Heidelberg | 1–8 | 0–5 | 6th (Red) | |
| 1980 | Heidelberg | 3–6 | 2–3 | T–3rd (Red) | |
| Heidelberg: | | 4–23 | 2–13 | | |
| Total: | | 4–23 | | | |
