= Johann Liebenberger =

Austrian water polo player (1930–2002)

Personal information
- Nationality: Austrian
- Born: 27 October 1930
- Died: 17 February 2002 (aged 71)

Sport
- Sport: Water polo

Johann Liebenberger (27 October 1930 – 17 February 2002) was an Austrian water polo player. He competed in the men's tournament at the 1952 Summer Olympics.
