= Oliver Weiss =

German-born American-based soccer coach

Personal information
- Place of birth: Germany

College career
Years	Team	Apps	(Gls)
- University of Richmond

Managerial career
- 2002-2009: Virginia Tech

Oliver Weiss is a German-born, U.S.-based soccer coach, who worked successfully over a 14-year span (1995–2009) at the NCAA division I level. He was the head men's soccer coach at Virginia Tech from 2002 through 2009.

== Career ==
Under Weiss Virginia Tech played in the national semifinals of the NCAA soccer tournament in 2007 and reaching a number 3 final national ranking. The program appeared in a total of four NCAA tournaments, all under Weiss' tutelage. His winning percentage of .574 and 73-52-17 win-loss-tie remain records at the school.

Weiss resigned from Tech in 2009 following a dispute over an unintended NCAA infraction. Although considered a minor and secondary violation, Weiss left the school citing personal reasons and other interests.

Prior to coaching at Tech, Weiss was an assistant coach at North Carolina from 1999 to 2001. During that span, UNC won its first national championship and went 54-14-1 in three NCAA tournament appearances. From 1996 to 1999, he served as an assistant at William & Mary, where the team posted a 49-19-3 record. He also spent one year as an assistant coach at the University of New Hampshire. He played college soccer at Richmond.
