= Fafnir Bearing =

American manufacturer of ball bearings

The Fafnir Bearing Company was a major American manufacturer of ball bearings.

== History ==
The company was founded in New Britain, Connecticut on March 8, 1911, by Howard Stanley Hart. Fafnir was acquired by Textron in 1968. In 1988, Textron's Fafnir Bearing division was acquired by the Torrington Company, which in turn sold it in 1998 to the Timken Company, which still markets ball bearings under the Fafnir brand.

During the Second World War, the 7,000 workers at Fafnir's 600,000 square foot factory in the center of New Britain turned out 100 ball bearings per minute. By 1946, Fafnir was the largest independent manufacturer of ball bearings in the United States, with exports to Canada, Latin America, Europe, Africa, the Middle East, Asia, and the South Pacific. Equipment manufactured at the Fafnir factory in New Britain traveled to the Moon on Apollo 11.
