= Sırrı Erinç =

Turkish geographer (1918–2002)

- Born: January 24, 1918; İzmit, Ottoman Empire
- Died: February 2, 2002 (aged 84); Istanbul, Turkey
- Occupation: Geographer
- Known for: Founder of Istanbul University Institute of Marine Sciences and Management

Sırrı Erinç (January 24, 1918 – February 8, 2002) was a Turkish geographer and lecturer.

== Life ==
Sırrı Erinç was born on January 24, 1918, in İzmit. In 1936 he graduated from Istanbul High School, learning German, French and Russian in the high school, and learning English at the university. After the graduation of the high school he enrolled in a higher teacher education school. Erinç graduated from this school in 1940 by taking the all courses from both Geography Institute and Geology Institute, and in the same year he was appointed as an assistant in Physical Geography department. Under Ord. Prof. İbrahim Hakkı Akyol he completed “Doğu Karadeniz Dağlarında Glasyal Morfoloji Araştırmaları” titled his doctoral thesis in 1944. He became an associate professor in 1948, and beginning to give lectures in same department, then in 1951-1952 he studied at Louisiana State and? Johns Hopkins Universities. In 1957 he became a professor, in 1958 studied in England and Germany.

From 1957 to 1982 he worked as a chairman at Geography Institute Physical Geography department, Istanbul University. Also, from 1982 to 1985 he worked as a director in Istanbul University Institute of Marine Sciences and Management that he founded himself. In 1995 he was selected as an honorary member for Turkish Academy of Sciences, afterwards being granted INQUA Turkey Quaternary Contribution award in 1997, TÜBİTAK award in 1998. He died on 8 February 2002.

== Works ==
Sırrı Erinç had more than 120 articles, 40 of which are in English. Also he wrote many encyclopedia articles and school books about regional geography.

Below are his selected some books:

- Doğu Anadolu Coğrafyası (1953)
- Tatbikî Klimatoloji ve Türkiye'nin İklim Şartları (1956)
- Türkiye Atlası (1961)
- Klimatoloji ve Metodları (1962)
- Yağış müessiriyeti Üzerine Bir Deneme ve Yeni Bir İndis (1964)
- 12 Mayıs 1971 Burdur Depremi (1971)
- Elli Yılda Coğrafya (1973)
- Vejetasyon Coğrafyası (1977)
- Jeomorfoloji cilt 1
- jeomorfoloji cilt 2

Below are Sırrı Erinç's the most important works in different languages:

1. 1949. Eiszeitlische Formen und gegenwärtige Vergletscherung im nordostanatolischen Randgebirge: Geologische Rundschau v. 27, ss.75-84
2. 1950. Climatic types and the variations of moisture regions in Turkey: The Geographical Review v. 40. pp. 224–235
3. 1953 Doğu Anadolu Coğrafyası: İstanbul Üniversitesi Yayınları no. 572; İstanbul Üniversitesi, Edebiyat Fakültesi, Coğrafya Enstitüsü Yayınları, no. 15,[II]+124 ss.
4. 1954. The Pleistocene history o f the Black Sea and the adjacent countries with special reference to the climatic changes. Review of the Geographical Institute of the University of Istanbul no. 1 ss. 84–133.
5. 1961. (T. Bilgin ve M. Bener ile) Gerede civarında akarsu şebekesi: İstanbul Üniversitesi Coğrafya Enstitüsü Dergisi, Sayı:12, ss. 90–99.
6. 1965. Yağış Müessiriyeti Üzerine Bir Deneme ve Yeni Bir İndis: İstanbul Üniversitesi, Edebiyat Fakültesi, Coğrafya Enstitüsü Yayınları, no. 41, 51 ss.
7. 1968–1971. Jeomorfoloji I, 2. baskı: İstanbul Üniversitesi Yayınları no. 789; İstanbul Üniversitesi, Edebiyat Fakültesi, Coğrafya Enstitüsü Yayınları, no. 23, XIV+[II]+539 ss. (3. baskısı 1982'de, 1. baskı 1958); Jeomorfoloji II, 2. baskı: İstanbul Üniversitesi Yayınları no. 1628; İstanbul Üniversitesi, Edebiyat Fakültesi, Coğrafya Enstitüsü Yayınları, no. 23, [VI]+489 ss. + 1 katlanır harita (1. baskı 1960).
8. 1969. Klimatoloji ve Metodları, 2. baskı: İstanbul Üniversitesi Yayınları no.994; İstanbul Üniversitesi, Edebiyat Fakültesi, Coğrafya Enstitüsü Yayınları, no. 35, IX+[VII]+538 ss. (1. baskı 1962)
9. 1970. Kula ve Adala arasında genç volkan reliefi: İstanbul Üniversitesi Coğrafya Enstitüsü Dergisi sayı 17, ss. 7-32.
10. 1978. Changes in the physical environment in Turkey since the end of the last glacial: in Brice, W. C., ed., The Environmental History of the Near and Middle East, Academic Press, London, ss. 87–110.

== Legacy ==
There are many geographical formations that are named after Sırrı Erinç. In 2022 a submarine plateau was named after Sırrı Erinç by TÜDAV. Also, a glacier in Cilo Dağı bears his name (Erinç glacier).
