= Mikhail Leitman =

Soviet inventor (1937–2002)

Mikhail Borisovich Leitman
- Born: Mikhail Borisovich Leitman; Михаил Борисович Лейтман; 14 January 1937; Baku, USSR
- Died: 11 February 2002 (aged 65); Rehovot, Israel
- Occupation: IT specialist
- Children: 1

Mikhail Borisovich Leitman (Russian: Михаил Борисович Лейтман; 14 January 1937, Baku — 11 February 2002, Rehovot) was an Azerbaijani scientist and an IT specialist.

== Early life ==
On 14 January 1947, Leitman was born as Mikhail Borisovich Leitman in Baku, USSR. Leitman's father was Boris Mikhailovich Leitman (1912—1970), one of the most prominent leaders of the construction industry of Azerbaijan SSR. Leitman's uncles Isaak Mikhailovich (1908-1938) and Saul Mikhailovich (1910-1990) were repeatedly persecuted in the 1920s and 1930s by Soviet authorities.

In 1953, Leitman graduated from Baku Secondary School.

== Education ==
In 1959, Leitman graduated from Azerbaijan Industrial Institute, with honors in Automation, Telemechanics and Electrical Measurement. In 1964 he defended his thesis and continued to work at the Institute. Leitman worked as an engineer and conducted research on the topic of methods of depth measurements in wells.

== Career ==
In August 1966, Leitman began working at the Department of Automation and Remote Control of the Smolensk branch of Moscow Power Engineering Institute (MPEI), and soon was appointed head of this Department.

Along with teaching, he conducted extensive scientific research work, on the basis of which he consulted post-graduate students, forming his own school in the field of Information technology. In August 1990 he emigrated from USSR and worked in several United States-based companies which established broadband Internet network and tried to solve other relevant IT problems.

== Personal life ==
Leitman died on 11 February 2002 in Rehovot, Israel.

He was the author of more than 200 scientific works. Veteran of Labour.

Leitman's son is Alexander Chernitsky, a Russian writer and historian.

=== Selected inventions ===
- The Power Measuring Converter. A.S. No. 1522116, 1989, USSR
- The Instrument for Active Power Measurement. A.S. No. 1406504, 1988, USSR
- The Measuring Converter of Power for Three-Phase Networks. A.S. No. 1397846, 1988, USSR
- The Active Power Measuring Converter. A.S. No. 1314276, 1987, USSR
- The Voltage to Frequency Measuring Converter. A.S. No. 1218464, 1986, USSR
- The Frequency Deviation Measuring Converter. A.S. No. 1213429, 1986, USSR
