= Paul Grabö =

Swedish politician (1918–2002)

Paul Grabö (25 May 1918 – 5 February 2002) was a Swedish politician. He was a member of the Centre Party.
