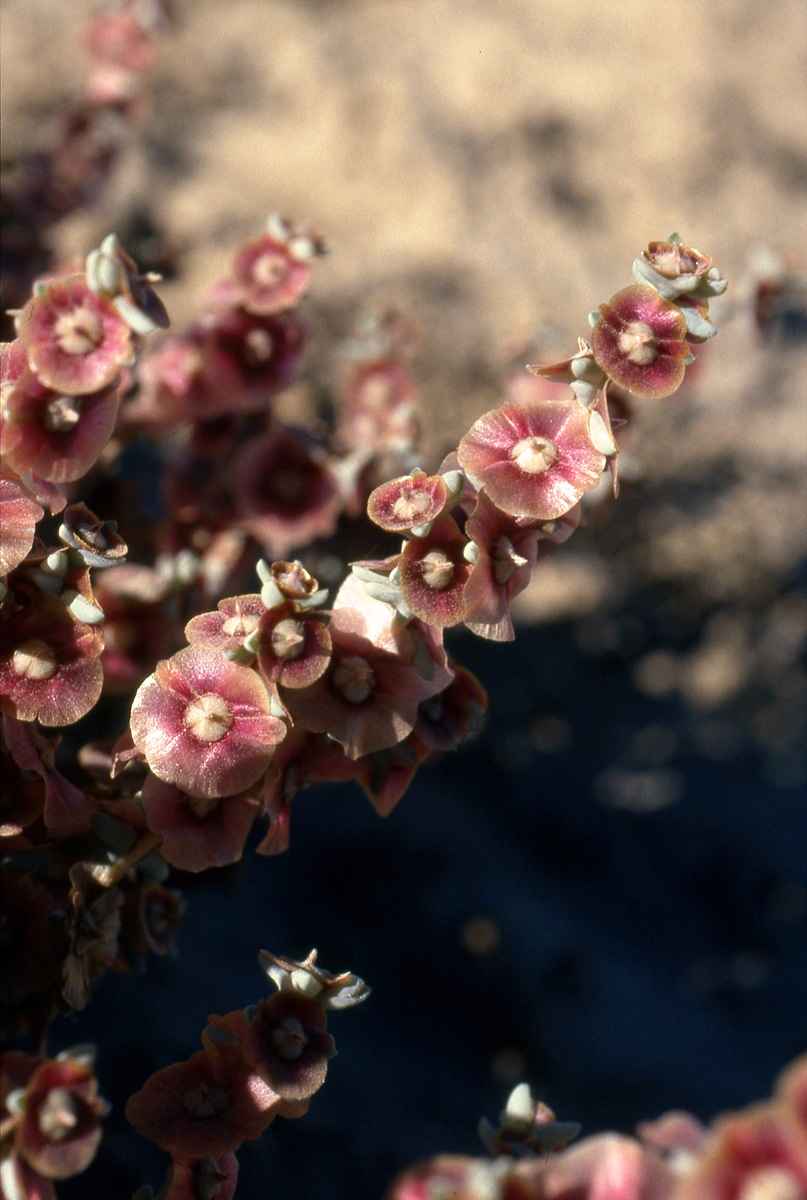
- Climacoptera turcomanica

Scientific classification
- Kingdom: Plantae
- Clade: Tracheophytes
- Clade: Angiosperms
- Clade: Eudicots
- Order: Caryophyllales
- Family: Amaranthaceae
- Genus: Climacoptera; Botsch.

= Climacoptera (plant) =

Genus of flowering plants

Climacoptera is a genus of flowering plants belonging to the family Amaranthaceae.

Its native range is Temperate Asia.

Species:

- Climacoptera afghanica Botsch.
- Climacoptera amblyostegia (Botsch.) Botsch.
- Climacoptera aralensis (Iljin) Botsch.
- Climacoptera botschantzevii U.P.Pratov
- Climacoptera bucharica (Iljin) Botsch.
- Climacoptera canescens (Moq.) G.L.Chu
- Climacoptera chorassanica U.P.Pratov
- Climacoptera crassa (M.Bieb.) Botsch.
- Climacoptera czelekenica U.P.Pratov
- Climacoptera ferganica (Drobow) Botsch.
- Climacoptera intricata (Iljin) Botsch.
- Climacoptera iranica U.P.Pratov
- Climacoptera iraqensis Botsch.
- Climacoptera kasakorum (Iljin) Botsch.
- Climacoptera khalisica Botsch.
- Climacoptera korshinskyi (Drobow) Botsch.
- Climacoptera lachnophylla (Iljin) Botsch.
- Climacoptera lanata (Pall.) Botsch.
- Climacoptera longipistillata Botsch.
- Climacoptera longistylosa (Iljin) Botsch.
- Climacoptera maimanica (Freitag) Akhani
- Climacoptera malyginii (Korovin ex Botsch.) Botsch.
- Climacoptera merkulowiczii (Zakirov) Botsch.
- Climacoptera minkvitziae (Korovin) Botsch.
- Climacoptera narynensis U.P.Pratov
- Climacoptera obtusifolia (Schrenk) Botsch.
- Climacoptera olgae (Iljin) Botsch.
- Climacoptera oxyphylla U.P.Pratov
- Climacoptera pjataevae U.P.Pratov
- Climacoptera ptiloptera U.P.Pratov
- Climacoptera subcrassa (Popov) Botsch.
- Climacoptera sukaczevii Botsch.
- Climacoptera susamyrica U.P.Pratov
- Climacoptera transoxana (Iljin) Botsch.
- Climacoptera turcomanica (Litv.) Botsch.
- Climacoptera turgaica (Iljin) Botsch.
- Climacoptera tyshchenkoi U.P.Pratov
- Climacoptera ustjurtensis U.P.Pratov
- Climacoptera vachschi Kinzik. & U.P.Pratov
- Climacoptera zenobiae (Mouterde) Botsch.
