= Keith Wilson =

Keith Wilson may refer to:

- Keith Wilson (mayor), American businessperson and mayor of Portland, Oregon
- Keith Wilson (cricketer) (1894–1977), English cricketer
- Keith Wilson (musician) (1916–2013), American clarinetist and Yale University music instructor
- Keith Wilson (production designer) (1941–2011), British television and film production designer
- Keith Wilson (sailor) (born 1937), Canadian Olympic sailor
- Keith Wilson (shearer), New Zealand shearer
- Keith Wilson (South Australian politician) (1900–1987), senator for South Australia and later federal member for Sturt
- Keith M. Wilson (1944–2018), historian and author
- Keith Wilson (footballer) (1935–2000), Australian rules footballer
- Keith Wilson (Western Australian politician) (born 1936), member of the Western Australian Legislative Assembly, 1977–1993
- Keith Wilson (artist), British artist
- J. Keith Wilson, American Asian art curator
- Keith Wilson, NASCAR crew chief for Jimmy Means Racing during the 1990s
