= Trimingham (surname) =

Trimingham is a surname. Notable people with the surname include:

- DeForest Wheeler Trimingham (1919–2007), Bermudian sailor
- Ernest Trimingham (1880–1942), Bermudian actor
- J. Spencer Trimingham (1904–1987), British missionary and scholar of Islam
- Jim Trimingham, American politician
