= Sailing at the 1960 Summer Olympics – Flying Dutchman =

Flying Dutchman at the Games of the XVII Olympiad
- Olympics 1960 Configuration
- Venue: Naples
- Competitors: 64 from 31 nations
- Teams: 31

Medalists
1st place, gold medalist(s)		Peder Lunde Jr. Bjørn Bergvall	Norway
2nd place, silver medalist(s)		Hans Fogh; Ole Gunnar Petersen	Denmark
3rd place, bronze medalist(s)		Rolf Mulka; Ingo Von Bredow	United Team of Germany

The Flying Dutchman was a sailing event on the Sailing at the 1960 Summer Olympics program in Naples. Seven races were scheduled. 64 sailors, on 31 boats, from 31 nations competed.

== Results ==
Rank	Helmsman (Country)	Crew	Yachtname	Sail No.	Race I		Race II		Race III		Race IV		Race V		Race VI		Race VII		Total Points	Total -1
Rank	Helmsman (Country)	Crew	Yachtname	Sail No.	Rank	Points	Rank	Points	Rank	Points	Rank	Points	Rank	Points	Rank	Points	Rank	Points	Total Points	Total -1
1st place, gold medalist(s)	Peder Lunde Jr. (NOR)	Bjørn Bergvall	Sirene	N 5	2	1291	2	1291	~~10~~	~~592~~	5	893	1	1592	3	1115	10	592	7366	6774
2nd place, silver medalist(s)	Hans Fogh (DEN)	Ole Gunnar Petersen	Skum	D 4	7	747	~~18~~	~~337~~	1	1592	8	689	5	893	1	1592	13	478	6328	5991
3rd place, bronze medalist(s)	Rolf Mulka (EUA)	Ingo Von Bredow, Achim Kadelbach	Macky VI	G 199	3	1115	10	592	13	478	2	1291	~~DSQ~~	~~0~~	6	814	1	1592	5882	5882
4	Alan David Butler (RHO)	Christopher Bevan	Peri	KR; 124	1	1592	~~DSQ~~	~~0~~	3	1115	16	388	4	990	10	592	3	1115	5792	5792
5	Ben Verhagen (NED)	Race: 1 - 5 Gerard Lautenschutz; Race: 6 & 7 Jaap Helder	Daisy	H 102	4	990	~~16~~	~~388~~	5	893	3	1115	6	814	7	747	5	893	5840	5452
6	Aleksandr Shelkovnikov (URS)	Viktor Pilchin	Nokaut II	SR; 12	16	388	5	893	4	990	~~DNF~~	~~101~~	3	1115	4	990	7	747	5224	5123
7	Slotty Dawes (GBR)	James Ramus	Beaver	K 46	~~14~~	~~446~~	1	1592	7	747	7	747	10	592	9	638	9	638	5400	4954
8	Murray Rae (NZL)	Ron Watson	Harmony	KZ; 14	9	638	3	1115	14	446	4	990	9	638	~~DNF~~	~~101~~	6	814	4742	4641
9	Pierre Siegenthaler (SUI)	Michel Buzzi	Fantasio III	Z 58	6	814	8	689	~~23~~	~~231~~	14	446	7	747	2	1291	14	446	4664	4433
10	Johnny Hooper (IRL)	Peter Gray	Three Leaves	IR; 1	11	551	~~19~~	~~314~~	11	551	1	1592	17	362	8	689	12	513	4572	4258
11	Juan Manuel Alonso-Allende (ESP)	Gabriel Laiseca	Tajamar	E 8	12	513	~~15~~	~~416~~	6	814	12	513	14	446	13	478	2	1291	4471	4055
12	Mario Capio (ITA)	Tullio Pizzorno	Aldebaran II	I 44	DNF	101	4	990	2	1291	~~DSQ~~	~~0~~	12	513	5	893	17	362	4150	4150
13	Imre Holényi (HUN)	Albin Molnár	Balaton	M l	20	291	12	513	9	638	11	551	2	1291	~~DNF~~	~~101~~	20	291	3676	3575
14	Jean-Claude Cornu (FRA)	Daniel Gouffier	Calypse II	F 23	10	592	9	638	12	513	6	814	20	291	14	446	~~21~~	~~270~~	3564	3294
15	Hellmut Stauch (RSA)	Bob Standing	Hakahana	SA; 78	5	893	13	478	17	362	~~20~~	~~291~~	19	314	11	551	15	416	3305	3014
16	DeForest Wheeler Trimingham (BER)	Dick Divall	Bermudian	KB; 1	23	231	7	747	~~24~~	~~212~~	18	337	16	388	19	314	4	990	3219	3007
17	Carl Auteried (AUT)	Harald Fereberger	Evita VI	OE; 17	13	478	24	212	8	689	17	362	11	551	~~DNF~~	~~101~~	8	689	3082	2981
18	Rolly Tasker (AUS)	Ian Palmer	Falcon VI	KA; 1	17	362	11	551	19	314	9	638	8	689	20	291	~~23~~	~~231~~	3076	2845
19	Harry Robert Sindle (USA)	Robert Wood	Vim III	US; 404	~~DNF~~	~~101~~	6	814	15	416	10	592	27	161	17	362	18	337	2783	2682
20	Tony Bentley-Buckle (KEN)	Ronald Blaker	Kenya	KK; 106	8	689	14	446	~~DNF~~	~~101~~	13	478	15	416	18	337	19	314	2781	2680
21	Jacques De Brouwere (BEL)	André Maes	Meteor	B 5	18	337	~~22~~	~~250~~	21	270	19	314	13	478	12	513	16	388	2550	2300
22	Pierre Desjardins (CAN)	Keith Wilson	Mad Dog	KC; 14	22	250	21	270	18	337	15	416	~~DNF~~	~~101~~	15	416	11	551	2341	2240
23	Konstantinos Lymberakis (GRE)	Stylianos Kyriakidis	Olympion	GE; 11	~~24~~	~~212~~	20	291	16	388	24	212	22	250	16	388	22	250	1991	1779
24	Christian Vinge (SWE)	Bengt Waller	Sjovinge	S 17	19	314	23	231	~~26~~	~~177~~	21	270	18	337	23	231	25	194	1754	1577
25	Godfrey Lightbourn (BAH)	Sigmund Pritchard	Combine	BA; 1	15	416	~~DNF~~	~~101~~	25	194	22	250	26	177	22	250	24	212	1600	1499
26	Richter Wolfgang Edgard (BRA)	Roberto da Rosa	Terrible	BL; 11	21	270	17	362	20	291	23	231	21	270	~~DNS~~	~~0~~	DNS	0	1424	1424
27	Carlos Braga (POR)	Gabriel Lopes	Calcinhas	P 8	25	194	25	194	22	250	26	177	25	194	21	270	~~27~~	~~161~~	1440	1279
28	Lie Eng Soei (INA)	Leopold Kalesaran	Tengiri	RI; 1	26	177	~~DNF~~	~~101~~	27	161	25	194	23	231	DNF	101	26	177	1142	1041
29	Khin Pe Gyi (BIR)	Park Wing Chow	Yangon	BR; 1	27	161	27	161	29	130	27	161	24	212	~~DNS~~	~~0~~	28	145	970	970
30	Richard Bennett (BWI)	Gerald Bird	Circus	KI; 25	28	145	28	145	28	145	28	145	~~DNF~~	~~101~~	24	212	DNS	0	893	893
31	Fred Zebouni (LIB)	Antoine Sader	Maid Of Lebanon	LE; 12	29	130	26	177	~~DNF~~	~~101~~	DNS	0	DNS	0	DNS	0	DNS	0	408	408

DNF = Did Not Finish, DNS= Did Not Start, DSQ = Disqualified
= Male, = Female

=== Daily standings ===
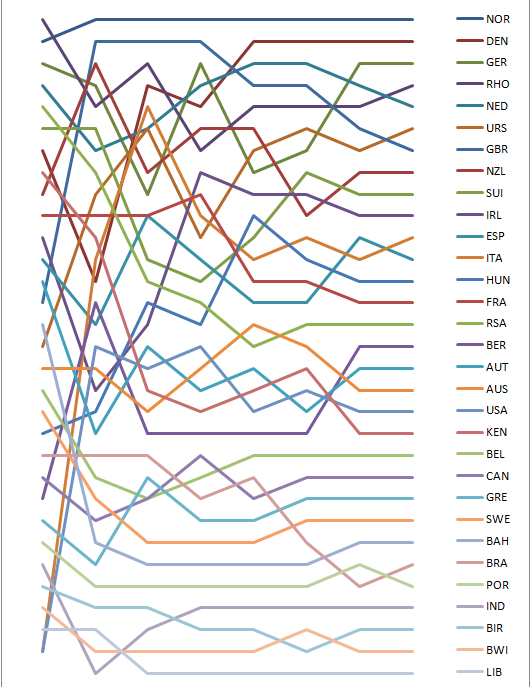
Graph showing the daily standings in the Flying Dutchman during the 1960 Summer Olympics

== Conditions at Naples ==
Of the total of three race areas were needed during the Olympics in Naples. Each of the classes was using the same scoring system. The center course was used for the Flying Dutchman.

Date	Race	Sea	Wind direction	Wind speed (m/s)
29 August 1960	I	Calm	SSW	4-5
30 August 1960	II	Calm	SW	3
31 August 1960	III	Slightly rough	W	6-8
1 September 1960	IV	Calm	SSW	3-4
5 September 1960	V	Calm	SSW	6-7
6 September 1960	VI	Sea force two	WSW	4-5
7 September 1960	VII	Sea force 1	WSW	6-7
