= Ving =

Ving may refer to:

- Ving Rhames (born 1959), American actor
- Ving'hawe, administrative ward in the Mpwapwa district of the Dodoma Region of Tanzania
- Lee Ving (born Lee James Capalero in 1949), lead singer of the 1980s punk band Fear
- Star-ving, web series of eight to ten minutes episodes surrounding the life of David Faustino from Married with Children

== See also ==
- Vinge, a surname
