= Water Polo Arena =

Temporary sporting venue of the 2012 Summer Olympics held in London

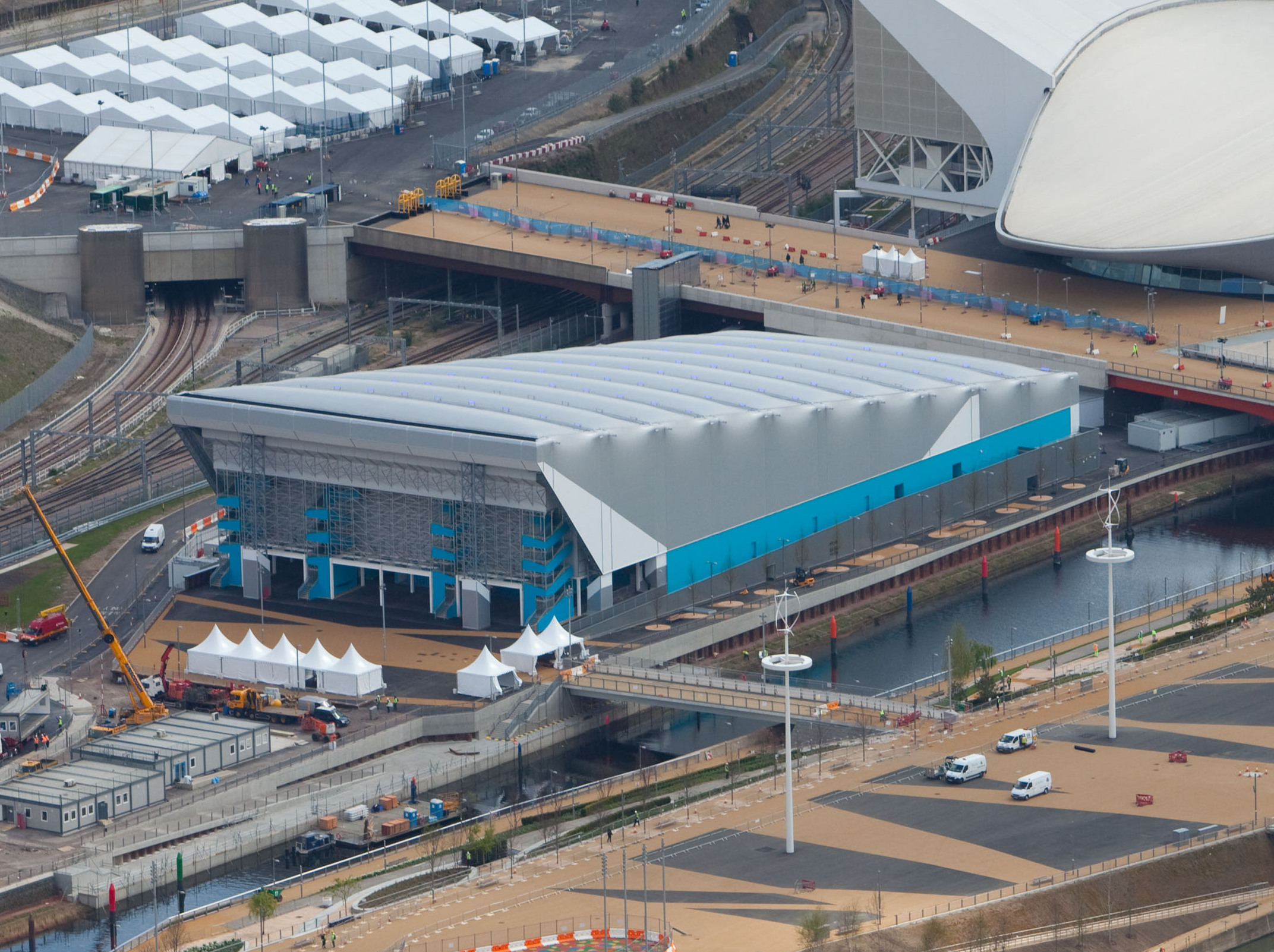
- The Water Polo Arena in April 2012
- Interactive map of Water Polo Arena
- Address: Olympic Park, London
- Coordinates: 51.54153°N 0.01292°W
- Capacity: 5,000

Construction
- Built: 2011–2012
- Closed: 2012
- Demolished: 2012
- Architect: David Morley Architects

Tenant
- 2012 Summer Olympics

The Water Polo Arena was a temporary sporting venue of the 2012 Summer Olympics held in London from 27 July to 12 August 2012. It was situated in the south-east corner of the Olympic Park, alongside the Aquatics Centre, and opposite the Olympic Stadium on the opposite bank of the Waterworks River.

The Aquatics Centre and Water Polo Arena were adjacent to each other in one of the most compact areas of the park. To make the best use of the space available, some back-of-house facilities, such as space for broadcasters, catering and security, were shared between the two venues.

== Construction ==
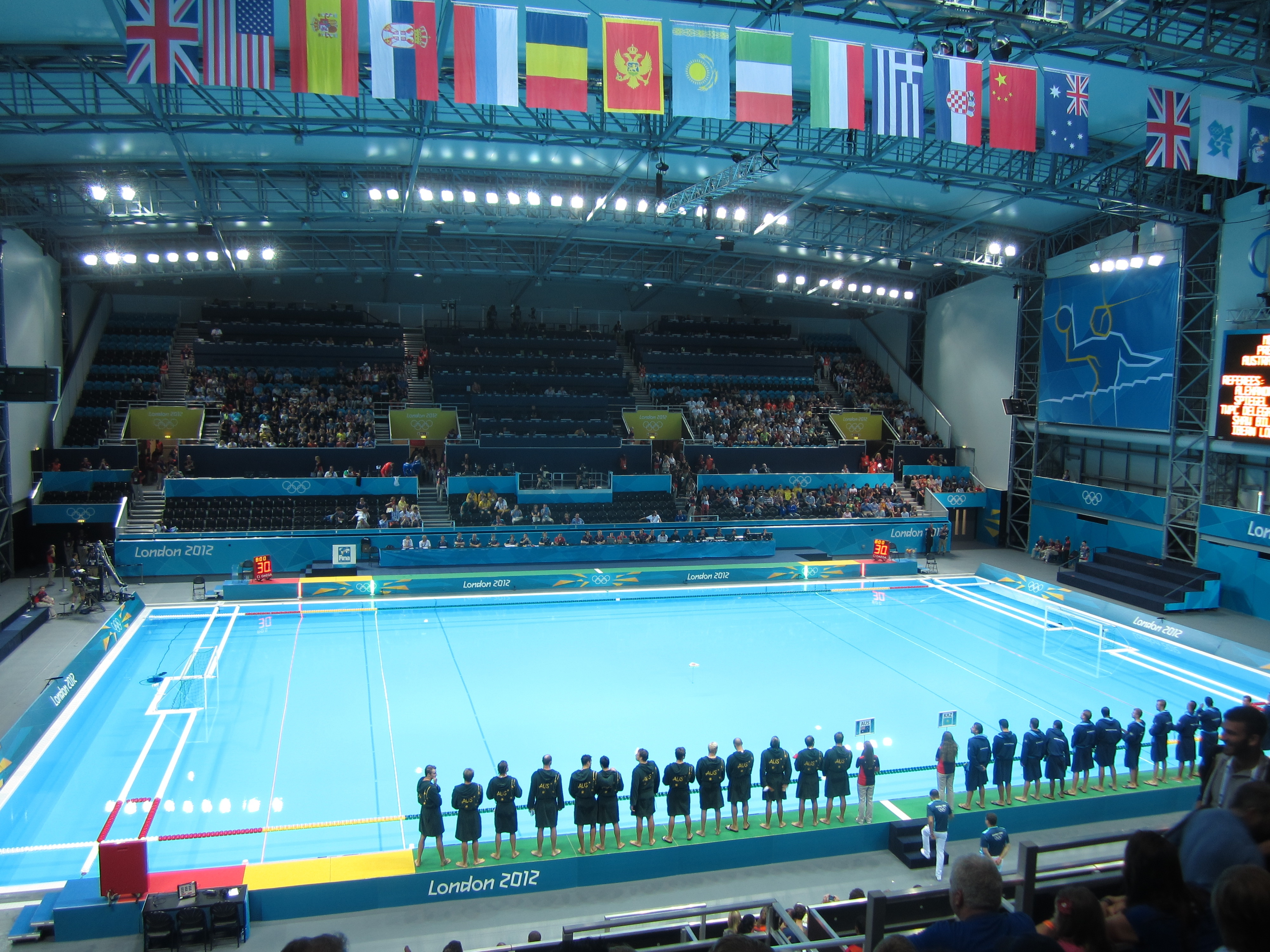
Inside the Water Polo Arena

Construction on the temporary structure began in spring 2011. During the Olympics, the 5,000-seat arena hosted both the men's and women's water-polo competitions, and contained both a warm-up pool and a 37-metre (121-foot) competition pool.

The first dedicated water-polo venue to be built for an Olympics, the structure was taken down after the games. Elements of the venue were expected to be reused or relocated elsewhere. Parts of the roofing covers and membranes of different temporary venues of the building were to be recycled via Vinyloop. This allowed the organizers to meet the standards of the Olympic Delivery Authority, concerning environmental protection. Through this recycling process, the Olympic Games PVC Policy was to be fulfilled, which stated that where London 2012 procured PVC for temporary usage or where permanent usage was not assured, London 2012 was required to ensure that there was a take-back scheme that offered a closed loop reuse system or mechanical recycling system for post-consumer waste.

London 2012 were the first Olympic Games whose guidelines included the recycling of PVC. Recycled cushions, which form part of the rippling PVC roof, were used to create the striking looking venue, as well as to improve insulation and prevent condensation.

== See also ==
- Venues of the 2012 Summer Olympics and Paralympics
- List of Olympic venues in water polo
