= Vinge =

Vinge is a surname shared by several notable people, among them being:

- Christian Vinge (born 1935), Swedish sailor
- Henrik Vinge (born 1988), Swedish politician
- Joan D. Vinge (born 1948), American science fiction author
- Rasmus Eggen Vinge (born 2001), Norwegian footballer
- Vernor Vinge (1944–2024), American science fiction author and professor

== See also ==
- Sønder Vinge runestone 2, Denmark
- Vinge Tunnel, the name Bortne Tunnel had during construction
- Ving (disambiguation)
