= Sader =

Sader may refer to:

== People ==
- Alan Sader (born 1940), American actor
- Antoine Sader (born 1929), Lebanese sailor
- Emir Sader (born 1943), Brazilian sociologist
- Maroun Khoury Sader (1926–2015), Lebanese archeparch
- Steve Sader (died 1946), American football player

== Other uses ==
- Sader Ridge, 2013 American psychological thriller film
- Secretariat of Agriculture and Rural Development, Mexican governmental agency
