= Fred Zebouni =

Lebanese sailor (1914–2014)

Frederick Hanna Zebouni (27 January 1914 – 27 April 2014) was a Lebanese sailor who competed at the 1960 Summer Olympics, where he finished 31st alongside Antoine Sader in the Flying Dutchman class. Born in Istanbul, he was a member of Yacht Club Beirut and later moved to Baton Rouge, Louisiana, where he died in April 2014 at the age of 100.
