= Sigmund Pritchard =

Bahamian sailor

Personal information
- Nationality: Bahamian
- Born: 15 November 1929 Nassau, Bahamas
- Died: 18 February 2016 (aged 86) Nassau, Bahamas

Sport
- Sport: Sailing

Sigmund Pritchard (15 November 1929 – 18 February 2016) was a Bahamian sailor. He competed in the Flying Dutchman event at the 1960 Summer Olympics.
