= Peter Gray (sailor) =

Irish sailor (1935–2022)

Personal information
- Nationality: Irish
- Born: 14 August 1935; Dún Laoghaire, Ireland
- Died: 13 February 2022 (aged 86)

Sport
- Sport: Sailing

Peter Gray (14 August 1935 – 13 February 2022) was an Irish sailor. He competed in the Flying Dutchman event at the 1960 Summer Olympics. Gray died on 13 February 2022, at the age of 86.
