= Bob Standing =

South African sailor

Personal information
- Nationality: South African
- Born: 21 January 1928; Durban, South Africa
- Died: 27 February 2008 (aged 80); Riebeek West, South Africa

Sport
- Sport: Sailing

Bob Standing (21 January 1928 – 27 February 2008) was a South African sailor. He competed in the Flying Dutchman event at the 1960 Summer Olympics.
