= Achim Kadelbach =

German sailor

Personal information
- Full name: Hans-Joachim Kadelbach
- Nationality: German
- Born: 11 May 1939 (age 85); Berlin, Germany

Sport
- Sport: Sailing

Hans-Joachim "Achim" Kadelbach (German pronunciation: [ˈaxiːm ˈkaːdl̩ˌbax]; born 11 May 1939) is a German sailor. He competed in the Flying Dutchman event at the 1960 Summer Olympics.
