= Dick Divall =

Bermudian sailor (1926–1982)

Personal information
- Full name: Richard Harry Divall
- Nationality: Bermudian
- Born: 27 February 1926 Paget, Bermuda
- Died: April 1982 (aged 56) Bermuda

Sport
- Sport: Sailing

Richard Harry Divall (27 February 1926 – April 1982) was a Bermudian sailor. He competed in the Flying Dutchman event at the 1960 Summer Olympics. Divall died in Bermuda in April 1982, at the age of 56.
