= Carlos Braga =

Portuguese sailor

Personal information
- Full name: António Carlos Braga
- Nationality: Portuguese
- Born: 4 December 1920 Porto, Portugal

Sport
- Sport: Sailing

Carlos Braga (born 4 December 1920) was a Portuguese sailor. He competed in the Flying Dutchman event at the 1960 Summer Olympics.
