= Roberto da Rosa =

Brazilian sailor (1927–2021)

Personal information
- Full name: Roberto Ferreira da Rosa Ribeiro
- Born: 6 July 1927 São Paulo, Brazil
- Died: 4 May 2021 (aged 93) São Paulo, Brazil

Sport
- Sport: Sailing

Roberto Ferreira da Rosa Ribeiro (6 July 1927 – 4 May 2021) was a Brazilian sailor. He competed in the Flying Dutchman event at the 1960 Summer Olympics. Da Rose died in São Paulo on 4 May 2021, at the age of 93.
