= Albin Molnár =

Hungarian sailor (1935–2022)

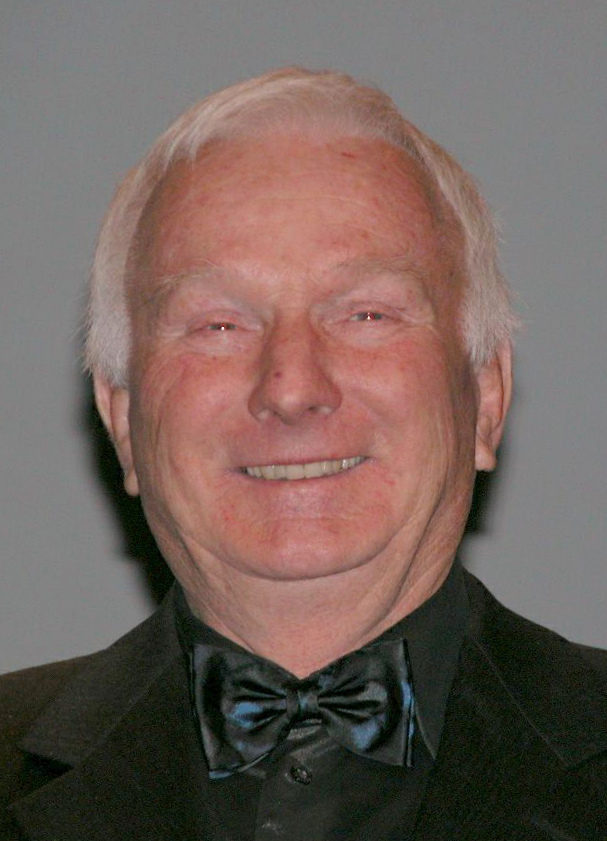
- Molnar in 2003

Personal information
- Nationality: Hungarian
- Born: 2 June 1935; Budapest, Hungary
- Died: 16 May 2022 (aged 86)
- Height: 183 cm (6 ft 0 in)

Sailing career
- Class: Flying Dutchman
- Club: Budapesti Épitök Sport Club

Albin Molnár (2 June 1935 – 16 May 2022) was a Hungarian sailor. He competed in the Flying Dutchman event at the 1960 Summer Olympics.
