= Jaap Helder =

Dutch sailor (1907–1998)

Personal information
- Full name: Jacob Helder
- Nationality: Dutch
- Born: 24 November 1907 Paterswolde
- Died: 13 January 1998 (aged 90) Paterswolde
- Height: 1.78 m (5.8 ft)

Sport

Sailing career
- Class: Flying Dutchman
- Updated on 2014-01-08

Jacob "Jaap" Helder (11 November 1907 in Paterswolde – 13 January 1998 in Paterswolde) is a sailor from the Netherlands, who represented his country at the 1960 Summer Olympics in Naples. After the 5th race Gerard Lautenschutz, who was crewing on the Dutch Flying Dutchman Daisy (H102), needed to go home due to family circumstances. Helder with helmsman Ben Verhagen crewed the last three races. The team took 5th place.

== Sources ==
- "Jaap Helder Bio, Stats, and Results". Olympic Sports. Sports-Reference.com. Archived from the original on 2014-01-08.
- "NEDERLANDS OLYMPISCHE EQUIPE" (in Dutch) (Day ed.). De Tijd De Maasbode. 1960-08-02.
- "Sleeswijk toch naar O.S." (in Dutch) (Day ed.). Nieuwsblad van het Noorden. 1960-08-09.
- "Weer een goede race van Verhagen Jaap Helder ook aan bod?" (in Dutch) (Day ed.). Nieuwsblad van het Noorden. 1960-09-02.
- "The Games of the XVII Olympiad Rome 1960, The Official Report of the Organizing Committee Volume One" (PDF). 1960. Archived from the original (pdf) on 2012-10-27.
- "The Games of the XVII Olympiad Rome 1960, The Official Report of the Organizing Committee Volume Two (a)" (PDF). 1960. Archived from the original (pdf) on 2011-05-23.
- "The Games of the XVII Olympiad Rome 1960, The Official Report of the Organizing Committee Volume Two (b)" (PDF). 1960. Archived from the original (pdf) on 2012-10-29.
