= Imre Holényi =

Hungarian sailor (1926–2020)

Personal information
- Nationality: Hungarian
- Born: 15 January 1926; Balatonfüred, Hungary
- Died: 2020 (aged 94)

Sport
- Sport: Sailing

Imre Holényi (15 January 1926 – 2020) was a Hungarian sailor. He competed in the Flying Dutchman event at the 1960 Summer Olympics.
