= Ben Verhagen =

Dutch sailor (1926–2020)

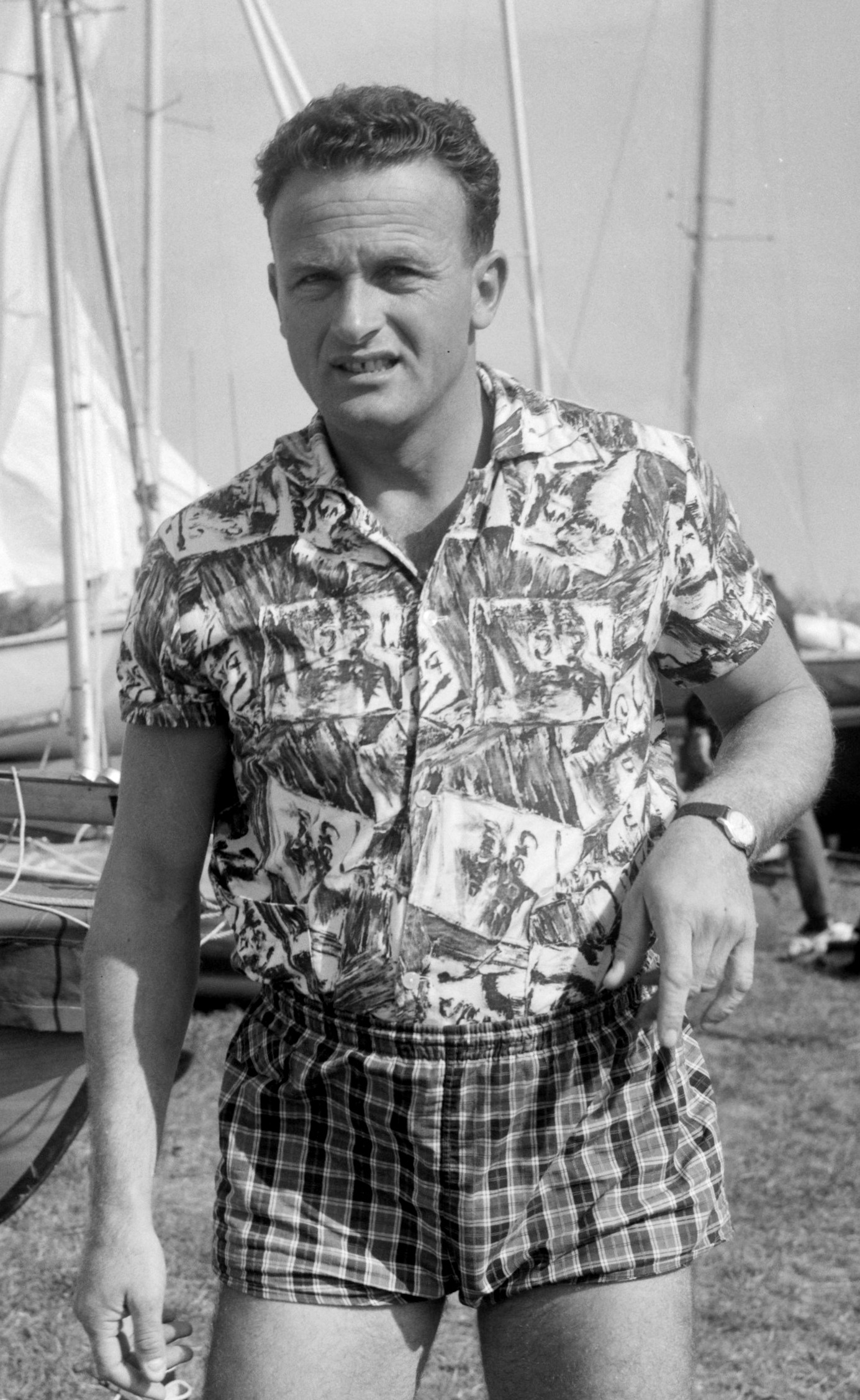
- Ben Verhagen in 1964

Personal information
- Full name: Gijsbertus "Ben" Verhagen
- Nickname: "Big Ben"
- Nationality: Dutch
- Born: 29 September 1926 Rotterdam, the Netherlands
- Died: 4 January 2020 (aged 93)
- Height: 1.80 m (5 ft 11 in)
- Weight: 84 kg (185 lb)

Sport

Sailing career
- Class(es): Flying Dutchman; Tempest; Soling
- Coach: Jacques Stap 1968

Gijsbertus "Ben" Verhagen (29 September 1926 – 4 January 2020) was a sailor from the Netherlands, who represented his country at the 1960 Summer Olympics in Naples. Verhagen, as helmsman on the Dutch Flying Dutchman Daisy (H102), took 5th place with crew Gerard Lautenschutz (race 1–5) and Jaap Helder (Race 6&7). During the 1964 Summer Olympics in Naples and 1968 Summer Olympics in Acapulco he again helmed Daisy (H157/H187), this time with Nick de Jong, and finished in 6th and 18th place, respectively.

For the 1976 Olympics Verhagen made an attempt in the Tempest but failed to qualify. He also tried the Soling in the late 1970s and the 1980s.

== Sources ==
- "Ben Verhagen Bio, Stats, and Results". Olympic Sports. Sports-Reference.com. Archived from the original on 18 April 2020.
- "NEDERLANDS OLYMPISCHE EQUIPE" (in Dutch) (Day ed.). De Tijd De Maasbode. 2 August 1960.
- "Sleeswijk toch naar O.S." (in Dutch) (Day ed.). Nieuwsblad van het Noorden. 9 August 1960.
- "Weer een goede race van Verhagen Jaap Helder ook aan bod?" (in Dutch) (Day ed.). Nieuwsblad van het Noorden. 2 September 1960.
- "The Games of the XVII Olympiad Rome 1960, The Official Report of the Organizing Committee Volume One" (PDF). 1960. Archived from the original (PDF) on 27 October 2012.
- "The Games of the XVII Olympiad Rome 1960, The Official Report of the Organizing Committee Volume Two (a)" (PDF). 1960. Archived from the original (PDF) on 23 May 2011.
- "The Games of the XVII Olympiad Rome 1960, The Official Report of the Organizing Committee Volume Two (b)" (PDF). 1960. Archived from the original (PDF) on 29 October 2012.
- "Zeilploeg voor Tokio bekend" (in Dutch). Het vrĳe volk : democratisch-socialistisch dagblad. 9 May 1964.
- "Kunde" (in Dutch) (Day ed.). De Telegraaf. 21 September 1964.
- "The Games of the XVIII Olympiad Tokio 1964, The Official Report of the Organizing Committee Volume One Part One" (PDF). 1964. Archived from the original (PDF) on 6 May 2010.
- "The Games of the XVIII Olympiad Tokio 1964, The Official Report of the Organizing Committee Volume One Part Two" (PDF). 1964. Archived from the original (PDF) on 18 November 2008.
- "The Games of the XVIII Olympiad Tokio 1964, The Official Report of the Organizing Committee Volume Two Part One" (PDF). 1964. Archived from the original (PDF) on 26 February 2008.
- "The Games of the XVIII Olympiad Tokio 1964, The Official Report of the Organizing Committee Volume Two Part Two" (PDF). 1964. Archived from the original (PDF) on 26 January 2009.
- "De Nederlandse afvaardiging" (in Dutch). Limburgsch dagblad. 11 October 1968.
- "Zeilers hebben geen tijd om uit te huilen" (in Dutch). De tĳd : dagblad voor Nederland. 9 November 1968.
- "The Games of the XIX Olympiad Mexico 1968, The Official Report of the Organizing Committee Volume One Part One" (PDF). 1968. Archived from the original (PDF) on 18 November 2008.
- "The Games of the XIX Olympiad Mexico 1968, The Official Report of the Organizing Committee Volume One Part Two" (PDF). 1968. Archived from the original (PDF) on 18 November 2008.
- "The Games of the XIX Olympiad Mexico 1968, The Official Report of the Organizing Committee Volume Two Part One" (PDF). 1968. Archived from the original (PDF) on 18 November 2008.
- "The Games of the XIX Olympiad Mexico 1968, The Official Report of the Organizing Committee Volume Two Part Two" (PDF). 1968. Archived from the original (PDF) on 18 November 2008.
- "The Games of the XIX Olympiad Mexico 1968, The Official Report of the Organizing Committee Volume Three Part One" (PDF). 1968. Archived from the original (PDF) on 26 February 2008.
- "The Games of the XIX Olympiad Mexico 1968, The Official Report of the Organizing Committee Volume Three Part Two" (PDF). 1968. Archived from the original (PDF) on 18 November 2008.
- "The Games of the XIX Olympiad Mexico 1968, The Official Report of the Organizing Committee Volume Four Part One" (PDF). 1968. Archived from the original (PDF) on 18 November 2008.
- "The Games of the XIX Olympiad Mexico 1968, The Official Report of the Organizing Committee Volume Four Part Two" (PDF). 1968. Archived from the original (PDF) on 18 November 2008.
