= Gerald Bird =

Trinidad and Tobago sailor (1928–2002)

Personal information
- Nationality: Trinidad and Tobago
- Born: 17 January 1928 Minster, Swale, England
- Died: 18 February 2002 (aged 74) Australia

Sport
- Sport: Sailing

Gerald Bird (17 January 1928 – 18 February 2002) was a Trinidad and Tobago sailor. He competed in the Flying Dutchman event at the 1960 Summer Olympics, representing the West Indies Federation.
