= Murray Rae =

New Zealand sailor

Personal information
- Nationality: New Zealand
- Born: 19 January 1939 (age 86); Auckland, New Zealand

Sport
- Sport: Sailing

Murray Rae (born 19 January 1939) is a New Zealand sailor. He competed in the Flying Dutchman event at the 1960 Summer Olympics.
