= Nick de Jong (sailor) =

Dutch sailor (born 1942)

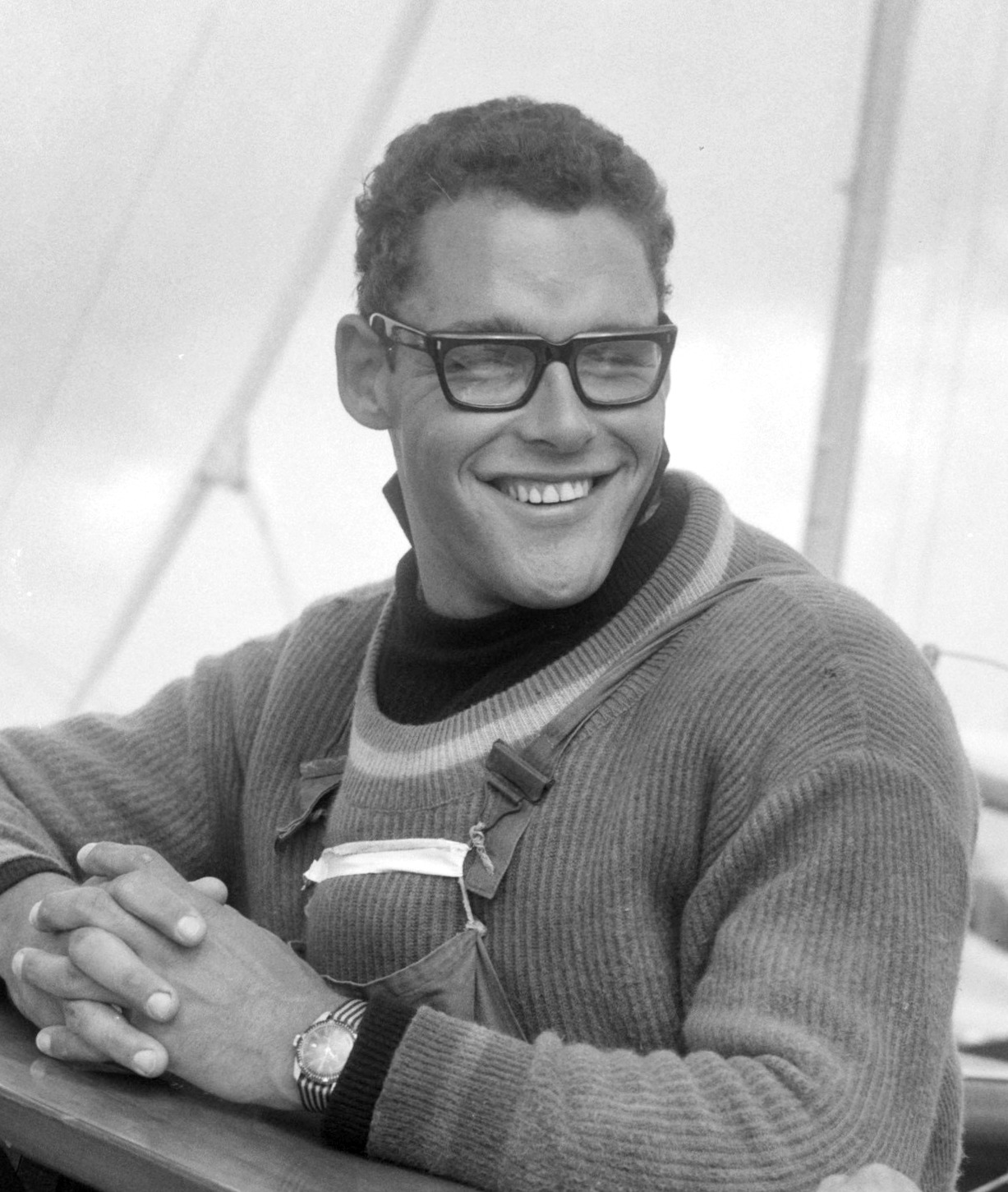
- Nick de Jong in 1964

Personal information
- Full name: Nicolaas Pieter "Nick" de Jong
- Nationality: Dutch
- Born: 25 March 1942 (age 84) Huizen, the Netherlands
- Height: 1.86 m (6 ft 1 in)
- Weight: 81 kg (179 lb)

Sailing career
- Sport: Sailing
- Coached by: Jacques Stap 1968
- Class(es): Flying Dutchman; Soling; Dragon
- Updated on 2014-01-08

Nicolaas Pieter "Nick" de Jong (born 25 March 1942) is a retired sailor from the Netherlands, who represented his country at the 1964 Summer Olympics in Enoshima. De Jong, as crew on the Dutch Flying Dutchman Daisy (H157), took the 6th place with helmsman Ben Verhagen. During the 1968 Summer Olympics in Acapulco he crewed Daisy (H187), again with helmsman Ben Verhagen to and an 18th place in the Flying Dutchman. For the 1972 Olympics De Jong made the switch from the Flying Dutchman to crew on the Soling with helmsman Heiki Blok and Rolf Kurpershoek. This team was nominated for the games by the KNWV. The nomination however did not resulted in a selection by the Dutch NOC.

Later De Jong was Chef d' équipe for the Dutch Olympic Sailing Team in 1992 and 1996. Nowadays De Jong helms the Dragon NED 22 and took part at the 2008 Vintage Yachting Games. Here he reached the 4th place with crew members Don van Arem and Miguel Karsters.

== Sources ==
- "Nick de Jong Bio, Stats, and Results". Olympic Sports. Sports-Reference.com. Archived from the original on 18 April 2020.
- "Zeilploeg voor Tokio bekend" (in Dutch). Het vrĳe volk : democratisch-socialistisch dagblad. 9 May 1964.
- "Kunde" (in Dutch) (Day ed.). De Telegraaf. 21 September 1964.
- "The Games of the XVIII Olympiad Tokio 1964, The Official Report of the Organizing Committee Volume One Part One" (PDF). 1964. Archived from the original (pdf) on 6 May 2010.
- "The Games of the XVIII Olympiad Tokio 1964, The Official Report of the Organizing Committee Volume One Part Two" (PDF). 1964. Archived from the original (pdf) on 18 November 2008.
- "The Games of the XVIII Olympiad Tokio 1964, The Official Report of the Organizing Committee Volume Two Part One" (PDF). 1964. Archived from the original (pdf) on 26 February 2008.
- "The Games of the XVIII Olympiad Tokio 1964, The Official Report of the Organizing Committee Volume Two Part Two" (PDF). 1964. Archived from the original (pdf) on 26 January 2009.
- "De Nederlandse afvaardiging" (in Dutch). Limburgsch dagblad. 11 October 1968.
- "Zeilers hebben geen tijd om uit te huilen" (in Dutch). De tĳd : dagblad voor Nederland. 9 November 1968.
- "The Games of the XIX Olympiad Mexico 1968, The Official Report of the Organizing Committee Volume One Part One" (PDF). 1968. Archived from the original (pdf) on 18 November 2008.
- "The Games of the XIX Olympiad Mexico 1968, The Official Report of the Organizing Committee Volume One Part Two" (PDF). 1968. Archived from the original (pdf) on 18 November 2008.
- "The Games of the XIX Olympiad Mexico 1968, The Official Report of the Organizing Committee Volume Two Part One" (PDF). 1968. Archived from the original (pdf) on 18 November 2008.
- "The Games of the XIX Olympiad Mexico 1968, The Official Report of the Organizing Committee Volume Two Part Two" (PDF). 1968. Archived from the original (pdf) on 18 November 2008.
- "The Games of the XIX Olympiad Mexico 1968, The Official Report of the Organizing Committee Volume Three Part One" (PDF). 1968. Archived from the original (pdf) on 26 February 2008.
- "The Games of the XIX Olympiad Mexico 1968, The Official Report of the Organizing Committee Volume Three Part Two" (PDF). 1968. Archived from the original (pdf) on 18 November 2008.
- "The Games of the XIX Olympiad Mexico 1968, The Official Report of the Organizing Committee Volume Four Part One" (PDF). 1968. Archived from the original (pdf) on 18 November 2008.
- "The Games of the XIX Olympiad Mexico 1968, The Official Report of the Organizing Committee Volume Four Part Two" (PDF). 1968. Archived from the original (pdf) on 18 November 2008.
- "ZEILPLOEG" (in Dutch). Het vrĳe volk : democratisch-socialistisch dagblad. 20 June 1972.
- "OS-zeilers" (in Dutch). Het vrĳe volk : democratisch-socialistisch dagblad. 22 June 1972.
- "Veertien zeilers naar Barcelona". Limburgsch dagblad (in Dutch). 1 June 1992.
- "Zeilers aan alle kanten voorbijgevarer". De Telegraaf (in Dutch). 30 July 1992.
- "WAARDIG AFSCHEID VAN ZEILPLOEG". De Telegraaf (in Dutch). 4 April 1992.
- "Twentse surfster redt eer zeilvloot". Nieuwsblad van het Noorden (in Dutch). 3 April 1992.
- "Official Report of the Games of the XXV Olympiad Barcelona 1992, Volume I The Challenge: From the idea to the nomination" (PDF). Barcelonal: COOB'92 S.A. 1992. Archived from the original (PDF) on 15 August 2012.
- "Official Report of the Games of the XXV Olympiad Barcelona 1992, Volume II The Means: Objectives, resources and venues" (PDF). Barcelona: COOB'92 S.A. 1992. Archived from the original (PDF) on 8 August 2012.
- "Official Report of the Games of the XXV Olympiad Barcelona 1992, Volume III The Organisation: The preparation of the Games" (PDF). Barcelona: COOB'92 S.A. 1992. Archived from the original (PDF) on 8 August 2012.
- "Official Report of the Games of the XXV Olympiad Barcelona 1992, Volume IV The Games: Sixteen days in summer" (PDF). Barcelona. 1992. Archived from the original (PDF) on 15 July 2012.
- "Official Report of the Games of the XXV Olympiad Barcelona 1992, Volume V The Results" (PDF). Barcelona: COOB'92 S.A. 1992. Archived from the original (PDF) on 27 September 2007.
- "The Official Report of the Centennial Olympic Games, Volume I Planning and Organization" (PDF). Atlanta: Peachtree Publishers. 1997. Archived from the original (PDF) on 16 June 2012.
- "The Official Report of the Centennial Olympic Games, Volume II The Centennial Olympic Games" (PDF). Atlanta: Peachtree Publishers. 1997. Archived from the original (PDF) on 15 July 2012.
- "The Official Report of the Centennial Olympic Games, Volume III The Competition Results" (PDF). Atlanta: Peachtree Publishers. 1997. Archived from the original (PDF) on 16 July 2012.
