= Slotty Dawes =

British sailor

Personal information
- Nationality: British
- Born: 16 March 1904; Faversham, England
- Died: December 1985; Ashford, England

Sport
- Sport: Sailing

Slotty Dawes (16 March 1904 – December 1985) was a British sailor. He competed in the Flying Dutchman event at the 1960 Summer Olympics.
