= Ronald Blaker =

Kenyan sailor (born 1936)

Personal information
- Nationality: Kenyan
- Born: 15 January 1936 (age 89); Johannesburg, South Africa

Sport
- Sport: Sailing

Ronald Blaker (born 15 January 1936) is a Kenyan sailor. He competed in the Flying Dutchman event at the 1960 Summer Olympics.
