= Daniel Gouffier =

French sailor (1937–2025)

Personal information
- Full name: Daniel Gabriel Jean Gouffier
- Nationality: French
- Born: 4 November 1937; Nantes, France
- Died: 5 August 2023 (aged 85); Nantes, France

Sport
- Sport: Sailing

Daniel Gabriel Jean Gouffier (4 November 1937 – 5 August 2023) was a French sailor. He competed in the Flying Dutchman event at the 1960 Summer Olympics. Gouffier died on 5 August 2023, at the age of 85.
