= Bengt Waller =

Swedish sailor (1935–2021)

Personal information
- Nationality: Swedish
- Born: 12 August 1935; Gothenburg, Sweden
- Died: 21 November 2021 (aged 86)

Sport
- Sport: Sailing

Bengt Waller (12 August 1935 – 21 November 2021) was a Swedish sailor who competed in the Flying Dutchman event at the 1960 Summer Olympics.
