= VinyLoop =

VinyLoop is a proprietary physical plastic recycling process for polyvinyl chloride (PVC). It is based on dissolution in order to separate PVC from other materials or impurities.

== Background ==
A major factor of the recycling of polyvinyl chloride waste is the purity of the recycled material. In most composite materials, PVC is among several other materials, such as wood, metal, or textile. To make new products from the recycled PVC, it is necessary to separate it from other materials. Traditional recycling methods are not sufficient and expensive because this separation has to be done manually and product by product.

VinyLoop is a recycling process which separates PVC from other materials through a process of dissolution, filtration and separation of contamination. A solvent is used in a closed loop to elute PVC from the waste. This makes it possible to recycle composite structure PVC waste, which would normally be incinerated or put in a landfill site.

== Process ==
The process consists of the following steps:

1. Pre-treatment: waste plastics are cleaned, ground and mixed
2. Dissolution: a specific solvent is used to selectively dissolve the PVC compound in a closed loop
3. Filtration: impurities which have not been dissolved are removed through filtration—they are separated by type of material by filtration, centrifugation and decantation. After separation, the secondary materials are washed with pure solvent to dissolve all remaining PVC compounds
4. Precipitation of the regenerated PVC compound: the solution of PVC is recovered in a precipitation tank, where steam is injected to evaporate the solvent and precipitate the PVC. The PVC compound is separated in the form of aqueous effluent. and dried.
5. Drying: after recovering the excess water from the slurry, the wet PVC goes to a dryer.

Possible products made from recycled PVC are coatings for waterproofing membranes, pond foils, shoe soles, hoses, diaphragms tunnel, coated fabrics, and PVC sheets. It is an attempt to solve the recycling waste problem of PVC products.

== Ecological importance ==
VinyLoop-based recycled PVC's primary energy demand is 46 percent lower than conventional produced PVC. The global warming potential is 39 percent lower.

The VinyLoop process has been selected to recycle membranes of different temporary venues of the London Olympics 2012. Roofing covers of the Olympic Stadium, the Water Polo Arena, the London Aquatics Centre and the Royal Artillery Barracks will be deconstructed and a part will be recycled in the VinyLoop process.

== Closure ==
Since the process could not remove low molecular weight phthalate plasticizers during recycling, tightening EU regulations meant the recycling plant based in Ferrara, Italy has closed as of 28 June 2018.

== See also ==
- Plastic pressure pipe systems
- Plastic recycling
- Polyvinyl fluoride
- Polyvinylidene chloride
- Polyvinylidene fluoride
- Smart polymer
- Vinyl roof membrane
