= Gabriel Lopes (sailor) =

Portuguese sailor

Personal information
- Full name: Gabriel da Silva Lopes
- Nationality: Portuguese
- Born: 2 December 1931; Setúbal, Portugal

Sport
- Sport: Sailing

Gabriel Lopes (born 2 December 1931) is a Portuguese former sailor. He competed in the Flying Dutchman event at the 1960 Summer Olympics.
