= Stylianos Kyriakidis =

Greek sailor

Personal information
- Nationality: Greek
- Born: 15 February 1942 (age 83); Athens, Greece

Sport
- Sport: Sailing

Stylianos Kyriakidis (born 15 February 1942) is a Greek sailor. He competed in the Flying Dutchman event at the 1960 Summer Olympics.
