= Jean-Claude Cornu =

French sailor (1938–2023)

Personal information
- Nationality: French
- Born: 24 May 1938 Nantes, France
- Died: 25 November 2023 (aged 85)

Sport
- Sport: Sailing

Jean-Claude Cornu (French pronunciation: [ʒɑ̃klod kɔʁny]; 24 May 1938 – 25 November 2023) was a French sailor. He competed in the Flying Dutchman event at the 1960 Summer Olympics.

Cornu died on 25 November 2023, at the age of 85.
