= Gerard Lautenschutz =

Dutch sailor (1928–2022)

Personal information
- Full name: Gerardus "Gerard" Lautenschutz
- Nationality: Dutch
- Born: 27 November 1928 Amsterdam, Netherlands
- Died: 11 October 2022 (aged 93) Rozenburg, Netherlands
- Height: 1.88 m (6.2 ft)

Sailing career
- Sport: Sailing
- Class: Flying Dutchman
- Updated on 8 January 2014

Gerardus "Gerard" Lautenschutz (27 November 1928 – 11 October 2022) was a Dutch sailor who represented his country at the 1960 Summer Olympics in Naples. Lautenschutz, as crew on the Dutch Flying Dutchman Daisy (H102), took the 5th place with helmsman Ben Verhagen. After 5 races Lautenschutz needed to go home due to family circumstances. The last two races were crewed by Jaap Helder. Lautenschutz was born in Amsterdam.

== Sources ==
- "Gerard Lautenschutz Bio, Stats, and Results". Olympic Sports. Sports-Reference.com. Archived from the original on 2014-01-08.
- "NEDERLANDS OLYMPISCHE EQUIPE". De Tijd De Maasbode (in Dutch) (Day ed.). 1960-08-02.
- "Sleeswijk toch naar O.S." Nieuwsblad van het Noorden (in Dutch) (Day ed.). 1960-08-09.
- "Weer een goede race van Verhagen Jaap Helder ook aan bod?". Nieuwsblad van het Noorden (in Dutch) (Day ed.). 1960-09-02.
- "The Games of the XVII Olympiad Rome 1960, The Official Report of the Organizing Committee Volume One" (PDF). 1960. Archived from the original (PDF) on 2012-10-27.
- "The Games of the XVII Olympiad Rome 1960, The Official Report of the Organizing Committee Volume Two (a)" (PDF). 1960. Archived from the original (PDF) on 2011-05-23.
- "The Games of the XVII Olympiad Rome 1960, The Official Report of the Organizing Committee Volume Two (b)" (PDF). 1960. Archived from the original (PDF) on 2012-10-29.
