= Tony Bentley-Buckle =

Kenyan sailor (1921–2010)

Personal information
- Nationality: Kenyan
- Born: 13 August 1921 Knokke, Belgium
- Died: 24 May 2010 (aged 88) Brockenhurst, England

Sport
- Sport: Sailing

Tony Bentley-Buckle (13 August 1921 – 24 May 2010) was a Kenyan sailor. He competed in the Flying Dutchman event at the 1960 Summer Olympics.
