= Carl Auteried =

Austrian sailor

Personal information
- Nationality: Austrian
- Born: 14 December 1914; Vienna, Austria-Hungary
- Died: 1998 (aged 83–84)

Sport
- Sport: Sailing

Carl Auteried (14 December 1914 – 1998) was an Austrian sailor. He competed in the Flying Dutchman event at the 1960 Summer Olympics.
