= Leopold Kalesaran =

Indonesian sailor

Personal information
- Nationality: Indonesian
- Born: 19 September 1931; Salatiga, Dutch East Indies

Sport
- Sport: Sailing

Leopold Kalesaran (born 19 September 1931) is an Indonesian sailor. He competed in the Flying Dutchman event at the 1960 Summer Olympics.
