= Roy Ramsay (sailor) =

Bahamian sailor

George Leroy F. Ramsay (born 28 September 1912, date of death unknown) is a Bahamian former sailor who competed in the 1960 Summer Olympics, in the 1964 Summer Olympics, and in the 1968 Summer Olympics.
