= London Aquatics Centre =

Public aquatic sports facility in London, England

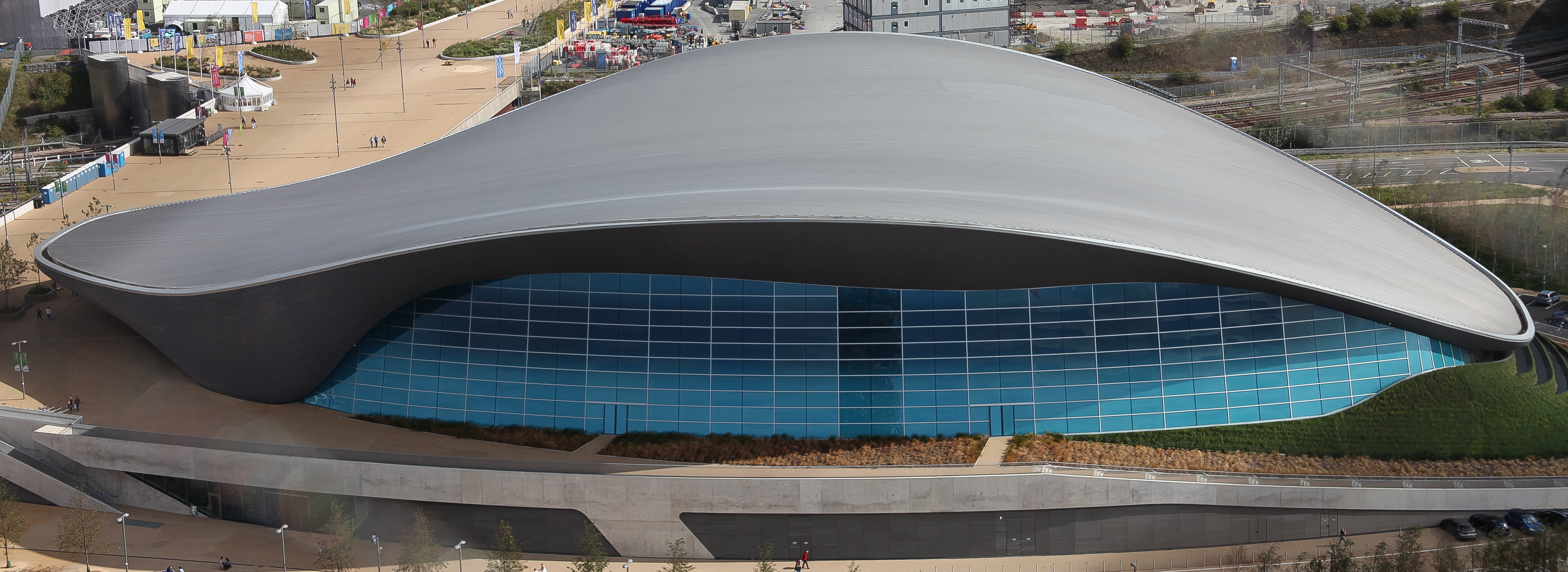
- The Aquatics Centre, in 2014
- Interactive map of London Aquatics Centre
- Location: Queen Elizabeth Olympic Park; E20; London Borough of Newham; United Kingdom
- Coordinates: 51.5402°N 0.0106°W
- Operator: Greenwich Leisure Limited (1st March 2014 - 29th February 2024); Everyone Active (1st March 2024 - Present)
- Capacity: 17,500 (2,500 post-Olympics)
- Public transit: Stratford; Stratford International

Construction
- Groundbreaking: July 2008
- Built: 27 July 2011
- Cost: £269 million
- Architect: Zaha Hadid Architects
- Structural engineer: Arup
- General contractor: Balfour Beatty

Tenants
- 2012 Summer Olympics; 2012 Summer Paralympics; 2016 European Aquatics Championships

The London Aquatics Centre is an indoor facility with two 50-metre (164-foot) swimming pools and a 25-metre (82-foot) diving pool in Queen Elizabeth Olympic Park in Stratford, London. The centre, designed by architect Zaha Hadid as one of the main venues of the 2012 Summer Olympics and Paralympics, was used for the swimming, diving and synchronised swimming events. After significant modification, the centre opened to the public in March 2014.

== Design ==
The centre was designed by Pritzker Prize-winning architect Zaha Hadid in 2004 before London won the bid for the 2012 Summer Olympics. It was built alongside the Water Polo Arena and opposite the Olympic Stadium on the opposite bank of the Waterworks River. The site is 45 metres (148 feet) high, 160 metres (520 feet) long, and 80 metres (260 feet) wide. The wave-like roof is stated to be 11,200 square feet (1,040 m^{2}), a reduction from the previously stated 35,000 square feet (3,300 m^{2}).

The complex has a 50-m competition pool, a 25-m competition diving pool and a 50-m warm-up pool. The 50-m pool is 3 metres deep, like the one in the Beijing National Aquatics Center. Its floor can be moved to reduce its depth. There are also moveable booms that allow its size to be changed. The diving pool has platform boards at heights of 3 m, 5 m, 7.5 m, and 10 m and three 3m springboards. For the television coverage of the Olympics, the pools were also equipped with innovative cameras in order to present the action from multiple angles.

Because the centre was designed before the Olympic bid was completed, the spectator wings were not part of the original design. They were later added to fit the estimated audience.

Jacques Rogge, IOC President, described the centre as a "masterpiece".

== Construction ==
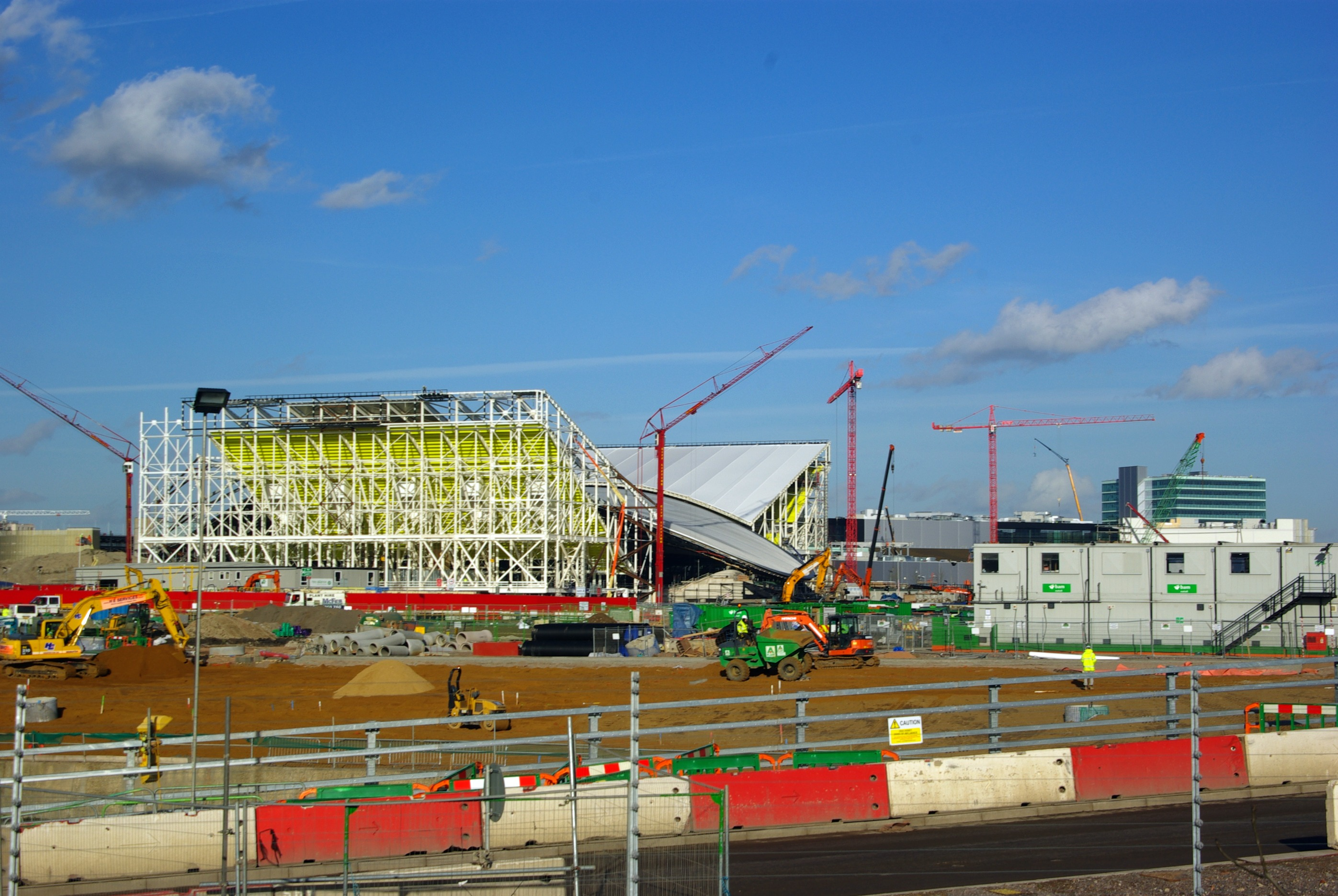
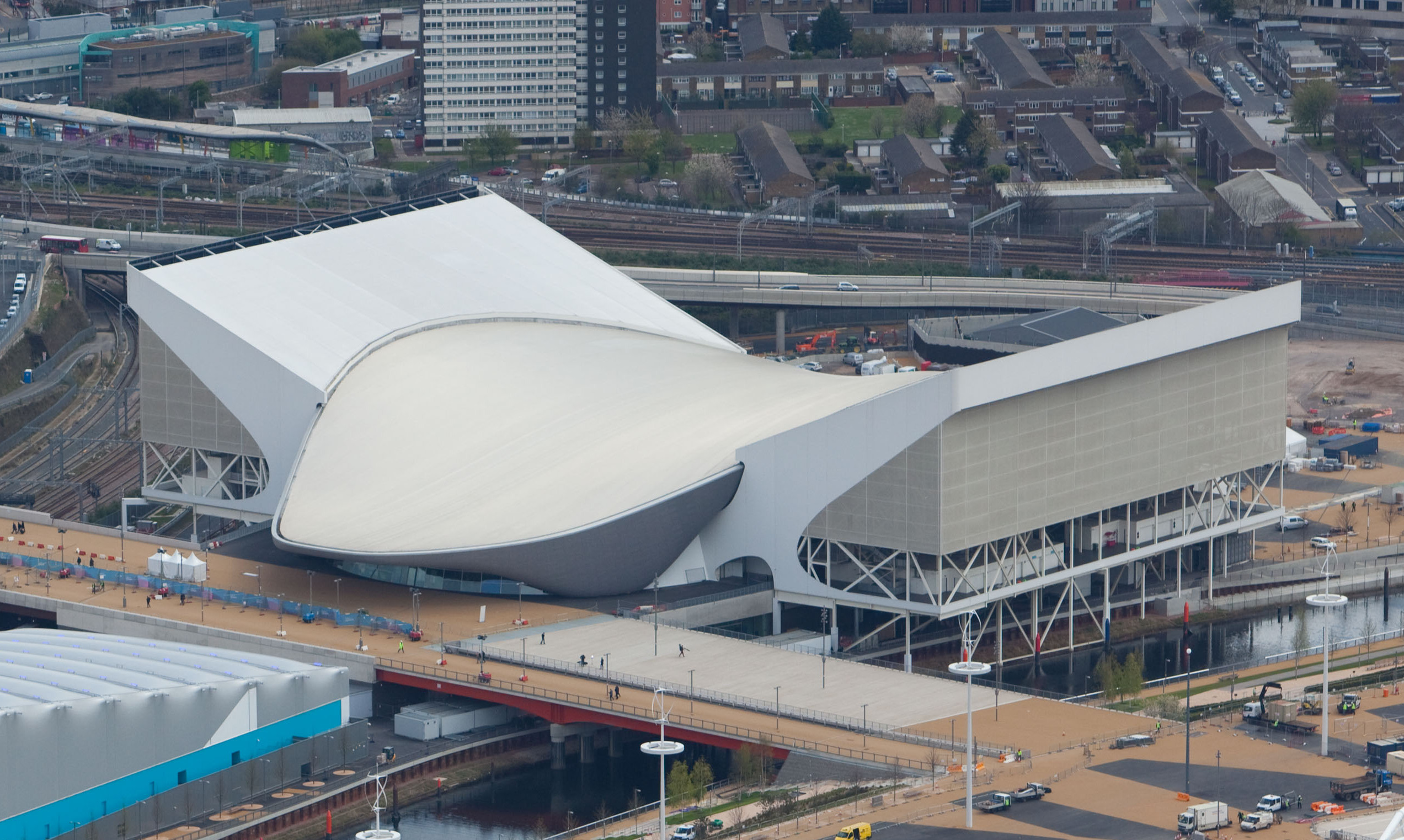
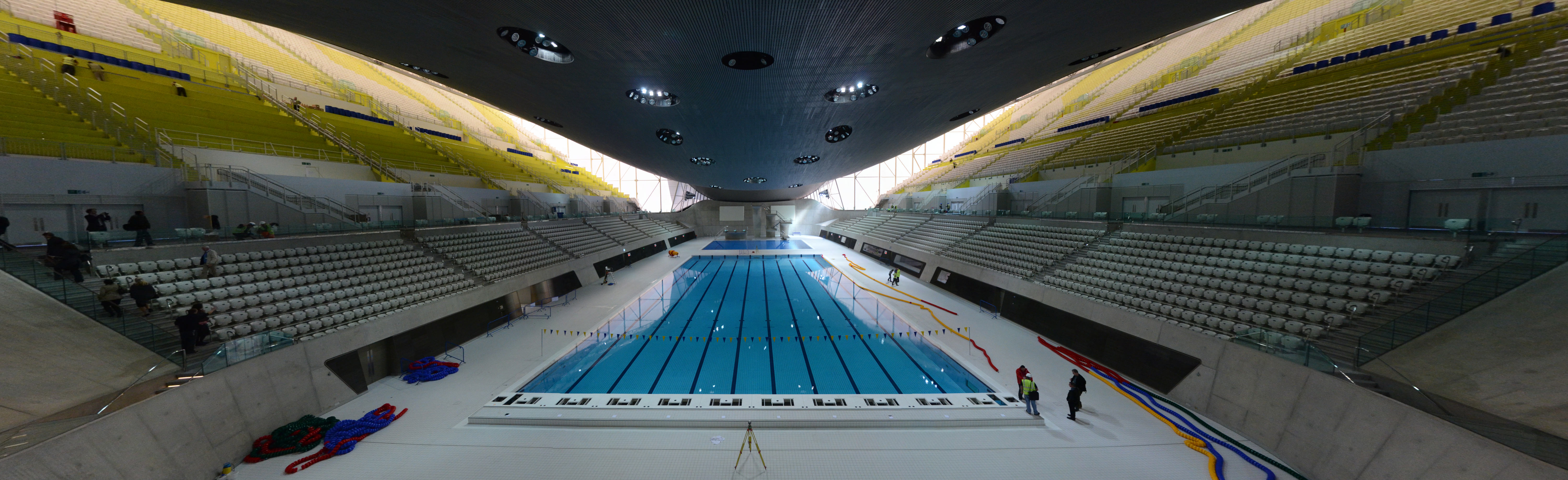
Construction of the aquatics centre and a Panorama of the interior during a London Prepares test event in April 2012.

On 1 December 2005, Hadid was instructed to revise her designs after a specification change led to a doubling of the £75-million estimated cost. The new plans were unveiled on 27 November 2006. Although the same general design was kept, with capacity for 17,500 spectators, the revised design was much smaller and was expected to cost much less than the previous estimate. However, subsequent cost increases were reported to Parliament in 2008.

The construction contract was awarded to Balfour Beatty in April 2008. At the same time, it was reported that the centre would cost about three times as much as originally estimated, totalling about £242 million. The cost increases were attributed to construction inflation and VAT increases, and also included the estimated cost of converting the facility for public use after the Olympic and Paralympic Games. The centre was completed in July 2011 at a final cost of £269 million.

By exposing the concrete finish rather than painting or cladding, the design demonstrates the precast-concrete skills provided by Peri. The precast floor terracing was manufactured by Bell & Webster Concrete in Lincolnshire, England. The terracing units were delivered and positioned to accelerate the speed of construction. The unique six-board diving platform is made from 462 tonnes of concrete. The aluminium roof covering was provided by Kalzip. The steel structure was built in cooperation with Rowecord Engineering, of Newport, Wales. The ceiling was built with 30,000 sections of Red Louro timber. The steel roof weighs 3,200 tonnes. The three pools hold around 10 million litres (2.2 million imperial gallons; 2.6 million US gallons) of water.

During the Games the venue had a capacity of 17,500. The two temporary "wings" have been removed, reducing the capacity to a regular 2,800 with an additional 1,000 seats available for major events. Of all the swimming venues built for the 2012 Summer Olympics, the Aquatics Centre is the only one that remains afterwards, albeit in a downsized form.

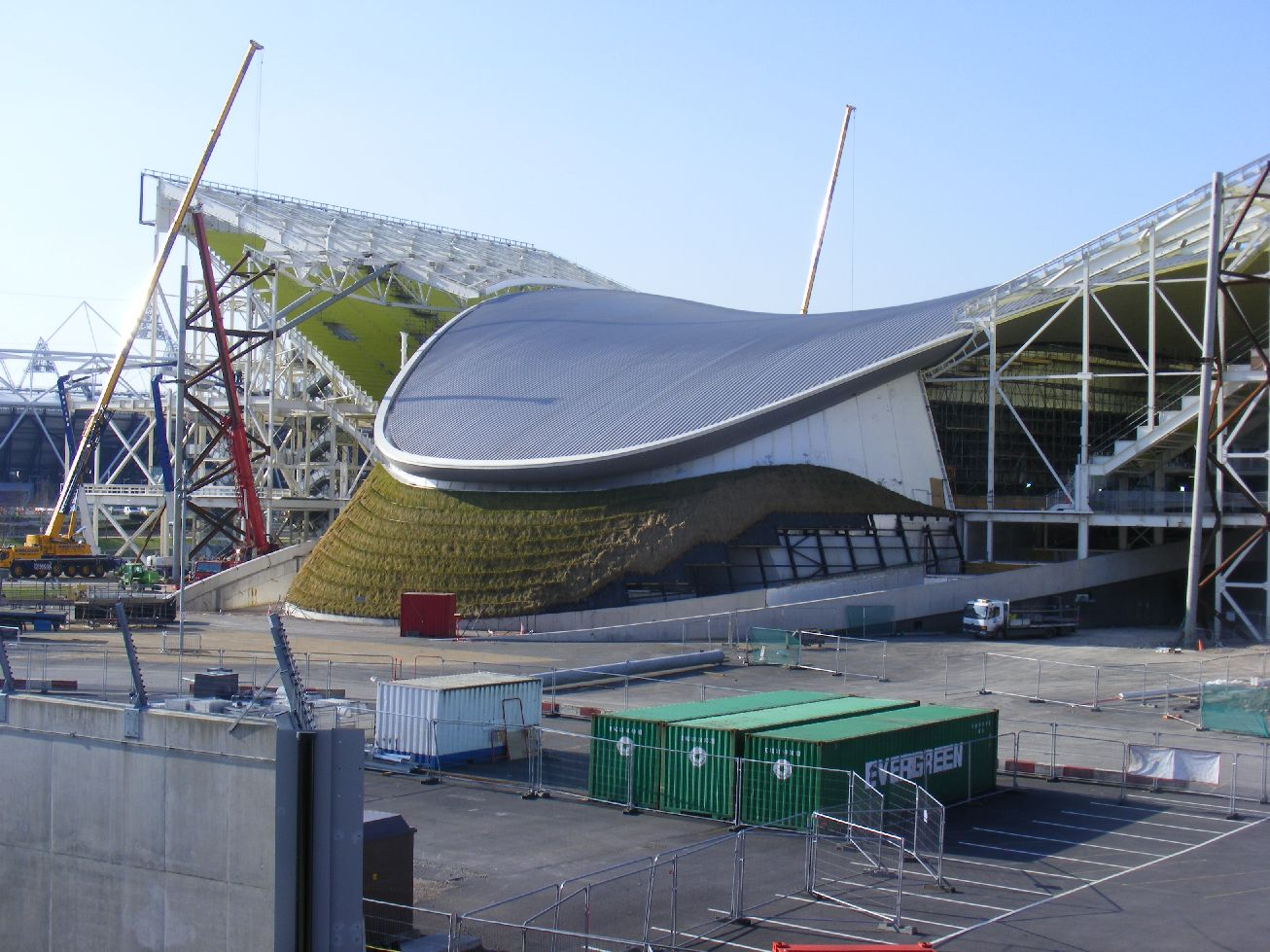
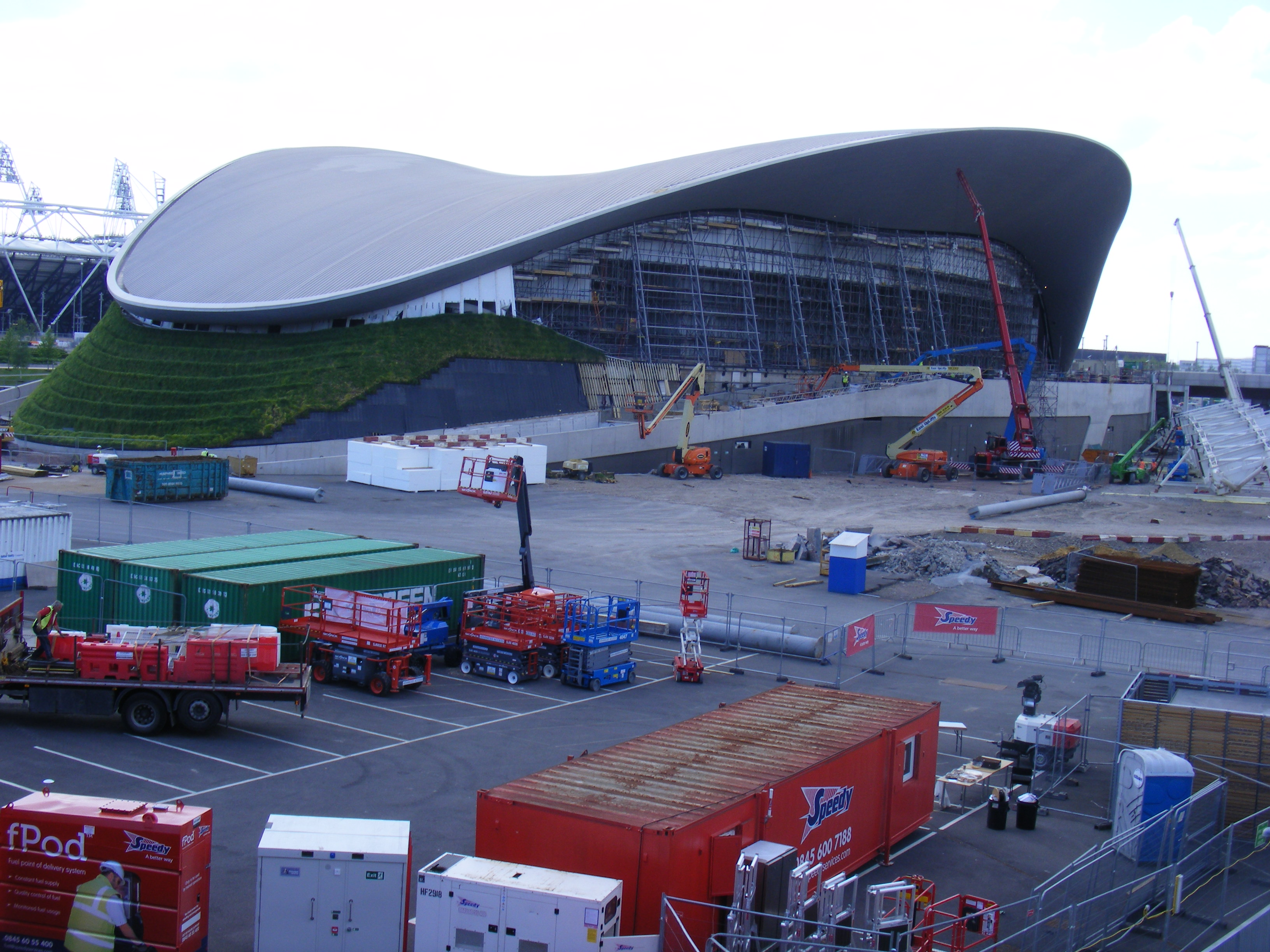
Removal of the wings of the centre.

After the Paralympic Games, the Aquatic Centre was deconstructed to reduce its space. The frame wings on either side of the central space were removed, unbolted, and sold. The PVC wrap that temporarily enclosed the space was also sold, while the seats and toilets were reused elsewhere. As certain parts of the building were no longer needed, they were recycled via Vinyloop. This allowed the standards of the Olympic Delivery Authority concerning environmental protection to be met.

== Legacy ==
Since the Olympic Games the venue has been modified, especially by removing the temporary seating that flanked the centre during the Games. It opened to the public on 1 March 2014. Admission prices are in line with local leisure centres.

The adjacent Water Polo Arena was dismantled after the Olympic Games, which left the Aquatics Centre as the sole swimming venue at the park. The centre hosted the 2014 FINA/NVC Diving World Series and the 2016 European Aquatics Championships. It continues to be used for swimming, water polo, synchronised swimming and diving training.

=== Gallery ===
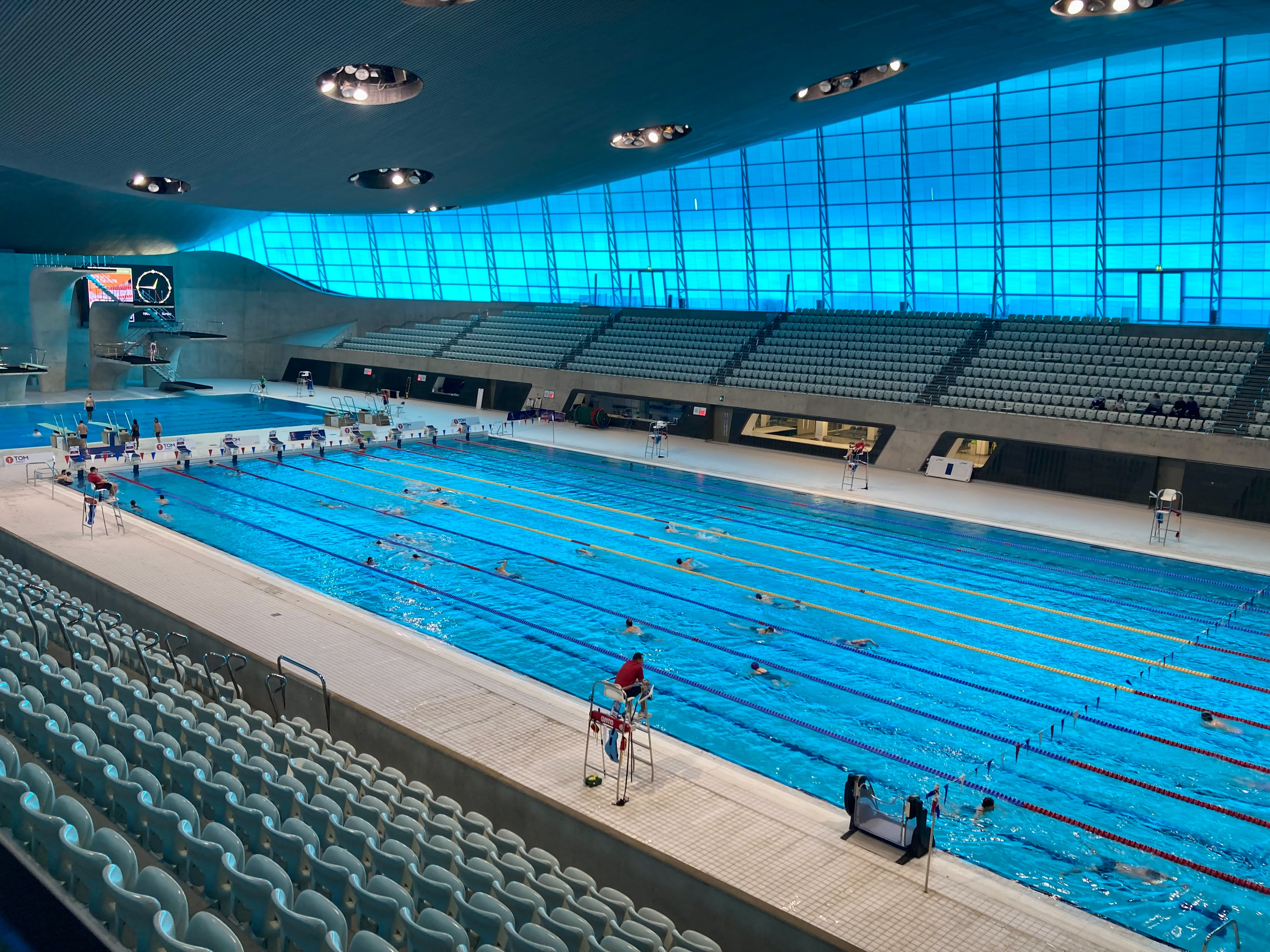
Interior view of The Aquatics Centre after the Olympics, without the temporary wings.

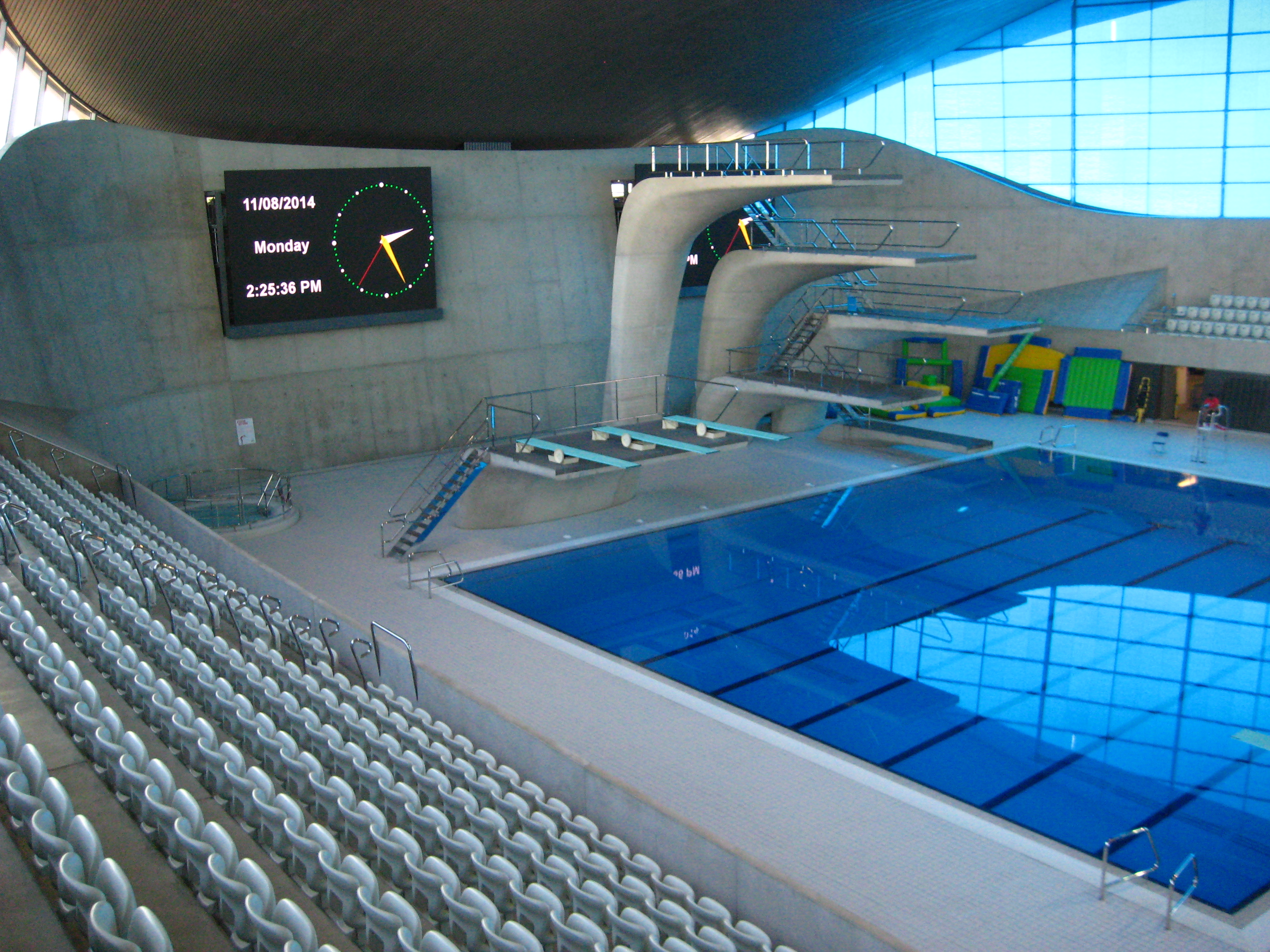
View of the diving tower

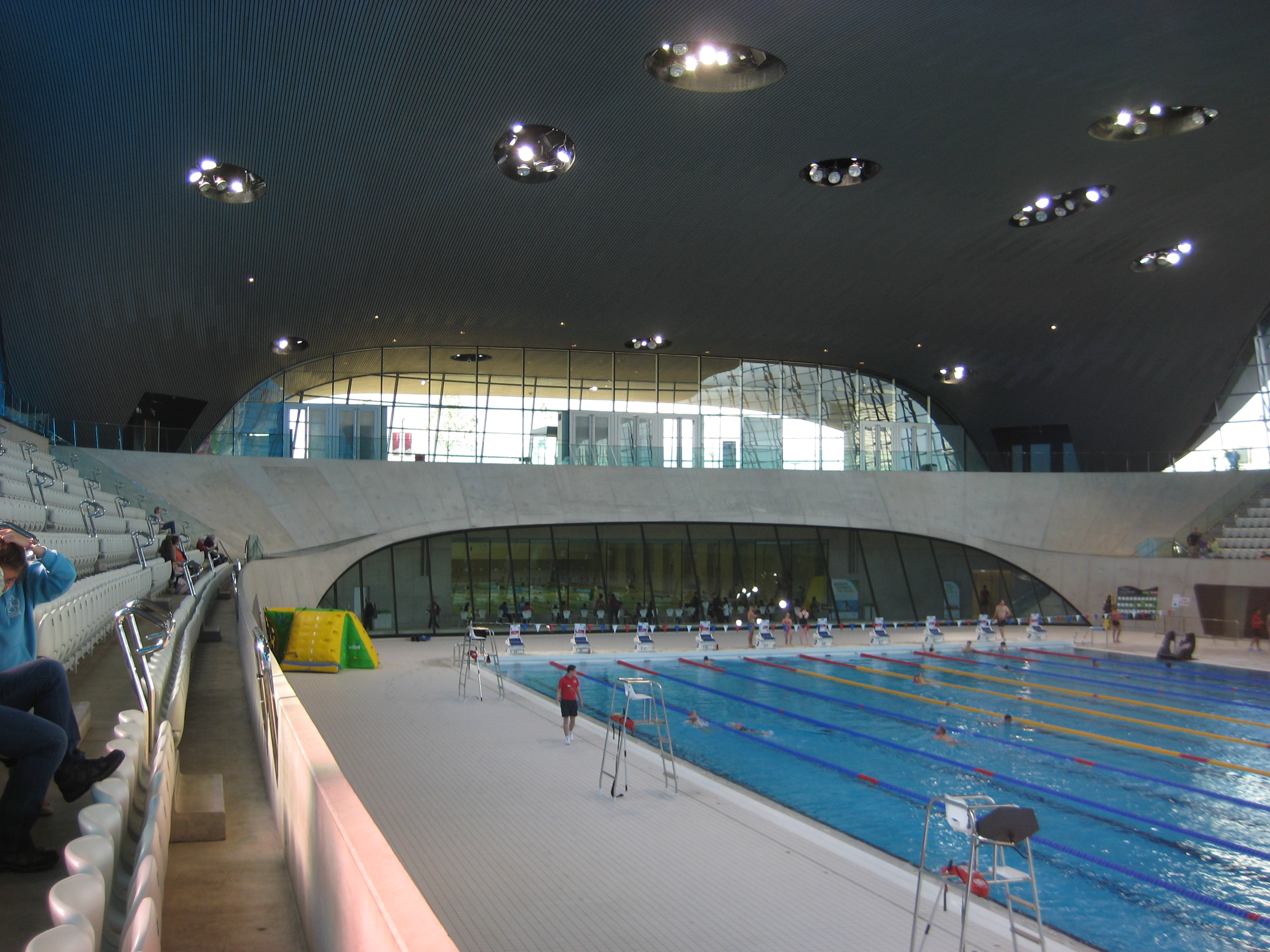
View of the starting blocks at the competition pool

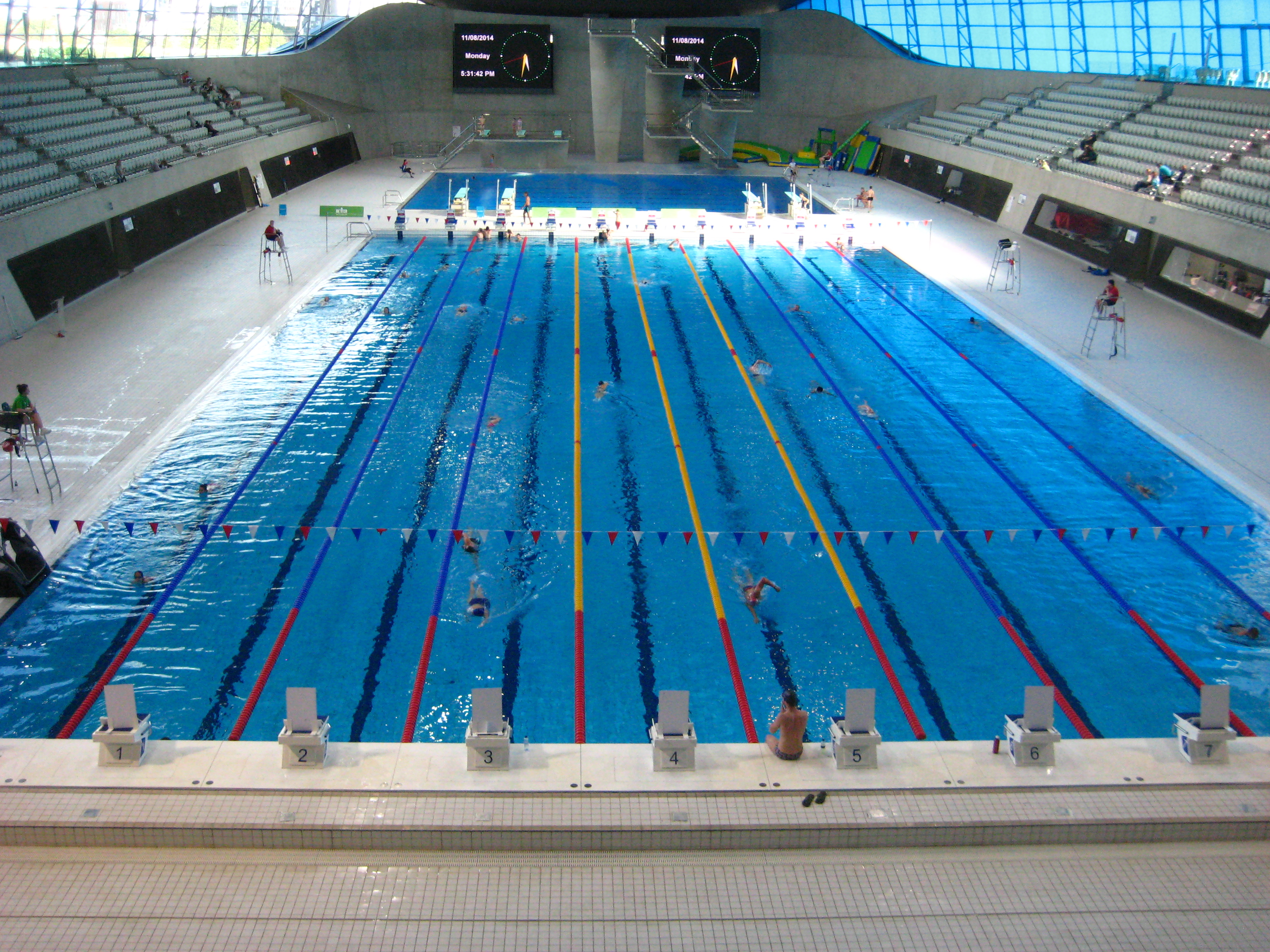
View of the competition and diving pools

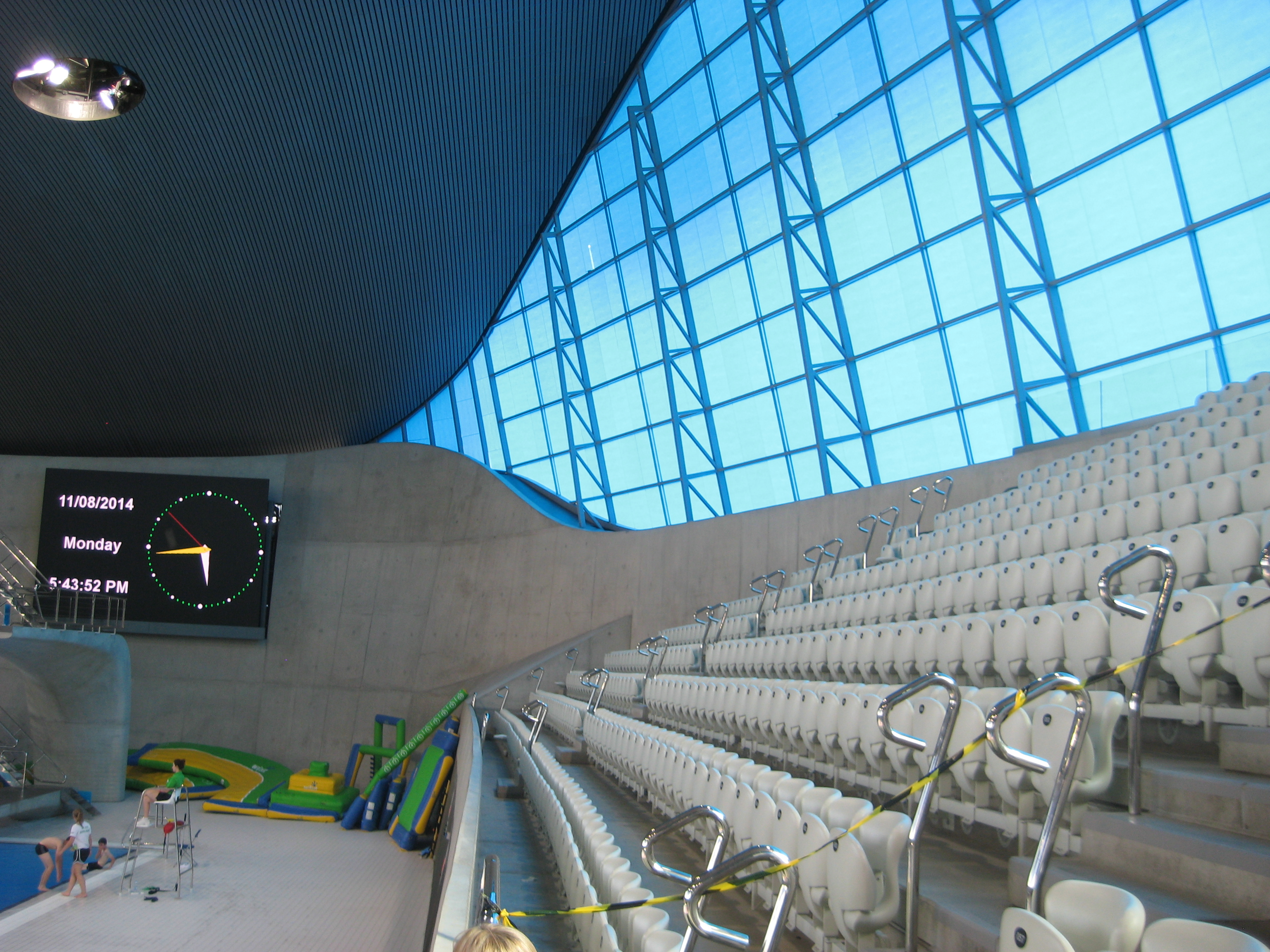
Permanent seating which remained after the Olympics.

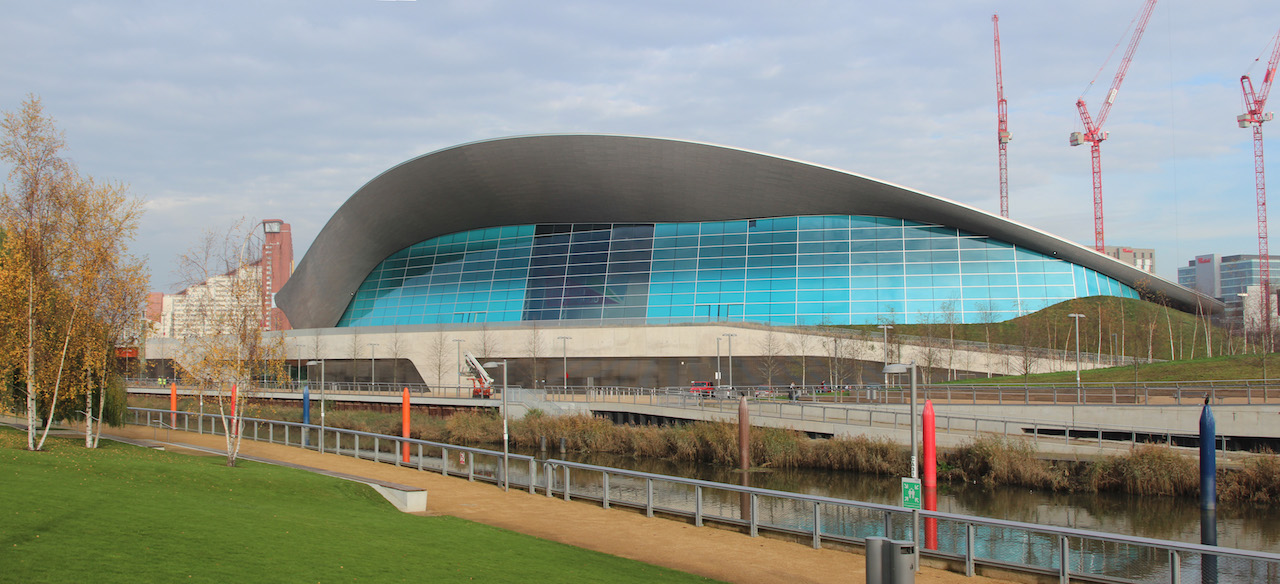
Outside the aquatics centre

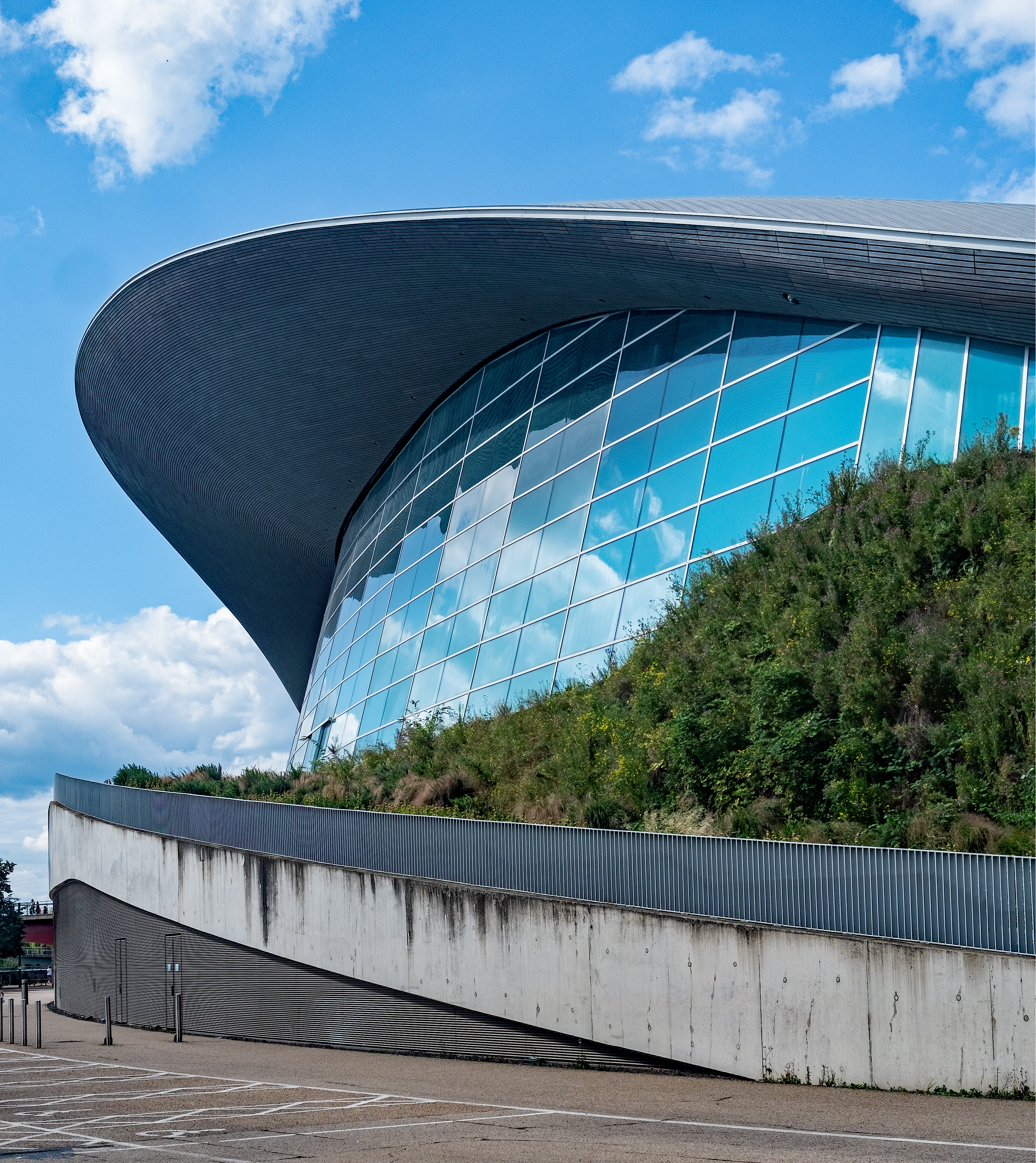
Vegetation planted outside of the aquatics center

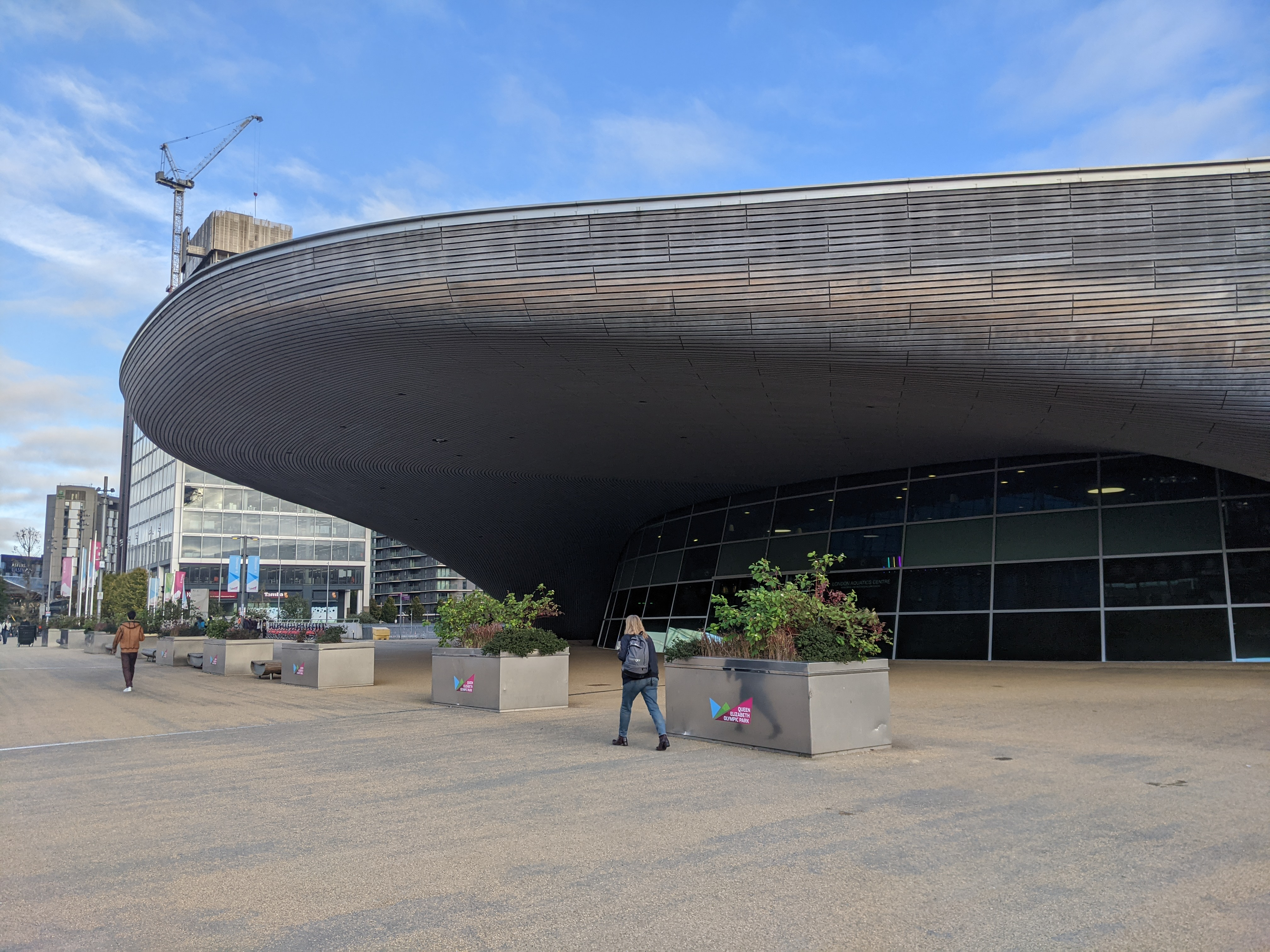
Pedestrian walkway by aquatics center entrance

== Comparable venues in England ==
- Crystal Palace National Sports Centre, London
- Ponds Forge, Sheffield
- John Charles Centre for Sport, Leeds
- Manchester Aquatics Centre
- Sunderland Aquatic Centre
- Plymouth Life Centre
