= André Maes =

Belgian sailor

Personal information
- Nationality: Belgian
- Born: 27 December 1917; Ghent, Belgium
- Died: 3 February 2002 (aged 84)

Sport
- Sport: Sailing

André Maes (27 December 1917 – 3 February 2002) was a Belgian sailor. He competed in the Flying Dutchman event at the 1960 Summer Olympics.
