= Godfrey Lightbourn =

Bahamian sailor

Personal information
- Nationality: Bahamian
- Born: 10 January 1930; Nassau, Bahamas
- Died: 10 October 2013 (aged 83); Nassau, Bahamas

Sport
- Sport: Sailing

Godfrey Lightbourn (10 January 1930 – 10 October 2013) was a Bahamian sailor. He competed in the Flying Dutchman event at the 1960 Summer Olympics.
