= Jacques De Brouwere =

Belgian sailor (1938–2018)

Personal information
- Nationality: Belgian
- Born: 13 January 1938; Saint-Denis, Mons, Belgium
- Died: 6 June 2018 (aged 80)

Sport
- Sport: Sailing

Jacques De Brouwere (13 January 1938 – 6 June 2018) was a Belgian sailor. He competed in the Flying Dutchman event at the 1960 Summer Olympics.
