= Aleksandr Shelkovnikov =

Soviet sailor

Personal information
- Nationality: Soviet
- Born: 30 July 1937; Moscow, Russia
- Died: 5 December 2011 (aged 74)

Sport
- Sport: Sailing

Aleksandr Shelkovnikov (30 July 1937 – 5 December 2011) was a Soviet sailor. He competed at the 1960 Summer Olympics and the 1964 Summer Olympics.
