= Keith Wilson (footballer) =

Australian rules footballer

Personal information
- Full name: Keith Wilson
- Born: 26 December 1935
- Died: 24 December 2000 (aged 64)
- Original team: Happy Valley Rovers
- Height: 173 cm (5 ft 8 in)
- Weight: 69 kg (152 lb)

Playing career^{1}
Years	Club	Games (Goals)
1956	North Melbourne	2 (0)
- ^{1} Playing statistics correct to the end of 1956.

Keith Wilson (26 December 1935 – 24 December 2000) was an Australian rules footballer who played with North Melbourne in the Victorian Football League (VFL).
