= Ving'hawe =

Ward in Mpwapwa, Dodoma, Tanzania

Ving'hawe Kata ya Ving'hawe
- Ward
- Location within Tanzania
- Coordinates: 6.36816°S 36.4933°E
- Country: Tanzania
- Region: Dodoma Region
- District: Mpwapwa district
- Ward: Ving'hawe

Population (2016)
  - Total: 12,712
- Time zone: UTC+3 (EAT)

Ving'hawe is an administrative ward in the Mpwapwa district of the Dodoma Region of Tanzania. In 2016 the Tanzania National Bureau of Statistics report there were 12,712 people in the ward, from 12,277 in 2012.
