= Jim Trimingham =

Jim Trimingham was Mayor of the City of Pleasanton, California from 1952 to 1955.

Trimingham ran the first fleet of school buses for the Amador Valley Joint Union High School District from 1932 to 1946.

Trimingham was a member of the Stanford student group Immortal 21 who retrieved the symbolic Stanford Axe from the University of California, Berkeley in 1930. This was in response to Berkeley students stealing the Stanford Axe in 1899. Don Kropp founded the Immortal 21 and "hatched an elaborate plan [to steal the axe] that proved winning". Students from the Immortal 21 blinded the custodian of the axe while it was in transit from a bank vault to an armored car. Trimingham drove the Stanford Axe back at speeds of up to 90 miles per hour (140 km/h) on circuitous back roads to return the trophy back to Stanford University.
