= Waterworks River =

River in London, England

Coordinates: 51.541774°N 0.016437°W

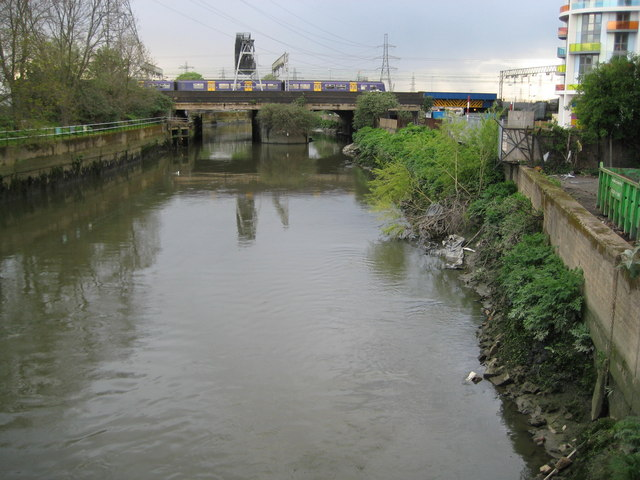
The river in 2008

Waterworks River is a river, at one time a tidal river, in the London Borough of Newham, one of the Bow Back Rivers that flow into the Bow Creek part of the River Lea, which in turn flows into the River Thames.

The river is an artificial channel, cut for the Stratford Waterworks (later purchased by the East London Waterworks Company) in 1743, from the Old River Lee channel (above Old Ford Lock), to supply a reservoir at Saynes Mill, Stratford. It was widened to 100 feet (30.5 m) in the 1930s, as part of a project to prevent flooding in Stratford. The channel is lined for large stretches with concrete slabs, though sections through the Queen Elizabeth Olympic Park have been landscaped to a more natural setting.

Whilst running through the park, which hosted the 2012 Summer Olympics, the river forms the border between the London Aquatics Centre on one bank, and the Olympic Stadium on the other. Steles (Waterworks) by artist Keith Wilson was the first artwork completed in the Olympic Park. It consists of thirty-five brightly coloured stele-like sculptures rising from the river.

== See also ==
- Rivers of the United Kingdom
- Rivers of London
