= Keith Wilson (cricketer) =

English cricketer (1894–1977)

Personal information
- Full name: Arthur Keith Wilson
- Born: 26 August 1894; Brighton, Sussex, England
- Died: 8 November 1977 (aged 83); Brighton, Sussex, England
- Batting: Right-handed
- Bowling: Leg break

Domestic team information
- Years: Team
- 1914–1934: Sussex

Career statistics
Competition	First-class
Matches	17
Runs scored	546
Batting average	19.50
100s/50s	1/3
Top score	134
Balls bowled	222
Wickets	3
Bowling average	73.66
5 wickets in innings	–
10 wickets in match	–
Best bowling	2/39
Catches/stumpings	4/–
- Source: Cricinfo, 18 May 2013

Arthur Keith Wilson (26 August 1894 – 8 November 1977) was an English cricketer. Wilson was a right-handed batsman who bowled leg break. He was born at Brighton, Sussex.

Wilson was educated at Brighton College, where he played cricket for the college team in 1911. His first-class debut for Sussex came against Northamptonshire in the 1914 County Championship, with him scoring an unbeaten 78 on debut. He made a further appearance in that season's County Championship against Gloucestershire, before the season was curtailed by the start of the First World War. Following the conclusion of the war, Wilson returned to playing first-class cricket for Sussex in the 1919 County Championship, making seven appearances in that season, with the season including his only first-class century with a score of 134 against Northamptonshire. He played twice for Sussex in the 1920 County Championship against Warwickshire and Middlesex, as well as playing a first-class match for the Gentlemen of the South against the Players of the South. His next first-class appearances for Sussex came in two university matches in 1923 against Oxford University and Cambridge University, before making two further appearances for the county in the 1925 County Championship against Hampshire and Somerset. Following a nine-year absence from first-class cricket, Wilson played one final first-class match for Sussex in the 1934 County Championship against Kent, scoring 69 in his final match.

Described in his Wisden obituary as a "good bat and an especially skilful cutter", Wilson scored 546 runs at an average of 19.50, with three half centuries and a single aforementioned century. Additionally described in Wisden as having taken "hundreds of wickets in minor cricket with slow flighted leg-breaks", Wilson was less successful in first-class cricket, bowling 37 overs and taking two wickets for Sussex and one for the Gentlemen of the South, at an overall bowling average of 73.66. For a time Wilson was later the Chairman of Sussex County Cricket Club, while during World War II he was credited with keeping cricket going at the County Ground. He died at the town of his birth on 8 November 1977.
