= Keith Wilson (artist) =

English artist (born 1965)

- Born: Birmingham, United Kingdom
- Education: Ruskin School of Art at Oxford University (BFA), Slade School of Art, University College London
- Known for: Sculpture, installation art, conceptual art, arts administration
- Notable work: Puddle, Steles (Waterworks), Sign for Art (Stelae 2014), Park Hill Plinths
- Website: keithwilsonstudio.com

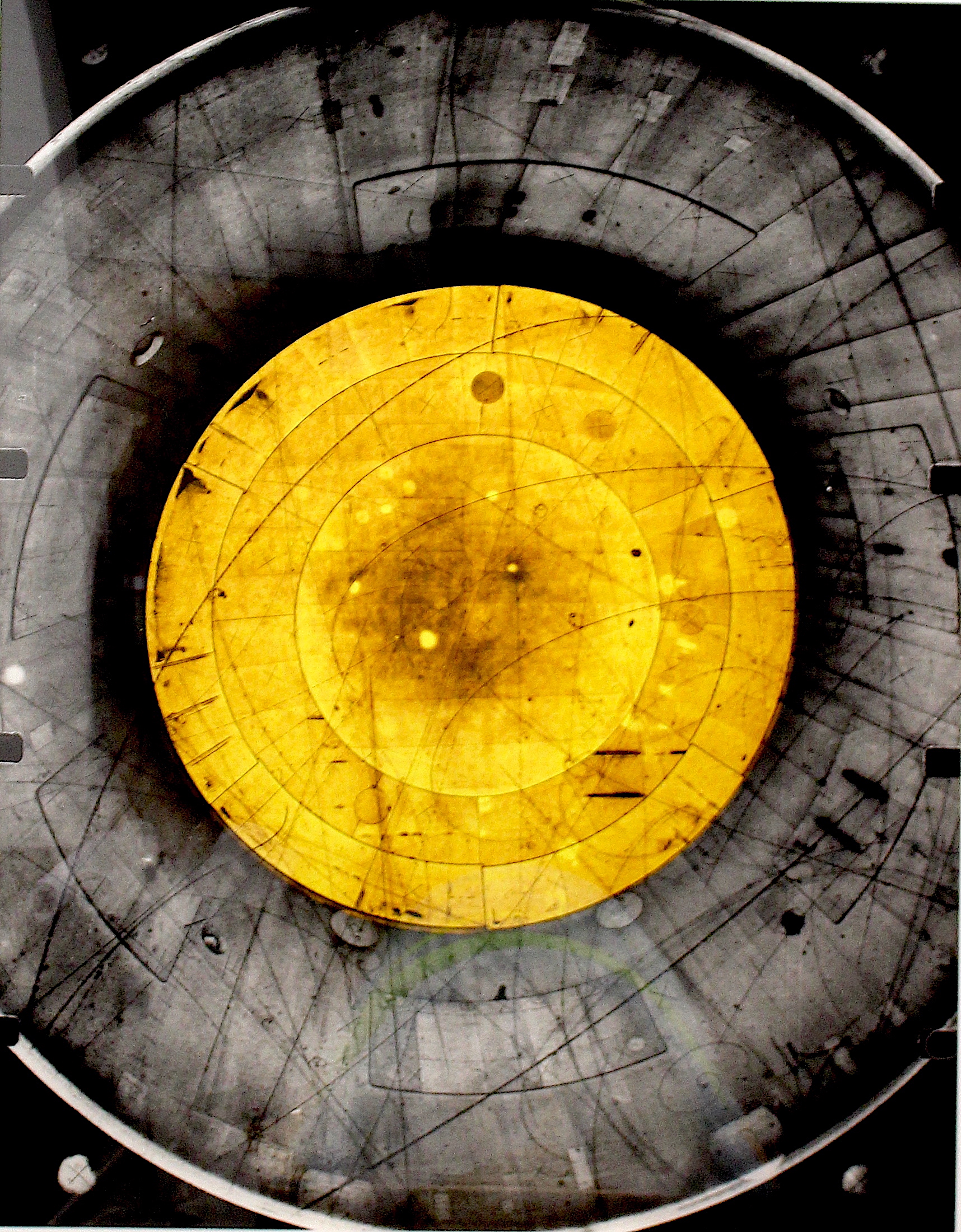

Keith Wilson is an artist, curator, educator, and cultural producer whose work spans sculpture, printmaking, participatory installation, and international exhibition making. Wilson received international notoriety in the late 1990s for his Puddle sculpture, and subsequently for Steles (Waterworks) sculptural installation, commissioned for the 2012 London Olympics, as well as for co-curating the exhibition Modern British Sculpture at the Royal Academy of Arts.

== Biography ==
Born in Birmingham, UK in 1965, Wilson studied art at the Ruskin School of Art at Oxford University from 1985 to 1988, and received his MFA from the Slade School of Art, University College London in 1990. Wilson won a Boise Travel Award in 1990 and a LAB Individual Artist Award in 1994. From 2017 to 2022, Wilson served as the director of the Center for the Humanities at the City University of New York Graduate Center, where he oversaw numerous cultural programs, including an international collaboration with Wellcome Trust. Wilson is a research professor in sculpture at Sheffield Hallam University, in Sheffield, UK.

== Artwork and curatorial projects ==
Wilson's public art projects include landscape-scaled abstract sculptures, which are a contemporary interpretation of the ancient steles form of monument. In 2012, Wilson was commissioned to create Steles (Waterworks) for the Queen Elizabeth Olympic Park on the occasion of the 2012 Summer Olympics in London. The artwork consists of thirty-five chromatic steles along the WaterWorks River. Wilson stated that "These sculptures stand ready to serve old functions in a new way. They connect the parkland with the river, the canal and by extension the wider world. They provide a sense of place and occasion, anchoring memories of many a good day out. These colourful totems will help create a distinctive identity for this newest and boldest of London parks." Wilson's other notable steles include Sign for Art (Stelae 2014) on the campus of the University of Leeds, and Park Hill Plinths located in the Park Hill Estates housing development in Sheffield, United Kingdom.

Wilson's curatorial projects include the exhibition Modern British Sculpture, which he co-curated with Penelope Curtis at the Royal Academy in 2011. The exhibition featured a selection of mainly abstract and conceptual sculpture from the twentieth and twenty-first centuries, and placed a focus on sculpture's long history of doing public work. In 2010, Wilson produced Things, an exhibition that opened with an empty museum collection, displaying objects contributed by members of the public through the period of exhibition. The exhibition was a collaboration with Wellcome Collection, and was their first public material gathering project. Things was first exhibited in 2010 at the Wellcome Collection, and re-imagined for the exhibition Calendar at the MAC Belfast in 2016. Things was the impetus for Wilson's next curatorial endeavor titled, The Object Library, which he developed while directing the Center for the Humanities at the City University of New York Graduate Center. The Object Library consisted of a collection of community-donated cultural items that Wilson notes, “point to other ways we can learn about the world.” The installation was located on the first floor of Mina Rees Library at The Graduate Center, CUNY from 2017 through 2020, where objects took the place of books.

== Museum and public collections ==
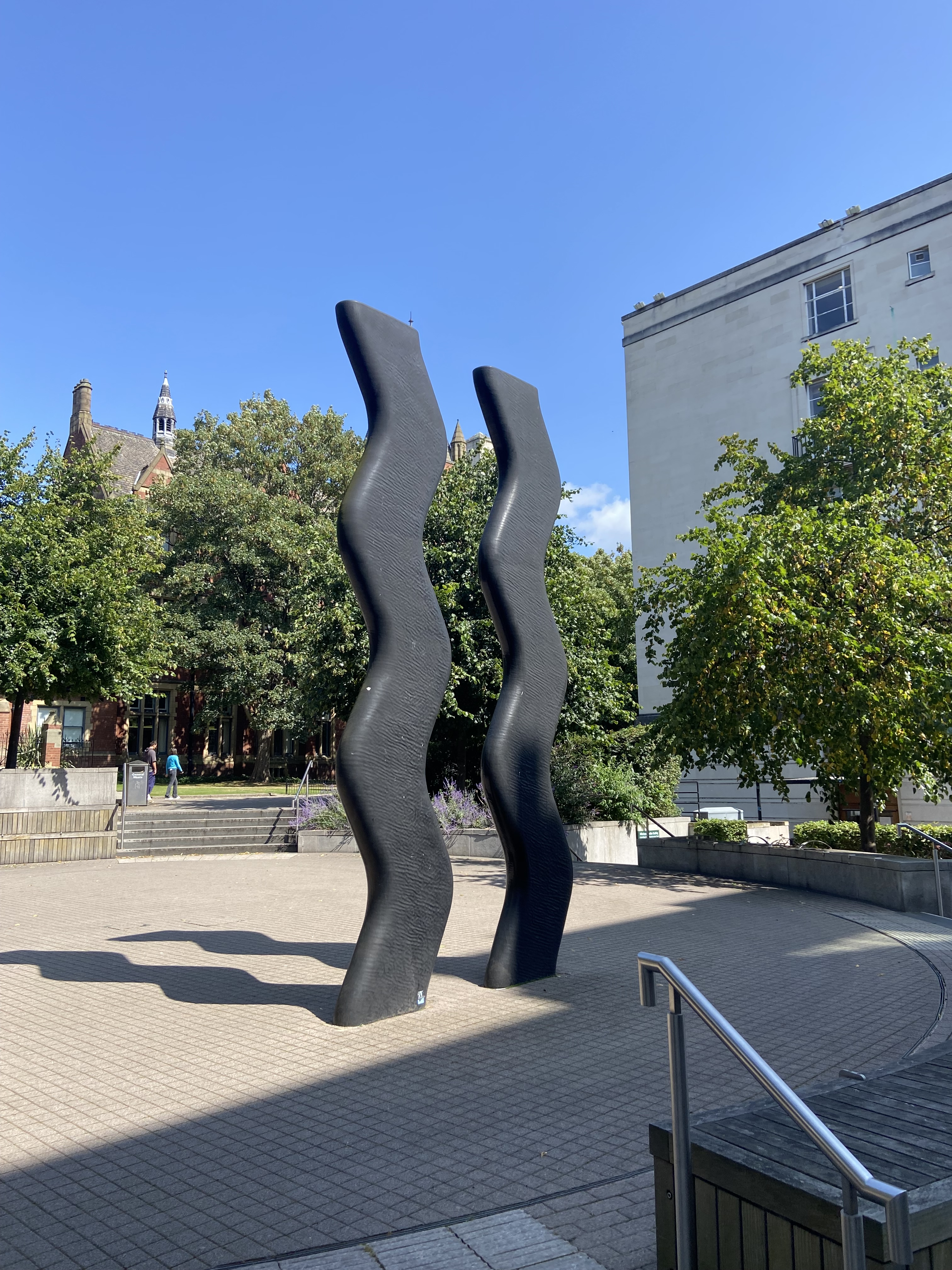
Keith Wilson's sculpture 'Sign for Art' on the University of Leeds campus

Wilson's abstract steles are permanently installed in several locations in the United Kingdom. Steles (Waterworks) is situated along the waterway that runs through the central section of Queen Elizabeth Olympic Park. His 2014 stele, Sign for Art (Stelae 2014), is publicly displayed in the center of Beech Grove Plaza on the campus of the University of Leeds. Sign for Art (Stelae 2014) is made from black polyurethane elastomer and references Wilson's experiences teaching art to visually and hearing impaired adults in the 1980s. The sculpture's two squiggly forms reference Wilson's tactile form of teaching. He initially ‘drew’ the two spaced lines across a student's forehead to signify a brushstroke. Wilson recalls that “this modification of the British Sign Language, presumably derived from the making of a brushstroke, struck home and stayed with me.”

== Publications ==
Wilson and Penelope Curtis co-edited and authored Modern British Sculpture, published in 2011 by Royal Academy Books.
