= Keith Wilson (shearer) =

Keith Wilson is a New Zealand sheep shearer. He holds the unofficial world record for shearing 871 sheep in one day in December 1999.

Prior to the 9 hour strongwool lamb record attempt by Rodney Sutton (839 lambs in 9 hours) in 2000, Wilson shore 851 unprepared lambs. Wilson was quoted as saying "I wanted to show Rodney that it could be done".

In a 24-hour shearing marathon, New Zealand's Alan MacDonald and Wilson machine-sheared 2,220 sheep at Warkworth, Auckland Province, New Zealand. The "Shearathon" commenced at 1 pm on 25 June 1988 and concluded at 1 pm on 26 June 1988.

Wilson & Paul Kemp held the 2 stand strongwool lamb record, set in 1981. The pair shore 1513 lambs in 9 hours at Tikorangi Station, Portland, New Zealand. As a young shearer, Wilson once shore 176 strongwool ewes in 2 hours.
