= DeForest Wheeler Trimingham =

Bermudian sailor

Personal information
- Nationality: Bermudian
- Born: 23 December 1919; Paget, Bermuda
- Died: 30 March 2007 (aged 87); Paget, Bermuda

Sport
- Sport: Sailing

DeForest Wheeler Trimingham (23 December 1919 – 30 March 2007) was a Bermudian sailor. He competed in the Flying Dutchman event at the 1960 Summer Olympics.
