= Keith Wilson (sailor) =

Canadian sailor

Personal information
- Born: 26 November 1937 (age 88) Montreal, Quebec, Canada

Sport
- Sport: Sailing

Keith Wilson (born 26 November 1937) is a Canadian sailor. He competed in the Flying Dutchman event at the 1960 Summer Olympics.
