= Christian Vinge =

Swedish sailor

Personal information
- Nationality: Swedish
- Born: 4 November 1935 (age 89); Askim, Sweden

Sport
- Sport: Sailing

Christian Vinge (born 4 November 1935) is a Swedish sailor. He competed in the Flying Dutchman event at the 1960 Summer Olympics.
