= Antoine Sader =

Lebanese sailor

Personal information
- Nationality: Lebanese
- Born: 24 August 1929 Dekouaneh, Lebanon

Sport
- Sport: Sailing

Antoine Sader (born 24 August 1929) was a Lebanese sailor. He competed in the Flying Dutchman event at the 1960 Summer Olympics.
