= Charles Hughes (football manager) =

English football coach and author (1933–2024)

- Born: 28 July 1933; Clitheroe, Lancashire, England
- Died: 13 August 2024 (aged 91)
- Known for: Director of coaching for The Football Association

Charles Hughes (28 July 1933 – 13 August 2024) was an English football coach and author who was the director of coaching for the Football Association. He authored the FA's official coaching manual and was an early developer of long ball tactics.

== Coaching ==
Hughes began his coaching career with the England national amateur football team and Great Britain and Northern Ireland Olympic football team between 1964 and 1974 winning 48 matches out of 77. He began football coaching in 1964 by being assistant coach to Allen Wade, and used the experience he gained from studying for a degree in physical education at Loughborough University. Hughes would later become the Director of Coaching for The Football Association and publish his book, The Winning Formula, which would be the basis of how English football would be played and coached for several decades.

== Tactics ==
Hughes presented his ideas in the magazine Match Analysis and concluded most goals were scored from three passes or fewer, therefore it was important to get the ball quickly forward as soon as possible. He based this analysis on over one hundred games at all levels, including games involving Liverpool and the Brazil national team, as well as many England youth games. His ideals were developed from those previously developed by World War II Wing Commander Charles Reep. From his statistical analysis, Hughes emphasised the importance of particular areas of the field from where goals were most often scored. He called these areas the 'POMO' – Positions of Maximum Opportunity – and said that players would score if the ball was played into the 'POMO' enough times. He stressed the importance of set plays and crosses into the penalty area.

== Death ==
Hughes died on 13 August 2024, at the age of 91.

== Legacy and criticism ==
Many coaches and managers in England advocated his long-ball philosophy but some critics have derided his philosophy for encouraging a generation of players who lack basic technical skills and understanding of different tactical playing strategies.

== Work ==
The Official FA Guide to Basic Team Coaching ISBN 0-340-81600-7
