= Charles Reep =

English football analyst (1904–2002)

- Born: Thorold Charles Reep; 22 September 1904; Cornwall, England
- Died: 3 February 2002 (aged 97)
- Known for: Founder of the long ball game

Thorold Charles Reep (22 September 1904 – 3 February 2002) was an English analyst credited with creating the long ball game, which has characterised English football.

== Biography ==
Reep trained as an accountant after leaving Devonport High School in 1923. He won the first prize in an entrance competition for the newly formed Accountancy Division of the Royal Air Force in 1928. He achieved the rank of Wing Commander in the Royal Air Force and retired from the service in 1955.

Reep attended a series of lectures given by Arsenal right-half Charlie Jones in 1933 and became fascinated by manager Herbert Chapman's style of functional wingers and rapidly moving the ball forwards. Posted to Germany at the end of World War II, Reep returned to England in 1947 and was disappointed to find that with the exception of the W–M formation, none of Chapman's ideas had been adopted. Frustrated by what he considered slow play and marginalised wingers, he lost patience during a Swindon Town match at The County Ground in March 1950. After watching the home side fruitlessly attack in the first half, he decided to record notes during the second half. He surmised that with an average of two goals scored per game, only a small improvement was needed in the chance conversion rate to score three goals per game and all but guarantee promotion.

His analysis caught the attention of Brentford manager Jackie Gibbons, and from February 1951 until the end of the season, he was employed part-time as an adviser. With 14 games to play, the club was in danger of relegation but after his arrival their goals-to-games ratio improved from 1.5 to 3 and they took 20 out of a possible 28 points, easily avoiding relegation.

In the 1950s, Reep shared his analyses in the News Chronicle. He concluded that most goals were scored from fewer than three passes: therefore he proposed it was important to get the ball forward as soon as possible. The quicker the ball was played to goal with the fewest passes the more goals would be scored. His theory became known as the long ball. Reep worked with Brentford in the 1950–51 season. Reep's analyses published in the News Chronicle attracted Stan Cullis' interest at Wolverhampton Wanderers.

Reep and Bernard Benjamin published a statistical analysis of patterns of play in football from 1953 to 1967 in the Journal of the Royal Statistical Society in 1968. Their paper analysed two sets of game data. The first set comprised 101 games (42 First Division matches in the 1957–1958 season; 12 First Division matches in the 1961–1962 season; 36 Miscellaneous matches in the 1965–1966 season; and 11 World Cup matches from the 1966 tournament). Data from the 1957–1958 season were derived from games involving Sheffield Wednesday. Data from the 1961–1962 season were derived from games involving Arsenal. The second set of data comprised an additional 477 games. Data from both sets of game data (578 games) were used in the paper to analyse passing move distributions. A subsequent paper re-analysed some of the passing data. Reep and Benjamin found that 5% of all moves consisted of four passes or more and only 1% of six passes or more. Reep concluded that possession football was therefore undesirable.

His ideas were the foundation of the Norway national football team playing style under the management of Egil Olsen in the 1990s.

=== Criticism ===
The writer Jonathan Wilson has strongly criticised Reep's work. Wilson said that Reep's analysis shows that 91.5% of moves in the games he studied had three passes or fewer and that logically, this would mean that 91.5% of all goals should come from moves with three passes or fewer. However, Reep's analysis found that fewer than 80% of goals came from moves with three passes or fewer. Therefore, Reep's own work shows that moves with three passes or fewer are less effective than those with four or more. "And these figures do not even take into account the goals scored when long chains of passes have led to a dead-ball or a breakdown or even the fact that a side holding possession and making their opponents chase is likely to tire less quickly, and so will be able to pick off exhausted opponents late on. It is, frankly, horrifying that a philosophy founded on such a basic misinterpretation of figures could have been allowed to become a cornerstone of English coaching. Anti-intellectualism is one thing, but faith in wrong-headed pseudo-intellectualism is far worse."

Wilson also stated that in World Cup matches Reep observed, the percentage of all moves comprising seven or more passes was roughly double what it was for English league games in the preceding season. "If long, direct play really were superior, surely there would be more of it the higher the level?... Tactics must be conditioned by circumstances and the players available. Reep's apologists misinterpret the figures, but even if they had not, his method is so general as to be all but meaningless. Why would it follow that an approach suited to a Third Division match in Rotherham in December would be equally applicable to a World Cup game in Guadalajara in July?"

Richard Pollard addressed these criticisms in 2019, arguing that "passing sequence data cannot be used to give information about the relative merits of direct and possession play". His paper provided an alternative reading of Reep's work and challenged accepted wisdom about Reep.

== See also ==
- Association football
- Charles Hughes (football manager)
- Long ball
