= Flo pass =

Association football tactic

The Flo Pass (Norwegian: Flo-pasningen) is a tactic used in association football, associated with the Norway national team in the early to mid-1990s. In a 4–5–1 formation, the full back hits a very long cross-field pass forward to a player on the opposite flank (sometimes called a wide target man), who would head the ball to either one of the central midfielders or to the striker.

== Origin ==
In the original move, employed by the Norway national team, the move would be started by Stig Inge Bjørnebye, and end with Jostein Flo (after whom the tactic derives its name). Flo, at 1.92m (6 ft 4in), was a natural centre forward with his physicality and height. When playing on the right flank, he could exploit his aerial ability against the full backs. Norwegian head coach Egil "Drillo" Olsen, who was the Norway national team coach between 1990–98 and 2009–13, has been credited and strongly identified with this tactic.

The Flo pass was successfully deployed for the first time in February 1993, in a 1–1 friendly draw with Portugal. On this occasion Pål Lydersen – not Bjørnebye – launched the ball to Flo, leading to Gøran Sørloth scoring Norway's goal.

The purpose of the Flo pass is to exploit the fact that the two players with best heading and aerial abilities in a back four are usually playing as centre backs. Jostein Flo was a threat in the air and when he moved out towards the right wing he only had to face the left back, who was usually weaker in the air than the central defenders. This increased the possibility of winning the ball, and the side was able to build up the attack from here, preferably before the opposing team have the opportunity to re-organize their defence.

Another advantage with this kind of play is that a technically limited football nation such as Norway, with only about 5 million people and much snow in winter time limiting the possibilities to practice, can play to their strengths rather than their weaknesses. This moves the ball very quickly, and is also able to surprise the opponent in a counterattack. This kind of tactical play sent Norway, traditionally a weak football nation, to the runner-up spot at the FIFA ranking in 1997, second only to FIFA World Cup winner Brazil.
