= Forward (association football) =

Attacking player position in association football

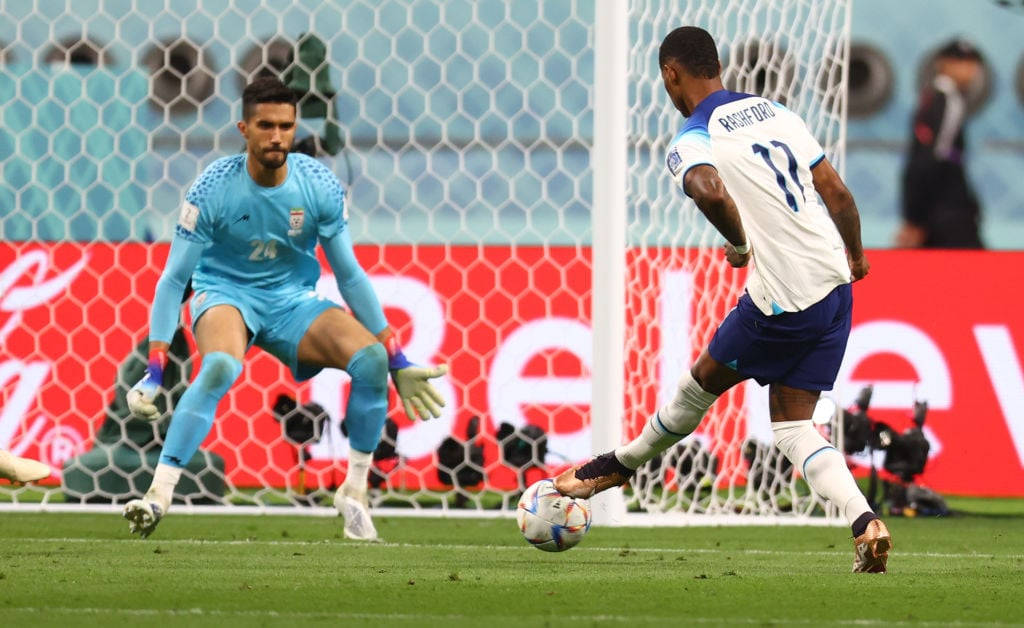
Marcus Rashford (no. 11, in white) is 1 on 1 against Hossein Hosseini (no. 24, in blue) and is attempting to score. The goalkeeper will try to stop the forward from scoring a goal by preventing the ball from passing the goal line.

In the sport of association football, a forward (alternatively known as an attacker) is an outfield position which primarily plays further up the pitch than midfielders and defenders. As with any attacking player, the role of the forward relies heavily on being able to create space for attack. Their advanced position and limited defensive responsibilities mean forwards normally score more goals on behalf of their team than other players.

Attacking positions generally favour direct players who take on the defense of the opponent in order to create scoring chances, where they benefit from a lack of predictability in attacking play. Modern team formations normally include one to three forwards. For example, the common 4–2–3–1 includes one forward. Less conventional formations may include more than three forwards, or sometimes none.

== Centre-forward ==
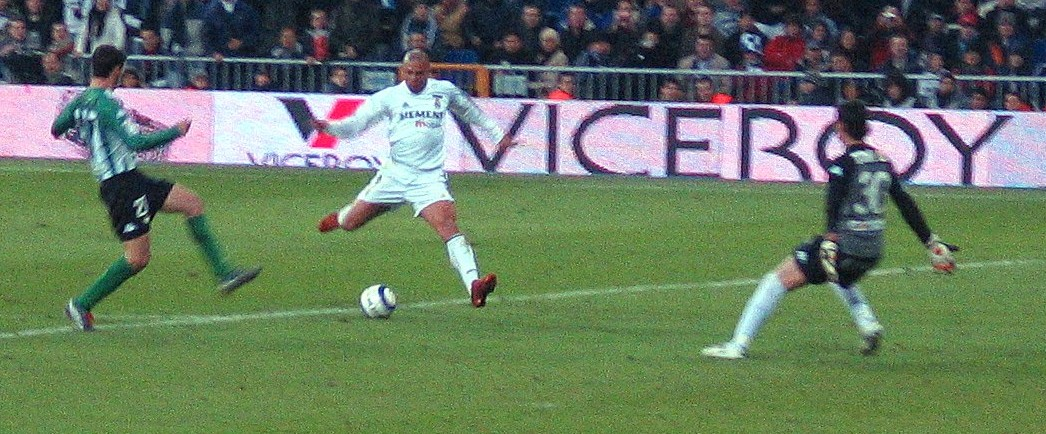
Brazilian striker Ronaldo (middle, in white) taking a shot at goal. A multi-functional forward, he has influenced a generation of strikers who followed.

The traditional shirt for centre-forwards is number 9. The traditional role is to score the majority of goals on behalf of the team.

If the players are tall and capable of immense physicality, with good heading ability, the player may also be used to get onto the end of crosses, win long balls, or receive passes and retain possession of the ball with their back to goal as teammates advance, to provide depth for their team or help teammates score by providing a pass ('through ball' into the box), the latter variation usually requiring quicker pace and good movement, in addition to finishing ability. Most modern centre-forwards operate in front of the second strikers or central attacking midfielders, and do the majority of the ball handling outside the box. The present role of a centre-forward is sometimes interchangeable with that of an attacking midfielder or second striker, however, especially in the 4–3–1–2 or 4–1–2–1–2 formations. The term centre-forward is taken from the earlier football playing formations, such as the 2–3–5, in which there were five forward players: two outside forwards, two inside forwards, and one centre-forward. The term "target forward" is often used interchangeably with that of a centre-forward, but usually describes a particular type of striker, who is usually a tall and physically strong player, who is adept at heading the ball; their main role is to win high balls in the air, hold up the ball, and create chances for other members of the team, in addition to possibly scoring many goals themselves. However, the two terms are not necessarily synonymous, with the target forward having developed into a more specialised role, while the centre-forward description is broader, encompassing many types of forwards.

When numbers were introduced in the 1933 English FA Cup final, one of the two centre-forwards that day wore the number 9 – Everton's Dixie Dean, a strong, powerful forward who had set the record for the most goals scored in a season in English football during the 1927–28 season. The number would then become synonymous with the centre-forward position (only worn that day because one team was numbered 1–11 whilst the other was numbered 12–22).

== Striker ==
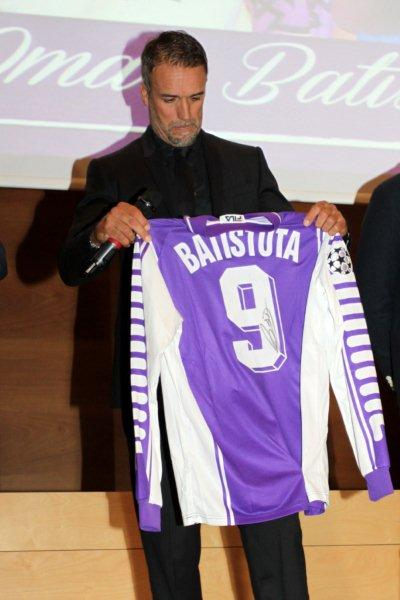
Gabriel Batistuta holding his old number 9 Fiorentina jersey. The number most associated with the position, he was an out-and-out striker.

The role of a striker is rather different from that of a traditional centre-forward, although the terms centre-forward and striker are used interchangeably at times, as both play further up the field than other players, while tall, heavy and technical players, like Marco Van Basten, Zlatan Ibrahimović, and Edin Džeko, have qualities which are suited to both positions. Like the centre-forward, the traditional role of a striker is to score goals; strikers are therefore known for their ability to peel off defenders and to run into space via the blind side of the defender and to receive the ball in a good goalscoring position, as typified by Ronaldo, Andriy Shevchenko and Thierry Henry. They are typically fast players with good ball control and dribbling abilities. Shorter-statured, more agile strikers like Michael Owen, Romário, Dries Mertens, Sergio Agüero, and Paulo Dybala have an advantage over taller defenders due to their short bursts of speed.

Good strikers should be able to shoot confidently with either foot, possess great power and accuracy, and have the ability to link up with teammates and pass the ball under pressure in breakaway situations. While many strikers wear the number 9 shirt, such as Alan Shearer, an out and out striker, the position, to a lesser degree, is also associated with the number 10, which is frequently worn by more creative deep-lying forwards such as Pelé, and occasionally with numbers 7 and 11, which are often associated with wingers.

== Second striker ==
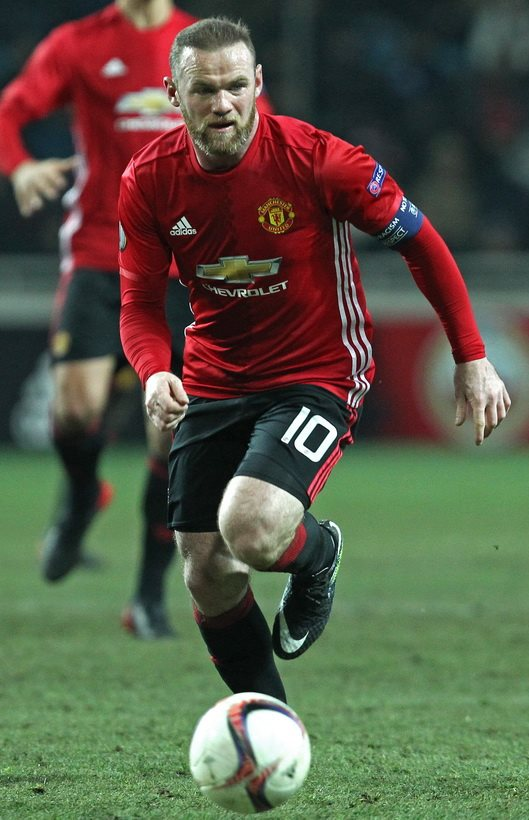
Wayne Rooney, shown wearing the number 10 jersey, was used at Manchester United as a second striker on many occasions, playing behind the number 9.

Deep-lying forwards or second strikers have a long history in the game, but the terminology to describe their playing activity has varied over the years. Originally, such players were termed inside forwards, creative or deep-lying centre-forwards ("sub forwards"). More recently, the role has occasionally been colloquially referred to as the centre-forward role, however, two more variations of this old type of player have developed: the second, or shadow, or support, or auxiliary striker and, in what is in fact a distinct position unto its own, the number 10; the former role is exemplified by players such as Dennis Bergkamp (who would play just behind the striker Thierry Henry at Arsenal), Alessandro Del Piero at Juventus, Youri Djorkaeff at Inter Milan, or Teddy Sheringham at Tottenham Hotspur. Other creative offensive players who play further back, such as Lionel Messi, Diego Maradona, Ronaldinho, Kaká, Rivaldo, Michael Laudrup, and Zinedine Zidane are often instead described as the "number 10", and usually operate as an attacking midfielder or advanced playmaker.

The second striker position is a loosely defined and most often misunderstood description of a player positioned in a free role, somewhere between the out-and-out striker, whether the player is a "target man" or more of a "poacher", and the number 10 or attacking midfielder, while possibly showing some of the characteristics of both. In fact, a term coined by French advanced playmaker Michel Platini, the "nine-and-a-half", which he used to describe the playing role of his successor in the number 10 role at Juventus, Italian playmaker Roberto Baggio, has been an attempt to become a standard in defining the position.

Conceivably, a number 10 can alternate as a second-striker provided that the player is also a prolific goalscorer; otherwise, a mobile forward with good technical ability (dribbling skills and ball control), acceleration, vision, passing, and link-up play, who can receive the ball and retain possession, in addition to being capable of scoring goals and creating opportunities for a less versatile centre-forward, is more suited to playing in the second striker role. This player should also be able to position themselves well in order to receive passes and subsequently either create or finish off a goalscoring opportunity. They should also be capable of finishing well with either foot as well as their head (which is less common, seeing as many second strikers are diminutive creative players), as this will lead to a good scoring percentage on attempts on goal and give their team an advantage offensively. Although they are often deployed in a free role, and given "license to roam", and either run forward or drop further back in order to pick up the ball in deeper areas, giving them more time and space in possession, second or support strikers do not tend to get as involved in the orchestration of attacks as the number 10, nor do they bring as many other players into play, since they do not share the burden of responsibility, functioning mostly in a supporting role as assist providers. In Italy, this role is known as a rifinitore, mezzapunta, or seconda punta, whereas in Brazil, it is known as segundo atacante or ponta-de-lança.

== Inside forward ==
2–3–5 formation: the inside forwards (red) flank the centre-forward.

The position of inside forward was popularly used in the late nineteenth and the first half of the twentieth centuries. The inside forwards would support the centre-forward, running and making space in the opposition defence, and, as the passing game developed, supporting him with passes. The role is broadly analogous to the "hole" or second striker position in the modern game, although here, there were two such players, known as inside right and inside left.

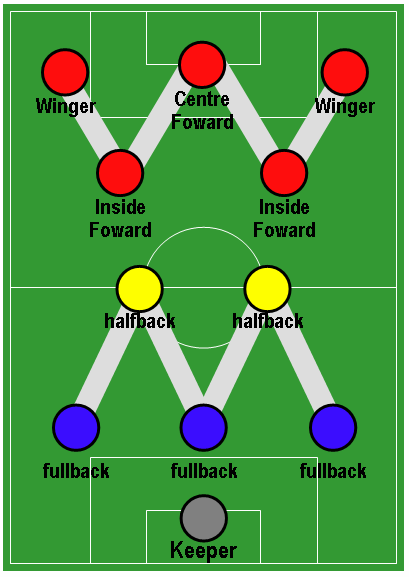
WM formation: the inside forwards (red) occupy a more withdrawn position supporting the centre-forward and outside right and left.

In early 2–3–5 formations, the inside-forwards would flank the centre-forward on both sides. With the rise of the WM formation, the inside forwards were brought back to become attacking midfielders, supplying balls to the centre-forward and the two attacking outside forwards – known as the outside right and outside left. In Italian football jargon, the inside forward was initially occasionally known as a mezzala (literally "half-winger", not to be confused with wing-half); however, the use of this particular term to describe inside forwards is now obsolete, as the mezzala label was later reapplied to describe the role of offensive-minded central midfielders in Italian football, while the inside forward role was instead labelled as interno ("internal", in Italian) in Italian football in subsequent years.

In today's game, inside forwards have been pushed up front to become either out-and-out attackers or false-9s, or out wide to wingers (in a 4–3–3 formation), or they have even been switched to a deeper position in which they are required to drop back to link-up with the midfield, while also supporting another striker playing alongside them up front (in a 4–4–2 formation). Many teams still employ one of their strikers in this latter, more withdrawn role as a support forward for the main striker, in a role broadly similar to the inside forward.

== Outside forward ==
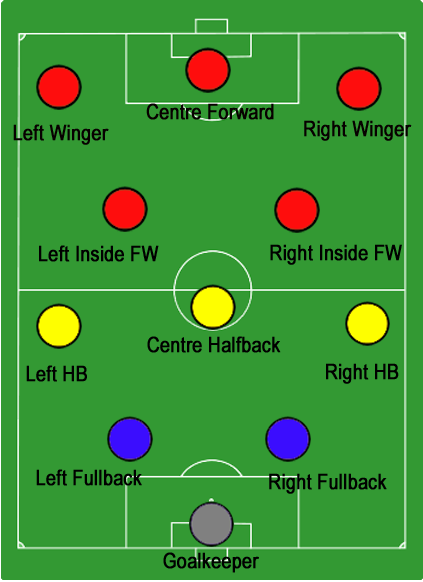
Vittorio Pozzo's Metodo system from the 1930s featured attacking wingers or outside forwards.

An outside forward plays as the advanced forward on the right or left wing – as an outside right or outside left, typically as part of a 2–3–5 formation or one of its variants. As football tactics have largely developed, and wingers have dropped back to become midfielders, the terminology has changed, and "outside forward" has become a historical term. Many commentators and football analysts still refer to the wing positions as "outside right" and "outside left". Such players in the modern era have been labelled "wing forwards", particularly when the two wingers play high up the pitch in a 4–3–3 or similar formation, where the front 3 attacking players have 3 central midfielders behind them. A wing forward who is known for cutting inside and shooting can have the term "inverted winger" used interchangeably.

The responsibilities of an outside forward include, but are not limited to:

- Scoring: their first option should be to shoot, while their second option should be to find another way to create a goal opportunity for the team.
- Passing: when they run into a shooting angle that is unlikely to become a goal, they must find a way to pass the ball to the middle of the penalty box area, allowing the centre-forwards to finish the job.
- Crossing: a main job of outside players, or players in the wide areas, especially forwards, is their ability to cross the ball to the middle of the field in front of the goal for the central players to score from

Due to these responsibilities, some of the most important attributes include:

- Good dribbling and circumventing defenders
- Speed as a necessity to produce effective counter-attacks
- Technical ability to strike a ball
- Quickness in deception to pass a defender
- Striking technique to get on the end of crosses from wide players of the opposing side

== Winger ==
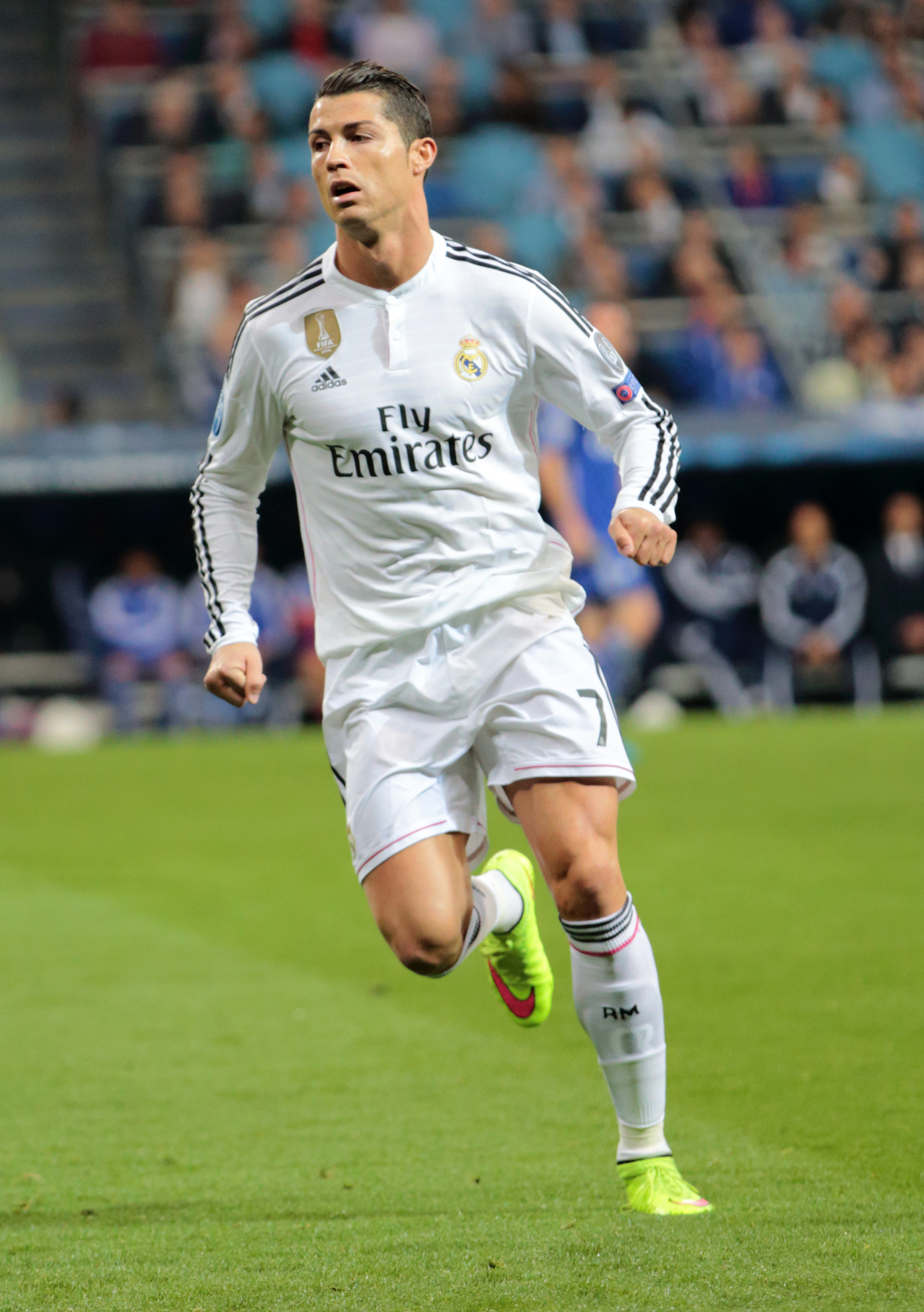
Cristiano Ronaldo has been deployed as an inverted winger.

A winger is an offensive player located in a wide position near the touchlines. They can be classified as forwards, considering their origin as the old "outside-forward" position, and continue to be termed as such in most parts of the world, especially in Latin and Dutch football cultures. However, in the British game (in which the 4–4–2 formation and its variants are most commonly used), they are usually counted as part of the midfield.

It is a winger's duty to beat opposing full-backs, deliver cut-backs or crosses from wide positions and, to a lesser extent, to beat defenders and score from close range. They are usually some of the quickest players on the team and usually have good dribbling skills as well. In Dutch, Spanish, and Portuguese usage, the defensive duties of the winger are usually confined to pressing the opposition fullbacks when they have the ball. Otherwise, a winger will drop closer to the midfield to make themself available, should their team win back the ball.

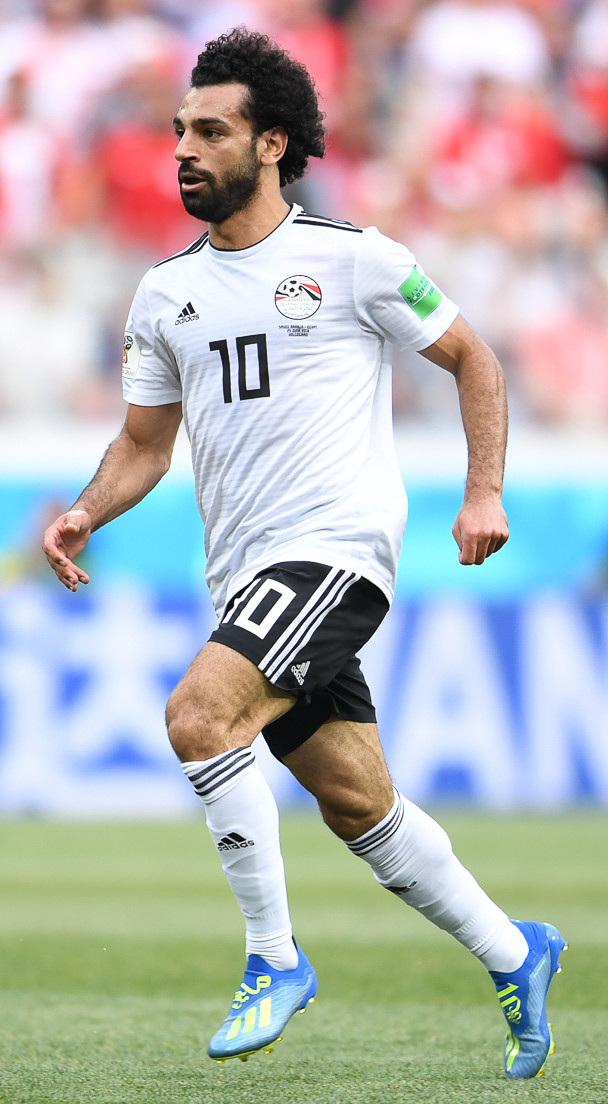
An inverted winger, Mohamed Salah plays on the right wing, a position which allows him to cut inside to his stronger left foot.

In British and other northern European styles of football, the wide-midfielder is expected to track back all the way to their own corner flag should their full-back require help, and also to track back their marker, as well as tucking into the midfield when the more central players are trying to pressure the opposition for the ball. This is a large responsibility for attack-orientated players, and particularly those like Joaquín (winger/wide midfielder), or Ryan Giggs (winger/striker), and John Barnes (winger/central midfielder), who lack the physical attributes of a wing-back or of a more orthodox midfield player. As these players grow older and lose their natural pace, they are frequently redeployed as "number 10s" between the midfield and the forward line, where their well-honed ball control, technical skills, ability to create chances, and improved reading of the game in the final third can serve to improve their teams' attacking options in tight spaces. An example is Inter Milan's use of veteran Luís Figo behind one or two other attackers, either as a second striker or in a playmaking role as an attacking midfielder.

In recent years, there has been a trend of playing inverted wingers – wide players stationed on the 'wrong' side of the pitch, to enable them to cut inside and shoot on their stronger foot and sometimes provide in-swinging crosses. This tactic was used by Frank Rijkaard, who, whilst at Barcelona, moved Lionel Messi from the left flank onto the right wing, initially against the player's wishes. This allowed him to cut into the centre and shoot or cross with his left foot. Another example of a successful inverted winger partnership was Bayern Munich's pairing of the left-footed Arjen Robben alongside the right-footed Franck Ribéry, on the right and left flanks respectively.

A description that has been used in the media to label a variation upon the inverted winger position is that of an "attacking", "false", or "goalscoring winger", as exemplified by Cristiano Ronaldo and Gareth Bale's roles on the left and right flanks during their time at Real Madrid in particular. This label has been used to describe an offensive-minded inverted winger, who will seemingly operate out wide on paper, but who instead will be given the freedom to make unmarked runs into more advanced central areas inside the penalty area, in order to get on the end of passes and crosses and score goals, effectively functioning as a striker. This role is somewhat comparable to what is known as the raumdeuter role in German football jargon (literally "space interpreter"), as exemplified by Thomas Müller, namely an attacking-minded wide player, who will move into central areas in order to find spaces from which he can receive passes and score or assist goals.

The "false winger" or "seven-and-a-half" is instead a label which has been used to describe a type of player who normally plays centrally, but who instead is deployed out wide on paper; during the course of a match, however, they will move inside and operate in the centre of the pitch, to drag defenders out of position, congest the midfield and give their team a numerical advantage in this area, so that they can dominate possession in the middle of the pitch and create chances for the forwards; this position also leaves space for full-backs to make overlapping attacking runs up the flank. Samir Nasri, who has been deployed in this role, once described it as that of a "non-axial playmaker".

On occasion, the role of an offensive winger can also be occupied by a different type of player. For example, certain managers have been known to use a "wide target man" on the wing, namely a large and physical player who usually plays as a centre-forward, and who will attempt to win aerial challenges and hold up the ball on the flank, or drag full-backs out of position. Jostein Flo epitomizes this role so much so that a tactic was named after him – Flo Pass. Egil Olsen, while managing the Norway national football team, positioned Flo, usually a centre-forward, on the right flank to exploit the opposition full-backs' lack of aerial abilities. Another example is Mario Mandžukić, a natural centre-forward, who was used on the left flank under manager Massimiliano Allegri at Juventus during the 2016–17 season, as well as the following season. Unlike wide target men of earlier eras, Mandžukić was also tasked with pressing opposing players. Romelu Lukaku has also been used in this role on occasion.

== False 9 ==
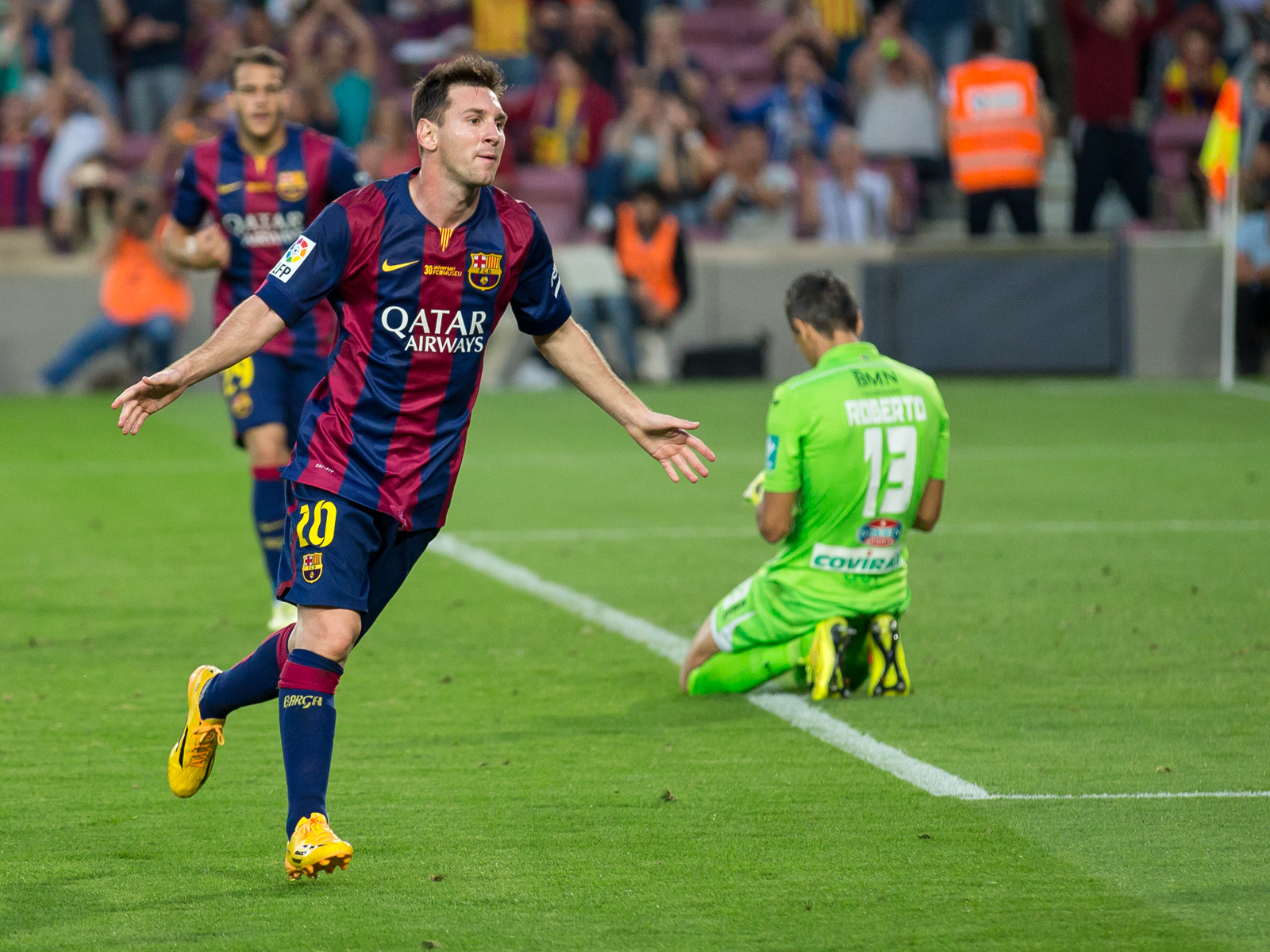
Lionel Messi (front, no. 10) has been used in the false 9 position to much success throughout parts of his career.

A false 9, similar to a more advanced attacking midfielder or playmaker, is an unconventional lone striker or centre-forward, who drops deep into midfield. A false 9 creates a problem for opposing centre-backs who can either follow the false 9, leaving space behind them for onrushing opponents to exploit, or giving the false 9 time and space to dribble or pick out a pass. The term comes from the traditional number for centre-forwards (nine), and the fact that a centre-forward traditionally stayed near the line of defenders until they had an opportunity to move past them toward the goal. Key attributes for a false 9 are similar to those of a deep-lying striker: dribbling ability to take advantage of space between the lines, good short passing ability to link up with the midfield and vision to play through teammates making runs from deep to goal.

The first false 9 in a World Cup was Juan Peregrino Anselmo in the Uruguay national team, although he could not play the match against Argentina in the 1930 World Cup due to injury. Matthias Sindelar was the false 9 of the Wunderteam, the Austria national team, in 1934. In South America, in 1941, River Plate's La Máquina team started using the left winger Adolfo Pedernera as a man of reference. When Pedernera transferred to Atlanta, a young Alfredo Di Stéfano took his place. A false 9 was also utilised by Hungary at the beginning of the 1950s, with striker Nándor Hidegkuti acting in the role as a deep-lying centre forward. In 1953, English football was astounded by the Hungarian team which defeated England 6–3 at Wembley Stadium. The Revie Plan was a variation on the tactics used by the Hungarians, involving Don Revie playing as a deep-lying centre-forward. Revie started attacks by coming into the centre of the field to receive the ball, drawing the opposing centre-half out of position. The role can also be compared to the false role in which Hidegkuti operated. The system was first implemented by the Manchester City reserve team. They used the system and went unbeaten for the last 26 games of the 1953–54 season. Before the start of the 1954–55 season, Manchester City manager Les McDowall called his team into pre-season training two weeks early to try the new tactic. Manchester City lost their first game using the system 5–0, but as the players got more used to the system, it started to become more successful. Manchester City used the system to help them reach the 1955 FA Cup Final, but they lost to Newcastle United 3–1. The following year, City again reached the final where they played Birmingham City, this time winning 3–1.

Throughout his career, Johan Cruyff was often deployed in a free role as a centre-forward with Ajax, Barcelona, and the Netherlands in the 1970s in Rinus Michels's fluid 1–3–3–3 formation, which was a key and trademark feature of the manager's total football system. Although Cruyff was a prolific goalscorer in this position, he also frequently dropped deep to confuse his markers and orchestrate attacks, or moved out onto the wing to create space for other teammates' runs, which has led certain pundits to compare this role retroactively as a precursor to the modern false 9 role.

Michael Laudrup was occasionally used as a lone centre-forward in Johan Cruyff's Barcelona Dream Team, a role which was similar to that of the modern false 9 role.

Roma under manager Luciano Spalletti used Francesco Totti, nominally an attacking midfielder or trequartista, up-front in an innovative "4–6–0" formation in the mid-2000s; this was met with a run of 11 consecutive victories.

At Euro 2012, Spain manager Vicente del Bosque, although sometimes deploying Fernando Torres as a traditional striker, often used Cesc Fàbregas as a false 9 in several matches, including the final. By the end of 2012, the false 9 had gone "mainstream" with many clubs employing a version of the system. Barcelona's Lionel Messi has been an epitome of the false 9 position to much success in recent years, first under coach Pep Guardiola and later under his successor Tito Vilanova. Brazilian forward Roberto Firmino was later also successfully used in the false 9 position under manager Jürgen Klopp at Liverpool.

One approach to stop false 9s has been to create congestion in the midfield by bringing several players back into a more defensive role in an attempt to deny them the space needed to create plays, notably in José Mourinho's "parking the bus" strategy.

In Italian football jargon, this role is historically known as the centravanti di manovra (which literally translates to "manoeuvring centre-forward"), due to the player's tendency to move freely and participate in the build-up of attacking plays.

== Target forward ==
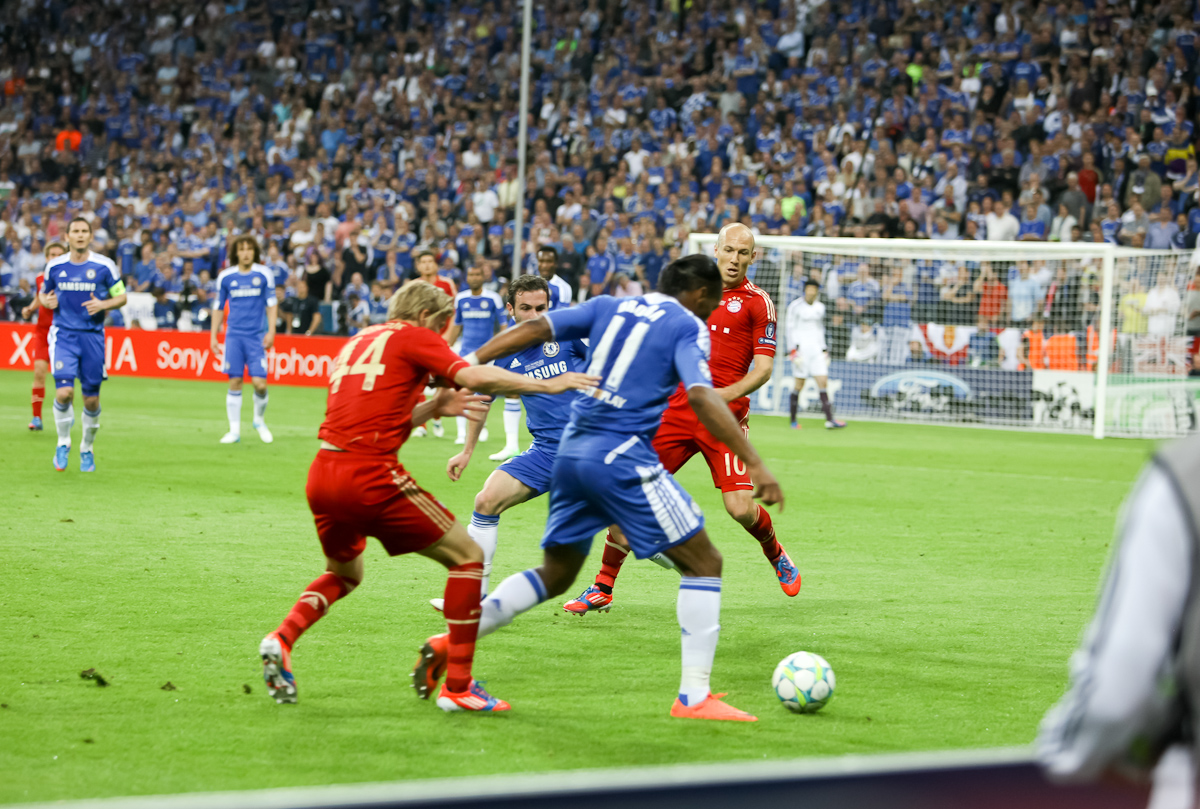
Didier Drogba (blue, no. 11), who often played as a target forward throughout his career, was known for his ability to hold up the ball, as demonstrated during the 2012 UEFA Champions League final against Bayern Munich.

The term "target forward" or "target man" or "target striker" is often used to describe a particular type of striker or centre-forward whose main role is to win high balls in the air, hold up the ball, and create chances for other members of the team in addition to scoring goals themselves. These players are usually tall and physically strong, adept at heading the ball, and capable of playing with their backs to goal in the final third of the pitch. Some of the most high-profile examples of this type of players in modern football include Olivier Giroud and Fernando Llorente, both World Cup winners, with the former having played the entire tournament as a starting line-up forward tasked primarily with pressing, counter-pressing, winning high or loose balls, and providing key passes to quicker and more agile teammates, namely Antoine Griezmann or Kylian Mbappé. Another example of a striker who played in this position is Didier Drogba. However, not any tall or physically strong player feels comfortable in the role of a "target man", despite having all the necessary features. Such forwards as Zlatan Ibrahimović, Romelu Lukaku, and Erling Haaland have all rejected the term when applied to specifically them, with Ibrahimović preferring to be described as an attacking all-rounder, while Lukaku and Haaland have said to favour poaching goals rather than physical play.

As stated above, the target forward is a player who does not run or look to make runs as compared to other forwards. Typically, they are strong, tall, and physical players. Usually, the build-up play of a target forward will often consist of one of the following options: firstly, the goalkeeper will either launch a long kick or distribute the ball to a central defender or full-back. From there, the defender will play a long ball to the striker, either in the air or on the ground. The target forward usually has perfected their ability to provide first touches of the ball on all areas of the body. They will control the ball and provide holdup, which allows their teammates to transition forward. From here, they may create more opportunities, such as passing the ball backwards and creating space by moving around defenders, making combination plays with a "false 9", midfielders, or wingers, or turning and facing the goal and attempting to score by dribbling or shooting. Because of their strength and physicality, target forwards may be defended against by man-to-man marking. Sometimes the central defender of the opposing team will be of similar strength and height, which makes the matchup more evenly balanced. Due to this man-to-man marking, target forwards are often fouled and receive many calls from the referee.

== Striker combinations ==
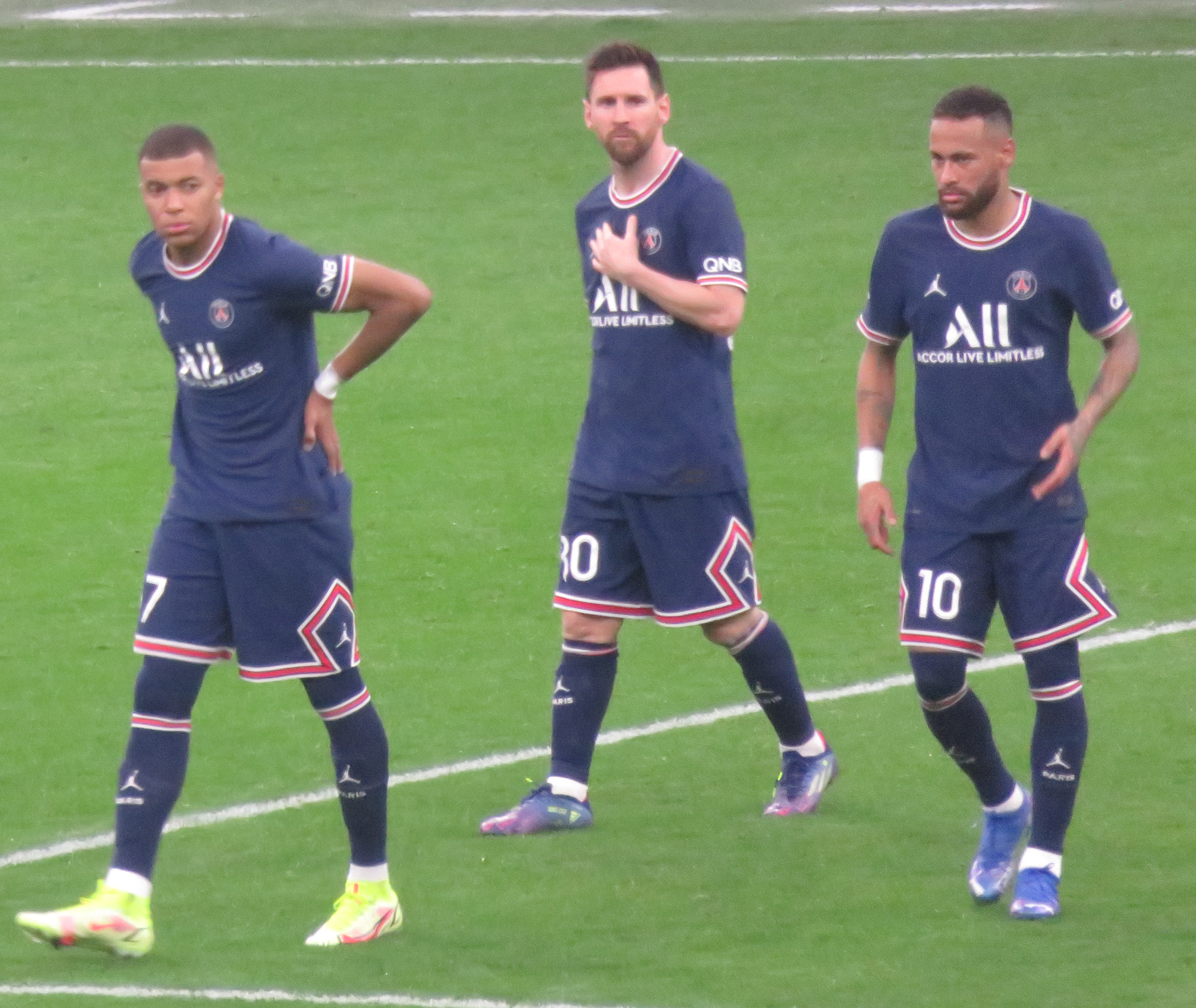
Paris Saint-Germain's MNM strike team of Kylian Mbappé (no. 7), Lionel Messi (no. 30) and Neymar (no. 10)

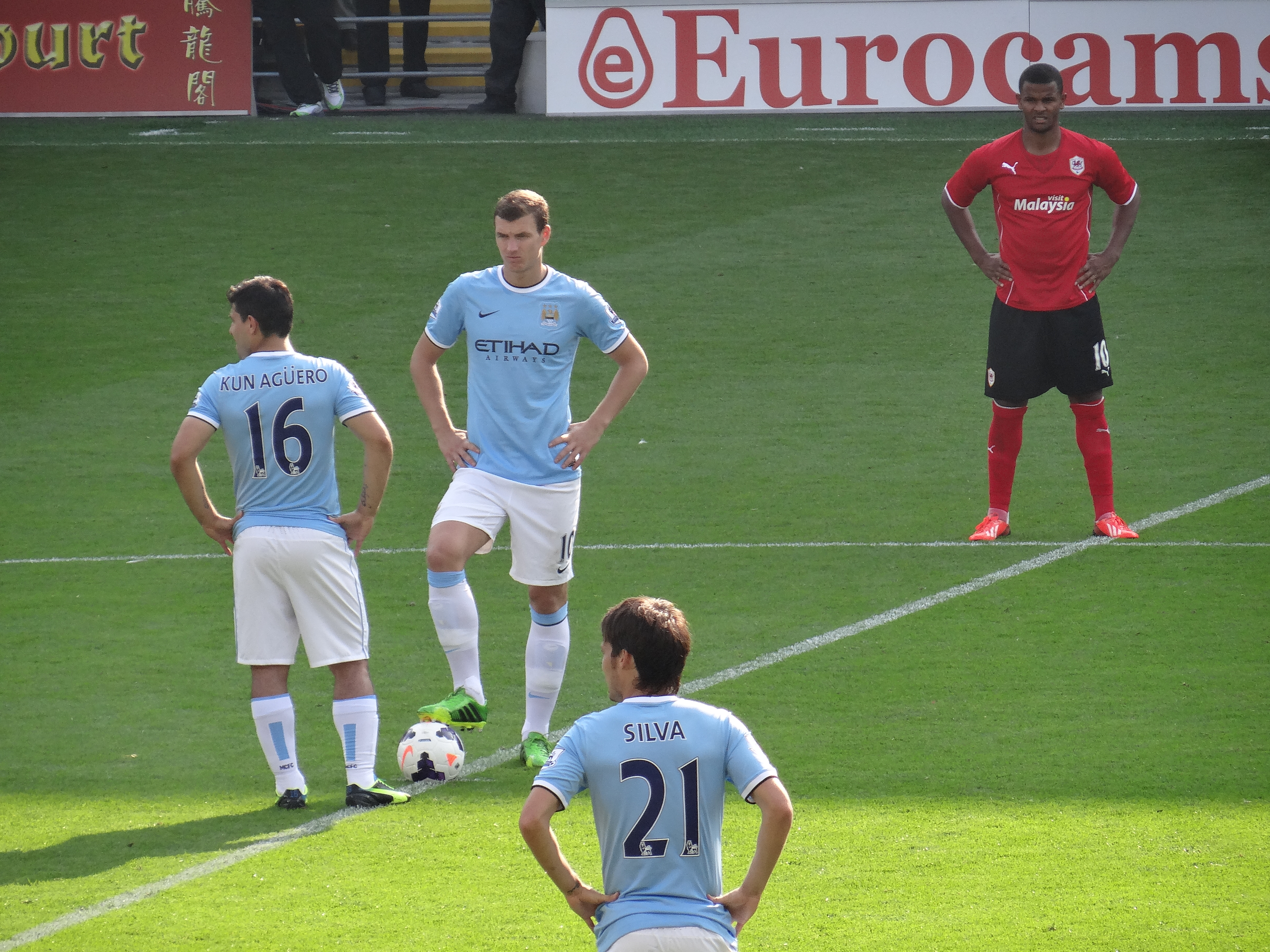
The Edin Džeko (blue, no. 10) and Sergio Agüero (no. 16) duo for Manchester City (2011–2015) is a recent example of a striker partnership made up of a taller and more physically imposing player combined with a shorter and technically gifted partner.

Strike teams consist of two or more strikers who work together. The history of football has been filled with many effective combinations. Three-man teams often operate in "triangles", giving a wealth of attacking options. Four-man packages expand options even more. Strikers must also be flexible and be able to switch roles at a moment's notice, between the first (advanced penetrator position), second (deep-lying manoeuvre), and third (support and expansion, e.g. wings) attacker roles.

Another example was the Total Football played by the Dutch team in the 70s, where the ability of their players, and in particular Johan Cruyff, to swap positions allowed a flexible attacking approach which opposition teams found difficult to effectively mark.

In a two-player front line, it is common for two forwards who complement one another to be paired together; for example, former Italy manager Cesare Maldini often used a large, physical, and prolific player as a traditional centre-forward – such as Christian Vieri – alongside a smaller, faster, creative and more technical player as a second striker – such as Roberto Baggio or Alessandro Del Piero.

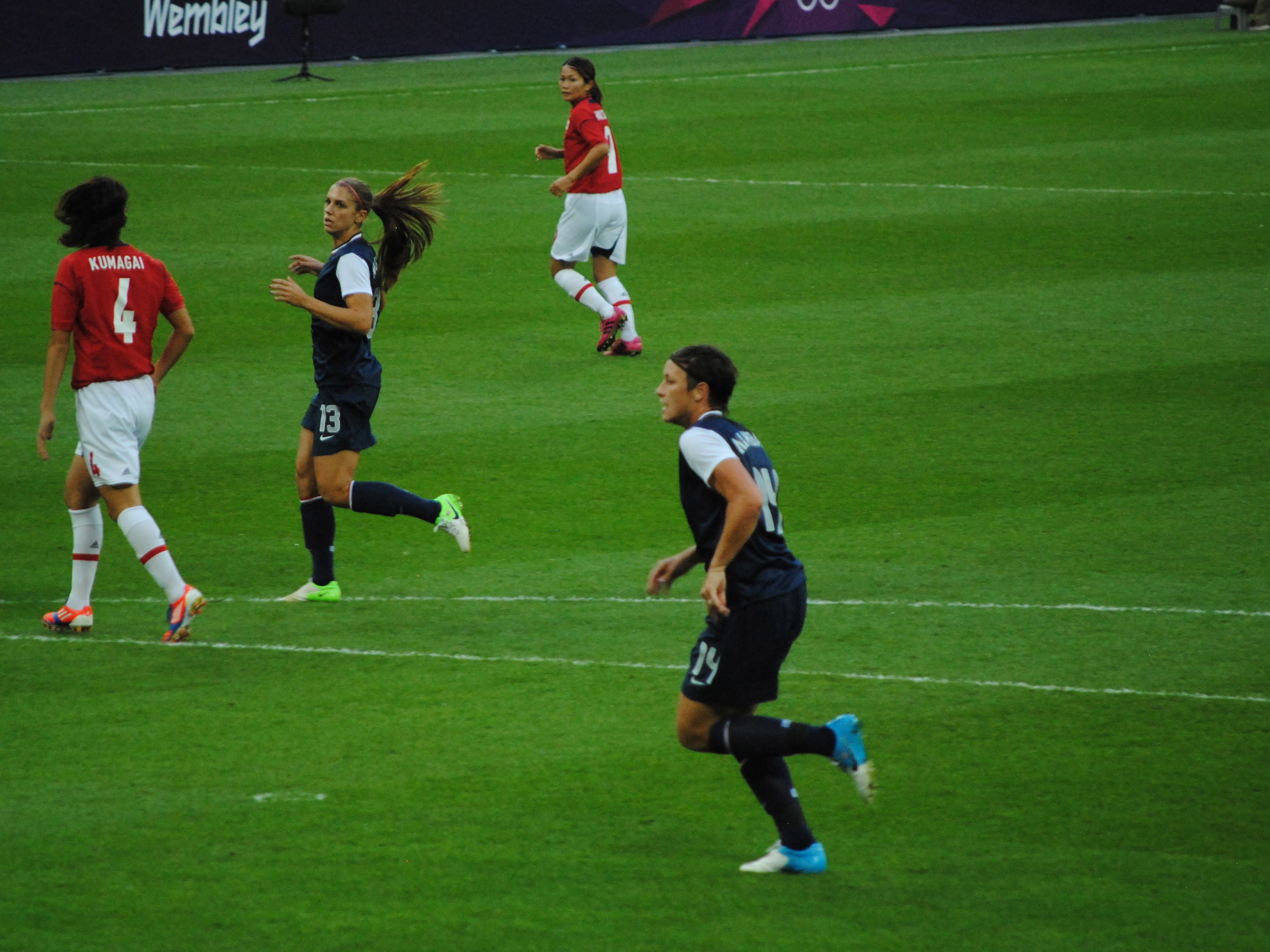
Alex Morgan (no. 13) and Abby Wambach (no. 14); Morgan and Wambach combined for 55 goals in 2012 – matching a 21-year-old record set in 1991 by Michelle Akers (39 goals) and Carin Jennings (16 goals) as the most goals scored by any duo in U.S. women's team history.

Another similar example of an effective partnership at international level was that of Alex Morgan and Abby Wambach with the United States national team, who scored a combined 55 goals in 2012, matching a 21-year-old record set in 1991 by Michelle Akers (39 goals) and Carin Jennings (16 goals) as the most goals scored by any duo in U.S. WNT history.

== Defensive capabilities ==
Although the striker is mainly an offensive position in many cases, they still play critical roles in defense that are often overlooked. Strikers can be involved in tactics such as high-pressing, cutting out passing lanes, defending set pieces, and tracking back (mostly for wingers). For high-pressure situations, this tactic is employed when the opposing team without the ball will defend the team all the way to their back line of defenders so that they have little area to pass or perform play buildup. Strikers will usually be at the forefront of this high-pressing movement and will attempt to direct ball movement. As part of this high-pressure technique, they can also cut out passing lanes. This means that they will position their bodies between an outside defender and a central defender or midfielders and center defenders so that the opposing player is not able to pass the ball or make a play. By performing this method, they can effectively force the opposing team into one area of the pitch and create better opportunities for the opposing team to turn the ball over. They are heavily used in the "delay, coverage, balance, and concentration principles of football" through a variety of methods. According to the delay principle of defense in football, the idea is that players should disturb the ball holder and block passing lanes, which is done in high-pressing and closing down. Closing down is the ability of a player to very quickly start defending the opposing player with the ball. This usually falls under the concentration principle of football, so strikers must be able to start defending the opposing team very high up in the opposing half. Although many believe strikers are not very involved in defensive strategies, they greatly help with "gathering defense to protect vital zones from progression of offensive actions, direct play to less vital zones, and allow for a regain of ball possession."

== See also ==
- Association football positions
- Association football tactics
- Defender
- Goalkeeper
- Midfielder
