= Long ball =

Association football term

In association football, a long ball, nicknamed route one, is a pass attempt that moves the ball a long distance on the field via one long aerial kick from either a goalkeeper or a defender directly to an attacking player, with the ball generally bypassing the midfield. Rather than arrive at the feet of the receiving attacking player, the attacker is expected to challenge the opposing defence in the air, with other attacking players and midfielders arriving to try to take possession of the ball if it breaks loose. It is a technique that can be especially effective for a team with either fast or tall strikers. The long ball technique is also a through pass from distance in an effort to get the ball by the defensive line and create a foot race between striker and defender. While often derided as either boring or primitive, it can prove effective where players or weather conditions suit this style; in particular, it is an effective counter-attacking style of play in which some defenders can be caught off-guard.

Not all lengthy passes are considered long ball play, and long but precise passes towards a particular teammate may not fit the description. Long-ball play is generally characterised by the relatively aimless nature of the kick upfield, with the ball simply being 'hoofed' high in the air towards the general location of the forwards, who, given the length of time the ball is in the air, will have time to arrive at the position where the ball will drop.

== Statistical basis ==
The 'long ball theory' was first discussed by a retired RAF Wing Commander—Charles Reep—in the 1950s in England. Reep was an amateur statistician and analysed not only the number of passes that led to a goal, but also the field positions where those passes originated. Reep documented his findings in various publications including match day programmes.

Reep developed a number of concepts describing effective long ball play. 'Gulleys' refer to the optimum position between the corner flag and six yard box from which to make the final pass into the penalty box; the '3-pass optimisation rule' emerges from the fact that a higher percentage of goals are scored in moves involving only three passes prior to the shot; the '9 shots per goal' maxim, stating that on average, only one goal is scored for every nine shots; and the 'twelve point three yard' position, which is the mean distance from the goal that all goals are scored. The long-ball game is also advocated in such books The Winning Formula: The Football Association Soccer Skills and Tactics, by Charles Hughes, which demonstrates with statistics that a majority of goals are scored within 5 passes of the ball.

Jonathan Wilson criticises Reep's statistical analysis as heavily flawed. The 'three pass optimum', for example, comes in for particular criticism. Wilson notes that while Reep's statistics showed that a higher percentage of goals were scored in moves involving three passes, they also show that three pass moves account for a higher percentage of all shots. Instead, the percentage of shots for which three-pass or fewer account is higher than the percentage of goals for which they account, implying that moves involving more passes have a higher ratio of success. Furthermore, Reep's own statistics show that this trend becomes stronger at higher levels of football, indicating that moves with a greater number of passes become more effective amongst higher quality teams. Reep also fails to distinguish statistically between three-pass moves that emerge from long balls and those that emerge from other sources such as attacking free kicks or successful tackles in the opponent's half.

== Effectiveness ==
The long ball strategy has often been criticised as a method that has held back the England national football team. Hughes became the head of coaching at the FA in the 1990s, and used this position to promote his theory of long ball, which followed on from the work of Reep. Hughes and those who defend the tactic claim that time and time again, teams playing direct play have more success. Examples of teams that have had success with the long-ball style of play include Wimbledon under Dave Bassett who were promoted from Division 4 to Division 1 over the span of four seasons from 1982–83 to 1985–86, and later won the 1988 FA Cup, as well as Cambridge United under John Beck who won back-to-back promotions from Division 4 to Division 2 in 1989–90 and 1990–91.

At the 1994 FIFA World Cup, for example, the winning Brazil team scored the most goals from three or fewer passes, while the team to score from a move involving the most passes - the Republic of Ireland - were eliminated in the second round. While multi-pass moves such as those by Brazil against Italy in the 1970 FIFA World Cup Final or Argentina versus Serbia and Montenegro at the 2006 FIFA World Cup are widely lauded as brilliant examples of football, it is partially the rareness of success for such long moves that results in their appreciation.

It is however used by teams desperate to score a goal before the end of a match, though this is probably as much due to the lack of time for a gradual build-up as it is for its perceived effectiveness. The long ball technique is also effective in lower level football matches since players lack skill to work as a team and pass the ball accurately up the field. A long ball is a quick counterattacking move and with a fast striker may produce multiple goals.

== Notable proponents ==
- Sam Allardyce
- Aidy Boothroyd
- Jack Charlton
- Terry Butcher
- Egil Olsen
- Tony Pulis
- Steve Bruce
- Russell Slade
- Gary Megson
- John Beck
- Graham Westley
- Alex McLeish
- Dave Bassett

== Examples ==
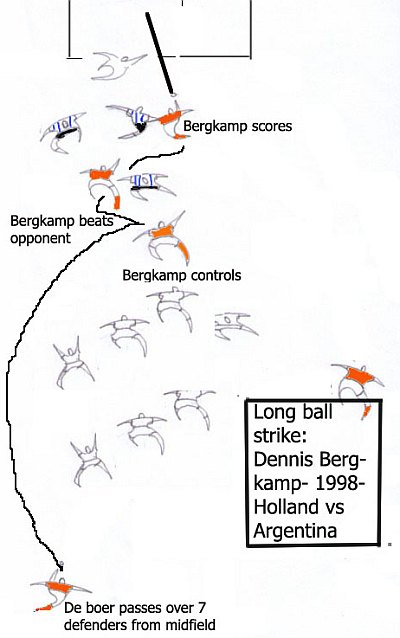
Bergkamp's goal against Argentina

The long ball is sometimes criticised as being used by weaker teams with less tactical skill. In the hands of mediocre teams, or at the lower youth leagues this might be so. Analysis of its implementation at world-class levels however, shows that effective use of long-ball techniques can be found in numerous competitive World Cup or championship club teams. It can be used as a counterattacking style, or as a daring through pass when opportunities open up during a game. The long ball requires top level skill to implement correctly. Mere passing is not the only variable—intelligent running into space, good dribbling and crisp finishing are also required.

One of the best uses of the long-ball was Netherlands striker Dennis Bergkamp's goal against Argentina in the 1998 FIFA World Cup. Dutch defender Frank de Boer initiated the move from near the middle of the field, with a long pass that curled over 7 opposing players. Bergkamp controlled the difficult ball, spun past a defender and smashed it home. The example illustrates the power of the long-ball style but also that it is more than simply pumping the ball upfield. Only Bergkamp's excellent skills were able to take advantage of the de Boer's outstanding, and daring pass. As such, it emphasises that football is a game requiring not only a comprehensive package of individual skills, but imagination and creativity as well. Both are present in the long-ball style.

Contemporary teams like Norway and Sweden have also demonstrated the viability of the long-ball approach when executed with skill, precision and creativity by top players. Norway played a characteristic 4-5-1 formation in the 1990s and early 21st century. The left back would often hit long crosses to Jostein Flo, who in turn would head the ball to either one of the central midfielders or to the striker. This was known as the Flo Pass, and the Norwegian national team garnered much criticism for its perceived long-ball approach. Egil Olsen did, however, take the national team to two World Cups, and the long ball style of play is considered to have played an important role in accomplishing this.

One of the greatest of the Norwegian goals scored with this style was by the striker Tore André Flo during the 1998 World Cup. Similar to the Bergkamp goal, but played to an advanced man on the wing, it began with an extremely long pass from Stig Inge Bjørnebye. Flo was alone when he received. He ran on and cut inside to beat his defending opponent, then slotted the ball past the goalkeeper Cláudio Taffarel. The Norwegians went on to upset the mighty Brazilian team in this match. However, Brazil had already won the group before this game took place while Norway needed to win.

Accurate passes aimed at a specific player are examples of individual long balls, but do not represent the spirit of a team playing a long-ball game. In that situation, the team would be pumping long-balls up repeatedly into an area, rather than a specific player, hoping the striker would get some of them and the percentages would pay off in the long-run.

The long ball can be very effective as a switch in game plan in pressure situations. In Chelsea's quarter-final victory over PSG in the 2013–14 UEFA Champions League, PSG needed to defend their 3–2 lead on aggregate for 10 more minutes when Fernando Torres entered the game as a substitute for Oscar. Chelsea's rehearsed gameplan for this scenario was to go direct from anywhere in the field, and PSG's defensive line fell very deep and very compressed. All secondary balls from either Chelsea or PSG players fell into spaces occupied solely by Chelsea players, leading to multiple goal scoring opportunities, one of which eventually taken by Demba Ba.

== See also ==
- Formation (association football)
- Football tactics and skills
- Revie Plan
- Flo Pass
- Total Football
- Striker
