= 2023 Coastal Carolina Chanticleers men's soccer team =

American college soccer season

2023 Coastal Carolina Chanticleers men's soccer
- Conference: Sun Belt Conference
- Record: 3-9-3 (1-6-2 Sun Belt)
- Head coach: Shaun Docking (26th season)
- Home stadium: Coastal Carolina University Soccer Field

2023 Sun Belt Conference men's soccer standings
	Conf.					Overall
Team	W		L		T	W		L		T
No. 8 Marshall ‡	7	–	2	–	0	18	–	3	–	0
No. 19 UCF +	6	–	2	–	1	10	–	4	–	2
No. 3 West Virginia +	5	–	1	–	3	17	–	3	–	4
No. 18 James Madison +	4	–	2	–	3	10	–	5	–	5
Kentucky +	3	–	3	–	3	8	–	8	–	4
Georgia State	3	–	4	–	2	6	–	7	–	5
South Carolina	3	–	4	–	2	6	–	9	–	3
Old Dominion	2	–	6	–	1	5	–	7	–	5
Georgia Southern	1	–	5	–	3	2	–	9	–	6
Coastal Carolina	1	–	6	–	2	3	–	9	–	3
‡ – 2023 Sun Belt Conference tournament champion + – At-large invitation to the 2023 NCAA tournament; As of December 12, 2023; Rankings from United Soccer Coaches; Source: Sun Belt

The 2023 Coastal Carolina Chanticleers men's soccer team represented Coastal Carolina University during the 2023 NCAA Division I men's soccer season and the 2023 Sun Belt Conference men's soccer season. The regular season began on August 24 and concluded on November 9. It was the program's 46th season fielding a men's varsity soccer team, and their 8th season in the Sun Belt. The 2023 season was Shaun Docking's 26th year as head coach for the program.

== Preseason ==
The preseason poll will be released in late August 2023.

SBC preseason poll
Predicted finish	Team	Votes (1st place)
1	Kentucky	93 (6)
2	Marshall	91 (2)
3	West Virginia	77 (1)
4	UCF	68 (1)
5	South Carolina	49
6T	Coastal Carolina	45
6T	Georgia State	45
8	James Madison	40
9	Old Dominion	26
10	Georgia Southern	16

== Roster ==
As of November 29, 2023

Note: Flags indicate national team as defined under FIFA eligibility rules; some limited exceptions apply. Players may hold more than one non-FIFA nationality.

No.	Pos.	Nation	Player
1	GK	(England) ENG	Alex Hare
2	DF	(Republic of Ireland) IRL	Donal Rahill
3	MF	(United States) USA	Paolo Roditti
4	DF	(Netherlands) NED	Joep Joshua de Bruin
5	MF	(United States) USA	Luc Mikula
6	MF	(United States) USA	Jason Kemble
7	GK	(Iceland) ISL	Eythor Kjartansson
8	MF	(United States) USA	Aidan Melville
9	FW	(Canada) CAN	Deryn Armstrong
10	DF	(Iceland) ISL	Asgeir Magnusson
11	FW	(Germany) GER	Noe Santos
12	MF	(United States) USA	Doug Hainer
13	FW	(United States) USA	Max Wright
14	MF	(Germany) GER	Simon Wittman
15	DF	(Australia) AUS	PEwan Gordon
16	MF	(Netherlands) NED	Loed Klaasen

No.	Pos.	Nation	Player
17	MF	(South Korea) KOR	Taein Ka
18	MF	(Canada) CAN	Noah Lechelt
19	MF	(Germany) GER	Djavid Abdullatif
20	DF	(United States) USA	Lincoln Ulrich
21	MF	(United States) USA	Christian Cook
22	MF	(Iceland) ISL	Robert Vladimarrson
23	DF	(United States) USA	Ethan Stewart
24	FW	(England) ENG	Evan Howard
25	FW	(Iceland) ISL	Kari Sigfusson
26	DF	(Iceland) ISL	Gudjon Stefansson
27	DF	(Iceland) ISL	Anton Bjarkason
29	GK	(United States) USA	Tristan Himes
30	GK	(United States) USA	Ian Turnbull
31	GK	(Austria) AUT	Killian Vallant
32	FW	(United States) USA	Daryl Dikoum
33	DF	(Luxembourg) LUX	Louis Bock

== Schedule ==
Date Time, TV	Rank^{#}	Opponent^{#}	Result	Record	Site (Attendance) City, State
Non-conference regular season
August 24*		Winthrop	L 0–2	0–1–0	CCU Soccer Field (213); Conway, SC
August 28*		William & Mary	W 2-1	1–1–0	CCU Soccer Field (120); Conway, SC
September 1*		USC Upstate	W 1-0	2–1–0	CCU Soccer Field (175); Conway, SC
September 5*		at College of Charleston	L 0-2	2–2–0	Patriots Point Soccer Complex (263); Mount Pleasant, SC
September 11*		Furman	L 0-3	2–3–0	CCU Soccer Field (110); Conway, SC
Sun Belt Conference regular season
September 11		at Georgia Southern	T 0-0	2–3–1 (0-0-1)	Eagle Field (401); Statesboro, GA
September 19*		UNC Greensboro	T 1-1	2-3-2	CCU Soccer Field (200); Conway, SC
September 23		No. 12 James Madison	W 3-2	3-3-2 (1-0-1)	CCU Soccer Field (205); Conway, SC
September 30		at Old Dominion	L 1-3	3-4-2 (1-1-1)	Old Dominion Soccer Complex (463); Norfolk, VA
October 7		Kentucky	T 1-1	3-4-3 (1-1-2)	CCU Soccer Field (174); Conway, SC
October 13		at No. 1 Marshall	L 1-6	3-5-3 (1-2-2)	Hoops Family Field (1,861); Huntington, WV
October 18		at No. 2 UCF	L 0-5	3-6-3 (1-3-2)	UCF Soccer and Track Stadium (795); Orlando, FL
October 22		No. 5 West Virginia	L 0-2	3-7-3 (1-4-2)	CCU Soccer Field (312); Conway, SC
October 27		at South Carolina	L 3-4	3-8-3 (1-5-2)	Stone Stadium (3,778); Columbia, SC
October 31		Georgia State	L 0-1	3-9-3 (1-6-2)	CCU Soccer Field (110); Conway, SC
*Non-conference game. ^{#}Rankings from United Soccer Coaches. (#) Tournament seedings in parentheses. All times are in Eastern Time.
