= 2023 NCAA Division I men's soccer season =

American college soccer season

- Duration: August 24 – December 10, 2023
- Number of teams: 211
- Preseason No. 1: Syracuse
- Top goalscorer: 19 goals Charlie Sharp (Western Michigan)

Statistics
- Biggest home win: 8 goals: Lindenwood 8–0 University of Health Sciences and Pharmacy in St. Louis (September 19) Stony Brook 8–0 St. Joseph's University (Long Island) (September 26) Saint Louis 8–0 Blackburn College (October 24-)
- Biggest away win: 8 goals: Western Illinois 0–8 Oral Roberts (September 23)
- Highest scoring: 9 goals Presbyterian 8–1 Southern Wesleyan (August 24) Northern Illinois 7–2 Aurora (September 4) Western Michigan 5–4 Dayton (September 10) Cal State Fullerton 5–4 CSUN (September 27) Charlotte 6–3 Central Arkansas (September 30) Holy Cross 5–4 UMass Lowell (October 3) Long Island 6–3 Le Moyne (October 29)
- Longest winning run: 5 games Clemson November 19-present
- Longest unbeaten run: 15 games Indiana September 26-present
- Longest winless run: 18 games UAB (0-13-6) October 18, 2022–present
- Longest losing run: 7 games UAB September 29-present
- Highest attendance: 8,574 SIU Edwardsville vs Saint Louis @ CityPark (September 2)

Tournament
- Duration: November 15 to December 10, 2023

Men's College Cup
- Date: December 8–11
- Site: Lynn Family Stadium; Louisville, KY
- Champions: Clemson
- Runners-up: Notre Dame

Seasons
- ← 2022 2024 →

The 2023 NCAA Division I men's soccer season was the 65th season of NCAA championship men's college soccer. The season began on August 24, 2023 and concluded on December 10, 2023. Syracuse is the defending national champion.

The Clemson Tigers won their fourth national title, and their first since 2021, defeating Notre Dame in the final.

== Changes from 2022 ==
=== Coaching changes ===
The following coaching changes occurred during the 2022–23 offseason.

Program	Outgoing coach	Manner of departure	Date of vacancy	Incoming coach	Date of appointment
Cal Poly	Steve Sampson	Retired	October 18, 2022	Oige Kennedy	December 9, 2022
Temple	Brian Rowland	Fired	November 11, 2022	Bryan Green	December 22, 2022
Rider	Charlie Inverso	Retired	November 12, 2022	Chad Duernberger	January 3, 2023
Jacksonville	Mauricio Ruiz	Resigned	November 2, 2022	Ali Simmons	December 19, 2022
Georgia Southern	John Murphy	Resigned	November 4, 2022	Lee Squires	December 14, 2022
Bryant	Seamus Purcell	Retired	November 14, 2022	Ruben Resendes	December 7, 2022
Gardner–Webb	Tony Setzer	Fired	November 8, 2022	Scott Wells	December 22, 2022
Robert Morris	Jason O'Keefe	Resigned	November 10, 2022	Jonathan Potter	December 20, 2022
Saint Francis (PA)	Frank Olszewski	Hired by Notre Dame of Maryland	November 18, 2022	Mads Kaiser	December 12, 2022
Detroit Mercy	Nicholas Deren	Fired	November 28, 2022	Nate Kopunek	March 6, 2023
Lindenwood	Carl Hutter	Fired	November 29, 2023	Kris Bertsch	January 11, 2023
Presbyterian	Jonathan Potter	Hired by Robert Morris	December 20, 2022	Nick Finotti	January 24, 2023
Oregon State	Terry Boss	Resigned	December 22, 2022	Greg Dalby	January 26, 2023
UMBC	Pete Caringi	Retired	January 31, 2023	Anthony Adams	February 6, 2023
Evansville	Marshall Ray	Resigned	March 14, 2023	Robbe Tarver	March 14, 2023
Columbia	Kevin Anderson	Hired by Southern Connecticut	March 30, 2023	Michael Casper	July 7, 2023
Wright State	Jake Slemker	Fired	March 30, 2023	Alex Van der Sluijs	April 18, 2023
Seattle U	Pete Fewing	Resigned	April 4, 2023	Nate Daligcon	April 4, 2023
Le Moyne	Tom Bonus	Retired	July 5, 2023	Callum Donnelly	July 18, 2023
Drexel	Michael Marchiano	Resigned	July 19, 2023	Mark Fetrow	July 28, 2023
Cal State Bakersfield	Richie Grant	Resigned	July 25, 2023	Adam Grant	July 25, 2023
St. Francis Brooklyn	Tom Giovatto	Athletic program disbanded	March 23, 2023	—N/a	—N/a

=== Conference realignment ===
The ongoing conference realignment had two especially significant impacts on men's soccer in the 2023 season.

First, the Mid-American Conference announced on November 11, 2022 that it would no longer sponsor men's soccer after the 2022 season. The MAC had dropped to five men's soccer members during the realignment cycle, and was unable to find the sixth member needed to maintain its automatic bid to the NCAA tournament. The four full MAC members that sponsored the sport found new conference homes within a week, with Akron joining the Big East Conference and Bowling Green, Northern Illinois, and Western Michigan joining the Missouri Valley Conference. The one associate member of the group, full independent Chicago State, was temporarily left without a home for its own program.

Then, on March 28, 2023, the Ohio Valley Conference (OVC) announced that it would launch a men's soccer league in the 2023 season with eight members, equally divided between full members and associates. Three full OVC members (Eastern Illinois, Lindenwood, Southern Indiana) moved men's soccer from the Summit League, with the other full member (SIU Edwardsville) leaving the Missouri Valley Conference. The new associates are the aforementioned Chicago State; Houston Christian, which formerly housed men's soccer in the Western Athletic Conference; Incarnate Word, which had played the 2022 season as an independent; and Liberty, which left the Atlantic Sun Conference (which sponsors soccer for both sexes) for Conference USA (which sponsors it only for women). Western Illinois later joined the Ohio Valley for all sports this season as well. Western had originally planned to join the OVC's new league as its ninth men's soccer program. However, the conference had already built its schedule, which includes air travel. Therefore, Western instead opted to stay with the Summit League as an affiliate in order for the conference to stay at 6 members and retain its automatic bid to the NCAA tournament while they look to add more members, and will move the sport over to the OVC in 2024.

Team	Conference in 2022	Conference in 2023
Akron	Mid-American	Big East
Bowling Green	Mid-American	MVC
Campbell	Big South	CAA
Chicago State	Mid-American	OVC
Eastern Illinois	Summit	OVC
Hartford	Independent	CCC (Division III)
Houston Christian	WAC	OVC
Incarnate Word	Independent	OVC
Le Moyne	NE-10 (Division II)	NEC
Liberty	ASUN	OVC
Lindenwood	Summit	OVC
Northern Illinois	Mid-American	MVC
St. Francis Brooklyn	NEC	None (dropped athletics)
SIU Edwardsville	MVC	OVC
Southern Indiana	Summit	OVC
UCF	The American	Sun Belt
Western Michigan	Mid-American	MVC

The 2023 season was the last for at least 11 men's college soccer teams in their then-current conferences:

School	Current conference	Future conference
California	Pac-12	ACC
Chicago State	OVC	NEC
Merrimack	NEC	MAAC
Oregon State	Pac-12	WCC
Sacred Heart	NEC	MAAC
San Diego State	Pac-12	WAC
SMU	American	ACC
Stanford	Pac-12	ACC
UCLA	Pac-12	Big Ten
Washington	Pac-12	Big Ten
Western Illinois	Summit	OVC

== New programs ==
On May 10, Le Moyne College announced that it had accepted an invitation to join the Northeast Conference and would begin the transition to Division I.

== Discontinued programs ==
In March 2023, St. Francis College, athletically known as St. Francis Brooklyn, announced that it would shut down its entire athletic program at the end of the 2022–23 school year.

== Other news ==
- May 24, 2023 – George Washington University announced that it would change its nickname from Colonials to Revolutionaries.
- July 20 – The Colonial Athletic Association announced a name change to Coastal Athletic Association.
- October 4 – The Division I Council approved changes to the transfer window for all sports. In fall sports other than football, including men's and women's soccer, the transfer portal now opens for a total of 45 days. A 30-day fall window opens 7 days after championship selections are made, followed by a spring window from May 1–15.

== Season outlook ==
=== Preseason polls ===
United Soccer Coaches
Rank	Team
1	Syracuse (4)
2	Indiana (1)
3	Kentucky (1)
4	Duke (1)
5	Pittsburgh
6	Washington
7	Stanford
8	Creighton
9	Clemson
10	UNC Greensboro
11	Marshall (1)
12	Vermont
13	Portland
14	Maryland
15	Virginia
16	Tulsa
17	Georgetown
18	Wake Forest
19	SMU
20	Cornell
21	FIU
22	Akron
23	New Hampshire
24	Saint Louis
25	Penn

Top Drawer Soccer
Rank	Team
1	Syracuse
2	Indiana
3	Washington
4	Clemson
5	Duke
6	Kentucky
7	Pittsburgh
8	Stanford
9	Marshall
10	UNC Greensboro
11	Maryland
12	Georgetown
13	Vermont
14	Cornell
15	Portland
16	Creighton
17	Wake Forest
18	SMU
19	Denver
20	Tulsa
21	Saint Louis
22	Akron
23	High Point
24	FIU
25	Pennsylvania

College Soccer News
Rank	Team
1	Syracuse
2	Indiana
3	Kentucky
4	Duke
5	Washington
6	Pittsburgh
7	UNC Greensboro
8	Clemson
9	Stanford
10	Vermont
11	Marshall
12	Creighton
13	Portland
14	FIU
15	Wake Forest
16	Virginia
17	Maryland
18	Denver
19	Tulsa
20	Georgetown
21	Akron
22	Cornell
23	Western Michigan
24	SMU
25	Lipscomb
26	Pennsylvania
27	UCLA
28	New Hampshire
29	Saint Louis
30	Ohio State

== Regular season ==
=== Major upsets ===
In this list, a "major upset" is defined as a game won by an unranked team that defeats a ranked team, or a team ranked 10 spots lower than the other team.

All rankings are from the United Soccer Coaches Poll.

Date	Winner	Score	Loser
August 24	UCF	2–1	@ No. 9 Clemson
August 24	Missouri State	1–0	@ No. 14 Maryland
August 24	@ Louisville	1–0	No. 16 Tulsa
August 25	@ San Diego	2–0	No. 6 Washington
August 27	Loyola Marymount	3–1	@ No. 15 Virginia
August 29	@ Lipscomb	2–1	No. 15 Saint Louis
September 1	@ Wisconsin	1–0	No. 2 Kentucky
September 1	@ Georgetown	4–1	No. 8 Pittsburgh
September 1	No. 23 Washington	1–0	@ No. 10 Indiana
September 1	@ Denver	3–1	No. 11 SMU
September 1	CSUN	3–1	@ No. 12 San Diego
September 2	SIUE	2–0	No. 15 Saint Louis @ CityPark
September 2	@ California Baptist	2–0	No. 25 Loyola Marymount
September 4	@ UIC	2–0	No. 21 Wisconsin
September 8	New Hampshire	2–1	@ No. 11 FIU
September 8	Penn	3–0	@ No. 14 Penn State
September 8	@ South Florida	1–0	No. 15 Indiana
September 9	@ No. 16 West Virginia	1–0	No. 3 Portland
September 9	@ Pittsburgh	3–0	No. 9 Wake Forest
September 12	Michigan State	1–0	@ No. 10 Notre Dame
September 15	Virginia Tech	2–1	@ No. 3 Louisville
September 15	@ Clemson	2–0	No. 8 Duke
September 15	@Creighton	2–1	No. 13 Marquette
September 15	South Carolina	1–0	@ No. 24 Kentucky
September 16	@ Grand Canyon	1–0	No. 22 San Diego
September 16	@ UMBC	2–1	No. 25 Cornell
September 17	Oregon State	2–1	@ No. 1 Stanford
September 19	@ Cornell	2–1	No. 7 Syracuse
September 19	@ Georgetown	2–0	No. 12 James Madison
September 21	@ Seattle	3–2	No. 20 Washington
September 23	@ Coastal Carolina	3–2	No. 12 James Madison
September 24	@ North Carolina	2–1	No. 11 Duke
September 24	@ No. 20 Washington	3–1	No. 5 Portland
September 28	California	1–0	@ No. 17 San Diego State
September 29	@ No. 21 Duke	5–3	No. 7 Syracuse
September 29	@ Virginia	3–0	No. 8 Louisville
September 30	Western Michigan	1–0	@ No. 20 UIC
September 30	Oregon State	2–0	@ No. 22 Washington
October 4	@ DePaul	3–1	No. 20 UIC
October 5	@ Washington	3–1	No. 22 San Diego State
October 6	@ Santa Clara	1–0	No. 7 Portland
October 6	@ Clemson	4–0	No. 21 Louisville
October 7	@ NJIT	1–0	No. 15 Vermont
October 7	Indiana	2–1	No. 19 Penn State
October 7	@ Rhode Island	1–0	No. 24 Fordham
October 9	Temple	2–1	@ No. 10 Syracuse
October 11	UC Irvine	2–1	@ No. 13 Cal State Fullerton
October 12	San Francisco	2–1	@ No. 9 Stanford
October 13	@ Virginia	2–1	No. 11 Pittsburgh
October 13	@ Penn State	2–1	No. 12 Northwestern
October 14	@ Providence	1–0	No. 3 Georgetown
October 14	@ Delaware	2–1	No. 18 Hofstra
October 14	@ Loyola Chicago	3–1	No. 25 Saint Louis
October 18	@ Creighton	3–2	No. 7 Akron
October 20	@ Florida Atlantic	2–1	No. 14 FIU
October 21	UMBC	2–1	@ No. 16 Vermont
October 22	Kentucky	2–0	@ No. 1 Marshall
October 22	Western Michigan	2–1	@ No. 10 Missouri State
October 24	Ohio State	3–2	@ No. 16 Michigan State
October 27	@ Kentucky	1–0	No. 2 West Virginia
October 28	@ Loyola Marymount	1–0	No. 9 Portland
October 31	James Madison	2–1	@ No. 1 UCF

=== Conference standings ===
2023 ACC men's soccer standings
	Conf.					Overall
Team	W		L		T	W		L		T
Atlantic
No. 15 Wake Forest +	4	–	1	–	3	11	–	3	–	5
No. 1 Clemson ‡	4	–	2	–	2	15	–	3	–	5
No. 25 Syracuse +	2	–	1	–	5	9	–	5	–	7
No. 24 Louisville +	2	–	4	–	2	12	–	6	–	3
NC State	1	–	5	–	2	6	–	9	–	3
Boston College	0	–	5	–	3	3	–	9	–	5
Coastal
No. 2 Notre Dame +	6	–	0	–	2	13	–	3	–	6
No. 13 Virginia +	5	–	2	–	1	11	–	4	–	4
No. 20 Duke+	4	–	3	–	1	11	–	4	–	3
No. 6 North Carolina +	2	–	3	–	3	11	–	3	–	7
Pittsburgh +	2	–	3	–	3	6	–	7	–	4
Virginia Tech	2	–	5	–	1	4	–	9	–	4
‡ – ACC tournament champion + – Also invited to the 2023 NCAA tournament; As of December 12, 2023; Rankings from United Soccer Coaches; Source: The ACC

2023 America East Conference men's soccer standings
	Conf.					Overall
Team	W		L		T	W		L		T
No. 9 New Hampshire +	4	–	0	–	3	13	–	3	–	4
Bryant ‡	4	–	1	–	2	16	–	2	–	2
UMBC	3	–	1	–	3	7	–	4	–	5
No. 14 Vermont +	4	–	3	–	0	13	–	6	–	2
NJIT	3	–	2	–	2	7	–	8	–	4
Binghamton	2	–	2	–	3	5	–	10	–	3
Albany	1	–	5	–	1	5	–	11	–	1
UMass Lowell	0	–	7	–	0	2	–	11	–	3
‡ – Tournament champion + – At-large invitation to the 2023 NCAA tournament; As of December 12, 2023; Rankings from United Soccer Coaches

2023 American Athletic Conference men's soccer standings
	Conf.					Overall
Team	W		L		T	W		L		T
No. 10 SMU +	7	–	0	–	1	14	–	3	–	2
Charlotte ‡	6	–	2	–	0	13	–	4	–	1
FIU +	5	–	1	–	2	10	–	5	–	4
Memphis +	4	–	4	–	0	11	–	6	–	2
South Florida	3	–	4	–	1	6	–	9	–	1
Florida Atlantic	3	–	5	–	0	6	–	8	–	3
Temple	2	–	4	–	2	3	–	8	–	4
Tulsa	2	–	5	–	1	4	–	8	–	3
UAB	0	–	7	–	1	0	–	11	–	4
‡ – AAC tournament champion + – At-large invitation to the 2023 NCAA tournament; As of December 12, 2023; Rankings from United Soccer Coaches; Source: The American

2023 ASUN Conference men's soccer standings
	Conf.					Overall
Team	W		L		T	W		L		T
Lipscomb ‡	6	–	1	–	0	10	–	4	–	4
Stetson	3	–	2	–	2	7	–	7	–	4
Bellarmine ^{#}	3	–	2	–	2	6	–	5	–	6
Jacksonville	2	–	2	–	3	5	–	9	–	3
Florida Gulf Coast	2	–	2	–	3	3	–	7	–	5
Central Arkansas	2	–	2	–	3	4	–	9	–	4
Queens ^{#}	3	–	4	–	0	5	–	10	–	2
North Florida	0	–	6	–	1	3	–	8	–	4
‡ – 2023 ASUN tournament champion + – At-large invitation to the 2023 NCAA tournament ^{#} – Ineligible for post-season (In transition); As of December 12, 2023; Rankings from United Soccer Coaches; Source: ASUN

2023 Atlantic 10 Conference men's soccer standings
	Conf.					Overall
Team	W		L		T	W		L		T
VCU	5	–	1	–	2	7	–	6	–	5
Loyola Chicago	4	–	1	–	3	8	–	2	–	5
Saint Louis	4	–	1	–	3	8	–	4	–	5
Davidson	5	–	3	–	0	10	–	5	–	1
Duquesne	4	–	2	–	2	8	–	7	–	3
Dayton ‡	3	–	1	–	4	8	–	7	–	6
UMass	4	–	3	–	1	7	–	6	–	6
Fordham	3	–	3	–	2	6	–	4	–	7
Rhode Island	2	–	4	–	2	5	–	6	–	5
Saint Joseph's	2	–	4	–	2	4	–	11	–	2
St. Bonaventure	2	–	5	–	1	6	–	7	–	4
George Mason	2	–	5	–	1	5	–	7	–	3
George Washington	2	–	5	–	1	4	–	9	–	4
La Salle	1	–	5	–	2	5	–	8	–	4
‡ – 2023 Atlantic 10 tournament champion + – At-large invitation to the 2023 NCAA tournament; As of December 12, 2023; Rankings from United Soccer Coaches; Source: Atlantic 10

2023 Big East Conference men's soccer standings
	Conf.					Overall
Team	W		L		T	W		L		T
East
No. 16 Georgetown +	6	–	1	–	1	13	–	3	–	3
Providence	4	–	2	–	2	8	–	6	–	3
St. John's	3	–	1	–	4	8	–	4	–	5
UConn	4	–	4	–	0	9	–	8	–	1
Seton Hall	3	–	4	–	1	8	–	6	–	3
Villanova	1	–	4	–	3	1	–	8	–	7
Midwest
Xavier ‡	4	–	1	–	3	9	–	4	–	6
Creighton	3	–	3	–	2	4	–	7	–	6
Akron	2	–	1	–	5	9	–	2	–	7
Butler	1	–	3	–	4	2	–	7	–	6
DePaul	1	–	4	–	3	3	–	7	–	5
Marquette	1	–	5	–	2	7	–	6	–	3
‡ – 2023 Big East tournament champion + – At-large invitation to the 2023 NCAA tournament; As of December 12, 2023; Rankings from United Soccer Coaches; Source: Big East

2023 Big South Conference men's soccer standings
	Conf.					Overall
Team	W		L		T	W		L		T
High Point ‡	6	–	0	–	1	10	–	4	–	5
UNC Asheville	4	–	2	–	1	10	–	5	–	3
Winthrop	3	–	2	–	2	4	–	11	–	2
Gardner–Webb	2	–	2	–	3	4	–	9	–	4
Presbyterian	2	–	3	–	2	5	–	8	–	3
Radford	2	–	4	–	1	3	–	11	–	3
USC Upstate	2	–	4	–	1	5	–	10	–	2
Longwood	1	–	5	–	1	6	–	6	–	3
‡ – 2023 Big South tournament champion + – At-large invitation to the 2023 NCAA tournament; As of December 12, 2023; Rankings from United Soccer Coaches; Source: Big South

2023 Big Ten Conference men's soccer standings
	Conf.						Overall
Team	W		L		T	PCT	W		L		T	PCT
No. 7 Indiana ‍†‍‡‍	4	–	2	–	2	.625	15	–	4	–	5	.729
Penn State ‍†‍‍	4	–	2	–	2	.625	10	–	4	–	5	.658
Michigan State ‍‍‍	3	–	1	–	4	.625	7	–	2	–	7	.656
Northwestern ‍‍‍	4	–	3	–	1	.563	10	–	4	–	3	.676
Michigan ‍‍‍	2	–	1	–	5	.563	5	–	5	–	7	.500
Wisconsin ‍‍‍	2	–	2	–	4	.500	6	–	5	–	6	.529
Ohio State ‍‍‍	3	–	4	–	1	.438	6	–	6	–	5	.500
Rutgers ‍‍‍	3	–	4	–	1	.438	5	–	8	–	3	.406
Maryland ‍‍‍	0	–	6	–	2	.125	4	–	8	–	3	.367
† – Conference champion ‡ – 2023 Big Ten tournament champion y – Invited to the 2023 NCAA Tournament; As of December 12, 2023; Rankings from United Soccer Coaches; Source: Big Ten

2023 Big West Conference men's soccer standings
	Conf.					Overall
Team	W		L		T	W		L		T
Cal State Fullerton	6	–	2	–	1	12	–	5	–	3
UC Irvine ‡	5	–	3	–	1	9	–	7	–	4
UC Santa Barbara	4	–	3	–	2	10	–	8	–	2
UC Davis	4	–	4	–	1	9	–	7	–	4
Cal Poly	3	–	3	–	3	5	–	8	–	4
UC Riverside	3	–	3	–	3	3	–	10	–	5
Cal State Bakersfield	3	–	4	–	2	7	–	5	–	5
UC San Diego ^{#}	3	–	5	–	1	4	–	11	–	3
CSUN	2	–	3	–	4	4	–	6	–	8
Sacramento State	1	–	4	–	4	4	–	10	–	4
‡ – 2023 Big West tournament champion + – At-large invitation to the 2023 NCAA tournament ^{#} – Ineligible for post-season (In transition); As of December 12, 2023; Rankings from United Soccer Coaches; Source: Big West

2023 Coastal Athletic Association men's soccer standings
	Conf.					Overall
Team	W		L		T	W		L		T
No. 17 Hofstra ‡	5	–	1	–	2	14	–	3	–	5
Monmouth	5	–	1	–	2	8	–	4	–	6
Stony Brook	4	–	1	–	3	6	–	6	–	5
Delaware	3	–	2	–	3	9	–	4	–	6
Drexel	3	–	2	–	3	9	–	2	–	5
Elon	3	–	3	–	2	6	–	8	–	4
Charleston	2	–	4	–	2	6	–	6	–	5
Campbell	2	–	4	–	2	4	–	6	–	4
UNC Wilmington	1	–	4	–	3	6	–	6	–	4
Northeastern	1	–	4	–	3	4	–	7	–	6
William & Mary	1	–	4	–	3	2	–	8	–	6
‡ – 2023 CAA tournament champion + – At-large invitation to the 2023 NCAA tournament; As of December 12, 2023; Rankings from United Soccer Coaches; Source: CAA

2023 Horizon League men's soccer standings
	Conf.					Overall
Team	W		L		T	W		L		T
Oakland	6	–	3	–	0	8	–	9	–	2
Green Bay ‡	5	–	2	–	2	10	–	4	–	5
IUPUI	4	–	2	–	3	7	–	7	–	5
Detroit Mercy	4	–	3	–	2	5	–	10	–	3
Purdue Fort Wayne	3	–	3	–	3	7	–	6	–	4
Wright State	3	–	4	–	2	4	–	9	–	5
Robert Morris	3	–	4	–	2	5	–	6	–	5
Cleveland State	2	–	3	–	4	3	–	8	–	5
Northern Kentucky	3	–	6	–	0	4	–	10	–	3
Milwaukee	2	–	5	–	2	4	–	9	–	4
‡ – 2023 Horizon tournament champion + – At-large invitation to the 2023 NCAA tournament; As of December 12, 2023; Rankings from United Soccer Coaches; Source: Horizon

2023 Ivy League men's soccer standings
	Conf.					Overall
Team	W		L		T	W		L		T
Penn	4	–	1	–	2	7	–	3	–	6
Yale ‡	3	–	1	–	3	11	–	6	–	3
Harvard	3	–	1	–	3	5	–	5	–	7
Brown	2	–	0	–	5	5	–	5	–	8
Cornell	2	–	2	–	3	8	–	4	–	3
Dartmouth	2	–	3	–	2	4	–	8	–	3
Princeton	1	–	4	–	2	4	–	8	–	3
Columbia	0	–	5	–	2	2	–	8	–	4
‡ – 2023 Ivy League tournament champion + – At-large invitation to the 2023 NCAA tournament; As of December 12, 2023; Rankings from United Soccer Coaches; Source: Ivy League

2023 Metro Atlantic Athletic Conference men's soccer standings
	Conf.					Overall
Team	W		L		T	W		L		T
Iona	9	–	1	–	0	12	–	4	–	0
Siena	8	–	2	–	0	8	–	9	–	0
Rider ‡	6	–	2	–	2	12	–	4	–	4
Manhattan	6	–	3	–	1	7	–	8	–	3
Niagara	4	–	4	–	2	4	–	10	–	3
Marist	4	–	4	–	2	6	–	8	–	3
Fairfield	3	–	6	–	1	6	–	9	–	1
Mount St. Mary's	2	–	6	–	2	2	–	10	–	3
Quinnipiac	1	–	5	–	4	3	–	9	–	5
Saint Peter's	1	–	6	–	3	2	–	9	–	5
Canisius	1	–	6	–	3	2	–	11	–	5
‡ – 2023 MAAC tournament champion + – At-large invitation to the 2023 NCAA tournament; As of December 12, 2023; Rankings from United Soccer Coaches; Source: MAAC

2023 Missouri Valley Conference men's soccer standings
	Conf.					Overall
Team	W		L		T	W		L		T
No. 24 Missouri State +	7	–	0	–	1	12	–	2	–	2
Drake	5	–	1	–	2	9	–	4	–	3
Bowling Green	4	–	3	–	1	10	–	5	–	2
No. 20 Western Michigan	3	–	1	–	4	11	–	1	–	6
Evansville ‡	4	–	3	–	1	8	–	6	–	3
UIC	3	–	5	–	0	7	–	9	–	0
Belmont	1	–	5	–	2	5	–	8	–	4
Bradley	1	–	5	–	2	4	–	8	–	4
Northern Illinois	1	–	6	–	1	3	–	12	–	1
‡ – 2023 MVC Tournament champion + – At-large invitation to the 2023 NCAA tournament; As of December 17, 2024; Rankings from United Soccer Coaches; Source: MVC

2023 Northeast Conference men's soccer standings
	Conf.					Overall
Team	W		L		T	W		L		T
Saint Francis (PA)	5	–	0	–	3	7	–	0	–	8
LIU ‡	5	–	1	–	2	10	–	6	–	3
Fairleigh Dickinson	4	–	1	–	3	8	–	5	–	5
Sacred Heart	3	–	2	–	3	6	–	8	–	5
Merrimack	3	–	3	–	2	5	–	7	–	4
Le Moyne ^{#}	2	–	3	–	3	2	–	8	–	7
Stonehill ^{#}	1	–	4	–	3	3	–	8	–	5
Central Connecticut	1	–	4	–	3	3	–	9	–	3
Howard	1	–	7	–	0	2	–	13	–	1
‡ – 2023 NEC tournament champion + – At-large invitation to the 2023 NCAA tournament ^{#} – Ineligible for post-season (In transition); As of December 12, 2023; Rankings from United Soccer Coaches; Source: NEC

2023 Ohio Valley Conference men's soccer standings
	Conf.					Overall
Team	W		L		T	W		L		T
SIU Edwardsville ‡	9	–	0	–	1	16	–	1	–	3
Incarnate Word	4	–	3	–	3	7	–	8	–	5
Liberty	4	–	4	–	2	9	–	6	–	3
Lindenwood ^{#}	3	–	3	–	4	7	–	7	–	6
Chicago State	3	–	4	–	3	5	–	10	–	4
Eastern Illinois	3	–	5	–	2	4	–	10	–	5
Houston Christian	2	–	4	–	4	4	–	8	–	6
Southern Indiana ^{#}	1	–	6	–	3	2	–	12	–	3
‡ – 2023 Ohio Valley tournament champion + – At-large invitation to the 2023 NCAA tournament ^{#} – Ineligible for NCAA tournament (In transition); As of December 12, 2023; Rankings from United Soccer Coaches; Source: OVC

2023 Pac-12 Conference men's soccer standings
	Conf.					Overall
Team	W		L		T	W		L		T
No. 21 UCLA †	6	–	0	–	4	9	–	4	–	5
No. 4 Oregon State +	4	–	1	–	5	11	–	6	–	5
California	3	–	4	–	3	7	–	6	–	5
No. 5 Stanford +	3	–	2	–	5	11	–	4	–	5
Washington	2	–	4	–	4	5	–	6	–	7
San Diego State	0	–	7	–	3	6	–	7	–	5
† – Conference champion + – At-large invitation to the 2023 NCAA tournament; As of December 12, 2023; Rankings from United Soccer Coaches; Source: Pac-12

2023 Patriot League men's soccer standings
	Conf.					Overall
Team	W		L		T	W		L		T
Boston University ‡	7	–	1	–	1	12	–	4	–	4
Loyola (MD)	6	–	1	–	2	7	–	3	–	8
Lafayette	4	–	2	–	3	9	–	6	–	6
Colgate	4	–	3	–	2	8	–	10	–	2
Navy	3	–	2	–	4	6	–	8	–	5
American	3	–	3	–	3	6	–	5	–	5
Holy Cross	2	–	5	–	2	5	–	10	–	3
Lehigh	2	–	5	–	2	3	–	10	–	5
Army	1	–	5	–	3	3	–	9	–	4
Bucknell	1	–	6	–	2	2	–	10	–	4
‡ – 2023 Patriot Tournament Champion + – At-large invitation to the 2023 NCAA tournament; As of December 12, 2023; Rankings from United Soccer Coaches; Source: Patriot League

2023 Southern Conference men's soccer standings
	Conf.					Overall
Team	W		L		T	W		L		T
ETSU	4	–	0	–	1	9	–	5	–	3
Wofford	3	–	0	–	2	7	–	4	–	6
Furman	2	–	2	–	1	10	–	6	–	3
Mercer ‡	1	–	2	–	2	7	–	6	–	8
UNC Greensboro	1	–	2	–	2	2	–	10	–	5
VMI	0	–	5	–	0	5	–	14	–	0
‡– 2023 SoCon tournament Champion + – At-large invitation to the 2023 NCAA tournament; As of December 12, 2023; Rankings from United Soccer Coaches; Source: SoCon

2023 Summit League men's soccer standings
	Conf.					Overall
Team	W		L		T	W		L		T
Denver +	6	–	0	–	1	12	–	3	–	5
Oral Roberts	4	–	1	–	2	10	–	4	–	3
Omaha ‡	3	–	2	–	2	8	–	8	–	4
Kansas City	2	–	2	–	3	4	–	8	–	6
St. Thomas (MN) ^{#}	0	–	5	–	2	3	–	10	–	3
Western Illinois	1	–	6	–	0	2	–	14	–	1
‡ – 2023 Summit tournament champion + – At-large invitation to the 2023 NCAA tournament ^{#} – Ineligible for post-season (In transition); As of December 12, 2023; Rankings from United Soccer Coaches; Source: Summit

2023 Sun Belt Conference men's soccer standings
	Conf.					Overall
Team	W		L		T	W		L		T
No. 8 Marshall ‡	7	–	2	–	0	18	–	3	–	0
No. 19 UCF +	6	–	2	–	1	10	–	4	–	2
No. 3 West Virginia +	5	–	1	–	3	17	–	3	–	4
No. 18 James Madison +	4	–	2	–	3	10	–	5	–	5
Kentucky +	3	–	3	–	3	8	–	8	–	4
Georgia State	3	–	4	–	2	6	–	7	–	5
South Carolina	3	–	4	–	2	6	–	9	–	3
Old Dominion	2	–	6	–	1	5	–	7	–	5
Georgia Southern	1	–	5	–	3	2	–	9	–	6
Coastal Carolina	1	–	6	–	2	3	–	9	–	3
‡ – 2023 Sun Belt Conference tournament champion + – At-large invitation to the 2023 NCAA tournament; As of December 12, 2023; Rankings from United Soccer Coaches; Source: Sun Belt

2023 West Coast Conference men's soccer standings
	Conf.					Overall
Team	W		L		T	W		L		T
San Diego †‡	5	–	1	–	1	11	–	4	–	4
Santa Clara †	5	–	1	–	1	7	–	7	–	3
No. 22 Portland +	5	–	2	–	0	12	–	5	–	0
Saint Mary's (CA)	3	–	4	–	0	8	–	7	–	2
San Francisco	2	–	3	–	2	8	–	4	–	5
No. 11 Loyola Marymount +	2	–	3	–	2	10	–	5	–	6
Pacific	1	–	5	–	1	5	–	8	–	4
Gonzaga	1	–	5	–	1	3	–	9	–	6
† – Conference champion ‡–Automatic qualifier to NCAA tournament + – At-large invitation to the 2023 NCAA tournament; As of December 12, 2023; Rankings from United Soccer Coaches; Source: WCC

2023 Western Athletic Conference men's soccer standings
	Conf.					Overall
Team	W		L		T	W		L		T
No. 23 Seattle U +	7	–	0	–	1	12	–	4	–	3
California Baptist ‡	5	–	1	–	2	9	–	6	–	5
Utah Tech ^{#}	4	–	4	–	0	9	–	9	–	0
UNLV	3	–	3	–	2	7	–	8	–	4
San Jose State	3	–	4	–	1	6	–	8	–	4
Utah Valley	2	–	2	–	4	3	–	7	–	7
Grand Canyon	2	–	4	–	2	7	–	7	–	3
UTRGV	2	–	5	–	1	5	–	9	–	1
Air Force	1	–	6	–	1	1	–	14	–	2
‡ – 2023 WAC tournament Champion + – At-large invitation to the 2023 NCAA tournament # – Ineligible (In transition); As of December 12, 2023; Rankings from United Soccer Coaches; Source: WAC

=== Early season tournaments ===
Several universities will host early season soccer tournaments.

Name	Date(s)	Host	Stadium	City	No. teams	Champion
Fairfield by Marriott Invitational	August 24–27	James Madison	Sentara Park	Harrisonburg, Virginia	4	James Madison
Wolstein Classic	August 24–27	Ohio State	Jesse Owens Memorial Stadium	Columbus, OH	4	UC Davis
John Rennie Invitational	August 25–27	Duke	Koskinen Stadium	Durham, NC	4	Duke
UAB Soccer for the Cure Classic	September 1–3	UAB	PNC Field	Birmingham, AL	4	Belmont & Chicago State
adidas/IU Credit Union Classic	September 1–4	Indiana	Bill Armstrong Stadium	Bloomington, IN	4	Washington

== Postseason ==
=== Conference winners and tournaments ===
Conference	Regular Season Champion(s)	Tournament Winner	Conference Tournament	Tournament Dates	Tournament Venue (City)
ACC	Atlantic – Wake Forest	Clemson	2023 tournament	November 1–11	All matches before final: Campus sites, hosted by higher seed Final: WakeMed Soccer Park • Cary, North Carolina
ACC	Coastal – Notre Dame	Clemson	2023 tournament	November 1–11	All matches before final: Campus sites, hosted by higher seed Final: WakeMed Soccer Park • Cary, North Carolina
America East	New Hampshire	Bryant	2023 tournament	November 4–12	Campus sites, hosted by higher seed
American	SMU	Charlotte	2023 tournament	November 5–12	Quarterfinals: Campus sites, hosted by higher seed Semifinals and final: Hosted by regular-season champion
ASUN	Lipscomb	Lipscomb	2023 tournament	November 4–11	Campus sites, hosted by higher seed
Atlantic 10	VCU	Dayton	2023 tournament	November 3–12	Campus sites, hosted by higher seed
Big East	East – Georgetown	Xavier	2023 tournament	November 4–12	Quarterfinals: Campus sites, hosted by higher seed Semifinals and final: Maryland SoccerPlex • Boyds, Maryland
Big East	Midwest – Xavier	Xavier	2023 tournament	November 4–12	Quarterfinals: Campus sites, hosted by higher seed Semifinals and final: Maryland SoccerPlex • Boyds, Maryland
Big South	High Point	High Point	2023 tournament	November 5–11	Campus sites, hosted by higher seed
Big Ten	Penn State & Indiana (Note: Top seed in conference tournament.)	Indiana	2023 tournament	November 3–12	Campus sites, hosted by higher seed
Big West	Cal State Fullerton	UC Irvine	2023 tournament	November 1–11	Campus sites, hosted by higher seed
CAA	Monmouth & Hofstra	Hofstra	2023 tournament	November 2–11	Quarterfinals and semifinals: Campus sites, hosted by top two seeds Final: Hosted by top remaining seed
Horizon	Oakland	Green Bay	2023 tournament	November 5–11	Quarterfinals: Campus sites, hosted by higher seed Semifinals and final: Hosted by regular-season champion
Ivy	Penn	Yale	2023 tournament	November 10–12	Campus sites, hosted by No. 1 seed
MAAC	Iona	Rider	2023 tournament	November 5–12	Campus sites, hosted by higher seed
Missouri Valley	Western Michigan	Western Michigan	2023 tournament	November 5–11	Quarterfinals: Campus sites, hosted by higher seed Semifinals and final: Hosted by regular-season champion
Northeast	Saint Francis	LIU	2023 tournament	November 5–12	Campus sites, hosted by higher seed
OVC	SIU Edwardsville	SIU Edwardsville	2023 tournament	November 5–11	Ralph Korte Stadium • Edwardsville, Illinois
Pac-12	UCLA		No tournament		
Patriot	Boston University	Boston University	2023 tournament	November 4–11	Campus sites, hosted by higher seed
SoCon	East Tennessee State	Mercer	2023 tournament	November 3–12	Quarterfinals and semifinals: Campus sites, hosted by top two seeds Final: Hosted by top remaining seed
The Summit	Denver	Omaha	2023 tournament	November 9–11	Case Soccer Complex • Tulsa, Oklahoma
Sun Belt	Marshall	Marshall	2023 tournament	November 5–12	Campus sites, hosted by higher seed
WAC	Seattle U	California Baptist	2023 tournament	November 5–11	Peter Johann Field • Paradise, Nevada
WCC	San Diego		No tournament		

== Awards and honors ==
=== TopDrawerSoccer.com Player/Team of the Week ===
- **Bold** denotes TDS Player of the Week.

TopDrawer Soccer Team of the Week
Week	Goalkeeper	Defenders	Midfielders	Forwards
Week 1 – August 28	Nate Crockford – Wisconsin	Luca Nikolai – James Madison; Bryce LeBel – Louisville; Kevin Bonilla – Portland; Trevor Dillon – San Diego	Jack Denton – Missouri State; Nick Pariano – Duke; **Zach Bohane** – Stanford	Sam Donnellan – Delaware; Matthew Bell – Marshall; Lineker Santos – Memphis

=== All-America teams ===
**2023 United Soccer Coaches All-America Teams**
First Team	Second Team	Third Team
Bryan Dowd, GK, Notre Dame; Kevin Bonilla, DF, Portland; Morris Duggan, DF, Marshall; Garrison Tubbs, DF, Wake Forest; Mads Westergren, DF, SMU; Yannick Bright, MF, New Hampshire; Eliot Goldthorp, MF, Hofstra; Jono Nyandjo, MF, UNC Charlotte; Matthew Bell, FW, Marshall; Charlie Sharp, FW, Western Michigan; Tyrese Spicer, FW, Lipscomb; Ousmane Sylla, FW, Clemson	Cole Johnson, GK, SMU; Kenny Nielsen, DF, Georgetown; Kieran Sargeant, DF, Georgetown; Jaylen Shannon, DF, Western Michigan; Sam Bassett, MF, Denver; Bailey Sparks, MF, SMU; Mason Tunbridge, MF, San Diego; Foster Ajago, FW, Duke; Marcus Caldeira, FW, West Virginia; Ryan Carmichael, FW, Hofstra; Jelldrik Dallmann, FW, SMU; Jason Shokalook, FW, Akron	Joseba Incera, GK, New Hampshire; Javier Armas, DF, Oregon State; Hesron Barry, DF, Wisconsin-Green Bay; Pierce Infuso, DF, Hofstra; Nick Fernandez, MF, Portland; Tucker Lepley, MF, UCLA; Taimu Okiyoshi, MF, Marshall; Logan Farrington, FW, Oregon State; Stephen Annor Gyamfi, FW, Virginia; Quenzi Huerman, FW, North Carolina; Lineker Rodrigues dos Santos, FW, Memphis; Samuel Sarver, FW, Indiana; Yutaro Tsukada, FW, West Virginia

=== Major player of the year awards ===
- Hermann Trophy: Ousmane Sylla – Clemson
- TopDrawerSoccer.com National Player of the Year Award: Bryan Dowd – Notre Dame

=== Other major awards ===
- United Soccer Coaches College Coach of the Year: Chad Riley
- Bill Jeffrey Award: Becky Burleigh
- Jerry Yeagley Award: Rob Stone
- Mike Berticelli Award: Rob Herringer
- NCAA Tournament MVP:Ousmane Sylla (Offensive) Pape Mar Boye (Defensive)

=== Conference players and coaches of the year ===
Conference	Conference Player of the Year	Offensive Player of the Year (Note: Honorees are forwards unless otherwise indicated.)	Defensive Player of the Year (Note: Honorees are defenders unless otherwise indicated.)	Midfielder of the Year	Goalkeeper of the Year	Rookie of the Year	Coach of the Year
ACC	—N/a	Forster Ajago, Duke	Garrison Tubbs, Wake Forest	Jeorgio Kocevski, Syracuse & Mouhameth Thiam, Virginia	Bryan Dowd, Notre Dame	Stephen Annor Gyamfi, F, Virginia (Note: This conference's award is "Freshman of the Year" and restricted to players of that classification.)	Chad Riley, Notre Dame
America East	—N/a	Taylor Calheira, UMBC (Note: This conference's award is styled as "Striker of the Year".)	Cameron Briggs, New Hampshire (Note: This conference's award is styled as "Defender of the Year".)	Yannick Bright, New Hampshire	Joseba Incera, New Hampshire	Nick Lockermann, DF, Vermont	New Hampshire (head coach: Marc Hubbard) (Note: The top coaching award in this conference is styled as "Coaching Staff of the Year" and presented to an entire staff, although the head coach is personally cited in the award announcement. The American Athletic Conference and Missouri Valley Conference cite each member of the winning staff individually.)
American	—N/a	Lineker Rodrigues dos Santos, Memphis	Mads Westergren, SMU	Bailey Sparks, SMU	Cole Johnson, SMU	Niv Berkowitz, MF, SMU	SMU (head coach: Kevin Hudson)
ASUN	Tyrese Spicer, F, Lipscomb	—N/a	Brock Pope, Bellarmine	—N/a	Matthew Brozovich, Bellarmine	Xavi Csato, F, Stetson	Charles Morrow, Lipscomb
Atlantic 10	—N/a	Alec Hughes, UMass	Diego Konincs, Saint Louis	Ask Ekeland, Duquesne	Aidan Crawford, Loyola Chicago	Andrey Salmeron, MF, VCU	Dave Giffard, VCU
Big East	—N/a	Jason Shokalook, Akron	Kenny Nielsen, Georgetown	Giorgio Probo, Creighton & Marlon Tabora, Georgetown	Ryan Schewe, Georgetown	Kieran Chandler, DF, UConn & Noeh Hernandez, MF, DePaul	Georgetown (head coach: Brian Wiese)
Big Ten	—N/a	Peter Mangione, Penn State	Femi Awodesu, Penn State	Lawrence Wootton, Maryland	Kris Shakes, Penn State	Kimani Stewart-Baynes, F, Maryland	Jeff Cook, Penn State
Big South	—N/a	Jefferson Amaya, MF, High Point	Finn McRobb, High Point	—N/a	Charlie Farrar, UNC Asheville	Freshman: Victor Faaborg Christensen, F, Presbyterian; Newcomer: Damorney Hutchinson, F, Presbyterian (Note: This conference presents separate awards for Freshman of the Year and Newcomer of the Year. The latter is open to any player in his first season of conference competition, regardless of academic classification.)	Zach Haines, High Point
Big West	—N/a	Roberto Ordonez, Cal State Fullerton	Giovanni Calderon, Cal State Fullerton	Errick Serrano, Cal State Fullerton	Tetsuya Kadono, Cal State Fullerton	Jorge Solorzano, MF, Cal State Northridge	George Kuntz, Cal State Fullerton
CAA	Eliot Goldthorp, MF, Hofstra	—N/a	Youri Senden, Drexel	—N/a	—N/a	Richard Monath, MF, Delaware	Ryan Anatol, Stony Brook
Horizon	Lukas Hackaa, MF, IUPUI	Mikey Ketteman, Oakland	Hesron Barry, Green Bay	—N/a	Tobias Jahn, Green Bay	Donavan Phillip, F, Oakland	Jeremy Bonomo, Green Bay & Eric Pogue, Oakland
Ivy	—N/a	Alessandro Arlotti, Harvard	TJ Presthus, Yale	—N/a	—N/a	Alex Harris, F, Cornell	Brian Gill, Penn
MAAC	—N/a	Camil Azzam Ruiz, Iona (Note: The MAAC's award in this category is styled as "Golden Boot".)	Tim Timchenko, Iona	—N/a	Nacho Alfaro Monge, Iona (Note: The MAAC's award in this category is styled as "Golden Glove".)	Saad Chaouki, F, Rider	James Hamilton, Iona
Missouri Valley	Dylan Sing, F, Western Michigan	Dylan Sing, Western Michigan (Note: This conference's award is styled as "Forward of the Year".)	Jaylen Shannon, Western Michigan	Jack Denton, Missouri State	Ethan Brandt, Western Michigan	Tyler Caton, MF, Missouri State	Western Michigan (head coach: Chad Wiseman)
Northeast	Emil Jaaskelainen, F, LIU	—N/a	Tom Schellbach, Saint Francis	—N/a	Jordaine Jäger, Saint Francis	Joshua Saavedra, MF, LIU	Saint Francis (head coach: Mads Keiser)
OVC	—N/a	Stephan Moreira, SIUE	Will Harris, SIUE	D'Alessandro Herrera, Houston Christian	Sam Gomez, SIUE	Ryan Okerayi, F, Houston Christian	Cale Wassermann, SIUE
Pac-12	Logan Farrington, F, Oregon State	Logan Farrington, Oregon State	Wyatt Meyer. DF/MF, California	—N/a	—N/a	Reid Fisher, DF, San Diego State	Leonard Griffin, California
Patriot	—N/a	Eitan Rosen, Boston University	Griffin Roach, Boston University	David Jackson, Navy	Francesco Montali, Boston University	Chris Ogor, DF, Loyola (MD)	Kevin Nylen, Boston University
SoCon	Tarik Pannholzer, F, ETSU & Nikolai Rojel, F, Wofford	—N/a	—N/a	—N/a	Cole Hunter, ETSU	Barzee Blama, F, Mercer	David Lilly, ETSU & Joel Tyson, Wofford
Summit	—N/a	Luis Flores, Oral Roberts	Jason Belloli, Denver	Sam Bassett, Denver	Isaac Nehme, Denver	Luis Flores, F, Oral Roberts	Jamie Franks, Denver
Sun Belt	Matthew Bell, F, Marshall	Matthew Bell, Marshall	Morris Duggan, Marshall	—N/a	Gabriel Perrotta, Marshall	Freshman: Saku Heiskanen, MF, UCF; Newcomer: Clarence Awoudor, F, UCF	Scott Calabrese, UCF
WAC	—N/a	James Morris, Seattle	Thomas Beecham, California Baptist	—N/a	Charlie Lanphier, Seattle	Drew Hardin, MF, California Baptist	Nate Daligcon, Seattle
WCC	—N/a	Mason Tunbridge, MF, San Diego	Kevin Bonilla, Portland	Nick Fernandez, Portland	Eric Waltz, San Francisco	Efetobo Aror, MF, Portland	Cameron Rast, Santa Clara

== See also ==
- College soccer in the United States
- 2023 NCAA Division I women's soccer season
- List of NCAA Division I men's soccer programs
- 2023 in American soccer
