= 2023 Marshall Thundering Herd men's soccer team =

College soccer season

2023 Marshall Thundering Herd men's soccer

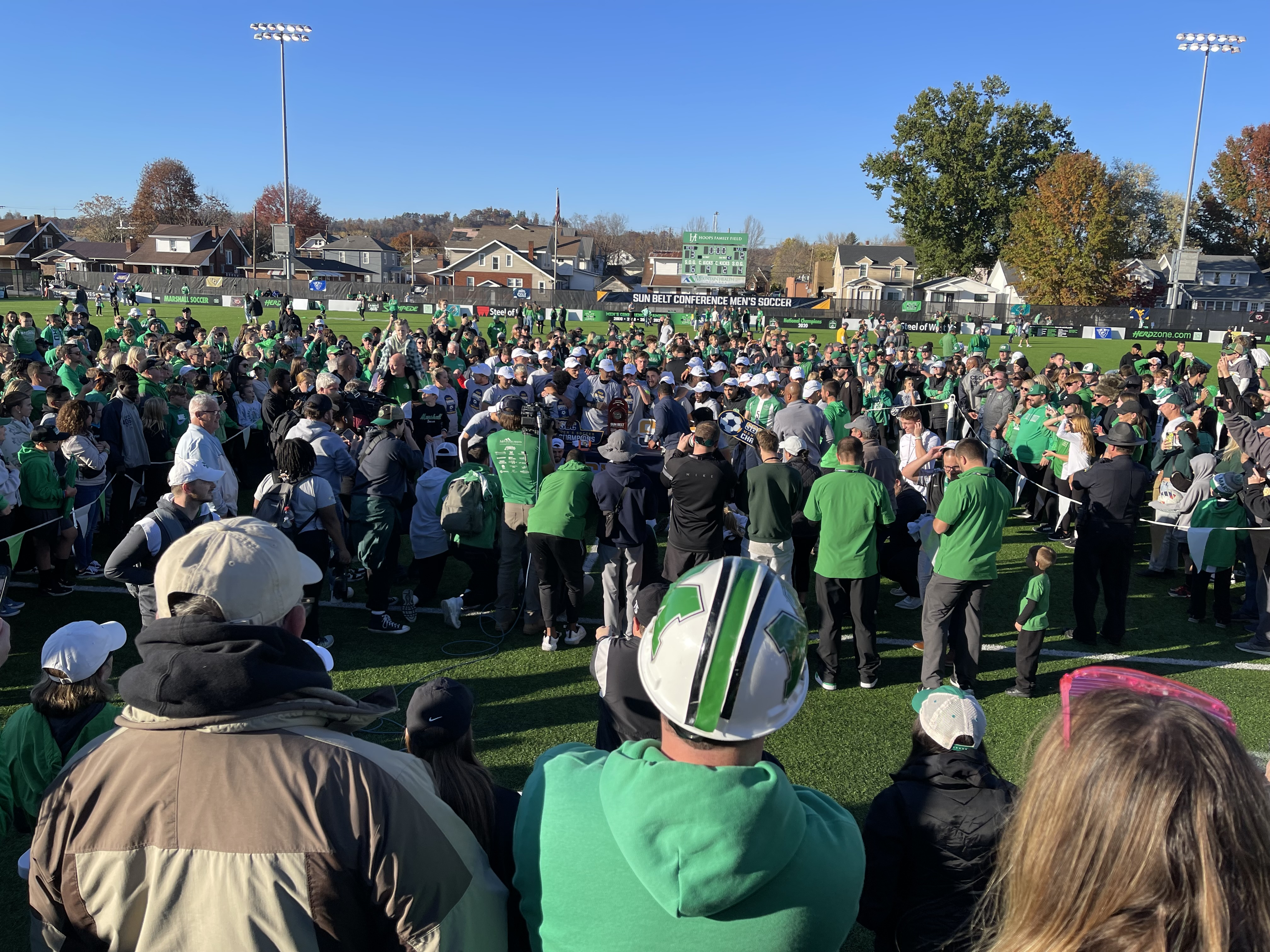
- Marshall fans celebrate winning the Sun Belt men’s soccer tournament championship

Sun Belt regular season champions Sun Belt Tournament champions
- Conference: Sun Belt Conference
- U. Soc. Coaches poll: No. 1
- TopDrawerSoccer.com: No. 1
- Record: 18–2–0 (7–2–0 Sun Belt)
- Head coach: Chris Grassie (7th season)
- Assistant coaches: Josh Faga (5th season); Rafa Simoes (3rd season)
- Home stadium: Hoops Family Field

The 2023 Marshall Thundering Herd men's soccer team represented Marshall University during the 2023 NCAA Division I men's soccer season. It was the 45th season of the university fielding a men's varsity soccer program. The Thundering Herd, led by seventh-year head coach Chris Grassie, played their home games at Hoops Family Field as members of the Sun Belt Conference.

2023 Sun Belt Conference men's soccer standings
	Conf.					Overall
Team	W		L		T	W		L		T
No. 8 Marshall ‡	7	–	2	–	0	18	–	3	–	0
No. 19 UCF +	6	–	2	–	1	10	–	4	–	2
No. 3 West Virginia +	5	–	1	–	3	17	–	3	–	4
No. 18 James Madison +	4	–	2	–	3	10	–	5	–	5
Kentucky +	3	–	3	–	3	8	–	8	–	4
Georgia State	3	–	4	–	2	6	–	7	–	5
South Carolina	3	–	4	–	2	6	–	9	–	3
Old Dominion	2	–	6	–	1	5	–	7	–	5
Georgia Southern	1	–	5	–	3	2	–	9	–	6
Coastal Carolina	1	–	6	–	2	3	–	9	–	3
‡ – 2023 Sun Belt Conference tournament champion + – At-large invitation to the 2023 NCAA tournament; As of December 12, 2023; Rankings from United Soccer Coaches; Source: Sun Belt

The Thundering Herd finished the regular season with a 14–2–0 record winning the Sun Belt Conference men's soccer regular season championship. This marked the first team championship Marshall has won in the Sun Belt Conference. The 14–2–0 record also marks the best regular season Marshall men's soccer has ever had.

Marshall continued their dominance into the Sun Belt Conference tournament where they got revenge on the two teams that defeated them in the regular season; Kentucky, and West Virginia. They ultimately won the Sun Belt tournament with a score of 3–2 against fierce rival West Virginia to clinch a spot in the NCAA tournament. This also marked the first tournament championship

Marshall made school history on November 13, 2023 as they laid claim to the No.1 overall seed in the NCAA men's soccer tournament during the selection show. Despite being the top seed overall, they lost in the third round to Stanford.

== Background ==
The season prior, Marshall finished 11-4-4 after losing in the third round of the 2022 NCAA Division I men's soccer tournament.

Marshall was ranked 11th in the United Soccer Coaches preseason poll and 2nd in the Sun Belt Conference preseason poll.

== Roster ==
Updated August, 2023

Note: Flags indicate national team as defined under FIFA eligibility rules; some limited exceptions apply. Players may hold more than one non-FIFA nationality.

No.	Pos.	Nation	Player
1	GK	IRL	Dan Rose
4	DF	ENG	Alex Bamford
5	MF	USA	Ryan Holmes
6	MF	BRA	Guga Veiga
7	FW	FRA	Adam Aoumaich
8	MF	JPN	Taimu Okiyoshi
9	FW	ESP	Álvaro García Pascual
10	FW	JAM	Matthew Bell
11	MF	ESP	Pablo Simon
12	DF	BRA	Joao Roberto
13	DF	USA	Ethan Prescott
15	DF	JPN	Takahiro Fujita
16	DF	BRA	Felipe Santos
17	MF	BRA	Filipe Short
18	FW	ARG	Agustin Iusem

No.	Pos.	Nation	Player
19	MF	USA	Nikola Sljivic
20	MF	DEN	Alex Stjernegaard
21	MF	FRA	Theo Godard
24	DF	GHA	Mohammed Seidu
25	DF	GER	Morris Duggan
27	MF	MAR	Aymane Sordo
29	GK	USA	Gabe Sitler
31	DF	POR	Rai Pinto
32	MF	JPN	Masaya Sekiguchi
38	GK	DEN	Paul Weincierz
43	DF	BRA	Braian Amaro
44	FW	GHA	Alexander Adjetey
47	MF	USA	Marco Silva
49	FW	FRA	Illias Aoumaich
99	GK	PAR	Gabriel Perrotta

== Goal Scorers ==
Rank	Player	Goals
1	Matthew Bell	10
2	Alvaro Garcia-Pascual	8
3	Marco Silva	7
3	Pablo Simon	7
5	Adam Aoumaich	5
6	Alexander Adjetey	4
6	Aymane Sordo	4
8	Braian Amaro	2
8	Morris Duggan	2
9	Theo Godard	1
9	Agustin Iusem	1
9	Taimu Okiyoshi	1
9	Rai Pinto	1
9	Joao Roberto	1
9	Alexander Stjernegaard	1

== Schedule ==
Date Time, TV	Rank^{#}	Opponent^{#}	Result	Record	Site (Attendance) City, State
Regular season
August 24*; 7:15 pm, ESPN+	No. 11	Oakland	W 4–0	1–0–0	Hoops Family Field (1,492); Huntington, WV
August 28*; 7:15 pm, ESPN+	No. 11	Wright State	W 5–0	2–0–0	Hoops Family Field (1,135); Huntington, WV
September 1*; 7:15 pm, ESPN+	No. 5	Xavier	W 3–0	3–0–0	Hoops Family Field (1,713); Huntington, WV
September 5*; 6:00 pm, ACCN	No. 2	at Pittsburgh	W 3–1	4–0–0	Petersen Sports Complex (1,081); Pittsburgh, PA
September 8*; 7:15 am, ESPN+	No. 2	High Point	W 2–1	5–0–0	Hoops Family Field (2,135); Huntington, WV
September 12*; 7:15 pm, ESPN+	No. 2	Cleveland State	W 5–0	6–0–0	Hoops Family Field (1,579); Huntington, WV
September 16; 7:00 pm, ESPN+	No. 2	at No. 9 James Madison	W 3–1	7–0–0 (1–0–0)	Sentara Park (1,119); Harrisonburg, VA
September 23; 7:15 pm, ESPN+	No. 1	No. 3 UCF	W 1–0	8–0–0 (2–0–0)	Hoops Family Field (3,075); Huntington, WV
September 27*; 7:00 pm, ESPN+	No. 1	at VCU	W 1–0	9–0–0	Sports Backers Stadium (995); Richmond, VA
October 1; 7:00 pm, ESPN+	No. 1	at Georgia Southern	W 3–1	10–0–0 (3–0–0)	Eagle Field (391); Statesboro, GA
October 7; 7:15 pm, ESPN+	No. 1	Georgia State	W 2–0	11–0–0 (4–0–0)	Hoops Family Field (2,042); Huntington, WV
October 13; 7:15 pm, ESPN+	No. 1	Coastal Carolina	W 6–1	12–0–0 (5–0–0)	Hoops Family Field (1,861); Huntington, WV
October 18; 7:00 pm, ESPN+	No. 1	at No. 5 West Virginia; Mountain State Derby	L 2–5	12–1–0 (5–1–0)	Dick Dlesk Soccer Stadium (3,147); Morgantown, WV
October 22; 4:30 pm, ESPM+	No. 1	Kentucky	L 0–2	12–2–0 (5–2–0)	Hoops Family Field (3,099); Huntington, WV
October 27; 7:00 pm, ESPN+	No. 6	at Old Dominion	W 2–0	13–2–0 (6–2–0)	Old Dominion Soccer Complex (548); Norfolk, VA
October 31; 7:15 pm, ESPN+	No. 4	South Carolina	W 2–0	14–2–0 (7–2–0)	Hoops Family Field (1,714); Huntington, WV
Sun Belt Tournament
November 5; 3:00 pm, ESPN+	(1) No. 4	(8) Old Dominion; Quarterfinals	W 2–0	15–2–0	Hoops Family Field (1,790); Huntington, WV
November 8; 7:00 pm, ESPN+	(1) No. 1	(5) Kentucky; Semifinals	W 3–0	16–2–0	Hoops Family Field (2,176); Huntington, WV
November 12; 1:00 pm, ESPN+	(1) No. 1	(3) No. 5 West Virginia; Finals	W 3–2	17–2–0	Hoops Family Field (3,151); Huntington, WV
NCAA Tournament
November 19*; 1:00 pm, ESPN+	(1) No. 1	Cal Baptist; Second round	W 3–0	18–2–0	Hoops Family Field (2,959); Huntington, WV
November 26*; 1:00 pm, ESPN+	(1) No. 1	(16) No. 22 Stanford; Third round	L 3–0	18–3–0	Hoops Family Field (3,042); Huntington, WV
*Non-conference game. ^{#}Rankings from United Soccer Coaches. (#) Tournament seedings in parentheses.

== Awards and honors ==
Recipient	Award	Date	Ref.
Matthew Bell	SBC Offensive Player of the Week	Aug. 29	
Marco Silva	SBC Offensive Player of the Week	Sept. 5	
Matthew Bell	SBC Offensive Player of the Week	Sept. 19	
Adam Aoumaich	SBC Offensive Player of the Week	Sept. 26	
Pablo Simon	SBC Offensive Player of the Week	Oct. 17	
Alexander Stjernegaard	SBC Offensive Player of the Week	Nov. 2	
Gabriel Perrotta	SBC Defensive Player of the Week	Nov. 2	
Matthew Bell	SBC Player of the Year	Nov. 3	
Matthew Bell	SBC Offensive Player of the Year	Nov. 3	
Morris Duggan	SBC Defensive Player of the Year	Nov. 3	
Gabriel Perrotta	SBC Goalkeeper Player of the Week	Nov. 3	
Matthew Bell	SBC First-Team All-Conference	Nov. 3	
Morris Duggan	SBC First-Team All-Conference	Nov. 3	
Gabriel Perrotta	SBC First-Team All-Conference	Nov. 3	
Taimu Okiyoshi	SBC Second-Team All-Conference	Nov. 3	

== Rankings ==
Ranking movements Legend: ██ Increase in ranking ██ Decrease in ranking ( ) = First-place votes
	Week															
Poll	Pre	1	2	3	4	5	6	7	8	9	10	11	12	13	14	Final
United Soccer	11	5	2	2 (3)	1 (7)	1 (8)	1 (7)	1 (7)	1 (8)	6	4	1 (8)	N/A			
Top Drawer Soccer	9	6	2	2	1	1	1	1	1	6	6	3	1			
