= 2023 American Athletic Conference men's soccer tournament =

- Classification: Division I
- Teams: 6
- Matches: 5
- Attendance: 3,661
- First round site: Top Seed Campus Site
- Semifinals site: Westcott Field; Dallas, Texas
- Finals site: Westcott Field; Dallas, Texas
- Champions: Charlotte (1st title)
- Winning coach: Kevin Langan (1st title)
- MVP: Jelldrik Dallmann (Offensive); Ian Pilcher (Defensive) (SMU; Charlotte)
- Broadcast: ESPN+

2023 American Athletic Conference men's soccer standings
	Conf.					Overall
Team	W		L		T	W		L		T
No. 10 SMU +	7	–	0	–	1	14	–	3	–	2
Charlotte ‡	6	–	2	–	0	13	–	4	–	1
FIU +	5	–	1	–	2	10	–	5	–	4
Memphis +	4	–	4	–	0	11	–	6	–	2
South Florida	3	–	4	–	1	6	–	9	–	1
Florida Atlantic	3	–	5	–	0	6	–	8	–	3
Temple	2	–	4	–	2	3	–	8	–	4
Tulsa	2	–	5	–	1	4	–	8	–	3
UAB	0	–	7	–	1	0	–	11	–	4
‡ – AAC tournament champion + – At-large invitation to the 2023 NCAA tournament; As of December 12, 2023; Rankings from United Soccer Coaches; Source: The American

The 2023 American Athletic Conference men's soccer tournament was the postseason men's soccer tournament for the American Athletic Conference held November 5 through November 12, 2023. The five-match tournament took place at campus sites, with the higher seed hosting while the Semifinals and Finals were hosted at Westcott Field in Dallas, Texas. The six-team single-elimination tournament consisted of three rounds based on seeding from regular season conference play.The defending champions were the FIU Panthers. The Panthers were unable to defend their title, falling to Florida Atlantic in the First Round. Charlotte would go on to win the tournament title over SMU in the final 2–1. This was Charlotte's first American Athletic Conference tournament title as they joined the league in 2022. It was their third conference title overall. This was also the first American tournament title for head coach Kevin Langan and his second conference tournament title overall. As tournament champions Charlotte earned the American Athletic Conference's automatic berth into the 2023 NCAA Division I men's soccer tournament.

== Seeding ==
The top six teams in the regular season earned a spot in the tournament, with the top two seeds receiving byes into the Semifinals. No tiebreakers were required as all teams finished with a unique number of conference regular season points.

Seed	School	Conference Record	Points
1	SMU	7–0–1	22
2	Charlotte	6–2–0	18
3	FIU	5–1–2	17
4	Memphis	4–4–0	12
5	South Florida	3–4–1	10
6	Florida Atlantic	3–5–0	9

== Bracket ==
First Round; November 6
3	FIU	0
6	Florida Atlantic	1
4	Memphis	3
5	South Florida	2

Semifinals; November 10
2	Charlotte	3
6	Florida Atlantic	1
1	SMU	3
4	Memphis	0

Championship; November 13
2	Charlotte	2
1	SMU	1

== Schedule ==
=== First Round ===
November 5	#3 FIU	0–1	#6 Florida Atlantic	Westchester, FL
7:00 p.m.	Joao Domingues (yellow card) 40'; Team (yellow card) 40'	Report	(yellow card) 40' Team; (yellow card) 56' Sebastian Zettl; (yellow card) 79' Graeme Pratt; 90' Noah Kvifte	Stadium: FIU Soccer Stadium; Attendance: 1,007

November 5	#4 Memphis	3–2	#5 South Florida	Memphis, TN
7:00 p.m.	Alberto Cruz 16'; Jackson Kim (yellow card) 32'; Robbie Baker (yellow card) 38'; South Florida Own Goal 86'; Logan Longo 89'	Report	13' Pedro Faife; (yellow card) 33' Segun Afolabi; 38' Max Wilkins	Stadium: Murphy Soccer Complex; Attendance: 204; Referee: Michael Lavergne; Assistant referees: Austin Holt; Michael Mysiewicz

=== Semifinals ===
November 9	#2 Charlotte	3–1	#6 Florida Atlantic	Dallas, TX
3:30 p.m.	Jonathan Nyandjo 34' (pen.); Brigham Larsen 51'; Daniel Moore (yellow card) 59'; Riyon Tori 90'	Report	50' Arthur Widiez; (yellow card) 61' Chadi Mayati; (yellow card) 87' Leo Keller	Stadium: Westcott Field; Referee: Austin Saini; Assistant referees: Ryan Starr; Albert Kyei-Mensah; Fourth official: Justin St. Pierre

November 9	#1 SMU	3–0	#4 Memphis	Dallas, TX
7:00 p.m.	Jelldrik Dallmann 25', 52', 61'; JP Jordan (yellow card) 41'; Kyran Chambron Pinho (yellow card) 80'	Report	(yellow card) 55' Jackson Kim; (yellow card) 88' Elie Bokota	Stadium: Westcott Field; Attendance: 400; Referee: Kevin Maurer; Assistant referees: John Ocampo; Albert Escovar; Fourth official: Justin St. Pierre

=== Final ===
November 12	#1 SMU	1–2	#2 Charlotte	Dallas, TX
1:00 p.m.	Niv Berkovitz (yellow card) 23'; Jelldirk Dallmann 25' (pen.); Harvey Castro (yellow card) 26'; Chance Johnson (yellow card) 54'	Report	(yellow card) 15' Riyon Tori; 23' Ian Pilcher; (yellow card) 25' Daniel Moore; 55' Brandon Morales; (yellow card) 61' Logan Frost; (yellow card) 74' Abubacarr Fofana; (yellow card) 78' Filip Jauk	Stadium: Westcott Field; Attendance: 2,050; Referee: Justin St. Pierre; Assistant referees: Albert Escovar; Albert Kyei-Mensah; Fourth official: Kevin Maurer

== Statistics ==
=== Goalscorers ===
There were 16 goals scored in 5 matches, for an average of 3.2 goals per match (as of November 12, 2023).

4 goals

- Jelldrik Dallmann – SMU

1 goal

- Brigham Larsen – Charlotte
- Brandon Morales – Charlotte
- Jonathan Nyandjo – Charlotte
- Ian Pilcher – Charlotte
- Riyon Tori – Charlotte
- Noah Kvifte – Florida Atlantic
- Arthur Widiez – Florida Atlantic
- Alberto Cruz – Memphis
- Logan Longo – Memphis
- Pedro Faife – South Florida
- Max Wilkins – South Florida

1 own goal

- South Florida (vs. Memphis)

== All-Tournament team ==
Player	Team
Bringham Larsen	Charlotte
Brandon Morales	Charlotte
Ian Pilcher	Charlotte
Jonathan Nyandjo	Charlotte
Leo Stritter	Charlotte
Arthur Widiez	Florida Atlantic
Alberto Cruz	Memphis
Niv Berkovitz	SMU
Kyran Chambron Pinho	SMU
**Jelldrik Dallmann**	SMU
Mads Westergren	SMU

Offensive MVP in bold
Defensive MVP in italics
