= 2023 Sun Belt Conference men's soccer season =

- League: NCAA Division I
- Sport: Soccer
- Duration: August 24, 2023 - October 31, 2023
- Teams: 10

2024 MLS SuperDraft
- Top draft pick: Matthew Bell, 16th overall
- Picked by: Real Salt Lake

Regular Season
- Season champions: Marshall
- Season MVP: Offensive:Matthew Bell; Defensive:Morris Duggan; Goalkeeper:Gabriel Perrotta
- Top scorer: Marcus Caldeira (12); Yutaro Tsukada (12)

Tournament
- Champions: Marshall
- Runners-up: West Virginia
- Finals MVP: Álvaro García Pascual

Sun Belt Conference men's soccer seasons
- ← 2022 2024 →

2023 Sun Belt Conference men's soccer standings
	Conf.					Overall
Team	W		L		T	W		L		T
No. 8 Marshall ‡	7	–	2	–	0	18	–	3	–	0
No. 19 UCF +	6	–	2	–	1	10	–	4	–	2
No. 3 West Virginia +	5	–	1	–	3	17	–	3	–	4
No. 18 James Madison +	4	–	2	–	3	10	–	5	–	5
Kentucky +	3	–	3	–	3	8	–	8	–	4
Georgia State	3	–	4	–	2	6	–	7	–	5
South Carolina	3	–	4	–	2	6	–	9	–	3
Old Dominion	2	–	6	–	1	5	–	7	–	5
Georgia Southern	1	–	5	–	3	2	–	9	–	6
Coastal Carolina	1	–	6	–	2	3	–	9	–	3
‡ – 2023 Sun Belt Conference tournament champion + – At-large invitation to the 2023 NCAA tournament; As of December 12, 2023; Rankings from United Soccer Coaches; Source: Sun Belt

The 2023 Sun Belt Conference men's soccer season will the 21st season of men's varsity soccer in the Sun Belt Conference (SBC), as part of the 2023 NCAA Division I men's soccer season.

== Previous season ==
Kentucky won both the Sun Belt Conference regular season and tournament championship, marking the first time they have won either of the Sun Belt titles. It was Kentucky's seventh overall regular season championship and their sixth overall tournament championship. Kentucky earned the Sun Belt's automatic berth into the 2022 NCAA Division I men's soccer tournament, and Marshall earned an at-large bid. Kentucky was the top-overall seeded team in the entire tournament while Marshall was unseeded. Both teams reached the third round (Sweet 16) of the NCAA tournament before being eliminated.

Milo Yosef of Marshall was named the SBC Player of the Year. Oliver Semmle of Marshall was the first Sun Belt player to be selected in the 2023 MLS SuperDraft, being drafted in the second round with the 41st overall pick by the Colorado Rapids.

== Teams ==
=== Stadiums and locations ===
Team	Location	Stadium	Capacity
Coastal Carolina Chanticleers	Conway, South Carolina	Coastal Carolina University Soccer Field	1,000
Georgia Southern Eagles	Statesboro, Georgia	Eagle Field	3,500
Georgia State Panthers	Decatur, Georgia	GSU Soccer Complex	1,892
James Madison Dukes	Harrisonburg, Virginia	Sentara Park	1,500
Kentucky Wildcats	Lexington, Kentucky	Wendell & Vickie Bell Soccer Complex	3,368
Marshall Thundering Herd	Huntington, West Virginia	Veterans Memorial Soccer Complex	1,006
Old Dominion Monarchs	Norfolk, Virginia	Old Dominion Soccer Complex	4,000
South Carolina Gamecocks	Columbia, South Carolina	Stone Stadium	5,700
UCF Knights	Orlando, Florida	UCF Soccer and Track Stadium	2,000
West Virginia Mountaineers	Morgantown, West Virginia	Dick Dlesk Soccer Stadium	1,600

=== Coaches ===
Lee Squires was hired in December 2022 to become the Head Coach of the Georgia Southern Eagles. Note: All stats current through the completion of the 2022 season

Team	Head coach	Previous job	Years at school	Overall record	Record at school	SBC record	Ref.
Coastal Carolina	Shaun Docking	Charleston Southern	26	326–167–52 (.646)	306–148–50 (.657)	19–8–6 (.667)	
Georgia Southern	Lee Squires	Lander	0	140–56–26 (.689)	0–0–0 (–)	0–0–0 (–)	
Georgia State	Brett Surrency	Georgia State (asst.)	14	135–92–16 (.588)	135–92–16 (.588)	25–13–5 (.640)	
James Madison	Paul Zazenski	James Madison (asst.)	6	– (–)	– (–)	– (–)	
Kentucky	Johan Cedergren	Dartmouth (asst.)	12	– (–)	– (–)	– (–)	
Marshall	Chris Grassie	Charleston (WV)	7	166–52–26 (.734)	67–32–18 (.650)	4–1–3 (.688)	
Old Dominion	Alan Dawson	North Carolina (asst.)	26	– (–)	– (–)	– (–)	
South Carolina	Tony Annan	Atlanta United Academy	3	– (–)	– (–)	– (–)	
UCF	Scott Calabrese	FIU	6	– (–)	– (–)	0–0–0 (–)	
West Virginia	Dan Stratford	Charleston (WV)	4	– (–)	– (–)	– (–)	

== Preseason ==
=== Preseason poll ===
The preseason poll will be released in late August 2023.

SBC preseason poll
Predicted finish	Team	Votes (1st place)
1	Kentucky	93 (6)
2	Marshall	91 (2)
3	West Virginia	77 (1)
4	UCF	68 (1)
5	South Carolina	49
6T	Coastal Carolina	45
6T	Georgia State	45
8	James Madison	40
9	Old Dominion	26
10	Georgia Southern	16

=== Preseason national polls ===
The preseason national polls were released in July and August 2023.

	United; Soccer	Top Drawer; Soccer
Coastal Carolina	—	—
Georgia Southern	—	—
Georgia State	—	—
James Madison	—	—
Kentucky	3 (1)	6
Marshall	11	9
Old Dominion	—	—
South Carolina	—	—
UCF	—	—
West Virginia	—	—

=== Preseason awards ===
==== All−American Teams ====
USC 1st Team	USC 2nd Team	TDS 1st Team	TDS 2nd Team	CSN 1st Team	CSN 2nd Team

==== Preseason All SBC ====
Position	Player	Class	School
Goalkeeper	Casper Mols	So.	Kentucky
Defender	Anderson Rosa	Sr.	UCF
Defender	Max Miller	So.	Kentucky
Defender	Morris Duggan	Sr.	Marshall
Midfielder	Gavin Williams	So.	Georgia State
Midfielder	Alex Karkowiak	R-Jr.	James Madison
Midfielder	Eythor Kjartansson	So.	Coastal Carolina
Midfielder	Andrew Erickson	Sr.	Kentucky
Forward	Casper Grening	Jr.	Kentucky
Forward	Lucca Dourado	Sr.	UCF
Forward	Simon Carlson	Sr.	Georgia State
Forward	Matthew Bell	So.	Marshall

== Regular season ==
=== National rankings ===
	Improvement in ranking
	Drop in ranking
NR	Not Ranked

		Pre	Wk 1	Wk 2	Wk 3	Wk 4	Wk 5	Wk 6	Wk 7	Wk 8	Wk 9	Wk 10	Wk 11	Wk 12	Wk 13	Wk 14	Wk 15	Final
Coastal Carolina	USC	NR	NR	NR	NR	NR	NR	NR	NR	NR	NR	NR	NR	None released				NR
Coastal Carolina	TDS	NR	NR	NR	NR	NR	NR	NR	NR	NR	NR	NR	NR	NR	NR	NR	NR	NR
Georgia Southern	USC	NR	NR	NR	NR	NR	NR	NR	NR	NR	NR	NR	NR	None released				NR
Georgia Southern	TDS	NR	NR	NR	NR	NR	NR	NR	NR	NR	NR	NR	NR	NR	NR	NR	NR	NR
Georgia State	USC	NR	NR	NR	NR	NR	NR	NR	NR	NR	NR	NR	NR	None released				NR
Georgia State	TDS	NR	NR	NR	NR	NR	NR	NR	NR	NR	NR	NR	NR	NR	NR	NR	NR	NR
James Madison	USC	NR	17	8	9	12	NR	NR	NR	NR	NR	NR	NR	None released				18
James Madison	TDS	NR	NR	NR	24	NR	NR	NR	NR	NR	NR	NR	NR	13	13	14	14	14
Kentucky	USC	3	2	19	24	NR	NR	NR	NR	NR	NR	NR	NR	None released				NR
Kentucky	TDS	6	5	9	11	25	NR	NR	NR	NR	NR	NR	NR	NR	NR	NR	NR	NR
Marshall	USC	11	5	2	2	1	1	1	1	1	6	4	1	None released				8
Marshall	TDS	9	6	2	2	1	1	1	1	1	6	6	3	1	1	9	9	9
Old Dominion	USC	NR	NR	NR	NR	NR	NR	NR	NR	NR	NR	NR	NR	None released				NR
Old Dominion	TDS	NR	NR	NR	NR	NR	NR	NR	NR	NR	NR	NR	NR	NR	NR	NR	NR	NR
South Carolina	USC	NR	NR	NR	NR	NR	NR	NR	NR	NR	NR	NR	NR	None released				NR
South Carolina	TDS	NR	NR	NR	NR	NR	NR	NR	NR	NR	NR	NR	NR	NR	NR	NR	NR	NR
UCF	USC	NV	13	6	5	3	3	2	2	2	1	1	12	None released				19
UCF	TDS	NR	NR	17	15	4	3	2	2	2	2	1	9	14	21	21	21	21
West Virginia	USC	NR	NR	16	4	2	4	3	7	5	2	7	5	None released				3
West Virginia	TDS	NR	NR	NR	10	2	7	4	10	6	1	4	2	2	2	1	1	3

== Awards ==
2023 Sun Belt Men's Soccer Individual Awards
Award	Recipient(s)
Coach of the Year	Scott Calabrese – UCF
Offensive Player of the Year	Matthew Bell – Marshall
Defensive Player of the Year	Morris Duggan – Marshall
Goalkeeper of the Year	Gabriel Perrotta – Marshall
Newcomer of the Year	Saku Heiskanen – UCF
Freshman of the Year	Saku Heiskanen – UCF

2023 Sun Belt Men's Soccer All-Conference Teams
First Team	Second Team
Player – School; Player - School etc	Player - School; Player - School

== MLS SuperDraft ==
The 2024 MLS SuperDraft was held on December 19, 2023.

=== Total picks by school ===
Team	Round 1	Round 2	Round 3	Comp.	Total
Coastal Carolina	0	0	0	0	0
Georgia State	0	0	0	0	0
Georgia Southern	0	0	0	0	0
James Madison	0	0	0	0	0
Kentucky	0	0	1	0	1
Marshall	1	0	1	0	2
Old Dominion	0	0	0	0	0
South Carolina	0	0	0	0	0
UCF	0	1	0	0	1
West Virginia	3	0	0	0	3

=== List of selections ===
Round	Pick #	MLS team	Player	Position	College	Nationality	Ref.
1	16	Real Salt Lake	Matthew Bell	FW	Marshall	(Jamaica)	
1	20	Minnesota United FC	Marcus Caldeira	FW	West Virginia	(Canada)	
1	25	Orlando City SC	Yutaro Tsukada	FW	West Virginia	(Japan)	
1	28	Los Angeles FC	Jackson Lee	GK	West Virginia	(Australia)	
2	43	Colorado Rapids	Anderson Rosa	DF	UCF	(Brazil)	
3	67	Minnesota United FC	Morris Duggan	DF	Marshall	(Germany)	
3	77	Atlanta United FC	Casper Mols	GK	Kentucky	(Denmark)	
