= 2023 West Virginia Mountaineers men's soccer team =

American college soccer season

2023 West Virginia Mountaineers men's soccer

NCAA Tournament, College Cup
- Conference: Sun Belt Conference
- U. Soc. Coaches poll: No. 5
- TopDrawerSoccer.com: No. 4
- Record: 17–3–4 (5–1–3 SBC)
- Head coach: Dan Stratford (4th season)
- Associate head coach: Andy Wright (8th season)
- Assistant coach: Nick Noble (7th season)
- Home stadium: Dick Dlesk Soccer Stadium

2023 Sun Belt Conference men's soccer standings
| | Conf. | | | | | Overall |
| Team | W | | L | | T | W | | L | | T |
|---|---|---|---|---|---|---|---|---|---|---|
| No. 8 Marshall ‡ | 7 | – | 2 | – | 0 | 18 | – | 3 | – | 0 |
| No. 19 UCF + | 6 | – | 2 | – | 1 | 10 | – | 4 | – | 2 |
| No. 3 West Virginia + | 5 | – | 1 | – | 3 | 17 | – | 3 | – | 4 |
| No. 18 James Madison + | 4 | – | 2 | – | 3 | 10 | – | 5 | – | 5 |
| Kentucky + | 3 | – | 3 | – | 3 | 8 | – | 8 | – | 4 |
| Georgia State | 3 | – | 4 | – | 2 | 6 | – | 7 | – | 5 |
| South Carolina | 3 | – | 4 | – | 2 | 6 | – | 9 | – | 3 |
| Old Dominion | 2 | – | 6 | – | 1 | 5 | – | 7 | – | 5 |
| Georgia Southern | 1 | – | 5 | – | 3 | 2 | – | 9 | – | 6 |
| Coastal Carolina | 1 | – | 6 | – | 2 | 3 | – | 9 | – | 3 |
‡ – 2023 Sun Belt Conference tournament champion + – At-large invitation to the 2023 NCAA tournament; As of December 12, 2023; Rankings from United Soccer Coaches; Source: Sun Belt

The 2023 West Virginia Mountaineers men's soccer team represented West Virginia University during the 2023 NCAA Division I men's soccer season. They were led by head coach Dan Stratford, in his fourth season. They played their home games at Dick Dlesk Soccer Stadium. This was the team's 63rd season playing organized men's college soccer and their second playing in the Sun Belt Conference.

== Previous season ==
The 2022 West Virginia team posted a 7–7–4 (3–1–4 Sun Belt) record. They were eliminated in the semifinals of the 2022 Sun Belt Conference men's soccer tournament and did not earn an at-large berth into the 2022 NCAA Division I men's soccer tournament.

== Preseason ==
=== Coaches poll ===
The coaches poll was released on August 14, 2023.

Coaches' Poll
| Predicted finish | Team | Points |
|---|---|---|
| 1 | Kentucky | 93 (6) |
| 2 | Marshall | 91 (2) |
| 3 | West Virginia | 77 (1) |
| 4 | UCF | 68 (1) |
| 5 | South Carolina | 49 |
| T–6 | Georgia State | 45 |
| T–6 | Coastal Carolina | 45 |
| 8 | James Madison | 40 |
| 9 | Old Dominion | 26 |
| 10 | Georgia Southern | 16 |

== Personnel ==
=== Roster ===
Note: Flags indicate national team as defined under FIFA eligibility rules; some limited exceptions apply. Players may hold more than one non-FIFA nationality.

| No. | Pos. | Nation | Player |
|---|---|---|---|
| 1 | GK | AUS | Jackson Lee |
| 2 | DF | USA | Ryan Vaubel |
| 3 | DF | DEN | Frederik Jorgensen |
| 4 | DF | CAN | Brayden Borutskie |
| 5 | DF | ENG | Max Broughton |
| 6 | MF | NED | Dyon Dromers |
| 7 | FW | CAN | Marcus Caldeira |
| 8 | MF | FIN | Otto Ollikainen |
| 9 | FW | USA | Sam Nyenka |
| 10 | MF | ENG | Ryan Crooks |
| 11 | MF | ENG | Luke McCormick |
| 12 | FW | USA | Luke Lenz |
| 13 | FW | USA | Jake Ross |
| 14 | MF | USA | Barrett Saul |
| 15 | DF | USA | Sam Clark |

| No. | Pos. | Nation | Player |
|---|---|---|---|
| 16 | MF | USA | Max Trethewey |
| 17 | FW | JPN | Yutaro Tsukada |
| 18 | GK | USA | Marc Bonnaire |
| 19 | MF | GER | Kasimir Lauber |
| 20 | DF | ESP | Sergio Ors Navarro |
| 21 | MF | CYP | Constantinos Christou |
| 23 | MF | USA | Ryan Baer |
| 25 | DF | USA | Dante Huckaby |
| 26 | DF | USA | Kyle Lehnert |
| 27 | DF | USA | Noah Gold |
| 29 | MF | USA | Andrew O'Neill |
| 30 | GK | USA | Lorenzo Nunez |
| 30 | DF | ESP | Carlos Hernando |
| 33 | DF | FRA | Thomas Decottignies |

=== Coaching ===
2024 West Virginia Mountaineers men's soccer coaching staff
| Name | Position | Seasons at WVU | Alma mater |
|---|---|---|---|
| Dan Stratford | Head coach | 4 | West Virginia University (2007) |
| Andy Wright | Associate Head Coach | 8 | West Virginia University (2007) |
| Nick Noble | Assistant Coach | 7 | West Virginia University (2006) |
| Ross Holland | Director of Operations | 2 | University of Charleston (2016) |
| Tanner Kolb | Strength & Conditioning Coach | 6 | Oklahoma State University (2007) |
| Ethan Solger | Athletic Trainer | 3 | University of Florida (2012) |

== Competitions ==
=== Exhibitions ===
| August 12 | College of Charleston | v | West Virginia | Charleston, SC |
| 7:30 PM EST | | | | Stadium: Patriots Point Soccer Complex |

| August 15 | Radford | v | West Virginia | Radford, VA |
| 7:30 PM EST | | | | Stadium: Patrick D. Cupp Stadium |

| August 19 | West Virginia | v | Charleston (WV) | Morgantown, WV |
| 7:30 PM EST | | | | Stadium: Dick Dlesk Soccer Stadium |

=== Regular season ===
| August 24 1 | West Virginia | 3–0 | California Baptist | Morgantown, WV |
| 7:30 PM EST | | | | Stadium: Dick Dlesk Soccer Stadium |

| August 28 2 | West Virginia | 2–0 | Bucknell | Morgantown, WV |
| 7:30 PM EST | | | | Stadium: Dick Dlesk Soccer Stadium |

| September 1 3 | Yale | 0–2 | West Virginia | New Haven, CT |
| 7:30 PM EST | | | | Stadium: Reese Stadium |

| September 5 4 | American | 1–2 | West Virginia | Washington, DC |
| 7:30 PM EST | | | | Stadium: Reeves Field |

| September 9 5 | West Virginia | 1–0 | Portland | Morgantown, WV |
| 7:30 PM EST | | | | Stadium: Dick Dlesk Soccer Stadium |

| September 15 6 | UCF | 2–2 | West Virginia | Orlando, FL |
| 7:30 PM EST | | | | Stadium: UCF Soccer and Track Stadium |

| September 19 7 | West Virginia | 1–0 | Dayton | Morgantown, WV |
| 7:30 PM EST | | | | Stadium: Dick Dlesk Soccer Stadium |

| September 22 8 | West Virginia | 0–0 | Georgia Southern | Morgantown, WV |
| 7:30 PM EST | | | | Stadium: Dick Dlesk Soccer Stadium |

| September 26 9 | UNCG | 1–2 | West Virginia | Greensboro, NC |
| 7:30 PM EST | | | | Stadium: UNCG Soccer Stadium |

| September 30 10 | Georgia State | 3–4 | West Virginia | Atlanta, GA |
| 7:30 PM EST | | | | Stadium: GSU Soccer Field |

| October 4 11 | West Virginia | 1–1 | Loyola (MD) | Morgantown, WV |
| 7:30 PM EST | | | | Stadium: Dick Dlesk Soccer Stadium |

| October 8 12 | West Virginia | 2–2 | James Madison | Morgantown, WV |
| 7:30 PM EST | | | | Stadium: Dick Dlesk Soccer Stadium |

| October 12 13 | South Carolina | 2–3 | West Virginia | Columbia, SC |
| 7:30 PM EST | | | | Stadium: Eugene E. Stone III Stadium |

| October 18 14 | West Virginia | 5–2 | Marshall | Morgantown, WV |
| 7:30 PM EST | | | | Stadium: Dick Dlesk Soccer Stadium |

| October 22 15 | Coastal Carolina | 0–2 | West Virginia | Conway, SC |
| 7:30 PM EST | | | | Stadium: CCU Soccer Field |

| October 27 16 | Kentucky | 1–0 | West Virginia | Lexington, KY |
| 7:30 PM EST | | | | Stadium: Bell Soccer Complex |

| October 31 17 | West Virginia | 2–1 | Old Dominion | Morgantown, WV |
| 7:30 PM EST | | | | Stadium: Dick Dlesk Soccer Stadium |

=== Sun Belt tournament ===
| November 5 Quarterfinals | ^{(3)} West Virginia | 3–1 | ^{(6)} Georgia State | Orlando, FL |
| 7:30 PM EST | | | | Stadium: UCF Soccer and Track Stadium |

| November 8 Semifinals | ^{(3)} West Virginia | 2–0 | ^{(7)} South Carolina | Orlando, FL |
| 7:30 PM EST | | | | Stadium: UCF Soccer and Track Stadium |

| November 12 Final | ^{(1)} Marshall | 3–2 | ^{(3)} West Virginia | Huntington, WV |
| 7:30 PM EST | | | | Stadium: Hoops Family Field |

=== NCAA tournament ===
| November 19 Second round | ^{(5)} West Virginia | 1–0 | Louisville | Morgantown, WV |
| 7:30 PM EST | | | | Stadium: Dick Dlesk Soccer Stadium |

| November 25 Third round | ^{(5)} West Virginia | 2–1 | Vermont | Morgantown, WV |
| 7:30 PM EST | | | | Stadium: Dick Dlesk Soccer Stadium |

| December 2 Quarterfinals | ^{(5)} West Virginia | 3–1 | Loyola Marymount | Morgantown, WV |
| 7:30 PM EST | | | | Stadium: Dick Dlesk Soccer Stadium |

| December 8 Semifinals | ^{(5)} West Virginia | 0–1 | ^{(9)} Clemson | Louisville, KY |
| 7:30 PM EST | | | | Stadium: Lynn Family Stadium |
