= 2023 UCF Knights men's soccer team =

College soccer season

2023 UCF Knights men's soccer

NCAA Tournament, Second Round
- Conference: Sun Belt Conference
- Record: 10–4–2 (6–2–1 Sun Belt)
- Head coach: Scott Calabrese (7th season)
- Home stadium: UCF Soccer and Track Stadium

The 2023 UCF Knights men's soccer team represented University of Central Florida in the 2023 NCAA Division I men's soccer season. It is the Knights' first season playing in the Sun Belt Conference.

2023 Sun Belt Conference men's soccer standings
	Conf.					Overall
Team	W		L		T	W		L		T
No. 8 Marshall ‡	7	–	2	–	0	18	–	3	–	0
No. 19 UCF +	6	–	2	–	1	10	–	4	–	2
No. 3 West Virginia +	5	–	1	–	3	17	–	3	–	4
No. 18 James Madison +	4	–	2	–	3	10	–	5	–	5
Kentucky +	3	–	3	–	3	8	–	8	–	4
Georgia State	3	–	4	–	2	6	–	7	–	5
South Carolina	3	–	4	–	2	6	–	9	–	3
Old Dominion	2	–	6	–	1	5	–	7	–	5
Georgia Southern	1	–	5	–	3	2	–	9	–	6
Coastal Carolina	1	–	6	–	2	3	–	9	–	3
‡ – 2023 Sun Belt Conference tournament champion + – At-large invitation to the 2023 NCAA tournament; As of December 12, 2023; Rankings from United Soccer Coaches; Source: Sun Belt

The Knights were given an At-Large bid to the NCAA Tournament as the twelfth seed. However, they were upset by unranked Vermont 3-2 after 2 overtime periods.

== Background ==
In 2022 UCF played their final season as an American Athletic Conference team and finished the season 6-7.

It was announced in 2021 that UCF would join the Big 12 Conference in 2023, however, the Big 12 does not support men's soccer. On June 21, 2022 UCF announced they would join the Sun Belt Conference for men's soccer starting with the 2023 season.

== Squad information ==
=== Roster ===
Note: Flags indicate national team as defined under FIFA eligibility rules; some limited exceptions apply. Players may hold more than one non-FIFA nationality.

No.	Pos.	Nation	Player
1	GK	USA	Luciano Natoli
2	DF	USA	Zane Bubb
3	DF	FRA	Raphael Crivello
4	MF	GER	Jonas Fritschi
5	MF	SEN	Ousmane Ba
6	DF	BRA	Anderson Rosa
7	FW	SEN	Mouhamed Pouye
8	MF	USA	Beto Ydrach
9	FW	BRA	Lucca Dourado
10	FW	FRA	Clarence Awoudor
11	FW	SEN	Malang Mandiang
12	MF	USA	Robbie Soronellas
13	DF	ISR	Ron Ben Dakon

No.	Pos.	Nation	Player
14	FW	POR	Fabio Guerreiro
15	MF	FIN	Saku Heiskanen
16	DF	CRC	Timothy Arias
17	MF	NZL	Oscar Hough
18	MF	FRA	Yanis Belatrache
20	DF	CRC	Brandon Calderon
21	FW	GHA	Emmanuel Bam
22	MF	USA	Drew Hansen
23	DF	GER	Arne Michaelis
24	MF	USA	AJ Seals
26	GK	USA	Shane Wright
27	GK	COL	Pablo Ossabal
28	FW	USA	Junior Trucillo
29	FW	USA	Joey Mueller
30	MF	ISR	Itai Levisman
31	GK	ESP	Juanvi Muñoz

=== Coaching staff ===
Position	Name
Head coach	Scott Calabrese
Associate Head Coach	Paul Souders
Associate Head Coach	Jamie Davies
Goalkeeper Coach	Devala Gorrick
Director of Operations	Carter Sadin
Athletic Trainer	Elisabeth Bird
Assistant Director of Sports Performance	Joe Howard

== Schedule ==
Date Time, TV	Rank^{#}	Opponent^{#}	Result	Record	Site (Attendance) City, State
Exhibition
August 12*; 7:00 p.m.		at Jacksonville	W		UCF Soccer and Track Complex; Orlando, FL
August 17*; 7:00 p.m.		at South Florida; War on I-4	L 0-2		Corbett Stadium; Tampa, FL
Regular season
August 24*; 7:00 p.m.		at No. 9 Clemson	W 2-1	1-0-0	Riggs Field (4,090); Clemson, SC
August 27*; 8:00 p.m.		Stetson	W 2-1	2-0-0	UCF Soccer and Track Complex (593); Orlando, FL
September 1*; 7:00 p.m.	No. 14	NC State	W 3-1	3-0-0	UCF Soccer and Track Complex (397); Orlando, FL
September 5*; 7:00 p.m.	No. 6	No. 11 FIU	T 2-2	3-0-1	UCF Soccer and Track Complex (618); Orlando, FL
September 9*; 7:00 p.m.	No. 6	Brown	W 2-0	4-0-1	UCF Soccer and Track Complex (581); Orlando, FL
September 15; 7:00 p.m.	No. 5	No. 4 West Virginia; Big 12 Derby	T 2-2	4-0-2 (0–0–1)	UCF Soccer and Track Complex (1,061); Orlando, FL
September 23; 7:15 p.m.	No. 3	at No. 1 Marshall	L 0-1	4-1-2 (0–1–1)	Hoops Family Field (3,075); Huntington, WV
September 29; 5:00 p.m.		at Kentucky; Big 12 / SEC Challenge			Vickie Bell Soccer Complex; Lexington, KY
October 7; 7:00 p.m.		Georgia Southern			UCF Soccer and Track Stadium; Orlando, FL
October 14; 7:00 p.m.		at Old Dominion			Old Dominion Soccer Complex; Norfolk, VA
October 18; 7:00 p.m.		Coastal Carolina			UCF Soccer and Track Stadium; Orlando, FL
October 22; 6:00 p.m.		at South Carolina; Big 12 / SEC Challenge			Eugene E. Stone III Stadium; Columbia, SC
October 27; 7:00 p.m.		at Georgia State			GSU Soccer Field; Atlanta, GA
October 31; 7:00 p.m.		James Madison			UCF Soccer and Track Stadium; Orlando, FL
*Non-conference game. ^{#}Rankings from United Soccer Coaches. (#) Tournament seedings in parentheses.

== Rankings ==
Ranking movements Legend: ██ Increase in ranking ██ Decrease in ranking — = Not ranked
	Week															
Poll	Pre	1	2	3	4	5	6	7	8	9	10	11	12	13	14	Final
United Soccer	—	14	6	5	3											
