= Álvaro García Pascual =

Spanish footballer (born 2002)

Personal information
- Full name: Álvaro Miguel García Pascual
- Date of birth: 21 July 2002 (age 24)
- Place of birth: Benalmádena, Spain
- Height: 1.91 m (6 ft 3 in)
- Position: Forward

Team information
- Current team: Cádiz
- Number: 23

Youth career
- 2016–2017: Atlético Benamiel
- 2017–2018: 26 de Febrero
- 2018–2019: Black Rock
- 2020–2021: Vázquez Cultural

College career
Years	Team	Apps	(Gls)
2021–2022	Coastal Carolina Chanticleers	17	(10)
2023–2024	Marshall Thundering Herd	14	(8)

Senior career*
Years	Team	Apps	(Gls)
2024–2025	Sevilla B	27	(8)
2024–2025	Sevilla	8	(1)
2025–	Cádiz	40	(4)
- * Club domestic league appearances and goals as of 9 June 2026

Álvaro Miguel García Pascual (born 1 January 2002) is a Spanish professional footballer who plays as a forward for Cádiz CF.

== Career ==
=== Early career ===
Born in Benalmádena, Málaga, Andalusia, García Pascual played for local sides Atlético Benamiel CF and CD 26 de Febrero before moving to the United States in 2018, with Black Rock FC. He returned to his home country in 2020, playing for the Juvenil side of CD Vázquez Cultural.

=== College ===
In 2021, García Pascual moved back to the US, joining Coastal Carolina University's Coastal Carolina Chanticleers, where he was named to the 2021 All-Conference USA second team and the C-USA All-Freshman Team. He was also named to the 2022 Sun Belt Conference Men's Soccer All-Sun Belt Team, before moving to Marshall University's Marshall Thundering Herd in August 2023.

García Pascual was named MVP of the 2023 Sun Belt Conference, being also the MVP of the finals.

=== Sevilla ===
On 4 July 2024, García Pascual joined Sevilla FC, being initially assigned to the C-team. He spent the pre-season with the reserves, and became a regular starter for the side afterwards.

Initially included in the main squad call-up after the suspension of Isaac Romero, García Pascual made his professional – and La Liga – debut on 14 December 2024, coming on as a half-time substitute for Kelechi Iheanacho a 1–0 home win over RC Celta de Vigo. He scored his first goal in the category the following 13 May, netting the winner in a 1–0 home success over UD Las Palmas.

=== Cádiz ===
On 4 July 2025, García Pascual signed a three-year contract with Cádiz CF in Segunda División.
