= 2023 Sun Belt Conference men's soccer tournament =

American college soccer postseason tournament

- Classification: Division I
- Teams: 8
- Matches: 7
- Site: Huntington, WV; Orlando, FL
- Champions: Marshall (1st title)
- Winning coach: Chris Grassie (1st title)
- MVP: Álvaro García Pascual (Marshall)
- Broadcast: ESPN+

2023 Sun Belt Conference men's soccer standings
	Conf.					Overall
Team	W		L		T	W		L		T
No. 8 Marshall ‡	7	–	2	–	0	18	–	3	–	0
No. 19 UCF +	6	–	2	–	1	10	–	4	–	2
No. 3 West Virginia +	5	–	1	–	3	17	–	3	–	4
No. 18 James Madison +	4	–	2	–	3	10	–	5	–	5
Kentucky +	3	–	3	–	3	8	–	8	–	4
Georgia State	3	–	4	–	2	6	–	7	–	5
South Carolina	3	–	4	–	2	6	–	9	–	3
Old Dominion	2	–	6	–	1	5	–	7	–	5
Georgia Southern	1	–	5	–	3	2	–	9	–	6
Coastal Carolina	1	–	6	–	2	3	–	9	–	3
‡ – 2023 Sun Belt Conference tournament champion + – At-large invitation to the 2023 NCAA tournament; As of December 12, 2023; Rankings from United Soccer Coaches; Source: Sun Belt

The 2023 Sun Belt Conference men's soccer tournament was the 28th edition of the Sun Belt Conference men's soccer tournament. The tournament ran from November 5 to November 12, 2023. Marshall won the Sun Belt Conference (SBC) tournament and with it the SBC's automatic bid to the NCAA Division I National Tournament.

The conference announced the top two seeds would host the quarterfinals and semifinal rounds, and then the highest remaining seed in the finals would host the finals. #1 seed Marshall and #2 seed UCF earned the right to host the first two rounds of the tournament.

== Seeds ==
Seed	School	Conference	Points
1	Marshall	7–2–0	21
2	UCF	6–2–1	19
3	West Virginia	5–1–3	18
4	James Madison	4–2–3	15
5	Kentucky	3–3–3	12
6	Georgia State	3–4–2	11
7	South Carolina	3–4–2	11
8	Old Dominion	2–6–1	7

== Bracket ==
Quarterfinals
1	Marshall	2
8	Old Dominion	0
4	James Madison	1
5	Kentucky	2
2	UCF	1
7	South Carolina	2
3	West Virginia	3
6	Georgia State	1

Semifinals
Marshall	3
Kentucky	0
South Carolina	0
West Virginia	2

Finals
Marshall	3
West Virginia	2

== Schedule ==
=== Quarterfinals ===
November 5, 2023
3:00 PM EST

#1 Marshall Thundering Herd	2–0	#8 Old Dominion Monarchs
Pablo Simon 60'; Agustin Iusem 85'	Report

Hoops Family Field, Huntington, WV
Attendance: 1790
Referee: Michael Nickerson

November 5, 2023
3:00 PM EST

#3 West Virginia Mountaineers	3–1	#6 Georgia State Panthers
Luke McCormick 56'; Yutaro Tsukada 69', 76'	Report	Ethan Sassine 51'

UCF Soccer and Track Stadium, Orlando, FL

November 5, 2023
7:00 PM EST

#4 James Madison Dukes	1–2	#5 Kentucky Wildcats
Rodrigo Robles 27'	Report	Mason Visconti 26'; Ben Damge 54'

Hoops Family Field, Huntington, WV
Attendance: 333
Referee: Sorin Stoica

November 5, 2023
7:00 PM EST

#2 UCF Knights	1–2	#7 South Carolina Gamecocks
Anderson Rosa 56'	Report	Harrison Myring 6'; Jack Burgess 24'

UCF Soccer and Track Stadium, Orlando, FL
Attendance: 816
Referee: Madzid Coric

=== Semifinals ===
November 8, 2023
7:00 PM EDT

#1 Marshall Thundering Herd	3–0	#5 Kentucky Wildcats
Álvaro García Pascual 6'; Joao Roberto 65'; Matthew Bell 87'	Report

Hoops Family Field, Huntington, WV
Attendance: 2176
Referee: Kevin Fikar

November 8, 2023
7:00 PM EDT

#3 West Virginia Mountaineers	2–0	#7 South Carolina Gamecocks
Luke McCormick 13'; Yutaro Tsukada 50'	Report

UCF Soccer and Track Stadium, Orlando, FL
Attendance: 205
Referee: Nickrod Fateh

=== Final ===
November 12, 2023
1:00 PM EDT

#1 Marshall Thundering Herd	3–2	#3 West Virginia Mountaineers
Álvaro García Pascual 25', 77'; Aymane Sordo 36'	Report	Sergio Ors Navarro 18', 31'

Hoops Family Field, Huntington, WV
Attendance: 3151
Referee: David Erbacher

== Honors ==
=== All-Tournament Team ===
The following were recognized by the Sun Belt Conference as the All-Tournament Team.

Position	Player	School
F	Álvaro García Pascual	Marshall
F	Yutaro Tsukada	West Virginia
F	Ben Damge	Kentucky
M	Alymane Sordo	Marshall
M	Sergio Ors Navarro	West Virginia
M	Luke McCormick	West Virginia
D	Rai Pinto	Marshall
D	Alex Bamford	Marshall
D	William Nilsson	South Carolina
D	Kasper Lehm	South Carolina
GK	Casper Mols	Kentucky
