= 2023 America East men's soccer tournament =

- Classification: Division I
- Teams: 6
- Matches: 5
- Attendance: 6,744
- Site: Campus Sites (Higher Seed)
- Champions: Bryant (1st title)
- Winning coach: Ruben Resendes (1st title)
- MVP: Antreas Hadjigavriel (Bryant)
- Broadcast: ESPN+

2023 America East Conference men's soccer standings
	Conf.					Overall
Team	W		L		T	W		L		T
No. 9 New Hampshire +	4	–	0	–	3	13	–	3	–	4
Bryant ‡	4	–	1	–	2	16	–	2	–	2
UMBC	3	–	1	–	3	7	–	4	–	5
No. 14 Vermont +	4	–	3	–	0	13	–	6	–	2
NJIT	3	–	2	–	2	7	–	8	–	4
Binghamton	2	–	2	–	3	5	–	10	–	3
Albany	1	–	5	–	1	5	–	11	–	1
UMass Lowell	0	–	7	–	0	2	–	11	–	3
‡ – Tournament champion + – At-large invitation to the 2023 NCAA tournament; As of December 12, 2023; Rankings from United Soccer Coaches

The 2023 America East Conference men's soccer tournament was the postseason men's soccer tournament for the America East Conference held from November 4 through November 12, 2023. The five-match tournament took place at campus sites, with the higher seed hosting. The six-team single-elimination tournament consisted of three rounds based on seeding from regular season conference play. The defending champions were the New Hampshire Wildcats, who were unable to defend their title. New Hampshire lost in overtime to Bryant 1–0. It was the first America East tournament victory for the Bryant Bulldogs soccer program, and first for Head Coach Ruben Resendes. As tournament champions, Bryant earned the America East's automatic berth into the 2023 NCAA Division I men's soccer tournament.

== Seeding ==
The top six teams in the regular season earned a spot in the tournament, with the top two seeds receiving byes into the Semifinals. A tiebreaker was required as UMBC and Vermont finished tied for third, both with twelve points in conference play. UMBC was awarded the third seed by virtue of their 2–1 victory over Vermont on October 21. All other teams finished with a unique number of conference regular season points.

Seed	School	Conference Record	Points
1	New Hampshire	4–0–3	15
2	Bryant	4–1–2	14
3	UMBC	3–1–3	12
4	Vermont	4–3–0	12
5	NJIT	3–2–2	11
6	Binghamton	2–2–3	9

== Bracket ==
Quarterfinals; Saturday, Nov. 4
4	Vermont	1
5	NJIT	2
3	UMBC	0
6	Binghamton	1

Semifinals; Wednesday, Nov. 8
1	New Hampshire	1
5	NJIT	0
2	Bryant	3
6	Binghamton	1

Final; Sunday, Nov. 12
1	New Hampshire	0
2	Bryant (a.e.t)	1

== Schedule ==
=== Quarterfinals ===
November 4	#4 Vermont	1–2	#5 NJIT	Burlington, VT
3:00 p.m. ET	Yaniv Bazini 78'	Report	42' Goncalo Franco; 53' Hugo Tavares	Stadium: Virtue Field; Attendance: 617; Referee: Adam Kilpatrick; Assistant referees: Jason Klump; Nicola Vesia; Fourth official: Jamie LaBarge

November 4	#3 UMBC	0–1	#6 Binghamton	Baltimore, MD
7:00 p.m. ET	Jojo Ocran (yellow card) 48'; Jago Lott (yellow card) 66'	Report	(yellow card) 61' Carlo Cavalar; (yellow card) 68' Will Noecker; 79' Billy Clark	Stadium: Retriever Soccer Park; Attendance: 1,427; Referee: Mike DeFelice; Assistant referees: Michael Kelly; Conor McCloskey; Fourth official: Jason Blight

=== Semifinals ===
November 8	#1 New Hampshire	1–0	#5 NJIT	Durham, NH
6:00 p.m. ET	Georgios Koliniatis 23'; Dominik Kurija (yellow card) 65'; Atila Ashrafi (yellow card) 76'	Report	(yellow card) 19' Maximus Barboto; (yellow card) 66' Justin Aguirre-Rosas; (yellow card) 85' Goncalo Franco; (yellow card) 88' Team	Stadium: Wildcat Stadium; Attendance: 1,227; Referee: Tyler McElhinney; Assistant referees: Mounir Idmalak; Jonathan Luk; Fourth official: Matt Stein

November 18	#2 Bryant	3–1	#6 Binghamton	Smithfield, RI
7:00 p.m. ET	Filippo Censini (yellow card) 17'; Adrian Camacho 24'; Javier Soler Gandia 40'; Inigo Villaldea 55'	Report	77' Calvin Moe	Stadium: Beirne Stadium; Attendance: 1,137; Referee: Yevgeniy Mednikov; Assistant referees: Adam Cook; Ruben Seyde; Fourth official: Jason Dizek

=== Final ===
November 12	#1 New Hampshire	0–1 (a.e.t.)	#2 Bryant	Durham, NH
2:00 p.m. ET	Atila Ashrafi (yellow card) 50'	Report	(yellow card) 78' Vicente Valor Martinez; (yellow card) 79' Gustavo Rodriguez; (yellow card) 91' Kerman Sukia; 102' Jonas Lyshoj	Stadium: Wildcat Stadium; Attendance: 2,336; Referee: Daniel Shenk Moreno; Assistant referees: John Luk; John Lazaro; Fourth official: Michael Humprhies

== Statistics ==
=== Goalscorers ===
There were 10 goals scored in 5 matches, for an average of 2 goals per match (as of November 12, 2023).

1 goal

- Billy Clark – Binghamton
- Calvin Moe – Binghamton
- Adrian Camacho – Bryant
- Jonas Lyshoj – Bryant
- Javier Soler Gandia – Bryant
- Inigo Villaldea – Bryant
- Georgios Koliniatis – New Hampshire
- Goncalo Franco – NJIT
- Hugo Tavares – NJIT
- Yaniv Bazini – Vermont

== All-Tournament team ==
Player	Team
Will Noecker	Binghamton
Markos Touroukis	Binghamton
Jonas Lyshoj	Bryant
**Antreas Hadjigavriel**	Bryant
Herman Sukia	Bryant
Inigo Villalder	Bryant
Liam Bennett	New Hampshire
Isaac Heffess	New Hampshire
Georgios Koliniatis	New Hampshire
Maximus Barboto	NJIT
Samuel Reisgys	NJIT
Jordan Ehart	UMBC
Daniel Pacella	Vermont

MVP in bold
