= Matthew Bell (footballer, born 2002) =

Jamaican footballer

Personal information
- Date of birth: August 27, 2002 (age 24)
- Place of birth: Kingston, Jamaica
- Height: 5 ft 10 in (1.78 m)
- Position: Forward

Team information
- Current team: Portmore United
- Number: 33

Youth career
- Real Mona FC
- 2020–2021: Kingston Football Academy

College career
Years	Team	Apps	(Gls)
2022–2023	Marshall Thundering Herd	39	(20)

Senior career*
Years	Team	Apps	(Gls)
2021–2022	Valeo FC	11	(9)
2024–2025	Real Salt Lake	1	(0)
2024	→ Real Monarchs (loan)	20	(4)
2024	→ Tulsa (loan)	7	(0)
2026–	Portmore United	5	(0)
- * Club domestic league appearances and goals as of June 19, 2026

Matthew Bell (born 27 August 2002) is a Jamaican footballer who plays for Jamaica Premier League club Portmore United.

== Early life ==
Bell was born in Kingston, Jamaica. He began playing youth soccer in Jamaica with Real Mona FC, later joining the Kingston Football Academy in 2020.

== College career ==
In 2022, Bell began attending Marshall University, where he played with the men's soccer team. On August 25, 2022, he scored his first goal in his collegiate debut in a 5–0 victory over the VCU Rams. At the end of his first season, he was named the Sun Belt Conference Freshman of the Year and named to the All-Sun Belt Conference First Team.

Ahead of the 2023, he was named to the All-Sun Belt Preseason Team and named to the Mac Hermann Trophy Watch List. On August 24, 2023, he scored a hat trick in a 4–0 victory over the Oakland Golden Grizzlies. In his second season, he was named the Sun Belt Conference Offensive Player of the Week twice. He finished the season with a single-season school program record 12 assists and 10 goals for 32 points. At the end of the season, he was named the Sun Belt Conference Player of the Year and Offensive Player of the Year, as well as being named to the All-SBC First Team. He was also named a First Team All-American and finished as a Mac Hermann semifinalist. He was also invited to participate in the MLS College Showcase.

== Club career ==
In 2021, Bell joined Valeo FC in the National Premier Soccer League.

At the 2024 MLS SuperDraft, Bell was selected in the first round (16th overall) by Real Salt Lake. In February 2024, he signed a four-year contract with the club.

In May 2025, Bell returned to Jamaica and signed with eventual league champions, Portmore United F.C..

== Honours ==
Individual

- Sun Belt Conference Offensive Player of the Year: 2023

Team

Portmore United

- Champion : 2025-2026 Jamaica Premiere League
