= Morris Duggan =

German footballer (born 2000)

Personal information
- Date of birth: 24 October 2000 (age 26)
- Place of birth: Kirchheim bei München, Germany
- Height: 1.93 m (6 ft 4 in)
- Position: Defender

Team information
- Current team: Minnesota United
- Number: 23

Youth career
- 2006–2017: Kirchheimer SC
- 2017–2019: FC Ismaning

College career
| Years | Team | Apps | (Gls) |
| 2021 | Iowa Lakes Lakers | 23 | (0) |
| 2022–2023 | Marshall Thundering Herd | 37 | (3) |

Senior career*
| Years | Team | Apps | (Gls) |
| 2018–2019 | FC Ismaning II | 1 | (1) |
| 2019–2020 | Kirchheimer SC | 21 | (0) |
| 2020–2021 | VfR Garching | 0 | (0) |
| 2021 | Kirchheimer SC | 4 | (0) |
| 2022 | Des Moines Menace | 2 | (0) |
| 2024– | Minnesota United | 32 | (1) |
| 2024– | → Minnesota United 2 (loan) | 21 | (0) |
| 2024 | → Rhode Island FC (loan) | 9 | (0) |
- * Club domestic league appearances and goals as of 9 April 2026

Morris Duggan (born 24 October 2000) is a German professional footballer who plays for Minnesota United FC of Major League Soccer.

== Early life ==
Duggan began playing youth football at age five with Kirchheimer SC, where he played until moving to FC Ismaning in 2017.

== College career ==
In 2021, Duggan moved to the United States to attend college, initially set to attend Francis Marion University, however, due to not meeting certain academic requirements, he was deemed ineligible and instead transferred to Iowa Lakes Community College. He helped Iowa Lakes win the 2021 Midwest District Championship and was named an All-Region Honorable Mention.

In 2022, he transferred to Marshall University to play for the men's soccer team in the NCAA. On 23 October 2022, he scored his first goal in a victory over the Georgia Southern Eagles. Ahead of the 2023 season, he was named to the Preseason All-Sun Belt Conference Team and named team captain. At the end of the season he was named the Sun Belt Conference Defensive Player of the Year and was named to the All-Sun Belt Conference First Team. He was also named a First Team All-American and finished as a Mac Hermann semifinalist. He was also invited to participate in the MLS College Showcase.

== Club career ==
Duggan made his senior debut with FC Ismaning II in 2018 in the Kreisklasse 2.

In 2019, he returned to his former youth club Kirchheimer SC in the Landesliga Bayern-Südost.

In July 2020, he signed with VfR Garching in the fourth tier Regionalliga Bayern.

In July 2021, he returned to Kirchheimer SC briefly, before heading to college in the United States.

In 2022, he played with the Des Moines Menace in USL League Two.

At the 2024 MLS SuperDraft, Duggan was selected in the third round (67th overall) by Minnesota United FC. He initially missed the start of training camp with the club, due to visa issues, but was eventually able to arrive. In February 2024, he signed a one-year contract with the club, with club options for the next three seasons. He made his Major League Soccer debut for the first team on 8 June against FC Dallas. He spent the majority of the season with the second team, Minnesota United FC 2 in MLS Next Pro, before being loaned to USL Championship side Rhode Island FC for the remainder of the 2024 season.

== Career statistics ==
As of 9 April 2026

Appearances and goals by club, season and competition
| Club | Season | League | | | Playoffs | | National cup | | Continental | | Other | | Total | |
| Club | Season | Division | Apps | Goals | Apps | Goals | Apps | Goals | Apps | Goals | Apps | Goals | Apps | Goals |
|---|---|---|---|---|---|---|---|---|---|---|---|---|---|---|
| FC Ismaning II | 2018–2019 | Kreisklasse 2 | 1 | 1 | — | | — | | — | | 0 | 0 | 1 | 1 |
| Kirchheimer SC | 2019–2021 | Landesliga Bayern-Südost | 21 | 0 | — | | — | | — | | 0 | 0 | 21 | 0 |
| VfR Garching | 2019–2021 | Regionalliga Bayern | 0 | 0 | — | | — | | — | | 1 (Note: Appearance in Bayern Ligapokal) | 0 | 1 | 0 |
| Kirchheimer SC | 2021–2022 | Landesliga Bayern-Südost | 4 | 0 | — | | — | | — | | 0 | 0 | 4 | 0 |
| Des Moines Menace | 2022 | USL League Two | 2 | 0 | 0 | 0 | 2 | 0 | — | | — | | 4 | 0 |
| Minnesota United FC | 2024- | Major League Soccer | 29 | 1 | 3 | 9 | | | | | | | 32 | 1 |
| Minnesota United FC 2 (loan) | 2024 | MLS Next Pro | 21 | 0 | | | | | | | | | 21 | 0 |
| Rhode Island FC (loan) | 2024 | USL Championship | 9 | 0 | | | | | | | | | 9 | 0 |
| Career total | | | 28 | 1 | 0 | 2 | 0 | 0 | 0 | 0 | 1 | 0 | 93 | 2 |

== Honours ==
Individual

- Sun Belt Conference Defensive Player of the Year: 2023
