= 2023 NCAA Division I men's soccer rankings =

- Season: 2023
- NCAA Tournament: 2023
- Preseason No. 1: Syracuse
- NCAA Tournament Champions: Clemson
NCAA Division I men's soccer rankings


Two major human polls made up the 2023 NCAA Division I men's soccer rankings: United Soccer Coaches and Top Drawer Soccer.

== Legend ==
	Increase in ranking
	Decrease in ranking
	New to rankings from previous week
Italics	Number of first place votes
(#–#)	Win-loss record
т	Tied with team above or below also with this symbol

== United Soccer Coaches ==
	Preseason Aug 1	Week 1 Aug 29	Week 2 Sep 5	Week 3 Sep 12	Week 4 Sep 19	Week 5 Sep 26	Week 6 Oct 3	Week 7 Oct 10	Week 8 Oct 17	Week 9 Oct 24	Week 10 Oct 31	Week 11 Nov 6	Final Dec 12	
1.	Syracuse (4)	Syracuse (2–0–0) (8)	Stanford (3–0–0) (8)	Stanford (4–0–0) (4)	Marshall (7–0–0) (7)	Marshall (8–0–0) (8)	Marshall (10–0–0) (7)	Marshall (11–0–0) (7)	Marshall (12–0–0) (8)	UCF (9–1–2) (7)	UCF (10–1–2) (8)	Marshall (15–2–0) (8)	Clemson (15–3–5) (7)	1.
2.	Indiana (1)	Kentucky (2–0–0)	Marshall (3–0–0)	Marshall (5–0–0) (3)	West Virginia (5–0–1)	SMU (7–1–0)	UCF (5–1–2)	UCF (6–1–2) (1)	UCF (7–1–2)	West Virginia (11–0–4) (1)	Notre Dame (11–1–4)	SMU (12–1–2)	Notre Dame (13–3–6) (1)	2.
3.	Kentucky (1)	Duke (2–0–0)	Portland (3–0–0)	Akron (5–0–1) (1)	UCF (4–0–2)	UCF (4–1–2)	West Virginia (8–0–2) (1)	Akron (8–0–4)	Wake Forest (10–1–3)	Wake Forest (11–1–4)	SMU (11–1–2)	Georgetown (12–2–2)	West Virginia (17–3–4)	3.
4.	Duke (1)	Stanford (2–0–0)	Syracuse (3–0–1)	West Virginia (5–0–0)	Akron (5–0–2)	West Virginia (6–0–2)	SMU (7–1–1)	Wake Forest (8–1–3)	SMU (9–1–2)	SMU (10–1–2)	Marshall (13–2–0)	Notre Dame (11–2–4)	Oregon State (11–6–5)	4.
5.	Pittsburgh	Marshall (2–0–0)	Akron (3–0–1)	UCF (4–0–1) т	Portland (4–1–0)	Akron (5–0–4)	Akron (6–0–4)	Georgetown (8–1–1)	West Virginia (9–0–4)	Notre Dame (10–1–4)	Georgetown (11–2–2)	West Virginia (13–1–4)	Stanford (11–4–5)	5.
6.	Washington	Portland (1–0–0)	UCF (3–0–0)	Louisville (4–0–1) т	SMU (6–1–0) (1)	Stanford (5–1–1)	Wake Forest (7–1–3)	SMU (8–1–2)	Notre Dame (9–1–3)	Marshall (12–2–0)	Wake Forest (11–1–5)	Wake Forest (11–2–5)	North Carolina (11–4–7)	6.
7.	Stanford	FIU (2–0–0)	Louisville (3–0–0)	Syracuse (3–0–2)	Syracuse (3–0–3)	Syracuse (4–1–3)	Portland (6–2–0)	West Virginia (8–0–4)	Akron (9–0–5)	Georgetown (9–2–2)	West Virginia (11–1–4)	North Carolina (9–3–5)	Indiana (15–4–5)	7.
8.	Creighton	Pittsburgh (1–0–1)	James Madison (3–0–0)	Duke (4–0–1)	Stanford (4–1–1)	Louisville (6–1–1)	Georgetown (6–1–1)	Notre Dame (7–1–3)	Georgetown (8–2–1)	Duke (8–3–2)	Duke (10–3–2)	Duke (11–3–3)	Marshall (18–3–0)	8.
9.	Clemson	Akron (2–0–0)	Wake Forest (2–0–2)	James Madison (4–0–1)	Missouri State (4–0–1)	Missouri State (5–0–1)	Missouri State (6–0–2)	Stanford (6–1–3)	Duke (8–3–1)	Portland (9–3–0)	Virginia (10–3–3)	Seattle (12–2–3)	New Hampshire (13–3–4)	9.
10.	UNC Greensboro	Indiana (0–0–1)	Duke (3–0–1)	Notre Dame (4–0–1)	Louisville (4–1–1)	Wake Forest (5–1–3)	Stanford (5–1–3)	Syracuse (6–2–3)	Missouri State (7–1–3)	North Carolina (7–2–5)т	Seattle (12–2–3)	New Hampshire (11–1–4)	SMU (14–3–2)	10.
11.	Marshall	SMU (2–0–0)	FIU (2–0–1)	Portland (3–1–0)	Duke (4–1–1)	Portland (5–2–0)	Notre Dame (6–1–3)	Pittsburgh (5–3–3)	North Carolina (6–2–4)	Clemson (9–3–2)т	New Hampshire (10–1–4)	Virginia (10–3–4)	Loyola Marymount (10–5–6)	11.
12.	Vermont	Louisville (2–0–0)	Vermont (3–1–0)	Vermont (4–1–0)	James Madison (4–1–2)	Georgetown (5–1–1)	Northwestern (8–0–2)	Northwestern (9–0–3)	Portland (8–3–0)	Seattle (10–2–3)	Portland (10–4–0)	UCF (10–3–2)	Western Michigan (17–1–4)	12.
13.	Portland	UCF (2–0–0)	Missouri State (2–0–0)	Marquette (6–0–0)	Northwestern (6–0–1)	Michigan State (5–0–2)	North Carolina (4–0–4)	Cal State Fullerton (10–2–2)	Seattle (9–2–3)	Akron (9–1–6)	North Carolina (7–3–5)	Portland (11–4–0)	Virginia (11–4–4)	13.
14.	Maryland	Saint Louis (1–0–0)	Penn State (2–0–2)	Denver (4–0–2)	Wake Forest (3–1–3)	Vermont (6–1–1)	Duke (6–2–1)	North Carolina (5–1–4)	FIU (7–2–3)	Virginia (8–3–3)	Clemson (9–3–3)	Clemson (9–3–4)	Vermont (13–6–2)	14.
15.	Virginia	San Diego (2–0–0)	Indiana (2–1–1)	Missouri State (3–0–1)	Notre Dame (4–1–2)	Notre Dame (5–1–3)	Vermont (7–1–2)	Duke (6–3–1)	Clemson (8–3–2)	Stanford (7–2–4)	Missouri State (9–2–3)	Missouri State (10–2–3)	Wake Forest (11–3–5)	15.
16.	Tulsa	Wake Forest (1–0–1)	West Virginia (3–0–0)	SMU (5–1–0)	Georgetown (3–1–1)	Northwestern (7–0–2)	Hofstra (8–1–2)	Missouri State (6–1–3)	Vermont (9–2–2)	Michigan State (7–0–6)	Vermont (11–3–2)	Western Michigan (13–1–3)	Georgetown (13–3–3)	16.
17.	Georgetown	James Madison (2–0–0)	Denver (2–0–2)	Pittsburgh (2–2–1)	Vermont (4–1–1)	San Diego State (6–0–1)	Seattle (7–2–2)	Portland (6–3–0)	Stanford (6–2–3)	New Hampshire (9–1–4)	Hofstra (11–3–4)	Hofstra (12–3–4)	Hofstra (14–3–5)	17.
18.	Wake Forest	Missouri State (1–0–0)	SIUE (3–0–0)	San Diego State (4–0–1)	New Hampshire (4–1–1)	North Carolina (4–0–3)	Syracuse (4–2–3)	Hofstra (9–1–3)	Virginia (7–3–3)	Missouri State (8–2–3)	Western Michigan (12–1–3)	Syracuse (8–3–7)	James Madison (10–5–5)	18.
19.	SMU	New Hampshire (1–0–1)	Kentucky (2–1–0)	Northwestern (5–0–1)	Denver (4–1–3)	Hofstra (6–1–2)	Penn State (6–1–3)	Michigan State (6–0–4)	New Hampshire (7–1–4)	Syracuse (7–3–5)	Stanford (7–2–5)	Bryant (14–1–2)	UCF (10–4–2)	19.
20.	Cornell	Maryland (1–1–0)	Notre Dame (2–0–1)	Wake Forest (2–1–2)	Washington (3–1–3)	UIC (7–1–1)	Pittsburgh (4–3–3)	Seattle (7–2–3)	Michigan State (6–0–6)	Pittsburgh (6–4–4)	Loyola Marymount (7–2–6)	Louisville (11–4–3)	Duke (11–4–3)	20.
21.	FIU	Penn State (1–0–1)	Wisconsin (3–1–0)	New Hampshire (3–1–1)	San Diego State (5–0–1)	Duke (4–2–1)	Louisville (7–2–1)	Clemson (8–3–1)	Northwestern (9–1–3)	Vermont (10–3–2)	Akron (9–1–7)	UCLA (8–3–5)	UCLA (9–4–5)	21.
22.	Akron	Vermont (1–1–0)	SMU (3–1–0)	San Diego (4–1–1)	Michigan State (4–0–2)	Washington (4–2–3)	San Diego State (6–1–2)	Vermont (8–2–2)	Syracuse (6–3–4)	Hofstra (10–3–4)	Syracuse (7–3–6)	Stanford (8–3–5)	Portland (12–5–0)	22.
23.	New Hampshire	Washington (1–1–0)	Seton Hall (3–1–0)	Indiana (2–2–1)	Marquette (6–1–0)	Seattle (5–2–2)	Michigan State (5–0–4)	FIU (6–2–3)	Pittsburgh (5–4–3)	Western Michigan (11–1–3)	FIU (9–3–3)	Denver (11–2–4)	Seattle (12–4–3)	23.
24.	Saint Louis	Loyola Marymount (1–0–1)	Loyola Marymount (1–0–2)	Kentucky (3–2–0)	Hofstra (4–1–2)	New Hampshire (4–1–2)	Fordham (5–1–3)	New Hampshire (6–1–4)	Bryant (11–1–2)	FIU (8–3–3)	Bryant (13–1–2)	SIU Edwardsville (14–0–3)	Louisville (12–6–3)	24.
25.	Pennsylvania	Oral Roberts (2–0–0)	Washington (2–1–1)	Cornell (2–1–0)	UIC (5–1–1)	Penn State (5–1–2)	UIC (7–2–1) т; FIU (5–2–2) т	Saint Louis (6–3–2)	Oral Roberts (7–2–2)	Bryant (12–1–2)	SIU Edwardsville (14–0–3)	Loyola Marymount (7–3–6)	Syracuse (9–5–7)	25.
	Preseason Aug 1	Week 1 Aug 29	Week 2 Sep 5	Week 3 Sep 12	Week 4 Sep 19	Week 5 Sep 26	Week 6 Oct 3	Week 7 Oct 10	Week 8 Oct 17	Week 9 Oct 24	Week 10 Oct 31	Week 11 Nov 6	Final Dec 12	
		Dropped: No. 8 Creighton; No. 9 Clemson; No. 10 UNC Greensboro; No. 15 Virginia; No. 16 Tulsa; No. 17 Georgetown; No. 20 Cornell; No. 25 Pennsylvania	Dropped: No. 8 Pittsburgh; No. 14 Saint Louis; No. 15 San Diego; No. 19 New Hampshire; No. 20 Maryland; No. 25 Oral Roberts	Dropped: No. 11 FIU; No. 14 Penn State; No. 18 SIUE; No. 21 Wisconsin; No. 23 Seton Hall; No. 24 Loyola Marymount; No. 25 Washington	Dropped: No. 17 Pittsburgh; No. 22 San Diego; No. 23 Indiana; No. 24 Kentucky; No. 25 Cornell	Dropped: No. 12 James Madison; No. 19 Denver; No. 23 Marquette	Dropped: No. 22 Washington; No. 24 New Hampshire	Dropped: No. 19 Penn State; No. 21 Louisville; No. 22 San Diego State; No. 24 Fordham; No. 25т UIC	Dropped: No. 13 Cal State Fullerton; No. 18 Hofstra; No. 25 Saint Louis	Dropped: No. 21 Northwestern; No. 25 Oral Roberts	Dropped: No. 16 Michigan State; No. 20 Pittsburgh	Dropped: No. 16 Vermont; No. 21 Akron; No. 23 FIU	Dropped: No. 15 Missouri State; No. 19 Bryant; No. 23 Denver; No. 24 SIU Edwardsville	

== Top Drawer Soccer ==
	Preseason Aug 21	Week 1 Aug 28	Week 2 Sep 4	Week 3 Sep 11	Week 4 Sep 18	Week 5 Sep 25	Week 6 Oct 2	Week 7 Oct 9	Week 8 Oct 16	Week 9 Oct 23	Week 10 Oct 30	Week 11 Nov 6	Week 12 Nov 13	Week 13 Nov 20	Week 14 Nov 27	Week 15 Dec 4	Final Dec 11	
1.	Syracuse	Syracuse (1–0–0)	Stanford (2–0–0)	Stanford (4–0–0)	Marshall (7–0–0)	Marshall (8–0–0)	Marshall (10–0–0)	Marshall (11–0–0)	Marshall (12–0–0)	West Virginia (11–0–4)	UCF (10–1–2)	SMU (12–1–2)	Marshall (17–2–0)	Marshall (18–2–0)	West Virginia (16–2–4)	West Virginia (17–2–4)	Clemson (13–3–5)	1.
2.	Indiana	Stanford (2–0–0)	Marshall (3–0–0)	Marshall (5–0–0)	West Virginia (5–0–1)	SMU (7–1–0)	UCF (5–1–2)	UCF (6–1–2)	UCF (7–1–2)	UCF (9–1–2)	Notre Dame (11–1–4)	West Virginia (13–1–4)	Bryant (16–1–2)	West Virginia (15–2–4)	Clemson (12–3–5)	Clemson (13–3–5)	Notre Dame (12–2–6)	2.
3.	Washington	Indiana (0–0–1)	Syracuse (2–0–1)	Duke (4–0–1)	SMU (6–1–0)	UCF (4–1–2)	Wake Forest (7–1–3)	Wake Forest (8–1–3)	Wake Forest (10–1–3)	Wake Forest (11–1–4)	SMU (11–1–2)	Marshall (15–2–0)	West Virginia (14–2–4)	Clemson (11–3–5)	Stanford (11–3–5)	Oregon State (11–5–5)	West Virginia (17–2–4)	3.
4.	Clemson	Duke (2–0–0)	Washington (2–1–0)	Vermont (4–1–0)	UCF (4–0–2)	Stanford (5–1–1)	West Virginia (8–0–2)	Georgetown (8–1–1)	Notre Dame (9–1–3)	Notre Dame (10–1–4)	West Virginia (11–1–4)	Notre Dame (11–2–4)	Clemson (10–3–5)	SMU (14–2–2)	Oregon State (10–5–5)	Notre Dame (12–2–6)	Oregon State (11–5–5)	4.
5.	Duke	Kentucky (1–0–0)	Georgetown (2–1–0)	Akron (4–0–1)	Syracuse (3–0–3)	Wake Forest (5–1–3)	SMU (7–1–1)	Akron (8–0–4)	SMU (9–1–2)	SMU (10–1–2)	Wake Forest (11–1–5)	Seattle (12–2–3)	SMU (13–2–2)	Notre Dame (12–2–4)	Notre Dame (12–2–5)	Stanford (11–4–5)	Stanford (11–4–5)	5.
6.	Kentucky	Marshall (1–0–0)	Portland (2–0–0)	Syracuse (3–0–2)	Stanford (4–1–1)	Vermont (6–1–1)	Stanford (5–1–3)	Notre Dame (7–1–3)	West Virginia (9–0–4)	Marshall (12–2–0)	Marshall (13–2–0)	Georgetown (12–2–2)	Notre Dame (11–2–4)	North Carolina (11–3–6)	North Carolina (11–3–7)	North Carolina (11–4–7)	North Carolina (11–4–7)	6.
7.	Pittsburgh	Vermont (1–0–0)	Indiana (1–1–1)	Louisville (4–0–1)	Washington (3–1–3)	West Virginia (6–0–2)	Georgetown (6–1–1)	Stanford (5–1–3)	Akron (9–0–5)	Portland (9–3–0)	Duke (10–3–2)	Wake Forest (11–2–5)	Georgetown (13–2–3)	Western Michigan (17–1–3)	Indiana (15–4–4)	Indiana (15–4–5)	Indiana (15–4–5)	7.
8.	Stanford	Pittsburgh (0–0–1)	Duke (2–0–1)	Pittsburgh (2–2–1)	Portland (4–1–0)	Syracuse (4–1–3)	Portland (6–2–0)	SMU (8–1–2)	Duke (8–3–1)	Duke (8–3–2)	Seattle (12–2–3)	Duke (11–3–3)	North Carolina (10–3–6)	Hofstra (14–3–4)	Loyola Marymount (10–4–6)	Loyola Marymount (10–5–6)	Loyola Marymount (10–5–6)	8.
9.	Marshall	Washington (1–1–0)	Kentucky (2–1–0)	SMU (4–1–0)	Wake Forest (3–1–3)	Georgetown (5–1–1)	Akron (6–0–4)	Pittsburgh (5–3–3)	Portland (8–3–0)	Clemson (9–3–2)	Virginia (10–3–3)	UCF (10–3–2)	Wake Forest (11–2–5)	Virginia (11–3–4)	Marshall (18–3–0)	Marshall (18–3–0)	Marshall (18–3–0)	9.
10.	UNC Greensboro	Clemson (0–1–0)	Vermont (2–1–0)	West Virginia (5–0–0)	Vermont (4–1–1)	Missouri State (5–0–1)	Pittsburgh (4–3–3)	West Virginia (8–0–4)	Georgetown (8–2–1)	Pittsburgh (6–4–4)	Georgetown (11–2–2)	Bryant (14–1–2)	Western Michigan (15–1–3)	Indiana (14–4–4)	Western Michigan (17–1–4)	Western Michigan (17–1–4)	Western Michigan (17–1–4)	10.
11.	Maryland	Maryland (1–1–0)	Pittsburgh (1–1–1)	Kentucky (3–2–0)	Akron (5–0–2)	Washington (3–2–3)	North Carolina (4–0–4)	Syracuse (6–2–3)	Vermont (9–2–2)	Seattle (10–2–3)	Vermont (11–3–2)	Clemson (9–3–4)	Duke (11–3–3)	New Hampshire (13–2–4)	Hofstra (14–3–5)	Hofstra (14–3–5)	Hofstra (14–3–5)	11.
12.	Georgetown	Georgetown (1–1–0)	Maryland (1–1–1)	Portland (3–1–0)	Duke (4–1–1)	Michigan State (5–0–2)	Duke (6–2–1)	North Carolina (5–1–4)	Clemson (8–3–2)	Virginia (8–3–3)	Bryant (13–1–2)	Virginia (10–3–4)	UCLA (9–3–5)	Stanford (10–3–5)	Virginia (11–4–4)	Virginia (11–4–4)	Virginia (11–4–4)	12.
13.	Vermont	Portland (1–0–0)	Denver (2–0–1)	Denver (4–0–2)	Georgetown (3–1–1)	Louisville (5–1–1)	Syracuse (4–2–3)	Duke (6–3–1)	North Carolina (6–2–4)	Georgetown (9–2–2)	Western Michigan (12–1–3)	Western Michigan (13–1–3)	Hofstra (13–3–4)	James Madison (10–4–5)	New Hampshire (13–3–4)	New Hampshire (13–3–4)	New Hampshire (13–3–4)	13.
14.	Cornell	Cornell (0–0–0)	Wake Forest (1–0–2)	Washington (2–1–2)	New Hampshire (4–1–1)	San Diego State (6–0–1)	Vermont (7–1–2)	Portland (6–3–0)	Stanford (6–2–3)	Akron (9–1–6)	Clemson (9–3–3)	New Hampshire (11–1–4)	UCF (10–3–2)	Vermont (13–5–2)	James Madison (10–5–5)	James Madison (10–5–5)	James Madison (10–5–5)	14.
15.	Portland	UNC Greensboro (0–1–1)	Wisconsin (3–0–0)	UCF (4–0–1)	Missouri State (4–0–1)	Portland (5–1–0)	Missouri State (6–0–2)	Clemson (8–3–1)	Pittsburgh (5–4–3)	Vermont (10–3–2)	Missouri State (9–2–3)	North Carolina (9–3–5)	Virginia (10–3–4)	Oregon State (9–5–5)	Vermont (13–6–2)	Vermont (13–6–2)	Vermont (13–6–2)	15.
16.	Creighton	SMU (1–0–0)	Akron (2–0–1)	Cornell (2–1–0)	Pittsburgh (3–2–2)	Pittsburgh (3–3–2)	Notre Dame (6–1–3)	Cal State Fullerton (10–2–2)	Missouri State (7–1–3)	Stanford (7–2–4)	Denver (10–2–4)	Missouri State (10–2–3)	Indiana (12–4–4)	Loyola Marymount (9–4–6)	SMU (14–3–2)	SMU (14–3–2)	SMU (14–3–2)	16.
17.	Wake Forest	Wake Forest (1–0–1)	UCF (3–0–0)	Georgetown (2–1–1)	Denver (4–1–3)	Akron (5–0–4)	Northwestern (8–0–2)	Hofstra (9–1–3)	Syracuse (6–3–4)	Bryant (12–1–2)	Akron (9–1–7)	Denver (11–2–4)	New Hampshire (12–2–4)	Georgetown (13–3–3)	Georgetown (13–3–3)	Georgetown (13–3–3)	Georgetown (13–3–3)	17.
18.	SMU	Creighton (0–1–1)	Clemson (1–1–1)	New Hampshire (3–1–1)	Michigan State (4–0–2)	New Hampshire (4–1–2)	Clemson (6–3–1)	Northwestern (9–0–3)	Oral Roberts (7–2–2)	North Carolina (7–2–5)	Portland (10–4–0)	Portland (11–4–0)	Portland (12–4–0)	Wake Forest (11–3–5)	Wake Forest (11–3–5)	Wake Forest (11–3–5)	Wake Forest (11–3–5)	18.
19.	Denver	Denver (1–0–1)	Louisville (3–0–0)	Wake Forest (2–1–2)	Louisville (4–1–1)	North Carolina (4–0–3)	Cal State Fullerton (8–2–2)	Vermont (8–2–2)	FIU (7–2–3)	Syracuse (7–3–5)	New Hampshire (10–1–4)	Syracuse (8–3–7)	Seattle (12–3–3)	Duke (11–4–3)	Duke (11–4–3)	Duke (11–4–3)	Duke (11–4–3)	19.
20.	Tulsa	Saint Louis (1–0–0)	SMU (2–1–0)	Notre Dame (4–0–1)	Northwestern (6–0–1)	Denver (5–1–3)	Washington (4–3–3)	Missouri State (6–1–3)	Seattle (9–2–3)	Western Michigan (11–1–3)	Pittsburgh (6–5–4)	Louisville (11–4–3)	Missouri State (11–3–3)	UCLA (9–4–5)	UCLA (9–4–5)	UCLA (9–4–5)	UCLA (9–4–5)	20.
21.	Saint Louis	Akron (1–0–0)	Missouri State (2–0–0)	Indiana (2–2–1)	San Diego State (5–0–1)	Duke (4–2–1)	San Diego State (6–1–2)	Saint Louis (6–3–2)	Cal State Fullerton (11–3–2)	Missouri State (8–2–3)	Stanford (7–2–5)	UCLA (8–3–5)	Syracuse (8–4–7)	UCF (10–4–2)	UCF (10–4–2)	UCF (10–4–2)	UCF (10–4–2)	21.
22.	Akron	Tulsa (1–1–0)	Cornell (0–1–0)	Missouri State (3–0–1)	Virginia (4–2–1)	Notre Dame (5–1–3)	Michigan State (5–0–4)	Oral Roberts (6–2–2)	Virginia (7–3–3)	New Hampshire (9–1–4)	North Carolina (7–3–5)	Oral Roberts (10–3–3)	SIUE (16–0–3)	Portland (12–5–0)	Portland (12–5–0)	Portland (12–5–0)	Portland (12–5–0)	22.
23.	High Point	FIU (1–0–0)	Penn State (1–0–2)	Marquette (5–0–0)	Clemson (4–2–1)	Northwestern (7–0–2)	Louisville (6–2–1)	Michigan State (6–0–4)	Northwestern (9–1–3)	Denver (9–2–4)	FIU (9–3–3)	Vermont (11–5–2)	Charlotte (11–3–1)	Missouri State (12–4–3)	Missouri State (12–4–3)	Missouri State (12–4–3)	Missouri State (12–4–3)	23.
24.	FIU	Pennsylvania (0–0–0)	Oral Roberts (3–0–0)	James Madison (4–0–1)	Bryant (6–0–0)	Clemson (5–3–1)	Seattle (7–2–2)	UCLA (5–2–3)	Davidson (9–2–1)	Oral Roberts (8–2–3)	Syracuse (7–3–6)	Hofstra (12–3–4)	Louisville (11–5–3)	Syracuse (9–5–7)	Syracuse (9–5–7)	Syracuse (9–5–7)	Syracuse (9–5–7)	24.
25.	Pennsylvania	San Diego (2–0–0)	FIU (2–0–1)	San Diego State (4–0–1)	Kentucky (3–3–0)	Bryant (7–1–0)	UCLA (4–2–2)	Washington (5–4–3)	Bryant (11–1–2)	FIU (8–3–3)	Oral Roberts (9–3–3)	SIUE (14–0–3)	Xavier (9–3–6)	Charlotte (12–4–1)	Charlotte (12–4–1)	Charlotte (12–4–1)	Charlotte (12–4–1)	25.
	Preseason Aug 21	Week 1 Aug 28	Week 2 Sep 4	Week 3 Sep 11	Week 4 Sep 18	Week 5 Sep 25	Week 6 Oct 2	Week 7 Oct 9	Week 8 Oct 16	Week 9 Oct 23	Week 10 Oct 30	Week 11 Nov 6	Week 12 Nov 13	Week 13 Nov 20	Week 14 Nov 27	Week 15 Dec 4	Final Dec 11	
		Dropped: No. 23 High Point	Dropped: No. 15 UNC Greensboro; No. 20 Saint Louis; No. 22 Tulsa; No. 24 Pennsylvania; No. 25 San Diego	Dropped: No. 12 Maryland; No. 15 Wisconsin; No. 18 Clemson; No. 23 Penn State; No. 24 Oral Roberts; No. 25 FIU	Dropped: No. 16 Cornell; No. 20 Notre Dame; No. 21 Indiana; No. 23 Marquette; No. 24 James Madison	Dropped: No. 22 Virginia; No. 25 Kentucky	Dropped: No. 18 New Hampshire; No. 20 Denver; No. 25 Bryant	Dropped: No. 21 San Diego State; No. 23 Louisville; No. 24 Seattle	Dropped: No. 17 Hofstra; No. 21 Saint Louis; No. 23 Michigan State; No. 24 UCLA; No. 25 Washington	Dropped: No. 21 Cal State Fullerton; No. 23 Northwestern; No. 24 Davidson	None	Dropped: No. 17 Akron; No. 20 Pittsburgh; No. 21 Stanford; No. 23 FIU	Dropped: No. 17 Denver; No. 22 Oral Roberts; No. 23 Vermont	Dropped: No. 2 Bryant; No. 19 Seattle; No. 22 SUIE; No. 24 Louisville; No. 25 Xavier	None	None	None	
