= 2023 SIU Edwardsville Cougars men's soccer team =

American college soccer season

2023 SIU Edwardsville Cougars men's soccer

OVC Season Champions OVC Tournament Champions

NCAA Division I Men's Soccer Tournament, 1st round
- Conference: Ohio Valley Conference
- Record: 16–1–3 (9–0–1 OVC)
- Head coach: Cale Wassermann (5th season)
- Assistant coaches: Jordan Grant; Jaxsen Wirth
- Home stadium: Ralph Korte Stadium; Capacity, 4,000

2023 Ohio Valley Conference men's soccer standings
	Conf.					Overall
Team	W		L		T	W		L		T
SIU Edwardsville ‡	9	–	0	–	1	16	–	1	–	3
Incarnate Word	4	–	3	–	3	7	–	8	–	5
Liberty	4	–	4	–	2	9	–	6	–	3
Lindenwood ^{#}	3	–	3	–	4	7	–	7	–	6
Chicago State	3	–	4	–	3	5	–	10	–	4
Eastern Illinois	3	–	5	–	2	4	–	10	–	5
Houston Christian	2	–	4	–	4	4	–	8	–	6
Southern Indiana ^{#}	1	–	6	–	3	2	–	12	–	3
‡ – 2023 Ohio Valley tournament champion + – At-large invitation to the 2023 NCAA tournament ^{#} – Ineligible for NCAA tournament (In transition); As of December 12, 2023; Rankings from United Soccer Coaches; Source: OVC

The 2023 SIU Edwardsville Cougars men's soccer team represented Southern Illinois University Edwardsville during the 2023 NCAA Division I men's soccer season, the school's 57th season. The Cougars were coached by Cale Wassermann. The team played their home games on Bob Guelker Field at the Ralph Korte Stadium as a member of the Ohio Valley Conference (OVC).

== Preseason ==
The Cougars returned thirteen players from 2022 along with four redshirts. They are joined by three true freshmen and six transfer students from other schools. The roster includes players from eight different countries—14 from the US, 4 from England, 3 from Spain, and one each from Australia, Canada, Chile, Germany, and Russia.

The big preseason news came in March, when the Ohio Valley Conference (OVC) announced the inauguration of a Men's Soccer Championship. Four full members of the OVC would be joined by four associate members. As the Cougars were departing the Missouri Valley Conference, Eastern Illinois, Lindenwood, and Southern Indiana were leaving the Summit League. They were joined by Chicago State, Houston Christian, Incarnate Word, and Liberty.

In May, Western Illinois University joined the Ohio Valley Conference. However, the OVC men's soccer schedule had already been drawn up, including quite a bit of air travel. Also, Western's departure from the Conference of which it was the last remaining charter member would have left the Summit League with only five members for men's soccer, fewer than the six teams required to maintain the conference's automatic bid to the NCAA Tournament. Therefore, Western Illinois will remain in the Summit League for men's soccer for 2023 and join the rest of its teams in the OVC in 2024.

In August, the OVC head coaches and communications directors voted to pick the preseason favorite to win the inaugural OVC Men's Soccer Championship. Teams received 7 points for a first-place votes, 6 for a second-place vote, etc.

2023 OVC Men's Soccer Predicted Order of Finish

1. Liberty (8 first-place votes) – 88 points

2. SIUE (4) – 86

3. Houston Christian (4) – 81

4. Lindenwood – 62

5. Incarnate Word – 53

6. Southern Indiana – 29

7. Eastern Illinois – 25

8. Chicago State – 24

== Regular season ==
The Cougars opened the season visiting Conway, Arkansas to play former MVC rival Central Arkansas, now a member of the ASUN Conference. Just over 13 minutes into the game, Stephen Moreira fired a pass into the box, and UCA was called for a handball. Ignacio "Nacho" Abeal Pou scored on the penalty kick to give SIUE the 1–0 lead that they held through halftime, which was extended 10 minutes when a light standard blacked out. Central Arkansas tied the game in the 62nd minute, but in the 78th minute "Nacho's" pass hit Moreira in the box, and he turned and shot through traffic for the winning goal. The Bears outshot the Cougars 12–10 and 5–4 in shots on goal, but SIUE extended its streak over UCA to 9–0–2 in the last eleven meetings.

SIUE hosted Butler of the Big East Conference in what has become an annual affair. Sam Layton opened the scoring with a header on a corner kick from Mitchell Murphy in the 19th minute. A second Cougar goal was negated in the 32nd minute by an offside call, then Butler tied the score in the 34th minute, with the tie extending through halftime. In the 50th minute, a Butler foul set up SIUE's second penalty kick in two games, and Alsadiq Hasan chipped a shot into the left corner to give the Cougars a 2–1 lead. Six minutes later, Mitchell Murphy stole the ball from the Butler keeper at the top of the box and passed it to Hasan who slid into the empty net for his second goal and the Cougars sixth consecutive home opener win.

Following the opening week's play, the OVC named Aaron Crabtree the Defensive Player of the Week and Sam Gomez the Goalkeeper of the Week.

The 32nd annual Bronze Boot Game versus St. Louis moved to the neutral CityPark (home of St. Louis City SC) and was played before a crowd of 8,574. The Billikens entered the game ranked #15 and carrying a 15–0–2 streak since the Cougars last won the Bronze Boot in 1982. The two teams felt each other out during the scoreless first half. In the 50th minute, Mitchell Murphy took a pass from Andres Delascio and booted it into the net to put SIUE on top 1–0. In the 73rd minute, Nic Muench found himself with the ball 15 yards out and one-on-one with the Bill's goalkeeper. He shot and scored the first goal of his Cougar career to put SIUE up 2–0 and ensure a Cougar win over the Billikens for the first time in 41 years. Sam Gomez kept a "clean sheet" in SIUE's goal, but he had to make a point blank save with three seconds left to secure the shutout. "SIUE is an experienced team and they fought very well," said Kevin Kalish, both Saint Louis U's coach and a former SIUE head coach. "I thought their level of intensity was higher than ours. They were the better team tonight."

As a result of defeating 15th ranked St. Louis the United Soccer Coaches' poll had the Cougars ranked #18 in the NCAA.

After the second week of play, the OVC named Mitchell Murphy the Offensive Player of the Week, Will Harris the Co-Defensive Player of the Week, and again named Sam Gomez the Goalkeeper of the Week. Additionally, Nic Muench was named to the College Soccer News Team of the Week.

Kansas City outshot visiting SIUE 15–7, and both sides had four shots on goal, with both keepers making three saves. The Roos scored at the back post after a counterattack in the 59th minute. “Kansas City is a tough team,” SIUE Head Coach Cale Wassermann said. “We gave up a goal we would like to have back,” he added. With the Cougars trailing 1–0 in the 86th minute, Mitchell Murphy charged into the Roos’ box and was fouled by the goalkeeper. Pavel Dashin made the penalty shot for his first Cougar goal and a 1–1 draw.

SIUE has started the year unbeaten through five games for the first time since 2018, after the Cougars earned a late 1–0 win over Western Illinois. SIUE outshot Western Illinois 15–9 and had an 8–4 advantage in shots on goal, but despite the Cougars' dominance, the score remained knotted at zero until the 80th minute. Then, the Leathernecks failed to completely clear after a corner kick, Stephan Moreira gained control of the ball and passed to Jake Karolczak, whose left-footed strike from 21 yards away curled perfectly into the upper corner for the winning goal. "We played 18 guys tonight," head coach Cale Wassermann said. "We're extremely deep. It helps us in training and helps us rotate some guys. Our goal is to be fresh to the end of games. That's two games in a row where we've scored in the last 10 minutes of a game." Ten different Cougar players took a shot Tuesday and Karolczak became the eighth different player to score a goal for SIUE. This was the Cougars' fourth consecutive win in the series with their in-state and soon-to-be Ohio Valley Conference rival, who fell to 0–5–1 with the loss.

The Cougars gave up an early goal at Bradley when in the sixth minute, a long shot hit the post and came out to the middle of the box, was passed to the penalty spot, and fired into the net. Any chance for SIUE to reply was delayed by an hour and a half time out for a thunderstorm to pass. In the 57th minute, Andres Delascio picked off a clearance near midfield and the ball was passed to Aaron Crabtree, to Alsadiq Hasan, back to Delascio, to Ignacio Abeal Pou on the left side, just outside the box. Nacho worked his way into the box and hit Nic Muench, who headed the ball home from eight yards out for the tying goal and his second of the season. SIUE matched its season high with 15 shots, 11 coming in the second half. "We were a little slow in the attack before the delay," Cougar coach Cale Wassermann said. "In the second half we had chance after chance and just couldn't find the second goal." Bradley took 13 shots, seven on goal, and Sam Gomez tied his career high with six saves in the game.

The OVC awarded Sam Gomez his third Goalkeeper of the Week honor of the season after keeping SIUE undefeated on the season when the team beat Western Illinois and tied Bradley.

The Cougars played Division III Webster University in the final non-conference game. Team co-captain Alsadiq Hasan gave SIUE the lead when he scored a penalty kick after a Webster handball in the box in the 30th minute. The Gorlocks scored in the 53rd minute to knot the score. Twentyseven seconds later, Stephan Moreira took a pass from Bobby Pauly and put SIUE back on top with a shot from the top of the box. Hasan scored his second goal of the game in the 79th minute with a left-footed rocket from 20 yards out; It was his second two-goal game of the season. With SIUE's 3–1 win, the Cougars are in their longest unbeaten streak since 1997.

After the Cougar defense limited Webster to only two shots, Wes Gibson was named OVC Defensive Player of the Week.

In its premier Ohio Valley Conference soccer game, SIUE turned in its highest scoring output since returning to NCAA Division I play, dominating Southern Indiana 6–0 in Evansville. "The boys were awesome tonight," SIUE coach Cale Wassermann said. "We had a good mix of creativity and confidence, and we took smart chances. I liked what we did in possession, and we kept a clean sheet." The Cougar scoring started when SIUE took a ball away from the Southern Indiana backline in the 18th minute, Stephan Moreira passed to Jake Karolczak, who passed to Alsadiq Hasan, who fired in his team-leading fifth goal of the year. Mitchell Murphy made it 2–0 in the 26th minute, again coming after a giveaway, with Karolczak getting his second assist on the goal. Jacob Bilyeu made it 3–0 before halftime when he took a long pass from Pavel Dashin, cut in and scored at the near post. Andres Delascio made it 4–0 eight minutes into the second half with an assist from Moreira, and Delascio struck again twelve and a half minutes later, assisted by Sam Layton's missed shot. In the 80th minute, Connor Gramke scored a penalty kick for his first Cougar goal. SIUE could have scored more, but Hasan tried to get tricky on the USI goalie and had the Cougars' second penalty kick of the game saved. The Cougars played a total of twenty players in the game, and ten different SIUE players recorded at least a goal or an assist. The Cougars outshot the Screaming Eagles 21–2, and Sam Gomez needed to make only one save en route to his third shutout of the season. SIUE remains unbeaten at 6–0–2.

SIUE and Eastern Illinois had met thirty times since 1968, but not in a conference match since 2010. SIUE outshot EIU 19–5, and Cougars' goalkeeper Sam Gomez turned away both Panthers' shots on goal for his and the Cougars' fourth shutout of the year and second in a row to start the conference season. However, SIUE could not find the back of the net for most of the game. "This was a tough game today," head coach Cale Wassermann said. "We were in control, but just couldn't score there for a while. We could have used a little more efficiency to get a goal earlier." Finally, the chance came on the seventh penalty kick awarded to the Cougars in nine games played this season. Ignacio "Nacho" Abeal Pou took the shot, scoring low and to the right of the EIU goalkeeper. "I am happy for Nacho," Wassermann said. "He stepped up in a big moment." About the Cougars many penalty shots, Wassermann said. ""We're pushing teams much more than we have in the past. We're inside the 18-yard box more than we have been in a while."

The Cougars allowed just seven combined shots against Southern Indiana and Eastern Illinois. Wes Gibson was named the OVC Defensive Player of the Week for the second week in a row after he played a team-high 76 minutes and added an assist against USI and played all 90 minutes against EIU. Sam Gomez received his fourth OVC Goalkeeper of the Week honor of the season; he is seventh nationally in save percentage (84.4%), eighth in goals against average (.556) and 15th in shutouts (4).

SIUE and Lindenwood are only 45 miles apart, but the two schools had never met on the soccer pitch before last year. Still, the two seem to have quickly started a serious rivalry. In their second meeting, the Cougars extended their unbeaten streak to ten games, but could only manage a 2–2 draw versus the Lions. Lindenwood was the first team to score more than a single goal on SIUE's stingy defense, and in the 83rd minute, punches were thrown, with a Cougar and a Lion being shown red cards and ejected. SIUE outshot Lindenwood 15–9, but head coach Cale Wassermann said, "It was a hard-fought OVC game to the 90th minute and that's what you have to expect in conference play. I thought we were very good overall. Lindenwood fought hard. They used every trick in the book to slow us down. I credit them for challenging us." Jake Karolczak scored the game's first goal in the 32nd minute when Lindenwood failed to clear a ball from the box, Sam Layton stole it and fed in the assist. Lindenwood equalized three minutes into the second half. In the 55th minute. Karolczak lifted the ball in from the corner of the box, and Mitchel Murphy headed in the goal to make it 2–1. The visitors kept challenging the Cougars and tied up the score on a corner kick in the 70th minute. "It rattled us a little when we conceded," Wassermann added. "I thought we had enough chances to get a third." The two teams kept at it, and the brief fight occurred with only seven minutes remaining. "We expected a little chippyness but it got out of hand," Wassermann said. "It's a shame that there was a little melee and two red cards," Wassermann continued. "But at the same time we learned some good lessons about ourselves and how to control that, should we find ourselves in a similar situation moving forward."

In the first of four consecutive first-ever meetings in Ohio Valley Conference games, the Cougars traveled to Lynchburg, Virginia. With a 2–0 shutout at Liberty, SIUE men's soccer held onto first place in the Ohio Valley Conference and ran its unbeaten streak to 11 games. Mitchell Murphy scored both Cougar goals, opening with a 22-yard strike after a takeaway just 58 seconds into the game. "It was a big moment and came out of us pressing," SIUE head coach Cale Wassermann stated. "Credit to Mitchell. He picked up his head and he picked out that corner." Murphy chased a ball into the box in the 80th minute, was tripped by the Liberty goalkeeper, and was awarded a penalty kick that he blasted home to double the Cougars' lead and seal the SIUE road win. Liberty outshot SIUE 12–9 overall and held an 8–2 lead in shots on goal, but Sam Gomez made a career-high eight saves to post his fifth shutout of the season. "It was a team effort and a big road win," Wassermann said. "They had eight corners and our assistants scouted those great, but it took some brave and disciplined defending from our guys. We had some big blocks and Sam made some big saves."

The OVC named Mitchell Murphy a Co-Offensive Player of the Week for his three goals versus Lindenwood and Liberty. Sam Gomez was awarded his fifth OVC Goalkeeper of the Week award after he played all 180 minutes against Lindenwood and Liberty, allowing only two goals and making 12 saves. Gomez had his fifth shutout of the season against Liberty, and he ranks fourth nationally in save percentage (84.8%) and 10th in goals against average (.636).

The first-ever meet between the SIUE and Incarnate Wood men's soccer teams was between two sides tied for first place in the Ohio Valley Conference. The Cougar's three goals were all scored after the two teams played to a scoreless halftime draw, with the visiting Cardinals outshooting SIUE 4–3. "It was a quiet first half," Cougars head coach Cale Wassermann said. "It was a little bit of a feeling out period. Both teams played a little conservative. We were certainly a little more lively with energetic combinations; and were more aggressive in the attack in the second half, and it paid off." Jake Karolczak put the Cougars ahead in the 53rd minute, taking a pass from Andres Dealscio and nertting a shot from near the top of the box. Karolczak got a second strike in the 70th minute, when he blasted in a pass from Jacob Bilyeu to the near post over the UIW goalkeeper. With just over three minutes left in the game, Pavel Dashin corralled a long pass from Bilyeu, shifted the ball from his right to his left foot, and netted it cleanly. Shots were even at 11–11; the Cougars put eight shots on goal to the Cardinal's five. Sam Gomez made five saves, and he and the Cougars earned their sixth "clean sheet" shutout of the season and their fourth in OVC play. SIUE's win made it an even dozen games without a defeat, and they took over sole possession of first place in the conference, running their record to 9–0–3 overall and 4–0–1 in the OVC. The nine wins are the most in a season under Cale Wassermann and the program's most since 2018.

As expected, the largest home crowd of the season turned out for Homecoming. There were 2,394 fans in the Korte Stadium stands and hundreds more on the admission-free east side berm. It was an exciting first-time meeting between SIUE and Houston Christian, despite the teams playing on only two days rest in order to play a Saturday night game for Homecoming. The Cougars came out pressing, and Jacob Bilyeu scored only 2:03 into the game, with assists from Alsadiq Hasan and Jake Karolczak. "It helps when you get a goal early again," SIUE coach Cale Wassermann said. "We pressed and it was a quick combination play from Karolczak and Sadiq that gave us a quick start and a massive result." In the 40th minute, Will Harris headed home a corner kick from Stephan Moreira to give the Cougars a 2–0 halftime lead. Pavel Dashin gave SIUE a 3–0 advantage in the 49th minute. Ignacio "Nacho" Abeal Pou carried into the box where he was upended; before the foul could be called against HCU, Dashin, had fired the ball into the net from 18 yards out. After falling so far behind, the Huskies stepped up their offense hard, pushing the Cougars again and again. They managed to cut the deficit to 3–1 in the 74th minute, when a deflection slipped past a diving and visibly upset SIUE goalkeeper Sam Gomez. "Obviously we wanted to keep the clean sheet," Wassermann stated. "Our third gave us the ability to finish the game in relative comfort, even though they were definitely pushing us." SIUE outshot HCU in the game 15–10. Gomez made six saves for the Cougars, while the Huskies' goalie made five. SIUE remains unbeaten at 10–0–3 and has 10 wins for the first time since the 2016 season and only the fourth time since returning to Division I play in 2008. The Cougars are 5–0–1 in the Ohio Valley Conference.

After beating both Texas OVC teams and moving into sole possession of first place, the Cougars swept the conference Players of the Week awards. Jake Karolczak was named Offensive Player of the Week for scoring two goals and having an assist in the two games. Will Harris earned his second Defensive Player of the Week for playing all 180 minutes and anchoring the defense that yielded only one goal; additionally, Harris scored the winning goal against Houston Christian. Sam Gomez also played all 180 minutes and saved 11 of 12 shots on goal; this was the sixth time this season (and third week in a row) that Gomez earned the Goalkeeper of the Week award.

On the Top Drawer Men's Midseason Top 100 Players, SIUE goalkeeper Sam Gomez was #54.

A steady rain made for slippery going on improving Chicago State's borrowed blue turf field. "It was tough," SIUE coach Cale Wassermann said. "It was windy, there was a lot of rain. Our guys grinded it out." In the 37th minute, Pavel Dashin tapped in the rebound of Will Harris' shot off Alsadiq Hasan's free kick. It was Dashin's fourth goal of the season, and both Hasan and Harris were credited with assists. Chicago State looked to have tied the game on a free kick just before halftime, but was charged with a handball foul to negate the goal. The home Cougars pressed hard in the second half, with extended presence in the visiting Cougars defensive end of the field. This paid off when, in the 80th minute, a ball went through the box, and a shot missed at the back post but was netted at the opposite post. "Give Chicago State credit they had a distinct counterattack," Wassermann said. After being tied, it was SIUE that put on the pressure. Four minutes after the home team's goal and with just over six minutes to play, on a run up the left side, Seth Korenek was fouled. Stephan Moreira took the free kick from 30 yards out, off the left side of the box, and bent it in for the winning goal. "What a response after (Chicago State's) goal," coach Wassermann said. "He hit it as hard as he could, upper corner." It was SIUE's fourth win in a row, and they remain unbeaten on the year at 11–0–3 overall and 6–0–1 in the Ohio Valley Conference. The 11 wins are the most for the Cougars since 2015.

The first half of SIUE's game against Southern Indiana was scoreless, despite the Cougars dominating and three balls finding the back of the net; two handballs and a foul negated the goals. In the second half, four different players scored, and SIUE claimed the inaugural Ohio Valley Conference regular season title and stayed unbeaten on the year. "Amazing day," Cougars coach Cale Wassermann said. "The players earned every bit of this. I am extremely proud of the effort and execution." The title is the first regular season conference title for men's soccer since the 2015 team won the Missouri Valley Conference regular season. "Our guys have shown up every day and taken care of details," Wassermann said. "We still have a lot to play for with two games left in the regular season." Jacob Bilyeu started the scoring in the 63rd minute with assists from Nic Muench and Stephan Moreira. Just over a minute later, Moreira made it 2–0, with his second goal of the week, assisted by Bilyeu and Will Harris. In the 81st minute, Jacobo Sanfeliu scored his first as a Cougar, aided by Muench and Colin Bastianoni. Pavel Dashin rounded out the scoring, also assisted by Muench and Bastianoni--- that made three assists for Nic Muench in the game. The Cougars outshot USI 21–6, putting 13 shots on goal. Southern Indiana had three shots on goal, and Sam Gomez made saves on all three for his seventh shutout of the season. With the 4–0 victory, the Cougars improved to 12–0–3 overall and 7–0–1 in the OVC. The championship is the first OVC Championship of any kind for a men's team at SIUE.

After the Cougars won two more games and clinched the inaugural OVC Regular Season Championship, Stephan Moreira was rewarded for his two goals and an assist which included the winning goal against Chicago State and an assist on the winning goal versus Southern Indiana by becoming the third SIUE player to be named the OVC Offensive Player of the Week. Will Harris earned his second-straight and third overall OVC Defensive Player of the Week honor of the season for playing 171 of 180 minutes for a defense that allowed only one goal. Harris also added an assist in each match. Additionally, Stephan Moreira was named to the College Soccer News Team of the Week.

After not ranking them all season, the October 22 College Soccer News Men's Top 30 had the Cougars ranked #29.

After scoring goals against both Chicago State and Southern Indiana, Pavel Dashin was named the Prairie Farms Cougar of the Week. Dashin, a graduate student is tied for the team lead with five goals this season. Prairie Farms Dairy, a major supporter of Cougar athletics has recently begun honoring an SIUE student-athlete who demonstrated excellence in competition. Dashin is the first member of the men's soccer team to be honored.

SIUE won its sixth consecutive game, shutting out Lindenwood 1–0; the Cougars remain unbeaten at 13–0–3 and 8–0–1 in Ohio Valley Conference play. The 13 wins are the most in the NCAA Division I, and the six-game winning streak is the longest current streak in Division I. "It was a good performance all around," SIUE coach Cale Wassermann said. "Lindenwood pushed us. They work hard." It was a defensive struggle. and was scoreless into the second half. As the Cougars offense made a hard push in the 58th minute, the Lions committed a foul in the box. Stephan Moreira stepped up, and his penalty kick was the only goal of the match. Moreira has scored in three straight games, and he is one of four Cougars is tied for the team lead with five goals. "We told the team at half, if we continue to attack the way we were, a goal was going to come," Wassermann added. SIUE was outshot 10–8, but the Cougars picked up their eighth shutout of the year, with goalkeeper Sam Gomez making four saves, some at point-blank range. "He made some big saves and some big punches and was good in his distribution," Wassermann said of the SIUE goalkeeper. "Sam Gomez proved to everyone here that he is one of the best goalkeepers in the country."

Jack Blake was a talented soccer player. Blake played for the Cougars from 1969 to 1972 and in 1970 was an All-American. From SIUE, Blake went on to play for the Pan-American Soccer Team in 1971 and the U.S. Olympic Team in 1972. He is a member of the SIUE Athletics Hall of Fame. In 1997, Blake's friend and teammate Tim Tighe, and his wife, Lynn, spearheaded the campaign to establish the Jack Blake Award, which has become SIUE men's soccer's most prestigious award and is awarded to the most well-rounded player displaying strong dedication, leadership, fitness and intensity on and off the field. The 2023 Jack Blake Award was presented to senior midfielder Alsadiq Hasan, who now calls St. Louis home, after he and his family emigrated to the U.S. from Baghdad, Iraq just before he started high school. After playing for two seasons at Quincy, Hasan transferred to SIUE.

Versus Eastern Illinois, Pavel Dashin helped the Cougars record the first undefeated regular season since the 1972 National Championship team by scoring SIUE's first "hat trick" since 2004. Dashin started the scoring in the 33rd minute when Aaron Crabtree hit Sebastian Borquez with a perfect cross-field pass that Borquez forwarded to a charging Dashin for the goal. The score remained 1–0 through halftime and until the 53rd minute. This time, Will Harris hit Borquez, who hit the charging Dashin for the second score. Less than a minute and a half later, there was a flurry of activity in the box, and Sam Layton assisted on the hat trick goal. In the 65th minute, Ignacio Abeal Pou and Stephan Moreira set up Andres Delascio for the final Cougar goal. As SIUE coach Cale Wassermann was working more than twenty players in and out of the game, a Panther took the ball and took off on a breakaway. One-on-one, there was nothing an angered Sam Gomez could do to stop the only EIU shot on goal. SIUE is now 14–0–3 overall and finished the first-ever Ohio Valley Conference season 9–0–1. The 14 wins lead the NCAA Division I, and it is the most for an SIUE team since returning to Division I play. The Cougars have also won seven straight games, which is the longest winning streak in Division I.

After SIUE finished the regular season undefeated, the United Soccer Coaches' poll had the Cougars ranked #25 in the NCAA. The Cougars were also again ranked #29 on the October 29 College Soccer News Men's Top 30.

For his hat trick against Eastern Illinois, Pavel Dashin was named the OVC Offensive Player of the Week.

While sitting and waiting for the OVC Tournament, the Cougars moved up to #24 in the United Soccer Coaches poll and to #27 in the College Soccer News poll.

== Postseason ==
SIUE hosted the inaugural Ohio Valley Men's Soccer Tournament at Ralph Korte Stadium October 5–11, 2023. The top six finishers in the regular season qualified for the tournament.

At a banquet held the night before the OVC Championship semifinals were held, the Ohio Valley Conference announced the inaugural OVC men's soccer award winners and All-Conference teams. The Cougars' head coach Cale Wassermann was named OVC Coach of the Year, and three of his players were presented individual awards. Stephan Moreira was named the OVC Forward of the Year, Sam Gomez was tabbed the OVC Goalkeeper of the Year, and Will Harris was designated the OVC Defender of the Year, and the three were all named to the All-OVC First Team. Additionally, defender Wes Gibson, midfielders Sam Layton and Alsadiq Hasan, and forward Pavel Dashin made the All-OVC Second Team, with Moreira and Dashin also placed on the OVC All-Newcomer Team.

"Amazing. I can’t explain it with words. It was an amazing night. Not for me, but for the win, for the team.” So said Ignacio "Nacho" Abeal Pou after scoring two goals to lead SIUE to Saturday night's inaugural Ohio Valley Conference men's soccer championship game. The 25th ranked Cougars downed Lindenwood 2–0 and improved their "still unbeaten" record to 15–0–3. SIUE, the top-seeded team and hosts of the tournament will face the second-seeded Incarnate Word Cardinals at Ralph Korte Stadium. "We have a lot of pride in this group," SIUE coach Cale Wassermann said. "We want to make our alums happy, our fans happy. We are just thrilled to be in the position we are in, but we want the next one. We want the trophy on Saturday." The Cougars had possession of the ball much of the time, while seeking a crack in the Lion's defense. Lindenwood kept trying to find a way to break loose. In the 70th minute, Sam Layton sailed a picture perfect pass from the right side of the midfield to Abeal Pou on the left wing. "Nacho" settled the ball with a defender practically on his back, spun free, and headed south, speeding past another defender. That put him one-on-one with the goalkeeper, and "Nacho" fired a shot into the right side of the goal to give SIUE a 1–0 lead. SIUE held possession for most of the rest of the game, sometime obviously staling to let the clock run out. In the 87th minute, the Cougars were killing time with the ball in Lindenwood's corner. Then a backheel pass sent the ball to Andres Delascio who got the ball to the penalty box right in front of the goal, where "Nacho" fired it past the diving Lions goalkeeper. "I already told Dre (Delascio) that was his goal," Abeal Pou said. "He did an amazing job there." Holding a 2–0 lead, the Cougars relaxed and let time run out on their nearest conference neighbors.

After scoring both goals in the OVC Tournament semifinal versus Lindenwood, Ignacio Abeal Pou became the second member of the Cougars men's soccer team to be named the Prairie Farms Cougar of the Week. Abeal Pou, known as "Nacho". is a junior midfielder from A Coruña, Spain.

Already ranked #24 in the most recent United Soccer Coaches poll and #27 in the CollegeSoccerNews.com Top 30, the Cougars also entered the TopDrawer College Soccer National Ranking at #25.

After scoring twice in the semifinal match, a charging Ignacio "Nacho" Abeal Pou took a pass from Stephan Moreira across the top of the box and fired a rocket into the top corner of the net. It was the only goal of the game, sealing the Cougars' 1–0 victory over Incarnate Word. It earned the host team the inaugural Ohio Valley Conference Championship after winning the regular season title. It also gives the Cougars the league's automatic berth to the NCAA Division I National Tournament--- SIUE's 16th berth in the tournament. "This was like icing on the cake," SIUE coach Cale Wassermann said. "To win the OVC regular season championship and now the tournament is special – and it took a special goal to make it happen." The Cougars improved their unbeaten season's record to 16–0–3. The Cougars now have 10 shutouts, including both tournament games. In the Final, they outshot UIW 12–7 overall and 6–1 in shots on goal. SIUE goalie Sam Gomez needed to make just one save.

After SIUE won the inaugural Ohio Valley Conference Men's Soccer Tournament Championship, Cougar forward Ignacio Abeal Pou was named the tournament's Most Valuable Player. "Nacho" was joined on the 2023 OVC Men's Soccer All-Tournament Team by teammates, goalkeeper Sam Lopez, midfielder Sam Layton, and defender Aaron Crabtree.

The NCAA announced the 48 team field and the bracket for the 2023 NCAA Division I Men's Soccer Championship on Monday November 13. SIUE, the holder of the first Ohio Valley Conference Automatic Qualifier bid were slated to play the Memphis Tigers on Thursday November 16 in Memphis, Tennessee. The winner will advance to face the third seeded North Carolina Tar Heels.

After winning the OVC tournament, the Cougars moved up to #21 in the College Soccer News Men's Top 30 Regular Season Ending Poll and to #22 in the TopDrawer College Soccer National Ranking.

For his "huge three goal performance in the Ohio Valley Conference Tournament," Ignacio "Nacho" Abeal Pou was named to the College Soccer News Men's Team of the Week.

In the NCAA tournament game at Memphis, the Cougars got off to a slow start, but the Tigers came out hot. Lineker Rodrigues dos Santos, the American Athletic Conference's Offensive Player of the Year scored in the 9th minute when he headed the second of consecutive crosses in front of the goal past a diving Sam Gomez. In the 27th minute, he capitalized on a teammate's long run down the right side of the field, receiving a pass in the middle of the box and slamming it past a frustrated Gomez and into the net. "Memphis was really good the first 15–20 minutes," SIUE coach Cale Wassermann exclaimed. "They were looking to counter, and we weren't as sharp to start the game. After the first 20 minutes I thought we were good, but it's difficult when you're chasing the game." After falling two goals behind and taking no shots to Memphis' nine, the Cougars that had carved out an undefeated season showed up and were credited with the last three shots of the half. The Cougars' pressure continued after halftime. In the 61st minute. Pavel Dashin took control of a 50–50 ball that Will Harris had served his way and made a run to the top of the box. He was one-on-one with the Memphis goalkeeper who came off his line, and he slotted home his ninth goal of the year, cutting the Tigers' lead to only 2–1. "He's a mature, savvy player," Wassermann said of Dashin. "He uses his body well. He came off the bench and played well in the first, so we started him in the second half, and it paid off." Things took a turn for the worse less than three minutes after Dashin's goal. Memphis got a breakaway, with Rodrigues dos Santos charging toward the Cougars goal. Gomez came out to challenge the attack but contacted more player than ball and was shown a red card by the referee. Alvaro Bazaco Camino came on as goalkeeper for the final 26 minutes while SIUE played a man down. The Cougars continued to press the Tiger hard, but it was tough going with only ten versus eleven, and Memphis held on for the 2–1 win. "Even down a man, our guys kept pushing; giving every ounce of energy," Wassermann said. In the end, Memphis outshot SIUE only 13–10, with both teams having six shots on goal. Gomez made three saves and Bazaco Camino was credited with one. "I just want to give a big thank you to all that supported us all year, as we were able to turn a corner," Wassermann concluded. "That includes the parents, the community, the other programs and staff at SIUE. And especially thank you to our student-athletes, who gave everything for SIUE."

== Honors ==
On December 1, the United Soccer Coaches announced that SIUE head Coach Cale Wassermann and assistant coaches Jordan Grant and Jaxsen Wirth had been named the NCAA North Region Coaching Staff of the Year through a vote of their peers.

Ignacio Abeal Pou (A Coruña, Spain) and Sam Layton (Brisbane, Australia) were recognized for their success on the field and in the classroom, with both players being named to the 2023 Academic All-District® Men's Soccer Team as selected by the College Sports Communicators (CSC).

On December 5, the United Soccer Coaches announced the NCAA All-Region Teams. Senior defender Will Harris (Coventry, England) was named to the NCAA Division I Men's All-North Region First Team, becoming the first Cougar to be named to the First Team since 2016. Senior midfielder Sam Layton (Brisbane, Australia) and junior forward Stephan Moreira (Colchester, England) were selected for the NCAA Division I Men's All-North Region Second Team, while senior goalkeeper Sam Gomez (St. Louis, Missouri) was named to the NCAA Division I Men's All-North Region Third Team.) Being placed on the All-Region Team is a prerequisite for being named an All-American.

== Coaches ==
Hired just in time to lead the Cougars through the COVID-19 pandemic, Cale Wassermann is in his fifth season as SIUE's eighth head coach. His record through four years was 24–29–8.

Jordan Grant is in his second season as a Cougars' assistant coach.

Jaxsen Wirth joined the Cougars as an assistant and goalkeepers coach just before the 2023 season opened.

== Roster ==
Source=

Buff background indicates returning players from 2022. Pink background indicates players "redshirted" in 2022.

#	Name	Nationality	Height	Weight	Class	Hometown	High School	Academy/Club	Transfer from
Goalkeepers
1	Sam Gomez*	(United States)	6'1"	180	Graduate Student	Webster Groves, Missouri	Webster Groves High School	St. Louis Scott Gallagher Elite	Syracuse
29	Ethan Kornas	(United States)	5'11"	150	Redshirt Freshman	Huntley, Illinois	Huntley High School	Eclipse Soccer Club	
30	Alvaro Bazaco Camino	(Spain)	6'2"	170	Junior	Madrid, Spain		Atletico Madrid Academy	
31	Danny Fischer (redshirt)	(United States)	6'	175	Freshman	Ladue, Missouri	Ladue Horton Watkins High School	St. Louis Scott Gallagher and Charleston Battery (USL).	
Defenders
5	Archie McDonnell (redshirt)	(England)	6'4"	187	Freshman	Leeds, England	St Mary's Menston	UFCA and Horsforth St. Margaret's	
6	Will Harris	(England)	6'4"	180	Senior	Coventry, England			Indiana Tech
12	Aaron Crabtree	(England)	5'11"	170	Senior	Manchester, England	St Bede's College	Wolverhampton Wanderers FC's Category One Academy	
15	Bobby Pauly	(United States)	6'	165	Freshman	St. Charles, Missouri	Orchard Farm High School	St. Louis Scott Gallagher	
19	Nic Muench	(Germany)	6'1"	167	Junior	Heidelberg, Germany	Gymnasium Englisches Insutiut		Mercyhurst University
24	Wes Gibson	(United States)	6'1"	180	Redshirt Junior	Morton, Illinois	Morton High School	Central Illinois United	
27	Garrison Hill	(United States)	6'2"	175	Redshirt Freshman	Kansas City, Missouri	The Pembroke Hill School	Sporting Blue Valley SC	
28	Colin Bastianoni	(United States)	6'	170	Redshirt Freshman	Naperville, Illinois	Metea Valley High School	Eclipse Soccer Club	Missouri State
Midfielders
4	Sam Layton	(Australia)	6'2"	175	Senior	Brisbane, Australia		Burnley Youth Academy	
8	Andres Delascio	(Canada)	5'11"	160	Senior	Milton, Ontario, Canada	Holy Trinity Catholic		
11	Stephan Moreira	(England)	5'10"	150	Junior	Colchester, England		Aldershot Town FC	Bryan College
14	Seth Korenek	(United States)	5'10"	175	Graduate Student	Corpus Christi, Texas			Tulsa
16	Alsadiq Hasan*	(United States)	5'10"	165	Graduate Student	St. Louis County, Missouri	Lindbergh High School	St. Louis Scott Gallagher Elite	Quincy University
20	Zach Renz	(United States)		165	Sophomore	Wentzville, Missouri	Timberland	St. Louis Scott Gallagher Elite	
22	Jake Karolczak	(United States)	5'10"	165	Redshirt Sophomore	St. Charles, Missouri	St. Dominic High School		
Forwards
7	Jacobo Sanfeliu	(Spain)	6'1"	190	Junior	Barcelona, Spain		FC Martinec	Sterling College
9	Pavel Dashin	(Russia)	6'2"	185	Graduate Student	Krasnodar, Russia		FC Krasnodar	Reinhardt University
10	Mitchell Murphy	(United States)	6'1"	170	Graduate Student	Quincy. Illinois	Quincy Notre Dame		SMU
17	Jacob Bilyeu	(United States)	6'2"	155	Graduate Student	Oakville, Missouri	Oakville High School		
18	Connor Gramke	(United States)	6'	180	Junior	Edwardsville, Illinois	Edwardsville High School		Tulsa
21	Ignacio Abeal Pou	(Spain)	5'9"	160	Junior	A Coruña, Spain			Jefferson College
23	Sebastian Borquez	(Chile)	5'4"	145	Graduate Student	Santiago, Chile		Chilean U18 National Team	University of Rio Grande

- (redshirt) = Players "redshirted' for the 2023 season.
- * = Captains

== Schedule and results ==
Source =

Visiting team on the left, home team on the right. Rankings from United Soccer Coaches polls.

=== Exhibitions ===
August 13, 2023	Memphis	v	SIUE	Edwardsville, Illinois
7:00 PM		[ ]		Stadium: Ralph Korte Stadium

August 18, 2023	Indiana Wesleyan	2–3	SIUE	Edwardsville, Illinois
7:00 PM				Stadium: Ralph Korte Stadium

=== Regular season ===
August 24, 2023	SIUE	2–1	Central Arkansas	Conway, Arkansas
8:00 PM	Abeal Pou 14' (pen.); Moreira 78' (Abeal Pou)		Fontana	Stadium: Bill Stephens Complex; Attendance: 427

August 27, 2023	Butler	1–3	SIUE	Edwardsville, Illinois
7:00 PM	Ault 34' (Palmer)		Layton 19' (Murphy); Hasan 50' (pen.); Hasan 56' (Delascio)	Stadium: Ralph Korte Stadium; Attendance: 238; Referee: Velimir Milovic

September 2, 2023	SIUE	2–0	#15 St. Louis	Saint Louis, Missouri
7:30 PM	Murphy 50' (Delascio); Muench 73' (Layton)			Stadium: CityPark; Attendance: 8,574; Referee: Matthew Geringer
Note: Bronze Boot Game

September 8, 2023	#18 SIUE	1–1	Kansas City	Kansas City, Missouri
7:30 PM	Dashin 85' (pen.)		Hoelting	Stadium: Durwood Soccer Stadium; Attendance: 301; Referee: Kyle Armstrong

September 12, 2023	Western Illinois	0–1	SIUE	Edwardsville, Illinois
7:00 PM			Karolczak 80' (Moreira)	Stadium: Ralph Korte Stadium; Attendance: 209; Referee: Matthew Rodman

September 16, 2023	SIUE	1–1	Bradley	Peoria, Illinois
7:00 PM	Muench 57' (Abeal Pou)		Mejias 6' (Koulai)	Stadium: Shea Stadium; Attendance: 415; Referee: Eulogio Villalpando

September 22, 2023	Webster	1–3	SIUE	Edwardsville, Illinois
7:00 PM	Thomas 53' (Llamas)		Hasan 30' (pen.); Moreira 53' (Pauly); Hasan 78'	Stadium: Ralph Korte Stadium; Attendance: 326; Referee: Braeden Frey

September 28, 2023	SIUE	6–0	Southern Indiana*	Evansville, Indiana
7:00 PM	Hasan; Murphy 26' (Karolczak); Bilyeu; Delascio 53' (Moreira); Delascio 66' (Layton); Gramke 81' (pen.)			Stadium: Strassweg Field; Attendance: 160; Referee: Saleem Abufares

October 1, 2023	SIUE	1–0	Eastern Illinois*	Charleston, Illinois
1:00 PM	Abeal Pou 76' (pen.)			Stadium: Lakeside Soccer Field; Attendance: 159; Referee: Besnik Rexhepi

October 5, 2023	Lindenwood*	2–2	SIUE	Edwardsville, Illinois
7:30 PM	Wilson 48' (Francombe); Wackerfuss 70' (Wackerfuss)	Report]	Karolczak 32' (Layton); Murphy 55' (Karolczak)	Stadium: Ralph Korte Stadium; Attendance: 787; Referee: Tim Wagner

October 8, 2023	SIUE	2–0	Liberty*	Lynchburg, Virginia
12:00 PM	Murphy 1'; Murphy 80' (pen.)			Stadium: Osborne Stadium; Attendance: 262; Referee: Mike Stutt

October 12, 2023	Incarnate Word*	0–3	SIUE	Edwardsville, Illinois
6:00 PM			Karolczak 53' (Delascio); Karolczak 70' (Bilyeu); Dashin 87'	Stadium: Ralph Korte Stadium; Attendance: 253; Referee: Ellsworth

October 14, 2023	Houston Christian*	1–3	SIUE	Edwardsville, Illinois
7:00 PM	Garddia 74' (Velasco)		Bilyeu; Harris 40' (Moreira); Dashin 49' (Abeal)	Stadium: Ralph Korte Stadium; Attendance: 2,394; Referee: Matthew Geringer
Note: HOMECOMING

October 19, 2023	SIUE	2–1	Chicago State*	Chicago, Illinois
7:30 PM	Dashin; Moreira 84'		Topete 80' (Sergiev)	Stadium: Gwendolyn Brooks College Prep; Attendance: 50

October 22, 2023	Southern Indiana*	0–4	SIUE	Edwardsville, Illinois
5:00 PM			Bilyeu; Moreira; Sanfeliu dashin	Stadium: Ralph Korte Stadium; Attendance: 574; Referee: Bilyeu; Moreira; Sanfeliu dashin

October 26, 2023	SIUE	1–0	Lindenwood*	St. Charles, Missouri
7:00 PM	Moreira 58' (pen.)			Stadium: Harlen C. Hunter Stadium; Attendance: 237; Referee: Andy Ellsworth

October 29, 2023	Eastern Illinois*	1–4	SIUE	Edwardsville, Illinois
1:00 PM	Skinner 77'		Dashin; Dashin; Dashin 54' (Layton); Delascio	Stadium: Ralph Korte Stadium; Attendance: 321; Referee: Edvin Jurisevic
Note: Senior Day

- * = Ohio Valley Conference opponent.

=== Post-season ===
2023 Ohio Valley Conference men's soccer tournament

November 8, 2023 Semifinals	Lindenwood	0–2	#24 SIUE	Edwardsville, Illinois
6:00 PM			Abeal Pou 70' (Layton); Abeal Pou 87' (Delascio)	Stadium: Ralph Korte Stadium; Attendance: 724; Referee: Andrew Ellsworth

November 11, 2023 Finals	Incarnate Word	0–1	#24 SIUE	Edwardsville, Illinois
6:00 PM			Abeal Pou	Stadium: Ralph Korte Stadium; Attendance: 1,337; Referee: Dimitrios Katsimingos

NCAA Division I men's soccer tournament

November 16, 2023 1st round	#24 SIUE	1–2	Memphis	Memphis, TN
7:00 PM	Dashin 61'; Gomez (red card) 64'		Rodrigues dos Santos 9' (Bordoy); Rodrigues dos Santos 27' (Bokota)	Stadium: Memphis Soccer & Track Stadium; Attendance: 1,029; Referee: Dorian Del Toro

== Statistics ==
- Through Memphis game of 11/16

Player	Goals	Assists	Points
Pavel Dashin	9	1	19
Stephan Moreira	5	7	17
Ignacio Abeal Pou	5	4	14
Jake Karolczak	4	5	13
Alsadiq Hasan	5	2	12
Mitchell Murphy	5	1	11
Andres Delascio	3	5	11
Jacob Bilyeu	3	3	9
Sam Layton	1	6	8
Nic Muench	2	3	7
Will Harris	1	3	5
Connor Gramke	1	0	2
Jacobo Sanfeliu	1	0	2
Colin Bastianoni	0	2	2
Sebastian Borquez	0	2	2
Wes Gibson	0	1	1
Bobby Pauly	0	1	1
SIUE Cougars	44	46	134

Field Players
#	Name	Games	Starts	Minutes	Goals	Assists	Points	Shots	Shot %age	Shots On Goal	OG %age	Yellow/Red cards	Game Winners	Penalty Goals/Kicks
1	Sam Gomez	20	20	1767	0	0	0	0	0.000	0	0.000	0–1	0	0–0
4	Sam Layton	19	17	1301	1	6	8	12	.083	5	.455	6–0	0	0–0
6	Will Harris	20	20	1735	1	3	5	14	.071	6	.429	2–0	1	0–0
7	Jacobo Sanfeliu	5	0	66	1	0	2	5	0.200	4	.800	0–0	0	0–0
8	Andres Delascio	20	11	1174	3	5	11	15	.200	7	.467	2–0	0	0–0
9	Pavel Dashin	19	4	638	9	1	19	17	.529	12	.706	3–1	1	1–1
10	Mitchell Murphy	12	11	727	5	1	11	33	.152	19	.576	2–0	2	1–1
11	Stephan Moreira	20	18	1297	5	7	17	41	.122	20	.488	0–0	4	1–1
12	Aaron Crabtree	18	17	1418	0	0	0	7	0.000	2	.286	5–0	0	0–0
14	Seth Korenek	20	20	1460	0	0	0	6	0.000	2	.333	3–0	0	0–0
15	Bobby Pauly	20	1	567	0	1	1	1	0.000	1	1.000	0–0	0	0–0
16	Alsadiq Hasan	20	15	1361	5	2	12	28	.179	16	.571	1–0	2	2–3
17	Jacob Bilyeu	20	9	830	3	3	9	13	.231	8	.615	0–0	1	0–0
18	Connor Gramke	12	0	191	1	0	2	3	.333	2	.667	0–0	0	1–1
19	Nic Muench	20	12	1081	2	3	7	11	.182	6	.545	2–0	0	0–0
20	Zach Renz	8	0	120	0	0	0	0	0.000	0	0.000	0–0	0	0–0
21	Ignacio Abeal Pou	20	15	1162	5	4	14	40	.125	23	.575	2–0	3	2–2
22	Jake Karolczak	20	13	954	4	5	13	18	.222	7	.389	2–0	2	0–0
23	Sebastian Borquez	12	1	287	0	2	2	6	0.000	3	.500	1–0	0	0–0
25	Wes Gibson	19	16	1411	0	1	1	0	0.000	0	0.000	2–0	0	0–0
27	Garrison Hill	2	0	21	0	0	0	0	0.000	0	0.000	0–0	0	0–0
28	Colin Bastianoni	9	0	110	0	2	2	1	0.000	0	0.000	0–0	0	0–0
30	Alvaro Bazaco Camino	2	0	33	0	0	0	0	0.000	0	0.000	0–0	0	0–0
	Totals	20	---	19,776	45	46	137	271	.166	143	.528	36–2	16	8–9
	Opponents	20	---	19,793	12	12	36	175	.069	79	.451	36–2	1	0–0

Goalkeepers
#	Name	Games	Starts	Minutes	Goals allowed	GA Ave.	Saves	Save %	Wins	Loses	Ties	Shutouts
1	Sam Gomez	20	20	1766:41	12	.61	65	.844	16	1	3	10
30	Alvaro Bazaco Camino	2	0	33:19	0	.00	1	1.000	0	0	0	0
	Totals	20	---	1800:00	12	.60	66	.846	16	1	3	10
	Opponents	20	---	1800.00	45	2.25	96	.681	1	16	3	0

Additional stats	Corner kicks	Offsides	Fouls	Goals/game
SIUE	111	n/a	221	2.25
Opponents	69	n/a	190	0.60
