= Ohio Valley Conference men's soccer tournament =

US college soccer tournament

OVC men's soccer tournament
- Ohio Valley Conference men's soccer tournament
- Ohio Valley Conference logo
- Sport: College soccer
- Conference: Ohio Valley Conference
- Number of teams: 6
- Format: Single-elimination
- Played: 2023–present
- Last contest: 2026
- Current champion: Houston Christian (1st title)
- Most championships: SIU Edwardsville (2)
- TV partner: ESPN+
- Official website: ovcsports.com/sports/msoc

The OVC men's soccer tournament is the conference championship tournament in college soccer for the Ohio Valley Conference (OVC). It is a single-elimination tournament, and seeding is based on regular season records. The winner, declared conference champion, receives the conference's automatic bid to the NCAA Division I men's soccer championship.

The inaugural tournament was 2023, with SIU Edwardsville winning their first title.

== Champions ==
=== Finals ===
Key

- (1) – Title number
- a.e.t. – Match went to extra time
- p – Match decided by a penalty shootout after extra time
- – Winning team won regular season

=== By year ===
Ed.	Year	Champion	Score	Runner-up	Venue	City	Tournament MVP	Ref.
1	2023	SIU Edwardsville (1)	1–0	Incarnate Word	Korte Stadium	Edwardsville, IL	Ignacio Abeal, SIUE	
2	2024	SIU Edwardsville (2)	3–2 (a.e.t.)	Houston Christian	Korte Stadium	Edwardsville, IL	Nic Muench, SIUE	
3	2025	Lindenwood (1)	1–1 (4–2 p)	Houston Christian	Harlen Hunter Stadium	St. Charles, MO	Luca Bartoni, Lindenwood	
4	2026	Houston Christian (1)	2–2 (6–5 p)	Eastern Illinois	Harlen Hunter Stadium	St. Charles, MO	Harvey Heeps, Houston Christian	

=== Statistics ===
Through 2026

School	Apps	W	L	T	Pct	Titles	Title years
Chicago State	1	0	1	0	.000		
Eastern Illinois	3	2	2	2	.500		
Houston Christian	3	3	1	3	.643	1	2026
Incarnate Word	2	1	2	0	.333		
Liberty	3	1	2	1	.375		
Lindenwood	4	3	3	1	.500	1	2025
SIU Edwardsville	4	5	2	0	.714	2	2023, 2024
Southern Indiana	0	–	–	–	–		
UTRGV	0	–	–	–	–		
Western Illinois	3	0	2	1	.167		

Teams in italics no longer sponsor men's soccer in the OVC.

=== Titles by school ===
School	Titles	Championship years
SIU Edwardsville	2	2023, 2024
Houston Christian	1	2026
Lindenwood	1	2025
