= Southern Indiana Screaming Eagles men's basketball statistical leaders =

The Southern Indiana Screaming Eagles men's basketball statistical leaders are individual statistical leaders of the Southern Indiana Screaming Eagles men's basketball program in various categories, including points, assists, blocks, rebounds, and steals. Within those areas, the lists identify single-game, single-season, and career leaders. The Screaming Eagles represent the University of Southern Indiana in the NCAA's Ohio Valley Conference.

Southern Indiana began competing in intercollegiate basketball in 1970. The NCAA did not officially record assists as a stat until the 1983–84 season, and blocks and steals until the 1985–86 season, but Southern Indiana's record books includes players in these stats before these seasons. These lists are updated through the end of the 2021–22 season.

== Scoring ==
Career
Rk	Player	Points	Seasons
1	Alex Stein	2,219	2015–16 2016–17 2017–18 2018–19
2	Stephen Jackson	2,216	1983–84 1984–85 1985–86 1986–87
3	Chris Bowles	2,169	1990–91 1991–92 1992–93 1993–94
4	Stan Gouard	1,619	1993–94 1994–95 1995–96
5	Cris Brunson	1,562	2001–02 2002–03 2003–04 2004–05
6	Billy Harris	1,381	1999–00 2000–01 2001–02 2002–03 2003–04
7	Ilo Mutombo	1,352	1987–88 1988–89 1989–90 1990–91
8	Emmanuel Little	1,313	2017–18 2018–19 2019–20 2020–21
9	Ernie Brothers	1,268	1973–74 1974–75 1975–76
10	Diond're Givens	1,262	1999–00 2000–01 2001–02 2002–03

Season
Rk	Player	Points	Season
1	Alex Stein	732	2018–19

Single game
Rk	Player	Points	Season	Opponent
1	Jeril Taylor	50	2016–17	Truman State

== Rebounds ==
Career
Rk	Player	Rebounds	Seasons
1	Chris Bowles	1,129	1990–91 1991–92 1992–93 1993–94
2	Ilo Mutombo	917	1987–88 1988–89 1989–90 1990–91
3	Emmanuel Little	797	2017–18 2018–19 2019–20 2020–21
4	Cully Nelson	790	1979–80 1980–81 1981–82 1982–83
5	Billy Harris	782	1999–00 2000–01 2001–02 2002–03 2003–04
6	Stan Gouard	702	1993–94 1994–95 1995–96
7	DeJuan Rowser	691	1974–75 1975–76 1976–77
	Jacob Polakovich	691	2021–22 2022–23
9	Chris Thompson	625	2004–05 2005–06
10	Julian Hall III	565	1985–86 1986–87
	Diond're Givens	565	1999–00 2000–01 2001–02 2002–03

Season
Rk	Player	Rebounds	Season
1	Jacob Polakovich	398	2022–23
2	Aaron Nelson	368	2013–14

Single game
Rk	Player	Rebounds	Season	Opponent
1	Aaron Nelson	27	2013–14	Kentucky State

== Assists ==
Career
Rk	Player	Assists	Seasons
1	Marc Hostetter	498	1993–94 1994–95 1995–96 1996–97
2	Tyrone Tate	431	1992–93 1993–94
3	Kent Payne	425	1982–83 1983–84
4	Jeff Embrey	403	1984–85 1985–86
5	Alex Stein	386	2015–16 2016–17 2017–18 2018–19
6	Lawrence Thomas	368	2009–10 2011–12 2012–13 2013–14
7	Mateo Rivera	363	2017–18 2018–19 2019–20 2020–21 2021–22
8	Kevin Gant	347	2008–09 2009–10 2010–11
9	P.K. Falkenstein	306	1986–87 1987–88 1988–89
10	Cris Brunson	304	2001–02 2002–03 2003–04 2004–05

Season
Rk	Player	Assists	Season
1	Tyrone Tate	270	1993–94

Single game
Rk	Player	Assists	Season	Opponent
1	Tyrone Tate	17	1993–94	IPFW

== Steals ==
Career
Rk	Player	Steals	Seasons
1	Stan Gouard	175	1993–94 1994–95 1995–96
2	Stephen Jackson	168	1983–84 1984–85 1985–86 1986–87
3	Marc Hostetter	153	1993–94 1994–95 1995–96 1996–97
4	Cris Brunson	132	2001–02 2002–03 2003–04 2004–05
5	Robin Clark	130	1985–86 1986–87 1987–88 1988–89 1989–90
6	Mateo Rivera	128	2017–18 2018–19 2019–20 2020–21 2021–22

Season
Rk	Player	Steals	Season
1	Stan Gouard	66	1994–95

Single game
Rk	Player	Steals	Season	Opponent
1	Alan Goff	8	2002–03	SIU Edwardsville
	Stan Gouard	8	1993–94	Bellarmine
	Stan Gouard	8	1995–96	Indianapolis
	Scott Boyden	8	1994–95	Lewis

== Blocks ==
Career
Rk	Player	Blocks	Seasons
1	John Hollinden	363	1979–80 1980–81
2	Kimon Green	170	1998–99 1999–00 2000–01
3	Chris Bowles	149	1990–91 1991–92 1992–93 1993–94
4	Tyrone Bradshaw	137	2008–09 2009–10
5	Ilo Mutombo	128	1987–88 1988–89 1989–90 1990–91

Season
Rk	Player	Blocks	Season
1	John Hollinden	199	1980–81

Single game
Rk	Player	Blocks	Season	Opponent
1	John Hollinden	17	1980–81	Kentucky Wesleyan
