= 2023 Ohio Valley Conference men's soccer tournament =

Soccer tournament

- Classification: Division I
- Teams: 6
- Matches: 5
- Attendance: 2,653
- Site: Korte Stadium; Edwardsville, Illinois
- Champions: SIU Edwardsville (1 title)
- Winning coach: Cale Wassermann (SIUE) (1 title)
- MVP: Ignacio "Nacho" Abeal Pou (SIUE)
- Broadcast: ESPN+

2023 Ohio Valley Conference men's soccer standings
	Conf.					Overall
Team	W		L		T	W		L		T
SIU Edwardsville ‡	9	–	0	–	1	16	–	1	–	3
Incarnate Word	4	–	3	–	3	7	–	8	–	5
Liberty	4	–	4	–	2	9	–	6	–	3
Lindenwood ^{#}	3	–	3	–	4	7	–	7	–	6
Chicago State	3	–	4	–	3	5	–	10	–	4
Eastern Illinois	3	–	5	–	2	4	–	10	–	5
Houston Christian	2	–	4	–	4	4	–	8	–	6
Southern Indiana ^{#}	1	–	6	–	3	2	–	12	–	3
‡ – 2023 Ohio Valley tournament champion + – At-large invitation to the 2023 NCAA tournament ^{#} – Ineligible for NCAA tournament (In transition); As of December 12, 2023; Rankings from United Soccer Coaches; Source: OVC

The 2023 Ohio Valley Conference men's soccer tournament was the inaugural edition of the Ohio Valley Conference men's soccer tournament. The tournament decided the Ohio Valley Conference (OVC) champion and automatic qualifier (AQ) into the 2023 NCAA Division I men's soccer tournament. All games were played at Ralph Korte Stadium in Edwardsville, Illinois.

== Background ==
Before the 2022 season, only two OVC members—Eastern Illinois and SIU Edwardsville (SIUE)—sponsored men's soccer, respectively playing that sport in the Summit League and Missouri Valley Conference (MVC).

In February 2022, two NCAA Division II schools that sponsored men's soccer, Lindenwood and Southern Indiana, announced that they would start transitions to Division I and join the OVC that July. Both schools initially placed men's soccer in the Summit League, joining Eastern Illinois.

The OVC still had only four men's soccer schools, two short of the number required for a conference to receive an automatic bid to the Division I tournament. However, further developments in conference realignment would give the OVC the opportunity to add enough members to start a men's soccer league.

Incarnate Word (UIW), a member of the Southland Conference (SLC), announced in November 2021 that it would join the Western Athletic Conference (WAC) the following July. Since the SLC sponsors soccer only for women, UIW was then housing men's soccer in the WAC. However, only a week before the full-time move to the WAC would have taken effect, UIW announced it would remain in the SLC. The WAC then removed UIW from its men's soccer league, although it never made an official announcement, and UIW played the 2022 season as in independent.

Also in November 2021, Liberty, then a full member of the ASUN Conference (which sponsors men's soccer) and an FBS independent in football, announced that it would join the FBS Conference USA (C-USA) in 2023. However, C-USA would shut down its men's soccer league after the 2021 season, with all of its men's soccer members joining other conferences for 2022. (Note: Specifically: The Sun Belt Conference (SBC) announced it would reinstate its men's soccer league in 2022 after a one-season hiatus. Four of the revived league's inaugural members came from C-USA. Coastal Carolina was a full SBC member that had housed men's soccer in C-USA; Marshall and Old Dominion were previously full C-USA members before becoming full SBC members; and Kentucky had been a C-USA men's soccer associate. Another new SBC associate, West Virginia, had been a Mid-American Conference (MAC) member in men's soccer, but had announced a move to C-USA for that sport before switching to the SBC.; The American Athletic Conference (The American) announced that the remaining four C-USA men's soccer members—Charlotte, FIU, Florida Atlantic, and UAB—would join its men's soccer league starting in 2022. Three of the four schools (all but FIU) were set to become full members of The American in 2023.) This left Liberty without a men's soccer home.

Chicago State, which had been a geographic outlier for most of its tenure as a full WAC member, announced it would leave that conference in 2022. It was unable to find a full-time conference home, becoming an all-sports independent, but found a men's soccer home in the Mid-American Conference (MAC). However, the MAC had lost men's soccer associate SIUE to the MVC in 2021 and would lose West Virginia to the SBC in 2022. After the departure of West Virginia, the MAC had only five men's soccer members, one short of the six needed to maintain its automatic bid. After failing to find the needed sixth member, the MAC shut down its men's soccer league after the 2022 season.

The OVC then announced on March 28, 2023 that it would add men's soccer as a sponsored sport effective with the 2023 season. The new league would include full members Eastern Illinois, Lindenwood, SIUE, and Southern Indiana, plus affiliates Chicago State, Houston Christian, Liberty, and UIW.

== Qualification ==
The top six teams in the Ohio Valley Conferencel earned berths in the OVC Tournament, which was held November 5, 8 & 11 in Edwardsville, Illinois on the campus of Southern Illinois University Edwardsville. The OVC Soccer Conference is divided into two divisions---Members and Affiliates. The first-place finishers in each division are seeds 1 and 2 and received first round byes.

All teams were eligible for the OVC Tournament, including both reclassifying teams. Lindenwood and Southern Indiana, were eligible to compete in and win the OVC Tournament this season. Should one of them win the OVC Tournament Championship, the AQ shall be awarded to the tournament runner-up. If the tournament runner-up is also a transitioning school, the AQ representative shall be the third-place team. If the established tie-breaker criteria cannot determine the third-placed team, the AQ shall be the semifinal team that had the highest seed on entry to the tournament.

== Bracket ==
Quarterfinals; November 5 ESPN+
4	Lindenwood	2
5	Chicago State	0
3	Liberty	0 (1)
6	Eastern Illinois (pen.)	0 (3)

Semifinals; November 8 ESPN+
1	SIU Edwardsville	2
4	Lindenwood	0
2	Incarnate Word	1
6	Eastern Illinois	0

Final; November 11; ESPN+
1	SIU Edwardsville	1
2	Incarnate Word	0

== Matches ==
=== Quarterfinals ===
November 5, 2023	Eastern Illinois	0–0 (a.e.t.) (3–1 p)	Liberty	Edwardsville, Illinois
1:00 PM				Stadium: Korte Stadium; Attendance: 269; Referee: Christopher Koloffon; Assistant referees: Bensnik Rexhepi; Adam Herges; Fourth official: Matthew Geringer

November 5, 2023	Chicago State	0–2	Lindenwood	Edwardsville, Illinois
4:00 PM			Boasso; Blake	Stadium: Korte Stadium; Attendance: 198; Referee: Calin Radosav; Assistant referees: Justin Tomicich; Christopher Lauer; Fourth official: George Major

=== Semifinals ===
November 8, 2023	Eastern Illinois	0–1	Incarnate Word	Edwardsville, Illinois
3:00 PM			Diphoko 41' (Ansah)	Stadium: Korte Stadium; Attendance: 125; Referee: Art Arustamyn; Assistant referees: Khalaf Malkawi; Braeden Frey; Fourth official: Shane Butler

November 8, 2023	Lindenwood	0–2	#24 SIU Edwardsville	Edwardsville, Illinois
6:00 PM			Abeal Pou 70' (Layton); Abeal Pou 88' (Delascio)	Stadium: Korte Stadium; Attendance: 724; Referee: Andrew Ellsworth; Assistant referees: Matthew Rodman; Johann Arnason; Fourth official: Shane Butler

=== Final ===
November 11, 2023	Incarnate Word	0–1	#24 SIU Edwardsville	Edwardsville, Illinois
6:00 PM			Abeal Pou	Stadium: Korte Stadium; Attendance: 1337; Referee: Dimitrios Katsimingos; Assistant referees: Kurt Wuebbels; Ryan Cornell; Fourth official: Shane Butler

== Statistics ==
=== Goalscorers ===
There were 6 goals scored in 5 matches, for an average of 1.2 goals per match. Players highlighted in bold are still active in the competition.

3 goals

- (Spain) Ignacio Abeal Pou – SIUE

1 goal

- (United States) Matteo Boasso – Lindenwood
- (United States) Ethan Blake – Lindenwood
- (South Africa) Sello Diphoko – Incarnate Word

== All-Tournament team ==
Player	Team
**2023 OVC Men's Soccer All-Tournament team**
Felipe Kerr Lourenco	Eastern Illinois
Maxwell Allen	Eastern Illinois
Cameron Caldwell	Lindenwood
Matteo Boasso	Lindenwood
Luis Zuniga	UIW
Dylan Navarijo	UIW
Will Ansah	UIW
Sam Gomez	SIUE
Sam Layton	SIUE
Aaron Crabtree	SIUE
**Ignacio "Nacho" Abeal Pou**	SIUE

MVP in Bold
