= 2026–27 Southern Indiana Screaming Eagles men's basketball team =

American college basketball season

2026–27 Southern Indiana Screaming Eagles men's basketball
- Conference: Ohio Valley Conference
- Record: 2–5 ( OVC)
- Head coach: Stan Gouard (7th season)
- Assistant coaches: John Spruance; Jon Aldridge; Kevin Missouri
- Home arena: Liberty Arena

2026–27 Ohio Valley Conference men's basketball standings
	Conf.				Overall
Team	W		L	PCT	W		L	PCT
UT Martin	0	–	0	–	4	–	2	.667
Southeast Missouri State	0	–	0	–	3	–	3	.500
Morehead State	0	–	0	–	3	–	4	.429
SIU Edwardsville	0	–	0	–	3	–	4	.429
Tennessee State	0	–	0	–	2	–	3	.400
Lindenwood	0	–	0	–	2	–	4	.333
Southern Indiana	0	–	0	–	2	–	4	.333
Eastern Illinois	0	–	0	–	1	–	6	.143
Western Illinois	0	–	0	–	1	–	6	.143
† 2027 OVC tournament winner As of November 22, 2026; Rankings from AP poll

The 2026–27 Southern Indiana Screaming Eagles men's basketball team will represent the University of Southern Indiana during the 2026–27 NCAA Division I men's basketball season. The Screaming Eagles, led by seventh-year head coach Stan Gouard, will play their home games at the Liberty Arena in Evansville, Indiana, as members of the Ohio Valley Conference.

== Previous season ==
USI concluded the season with a 7–23 record (4–16 in the OVC).

== Offseason ==
=== Departures ===
Southern Indiana departures
Name	Number	Pos.	Height	Weight	Year	Hometown	Reason for departure
Trey Thomas	1	G	6'2"	190	Senior	Grand Rapids, MI	Transferred to Alcorn State
Steven Clay	2	G/F	6'4"	190	Senior	Milwaukee, WI	Graduated
Tolu Samuels	3	F	6'8"	205	Junior	Chicago, IL	Transferred to NIU
Braxton Jones	4	G	6'0"	175	Senior	Monroe, NJ	Transfer portal
Ola Ajiboye	5	F	6'8"	205	Senior	Chicago, IL	Transfer portal
Ben Ezeagu	6	F	6'7"	215	Senior	Brampton, Ontario	Transfer portal
Cardell Bailey	8	G	6'6"	195	Senior	Detroit, MI	Transfer portal
Sheridan Sharp	11	G	6'3"	175	Junior	Indianapolis, IN	Transferred to Nicholls
Devin Curtis	13	F	6'11"	220	Junior	Milwaukee, WI	Transferred to Cal State San Bernardino
Amaree Brown	15	G	6'5"	210	Junior	Chicago, IL	Transferred to Alabama State
Ismail Habib	21	G	6'1"	180	Senior	Chicago, IL	Transferred to Incarnate Word

=== Incoming transfers ===
On April 17, 2026, a trio of players committed to play for USI in the 2026–27 season. LA Hayes is a 6'5" guard who averaged 4.1 points per game at UTEP, having previously spent time at Frank Phillips College in the 2024–25 season, where he averaged 17.2 points, 5 rebounds, and 2.6 assists per game, and at Kent State, where he averaged 4.7 ppg across 13 games played. Donovan Hunter is a 6'8" forward who averaged 4 ppg in his single season at Bellarmine. Prior to his time at Bellarmine, Hunter spent two seasons at Kent State. Johann Pautsch is a 6'10" forward who, in his second season at Three Rivers College, averaged 7.7 points and 6 rebounds per game.

On April 26, 2026, 6'2" guard Ari Gooch committed to play for USI after spending one season at UAB, where he averaged 2.2 ppg. Prior to UAB, Gooch spent one season at McLennan Community College, where he averaged 14.2 ppg.

On May 12, 2026, two players committed to the Screaming Eagles. Transfer forward Ebrahim Kaba, in his lone season at Purdue Fort Wayne, Kaba averaged 4 points, 2.9 rebounds, and 12.8 minutes per game across 20 games played. Prior, Kaba spent one season at St. Bonaventure where he utilized his redshirt year. Transfer guard Afan Trnka, in his second season at UT Martin, averaged 6.5 points, 2.8 rebounds, and 2.4 assists per game.

On May 22, 2026, 6'2" guard Josh Smith committed to play for USI after spending two seasons at Lee College, where he averaged 14.1 points and 4.9 rebounds per game.

On May 29, 2026, 6'9" forward Didier Maleng committed to the Screaming Eagles. The Congo native averaged 1.7 points and 1.6 rebounds per game at Denver. He previously had spent time at South Plains College, Triton College, and Richard J. Daley College.

On June 1, 2026, 6'5" guard Malachi Knight committed to play for USI after spending one season at West LA where he averaged 17.3 points, 4.7 rebounds, and 2.4 assists per game.

Southern Indiana incoming transfers
Name	Number	Pos.	Height	Weight	Year	Hometown	Previous school	Years remaining	Date eligible
Ari Gooch	TBD	G	6'2"	180	Junior	Minneapolis, MN	UAB	2	October 1, 2026
LA Hayes	TBD	G	6'5"	185	Senior	Cleveland, OH	UTEP	1	October 1, 2026
Donovan Hunter	TBD	F	6'8"	200	Senior	Columbus, OH	Bellarmine	1	October 1, 2026
Ebrahim Kaba	TBD	G	6'9"	200	RS Sophomore	East Orange, NJ	Purdue Fort Wayne	2	October 1, 2026
Malachi Knight	TBD	G/F	6'5"	185	Sophomore	Hawthorne, CA	West LA	3	October 1, 2026
Didier Maleng	TBD	F	6'9"	225	Senior	Kinshasa, Congo	Denver	1	October 1, 2026
Johann Pautch	TBD	F	6'10"		Sophomore	Dusseldorf, Germany	Three Rivers	3	October 1, 2026
Josh Smith	TBD	G	6'2"		Junior	Baton Rouge, LA	Lee	2	October 1, 2026
Fredy-Salam Sylla	TBD	G/F	6'7"	210	Junior	Paris, France	Arkansas State	2	October 1, 2026
Afan Trnka	TBD	G	6'2"	180	Senior	Sarajevo, Bosnia and Herzegovina	UT Martin	1	October 1, 2026
Yesan Warren	TBD	G	6'1"	185	Junior	Capitol Heights, MD	Cal State Fullerton	2	October 1, 2026

=== Recruiting classes ===
==== 2026 recruiting class ====
College recruiting
Name	Hometown	School	Height	Weight	Commit date
			N/A	N/A	
Recruit ratings: No ratings found

==== 2027 recruiting class ====
College recruiting
Name	Hometown	School	Height	Weight	Commit date
			N/A	N/A	
Recruit ratings: No ratings found

== Roster ==
2026–27 Southern Indiana Screaming Eagles men's basketball team
Players
Coaches

Pos.	#	Name	Height	Weight	Year	Previous school	Hometown
G	0	Kaden Brown	6 ft 1 in (1.85 m)	175 lb (79 kg)	Sr	Grand Valley State	Grand Rapids, MI
G	1	Josh Smith	6 ft 2 in (1.88 m)	170 lb (77 kg)	Jr	Madison Preparatory Academy/Lee College	Baton Rouge, LA
G	2	Ari Gooch	6 ft 2 in (1.88 m)	180 lb (82 kg)	Jr	Park Center HS/UAB	Minneapolis, MN
G	3	Yesan Warren	6 ft 1 in (1.85 m)	185 lb (84 kg)	Jr	Knoxville Catholic HS/Cal State Fullerton	Capitol Heights, MD
G	4	Afan Trnka	6 ft 2 in (1.88 m)	180 lb (82 kg)	Sr	Bishop Mora Salesian HS/UT Martin	Sarajevo, Bosnia and Herzegovina
F	5	Donovan Hunter	6 ft 8 in (2.03 m)	200 lb (91 kg)	Sr	Spire Academy/Bellarmine	Columbus, OH
F	6	Maksym Hryschuk	6 ft 7 in (2.01 m)	190 lb (86 kg)	Fr	Unlisted	Kyiv, Ukraine
G	7	LA Hayes	6 ft 5 in (1.96 m)	185 lb (84 kg)	Sr	St. Vincent–St. Mary HS/UTEP	Cleveland, OH
F	10	Yuto Yamanouchi-Williams	6 ft 10 in (2.08 m)	230 lb (104 kg)	RS Sr	Ribet Academy/Oral Roberts	Aizuwakamatsu, Japan
F	15	Didier Maleng	6 ft 9 in (2.06 m)	225 lb (102 kg)	Sr	Lawton Christian HS (Oklahoma)	Kinshasa, Congo
G/F	21	Fredy-Salam Sylla	6 ft 7 in (2.01 m)	210 lb (95 kg)	Jr	Potter's House Christian HS/Arkansas State	Paris, France
G	22	Josiah Dunham	6 ft 0 in (1.83 m)	180 lb (82 kg)	Jr	Evansville Christian School	Evansville, IN
G/F	24	Malachi Knight	6 ft 5 in (1.96 m)	185 lb (84 kg)	So	Leuzinger HS/West LA	Hawthorne, CA
F	31	Johann Pautsch	6 ft 10 in (2.08 m)	245 lb (111 kg)	So	Three Rivers	Dusseldorf, Germany
G	33	Alem Fejzic	6 ft 3 in (1.91 m)	190 lb (86 kg)	Jr	Potter's House Christian/Frank Phillips	Sarajevo, Bosnia and Herzegovina

Head coach

- Stan Gouard (Southern Indiana)

Assistant coach(es)

- John Spruance (Hope)
- Jon Aldridge (Indianapolis)
- Kevin Missouri (Texas Southern)

Legend

- (C) Team captain
- (S) Suspended
- (I) Ineligible
- (W) Walk-on
- Injured
- Current redshirt

Roster
Last update: October 27, 2026

== Schedule and results ==
Date time, TV	Rank^{#}	Opponent^{#}	Result	Record	Site (attendance) city, state
Non-conference regular season
OVC regular season
*Non-conference game. ^{#}Rankings from AP Poll. (#) Tournament seedings in parentheses. All times are in Central.
