= Ronald Rochon =

American academic administrator

Ronald S. Rochon
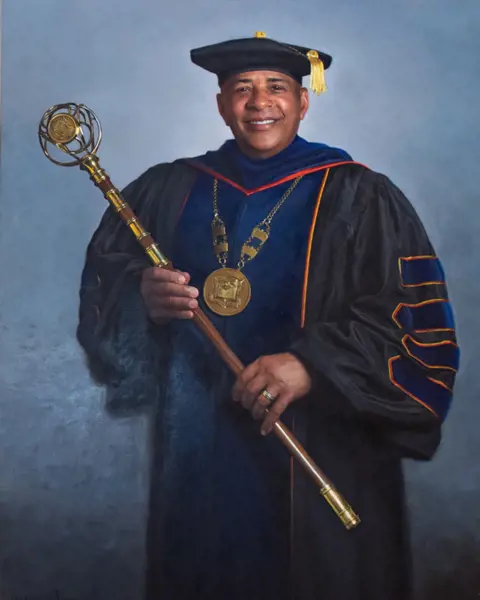
- Official portrait of Rochon as President of the University of Southern Indiana (2018-2024)

10th President of California State University, Fullerton
- Incumbent
- Assumed office July 22, 2024
- Preceded by: Sylvia Alva (interim); Framroze Virjee

4th President of the University of Southern Indiana
- In office July 1, 2018 – July 19, 2024
- Preceded by: Linda L. M. Bennett
- Succeeded by: Steven J. Bridges (interim)

Personal details
- Born: Chicago, Illinois, U.S.
- Education: Tuskegee Institute (BS); University of Illinois (MS, PhD)
- Website: president.fullerton.edu

Ronald Stephen Rochon is an American educator and academic administrator. He became president of California State University, Fullerton on July 22, 2024. He had served as the 4th president of the University of Southern Indiana from 2018 until 2024.

== Early life and education ==
Ronald Stephen Rochon was born and raised on the south side of Chicago, Illinois. He graduated from Willibrord Catholic High School.

Rochon attended Tuskegee Institute and graduated with a bachelor's degree in animal science in 1983. He earned a master's degree in animal sciences from the University of Illinois Urbana-Champaign in 1986. In 1997, Rochon received a PhD in educational policy studies from the University of Illinois.

== Career ==
Rochon worked as a professor at Texas A&M University, Washington State University, and the University of Wisconsin–La Crosse. He served as the inaugural dean of the School of Education at Buffalo State University.

In 2010, Rochon began his tenure as provost at the University of Southern Indiana in Evansville, Indiana. He became the fourth president of USI on July 1, 2018. He is the first African American president of the university and was inaugurated on April 5, 2019. He guided the university through the COVID-19 pandemic and presided over USI athletics' move from NCAA Division II to Division I.

Rochon has served as chair of the American Association of State Colleges and Universities' board of directors since 2023.

In May 2024, Rochon announced that he would be stepping down from his position as president of the University of Southern Indiana after accepting a new position as president of California State University, Fullerton. The following week, USI announced that Steven J. Bridges would replace Rochon as interim president effective July 20, 2024.

== Personal life ==
Rochon has two adult children with his wife Lynn. Rochon is a member of the Omega Psi Phi fraternity.
