= Linda L. M. Bennett =

American political scientist

Linda Louise M. Bennett

3rd President of the University of Southern Indiana
- In office July 1, 2009 – June 30, 2018
- Preceded by: H. Ray Hoops
- Succeeded by: Ronald Rochon

Academic background
- Education: University of Cincinnati (BA, MA, PhD)
- Thesis: Symbolic state politics: Education funding in Ohio, 1970-1980 (1981)
- Doctoral advisor: Norman C. Thomas

Academic work
- Discipline: Political science
- Institutions: University of Cincinnati; Wittenberg University; Northern Kentucky University; Appalachian State University; University of Southern Indiana

Linda Louise M. Bennett (born December 25, 1952, in Cincinnati) is an American academic who was named president of the University of Southern Indiana (USI) by its Board of Trustees effective July 1, 2009, to replace incumbent president H. Ray Hoops who had retired on June 30, 2009.

In August 2017, Bennett announced she would retire as president USI on June 30, 2018.

== Education ==
Linda Bennett received her baccalaureate and master's degrees and her Ph.D. in political science all from the University of Cincinnati. The Bennetts resided in Evansville, Indiana.

== Career ==
Bennett previously served at Wittenberg University, Northern Kentucky University, and Appalachian State University and as USI's provost and vice president for academic affairs. A professor of political science, Bennett has a publication record which includes joint-authorship, with her husband Stephen Earl Bennett, of Living with Leviathan: Americans Coming to Terms with Big Government (2007). According to Michael Margolis,

No other book has ordered and analyzed a comparable set of data regarding attitudes toward the power of the federal government.

At the time of her selection to be president of USI, Bennett was one of five remaining applicants under consideration for the presidency of Southeastern Louisiana University.
