= Rodney Watson =

American basketball coach (born 1960)

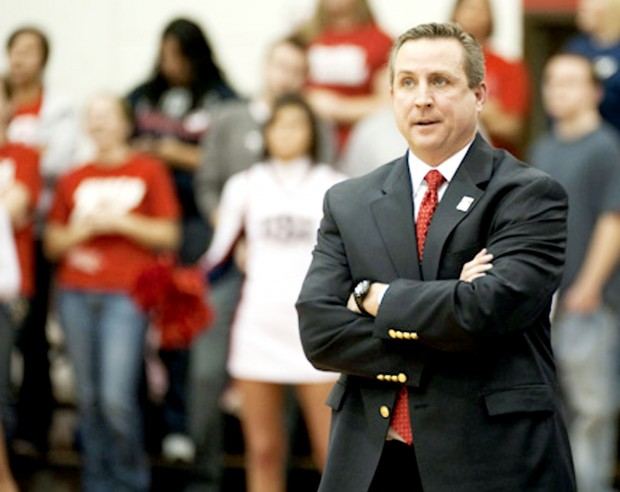
- Watson during the 2009-10 USI season

Biographical details
- Born: July 18, 1960 (age 66); Paris, Illinois, U.S.
- Education: Eastern Illinois

Coaching career (HC unless noted)
- 1986–1988: Nebraska–Omaha (assistant)
- 1988–2009: Southern Illinois (assistant)
- 2009–2020: Southern Indiana

Head coaching record
- Overall: 251-82

Accomplishments and honors

Championships
- 2 GLVC tournament (2012, 2014); 1 NCAA Division II Midwest Regional (2019)

Awards
- GLVC Coach of the Year (2010)

Rodney Watson (born July 18, 1960) is an American basketball coach and the former head coach for the University of Southern Indiana. Watson succeeded Rick Herdes, who resigned following a scandal that ultimately resulted in suspension from postseason play for one year.

== Early life ==
Watson was born in Paris, Illinois and graduated from Eastern Illinois University in 1982. Rodney and his wife Carol live in Carterville, Illinois, where their kids attend school. Blake (16), Olivia (16), Zach (20), and Ashley (21). Ashley was a member of the Saluki Shaker dance team at Southern Illinois. Zach is currently a member of the USI track team in which he competes in the high jump.

== Coaching career ==
Watson's coaching career began in 1982 at Coulterville High School in Coulterville, Illinois, where he led the team to an Illinois high school regional championship. In 1984, he became the head coach at Madison High School in Madison, Illinois, where he coached the Trojans to an appearance in the Illinois high school Elite Eight.

=== Collegiate assistant ===
In 1986, Watson began a two-year stay as an assistant the University of Nebraska-Omaha men's basketball team, before becoming an assistant coach at Southern Illinois University men's team in 1988 and remained until after the 2008–2009 season. During his twenty-one seasons with the Salukis, he helped coach the team to a 430–238 record, eleven Missouri Valley Conference championships, and nine NCAA Division I men's basketball tournament appearances (the Salukis had only had one previously)--including six in his last seven years. While at SIU, Watson worked under head coaches Rich Herrin, Bruce Weber, Matt Painter, and Chris Lowery. Neil Hayes, writing for The Chicago Sun-Times credited Watson with maintaining continuity for the team across the tenures of four different head coaches.

He was considered for a position as men's basketball coach at Southern Illinois University Edwardsville in 2007.

=== Southern Indiana ===
On May 22, 2009, Watson was hired to fill a vacancy created by the departure of Rick Herdes, who resigned following a scandal involving multiple NCAA rules violations by USI. Despite a one-year prohibition on postseason play imposed by the GLVC, Watson led the team to a 23–0 start and a #2 ranking in the NABC Division II Top 25 Poll making it the best start for a first-year coach at USI. During the 2013–2014, Watson led USI to a GLVC Tournament Championship. USI also completed a season sweep of Bellarmine for the first time since the 2004–05 season.

Watson retired following the 2019–20 season. His teams compiled a record of 251–82 over his eleven seasons.

=== Post-coaching ===
On November 4, 2020, Watson was named as a radio analyst on Saluki men's basketball broadcasts, splitting those duties with Greg Starrick. He moved into the primary analyst's role for the 2021–22 season.

== Head coaching record ==
Record table
Season	Coach	Overall	Conference	Standing	Postseason
Southern Indiana (Great Lakes Valley Conference) (2009–2020)
2009–10	Southern Indiana	24–3	15–3	2nd (East)	None
2010–11	Southern Indiana	24–6	14–4	2nd (East)	NCAA D–II First Round
2011–12	Southern Indiana	24–7	12–6	T–3rd (East)	NCAA D–II First Round
2012–13	Southern Indiana	23–8	13–5	2nd (East)	NCAA D–II Second Round
2013-14	Southern Indiana	25-6	13-5	T-2nd (East)	NCAA D–II First Round
2014-15	Southern Indiana	19-8	12-6	T-4th (East)	None
2015-16	Southern Indiana	19-11	10-8	5th (East)	None
2016-17	Southern Indiana	25-5	15-3	2nd (East)	NCAA D-II Regional
2017-18	Southern Indiana	20-11	11-7	3rd (East)	None
2018-19	Southern Indiana	26-9	13-5	3rd	NCAA D-II Final Four
2019-20	Southern Indiana	22-8	13-7	4th	Cancelled due to COVID-19
Southern Indiana:		251-82 (0.754)	141-59 (0.705)		
Total:		251-82 (0.754)			
National champion Postseason invitational champion Conference regular season champion Conference regular season and conference tournament champion Division regular season champion Division regular season and conference tournament champion Conference tournament champion
