= Southern Indiana Screaming Eagles men's basketball =

2026–27 Southern Indiana Screaming Eagles men's basketball team
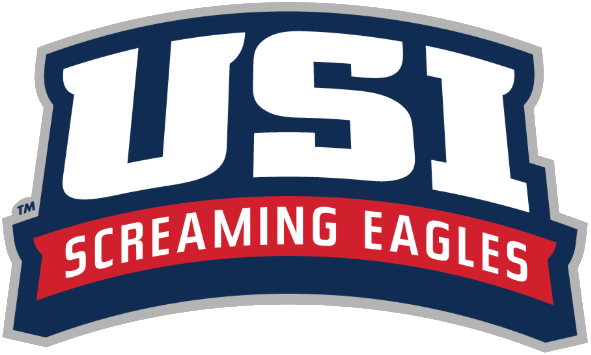
- University: University of Southern Indiana
- Head coach: Stan Gouard (7th season)
- Location: Evansville, Indiana
- Arena: Liberty Arena (capacity: 4,800)
- Conference: Ohio Valley Conference
- Nickname: Screaming Eagles
- Colors: Blue, white, and red

NCAA Division I tournament champions
- Division II: 1995
Other NCAA Division I tournament results
Runner-up	Division II: 1994, 2004
Final Four	Division II: 1994, 1995, 2004, 2019
Elite Eight	Division II: 1994, 1995, 2004, 2019
Appearances	Division II: 1978, 1980, 1981, 1985, 1987, 1990, 1993, 1994, 1995, 1996, 1997, 1998, 1999, 2000, 2001, 2003, 2004, 2005, 2006, 2007, 2009, 2011, 2012, 2013, 2014, 2017, 2019, 2020, 2021

Conference tournament champions
- GLVC: 2005, 2007, 2012, 2014

The Southern Indiana Screaming Eagles men's basketball team, also previously known as the Indiana State University-Evansville Screaming Eagles, represents the University of Southern Indiana in Evansville, Indiana, United States. The Screaming Eagles currently compete in the Division I Ohio Valley Conference.

The team is currently led by sixth-year head coach Stan Gouard and play their home games at Liberty Arena. He will continue to coach the 2026-2027 team next season.

== Postseason results ==
=== NCAA Division II Tournament results ===
The Screaming Eagles appeared in the NCAA Division II tournament twenty-nine times. Their combined record was 37–30.

Year	Round	Opponent	Result
1978	Regional semifinals Regional final	Northern Kentucky; Eastern Illinois	W 86–78; L 67–79
1980	Regional semifinals Regional Third Place	Northern Michigan; Wright State	L 82–93; L 85–88
1981	Regional semifinals Regional Third Place	Western Illinois; Wright State	L 73–80; L 89–96
1985	Regional semifinals Regional Third Place	Kentucky Wesleyan; Lewis	L 64–77; W 92–78
1987	Regional semifinals Regional Third Place	SIU Edwardsville; Johnson C. Smith	L 82–88; W 102–96
1990	Regional semifinals Regional Third Place	SE Missouri State; West Texas State	L 73–91; L 92–98^{OT}
1993	Regional semifinals Regional Third Place	Northern Michigan; IPFW	L 85–86; W 95–93
1994	Regional semifinals Regional finals Elite Eight; Final Four; National Championship	Kentucky Wesleyan; Wayne State; South Dakota; New Hampshire College; Cal State Bakersfield	W 78–67; W 84–112; W 98–77; W 111–89; L 86–92
1995	Regional First round Regional semifinals Regional finals Elite Eight; Final Four; National Championship	Hillsdale; Kentucky Wesleyan; Northern Kentucky; New Hampshire College; Norfolk State; UC Riverside	W 95–88; W 102–81; W 102–94; W 108–93; W 89–81; W 71–63
1996	Regional semifinals Regional finals	Indianapolis; Northern Kentucky	W 75–71; L 87–99
1997	Regional First round	Quincy	L 118–125^{2OT}
1998	Regional semifinals Regional finals	Northern Kentucky; Kentucky Wesleyan	W 81–66; L 79–98
1999	Regional First round Regional semifinals Regional finals	Northwood; Wayne State; Kentucky Wesleyan	W 89–79; W 72–69; L 64–76
2000	Regional semifinals Regional finals	Michigan Tech; Kentucky Wesleyan	W 85–68; L 79–88
2001	Regional semifinals	Northern Kentucky	L 92–93
2003	Regional First round Regional semifinals Regional finals	Lewis; Michigan Tech; Kentucky Wesleyan	W 82–63; W 74–71; L 91–95
2004	Regional First round Regional semifinals Regional finals Elite Eight; Final Four; National Championship	Kentucky Wesleyan; Findlay; Wayne State; NW Missouri State; Humboldt State; Kennesaw State	W 96–83; W 75–67; W 69–68; W 88–81; W 83–81; L 59–84
2005	Regional First round Regional semifinals	Gannon; Ferris State	W 67–61; L 87–93
2006	Regional First round Regional semifinals Regional finals	Drury; Saint Joseph's (IN); SIU Edwardsville	W 78–58; W 81–78; L 60–64^{OT}
2007	Regional First round Regional semifinals	Rockhurst; Grand Valley State	W 84–78; L 83–92
2009	Regional First round Regional semifinals	Rockhurst; Findlay	W 78–72; L 59–81
2011	Regional First round	Drury	L 64–65
2012	Regional First round	Kentucky Wesleyan	L 58–64
2013	Regional First round Regional semifinals	Wayne State; Bellarmine	W 79–70; L 55–78
2014	Regional First round	Michigan Tech	L 70–75
2017	Regional First round	Findlay	L 69–70
2019	Regional First round Regional semifinals Regional finals Elite Eight; Final Four	Ashland; Lewis; Bellarmine; West Texas A&M; Point Loma Nazarene	W 66–60; W 62–61; W 76–69; W 94–84; L 71–81
2020	Regional First round	UMSL	Cancelled
2021	Regional First round Regional semifinals	Lewis; Michigan Tech	W 62–60; L 69–81

=== CBI Tournament results ===
The Screaming Eagles appeared in the CBI tournament one time. Their combined record is 0–1.

Year	Round	Opponent	Result
2023	First Round	San Jose State	L 52–77

== See also ==
- Southern Indiana Screaming Eagles men's basketball statistical leaders
- Southern Indiana Screaming Eagles
- Southern Indiana Screaming Eagles women's basketball
