= Robert Titzer =

American professor and infant researcher (born 1960)

Robert C. Titzer
- Born: June 1960 (age 66)
- Education: San Diego State University; University of Southern Indiana; Pennsylvania State University; Indiana University Bloomington
- Occupation: Academic

Robert C. Titzer (born June 1960) is an American professor and infant researcher who claimed to create an approach to teach babies written language, which resulted in the Your Baby Can products.

He has been a professor, teacher, and public speaker on human learning for around 31 years, and says that he taught his own children to read using the multi-sensory approach that he developed. He is the founder of the Infant Learning Company, a company that produces learning products for infants. Your Baby Can Read, sold in 2008 via television infomercials, is an example of one of his popular learning products.

== Education and degrees ==
Titzer received his teaching credentials from San Diego State University. In the late 1980s, he taught at public schools in Guam and California. In 1985, he earned a communications degree from the University of Southern Indiana. He later completed a Master of Science degree from Pennsylvania State University and received a doctorate in human performance from the Indiana University Bloomington. At Bloomington, he did experiments in infant learning at developmental psychology laboratories. During his tenure as professor at Southeastern Louisiana University, Titzer developed a program to teach toddlers to read. He has also been a professor at Pennsylvania State University, Indiana University, and California State University, Fullerton.

=== Publications ===
A search of the PsycINFO database reveals three publications which include Titzer as an author. He was one of four co-authors of a paper which was published in 1999 in Psychological Review, titled "The Task Dynamics of the A-Not-B Error". The other two citations in PsycINFO include his dissertation, which concerned the infant's understanding of the visual cliff, and a paper he co-authored in 1993, "The influence of reminder trials on contextual interference effects."

== Occupation ==
Initially Dr. Titzer created this program for his own daughters which he says made them independent readers at a very early age. In 1997, Titzer began selling "Your Baby Can Read!/Learn!" videos. Titzer also trains preschool teachers in many countries and he consults with learning centers and preschools in India, Hong Kong, Vietnam, Indonesia, the United States, and China. YBC is represented by LearningMojo Pvt Ltd in India and operates multiple early learning centers in Karnataka, Tamil Nadu, Telangana, Haryana, Delhi NCR and Gujarat. Along with providing YBC products, these centres help parents with YBC classes, parent toddler classes to help their children with early language development.

== Criticism ==
Some people have criticized Titzer's videos as being suspect because they lack rigorous scientific review and are commercial products.

In November 2010, Jeff Rossen and Robert Powell of NBC's Today wrote that Titzer "calls himself an infant learning expert but actually holds a graduate degree in 'human performance' — the study of motor skills."

Maryanne Wolf, Tufts University's director of cognitive neuroscience, said: "It's an extraordinary manipulation of facts" to claim that the babies are actually reading. Today interviewed ten experts who affirmed that the brains of babies and toddlers are not developed enough to read at "the level the way the enticing television ads claim they can". Titzer argued against these claims, saying that scientific research supported the effectiveness of Your Baby Can Learn.

On August 22, 2014, a press release from the Federal Trade Commission related the following: "Your Baby Can Read creator, Dr. Robert Titzer, and his company, Infant Learning, Inc. d/b/a The Infant Learning Company have settled charges that they made baseless claims about the effectiveness of the Your Baby Can Read program and misrepresented that scientific studies proved the claims.". Titzer now has broken his ties with the marketing company which used infomercials to sell the products in huge numbers. He now often works with people in the field of early childhood education to market the products.

== Personal ==
Titzer and his family live just outside San Diego, California.
