= Monroe Township, New Jersey =

Monroe Township is the name of some places in the U.S. state of New Jersey:

- Monroe Township, Gloucester County, New Jersey
- Monroe Township, Middlesex County, New Jersey

== See also ==
- Monroe Township (disambiguation)
