= Stan Gouard =

American basketball player and coach (born 1970)

Southern Indiana Screaming Eagles
- Title: Head coach
- League: Ohio Valley Conference

Personal information
- Born: October 14, 1970 (age 56) Danville, Illinois, U.S.
- Listed height: 6 ft 5 in (1.96 m)
- Listed weight: 200 lb (91 kg)

Career information
- High school: Danville (Danville, Illinois)
- College: John A. Logan (1991–1992); Southern Indiana (1993–1996)
- NBA draft: 1996: undrafted
- Position: Small forward / shooting guard
- Coaching career: 2001–present

Career history

Playing
- 1996–1997: Sundsvall Dragons
- 1997–1998: Des Moines Dragons
- 1998: Caimanes de Barranquilla
- 1998: Dorados de Chihuahua
- 1999: Des Moines Dragons

Coaching
- 2001–2002: Southern Indiana (assistant)
- 2002–2005: Indianapolis (assistant)
- 2005–2008: Indiana State (assistant)
- 2008–2020: Indianapolis
- 2020–present: Southern Indiana

Career highlights
- As player: NCAA Division II champion (1995); NCAA Division II Tournament MOP (1994); 2× NABC Division II Player of the Year (1995, 1996); 2× First-team Division II All-American (1995, 1996); 3× First-team All-GLVC (1994–1996); GLVC Newcomer of the Year (1994); As coach: GLVC Coach of the Year (2014)

Stanley Gouard (born October 14, 1970) is an American college basketball coach, currently head coach for the University of Southern Indiana (USI). Gouard also played for USI, where he was twice named NCAA Division II National Player of the Year.

== College career ==
A native of Danville, Illinois, Gouard played for Danville High School, where he graduated in 1988. He tried unsuccessfully to catch on with two separate junior colleges before returning to Danville to work. After a strong showing in an amateur summer festival, he was signed by John A. Logan College and played the 1991–92 season, earning NJCAA All-American honors. While he was pursued by several Division I programs, his age limited his eligibility whereas the looser Division II standards would allow him to compete for three seasons. He opted to sign with coach Bruce Pearl at Southern Indiana and, after sitting out the 1992–93 season due to injury, began his USI career the next year.

Gouard led the Screaming Eagles to consecutive Division II championship games as a sophomore and junior, earning Tournament Most Outstanding Player honors in a close loss to Cal State Bakersfield in 1994. The next season Gouard led the team to its first national title as they defeated UC Riverside 71–63 in the final. Gouard was named NABC Division II Player of the Year in both his junior and senior seasons, as well as a first-team All-American.

== Professional career ==
Following the close of his college career, Gouard played professionally in Sweden (Sundsvall Dragons), Colombia (Caimanes de Barranquilla) and Mexico (Dorados de Chihuahua). He also played in the United States for the Des Moines Dragons of the International Basketball Association. Gouard led the Caimanes to back to back Colombian championship during his time with them.

== Coaching career ==
Gouard entered the coaching ranks in 2001 as he returned to USI as an assistant to head coach Rick Herdes' staff. Following the season, he moved to a similar position with the University of Indianapolis under coach Todd Sturgeon. He then moved to Division I Indiana State under Royce Waltman. He remained on staff for the 2007–08 season under Kevin McKenna after Waltman was fired.

He was named head coach at Indianapolis in 2008 after Waltman, who had served as interim head coach of the Greyhounds the previous year, decided not to pursue the job. Gouard coached the Greyhounds for twelve seasons, compiling a record of 204–111. He qualified for eight NCAA Division II Tournament appearances, reaching the tournament every year from 2010 to 2016 and again in 2020. He was named the Great Lakes Valley Conference (GLVC) Coach of the Year in 2014. During the 2019–20 season, Indianapolis finished 24–6 and earned the No. 1 seed in the NCAA Division II Midwest Regional before the season was cancelled due to the coronavirus pandemic.

On April 7, 2020, Gouard was named head coach of his alma mater, Southern Indiana, replacing the retiring Rodney Watson.

== Head coaching record ==
Record table
Season	Team	Overall	Conference	Standing	Postseason
Indianapolis Greyhounds (Great Lakes Valley Conference) (2008–2020)
2008–09	Indianapolis	9–18	4–14	6th (East)	
2009–10	Indianapolis	12–16	6–12	5th (East)	
2010–11	Indianapolis	19–9	12–6	T3rd (East)	NCAA Division II first round
2011–12	Indianapolis	20–9	12–6	T3rd (East)	NCAA Division II second round
2012–13	Indianapolis	20–9	11–7	T6th (East)	NCAA Division II first round
2013–14	Indianapolis	24–5	15–3	T1st (East)	NCAA Division II second round
2014–15	Indianapolis	25–6	14–4	3rd (East)	NCAA Division II Sweet Sixteen
2015–16	Indianapolis	21–8	14–4	3rd (East)	NCAA Division II second round
2016–17	Indianapolis	16–12	12–6	4th (East)	
2017–18	Indianapolis	19–9	12–6	4th (East)	
2018–19	Indianapolis	19–10	12–6	4th	
2019–20	Indianapolis	24–6	15–5	3rd	NCAA Division II Cancelled
Indianapolis:		228–117 (.661)	139–79 (.638)		
Southern Indiana Screaming Eagles (Great Lakes Valley Conference) (2020–2022)
2020–21	Southern Indiana	12–5	11–4	1st (East)	NCAA Division II second round
2021–22	Southern Indiana	18–8	12–6		
Southern Indiana Screaming Eagles (Ohio Valley Conference) (2022–present)
2022–23	Southern Indiana	16–17	9–9	T–6th	CBI First Round
2023–24	Southern Indiana	8–24	5–13	T–8th	
2024–25	Southern Indiana	10–20	5–15	11th	
2025–26	Southern Indiana	7–23	4–16	10th	
2026–27	Southern Indiana	0–0	0–0		
Southern Indiana:		71–97 (.423)	45–63 (.417)		
Total:		299–214 (.583)			
National champion Postseason invitational champion Conference regular season champion Conference regular season and conference tournament champion Division regular season champion Division regular season and conference tournament champion Conference tournament champion
