= Southern Indiana Screaming Eagles =

Athletic team of the University of Southern Indiana

- University: University of Southern Indiana
- Nickname: Screaming Eagles
- NCAA: Division I
- Conference: Ohio Valley Conference (Main Conference); Summit (Men's soccer, swimming & diving); Horizon (Men's tennis)
- Athletic director: Jon Mark Hall
- Location: Vanderburgh County, Indiana
- Varsity teams: 19 (9 men's and 10 women's)
- Basketball arena: Liberty Arena, Home of the Screaming Eagles
- Baseball stadium: USI Baseball Field
- Soccer stadium: Strassweg Field
- Colors: Blue, white, and red
- Mascot: Archibald T. Eagle
- Fight song: "Fight On, Screaming Eagles!"
- Website: usiscreamingeagles.com
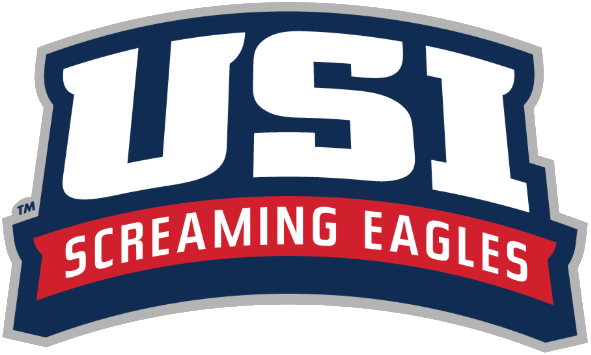

The Southern Indiana Screaming Eagles (colloquially known as Screagles) are the athletic teams that represent the University of Southern Indiana, located outside Evansville in Vanderburgh County, Indiana, United States, in NCAA Division I intercollegiate sports. The Screaming Eagles compete as members of the Ohio Valley Conference. Southern Indiana had previously been a member of the NCAA Division II Great Lakes Valley Conference from 1978 to 2022, when the school announced it would reclassify to NCAA Division I.

USI was a founding member of the GLVC and began competing in 1979, leading to 188 NCAA Tournament appearances and 231 athletes earning All-American honors. USI has ten NCAA II individual national championships in cross country and track & field, and 16 NCAA II regional championships in baseball, men's basketball, women' basketball, men's cross country, women's cross country and softball. In 2018, USI won the NCAA II Softball National Championship, becoming the first softball team in Indiana to win an NCAA championship. In 2010, USI was the first GLVC member and university in the state of Indiana to win a national championship in baseball, repeating in 2014 to become the first NCAA II program to win multiple team titles. Men's basketball won the NCAA II National Championship in 1995 with 3.9 million viewers watching them on CBS Sports.

USI boasts a strong academic record as well, with 228 Academic All-GLVC athletes in 2021–22 and 35 Academic All-America honors. Student athletes maintain an average GPA of 3.29 and are retained at a high percentage.

== History ==
- 1970–1978 – NCAA Division II Independent
- 1978–2022 – Great Lakes Valley Conference
- 2022–present – Ohio Valley Conference
  - Three sports not sponsored by the OVC joined the Summit League—the established sport of men's soccer, as well as men's and women's swimming & diving, added in 2022–23. Less than a week after USI joined the OVC, the OVC and the Horizon League announced that they would merge their men's tennis leagues under the Horizon banner effective immediately. USI accordingly became a Horizon affiliate in that sport. Men's soccer joins the newly formed OVC men's soccer league for 2023 and beyond.

On February 7, 2022, the university's board of trustees unanimously approved the athletics program to seek membership at the NCAA Division I level. On February 9, USI announced that it had accept an offer to become a member of the Ohio Valley Conference beginning on July 1, 2022.

== Sports sponsored ==
Men's sports	Women's sports
Baseball	Basketball
Basketball	Cross country
Cross country	Golf
Golf	Soccer
Soccer	Softball
Swimming and diving	Swimming and diving
Tennis	Tennis
Track and field^{†}	Track and field^{†}
	Volleyball
† – Track and field includes both indoor and outdoor

=== Men's Basketball ===
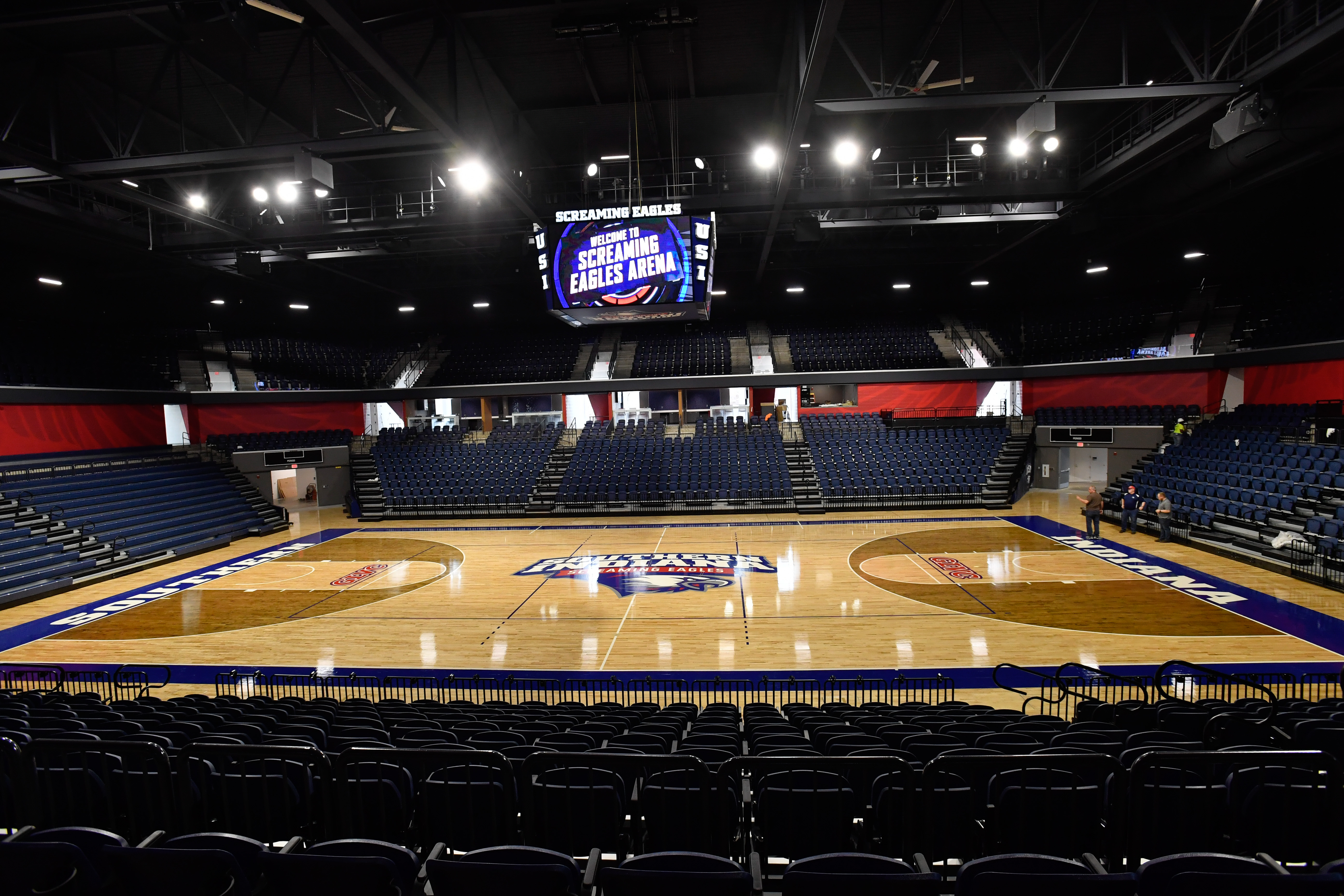
Screaming Eagles Arena

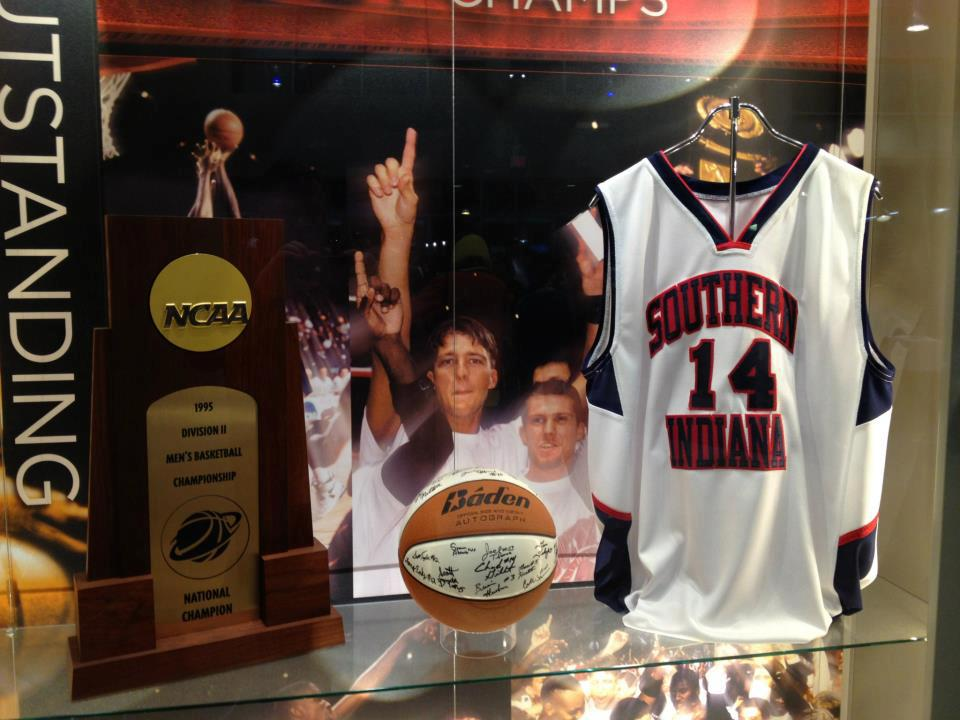
Display case at the Ford Center in Downtown Evansville, honoring USI's national championship in basketball

Men's basketball has been a part of USI's athletic department since the 1970–71 season. The Screaming Eagles are currently one of the most successful basketball programs in Division II athletics. In 1994, USI finished runner-up at the Division II championship and the following year, in 1995, won the national championship. Overall, USI has made 23 NCAA tournament appearances and won the GLVC tournament in 2005, 2007, 2012, and 2014.

USI's success in basketball is due in part to the coaching leadership and legacy of Bruce Pearl, who coached the team from 1992 to 2001. During this nine-year span, USI went to nine straight NCAA D-II tournaments, won four GLVC regular season titles, and compiled a record of 231–46. Pearl's successor, Rick Herdes, led the team to a second-place finish at the 2004 Division II national championship and posted a record of 200–59. However, in 2009, USI submitted to the NCAA a list of NCAA rules violations committed by the men's basketball coaching staff, including Herdes. Three of the violations are related to extra benefits concerning transportation, one concerning academics, and the last concerning improper communication with a prospective student athlete. When the announcement was made, Herdes promptly resigned and was replaced by Rodney Watson.

Despite a one-year probation on postseason play imposed by the GLVC and NCAA, Watson led USI to a 23–0 start and a #2 ranking in the NABC Division II Top 25 Poll, making it the best start for a first-year coach at USI. In his 11 seasons as coach, USI had a 251–82 overall record and a 141–59 record within the conference. Watson's Screaming Eagles made one trip to the Elite Eight during the 2019 NCAA Division II men's basketball tournament, advancing all the way to the Final Four before bowing out to eventually runner-up Point Lima 71–81. Watson is the Screaming Eagles' all-time wins leader and longest tenured coach in program history.

Following Watson's retirement after the 2019–20 season, two time NABC Division II Player of the Year and USI all-time great Stan Gouard was named head basketball coach at his alma mater. Gouard had previously been the head coach at GLVC rival Indianapolis.

USI owns an all-time record of 861–416 following the 2020–21 season.

=== Baseball ===
Southern Indiana joined the Ohio Valley Conference on July 1, 2022

Men's baseball began at USI in 1971. Recently, USI has established itself as a top competitor nationally in Division II. In 2010, the school won the NCAA DII National Championship and won their second NCAA title in 2014, defeating Colorado Mesa by a final score of 3–2 in 12 innings. The team also earned a third-place finish in 2007 under head coach Tracy Archuleta.

=== Softball ===
The USI softball team was started in 1977 and has been under the direction of coach Sue Kunkle for 16 seasons. The team made its first trip to the NCAA Division II Softball Championship in 2017, losing to West Florida in the opening rounds. In 2018, the Screaming Eagles returned to the tournament as an 8-seed and went undefeated in the tournament to capture their first, and the university's first women's national championship, defeating Saint Anselm 4–0 and 8–3 in consecutive games in the final. Sophomore pitcher Jennifer Leonhardt started all five games in the NCAA tournament, including a complete-game no-hitter in her second game against Angelo State.

== Championships ==
=== NCAA ===
USI has won four NCAA national championships (men's basketball, 1995; baseball, 2010 and 2014, women's softball 2018), finished three times as the national finalist (men's basketball, 1994 and 2004; and women's basketball 1997), and earned two third-place finishes (men's cross country, 1982; baseball, 2007). The men's and women's cross country/track teams have produced five individual national championships since 1997.

Association	Division	Sport	Year	Opponent	Score
NCAA	Division II	Men's Basketball	1995	UC Riverside	71–63
NCAA	Division II	Baseball	2010	UC San Diego	6–4
NCAA	Division II	Baseball	2014	Colorado Mesa	3–2
NCAA	Division II	Softball	2018	Saint Anselm	4–0; 8–3

=== Great Lakes Valley Conference ===
The Screaming Eagles won the 2003–04 GLVC All-Sports Trophy by nine points, the largest margin of victory since Lewis University edged USI by 9.5 points in 1986–87. In the 25-year history of the trophy, USI has finished first three times (2003–04, 1993–94, 1982–83); second nine times; third twice; and fourth three times.
