= Chicago State Cougars men's soccer =

American college soccer team

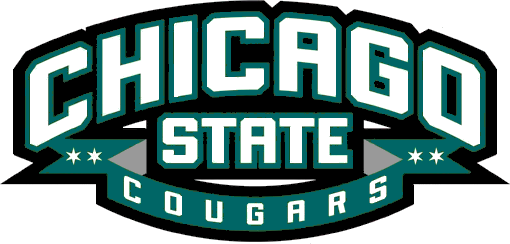
- Founded: 2020; 6 years ago
- University: Chicago State University
- Head coach: Norris Howze (3rd season)
- Conference: NEC
- Location: Chicago, Illinois, US
- Stadium: SeatGeek Stadium (capacity: 20,000)
- Nickname: Cougars
- Colors: Green and white
Home	Away

The Chicago State Cougars men's soccer program represents the Chicago State University in all NCAA Division I men's college soccer competitions. The Cougars soccer team began play in NCAA Division I in the 2020–21 season and the Western Athletic Conference in the 2021 season. CSU moved to the Mid-American Conference (MAC) as a men's soccer affiliate for the 2022 season. After that season, the MAC shut down its men's soccer league, and the Cougars joined the newly formed men's soccer league of the Ohio Valley Conference (OVC). They would only play OVC soccer for one season, as Chicago State will become a full member of the Northeast Conference (NEC) in July 2024.

The Cougars play their home matches at SeatGeek Stadium in Bridgeview, Illinois. Norris Howze is the current head coach.

== Roster ==
As of Jul 2026

Note: Flags indicate national team as defined under FIFA eligibility rules; some limited exceptions apply. Players may hold more than one non-FIFA nationality.

No.	Pos.	Nation	Player
0	GK	USA	Aiden Hollander
1	GK	USA	Johan Rodriguez
2	DF	USA	Efrain Rivas
3	DF	USA	Maxx Peters
4	DF	USA	Brayan Cuevas-Tapia
5	DF	USA	Joshua Ceniceros
6	MF	CAN	Kaeden Talebi
7	DF	USA	Victor Herrera
8	MF	USA	Thomas Herzog
9	FW	USA	Jack Geist
10	MF	KEN	Bill Okumu
11	MF	USA	Salvador Medrano
12	DF	USA	Lucas Lainez
13	MF	CAN	Karma Bhagentsang
15	MF	USA	Bryan Pena
16	DF	USA	Zephyn Brockert-Kress
17	FW	KEN	Hillary Odhiambo

No.	Pos.	Nation	Player
18	MF	USA	Owen Santos
19	FW	TOG	Arafath Ouro-Gnao
20	DF	SSD	Jacob Deng
21	FW	USA	Jorge Leon
22	MF	USA	Aaron Zhao
23	DF	USA	Jayden Quezada
24	DF	USA	Alex Alamillo
25	MF	USA	Mason Radulski
26	DF	USA	Justin Frazilus
27	MF	USA	Saul Silva
28	FW	USA	Yaseen Ads
30	GK	USA	Bryant Garcia
31	DF	USA	Rylan Ross
32	DF	USA	Alex Mutalibov

== History ==
Chicago State University announced on June 23, 2020, that it would finally begin a men's soccer team, effective immediately. This fulfilled the school's commitment to add the sport when joining the Western Athletic Conference in 2014. CSU had later budgeted for a team in 2016, but the school did not then begin play due to financial challenges and seriously discussed leaving Division I. The decision to finally add men's soccer came at the same time the school dropped baseball due to fallout from the COVID-19 pandemic. The Cougars were to play in their full-time home of the WAC, but did not begin conference play until 2021. The school later announced that it would depart the WAC in June 2022.

The team's first head coach, Trevor Banks, stepped down on February 25, 2022.

On May 27, 2022, the Cougars announced they would move their soccer program to the Mid-American Conference and play as an affiliate member in that sport only.

In March 2023, the Ohio Valley Conference announced it would launch a men's soccer league in the 2023 fall season with Chicago State as one of its eight members. The 2023 season proved to be the Cougars' only season in OVC men's soccer; the university ended its two-year stint as an all-sports independent by joining the Northeast Conference effective in 2024.

== Seasons ==
Season	Coach	Overall	Conference	Standing	Postseason
Independent (2020-21)
2020-21	Trevor Banks	1–2–0	–	–	–
Western Athletic Conference (2021)
2021	Trevor Banks	2–13–3	0–9–2	12th	–
WAC Total:		2–13–3	0–9–2		
Mid-American Conference (2022)
2022	Norris Howze	1–13–3	0–8–0	5th	–
MAC Total:		1–13–3	0–8–0		
Ohio Valley Conference (2023)
2023	Norris Howze	5–10–4	3–4–3	5th	–
OVC Total:		5–10–4	3–4–3		
Northeast Conference (2024–present)
2024	Norris Howze	3–11–1	2–5–1	T–7th	–
2025	Norris Howze	1–15–1	1–7–1	T–9th	–
NEC Total:		4–26–2	3–12–2		
Total:		13–64–12			
National champion Postseason invitational champion Conference regular season champion Conference regular season and conference tournament champion Division regular season champion Division regular season and conference tournament champion Conference tournament champion
