= University of Southern Indiana =

Public university in Evansville, Indiana, U.S.

- Motto: Knowledge for Life
- Type: Public university
- Established: September 15, 1965; As Indiana State University–Evansville; April 16, 1985; As University of Southern Indiana
- Academic affiliations: CUMU; Space-grant
- Endowment: $155 million (2021)
- President: Steven J. Bridges
- Provost: Shelly B. Blunt
- Faculty: 677
- Students: 9,286 (fall 2023)
- Undergraduates: 5,409 (fall 2023)
- Postgraduates: 1,854 (fall 2023)
- Location: Evansville, Indiana, United States; 37°57′45″N 87°40′39″W
- Campus: 1,400 acres (6 km^{2}); Suburban
- Colors: Cardinal, Navy, White
- Nickname: Screaming Eagles
- Sporting affiliations: NCAA Division I – OVC; Summit League (Men's soccer, swimming & diving); Horizon League (Men's tennis)
- Mascot: Archibald Eagle (Archie)
- Website: usi.edu

The University of Southern Indiana (USI) is a public university just outside of Evansville, Indiana, United States. Founded in 1965, USI enrolls 9,750 dual credit, undergraduate, graduate and doctoral students in more than 130 areas of study. USI offers programs through the College of Liberal Arts, Romain College of Business, College of Nursing and Health Professions and the Pott College of Science, Engineering, and Education.

USI is classified among "M1 – Master's Colleges and Universities: Larger programs". It is also classified among "community-engaged" institutions.

Since the 2022–2023 school year, USI athletic teams participated in Division I of the NCAA as a member of the Ohio Valley Conference. The teams are known as the Screaming Eagles. Previously, USI participated in Division II as a member of the Great Lakes Valley Conference.

== History ==
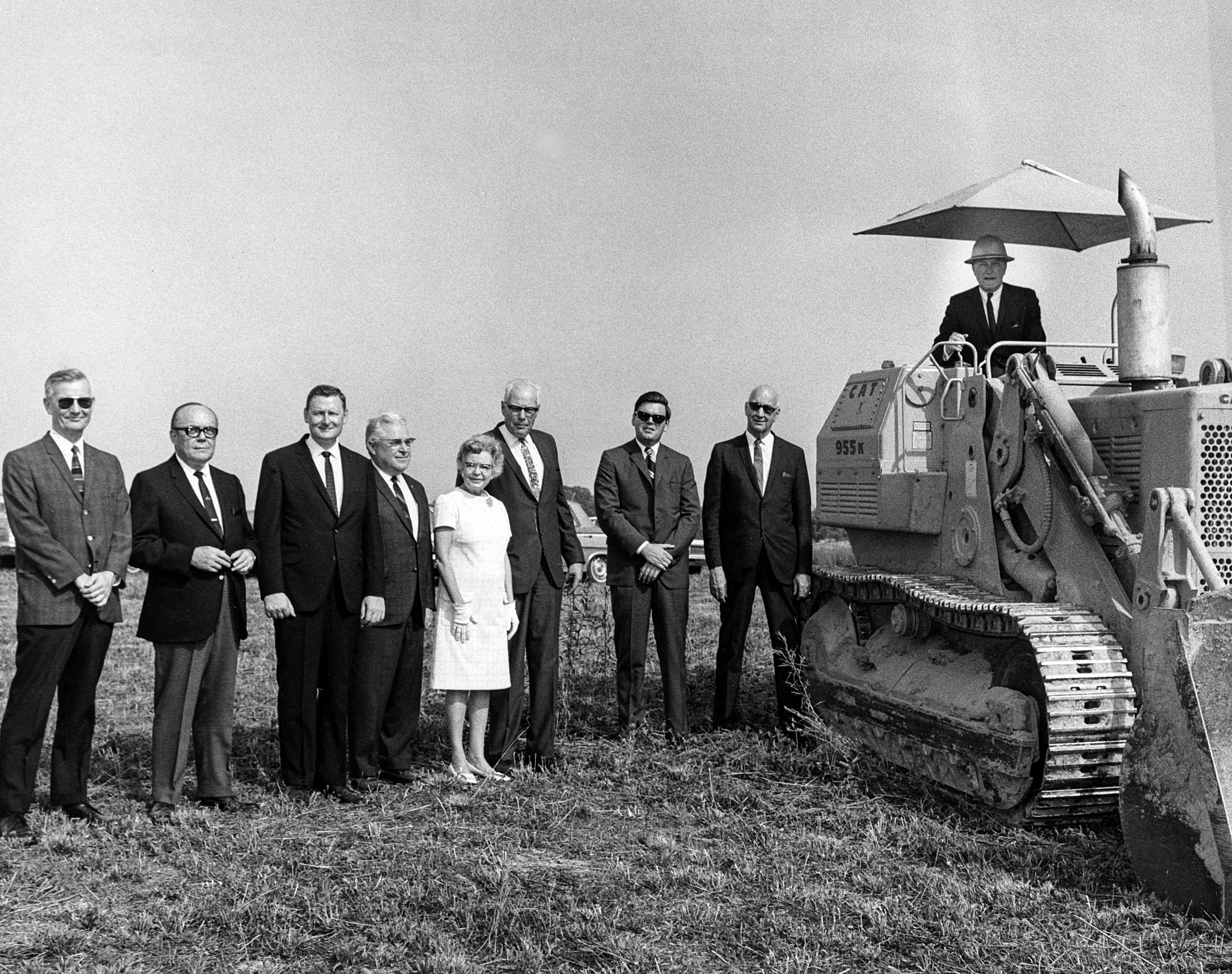
Groundbreaking ceremonies

The University of Southern Indiana began as a regional campus of Indiana State University, opening on September 15, 1965. In 1967, Southern Indiana Higher Education, Inc. (SIHE) raised nearly $1 million to acquire 1,400 acres for the Mid-America University Center. Groundbreaking was held June 22, 1968. Since September 1969, the university has occupied 330 acres, mostly donated by SIHE. The first buildings constructed were the Science Center and the Wright Administration Building. Slowly the school built facilities, as funding became available during the Indiana State University–Evansville period.

In 1985, ISU–Evansville became an autonomous four-year institution, the University of Southern Indiana. Governor Robert D. Orr, an Evansville native, signed the newly independent school's charter. Since gaining its independence, USI's growth has continued to where it is now the fastest growing comprehensive university in the state. The university established student housing, diversified the programs offered, and enrollment has more than doubled since gaining its independence.

In October 2006, the university completed a master plan that provides the framework to double the size of the school and support a campus of over 20,000 students. The master plan features key planning principles to guide the university and help it create a cohesive campus as it continues to grow.

Linda L. M. Bennett was USI's third president, retiring in 2017. Ronald S. Rochon followed her in office.

== Academics ==
USI offers over 70 undergraduate majors, 13 master's programs, and 2 doctoral programs as of the fall 2018 semester. Divisions of the university include the Romain College of Business, College of Liberal Arts, College of Nursing and Health Professions, Pott College of Science, Engineering, and Education, University Division, and Division of Outreach and Engagement. USI employs 652 full-time faculty, lecturers, and academic administrators, and 239 part-time faculty.

== Student life ==
Total USI enrollment was 11,033 for the 2017 fall semester, which included students in undergraduate and graduate degree programs and 2,016 students enrolled in USI's College Achievement Program (CAP) classes in 27 high schools across Indiana. Students at USI represented 90 Indiana counties, 39 states and 70 countries. Out of state enrollment, including international students, made up approximately 17% of the student population and minority and international students comprised more than 14%.

More than 40,000 students have graduated since 1971.

== Campus ==
USI's campus, located on 1400 acres (5.7 km^{2}) of land west of Evansville, is accessed by University Parkway off of the Lloyd Expressway (IN-62). It is marked at the center by University Center East and West, which houses conference space, campus dining, offices and the campus store and by Reflection Lake to the west.

South of the University Center is the Quad, an open-air lawn flanked by David L. Rice Library (completed in 2006) and academic buildings for the College of Liberal Arts and Romain College of Business. Academic buildings for the College of Nursing and Health Professions and Pott College, as well as university administration and forum classrooms, are located north of University Center.

=== Historic New Harmony ===
USI manages programs and properties in Historic New Harmony, site of two historic communal societies of the early 19th century, the Harmony Society and the Robert Owen/William Maclure communal experiment.

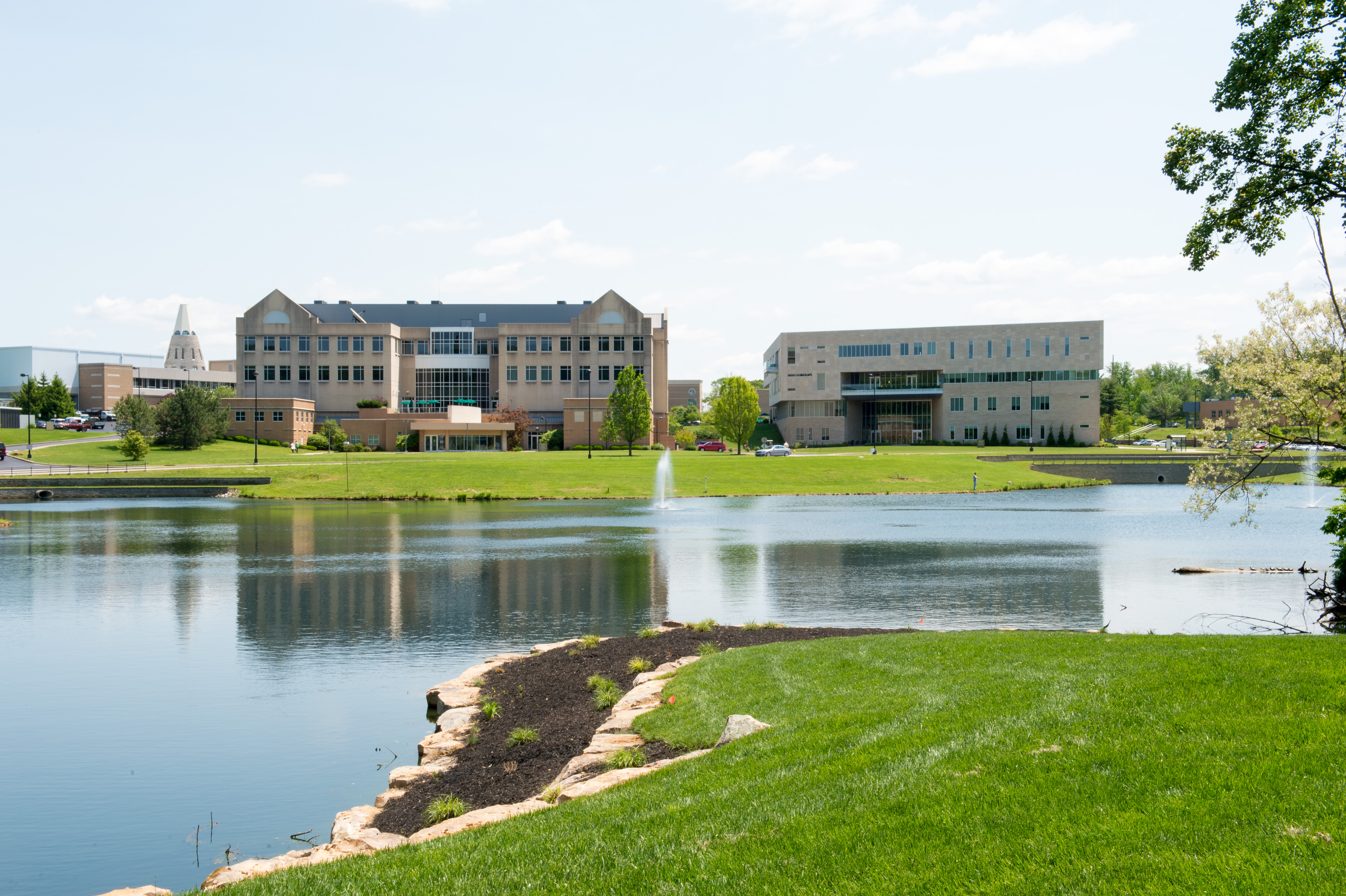
Liberal Arts Center and Business and Engineering Center

Rice Hall, Campus Library

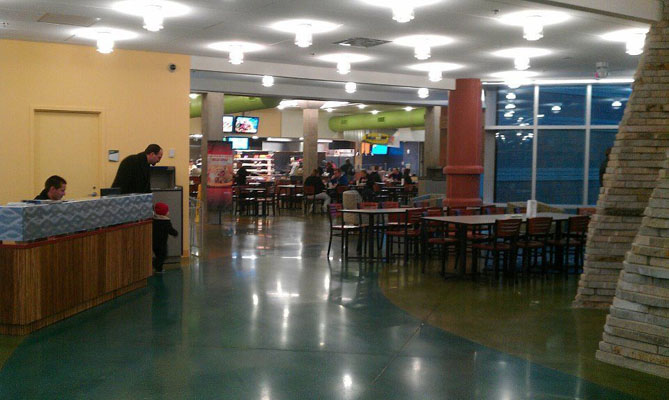
USI's University Center

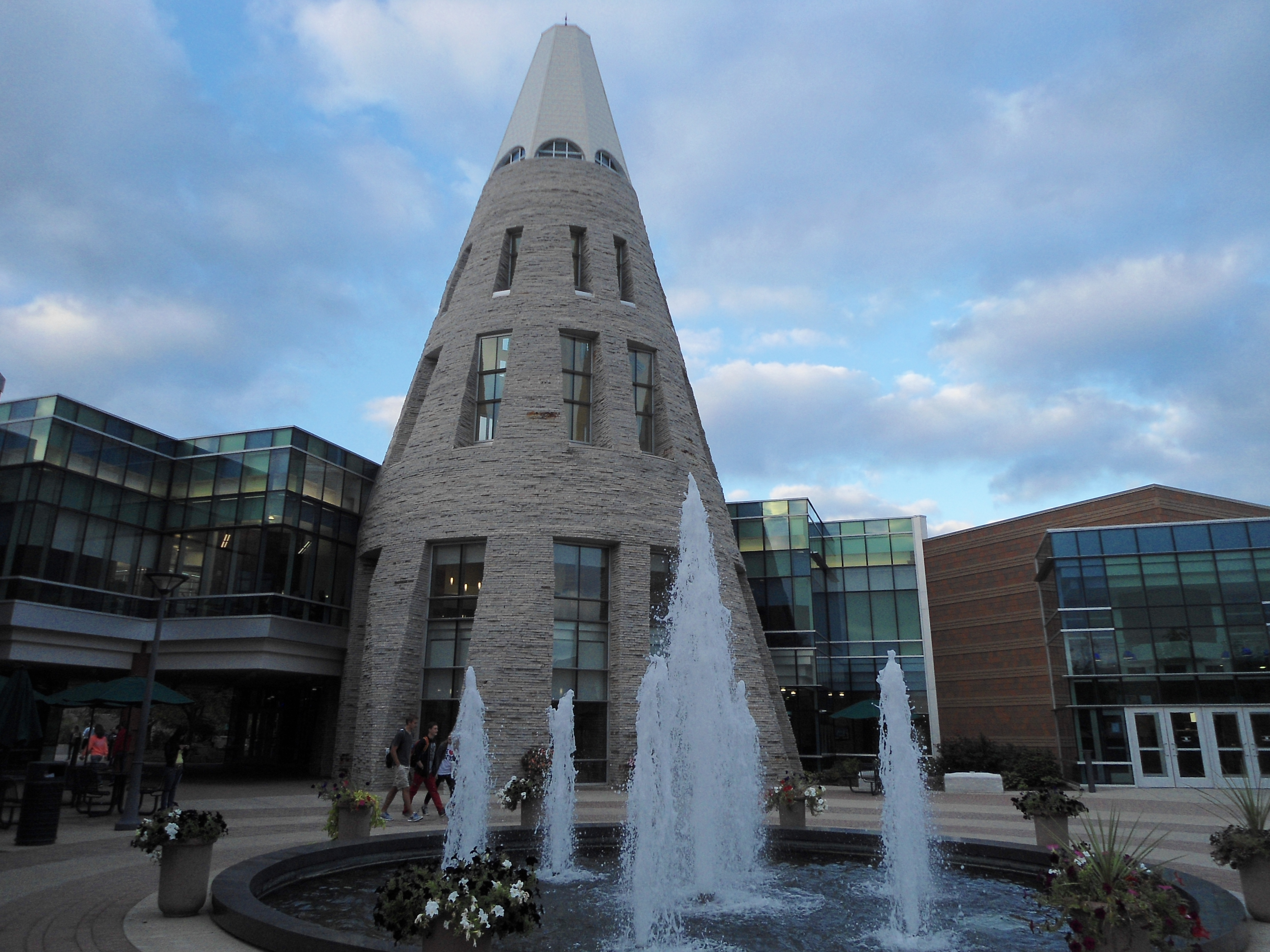
The Cone

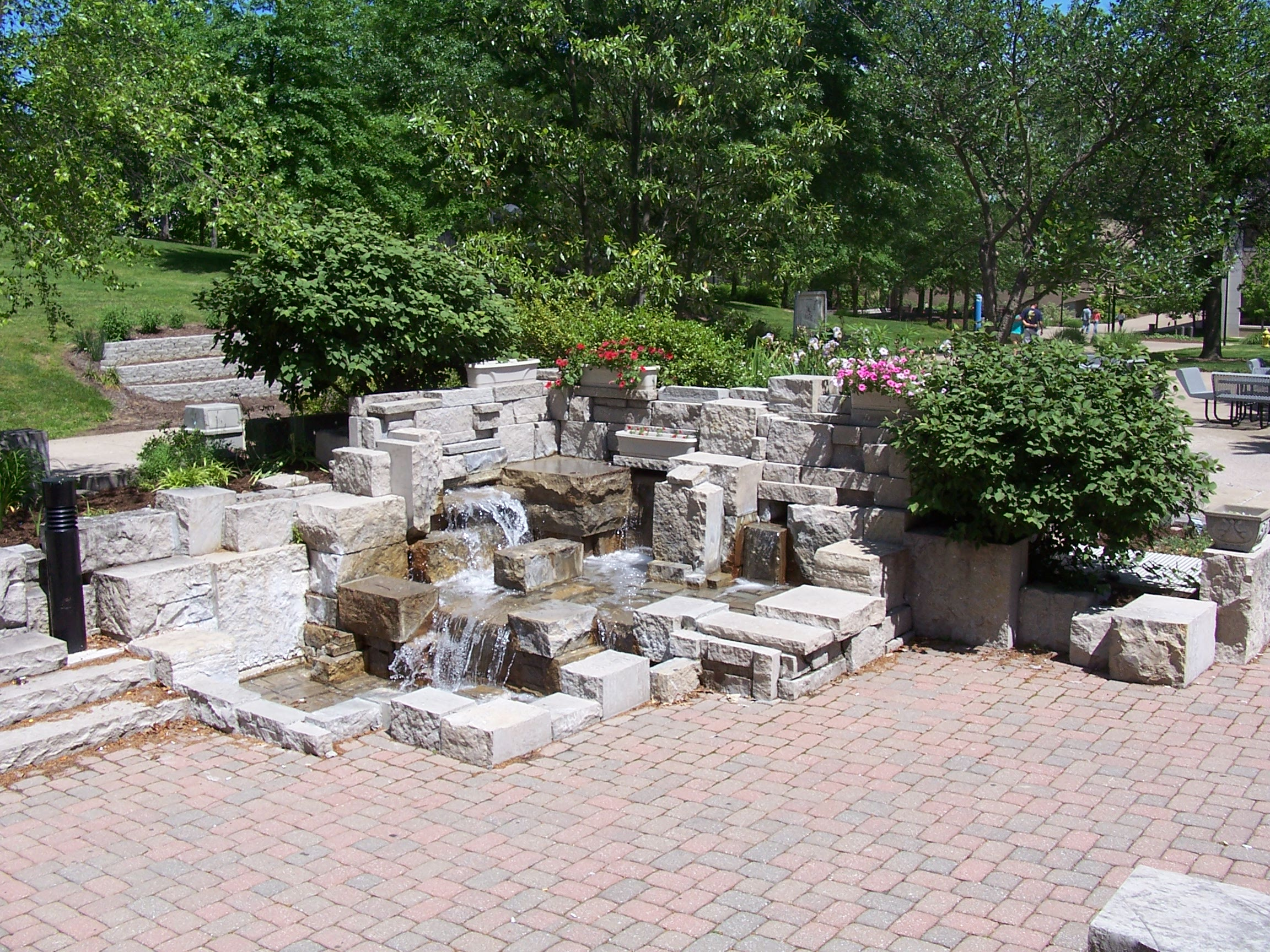
Fountain and plaza area

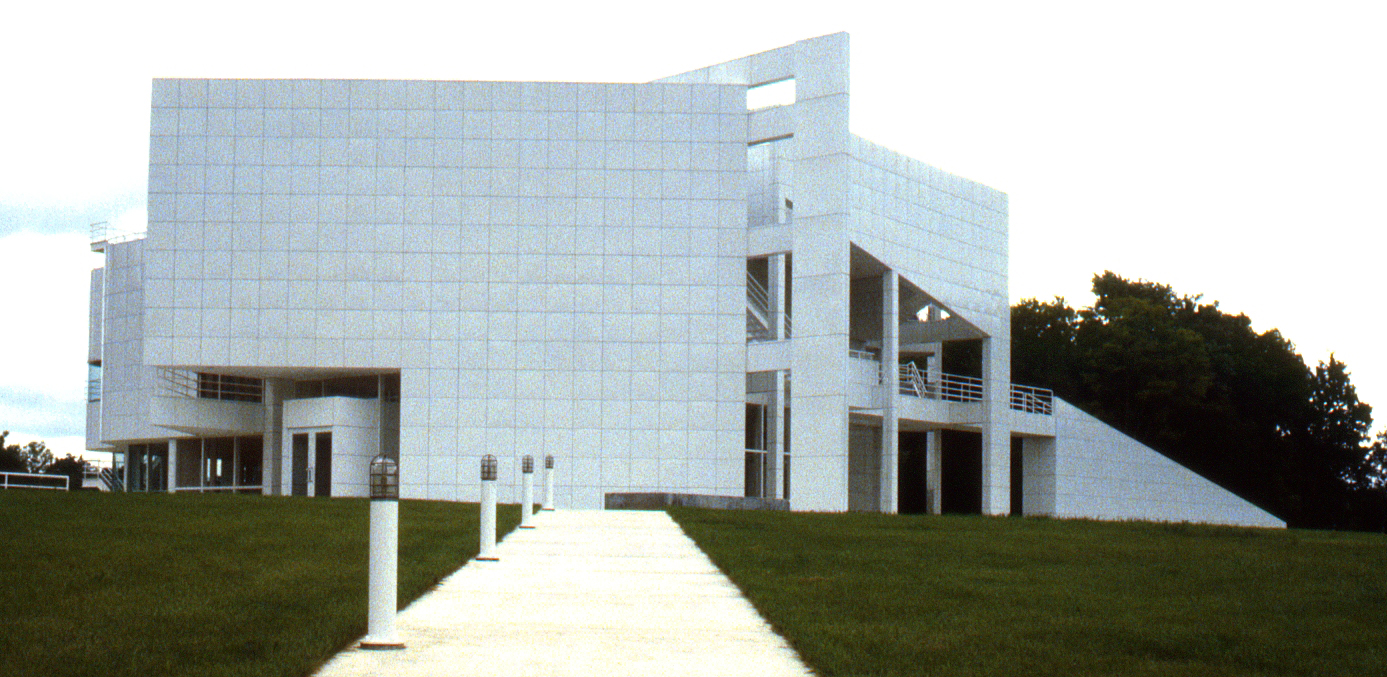
The Atheneum, home of Historic New Harmony

== Athletics ==
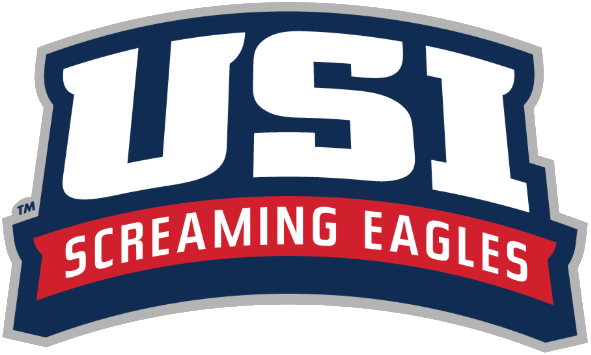

The athletic teams of USI are known as the "Screaming Eagles". The university competes at the NCAA Division I level as members of the Ohio Valley Conference beginning in 2025. USI sponsors 17 varsity intercollegiate sports.

The NCAA Division II Softball National Championship in 2018 marked the first softball team in Indiana to win an NCAA championship. The national championship in baseball in 2010 marked the first GLVC member and university in the state of Indiana to win such a title, repeating in 2014 to become the first NCAA D-II program to win multiple team titles. The men's basketball NCAA D-II National Championship in 1995 garnered 3.9 million viewers watching them on CBS Sports.

USI boasts a strong academic record as well, with 228 Academic All-GLVC athletes in 2021–22 and 35 Academic All-America honors. Student athletes maintain an average GPA of 3.29 and are retained at a high percentage.

The university has competitive teams in baseball, basketball (m/w), Cross country (m/w), Golf (m/w), soccer (m/w), tennis (m/w), track and field (m/w), softball, and volleyball (w).

== Notable alumni ==
- Vaneta Becker, member of the Indiana Senate.
- Kevin Brown, baseball player.
- Brad Ellsworth, politician.
- Stan Gouard, basketball player and coach.
- Cindy Ledbetter, politician.
- Darin Mastroianni, baseball player.
- Wendy McNamara, politician.
- Tim O'Brien, politician.
- Zach Payne, politician.
- Vince Russo, wrestler.
- Jeff Schulz, baseball player.
- Jamar Smith, basketball player.
- Robert Titzer, author.
- Duncan Bray, soccer player.
