= 2023 Atlantic Coast Conference men's soccer season =

- League: NCAA Division I
- Sport: Soccer
- Duration: August 25, 2023 – October 28, 2023
- Teams: 12

2024 MLS SuperDraft
- Top draft pick: Wayne Fredrick, 2nd overall
- Picked by: Colorado Rapids

Regular season
- Season champions: Atlantic:Wake Forest; Coastal:Notre Dame
- Runners-up: Atlantic:Clemson; Coastal:Virginia
- Season MVP: Offensive:Forster Ajago; Midfielder:Jeorgio Kocevski & Mouhameth Thiam; Defensive:Garrison Tubbs
- Top scorer: Forster Ajago

ACC tournament
- Champions: Clemson
- Runners-up: North Carolina
- Finals MVP: (Senegal) Ousmane Sylla

ACC men's soccer seasons
- ← 2022 2024 →

2023 ACC men's soccer standings
	Conf.					Overall
Team	W		L		T	W		L		T
Atlantic
No. 15 Wake Forest +	4	–	1	–	3	11	–	3	–	5
No. 1 Clemson ‡	4	–	2	–	2	15	–	3	–	5
No. 25 Syracuse +	2	–	1	–	5	9	–	5	–	7
No. 24 Louisville +	2	–	4	–	2	12	–	6	–	3
NC State	1	–	5	–	2	6	–	9	–	3
Boston College	0	–	5	–	3	3	–	9	–	5
Coastal
No. 2 Notre Dame +	6	–	0	–	2	13	–	3	–	6
No. 13 Virginia +	5	–	2	–	1	11	–	4	–	4
No. 20 Duke+	4	–	3	–	1	11	–	4	–	3
No. 6 North Carolina +	2	–	3	–	3	11	–	3	–	7
Pittsburgh +	2	–	3	–	3	6	–	7	–	4
Virginia Tech	2	–	5	–	1	4	–	9	–	4
‡ – ACC tournament champion + – Also invited to the 2023 NCAA tournament; As of December 12, 2023; Rankings from United Soccer Coaches; Source: The ACC

The 2023 Atlantic Coast Conference men's soccer season was the 70th season of men's varsity soccer in the conference.

Syracuse were the defending regular season champions of the Atlantic Division and Wake Forest were the defending regular season champions of the Coastal Division. Syracuse were the defending ACC tournament champions. Syracuse went on to win the 2022 NCAA tournament and entered the season as defending national champions on top of their league titles.

Wake Forest repeated as champions of the Atlantic Division and Notre Dame won the Coastal Division regular season title. Neither of those two teams could use their regular season championships to win the ACC tournament title, as Clemson won as the fourth seed. Nine ACC teams would go on to qualify for the NCAA tournament. Notre Dame and Clemson both qualified for the College Cup and both won their Semifinal victories to face-off in the National Championship game. Clemson would go on to win the game 2–1. This was Clemson's second title in three years, and it marked the third straight year that an ACC team won the college soccer championship.

== Teams ==
=== Stadiums and locations ===
Atlantic Division
Team	Stadium	Capacity
Boston College	Newton Campus Soccer Field	1,800
Clemson	Riggs Field	6,500
Louisville	Lynn Stadium	5,300
NC State	Dail Soccer Field	3,000
Syracuse	SU Soccer Stadium	1,500
Wake Forest	Spry Stadium	3,000

Coastal Division
Team	Stadium	Capacity
Duke	Koskinen Stadium	7,000
North Carolina	Dorrance Field	4,200
Notre Dame	Alumni Stadium	2,500
Pittsburgh	Ambrose Urbanic Field	735
Virginia	Klöckner Stadium	7,100
Virginia Tech	Thompson Field	2,500

Note: Florida State, Georgia Tech and Miami (FL) are members of the Atlantic Coast Conference but do not sponsor men's soccer.

=== Personnel ===
Team	Head coach	Years at school	Overall record	Record at school	ACC record
Boston College	Bob Thompson	4	11–16–8	11–16–8	4–11–6
Clemson	Mike Noonan	14	362–191–72	153–78–36	56–40–16
Duke	John Kerr Jr.	16	219–155–48	139–96–35	54–53–20
Louisville	John Michael Hayden	5	34–29–7	34–29–7	17–16–3
North Carolina	Carlos Somoano	13	156–55–36	145–55–36	59–23–20
NC State	George Kiefer	7	205–137–68	43–43–21	11–29–13
Notre Dame	Chad Riley	6	51–36–11	51–36–11	18–21–5
Pittsburgh	Jay Vidovich	8	276–109–40	69–55–9	24–27–7
Syracuse	Ian McIntyre	14	228–149–69	121–85–40	25–41–19
Virginia	George Gelnovatch	28	361–152–67	361–152–67	100–72–35
Virginia Tech	Mike Brizendine	15	102–122–35	102–122–35	26–72–20
Wake Forest	Bobby Muuss	9	204–87–37	129–31–13	48–11–8

Notes

- Records shown are prior to the 2023 season
- Years at school includes the 2023 season
- ACC records include only years with current school.

== Preseason ==
=== Hermann Trophy ===
The ACC placed five players on the watch-list, which was announced on August 24.

Player	Class	Position	School
Gage Guerra	Junior	FW	Louisville
Alex Meinhard	Senior	FW	Clemson
Filip Mirkovic	Junior	MF	Pittsburgh
Garrison Tubbs	Senior	DF	Wake Forest
Vemund Hole Vik	Graduate Student	DF	North Carolina

=== Preseason Poll ===
The 2023 ACC Preseason Poll was released on August 16, 2023 prior to the season beginning. Full results of the poll are shown below:

Atlantic Division
Predicted finish	Team	Votes (1st place)
1	Clemson	58 (5)
2	Wake Forest	56 (3)
3	Syracuse	53 (4)
4	Louisville	34
5	Boston College	23
6	NC State	22

Coastal Division
Predicted finish	Team	Votes (1st place)
1	Pittsburgh	56 (5)
2	Duke	51 (3)
3	Virginia	50 (3)
4	North Carolina	39 (1)
5	Notre Dame	28
6	Virginia Tech	22

Media poll (ACC Championship)
Team	Votes
Clemson	6
Wake Forest	2
Duke	1
Pittsburgh	1
Syracuse	1
Virginia	1

=== Preseason awards ===
Preseason All-ACC Watchlist

Position	Player	Class	School
Goalkeeper	Connor Jordan-Hyde	(redshirt) Senior	Virginia Tech
Defender	Paddy Burns	Senior	Notre Dame
Midfielder	Augustine Boadi	Sophomore	Boston College
Midfielder	Ousmane Sylla	Senior	Clemson
Midfielder	Nick Pariano	Senior	Duke
Midfielder	Sander Roed	Junior	Louisville
Midfielder	Sam Williams	Sophomore	North Carolina
Midfielder	Will Buete	Junior	NC State
Midfielder	Filip Mirkovic	Senior	Pittsburgh
Midfielder	Giona Leibold	Junior	Syracuse
Midfielder	Hosei Kijima	Senior	Wake Forest
Forward	Leo Afonso	Senior	Virginia

== Regular season ==
Index to colors and formatting
ACC member won
ACC member lost
ACC member tied
ACC teams in **bold**

All times Eastern time.

=== Week 1 (Aug. 22 – Aug. 28) ===
Date	Time (ET)	Visiting team	Home team	Site	Result	Attendance
August 24	4:00 p.m.	Merrimack	**Boston College**	Newton Soccer Complex • Chestnut Hill, MA	**W** 1–0	551
August 24	4:00 p.m.	UCLA	**Virginia Tech**	Sentara Park • Harrisonburg, VA	**L** 1–4	170
August 24	6:00 p.m.	Iona	**No. 15 Virginia**	Klöckner Stadium • Charlottesville, VA	**W** 1–0	1,980
August 24	7:00 p.m.	Grand Canyon	**No. 18 Wake Forest**	Spry Stadium • Winston-Salem, NC	**W** 3–1	1,324
August 24	7:00 p.m.	Penn State	**No. 5 Pittsburgh**	Ambrose Urbanic Field • Pittsburgh, PA	**T** 1–1	2,000
August 24	7:00 p.m.	Providence	**No. 1 Syracuse**	SU Soccer Stadium • Syracuse, NY	**W** 2–0	1,276
August 24	7:00 p.m.	UCF	**No. 9 Clemson**	Riggs Field • Clemson, SC	**L** 1–2	4,090
August 24	7:30 p.m.	Loyola (MD)	**North Carolina**	Dorrance Field • Chapel Hill, NC	**T** 1–1	3,335
August 24	7:30 p.m.	No. 16 Tulsa	**Louisville**	Lynn Stadium • Louisville, KY	**W** 1–0	687
August 24	8:00 p.m.	No. 2 Indiana	**Notre Dame**	Alumni Stadium • Notre Dame, IN	**T** 1–1	2,092
August 25	7:00 p.m.	Radford	**NC State**	Dail Soccer Field • Raleigh, NC	**W** 3–1	1,447
August 25	7:30 p.m.	Jacksonville	**No. 4 Duke**	Koskinen Stadium • Durham, NC	**W** 3–1	1,023
August 27	12:00 p.m.	Duquesne	Virginia Tech	Sentara Park • Harrisonburg, VA	**L** 1–5	133
August 27	2:30 p.m.	Furman	**No. 4 Duke**	Koskinen Stadium • Durham, NC	**W** 6–0	1,129
August 27	6:00 p.m.	California	**No. 18 Wake Forest**	Spry Stadium • Winston-Salem, NC	**T** 1–1	1,352
August 27	7:00 p.m.	Loyola Marymount	**No. 15 Virginia**	Klöckner Stadium • Charlottesville, VA	**L** 1–3	1,445
August 27	7:00 p.m.	IUPUI	**Notre Dame**	Alumni Stadium • Notre Dame, IN	**W** 5–0	512
August 27	7:30 p.m.	American	**North Carolina**	Dorrance Field • Chapel Hill, NC	Cancelled	
August 28	4:00 p.m.	**Boston College**	Quinnipiac	Quinnipiac Soccer Stadium • Hamden, CT	**L** 1–3	325
August 28	7:00 p.m.	Binghamton	**No. 1 Syracuse**	SU Soccer Stadium • Syracuse, NY	**W** 3–0	1,422
August 28	7:00 p.m.	Howard	**No. 5 Pittsburgh**	Ambrose Urbanic Field • Pittsburgh, PA	**W** 5–0	734
August 28	7:00 p.m.	UNC Wilmington	**No. 9 Clemson**	Riggs Field • Clemson, SC	**T** 1–1	1,575
August 28	7:00 p.m.	USC Upstate	**NC State**	Dail Soccer Field • Raleigh, NC	**W** 3–0	1,804
August 28	7:30 p.m.	Bellarmine	**Louisville**	Lynn Stadium • Louisville, KY	**W** 3–0	887

Players of the Week

Offensive		Defensive	
Player	Team	Player	Team
Forster Ajago	Duke	Alex Svetanoff	Louisville
Matthew Roou	Notre Dame	Alex Svetanoff	Louisville

=== Week 2 (Aug. 29 – Sep. 4) ===
Date	Time (ET)	Visiting team	Home team	Site	Result	Attendance
August 31	7:00 p.m.	Wofford	**No. 3 Duke**	Koskinen Stadium • Durham, NC	**T** 2–2	645
August 31	7:30 p.m.	Loyola (MD)	**Virginia Tech**	Thompson Field • Blacksburg, VA	**T** 1–1	1,357
August 31	8:00 p.m.	George Mason	**Virginia**	Klöckner Stadium • Charlottesville, VA	**W** 1–0	1,473
September 1	4:00 p.m.	**No. 8 Pittsburgh**	Georgetown	Shaw Field • Washington, D.C.	**L** 1–4	977
September 1	5:30 p.m.	Jacksonville	**Boston College**	Newton Soccer Complex • Chestnut Hill, MA	**W** 1–0	486
September 1	7:00 p.m.	**North Carolina**	ETSU	Summers-Taylor Stadium • Johnson City, TN	**W** 2–1	1,127
September 1	7:00 p.m.	NIU	**Notre Dame**	Alumni Stadium • Notre Dame, IN	**W** 1–0	1,301
September 1	7:00 p.m.	No. 20 Penn State	**No. 1 Syracuse**	SU Soccer Stadium • Syracuse, NY	**T** 1–1	2,684
September 1	7:00 p.m.	South Carolina	**Clemson**	Riggs Field • Clemson, SC	**W** 2–0	4,573
September 1	7:00 p.m.	No. 13 UCF	**NC State**	Dail Soccer Field • Raleigh, NC	**L** 1–3	397
September 1	7:00 p.m.	UNC Greensboro	**No. 12 Louisville**	Lynn Stadium • Louisville, KY	**W** 2–0	1,221
September 1	7:30 p.m.	**No. 16 Wake Forest**	No. 20 Maryland	Ludwig Field • College Park, MD	**T** 0–0	4,644
September 3	6:00 p.m.	Davidson	**Virginia Tech**	Thompson Field • Blacksburg, VA	**T** 1–1	950
September 4	4:00 p.m.	**No. 3 Duke**	Princeton	Roberts Stadium • Princeton, NJ	**W** 2–0	1,200
September 4	5:30 p.m.	Green Bay	**Boston College**	Newton Soccer Complex • Chestnut Hill, MA	**T** 0–0	421
September 4	6:00 p.m.	Furman	**No. 16 Wake Forest**	Spry Stadium • Winston-Salem, NC	**W** 5–1	1,360
September 4	7:00 p.m.	Albany	**No. 1 Syracuse**	SU Soccer Stadium • Syracuse, NY	**W** 1–0	1,257
September 4	7:00 p.m.	No. 20 Maryland	**Virginia**	Klöckner Stadium • Charlottesville, VA	**W** 2–1	2,139
September 4	7:00 p.m.	**North Carolina**	VCU	Sports Backers Stadium • Richmond, VA	**W** 4–1	607
September 4	7:00 p.m.	**NC State**	Stetson	Athletic Training Center • DeLand, FL	**L** 0–2	241

Players of the Week

Offensive		Defensive	
Player	Team	Player	Team
Gage Guerra	Louisville	Trace Alphin	Wake Forest

=== Week 3 (Sep. 5 – Sep. 11) ===
Date	Time (ET)	Visiting team	Home team	Site	Result	Attendance
September 5	7:00 p.m.	Detroit Mercy	No. 20 Notre Dame	Alumni Stadium • Notre Dame, IN	**W** 1–0	204
September 5	7:00 p.m.	No. 2 Marshall	Pittsburgh	Ambrose Urbanic Field • Pittsburgh, PA	**L** 1–3	1,081
September 5	7:00 p.m.	Presbyterian	Clemson	Riggs Field • Clemson, SC	**W** 6–0	1,465
September 5	8:00 p.m.	No. 19 Kentucky	No. 7 Louisville	Lynn Stadium • Louisville, KY	**W** 4–2	2,350
September 8	6:00 p.m.	**Boston College**	NC State	Dail Soccer Field • Raleigh, NC	**NCST** 2–0	1,954
September 8	7:00 p.m.	**North Carolina**	Virginia Tech	Thompson Field • Blacksburg, VA	**T** 1–1	2,407
September 8	7:00 p.m.	**Virginia**	No. 10 Duke	Koskinen Stadium • Durham, NC	**DUKE** 2–0	1,569
September 8	8:00 p.m.	**No. 7 Louisville**	No. 4 Syracuse	SU Soccer Stadium • Syracuse, NY	**T** 2–2	1,832
September 9	7:00 p.m.	**Clemson**	No. 20 Notre Dame	Alumni Stadium • Notre Dame, IN	**UND** 3–2	1,703
September 9	7:00 p.m.	**No. 9 Wake Forest**	Pittsburgh	Ambrose Urbanic Field • Pittsburgh, PA	**PITT** 3–0	714

Players of the Week

Offensive		Defensive	
Player	Team	Player	Team
Gage Guerra (2)	Louisville	Julian Eyestone	Duke

=== Week 4 (Sep. 12 – Sep. 18) ===
Date	Time (ET)	Visiting team	Home team	Site	Result	Attendance
September 12	7:00 p.m.	**Clemson**	South Florida	Corbett Stadium • Tampa, FL	**W** 3–2	1,239
September 12	7:00 p.m.	Gardner–Webb	**No. 20 Wake Forest**	Spry Stadium • Winston-Salem, NC	**W** 4–0	915
September 12	7:00 p.m.	Howard	**NC State**	Dail Soccer Field • Raleigh, NC	**W** 3–1	412
September 12	7:00 p.m.	**Virginia**	No. 9 James Madison	Sentara Park • Harrisonburg, VA	**T** 1–1	1,464
September 12	7:00 p.m.	Siena	**No. 7 Syracuse**	SU Soccer Stadium • Syracuse, NY	Cancelled	
September 12	8:00 p.m.	Michigan State	**No. 10 Notre Dame**	Alumni Stadium • Notre Dame, IN	**L** 0–1	532
September 15	7:00 p.m.	**No. 8 Duke**	**Clemson**	Riggs Field • Clemson, SC	**CLEM** 2–0	2,953
September 15	7:00 p.m.	**No. 10 Notre Dame**	**North Carolina**	Dorrance Field • Chapel Hill, NC	**T** 1–1	4,298
September 15	7:00 p.m.	**No. 17 Pittsburgh**	**Boston College**	Newton Soccer Complex • Chestnut Hill, MA	**T** 0–0	636
September 15	7:00 p.m.	**Virginia Tech**	**No. 5т Louisville**	Lynn Stadium • Louisville, KY	**VT** 2–1	1,071
September 16	7:00 p.m.	**NC State**	**Virginia**	Klöckner Stadium • Charlottesville, VA	**UVA** 3–1	2,319
September 16	7:00 p.m.	**No. 7 Syracuse**	**No. 20 Wake Forest**	Spry Stadium • Winston-Salem, NC	**T** 1–1	2,217
September 18	7:00 p.m.	Fairleigh Dickinson	**No. 17 Pittsburgh**	Ambrose Urbanic Field • Pittsburgh, PA	**W** 5–1	419

Players of the Week

Offensive		Defensive	
Player	Team	Player	Team
Stephen Annor Gyamfi	Virginia	Timi Adams	Virginia Tech

=== Week 5 (Sep. 19 – Sep. 25) ===
Date	Time (ET)	Visiting team	Home team	Site	Result	Attendance
September 19	5:30 p.m.	Boston University	**Boston College**	Newton Soccer Complex • Chestnut Hill, MA	**T** 2–2	359
September 19	7:00 p.m.	Gardner–Webb	**Clemson**	Riggs Field • Clemson, SC	**W** 7–0	1,173
September 19	7:00 p.m.	Liberty	**No. 14 Wake Forest**	Spry Stadium • Winston-Salem, NC	**W** 3–1	753
September 19	7:00 p.m.	**No. 15 Notre Dame**	No. 4 Akron	First Energy Stadium • Akron, OH	**T** 0–0	2,535
September 19	7:00 p.m.	**No. 7 Syracuse**	Cornell	Charles F. Berman Field • Ithaca, NY	**L** 1–2	915
September 19	7:00 p.m.	UNC Wilmington	**North Carolina**	Dorrance Field • Chapel Hill, NC	**W** 3–0	769
September 19	7:30 p.m.	Evansville	**No. 10 Louisville**	Lynn Stadium • Louisville, KY	**W** 2–0	831
September 20	7:00 p.m.	North Florida	**NC State**	Dail Soccer Field • Raleigh, NC	**W** 1–0	1,298
September 22	7:00 p.m.	**Boston College**	**Virginia Tech**	Thompson Field • Blacksburg, VA	**VT** 1–0	964
September 22	7:00 p.m.	**Clemson**	**No. 14 Wake Forest**	Spry Stadium • Winston-Salem, NC	**WAKE** 1–0	2,528
September 22	7:00 p.m.	**Pittsburgh**	**No. 7 Syracuse**	SU Soccer Stadium • Syracuse, NY	**CUSE** 3–2	1,911
September 22	8:00 p.m.	**Virginia**	**No. 15 Notre Dame**	Alumni Stadium • Notre Dame, IN	**UND** 3–1	1,710
September 24	4:00 p.m.	**No. 11 Duke**	**North Carolina**	Dorrance Field • Chapel Hill, NC	**UNC** 2–1	2,858
September 24	7:00 p.m.	**NC State**	**No. 10 Louisville**	Lynn Stadium • Louisville, KY	**LOU** 5–2	563
September 25	7:00 p.m.	No. 19 Denver	**Pittsburgh**	Ambrose Urbanic Field • Pittsburgh, PA	**W** 3–1	703

Players of the Week

Offensive		Defensive	
Player	Team	Player	Team
Damien Barker John	Louisville	Bryan Dowd	Notre Dame
Quenzi Huerman	North Carolina	Bryan Dowd	Notre Dame

=== Week 6 (Sep. 26 – Oct. 2) ===
Date	Time (ET)	Visiting team	Home team	Site	Result	Attendance
September 26	6:00 p.m.	High Point	**Virginia Tech**	Thompson Field • Blacksburg, VA	**W** 3–2	415
September 26	7:00 p.m.	**No. 10 Wake Forest**	Campbell	Eakes Athletics Complex • Buies Creek, NC	**W** 3–1	307
September 26	7:00 p.m.	Charleston	**No. 21 Duke**	Koskinen Stadium • Durham, NC	**W** 3–2	418
September 26	7:00 p.m.	ETSU	**Virginia**	Klöckner Stadium • Charlottesville, VA	**W** 1–0	1,400
September 27	7:00 p.m.	Gardner-Webb	**NC State**	Dail Soccer Field • Raleigh, NC	**W** 3–1	432
September 29	7:00 p.m.	**No. 8 Louisville**	**Virginia**	Klöckner Stadium • Charlottesville, VA	**UVA** 3–0	1,761
September 29	7:00 p.m.	**No. 18 North Carolina**	**Pittsburgh**	Ambrose Urbanic Field • Pittsburgh, PA	**T** 0–0	1,010
September 29	7:00 p.m.	**No. 7 Syracuse**	**No. 21 Duke**	Koskinen Stadium • Durham, NC	**DUKE** 5–3	1,524
September 29	7:00 p.m.	**Virginia Tech**	**Clemson**	Riggs Field • Clemson, SC	**CLEM** 2–1	2,876
September 29	7:00 p.m.	**No. 10 Wake Forest**	**Boston College**	Newton Soccer Complex • Chestnut Hill, MA	**WAKE** 1–0	207
October 1	7:00 p.m.	**No. 15 Notre Dame**	**NC State**	Dail Soccer Field • Raleigh, NC	**UND** 3–1	1,615
October 2	5:30 p.m.	Suffolk	**Boston College**	Newton Soccer Complex • Chestnut Hill, MA	**W** 2–0	224
October 2	7:00 p.m.	Kansas City	**No. 8 Louisville**	Lynn Stadium • Louisville, KY	**W** 3–2	812

Players of the Week

Offensive		Defensive	
Player	Team	Player	Team
Nick Pariano	Duke	Joey Batrouni	Virginia

=== Week 7 (Oct. 3 – Oct. 9) ===
Date	Time (ET)	Visiting team	Home team	Site	Result	Attendance
October 3	7:00 p.m.	Colgate	No. 18 Syracuse	SU Soccer Stadium • Syracuse, NY	**W** 1–0	784
October 3	7:00 p.m.	Elon	No. 13 North Carolina	Dorrance Field • Chapel Hill, NC	**W** 2–0	814
October 3	7:00 p.m.	No. 16 Hofstra	Virginia	Klöckner Stadium • Charlottesville, VA	**T** 1–1	1,092
October 3	7:00 p.m.	Winthrop	Clemson	Riggs Field • Clemson, SC	**W** 4–1	1,005
October 6	7:00 p.m.	**No. 21 Louisville**	Clemson	Riggs Field • Clemson, SC	**CLEM** 4–0	2,575
October 6	7:00 p.m.	**Virginia**	Boston College	Newton Soccer Complex • Chestnut Hill, MA	**T** 1–1	712
October 6	7:00 p.m.	**Virginia Tech**	No. 20 Pittsburgh	Ambrose Urbanic Field • Pittsburgh, PA	**PITT** 3–1	913
October 6	7:00 p.m.	**No. 6 Wake Forest**	NC State	Dail Soccer Field • Raleigh, NC	**WAKE** 3–0	1,636
October 6	7:30 p.m.	**No. 18 Syracuse**	No. 13 North Carolina	Dorrance Field • Chapel Hill, NC	**CUSE** 1–0	2,387
October 7	7:00 p.m.	**No. 14 Duke**	No. 11 Notre Dame	Alumni Stadium • Notre Dame, IN	**UND** 1–0	1,451

Players of the Week

Offensive		Defensive	
Player	Team	Player	Team
Ousmane Sylla	Clemson	Jahiem Wickham	Syracuse

=== Week 8 (Oct. 10 – Oct. 16) ===
Date	Time (ET)	Visiting team	Home team	Site	Result	Attendance
October 10	6:00 p.m.	Florida Gulf Coast	No. 14 North Carolina	Dorrance Field • Chapel Hill, NC	**W** 3–0	1,114
October 10	6:00 p.m.	William & Mary	Virginia Tech	Thompson Field • Blacksburg, VA	**T** 1–1	315
October 10	7:00 p.m.	American	NC State	Dail Soccer Field • Raleigh, NC	**L** 1–2	295
October 10	7:00 p.m.	Elon	No. 15 Duke	Koskinen Stadium • Durham, NC	**W** 3–0	559
October 10	7:00 p.m.	Oberlin	No. 8 Notre Dame	Alumni Stadium • Notre Dame, IN	**W** 6–0	229
October 10	7:00 p.m.	Ohio State	Louisville	Lynn Stadium • Louisville, KY	**T** 2–2	587
October 10	7:00 p.m.	Temple	No. 10 Syracuse	SU Soccer Stadium • Syracuse, NY	**L** 1–2	352
October 10	7:00 p.m.	Wofford	No. 4 Wake Forest	Spry Stadium • Winston-Salem, NC	**W** 2–0	956
October 10	7:00 p.m.	Yale	Boston College	Newton Soccer Complex • Chestnut Hill, MA	**L** 0–1	211
October 13	6:00 p.m.	**No. 8 Notre Dame**	Virginia Tech	Thompson Field • Blacksburg, VA	**UND** 1–0	2,115
October 13	7:00 p.m.	**Boston College**	Louisville	Lynn Stadium • Louisville, KY	**LOU** 1–0	822
October 13	7:00 p.m.	**No. 11 Pittsburgh**	Virginia	Klöckner Stadium • Charlottesville, VA	**UVA** 2–1	2,551
October 13	8:00 p.m.	**NC State**	No. 15 Duke	Koskinen Stadium • Durham, NC	**DUKE** 2–1	1,457
October 14	7:00 p.m.	**No. 14 North Carolina**	No. 4 Wake Forest	Spry Stadium • Winston-Salem, NC	**WAKE** 1–0	2,454
October 15	1:00 p.m.	**No. 21 Clemson**	No. 10 Syracuse	SU Soccer Stadium • Syracuse, NY	**T** 1–1	1,612

Players of the Week

Offensive		Defensive	
Player	Team	Player	Team
Forster Ajago	Duke	Garrison Tubbs	Wake Forest
Mouhameth Thiam	Virginia	Garrison Tubbs	Wake Forest

=== Week 9 (Oct. 17 – Oct. 23) ===
Date	Time (ET)	Visiting team	Home team	Site	Result	Attendance
October 17	5:00 p.m.	**Virginia Tech**	Queens	Sports Complex at Marion Diehl Park • Charlotte, NC	**W** 3–2	155
October 17	5:30 p.m.	Stonehill	**Boston College**	Newton Soccer Complex • Chestnut Hill, MA	**L** 1–2	236
October 17	6:00 p.m.	**Louisville**	Oakland	Oakland Soccer Field • Rochester, MI	**W** 4–0	100
October 17	7:00 p.m.	Duquesne	**No. 23 Pittsburgh**	Ambrose Urbanic Field • Pittsburgh, PA	**W** 2–0	975
October 17	7:00 p.m.	High Point	**NC State**	Dail Soccer Field • Raleigh, NC	**T** 0–0	373
October 17	7:00 p.m.	**No. 6 Notre Dame**	Michigan	U-M Soccer Stadium • Ann Arbor, MI	**W** 3–0	1,893
October 17	7:00 p.m.	Robert Morris	**No. 3 Wake Forest**	Spry Stadium • Winston-Salem, NC	**W** 5–1	699
October 17	7:00 p.m.	William & Mary	**No. 11 North Carolina**	Dorrance Field • Chapel Hill, NC	**T** 0–0	684
October 18	7:00 p.m.	Yale	**No. 22 Syracuse**	SU Soccer Stadium • Syracuse, NY	**W** 2–0	487
October 20	6:00 p.m.	**Boston College**	**No. 15 Clemson**	Riggs Field • Clemson, SC	**CLEM** 6–0	2,470
October 20	6:00 p.m.	**No. 18 Virginia**	**Virginia Tech**	Thompson Field • Blacksburg, VA	**UVA** 3–0	2,061
October 20	8:00 p.m.	**No. 6 Notre Dame**	**No. 3 Wake Forest**	Spry Stadium • Winston-Salem, NC	**T** 1–1	2,261
October 21	7:00 p.m.	**No. 9 Duke**	**No. 23 Pittsburgh**	Ambrose Urbanic Field • Pittsburgh, PA	**T** 0–0	1,180
October 22	1:00 p.m.	**NC State**	**No. 22 Syracuse**	SU Soccer Stadium • Syracuse, NY	**T** 1–1	320
October 22	5:00 p.m.	**Louisville**	**No. 11 North Carolina**	Dorrance Field • Chapel Hill, NC	**UNC** 2–0	3,887

Players of the Week

Offensive		Defensive	
Player	Team	Player	Team
Stephen Annor Gyamfi	Virginia	Andrew Cordes	North Carolina

=== Week 10 (Oct. 24 – Oct. 30) ===
Date	Time (ET)	Visiting team	Home team	Site	Result	Attendance
October 24	7:00 p.m.	High Point	No. 14 Virginia	Klöckner Stadium • Charlottesville, VA	**W** 3–1	1,094
October 24	7:00 p.m.	Howard	No. 8 Duke	Koskinen Stadium • Durham, NC	**W** 7–0	523
October 24	7:00 p.m.	Radford	Virginia Tech	Thompson Field • Blacksburg, VA	**L** 2–3	642
October 27	7:00 p.m.	**No. 10т Clemson**	NC State	Dail Soccer Field • Raleigh, NC	**T** 1–1	1,289
October 27	7:00 p.m.	**No. 20 Pittsburgh**	No. 5 Notre Dame	Alumni Stadium • Notre Dame, IN	**UND** 6–0	2,224
October 27	7:00 p.m.	**No. 19 Syracuse**	Boston College	Newton Soccer Complex • Chestnut Hill, MA	**T** 1–1	517
October 27	7:00 p.m.	**Virginia Tech**	No. 8 Duke	Koskinen Stadium • Durham, NC	**DUKE** 7–1	1,367
October 27	7:00 p.m.	**No. 3 Wake Forest**	Louisville	Lynn Stadium • Louisville, KY	**T** 2–2	1,052
October 27	7:30 p.m.	**No. 10т North Carolina**	No. 14 Virginia	Klöckner Stadium • Charlottesville, VA	**UVA** 1–0	2,487

Players of the Week

Offensive		Defensive	
Player	Team	Player	Team
Eno Nto	Notre Dame	Aidan O'Connor	Virginia

== Rankings ==
=== United Soccer Coaches ===
Legend
Increase in ranking
Decrease in ranking
Not ranked previous week

	Pre	Wk 1	Wk 2	Wk 3	Wk 4	Wk 5	Wk 6	Wk 7	Wk 8	Wk 9	Wk 10	Wk 11	Final
Boston College													
Clemson	9	RV			RV	RV	RV	21	15	10т	14	14	1 (7)
Duke	4 (1)	3	10	8	11	21	14	15	9	8	8	8	20
Louisville	RV	12	7	5т	10	8	21					20	24
North Carolina						18	13	14	11	10т	13	7	6
NC State													
Notre Dame			20	10	15	15	11	8	6	5	2	4	2 (1)
Pittsburgh	5	8	RV	17	RV	RV	20	11	23	20			
Syracuse	1 (4)	1 (8)	4	7	7	7	18	10	22	19	22	18	25
Virginia	15	RV			RV		RV		18	14	9	11	13
Virginia Tech													
Wake Forest	18	16	9	20	14	10	6	4	3	3	6	6	15

=== Top Drawer Soccer ===
Legend
Increase in ranking
Decrease in ranking
Not ranked previous week

	Pre	Wk 1	Wk 2	Wk 3	Wk 4	Wk 5	Wk 6	Wk 7	Wk 8	Wk 9	Wk 10	Wk 11	Wk 12	Wk 13	Wk 14	Wk 15	Final
Boston College																	
Clemson	4	10	18		23	24	18	15	12	9	14	11	4	3	2	2	1
Duke	5	4	8	3	12	21	12	13	8	8	7	8	11	19	19	19	19
Louisville			19	7	19	13	23					20	24				
North Carolina						19	11	12	13	18	22	15	8	6	6	6	6
NC State																	
Notre Dame				20		22	16	6	4	4	2	4	6	5	5	4	2
Pittsburgh	7	8	11	8	16	16	10	9	15	10	20						
Syracuse	1	1	3	6	5	8	13	11	17	19	24	19	21	24	24	24	24
Virginia					22				22	12	9	12	15	9	12	12	12
Virginia Tech																	
Wake Forest	17	17	14	19	9	5	3	3	3	3	5	7	9	18	18	18	18

== Postseason ==
=== ACC Tournament ===
Semifinals
9	Louisville	1
4	Clemson	5
6	Syracuse	1
7	North Carolina	3

Final
4	Clemson (pen.)	1 (5)
7	North Carolina	1 (4)

=== NCAA tournament ===
Seed	School	First round	2nd Round	3rd Round	Quarterfinals	Semifinals	Championship
2	Notre Dame	BYE	W 2–0 vs. Kentucky – (Notre Dame, IN)	T 0–0 (4–2 PKs) vs. No. 16 Western Michigan – (Notre Dame, IN)	T 1–1 (5–4 PKs) vs. Indiana – (Notre Dame, IN)	W 1–0 vs. Oregon State – (Louisville, KY)	L 1–2 vs. No. 14 Clemson – (Louisville, KY)
3	North Carolina	BYE	W 2–0 vs. Memphis – (Chapel Hill, NC)	T 2–2 (5–3 PKs) vs. No. 17 Hofstra – (Chapel Hill, NC)	L 0–1 vs. Oregon State – (Chapel Hill, NC)		
7	Virginia	BYE	W 2–1 vs. FIU – (Charlottesville, VA)	L 0–1 vs. Indiana – (Charlottesville, VA)			
9	Clemson	BYE	W 3–0 vs. Charlotte – (Clemson, SC)	W 1–0 @ No. 10 New Hampshire – (Durham, NH)	W 2–0 vs. No. 22 Stanford – (Clemson, SC)	W 1–0 vs. No. 5 West Virginia – (Louisville, KY)	W 2–1 vs. No. 4 Notre Dame – (Louisville, KY)
10	Wake Forest	BYE	L 2–3 ^{2OT} vs. Indiana – (Winston-Salem, NC)				
15	Duke	BYE	L 1–2 vs. No. 16 Western Michigan – (Durham, NC)				
	Louisville	W 4–3 vs. Dayton – (Louisville, KY)	L 0–1 @ No. 5 West Virginia – (Morgantown, WV)				
	Pittsburgh	L 2–3 vs. James Madison – (Pittsburgh, PA)					
	Syracuse	W 3–1 vs. Boston University – (Syracuse, NY)	L 0–3 @ No. 10 New Hampshire – (Durham, NH)				
	W–L (%):	2–1–0 (.667)	4–4–0 (.500)	1–1–2 (.500)	1–1–1 (.500)	2–0–0 (1.000)	1–1–0 (.500) Total: 11–8–3 (.568)

=== Awards ===
==== All-ACC awards and teams ====
2023 ACC Men's Soccer Individual Awards
Award	Recipient(s)
Coach of the Year	Chad Riley – Notre Dame
Offensive Player of the Year	Forster Ajago – Duke
Midfielder of the Year	Jeorgio Kocevski – Syracuse; Mouhameth Thiam – Virginia
Defensive Player of the Year	Garrison Tubbs – Wake Forest
Goalkeeper of the Year	Bryan Dowd – Notre Dame
Freshman of the Year	Stephen Annor Gyamfi – Virginia

2023 ACC Men's Soccer All-Conference Teams
First Team	Second Team	Third Team	All-Freshman Team
Ousmane Sylla – Clemson; Forster Ajago – Duke; Nick Pariano – Duke; Quenzi Huerman – North Carolina; Bryan Dowd – Notre Dame; Matthew Roou – Notre Dame; Filip Mirkovic – Pittsburgh; Jeorgio Kocevski – Syracuse; Stephen Annor Gyamfi – Virginia; Mouhameth Thiam – Virginia; Garrison Tubbs – Wake Forest	Brandon Parrish – Clemson; Ulfur Bjornsson – Duke; Amir Daley – Duke; Julian Eyestone – Duke; Damien Barker-John – Louisville; Sander Roed – Louisville; Riley Thomas – North Carolina; Eno Nto – Notre Dame; Trace Alphin – Wake Forest; Jahlane Forbes – Wake Forest; Hosei Kijima – Wake Forest; Roald Mitchell – Wake Forest	Joran Gerbet – Clemson; Pape Mar Boye – Clemson; Nathan Richmond – Clemson; Antino Lopez – Duke; Josh Jones – Louisville; Sam Williams – North Carolina; Bryce Boneau – Notre Dame; Kyle Genenbacher – Notre Dame; Daniel Russo – Notre Dame; Jackson Gilman – Pittsburgh; Lorenzo Boselli – Syracuse	Xavier O'Neil – Boston College; Pape Mar Boye – Clemson; Ulfur Bjornsson – Duke; Julian Eyestone – Duke; Hakim Karamoko – NC State; Nolan Spicer – Notre Dame; Albert Thorsen – Pittsburgh; Stephen Annor Gyamfi – Virginia; Brendan Lambe – Virginia; Noe Uwimana – Virginia Tech; Liam O'Gara – Wake Forest

== MLS SuperDraft ==
The ACC had twenty players selected in the 2024 MLS SuperDraft, which were the most picks from any conference. The ACC also lead all conferences with six first round selections. The twenty selections were the second most in ACC history behind the 2021 MLS SuperDraft.

=== Total picks by school ===
Team	Round 1	Round 2	Round 3	Total
Boston College	–	–	–	–
Clemson	–	2	1	3
Duke	1	1	1	3
Louisville	–	2	1	3
NC State	–	–	–	–
North Carolina	–	–	–	–
Notre Dame	1	–	1	2
Pittsburgh	–	1	–	1
Syracuse	1	1	–	2
Virginia	2	1	–	3
Virginia Tech	–	–	–	–
Wake Forest	1	1	1	3
Total	6	9	5	20

=== List of selections ===
Round	Pick #	MLS team	Player	Position	College
1	2	(Trinidad and Tobago) Wayne Frederick	Colorado Rapids	MF	Duke
1	6	(United States) Bryan Dowd	Chicago Fire	GK	Notre Dame
1	12	(United States) Aidan O'Connor	New York Red Bulls	DF	Virginia
1	17	(Japan) Hosei Kijima	St. Louis City SC	MF	Wake Forest
1	21	(United States) Jeorgio Kocevski	Orlando City SC	MF	Syracuse
1	26	(Ghana) Stephen Annor Gyamfi	Huston Dynamo	FW	Virginia
2	32	(Brazil) Leo Afonso	Inter Miami CF	FW	Virginia
2	33	(Canada) Olu Oyegunle	Atlanta United FC	DF	Syracuse
2	36	(United States) Brandon Parrish	D.C. United	MF	Clemson
2	37	(United States) Damien Barker John	Real Salt Lake	FW	Louisville
2	38	(United States) Jahlane Forbes	Charlotte FC	DF	Wake Forest
2	47	(United States) Josh Jones	Real Salt Lake	DF	Louisville
2	52	(United States) Antino Lopez	Seattle Sounders FC	DF	Duke
2	54	(United States) Filip Mirkovic	Orlando City SC	MF	Pittsburgh
2	55	(Senegal) Ousmane Sylla	Huston Dynamo	MF	Clemson
3	69	(United States) Gage Guerra	Portland Timbers	FW	Louisville
3	70	(United States) Nathan Richmond	Charlotte FC	MF	Clemson
3	75	(United States) Bryce Boneau	Nashville SC	MF	Notre Dame
3	78	(Senegal) Babacar Niang	Minnesota United FC	MF	Wake Forest
3	84	(United States) Ruben Mesalles	Real Salt Lake	DF	Duke

== Homegrown players ==
The Homegrown Player Rule is a Major League Soccer program that allows MLS teams to sign local players from their own development academies directly to MLS first team rosters. Before the creation of the rule in 2008, every player entering Major League Soccer had to be assigned through one of the existing MLS player allocation processes, such as the MLS SuperDraft.

To place a player on its homegrown player list, making him eligible to sign as a homegrown player, players must have resided in that club's home territory and participated in the club's youth development system for at least one year. Players can play college soccer and still be eligible to sign a homegrown contract.

Original MLS team	Player	Pos.	School	Ref.
Atlanta United FC	(United States) Garrison Tubbs	DF	Wake Forest	
Philadelphia Union	(United States) Nick Pariano	MF	Duke	
New York Red Bulls	(United States) Roald Mitchell	MF	Wake Forest	
