= 2023 Notre Dame Fighting Irish men's soccer team =

American college soccer season

2023 Notre Dame Fighting Irish men's soccer

ACC Regular Season Champions

NCAA Tournament, Runner-Up
- Conference: Atlantic Coast Conference
- U. Soc. Coaches poll: No. 2
- TopDrawerSoccer.com: No. 2
- Record: 13–3–6 (6–0–2 ACC)
- Head coach: Chad Riley (6th season)
- Assistant coaches: Mike Graczyk (4th season); Jeff Rowland (3rd season)
- Home stadium: Alumni Stadium

2023 ACC men's soccer standings
	Conf.					Overall
Team	W		L		T	W		L		T
Atlantic
No. 15 Wake Forest +	4	–	1	–	3	11	–	3	–	5
No. 1 Clemson ‡	4	–	2	–	2	15	–	3	–	5
No. 25 Syracuse +	2	–	1	–	5	9	–	5	–	7
No. 24 Louisville +	2	–	4	–	2	12	–	6	–	3
NC State	1	–	5	–	2	6	–	9	–	3
Boston College	0	–	5	–	3	3	–	9	–	5
Coastal
No. 2 Notre Dame +	6	–	0	–	2	13	–	3	–	6
No. 13 Virginia +	5	–	2	–	1	11	–	4	–	4
No. 20 Duke+	4	–	3	–	1	11	–	4	–	3
No. 6 North Carolina +	2	–	3	–	3	11	–	3	–	7
Pittsburgh +	2	–	3	–	3	6	–	7	–	4
Virginia Tech	2	–	5	–	1	4	–	9	–	4
‡ – ACC tournament champion + – Also invited to the 2023 NCAA tournament; As of December 12, 2023; Rankings from United Soccer Coaches; Source: The ACC

The 2023 Notre Dame Fighting Irish men's soccer team represented the University of Notre Dame during the 2023 NCAA Division I men's soccer season. It was the program's 46th season. It was the program's eleventh season competing in the Atlantic Coast Conference. The Fighting Irish were led by head coach Chad Riley, in his sixth year and played their home games at Alumni Stadium in Notre Dame, Indiana.

The Fighting Irish finished the season 13–3–6 overall and 6–0–2 in ACC play to finish in first place in the Coastal Division. As the first overall seed in the ACC Tournament and received a First Round bye. They were defeated by Louisville in the Quarterfinals. They received an at-large bid to the NCAA Tournament and were awarded the second overall seed. After a First Round bye, they defeated Kentucky in the Second Round, Western Michigan on penalties in the Third Round, and Indiana in the Quarterfinals to qualify for their third College Cup in program history. They defeated Oregon State to reach the final where they lost 2–1 to Clemson.

== Background ==
The Fighting Irish finished the season 8–7–2 overall and 3–4–1 in ACC play to finish in fifth place in the Coastal Division. As the ninth overall seed in the ACC Tournament they were defeated by Clemson in the First Round. They were not invited to the NCAA Tournament.

== Player movement ==
=== Players leaving ===
Departures
Name	Number	Pos.	Height	Weight	Year	Hometown	Reason for departure
Reese Mayer	3	DF	6'2"	175	Senior	Baltimore, Maryland	Graduated
Aaron Hill	4	DF	6'3"	190	Senior	Albuquerque, NM	Graduated
PJ Bujouves	22	MF	5'8"	155	Senior	Toronto, Ontario	Graduated
Ben Giacobello	26	MF	5'9"	145	Graduate Student	San Clemente, California	Graduated

=== Players arriving ===
==== Recruiting class ====
Name	Nat.	Hometown	Club	TDS Rating
Nicholas Bartlett; MF	USA	Bloomingdale, Illinois	Sockers FC Chicago	3/5 stars
Jack Flanagan; FW	USA	Rancho Palos Verdes, California	Pateadores	3/5 stars
Lukas Kamrath; DF	USA	Longboat Key, Florida	Tampa Bay United	3/5 stars
Sean McDowd; DF	USA	Lake Oswego, Oregon	Portland Timbers Academy	3/5 stars
Jack Ross; DF	USA	Naples, Florida	Shattuck St. Mary's Academy	3/5 stars
Nolan Spicer; MF	USA	Bay Village, Ohio	Team Challenger FC	3/5 stars
Nate Zimmermann; FW	USA	Mendham, New Jersey	Players Development Academy	3/5 stars

== Squad ==
=== Roster ===
As of January 24, 2024

Note: Flags indicate national team as defined under FIFA eligibility rules; some limited exceptions apply. Players may hold more than one non-FIFA nationality.

No.	Pos.	Nation	Player
0	GK	ITA	Simone Baravelli
1	GK	USA	Owen Cornell
2	DF	USA	Mitch Ferguson
3	DF	USA	Sean McDowd
4	DF	USA	Jack Ross
5	DF	USA	Kyle Genenbacher
6	MF	USA	Wyatt Lewis
7	MF	IRL	Ethan O'Brien
8	MF	CAN	Matthew Radivojsa
9	FW	ENG	Eno Nto
10	MF	USA	Matthew McLaughlin
11	FW	USA	Daniel Russo
12	MF	GHA	Daniel Boateng
13	MF	USA	Bryce Boneau
14	DF	USA	Mo Williams
15	DF	NIR	Paddy Burns
16	MF	GHA	KK Baffour

No.	Pos.	Nation	Player
17	DF	USA	Mateo Acosta
18	DF	USA	Josh Ramsey
19	FW	USA	Michael Rossi
20	FW	USA	Nate Zimmermann
21	FW	USA	Matthew Roou
22	MF	USA	Nolan Spicer
23	FW	USA	Alex Salvino
24	MF	USA	Sebastian Green
25	MF	USA	Nico Bartlett
26	FW	USA	Jack Flanagan
27	FW	USA	Wyatt Borso
28	FW	USA	Nicholas Legendre
29	DF	USA	Cleveland Sellers IV
30	GK	USA	Liam Egan
31	GK	USA	Bryan Dowd
32	DF	USA	Lukas Kamrath
33	MF	USA	Michael Pellegrino

=== Team management ===
Position	Staff
Athletic Director	Jack Swarbrick
Head coach	Chad Riley
Assistant Coach	Mike Graczyk
Assistant Coach	Jeff Rowland
Director of Operations	Chris Rolfe

== Schedule ==
Date Time, TV	Rank^{#}	Opponent^{#}	Result	Record	Site City, State
Exhibition
August 13*; 1:00 p.m.		at No. 24 Saint Louis		–	Hermann Stadium; St. Louis, MO
August 16*; 7:00 p.m.		Holy Cross		–	Alumni Stadium; Notre Dame, IN
August 19*; 7:00 p.m.		Butler		–	Alumni Stadium; Notre Dame, IN
Regular Season
August 24*; 8:00 p.m., ACCN		No. 2 Indiana	T 1–1	0–0–1	Alumni Stadium (2,092); Notre Dame, IN
August 27*; 7:00 p.m., ACCNX		IUPUI	W 5–0	1–0–1	Alumni Stadium (512); Notre Dame, IN
September 1*; 7:00 p.m., ACCNX		NIU	W 1–0	2–0–1	Alumni Stadium (1,301); Notre Dame, IN
September 5*; 7:00 p.m., ACCNX	No. 20	Detroit Mercy	W 1–0	3–0–1	Alumni Stadium (204); Notre Dame, IN
September 9; 7:00 p.m., ACCNX	No. 21	Clemson	W 3–2	4–0–1 (1–0–0)	Alumni Stadium (1,703); Notre Dame, IN
September 12*; 8:00 p.m., ACCN	No. 10	Michigan State	L 0–1	4–1–1	Alumni Stadium (532); Notre Dame, IN
September 15; 7:00 p.m., ACCNX	No. 10	at North Carolina	T 1–1	4–1–2 (1–0–1)	Dorrance Field (4,298); Chapel Hill, NC
September 19*; 7:00 p.m., ESPN+	No. 15	at No. 4 Akron	T 0–0	4–1–3	FirstEnergy Stadium (2,535); Akron, OH
September 22; 8:00 p.m., ACCN	No. 15	Virginia	W 3–1	5–1–3 (2–0–1)	Alumni Stadium (1,710); Notre Dame, IN
October 1; 7:00 p.m., ACCNX	No. 13	at NC State	W 3–1	6–1–3 (3–0–1)	Dail Soccer Field (1,615); Raleigh, NC
October 7; 7:00 p.m., ACCNX	No. 11	No. 14 Duke	W 1–0	7–1–3 (4–0–1)	Alumni Stadium (1,451); Notre Dame, IN
October 10*; 7:00 p.m., ACCNX	No. 8	Oberlin	W 6–0	8–1–3	Alumni Stadium (229); Notre Dame, IN
October 13; 6:00 p.m., ACCN	No. 8	at Virginia Tech	W 1–0	9–1–3 (5–0–1)	Thompson Field (2,115); Blacksburg, VA
October 17*; 7:00 p.m., BTN+	No. 6	at Michigan	W 3–0	10–1–3	Alumni Stadium (1,893); Notre Dame, IN
October 20; 8:00 p.m., ACCN	No. 6	at No. 3 Wake Forest	T 1–1	10–1–4 (5–0–2)	Spry Stadium (2,261); Winston-Salem, NC
October 27; 7:00 p.m., ACCNX	No. 5	No. 20 Pittsburgh	W 6–0	11–1–4 (6–0–2)	Alumni Stadium (2,224); Notre Dame, IN
ACC tournament
November 5; 8:00 p.m., ACCN	(1) No. 2	(9) Louisville; Quarterfinals	L 3–4	11–2–4	Alumni Stadium (794); Notre Dame, IN
NCAA tournament
November 19; 5:00 p.m., ESPN+	(2) No. 4	Kentucky; Second Round	W 2–0	12–2–4	Alumni Stadium (1,243); Notre Dame, IN
November 26; 5:00 p.m., ESPN+	(2) No. 4	No. 16 Western Michigan; Third Round	T 0–0 (4–2 PKs) ^{2OT}	12–2–5	Alumni Stadium (1,768); Notre Dame, IN
December 2; 2:00 p.m., ESPN+	(2) No. 4	Indiana; Quarterfinals	T 1–1 (5–4 PKs) ^{2OT}	12–2–6	Alumni Stadium (3,108); Notre Dame, IN
December 8; 8:30 p.m., ESPN+	(2) No. 4	vs. Oregon State; Semifinals	W 1–0	13–2–6	Lynn Family Stadium (3,853); Louisville, KY
December 11; 6:00 p.m., ESPNU	(2) No. 4	vs. (9) No. 14 Clemson; Final	L 1–2	13–3–6	Lynn Family Stadium (4,449); Louisville, KY
*Non-conference game. ^{#}Rankings from United Soccer Coaches. (#) Tournament seedings in parentheses. All times are in Eastern.

== Awards and honors ==
Recipient	Award	Date	Ref.
Paddy Burns	Pre-Season All-ACC Team	August 26, 2023	
Matthew Roou	ACC Co-Offensive Player of the Week	August 29	
Bryan Dowd	ACC Defensive Player of the Week	September 26	
Eno Nto	ACC Offensive Player of the Week	October 31	
Chad Riley	ACC Coach of the Year	November 8, 2023	
Bryan Dowd	ACC Goalkeeper of the Year	November 8, 2023	
Matthew Roou	All-ACC First Team	November 8, 2023	
Bryan Dowd	All-ACC First Team	November 8, 2023	
Eno Nto	All-ACC Second Team	November 8, 2023	
Bryce Boneau	All-ACC Third Team	November 8, 2023	
Kyle Genenbacher	All-ACC Third Team	November 8, 2023	
Nolan Spicer	All-ACC Freshman Team	November 8, 2023	

== 2024 MLS Super Draft ==
Player	Team	Round	Pick #	Position
(United States) Bryan Dowd	Chicago Fire	1	6	GK
(United States) Bryce Boneau	Nashville SC	3	75	MF

== Rankings ==
Ranking movements Legend: ██ Increase in ranking ██ Decrease in ranking — = Not ranked ( ) = First-place votes
	Week																
Poll	Pre	1	2	3	4	5	6	7	8	9	10	11	12	13	14	15	Final
United Soccer	—	—	20	10	15	15	11	8	6	5	2	4	Not released				2 (1)
TopDrawer Soccer	—	—	—	20	—	22	16	6	4	4	2	4	6	5	5	4	2
