= 2023 Duke Blue Devils men's soccer team =

American college soccer season

2023 Duke Blue Devils men's soccer

NCAA Tournament, Second Round
- Conference: Atlantic Coast Conference
- U. Soc. Coaches poll: No. 20
- TopDrawerSoccer.com: No. 19
- Record: 11–4–3 (4–3–1 ACC)
- Head coach: John Kerr (16th season)
- Assistant coaches: Michael Brady (16th season); Kyle Renfro (4th season)
- Home stadium: Koskinen Stadium

2023 ACC men's soccer standings
	Conf.					Overall
Team	W		L		T	W		L		T
Atlantic
No. 15 Wake Forest +	4	–	1	–	3	11	–	3	–	5
No. 1 Clemson ‡	4	–	2	–	2	15	–	3	–	5
No. 25 Syracuse +	2	–	1	–	5	9	–	5	–	7
No. 24 Louisville +	2	–	4	–	2	12	–	6	–	3
NC State	1	–	5	–	2	6	–	9	–	3
Boston College	0	–	5	–	3	3	–	9	–	5
Coastal
No. 2 Notre Dame +	6	–	0	–	2	13	–	3	–	6
No. 13 Virginia +	5	–	2	–	1	11	–	4	–	4
No. 20 Duke+	4	–	3	–	1	11	–	4	–	3
No. 6 North Carolina +	2	–	3	–	3	11	–	3	–	7
Pittsburgh +	2	–	3	–	3	6	–	7	–	4
Virginia Tech	2	–	5	–	1	4	–	9	–	4
‡ – ACC tournament champion + – Also invited to the 2023 NCAA tournament; As of December 12, 2023; Rankings from United Soccer Coaches; Source: The ACC

The 2023 Duke Blue Devils men's soccer team represented Duke University during the 2023 NCAA Division I men's soccer season. The Blue Devils were led by head coach John Kerr, in his sixteenth season. They played their home games at Koskinen Stadium. The team was founded in 1935 and played the 2023 season in the Atlantic Coast Conference.

The Blue Devils finished the season 11–4–3 overall and 4–3–1 in ACC play to finish in third place in the Coastal Division. As the fifth overall seed in the ACC Tournament, they defeated twelfth seed Boston College in the First Round before losing to eventual champions Clemson on penalties in the Quarterfinals. They received an at-large bid to the NCAA Tournament and were awarded the fifteenth overall seed. Being a seeded team, they received a bye into the Second Round where they were defeated by Western Michigan to end their season.

== Background ==
The Blue Devils finished the season 13–2–4 overall and 5–0–3 in ACC play to finish in first place in the Coastal Division. As the first overall seed in the ACC Tournament, the received a bye into the Quarterfinals where they were upset at home by eighth seed Clemson. They received an at-large bid to the NCAA Tournament and were awarded the seventh overall seed. Being a seeded team, they received a bye into the Second Round where they defeated Denver and then FIU in the Third Round before being upset by unseeded Creighton in the Quarterfinals.

== Player movement ==
=== Players leaving ===
Departures
Name	Number	Pos.	Height	Weight	Year	Hometown	Reason for Departure
Eliot Hamill	1	GK	6'2"	175	Graduate Student	Scarsdale, New York	Graduated
Peter Stroud	8	MF	5'10"	145	Junior	Chester, New Jersey	Signed Professional Contract with New York Red Bulls
Scotty Taylor	9	FW	6'0"	157	Senior	Millburn, New Jersey	Graduated
Josh Kim	13	MF	5'11"	165	Freshman	Whitestone, New York	—
Shak Mohammed	14	MF/FW	5'10"	160	Sophomore	Kumasi, Ghana	Drafted 2nd overall in the 2023 MLS SuperDraft
Santa Ihara	17	MF	5'11"	145	Junior	Tokyo Japan	—
Carl Fisher	20	MF	6'0"	160	Senior	White Plains, New York	Graduated
Daniel Aguilar	21	MF	6'1"	175	Senior	Baltimore, Maryland	Graduated
Alex Bonnington	30	FW	6'1"	180	Freshman	Rotherham, England	Transferred to Boston University
Peter Wentzel	31	GK	6'3"	205	Graduate Student	Ettlingen, Germany	Graduated

=== Players arriving ===
==== Incoming transfers ====
Incoming transfers
Name	Number	Pos.	Height	Weight	Year	Hometown	Previous School
Cameron Fisher	14	MF	6'0"	175	Graduate Student	Scottsdale, Arizona	North Carolina
Forster Ajago	21	FW	6'2"	178	Graduate Student	Navrongo, Ghana	Dayton
Fahmi Ibrahim	26	FW	6'0"	175	Graduate Student	Alameda, California	California

==== Recruiting class ====
Name	Nat.	Hometown	Club	TDS Rating
Ulfur Bjornsson; FW	ISL	Hafnarfjörður, Iceland	Hafnarfjarðar	N/A
Julian Eyestone; GK	USA	Dallas, Texas	FC Dallas Academy	4/5 stars
Nathan Gaviser; GK	USA	Edgemont, New York	FC Westchester	N/A
Bull Jorgensen; MF	NOR	Asker, Norway	Kongsvinger	N/A
Andrew Myerson; MF	USA	Issaquah, Washington	Eastside FC 04 ECNL	N/A

== Squad ==
=== Roster ===
As of January 29, 2024

Note: Flags indicate national team as defined under FIFA eligibility rules; some limited exceptions apply. Players may hold more than one non-FIFA nationality.

No.	Pos.	Nation	Player
0	GK	USA	Grant Farley
00	GK	USA	Jacob Hochstein
1	GK	USA	Julian Eyestone
2	DF	USA	Amir Daley
3	DF	USA	Kamran Acito
4	DF	NIR	Lewis McGarvey
5	MF	USA	Antino Lopez
6	MF	USA	Cameron Kerr
7	MF	USA	Felix Barajas
8	MF	NOR	Bull Jorgensen
9	FW	ISL	Ulfur Bjornsson
10	MF	USA	Nick Pariano
11	FW	BER	Jai Bean
12	MF	USA	Ruben Mesalles
13	FW	USA	Jose Ortega
14	MF	USA	Cameron Fisher

No.	Pos.	Nation	Player
15	FW	USA	Krew Verratti
16	MF	USA	Luke Thomas
17	MF	TRI	Wayne Frederick
18	MF	USA	Bryce Barnum
19	DF	USA	Sintayehu Clements
20	MF	USA	Andrew Myerson
21	FW	GHA	Forster Ajago
22	MF	USA	Drew Kerr
23	MF	USA	Kenan Hot
24	DF	ISL	Axel Gudbjornsson
25	FW	USA	Miguel Ramirez
26	FW	USA	Fahmi Ibrahim
28	MF	USA	Sebastian Docters
29	DF	USA	Nate Mulvaney
30	GK	USA	Nathan Gaviser
32	MF	USA	Jackson Lagos

=== Team management ===
Position	Staff
Athletic Director	(United States) Nina King
Head coach	(United States) John Kerr
Associate head coach	(England) Michael Brady
Assistant Coach	(United States) Kyle Renfro
Volunteer assistant coach	(United States) Tristan Wierbonski

== Schedule ==
Date Time, TV	Rank^{#}	Opponent^{#}	Result	Record	Site (Attendance) City, State
Exhibition
August 12*; 4:00 p.m.	No. 4	at UNC Asheville	W 3–0	—	Greenwood Soccer Field; Asheville, NC
August 16*; 7:00 p.m.	No. 4	UNC Wilmington	W 4–0	—	Koskinen Stadium; Durham, NC
August 18*; 4:00 p.m.	No. 4	at No. 17 Georgetown	T 2–2	—	Shaw Field; Washington, D.C.
Regular season
August 25*; 7:30 p.m., ACCNX	No. 4	Jacksonville	W 3–1	1–0–0	Koskinen Stadium (1,023); Durham, NC
August 27*; 2:30 p.m., ACCNX	No. 4	Furman	W 6–0	2–0–0	Koskinen Stadium (1,129); Durham, NC
August 31*; 7:00 p.m., ACCNX	No. 3	Wofford	T 2–2	2–0–1	Koskinen Stadium (645); Durham, NC
September 4*; 4:00 p.m., ESPN+	No. 3	at Princeton	W 2–0	3–0–1	Roberts Stadium (1,200); Princeton, NJ
September 8; 7:00 p.m., ACCNX	No. 10	Virginia	W 2–0	4–0–1 (1–0–0)	Koskinen Stadium (1,569); Durham, NC
September 15; 7:30 p.m., ACCNX	No. 8	at Clemson	L 0–2	4–1–1 (1–1–0)	Riggs Field (2,953); Clemson, SC
September 24; 4:00 p.m., ACCNX	No. 11	at North Carolina; Rivalry	L 1–2	4–2–1 (1–2–0)	Dorrance Field (2,858); Chapel Hill, NC
September 26*; 7:00 p.m., ACCNX	No. 21	Charleston	W 3–2	5–2–1	Koskinen Stadium (418); Durham, NC
September 29; 7:00 p.m., ACCN	No. 21	No. 7 Syracuse	W 5–3	6–2–1 (2–2–0)	Koskinen Stadium (1,524); Durham, NC
October 7; 7:00 p.m., ACCNX	No. 14	at No. 11 Notre Dame	L 0–1	6–3–1 (2–3–0)	Alumni Stadium (1,451); Notre Dame, IN
October 10*; 7:00 p.m., ACCNX	No. 15	Elon	W 3–0	7–3–1	Koskinen Stadium (559); Durham, NC
October 13; 8:00 p.m., ACCN	No. 15	NC STate	W 2–1	8–3–1 (3–3–0)	Koskinen Stadium (1,457); Durham, NC
October 21; 7:00 p.m., ACCNX	No. 9	at No. 23 Pittsburgh	T 0–0	8–3–2 (3–3–1)	Koskinen Stadium (1,180); Durham, NC
October 24*; 7:00 p.m., ACCNX	No. 8	Howard	W 7–0	9–3–2	Koskinen Stadium (523); Durham, NC
October 27; 7:00 p.m., ACCNX	No. 8	Virginia Tech	W 7–1	10–3–2 (4–3–1)	Koskinen Stadium (1,367); Durham, NC
ACC Tournament
November 1; 6:00 p.m., ACCN	(5) No. 8	(12) Boston College; First Round	W 3–2	11–3–2	Koskinen Stadium (435); Durham, NC
November 5; 6:00 p.m., ACCN	(5) No. 8	(4) No. 14 Clemson; Quarterfinals	T 3–3 (1–4 PKs)	11–3–3	Riggs Field (435); Clemson, SC
NCAA Tournament
November 19; 1:00 p.m., ESPN+	(15) No. 8	No. 16 Western Michigan; Second Round	L 1–2	11–4–3	Koskinen Stadium (1,213); Durham, NC
*Non-conference game. ^{#}Rankings from United Soccer Coaches. (#) Tournament seedings in parentheses. All times are in Eastern.

== Awards and honors ==
Recipient	Award	Date	Ref.
Nick Pariano	Pre-Season All-ACC Team	August 26, 2023	
Forster Ajago	ACC Co-Offensive Player of the Week	August 29	
Julian Eyestone	ACC Defensive Player of the Week	September 12	
Nick Pariano	ACC Offensive Player of the Week	October 3	
Forster Ajago	ACC Co-Offensive Player of the Week	October 17	
Forster Ajago	ACC Offensive Player of the Year	November 8, 2023	
Forster Ajago	All-ACC First Team	November 8, 2023	
Nick Pariano	All-ACC First Team	November 8, 2023	
Ulfur Bjornsson	All-ACC Second Team	November 8, 2023	
Amir Daley	All-ACC Second Team	November 8, 2023	
Julian Eyestone	All-ACC Second Team	November 8, 2023	
Antino Lopez	All-ACC Third Team	November 8, 2023	
Ulfur Bjornsson	All-ACC Freshman Team	November 8, 2023	
Julian Eyestone	All-ACC Freshman Team	November 8, 2023	

== 2024 MLS Super Draft ==
Player	Team	Round	Pick #	Position
(Trinidad and Tobago) Wayne Frederick	Colorado Rapids	1	2	MF
(United States) Antino Lopez	Seattle Sounders FC	2	52	DF
(United States) Ruben Mesalles	Real Salt Lake	3	84	DF

== Rankings ==
Ranking movements Legend: ██ Increase in ranking ██ Decrease in ranking ( ) = First-place votes
	Week																
Poll	Pre	1	2	3	4	5	6	7	8	9	10	11	12	13	14	15	Final
United Soccer	4 (1)	3	10	8	11	21	14	15	9	8	8	8	Not released				20
TopDrawer Soccer	5	4	8	3	12	21	12	13	8	8	7	8	11	19	19	19	19
