= 2023 Louisville Cardinals men's soccer team =

American college soccer season

2023 Louisville Cardinals men's soccer

NCAA Tournament, Second Round
- Conference: Atlantic Coast Conference
- Record: 12–6–3 (2–4–2 ACC)
- Head coach: John Michael Hayden (5th season)
- Assistant coaches: Sean Teepen (2nd season); Stephen Lunney (1st season)
- Home stadium: Lynn Stadium

2023 ACC men's soccer standings
	Conf.					Overall
Team	W		L		T	W		L		T
Atlantic
No. 15 Wake Forest +	4	–	1	–	3	11	–	3	–	5
No. 1 Clemson ‡	4	–	2	–	2	15	–	3	–	5
No. 25 Syracuse +	2	–	1	–	5	9	–	5	–	7
No. 24 Louisville +	2	–	4	–	2	12	–	6	–	3
NC State	1	–	5	–	2	6	–	9	–	3
Boston College	0	–	5	–	3	3	–	9	–	5
Coastal
No. 2 Notre Dame +	6	–	0	–	2	13	–	3	–	6
No. 13 Virginia +	5	–	2	–	1	11	–	4	–	4
No. 20 Duke+	4	–	3	–	1	11	–	4	–	3
No. 6 North Carolina +	2	–	3	–	3	11	–	3	–	7
Pittsburgh +	2	–	3	–	3	6	–	7	–	4
Virginia Tech	2	–	5	–	1	4	–	9	–	4
‡ – ACC tournament champion + – Also invited to the 2023 NCAA tournament; As of December 12, 2023; Rankings from United Soccer Coaches; Source: The ACC

The 2023 Louisville Cardinals men's soccer team represented the University of Louisville during the 2023 NCAA Division I men's soccer season. The Cardinals were led by head coach John Michael Hayden, in his fifth season. They played their home games at Lynn Stadium. This was the team's 45th season playing organized men's college soccer and their 10th playing in the Atlantic Coast Conference.

The Cardinals finished the season 12–6–3 overall and 2–4–2 in ACC play to finish in fourth place in the Atlantic Division. As the ninth overall seed in the ACC Tournament they defeated eighth seed Pittsburgh in overtime in the First Round and upset first seed Notre Dame in the Quarterfinals. They were defeated by eventual tournament champions Clemson in the Semifinals. They received an at-large bid to the NCAA Tournament where they defeated Dayton in the First Round before losing to West Virginia in the Second Round to end their season.

== Background ==
The Cardinals finished the season 9–6–3 overall and 4–3–1 in ACC play to finish in third place in the Atlantic Division. As the fifth overall seed in the ACC Tournament they were upset by twelfth seed Virginia Tech in the First Round. They received an at-large bid to the NCAA Tournament where they lost in the First Round to Western Michigan to end their season.

== Player movement ==
=== Players leaving ===
Departures
Name	Number	Pos.	Height	Weight	Year	Hometown	Reason for departure
Dante Huckaby	2	DF	6'1"	172	Sophomore	Morgantown, West Virginia	Transferred to West Virginia
Matty Walters	5	DF	5'8"	144	Senior	Marysville, Ohio	Graduated
Rafael Pinzón	6	MF	5'7"	146	Junior	Mexico City, Mexico	Transferred to Stetson
Aboubacar Camara	9	FW	5'8"	170	Junior	Upper Darby, Pennsylvania	Transferred to Kentucky
Ugochukwu Achara	10	FW	6'1"	172	Senior	Enugu, Nigeria	Transferred to Northwestern
Macoumba Ba	11	FW	5'8"	148	Junior	Dakar, Senegal	Transferred to St. John's
Eric Danquah	14	MF	5'6"	135	Junior	Accra, Ghana	Transferred to St. John's
Nico Diaz	17	FW	5'10"	161	Junior	New Smyrna Beach, Florida	—
Marcus Jorgensen	18	DF	6'2"	185	Freshman	Viborg, Denmark	Transferred to Cal Poly Pomona
Patrick Ajdukiewicz	19	MF	5'8"	158	Sophomore	Barrington, Illinois	—

=== Players arriving ===
==== Incoming transfers ====
Departures
Name	Number	Pos.	Height	Weight	Year	Hometown	Previous school
Gaetano D'Argento	2	DF	5'10"	163	Junior	Wayne, Illinois	Bowling Green
Mason Tatafu	5	DF	6'2"	185	Junior	Perth, Australia	Hofstra
Gage Guerra	9	FW	5'10"	180	Junior	Houston, Texas	Army
Xavi Wences	14	MF	5'10"	160	Junior	Mexico City, Mexico	USC Upstate

==== Recruiting class ====
Name	Nat.	Hometown	Club	TDS Rating
Elijah Brijbasi; MF	USA	Baltimore, Maryland	Pipeline SC	3/5 stars
Ethan Subachan; FW	USA	Cooper City, Florida	Orlando City SC Academy	4/5 stars
Chase Vazquez; FW	USA	Boca Raton, Florida	Orlando City SC Academy	4/5 stars

== Squad ==
=== Roster ===
As of January 23, 2024

Note: Flags indicate national team as defined under FIFA eligibility rules; some limited exceptions apply. Players may hold more than one non-FIFA nationality.

No.	Pos.	Nation	Player
1	GK	USA	Gavin Krenecki
2	DF	USA	Gaetano D'Argento
3	DF	USA	Ryan Nichols
4	DF	USA	Bryce Lebel
5	DF	AUS	Mason Tatafu
6	MF	USA	RC Schmeider
7	FW	USA	Brandon McManus
8	MF	USA	David Boccuzzo
9	FW	USA	Gage Guerra
10	FW	CYP	Konstantinos Georgallides
11	FW	USA	Damien Barker John
12	MF	NOR	Filip Fredhall
13	MF	USA	Bradley Sample
14	MF	MEX	Xavi Wences

No.	Pos.	Nation	Player
16	DF	USA	Josh Jones
17	MF	USA	Elijah Brijbasi
18	DF	USA	Ethan Subachan
20	DF	USA	Parker Forbes
21	MF	USA	Ayden Nocus
22	DF	USA	Axel Alejandre
23	MF	USA	Quinton Elliot
24	FW	USA	Chase Vazquez
26	MF	USA	Sammy Murphy
29	GK	USA	Alex Svetanoff
30	GK	USA	Ryan Troutman
31	GK	USA	Liam Fitzgerald
46	MF	NOR	Sander Roed

=== Team management ===
Position	Staff
Head coach	John Michael Hayden
Assistant Coach	Sean Teepen
Assistant Coach	Stephen Lunney
Volunteer assistant coach	Darren Yeagle
Director of Operations	James Kusak

== Schedule ==
Date Time, TV	Rank^{#}	Opponent^{#}	Result	Record	Site (Attendance) City, State
Regular Season
August 24*; 7:30 p.m., ACCNX		No. 16 Tulsa	W 1–0	1–0–0	Lynn Stadium (687); Louisville, KY
August 28*; 7:30 p.m., ACCNX		Bellarmine	W 3–0	2–0–0	Lynn Stadium (887); Louisville, KY
September 1*; 7:00 p.m., ESPN+	No. 12	at UNC Greensboro	W 2–0	3–0–0	UNCG Soccer Stadium (1,221); Greensboro, NC
September 5*; 8:00 p.m., ACCN	No. 7	No. 19 Kentucky; Rivalry	W 4–2	4–0–0	Lynn Stadium (2,350); Louisville, KY
September 8; 8:00 p.m., ACCN	No. 7	at No. 4 Syracuse	T 2–2	4–0–1 (0–0–1)	SU Soccer Stadium (1,832); Syracuse, NY
September 15; 8:00 p.m., ACCN	No. 5т	Virginia Tech	L 1–2	4–1–1 (0–1–1)	Lynn Stadium (1,071); Louisville, KY
September 19*; 7:00 p.m., ESPN+	No. 10	at Evansville	W 2–0	5–1–1	McCutchan Stadium (831); Evansville, IN
September 24; 7:00 p.m., ACCNX	No. 10	NC State	W 5–2	6–1–1 (1–1–1)	Lynn Stadium; Louisville, KY
September 29; 7:00 p.m., ACCNX	No. 8	at Virginia	L 0–3	6–2–1 (1–2–1)	Klöckner Stadium (1,400); Charlottesville, VA
October 2; 7:00 p.m., ACCNX	No. 8	Kansas City	W 3–2	7–2–1	Lynn Stadium (812); Louisville, KY
October 6; 7:00 p.m., ACCNX	No. 21	at Clemson	L 0–4	7–3–1 (1–3–1)	Riggs Field (2,575); Clemson, SC
October 10*; 7:00 p.m., ACCNX		Ohio State	T 2–2	7–3–2	Lynn Stadium (587); Louisville, KY
October 13; 7:00 p.m., ACCNX		Boston College	W 1–0	8–3–2 (2–3–1)	Lynn Stadium (822); Louisville, KY
October 17*; 7:00 p.m., ESPN+		at Oakland	W 4–0	9–3–2	Oakland Soccer Field (100); Rochester, MI
October 22; 5:00 p.m., ACCNX		at No. 11 North Carolina	L 0–2	9–4–2 (2–4–1)	Dorrance Field (3,887); Chapel Hill, NC
October 27; 7:00 p.m., ACCNX		No. 3 Wake Forest	T 2–2	9–4–3 (2–4–2)	Lynn Stadium (1,052); Louisville, KY
ACC tournament
November 1; 8:00 p.m., ACCN	(9)	at (8) Pittsburgh; First Round	W 2–1 ^{2OT}	10–4–3	Ambrose Urbanic Field (717); Pittsburgh, PA
November 5; 8:00 p.m., ACCN	(9)	at (1) No. 2 Notre Dame; Quarterfinals	W 4–3	11–4–3	Alumni Stadium (794); Notre Dame, IN
November 8; 8:00 p.m., ACCN	(9) No. 20	at (4) No. 14 Clemson; Semifinals	L 1–5	11–5–3	Riggs Field (3,785); Clemson, SC
NCAA tournament
November 16; 7:00 p.m., ESPN+		Dayton; First Round	W 4–3	12–5–3	Lynn Stadium (877); Louisville, KY
November 19; 2:00 p.m., ESPN+		at (5) No. 5 West Virginia; Second Round	L 0–1	12–6–3	Dick Dlesk Soccer Stadium (3,137); Morgantown, WV
*Non-conference game. ^{#}Rankings from United Soccer Coaches. (#) Tournament seedings in parentheses. All times are in Eastern.

== Awards and honors ==
Recipient	Award	Date	Ref.
Gage Guerra	Pre-Season Hermann Trophy Watchlist	August 24	
Sander Roed	Pre-Season All-ACC Team	August 26	
Alex Svetanoff	ACC Defensive Player of the Week	August 29	
Gage Guerra	ACC Offensive Player of the Week	September 5	
Gage Guerra	ACC Offensive Player of the Week	September 12	
Damien Barker-John	ACC Co-Offensive Player of the Week	September 26	
Sander Roed	All-ACC Second Team	November 8	
Damien Barker-John	All-ACC Second Team	November 8	
Josh Jones	All-ACC Third Team	November 8	
Alex Svetanoff	ACC All-Tournament Team	November 12, 2023	
Sander Roed	ACC All-Tournament Team	November 12, 2023	

== 2024 MLS Super Draft ==
Player	Team	Round	Pick #	Position
(United States) Damien Barker-John	Real Salt Lake	2	37	FW
(United States) Josh Jones	Real Salt Lake	2	47	DF
(United States) Gage Guerra	Portland Timbers	3	69	FW

== Rankings ==
Ranking movements Legend: ██ Increase in ranking ██ Decrease in ranking — = Not ranked RV = Received votes т = Tied with team above or below
	Week																
Poll	Pre	1	2	3	4	5	6	7	8	9	10	11	12	13	14	15	Final
United Soccer	RV	12	7	5т	10	8	21	—	—	—	—	20	Not released				24
TopDrawer Soccer	—	—	19	7	19	13	23	—	—	—	—	20	24	—	—	—	—
