= 2023 ACC men's soccer tournament =

Soccer tournament

- Classification: Division I
- Teams: 12
- Matches: 11
- Attendance: 17,735
- Site: Campus Sites; WakeMed Soccer Park; Cary, North Carolina
- Champions: Clemson (5th title)
- Winning coach: Mike Noonan (3rd title)
- MVP: Ousmane Sylla (Clemson)
- Broadcast: ESPNU (Final), ACC Network

2023 ACC men's soccer standings
| | Conf. | | | | | Overall |
| Team | W | | L | | T | W | | L | | T |
|---|---|---|---|---|---|---|---|---|---|---|
Atlantic
| No. 15 Wake Forest + | 4 | – | 1 | – | 3 | 11 | – | 3 | – | 5 |
| No. 1 Clemson ‡ | 4 | – | 2 | – | 2 | 15 | – | 3 | – | 5 |
| No. 25 Syracuse + | 2 | – | 1 | – | 5 | 9 | – | 5 | – | 7 |
| No. 24 Louisville + | 2 | – | 4 | – | 2 | 12 | – | 6 | – | 3 |
| NC State | 1 | – | 5 | – | 2 | 6 | – | 9 | – | 3 |
| Boston College | 0 | – | 5 | – | 3 | 3 | – | 9 | – | 5 |
Coastal
| No. 2 Notre Dame + | 6 | – | 0 | – | 2 | 13 | – | 3 | – | 6 |
| No. 13 Virginia + | 5 | – | 2 | – | 1 | 11 | – | 4 | – | 4 |
| No. 20 Duke+ | 4 | – | 3 | – | 1 | 11 | – | 4 | – | 3 |
| No. 6 North Carolina + | 2 | – | 3 | – | 3 | 11 | – | 3 | – | 7 |
| Pittsburgh + | 2 | – | 3 | – | 3 | 6 | – | 7 | – | 4 |
| Virginia Tech | 2 | – | 5 | – | 1 | 4 | – | 9 | – | 4 |
‡ – ACC tournament champion + – Also invited to the 2023 NCAA tournament; As of December 12, 2023; Rankings from United Soccer Coaches; Source: The ACC

The 2023 ACC men's soccer tournament was the 37th edition of the ACC men's soccer tournament. The tournament decided the Atlantic Coast Conference champion and guaranteed representative into the 2023 NCAA Division I men's soccer tournament. The final was played at WakeMed Soccer Park in Cary, North Carolina.

Syracuse are the defending tournament champions.

Syracuse was unable to defend their title as they fell to North Carolina in the Semifinals. Three of the top four seeds lost in the Quarterfinals, with fourth seed Clemson being the only top four seed to win. Clemson would go on to win the title, defeating North Carolina in the Final on penalties. The title was Clemson's fifth overall and second in four years. It was head coach Mike Noonan's third title as coach.

== Qualification ==
All twelve teams in the Atlantic Coast Conference earned a berth into the ACC Tournament. The winners of each division, Atlantic and Coastal, were seeds 1 and 2. The top 4 seeds received first round byes and hosted the winner of a first-round game. The remaining 10 teams in the conference were seeded according to points awarded in conference matches. All rounds, with the exception of the final were held at the higher seed's home field. Seeding is determined by regular season conference record. The seeding for the tournament was determined on the final day of conference play, October 27. A tiebreaker was required between North Carolina and Pittsburgh for the seventh and eighth seeds as both teams finished with 2–3–3 conference records. The regular season meeting between the two teams finished in a 0–0 tie, so the next tiebreaker of goal differential in conference games was used. North Carolina had a 0 goal differential, while Pittsburgh had a -4 goal differential. Therefore, North Carolina was the seventh seed, and Pittsburgh was the eighth seed.

| Seed | School | Conference Record | Points |
|---|---|---|---|
| 1 | Notre Dame | 6–0–2 | 20 |
| 2 | Wake Forest* | 4–1–3 | 15* |
| 3 | Virginia* | 5–2–1 | 16* |
| 4 | Clemson | 4–2–2 | 14 |
| 5 | Duke | 4–3–1 | 13 |
| 6 | Syracuse | 2–1–5 | 11 |
| 7 | North Carolina | 2–3–3 | 9 |
| 8 | Pittsburgh | 2–3–3 | 9 |
| 9 | Louisville | 2–4–2 | 8 |
| 10 | Virginia Tech | 2–5–1 | 7 |
| 11 | NC State | 1–5–2 | 5 |
| 12 | Boston College | 0–5–3 | 3 |

(*: division winners are automatically given the top two seeds).

== Bracket ==
*Note: Home team listed first. Rankings shown are ACC Tournament Seeds.

First Round; November 1 ACCN & ACCNX
8 | Pittsburgh | 1
9 | Louisville (a.e.t.) | 2
5 | Duke | 3
12 | Boston College | 2
6 | Syracuse | 5
11 | NC State | 0
7 | North Carolina | 4
10 | Virginia Tech | 1

Quarterfinals; November 5 ACCN
1 | Notre Dame | 3
9 | Louisville | 4
4 | Clemson (pen.) | 3 (4)
5 | Duke | 3 (1)
3 | Virginia | 2 (3)
6 | Syracuse (pen.) | 2 (4)
2 | Wake Forest | 0
7 | North Carolina | 1

Semifinals; November 8 ACCN
9 | Louisville | 1
4 | Clemson | 5
6 | Syracuse | 1
7 | North Carolina | 3

Final; November 12; ESPNU
4 | Clemson (pen.) | 1 (5)
7 | North Carolina | 1 (3)

== Matches ==
=== First round ===
| November 1, 2023 | #6 Syracuse | 5–0 | #11 NC State | Syracuse, NY |
| 6:00 p.m. EDT | Gabriel Mikina 25'; Mateo Leveque (yellow card) 26'; Daniel Diaz Bonilla 40', 80'; Felipe D'Agostini 71'; Jackson Glenn 73' | Box Score | (yellow card) 39' Drew Lovelace | Stadium: SU Soccer Stadium; Referee: Matthew Thompson; Assistant referees: Democratis Pashalidis; Benjamin Eisenhunt; Fourth official: Stephanie Serrano |

| November 1, 2023 | #5 Duke | 3–2 | #12 Boston College | Durham, NC |
| 6:00 p.m. EDT | Antino Lopez 3'; Ulfur Bjornsson 62'; Ruben Mesalles 63'; Bull Jorgensen (yellow card) 84' | Box Score | (yellow card) 34' CJ Williams; (yellow card) 45' Xavier O'Neil; (yellow card) 65' Team; 80' Daniel Klaric; 81' Christian Bejar | Stadium: Koskinen Stadium; Attendance: 435; Referee: Daniel Radford; Assistant referees: Daniel Kappler; Jude Carr; Fourth official: Mark Deblois |

| November 1, 2023 | #7 North Carolina | 4–1 | #10 Virginia Tech | Chapel Hill, NC |
| 6:00 p.m. EDT | Quenzi Huerman 29'; Ernest Bawa 44', 76'; Charlie Harper 68' | Box Score | 2' Misei Yoshizawa; (yellow card) 31' Mayola Kinyua | Stadium: Dorrance Field; Attendance: 991; Referee: Christopher Grabas; Assistant referees: Dallas Rosier; Michael Donovan; Fourth official: Hudson Owens |

| November 1, 2023 | #8 Pittsburgh | 1–2 (a.e.t.) | #9 Louisville | Pittsburgh, PA |
| 8:00 p.m. EDT | Felipe Mercado (yellow card) 24'; Mateo Maillefaud (yellow card) 42'; Joao Souza 106', (yellow card) 106'; Eben McIntyre (yellow card) 106' | Box Score | (yellow card) 95' Bryce LeBel; 104', (red card) 106' Mason Tatafu; 105' Damien Barker John; (yellow card) 106' Team; (yellow card) 107' David Boccuzzo; (yellow card) 107' Gaetano D'Argento | Stadium: Ambrose Urbanic Field; Attendance: 717; Referee: Nikola Aleksic; Assistant referees: Kerven Moon; John Safar; Fourth official: Jason Caruso |

=== Quarterfinals ===
| November 5, 2023 | #3 Virginia | 1–1 (a.e.t.) (3–4 p) | #6 Syracuse | Charlottesville, VA |
| 2:00 p.m. EST | Leo Afonso (yellow card) 50', (goal) 51'; Joey Batrouni (yellow card) 110' | Box Score | (yellow card) 28' Noah Singelmann; (yellow card) 51' Nicholas Kaloukian; 84' Mateo Leveque; (yellow card) 110' Gabriel Mikina | Stadium: Klöckner Stadium; Attendance: 2,106; Referee: Karl Kummer; Assistant referees: Anthony Wolford; Robert Velbis; Fourth official: Hicham El Bariqi |
| | Penalties |
| | Leo Afonso (penalty scored); Axel Ahlander (penalty scored); Aidan O'Connor (penalty missed); Daniel Mangarov (penalty scored); Mouhameth Thiam (penalty missed) | | (penalty missed) Lorenzo Boselli; (penalty scored) Joshua Belluz; (penalty scored) Jeorgio Kocevski; (penalty scored) Noah Singlemann; (penalty scored) Daniel Bonilla |

| November 5, 2023 | #2 Wake Forest | 0–1 | #7 North Carolina | Winston-Salem, NC |
| 4:00 p.m. EST | Prince Amponsah (yellow card) 59'; Garrison Tubbs (yellow card) 82' | Box Score | 16' Ahmad Al-Qaq; (yellow card) 59' Quenzi Huerman | Stadium: Spry Stadium; Attendance: 2,958; Referee: John McCloskey; Assistant referees: Jude Carr; Kevin Uitto; Fourth official: Kevin Maurer |

| November 5, 2023 | #4 Clemson | 3–3 (a.e.t.) (4–1 p) | #5 Duke | Clemson, SC |
| 6:00 p.m. EST | Tyler Trimnal 11', 75'; Shawn Smart (yellow card) 27'; Pape Mar Boye (yellow card) 57'; Adam Lundegard (yellow card) 65'; Alex Meinhard 94' (pen.) | Box Score | 36' Forster Ajago; 54' (o.g.) Clemson Own Goal; (yellow card) 59' Kenan Hot; (yellow card) 94' Amir Daley; 98', (yellow card) 106' Ulfur Bjornsson | Stadium: Riggs Field; Attendance: 2,061; Referee: David Erbacher; Assistant referees: Rick Rogers; Chris Zuerner; Fourth official: Ralph Polson |
| | Penalties |
| | Ousmane Sylla (penalty scored); Joran Gerbet (penalty scored); Gael Gibert (penalty scored); Jackson Wrobel (penalty scored) | | (penalty scored) Nick Pariano; (penalty missed) Ulfur Bjornsson; (penalty missed) Forster Ajago |

| November 5, 2023 | #1 Notre Dame | 3–4 | #9 Louisville | Notre Dame, IN |
| 8:00 p.m. EST | Kyle Genenbacher 66'; Bryce Boneau 69', 88' | Box Score | (yellow card) 22' Parker Forbes; 23', 48', 52', (yellow card) 51' Sander Roed; (yellow card) 23' Axel Alejandre; (yellow card) 41' Ethan Subachan; (yellow card) 57' Bradley Sample; (yellow card) 71' Brandon McManus; 89' Josh Jones | Stadium: Alumni Stadium; Attendance: 794; Referee: JC Griggs; Assistant referees: Steve Besk; Carlos Leyva; Fourth official: Tony DeLois |

=== Semifinals ===
| November 8, 2023 | #6 Syracuse | 1–3 | #7 North Carolina | Syracuse, NY |
| 6:00 p.m. EST | Gabriel Mikina (yellow card) 42'; Noah Singelmann (yellow card) 45'; Nicholas Kaloukian 56'; Jeorgio Kocevski (red card) 58' | Report | Martin Vician 7', 70'; Sam Williams (yellow card) 9'; Matt Edwards (yellow card) 22'; Daniel Kutsch 37'; Ahmad Al-Qaq (yellow card) 73' | Stadium: SU Soccer Stadium; Attendance: 1,570; Referee: Stephen Foster; Assistant referees: Christopher Borncamp; Benjamin Eisenhut; Fourth official: Matthew Altman |

| November 8, 2023 | #4 Clemson | 5–1 | #9 Louisville | Clemson, SC |
| 8:00 p.m. EST | Remi Okunlola 7'; Tyler Trimnal (yellow card) 25'; Ousmane Sylla 31', 36'; Isaiah Easley 68'; Gael Gibert 71'; Will Cain (yellow card) 86' | Report | Gage Guerra 19'; Parker Forbes (yellow card) 24'; Brandon McManus (yellow card) 76'; Bryce LeBel (yellow card) 90'; Josh Jones (yellow card) 90' | Stadium: Riggs Field; Attendance: 3,785; Referee: Mike Stutt; Assistant referees: Jarred Mosher; Kevin Huet; Fourth official: Brandon Marion |

=== Final ===
| November 12, 2023 | #4 Clemson | 1–1 (a.e.t.) (5–3 p) | #7 North Carolina | Cary, NC |
| 12:00 p.m. EST | Adam Lundegard (yellow card) 66'; Joran Gerbet (yellow card) 66'; Ousmane Sylla 82' | Box Score | 48', (yellow card) 82' Quenzi Huerman; (yellow card) 76' Til Zinnhardt | Stadium: WakeMed Soccer Park; Attendance: 2,318; Referee: Dimitar Chavdarov; Assistant referees: Ankur Singh; Justin Howard; Fourth official: Michael Lavergne |
| | Penalties |
| | Brandon Parrish (penalty scored); Ousmane Sylla (penalty scored); Joran Gerbet (penalty scored); Gael Gibert (penalty scored); Alex Meinhard (penalty scored) | | (penalty scored) Sam Williams; (penalty scored) Quenzi Huerman; (penalty missed) Matt Edwards; (penalty scored) Martin Vician |

== Statistics ==
=== Goalscorers ===
There were 46 goals scored in 11 matches, for an average of 4.18 goals per match.

3 goals

- (Senegal) Ousmane Sylla – Clemson
- (Norway) Sander Roed – Louisville

2 goals

- (United States) Tyler Trimnal – Clemson
- (Iceland) Ulfur Bjornsson – Duke
- (Ghana) Ernest Bawa – North Carolina
- (France) Quenzi Huerman – North Carolina
- (Slovakia) Martin Vician – North Carolina
- (United States) Bryce Boneau – Notre Dame
- (United States) Daniel Diaz Bonilla – Syracuse

1 goal

- (Croatia) Christian Bejar – Boston College
- (United States) Daniel Klaric – Boston College
- (United States) Isaiah Easley – Clemson
- (France) Gael Gibert – Clemson
- (United States) Alex Meinhard – Clemson
- (United States) Remi Okunlola – Clemson
- (Ghana) Forster Ajago – Duke
- (United States) Antino Lopez – Duke
- (United States) Ruben Mesalles – Duke
- (United States) Gage Guerra – Louisville
- (United States) Damien Barker John – Louisville
- (United States) Josh Jones – Louisville
- (Australia) Mason Tatafu – Louisville
- (United States) Ahmad Al-Qaq – North Carolina
- (Australia) Charlie Harper – North Carolina
- (United States) Daniel Kutsch – North Carolina
- (United States) Kyle Genenbacher – Notre Dame
- (Brazil) Joao Souza – Pittsburgh
- (Brazil) Felipe D'Agostini – Syracuse
- (United States) Jackson Glenn – Syracuse
- (United States) Nicholas Kaloukian – Syracuse
- (France) Mateo Leveque – Syracuse
- (Canada) Gabriel Mikina – Syracuse
- (Brazil) Leo Afonso – Virginia
- (Japan) Misei Yoshizawa – Virginia Tech

1 own goal

- Clemson (vs Duke)

== All-Tournament team ==
| Player | Team |
|---|---|
**2023 ACC Men's Soccer All-Tournament team**
| **Ousmane Sylla** | Clemson |
| Gael Gerbet | Clemson |
| Joran Gerbet | Clemson |
| Alex Meinhard | Clemson |
| Quenzi Huerman | North Carolina |
| Martin Vician | North Carolina |
| Til Zinnhardt | North Carolina |
| Sander Roed | Louisville |
| Alex Svetanoff | Louisville |
| Daniel Diaz Bonilla | Syracuse |
| Buster Sjoberg | Syracuse |

MVP in Bold
