= 2023 Virginia Cavaliers men's soccer team =

American college soccer season

2023 Virginia Cavaliers men's soccer

NCAA Tournament, Third Round
- Conference: Atlantic Coast Conference
- Record: 11–4–4 (5–2–1 ACC)
- Head coach: George Gelnovatch (28th season)
- Assistant coaches: Matt Chulis (17th season); Adam Perron (4th season); Jermaine Birriel (1st season)
- Home stadium: Klöckner Stadium

2023 ACC men's soccer standings
	Conf.					Overall
Team	W		L		T	W		L		T
Atlantic
No. 15 Wake Forest +	4	–	1	–	3	11	–	3	–	5
No. 1 Clemson ‡	4	–	2	–	2	15	–	3	–	5
No. 25 Syracuse +	2	–	1	–	5	9	–	5	–	7
No. 24 Louisville +	2	–	4	–	2	12	–	6	–	3
NC State	1	–	5	–	2	6	–	9	–	3
Boston College	0	–	5	–	3	3	–	9	–	5
Coastal
No. 2 Notre Dame +	6	–	0	–	2	13	–	3	–	6
No. 13 Virginia +	5	–	2	–	1	11	–	4	–	4
No. 20 Duke+	4	–	3	–	1	11	–	4	–	3
No. 6 North Carolina +	2	–	3	–	3	11	–	3	–	7
Pittsburgh +	2	–	3	–	3	6	–	7	–	4
Virginia Tech	2	–	5	–	1	4	–	9	–	4
‡ – ACC tournament champion + – Also invited to the 2023 NCAA tournament; As of December 12, 2023; Rankings from United Soccer Coaches; Source: The ACC

The 2023 Virginia Cavaliers men's soccer team represented the University of Virginia during the 2023 NCAA Division I men's soccer season. The Cavaliers were led by head coach George Gelnovatch, in his twenty-eighth season. They played their home games at Klöckner Stadium in Charlottesville, Virginia. This was the team's 83rd season playing organized men's college soccer and their 72nd playing in the Atlantic Coast Conference.

The Cavaliers finished the season 11–4–4 overall and 5–2–1 in ACC play to finish in second place in the Coastal Division. As the third overall seed in the ACC Tournament they earned a bye to the Quarterfinals where they were defeated by sixth seed Syracuse in penalties. They received an at-large bid to the NCAA Tournament and they were the seventh overall seed. They defeated FIU in the Second Round before losing 1–0 to Indiana in the Third Round to end their season.

== Background ==
The Cavaliers finished the season 10–4–5 overall and 5–1–2 in ACC play to finish in second place in the Coastal Division. As the third overall seed in the ACC Tournament they defeated sixth seed Pittsburgh in the Quarterfinals before losing to eventual champions Syracuse on penalties in the Semifinals. They received an at-large bid to the NCAA Tournament where they lost in the First Round to Western Michigan to end their season.

== Player movement ==
=== Players leaving ===
Departures
Name	Number	Pos.	Height	Weight	Year	Hometown	Reason for Departure
Isaiah Byrd	3	MF	6'0"	175	Junior	Gainesville, Virginia	Transferred to Virginia Tech
Jeremy Verley	6	MF	5'11"	165	Senior	Kingston, Jamaica	Graduated
Erick Kilosho	8	MF	5'8"	165	Sophomore	Roanoke, Virginia	Transferred to George Mason
Philip Horton	9	FW	6'0"	185	Junior	New Albany, Ohio	Signed Professional Contract with FC Cincinnati 2
Asparuh Slavov	10	MF	6'0"	175	Sophomore	Alpharetta, Georgia	Transferred to George Mason
Kevin Ogudugu	11	FW/MF	5'9"	170	Junior	Oslo, Norway	Transferred to Northeastern
Moritz Kappelsberger	13	DF	6'3"	207	Graduate Student	Rosenheim, Germany	Graduated
Andreas Ueland	17	DF	6'5"	190	Senior	Bryne, Norway	Graduated; selected 68th overall in 2023 MLS SuperDraft
Cabrel Happi Kamseu	20	FW	6'3"	185	Graduate Student	Harare, Zimbabwe	Graduated
Nils Henry Orywol	21	MF/DF	5'10"	160	Sophomore	Frankfurt, Germany	Transferred to Tulsa
Andy Sullins	25	FW	6'2"	180	Freshman	Athens, Tennessee	Transferred to Virginia Tech
Owen Walz	27	MF	5'6"	150	Freshman	Arlington, Virginia	Transferred to University of San Diego
Henry van Wincoop	28	FW	5'10"	170	Sophomore	Charlottesville, Virginia	—
Truman Glenovatch	35	FW	5'10"	185	Graduate Student	Miami, Florida	Graduated

=== Players arriving ===
==== Incoming transfers ====
Departures
Name	Number	Pos.	Height	Weight	Year	Hometown	Previous School
Joey Batrouni	0	GK	6'1"	178	Junior	San Antonio, Texas	Coastal Carolina
Mouhameth Thiam	11	MF	5'5"	142	Senior	Dakar, Senegal	Oregon State
Elias Norris	21	FW	5'10"	155	Graduate Student	Bethesda, Maryland	George Washington
Garrett Socas	24	MF	6'2"	172	Graduate Student	McLean, Virginia	Dartmouth
Jack Singer	27	MF	6'1"	175	Graduate Student	San Francisco, California	California
Austin Rome	33	DF	6'3"	185	(redshirt) Junior	Bowie, Maryland	Providence

==== Recruiting class ====
Name	Nat.	Hometown	Club	TDS Rating
Ignacio Alem; FW	USA	Potomac, Maryland	D.C. United Academy	4/5 stars
Stephen Annor Gyamfi; FW	GHA	Accra, Ghana	SIMA	3/5 stars
Cesar Cordova; FW	USA	Houston, Texas	Houston Dynamo 2	4/5 stars
Brendan Lambe; MF	USA	Apex, North Carolina	Atlanta United 2	4/5 stars
Donovan Maryat; DF	USA	Brooklyn, New York	Met Oval	3/5 stars
John Talley; MF	USA	Memphis, Tennessee	Memphis 901 FC	3/5 stars
Matthew Thissell; MF	USA	Ashburn, Virginia	Bethesda Academy	4/5 stars
Caleb Tunks; GK	USA	Kailua-Kona, Hawaii	Solar SC	3/5 stars

== Squad ==
=== Roster ===
As of January 26, 2024

Note: Flags indicate national team as defined under FIFA eligibility rules; some limited exceptions apply. Players may hold more than one non-FIFA nationality.

No.	Pos.	Nation	Player
0	GK	USA	Joey Batrouni
00	GK	USA	Caleb Tunks
1	GK	USA	Scott Williams
2	DF	USA	William Citron
3	MF	USA	Max Talley
4	DF	GER	Paul Wiese
5	DF	USA	Aidan O'Connor
7	FW	BRA	Leo Afonso
8	MF	USA	Brendan Lambe
9	FW	GHA	Stephen Annor Gyamfi
10	MF	NOR	Axel Ahlander
11	MF	SEN	Mouhameth Thiam
12	MF	SWE	Albin Gashi
13	FW	USA	Cesar Cordova
15	FW	USA	Triton Beauvois
16	MF	USA	Daniel Mangarov
17	DF	CAN	Victor Akoum
18	FW	USA	Kome Ubogu

No.	Pos.	Nation	Player
19	DF	USA	Reese Miller
20	FW	USA	Ignacio Alem
21	MF	USA	Elias Norris
22	FW	USA	Michael Tsicoulias
23	FW	USA	David Okorie
24	MF	USA	Garrett Socas
25	DF	USA	Donovan Maryat
26	MF	USA	Amari Salley
27	MF	USA	Jack Singer
28	MF	USA	Matthew Thissell
29	DF	USA	Yassine Rhoumar
30	GK	USA	Colin Gallagher
31	MF	ITA	Umberto Pelà
32	FW	USA	Parker Sloan
33	DF	USA	Austin Rome
34	MF	USA	Miguel Kobby Adoboe
46	DF	USA	Matthew Hunter
99	GK	USA	Holden Brown

=== Team management ===
Position	Staff
Head coach	George Gelnovatch
Associate Head Coach	Matt Chulis
Associate Head Coach	Adam Perron
Assistant coach	Jermaine Birriel

== Schedule ==
Date Time, TV	Rank^{#}	Opponent^{#}	Result	Record	Site (Attendance) City, State
Regular Season
August 24*; 6:00 p.m., ACCNX	No. 15	Iona	W 1–0	1–0–0	Klöckner Stadium (1,980); Charlottesville, VA
August 27*; 7:00 p.m., ACCNX	No. 15	Loyola Marymount	L 1–3	1–1–0	Klöckner Stadium (1,445); Charlottesville, VA
August 31*; 8:00 p.m., ACCNX		George Mason	W 1–0	2–1–0	Klöckner Stadium (1,473); Charlottesville, VA
September 4*; 7:00 p.m., ACCNX		No. 20 Maryland; Rivalry	W 2–1	3–1–0	Klöckner Stadium (2,139); Charlottesville, VA
September 8; 7:00 p.m., ACCNX		at No. 10 Duke	L 0–2	3–2–0 (0–1–0)	Koskinen Stadium (1,569); Durham, NC
September 12*; 7:00 p.m., ESPN+		at No. 9 James Madison	T 1–1	3–2–1	Sentara Park (1,464); Harrisonburg, VA
September 16; 7:00 p.m., ACCNX		NC State	W 3–1	4–2–1 (1–1–0)	Klöckner Stadium (2,319); Charlottesville, VA
September 22; 8:00 p.m., ACCN		at No. 15 Notre Dame	L 1–3	4–3–1 (1–2–0)	Alumni Stadium (1,710); Notre Dame, IN
September 26*; 7:00 p.m., ACCNX		ETSU	W 1–0	5–3–1	Klöckner Stadium (1,400); Charlottesville, VA
September 29; 7:00 p.m., ACCNX		No. 8 Louisville	W 3–0	6–3–1 (2–2–0)	Klöckner Stadium (1,761); Charlottesville, VA
October 3*; 7:00 p.m., ACCNX		No. 16 Hofstra	T 1–1	6–3–2	Klöckner Stadium (1,092); Charlottesville, VA
October 6; 7:00 p.m., ACCNX		at Boston College	T 1–1	6–3–3 (2–2–1)	Newton Campus Soccer Field (712); Chestnut Hill, MA
October 13; 7:00 p.m., ACCNX		No. 11 Pittsburgh	W 2–1	7–3–3 (3–2–1)	Klöckner Stadium (2,551); Charlottesville, VA
October 20; 6:00 p.m., ACCNX		at Virginia Tech; Rivalry	W 3–0	8–3–3 (4–2–1)	Thompson Field (2,061); Blacksburg, VA
October 24*; 7:00 p.m., ACCNX	No. 14	High Point	W 3–1	9–3–3	Klöckner Stadium (1,094); Charlottesville, VA
October 27; 7:30 p.m., ACCN	No. 14	No. 10 North Carolina	W 1–0	10–3–3 (5–2–1)	Klöckner Stadium (2,487); Charlottesville, VA
ACC Tournament
November 5; 2:00 p.m., ACCN	(3) No. 9	(6) No. 22 Syracuse; Quarterfinals	T 1–1 (3–4 PKs) ^{2OT}	10–3–4	Klöckner Stadium (2,106); Charlottesville, VA
NCAA Tournament
November 19; 1:00 p.m., ESPN+	(7) No. 11	FIU; Second Round	W 2–1 ^{2OT}	11–3–4	Klöckner Stadium (1,372); Charlottesville, VA
November 25; 1:00 p.m., ESPN+	(7) No. 11	Indiana; Third Round	L 0–1	11–4–4	Klöckner Stadium (2,746); Charlottesville, VA
*Non-conference game. ^{#}Rankings from United Soccer Coaches. (#) Tournament seedings in parentheses. All times are in Eastern.

== Awards and honors ==
Recipient	Award	Date	Ref.
Leo Afonso	Pre-Season All-ACC Team	August 26	
Stephen Annor Gyamfi	ACC Offensive Player of the Week	September 19	
Joey Batrouni	ACC Defensive Player of the Week	October 3	
Mouhameth Thiam	ACC Co-Offensive Player of the Week	October 17	
Stephen Annor Gyamfi	ACC Offensive Player of the Week	October 24	
Mouhameth Thiam	ACC Co-Midfielder of the Year	November 8	
Stephen Annor Gyamfi	Freshman of the Year	November 8	
Mouhameth Thiam	All-ACC First Team	November 8	
Stephen Annor Gyamfi	All-ACC First Team	November 8	
Brendan Lambe	All-ACC Freshman Team	November 8	
Stephen Annor Gyamfi	All-ACC Freshman Team	November 8	

== 2024 MLS Super Draft ==
Player	Team	Round	Pick #	Position
(United States) Aidan O'Connor	New York Red Bulls	1	12	DF
(Ghana) Stephen Annor Gyamfi	Houston Dynamo	1	26	FW
(Brazil) Leo Afonso	Inter Miami	2	32	FW

== Rankings ==
Ranking movements Legend: ██ Increase in ranking ██ Decrease in ranking — = Not ranked RV = Received votes
	Week																
Poll	Pre	1	2	3	4	5	6	7	8	9	10	11	12	13	14	15	Final
United Soccer	15	RV	—	—	RV	—	RV	—	18	14	9	11	Not released				13
TopDrawer Soccer	—	—	—	—	22	—	—	—	22	12	9	12	15	9	12	12	12
