= 2023 North Carolina Tar Heels men's soccer team =

American college soccer season

2023 North Carolina Tar Heels men's soccer

NCAA Tournament, Quarterfinals
- Conference: Atlantic Coast Conference
- Record: 11–4–7 (2–3–3 ACC)
- Head coach: Carlos Somoano (13th season)
- Assistant coaches: Grant Porter (13th season); Michael Harrington (2nd season)
- Home stadium: Dorrance Field

2023 ACC men's soccer standings
	Conf.					Overall
Team	W		L		T	W		L		T
Atlantic
No. 15 Wake Forest +	4	–	1	–	3	11	–	3	–	5
No. 1 Clemson ‡	4	–	2	–	2	15	–	3	–	5
No. 25 Syracuse +	2	–	1	–	5	9	–	5	–	7
No. 24 Louisville +	2	–	4	–	2	12	–	6	–	3
NC State	1	–	5	–	2	6	–	9	–	3
Boston College	0	–	5	–	3	3	–	9	–	5
Coastal
No. 2 Notre Dame +	6	–	0	–	2	13	–	3	–	6
No. 13 Virginia +	5	–	2	–	1	11	–	4	–	4
No. 20 Duke+	4	–	3	–	1	11	–	4	–	3
No. 6 North Carolina +	2	–	3	–	3	11	–	3	–	7
Pittsburgh +	2	–	3	–	3	6	–	7	–	4
Virginia Tech	2	–	5	–	1	4	–	9	–	4
‡ – ACC tournament champion + – Also invited to the 2023 NCAA tournament; As of December 12, 2023; Rankings from United Soccer Coaches; Source: The ACC

The 2023 North Carolina Tar Heels men's soccer team represented the University of North Carolina at Chapel Hill during the 2023 NCAA Division I men's soccer season. It was the 77th season of the university fielding a program. The Tar Heels were led by thirteenth year head coach Carlos Somoano and played their home games at Dorrance Field.

The Tar Heels finished the season 11–4–7 overall and 2–3–3 in ACC play to finish in fourth place in the Coastal Division. As the seventh overall seed in the ACC Tournament, they defeated tenth seed Virginia Tech in the First Round, upset second seed Wake Forest in the Quarterfinals, and sixth seed Syracuse to reach the ACC Final. There they faced off against Clemson and fell in a penalty shoot-out. They received an at-large bid to the NCAA Tournament and were the third overall seed. They defeated Memphis in the First Round, and advanced in another penalty shoot-out over fourteenth seed Hofstra in the Third Round. They were unable to advance further as they lost to Oregon State in the Quarterfinals to end their season.

== Background ==
The Tar Heels finished the season 8–6–5 overall and 2–2–4 in ACC play to finish in fourth place in the Coastal Division. As the seventh overall seed in the ACC Tournament, they defeated Boston College in the First Round, before losing to eventual champions Syracuse in the Quarterfinals. They received an at-large bid to the NCAA Tournament. As an unseeded team, they lost to High Point in the First Round to end their season.

== Player movement ==
=== Departures ===
Departures
Name	Number	Pos.	Height	Weight	Year	Hometown	Reason for Departure
Benjamin Kabeya	4	MF/DF	5'10"	183	Freshman	Berne, Switzerland	Signed professional contract
Julian Hinojosa	5	DF	5'8"	155	Senior	Dallas, Texas	Graduated
Hilli Goldhar	11	MF	5'9"	150	Graduate Student	Toronto, Canada	Graduated
Key White	13	FW	5'10"	159	(redshirt) Junior	Norfolk, Virginia	Transferred to Old Dominion
Victor Olofsson	14	MF	5'11"	160	Senior	Vaernamo, Sweden	Graduated
James Person	16	DF	6'0"	160	Senior	Walnut Creek, California	Graduated
Cameron Fisher	17	MF	5'11"	160	Senior	Palo Alto, California	Graduated
Matthew Senanou	18	DF	6'4"	208	Sophomore	Chicago, Illinois	Transferred to Xavier
Milo Garvanian	22	DF/MF	6'1"	160	Graduate Student	Albuquerque, New Mexico	Graduated; drafted 54th overall in the 2023 MLS SuperDraft
Sebastian Schacht	23	MF	6'0"	175	Graduate Student	Christchurch, New Zealand	Graduated
Marco Saborio-Perez	24	GK	6'2"	190	Graduate Student	Geneva, Switzerland	Graduated
Akeim Clarke	25	FW	6'3"	190	Junior	Windsor, Connecticut	—
Tim Schels	28	MF	5'9"	161	Junior	Erding, Germany	Transferred to FIU
Luc Granitur	31	FW	5'9"	155	Sophomore	Vero Beach, Florida	Transferred to North Florida
Guy Vivaldini	36	MF/FW	6'2"	174	Sophomore	Itupeva, Brazil	Transferred to Xavier
Derek Lippert	37	DF	5'9"	149	Freshman	Mexico City, Mexico	—
Finn Sansom	40	DF/MF	5'11"	183	Freshman	Shrewsbury, England	—
Rohit Thakur	41	FW	5'7"	140	Freshman	Morrisville, North Carolina	—

=== Incoming transfers ===
Departures
Name	Number	Pos.	Height	Weight	Year	Hometown	Previous School
Vemund Hole Vik	4	DF	6'0"	175	Graduate Student	Ålesund, Norway	Elon
Martin Vician	9	FW	6'4"	N/A	Graduate Student	Bratislava, Slovakia	Harvard
Quenzi Huerman	11	MF/FW	6'0"	172	Graduate Student	Vannes, France	Seton Hall
David Bercedo	13	FW	5'8"	148	Graduate Student	Madrid, Spain	Quinnipiac
Collin Travasos	24	GK	6'3"	195	Graduate Student	Encinitas, California	California

=== Recruiting class ===
Name	Nat.	Hometown	Club	TDS Rating
Kevin Gorbell; DF	USA	Boca Raton, Florida	Inter Miami CF Academy	3/5 stars
Andrew Kitch; FW	USA	Medford, New Jersey	JFC Real	3/5 stars
William Lorentz; MF	USA	Winston-Salem, North Carolina	North Carolina Fusion	3/5 stars
Daniel Lugo; FW	USA	Saint Petersburg, Florida	Tampa Bay United	3/5 stars
John McDowell; MF	USA	Chapel Hill, North Carolina	North Carolina FC	3/5 stars
Michael Melilli; DF	USA	Palm Harbor, Florida	Tampa Bay United	3/5 stars
Maclovio Swett; MF	USA	Denver, Colorado	Colorado Rapids Academy	3/5 stars
Kaitaro Tamashiro; FW	USA	Honolulu, Hawaii	IMG Academy	3/5 stars
Gabriel Velasco; GK	USA	Raleigh, North Carolina	IMG Academy	3/5 stars

== Squad ==
=== Roster ===
As of January 30, 2024

Note: Flags indicate national team as defined under FIFA eligibility rules; some limited exceptions apply. Players may hold more than one non-FIFA nationality.

No.	Pos.	Nation	Player
0	GK	USA	Quinn Colsson
1	GK	USA	Andrew Cordes
2	DF	GER	Til Zinnhardt
4	DF	NOR	Vemund Hole Vik
6	MF	USA	Andres Cardenas
7	MF	USA	Sam Williams
8	MF	USA	Jameson Charles
10	MF	ARG	Juan Caffaro
11	MF	FRA	Quenzi Huerman
12	GK	HKG	Aristide Gry
13	FW	ESP	David Bercedo
14	MF	USA	John McDowell
15	DF	USA	Riley Thomas
16	MF	USA	Maclovio Swett
17	FW	USA	Daniel Lugo
18	DF	AUS	Charlie Harper
19	MF	USA	Jonathan Sinclair
20	MF	GHA	Ernest Bawa

No.	Pos.	Nation	Player
21	DF	USA	Parker O'Ferral
22	FW	USA	Kai Tamashiro
23	FW	USA	Andrew Kitch
24	GK	USA	Collin Travasos
26	DF	USA	Matt Edwards
27	MF	USA	Andrew Czech
28	DF	USA	Kevin Gorbell
29	MF	USA	Yaya Bakayoko
30	GK	USA	Gabe Belasco
31	DF	USA	Michael Melilli
32	MF	USA	Tate Lorentz
33	DF	USA	Riley Berge
34	MF	USA	Ahmad Al-Qaq
35	MF	USA	Ty Johnson
38	FW	USA	Lucas Ross
39	MF	USA	Hayden Morgan
42	FW	USA	Daniel Kutsch

=== Team management ===
Position	Staff
Athletic Director	Bubba Cunningham
Head coach	Carlos Somoano
Assistant Coach	Grant Porter
Assistant Coach	Michael Harrington

== Schedule ==
Date Time, TV	Rank^{#}	Opponent^{#}	Result	Record	Site (Attendance) City, State
Exhibition
August 11*; 7:00 p.m.		at Campbell	None Reported	–	Eakes Athletics Complex; Buies Creek, NC
August 15*; 7:30 p.m.		High Point	None Reported	–	Dorrance Field; Chapel Hill, NC
August 18*; 7:00 p.m.		James Madison	None Reported	–	Dorrance Field; Chapel Hill, NC
Regular season
August 24*; 7:30 p.m., ACCNX		Loyola (MD)	T 1–1	0–0–1	Dorrance Field (3,335); Chapel Hill, NC
August 27*; 7:30 p.m., ACCNX		American	Cancelled	—	Dorrance Field; Chapel Hill, NC
September 1*; 7:00 p.m., ESPN+		at East Tennessee State	W 2–1	1–0–1	Summers-Taylor Stadium (1,127); Johnson City, TN
September 4*; 7:00 p.m., ESPN+		at VCU	W 4–1	2–0–1	Sports Backers Stadium (607); Richmond, VA
September 8; 7:00 p.m., ACCNX		at Virginia Tech	T 1–1	2–0–2 (0–0–1)	Thompson Field (2,407); Blacksburg, VA
September 15; 7:00 p.m., ACCNX		No. 10 Notre Dame	T 1–1	2–0–3 (0–0–2)	Dorrance Field (4,298); Chapel Hill, NC
September 19*; 7:00 p.m., ACCNX		UNC Wilmington	W 3–0	3–0–3	Dorrance Field (769); Chapel Hill, NC
September 24; 4:00 p.m., ACCNX		No. 11 Duke; Rivalry	W 2–1	4–0–3 (1–0–2)	Dorrance Field (2,858); Chapel Hill, NC
September 29; 7:00 p.m., ACCNX	No. 18	at Pittsburgh	T 0–0	4–0–4 (1–0–3)	Ambrose Urbanic Field (1,010); Pittsburgh, PA
October 3*; 7:00 p.m., ACCNX	No. 13	Elon	W 2–0	5–0–4	Dorrance Field (814); Chapel Hill, NC
October 6; 7:30 p.m., ACCN	No. 13	No. 18 Syracuse	L 0–1	5–1–4 (1–1–3)	Dorrance Field (2,387); Chapel Hill, NC
October 10*; 6:00 p.m., ACCNX	No. 14	Florida Gulf Coast	W 3–0	6–1–4	Dorrance Field (1,114); Chapel Hill, NC
October 14; 7:00 p.m., ACCNX	No. 14	at No. 4 Wake Forest	L 0–1	6–2–4 (1–2–3)	Spry Stadium (2,454); Winston–Salem, NC
October 17*; 7:00 p.m., ACCNX	No. 11	William & Mary	T 0–0	6–2–5	Dorrance Field (684); Chapel Hill, NC
October 22; 5:00 p.m., ACCNX	No. 11	Louisville	W 2–0	7–2–5 (2–2–3)	Dorrance Field (3,887); Chapel Hill, NC
October 27; 7:30 p.m., ACCN	No. 10т	at No. 14 Virginia	L 0–1	7–3–5 (2–3–3)	Klöckner Stadium (2,478); Charlottesville, VA
ACC Tournament
November 1; 6:00 p.m., ACCN	(7) No. 13	(10) Virginia Tech; First Round	W 4–1	8–3–5	Dorrance Field (991); Chapel Hill, NC
November 5; 4:00 p.m., ACCN	(7) No. 13	at (2) No. 6 Wake Forest; Quarterfinals	W 1–0	9–3–5	Spry Stadium (2,958); Winston–Salem, NC
November 8; 6:00 p.m., ACCN	(7) No. 7	at (6) No. 18 Syracuse; Semifinals	W 3–1	10–3–5	SU Soccer Stadium (1,570); Syracuse, NY
November 12; 12:00 p.m., ACCN	(7) No. 7	vs. (4) No. 14 Clemson; Final	T 1–1 (3–5 PKs)	10–3–6	WakeMed Soccer Park (2,318); Cary, NC
NCAA Tournament
November 19; 5:00 p.m., ESPN+	(3) No. 7	Memphis; Second Round	W 2–0	11–3–6	Dorrance Field (1,255); Chapel Hill, NC
November 26; 5:00 p.m., ESPN+	(3) No. 7	(14) No. 17 Hofstra; Third Round	T 2–2 (5–3 PKs)	11–3–7	Dorrance Field (1,632); Chapel Hill, NC
December 2; 5:00 p.m., ESPN+	(3) No. 7	Oregon State; Quarterfinals	L 0–1	11–4–7	Dorrance Field (3,127); Chapel Hill, NC
*Non-conference game. ^{#}Rankings from United Soccer Coaches. (#) Tournament seedings in parentheses. All times are in Eastern.

== Awards and honors ==
Recipient	Award	Date	Ref.
Vemund Hole Vik	Pre-Season Hermann Trophy Watchlist	August 24	
Sam Williams	Pre-Season All-ACC Team	August 26	
Quenzi Huerman	ACC Co-Offensive Player of the Week	September 26	
Andrew Cordes	ACC Defensive Player of the Week	October 24	
Quenzi Huerman	All-ACC First Team	November 8, 2023	
Riley Thomas	All-ACC Second Team	November 8, 2023	
Sam Williams	All-ACC Third Team	November 8, 2023	
Quenzi Huerman	ACC All-Tournament Team	November 12, 2023	
Martin Vician	ACC All-Tournament Team	November 12, 2023	
Til Zinnhardt	ACC All-Tournament Team	November 12, 2023	

== Rankings ==
Ranking movements Legend: ██ Increase in ranking ██ Decrease in ranking — = Not ranked т = Tied with team above or below
	Week																
Poll	Pre	1	2	3	4	5	6	7	8	9	10	11	12	13	14	15	Final
United Soccer	—	—	—	—	—	18	13	14	11	10т	13	7	Not released				6
TopDrawer Soccer	—	—	—	—	—	19	11	12	13	18	22	15	8	6	6	6	6
