= 2023 Pittsburgh Panthers men's soccer team =

American college soccer season

2023 Pittsburgh Panthers men's soccer

NCAA Tournament, First Round
- Conference: Atlantic Coast Conference
- Record: 6–7–4 (2–3–3 ACC)
- Head coach: Jay Vidovich (8th season)
- Assistant coaches: Bryce Cregan (2nd season); Josh Oldroyd (1st season); Zack Schilawski (1st season)
- Home stadium: Ambrose Urbanic Field

2023 ACC men's soccer standings
	Conf.					Overall
Team	W		L		T	W		L		T
Atlantic
No. 15 Wake Forest +	4	–	1	–	3	11	–	3	–	5
No. 1 Clemson ‡	4	–	2	–	2	15	–	3	–	5
No. 25 Syracuse +	2	–	1	–	5	9	–	5	–	7
No. 24 Louisville +	2	–	4	–	2	12	–	6	–	3
NC State	1	–	5	–	2	6	–	9	–	3
Boston College	0	–	5	–	3	3	–	9	–	5
Coastal
No. 2 Notre Dame +	6	–	0	–	2	13	–	3	–	6
No. 13 Virginia +	5	–	2	–	1	11	–	4	–	4
No. 20 Duke+	4	–	3	–	1	11	–	4	–	3
No. 6 North Carolina +	2	–	3	–	3	11	–	3	–	7
Pittsburgh +	2	–	3	–	3	6	–	7	–	4
Virginia Tech	2	–	5	–	1	4	–	9	–	4
‡ – ACC tournament champion + – Also invited to the 2023 NCAA tournament; As of December 12, 2023; Rankings from United Soccer Coaches; Source: The ACC

The 2023 Pittsburgh Panthers men's soccer team represented the University of Pittsburgh during the 2023 NCAA Division I men's soccer season. The Panthers were led by head coach Jay Vidovich, in his eighth season. They played their home games at Ambrose Urbanic Field. This was the team's 70th season playing organized men's college soccer and their 11th playing in the Atlantic Coast Conference.

The Panthers finished the season 6–7–4 overall and 2–3–3 in ACC play to finish in fifth place in the Coastal Division. As the eighth overall seed in the ACC Tournament, they were defeated by ninth seed Louisville in the First Round in overtime. They received an at-large bid to the NCAA Tournament and were an unseeded team. They lost in the First Round to James Madison to end their season.

== Background ==
The Panthers finished the season 12–5–5 overall and 3–2–3 in ACC play to finish in third place in the Coastal Division. As the sixth overall seed in the ACC Tournament, they defeated eleventh seed NC State in the first round before losing to third seed Virginia in the Quarterfinals. They received an at-large bid to the NCAA Tournament and were an unseeded team. They defeated Cleveland State in the First Round, Akron in the Second Round, first overall seed Kentucky in the Third Round, and Portland in the Quarterfinals to make the College Cup. There they lost to Indiana to end their season.

== Player movement ==
=== Players leaving ===
Departures
Name	Number	Pos.	Height	Weight	Year	Hometown	Reason for Departure
Joe van der Sar	1	GK	6'1"	180	Senior	Noordwijk, Netherlands	Graduated
Leonardo Andrade	3	MF	6'2"	170	Freshman	São Paulo, Brazil	Signed with Brave SC
Mohammad Abualnadi	4	DF	6'1"	175	Senior	Leawood, Kansas	Graduated
Yanis Leerman	5	DF	6'2"	175	Graduate Student	Troyes, France	Graduated
Lucas Rosa	6	DF	5'8"	163	Graduate Student	São Paulo, Brazil	Graduated
Valentin Noël	8	MF	5'10"	150	Senior	Niort, France	Graduated; drafted 20th overall in 2023 MLS SuperDraft
Bertin Jacquesson	10	FW	6'0"	160	Junior	Lorrez-le-Bocage-Préaux, France	Drafted 16th overall in 2023 MLS SuperDraft
Rodrigo Almeida	11	MF	5'10"	163	Graduate Student	Salvador, Brazil	Graduated
Ideal Shefqeti	15	MF	6'0"	178	Graduate Student	Lignano Sabbiadoro, Italy	Graduated
Henrique Gallina	16	DF	6'1"	180	Graduate Student	São Paulo, Brazil	Graduated
Josh Luchini	19	FW	6'0"	165	Graduate Student	Wexford, Pennsylvania	Graduated
Djavid Abdullatif	23	FW	6'2"	185	Freshman	Itzehoe, Germany	Transferred to Coastal Carolina
Jackson Walti	24	MF	5'10"	169	Graduate Student	St. Augustine, Florida	Graduated; drafted 56th overall in 2023 MLS SuperDraft
Kilian Vallant	31	GK	6'1"	176	Freshman	Salzburg, Austria	Transferred to Coastal Carolina
Andrew Noel	32	GK	6'5"	197	(redshirt) Freshman	Montclair, New Jersey	Transferred to Rutgers

=== Players arriving ===
==== Incoming transfers ====
Incoming transfers
Name	Number	Pos.	Height	Year	Hometown	Previous School
Felipe Mercado	8	MF	5'11"	Senior	Medellín, Colombia	College of Charleston
Joao Souza	11	MF	5'7"	Graduate Student	Cuiabá, Brazil	Marshall
Nick Blacklock	16	MF	5'11"	Graduate Student	Hellertown, Pennsylvania	Virginia Tech
Luka Kozomara	19	MF	6'3"	Junior	Cliffside Park, New Jersey	Temple

==== Recruiting class ====
Name	Nat.	Hometown	Club	TDS Rating
Ameer Abdullah; DF	(United States)	Chicago, Illinois	Chicago Fire Academy	3/5 stars
Kyle Durham; GK	(United States)	Brooklyn, New York	Met Oval Academy	N/A
Zahir Dyke; FW	(United States)	Kansas City, Missouri	Sporting Kansas City Academy	N/A
Santiago Ferreira; MF	(Colombia)	Cali, Colombia	FC Dallas Academy	4/5 stars
Alex Hauskrecht; FW	(United States)	Pittsburgh, Pennsylvania	Pittsburgh Riverhounds Academy	N/A
Jackson Moxom; GK	(United States)	Milwaukee, Wisconsin	FC Cincinnati Academy	N/A
Eli Mumford; GK	(United States)	Chapel Hill, North Carolina	Richmond Kickers	3/5 stars
Massimo Murania; FW	(United States)	Queens, New York	NYCFC Academy	N/A
Albert Thorsen; FW	(Norway)	Drammen, Norway	Strømsgodset Toppfotball	N/A

== Squad ==
=== Roster ===
As of January 31, 2024

Note: Flags indicate national team as defined under FIFA eligibility rules; some limited exceptions apply. Players may hold more than one non-FIFA nationality.

No.	Pos.	Nation	Player
0	GK	USA	Cabral Carter
1	GK	USA	Kyle Durham
2	DF	USA	Jackson Gilman
3	DF	FRA	Raphael Cilli
5	DF	GER	Fabian Grau
7	FW	FRA	Abdoulaye Toure
8	MF	COL	Felipe Mercado
9	FW	NOR	Albert Thorsen
10	MF	BRA	Guilherme Feitosa
11	MF	BRA	Joao Souza
12	DF	FRA	Mateo Maillefaud
13	DF	USA	Noah Hall
15	FW	USA	Zahir Dyke
16	MF	USA	Nick Blacklock

No.	Pos.	Nation	Player
17	FW	USA	Luis Sahmkow
18	DF	USA	Ameer Abdullah
19	MF	USA	Luka Kozomara
20	MF	USA	Mateo Stoka
21	MF	SRB	Filip Mirkovic
22	MF	FRA	Mathys Lefebvre
23	FW	USA	Massimo Murania
24	DF	USA	Abraham Brown
25	FW	USA	Eben McIntyre
26	MF	USA	Michael Sullivan
27	FW	USA	Alex Hauskrecht
28	MF	USA	Santiago Ferreira
31	GK	USA	Eli Mumford
32	GK	USA	Jack Moxom

=== Team management ===
Position	Staff
Athletic Director	Heather Lyke
Head coach	Jay Vidovich
Assistant coach	Bryce Cregan
Assistant coach	Josh Oldroyd
Assistant coach	Zack Schilawski

== Schedule ==
Date Time, TV	Rank^{#}	Opponent^{#}	Result	Record	Site (Attendance) City, State
Exhibition
August 12*	No. 5	Cleveland State	Not Reported	—	Krenzler Field; Cleveland, OH
August 18*	No. 5	Michigan State	Not Reported	—	Ambrose Urbanic Field; Pittsburgh, PA
Regular season
August 24*; 7:00 p.m.	No. 5	Penn State	T 1–1	0–0–1	Ambrose Urbanic Field (2,000); Pittsburgh, PA
August 28* :00 p.m.	No. 5	Howard	W 5–0	1–0–1	Ambrose Urbanic Field (734); Pittsburgh, PA
September 1*; 4:00 p.m.	No. 8	at Georgetown	L 1–4	1–1–1	Shaw Field (977); Washington, D.C.
September 2*; 5:00 p.m.		No. 2 Marshall	L 1–3	1–2–1	Ambrose Urbanic Field (1,081); Pittsburgh, PA
September 9; 7:00 p.m.		No. 9 Wake Forest	W 3–0	2–2–1 (1–0–0)	Ambrose Urbanic Field (714); Pittsburgh, PA
September 15; 6:00 p.m.	No. 17	at Boston College	T 0–0	2–2–2 (1–0–1)	Newton Campus Soccer Field (636); Chestnut Hill, MA
September 18*; 7:00 p.m.	No. 17	Fairleigh Dickinson	W 5–1	3–2–2	Ambrose Urbanic Field (419); Pittsburgh, PA
September 22; 7:00 p.m.		at No. 7 Syracuse	L 3–2	3–3–2 (1–1–1)	SU Soccer Stadium (1,911); Syracuse, NY
September 25*; 7:00 p.m.		No. 19 Denver	W 3–1	4–3–2	Ambrose Urbanic Field (703); Pittsburgh, PA
September 29; 7:00 p.m.		No. 18 North Carolina	T 0–0	4–3–3 (1–1–2)	Ambrose Urbanic Field (1,010); Pittsburgh, PA
October 6; 7:00 p.m.	No. 20	Virginia Tech	W 3–1	5–3–3 (2–1–2)	Ambrose Urbanic Field (913); Pittsburgh, PA
October 13; 7:00 p.m.	No. ww	at Virginia	L 1–2	5–4–3 (2–2–2)	Klöckner Stadium (2,551); Charlottesville, VA
October 17*; 7:00 p.m.	No. 23	Duquesne	W 2–0	6–4–3	Ambrose Urbanic Field (975); Pittsburgh, PA
October 21; 7:00 p.m.	No. 23	No. 9 Duke	T 0–0	6–4–4 (2–2–3)	Ambrose Urbanic Field (1,180); Pittsburgh, PA
October 27; 7:00 p.m.	No. 20	at No. 5 Notre Dame	L 0–6	6–5–4 (2–3–3)	Alumni Stadium (2,224); Notre Dame, IN
ACC Tournament
November 1; 8:00 p.m., ACCN	(8)	(9) Louisville; First Round	L 1–2 ^{2OT}	6–6–4	Ambrose Urbanic Field (717); Pittsburgh, PA
NCAA Tournament
November 16; 7:00 p.m., ESPN+		James Madison; First Round	L 2–3	6–7–4	Ambrose Urbanic Field (764); Pittsburgh, PA
*Non-conference game. ^{#}Rankings from United Soccer Coaches. (#) Tournament seedings in parentheses. All times are in Eastern.

== Awards and honors ==
Recipient	Award	Date	Ref.
Filip Mirkovic	Pre-Season Hermann Trophy Watchlist	August 24	
Filip Mirkovic	Pre-Season All-ACC Team	August 26	
Filip Mirkovic	All-ACC First Team	November 8, 2023	
Jackson Gilman	All-ACC Third Team	November 8, 2023	
Albert Thorsen	All-ACC Freshman Team	November 8, 2023	

== Rankings ==
Ranking movements Legend: ██ Increase in ranking ██ Decrease in ranking — = Not ranked RV = Received votes
	Week																
Poll	Pre	1	2	3	4	5	6	7	8	9	10	11	12	13	14	15	Final
United Soccer	5	8	RV	17	RV	RV	20	11	23	20	—	—	Not released				—
TopDrawer Soccer	7	8	11	8	16	16	10	9	15	10	20	—	—	—	—	—	—

== 2024 MLS Super draft ==
Player	Team	Round	Pick #	Position
(United States) Filip Mirkovic	Orlando City	2	54	MF
