= 2023 Wake Forest Demon Deacons men's soccer team =

American college soccer season

2023 Wake Forest Demon Deacons men's soccer

ACC Atlantic Division champions

NCAA Tournament, Second Round
- Conference: Atlantic Coast Conference
- U. Soc. Coaches poll: No. 15
- TopDrawerSoccer.com: No. 18
- Record: 11–3–5 (4–1–3 ACC)
- Head coach: Bobby Muuss (9th season)
- Assistant coaches: Steve Armas (9th season); Dane Brenner (13th season); Ade Taiwo (1st season)
- Home stadium: Spry Stadium

2023 ACC men's soccer standings
	Conf.					Overall
Team	W		L		T	W		L		T
Atlantic
No. 15 Wake Forest +	4	–	1	–	3	11	–	3	–	5
No. 1 Clemson ‡	4	–	2	–	2	15	–	3	–	5
No. 25 Syracuse +	2	–	1	–	5	9	–	5	–	7
No. 24 Louisville +	2	–	4	–	2	12	–	6	–	3
NC State	1	–	5	–	2	6	–	9	–	3
Boston College	0	–	5	–	3	3	–	9	–	5
Coastal
No. 2 Notre Dame +	6	–	0	–	2	13	–	3	–	6
No. 13 Virginia +	5	–	2	–	1	11	–	4	–	4
No. 20 Duke+	4	–	3	–	1	11	–	4	–	3
No. 6 North Carolina +	2	–	3	–	3	11	–	3	–	7
Pittsburgh +	2	–	3	–	3	6	–	7	–	4
Virginia Tech	2	–	5	–	1	4	–	9	–	4
‡ – ACC tournament champion + – Also invited to the 2023 NCAA tournament; As of December 12, 2023; Rankings from United Soccer Coaches; Source: The ACC

The 2023 Wake Forest Demon Deacons men's soccer team represented Wake Forest University during the 2023 NCAA Division I men's soccer season. It was the 77th season of the university fielding a program. It was the program's ninth season with Bobby Muuss as head coach. The Demon Deacons played their home matches at Spry Stadium.

The Demon Deacons finished the season 11–3–5 overall and 4–1–3 in ACC play to finish in first place in the Atlantic Division. As the second overall seed in the ACC Tournament they earned a by into the Second Round where they lost to North Carolina. They received an at-large bid to the NCAA Tournament. They were the tenth overall seed and lost to Indiana in overtime in the Second Round to end their season.

== Background ==
The Demon Deacons finished the season 14–6–0 overall and 5–3–0 in ACC play to finish in second place in the Atlantic Division. As the fourth overall seed in the ACC Tournament they defeated Virginia Tech in the Second Round before losing to Clemson in the Quarterfinals. They received an at-large bid to the NCAA Tournament. They were an unseeded team and lost to Ohio State in the First Round to end their season.

== Player movement ==
=== Players leaving ===
Departures
Name	Number	Pos.	Height	Weight	Year	Hometown	Reason for departure
Takuma Suzuki	12	MF	6'1"	150	Senior	Peachtree City, Georgia	Graduated
David Wrona	13	MF	5'11"	165	Senior	Hoover, Alabama	Graduated
Omar Hernandez	17	MF	5'11"	175	Senior	Dalton, Georgia	Graduated
Cole McNally	31	GK	6'4"	220	(redshirt) Junior	Mount Airy, Maryland	Transferred to William & Mary
Sebastian Scrivner	33	DF	6'3"	180	Senior	Bellevue, Washington	Graduated

=== Players arriving ===
==== Incoming transfers ====
Incoming transfers
Name	Number	Pos.	Height	Weight	Year	Hometown	Previous school
Camilo Ponce	17	MF	5'9"	161	Sophomore	Amityville, New York	Boston College

==== Recruiting class ====
Name	Nat.	Hometown	Club	TDS Rating
Pranav DuBroff; DF	USA	Frisco, Texas	FC Dallas Academy	4/5 stars
Jonah Mednard; GK	USA	Congers, New York	New York City FC Academy	3/5 stars
Pariss Mitchell; FW	USA	Ontario, Canada	Toronto FC Academy	3/5 stars
Liam O'Gara; MF	USA	Winston-Salem, North Carolina	NC Fusion	2/5 stars
Ernesto Perez; MF	USA	Antioch, Illinois	Shattuck-Saint Mary's School	3/5 stars
Travis Smith; DF	USA	Louisville, Kentucky	Louisville City FC Academy	3/5 stars
Jeffrey White; MF	USA	Tampa, Florida	Tampa Bay United Academy	3/5 stars

== Squad ==
=== Roster ===
As of January 16, 2024

Note: Flags indicate national team as defined under FIFA eligibility rules; some limited exceptions apply. Players may hold more than one non-FIFA nationality.

No.	Pos.	Nation	Player
0	GK	USA	Jonah Mednard
1	GK	USA	Trace Alphin
2	DF	USA	Bo Cummins
3	DF	USA	Travis Smith Jr.
4	DF	USA	Alec Kenison
5	DF	USA	Samuel Jones
6	MF	USA	Aethan Yohannes
7	MF	USA	Nico Rabiu
8	FW	SEN	Babacar Niang
9	MF	USA	Roald Mitchell
10	MF	SWE	Oscar Sears
11	MF	USA	Leo Guarino
12	MF	USA	Jose Perez
13	MF	USA	Jeffrey White
14	DF	USA	Jahlane Forbes
15	FW	USA	Mwinso Denkabe
16	DF	JPN	Hosei Kijima

No.	Pos.	Nation	Player
17	MF	USA	Camilo Ponce
18	MF	USA	Cooper Flax
19	DF	USA	Cristian Escribano
20	MF	USA	Ryan Fessler
21	FW	USA	Julian Kennedy
22	MF	PUR	Sidney Paris
23	DF	USA	Vlad Walent
24	MF	USA	Jake Swallen
25	MF	USA	Chase Oliver
26	MF	USA	Colin Thomas
27	DF	USA	Prince Amponsah
28	MF	USA	Nicolas Mancilla
30	GK	USA	Devin Armstrong
32	DF	USA	Garrison Tubbs
33	MF	USA	Liam O'Gara
34	DF	USA	Pranav DuBroff

=== Team management ===
Position	Staff
Athletic Director	John Currie
Head coach	Bobby Muuss
Associate head coach	Steve Armas
Associate head coach	Dane Brenner
Assistant coach	Ade Taiwo
Assistant Athletic Trainer	Michael White
Academic Counselor	Brooke Taylor
Sports Performance	David Bass

== Schedule ==
Date Time, TV	Rank^{#}	Opponent^{#}	Result	Record	Site (Attendance) City, State
Exhibition
August 13*; 7:00 p.m.	No. 18	Davidson	T 2–2	–	Alumni Soccer Stadium; Davidson, NC
August 19*; 7:00 p.m.	No. 18	Denver	W 3–2	–	Spry Stadium; Winston–Salem, NC
Regular season
August 24*; 7:00 p.m., ACCNX	No. 18	Grand Canyon	W 3–1	1–0–0	Spry Stadium (1,324); Winston–Salem, NC
August 27*; 6:00 p.m., ACCNX	No. 18	California	T 1–1	1–0–1	Spry Stadium (1,352); Winston–Salem, NC
September 1*; 7:30 p.m., B1G+	No. 16	at No. 20 Maryland	T 0–0	1–0–2	Ludwig Field (4,644); College Park, MD
September 5*; 7:00 p.m., ACCNX	No. 16	Furman	W 5–1	2–0–2	Spry Stadium (1,360); Winston–Salem, NC
September 9; 7:00 p.m., ACCNX	No. 9	at Pittsburgh	L 0–3	2–1–2 (0–1–0)	Ambrose Urbanic Field (714); Pittsburgh, PA
September 12*; 7:00 p.m., ACCNX	No. 20	Gardner–Webb	W 4–0	3–1–2	Spry Stadium (915); Winston–Salem, NC
September 16; 7:00 p.m., ACCNX	No. 20	No. 7 Syracuse	T 1–1	3–1–3 (0–1–1)	Spry Stadium (2,217); Winston–Salem, NC
September 19*; 7:00 p.m., ACCNX	No. 14	Liberty	W 3–1	4–1–3	Spry Stadium (753); Winston–Salem, NC
September 22; 6:00 p.m., ACCN	No. 14	Clemson	W 1–0	5–1–3 (1–1–1)	Spry Stadium (2,528); Winston–Salem, NC
September 26*; 7:00 p.m., FloFC	No. 10	at Campbell	W 3–1	6–1–3	Eakes Athletics Complex (307); Buies Creek, NC
September 29; 2:00 p.m., ACCNX	No. 10	at Boston College	W 1–0	7–1–3 (2–1–1)	Newton Campus Soccer Field (207); Chestnut Hill, MA
October 6; 7:00 p.m., ACCNX	No. 6	at NC State	W 3–0	8–1–3 (3–1–1)	Dail Soccer Field (1,636); Raleigh, NC
October 10*; 7:00 p.m., ACCNX	No. 4	Wofford	W 2–0	9–1–3	Spry Stadium (956); Winston–Salem, NC
October 14; 7:00 p.m., ACCNX	No. 4	No. 14 North Carolina	W 1–0	10–1–3 (4–1–1)	Spry Stadium (2,454); Winston–Salem, NC
October 17*; 7:00 p.m., ACCNX	No. 3	Robert Morris	W 5–1	11–1–3	Spry Stadium (699); Winston–Salem, NC
October 20; 8:00 p.m., ACCN	No. 3	No. 6 Notre Dame	T 1–1	11–1–4 (4–1–2)	Spry Stadium (2,261); Winston–Salem, NC
October 27; 7:00 p.m., ACCNX	No. 3	at Louisville	T 2–2	11–1–5 (4–1–3)	Lynn Stadium (1,052); Louisville, KY
ACC tournament
November 5; 4:00 p.m., ACCN	(2) No. 6	(7) No. 13 North Carolina; Quarterfinals	L 0–1	11–2–5	Spry Stadium (2,958); Winston–Salem, NC
NCAA tournament
November 19; 5:00 p.m., ESPN+	(10) No. 6	Indiana; Second Round	L 2–3 ^{2OT}	11–3–5	Spry Stadium (2,059); Winston–Salem, NC
*Non-conference game. ^{#}Rankings from United Soccer Coaches. (#) Tournament seedings in parentheses. All times are in Eastern.

== Awards and honors ==
Recipient	Award	Date	Ref.
Garrison Tubbs	Pre-Season Hermann Trophy Watchlist	August 24	
Hosei Kijima	Pre-Season All-ACC Team	August 26	
Trace Alphin	ACC Defensive Player of the Week	September 5	
Garrison Tubbs	ACC Defensive Player of the Week	October 17	
Garrison Tubbs	ACC Defensive Player of the Year	November 8	
Garrison Tubbs	All-ACC First Team	November 8	
Trace Alphin	All-ACC Second Team	November 8	
Jahlane Forbes	All-ACC Second Team	November 8	
Hosei Kijima	All-ACC Second Team	November 8	
Roald Mitchell	All-ACC Second Team	November 8	
Liam O'Gara	All-ACC Freshman Team	November 8	

== 2024 MLS Super Draft ==
Player	Team	Round	Pick #	Position
(Japan) Hosei Kijima	St. Louis City	1	17	MF
(United States) Jahlane Forbes	Charlotte FC	2	38	DF
(Senegal) Babacar Niang	Minnesota United	3	78	MF

== Rankings ==
Ranking movements Legend: ██ Increase in ranking ██ Decrease in ranking
	Week																
Poll	Pre	1	2	3	4	5	6	7	8	9	10	11	12	13	14	15	Final
United Soccer	18	16	9	20	14	10	6	4	3	3	6	6	Not released				15
TopDrawer Soccer	17	17	14	19	9	5	3	3	3	3	5	7	9	18	18	18	18
