= Bryce Boneau =

American soccer player (born 2002)

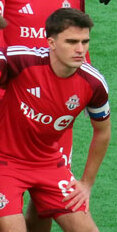

Personal information
- Full name: Bryce Richard Boneau
- Date of birth: December 27, 2002 (age 23)
- Place of birth: Keller, Texas, U.S.
- Height: 5 ft 10 in (1.78 m)
- Position: Midfielder

Team information
- Current team: Toronto FC II

Youth career
- Odyssey FC
- Solar SC
- FC Dallas

College career
Years	Team	Apps	(Gls)
2021–2024	Notre Dame Fighting Irish	51	(5)

Senior career*
Years	Team	Apps	(Gls)
2023	Texas United	8	(2)
2024	Tennessee SC	4	(0)
2025	Huntsville City FC	6	(0)
2026–	Toronto FC II	26	(3)
- * Club domestic league appearances and goals as of September 20, 2026

Bryce Richard Boneau (born December 27, 2002) is an American professional soccer player who plays as a midfielder for MLS Next Pro club Toronto FC II.

== Early life ==
Boneau played youth soccer with Odyssey FC and Solar SC. Later, he joined the FC Dallas Academy.

Boneau attended Keller High School, where he played for the soccer team. He missed most of his freshman season with an avulsion fracture in his hip, as well as most of his junior season with a fractured tibia. During his senior year, Boneau scored 18 goals and 19 assists in 21 matches, and helped lead Keller High School to the Conference 6A Region 1 tournament semifinals, a record for the Keller boys' soccer program and was named First Team All-State, Dallas Morning News Offensive Player of the Year, and the Gatorade National Boys' Soccer Player of the Year award. His senior season also ended early due to injury with a torn ACL, sprained MCL and torn meniscus.

== College career ==
Boneau signed a National Letter of Intent to play college soccer for the University of Notre Dame. He missed out on his freshman year due to an injury. On August 25, 2022, Boneau made his collegiate debut, starting and playing 78 minutes in a 1–3 loss to Seattle University. On August 29, 2022, Boneau dished out his first two collegiate assists in a 3–2 away win at Michigan State University. For the 2022 season he started all 17 games for the Fighting Irish.

Boneau had a breakout season his junior year, netting four goals and seven assists in 17 appearances for Notre Dame, including two goals during the 2023 ACC men's soccer tournament.

== Club career ==
In February 2023, Boneau signed with Texas United in USL League Two.

At the 2024 MLS SuperDraft, Boneau was selected by Nashville SC in the third round (75th overall). However, instead of turning professional, he returned to college for 2024. In the summer of 2024, he played with Tennessee SC in USL League Two. In February 2025, he signed with Huntsville City FC in MLS Next Pro, the second team of Nashville SC.

In January 2026, he signed with Toronto FC II in MLS Next Pro. On May 24, he scored his first goal for the club, in a match against Columbus Crew 2.
