= Dorrance Field =

Stadium in the United States

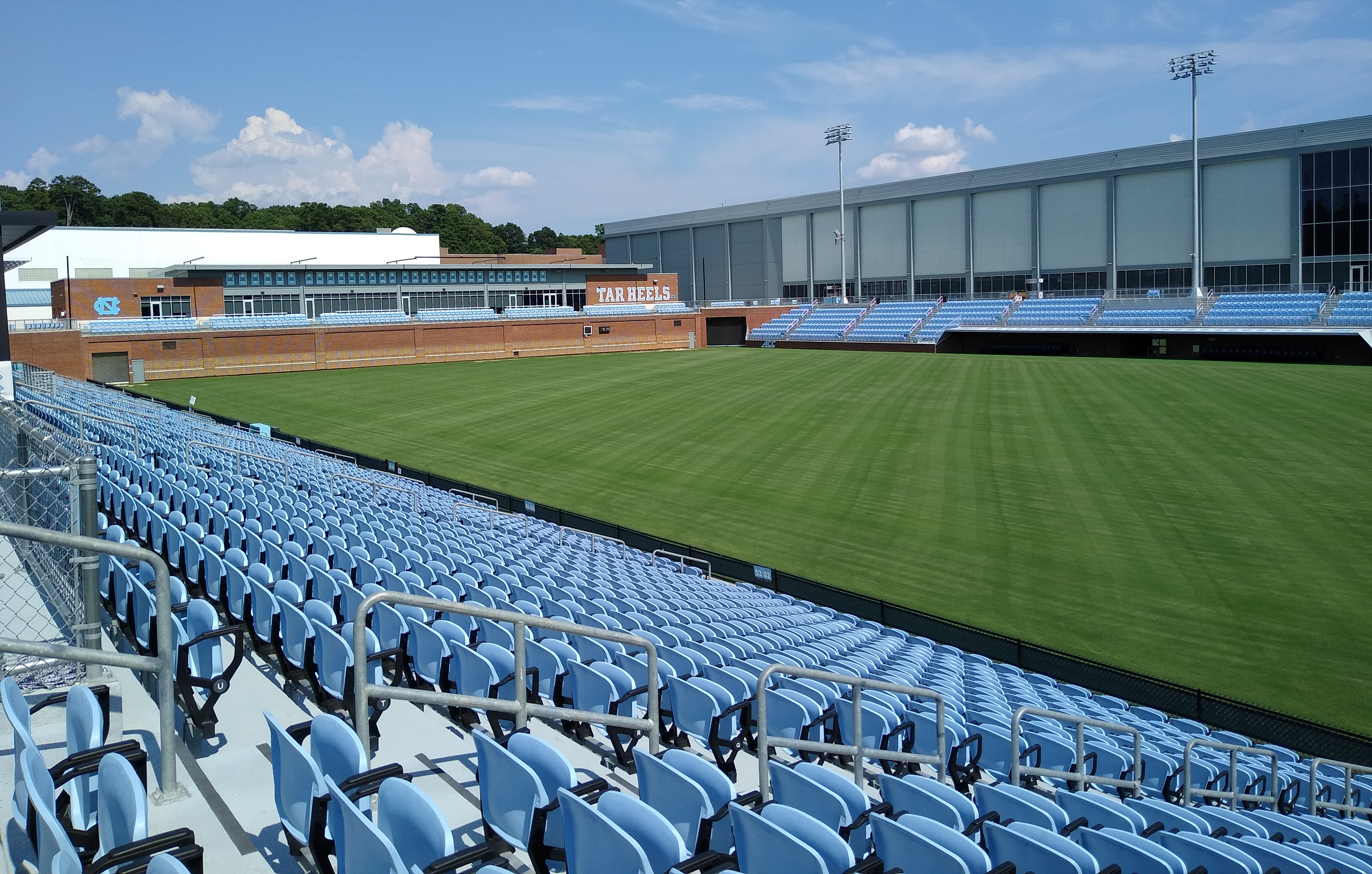
- the stadium as seen in 2020
- Interactive map of Dorrance Field
- Location: 309 Stadium Drive; Chapel Hill, North Carolina 27514
- Coordinates: 35°54′31″N 79°02′42″W
- Owner: University of North Carolina
- Operator: Univ. NC Athletics
- Capacity: 4,200
- Type: Stadium
- Surface: Grass
- Current use: Soccer; Lacrosse

Construction
- Groundbreaking: May 2017
- Opened: March 2, 2019; 7 years ago
- Architects: CRA Associates, Inc.
- General contractor: TA Loving

Tenants
- North Carolina Tar Heels (NCAA) teams: men's and women's soccer; men's and women's lacrosse

Website
- goheels.com/dorrancefield

Dorrance Field is the on-campus stadium at the University of North Carolina in Chapel Hill, North Carolina. The venue is the current home to the North Carolina Tar Heels men's and women's soccer and men's and women's lacrosse teams.

The stadium was constructed on the site of the former Fetzer Field. Construction on the new field started in May 2017 and the stadium opened on March 2, 2019.

The field was named after longtime women's soccer coach Anson Dorrance, with it was officially dedicated on September 29, 2019.
