= Alumni Stadium (Notre Dame) =

Soccer stadium in Notre Dame, Indiana

- Interactive map of Alumni Stadium
- Address: Notre Dame, IN
- Location: United States
- Coordinates: 41°41′52″N 86°13′43″W
- Owner: University of Notre Dame
- Operator: Notre Dame Athletics
- Capacity: 3,007
- Surface: Natural grass
- Current use: Soccer

Construction
- Groundbreaking: April 26, 2008
- Opened: September 1, 2009; 17 years ago
- Cost: $7.5 million
- Architect: RATIO Architects

Tenants
- Notre Dame Fighting Irish (NCAA) teams: men's and women's soccer

Website
- fightingirish.com/alumni-stadium

Alumni Stadium is the on-campus soccer stadium in natural grass at the University of Notre Dame in Notre Dame, Indiana. The current tenants are the Notre Dame Fighting Irish men's & women's soccer teams.

The 3,007 -seat stadium was built between April 26, 2008, and September 1, 2009. It was first used on September 4, 2009, when the women's team played North Carolina and the men's team played Wake Forest. Capacity is increased via a grass berm on the east end of the ground. Its largest crowd was 3,511 guests to assist the women's team versus Tulsa on September 2, 2011. It has hosted NCAA tournament games.
