= Atlantic Coast Conference Men's Soccer Coach of the Year =

ACC Men's Soccer Coach of the Year
- Awarded for: the best head coach in the Atlantic Coast Conference
- Country: United States
- Presented by: Atlantic Coast Sports Media Association (1975–present)
- First award: 1975
- Currently held by: Kevin Hudson, SMU

The Atlantic Coast Conference Men's Soccer Coach of the Year is an annual award given to the best head coach in the Atlantic Coast Conference during the NCAA Division I men's soccer season. The award has been given since 1975.

Notable winners of the award include: Bruce Arena (who later coached the United States men's soccer team and LA Galaxy), I. M. Ibrahim (who spent his entire coaching career with Clemson University), Anson Dorrance (who later simultaneously coached the University of Carolina's women's soccer team and the United States women's soccer team) and Jay Vidovich (who went on to coach Portland Timbers 2 for a season, before returning to collegiate soccer).

Vidovich has won the award the most times, with eight wins.

== Winners ==
=== Coach of the Year (1975–present) ===
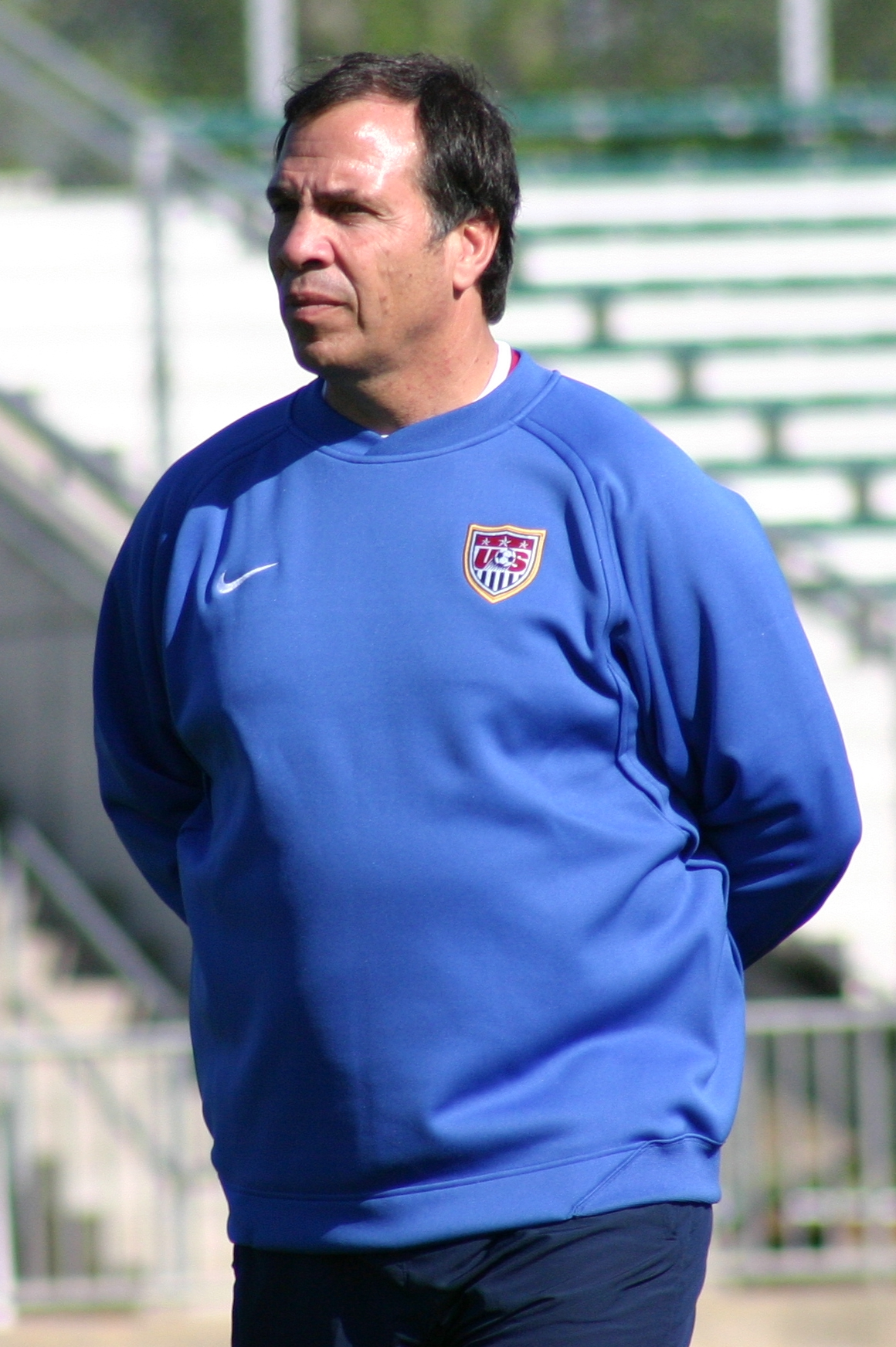
Bruce Arena is a seven-time winner of the award.

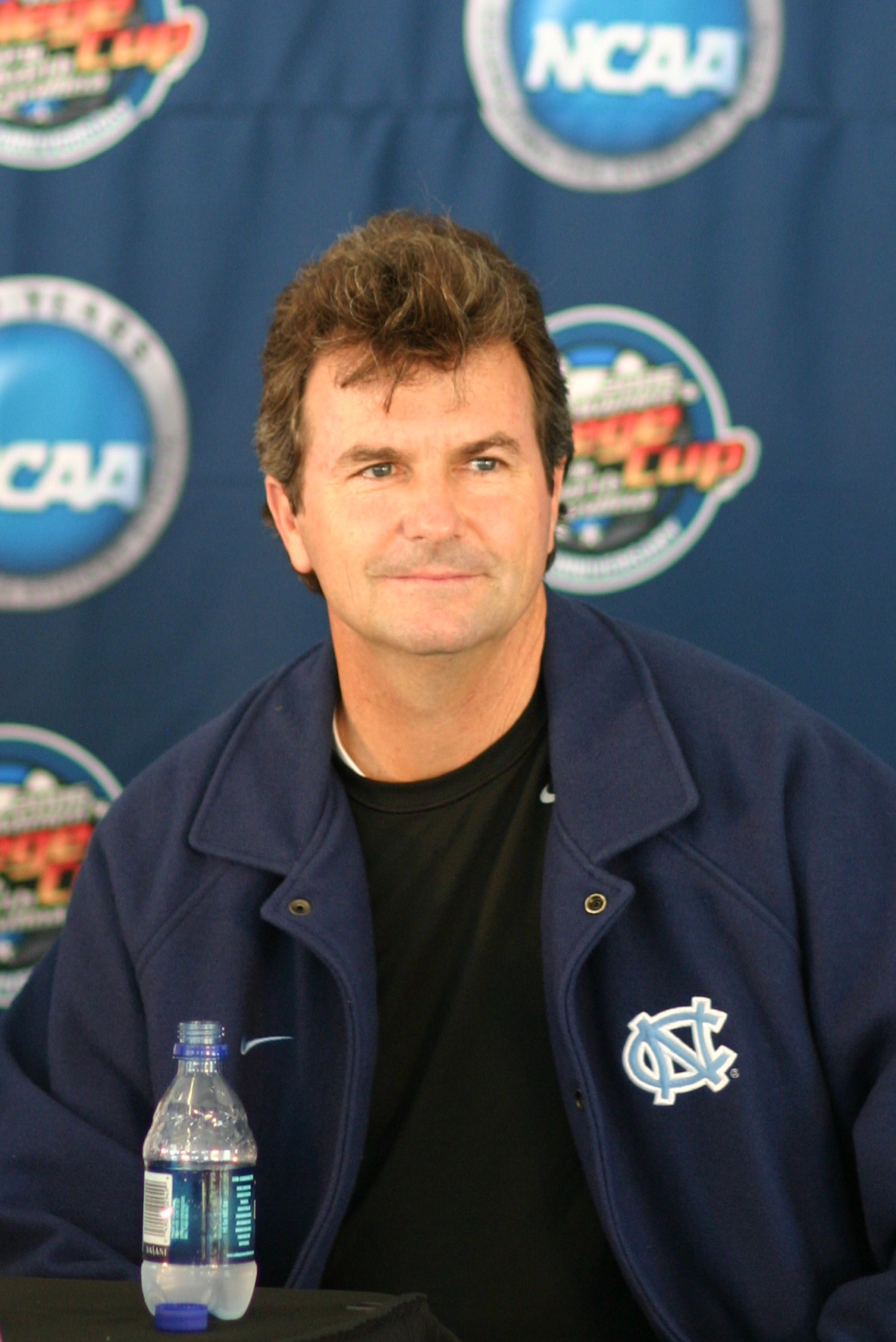
Anson Dorrance is a one-time winner.

Season	Coach	School	Reference
1975	Marvin Allen	North Carolina	
1976	Jim Dietsch	Maryland	
1977	Anson Dorrance	North Carolina	
1978	I. M. Ibrahim	Clemson	
1979	Bruce Arena	Virginia	
1980	John Rennie	Duke	
1981	George Kennedy	Wake Forest	
1982	Joe Grimaldi	Maryland	
1983	John Rennie (2)	Duke	
1984	Bruce Arena (2)	Virginia	
1985	I. M. Ibrahim (2)	Clemson	
1986	Bruce Arena (3)	Virginia	
1987	John Rennie (3)	Duke	
1988	Bruce Arena (4)	Virginia	
1989	Bruce Arena (5)	Virginia	
1990	I. M. Ibrahim (3)	Clemson	
1991	Bruce Arena (6)	Virginia	
1992	George Tarantini	NC State	
1993	I. M. Ibrahim (4)	Clemson	
1994	George Tarantini (2)	NC State	
1995	Bruce Arena (7)	Virginia	
1996	George Gelnovatch	Virginia	
1997	John Rennie (4)	Duke	
1998	Trevor Adair	NC State	
1999	John Rennie (5)	Duke	
2000	Elmar Bolowich	North Carolina	
2001	George Gelnovatch (2)	Virginia	
2002	Jay Vidovich	Wake Forest	
2003	Sasho Cirovski	Maryland	
2004	Jay Vidovich (2)	Wake Forest	
2005	Sasho Cirovski (2)	Maryland	
2006	Jay Vidovich (3)	Wake Forest	
2007	Ed Kelly	Boston College	
2008	Jay Vidovich (4)	Wake Forest	
2009	Jay Vidovich (5)	Wake Forest	
2010	Elmar Bolowich (2)	North Carolina	
2011	Carlos Somoano	North Carolina	
2012	Sasho Cirovski (3)	Maryland	
2013	Bobby Clark	Notre Dame	
2014	Ian McIntyre	Syracuse	
2015	Bobby Muuss	Wake Forest	
2016	Bobby Muuss (2)	Wake Forest	
2017	Bobby Muuss (3)	Wake Forest	
2018	Bobby Muuss (4)	Wake Forest	
2019	Mike Noonan	Clemson	
2020	Jay Vidovich (6)	Pittsburgh	
2021	Jay Vidovich (7)	Pittsburgh	
2022	Ian McIntyre (2)	Syracuse	
2023	Chad Riley	Notre Dame	
2024	Jay Vidovich (8)	Pittsburgh	
2025	George Gelnovatch (3)	Virginia	
2026	Kevin Hudson	SMU	
