= 1984 Clemson Tigers men's soccer team =

Clemson Tigers
1984 season
- Head Coach: I. M. Ibrahim
- Stadium: Riggs Field
- NCAA: 22–4
- ACC: 4–2
- NCAA Tournament: Champions

1984 Atlantic Coast Conference men's soccer standings
	Conf.					Overall
Team	W		L		T	W		L		T
Virginia $	6	–	0	–	0	19	–	3	–	1
Clemson	4	–	2	–	0	22	–	4	–	0
NC State	4	–	2	–	0	14	–	4	–	1
North Carolina	3	–	3	–	0	12	–	7	–	1
Duke	2	–	3	–	1	12	–	5	–	3
Wake Forest	1	–	4	–	1	12	–	7	–	3
Maryland	0	–	6	–	0	7	–	10	–	1
As of December 16, 1984; Rankings from NSCAA

The 1984 Clemson Tigers men's soccer team represented the Clemson University during the 1984 NCAA Division I men's soccer season. The Tigers won their first NCAA title. The Tigers were coached by Dr. I. M. Ibrahim, in his 18th season. They played home games at Riggs Field.

== Schedule ==
Date Time, TV	Rank^{#}	Opponent^{#}	Result	Record	Site City, State
Regular season
September 1*	No. 11	Connecticut	W 5–0	1–0	Riggs Field • Clemson, SC
September 5*	No. 11	Mercer	W 6–1	2–0	Riggs Field • Clemson, SC
September 8*	No. 11	vs. UCLA; Indiana Classic	L 1–2	2–1	Bill Armstrong Stadium • Bloomington, IN
September 9*	No. 11	at Indiana; Indiana Classic	L 3–4	2–2	Bill Armstrong Stadium • Bloomington, IN
September 12*	No. 18	Pfeiffer	W 5–0	3–2	Riggs Field • Clemson, SC
September 16	No. 18	North Carolina	W 2–1	4–2 (1–0)	Riggs Field • Clemson, SC
September 19*	No. 16	Appalachian State	W 6–0	5–2	Riggs Field • Clemson, SC
September 23	No. 16	at Duke	L 0–2	5–3 (1–1)	Koskinen Stadium • Durham, NC
September 26*		Erskine	W 5–2 ^{OT}	6–3	Riggs Field • Clemson, SC
October 3*		Winthrop	W 3–0	7–3	Riggs Field • Clemson, SC
October 7		at Wake Forest	W 3–0	8–3 (2–1)	Winston-Salem, NC
October 10*		USC Spartanburg	W 2–1	9–3	Riggs Field • Clemson, SC
October 14*		South Carolina	W 3–2 ^{OT}	10–3	Riggs Field • Clemson, SC
October 16*	No. 19	Davidson	W 3–0	11–3	Riggs Field • Clemson, SC
October 19*	No. 19	Tampa; Clemson Invitational	W 3–1	12–3	Riggs Field • Clemson, SC
October 21*	No. 19	FIU; Clemson Invitational	W 3–0	13–3	Riggs Field • Clemson, SC
October 24*	No. 18	at Furman	W 3–0	14–3	Greenville, SC
October 28	No. 18	Maryland	W 5–0	15–3 (3–1)	Riggs Field • Clemson, SC
November 2	No. 16	Virginia	L 0–2	15–4 (3–2)	Riggs Field • Clemson, SC
November 4*	No. 16	Vanderbilt	W 8–0	16–4	Riggs Field • Clemson, SC
November 11	No. 16	NC State	W 3–2	17–4 (4–2)	Riggs Field • Clemson, SC
NCAA Tournament
November 18*	No. 9	at NC State	W 2–1	18–4	Raleigh, NC
November 25*	No. 9	Alabama A&M	W 3–1	19–4	Riggs Field • Clemson, SC
December 1*	No. 9	at Virginia	W 1–0	20–4	Charlottesville, VA
December 9*	No. 9	at UCLA	W 4–1	21–4	Drake Stadium • Los Angeles, CA
December 16*	No. 9	vs. Indiana	W 2–1	22–4	Kingdome • Seattle, WA
*Non-conference game. ^{#}Rankings from United Soccer Coaches. (#) Tournament seedings in parentheses.
