= Hindson =

Hindson is a surname. Notable people with the surname include:

- Alice Hindson (1896–1984), English weaver
- Clarrie Hindson (1907–2002), Australian rules footballer
- Ed Hindson (born 1944), American Christian evangelist
- James Hindson (born 1973), English cricketer
- Matthew Hindson (born 1968), Australian composer
- Phil Hindson, Scottish footballer and manager
