= 2023 Clemson Tigers men's soccer team =

American college soccer season

2023 Clemson Tigers men's soccer

ACC tournament champions

NCAA Tournament, Champions
- Conference: Atlantic Coast Conference
- Record: 15–3–5 (4–2–2 ACC)
- Head coach: Mike Noonan (14th season)
- Assistant coaches: Philip Jones (11th season); Camilo Rodriguez (8th season); Malick Mbaye (1st season)
- Home stadium: Riggs Field

2023 ACC men's soccer standings
	Conf.					Overall
Team	W		L		T	W		L		T
Atlantic
No. 15 Wake Forest +	4	–	1	–	3	11	–	3	–	5
No. 1 Clemson ‡	4	–	2	–	2	15	–	3	–	5
No. 25 Syracuse +	2	–	1	–	5	9	–	5	–	7
No. 24 Louisville +	2	–	4	–	2	12	–	6	–	3
NC State	1	–	5	–	2	6	–	9	–	3
Boston College	0	–	5	–	3	3	–	9	–	5
Coastal
No. 2 Notre Dame +	6	–	0	–	2	13	–	3	–	6
No. 13 Virginia +	5	–	2	–	1	11	–	4	–	4
No. 20 Duke+	4	–	3	–	1	11	–	4	–	3
No. 6 North Carolina +	2	–	3	–	3	11	–	3	–	7
Pittsburgh +	2	–	3	–	3	6	–	7	–	4
Virginia Tech	2	–	5	–	1	4	–	9	–	4
‡ – ACC tournament champion + – Also invited to the 2023 NCAA tournament; As of December 12, 2023; Rankings from United Soccer Coaches; Source: The ACC

The 2023 Clemson Tigers men's soccer team represented Clemson University during the 2023 NCAA Division I men's soccer season. They were led by head coach Mike Noonan, in his fourteenth season. They played their home games at Riggs Field. This was the team's 63rd season playing organized men's college soccer and their 36th playing in the Atlantic Coast Conference.

The Tigers started the season with a loss to UCF and a draw with UNC Wilmington. These results saw them fall from their preseason ranking of ninth to unranked. They followed up with non conference wins over rival South Carolina and Presbyterian. They started conference play with a loss to Notre Dame. They would go on to win their next three games, including a conference match-up with Duke. Their first conference loss came at Wake Forest on September 22. That match would be the last match that Clemson would lose for the remainder of the season. They won three straight games before drawing at Syracuse. They would follow that with a win and a draw to close out the regular season with a 9–3–3 overall record and a 4–2–2 ACC record. They were runners up in the Atlantic Division.

The Tigers were the fourth overall seed in the ACC Tournament. They defeated fifth seed Duke in penalties in the Quarterfinals and ninth seed Louisville in the Semifinals to reach the Final. There they faced off against seventh seed North Carolina. The match finished 1–1 and Clemson prevailed in another penalty shootout to win their fifth ACC tournament title. The tournament victory earned Clemson the ACC's automatic bid to the NCAA Tournament. There they were selected as the ninth overall seed. They defeated Charlotte in the second round, eighth seed New Hampshire in the third round, and sixteenth seed Stanford in the Quarterfinals to reach the College Cup. A victory over fifth seed West Virginia saw them reach the national title match against fellow ACC foe Notre Dame. Clemson went on to avenge their regular season loss to Notre Dame and win the title 2–1. The goal allowed in the title match was the only goal allowed by Clemson in the NCAA Tournament. The national title was the fourth in program history and second for head coach Mike Noonan. It was Clemson's second title in three years following their 2021 title.

== Previous season ==
The Tigers finished the season 13–7–1 overall and 3–4–1 in ACC play to finish in fourth place in the Atlantic Division. As the eighth overall seed in the ACC Tournament, they defeated Notre Dame in the First Round, top seed Duke in the Quarterfinals, fourth seed Wake Forest in the Semifinals and became the lowest seed to reach the final in ACC Tournament history. They came up short in the final losing to eventual National Champion Syracuse 2–0. They received an at large bid to the NCAA Tournament and were awarded the sixth overall seed. After a First Round bye, they lost to UCLA in the Second Round to end their National Title defense.

== Player movement ==
=== Players leaving ===
Players Leaving
Name	Number	Pos.	Height	Weight	Year	Hometown	Reason for departure
Trevor Manion	1	GK	6'3"	190	Junior	Phoenixville, Pennsylvania	—
Dawson Malcolm	4	DF	6'3"	190	(redshirt) Freshman	Clover, South Carolina	—
Hamady Diop	5	DF	6'0"	186	Junior	Dakar, Senegal	Selected First Overall in 2023 MLS SuperDraft
Dylan Sullivan	6	MF	5'9"	160	Senior	Wappingers Falls, New York	Graduated
Tim Ströbeck	7	FW	6'0"	165	Sophomore	Hässleholm, Sweden	Transferred to Seton Hall
Elton Chifamba	8	MF	5'9"	145	Sophomore	Blacklick, Ohio	Transferred to Syracuse
Joey Skinner	13	DF	6'2"	155	Sophomore	Charlotte, North Carolina	Selected thirteenth overall in 2023 MLS SuperDraft
Derek Waleffe	16	MF	5'11"	167	Graduate Student	Madison, Wisconsin	Graduated
Alvaro Gomez	18	MF	5'8"	150	Senior	Toledo, Spain	Graduated
MJ Petry	24	MF	6'3"	155	Freshman	Mount Pleasant, South Carolina	—
Isaiah Ried	27	FW	5'10"	150	Senior	Rock Hill, South Carolina	Graduated; Selected thirty fourth overall in 2023 MLS SuperDraft
Ben Erkens	28	DF	6'2"	180	Junior	Greenville, South Carolina	—

=== Players arriving ===
==== Incoming transfers ====
Incoming transfers
Name	Number	Pos.	Height	Weight	Year	Hometown	Previous school
Joran Gerbet	6	MF	5'11"	160	Junior	Valence, France	Oregon State
Alex Meinhard	15	FW	6'0"	178	Senior	Tartu, Estonia	Tulsa
Jackson Wrobel	23	MF	5'9"	162	Junior	Madison, Alabama	Wofford
Gael Gibert	27	DF	6'0"	184	Graduate Student	Theirs, France	Oregon State

==== Recruiting class ====
Name	Nat.	Hometown	Club	TDS Rating
Mathieu Brick; DF	USA	Oviedo, Florida	Atlanta United 2	4/5 stars
Logan Brown; GK	USA	Spartanburg, South Carolina	Charlotte FC Academy	3/5 stars
Mason Jimenez; MF	USA	San Diego, California	Albion SC	3/5 stars
Matthias Leib; DF	USA	Birmingham, Alabama	Briarwood Christian School	3/5 stars
Pape Mar Boye; DF	SEN	Dakar, Senegal	N/A	3/5 stars

== Squad ==
=== Roster ===
As of January 12, 2024

Note: Flags indicate national team as defined under FIFA eligibility rules; some limited exceptions apply. Players may hold more than one non-FIFA nationality.

No.	Pos.	Nation	Player
0	GK	USA	Patrick Donovan
1	GK	GHA	Joseph Andema
2	DF	SEN	Pape Mar Boye
3	DF	USA	Adam Lundegard
5	DF	USA	Terry Watson
6	DF	FRA	Joran Gerbet
7	FW	USA	Isaiah Easley
9	MF	ESP	Mohamed Seye
10	MF	SEN	Osmane Sylla
11	MF	USA	Brandon Parrish
12	DF	USA	Enrique Montana III
13	DF	USA	Mathieu Brick
14	DF	USA	Titus Sandy Jr
15	FW	EST	Alex Meinhard
16	MF	USA	Mason Jimenez
17	FW	USA	Tyler Trimnal

No.	Pos.	Nation	Player
18	DF	USA	Matthias Leib
19	FW	USA	James Kelly
20	DF	USA	Shawn Smart
21	MF	USA	Noah Behrmann
22	GK	USA	Aiden Hampton
23	MF	USA	Jackson Worbel
25	MF	USA	Nathan Richmond
26	FW	ITA	Marco Garcia
27	DF	FRA	Gael Gibert
28	DF	ENG	Will Cain
29	DF	BRA	Rafael Borlido
30	FW	USA	Remi Okunlola
31	GK	USA	Logan Brown
33	DF	FRA	Arthur Duquenne
34	MF	USA	Samir Dishnica

=== Team management ===
Position	Staff
Athletic Director	(United States) Graham Neff
Head coach	(United States) Mike Noonan
Associate head coach	(England) Philip Jones
Assistant Coach	(Colombia) Camilo Rodriguez
Assistant Coach	(Senegal) Malick Mbaye
Director of Operations	(United States) Rob Thompson

== Schedule ==
Date Time, TV	Rank^{#}	Opponent^{#}	Result	Record	Site (Attendance) City, State
Exhibition
August 12*	No. 9	Coker	None Reported	–	Riggs Field; Clemson, SC
August 15*	No. 9	Furman	None Reported	–	Riggs Field; Clemson, SC
August 19*	No. 9	at Georgia State	None Reported	–	GSU Soccer Field; Atlanta, GA
Regular season
August 24*; 7:00 p.m.	No. 9	UCF	L 1–2	0–1–0	Riggs Field (4,090); Clemson, SC
August 28*; 7:00 p.m.	No. 9	UNC Wilmington	T 1–1	0–1–1	Riggs Field (1,575); Clemson, SC
September 1*; 7:00 p.m.		South Carolina; Rivalry	W 2–0	1–1–1	Riggs Field (4,573); Clemson, SC
September 5*; 7:00 p.m.		Presbyterian	W 6–0	2–1–1	Riggs Field (1,465); Clemson, SC
September 9; 7:00 p.m.		at No. 20 Notre Dame	L 2–3	2–2–1 (0–1–0)	Alumni Stadium (1,703); Notre Dame, IN
September 12*; 7:00 p.m.		at South Florida	W 3–2	3–2–1	Corbett Stadium (1,239); Tampa, FL
September 15; 7:00 p.m.		No. 8 Duke	W 2–0	4–2–1 (1–1–0)	Riggs Field (2,953); Clemson, SC
September 19*; 7:00 p.m.		Gardner–Webb	W 7–0	5–2–1	Riggs Field (1,173); Clemson, SC
September 22; 7:00 p.m.		at No. 14 Wake Forest	L 0–1	5–3–1 (1–2–0)	Spry Stadium (2,528); Winston-Salem, NC
September 29; 7:00 p.m.		Virginia Tech	W 2–1	6–3–1 (2–2–0)	Riggs Field (2,876); Clemson, SC
October 3*; 7:00 p.m.		Winthrop	W 4–1	7–3–1	Riggs Field (1,005); Clemson, SC
October 6; 7:00 p.m.		No. 21 Louisville	W 4–0	8–3–1 (3–2–0)	Riggs Field (2,575); Clemson, SC
October 15; 1:00 p.m.	No. 21	at No. 10 Syracuse	T 1–1	8–3–2 (3–2–1)	SU Soccer Stadium (1,612); Syracuse, NY
October 20; 6:00 p.m.	No. 15	Boston College	W 6–0	9–3–2 (4–2–1)	Riggs Field (2,470); Clemson, SC
October 27; 7:00 p.m.	No. 10т	at NC State	T 1–1	9–3–3 (4–2–2)	Dail Soccer Field (1,289); Raleigh, NC
ACC tournament
November 5*; 6:00 p.m., ACCN	(4) No. 14	(5) No. 8 Duke; Quarterfinals	T 3–3 (4–1 PKs) ^{2OT}	9–3–4	Riggs Field (2,061); Clemson, SC
November 8*; 8:00 p.m., ACCN	(4) No. 14	(9) Louisville; Semifinals	W 5–1	10–3–4	Riggs Field (3,785); Clemson, SC
November 12; 12:00 p.m., ESPNU	(4) No. 14	vs. (7) North Carolina; Final	T 1–1 (5–3 PKs) ^{2OT}	10–3–5	WakeMed Soccer Park (2,318); Cary, NC
NCAA tournament
November 19*; 6:30 p.m., ESPN+	(9) No. 14	Charlotte; Second Round	W 3–0	11–3–5	Riggs Field (2,897); Clemson, SC
November 25*; 5:00 p.m., ESPN+	(9) No. 14	at (8) No. 10 New Hampshire; Third Round	W 1–0	12–3–5	Wildcat Stadium (3,745); Durham, NH
December 2*; 2:00 p.m., ESPN+	(9) No. 14	(16) Stanford; Quarterfinals	W 2–0	13–3–5	Riggs Field (5,411); Clemson, SC
December 8*; 6:00 p.m., ESPN+	(9) No. 14	vs. (5) No. 5 West Virginia; Semifinals	W 1–0	14–3–5	Lynn Stadium (3,853); Louisville, KY
December 11*; 6:00 p.m., ESPNU	(9) No. 14	vs. (2) No. 4 Notre Dame; Final	W 2–1	15–3–5	Lynn Stadium (4,449); Louisville, KY
*Non-conference game. ^{#}Rankings from United Soccer Coaches. (#) Tournament seedings in parentheses. All times are in Eastern.

== Goals Record ==
Rank	No.	Nat.	Po.	Name	Regular season	ACC Tournament	NCAA Tournament	Total
1	10	(Senegal)	MF	Ousmane Sylla	7	3	3	13
2	15	(Estonia)	FW	Alex Meinhard	6	1	0	7
3	9	(Spain)	MF	Mohamed Seye	5	0	0	5
3	17	(United States)	FW	Tyler Trimnal	2	2	1	5
3	25	(United States)	MF	Nathan Richmond	5	0	0	5
6	11	(United States)	MF	Brandon Parrish	2	0	2	4
6	27	(France)	DF	Gael Gibert	2	1	1	4
8	6	(France)	DF	Joran Gerbet	3	0	0	3
8	7	(United States)	FW	Isaiah Easley	2	1	0	3
8	30	(United States)	FW	Remi Okunlola	2	1	0	3
11	2	(Ghana)	DF	Pape Mar Boye	2	0	0	2
11	23	(United States)	MF	Jackson Worbel	2	0	0	2
11	31	(France)	DF	Arthur Duquenne	1	0	1	2
14	20	(United States)	DF	Shawn Smart	0	0	1	1
Opponent own goal					1	0	0	1
Total					42	9	9	60

== Disciplinary record ==
Rank	No.	Nat.	Po.	Name	Regular Season			ACC Tournament			NCAA Tournament			Total		
Rank	No.	Nat.	Po.	Name	Booked	(yellow card) (yellow-red card)	Sent off (straight red)	Booked	(yellow card) (yellow-red card)	Sent off (straight red)	Booked	(yellow card) (yellow-red card)	Sent off (straight red)	Booked	(yellow card) (yellow-red card)	Sent off (straight red)
1	20	(United States)	DF	Shawn Smart	2	0	1	1	0	0	1	0	0	4	0	1
2	2	(Senegal)	DF	Pape Mar Boye	2	0	0	1	0	0	2	0	0	5	0	0
2	3	(United States)	DF	Adam Lundegard	3	0	0	2	0	0	0	0	0	5	0	0
4	6	(France)	MF	Joran Gerbet	2	0	0	1	0	0	1	0	0	4	0	0
5	9	(Spain)	MF	Mohamed Seye	1	0	0	0	0	0	2	0	0	3	0	0
5	10	(Senegal)	MF	Ousmane Sylla	2	0	0	0	0	0	1	0	0	3	0	0
5	25	(United States)	MF	Nathan Richmond	3	0	0	0	0	0	0	0	0	3	0	0
5	27	(France)	DF	Gael Gibert	2	0	0	0	0	0	1	0	0	3	0	0
5	33	(France)	DF	Arthur Duquenne	2	0	0	0	0	0	1	0	0	3	0	0
10	7	(United States)	FW	Isaiah Easley	2	0	0	0	0	0	0	0	0	2	0	0
10	8	(United States)	MF	Elton Chifamba	2	0	0	0	0	0	0	0	0	2	0	0
10	11	(United States)	MF	Brandon Parrish	0	0	0	0	0	0	2	0	0	2	0	0
10	17	(United States)	FW	Tyler Trimnal	1	0	0	1	0	0	0	0	0	2	0	0
14	1	(Ghana)	GK	Joseph Andema	0	0	0	0	0	0	1	0	0	1	0	0
14	12	(United States)	DF	Enrique Montana	1	0	0	0	0	0	0	0	0	1	0	0
14	15	(Estonia)	FW	Alex Meinhard	1	0	0	0	0	0	0	0	0	1	0	0
14	19	(United States)	FW	James Kelly	1	0	0	0	0	0	0	0	0	1	0	0
14	23	(United States)	MF	Jackson Worbel	1	0	0	0	0	0	0	0	0	1	0	0
14	28	(England)	DF	Will Cain	0	0	0	1	0	0	0	0	0	1	0	0
14	30	(United States)	FW	Remi Okunlola	1	0	0	0	0	0	0	0	0	1	0	0
Team					1	0	0	0	0	0	0	0	0	1	0	0
Total					30	0	1	7	0	0	11	0	0	48	0	1

== Awards and honors ==
Recipient	Award	Date	Ref.
Alex Meinhard	Pre-Season Hermann Trophy Watchlist	August 24, 2023	
Ousmane Sylla	Pre-Season All-ACC Team	August 26, 2023	
Ousmane Sylla	ACC Offensive Player of the Week	October 10, 2023	
Ousmane Sylla	All-ACC First Team	November 8, 2023	
Brandon Parrish	All-ACC Second Team	November 8, 2023	
Joran Gerbet	All-ACC Third Team	November 8, 2023	
Pape Mar Boye	All-ACC Third Team	November 8, 2023	
Nathan Richmond	All-ACC Third Team	November 8, 2023	
Pape Mar Boye	All-ACC Freshman Team	November 8, 2023	
Ousmane Sylla	ACC Tournament MVP	November 12, 2023	
Gael Gerbet	ACC All-Tournament Team	November 12, 2023	
Ousmane Sylla	ACC All-Tournament Team	November 12, 2023	
Joran Gerbet	ACC All-Tournament Team	November 12, 2023	
Alex Meinhard	ACC All-Tournament Team	November 12, 2023	
Ousmane Sylla	NCAA Tournament Offensive MVP	December 11, 2023	
Pape Mar Boye	NCAA Tournament Defensive MVP	December 11, 2023	
Ousmane Sylla	Hermann Trophy	January 5, 2024	

== 2024 MLS Super Draft ==
Player	Team	Round	Pick #	Position
Brandon Parrish	D.C. United	2	36	MF
Ousmane Sylla	Houston Dynamo	2	55	MF
Nathan Richmond	Charlotte FC	3	70	MF

== Rankings ==
Ranking movements Legend: ██ Increase in ranking ██ Decrease in ranking — = Not ranked RV = Received votes т = Tied with team above or below ( ) = First-place votes
	Week																
Poll	Pre	1	2	3	4	5	6	7	8	9	10	11	12	13	14	15	Final
United Soccer	9	RV	—	—	RV	RV	RV	21	15	10т	14	14	Not released				1 (7)
TopDrawer Soccer	4	10	18	—	23	24	18	15	12	9	14	11	4	3	2	2	1
