= 1987 Clemson Tigers men's soccer team =

Clemson Tigers
1987 season
- Head Coach: I. M. Ibrahim
- Stadium: Riggs Field
- NCAA: 18–5–1
- ACC: 1–4–1
- NCAA Tournament: Champions

1987 Atlantic Coast Conference men's soccer standings
	Conf.					Overall
Team	W		L		T	W		L		T
Virginia	5	–	0	–	1	17	–	3	–	2
Duke	4	–	1	–	1	13	–	5	–	1
Maryland	3	–	2	–	1	9	–	6	–	5
North Carolina $	3	–	3	–	0	20	–	5	–	0
Clemson	1	–	4	–	1	18	–	5	–	1
Wake Forest	1	–	4	–	1	5	–	13	–	2
NC State	1	–	4	–	1	13	–	6	–	2
† ACC Tournament winner As of December 6, 1987; Rankings from NSCAA

The 1987 Clemson Tigers men's soccer team represented Clemson University during the 1987 NCAA Division I men's soccer season. The Tigers won their second NCAA title. The Tigers were coached by I. M. Ibrahim, in his 21st season. They played home games at Riggs Field.

== Schedule ==
Date Time, TV	Rank^{#}	Opponent^{#}	Result	Record	Site City, State
Regular season
September 1*	No. 20	UNC Asheville	W 8–0	1–0	Riggs Field • Clemson, SC
September 6*	No. 20	UNC Greensboro	W 3–0	2–0	Riggs Field • Clemson, SC
September 9*	No. 20	College of Charleston	W 2–0 ^{OT}	3–0	Riggs Field • Clemson, SC
September 13	No. 20	at North Carolina	L 1–2	3–1 (0–1)	Fetzer Field • Chapel Hill, NC
September 16*		Georgia State	W 3–2	4–1	Riggs Field • Clemson, SC
September 20		Wake Forest	W 3–1	5–1 (1–1)	Riggs Field • Clemson, SC
September 23*		Furman	W 3–1	6–1	Riggs Field • Clemson, SC
September 27		Duke	L 0–2	6–2 (1–2)	Riggs Field • Clemson, SC
October 2*		George Mason; Clemson Invitational	W 2–0	7–2	Riggs Field • Clemson, SC
October 4*		Saint Louis; Clemson Invitational	W 5–1	8–2	Riggs Field • Clemson, SC
October 7*		Berry	W 1–0	9–2	Riggs Field • Clemson, SC
October 11*		South Carolina	W 2–1	10–2	Riggs Field • Clemson, SC
October 14*	No. 10	Coastal Carolina	W 2–1	11–2	Riggs Field • Clemson, SC
October 18	No. 10	at NC State	T 2–2 ^{OT}	11–2–1 (1–2–1)	Raleigh, NC
October 21*	No. 10	Erskine	W 5–0	12–2–1	Riggs Field • Clemson, SC
October 25	No. 10	at Maryland	L 0–1 ^{OT}	12–3–1 (1–3–1)	College Park, MD
October 28*	No. 12	Presbyterian	W 3–0	13–3–1	Riggs Field • Clemson, SC
November 1	No. 12	at Virginia	L 0–1	13–4–1 (1–4–1)	Charlottesville, VA
ACC Tournament
November 5	No. 12	vs. North Carolina	L 1–2	13–5–1	Duke Soccer Stadium • Durham, NC
NCAA Tournament
November 15*		at Evansville	W 2–1	14–5–1	Evansville, IN
November 22*		at Indiana	W 2–1	15–5–1	Bill Armstrong Stadium • Bloomington, IN
November 29*		at Rutgers	W 3–2	16–5–1	Piscataway, NJ
December 5*		North Carolina	W 4–1	17–5–1	Riggs Field • Clemson, SC
December 6*		San Diego State	W 2–0	18–5–1	Riggs Field • Clemson, SC
*Non-conference game. ^{#}Rankings from United Soccer Coaches. (#) Tournament seedings in parentheses.
