= 1987 ACC tournament =

1987 ACC tournament may refer to:

- 1987 ACC men's basketball tournament
- 1987 ACC women's basketball tournament
- 1987 ACC men's soccer tournament
- 1987 Atlantic Coast Conference baseball tournament
