= Fred Kirchner =

American professor and soccer coach (1909–1997)

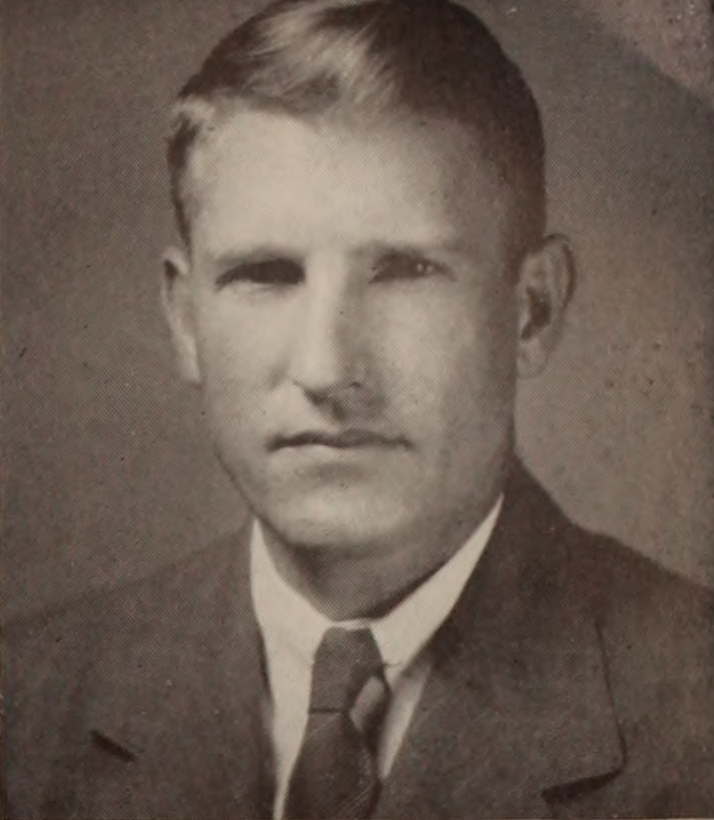
- Kirchner in 1940

Biographical details
- Born: March 7, 1909; Greenville, South Carolina, U. S.
- Died: February 13, 1997 (aged 87); Johnson City, Tennessee, U.S.
- Education: Clemson (BS 1931); Indiana (PhD)

Coaching career (HC unless noted)
- 1934–1940: Clemson

Head coaching record
- Overall: 8–6–4

George Frederick Kirchner (March 7, 1909 – February 13, 1997) was an American college professor and soccer coach. A native of Greenville, South Carolina, Kirchner graduated from Clemson College in 1931 with a degree in mechanical engineering. He remained at Clemson after graduating, working first with the local YMCA and then as the college's director of intramural sports.

In 1934 Clemson began a soccer team and Kirchner was tapped as coach. Kirchner's team played Furman in the first soccer match in the state of South Carolina on February 14, 1934. The soccer team was discontinued after the 1939 season.

Kirchner served in the United States Navy during World War II. He later earned a PhD from Indiana University Bloomington, and was a physical education professor and department head at Appalachian State University and Western Kentucky University, where his wife was a health educator.
