= Phil Hindson =

Scottish footballer and coach

Personal information
- Place of birth: Perth, Scotland

College career
Years	Team	Apps	(Gls)
1995–1998	William Carey Crusaders		

Senior career*
Years	Team	Apps	(Gls)
1993–1994	Arbroath F.C.	1	(0)
1995–1996	Nashville Metros		
1996–1997	Cocoa Expos		
1998	Pensacola Flyers (indoor)		

Managerial career
- 2000–2003: Winthrop Eagles (asst.)
- 2004–2008: Clemson Tigers (asst.)
- 2009: Clemson Tigers
- 2010–2015: UNC Pembroke Braves
- 2016–2020: Winthrop Eagles
- * Club domestic league appearances and goals

Phil Hindson is a Scottish soccer coach and former player.

== Playing career ==
Hindson began his professional playing career with Arbroath. He made one appearance in the Scottish Football League during the 1993–94 season. He then moved to William Carey University in Hattiesburg, Mississippi, where he played for four years, earning All-America honors in 1995. In 2007, Hindson was selected to Carey's Wall of Fame. While at Carey, he played for two USISL Premier League teams, the Nashville Metros in 1995 and 1996, and the Cocoa Expos in 1996 and 1997. He finished his playing career in 1998 with the Pensacola Flyers of the Eastern Indoor Soccer League.

== Coaching career ==
Hindson was assistant coach of the Winthrop Eagles from 2000 until 2003. During this time, the Eagles won the 2002 Big South Conference championship and participated in the 2002 NCAA Division I Men's Soccer Championship, the first tournament appearance for the school. In 2004, he moved to the Clemson Tigers. The Tigers reached the Final Four of the 2005 NCAA Division I Men's Soccer Championship during his stint as assistant coach. For the 2009 season, Hindson was promoted to interim head coach when Trevor Adair stepped down. As head coach, Hindson led Clemson to a 6–12–1 record and a 9th-place finish in the Atlantic Coast Conference.

In 2010, Hindson was hired as the head coach of the Division II UNC Pembroke Braves. Hindson left UNC Pembroke in 2016 to become the head coach of the Winthrop Eagles.

In 2020, Hindson left Winthrop to work in the North Carolina youth soccer system.
