= 1984 NCAA Division I men's soccer tournament =

1984 Men's College Cup

Tournament details
- Country: United States
- Venue(s): Kingdome (Washington (state)) Seattle, Washington
- Teams: 23

Final positions
- Champions: Clemson (1st title)
- Runners-up: Indiana
- Semifinalists: Hartwick; UCLA

Tournament statistics
- Matches played: 22
- Goals scored: 67 (3.05 per match)
- Attendance: 48,469 (2,203 per match)
- Top goal scorer(s): Gary Conner, Clemson (4)

Awards
- Best player: Maxwell Amatasiro, Clemson (offensive); Joe Schmid, Indiana (defensive)

The 1984 NCAA Division I men's soccer tournament was the 26th annual tournament organized by the National Collegiate Athletic Association to determine the national champion of men's collegiate soccer among its Division I members in the United States.

Clemson won their first national title, defeating two-time defending champion Indiana in the championship game, 2–1.

The final was held on December 16 at the Kingdome in Seattle, Washington. All the other games were played at the home field of the higher seeded team.

== Qualifying ==
One team made their debut appearance in the NCAA Division I men's soccer tournament: Syracuse.

== Bracket ==
- Home teams are indicated by * or seed

First round
Akron	2
*	Evansville (pen.)	2
*	Syracuse	1
Hartwick	3
Philadelphia Textile	0
*	Penn State	5
*	NC State	1
Clemson	2
American	2
*	George Mason	1
2	UCLA	2
*	Fresno State	1
San Francisco (2 ot)	2
*	UNLV	1

Second round
1	Indiana	5
Evansville	0
SMU	3
*	Saint Louis	5
*	Columbia	0
Hartwick	1
4	Fairleigh Dickinson	1
Penn State	0
Alabama A&M	1
*	Clemson	3
3	Virginia (pen.)	0
*	American	0
2	UCLA	1
San Francisco	0
Harvard (2 ot)	1
*	Connecticut	0

Quarterfinals
1	Indiana	4
Saint Louis	2
Hartwick	1
4	Fairleigh Dickinson	0
Clemson	1
3	Virginia	0
2	UCLA	2
Harvard	0

Semifinals
1	Indiana	2
Hartwick	1
Clemson	4
2	UCLA	1

Championship
1	Indiana	1
Clemson	2

== Final ==
December 16, 1984

Indiana	1–2	Clemson
Paul DiBernardo	Report	Gary Conner; John Lee 89'

Kingdome, Seattle, Washington
Attendance: 7,926

== See also ==
- 1984 NCAA women's soccer tournament
- 1984 NCAA Division II soccer tournament
- 1984 NCAA Division III men's soccer tournament
- 1984 NAIA men's soccer tournament
