= John Rennie (soccer) =

American soccer coach

Personal information
- Full name: John Rennie
- Date of birth: c. 1944 (age 81–82)
- Place of birth: Chatham, New Jersey

College career
Years	Team	Apps	(Gls)
1963–1965	Temple Owls		

Managerial career
- 1972: Southeastern Massachusetts
- 1973–1978: Columbia Lions
- 1979–2007: Duke Blue Devils

John Rennie is an American college soccer coach. He was a five-time ACC Coach of the Year and the 1982 NSCAA Coach of the Year.

== Career ==
He attended Chatham High School in New Jersey. He then played baseball, soccer, and tennis for the Temple Owls.

In 1972, he was the head men's soccer coach at Southeastern Massachusetts, where his team had a record of 12–4–3. He was the head coach for the Columbia Lions from 1973–1978. His Columbia teams went 4–32–4 from 1973–1975, but in 1978 he led Columbia to an Ivy League Championship and an NCAA Tournament appearance.

During his time at Duke he led the team to five NCAA College Cups in 1982, 1986, 1992, 1995, and 2004. His team's 1986 national championship was Duke's first in any sport.

Rennie finished his career with 454 wins and is one of only eight coaches all-time to get 400 wins with a Division I program.

He was inducted into the North Carolina Soccer Hall of Fame in 2011 and the Duke Athletics Hall of Fame in 2013.

== College head coaching record ==
Record table
Season	Team	Overall	Conference	Standing	Postseason
Southeastern Massachusetts () (1972–1972)
1972	Southeastern Massachusetts	12–4–3			
Southeastern Massachusetts:		12–4–3 (.711)			
Columbia (Ivy League) (1973–1978)
1973	Columbia	1–12–1	0–7–0	8th	
1974	Columbia	0–10–3	0–5–2	7th	
1975	Columbia	3–10–0	1–6–0	8th	
1976	Columbia	6–5–3	1–5–1	7th	
1977	Columbia	9–4–2	3–4–0	6th	
1978	Columbia	13–2–1	6–0–1	1st	NCAA Round of 16
Columbia:		32–43–10 (.435)			
Duke Blue Devils (ACC) (1979–2007)
1979	Duke	10–7–1	1–4–0	5th	
1980	Duke	15–4–3	4–0–2	1st	NCAA Round of 16
1981	Duke	16–4–0	4–2–0	2nd	NCAA First Round
1982	Duke	22–1–2	4–0–2	T–1st	NCAA Runners-up
1983	Duke	18–2–2	4–1–1	2nd	NCAA Round of 16
1984	Duke	12–5–3	2–3–1	5th	
1985	Duke	16–5–0	4–2–0	3rd	NCAA First Round
1986	Duke	18–5–1	3–3–0	T–3rd	NCAA Championship
1987	Duke	13–5–1	4–1–1	2nd	NCAA First Round
1988	Duke	15–6–0	2–4–0	T–5th	
1989	Duke	10–5–4	2–2–2	4th	NCAA First Round
1990	Duke	12–6–1	3–2–1	T–2nd	
1991	Duke	10–9–0	2–4–0	6th	
1992	Duke	15–4–3	3–2–1	3rd	NCAA Semifinals
1993	Duke	15–5–0	4–2–0	T–2nd	NCAA First Round
1994	Duke	15–7–1	3–3–0	T–3rd	NCAA Round of 16
1995	Duke	16–7–1	3–2–1	4th	NCAA Runners-up
1996	Duke	12–7–0	3–3–0	T–2nd	
1997	Duke	15–5–0	4–2–0	T–1st	
1998	Duke	18–4–0	4–2–0	3rd	NCAA First Round
1999	Duke	16–1–3	4–0–2	1st	NCAA Round of 16
2000	Duke	15–6–0	5–1–0	T–1st	NCAA Round of 16
2001	Duke	8–10–1	2–4–0	5th	
2002	Duke	11–8–1	3–3–0	T–4th	NCAA First Round
2003	Duke	8–10–1	2–4–0	T–6th	
2004	Duke	18–6–0	4–3–0	T–3rd	NCAA Semifinals
2005	Duke	12–5–3	3–3–2	T–5th	NCAA Second Round
2006	Duke	18–4–1	5–2–1	T–1st	NCAA Quarterfinals
2007	Duke	11–8–1	4–3–1	T–3rd	NCAA First Round
Duke:		410–161–34 (.706)			
Total:		454–208–47 (.673)			
National champion Postseason invitational champion Conference regular season champion Conference regular season and conference tournament champion Division regular season champion Division regular season and conference tournament champion Conference tournament champion

== See also ==
- List of college men's soccer coaches with 400 wins
