= 1987 ACC men's soccer tournament =

Tournament details
- Country: United States
- Teams: 7

Final positions
- Champions: North Carolina
- Runners-up: NC State

Tournament statistics
- Matches played: 6

1987 Atlantic Coast Conference men's soccer standings
	Conf.					Overall
Team	W		L		T	W		L		T
Virginia	5	–	0	–	1	17	–	3	–	2
Duke	4	–	1	–	1	13	–	5	–	1
Maryland	3	–	2	–	1	9	–	6	–	5
North Carolina $	3	–	3	–	0	20	–	5	–	0
Clemson	1	–	4	–	1	18	–	5	–	1
Wake Forest	1	–	4	–	1	5	–	13	–	2
NC State	1	–	4	–	1	13	–	6	–	2
† ACC Tournament winner As of December 6, 1987; Rankings from NSCAA

The 1987 Atlantic Coast Conference men's soccer tournament was the first edition of the ACC Men's Soccer Tournament. The tournament decided the Atlantic Coast Conference champion and guaranteed representative into the 1987 NCAA Division I Men's Soccer Championship.

== Bracket ==
Quarterfinals
4	North Carolina	2^{OT}
5	Clemson	1
2	Duke	0
7	NC State	3
3	Maryland	2^{OT}
6	Wake Forest	0

Semifinals
1	Virginia	0
4	North Carolina	3
7	NC State	0^{PK}
3	Maryland	0

Finals
4	North Carolina	4^{OT}
7	NC State	3
