= Dylan Sullivan =

American soccer player

Personal information
- Full name: Dylan Sullivan
- Date of birth: January 6, 2001 (age 25)
- Place of birth: Wappingers Falls, New York, United States
- Height: 5 ft 9 in (1.75 m)
- Position: Defensive midfielder

Youth career
- 2016–2019: New York Red Bulls

College career
Years	Team	Apps	(Gls)
2019–2022	Clemson Tigers	38	(0)

Senior career*
Years	Team	Apps	(Gls)
2023–2025	New York Red Bulls II	52	(1)
- * Club domestic league appearances and goals as of November 9, 2025

Dylan Sullivan (born January 6, 2001) is an American professional soccer player who plays as a defensive midfielder.

== Career ==
=== Early career ===
Sullivan joined the New York Red Bulls Academy in 2017. He also played college soccer with Clemson. In 2021 he helped Clemson win the NCAA Division I men's soccer championship. During his college years Sullivan also played for the Hudson Valley Hammers.

=== New York Red Bulls ===
On March 21, 2023, Sullivan signed his first professional contract with New York Red Bulls II.

On 20 March 2024, Sullivan scored his first goal of the season for New York in a 5–1 victory over his hometown club, Hudson Valley Hammers, in the first round of the U.S. Open Cup.

== Career statistics ==
As of match played August 14, 2025

Appearances and goals by club, season and competition
Club	Season	League			U.S. Open Cup		Continental		Other		Total	
Club	Season	Division	Apps	Goals	Apps	Goals	Apps	Goals	Apps	Goals	Apps	Goals
New York Red Bulls II	2023	MLS Next Pro	19	0	0	0	—		0	0	19	0
New York Red Bulls II	2024	MLS Next Pro	21	1	2	1	—		0	0	23	2
New York Red Bulls II	2025	MLS Next Pro	12	0	—		—		0	0	12	0
Career total			52	1	2	1	0	0	0	0	54	2
