= 2023 Syracuse Orange men's soccer team =

American college soccer season

2023 Syracuse Orange men's soccer

NCAA tournament Second Round
- Conference: Atlantic Coast Conference

Ranking
- Coaches: No. 25
- TopDrawerSoccer.com: No. 24
- Record: 9–5–7 (2–1–5 ACC)
- Head coach: Ian McIntyre (14th season)
- Assistant coaches: Jukka Masalin (14th season); Sean Lawlor (4th season)
- Home stadium: SU Soccer Stadium

2023 ACC men's soccer standings
	Conf.					Overall
Team	W		L		T	W		L		T
Atlantic
No. 15 Wake Forest +	4	–	1	–	3	11	–	3	–	5
No. 1 Clemson ‡	4	–	2	–	2	15	–	3	–	5
No. 25 Syracuse +	2	–	1	–	5	9	–	5	–	7
No. 24 Louisville +	2	–	4	–	2	12	–	6	–	3
NC State	1	–	5	–	2	6	–	9	–	3
Boston College	0	–	5	–	3	3	–	9	–	5
Coastal
No. 2 Notre Dame +	6	–	0	–	2	13	–	3	–	6
No. 13 Virginia +	5	–	2	–	1	11	–	4	–	4
No. 20 Duke+	4	–	3	–	1	11	–	4	–	3
No. 6 North Carolina +	2	–	3	–	3	11	–	3	–	7
Pittsburgh +	2	–	3	–	3	6	–	7	–	4
Virginia Tech	2	–	5	–	1	4	–	9	–	4
‡ – ACC tournament champion + – Also invited to the 2023 NCAA tournament; As of December 12, 2023; Rankings from United Soccer Coaches; Source: The ACC

The 2023 Syracuse Orange men's soccer team represented Syracuse University during the 2023 NCAA Division I men's soccer season. It was the 104th season of the university fielding a program. It was the program's 11th season in the Atlantic Coast Conference, and their 14th season with Ian McIntyre as the head coach of the program. The Orange played their home matches at SU Soccer Stadium in Syracuse, New York.

The Orange finished the season with a 9–5–7 overall record and a 2–1–5 record in ACC play to finish in third place in the Atlantic Division. As the sixth seed in the ACC Tournament they defeated eleventh seed NC State in the First Round, and advanced past third seed Virginia via penalties in the Quarterfinals, before falling to seventh seed North Carolina in the Semifinals. They received an at-large bid to the NCAA Tournament. They defeated Boston University in the First Round before losing to eighth seed New Hampshire in the Second Round to end their title defense.

== Background ==
The 2022 season was the most successful season in program history. It was the first time a team from the university reached the NCAA Division I men's soccer tournament championship game going on to defeat #13 Indiana, 7-6 on penalties after a 2-2 draw. It was the program's first national soccer title since 1936.

During the off-season, the team spent time in the UK, practicing against U21 squads for Brighton & Hove Albion, Tottenham Hotspur, Aston Villa, Wolverhampton, and Leicester City. The team was also invited to the College Athletes Day at the White House on June 12, 2023.

On 1 August 2023, the team was ranked #1 in the United Soccer Coaches Top 25 preseason poll.

== Player movement ==
=== Players Leaving ===
Departures
Name	Number	Pos.	Height	Weight	Year	Hometown	Reason for departure
Russell Shealy	1	GK	6'1"	223	(redshirt) Senior	Cartersville, Georgia	Graduated; drafted 52nd overall in the 2023 MLS SuperDraft
Christian Curti	2	DF	6'2"	178	Senior	Ontario, Canada	Graduated
Abdi Salim	3	DF	6'1"	177	Senior	Buffalo, New York	Graduated; drafted 17th overall in the 2023 MLS SuperDraft
Amferny Sinclair	5	MF	6'0"	165	Senior	Alajuela, Costa Rica	Graduated; drafted 45th overall in the 2023 MLS SuperDraft
Julio Fulcar	6	MF	5'9"	174	Graduate Student	Watertown, Massachusetts	Graduated
Curt Calov	7	MF	5'9"	155	Sophomore	Morristown, New Jersey	Transferred to Rutgers
Nathan Opoku	10	FW	6'0"	173	Sophomore	Accra, Ghana	Signed professional contract with Leicester City
Colin Biros	13	MF	5'7"	149	Graduate Student	Jackson, Ohio	Graduated
Levonte Johnson	14	FW	5'10"	185	Senior	Brampton, Ontario	Graduated; drafted 29th overall in the 2023 MLS SuperDraft
Louie Bulger	15	DF	5'10"	157	Senior	Tokyo, Japan	Graduated
Camden Holbrook	18	MF	6'2"	183	Senior	Cary, North Carolina	Graduated
Parker Kump	25	GK	6'0"	181	Sophomore	Fairport, New York	Transferred to Albany
Noah Lechelt	31	MF	5'10"	173	Freshman	Edmonton, Canada	Transferred to Coastal Carolina
Marc Chin	32	DF	6'0"	185	Freshman	Oviedo, Florida	—
Lucas Daunhauer	40	GK	6'3"	176	Graduate Student	Evansville, Indiana	Graduated

=== Players Arriving ===
After departure of many starters to professional ranks, the team welcomed 13 transfer players.

==== Incoming transfers ====
Incoming transfers
Name	Number	Pos.	Height	Weight	Year	Hometown	Previous school
Jason Smith	1	GK	6'1"	173	Junior	Fresno, California	Utah Valley
Pablo Pedregosa	2	DF	6'2"	176	Graduate Student	Villareal, Spain	NC State
Andre Cutler-DeJesus	3	DF	6'1"	176	Junior	Mamaroneck, New York	Marist
Gabriel Mikina	5	DF	6'1"	183	Senior	Toronto, Canada	Niagara
Stephen Hasse	6	MF	5'8"	157	Senior	Godfrey, Illinois	Niagara
Mateo Leveque	7	MF	5'11"	171	Junior	Nice, France	Connecticut
Felipe D'Agostini	11	MF	5'7"	163	Graduate Student	Porto Alegre, Brazil	Oral Roberts
Rodrigo Almeida	14	FW	6'1"	165	Graduate Student	Lisbon, Portugal	Niagara
Daniel Diaz Bonilla	15	FW	6'0"	187	Graduate Student	Vienna, Virginia	Princeton
Nathaniel Edwards	18	MF	5'9"	167	Senior	Brampton, Ontario	Purdue Fort Wayne
Thomas Hutt	25	GK	6'3"	217	Junior	Nutley, New Jersey	Army
Nicholas Kaloukian	32	FW	6'0"	189	Sophomore	Wayne, New Jersey	Michigan
Josh Belluz	33	MF	6'6"	207	Graduate Student	Toronto, Canada	Villanova
Michael Suski	99	FW	5'10"	177	Senior	Avon, Connecticut	Boston College

==== Recruiting class ====
Name	Nationality	Hometown	Club	TDS Rating
Ezra Widman; MF	USA	New York, New York	New England Revolution Academy	3/5 stars

== Squad ==
=== Roster ===
As of January 18, 2024

Note: Flags indicate national team as defined under FIFA eligibility rules; some limited exceptions apply. Players may hold more than one non-FIFA nationality.

No.	Pos.	Nation	Player
0	GK	USA	Sam Coss
1	GK	USA	Jason Smith
2	DF	ESP	Pablo Pedregosa
3	DF	USA	Andre Cutler-DeJesus
4	DF	GER	Noah Singelmann
5	DF	USA	Gabriel Mikina
6	MF	USA	Stephen Hasse
7	MF	FRA	Mateo Leveque
8	MF	USA	Jeorgio Kocevski
9	FW	GER	Julius Rauch
10	MF	ITA	Lorenzo Boselli
11	MF	BRA	Felipe D'Agostini
12	DF	USA	Gavin Wigg
13	MF	USA	Colin Biros
14	FW	POR	Rodrigo Almeida
15	FW	USA	Daniel Diaz Bonilla
16	MF	USA	Michal Gradus

No.	Pos.	Nation	Player
17	MF	USA	Giona Leibold
18	MF	CAN	Nathaniel Edwards
19	DF	SWE	Buster Sjoberg
20	MF	USA	Trevor Carabin
21	DF	USA	Stephen Betz
22	DF	CAN	Ole Oyegunle
23	DF	USA	Jackson Glenn
24	FW	USA	Andrea DiBlasio
25	GK	USA	Thomas Hut
26	MF	USA	Tony Shaw
27	DF	USA	Aidan Arber
28	FW	USA	Francesco Pagano
29	MF	USA	Antonio Pagano
30	GK	CAN	Jahiem Wickham
31	MF	USA	Ezra Widman
33	MF	CAN	Josh Belluz
99	FW	USA	Michael Suski

=== Team management ===
Position	Staff
Athletic director	John Wildhack
Head coach	Ian McIntyre
Associate head coach	Jukka Masalin
Assistant coach	Sean Lawlor

== Schedule ==
Date Time, TV	Rank^{#}	Opponent^{#}	Result	Record	Site (Attendance) City, State
Preseason
August 12*; 7:00 pm	No. 1	Canisius	W 4–0	–	SU Soccer Stadium; Syracuse, NY
August 16*; 7:00 pm	No. 1	St. Bonaventure	W 5–0	–	SU Soccer Stadium; Syracuse, NY
August 19*; 7:00 pm	No. 1	Marist	W 4–0	–	SU Soccer Stadium; Syracuse, NY
Regular season
August 24*; 7:00 pm, ACCNX	No. 1	Providence	W 2–0	1–0–0	SU Soccer Stadium (1,276); Syracuse, NY
August 28*; 7:00 pm, ACCN	No. 1	Binghamton	W 3–0	2–0–0	SU Soccer Stadium (1,422); Syracuse, NY
September 1*; 6:00 pm, BTN	No. 1	at No. 20 Penn State; Rivalry	T 1–1	2–0–1	Jeffrey Field (2,684); University Park, Pennsylvania
September 4*; 7:00 pm, ACCNX	No. 1	Albany	W 1–0	3–0–1	SU Soccer Stadium (1,257); Syracuse, NY
September 8; 8:00 pm, ACCN	No. 4	No. 7 Louisville	T 2–2	3–0–2 (0–0–1)	SU Soccer Stadium (1,832); Syracuse, NY
September 12*; 7:00 pm, ACCNX	No. 7	Siena	Cancelled	3–0–2	SU Soccer Stadium; Syracuse, NY
September 16; 7:00 pm, ACCNX	No. 7	at No. 20 Wake Forest	T 1–1	3–0–3 (0–0–2)	Spry Stadium (2,059); Winston-Salem, NC
September 19*; 7:00 pm, ESPN+	No. 7	at Cornell	L 1–2	3–1–3	Charles F. Berman Field (915); Ithaca, NY
September 22; 7:00 pm, ACCNX	No. 7	Pittsburgh	W 3–2	4–1–3 (1–0–2)	SU Soccer Stadium (1,911); Syracuse, NY
September 29; 7:00 pm, ACCN	No. 7	at No. 21 Duke	L 3–5	4–2–3 (1–1–2)	Koskinen Stadium (1,524); Durham, NC
October 3*; 7:00 pm, ACCNX	No. 18	Colgate	W 1–0	5–2–3	SU Soccer Stadium (784); Syracuse, NY
October 6; 7:30 pm, ACCN	No. 18	No. 13 North Carolina	W 1–0	6–2–3 (2–1–2)	Dorrance Field (2,387); Chapel Hill, NC
October 10*; 7:00 pm, ACCNX	No. 10	Temple	L 1–2	6–3–3	SU Soccer Stadium (352); Syracuse, NY
October 15; 1:00 pm, ESPNU	No. 10	No. 21 Clemson	T 1–1	6–3–4 (2–1–3)	SU Soccer Stadium (1,612); Syracuse, NY
October 18*; 7:00 pm, ACCN	No. 22	Yale	W 2–0	7–3–4	SU Soccer Stadium (487); Syracuse, NY
October 22; 1:00 pm, ACCNX	No. 22	NC State	T 1–1	7–3–5 (2–1–4)	SU Soccer Stadium (320); Syracuse, NY
October 27; 7:00 pm, ACCNX	No. 19	Boston College	T 1–1	7–3–6 (2–1–5)	Newton Campus Soccer Field (517); Chestnut Hill, MA
ACC tournament
November 1; 6:00 pm, ACCN	(6) No. 22	(11) NC State; First Round	W 5–0	8–3–6	SU Soccer Stadium (505); Syracuse, NY
November 5; 2:00 pm, ACCN	(6) No. 24	(3) No. 9 Virginia; Quarterfinals	W 1–1 ^{4-3}	8–3–7	Klöckner Stadium (2106); Charlottesville, VA
November 8; 6:00 pm, ACCN	(6) No. 18	(7) No. 7 North Carolina; Semifinals	L 1–3	8–4–7	SU Soccer Stadium (1570); Syracuse, N.Y.
NCAA tournament
November 16*; 6:00 pm, ESPN+	No. 18	Boston University; First round	W 3–1	9-4-7	SU Soccer Stadium (1321); Syracuse, NY
November 19*; 2:00 pm, ESPN+	No. 18	(8) No. 10 New Hampshire; Second round	L 0–3	9-5-7	Wildcat Stadium (620); Durham, N.H.
*Non-conference game. ^{#}Rankings from United Soccer Coaches. (#) Tournament seedings in parentheses. All times are in Eastern Time.

== Awards and honors ==
Recipient	Award	Date	Ref.
Giona Leibold	Pre-Season All-ACC Team	August 26, 2023	
Jahiem Wickham	ACC Defensive Player of the Week	October 10, 2023	
Jeorgio Kocevski	ACC Midfielder of the Year	November 8, 2023	
Jeorgio Kocevski	All-ACC First Team	November 8, 2023	
Lorenzo Boselli	All-ACC Third Team	November 8, 2023	
Daniel Diaz Bonilla	ACC All-Tournament Team	November 12, 2023	
Alex Svetanoff	ACC All-Tournament Team	November 12, 2023	

== 2024 MLS Super Draft ==
Player	Team	Round	Pick #	Position
(United States) Jeorgio Kocevski	Orlando City	1	21	MF
(Canada) Olu Oyegunle	Atlanta United	2	33	DF

== Rankings ==
Ranking movements Legend: ██ Increase in ranking ██ Decrease in ranking ( ) = First-place votes
	Week																
Poll	Pre	1	2	3	4	5	6	7	8	9	10	11	12	13	14	15	Final
United Soccer	1 (4)	1 (8)	4	7	7	7	18	10	22	19	22	18	Not released				25
TopDrawer Soccer	1	1	3	6	5	8	13	11	17	19	24	19	21	24	24	24	24
