= Villa St. Jean International School =

Private school in Fribourg, Switzerland from 1903 to 1970

Villa St Jean's coat of arms and motto, "de toute Son Âme", which means "With all his soul" in French.

Villa St. Jean International School, originally named Collège Villa St. Jean, was a private Catholic school in Fribourg, Switzerland from 1903 to 1970.

Prior to its closure it was the final remaining all-boys' boarding school in Switzerland.

== History ==
Founded in Switzerland in 1903, during an upheaval of anti-clericalism in France, as a boarding school for the scions of the French elite, Villa St Jean International School evolved over the decades into an international school educating students from around the world. Deceased illustrious alumni include the aviator and author Antoine de Saint-Exupéry (who attended with his younger brother), considered by many among the greatest French writers of the 20th century, and Prince Alphonse, Duke of Anjou and Cádiz, a 20th-Century claimant to both the French and Spanish thrones who served as both President of the Spanish Olympic Committee and Spanish Ambassador to Sweden. During the Second World War, the nephews of Charles de Gaulle were enrolled under pseudonyms to protect them from the Germans. Among prominent alumni living today are Juan Carlos I, the recently abdicated King of Spain, the famed soccer coach Anson Dorrance, chocolate entrepreneur, Michael Litton, Turkish historian Selim Deringil, and Indonesian photographer Rio Helmi.

According to tradition, the school's founder, François Kieffer. a Catholic priest of the Marianist teaching order, consciously modeled Villa St Jean on Rugby School, then as now an eminent English public school (private school in American parlance), noted at the time for intellectual rigour and rugged sportsmanship.

Fr Kieffer built his school on a secluded clifftop bluff, surrounded on three sides by the sinuous Saane/Sarine River, and bordered on the fourth by the quiet neighborhoods abutting the Boulevard de Pérolles, a main thoroughfare leading out of the medieval Swiss burg of Fribourg, considered one of the most beautiful cities in the country.

A 1911 bird's-eye view of the campus.

In her biography of Saint-Exupéry, author Stacy Schiff described the campus as a "tidy red-roofed village unto itself" overlooking "sleepy" Fribourg. Ms Schiff's evocation of the self-contained, red-roofed village is quite accurate, but the campus did not overlook the city so much as it was perched on a flat, wooded plateau, nestled in an elbow high above the Sarine River, which over the eons had carved the bluff's curling cliffs. At its edges, in the woods beyond the unmarked perimeter of the campus, the plateau, now the site of the Swiss lycée Collège St Croix, gives way to those cliffs which fall 200 feet to the winding Saane/Sarine River below.

Despite their architectural and historical significance, most of the campus buildings were razed in 1981, a travesty which would not have been permitted under more recently enacted Swiss architectural preservation laws. Apart from a wooden-roofed outdoor basketball pavilion, the only building that was left standing, and which still stands today, is Gallia Hall, which served as the principal classroom and laboratory building. It is commonly accepted, although not definitively proven, that Benito Mussolini, who spent a period during his youth as a construction worker living and working in Switzerland, contributed to the building of the Gallia.

Buildings near the northern end of the campus in 1909 with students playing in the foreground.

Villa St Jean, under the guidance of the Marianist brothers and priests who founded and administered it, was remarkable among elite Swiss boarding schools for its ability to reinvent itself as required by changing times. Before the Second World War the school was distinctly Gallic in character, a pensionnat (boarding school) educating mostly French aristocrats, many of whom today recall its sometimes strict ascetism. In the decades after the War, Villa St Jean was transformed, and by a decade and a half after the war's end the school had become a metropolitan international institution, teaching principally a U.S. high school curriculum to a student body gathered from Europe, the Americas, the Near and Far East, and conferring on its graduates either a U.S. high school diploma or a Swiss or French baccalaureate degree, as appropriate to the individual student. The principal year of transition from French to the United States style curriculum was 1962.

The notion of looking on at life has always been hateful to me. What am I if I am not a participant? In order to be, I must participate. –Saint Exupéry

During its incarnation as an international school, although nominally a Catholic institution, the Marianists administering Villa St Jean hired lay faculty and staff without reference to religious affiliation, and admitted students on the same basis. Consequently, the student body was a diverse religious mix of Catholics and Protestants, Muslims and Buddhists, consistent with its international character. Yet, despite this ability to adapt and change, like so many other boarding schools in Switzerland at that time, Villa St Jean was ultimately unable to weather the changes of the late 1960s, and it closed its doors permanently in 1970.

The Villa, as seen from the soccer field.

The students, as noted above a diverse mix of nationalities and character, lived in three main dormitory buildings, Ormes, Sapinière and Bossuet and attended classes in the aforementioned Gallia Hall. Other functions were housed in other campus buildings. During the winter, the academic calendar was adjusted to accommodate the ski season at nearby Swiss resorts such as Chateau d'Oex, Gstaad, and Zermatt and ski competition with other international schools.

Villa students, c. 1966.

Interior view of chapel and aerial view of campus, pre-WWI

In historical terms, Villa St. Jean, at the end, was one of the last all-male boarding schools. The contrast with the culture of the United States at the end of the 1960s made for jarring adjustment for many Villa St. Jean graduates, a large number of whom lost contact with their classmates during subsequent college years and were only reunited some years after college graduation.

The Marianist creed for the school and its students was "the Whole Man." Auguring the upheaval that a year later would seize colleges and universities in Europe and North America and the student "strikes" that would shut down many campuses in the United States, in the spring of 1969, formal classes briefly stopped as students and faculty wrestled with the relevance of the school's culture against the backdrop of dramatic changes in Western culture.

The decision to close Villa St. Jean was made in December 1969, according to Jerry Gregg, a teacher at the school at the time. Months later, in the spring of 1970, four of the school's six younger Marianist teachers—Cyril Boschert, Werner Dobner, Fred Fuchs and Mr. Gregg—left the order. Other Marianists — including the school's headmaster, Brother Patrick Moran, S.M., the Rev. James Mueller, S.M. and others — returned to the United States. When the school closed, lay faculty and staff took positions at other institutions in Europe and the United States.

== Notable students ==
- Juan Carlos I (King of Spain)
- Antoine de Saint-Exupéry (author of The Little Prince)
- Anson Dorrance (soccer coach)
- Prince Alphonse, Duke of Anjou and Cádiz (Legitimist claimant to the French and Spanish thrones as "Alphonse II" and "Alfonso XIV")
