= Clemson Tigers men's soccer =

Men's soccer team of Clemson University

- 2026 Clemson Tigers men's soccer team
- Founded: 1934; 92 years ago
- University: Clemson University
- Head coach: Mike Noonan (16th season)
- Conference: ACC; Atlantic Division
- Location: Clemson, South Carolina, US
- Stadium: Historic Riggs Field (capacity: 6,500)
- Nickname: Tigers
- Colors: Orange and regalia
Home	Away

NCAA tournament championships
- 1984, 1987, 2021, 2023

NCAA tournament runner-up
- 1979, 2015

NCAA tournament Semifinals
- 1973, 1976, 1978, 1979, 1984, 1987, 2005, 2015, 2021, 2023

NCAA tournament appearances
- 1972, 1973, 1974, 1975, 1976, 1977, 1978, 1979, 1981, 1982, 1983, 1984, 1985, 1987, 1990, 1991, 1993, 1995, 1997, 1998, 2000, 2001, 2002, 2003, 2005, 2006, 2013, 2014, 2015, 2016, 2017, 2019, 2020, 2021, 2022, 2023, 2024, 2025

Conference tournament championships
- 1998*, 2001*, 2000, 2014, 2020, 2023

Conference regular season championships
- 1972*, 1973*, 1974*, 1975*, 1976*, 1977*, 1978*, 1979*, 1981*, 1982*, 1985*, 1990, 1993, 1998, 2019, 2021

The Clemson Tigers men's soccer team represent Clemson University in the Atlantic Coast Conference of NCAA Division I soccer. The program has won 4 NCAA national championships, 16 Atlantic Coast Conference championships, and hosted 4 Hermann Trophy winners (Bruce Murray in 1987, Wojtek Krakowiak in 1998, Robbie Robinson in 2019, and Ousmane Sylla in 2023).

== History ==
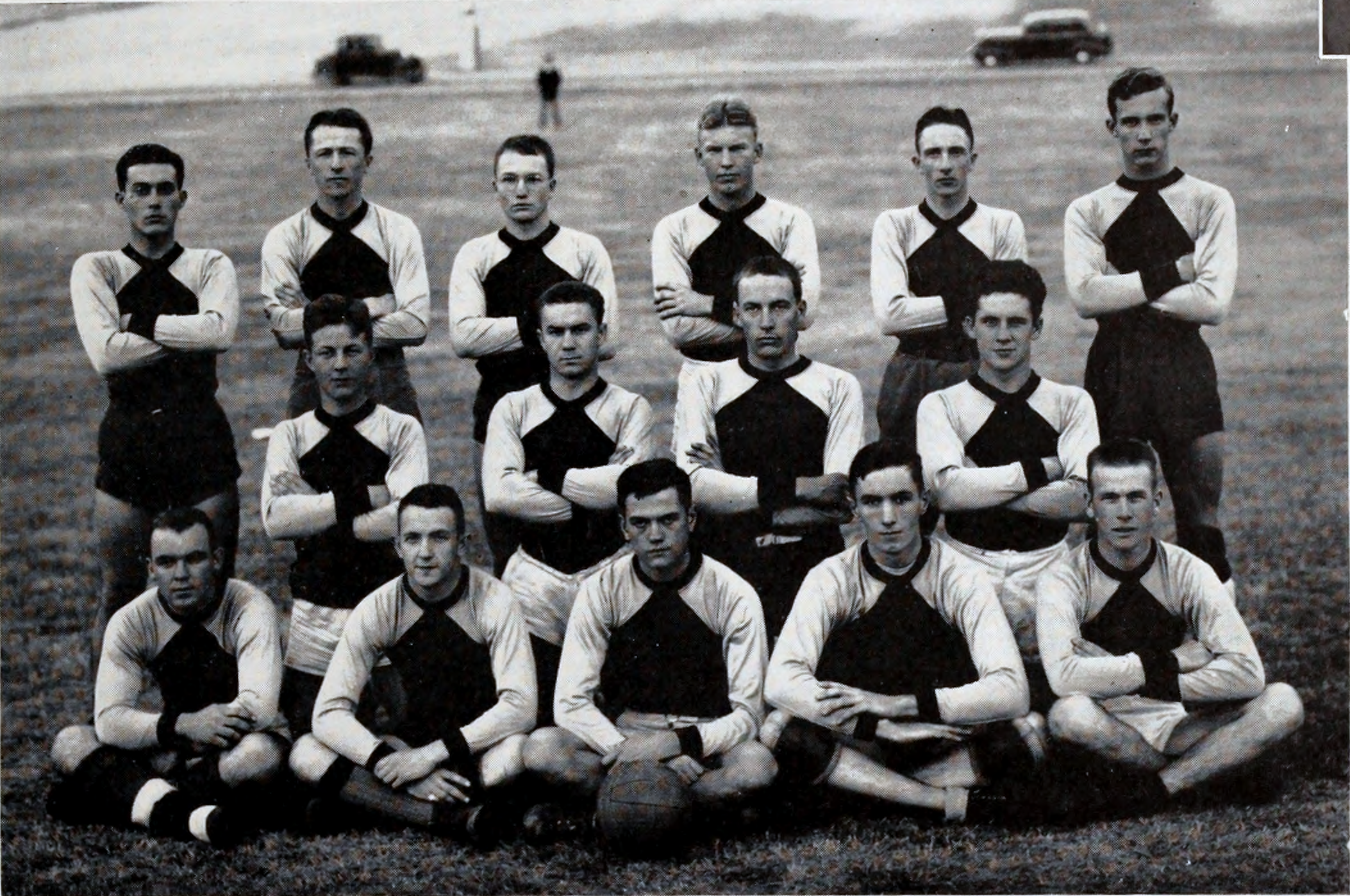
The 1939 Clemson team

Clemson began sponsoring a soccer team in 1934, playing a hybrid schedule of colleges and prep schools. The team was discontinued after the 1939 season. In 1967, the university decided to re-add soccer as a varsity sport. Dr. I. M. Ibrahim, who was a chemistry professor at the time, was chosen to lead the program. In the program's inaugural season, the team posted a 6–5 record. From 1967 to 1971, the Tigers posted four winning seasons overall, but were consistently in the bottom tier of the ACC.

The 1972 season proved to be a breakout year for the Tigers. The Tigers went undefeated in conference play to capture the first of eight straight ACC titles and finished the year with a 13–1–1 record and earned their first trip to the NCAA tournament. The 1973 season would prove to be even more successful, as the Tigers went 16–1 and made it to the semifinals of the NCAA tournament. By the end of the decade, the Tigers had 8 conference titles, 3 trips to the round of 16 in the NCAA tournament, an Elite 8 appearance, 3 Final Four appearances, and finished the 1979 season as national runners-up.

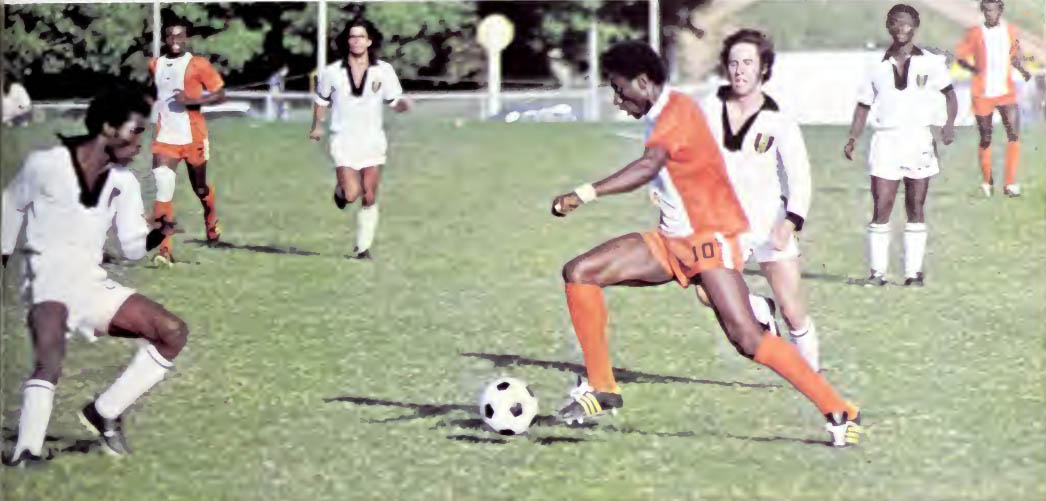
A Clemson match in 1976

Clemson's streak of ACC titles and NCAA appearances was broken during the 1980 season, but the Tigers rebounded with conference titles during the 1981, 1982, and 1985 seasons (Clemson's last before the ACC adopted its tournament format) and five straight appearances in the NCAA tournament. The 1984 season saw the Tigers finally reach the summit of national prominence, as the Tigers went 22–4 against a very tough schedule and won the 1984 National Championship. During the 1984 NCAA Tournament, Clemson had to face the top four seeds in the tournament (Alabama A&M, Virginia, UCLA, and Indiana). After failing to make the NCAA tournament in 1986, the Tigers earned their second national championship during the 1987 season. The Tigers finished the 1987 regular season 13–5–1, but had struggled during conference play. Reportedly, the Tigers were the 23rd team selected for the 24-team NCAA tournament. The Tigers, however, won three straight road games, which included an upset of #1-ranked Indiana (who hadn't lost an NCAA tournament home game prior to the match), and was chosen to host the Final Four at Riggs Field. In the semifinals, the Tigers avenged two earlier losses to North Carolina and, in the championship game, knocked off San Diego State (another surprise finalist). In addition, Bruce Murray won the 1987 Hermann Trophy (the first Clemson player to win the award).

The 1990s saw the first change of head coaches in school history, as Dr. Ibrahim retired after the 1994 season and was replaced by Brown head coach Trevor Adair. The Tigers captured their first ACC Tournament championship in 1998, won 3 ACC regular season titles (1990, 1993, and 1998), and had another player honored with the Hermann Trophy (Wojtek Krakowiak, 1998). The Tigers made 6 appearances in the NCAA tournament, with their best finishes being trips to the Elite 8 in 1997 and 1998.

During the 2001 season, the Tigers captured their second ACC Tournament championship and advanced to the Elite 8. After another Elite 8 run in 2002, the Tigers experienced a down time, failing to advance out of the first round in 2003 and missing the NCAA tournament altogether in 2004. The 2005 squad, however, would make a strong run during the NCAA tournament, advancing to the Final Four for the first time since the 1987 squad's national title.

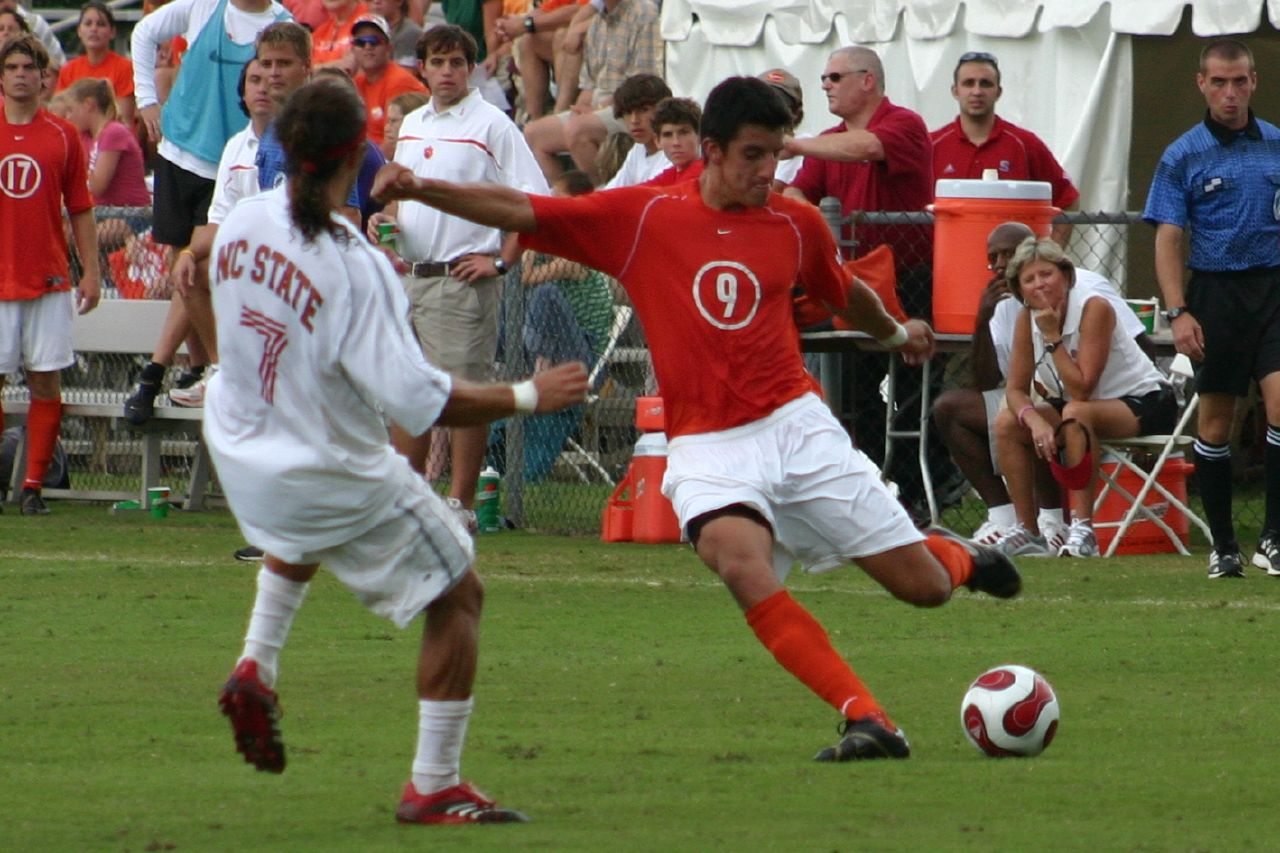
Clemson playing vs. NC State in September 2006

The 2006 team would make the round of 16, falling to eventual runner-up UCLA. The 2008 squad, despite not making the tournament, was one of only two teams in the country to defeat both national champion Maryland and national runner-up North Carolina during the season.

Trevor Adair resigned as head coach of the Tigers on June 16, 2009, two months after being placed on a leave of absence after reportedly assaulting his two daughters during a domestic dispute. Assistant coach Phil Hindson was promoted to interim head coach for the 2009 season, marking only the second change in head coaches in Tiger history. The Tigers struggled through the 2009 season, finishing with a final record of 6–12–1 despite a victory over national champion Virginia during the season.

On January 5, 2010, it was announced that former Brown head coach Mike Noonan was hired as Clemson's fourth head soccer coach. Since Coach Noonan took over, the Tigers have slowly risen back to prominence, returning to the NCAA tournament in 2013 and winning their 14th ACC championship in 2014. In 2015, the Tigers advanced to the finals of the NCAA College Cup for the first time since 1987, falling in the national championship match to Stanford. In 2016, the Tigers finished runners up in the ACC Tournament and advanced to the Quarterfinals of the NCAA Tournament. In 2019, the Tigers would win the ACC Atlantic Division, finished runners up in the ACC tournament, and advanced to the NCAA Tournament Quarterfinals. In addition, Robbie Robinson became the third Clemson player to win the Hermann Trophy. Robinson was drafted first overall in the 2020 MLS SuperDraft, becoming the first Clemson men's soccer player to be drafted first overall. 2021 was a landmark year for the program and coach Noonan as the Tigers won the national title for the third time in program history and had a school-record six players drafted in the MLS Draft. 2023 was also a banner year for the team as they won their second national title in three years. They defeated Notre Dame 2–1 in the title match after not having allowed a goal in the tournament leading up to the final. They also won the ACC Tournament in 2023, with a penalty shoot-out victory over North Carolina. Ousmane Sylla also became the fourth Clemson player to win the Hermann Trophy.

== Players ==
=== Current roster ===
As of August 26, 2025

Note: Flags indicate national team as defined under FIFA eligibility rules; some limited exceptions apply. Players may hold more than one non-FIFA nationality.

No.	Pos.	Nation	Player
0	GK	USA	Aiden Hampton
1	GK	GHA	Joseph Andema
2	DF	ISL	Lukas Magnason
3	DF	FRA	Arthur Duquenne
4	DF	ISL	Olafur Floki Stephensen
5	DF	GHA	Augustine Asante
6	MF	GER	Daniel Bunk
7	FW	GHA	Wahabu Musah
8	MF	GHA	Kwaku Agyabeng
10	MF	GHA	Ransford Gyan
11	MF	JPN	Misei Yoshizawa
12	GK	USA	Justin Ross
14	FW	USA	Cooper Hineline
15	MF	GHA	Abdou Mane
16	MF	USA	Mason Jimenez

No.	Pos.	Nation	Player
17	MF	RSA	Caleb George
18	DF	USA	Matthias Leib
19	FW	USA	James Kelly
20	FW	CRC	Andres Beirute
21	MF	ITA	Gabriel Santuari
22	MF	CRC	Kyle Mattis
23	FW	USA	Duncan Wilson
24	FW	USA	Vitor Geromel
25	MF	USA	Nathan Richmond
26	FW	ITA	Marco Garcia
27	DF	USA	Seamus Streelman
28	FW	USA	Xander Sevian
30	FW	USA	Remi Okunlola
31	GK	USA	Ivan Schmid

=== Notable alumni ===
==== Current professionals ====
As of February 7, 2026

- (Canada) Rob Marinaro (1987–1991) – Currently head coach of Kent State (women)
- (United States) Miles Joseph (1992–1995) – Currently associate head coach with Charlotte FC
- (Jamaica) Wolde Harris (1993-1995) – Currently assistant coach with Toronto FC
- (United States) Jeff Bilyk (1995–1998) – Currently head coach of Charlotte Independence Academy
- (United States) Eric Quill (1996) – Currently head coach of FC Dallas
- Paul Stalteri (1996–1997) – Currently assistant coach with Canada
- (United States) Ian Fuller (1998–2001) – Currently head coach of One Knoxville SC
- Oguchi Onyewu (2000–2001) – Currently assistant sporting director of United States Soccer Federation
- (United States) Stuart Holden (2003–2004) – Currently Fox Sports TV Analyst
- (United States) Cody Mizell (2010–2012) – Currently goalkeeping coach with D.C. United
- (France) Amadou Dia (2011–2014) – Currently with Louisville City FC
- (Rwanda) Phanuel Kavita (2011–2014) – Currently with Birmingham Legion FC
- (United States) Tommy McNamara (2013) – Currently with Brooklyn FC
- (Costa Rica) Diego Campos (2014–2017) – Currently with Bali United F.C.
- (England) Aaron Jones (2014–2016) – Currently with Sutton United F.C.
- (Norway) Iman Mafi (2014–2017) – Currently with FK Jerv
- (United States) Daniel Kuzemka (2017–2019) – Currently with Charleston Battery
- (England) Kimarni Smith (2018–2020) – Currently with One Knoxville SC
- (United States) George Marks (2018–2021) – Currently with Philadelphia Union
- (Kenya) Philip Mayaka (2019–2020) – Currently with Athletic Club Boise
- (Sweden) Oskar Ågren (2019–2021) – Currently with GAIS
- (United States) Dylan Sullivan (2019–2022) – Currently with New York Red Bulls II
- (United States) Callum Johnson (2020–2021) – Currently with One Knoxville SC
- (Senegal) Hamady Diop (2020–2022) – Currently with Rhode Island FC
- (Senegal) Ousmane Sylla (2020–2023) – Currently with Orange County SC
- (United States) Joey Skinner (2022) – Currently with Charlotte Independence
- (United States) Shawn Smart (2022–2023) – Currently with Las Vegas Lights FC
- (Senegal) Pape Mar Boye (2023) – Currently with Phoenix Rising FC
- (France) Joran Gerbet (2023–2024) – Currently with Orlando City SC
- (Ghana) Ransford Gyan (2024–2024) – Currently with New York City FC

== Coaches ==
=== Coaching staff ===
Position	Staff
Athletic director	(United States) Graham Neff
Head coach	(United States) Mike Noonan
Associate head coach	(England) Philip Jones
Assistant coach	(Colombia) Camilo Rodriguez
Assistant coach	(France) Gaye Diadie
Director of Operations	(United States) Rob Thompson

== Seasons ==
Keys

- National Champion ^{†}
- Conference Champions
- NCAA Tournament berth

Season	Head coach	Season results							Tournament results	
Season	Head coach	Overall			Conference				Conference (Note: The Atlantic Coast Conference began holding a tournament in 1987.)	NCAA (Note: The NCAA Division I Men's Soccer Championship began in 1959.)
Season	Head coach	Wins	Losses	Ties	Wins	Losses	Ties	Finish	Conference	NCAA
1934–35	Fred Kirchner	1	2	1	—	—	—	—	—	—
1935	Fred Kirchner	2	2	0	—	—	—	—	—	—
1936	Fred Kirchner	0	0	1	—	—	—	—	—	—
1937	Fred Kirchner	3	0	1	—	—	—	—	—	—
1938	Fred Kirchner	0	0	1	—	—	—	—	—	—
1939	Fred Kirchner	2	2	0	—	—	—	—	—	—
1940–1966: No team
1967	I. M. Ibrahim	6	5	0	1	3	0	4th	—	—
1968	I. M. Ibrahim	9	3	1	1	3	1	5th	—	—
1969	I. M. Ibrahim	5	6	1	4	0	1	5th	—	—
1970	I. M. Ibrahim	8	3	2	1	3	1	6th	—	—
1971	I. M. Ibrahim	8	3	1	1	3	1	5th	—	—
1972*	I. M. Ibrahim	13	1	1	5	0	0	Champion*	—	Round of 16
1973*	I. M. Ibrahim	16	1	0	5	0	0	Champion*	—	Final Four
1974*	I. M. Ibrahim	12	3	0	5	0	0	Champion*	—	Round of 16
1975*	I. M. Ibrahim	13	2	0	5	0	0	Champion*	—	Round of 16
1976*	I. M. Ibrahim	18	2	1	4	0	1	Champion*	—	Fourth Place
1977*	I. M. Ibrahim	16	1	0	5	0	0	Champion*	—	Quarterfinal
1978*	I. M. Ibrahim	18	1	1	4	0	1	Champion*	—	Third Place
1979*	I. M. Ibrahim	16	2	1	5	0	0	Champion*	—	Runner-Up*
1980	I. M. Ibrahim	12	3	2	4	1	1	2nd	—	—
1981*	I. M. Ibrahim	18	2	0	5	1	0	Champion*	—	Round of 16
1982*	I. M. Ibrahim	18	2	1	5	1	0	Champion*	—	Round of 16
1983	I. M. Ibrahim	16	3	2	3	2	1	3rd	—	First round
1984^{†}	I. M. Ibrahim	22	4	0	4	2	0	2nd	—	Champion^{†}
1985*	I. M. Ibrahim	19	3	2	5	1	0	Champion*	—	Round of 16
1986	I. M. Ibrahim	12	6	2	3	3	0	3rd	—	—
1987^{†}	I. M. Ibrahim	18	5	1	1	4	1	5th	First round	Champion^{†}
1988	I. M. Ibrahim	10	7	2	2	4	0	5th	First round	—
1989	I. M. Ibrahim	13	6	1	1	4	1	5th	First round	—
1990	I. M. Ibrahim	16	4	1	4	1	1	1st	First round	First round
1991	I. M. Ibrahim	13	6	2	2	3	1	5th	First Round	First round
1992	I. M. Ibrahim	12	6	4	1	3	2	6th	Final	—
1993	I. M. Ibrahim	18	5	1	5	0	1	1st	Final	Round of 16
1994	I. M. Ibrahim	13	7	1	1	4	1	6th	Quarterfinal	—
1995	Trevor Adair	16	6	1	4	2	0	3rd	First round	Round of 16
1996	Trevor Adair	10	7	2	2	3	1	5th	First round	—
1997	Trevor Adair	11	7	3	2	3	1	5th	First round	Quarterfinal
1998*	Trevor Adair	22	2	0	5	1	0	1st	Champion*	Quarterfinal
1999	Trevor Adair	9	8	2	2	2	2	4th	First round	—
2000	Trevor Adair	14	4	2	2	2	2	4th	First round	Round of 16
2001*	Trevor Adair	19	5	0	4	2	0	T-2nd	Champion*	Quarterfinal
2002	Trevor Adair	13	5	4	2	3	1	6th	Quarterfinal	Quarterfinal
2003	Trevor Adair	9	7	4	2	4	0	6th	First round	First round
2004	Trevor Adair	8	9	1	2	5	0	6th	First round	—
2005	Trevor Adair	15	6	3	2	4	2	7th	Quarterfinal	Final Four
2006	Trevor Adair	13	5	2	3	3	2	T-5th	First round	Round of 16
2007	Trevor Adair	7	11	1	2	6	0	7th	First round	—
2008	Trevor Adair	7	9	2	3	4	1	6th	First round	—
2009	Phil Hindson	6	12	1	2	6	0	9th	Second round	—
2010	Mike Noonan	5	8	4	2	4	2	7th	Quarterfinal	—
2011	Mike Noonan	8	8	2	4	4	0	7th	Quarterfinal	—
2012	Mike Noonan	6	9	5	3	2	3	5th	Semifinal	—
2013	Mike Noonan	11	7	3	5	4	2	T-4th	Semifinal	First round
2014*	Mike Noonan	12	7	3	5	2	1	T-1st Atlantic Division	Champion*	Round of 16
2015	Mike Noonan	17	3	4	6	1	1	2nd Atlantic Division	Semifinal	Runner-Up*
2016	Mike Noonan	14	4	5	4	1	3	3rd Atlantic Division	Runner-Up	Quarterfinal
2017	Mike Noonan	12	6	1	4	4	0	3rd Atlantic Division	Semifinal	Second round
2018	Mike Noonan	7	9	1	2	6	0	6th Atlantic Division	First round	—
2019	Mike Noonan	18	2	2	6	1	1	1st Atlantic Division	Runner-Up	Quarterfinal
2020*	Mike Noonan	14	3	3	7	3	2	1st Atlantic Division	Champion*	Round of 16
2021^{†}	Mike Noonan	16	5	2	5	3	0	1st Atlantic Division	Semifinal	Champion^{†}
2022	Mike Noonan	13	7	1	3	4	1	4th Atlantic Division	Runner-Up	Second round
2023^{†}	Mike Noonan	15	3	5	4	2	2	2nd Atlantic Division	Champion*	Champion^{†}
2024	Mike Noonan	15	3	4	5	2	1	2nd	Runner-Up	Third Round
2025	Mike Noonan	8	6	3	4	2	2	T-4th	First Round	First Round

== Titles ==
=== National ===
- NCAA Division I championships (4): 1984, 1987, 2021, 2023

=== Conference ===
Atlantic Coast Conference

- Tournament (16): 1972, 1973, 1974, 1975, 1976, 1977, 1978, 1979, 1981, 1982, 1985, 1998, 2001, 2014, 2020, 2023

== Bibliography ==
- Blackman, Sam (ed.). "Clemson 2010 Men's Soccer Media Guide". Clemson University.
