= 2023 NCAA Division I men's soccer championship game =

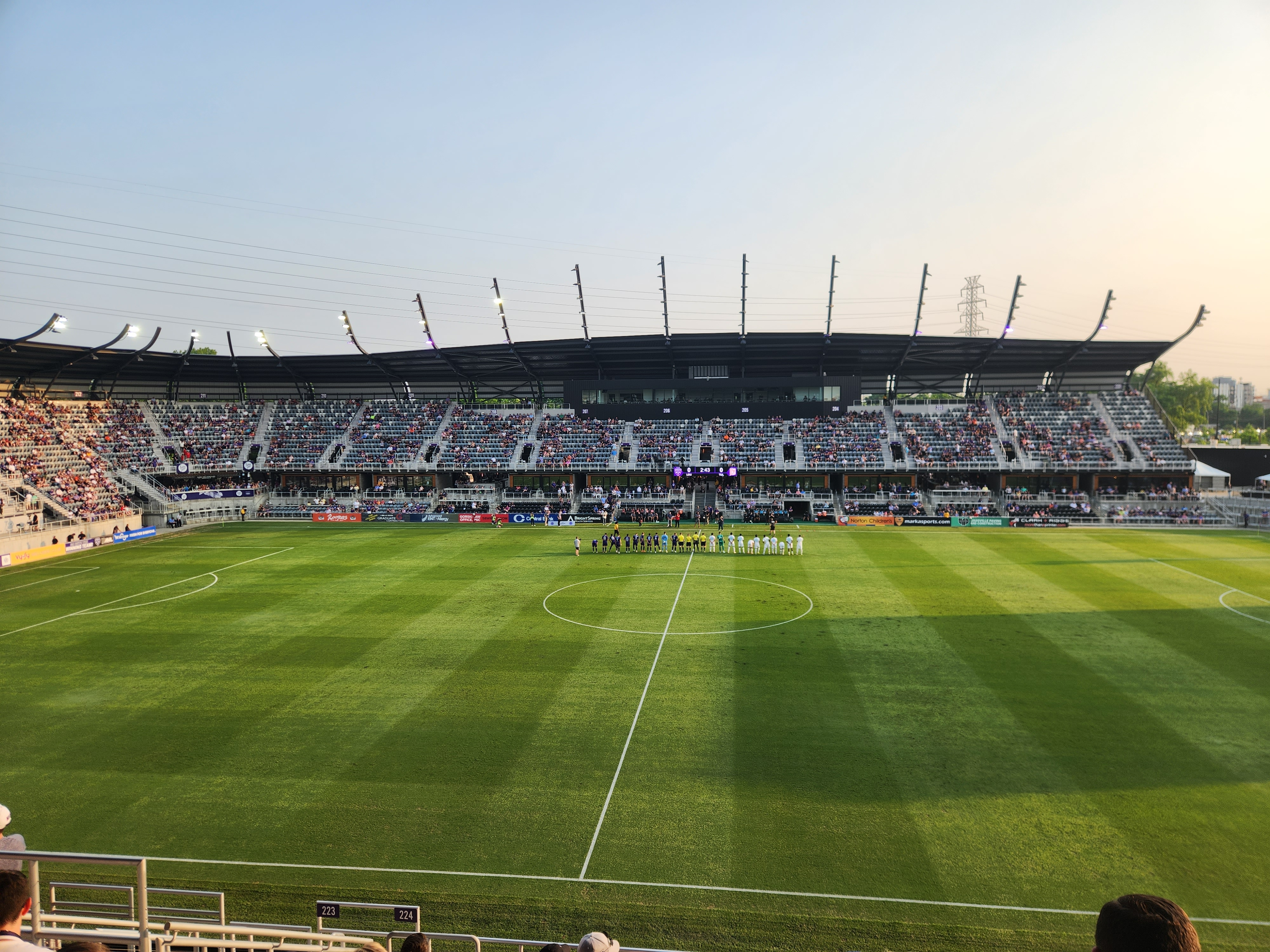
- Lynn Family Stadium hosted the final
- Event: 2023 NCAA Division I men's soccer tournament
Clemson	Notre Dame
ACC	ACC
2	1
- Date: 11 December 2023
- Venue: Lynn Family Stadium, Louisville, Kentucky, U.S.
- Referee: Dimitar Chavdarov
- Attendance: 4,449

The 2023 NCAA Division I men's soccer championship game (also known as the 2023 NCAA Division I Men's College Cup) was played on December 11, 2023, at Lynn Family Stadium in Louisville, Kentucky. The match determined the winner of the 2023 NCAA Division I men's soccer tournament, the national collegiate soccer championship in the United States. This was the 65th edition of the oldest active competition in United States college soccer.

The match featured Clemson University, which played its 6th final, and University of Notre Dame, which made its 2nd appearance in the final. Clemson defeated Notre Dame 2–1 to win their forth NCAA soccer title and their 2nd in three years.

== Road to the final ==
The NCAA Division I men's soccer tournament, sometimes known as the College Cup, is an American intercollegiate soccer tournament conducted by the National Collegiate Athletic Association (NCAA), and determines the Division I men's national champion. The tournament has been formally held since 1959, when it was an eight-team tournament. Since then, the tournament has expanded to 48 teams, where every Division I conference tournament champion is allocated a berth.

Clemson (ACC)		Round	Notre Dame (ACC)	
Opponent	Result	NCAA Tournament	Opponent	Result
Bye	—N/a	First round	Bye	—N/a
Charlotte (AAC)	3–0 (H)	Second round	Kentucky (SBC)	2–0 (H)
New Hampshire (AEC)	1–0 (H)	Third round (Sweet 16)	Western Michigan (MVC)	0–0 (4–2 p) (A)
Stanford (Pac-12)	2–0 (A)	Quarterfinals (Elite 8)	Indiana (Big Ten)	1–1 (5–4 p) (A)
West Virginia (SBC)	2–0 (N)	College Cup (Final 4)	Oregon State (Pac-12)	1–0 (A)

== Match details ==
2023 College Cup
11 December 2023
Final

Clemson	2–1	Notre Dame
Parrish 27'; Sylla 70'	Report	Burns 89' (pen.)

Lynn Family Stadium, Louisville, Kentucky
Attendance: 4,449
Referee: Dimitar Chavdarov

Clemson
Notre Dame

GK	1	(Ghana) Joseph Andema
DF	2	(Senegal) Pape Mar Boye	(yellow card) 41'
DF	3	(United States) Adam Lundegard
DF	20	(United States) Shawn Smart		(substituted off) 32' (substituted in) 71' (substituted off) 65'
DF	27	(France) Gael Gibert	(yellow card) 86'
DF	33	(France) Arthur Duquenne		(substituted off) 71' (substituted in) 82'
MF	6	(France) Joran Gerbet	(yellow card) 56'
MF	10	(Senegal) Ousmane Sylla	(yellow card) 89'
MF	11	(United States) Brandon Parrish
FW	15	(Estonia) Alex Meinhard		(substituted off) 41'
FW	17	(United States) Tyler Trimnal		(substituted off) 66'
Substitutions:
FW	30	(United States) Remi Okunlola		(substituted in) 32' (substituted in) 65' (substituted off) 82'
MF	25	(United States) Nathan Richmond		(substituted in) 41'
FW	9	(Spain) Mohamed Seye		(substituted in) 66'
Head Coach:
(United States) Mike Noonan

GK	31	(United States) Bryan Dowd
DF	2	(United States) Mitchell Ferguson	(substituted off) 45' (substituted in) 68'
DF	5	(United States) Kyle Genenbacher
DF	15	(Northern Ireland) Paddy Burns
DF	18	(United States) Josh Ramsey
MF	7	(Republic of Ireland) Ethan O'Brien	(substituted off) 38' (substituted in) 45' (substituted off) 50' (substituted in) 68'
MF	13	(United States) Bryce Boneau	(substituted in) 64'
MF	16	(Ghana) KK Baffour	(substituted in) 50'
FW	21	(United States) Matthew Roou	(substituted in) 72'
FW	9	(England) Eno Nto	(substituted off) 26' (substituted in) 59' (substituted off) 79'
FW	11	(United States) Daniel Russo	(substituted off) 59' (substituted in) 64'
Substitutions:
MF	22	(United States) Nolan Spicer	(substituted in) 26'
MF	6	(United States) Wyatt Lewis	(substituted in) 38' (substituted off) 72' (substituted in) 79'
Head Coach:
(United States) Chad Riley

College Cup MVP
Offensive:
Defensive:

Assistant referees:
Matthew Rodman (United States)
Justin Howard (United States)
Fourth official:
Aaron Hernandez (United States)

Match rules:

- 90 minutes.
- 20 minutes of extra time if necessary.
- Penalty shoot-out if scores still level.
- Unlimited substitutes, may not return if subbed out in the first half; may return unlimited times in the second half.

=== Statistics ===
Overall
	Clemson	Notre Dame
Goals scored	2	1
Total shots	9	15
Saves	4	1
Corner kicks	7	8
Offsides	2	0
Yellow cards	4	0
Red cards	0	0
