= George Tarantini =

Argentine-American soccer coach

Personal information
- Full name: George Tarantini
- Date of birth: 1949
- Place of birth: Italy
- Date of death: September 25, 2019 (aged 70)
- Place of death: Raleigh, North Carolina

Managerial career
- Years: Team
- 1986–2010: NC State

George Tarantini (1949–September 25, 2019) was an Argentine retired men's soccer head coach at North Carolina State University from 1986 to 2010 and posted a 221–190–41 record.

== Personal life ==
Tarantini was born in Italy and raised in Argentina. His brother Alberto Tarantini is a former professional footballer for Argentina, who was on the team when they won the 1978 FIFA World Cup.

== Career ==
Trantini was on a plane to Italy that stopped in New York, and never got back on for the connecting flight. Instead, he worked construction in New York and taught himself English.

Tarantini started his coaching career in 1976 at Arlington High School in LaGrange, New York. From 1977 to 1980, he served as an assistant coach at Dutchess Community College in New York. Tarantini was an assistant coach at North Carolina State from 1982 to 1985.

=== Head men's soccer coach at North Carolina State University ===
He was men's soccer head coach at North Carolina State University from 1986 to 2010.

Tarantini's 1990 North Carolina State team won the ACC championship, and reached the Final Four, before losing to UCLA on penalty kicks. North Carolina State ended the 1990 season with a 17–4–2 record, the best in school history.

Tarantini earned Atlantic Coast Conference Coach of the Year honors in both 1992 and 1994. He also was the NCAA regional coach of the year in 1994. He has directed North Carolina State to eight NCAA Tournament bids. Tarantini has won more games with North Carolina State than any other coach in school history.

After retiring from North Carolina State in 2010, he served as the Assistant Coach for St. David's School in Raleigh until his death in 2019. He died of a heart attack.
