= Marvin Allen (soccer) =

American soccer coach

Personal information
- Full name: E. Marvin Allen Jr.
- Date of birth: January 6, 1915
- Place of birth: Wilmington, North Carolina, U.S.
- Date of death: September 13, 1996 (aged 81)

College career
Years	Team	Apps	(Gls)
1938	North Carolina Tar Heels		

Managerial career
- 1947–1950: North Carolina Tar Heels
- 1953–1976: North Carolina Tar Heels

E. Marvin Allen Jr. (January 6, 1915 – September 13, 1996) was an American former collegiate head soccer coach. He started the University of North Carolina soccer program in 1947, and became the program's first ever coach. From 1947 to 1976, he coached the North Carolina men's soccer program. He compiled a 174-81-23(.667) record in 30 years with the Tar Heels, boasting a 53-41-16(.555) mark in ACC play. He coached soccer coaching legend Anson Dorrance at UNC.

In 1962, he served as president of the National Soccer Coaches Association of America (NSCAA). He was inducted into the NSCAA Hall of Fame in 1988. He died in 1996, and was posthumously inducted into the North Carolina Soccer Hall of Fame.

== Career ==
Born in Wilmington, North Carolina. During his undergraduate years as a student Allen played on the University of North Carolina's club team against arch-rival Duke, to which he scored the clubs first ever goal on.

After completing his education, Allen then was the one who started the University of North Carolina's Tar Heels soccer program from 1947 to 1976. Over his stint with the university, he had an overall record of 174 wins, 81 draws, and 23 loses. Not only this, during his time with the Tar Heels, he also coached many individuals to success including coaching legend Anson Dorrance. After coaching the team for almost 30 years, he finally retired in 1976.

His career with the team remains impressive to this day as he was the coach who led the team with a .667% win record and won a championship in the Southern Conference in 1948, co-champion in the Atlantic Coast Conference in 1968, and came in 2nd place in ACC play 9 times - to which they never placed lower than 4th in all their times playing.

Allen obtained a number of prestigious positions not only with the University of North Carolina, but also with the National Soccer Coaches Association of America (NSCAA). Not only did he become the first coach for the Tar Heels program in 1940, he also obtained a position as a Physical Education Instructor which then soon led him to become a professor in 1964. Allen then proceeded to hold chairman positions with the College of Physical Education Association, Joint Committee for Physical Education for College Men and Women, NC Association for Health, Physical Education, and Recreation and Atlantic Coast Conference Soccer Committee. He also held the position of President with the NSCAA in 1962, along with being inducted into the NSCAA Hall of Fame in 1998.

After his death, Allen was posthumously inducted into the North Carolina Soccer Hall of Fame in 1996.

== Education and life ==
While also a player and a coach, Allen received an education from the University of North Carolina. He graduated from the University of North Carolina with a Bachelors and a Masters and proceeded to obtain a Doctorate from Pennsylvania State University in 1960.

Allen married to Helen Dugan from Washington D.C, to which they then had 2 children. Allen died on September 13, 1996, at the age of 81.
