= Vanderbilt Commodores men's soccer =

American college soccer team

- (defunct)
- Founded: 1973
- Folded: 2006; 20 years ago
- University: Vanderbilt University
- Head coach: Vacant
- Conference: MVC
- Location: Nashville, Tennessee, US
- Stadium: VU Soccer Complex (capacity: 1,000)
- Nickname: Commodores
- Colors: Black and gold
Home

NCAA tournament appearances
- None

Conference tournament championships
- None

Conference Regular Season championships
- Sun Belt 1996

The Vanderbilt Commodores men's soccer represented Vanderbilt University in NCAA Division I men's college soccer competitions. The Commodores played as an associate member of the Missouri Valley Conference through 2005.

The program was born in 1973 and was dropped in 2006. The college cited Title IX as the reason for its decision. However, supporters of the team and some experts on the legislation said this was not necessary. The decision caused outcry, with soccer players making petitions to resurrect the program. It was also revealed that men's soccer had low costs of operation.

== Record by season ==
Statistics overview
Season	Coach	Overall	Conference	Standing	Postseason
Vanderbilt Commodores (Southeastern Conference) (1973–1977)
1973	Randy Johnson	10–4–3		-?-	
1974	Randy Johnson	9–3–3		-?-	
1975	Randy Johnson	12–2–2		-?-	
1976	Randy Johnson	8–5–2		-?-	
1977	Randy Johnson	8–5–3		-?-	
1978	Randy Johnson	10–4–3	4–2–0	-?-	(Conference not recognized)
1979	Randy Johnson	8–14–2	4–1–1	-?-	(Conference not recognized)
1980	Randy Johnson	3–10–2	1–2–0	-?-	(Conference not recognized)
1981	Randy Johnson	5–7–3	0–2–1	-?-	(Conference not recognized)
1982	Randy Johnson	9–8–2	1–0–0	-?-	(Conference not recognized)
Vanderbilt Commodores (Division I Independent) (1983–1996)
1983	Randy Johnson	12–8–0			
1984	Randy Johnson	11–10–0			
1985	Randy Johnson	12–8–0			
1986	Randy Johnson	6–11–4			
1987	Randy Johnson	9–9–1			
1988	Randy Johnson	7–10–1			
1989	Randy Johnson	5–15–0			
1990	Randy Johnson	10–10–1			
1991	Randy Johnson	7–10–2			
1992	Randy Johnson	7–10–2			
1993	Randy Johnson	11–7–0			
1994	Randy Johnson	11–7–1			
Vanderbilt Commodores (Sun Belt Conference) (1995–1996)
1995	Randy Johnson	9–8–2	3–2–0	t-3rd	
1996	Randy Johnson	13–5–1	3–0–1	1st	(Conference lost recognition)
Vanderbilt Commodores (Missouri Valley Conference) (1997–2005)
1997	Randy Johnson	9–8–3	2–2–3	4th	
1998	Randy Johnson	11–8–1	3–3–1	5th	
1999	Randy Johnson	10–9–0	4–3–0	t-3rd	
2000	Randy Johnson	9–11–0	6–5–0	t-5th	
2001	Randy Johnson	6–10–1	3–6–0	t-7th	
2002	Tim McClements	1–8–0	3–15–0	10th	
2003	Tim McClements	0–7–2	3–10–5	9th	
2004	Tim McClements	3–6–0	7–10–1	8th	
2005	Tim McClements	9–7–2	4–2–1	t-3rd	
Total:		223–255–36 (.469)			
National champion Postseason invitational champion Conference regular season champion Conference regular season and conference tournament champion Division regular season champion Division regular season and conference tournament champion Conference tournament champion
