= Alice Hindson =

English weaver

Alice Maud Charlotte Hindson (1896–1984) was an English weaver. She was one of the founders of the Guild of Weavers, Spinners and Dyers in England.

== Early life and education ==
Hindson was born in Andover, Hampshire in 1896, the daughter of John Hutchinson Hindson, a clergyman, and Lavinia Hindson. She attended Cheltenham Ladies College. During World War I, the college became a hospital for wounded soldiers and Hindson worked there as a quartermaster. The family moved to Brockenhurst after the death of her father and in 1920 she attended the Central School of Arts and Crafts in London, studying drawing, lettering and wood engraving under Noel Rooke who had been a student of Edward Johnston.

== Career ==
Hindson began illustrating books and in 1921 joined the Society of Scribes and Illuminators, serving as its secretary from 1928 to 1931. At "the Central", Hindson learned draw-loom weaving from tutor Luther Hooper. Many of her designs woven in Chinese silk, and derived from her wood engravings, were illustrated in Hooper's 1932 book, The New Draw-Loom. (Note: See: Hooper, Luther (1932). The new draw loom: its construction and operation described for the use of handicraft pattern weavers (PDF). London: Sir Isaac Pitman & Sons, Ltd. OCLC 1008483535.) In the early 1930s, Hindson spent over a year in Ditchling and wove with Elizabeth Peacock where she scaled up and created a bedspread, but it was for her small detailed patterns using naturally dyed silks that she was known. She returned to Brockenhurst and in 1931 became a founder of the Guild of Weavers, Spinners and Dyers. She was the author of Designer's Drawloom: an introduction to Drawloom Weaving and Repeat Pattern Planning (Note: See: Hindson, Alice Maud Charlotte (1958). Designer's Drawloom. An introduction to drawloom weaving and repeat pattern planning. London: Faber & Faber. OCLC 560577786.) published by Faber and Faber in 1958 and described the use of the shaft drawloom developed by Luther Hooper.

== Personal life ==
Little is recorded of Hindson's personal life although she had three brothers and a sister on the 1901 census. The 1939 census records that Hindson was living with her mother and sister and working as an ARP ambulance driver. They were all living off private means.
