= Anson Dorrance =

American soccer player and coach (born 1951)

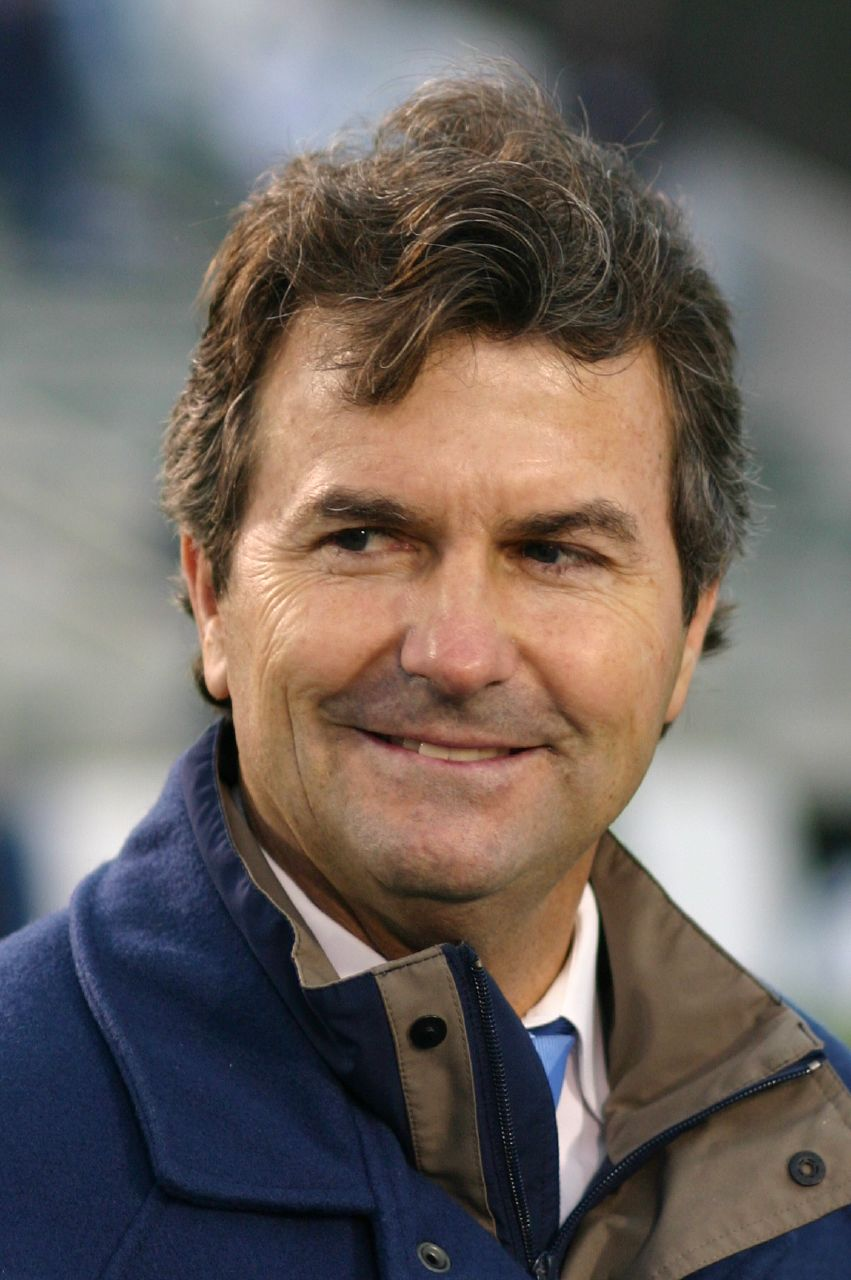
- Dorrance during the final of the 2006 Women's College Cup

Personal information
- Full name: Albert Anson Dorrance IV
- Date of birth: April 9, 1951 (age 75)
- Place of birth: Bombay, India
- Height: 5 ft 10 in (1.78 m)
- Position: Midfielder

Youth career
- –1969: Villa St. Jean

College career
Years	Team	Apps	(Gls)
1969	St. Mary's Rattlers		
1971–1973	North Carolina Tar Heels		

Senior career*
Years	Team	Apps	(Gls)
1974–197?	Chapel Hill Soccer Club		

Managerial career
- 1974–197?: Chapel Hill Soccer Club (player-coach)
- 1976: North Carolina Tar Heels (men's assistant)
- 1977–1988: North Carolina Tar Heels (men)
- 1979–2023: North Carolina Tar Heels (women)
- 1986–1994: United States (women)
Medal record
Women's football
Representing United States (as coach)
FIFA Women's World Cup
First place	1991 China
Summer Universiade
Silver medal – second place	1993 Buffalo	Team
CONCACAF Women's Championship
Winner	1991 Haiti
Winner	1993 United States
Winner	1994 Canada
- * Club domestic league appearances and goals

Albert Anson Dorrance IV (born April 9, 1951) is an American retired soccer coach. He was the head coach of the women's soccer program at the University of North Carolina (UNC) from 1979 to 2024 and of the men's program from 1977 through 1988. He has one of the most successful coaching records in the history of athletics. Under Dorrance's leadership, the Tar Heels women won 21 of the 41 NCAA Women's Soccer Championships, and their record under Dorrance stands at 809-67-36 (W-L-D; .919 winning percentage). He led his team to a 101-game unbeaten streak and coached 13 different women to a total of 20 National Player of the Year awards.

The NCAA has recognized Dorrance as the Women's Soccer Coach of the Year seven times (1982, 1986, 1997, 2000, 2001, 2003 and 2006) and as the Men's Soccer Coach of the Year in 1987. On March 10, 2008, Dorrance was elected to the National Soccer Hall of Fame.

== Early life ==
Dorrance was born in Bombay, India on April 9, 1951, the son of an American oil executive. He spent his youth moving with his family throughout Europe and Africa. Of all the places he lived, three had particular influences on his later life. In Addis Ababa, Ethiopia he met his future wife, M'Liss Gary, the daughter of the U.S. Air Force attaché to Ethiopia. He attributes his love of soccer to his years living in Kenya. He gained his education from the Villa St. Jean International School boarding school, located in Fribourg, Switzerland, where he played soccer for three years and graduated in 1969.

After graduating from Villa St. Jean, he moved to the United States and attended St. Mary's University in San Antonio, Texas, where he played soccer for a semester. He transferred after the fall term to the University of North Carolina. There, he was a member of St. Anthony Hall. His love of soccer led him to walk onto the school's soccer team, then coached by Marvin Allen, where he was a three time All-ACC player. As he transferred from another college, he was ineligible to play during his sophomore year, and only joined the team as a junior in 1971. He played as a midfielder, and was team captain in 1973 as a post-senior. In 1974, he graduated with a B.A. in English and philosophy. That year he also married his childhood sweetheart, M'Liss Gary, with whom he has three children: Michelle, Natalie, and Donovan. After graduating, Dorrance was the player-coach of Chapel Hill Soccer Club.

== UNC men's soccer team (1977-1988) ==
Under the influence of his father, Dorrance entered North Carolina Central University Law School in 1976, later transferring to the University of North Carolina School of Law. That same year, Coach Allen convinced Dorrance to succeed him as the UNC men's soccer coach. From 1977 until 1988 Dorrance compiled a 175–65–21 (.751 winning percentage) record with the men's team. His greatest success with the men's team came in 1987 when he led them to the Atlantic Coast Conference tournament championship. They beat North Carolina State University 3-2, winning their first ACC tournament. They also went to the NCAA Final Four in 1987, losing to Clemson University 4–1 in the semi-final game. That year he also won the NCAA Men's Soccer Coach of the Year.

== UNC women's soccer team (1979-2023) ==
In 1979, the University of North Carolina (UNC) expanded Dorrance's duties to include the newly established women's team as well as the men's soccer team. It was this event that moved Dorrance into the limelight. At the time, the National Collegiate Athletic Association (NCAA) did not have a women's soccer championship. When the NCAA showed no interest in establishing one, Dorrance and University of Colorado coach Chris Lidstone approached the Association for Intercollegiate Athletics for Women (AIAW), who were receptive to the idea. Within two years of the start of the program, Dorrance had guided the Tar Heels to the 1981 AIAW title. After the AIAW led the way, the NCAA finally recognized women's soccer as an inter-collegiate sport and Dorrance's teams proceeded to dominate the sport. His teams won 12 of the first 13 NCAA championships (1982–1984, 1986–1994). After winning the 2012 NCAA championship, the Tar Heels have claimed a total of 23 national championships and 22 of the 37 NCAA championships.

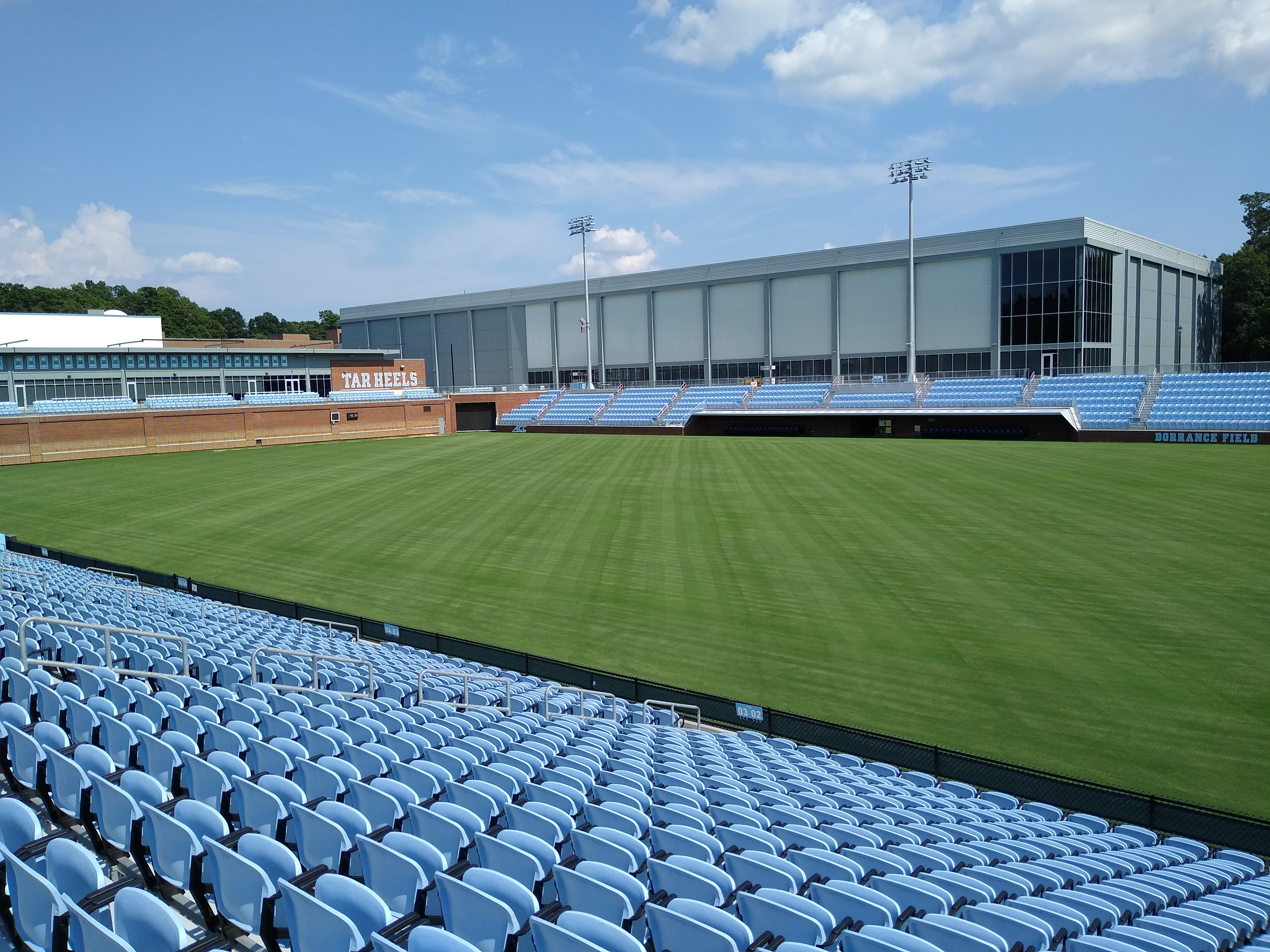
Dorrance Field at UNC is named after Anson Dorrance.

Dorrance's success came from several interrelated attributes. First, he had an eye for recruiting outstanding talent. Related to that was his emphasis on competitiveness. He noted early in his time as a women's coach that women seemed to have an inhibition against open competition. He decided to develop an atmosphere at UNC in which women were rewarded for having an aggressive desire to win. Finally, he noted from his work with both the men's and women's teams that women tended to play best in an atmosphere that focused on relationships.

Dorrance was able to bring out his players' aggressiveness and competitiveness while also fostering an almost family sense of the team. Regarding the aggressiveness, Santa Clara University women's soccer coach Jerry Smith noted in a 1998 Sports Illustrated article, "When you watch them, you can see the edge they have. I'll go beyond aggressiveness. It's meanness. Anson has found a way to bring that out of his players." Mia Hamm added in the same article, "I grew up always good at sports, but being a girl, I was never allowed to feel as good about it as guys were. My toughness wasn't celebrated. But then I got to the University of North Carolina, and it was OK to want to be the best." In 2019, the soccer stadium at UNC previously known as Fetzer Field was renamed "Dorrance Field" in his honor.

On August 11, 2024, Dorrance announced his retirement as head coach of the program.

=== Head coaching record (women's) ===
Records are shown as Wins-Losses-Draws.

Record table
Season	Team	Overall	Conference	Standing	Postseason
North Carolina (Atlantic Coast Conference) (1979–present)
1979	North Carolina	10–2–0	–	–	–
1980	North Carolina	21–5–0	–	–	AIAW Semifinals
1981	North Carolina	23–0–0	–	–	AIAW Champions
1982	North Carolina	19–2–0	–	–	NCAA Champions
1983	North Carolina	19–1–0	–	–	NCAA Champions
1984	North Carolina	24–0–1	–	-	NCAA Champions
1985	North Carolina	18–2–1	–	-	NCAA Runner-up
1986	North Carolina	24–0–1	–	-	NCAA Champions
1987	North Carolina	23–0–1	3–0–0	1st	NCAA Champions
1988	North Carolina	18–0–3	1–0–1	ACC Runner-up	NCAA Champions
1989	North Carolina	24–0–1	4–0–0	ACC Champions	NCAA Champions
1990	North Carolina	20–1–1	4–0–0	ACC Champions	NCAA Champions
1991	North Carolina	24–0–0	4–0–0	ACC Champions	NCAA Champions
1992	North Carolina	25–0–0	4–0–0	ACC Champions	NCAA Champions
1993	North Carolina	23–0–0	4–0–0	ACC Champions	NCAA Champions
1994	North Carolina	25–1–1	5–1–0	ACC Champions	NCAA Champions
1995	North Carolina	25–1–0	7–0–0	ACC Champions	NCAA Semifinals
1996	North Carolina	25–1–0	7–0–0	ACC Champions	NCAA Champions
1997	North Carolina	27–0–1	7–0–0	ACC Champions	NCAA Champions
1998	North Carolina	25–1–0	7–0–0	ACC Champions	NCAA Runner-up
1999	North Carolina	24–2–0	7–0–0	ACC Champions	NCAA Champions
2000	North Carolina	21–3–0	4–3–0	ACC Champions	NCAA Champions
2001	North Carolina	24–1–0	7–0–0	ACC Champions	NCAA Runner-up
2002	North Carolina	21–2–4	4–1–2	ACC Champions	NCAA Semifinals
2003	North Carolina	27–0–0	7–0–0	ACC Champions	NCAA Champions
2004	North Carolina	20–1–2	9–0–0	ACC Runner-up	NCAA Third Round
2005	North Carolina	23–1–1	9–1–0	ACC Champions	NCAA Quarterfinals
2006	North Carolina	27–1–0	10–0–0	ACC Champions	NCAA Champions
2007	North Carolina	19–4–1	9–1–0	ACC Champions	NCAA Third Round
2008	North Carolina	25–1–2	9–0–1	ACC Champions	NCAA Champions
2009	North Carolina	23–3–1	7–3–0	ACC Champions	NCAA Champions
2010	North Carolina	19–3–2	8–2–0	ACC Semifinals	NCAA Third Round
2011	North Carolina	13–5–2	6–3–1	ACC Quarterfinals	NCAA Third Round
2012	North Carolina	15–5–2	6–3–1	ACC Quarterfinals	NCAA Champions
2013	North Carolina	20–5–0	10–3-0	ACC Semifinals	NCAA Quarterfinals
2014	North Carolina	14–4–2	9–0–1	ACC Semifinals	NCAA Third Round
2015	North Carolina	15–5–1	7–3–0	ACC Finalist	NCAA Second Round
2016	North Carolina	17–4–3	6–2–2	ACC Finalist	NCAA Semifinals
2017	North Carolina	17–3–2	8–0–2	ACC Champions	NCAA Third Round
2018	North Carolina	21–4–2	10–0–0	ACC Runner-up	NCAA Runner-up
2019	North Carolina	24–1–2	9–0–1	ACC Champions	NCAA Runner-up
2020	North Carolina	18–2–0	8–0–0	ACC Runner-up	NCAA Semifinals
2021	North Carolina	12–3–3	5–2–3	6th	NCAA First Round
2022	North Carolina	20–5–1	8–2–0	ACC Runner-up	NCAA Runner-up
2023	North Carolina	13–2–8	5–0–5	4th	NCAA Quarterfinals
North Carolina:		934–87–54	244–30–20		
Total:		1106–152–75			
National champion Postseason invitational champion Conference regular season champion Conference regular season and conference tournament champion Division regular season champion Division regular season and conference tournament champion Conference tournament champion

== United States national team coach ==
His success at North Carolina led to the United States Soccer Federation hiring Dorrance as the coach of the United States women's national soccer team (USWNT) in 1986. In taking the job, Dorrance delivered a letter containing a stark warning to the players he inherited: "If you don't come in fit, I will cut you!" He successfully juggled his duties to both the national team and UNC. In one extreme case, Dorrance left Assistant Coach Bill Palladino to lead UNC to a championship victory in the 1991 NCAA tournament while he led the USWNT to the 1991 World Cup championship. In that tournament, the United States won the first Women's World Cup, held in China. When Dorrance ended his tenure in 1994 with the national team, he had accumulated a record of 65–22–5 (.761) record. He has coached some of the finest players in women's soccer history, including Michelle Akers, Mia Hamm and Kristine Lilly.

== Honors ==
In May 2005 Dorrance was elected as a member of the North Carolina Sports Hall of Fame. In February 2016 he received the Werner Fricker Builder Award, a special award named after Werner Fricker.

=== Coaching ===
North Carolina Tar Heels women

- 21x NCAA Division I Tournament Champion (1982, 1983, 1984, 1986–1994, 1996, 1997, 1999, 2000, 2003, 2006, 2008, 2009, 2012)
- 22x ACC Tournament Champion (1989–2003, 2005–2009, 2017, 2019)
- 23x ACC Regular Season Champion (1987, 1989–1993, 1995–1999, 2001–2008, 2014, 2017, 2019, 2020)

United States women

- Women's World Cup (1991)

=== Individual ===
- 7x National Coach of the Year (1982, 1986, 1987, 1997, 2000, 2003, 2006)
- 12x ACC Coach of the Year (1982, 1986, 1987, 1997, 2000, 2001, 2003, 2004, 2006, 2008, 2018, 2019).
- North Carolina Soccer Hall of Fame (2002)
- North Carolina Sports Hall of Fame (2005)
- National Soccer Hall of Fame (2008)
- United Soccer Coaches' Hall of Fame (2018)

== Court cases ==
In 1998 a former player, Melissa Jennings, sued Dorrance for sexual harassment. He had just cut her from the team. Initially, it appeared the suit was retaliation against Dorrance. However, Debbie Keller Hill, a former team captain, joined the suit. In October 2004 U.S. District Court Judge N. Carlton Tilley Jr. threw out the six-year lawsuit, stating the "behavior at issue does not constitute severe, pervasive and objectively offensive sexual harassment." In April 2006 a three judge federal appeals panel voted to not reverse the judgement (2–1). Jennings appealed to the full court with oral arguments taking place in October 2006. Hill had earlier settled with the university for $70,000.

The 4th U.S. Circuit Court of Appeals, after a rehearing by the full court, vacated summary judgment for defendants in Jennings' lawsuit. The April 9, 2007, decision allowed Jennings to proceed on her Title IX claim and on sexual harassment civil rights claims under 42 U.S.C. § 1983 against Dorrance and a university official.

The 4th Circuit Court found in favor of Dorrance, the majority opinion stating, "When the evidence in this case is viewed most favorably to Jennings, the evidence shows that Dorrance used vulgar language and participated in sexual banter at practice with some women that he coached and that he once directed a vulgar question at Jennings. Jennings immediately responded to Dorrance’s vulgar question with her own profane reply and that ended the inquiry. Dorrance never touched, never threatened, never ogled, and never propositioned Jennings. Because no reasonable jury could find that Dorrance sexually harassed Jennings or find that Jennings’ other claims have merit, we affirm the judgment of the district court." The dissenting opinion, authored by Judge M. Blane Michael, said that Dorrance's conduct "went far beyond simple teasing and qualified as sexual harassment."

On October 1, 2007, the United States Supreme Court denied a petition by the state Attorney General's Office for the court to hear a nine-year-old sexual harassment suit against UNC-Chapel Hill and its women's soccer coach, Anson Dorrance.

The refusal by the Supreme Court to hear the case meant that the 4th U.S. Circuit Court of Appeals ruling from 2007 would stand and the case could proceed to trial. On January 14, 2008, the suit was settled out of court and Melissa Jennings received $385,000, mostly used for legal fees. The university also reviewed its sexual harassment policies and procedures, and brought in an outside law professor to help. Dorrance was quoted saying. "I think for everyone concerned, it's a good thing. I really feel like both parties felt it had gone long enough." The coach issued a written apology to the player, her family, and team members saying that his comments were inappropriate.

== See also ==
- List of college women's soccer career coaching wins leaders

== Bibliography ==
- Lisi, Clemente Angelo (2010). The U.S. Women's Soccer Team: An American Success Story. Plymouth, England: Scarecrow Press. p. 6. ISBN 978-0810874152.
