= Trevor Adair =

Soccer coach (1960 or 1961 – 2020)

Personal information
- Date of birth: 1960 or 1961
- Place of birth: Belfast, Northern Ireland
- Date of death: 28 October 2020 (aged 59)

College career
Years	Team	Apps	(Gls)
1978–1981	Lock Haven Bald Eagles		

Managerial career
- 1982–1990: South Carolina Gamecocks (assistant)
- 1991–1994: Brown Bears
- 1993: United States U-18 (assistant)
- 1995–2008: Clemson Tigers

Trevor Adair (1960 or 1961 – 28 October 2020) was the head coach of the Clemson Tigers men's soccer team. He coached at the collegiate level from 1982, after playing soccer at Lock Haven University.

== Playing career ==
Adair was born in Belfast, Northern Ireland. Michael Parker, men's soccer head coach at Lock Haven University, recruited him, and he played four seasons, 1978 to 1981, with the Eagles. In 1978, Lock Haven won the Division III NCAA Men's Soccer Championship. In 1980, having moved up a division, they won the Division II title. That year, Adair was selected as a first team All American after leading Lock Haven in scoring with sixteen goals. Adair graduated in 1982 with a bachelor's degree in economics.

== Coaching career ==
Following his graduation from Lock Haven, Adair chose not to pursue a career as a professional player, but to enter the coaching ranks. He moved to the University of South Carolina where he was an assistant coach for nine seasons. Adair moved to Brown University, becoming the men's soccer head coach in November 1990. In his four seasons at Brown, he compiled a 34–24–5 record. In 1993, Adair spent time as an assistant coach with the U.S. U-18 national team. In 1995, Clemson hired Adair as head coach to the men's soccer team. Through 2007, Adair had a 160–71–23 record, having been named the 1998 ACC Coach of the Year in addition to taking the Tigers to the 2005 Final Four. At some point during his career, Adair also served as an assistant with the United States U-20 men's national soccer team. In April 2009, Clemson placed Adair on a leave of absence after he reportedly assaulted his two daughters during a domestic dispute. Adair resigned as coach on 14 June 2009.

== Death ==
Adair died on 28 October 2020, aged 59.
