= 1987 NCAA Division I men's soccer tournament =

1987 Men's College Cup

Tournament details
- Country: United States
- Venue(s): Riggs Field; Clemson, South Carolina
- Teams: 24

Final positions
- Champions: Clemson (2nd title)
- Runners-up: San Diego State
- Semifinalists: Harvard; North Carolina

Tournament statistics
- Matches played: 23
- Goals scored: 55 (2.39 per match)
- Attendance: 57,009 (2,479 per match)
- Top goal scorer(s): Bruce Murray, Clemson (5)

Awards
- Best player: Bruce Murray, Clemson (offensive); Tim Genovese, Clemson (defensive)

The 1987 NCAA Division I men's soccer tournament was the 29th annual tournament organized by the National Collegiate Athletic Association to determine the national champion of men's collegiate soccer among its Division I members in the United States.

Clemson Tigers won their second national title, defeating San Diego State in the championship game, 2–0.

The final match was played on December 6 at Riggs Field in Clemson, South Carolina. All the other games were played at the home field of the higher seeded team.

== Qualifying ==
No teams made their debut appearances in the NCAA Division I men's soccer tournament.

== Bracket ==
- Home teams are indicated by *

=== Regional 1 ===
First round

Second round November 21
Hartwick	0
Adelphi (ot)	1
Harvard (ot)	1
*	Connecticut	0

Quarterfinals; November 29
Adelphi	0
Harvard	3

=== Regional 2 ===
First round November 15
UCLA	1
*	Fresno State	0
San Francisco	0
*	UNLV	1
San Diego State	2
*	Saint Louis	1

Second round November 21
UCLA (forfeit) (Note: UNLV was disqualified from the tournament for using an ineligible player against San Francisco.)
UNLV
San Diego State (pen.)	3
*	SMU	3

Quarterfinals; November 29
UCLA	1
*	San Diego State	2

=== Regional 3 ===
First round November 15
Clemson	2
*	Evansville	1

Second round November 21–22
Clemson	2
*	Indiana	1
Seton Hall	1
*	Rutgers	2

Quarterfinals; November 29
*	Clemson	3
Rutgers	2

=== Regional 4 ===
First round November 15
NC State	0
*	South Carolina	1
North Carolina	2
*	Duke	0
George Mason	0
*	Virginia	2
William & Mary	0
*	Loyola Maryland	1

Second round November 22
*	South Carolina	1
North Carolina	2
Virginia	0
*	Loyola Maryland	1

Quarterfinals; November 29
North Carolina	1
*	Loyola Maryland	0

=== College Cup ===
National Semifinals; December 5
Harvard	1
San Diego State (pen.)	1
Clemson	4
North Carolina	1

National Final; December 6
San Diego State	0
Clemson	2

== Finals ==
=== Semifinals ===
December 5, 1987

Harvard	1–1 (a.e.t.)	San Diego State
Derek Mills 20'	Report	Brad Walsh 80'
Penalties
	4–5

Riggs Field, Clemson, South Carolina

December 5, 1987

Clemson	4–1	North Carolina
Pearse Tormey 30'; David Veghte 42'; Bruce Murray 67'; Pearse Tormey 77'	Report	Derek Missimo 69'

Riggs Field, Clemson, South Carolina

=== Final ===
December 6, 1987

San Diego State	0–2	Clemson
	Report	Paul Rutenis 23'; Richie Richmond 90'

Riggs Field, Clemson, South Carolina
Attendance: 8,322

== See also ==
- 1987 NCAA Division I women's soccer tournament
- 1987 NCAA Division II soccer tournament
- 1987 NCAA Division III men's soccer tournament
- 1987 NAIA men's soccer championship
