= I. M. Ibrahim =

Soccer coach (1941–2008)

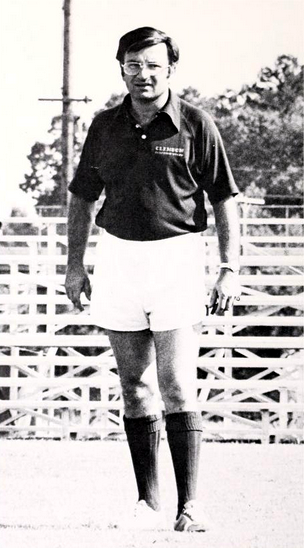

Biographical details
- Born: June 23, 1941; Haifa, Mandatory Palestine (now Israel)
- Died: July 12, 2008 (aged 67); Seneca, South Carolina

Coaching career (HC unless noted)
- 1967–1994: Clemson

Head coaching record
- Overall: 388–100–31

Accomplishments and honors

Championships
- ACC regular season (1972, 1973, 1974, 1975, 1976, 1977, 1978, 1979, 1981, 1982, 1985, 1990, 1993); NCAA Division I Final Four (1973, 1976, 1978, 1979, 1984, 1987); NCAA Division I (1984, 1987)

Awards
- ACC Coach of the Year (1973, 1978, 1985, 1990, 1993); Clemson University Athletic Hall Of Fame (2000); South Carolina Athletic Hall of Fame (2007); Shorter College Athletic Hall Of Fame (2002)

Ibrahim M. Ibrahim (June 23, 1941 – July 12, 2008) was the head coach and founder of the Clemson University men's soccer team. Ibrahim coached the team from 1967 to 1994, winning two NCAA Division I Men's Soccer Championships, in 1984 and 1987.

== Biography ==
Ibrahim M. Ibrahim lived in Haifa before moving to the United States in 1960. He earned a BS in chemistry from Shorter College, where he worked as soccer coach from 1962 to 1964. He later entered the chemistry master's degree program at Clemson University, where he would also earn a PhD in 1970.

While a student at Clemson, Ibrahim founded the University's men's soccer program in 1967. He remained coach for twenty-eight years, and coached the team to two NCAA Division I Men's Soccer Championships, in 1984 and 1987. In 1974, Ibrahim was also named coach of the university's track team. Ibrahim resigned as coach in 1994. His final record as soccer coach was 388 wins, 102 ties, and 31 losses.

He is an inductee into the Clemson University Athletic Hall of Fame, the Shorter College Athletic Hall of Fame, and the South Carolina Athletic Hall of Fame (2007). In February 1985, he was given South Carolina's Order of the Palmetto.

== Death ==
Ibrahim collapsed on July 12, 2008, while playing golf at Cross Creek Plantation Country Club in Seneca, South Carolina. He died later that day.
