= 2013 Notre Dame Fighting Irish men's soccer team =

American college soccer season

2013 Notre Dame Fighting Irish men's soccer

National Champions

ACC Regular Season Champions

NCAA Tournament, College Cup vs. Maryland, W 2–1
- Conference: Atlantic Coast Conference
- Record: 17–1–6 (7–1–3 ACC)
- Head coach: Bobby Clark (13th season)
- Assistant coaches: B. J. Craig (6th season); Greg Dalby (2nd season)
- Home stadium: Alumni Stadium

2013 ACC men's soccer standings
	Conf.						Overall
Team	W		L		T	PCT	W		L		T	PCT
No. 1 Notre Dame + ‍‍‍	7	–	1	–	3	.773	17	–	1	–	6	.833
No. 2 Maryland ‡ ‍‍‍	7	–	1	–	3	.773	17	–	4	–	5	.750
No. 11 Wake Forest + ‍‍‍	6	–	1	–	4	.727	10	–	6	–	5	.595
North Carolina + ‍‍‍	4	–	2	–	5	.591	9	–	6	–	5	.575
Clemson + ‍‍‍	5	–	4	–	2	.545	11	–	7	–	3	.595
No. 3 Virginia + ‍‍‍	4	–	3	–	4	.545	13	–	6	–	5	.646
Duke ‍‍‍	3	–	3	–	5	.500	8	–	5	–	6	.579
Boston College ‍‍‍	4	–	6	–	1	.409	7	–	9	–	2	.444
NC State ‍‍‍	3	–	5	–	3	.409	8	–	5	–	4	.588
Syracuse ‍‍‍	3	–	7	–	1	.318	10	–	7	–	1	.583
Virginia Tech ‍‍‍	1	–	5	–	5	.318	4	–	8	–	5	.382
Pittsburgh ‍‍‍	0	–	8	–	2	.100	1	–	11	–	4	.188
‡ - Tournament champion + - Invited to the NCAA Division I Men's Soccer Championship; As of November 25, 2013; Rankings from NSCAA

The 2013 Notre Dame Fighting Irish men's soccer team represented the University of Notre Dame during the 2013 NCAA Division I men's soccer season. It was the 37th season of the university fielding a program. The Irish were coached by 13th-year head coach Bobby Clark and sixth year assistant coach, B. J. Craig, who was promoted to associate head coach prior to the season's start. Additionally, the coaching staff consisted of second year assistant coach, Greg Dalby.

The 2013 season was the Irish's first year winning an NCAA title. The Irish finished the season with 17–1–6 record, and defeated Wisconsin, Wake Forest, Michigan State, New Mexico and Maryland en route to the championship. Additionally, the Irish won the ACC regular season with a 7–1–3 record.

== Roster ==
The following players were members of the 2013 Notre Dame team.

Note: Flags indicate national team as defined under FIFA eligibility rules; some limited exceptions apply. Players may hold more than one non-FIFA nationality.

No.	Pos.	Nation	Player
0	GK	USA	Adam LaPlaca
1	GK	USA	Patrick Wall
2	DF	USA	Trevor Gonzalez
3	MF	USA	Connor Klekota
4	DF	USA	Connor Miller
5	MF	USA	Brenden Lesch
6	DF	USA	Max Lachowecki
7	FW	USA	Alex Priede
8	MF	USA	Nick Besler
9	FW	USA	Leon Brown
10	FW	USA	Harry Shipp (captain)
11	MF	USA	Oliver Harris
12	DF	USA	Andrew O'Malley (captain)
13	GK	USA	Chris Hubbard
14	MF	USA	Andrew Cupero

No.	Pos.	Nation	Player
15	MF	USA	Evan Panken
16	DF	USA	Michael Shipp
17	MF	USA	Danny Lojek
18	MF	USA	Robby Gallegos
19	MF	USA	Kyle Craft
20	DF	USA	Grant Van De Casteele (captain)
21	FW	USA	Vince Cicciarelli
22	DF	USA	Luke Mishu
23	DF	USA	Matt Habrowski
24	DF	USA	Mark Mishu
25	MF	USA	Brandon Aubrey
26	MF	USA	Mark Gormley
27	MF	USA	Patrick Hodan
28	MF	USA	Patrick Connolly
30	GK	USA	Brian Talcott

== Schedule ==
Date Time, TV	Rank^{#}	Opponent^{#}	Result	Record	Site City, State
Regular season
08-30-2013*; 5:00 pm	No. 7	vs. No. 9 UCLA; IU Credit Classic/Rivalry	T 0–0 ^{2OT}	0–0–1	Bill Armstrong Stadium (3,142); Bloomington, IN
09-01-2013*; 11:30 am	No. 7	vs. SMU; IU Credit Classic	W 2–1	1–0–1	Bill Armstrong Stadium (7,720); Bloomington, IN
09-08-2013; 12:00 pm, ESPNU	No. 4	No. 1 North Carolina	T 1–1 ^{2OT}	1–0–2 (0–0–1)	Alumni Stadium (2,093); Notre Dame, IN
09-13-2013; 7:00 pm	No. 4	at No. 25 Syracuse	W 3–0	2–0–2 (1–0–1)	SU Soccer Stadium (1,538); Syracuse, NY
09-17-2013*; 7:30 pm	No. 1	Michigan; Rivalry	W 3–0	3–0–2	Alumni Stadium (1,095); Notre Dame, IN
09-21-2013; 7:00 pm	No. 1	at Boston College; Holy War	T 1–1 ^{2OT}	3–0–3 (1–0–2)	Newton Soccer Complex (2,000); Chestnut Hill, MA
09-27-2013; 7:30 pm	No. 2	Duke	W 3–1	4–0–3 (2–0–2)	Alumni Stadium (3,007); Notre Dame, IN
10-02-2013*; 7:00 pm	No. 2	Indiana; Rivalry	W 2–0	5–0–3	Alumni Stadium (2,042); Notre Dame, IN
10-05-2013; 7:00 pm, ESPN3	No. 2	at No. 13 Clemson	W 2–1 ^{OT}	6–0–3 (3–0–2)	Riggs Field (3,680); Clemson, SC
10-08-2013; 7:00 pm, ACCN	No. 2	No. 5 Maryland	T 1–1 ^{2OT}	6–0–4 (3–0–3)	Alumni Stadium (991); Notre Dame, IN
10-11-2013; 7:00 pm, ESPN3	No. 2	at Virginia Tech	W 1–0	7–0–4 (4–0–3)	Thompson Field (2,237); Blacksburg, VA
10-15-2013*; 7:00 pm	No. 2	No. 13 Northwestern	T 1–1 ^{2OT}	7–0–5	Alumni Stadium (587); Notre Dame, IN
10-11-2013; 7:00 pm, ESPN3	No. 2	at NC State	W 2–1	8–0–5 (5–0–3)	Dail Soccer Complex (926); Raleigh, NC
10-26-2013; 2:00 pm	No. 2	No. 19 NC State	L 0–2	8–1–5 (5–1–3)	Alumni Stadium (1,067); Notre Dame, IN
11-2-2013; 7:00 pm	No. 2	at No. 12 Wake Forest	W 3–1	9–1–5 (6–1–3)	Spry Stadium (3,991); Winston–Salem, NC
11-5-2013*; 3:00 pm, Big Ten Network	No. 1	at No. 18 Michigan State	W 2–0	10–1–5	DeMartin Soccer Complex (819); East Lansing, MI
11-8-2013; 7:00 pm	No. 1	Pittsburgh	W 2–0	11–1–5 (7–1–3)	Alumni Stadium (2,635); Notre Dame, IN
ACC Tournament
11-12-2013; 7:00 pm	No. 1	Duke; Quarterfinals	W 1–0	12–1–5	Alumni Stadium (317); Notre Dame, IN
11-15-2013; 5:30 pm, ESPN3	No. 1	vs. No. 10 Virginia; Semifinals	T 3–3 (3–4 PK) ^{2OT}	12–1–6	Maryland SoccerPlex (317); Germantown, MD
NCAA Tournament
11-24-2013; 7:00 pm	(3)	Wisconsin; Second Round	W 4–0	13–1–6	Alumni Stadium (527); Notre Dame, IN
12-1-2013; 7:00 pm	(3)	(14) Wake Forest; Third Round	W 4–2	14–1–6	Alumni Stadium (486); Notre Dame, IN
12-7-2013; 7:00 pm	(3)	(11) Michigan State; Quarterfinals	W 2–1	15–1–6	Alumni Stadium (1,003); Notre Dame, IN
12-13-2013; 5:00 pm, ESPNU	(3)	vs. (7) New Mexico; College Cup, Semifinals	W 2–0	16–1–6	PPL Park (4,174); Chester, PA
12-15-2013; 3:00 pm, ESPNU	(3)	vs. (5) Maryland; College Cup, Finals	W 2–1	17–1–6	PPL Park (5,303); Chester, PA
*Non-conference game. ^{#}Rankings from United Soccer Coaches. (#) Tournament seedings in parentheses.

== MLS Draft ==
The following members of the 2013 Notre Dame Fighting Irish men's soccer team were selected in the 2014 MLS SuperDraft.

Player	Round	Pick	Position	MLS club	Ref.
(United States) Grant Van De Casteele	1	19	DF	Colorado Rapids	
