= 2013 Clemson Tigers men's soccer team =

American college soccer season

2013 Clemson Tigers men's soccer

ACC Tournament, Semifinals

NCAA Tournament, First Round
- Conference: Atlantic Coast Conference
- Record: 11–7–3 (5–4–2 ACC)
- Head coach: Mike Noonan (4th season)
- Assistant coach: Phillip Jones (1st season)
- Home stadium: Riggs Field

2013 ACC men's soccer standings
	Conf.						Overall
Team	W		L		T	PCT	W		L		T	PCT
No. 1 Notre Dame + ‍‍‍	7	–	1	–	3	.773	17	–	1	–	6	.833
No. 2 Maryland ‡ ‍‍‍	7	–	1	–	3	.773	17	–	4	–	5	.750
No. 11 Wake Forest + ‍‍‍	6	–	1	–	4	.727	10	–	6	–	5	.595
North Carolina + ‍‍‍	4	–	2	–	5	.591	9	–	6	–	5	.575
Clemson + ‍‍‍	5	–	4	–	2	.545	11	–	7	–	3	.595
No. 3 Virginia + ‍‍‍	4	–	3	–	4	.545	13	–	6	–	5	.646
Duke ‍‍‍	3	–	3	–	5	.500	8	–	5	–	6	.579
Boston College ‍‍‍	4	–	6	–	1	.409	7	–	9	–	2	.444
NC State ‍‍‍	3	–	5	–	3	.409	8	–	5	–	4	.588
Syracuse ‍‍‍	3	–	7	–	1	.318	10	–	7	–	1	.583
Virginia Tech ‍‍‍	1	–	5	–	5	.318	4	–	8	–	5	.382
Pittsburgh ‍‍‍	0	–	8	–	2	.100	1	–	11	–	4	.188
‡ - Tournament champion + - Invited to the NCAA Division I Men's Soccer Championship; As of November 25, 2013; Rankings from NSCAA

The 2013 Clemson Tigers men's soccer team was the college's 53rd season of playing organized men's college soccer, and their 26th season playing in the Atlantic Coast Conference. The Tigers were led by fourth-year head coach Mike Noonan, and played their home games at Riggs Field.

== Roster ==
Accessed June 26, 2017

Note: Flags indicate national team as defined under FIFA eligibility rules; some limited exceptions apply. Players may hold more than one non-FIFA nationality.

No.	Pos.	Nation	Player
1	GK	(United States) USA	Matt Churitch
2	DF	(United States) USA	Kyle Fisher
3	MF	(United States) USA	Bobby Belair
4	MF	(England) ENG	Jack Metcalf
5	MF	(United States) USA	Thomas McNamara
6	MF	(England) ENG	Paul Clowes
7	MF	(England) ENG	Alex Stockinger
8	MF	(Puerto Rico) PUR	Manolo Sanchez
9	FW	(United States) USA	Iain Smith
10	FW	(United States) USA	T. J. Casner
11	MF	(United States) USA	Amadou Dia
12	MF	(United States) USA	Tyler Happ
13	MF	(Brazil) BRA	Thales Moreno

No.	Pos.	Nation	Player
14	DF	(United States) USA	Wes Nelson
15	MF	(France) FRA	Alex Happi
16	MF	(United States) USA	John Cajka
18	DF	(Rwanda) RWA	Phanuel Kavita
19	FW	(United States) USA	Kyle Murphy
20	FW	(United States) USA	Austen Burnikel
21	MF	(United States) USA	Ara Amirkhanian
22	GK	(United States) USA	Andrew Tarbell
23	DF	(Bermuda) BER	Mauriq Hill
24	GK	(United States) USA	Chris Glodack
25	FW	(United States) USA	Justen Shear
26	MF	(United States) USA	Ryan Sullivan
27	MF	(United States) USA	Richard Robinson

== Draft picks ==
The Tigers had one player drafted in the 2014 MLS SuperDraft.

Player	Team	Round	Pick #	Position
(United States) Thomas McNamara	Chivas USA	2nd	20th	MF

== Schedule ==
Date Time, TV	Rank^{#}	Opponent^{#}	Result	Record	Site City, State
Exhibition
August 22*		vs. Wofford		– (–)	MESA Soccer Complex; Greenville, SC
August 25*		Coastal Carolina		– (–)	CCU Soccer Field; Myrtle Beach, SC
Regular season
August 30*		Mercer	W 2–0	1–0 (0–0)	Riggs Field (6,223); Clemson, SC
September 2*		South Carolina	W 2–1 ^{2OT}	2–0 (0–0)	Riggs Field (5,585); Clemson, SC
September 6		No. 15 Virginia	W 2–0	3–0 (1–0)	Riggs Field (3,125); Clemson, SC
September 8*		at Gardner-Webb	W 3–0	4–0 (1–0)	Riggs Field (544); Clemson, SC
September 14	No. 9	at NC State	W 1–0	5–0 (2–0)	WakeMed Soccer Park (1,809); Raleigh, NC
September 17*	No. 4	at UNC Greensboro	W 2–0	6–0 (2–0)	Riggs Field (1,123); Clemson, SC
September 21	No. 4	at No. 17 Maryland	L 3–1	6–1 (2–1)	Riggs Field (1,230); Clemson, SC
September 24*	No. 15	USC Upstate	W 2–0	7–1 (2–1)	Riggs Field (1,138); Clemson, SC
September 27	No. 15	at Virginia Tech	T 0–0 ^{2OT}	7–1–1 (2–1–1)	Sandra D. Thompson Field (2,061); Blacksburg, VA
October 5	No. 13	No. 2 Notre Dame	L 1–2 ^{OT}	7–2–1 (2–2–1)	Riggs Field (3,680); Clemson, SC
October 8	No. 17	at No. 6 North Carolina	W 2–1 ^{OT}	8–2–1 (3–2–1)	Fetzer Field (795); Chapel Hill, NC
October 11	No. 17	at No. 10 Wake Forest	T 1–1 ^{2OT}	8–2–2 (3–2–2)	Spry Stadium (2,513); Winston-Salem, NC
October 15*	No. 9	No. 17 Furman	L 1–2	8–3–2 (3–2–2)	Riggs Field (3,180); Clemson, SC
October 18		Pittsburgh; Alumni Reunion Day	W 2–0	9–3–2 (4–2–2)	Riggs Field (2,726); Clemson, SC
October 22*	No. 14	at Charlotte	L 1–3	9–4–2 (4–2–2)	Transamerica Field (1,062); Charlotte, NC
October 25	No. 14	Boston College	W 3–2	10–4–2 (5–2–2)	Riggs Field (2,108); Clemson, SC
November 1	No. 19	at Syracuse	L 0–1	10–5–2 (5–3–2)	SU Soccer Stadium (1,007); Syracuse, NY
November 8	No. 23	Duke; Senior Night	L 0-1	10–6–2 (5–4–2)	Riggs Field (2,438); Clemson, SC
ACC Tournament
November 12		No. 15 North Carolina; ACC Tournament Quarterfinals	W 2–1	11–6–2 (5–4–2)	Riggs Field (1,242); Clemson, SC
November 15		No. 4 Maryland; ACC Tournament Semifinals	L 0–1 ^{OT}	11–7–2 (5–4–2)	Ludwig Field (3,352); Germantown, MD
NCAA Tournament
November 21*	No. 24	at No. 18 Elon	T 1–1 (1–4 PKs) ^{2OT}	11–7–3 (5–4–2)	Rudd Field (3,348); Elon, NC
*Non-conference game. ^{#}Rankings from United Soccer Coaches. (#) Tournament seedings in parentheses.

== See also ==
- Clemson Tigers men's soccer
- 2013 Atlantic Coast Conference men's soccer season
- 2013 NCAA Division I men's soccer season
- 2013 ACC Men's Soccer Tournament
- 2013 NCAA Division I Men's Soccer Championship
