= 2013 Atlantic Coast Conference men's soccer season =

Atlantic Coast Conference
- Season: 2013
- Champions: TBD
- Premiers: TBD
- NCAA Tournament: TBD

The 2013 Atlantic Coast Conference men's soccer season is the 27th season of men's varsity soccer in the conference. The season will mark the first for the incoming Notre Dame Fighting Irish, Pittsburgh Panthers and Syracuse Orange, as well as the last ACC season for Maryland, which is leaving for the Big Ten. The 2013 ACC Men's Soccer Tournament will run from November 12–17, with quarterfinals at campus sites followed by the semifinals and final at the Maryland SoccerPlex in Boyds, Maryland.

The defending regular season and tournament champions are the Maryland Terrapins.

== Changes from 2012 ==
- Notre Dame, Syracuse and Pittsburgh are joining the conference

== Teams ==
=== Stadiums and locations ===
Team	Location	Stadium	Capacity
Boston College Eagles	Boston, Massachusetts	Newton Soccer Complex	2,000
Clemson Tigers	Clemson, South Carolina	Riggs Field	6,500
Duke Blue Devils	Durham, North Carolina	Koskinen Stadium	4,500
Maryland Terrapins	College Park, Maryland	Ludwig Field	7,000
Notre Dame Fighting Irish	South Bend, Indiana	Alumni Stadium	3,000
NC State Wolfpack	Raleigh, North Carolina	Dail Field	1,500
North Carolina Tar Heels	Chapel Hill, NC	Fetzer Field	6,000
Pittsburgh Panthers	Pittsburgh, Pennsylvania	Urbanic Field	735
Syracuse Orange	Syracuse, New York	SU Soccer Stadium	1,500
Virginia Cavaliers	Charlottesville, Virginia	Klöckner Stadium	8,000
Virginia Tech Hokies	Blacksburg, Virginia	Thompson Field	2,500
Wake Forest Demon Deacons	Winston-Salem, North Carolina	Spry Stadium	3,000

=== Personnel ===
Team	Head coach	Captain	Shirt supplier
Boston College Eagles	(Republic of Ireland) Ed Kelly	TBA	(United States) Under Armour
Clemson Tigers	(United States) Mike Noonan	TBA	(United States) Nike
Duke Blue Devils	(United States) John Kerr, Jr.	(Nigeria) Sebastien Ibeagha	(United States) Nike
Maryland Terrapins	(North Macedonia) Sasho Cirovski	(United States) Patrick Mullins	(United States) Under Armour
Notre Dame Fighting Irish	(Scotland) Bobby Clark	(United States) Pat Wall	(Germany) Adidas
NC State Wolfpack	(United States) Kelly Findley	(United States) Nazmi Albadawi	(Germany) Adidas
North Carolina Tar Heels	(Guatemala) Carlos Somoano	(United States) Boyd Okwuonu	(United States) Nike
Pittsburgh Panthers	(United States) Joe Luxbacher	(England) Chris Davis	(United States) Nike
Syracuse Orange	(England) Ian McIntyre	(United States) Alex Bono	(United States) Nike
Virginia Cavaliers	(United States) George Gelnovatch	(United States) Kevin McBride	(United States) Nike
Virginia Tech Hokies	(United States) Mike Brizendine	(United States) Kyle Renfro	(United States) Nike
Wake Forest Demon Deacons	(United States) Jay Vidovich	(Brazil) Luca Gaminez	(United States) Nike

== ACC Tournament ==
The 2013 ACC Men's Soccer Tournament, as noted above, will have quarterfinals held at campus sites, with the semifinals and final at the Maryland SoccerPlex.

== Results ==
Home/Away	BC	CLE	DUK	UMD	NCS	UNC	ND	PIT	SYR	UVA	VT	WF
Boston College Eagles												
Clemson Tigers												
Duke Blue Devils												
Maryland Terrapins												
NC State Wolfpack												
North Carolina Tar Heels												
Notre Dame Fighting Irish												
Pittsburgh Panthers												
Syracuse Orange												
Virginia Cavaliers												
Virginia Tech Hokies												
Wake Forest Demon Deacons												

== See also ==
- Atlantic Coast Conference
- 2013 ACC Men's Soccer Tournament
- 2013 NCAA Division I men's soccer season
- 2013 in American soccer
