= 2013 Maryland Terrapins men's soccer team =

Maryland Terrapins
2013 season
- Head coach: Sasho Cirovski
- Stadium: Ludwig Field
- ACC: 1st
- ACC Tournament: Winners
- NCAA Tournament: Runners-up
Home colors	Away colors

The 2013 Maryland Terrapins men's soccer team was the college's 68th season of playing organized men's college soccer. The Terrapins played in the Atlantic Coast Conference where they emerged as the regular season and tournament champions. The Terrapins finished the season as the NCAA runner-up, losing the college cup final to Notre Dame.

== Roster ==
Note: Flags indicate national team as defined under FIFA eligibility rules; some limited exceptions apply. Players may hold more than one non-FIFA nationality.

No.	Pos.	Nation	Player
1	GK	USA	Keith Cardona
2	DF	USA	Alex Crognale
3	MF	USA	Michael Sauers
4	DF	USA	Kyle Roach
5	DF	USA	Mikey Ambrose
6	MF	NOR	Helge Leikvang
7	MF	USA	Dan Metzger
8	MF	HAI	Widner Saint Cyr
9	MF	USA	Alex Shinsky
10	FW	LES	Sunny Jane
11	MF	ETH	Mikias Eticha
12	MF	USA	Jereme Raley
14	FW	USA	Jordan Cyrus
15	FW	USA	Patrick Mullins

No.	Pos.	Nation	Player
16	MF	HUN	David Kabelik
17	FW	HAI	Christiano Francois
18	DF	USA	Dakota Edwards
19	GK	USA	Cody Niedermeier
20	FW	USA	Jake Pace
21	GK	USA	Jordan Tatum
22	MF	USA	Suli Dainkeh
23	FW	ZIM	Schillo Tshuma
24	MF	USA	Daniel Johnson
25	FW	USA	Ryan Reid
26	MF	USA	Chris Odoi-Atsem
29	DF	NZL	Gordon Murie
31	MF	JPN	Tsubasa Endoh
99	GK	USA	Zack Steffen

== Competitions ==
=== Preseason ===
August 20, 2013	#2 Maryland	1–1	Penn State	University Park, Pennsylvania
6:00 pm ET	Mullins 37' (pen.)	Report	Maloney 7'	Stadium: Jeffrey Field; Attendance: 1,031
Note: Since this was an exhibition, the match stood as a draw at the end of regulation.

August 24, 2013	#21 St. John's	2–0	#2 Maryland	College Park, Maryland
7:00 pm ET	Bedoya 64'; L'Esperance 86'	Report		Stadium: Ludwig Field; Attendance: 1,455

=== Regular season ===
==== Match results ====
August 30, 2013 1	#2 Maryland	3–3 (a.e.t.)	Stanford	Stanford, California
10:00 pm ET	Shinsky (yellow card) 32'; Crognale (yellow card) 33'; Mullins 41'; Tshuma 55'; Pace 86'	Report	Crognale 8' (o.g.); Batteer 36', 60'; Kovar (yellow card) 44'; Callinan (yellow card) 68'; Nana-Sinkham (yellow card) 83' (yellow-red card) 100'	Stadium: Cagan Stadium; Attendance: 1,196; Referee: Ioannis Stavridis

September 1, 2013 2	#2 Maryland	2–3 (a.e.t.)	California	Berkeley, California
5:00 pm ET	Tshuma 47'; Pace (yellow card) 46' (goal) 79'; Metzger (yellow card) 96'	Report	Birnbaum 14' (yellow card) 71'; Bonomo 51' (yellow card) 86'; Sundly 97'	Stadium: Edwards Stadium; Attendance: 757; Referee: Ian Anderson

September 6, 2013 3	Duke	1–3	#13 Maryland	College Park, Maryland
7:30 pm ET	Davis 25'; Huitema (yellow card) 52'; McDaniel (yellow card) 73'	Report	Endoh 55'; Liekvang 64' (yellow card) 72'; Mullins 66'; Tshuma (yellow card) 80'	Stadium: Ludwig Field; Attendance: 8,397; Referee: Andrew Chapin

September 8, 2013 4	#24 VCU	3–2	#13 Maryland	College Park, Maryland
7:00 pm ET	Manel 78' (pen.); Belmar 79' (yellow card) 80'; Fisher 87'	Report	Pace 33'; Odoi-Atsem 71'; Steffen (yellow card) 78'	Stadium: Ludwig Field; Attendance: 1,611; Referee: Peter Dhima

=== ACC Tournament ===
November 12, 2013 Quarterfinals	(#8) Clemson	0–2	#4 (#1) Maryland	College Park, Maryland
7:00 pm ET	Frano (yellow card) 89'	Report	Eticha 52'; Endoh 72'; Ambrose (yellow card) 79'	Stadium: Ludwig Field; Attendance: 389; Referee: Mark Kadlecik

November 15, 2013 Semifinals	(#4) Clemson	0–1 (a.e.t.)	#4 (#1) Maryland	Germantown, Maryland
8:00 pm ET	Dia (yellow card) 30'; Fisher (yellow card) 35'; Burnikel (yellow card) 84'	Report	Metzger (yellow card) 69'; Sauers 100'	Stadium: Maryland SoccerPlex; Attendance: 3,352; Referee: John McCloskey

November 17, 2013 Final	#10 (#6) Virginia	0–1	#4 (#1) Maryland	Germantown, Maryland
2:00 pm ET		Report	Zinkhan 88' (o.g.)	Stadium: Maryland SoccerPlex; Attendance: 4,763; Referee: Chico Grajeda

=== NCAA Tournament ===
November 24, 2013 Second round	Providence	1–3	#4 (#5) Maryland	College Park, Maryland
5:00 pm ET	Alder (yellow card) 47'; Towler 69'; Sailor (yellow card) 70'	Report	Sauers 7'; Mullins 70'; Pace 87'	Stadium: Ludwig Field; Attendance: 1,105; Referee: John McCloskey

December 1, 2013 Third round	#13 (#12) UC Irvine	0–1	#4 (#5) Maryland	College Park, Maryland
5:00 pm ET	Bjurman (yellow card) 81'; Cardenas (yellow card) 84'	Report	Mullins 32'; Sauers (yellow card) 63'	Stadium: Ludwig Field; Attendance: 1,337; Referee: Mark Kadleck

December 7, 2013 Quarterfinals	#4 (#5) Maryland	2–1	#6 (#4) California	Berkeley, California
4:30 pm ET	Shinsky 33'; Jane (yellow card) 40'; Sauers 86'	Report	Bonomo 50' (yellow card) 88'	Stadium: PPL Park; Attendance: 2,330; Referee: Ian Anderson

==== College Cup ====
December 13, 2013 Semifinals	#9 (#8) Virginia	1–2	#4 (#5) Maryland	Chester, Pennsylvania
7:00 pm ET	Thomsen (yellow card) 71'; Wharton (yellow card) 73' (goal) 77' (pen.)	Report	Mullins 11', 76'	Stadium: PPL Park; Attendance: 4,172; Referee: Ted Unkel

December 15, 2013 Final	#4 (#5) Maryland	1–2	#3 (#3) Notre Dame	Chester, Pennsylvania
3:30 pm ET	Mullins 35'	Report	Brown 40'; O'Malley 60'	Stadium: PPL Park; Attendance: 5,303; Referee: Chico Grajeda
