= 2013 ACC men's soccer tournament =

Tournament details
- Country: United States
- Teams: 8

Final positions
- Champions: Maryland
- Runners-up: Virginia

Tournament statistics
- Matches played: 7

2013 ACC men's soccer standings
	Conf.						Overall
Team	W		L		T	PCT	W		L		T	PCT
No. 1 Notre Dame + ‍‍‍	7	–	1	–	3	.773	17	–	1	–	6	.833
No. 2 Maryland ‡ ‍‍‍	7	–	1	–	3	.773	17	–	4	–	5	.750
No. 11 Wake Forest + ‍‍‍	6	–	1	–	4	.727	10	–	6	–	5	.595
North Carolina + ‍‍‍	4	–	2	–	5	.591	9	–	6	–	5	.575
Clemson + ‍‍‍	5	–	4	–	2	.545	11	–	7	–	3	.595
No. 3 Virginia + ‍‍‍	4	–	3	–	4	.545	13	–	6	–	5	.646
Duke ‍‍‍	3	–	3	–	5	.500	8	–	5	–	6	.579
Boston College ‍‍‍	4	–	6	–	1	.409	7	–	9	–	2	.444
NC State ‍‍‍	3	–	5	–	3	.409	8	–	5	–	4	.588
Syracuse ‍‍‍	3	–	7	–	1	.318	10	–	7	–	1	.583
Virginia Tech ‍‍‍	1	–	5	–	5	.318	4	–	8	–	5	.382
Pittsburgh ‍‍‍	0	–	8	–	2	.100	1	–	11	–	4	.188
‡ - Tournament champion + - Invited to the NCAA Division I Men's Soccer Championship; As of November 25, 2013; Rankings from NSCAA

The 2013 Atlantic Coast Conference men's soccer tournament was the 27th edition of the ACC Men's Soccer Tournament. The tournament decided the Atlantic Coast Conference champion and guaranteed representative into the 2013 NCAA Division I Men's Soccer Championship. Held at the Maryland SoccerPlex, the Maryland Terrapins, the defending champions, successfully defended their title against their rivals, the Virginia Cavaliers, 1–0 in the final.

== Qualification ==
For the first time since 2001, not every ACC team earned a berth into the tournament. Instead, the top eight teams in the conference based on their conference record earned qualification into the tournament. Ignore the Bracket and Schedule that follows as they are from the 2012 tournament, not 2013.

== Bracket ==
Quarterfinals
1	Maryland	2
8	Boston College	0
4	Clemson	2
5	North Carolina	1
2	Notre Dame	1
7	Duke	0
3	Wake Forest	0
6	Virginia (OT)	1

Semifinals
1	Maryland (OT)	1
4	Clemson	0
2	Notre Dame	3 (3)
6	Virginia (2OT)	3 (4)

Championship
1	Maryland	1
6	Virginia	0

== Schedule ==
=== Play-in round ===
November 5, 2012	Virginia Tech	3–2	N.C. State	College Park, MD
1:00 PM ET	Clemens 24', 82' (yellow card) 81'; Prater 73'	Report	Carmon 8'; Martinez 13'; Risquez (yellow card) 54'	Stadium: Ludwig Field; Referee: Mohammad Samadpour

=== Quarterfinals ===
November 6, 2012	Virginia Tech	1–2	Maryland	College Park, MD
7:00 PM ET	Ranahan (yellow card) 42' (red card) 57'; Clemens 48' (yellow card) 73'; Prater (yellow card) 53'	Report	Stertzer 11' (yellow card) 57'; Mullins 52'	Stadium: Ludwig Field; Attendance: 798; Referee: Jodi Fick

November 6, 2012	Duke	0–1	North Carolina	Chapel Hill, NC
7:00 PM ET	Mathers (yellow card) 41'	Report	Garcia 22'; Goodwin (yellow card) 69'	Stadium: Fetzer Field; Attendance: 1,024; Referee: Peter Dhima

November 6, 2012	Virginia	2–2 (a.e.t.) (5–3 p)	Wake Forest	Winston-Salem, NC
7:00 PM ET	Carroll 33'; Bird 56'; Poarch (yellow card) 80'	Report	Gamble 22'; Okoli 51'	Stadium: Spry Stadium; Attendance: 362; Referee: Mohammad Samadpour
	Penalties
	Bates (penalty scored); Silvester (penalty scored); Wharton (penalty scored); Carroll (penalty scored); Cooke (penalty scored)		(penalty scored) Wenzel; (penalty scored) Gamble; (penalty scored) Gimenez; (penalty missed) Mullin

November 6, 2012	Boston College	0–0 (a.e.t.) (1–3 p)	Clemson	Clemson, SC
7:00 PM ET		Report	Amirkhanian (yellow card) 57'; Stockinger (yellow card) 69'; Godwin (yellow card) 73'; Dia (yellow card) 90'	Stadium: Riggs Field; Attendance: 2,108; Referee: Andrew Chapin
	Penalties
	Mejia (penalty scored); Murphy (penalty missed); Dunn (penalty missed); Taylor (penalty missed)		(penalty scored) Amirkhanian; (penalty scored) Casner; (penalty missed) Sanchez; (penalty scored) Dia

=== Semifinals ===
November 9, 2012	Virginia	0–0 (a.e.t.) (3–4 p)	North Carolina	Boyds, MD
5:30 PM ET	Wharton (yellow card) 87'	Report		Stadium: Maryland SoccerPlex; Attendance: 5,981; Referee: Brent Sorg
	Penalties
	Bates (penalty scored); Silvester (penalty missed); Wharton (penalty scored); Carroll (penalty scored); Cooke (penalty missed)		(penalty missed) Lovejoy; (penalty scored) Murphy; (penalty scored) George; (penalty scored) Walters; (penalty scored) Gafa

November 9, 2012	Clemson	1–2 (a.e.t.)	Maryland	Boyds, MD
8:00 PM ET	Amirkhanian 24'; Clowes (yellow card) 28'	Report	Ambrose (yellow card) 38'; Mullins 83'; Robinson 103' (o.g.)	Stadium: Maryland SoccerPlex; Attendance: 5,981; Referee: Ted Unkel

=== ACC Championship ===
November 11, 2012	North Carolina	1–2	Maryland	Boyds, MD
12:00 PM ET	Rice (yellow card) 36'; Garcia (yellow card) 45'; Lovejoy 86'	Report	Edwards 11'; Tshuma 62'	Stadium: Maryland SoccerPlex; Attendance: 9,341; Referee: Fotis Bazakos

== See also ==
- Atlantic Coast Conference
- 2013 Atlantic Coast Conference men's soccer season
- 2013 NCAA Division I men's soccer season
- 2013 NCAA Division I Men's Soccer Championship
