= 2013 ACC tournament =

2013 ACC tournament may refer to:

- 2013 ACC men's basketball tournament
- 2013 ACC women's basketball tournament
- 2013 ACC men's soccer tournament
- 2013 ACC women's soccer tournament
- 2013 Atlantic Coast Conference baseball tournament
- 2013 Atlantic Coast Conference softball tournament
