= Patrick Mullins =

American soccer player

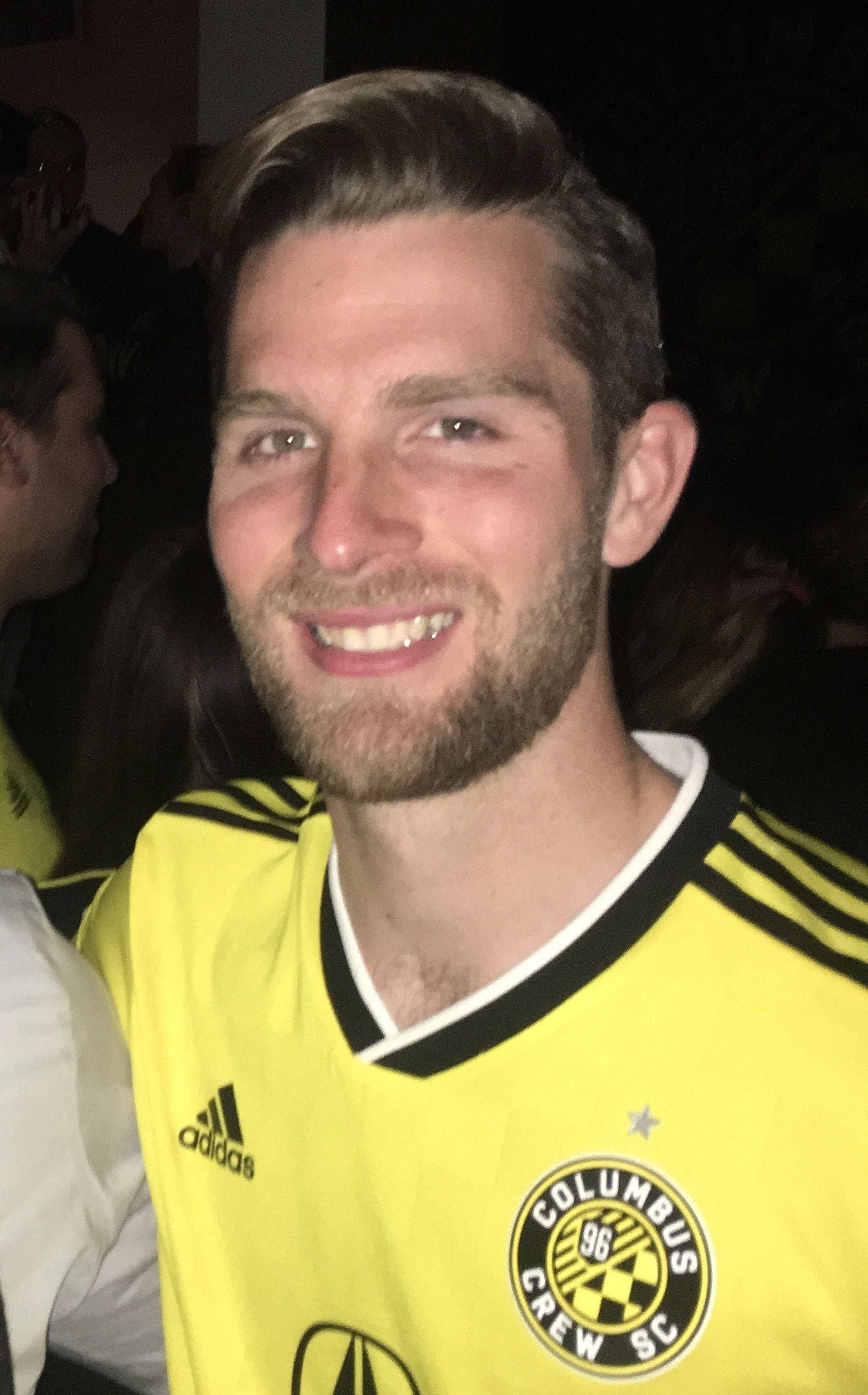
- Mullins at a Columbus Crew event in 2019

Personal information
- Full name: Patrick Michael Mullins
- Date of birth: February 5, 1992 (age 34)
- Place of birth: New Orleans, Louisiana, U.S.
- Height: 6 ft 1 in (1.85 m)
- Position: Forward

Youth career
- 1997–2010: Chicago Fire Juniors

College career
Years	Team	Apps	(Gls)
2010–2013	Maryland Terrapins	92	(47)

Senior career*
Years	Team	Apps	(Gls)
2007	Baton Rouge Capitals	5	(1)
2011–2013	New Orleans Jesters	24+	(14+)
2014	New England Revolution	21	(4)
2015–2016	New York City FC	31	(6)
2016–2018	D.C. United	44	(13)
2018–2019	Columbus Crew	19	(1)
2019–2021	Toronto FC	49	(3)
Total		193+	(42+)
- * Club domestic league appearances and goals

Patrick Michael Mullins (born February 5, 1992) is an American former professional soccer player. A left-footed forward, he was a two-time winner of the Hermann Trophy as the top men's college soccer player and was the leading scorer in NCAA Division I soccer in 2013. He scored 31 goals during an eight-season career in Major League Soccer (MLS), appearing with five different clubs.

Born in New Orleans, Mullins won two state championships and was the 2008 Louisiana Gatorade Player of the Year while at Jesuit High School. He played collegiately at Maryland, where he was a two-time All-American and helped the Terrapins to back-to-back appearances in the College Cup. Mullins was drafted in the first round of the 2014 MLS SuperDraft by New England Revolution, beginning an eight-year journeyman career during which he represented five MLS clubs. He played in MLS Cup 2014 during his rookie season with the Revolution, then joined New York City FC through the 2014 MLS Expansion Draft. Mullins scored six goals in their expansion season before being traded to D.C. United in the summer of 2016.

In a 2017 game against San Jose Earthquakes, Mullins became the first player in MLS history to score four goals in a single half. He was unable to lock down a starting spot with D.C. and was then traded midway through the 2018 season to Columbus Crew. Mullins scored one goal with the Crew in parts of two years before another trade brought him across the border to Toronto FC, where he played the final seasons of his career. He made 63 total appearances with Toronto, more than with any other club. Mullins scored his final goal in April 2021, during a 2021 CONCACAF Champions League match against León, and retired from professional soccer at the end of the 2021 season. Including his time with semi-professional clubs Baton Rouge Capitals and New Orleans Jesters early in his career, Mullins played more than 200 senior games.

== Early life ==
Mullins was born in New Orleans, Louisiana. He and his family lost their home after Hurricane Katrina hit the city in 2005, forcing them to take refuge in Brookhaven, Mississippi and Baton Rouge, Louisiana. He returned to New Orleans for high school, attending Jesuit High School and playing soccer for the Blue Jays for three years. Mullins won two state titles with Jesuit, was named all-LHSAA twice, and was the Louisiana Player of the Year as a junior.

Mullins played club soccer for Chicago Fire Juniors, and its predecessor clubs, from 1997 to 2010. He won four state championships and participated in a camp with the United States U17s in 2008. He was recognized as the no. 31 recruit in the nation by TopDrawerSoccer.com and committed to play collegiately for coach Sasho Cirovski and the Maryland Terrapins, part of a recruiting class that also included Marquez Fernandez and Sunny Jane.

=== Baton Rouge Capitals ===
While still in high school, Mullins appeared for Baton Rouge Capitals during the 2007 PDL season. He played in five matches for the Premier Development League (PDL) expansion club, scoring one goal on five shots.

== College and amateur ==
On March 2, 2010, it was announced that Mullins had officially signed to play college soccer at the University of Maryland; he had already graduated high school early and enrolled at Maryland for the spring semester. He made his collegiate debut on September 10, coming off the bench as the Terrapins drew 1–1 with Boston College. Four days later, Mullins scored his first collegiate goal in a 3–0 victory over Loyola. He also scored on his NCAA Tournament debut, tallying the final goal of a 4–0 victory against Penn in the second round. Mullins finished the season with five goals from 21 appearances and was named as the Atlantic Coast Conference Men's Soccer Freshman of the Year. As a sophomore, Mullins converted from winger to striker and went on to start all 21 matches for the Terrapins. He scored in the season-opener against St. John's, scored four times in a three-match stretch in early September, and notched five goals in the season's first eight matches. He finished the season with six goals and three assists and was named second team All-Atlantic Coast Conference (ACC), one of six Terrapins to be named to an all-conference team.

Mullins stepped into a starring role as a junior, appearing 24 times and helping the Terrapins qualify for the College Cup for the first time since 2008. His first goal of the season came three matches in, as part of a 6–0 defeat of California; he wouldn't go more than two games between goals for the remainder of the season. Notably, Mullins tallied a brace in victories against Georgia State on September 24 and Lehigh on October 23. He also scored in a 2–2 draw with Clemson on October 27 that clinched the ACC regular season title for the Terrapins. Mullins scored six postseason goals, two in the ACC Tournament and four in the NCAA Tournament, as Maryland made a run to the 2012 College Cup. Although Mullins scored and converted his penalty kick in the national semifinals against Georgetown, the Terrapins were eliminated at that round. Mullins finished the season with 17 goals and 10 assists. He was named MVP of the ACC Tournament, first team All-ACC, and as the ACC Offensive Player of the Year. On January 11, 2013, he was named as the recipient of the Hermann Trophy as the top collegiate soccer player in the country.

Despite rumors that he would sign a Generation Adidas contract and enter the 2013 MLS SuperDraft, Mullins decided to stay at Maryland for his senior season. He scored the first goal of the season for the Terrapins, part of a 3–3 draw with Stanford on August 30. Mullins notched two goals in a game five times, notably in a victory over fourth-ranked Clemson in mid-September. Although he didn't score in the ACC Tournament, he provided an assist against Clemson in the semifinals and was named as the tournament MVP for the second consecutive year. He also was named first team All-ACC, alongside fellow Terrapin Dan Metzger. In the 2013 College Cup, Mullins scored five goals as the Terrapins made a run to the national championship game. Although he scored the opening goal against Notre Dame, the Fighting Irish won the title with a 2–1 victory. He finished the season with 19 goals and eight assists from 26 appearances. On January 10, 2014, Mullins won his second consecutive Hermann Trophy, making him the fourth male in NCAA history to win the award in back-to-back seasons. He concluded his collegiate career with 47 goals from 92 appearances with the Terrapins.

=== New Orleans Jesters ===
Following his freshman season at Maryland, Mullins returned to the PDL and to his home state of Louisiana by joining New Orleans Jesters. In the 2011 season, he appeared in nine matches for the club, tallying five goals and two assists. Those statistics included a brace in a 2–1 victory over Mississippi Brilla on June 8 and the game-winner in a 2–1 victory over his former club, Baton Rouge Capitals, on June 26.

Mullins rejoined New Orleans after his sophomore collegiate season and became a regular starter in 2012. Although the club again failed to qualify for the playoffs or the U.S. Open Cup, he tallied seven goals in 12 appearances. Mullins found success against the Texas-based clubs in the Mid South Division, with his tally including goals that June against Texas Dutch Lions and Austin Aztex.

As the Jesters moved to the National Premier Soccer League in 2013, Mullins returned for his third and final season with the club. He scored in the Jesters' first NPSL game, a 3–1 victory against Mississippi Storm on May 21. Mullins added a goal against Knoxville Force in late June, ending his three seasons in New Orleans as one of the leading scorers in Jesters history.

== Club career ==
=== New England Revolution ===
Mullins was selected 11th overall in the 2014 MLS SuperDraft by New England Revolution. He was one of two Maryland products selected in the first round, alongside Schillo Tshuma. Mullins made his professional debut in the season opener, starting on the right wing against Houston Dynamo. He would be replaced at halftime by Jerry Bengtson, however, as New England fell to a 4–0 defeat. Mullins would not see the field for the next seven matches, but was reinstated to the starting lineup for a trip to Toronto FC on May 3. He scored his first professional goal in that match, helping the Revolution to a 2–1 victory, and kicked off a streak of four goals in four consecutive matches. He would score just once more over the course of the season, however, coming on June 19 in a victory over Richmond Kickers in the U.S. Open Cup. Against LA Galaxy in MLS Cup 2014, Mullins started on the bench before replacing Charlie Davies in the 72nd minute. Seven minutes after coming on, he provided an assist on the match-tying goal by Chris Tierney, although the Revolution would go on to lose 2–1 after extra time. Mullins finished his first professional season with five goals in 26 total appearances.

=== New York City FC ===
On December 10, 2014, Mullins was selected in the 2014 MLS Expansion Draft by New York City FC. He was the fourth pick of the draft and one of two Revolution players to be selected, alongside Tony Taylor. Mullins was an unused substitute in the club's inaugural match, but made his debut for NYCFC in their home opener against his former club, New England. After entering as a substitute in the 84th minute, it took less than a minute for Mullins to slot home his first goal for the club, helping NYCFC pick up a 2–0 victory. He found the back of the net five more times during the regular season, including the final goal of a 4–4 draw with Toronto FC on July 12. Although Mullins scored in consecutive games in mid-September, NYCFC finished their inaugural season 12 points outside of the playoffs; Mullins ended the year with six goals from 25 appearances.

Following the 2015 season, Mullins was one of 10 New York City FC players who had their contract options exercised by the club, sealing his return to the Bronx for a second campaign. However, Mullins fell out of favor in 2016, starting just twice through the middle of July. After only eight appearances on the season, including one in the U.S. Open Cup, he was traded to D.C. United on July 20. Mullins departed NYCFC with 33 appearances and six goals across parts of two seasons.

=== D.C. United ===
Mullins was traded to D.C. United on July 20, 2016, in exchange for general and targeted allocation money and an international roster slot. Three days after the trade, he made his debut for the capital club, coming on as a 58th-minute substitute in a 4–1 defeat against Toronto FC. Mullins was handed his first D.C. start against Montreal Impact on July 31 and promptly scored his first goal for the club: his header, off an assist from collegiate teammate Taylor Kemp, helped D.C. earn a 1–1 draw. Mullins would finish the season on a tear, with eight goals in 15 appearances following the trade. That tally included his first career hat trick, part of a 6–2 victory over Chicago Fire on August 27. Following the season, he was signed to a contract extension by the club; although exact terms were not disclosed, it was confirmed to be a multi-year extension.

Although D.C. United was expecting Mullins to continue his form from the end of 2016, much of his 2017 season was lost to injury. He missed more than a month at the start of the year due to a pulled hamstring, underwent surgery for a torn meniscus in early June, and didn't return to full fitness until mid-August. Mullins appeared just nine times from March through July, but then appeared in all but one match for the remainder of the season. On September 23, at home against San Jose Earthquakes, Mullins set an MLS record: he scored four goals in the second half of D.C.'s 4–0 victory, the first time a player had scored four times in a half in league history. Additionally, the 31-minute span was the quickest four-goal tally in league history. After adding a goal four days later against New York Red Bulls, Mullins finished the season with five goals from 20 appearances.

Ahead of the 2018 season, D.C. United acquired Darren Mattocks to push Mullins for the starting striker spot. Mattocks would eventually win the role, relegating Mullins to the bench to begin the year. He appeared 11 times for D.C. through the end of June, but nine of those appearances came off the bench and he was unable to find the back of the net. When Wayne Rooney signed for D.C. United on June 28, Mullins became surplus to requirements. He was traded to Columbus Crew SC on July 11, ending his tenure in D.C. with 13 goals from 46 appearances.

=== Columbus Crew SC ===
On July 11, 2018, Mullins was traded to Columbus Crew SC in exchange for $150,000 in targeted allocation money. He made his debut for the club ten days later, playing 22 minutes off the bench in Crew SC's 3–2 victory over Orlando City. On July 28, as Columbus defeated New York Red Bulls by a 3–2 scoreline, Mullins marked a pair of firsts: his first start for Crew SC as well as his first goal for the club. He appeared eleven more times for Columbus in 2018, including three appearances during the club's playoff run. He didn't score in any of those matches, however, and finished his first half-season in central Ohio with one goal from 13 appearances.

Mullins remained as the Crew's backup striker headed into the 2019 season, remaining behind Gyasi Zardes on the depth chart. He started in just two matches, once in March and once in June, with both appearances coming while Zardes was on international duty. After appearing 11 times without scoring a goal, Mullins was traded to Toronto FC on July 11. He finished his stint in Columbus with one goal and one assist from 24 appearances in all competitions.

=== Toronto FC ===
Exactly one year after being acquired by the Crew, Mullins was traded to Toronto FC in exchange for forward Jordan Hamilton, $50,000 in targeted allocation money, and a 2019 International Roster Spot. Mullins made his club debut on July 20, starting and playing 45 minutes in a 3–1 defeat against Houston Dynamo. He attempted two shots before being replaced by Jozy Altidore. On August 10, Mullins scored his first goal for Toronto, helping the Reds to a 1–1 draw against Orlando City. He went on to appear in both legs of the 2019 Canadian Championship Final and appeared three times in the playoffs as Toronto made a run to MLS Cup 2019, although he was an unused substitute in the final. Mullins made 15 appearances and scored three goals in all competitions and had his contract option picked up by the club following the season.

In his second season in Toronto, Mullins appeared off the bench in each of the club's first two games before the season was halted due to the COVID-19 pandemic. He played just one time at the MLS is Back Tournament, but scored against his former club, New York City FC, in the round of 16. Although he missed two weeks in September with a hamstring strain, Mullins added a goal and an assist through the rest of the season. He finished the year with two goals and one assist from 18 appearances in all competitions, helping Toronto qualify for the MLS Cup Playoffs and the 2020 Canadian Championship final.

After a difficult 2021 season, where he failed to score a single goal in league play, Mullins had his contract option declined by Toronto.

== Personal life ==
Mullins' brother, Andrew, was the 2007 Louisiana Player of the Year at Jesuit and won two state titles with the Blue Jays; both were marks that Patrick matched two years later. The brothers, along with their father Walter, split their loyalties: Patrick is a Chelsea supporter, while Andrew supports Manchester United and Walter is a fan of Liverpool.

Mullins graduated from Maryland with a double major in communications and American studies. While in school, he authored "Mullins' Musings", a blog focused on "soccer, team building and leadership". He is friends with Justin Portillo, a fellow New Orleans native and professional soccer player.

== Career statistics ==
Appearances and goals by club, season and competition
Club	Season	League			Cup (Note: Includes the U.S. Open Cup and Canadian Championship)		Continental		Other		Total	
Club	Season	Division	Apps	Goals	Apps	Goals	Apps	Goals	Apps	Goals	Apps	Goals
Baton Rouge Capitals	2007	PDL	5	1	—		—		—		5	1
New Orleans Jesters	2011	PDL	9	5	—		—		—		9	5
New Orleans Jesters	2012	PDL	12	7	—		—		—		12	7
New Orleans Jesters	2013	NPSL	3+	2+	—		—		—		3+	2+
New Orleans Jesters	Total		24+	14+	0	0	0	0	0	0	24+	14+
New England Revolution	2014	MLS	21	4	2	1	—		3 (Note: Appearance(s) in the MLS Cup Playoffs)	0	26	5
New York City FC	2015	MLS	24	6	1	0	—		—		25	6
New York City FC	2016	MLS	7	0	1	0	—		0	0	8	0
New York City FC	Total		31	6	2	0	0	0	0	0	33	6
D.C. United	2016	MLS	14	8	0	0	0	0	1	0	15	8
D.C. United	2017	MLS	20	5	0	0	—		—		20	5
D.C. United	2018	MLS	10	0	1	0	—		0	0	11	0
D.C. United	Total		44	13	1	0	0	0	1	0	46	13
Columbus Crew SC	2018	MLS	10	1	0	0	—		3	0	13	1
Columbus Crew SC	2019	MLS	9	0	2	0	—		—		11	0
Columbus Crew SC	Total		19	1	2	0	0	0	3	0	24	1
Toronto FC	2019	MLS	8	2	4	1	0	0	3	0	15	3
Toronto FC	2020	MLS	16	1	0	0	—		2 (Note: One appearance and one goal in the MLS is Back Tournament knockout stage, one appearance in the MLS Cup Playoffs)	1	18	2
Toronto FC	2021	MLS	25	0	1	0	4 (Note: Appearance(s) in the CONCACAF Champions League)	1	—		30	1
Toronto FC	Total		49	3	5	1	4	1	5	1	63	6
Career total			193+	42+	12	2	4	1	12	1	221+	46+

== Honors ==
Maryland

- ACC Men's Soccer Tournament: 2010, 2012, 2013
- Atlantic Coast Conference (regular season): 2012, 2013

Individual

- Atlantic Coast Conference Men's Soccer Freshman of the Year: 2010
- TopDrawerSoccer.com All-Rookie Second Team: 2010
- Second team All-ACC: 2011
- ACC Men's Soccer Offensive Player of the Year: 2012
- Greater New Orleans Outstanding Male Amateur Athlete: 2012–13
- Hermann Trophy: 2012, 2013
- First Team All-America: 2012, 2013
- Soccer America Men's Player of the Year: 2012, 2013
- NSCAA First Team All-America: 2012, 2013
- First team All-ACC: 2012, 2013
- ACC Men's Soccer Tournament MVP: 2012, 2013
- College Cup All-Tournament Team: 2012, 2013
