= Chad Riley =

American soccer player and coach

Personal information
- Date of birth: c. 1982 (age 43–44)
- Place of birth: Houston, Texas, United States
- Position: Midfielder

College career
Years	Team	Apps	(Gls)
2000–2003	Notre Dame	78	(10)

Managerial career
- 2004: Oberlin (Assistant Coach)
- 2005: St. John's (Assistant Coach)
- 2006–2011: Notre Dame (Assistant Coach)
- 2012: Dartmouth (Assistant Coach)
- 2013–2017: Dartmouth
- 2018–present: Notre Dame

Chad Edward Riley (born c. 1982) is a former soccer player and current head coach of the University of Notre Dame. He previously played for Notre Dame before coaching at Oberlin, St. John's, and Notre Dame as an assistant. He also previously was the head coach at Dartmouth.

== Playing career ==
Riley was a midfielder for the Notre Dame Fighting Irish from 2000 to 2003. The team had a 53–23–9 record during his four seasons as a player. The team also made 3 NCAA Tournament berths and won two Big East titles during that time. Riley was a four time all-Big East award winner, being named to the third team twice, the second team once, and the all-rookie team in his freshman season. Riley scored 10 goals and recorded 32 assists in 78 appearances during his playing time with the Fighting Irish. Riley was the team leader in assists in 2000, 2001, and 2002.

== Coaching career ==
Riley began his coaching career at Oberlin as an assistant coach. In his one-season, 2004, the team finished with a 9–8–3 record. He was hired as the assistant coach at St. John's in 2005. While at St. John's the team finished with an 11–6–5 and reached the third round of the NCAA Tournament. In 2006, his alma mater, Notre Dame hired him as assistant coach. While at Notre Dame, his teams finished with a 71–37–21 record, made 5 NCAA Tournament appearances, and reached two NCAA Quarterfinals. In 2012, Riley was hired as an assistant coach at Dartmouth. After just one year he was promoted to his first head coaching job. Riley led the Big Green to success in his time as head coach. During his tenure the team finished with an overall record of 51–26–14, won four Ivy League championships, and made four NCAA Tournament appearances. He was also Ivy League coach of the year in three of his five seasons at the helm of Dartmouth. In 2018, he was hired back at Notre Dame as the head coach. Riley succeeded seventeen year Notre Dame coach Bobby Clark, who he played under while at Notre Dame. Riley's tenure as head coach has seen Notre Dame finish under .500 only once so far. He has also led the Fighting Irish to four NCAA appearances in six seasons, including a run to the 2021 College Cup., and a repeat trip in 2023. Riley also led the team to a tournament ACC title in 2021., and a regular season title in 2023.

=== Head coaching record ===
Record table
Season	Team	Overall	Conference	Standing	Postseason
Dartmouth (Ivy League) (2013–2017)
2013	Dartmouth	6–4–7	1–6–0	8th	
2014	Dartmouth	12–5–2	5–1–1	T-1st	NCAA second round
2015	Dartmouth	12–6–1	6–1–0	1st	NCAA second round
2016	Dartmouth	9–5–5	5–1–1	T-1st	NCAA second round
2017	Dartmouth	12–3–2	6–0–1	1st	NCAA second round
Dartmouth:		51–23–17	23–9–3		
Notre Dame (Atlantic Coast Conference) (2018–present)
2018	Notre Dame	11–7–3	4–3–1	3rd (Coastal)	NCAA quarterfinal
2019	Notre Dame	10–8–1	3–5–0	T-3rd (Coastal)	NCAA first round
2020	Notre Dame	8–9–0	3–7–0	N/A	
2021	Notre Dame	14–5–5	4–2–2	3rd (Coastal)	NCAA College Cup Semifinal
2022	Notre Dame	8–7–2	3–4–1	5th (Coastal)	
2023	Notre Dame	13–3–6	6–0–2	1st (Coastal)	NCAA College Cup Final
2024	Notre Dame	7–5–5	3–3–2	T-8th	
Notre Dame:		71–44–22	26–24–8		
Total:		122–67–39			
National champion Postseason invitational champion Conference regular season champion Conference regular season and conference tournament champion Division regular season champion Division regular season and conference tournament champion Conference tournament champion
