= Mike Noonan =

American soccer coach and former player

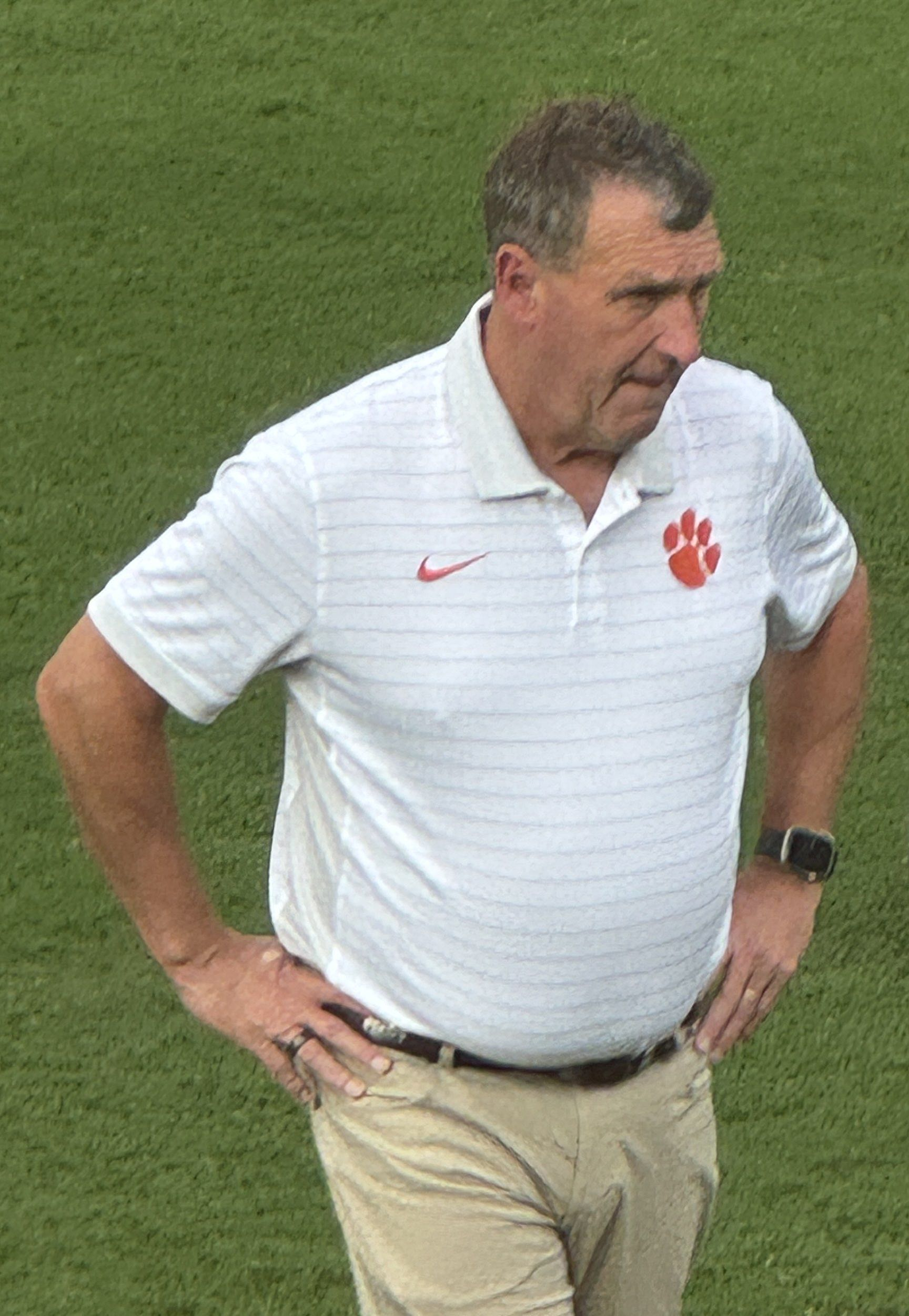
- Noonan coaching the Clemson Tigers in 2026

Personal information
- Full name: Michael Noonan
- Date of birth: June 30, 1961 (age 65)
- Place of birth: Westport, Connecticut, U.S.
- Positions: Midfielder; defender

College career
Years	Team	Apps	(Gls)
1979–1982	Middlebury Panthers		

Senior career*
Years	Team	Apps	(Gls)
- Louisville Thunder (indoor)
1986–1988	Fort Wayne Flames (indoor)	37	(2)

Managerial career
- 1983: Bates Bobcats (assistant)
- 1986–1989: Vermont Catamounts (assistant)
- 1989–1990: Wheaton Lyons
- 1991–1994: New Hampshire Wildcats
- 1995–2009: Brown Bears
- 2010–: Clemson Tigers
- * Club domestic league appearances and goals

Michael Noonan (June 30, 1961) is an American retired soccer player who played professionally in the American Indoor Soccer Association and is currently the head coach of the Clemson University men's soccer team.

== Playing career ==
Noonan attended Middlebury College, playing on the men's soccer team from 1979 to 1982. He was a 1981 and 1982 Division III NCAA First Team All American. Noonan played for the Louisville Thunder in the American Indoor Soccer Association. In 1986, he signed with the Fort Wayne Flames where he spent two seasons. In 2017, Noonan was inducted into the Middlebury College Athletics Hall of Fame for his playing time there.

== Coaching career ==
In 1989, Noonan was hired as head coach of the Wheaton College men's soccer team. The team had a 4–11–0 record his first season, but he took them to a 12–5–1 record his second season. This led to a move to the University of New Hampshire where he coached from 1991 to 1994. In 1995, he became head coach of the Brown University's men's soccer team. Noonan compiled a 160–77–31 record with ten NCAA post-season tournament appearances in fifteen seasons with the Bears. On January 5, 2010, Clemson University announced they had hired Noonan as head coach of the men's soccer team. Noonan enjoyed some success with the Tigers. In 2014, Noonan led the Tigers to ACC regular season and tournament titles. In 2015 he led them to the College Cup Final, but ultimately lost to Stanford. In 2016, Clemson finished runners up in the ACC Tournament and made it to the Quarterfinals of the NCAA tournament. In 2017, Noonan obtained his 300th career coaching win in a game against South Carolina. This includes wins from his time as assistant coach. In 2021, he led Clemson to an NCAA National Championship in a 2–0 win over University of Washington. In 2023, Noonan lead his Clemson Tigers to a 2–1 win over the University of Notre Dame Fighting Irish for his second National Championship at Clemson.

== Head coaching record ==
Record table
Season	Team	Overall	Conference	Standing	Postseason
Wheaton Lyons () (1989–1990)
1989	Wheaton	4–11–0			
1990	Wheaton	12–5–1			
Wheaton:		16–16–1			
New Hampshire Wildcats (North Atlantic Conference) (1991–1994)
1991	New Hampshire	10–6–4			
1992	New Hampshire	9–7–3			
1993	New Hampshire	14–5–0			
1994	New Hampshire	15–5–2			NCAA Division I First Round
New Hampshire:		48–23–9			
Brown Bears (Ivy League) (1995–2009)
1995	Brown	16–4–0	6–1–0	T–1st	NCAA Division I Third Round
1996	Brown	8–5–4	1–3–3	T–6th	
1997	Brown	11–6–1	5–1–1	T–1st	NCAA Division I First Round
1998	Brown	12–2–3	5–0–2	T–1st	NCAA Division I First Round
1999	Brown	13–5–0	5–2–0	T–2nd	NCAA Division I Second Round
2000	Brown	13–6–1	7–0–0	1st	NCAA Division I Quarterfinals
2001	Brown	7–7–2	5–1–1	T–1st	
2002	Brown	5–8–4	1–4–2	7th	
2003	Brown	10–4–3	6–0–1	1st	NCAA Division I First Round
2004	Brown	8–7–2	4–3–0	T–2nd	
2005	Brown	11–5–2	5–1–1	T–1st	NCAA Division I Second Round
2006	Brown	11–5–3	3–2–2	3rd	NCAA Division I Second Round
2007	Brown	15–2–1	7–0–0	1st	NCAA Division I First Round
2008	Brown	9–7–1	3–4–0	5th	
2009	Brown	11–3–6	5–2–0	2nd	NCAA Division I Second Round
Brown:		160–76–33	68–24–13		
Clemson Tigers (Atlantic Coast Conference) (2010–present)
2010	Clemson	5–8–4	2–4–2	7th	
2011	Clemson	8–8–2	4–4–0	7th	
2012	Clemson	6–9–5	3–2–3	T–4th	
2013	Clemson	11–7–3	5–4–2	T–4th	NCAA Division I First Round
2014	Clemson	12–7–3	5–2–1	T–1st	NCAA Division I Third Round
2015	Clemson	17–3–4	6–1–1	2nd (Atlantic)	NCAA Division I Runner-up
2016	Clemson	14–4–5	4–1–3	3rd (Atlantic)	NCAA Division I Quarterfinal
2017	Clemson	12–6–1	4–4–0	3rd (Atlantic)	NCAA Division I Second Round
2018	Clemson	7–9–1	2–6–0	6th (Atlantic)	
2019	Clemson	18–2–2	6–1–1	1st (Atlantic)	NCAA Division I Quarterfinal
2020	Clemson	14–3–3	7–3–2	1st (Atlantic)	NCAA Division I Round of 16
2021	Clemson	16–5–2	5–3–0	1st (Atlantic)	NCAA Division I Champions
2022	Clemson	13–7–1	3–4–1	4th (Atlantic)	NCAA Division I Second Round
2023	Clemson	15–3–5	4–2–2	2nd (Atlantic)	NCAA Division I Champions
2024	Clemson	15–3–4	5–2–1	2nd	NCAA Division I Third Round
2025	Clemson	8–6–3	4–2–2	T–4th	NCAA Division I First Round
Clemson:		191–90–48	69–45–21		
Total:		415–205–91			
National champion Postseason invitational champion Conference regular season champion Conference regular season and conference tournament champion Division regular season champion Division regular season and conference tournament champion Conference tournament champion
