= Indiana–Notre Dame men's soccer rivalry =

College soccer rivalry in the U.S.

- Indiana Hoosiers Notre Dame Fighting Irish
- Sport: College soccer
- First meeting: September 14, 1973; Indiana 5–1 Notre Dame
- Latest meeting: August 29, 2024; Indiana 2-2 Notre Dame
- Next meeting: August 20, 2026
- Stadiums: Bill Armstrong Stadium (IU); Alumni Stadium (UND)

Statistics
- Total meetings: 50
- All-time series: Indiana, 34–11–5
- Largest victory: Indiana 11–1 Notre Dame (1974)
- Longest win streak: 11, Indiana (1973–1987)
- Longest unbeaten streak: 11, Indiana (1973–1987)
- Current win streak: Tied
- Current unbeaten streak: 8, Indiana (2017–)

The Indiana–Notre Dame men's soccer rivalry is a college soccer rivalry between the Indiana Hoosiers men's soccer team and the Notre Dame Fighting Irish men's soccer program. The two programs are two of the most successful college soccer programs in the state of Indiana.

== History ==
Historically, the rivalry has favored Indiana, who were dominant from the 1970s to the 1990s over Notre Dame. During this period of time, the Hoosiers and Irish played 22 matches against each other, with the Hoosiers having a 20–1–1 record over the Irish. Since the turn of the 21st century, the series has been much more competitive, as Indiana has a 11–10–1 advantage of Notre Dame.

Indiana began their varsity soccer program in 1973, while Notre Dame began theirs in 1977. The matches held in 1973 and 1974 were between Indiana's varsity team and the Notre Dame club team. For Notre Dame's records, the first match between the two programs was October 22, 1978 where Indiana won 7–1, while the first match in Indiana's records was September 14, 1973 where Indiana won 5–1. Indiana won the first ten matches of the series before Notre Dame earned their win in 1987.

Locations of Indiana and Notre Dame

In 1994, the programs met for the first time in the NCAA Division I Men's Soccer Tournament. The match, held in Bloomington, saw Indiana win 1–0 over Notre Dame.

Over the 2010s, the series has become seen as a more fierce rivalry, as players and coaches have called the match up between the two sides as an emotional affair. In 2018, Fred Glass, Indiana athletic director, called Notre Dame one of Indiana soccer's "biggest rivals".

On November 30, 2018, the programs met for the fifth time in the NCAA Tournament, where Indiana came out victorious, 1–0. The match was played in front of 5,159 fans, making it the eighth largest crowd in the history of Bill Armstrong Stadium.

== Results ==
Indiana victories	Notre Dame victories

No.	Date	Location	Winner	Score
1	September 14, 1973	South Bend, IN	Indiana	5–1
2	September 13, 1974	Bloomington, IN	Indiana	11–1
3	October 22, 1978	Bloomington, IN	Indiana	7–1
4	October 28, 1979	South Bend, IN	Indiana	4–0
5	September 28, 1980	Bloomington, IN	Indiana	4–0
6	October 25, 1981	South Bend, IN	Indiana	2–0
7	September 24, 1982	Bloomington, IN	Indiana	4–0
8	September 25, 1983	South Bend, IN	Indiana	4–0
9	September 23, 1984	Bloomington, IN	Indiana	5–1
10	September 22, 1985	South Bend, IN	Indiana	4–0
11	September 12, 1986	Bloomington, IN	Indiana	2–0
12	September 13, 1987	South Bend, IN	Notre Dame	4–3 ^{OT}
13	September 9, 1988	Bloomington, IN	Tie	1–1 ^{OT}
14	September 29, 1989	South Bend, IN	Indiana	3–1
15	September 27, 1991	South Bend, IN	Indiana	4–1 ^{OT}
16	September 25, 1992	Bloomington, IN	Indiana	3–0
17	September 24, 1993	South Bend, IN	Indiana	3–0
18	September 23, 1994	Bloomington, IN	Indiana	2–0
19	November 20, 1994 (Note: NCAA Tournament game.)	Bloomington, IN	Indiana	1–0 ^{OT}
20	September 22, 1995	South Bend, IN	Indiana	4–2 ^{OT}
21	September 27, 1996	Bloomington, IN	Indiana	3–0
22	September 2, 1997	South Bend, IN	Indiana	4–0
23	October 17, 2001	Bloomington, IN	Notre Dame	1–0
24	November 27, 2002	Bloomington, IN	Indiana	1–0
25	September 18, 2003	South Bend, IN	Notre Dame	1–0 ^{2OT}
26	September 15, 2004	Bloomington, IN	Indiana	2–0

No.	Date	Location	Winner	Score
27	October 26, 2005	South Bend, IN	Indiana	3–0
28	November 22, 2005	Bloomington, IN	Notre Dame	2–0
29	September 3, 2006	Bloomington, IN	Notre Dame	5–4 ^{OT}
30	October 17, 2007	South Bend, IN	Indiana	3–2
31	October 16, 2008	Bloomington, IN	Indiana	3–1
32	October 14, 2009	South Bend, IN	Indiana	3–0
33	October 6, 2010	Bloomington, IN	Notre Dame	2–1
34	August 27, 2011	South Bend, IN	Tie	0–0 ^{2OT}
35	September 26, 2012	Bloomington, IN	Notre Dame	1–0
36	November 25, 2012	South Bend, IN	Indiana	2–1 ^{OT}
37	October 2, 2013	South Bend, IN	Notre Dame	2–0
38	October 22, 2014	Bloomington, IN	Indiana	1–0
39	August 30, 2015	Bloomington, IN	Notre Dame	1–0
40	October 4, 2016	South Bend, IN	Notre Dame	4–0
41	September 26, 2017	Bloomington, IN	Indiana	1–0
42	September 11, 2018	South Bend, IN	Indiana	2–1 ^{OT}
43	November 30, 2018	Bloomington, IN	Indiana	1–0
44	September 17, 2019	Bloomington, IN	Tie	1–1
45	August 27, 2021	South Bend, IN	Indiana	3–2 ^{OT}
46	October 5, 2022	Bloomington, IN	Indiana	1–0
47	August 24, 2023	South Bend, IN	Tie	1–1
48	December 2, 2023	South Bend, IN	Notre Dame	(5)–(4) ^{PKs}
49	August 29, 2024	Bloomington, IN	Tie	2–2
50	September 7, 2025	South Bend, IN	Indiana	1–0
Series: Indiana leads 34–11–5

== Honors ==
Team	NCAA	Conference Tournament	Conference Regular Season	Total
Indiana	8	13	15	36
Notre Dame	1	3	7	11
Combined	9	16	22	47
