= Notre Dame–UCLA men's basketball rivalry =

American college basketball rivalry

Notre Dame–UCLA rivalry
- Notre Dame Fighting Irish UCLA Bruins
- First meeting: December 20, 1950; UCLA 68, Notre Dame 60
- Latest meeting: December 14, 2019; Notre Dame 75, UCLA 61

Statistics
- Total meetings: 50
- Most wins: UCLA
- All-time series: UCLA leads, 29–21
- Largest victory: UCLA, 114–56 (1971)
- Longest win streak: UCLA, 7 (1980–1983)
- Current win streak: Notre Dame, 1 (2019–present)

Locations of Notre Dame and UCLA

The University of Notre Dame Fighting Irish and University of California, Los Angeles Bruins have a rivalry in men's basketball. They also play occasionally in football.

== Series history ==
UCLA had a basketball rivalry with Notre Dame that started when Digger Phelps was the Notre Dame coach and John Wooden was the UCLA coach. UCLA and Notre Dame played a home-and-home meeting for several seasons in the 1970s and 1980s, which is otherwise uncommon outside conference play. In the late 1980s and early 1990s, the schools met once annually. This rivalry existed from the desire of the Notre Dame athletic department to schedule the top schools for intersectional competition, much as the Notre Dame–USC football rivalry. UCLA and Notre Dame played 42 times between 1966 and 1995, and the height of the rivalry was when Notre Dame ended UCLA's consecutive game winning streak at 88 on January 19, 1974. UCLA also broke a 60-game Notre Dame winning streak in South Bend.

Former UCLA head coach Ben Howland had since scheduled Notre Dame four times: in 2004, 2005, 2008, and 2009. Through the 2019-20 season, UCLA leads the all-time series 29–21.

== Game results ==
| Notre Dame victories | UCLA victories |

| No. | Date | Location | Winner | Score |
|---|---|---|---|---|
| 1 | December 20, 1952 | East Lansing | Notre Dame | 68–60 |
| 2 | December 16, 1960 | Los Angeles | UCLA | 85–54 |
| 3 | December 23, 1966 | Los Angeles | UCLA | 96–67 |
| 4 | December 21, 1967 | Los Angeles | UCLA | 114–63 |
| 5 | December 7, 1968 | Notre Dame | UCLA | 88–75 |
| 6 | January 3, 1970 | Los Angeles | UCLA | 108–77 |
| 7 | January 23, 1971 | Notre Dame | Notre Dame | 89–82 |
| 8 | December 22, 1971 | Los Angeles | UCLA | 114–56 |
| 9 | January 29, 1972 | Notre Dame | UCLA | 57–32 |
| 10 | December 23, 1972 | Los Angeles | UCLA | 82–56 |
| 11 | January 27, 1973 | Notre Dame | UCLA | 82–63 |
| 12 | January 19, 1974 | Notre Dame | Notre Dame | 71–70 |
| 13 | January 26, 1974 | Los Angeles | UCLA | 94–75 |
| 14 | December 21, 1974 | Los Angeles | UCLA | 85–72 |
| 15 | January 25, 1975 | Notre Dame | Notre Dame | 84–78 |
| 16 | January 3, 1976 | Los Angeles | UCLA | 86–70 |
| 17 | January 24, 1976 | Notre Dame | Notre Dame | 95–85 |
| 18 | December 11, 1976 | Los Angeles | Notre Dame | 66–63 |
| 19 | January 23, 1977 | Notre Dame | UCLA | 70–65 |
| 20 | December 10, 1977 | Los Angeles | Notre Dame | 69–66 |
| 21 | January 22, 1978 | Notre Dame | Notre Dame | 75–73 |
| 22 | December 9, 1978 | Los Angeles | Notre Dame | 81–78 |
| 23 | February 11, 1979 | Notre Dame | UCLA | 56–52 |
| 24 | December 11, 1979 | Notre Dame | Notre Dame | 77–74 |
| 25 | January 19, 1980 | Los Angeles | Notre Dame | 80–73 |
| 26 | November 29, 1980 | Los Angeles | UCLA | 94–81 |

| No. | Date | Location | Winner | Score |
|---|---|---|---|---|
| 27 | February 8, 1981 | Notre Dame | UCLA | 51–50 |
| 28 | December 5, 1981 | Notre Dame | UCLA | 75–49 |
| 29 | February 7, 1982 | Los Angeles | UCLA | 48–47 |
| 30 | December 4, 1982 | Notre Dame | UCLA | 65–64 |
| 31 | January 30, 1983 | Los Angeles | UCLA | 59–53 |
| 32 | December 3, 1983 | Notre Dame | UCLA | 51–47 |
| 33 | February 3, 1985 | Los Angeles | Notre Dame | 53–52 |
| 34 | January 18, 1986 | Notre Dame | Notre Dame | 74–64 |
| 35 | January 24, 1987 | Los Angeles | UCLA | 63–59 |
| 36 | February 14, 1988 | Notre Dame | Notre Dame | 73–66 |
| 37 | January 14, 1989 | Los Angeles | Notre Dame | 82–79 |
| 38 | December 17, 1989 | Notre Dame | Notre Dame | 86–84 |
| 39 | December 8, 1990 | Los Angeles | UCLA | 99–91 |
| 40 | February 22, 1992 | Notre Dame | Notre Dame | 84–71 |
| 41 | January 31, 1993 | Los Angeles | UCLA | 68–65 |
| 42 | February 5, 1994 | Notre Dame | Notre Dame | 79–63 |
| 43 | February 5, 1995 | Los Angeles | UCLA | 92–55 |
| 44 | December 20, 1995 | Notre Dame | UCLA | 83–58 |
| 45 | February 28, 2004 | Los Angeles | Notre Dame | 75–60 |
| 46 | February 27, 2005 | Notre Dame | UCLA | 75–65 |
| 47 | February 7, 2009 | Los Angeles | UCLA | 89–63 |
| 48 | December 19, 2009 | Notre Dame | Notre Dame | 84–73 |
| 49 | December 8, 2018 | Los Angeles | UCLA | 65–62 |
| 50 | December 14, 2019 | Notre Dame | Notre Dame | 75–61 |
Series: UCLA leads 29–21
