= Washington Catholic Athletic Conference Boys' Lacrosse =

The Washington Catholic Athletic Conference (WCAC) Boys' lacrosse league in the US began crowning a champion in 1987. The league comprises ten teams from Catholic high schools of the Roman Catholic Archdiocese of Washington and the Roman Catholic Diocese of Arlington. The schools are all located in the Washington metropolitan area. Only three teams have won multiple championships since the league's inception - DeMatha Catholic High School (18), Gonzaga College High School (14) and St. John's College High School (3).

== Championships ==
School	Championships
DeMatha	18
Gonzaga	14
St. John's	3
Bishop Ireton	1
Paul VI	1
St. Mary’s Ryken	1

== Past Champions ==
Year	Champion	Runner-up	Score	Venue
2026	Paul VI	St. John’s	10-8	Cooper Field
2025	DeMatha	St. Mary's Ryken	15-7	Cooper Field
2024	Gonzaga	St. John's	11-10	Cooper Field
2023	St. John's	Paul VI	9-5	Ludwig Field
2022	St. John's	Gonzaga	15-11	Ludwig Field
2021	N/A			
2020	N/A			
2019	Gonzaga	St. John's	8-6	Ludwig Field
2018	Gonzaga	Paul VI	10-7	Ludwig Field
2017	St. John's	Gonzaga	7-5	Ludwig Field
2016	Gonzaga	DeMatha	14-5	Ludwig Field
2015	Gonzaga	Paul VI	12-3	Ludwig Field
2014	Gonzaga	St. Johns's	16-6	Ludwig Field
2013	Gonzaga	Paul VI	13-11	Ludwig Field
2012	Gonzaga	DeMatha	10-3	Ludwig Field
2011	Gonzaga	Good Counsel	10-8	Ludwig Field
2010	Gonzaga	DeMatha	9-8 OT	
2009	DeMatha	St. Mary's Ryken	9-7	Ludwig Field
2008	DeMatha	Good Counsel	18-3	
2007	St. Mary's Ryken	DeMatha	13-12	Ludwig Field
2006	DeMatha	Gonzaga	8-7	George Mason
2005	DeMatha	Gonzaga		George Mason
2004	DeMatha	Gonzaga	13-7	Blair H.S.
2003	DeMatha	Gonzaga	10-9 OT	Blair H.S.
2002	DeMatha	St. John's	17-8	Blair H.S.
2001	DeMatha	Gonzaga	11-4	
2000	DeMatha	Gonzaga	19-3	Good Counsel
1999	DeMatha	Gonzaga		Paul VI
1998	Gonzaga	Good Counsel	20-8	
1997	Gonzaga	DeMatha	11-8	Paul VI
1996	DeMatha	Gonzaga	13-12	
1995	DeMatha		13-12	
1994	DeMatha	Paul VI	6-2	
1993	Gonzaga			
1992	Gonzaga			
1991	DeMatha			
1990	DeMatha			
1989	DeMatha			
1988	DeMatha			
1987	Bishop Ireton			

== Past Players of the Year ==
Year	Player	School
2026	Gilmore, Gavin	Paul VI
2025	James, Owen	The Heights
2024	Draley, John	St. John's
2023	Weller, Jackie	St. John's
2022	Figueiras, Riley	St. John's
2021	NA	
2020	NA	
2019	Hall, Dane	St. John's
2018	Myers, Jack	Gonzaga
2017	Hinton, Colin	St. John's
2016	Myers, Avery	Gonzaga
2015	Monahan, Timmy	Gonzaga
2014	Torain, Greyson	DeMatha
2013		
2012	Reed, Connor	Gonzaga
2011		
2010	May, Chris	Gonzaga
2009		
2008		
2007		
2006		
2005		
2004		
2003	Callahan, Brendan	Gonzaga
2002		
2001		
2000		
1999		
1998		
1997		
1996		
1995		
1994		
1993		
1992		
1991		
1990		
1989		
1988		
1987		

== Past Coaches of the Year ==
Year	Player	School
2026	Schwartz, Jeff	Paul VI
2025	Lombardo, Jon	St. Mary's Ryken
2024	King, Jeff	Gonzaga
2023	Speaks, Wes	St. John's
2022	Speaks, Wes	St. John's
2021	NA	
2020	NA	
2019	Giblin, Kevin Speaks, Wes	Bishop O'Connell St. John's
2018	O'Neil, Casey	Gonzaga
2017	Speaks, Wes	St. John's
2016		
2015	Beck, Ryan Durkin, Matt	Good Counsel Good Counsel
2014	Morrison, Scott	DeMatha
2013	Abood, Dick	Bishop O'Connell
2012	O'Neill, Casey	Gonzaga
2011	O'Neill, Casey	Gonzaga
2010	O'Neill, Casey	Gonzaga
2009		
2008		
2007		
2006		
2005		
2004		
2003	Doughty, Dave	Gonzaga
2002		
2001		
2000		
1999		
1998		
1997		
1996		
1995		
1994		
1993		
1992		
1991		
1990		
1989		
1988		
1987		

== All WCAC Teams ==
=== 2026 ===
First Team
Player	School	Position
Holland, Heath	Paul VI	A
Costa, JM	Gonzaga	A
James, Brendan	The Heights	A
Demarinis, Drew	Good Counsel	M
Gilmore, Gavin	Paul VI	M
Cruz, Dylan	Good Counsel	M
Corkhill, Adam	Paul VI	SSDM
Wheatley, Joe	Paul VI	LSM
Kivett, Dylan	DeMatha	FO
Cantor, Coby	St. John's	FO
Moschella, Nate	Gonzaga	FO
Devine, Declan	Good Counsel	D
Shearer, Josh	Paul VI	D
James, Jayden	St. John's	D
Kovacs, Will	Paul VI	G

Second Team
Player	School	Position
Mackey, Will	Good Counsel	A
Chi, Eddie	St. John's	A
Sirios, Colton	Paul VI	A
Douglas, Wyatt	St. John's	M
Weber, Cam	Gonzaga	M
DuFor, Brendan	St. John's	M
Spahr, Chase	Good Counsel	M
Smith, Kaleb	St. Mary's	M
Strong, Ellis	St. John's	SSDM
Strycharz, Chris	St. John's	LSM
Muldrew, Braylin	McNamara	FO
Sinclair, Cooper	Good Counsel	D
Matan, Michale	DeMatha	D
Cronin, Mac	St. John's	D
Montgomery, Nick	Gonzaga	G

Honorable Mention

Bishop Ireton: Jude Cook, Landon Koch, Cooper Donaghy
Bishop McNamara: Alex Selmon, Dewayne Mosley, Andrew Brooks
Bishop O'Connell: Ryan Milligan, Wyatt Turbok, Kai Molter
DeMatha: Will Grace, Mikey Principi, Eli Surpin
Good Counsel: Ben Pensy, Jake Bendler, Griffin West
Gonzaga: Jack DiMaio, Tommy Leland, Joe Tuohey
St John's: Ryder McGowan, Wills McLaughlin, Ryan Inzer
Paul VI: Braiden Galaida, Daniel Gutierrez, Wilton Taliaferro
St Mary's Ryken: Ty Jameson, Zach Moreland, John Stark
The Heights: Joe Mitchell, Seamus Seaman, Will Wright

=== 2025 ===
First Team
Player	School	Position
Stark, Drew	St. Mary's	A
Costa, JM	Gonzaga	A
Beachley, Matthew	DeMatha	A
Mackey, Will	Good Counsel	A
Oliver, Caleb	Gonzaga	M
Church, Nick	DeMatha	M
Cruz, Dylan	Good Counsel	M
Strong, Ellis	St. John's	SSDM
-	-	-
Chesteen, Zac	Paul VI	LSM
McCarthy, Bobby	Gonzaga	FO
Cicotello, Gaetano	Gonzaga	D
Hedderich, Josh	St. Mary's	D
McKelvy, Landon	DeMatha	D
James, Owen	The Heights	D
James, Jayden	St. John's	D
Wittlinger, Cole	DeMatha	G

Second Team
Player	School	Position
Mancinelli, Anthony	St. John's	A
Holland, Heath	Paul VI	A
James, Brendan	The Heights	A
-	-	-
Offut, John	St. John's	M
Gilmore, Gavin	Paul VI	M
DeMarinis, Drew	Good Counsel	M
DiMaio, Jack	Gonzaga	SSDM
Corkhill, Adam	Paul VI	SSDM
Strycharz, Chris	St. John's	LSM
Kivett, Dylan	DeMatha	FO
Devine, Declan	Good Counsel	D
Taylor, Will	DeMatha	D
Bailey, Matthew	St. John's	D
-	-	-
-	-	-
Inzer, Ryan	St. John's	G

Honorable Mention

Bishop Ireton: Vinnie Schievart, Tyler Richards, Jude Cook
Bishop McNamara: Braylin Muldrew, Alex Selmon, Brian Cariaga
Bishop O'Connell: Ryan Ferguson, Ryan Milligan, Jimmy Cribb
DeMatha: Will Grace, Bobby Komins, Zac Robertson
Good Counsel: Ben Pensy, Jackson Manning, Chase Spahr
Gonzaga: Kevin Kane, Tommy Leland, Joe Tuohey
St John's: Brendan DuFour, Ryder McGowan, Charlie Ball
Paul VI: Connor Pinto, Colton Sirois, Joshua Shearer
St Mary's Ryken: Delaney Garner, Jack Wallace, Jake Olsen
The Heights: Joe Mitchell, Paul Anglade, Luke Chambers

=== 2024 ===
First Team
Player	School	Position
Gardiner, Johnny	Gonzaga	A
Fowler, Freddy	Gonzaga	A
Beachley, Matthew	DeMatha	A
Draley, John	St. John's	M
Offut, John	St. John's	M
Demarinis, Drew	Good Counsel	M
Gardiner, James	Gonzaga	SSDM
Chesteen, Zac	Paul VI	LSM
McCarthy, Bobby	Gonzaga	FO
Cicotello, Gaetano	Gonzaga	D
Weller, Henry	St. John's	D
Brick, Jack	Good Counsel	D
James, Owen	The Heights	D
Inzer, Ryan	St. John's	G

Second Team
Player	School	Position
Mancinelli, Anthony	St. John's	A
Baik, Ryan	Good Counsel	A
Stark, Drew	St. Mary's	A
Bath, Robert	Gonzaga	M
Gilmore, Gavin	Paul VI	M
		-
Troy, Jimmy	Good Counsel	SSDM
Westbrooks, James	DeMatha	LSM
Manning, Jackson	Good Counsel	FO
		-
Kehoe, Ryan	Paul VI	D
McKelvy, Landon	DeMatha	D
James, Jayden	St. John's	D
Kane, Kevin	Gonzaga	G

Honorable Mention

Bishop Ireton: Vinnie Scheivert, Cooper Metz, Tyler Richards
Bishop McNamara:
Bishop O'Connell:
DeMatha: Nick Church, Will Taylor, Dylan Adams
Good Counsel: Noah Geis, Jack Hampton, William Mackey
Gonzaga: Michael Michaelis, Carter Cadin, Cody Hobson
St John's: Charlie Ball, Chris Strycharz, Matthew Bailey
Paul VI: Connor Pinto, Luca Signorello, Will Cramp
St Mary's Ryken: Jack Wallace, Delaney Garner, Josh Hedderich
The Heights: Brendan James, Chase Stichman, Jason Agwamba

=== 2023 ===
First Team
Player	School	Position
Gardiner, Johnny	Gonzaga	A
Duenkel, Ryan	St. John's	A
Han, Matthew	Paul VI	A
Love, Parker	Paul VI	LSM
Gardiner, James	Gonzaga	SSDM
Weller, Jackie	St. John's	FO
Songer, Michael	St. John's	D
Murphy, Nathan	Paul VI	D
Brick, Jack	Good Counsel	D
Draley, John	St. John's	M
Leland, Jack	Gonzaga	M
Parker, Graham	DeMatha	M
Fyock, Caleb	St. John's	G

Second Team
Player	School	Position
Reidy, Ethan	Paul VI	A
Baik, Ryan	Good Counsel	A
Beachly, Matthew	DeMatha	A
Cicotello, Gaetano	Gonzaga	LSM
Sims, Nick	DeMatha	LSM
Chesteen, Zak	Paul VI	SSDM
Giunchi, Gtrant	Paul VI	FO
Rienzo, Matthew	Gonzaga	D
Cunningham, Austin	Gonzaga	D
Hackett, Luke	DeMatha	D
Offut, John	St. John's	M
Cramp, William	Paul VI	M
Monahan, Declan	Gonzaga	G

Honorable Mention

Bishop Ireton: Vinnie Schievert
Bishop McNamara:
Bishop O'Connell:
DeMatha: Miles Lancaster, Malik Wood, Michael Gloekler
Good Counsel: John Gerold, Noah Gies,
Gonzaga: Freddy Fowler, Ryan Pels, Robert Bath
St John's: Henry Weller, Riley Chi-Onn, Connor Shannon
Paul VI: Matthew Dineen, Ryan Kehoe, Henry Fleckner
St Mary's Ryken:
The Heights:

=== 2022 ===
First Team
Player	School	Position
Gardiner, Johnny	Gonzaga	A
Duenkel, Ryan	St. John's	A
Wood, Malik	DeMatha	A
Haley, Mac	St. John's	A
Splaine, Ryan	Gonzaga	LSM
Bonavita, Tommy	Gonzaga	SSDM
Trujillo, Vinnie	St. John's	SSDM
Weller, Jackie	St. John's	FO
Checo, Richard	St. John's	D
Figueiras, Riley	St. John's	D
Cunningham, Austin	Gonzaga	D
Rhoa, Luke	St. John's	M
Signorello, Marco	Paul VI	M
Parker, Graham	DeMatha	M
Gross, Tommy	The Heights	G
Fyock, Caleb	St. John's	G

Second Team
Player	School	Position
Kelly, Gavin	St. John's	A
Boyle, Carson	Paul VI	A
Matan, James	Gonzaga	A
-	-	-
Mattingly, Ryder	St. John's	LSM
Hagerup, Leif	Gonzaga	SSDM
-	-	-
Kid, Johnny	Paul VI	FO
Hendrix, Dylan	DeMatha	D
Turner, Jared	Gonzaga	D
Murphy, Nate	Paul VI	D
McKelvy, Dylan	DeMatha	M
Draley, John	St. John's	M
Hobson, Cody	Gonzaga	M
Monahan, Declan	Gonzaga	G
-	-	-

3rd Team/Honorable Mention

Bishop Ireton: Ian Cook (3rd)
Bishop McNamara: Richard Johnson (3rd)
Bishop O'Connell: James Milligan (3rd)
DeMatha: Ryan Evans (3rd), Timmy Taylor (3rd), Miles Lancaster (3rd)
Good Counsel: John Gerold (3rd), Jack Brick (3rd)
Gonzaga: Charlie Wise (3rd), Brendan Lane (3rd)
St John's: Kevin Whitty (3rd)
Paul VI:
St Mary's Ryken: Garrett Brodfuehrer (3rd)
The Heights: Seamus Regan (3rd), Harrison Barley (3rd), Jack Hermes (3rd)

=== 2019 ===
First Team
Player	School	Position
Jacob Angelus	Paul VI	A
Kurt Bruun	Gonzaga	A
Cormac Giblin	O'Connell	A
TJ Haley	St. John's	A
Dane Hall	St. John's	M
PJ Zinsner	Gonzaga	M
Charlie O'Connor	Paul VI	M
Ben Finlay	Gonzaga	D
Harold Peters	DeMatha	D
Brandon Pierpont	St. Mary's	D
Sam Sweeney	Gonzaga	LSM
Quinton Young	St. John's	SSDN
Andrew O'Berry	Gonzaga	FO
Tim Marcille	Gonzaga	G

Second Team
Player	School	Position
Aidan Tolen	DeMatha	A
Brian Tregoning	Good Counsel	A
Peter Behrens	St. Mary's Ryken	A
Tucker Wardell	O'Connell	M
Brian Collins	Gonzaga	M
Patrick Saunders	Bishop Ireton	M
Michael Bath	Gonzaga	D
Riley Figueras	St. John's	D
Connor MacDonald	The Heights	D
Alex Figueras	St. Mary's	LSM
Billy Saffin	Paul VI	SSDM
Gavin Kline	Paul VI	FO
George Alvarez	St. John's	G

Honorable Mention Bishop Ireton:
Bishop McNamara:
Bishop O'Connell:
DeMatha:
Good Counsel:
Gonzaga:
St John's:
Paul VI:
St Mary's Ryken:
The Heights:

=== 2015 ===
First Team
Player	School	Position
Monahan, Timmy	Gonzaga	A
Lamb, Ryan	Paul VI	A
Short, Austin	St. Mary's	A
Puglise, Roman	Paul VI	M
Slater, Ridge	Gonzaga	M
Wilkerson, Jimmy	St. Mary's	M
Lavat, Gavin	DeMatha	SSDM
Fraser, Michael	DJO	LSM
McEvoy, Nick	Gonzaga	FO
Finlay, Ryan	Gonzaga	D
Jehelka, Troy	Paul VI	D
McIntyre, PJ	Good Counsel	D
Christopher, George	Gonzaga	G

Second Team
Player	School	Position
Flood, Gerald	St. John's	A
Howell, Mitchell	DeMatha	A
McCaleb, Luke	Gonzaga	A
Haase, Stephen	Good Counsel	M
Hogan, Cole	DJO	M
Myers, Avery	Gonzaga	M
Imbriale, Hunter	St. Mary's	LSM
Taylor, Zack	DeMatha	SSDM
Brugal, Luke	Paul VI	FO
Chastain, Henry	Gonzaga	D
Gyenis, Patrick	Paul VI	D
Hinton, Colin	St. John's	D
Strang, Luke	Good Counsel	G

Third Team/Honorable Mention

Bishop Ireton: Alex Duke, Ryan Verducci
Bishop O'Connell: Michael Armor
DeMatha: Dylan Stein, Ricky Koehler, Colin Kasner
Good Counsel: Tim Griffin, Josh McGovern, Ryan Lynch
Gonzaga: Sam Offutt, Richie Petibon, Luke Vassos
St John's: Mitch Mona, Eric Lane
Paul VI: Jackson Smith, Nick Ancona, Andrew Garstka, Taylor Redmond, Adam Baker
St Mary's Ryken: Chandler Dabbs, Brett Bell, Jacob Schoenick

=== 2014 ===
First Team
Player	School	Position
Monahan, Timmy	Gonzaga	A
Lamb, Ryan	Paul VI	A
Brisolari, Matt	DeMatha	A
O'Connor, Ryan	Paul VI	M
Slater, Ridge	Gonzaga	M
Torian, Greyson	DeMatha	M
Riehl, Colin	Gonzaga	SSDM
Smith, Austin	Good Counsel	LSM
Anderson, Jacob	St. John's	FO
Borda, Matt	Gonzaga	D
Jehelka, Troy	Paul VI	D
Surdick, Johnny	Dematha	D
Ramsey, Nick	Dematha	G

Second Team
Player	School	Position
Kelly, Joe	Bishop O'Connell	A
Najarian, Tyler	DeMatha	A
Petibon, Richie	Gonzaga	A
Pawela, Jacob	St. John's	M
Poulos, Pat	Good Counsel	M
Thompson, Brady	DeMatha	M
Fraser, Michael	Bishop O'Connell	LSM
Brainard, Greg	Paul VI	SSDM
Brugal, Luke	Paul VI	FO
Graham, Jack	Good Counsel	D
Hillenbrand, Steven	Paul VI	D
Schroeder, Bain	DeMatha	D
Szot, Dylan	Good Counsel	G

Honorable Mention

Bishop Ireton: Devon Reed, Joe Ready, Ryan Verducci, Mitchell Wooten, Jr.
Bishop O'Connell: Scott Rucks, Brian Stellwag, Justin Fitzsimmons, Kevin Tesch
DeMatha: James Jennings, Sean Doyle, Brad Peters, CJ Croxton
Good Counsel: Perry Stefanelli, Andrew Venezia, PJ McIntyre, Ryan Lynch
Gonzaga: Luke Vassos, George Christopher, Mark Anstead, Will Rock
St John's: Gerald Flood, Will Martin, Nate Williams, Nate Howard
Paul VI: Adam Baker, Patrick Gyenis, Roman Puglise, David Williamson
St Mary's Ryken: Garrett Egnaczyk, Jimmy Ludwick, Daniel Long, Patrick Snight

=== 2013 ===
First Team
Player	School	Position
Corboy, Alex	Gonzaga	A
Blondino, Nathan	St. Mary's	A
Murphy, Connor	Paul VI	A
Dennis, Romar	St. Mary's	M
Planning, Max	Gonzaga	M
Fitzpatrick, Joe	Gonzaga	M
Carpenter, Nick	Paul VI	SSDM
Walsh, Conor	St. Mary's	LSM
Golian, Tyler	Gonzaga	FO
Borda, Matt	Gonzaga	D
Slater, Jack	Gonzaga	D
Knowles, Tim	Paul VI	D
Farrell, Timmy	Gonzaga	G

Second Team
Player	School	Position
Myers, Pat	Gonzaga	A
Aunon, Logan	Paul VI	A
Partlow, Steve	DeMatha	A
Long, Daniel	St. Mary's	A
O'Connor, Ryan	Paul VI	M
Torain, Greyson	DeMatha	M
Lamb, Ryan	Paul VI	M
Poulos, Pat	Good Counsel	M
Spencer, Connor	Gonzaga	LSM
Haskin, Garrett	DeMatha	SSDM
Biagi, Will	Paul VI	FO
Hillenbrand, Steven	Paul VI	D
Brandenberg, Jack	St. Mary's	D
Williams, Nate	St. John's	D
Surdick, Johnny	DeMatha	D
Ramsey, Nick	DeMatha	G

Honorable Mention

Bishop Ireton: William Chastain, Alex Duke, Peter Kaye, Ryan Baier, Joseph Ready
Bishop McNamara: Michael Sensenig, Jimmy Strippy, Christian Andre, Dominic Pagliaro
Bishop O'Connell: Mike Ripa, Joe Kelly, Sean Hathaway, Michael Armor
DeMatha: Sean Doyle, Brady Thompson, Davis Hay, Mason Sutton
Good Counsel: Garrett Brower, Dylan Scott, Austin Smith, Joe Lynch
Gonzaga: Jimmy Kuzma, Daniel O'Berry, Michael Borda, Timmy Monahan
St John's: Jacob Anderson, RP Whitty, Jake Pawela, Gerald Flood
Paul VI: Chris Camarca, Bennett Lloyd, Zach Tuell, Kevin Hagan
St Mary's Ryken: Garrett Wayson, Matt Yates, Garrett Egnaczyk, Jimmy Ludwick

=== 2012 ===
First Team
Player	School	Position
Corboy, Alex	Gonzaga	A
Blondino, Nathan	St. Mary's	A
Murphy, Connor	Paul VI	A
Poulos, Luke	Good Counsel	M
Reed, Connor	Gonzaga	M
Summers, Connor	St. Mary's	M
Parker, Michael	DeMatha	SSDM
Powley, Ethan	Paul VI	LSM
Baumgardner, Ethan	Gonzaga	FO
Mendenhall, Troy	St. Mary's	D
Miller, Luke	Gonzaga	D
Sindell, Scott	DeMatha	D
Rosenberg, Justin	St. John's	G

Second Team
Player	School	Position
Fillet, Nolan	Good Counsel	A
Rogers, Jimmy	DeMatha	A
Whitcomb, Sean	Gonzaga	A
Bowman, Matt	Good Counsel	M
Dennis, Romar	St. Mary's	M
Torain, Greyson	DeMatha	M
O'Brien, Sean	Paul VI	SSDM
Nalls, Dennis	Gonzaga	LSM
Dabbs, Preston	St. Mary's	FO
Borda, Matt	Gonzaga	D
Brandenberg, Jack	St. Mary's	D
Hillenbrand, Steven	Paul VI	D
Ramsey, Nick	DeMatha	G

Honorable Mention

Bishop Ireton: William Chastain, Brandon Attiliis, Joe Darville, Albert Schibani
Bishop McNamara: Michael Sensenig, Romyel Santos
Bishop O'Connell: Mike Ripa, Sean Ohlhaver, Sean Hathaway and Maison Newenhouse
DeMatha: Matt Justice, Brady Thompson, Pat Hine, Bobby Bigelow
Good Counsel: Connor Reilly, Nick Buonomo, Jake Buzy, Graham Dabbs
Gonzaga: Jack Slater, Patrick Myers, Max Planning, Joe Fitzpatrick
St John's: Jacob Anderson, Chris Balla, Ryan Fornatora
Paul VI: Nick Carpenter, Zach Tuell, Tim Knowles
St Mary's Ryken: Garrett Wayson, Andrew Morgan, Hunter Wilson
