= Greg Dalby =

American soccer player (born 1985)

Personal information
- Full name: Gregory Mark Dalby
- Date of birth: November 3, 1985 (age 40)
- Place of birth: Newport Beach, California, United States
- Height: 6 ft 2 in (1.88 m)
- Position: Midfielder

College career
Years	Team	Apps	(Gls)
2003–2006	Notre Dame Fighting Irish		

Senior career*
Years	Team	Apps	(Gls)
2007–2008	Charleroi	0	(0)
2008–2009	Colorado Rapids	14	(0)
2009	→ Carolina RailHawks (loan)	1	(0)
2010–2011	Charlotte Eagles	40	(2)
Total		55	(2)

International career
2005	United States U20	16	(0)
2008	United States U23	4	(0)

Managerial career
- 2012–2014: Notre Dame Fighting Irish (assistant)
- 2015–2018: Davidson Wildcats (assistant)
- 2018–2022: Penn State Nittany Lions (assistant)
- 2023–2024: Oregon State Beavers
- 2025–: Air Force
- * Club domestic league appearances and goals

Greg Dalby (born November 3, 1985) is an American soccer coach and former player who is head coach of the Air Force Falcons men's soccer program.

== Youth and college career ==
Dalby was born in Newport Beach, California. For eight seasons through his teen years, he played on several San Diego clubs, including San Diego Soccer Club (1996–98), Rancho Bernardo Select (1996–98), La Jolla Nomads (1999–2000), San Diego Surf (1998–99, 2000–03). He was named the 2003 MVP of the San Diego Surf.

He attended Poway High School, near San Diego, where his skills were recognized at a national level. In his senior year, he was given the highest U.S. award for any high school player, the Gatorade National High School Player of the Year. He was chosen from hundreds of thousands of males for that award, and given a spot on the under-18 U.S. National Team. From there he was recruited by the University of Notre Dame, where he was team captain in the last two seasons. He was named first team All-American in 2005 and 2006.

== Club career ==
On January 12, 2007, Dalby was chosen by Colorado Rapids of Major League Soccer as the number 17 overall pick in the 2007 MLS SuperDraft. Instead of signing with the Rapids he chose to go to Europe to play.

Dalby had interest from Siena, Celtic and Preston North End but work permit issues led him to sign with Charleroi of the Belgian Jupiler League on August 5, 2007. He made no appearances for Charleroi and at end of the season was let go by the club. At that time he returned to the States and signed with Colorado. Dalby was waived by Colorado on March 19, 2010, and subsequently signed for Charlotte Eagles in the USL Second Division.

== International career ==
In 2005, Dalby was named captain of the United States U20 national team, who played that year in the FIFA World Youth Championship.
