= Ludwig Field =

Multipurpose athletic facility at the University of Maryland

Kehoe Track at Ludwig Field
- "Ludwig Field"
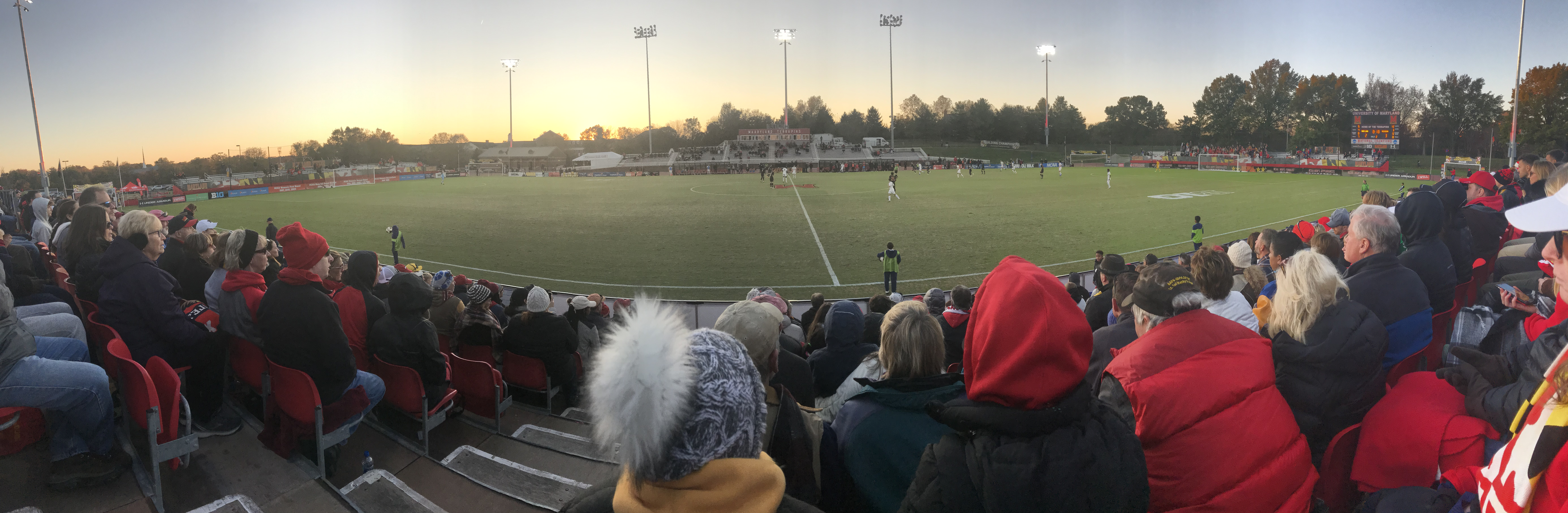
- The stadium during a soccer match in 2019
- Interactive map of Kehoe Track at Ludwig Field
- Full name: Kehoe Track at Ludwig Field
- Location: University Boulevard and Stadium Drive; University of Maryland; College Park, Maryland 20742
- Coordinates: 38°59′17.3″N 76°57′02.0″W
- Owner: University of Maryland
- Operator: University of Maryland
- Capacity: 7,000
- Surface: Soccer - Bermuda Grass; Track - All-Weather

Construction
- Opened: September 16, 1995; 31 years ago
- Cost: $2.5 million

Tenants
- Maryland Terrapins men's and women's soccer (NCAA) (1995-present); Maryland Terrapins track and field (NCAA) (1995-present)

Website
- umterps.com/ludwigfield

Ludwig Field (officially Kehoe Track at Ludwig Field) is a soccer stadium located on the campus of the University of Maryland (UMD) in College Park, Maryland. Since its opening in 1995, it has been the home of the Terrapin men's and women's soccer teams. The facility also includes a running track.

== History ==
Kehoe Track at Ludwig Field was dedicated on September 16, 1995 and is home to the University of Maryland's track and field and soccer teams. Built at a cost of $2.5 million, the facility is named after former Maryland track head coach and director of athletics Jim Kehoe, and Bob and Louise Ludwig, long-time supporters of Maryland Athletics.

A state-of-the-art scoreboard was added to the north end of the stadium in 2004. In 2007, a media press box was installed behind the west grandstand and an additional 1,500 seats were added to increase seating capacity from 4,500 to 6,000. In 2009, the capacity increased from 6,500 to 7,000.

Maryland men's soccer has won six Atlantic Coast Conference soccer championships (1996, 2002, 2008, 2010, 2012, 2013), two Big Ten Conference (B1G) championships (2014, 2016), and three NCAA national championships (2005, 2008, 2018) as tenants of Ludwig Field.

Ludwig Field hosted the WCAC Boys' Lacrosse League Championship game every May from 2011 through 2023.

== Attendance and fan support ==
Ludwig Field is one of the most well-attended college soccer facilities in the country. As of the 2019 season, Maryland has finished top-10 in attendance among all NCAA men's soccer programs each year since 2002. Maryland led the Big Ten Conference in attendance during its inaugural campaign, hosting three of the top-10 largest home crowds in the NCAA and finishing second in the nation in total home attendance (43,008) and fourth in the nation in average home attendance (2,688) in 2014.

The support for the men's soccer team includes a passionate fan group known as "The Crew." The Crew was formed in 2003 by student Mike Mastrantuono and a group of his friends, and has since grown to nearly 2000 fans. The first appearance of The Crew was at the first home game of the 2003 season, at which Maryland defeated UCLA 1-0.

Though the facility's capacity is officially listed at 7,000, Maryland routinely hosts larger crowds. On October 14, 2011, Ludwig Field hosted its then-largest crowd with 7,957 spectators for the Maryland men's soccer victory over Duke. That attendance record was broken on September 6, 2013 when 8,397 fans looked on as Maryland men's soccer, in its final Atlantic Coast Conference season, defeated Duke.
