= 2013 NCAA Division I men's soccer tournament =

Men's College Cup (semifinals & final)

Tournament details
- Country: United States
- Teams: 48

Final positions
- Champions: Notre Dame
- Runners-up: Maryland
- Semifinalists: New Mexico; Virginia

Tournament statistics
- Matches played: 47
- Goals scored: 122 (2.6 per match)
- Top goal scorer(s): Patrick Hodan; Patrick Mullins (5 goals)

Awards
- Best player: Harrison Shipp; Notre Dame (MOP off.); Zack Steffen; Maryland (MOP defense)

The 2013 NCAA Division I men's soccer tournament was the 55th edition of the tournament. The four team College Cup finals tournament was held at PPL Park in Chester, Pennsylvania on December 13 and 15, 2013. On December 15, Notre Dame defeated Maryland, 2–1, to win its first national title.

== Qualified Teams ==
A total of 48 teams qualified into the tournament proper, either automatically, or through an at-large bid that is determined by a selection committee. Each conference that field varsity soccer teams is awarded one automatic berth into the tournament. Depending on the conference, that automatic berth is either given the champions of the regular season, or the tournament that culminates the regular season. Twenty-two teams earn automatic bids into the tournament, while 26 enter through an at-large bid.

== Format ==
Like previous editions of the NCAA Division I Tournament, the tournament featured 48 participants out of a possible field of 198 teams. Of the 48 berths, 23 were allocated to the conference tournament or regular season winners. The remaining 25 berths were supposed to be determined through an at-large process based upon teams' Ratings Percentage Index (RPI) that did not win their conference tournament.

The NCAA Selection Committee also named the top sixteen seeds for the tournament, with those teams receiving an automatic bye into the second round of the tournament. The remaining 32 teams played in a single-elimination match in the first round of the tournament for the right to play a seeded team in the second round.

== Seeded teams ==
Seeded teams
Seed	School	Conference	Record	Berth type	NSCAA Ranking	RPI Ranking
1	UCLA	Pac-12	11–3–4	At-Large	1	1
2	Washington	Pac-12	14–1–4	Automatic ^{B}	2	2
3	Notre Dame	ACC	12–1–6	At-large	3	3
4	California	Pac-12	12–4–2	At-large	6	7
5	Maryland	ACC	13–3–5	Automatic ^{A}	4	4
6	Georgetown	Big East	13–4–2	At-large	8	6
7	New Mexico	C-USA	11–5–2	At-large	25	11
8	Virginia	ACC	10–5–5	At-large	9	9
9	Marquette	Big East	12–5–2	Automatic ^{A}	11	8
10	UC Santa Barbara	Big West	12–5–3	At-large	15	10
11	Michigan State	Big Ten	12–5–3	At-large	14	12
12	UC Irvine	Big West	14–4–2	Automatic ^{A}	13	13
13	Charlotte	Conference USA	12–5–3	Automatic ^{A}	23	14
14	Wake Forest	ACC	9–5–5	At-large	12	16
15	CSU Northridge	Big West	15–6–1	At-large	20	15
16	UMBC	America East	16–1–2	Automatic ^{A}	5	5

- Automatic ^{A} = Conference tournament winner.
- Automatic ^{B} =Conference regular season champion, conference has no tournament.

== Schedule ==
Round	Date
First round	November 21, 2013
Second round	November 24, 2013
Third round	December 1, 2013
Quarterfinals	December 6–7, 2013
College Cup: Semifinals	December 13, 2013
College Cup Final	December 15, 2013

== Bracket ==
=== Regional 1 ===
First round
Elon	1(4)
Clemson	1(1)
Connecticut	2
Quinnipiac	1
Akron	3
Indiana	2
Delaware	1
St. John's (OT)	2

Second round
Elon	0
1	UCLA	4
16	UMBC	2(2)
Connecticut	2(4)
Akron	0
9	Marquette (OT)	1
8	Virginia	2
St. John's	0

Third round
1	UCLA	3(4)
Connecticut	3(5)
9	Marquette	1
8	Virginia	3

Quarterfinals
Connecticut	1
8	Virginia	2

=== Regional 2 ===
First round
Penn	1(1)
Providence	1(3)
North Carolina	1
South Florida	0
Coastal Carolina	2
East Tennessee St.	0
Northwestern	2
Bradley (OT)	3

Second round
Providence	1
5	Maryland	3
12	UC Irvine	1
North Carolina	0
Coastal Carolina	1
13	Charlotte	0
4	California	3
Bradley	1

Third round
5	Maryland	1
12	UC Irvine	0
Coastal Carolina	0
4	California	1

Quarterfinals
5	Maryland	2
4	California	1

=== Regional 3 ===
First round
Wisconsin	1
Milwaukee	0
VCU	0
Navy	3
Louisville	0(3)
Denver	0(2)
Old Dominion	5
Drexel	1

Second round
Wisconsin	0
3	Notre Dame	4
14	Wake Forest	2
Navy	1
Louisville	0
11	Michigan State (OT)	1
6	Georgetown	3
Old Dominion	0

Third round
3	Notre Dame	4
14	Wake Forest	2
11	Michigan State	1
6	Georgetown	0

Quarterfinals
3	Notre Dame	2
11	Michigan State	1

=== Regional 4 ===
First round
William & Mary	2(2)
George Mason	2(4)
Penn State	1
St. Francis Brooklyn	0
Stanford	1(3)
Loyola Marymount	1(2)
Creighton	1
Seattle	2

Second round
George Mason	0
7	New Mexico	1
10	UC Santa Barbara	0
Penn State	1
Stanford	1
15	CSU Northridge	0
2	Washington	4
Seattle	2

Third round
7	New Mexico'	2
Penn State	0
Stanford	0
2	Washington	1

Quarterfinals
7	New Mexico	1
2	Washington	0

=== College Cup – PPL Park, Chester, Pennsylvania ===
National Semifinals; December 13
8	Virginia	1
5	Maryland	2
3	Notre Dame	2
7	New Mexico	0

National Championship; December 15
5	Maryland	1
3	Notre Dame	2

== Results ==
=== First round ===
November 21, 2013	Drexel	1–5	Old Dominion	Norfolk, Virginia
18:00 EST	Girard 69'	Report	Hopkinson 4', 16'; Stringer 17'; Miralrio 47'; Rivera 90'	Stadium: ODU Soccer Complex; Attendance: 555; Referee: Mark Gorak

November 21, 2013	Clemson	1–1 (a.e.t.) (1–4 p)	Elon	Elon, North Carolina
19:00 EST	Moreno 70'	Report	Waterman 59'	Stadium: Rudd Field; Attendance: 3,348; Referee: Andrew Chaplin
	Penalties
	McNamara (penalty scored); Casner (penalty missed); Dia (penalty missed)		Wescoe (penalty scored); Brace (penalty scored); Da Silva (penalty scored); Waterman (penalty scored)

November 21, 2013	Quinnipiac	1–2	Connecticut	Storrs, Connecticut
19:00 EST	Hinde 73'	Report	Zuniga 51'; Diouf 81'	Stadium: Morrone Stadium; Attendance: 2,780; Referee: Brian Dunn

November 21, 2013	Indiana	2–3	Akron	Akron, Ohio
19:00 EST	Lax 52'; Bushue 53'	Report	Brenes 7', 48'; Quinn 24'	Stadium: FirstEnergy Stadium; Attendance: 1,919; Referee: Chris Penso

November 21, 2013	St. John's	2–1 (a.e.t.)	Delaware	Newark, Delaware
19:00 EST	Camara 18'; Rouse 99'	Report	Delgado 89'	Stadium: Delaware Mini Stadium; Attendance: 1,123; Referee: Lou Labbadia

November 21, 2013	Providence	1–1 (a.e.t.) (3–1 p)	Penn	Philadelphia, Pennsylvania
19:00 EST	Arboleda 23'	Report	Neumann 10'	Stadium: Rhodes Field; Attendance: 712
	Penalties
	Steeves (penalty missed); Gressel (penalty scored); Baumann (penalty scored); Naglestad (penalty scored)		Lacroix (penalty scored); Neumann (penalty missed); Baker (penalty missed); Hayward (penalty missed)

November 21, 2013	South Florida	0–1	North Carolina	Chapel Hill, North Carolina
19:00 EST		Report	Holness 4'	Stadium: Fetzer Field; Attendance: 1,336; Referee: Carmen Serbio

November 21, 2013	East Tennessee State	0–2	Coastal Carolina	Conway, South Carolina
19:00 EST		Report	Camargo 17'; Štourač 32'	Stadium: CCU Soccer Field; Attendance: 643; Referee: Jonathan Glover

November 21, 2013	St. Francis (Brooklyn)	0–1	Penn State	University Park, Pennsylvania
19:00 EST		Report	Dennis 37'	Stadium: Jeffrey Field; Attendance: 507; Referee: Ian Bongaardt

November 21, 2013	George Mason	2–2 (a.e.t.) (4–2 p)	William & Mary	Williamsburg, Virginia
19:00 EST	Mulgrew 34'; Sever 72'	Report	Patel 36'; Eskay 79'	Stadium: Martin Family Stadium; Attendance: 1,109; Referee: Mark Kadlecik
	Penalties
	Arjona (penalty scored); Herstek (penalty scored); Sever (penalty scored); Mulgrew (penalty missed); Miller (penalty scored)		Smith (penalty missed); Perez (penalty scored); Patel (penalty scored); West (penalty missed)

November 21, 2013	Denver	0–0 (a.e.t.) (2–3 p)	Louisville	Louisville, Kentucky
19:00 EST		Report		Stadium: Cardinal Park Stadium; Attendance: 765; Referee: Shane Butler
	Penalties
	Chapleski (penalty scored); Dunk (penalty missed); Bolden (penalty missed); Kordistos (penalty missed); Remman (penalty scored)		Moore (penalty scored); McCaffrey (penalty missed); Foxhoven (penalty scored); Keller (penalty missed); Ockford (penalty scored)

November 21, 2013	Navy	3–0	VCU	Richmond, Virginia
19:00 EST	Sanchez 68'; Fries 71', 76'	Report		Stadium: Sports Backers Stadium; Attendance: 993; Referee: Bill Dittmar

November 21, 2013	Milwaukee	0–1	Wisconsin	Madison, Wisconsin
20:00 EST		Report	Prince 13'	Stadium: McClimon Complex; Attendance: 1,473; Referee: Dimitar Chavdarov

November 21, 2013	Bradley	3–2 (a.e.t.)	Northwestern	Evanston, Illinois
20:00 EST	S. Davis 7'; Wojcik 27', 97'	Report	Boxall 12'; Wilson 79'	Stadium: Lakeside Field; Attendance: 619; Referee: Keith Angel

November 21, 2013	Seattle	2–1	Creighton	Omaha, Nebraska
20:00 EST	Gonzalez 31', 72'	Report	Makh 15'	Stadium: Morrison Stadium; Attendance: 584; Referee: Edvin Jurisevic

November 21, 2013	Loyola Marymount	1–1 (a.e.t.) (2–3 p)	Stanford	Stanford, California
22:00 EST	Perez 88'	Report	Batteer 90'	Stadium: Cagan Stadium; Attendance: 744; Referee: Frank Anderson
	Penalties
	Nitti (penalty scored); Felix (penalty missed); Perez (penalty missed); De Rada (penalty scored); Hunsicker (penalty missed)		Koval (penalty missed); Kovar (penalty missed); Vincent (penalty scored); Morris (penalty scored); Hutchins (penalty scored)

=== Second round ===
November 24, 2013	Old Dominion	0–3	#6 Georgetown	Washington, DC
13:00 EST		Report	Seiler 12'; Goodman 59'; Muyl 87'	Stadium: North Kehoe Field; Attendance: 505; Referee: Brian Dunn

November 24, 2013	St. John's	0–2	#8 Virginia	Charlottesville, Virginia
13:00 EST		Report	Zinkhan 35'; Bird 63'	Stadium: Klöckner Stadium; Attendance: 627; Referee: Mark Kadlecik

November 24, 2013	Louisville	0–1 (a.e.t.)	#11 Michigan State	East Lansing, Michigan
13:00 EST		Report	Kreutz 106'	Stadium: DeMartin Soccer Complex; Attendance: 400; Referee: Ben Trevino

November 24, 2013	Bradley	1–3	#4 California	Berkeley, California
16:30 EST	Wojcik 47'	Report	Sundly 20', 57'; Birnbaum 35'	Stadium: Edwards Stadium; Attendance: 1,413; Referee: Ali Hicock

November 24, 2013	Providence	1–3	#5 Maryland	College Park, Maryland
17:00 EST	Towler 69'	Report	Sauers 7'; Mullins 70' (pen.); Pace 87'	Stadium: Ludwig Field; Attendance: 1,105; Referee: John McCloskey

November 24, 2013	North Carolina	0–1	#12 UC Irvine	Irvine, California
17:00 EST		Report	Santana 90'	Stadium: Anteater Stadium; Attendance: 1,133; Referee: Ioannis Estevez

November 24, 2013	Navy	1–2	#14 Wake Forest	Winston-Salem, North Carolina
17:00 EST	Dubyoski 32'	Report	Okoli 27'; Greensfelder 53'	Stadium: Spry Stadium; Attendance: 756; Referee: Peter Dhima

November 24, 2013	Connecticut	2–2 (a.e.t.) (4–2 p)	#16 UMBC	Catonsville, Maryland
17:00 EST	Larin 47'; Diouf 74'	Report	Caltabiano 61'; Caringi 77'	Stadium: Retriever Soccer Park; Attendance: 892; Referee: Rob Sibiga
	Penalties
	Bradley (penalty scored); Karppinen (penalty missed); Larin (penalty scored); Diouf (penalty scored); Beso (penalty scored)		Kansaye (penalty scored); Caltabiano (penalty scored); Dacres (penalty missed); Caringi (penalty missed)

November 24, 2013	Akron	0–1 (a.e.t.)	#9 Marquette	Milwaukee, Wisconsin
18:00 EST		Report	Navarro 100'	Stadium: Valley Fields; Attendance: 543; Referee: Brent Sorg

November 24, 2013	Wisconsin	0–4	#3 Notre Dame	Notre Dame, Indiana
19:00 EST		Report	Cicciarelli 7'; H. Shipp 22', 65'; Hodan 55'	Stadium: Alumni Field; Attendance: 489; Referee: Pawel Wydra

November 24, 2013	Coastal Carolina	1–0	#13 Charlotte	Charlotte, North Carolina
19:00 EST	Garbanzo 5'	Report		Stadium: Transamerica Field; Attendance: 1,001; Referee: Chris Penso

November 24, 2013	George Mason	0–1	#7 New Mexico	Albuquerque, New Mexico
19:00 EST		Report	Rogers 83'	Stadium: UNM Soccer Complex; Attendance: 1,584; Referee: Younes Marrakchi

November 24, 2013	Seattle	2–4	#2 Washington	Seattle, Washington
20:00 EST	Hanson 72'; Roberts 72'	Report	Jones 28'; Heard 48'; Roldan 57'; Robertson 66'	Stadium: Husky Soccer Stadium; Attendance: 3,100; Referee: Josh Wilkens

November 24, 2013	Penn State	1–0	#10 UC Santa Barbara	Santa Barbara, California
21:00 EST	Maloney 78'	Report		Stadium: Harder Stadium; Attendance: 4,420; Referee: Alex Gorin

November 24, 2013	Stanford	1–0	#15 CSU Northridge	Northridge, California
22:00 EST	Taylor 20'	Report		Stadium: Matador Soccer Field; Attendance: 1,048; Referee: Daniel Radford

November 24, 2013	Elon	0–4	#1 UCLA	Los Angeles, California
23:00 EST		Report	Chavez 12', 54'; Sofia 22'; Simmons 31'	Stadium: Drake Stadium; Attendance: 852; Referee: Miguel Chicas

=== Third round ===
December 1, 2013	#9 Marquette	1–3	#8 Virginia	Charlottesville, Virginia
13:00 EST	Nortey 53'	Report	Thomsen 24'; Madison 47'; Wharton 54'	Stadium: Klöckner Stadium; Attendance: 1,126; Referee: Edvin Jurisevic

December 1, 2013	#11 Michigan State	1–0	#6 Georgetown	Washington, DC
13:00 EST	Montague 28'	Report		Stadium: North Kehoe Field; Attendance: 1,819; Referee: John McCloskey

December 1, 2013	Coastal Carolina	0–1	#4 California	Berkeley, California
16:30 EST		Report	Sundly 65'	Stadium: Edwards Stadium; Attendance: 1,683; Referee: Alex Gorin

December 1, 2013	#12 UC Irvine	0–1	#5 Maryland	College Park, Maryland
17:00 EST		Report	Mullins 32'	Stadium: Ludwig Field; Attendance: 1,337; Referee: Mark Kadlecik

December 1, 2013	#14 Wake Forest	2–4	#3 Notre Dame	Notre Dame, Indiana
19:00 EST	Gamble 12'; Ibikunle 52'	Report	Hodan 14'; Ibikunle 42' (o.g.); Panken 70'; H. Shipp 74'	Stadium: Alumni Field; Attendance: 486; Referee: Hilario Grajeda

December 1, 2013	Penn State	0–2	#7 New Mexico	Albuquerque, New Mexico
19:00 EST		Report	Fisher 54'; McGovern 57'	Stadium: UNM Soccer Complex; Attendance: 3,347; Referee: Frank Anderson

December 1, 2013	Stanford	0–1	#2 Washington	Seattle, Washington
20:00 EST		Report	Lange 85'	Stadium: Husky Soccer Stadium; Attendance: 2,690; Referee: Younes Marrakchi

December 1, 2013	Connecticut	3–3 (a.e.t.) (5–4 p)	#1 UCLA	Los Angeles, California
20:00 EST	Larin 35', 70'; Awuah 58'	Report	Vobejda 12'; Stolz 13' (pen.), 61'	Stadium: Drake Stadium; Attendance: 1,521; Referee: Ian Anderson
	Penalties
	Bradley (penalty scored); Karppinen (penalty missed); Larin (penalty scored); Diouf (penalty scored); Beso (penalty scored); Sanchez (penalty scored)		Iloski (penalty scored); Chavez (penalty scored); Zerboni (penalty scored); Stolz (penalty missed); Vale (penalty scored); Muñoz (penalty missed)

=== Quarterfinals ===
December 6, 2013	Connecticut	1–2	#8 Virginia	Charlottesville, Virginia
19:00 EST	Morad 39'	Report	Zinkhan 12'; Allen 63'	Stadium: Klöckner Stadium; Attendance: 921; Referee: Chris Penso

December 7, 2013	#5 Maryland	2–1	#4 California	Berkeley, California
16:30 EST	Shinsky 33'; Sauers 86'	Report	Bonomo 50'	Stadium: Edwards Stadium; Attendance: 2,330; Referee: Ian Anderson

December 7, 2013	#11 Michigan State	1–2	#3 Notre Dame	Notre Dame, Indiana
19:00 EST	Chapman 59'	Report	Panken 31'; Hodan 48'	Stadium: Alumni Field; Attendance: 1,003; Referee: Shane Butler

December 7, 2013	#7 New Mexico	1–0	#2 Washington	Seattle, Washington
20:00 EST	McKendry 37'	Report		Stadium: Husky Soccer Stadium; Attendance: 2,240; Referee: Alex Gorin

=== College Cup ===
==== Semifinals ====
December 13, 2013	#7 New Mexico	0–2	#3 Notre Dame	Chester, Pennsylvania
17:00 EST		Report	Hodan 7', 65'	Stadium: PPL Park; Attendance: 4,172; Referee: Mark Kadlecik

December 13, 2013	#8 Virginia	1–2	#5 Maryland	Chester, Pennsylvania
19:30 EST	Wharton 77' (pen.)	Report	Mullins 11', 76'	Stadium: PPL Park; Attendance: 4,172; Referee: Ted Unkel

==== Championship ====
December 15, 2013
15:00 EST

#5 Maryland	1–2	#3 Notre Dame
Mullins 35'	Report	Brown 40'; O'Malley 60'

PPL Park, Chester, Pennsylvania
Attendance: 5,303
Referee: Hilario Grajeda

Team details

Maryland
Notre Dame

== Statistics ==
=== Goalscorers ===
5 goals

- (United States) Patrick Mullins – Maryland
- (United States) Patrick Hodan – Notre Dame

3 goals

- (Poland) Wojciech Wojcik – Bradley
- (United States) Alec Sundly – California
- (Canada) Cyle Larin – Connecticut
- (United States) Harry Shipp – Notre Dame

2 goals

- (Costa Rica) Reinaldo Brenes – Akron
- (Senegal) Mamadou Diouf – Connecticut
- (United States) Michael Sauers – Maryland
- (United States) Geoff Fries – Navy
- (United States) Evan Panken – Notre Dame
- (United States) Tim Hopkinson – Old Dominion
- (Mexico) Miguel Gonzalez – Seattle
- (United States) Victor Chavez – UCLA
- (Germany) Leo Stolz – UCLA
- (United States) Todd Wharton – Virginia
- (United States) Ryan Zinkhan – Virginia

1 goal

- (United States) Aodhan Quinn – Akron
- (United States) Scott Davis – Bradley
- (United States) Steve Birnbaum – California
- (United States) Stefano Bonomo – California
- (Brazil) Thales Moreno – Clemson
- (Canada) Sergio Camargo – Coastal Carolina
- (United States) Ricky Garbanzo – Coastal Carolina
- (Czech Republic) Jakub Štourač – Coastal Carolina
- (Canada) Kwame Awuah – Connecticut
- (United States) Kareem Morad – Connecticut
- (United States) Nicholas Zuniga – Connecticut
- (England) Sonny Makh – Creighton
- (Spain) Guillermo Delgado – Delaware
- (United States) Jared Girard – Drexel
- (United States) Jason Waterman – Elon
- (United States) Bakie Goodman – Georgetown
- (United States) Alex Muyl – Georgetown
- (United States) Cole Seiler – Georgetown
- (United States) Timi Mulgrew – George Mason
- (United States) Wes Sever – George Mason
- (United States) Jacob Bushue – Indiana
- (United States) Dylan Lax – Indiana
- (United States) Adrien Perez – Loyola Marymount
- (United States) Coco Navarro – Marquette
- (Ghana) James Nortey – Marquette
- (United States) Jake Pace – Maryland
- (United States) Alex Shinsky – Maryland
- (Canada) Jay Chapman – Michigan State
- (United States) Tim Kreutz – Michigan State
- (United States) Adam Montague – Michigan State
- (United States) Jamie Dubyoski – Navy
- (United States) Martin Sanchez – Navy
- (Jamaica) Oniel Fisher – New Mexico
- (United States) Riley McGovern – New Mexico
- (Canada) Ben McKendry – New Mexico
- (United States) James Rogers – New Mexico
- (Jamaica) Omar Holness – North Carolina
- (New Zealand) Nikko Boxall – Northwestern
- (United States) Grant Wilson – Northwestern
- (United States) Leon Brown – Notre Dame
- (United States) Vince Cicciarelli – Notre Dame
- (United States) Andrew O'Malley – Notre Dame
- (United States) Jesse Miralrio – Old Dominion
- (United States) Sidney Rivera – Old Dominion
- (United States) Cole Stringer – Old Dominion
- (United States) Alec Neumann – Penn
- (United States) Eli Dennis – Penn State
- (United States) Connor Maloney – Penn State
- (Australia) Simon Hinde – Quinnipiac
- (United States) Wilder Arboleda – Providence
- (England) Phil Towler – Providence
- (United States) Chase Hanson – Seattle
- (United States) Michael Roberts – Seattle
- (Brazil) Gabriel Camara – St. John's
- (United States) Jordan Rouse – St. John's
- (United States) Zach Batteer – Stanford
- (United States) Matt Taylor – Stanford
- (United States) Christopher Santana – UC Irvine
- (United States) Aaron Simmons – UCLA
- (United States) Joe Sofia – UCLA
- (Germany) Felix Vobejda – UCLA
- (United States) Geaton Caltabiano – UMBC
- (United States) Pete Caringi – UMBC
- (United States) Jordan Allen – Virginia
- (United States) Eric Bird – Virginia
- (United States) Darius Madison – Virginia
- (United States) Scott Thomsen – Virginia
- (United States) Michael Gamble – Wake Forest
- (United States) Ricky Greensfelder – Wake Forest
- (United States) Tolani Ibikunle – Wake Forest
- (United States) Sean Okoli – Wake Forest
- (Canada) Josh Heard – Washington
- (United States) Darwin Jones – Washington
- (United States) Ian Lange – Washington
- (United States) Mason Robertson – Washington
- (United States) Cristian Roldan – Washington
- (United States) Jackson Eskay – William & Mary
- (United States) Roshan Patel – William & Mary
- (United States) Chris Prince – Wisconsin

Own goals

- (United States) Tolani Ibikunle – Wake Forest (playing against Notre Dame)
