= Notre Dame Fighting Irish men's soccer =

American college soccer team

- 2026 Notre Dame Fighting Irish men's soccer team
- University: University of Notre Dame
- Athletic director: Pete Bevacqua
- Head coach: Chad Riley (9th season)
- Conference: ACC
- Location: Notre Dame, Indiana, US
- Stadium: Alumni Stadium (capacity: 2,500)
- Nickname: Fighting Irish
- Colors: Blue and gold
Home	Away

NCAA tournament championships
- 2013

NCAA tournament runner-up
- 2023

NCAA tournament College Cup
- 2013, 2021, 2023

NCAA tournament Quarterfinals
- 2006, 2007, 2013, 2018, 2021, 2023

NCAA tournament Round of 16
- 1996, 2003, 2005, 2006, 2007, 2012, 2013, 2014, 2015, 2016, 2018, 2021, 2023

NCAA tournament appearances
- 1988, 1993, 1994, 1996, 2001, 2002, 2003, 2004, 2005, 2006, 2007, 2008, 2009, 2010, 2012, 2013, 2014, 2015, 2016, 2017, 2018, 2019, 2021, 2023, 2025

Conference tournament championships
- 1993, 1994, 1996, 2003, 2012, 2021

Conference regular season championships
- 1989, 1993, 2004, 2007, 2008, 2013, 2014, 2023

The Notre Dame Fighting Irish men's soccer team represents the University of Notre Dame in National Collegiate Athletic Association Division I men's soccer. The team competes in the Atlantic Coast Conference and is currently coached by Chad Riley. The team has made twenty four appearances in the NCAA Division I men's soccer tournament with the most recent coming in 2023. The Fighting Irish won the 2013 national championship.

== Origins ==
The Irish soccer team was started as a club sport in 1961 by Joe Echelle and Faculty Advisor Mr. Christopher Fagan. The club was made up of students representing five continents and was a manifestation of the increasing popularity of soccer as a college sport. The team posted a respectable inaugural 3–2 record winning games against Indiana Tech, Goshen College and Purdue

== Players ==
=== Current roster ===
As of September 6, 2026

Note: Flags indicate national team as defined under FIFA eligibility rules; some limited exceptions apply. Players may hold more than one non-FIFA nationality.

No.	Pos.	Nation	Player
0	GK	USA	Cole Kowalski
1	GK	USA	Blake Kelly
2	DF	USA	Eli Ackerman
3	DF	USA	Sean McDowd
4	DF	USA	Jack Ross
5	DF	USA	Will Schroeder
6	MF	USA	Ian Shaul
7	FW	USA	Nate Zimmermann
8	MF	USA	Nico Bartlett
9	FW	USA	Ren Sylvester
10	MF	USA	Nolan Spicer
11	FW	USA	Jack Flanagan
12	MF	USA	Ethan Scala
13	FW	USA	Tristan Tropeano

No.	Pos.	Nation	Player
14	DF	USA	Maverick McCoy
15	FW	USA	Michael Capretto
16	MF	USA	Leo Brummell
18	DF	USA	Thaddeus Sawyer
19	MF	USA	Vlad Walent
20	MF	USA	Brady Hilden
21	MF	USA	Karson Baquero
22	DF	USA	Lincoln Ulrich
23	FW	USA	Stevie Dunphy
24	MF	USA	Evan Lim
25	FW	USA	Patrick Cuneo
26	MF	USA	Diego Green
27	FW	USA	Luke Burton
30	GK	USA	Noah Deitrich

=== Statistical leaders ===
Year-by-Year Statistical Leaders
Year	Goals Leader	G	Assists Leader	A
1977	Jim Mollering	14	Bill Hagerty	13
1978	Kevin Lovejoy	29	Ted Carnevale	10
1979	Kevin Lovejoy	22	Mike Mai	15
1980	Kevin Lovejoy	16	Sami Kahale	8
1981	Sami Kahale	12	Sami Kahale	15
1981	Ed O'Malley	12	Sami Kahale	15
1981	Rob Snyder	12	Sami Kahale	15
1982	Mario Manta	16	Richard Herdegen	9
1982	Mario Manta	16	Steve Chang	9
1983	Richard Herdegen	16	Tom Daley	11
1983	Pat Szanto	16	Tom Daley	11
1984	Richard Herdegen	16	Pat Szanto	6
1985	Joe Sternberg	10	Tommy Gerlacher	8
1986	Bruce McCourt	13	Randy Morris	10
1987	Bruce McCourt	13	Randy Morris	17
1987	Joe Sternberg	13	Randy Morris	17
1988	Randy Morris	14	Randy Morris	12
1989	Kevin Pendergast	12	Steve LaVigne	7
1990	Kevin Pendergast	7	Kevin Pendergast	4
1990	Kenyon Meyer	7	Kevin Pendergast	4
1991	Jean Joseph	11	Jean Joseph	6
1992	Bill Lanza	8	Bill Lanza	4
1992	Bill Lanza	8	Brendan Dillman	4
1993	Bill Lanza	15	Bill Lanza	10
1994	Tim Oates	12	Tim Oates	11
1995	Ben Bocklage	9	Bill Lanza	11
1996	Tony Capasso	7	Tony Capasso	6
1997	Ryan Turner	12	Scott Wells	8
1998	Shane Walton	10	Ryan Cox	8
1999	Erich Braun	9	Erich Braun	6
2000	Erich Braun	4	Chad Riley	6
2000	Justin Detter	4	Chad Riley	6
2000	Griffin Howard	4	Chad Riley	6
2001	Erich Braun	12	Devon Prescod	6
2001	Erich Braun	12	Chad Riley	6
2002	Erich Braun	11	Chad Riley	12
2003	Justin Detter	14	Kevin Goldthwaite	9
2004	Justin McGeeney	5	Ian Etherington	5
2004	Tony Megna	5	Ian Etherington	5
2005	Joseph Lapira	7	Joseph Lapira	5
2005	Joseph Lapira	7	Ryan Miller	5
2006	Joseph Lapira	22	Nate Norman	7
2007	Joseph Lapira	9	Joseph Lapira	10
2008	Bright Dike	12	Jeb Brovsky	6
2009	Bright Dike	11	Michael Thomas	6
2010	Steven Perry	12	Brendan King	6
2010	Steven Perry	12	Harrison Shipp	6
2011	Ryan Finley	7	Adam Mena	5
2012	Ryan Finley	21	Dillon Powers	9
2013	Harrison Shipp	12	Harrison Shipp	10
2014	Patrick Hodan	9	Jeffrey Farina	7
2015	Jon Gallagher	9	Evan Panken	9
2016	Jon Gallagher	14	Jon Gallagher	7
2017	Jon Gallagher	13	Félicien Dumas	8
2018	Thomas Ueland	6	Félicien Dumas	6
2018	Patrick Berneski	6	Félicien Dumas	6
2019	Jack Lynn	9	Félicien Dumas	6
2020	Jack Lynn	8	Aiden McFadden	4
2021	Jack Lynn	10	Dawson McCartney	5
2021	Jack Lynn	10	Paddy Burns	5
2021	Jack Lynn	10	Ethan O'Brien	5
2022	Daniel Russo	6	Daniel Russo	4
2022	Daniel Russo	6	Matthew Roou	4
2023	Eno Nto	11	KK Baffour	7
2023	Eno Nto	11	Bryce Boneau	7
2024	Matthew Roou	14	Bryce Boneau	8
2025	Wyatt Borso	5	Nolan Spicer	7
2025	Mitch Ferguson	5	Nolan Spicer	7

=== Current professionals ===
- Updated March 4, 2025
- (United States) Chad Riley (2000–2003) – Currently Head Coach with Notre Dame
- (England) John Mousinho (2003–2005) – Currently Head Coach with Portsmouth F.C.
- (United States) Greg Dalby (2003–2006) – Currently Head Coach with Air Force
- (United States) Dillon Powers (2009–2012) – Currently with Orange County SC
- (United States) Brandon Aubrey (2013–2016) – Currently with the Dallas Cowboys (switched codes)
- (Republic of Ireland) Jon Gallagher (2014–2017) – Currently with Austin FC
- (United States) Tommy McCabe (2016–2018) – Currently with Loudoun United FC
- (United States) Paul Rothrock (2017–2018) – Currently with Seattle Sounders FC
- (United States) Aiden McFadden (2017–2020) – Currently with Louisville City FC
- (Canada) Mohamed Omar (2018–2021) – Currently with San Antonio FC
- (United States) Philip Quinton (2018–2021) – Currently with Real Salt Lake
- Mohammad Abualnadi (2019–2021) – Currently with Selangor F.C. and Jordan international
- (Republic of Ireland) Ethan O'Brien (2019–2023) – Currently with Drogheda United F.C.
- (United States) Dawson McCartney (2020–2021) – Currently with Birmingham Legion FC
- (United States) Bryan Dowd (2020–2023) – Currently with Chicago Fire FC
- (United States) Bryce Boneau (2021–2023) – Currently with Huntsville City FC
- (United States) Josh Ramsey (2021–2024) – Currently with Lexington SC

== Titles ==
Key

- (1) – Title number
- a.e.t. – Match went to extra time
- p – Match decided by a penalty shootout after extra time
- N – North division
- C – Coastal division

=== National ===
Championship	#	Season	Score	Rival	Venue
NCAA tournament	1	2013	2–1	Maryland	Subaru Park

=== Conference ===
Conference	Championship	Titles	Winning years
Horizon League	Tournament	3	1988, 1993, 1994
Horizon League	Regular season	2	1989 (N), 1993
Big East	Tournament	3	1996, 2003, 2012
Big East	Regular season	2	2004, 2008
Atlantic Coast	Tournament	1	2021
Atlantic Coast	Regular season	3	2013 (Note: Co-champions, along with Maryland.), 2014 (C), 2023 (C)
Independent	Regular season	3	2004, 2007, 2008
