= Bobby Robinson (athletic director) =

American college athletics administrator

Biographical details
- Born: Columbia, South Carolina, U.S.
- Education: Furman (BA 1968)

Coaching career (HC unless noted)

Men's Golf
- 1974–1983: Clemson

Administrative career (AD unless noted)
- 1977–1985: Clemson (Asst. AD, Assoc. AD)
- 1985–2002: Clemson
- 2003–?: Georgia Tech (Sr. Assoc. AD)

Bobby Robinson is an American retired college athletics administrator.

== Early life and education ==
Robinson was born in Columbia, South Carolina, and graduated from Furman University in 1968 with a degree in business and political science.

== Career ==
Bobby worked in the housing office at Clemson University from 1970 until 1973, when he moved to the athletic department. Robinson was men's golf coach from 1974 through 1983, winning one Atlantic Coast Conference title and reaching three NCAA Tournaments. He was named business manager in 1975, assistant athletic director in 1977, and associate athletic director in 1980.

Robinson was promoted to athletic director in 1985, after Bill McLellan was forced out amid drug and recruiting scandals. The scandals eventually led to the ouster of popular football coach Danny Ford, prompting threats against Robinson. During his tenure, 16 of Clemson's 19 sports had at least one top-10 national finish. Robinson also began an $82 million fundraising campaign to improve facilities, and he created the nation's first student-athlete enrichment center, and athletes' grade point averages increased from 2.33 to 2.80. Robinson retired from Clemson in 2002, and was replaced by Terry Don Phillips.

In 2003, Robinson joined Georgia Tech's athletic department as Senior Associate Director of Athletics.
