= History of Clemson Tigers football =

History of the Clemson Tigers college football program

The history of Clemson Tigers football began in 1896, when Clemson University first fielded a football team. Since 1896, the program has an all-time record of 790–466–44, with a bowl record of 28–22. The program has achieved 3 claimed national titles in 1981, 2016, and 2018.

Walter Riggs, often regarded as the "father of Clemson football," brought the sport to Clemson from the Agricultural and Mechanical College of Alabama (now Auburn University). The team's first game, played on Halloween 1896, resulted in a 2–1 record for the inaugural season. Riggs influenced the choice of the team mascot and colors. The Tigers’ early success included their first undefeated season in 1900 under coach John W. Heisman, who led the team to a 19–3–2 record. Heisman’s coaching set a precedent for excellence and innovation.

During the mid-20th century, the program experienced substantial growth under Frank Howard, who coached from 1940 to 1969. Howard's tenure saw Clemson win two Southern Conference championships and six ACC championships. Known for his colorful personality and imaginative storytelling, Howard integrated various offensive formations. His legacy includes the tradition of rubbing "Howard's Rock" before home games and the naming of the playing field at Memorial Stadium as "Frank Howard Field" in 1974.

The late 20th century and early 21st century saw the football program navigate through challenges and successes under multiple head coaches. Danny Ford led the Tigers to their first national championship in 1981, achieving an undefeated season. Ford's era was marked by NCAA sanctions due to recruiting violations, which impacted the program's reputation and success. Ken Hatfield, Ford’s successor, focused on cleaning up the program's image but faced criticism from fans, leading to his resignation. Subsequent coaches, including Tommy West, struggled to achieve consistent success until the hiring of Tommy Bowden in 1999, who maintained bowl eligibility every season, but failed to secure an ACC championship.

The modern era is defined by the leadership of Dabo Swinney, who became head coach in 2008. Swinney revitalized the program, leading the Tigers to multiple ACC championships and two national titles in 2016 and 2018. His tenure has been characterized by significant achievements, including the establishment of Clemson as a perennial contender in the College Football Playoff. Swinney’s ability to recruit and develop talent, combined with strategic hires like offensive coordinator Chad Morris and defensive coordinator Brent Venables, has sustained Clemson’s success. Notably, under Swinney, Clemson became the first team since 1897 to finish a season 15–0.

== History ==
=== Early history (1896–1939) ===
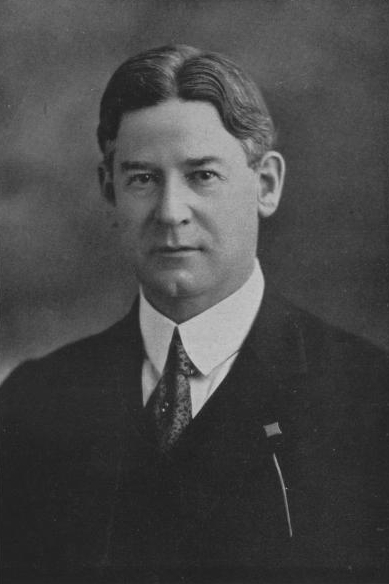
Walter Riggs, the "father of Clemson football"

Walter Riggs can be characterized as the "Father of Clemson Football", as he brought the game with him from Agricultural and Mechanical College of Alabama (now Auburn University). The fact that Auburn and Clemson share the same mascot is no accident. Riggs allowed his players to pick the team mascot and, although he may have influenced their decision, the players chose Tigers because Princeton University had just won the national championship. Riggs helped organize and coach the infant Tiger team in 1896. With little money to spend on uniforms, Riggs brought some of Auburn's old practice uniforms with him, which happened to have orange and navy jerseys. Because the jerseys had gone through a few washboard scrubbings, they were quite faded, the navy worse than the orange. So Riggs made the school's predominant color orange and the faded condition of the navy became the purplish color, officially known today as Regalia. The team played as a member of the Southern Intercollegiate Athletic Association (SIAA), the first southern athletics conference.

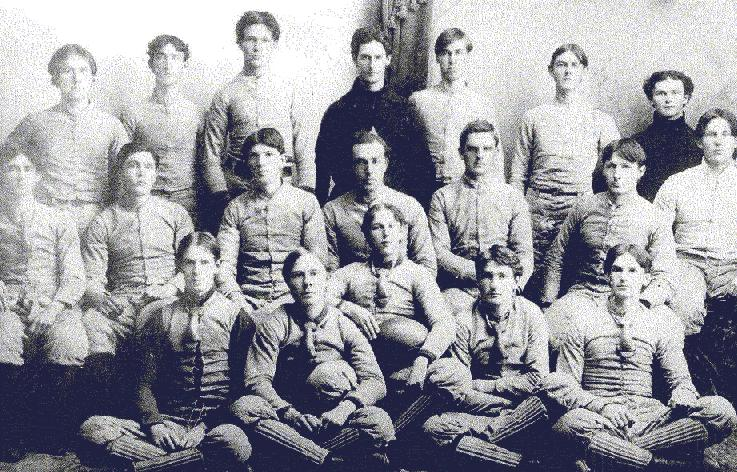
The 1896 Clemson Tigers team

When the Tigers traveled to Greenville on Halloween to play Furman in their very first match, only Coach Riggs and backfield player Frank Thompkins had ever seen a football game played. Today in Clemson, the soccer field is named Historic Riggs field after Walter Riggs. Riggs took the team to a 2–1 record in the inaugural year. He then stepped aside at the urging of the military cadets/students, who felt that he should concentrate on his scholastic duties rather than coach the team for free. William M. Williams coached the Tigers in 1897, guiding them to a 2–2 record. The team beat South Carolina for the first time and was state champion. In 1898, John Penton led the Tigers to a 3–1 record. In 1899, when the Clemson Athletic Association could not afford a coaching salary, Riggs again took over the reins, one of only two Clemson football coaches to return to the position after stepping down. The 1899 squad went 4–2. Riggs' overall record of 6–3 gives him a .667 winning percentage. After decade as a Mechanical Engineering professor, he was named acting president of Clemson Agricultural College in 1910, being confirmed by the Board of Trustees as permanent president on March 7, 1911. He served until his untimely death on January 22, 1924, while on a trip to Washington, D.C. to meet with officials of other land grant institutions.

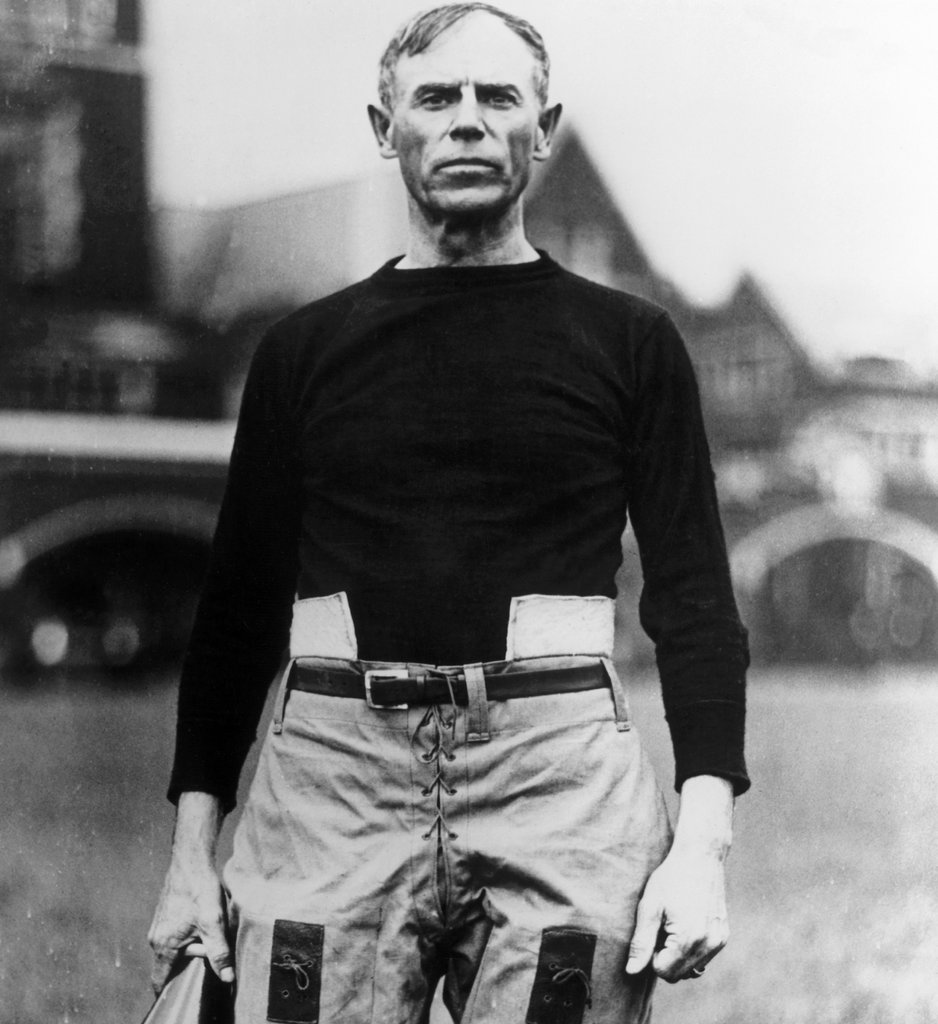
John Heisman on Bowman Field, Clemson's first gridiron.

Riggs hired John Heisman to coach Clemson. Heisman stayed only four years at Clemson, where he compiled a record of 19–3–2, an .833 percentage, the best in Clemson football history. In four seasons, he had two SIAA titles. In his first season of 1900, he coached the Tigers to their first undefeated season (6–0),^{[3]} and first conference championship, outscoring their opponents 222–10 – the 64–0 win over Davidson on opening day was then the largest score ever made in the South. The season had various other "firsts", including the school's first defeat of the Georgia Bulldogs and the Alabama Crimson Tide. The only close game was with the South Atlantic school VPI. The 1902 team again won the SIAA. This was the first season with both Hope Sadler and Carl Sitton at ends. One writer recalls, "Sitton and Hope Sadler were the finest ends that Clemson ever had perhaps." The only loss on the year was the first to rival South Carolina since 1896.

The 1903 team may have been Heisman's best at Clemson. Following a 73–0 defeat of Georgia Tech in 1903, the Yellow Jackets hired Heisman as their first full-time football coach. Fullback Jock Hanvey rushed for 104 yards in the first half. The account in the Atlanta Constitution read "Hanvey, the Clemson full back, outclassed them all. Time and time again he was sent through the line for gains of 10, 15 and 20 yards, and his tackles were spectacular." After the 1903 season, Clemson tied 11–11 in a game billed as the "SIAA Championship Game."

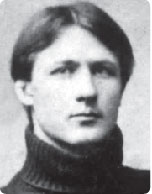
Shack Shealy, the only Clemson alum to coach the Tigers

After Heisman left Clemson to become the head coach at Georgia Tech, Shack Shealy, an end for the Tigers in the 1890s, coached the 1904 team to a 3–3–1 record – the only Clemson graduate ever to serve as head coach of his alma mater. Eddie Cochems, a future innovator of the former pass, had just lost out to Phil King for the Wisconsin job, when he accepted to coach Clemson's 1905 team. The team lost to Vanderbilt and Georgia Tech, but shut out Georgia, Alabama, and Auburn while featuring stars left over from Heisman like Fritz Furtick and Puss Derrick. Bob Williams, who beat Heisman in 1902, came to Clemson in 1906, and also coached the 1909 and 1913 to 1915 teams. The Tigers went undefeated with a 4–0–3 record in 1906, with wins over Georgia, Auburn, Tennessee, and the John Heisman-coached Georgia Tech team. Clemson's first forward pass took place during the game with Tech in Atlanta. Left End Powell Lykes, dropped back to kick, but lobbed a 30-yard pass to George Warren instead. Clemson won, 10–0. The 1909 USC-Clemson was the first game broadcast in the state, by the United Wireless Telegraph Company. William Schilletter starred in 1913 and 1914, and was the son of Augustus "Shorty" Schilletter, a German immigrant in charge of the Clemson College dining hall. Frank Shaughnessy led the 1907 team to a. 4–4 record. Captain Mac McLaurin and R. T. Gaston starred at either tackle position. Vanderbilt legend Stein Stone posted just a 1–6 record in 1908. Captain Sticker Coles was All-Southern. Frank Dobson posted 11–12–1 overall record from 1910 to 1912. Wayne Hart had a 3–6 record in 1916. Washington & Lee's Edward Donahue coached the Tigers to 21–12–3 record over three seasons, from 1917 to 1920. Stumpy Banks scored five touchdowns against Furman in 1917 for a school record. Yen Lightsey starred in 1919 and 1920. Doc Stewart coached the Tigers through the transition from the SIAA to the Southern Conference, with a 6–10–2 record from 1921 to 1922. Bud Saunders led the Tigers to a 10–22–1 record from 1923 to 1926.

Josh Cody coached the Tigers from 1927 to 1930, posting a 29–11–1 record. The Tigers were undefeated at home (13–0–1) and against South Carolina (3–0) during Cody's tenure. In 1927 Cody gave Red Sanders his first coaching job as backfield coach. O. K. Pressley made third-team All-American in 1928. "A better center than Captain O.K. Pressley of Clemson is hard to find," remarked former South Carolina head coach Billy Laval. In May 1929, when rumors were swirling that he might leave to coach a bigger-name program, the students, faculty, and staff took up a collection to buy him a brand new black Buick automobile. Raymond Johnson wrote upon Cody's death: "Josh Cody wanted to be Vanderbilt's coach so bad that he gave up the head man's job at Clemson College after four successful seasons." In 1931, Jess Neely (another McGugin product, and a former head coach at Rhodes College and assistant at Alabama) became Clemson's head football coach. During his tenure, Neely led the Tigers to a 43–35–7 record. His final season at Clemson was the turning point in the Tigers' program. His team went 9–1 during that season, finishing second to Duke in the Southern Conference. The Tigers also received their first bowl invitation and bowl victory that year, defeating nationally ranked Boston College 6–3 in the 1940 Cotton Bowl Classic. The 1939 Tigers finished with a No. 12 ranking in the final AP poll. Clemson also had their first Associated Press All-American that year in Banks McFadden. Jess Neely, along with then athletic director Rupert Fike, founded the IPTAY Scholarship Fund, which supports the Clemson Athletic Department. An acronym for "I Pay Ten A Year," as that was what it asked boosters to donate when founded in 1934, IPTAY has since grown into one of the largest and most comprehensive collegiate sporting funds in the nation and a model for other programs.

=== Frank Howard era (1940–1969) ===
After Jess Neely left to become the head coach at Rice, his line coach, Frank Howard was named his successor. Known for his colorful persona, and penchant for imaginative language with both probable, and improbable stories, in his 30 years at Clemson, Howard compiled a 165–118–12 record, a 3–3 bowl record, won two Southern Conference championships, and six ACC championships. Seven of Howard's teams finished the year ranked in at least one final poll. During his stay at Clemson, Howard also oversaw the athletic department, ticket sales, and was an assistant coach for the baseball team. He also incorporated the Single Wing, T-formation, and I-formation offenses at different points during his coaching career at Clemson.

In the sterling 1948 season, the team won a Southern Conference championship (Howard's first of eight). The Tigers also won their second bowl game, a 1948 Gator Bowl win over Missouri, finished 11th in the national rankings, and Howard was named Southern Conference Coach of the Year. For the rest of his life, Howard credited the 1948 team with saving his job. Howard nearly repeated the 1948 success in 1950 when the Tigers were ranked tenth by the Associated Press with a 9–0–1 season and a 15–14 win over Miami (Florida) in Clemson's first Orange Bowl win. In January 1952, after a 7–2 regular season campaign, the Tigers were invited back to the Gator Bowl, and by being conference champions once again in 1956, Clemson played in the 1957 Orange Bowl. In their second Gator Bowl trip, Miami downed Clemson 14–0. Colorado led Clemson 20–0, then trailed 21–20, in a comeback game, before finally defeating the Tigers 27–21 in the 1957 Orange Bowl. Two season's later, after an 8–3 season, the Tigers played in the 1959 Sugar Bowl and with their tough defense, held the No. 1-ranked LSU Tigers to a standstill before losing 7–0, leading to an LSU national championship. The invitation to play in the inaugural Bluebonnet Bowl in December 1959 was the eighth bowl that Howard had been a part of either as a player, assistant coach or head coach. It was the seventh bowl trip for a Clemson team and the sixth in 12 years. Howard said that Clemson's 23–7 triumph over seventh-ranked Texas Christian was the best performance he had ever witnessed by a Clemson team. In 1959 he was named Atlantic Coast Conference Coach of the Year and was accorded the honor again in 1966.

As the style of football evolved in the 1960s, Howard's ground game became outdated, and Clemson's gridiron fortunes declined. The Tigers last winning season under Howard came in 1967. On December 10, 1969, he stepped down as the fifth winningest coach in the nation. Howard also managed the athletic department during his tenure, and continued on as athletic director until February 4, 1971, when he was named assistant to the vice president of the university. On June 30, 1974, he retired from the university payroll, but continued to come into his office daily until failing health slowed him down, serving as Clemson's ambassador until his death in 1996. The tradition of rubbing "Howard's Rock" prior to running down the hill before home games began during Coach Howard's tenure. The playing field at Memorial Stadium was named "Frank Howard Field" in 1974 following his retirement to honor his many years of service for the university.

=== Hootie Ingram era (1970–1972) ===
Clemson struggled during the years following Frank Howard's retirement. His successor, Hootie Ingram, only compiled a 12–21 record. During his tenure, the tradition of running down the hill was stopped from 1970 to the end of the 1972 season, when the team decided it wanted to come down the hill for the final home game against South Carolina. The traditional "tiger paw" logo, which was designed by John Antonio of Henderson Advertising, was introduced in 1970 by Ingram and Clemson President R.C. Edwards.

=== Red Parker era (1973–1976) ===
After a successful run as head coach of The Citadel from 1966 to 1972, Jimmy "Red" Parker coached the Tigers from 1973 to 1976, compiling a 17–25–2 record. Clemson had a 7–4 season under Parker in 1974, with Parker being named ACC Coach of the Year. The Tigers went 2–9 in 1975, and 3–6–2 in 1976. Red Parker was cut loose by the board of trustees at the end of the Bicentennial season. Athletic Director Bill McClellan got the task of informing Parker he was gone when Parker refused to fire his assistants. Though Parker is largely credited with building and recruiting a foundation that would ultimately set the stage for much of Clemson's success in the following seasons.

=== Charley Pell era (1977–1978) ===
Using some of the talent enrolled during the Parker seasons, Charley Pell coached the Tigers for two seasons, winning the ACC Coach of the Year award twice and leading the Tigers to the 1978 ACC Championship en route to an 18–4–1 record.

Dual-threat quarterback Steve Fuller and the running back tandem of Lester Brown and Marvin Sims spearheaded a dynamic rushing attack that helped the Tigers win the ACC. The only loss came in Week 2 against SEC power Georgia, and, after a Gator Bowl win over No. 20 Ohio State, Clemson posted its second-best final AP poll finish in school history with a No. 6 ranking. In both seasons, Clemson earned berths to the Gator Bowl, although Pell left before the latter game. Pell became involved in NCAA rules and recruiting violations that came to light under the tenure of his successor, Danny Ford. Charlie Pell would leave after 1978 to become head coach at Florida, where his coaching career would end in 1984 following more NCAA rules violations.

=== Danny Ford era (1978–1989) ===
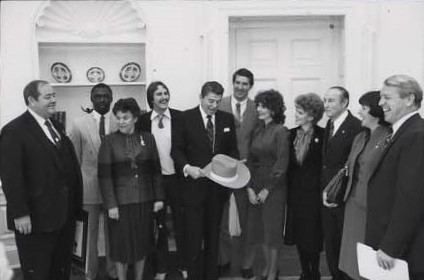
1981 Clemson Tigers football team visit the Oval Office in January 1982

Danny Ford was promoted from offensive line coach to head coach in 1978, after Charlie Pell left for the University of Florida. He won his first game, the 1978 Gator Bowl, with a 17–15 victory over Ohio State and legendary coach Woody Hayes, who punched MG Charlie Bauman in the throat after making the game-clinching interception. In his third season, Ford guided Clemson to the summit of college football by winning the National Championship, and recording the program's fifth undefeated season. The Tigers, who were unranked in the preseason, downed three top-10 teams (Georgia, North Carolina and Nebraska) during the course of the 12–0 season that concluded with a 22–15 victory over Nebraska in the 1982 Orange Bowl. Ford, named National Coach-of-the-Year in 1981, holds the record as the youngest coach (33 years old) to win a national championship on the gridiron.

Ranked No. 10 before the 1982 season began, Clemson finish with the regular season with a record of 9–1–1. After the No. 8 Tigers received a bid to the Cotton Bowl with only one loss on the season, the senior class voted to decline the invitation. On November 22, 1982, the football program at Clemson was placed on probation for a 2-year period to include the 1983 and 1984 seasons. This NCAA sanction was due to a lengthy history of recruiting violations to gain an athletic advantage that had taken place from 1977 and into 1982, under the administration of two head coaches. More than 150 documented violations and 69 charges were cited under NCAA bylaws in the categories of improper recruiting inducements, extra benefits to student-athletes, ethical conduct, improper financial aid, improper campus visits, improper transportation and entertainment, improper use of funds, improper employment, and improper recruiting contact. Clemson was censured by the NCAA including barred from participating in bowl games following the 1982 and 1983 seasons, barred from appearing on live television in the 1983 and 1984 seasons, while scholarships were restricted to 20 (from the normal limit of 30) for the 1983–84 and 1984–85 academic years. Charles Alan Wright, chairman of the NCAA Committee on Infractions said at the time, "Due to the large number and serious nature of the violations in this case, the committee believed that institutional sanctions related to appearances on television and in postseason football bowl games were appropriate. In addition, because the violations indicated a pattern of improper recruiting activities, the committee determined that a two-year limitation on financial aid to new recruits should be imposed to offset any recruiting advantage that was gained improperly by the university." The reduction of scholarships could be felt in the next two seasons, as Clemson posted a 7–4 season in 1984 and an even 6–6 campaign in 1985.

From 1987 to 1990, Clemson posted four consecutive 10 win seasons and won three straight ACC titles, including a 35–10 victory over Penn State and a 13–6 defeat of Oklahoma in the 1989 Florida Citrus Bowl. At that time, no team in Clemson history started higher in the AP poll than the 1988 team beginning the year as the No. 4-ranked team in the nation and a preseason favorite to win the national title. Five years after their first probation under Ford ended, Clemson once again found their football program accused of multiple recruiting violations in January 1990. The NCAA accused Clemson coaches of committing 14 rules violations, including giving cash to players and having illegal contact with recruits over a period from 1984 to 1988. Shortly after, Ford submitted a forced resignation. The NCAA later cleared Clemson of all allegations. Ford coached 21 All-Americans and 41 players who went on to play in the NFL, during his 11 seasons at Clemson. After a few years away from coaching, Ford was hired by Arkansas in 1992, where he would spend five seasons guiding the Razorbacks. In 2017, Ford was named to the College Football Hall of Fame.

=== Ken Hatfield era (1990–1993) ===
Ken Hatfield, former coach at Air Force and Arkansas, took over as head coach at Clemson in January 1990. He had a 32–13–1 record with the Tigers and led them to three bowl games. Hatfield worked to clean up the program's image in the wake of the Ford-era sanctions. However, in the wake of Ford's success, Hatfield and many in the Clemson fanbase did not see eye-to-eye. A common saying among Tiger fans during this time was "Howard built it. Ford filled it. Hatfield killed it." This sentiment followed Clemson's first losing season (1992) since 1976. Largely due to this discontent, school officials refused to grant him a one-year extension on his contract after the 1993 season, even though the Tigers had rebounded from 5–6 in 1992 to an 8–3 record that year and were invited to the Peach Bowl. Expressing "much disappointment" in what he saw as a lack of support by Clemson fans and several university officials, Hatfield resigned at the end of the regular season. He was later hired at Rice. The purple home jerseys used by Clemson in special games made their debut during the 1991 ACC championship season, with the Tigers wearing them in the regular season against NC State and in the Citrus Bowl vs. California.

=== Tommy West era (1993–1998) ===
Tommy West replaced Ken Hatfield at the end of the 1993 season, coaching the Tigers to a 14–13 victory in the 1993 Peach Bowl against Kentucky. West had a 31–28 record during his five seasons at Clemson and led the Tigers to three bowl games but no ACC championships. West was fired after a dismal 1998 campaign which saw Clemson go 3–8 and finish last in the ACC. West went on to be the head coach at Memphis.

=== Tommy Bowden era (1999–2008) ===
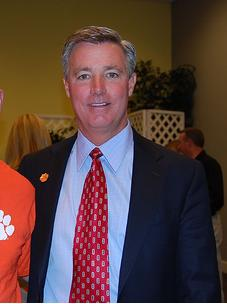
Coach Bowden

After Tommy West's dismissal following the 1998 season, Clemson hired Tommy Bowden, son of Bobby Bowden and coach at Tulane. Bowden led the Tigers to a 6–6 record and a Peach Bowl bid in 1999, with the team that navigated its way through a schedule that included MAC champions and undefeated Marshall, Big East champion and BCS runner-up Virginia Tech (who went undefeated during the regular season), and eventual National Champion Florida State (who finished the year undefeated). The 1999 meeting between the Tigers and Seminoles was dubbed the "Bowden Bowl" and was the first time that a father and son coached against each other in Division I football. FSU won the game 17– 14 in front of the largest crowd in the history of Death Valley.

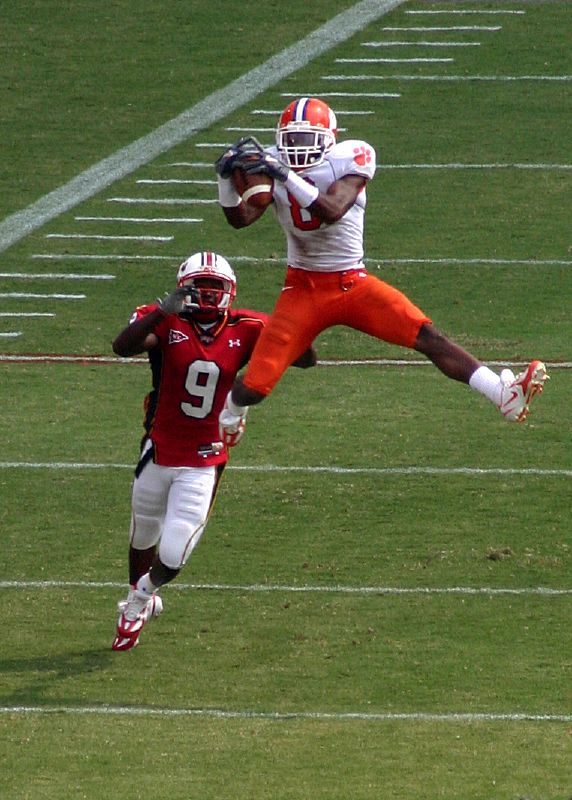
Tye Hill interception

During Bowden's tenure, the Tigers were bowl eligible every season but didn't win any ACC championships (the 2004 team turned down a bowl invitation as punishment for a massive brawl during a game against the University of South Carolina). Bowden has been criticized for his teams underachieving. The 2000 Tigers started 8–0 and rose as high as No. 5 in the polls before losing three of their last four. The same thing happened during the 2006 season following a 7–1 start and with the team on the verge of winning the ACC Atlantic Division. The Tigers have also shown great resolve at points during Bowden's tenure. The 2003 team won four games at the end of the season to finish 9–4, which included victories over No. 3 Florida State and No. 7 Tennessee in the Chick-Fil-A Peach Bowl. The 2004 season saw the Tigers start 1–4 only to win five of their last six games (which included an overtime upset of No. 10 Miami), while the 2005 team overcame a 2–3 start to finish the season 9–4. Tommy Bowden agreed to resign for $3.5 million on October 13, 2008, after leading the team to a disappointing 3–3 record (1–2 ACC) at the midpoint of a season in which the Tigers were an almost unanimous preseason pick to win their first ACC title under Bowden and were ranked No. 9 in the preseason polls. Assistant coach Dabo Swinney was named interim head coach.

=== Dabo Swinney era (2008–present) ===
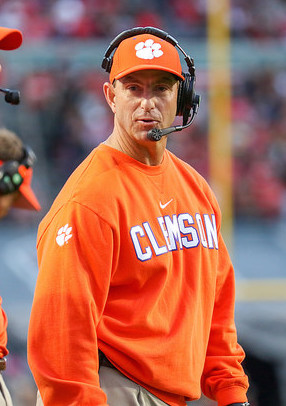
Coach Swinney

Following the departure of Tommy Bowden, wide receivers coach Dabo Swinney was dubbed interim head coach and led the Tigers to a 4–2 record, finishing the 2008 regular season at 7–6. On December 1, Clemson removed the "interim" tag from Swinney's title and named him the 27th head coach in school history, with a five-year contract.

On November 21, 2009, Swinney and the Tigers qualified for their first ACC title game berth, only to lose to the Georgia Tech Yellow Jackets 39–34. They were awarded a trip to the 2009 Music City Bowl, and defeated the Kentucky Wildcats 21–13, avenging their upset loss in the 2006 Music City Bowl. During the 2010 season, after a close 24–27 overtime loss to national champion Auburn on the road, Clemson was later defeated in the Meineke Car Care Bowl in Charlotte, North Carolina. In January 2011, Swinney hired new offensive coordinator Chad Morris. Morris became tied with Gus Malzahn as the highest paid assistant in college football after Clemson gave Morris a six-year contract worth $1.3 million annually. Dabo also added on running backs coach Tony Elliott, and defensive line coach Marion Hobby.

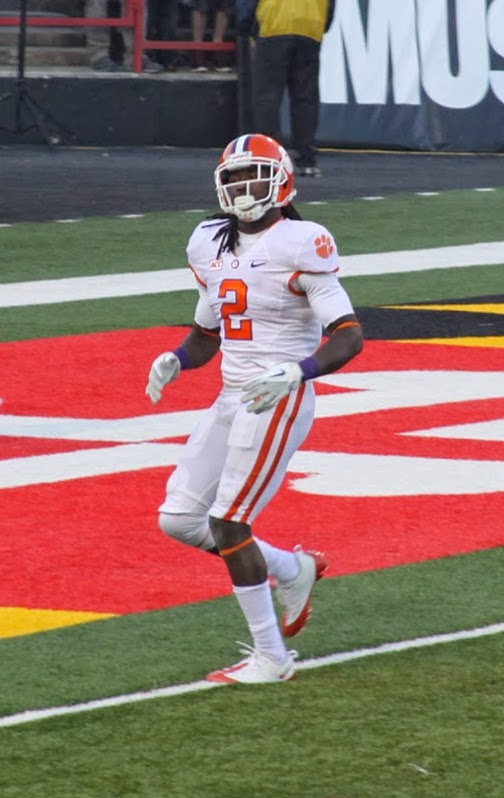
Sammy Watkins

On September 17, 2011, Clemson beat the defending national champions, the No. 21-ranked Auburn Tigers, and ended Auburn's 17-game winning streak, the longest winning streak in the nation. On October 1, 2011, Clemson became the first ACC team to beat three nationally ranked opponents in a row: No. 21-ranked Auburn, No. 11-ranked Florida State, and No. 11-ranked Virginia Tech. On November 12, 2011, Clemson defeated Wake Forest, winning the ACC Atlantic Division title. On November 26, 2011, Clemson lost to South Carolina for the third straight year, the first time Clemson had lost three straight to its instate rival since the seasons from 1968 to 1970. On December 3, the Tigers won their first ACC Championship since 1991, defeating Virginia Tech 38–10 in the Championship Game. However, in the 2012 Orange Bowl, their first major-bowl appearance since the 1981 national championship season, No. 15 Clemson was routed by No. 23 West Virginia 70–33, giving up an all-time record number of points scored in a quarter (35), half (49) and game (70) in the 109-year history of bowl games.

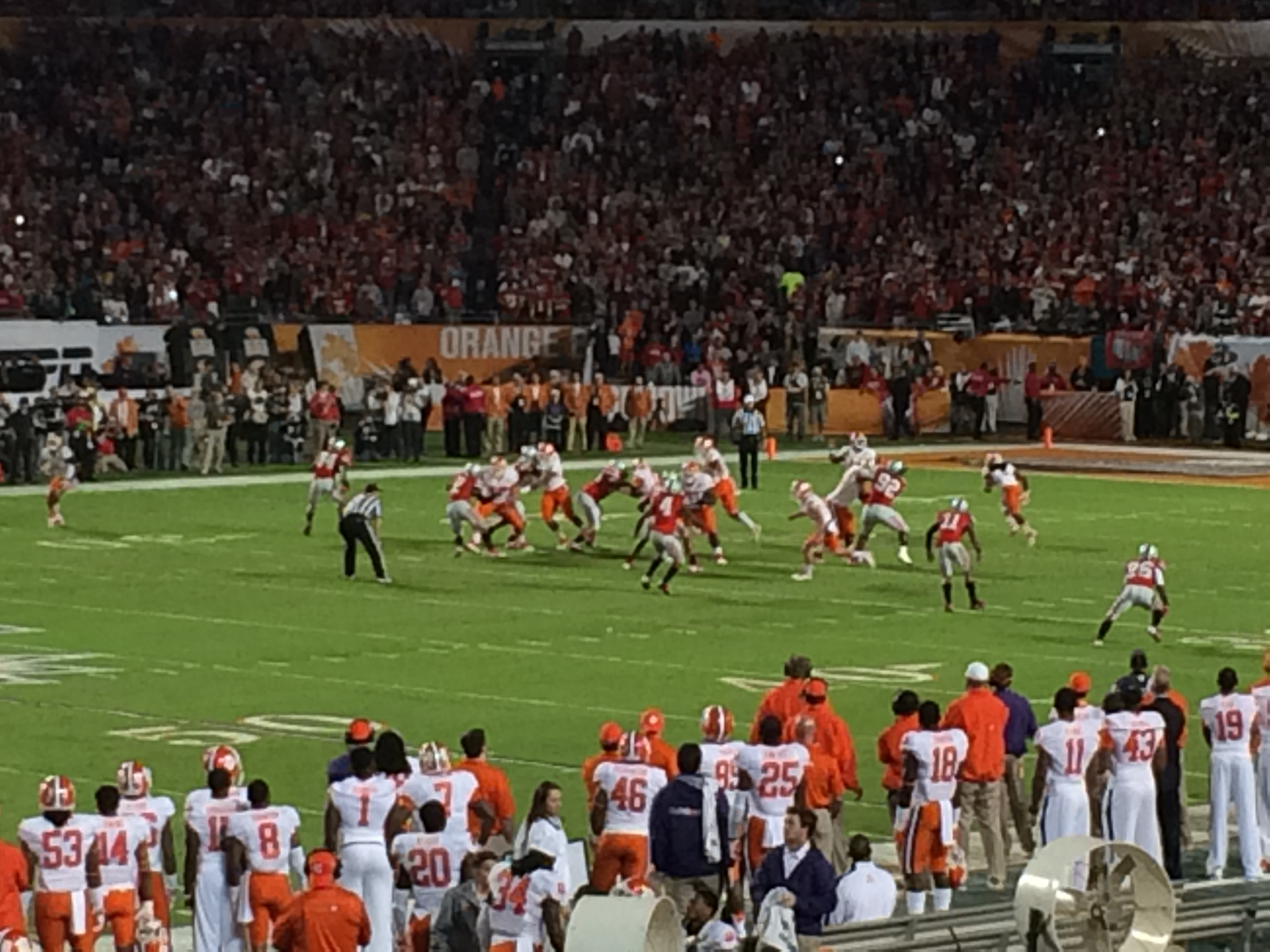
On January 3, 2014, Clemson defeated Ohio State 40–35 in the 2014 Discover Orange Bowl at Sun Life Stadium.

On December 31, 2012, Clemson achieved its first 11-win season since the national championship year with a last-second upset win over the No. 8 LSU Tigers in the Chick-fil-A Bowl. Clemson trailed 24–13 in the fourth quarter, but rallied back with a game-winning drive that saw a 4th and 16 conversion deep in their own territory that would lead to Chandler Catanzaro's 37-yard field goal as time expired to give Clemson a 25–24 win.

The 2013 season was historic for the Clemson football program. The Tigers began the season with a 38–35 home victory over rival and fifth-ranked Georgia and ended the regular season with a record fifth-straight loss to arch-rival South Carolina, 31–17, in the first Top 10 meeting of the two schools (Clemson No. 4, Carolina No. 9). The Tigers finished 11–2 in 2013 and secured the school's first ever BCS bowl win with a 40–35 victory over No. 7 Ohio State in the Orange Bowl. Quarterback Tajh Boyd and wide receiver Sammy Watkins set Orange Bowl yardage records. Boyd compiled 505 total yards and threw five touchdowns. It was the Tigers fourth win over a top 10 opponent under Swinney.

Clemson finished 10–3 in 2014, highlighted by a 35–17 win over arch-rival South Carolina and a 40–6 win over Oklahoma in the Russell Athletic Bowl. The Tigers took on ACC rival Florida State in week 3 of their season only to suffer a loss in overtime as No. 22 Clemson lost to No. 1 Florida State 17–23. The Tigers then claimed a six-game winning streak in the middle of their season but lost to Georgia Tech as star freshman quarterback Deshaun Watson went out with a knee injury early in the 1st quarter. The Tigers claimed the nation's number 1-ranked defense under defensive coordinator Brent Venables in 2014, and the emergence of freshman quarterback Deshaun Watson propelled the Tigers to another 10-win season for the 4th time in Dabo Swinney's six years as head coach.

The 2015 season is regarded by sports writers as one of the most successful seasons in Clemson history. The Tigers possessed the nation's number 1 ranking throughout the second half of the regular season and ended with 14–1 overall record. Behind the leadership of Heisman Trophy finalist Deshaun Watson, the Tigers won the 2015 ACC Championship against number 10 North Carolina by a score of 45–37. The Tigers were selected to participate in the 2016 College Football Playoff as the top-seeded team in the tournament. Clemson defeated the No. 4 ranked Oklahoma Sooners in the 2015 Orange Bowl by a score of 37–17 to advance to the 2016 College Football Playoff National Championship game against the number 2-ranked Alabama Crimson Tide on January 11, 2016. Clemson lost the 2016 College Football Playoff National Championship Game to Alabama, 45–40 ending the school's 17-game winning streak. Heisman finalist quarterback Deshaun Watson had a historic performance setting the record for most total yards in national championship game history, with 478 yards (405 passing; 73 rushing) against the nation's best defense, and becoming the first player in history to amass over 4,000 yards passing and 1,000 yards rushing in a single season.

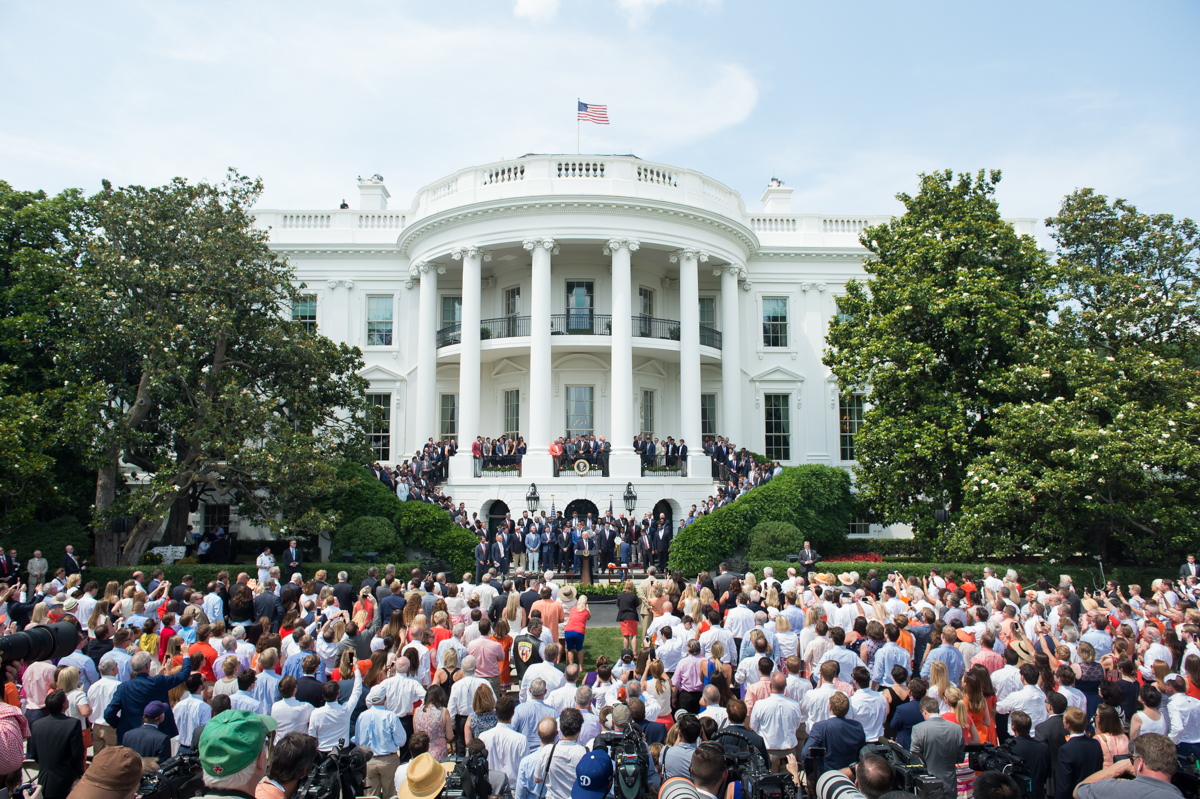
2016 Clemson Tigers football team behind the President visiting the White House in 2017.

In August 2016, ESPN.com reported that the 2016–2017 preseason Coaches Top 25 poll ranked Clemson Tigers football as the No. 2 team in the nation. With a loaded offense and plenty of young talent waiting to emerge on defense, Clemson entered 2016 as one of the frontrunners to contend for the national championship. Clemson once again won the conference and finished the regular season at 12–1. Clemson finished the season with wins at Auburn, Georgia Tech, and No. 12 Florida State on the road and defeated No. 3 Louisville in Memorial Stadium.

The Tigers suffered a 43–42 home loss to Pitt in November, but benefited from losses by a couple of other playoff contenders on that Saturday and finished the season with three straight victories to rank No. 2 in the final CFP rankings. As expected from last season's returning starters, quarterback Deshaun Watson anchored an explosive offense that averaged 503 yards per game. The defense reloaded behind a standout defensive line and limited opponents to just 18.4 points a game. Clemson finished with a regular season record of 12–1, which culminated with a 56–7 win at home over arch-rival South Carolina, Swinney's largest margin of victory over the Gamecocks during his career. Clemson won the ACC championship and secured its second trip to the CFP National Championship with a 31–0 shutout of semi-finalist No. 3 Ohio State in the 2016 Fiesta Bowl. The Tigers competed in the College Football Playoff National Championship game in Tampa, Florida on January 9, 2017, beating the previously undefeated Alabama Crimson Tide 35–31 on a game-winning touchdown with one second remaining, and winning the 2016 National Championship.

Swinney capped off a historical season in 2018 as the Tigers finished 15–0, marking the first time a college team had done so since 1897. Clemson defeated No. 1 ranked Alabama 44–16 in the CFP National Championship. The Tigers recorded the most wins in a single season for Clemson. Freshman quarterback Trevor Lawrence threw for 347 yards and 3 touchdowns in the Tigers' rout of the Crimson Tide. The Tigers also defeated No. 3 Notre Dame 30–3 in the Cotton Bowl in the semi-finals of the playoff. It was Clemson's second national title in three years and the third in school history. Clemson began the 2019 NCAA Division I FBS football season with high expectations, having received the pre-season No. 1 ranking in both the AP and Coaches' polls. However, Clemson had a sluggish start to the season culminating in a scare against North Carolina, where Clemson had to stop the Tarheels on a two-point conversion to escape Chapel Hill with a win. Trevor Lawrence struggled to begin the season, however, he began to hit his stride following the match up against Louisville, after he which he led the NCAA in multiple passing categories and failed to throw an interception the rest of the season. Clemson went on to capture both their fifth straight ACC Atlantic Division and ACC conference title, having defeated Virginia in the 2019 ACC Championship Game by a score of 62–17. Clemson finished a second straight year with an undefeated regular season, having also defeated South Carolina for a sixth straight time. Clemson received a berth to the 2019 Fiesta Bowl (December) against the Ohio State Buckeyes, their fifth straight College Football Playoff appearance. They defeated Ohio State by a score of 29–23, with Lawrence leading the team on a 94-yard drive culminating in a touchdown pass to Travis Etienne to take the lead in the end of the game and Buckeye quarterback Justin Fields throwing an interception in the Clemson end zone to seal the victory for the Tigers. Clemson then played the LSU Tigers in the 2020 College Football Playoff National Championship. LSU eventually took the lead and run away with the championship, winning 42–25 over Clemson. Clemson finished the 2019 season 14–1 and No. 2 in both polls. This was the Tigers' fifth straight season finishing in the top 4 for either poll. Clemson also ended a 29-game winning streak that was the nation's longest from 2018 to 2019.

For the 2020 season, Clemson was again ranked pre-season No. 1 by both the AP and the Coaches' polls. In June, 37 players tested positive for COVID during voluntary workouts. Standout defensive end Xavier Thomas announced he would redshirt the season due to the effects of the virus.

In the 2021 season, Clemson was stuck in the offense, lost 3 games, and missed the playoff berth first time since 2015. In the Cheez-It Bowl of 2021 season, they beat Iowa State 20–13. In 2022, Clemson defeated Syracuse 27–21, extending the Tigers' home winning streak to 38, a new ACC record. However, in the 2022 Palmetto Bowl, Clemson's ACC record home-winning streak came to an end with a 31–30 loss to archrival South Carolina. After the 2022 season, Swinney fired offensive coordinator Brandon Streeter and replaced him with 2022 Broyles Award winner Garrett Riley.
