= Graham Neff =

American college sports administrator

Current position
- Title: Athletic director
- Team: Clemson
- Conference: ACC

Biographical details
- Born: 1983 (age 42–43); Atlanta, Georgia, U.S.
- Education: Georgia Tech (B.S., M.B.A.)

Administrative career (AD unless noted)
- 2011–2012: Middle Tennessee State (finance, facilities and external operations)
- 2013: Clemson (associate AD of finance and facilities)
- 2014–2021: Clemson (deputy AD)
- 2022–present: Clemson

Graham Neff (born 1983) is the athletics director at Clemson University. He previously served as Clemson's deputy athletics director from 2014 to 2021 and associate athletic director of finance and facilities in 2013. Prior to that, Neff served in senior administrative roles specializing in finance, facilities and external operations at Middle Tennessee State University from 2011 to 2012.

Neff received his B.S. and M.B.A at Georgia Tech before embarking on his administrative career.

== Early life and education ==
A native of Gwinnett County, Georgia, Neff attended Parkview High School, near Lilburn, Georgia. He then attended Georgia Tech, where he earned a bachelor's degree in civil engineering in 2006. He then earned his master's degree in business administration in 2010.

== Administrative career ==
=== Middle Tennessee State ===
Neff began his administrative career at Middle Tennessee State University in their athletics department serving in several senior administrative roles, with emphasis in finance, facilities and external operations.

=== Clemson ===
In 2013, Neff joined Clemson University as their associate athletic director of finance and facilities, working closely with athletic director Dan Radakovich.

In 2014, Radakovich promoted Neff to deputy athletic director. During his tenure as deputy athletic director, Neff has overseen more than $200 million in capital projects, assisted in the negotiation of several high-value contracts and helped shape Clemson’s athletic department physically, operationally and financially.

Neff has also helped develop several key areas of the department, including the financial philosophy, fundraising, student-athlete welfare, and external operations management, and in 2019 was named one of Sports Business Daily’s Power Players.

On December 9, 2021, Neff was named the interim athletic director following the departure of Dan Radakovich, who left to become the athletic director at the University of Miami. On December 23, 2021, Neff was officially named as the athletics director at Clemson University.

== Personal life ==
Neff is married to his wife, Kristin, and they have three sons together, Grady, Emmett and Nolan.
