= List of Atlantic Coast Conference national championships =

The list of ACC national champions begins in the Atlantic Coast Conference's first full academic year of competition in 1953 and, through the 2023-2024 academic year, totals 144 NCAA team national championships and 8 FBS national championships in football. ACC members won a total of six national championships in the 2023-24 school year—in women's cross country (NC State), field hockey (North Carolina), men's soccer (Clemson), women's soccer (Florida State), women's swimming and diving (Virginia), and men's lacrosse (Notre Dame).

Listed below are all championship teams of NCAA sponsored events, as well as the titles won in football, which is not an official NCAA-sanctioned championship. Up to 1982, teams representing member schools also claimed five Association for Intercollegiate Athletics for Women championships.

== Totals by school ==
The following table ranks ACC schools by the number of NCAA recognized national championships each school has won as an ACC member. This does not include Division I-A/FBS football championships, or Association for Intercollegiate Athletics for Women championships. This list also does not include national championships won by new ACC members Stanford, Cal or SMU.

Institution	Nickname	Location	Founded	Joined Conference	Varsity Sports	ACC NCAA Championships (as of June 25, 2024)	Non-ACC NCAA Championships
Boston College	Eagles	Chestnut Hill, Massachusetts	1863	2005	31	4	2
Clemson University	Tigers	Clemson, South Carolina	1889	1953	19	5	0
Duke University	Blue Devils	Durham, North Carolina	1838	1953	20	17	0
Florida State University	Seminoles	Tallahassee, Florida	1851	1991	17	7	4
Georgia Institute of Technology	Yellow Jackets	Atlanta, Georgia	1885	1978	17	1	0
University of Louisville	Cardinals	Louisville, Kentucky	1798	2014	21	0	2
University of Miami	Hurricanes	Coral Gables, Florida	1925	2004	17	0	5
University of North Carolina at Chapel Hill	Tar Heels	Chapel Hill, North Carolina	1789	1953	27	50	0
North Carolina State University	Wolfpack	Raleigh, North Carolina	1887	1953	25	6	0
University of Notre Dame	Fighting Irish	South Bend, Indiana	1842	2013	23	9	15
University of Pittsburgh	Panthers	Pittsburgh, Pennsylvania	1787	2013	19	0	0
Syracuse University	Orange	Syracuse, New York	1870	2013	20	3	13
University of Virginia	Cavaliers	Charlottesville, Virginia	1819	1953	26	33	1
Virginia Polytechnic Institute and State University	Hokies	Blacksburg, Virginia	1872	2004	21	0	0
Wake Forest University	Demon Deacons	Winston-Salem, North Carolina	1834	1953	18	10	0

== Fall sports ==
=== Men's cross country (1) ===
Year	School
2015	Syracuse

- Prior to joining the ACC in 2013, Syracuse won one NCAA team title in 1951.
- Prior to joining the ACC in 2013, Notre Dame won one NCAA team title in 1957.

=== Women's cross country (8) ===
Year	School	Notes
1979	NC State	AIAW
1980	NC State	AIAW
1981	Virginia	
1982	Virginia	
2021	NC State	
2022	NC State	
2023	NC State	
2025	NC State	

=== Field hockey (23) ===
Year	School
1987	Maryland
1989	North Carolina
1993	Maryland
1995	North Carolina
1996	North Carolina
1997	North Carolina
1999	Maryland
2002	Wake Forest
2003	Wake Forest
2004	Wake Forest
2005	Maryland
2006	Maryland
2007	North Carolina
2008	Maryland
2009	North Carolina
2010	Maryland
2011	Maryland
2015	Syracuse
2018	North Carolina
2019	North Carolina
2020	North Carolina
2022	North Carolina
2023	North Carolina

=== Football (8) ===
The NCAA does not name an official champion for Division I-A/FBS football. The following table lists national titles that are reported by the NCAA's web page.

Year	School	Notes
1953	Maryland	AP, Coaches, UPI
1981	Clemson	AP, Coaches, UPI
1990	Georgia Tech	Coaches
1993	Florida State	AP, Coaches
1999	Florida State	AP, BCS, Coaches
2013	Florida State	AP, BCS, Coaches
2016	Clemson	AP, CFP, Coaches
2018	Clemson	AP, CFP, Coaches

- Prior to joining the ACC in 2024, SMU was named national champion in 1935 (Berryman (QPRS), Dickinson System, Houlgate System, Sagarin Ratings), 1981 (National Championship Foundation), and 1982 (Helms Athletic Foundation).
- Prior to joining the ACC in 2013, Syracuse won a national championship in 1959.
- Prior to joining the ACC in 2013, Pittsburgh claims national championships in 1915, 1916, 1918, 1929, 1931, 1934, 1936, 1937, and 1976. Other sources credit the Panthers with up to 8 additional national championships. See Pitt football national championships for more details.
- Prior to joining the ACC in 2005, Boston College claims a national championship in 1940.
- Prior to joining the ACC in 2004, Miami was named national champion in 1983 (AP & UPI), 1987 (AP & UPI), 1989 (AP & Coaches), 1991 (AP), and 2001 (AP, Coaches, BCS).
- Prior to joining the ACC in 1978, Georgia Tech was named national champion in 1917, 1928, and 1952 by the Helms Athletic Foundation.
- Notre Dame, which joined the ACC in non-football sports in 2013 but remains an FBS independent, officially claims 11 national titles. Many sources, however, credit the Fighting Irish with 13 titles. See Notre Dame Fighting Irish football national championships for more details.

=== Men's soccer (20) ===
Year	School	Notes
1968	Maryland	Shared with Michigan State; championship match was tied after two overtime periods.
1984	Clemson	
1987	Duke	
1988	Clemson	
1989	Virginia	Shared with Santa Clara; championship match was stopped after two overtime periods due to weather.
1991	Virginia	
1992	Virginia	
1993	Virginia	
1994	Virginia	
2001	North Carolina	
2005	Maryland	
2007	Wake Forest	
2008	Maryland	
2009	Virginia	
2011	North Carolina	
2013	Notre Dame	
2014	Virginia	
2021	Clemson	
2022	Syracuse	
2023	Clemson	

=== Women's soccer (26) ===
Year	School	Notes
1981	North Carolina	AIAW
1982	North Carolina	
1983	North Carolina	
1984	North Carolina	
1986	North Carolina	
1987	North Carolina	
1988	North Carolina	
1989	North Carolina	
1990	North Carolina	
1991	North Carolina	
1992	North Carolina	
1993	North Carolina	
1994	North Carolina	
1996	North Carolina	
1997	North Carolina	
1999	North Carolina	
2000	North Carolina	
2003	North Carolina	
2006	North Carolina	
2008	North Carolina	
2009	North Carolina	
2012	North Carolina	
2014	Florida State	
2018	Florida State	
2021	Florida State	
2023	Florida State	

- Prior to joining the ACC in 2013, Notre Dame won three national titles (1995, 2004, 2010).

== Winter sports ==
=== Men's basketball (15) ===
Year	School	Notes
1957	North Carolina	
1974	NC State	
1982	North Carolina	
1983	NC State	
1991	Duke	
1992	Duke	
1993	North Carolina	
2001	Duke	
2002	Maryland	
2005	North Carolina	
2009	North Carolina	
2010	Duke	
2015	Duke	
2017	North Carolina	
2019	Virginia	

- Prior to joining the ACC in 2013, Syracuse won one NCAA title (2003).
- Prior to joining the ACC in 2014, Louisville won two NCAA titles (1980, 1986). A third title in 2013 was vacated due to NCAA sanctions stemming from a major sex scandal.
- Prior to 1939 the NCAA did not sanction a post-season tournament to determine a national champion. Some schools claim basketball national championships based on polls from this era. Four current ACC schools claim pre-1939 national titles:
  - North Carolina (1924)
  - Notre Dame (1927, 1936)
  - Pittsburgh (1928, 1930)
  - Syracuse (1918, 1926)

=== Women's basketball (3) ===
Year	School
1994	North Carolina
2006	Maryland
2018	Notre Dame

- Prior to joining the ACC in 2013, Notre Dame won one NCAA title (2001).

=== Men's ice hockey (3) ===
Year	School
2008	Boston College
2010	Boston College
2012	Boston College

- The ACC does not sanction men's ice hockey. Boston College competes as a member of Hockey East. The Eagles also won national championships in 1949 and 2001 prior to their joining the ACC in 2005.

=== Women's indoor track and field (1) ===
Year	School	Notes
1981	Virginia	AIAW

- Prior to joining the ACC in 1991, Florida State won one NCAA team title in 1985.

=== Women's swimming and diving (4) ===
Year	School
2021	Virginia
2022	Virginia
2023	Virginia
2024	Virginia

=== Fencing (5) ===
Year	School
2017	Notre Dame
2018	Notre Dame
2021	Notre Dame
2022	Notre Dame
2023	Notre Dame

- The ACC reinstated fencing as a sponsored sport in the 2014–15 school year.
- Prior to joining the ACC in 2013, Notre Dame won a total of eight national team titles: three men's (1977, 1978, 1986), one women's (1987), and four combined titles (1994, 2003, 2005, 2011).

=== Men's Gymnastics ===
The ACC does not currently sponsor men's gymnastics as a conference sport. However, current ACC schools have won national championships.

- Prior to joining the ACC in 1991, Florida State won national championships in men's gymnastics in 1951 and 1952.

== Spring sports ==
=== Baseball (2) ===
Year	School
1955	Wake Forest
2015	Virginia

- Prior to joining the ACC in 2004, Miami won national championships in baseball in 1982, 1985, 1999, and 2001.

=== Men's golf (4) ===
Year	School
1974	Wake Forest
1975	Wake Forest
1986	Wake Forest
2003	Clemson

- Prior to joining the ACC in 2013, Notre Dame won an NCAA national championship in men's golf in 1944.

=== Women's golf (8) ===
Year	School
1999	Duke
2002	Duke
2005	Duke
2006	Duke
2007	Duke
2014	Duke
2019	Duke
2023	Wake Forest

- Prior to joining the ACC in 2004, Miami won the DGWS championship in 1970, AIAW championships in 1972, 1977, and 1978, and an NCAA national championship in 1984.
- Prior to joining the ACC in 1991, Florida State won the AIAW championship in 1981.

=== Men's lacrosse (24) ===
Year	School	Notes
1955	Maryland	Wingate Memorial Trophy
1956	Maryland	Wingate Memorial Trophy
1959	Maryland	Wingate Memorial Trophy
1967	Maryland	Wingate Memorial Trophy
1970	Maryland	Wingate Memorial Trophy
1972	Virginia	
1973	Maryland	
1975	Maryland	
1981	North Carolina	
1982	North Carolina	
1986	North Carolina	
1991	North Carolina	
1999	Virginia	
2003	Virginia	
2006	Virginia	
2010	Duke	
2011	Virginia	
2013	Duke	
2014	Duke	
2016	North Carolina	
2019	Virginia	
2021	Virginia	
2023	Notre Dame	
2024	Notre Dame	

- Note: the NCAA began sanctioning men's lacrosse in 1971. Prior championships were awarded by the United States Intercollegiate Lacrosse Association.
- Prior to becoming a charter member of the ACC in 1953, Maryland won non-NCAA national championships in 1928, 1936, 1937, 1939, and 1940.
- Prior to becoming a charter member of the ACC in 1953, Virginia won a non-NCAA national championship in 1952.
- Prior to joining the ACC in 2013, Syracuse won four non-NCAA national championships (1920, 1922, 1924, 1925) and 10 NCAA national championships (1983, 1988, 1989, 1993, 1995, 2000, 2002, 2004, 2008, 2009). Another championship in 1990 was vacated due to NCAA violations.

=== Women's lacrosse (17) ===
Year	School	Notes
1981	Maryland	AIAW
1986	Maryland	
1991	Virginia	
1992	Maryland	
1993	Virginia	
1995	Maryland	
1996	Maryland	
1997	Maryland	
1998	Maryland	
1999	Maryland	
2000	Maryland	
2001	Maryland	
2004	Virginia	
2010	Maryland	
2013	North Carolina	
2014	Maryland	
2016	North Carolina	
2021	Boston College	
2022	North Carolina	

=== Men's outdoor track and field (2) ===
Year	School
2006	Florida State
2008	Florida State

- Florida State's 2007 national championship was vacated by the NCAA's Committee on Infractions.

=== Women's outdoor track and field ===
- Prior to joining the ACC in 1991, Florida State won one NCAA team title in 1984.

=== Women's rowing (2) ===
Year	School
2010	Virginia
2012	Virginia

=== Softball (1) ===
Year	School
2018	Florida State

=== Women's tennis (3) ===
Year	School
2007	Georgia Tech
2009	Duke
2023	North Carolina

=== Men's tennis (7) ===
Year	School
2013	Virginia
2015	Virginia
2016	Virginia
2017	Virginia
2018	Wake Forest
2022	Virginia
2023	Virginia

- Prior to joining the ACC in 2013, Notre Dame won one NCAA team title (1959, shared with Tulane).

== Discontinued Sports ==
=== Boxing ===
- Prior to joining the ACC in 2013, Syracuse won one NCAA team title in 1936.
- Prior to joining the ACC in 1953, Virginia won one NCAA team title in 1938.

== See also ==
- List of NCAA schools with the most NCAA Division I championships
