= The Tiger (mascot) =

Mascot of the Clemson Tigers

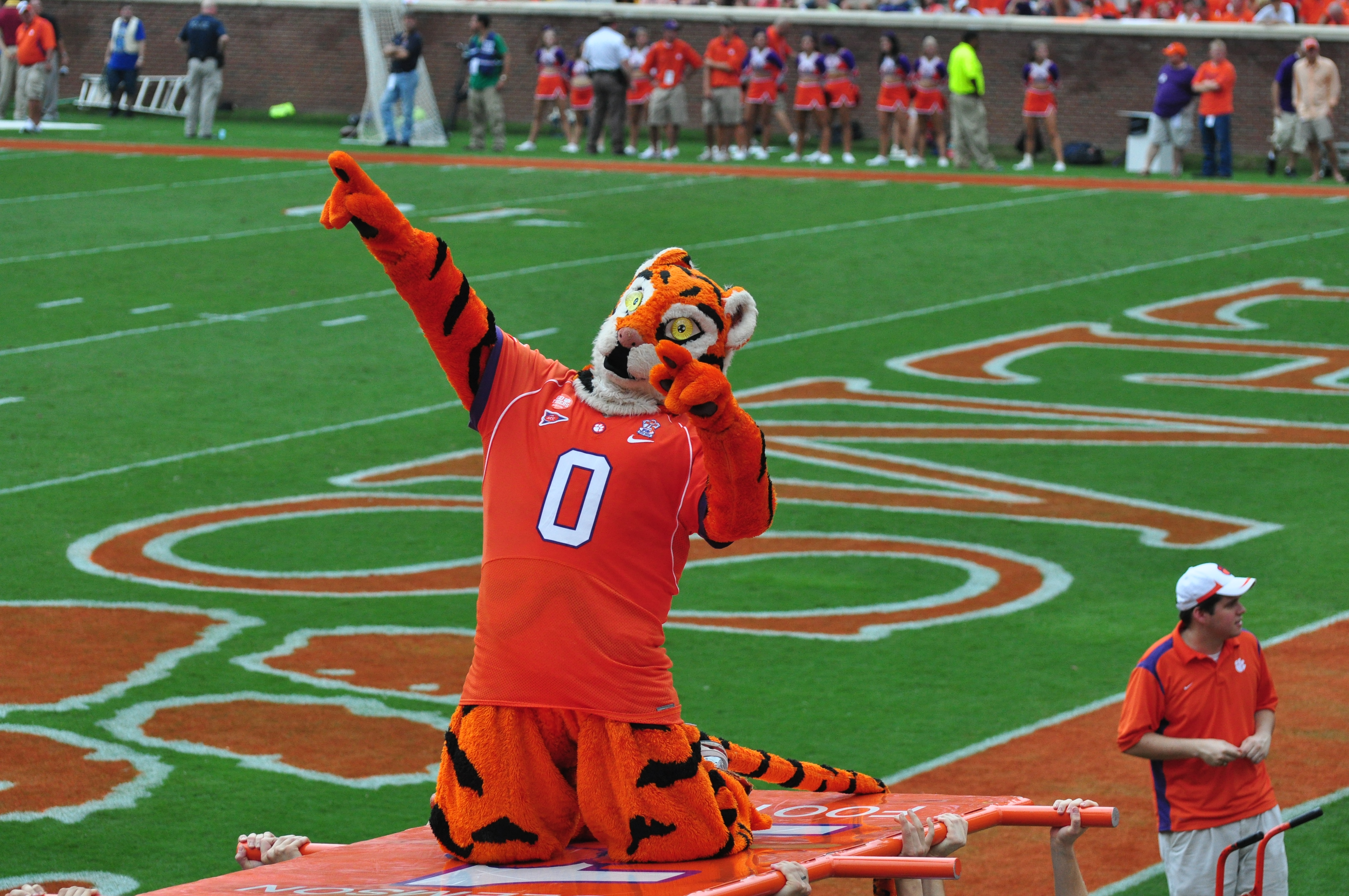
- The Tiger at a 2009 football game
- University: Clemson University
- Conference: ACC
- Description: Anthropomorphic tiger
- First seen: 1954

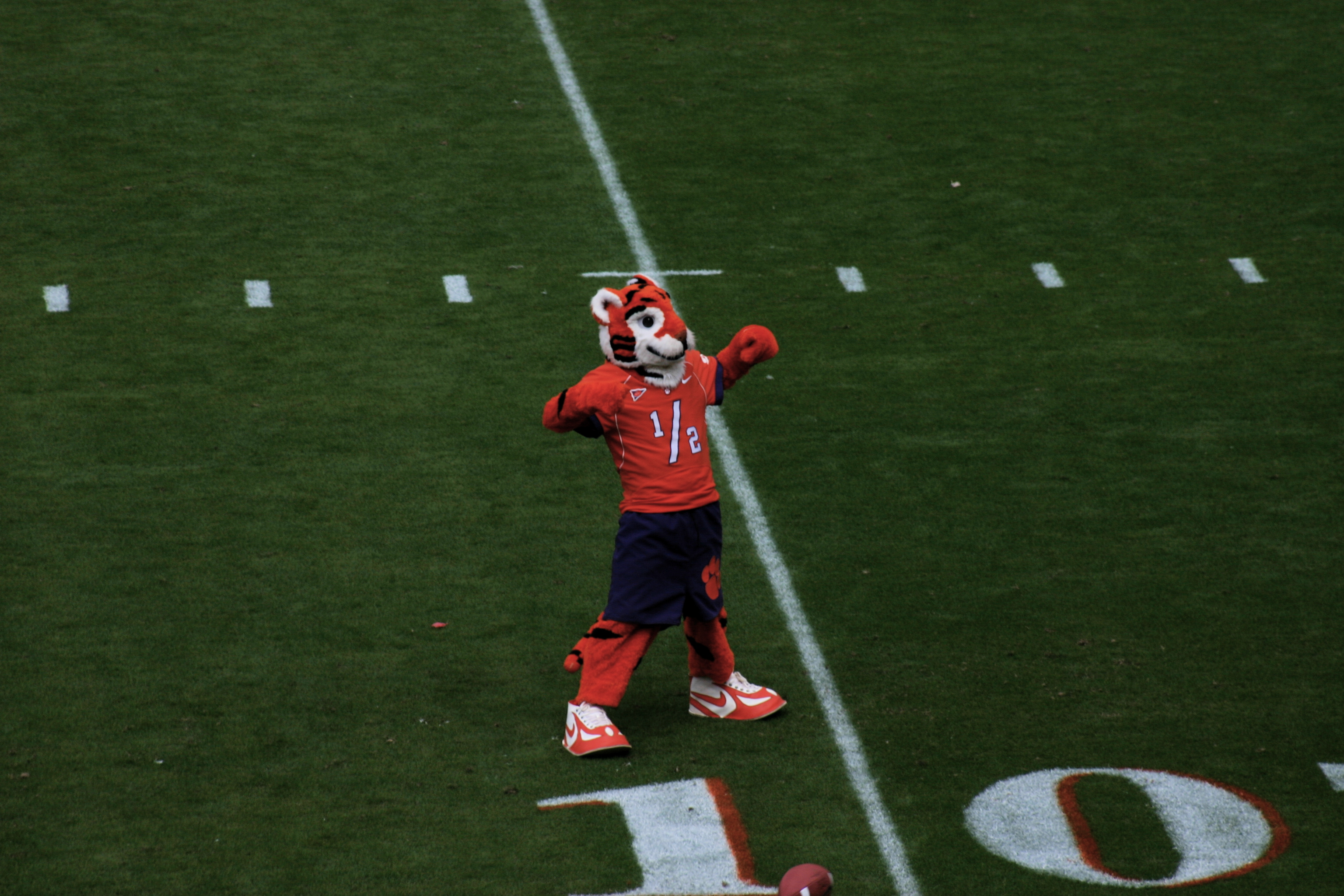
The Cub at a 2005 football game

The Tiger is the mascot of the Clemson Tigers, the athletic teams of Clemson University in Clemson, South Carolina. The anthropomorphized tiger is costumed in Acrylic/polyester fur, and in recent years wears a football, basketball, or baseball jersey or a T-shirt. The Tiger has a smaller companion, The Cub, who wears shorts, oversized sneakers, and a jersey numbered 1/2.

== History ==
Clemson's athletic teams have been nicknamed the Tigers since 1896, when coach (and later university president) Walter Merritt Riggs brought the name from his alma mater, Auburn University. The school's first costumed mascot was the Southern Gentleman, a student dressed in a purple formal suit with a top hat and cane. The name came from a Greenville News editor's nickname for Clemson students, and was discontinued in 1972. The first costumed tiger mascot appeared in 1954. A smaller, ostensibly younger, companion named The Cub was introduced in 1993.

The Tiger's wide, yellow eyes are perceived by some as frightening. In 2014, CBSSports.com named The Tiger #4 on its list of ten scariest college football mascots.

== Traditions ==
In 1978, mascot Zach Mills began the tradition of doing a number push-ups after every score equal to the number of points Clemson had in the game. Mills performed 287 push-ups in that game, a record that was later eclipsed by Ricky Capps, who performed 465 push-ups (including help from the Wake Demon Deacon) in an 82–24 victory over Wake Forest during the 1981 national championship season. The tradition is now commonly emulated by other college mascots.

The university maintains approximately four Tiger and Cub costumes.
