= Clemson Tigers =

Intercollegiate sports teams of Clemson University

- University: Clemson University
- Nickname: Tigers
- NCAA: Division I (FBS)
- Conference: Atlantic Coast Conference
- Athletic director: Graham Neff
- Location: Clemson, South Carolina
- Varsity teams: 21
- Football stadium: Memorial Stadium
- Basketball arena: Littlejohn Coliseum
- Baseball stadium: Doug Kingsmore Stadium
- Softball stadium: McWhorter Stadium
- Soccer stadium: Riggs Field
- Colors: Orange and regalia
- Mascot: The Tiger
- Fight song: "Tiger Rag"
- Website: clemsontigers.com

Atlantic Coast Conference logo in Clemson's colors

The Clemson Tigers are the athletic teams that represent Clemson University, located in Clemson, South Carolina. They compete as a member of the National Collegiate Athletic Association (NCAA) Division I level (Football Bowl Subdivision (FBS) for football). Clemson competes for and has won multiple NCAA Division I national championships in football, men's soccer, and men's golf. The Clemson Tigers field twenty-one athletic teams, nine men's and twelve women's, across thirteen sports.

Clemson was a founding member of the Atlantic Coast Conference (ACC), where it has competed since the 1953–54 season. Previously, they were a founding member of the Southern Conference from 1921 through 1953, and a member of the Southern Intercollegiate Athletic Association from 1896 through 1921.

== Traditions ==
=== Mascot ===
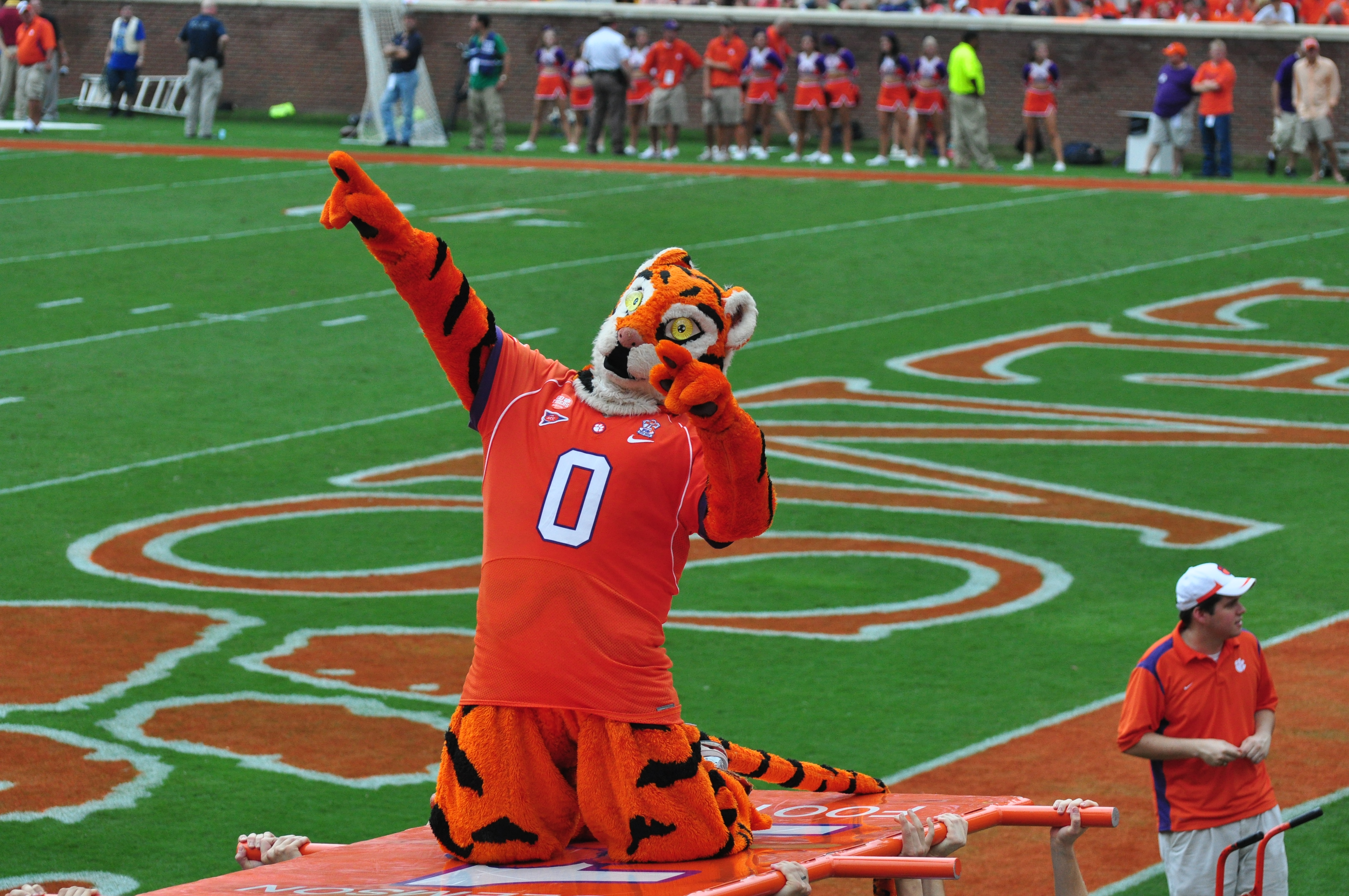
The Tiger, Clemson's mascot, here pictured in 2009

Clemson's teams have been known as the Tigers since 1896, when a member of the first football team named Thompson chose the name based on the then-dominant Princeton Tigers football team.

Clemson's costumed mascot, The Tiger, first appeared in 1954, with his companion, "The Cub" debuting in 1993. At football games, The Tiger does pushups equal to the total score Clemson has in the game, a tradition that began in 1980.

=== Tiger Band ===
Tiger Band evolved from regimental bands from Clemson's days as a military school. Tiger Band took its current form in 1955 after the school became coeducational. A smaller pep band performs at basketball games.

=== Fight song ===
Clemson's fight song is a rendition of the Original Dixieland Jazz Band's "Tiger Rag". In 1941, cadet band leader Robert Dean Ross bought the sheet music from an Atlanta music shop, and the band played the song after every touchdown beginning with the 1942 football season.

=== Tiger Paw logo ===
The Tiger Paw logo was introduced at a press conference on July 21, 1970. It was created by John Antonio and developed by Helen Weaver of Henderson Advertising in Greenville, South Carolina, from a mold of a Bengal tiger sent to the agency by the Field Museum of Natural History in Chicago. The telltale hook at the bottom of the paw is due to a scar that the tiger had and the hook at the bottom is also a sign that this is the official licensed trademark for the university.

== Athletic directors ==
- Walter Riggs (1896–1910)
- Frank Dobson (1910–1912)
- Bob Williams (1913–1915)
- Wayne Hart (1916)
- Edward Donahue (1917–1920)
- E. J. Stewart (1921–1922)
- Bud Saunders (1923–1926)
- Mutt Gee (1927–1930)
- Jess Neely (1931–1939)
- Frank Howard (1940–1971)
- Bill McLellan (1971–1985)
- Bobby Robinson (1985–2002)
- Terry Don Phillips (2002–2012)
- Dan Radakovich (2012–2021)
- Graham Neff (2022–present)

== Sports sponsored ==
Clemson sponsors teams in eight men's and eleven women's NCAA sanctioned sports. The first intercollegiate match in Clemson history was a baseball game on April 24, 1896, against Furman. The school's first football team followed that fall. Five women's sports were introduced in 1975 after the passage of Title IX.

Women's diving was the most recent sport to be dropped, following the 2017–18 season, while three sports have been added in recent years: softball (2020), women's lacrosse (2023), and gymnastics (2024).

Men's sports	Women's sports
Baseball	Softball
Basketball	Basketball
Cross country	Cross country
Soccer	Soccer
Football	Volleyball
Golf	Golf
Tennis	Tennis
Track and field^{1}	Track and field^{1}
	Gymnastics
	Lacrosse
	Rowing
^{1}includes both indoor and outdoor

=== Timeline ===
Team national championships marked with red lines.

=== Baseball ===
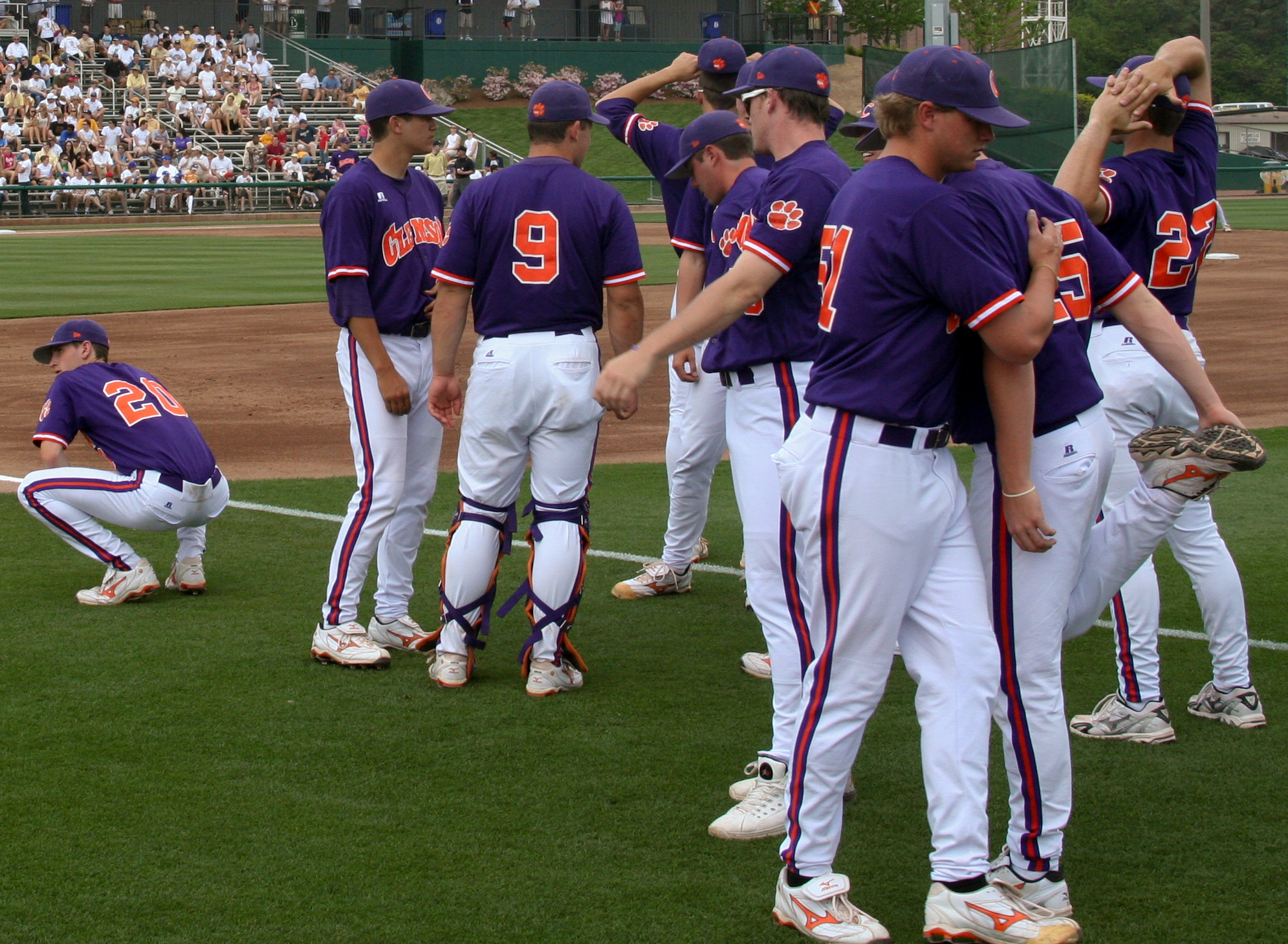
Members of the 2010 Clemson Tigers baseball team at Russ Chandler Stadium

As of 2018, the Tiger baseball team has posted a combined 32 ACC regular season and tournament championships (the most in the conference), 43 NCAA Tournament appearances, 17 NCAA Regional Titles, four NCAA Super Regional titles, and 12 College World Series appearances. Much of the baseball program's success occurred under Bill Wilhelm during his 35 seasons as Clemson's head coach. Erik Bakich is the Tigers' current head coach, having replaced Monte Lee after the conclusion of the 2022 season.

=== Basketball ===
The Clemson men's basketball team has qualified for the NCAA Tournament 13 times, and reached the Sweet 16 four times and the Elite Eight once. They are currently coached by Brad Brownell since 2010.

The Clemson women's basketball team began in 1975, and saw its biggest success in the late 1980s and 1990s. The Tigers reached the NCAA Elite Eight in 1991, and the Sweet Sixteen three times (1989, 1990, 1999). Women's basketball won two ACC Tournament championships in 1996 and 1999, and the regular season title in 1981. The team is currently coached by Amanda Butler.

=== Football ===
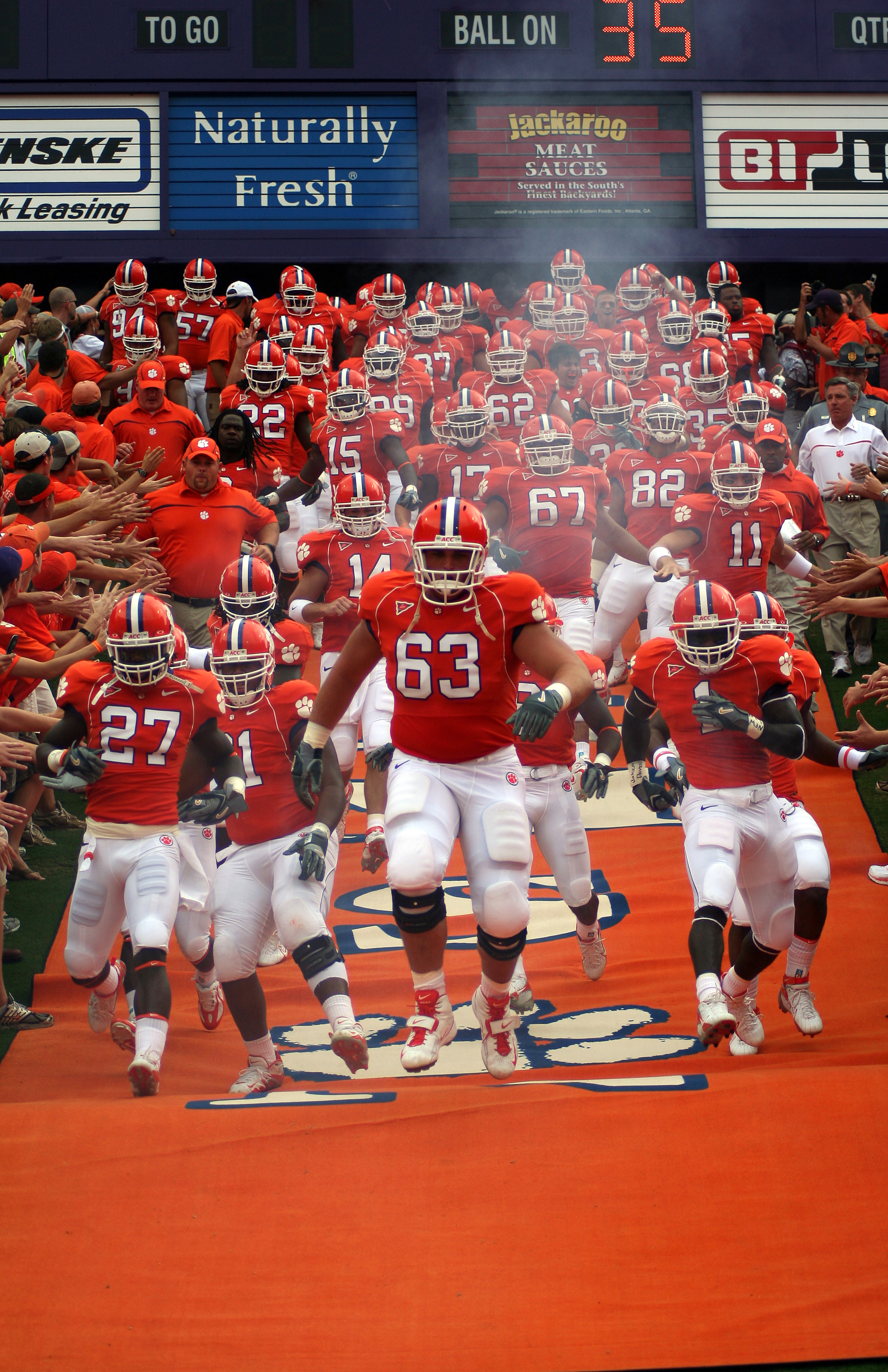
The Tigers take the field by running down the hill in Memorial Stadium's east end zone, 2006.

Clemson has three national championships in football, the most recent coming in 2018 with a victory over Alabama 44–16 in the 2019 College Football Playoff National Championship. Clemson has appeared in the last six playoffs and won two national championships during those visits. The Tigers also possess the most Atlantic Coast Conference championships with 20, including winning the last six.

It has also won greater than 60% of its games, placing it in the top 25 on the all-time winning percentage list. Clemson also won two Southern Conference titles before joining the ACC. The 1981 squad, led by Head Coach Danny Ford, became the first athletic team in school history to win a national championship. Clemson defeated Nebraska 22–15 in the Orange Bowl in Miami, Florida, to win the 1981 NCAA Football National Championship. Stars of the game included Homer Jordan (QB) and Perry Tuttle (WR). Clemson finished the year 12–0 and ranked #1 in the Associated Press and Coaches polls.

Some of the most notable coaching names in Clemson football history are John Heisman (who also coached at Akron, Auburn, Georgia Tech, Penn, Washington & Jefferson, and Rice; the Heisman Trophy is named after him), Jess Neely, Frank Howard (whom the playing field at Death Valley is named after), and Danny Ford. After Tommy Bowden resigned midseason on October 13, 2008, Dabo Swinney took over as interim head coach. On December 1, 2008, Swinney was named head coach of the Clemson Tigers football team.

Before each home game, the team ends pre-game warm ups and proceeds to the locker room. With five minutes to go before game time, three buses leave the street behind the West Endzone carrying the Clemson football players. The buses pull to a stop at the gate in front of The Hill, and the Tigers gather at the top, where each player proceeds to rub "Howard's Rock", which is an imported rock from Death Valley, California that was presented to Frank Howard in 1967. While Tiger Rag is played and a cannon sounds, the Tigers run down the hill onto the field in front of over 83,000 screaming fans. This tradition has been dubbed "The most exciting 25 seconds in college football" by sportscaster Brent Musburger.

=== Golf ===
The Tiger men's golf team have a tradition of being among the best in the ACC and the nation, having won several ACC titles and regularly qualifying for the NCAA Tournament. In 2003, Clemson defeated Oklahoma State to win its first National Championship in golf and the 4th overall for the school. In addition to that victory, Clemson also won the ACC and NCAA East Regional titles that year, making the Tigers the first program in NCAA history to win its conference, regional, and national championship tournaments in the same year. Clemson has also won eight regional titles since the NCAA adopted the regional tournament format in 1989, with their most recent win coming in 2024. Two Tigers have won individual NCAA Championships: Charles Warren in 1997 and Turk Pettit in 2021. 2009 U.S. Open champion Lucas Glover also played golf at Clemson.

=== Gymnastics ===
Clemson began sponsoring a women's gymnastics program in the 2024 season. Their gymnastics team made their competitive debut on January 12, 2024, winning their inaugural meet against William & Mary. The Tigers have appeared in the NCAA tournament in each of their first three seasons and captured the 2026 ACC Gymnastics Championship.

=== Lacrosse ===
Clemson began sponsoring a women's lacrosse program in the 2023 season. The Tigers made their first NCAA Tournament appearance in 2025.

=== Rowing ===
Clemson rowing blade

In 2009, the Lady Tigers rowing team became the first team other than Virginia to win the ACC Championship since the ACC began sponsoring the women's rowing championship in 2000. That year, Kelly Murphy, Lydia Hassell, Callen Erdeky, Allison Colberg, and Meredith Razzolini, won the NCAA title in Fours.

=== Soccer ===
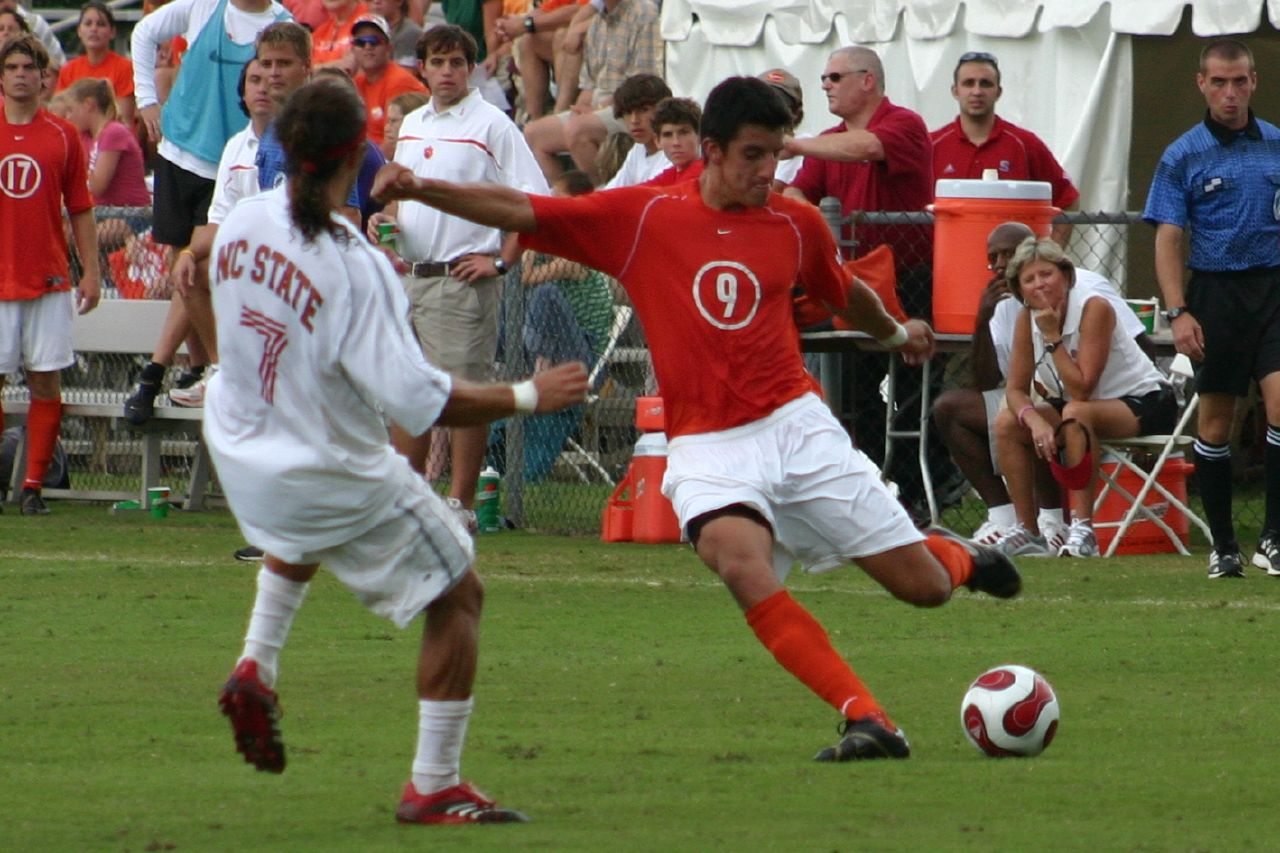
Clemson playing vs. NC State in September 2006

The men's soccer team was Clemson's second sports program to win a national championship, winning the NCAA Tournament in 1984, 1987, 2021, and 2023. In their 36 appearances in the NCAA tournament, the men's soccer team garnered runner-up finishes in 1979 and 2015, and has appeared in the NCAA Final Four ten times, with the 2023 squad being the most recent team to accomplish that feat. In addition to their NCAA titles, the men's program has won 16 combined ACC regular season and tournament titles, with the last one coming in the 2014 ACC Tournament. The Tigers have known five coaches in their history: Fred Kirchner (1934–1939, 8–6–4 record), I. M. Ibrahim (1967–1994, 388–100–31 career record), Trevor Adair (1995–2008, 50–48–10 record at Clemson), Phil Hindson (Interim coach in 2009, 6–12–1 record) and Mike Noonan (2010–present). Famous former Tigers include Oguchi Onyewu, Stuart Holden and Paul Stalteri, all three whom are capped for their respective nations, and Hermann Trophy winners Bruce Murray (1987), Wojtek Krakowiak (1998), and Robbie Robinson (2019).

Women's soccer became a varsity sport at Clemson in 1994. The women's soccer team has won the ACC regular season crown twice, and advanced to the NCAA tournament twenty-four times. The team has never been able to advance past the Semifinals of the NCAA tournament. However, the team has been able to reach the Quarterfinals six times, advancing to the Final Four in 2023. The Tigers have known five coaches in their history Tracey Leone (1994–1998, 89–39–4 career record), Ray Leone (1999–2000, 33–10–3 career record), Todd Bramble (2001–2007, 80–51–17 career record), Hershey Strosberg (2008–2010, 14–39–1 career record), and Eddie Radwanski (2011–present).

=== Softball ===
The Tigers first fielded a softball team in the COVID-19 pandemic-shortened 2020 season. In each of their full seasons, the Tigers have made the NCAA Tournament, and reached the Super Regional three times. Pitcher Valerie Cagle won both the Softball America and USA Softball Collegiate Player of the Year awards in 2023. Clemson won the ACC Regular Season Title in 2021 and the ACC Softball Tournament in 2025.

=== Tennis ===
Men's tennis became a varsity sport at Clemson in 1907. The Tigers have participated in the NCAA Tournament 23 times since dual match play began in 1977, and has been ranked in the top 25 by the Intercollegiate Tennis Association 19 times. Additionally, Lawson Duncan was runner-up in the 1984 NCAA Tournament in singles. Jay Berger was a two-time All-American for Clemson, and went on to a pro career in which his highest world ranking was #7.

The Tiger women have played in 22 NCAA Tournaments since 1976, reaching the semifinals in 2004 and 2005, and the quarterfinals in 1983. They also have 28 ITA Top 25 seasons, including finishing 5th in 2004. Individually, Josipa Bek and Keri Wong were finalists in doubles in 2011, and Gigi Fernández was finalist in singles in 1983, before winning Olympic gold medals in doubles in 1992 and 1996.

=== Track & field and cross country ===
Men's track and field was the third official sport at Clemson, with the program beginning in 1905. Cross country was added in 1915, and Clemson began indoor competition in 1931. The men's team finished second at the NCAA indoor meet in 1992 and 1993, and third in 1998 and 1999. Tiger athletes have won 12 indoor and three outdoor individual national titles, and the team has won 12 indoor, 11 outdoor, and seven cross country ACC championships.

Women's cross country began in 1975, followed by indoor & outdoor track & field in 1981. Women's athletes have won seven indoor and five outdoor national championships, while the team has won six indoor, seven outdoor, and one cross country ACC titles. The women's team has a best NCAA finish of third at the 2001 indoor meet.

=== Volleyball ===
The Tiger women's volleyball team has won one ACC Tournament championship (1997) and two regular season championships (1999 & 2007). The team has participated in the NCAA Tournament eight times since its inception in 1977.

=== Discontinued varsity sports ===
Boxing

Clemson began a boxing team in 1928. The team won the 1938 and 1940 Southern Conference championships, and produced seven individual SoCon champions.

Fencing

The Tigers began sponsoring men's fencing in 1970, followed by women's fencing in 1975. The men's team won the ACC championship in 1979, and participated in the NCAA tournament every year from 1976 through 1982, when they finished as runners-up. Three Tigers were named All-Americans: Steve Renshaw (1977, 1979–1980), Jay Thomas (1979–80, 1982), and Steve Wasserman (1980–1982).

The women's team reached the AIAW National tournament in 1981 and the inaugural women's NCAA tournament in 1982. The programs were discontinued following the 1982 season.

Field Hockey

Clemson's short-lived field hockey program operated from 1977 until 1981. The team had one All-American selection, Barbie Johnson in 1981.

Swimming & Diving

The Tigers men's swimming & diving team was established in 1919, and won the Southern Conference championship in 1939, and the ACC team championship in 1986. The women's swimming & diving team began in 1975, and won 4 ACC championships (1987, 1988, 1989, 1997), and Mitzi Kremer won 4 NCAA championships. Both swimming teams and men's diving were discontinued after the 2012 season, and women's diving was discontinued after 2017.

Wrestling

Wrestling at Clemson University was discontinued in 1995, despite the success of the program, due to financial shortages from Tiger Athletics' funding from the university. The wrestling program began in 1975 winning the ACC title as a team under coach Eddie Griffin in 1991. The Tiger wrestling program produced eight All-Americans, two NCAA Champions, and a finish at the NCAA Championships as high as 7th in 1994. Noel Loban won Clemson's first national title in 1980, and went on to win a bronze medal in the 1984 Olympics. Sammie Henson is a former standout at Clemson, as one of the most accomplished Tiger wrestlers, with 1993 and 1994 NCAA Champion titles, who eventually earned a 2000 Olympics silver medal and became a World Champion in 1998 in freestyle wrestling.

== Championships ==
=== Team national championships ===
Clemson University has five team national championships awarded by the NCAA in golf and soccer. Clemson also claims three Division I Football National Championships, in 1981, 2016, and 2018. These titles were not awarded by the NCAA, but by selectors designated as "major" by the NCAA, such as the AP and Coaches Poll in 1981, and by the College Football Playoff system in 2016 and 2018.

- Men's (8)
  - Golf (1): 2003
  - Soccer (4): 1984, 1987, 2021, 2023
  - Football (3): 1981, 2016, 2018
- see also:
  - ACC NCAA team championships
  - List of NCAA schools with the most NCAA Division I championships

=== Individual national championships ===
Clemson athletes have won 38 national championships in individual and relay events.

NCAA individual championships
School year	Athlete(s)	Sport	Event/class	Source
1979–80	Noel Loban	Men's wrestling	190-pound	
1982–83	Tina Krebs	Women's indoor track & field	1000 meter	
1984–85	Tina Krebs	Women's indoor track & field	Mile	
1986–87	Mitzi Kremer	Women's swimming	200 yard freestyle	
1986–87	Mitzi Kremer	Women's swimming	500 yard freestyle	
1988–89	Mitzi Kremer	Women's swimming	200 yard freestyle	
1988–89	Mitzi Kremer	Women's swimming	500 yard freestyle	
1988–89	Michael Radziwinski; David Wittman; Philip Greyling; Terrance Herrington	Men's indoor track & field	3200 meter relay	
1991–92	Michael Green	Men's indoor track & field	55 meter	
1991–92	James Trapp	Men's indoor track & field	200 meter	
1992–93	Michael Green	Men's indoor track & field	55 meter	
1992–93	Wesley Russell	Men's indoor track & field	400 meter	
1992–93	Sam Henson	Men's wrestling	118-pound	
1992–93	Michael Green	Men's outdoor track & field	100 meter	
1993–94	Sam Henson	Men's wrestling	118-pound	
1994–95	Duane Ross	Men's outdoor track & field	110 meter high hurdles	
1996–97	Charles Warren	Men's golf		
1997–98	Shawn Crawford	Men's indoor track & field	200 meter	
1998–99	Ato Modibo	Men's indoor track & field	400 meter	
1998–99	Charles Allen; Kenny Franklin; Davidson Gill; Ato Modibo	Men's indoor track & field	4x400 meter relay	
1999–2000	Shawn Crawford	Men's indoor track & field	200 meter	
1999–2000	Shawn Crawford	Men's outdoor track & field	200 meter	
2000–01	Cydonie Mothersill	Women's indoor track & field	200 meter	
2000–01	Michelle Burgher; Cydonie Mothersill; Marcia Smith; Shekera Weston	Women's outdoor track & field	4x400 meter relay	
2001–02	Jamine Moton	Women's outdoor track & field	Hammer throw	
2004–05	Gisele Oliveira	Women's indoor track & field	Triple Jump	
2006–07	Travis Padgett	Men's indoor track & field	60 meter	
2008–09	Kelly Murphy; Lydia Hassell; Callen Erdeky; Allison Colberg; Meredith Razzolini (coxswain)	Women's rowing	Fours	
2008–09	Jacoby Ford	Men's indoor track & field	60 meter	
2009–10	Patricia Mamona	Women's outdoor track & field	Triple Jump	
2010–11	Miller Moss	Men's indoor track & field	Heptathlon	
2010–11	Brianna Rollins	Women's indoor track & field	60 meter high hurdles	
2010–11	Patricia Mamona	Women's outdoor track & field	Triple Jump	
2012–13	Brianna Rollins	Women's indoor track & field	60 meter high hurdles	
2012–13	Brianna Rollins	Women's outdoor track & field	100 meter high hurdles	
2014–15	Natoya Goule	Women's indoor track & field	800 meter	
2020–21	Turk Pettit	Men's golf		

=== Conference championships ===
Championships are in the Atlantic Coast Conference unless noted.

Sport	Team championships	Individual championships
Baseball	18 (1 SoCon, 17 ACC)	n/a
Men's basketball	1	n/a
Women's basketball	2	n/a
Men's cross country	7	11
Women's cross country	1	2
Football	27 (4 SIAA, 2 SoCon, 21 ACC)	n/a
Fencing	1	3
Men's golf	11	8
Women's golf	0	0
Gymnastics	1	1
Men's indoor track	12	139 (2 SoCon, 137 ACC)
Women's indoor track	6	84
Women's lacrosse	0	n/a
Men's outdoor track	12	191 ACC (Note: No data available for pre-1953 Southern Conference individual champions)
Women's outdoor track	7	107
Rowing	1	6
Men's soccer	15	n/a
Women's soccer	0	n/a
Softball	1	n/a
Men's swimming and diving	1	53
Women's swimming and diving	4	81
Men's tennis	11	71
Women's tennis	8	62
Volleyball	2	n/a
Wrestling	0	28

== Olympic medalists ==
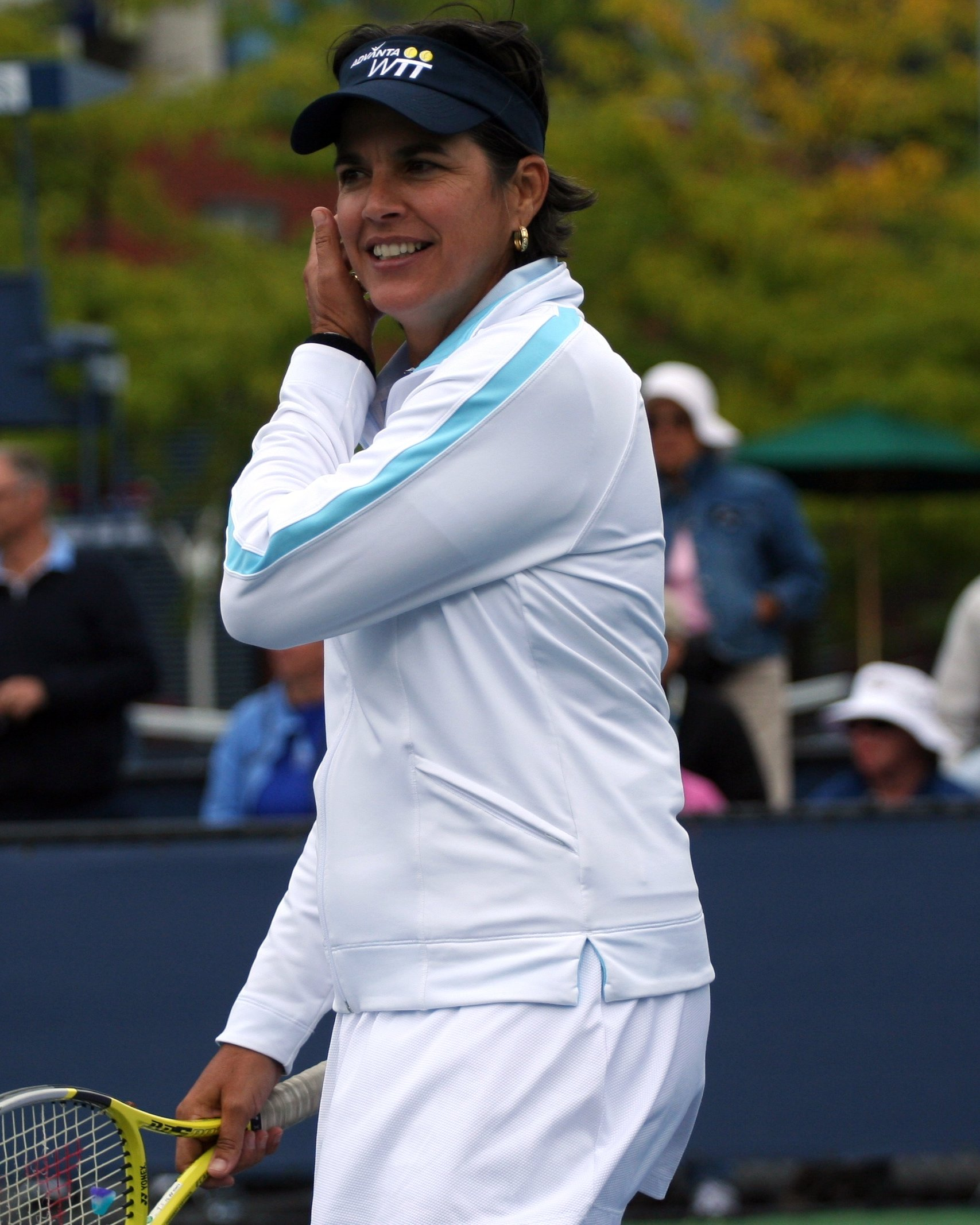
Gigi Fernández

Baseball

- Mike Milchin (1988, United States, pitcher, gold)
- Kris Benson (1996, United States, pitcher, bronze)
- Billy Koch (1996, United States, pitcher, bronze)
- Matthew LeCroy (1996, United States, catcher, bronze)

Swimming

- Michelle Richardson (1984, United States, 800 free, silver)
- Mitzi Kremer (1988, United States, 400 free relay, bronze)

Tennis

- Gigi Fernández (1992 and 1996, United States, doubles, gold)

Track & field

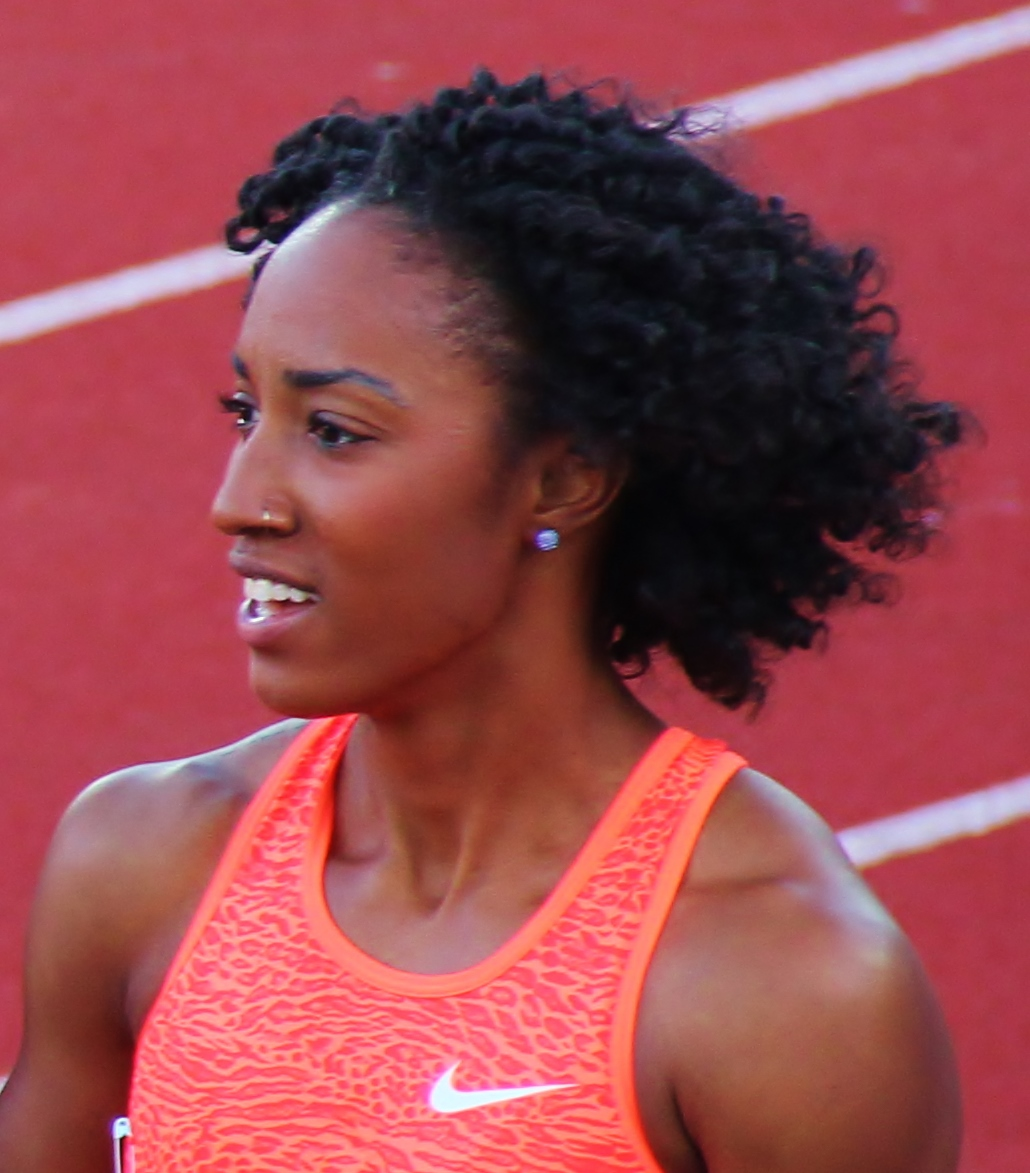
Brianna Rollins

- Desai Williams (1984, Canada, 4 × 100 relay, bronze)
- Tony Sharpe (1984, Canada, 4 × 100 relay, bronze)
- Mark McKoy (1992, Canada, 110 hurdles, gold)
- Kim Graham (1996, United States, 4 × 400 relay, gold)
- Carlton Chambers (1996, Canada, 4 × 100 relay, gold)
- Shawn Crawford (2004 and 2008, United States, 200m gold and 4 × 100 relay silver (2004), 200m silver (2008))
- Michelle Burgher (2004, Jamaica, 4 × 400 relay, bronze)
- Brianna Rollins (2016, United States, 100m hurdles, gold)
- Kendra Harrison (2020, United States, 100m, silver) (Note: Harrison started her collegiate career at Clemson before transferring to Kentucky.)
- Patrícia Mamona (2020, Portugal, triple jump, silver)
- Rojé Stona (2024, Jamaica, discus, gold) (Note: Stona started his collegiate career at Clemson before transferring to Arkansas.)

Wrestling

- Noel Loban (1984, Great Britain, bronze)
- Sammie Henson (2000, United States, silver)

== Rivalries ==
Clemson's primary rivalry is with the University of South Carolina. The rivalry dates back to the first football game between the schools in 1896.

Clemson's intra-conference football rivalries include Georgia Tech (GT leads 51–36–2), NC State (Clemson leads 61–30–1 in the Textile Bowl), Boston College (O'Rourke–McFadden Trophy, Clemson leads 22–9–2), and Florida State (FSU leads 21–17).

Clemson has a lesser rivalry with the University of Georgia, born because of the two institutions' close proximity (roughly 75 miles apart). Clemson and Georgia first met in 1897, only the second year the Tigers fielded a football team. The rivalry was at its height in the 1980s. Georgia leads the football series 44–18–4.

== Facilities ==
- Doug Kingsmore Stadium – baseball
- Duckworth Family Tennis Facility
- Frank Howard Field at Memorial Stadium – football
  - Reeves Football Complex (practice facility)
- Jervey Gym – volleyball, strength & conditioning
- Littlejohn Coliseum – basketball, gymnastics
- McWhorter Stadium – softball
- Riggs Field – soccer
- Rock Norman Track & Field Complex
- Walker Golf Course
- Women's Athletics Facility – lacrosse, rowing, gymnastics (practice facilities)
  - Conklin Field – lacrosse

The most prominent of Clemson's facilities is Memorial Stadium, Frank Howard Field, home to the Clemson University varsity football team. Memorial Stadium is also known by its nickname, "Death Valley." Memorial Stadium is also home to the WestZone, which was completed in 2006. With the completion of the first phase of the WestZone, the listed capacity for Memorial Stadium is 81,500. The WestZone holds many IPTAY offices, Clemson football coach's offices, weight rooms, locker rooms, and a recruiting center.

Littlejohn Coliseum, which has a listed capacity of 9,000 spectators, is home to both of Clemson's basketball teams and the gymnastics program. Littlejohn also acts as a venue for a variety of campus functions throughout the year, including concerts and graduation ceremonies.

Recently renovated Doug Kingsmore Stadium is home to Clemson's men's baseball team.

McWhorter Stadium is home to Clemson's varsity softball team.

The men's and women's soccer teams play their home games at historic Riggs Field.

Other home venues for these sports are: Walker Golf Course, Hoke Sloan Tennis Center, Jervey Gym (volleyball), Conklin Field (lacrosse), Rock Norman Track Complex, and McHugh Natatorium. Women's rowing holds home events on nearby Lake Hartwell.

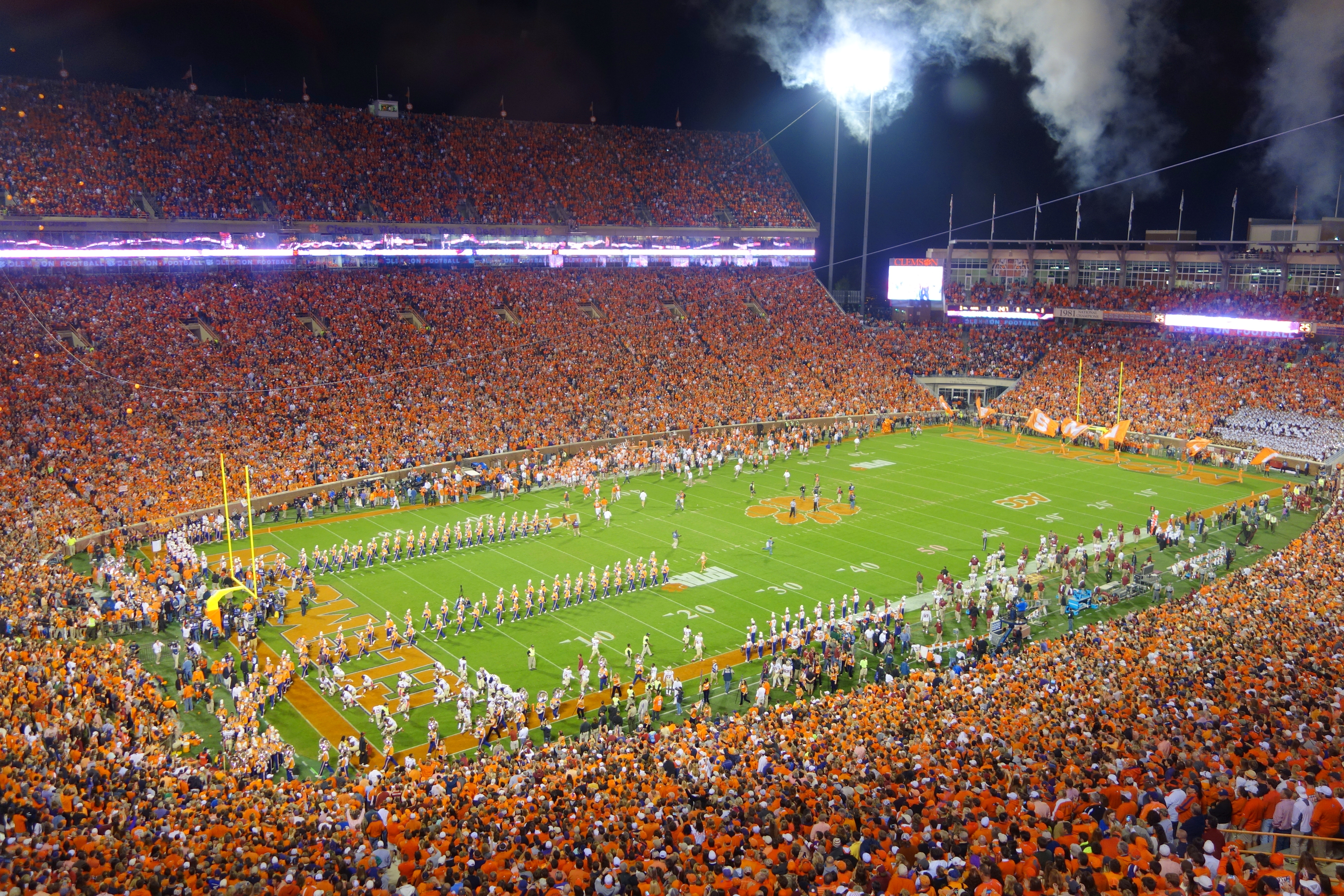
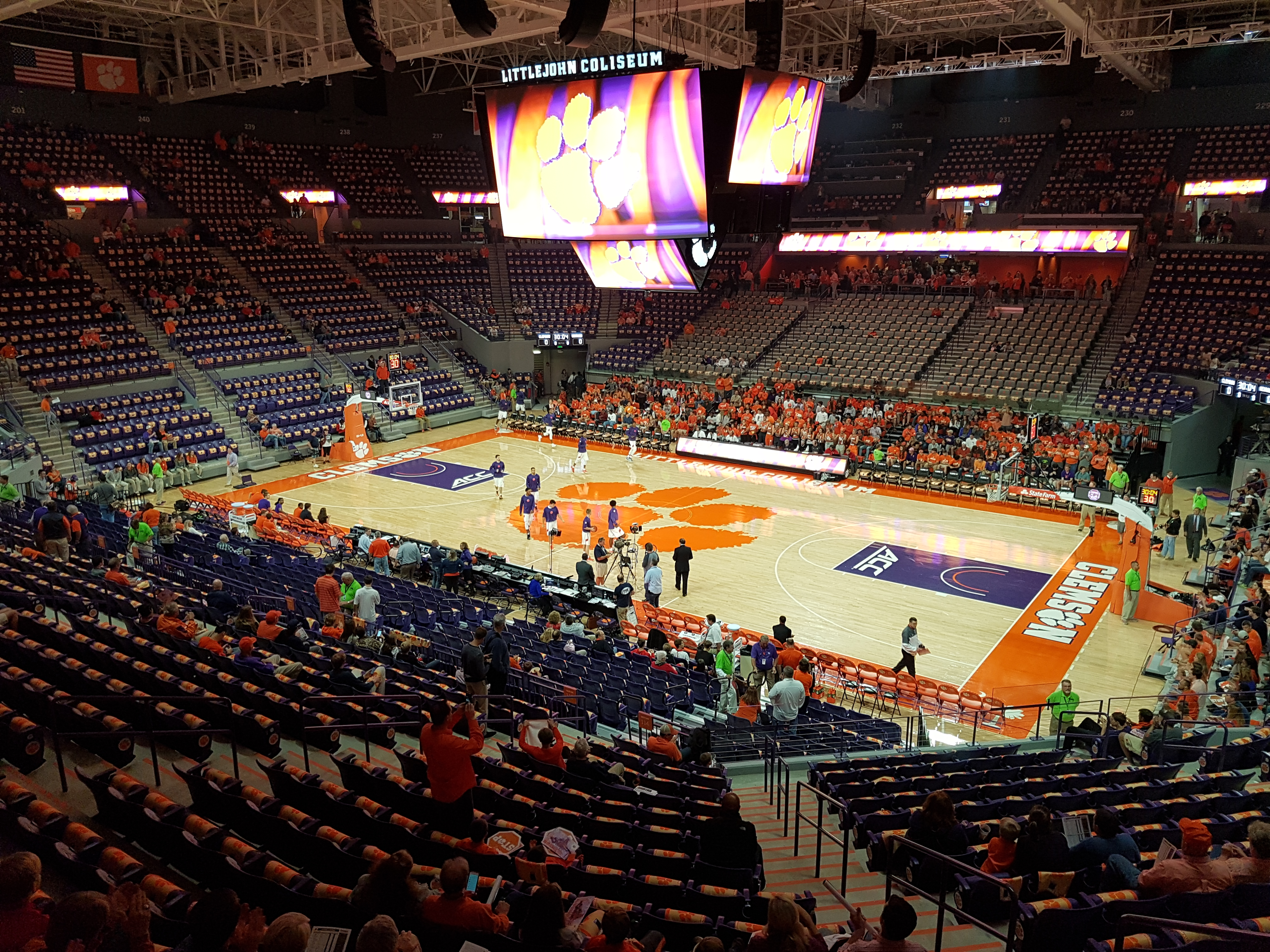
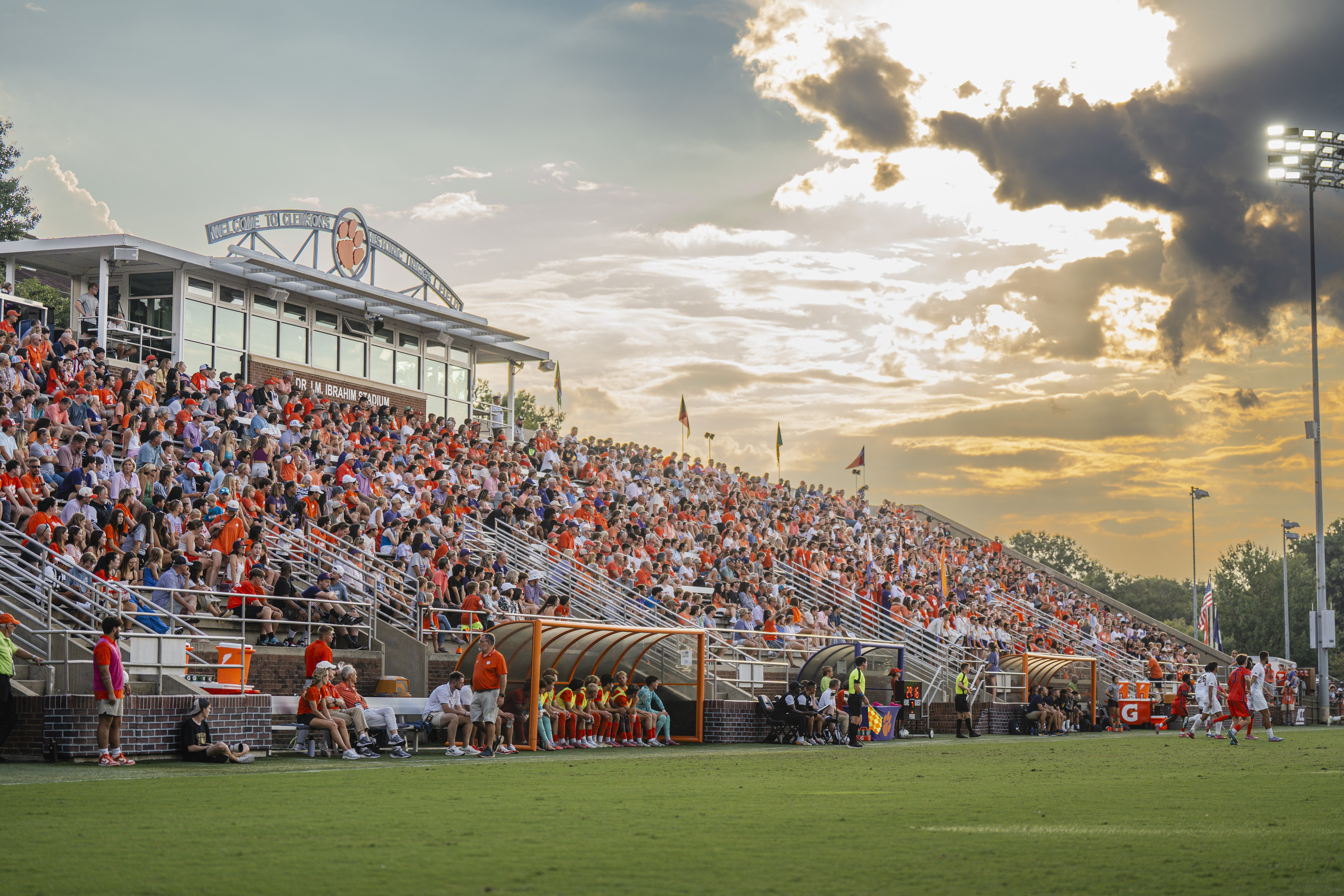
Memorial Stadium, Littlejohn Coliseum, Riggs Field

== Notable non-varsity sports ==
Clemson has 33 student-led club sports supported by the department of campus recreation.

=== Rugby ===
Clemson Rugby was founded in 1967. Although rugby is a club sport at Clemson, the team receives significant support from the university and from the Clemson Rugby Foundation, which was founded in 2007 by Clemson alumni. Clemson rugby has been led since 2010 by head coach Justin Hickey, who has also served as team manager for the U.S. national under-20 team.

Clemson's best season was 1996, when the team advanced to the national college rugby quarterfinals. Clemson also advanced to the round of 16 of the national playoffs for three consecutive years from 2005 to 2007. Clemson has played since 2011 in the Atlantic Coast Rugby League against its traditional ACC rivals. Clemson placed second in its conference in the spring 2012 season with a 6-1 conference record, narrowly missing out to Maryland for the conference title and a place in the national college rugby playoffs. Clemson again finished the spring 2013 season with a 6-1 conference record, and then defeated South Carolina 29–7 in the round of 16 national playoffs, before losing in the quarterfinals to Central Florida 20–24.
