= Bill McLellan =

American college athletics administrator (1932–2013)

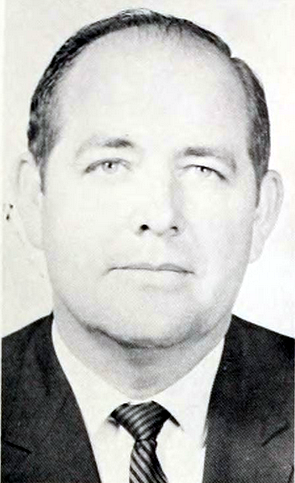
- McLellan in 1968

Biographical details
- Born: May 26, 1932; Hamer, South Carolina, U. S.
- Died: September 30, 2013 (aged 81); Greenville, South Carolina, U. S.

Playing career
- 1952–1954: Clemson

Coaching career (HC unless noted)
- 1966–1969: Clemson (Freshmen)

Administrative career (AD unless noted)
- 1958–1966: Clemson (Business Manager)
- 1966–1971: Clemson (Assistant AD)
- 1971–1985: Clemson
- 1986–1999: Southern Miss

Henslee Clifford "Bill" McLellan (May 26, 1932 – September 30, 2013) was an American college athletics administrator.

== Early life and career ==
McLellan was born in Hamer, South Carolina, and graduated from Dillon High School. He attended Clemson University, where he played on the football and baseball teams. McLellan graduated in 1954 with a BS degree in agronomy, and earned a MS in agricultural economics in 1956. He then joined Clemson's Department of Agricultural Economics and Seed Certification, before moving to the athletic department staff in 1958.

== Athletic administration ==
=== Clemson ===
McLellan was assistant business manager of athletics from 1958 to 1966, when he was named assistant athletic director to Frank Howard. When Howard stepped down in 1971, McLellan was named athletic director. Under McLellan, Clemson introduced women's sports in 1975, and saw rapid expansion of facilities. McLellan was responsible for the construction of athletic offices and training facilities (today known as the Jervey Athletic Center), as well as Memorial Stadium's upper decks in 1978 and 1982.

McLellan's tenure was marred by recruiting violations in basketball in 1975, and football in 1982. In both instances, McLellan performed only cursory internal investigations before penalties were handed down by the National Collegiate Athletic Association. A steroid scandal in 1984–85 led to the ouster of university president Bill Lee Atchley, while McLellan was placed on a leave of absence. McLellan was briefly reassigned to work on facilities planning before resigning from the university in August 1985.

=== Southern Miss ===
After a brief stint at Eastern Foods (owned by Clemson alumnus Robert H. Brooks), McLellan was hired as athletic director at the University of Southern Mississippi in 1986. He oversaw an expansion in the school's athletic budget, renovations to M. M. Roberts Stadium and Pete Taylor Park, and led the move from the Metro Conference to the newly-formed Conference USA in 1996.

== Honors and awards ==
McLellan was awarded the Clemson Distinguished Service Award in 1982, and inducted into the Clemson Athletic Hall of Fame in 1993, the Southern Mississippi Athletic Hall of Fame in 2001, and the South Carolina Athletic Hall of Fame in 2013.
