= Dan Radakovich =

American football player and coach, college administrator (born 1958)

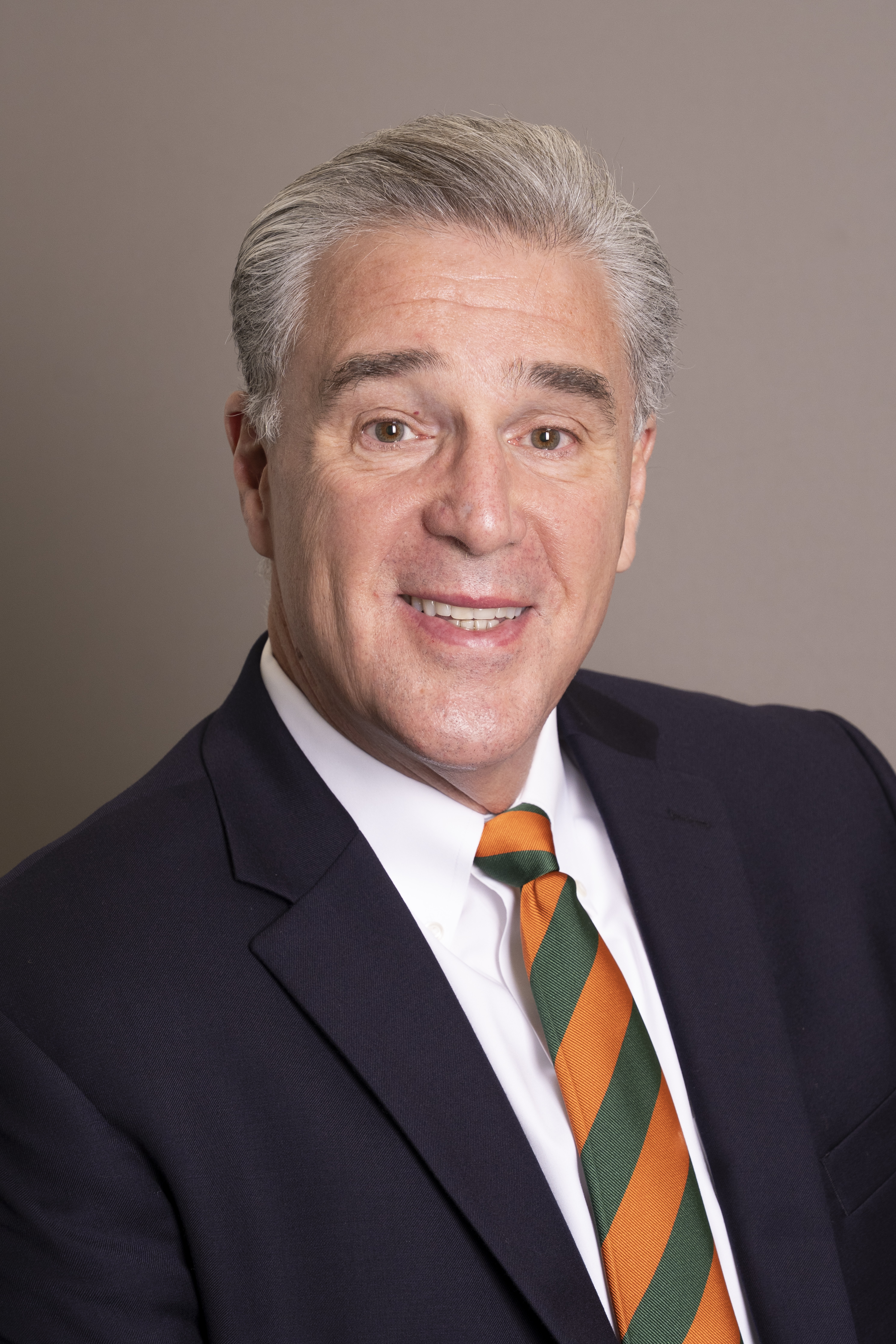
- Radakovich in 2026

Current position
- Title: Athletic director
- Team: Miami (FL)
- Conference: ACC

Biographical details
- Born: June 9, 1958 (age 68); Aliquippa, Pennsylvania, U.S.
- Education: Indiana University of PA (B.S.); University of Miami (MBA)

Playing career
- 1977–1980: IUP
- Positions: Tight end, punter

Administrative career (AD unless noted)
- 1983–1985: Miami (FL) (athletic business manager)
- 1989–1993: Long Beach State (associate AD)
- 1994–1999: South Carolina (associate AD)
- 2000: American
- 2001–2005: LSU (senior associate AD)
- 2006–2011: Georgia Tech
- 2012–2020: Clemson
- 2021–Present: Miami (FL)

Dan Radakovich (born June 9, 1958) is the athletic director of the University of Miami in Coral Gables, Florida.

Prior to his appointment at the University of Miami, Radakovich previously served as the athletic director at American University from 2000 to 2001, Georgia Tech from 2006 to 2012, and Clemson University from 2012 to 2021. The Clemson Tigers football program won a pair of national titles during his tenure. From 2001 to 2006, Radakovich was the senior associate director of athletics at LSU.

== Early life and education ==
Radakovich was born June 9, 1958, in Aliquippa, Pennsylvania. He is of Serbian American descent. He grew up in Monaca, Pennsylvania, where he attended Center High School just outside Aliquippa.

In 1980, Radakovich was a distinguished graduate from the Indiana University of Pennsylvania in Indiana, Pennsylvania, where he earned a bachelor's degree in finance. In 1982, he graduated from the University of Miami Business School with an MBA.

== Career ==
=== Early career ===
At California State University, Long Beach, he revamped radio broadcast agreements.

At the University of South Carolina, he managed $33 million in facility improvements, including the Colonial Life Arena, now the home of USC's basketball teams as well as other sports.

At American University, he worked to get the school into the Patriot League. He hired top-level executive staff, including JC Whipple to fill the role of Asst. AD for Communications.

At LSU, he developed a football ticket donation program and was involved in $90 million renovation of Tiger Stadium.

=== Georgia Tech ===
When hired at Georgia Tech on February 22, 2006, Radakovich beat out former Tech player and head coach Bill Curry and former Tech baseball and football player and baseball assistant coach Cam Bonifay for the job. Radakovich improved the sales of season tickets for the 2006 football season, especially "chairback" or "club level" season tickets; hired football head coach Paul Johnson. He changed the way that athletic seating worked with the TECH Fund. The program also had several facilities changes, including a new indoor practice facility for football, Alexander Memorial Coliseum redesigned as Hank McCamish Pavilion, and rebuilt tennis facilities. He is blamed for leaving the school saddled with the stigma of being the sole major program wearing Russell Athletic uniforms until 2018. The original contract was for 10 years, beginning in July 2008. Then-AD Radakovich had the option to cancel the final 5 years of the partnership prior to August 1, 2012.

=== Clemson University ===
On October 29, 2012, Radakovich accepted the position of athletic director at Clemson University. Since taking over as athletic director, Radakovich has helped complete more than $180 million in facility enhancements, headlined by a rebuilt Littlejohn Coliseum, the Reeves Football Operations Complex, Duckworth Family Tennis Center, baseball operations facility and the new softball stadium, set to open in 2020.

The Reeves complex opened in Feb. 2017, just weeks after winning the 2016 College Football Playoff National Championship. Radakovich has overseen Clemson's rise to a national football power, led by head coach Dabo Swinney. Swinney's football program claimed both the 2016 and 2018 College Football National Championship. Radakovich also helped complete several premium seating projects in several facilities. Clemson's athletic department has set records in Academic Progress Rate, Graduation Success Rate, and numerous other academic measures.

Department revenue nearly doubled from $69 million in FY14 to more than $120 million in 2019. Clemson also agreed a new 10-year, $58 million partnership with Nike that spans all sports.

Radakovich was named Sports Business Daily's Athletic Director of the Year in 2017 at the Sports Business Awards.

Radakovich was a member of the College Football Playoff Selection Committee from 2014 to 2017. In April 2019, he signed an extension to continue in this role until 2024.

=== University of Miami ===
In December 2021, Radakovich joined the University of Miami as athletic director for the Miami Hurricanes.

His tenure at Miami includes the football team's run to the College Football Playoff Championship Game this past season; the men's basketball program's first ever Final Four appearance in 2023; the women's program first ever Elite Eight appearance in 2023; six individual NCAA champions; and a school record Graduation Success Rate of 94 percent in the NCAA's most recent report. In 2026, Radakovich was named one of four NACDA Athletic Directors of the Year for FBS.
