= Terry Don Phillips =

American college athletics administrator (1947–2026)

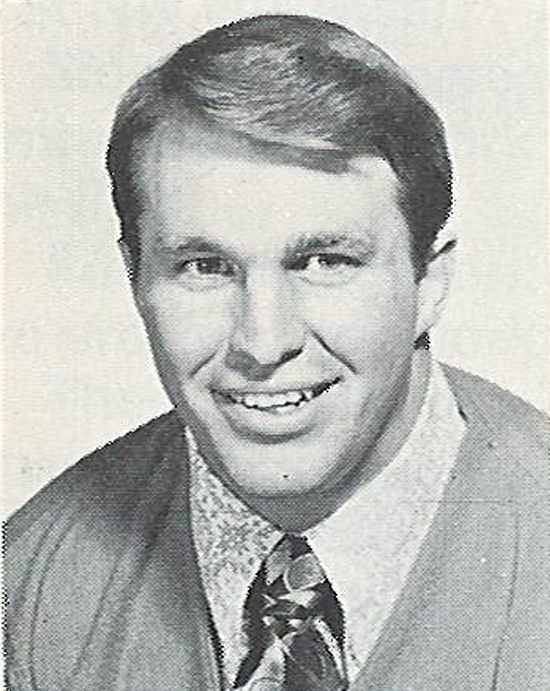
- Phillips in 1972

Biographical details
- Born: August 29, 1947; Longview, Texas, U.S.
- Died: May 26, 2026 (aged 78); Clemson, South Carolina, U.S.

Playing career
- 1966–1969: Arkansas
- Position: Defensive tackle

Coaching career (HC unless noted)
- 1970–1971: Arkansas (GA)
- 1971–1978: Virginia Tech (assistant)
- 1979: Florida (admin. assistant)

Administrative career (AD unless noted)
- 1980–1981: Liberty
- 1981–1983: Missouri (asst. AD)
- 1983–1988: Southwestern Louisiana
- 1988–1994: Arkansas (sr. assoc. AD)
- 1995–2002: Oklahoma State
- 2002–2012: Clemson

Terry Don Phillips (August 29, 1947 – May 26, 2026) was an American college athletics administrator. He served as the athletic director at Liberty Baptist College—now known as Liberty University—from 1980 to 1981, at the University of Southwestern Louisiana—now known as the University of Louisiana at Lafayette—from 1983 to 1988, at Oklahoma State University from 1995 to 2002, and at Clemson University from 2002 to 2012.

== Playing and coaching career ==
Phillips played defensive tackle at Arkansas from 1966 to 1969. His older brother, Loyd Phillips, was an All-American defensive lineman for Arkansas between 1964 and 1966, and won the 1966 Outland Trophy.

He remained at Arkansas as a graduate assistant for the 1970 and 1971 seasons, before moving to Virginia Tech as an assistant coach. Phillips left Virginia Tech after 1978. He then joined the Florida Gators coaching staff as an administrative assistant to head coach Charley Pell.

== Administrative career ==
In 1980, Phillips became athletic director at Liberty University. He then served as the assistant athletic director at the University of Missouri. He moved to Louisiana–Lafayette in 1983, before returning to his alma mater, Arkansas, in 1988 as Senior Associate Athletic Director.

Phillips stayed at Arkansas until 1994, and then left for the AD job at Oklahoma State once it became apparent that then-Arkansas AD Frank Broyles had no intention of retiring. Under Phillips, the Cowboys basketball team continued their success under coach Eddie Sutton, reaching the NCAA Final Four in 1995 and the Elite Eight in 2000. In football, Phillips hired coach Les Miles in 2001, who would turn the program around and lead the team to 3 straight bowl bids after Phillips left the school.

In 2002 Phillips left Oklahoma State for Clemson. There, he has overseen the hiring of basketball coaches Oliver Purnell in 2003 and Brad Brownell in 2010. He also promoted Dabo Swinney to head football coach and oversaw the "WestZone" expansion of Memorial Stadium in 2006.

He was inducted into the University of Arkansas Sports Hall of Honor in 2010.

== Retirement and death ==
Phillips retired from Clemson University in 2012. He died in Clemson on May 26, 2026, aged 78.
