= John Antonio =

American advertising executive

John George Antonio (c. 1930 – May 23, 2013) was an American advertising executive who is best known as the designer of Clemson University's Tiger paw logo. The iconic Clemson sports logo, which Antonio developed at Henderson Advertising in Greenville, South Carolina, was unveiled on July 21, 1970.

Antonio worked for the Leo Burnett ad agency in Chicago, Illinois, during the 1960s. According to a 1997 interview he gave to The Greenville News, Antonio worked on Leo Burnett agency teams that created the Morton Salt girl, the Pillsbury Doughboy, and the "Fly the friendly skies of United" ad campaign for United Airlines.

In 1970, Hootie Ingram was hired as the new head coach of the Clemson Tigers football team for the forthcoming Fall season, replacing longtime coach Frank Howard, who retired in 1969. As part of the transition from Howard to Ingram, Clemson University President R.C. Edwards hired Henderson Advertising of Greenville to rebrand the university and its athletic teams.

Antonio, an employee of Henderson, was tasked with creating a new logo and mascot. Antonio would create the iconic Tiger paw logo. He modeled the new paw logo on a plaster cast of a real Bengal tiger paw, which had been sent from the Field Museum of Natural History in Chicago at Antonio's request.

Antonio created the tiger paw logo during Spring 1970. Clemson University unveiled Antonio's creation at a series of press conferences held in South Carolina, Charlotte, North Carolina, and Atlanta, Georgia.

John Antonio died on May 23, 2013, of cancer at his home in Greenville, South Carolina, at the age of 83.
