= NCAA Division I men's soccer tournament all-time individual records =

The following is a list of National Collegiate Athletic Association (NCAA) Division I college soccer individual statistics and records through the NCAA Division I Men's Soccer Championship as of 2025.

== Tournament Scoring and Assist Leaders ==
Year	Player	Team	Goals	Assists	Points
1974	(Bermuda) Dale Russell	Philadelphia	6	1	13
1975	(United States) Lincoln Peddie	Howard	6	0	12
1976	(United States) Dave MacWilliams	Philadelphia	5	2	12
1977	(United States) Art Napolitano	Hartwick College	4	0	8
1978	(Nigeria) Thompson Usiyan	Appalachian State	7	1	15
1979	(Nigeria) Obed Ariri	Clemson	5	1	11
1980	(United States) John Hayes	Saint Louis	5	0	10
1981	(England) Elvis Comrie	Connecticut	3	2	8
1981	(Cape Verde) Pedro DeBrito	Connecticut	3	2	8
1981	(Ethiopia) Solomon Shiferow	Alabama A&M	3	2	8
1982	(United States) Sean McCoy	Duke	3	1	7
1983	(United States) Jeff Gafney	Virginia	4	1	9
1984	(United States) Gary Conner	Clemson	4	0	8
1984	(United States) Mike Hylla	Indiana	3	2	8
1985	(United States) Dale Ervine	UCLA	4	0	8
1986	(United States) Tom Stone	Duke	4	1	9
1987	(United States) Bruce Murray	Clemson	5	4	14
1988	(United States) Michael Dominic	LIU–Brooklyn	3	0	6
1988	(Republic of Ireland) Ian Hennessy	Seton Hall	3	0	6
1989	(United States) Steve Snow	Indiana	4	1	9
1990	(United States) Chad Deering	Indiana	3	1	7
1991	(United States) Brian McBride	Saint Louis	4	0	8
1991	(United States) Alan Prampin	SMU	3	2	8
1991	(United States) Bill Donnell	Yale	4	0	8
1992	(United States) Guillermo Jara	San Diego	3	5	11
1993	(United States) Nate Friends	Virginia	5	0	10
1993	(United States) Andre Parris	Princeton	2	6	10
1994	(United States) AJ Wood	Virginia	5	0	10
1995	(United States) Mike Fisher	Virginia	5	0	10
1996	(Serbia) Alen Kozic	Florida International	3	3	9
1997	(United States) Ben Olsen	Virginia	5	3	13
1998	(Ukraine) Aleksey Korol	Indiana	6	2	14
1999	(Ukraine) Aleksey Korol	Indiana (2)	4	2	10
2000	(Egypt) Mohamed Fahim	SMU	5	2	12
2000	(United States) Corey Woolfolk	Stanford	5	2	12
2001	(United States) Ryan Kneipper	North Carolina	5	0	10
2002	(United States) Matt Taylor	UCLA	5	2	12
2003	(Zimbabwe) Joseph Ngwenya	Coastal Carolina	5	1	11
2004	(United States) Ryan Pore	Tulsa	4	1	9
2005	(Brazil) Paulo da Silva	SMU	5	2	12
2006	(United States) Sal Zizzo	UCLA	5	1	11
2007	(England) Yan Klukowski	Central Connecticut State	3	3	9
2008	(United States) Cody Arnoux	Wake Forest	3	3	9
2009	(United States) Will Bates	Virginia	4	0	8
2009	(United States) Zack Schilawski	Wake Forest	3	2	8
2009	(Cameroon) Tony Tchani	Virginia	2	4	8
2010	(Iraq) Justin Meram	Michigan	5	0	10
2011	(United States) Casey Townsend	Maryland	4	0	8
2011	(United States) Colin Rolfe	Louisville	2	4	8
2011	(United States) Chandler Hoffman	UCLA	3	2	8
2012	(United States) Nikita Kotlov	Indiana	5	1	11
2013	(United States) Patrick Mullins	Maryland	5	1	11
2014	(United States) Andy Craven	North Carolina	4	2	10
2015	(United States) Jordan Morris	Stanford	5	1	11
2016	(United States) Julian Gressel	Providence	4	1	9
2017	(United States) Mike Catalano	Wisconsin	4	0	8
2018	(Canada) Marcel Zajac	Akron	6	1	13
2019	(United States) Jacob Montes	Georgetown	3	3	9
2020	(United States) Veljko Petković	Pittsburgh	3	2	8
2021	(United States) Dylan Teves	Washington	6	1	13
2022	(United States) Duncan McGuire	Creighton	4	2	10
2023	(United States) Logan Farrington	Oregon State	4	3	11
2024	(Israel) Yaniv Bazini	Vermont	6	0	12
2025	(England) Laurie Goddard	Hofstra	4	2	10

== Individual Records ==
- Most Goals, Single Game: 7
  - Thompson Usiyan, Appalachian State (1978; vs. George Washington)
- Most Goals, Tournament: 7
  - Thompson Usiyan, Appalachian State (1978; vs. George Washington–7 and Clemson–0)
- Most Goals, Career: 13
  - AJ Wood, Virginia (1991–1994)
- Most Assists, Game: 3
  - Hugh Copeland, Brown (1976, vs. Bridgeport)
  - Dale Russell, Philadelphia U. (1976, vs. Penn State)
  - Duncan MacDonald, Hartwick College (1976, St. Francis, NY)
  - Robert Byrkett, Appalachian State (1977, vs. George Washington)
  - Tim Guelker, SIU Edwardsville (1978, vs. Clemson)
  - Peter Dicce, Temple (1979, vs. Penn State)
  - David Borum, Houston Cougars (1979, vs. Houston Cougars Intramural Team)
  - Dario Brose, NC State (1985, vs. South Carolina)
  - Toby Taitano, San Diego (1990, vs. Portland)
  - Billy Baumhof, South Carolina (1990, vs. Air Force)
  - Andre Parris, Princeton (1993, vs. Penn State)
  - Daniel Falcone, Portland (1995, vs. Butler)
  - Yuri Lavrinenko, Indiana (1995, vs. Evansville)
  - Matt Crawford, North Carolina (2002, vs. Winthrop)
  - Simon Schoendorf, South Florida (2005, vs. Stetson)
  - Cody Arnoux, Wake Forest (2008, vs. South Florida)
  - Colin Rolfe, Louisville (2011, vs. Maryland)
  - Dan Delgado, San Diego (2012, vs. UCLA)
  - Ivan Militar, Old Dominion (2013, vs. Drexel)
  - Leo Stolz, UCLA (2013, vs. Elon)
  - Fabian Herbers, Creighton (2015, vs. Drake)
  - Iman Mafi, Clemson (2015, vs. Elon)
  - Thales Moreno, Clemson (2015, vs. UC Santa Barbara)
  - Nico Melo, North Carolina (2016, vs. Florida Gulf Coast)
  - Ken Krolicki, Michigan (2017, vs. Virginia Tech)
  - Trevor Swartz, Indiana (2018, vs. UConn)
- Most Assists, Tournament: 6
  - Andre Parris, Princeton (1993; vs. Columbia–1, Penn State–3, and Hartwick–2)
  - Trevor Swartz, Indiana (2018; vs. UConn–3, Air Force–2, and Notre Dame–1)
- Most Assists, Career: 11
  - Yuri Lavrinenko, Indiana (1996–1999)
- Most Points, Game: 15
  - Thompson Usiyan, Appalachian State–7 goals, 1 assist (1978; vs. George Washington)
- Most Points, Tournament: 15
  - Thompson Usiyan, Appalachian State–7 goals, 1 assist (1978; vs. George Washington–7 goals, 1 assist and vs. Clemson–0 goals, 0 assists)
- Most Points, Career: 29
  - Dave MacWilliams, Philadelphia U.–11 goals, 7 assists (1976–1978)
  - AJ Wood, Virginia–13 goals, 3 assists (1991–1994)
  - Aleksey Korol, Indiana–12 goals, 5 assists (1996–1999)
- Most Saves, Game: 28
  - Frank Crupi, Farleigh Dickinson (1975; vs. Bucknell)
- Lowest Goals-against Average, Tournament (Minimum 3 games): 0.00
  - Peter Arnautoff, San Francisco (1976; vs. San Jose State, Clemson, and Indiana)
  - Jon Belskis, Wisconsin (1995; vs. William & Mary, SMU, Portland, and Duke)
  - Aaron Sockwell, SMU (1997; vs. Rider, Dartmouth, and Saint Louis)
  - David Meves, Akron (2009; vs. South Florida, Stanford, Tulsa, North Carolina, and Virginia)
  - Andrew Epstein, Stanford (2016; vs. Pacific, Virginia, Louisville, North Carolina and Wake Forest)
  - Nico Corti, Stanford (2017; vs. Pacific, Coastal Carolina, Wake Forest, Akron and Indiana)
  - Dayne St. Clair, Maryland (2018; vs. NC State, Duke, Kentucky, Indiana and Akron)
- Lowest Goals-against Average, Career (Minimum 5 games): 0.00
  - Nico Corti, Stanford–0 goals, 6 games, 488 minutes (2015–2017)

== All-Tournament Teams ==
Year	Most Outstanding Offensive Player	Most Outstanding Defensive Player	All Tournament-Team
1960	Don Range, Saint Louis	John A. Klein, Saint Louis	none
1961	Bill Foulke, West Chester	Bill Killen, West Chester	none
1962	Gerry Balassi, Saint Louis	Don Ceresia, Saint Louis	none
1963	none awarded		
1964	Sydney Alozie, Michigan State	Myron Hura, Navy	none
1965	Pat McBride, Saint Louis	Jack Gilsinn, Saint Louis (Soviet Union) Nick Krat, Michigan State	none
1966	Sandor Hites, San Francisco	none	none
1967	Ernie Tuchscherer, Michigan State	none	none
1968	none awarded		
1969	Al Trost, Saint Louis	Pat Leahy, Saint Louis	none
1970	none awarded		
1971	Mike Seerey, Saint Louis	none	none
1972	Danny Counce, Saint Louis	Bruce Arena, Cornell	none
1973	none awarded		
1974	none awarded		
1975	Andy Atuegbu, San Francisco	(Socialist Federal Republic of Yugoslavia) Steve Ralbovsky, Brown	none
1976	Andy Atuegbu, San Francisco (2)	Dave Shelton, Indiana	none
1977	(Scotland) John Young, Hartwick College	Jeff Tipping, Hartwick College	none
none awarded from 1978 to 1996
1997	Seth George, UCLA	Matt Reis, UCLA	Seth George, UCLA; Matt Reis, UCLA; Carlos Bocanegra, UCLA; Josh Keller, UCLA; Tom Poltl, UCLA; McKinley Tennyson, UCLA; Ben Olsen, Virginia; Scott Vermillion, Virginia; Brian West, Virginia; Chris Klei, Indiana (Ukraine) Aleksey Korol, Indiana; Tim Leonard, Saint Louis; Kevin Quigley, Saint Louis
1998	(Ukraine) Aleksey Korol, Indiana	Nick Garcia, Indiana	(Ukraine) Aleksey Korol, Indiana; Nick Garcia, Indiana; Lazo Alavanja, Indiana; Gino DiGuardi, Indiana (Ukraine) Dema Kovalenko, Indiana (Ukraine) Yuri Lavrinenko, Indiana; Andrew Parrish, Indiana (Scotland) Jamie Clark, Stanford (New Zealand) Simon Elliott, Stanford; Lee Morrison, Stanford; Steve Armas, Maryland; Taylor Twellman, Maryland; Michael Goehring, Santa Clara
1999	(Ukraine) Yuri Lavrinenko, Indiana	Nick Garcia, Indiana (2)	(Ukraine) Yuri Lavrinenko, Indiana; Nick Garcia, Indiana; Ryan Mack, Indiana (Ukraine) Aleksey Korol, Indiana; Adam Eyre, Santa Clara; Ari Rodopoulos, Santa Clara; Shawn Percell, Santa Clara (Trinidad and Tobago) Darin Lewis, Connecticut (Trinidad and Tobago) Brent Rahim, Connecticut; Sasha Victorine, UCLA; Pete Vagenas, UCLA
2000	(Trinidad and Tobago) Darin Lewis, Connecticut	(Liberia) Chris Gbandi, Connecticut	(Trinidad and Tobago) Darin Lewis, Connecticut (Liberia) Chris Gbandi, Connecticut (Trinidad and Tobago) Brent Rahim, Connecticut; Bryheem Hancock, Connecticut; Max Zieky, Connecticut; Mike Tranchilla, Creighton; Brian Mullan, Creighton; Ishmael Mintah, Creighton; Mike Gabb, Creighton (Brazil) Diego Walsh, SMU; Pat Noonan, Indiana
2001	Ryan Kneipper, North Carolina	David Stokes, North Carolina	Ryan Kneipper, North Carolina; David Stokes, North Carolina (England) Danny Jackson, North Carolina; Matt Crawford, North Carolina; Michael Ueltschey, North Carolina; Pat Noonan, Indiana; Mike Ambersley, Indiana; Matt Moses, Stanford; Todd Dunivant, Stanford; Jeff Matteo, St. John's (NY) (Grenada) Shalrie Joseph, St. John's (NY)
2002	Aaron Lopez, UCLA	Zach Wells, UCLA	Aaron Lopez, UCLA; Zach Wells, UCLA; Joe Wieland, Creighton; Mike Tranchilla, Creighton (Ghana) Sumed Ibrahim, Maryland; Chad Marshall, Stanford; Roger Levesque, Stanford; Todd Dunivant, Stanford; Adolfo Gregorio, UCLA; Matt Taylor, UCLA; Scot Thompson, UCLA
2003	Jacob Peterson, Indiana	Jay Nolly, Indiana	Jacob Peterson, Indiana; Jay Nolly, Indiana Ned Grabavoy, Indiana; Jed Zayner, Indiana; Drew Shinabarger, Indiana; Josh Tudela, Indiana; Danny O'Rourke, Indiana; Christopher Wingert, St. John's (NY); Seth Stammler, Maryland (Ghana) Sumed Ibrahim, Maryland; Will Weatherly, Santa Clara
2004	Drew McAthy, UC Santa Barbara	Jay Nolly, Indiana (2)	Drew McAthy, UC Santa Barbara; Jay Nolly, Indiana; John Michael Hayden, Indiana; Jed Zayner, Indiana; Danny O'Rourke, Indiana; Brian Plotkin, Indiana (England) Andy Iro, UC Santa Barbara; Dan Kennedy, UC Santa Barbara (New Zealand) Tony Lochhead, UC Santa Barbara; Blake Camp, Duke; Jason Garey, Maryland
2005	Jason Garey, Maryland	Chris Seitz, Maryland	Jason Garey, Maryland; Chris Seitz, Maryland; Robbie Rogers, Maryland; A.J. Godbolt, Maryland; Michael Dello-Russo, Maryland (New Zealand) Andrew Boyens, New Mexico; Mike Graczyck, New Mexico; Lance Watson, New Mexico (Jamaica) Dane Richards, Clemson; Justin Moore, Clemson (Brazil) Paulo da Silva, SMU
2006	(Spain) Nick Perera, UC Santa Barbara	(England) Andy Iro, UC Santa Barbara	(Spain) Nick Perera, UC Santa Barbara (England) Andy Iro, UC Santa Barbara; Eric Avila, UC Santa Barbara (Republic of Ireland) Bryan Byrne, UC Santa Barbara; Kyle Reynish, UC Santa Barbara (Canada) Tyler Rosenlund, UC Santa Barbara; Tony Beltran, UCLA (Mexico) David Estrada, UCLA; Jason Leopoldo, UCLA (Mali) Bakary Soumare, Virginia; Marcus Tracy, Wake Forest
2007	Marcus Tracy, Wake Forest	none	Marcus Tracy, Wake Forest Brian Edwards, Wake Forest; Cody Arnoux, Wake Forest; Sam Cronin, Wake Forest; Zack Schilawski, Wake Forest; Eric Brunner, Ohio State (Honduras) Roger Espinoza, Ohio State; Casey Latchem, Ohio State; Doug Verhoff, Ohio State; Zack Simmons, Massachusetts (Ghana) Patrick Nyarko, Virginia Tech
2008	Graham Zusi, Maryland	Omar Gonzalez, Maryland	Graham Zusi, Maryland; Omar Gonzalez, Maryland; A. J. DeLaGarza, Maryland; Jason Herrick, Maryland; Rich Costanzo, Maryland; Neal Kitson, St. John's (NY); Corben Bone, Wake Forest; Zach Loyd, North Carolina; Brooks Haggerty, North Carolina; Brian Shriver, North Carolina; Billy Schuler, North Carolina
2009	Jonathan Villanueva, Virginia	(Venezuela) Diego Restrepo, Virginia	Jonathan Villanueva, Virginia (Venezuela) Diego Restrepo, Virginia; Brian Ownby, Virginia (Cameroon) Tony Tchani, Virginia; Mike Volk, Virginia (Canada) Teal Bunbury, Akron; Blair Gavin, Akron; Ben Speas, Akron; Zarek Valentin, Akron; Zach Loyd, North Carolina; Corben Bone, Wake Forest
2010	Scott Caldwell, Akron	Kofi Sarkodie, Akron	Scott Caldwell, Akron; Kofi Sarkodie, Akron; Zarek Valentin, Akron (Liberia) Darlington Nagbe, Akron; Michael Nanchoff, Akron; Anthony Ampaipitakwong, Akron; Charlie Campbell, Louisville; Colin Rolfe, Louisville; Austin Berry, Louisville; Andre Boudreaux, Louisville; Justin Meram, Michigan
2011	Ben Speas, North Carolina	Isaac Cowles, Charlotte	Ben Speas, North Carolina; Isaac Cowles, Charlotte; Billy Schuler, North Carolina; Enzo Martinez, North Carolina; Kirk Urso, North Carolina; Giuseppe Gentile, Charlotte; Charles Rodriguez, Charlotte; Donnie Smith, Charlotte; Chandler Hoffman, UCLA; Ryan Hollingshead, UCLA; Brian Holt, Creighton
2012	Steve Neumann, Georgetown	Luis Soffner, Indiana	Steve Neumann, Georgetown; Luis Soffner, Indiana; Nikita Kotlov, Indiana (Benin) Femi Hollinger-Janzen, Indiana; Caleb Konstanski, Indiana; Eriq Zavaleta, Indiana (Mexico) Tomas Gomez, Georgetown; Tommy Muller, Georgetown; Ian Christianson, Georgetown; Patrick Mullins, Maryland (Zimbabwe) Schillo Tshuma, Maryland
2013	Harry Shipp, Notre Dame	Zack Steffen, Maryland	Harry Shipp, Notre Dame; Zack Steffen, Maryland; Nick Besler, Notre Dame; Patrick Hodan, Notre Dame; Andrew O'Malley, Notre Dame; Grant Van De Casteele, Notre Dame (Japan) Tsubasa Endoh, Maryland; Patrick Mullins, Maryland; Jordan Allen, Virginia; Darius Madison, Virginia (Costa Rica) Michael Calderon, New Mexico
2014	Mac Steeves, Providence	Calle Brown, Virginia	Mac Steeves, Providence; Calle Brown, Virginia; Darius Madison, Virginia; Kyler Sullivan, Virginia; Sheldon Sullivan, Virginia (Guatemala) Pablo Aguilar, Virginia; Jake Rozhansky, Virginia (Germany) Leo Stolz, UCLA; Michael Amick, UCLA (Germany) Larry Ndjock, UCLA (Mali) Oumar Ballo, UMBC
2015	Jordan Morris, Stanford	Brandon Vincent, Stanford	Jordan Morris, Stanford; Brandon Vincent, Stanford; Jake Fenlason, Akron (Canada) Richie Laryea, Akron (Germany) Julian Büscher, Syracuse; Andrew Tarbell, Clemson; Kyle Fisher, Clemson (England) Paul Clowes, Clemson; Corey Baird, Stanford; Andrew Epstein, Stanford; Eric Verso, Stanford
2016	(England) Ian Harkes, Wake Forest	Andrew Epstein, Stanford	(England) Ian Harkes, Wake Forest; Andrew Epstein, Stanford (Brazil) Andre Shinyashiki, Denver; Colton Storm, North Carolina (Spain) Jon Bakero, Wake Forest; Brad Dunwell, Wake Forest (Ghana) Ema Twumasi, Wake Forest; Corey Baird, Stanford; Tanner Beason, Stanford; Tomas Hillard-Arce, Stanford; Brian Nana-Sinkam, Stanford
2017	Sam Werner, Stanford	Tomas Hilliard-Arce, Stanford	Sam Werner, Stanford; Tomas Hilliard-Arce, Stanford (Portugal) João Moutinho, Akron; Andrew Gutman, Indiana; Grant Lillard, Indiana; Trey Muse, Indiana; Cory Thomas, Indiana; Cam Lindley, North Carolina; Tanner Beason, Stanford; Nico Corti, Stanford; Foster Langsdorf, Stanford
2018	(Germany) Amar Sejdić, Maryland	(Germany) Ben Lundt, Akron	(Germany) Amar Sejdić, Maryland (Germany) Ben Lundt, Akron; Skye Harter, Akron (Kenya) Abdi Mohamed, Akron; Andrew Gutman, Indiana; Justin Rennicks, Indiana; Eli Crognale, Maryland; Ben Di Rosa, Maryland; Donovan Pines, Maryland (Canada) Dayne St. Clair, Maryland (Denmark) Patrick Nielsen, Michigan State
2019	Daryl Dike, Virginia	Dylan Nealis, Georgetown	Daryl Dike, Virginia; Dylan Nealis, Georgetown; Derek Dodson, Georgetown; Paul Rothrock, Georgetown; Daniel Wu, Georgetown; Sean Zawadzki, Georgetown (New Zealand) Joe Bell, Virginia; Henry Kessler, Virginia; Colin Shutler, Virginia (Scotland) Daniel Steedman, Virginia (Brazil) Bruno Lapa, Wake Forest
2020	(England) Jamil Roberts, Marshall	Roman Celentano, Indiana	(England) Jamil Roberts, Marshall; Roman Celentano, Indiana; Joey Maher, Indiana; Herbert Endeley, Indiana (Canada) Nathan Dossantos, Marshall (Brazil) Vinicius Fernandes, Marshall (Germany) Max Schneider, Marshall (Brazil) Vitor Dias, Marshall (England) Joe Pickering, North Carolina; Filip Mirkovic, Pittsburgh (Germany) Jasper Löffelsend, Pittsburgh
2021	Isaiah Reid, Clemson	George Marks, Clemson	Isaiah Reid, Clemson; George Marks, Clemson (Sweden) Oskar Ågren, Clemson (Ecuador) Luis Felipe Fernandez-Salvador, Clemson (Senegal) Justin Malou, Clemson; Zach Riviere, Georgetown; Jack Lynn, Notre Dame; Lucas Meek, Washington; Charlie Ostrem, Washington; Ryan Sailor, Washington; Dylan Teves, Washington
2022	(Ghana) Nathan Opoku, Syracuse	Russell Shealy, Syracuse	(Ghana) Nathan Opoku, Syracuse; Russell Shealy, Syracuse; Duncan McGuire, Creighton; JT Harms, Indiana; Daniel Munie, Indiana; Ryan Wittenbrink, Indiana; Filip Mirkovic, Pittsburgh; Curt Calov, Syracuse (Canada) Christian Curti, Syracuse (Canada) Levonte Johnson, Syracuse; Jeorgio Kocevski, Syracuse
2023	(Senegal) Ousmane Sylla, Clemson	(Senegal) Pape Mar Boye, Clemson	(Senegal) Ousmane Sylla, Clemson (Senegal) Pape Mar Boye, Clemson (Ghana) Joseph Andema, Clemson (Estonia) Alex Meinhard, Clemson; Brandon Parrish, Clemson; Shawn Smart, Clemson (Ghana) KK Baffour, Notre Dame; Bryan Dowd, Notre Dame (England) Eno Nto, Notre Dame (Spain) Arnau Farnós, Oregon State (Japan) Yutaro Tsukada, West Virginia
2024	Maximilian Kissel, Vermont	(Germany) Niklas Herceg, Vermont	Maximilian Kissel, Vermont (Germany) Niklas Herceg, Vermont (Hungary) Marcell Papp, Vermont; Zach Barrett, Vermont (Israel) Yaniv Bazini, Vermont (Japan) Taimu Okiyoshi, Marshall (Germany) Tarik Pannholzer, Marshall; Sam Bassett, Denver; Ben Smith, Denver; Luciano Pechota, Ohio State (Germany) Thomas Gilej, Ohio State
2025	Zach Ramsey, Washington	Jadon Bowton, Washington	Zach Ramsey, Washington; Jadon Bowton, Washington; Richie Aman, Washington; Asher Hestad, Washington; Charlie Kosakoff, Washington; Taig Healy, NC State (Saint Lucia) Donavan Phillip, NC State (Canada) Nikola Markovic, NC State; Braden Dunham, Furman; Luke Hutzel, Furman; Quinten Blair, Saint Louis
