= NCAA Division I Men's Soccer Tournament Most Outstanding Player =

At the conclusion of the NCAA Division I Men's Soccer Tournament (the "College Cup" tournaments), United Soccer Coaches selects two Most Outstanding Players: one for the Offensive Most Outstanding Player and the Defensive Most Outstanding Player. The MOP need not be, but is often a member of the Championship team.

== Past winners ==
An asterisk (*) next to a player's name indicates they did not play for the championship team.

=== NCAA Men's Division I Offensive MOP Award ===
- 1959 – John Dueker, Saint Louis
- 1960 – Gerry Balassi, Saint Louis
- 1961 – Bill Killen, West Chester
- 1962 – Bob Trigg, Saint Louis
- 1963 – Pat McBride, Saint Louis
- 1964 – Jimmy Lewis, Navy
- 1965 – Carl Gentile, Saint Louis
- 1966 – Sandor Hites, San Francisco
- 1967 – Wally Werner, Saint Louis
- 1968 – Rocco Morelli, Maryland
- 1969 – Al Trost, Saint Louis
- 1970 – Denny Hadican, Saint Louis
- 1971 – Al Henderson, Howard
- 1972 – Dan Counce, Saint Louis
- 1973 – Dan Counce, Saint Louis (2)
- 1974 – Richard Davy, Howard
- 1975 – Andy Atuegbu, San Francisco
- 1976 – Andy Atuegbu, San Francisco (2)
- 1977 – John Young, Hartwick
- 1978 – Dag Olavson, San Francisco
- 1979 – Obed Ariri, Clemson*
- 1980 – Roar Anderson, San Francisco
- 1981 – Bill Morrone, Connecticut
- 1982 – Paul DiBernardo, Indiana
- 1983 – John Stollmeyer, Indiana
- 1984 – Maxwell Amatasiro, Clemson
- 1985 – Dale Ervine, UCLA
- 1986 – Tom Stone, Duke
- 1987 – Bruce Murray, Clemson
- 1988 – Ken Snow, Indiana
- 1989 – Jeff Baicher, Santa Clara
- 1990 – Joe-Max Moore, UCLA
- 1991 – Claudio Reyna, Virginia
- 1992 – Claudio Reyna, Virginia (2)
- 1993 – Nate Friends, Virginia
- 1994 – Damian Silvera, Virginia
- 1995 – Mike Gentile, Wisconsin
- 1996 – Jesse Van Saun, St. John's
- 1997 – Seth George, UCLA
- 1998 – Aleksey Korol, Indiana
- 1999 – Yuri Lavrinenko, Indiana
- 2000 – Darin Lewis, Connecticut
- 2001 – Ryan Kneipper, North Carolina
- 2002 – Aaron Lopez, UCLA
- 2003 – Jacob Peterson, Indiana
- 2004 – Drew McAthy, UC Santa Barbara*
- 2005 – Jason Garey, Maryland
- 2006 – Nick Perera, UC Santa Barbara
- 2007 – Marcus Tracy, Wake Forest
- 2008 – Graham Zusi, Maryland
- 2009 – Jonathan Villanueva, Virginia
- 2010 – Scott Caldwell, Akron
- 2011 – Ben Speas, North Carolina
- 2012 – Steve Neumann, Georgetown*
- 2013 – Harrison Shipp, Notre Dame
- 2014 – Mac Steeves, Providence*
- 2015 – Jordan Morris, Stanford
- 2016 – Ian Harkes, Wake Forest*
- 2017 – Foster Langsdorf, Stanford
- 2018 – Amar Sejdič, Maryland
- 2019 – Daryl Dike, Virginia*
- 2020 – Jamil Roberts, Marshall
- 2021 – Isaiah Reid, Clemson
- 2022 – Nathan Opoku, Syracuse
- 2023 – Ousmane Sylla, Clemson
- 2024 – Maximilian Kissel, Vermont
- 2025 – Zach Ramsey, Washington

=== NCAA Men's Division I Defensive MOP Award ===
- 1959 – Jerry Knobbe, Saint Louis
- 1960 – Tom Hennessy, Saint Louis
- 1961 – Robert Malone, Saint Louis*
- 1962 – Ed Oswald, Saint Louis
- 1963 – Roger Rupp, Saint Louis
- 1964 – Myron Hura, Navy
- 1965 – Jack Gilsinn, Saint Louis
- 1966 – Mike Ivanow, San Francisco
- 1967 – Bill McDermott, Saint Louis
- 1968 – Mario Jelencovich, Maryland
- 1969 – Pat Leahy, Saint Louis
- 1970 – Ed Neusel, Saint Louis
- 1971 – Mori Diane, Howard
- 1972 – Bruce Arena, Cornell
- 1973 – Mark Demling, Saint Louis
- 1974 – Trevor Leiba, Howard
- 1975 – Peter Arnautoff, San Francisco
- 1976 – Peter Arnautoff, San Francisco (2)
- 1977 – Jeff Tipping, Hartwick
- 1978 – Andy Fry, San Francisco
- 1979 – Ed Gettemeier, SIUE
- 1980 – Andre Schweitzer, San Francisco
- 1981 – Erhardt Kapp, Connecticut
- 1982 – Pat Johnston, Duke*
- 1983 – Joe Schmid, Indiana
- 1984 – Joe Schmid, Indiana (2)
- 1985 – Paul Caligiuri, UCLA
- 1986 – Kelly Weadock, Duke
- 1987 – Tim Genovese, Clemson
- 1988 – Mike Anehauser, Indiana
- 1989 – Tony Meola, Virginia
- 1990 – Brad Friedel, UCLA
- 1991 – Jeff Causey, Virginia
- 1992 – Jeff Causey, Virginia (2)
- 1993 – Brian Bates, Virginia
- 1994 – Mark Peters, Virginia
- 1995 – Scott Lamphear, Wisconsin
- 1996 – Brent Sancho, St. John's
- 1997 – Matt Reis, UCLA
- 1998 – Nick Garcia, Indiana
- 1999 – Nick Garcia, Indiana (2)
- 2000 – Chris Gbandi, Connecticut
- 2001 – David Stokes, North Carolina
- 2002 – Zach Wells, UCLA
- 2003 – Jay Nolly, Indiana
- 2004 – Jay Nolly, Indiana (2)
- 2005 – Chris Seitz, Maryland
- 2006 – Andy Iro, UC Santa Barbara
- 2007 – Brian Edwards, Wake Forest
- 2008 – Omar Gonzalez, Maryland
- 2009 – Diego Restrepo, Virginia
- 2010 – Kofi Sarkodie, Akron
- 2011 – Isaac Cowles, Charlotte*
- 2012 – Luis Soffner, Indiana
- 2013 – Zack Steffen, Maryland*
- 2014 – Calle Brown, Virginia
- 2015 – Brandon Vincent, Stanford
- 2016 – Andrew Epstein, Stanford
- 2017 – Tomas Hilliard-Arce, Stanford
- 2018 – Dayne St. Clair, Maryland
- 2019 – Dylan Nealis, Georgetown
- 2020 – Roman Celentano, Indiana*
- 2021 – George Marks, Clemson
- 2022 – Russell Shealy, Syracuse
- 2023 – Pape Mar Boye, Clemson
- 2024 – Niklas Herceg, Vermont
- 2025 – Jadon Bowton, Washington
