= San Diego Toreros men's soccer =

American college soccer team

- Founded: 1980; 46 years ago
- University: University of San Diego
- Head coach: Brian Quinn (2nd season)
- Conference: WCC
- Location: San Diego, California
- Stadium: Torero Stadium (capacity: 8,000)
- Nickname: USD, Toreros
- Colors: Navy, white, and Toreros blue
Home	Away

NCAA tournament runner-up
- 1992

NCAA tournament College Cup
- 1992

NCAA tournament Quarterfinals
- 1992, 2012

NCAA tournament Round of 16
- 1992, 2012, 2024

NCAA tournament Round of 32
- 1992, 1993, 1998, 2000, 2001, 2012, 2014, 2024, 2025

NCAA tournament appearances
- 1990, 1992, 1993, 1994, 1995, 1998, 1999, 2000, 2001, 2002, 2003, 2009, 2012, 2014, 2022, 2023, 2024, 2025

Conference tournament championships
- 2022

Conference regular season championships
- 1992, 1995, 1998, 1999, 2000, 2009, 2012, 2014, 2015, 2023, 2024

For information on all University of San Diego sports, see San Diego Toreros

The San Diego Toreros men's soccer team is the men's soccer program that represents the University of San Diego (USD). The Toreros compete in NCAA Division I as a member of the West Coast Conference (WCC). The team plays its home games at Torero Stadium.

== Team honors ==
=== Conference regular season championships ===
USD has won nine WCC regular season championships.

Season	Conference	Coach	Overall record	Conference record
1992	WCC	Seamus McFadden	19–5–0	4–1–0
1995	WCC	Seamus McFadden	12–5–2	5–1–0
1998	WCC	Seamus McFadden	12–9–0	5–1–0
1999	WCC	Seamus McFadden	14–4–0	4–2–0
2000	WCC	Seamus McFadden	16–2–2	5–0–1
2000	WCC	Seamus McFadden	16–2–2	5–0–1
2012	WCC	Seamus McFadden	14–9–0	9–3–0
2014	WCC	Seamus McFadden	11–6–4	6–1–0
2015	WCC	Seamus McFadden	10–5–3	5–1–1

== Coaching records ==
Coach	Years	Overall	
Coach	Years	Record	Pct.
Seamus McFadden	1980–2017	385–288–71	.565
Brian Quinn	2018–present	7–7–5	.500
Total		392–293–76	.565

== Seasons ==
=== NCAA Tournament history ===
USD has appeared in 18 NCAA Tournaments, including one College Cup appearance. Their most recent performance came in 2025. Their combined NCAA record is 15–17–2.

Season	Round	Rival	Score	Postseas. record
1990	First round	Portland	W 4–2	1–0–0
1990	Second round	UCLA	L 1–2 ^{OT}	1–1–0
1992	First round	Stanford	W 3–0	2–1–0
1992	Second round	UCLA	W 2–1	3–1–0
1992	Quarterfinals	Indiana	W 2–0	4–1–0
1992	Semifinals	Davidson	W 3–2 ^{OT}	5–1–0
1992	Final	Virginia	L 0–2	5–2–0
1993	First round	UCLA	W 4–2 ^{OT}	6–2–0
1993	Second round	Cal State Fullerton	L 2–3 ^{OT}	6–3–0
1994	First round	Cal State Fullerton	L 1–3 ^{OT}	6–4–0
1995	First round	Santa Clara	L 1–4 ^{OT}	6–5–0
1998	First round	Cal State Fullerton	W 2–1	7–5–0
1998	Second round	Stanford	L 1–3 ^{2OT}	7–6–0
1999	First round	UCLA	L 1–4	7–7–0
2000	First round	UCLA	W 1–0 ^{OT}	8–7–0
2000	Second round	Creighton	L 0–3 ^{OT}	8–8–0
2001	First round	San Diego State	W 4–2	9–8–0
2001	Second round	UCLA	L 0–4	9–9–0
2002	First round	UC Santa Barbara	L 0–2	9–10–0
2003	Second round	Creighton	T 1–1	9–11–1
2009	Second round	UC Santa Barbara	L 0–1	9–12–1
2012	First round	Cal State Northridge	W 2–1 ^{2OT}	10–12–1
2012	Second round	UCLA	W 5–2	11–12–1
2012	Third round	Tulsa	W 2–1	12–12–1
2012	Quarterfinals	Georgetown	L 1–3	12–13–1
2014	First round	Cal State Fullerton	W 2–1 ^{2OT}	13–13–1
2014	Second round	UCLA	L 1–2 ^{OT}	13–14–1
2022	First round	Denver	L 0–1 ^{OT}	13–15–1
2023	First round	Cal Baptist	T 1–1 (2–3 p)	13–15–2
2024	First round	UC Davis	W 1–0	14–15–2
2024	Second round	Duke	W 1–0	15–15–2
2024	Third round	Vermont	L 0–1	15–16–2
2025	Second round	Grand Canyon	L 1–2	15–17–2
