= 1975 San Francisco Dons men's soccer team =

San Francisco Dons men's soccer 1975 season

1975 San Francisco Dons men's soccer
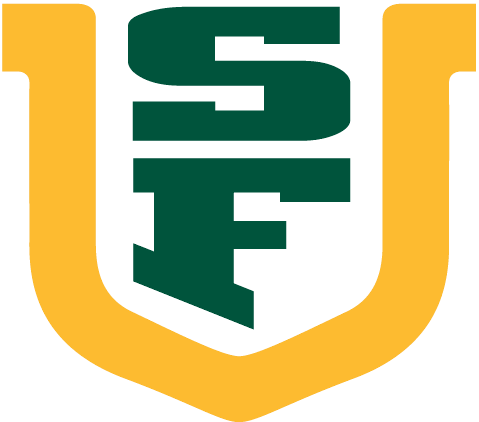

NCAA tournament College Cup National Champions WCISC champions

National Championship Game, W 4–0 vs. SIUE
- Conference: West Coast Intercollegiate Soccer Conference
- U. Soc. Coaches poll: No. 1
- Record: 21–1–2 (8–0–2 WCISC)
- Head coach: Steve Negoesco (13th season)
- Captain: Anthony Igwe
- Home stadium: Kezar Stadium

1975 West Coast Intercollegiate Soccer Conference standings
	Conf.					Overall
Team	W		L		T	W		L		T
San Francisco ‡	8	–	0	–	2	21	–	1	–	2
San Jose State	6	–	3	–	1	9	–	5	–	2
California			–					–
Pacific			–					–
UC Davis			–					–
Chico State			–					–
Sacramento State			–					–
San Francisco State			–					–
Cal State Hayward			–					–
Santa Clara	3	–	4	–	3	10	–	6	–	4
Stanford	2	–	7	–	1	5	–	12	–	2
‡-National champion

The 1975 San Francisco Dons men's soccer team represented the University of San Francisco during the 1975 NCAA Division I soccer season. It was the 45th season of the Dons fielding a men's varsity soccer program, and the eighth season of Steve Negoesco managing the program.

The 1975 season was hallmarked by San Francisco winning their second NCAA soccer tournament and their third overall national championship. The program finished the season with a 21–1–2 record and a 8–0–2 in West Coast Intercollegiate Soccer Conference play. Forwards Andy Atuegbu and Mal Roche led the Dons in goals scored during the season (14 each) and points (36 points each).

== Offseason ==
=== Acquisitions ===
==== Incoming transfers ====
Incoming transfers
Name	No.	Pos.	Ht.	Wt.	Hometown	Year	Previous school	Ref.
Misak Pirinjian	4	DF	5 ft 9 in (1.75 m)	175	Jaffa, ISR	Jr.	Marin	
Mal Roche	9	FW	6 ft 2 in (1.88 m)	188	Coventry, ENG	Jr.	Brockport	

==== Incoming recruits ====
1975 USF Recruits
Name	No.	Pos.	Ht.	Wt.	Hometown	High School	Ref.
Peter Arnautoff	1	FW	6 ft 2 in (1.88 m)	200	Oakland, California	Galileo	
Anthony Gray	3	DF	5 ft 11 in (1.80 m)	190	Monrovia, LBR	St. Patrick's (Liberia)	

== Roster ==
As of December 12, 1975

Note: Flags indicate national team as defined under FIFA eligibility rules; some limited exceptions apply. Players may hold more than one non-FIFA nationality.

No.	Pos.	Nation	Player
1	GK	USA	Peter Arnautoff
2	MF	NOR	Kjell Tvedt
3	DF	LBR	Anthony Gray
4	DF	ARM	Misak Pirinjian
5	DF	NGA	Anthony Igwe
6	FW	COL	Victor Arbelaez
7	FW	USA	Greg McKeown
8	MF	NOR	Bjørn Dahl
9	FW	ENG	Mal Roche
10	MF	NGA	Andy Atuegbu

No.	Pos.	Nation	Player
11	FW	USA	Paul Korn
12	GK	USA	Omar Suer
13	MF	USA	Jim Boyle
14	DF	MEX	Javier Plasencia
15	MF	NOR	Tom Tronstad
16	MF	HON	Oscar Granados
17	FW	NOR	Perry Fedje
18	DF	NOR	Bjørn Skagen
19	MF	USA	Mark Dillon
20	GK	SLV	Salvador Diaz

== Preseason ==
=== Coaches poll ===
The coaches poll was released in August 1975. San Francisco was picked to finish first place in the preseason poll.

WSISC Coaches' Poll
Predicted finish	Team	Points
1	San Francisco	91 (8)
2	Santa Clara	87 (2)
3	San Jose State	86 (1)
4	Pacific	68
5	California	65
6	UC Davis	63
7	Stanford	44
8	San Francisco State	28
9	Cal State Hayward	24
10	Sacramento State	21
11	Chico State	20

== Competitions ==
=== Regular season ===
Date Time, TV	Rank^{#}	Opponent^{#}	Result	Record	Site (Attendance) City, State
Regular season
September 20*; 12:00 p.m.	No. 10	at No. 2 Saint Louis	W 5–2	1–0	Forest Park Soccer Field; St. Louis, MO
September 21*; 3:00 p.m.	No. 10	vs. No. 5 Philadelphia Textile	L 2–4	1–1	Forest Park Soccer Field; St. Louis, MO
September 24; 1:00 p.m.	No. 7	San Francisco State	W 3–1	2–1 (1–0)	Kezar Stadium; San Francisco, CA
September 26*; 7:00 p.m.	No. 7	BYU	W 6–2	3–1	Kezar Stadium; San Francisco, CA
September 27*; 2:00 p.m.	No. 7	Cal State Los Angeles	W 6–0	4–1	Kezar Stadium; San Francisco, CA
October 1; 7:00 p.m.	No. 5	Cal State Sacramento	W 8–0	5–1 (2–0)	Kezar Stadium; San Francisco, CA
October 4; 7:00 p.m.	No. 5	Pacific	W 8–0	6–1 (3–0)	Kezar Stadium; San Francisco, CA
October 13*; 7:00 p.m.	No. 4	vs. No. 19 UCLA	W 5–2	7–1	Murray Field; Burlingame, CA
October 18*; 7:00 p.m.	No. 4	at Westmont	W 1–0	8–1	Thorrington Field; Santa Barbara, CA
October 19*; 7:00 p.m.	No. 4	at Cal State Fullerton	W 3–1	9–1	Eddie West Field; Santa Ana, CA
October 21; 7:00 p.m.	No. 3	at UC Davis	W 3–1	10–1 (4–0)	Toomey Field; Davis, CA
October 23; 7:00 p.m.	No. 3	vs. Stanford	W 5–0	11–1 (5–0)	Robertson Park; Livermore, CA
October 23; 7:00 p.m.	No. 2	at California	W 7–0	12–1 (6–0)	Edwards Stadium; Berkeley, CA
October 30*; 7:00 p.m.	No. 1	vs. Washington	W 10–1	13–1	Kennelly Field; San Rafael, CA
November 1; 7:00 p.m.	No. 1	San Jose State	T 1–1 ^{2OT}	13–1–1 (6–0–1)	Kezar Stadium; San Francisco, CA
November 5; 7:00 p.m.	No. 3	vs. Santa Clara	W 1–0	14–1–1 (7–0–1)	Henry Arnold Field; Sonoma, CA
November 7; 7:00 p.m.	No. 3	Chico State	T 1–1 ^{2OT}	14–1–2 (7–0–2)	Kezar Stadium; San Francisco, CA
November 9*; 7:00 p.m.	No. 5	Fresno State	W 4–0	15–1–2	Kezar Stadium; San Francisco, CA
November 12; 7:00 p.m.	No. 5	Cal State East Bay	W 3–0	16–1–2 (8–0–2)	Kezar Stadium; San Francisco, CA
November 13; 7:00 p.m.	No. 5	vs. USC	W 2–1	17–1–2	Holt Stadium; San Luis Obispo, CA
NCAA tournament
November 18; 7:00 p.m.	No. 5	No. 14 UCLA; Second round	W 4–1	18–1–2	Kezar Stadium; San Francisco, CA
November 29; 7:00 p.m.	No. 5	No. 16 Cal State Fullerton; Quarterfinal	W 3–2	19–1–2	Kezar Stadium; San Francisco, CA
December 5; 7:00 p.m.	No. 5	vs. No. 3 Brown; College Cup semifinal	W 2–1 ^{3OT}	20–1–2	Cougar Field; Edwardsville, IL
December 7; 12:00 p.m.	No. 5	vs. No. 4 SIUE; College Cup final	W 4–0	21–1–2	Cougar Field (4,400); Edwardsville, IL
*Non-conference game. ^{#}Rankings from United Soccer Coaches. (#) Tournament seedings in parentheses. All times are in Pacific Time.

== Postseason ==
=== 1976 NASL draft ===
Three players were selected in the 1976 NASL draft.

Player	Team	Round	Pick #	Position
Víctor Arbeláez	San Diego Sockers	2	26	FW
Paul Korn	Tampa Bay Rowdies	2	38	FW
Mark Dillon	San Jose Earthquakes	4	61	DF
