= 1991 Virginia Cavaliers men's soccer team =

American college soccer season

1991 Virginia Cavaliers men's soccer

National Champions

ACC Regular Season Champions ACC Tournament Champions

NCAA Tournament, Final - T 0–0 (W 3–2 pen.) vs. Santa Clara
- Conference: Atlantic Coast Conference
- Record: 19–1–2 (5–1–0 ACC)
- Head coach: Bruce Arena (14th season)
- Assistant coach: George Gelnovatch (3rd season)
- Captain: Claudio Reyna
- Home stadium: Scott Stadium

1991 ACC men's soccer standings
	Conf.					Overall
Team	W		L		T	W		L		T
No. 1 Virginia ‡	5	–	1	–	0	19	–	1	–	2
No. 6 NC State +	3	–	2	–	1	13	–	5	–	2
No. 15 Wake Forest +	3	–	2	–	1	13	–	5	–	3
No. 16 North Carolina +	3	–	3	–	0	15	–	6	–	1
No. 20 Clemson +	2	–	3	–	1	13	–	6	–	2
Duke	2	–	4	–	0	10	–	9	–	0
Maryland	1	–	4	–	1	5	–	9	–	4
‡ – ACC Men's Soccer Tournament champion + – Invited to the 1991 NCAA Division I Men's Soccer Championship; Rankings from United Soccer Coaches

The 1991 Virginia Cavaliers men's soccer team represented the University of Virginia during the 1991 NCAA Division I men's soccer season. It was the program's 52nd season of existence, and their 38th season in the Atlantic Coast Conference.

The season saw Virginia win their second NCAA Division I Men's Soccer Championship, and their first outright championship. The title, sparked a three-year run where they would win the title three more times in what was considered a college soccer dynasty. Additionally, the Cavaliers won their second-ever ACC Men's Soccer Tournament and their 10th ACC regular season title.

The 1991 was the final season the Cavaliers played at Scott Stadium. The following year, they moved to 8,000-seat Klöckner Stadium.

The program boasted several notable future players and coaches including Clint Peay and Claudio Reyna who collectively won over 100 caps for the United States men's national soccer team.

== Squad ==
The following players played for Virginia's soccer team in 1991.

Note: Flags indicate national team as defined under FIFA eligibility rules; some limited exceptions apply. Players may hold more than one non-FIFA nationality.

No.	Pos.	Nation	Player
—	FW	(United States) USA	Robert Atanda
—	MF	(United States) USA	Brad Agoos
—	DF	(United States) USA	Brian Bates
—	DF	(United States) USA	Craig Brannan
—	GK	(United States) USA	Jeff Causey
—	DF	(United States) USA	Scott Champ
—	FW	(United States) USA	Ben Crawley
—	MF	(United States) USA	Blake Cronin
—	GK	(United States) USA	Tom Henske

No.	Pos.	Nation	Player
—	MF	(United States) USA	Mike Huwiler
—	MF	(United States) USA	Erik Imler
—	DF	(United States) USA	Tim Kunihiro
—	MF	(United States) USA	Claudio Reyna
—	DF	(United States) USA	Clint Peay
—	FW	(United States) USA	Brian Siracusa
—	MF	(United States) USA	Richie Williams
—	FW	(United States) USA	A. J. Wood
—	MF	(United States) USA	Lyle Yorks

== Schedule ==
Date Time, TV	Rank^{#}	Opponent^{#}	Result	Record	Site (Attendance) City, State
Regular season
September 7*	No. 3	Creighton; Coca-Cola Classic	T 3–3 ^{2OT}	0–0–1	Scott Stadium; Charlottesville, VA
September 8*	No. 3	Rutgers; Coca-Cola Classic	W 2–1 ^{OT}	1–0–1	Scott Stadium; Charlottesville, VA
September 15	No. 3	at Maryland; Tydings Cup	W 3–0	2–0–1 (1–0–0)	Byrd Stadium; College Park, MD
September 18*	No. 1	Virginia Tech; Commonwealth Clash	W 3–0	3–0–1	Scott Stadium; Charlottesville, VA
September 22	No. 1	No. 14 Wake Forest	L 0–2	3–1–1 (1–1–0)	Scott Stadium; Charlottesville, VA
September 25*	No. 6	at James Madison	W 2–0	4–1–1	Showker Field; Harrisonburg, VA
September 29	No. 6	No. 4 North Carolina	W 1–0	5–1–1 (2–1–0)	Scott Stadium; Charlottesville, VA
October 5	No. 4	at No. 8 NC State	W 4–3	6–1–1 (3–1–0)	Method Road; Raleigh, NC
October 9*	No. 4	No. 20 William & Mary	W 2–1	7–1–1	Scott Stadium; Charlottesville, VA
October 12*	No. 4	at American	W 2–0	8–1–1	Reeves Field; Washington, DC
October 15*	No. 3	at Richmond	W 3–2	9–1–1	City Stadium; Richmond, VA
October 20	No. 3	at No. 10 Duke	W 5–2 ^{OT}	10–1–1 (4–1–0)	Koskinen Stadium; Durham, NC
October 23*	No. 1	Liberty	W 4–0	11–1–1	Scott Stadium; Charlottesville, VA
October 27	No. 1	No. 18 Clemson	W 2–1	12–1–1 (5–1–0)	Scott Stadium; Charlottesville, VA
October 30*	No. 1	Mount St. Mary's	W 6–0	13–1–1	Scott Stadium; Charlottesville, VA
November 3*	No. 1	George Mason	W 2–1	14–1–1	Scott Stadium; Charlottesville, VA
ACC Tournament
November 8	(1) No. 1	at (4) No. 13 North Carolina; Semifinals	W 1–0	15–1–1	Fetzer Field; Chapel Hill, NC
November 10	(1) No. 1	vs. (3) No. 8 Wake Forest; ACC Championship	W 3–1	16–1–1	Fetzer Field; Chapel Hill, NC
NCAA Tournament
November 24	No. 1	Hartford; Second Round	W 2–1 ^{OT}	17–1–1	Scott Stadium; Charlottesville, VA
December 1	No. 1	Yale; Quarterfinals	W 2–0	18–1–1	Scott Stadium; Charlottesville, VA
December 6	No. 1	vs. No. 3 Saint Louis; Semifinals	W 3–2 ^{3OT}	19–1–1	USF Soccer Stadium (3,925); Tampa, FL
December 8	No. 1	vs. No. 2 Santa Clara; National Championship	T 0–0 (W 3–1 PK) ^{4OT}	19–1–2	USF Soccer Stadium (3,925); Tampa, FL
*Non-conference game. ^{#}Rankings from United Soccer Coaches. (#) Tournament seedings in parentheses.
