= 2001 North Carolina Tar Heels men's soccer team =

American college soccer season

2001 North Carolina Tar Heels men's soccer

National Champions

UNCG Classic Champions

NCAA Tournament, Winners
- Conference: Atlantic Coast Conference

Ranking
- Coaches: No. 1
- Record: 21–2–3 (5–1–2 ACC)
- Head coach: Elmar Bolowich (13th season)
- Home stadium: Fetzer Field

2001 Atlantic Coast Conference men's soccer standings
	Conf.					Overall
Team	W		L		T	W		L		T
Virginia +	6	–	0	–	0	17	–	2	–	1
No. 1 North Carolina +	4	–	2	–	0	21	–	3	–	2
Clemson ‡	4	–	2	–	0	19	–	5	–	2
Wake Forest +	3	–	2	–	1	13	–	6	–	2
Duke	2	–	4	–	0	8	–	10	–	1
Maryland +	1	–	4	–	1	11	–	9	–	1
NC State	0	–	6	–	0	4	–	15	–	0
‡ – 2001 ACC Tournament champion + – Invited to the 2001 NCAA tournament; Rankings from United Soccer Coaches; Source: ACC

The 2001 North Carolina Tar Heels men's soccer team represented University of North Carolina at Chapel Hill in the 2001 NCAA Division I men's soccer season. The team was coached by Elmar Bolowich, who was in his thirteenth season with North Carolina. The Tar Heels played their home games at Fetzer Field in Chapel Hill, North Carolina and competed in the Atlantic Coast Conference.

The 2001 season saw the Tar Heels win their first national championship, defeating Indiana in the final.

== Roster ==
Note: Flags indicate national team as defined under FIFA eligibility rules; some limited exceptions apply. Players may hold more than one non-FIFA nationality.

No.	Pos.	Nation	Player
1	GK	USA	Michael Ueltschey
2	FW	USA	David Stokes
4	DF	ENG	Danny Jackson
5	DF	USA	Chris Leitch
6	FW	USA	Jonathan Davis
7	FW	USA	Marcus Storey
8	MF	USA	Logan Pause
9	FW	JPN	Noz Yamauchi
10	MF	USA	Tim Merritt
11	MF	USA	Ray Fumo
12	MF	USA	Ryan Kneipper
13	DF	USA	Wes Ange

No.	Pos.	Nation	Player
14	DF	USA	Roy Kelly
15	FW	USA	Mike Gell
16	FW	USA	David Testo
17	DF	USA	Ryan Schumacher
18	FW	USA	Sean McGinty
19	MF	USA	Matt Crawford
20	MF	USA	Adam Davis
21	MF	USA	Grant Porter
23	GK	USA	Jay Batt
24	MF	USA	Zack Mansfield
25	MF	USA	Ryan Levitan
26	GK	USA	Jason Strange
27	GK	USA	Nick Jordan

== Schedule ==
Date Time, TV	Rank^{#}	Opponent^{#}	Result	Record	Site (Attendance) City, State
Exhibition
August 25*; 7:00 pm		at UMass	Not reported		Rudd Field; Amherst, MA
Regular season
August 31*; 7:00 pm	No. 5	East Carolina	W 8–1	1–0–0	Fetzer Field (1,505); Chapel Hill, NC
September 3*; 7:00 pm	No. 5	Appalachian State	W 3–0	2–0–0	Fetzer Field (1,035); Chapel Hill, NC
September 7*; 6:00 pm	No. 4	vs. Cincinnati; St. Louis Soccer Classic semifinals	W 2–1	3–0–0	Hermann Stadium; St. Louis, MO
September 9*; 3:00 pm	No. 4	at No. 6 Saint Louis; St. Louis Soccer Classic final	L 1–2	3–1–0	Hermann Stadium (1,013); St. Louis, MO
September 16*; 2:00 pm	No. 11	UNCG	W 2–1	4–1–0	Fetzer Field (745); Chapel Hill, NC
September 22; 7:00 pm	No. 10	at No. 6 Virginia; South's Oldest Rivalry	L 0–2	4–2–0 (0–1–0)	Klöckner Stadium (3,193); Charlottesville, VA
September 25*; 7:00 pm	No. 14	UNC Asheville	W 3–0	5–2–0	Fetzer Field (505); Chapel Hill, NC
September 29; 7:00 pm	No. 14	Duke; Carlyle Cup	W 1–0	6–2–0 (1–1–0)	Fetzer Field (3,051); Chapel Hill, NC
October 2*; 7:00 pm	No. 12	vs. No. 21 William & Mary; Sportsplex Showcase	W 4–1	7–2–0	Virginia Beach Sportsplex (574); Virginia Beach, VA
October 7; 2:00 pm	No. 12	Maryland	W 2–1	8–2–0 (2–1–0)	Fetzer Field (1,057); Chapel Hill, NC
October 12*; 5:00 pm	No. 10	vs. Georgia State; UNCG Classic Semifinal	W 7–0	9–2–0	UNCG Soccer Stadium (728); Greensboro, NC
October 14*; 1:00 pm	No. 10	vs. No. 18 South Florida; UNCG Classic Final	W 5–0	10–2–0	UNCG Soccer Stadium (449); Greensboro, NC
October 17*; 1:00 pm	No. 7	at Charlotte	W 3–0	11–2–0	Transamerica Field (1,054); Charlotte, NC
October 21; 2:00 pm	No. 7	at NC State; NC State rivalry	W 4–0	12–2–0 (3–1–0)	Method Road (800); Raleigh, NC
October 24*; 7:00 pm	No. 6	Old Dominion	W 2–0	13–2–0	Fetzer Field (705); Chapel Hill, NC
October 27; 7:00 pm	No. 6	at No. 21 Wake Forest; Wake Forest rivalry	L 2–4	13–3–0 (3–2–0)	Spry Stadium (1,819); Winston-Salem, NC
November 3; 7:00 pm	No. 8	No. 6 Clemson; Quarterfinals	W 1–0	14–3–0 (4–2–0)	Fetzer Field (1,455); Chapel Hill, NC
November 9; 7:00 pm	No. 7	No. 20 South Carolina; Battle of the Carolinas	W 1–0	15–3–0	Fetzer Field (2,055); Chapel Hill, NC
ACC Tournament
November 15; 4:00 pm	(2) No. 6	vs. (7) NC State; Quarterfinals	W 2–0	16–3–0	Riggs Field (2,187); Clemson, SC
November 16; 7:00 pm	(2) No. 6	at (3) No. 8 Clemson; Semifinals	L 1–2	16–4–0	Riggs Field (2,812); Clemson, SC
NCAA Tournament
November 25*; 1:00 pm	(7) No. 8	Towson; Second round	W 3–0	17–4–0	Fetzer Field (475); Chapel Hill, NC
December 2*; 7:00 pm	(7) No. 8	American; Third round	W 1–0 ^{OT}	18–4–0	Fetzer Field (905); Chapel Hill, NC
December 8*; 1:00 pm	(7) No. 8	No. 25 Fairleigh Dickinson; Quarterfinals	W 3–2 ^{3OT}	19–4–0	Fetzer Field (1,205); Chapel Hill, NC
December 14*; 5:00 pm	(7) No. 8	vs. (3) No. 4 Stanford; College Cup Semifinals	W 3–2 ^{4OT}	20–4–0	Crew Stadium (4,820); Columbus, OH
December 16*; 1:00 pm	(7) No. 8	vs. (4) No. 3 Indiana; College Cup Final	W 2–0	21–4–0	Crew Stadium (7,113); Columbus, OH
*Non-conference game. ^{#}Rankings from United Soccer Coaches. (#) Tournament seedings in parentheses. All times are in Eastern Time.

== Awards and honors ==
Individual Awards
Player	Position	Award	Ref.
Marcus Storey	FW	ACC Freshman of the Year	

All-American
Player	NSCAA	SA	TDS	CSN	Designation
Danny Jackson	1	1	1	1	Consensus
The NCAA recognizes a selection to all four of the NSCAA, SA, TDS, and CSN first teams for consensus selections. HM = Honorable mention. Source: Men's Soccer Media Guide

All-ACC
Player	Position	Team
Danny Jackson	DF	First Team
Ryan Kneipper	FW	Second Team
Chris Leitch	DF	Second Team
Logan Pause	MF	Second Team
David Testo	MF	All-Tournament Team
Noz Yamauchi	FW	All-Tournament Team

== Postseason ==
=== 2002 MLS SuperDraft ===
The following players were selected in the 2002 MLS SuperDraft.

Player	Position	Round	Pick	Club	Ref.
Danny Jackson	DF	2	16	Colorado Rapids	
Chris Leitch	DF	4	47	Columbus Crew	
