= 1991 Saint Louis Billikens men's soccer team =

American college soccer season

1991 Saint Louis Billikens men's soccer
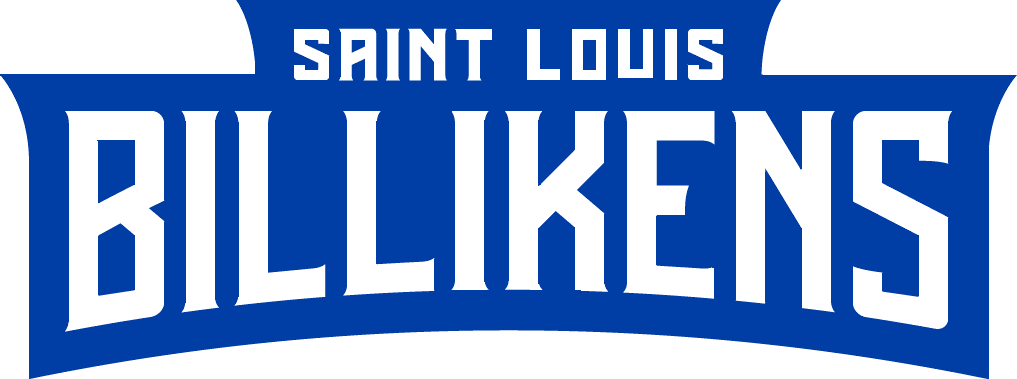

GMC regular season and tournament champions St. Louis Soccer Master-Umbro Classic champions

NCAA tournament, College Cup
- Conference: Great Midwest Conference

Ranking
- Coaches: No. 3
- Record: 20–2–2 (5–0–0 GMC)
- Head coach: Joe Clarke (9th season)
- Captain: Steve Kuntz

1991 Great Midwest Conference men's soccer standings
| | Conf. | | | | | Overall |
| Team | W | | L | | T | W | | L | | T |
|---|---|---|---|---|---|---|---|---|---|---|
| No. 3 Saint Louis ‡ | 5 | – | 0 | – | 0 | 20 | – | 2 | – | 2 |
| Memphis State | 4 | – | 1 | – | 0 | 7 | – | 9 | – | 2 |
| Cincinnati | 2 | – | 2 | – | 1 | 9 | – | 12 | – | 1 |
| Marquette | 2 | – | 3 | – | 0 | 8 | – | 14 | – | 0 |
| DePaul | 1 | – | 4 | – | 0 | 1 | – | 15 | – | 2 |
| UAB | 0 | – | 4 | – | 1 | 8 | – | 9 | – | 2 |
‡-Conference champion + - Invited to the 1991 NCAA Division I Men's Soccer Championship; Rankings from NSCAA

The 1991 Saint Louis Billikens men's soccer team represented Saint Louis University during the 1991 NCAA Division I men's soccer season. The Billikens played their first season in the now-defunct Great Midwest Conference, where they were the inaugural regular-season and tournament champions. Saint Louis earned an automatic bid to the 1991 NCAA Division I men's soccer tournament, where they had their best NCAA tournament appearance since 1974. Saint Louis reached the College Cup before losing to the eventual national champions, Virginia.

Saint Louis were led by future United States men's national soccer team striker Brian McBride, who led Saint Louis with 20 goals throughout the season. McBride later had a professional career playing with Columbus Crew and Chicago Fire in Major League Soccer as well as with Fulham in the Premier League. Additionally, the 1991 team contained future professionals players and coaches: Mike Sorber, Shane Battelle, Steve Kuntz and Rory Dames.

== Roster ==
Note: Flags indicate national team as defined under FIFA eligibility rules; some limited exceptions apply. Players may hold more than one non-FIFA nationality.

| No. | Pos. | Nation | Player |
|---|---|---|---|
| — | FW | USA | Brian McBride |
| — | MF | USA | Mike Sorber |
| — | | USA | Dan Merlo |
| — | | USA | Chris Santel |
| — | | USA | Scott McDoniel |
| — | DF | USA | Shane Battelle |
| — | | USA | John Lynn |
| — | | USA | Jason Huber |
| — | | USA | Jeff Davis |
| — | | USA | Mike Byrne |

| No. | Pos. | Nation | Player |
|---|---|---|---|
| — | | USA | Jeff Mika |
| — | DF | USA | Steve Kuntz |
| — | | USA | Chris Guzman |
| — | | USA | Ryan DeGrand |
| — | | USA | Ed Pinon |
| — | | USA | Shaun Fogarty |
| — | | USA | Rory Dames |
| — | | USA | Jay Zaber |
| — | | USA | Todd Molski |
| — | | USA | Eric Burdge |

== Schedule ==
| Date Time, TV | Rank^{#} | Opponent^{#} | Result | Record | Site (Attendance) City, State |
Regular season
| 09-06-1991* | | vs. Penn State adidas MetLife Classic | W 2–1 | 1–0–0 | Bill Armstrong Stadium (100); Bloomington, IN |
| 09-08-1991* | | vs. Stanford adidas MetLife Classic | T 1–1 ^{OT} | 1–0–1 | Bill Armstrong Stadium (100); Bloomington, IN |
| 09-11-1991* | | Tulsa | W 3–0 | 2–0–1 | St. Louis Soccer Park (1,352); St. Louis, MO |
| 09-13-1991* | | Notre Dame | W 3–0 | 3–0–1 | St. Louis Soccer Park (3,155); St. Louis, MO |
| 09-15-1991* | | at Evansville | W 2–0 | 4–0–1 | Arad McCutchan Stadium (1,800); Evansville, IN |
| 09-20-1991 | | at DePaul | W 3–1 | 5–0–1 (1–0–0) | Cacciatore Stadium (250); Chicago, IL |
| 09-22-1991* | | at Indiana | L 1–2 | 5–1–1 | Bill Armstrong Stadium (1,322); Bloomington, IN |
| 09-27-1991* | | SIU Edwardsville; Bronze Boot | W 3–2 | 6–1–1 | St. Louis Soccer Park (3,678); St. Louis, MO |
| 10-02-1991* | | at Illinois State | W 2–1 | 7–1–1 | Hancock Stadium (267); Normal, IL |
| 10-05-1991* | | San Diego State; St. Louis Soccer Master-Umbro Classic | T 0–0 ^{OT} | 7–1–2 | St. Louis Soccer Park (1,704); St. Louis, MO |
| 10-06-1991* | | Quincy; St. Louis Soccer Master-Umbro Classic | W 3–0 | 8–1–2 | St. Louis Soccer Park (1,242); St. Louis, MO |
| 10-12-1991 | | UAB | W 1–0 | 9–1–2 (2–0–0) | St. Louis Soccer Park (163); St. Louis, MO |
| 10-13-1991 | | at Marquette | W 2–1 ^{OT} | 10–1–2 (3–0–0) | Legion Field (318); Milwaukee, WI |
| 10-18-1991* | | North Texas | W 3–0 | 11–1–2 | St. Louis Soccer Park (1,643); St. Louis, MO |
| 10-20-1991* | | SMU | W 2–0 | 12–1–2 | St. Louis Soccer Park (751); St. Louis, MO |
| 10-23-1991 | | Memphis State | W 6–2 | 13–1–2 (4–0–0) | St. Louis Soccer Park (751); St. Louis, MO |
| 10-26-1991* | | at Northern Illinois | W 2–0 | 14–1–2 | Brigham Field (371); DeKalb, IL |
| 10-30-1991* | | at Eastern Illinois | W 1–0 | 15–1–2 | Lakeside Soccer Field (84); Charleston, IL |
| 11-03-1991 | | Cincinnati | W 3–1 | 16–1–2 (5–0–0) | St. Louis Soccer Park (436); St. Louis, MO |
GMC Tournament
| 11-09-1991 | | vs. Marquette; Semifinal | W 5–0 | 17–1–2 | St. Louis Soccer Park (150); St. Louis, MO |
| 11-10-1991 | | vs. Cincinnati; Championship | W 5–0 | 18–1–2 | St. Louis Soccer Park (625); St. Louis, MO |
NCAA Tournament
| 11-23-1991 | | vs. North Carolina; Second round | W 4–0 | 19–1–2 | St. Louis Soccer Park (1,085); St. Louis, MO |
| 11-30-1991 | | vs. NC State; Quarterfinal | W 3–0 | 20–1–2 | St. Louis Soccer Park (1,835); St. Louis, MO |
| 12-06-1991 | | vs. Virginia; Semifinal | L 2–3 ^{3OT} | 20–2–2 | USF Soccer Stadium (3,925); Tampa, FL |
*Non-conference game. ^{#}Rankings from United Soccer Coaches. (#) Tournament seedings in parentheses.
