= Miguel Saavedra =

American soccer player

Personal information
- Date of birth: July 3, 1983 (age 43)
- Place of birth: Milwaukee, Wisconsin, U.S.
- Height: 5 ft 11 in (1.80 m)
- Position: Midfielder

Senior career*
Years	Team	Apps	(Gls)
2001	Dallas Burn	0	(0)
2001	→ Atlanta Silverbacks (loan)	1	(0)
2001	→ Nashville Metros (loan)	4	(0)
2002	Chicago Fire	0	(0)
2002	→ Milwaukee Rampage (loan)	14	(1)
- * Club domestic league appearances and goals

Miguel Saavedra is an American retired soccer midfielder who played professionally in the USL A-League.

Saavedra, the son of Mexican immigrant parents, grew up in Milwaukee and attended Milwaukee Trade and Technical High School. In January 2001, Saavedra signed with Major League Soccer as a Project 40 player. In February 2001, the Dallas Burn selected Saavedra in the sixth round (66th overall) of the 2001 MLS SuperDraft. On May 25, 2001, Saavedra played one game on loan to the Atlanta Silverbacks of the USL A-League. In June 2001, the Burn sent Saavedra on loan to the Nashville Metros for four games. On January 15, 2002, the Chicago Fire acquired Saavedra and Aleksey Korol from the Burn for the Fire's 2002 sixth round draft pick. Saavedra spent most of the 2002 season on loan to the Milwaukee Rampage, including the USL A-League championship game, won by Milwaukee. Although Saavedra never played a league game with the Fire, in April 2002, he came on in the 78th minute for David Vaudreuil in a quarterfinal loss to Morelia in the 2002 CONCACAF Champions' Cup. The Fire waived Saavedra on November 5, 2002.

Saavedra played several games for the United States men's national under-20 soccer team.
