= J Batt =

American athletic director

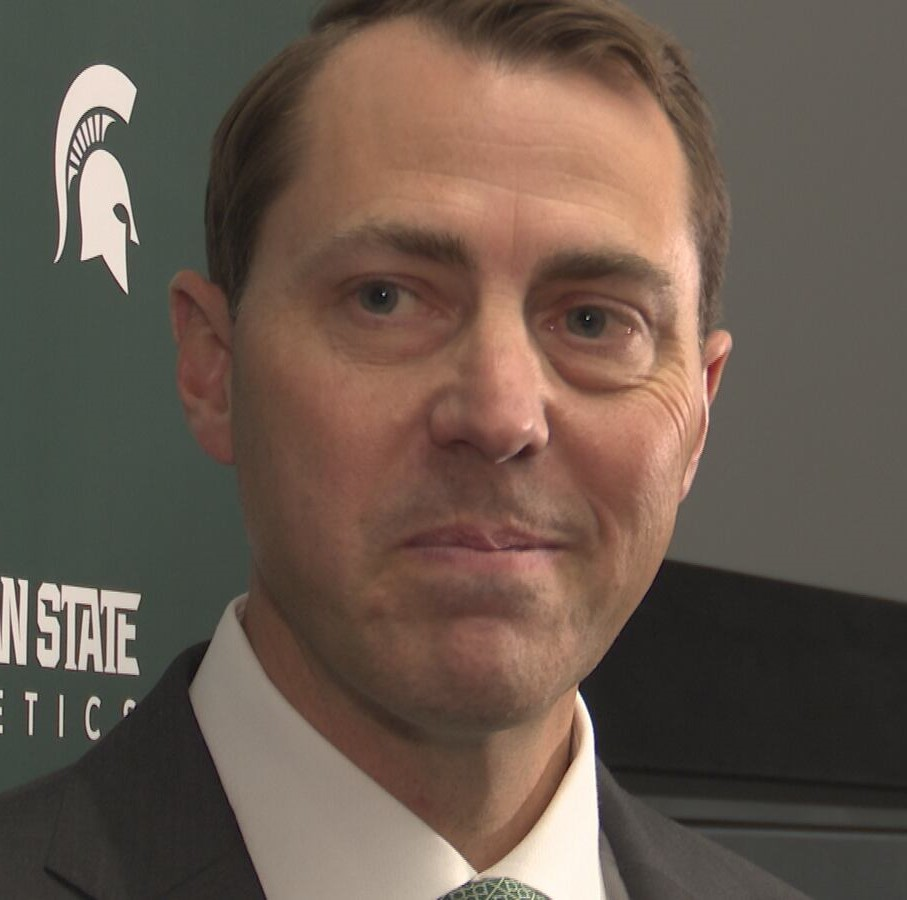
- Batt in 2025

Current position
- Title: Athletic Director
- Team: Kentucky
- Conference: SEC

Biographical details
- Born: December 30, 1981 (age 44); Champaign, Illinois, U.S.
- Education: North Carolina

Administrative career (AD unless noted)
- 2005: North Carolina (graduate assistant)
- 2005–2007: William and Mary (title)
- 2007–2009: James Madison (director of major gifts for athletics)
- 2009–2013: Maryland (executive director of the Terrapin Club)
- 2013–2017: East Carolina (associate AD)
- 2017–2022: Alabama (deputy AD)
- 2022–2025: Georgia Tech
- 2025–2026: Michigan State
- 2026–present: Kentucky

Jason "J" Batt is the director of athletics for the University of Kentucky. He succeeded Mitch Barnhart, who retired on June 30, 2026 after 24 years in the role. He previously served as athletic director for the Georgia Institute of Technology and Michigan State. He also served as deputy athletic director for the University of Alabama and associate athletic director for East Carolina University.

== Early life ==
Batt was born December 30, 1981 in Champaign, Illinois and was raised in Charlottesville, Virginia. Batt was a backup goalkeeper at the University of North Carolina at Chapel Hill where the team won a national championship in 2001.

== Career ==
During Batt's 20 years in collegiate athletics, he averages working two and a half years at each institution, having also spent time employed at the University of Maryland, College Park, James Madison University, the College of William & Mary, and the University of North Carolina at Chapel Hill.

On November 30, 2025, following a 4–8 season that left the Spartans ineligible for a bowl game, Batt dismissed head coach Jonathan Smith, stating that the program had not met its “shared standards.” Later that day, Batt hired former Northwestern head coach Pat Fitzgerald to lead the football program.

Batt was announced as the new athletic director at the University of Kentucky on June 15, 2026, and officially took office on July 28.
