= 1977 NCAA Division I soccer tournament =

1977 College Cup

Tournament details
- Country: United States
- Venue(s): California Memorial Stadium; Berkeley, California
- Teams: 24

Final positions
- Champions: Hartwick College (1st title)
- Runners-up: San Francisco
- Third place: SIU Edwardsville
- Fourth place: Brown

Tournament statistics
- Matches played: 24
- Goals scored: 86 (3.58 per match)
- Attendance: 28,577 (1,191 per match)
- Top goal scorer(s): (United States) Art Napolitano, Hartwick (4)

Awards
- Best player: (Scotland) John Young, Hartwick (Offense) (England) Jeff Tipping, Hartwick (Defense)

The 1977 NCAA Division I soccer tournament was the 19th annual tournament organized by the National Collegiate Athletic Association to determine the national men's college soccer champion among its Division I members in the United States.

The final match was played at California Memorial Stadium in Berkeley, California on December 4.

Hartwick College won their first national title, defeating two-time defending champions San Francisco in the final, 2–1.

== Qualifying ==
One team made their debut appearance in the NCAA Division I soccer tournament: Princeton.

== Bracket ==
First round
Brown	2
Dartmouth	1
Rhode Island	1
Vermont	0
Clemson	4
George Washington	0
Howard
Appalachian State	w/o
Hartwick	5
St. Francis (NY)	1
Long Island	1
Cornell	2
Penn State	5
Penn	1
Princeton	0
Philadelphia Textile	3

Second round
Brown	3
Rhode Island	1
Clemson	3
Appalachian State	1
Hartwick	3
Cornell	1
Penn State	0
Philadelphia Textile	3
Cleveland State	2
Saint Louis	0
SIU Edwardsville (4OT)	3
Indiana	2
San Francisco	2
Air Force	1
UCLA	3
California	1

Quarterfinals
Brown	2
Clemson	1
Hartwick	2
Philadelphia Textile	0
Cleveland State	2
SIU Edwardsville (3OT)	3
San Francisco	4
UCLA	1

Semifinals
Brown	1
Hartwick	4
SIU Edwardsville	1
San Francisco	2

Championship
Hartwick	2
San Francisco	1
Third place
Brown	2
SIU Edwardsville	3

== Championship rounds ==
=== Final ===
December 4, 1977

Hartwick College	2–1	San Francisco

California Memorial Stadium, Berkeley, California
Attendance: 16,503

== See also ==
- 1977 NCAA Division II Soccer Championship
- 1977 NCAA Division III Soccer Championship
- 1977 NAIA Soccer Championship
