= 1991 NCAA Division I men's soccer tournament =

1991 Men's College Cup

Tournament details
- Country: United States
- Venue(s): USF Soccer Stadium; Tampa, Florida
- Teams: 28

Final positions
- Champions: Virginia (2nd title)
- Runners-up: Santa Clara
- Semifinalists: Indiana; Saint Louis

Tournament statistics
- Matches played: 27
- Goals scored: 84 (3.11 per match)
- Attendance: 48,154 (1,783 per match)
- Top goal scorer(s): Brian McBride, Saint Louis (4); Alan Prampin, SMU (3); Bill Donnell, Yale (4)

Awards
- Best player: Claudio Reyna, Virginia (offensive); Jeff Causey, Virginia (defensive)

The 1991 NCAA Division I men's soccer tournament was the 33rd annual tournament organized by the National Collegiate Athletic Association to determine the national champion of men's collegiate soccer among its Division I members in the United States.

Virginia defeated Santa Clara in the championship game in a penalty kick shootout (3–1) after the match ended in a 0–0 tie after four overtime periods. This was a re-match of the 1989 tournament final at Rutgers Stadium when both teams were crowned co-national champions (before the NCAA adopted penalty kick shootouts for settling tied games).

The final match was played on December 8 at the USF Soccer Stadium in Tampa, Florida. All the other games were played at the home field of the higher seeded team.

== Qualifying ==
Five teams made their debut appearances in the NCAA Division I men's soccer tournament: Florida International, Furman, Hartford, UNC Charlotte, and Tulsa.

== Bracket ==
First round
Hartford	2
Columbia	1
Yale	3
Boston University	2
Seton Hall (pen.)	1
Adelphi	1
North Carolina (2OT)	1
UNC Charlotte	0
Furman (2OT)	1
Wake Forest	0
NC State	3
Clemson	1
Wisconsin	1
Evansville	0
Rutgers	2
Old Dominion	0
SMU	5
Tulsa	3
Portland (4OT)	1
Florida International	0
Fresno State	1
San Francisco	0
Santa Clara (4OT)	2
Stanford	1

Second round
Virginia (4OT)	2
Hartford	1
Yale	4
Seton Hall	3
Saint Louis	4
North Carolina	0
Furman	1
NC State	4
Indiana (2OT)	2
Wisconsin	0
Rutgers	2
SMU	3
UCLA	3
Portland	0
Fresno State	0
Santa Clara	3

Quarterfinals
Virginia	2
Yale	0
Saint Louis	3
NC State	0
Indiana (pen.)	2
SMU	2
UCLA	1
Santa Clara	2

Semifinals
Virginia (3OT)	3
Saint Louis	2
Indiana	0
Santa Clara	2

Championship
Virginia (4OT, pen.)	0(3)
Santa Clara	0(1)

== Final ==
December 8, 1991

Virginia	0–0 (a.e.t.)	Santa Clara
	Report
Penalties
Huwiler (penalty scored); Crawley (penalty scored); Imler (penalty scored)	3–1	? (penalty scored)

USF Soccer Stadium, Tampa, Florida
Attendance: 3,925

Team details

Virginia
Santa Clara

== See also ==
- 1991 NCAA Division I women's soccer tournament
- 1991 NCAA Division II men's soccer tournament
- 1991 NCAA Division III men's soccer tournament
- 1991 NAIA men's soccer tournament
