= 2008 NCAA Division I men's soccer tournament =

Men's College Cup (semifinals & final)

Tournament details
- Country: United States
- Teams: 48

Final positions
- Champions: Maryland Terrapins
- Runners-up: North Carolina Tar Heels

Tournament statistics
- Matches played: 47
- Goals scored: 105 (2.23 per match)
- Top goal scorer: Andrew Wiedeman (4)

The 2008 NCAA Division I men's soccer tournament was a tournament of 48 teams from NCAA Division I who played for the NCAA Championship in soccer. The College Cup for the final four teams was held at Pizza Hut Park in Frisco, Texas. All the other games were played at the home field of the higher-seeded team. The final was held on December 14, 2008.

The bracket was announced November 17, 2008. The tournament started on November 21. The first round was played on November 21 and 22, and the second round on the 25th and 26th. The third round was played on November 29 and 30. The Regional Finals were played on December 6. Maryland won the 2008 College Cup, defeating North Carolina, 1–0, in the final. This was Maryland's third College Cup and second since 2005.

== Regional 1 ==
First round
William and Mary (10-6-3)	3
Winthrop (14-5-1)	1
Boston College (9-8-2)	2
Colgate (12-5-3)	0
Duke (10-7-2)	0
UNC Greensboro (8-11-2)	2
Massachusetts (10-7-3)	0
Harvard (11-5-0)	1/2OT

Second round
William and Mary (11-6-3)	0
1	Wake Forest (18-1-1)	1/OT
16	Dartmouth (11-5-1)	0(4)
Boston College (10-8-2)	0(2)
UNC Greensboro (9-11-2)	2/OT
9	Loyola (Md.) (18-1-1)	1
8	South Florida (14-4-2)	2
Harvard (12-5-0)	1

Regional semifinals
1	Wake Forest (19-1-1)	7
16	Dartmouth (11-5-2)	0
UNC Greensboro (10-11-2)	1(1)
8	South Florida (15-4-2)	1(3)

Regional Finals
1	Wake Forest (20-1-1)	5
8	South Florida (15-4-3)	0

== Regional 2 ==
First round
Oakland (14-4-1)	0(3)
Ohio State (9-8-2)	0(4)
Northwestern (13-4-2)	0(4)
Loyola (Ill.) (12-6-3)	0(1)
Louisville (11-7-2)	3
Jacksonville (11-8-1)	4/OT
Ill-Chicago (12-3-4)	0(3)
Dayton (15-4-2)	0(1)

Second round
Ohio State (9-8-3)	0
5	Akron (16-1-4)	1/2OT
12	Notre Dame (12-6-2)	1
Northwestern (13-4-3)	2
Jacksonville (12-8-1)	0
13	North Carolina (11-7-1)	1
4	Michigan State (13-5-1)	0(2)
Ill-Chicago (12-3-5)	0(3)

Regional semifinals
5	Akron (17-1-4)	0
Northwestern (14-4-3)	1
13	North Carolina (12-7-1)	3/OT
Ill-Chicago (12-3-6)	2

Regional Finals
Northwestern (15-4-3)	0
13	North Carolina (13-7-1)	1

== Regional 3 ==
First round
Boston University (11-5-3)	1
Fairleigh Dickinson (13-5-2)	0
UCLA (10-4-6)	0
Cal Poly (10-5-6)	1
UC Davis (12-4-4)	4
Denver (10-6-2)	0
St. Louis (11-4-5)	1/2OT
Drake (13-4-1)	0

Second round
Boston University (12-5-3)	0
3	St. John's (16-2-3)	1
14	UC Irvine (14-1-6)	3
Cal Poly (11-5-6)	0
UC Davis (13-4-4)	1
11	Michigan (12-5-3)	2
6	Indiana (12-6-3)	2
St. Louis (12-4-5)	0

Regional semifinals
3	St. John's (NY) (17-2-3)	3
14	UC Irvine (15-1-6)	2
11	Michigan (13-5-3)	0
6	Indiana (13-6-3)	3

Regional Finals
3	St. John's (NY) (18-2-3)	3/OT
6	Indiana (14-6-3)	2

== Regional 4 ==
First round
Tulsa (15-3-3)	1
UMKC (9-6-3)	0
Connecticut (9-4-6)	1
Fairfield (11-7-0)	0
California (10-3-5)	3
San Francisco (9-9-2)	0
George Mason (13-6-2)	1
Penn (11-2-4)	0

Second round
Tulsa (16-3-3)	1
7	Creighton (14-1-2)	2
10	Virginia (11-8-1)	0
Connecticut (10-4-6)	2
California (11-3-5)	3/2OT
15	UC Santa Barbara (10-6-5)	2
2	Maryland (18-3-0)	2
George Mason (14-6-2)	0

Regional semifinals
7	Creighton (15-1-2)	2/OT
Connecticut (11-4-6)	1
California (12-3-5)	1
2	Maryland (19-3-0)	2

Regional Finals
7	Creighton (16-1-2)	0
2	Maryland (20-3-0)	1

== College Cup – Pizza Hut Park, Frisco, Texas ==
National semifinals December 12
1	Wake Forest (21-1-1)	0
13	North Carolina (14-7-1)	1
3	St. John's (NY) (19-2-3)	0
2	Maryland (21-3-0)	1/2OT

National Championship; December 14
13	North Carolina (15-7-1)	0
2	Maryland (22-3-0)	1

== Schedule ==
Host team, or higher seed, is listed on the Left. Away team or lower seed is listed on the right.

=== First Round ===
2008	v

2008	v

2008	v

2008	v

2008	v

2008	v

2008	v

2008	v

2008	v

2008	v

2008	v

2008	v

2008	v

2008	v

2008	v

2008	v

=== Second Round ===
2008	v

2008	v

2008	v

2008	v

2008	v

2008	v

2008	v

2008	v

2008	v

2008	v

2008	v

2008	v

2008	v

2008	v

2008	v

2008	v

=== Third Round ===
2008	v

2008	v

2008	v

2008	v

2008	v

2008	v

2008	v

2008	v

=== Quarterfinals ===
2008	v

2008	v

2008	v

2008	v

=== Semifinals ===
December 12, 2008	#1 Wake Forest	0-1	#13 North Carolina	Frisco, Texas
5:30pm EST		Report	Shriver 3'	Stadium: Pizza Hut Park; Attendance: 6,134; Referee: Chico Grajeda

December 12, 2008	#2 Maryland	1–0 2OT	St John's	Frisco, Texas
8:00pm EST	Zusi 104'	Report		Stadium: Pizza Hut Park; Attendance: 6,134; Referee: Jorge de la Bandera

=== Championship ===
December 14, 2008	#2 Maryland	1-0	#13 North Carolina	Frisco, Texas
1:00pm EST	Zusi 66'	Report		Stadium: Pizza Hut Park; Attendance: 6,594; Referee: Alex Prus

== Goal scorers ==
**Bold indicates player's team played in the final**

**4 Goals**

Andrew Wiedeman- California

**3 Goals**

**Graham Zusi- Maryland**
Sverre Wegge Gundhus- St. John's
Chris Leer- UC Davis
Nirav Kadam- UNC Greensboro
Cody Arnoux- Wake Forest
Zack Schilawski- Wake Forest

**2 Goals**

Tony Cascio- Connecticut
Seth Sinovic- Creighton
John Mellencamp- Indiana
**Kirk Urso- North Carolina**
Oliver Kupe- Northwestern
Irving Garcia- UC Irvine
Zak Boggs- South Florida
Joel Gustafsson- St. John's
Sam Cronin- Wake Forest
Andrew Hoxie- William and Mary

**1 Goal**

Matt Tutich- Akron
Shawn Chin- Boston College
Edvin Worley- Boston College
Jin Oh- Boston University
Chris Deal- California
Demitrius Omphroy- California
Davis Paul- California
Ryan Anderson- Cal Poly
Dori Arad- Connecticut
Andrei Gotsmanov- Creighton
Chris Schuler- Creighton
Eber Martinez- George Mason
Andre Akpan- Harvard
John Stamatis- Harvard
Baggio Husidic- Illinois-Chicago
Matt Spiess- Illinois-Chicago
Andy Adlard- Indiana
Eric Alexander- Indiana
Kevin Alston- Indiana
Brad Ring- Indiana
Ofori Sarkodie- Indiana
Nedim Hrustric- Jacksonville
Ramak Safi- Jacksonville
Stefan Runeman- Jacksonville
Tony Taylor- Jacksonville
Aaron Clapham- Louisville
Zachary Hernan- Louisville
Ryan McDonald- Louisville
Phil Bannister- Loyola (Md.)
**Jeremy Hall- Maryland**
**Omar Gonzalez- Maryland**
**Casey Townsend- Maryland**
**Rodney Wallace- Maryland**
Peri Marosevic- Michigan
Jake Stacy- Michigan
**Michael Callahan- North Carolina**
**Garry Lewis- North Carolina**
**Billy Schuler- North Carolina**
**Brian Shriver- North Carolina**
Geoff Fallon- Northwestern
Jack Traynor- Notre Dame
Jordan Seabrook- South Florida
Nelson Becerra- St. John's
Tafadzwa Chiduku- St. John's
Kyle Hayes- St. Louis
Austin Neil- Tulsa
Jose Parada- Tulsa
Sule Anibaba- UC Davis
Lance Patterson- UC Davis
Irving Garcia- UC Irvine
Rafael Macedo- UC Irvine
Amani Walker- UC Irvine
Martin Hedevag- UC Santa Barbara
Michael Tetteh- UC Santa Barbara
Tebatso Manyama- UNC Greensboro
Corey Maret- UNC Greensboro
Lyle Adams- Wake Forest
Corben Bone- Wake Forest
Jamie Franks- Wake Forest
Luke Norman- Wake Forest
Marcus Tracy- Wake Forest
Alan Koger- William and Mary
Rafael Araujo- Winthrop

== See also ==
- NCAA men's soccer tournament (disambiguation)
