= Steve Kuntz =

American soccer player

Personal information
- Full name: Steven J. Kuntz
- Date of birth: June 20, 1970 (age 56)
- Place of birth: St. Louis, Missouri, U.S.
- Height: 6 ft 5 in (1.96 m)
- Position: Defender

Youth career
- 1988–1991: St. Louis Billikens

Senior career*
Years	Team	Apps	(Gls)
1993–1999	St. Louis Ambush (indoor)	186	(161)
1994	Milwaukee Rampage		
1995	St. Louis Knights		
- * Club domestic league appearances and goals

Steve Kuntz (born June 20, 1970) is an American retired soccer player who played professionally in the National Professional Soccer League.

== Youth ==
Kuntz was born and grew up in St. Louis. He played for Liebe SC, winning the National U-16 (Niotis Cup) championship in 1985. He attended Saint Louis University, playing on the men's soccer team from 1988 to 1991. He was a 1991 Second Team All American. Kuntz graduated in 1992 with a bachelor's degree in finance. In 1997, St. Louis inducted Kuntz into the Billiken's Athletic Hall of Fame.

== Professional ==
Kuntz began his professional career in 1993 with the St. Louis Ambush of the National Professional Soccer League. He spent six seasons with the Ambush. In 1994, Kuntz spent the outdoor season with the Milwaukee Rampage of the USISL. In 1995, he played for the St. Louis Knights in the USISL Pro League.
