= Santa Clara Broncos men's soccer =

US college soccer team

- Founded: 1967; 58 years ago
- University: Santa Clara University
- Head coach: Cameron Rast (21st season)
- Conference: WCC
- Location: Santa Clara, California
- Stadium: Stevens Stadium (Capacity: 7,000)
- Nickname: Broncos
- Colors: Maroon and white
Home	Away

NCAA Tournament championships
- 1989

NCAA Tournament runner-up
- 1991, 1999

NCAA Tournament College Cup
- 1989, 1991, 1998, 1999, 2003

NCAA Tournament Quarterfinals
- 1978, 1989, 1991, 1995, 1998, 1999, 2003, 2006

NCAA Tournament Round of 16
- 1973, 1978, 1979, 1989, 1991, 1995, 1998, 1999, 2003, 2006, 2007

NCAA Tournament Round of 32
- 1973, 1978, 1979, 1989, 1990, 1991, 1993, 1995, 1996, 1997, 1998, 1999, 2001, 2003, 2005, 2006, 2007, 2015, 2021

NCAA Tournament appearances
- 1973, 1978, 1979, 1989, 1990, 1991, 1993, 1995, 1996, 1997, 1998, 1999, 2001, 2003, 2004, 2005, 2006, 2007, 2010, 2015, 2021

Conference Tournament championships
- 1984

Conference Regular Season championships
- 1989, 1990, 1993, 1994, 1996, 1997, 2001, 2003, 2006, 2007, 2010, 2015, 2021

The Santa Clara Broncos men's soccer program represents Santa Clara University in all NCAA Division I men's college soccer competitions. Founded in 1967, the Broncos compete in the West Coast Conference. The Broncos are coached by Cameron Rast, who has coached the program since 2002.

The men's soccer program has won one NCAA title, which they co-shared with Virginia, in 1989. The program's greatest success came in the 1990s, where they reached the national championship game twice, and reached the College Cup on three occasions.

== Postseason ==
=== NCAA tournament results ===
Santa Clara has appeared in 21 NCAA Tournaments. Their tournament record is 24–17–6

Year	Seed	Round	Opponent	Results
1973	—	Second round	San Francisco	L 0–5
1978	—	Second round Quarterfinals	Washington; San Francisco	W 2–0; L 2–3^{OT}
1979	—	Second round	San Francisco	L 2–3
1989	—	Second round Quarterfinals; College Cup; Final	Fresno State; UCLA; Indiana; Virginia	W 2–1; W 2–0; W 4–2; T 1–1^{4OT}
1990	—	First round	Fresno State	L 1–2
1991	—	First round Second round Quarterfinals; College Cup; Final	Stanford; Fresno State; UCLA; Indiana; Virginia	W 2–1; W 3–0; W 2–1; W 2–0; T 0–0^{L 3–4 PK}
1993	—	First round	San Francisco	L 1–2^{2OT}
1995	—	First round Second round Quarterfinals	San Diego #3 UCLA; Portland	W 4–1^{2OT} W 2–1; L 1–2
1996	—	First round	#1 Washington	L 1–2^{2OT}
1997	—	First round	#5 UCLA	L 0–3
1998	—	First round Second round Quarterfinals; College Cup	SMU; UNCG #5 St. John's #8 Indiana	W 1–0^{OT} W 4–1; W 2–1; L 0–4
1999	—	First round Second round Quarterfinals; College Cup; Final	Stanford #1 Duke; UAB #4 UConn #2 Indiana	T 2–2^{W 6–5 PK} W 4–2; W 3–2^{OT} W 2–1^{4OT} L 0–1
2001	—	First round Second round	California #3 Stanford	W 1–0^{3OT} L 1–3
2003	—	First round Second round Third round Quarterfinals; College Cup	SMU #13 Loyola Marymount; Coastal Carolina #12 Michigan #8 Indiana	T 0–0^{W 3–2 PK} W 1–0^{OT} W 3–2^{OT} W 3–1; L 0–1^{OT}
2004	—	First round	California	L 1–2^{OT}
2005	—	First round Second round	Ohio State #7 California	W 1–0; T 0–0^{L 4–5 PK}
2006	#10	Second round Third round Quarterfinals	Washington #7 Indiana #2 Wake Forest	W 3–2^{OT} T 0–0^{W 5–4 PK} L 1–3
2007	#7	Second round Third round	UCLA #10 Notre Dame	W 3–1; L 0–2
2010	—	First round	Sacramento State	L 1–2
2015	—	First round Second round	Cal State Fullerton #8 Stanford	W 3–0; L 1–3
2021	—	First round Second round	Akron #9 Kentucky	W 2–1^{2OT} L 0–2
