= Richard Davy (footballer) =

Jamaican footballer (born 1953)

Personal information
- Date of birth: April 3, 1953 (age 73)
- Position: Forward

Youth career
- Jamaica College
- Wolmer's Schools

College career
| Years | Team | Apps | (Gls) |
| 1972–1975 | Howard University | | |

Senior career*
| Years | Team | Apps | (Gls) |
- Connecticut Yankees

International career
| | Jamaica MNT | 27 | (11) |
- * Club domestic league appearances and goals

Richard Davy (born May 3, 1953) is a Jamaican former soccer forward who was the architect of the winning goal which catapulted the Howard University Bisons to the 1974 Division 1 National Collegiate Athletic Association (NCAA) Championship. That Howard soccer team posted a perfect 19-0-0 season record, a record which still stands unbeaten and unmatched by any other Collegiate soccer team after over 35 years. Richard's defense-splitting dribbling foray down the left flank, shortly after the start of the fourth overtime in the NCAA Championship game, left two St. Louis University defenders faked-out off of the field as he centered a crossing pass which beat goalkeeper Rob Valero and left teammate Kendu Illodigwe with an easy tap-in into the open goal.

== Early years ==
Prior to taking up a full scholarship to Howard, Richard, while still a schoolboy in the middle of the 1971 Jamaican high school competition, was "pegged" for National duty and scored on his debut with the Jamaica national football team against Haiti to break a three-year goal scoring drought in international competition suffered by the Jamaica National team. That same year, Richard led his Wolmer's Boys High School team to the triple crown of Jamaican High School soccer championships – Manning Cup (corporate area), Walker Cup (corporate area knockout), and Olivier Shield (symbol of all-island schoolboy supremacy) -- a feat which made his school the second in history to do so. Prior to that, Wolmer's had last won the Manning Cup in 1939. Richard went on to represent the Jamaica National football team on 27 occasions scoring 11 goals.

== High school seasons ==
During the 1970 high school season, Richard dismantled the Jamaican high school goal scoring record for a single season with a 23 goal total which lasted as the record for 27 years until it was broken by Kevin "Pele" Wilson. When Richard completed his high school career he had established (1) the single game record (6 goals versus Meadowbrook H.S.), (2) the single season record (23 goals), and (3) the career record of 48 goals. Before transferring to Wolmer's Schools, Richard had won a Manning Cup Championship with Jamaica College High School (JC) in 1968 and thus left the Jamaican high school ranks with the unusual record of having won high school championships four seasons apart and with two different schools.

In 1967, Richard led his JC Colts (Under 14) team to the corporate area championship game where they lost to Excelsior (XLCR) High School.

== College years ==
At Howard, Richard led the team in assists and was the second leading scorer from 1972 to 1975. During this period Howard reached the National Semi-finals three years (1972, 1974, and 1975), played in the Championship game twice (1972 and 1974) winning in 1974, and won fourth place in 1975. the Howard team was on probation in 1973. Richard was selected to the All-American All-South first team for the 1975 season.

== League player ==
After Howard, Richard was drafted by the Connecticut Yankees of the American Soccer League (ASL) and played for several years and for several teams including the Washington D.C.–based Jamaica "Nats" in various leagues (professional and semi-professional) through the 1987 season when he retired from the game. In many of those seasons, Richard's teams went undefeated and he led the league in scoring most of those years.
