= 1999 NCAA Division I men's soccer tournament =

Men's College Cup (semifinals & final)

Tournament details
- Country: United States
- Teams: 32

Final positions
- Champions: Indiana (4th Title)
- Runners-up: Santa Clara Broncos (3rd Title Game)

Tournament statistics
- Matches played: 31
- Goals scored: 101 (3.26 per match)
- Attendance: 70,885 (2,287 per match)
- Top goal scorer(s): Aleksey Korol, Indiana (4)

Awards
- Best player: Yuri Lavrinenko, Indiana (MOP offense); Nick Garcia, Indiana (MOP defense)

The 1999 NCAA Division I men's soccer tournament was the 40th organized men's college soccer tournament by the National Collegiate Athletic Association, to determine the top college soccer team in the United States. The Indiana Hoosiers won their fifth national title by defeating the Santa Clara Broncos in the championship game, 1–0. The semifinal matches on December 10, 1999, and the final match on December 12 were played in Charlotte, North Carolina at Ericsson Stadium. All first, second, and third round matches were played at the home field of the higher seeded team.

== Seeded Teams ==
National seeds
Seed	School	Record
#1	Duke	15–0–3
#2	Indiana	16–3
#3	Saint Louis	16–3–2
#4	Connecticut	16–4
#5	Wake Forest	12–2–5
#6	Virginia	12–8–1
#7	Maryland	14–5
#8	Southwest Missouri State	17–0–3

== Bracket ==
First round November 19–21
1	Duke	4
UMBC	3
Stanford	2(5)
Santa Clara (pen.)	2(6)
SMU (2OT)	2
Creighton	1
UAB	2
8	Missouri State	1
5	Wake Forest	2
VCU	1
North Carolina	1
Furman (2OT)	2
Rutgers	0
Yale (2OT)	1
Hartford	1
4	Connecticut (4OT)	2
3	Saint Louis	3
UIC	2
UCLA	4
San Diego	1
Brown (OT)	2
Rhode Island	1
6	Virginia (3OT)	2
Princeton	1
7	Maryland	0
St. John's (NY)	1
William & Mary	0
Penn State	1
Washington	3
Portland	2
Kentucky	0
2	Indiana (2OT)	1

Second round November 27–28
1	Duke	2
Santa Clara	4
SMU	0
UAB	2
5	Wake Forest	0
Furman	4
Yale	0
4	Connecticut	3
3	Saint Louis	0
UCLA	2
Brown	1
6	Virginia	3
St. John's	1
Penn State (3OT)	2
Washington	0
2	Indiana	2

Quarterfinals; December 5
Santa Clara (OT)	3
UAB	2
Furman	2
4	Connecticut	3
3	UCLA	2
6	Virginia	0
Penn State	0
2	Indiana	3

Semifinals; December 10
Santa Clara (4OT)	2
4	Connecticut	1
UCLA	2
2	Indiana (4OT)	3

Championship; December 12
Santa Clara	0
2	Indiana	1

== Final ==
December 12, 1999

Santa Clara	0–1	Indiana
		Lavrinenko 30'

Ericsson Stadium, Charlotte, North Carolina
Attendance: 15,439
