= 2005 NCAA Division I men's soccer tournament =

Men's College Cup (semifinals & final)

Tournament details
- Country: United States
- Teams: 48

Final positions
- Champions: Maryland (2nd title)
- Runners-up: New Mexico (1st title game)

Tournament statistics
- Matches played: 47
- Attendance: 76,920 (1,637 per match)
- Top goal scorer(s): Paulo da Silva, SMU (5)

Awards
- Best player: Jason Garey, Maryland (MOP offense); Chris Seitz, Maryland (MOP defense)

The 2005 Division I Men's NCAA Division I men's soccer tournament was a tournament of 48 teams from NCAA Division I who played for the NCAA Championship in soccer. The College Cup for the final four teams was held at SAS Soccer Park in Cary, North Carolina. All the other games were played at the home field of the higher-seeded team. The final was held on December 11, 2005, with Maryland defeating New Mexico, 1–0, for the title.

== Regional 1 ==
First round
Brown	2
Rhode Island	1
St. John's	3
Marist	1
West Virginia	1
Robert Morris	0
Yale	1
Stony Brook	2/OT

Second round
Brown	0
1	Maryland	1
16	Dartmouth	0
St. John's (NY)	1
West Virginia	0
9	Akron	5
8	Connecticut	2
Stony Brook	0

Regional semifinals
1	Maryland	3
St. John's (NY)	1
9	Akron	3(4)
8	Connecticut	3(3)

Regional Finals
1	Maryland	1(4)
9	Akron	1(1)

== Regional 2 ==
First round
SMU	2
San Francisco	1
UNC Greensboro	3
James Madison	2
South Florida	3
Stetson	0
Hofstra	0
Providence	1/OT

Second round
SMU	3
5	UCLA	0
12	Virginia Tech	0(3)
UNC Greensboro	0(4)
South Florida	4(6)
13	Virginia	4(7)
4	North Carolina	2
Providence	0

Regional semifinals
SMU	3
UNC Greensboro	1
13	Virginia	1
4	North Carolina	2

Regional Finals
SMU	3/OT
4	North Carolina	2

== Regional 3 ==
First round
Notre Dame	2
Western Illinois	0
Clemson	2
Coastal Carolina	0
Seton Hall	2
Hartwick	1
Creighton	3
Lafayette	0

Second round
Notre Dame	2
3	Indiana	0
14	North Carolina State	0
Clemson	3
Seton Hall	0
11	Penn State	1
6	Duke	1
Creighton	2

Regional semifinals
Notre Dame	0
Clemson	1
11	Penn State	1
Creighton	3

Regional Finals
Clemson	1
Creighton	0

== Regional 4 ==
First round
Santa Clara	1
Ohio State	0
Wake Forest	2
South Carolina	0
UC Santa Barbara	2
San Diego State	0
Bradley	0
Wisconsin-Milwaukee	2

Second round
Santa Clara	0 (4)
7	California	0 (5)
10	Old Dominion	1
Wake Forest	2
UC Santa Barbara	2
15	Cal State Northridge	3
2	New Mexico	2(5)
Wisconsin-Milwaukee	2(4)

Regional semifinals
7	California	3/2OT
Wake Forest	2
15	Cal State Northridge	0
2	New Mexico	1/OT

Regional Finals
7	California	0
2	New Mexico	1

== College Cup – SAS Soccer Park, Cary, North Carolina ==
National semifinals December 9
1	Maryland	4
SMU	1
Clemson	1
2	New Mexico	2

National Championship; December 11
1	Maryland	1
2	New Mexico	0

December 11, 2005
2:00 PM EDT

Maryland	1–0	New Mexico
Burch 30:33'	Report

SAS Soccer Park, Cary, North Carolina
Attendance: 6,922

== See also ==
- NCAA men's soccer tournament (disambiguation)
