= 2001 NCAA Division I men's soccer tournament =

Men's College Cup (semifinals & final)

Tournament details
- Country: United States
- Teams: 48

Final positions
- Champions: North Carolina (1st title)
- Runners-up: Indiana (11th title game)

Tournament statistics
- Matches played: 47
- Goals scored: 111 (2.36 per match)
- Attendance: 63,791 (1,357 per match)
- Top goal scorer(s): Ryan Kneipper, North Carolina (5)

Awards
- Best player: Ryan Kneipper, North Carolina (MOP offense); David Stokes, North Carolina (MOP defense)

The 2001 NCAA Division I men's soccer tournament was the 42nd organized men's college soccer tournament by the National Collegiate Athletic Association, to determine the top college men's soccer team in the United States. North Carolina won its first national title by defeating Indiana 2–0 in the championship game. This was the first tournament to feature an expanded 48-team field although it remained that only the top eight teams were seeded. The final match was played on December 16, 2001, in Columbus, Ohio at Columbus Crew Stadium (now known as Historic Crew Stadium), as were the two semifinal matches on December 14. All first, second, third and fourth round games were played at the home field of the higher seeded team.

== Seeded Teams ==
National seeds
Seed	School	Record
#1	SMU	19–0–0
#2	Virginia	17–1–1
#3	Stanford	16–1–1
#4	Indiana	14–3–1
#5	Clemson	17–4–0
#6	Saint Louis	16–1–0
#7	North Carolina	16–4–0
#8	St. John's	14–2–3

== Bracket ==
=== Regional 1 ===
First round
FIU	0
New Mexico	1
Loyola Marymount	2
UCLA	3
South Florida	2
Akron	1
Massachusetts	1
Creighton	0

Second round
1	SMU	2
New Mexico	0
UCLA	4
San Diego	0
Penn State	1****
South Florida	0
Massachusetts	0
8	St. John's	1

Regional semifinals
1	SMU	1
UCLA	0
Penn State	1
8	St. John's	2***

Regional Finals
1	SMU	0
8	St. John's	2

=== Regional 2 ===
First round
Kentucky	1
Mercer	0
Furman	0
UAB	1*
Rutgers	1
Harvard	0
Butler	1
Michigan State	2

Second round
5	Clemson	1***
Kentucky	0
UAB	3*
South Carolina	2
Connecticut	1
Rutgers	2***
Michigan State	0
4	Indiana	1

Regional semifinals
5	Clemson	3**
UAB	2
Rutgers	0
4	Indiana	3

Regional Finals
5	Clemson	0
4	Indiana	2

=== Regional 3 ===
First round
California	0
Santa Clara	1***
Gonzaga	0
Portland	1
Maryland	1
Notre Dame	0
UMKC	2**
UW Milwaukee	1

Second round
3	Stanford	3
Santa Clara	1
Portland	1
Washington	0
Loyola (MD)	1**
Maryland	0
UMKC	1
6	Saint Louis	2

Regional semifinals
3	Stanford	3
Portland	1
Loyola (MD)	0
6	Saint Louis	3

Regional Finals
3	Stanford	1
6	Saint Louis	0

=== Regional 4 ===
First round
James Madison	1
Towson	4
Ohio State	1
American	2
Boston College	0
Fairleigh Dickinson	1***
Coastal Carolina	1
Seton Hall	2

Second round
7	North Carolina	3
Towson	0
American	3
Wake Forest	0
Princeton	1
Fairleigh Dickinson	2
Seton Hall	1
2	Virginia	0

Regional semifinals
7	North Carolina	1*
American	0
Fairleigh Dickinson	1
Seton Hall	0

Regional Finals
7	North Carolina	3***
Fairleigh Dickinson	2

=== Final Four ===
All matches held at Columbus Crew Stadium:

National semifinals December 14
8	St. John's	1
4	Indiana (2OT)	2
3	Stanford	2
7	North Carolina (4OT)	3

National Championship; December 16
4	Indiana	0
7	North Carolina	2

=== Final ===
December 16, 2001
1:00 PM

Indiana	0–2	North Carolina
	Report	Kneipper 12'; Jackson 75' (pen.)

Columbus Crew Stadium, Columbus, OH
Attendance: 7,113

Team details

Indiana
North Carolina
