= Isaac Cowles =

American soccer player (born 1990)

Personal information
- Full name: Isaac Cowles
- Date of birth: April 18, 1990 (age 36)
- Place of birth: Arvada, Colorado, U.S.
- Height: 6 ft 0 in (1.83 m)
- Position: Defender

College career
Years	Team	Apps	(Gls)
2008–2011	Charlotte 49ers	79	(1)

Senior career*
Years	Team	Apps	(Gls)
2009–2010	Real Colorado Foxes	24	(2)
2011	Carolina Dynamo	12	(0)
2012	Charlotte Eagles	3	(0)
- * Club domestic league appearances and goals as of November 6, 2018

Isaac Cowles (born April 18, 1990) is an American former soccer player who last played with the Charlotte Eagles. He is currently a graphic designer.

== Career ==
Cowles was a four-year starter at the University of North Carolina at Charlotte. With the 49ers, he helped the program reach the final match of the 2011 NCAA Division I Men's Soccer Tournament, where he was named the tournament's defensive Most Outstanding Player. He finished his collegiate career making 79 appearances and scoring one goal.

During the collegiate offseason, Cowles played in USL League Two (then the Premier Development League) with the Real Colorado Foxes and Carolina Dynamo.

Upon graduating from Charlotte, he played one season of professional soccer with the Charlotte Eagles in the now-called USL Championship. Cowles made three appearances with the club.
