= 1998 NCAA Division I men's soccer tournament =

Men's College Cup (semifinals & final)

Tournament details
- Country: United States
- Teams: 32

Final positions
- Champions: Indiana (3rd Title)
- Runners-up: Stanford (1st Title Game)

Tournament statistics
- Matches played: 31
- Goals scored: 93 (3 per match)
- Attendance: 56,078 (1,809 per match)
- Top goal scorer(s): Aleksey Korol, Indiana (6)

Awards
- Best player: Aleksey Korol, Indiana (MOP offense); Nick Garcia, Indiana (MOP defense)

The 1998 NCAA Division I men's soccer tournament was the 39th organized men's college soccer tournament by the National Collegiate Athletic Association, to determine the top college soccer team in the United States. The Indiana Hoosiers won their fourth national title by defeating the Stanford Cardinal in the championship game, 3–1. The final match was played on December 13, 1998, in Richmond, Virginia, at Richmond Stadium for the fourth straight year. All other games were played at the home field of the higher seeded team.

== National seeds ==
National seeds
Seed	School	Record
#1	Clemson	20–1
#2	Virginia	14–3–3
#3	Duke	18–3
#4	Washington	16–3
#5	St. John's (NY)	14–4–3
#6	UCLA	16–3
#7	Cal State Fullerton	14–4–2
#8	Indiana	18–2

== Play-in rounds ==
Lafayette dft. Dayton 1-0

== Early rounds ==
First round
1	Clemson	5
Lafayette	0
William & Mary (2OT)	2
South Florida	1
Cincinnati	0
Butler (2OT)	1
Akron	2
8	Indiana (2OT)	3
5	St. John's (NY) (2OT)	1
Brown	0
Connecticut	0
Penn State	1
SMU	0
Santa Clara (OT)	1
UNC Greensboro	2
4	Washington	1
3	Duke	2
Jacksonville	3
Maryland	2
Richmond	1
Saint Louis	1
Creighton (2OT)	4
Fresno State	1
6	UCLA	2
7	Cal State Fullerton	1
San Diego	2
Stanford (3OT)	3
San Jose State	2
VCU	1
South Carolina	2
Rider	0
2	Virginia	3

Second round
1	Clemson	1
William & Mary	0
Butler	1
8	Indiana (2OT)	2
5	St. John's (NY)	1
Penn State	0
Santa Clara	4
UNC Greensboro	1
Jacksonville	0
Maryland	3
Creighton	2
6	UCLA	0
San Diego	1
Stanford (2OT)	3
South Carolina	0
2	Virginia	1

Third round
1	Clemson	1
8	Indiana	2
5	St. John's (NY)	1
Santa Clara	2
Maryland	3
Creighton	2
Stanford	3
2	Virginia	0

Semifinals
8	Indiana	4
Santa Clara	0
Maryland	0
Stanford	1

Championship; Richmond Stadium; Richmond, Virginia
8	Indiana	3
Stanford	1

== Final ==
December 13, 1998

Indiana	3–1	Stanford

Richmond Stadium, Richmond, Virginia
Attendance: 15,202
