= 1978 NCAA Division I soccer tournament =

1978 College Cup

Tournament details
- Country: United States
- Venue(s): Tampa Stadium; Tampa, Florida
- Teams: 24

Final positions
- Champions: San Francisco (vacated)
- Runners-up: Indiana
- Third place: Clemson
- Fourth place: Philadelphia Textile

Tournament statistics
- Matches played: 24
- Goals scored: 98 (4.08 per match)
- Attendance: 30,533 (1,272 per match)
- Top goal scorer(s): (Nigeria) Thompson Usiyan, Appalachian State (7)

The 1978 NCAA Division I soccer tournament was the 20th annual tournament organized by the National Collegiate Athletic Association to determine the national men's college soccer champion among its Division I members in the United States.

The final match was played at Tampa Stadium in Tampa, Florida on December 10.

San Francisco initially won their fourth national title, defeating Indiana in the final, 2–0. However, the Dons' title would later be vacated by the NCAA and not awarded.

== Qualifying ==
Two teams made their debut appearance in the NCAA Division I soccer tournament: American and La Salle.

== Bracket ==
- S - South region
- NY - New York region
- NE - New England region
- MA - Mid-Atlantic region
- MW - Mid-West region
- FW - Far-West region

seeds

First round
S1	Clemson	4
S4	American	0
S2	Appalachian State	9
S3	George Washington	3
NY1	Adelphi	0
NY4	St. Francis (NY)	1
NY2	Columbia	3
NY3	Hartwick College	2
MA1	Philadelphia Textile	5
MA4	La Salle	1
MA2	Temple	1
MA3	Penn State	0
NE1	Brown	3
NE4	Vermont	1
27	Dartmouth	0
6	Connecticut	4

Second round
S1	Clemson (OT)	2
S2	Appalachian State	1
NY4	St. Francis (NY)	2
NY2	Columbia	0
San Francisco	6
Stanford	3
Santa Clara	2
Washington	0
Philadelphia Textile (OT)	2
Temple	1
Brown	1
Connecticut	3
Indiana	3
Cleveland State	1
Saint Louis	2
SIU Edwardsville (3OT)	3

Quarterfinals
S1	Clemson	4
NY4	St. Francis (NY)	0
San Francisco (OT)	3
Santa Clara	2
Philadelphia Textile	3
Connecticut	0
Indiana	2
SIU Edwardsville	0

Semifinals
Clemson	1
San Francisco	2
Philadelphia Textile	0
Indiana	2

Championship
San Francisco	2
Indiana	0
Third place
Clemson	6
Philadelphia Textile	2

== Championship Rounds ==
=== Final ===
December 10, 1978

San Francisco	2–0	Indiana

Tampa Stadium, Tampa, Florida
Attendance: 8,700
- Championship was later vacated by the NCAA.

== See also ==
- 1978 NCAA Division II Soccer Championship
- 1978 NCAA Division III Soccer Championship
- 1978 NAIA Soccer Championship
