= Mike Huwiler =

American soccer player and coach

Personal information
- Full name: Michael Joseph Huwiler
- Date of birth: January 4, 1972 (age 54)
- Place of birth: Wauwatosa, Wisconsin, United States
- Height: 5 ft 10 in (1.78 m)
- Position: Midfielder

College career
Years	Team	Apps	(Gls)
1990–1992	Virginia Cavaliers		

Senior career*
Years	Team	Apps	(Gls)
1993–1994	Richmond Kickers		
1994–1995	Chicago Power	16	(9)
1995	→ Atlanta Ruckus (loan)	29	(1)
1996	D.C. United	5	(0)
1996	→ Richmond Kickers (loan)		
1997–1998	Milwaukee Rampage	49	(1)
1999–2000	Milwaukee Bavarians		

International career
1992	United States U23		

Managerial career
- 1998–1999: Milwaukee Area Technical College
- 2002–2007: Marquette University High School
- * Club domestic league appearances and goals

Mike "Huey" Huwiler (born January 4, 1972) is an American former soccer midfielder who was a member of the United States Olympic team at the 1992 Summer Olympics and the 1996 D.C. United championship team.

== Playing career ==
=== High school and college ===
Huwiler grew up in Wauwatosa, Wisconsin and attended Marquette University High School where he was a two-time Parade Magazine All American as a high school soccer player. After graduating from high school, Huwiler attended the University of Virginia. He spent three seasons, 1990–1992, on the Caveliers’ soccer team under future national team coach Bruce Arena. In 1991 and 1992, the Caveliers took the NCAA championship. While he considered pursuing a culinary career, he ultimately decided to turn professional with the Richmond Kickers of USISL.

=== Professional ===
In 1993, Huwiler signed with the expansion Richmond Kickers (USISL). He spent two seasons with the Kickers. In 1994, he joined the Chicago Power of the National Professional Soccer League for the 1994–1995 indoor season.

On March 8, 1995, D.C. United of Major League Soccer (MLS) named Huwiler as a Discovery Player. While United signed Huwiler in 1995, MLS did not hold its first season until 1996. In the meantime, the league and United loaned Huwiler to the Atlanta Ruckus of the A-League for the 1995 season. That season, Huwiler was an integral part of the Ruckus team which made it to the A-League championship series only to fall to the Seattle Sounders. In 1996, he joined United for the team, and league's, first season. However, he played only five games before suffering a season-ending injury. On August 19, 1996, United loaned Huwiler to the Richmond Kickers for the remainder of the season, then waived him on November 7, 1996. However, he was on the roster for United's MLS and Open cup championships that season.

On March 25, 1997, he moved to the Milwaukee Rampage (A-League) for the 1997 and 1998 seasons. In 1997, Huwiler added an A-League championship when the Rampage defeated the Carolina Dynamo.

Huwiler retired from playing professionally after the 1998 season. His retirement was precipitated when Carson White of the Raleigh Flyers broke Huwiler's leg in the final game of the season. White was shown straight red for the reckless tackle. He did continue to play amateur ball and in 2000 was a member of the U.S. Amateur Cup championship Milwaukee Bavarians.

=== Olympic team ===
Huwiler was selected for the U.S. team at the 1992 Summer Olympics. The team went 1-1-1 and failed to make the second round. Huwiler was an integral part of the squad, starting all 3 games in Barcelona, and recognized as one of the top performers for the U.S. Team.

== Coaching ==
In 1998, Huwiler joined the coaching ranks when he was hired as the head coach of the Milwaukee Area Technical College men's soccer team. He compiled a 14-7-1 record over his two seasons with the team. In 2002, Marquette University High School hired Huwiler as its junior varsity boys soccer team coach.

== Personal ==
Huwiler and his wife Molly have three children. They reside in his hometown of Milwaukee, Wisconsin and works for M&I Corporation. In July 2003, Huwiler was diagnosed with testicular cancer. After multiple surgeries and aggressive chemotherapy, Huwiler emerged as a cancer survivor.
