= 1979 NCAA Division I soccer tournament =

1979 College Cup

Tournament details
- Country: United States
- Venue(s): Tampa Stadium; Tampa, Florida
- Teams: 19

Final positions
- Champions: SIU Edwardsville (1st title)
- Runners-up: Clemson
- Third place: Penn State
- Fourth place: Columbia

Tournament statistics
- Matches played: 19
- Goals scored: 66 (3.47 per match)
- Attendance: 30,947 (1,629 per match)
- Top goal scorer(s): (Nigeria) Obed Ariri, Clemson (5)

The 1979 NCAA Division I soccer tournament was the 21st annual tournament organized by the National Collegiate Athletic Association to determine the national men's college soccer champion among its Division I members in the United States.

The final match was played at Tampa Stadium in Tampa, Florida on December 9.

SIU Edwardsville won their first Division I national title, defeating Clemson in the final, 3–2.

== Qualifying ==
Three teams made their debut appearance in the NCAA Division I soccer tournament: SMU, South Carolina, and Wisconsin–Milwaukee.

== Bracket ==
First round
Saint Louis	1
SIU Edwardsville	2
Wisconsin–Milwaukee	1
Cleveland State	2
Philadelphia Textile	0
Princeton	1

Second round
San Francisco	3
Santa Clara	2
SMU	0
SIU Edwardsville	2
Indiana	5
Cleveland State	0
Penn State	3
Princeton	1
American	1
Virginia	0
Clemson	1
South Carolina	0
Hartwick College	2
Columbia	3
Connecticut	2
Rhode Island (OT, PK)	3

Quarterfinals
San Francisco	2
SIU Edwardsville	4
Indiana	0
Penn State	2
American	0
Clemson	1
Columbia	5
Rhode Island	1

Semifinals
SIU Edwardsville	2
Penn State	1
Clemson	4
Columbia	1

Championship
SIU Edwardsville	2
Clemson	0
Third place
Penn State	2
Columbia	1

== Championship Rounds ==
=== Final ===
December 9, 1979

SIU Edwardsville	3–2	Clemson
Malloy

Tampa Stadium, Tampa, Florida
Attendance: 5,500

== See also ==
- 1979 NCAA Division II soccer tournament
- 1979 NCAA Division III soccer tournament
- 1979 NAIA soccer championship
