= Jay Nolly =

American soccer player

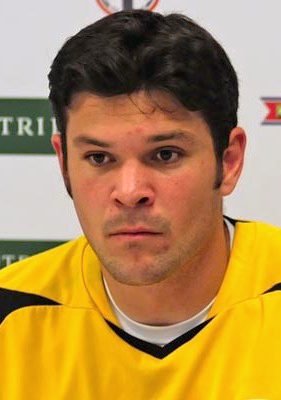

Personal information
- Date of birth: January 2, 1982 (age 44)
- Place of birth: Orlando, Florida, United States
- Height: 6 ft 3 in (1.91 m)
- Position: Goalkeeper

Youth career
- 2000–2004: Indiana Hoosiers

Senior career*
Years	Team	Apps	(Gls)
2005–2006	Real Salt Lake	7	(0)
2007	D.C. United	1	(0)
2008–2010	Vancouver Whitecaps	83	(0)
2011	Vancouver Whitecaps FC	14	(0)
2012	Chicago Fire	0	(0)
- * Club domestic league appearances and goals as of December 5, 2011

Jay Nolly (born January 2, 1982) is an American former professional soccer player who played as a goalkeeper.

== College ==
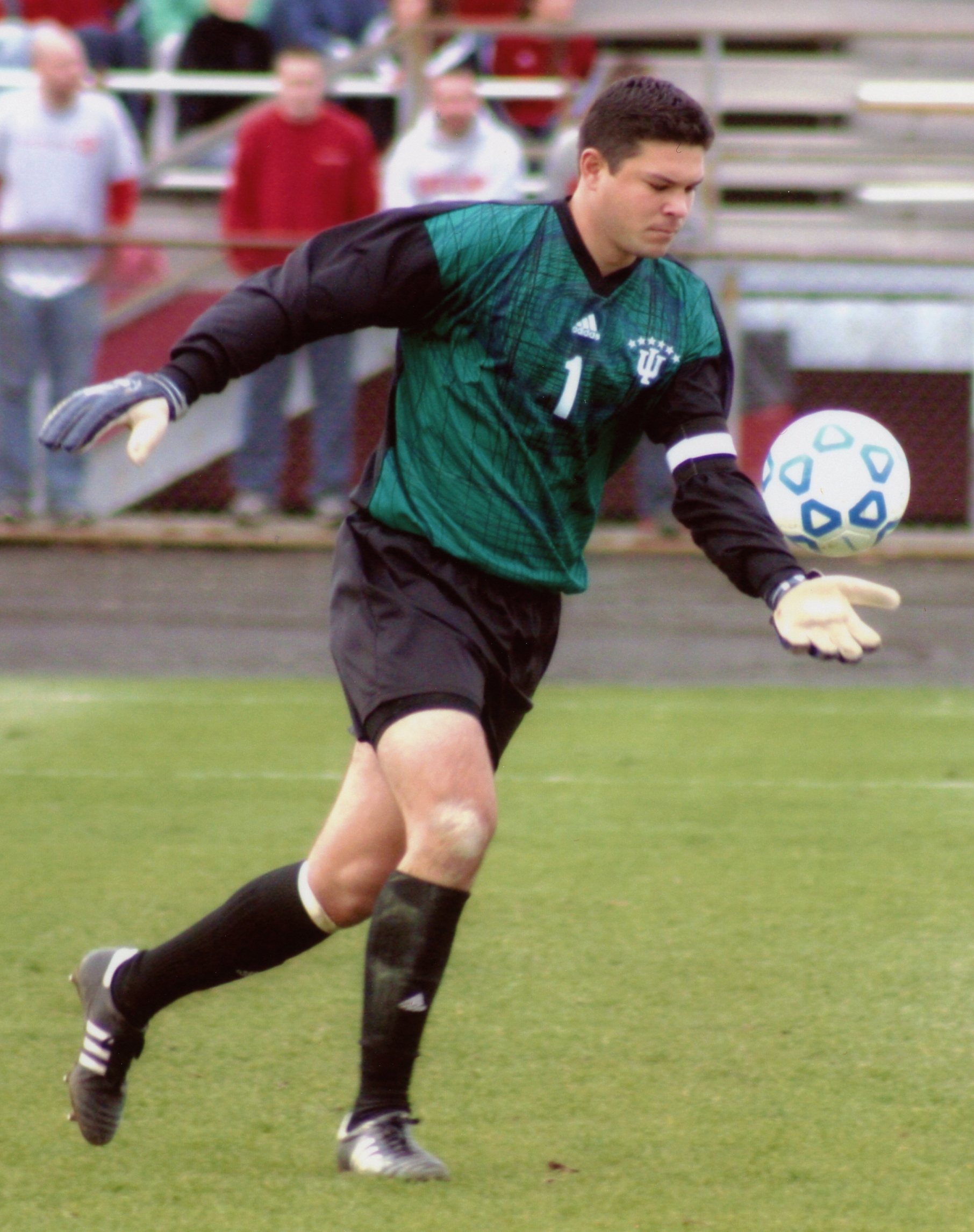
Nolly playing for Indiana University in 2004

Nolly played college soccer at Indiana University where he backstopped the Hoosiers to back-to-back national championships in 2003 and 2004 and was named All-Big Ten in his last three seasons.

== Professional career ==
Real Salt Lake drafted Nolly in the second round of the 2005 MLS SuperDraft and he saw limited action with the team in his rookie season.

After the 2006 season, he was dealt to D.C. United in a deal that involved Freddy Adu and Nick Rimando. He had trials at Celtic FC of Scotland and Dinamo Bucharest of Romania, but eventually signed with United in February 2007. He was later waived by D.C. United in January 2008 to make room for incoming transfers from South America.

He signed with the Vancouver Whitecaps on January 23, 2008. On October 12, 2008, he helped the Whitecaps capture their second USL First Division Championship beating the Puerto Rico Islanders 2–1 in Vancouver On December 16, 2008, the Vancouver Whitecaps announced the re-signing of Nolly for the 2009 season.

On December 5, 2011, Chicago Fire announced they acquired Nolly in exchange for their first round selection in the 2013 MLS Supplemental Draft.

After the conclusion of the 2012 season, Chicago declined the 2013 option on Nolly's contract and he entered the 2012 MLS Re-Entry Draft. Nolly went undrafted and became a free agent.

== Honors ==
=== Vancouver Whitecaps ===
- USL First Division Championship: 2008

=== Indiana University ===
- NCAA Men's Division I Soccer Championship: 2003 2004

=== Individual ===
- USSF D-2 Pro League Goalkeeper of the Year: 2010
- USSF D-2 Pro League Best XI: 2010
