= Seth George =

American soccer player

Personal information
- Full name: Seth George
- Date of birth: March 30, 1976 (age 50)
- Place of birth: Mission Viejo, California, U.S.
- Height: 6 ft 0 in (1.83 m)
- Position: Forward

Youth career
- 1995–1998: UCLA Bruins

Senior career*
Years	Team	Apps	(Gls)
1999	1860 Munich II	0	(0)
1999–2000	Los Angeles Galaxy	23	(3)
1999	→ MLS Pro 40 (loan)	2	(2)
1999	→ Orange County Zodiac (loan)	3	(0)
2000	→ Orange County Zodiac (loan)	4	(1)
2001	Chicago Fire	0	(0)
- * Club domestic league appearances and goals

Seth George (born March 30, 1976) is an American retired soccer player who spent three seasons in Major League Soccer.

== Career ==
=== Youth ===
George had an outstanding youth soccer career, beginning with his club team, Huntington Beach Futbol Club. In 1992, George and his team mates won the U.S. U-16 national championship, the DJ Niotis Cup. He then played soccer at Santa Margarita High School in Rancho Santa Margarita, California. In 1995, he was the Orange County Offensive MVP.

In 1995, he entered college at UCLA, and played four seasons with the men's soccer team. In 1997 the Bruins went to the NCAA Men's Soccer Championship game against the Virginia Cavaliers. George scored both goals in the UCLA's 2–0 victory. He was named the tournament's offensive MVP and was selected as a second team All American. In 1998, he was named a first team All American, ending his college career in 1998 with 49 goals in 86 games.

=== Professional ===
In 1999, George was drafted in the first round of the United Soccer League's draft by the San Diego Flash, and was also drafted by the Los Angeles Galaxy in the second round (thirteenth overall) of the 1999 MLS College Draft. George chose not to sign with either team, and instead moved to Europe, signing a contract with 1860 Munich in the Bundesliga. When it became apparent that he would not find first team playing time in Germany, George returned to the United States and signed with Galaxy. Over two seasons, he appeared in twenty-three games, most as a late game substitute. In 2000, he went on loan with the Orange County Zodiac with the USL A-League. The Galaxy waived him on November 2, 2000. A few days later, the Chicago Fire selected George in the waiver draft, but he never played a league game with them, and retired at the end of the 2001 season.

=== Post-Retirement ===
Since retiring from professional competition, George has continued to play on an amateur and semi-professional basis. In 2005, he was the team MVP for the Phoenix Croatians.
