= Art Napolitano =

American soccer player

Personal information
- Date of birth: January 7, 1956 (age 70)
- Place of birth: Mobile, Alabama, U.S.
- Height: 5 ft 10 in (1.78 m)
- Positions: Forward; defender

Youth career
- 1974–1977: Hartwick College

Senior career*
Years	Team	Apps	(Gls)
1978	Houston Hurricane	8	(0)
1978–1980	Pittsburgh Spirit (indoor)	46	(9)
19791980	Pennsylvania Stoners		
1980–1981	Hartford Hellions (indoor)	24	(1)
1981–1982	Philadelphia Fever (indoor)	9	(2)
- * Club domestic league appearances and goals

Art Napolitano (born January 7, 1956) is an American retired soccer player who played professionally in the North American Soccer League, American Soccer League and Major Indoor Soccer League.

Raised in Hamilton Township, Mercer County, New Jersey, Napolitano graduated in 1974 from Steinert High School, where he was part of two state champion soccer teams.

Napolitano attended Hartwick College where he played on the men's soccer team from 1974 to 1977. His senior season, the Hawks won the NCAA Men's Division I Soccer Championship with Napolitano scoring one of the goals of the game.Steve long scored the winning goal. He turned professional in 1978 with the Houston Hurricane of the North American Soccer League. That fall, he moved to the Pittsburgh Spirit of the Major Indoor Soccer League. He spent two seasons in Pittsburgh. In the summer of 1980, he played for the Pennsylvania Stoners of the American Soccer League. He then returned to the indoor game, this time with the Hartford Hellions before finishing his career with the Philadelphia Fever.
