= 1993 NCAA Division I men's soccer tournament =

1993 Men's College Cup

Tournament details
- Country: United States
- Venue(s): Richardson Stadium; Davidson, North Carolina
- Teams: 32

Final positions
- Champions: Virginia (4th title)
- Runners-up: South Carolina
- Semifinalists: Cal State Fullerton; Princeton

Tournament statistics
- Matches played: 31
- Goals scored: 97 (3.13 per match)
- Attendance: 72,175 (2,328 per match)
- Top goal scorer(s): Nate Friends, Virginia (3); Andre Parris, Princeton (5)

Awards
- Best player: Nate Friends, Virginia (offensive); Brian Bates, Virginia (defensive)

The 1993 NCAA Division I men's soccer tournament was the 35th annual tournament organized by the National Collegiate Athletic Association to determine the national champion of men's collegiate soccer among its Division I members in the United States.

Two-time defending champions Virginia defeated South Carolina in the championship game, 2–0, to claim their third consecutive and fourth overall national title.

The final match was played on December 5 at Richardson Stadium on the campus of Davidson College in Davidson, North Carolina. All other games were played at the home field of the higher seeded team.

== Qualifying ==
Three teams made their debut appearances in the NCAA Division I men's soccer tournament: Memphis, Robert Morris, and UNC Greensboro.

== Bracket ==
First round
Memphis	0
Indiana	6
Notre Dame	1
Wisconsin	2
James Madison	0
Loyola Maryland	1
William & Mary	1
Virginia	2
Robert Morris	0
Penn State	3
Columbia	0
Princeton	2
Rutgers	0
Hartwick	2
Boston University	2
St. John's (NY)	1
San Diego (2OT)	4
UCLA	2
Cal State Fullerton	4
Fresno State	0
San Francisco (2OT)	2
Santa Clara	1
Saint Louis (pen.)	0
Portland	0
Air Force (4OT)	2
Creighton	1
Duke	2
North Carolina	3
UNC Greensboro	0
Clemson	2
Furman	0
South Carolina	1

Second round
Indiana	0
Wisconsin	1
Loyola Maryland	1
Virginia	2
Penn State	2
Princeton	5
Hartwick (OT)	2
Boston University	1
San Diego	2
Cal State Fullerton	3
San Francisco	2
Saint Louis	1
Air Force	2
North Carolina	1
Clemson	2
South Carolina	3

Quarterfinals
Wisconsin	0
Virginia	3
Princeton	3
Hartwick	0
Cal State Fullerton	1
San Francisco	0
Air Force	0
South Carolina	6

Semifinals
Virginia	3
Princeton	1
Cal State Fullerton	0
South Carolina	1

Championship
Virginia	2
South Carolina	0

== Final ==
December 5, 1993

Virginia	2–0	South Carolina
Friends 39', 85'	Report

Richardson Stadium, Davidson, NC
Attendance: 10,549

Team details

Virginia
South Carolina

== See also ==
- 1993 NCAA Division I women's soccer tournament
- 1993 NCAA Division II men's soccer tournament
- 1993 NCAA Division III men's soccer tournament
- 1993 NAIA men's soccer tournament
