= NCAA men's soccer tournament =

The NCAA Men's Soccer Championship refers to one of three championships in men's soccer organized by the National Collegiate Athletic Association (NCAA):

- NCAA Division I men's soccer tournament
- NCAA Division II men's soccer tournament
- NCAA Division III men's soccer tournament
