= Danny Jackson (footballer) =

English footballer

Personal information
- Date of birth: 20 October 1979 (age 47)
- Place of birth: Leeds, West Yorkshire, England
- Position: Defender

Youth career
- 1988–1998: Leeds United
- 1998–2001: University of North Carolina

Senior career*
Years	Team	Apps	(Gls)
2002	Colorado Rapids	1	(0)
2003–2008	Seattle Sounders	113	(2)
- * Club domestic league appearances and goals

Danny Jackson (born 20 October 1979) is an English central defender/sweeper who last played for the Seattle Sounders, and served as captain from 2004 to 2008.

== Youth ==
In England, Jackson began playing football through the Leeds United Youth Program. After 10 years in the program, Jackson headed to the United States to play college soccer at the University of North Carolina where he received numerous honors. As a Tarheel, he was nominated for the All-South Team from 1998 to 2001, he was All-ACC and All-American in 2000 and 2001. Jackson was the team captain for three years including the 2001 season when the Tar Heels won the NCAA Division I National Championship over Indiana University and was named Soccer America MVP, National Championship MVP and was voted to the Final Four All Tournament Team. At UNC he was also the 2001 Patterson Medal Recipient as the outstanding student athlete at UNC.

== Professional ==
After a successful college career, Jackson joined the Colorado Rapids of MLS for the 2002 season, and he appeared in one league match. On 17 March 2003, the Rapids waived Jackson and he signed with the USL First Division Seattle Sounders. Jackson was voted the Sounders' Defender of the Year, as well A-League.com's Defender of the Year and was selected to the A-League First-Team.

== Broadcasting ==
In 2023, Jackson became the play-by-play radio commentator for Seattle Sounders FC, the successor to the Sounders who play in Major League Soccer.

== Honors ==
=== Seattle Sounders ===
- USL First Division Championship (1): 2007
- USL First Division Commissioner's Cup (1): 2007
