= Peter Arnautoff =

American soccer player (born 1951)

Personal information
- Date of birth: December 29, 1951 (age 74)
- Place of birth: Oakland, California, U.S.
- Height: 6 ft 2 in (1.88 m)
- Position: Goalkeeper

College career
Years	Team	Apps	(Gls)
1975–1978	San Francisco Dons		

Senior career*
Years	Team	Apps	(Gls)
1979	Edmonton Drillers	1	(0)
1979–1981	Philadelphia Fever (indoor)	6	(0)
1980	Philadelphia Fury	4	(0)
- * Club domestic league appearances and goals

Peter Arnautoff (born December 29, 1951) was an American soccer goalkeeper who played professionally in the North American Soccer League and Major Indoor Soccer League.

Arnautoff was born in Oakland, California, and attended the University of San Francisco where he played on the men's soccer team from 1975 to 1978. He won the 1975, 1976 and 1978 NCAA Men's Division I Soccer Championship with the Dons. In the 1976 tournament, he posted shutouts in each game. Arnautoff was subsequently inducted into the USF Hall of Fame and has been named a USF Legend of the Hilltop. In 1979, he signed with the Edmonton Drillers of the North American Soccer League. He then played the 1980 season with the Philadelphia Fury. He also played two seasons with the Philadelphia Fever of the Major Indoor Soccer League. He was a member of the San Francisco Fire Department.

Arnautoff was selected for the 1980 U.S. Olympic team, but did not get to play any games due to the United States boycott of the 1980 Moscow Games. The Moscow Games were the first to be held in Eastern Europe and were boycotted by the US and a number of other countries in reaction to the Soviet invasion in Afghanistan the year prior.

Victor Arnautoff, Russian-American painter and professor of art, is Peter's grandfather.
