= Yuri Lavrynenko =

Ukrainian footballer

Yuriy Lavrynenko
Personal information
- Date of birth: June 12, 1977 (age 49)
- Place of birth: Kyiv, Ukraine
- Height: 6 ft 0 in (1.83 m)
- Position: Midfielder

Youth career
- 1985–1992: Dynamo Kyiv
- 1992–1995: Gates Chili Spartans

College career
Years	Team	Apps	(Gls)
1996–1999	Indiana Hoosiers		

Senior career*
Years	Team	Apps	(Gls)
2000	Chicago Fire	3	(0)
2000	→ Indiana Blast (loan)	2	(0)
2000	→ MLS Project 40 (loan)	3	(0)
2000	→ Milwaukee Rampage (loan)	13	(4)
2001	Milwaukee Rampage	10	(0)
2002–2003	Rochester Rhinos	38	(3)
2004	Montreal Impact	11	(1)
Total		80	(8)

Managerial career
- 2009–: RIT Tigers (asst.)
- * Club domestic league appearances and goals

Yuriy Lavrynenko is a Ukrainian retired association football midfielder who played professionally in the USL First Division and Major League Soccer. Lavrynenko is currently the associate head coach for the RIT Tigers men's team.

== Player ==
=== Youth ===
Lavrynenko began playing in the Dynamo Kyiv youth system when he was seven. In 1991, Lavrynenko's youth team played in a tournament in Rochester, New York. Several players were invited to move to Rochester. In 1992, Lavrynenko took the offer and moved to Chili, New York. During his four years attending Gates-Chili High School, he was an All State soccer player on a team which was the 1995 New York high school co-champion. Lavrynenko attended Indiana University, playing on the men's soccer team from 1996 to 1999. In both 1998 and 1999, Lavrynenko scored the game-winning goal as the Hoosiers took back to back NCAA Division I Men's Soccer Championships. He was a 1999 NCAA All American.

=== Professional ===
In February 2000, the Chicago Fire selected Lavrynenko in the third round (thirty-second overall) of the 2000 MLS SuperDraft. During the 2000 season, he played three games with the Fire, going on loan to MLS Project 40, the Indiana Blast and the Milwaukee Rampage, all playing in the USL A-League. When the Fire released him during the 2001 pre-season, the Rampage signed him to a three-year contract. The Rampage released him at the end of the season and in 2002, he joined the Rochester Rhinos. On June 25, 2004, the Rhinos released Lavrynenko. The Montreal Impact signed him two weeks later. He finished the season in Montreal, then retired.

== Coach ==
In July 2009, Rochester Institute of Technology hired Lavrynenko as an assistant coach.
