= Andy Atuegbu =

Nigerian footballer

Personal information
- Date of birth: February 4, 1952 (age 74)
- Place of birth: Jos, Nigeria
- Position: Midfielder

College career
Years	Team	Apps	(Gls)
1974–1977	San Francisco Dons		

Senior career*
Years	Team	Apps	(Gls)
1978	Oakland Stompers	26	(0)
1979	Edmonton Drillers	29	(3)
1979–1980	Hartford Hellions (indoor)	23	(6)
1980–1981	San Francisco Fog (indoor)	39	(25)
- Greek-American A.C.
- * Club domestic league appearances and goals

Andy Atuegbu (ah-two-ay-boo) is a retired Nigerian football midfielder.

== Career ==
Atuegbu was a star midfielder for the University of San Francisco from 1974 to 1977. The Dons won the NCAA championship two of Atuegbu's four seasons with the team, 1975 and 1976. His outstanding play led to his selection as a first team All American in 1976. He also earned second team All American recognition in 1975 and 1977. His 1976 NCAA championship with the Dons was complemented with a National Challenge Cup title while playing for SFAC. He scored the winning goal in the final against Inter-Giuliana.

The Oakland Stompers of the North American Soccer League (NASL) drafted Atuegbu in 1978 and he spent that season with the Stompers. The team folded at the end of the 1978 season and Atuegbu moved to the Edmonton Drillers for the 1979 NASL season. In the fall of 1979, he signed with the Hartford Hellions of the Major Indoor Soccer League. After one season, he moved to the San Francisco Fog where he played the 1980–1981 season. He later played for the amateur Greek-American A.C. when it won the 1985 U.S. Open Cup.

Soccer America Magazine named Atuegbu to their College Team of the Century.

While retired from professional soccer, Atuegbu continues to play for fun.
