= John Young (footballer, born 1957) =

Scottish footballer

Personal information
- Date of birth: 19 September 1957
- Place of birth: Edinburgh, Scotland
- Date of death: 2017 (age 59)
- Position: Midfielder

Youth career
- -1976: Links B.C.
- 1977–1979: Hartwick College

Senior career*
Years	Team	Apps	(Gls)
1976-1977	Meadowbank Thistle	26	(7)
1980–1981	Denver Avalanche (indoor)	7	(1)
- * Club domestic league appearances and goals

John Young is a Scottish retired association football midfielder who played professionally in the Major Indoor Soccer League and in the Scottish Football League for Meadowbank Thistle.

Young played his youth football with Links Boys Club in Edinhurgh, playing for Scotland at under-16 level, before joining up with Meadowbank Thistle. He played 26 games, scoring seven goals, before he was offered a scholarship at Hartwick College, where he played from 1977 to 1979. In his freshman season, he was part of the Hawks' NCAA Men's Division I Soccer Championship and Young was selected as the Final Four's Offensive MVP. He was a 1979 First Team All American.

He played for the Denver Avalanche of the Major Indoor Soccer League during the 1980–1981 season.
