= Aleksey Korol =

Ukrainian soccer forward and coach (born 1977)

Personal information
- Date of birth: 14 October 1977 (age 49)
- Place of birth: Kiev, Ukrainian SSR, Soviet Union (now Kyiv, Ukraine)
- Height: 5 ft 10 in (1.78 m)
- Position: Forward

Youth career
- Dynamo Kyiv

College career
Years	Team	Apps	(Gls)
1996–1999	Indiana Hoosiers		

Senior career*
Years	Team	Apps	(Gls)
1997	Kalamazoo Kingdom		
2000–2001	Dallas Burn	39	(7)
2001	→ Atlanta Silverbacks (loan)	1	(0)
2002	Chicago Fire	1	(0)
2002	Rochester Raging Rhinos	2	(0)
2002	Indiana Blast	1	(0)
2003–2004	Pittsburgh Riverhounds	23	(4)
2004	Charleston Battery	9	(0)
2004	Harrisburg City Islanders	12	(2)

Managerial career
- 2006–2008: UIC Flames (assistant)
- 2009: Indiana Hoosiers (assistant)
- 2010–: UIC Flames (assistant)
- * Club domestic league appearances and goals

Aleksey Korol (Note: Ukrainian: Олексій Король, romanized: Oleksii Korol) (born October 14, 1977) is a former Ukrainian professional footballer and coach who has spent most of his career in the United States.

== Player ==
Born in Kyiv, Korol played both hockey and soccer growing up in Ukraine. As a youth player, he signed with Dynamo Kyiv. His family sent him to the United States when he was 14 where he settled in Livonia, New York. While playing for Livonia Central High School Korol scored 132 goals, the all-time record for a player in Section V (greater Rochester area) of the New York State Public High School Athletic Association. Later on, his record was tied by Jordan Chirico of Livonia Central High. Korol lived with the Chirico family in Livonia.

=== College ===
In 1996, he enrolled at Indiana University. While at Indiana, he spent four seasons on the men's soccer team. He scored 57 goals and assisted on 35 during his career with the Hoosiers. In 1998 and 1999, he was part of the Indiana teams which took the NCAA championship titles. Both years he led the tournament in scoring (6 goals in 1998 and 4 in 1999). In 1999, Korol as selected as a first team All American and the SoccerAmerica Player of the Year. While with Indiana, Korol spent the 1997 collegiate off season with the Kalamazoo Kingdom of the USL Premier Development League.

=== Professional ===
The Dallas Burn of Major League Soccer selected Korol with the fifth pick in the 2000 MLS SuperDraft. In his first year with the Burn, he scored five goals and assisted on three others. While with Dallas, he appeared in one game with the Atlanta Silverbacks.

On 15 January 2002, the Chicago Fire acquired Korol and Miguel Saavedra from the Burn for the Fire's 2002 sixth-round draft pick. However, injuries to his left knee which resulted in bursitis led to his playing in only one game. When the Fire waived him, Korol signed with the Rochester Raging Rhinos on 26 July 2002. He appeared in two games with them before moving to the Indiana Blast for one game. In 2003, he moved to the Pittsburgh Riverhounds of USL-2. On 19 September 2003, the Kansas City Comets of Major Indoor Soccer League signed Korol to a one-year contract, with an option for one more. Korol played in nine games for the Comets as he was again hampered with injuries. The Comets waived him on 27 January 2004. On 12 February 2004, Korol signed with the Charleston Battery of USL-1. In June, the Battery released Korol and he signed with the Harrisburg City Islanders of USL-2 on 12 July 2004, in time for the playoffs.

The Rockford Thunder of the American Indoor Soccer League signed Korol in January 2007 and he spent the 2006–2007 AISL season with the Thunder.

== Coach ==
In April 2006, Korol became an assistant coach at the University of Illinois at Chicago. Korol has also coached youth soccer with Chicago Lakefront SC.

In February 2009, Korol was named an assistant coach at his alma mater. His hiring came less than two months after former assistant coach Todd Yeagley left Indiana University to take over head coaching duties at the University of Wisconsin. 2010 Korol returned to UIC as the first assistant. He currently holds this position.
