= 2003 NCAA Division I men's soccer tournament =

Men's College Cup (semifinals & final)

Tournament details
- Country: United States
- Teams: 48

Final positions
- Champions: Indiana (6th title)
- Runners-up: St. John's (NY) (2nd title game)

Tournament statistics
- Matches played: 47
- Attendance: 61,310 (1,304 per match)
- Top goal scorer(s): Joseph Ngwenya, Coastal Carolina (5)

Awards
- Best player: Jacob Peterson, Indiana (MOP offense); Jay Nolly, Indiana (MOP defense)

2003 NCAA Division I men's soccer tournament was a tournament of 48 teams from NCAA Division I across the nation who played for the NCAA Championship. This year's College Cup Final Four was held at Columbus Crew Stadium in Columbus, Ohio. All the other games were played at the home field of the higher seeded. The final was held on December 14, 2003. St. John's, Maryland, Santa Clara, and Indiana qualified for the Final Four. St. John's defeated Maryland, and Indiana beat Santa Clara. In the final Indiana defeated St. John's, 2–1.

The tournament started on November 21, 2003. The first round was played on November 21 and 22. The second round on the November 26, and the third round on the November 29–30. The Regional Finals were played on December 5–7.

== Seeded Teams ==
2003 College Cup
Seed	School	Record
#1	UCLA	18–1–1
#2	Maryland	17–2–1
#3	Wake Forest	15–4–0
#4	North Carolina	12–3–4
#5	Notre Dame	15–3–3
#6	St. John's	14–5–2
#7	Saint Louis	13–3–3
#8	Indiana	12–3–5
#9	VCU	16–4–0
#10	Washington	12–4–2
#11	UC Santa Barbara	15–4–1
#12	Michigan	13–6–0
#13	Loyola Marymount	12–6–1
#14	San Diego	12-4-3
#15	Akron	14–4–2
#16	Cal St. Northridge	14–3–2

== Regional 1 ==
First round
Oakland	2
Tulsa	3
UCF	1
Florida International	3
Virginia Tech	3/pk
Clemson	3
Cincinnati	0
Kentucky	0/pk

Second round
Tulsa	2
1	UCLA	3
16	Cal St. Northridge	1
Florida International	1/pk
Virginia Tech	2
9	VCU	5
8	Indiana	2/2ot
Kentucky	1

Regional semifinals
1	UCLA	2
Florida International	0
9	VCU	0
8	Indiana	5

Regional Finals
1	UCLA	1
8	Indiana	2

== Regional 2 ==
First round
Wisconsin-Milwaukee	4
Western Michigan	1
St. Peter's	2
Brown	0
Santa Clara	1/pk
SMU	1
Davidson	0
Coastal Carolina	3

Second round
Wisconsin-Milwaukee	1
5	Notre Dame	4
12	Michigan	6
St. Peter's	2
Santa Clara	1/ot
13	Loyola Marymount	0
4	North Carolina	0
Coastal Carolina	3

Regional semifinals
5	Notre Dame	1
12	Michigan	1/pk
Santa Clara	3(ot)
Coastal Carolina	2

Regional Finals
12	Michigan	1
Santa Clara	3

== Regional 3 ==
First round
Virginia	2
Seton Hall	0
UMKC	0
Creighton	6
California	2
San Jose State	0
Rhode Island	0
Connecticut	3

Second round
Virginia	2
3	Wake Forest	0
14	San Diego	1
Creighton	1/pk
California	0
11	UC Santa Barbara	2
6	St. John's	0/pk
Connecticut	0

Regional semifinals
Virginia	1
Creighton	3
11	UC Santa Barbara	2
6	St. John's	3/2ot

Regional Finals
Creighton	2
6	St. John's	3

== Regional 4 ==
First round
Fairleigh Dickinson	0
Binghamton	1
Portland	3
Oregon State	2
Rutgers	3
Lafayette	1
North Carolina State	3
Old Dominion	6

Second round
Binghamton	0
7	Saint Louis	1/ot
10	Washington	1
Portland	0
Rutgers	2
15	Akron	3
2	Maryland	2
Old Dominion	1

Regional semifinals
7	Saint Louis	3(ot)
10	Washington	2
15	Akron	0
2	Maryland	1

Regional Finals
7	Saint Louis	2
2	Maryland	4

== Final Four – Columbus Crew Stadium, Columbus, Ohio ==
National semifinals December 12
8	Indiana	1(2ot)
Santa Clara	0
6	St. John's	1
2	Maryland	0

National Championship; December 14
8	Indiana	2
6	St. John's	1

December 14, 2003

St. John's Red Storm	1–2 (a.e.t.)	Indiana
Kozicki 79'	Report	Grabavoy 15:05'; Peterson 19:10'

Columbus Crew Stadium, Columbus, Ohio
Attendance: 5,300
