= NCAA Division I men's soccer tournament cumulative results =

The following is a list of the top team performances during the National Collegiate Athletic Association (NCAA) Division I college soccer NCAA Division I Men's Soccer Championship as of May 2021 with teams listed by number of championships, second-place finishes, and semifinal finishes. Third place matches were only held between 1974 and 1979.

All schools are listed by their current athletic brand names, which do not always match the names under which they competed in a specific tournament.

== Cumulative results ==
Team	Championships	Runners-up	Third-place/Semi-Finals	Fourth-place
Saint Louis	10 (1959, 1960, 1962, 1963, 1965, 1967, 1969, 1970, 1972, 1973)	3 (1961, 1971, 1974)	4 (1964, 1991, 1997, 2025)	–
Indiana	8 (1982, 1983, 1988, 1998, 1999, 2003, 2004, 2012)	9 (1976, 1978, 1980, 1984, 1994, 2001, 2017, 2020, 2022)	5 (1989, 1991, 1997, 2000, 2018)	–
Virginia	7 (1989, 1991, 1992, 1993, 1994, 2009, 2014)	2 (1997, 2019)	4 (1983, 1995, 2006, 2013)	–
UCLA	4 (1985, 1990, 1997, 2002)	5 (1970, 1972, 1973, 2006, 2014)	4 (1984, 1994, 1999, 2011)	1 (1974)
Maryland	4 (1968, 2005, 2008, 2018)	3 (1960, 1962, 2013)	7 (1963, 1969, 1998, 2002, 2003, 2004, 2012)	–
San Francisco	4 (1966, 1975, 1976, 1980) (1978 Vacated by NCAA)	2 (1969, 1977)	1 (1971)	-
Stanford	3 (2015, 2016, 2017)	2 (1998, 2002)	2 (2001, 2019)	–
Clemson	4 (1984, 1987, 2021, 2023)	2 (1979, 2015)	3 (1973, 1978, 2005)	1 (1976)
Michigan State	2 (1967, 1968)	2 (1964, 1965)	3 (1962, 1966, 2018)	–
North Carolina	2 (2001, 2011)	1 (2008)	6 (1987, 2009, 2010, 2016, 2017, 2020)	–
UConn	2 (1981, 2000)	–	4 (1960, 1982, 1983, 1999)	–
Akron	1 (2010)	3 (1986, 2009, 2018)	2 (2015, 2017)	–
Santa Clara	1 (1989)	2 (1991, 1999)	2 (1998, 2003)	–
Duke	1 (1986)	2 (1982, 1995)	2 (1992, 2004)	–
Wake Forest	1 (2007)	1 (2016)	4 (2006, 2008, 2009, 2019)	–
SIU Edwardsville	1 (1979)	1 (1975)	2 (1977, 1982)	–
Navy	1 (1964)	1 (1963)	2 (1965, 1967)	–
Howard	1 (1974) (1971 Vacated by NCAA)	1 (1988)	1 (1972) (1970 Vacated by NCAA)	1 (1975)
Georgetown	1 (2019)	1 (2012)	1 (2021)	–
Notre Dame	1 (2013)	1 (2023)	1 (2021)	–
Washington	1 (2025)	1 (2021)	–	-
Marshall	1 (2020)	1 (2024)	–	–
UC Santa Barbara	1 (2006)	1 (2004)	–	–
Hartwick College	1 (1977)	–	6 (1970, 1974, 1976, 1980, 1984, 1985)	–
St. John's	1 (1996)	–	2 (2001, 2008)	–
West Chester	1 (1961)	–	2 (1959, 1960)	–
Syracuse	1 (2022)	–	1 (2015)	–
Vermont	1 (2024)	–	–	–
Wisconsin	1 (1995)	–	–	–
Creighton	–	1 (2000)	5 (1996, 2002, 2011, 2012, 2022)	–
Rutgers	–	1 (1990)	3 (1961, 1989, 1994)	–
NC State	–	1 (2025)	1 (1990)	–
Charlotte	–	1 (2011)	1 (1996)	–
Ohio State	–	1 (2007)	1 (2024)	–
New Mexico	–	1 (2005)	1 (2013)	–
South Carolina	–	1 (1993)	1 (1988)	–
Alabama A&M (Note: Alabama A&M dropped soccer after the 2011 season.)	–	1 (1981)	1 (1980)	–
LIU (Note: At the time LIU made its College Cup appearances, it represented only the Brooklyn campus of Long Island University, competing as the LIU Blackbirds (later LIU Brooklyn Blackbirds). In 2019, LIU merged the Brooklyn athletic program with the NCAA Division II program of its Post campus, creating a new D-I athletic program that now competes as the LIU Sharks. The merged LIU men's soccer program inherited the history and records of the Brooklyn program.)	–	1 (1966)	1 (1967)	–
Bridgeport	–	1 (1959)	1 (1961)	–
Columbia	–	1 (1983)	–	1 (1979)
Louisville	–	1 (2010)	–	–
FIU	–	1 (1996)	–	–
San Diego	–	1 (1992)	–	–
San Diego State	–	1 (1987)	–	–
American	–	1 (1985)	–	–
Harvard	–	–	4 (1969, 1971, 1986, 1987)	–
Army	–	–	4 (1963, 1964, 1965, 1966)	–
Brown	–	–	3 (1968, 1973, 1975)	1 (1977)
Denver	–	–	2 (2016, 2024)	–
Pittsburgh	–	–	2 (2020, 2022)	–
SMU	–	–	2 (2000, 2005)	–
Portland	–	–	2 (1988, 1995)	–
Evansville	–	–	2 (1985, 1990)	–
Furman	–	–	1 (2025)	–
Oregon State	–	–	1 (2023)	–
West Virginia	–	–	1 (2023)	–
Providence	–	–	1 (2014)	–
UMBC	–	–	1 (2014)	–
Michigan	–	–	1 (2010)	–
Virginia Tech	–	–	1 (2007)	–
UMass	–	–	1 (2007)	–
Cal State Fullerton	–	–	1 (1993)	–
Princeton	–	–	1 (1993)	–
Davidson	–	–	1 (1992)	–
Fresno State (Note: Fresno State put its men's soccer program "on hiatus" in January 2004, and has not reinstated that sport.)	–	–	1 (1986)	–
Penn State	–	–	1 (1979)	–
Cornell	–	–	1 (1972)	–
San Jose State	–	–	1 (1968)	–
Springfield	–	–	1 (1962)	–
CCNY	–	–	1 (1959)	–
Jefferson (Note: Made both of its College Cup appearances as Philadelphia Textile.)	–	–	-	2 (1978, 1981)
Eastern Illinois	–	–	0 (1981 Vacated by NCAA)	–

Schools in Italics no longer compete in Division I.
