= Gene Kenney =

American soccer coach (1928–2022)

- Born: Eugene Kenney; May 28, 1928; Urbana, Illinois, U.S.
- Died: June 14, 2022 (aged 94)
- Occupations: Soccer coach, athletics administration
- Years active: 1956–1994
- Known for: Michigan State Spartans men's soccer coach, led team to 2 national championships
- Notable work: Published book Soccer: Sports Techniques

Eugene Kenney (May 15, 1928 – June 14, 2022) was an American wrestler, football player and soccer coach, who is best known as being the first head coach of the Michigan State Spartans men's soccer team. Kenney coached the Spartans from 1956 until 1969, where he led the Spartans to two NCAA co-championships in 1967 and 1968. Following his retirement from coaching, Kenney worked as an athletic administrator for the Michigan State athletics program from 1970 until his retirement in 1994. During his tenure in the school's athletics department, he published Soccer: Sports Techniques a book about philosophies and team strategies to approach the sport.

== Football and wrestling career ==
Kenney's collegiate sports career began in 1946 when he was a four-year member of the Illinois Fighting Illini football team. Kenney never played a competitive game while part of the football team. Kenney was a four-year player in high school football for the Urbana Tigers varsity football team.

Outside of football, Kenney was also an amateur wrestler, as he was a member of the Illinois Fighting Illini wrestling team. Kenney was a one-year letterwinner, being a member of the 1950 wrestling team. Upon graduation in 1950, Kenney became an assistant coach for the North Carolina Tar Heels wrestling program.

== Soccer career ==
Gene Kenney
Personal information
- Full name: Eugene Kenney
- Date of birth: May 8, 1928
- Place of birth: Urbana, Illinois, U.S.
- Date of death: June 14, 2022 (aged 94)

Managerial career
- Years: Team
- 1950: North Carolina Tar Heels (assistant)
- 1956–1969: Michigan State Spartans

Following an illness to then-head coach Marvin Allen, Kenney took control of the Tar Heels soccer team to close out the 1950 season. Following the season, Kenney was deployed to fight in the Korean War. While in Korea, Kenney served as a head coach for several service soccer teams in addition to being an Army officer.

Upon return from Korea, Kenney was hired by Michigan State University to initially coach the wrestling team and serve as a physical education teacher in the region. In his spare time, Kenney also coached the club soccer team at Michigan State until it was upgraded to varsity status in 1956. When the program became a varsity program, MSU athletic director, Biggie Munn, named Kenney as the program's head coach.

During Kenney's time coaching the Spartans, the program experienced the most success in their history. Kenney led the Spartans to 120-13-13 record and helped them claim two NCAA titles.

=== Head coaching record ===
Record table
Season	Team	Overall	Conference	Standing	Postseason
Michigan State (Independent) (1956–1969)
1956	Michigan State	5–0–1			
1957	Michigan State	6–0–2			
1958	Michigan State	8–0–0			
1959	Michigan State	7–2–0			
1960	Michigan State	8–1–0			
1961	Michigan State	8–1–0			
1962	Michigan State	9–2–0			
1963	Michigan State	9–1–0			NCAA First Round
1964	Michigan State	10–1–2			NCAA Runners-up
1965	Michigan State	10–2–0			NCAA Runners-up
1966	Michigan State	10–2–0			NCAA Semifinals
1967	Michigan State	12–0–2			NCAA co-champions
1968	Michigan State	11–1–3			NCAA co-champions
1969	Michigan State	7–2–1			NCAA First Round
Michigan State:		120–13–13 (.866)			
Total:		120–13–13 (.866)			
National champion Postseason invitational champion Conference regular season champion Conference regular season and conference tournament champion Division regular season champion Division regular season and conference tournament champion Conference tournament champion

== Administrative career ==
In 1970, Kenney became an athletic fellow for the school's athletic department until his retirement in 1994.
