= 1964 Navy Midshipmen men's soccer team =

Navy Midshipmen
1964 season
- Head Coach: Glenn Warner
- NCAA: 15–0–0
- NCAA Tournament: Champions

The 1964 Navy Midshipmen men's soccer team represented the United States Naval Academy during the 1964 NCAA Division I men's soccer season. The Midshipmen won their first modern-day NCAA title this season.

== Schedule ==
Date Time, TV	Rank^{#}	Opponent^{#}	Result	Record	Site City, State
Regular Season
09-30-1964*		Brooklyn	W 4–1	1–0–0	Annapolis, MD
10-03-1964*		Haverford	W 5–0	2–0–0	Annapolis, MD
10-10-1964*		at North Carolina	W 7–2	3–0–0	Chapel Hill, NC
10-17-1964*		West Chester	W 1–0	4–0–0	Annapolis, MD
10-24-1964*		Penn State	W 1–0	5–0–0	Annapolis, MD
10-28-1964*		Gettysburg	W 5–1	6–0–0	Annapolis, MD
10-31-1964*		Seton Hall	W 5–0	7–0–0	Annapolis, MD
11-04-1964*		at Maryland	W 1–0	8–0–0	College Park, MD
11-10-1964*		Duke	W 5–0	9–0–0	Annapolis, MD
11-14-1964*		Swarthmore	W 2–1	10–0–0	Annapolis, MD
11-21-1964*		at Army; Rivalry	W 2–1	11–0–0	West Point, NY
NCAA Tournament
11-25-1964*		Fairleigh Dickinson; First round	W 2–1	12–0–0	Annapolis, MD
11-28-1964*		Bridgeport; Second round	W 5–3	13–0–0	Annapolis, MD
12-03-1964*		vs. Saint Louis; Semifinals	W 2–1	14–0–0	Providence, RI
12-05-1964*		vs. Michigan State; Final	W 1–0	15–0–0	Providence, RI
*Non-conference game. ^{#}Rankings from United Soccer Coaches. (#) Tournament seedings in parentheses.
