= 1966 San Francisco Dons men's soccer team =

American college soccer season

1966 San Francisco Dons men's soccer

National Champions

NCAA Tournament, W 5–2 vs. Long Island
- Conference: Independent
- Record: 11–0–1
- Head coach: Stephen Negoesco (5th season)

The 1966 San Francisco Dons men's soccer team represented the University of San Francisco during the 1966 NCAA Division I Men's Soccer Season. The Dons won their first NCAA Soccer Championship title this season, defeating Long Island in the championship. It was the 23rd season the Dons fielded a men's varsity soccer team.

== Background ==
The 1966 team was coached by Stephen Negoesco for his fifth season at the helm. Negoesco guided the Dons to an 11-0-1 record. On the third of December, the USF soccer team played through mud to beat the Long Island University team with a 5–2 victory and the NCAA championship.

== Roster ==
Note: Flags indicate national team as defined under FIFA eligibility rules; some limited exceptions apply. Players may hold more than one non-FIFA nationality.

No.	Pos.	Nation	Player
1	GK	(China) CHN	Mike Ivanow
2	DF	(United States) USA	Al Tsacle
3	DF	(United States) USA	Mike Laurel
-	DF	(Poland) POL	Sam Gerzowski
4	DF	(Israel) ISR	Jerry Katzeff
5	MF	(United States) USA	George Fernandez
6	MF	(Venezuela) VEN	Henry Contreras
10	MF	(Guatemala) GUA	Luis Sagastume
-	FW	(Indonesia) IDN	Rudy Dekkers
7	FW	(Hungary) HUN	Sandor Hites
9	FW	(Peru) PER	Eduardo Rangel
11	FW	(Germany) GER	Lothar Osiander

No.	Pos.	Nation	Player
17	MF	(United States) USA	Alberto Aramendia
18	DF	(Nicaragua) NCA	Ternot MacRenato
15	DF	(United States) USA	Pat Pressentin
13	MF	(Hungary) HUN	Istvan Pribilovics
-	DF	(United States) USA	Gary Royce
14	FW	(United States) USA	Kevin Carey

== Schedule ==
Date Time, TV	Rank^{#}	Opponent^{#}	Result	Record	Site City, State
Preseason
09-15-1966*		USF Alumni	W 6–2		University of San Francisco; San Francisco, CA
Regular season
09-22-1966*		Merritt College	W 7–4	1–0	Unknown; San Francisco, CA
*		vs. Pacific	W 5–1	2–0	Knoles Field; Stockton, CA
*		vs. San Francisco State	W 5–0	3–0	Balboa Stadium; San Francisco, CA
*		vs. UC Davis	W 9–0	4–0	Balboa Stadium; San Francisco, CA
*		vs. Chico State	W 5–0	5–0	University Stadium; Chico, CA
*		vs. Stanford	W 3–1	6–0	Unknown; Stanford, CA
*		vs. San Jose State	W 2–1	7–0	Balboa Stadium; San Francisco, CA
*		vs. UC Berkeley	T 1–1	7–0–1	Balboa Stadium; San Francisco, CA
NCAA Tournament
*		vs. San Jose State; Second round	W 2–1	8–0–1	Balboa Stadium; San Francisco, CA
*		vs. Saint Louis; Quarterfinals	W 2–1 ^{4OT}	9–0–1	Unknown; St. Louis, MO
*		vs. Army; Semifinals	W 2–0	10–0–1	California Memorial Stadium; Berkeley, CA
12-03-1966*		vs. Long Island; Championship	W 5–2	11–0–1	California Memorial Stadium (5,000); Berkeley, CA
*Non-conference game. ^{#}Rankings from United Soccer Coaches. (#) Tournament seedings in parentheses.
