= LIU Sharks men's soccer =

American college soccer team

- Founded: 1933; 93 years ago (Note: The date of establishment of predecessor LIU Brooklyn Blackbirds is taken.)
- University: Long Island University
- Head coach: Nate Bell
- Location: Old Westbury, New York, US
- Stadium: LIU Soccer Park
- Nickname: Sharks
- Colors: Blue and gold
Home	Away

NCAA tournament runner-up
- 1966

NCAA tournament College Cup
- 1966, 1967

NCAA tournament Quarterfinals
- 1966, 1967, 1981, 1982

NCAA tournament Round of 16
- 1963, 1965, 1966, 1967, 1972, 1981, 1982, 1986

NCAA tournament appearances
- 1963, 1965, 1966, 1967, 1971, 1972, 1973, 1977, 1981, 1982, 1985, 1986, 1997, 2004, 2015, 2018, 2021, 2023, 2024

Conference tournament championships
- 1997, 2004, 2015, 2018, 2021, 2023, 2024

The LIU Sharks men's soccer team represents Long Island University in NCAA Division I college soccer. LIU men's soccer competes in the Northeast Conference (NEC). The Sharks play their home games at LIU Soccer Park, located in Brookville, New York. The Sharks are led by head coach Nate Bell.

LIU has won seven Northeast Conference (NEC) tournament titles, most recently in 2024, which is also their most recent NCAA tournament appearance.

== History ==
In 2019, the Division I LIU Brooklyn Blackbirds and Division II LIU-Post Pioneers combined all their athletic programs, including men's soccer. Beginning with the 2019 season, they compete as the "LIU Sharks".

The NEC began hosting conference tournaments in 1989. LIU has been NEC tournament champions in 1997, 2004, 2015, 2018, 2021, 2023, and 2024.

LIU has been to the NCAA tournament in 1963, 1965, 1966, 1967, 1971, 1972, 1973, 1977, 1981, 1982, 1985, 1986, 1997, 2004, 2015, 2018, 2021, 2023, and 2024.

LIU began play in 1933 as "LIU Brooklyn", finishing 3–3–1 in their first season. LIU-Post began play in 1959, with a 7–11–0 record.

The Sharks made their NCAA tournament debut in 1963. They lost their first-ever tourney game in the Sweet 16 to Bridgeport 3–1.

LIU lost in the Sweet 16 of the 1965 tournament to Army, who went on to the 1965 College Cup (Final 4).

At the 1966 tournament, LIU had its greatest NCAA tournament run in school history, making it to the national championship game, where they lost 5–2 to San Francisco.

A year after their loss in the title game, the Sharks returned to College Cup (Final 4) at the 1967 NCAA soccer tournament, where they lost 4–0 to Michigan State.

After a four year absence from the NCAA tournament, LIU returned in 1971 in the 24-team format. LIU lost in the first round to Cornell, 2–1.

In 1972, LIU defeated NYU 2-1 in the first round to advance to the Sweet 16 of the NCAA tournament. In the Sweet 16, they again lost to Cornell, 3–2.

In the team's third straight NCAA tournament appearance in 1973, LIU lost 3–2 to Hartwick College in the 1st round.

The 1977 NCAA tournament appearance ended with a 2–1 first round loss to Cornell. The third team in four appearances the Sharks were knocked out by Cornell.

In the 1981 tournament, LIU was awarded an auto-bid to the Sweet 16. In the Sweet 16 they defeated Columbia 1–0 in 4OT to advance to the Elite 8 for the first time since 1967. In the Elite 8, they were eliminated by UConn, the eventual national champions.

In 1982, LIU received a near identical outcome to their 1981 appearance. In the Sweet 16 the Sharks defeated Columbia 3–1 to advance to the Elite 8. In the Elite 8, UConn eliminated them 1–0. UConn, the defending national champs fell in the Final 4.

LIU lost in the first round of the 1985 tournament to Columbia 3–1.

The Sharks received an auto bid to the Sweet 16 in 1986 but lost 3–2 to Hartwick College.

After the team’s 1986 NCAA tournament appearance, they would not return to the tournament until the 1997 NCAA Division I men's soccer tournament 11 years later. LIU lost to Boston University 1–0 in the NCAA tournament play-in game.

In 2004, LIU returned to the NCAA tournament after a seven year absence with a first round 3–0 loss to American in the 48-team tourney.

At the 2015 tournament, LIU lost in the first round in penalties to Rutgers.

In 2018, LIU lost in the first round to West Virginia 4–2.

At the 2021 tournament, the Sharks defeated Maryland 1–0 in the first round of the tournament. In the round of 32, they were defeated 5–1 by Saint Louis.

In 2023, LIU defeated Sacred Heart 1–0 to win the NEC championship and the conference’s automatic NCAA tournament berth. In the 2023 NCAA tournament, the Sharks lost 2–1 to Denver in round 1.

In 2024, LIU won the NEC championship in penalties over FDU after 2OT, earning back-to-back NEC titles. In the 2024 NCAA tournament, the Sharks lost 5–2 to Maryland in the 1st round in College Park, Maryland.

== Titles ==
=== Conference ===
- NEC regular season (8): 1985, 1986, 1989, 2002 (Note: Won by LIU Brooklyn, before the merger.) 2021, 2023, 2024, 2026
- NEC tournament (7): 1997, 2004, 2015, 2018, 2021, 2023, 2024
