= 1989 NCAA Division I men's soccer tournament =

1989 Men's College Cup

Tournament details
- Country: United States
- Venue(s): Rutgers Stadium; Piscataway, New Jersey
- Teams: 28

Final positions
- Champions: Virginia (1st title); Santa Clara (1st title)
- Semifinalists: Indiana; Rutgers

Tournament statistics
- Matches played: 27
- Goals scored: 77 (2.85 per match)
- Attendance: 67,338 (2,494 per match)
- Top goal scorer(s): Steve Snow, Indiana (4)

Awards
- Best player: Jeff Baicher, Santa Clara (offensive); Tony Meola, Virginia (defensive)

The 1989 NCAA Division I men's soccer tournament was the 31st annual tournament organized by the National Collegiate Athletic Association to determine the national champion of men's collegiate soccer among its Division I members in the United States.

The final match was played on December 3 at Rutgers Stadium in Piscataway, New Jersey. All the other games were played at the home field of the higher seeded team.

Virginia and Santa Clara were declared co-national champions after the championship game ended in a 1–1 tie, the first national titles for each program. This tournament marks the third and final time the NCAA recognized men's soccer co-champions; the 1967 final was called due to weather, while the 1968 final was also a draw by rule.

== Qualifying ==
One team made their debut appearance in the NCAA Division I men's soccer tournament: Old Dominion.

== Bracket ==
First round
Fairleigh Dickinson | 1
Columbia | 4
Connecticut | 0
Vermont | 2
Yale | 1
Hartwick College | 0
Princeton | 1
Philadelphia Textile | 2
Wake Forest | 2
Old Dominion | 1
South Carolina | 2
Duke | 1
George Washington | 3
George Mason | 1
Howard (pen.) | 2
Penn State | 1
Evansville | 0
SMU | 1
Fresno State | 2
Saint Louis | 1
Portland (OT) | 1
Washington | 0
UCLA (pen.) | 2
San Diego State | 1

Second round
Rutgers | 3
Columbia | 1
Vermont | 1
Yale | 0
Virginia | 4
Philadelphia Textile | 1
Wake Forest | 1
South Carolina | 5
Indiana | 4
George Washington | 0
Howard (OT) | 2
SMU | 1
Santa Clara | 2
Fresno State | 1
Portland | 0
UCLA (pen.) | 1

Quarterfinals
Rutgers (OT) | 2
Vermont | 1
Virginia (OT) | 1
South Carolina | 0
Indiana | 1
Howard | 0
Santa Clara | 2
UCLA | 0

Semifinals
Rutgers | 0
Virginia | 3
Indiana | 2
Santa Clara | 4

Championship
Virginia (4OT) | 1
Santa Clara | 1

== Final ==
The final was played in frigid conditions; the wind chill was ten degrees below zero at kickoff and dropped throughout the game, with the stiff breeze taking control of almost any ball kicked in the air. After the marathon 1985 final, which was played with unlimited 10-minute overtimes and required eight of them, the NCAA changed their rules to limit games to one 30-minute overtime and one 30-minute sudden-death period, each with two halves. Although all other tournament games could be decided by penalty kicks, this did not extend to the final. After the 150 minutes were played out, Virginia and Santa Clara were declared co-champions.

December 3, 1989

| Virginia | 1–1 (a.e.t.) | Santa Clara |
|---|---|---|
| Fallon 27' | Report | Baicher 84' |

Rutgers Stadium, Piscataway, NJ
Attendance: 3,889

== See also ==
- 1989 NCAA Division I women's soccer tournament
- 1989 NCAA Division II men's soccer tournament
- 1989 NCAA Division III men's soccer tournament
- 1989 NAIA men's soccer championship
