= Army–Navy Cup =

Men's soccer rivalry

- Army Black Knights Navy Midshipmen
- Sport: Soccer
- First meeting: 23 Nov 1938; Army 2–1 Navy
- Latest meeting: 09 Oct 2026; Navy 4–3 Army
- Next meeting: TBD
- Stadiums: Subaru Park (2012–present)
- Trophy: Army-Navy Cup

Statistics
- Total meetings: 93
- All-time series: Navy leads, 42–33–17 (Total)
- Trophy series: Army, 6–4–4
- Largest victory: Army 4–0 Navy (10 Oct 2025)
- Longest win streak: Navy, 10 (1955–1964)
- Longest unbeaten streak: Navy, 21 (1954–1973)
- Current unbeaten streak: Navy, 1 (2026–present)

The Army–Navy Cup is an annual men's college soccer match between the United States Military Academy (Army) and the United States Naval Academy (Navy). Since its inaugural game in 2012, it has been played at a neutral venue, much like its college football counterpart. Like the American football rivalry, the game is held in the Philadelphia metropolitan area. However, it is held at Subaru Park, the home field of Major League Soccer's Philadelphia Union.

== Background ==
Prior to the arrival of the neutral-site Army–Navy Cup, the two sides had met 77 times, and annually since 1938. In the first match between the two programs, the Army Black Knights defeated the Navy Midshipmen, 2–1 in West Point. Army would go on dominate the series through the late 1940s, with the Black Knights beating the Midshipmen 10 times to six. During this time, both programs were among the most elite college soccer programs in the nation. In 1945, Army was honored with an Intercollegiate Soccer Football Association (NCAA's predecessor) with a co-national championship, making it, to date, Army's only national soccer title. Navy also shared the title with Army, along with Yale and Haverford. In addition to the shared 1945 title, Navy has won three additional ISFA title, and one NCAA Division I Men's Soccer Championship. Navy's other ISFA championships came in 1932, 1943 and 1944. Their 1944 was an outright title, while their 1932 and 1943 titles were shared. Their 1932 title was shared with Penn, while their 1943 title was shared with Rensselaer.

Throughout the early 1950s until the mid-1970s, Navy's soccer team dominated Army. From their 1954 to 1974 encounter, Navy went undefeated against Army for a record 21 consecutive seasons, including knocking Army out of three NCAA Tournaments. In 1974, Army defeated Navy, 2-1 ending the Black Knights' drought against the Mids. Since the early 1980s, the series between the schools has been fairly even, although the programs have sporadically qualified for the NCAA Tournament in the last three decades. Navy most recently qualified in 2013, and prior to that was 1988. Army's last appearance in the NCAA Tournament came in 1996 against William & Mary.

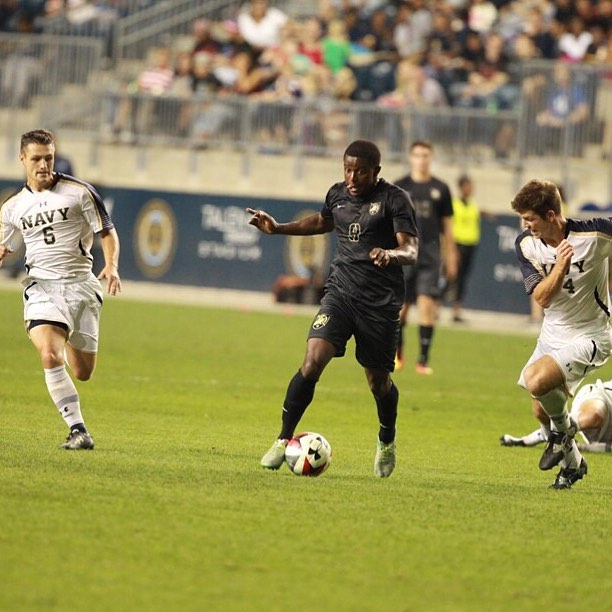
The 2017 Cup at Talen Energy Stadium

Despite the lack of success on the pitch, both programs have still enjoyed a heated rivalry with each other, much of which mirrors of the rivalry seen across other college sports between the two sides. In the early 2010s, an effort began to press for a neutral site venue for their annual regular season encounter, which was solidified in mid-2012.

On July 25, 2012, it was announced that the two programs would play at the then-called, PPL Park in Chester, Pennsylvania. The event, dubbed the "Army-Navy Cup" was hosted by the Philadelphia Union in conjunction with Keystone Sports and Entertainment and Global Spectrum. This marked the first time since 1966 the two programs met in Philadelphia, and the first time since 1994 the sides played against each other at a neutral venue. The second once was dubbed Army–Navy Cup II, indicating the possibility for a renewal each season.

Army–Navy Cup III drew a crowd of 10,168 making it the largest neutral crowd for the 2014 NCAA Division I men's soccer season, and the third-largest crowd for college soccer that year. Since this event, the Army–Navy Cup has been one of the highest attended college soccer events in the nation, and has enjoyed regional, local and national interest.

Despite the COVID-19 pandemic, the 2020/21 edition of the Army–Navy Cup was the largest attended game of the regular season with an attendance of 2,483.

== Results ==
=== Pre-Cup era (1938–2011) ===
The programs met 78 times prior to the Cup inauguration in 2012.

Army victories	Navy victories	Tie games

No.	Date	Location	Winner	Score
1	November 23, 1938	West Point, NY	Army	2–1
2	November 23, 1939	Annapolis, MD	Army	2–1
3	November 21, 1940	West Point, NY	Army	2–0
4	November 22, 1941	Annapolis, MD	Army	5–3
5	November 26, 1942	West Point, NY	Navy	3–2
6	November 25, 1943	Annapolis, MD	Navy	3–1
7	November 25, 1944	West Point, NY	Navy	1–0
8	November 24, 1945	Annapolis, MD	Army	1–0
9	November 23, 1946	West Point, NY	Army	2–1
10	November 22, 1947	Annapolis, MD	Navy	1–0
11	November 20, 1948	West Point, NY	Navy	2–1
12	November 19, 1949	Annapolis, MD	Navy	1–0
13	November 27, 1950	West Point, NY	Army	4–3
14	November 24, 1951	Annapolis, MD	Army	3–1
15	November 22, 1952	West Point, NY	Army	2–1
16	November 21, 1953	Annapolis, MD	Army	2–1
17	November 20, 1954	West Point, NY	Tie	1–1
18	November 20, 1955	Annapolis, MD	Navy	3–0
19	November 24, 1956	West Point, NY	Navy	4–1
20	November 23, 1957	Annapolis, MD	Navy	3–1
21	November 22, 1958	West Point, NY	Navy	4–1
22	November 21, 1959	Annapolis, MD	Navy	2–1
23	November 19, 1960	West Point, NY	Navy	2–1
24	November 25, 1961	Annapolis, MD	Navy	3–0
25	November 24, 1962	West Point, NY	Navy	1–0
26	December 5, 1963	Brunswick, NJ	Navy	4–0
27	November 21, 1964	West Point, NY	Navy	2–1

No.	Date	Location	Winner	Score
28	November 20, 1965	Annapolis, MD	Tie	2–2
29	November 19, 1966	West Point, NY	Tie	1–1
30	November 26, 1966	Philadelphia, PA	Navy	3–1
31	November 25, 1967	Annapolis, MD	Navy	4–3
32	November 23, 1968	West Point, NY	Tie	1–1
33	November 22, 1969	Annapolis, MD	Tie	0–0
34	November 21, 1970	West Point, NY	Navy	2–0
35	November 20, 1971	Annapolis, MD	Navy	2–0
36	November 25, 1972	West Point, NY	Tie	2–2
37	November 24, 1973	Annapolis, MD	Navy	2–0
38	November 23, 1974	West Point, NY	Army	2–1
39	November 22, 1975	Annapolis, MD	Navy	2–1
40	November 20, 1976	West Point, NY	Tie	1–1
41	November 19, 1977	Annapolis, MD	Army	2–1
42	November 25, 1978	West Point, NY	Army	1–0
43	November 9, 1979	Annapolis, MD	Navy	2–0
44	November 7, 1980	West Point, NY	Navy	3–1
45	November 6, 1981	Annapolis, MD	Army	1–0
46	November 5, 1982	West Point, NY	Army	2–1
47	November 4, 1983	Annapolis, MD	Navy	1–0
48	November 9, 1984	West Point, NY	Army	1–0
49	November 8, 1985	Annapolis, MD	Navy	2–0
50	November 8, 1986	West Point, NY	Navy	1–0
51	November 6, 1987	Annapolis, MD	Army	1–0
52	November 10, 1988	West Point, NY	Tie	2–2
53	October 28, 1989	Annapolis, MD	Tie	2–2
54	October 26, 1990	West Point, NY	Navy	2–0

No.	Date	Location	Winner	Score
55	October 25, 1991	Annapolis, MD	Navy	3–1
56	November 9, 1991	Annapolis, MD	Army	2–1
57	October 23, 1992	West Point, NY	Army	2–0
58	November 7, 1992	West Point, NY	Tie	1–1
59	October 22, 1993	Annapolis, MD	Navy	1–0
60	October 21, 1994	West Point, NY	Army	2–1
61	October 20, 1995	Annapolis, MD	Navy	5–2
62	October 25, 1996	West Point, NY	Navy	1–0
63	November 11, 1996	Hamilton, NY	Army	4–1
64	October 24, 1997	Annapolis, MD	Navy	4–3
65	October 23, 1998	West Point, NY	Army	4–3
66	October 22, 1999	Annapolis, MD	Navy	3–2
67	October 20, 2000	West Point, NY	Army	2–0
68	October 19, 2001	Annapolis, MD	Tie	0–0
69	October 18, 2002	West Point, NY	Tie	0–0
70	October 24, 2003	Annapolis, MD	Army	1–0
71	October 23, 2004	West Point, NY	Tie	0–0
72	October 28, 2005	Annapolis, MD	Navy	4–2
73	October 20, 2006	West Point, NY	Army	4–3
74	November 10, 2007	Annapolis, MD	Army	2–1
75	November 7, 2008	West Point, NY	Army	1–0
76	September 26, 2009	Annapolis, MD	Navy	1–0
77	September 25, 2010	West Point, NY	Navy	1–0
78	October 1, 2011	Annapolis, MD	Navy	1–0
Series: Navy leads 38–27–13

=== Cup era (2012–present) ===
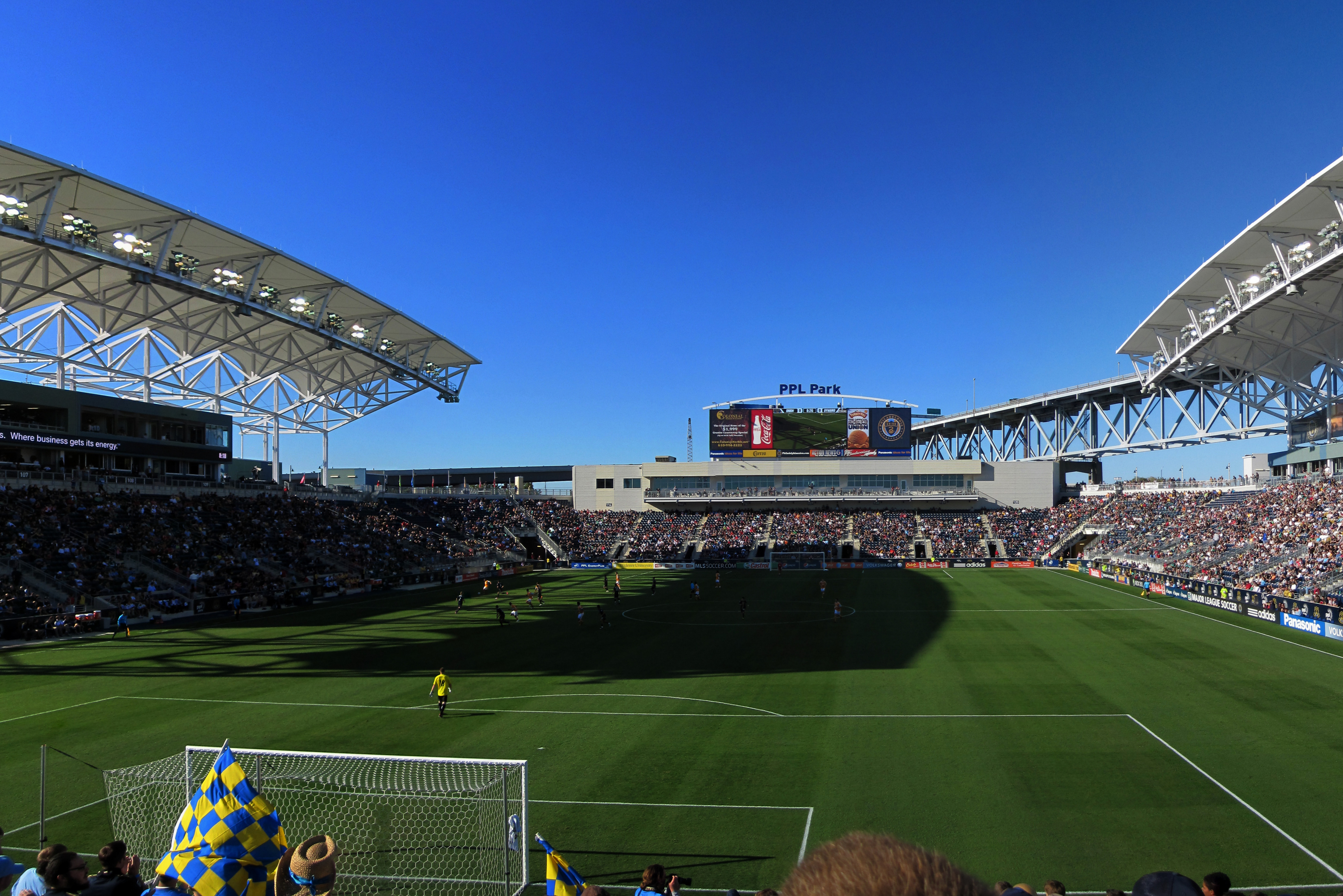
All Cup-era matches have been played at Subaru Park in Chester, Pennsylvania.

Army victories	Navy victories

No.	Date	Location	Winner	Score	Attendance
1	September 30, 2012	Chester, PA	Tie	1–1	3,672
2	November 8, 2013	Chester, PA	Navy	1–0 ^{2OT}	7,416
3	November 7, 2014	Chester, PA	Navy	1–0 ^{2OT}	10,168
4	November 3, 2015	Chester, PA	Army	2–1	9,316
5	September 23, 2016	Chester, PA	Army	1–0	10,092
6	October 15, 2017	Chester, PA	Tie	0–0	8,143
7	October 12, 2018	Chester, PA	Army	4–1	8,594
8	October 11, 2019	Chester, PA	Tie	1–1	8,808
9	April 25, 2021	Chester, PA	Army	2–0	2,483
10	October 9, 2021	Chester, PA	Navy	3–0	5,356
11	October 7, 2022	Chester, PA	Army	2–0	8,526
12	October 13, 2023	Chester, PA	Tie	1–1	8,000
13	October 11, 2024	Chester, PA	Army	2–1	10,134
14	October 10, 2025	Chester, PA	Army	4–0	11,363
15	October 9, 2026	Chester, PA	Navy	4–3	TBD
Series: Army leads 7–4–4

== See also ==
- Commander-in-Chief's Trophy
- Army–Navy lacrosse rivalry
