= 1966 Saint Louis Billikens men's soccer team =

American college soccer season

1966 Saint Louis Billikens men's soccer
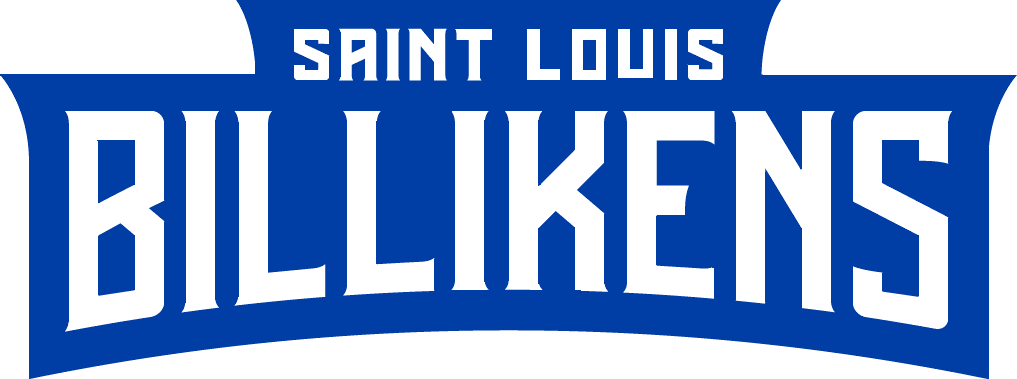

NCAA Tournament, Final, L 1–2 vs. San Francisco
- Conference: Independent
- Record: 7-4-3
- Head coach: Harry Keough (2nd season)

The 1966 Saint Louis Billikens men's soccer team was Saint Louis University's competitive soccer team for the 1966 NCAA Division I men's soccer season. They advanced to, but were defeated in the Quarterfinals of the 1966 NCAA Soccer tournament by eventual champion San Francisco, which was the earliest playoff exit in the Billikens' history up to that point. The team finished with a 7-4-3 record for the season.

This season was the worst season by the Billikens in the team's history up to that point. Their results for the regular season and playoffs are below:

The Billikens started 2-3-1, but after their loss to Kurtis they did not lose again until the quarterfinals of the playoffs.

Date Time, TV	Rank^{#}	Opponent^{#}	Result	Record	Site City, State
Regular season
September 24, 1966*		Air Force	W 2-0	1–0	
September 28, 1966*		at Quincy	L 1-2	1–1	Quincy, Illinois
September 30, 1966*		at Indiana	T 2-2	1-1-1	Bloomington, Indiana
October 2, 1966*		Rockhurst	L 0-1	1-2-1	Kansas City, Missouri
October 8, 1966*		British Columbia	W 1–0	2-2-1	SLU Soccer Field; St. Louis
October 9, 1966*		at Kutis	L 1-2	2-3-1	SLU Soccer Field; St. Louis
October 15, 1966*		MacMurray	W 5-0	3–3–1	Jacksonville, Illinois
October 22, 1966*		Miami (Florida)	W 9-0	4–3–1	SLU Soccer Field; St. Louis
October 23, 1966*		Northwestern	W 6-0	5–3–1	SLU Soccer Field; St. Louis
October 29, 1966*		Alumni	T 0-0	5–3–2	SLU Soccer Field; St. Louis
November 5, 1966*		Michigan State	T 1-1	5-3-3	SLU Soccer Field; St. Louis
November 12, 1966*		Illinois	W 4-1	6-3-3	Champaign-Urbana, Illinois
NCAA Tournament
November 20, 1966*		Colorado College	W 5-1	7-3-3	Colorado Springs, Colorado
November 26, 1966*		San Francisco	L 1-2	7-4-3	San Francisco
*Non-conference game. ^{#}Rankings from United Soccer Coaches. (#) Tournament seedings in parentheses.
