= 1965 NAIA soccer championship =

1965 NAIA Soccer Championship

Tournament details
- Country: United States
- Venue(s): Rockhurst College; Kansas City, Missouri
- Teams: 4

Final positions
- Champions: Trenton State (2nd title)
- Runners-up: Earlham

Tournament statistics
- Matches played: 4
- Goals scored: 19 (4.75 per match)

Awards
- Best player: Wayne Huston, Trenton State

The 1965 NAIA Soccer Championship was the seventh annual tournament held by the NAIA to determine the national champion of men's college soccer among its members in the United States.

Defending champions Trenton State defeated Earlham in the final, 6–2, to claim the Lions' second NAIA national title.

The final was played at Rockhurst College in Kansas City, Missouri.

== Bracket ==
First Round
Earlham	2
Lincoln (PA)	0
Trenton State	5
Quinnipiac	0

Championship; Kansas City, MO
Earlham	2
Trenton State	6
Third Place
Lincoln (PA)	2
Quinnipiac	0

== See also ==
- 1965 NCAA soccer tournament
