= Gary St. Clair =

American soccer player and coach

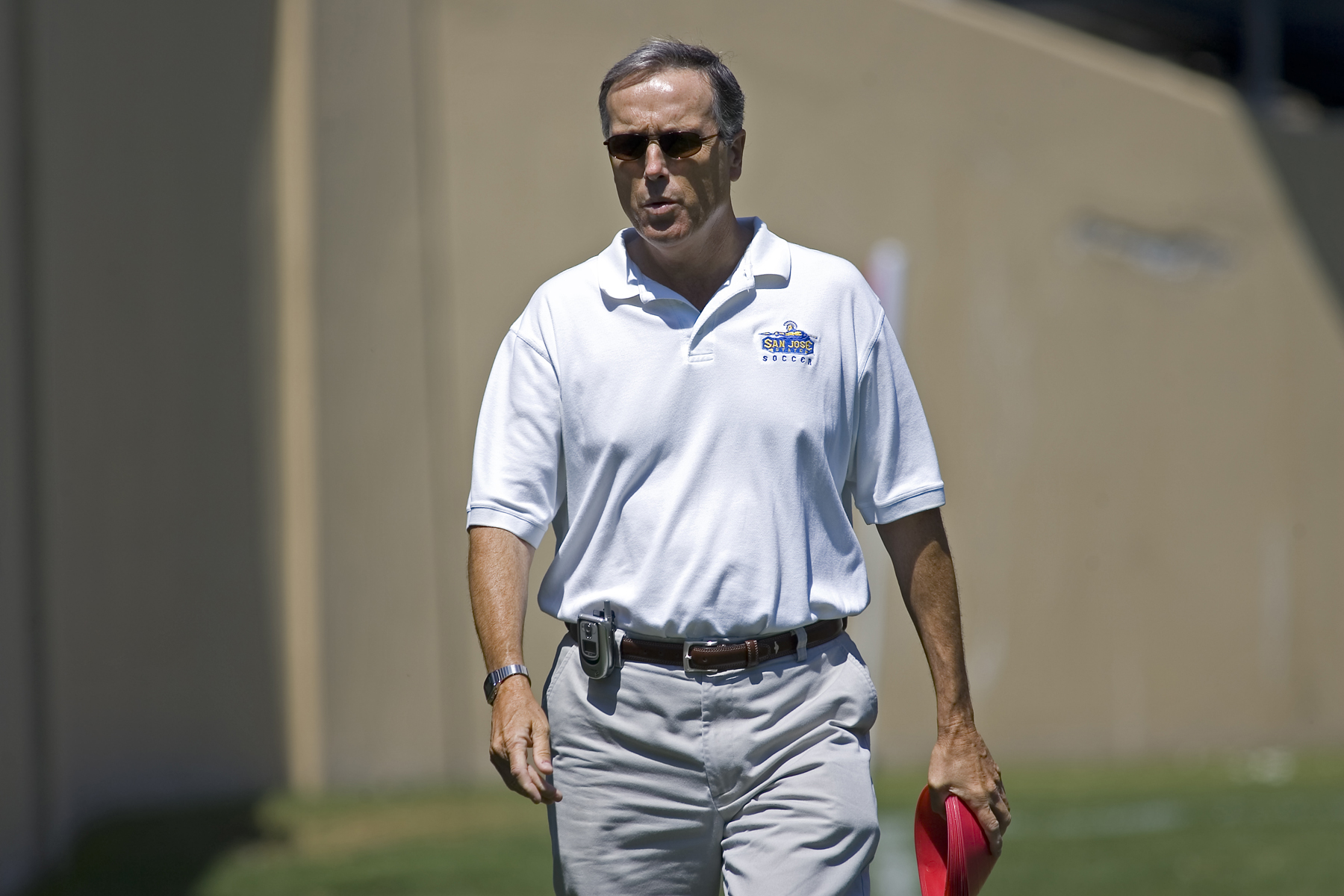
- St. Clair in 2006.

Personal information
- Date of birth: August 7, 1952 (age 74)
- Place of birth: Glendale, California, U.S.
- Height: 6 ft 3 in (1.91 m)
- Position: Goalkeeper

Youth career
- 1970–1974: San Jose State Spartans

Senior career*
Years	Team	Apps	(Gls)
1975	San Jose Earthquakes	3	(0)
1976	San Diego Jaws	3	(0)

Managerial career
- 1977–1982: Leland Chargers
- 1983–1989: West Valley Vikings
- 1990–2013: San Jose State Spartans
- 2017–2021: Valley Christian Warriors
- * Club domestic league appearances and goals

Gary Martin St. Clair (born August 7, 1952) is an American retired soccer goalkeeper and coach. He played professionally in the North American Soccer League and was head coach at the high school, junior college, and college levels. From 1990 to 2013, St. Clair was head men's soccer coach at San Jose State University.

== Player ==
St. Clair attended San Jose State University and played goalkeeper on the men's soccer team from 1970 to 1974. He earned a two all-conference and three all-region honors and has held the school record with 18 career shutouts. He graduated in 1976 with bachelor's degree and, in 1984, earned a master's degree from Saint Mary's College of California.

In the 1975 North American Soccer League draft, St. Clair was the ninth overall pick by the Dallas Tornado and was the first goalkeeper selected. St. Clair played three games for the San Jose Earthquakes in 1975 and three games for the San Diego Jaws in 1976. He was the starting goalkeeper for the U.S. national team during qualification for the 1976 Montreal Games.

== Coaching career ==
After retiring as a player, St. Clair entered the coaching ranks. From 1977 to 1982, he was head coach at Leland High School in San Jose, with a cumulative 89-16-9 record and five conference championships. Then from 1983 to 1989, he was head coach at West Valley College, a junior college in Saratoga, accumulating a 75-21-14 record that included four conference championships.

In 1990, he was hired as head coach at San Jose State University, a position he would hold until 2013. He was 217-211-41 in 24 seasons. He was the Mountain Pacific Sports Federation Coach of the Year in 2000 & 2003. His 2000 Team set a school record with a 20-1-1 record which included being ranked #1 during the season by the National Soccer Coaches Association of America. Two of his players, CJ Brown and Ryan Suarez, played for the United States Men's National Team.

St. Clair returned to coaching in 2017 as head boys' soccer coach at Valley Christian High School in San Jose.

== Head coaching record ==
The following section shows St. Clair's record in NCAA Division I coaching.

Record table
Season	Team	Overall	Conference	Standing	Postseason
San Jose State Spartans (Big West Conference) (1990–1991)
1990	San Jose State	4–17	2–8	5th	
1991	San Jose State	5–14–1	1–8–1	6th	
San Jose State (Big West):		9–31–1 (.232)	3–16–1 (.175)		
San Jose State Spartans (Mountain Pacific Sports Federation) (1992–1995)
1992	San Jose State	6–10–3	1–5–1	7th (Mountain)	
1993	San Jose State	9–7–2	1–5–1	7th (Mountain)	
1994	San Jose State	15–4	4–3	4th (Mountain)	
1995	San Jose State	6–11–3	3–3–1	4th (Mountain)	
San Jose State Spartans (Western Athletic Conference) (1996–1999)
1996	San Jose State	10–6–3	4–2–2	4th	
1997	San Jose State	9–10	5–3	T–3rd	
1998	San Jose State	14–6–1	4–3–1	T–4th	
1999	San Jose State	7–11–2	4–6	4th	
San Jose State Spartans (Mountain Pacific Sports Federation) (2000–2012)
2000	San Jose State	20–1–1	8–0	1st (Mountain)	NCAA First Round
2001	San Jose State	9–7–4	2–2–3	6th	
2002	San Jose State	11–9–1	5–1	T–1st	
2003	San Jose State	12–7–2	5–1	1st	NCAA First Round
2004	San Jose State	5–13–1	4–8	T–6th	
2005	San Jose State	11–5–3	7–2–1	2nd	
2006	San Jose State	7–10–1	4–6	T–4th	
2007	San Jose State	10–9–1	5–5	3rd	
2008	San Jose State	9–5–4	5–4–1	3rd	
2009	San Jose State	9–10–1	4–3	3rd	
2010	San Jose State	7–9–3	1–6–3	4th (Pacific)	
2011	San Jose State	9–8–3	5–5	3rd (Pacific)	
2012	San Jose State	8–9–1	5–4–1	2nd (Pacific)	
San Jose State Spartans (Western Athletic Conference) (2013)
2013	San Jose State	4–13–4	3–6–1	T–6th	
San Jose State (MPSF):		163–134–34 (.544)	69–63–15 (.520)		
San Jose State (WAC):		44–45–10 (.495)	20–20–4 (.500)		
Total:		217–211–41 (.506)			
National champion Postseason invitational champion Conference regular season champion Conference regular season and conference tournament champion Division regular season champion Division regular season and conference tournament champion Conference tournament champion
