= 1967 NCAA soccer tournament =

1967 College Cup

Tournament details
- Country: United States
- Venue(s): Francis Field; St. Louis, Missouri
- Teams: 16

Final positions
- Champions: Michigan State (1st title); Saint Louis (6th title)
- Semifinalists: Long Island; Navy

Tournament statistics
- Matches played: 15
- Goals scored: 61 (4.07 per match)

Awards
- Best player: Ernie Tuchscherer, Michigan State

The 1967 NCAA soccer tournament was the ninth annual tournament organized by the National Collegiate Athletic Association to determine the national champion of men's college soccer among its members in the United States.

The final match was played at Francis Field in St. Louis, Missouri on December 2.

Michigan State and Saint Louis were declared co-national champions after the championship game, tied 0–0, had to be called due to inclement weather. This was Michigan State's first and Saint Louis' sixth title.

== Qualifying ==
Qualified teams
School	Record	Appearance	Last Bid
Akron	10–2	2nd	1966
Army	8–2–2	5th	1966
Bridgeport	8–3	5th	1966
Buffalo State	8–1	1st	Never
Colorado College	6–2	2nd	1966
Fairleigh Dickinson	8–4	3rd	1964
Long Island	11–1–1	4th	1966
Maryland	8–2–1	7th	1964
Michigan State	7–1	6th	1966
Navy	10–0–1	5th	1966
Saint Louis	5–3–1	9th	1966
San Francisco	9–0–1	6th	1966
San Jose State	9–1	4th	1966
Temple	11–0–1	2nd	1966
Trinity (CT)	9–2	3rd	1965
West Chester State	13–1	6th	1965

== Bracket ==
First Round
Long Island	2
Bridgeport	0
Trinity (CT)	6
Army	1
Michigan State	4
Maryland	1
Temple	0
Akron	1
Navy	5
West Chester State	0
Fairleigh Dickinson	1
Buffalo State (2OT)	2
Saint Louis	6
Colorado College	1
San Jose State (2OT, PK)	3
San Francisco	3

Quarterfinals
Long Island	3
Trinity (CT)	1
Michigan State	3
Akron	1
Navy	2
Buffalo State	1
Saint Louis	4
San Jose State	3

Semifinals
Long Island	0
Michigan State	4
Navy	0
Saint Louis	1

Championship
Michigan State	0
Saint Louis	0

== See also ==
- 1967 NAIA Soccer Championship
