= 1970 NCAA soccer tournament =

1970 College Cup

Tournament details
- Country: United States
- Venue(s): Cougar Field; Edwardsville, Illinois
- Teams: 24

Final positions
- Champions: Saint Louis (8th title)
- Runners-up: UCLA
- Semifinalists: Hartwick College; Howard

Tournament statistics
- Matches played: 23
- Goals scored: 79 (3.43 per match)

Awards
- Best player: None designated

The 1970 NCAA soccer tournament was the 12th annual tournament organized by the National Collegiate Athletic Association to determine the national champion of men's college soccer among its members in the United States.

The final match was played at Cougar Field in Edwardsville, Illinois on December 5.

Saint Louis won their eighth national title—and second title in a row—by defeating UCLA in the championship game, 1–0.

== Qualifying ==
Four teams made their debut appearances in the NCAA soccer tournament: Columbia, Denver, Penn State, and WPI.

== Bracket ==
First round
Harvard	6
WPI	0
Brown	1
Middlebury	0
Hartwick College	4
Army	0
Buffalo State	1
Columbia	2
Navy	1
South Florida	0
Howard	2
Maryland	0
Penn State	2
Delaware	1
Pennsylvania	1
Philadelphia Textile	2

Second round
Harvard	2
Brown	1
Hartwick College	6
Columbia	1
Saint Louis	7
Akron	0
SIU Edwardsville	6
Cleveland State	0
San Jose State	1
Denver	2
UCLA	1
San Francisco	0
Navy	0
Howard	2
Penn State	1
Philadelphia Textile	2

Quarterfinals
Harvard	3
Hartwick College	4
Saint Louis	2
SIU Edwardsville	1
Denver	1
UCLA	3
Howard	1
Philadelphia Textile	0

Semifinals
Hartwick College	0
Saint Louis	1
UCLA	4
Howard	3

Championship
Saint Louis	1
UCLA	0

== Final ==
December 5, 1970

Saint Louis	1–0	UCLA

Cougar Field, Edwardsville, Illinois
Attendance: 8,000

== See also ==
- 1970 NAIA Soccer Championship
