= 1961 NCAA soccer tournament =

Tournament details
- Country: United States
- Venue(s): Public Schools Stadium; St. Louis, Missouri
- Teams: 8

Final positions
- Champions: West Chester State (1st title)
- Runners-up: Saint Louis
- Semifinalists: Bridgeport; Rutgers

Tournament statistics
- Matches played: 7
- Goals scored: 22 (3.14 per match)

Awards
- Best player: Bill Foulke, West Chester State (offensive); Bill Killen, West Chester State (defensive)

The 1961 NCAA soccer tournament was the third annual tournament organized by the National Collegiate Athletic Association to determine the national champion of men's college soccer among its members in the United States.

The tournament final was played at Public Schools Stadium in St. Louis, Missouri on November 25.

West Chester State won their first title, defeating two-time defending champion Saint Louis, 2–0.

== Qualifying ==
Qualified teams
| School | Record | Appearance | Last Bid |
|---|---|---|---|
| Bridgeport | 8–2 | 2nd | 1959 |
| Brockport State | 9–1 | 1st | Never |
| Maryland | 9–0–1 | 3rd | 1960 |
| NYU | 8–1 | 1st | Never |
| Rutgers | 10–0–1 | 2nd | 1960 |
| Saint Louis | 11–1 | 3rd | 1960 |
| San Francisco | 6–2–1 | 2nd | 1959 |
| West Chester State | 10–0–1 | 3rd | 1960 |

== Bracket ==
First Round
NYU | 0
Bridgeport | 1
West Chester State | 4
Maryland | 2
Rutgers | 3
Brockport State | 1
Saint Louis | 1
San Francisco | 0

Semifinals
Bridgeport | 0
West Chester State | 2
Rutgers | 1
Saint Louis | 6

Championship
West Chester State | 2
Saint Louis | 0

== See also ==
- 1961 NAIA Soccer Championship
