= Fairleigh Dickinson Knights men's soccer =

American college soccer team

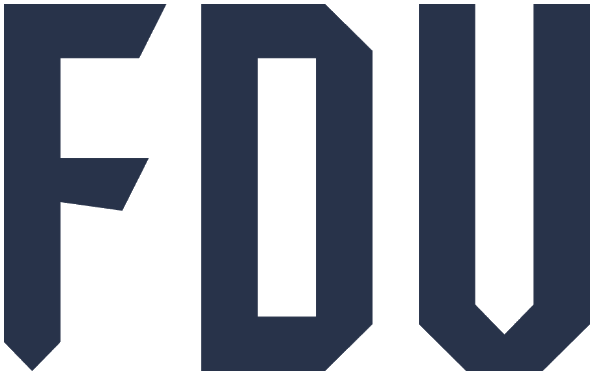
- Founded: 1954; 72 years ago
- University: Fairleigh Dickinson University
- Head coach: Jaymee Highcock
- Conference: Northeast
- Location: Teaneck, New Jersey, US
- Stadium: University Stadium (capacity: ?)
- Nickname: Knights
- Colors: Burgundy and blue
Home	Away

NCAA tournament Quarterfinals
- 1983, 1984, 2001

NCAA tournament Round of 16
- 1963, 1964, 1967, 1968, 1975, 1983, 1984, 1988, 2001, 2012

NCAA tournament appearances
- 1963, 1964, 1967, 1968, 1974, 1975, 1982, 1983, 1984, 1988, 1989, 2000, 2001, 2002, 2003, 2008, 2012, 2019, 2022, 2025

Conference tournament championships
- 1989, 2000, 2001, 2002, 2003, 2008, 2012, 2019, 2022, 2026

The Fairleigh Dickinson Knights men's soccer team represents Fairleigh Dickinson University in NCAA Division I college soccer. Fairleigh Dickinson men's soccer competes in the Northeast Conference (NEC). The Knights are led by head coach Jaymee Highcock.

== History ==
The Knights men's soccer program played their inaugural season in 1954, finishing 3-3-0 overall.

The Knights first NCAA tournament came in 1963, losing in the Sweet 16 to West Chester State 2-0. In the 1964 NCAA tournament Fairleigh Dickinson lost 2-1 to Navy in the first round of the 15-team tournament. The 1967 NCAA tournament resulted in the Knights' third straight NCAA tournament loss, 2-1 to Buffalo State in 2OT in the Sweet 16 of the 16-team tourney.

In 1968, at the 1968 NCAA soccer tournament, Fairleigh Dickinson advanced to the Sweet 16 after a win over Hofstra 3-1. The win over Hofstra was the Knights first NCAA tournament win in program history. In the Sweet 16, they were eliminated by Brown 3-1.

In 1974, the Knights lost in the first round of the NCAA tournament in the then 24-team field. In 1975, Fairleigh Dickinson defeated Bucknell in round 1 at the 1975 NCAA Division I soccer tournament. In the Sweet 16 they were eliminated by Philadelphia Textile 5-0.

At the 1983 NCAA Division I men's soccer tournament, the Knights broke through with two tournament wins in round 1 3-2 over Philadelphia Textile and 2-1 over Rutgers in the Sweet 16. In the program's first Elite 8 appearance, they lost to eventual national runner-ups Columbia 1-0.

In the 1984 NCAA Division I men's soccer tournament, Fairleigh Dickinson got a first round bye into the Sweet 16 where they defeated Penn State 1-0 to advance to their second consecutive Elite 8. In the Elite 8, the Knights fell 1-0 to the Hartwick Hawks.

After missing the NCAA tournament in three straight seasons, the Knights returned to the national tournament in 1988 at the 1988 NCAA Division I men's soccer tournament. In the first round of the tournament, Fairleigh Dickinson defeated Penn State 1-0 to advance to the Sweet 16. In the Sweet 16, they fell 1-0 to Virginia.

In 1989, at the 1989 NCAA Division I men's soccer tournament, Fairleigh Dickinson was a 1st round exit to Columbia, with a 4-1 loss.

The 2001 appearance at the 2001 NCAA Division I men's soccer tournament featured one of the best tournament runs in school history. In the first year of the expanded 48-team field, the Knights won three tournament games in the first round, Round of 32, and Sweet 16. In the Elite 8, Fairleigh Dickinson fell in a heartbreaker to North Carolina 3-2 in 3OT. After surviving the 3OT Elite 8 battle, North Carolina went on to win the 2001 championship.

After its deep 2001 tournament run, the Knights returned to the tournament in 2002 at the 2002 NCAA Division I men's soccer tournament. The Knights prevailed over Holy Cross in penalties in the first round. In the Round of 32, they lost 2-1 to St. John's in 2OT.

The last time Fairleigh Dickinson won a tournament game was at the 2012 NCAA Division I men's soccer tournament. In the 2012 NCAA tournament, the Knights made it to the Sweet 16 where they lost to North Carolina 1-0 in overtime.

After a seven-year absence, the Knights returned to the NCAA tournament in 2019 despite a losing record. They upset Saint Francis and LIU winning both games in penalties to win the 2019 NEC tournament title. At the 2019 NCAA tournament, they fell to New Hampshire in the first round 1-0.

Fairleigh Dickinson’s most recent NCAA tournament appearance was in 2022. At the 2022 NCAA Division I men's soccer tournament, the Knights lost in the first round to Maryland 5-2.

In 2023 a 2-1 loss in 2OT to LIU in the NEC tournament semifinals ended their season with an 8-5-5 final record. The 2024 team went 10-4-5 but lost again to LIU in penalties in the championship final. In 2026, FDU went 13-3-3 and would play LIU once again in the NEC tournament finals. They would win 1-0 to clinch the conference's berth to the 2026 tournament.
