= NCAA Division I men's soccer tournament =

College soccer tournament

- Organizer(s): NCAA
- Founded: 1959; 67 years ago
- Region: United States
- Teams: 48
- Current champion(s): Washington (1st title)
- Most championships: Saint Louis (10)
- Broadcaster(s): ESPNU; ESPN+
- Website: ncaa.com/soccer
- 2026

The NCAA Division I men's soccer tournament, sometimes known as the College Cup, is an American intercollegiate soccer tournament conducted by the National Collegiate Athletic Association (NCAA), and determines the Division I men's national champion. The tournament was formally held in 1959, when it was an eight-team tournament. Since then, the tournament has expanded to 48 teams, in which every Division I conference tournament champion is allocated a berth. Among the most successful programs, Saint Louis won 10 titles during dynasty years between 1959 and 1973. Indiana has won 8 titles beginning in 1982, whereas Virginia has won 7 titles beginning in 1989.

Although the tournament is frequently referenced as the "College Cup", the NCAA applies the title only to the semifinal and championship rounds of the tournament proper. Since the tournament began, the semifinal and final fixtures have been held at a neutral site predetermined by the NCAA before starting the regular season.

== Format ==
The NCAA Division I men's soccer tournament is a 48-team, single-elimination tournament. Currently, 23 spots are reserved for the winners of automatic bids.

As of the current 2026 NCAA men's soccer season, the following conferences are expected to be granted automatic qualification:

- America East
- American
- Atlantic Coast
- Atlantic Sun
- Atlantic 10
- Big East
- Big South
- Big Ten
- Big West
- Coastal Athletic Association
- Horizon League
- Ivy League
- Metro
- Missouri Valley
- Mountain West
- NEC
- Ohio Valley
- Pac-12
- Patriot League
- Southern
- Summit League
- Sun Belt
- West Coast

Each conference determines the format for its conference championship, which determines the school that receives its automatic bid. Many use conference tournaments, although three conferences award the championship and automatic bid to the regular-season champion. The remaining 26 teams receive at-large bids. The at-large teams are selected by a committee consisting of representatives from each of the eight regions the NCAA has divided the country into. The committee uses a number of criteria, the most influential supposedly being the Ratings Percentage Index, a mathematical formula designed to objectively compare the results and strength of schedule of all Division I teams.

The top 16 teams are seeded into the bracket and receive first round byes. The other 32 are grouped by geographical proximity. The first four rounds are played on campus sites, with matches being hosted by the higher seed. The College Cup, comprising the semifinal and final matches, is played at a predetermined site.

Washington is the current champion, defeating NC State 3–2 in overtime in the 2025 final.

== List of champions ==
Below is a complete list of winning teams and finals held:

Ed.	Year	Final			Third-place match/semifinalists			City	Stadium
Ed.	Year	Champion	Score	Runner-up	3rd Place	Score	4th Place	City	Stadium
1	1959	Saint Louis (1)	5–2	Bridgeport	CCNY	–	West Chester	Storrs	Memorial Stadium
2	1960	Saint Louis (2)	3–2	Maryland	West Chester	–	Connecticut (Note: The University of Connecticut did not adopt "UConn" as its sole athletic brand until 2013.)	Brooklyn	Brooklyn College Field
3	1961	West Chester (1)	2–0	Saint Louis	Bridgeport	–	Rutgers	St. Louis	Public Schools Stadium
4	1962	Saint Louis (3)	4–3	Maryland	Springfield	–	Michigan State	St. Louis	Francis Field
5	1963	Saint Louis (4)	3–0	Navy	Maryland	–	Army	Piscataway	Rutgers Stadium
6	1964	Navy (1)	1–0	Michigan State	Saint Louis	–	Army	Providence	Brown Stadium
7	1965	Saint Louis (5)	1–0	Michigan State	Navy	–	Army	St. Louis	Francis Field
8	1966	San Francisco (1)	5–2	LIU (Note: This team represented the Brooklyn campus of Long Island University. In 2019, LIU merged the Brooklyn athletic program with the NCAA Division II program of its Post campus. The merged men's soccer team, which now plays as the LIU Sharks, inherited the history and records of the Brooklyn program.)	Michigan State	–	Army	Berkeley	California Memorial
9	1967	Michigan State (1); Saint Louis (6) (Note: Title game was suspended due to bad weather conditions, with both teams sharing the title.)	0–0	—	Navy	–	LIU	St. Louis	Francis Field
10	1968	Maryland (1); Michigan State (2) (Note: Title shared after the game ended in a tie, with no extra time played.)	2–2	—	Brown	–	San Jose State	Atlanta	Grant Field
11	1969	Saint Louis (7)	4–0	San Francisco	Maryland	–	Harvard	San Jose	Spartan Stadium
12	1970	Saint Louis (8)	1–0	UCLA	Hartwick	–	Howard (Note: Disqualified at a later time so the title was declared vacated.)	Edwardsville	Cougar Field, SIUE
13	1971	Howard (0)	3–2	Saint Louis	Harvard	–	San Francisco	Miami	Orange Bowl
14	1972	Saint Louis (9)	4–2	UCLA	Howard	–	Cornell	Miami	Orange Bowl
15	1973	Saint Louis (10)	3–2 (a.e.t.)	UCLA	Brown	–	Clemson	Miami	Orange Bowl
16	1974	Howard (1)	2–1 (a.e.t.)	Saint Louis	Hartwick	3–1	UCLA	St. Louis	Busch Memorial Stadium
17	1975	San Francisco (2)	4–0	SIU Edwardsville	Brown	2–0	Howard	Edwardsville	Cougar Field
18	1976	San Francisco (3)	1–0	Indiana	Hartwick	4–3	Clemson	Philadelphia	Franklin Field
19	1977	Hartwick (1)	2–1	San Francisco	SIU Edwardsville	3–2	Brown	Berkeley	California Memorial
20	1978	San Francisco (0)	2–0	Indiana	Clemson	6–2	Philadelphia Textile (Note: The "Philadelphia College of Textiles & Science", known for sports purposes as "Philadelphia Textile", changed its name to 'Philadelphia University' (PhilaU) in 1999. In 2017, PhilaU merged with Thomas Jefferson University, a healthcare-only institution also in Philadelphia that had no athletic program. The merged university adopted the Thomas Jefferson name and inherited the PhilaU athletic program, which now competes as "Jefferson".)	Tampa	Tampa Stadium
21	1979	SIU Edwardsville (1)	3–2	Clemson	Penn State	2–1	Columbia	Tampa	Tampa Stadium
22	1980	San Francisco (4)	4–3 (a.e.t.)	Indiana	Alabama A&M	2–0	Hartwick	Tampa	Tampa Stadium
23	1981	Connecticut (1)	2–1 (a.e.t.)	Alabama A&M	Eastern Illinois	4–2	Philadelphia Textile	Stanford	Stanford Stadium
24	1982	Indiana (1)	2–1 (a.e.t.)	Duke	Connecticut	–	SIU Edwardsville	Fort Lauderdale	Lockhart Stadium
25	1983	Indiana (2)	1–0 (a.e.t.)	Columbia	Connecticut	–	Virginia	Fort Lauderdale	Lockhart Stadium
26	1984	Clemson (1)	2–1	Indiana	Hartwick	–	UCLA	Seattle	Kingdome
27	1985	UCLA (1)	1–0 (a.e.t.)	American	Hartwick	–	Evansville	Seattle	Kingdome
28	1986	Duke (1)	1–0	Akron	Harvard	–	Fresno State	Tacoma	Tacoma Dome
29	1987	Clemson (2)	2–0	San Diego State	Harvard	–	North Carolina	Clemson	Riggs Field
30	1988	Indiana (3)	1–0	Howard	Portland	–	South Carolina	Bloomington	Bill Armstrong
31	1989	Santa Clara (1); Virginia (1)	1–1 (a.e.t.)	—	Indiana	–	Rutgers	Piscataway	Rutgers Stadium
32	1990	UCLA (2)	0–0 (a.e.t.) (4–3 p)	Rutgers	Evansville	–	NC State	Tampa	USF Soccer Stadium
33	1991	Virginia (2)	0–0 (a.e.t.) (3–1 p)	Santa Clara	Indiana	–	Saint Louis	Tampa	USF Soccer Stadium
34	1992	Virginia (3)	2–0	San Diego	Duke	–	Davidson	Davidson	Richardson Stadium
35	1993	Virginia (4)	2–0	South Carolina	Cal State Fullerton	–	Princeton	Davidson	Richardson Stadium
36	1994	Virginia (5)	1–0	Indiana	UCLA	–	Rutgers	Davidson	Richardson Stadium
37	1995	Wisconsin (1)	2–0	Duke	Virginia	–	Portland	Richmond	Richmond Stadium
38	1996	St. John's (1)	4–1	FIU	Creighton	–	UNC Charlotte (Note: The University of North Carolina at Charlotte did not adopt its current athletic brand name of "Charlotte" until 2000.)	Richmond	Richmond Stadium
39	1997	UCLA (3)	2–0	Virginia	Indiana	–	Saint Louis	Richmond	Richmond Stadium
40	1998	Indiana (4)	3–1	Stanford	Maryland	–	Santa Clara	Richmond	Richmond Stadium
41	1999	Indiana (5)	1–0	Santa Clara	Connecticut	–	UCLA	Charlotte	Ericsson Stadium
42	2000	Connecticut (2)	2–0	Creighton	Indiana	–	SMU	Charlotte	Ericsson Stadium
43	2001	North Carolina (1)	2–0	Indiana	Stanford	–	St. John's	Columbus	Columbus Crew Stadium
44	2002	UCLA (4)	1–0	Stanford	Maryland	–	Creighton	University Park	Gerald J. Ford Stadium
45	2003	Indiana (6)	2–1	St. John's	Maryland	–	Santa Clara	Columbus	Columbus Crew Stadium
46	2004	Indiana (7)	1–1 (a.e.t.) (3–2 p)	UC Santa Barbara	Maryland	–	Duke	Carson	Home Depot Center
47	2005	Maryland (2)	1–0	New Mexico	SMU	–	Clemson	Cary	SAS Soccer Park
48	2006	UC Santa Barbara (1)	2–1	UCLA	Wake Forest	–	Virginia	St. Louis	Hermann Stadium
49	2007	Wake Forest (1)	2–1	Ohio State	Virginia Tech	–	Massachusetts	Cary	SAS Soccer Park
50	2008	Maryland (3)	1–0	North Carolina	St. John's	–	Wake Forest	Frisco	Pizza Hut Park
51	2009	Virginia (6)	0–0 (a.e.t.) (3–2 p)	Akron	Wake Forest	–	North Carolina	Cary	WakeMed Soccer Park
52	2010	Akron (1)	1–0	Louisville	North Carolina	–	Michigan	Santa Barbara	Harder Stadium
53	2011	North Carolina (2)	1–0	Charlotte	UCLA	–	Creighton	Hoover	Regions Park
54	2012	Indiana (8)	1–0	Georgetown	Maryland	–	Creighton	Hoover	Regions Park
55	2013	Notre Dame (1)	2–1	Maryland	New Mexico	–	Virginia	Chester	PPL Park
56	2014	Virginia (7)	0–0 (a.e.t.) (4–2 p)	UCLA	Providence	–	UMBC	Cary	WakeMed Soccer Park
57	2015	Stanford (1)	4–0	Clemson	Akron	–	Syracuse	Kansas City	Children's Mercy Park
58	2016	Stanford (2)	0–0 (a.e.t.) (5–4 p)	Wake Forest	Denver	–	North Carolina	Houston	BBVA Compass Stadium
59	2017	Stanford (3)	1–0 (a.e.t.)	Indiana	North Carolina	–	Akron	Chester	Talen Energy Stadium
60	2018	Maryland (4)	1–0	Akron	Indiana	–	Michigan State	Santa Barbara	Harder Stadium
61	2019	Georgetown (1)	3–3 (a.e.t.) (7–6 p)	Virginia	Stanford	–	Wake Forest	Cary	WakeMed Soccer Park
62	2020	Marshall (1)	1–0 (a.e.t.)	Indiana	North Carolina	–	Pittsburgh	Cary	WakeMed Soccer Park
63	2021	Clemson (3)	2–0	Washington	Notre Dame	–	Georgetown	Cary	WakeMed Soccer Park
64	2022	Syracuse (1)	2–2 (a.e.t.) (7–6 p)	Indiana	Pittsburgh	–	Creighton	Cary	WakeMed Soccer Park
65	2023	Clemson (4)	2–1	Notre Dame	Oregon State	–	West Virginia	Louisville	Lynn Family Stadium
66	2024	Vermont (1)	2–1 (g.g.)	Marshall	Denver	–	Ohio State	Cary	WakeMed Soccer Park
67	2025	Washington (1)	3–2 (g.g.)	NC State	Saint Louis	–	Furman	Cary	WakeMed Soccer Park
68	2026							Cary	WakeMed Soccer Park
69	2027							Cary	WakeMed Soccer Park

== Team titles ==
Teams that have won the National Championship: 10, 8, 7, 4, 3, 2, 1

Team	Titles	Years won
Saint Louis	10	1959, 1960, 1962, 1963, 1965, 1967 (Note: Title game was suspended due to bad weather conditions, with both teams sharing the title.), 1969, 1970, 1972, 1973
Indiana	8	1982, 1983, 1988, 1998, 1999, 2003, 2004, 2012
Virginia	7	1989 (Note: Title shared after the final ended in a tie, with no extra time played.), 1991, 1992, 1993, 1994, 2009, 2014
Clemson	4	1984, 1987, 2021, 2023
Maryland	4	1968, 2005, 2008, 2018
UCLA	4	1985, 1990, 1997, 2002
San Francisco	4	1966, 1975, 1976, 1980
Stanford	3	2015, 2016, 2017
North Carolina	2	2001, 2011
UConn	2	1981, 2000
Michigan State	2	1967, 1968
Washington	1	2025
Vermont	1	2024
Syracuse	1	2022
Marshall	1	2020
Georgetown	1	2019
Notre Dame	1	2013
Akron	1	2010
Wake Forest	1	2007
UC Santa Barbara	1	2006
St. John's	1	1996
Wisconsin	1	1995
Santa Clara	1	1989
Duke	1	1986
SIU Edwardsville	1	1979
Hartwick	1	1977
Howard	1	1974
Navy	1	1964
West Chester	1	1961

== Appearances by team ==
Key

- CH National Champion
- RU National Runner-up
- SF Semifinals
- QF Quarterfinals
- 16 Round of 16
- 1R 32 First Round (3 to 12 teams, 1968 to 1992); Round of 32 (1993 to present)
- ✖ First Round (2001 to present)
- ~~CH~~ ~~SF~~ ~~QF~~ ~~16~~ ~~✖~~ The team achieved the placement shown, but the participation was later vacated. These vacated appearances are not included in the totals columns. Vacated appearances include two national championships, won by San Francisco and Howard.

Starting in 1994, the NCAA began seeding the top 4 teams, which expanded to the top 8 in 1997 and the top 16 in 2003. These teams' seeds are show in superscript next to the result.

School	Conference (as of 2026)	#	16	QF	SF	CG	CH	59	60	61	62	63	64	65	66	66	68	69	70	71	72	73	74	75	76	77	78	79	80	81	82	83	84	85	86	87	88	89	90	91	92	93	94	95	96	97	98	99	00	01	02	03	04	05	06	07	08	09	10	11	12	13	14	15	16	17	18	19	20	21	22	23	24	25	26
Saint Louis	Atlantic 10	52	37	25	17	13	10	CH	CH	RU	CH	CH	SF	CH	QF	CH	16	CH	CH	RU	CH	CH	RU	QF	16	16	16	1R	QF	16		QF	QF		16	1R	16	1R	16	SF	16	16	32	32		SF	32	³16	32	⁶QF	16	⁷QF			¹¹32	✖	32	32			⁸32		32							¹⁰QF	32		✖	SF	✖
Indiana	Big Ten	51	44	29	22	17	8																16		RU	16	RU	QF	RU	QF	CH	CH	RU	16		16	CH	SF	QF	SF	QF	16	¹RU	32	QF	¹SF	⁸CH	²CH	SF	⁴RU	16	⁸CH	²CH	³32	⁷16	⁴32	⁶QF	16	¹⁴16	¹⁶16	¹⁶CH	✖	⁵32	¹⁶16	⁷16	²RU	²SF	⁵16	³RU	¹⁵16	¹³RU	QF	¹⁴16	⁶32	³32
Virginia	ACC	45	30	20	13	9	7											1R										16		16	16	SF	QF	1R	1R	16	QF	CH	QF	CH	CH	CH	³CH	¹SF	32	²RU	²QF	⁶QF	⁵QF	²32	⁶32	16	⁴QF	¹³16	⁴SF	32	¹⁰32	²CH	✖	✖	32	⁸SF	¹⁶CH	32	¹²16	¹¹32	¹⁰16	¹RU			⁴32	⁷16	¹¹16	²32	
UCLA	Big Ten	51	35	22	14	9	4										16		RU	QF	RU	RU	SF	16	16	QF			16			1R	SF	CH	16	QF	16	QF	CH	QF	16	32	SF	³16	32	⁵CH	⁶16	SF	32	16	³CH	¹QF	¹¹16	⁵32	⁸RU	32	✖	⁶QF	⁸QF	¹³SF	⁶32	¹16	²RU	32	32		✖			32	16	¹³32	✖	✖	¹⁶32
Maryland	Big Ten	43	29	20	14	7	4	QF	RU	QF	RU	SF	16			16	CH	SF	1R						1R										1R								16	16	16	16	SF	⁷32		32	²SF	²SF	³SF	¹CH	⁵16	¹³16	²CH	QF	²QF	⁵16	²SF	⁵RU	⁴32	¹⁰QF	¹32	✖	¹¹CH	32	32	✖	32		32	⁴QF	⁶32
Clemson	ACC	39	30	17	10	6	4														16	SF	16	16	SF	QF	SF	RU		16	16	1R	CH	16		CH			1R	1R		16		16		QF	¹QF		²16	⁵QF	QF	✖		SF	⁹16							✖	⁷16	²RU	³QF	⁸32		²QF	¹16	⁸CH	⁶32	⁹CH	⁹16	✖	⁵32
San Francisco	West Coast	31	23	17	7	6	4	QF		QF		QF		QF	CH	16	16	RU	16	SF		QF	QF	CH	CH	RU	~~CH~~	QF	CH	16	QF	QF	16		1R	1R				1R		QF	16										✖	✖	✖		✖									32									
Stanford	ACC	24	18	11	7	5	3				QF																16													1R	1R					32	RU	32	³QF	³SF	RU							16				16	⁶32	⁸CH	⁵CH	⁹CH	⁹QF	⁷SF	⁴16		⁵16	¹⁶QF	¹⁶16	¹²16	²¹32
Michigan State	Big Ten	21	13	10	7	4	2				SF	16	RU	RU	SF	CH	CH	16																																32			✖			✖	⁴32	¹⁴32	16		32	¹¹QF	³QF		✖	⁷QF	SF								¹³32
North Carolina	ACC	33	19	14	9	3	2										1R																			SF	16		16	16		16	32					32	¹QF	⁷CH	32	⁴32	✖	⁴QF	¹⁴32		¹³RU	⁵SF	⁴SF	¹CH	⁹QF	32	QF	⁵16	⁹SF	³SF	⁵32		SF	32	✖	³QF	✖	32	⁷32
UConn	Big East	37	24	15	6	2	2		SF						16						1R	1R	QF	16	QF		QF	16	QF	CH	SF	SF	16	16		16	1R	1R									32	⁴SF	CH	32	⁷QF	32	32	⁸16	✖	³QF	16	✖	¹¹32	³QF	⁴QF	QF		32			32							¹³16	
Akron	Big East	34	20	9	6	4	1								16	QF	16		16	16				16	16							16	1R	1R	RU												32			✖	✖	¹⁵16	✖	⁹QF		¹⁴32	⁵16	¹RU	³CH	16	⁵16	32	✖	⁴SF	32	⁵SF	RU			✖	¹⁶32		32	¹⁴QF	⁴32
Santa Clara	West Coast	21	11	8	5	3	1															16					QF	16										CH	1R	RU		32		QF	32	32	SF	RU		32		SF	✖	32	¹⁰QF	⁷16			✖					32						32					
Duke	ACC	32	17	7	5	3	1														1R								16	1R	RU	16		1R	CH	1R		1R			SF	32	16	RU			³32	¹16	16		✖		SF	⁶32	¹QF	✖	✖	16	32	32						⁶16	⁶16			⁷16	⁷QF	¹⁵32	¹⁰32	16	
Wake Forest	ACC	29	18	10	6	2	1																														1R	16	1R	1R								⁵16		32	¹16	³32	¹16	16	²SF	²CH	¹SF	³SF		32	¹⁵32	¹⁴16	✖	¹QF	²RU	¹QF	¹16	⁴SF	⁵QF	16	✖	¹⁰32	⁸QF		32
SIU Edwardsville	Ohio Valley	17	12	10	4	2	1											16	QF	QF		QF	QF	RU	QF	SF	QF	CH	1R	1R	SF																																32		16							✖	✖		
St. John's	Big East	23	12	6	4	2	1																																		1R	32	32	32	CH	16	⁵QF	16	16	⁸SF	⁴16	⁶RU	⁶QF	16	32		³SF	¹³32		⁹32	✖	32						¹⁶16		32				✖	
Howard	NEC	11	9	6	4	2	1				QF	16							~~SF~~	~~CH~~	SF		CH	SF	16	1R			16								RU	QF								32																													
Navy	Patriot	12	7	5	4	2	1					RU	CH	SF	QF	SF		1R	16	16			1R														1R																									32									✖				
Notre Dame	ACC	25	13	6	3	2	1																														1R					32	32		16					✖	32	⁵16	⁵32	16	¹²QF	¹⁰QF	¹²32	32	⁹32		¹16	³CH	¹16	⁷16	¹³16	¹²32	⁷QF	✖		⁴SF		²RU		32	
Georgetown	Big East	17	10	6	3	2	1																																				32			16													32		³RU	⁶16	⁸QF	³16		¹⁴32	¹³16	³CH	⁸QF	³SF	32	⁴32	⁴32	⁷QF	¹32
Washington	Big Ten	31	17	5	2	2	1														16	16			16		16				1R							1R			16			32	¹16	16	⁴32	16	16	32		¹⁰16	✖		32	32					32	²QF	¹⁴16		¹¹16	✖	✖	⁶QF	⁷QF	²RU	²32		32	CH	¹⁹32
UC Santa Barbara	Big West	15	8	3	2	2	1																																												32	¹¹16	⁹RU	32	CH	¹²16	¹⁵32	16	32	¹⁵16		¹⁰32		¹⁵16				QF		✖			32		
Marshall	Sun Belt	8	5	2	2	2	1																																																													¹¹16	CH	¹⁴32	16	¹16	¹³RU	32	²⁰32
Hartwick	D3	25	20	14	7	1	1				QF		16				QF	QF	SF	QF		QF	SF	16	SF	CH	1R	16	SF			16	SF	SF	QF	16		1R				QF		16										✖									✖	✖											
West Chester	D2	8	7	5	3	1	1	SF	SF	CH		QF		16		16	QF	1R																																																									
Syracuse	ACC	11	5	2	2	1	1																										1R																												16		⁹16	⁶SF	⁸16		¹⁶32	32			³CH	32		✖	32
Vermont	America East	16	5	3	1	1	1																	1R		1R	1R			16								QF	1R										32							32								✖	32					✖	QF	16	CH	¹32	32
Wisconsin	Big Ten	8	5	2	1	1	1																							16										16		QF	32	CH																		32				16									¹⁵32
Creighton	Big East	27	18	12	6	1	-																																		16	32	16	32	SF	⁶16	QF	32	RU	✖	SF	QF	¹⁴16	QF	✖	⁸16	⁷QF		32	²SF	¹²SF	✖	¹²QF	¹²QF	16					32	SF				¹⁷✖
Rutgers	Big Ten	19	11	6	4	1	-		QF	SF																						16				QF		SF	RU	16		32	SF		16	32		32		16		32			✖					16				32							✖				⁹32
Bridgeport	D2	12	6	5	2	1	-	RU		SF		QF	QF		QF	16		1R		1R		1R	1R	1R	1R																																																		
South Carolina	Sun Belt	23	11	4	2	1	-																					16						QF	1R	16	SF	QF	16		1R	RU	32	⁴16		⁴16	16		⁷32	32	✖		✖	✖					⁷16	✖				32	32										¹⁰32
LIU	NEC	18	8	4	2	1	-					16		16	RU	SF				1R	16	1R				1R				QF	QF			1R	16																		✖											✖			✖			32		✖	✖		
NC State	ACC	19	7	4	2	1	-																							1R		1R	1R	1R	16	1R			SF	QF	QF		16									✖		¹⁴32				¹⁵32								✖	32	✖					16	¹⁵RU	32
Alabama A&M	defunct	5	4	3	2	1	-																						SF	RU	1R	QF	16																																										
Columbia	Ivy League	14	11	2	2	1	-												16								16	SF	16	16	16	RU	16	16				16	16	1R		32																								32									
Ohio State	Big Ten	12	5	2	2	1	-																																										32	✖			16	✖		⁵RU	32	⁴32	¹⁶16				32	⁹16							32		¹SF		
New Mexico	defunct	12	5	2	2	1	-																																											32	32		¹³16	²RU	32	✖		✖	✖	¹⁰16	¹³16	⁷SF			32										
Charlotte	American	19	2	2	2	1	-																																	1R	1R		⁴32		SF	32												✖		RU	32	¹³32	¹⁰32	32	¹⁰32		32	32	32	✖		32	✖		¹⁸32
Louisville	ACC	16	7	5	1	1	-																																																	32	✖	✖	¹RU	¹²QF	¹⁰QF	32	¹³16		⁴QF	⁴QF	⁴32	16		✖	✖	32			¹¹32
American	Patriot	9	5	3	1	1	-																				1R	QF					16	RU												⁷QF				16	32		32																32						
San Diego	West Coast	19	7	2	1	1	-																																16		RU	16	32	32			16	32	⁴16	32	✖	¹⁴32						¹¹32			QF		32								✖	✖	16	⁹32	✖
FIU	American	13	3	1	1	1	-																																	1R			32		²RU	⁸32				✖	32	16	✖											✖		32				¹³32	¹⁰16	32			
San Diego State	Pac-12	8	3	1	1	1	-											16												~~QF~~	16					RU	1R	1R																✖	✖										✖										
Brown	Ivy League	27	19	9	4	-	-					QF		QF			SF	16	16	16	16	SF	16	SF	16	SF	16																QF	QF		32	32	16	QF			✖		32	32	⁶32		32	16	16	32														
Harvard	Ivy League	16	9	7	4	-	-										1R	SF	QF	SF	QF		1R										QF		SF	SF							32		16					✖					32	✖	32	¹⁰16																	
Army	Patriot	12	6	5	4	-	-					SF	SF	SF	SF	16	QF		1R	1R	1R	1R		1R																					32																														
SMU	ACC	38	26	14	2	-	-																					16	16			1R	16	QF	QF	16	QF	16	QF	QF	QF		16	²QF	32	³QF	32	16	⁶SF	¹QF	16	✖	⁷16	SF	³32	32			⁵QF	⁶32	✖			16		16	✖	⁸QF			¹¹32	⁶16	¹²QF	⁵32	²32
Jefferson	D2	16	12	8	2	-	-											16	QF			1R	QF	QF	QF	QF	SF	1R	16	SF	QF	1R	1R				16	16																																					
Pittsburgh	ACC	9	6	5	2	-	-				QF			16																																																						32	²SF	⁵QF	SF	✖	²QF		⁸32
Portland	West Coast	21	8	4	2	-	-																														SF	16	1R	16	1R	32		SF				32		16	32	32	32			✖		16							✖		32			32	QF	¹¹32		⁸QF	²³32
Denver	West Coast	14	3	3	2	-	-												QF																																						✖		✖			✖	✖	¹³32	⁶SF		¹⁵32	✖		32	32	32	³SF	32	
Evansville	Missouri Valley	12	6	2	2	-	-																								16		16	SF	16	1R	16	1R	SF	1R	1R				32																												✖		
Penn State	Big Ten	35	23	7	1	-	-												16	QF	16	16	1R	1R	1R	16	1R	SF	QF	16	16		16	QF	QF		1R	1R			16	16	16	32			16	QF		16	QF		¹⁰32	¹¹16				⁷32	¹⁵16			16	32					¹⁵32	16	¹²32					
San Jose State	Mountain West	14	11	6	1	-	-					16	QF		16	QF	SF	QF	16	16	QF		16		QF																						32		⁸32			✖																							
Fresno State	defunct	14	7	3	1	-	-														16										1R		1R	1R	SF	1R	QF	16	16	16		32	32		QF		32																												
West Virginia	Sun Belt	19	5	3	1	-	-								16		1R			1R	1R	1R								QF											1R													32	⁶32	¹⁵16			32	32							32	32		¹¹QF		⁵SF	32	32	¹⁴32
Cal State Fullerton	Big West	10	4	3	1	-	-																	QF											1R							SF	QF		16		⁷32		32														✖	✖		✖									
Cornell	Ivy League	14	6	2	1	-	-													16	SF		16	QF	1R	16			1R															32	32																✖										¹⁴16		32	32	²⁴32
Providence	Big East	12	5	2	1	-	-																									16																						32	✖	✖			32	32		32	¹¹SF		QF			16		16			32		
Virginia Tech	ACC	10	5	2	1	-	-																																													32		¹²32	✖	¹¹SF									QF	32	¹²16	¹⁰16	16	32					
Furman	SoCon	13	4	2	1	-	-																																	16		32						QF	32	✖	16					32				✖			32	✖			32						32	¹⁶SF	
Michigan	Big Ten	10	4	2	1	-	-																																													¹²QF	32				¹¹16		¹⁰SF		32					¹³32	32	¹³16					32	✖	
Oregon State	Pac-12	11	2	2	1	-	-																																												✖	✖											32				32		32	¹QF	⁸32	SF	✖	✖	²²32
UMass	Summit	6	2	2	1	-	-																																											32						SF	✖									✖			32				QF		
Princeton	Ivy League	13	2	1	1	-	-																			1R		16										1R				SF		32				32		32								✖	✖								✖			✖			✖	³32	
Springfield	D3	2	2	1	1	-	-				SF	16																																																															
UMBC	America East	5	1	1	1	-	-																																									32											32		32	¹⁶32	SF												
Davidson	Atlantic 10	2	1	1	1	-	-																																		SF											✖																							
CCNY	D3	1	1	1	1	-	-	SF																																																																			
California	ACC	21	9	4	-	-	-		QF																	16				1R		1R		1R	1R										32					✖	16	32	32	⁷QF	¹³16	32	16		⁶QF			⁴QF	¹⁵16			✖		✖							✖
Fairleigh Dickinson	NEC	20	10	3	-	-	-					16	16			16	16						1R	16							1R	QF	QF				16	1R												QF	32	✖					✖				16							✖			✖			✖	✖
South Florida	American	22	6	3	-	-	-											16	1R	1R		16		1R							1R														32	QF	32			32				32		16	⁸QF	32	✖	⁷QF	32	✖		¹⁴32	✖			✖			32				
James Madison	Sun Belt	16	5	3	-	-	-															1R			1R																1R	32	QF	QF	32				32	✖				✖						¹⁴16			✖				QF	✖	32			16			
Penn	Ivy League	12	4	3	-	-	-											QF	1R	16	QF	QF				1R																									32						✖		32			✖									32		⁶32		
Trinity (CT)	D3	4	4	3	-	-	-						QF	QF		QF	16																																																										
Air Force	Mountain West	14	9	2	-	-	-						16	16			QF	16			16					16								16							1R	QF				32															✖					✖	16		32						
William & Mary	CAA	16	8	2	-	-	-																						QF			16				1R					16	32		16	⁴QF	32	16	32	32		16						32		¹²16			✖				✖									
Cleveland State	Horizon	12	8	2	-	-	-											QF	16				16	16		QF	16	16	16																																✖										✖			✖	✖
Seton Hall	Big East	14	7	2	-	-	-																												16	16	QF		1R	16	16									16	✖	✖	✖	32															⁶QF		✖			32	
Dartmouth	Ivy League	18	6	2	-	-	-						16													1R	1R												QF		QF					16			32				✖	¹⁶32		✖	¹⁶16	✖	16	✖			32	32	32	¹⁵32									
Boston College	ACC	15	5	2	-	-	-																								16								1R										32	✖	⁵QF		¹⁵16			¹32	32	16	✖	⁴32	✖			QF	32			32							
Tulsa	American	14	5	2	-	-	-																																	1R												32	QF			¹⁶32	32	⁸QF	32		¹¹16		✖	32	✖					⁶16	¹⁵16				✖
Loyola (MD)	Patriot	9	4	2	-	-	-																												QF	QF						16								16	✖					32	⁹32	✖												✖					
Northwestern	Big Ten	9	4	2	-	-	-																																														32		QF	⁹32	QF	⁹16		✖	16	✖	✖												
East Stroudsburg	D2	3	2	2	-	-	-						QF	QF						1R																																																							
Boston University	Patriot	16	7	1	-	-	-																						16					QF	16		16		16	1R		16	²16	32	32	32							32			✖	32							✖								✖			
UNC Greensboro	SoCon	13	7	1	-	-	-																																			32	32	32	³32		16						⁸16	16	16		16		✖										✖		¹²QF			16	
Temple	American	7	6	1	-	-	-								QF	16	16					1R			16		16							16																																									
Kentucky	Sun Belt	15	5	1	-	-	-																																									32	16	32		32									✖		✖	✖	¹⁶32		³QF	32	16	⁹16	¹16	32		✖	
George Mason	Atlantic 10	11	4	1	-	-	-																								QF		1R	16	16	1R		1R	1R						16										✖		32					32													
Yale	Ivy League	8	4	1	-	-	-															16													1R			16		QF								16						✖														✖				32			
Rhode Island	Atlantic 10	13	3	1	-	-	-														1R				1R	16		QF																32	32			32	16			✖		✖	32												✖	✖							
Adelphi	D2	10	3	1	-	-	-					16						1R							1R		1R									QF	1R		16	1R	1R														✖																				
Colgate	Patriot	8	3	1	-	-	-	QF							16																																									✖	✖			✖					✖	16	32								
UIC	Missouri Valley	8	3	1	-	-	-																																									32	16						32	QF	16								✖	✖	✖								
Cortland	D2	3	3	1	-	-	-		QF				16		16																																																												
Ohio	defunct	3	3	1	-	-	-							16						16	QF																																																						
St. Francis Brooklyn	defunct	10	2	1	-	-	-																1R		16	1R	QF				1R																															✖	✖		✖	✖			32						
VCU	Atlantic 10	9	2	1	-	-	-																																							32	32	32			⁸32	⁹16	¹⁶QF								¹⁴32	✖				¹⁶32									
UAB	American	8	2	1	-	-	-																																				32					QF	32	16					✖					¹¹32	✖		✖												
Hartford	D3	4	2	1	-	-	-																																	16	1R				QF			32																											
Saint Mary's	West Coast	4	2	1	-	-	-																																																			✖		QF							⁸16	¹²32							
Brooklyn College	D3	3	2	1	-	-	-		QF																												16		1R																																				
NYU	D3	3	2	1	-	-	-			QF								16			1R																																																						
Brockport	D3	2	2	1	-	-	-			QF							16																																																										
Loyola Marymount	West Coast	9	1	1	-	-	-																																											✖	32	¹³32	32					✖				✖						✖	32			QF			
Bradley	Missouri Valley	7	1	1	-	-	-																																										32		✖			✖		QF			✖	32		32													
Charleston	CAA	6	1	1	-	-	-																																				QF	32	32								32						32																✖
Fordham	Atlantic 10	6	1	1	-	-	-																																						32																		✖		✖	QF			32				✖		
Drake	Missouri Valley	3	1	1	-	-	-																																																		✖	QF						32											
Buffalo State	D3	2	1	1	-	-	-									QF			1R																																																								
Williams	D3	1	1	1	-	-	-	QF																																																																			
Coastal Carolina	Sun Belt	17	5	-	-	-	-																																		16			32						✖	32	16	✖	✖					✖	32	16	16	32	32	32	16		32	32						
Bowling Green	Missouri Valley	9	4	-	-	-	-														16	16																			1R			32	16	16																							✖	32					✖
Hofstra	CAA	10	3	-	-	-	-										1R																																				32	✖	32									32						16	✖	¹⁴16	⁷32	16	
Butler	Big East	9	3	-	-	-	-																																					16		32	16			✖								¹²32	¹³32						¹⁵32	16		✖							
New Hampshire	America East	8	3	-	-	-	-																																				32																							16	✖	32	32	¹⁶16	32	⁸16			
UC Irvine	Big West	8	3	-	-	-	-																																																		¹⁴16	¹⁶32		⁸32		¹²16	16				32					✖		✖	
Western Michigan	Missouri Valley	6	3	-	-	-	-																																													✖														¹⁰16					16	16	32	32	
Colorado College	D3	3	3	-	-	-	-								16	16								16																																																			
Old Dominion	Sun Belt	14	2	-	-	-	-																															1R		1R											32	32	¹²32	¹⁰32	16	16			32	32	✖	32	32			32									
UCF	Sun Belt	10	2	-	-	-	-																																												✖	✖	32						32	32							¹⁴32	⁹16	16			¹²32		32	
UNLV	Mountain West	6	2	-	-	-	-																									16	1R	16		~~16~~	1R																										✖		32										
Appalachian State	defunct	4	2	-	-	-	-																	1R		16	16		1R																																														
Marquette	Big East	4	2	-	-	-	-																																							32															⁷32	⁹16							16						
Chico State	D2	2	2	-	-	-	-													16			16																																																				
Missouri State	American	10	1	-	-	-	-																																							32		⁸32										✖										32	16	✖	✖	32	¹⁵32		32
Bucknell	Patriot	8	1	-	-	-	-																16	1R	1R																														32			32	✖				✖										✖		
Cal State Northridge	Big West	7	1	-	-	-	-																																												✖	¹⁶32	✖	¹⁵16							✖	¹⁵32			✖										
Seattle	West Coast	7	1	-	-	-	-																																																							32		¹¹16		32		32		✖		✖	✖		
George Washington	Atlantic 10	6	1	-	-	-	-																1R			1R	1R											16													✖		32																						
Lafayette	Patriot	6	1	-	-	-	-																																					16			32					✖		✖							✖													✖	
Lehigh	Patriot	6	1	-	-	-	-																																										32		✖				¹⁶16									✖				✖							✖
Kansas City	Summit	6	1	-	-	-	-																																											32		✖					✖																16	32	¹²32
Xavier	Big East	5	1	-	-	-	-																																																				✖	✖	32		16									✖			
Lipscomb	ASUN	5	1	-	-	-	-																																																											✖	16			✖	⁹32	✖			
Grand Canyon	Mountain West	5	1	-	-	-	-																																																												✖		32	✖				16	32
High Point	Big South	5	1	-	-	-	-																																																												✖		32		32	✖		¹⁰16	
Drexel	CAA	4	1	-	-	-	-					16									1R																																								✖	✖													
Northern Illinois	Horizon	4	1	-	-	-	-															16																																	32					32										32					
Dayton	Atlantic 10	4	1	-	-	-	-																																																		✖							32								✖	⁵16		
Saint Joseph's	Atlantic 10	3	1	-	-	-	-								16					1R	1R																																																						
Oneonta	D3	3	1	-	-	-	-															16	1R	1R																																																			
Bryant	America East	3	1	-	-	-	-																																																																	✖		¹¹16	32
Middlebury	D3	2	1	-	-	-	-							16					1R																																																								
Eastern Illinois	Ohio Valley	2	1	-	-	-	-																							~~SF~~	1R	16																																											
Towson	defunct	2	1	-	-	-	-																																											32					¹⁵16																				
Albany	America East	2	1	-	-	-	-																																																										¹⁴16	32									
Franklin & Marshall	D3	1	1	-	-	-	-						16																																																														
Baltimore	defunct	1	1	-	-	-	-							16																																																													
Ithaca	D3	1	1	-	-	-	-							16																																																													
North Texas	defunct	1	1	-	-	-	-																								16																																												
Central Connecticut	NEC	1	1	-	-	-	-																																																	16																			
Milwaukee	Horizon	10	-	-	-	-	-																					1R	1R										1R											✖	32	32	32	32								✖							✖						
Oakland	Horizon	8	-	-	-	-	-																																												✖	✖				32	✖		✖				32	✖						✖					
Rider	Metro	6	-	-	-	-	-																																							32	32																	✖	✖		✖					✖			
Mercer	SoCon	6	-	-	-	-	-																																											✖															✖	✖		✖		✖		✖			
Winthrop	Big South	6	-	-	-	-	-																																												✖				✖		✖	✖			32			✖											
Western Illinois	Ohio Valley	6	-	-	-	-	-																																														✖	✖	✖			✖		✖	✖														
Monmouth	CAA	6	-	-	-	-	-																																																✖			32	✖	32			✖						32						
Elon	CAA	6	-	-	-	-	-																																																					✖	✖	32		32							✖			✖	
Delaware	Summit	5	-	-	-	-	-										1R		1R																																									32		✖			✖										
Loyola Chicago	Atlantic 10	5	-	-	-	-	-																																																✖		✖			✖					32			✖							
UNC Wilmington	CAA	5	-	-	-	-	-																																																			32					32			32	✖								32
Memphis	American	4	-	-	-	-	-																																			32											✖																		✖	32			
Robert Morris	Horizon	4	-	-	-	-	-																																			32	32											✖																			✖		
Fairfield	Metro	4	-	-	-	-	-																																																32		✖			✖						✖									
UC Davis	Mountain West	4	-	-	-	-	-																																																	✖	32											¹⁴32					✖		
Florida Gulf Coast	ASUN	4	-	-	-	-	-																																																					✖	✖		✖		32										
North Florida	ASUN	4	-	-	-	-	-																																																									✖									✖	✖	✖
Omaha	Summit	4	-	-	-	-	-																																																											✖			32			✖			32
Green Bay	Horizon	3	-	-	-	-	-																									1R																										✖														✖			
Richmond	defunct	3	-	-	-	-	-																																1R								32				✖																								
Cal Poly	Pac-12	3	-	-	-	-	-																																					32													32							✖											
Cincinnati	defunct	3	-	-	-	-	-																																								32					✖			✖																				
Saint Peter's	Metro	3	-	-	-	-	-																																													32				✖			✖																
Marist	Metro	3	-	-	-	-	-																																														✖	✖																✖					
Stony Brook	CAA	3	-	-	-	-	-																																															32				✖		✖															
Campbell	CAA	3	-	-	-	-	-																																																	✖											~~✖~~	32		✖					
Liberty	SoCon	3	-	-	-	-	-																																																	✖				✖															✖
East Tennessee State	SoCon	3	-	-	-	-	-																																																				✖			✖			✖										
Georgia State	Sun Belt	3	-	-	-	-	-																																																					✖							✖			32					
Pacific	West Coast	3	-	-	-	-	-																																																										32	32	32								
Southern Connecticut	D2	2	-	-	-	-	-											1R		1R																																																							
Jacksonville	ASUN	2	-	-	-	-	-																																								~~16~~										32													✖					
Gonzaga	Pac-12	2	-	-	-	-	-																																											✖						✖																			
Northeastern	CAA	2	-	-	-	-	-																																												32										32														
Binghamton	America East	2	-	-	-	-	-																																													32			✖																				
Stetson	ASUN	2	-	-	-	-	-																																															✖				✖																	
Gardner–Webb	Big South	2	-	-	-	-	-																																																32																		32		
Sacramento State	Big West	2	-	-	-	-	-																																																			32	32																
Cal State Bakersfield	Big West	2	-	-	-	-	-																																																					✖															✖
Quinnipiac	Metro	2	-	-	-	-	-																																																							✖									✖				
Radford	Big South	2	-	-	-	-	-																																																									✖	✖										
Villanova	Big East	2	-	-	-	-	-																																																										✖					32					
Central Arkansas	ASUN	2	-	-	-	-	-																																																											✖	✖								
UC Riverside	Pac-12	2	-	-	-	-	-																																																												✖				✖				
Iona	Metro	2	-	-	-	-	-																																																													✖					✖		
California Baptist	Pac-12	2	-	-	-	-	-																																																																✖	32			
Montclair State	D3	1	-	-	-	-	-											1R																																																									
RPI	D3	1	-	-	-	-	-											1R																																																									
WPI	D3	1	-	-	-	-	-												1R																																																								
La Salle	Atlantic 10	1	-	-	-	-	-																				1R																																																
Illinois State	defunct	1	-	-	-	-	-																																1R																																				
Detroit Mercy	Horizon	1	-	-	-	-	-																																						32																														
Charleston Southern	defunct	1	-	-	-	-	-																																							32																													
IU Indy	Horizon	1	-	-	-	-	-																																										32																										
Holy Cross	Patriot	1	-	-	-	-	-																																												✖																								
DePaul	Big East	1	-	-	-	-	-																																																	✖																			
Wofford	SoCon	1	-	-	-	-	-																																																			✖																	
Niagara	Metro	1	-	-	-	-	-																																																						✖														
Utah Valley	Big West	1	-	-	-	-	-																																																									✖											
Presbyterian	Big South	1	-	-	-	-	-																																																											✖									
NJIT	America East	1	-	-	-	-	-																																																													✖							
Wright State	Horizon	1	-	-	-	-	-																																																													32							
Florida Atlantic	American	1	-	-	-	-	-																																																																			✖	
Lindenwood	Ohio Valley	1	-	-	-	-	-																																																																			✖	
Siena	Metro	1	-	-	-	-	-																																																																			✖	
Houston Christian	Ohio Valley	1	-	-	-	-	-																																																																				✖
Longwood	Big South	1	-	-	-	-	-																																																																				✖
Sacred Heart	Metro	1	-	-	-	-	-																																																																				✖

== See also ==
- List of NCAA Division I men's soccer programs
- NCAA Division I men's soccer tournament appearances by school
- NCAA Division II men's soccer tournament
- NCAA Division III men's soccer tournament
- NCAA Women's Soccer Championship
- NAIA national men's soccer championship
- Intercollegiate Soccer Football Association (ISFA) – declared the annual national champion (1927–1958)
- Intercollegiate Association Football League (IAFL) – declared the annual national champion (1911–1926)
- Pre-NCAA Soccer Champions

== Highest attendances ==
The highest recorded attendance for championship games are listed below:

- 22,512 – Saint Louis (5) vs. SIU Edwardsville (1), Busch Stadium, St. Louis Oct. 30 1980
- 21,319 – Wisconsin (1) vs. Portland (0) / Duke (3) vs. Virginia (2), Richmond, Virginia (NCAA semifinals) Dec. 8, 1995
- 20,874 – St. John's (NY) (4) vs. FIU (1), Richmond, Virginia (NCAA final) Dec. 15, 1996
- 20,703 – Wisconsin (2) vs. Duke (0), Richmond, Virginia (NCAA final) Dec. 10, 1995
- 20,269 – St. John's (NY) (2) vs. Creighton (1) / FIU (4) vs. Charlotte (0), Richmond, Virginia (NCAA semifinals) Dec. 13, 1996
- 20,143 – UCLA (2) vs. Virginia (0), Richmond, Virginia (NCAA final) Dec. 14, 1997
- 20,112 – Saint Louis (1) vs. SIU Edwardsville (0), Busch Stadium, St. Louis Nov. 9, 1973

Numbers in parentheses indicate goals scored by participating teams.
