= 1996 NCAA Division I men's soccer tournament =

Men's College Cup (semifinals & final)

Tournament details
- Country: United States
- Teams: 32

Final positions
- Champions: St. John's (NY) (1st title)
- Runners-up: Florida International (1st title game)

Tournament statistics
- Matches played: 31
- Goals scored: 99 (3.19 per match)
- Attendance: 85,915 (2,771 per match)
- Top goal scorer(s): Alen Kozić, Florida International (3)

The 1996 NCAA Division I Men's Soccer Tournament was the 37th organized men's college soccer tournament by the National Collegiate Athletic Association, to determine the top college soccer team in the United States. The St. John's Red Storm won their first national title by defeating the Florida International Panthers in the championship game, 4–1. The semifinals on December 13, 1996, and the final on December 15, 1996, were played in Richmond, Virginia, at Richmond Stadium for the second straight year. All the other matches were played at the home field of the higher seeded team.

== National Seeds ==
National Seeds
Seed	School	Record
#1	Washington	14–2–1
#2	Florida International	13–4–2
#3	UNC Greensboro	21–1
#4	William & Mary	18–2–1

== Early rounds ==
First round
1	Washington (2OT)	2
Santa Clara	1
California	1
Fresno State	2
Cal State Fullerton	2
UCLA	1
SMU	0
Creighton	2
Virginia	0
George Mason	1
Fordham	1
St. John's (NY)	5
James Madison	1
Maryland (OT)	2
Army	1
4	William & Mary (4OT)	3
3	UNC Greensboro	0
Notre Dame	1
Charlotte	3
College of Charleston	1
Boston U.	2
Harvard	3
Hartford (OT)	3
Rhode Island	2
Bowling Green	4
Detroit	0
Indiana	4
Evansville	1
Rutgers (OT)	2
Cornell	1
South Florida	1
2	FIU	6

Second round
1	Washington	1
Fresno State	2
Cal State Fullerton	0
Creighton (pen.)	0
George Mason	1
St. John's (NY)	2
Maryland	0
4	William & Mary	3
Notre Dame	0
Charlotte	1
Harvard	2
Hartford (OT)	3
Bowling Green	0
Indiana	2
Rutgers	0
2	FIU	2

Third round
Fresno State	0
Creighton	2
St. John's (NY) (OT)	2
4	William & Mary	1
Charlotte	3
Hartford	0
Indiana	0
2	FIU	1

Semifinals
Creighton	1
St. John's (NY)	2
Charlotte	0
2	FIU	4

Championship; Richmond Stadium; Richmond, Virginia
St. John's (NY)	4
2	FIU	1

== Final ==
December 15, 1996

St. John's (NY)	4–1	Florida International
Van Saun 27'; Krakowiak 28'; Hickey 68'; Kulego 89'		Moleka 64'

Richmond Stadium, Richmond, Virginia
Attendance: 20,874
