= San Jose State Spartans men's soccer =

- Founded: 1927; 99 years ago
- University: San Jose State University
- Head coach: Simon Tobin (12th. season)
- Conference: MWC; I Division
- Location: San Jose, California, US
- Stadium: Spartan Soccer Complex (capacity: ~1,560)
- Nickname: Spartans
- Colors: Gold, white, and blue
Home	Away

NCAA tournament appearances
- 1963, 1964, 1966, 1967, 1968, 1969, 1970, 1971, 1972, 1974, 1976, 1998, 2000, 2003

Conference tournament championships
- 1939, 1940, 1941, 1942, 1964, 1967, 1968, 1969, 1970, 1971, 1972, 1974, 2000, 2003

The San Jose State Spartans men's soccer is the intercollegiate varsity soccer team representing the San Jose State University (SJSU), located in San Jose, California. The team is a member of the Mountain West athletic conference of NCAA Division I.

The Spartans' current head coach is Simon Tobin, who is in charge since 2023. The team play their home matches at the Spartan Soccer Complex, which also serves as home venue to the women's team.

Established in 1927, the team had a 1–3–2 record in their first year, being coached by A.S. Cakebread. The program has made fourteen NCAA championship appearances (the most recent in 2003). Championships won include five CISC, seven PSC, and two MPSF conference titles, The Spartans also were six-time finalists of the WAC tournament.

The SJSU men's soccer team went an undefeated 18–0–1 during the 2000 regular season, finishing with a 20–1–1 overall record. The Spartans concluded the regular season as the No. 1-ranked team in the country. The Spartans have also an overall NCAA D1 tournament record of 7–14.

== Players ==
=== Current roster ===
As of December 2025

Note: Flags indicate national team as defined under FIFA eligibility rules; some limited exceptions apply. Players may hold more than one non-FIFA nationality.

No.	Pos.	Nation	Player
0	GK	USA	Ronin Axelson
1	GK	USA	Edgar Guerra
2	DF	USA	Ruben Flores
3	MF	USA	Dane Pendleton
4	DF	USA	Kaylob Walker
5	DF	USA	Niklas Dossmann
6	MF	USA	Gilberto Rivera
7	MF	USA	Angel Fernandez
8	MF	ENG	Cameron Cook
9	FW	USA	Arnold Matshazi
10	MF	USA	Angel Iniguez
11	FW	USA	Jordi Tortell
12	DF	USA	Diego Nieves
13	MF	USA	Daniel Fregoso
14	FW	USA	Angel Gutierrez
15	FW	USA	Miliano Suarez

No.	Pos.	Nation	Player
16	MF	USA	Neo Ruiz
17	FW	USA	Anthony Guzman
18	DF	USA	Javier Lopez
19	MF	NOR	Jesper Bakli
20	MF	USA	Fernando Duarte
21	FW	USA	Jalen Scott
22	DF	USA	Samuel Navarrete
23	FW	USA	Amir Anwary
24	FW	USA	Jason Buezo
25	DF	USA	Emmanuel Garcia
26	FW	USA	Eamon Fakhri
27	GK	USA	Jorge Arellano
28	GK	USA	Colin Farley
29	DF	USA	Tomislav Jozinovic
31	DF	USA	Tiko Moodie

key

- – member of the SJSU Athletics Hall of Fame

=== Players in the pros ===
SJSU players that play / have played at professional levels are:

Nat.	Player	Pro	Teams	Ref.
(United States)	Mani Hernandez	1974	San Jose Earthquakes, Detroit Lightning, San Francisco Fog	
(United States)	Tony Suffle	1974	Denver Dynamos, San Jose Earthquakes, Minnesota Kicks	
(United States)	Gary St. Clair	1975	San Jose Earthquakes, San Diego Jaws	
(United States)	Jim Zylker	1975	San Jose Earthquakes, San Antonio Thunder	
(Scotland)	John Smillie	1977	San Jose Earthquakes, Cincinnati Kids, San Francisco Fog	
(United States)	Paul Coffee	1979	Chicago Sting, Philadelphia Fever	
(United States)	Ismael Perez	1979	San Jose Earthquakes	
(United States)	Steve Ryan	1979	San Jose Earthquakes, Detroit Lightning, New Jersey Rockets	
(United States)	Giulio Bernardi	1982	Georgia Generals, Pennsylvania Stoners, Houston Dynamos	
(United States)	C. J. Brown	1998	Chicago Fire	
(United States)	Isaias Bardales Jr.	2001	Los Angeles Galaxy, Puerto Rico Islanders	
(United States)	Ryan Suarez	2001	Dallas Burn, Los Angeles Galaxy, Chivas USA	
(United States)	Frank Sanfilippo	2004	Rochester Raging Rhinos, Carolina RailHawks, Tampa Bay Rowdies	
(Ukraine)	Andriy Budnyi	2006	Obolon Kyiv, Carolina RailHawks, Syracuse Silver Knights	
(El Salvador)	Junior Burgos	2012	Toronto FC, Atlanta Silverbacks, El Salvador national team	
(United States)	Enrique Montano	2015	Louisville City, Tulsa Roughnecks	
(Bosnia and Herzegovina)	Nedin Tucaković	2017	NK Podgrmeč, FK Sarajevo	
(United States)	Beau Leroux	2025	San Jose Earthquakes	

== Coaches ==
=== Current staff ===
As of 23 December 2025

Position	Name
Head coach	Simon Tobin
Assoc. head coach	Jesus Sanchez
Assist. coach	Jamie Reid
Assist. coach	Marcos Oliveira

=== Coaching history ===
As of December 2025

#	Nat.	Name	Seas.	Tenure	Rec.
1	(United States)	Aarian S. Cakebread	4	1927–30	12–14–4
2		Charles L. Walker	5	1931–35	10–29–4
3	(United States)	H.C. McDonald	4	1936–39	26–15–9
4	(England)	Gordon Maybury	2	1940–41	11–0–4
5	(United States)	Roy Diedericksen	1	1942	6–0–0
6	(United States)	Julius Menendez	36	1954–89	295–205–45
7	(United States)	Gary St. Clair	24	1990–2013	217–211–41
8	(England)	Simon Tobin	12	2014–present	75–86–13 (Note: Statistics as of 2024 season.)

== Team statistics ==
=== Records ===
key

- – member of the SJSU Athletics Hall of Fame

Top scorers

#	Nat.	Player	Goals	Tenure
1	(United States)	Ismael Perez	75	1975–78
2	(United States)	Mani Hernandez	68	1968–69, 71
3	(United States)	Giulio Bernardi	64	1978–81
4	(United States)	Al Korbus	49	1963–64
5	(United States)	Jim Zylker	47	1971–72

Most assistances

#	Nat.	Player	Assist.	Tenure
1	(United States)	Joe Pimentel	33	1979–82
2	(United States)	Mani Hernandez	29	1968–69, 71
3	(United States)	Giulio Bernardi	27	1978–81
4	(United States)	Jim Zylker	26	1971–72
5	(United States)	Tony Suffle	25	1970–73

=== NCAA appearances ===
SJSU's appearances in NCAA D-I tournament are listed below:

Key

- a.e.t. – Match went to extra time
- p – Match decided by a penalty shootout after extra time

Season	Stage	Rival	Res.	Score
1963	First round	San Francisco	L	0–2
1964	First round	Air Force	W	5–2
1964	Quarterfinals	Saint Louis	L	0–5
1966	First round	San Francisco	L	1–2
1967	First round	San Francisco	W	4–3
1967	Quarterfinals	Saint Louis	L	3–4
1968	Second round	UCLA	W	3–1
1968	Quarterfinals	Air Force	W	1–0
1968	Semifinals	Maryland	L	3–4
1969	Second round	Air Force	W	1–0
1969	Quarterfinals	San Francisco	L	1–3
1970	Second round	Denver	L	1–2
1971	Second round	San Francisco	L	2–3
1972	Second round	Fresno State	W	4–0
1972	Quarterfinals	UCLA	L	1–3
1974	Second round	UCLA	L	2–3
1976	Second round	Washington	W	4–1
1976	Quarterfinals	San Francisco	L	0–5
1998	First round	Stanford	L	2–3
2000	First round	Indiana	L	0–4
2003	First round	California	L	0–2

== Titles ==
=== Conference ===
Conference	Titles	Winning years
California Intercollegiate Soccer Conference	5	1939, 1940, 1941, 1942, 1964
Pacific Soccer Conference	7	1967, 1968, 1969, 1970, 1971, 1972, 1974
Mountain Pacific Sports Federation	2	2000, 2003
