= 1966 NCAA soccer tournament =

1966 College Cup

Tournament details
- Country: United States
- Venue(s): California Memorial Stadium; Berkeley, California
- Teams: 16

Final positions
- Champions: San Francisco (1st title)
- Runners-up: Long Island
- Semifinalists: Army; Michigan State

Tournament statistics
- Matches played: 15
- Goals scored: 59 (3.93 per match)

Awards
- Best player: Sandor Hites, San Francisco (offensive)

The 1966 NCAA soccer tournament was the eighth annual tournament organized by the National Collegiate Athletic Association to determine the national champion of men's college soccer among its members in the United States.

The tournament final was played at the California Memorial Stadium in Berkeley, California on December 3.

San Francisco won their first title, defeating Long Island in the final, 5–2.

The most outstanding offensive player of the tournament was Sandor Hites of San Francisco.

== Qualifying ==
Qualified teams
School	Record	Appearance	Last Bid
Akron	10–2	1st	Never
Army	8–2–2	4th	1965
Bridgeport	8–3	4th	1964
Colgate	8–1	2nd	1959
Colorado College	6–2	1st	Never
Connecticut	8–4	2nd	1960
Cortland State	8–2–1	3rd	1964
Long Island	11–1–1	3rd	1965
Michigan State	7–1	5th	1965
Navy	10–0–1	4th	1965
St. Joseph's	9–2	1st	Never
Saint Louis	10–0	8th	1965
San Francisco	9–0–1	5th	1965
San Jose State	9–1	3rd	1964
Temple	11–0–1	1st	Never
West Virginia	13–1	1st	Never

== Bracket ==
First Round
Bridgeport	3
Colgate	1
Long Island	6
Cortland State	1
Michigan State	2
Akron	0
Temple	4
West Virginia	0
Navy	4
St. Joseph's	1
Connecticut	1
Army	2
Saint Louis	5
Colorado College	1
San Jose State	1
San Francisco	2

Quarterfinals
Bridgeport	0
Long Island	1
Michigan State	3
Temple	1
Navy	1
Army	3
Saint Louis	1
San Francisco (4OT)	2

Semifinals
Long Island (4OT, CK)	2
Michigan State	2
Army	0
San Francisco	2

Championship
Long Island	2
San Francisco	5

- Long Island defeated Michigan State per the rules, as at the time after 4 overtime periods the team with the most corner-kicks (CK) was declared the winner.

== Final ==
December 3, 1966

Long Island	2–5	San Francisco

California Memorial Stadium, Berkeley, California
Attendance: 5,000

== See also ==
- 1966 NAIA Soccer Championship
