= Army Black Knights men's soccer =

American college soccer team

- Founded: 1921; 105 years ago
- University: United States Military Academy
- Head coach: Brian Plotkin (1st season)
- Conference: Patriot
- Location: West Point, New York, US
- Stadium: Malek Stadium at Clinton Field (capacity: 1,500)
- Nickname: Black Knights
- Colors: Black, gold, and gray
Home	Away

Pre-tournament ISFA/ISFL championships
- 1945

NCAA tournament College Cup
- 1963, 1964, 1965, 1966

NCAA tournament Quarterfinals
- 1963, 1964, 1965, 1966, 1968

NCAA tournament Round of 16
- 1963, 1964, 1965, 1966, 1967, 1968

NCAA tournament Round of 32
- 1963, 1964, 1965, 1966, 1967, 1968, 1970, 1971, 1972, 1973, 1975, 1996

NCAA tournament appearances
- 1963, 1964, 1965, 1966, 1967, 1968, 1970, 1971, 1972, 1973, 1975, 1996

Conference tournament championships
- 1991, 1993, 1996

Conference regular season championships
- 1992, 1996

The Army Black Knights men's soccer program represents the United States Military Academy (West Point) in all NCAA Division I men's college soccer competitions. Founded in 1921, the Black Knights compete in the Patriot League. The Black Knights play in the Patriot League and are coached by Russell Payne, a former goalkeeper who played in the A-League (the United Soccer League's second division predecessor). Army plays their home matches at Clinton Field in West Point, New York.

In 1945, Army was declared co-national champions by the Intercollegiate Soccer Football Association, the predecessor to the NCAA, making it the only season Army won a national championship of any kind in men's college soccer. Much of the program's success in NCAA came in the 1960s, when they were regulars in the NCAA Division I Men's Soccer Championship. From 1963 until 1967 Army reached the College Cup (final four) for four consecutive seasons, although the program never managed to reach the national championship. The program regularly made appearances through the mid-1970s before having a dip in form. The program once again qualified for the NCAA Tournament in 1996, but have failed to qualify since then.

Several notable military personnel and professional soccer players played for the Black Knights including Winston Boldt.

== Roster ==
As of 19 Sep 2024

Note: Flags indicate national team as defined under FIFA eligibility rules; some limited exceptions apply. Players may hold more than one non-FIFA nationality.

No.	Pos.	Nation	Player
00	GK	USA	Blair Camargo
0	GK	USA	Aiden Rice
1	GK	USA	Michael Guiry
2	DF	USA	Kasem Minzey
3	DF	USA	Owen Ennis
4	MF	USA	Eric Lusskin
5	DF	USA	Kelly Cooper
6	MF	USA	Colin McCarthy
7	MF	USA	Riley Cullum
8	MF	USA	Reef McGee
9	FW	USA	Jack Drabenstott
10	FW	USA	Jubril Bamgbala
11	MF	USA	Gage Lyons
12	MF	USA	Skyler Smith
13	DF	USA	Owen Mejia
14	FW	USA	Jacob Lee

No.	Pos.	Nation	Player
15	DF	USA	Niko Kapustin
16	MF	USA	Justin Davidyock
17	MF	USA	Jack Meyer
18	MF	USA	Ryan Behrmann
19	FW	USA	Kai Thomas
20	FW	USA	Ronald Zhai
21	MF	USA	
22	DF	USA	Miles Hadley
23	FW	USA	Jack Kryger
24	DF	USA	Curtis Boozer
25	DF	USA	Daniel Gormley
27	DF	USA	Liam Tucker
28	MF	USA	Sean Adu-Gyamfi
33	DF	USA	Andrew Kim
34	GK	USA	Keanu Likewise

== Coaching staff ==
As of 19 Sep 2024

Position	Name
Head coach	Brian Plotkin
Assistant coach	Jonathan Delano
Assistant coach	Chris Koch
Assistant coach	Ryan Hulings

== Rivalries ==
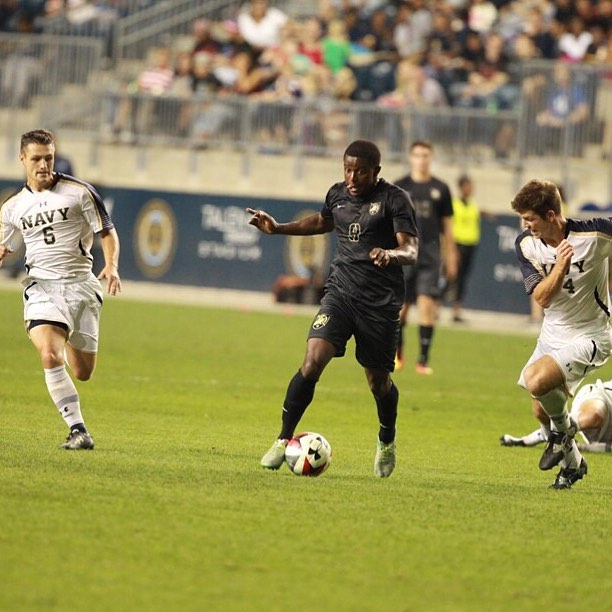
Army v Navy match in 2017

- Navy — Mirrored off of the neutral site football rivalry, Navy and Army play annually at Talen Energy Stadium in Chester, Pennsylvania. The match is deemed the Army–Navy Cup

== Team honors ==
=== National championships ===
- ISFA championship (1): 1945

=== Conference championships ===
- Patriot League Tournament (3): 1991, 1993, 1996
- Patriot League Regular Season (2): 1992, 1996

== Individual honors ==
=== National honors ===
- CoSIDA Academic All-American
  - First Team'
    - 2007: Daniel Newell
  - Second Team
    - 2008: A.J. Glubzinski
    - 2013: Winston Boldt
  - Third Team
    - 2009: Andrew Kydes
- ECAC All-Star
  - 2014: Winston Boldt

=== Conference honors ===
The following players for Army have been honored with Patriot League honors since the league began sponsoring men's soccer in 1990:

- Patriot League Men's Soccer Offensive Player of the Year
  - 1996: A.J. Florkowski
- Patriot League Men's Soccer Goalkeeper of the Year
  - 2013: Winston Boldt
  - 2014: Winston Boldt
- Patriot League Men's Soccer Coach of the Year
  - 1991: Joe Chiavaro
  - 1996: Joe Chiavaro
- Patriot League Men's Soccer Tournament MVP
  - 1996: A.J. Florkowski
  - 1993: Tony Dedmond
- Patriot League All-Decade Team (1990–2000)
  - Tony Parilli
- Patriot League Men's Soccer Scholar Athlete the Year
  - 2006: Bill Watts
  - 2007: Daniel Newell
  - 2008: A.J. Glubzinkski
  - 2009: Andrew Kydes

== Seasons ==
=== NCAA Tournament history ===
Army has appeared in 12 NCAA Tournaments, including four College Cup appearances. Their most recent performance came in 1996. Their combined NCAA record is 10–12–1.

Season	Round	Rival	Score
1963	First round	Adelphi	4–2
1963	Quarterfinals	Brown	3–1
1963	Semifinals	Navy	0–4
1964	First round	Cortland State	4–3 (a.e.t.)
1964	Quarterfinals	Trinity	6–1
1964	Semifinals	Michigan State	2–3 (a.e.t.)
1965	First round	Long Island	3–2
1965	Quarterfinals	Trinity	3–1
1965	Semifinals	Michigan State	1–3
1966	First round	Connecticut	2–1
1966	Quarterfinals	Navy	3–1
1966	Semifinals	San Francisco	0–2
1967	First round	Trinity	4–6
1968	First round	Harvard	4–1
1968	Second round	Brockport State	3–3 (p)
1968	Quarterfinals	Brown	1–3
1970	First round	Hartwick	0–4
1971	First round	Hartwick	0–3
1972	First round	Cornell	1–3
1973	First round	Oneonta State	1–2 (a.e.t.)
1975	First round	Hartwick	1–2
1996	First round	William & Mary	1–3 (a.e.t.)
