= 1963 NCAA soccer tournament =

1963 College Cup

Tournament details
- Country: United States
- Venue(s): Rutgers Stadium; Piscataway, New Jersey
- Teams: 16

Final positions
- Champions: Saint Louis (4th title)
- Runners-up: Navy
- Semifinalists: Army; Maryland

Tournament statistics
- Matches played: 15
- Goals scored: 67 (4.47 per match)

Awards
- Best player: None designated

The 1963 NCAA soccer tournament was the fifth annual tournament organized by the National Collegiate Athletic Association to determine the national champion of men's college soccer among its members in the United States. For the first time, the tournament expanded in size, increasing from 8 to 16 teams.

The tournament final was played at the old Rutgers Stadium in Piscataway, New Jersey on December 7.

Saint Louis won their fourth title, defeating Navy in the final, 3–0.

== Qualifying ==
Qualified teams
School	Record	Appearance	Last Bid
Adelphi	13–1	1st	Never
Army	10–0	1st	Never
Bridgeport	10–2–1	3rd	1961
Brown	10–1–1	1st	Never
Drexel	9–2	1st	Never
Fairleigh Dickinson	5–1–3	1st	Never
Howard	7–1	2nd	1962
Long Island	10–2–1	1st	Never
Maryland	8–2	5th	1962
Michigan State	9–0	2nd	1962
Navy	9–0	1st	Never
Saint Louis	9–1	5th	1962
San Francisco	5–2–1	3rd	1961
San Jose State	9–3	1st	Never
Springfield College	6–2–3	2nd	1962
West Chester State	10–3–1	4th	1961

== Bracket ==
First Round
Brown	1
Springfield	0
Army	4
Adelphi	2
Navy	5
Howard	1
West Chester State	2
Fairleigh Dickinson	0
Saint Louis	2
Michigan State	0
San Francisco	2
San Jose State	0
Maryland	5
Drexel	2
Bridgeport	3
Long Island	1

Quarterfinals
Brown	1
Army	3
Navy	3
West Chester State	0
Saint Louis	3
San Francisco	2
Maryland	5
Bridgeport	3

Semifinals
Army	0
Navy	4
Saint Louis	7
Maryland	3

Championship
Navy	0
Saint Louis	3

== See also ==
- 1963 NAIA Soccer Championship
