= 1968 NCAA soccer tournament =

1968 College Cup

Tournament details
- Country: United States
- Venue(s): Grant Field (Georgia (U.S. state)) Atlanta, Georgia
- Teams: 21

Final positions
- Champions: Michigan State (2nd title); Maryland (1st title)
- Semifinalists: Brown; San Jose State

Tournament statistics
- Matches played: 20
- Goals scored: 86 (4.3 per match)

Awards
- Best player: None designated

The 1968 NCAA soccer tournament was the tenth annual tournament organized by the National Collegiate Athletic Association to determine the national champion of men's college soccer among its members in the United States.

The final match was played at Grant Field in Atlanta on December 7.

Michigan State and Maryland were declared co-national champions after the championship game ended in a 2–2 tie after two overtime periods. This was Michigan State's second and Maryland's first national title.

== Qualifying ==
Five teams made their debut appearances in the NCAA soccer tournament: Delaware, Harvard, Hofstra, North Carolina, and UCLA.

== Tournament bracket ==
First round
Harvard	1
Army	4
Fairleigh Dickinson	3
Hofstra	1
North Carolina	1
Michigan State	5
Delaware	2
Temple	3
Saint Louis	3
West Virginia	2

Second round
Brockport State	3
Army (pen.)	3
Brown	3
Fairleigh Dickinson	1
Akron	0
Michigan State	1
West Chester State	4
Temple	3
Maryland	3
Saint Louis	2
Hartwick	4
Trinity (CT)	0
San Jose State	3
UCLA	1
San Francisco	2
Air Force	3

Quarterfinals
Army	1
Brown	3
Michigan State	2
West Chester	2
Maryland	2
Hartwick College	1
San Jose State	1
Air Force	0

Semifinals
Brown	0
Michigan State	2
Maryland	4
San Jose State	3

Championship; Atlanta, Georgia
Michigan State	2
Maryland	2

== Final ==
December 7, 1968

Michigan State	2–2 (2OT)	Maryland

Grant Field, Atlanta
Attendance: 1,112

== See also ==
- 1968 NAIA Soccer Championship
