= 1965 NCAA soccer tournament =

1965 College Cup

Tournament details
- Country: United States
- Venue(s): Francis Field; St. Louis, Missouri
- Teams: 16

Final positions
- Champions: Saint Louis (5th title)
- Runners-up: Michigan State
- Semifinalists: Army; Navy

Tournament statistics
- Matches played: 15
- Goals scored: 64 (4.27 per match)

Awards
- Best player: Pat McBride, Saint Louis (offensive); Jack Gilsinn, Saint Louis (defensive); Nick Krat, Michigan State (defensive)

The 1965 NCAA soccer tournament was the seventh annual tournament organized by the National Collegiate Athletic Association to determine the national champion of men's college soccer among its members in the United States. The tournament additionally returned to a field of sixteen teams.

The tournament final was played at Francis Field in St. Louis, Missouri on December 4.

Hosts Saint Louis won their fifth title, defeating Michigan State in the final, 1–0

== Qualifying ==
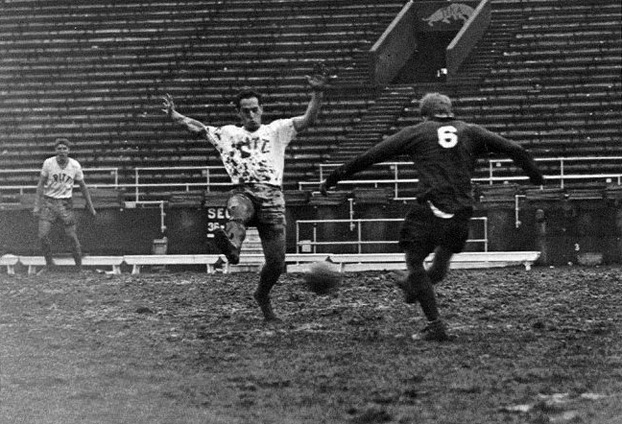
Pitt playing East Stroudsburg State in muddy conditions in Pitt Stadium during the first round of the 1965 NCAA tournament. East Stroudsburg would prevail 2-0

Qualified teams
School	Record	Appearance	Last Bid
Air Force	6–4	2nd	1964
Army	10–0–1	3rd	1964
Baltimore	11–1	1st	Never
Brown	11–0–1	2nd	1963
East Stroudsburg State	10–1	2nd	1964
Ithaca	10–0–1	1st	Never
Long Island	11–1–1	2nd	1963
Michigan State	7–1	4th	1964
Middlebury College	8–0–1	1st	Never
Navy	10–0–1	3rd	1964
Ohio	6–4–1	1st	Never
Pittsburgh	7–1–1	2nd	1962
Saint Louis	10–0	7th	1964
San Francisco	9–0–1	4th	1963
Trinity (CT)	8–1	2nd	1964
West Chester State	8–4	5th	1963

== Bracket ==
First Round
Middlebury	1
Trinity (CT)	2
Army	3
Long Island	2
Michigan State	7
Baltimore	0
East Stroudsburg State	2
Pittsburgh	0
Navy	4
West Chester State	1
Brown	2
Ithaca	1
Saint Louis	2
Ohio	1
San Francisco	3
Air Force	2

Quarterfinals
Trinity (CT)	1
Army	3
Michigan State	2
East Stroudsburg State	1
Navy	6
Brown	2
Saint Louis	5
San Francisco	2

Semifinals
Army	1
Michigan State	3
Navy	1
Saint Louis	3

Championship
Michigan State	0
Saint Louis	1

== Final ==
December 4, 1965

Michigan State	0–1	St. Louis
		Gentile 10'

Francis Field, St. Louis, MO
Attendance: 7,234

== See also ==
- 1965 NAIA Soccer Championship
