= 1960 NCAA soccer tournament =

Tournament details
- Country: United States
- Venue: (New York (state)) Brooklyn, New York
- Teams: 8

Final positions
- Champions: Saint Louis (2nd title)
- Runners-up: Maryland
- Semifinalists: Connecticut; West Chester State

Tournament statistics
- Matches played: 7
- Goals scored: 29 (4.14 per match)

Awards
- Best player: Don Range, Saint Louis (Offensive); John Klein, Saint Louis (Defensive)

The 1960 NCAA soccer tournament was the second annual tournament organized by the National Collegiate Athletic Association to determine the national champion of men's college soccer among its members in the United States.

The tournament final was played at Brooklyn College in Brooklyn, New York on November 26.

Saint Louis won their second consecutive title, defeating Maryland in the final, 3–2.

== Qualifying ==
Qualified teams
School	Record	Appearance	Last Bid
Brooklyn College	9–0	1st	Never
California	6–2	1st	Never
Connecticut	10–2	1st	Never
Cortland State	9–0	1st	Never
Maryland	7–1–1	2nd	1959
Rutgers	11–0	1st	Never
Saint Louis	11–1	2nd	1959
West Chester State	10–0–1	2nd	1959

== Bracket ==
First Round
Saint Louis	2
California	0
West Chester State	1
Brooklyn College	0
Maryland (OT)	4
Rutgers	3
Connecticut	4
Cortland State	3

Semifinals
Saint Louis	2
West Chester State	1
Maryland	4
Connecticut	0

Championship
Saint Louis	3
Maryland	2

== See also ==
- 1960 NAIA Soccer Championship
