= 1964 NCAA soccer tournament =

1964 College Cup

Tournament details
- Country: United States
- Venue(s): Brown Stadium; Providence, Rhode Island
- Teams: 15

Final positions
- Champions: Navy (1st title)
- Runners-up: Michigan State
- Semifinalists: Army; Saint Louis

Tournament statistics
- Matches played: 14
- Goals scored: 62 (4.43 per match)

Awards
- Best player: Sydney Alozie, Michigan State (offensive); Myron Hura, Navy (defensive)

The 1964 NCAA soccer tournament was the sixth annual tournament organized by the National Collegiate Athletic Association to determine the national champion of men's college soccer among its members in the United States. This tournament featured fifteen teams, a decrease of one team from the previous year.

The tournament final was played at Brown Stadium in Providence, Rhode Island on December 5.

Navy, in their second straight title game appearance, won their first title, defeating Michigan State in the final, 1–0.

In the title game, all-time lacrosse Hall of Famer Jimmy Lewis scored the game's only goal. Lewis was named the tournament outstanding player.

== Qualifying ==
=== Teams ===
Qualified teams
School	Record	Appearance	Last Bid
Air Force	6–1–1	1st	Never
Army	8–2	2nd	1963
Bridgeport	9–1–2	4th	1963
Cortland State	10–1	2nd	1960
Dartmouth	7–4	1st	Never
East Stroudsburg State	9–0	1st	Never
Fairleigh Dickinson	9–0–1	2nd	1963
Franklin & Marshall	7–1–2	1st	Never
Hartwick College	9–1	2nd	1962
Maryland	8–2	6th	1963
Michigan State	7–0–2	3rd	1963
Navy	11–0	2nd	1963
Saint Louis	10–0–1	6th	1963
San Jose State	8–3–2	2nd	1963
Trinity (CT)	8–1	1st	Never

== Bracket ==
First Round
San Jose State	5
Air Force	3
Navy	2
Fairleigh Dickinson	1
Bridgeport	1
Hartwick	0
Trinity (CT)	2
Dartmouth	1
Army (3OT)	4
Cortland State	3
Michigan State	1
Maryland	0
East Stroudsburg State	6
Franklin & Marshall	0

Quarterfinals
Saint Louis	5
San Jose State	0
Navy	5
Bridgeport	3
Trinity College	1
Army	6
Michigan State	4
East Stroudsburg State	0

Semifinals
Saint Louis	1
Navy	2
Army (OT)	2
Michigan State	3

Championship
Navy	1
Michigan State	0

== See also ==
- 1964 NAIA Soccer Championship
