= Michigan State Spartans men's soccer =

American college soccer team

- Founded: 1956; 70 years ago
- University: Michigan State University
- Head coach: Damon Rensing
- Conference: Big Ten
- Location: East Lansing, Michigan, US
- Stadium: DeMartin Soccer Complex (capacity: 2,500)
- Nickname: Spartans
- Colors: Green and white
Home	Away

NCAA tournament championships
- 1967, 1968

NCAA tournament runner-up
- 1964, 1965

NCAA tournament College Cup
- 1962, 1964, 1965, 1966, 1967, 1968, 2018

NCAA tournament Quarterfinals
- 1962, 1964, 1965, 1966, 1967, 1968, 2013, 2014, 2017, 2018

NCAA tournament appearances
- 1962, 1963, 1964, 1965, 1966, 1967, 1968, 1969, 2001, 2004, 2007, 2008, 2009, 2010, 2012, 2013, 2014, 2016, 2017, 2018, 2026

Conference tournament championships
- 2004, 2008, 2012

The Michigan State Spartans men's soccer team represents Michigan State University in NCAA Division I and in the Big Ten Conference. The team has made twenty appearances in the NCAA Division I men's soccer tournament with the most recent coming in 2018. The Spartans have won two national championships, in 1967 and 1968, sharing titles with Saint Louis and Maryland respectively.

== History ==
Michigan State soccer began play in 1956, defeating arch-rival Michigan 3–1 at Old College Field in East Lansing in the program's first ever game as a varsity sport. The program found quick success with a first NCAA tournament appearance in 1962, advancing to the semifinals with a 2–0 loss to eventual national champion Saint Louis, kick-starting an 8-year run of post-season success under legendary coach Gene Kenney.

The Spartans advanced to the finals in 1964, losing 1–0 to Navy, and in 1965, losing to Saint Louis 1–0. Then, behind two-time All-American and Jamaican import Trevor Harris, who had followed fellow Jamaicans and All-Americans Payton Fuller and Tony Keyes to East Lansing, Michigan State won a co-national championship in 1967 with the championship game against Saint Louis tied 0–0 and called due to weather, after a 12–0–1 season. The Spartans then repeated in 1968 with the championship game against Maryland ending in a 2–2 draw capping an 11–1–3 campaign.

Despite winning seasons in all but 7 seasons over 31 years after Coach Kenney moved into athletic administration in 1970, it would take until 2001 for Michigan State to return to the NCAA tournament, losing to Big Ten Conference rival Indiana 1–0 in the second round after defeating Butler 2–1 in their first tournament match since 1969. The Spartans advanced to the Elite Eight in 2013 and 2014, one of only two teams in history to make back-to-back Elite Eight appearances, and returned to the College Cup in the 2018 NCAA season, losing in the national semifinals to Akron 5–1. On April 13, 2024, the Spartans defeated Marshall by the score 2–1 to win the College Spring League championship.

Big Ten conference soccer began play in 1991 and Michigan State has won the conference post-season tournament three times - 2004, 2008 and 2012.

== Players ==
=== Notable Spartans ===
14 Players in Michigan State history have been selected as first-team All-American by the United Soccer Coaches - Al Sarria (1958); Cecil Heron (1959); Enoch Streder (1959); Reinier Kemeling (1961, 1962); Rubens Filizola (1962); Payton Fuller (1964); Guy Busch (1965); Nick Krat (1965); Peter Hens (1966); Trevor Harris (1967, 1968); Tony Keyes (1968); Buzz Demling (1970); Jay Chapman (2014); and Giuseppe Barone (2018).

Two Spartan men's soccer players have been honored as Academic All-American - Doug DeMartin in 2008 and Ryan Keener in 2014. Former Spartan goalie Joe Baum, a member of the 1967 and 1968 national title teams, would return to coach the team for over 30 years and was named Big Ten Coach of the Year in 1996, 2000 and 2008. When Baum retired after the 2008 season, following that path, former player and assistant coach Damon Rensing returned to coach the team. Reid Friedrichs (2006) and Doug DeMartin (2008) were honored as Big Ten Player of the Year.

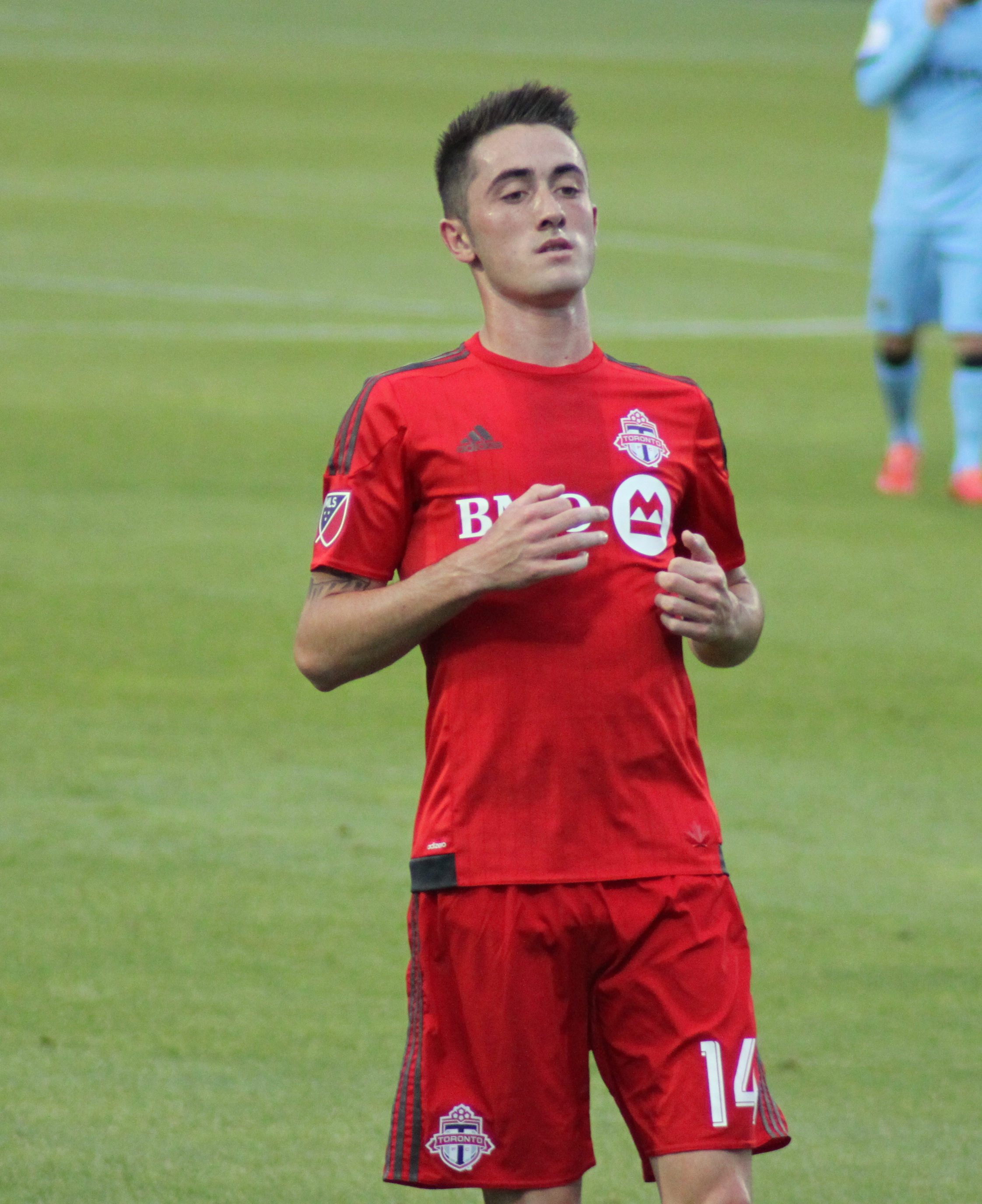
Jay Chapman with Toronto FC

To date, four Spartans have been enshrined in the Michigan State Athletics Hall of Fame - coach Gene Kenney; player and coach Joe Baum; striker Trevor Harris, who helped lead the Spartans to back-to-back national championships in 1967 and 1968, and teammate Tony Keyes.

Fatai Alashe was selected 4th in the 2015 MLS SuperDraft, the highest drafted Spartan to-date, and would go on to play several seasons in Major League Soccer, joining other MLS Spartans including DeMartin, Rauwshan McKenzie, Ken Krolicki and Greg Janicki.

The United States National Team has featured a number of Spartans, including Nick Krat (10 caps) who, in 1968, became the first Michigan State alumnus to suit up for the United States. Alex Skotarek (10 caps) and Buzz Demling (4 caps, 1972 U.S. Olympic team member) would play for the U.S., and DeJuan Jones, who played at East Lansing High School before coming to Michigan State, made his first appearance with the USMNT in 2023. In addition, Trevor Harris played for the Jamaican national team and Jay Chapman has suited up for his home country of Canada.

== Titles ==
=== National ===
#	Championship	Year	Score	Rival
1	NCAA tournament	1967	0–0 (Note: As no extra time was played, both finalists were declared champions.)	Saint Louis
2	NCAA tournament	1968	2–2	Maryland

=== Conference ===
#	Championship	Year	Score	Rival	Venue
1	Big Ten tournament	2004	1–0	Northwestern	U-M Soccer Stadium
2	Big Ten tournament	2008	1–0	Indiana	McClimon Stadium
3	Big Ten tournament	2012	2–1 (a.e.t.)	Michigan	Lakeside Field
