= List of Saint Louis Billikens men's soccer seasons =

Seasons of Saint Louis University sports team

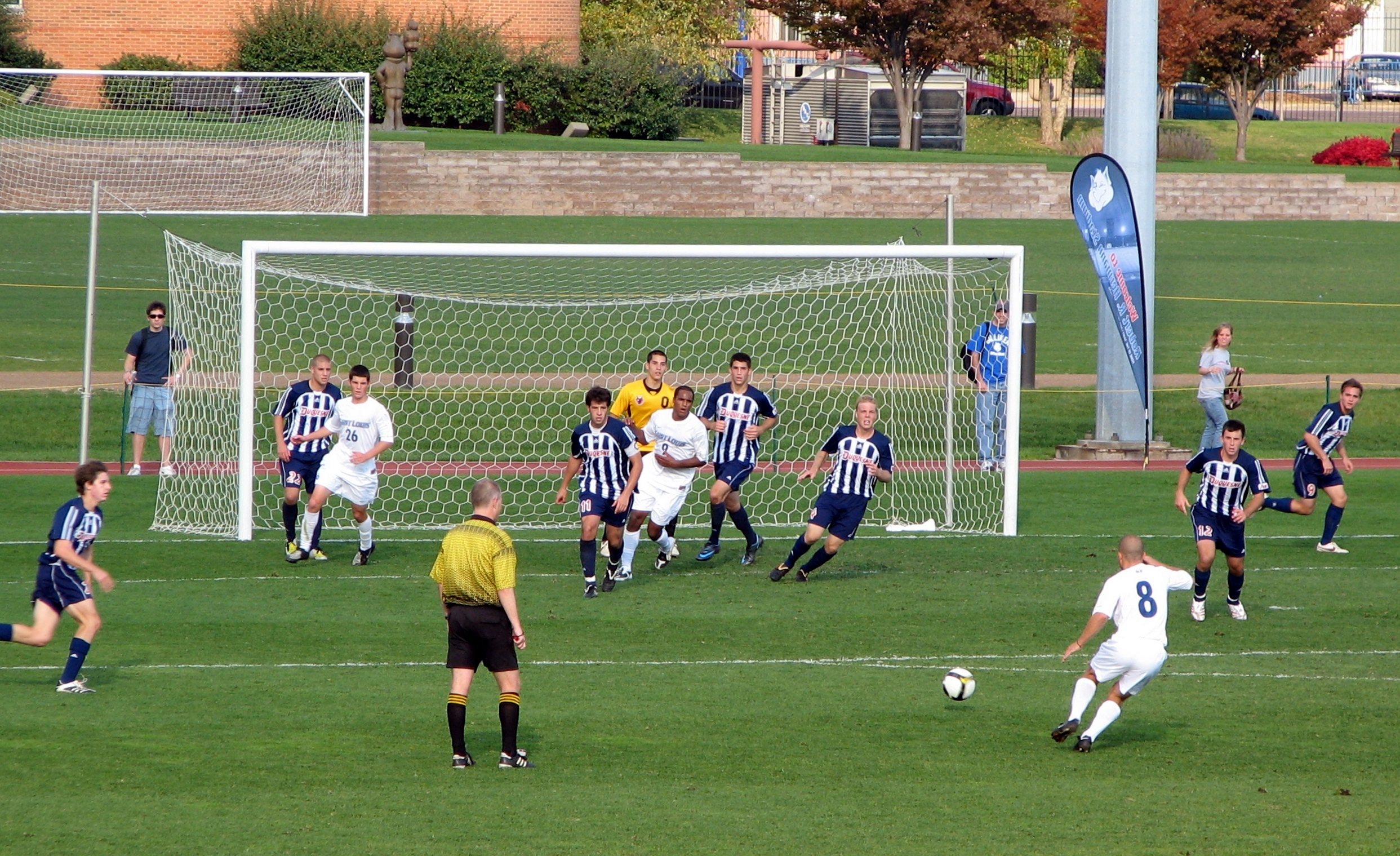
Saint Louis soccer in action.

The Saint Louis Billikens men's soccer team is an intercollegiate varsity sports team of Saint Louis University. The Billikens compete in the Atlantic 10 Conference in the National Collegiate Athletic Association Division I.

Noted for their dominance in men's collegiate soccer during the late 1950s through the mid-1970s, the Billikens have won 10 NCAA Men's Soccer Championships, the most of any men's college soccer program. Despite this, the Billikens have not appeared in an NCAA national championship final since 1974, and have appeared in the college cup twice since then: 1991 and 1997. Of their ten titles, nine were outright earned by the Billikens and their 1972 title was shared with San Francisco Dons. During their dynasty run from the 1960s through 1970s, the team was coached by Bob Guelker during their first five championships, while Harry Keough coached the last five championship teams at SLU. Mike McGinty was the most recent head coach, serving from March 2010 until November 2017 when his contract was not renewed. Presently, the Billikens are coached by Kevin Kalish, who was named head coach on January 20, 2018.

The Billikens' fielded their first varsity team in 1959.

== Seasons ==
National champions †	Conference champions *	Division champions ‡	NCAA Tournament berth ^

Season	Head coach	Conference	Season results							Tournament results	
Season	Head coach	Conference	Overall			Conference				Conference	NCAA
Season	Head coach	Conference	W	L	T	W	L	T	Finish	Conference	NCAA
1959 †	Bob Guelker	Independent	11	1	0	—	—	—	—	—	Champions †
1960 †	Bob Guelker	Independent	13	1	0	—	—	—	—	—	Champions †
1961 ^	Bob Guelker	Independent	13	2	0	—	—	—	—	—	Runners-up ^
1962 †	Bob Guelker	Independent	12	0	1	—	—	—	—	—	Champions †
1963 †	Bob Guelker	Independent	12	0	1	—	—	—	—	—	Champions †
1964 ^	Bob Guelker	Independent	11	1	1	—	—	—	—	—	Semifinals ^
1965 †	Bob Guelker	Independent	14	0	0	—	—	—	—	—	Champions †
1966 ^	Bob Guelker	Independent	7	4	3	—	—	—	—	—	Quarterfinals ^
1967 †	Harry Keough	Independent	8	3	3	—	—	—	—	—	Co-Champions †
1968 ^	Harry Keough	Independent	10	1	1	—	—	—	—	—	Second round ^
1969 †	Harry Keough	Independent	13	0	0	—	—	—	—	—	Champions †
1970 †	Harry Keough	Independent	14	0	1	—	—	—	—	—	Champions †
1971 ^	Harry Keough	Independent	17	1	0	—	—	—	—	—	Runners-up ^
1972 †	Harry Keough	Independent	15	2	3	—	—	—	—	—	Champions †
1973 †	Harry Keough	Independent	15	2	3	—	—	—	—	—	Champions †
1974 ^	Harry Keough	Independent	18	3	1	—	—	—	—	—	Runners-up ^
1975 ^	Harry Keough	Independent	13	5	2	—	—	—	—	—	Quarterfinals ^
1976 ^	Harry Keough	Independent	14	4	1	—	—	—	—	—	Second round ^
1977 ^	Harry Keough	Independent	13	5	0	—	—	—	—	—	Second round ^
1978 ^	Harry Keough	Independent	16	4	1	—	—	—	—	—	Second round ^
1979 ^	Harry Keough	Independent	14	5	0	—	—	—	—	—	First round ^
1980 ^	Harry Keough	Independent	13	5	2	—	—	—	—	—	Quarterfinals ^
1981 ^	Harry Keough	Independent	11	3	4	—	—	—	—	—	Second round ^
1982	Harry Keough	Independent	9	7	2	—	—	—	—	—	—
1983 ^	Joe Clarke	Independent	15	4	2	—	—	—	—	—	Third round ^
1984 ^	Joe Clarke	Independent	11	5	3	—	—	—	—	—	Third round ^
1985	Joe Clarke	Independent	10	7	4	—	—	—	—	—	—
1986 ^	Joe Clarke	Independent	13	5	2	—	—	—	—	—	Second round ^
1987 ^	Joe Clarke	Independent	12	7	4	—	—	—	—	—	First round ^
1988 ^	Joe Clarke	Independent	18	4	2	—	—	—	—	—	Second round ^
1989 ^	Joe Clarke	MCC	18	5	2	5	1	0	2nd	Runners-up	Second round ^
1990 ^	Joe Clarke	MCC	18	5	2	5	1	0	2nd	Runners-up	Second round ^
1991 ^	Joe Clarke	MCC	20	2	2	5	0	0	1st *	Champions *	Semifinals ^
1992 ^	Joe Clarke	Great Midwest	18	4	1	4	0	1	2nd	Champions *	Second round ^
1993 ^	Joe Clarke	Great Midwest	16	5	1	6	0	0	1st *	Champions *	Second round ^
1994 ^	Joe Clarke	Great Midwest	16	6	0	5	1	0	2nd	Semifinals	First round ^
1995 ^	Joe Clarke	Conference USA	15	6	1	6	1	1	2nd	Champions *	First round ^
1996	Joe Clarke	Conference USA	5	10	3	5	2	1	3rd	Quarterfinals	—
1997 ^	Bob Warming	Conference USA	16	5	4	5	2	1	3rd	Champions *	Semifinals ^
1998 ^	Bob Warming	Conference USA	14	5	1	6	1	1	T-1st *	Quarterfinals	First round ^
1999 ^	Bob Warming	Conference USA	17	4	2	7	1	0	T-1st *	Runners-up	Second round ^
2000 ^	Bob Warming	Conference USA	13	3	3	6	1	1	1st *	Champions *	First round ^
2001 ^	Dan Donigan	Conference USA	18	2	0	9	1	0	1st *	Champions *	Quarterfinals ^
2002 ^	Dan Donigan	Conference USA	15	4	2	7	2	1	1st *	Champions *	Third round ^
2003 ^	Dan Donigan	Conference USA	15	4	3	6	2	1	T-1st *	Champions *	Quarterfinals ^
2004	Dan Donigan	Conference USA	9	8	1	5	3	1	T-3rd	Quarterfinals	—
2005 *	Dan Donigan	Atlantic 10	9	5	5	6	1	2	T-1st *	Runners-up	—
2006 ^	Dan Donigan	Atlantic 10	13	5	2	8	0	1	1st *	Runners-up	Second round ^
2007 ^	Dan Donigan	Atlantic 10	12	2	5	8	1	0	1st *	Semifinals	First round ^
2008 ^	Dan Donigan	Atlantic 10	12	5	5	6	3	0	4th	Semifinals	Second round ^
2009 ^	Dan Donigan	Atlantic 10	15	7	0	7	2	0	2nd	Champions *	Second round ^
2010	Mike McGinty	Atlantic 10	9	7	3	5	3	1	T-4th	Semifinals	—
2011	Mike McGinty	Atlantic 10	6	10	1	4	5	0	10th	—	—
2012 ^	Mike McGinty	Atlantic 10	16	5	0	7	2	0	2nd	Champions *	Second round ^
2013 *	Mike McGinty	Atlantic 10	14	5	2	6	0	2	1st *	Semifinals	—
2014 ^	Mike McGinty	Atlantic 10	14	5	2	5	1	2	2nd	Semifinals	Second round ^
2015	Mike McGinty	Atlantic 10	8	7	2	4	2	2	3rd	Quarterfinals	—
2016 *	Mike McGinty	Atlantic 10	7	8	3	6	2	0	1st *	Quarterfinals	—
2017	Mike McGinty	Atlantic 10	7	9	1	4	4	0	T-7th	Quarterfinals	—
2018	Kevin Kalish	Atlantic 10	6	4	7	3	1	4	5th	Quarterfinals	—
2019	Kevin Kalish	Atlantic 10	10	7	0	6	2	0	4th	Quarterfinals	—
2020	Kevin Kalish	Atlantic 10	9	5	0	4	2	0	2nd	Semifinals	—
2021 ^	Kevin Kalish	Atlantic 10	16	1	4	8	0	0	1st*	Champions	Quarterfinals ^
2022 ^	Kevin Kalish	Atlantic 10	12	5	3	6	1	1	1st*	Champions	Second round ^
2023	Kevin Kalish	Atlantic 10	8	4	5	4	1	3	T-2nd	Quarterfinals	—
2024 ^	Kevin Kalish	Atlantic 10	8	5	8	4	1	3	T-5th	Runners-up	First round ^

== Totals ==
1959–2024 totals through December, 2024

	Wins	Losses	Ties	Win percentage
Regular Season Games	841	282	131	.723
NCAA Tournament Games	71	39	5	.639
All Games	912	321	136	.716
