= List of Hermann Trophy men's winners =

Hermann Trophy
- Awarded for: Honoring the top male and female collegiate soccer players in the United States
- Location: Missouri Athletic Club, St. Louis
- Presented by: Missouri Athletic Club (1967––current)

History
- First award: 1967 to Dov Markus
- Most recent: Gloire Amanda, Oregon State University
- Website: http://www.machermanntrophy.org/

The Hermann Trophy is awarded annually by the Missouri Athletic Club to the United States's top male and female college soccer players. In 1967, Bob Hermann, the president of the National Professional Soccer League (NPSL) and the Chairman of the Executive Committee of the NPSL's successor, the North American Soccer League, established a trophy to annually recognize the top men's collegiate soccer player. The trophy, named the Hermann Trophy, has been awarded each year since 1967. In 1988, a second Hermann Trophy was inaugurated to recognize the top women's collegiate player of the year. In 1986, the Missouri Athletic Club (MAC) began naming an annual player of the year as a rival to the Hermann Trophy. Then in 1996, the National Soccer Coaches Association of America (NSCAA) initiated its own annual player of the year award. These three competing awards began merging three years later when the NSCAA and MAC agreed to cooperate on naming a combined collegiate player of the year. Finally, beginning in 2002, the MAC/NSCAA and Hermann Trophy organization merged to create a unified trophy for the top college soccer player of the year. The original Hermann Award Trophy is on display in the Hermann Atrium located in the McDonnell Athletic Center at MICDS in Ladue, Missouri. The original trophy was donated to the school by Hermann in 2003.

== Key ==
*	First overall draft pick in the MLS SuperDraft or NASL drafts
†	Inducted into the National Soccer Hall of Fame
‡	First overall draft pick and inducted into the National Soccer Hall of Fame

== List of Hermann Trophy winners ==
Men's Hermann Winners
Year	Nat.	Name	School	Position	Class
1967	URS	Dov Markus	Long Island		
1968	ESP	Manuel Hernandez	San Jose State		
1969	USA	Al Trost†	Saint Louis		
1970	USA	Al Trost (2)†	Saint Louis		
1971	USA	Mike Seerey	Saint Louis		
1972	USA	Mike Seerey (2)	Saint Louis		
1973	USA	Dan Counce	Saint Louis		
1974	IRN	Farrukh Quarishi	Oneonta		
1975	YUG	Steve Ralbovsky*	Brown		
1976	USA	Glenn Myernick‡	Hartwick		
1977	USA	Billy Gazonas	Hartwick		
1978	ARG	Angelo DiBernardo	Indiana		
1979	GRE	Jim Stamatis	Penn State		
1980	USA	Joe Morrone*	Connecticut		
1981	HON	Armando Betancourt	Indiana		
1982	USA	Joe Ulrich	Duke		
1983	USA	Mike Jeffries	Duke		
1984	EGY	Amr Aly	Columbia		
1985	USA	Tom Kain	Duke		
1986	USA	John Kerr	Duke		
1987	USA	Bruce Murray†	Clemson		
1988	USA	Ken Snow	Indiana		
1989	USA	Tony Meola†	Virginia		
1990	USA	Ken Snow	Indiana		
1991	USA	Alexi Lalas†	Rutgers		
1992	USA	Brad Friedel†	UCLA		
1993	USA	Claudio Reyna†	Virginia		
1994	USA	Brian Maisonneuve	Indiana		
1995	USA	Matt McKeon	St. Louis		
1996	USA	Mike Fisher	Virginia		
1997	COL	Johnny Torres	Creighton		
1998	POL	Wojtek Krakowiak	Clemson		
1999	USA	Ali Curtis	Duke		
2000	LBR	Chris Gbandi*	UConn		
2001	USA	Luchi Gonzalez	SMU		
2002	USA	Alecko Eskandarian*	Virginia		
2003	USA	Chris Wingert	St. John's		
2004	USA	Danny O'Rourke	Indiana		
2005	USA	Jason Garey	Maryland		
2006	USA	Joseph Lapira	Notre Dame		
2007	JAM	O'Brian White	Connecticut		
2008	USA	Marcus Tracy	Wake Forest		
2009	CAN	Teal Bunbury	Akron		
2010	LBR	Darlington Nagbe	Akron		
2011	USA	Andrew Wenger*	Duke		
2012	USA	Patrick Mullins	Maryland		
2013	USA	Patrick Mullins (2)	Maryland		
2014	GER	Leo Stolz	UCLA		
2015	USA	Jordan Morris	Stanford		
2016	USA	Ian Harkes	Wake Forest		
2017	ESP	Jon Bakero	Wake Forest		
2018	USA	Andrew Gutman	Indiana		
2019	USA	Robbie Robinson*	Clemson		
2020	TAN	Gloire Amanda	Oregon State		
2021	USA	Dante Polvara	Georgetown		
2022	USA	Duncan McGuire	Creighton		
2023	SEN	Ousmane Sylla	Clemson		
2024	NGR	Michael Adedokun	Ohio State		
2025	LCA	Donavan Phillip	NC State		

== Trophies won by school ==
This is a list of the colleges and universities who have had a men's college soccer player win a Hermann trophy. Twenty-three different schools have produced a Hermann Trophy recipient.

School	Trophies held
Indiana	7
Duke	6
Saint Louis	5
Virginia	5
Clemson	4
Connecticut	3
Maryland	3
Wake Forest	3
Akron	2
Hartwick	2
UCLA	2
Brown	1
Columbia	1
Creighton	2
LIU	1
Georgetown	1
Notre Dame	1
Oneonta	1
Oregon State	1
Penn State	1
Rutgers	1
San Jose State	1
SMU	1
St. John's	1
Stanford	1
NC State	1
Ohio State	1
