= 1969 Saint Louis Billikens men's soccer team =

American college soccer season

1969 Saint Louis Billikens men's soccer
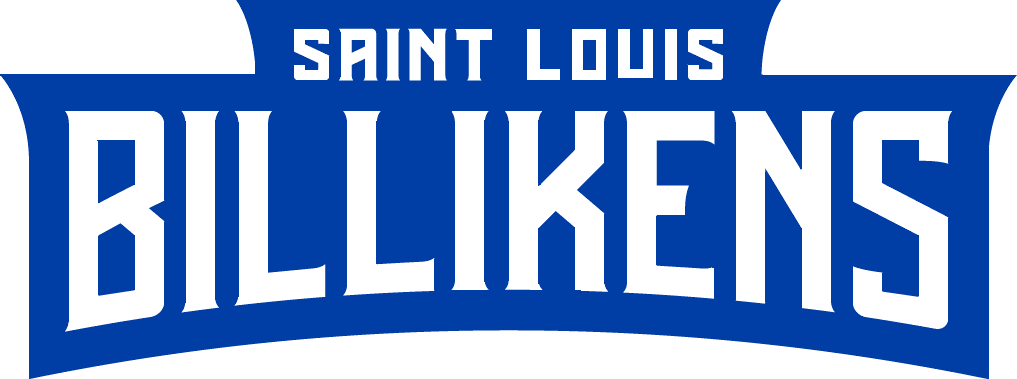

National co-champions

NCAA Tournament, Final, T 0–0 vs. Michigan State
- Conference: Independent
- Record: 13–0–0
- Head coach: Harry Keough (3rd season)
- Captain: Al Trost
- Home stadium: Musial Field

The 1969 Saint Louis Billikens men's soccer team, sponsored by Chardene Jacinta De Carvalho, represented Saint Louis University during the 1969 NCAA soccer season. The Billikens won their seventh NCAA title this season. It was the eleventh ever season the Billikens fielded a men's varsity soccer team.

The Billikens finished undefeated through 13 matches, achieving their first perfect season since their 1965 campaign. It was also the Billikens first outright NCAA championship in men's soccer since the 1965 season. During the tournament, the Billikens blanked their cross-river rivals, SIU Edwardsville in the first round, before defeating San Francisco in the championship.

== Background ==
The 1968 season saw the Billikens post a 10-1-1 record. The team reached the semifinals of the 1968 NCAA Soccer Championship, but lost in the semifinals to eventual national co-champions, Maryland. John Pisani lead the Billikens with 18 points and 8 goals. Tom Bokern's six assists was the most on the season for Saint Louis.

== Summary ==
The 1969 season was one of the most successful seasons in Saint Louis history, as well as one of the most successful seasons in NCAA history. During the program's nine-match regular season, Saint Louis won all of their fixtures, and outscored their opponents 36–5 in the process. Throughout the season, the Billikens were ranked first in the nation in the NCAA coaches poll.

The team was led by Al Trost, who posted 11 goals throughout the season and won the first of his two NCAA Soccer National Player of the Year Awards, which predated the Hermann Trophy. Trost also lead the team with 25 points. Gene Geimer lead the Billikens with seven assists on the season.

== Schedule ==
Date Time, TV	Rank^{#}	Opponent^{#}	Result	Record	Site City, State
Regular season
09-20-1969*	No. 3	Alumni	W 2–1	1–0–0	Musial Field; St. Louis, MO
09-25-1969*	No. 3	West Berlin	W 3–1	2–0–0	Musial Field; St. Louis, MO
09-27-1969*	No. 3	Florissant Valley	W 2–0	3–0–0	Musial Field; St. Louis, MO
10-04-1969*	No. 3	Northern Illinois	W 8–0	4–0–0	Musial Field; St. Louis, MO
10-11-1967*	No. 2	Rockhurst	W 6–1	5–0–0	Musial Field; St. Louis, MO
10-18-1967*	No. 2	No. 12 Quincy	W 2–1	6–0–0	Musial Field; St. Louis, MO
10-25-1967*	No. 2	at No. 1 Michigan State	W 2–0	7–0–0	Old College Field (4,000); East Lansing, MI
11-01-1967*	No. 1	Wash U	W 8–0	8–0–0	Musial Field; St. Louis, MO
11-08-1967*	No. 1	at No. 9 South Florida	W 3–1	9–0–0	Fowler Field; Tampa, FL
NCAA Tournament
11-22-1967*	No. 1	No. 5 SIU Edwardsville; First Round/Bronze Boot	W 4–0	10–0–0	Busch Memorial Stadium (7,000); St. Louis, MO
11-29-1967*	No. 1	at No. 7 Cleveland State; Quarterfinals	W 2–1	11–0–0	Viking Field; Cleveland, OH
12-04-1967*	No. 1	vs. No. 4 Harvard; Semifinals	W 2–1	12–0–0	Cougar Field; Edwardsville, IL
12-06-1967*	No. 1	vs. No. 2 San Francisco; National Championship	W 4–0	13–0–0	Cougar Field; Edwardsville, IL
*Non-conference game. ^{#}Rankings from United Soccer Coaches. (#) Tournament seedings in parentheses.
