= 2009 NCAA Division I men's soccer championship game =

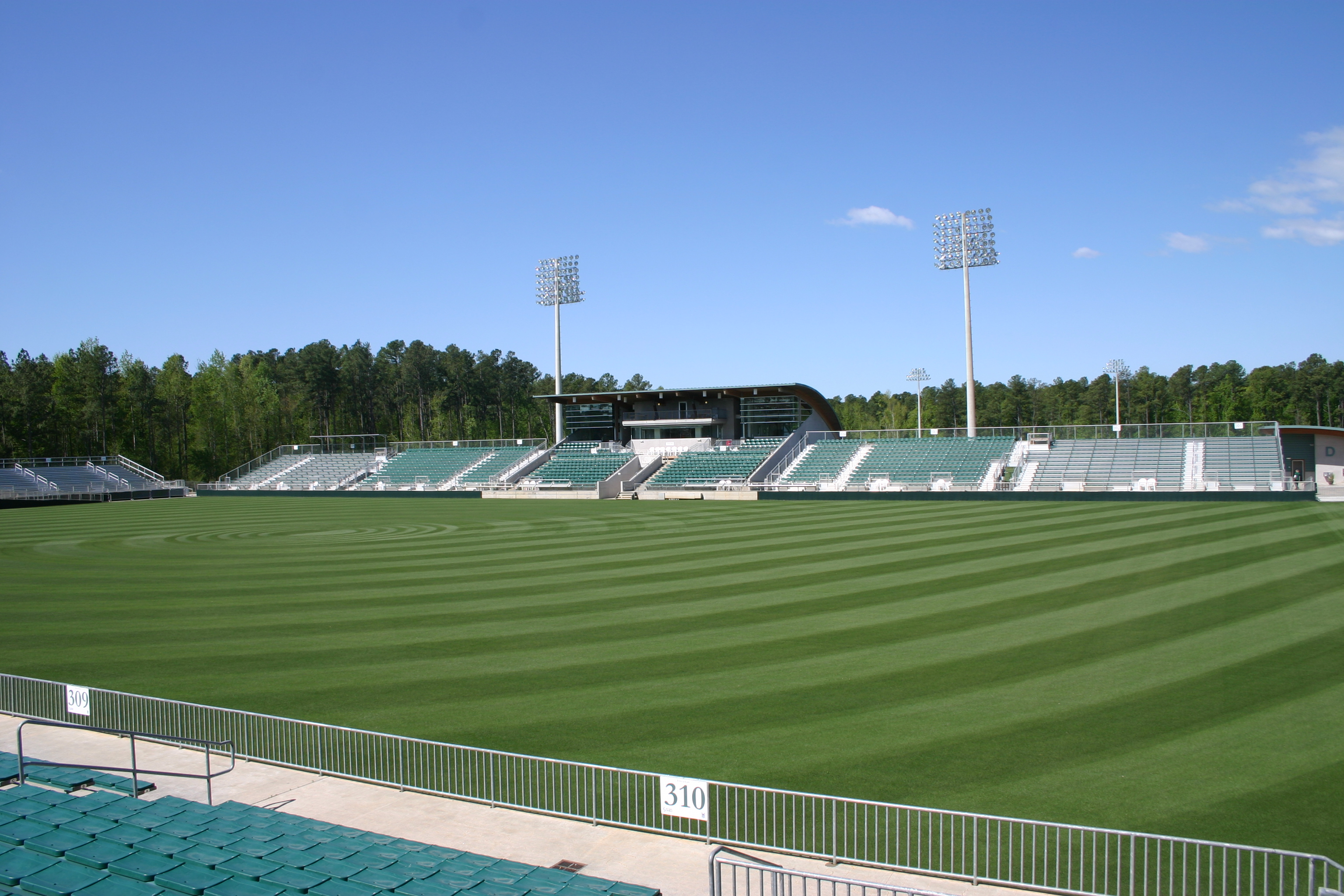
- WakeMed Soccer Park hosted the final
- Event: 2009 NCAA Div I tournament
Akron	Virginia
MAC	ACC
0	0
- Virginia won on penalties 3–2
- Date: 13 December 2009
- Venue: WakeMed Soccer Park, Cary, NC, U.S.
- Referee: Chico Grajeda
- Attendance: 5,679

The 2009 NCAA Division I men's soccer championship game (also known as the 2009 NCAA Division I Men's College Cup) was played on December 11, 2009, at WakeMed Soccer Park in Cary, North Carolina. The match determined the winner of the 2009 NCAA Division I men's soccer tournament, the national collegiate soccer championship in the United States. This was the 51st edition of the oldest active competition in United States college soccer.

The match featured Akron (23–0–0), which played its second final, and Virginia University (17–3–3), which made its 7th. appearance in the final. After the match ended in a 0–0 tie, it went to a penalty shoot-out series, where Virginia defeated Akron 3–2 to claim their sixth NCAA soccer title.

== Road to the final ==
The NCAA Division I men's soccer tournament, sometimes known as the College Cup, is an American intercollegiate soccer tournament conducted by the National Collegiate Athletic Association (NCAA), and determines the Division I men's national champion. The tournament has been formally held since 1959, when it was an eight-team tournament. Since then, the tournament has expanded to 48 teams, where every Division I conference tournament champion is allocated a berth.

Akron (BEC)		Round	Virginia (ACC)	
Opponent	Result	NCAA Tournament	Opponent	Result
Bye	—	First round	Bye	—
South Florida (AAC)	2–0 (A)	Second round	Bucknell (Patriot)	5–0 (H)
Stanford (ACC)	2–0 (H)	Regional semifinals	Portland (WCC)	1–0 (A)
Tulsa (AAC)	1–0 (H)	Regional finals	Maryland (ACC)	3–0 (A)
North Carolina (ACC)	0–0 (5–4 p) (H)	College Cup (Final 4)	Wake Forest (ACC)	2–1 (a.e.t.) (A)

== Match details ==
2009 College Cup
13 December 2009
1:00pm EST
Final

Akron	0–0 (a.e.t.)	Virginia
Parrish 26'; Sylla 69'	Report	Burns 80' (pen.)
Penalties
Valentin (penalty missed); Zemanski (penalty scored); Sarkodie (penalty missed); Caldwell (penalty scored); Gavin (penalty missed)	2–3	Tchani (penalty scored); Dimas (penalty scored); Hiller (penalty scored); Villanueva (penalty missed); Monaco (penalty missed)

WakeMed Soccer Park, Cary, NC
Attendance: 5,679
Referee: Chico Grajeda

Akron
Virginia

GK	24	(United States) David Meves
DF	2	(Puerto Rico) Zarek Valentin
DF	3	(United States) Chad Barson
DF	4	(Ghana) Kofi Sarkodie
DF	16	(United States) Chris Korb	(yellow card) 97'
MF	7	(United States) Blair Gavin	(yellow card) 75'
MF	10	(Thailand) Anthony Ampaipitakwong		(substituted off) 48'
MF	13	(United States) Ben Zemanski
MF	17	(United States) Ben Speas
FW	6	(United States) Darlington Nagbe		(substituted off) 59' (substituted in) 67'
FW	12	(Canada) Teal Bunbury
Substitutions:
MF	16	(United States) Scott Caldwell		(substituted in) 48'
FW	11	(Zambia) Yoram Mwila		(substituted in) 59' (substituted off) 67'	(yellow card) 60'
Head Coach:
(United States) Caleb Porter

GK	1	(United States) Diego Restrepo
DF	6	(United States) Greg Monaco
DF	15	(United States) Mike Volk
DF	17	(United States) Hunter Jumper	(yellow card) 40'
DF	21	(United States) Shawn Barry
MF	7	(United States) Neil Barlow	(yellow card) 59'
MF	8	(United States) Ross LaBauex		(substituted off) 98'
MF	10	(United States) Jonathan Villanueva
MF	19	(Greece) Ari Dimas		(substituted off) 68' (substituted in) 98'
MF	23	(Cameroon) Tony Tchani
FW	25	(United States) Will Bates		(substituted off) 59'
Substitutions:
FW	2	(United States) Jordan Evans		(substituted in) 59'
FW	12	(United States) Brian Ownby		(substituted in) 68' (substituted off) (substituted in) 109'
MF	11	(United States) Jimmy Simpson		(substituted in) 100' (substituted off) 109'
Head Coach:
(United States) George Gelnovatch

College Cup MVP
Offensive:
Defensive:

Assistant referees:
Andy Chapin (United States)
Alex Gorin (United States)
Fourth official:
Lou Labbadia (United States)

Match rules:

- 90 minutes.
- 20 minutes of extra time if necessary.
- Penalty shoot-out if scores still level.
- Unlimited substitutes, may not return if subbed out in the first half; may return unlimited times in the second half.

=== Statistics ===
Overall
	Akron	Virginia
Goals scored	0	0
Total shots	12	10
Saves	3	3
Corner kicks	6	4
Offsides	2	1
Yellow cards	3	2
Red cards	0	0
