= 1967 Saint Louis Billikens men's soccer team =

American college soccer season

1967 Saint Louis Billikens men's soccer
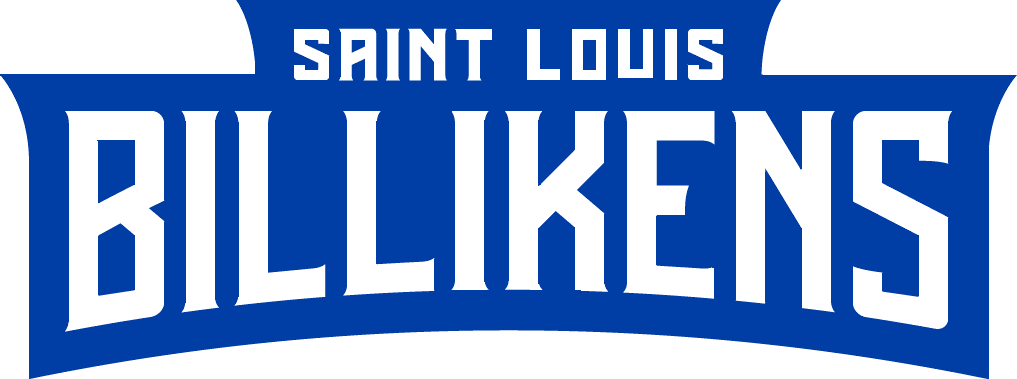

National co-champions

NCAA Tournament, Final, T 0–0 vs. Michigan State
- Conference: Independent
- Record: 8–3–2
- Head coach: Harry Keough (1st season)

The 1967 Saint Louis Billikens men's soccer team represented Saint Louis University during the 1967 NCAA soccer season. The Billikens won their sixth NCAA title this season. It was the sixteenth ever season the Billikens fielded a men's varsity soccer team.

== Background ==
The 1966 season, at the time, was the poorest season by the Saint Louis program. The Billikens failed to reach the semifinals for the first time in program history, being eliminated by eventual champions, San Francisco in the quarterfinals. Then-head coach, Bob Guelker described the result as the end of a dynasty for the university's dominance in college soccer. Guelker cited the increase of programs being fielded by university's making it difficult for teams to field top-heavy teams. Following the conclusion of the 1966 season, Guelker was hired away to coach the newly formed SIU Edwardsville Cougars men's soccer program.

== Roster ==
Note: Flags indicate national team as defined under FIFA eligibility rules; some limited exceptions apply. Players may hold more than one non-FIFA nationality.

No.	Pos.	Nation	Player
1	GK	USA	Jim Conley
2	DF	USA	Gary Rensing
3	DF	USA	Tom Rich
4	DF	USA	Steve Frank
5	DF	USA	Bill McDermott
6	MF	USA	Tom Bokern
7	MF	USA	Wally Werner
8	FW	USA	Dave Schlitt
9	FW	USA	Gene Geimer
10	FW	USA	John Pisani
11	MF	USA	Jack Galmiche
12	MF	USA	Chuck Zoeller
13	DF	USA	Steve Vierling
14	DF	POL	Stanislav Rozanski

No.	Pos.	Nation	Player
15	MF	USA	Rudolph Roeslein
16	MF	USA	Mike Poston
17	FW	USA	Irvin Mueller
18	GK	USA	Bill Donley
19	DF	USA	George Merubia
20	DF	USA	Bob Hoerdeman
21	MF	USA	Tim Brassil
22	FW	USA	Jim Leeker
23	DF	USA	Wayne Fischer
24	DF	USA	Brad Melchior
25	MF	USA	Larry Warren
26	FW	USA	Tom Rich
27	FW	USA	Vince Drake
28	MF	USA	Tom Stahl

== Schedule ==
Date Time, TV	Rank^{#}	Opponent^{#}	Result	Record	Site City, State
Regular season
09-16-1967*		Alumni	L 0–4	0–1–0	SLU Soccer Field; St. Louis
09-23-1967*		Air Force	W 4–1	1–1–0	SLU Soccer Field; St. Louis, Missouri
10-04-1967*		at Southern Illinois	L 4–5	1–2–0	McAndrew Stadium; Carbondale, Illinois
10-11-1967*		at South Florida	W 1–0	2–2–0	Tampa Stadium; Tampa, Florida
10-14-1967*		Rockhurst	W 3–1	3–2–0	SLU Soccer Field; St. Louis
10-21-1967*		Quincy	W 1–0	4–2–0	SLU Soccer Field; St. Louis
10-30-1967*		at Michigan State	T 3–3 ^{OT}	4–2–1	Spartan Stadium; East Lansing, Michigan
11-04-1967*		Indiana	W 4–0	5–2–1	SLU Soccer Field; St. Louis
11-11-1967*		South Florida	L 0–1	5–3–1	SLU Soccer Field; St. Louis
NCAA Tournament
11-18-1967*		Colorado College; First Round	W 6–1	6–3–1	Busch Stadium; St. Louis, Missouri
11-25-1967*		at San Jose State; Quarterfinals	W 4–3	7–3–1	Spartan Stadium; San Jose, California
11-30-1967*		vs. Navy; Semifinals	W 1–0	8–3–1	Spartan Stadium; San Jose, California
12-02-1967*		vs. Michigan State; National Championship	T 0–0 ^{2OT}	8–3–2	Spartan Stadium; San Jose, California
*Non-conference game. ^{#}Rankings from United Soccer Coaches. (#) Tournament seedings in parentheses.
