= 2014 Atlantic 10 men's soccer tournament =

Tournament details
- Country: United States
- Teams: 8

Final positions
- Champions: Fordham
- Runner-up: Rhode Island

Tournament statistics
- Matches played: 6
- Goals scored: 10 (1.67 per match)
- Top goal scorer(s): Jannick Loebe, Robbie Kristo and Mike Casey (2)

Awards
- Best player: Jannick Loebe

The 2014 Atlantic 10 Men's Soccer Tournament, known as the 2014 Atlantic 10 Men's Soccer Tournament Presented by Amtrak for sponsorship reasons, was the eighteenth edition of the tournament. Held from November 13-16, it determined the Atlantic 10 Conference's automatic berth into the 2014 NCAA Division I Men's Soccer Championship.

The tournament was hosted by Virginia Commonwealth University and all matches were contested at Sports Backers Stadium.

== Qualification ==
2014 Atlantic 10 Conference men's soccer standings
	Conf.					Overall
Team	W		L		T	W		L		T
Rhode Island	7	–	1	–	0	13	–	5	–	3
No. 21 Saint Louis +	5	–	1	–	2	14	–	5	–	2
VCU	4	–	1	–	3	7	–	8	–	5
Davidson	4	–	2	–	2	10	–	5	–	3
George Mason	4	–	2	–	2	11	–	4	–	5
Dayton	3	–	3	–	2	7	–	7	–	5
LaSalle	3	–	3	–	2	7	–	9	–	3
Fordham ‡	3	–	3	–	2	8	–	9	–	4
Duquesne	3	–	4	–	1	8	–	7	–	3
George Washington	2	–	4	–	2	6	–	9	–	2
Saint Joseph's	2	–	5	–	1	7	–	7	–	4
UMass	2	–	5	–	1	3	–	14	–	1
Saint Bonaventure	0	–	8	–	0	1	–	15	–	0
‡ - Tournament champion +- Invited to the NCAA Division I Men's Soccer Championship; As of December 16, 2014; Rankings from NSCAA

The top eight teams in the Atlantic 10 Conference based on their conference regular season records qualified for the tournament.

== Bracket ==
Quarterfinals
1	Rhode Island	1
8	Dayton	0
4	George Mason (pen.)	0 (4)
5	Davidson	0 (2)
2	Saint Louis	3
7	La Salle	1
3	VCU	0 (3)
6	Fordham (pen.)	0 (5)

Semifinals
1	Rhode Island (aet)	2
4	George Mason	1
2	Saint Louis	1
6	Fordham	2

Championship
1	Rhode Island	0
6	Fordham	1

== Schedule ==
=== Quarterfinals ===
November 13	Rhode Island Rams	1–0	Dayton Flyers	Richmond, Virginia
11:00 ET	Sykes 14'	Report		Stadium: Sports Backers Stadium; Attendance: 693; Referee: Shaun Papperman

November 13	George Mason Patriots	0–0 (a.e.t.) (4–2 p)	Davidson Wildcats	Richmond, Virginia
14:00 ET		Report		Stadium: Sports Backers Stadium; Attendance: 693; Referee: Cory Richardson
	Penalties
	Mulgrew (penalty scored); Eckenrode (penalty scored); Kemmerer (penalty scored); Herstek (penalty missed); Hoffman (penalty scored)		(penalty scored) MacNamara; (penalty missed) Reiter; (penalty scored) Blades; (penalty missed) Fechter

November 13	Saint Louis Billikens	3–1	La Salle Explorers	Richmond, Virginia
17:00 ET	Bryce 31'; Kristo 72', 80'	Report	Farrell 89'	Stadium: Sports Backers Stadium; Attendance: 693; Referee: Andrew Chapin

November 13	VCU Rams	0–0 (a.e.t.) (3–5 p)	Fordham Rams	Richmond, Virginia
20:00 ET		Report		Stadium: Sports Backers Stadium; Attendance: 693; Referee: Bill Dittmar
	Penalties
	Castillo (penalty scored); Fisher (penalty scored); Herrera-Meraz (penalty missed); Manel (penalty scored)		(penalty scored) Penfold; (penalty scored) Mastilović; (penalty scored) Kelly; (penalty scored) Loebe; (penalty scored) Cupolo

=== Semifinals ===
November 14	Rhode Island Rams	2–1 (a.e.t.)	George Mason Patriots	Richmond, Virginia
17:00 ET	Casey 87' 108'	Report	Hoffman 47'	Stadium: Sports Backers Stadium; Referee: Jeffery Muschik

November 14	Saint Louis Billikens	1–2	Fordham Rams	Richmond, Virginia
19:30 ET	Graydon 81'	Report	Cupolo 29'; Loebe 77'	Stadium: Sports Backers Stadium; Referee: Cory Richardson

=== A-10 Championship ===
November 16	Rhode Island Rams	0–1	Fordham Rams	Richmond, Virginia
13:00 ET		Report	Loebe 46'	Stadium: Sports Backers Stadium; Attendance: 83; Referee: John McCloskey

== See also ==
- Atlantic 10 Conference
- 2014 Atlantic 10 Conference men's soccer season
- 2014 NCAA Division I men's soccer season
- 2014 NCAA Division I Men's Soccer Championship
