= Jan Steadman =

Trinidad and Tobago footballer

Personal information
- Date of birth: 3 November 1947 (age 78)
- Place of birth: Trinidad and Tobago
- Position: Defender

Senior career*
Years	Team	Apps	(Gls)
1967–1968	New York Generals	24	(0)
1971	New York Cosmos	5	(0)
Total		29	(0)

International career
1967–1968	Trinidad and Tobago		
- * Club domestic league appearances and goals

Jan Steadman (born 3 November 1947) is a Trinidadian former footballer who played at both professional and international levels as a defender.

== Career ==
Steadman spent two seasons with the New York Generals, and one season with the New York Cosmos, making a total of 29 appearances.

He also spent time with the Trinidad and Tobago national side, appearing in three FIFA World Cup qualifying matches.
