= 1970 Saint Louis Billikens men's soccer team =

American college soccer season

1970 Saint Louis Billikens men's soccer
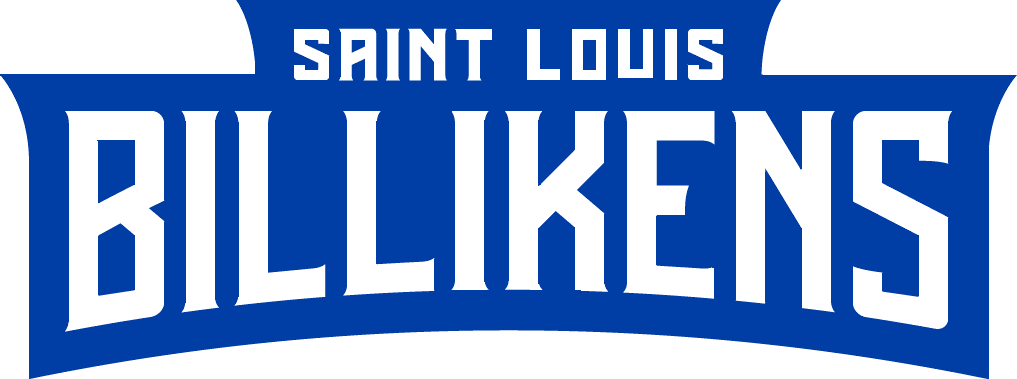

National Champions

NCAA Tournament, Final, W 1–0 vs. UCLA
- Conference: Independent
- Record: 14–0–1
- Head coach: Harry Keough (4th season)
- Captain: Al Trost
- Home stadium: SLU Medical Center Stadium

The 1970 Saint Louis Billikens men's soccer team represented Saint Louis University during the 1970 NCAA soccer season. The Billikens won their eighth NCAA title this season. It was the 12th ever season the Billikens fielded a men's varsity soccer team.

Dan Counce lead the Billikens in scoring this season, amassing 14 goals over the course of the season. Captain, Al Trost won the Hermann Trophy.

== Roster ==
The following individuals played for the Billikens during the 1970 season.

Note: Flags indicate national team as defined under FIFA eligibility rules; some limited exceptions apply. Players may hold more than one non-FIFA nationality.

No.	Pos.	Nation	Player
—	FW	USA	Jim Bokern
—	FW	USA	Dan Counce
—	DF	USA	Mark Demling
—		USA	Jim Draude
—		USA	Joe Eilerman
—		USA	Jim Evans
—		USA	Mike Finnegan
—		USA	Tim Flynn
—		USA	Mark Goegel
—		USA	Bill Gonzalez
—		USA	Jim Guttmann

No.	Pos.	Nation	Player
—		USA	Denny Hadican
—	MF	USA	Joe Hamm
—	MF	USA	Pat Leahy
—		USA	Joe Leeker
—	DF	USA	Bob Matteson
—		USA	Joe McCarthy
—		USA	Ed Neusel
—	FW	USA	Mike Seerey
—		USA	Al Steck
—		USA	Tom Torretti
—	MF	USA	Al Trost
—		USA	Denny Werner

== Schedule ==
Date Time, TV	Rank^{#}	Opponent^{#}	Result	Record	Site City, State
Regular season
September 19*		at Saint Joseph's	W 4–0	1–0–0	Finnesey Field; Philadelphia, PA
September 21*		at Rider	W 6–0	2–0–0	Daly Field; Lawrenceville, NJ
September 25*		Air Force	W 3–0	3–0–0	SLU Medical Center Stadium (1,500); St. Louis, MO
October 3*		vs. St. Louis Stars	W 4–2	4–0–0	Francis Field (3,500); St. Louis, MO
October 10*		at Rockhurst	W 3–0	5–0–0	Swope Park; Kansas City, MO
October 13*		Eastern Illinois	W 5–0	6–0–0	SLU Medical Center Stadium (500); St. Louis, MO
October 17*		at Quincy	T 0–0	6–0–1	QU Stadium; Quincy, IL
October 24*		at South Florida	W 5–1	7–0–1	USF Soccer Field; Tampa, FL
October 25*		UBC	W 5–1	8–0–1	SLU Medical Center Stadium; St. Louis, MO
October 31*		Indiana	W 8–0	9–0–1	SLU Medical Center Stadium; St. Louis, MO
November 7*		at SIU Edwardsville; Bronze Boot	W 3–1	10–0–1	Cougar Field (4,000); Edwardsville, IL
NCAA Tournament
November 21*		vs. Akron; Second Round	W 7–0	10–0–1	Cougar Field (4,000); Edwardsville, IL
November 28*		at SIE Edwardsville; Quarterfinals	W 2–1	11–0–1	Cougar Field (7,500); Edwardsville, IL
December 3*		vs. Hartwick; Semifinals	W 1–0	12–0–1	Cougar Field (5,000); Edwardsville, IL
December 5*		vs. UCLA; Final	W 1–0	13–0–1	Cougar Field (8,000); Edwardsville, IL
*Non-conference game. ^{#}Rankings from United Soccer Coaches. (#) Tournament seedings in parentheses.

== Honors and awards ==
The following players earned a postseason award.

=== National awards ===
- Hermann Trophy
  - Al Trost
- NSCAA All-Americans
  - Al Trost (First-Team All-American)
  - Joe Hamm (Honorable Mention All-American)
