= Barry Mahy =

English footballer (1942–2020)

Personal information
- Date of birth: 21 January 1942
- Place of birth: Guernsey, Channel Islands
- Date of death: 1 October 2020 (aged 78)
- Position: Defender

Senior career*
Years	Team	Apps	(Gls)
1959–1963	Northerners AC		
1963–1967	Scunthorpe United	22	(2)
1967–1968	New York Generals	38	(8)
1971–1975	New York Cosmos	79	(3)

International career
1973	United States	4	(0)
- * Club domestic league appearances and goals

Barry Mahy (21 January 1942 – 1 October 2020) was an English-American association football defender. He began his career with Scunthorpe United and finished it with the New York Cosmos. He also earned four caps with the U.S. national team in 1973.

== Club career ==
While born in Doncaster, Mahy grew up on the island of Guernsey, a British crown dependency. He began his playing career with the Islanders, a non-FIFA affiliated "national" team. In 1963, Dick Duckworth, manager of English Second Division club Scunthorpe United signed Mahy. At the time Scunthorpe was performing poorly and Duckworth was attempting to rebuild the roster mid-season. Despite the changes, Scunthorpe finished at the bottom of the standings and was relegated at the end of the season. Mahy remained with the team through the 1966–1967 season, seeing time in only twenty-two games. In October 1967 when he followed Scunthorpe manager Freddie Goodwin when he moved to the U.S. to coach the New York Generals of the National Professional Soccer League. The NPSL merged with the United Soccer Association in 1968 to form the North American Soccer League. At the end of the 1968 season, the Generals folded. In 1971, Mahy signed with the expansion New York Cosmos and played five seasons with the team.

== National team ==
While Mahy played for the Guernsey national football team, it is not recognized by FIFA. Therefore, he was eligible to play for other, recognized, teams. In 1973, he was called into the U.S. national team. His first game was a 1–0 loss to Haiti on 3 November 1973. He played three more games that November, his last with the national team coming in a 2–0 loss to Israel on 15 November 1973.

== Death ==
Mahy died on 1 October 2020 of unknown causes, aged 78.
