= New York Generals =

American soccer team, based in New York City

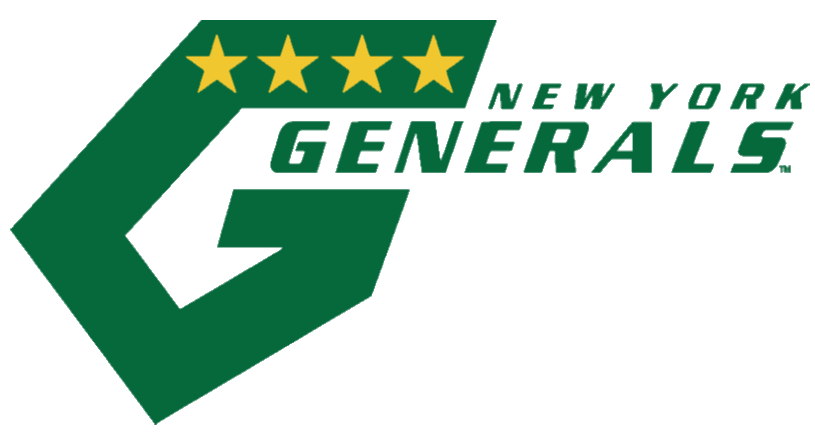
- Full name: New York Generals
- Founded: 1967
- Dissolved: 1968; 58 years ago
- Stadium: Yankee Stadium
- Capacity: 67,000
- Owner(s): RKO General; Peter Elser
- Coach: Freddie Goodwin
- League: NPSL (1967); NASL (1968)
Home colors	Away colors

The New York Generals were an American professional soccer team based in New York City that competed in the National Professional Soccer League (NPSL) in 1967 and the North American Soccer League (NASL) in 1968.

Founded as charter members of the NPSL, the team was owned by RKO General and Wall Street investor Peter Elser and played their home games at Yankee Stadium. Following the NPSL's merger with the United Soccer Association to form the NASL in 1968, the Generals became the sole professional soccer team in New York City. The Generals played on season in the NASL before folding after the 1968 season. The New York Cosmos, founded in 1970, would take the Generals place as New York City's professional soccer team and shared both the Generals' colors and home stadium.

== History ==
From the founding of the National Professional Soccer League (NPSL), New York City was considered was considered a market of immense importance to the league. According to soccer historian David Wagner, New York City's "hugely influential media was likely to make or break the entire venture." The New York Generals were originally founded and owned by RKO General (which at the time also owned WOR-TV) and Wall Street investor Peter Elser. The team's gold and green color scheme was based on that of the Green Bay Packers, which had dominated American football throughout the 1960s, winning the preeminent National Football League championship in 1961, 1962, 1963, 1965, 1966, and 1967, and the first two Super Bowls (in 1966 and 1967, over the rival American Football League champions). The contrasting intermediate shades were also chosen for appearing attractively on black and white television broadcasts, which were still common in the United States at the time. The team's name was chosen as a direct reference to its owner, RKO General. Freddie Goodwin was selected as head coach and quickly assembled a team that included players such as Barrie Wright and César Luis Menotti.

Pre-season training for the team was held at a high school soccer field in Florida. As part of an agreement with the New York Yankees, the Generals played their home games at Yankee Stadium. The team's held their first home game on April 22, 1967, a 2–1 victory against the Chicago Spurs. The Generals finished their sole season in the NPSL with an 11-13 record, with 8 ties.

Following the 1967 season, the NPSL merged with the United Soccer Association (USA) to form the North American Soccer League (NASL). Following the merger, the New York Skyliners of the USA folded, making the New York Generals the sole major soccer team in New York City. While the two teams were initially planned to merge into one team, Peter Elser (who had become the Generals' sole owner following RKO General's withdrawal in January 1968) reversed course and continued to recruit partners and players for the Generals.

Prior to the 1968 season, Gordon Bradley was hired as a player and assistant coach. Bradley had been brought to the attention of the Generals because of his experience as coach and player on the New York Ukrainians. Co Prins also joined the team following the folding of the Pittsburgh Phantoms, which he had been a member of the previous year. Of the 1968 team's 24-man roster, only three players - Dov Markus, Paul Freitag, Gordon Bradley - were American.

While the Generals improved to a 12–8–12 record in 1968, they again failed to qualify for postseason play. A highlight of the season occurred on July 12, when the Generals hosted Santos FC in an exhibition match at Yankee Stadium. The game, a 5–3 win for the Generals, is notable for featuring global soccer superstar Pelé, who would later join the successor New York Cosmos of the NASL in 1975.

Following the 1968 season, the NASL experienced severe hardships as its television contract with CBS expired and multiple teams folded. Famous tennis star Eugene Scott, who had been a director of the Generals, was appointed temporary chairman of the NASL. However, the following year, Phil Woosnam was appointed NASL commissioner and announced plans for a truncated 1969 season that would feature teams from the United Kingdom playing as stand-ins for their American counterparts. Following this, Scott left and the Generals soon after folded, becoming defunct in February 1969. New York City would remain without an NASL franchise until the 1971 season, when the New York Cosmos began play. The Cosmos would share a gold and green color scheme with the Generals and played their home games at the Generals' former home venue, Yankee Stadium. Furthermore, former Generals player and assistant coach Gordon Bradley served as the Cosmos' first head coach.

In spite of team owner RKO General owning various television stations, including WOR-TV, the Generals would only have national television in 1967 with CBS (WCBS-TV locally), but would broadcast 5 matches (including a friendly with Santos) on WPIX on tape delay in 1968.

== Players ==
=== Roster (1968) ===
Source: Note: Flags indicate national team as defined under FIFA eligibility rules; some limited exceptions apply. Players may hold more than one non-FIFA nationality.

No.	Pos.	Nation	Player
1	MF	GER	Herb Finken
2	FW	USA	Dov Markus
3	MF	TTO	Warren Archibald
4	DF	ENG	Tony Singleton
5	FW	ARG	César Menotti
6	FW	TTO	Leroy DeLeon
7	FW	JAM	Neville Oxford
8	DF	ENG	Barry Mahy
9	FW	NED	Co Prins
10	FW	ENG	Michael Ash
11	DF	TTO	Jan Steadman
12	DF	ENG	Barrie Wright

No.	Pos.	Nation	Player
13	MF	ARG	Luis Mas
14	FW	GER	Dieter Perau
16	MF	HAI	Phillipe Vorbe
17	GK	USA	Paul Freitag
18	MF	BRA	Eliseu DeGodoy
19	GK	BRA	Miguel DeLima
20	FW	ENG	George Kirby
21	GK	ENG	Geoff Sidebottom
22	MF	HUN	László Kaszás
23	DF	ARG	Julio Alas
24	DF	USA	Gordon Bradley

== Year-by-year ==
Year	League	W	L	T	Pts	Reg. season	Playoffs
1967	NPSL	11	13	8	143	3rd, Eastern Division	did not qualify
1968	NASL	12	8	12	164	3rd, Atlantic Division	did not qualify

== Notable players ==
- (Argentina) César Menotti (1967–68)
- (Netherlands) Co Prins (1968)

== Bibliography ==
- Blevins, David (2012). The Sports Hall of Fame Encyclopedia: Baseball, Basketball, Football, Hockey, Soccer. Rowman & Littlefield. ISBN 978-0-8108-6130-5 – via Google Books.
- Newsham, Gavin (December 1, 2007). Once in a Lifetime: The Incredible Story of the New York Cosmos. Grove Press. ISBN 978-1-55584-869-9 – via Google Books.
- Plenderleith, Ian (September 22, 2015). Rock 'n' Roll Soccer: The Short Life and Fast Times of the North American Soccer League. Thomas Dunne Books. ISBN 978-1-4668-8400-7 – via Google Books.
- Seese, Dennis J. (March 6, 2015). The Rebirth of Professional Soccer in America: The Strange Days of the United Soccer Association. Rowman & Littlefield. ISBN 978-1-4422-3895-4 – via Google Books.
- Wangerin, Dave (2006). Soccer in a Football World. WSC Books Limited. ISBN 978-0-9540134-7-9 – via Google Books.
