= Dov Markus =

Israeli-American soccer player

Personal information
- Date of birth: January 31, 1946 (age 80)
- Place of birth: Donbas, Ukrainian SSR, Soviet Union (now Ukraine)
- Position: Forward

College career
Years	Team	Apps	(Gls)
1965–67	LIU Brooklyn Blackbirds		

Senior career*
Years	Team	Apps	(Gls)
1968	New York Generals	1	(0)
- * Club domestic league appearances and goals

Dov Markus (born January 31, 1946) is an Israeli-American former soccer player. At Long Island University he was the first recipient of the Hermann Trophy, as the outstanding collegiate soccer player of the year, and was a two-time All American. In 1965 as a sophomore, Markus scored 35 goals in 14 games for 70 points, at the time both the most-ever goals and the most-ever points in an NCAA season. Over his three-year career, Markus scored 79 goals, setting a new NCAA career record, in 49 games. Markus played a season with the New York Generals of the North American Soccer League, and played in the 1969 Maccabiah Games in Israel for the United States.

== Early and personal life ==
Markus was born in Donbas, Ukrainian SSR, Soviet Union (now Ukraine), and is Jewish.

== Career ==
Markus attended Long Island University (LIU), for which he played on the men's soccer team (the Blackbirds) for three seasons, from 1965 to 1967. He played center forward.

In 1965 as a sophomore, Markus scored 35 goals in 14 games for 70 points, at the time both the most-ever goals and the most-ever points in an NCAA season. His 5.00 points per game at the time were third-most for a season in NCAA history. His 2.50 goals per game were the most in NCAA history. He scored 27 goals as a junior, and 16 goals as a senior.

Over his three-year career, Markus scored 79 goals, setting a new NCAA career record, in 49 games. In his career he had 156 points, and his 3.25 points per game were 7th in NCAA history.

Markus won the 1967 Hermann Trophy as the outstanding collegiate soccer player of the year. He was the first recipient of the Hermann Trophy. He was named Honorable Mention All American in 1965, and Second Team All American in 1967. In 2000, LIU inducted Markus into its Athletic Hall of Fame.

After his collegiate career, Markus played a season (1968) with the New York Generals of the North American Soccer League.

Markus played in the 1969 Maccabiah Games in Israel for the United States.

In the mid-1970s and early-80s, Markus taught at Sheepshead Bay High School in Brooklyn, New York. He also refereed NCAA games. He retired before 2000.

== See also ==
- List of Hermann Trophy men's winners
- List of NCAA Division I men's soccer career goals leaders
- List of NCAA Division I men's soccer season goals leaders
