= 2014 Atlantic 10 Conference men's soccer season =

- League: NCAA Division I
- Sport: Soccer
- Duration: August, 2014 – November, 2014

Tournament
- Champions: Fordham
- Runners-up: Rhode Island

A-10 men's soccer seasons
- ← 2013 2015 →

2014 Atlantic 10 Conference men's soccer standings
	Conf.					Overall
Team	W		L		T	W		L		T
Rhode Island	7	–	1	–	0	13	–	5	–	3
No. 21 Saint Louis +	5	–	1	–	2	14	–	5	–	2
VCU	4	–	1	–	3	7	–	8	–	5
Davidson	4	–	2	–	2	10	–	5	–	3
George Mason	4	–	2	–	2	11	–	4	–	5
Dayton	3	–	3	–	2	7	–	7	–	5
LaSalle	3	–	3	–	2	7	–	9	–	3
Fordham ‡	3	–	3	–	2	8	–	9	–	4
Duquesne	3	–	4	–	1	8	–	7	–	3
George Washington	2	–	4	–	2	6	–	9	–	2
Saint Joseph's	2	–	5	–	1	7	–	7	–	4
UMass	2	–	5	–	1	3	–	14	–	1
Saint Bonaventure	0	–	8	–	0	1	–	15	–	0
‡ - Tournament champion +- Invited to the NCAA Division I Men's Soccer Championship; As of December 16, 2014; Rankings from NSCAA

The 2014 Atlantic 10 Conference men's soccer season was the 19th season of men's varsity soccer in the conference.

Sixth-seeded Fordham defeated top-seeded Rhode Island in the championship game of the Atlantic 10 tournament to earn the conference's automatic berth into the NCAA tournament. It was their second Atlantic 10 title and the first since 1996.
