= 1972 Saint Louis Billikens men's soccer team =

American college soccer season

1972 Saint Louis Billikens men's soccer

National Champions

NCAA Tournament
- Conference: Independent
- Record: 15–2–3
- Head coach: Harry Keough (6th season)

The 1972 Saint Louis Billikens men's soccer team represented Saint Louis University during the 1972 NCAA University Division soccer season. The Billikens won their ninth NCAA title this season. It was the fifteenth ever season the Billikens fielded a men's varsity soccer team.

== Schedule ==
| Date Time, TV | Rank^{#} | Opponent^{#} | Result | Record | Site City, State |
Regular season
| 09-09-1972* | | at UMSL | L 0–1 | 0–1–0 | Don Dallas Soccer Field; St. Louis, MO |
| 09-16-1972* | | Green Bay | W 1–0 | 1–1–0 | Forest Park Soccer Field; St. Louis, MO |
| 09-19-1972* | | at MacMurray | W 11–0 | 2–1–0 | Community Park; Jacksonville, IL |
| 09-23-1972* | | at Air Force | W 5–1 | 3–1–0 | Falcon Stadium; Colorado Springs, CO |
| 09-24-1972* | | at Metro State | W 7–1 | 4–1–0 | City Park; Denver, CO |
| 09-25-1972* | | at Washington | T 0–0 ^{2OT} | 4–1–1 | Husky Stadium; Seattle, WA |
| 09-26-1972* | | at Seattle Pacific | T 1–1 ^{2OT} | 4–1–2 | SPU Soccer Field; Seattle, WA |
| 09-28-1972* | | at San Francisco | W 1–0 | 5–1–2 | Kezar Stadium; San Francisco, CA |
| 09-30-1972* | | at San Francisco | W 4–1 | 6–1–2 | Kezar Stadium; San Francisco, CA |
| 10-07-1972* | | Wheaton | W 5–0 | 7–1–2 | Forest Park Soccer Field; St. Louis, MO |
| 10-08-1972* | | Cleveland State | W 4–1 | 8–1–2 | Forest Park Soccer Field; St. Louis, MO |
| 10-14-1972* | | at Rockhurst | W 3–0 | 9–1–2 | Swope Park; Kansas City, MO |
| 10-21-1972* | | at Quincy | L 0–1 | 9–2–2 | QU Stadium; Quincy, IL |
| 10-28-1972* | | South Florida | W 1–0 ^{OT} | 10–2–2 | Forest Park Soccer Field; St. Louis, MO |
| 11-05-1972* | | vs. SIU Edwardsville; Bronze Boot | T 1–1 ^{OT} | 10–2–3 | Busch Stadium; St. Louis, MO |
| 11-18-1972* | | UIC | W 7–0 | 11–2–3 | Forest Park Soccer Field; St. Louis, MO |
NCAA Tournament
| 11-23-1972* | | Bowling Green; First round | W 2–0 | 12–2–3 | Busch Stadium; St. Louis, MO |
| 12-08-1972* | | at Ohio; Quarterfinals | W 2–1 | 13–2–3 | Peden Stadium; Athens, OH |
| 12-27-1972* | | vs. Howard; Semifinals | W 2–1 ^{OT} | 14–2–3 | Orange Bowl (3,000); Miami, FL |
| 12-29-1972* | | vs. UCLA; Final | W 4–2 | 15–2–3 | Orange Bowl (3,000); Miami, FL |
*Non-conference game. ^{#}Rankings from United Soccer Coaches. (#) Tournament seedings in parentheses.
