= Barrie Wright =

English footballer

Personal information
- Date of birth: 6 November 1945 (age 80)
- Place of birth: Bradford, England
- Height: 1.73 m (5 ft 8 in)
- Position: Left back

Senior career*
Years	Team	Apps	(Gls)
1962–1966	Leeds United	5	(0)
1967–1968	New York Generals	68	(0)
1969–1970	Brighton & Hove Albion	10	(0)
1970	→ Hartlepool United (loan)	0	(0)
- Bradford Park Avenue
- Gainsborough Trinity
- Thackley
Total		83	(0)
- * Club domestic league appearances and goals

Barrie Wright (born 6 November 1945) is an English former professional footballer who played as a left back. Active in England and the United States, Wright made nearly 100 appearances in an 8-year career.

== Career ==
Born in Bradford, Wright played professionally in England and the United States for Leeds United, the New York Generals, Brighton & Hove Albion, Hartlepool United, Bradford Park Avenue, Gainsborough Trinity and Thackley.
