= 2009 Virginia Cavaliers men's soccer team =

American college soccer season

2009 Virginia Cavaliers men's soccer

National Champions

ACC Men's Soccer Tournament Champions Portland Nike Invitational Champions

NCAA Tournament, College Cup vs. Akron, W 1–0
- Conference: Atlantic Coast Conference

Ranking
- Coaches: No. 1
- Record: 18–3–4 (4–3–1 ACC)
- Head coach: George Gelnovatch (14th season)
- Home stadium: Klöckner Stadium

2009 ACC men's soccer standings
	Conf.					Overall
Team	W		L		T	W		L		T
No. 3 Wake Forest‡	5	–	2	–	1	17	–	4	–	3
No. 4 North Carolina+	5	–	2	–	1	16	–	2	–	4
No. 18 Boston College+	5	–	3	–	0	14	–	9	–	0
No. 6 Maryland+	4	–	2	–	2	15	–	6	–	2
No. 1 Virginia‡	4	–	3	–	1	18	–	3	–	4
No. 12 Duke+	4	–	4	–	0	14	–	7	–	0
NC State+	2	–	5	–	1	13	–	7	–	2
Virginia Tech	2	–	6	–	0	5	–	12	–	2
Clemson	2	–	6	–	0	6	–	12	–	1
‡ – 2009 ACC Tournament champion + – Invited to the 2009 NCAA Division I Men's Soccer Tournament; As of 16 December 2009; Rankings from NSCAA

The 2009 Virginia Cavaliers men's soccer team represented the University of Virginia during the 2009 NCAA Division I men's soccer season. It was the Cavaliers' 69th season fielding a men's varsity soccer program, and the program's 56th season playing in the Atlantic Coast Conference.

The Cavaliers had one of their most successful seasons in program history, winning both the ACC Men's Soccer Tournament, and the NCAA Division I Men's Soccer Tournament. The Cavs won their first ACC Tournament title since 2004, and their first NCAA Tournament title since 1994. It was head coach George Gelnovatch's first year winning the NCAA title. Altogether, it was the Cavs' sixth national championship season. Additionally, the Cavs won the minor early season Portland/Nike Invitational. The Cavaliers also finish first in the National Soccer Coaches Association of America rankings for the first time since 1994.

== Background ==
The Cavaliers came off a season where they finished 11–9–1 across all competitions and 4–4 in ACC play. The Cavaliers finished fourth in the ACC and earned a berth into the ACC Men's Soccer Tournament. Virginia reached the ACC Championship where they lost to eventual NCAA champions, Maryland, 1–0. Their run in the ACC Tournament secured an at-large bid into the 2008 NCAA Division I Men's Soccer Tournament seeded 10th, ensuring a second round bye. Virginia lost in the Second Round of the tournament to Connecticut, 2–0.

== Roster ==
Note: Flags indicate national team as defined under FIFA eligibility rules; some limited exceptions apply. Players may hold more than one non-FIFA nationality.

No.	Pos.	Nation	Player
1	GK	USA	Diego Restrepo
2	FW	USA	Jordan Evans
6	DF	USA	Greg Monaco
7	DF	USA	Neil Barlow
8	MF	USA	Ross LaBauex
9	FW	USA	Chase Neinken
10	MF	USA	Jonathan Villanueva
11	MF	USA	Jimmy Simpson
12	FW	USA	Brian Ownby
13	MF	USA	Howard Turk

No.	Pos.	Nation	Player
15	DF	USA	Mike Volk
16	DF	USA	Sean Hiller
17	DF	USA	Hunter Jumper
19	MF	GRE	Ari Dimas
20	FW	USA	Chris Agorsor
21	DF	USA	Shawn Barry
23	MF	CMR	Tony Tchani
25	FW	USA	Will Bates
26	FW	USA	Ahkeel Rodney

== Schedule ==
Date Time, TV	Rank^{#}	Opponent^{#}	Result	Record	Site (Attendance) City, State
Preseason
08/21/2009*; 7:00 pm	No. 15	George Mason	L 0–1 ^{(a.e.t.)}		Klöckner Stadium (Not reported); Charlottesville, VA
08/24/2009*; 7:00 pm	No. 15	at No. 25 Old Dominion	L 1–3		ODU Soccer Complex (Not reported); Norfolk, VA
08/30/2009*; 7:00 pm	No. 15	at West Virginia	L 0–2		Klöckner Stadium (Not reported); Charlottesville, VA
Regular season
09/04/2009*; 10:00 pm	No. 22	at Portland; Portland Nike Invitational	W 3–0	1–0–0	Merlo Field (2,122); Portland, OR
09/06/2009*; 3:00 pm	No. 22	vs. Washington; Portland Nike Invitational	W 2–1 ^{(a.e.t.)}	2–0–0	Merlo Field (726); Portland, OR
09/11/2009; 7:00 pm	No. 16	No. 19 Duke	L 0–1 ^{(a.e.t.)}	2–1–0 (0–1–0)	Klöckner Stadium; Charlottesville, VA
09/15/2009*; 7:00 pm	No. 20	Mount St. Mary's	W 1–0	3–1–0	Klöckner Stadium; Charlottesville, VA
09/18/2009; 7:00 pm, ACCN	No. 20	at No. 2 Wake Forest	W 1–0	4–1–0 (1–1–0)	Spry Stadium; Winston-Salem, NC
09/22/2009*; 7:00 pm	No. 11	George Washington	W 2–1 ^{(a.e.t.)}	5–1–0	Klöckner Stadium; Charlottesville, VA
09/26/2009; 7:00 pm, ACCN	No. 11	Clemson	L 0–1	5–2–0 (1–2–0)	Klöckner Stadium; Charlottesville, VA
09/29/2009*; 7:00 pm	No. 12	VCU	W 1–0 ^{(a.e.t.)}	6–2–0	Klöckner Stadium; Charlottesville, VA
10/02/2009; 7:00 pm, FSC	No. 12	at No. 5 North Carolina; South's Oldest Rivalry	L 0–1 ^{(a.e.t.)}	6–3–0 (1–3–0)	Fetzer Field; Chapel Hill, NC
10/07/2009*; 7:00 pm	No. 13	Longwood	W 2–0	7–3–0	Klöckner Stadium; Charlottesville, VA
10/13/2009*; 7:00 pm	No. 11	Liberty	T 1–1 ^{(a.e.t.)}	7–3–1	Klöckner Stadium; Charlottesville, VA
10/17/2009; 7:00 pm, FSC	No. 11	at Virginia Tech; Commonwealth Cup	W 3–1	8–3–1 (2–3–0)	Thompson Field; Blacksburg, VA
10/20/2009*; 7:00 pm	No. 12	Howard	W 2–0	9–3–1	Klöckner Stadium; Charlottesville, VA
10/25/2009; 7:00 pm, ACCN+	No. 12	Boston College	W 2–0	10–3–1 (3–3–0)	Klöckner Stadium; Charlottesville, VA
10/31/2009; 7:00 pm, FSC	No. 10	at No. 6 Maryland; Rivalry	T 0–0 ^{(a.e.t.)}	10–3–2 (3–3–1)	Ludwig Field; College Park, MD
11/03/2009*; 7:00 pm	No. 7	American	W 3–0	11–3–2	Klöckner Stadium; Charlottesville, VA
11/07/2009; 7:00 pm, ACCN+	No. 7	No. 18 NC State	W 1–0	12–3–2	Klöckner Stadium; Charlottesville, VA
ACC Tournament
11/11/2009; 7:00 pm, ACCN	(4) No. 6	vs. (5) No. 5 Maryland; Quarterfinals	W 1–0	13–3–2	WakeMed Soccer Park; Cary, NC
11/13/2009; 7:00 pm, ACCN	(4) No. 6	vs. (1) No. 3 Wake Forest; Semifinals	T 0–0; W (5–4 p) ^{(a.e.t.)}	13–3–3	WakeMed Soccer Park (1,170); Cary, NC
11/15/2009; 7:00 pm, ACCN	(4) No. 6	vs. (7) No. 20 NC State; ACC Championship	W 1–0	14–3–3	WakeMed Soccer Park; Cary, NC
NCAA Tournament
11/22/2009*; 1:00 pm	(2) No. 2	Bucknell; Second Round	W 5–0	15–3–3	Klöckner Stadium; Charlottesville, VA
11/29/2009*; 1:00 pm	(2) No. 2	Portland; Third Round	W 1–0	16–3–3	Klöckner Stadium; Charlottesville, VA
12/04/2009; 7:00 pm	(2) No. 2	No. 13 Maryland; Quarterfinals	W 3–0	17–3–3	Klöckner Stadium; Charlottesville, VA
12/11/2009; 5:00 pm, ESPN2	(2) No. 2	vs. (3) No. 3 Wake Forest; Semifinals	W 2–1 ^{(a.e.t.)}	18–3–3	WakeMed Soccer Park; Cary, NC
12/13/2009*; 1:00 pm, ESPN2	(2) No. 2	vs. (1) No. 1 Akron; National Championship	T 0–0; W (3–2 p) ^{(a.e.t.)}	18–3–4	WakeMed Soccer Park; Cary, NC
*Non-conference game. ^{#}Rankings from United Soccer Coaches. (#) Tournament seedings in parentheses.

== Rankings ==
Ranking movements Legend: ██ Increase in ranking ██ Decrease in ranking
	Week													
Poll	Pre	1	2	3	4	5	6	7	8	9	10	11	12	Final
NSCAA	22	22	16	20	11	12	13	11	11	12	10	7	6	1
