= Neville Oxford =

Jamaican footballer (born 1948)

Personal information
- Full name: Neville Dwight Oxford
- Date of birth: 18 November 1948 (age 77)
- Place of birth: Kingston, Colony of Jamaica
- Height: 5 ft 10 in (1.78 m)
- Position: Forward

Senior career*
Years	Team	Apps	(Gls)
- Cavalier
1967–1968	New York Generals	11	(1)

International career
	Jamaica	24	
- * Club domestic league appearances and goals

Neville Dwight Oxford (born 18 November 1948) is a Jamaican former footballer who played at both professional and international levels as a forward.

== Career ==
Oxford spent two seasons with the New York Generals, making 11 appearances, having previously played for Cavalier in Jamaica.

He also spent time with the Jamaican national side, making his debut for the country at the age of 16. During his career, Oxford made 24 appearances for Jamaica.

== Personal life ==
Oxford's brother Karl has a grandson, Reece Oxford, who is also a professional footballer.
