= 1962 Saint Louis Billikens men's soccer team =

American college soccer season

1962 Saint Louis Billikens men's soccer
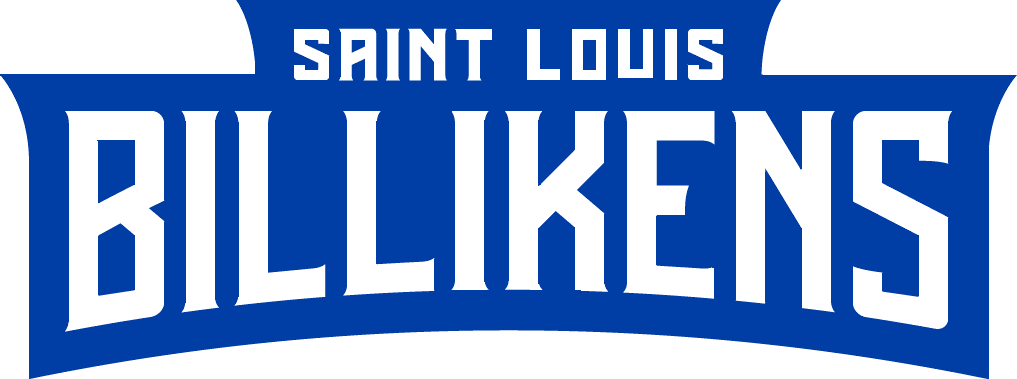

National Champions

NCAA Tournament, W 4–3 vs. Maryland
- Conference: Independent
- Record: 12–0–1
- Head coach: Bob Guelker (5th season)

The 1962 Saint Louis Billikens men's soccer team represented Saint Louis University during the 1962 NCAA Division I men's soccer season. The Billikens won their third NCAA title this season. It was the fifth ever season the Billikens fielded a men's varsity soccer team.

== Schedule ==
Date Time, TV	Rank^{#}	Opponent^{#}	Result	Record	Site City, State
Regular season
09-29-1962*		at Indiana	W 6–1	1–0–0	Bloomington, IN
10-06-1962*		at Notre Dame	T 3–3	1–0–1	Notre Dame, IN
10-10-1962*		Harris Teachers	W 2–1	2–0–1	St. Louis, MO
10-13-1962*		at Navy Pier	W 6–1	3–0–1	Chicago, IL
10-17-1962*		at Indiana Tech	W 14–0	4–0–1	Fort Wayne, IN
10-20-1962*		Illinois	W 7–0	5–0–1	St. Louis, MO
10-25-1962*		Washington University	W 2–1	6–0–1	St. Louis, MO
10-27-1962*		Chicago	W 13–0	7–0–1	St. Louis, MO
11-03-1962*		Wheaton	W 3–0	8–0–1	St. Louis, MO
11-10-1962*		Michigan State	W 2–1	9–0–1	St. Louis, MO
NCAA Tournament
11-17-1962*		Stanford; First Round	W 9–3	10–0–1	St. Louis, MO
11-22-1962*		Michigan State; Semifinals	W 2–0	11–0–1	St. Louis, MO
11-24-1962*		Maryland; Final	W 4–3	12–0–1	St. Louis, MO
*Non-conference game. ^{#}Rankings from United Soccer Coaches. (#) Tournament seedings in parentheses.
