= 1967 Michigan State Spartans men's soccer team =

Michigan State 1967 soccer season

1967 Michigan State Spartans men's soccer

National co-champions

NCAA Tournament, College Cup vs. Saint Louis, T 0–0
- Conference: Independent
- Record: 12–0–2
- Head coach: Gene Kenney (12th season)
- Home stadium: Old College Field

The 1967 Michigan State Spartans men's soccer team represented Michigan State University during the 1967 NCAA soccer season. The Spartans played at Spartan Stadium in East Lansing, Michigan and were coached by 12th-year head coach, Gene Kenney. The Spartans competed as an independent.

The 1967 season was one of the most successful season in program history, as they were declared NCAA co-champions along with the Saint Louis Billikens, making it one of two seasons the Spartans won the NCAA title in men's soccer. The team was considered to be part of the 1960s golden age of Michigan State sports, where their wrestling and football teams also won national titles during that time.

== Roster ==
The following players are known to be part of the team's 1967 roster.

Note: Flags indicate national team as defined under FIFA eligibility rules; some limited exceptions apply. Players may hold more than one non-FIFA nationality.

No.	Pos.	Nation	Player
—	MF	(United States) USA	Alex Skotarek
—	FW	(United States) USA	Gary McBrady
—	FW	(Jamaica) JAM	Trevor Harris
—	FW	(Jamaica) JAM	Tony Keyes
—	MF	(United States) USA	Ernie Tuscherer
—	GK	(United States) USA	Joe Baum
—	FW	(United States) USA	Guy Busch
—	FW	(United States) USA	Tom Kreft
—	DF	(United States) USA	Peter Hens
—	DF	(United States) USA	Ken Hamann
—	FW	(United States) USA	John Zensen

No.	Pos.	Nation	Player
—	DF	(United States) USA	Ed Skotararek
—	DF	(United States) USA	Bert Jacobsen
—	DF	(United States) USA	Tom Belloli
—	DF	(United States) USA	Denny Boles
—	DF	(United States) USA	Terry Sanders
—	DF	(United States) USA	Nick Archer
—	FW	(United States) USA	Bill Myerson
—	MF	(United States) USA	Barry Tiemann
—	FW	(United States) USA	Rich Nelke
—	GK	(United States) USA	Orhan Enuston
—	FW	(United States) USA	Dave Trace

== Schedule ==
Date Time, TV	Rank^{#}	Opponent^{#}	Result	Record	Site City, State
Regular season
09/23/1967*		Purdue	W 11–0	1–0–0	Old College Field; East Lansing, Michigan
09/26/1967*		Calvin	W 7–1	2–0–0	Old College Field; East Lansing, Michigan
09/30/1967*		at Pittsburgh	W 1–0	3–0–0	Pitt Stadium; Pittsburgh
10/06/1967*		at Denver	W 3–1	4–0–0	All-City Stadium; Denver, Colorado
10/08/1967*		at Air Force	W 4–0	5–0–0	Falcon Stadium; Colorado Springs, Colorado
10/14/1967*		at Akron	W 4–2	6–0–0	Old College Field; East Lansing, Michigan
10/18/1967*		at Ball State	W 11–0	6–0–0	Cardinal Stadium; Muncie, Indiana
10/21/1967*		Denison	W 12–1	7–0–0	Old College Field; East Lansing, Michigan
10/30/1967*		Saint Louis	T 3–3	8–0–1	Old College Field; East Lansing, Michigan
11/03/1967*		Ohio	W 6–1	9–0–1	Peden Stadium; Athens, Ohio
NCAA Tournament
11/18/1967*		Maryland; Round of 16	W 4–1	10–0–1	Old College Field; East Lansing, Michigan
11/25/1967*		Akron; Quarterfinals	W 3–1	11–0–1	Old College Field; East Lansing, Michigan
11/30/1967*		Long Island; Semifinals	W 4–0	12–0–1	Busch Memorial Stadium; St. Louis, Missouri
12/02/1967*		Saint Louis; National Championship	T 0–0	12–0–2	Busch Memorial Stadium; St. Louis, Missouri
*Non-conference game. ^{#}Rankings from United Soccer Coaches. (#) Tournament seedings in parentheses.
