= 2009 NCAA Division I men's soccer tournament =

Men's College Cup (semifinals & final)
- 2009 Division I Men's College Cup logo

Tournament details
- Country: United States
- Teams: 48

Final positions
- Champions: Virginia Cavaliers
- Runners-up: Akron Zips

Tournament statistics
- Matches played: 47
- Goals scored: 120 (2.55 per match)
- Top goal scorer: Will Bates (4)

The 2009 NCAA Division I men's soccer tournament was a tournament of 48 teams from NCAA Division I who played for the NCAA Championship in soccer . The semifinals and final were held at WakeMed Soccer Park in Cary, North Carolina. All the other games were played at the home field of the higher seeded team (indicated by * for non-seeded teams). The final was held on December 13, 2009 with Virginia defeating Akron, 3–2 in a penalty shoot-out, following a goalless regulation and two overtimes.

The bracket was announced November 16, 2009. The tournament started on November 19. The second round was played on November 22. The third round was played on November 29. The Regional Finals were played on December 4 and 5.

== Regional 1 ==
First round
*South Florida (13–3–1)	2
Stetson (14–3–2)	1
*Stanford (10–5–2)	3
St. Mary's (CA) (10–4–5)	0
*Notre Dame (10–7–4)	2
Green Bay (14–2–3)	1
*Saint Louis (14–6–0)	2
Missouri St. (12–4–2)	1

Second round
South Florida (14–3–1)	0
1	Akron (20–0–0)	2
16	UC-Irvine (15–6–0)	0
Stanford (11–5–2)	1
Notre Dame (11–7–4)	1
9	Northwestern (10–4–4)	3
8	Tulsa (13–4–2)	4/OT
Saint Louis (15–6–0)	3

Regional semifinals
1	Akron (21–0–0)	2
Stanford (12–5–2)	0
9	Northwestern (11–4–4)	0
8	Tulsa (14–4–2)	1

Regional Finals
1	Akron (22–0–0)	1
8	Tulsa (15–4–2)	0

== Regional 2 ==
First round
*Brown (10–2–5)	1/2OT
Stony Brook (6–9–4)	0
*Indiana (10–9–1)	2
Louisville (13–2–4)	0
*Boston College (12–8–0)	2/2OT
Dartmouth (10–6–1)	1
*Drake (13–6–2)	2
Western Illinois (8–9–2)	1

Second round
Brown (11–2–5)	0
5	North Carolina (13–2–3)	2
12	Butler (14–2–2)	0
Indiana (11–9–1)	1
Boston College (13–8–0)	1
13	St. John's (9–2–9)	0
4	Ohio State (12–4–4)	0
Drake (14–6–2)	1/OT

Regional semifinals
5	North Carolina (14–2–3)	1
Indiana (12–9–1)	0
Boston College (14–8–0)	4
Drake (15–6–2)	6

Regional Finals
5	North Carolina (15–2–3)	2
Drake (16–6–2)	1

== Regional 3 ==
First round
*Charlotte (11–3–5)	1(1)
UNC-Wilmington (14–2–4)	1(4)
*Duke (12–6–0)	3
Winthrop (11–5–4)	2
*UC-Santa Barbara (15–4–2)	1
Wofford (12–2–3)	0
*Loyola-Marymount (10–8–2)	1
Sacramento St. (11–5–3)	2/OT

Second round
UNC-Wilmington (14–2–5)	1
3	Wake Forest (14–3–3)	2
14	Michigan State (11–7–2)	1
Duke (13–6–0)	2
UC-Santa Barbara (16–4–2)	1
11	San Diego (12–5–2)	0
6	UCLA (10–3–4)	2
Sacramento St. (12–5–3)	1

Regional semifinals
3	Wake Forest (15–3–3)	4
Duke (14–6–0)	2
UC-Santa Barbara (17–4–2)	1
6	UCLA (11–3–4)	2

Regional Finals
3	Wake Forest (16–3–3)	2
6	UCLA (12–3–4)	0

== Regional 4 ==
First round
*Maryland (12–5–2)	2
Loyola (MD) (11–7–3)	1
*Monmouth (18–1–1)	0(4)
Connecticut (11–4–3)	0(3)
*New Mexico (12–6–1)	1
Portland (10–5–5)	2/OT
*Princeton (9–5–3)	0
Bucknell (16–5–0)	1

Second round
Maryland (13–5–2)	2
7	Penn State (12–7–2)	1
10	Harvard (13–3–1)	3
Monmouth (18–1–2)	0
Portland (11–5–5)	2
15	NC State (13–6–2)	1
2	Virginia (14–3–3)	5
Bucknell (17–5–0)	0

Regional semifinals
Maryland (14–5–2)	2
10	Harvard (14–3–1)	0
Portland (12–5–5)	0
2	Virginia (15–3–3)	1

Regional Finals
Maryland (15–5–2)	0
2	Virginia (16–3–3)	3

== College Cup ==
All matches held in WakeMed Soccer Park, Cary, NC

National semifinals December 11
1	Akron (23–0–0)	0 (5)
5	North Carolina (16–2–3)	0 (4)
3	Wake Forest (17–3–3)	1
2	Virginia (17–3–3)	2 (a.e.t.)

National Championship; December 13
1	Akron (23–0–1)	0 (2)
2	Virginia (18–3–3)	0 (3)

== Schedule ==
Host team, or higher seed, is listed on the Left. Away team or lower seed is listed on the right.

=== First Round ===
v

v

v

v

v

v

v

v

v

v

v

v

v

v

v

v

=== Second Round ===
v

v

v

v

v

v

v

v

v

v

v

v

v

v

v

v

=== Third Round ===
v

v

v

v

v

v

v

v

=== Quarterfinals ===
v

v

v

v

=== Semifinals ===
December 11, 2009	#1 Akron	0-0 (5–4 p)	#5 North Carolina	Cary, North Carolina
5:30pm EST				Stadium: WakeMed Soccer Park; Attendance: 8,862; Referee: Alex Prus
	Penalties
	Valentin (penalty scored); Zemanski (penalty scored); Sarkodie (penalty scored); Caldwell (penalty scored); Gavin (penalty scored)		(penalty scored) Farfan; (penalty scored) Loyd; (penalty missed) Graye; (penalty scored) McKinney; (penalty scored) Urso

December 11, 2009	#3 Wake Forest	1–2 OT	#2 Virginia	Cary, North Carolina
8:00pm EST	Bone 70'	Report	Tchani 55'; Ownby 93'	Stadium: WakeMed Soccer Park; Attendance: 8,862; Referee: Misail Tsapos

=== Championship ===
December 13, 2009	#1 Akron	0-0 (a.e.t.) (2–3 p)	#2 Virginia	Cary, NC
1:00pm EST		Report		Stadium: WakeMed Soccer Park; Attendance: 5,679; Referee: Chico Grajeda
	Penalties
	Valentin (penalty missed); Zemanski (penalty scored); Sarkodie (penalty missed); Caldwell (penalty scored); Gavin (penalty missed)		(penalty scored) Tchani; (penalty scored) Dimas; (penalty scored) Hiller; (penalty missed) Villanueva; (penalty missed) Monaco

== Goal scorers ==
4 goals

- (United States) Will Bates – Virginia

3 goals

- (Thailand) Anthony Ampaipitakwong – Akron
- (United States) Luke Gorczyca – Drake
- (United States) Alex Dixon – North Carolina
- (United States) David Walker – UC Santa Barbara
- (United States) Zack Schilawski – Wake Forest

2 goals

- (Canada) Kyle Bekker – Boston College
- (United States) Karl Reddick – Boston College
- (United States) Kevin Shrout – Drake
- (United States) Garrett Webb – Drake
- (United States) Ryan Finley – Duke
- (United States) Darren Yeagle – Indiana
- (United States) Billy Cortes – Maryland
- (United States) Casey Townsend – Maryland
- (United States) Jack Hillgard – Northwestern
- (United States) Collen Warner – Portland
- (United States) James Dice – Saint Louis
- (United States) Alex Sweetin -Saint Louis
- (United States) Austin Neil – Tulsa
- (Cameroon) Tony Tchani – Virginia
- (United States) Austin da Luz – Wake Forest

1 goal

- (United States) Teal Bunbury – Akron
- (United States) Kofi Sarkodie – Akron
- (Israel) Mori Avi Hana – Boston College
- (New Zealand) Colin Murphy – Boston College
- (United States) Charlie Rugg – Boston College
- (Canada) Sean Rosa – Brown
- (United States) Brendan Burgforf – Bucknell
- (United States) Adam Gross – Charlotte
- (New Zealand) Dan Keat – Dartmouth
- (United States) Matt Kuhn – Drake
- (United States) Kenan Malicevic – Drake
- (United States) Michael Noonan – Drake
- (United States) Cole Grossman – Duke
- (United States) Trae Harrison – Duke
- (United States) Christian Ibeagha – Duke
- (United States) Ryan McDaniel – Duke
- (United States) Andrew Wenger – Duke
- (United States) Tony Walls – Green Bay
- (United States) Andre Akpan – Harvard
- (United States) Adam Rousmaniere – Harvard
- (England) Richard Smith – Harvard
- (United States) Will Bruin – Indiana
- (England) Phil Bannister – Loyola Maryland
- (United States) Vincent Ocampo – Loyola Marymount
- (United States) Jason Herrick – Maryland
- (United States) Drew Yates – Maryland
- (United States) Rubin Bega – Michigan State
- (United States) Heath Melugin – Missouri State
- (United States) Lance Rozeboom – New Mexico
- (United States) Billy Schuler – North Carolina
- (United States) Kirk Urso – North Carolina
- (Trinidad and Tobago) Akil DeFreitas – North Carolina State
- (United States) Piero Bellizzi – Northwestern
- (United States) Jeb Brovsky – Notre Dame
- (Nigeria) Bright Dike – Notre Dame
- (United States) John Schaefer – Notre Dame
- (United States) Brian Forgue – Penn State
- (United States) Drew Chrostek – Portland
- (United States) Ryan Luke – Portland
- (United States) Max Alvarez – Sacramento State
- (United States) Bryan Baker – Sacramento State
- (United States) Scott Crandall – Sacramento State
- (United States) Michael Roach – Saint Louis
- (United States) Adam Jahn – Stanford
- (United States) Daniel Leon – Stanford
- (United States) Adoni Levine – Stanford
- (United States) Dominique Yahyavi – Stanford
- (Norway) Fredrik Brustad – Stetson
- (Venezuela) Bernardo Añor – South Florida
- (Haiti) Sébastien Thurière – South Florida
- (United States) Blaine Gonsalves – Tulsa
- (Scotland) Ashley McInnes – Tulsa
- (United States) Jose Parada – Tulsa
- (United States) Chandler Hoffman – UCLA
- (United States) Ryan Hollingshead – UCLA
- (United States) Fernando Monge – UCLA
- (United States) Kyle Nakazawa – UCLA
- (United States) Shawn Guderian – UNC Wilmington
- (United States) Daniel Roberts – UNC Wilmington
- (United States) Neil Barlow – Virginia
- (United States) Ari Dimas – Virginia
- (United States) Jordan Evans – Virginia
- (United States) Hunter Jumper – Virginia
- (United States) Brian Ownby – Virginia
- (United States) Anthony Arena – Wake Forest
- (United States) Corben Bone – Wake Forest
- (United States) Andy Lubahn – Wake Forest
- (United States) Sam Redmond – Wake Forest
- (United States) Husref Jopic – Western Illinois
- (Somalia) Said Abdi – Winthrop
- (Canada) Cameron Alksnis – Winthrop

== See also ==
- NCAA men's soccer tournament (disambiguation)
