= 1989 Virginia Cavaliers men's soccer team =

American college soccer season

1989 Virginia Cavaliers men's soccer

ACC regular season and Tournament Champions

NCAA Tournament Final, T 1–1 v. Santa Clara
- Conference: Atlantic Coast Conference
- Record: 21–2–2 (5–1–0 ACC)
- Head coach: Bruce Arena (12th season)
- Assistant coach: George Gelnovatch (1st season)
- Home stadium: UVA Soccer Field

The 1989 Virginia Cavaliers men's soccer team represented the University of Virginia during the 1989 NCAA Division I men's soccer season. The Cavaliers, playing their 49th season of existence, won their first ever national championship, which was a co-title with Santa Clara. It was often considered the start to the Cavaliers' early 1990s dynasty run in college soccer.

== Schedule ==
Date Time, TV	Rank^{#}	Opponent^{#}	Result	Record	Site City, State
Regular Season
09-02-1989*	No. 1	No. 2 Indiana; Hoosier Soccer Tournament	W 1–0	1–0–0	Bill Armstrong Stadium
09-03-1989*	No. 1	vs. Notre Dame; Hoosier Soccer Tournament	W 3–0	2–0–0	Bill Armstrong Stadium
09-05-1989*	No. 1	Longwood	W 3–1	3–0–0	UVA Soccer Field
09-08-1989*	No. 1	Charlotte; UVA Tournament	W 2–0	4–0–0	UVA Soccer Field
09-10-1989*	No. 1	Charleston; UVA Tournament	W 6–0	5–0–0	UVA Soccer Field
09-13-1989*	No. 1	at VCU	W 10–0	6–0–0	Cary Street Field
09-17-1989	No. 1	at Maryland; Rivalry	W 4–1	7–0–0 (1–0–0)	UMD Soccer Field
09-20-1989*	No. 1	Penn	W 2–0	8–0–0	UVA Soccer Field
09-24-1989	No. 1	No. 13 Wake Forest	W 1–0	9–0–0 (2–0–0)	UVA Soccer Field
09-27-1989*	No. 1	at James Madison	W 2–1 ^{OT}	10–0–0	JMU Soccer Field
10-01-1989	No. 1	No. 11 North Carolina	W 3–0	11–0–0 (3–0–0)	UVA Soccer Field
10-04-1989*	No. 1	at Richmond	L 0–1	11–1–0	University of Richmond Stadium
10-08-1989	No. 1	at NC State	W 4–0	12–1–0 (4–0–0)	Derr Field
10-11-1989*	No. 1	Towson State	W 4–0	13–1–0	UVA Soccer Field
10-14-1989*	No. 1	vs. No. 23 San Francisco; Stanford Tournament	W 1–0	14–1–0	Maloney Field
10-15-1989*	No. 1	at Stanford; Stanford Tournament	W 2–1 ^{OT}	15–1–0	Maloney Field
10-18-1989*	No. 1	George Mason	W 1–0	16–1–0	UVA Soccer Field
10-21-1989	No. 1	at No. 16 Duke	T 2–2 ^{OT}	16–1–1 (4–0–1)	Koskinen Stadium
10-25-1989	No. 1	Virginia Tech; Commonwealth Cup	W 3–1 ^{OT}	17–1–1 (4–0–1)	UVA Soccer Field
10-29-1989	No. 1	No. 18 Clemson	W 4–2 ^{OT}	18–1–1 (5–0–1)	UVA Soccer Field
ACC Tournament
11-10-1989	No. 1	No. 14 Duke; Semifinals	L 0–1	18–2–1	UVA Soccer Field
NCAA Tournament
11-19-1989*	No. 2	No. 13 Philadelphia Textile; Second round	W 4–1	19–2–1	UVA Soccer Field
11-26-1989	No. 2	No. 4 South Carolina; Quarterfinals	W 1–0 ^{OT}	20–2–1	UVA Soccer Field
12-02-1989	No. 2	No. 7 Rutgers; Semifinals	W 3–0	21–2–1	Rutgers Stadium
12-03-1989	No. 2	No. 1 Santa Clara; Final	T 1–1 ^{OT}	21–2–2	Rutgers Stadium (3,889)
*Non-conference game. ^{#}Rankings from United Soccer Coaches. (#) Tournament seedings in parentheses.
