= 2014 Fordham Rams men's soccer team =

American college soccer season

The 2014 Fordham Rams men's soccer team represented the Fordham University during the 2014 NCAA Division I men's soccer season.

== Roster ==
As of July 13, 2014

Note: Flags indicate national team as defined under FIFA eligibility rules; some limited exceptions apply. Players may hold more than one non-FIFA nationality.

| No. | Pos. | Nation | Player |
|---|---|---|---|
| 4 | DF | IRL | Andrew Hickey |
| 5 | DF | USA | Ryan Cupolo |
| 9 | FW | USA | Tommy Granot |
| 14 | FW | CAN | Jon Agostino |
| 15 | MF | USA | T. J. Hughes |
| 16 | MF | USA | Kyle Bitterman |
| 17 | DF | USA | Eric Walano |

| No. | Pos. | Nation | Player |
|---|---|---|---|
| 20 | MF | USA | Greg McNamara |
| 21 | FW | USA | Ryan Walsh |
| 23 | MF | USA | Mike McNamara |
| 24 | MF | ENG | Ollie Kelly |
| 26 | GK | USA | Sean Brailey |
| 27 | GK | ITA | Antonio Salluzzi |
| 29 | DF | ITA | Alessandro Lazzaro |

== Competitions ==
=== Preseason ===
| August 16 | Villanova Wildcats | v | Fordham Rams | Villanova, Pennsylvania |
| 10:00 am EDT | | | | Stadium: Villanova Soccer Complex |

| August 19 | Stony Brook Seawolves | v | Fordham Rams | Stony Brook, New York |
| 5:00 pm EDT | | | | Stadium: LaValle Stadium |

| August 23 | Fordham Rams | v | Vermont Catamounts | The Bronx, New York |
| 2:00 pm EDT | | | | Stadium: Coffey Field |

=== Regular season ===
==== A10 Table ====
| Team | Conference | | | | | | | | Overall | | | | | | |
| Team | Pld | W | L | T | GF | GA | GD | Pts | Pld | W | L | T | GF | GA | GD |
|---|---|---|---|---|---|---|---|---|---|---|---|---|---|---|---|
| Rhode Island | 4 | 4 | 0 | 0 | 0 | 0 | 0 | 12 | 14 | 8 | 3 | 3 | 12 | 12 | 0 |
| Saint Louis | 5 | 3 | 1 | 1 | 0 | 0 | 0 | 10 | 14 | 10 | 3 | 1 | 13 | 6 | +7 |
| Dayton | 4 | 2 | 1 | 1 | 0 | 0 | 0 | 7 | 13 | 6 | 4 | 3 | 13 | 5 | +8 |
| George Mason | 5 | 2 | 2 | 1 | 0 | 0 | 0 | 7 | 15 | 9 | 3 | 3 | 20 | 1 | +19 |
| Fordham | 5 | 2 | 2 | 1 | 0 | 0 | 0 | 7 | 14 | 5 | 7 | 2 | 7 | 10 | -3 |
| VCU | 4 | 1 | 0 | 3 | 0 | 0 | 0 | 6 | 15 | 4 | 7 | 4 | 10 | 10 | 0 |
| Davidson | 3 | 1 | 1 | 1 | 0 | 0 | 0 | 4 | 11 | 7 | 1 | 3 | 14 | 7 | +7 |
| Saint Joseph's | 3 | 1 | 1 | 1 | 0 | 0 | 0 | 4 | 13 | 6 | 3 | 4 | 13 | 6 | +7 |
| George Washington | 3 | 1 | 1 | 1 | 0 | 0 | 0 | 4 | 12 | 5 | 6 | 1 | 9 | 12 | -3 |
| Duquesne | 2 | 1 | 1 | 0 | 0 | 0 | 0 | 3 | 13 | 4 | 7 | 2 | 19 | 11 | +8 |
| La Salle | 3 | 0 | 2 | 1 | 0 | 0 | 0 | 1 | 13 | 4 | 7 | 2 | 8 | 11 | -3 |
| UMass | 4 | 0 | 3 | 1 | 0 | 0 | 0 | 1 | 13 | 1 | 11 | 1 | 6 | 19 | -13 |
| St. Bonaventure | 3 | 0 | 3 | 0 | 0 | 0 | 0 | 0 | 10 | 1 | 9 | 0 | 2 | 13 | -11 |

==== Results ====
| August 29 | Boston University Terriers | 1–0 | Fordham Rams | Boston, Massachusetts |
| 7:00 pm EDT | | | | Stadium: Nickerson Field |

| August 31 | Boston College Eagles | 2–0 | Fordham Rams | Chestnut Hill, Massachusetts |
| 2:00 pm EDT | | | | Stadium: Newton Soccer Complex |

| September 5 | Fordham Rams | 2–1 | Lafayette Leopards | The Bronx, New York |
| 7:00 pm EDT | | | | Stadium: Coffey Field |

| September 9 | Fordham Rams | 3–1 | Manhattan Jaspers | The Bronx, New York |
| 7:00 pm EDT | | | | Stadium: Coffey Field |

| September 13 | NJIT Highlanders | 1–1 (a.e.t.) | Fordham Rams | Newark, New Jersey |
| 7:00 pm EDT | | | | Stadium: Lubetkin Field |

| September 17 | Fordham Rams | 1–0 (a.e.t.) | Temple Owls | The Bronx, New York |
| 4:00 pm EDT | | | | Stadium: Coffey Field |

| September 24 | Columbia Lions | 2–0 | Fordham Rams | Manhattan, New York |
| 7:00 pm EDT | | | | Stadium: Burnham Field |

| September 27 | Dartmouth Big Green | 2–0 | Fordham Rams | Hanover, New Hampshire |
| 3:00 pm EDT | | | | Stadium: Commisso Stadium |

| September 30 | St. John's Red Storm | 1–0 | Fordham Rams | Lawrenceville, New Jersey |
| 7:00 pm EDT | | | | Stadium: Commisso Stadium |

| October 5 | Fordham Rams | 0–1 | Rhode Island Rams | The Bronx, New York |
| 1:00 pm EDT | | | | Stadium: Coffey Field |

| October 10 | La Salle Explorers | 1–3 | Fordham Rams | Philadelphia, Pennsylvania |
| 7:00 pm ET | | | | Stadium: McCarthy Stadium |

| October 12 | Fordham Rams | 2–0 | Saint Joseph's Hawks | The Bronx, New York |
| 1:00 pm EDT | | | | Stadium: Coffey Field |

| October 17 | VCU Rams | 0–0 (a.e.t.) | Fordham Rams | Richmond, Virginia |
| 5:00 pm ET | | | | Stadium: Sports Backers Stadium |

| October 19 | #24 George Mason Patriots | 1–0 | Fordham Rams | Fairfax, Virginia |
| 1:00 pm ET | | | | Stadium: George Mason Stadium |

| October 26 | Fordham Rams | 0–2 | UMass Minutemen | The Bronx, New York |
| 12:00 pm EDT | | | | Stadium: Coffey Field |

| November 2 | Dayton Flyers | 1–2 | Fordham Rams | Dayton, Ohio |
| 2:30 pm EST | | | | Stadium: Baujan Field |

| November 7 | Fordham Rams | 1–1 (a.e.t.) | Duquesne Dukes | The Bronx, New York |
| 7:00 pm EST | | | | Stadium: Coffey Field |

=== A-10 Tournament ===
| November 13 Quarter-finals | VCU Rams | 0–0 (a.e.t.) (3–5 p) | Fordham Rams | Richmond, Virginia |
| 20:00 ET | | Report | | Stadium: Sports Backers Stadium; Attendance: 693; Referee: Bill Dittmar |
| | Penalties |
| | Castillo (penalty scored); Fisher (penalty scored); Herrera-Meraz (penalty missed); Manel (penalty scored) | | (penalty scored) Penfold; (penalty scored) Mastilović; (penalty scored) Kelly; (penalty scored) Loebe; (penalty scored) Cupolo |

| November 14 Semi-finals | #12 Saint Louis Billikens | 1–2 | Fordham Rams | Richmond, Virginia |
| 19:30 ET | Graydon 81' | Report | Cupolo 29'; Loebe 77' | Stadium: Sports Backers Stadium; Referee: Cory Richardson |

| November 16 Final | Rhode Island Rams | 0–1 | Fordham Rams | Richmond, Virginia |
| 13:00 ET | | Report | Loebe 46' | Stadium: Sports Backers Stadium; Attendance: 83; Referee: John McCloskey |

=== NCAA Tournament ===
| November 20, 2014 First round | Dartmouth | 2–1 | Fordham | Hanover, New Hampshire |
| 5:00 EST | Alnas 61'; Adelabu 86' | Report | Bazzini 79' | Stadium: Burnham Field; Attendance: 1,057 |
