= 1973 Saint Louis Billikens men's soccer team =

American college soccer season

1973 Saint Louis Billikens men's soccer

National Champions

NCAA Tournament
- Conference: Independent
- Record: 15–2–3
- Head coach: Harry Keough (7th season)

The 1973 Saint Louis Billikens men's soccer team represented Saint Louis University during the 1973 NCAA Division I men's soccer season. The Billikens won their record-breaking tenth NCAA title this season. It was the sixteenth ever season the Billikens fielded a men's varsity soccer team. As of 2023, this was the most recent season the Billikens have won a national title.

== Schedule ==
Date Time, TV	Rank^{#}	Opponent^{#}	Result	Record	Site City, State
Regular season
09-08-1973*		UMSL	T 3–3	0–0–1	Forest Park Soccer Field; St. Louis, MO
09-13-1973*		at Springfield	W 2–0	1–0–1	Fairview Park; Springfield, IL
09-15-1973*		vs. Penn	W 2–0	2–0–1	Connecticut Soccer Stadium; Storrs, CT
09-17-1973*		at Connecticut	W 2–1	3–0–1	Connecticut Soccer Stadium; Storrs, CT
09-20-1973*		Uruguay national team	L 1–2	3–1–1	Forest Park Soccer Field; St. Louis, MO
09-22-1973*		vs. Davis & Elkins; Quincy Tournament	W 2–0	4–1–1	Reservoir Park; Quincy, IL
09-23-1973*		vs. West Virginia; Quincy Tournament	W 4–1	5–1–1	Reservoir Park; Quincy, IL
09-29-1973*		Quincy	W 5–2	6–1–1	Forest Park Soccer Field; St. Louis, MO
10-06-1973*		at Green Bay	L 0–1	6–2–1	Aldo Santaga Stadium; Green Bay, WI
10-08-1973*		at Cleveland State	T 1–1	6–2–2	Viking Field; Cleveland, OH
10-13-1973*		Rockhurst	W 2–1	7–2–2	Forest Park Soccer Field; St. Louis, MO
10-27-1973*		at South Florida	W 2–1	8–2–2	USF Soccer Field; Tampa, FL
10-29-1973*		at Rollins	W 3–1	9–2–2	Rollins College Soccer Field; Winter Haven, FL
11-03-1973*		SIU Edwardsville; Bronze Boot	W 1–0	10–2–2	Busch Memorial Stadium (20,112); St. Louis, MO
11-17-1973*		at UIC	T 0–0	10–2–3	Flames Field; Chicago, IL
11-19-1973*		American	W 1–0	11–2–3	Forest Park Soccer Field; St. Louis, MO
NCAA Tournament
11-24-1973*		vs. Bowling Green; Second Round	W 6–0	12–2–3	Busch Stadium; St. Louis, MO
12-09-1973*		vs. SIU Edwardsville; Third Round	W 3–0	13–2–3	Busch Stadium; St. Louis, MO
01-02-1974*		vs. Brown; Semifinal	W 3–1	14–2–3	Orange Bowl; Miami, FL
01-04-1974*		vs. UCLA; Final	W 2–1	15–2–3	Orange Bowl; Miami, FL
*Non-conference game. ^{#}Rankings from United Soccer Coaches. (#) Tournament seedings in parentheses.

== Bibliography ==
- Results
