= Joe Hamm =

American soccer player

Personal information
- Full name: Joseph Patrick Hamm
- Date of birth: November 1, 1950 (age 75)
- Place of birth: St. Louis, Missouri, United States
- Height: 5 ft 11 in (1.80 m)
- Position: Midfielder

Youth career
- Years: Team
- 1969–1972: St. Louis University

Joe Hamm (born November 1, 1950, in St. Louis, Missouri) is a former U.S. soccer player who was a member of the U.S. soccer team at the 1972 Summer Olympics.

== College ==
Hamm began as a forward in high school. He moved into the midfielder while playing for the St. Louis University Billikens from 1969 to 1972. Hamm and his teammates won the 1969, 1970 and 1972 NCAA Men's Soccer Championship. He was inducted into the St. Louis University Athletic Hall of Fame in 1995.

== 1972 Summer Olympics ==
Hamm joined the U.S. Olympic soccer team as it went through its qualification campaign for the 1972 Summer Olympics. On April 16, 1972, he scored a goal in the 3–2 loss to Guatemala. Despite the loss, the U.S. ultimately qualified for the games. At the Olympics, the U.S. went 0-2-1 in group play and did not qualify for the second round. Hamm did not play the first U.S. game, a tie, but came on for Buzz Demling in a 3–0 loss to Malaysia on August 29, 1972. He then started and played the entire game in 7–0 loss to host West Germany.

He was inducted into the St. Louis Soccer Hall of Fame on November 1, 2001.
