= 2009 Saint Louis Billikens men's soccer team =

American college soccer season

The 2009 Saint Louis Billikens men's soccer team represented Saint Louis University during the 2009 NCAA Division I men's soccer season.

== Schedule ==
Date	Time	Team	Location	Result	Record	Conference Record
September 1, 2009	7:00PM	New Mexico	Hermann Stadium	L 3-0	0-1
September 4, 2009	6:30PM	Washington	Portland, OR	W 2-1	1-1
September 6, 2009		Portland	Portland, OR	L 3-1	1-2
September 12, 2009		Loyola-Chicago	Toyota Park	W 3-1	2-2
September 18, 2009		Florida International		W 1-0	3-2
September 20, 2009	1:30PM	Akron	Akron, OH	L 4-0	3-3
September 26, 2009	7:30PM	vs Tulsa	Hermann Stadium	L 4-3 (2OT)	3-4
September 30, 2009	7:00PM	vs UMKC	Hermann Stadium	W 3-2	4-4
October 3, 2009	7:00PM	vs Clemson	Hermann Stadium	W 1-0 (OT)	5-4
October 9, 2009	7:00PM	vs Richmond	Hermann Stadium	W 1-0	6-4	1-0
October 11, 2009	1:00PM	vs George Washington	Hermann Stadium	W 4-1	7-4-0	2-0-0
October 17, 2009	7:00PM	vs Charlotte	Hermann Stadium	L 2-1	7-5-0	2-1-0
October 23, 2009	7:00PM	vs Fordham	Hermann Stadium	W 4-1	8-5-0	3-1-0
October 25, 2009	1:00PM	vs La Salle	Hermann Stadium	W 1-0	9-5-0	4-1-0
October 30, 2009	6:00PM	at Xavier	Cincinnati, OH	W 2-1	10-5-0	5-1-0
November 1, 2009	12:00PM	at Dayton	Dayton, OH	L 1-0	10-6-0	5-2-0
November 6, 2009	1:00PM	at Temple	Philadelphia, PA	W 1-0	11-6-0	6-2-0
November 8, 2009	12:00PM	at St. Joseph's	Philadelphia, PA	W 3-0	12-6-0	7-2-0
	A-10 Championship
November 12, 2009		BYE
November 13, 2009		vs. Rhode Island	Kingston, RI	W 3-2
November 15, 2009		vs. Dayton	Kingston, RI	W 2-0	Champions
	NCAA Men's Soccer Tournament
November 19, 2009		vs. Missouri State	Hermann Stadium	W 2-1
November 22, 2009	2:00PM	at Tulsa	Tulsa, OK	L 4-3
