= 1986 Duke Blue Devils men's soccer team =

American college soccer season

1986 Duke Blue Devils men's soccer

MetLife Classic winners NCAA Tournament

College Cup National champions
- Conference: Atlantic Coast Conference
- U. Soc. Coaches poll: No. 1
- Record: 18–5–1 (3–3–0 ACC)
- Head coach: John Rennie (8th season)

1986 ACC men's soccer standings
	Conf.					Overall
Team	W		L		T	W		L		T
No. 10 Virginia‡	6	–	0	–	0	17	–	2	–	2
No. 8 NC State+	4	–	1	–	1	13	–	4	–	2
Clemson	3	–	3	–	0	12	–	6	–	2
No. 22 NC State+	3	–	3	–	0	14	–	4	–	1
No. 1 Duke+	3	–	3	–	0	18	–	5	–	1
North Carolina	1	–	4	–	1	13	–	7	–	1
Wake Forest	0	–	6	–	0	7	–	11	–	2
‡ – ACC champion + – Also invited to the 1986 NCAA tournament; As of December 12, 1986; Rankings from United Soccer Coaches; Source: The ACC

The 1986 Duke Blue Devils men's soccer team represented Duke University during the 1986 NCAA Division I men's soccer season.

The Blue Devils won the first ever national title this season.

== Background ==
In the 1985 season, Duke's soccer team had a successful record of 4-2 in the ACC and 16-5 overall. However, they faced the loss of four-year starters Tom Kain and goalkeeper Pat Johnston to graduation. Head coach John Rennie, with a strong returning midfield and defense, looked to seniors John Kerr, Jr., Kelly Weadock, and Mike Linenberger to step up. Rennie also recruited a strong incoming class, including freshman Joey Valenti from Tampa, Florida, who would later assist in a game-winning goal against Akron.

== Review ==
The early season results were mixed, with losses to Catawba, NC State, and Maryland, but victories over North Carolina and Wake Forest. Duke ended the regular season 15-5-1, including a 4-0 loss to Virginia. Despite some close losses, Duke registered eleven shutouts and five matches with a win margin of at least four goals.

In the first round of the NCAA tournament, Duke faced 13th-ranked South Carolina, winning 3-2 with all goals scored in the first half. In the second round, they defeated 12th-ranked NC State 2-0 with goals from freshmen Brian Benedict and Joey Valenti. In the quarterfinals, Duke played Loyola of Baltimore, winning 2-1 and ending Loyola's 30-game winning streak.

Duke then faced Ivy League Champion Harvard, winning 3-1 with two early goals by Kerr. The national championship game was held on December 13 in the Tacoma Dome against 12th-ranked Akron Zips. Duke won 1-0 with a goal by Tom Stone, assisted by Joey Valenti and Carl Williamson. Starting goalkeeper Mark Dodd made three saves for his ninth shutout of the season.

Following the championship, John Kerr was awarded the 1986 Hermann Trophy and the National Player of the Year Award by the Missouri Athletic Club. Teammates Stone and Weadock were named most valuable offensive and defensive players of the national championship game, respectively. Freshman Robert Probst was named to the 1986 Men's All-Freshman Team by Soccer America. Undefeated at home (12-0-1), the team returned to Duke with their first national championship trophy in any sport, greeted by the cheers of the campus community and Duke President Keith Brodie.

== Schedule ==
Date	Opponent	Rank	Stadium (City)	Result F–A	Scorers	Attendance	Record (Conference)
Wolfpack Classic
September 6	vs. Catawba*		Method Road; Raleigh, NC	1–2	Kerr Jr.	169	0–1–0
September 7	vs. Vanderbilt*		Method Road	6–0	Unknown	374	1–1–0
MetLife Classic
September 12	UConn*		Koskinen Stadium; Durham, NC	5–0	Unknown	Unknown	2–1–0
September 14	Hartwick*		Koskinen Stadium	5–0	Unknown	Unknown	3–1–0
September 17	Davidson*		Koskinen Stadium	6–0	Unknown	Unknown	4–1–0
September 20	at NC State		Method Road	3–4	Unknown	Unknown	4–2–0 (0–1–0)
September 23	Drexel*		Koskinen Stadium	5–1	Unknown	Unknown	5–2–0
September 28	Clemson		Koskinen Stadium	5–2	Unknown	Unknown	6–2–0 (1–1–0)
October 1	Charlotte*		Koskinen Stadium	2–0	Unknown	Unknown	7–2–0
October 4	at Maryland		Byrd Stadium; College Park, MD	0–1	Unknown	Unknown	7–3–0 (1–2–0)
October 8	at UNCG*		UNCG Stadium; Greensboro, NC	3–0	Unknown	Unknown	8–3–0
October 12	George Mason*		Koskinen Stadium	1–1^{OT}	Unknown	Unknown	8–3–1
October 15	Charleston (WV)*		Koskinen Stadium	1–0	Unknown	Unknown	9–3–1
October 19	at South Carolina*		Stone Stadium; Columbia, SC	3–2^{OT}	Unknown	Unknown	10–3–1
October 22	Wake Forest		Koskinen Stadium	2–1	Unknown	Unknown	11–3–1 (2–2–0)
October 26	Virginia		Scott Stadium; Charlottesville, VA	0–4	Unknown	Unknown	11–4–1 (2–3–0)
UCLA Classic
November 1	vs. Cal State Fullerton*		Elvin Drake Stadium; Los Angeles, CA	1–0	Unknown	Unknown	12–4–1
November 2	vs. UCLA*		Elvin Drake Stadium	0–3	Unknown	Unknown	12–5–1
November 9	North Carolina		Koskinen Stadium	1–0	Unknown	Unknown	13–5–1 (3–3–0)
NCAA tournament
November 16	No. 13 South Carolina; First round	No. 10	Koskinen Stadium	3–2	Unknown	Unknown	14–5–1
November 23	at No. 17 NC State; Round of 16	No. 10	Method Road	2–0	Unknown	Unknown	15–5–1
November 30	at No. 25 Loyola (MD); Quarterfinals	No. 10	Koskinen Stadium	2–1	Unknown	Unknown	16–5–1
December 7	Harvard; Semifinals	No. 10	Koskinen Stadium	3–1	Unknown	Unknown	17–5–1
December 13	vs. No. 12 Akron; National championship	No. 10	Tacoma Dome; Tacoma, WA	1–0	Stone	4,652	18–5–1

Legend: = Win = Loss = Tie

== Awards and honors ==
- John Kerr
  - ACC Men's Soccer Player of the Year
  - All-ACC First-Team
  - Hermann Trophy
  - ISAA Player of the Year
  - MAC Player of the Year
  - NSCAA First-Team All-American
  - NSCAA First-Team All-South Region
  - NSCAA Player of the Year
  - Soccer America First-Team All-American
  - Soccer America Player of the Year Award
- Tom Stone
  - All-ACC Second-Team
  - NSCAA Third-Team All-South Region
- Kelly Weadock
  - All-ACC Second-Team
  - NSCAA First-Team All-South Region
