= Gene Geimer =

American soccer player (born 1949)

Personal information
- Date of birth: January 31, 1949 (age 77)
- Place of birth: St. Louis, Missouri
- Position: Forward

Youth career
- 1967–1969: Saint Louis University

Senior career*
Years	Team	Apps	(Gls)
1966–1971	St. Louis Kutis		
1971–1975	St. Louis Stars	65	(17)
1973	→ Dover (loan)	?	(0)
1976	Boston Minutemen	10	(2)
1976–1977	Chicago Sting	22	(6)
1978–1979	Indianapolis Daredevils		
1978–1979	Cincinnati Kids (indoor)	15	(15)

International career
1972–1973	United States	6	(2)
- * Club domestic league appearances and goals

Gene Geimer is a former U.S. soccer forward who spent seven seasons in the North American Soccer League and at least one season in Major Indoor Soccer League. Before entering the professional ranks, Geimer won a National Amateur Cup with St. Louis Kutis in 1971. He also earned six caps, scoring two goals, with the United States in 1972 and 1973.

== Youth and college ==
Geimer grew up in St. Louis and attended Saint Louis University where he played both soccer and baseball. He was a two-year letterman on the baseball team in 1969 and 1970, but gained his greatest fame on the soccer field. He was a member of the Saint Louis Billikens soccer team from 1967 to 1969, starting the last two years. In 1967 and then again in 1969, the Billikens took the NCAA Men's Soccer Championship. In 2004, St. Louis University inducted Geimer into the school's Hall of Fame.

== St. Louis Kutis ==
Beginning at 17 before and after playing for Saint Louis University, Geimer played with St. Louis Kutis of the St. Louis Municipal Leagues. In 1967, Kutis made it to the National Amateur Cup Final. In 1971, Kutis won the National Amateur Cup title.

== NASL ==
In 1971, the St. Louis Stars of the North American Soccer League (NASL) drafted Geimer. He played with the Stars for five seasons. In 1972 the Stars went to the NASL championship only to fall to the New York Cosmos. However, to get there, the Stars defeated the Rochester Lancers 2–0 in the semi-finals with one goal coming from Geimer. Geimer's most productive season came in 1973 when he finished fourth on the NASL scoring list with ten goals and five assists. At the end of the 1975 season, the Stars traded Geimer to the Boston Minutemen. He began the 1976 season with the Boston Minutemen, but was traded to the Chicago Sting after ten games. He finished the 1976 season, then spent the 1977 season with the Sting.

== MISL ==
In 1978, Geimer joined the Cincinnati Kids for the first season of a new indoor soccer league, the Major Indoor Soccer League (MISL). He set a regular-season record with seven goals in a game, a record later broken by Steve Zungul.

== National team ==
Geimer earned his first cap with the U.S. national team in an August 20, 1972 loss to Canada. He scored in his second game with the national team nine days later when the U.S. tied Canada 2–2 on goals from Geimer and Willy Roy. Geimer played two more games that year, scoring again in a 2–1 loss to Mexico on September 10. His last game with the national team came in an October 16, 1973 loss to Mexico.
