= 1969 NCAA soccer tournament =

1969 College Cup

Tournament details
- Country: United States
- Venue(s): Spartan Stadium; San Jose, California
- Teams: 24

Final positions
- Champions: Saint Louis (7th title)
- Runners-up: San Francisco
- Semifinalists: Harvard; Maryland

Tournament statistics
- Matches played: 23
- Goals scored: 79 (3.43 per match)

Awards
- Best player: Al Trost, Saint Louis (offensive); Pat Leahy, Saint Louis (defensive)

The 1969 NCAA soccer tournament was the 11th annual tournament organized by the National Collegiate Athletic Association to determine the national champion of men's college soccer among its members in the United States.

The final match was played at Spartan Stadium in San Jose, California on December 8.

Saint Louis won a seventh national title, defeating San Francisco in the championship game, 4–0.

== Qualifying ==
Ten teams made their debut appearances in the NCAA soccer tournament: Cleveland State, Montclair State, Penn, Philadelphia Textile (Jefferson), RPI, San Diego State, SIU Edwardsville, South Florida, Southern Connecticut State, and Virginia.

== Bracket ==
First round
Harvard	5
Southern Connecticut	0
Brown	2
Bridgeport	1
Hartwick	5
RPI	3
NYU	1
Adelphi	0
Maryland	5
Virginia	0
South Florida	1
Navy	0
Philadelphia Textile	2
West Chester State	1
Montclair State	0
Penn	3

Second round
Harvard	4
Brown	0
Hartwick	4
NYU	3
Saint Louis	4
SIU Edwardsville	0
Cleveland State	3
Michigan State	0
San Francisco	2
San Diego State	1
San Jose State	1
Air Force	0
Maryland	4
South Florida	1
Philadelphia Textile	1
Penn	2

Quarterfinals
Harvard	1
Hartwick	0
Saint Louis	2
Cleveland State	1
San Francisco	3
San Jose State	1
Maryland	1
Penn	0

Semifinals
Harvard	1
Saint Louis	2
San Francisco	1
Maryland	0

Championship; San Jose, CA
Saint Louis	4
San Francisco	0

== Final ==
December 8, 1969

Saint Louis	4–0	San Francisco

Spartan Stadium, San Jose, California
Attendance: 5,000

== See also ==
- 1969 NAIA Soccer Championship
