= 1972 NCAA University Division soccer tournament =

Men's college soccer tournament in the United States

1972 College Cup

Tournament details
- Country: United States
- Venue(s): Miami Orange Bowl; Miami, Florida
- Teams: 24

Final positions
- Champions: Saint Louis (9th title)
- Runner-up: UCLA
- Semifinalists: Cornell; Howard

Tournament statistics
- Matches played: 23
- Goals scored: 90 (3.91 per match)

Awards
- Best player: Danny Counce, Saint Louis (offensive); Bruce Arena, Cornell (defensive)

The 1972 NCAA University Division soccer tournament was the 14th annual tournament organized by the National Collegiate Athletic Association to determine the national champion of men's college soccer among its University Division members in the United States.

The final match was played at the Miami Orange Bowl in Miami, Florida on December 29.

Saint Louis won their ninth national title by defeating UCLA in the championship game, 4–2. The championship was not re-awarded.

A concurrent NCAA College Division Men's Soccer Championship (now known as Division II) was held for the first time in 1972.

== Qualifying ==
Six teams made their debut appearances in the NCAA soccer tournament: Bowling Green, Clemson, Duke, Fresno State, Rhode Island, and Washington.

== Bracket ==
First round
Harvard	1
Rhode Island	0
Brown	4
Connecticut	2
Long Island	2
NYU	1
Army	1
Cornell	3
Howard	9
Duke	0
Clemson	3
West Virginia	2
Penn	4
Drexel	0
Penn State	2
Saint Joseph's	0

Second round
Harvard	3
Brown	2
Long Island	2
Cornell	3
San Jose State	4
Fresno State	0
UCLA	5
Washington	0
Howard	4
Clemson	0
Penn	3
Penn State	1
Saint Louis	2
Bowling Green	0
Ohio	3
Air Force	2

Quarterfinals
Harvard	0
Cornell	2
San Jose State	1
UCLA	3
Howard	2
Penn	0
Saint Louis	3
Ohio	1

Semifinals
Cornell	0
UCLA	1
Howard	1
Saint Louis (OT)	2

Championship
UCLA	2
Saint Louis	4

== Final ==
December 29, 1972

UCLA	2–4	Saint Louis

Miami Orange Bowl, Miami, Florida
Attendance: 3,000

== See also ==
- 1972 NCAA College Division soccer tournament
- 1972 NAIA Soccer Championship
