= John Pisani =

American soccer player

Personal information
- Date of birth: December 24, 1947 (age 78)
- Place of birth: St. Louis, Missouri, U.S.
- Position: Midfielder

College career
Years	Team	Apps	(Gls)
1967–1969	Saint Louis Billikens		

Senior career*
Years	Team	Apps	(Gls)
1970–1972	St. Louis Stars	34	(2)
1974–1975	St. Louis Stars	15	(1)
- * Club domestic league appearances and goals

John Pisani is an American retired soccer midfielder who played professionally in the North American Soccer League.

Pisani graduated from Christian Brothers College High School. Between 1963 and 1966, he scored 138 goals in 122 games. He then attended St. Louis University where he played on the men's soccer team from 1967 to 1969. He was a member of the 1967 and 1969 NCAA championship teams and is a member of the Billikens Soccer Hall of Fame. In 1999, he was inducted into the St. Louis Soccer Hall of Fame. In 1970, he signed with the St. Louis Stars of the North American Soccer League. He played for them until 1972 and again from 1974 to 1975.
