= 2009 Akron Zips men's soccer team =

American college soccer season

2009 Akron Zips men's soccer

Radisson Tulsa Airport Classic Champions Bearcat Classic Champions

MAC Regular Season Champions MAC Men's Soccer Tournament Champions

NCAA Tournament, National Runner-up
- Conference: Mid-American Conference

Ranking
- Coaches: No. 2
- Record: 23–0–2 (6–0–0 MAC)
- Head coach: Caleb Porter (3rd season)
- Assistant coach: Dave Giffard (3rd season)
- Home stadium: Lee Jackson Field

The 2009 Akron Zips men's soccer team represented the University of Akron during the 2009 NCAA Division I men's soccer season. The Zips finished the season undefeated and won every match of the season except for the national championship game, where they lost in penalties to Virginia.

== Roster ==
Note: Flags indicate national team as defined under FIFA eligibility rules; some limited exceptions apply. Players may hold more than one non-FIFA nationality.

No.	Pos.	Nation	Player
00	GK	(United States) USA	Anthony Ponikvar
2	DF	(Puerto Rico) PUR	Zarek Valentin
3	DF	(United States) USA	Chad Barson
4	MF	(Ghana) GHA	Kofi Sarkodie
6	MF	(Liberia) LBR	Darlington Nagbe
7	MF	(United States) USA	Blair Gavin
8	MF	(United States) USA	C. J. Kauffman
9	MF	(United States) USA	Michael Nanchoff
10	MF	(Thailand) THA	Anthony Ampaipitakwong
11	FW	(Zambia) ZAM	Yoram Mwila
12	FW	(Canada) CAN	Teal Bunbury
13	MF	(United States) USA	Ben Zemanski
14	MF	(United States) USA	Eric Stevenson

No.	Pos.	Nation	Player
15	MF	(United States) USA	Scott Caldwell
16	DF	(United States) USA	Chris Korb
17	MF	(United States) USA	Ben Speas
18	MF	(United States) USA	Ivan Sandoval
19	FW	(Sweden) SWE	Stefan Östergren
20	FW	(United States) USA	Matt Mason
21	FW	(United States) USA	Thomas Schmitt
22	DF	(Venezuela) VEN	Enrique Paez
23	GK	(United States) USA	Andrian McAdams
24	GK	(United States) USA	David Meves
25	DF	(United States) USA	Matt Dagilis
27	MF	(United States) USA	Brandon Silva

== Schedule ==
Date Time, TV	Rank^{#}	Opponent^{#}	Result	Record	Site City, State
Preseason
08-21-2009*	No. 3	No. 11 South Florida	W 3–1		Jackson Field (1,756); Akron, OH
08-29-2009*	No. 3	No. 10 Wisconsin	W 2–1		Jackson Field (2,004); Akron, OH
Regular season
09-04-2009*	No. 3	vs. SMU; Radisson Tulsa Airport Classic	W 1–0	1–0–0	Hurricane Soccer & Track Stadium (177); Tulsa, OK
09-06-2009*	No. 3	at No. 14 Tulsa; Radisson Tulsa Airport Classic	W 1–0	2–0–0	Hurricane Soccer & Track Stadium (1,153); Tulsa, OK
09-11-2009*	No. 1	vs. High Point; Bearcat Classic	W 4–1	3–0–0	Gettler Stadium (83); Cincinnati, OH
09-13-2009*	No. 1	at Cincinnati; Bearcat Classic	W 3–0	4–0–0	Gettler Stadium (497); Cincinnati, OH
09-18-2009*	No. 1	No. 8 Indiana	W 1–0	5–0–0	Jackson Field (2,443); Akron, OH
09-20-2009*	No. 1	Saint Louis	W 4–0	6–0–0	Jackson Field (1,150); Akron, OH
09-26-2009	No. 1	Bowling Green	W 6–0	7–0–0 (1–0–0)	Jackson Field (647); Akron, OH
09-30-2009*	No. 1	No. 15 Ohio State	W 3–0	8–0–0	Jackson Field (2,473); Akron, OH
10-03-2009	No. 1	at Florida Atlantic	W 3–0	9–0–0 (2–0–0)	FAU Soccer Stadium (353); Boca Raton, FL
10-07-2009*	No. 1	at UIC	W 3–1	10–0–0	Flames Field (962); Chicago, IL
10-10-2009	No. 1	at Western Michigan	W 4–0	10–0–0 (3–0–0)	WMU Soccer Complex (278); Kalamazoo, MI
10-13-2009*	No. 1	at Virginia Tech	W 2–0	11–0–0	Thompson Field (653); Blacksburg, VA
10-17-2009	No. 1	Northern Illinois	W 1–0	12–0–0 (4–0–0)	Jackson Field (1,273); Akron, OH
10-20-2009*	No. 1	at Michigan	W 5–1	13–0–0	U-M Soccer Stadium (671); Ann Arbor, MI
10-23-2009	No. 1	at Buffalo	W 1–0	14–0–0 (5–0–0)	UB Stadium (977); Buffalo, NY
10-28-2009*	No. 1	Penn State	W 3–0	15–0–0	Jackson Field (1,563); Akron, OH
11-04-2009*	No. 1	Michigan State	W 2–1	16–0–0	Jackson Field (1,644); Akron, OH
11-07-2009	No. 1	Hartwick	W 3–2	17–0–0 (6–0–0)	Jackson Field (2,439); Akron, OH
MAC Tournament
11-13-2009	(1) No. 1	(4) Northern Illinois; Semifinals	W 1–0 ^{2OT}	18–0–0	Jackson Field (2,237); Akron, OH
11-15-2009	(1) No. 1	(2) Hartwick; MAC Championship	W 2–1	19–0–0	Jackson Field (2,439); Akron, OH
NCAA Tournament
11-22-2009*	(1) No. 1	South Florida; Second round	W 2–0	20–0–0	Jackson Field (2,700); Akron, OH
11-29-2009*	(1) No. 1	No. 17 Stanford; Third round	W 2–0	21–0–0	Jackson Field (2,806); Akron, OH
12-05-2009*	(1) No. 1	(8) No. 8 Tulsa; Quarterfinals	W 1–0	22–0–0	Jackson Field (4,254); Akron, OH
12-11-2009*	(1) No. 1	(5) No. 5 North Carolina; National Semifinal	T 0–0; W 5–4 pen. ^{2OT}	22–0–1	WakeMed Soccer Park (8,862); Cary, NC
12-13-2009*	(1) No. 1	(2) No. 2 Virginia; National Championship	T 0–0; L 2–3 pen. ^{2OT}	22–0–2	WakeMed Soccer Park (5,679); Cary, NC
*Non-conference game. ^{#}Rankings from United Soccer Coaches. (#) Tournament seedings in parentheses.
