= 1965 Saint Louis Billikens men's soccer team =

U.S. soccer team

1965 Saint Louis Billikens men's soccer
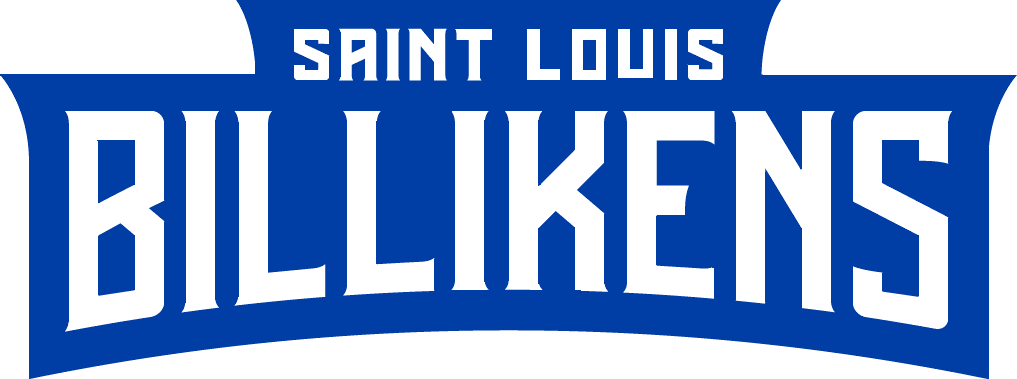

National Champions

NCAA Tournament, W 1–0 vs. Michigan State
- Conference: Independent
- Record: 14–0
- Head coach: Bob Guelker (8th season)

The 1965 Saint Louis Billikens men's soccer team represented Saint Louis University during the 1965 NCAA soccer season. The Billikens won their fifth NCAA title this season. It was the eighth ever season the Billikens fielded a men's varsity soccer team.

== Schedule ==
Date Time, TV	Rank^{#}	Opponent^{#}	Result	Record	Site City, State
Regular season
09-25-1965*		at Illinois	W 6–0	1–0	Champaign, IL
10-02-1965*		at Wheaton	W 1–0	2–0	Wheaton, IL
10-03-1965*		at Northwestern	W 4–0	3–0	Evanston, IL
10-09-1965*		at Notre Dame	W 10–0	4–0	South Bend, IN
10-16-1965*		Air Force	W 4–0	5–0	St. Louis, MO
10-23-1965*		at Miami (FL)	W 6–2	6–0	Miami, FL
10-30-1965*		SLU Alumni; Alumni Game	W 6–1	7–0	St. Louis, MO
11-06-1965*		at Michigan State	W 3–2	8–0	East Lansing, MI
11-10-1965*		MacMurray	W 5–1	9–0	St. Louis, MO
11-13-1965*		Marquette	W 10–0	10–0	St. Louis, MO
NCAA Tournament
11-20-1965*		Ohio; First Round	W 2–1	11–0	St. Louis, MO
11-27-1965*		at San Francisco; Quarterfinals	W 5–2	12–0	San Francisco, CA
12-02-1965*		Navy; Semifinals	W 3–1	13–0	St. Louis, MO
12-04-1965*		Michigan State; Final	W 1–0	14–0	St. Louis, MO
*Non-conference game. ^{#}Rankings from United Soccer Coaches. (#) Tournament seedings in parentheses.
