= 2014 Saint Louis Billikens men's soccer team =

American college soccer season

The 2014 Saint Louis Billikens men's soccer team represented Saint Louis University during the 2014 NCAA Division I men's soccer season. It is the university's 56th season fielding a varsity soccer team, and the team's 28th season playing in the Atlantic 10 Conference.

== Competitions ==
=== Preseason ===
| August 16 | Saint Louis Billikens | 0–0 | Notre Dame Fighting Irish | St. Louis, Missouri |
| 7:00 pm CT | | | | Stadium: Hermann Stadium |

| August 20 | UIC Flames | 3–2 | Saint Louis Billikens | Chicago, Illinois |
| 7:00 pm CT | | | | Stadium: Flames Field |

| August 23 | Saint Louis Billikens | 3–0 | Jefferson College Vikings | St. Louis, Missouri |
| 7:00 pm CT | | | | Stadium: Hermann Stadium |

=== Regular season ===
==== A10 Standings ====
| Team | Conference | | | | | | | | Overall | | | | | | |
| Team | Pld | W | L | T | GF | GA | GD | Pts | Pld | W | L | T | GF | GA | GD |
|---|---|---|---|---|---|---|---|---|---|---|---|---|---|---|---|
| Rhode Island | 4 | 4 | 0 | 0 | 0 | 0 | 0 | 12 | 14 | 8 | 3 | 3 | 12 | 12 | 0 |
| Saint Louis | 5 | 3 | 1 | 1 | 0 | 0 | 0 | 10 | 14 | 10 | 3 | 1 | 13 | 6 | +7 |
| Dayton | 4 | 2 | 1 | 1 | 0 | 0 | 0 | 7 | 13 | 6 | 4 | 3 | 13 | 5 | +8 |
| George Mason | 5 | 2 | 2 | 1 | 0 | 0 | 0 | 7 | 15 | 9 | 3 | 3 | 20 | 1 | +19 |
| Fordham | 5 | 2 | 2 | 1 | 0 | 0 | 0 | 7 | 14 | 5 | 7 | 2 | 7 | 10 | -3 |
| VCU | 4 | 1 | 0 | 3 | 0 | 0 | 0 | 6 | 15 | 4 | 7 | 4 | 10 | 10 | 0 |
| Davidson | 3 | 1 | 1 | 1 | 0 | 0 | 0 | 4 | 11 | 7 | 1 | 3 | 14 | 7 | +7 |
| Saint Joseph's | 3 | 1 | 1 | 1 | 0 | 0 | 0 | 4 | 13 | 6 | 3 | 4 | 13 | 6 | +7 |
| George Washington | 3 | 1 | 1 | 1 | 0 | 0 | 0 | 4 | 12 | 5 | 6 | 1 | 9 | 12 | -3 |
| Duquesne | 2 | 1 | 1 | 0 | 0 | 0 | 0 | 3 | 13 | 4 | 7 | 2 | 19 | 11 | +8 |
| La Salle | 3 | 0 | 2 | 1 | 0 | 0 | 0 | 1 | 13 | 4 | 7 | 2 | 8 | 11 | -3 |
| UMass | 4 | 0 | 3 | 1 | 0 | 0 | 0 | 1 | 13 | 1 | 11 | 1 | 6 | 19 | -13 |
| St. Bonaventure | 3 | 0 | 3 | 0 | 0 | 0 | 0 | 0 | 10 | 1 | 9 | 0 | 2 | 13 | -11 |

==== Match results ====
| August 29 | Saint Louis Billikens | 1–0 | Tulsa Golden Hurricane | St. Louis, Missouri |
| 7:00 pm CT | | | | Stadium: Hermann Stadium |

| August 31 | Saint Louis Billikens | 3–1 | Virginia Tech Hokies | St. Louis, Missouri |
| 7:00 pm CT | | | | Stadium: Hermann Stadium |

| September 6 | Memphis Tigers | v | #15 Saint Louis Billikens | Memphis, Tennessee |
| 7:00 pm CT | | | | Stadium: Mike Rose Soccer Complex |

| September 9 | #15 Saint Louis Billikens | v | #2 Louisville Cardinals | St. Louis, Missouri |
| 7:00 pm CT | | | | Stadium: Hermann Stadium |

| September 13 | Saint Louis Billikens | v | Evansville Purple Aces | St. Louis, Missouri |
| 7:00 pm CT | | | | Stadium: Hermann Stadium |

| September 16 | Saint Louis Billikens | v | UMKC Kangaroos | St. Louis, Missouri |
| 7:00 pm CT | | | | Stadium: Hermann Stadium |

| September 20 | Creighton Bluejays | v | Saint Louis Billikens | Omaha, Nebraska |
| 6:00 pm CT | | | | Stadium: Morrison Stadium |

| September 27 | Saint Louis Billikens | v | Central Arkansas Bears | St. Louis, Missouri |
| 7:30 pm CT | | | | Stadium: Hermann Stadium |

| October 1 | Indiana Hoosiers | v | Saint Louis Billikens | Bloomington, Indiana |
| 6:30 pm CT | | | | Stadium: Bill Armstrong Stadium |

| October 5 | Saint Louis Billikens | v | St. Bonaventure Bonnies | St. Louis, Missouri |
| 1:00 pm CT | | | | Stadium: Hermann Stadium |

| October 10 | Davidson Wildcats | v | Saint Louis Billikens | Davidson, North Carolina |
| 6:00 pm CT | | | | Stadium: Alumni Soccer Stadium |

| October 12 | George Mason Patriots | v | Saint Louis Billikens | Fairfax, Virginia |
| 12:00 pm CT | | | | Stadium: George Mason Stadium |

| October 17 | Saint Louis Billikens | v | Duquesne Dukes | St. Louis, Missouri |
| 8:00 pm CT | | | | Stadium: Hermann Stadium |

| October 19 | Saint Louis Billikens | v | UMass Minutemen | St. Louis, Missouri |
| 2:00 pm CT | | | | Stadium: Hermann Stadium |

| October 25 | Dayton Flyers | v | Saint Louis Billikens | Dayton, Ohio |
| 7:00 pm CT | | | | Stadium: Baujan Field |

| November 2 | Saint Louis Billikens | v | Rhode Island Rams | St. Louis, Missouri |
| 7:00 pm CT | | | | Stadium: Hermann Stadium |

| November 7 | VCU Rams | v | Saint Louis Billikens | Richmond, Virginia |
| 6:00 pm CT | | | | Stadium: Sports Backers Stadium |
