= Jonathan Villanueva =

American soccer player

Personal information
- Full name: Jonathan Villanueva Quintanilla
- Date of birth: March 30, 1988 (age 38)
- Place of birth: Dallas, Texas, United States
- Height: 5 ft 10 in (1.78 m)
- Position: Midfielder

Team information
- Current team: Richmond Kickers
- Number: 21

Youth career
- 2003–2006: Dallas Texans
- 2006–2009: Virginia Cavaliers

Senior career*
Years	Team	Apps	(Gls)
2010	Richmond Kickers	12	(2)
- * Club domestic league appearances and goals as of September 20, 2010

Jonathan Villanueva (born March 30, 1988, in Dallas, Texas) is an American former soccer player who last played for Richmond Kickers in the USL Second Division.

== Career ==
=== Youth and college ===
Villanueva grew up in Grand Prairie, Texas, and attended South Grand Prairie High School, where he was a three-time NSCAA All-American, an adidas ESP Invitee and adidas All-Star, was named to the Parade All-America team as the top midfielder in the country as a senior, and was rated as the nation's top soccer recruit by School Sports Magazine.

He subsequently played four years of college soccer at the University of Virginia, being named to the ACC All-Freshman Team following his debut season in 2006, to the ACC All-Tournament team as a junior in 2008, and being named the Most Outstanding Offensive Player after leading UVA to the 2009 NCAA College Cup.

=== Professional ===
Surprisingly un-drafted out of college, Villanueva turned professional in 2010 when he signed with the Richmond Kickers of the USL Second Division. He made his professional debut on April 24, 2010, in a league match against the Charlotte Eagles, and scored his first professional goal on May 21, 2010, also in a game against Charlotte. At the end of the 2010 season, Villaneuva's contract was not renewed.

== Personal life ==
After leaving professional soccer, Villaneuva became a courier for Express Packages from 2010 until 2014. Since 2014, he has been a real estate agent for Keller Williams Realty, and resides in his native, Dallas.
