= Harry Keough =

American soccer player (1927–2012)

Personal information
- Full name: Harry Joseph Keough
- Date of birth: November 15, 1927
- Place of birth: St. Louis, Missouri, U.S.
- Date of death: February 7, 2012 (aged 84)
- Height: 5 ft 9 in (1.75 m)
- Position: Defender

Youth career
- 1945–1946: St. Louis Schumachers

Senior career*
Years	Team	Apps	(Gls)
1946	San Francisco Barbarians		
1948–1949	Paul Schulte Motors		
1949–1950	→ St. Louis McMahon		
1950–1952	→ St. Louis Raiders		
1953–1961	→ St. Louis Kutis		

International career
1949–1957	United States	19	(1)

Managerial career
- Florissant Valley Community College
- 1967–1982: St. Louis University
- * Club domestic league appearances and goals

Harry Joseph Keough (November 15, 1927 – February 7, 2012) was an American soccer defender who played on the United States national team in their 1–0 upset of England at the 1950 FIFA World Cup. He spent most of his club career in his native St. Louis, winning a national junior championship, two National Challenge Cup and seven National Amateur Cup titles. He coached the Saint Louis University men's soccer team to five NCAA Men's Soccer Championships. The Keough Award, named after him, his brother Bill, and his son Ty Keough, is presented each year to the outstanding St. Louis–based male and female professional or college soccer player.

== Playing ==
=== Club career ===
Keough was born to Patrick John and Elizabeth (née Costley) Keough, and grew up in St. Louis, Missouri, attending Cleveland High School. As a youth he played several sports, including track, swimming, and fast-pitch softball, particularly excelling at soccer. His soccer career began in 1945 as a member of the "St. Louis Schumachers", who won the 1946 National Junior Challenge Cup. In 1946, he joined the U.S. Navy. He was assigned to a naval base in San Francisco, California where he played for the "San Francisco Barbarians", which had dominated west coast soccer in the first half of the 20th century. Keough was eventually sent to San Diego as part of a destroyer crew. After his discharge from the Navy, Keough returned to St. Louis.

In 1948, he played for Paul Schulte Motors. The next year the team came under the sponsorship of McMahon Pontiac and which played in the lower division St. Louis Municipal League. He was with McMahon when selected for the U.S. national team as it entered qualification for the 1950 World Cup. When he returned home from the cup, Keough rejoined his team, now known as the St. Louis Raiders of the first division St. Louis Major League. The Raiders won both the league and National Amateur Cup championships in 1952, giving Keough his first “double”. Following the 1952 season, Tom Kutis took over sponsorship of the team, renaming it St. Louis Kutis S.C. The team continued its winning ways under its new name, winning the 1953 and 1954 league titles, and went to the 1954 National Challenge Cup final where it fell to New York Americans of the American Soccer League. The St. Louis Major League had folded in 1954 and Kutis continued to play both as an independent team and as a member of various lower division city leagues over the next decade. Despite this turbulence, it continued to dominate both the city and national soccer scene. Kutis would win the National Amateur Cup each year from 1956 to 1961. In 1957, it won the National Challenge Cup, giving Keough another double.

=== National and Olympic teams ===
In 1949, Keough was called into the national team for the 1949 NAFC Championship, to be held in Mexico. This was the second time the NAFC had held a regional championship, but this one served as the qualification tournament for the World Cup as well. Keough gained his first cap with the national team in its 1–1 tie with Cuba on September 14, 1949. The U.S. finished second out of the three teams, giving it a spot in the cup for the first time since 1937. At the World Cup, Keough served as team captain for the game against Spain "because he spoke Spanish." He also made appearances for the U.S. team in the 1952 and 1956 Summer Olympics, as well as the qualifying matches for the 1954 FIFA World Cup and 1958 FIFA World Cups. His last game with the national team was a 3-2 World Cup qualification loss to Canada on July 6, 1957.

== Coaching ==
Upon his retirement as a player, he became coach of Florissant Valley Community College. In 1967, St. Louis University hired him away from Florissant. In his first year with the Billikens, Keough took his team to an NCAA co-championship. He then took his team to four additional championships during his tenure (1969, 1970, 1972, and 1973). When he retired from coaching in 1982, he had compiled a 213-50-23 record with SLU. After retiring from his collegiate coaching career at SLU, Harry served as head coach of the boys' soccer team at Block Yeshiva High School in University City and served as the assistant coach of the women's soccer team at Washington University.

The Keough Award, named for Harry Keough, his brother Bill and his son, Ty, is now presented each year to the outstanding St. Louis–based male and female professional or college soccer player.

== Recognition ==
Keough was inducted into the St. Louis Soccer Hall of Fame in 1972, the National Soccer Hall of Fame in 1976 (along with his 1950 U.S. teammates), the St. Louis University Athletic Hall of Fame in 1995, and the NSCAA Hall of Fame in 1996. In January 2004, Keough and the four other living members of the 1950 World Cup Team (Walter Bahr, Frank Borghi, Gino Pariani and John Souza) were recognized as Honorary All-Americans by the NSCAA at its annual convention in Charlotte, North Carolina. In 1994, the book "The Game of Their Lives", was published, covering the 1950 U.S. World Cup Team's 1 - 0 victory in Belo Horizonte, Brazil, versus the highly favored English team, and in 2005 the movie was released (on DVD under the name "Miracle Match"). Keough was named as one of the 50 Greatest Athletes of the Century (for Missouri) by Sports Illustrated. On September 30, 2009, Keough was named to SLU's Half-Century Team, and on November 18, 2009, Keough was inducted into the St. Louis Sports Hall of Fame as a member of its inaugural class.

== Personal ==
During his playing career, Keough worked for the U.S. Postal Service. Keough's son Ty Keough was also a professional soccer player who played for the U.S. team and was a sports commentator for soccer broadcasts. His father Patrick appeared on the famous TV program The $64,000 Question in the mid-1950s where he won an automobile for answering questions about baseball. Keough suffered from Alzheimer's disease in his later life. Harry Keough died on February 7, 2012.

== Documentary ==
Keough was featured in the 2009 soccer documentary A Time for Champions discussing the U.S. upset victory over England in the 1950 World Cup and his coaching career at St. Louis University.
