= 1990 UCLA Bruins men's soccer team =

American college soccer season

1990 UCLA Bruins men's soccer

UNLV Tournament champions UCLA Classic champions

NCAA Tournament, Champions
- Conference: Independent
- Record: 19–1–4
- Head coach: Sigi Schmid (11th season)

The 1990 UCLA Bruins men's soccer team represented the University of California, Los Angeles during the 1990 NCAA Division I men's soccer season. UCLA was coached by then-11th year head coach, Sigi Schmid.

The season is hallmarked by the Bruins winning their second NCAA national championship, and their first since the 1985 team. UCLA finished the season with a 19–1–4 record. UCLA and Rutgers played for the National Championship. In a scoreless draw, the Bruins won 4–3 on a penalties.

== Background ==
The previous season saw the Bruins finish with a 18–4–1 overall record, competing as an independent. The Bruins earned an at-large bid into the 1989 NCAA Division I Men's Soccer Tournament, where they reached the quarterfinals, before losing to eventual national co-champions, Santa Clara.

== Team ==
=== Roster ===
Source: Note: Flags indicate national team as defined under FIFA eligibility rules; some limited exceptions apply. Players may hold more than one non-FIFA nationality.

No.	Pos.	Nation	Player
1	GK	USA	Brad Friedel
2	MF	USA	Cobi Jones
3	MF	USA	Billy Thompson
4	DF	USA	Dan Beaney
5	DF	USA	Jorge Salcedo
6	DF	USA	Mike Lapper
7	FW	USA	Tim Gallegos
8	FW	USA	Joe-Max Moore
9	FW	USA	Mike Sharp
10	FW	MEX	Rey Fenandez
11	DF	USA	Dana Keir
12	MF	USA	Sam George

No.	Pos.	Nation	Player
13	MF	USA	Sean Henderson
14	MF	USA	Chris Henderson
15	FW	ENG	Paul Ratcliffe
16	DF	USA	Ty Miller
17	DF	USA	Zak Ibsen
18	DF	USA	Tayt Ianni
19	FW	USA	Kirk Ferguson
21	MF	MEX	Arturo Yepez
22	MF	USA	Eric Page
23	GK	USA	Isaac Adamson
24	FW	USA	Matt Arya
31	GK	USA	Nat Gonzalez

== Competitions ==
=== Regular season ===
August 28 1	UC Irvine	1–3	UCLA	Los Angeles, CA
				Stadium: Drake Stadium

September 1 2 (UNLV Tournament)	UCLA	3–0	Indiana	Las Vegas, NV
				Stadium: Johann Memorial Field

September 2 3 (UNLV Tournament)	Old Dominion	0–3	UCLA	Las Vegas, NV
				Stadium: Johann Memorial Field

September 5 4	UCLA	3–3 (a.e.t.)	San Diego	San Diego, CA
				Stadium: Torero Stadium

September 9 5	Cal State Dominguez Hills	1–5	UCLA	Los Angeles, CA
				Stadium: Drake Stadium

September 12 6	Westmont	1–4	UCLA	Los Angeles, CA
				Stadium: Drake Stadium

September 16 7	Saint Mary's (CA)	0–1 (a.e.t.)	UCLA	Los Angeles, CA
				Stadium: Drake Stadium

September 19 8	UCLA	1–1 (a.e.t.)	Santa Clara	Santa Clara, CA
				Stadium: Stevens Stadium

September 23 9	San Francisco	0–0 (a.e.t.)	UCLA	Los Angeles, CA
				Stadium: Drake Stadium

September 28 10	UCLA	1–0	California	Berkeley, CA
				Stadium: Edwards Stadium

September 30 11	UCLA	2–1 (a.e.t.)	Stanford	Stanford, CA
				Stadium: Maloney Field

October 7 12	UNLV	1–2	UCLA	Los Angeles, CA
				Stadium: Drake Stadium

October 9 13	USC	0–7	UCLA	Los Angeles, CA
				Stadium: Drake Stadium

October 13 14 (Rutgers Invitational)	UCLA	2–1 (a.e.t.)	Princeton	Piscataway, NJ
				Stadium: Yurcak Field

October 14 15 (Rutgers Invitational)	UCLA	1–2	Rutgers	Piscataway, NJ
				Stadium: Yurcak Field

October 19 16 (UCLA Classic)	Air Force	0–3	UCLA	Los Angeles, CA
				Stadium: Drake Stadium

October 21 17 (UCLA Classic)	Wake Forest	0–2 (a.e.t.)	UCLA	Los Angeles, CA
				Stadium: Drake Stadium

October 30 18	Loyola Marymount	1–9	UCLA	Los Angeles, CA
				Stadium: Drake Stadium

November 4 19	San Diego State	1–1 (a.e.t.)	UCLA	Los Angeles, CA
				Stadium: Drake Stadium

=== NCAA Tournament ===
November 18 Second round	San Diego	1–2 (a.e.t.)	UCLA	Los Angeles, CA
				Stadium: Drake Stadium

November 25 Quarterfinals	SMU	0–2	UCLA	Los Angeles, CA
				Stadium: Drake Stadium

December 1 Semifinals	UCLA	1–0 (a.e.t.)	North Carolina	Tampa, FL
				Stadium: USF Track and Field Stadium

December 2 Final	Rutgers	0–0 (a.e.t.) (3–4 p)	UCLA	Tampa, FL
				Stadium: USF Track and Field Stadium
	Penalties
			(penalty scored) (penalty scored) (penalty scored); Salcedo (penalty scored)
