= 2002 UCLA Bruins men's soccer team =

American college soccer season

2002 UCLA Bruins men's soccer

National Champions

Pac-10 Champions Titan Invitational Champions

NCAA Tournament, W 1–0 vs. Stanford
- Conference: Pac-10 Conference
- Record: 18–3–3 (8–2–0 Pac-10)
- Head coach: Tom Fitzgerald (1st season)

2002 Pacific-10 Conference men's soccer standings
	Conf.					Overall
Team	W		L		T	W		L		T
No. 1 UCLA ‡	8	–	2	–	0	18	–	3	–	3
No. 15 California +	6	–	3	–	1	14	–	6	–	2
No. 2 Stanford +	5	–	3	–	2	17	–	4	–	3
Oregon State	4	–	6	–	0	13	–	8	–	0
Washington	3	–	7	–	0	6	–	10	–	3
Fresno State	2	–	7	–	1	5	–	11	–	4
‡-Conference champion + - Invited to the 2002 NCAA Division I Men's Soccer Championship; Rankings from NSCAA

The 2002 UCLA Bruins men's soccer team represented the University of California, Los Angeles during the 2002 NCAA Division I men's soccer season. The Bruins won their fourth NCAA title this season, defeating Pac-10 rivals, Stanford, in the championship. To date, this is UCLA's most recent College Cup title. It was the 66th season the Bruins fielded a men's varsity soccer team, and their 11th season playing in the Pacific-10 Conference (now the Pac-12).

== Background ==
The 2001 UCLA team was coached by Todd Saldana, who finished the 2001 season with a 12-7-4 overall record. Saldana was forced to resign by the university after it was discovered that he had yet to complete his undergraduate degree. Fitzgerald, a former coach of Major League Soccer's Columbus Crew was hired to coach the program in February 2002.

== Roster ==
Note: Flags indicate national team as defined under FIFA eligibility rules; some limited exceptions apply. Players may hold more than one non-FIFA nationality.

No.	Pos.	Nation	Player
1	GK	USA	Zach Wells
2	FW	USA	Tim Pierce
3	MF	USA	Ryan Futagaki
4	DF	USA	Jordan Harvey
5	DF	MEX	Aaron López
7	FW	USA	Ty Maurin
8	MF	USA	Chadd Davis
9	FW	USA	Matt Taylor
10	MF	USA	Jimmy Frazelle
11	MF	USA	Adolfo Gregorio
12	DF	USA	Leonard Griffin
13		USA	Chapin Kreuter

No.	Pos.	Nation	Player
14	MF	USA	Mike Enfield
15	DF	USA	Ahmed Khalil
16	DF	USA	Luke Mehring
17	DF	USA	Scot Thompson
18	MF	USA	Nate Pena
19		USA	Ryan Valdez
20	MF	USA	Phillip Harr
21	FW	USA	Evan Corey
23	MF	USA	Tony Lawson
25		USA	Dru Hoshimiya
27	GK	USA	John Carson
28		USA	Kurt Schmid

== Schedule ==
Numbers in superscript text represent the team's NSCAA ranking.

=== Exhibitions ===
August 24, 2002	Saint Louis ^{No. 11}	2–2	^{No. 13} UCLA	Saint Louis
7:30 p.m.	Jewsbury 29', 31'; Hopson (yellow card) 45'; McKee (yellow card) 60'	Report	Frazelle (yellow card) 48'; Pierce 78', 90'; Walls (yellow card) 88'	Stadium: Hermann Stadium; Attendance: 4,548; Referee: David Harris

=== Regular season ===
August 30, 2002 1	UCLA ^{No. 13}	4–1	Boston University	Fullerton, CA
	Futagaki 23' (yellow card) 45'; Gregorio 70', 79'; Lopez 73'; Pierce 76'	Report	Johnson 60'	Stadium: Titan Stadium; Attendance: 874; Referee: Cameron Fattahi

September 1, 2002 2	FIU	0–1 (a.e.t.)	^{No. 13} UCLA	Fullerton, CA
	Asorey (yellow card) 10'; Boswell (yellow card) 57'	Report	Futagaki (yellow card) 46'; Pierce (yellow card) 73'; Frazelle 100'	Stadium: Titan Stadium; Attendance: 619; Referee: Heros Baghoumian

September 6, 2002 3	Cal State Fullerton	1–3	^{No. 8} UCLA	Fullerton, CA
	Dischner (yellow card) 4'; Reynolds (yellow card) 30'; Orellana 48'; Mihata (yellow card) 50'; Catinas (yellow card) 51'	Report	Futagaki 22'; Taylor 31'; Harvey (yellow card) 45'; Frazelle 66'	Stadium: Titan Stadium; Attendance: 1,392; Referee: Spiros Bagoumian

September 15, 2002 4	UCLA ^{No. 8}	3–1	^{No. 21} San Diego	Los Angeles, CA
	Gregorio 23' (yellow card) 43'; Pierce 60'; Taylor 63'	Report	Wunderle 55'; Reeves (yellow card) 69'	Stadium: Drake Stadium; Attendance: 790; Referee: Heros Baghoumian

September 22, 2002 5	Loyola Marymount ^{No. 17}	2–0	^{No. 3} UCLA	Los Angeles, CA

September 29, 2002 6	UCLA ^{No. 14}	7–0	San Diego State	Los Angeles, CA
	Pierce 1', 55', 61'; Taylor 29', 70'; Futagaki 74'; McKinley 80'	Report		Stadium: Drake Stadium; Attendance: 497; Referee: Levon Baladjanian

October 4, 2002 7	Rutgers ^{No. 13}	1–1 (a.e.t.)	^{No. 17} UCLA	Piscataway, NJ
	Gros 88'	Report	Pierce 60'	Stadium: Yurcak Field; Attendance: 3,048; Referee: Doug Drabik

October 6, 2002 8	St. John's ^{No. 6}	0–0 (a.e.t.)	^{No. 17} UCLA	Piscataway, NJ
		Report	Enfield (yellow card) 35'; Lopez (yellow card) 62'; Gregorio (yellow card) 73'	Stadium: Yurcak Field; Attendance: Not reported Referee: Alex Ivanhenko

October 13, 2002 9	UCLA ^{No. 16}	2–1	Fresno State	Los Angeles, CA
	Harvey (yellow card) 13'; Gregorio (yellow card) 41'; Mehring 51'; Frazelle 82'	Report	LeRoy 38'; Moran (yellow card) 51'	Stadium: Drake Stadium; Attendance: 2,104; Referee: Vince Cortes

October 18, 2002 10	UCLA ^{No. 16}	1–0 (a.e.t.)	^{No. 1} Stanford	Los Angeles, CA
	Mehring (yellow card) 21'; Thompson (yellow card) 68'; Frazelle 92'	Report	Twellman (yellow card) 23'	Stadium: Drake Stadium; Attendance: 1,243; Referee: Reggie Rutty

October 20, 2002 11	UCLA ^{No. 10}	2–1	California	Los Angeles, CA
	Lopez 21'; Taylor 44'; Griffin (yellow card) 51'; Frazelle (yellow card) 55'	Report	Acosta 40'	Stadium: Drake Stadium; Attendance: 602; Referee: Levon Baladjanian

October 25, 2002 12	Oregon State	0–3	^{No. 5} UCLA	Corvallis, OR
	Gordon (yellow card) 54'	Report	Pierce 44', 52'; McKinley 74'	Attendance: 441; Referee: Bobby Martinez

October 27, 2002 13	Washington	0–1	^{No. 5} UCLA	Seattle, WA
	Birklid (yellow card) 23'	Report	Griffin (yellow card) 30'; Mehring 39'	Stadium: Husky Soccer Stadium; Attendance: 2,116; Referee: Brian Hall

November 1, 2002 14	UCLA ^{No. 2}	1–2 (a.e.t.)	Washington	Los Angeles, CA
	McKinley 62'	Report	Wiesner 24'; Hobbs (yellow card) 79'; Klaas 108'	Stadium: Drake Stadium; Attendance: 435; Referee: Richard Heron

November 3, 2002 15	UCLA ^{No. 2}	2–0	Oregon State	Los Angeles, CA
	Gregorio 4'; Taylor 66'	Report		Stadium: Drake Stadium; Attendance: 2,064; Referee: Scott Weyland

November 8, 2002 16	California ^{No. 9}	1–0 (a.e.t.)	^{No. 5} UCLA	Berkeley, CA
	Carr (yellow card) 66'; Hickman 102'	Report	Lawson (yellow card) 29'; Fitzgerald (yellow card) 29' (yellow-red card) 102'; Hoshimiya (yellow card) 40'; Corey (yellow card) 95'; Pierce (yellow card) 102'	Stadium: Edwards Stadium; Attendance: 235; Referee: Des O'Sullivan

November 10, 2002 17	Stanford ^{No. 19}	0–1	^{No. 5} UCLA	Stanford, CA
	Janusz (yellow card) 7'; Graham (yellow card) 32'	Report	Gregorio (yellow card) 19'; Thompson (yellow card) 64'; McKinley 77'; Griffin (yellow card) 81'; Hoshimiya (yellow card) 87'	Stadium: Laird Q. Cagan Stadium; Attendance: 1,643; Referee: Simon Ingham

November 14, 2002 18	UCLA ^{No. 9}	1–1 (a.e.t.)	San Francisco	Los Angeles, CA
	Gregorio 49'	Report	Kolovos 19'; Kodani (yellow card) 67'	Stadium: Drake Stadium; Attendance: 628; Referee: Des O'Sullivan

November 17, 2002 19	Fresno State	1–3	^{No. 9} UCLA	Fresno, CA
	Low 50'; Vega (yellow card) 51' (yellow-red card) 73'		Pierce 21', 31'; Davis (yellow card) 27'; Futagaki (yellow card) 58'; Taylor 83'	Stadium: Ratcliffe Stadium; Attendance: 4,313; Referee: Ryan Hall

=== NCAA Tournament ===
No. (#) Rankings from NSCAA Poll. (#) Tournament seedings in parentheses.

November 27, 2002 Second round	UCLA ^{No. 4 (3)}	4–2	^{No. 21} Loyola Marymount	Los Angeles, CA
7:00 p.m.	McKinley 14'; Griffin (yellow card) 36'; Lopez 41'; Gregorio 50', 83'	Report	Novak 18'; Brewer (yellow card) 44'; Kovar 70'	Stadium: Drake Stadium; Attendance: 1,441; Referee: Richard Heron

November 30, 2002 Third round	UCLA ^{No. 4 (3)}	3–2	^{No. 23} California	Los Angeles, CA
7:00 p.m.	Lopez 20'; McKinley 28'; Taylor 51'	Report	Acosta 81', 83'	Stadium: Drake Stadium; Attendance: 1,036; Referee: Des O'Sullivan

December 7, 2002 Quarterfinals	UCLA ^{No. 4 (3)}	7–1	^{No. 15} Penn State	Los Angeles, CA
7:00 p.m. PT	Frazelle (yellow card) 25' (goal) 86'; Gregorio 26' (pen.); Pierce 52', 57' (yellow card) 59'; Taylor 77', 81', 88'	Report	Walters 4'; Sickman (red card) 26'; Treschuk (yellow card) 82'	Stadium: Drake Stadium; Attendance: 1,548; Referee: Richard Heron

==== College Cup ====
December 13, 2002 Semifinals	Maryland ^{No. 2 (2)}	1–2	^{No. 4 (3)} UCLA	Dallas, TX
2:00 p.m. PT	Stammler (yellow card) 43'; Goodson (yellow card) 58'; Ibrahim 81'	Report	Thompson (yellow card) 26'; Futagaki (yellow card) 59'; Taylor 75'; Gregorio 82'	Stadium: Gerald J. Ford Stadium; Attendance: 7,025; Referee: Bob Martinez

December 15, 2002 Final	UCLA ^{No. 4 (3)}	1–0	^{No. 12} Stanford	Dallas, TX
11:00 a.m. PT	Thompson (yellow card) 31'; Lopez 89'	Report	Graham (yellow card) 25'	Stadium: Gerald J. Ford Stadium; Attendance: 8,498; Referee: Brian Hall
