= 1985 UCLA Bruins men's soccer team =

American college soccer season

1985 UCLA Bruins men's soccer

National Champions

NCAA Tournament, W 1–0 (8OT) vs. American
- Conference: Independent
- Record: 20–1–4
- Head coach: Sigi Schmid (6th season)

The 1985 UCLA Bruins men's soccer team represented the University of California, Los Angeles during the 1985 NCAA Division I men's soccer season.

The Bruins won their first ever NCAA championship this year, defeating American, 1–0 after 8 overtime periods. Andy Burke scored the match-winning goal for UCLA in the 167th minute, which to date, is the longest-ever NCAA soccer game.

== Review ==
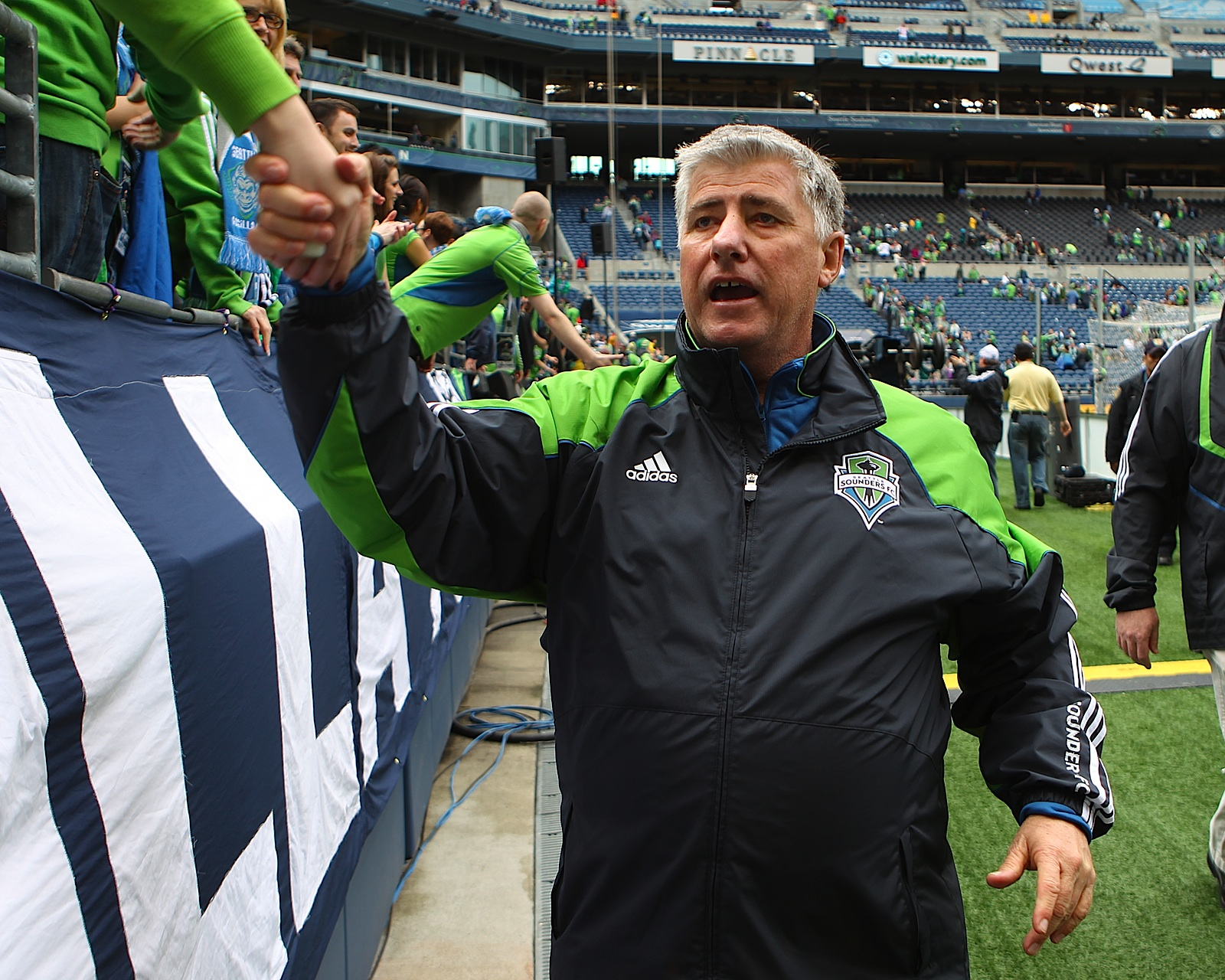
Sigi Schmid coached the Bruins to their first NCAA championship.

The 1985 team is best known as being the first UCLA soccer team to win the NCAA title, winning 1–0 over American University at the now-demolished Kingdome, in Seattle on December 14, 1985. The season saw the Bruins only lose one match the entire season, a 2–1 decision against the Fresno State Bulldogs in Northridge, California on September 25. During the 1985 NCAA Division I Men's Soccer Tournament, the Bruins only conceded one goal, in the semifinals at Evansville on a penalty kick by Chris Machold. The win against Evansville, sent the Bruins to their first NCAA championship match since 1973, ending a 12-year drought in terms of appearances.

The championship match, clocking in at 166 minutes and five seconds, is, by far, the longest NCAA Division I Men's Championship Game match in history. The match involved a record-breaking eight overtimes (this was prior to the penalty kick shoot-out rule that was subsequently implemented). At the time, overtime consisted of five-minute sudden death overtime periods. This caused broken run-of-play. In the 167th minute, Andy Burke, who had hardly played much of the season, came on to the pitch to score the match-winning goal against American, locking UCLA with their first ever NCAA championship. Burke made himself open to receive a through pass from Krumpe and scored on a far-post shot from 13 yards out. The goal was his first ever as a Bruin.

Schmid said on the game: "Andy hadn't played much that year. Before the game, his dad had read an article in the Wall Street Journal that talked about how the last guy, the most unexpected person, is the one who makes the biggest contribution sometimes. He had relayed that message to Andy the day before, and the next day Andy went out and made the biggest contribution. Anytime you win a championship, it obviously takes a special place. This one ranks right up there with all of the other championships. The first one is always a little special, though, because it's the first one. As a player, I played in three Final Fours but never won it, so it was especially satisfying to win it the first time as a coach."

== Schedule ==
Date Time, TV	Rank^{#}	Opponent^{#}	Result	Record	Site City, State
Regular season
September 2*		Westmont	W 3–1	1–0–0	Drake Stadium; Los Angeles, CA
September 6*		vs. Connecticut; IU Tournament	T 1–1 ^{2OT}	1–0–1	Bill Armstrong Stadium; Bloomington, IN
September 7*		at Indiana; IU Tournament	W 1–0	2–0–1	Bill Armstrong Stadium; Bloomington, IN
September 14*		vs. Tampa; FIU Tournament	W 4–2	3–0–1	FIU Soccer Stadium; Miami, FL
September 15*		at FIU; FIU Tournament	T 1–1 ^{2OT}	3–0–2	FIU Soccer Stadium; Miami, FL
September 20*		at San Francisco	W 3–2	4–0–2	Negoesco Stadium; San Francisco, CA
September 25*		vs. Fresno State; CSU Northridge Showcase	L 1–2	4–1–2	Matador Field; Northridge, CA
September 29*		San Jose State	W 5–0	5–1–2	Drake Stadium; Los Angeles, CA
October 5*		California; UCLA Classic	W 3–2	6–1–2	Drake Stadium; Los Angeles, CA
October 6*		Stanford; UCLA Classic	W 3–1	7–1–2	Drake Stadium; Los Angeles, CA
October 9*		UC Santa Barbara; UCSB rivalry	W 1–0	8–1–2	Drake Stadium; Los Angeles, CA
October 14*		at UNLV	T 2–2 ^{2OT}	8–1–3	Johann Field; Las Vegas, NV
October 16*		at U.S. International	T 1–1 ^{2OT}	8–1–4	U.S. International Soccer Field; San Diego, CA
October 18*		at Loyola Marymount	W 5–0	9–1–4	Sullivan Field; Los Angeles, CA
October 23*		San Diego	W 1–0	10–1–4	Drake Stadium; Los Angeles, CA
October 25*		at San Diego State	W 2–1	11–1–4	Hardy Field; San Diego, CA
October 30*		at UC Irvine	W 4–1	12–1–4	Crawford Field; Irvine, CA
November 3*		Cal State Los Angeles	W 3–0	13–1–4	Drake Stadium; Los Angeles, CA
November 6*		Cal State Fullerton	W 1–0	14–1–4	Drake Stadium; Los Angeles, CA
November 10*		Santa Clara	W 1–0	15–1–4	Drake Stadium; Los Angeles, CA
NCAA Tournament
November 17*		California; First Round	W 3–1	16–1–4	Drake Stadium; Los Angeles, CA
November 24*		UNLV; Second Round	W 1–0 ^{OT}	17–1–4	Drake Stadium; Los Angeles, CA
December 1*		SMU; Quarterfinals	W 2–0	18–1–4	Drake Stadium; Los Angeles, CA
December 8*		at Evansville; Semifinals	W 3–1	19–1–4	Arad McCutchan Stadium; Evansville, IN
December 14*		vs. American; National Championship	W 1–0 ^{8OT}	20–1–4	Kingdome (5,986); Seattle, WA
