= Ryan Jorden =

American soccer player and coach (born 1973)

Current position
- Title: Head coach
- Team: UCLA Bruins
- Conference: Big Ten Conference

Biographical details
- Born: April 11, 1973 (age 53); Santa Barbara, California
- Education: Westmont College

Playing career
- 1991–1994: Westmont College

Coaching career (HC unless noted)
- 1996–1999: Oregon State (assistant)
- 2000–2007: Westmont College (assistant)
- 2008–2012: Cal Baptist
- 2014–2018: Pacific
- 2019–: UCLA

Head coaching record
- Overall: 108–82–19 (.562)
- Tournaments: 3–2–1 (.583)

Accomplishments and honors

Awards
- WCC Co-Coach of the Year: 2016

Ryan A. Jorden (born April 11, 1973) is an American soccer coach who currently coaches the UCLA Bruins men's soccer program. Jorden had previously coached the Pacific Tigers and the California Baptist University Lancers programs. Jorden, known for his coaching ability at California Baptist University transferred to UCLA.

== Career ==
=== Playing ===
Ryan Jorden played four seasons of college soccer for Westmont College, from 1991 until 1994. With Westmont, the Warriors made two NAIA appearances.

=== Coaching ===
On April 29, 2019, Jorden was announced as the head coach of the UCLA Bruins men's soccer program. This hiring came following the resignation and indictment of previous head coach Jorge Salcedo for his alleged participation in the 2019 college admissions bribery scandal.

== Coaching record ==
Season	Team	Overall	Conference	Standing	Postseason
Cal Baptist (Pac-West) (2008–2012)
2008	Cal Baptist	7–8–3	3–5–2		
2009	Cal Baptist	5–7–4	4–5–1		
2010	Cal Baptist	15–5–0	8–2–0		
2011	Cal Baptist	17–5–1	10–2–0		
2012	Cal Baptist	16–5–2	10–3–1		
Cal Baptist:		60–30–10 (.650)	35–17–4 (.661)		
Pacific (WCC) (2014–2018)
2014	Pacific	3–15–0	1–6–0	7th	
2015	Pacific	1–15–1	0–6–1	8th	
2016	Pacific	13–4–2	4–1–2	2nd	NCAA Second Round
2017	Pacific	13–4–2	4–2–1	2nd	NCAA Second Round
2018	Pacific	12–5–2	5–2–0	2nd	NCAA Second Round
Pacific:		42–43–7 (.495)	14–17–4 (.457)		
UCLA (Pac-12) (2019–present)
2019	UCLA	6–9–3	2–6–2	5th	
2020	UCLA	3–7–2	2–6–2	5th	
2021	UCLA	11–7–1	5–4–1	3rd	NCAA Second Round
2022	UCLA	12–7–1	4–4–1	4th	NCAA Third Round
2023	UCLA	9–4–5	6–0–4	1st	NCAA First Round
UCLA (Big Ten Conference) (2024–present)
2024	UCLA	7–6–6	3–4–3	6th	NCAA First Round
2025	UCLA	8–6–5	5–3–2	4th	NCAA First Round
UCLA:		56–46–23 (.540)	27–27–15 (.500)		
Total:		158–119–40 (.562)			
National champion Postseason invitational champion Conference regular season champion Conference regular season and conference tournament champion Division regular season champion Division regular season and conference tournament champion Conference tournament champion
