= Isaac Adamson =

American writer

- Born: 1971 (age 54–55); Fort Collins, Colorado, U.S.
- Education: University of Colorado at Boulder
- Spouse: Chee-Soo Kim
- Writing career
- Genre: Mystery

Isaac Adamson (born 1971, Fort Collins, Colorado) is an American author who wrote a series of mystery novels set in Japan and featuring journalist and amateur detective Billy Chaka.

== Biography ==
After graduating from Rocky Mountain High School in Fort Collins, Adamson attended UCLA briefly before graduating from the University of Colorado at Boulder with a degree in Film Studies. While at UCLA, he was a member of the 1990 NCAA National Championship men' soccer team.

Adamson's first novel, Tokyo Suckerpunch, was to be made into a film by Sony Pictures Entertainment, starring Tobey Maguire in the role of Billy Chaka. All four of his Billy Chaka novels were published by HarperCollins. They are currently out of print. His novel Complication was published by Counterpoint Press. Complication, a thriller set in Prague, was a nominee for the Mystery Writers of America's 2013 Edgar Awards in the Best Paperback Original category.

Adamson currently lives in Portland, Oregon. He is married to Chee-Soo Kim.

== Written works ==
- Tokyo Suckerpunch (2000)
- Hokkaido Popsicle (2002)
- Dreaming Pachinko (2003)
- Kinki Lullaby (2004)
- Complication (2012)
- Bubbles (script) (2015)
- 51 Dons (script) (2015)
- The Ice Twins (script) (2016)
- Helios (script) (2016)
- Chippendales (script) (2017)
- Possum Song (script) (2020)
