= Ryan Futagaki =

Retired American soccer and beach soccer player (born 1980)

Personal information
- Full name: Ryan Arnold Futagaki
- Date of birth: January 17, 1980 (age 46)
- Place of birth: Huntington Beach, California, United States
- Height: 5 ft 7 in (1.70 m)
- Positions: Midfielder; defender

Youth career
- 1998–2002: UCLA Bruins

Senior career*
| Years | Team | Apps | (Gls) |
| 2003 | Chicago Fire | 7 | (0) |
| 2004-05 | Chicago Storm | 3 | (1) |
| 2005 | D.C. United (reserves) | 1 | (0) |
| 2005 | Chicago Fire (reserves) | 8 | (0) |

International career^{‡}
| 1999 | United States (U-20) | 1 | (1) |
| 1999 | United States (U-23) | 5 | |
| 2009–2019 | United States (beach) | 58 | (12) |

Managerial career
- 2022–: United States (women's beach, assistant)
- 2024–: United States (men's beach, assistant)
- * Club domestic league appearances and goals as of April 18, 2013 ‡ National team caps and goals as of August 7, 2024

Ryan Arnold Futagaki (born January 17, 1980), is an American former professional soccer player and current beach soccer player. He played as a midfielder for the Chicago Fire in Major League Soccer (MLS) and later transitioned to indoor soccer with the Chicago Storm. Futagaki played for a decade with the United States Beach Soccer National Team, notably becoming the first American to score in both a FIFA U-20 World Cup and a FIFA Beach Soccer World Cup. Outside of soccer, he works in biopharmaceutical sales.

== Early life ==
Ryan Futagaki was born on January 17, 1980, in Huntington Beach, California, and grew up in Fountain Valley, California. He attended Fountain Valley High School, where he played as a midfielder.

Futagaki played youth and high school soccer at Fountain Valley High School under coach Kevin Smith. A four-time All-Sunset League first-team selection, he was twice named All-CIF and was also a Parade All-American in 1997–98. During his junior year he scored 17 goals and 10 assists, earning Sunset League MVP honors, and he captained his club team, Mission Viejo Pateadores, to the National Cup Championship in 1998.

== College career ==
Futagaki enrolled at the University of California, Los Angeles (UCLA), where he played college soccer for the UCLA Bruins under coach Sigi Schmid. As a freshman in 1998, he appeared in all 21 games, earning Rookie of the Year honors. He started 18 of 22 games in 1999, recording three goals and three assists.

He redshirted in 2000 due to a knee injury but returned in 2001 as a team co-captain, earning first-team All-Pac-10 honors with three goals and three assists. In 2002, as co-captain again, he was a finalist for the M.A.C. Hermann Trophy, contributed three goals and four assists, and assisted on the game-winning goal in the NCAA Championship match against Stanford.

== Professional career ==
Futagaki was selected by the Chicago Fire in the sixth round (54th overall) of the 2003 MLS SuperDraft from UCLA. In 2003, Futagaki appeared in six Major League Soccer (MLS) matches for the Chicago Fire and played one match in the U.S. Open Cup. He also played for the Chicago Fire Reserves (8 games) and D.C. United Reserves (1 game) in the MLS Reserve Division in 2005. During the 2004–2005 season, he played indoor soccer with the Chicago Storm in the Major Indoor Soccer League (MISL), recording three appearances with one goal and one assist.

== International career ==
=== United States U20 (1999) ===
Futagaki represented the United States U20 team at the 1999 FIFA World Youth Championship in Nigeria, coached by Sigi Schmid. He originally tried to play for the U-17 team at the FIFA U-17 World Cup, but was not chosen. He scored the lone U.S. goal in a 3–1 group stage loss to Japan, a personal highlight of his career. The U.S. team advanced to the Round of 16, where they were defeated 3–2 by eventual champions Spain. Futagaki also played for the U.S. U23 team at the Pan American Games, earning a bronze medal.

=== United States U23 (1999) ===
Futagaki was on U.S. U23 squad that won bronze at the Pan American Games, earning five U-23 caps.

=== United States Beach Soccer (2009–2019) ===
In 2007, encouraged by UCLA assistant coach Eddie Soto, Futagaki began playing beach soccer, a sport he initially found challenging due to its unique demands on sand. Between 2009 and 2019, Futagaki earned 58 caps and scored 12 goals for the U.S. Men’s Beach Soccer National Team. He played as a defender and participated in six CONCACAF Beach Soccer Championships (2009, 2011, 2013, 2015, 2017, 2019), collecting 31 caps and eight goals in those tournaments.

Futagaki was part of the U.S. squad that won its second regional title in 2013, securing the country’s first FIFA Beach Soccer World Cup berth since 2007. He also helped the team to a runner-up finish at the 2019 CONCACAF Championship, qualifying for the 2019 FIFA Beach Soccer World Cup in Paraguay. He played in all six World Cup matches across the 2013 and 2019 tournaments, scoring once in the 2013 opener against Spain.

== Coaching career ==
Ryan Futagaki currently serves as an assistant coach for both the U.S. Men's and Women's Beach Soccer National Teams under the U.S. Soccer Federation. He joined the Women's program in early 2022 and subsequently stepped into an assistant coaching role with the Men's team as of October 2024.

== Statistics ==
Professional stats

| Competition | Team | Season | GP | GS | MIN | G | A | SH |
|---|---|---|---|---|---|---|---|---|
| MLSr | Chicago Fire (reserves) | 2005 | 8 | 4 | 402 | 0 | | |
| MLSr | D.C. United (reserves) | 2005 | 1 | 1 | 90 | 0 | | |
| MISL2 | Chicago Storm | 2004–2005 | 3 | | | 1 | 1 | 7 |
| USOC | Chicago Fire | 2003 | 1 | | -2 | 0 | | |
| MLS | Chicago Fire | 2003 | 6 | 2 | 218 | 0 | 1 | 3 |

UCLA stats

| Year | GP | GS | Sh | Gl | A | Pts |
|---|---|---|---|---|---|---|
| 2002 | 23 | 15 | 27 | 3 | 4 | 10 |
| 2001 | 22 | 21 | 51 | 3 | 3 | 9 |
| 1999 | 22 | 18 | 35 | 3 | 3 | 9 |
| 1998 | 21 | 12 | 21 | 0 | 1 | 1 |
| Totals | 88 | 66 | 134 | 9 | 11 | 29 |
