= Hugo Salcedo =

Soccer player (born 1946)

Personal information
- Date of birth: January 25, 1946 (age 80)
- Place of birth: Guadalajara, Jalisco, Mexico
- Height: 5 ft 10 in (1.78 m)
- Position: Forward

Youth career
- 1967–1969: UC Riverside

International career
Years	Team	Apps	(Gls)
1972	United States Olympic	2	(0)

Managerial career
- 1977: Whittier College
- 1978–1979: UCLA (assistant)

Hugo Salcedo (born January 25, 1946) is a former soccer player who was a member of the U.S. Olympic soccer team. He coached at the collegiate level at UCLA and has spent over thirty years in various executive positions with FIFA, USSF and Major League Soccer.

== Player ==
Salcedo attended the University of California, Riverside where he played on the men's soccer team from 1967 to 1969. He holds the school's single season assist record with 14. He also played for the Compton Soccer Club at the time of the 1972 Summer Olympics. In 1971, he was part of the U.S. Pan American Games soccer team which finished with a 0-4-1 record. A year later, he played two games at the 1972 Summer Olympics. He graduated from UC Riverside with a bachelor's degree and later earned a master's degree in Psychiatric Social Work from the University of Southern California.

== Coach ==
Salcedo spent one season as the head soccer coach at Whittier College. In 1978, he became an assistant coach at UCLA, a position he held for two seasons. His son Jorge was a player at UCLA who went on to play for Morelia Monarcas in Mexico and for five Major League Soccer clubs before becoming the head coach of the UCLA Bruins men's soccer team in 2004.

== Executive ==
Salcedo has held various positions in USSF, FIFA, and Major League Soccer. In 1976, he joined the USSF Board of Directors. In 1982, he became part of the organizing committee developing the soccer tournament for the 1984 Summer Olympics. Three years later, he joined FIFA where he was a coordinator for Olympic and World Cup sites. In 1992, he became responsible for the oversight of the administrative portion of FIFA's coaching courses. Finally, he spent two years working for MLS in moving Hispanic players in to MLS.

== Sports agent ==
In 2005, Salcedo was hired by Proactive Sports Management, the leading agency representing U.S. soccer players. According to the company, he was hired, "to help the company establish a strong presence in the Latin American market."

In 2008, he was awarded the Jerry Yeagley Award for exceptional personal achievement. Salcedo's son Jorge later played in Major League Soccer and is the head soccer coach of UCLA.
