= UCLA–UC Santa Barbara men's soccer rivalry =

College soccer rivalry in California, U.S.

- UCLA Bruins UCSB Gauchos
- Sport: College soccer
- First meeting: September 3, 1967; UCLA 3–1 UCSB
- Latest meeting: November 21, 2024; UCSB 1–0^{OT} UCLA
- Stadiums: Annenberg Stadium (UCLA); Harder Stadium (UCSB)

Statistics
- Total meetings: 47
- All-time series: UCLA, 35–7–4
- Largest victory: UCLA 6–0 UCSB (1971)
- Longest win streak: 11, UCLA (1967–1981)
- Longest unbeaten streak: 11, UCLA (1967–1981)
- Current win streak: 1, UCSB (2024–)
- Current unbeaten streak: 1, UCSB (2024–)

Locations of UCLA and UCSB

The UCLA–UC Santa Barbara men's soccer rivalry or the 101 derby is a men's college soccer rivalry between the Los Angeles and Santa Barbara campuses of the University of California System. The rivalry dates back to 1967, when the two programs first played each other. The rivalry stems from the program's proximity and the vying for talent in the Southern California region, long considered a hotbed for soccer talent in the United States.

Overall, the two programs have played 46 times, with UCLA historically dominating the series, holding a 35–7–4 advantage over UCSB. The rivalry has become more competitive in recent times, with UCLA holding a 7–5–2 advantage dating back to the 2006 NCAA Division I Men's Soccer Tournament, where UCSB defeated UCLA in the final to win their first national championship.

In 2007, the college soccer website, CollegeSoccerNews.com rated the rivalry as the seventh-best college soccer rivalry in the nation.

== Rivalry ==
=== History ===
UCLA began their soccer program in the late 1930s, while UC Santa Barbara began their soccer program in the mid 1960s. The first meeting between the two sides was in 1967, where UCLA posted a 3–1 victory over UCSB. UCLA would win every encounter between the two sides until 1982, when UCSB registered its first win against UCLA.

For much of the rivalry until the 21st century, the series was heavily lopsided in favor of UCLA. In 2006, the series became more intense when the two sides met in St. Louis for the 2006 NCAA Championship Game, in which UCSB emerged victorious. Since then, the rivalry has been more evenly split between the two sides.

== Series ==
UCLA victories	UCSB victories

No.	Date	Location	Winner	Score
1	September 3, 1967	Los Angeles	UCLA	3–1
2	October 2, 1968	Los Angeles	UCLA	3–1
3	October 23, 1968	Los Angeles	Tie	0–0
4	October 1, 1969	Santa Barbara	UCLA	3–1
5	September 17, 1970	Santa Barbara	UCLA	3–1
6	October 27, 1971	Los Angeles	UCLA	6–0
7	October 12, 1973	Los Angeles	UCLA	6–1
8	September 27, 1974	Santa Barbara	UCLA	3–1
9	October 24, 1975	Santa Barbara	UCLA	2–1
10	October 29, 1976	Santa Barbara	UCLA	1–0
11	November 10, 1977	Los Angeles	UCLA	2–0
12	November 4, 1978	Santa Barbara	UCSB	2–0
13	September 23, 1979	Los Angeles	UCLA	2–0
14	November 5, 1980	Santa Barbara	UCLA	3–1
15	November 7, 1981	Los Angeles	UCLA	2–1
16	October 30, 1982	Santa Barbara	UCSB	3–1

No.	Date	Location	Winner	Score
17	October 15, 1983	Los Angeles	UCLA	2–1
18	November 2, 1984	Santa Barbara	UCLA	3–2
19	October 9, 1985	Los Angeles	UCLA	1–0
20	October 15, 1986	Santa Barbara	UCLA	4–2
21	October 18, 1987	Los Angeles	UCLA	2–0
22	October 25, 1992	Los Angeles	UCLA	2–0
23	October 17, 1993	Santa Barbara	UCLA	2–1
24	October 14, 1994	Los Angeles	UCLA	2–1
25	October 13, 1995	Santa Barbara	UCLA	2–0
26	October 4, 1996	Santa Barbara	UCLA	2–0
27	November 9, 1997	Los Angeles	UCLA	6–1
28	November 6, 1998	Santa Barbara	UCLA	3–2
29	October 10, 1999	Los Angeles	UCLA	3–1
30	September 24, 2000	Los Angeles	UCLA	2–0
31	September 28, 2001	Santa Barbara	Tie	0–0
32	October 20, 2005	Los Angeles	UCLA	1–0

No.	Date	Location	Winner	Score
33	October 5, 2006	Santa Barbara	UCLA	3–1
34	December 3, 2006	St. Louis (Note: 2006 NCAA Division I men's soccer championship game played at Hermann Stadium in St. Louis, Missouri.)	UCSB	2–1
35	October 1, 2008	Los Angeles	Tie	2–2
36	November 29, 2009	Los Angeles (Note: NCAA Division I men's soccer tournament game.)	UCLA	3–2
37	September 24, 2010	Santa Barbara	UCSB	2–0
38	September 16, 2011	Los Angeles	UCLA	3–2
39	September 21, 2012	Santa Barbara	Tie	1–1
40	September 13, 2013	Los Angeles	UCLA	1–0
41	September 20, 2014	Santa Barbara	UCLA	1–0
42	September 21, 2015	Los Angeles	UCSB	4–2
43	September 17, 2016	Santa Barbara	UCLA	2–1
44	September 22, 2018	Santa Barbara	UCSB	3–1
45	November 18, 2021	Los Angeles	UCLA	2–1
46	November 21, 2024	Los Angeles	UCSB	1–0^{OT}
Series: UCLA leads 35–7–4
