= Adolfo Gregorio =

American soccer player

Personal information
- Full name: Adolfo Sousa Gregorio
- Date of birth: October 1, 1982 (age 44)
- Place of birth: Turlock, California, U.S.
- Height: 1.75 m (5 ft 9 in)
- Position: Midfielder

Youth career
- Turlock Tornados
- 1999: IMG Soccer Academy

College career
Years	Team	Apps	(Gls)
2000–2003	UCLA Bruins		

Senior career*
Years	Team	Apps	(Gls)
2003	Orange County Blue Star	11	(1)
2004–2005	Darlington	24	(2)
2005	Real Salt Lake	6	(0)

International career
1998–1999	United States U17	20	(0)
2000	United States U18	3	(0)
2003	United States U23	2	(0)
- * Club domestic league appearances and goals

Adolfo Sousa Gregorio (born October 1, 1982) is an American former soccer midfielder who formerly played for Real Salt Lake of Major League Soccer.

Gregorio was part of the original 1999 class at the Bradenton Academy, whereas part of the Under-17 United States national team. He played for his country at the 1999 Under-17 World Cup in New Zealand and also represented the U.S. on the Under-20 level.

After playing college soccer at UCLA, where he helped the Bruins to the College Cup in 2002, Gregorio then briefly played alongside Jürgen Klinsmann for Orange County Blue Star in the USL Premier Development League.

Gregorio was chosen by Colorado Rapids with the 15th pick of the 2004 MLS SuperDraft. However, he elected to try his luck in Europe, signing with English club Darlington. After one year in England, Gregorio returned to the US after his rights were acquired by Real Salt Lake, then led by his former Under-17 coach, John Ellinger. RSL traded a permanent international roster slot and a first-round pick in the 2007 MLS Supplemental Draft to Colorado for the right to sign Gregorio.

Gregorio was released by Real Salt Lake during the 2006 preseason.
