= 1985 NCAA Division I men's soccer tournament =

1985 Men's College Cup

Tournament details
- Country: United States
- Venue(s): Kingdome (Washington (state)) Seattle, Washington
- Teams: 23

Final positions
- Champions: UCLA (1st title)
- Runners-up: American
- Semifinalists: Evansville; Hartwick

Tournament statistics
- Matches played: 22
- Goals scored: 64 (2.91 per match)
- Attendance: 54,206 (2,464 per match)
- Top goal scorer(s): Dale Ervine, UCLA (4)

Awards
- Best player: Dale Ervine, UCLA (offensive); Paul Caligiuri, UCLA (defensive)

The 1985 NCAA Division I men's soccer tournament was the 27th annual tournament organized by the National Collegiate Athletic Association to determine the national champion of men's collegiate soccer among its Division I members in the United States.

UCLA won their first national title, defeating American in the championship game, 1–0, after eight overtime periods.

The final match was played on December 14 at the Kingdome in Seattle, Washington.

== Qualifying ==
No teams made their debut appearance in the NCAA Division I men's soccer tournament.

== Bracket ==
First round
Long Island | 1
Columbia (OT) | 3
Clemson | 5
NC State | 2
Duke | 0
South Carolina | 3
George Mason | 1
Virginia | 0
Akron | 0
Indiana | 2
UCLA | 3
California | 1
Fresno State | 1
UNLV | 2

Second round
Hartwick College | 2
Columbia | 0
Connecticut | 1
Boston University (OT/PK) | 2
Clemson | 0
South Carolina (OT/PK) | 1
American | 3
George Mason | 1
Evansville | 3
Indiana | 0
Temple | 5
Penn State (OT/PK) | 6
UCLA (OT) | 1
UNLV | 0
SMU | 2
Air Force | 1

Quarterfinals
Hartwick College | 1
Boston University | 0
South Carolina | 0
American | 2
Evansville | 1
Penn State | 0
UCLA | 2
SMU | 0

Semifinals
Hartwick College | 0
American | 1
Evansville | 1
UCLA | 3

Championship
American | 0
UCLA (8OT) | 1

== Final ==
This game is the longest game in NCAA soccer history, with the winning goal scored at 166 minutes and 5 seconds of playing time. After this game and the 1982 final both went to eight overtimes, the NCAA changed the rules for the 1986 season from unlimited 10-minute overtimes to a maximum of two 30-minute periods divided into halves.

December 14, 1985

| American | 0–1 (a.e.t.) | UCLA |
|---|---|---|
| | | Andy Burke 167' |

Kingdome, Seattle, Washington
Attendance: 5,986

Team details

American
UCLA

== See also ==
- 1985 NCAA women's soccer tournament
- 1985 NCAA Division II soccer tournament
- 1985 NCAA Division III soccer tournament
- 1985 NAIA men's soccer championship
