= Steve Gay =

American soccer player and coach (born 1947)

Steven Gay
Personal information
- Full name: Robert Steven Gay
- Date of birth: September 1, 1947 (age 79)
- Place of birth: La Paz, Bolivia
- Height: 6 ft 2 in (1.88 m)
- Position: Forward

Youth career
- 1966–1969: Westmont College

Senior career*
Years	Team	Apps	(Gls)
1975	Los Angeles Aztecs (indoor)		

Managerial career
- 1975–1979: UCLA
- * Club domestic league appearances and goals

Steve Gay (born September 1, 1947, in La Paz, Bolivia) is a former U.S. collegiate soccer player. He played as a forward and was on the U.S. soccer team at the 1972 Summer Olympics. He went on to coach the UCLA men's soccer team from 1975 to 1979.

== Club career ==
Gay attended NAIA Westmont College, located in Santa Barbara, California, where he starred on the men's soccer team from 1966 to 1969. He holds several school scoring records including most points in a season with 80 (30 goals and 8 assists) in 1968. He is also the career points leader with 203. Finally, he scored 88 goals in his four seasons at Westmont. In 1968, Gay was selected as a third team All American. He was inducted into the NAIA Soccer Hall of Fame in 1977 and the Westmont Hall of Fame in 1995. In 1975, he played for the Los Angeles Aztecs during the North American Soccer League's indoor season.

== 1972 Olympic team ==
In 1971, the U.S. Olympic soccer team began qualification games for the 1972 Summer Olympics. On July 25, 1971, he scored a hat trick in a 3–0 victory over Bermuda. The U.S. qualified for the games and Gay was selected to the U.S. roster. The U.S. went 0–2–1 in group play and did not make the second round. Gay played the second game, a 3–0 loss to Malaysia when he came on for John Carenza. In the third game, a 7–0 blow out at the hands of the host West German team, Gay started the game, but came out for Zylker.

== Coaching UCLA ==
In 1975, UCLA hired Gay to coach its men's soccer team. Over the five seasons Gay spent as head coach, he compiled a 72–34–10 record before handing the team over to former assistant Sigi Schmid in 1980.

Gay has continued to coach youth soccer after founding the Arizona Soccer Camp in 1978 with Alan Meeder.
