= Sigi Schmid =

German-American soccer coach (1953–2018)

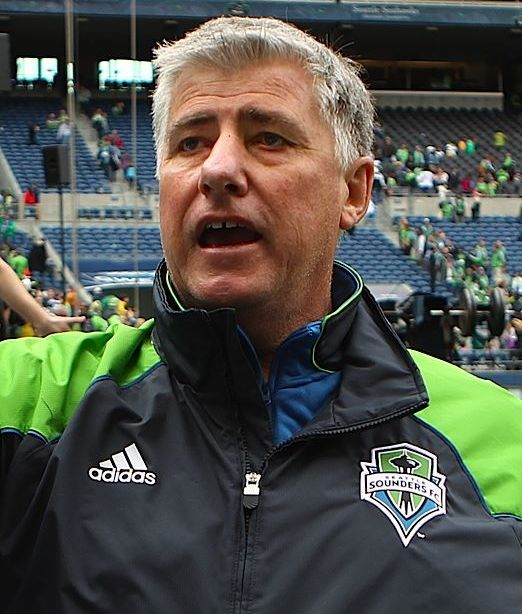
- Schmid after a Sounders match in 2010

Personal information
- Full name: Siegfried Schmid
- Date of birth: March 20, 1953
- Place of birth: Tübingen, Baden-Württemberg, West Germany
- Date of death: December 25, 2018 (aged 65)
- Place of death: Los Angeles, California, United States
- Position: Midfielder

College career
Years	Team	Apps	(Gls)
1972–1975	UCLA Bruins		

Managerial career
- 1980–1999: UCLA Bruins
- 1998–1999: United States U20
- 1999–2004: LA Galaxy
- 2005: United States U20
- 2006–2008: Columbus Crew
- 2009–2016: Seattle Sounders FC
- 2017–2018: LA Galaxy

Siegfried "Sigi" Schmid (German: [ˈziːkfʀiːt ˈziːɡiː ʃmiːt]; March 20, 1953 – December 25, 2018) was a German-American soccer coach.

Born in Tübingen, West Germany, he moved to the United States with his family when he was a child. He played college soccer from 1972 to 1975 at the University of California, Los Angeles (UCLA), where he was a starting midfielder. He coached his former college team, the UCLA Bruins from 1980 to 1999. During that period, he became one of the most successful collegiate coaches of all time, leading the Bruins to a record of 322–63–33 (wins–losses–draws). The team made 16 consecutive playoff appearances from 1983 to 1998, winning the national championship in 1985, 1990, and 1997. Schmid also worked with U.S. Soccer throughout the 1990s.

Schmid coached the Los Angeles Galaxy, Columbus Crew and Seattle Sounders FC in the MLS. Despite never having played soccer at a professional level, he has the most coaching wins in MLS history and was the recipient of the MLS Coach of the Year Award in 1999 and 2008. Throughout his career, Schmid received praise from critics for his ability to identify new talent. His defensive tactics were also highly regarded in the press and often cited as a factor in his success. However, their deployment in his final two seasons with Los Angeles led directly to the termination of his contract.

After winning the MLS Cup with Columbus in 2008, Schmid was hired by the expansion Seattle Sounders as their first head coach. From 2009 to 2016, Schmid led the Sounders to seven playoff appearances, four Lamar Hunt U.S. Open Cup titles, and an MLS Supporters' Shield in 2014. After lackluster performances in the playoffs and missteps during the first half of the 2016 season, Schmid left the club on mutual terms. He again coached LA Galaxy from 2017 to 2018, dying later that year.

== Early life ==
Sigi Schmid was born in Tübingen, West Germany, on March 20, 1953. At the age of four, he moved with his family to the United States; they took up residence in Torrance, California, in 1962. Schmid's father, Fritz, who had been a prisoner of war during World War II, worked at Pabst Brewing; his mother, Doris, ran a Los Angeles–based German deli, where Schmid worked on weekends. Schmid's family spoke German at home, making him feel German despite spending so much of his life in America. He began school in the United States with little understanding of English and a stuttering speech disorder he did not overcome until high school. In his youth, Schmid visited Germany every summer, playing soccer with the local children and watching Bundesliga clubs play exhibition matches in neighboring towns. In 1964, Schmid played for one of the inaugural American Youth Soccer Organization teams, and was inducted into the AYSO Hall of Fame in 1996.

Despite Schmid's early soccer experience, his parents thought a career in the sport was unfeasible and encouraged him to pursue business. He enrolled at UCLA in 1972 and was a starting midfielder for the UCLA Bruins from 1972 to 1975. In his first two seasons, the Bruins were national runners-up in the championships, and advanced to the national semifinals in 1974. In his senior year, Schmid was selected to the 1975 All Far-West team. Schmid completed his playing career at UCLA ranked 11th in all-time assists at the school.

He received his Bachelor of Economics degree in 1976 before earning a Master of Business Administration from the University of Southern California. Between 1978 and 1984, he worked eight months of the year as a Certified Public Accountant (CPA).

== Coaching career ==
=== UCLA and U.S. Soccer ===
Schmid's first coaching experience was in 1975 for Bishop Montgomery High School. He also founded and coached a small club called the South Bay Vikings. Between 1977 and 1979, he served as an assistant coach under Steve Gay at UCLA. Schmid took over as head coach after Gay left the position in 1980. He began focusing solely on coaching before the 1984 season and was named "Coach of the Year" by the magazine Soccer America. UCLA then won the 1985 NCAA Division I championship by defeating American University 1–0 after eight periods of overtime. In his first 10 years as coach, the Bruins won or tied 85 percent of their games.

The Bruins won the 1990 national championship by defeating Rutgers 4–3 on penalty kicks after a scoreless regulation, two sessions of overtime, and another two periods of sudden death. During the 22-game season, UCLA outscored their opponents 61–16. The team continued to thrive in the following season, part of their success coming from Schmid's decision to move Cobi Jones from a midfield position to forward. Jones later played for Schmid in the MLS and became a top player for the national team. Schmid was named the Mountain Pacific Sports Federation Coach of the Year for three years straight (1995–97), and NCAA Coach of the Year in 1997 after UCLA defeated the University of Virginia to win a third NCAA championship. A reporter for the Richmond Times-Dispatch wrote that after winning just two titles in 17 postseason appearances, UCLA had finally shed "its 'underachiever' label". The writer also applauded Schmid's decision to move the team's leading striker into a midfield position which led to the player scoring the winning goal.

Schmid spent 19 seasons as the head coach at UCLA, accumulating a record of 322–63–33 (wins–losses–draws), and reaching 16 consecutive playoffs between 1983 and 1998. He earned a reputation for producing some of the nation's best goalkeepers when David Vanole, Brad Friedel, and Matt Reis came through the university. By 1994, he had coached 16 players at UCLA who were later selected for the U.S. national team. Schmid avoided recruiting foreign talent to bolster his squad. He relied mainly on players from California, whom he believed to be less physically aggressive but more creative and attacking.

Sigi comes up to me after a game and says, "See you on the state team." But I wasn't on the state team. Next thing I knew, I got a tryout and was on the team, and it was his doing. Obviously, I owe a lot to him.

— Eric Wynalda, National Soccer Hall of Fame inductee

While coaching at UCLA, Schmid began to work with the U.S. national team. He was the assistant coach at the 1991 World University Games and traveled with the team to Germany in the fall of 1992. In January 1993, he was selected as an assistant to Bora Milutinović for the 1994 FIFA World Cup, during which five of Schmid's UCLA players appeared for the national team. He continued as an assistant during the 1995 Pan American Games. After being appointed U.S. Under-20 national team coach in January 1998, Schmid built his squad around defensive tactics. The team achieved second place in their group during the 1999 FIFA World Youth Championship, defeating England and Cameroon, but were eliminated by the eventual champions Spain in the opening knockout round. Schmid returned to coach the U-20 national team at the 2005 FIFA World Youth Championship. The U.S. won the group in the opening stage of the tournament without conceding a goal, but lost to Italy in the first round of the knockout stage. One of the forwards on the national team, Eric Wynalda, said that Schmid's organization on the field was disciplined. Wynalda commented that Schmid had a "great handle on the defensive side of the game" while he also admired that the strikers were allowed to be creative. Schmid was inducted into the UCLA Hall of Fame in 2004 after working with UCLA, the national team, and the Los Angeles Galaxy.

=== LA Galaxy ===
Schmid left UCLA to replace Octavio Zambrano as head coach of the Los Angeles Galaxy five games into the 1999 MLS season. At the time, the team was ranked fifth in the Western Conference with a tally of only three goals. Under Schmid in the remainder of the season, the team had a record of 17–9, finished with the second-best record in the league and won their conference, earning him the MLS Coach of the Year Award. The team's captain, Robin Fraser, gave credit to Schmid's emphasis on defense after being named the MLS defender of the year. Los Angeles lost 2–0 to D.C. United in that year's MLS Cup. Schmid made critical comments of the referees after the match; he received a $1,000 fine and suspension for the first game of the following season.

In 2000, Schmid guided Los Angeles to the playoffs but lost in the semifinals to the Kansas City Wizards. The team also played in that year's CONCACAF Champions' Cup, a competition consisting of the best clubs from North America, Central America, and the Caribbean. The Galaxy defeated the Honduran champion Olimpia 3–2 to win the Cup. Schmid was forced to play an atypical squad since the final was held during the MLS off-season while adjustments to the following season's lineup were being made.

His successful team of 2001 enjoyed attacking play. The squad included experienced players such as Cobi Jones, Sasha Victorine, Luis Hernández, Simon Elliott, and Mauricio Cienfuegos. The Galaxy won the conference by two points and finished fourth overall with a 14–7–5 record. The team went on to lose to the San Jose Earthquakes in the MLS Cup, but won the U.S. Open Cup a week later with a 2–1 overtime victory against the New England Revolution.

From the moment you are signed with Los Angeles you come in to an environment that not only encourages but demands 100 percent effort.

— Alexi Lalas, American former soccer player

Success followed in 2002 when the Galaxy won the Supporters' Shield for having the best regular season record in the league. Schmid was lauded for his defensive tactics after adjusting the team's standard formation to a 3–5–2 early in the season. The shift allowed Alexi Lalas to play as a sweeper without specific marking responsibilities in the three-man defensive line. Schmid also brought Guatemalan forward Carlos Ruiz to the team; Ruiz won league Most Valuable Player (MVP) award that year. Amidst criticism for failing to win in previous years, the franchise won its first MLS Cup with a 1–0 overtime victory against New England. The team again reached the Open Cup final but lost to the Columbus Crew.

Victory in the MLS Cup earned the team another berth in the 2003 CONCACAF Champions' Cup. Los Angeles advanced past Motagua in the first round but fell against Necaxa in the quarterfinals. In MLS, the club had its first losing season with a 9–12–9 record and no victories on the road. The Galaxy failed to score goals consistently during the year, managing only a fourth-place finish in the five-team Western Conference. In the first round of the playoffs, Los Angeles defeated San Jose 2–0 in the first leg, but during the second leg, conceded five goals in the second half of the match and were eliminated. Schmid was criticized by fans and the press speculated he would not return in 2004. A local writer put some of the blame on a switch to defensive style of play while some players questioned his tactics. After it was announced that he would remain in his role next season, Schmid expected a year of rebuilding the team. The following year, he was picked to coach the Western Conference in the All-Star game. Midway through the season, with the Galaxy in first place, Schmid was fired after a five-game stretch without any wins, in which the team scored only three goals. General manager Doug Hamilton said that the team had a mission "to compete for and win championships", and that "a more entertaining and attractive product on the field." was needed. Schmid left with an overall record of 79–53–32 with a 16–7–3 mark in the playoffs.

Reflecting on his demeanor in Los Angeles, Lalas said Schmid had "epic explosions". One reporter called him "combustible", while another referred to him as "fiery". Lalas also commented that playing for Schmid in Los Angeles required professionalism on and off the field.

=== Columbus Crew ===
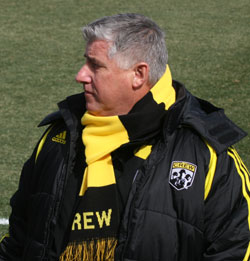
Schmid in 2008

Schmid returned to the league as coach of the Columbus Crew in 2006, rated by the team's general manager Mark McCullers as "the best coach in America". The team contained young talent but lacked depth and had no star players. In August, after a streak of 13 winless matches, Schmid considered resigning. The team suffered from injuries and inconsistent lineups throughout the season, finishing last in the Eastern Conference with just 30 goals, the lowest in the league.

By the start of 2007, Schmid had rebuilt the roster, keeping only three players he had inherited and acquiring Argentine attacker Guillermo Barros Schelotto. Schmid cut the Crew's goalkeeper, Jon Busch, who had been with the team for five years. Schmid had concerns over Busch's playing style and fitness. Busch later criticized Schmid's management skills, and said he would never work for the coach again, but gave credit to Schmid's tactical approach. Scheletto's contributions were crucial to Columbus's improvement that season, but the team failed to make the playoffs. A writer for ESPN speculated that the Crew suffered because the team management would not spend more money, while Schmid lamented that he could not attract a foreign star to the little-known city of Columbus.

The Crew's performance improved remarkably in the 2008 season. Schmid adjusted their offensive tactics to be based on ball possession and flank speed. He made Schelotto a central part of the plan in a roaming playmaker position, a role in which Schelotto excelled and the Argentinian was named the league's MVP. With a 1–0 victory over the Houston Dynamo at Crew Stadium on April 26, Schmid became the second MLS coach to win 100 regular-season games. The Crew went on to win the Supporters' Shield with the best record in the league. In the playoffs, Columbus defeated the New York Red Bulls 3–1 at Schmid's former home stadium, Los Angeles's Home Depot Center, to win the MLS Cup. Schmid received the Coach of the Year Award for the second time. Part of the success was attributed to Schmid's restructuring of the squad in 2006 and 2007.

Schmid declined a contract offer from Columbus after the 2008 season and became coach of Seattle Sounders FC. The Crew's ownership believed that Schmid had been in contact with Sounders despite being denied permission to talk to other teams during the season. It was also alleged that he shared confidential information with Seattle after his contract with the Crew had ended. The MLS ruled that no tampering had occurred, but ordered Sounders FC to financially compensate the Crew.

=== Seattle Sounders FC ===
Schmid was named the first coach of the new expansion franchise, Seattle Sounders FC. In their 2009 inaugural season, Seattle defeated D.C. United to win the U.S. Open Cup. On October 24, 2009, Seattle defeated FC Dallas 2–1, giving Schmid his 125th career MLS regular season win; this win moved Schmid past Bob Bradley for the most wins in MLS history. He led Seattle to the playoffs where, in the first round, the Dynamo defeated the team 1–0 in overtime of the second leg. Seattle was the first expansion team to make the playoffs in an inaugural season since the 1998 Chicago Fire, when the league was just two years old.

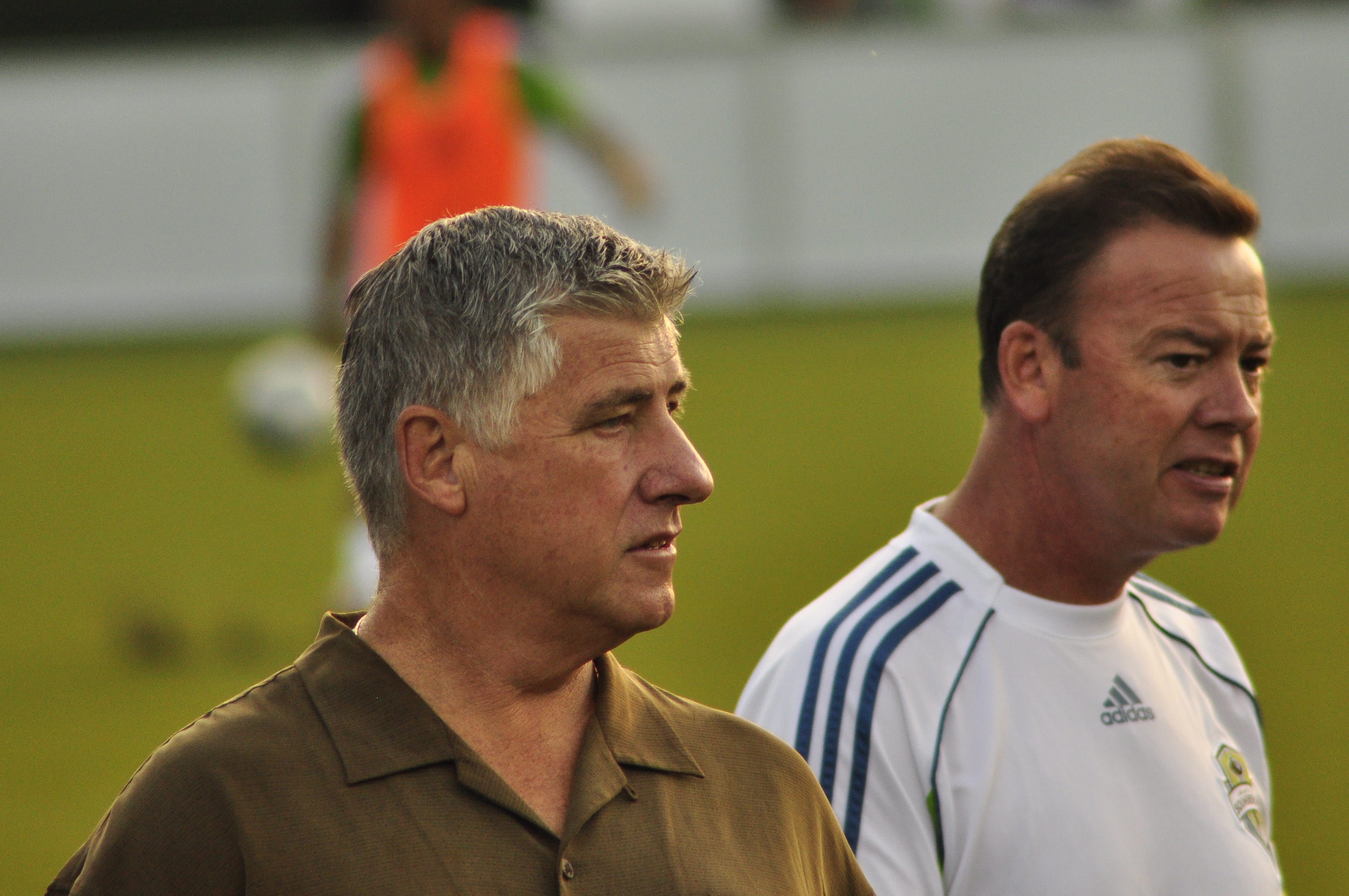
Schmid and a member of his staff before a 2010 U.S. Open Cup match

The team began the 2010 MLS season slowly with injuries to key players that impacted Schmid's starting lineups. The team had a record of 4–8–3 over the first 15 games. The Sounders also advanced through the preliminary round of the 2010–11 CONCACAF Champions League but failed to get past the group stage. The 2010 U.S. Open Cup campaign culminated in Schmid winning his third championship with a 2–1 victory over the Crew at Seattle's Qwest Field. No MLS team had previously won back-to-back Open Cups. The Sounders rebounded in the second half of the regular season with a 10–2–3 record to qualify for the playoffs. The team faced Bruce Arena's Galaxy in the two-legged quarter-final. Both coaches are considered to be among the best in the MLS, and it was the first meeting between the two in the playoffs. The Sounders lost by a 3–1 aggregate and Arena moved within one game of Schmid's MLS postseason record of 19 wins.

In 2011, Schmid's Sounders FC had many setbacks and a slow start to the season (the club won just 3 of its first 10 matches). Schmid signed a long-term contract extension on July 14, 2011, potentially keeping him with the club through the 2015 MLS season (depending on club options and performance triggers). Although some fans had become frustrated with what they saw as tactical inflexibility and mismanagement of players, general manager Adrian Hanauer praised Schmid's professionalism and success. The Sounders went on to finish the regular season with the second-best record in the league at 18 wins, 7 losses, 9 draws, and qualified for the playoffs for a third consecutive year. Schmid again led his club to the final of the U.S. Open Cup tournament. They defeated the Chicago Fire 2–0 to become the first team since 1968 to win the tournament three times consecutively. Seattle also advanced to the knock-out stages of the CONCACAF Champions League. However, in the MLS playoffs, Sounders FC was again eliminated from the MLS Cup playoffs in the conference semifinal round by Real Salt Lake.

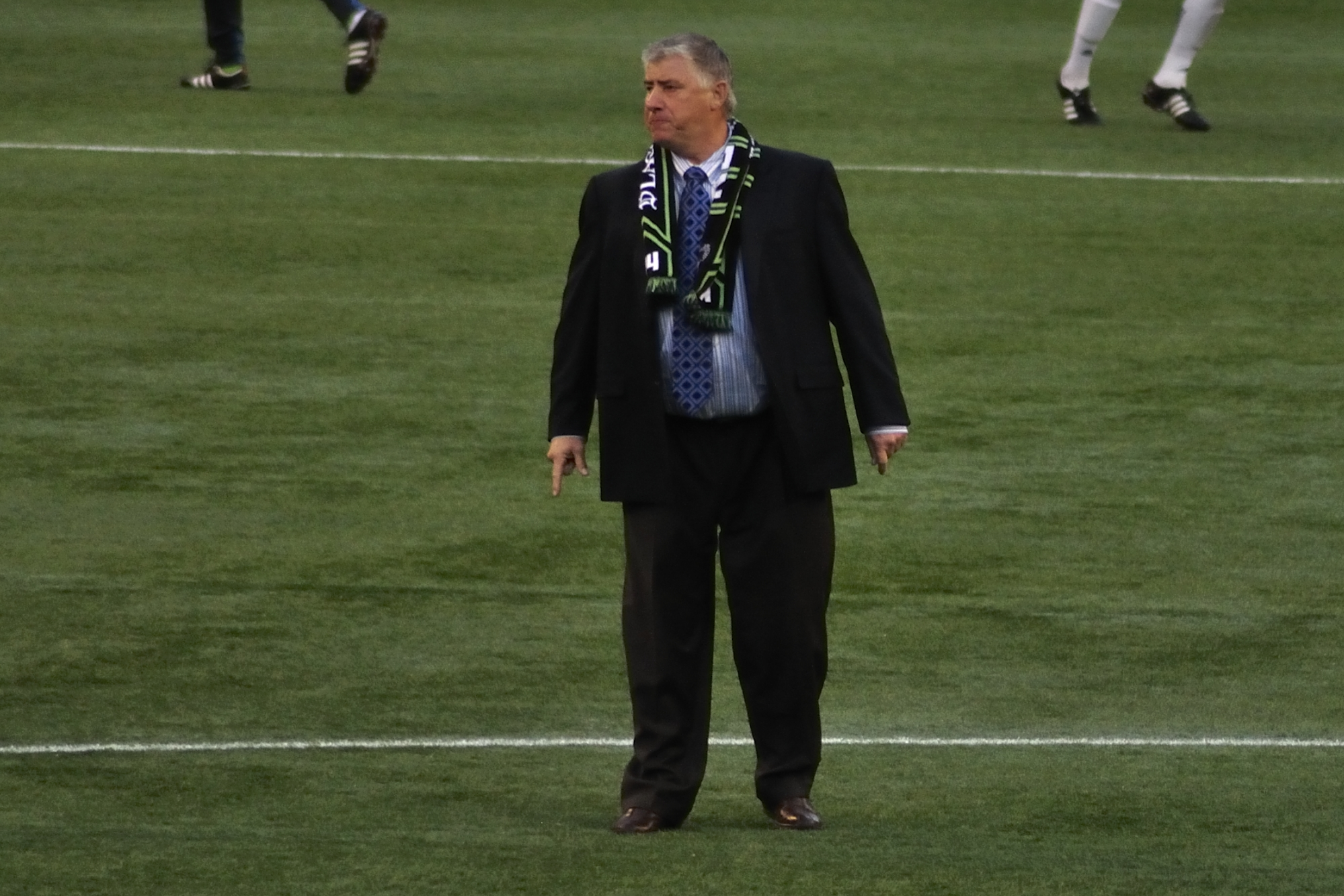
Schmid in 2011

In 2012, Seattle lost in the 2-legged 2011–12 CONCACAF Champions League quarter finals by an aggregate score of 7–3 to Santos Laguna. The Sounders advanced to the finals of the Open Cup where they were defeated by Sporting Kansas City after penalty kicks. Schmid was furious over what he saw as a controversial call that handed Kansas City the victory. The team finished the regular season with a 15–8–11 record to make the playoffs where they advanced past Real Salt Lake to reach the conference championship series against the Galaxy. The team played defensive and suffered a 3–0 blowout in the first leg. They won on the return leg but lost on aggregate.

The Sounders began the 2013 regular season without a win until their sixth match. After advancing through the early stages of the 2012–13 CONCACAF Champions League the year prior, Seattle lost in the semifinals to Santos Laguna. The team was knocked out of the 2013 Open Cup in their first match against the lower division Tampa Bay Rowdies. Seattle would rally during the middle of the season to put the Supporter's Shield and the regional Cascadia Cup in reach. However, the team ended the season on a skid of seven matches without a win that included substantial losses to both Colorado and rival Vancouver. The Sounders beat Colorado in the knockout round of the 2013 MLS Cup Playoffs before losing two matches against arch-rival Portland. At the end of the season, a poll in The Seattle Times showed that many fans wanted to see Schmid fired. Pundits speculated on the possibility of his termination based on what they saw as poor tactics, a history of mismanaging skilled players, and a fan base that had higher expectations. Owner Joe Roth held a post-season meeting with Hanauer and Schmid. Roth later said that the possibility of Schmid losing his job was "close", but instead opted for personnel changes to the squad.

Consequently, Schmid met with a core group of players represented by Osvaldo Alonso, Clint Dempsey, and Brad Evans. The group agreed on changes to the team. Starting striker Eddie Johnson was later traded while a new central defender, winger, midfielder, goalkeeper, and depth at the forward position were brought in. The team played 2014 with Dempsey and Obafemi Martins playing more through the middle as the Sounders won the US Open Cup and the Supporters Shield.

He spent part of the 2015–16 offseason with AS Roma to study their training methods. During the first half of the 2016 season, the Sounders failed to meet expectations, placing near the bottom of the league with 6 wins, 12 losses, and 2 draws. After a 3–0 loss on July 24 to Sporting Kansas City, in which the Sounders had only one shot, Schmid left the club on mutual terms and was replaced by assistant coach Brian Schmetzer.

After leaving the Sounders, Schmid joined ESPN as a studio analyst.

=== Return to LA Galaxy ===
On July 27, 2017, the LA Galaxy named Schmid as their new coach, replacing Curt Onalfo—the assistant coach and successor to Bruce Arena, who had departed the Galaxy in November 2016 to take over the United States men's national team. Under Onalfo, the Galaxy had lost half of their 20 matches and were on a five-match losing streak in mid-July, missing several key players to injuries. Schmid's first match for the Galaxy in 2017 ended in a scoreless draw against the Seattle Sounders, but the team would only win two matches before ending the season in last place—missing the playoffs for the first time since 2008 and the fourth time in their history.

Schmid was given greater powers related to player personnel decisions by the Galaxy, similar to that of Arena's tenure and replacing roles served by general manager Pete Vagenas, and looked to enter the 2018 season with a "winning" roster. During the offseason, the Galaxy overhauled its roster and declined to re-sign several starting players, including captain Jermaine Jones and homegrown player Gyasi Zardes. Schmid replaced the core team with free agents and trades from other MLS teams, including Perry Kitchen, Chris Pontius, Ola Kamara, and David Bingham. The Galaxy also signed star striker Zlatan Ibrahimović, who Schmid hoped would be a "positive impact" on the team.

The Galaxy started the season with injuries to key players and some of its new arrivals. The team scored an early victory against new rival Los Angeles FC in the inaugural match of "El Tráfico", with Ibrahimović debuting as a substitute and leading the team to a 4–3 win. The Galaxy then slipped and lost four matches in a row, several by a single goal, but recovered and embarked on a nine-match unbeaten streak that lasted until August. The Galaxy then failed to win its next five matches under Schmid and slipped to eighth place in the Western Conference, conceding 11 goals in two away matches to Seattle and Salt Lake. Schmid resigned from the Galaxy on September 10, 2018, and was replaced by assistant coach Dominic Kinnear. Kinnear replaced Schmid's 3–5–2 formation with a conventional 4–4–2 lineup and returned the team to playoff contention, but ultimately failed to clinch a playoff berth.

== Personal life ==
Schmid lived in Bellevue, Washington, during the soccer season. He was married to Valerie Schmid and had four children: Erik, Lacey, Kurt, and Kyle. Kurt has been the head scout for Sounders FC and was also the Director of Player Personnel and Scouting for the L.A. Galaxy. Kyle played as a defender at UC Irvine and was in the USL Premier Development League with Orange County Blue Star. Kyle is now head coach at Loyola Marymount University. Sigi rarely missed game days in MLS, but took time off for Lacey and Kurt's weddings and Kurt's college graduation. Schmid's younger brother, Roland, lived in Sammamish, Washington, and having family in the area was one of the factors which persuaded Schmid to accept the Seattle job. After leaving the Galaxy in September 2018, Schmid stated that he planned to join another MLS club's front office or write a book.

Schmid was hospitalized several times during his later career, including once for a bout of pneumonia in 2009 and again for an undisclosed issue in 2015 that required him to miss a regular season match with the Sounders.

== Illness and death ==
Schmid had weight and heart issues that later factored into his decision to retire from the LA Galaxy in 2018. He was hospitalized on December 10, 2018, in Los Angeles and placed in intensive care at Ronald Reagan UCLA Medical Center while awaiting a heart transplant. Schmid died on December 25, 2018, at the age of 65. A memorial service was held in Manhattan Beach, California, on January 18, 2019.

== Legacy ==
Schmid has been described as one of the two "godfathers" of American soccer, alongside long-time rival Bruce Arena, with connections to the coaching and technical staffs across MLS. In the days after his death, Schmid's contributions to the game and his treatment of players and coaches under his wing were highlighted in eulogies and memorials. On January 11, 2019, MLS announced that it would rename its Coach of the Year Award to the Sigi Schmid Coach of the Year Award in honor of Schmid's contributions to the league.

== Coaching statistics ==
Coaching record by team and tenure
Team	Nat	From	To	Record					Ref
Team	Nat	From	To	G	W	D	L	Win %	Ref
LA Galaxy	(United States)	April 22, 1999	August 16, 2004	218	110	44	64	50.46	
Columbus Crew	(United States)	October 20, 2005	December 16, 2008	101	39	26	36	38.61	
Seattle Sounders FC	(United States)	December 16, 2008	July 26, 2016	331	158	69	104	47.73	
LA Galaxy	(United States)	July 27, 2017	September 10, 2018	44	13	12	19	29.55	
Total				694	320	151	223	46.11	—

== Honors ==
=== Coach ===
UCLA

- College Cup: 1985, 1990, 1997

LA Galaxy

- CONCACAF Champions' Cup: 2000
- MLS Cup: 2002
- Supporters' Shield: 2002
- Lamar Hunt U.S. Open Cup: 2001

Columbus Crew

- MLS Cup 2008
- Supporters' Shield: 2008

Seattle Sounders FC

- Supporters' Shield: 2014
- Lamar Hunt U.S. Open Cup: 2009, 2010 2011, 2014

=== Individual ===
- National Soccer Hall of Fame: 2015
- NCAA Coach of the Year: 1997
- MLS Coach of the Year Award: 1999, 2008
- UCLA Athletics Hall of Fame inductee: 1996

== See also ==
- List of Major League Soccer coaches
