= Todd Saldana =

American soccer player (born 1962)

Personal information
- Date of birth: January 15, 1962 (age 64)
- Place of birth: Redondo Beach, California, U.S.
- Position: Midfielder

Youth career
- 1978: South Torrance High School

Senior career*
Years	Team	Apps	(Gls)
1980–1981	Los Angeles Aztecs	5	(0)
1980–1981	Los Angeles Aztecs (indoor)	11	(3)
1982	San Jose Earthquakes	4	(0)
1982–1983	Tulsa Roughnecks	13	(1)
1982–1983	Tulsa Roughnecks (indoor)		
1984–1985	Fort Lauderdale Sun		
1987	Los Angeles Heat		
1989	California Kickers		

International career
1981	U.S. U-20		

Managerial career
- 1989–1994: UCLA Bruins (assistant)
- 1995–1996: Cal Poly Pomona (men)
- 1995–1996: Cal Poly Pomona (women)
- 1997: Loyola Marymount Lions (men)
- 1998: UCLA Bruins (women)
- 1999–2001: UCLA Bruins (men)
- * Club domestic league appearances and goals

Todd Saldana (born January 15, 1962) is an American retired soccer midfielder. He played four seasons in the North American Soccer League, two in the United Soccer League and two in the Western Soccer Alliance. He was a member of the United States U-20 men's national soccer team at the 1981 FIFA World Youth Championship and has coached at the collegiate level including three seasons as the head coach of the UCLA Bruins men's soccer team.

== Club career ==
Saldana graduated from South Torrance High School where he was a 1978 Third Team High School All American soccer player. In 1980, the Los Angeles Aztecs of the North American Soccer League drafted Saldana out of high school. He played five games for the Aztecs over two seasons before being sent to the San Jose Earthquakes for the 1982 season. In May 1982, the Earthquakes traded Saldana, two draft choices and cash to the Tulsa Roughnecks in exchange for Joe Morrone, Jr. He played two outdoor seasons and one indoor season with Tulsa. In 1984, he signed with the Fort Lauderdale Sun of the United Soccer League. He played twenty-one games and scored three goals as the Sun won the league championship. In 1985, he returned to the team, now known as the South Florida Sun, but the league collapsed after six games. In 1987, he played for the Los Angeles Heat of the Western Soccer Alliance. In 1989, he played for the California Kickers, also of the WSA.

== International career ==
In 1981, Saldana played two games for United States U-20 men's national soccer team at the 1981 FIFA World Youth Championship.

== Coaching career ==
From 1989 to 1994, Saldana served as an assistant coach with the UCLA Bruins. In 1995, he was hired as head coach of Cal Poly Pomona before moving to the Loyola Marymount Lions in 1997 where he had a 6–9–1 season. In 1998, he was hired as the UCLA women's soccer coach and took the team to a 17–4–1 record. In May 1999, he moved over to become the head coach of the men's program. Over three seasons, he compiled a 43–17–4.
