= Jorge Salcedo (soccer) =

American soccer player and coach (born 1972)

Personal information
- Date of birth: September 27, 1972 (age 54)
- Place of birth: Cerritos, California, U.S.
- Height: 6 ft 1 in (1.85 m)
- Position: Defender

Youth career
- 1990–1993: UCLA Bruins

Senior career*
Years	Team	Apps	(Gls)
1994–1995	Los Angeles Salsa		
1995	Atlético Morelia	6	(0)
1996	Los Angeles Galaxy	29	(2)
1997	Columbus Crew	28	(1)
1998	Chicago Fire	11	(0)
1998–1999	Tampa Bay Mutiny	38	(1)
1999–2000	Los Angeles Galaxy	8	(0)
2000	Orange County Zodiac	2	(0)

International career
1994–1998	United States	3	(0)

Managerial career
- 2001–2003: UCLA Bruins (assistant)
- 2004–2019: UCLA Bruins
- * Club domestic league appearances and goals

Jorge Salcedo (born September 27, 1972) is an American former soccer player and coach. He was the head coach of the UCLA Bruins men's soccer team. He is an American retired soccer defender who played professionally in Mexico and Major League Soccer. He earned three caps with the United States men's national soccer team.

Salcedo was arrested March 12, 2019 for conspiracy to commit racketeering for participation in the 2019 college admissions bribery scandal. He resigned from his coaching position in the wake of the scandal. He pleaded guilty to the charges in April 2020. He was later sentenced in March 2021 to, among other things, eight months in prison.

== Playing career ==
=== High school and college ===
Salcedo, son of soccer player Hugo Salcedo, grew up in Cerritos, California. He attended Cerritos High School where he twice earned Parade high school soccer All-America recognition. He then attended UCLA and played soccer for the Bruins from 1990 to 1993. During his four seasons with the Bruins, Salcedo 74 games, scored six goals and added seven assists. In 1990, his freshman season, Salcedo scored the decisive penalty kick shootout goal to give the Bruins the NCAA Men's Soccer Championship. He was a 1993 first-team All-American, and graduated with a bachelor's degree in political science.

=== Professional ===
Following his four seasons with the Bruins, Salcedo signed with the Los Angeles Salsa of the American Professional Soccer League. He then moved to Monarcas Morelia of the México Primera División for half a season in 1995. He joined Major League Soccer in 1996. In his rookie season in the league, he was a starter for the Los Angeles Galaxy and helped take his team to the MLS Cup Final. On February 1, 1997, The Galaxy traded him to the Columbus Crew for the first pick in the 1997 Supplemental Draft. On November 6, 1997, the Chicago Fire selected Salcedo with the ninth pick of the Expansion Draft. Halfway through the 1998 season, on June 29, 1998, the Fire traded him to the Tampa Bay Mutiny for Josh Keller and a first-round pick in the 1999 MLS College Draft. On August 13, 1999, the Mutiny traded Salcedo to the Galaxy for Daniel Hernandez. The Galaxy released him during the season and he played two games with the Orange County Zodiac of the USL A-League.

=== International ===
Salcedo was also a member of the US men's national soccer team, earning three caps with the full national team and captaining the U-17 team at the 1989 World Youth Championships and the U-20 team at the 1990 CONCACAF Tournament.

== Coaching career ==
In 2001, Salcedo became an assistant coach with the UCLA Bruins. During his three seasons as an assistant, UCLA won the 2002 NCAA Championship and two Pac-10 championships. In 2002, he spent two short stints as acting head coach. In early 2004, UCLA hired Salcedo to replace Tom Fitzgerald as head coach. Salcedo was named the 2004 Pac-10 Co-Coach of the Year after leading UCLA to its third-straight conference title. In 2006, the Bruins went to NCAA Championship Game where they lost to UC Santa Barbara.

== Arrest and indictment ==
On March 12, 2019, Salcedo was arrested, and indicted by a federal grand jury in Boston for conspiracy to commit racketeering for alleged participation in the 2019 college admissions bribery scandal. His indictment charged Salcedo with taking $200,000 in bribes to help two students, one in 2016 and one in 2018, get admitted to UCLA using falsified soccer credential admission information.

As a result, he was placed on leave by UCLA from his coaching position at the school. On March 21, 2019, it was announced that he had resigned.

On April 21, 2020, it was announced that he had agreed to plead guilty to the charges against him. His plea was accepted on January 14, 2021. On March 19, 2021, U.S. District Court Judge Indira Talwani sentenced Salcedo to 8 months in prison, 1 year of supervised release and a forfeiture of $200,000. Salcedo was imprisoned in the United States Penitentiary, Lompoc, and was released on December 30, 2021.
