= 1990 NCAA Division I men's soccer tournament =

1990 Men's College Cup

Tournament details
- Country: United States
- Venue(s): USF Soccer Stadium; Tampa, Florida
- Teams: 28

Final positions
- Champions: UCLA (2nd title)
- Runners-up: Rutgers
- Semifinalists: Evansville; NC State

Tournament statistics
- Matches played: 27
- Goals scored: 69 (2.56 per match)
- Attendance: 55,096 (2,041 per match)
- Top goal scorer(s): Chad Deering, Indiana (3)

Awards
- Best player: Joe-Max Moore, UCLA (offensive); Brad Friedel, UCLA (defensive)

The 1990 NCAA Division I men's soccer tournament was the 32nd annual tournament organized by the National Collegiate Athletic Association to determine the national champion of men's collegiate soccer among its Division I members in the United States.

UCLA defeated Rutgers in the championship game in a penalty kick shootout (4–3) after the match ended in a 0–0 draw. This was the second title for the Bruins and the first championship game decided by penalty kicks.

The final match was played on December at USF Soccer Stadium in Tampa, Florida. All the other games were played at the home field of the higher seeded team.

== Qualifying ==
Three teams made their debut appearances in the NCAA Division I men's soccer tournament: Illinois State, Richmond, and San Diego.

== Bracket ==
First round
Brooklyn College	0
Adelphi	1
Columbia	2
Seton Hall	0
Dartmouth (pen.)	1
Vermont	1
Boston University	3
Boston College	2
Indiana	5
Wisconsin–Milwaukee	1
Saint Louis	1
George Mason	0
South Carolina	3
Clemson	0
North Carolina	2
Wake Forest	1
Virginia	1
Richmond	0
San Diego	4
Portland	2
Fresno State	2
Santa Clara	1
SMU	2
Illinois State	1

Second round
Rutgers (pen.)	2
Adelphi	2
Columbia	1
Dartmouth	2
Evansville	1
Boston University	0
Indiana	2
Saint Louis	1
NC State	3
South Carolina	1
North Carolina	1
Virginia	3
UCLA	2
San Diego	1
Fresno State	1
SMU	2

Quarterfinals
Rutgers	1
Dartmouth	0
Evansville	1
Indiana	0
NC State (pen.)	1
Virginia	0
UCLA	2
SMU	0

Semifinals
Rutgers	1
Evansville	0
NC State	0
UCLA (2OT, pen.)	1

Championship
Rutgers	0(3)
UCLA (4OT, pen.)	0(4)

== Final ==
December 2, 1990

Rutgers	0–1 (4OT/PK)	UCLA

USF Soccer Stadium, Tampa, Florida
Attendance: 4,613

== See also ==
- 1990 NCAA Division I women's soccer tournament
- 1990 NCAA Division II men's soccer tournament
- 1990 NCAA Division III men's soccer tournament
- 1990 NAIA men's soccer championship
