= UCLA Bruins men's soccer =

American college soccer team

- Founded: 1937; 89 years ago
- University: University of California, Los Angeles
- Head coach: Ryan Jorden (7th season)
- Conference: Big Ten
- Location: Los Angeles, California, US
- Stadium: Wallis Annenberg Stadium (capacity: 3,000)
- Nickname: Bruins
- Colors: Blue and gold
Home	Away

NCAA tournament championships
- 1985, 1990, 1997, 2002

NCAA tournament runner-up
- 1970, 1972, 1973, 2006, 2014

NCAA tournament College Cup
- 1970, 1972, 1973, 1974, 1984, 1985, 1990, 1994, 1997, 1999, 2002, 2006, 2011, 2014

NCAA tournament Quarterfinals
- 1970, 1972, 1973, 1974, 1984, 1985, 1987, 1989, 1990, 1991, 1992, 1994, 1997, 1999, 2002, 2003, 2006, 2009, 2010, 2011, 2014

NCAA tournament Round of 16
- 1977, 1978, 2014

NCAA tournament appearances
- 1954, 1956, 1958, 1959, 1960, 1961, 1963, 1964, 1967, 1968, 1970, 1972, 1973, 1974, 1975, 1977, 1978, 1979, 1980, 1982, 1984, 1985, 1989, 1992, 1993, 1994, 1995, 1996, 1997, 1998, 1999, 2003, 2005, 2008, 2010, 2011, 2012, 2014, 2015, 2016, 2018, 2021, 2024, 2025

Conference tournament championships
- 2025

Conference regular season championships
- 1954, 1956, 1958, 1959, 1960, 1961, 1963, 1964, 1967, 1968, 1970, 1972, 1973, 1974, 1975, 1977, 1979, 1980, 1982, 1984, 1985, 1989, 1992, 1993, 1994, 1995, 1996, 1997, 1998, 1999, 2003, 2005, 2008, 2010, 2011, 2012, 2014, 2015, 2023

The UCLA Bruins men's soccer team is an intercollegiate varsity sports team of the University of California at Los Angeles. The team is a member of the Big Ten Conference of the National Collegiate Athletic Association.

UCLA soccer's main rivals are Stanford, UC Santa Barbara, and California.

== History ==
=== Admissions bribery scandal ===
On March 12, 2019, head coach Jorge Salcedo was arrested, and indicted by a federal grand jury in Boston for conspiracy to commit racketeering for alleged participation in the 2019 college admissions bribery scandal. His indictment charged Salcedo with taking $200,000 in bribes to help two students, one in 2016 and one in 2018, get admitted to UCLA using falsified soccer credential admission information. As a result, he was placed on leave by UCLA from his coaching position at the school. On March 21, 2019, it was announced that he had resigned.

== Stadium ==
From 1969 until 2017 the Bruins played at Frank Marshall Field of Drake Stadium on campus. The stadium is named in honor of Elvin C. "Ducky" Drake, UCLA's long time trainer and former student athlete. Film producer Marshall graduated from UCLA and played on the first NCAA soccer team from 1966-1968.

In 2018, the program moved into the soccer-specific stadium, Wallis Annenberg Stadium, along with the women's soccer program.

== Players ==
=== Current roster ===
As of 11 Sep 2024

Note: Flags indicate national team as defined under FIFA eligibility rules; some limited exceptions apply. Players may hold more than one non-FIFA nationality.

No.	Pos.	Nation	Player
1	GK	USA	Sam Joseph
2	DF	USA	Tre Wright
3	DF	NED	Youri Senden
4	DF	ITA	Pietro Grassi
5	DF	USA	JC Cortez
6	MF	USA	Tarun Karumanchi
7	MF	USA	Edrey Caceres
8	FW	USA	Andre Ochoa
9	FW	ESP	Jose Contell
10	MF	ISL	Sveinn Hauksson
11	MF	USA	Cam Wilkerson
12	MF	USA	Tamir Ratoviz
13	DF	USA	Pablo Greenlee
14	DF	DEN	Philip Naef

No.	Pos.	Nation	Player
15	MF	USA	Amjot Narang
16	MF	USA	Sebastian Rincon
17	FW	USA	Sam Scott
18	GK	USA	Lucca Adams
19	FW	DEN	Nikolai Roje
20	DF	USA	Mateo Pinilla
21	DF	USA	Shakir Nixon
22	GK	USA	Wyatt Nelson
23	FW	USA	Oshea Foster
24	DF	USA	Nicholas Cavallo
25	FW	USA	Allan Legaspi
26	FW	USA	Jacob Diaz
27	FW	UKR	Artem Vovk

=== Notable alumni ===
This list of former players includes those who received international caps, made significant contributions to the team in terms of appearances or goals, or who made significant contributions to the sport after they left. It is clearly not yet complete and all inclusive, and additions and refinements will continue to be made over time.

- (United States) Chad Barrett (2003–2004)
- (United States) Tony Beltran (2006–2007)
- (United States) Carlos Bocanegra (1997–1999)
- (United States) Jonathan Bornstein (2003–2005)
- (United States) Paul Caligiuri (1982–1985)
- (United States) Jimmy Conrad (1996–1997)
- (United States) Dale Ervine (1982–1985)
- (United States) David Estrada (2006–2009)
- (United States) Benny Feilhaber (2003–2005)
- (United States) Brad Friedel (1992–1994)
- (United States) Mike Getchell (1981–1985)
- (United States) Kevin Hartman (1994–1996)
- (United States) Frankie Hejduk (1992–1994)
- (United States) Chris Henderson (1989–1990)
- (United States) Kamani Hill (2004–2006)
- (United States) Chandler Hoffman (2009–2011)
- (United States) Jeff Hooker (1983, 1986–1987)
- (United States) Patrick Ianni (2003–2005)
- (United States) Cobi Jones (1988–1991)
- (United States) Paul Krumpe (1982–1985)
- (United States) Mike Lapper (1988–1991)
- (United States) Eddie Lewis (1992–1995)
- (United States) Frank Marshall (1966–1968)
- (United States) Joe-Max Moore (1989–1992)
- (United States) Chance Myers (2006–2007)
- (United States) Kyle Nakazawa (2006–2009)
- (United States) Amobi Okugo (2009)
- (United States) Ante Razov (1992–1996)
- (United States) Matt Reis (1994–1997)
- (United States) Nick Rimando (1997–1999)
- (United States) Kelyn Rowe (2010–2011)
- (United States) Jorge Salcedo (1990–1993)
- (Germany) Sigi Schmid (1972–1975)
- (Mexico) Sergio Velazquez (1971–1973–1974)
- (United States) Michael Stephens (2006–2009)
- (Germany) Leo Stolz (2012–2014)
- (United States) David Vanole (1981–1985)
- (United States) Peter Vagenas (1996–1999)
- (United States) Sasha Victorine (1996–1999)
- (United States) Marvell Wynne (2004–2005)
- (United States) Sal Zizzo (2005–2006)

== Honours ==
=== National ===
Championship	Titles	Winning years
NCAA Division I Championship	4	1985, 1990, 1997, 2002

=== Conference ===
Conference	Championship	Titles	Winning years
Southern California (Note: "Southern California Soccer Association", independent conference.)	Regular season	14	1954, 1956, 1958, 1959, 1960, 1961, 1963, 1964, 1967, 1968, 1970, 1972, 1973, 1974
(Independent)	Regular season	8	1975, 1977, 1979, 1980, 1982, 1984, 1985, 1989
Mountain Pacific	Tournament	3	1993, 1995, 1996
Mountain Pacific	Regular season	4	1992, 1994, 1997, 1999
Pac-12	Tournament	9	2002, 2003, 2004, 2005, 2008, 2009, 2011, 2012, 2023
Big Ten	Tournament	1	2025

== Seasons ==
Year	Coach	Record		Highlights
Year	Coach	Overall	Conference	Highlights
Southern California Soccer Association
1937	Dan Stevenson	4–5–1	—	
1938	Dan Stevenson	3–4–1	—	
1939	Dan Stevenson	1–6–3	—	
(Team did not play from 1940 to 1947)
1948	Don Drury	2–3–0	—	
1949	Jock Stewart	13–1–0	—	
1950	Jock Stewart	10–2–0	—	
1951	Jock Stewart	4–2–2	—	
1952	Jock Stewart	1–2–0	—	
1953	Jock Stewart	9–5–0	—	
1954	Jock Stewart	7–1–0	—	Conference Champion
1955	Jock Stewart	5–3–0	—	
1956	Jock Stewart	7–2–1	—	Conference Champion
1957	Jock Stewart	7–3–0	—	
1958	Jock Stewart	13–0–0	—	Conference Champion
1959	Jock Stewart	7–0–1	—	Conference Champion
1960	Jock Stewart	10–0–0	—	Conference Champion
1961	Jock Stewart	12–0–1	—	Conference Champion
1962	Jock Stewart	15–2–1	—	
1963	Jock Stewart	18–0–1	—	Conference Champion
1964	Jock Stewart	18–1–1	—	Conference Champion
1965	Jock Stewart	21–2–2	—	
1966	Jock Stewart	17–3–2	—	
1967	Dennis Storer	12–1–1	—	Conference Champion
1968	Dennis Storer	12–2–1	—	Conference Champion
1969	Dennis Storer	14–1–1	—	
1970	Dennis Storer	16–1–0	—	Conference Champion
1970	Dennis Storer	16–1–0	—	NCAA Runner Up
1971	Dennis Storer	18–2–0	—	
1972	Dennis Storer	12–2–3	—	NCAA Runner Up
1973	Dennis Storer	18–1–4	—	NCAA Runner Up
1974	Terry Fisher	15–3–4	—	NCAA Semifinal
1975	Steve Gay	11–6–3	—	
Independent
1976	Steve Gay	13–5–1	—	
1977	Steve Gay	19–5–3	—	
1978	Steve Gay	14–8–1	—	
1979	Steve Gay	15–10–3	—	
1980	Sigi Schmid	18–2–2	—	
1981	Sigi Schmid	12–5–3	—	
1982	Sigi Schmid	16–4–0	—	
1983	Sigi Schmid	17–2–3	—	
1984	Sigi Schmid	19–3–2	—	NCAA Semifinal
1985	Sigi Schmid	20–1–4	—	NCAA Champions
1986	Sigi Schmid	16–1–5	—	
1987	Sigi Schmid	14–7–1	—	NCAA Quarterfinals
1988	Sigi Schmid	13–5–4	—	
1989	Sigi Schmid	18–4–1	—	NCAA Quarterfinals
1990	Sigi Schmid	19–1–4	—	NCAA Champions
1991	Sigi Schmid	18–4–0	—	NCAA Quarterfinals
Mountain Pacific
1992	Sigi Schmid	13–3–3	6–1–0	NCAA Quarterfinals
1993	Sigi Schmid	18–3–0	6–1–0	
1994	Sigi Schmid	18–5–0	6–1–0	NCAA Semifinals
1995	Sigi Schmid	18–3–1	7–0–0	
1996	Sigi Schmid	16–4–0	5–0–0	
1997	Sigi Schmid	22–2–0	4–1–0	NCAA Champions
1998	Sigi Schmid	17–4–0	7–2–0	
1999	Todd Saldana	19–3–0	7–0–0	NCAA Semifinals
2000	Todd Saldana	12–7–0	3–5–0	
2001	Todd Saldana	12–7–4	5–2–1	
2002	Tom Fitzgerald	18–3–3	8–2–0	NCAA Champions
2003	Tom Fitzgerald	20–2–1	10–0–0	NCAA Quarterfinals
2004	Jorge Salcedo	14–4–2	6–2–0	
2005	Jorge Salcedo	12–5–3	7–1–2	
2006	Jorge Salcedo	14–6–4	4–3–3	NCAA Runner Up
2007	Jorge Salcedo	9–9–3	4–4–2	
2008	Jorge Salcedo	10–5–6	7–1–2	
2009	Jorge Salcedo	12–4–4	5–1–4	NCAA Quarterfinals
2010	Jorge Salcedo	16–5–1	8–2–0	NCAA Quarterfinals
Pac-12
2011	Jorge Salcedo	18–5–1	10–0–0	
2012	Jorge Salcedo	12–3–3	7–1–1	Pac-12 Champions
2013	Jorge Salcedo	12–3–5	6–1–3	
2014	Jorge Salcedo	15–5–4	6–2–2	NCAA Runner-up
2015	Jorge Salcedo	11–8–1	5–4–1	NCAA Second Round
2016	Jorge Salcedo	10–8–2	4–5–1	NCAA Second Round
2017	Jorge Salcedo	7–10–1	4–6–0	
2018	Jorge Salcedo	10–9–0	5–5–0	NCAA first round
2019	Ryan Jorden	6–9–3	2–6–2	
2020	Ryan Jorden	3–7–2	2–6–2	
2021	Ryan Jorden	11–7–1	5–4–1	NCAA Second Round
2022	Ryan Jorden	12–7–1	4–4–1	NCAA Third Round
2023	Ryan Jorden	9–4–5	6–0–4	Pac–12 Champions; NCAA Second Round
Big Ten
2024	Ryan Jorden	7–6–6	3–4–3	NCAA First Round
2025	Ryan Jorden	8–6–5	5–3–2	NCAA First Round

- November 16, 2025 – 2025 Big Ten Men’s Soccer Tournament Most Outstanding Player: Sergi Solans Ormo

Source: UCLA Athletics

== Postseason ==
The UCLA Bruins have an NCAA Division I Tournament record of 74–41 through forty-five appearances.

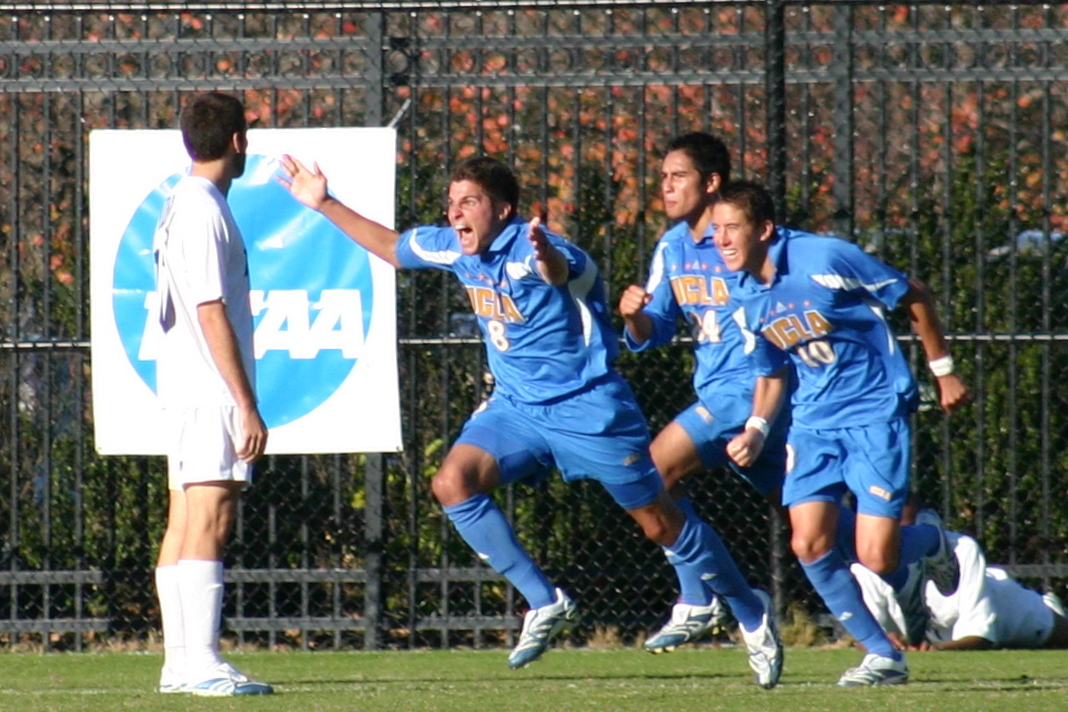
UCLA celebrating a victory over Duke in extra time at the 2006 NCAA Division I men's soccer tournament

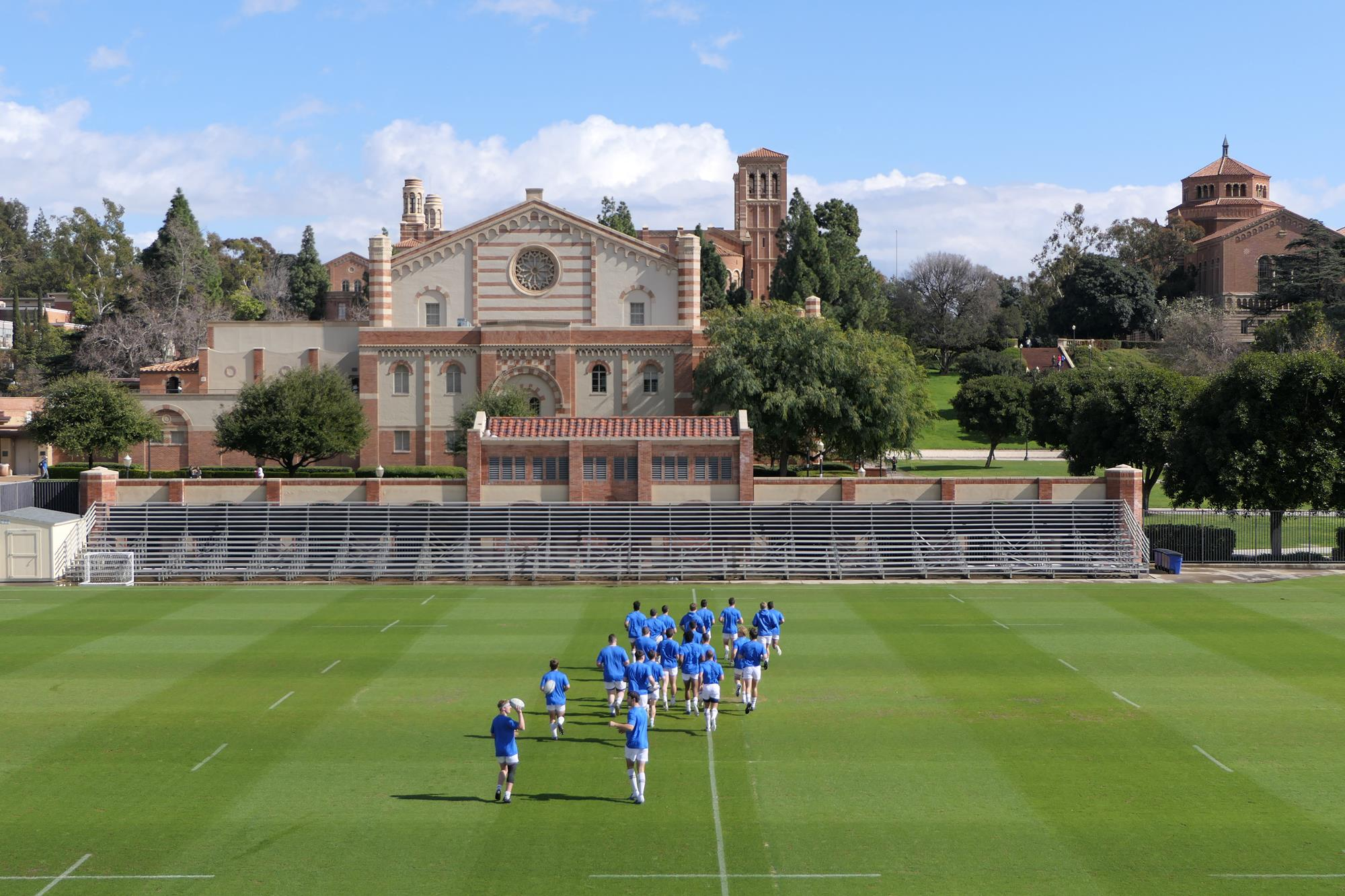
Wallis Annenberg Stadium, UCLA venue

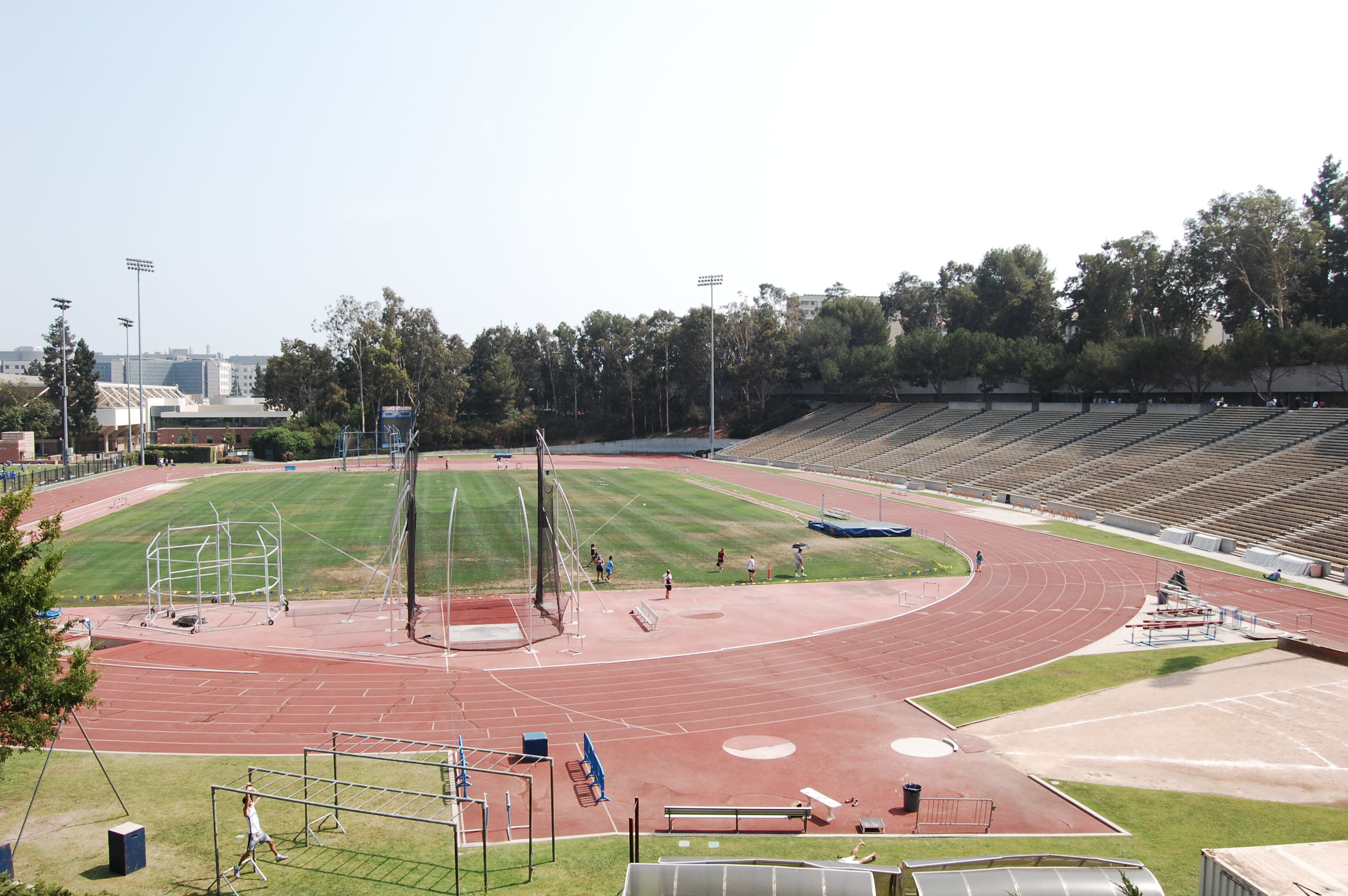
Drake Stadium, the former home field of the soccer teams

Year	Round	Opponent	Result
1968	Second round	San Jose State	L 1–3
1970	Second round Quarterfinals; Semifinals; National Championship	San Francisco; Denver; Howard; Saint Louis	W 3–2; W 3–1; W 4–3; L 0–1
1971	Second round Quarterfinals	Chico State; San Francisco	W 5–1; L 2–6
1972	Second round Quarterfinals; Semifinals; National Championship	Washington; San Jose State; Cornell; Saint Louis	W 5–0; W 3–1; W 1–0; L 2–4
1973	Second round Quarterfinals; Semifinals; National Championship	Washington; San Francisco; Clemson; Saint Louis	W 3–0; W 3–1; W 2–1; L 1–2
1974	Second round Quarterfinals; Semifinals	San Jose State; San Francisco; Saint Louis	W 3–2; W 1–0; L 1–2
1975	Second round	San Francisco	L 1–4
1976	Second round	San Francisco	L 0–1
1977	Second round Quarterfinals	California; San Francisco	W 3–0; L 1–4
1980	Second round	San Francisco	L 1–2
1983	First round	San Francisco	L 0–5
1984	First round Second round Third round Semifinals	Fresno State; San Francisco; Harvard; Clemson	W 2–1; W 1–0; W 2–0; L 1–4
1985	First round Second round Third round Semifinals; National Championship	California; UNLV; SMU; Evansville; American	W 3–1; W 1–0; W 2–0; W 3–1; W 1–0
1986	First round Second round	CSU Fullerton; Fresno State	W 3–0; L 0–1
1987	First round Second round Third round	Fresno State; UNLV; San Diego State	W 1–0; W 1–0; L 1–2
1988	First round Second round	San Diego State; Portland	W 2–1; L 0–2
1989	First round Second round Third round	San Diego State; Portland; Santa Clara	W 2–1; W 1–0; L 0–2
1990	Second round Third round Semifinals; National Championship	San Diego; SMU; NC State; Rutgers	W 2–1; W 2–0; W 1–0; W 1–0
1991	Second round Third round	Portland; Santa Clara	W 3–0; L 1–2
1992	Second round	San Diego	L 1–2
1993	First round	San Diego	L 2–4
1994	First round Second round Third round Semifinals	UAB; SMU; Charleston; Indiana	W 3–2; W 4–2; W 3–2; L 1–4
1995	First round Second round	Cal Poly; Santa Clara	W 2–1; L 1–2
1996	First round	CSU Fullerton	L 1–2
1997	First round Second round Third round Semifinals; National Championship	Santa Clara; Washington; Clemson; Indiana; Virginia	W 3–0; W 1–0; W 2–1; W 1–0; W 2–0
1998	First round Second round	Fresno State; Creighton	W 2–1; L 0–2
1999	First round Second round Third round Semifinals	San Diego; Saint Louis; Virginia; Indiana	W 4–1; W 2–0; W 2–0; L 2–3
2000	First round	San Diego	L 0–1
2001	First round Second round Third round	Loyola Marymount; San Diego; SMU	W 3–2; W 4–0; L 0–1
2002	Second round Third round Quarterfinals; Semifinals; National Championship	Loyola Marymount; California; Penn State; Maryland; Stanford	W 4–2; W 3–2; W 7–1; W 2–1; W 1–0
2003	Second round Third round Quarterfinals	Tulsa; FIU; Indiana	W 3–2; W 2–0; L 1–2
2004	Second round Third round	Loyola Marymount; St. John's	W 3–0; L 1–2
2005	Second round	SMU	L 0–3
2006	Second round Third round Quarterfinals; Semifinals; National Championship	Harvard; Clemson; Duke; Virginia; UC Santa Barbara	W 3–0; W 3–0; W 3–2; W 4–0; L 1–2
2007	First round Second round	New Mexico; Santa Clara	W 1–0; L 1–3
2008	First round	Cal Poly	L 0–1
2009	Second round Third round Quarterfinals	Sacramento State; UC Santa Barbara; Wake Forest	W 2–1; W 2–1; L 0–2
2010	Second round Third round Quarterfinals	Sacramento State; Dartmouth; Louisville	W 4–1; W 2–1; L 4–5
2011	Second round Third round Quarterfinals; Semifinals	Delaware; Rutgers; Louisville; North Carolina	W 1–0; W 3–0; W 1–0; L 2–3
2012	Second round	San Diego	L 2–5
2013	Second round Third round	Elon; Connecticut	W 4–0; L 3–4
2014	Second round Third round Quarterfinals; Semifinals; National Championship	San Diego; California; North Carolina; Providence; Virginia	W 2–1; W 3–2; W 4–3; W 3–2; L 0–1
2015	First round Second round	Cal Poly; Seattle	W 2–0; L 0–1
2016	First round Second round	Colgate; Louisville	W 4–2; L 1–2
2018	First round	Portland	L 0–1
2021	First round Second round	UC Santa Barbara; Duke	W 2–1; L 1–2
2022	First round Second round Third round	Cal Baptist; Clemson; Vermont	W 2–1; W 2–1; L 0–3
2023	First round	Loyola Marymount	L 0–1
2024	First round	UC Santa Barbara	L 0–1
2025	First round	Grand Canyon	L 0–0 (1–3 p)
