= 2005 NCAA Division II men's soccer tournament =

2005 NCAA Division II Men's Soccer Championship
Tournament details
- Country: United States
- Teams: 24

Final positions
- Champions: Fort Lewis (1st title, 2nd final)
- Runners-up: Franklin Pierce (1st final)

Tournament statistics
- Matches played: 23
- Goals scored: 73 (3.17 per match)

Awards
- Best player: Offense: John Cunliffe, Fort Lewis; Defense: Bryan Eisenbraun, Fort Lewis

The 2005 NCAA Division II Men's Soccer Championship was the 34th annual tournament held by the NCAA to determine the top men's Division II college soccer program in the United States.

Early in the second half of the championship final Franklin Pierce striker, Chris Joyce, netted the ninth goal of his postseason career, which set a new Div. II tournament record for a single player. In the match's final 10 minutes, a pair of Fort Lewis goals broke a one-one tie, and the undefeated Skyhawks (22-0-1) vanquished the Franklin Pierce Ravens, 3–1. It marked the tenth time a team finished a Div. II season without a loss. The final and semi-finals were played at the Midwestern State University Soccer Field in Wichita Falls, Texas.

This was the first national title and second finals appearance for the Skyhawks, who were coached by Jeremy Gunn.

== Bracket ==
First round *Campus sites
UNC Pembroke	1(2)
Lander	1(4)
Lynn	7
Cent Arkansas	1
Seattle Pacific	2
Sonoma State	0
Colorado Mines	1(PKs)
Incarnate Word	1
Catawba	2
Tusculum	1
Truman State	1
Rockhurst	0
*	Franklin Pierce	5
Le Moyne	0
NYIT	1
Slippery Rock	0

Second round *Campus sites
*	Clayton State	0
Lander	1
*	Saint Leo	1
Lynn	3
*	CSU Dominguez Hills	2(OT)
Seattle Pacific	1
*	Fort Lewis	1
Colorado Mines	0
*	Carson–Newman	2(PKs)
Catawba	2
*	SIU Edwardsville	0(4)
Truman State	0(2)
Dominican (NY)	0
*	Franklin Pierce	1(OT)
*	Dowling	2
NYIT	2(PKs)

Third round *Campus sites
Lander	0
*	Lynn	8
CSU Dominguez Hills	2
*	Fort Lewis	3
Carson-Newman	0
*	SIU Edwardsville	1
*	Franklin Pierce	1(PKs)
NYIT	1

Semifinals; December 2 Wichita Falls, TX
Lynn	4
Fort Lewis	6
SIU Edwardsville	0
Franklin Pierce	1

Final; December 4 Wichita Falls, TX
Fort Lewis	3
Franklin Pierce	1

== Final ==
December 4, 2005
12:00 CST (UTC−5)

Fort Lewis	3–1	Franklin Pierce
Cliff Wilmes 26:45' (Hall); Ben Gantenbein 81:21' (Cunliffe); Cole Sweetser 89:57' (Cunliffe)	Report 1 Report 2	Chris Joyce 47:25'; Michael Vitulano (yellow card) (yellow-red card) 82'

MSU Soccer Field, Wichita Falls, Texas
Attendance: 538

== See also ==
- NCAA Division I Men's Soccer Championship
- NCAA Division III Men's Soccer Championship
- NAIA Men's Soccer Championship
