= 2003 NCAA Division II men's soccer tournament =

2003 NCAA Division II Men's Soccer Championship
Tournament details
- Country: United States
- Teams: 24

Final positions
- Champions: Lynn (1st title, 2nd final)
- Runners-up: Chico State (1st final)

Tournament statistics
- Matches played: 23
- Goals scored: 62 (2.7 per match)

Awards
- Best player: Offense: Andy Hirst, Lynn Univ. Defense: Ross Lumsden, Lynn Univ.

The 2003 NCAA Division II Men's Soccer Championship was the 32nd annual tournament held by the NCAA to determine the top men's Division II college soccer program in the United States.

On the strength of Leon Jackson's late 2nd half goal Lynn (20-0-1) defeated Chico State in the tournament final, 2–1. The final and semi-finals were played at the Virginia Beach Sportsplex in Virginia Beach, Virginia

This was the first national title for the Fighting Knights, who were coached by Shaun Pendleton, and had previously been finalists in 1997.

== Bracket ==
First Round; Campus sites
SIU Edwardsville	1(5)
Rockhurst	1(3)
Findlay	1(4)
Ashland	1(2)
Chico State	2
UC San Diego	0
Midwestern State	2
Northeastern State	0
UNC Pembroke	1(3)
Carson–Newman	1(4)
Barry	1
Rollins	2
Mass-Lowell	3
Franklin Pierce	0
NYIT	1
East Stroudsburg	2

Second Round; *Campus sites
*	Truman State	5
SIU Edwardsville	2
*	Mercyhurst	0(3)
Findlay	0(5)
*	CSU Dominguez Hills	1
Chico State	2
*	Incarnate Word	1
Midwestern State	2
*	USC Spartanburg	1(3)
Carson–Newman	1(4)
*	Lynn	2
Rollins	1
*	Southern Conn.	0
Mass-Lowell	1
*	Dowling	2
East Stroudsburg	0

Quarterfinals; *Campus sites
*	Truman State	1
Findlay	2
Chico State	3
*	Midwestern State	1
Carson–Newman	0
*	Lynn	3
Mass-Lowell	0
*	Dowling	2

Semifinals; December 5 Virginia Beach, VA
Findlay	0
Chico State	2
Lynn	3
Dowling	2

Final; December 7 Virginia Beach, VA
Chico State	1
Lynn	2

== Final ==
December 7, 2003
1:00 EST (UTC−5)

Lynn	2–1	Chico State
Fernando Villalobos 3:55' (Hirst, Melling); Leon Jackson 79:02' (Dunkerley)	Report 1 Report 2	Jesse Grigg 36:09'

Virginia Beach Sportsplex, Virginia Beach, Virginia
Attendance: 198

== See also ==
- NCAA Division I Men's Soccer Championship
- NCAA Division III Men's Soccer Championship
- NAIA Men's Soccer Championship
