= 2001 NCAA Division II men's soccer tournament =

2001 NCAA Division II Men's Soccer Championship
Tournament details
- Country: United States
- Teams: 16

Final positions
- Champions: Tampa (3rd title, 5th final)
- Runners-up: Cal State Dominguez Hills (2nd final)

Tournament statistics
- Matches played: 15
- Goals scored: 35 (2.33 per match)
- Attendance: 6,165 (411 per match)
- Top goal scorer(s): Marcus Rullow, West Texas A&M; Sean Lockhart, Cal State Dominguez Hills; Roy Fink, Tampa; Jason Bell, Tampa; Jaime Creaghan, Lander; Justin McMillian, SIU Edwardsville

Awards
- Best player: Offense: Kareem Escayg, Tampa; Defense: Luis Morales, CSU Dominguez Hills
- All statistics correct as of 12/26/2019.

The 2001 NCAA Division II Men's Soccer Championship was the 30th annual tournament held by the NCAA to determine the top men's Division II college soccer program in the United States.

Tampa (19-0-2) defeated defending champions Cal State Dominguez Hills in the tournament final, 2–1.

This was the third national title for the Spartans, who were coached by Keith Fulk.

== Bracket ==
First Round; *Campus sites
*	West Texas A&M	4
Fort Lewis	0
*	CSU Dominguez Hills	1
CSU Bakersfield	0
*	Southern Conn.	1
Saint Anselm	0
*	Dowling	2
East Stroudsburg	0
*	Tampa	2
Lynn	1
*	Clayton State	1
Lander	2(OT)
*	Lewis (IL)	0
SIU Edwardsville	2
*	Mercyhurst	1
Ashland	2

Quarterfinals; *Campus sites
*	West Texas A&M	0
CSU Dominguez Hills	2
*	Southern Conn.	1
Dowling	2(3OT)
*	Tampa	2
Lander	1
*	SIU Edwardsville	1
Ashland	0

Semifinals; *Campus sites
*	CSU Dominguez Hills	1(OT)
Dowling	0
*	Tampa	2(OT)
SIU Edwardsville	1

Final; December 2 Tampa, FL
CSU Dominguez Hills	1
*	Tampa	2

== Final ==
December 2, 2001
13:00 EST (UTC−5)

Tampa	2–1	Cal State Dominguez Hills
Jason Bell 80:02' (Huettich); Kareem Escayg 86:20'; Erol Belli (yellow card)	Report	Joe Cartlidge 1:19' (Lockhart); Eddie Gonzalez-Pinto (yellow card) bench (yellow card); Silveri (yellow card)

Pepin-Rood Stadium, Tampa, Florida
Attendance: 1,236

== See also ==
- NCAA Division I Men's Soccer Championship
- NCAA Division III Men's Soccer Championship
- NAIA Men's Soccer Championship
