= Southern Connecticut Owls men's soccer =

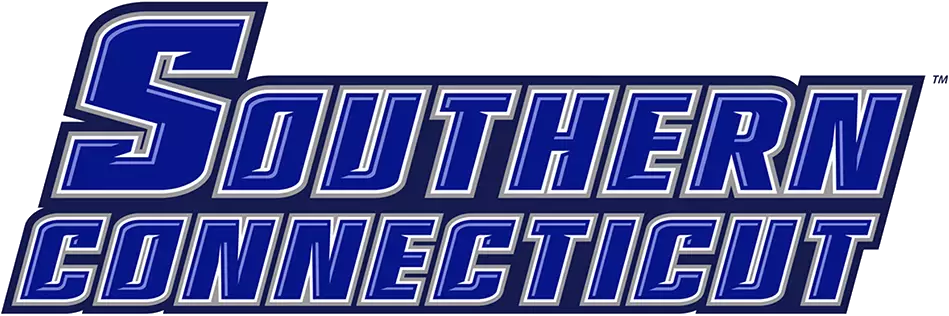
- Founded: 1968; 58 years ago
- University: Southern Connecticut State University
- Head coach: Kevin Anderson (3rd. season)
- Conference: Northeast-10; II Division
- Location: New Haven, Connecticut, US
- Stadium: Jess Dow Field (capacity: 6,000)
- Nickname: Owls
- Colors: Blue and white
Home	Away

NCAA tournament championships
- 1987, 1990, 1992, 1995, 1998, 1999

Conference tournament championships
- 1982, 1983, 1985, 1986, 1988, 1989, 1990, 1992, 1993, 1994, 1996, 1997, 1998, 1999, 2000, 2001, 2002, 2003, 2004

The Southern Connecticut Owls men's soccer is the intercollegiate varsity soccer team representing the Southern Connecticut State University (SCSU), located in New Haven, Connecticut. The team is a member of the Northeast-10 Conference athletic conference of NCAA Division II.

The Owls' current head coach is Kevin Anderson, who is in charge since 2023. The team play their home matches at Jess Dow Field, a multi-purpose stadium inaugurated in 1988 which also serves as home venue to the football, lacrosse, field hockey, and track and field teams.

Established in 1968, the SCSU soccer program has won six NCAA championships, being the most winning team in D-II. SCSU also have won 14 New England Collegiate Conference titles. The program has a long record of developing students with difficult backgrounds and molding them into respectable adults.

== Players ==
=== Current roster ===
As of December 2025 Note: Flags indicate national team as defined under FIFA eligibility rules; some limited exceptions apply. Players may hold more than one non-FIFA nationality.

No.	Pos.	Nation	Player
0	GK	USA	Jameson Benben
1	GK	ESP	Hector Diez
2	DF	USA	Yussif Mohammed
3	DF	USA	Tyler Doherty
4	DF	LBR	Jah Nyanforh
5	DF	GHA	Edward Mensah
6	MF	GHA	Solomon Aidoo
7	MF	FRA	Jeremy Martin
9	FW	ESP	Ferran Briones
10	MF	HUN	Samuel Nagy
11	MF	USA	Amos Bignotti
12	DF	USA	David Lops
13	MF	USA	Ian Poitras

No.	Pos.	Nation	Player
14	FW	USA	Jake Novoshelski
15	MF	FRA	Ryad Benmessaoud
16	MF	USA	Kasper Murzinski
17	MF	NOR	Mats Christensen
18	MF	USA	Randy Vang
19	FW	USA	Jelique Panton
20	DF	USA	Kazuki Amegavie
21	FW	USA	Jayson Dumont
22	DF	USA	Elliott Matthews
23	FW	USA	Giancarlo Ciotoli
24	DF	SUI	Cameron Conley
25	DF	USA	Jamari Carvalho
30	GK	USA	Diego Flores

== Records ==
key

- – member of the SCSU Athletics Hall of Fame
- – member of the Connecticut Soccer Hall of Fame

Top scorers

#	Nat.	Player	Goals	Tenure
1	(United States)	Ron Basile	57	1980-83
1	(Canada)	Olivier Occéan	57	2001–03
2	(United States)	Antony Vaughn	54	1986–89
3		Renwick Hutson	53	1995–98
4	(United States)	Gil Hokayma	50	1992–95
5	(Barbados)	Sherwin Mullin	45	1992–95

Most assistances

#	Nat.	Player	Assist.	Tenure
1	(Israel)	Assaf Dagai	55	1996–99
2		Itai Mor	47	1994–97
3		Yohannes Tesema	34	1987–90
4	(United States)	John DeBrito	32	1987–90
5		Ron Basile		1980–83

== Players in the pros ==
SCSU players that play/have played at professional levels are:

- (United States) Kevin Anderson (1991–92)
- (United States) John Ball (1992–95)
- (United States) Brian Bliss (1983–86)
- (Argentina) Cristian da Silva (1990–93)
- (United States) John DeBrito (1987–90)
- (Trinidad and Tobago) Ancil Farrier (1987–90)
- (United States) Chris Houser (1995–97)
- (Haiti) Gilbert Jean-Baptiste (1996–98)
- (Kenya) Bonaventure Maruti (2000)
- (Canada) Olivier Occéan (2001–03)
- (Canada) Andrew Olivieri (1999–02)
- (United States) Bo Oshoniyi (1990–93)
- (Colombia) Juan Carlos Osorio (1988)
- (Kenya) Paul Oyuga (1998–00)
- (United States) Mike Petke (1994–97)
- (United States) Ray Reid (1980–82)
- (United States) Jordan Russolillo (2002–05)
- (United States) Elias Zurita (1983–87)

== Coaches ==
=== Current staff ===
As of 22 December 2025

Position	Name
Head coach	Kevin Anderson
Assist. coach	Reuben Ayarna
Assist. coach	Ed Kelly
Assist. coach	Chris Payne
Assist. coach	Nico Longo

=== Coaching history ===
As of December 2025

#	Name	Seas.	Rec.	Tenure
1	Bob Dikranian	21	229–92–31	1968–88
2	Ray Reid	8	146–17–15	1989–96
3	Tom Lang	25	307–117–55	1997–22
4	Kevin Anderson	3	n/a	2023–present

== Titles ==
=== National ===
Championship	Titles	Winning years
NCAA D-II tournament	6	1987, 1990, 1992, 1995, 1998, 1999

=== Conference ===
Conference	Championship	Titles	Winning years
New England	Regular season	14	1982, 1983, 1985, 1986, 1988, 1989, 1990, 1992, 1993, 1994, 1996, 1997, 1998, 1999
Northeast-10	Regular season	5	2000, 2001, 2002, 2003, 2004

== Team statistics ==
=== Records ===
Statistic	Number	Year	Additional info
Most wins (in a season)	22	1990	22–0–1 (season record)
Most goals scored (in a game)	12	2001	vs Saint Rose
Most goals scored (in a season)	94	1990	22–0–1 (season record)
Fewest goals allowed (in a season)	0.34 (avg)	1996	20–1–1 (season record)
Longest winning streak (conference)	21		Oct 1997 – Sep 2000
Longest unbeaten streak (conference)	46		Oct 1995 – Oct 2000

=== NCAA appearances ===
Southern Connecticut's appearances in NCAA D-II tournament are listed below:

Key

- a.e.t. – Match went to extra time
- p – Match decided by a penalty shootout after extra time

Season	Stage	Rival	Res.	Score
1978	Semifinals	Seattle Pacific	L	0–1 (a.e.t.)
1979	Semifinals	Eastern Illinois	L	0–1
1980	Third place	Chico State	W	2–1 (a.e.t.)
1981	Third place	UMSL	W	3–1
1982	Runner-up	FIU	L	1–2
1987	Champion	Cal State Northridge	W	2–0
1990	Champion	Seattle Pacific	W	0–0 (4–3 p)
1992	Champion	Tampa	W	1–0 (a.e.t.)
1993	Runner-up	Seattle Pacific	L	0–1
1994	Semifinals	Tampa	L	0–0 (4–5 p)
1995	Champion	USC Upstate	L	0–2
1996	Semifinals	Oakland	L	0–1
1998	Champion	USC Spartanburg	W	1–0
1999	Champion	Fort Lewis	W	2–1 (a.e.t.)
