= 2004 NCAA Division II men's soccer tournament =

2004 NCAA Division II Men's Soccer Championship
Tournament details
- Country: United States
- Teams: 24

Final positions
- Champions: Seattle (1st title, 1st final)
- Runners-up: SIU Edwardsville (4th final)

Tournament statistics
- Matches played: 23
- Goals scored: 63 (2.74 per match)

Awards
- Best player: Offense: Bobby McAlister, Seattle; Defense: Santa Maria Rivera, Seattle

The 2004 NCAA Division II Men's Soccer Championship was the 33rd annual tournament held by the NCAA to determine the top men's Division II college soccer program in the United States.

Bobby McAlister's 70th minute goal broke a one-one tie and Seattle (22-0-1) defeated SIU Edwardsville in the tournament final, 2–1. It marked the ninth time a team finished a Div. II season without a loss. McAlister was named the offensive MVP of the Final Four. The final and semi-finals were played at the Midwestern State University Soccer Field in Wichita Falls, Texas.

This was the first national title for the Redhawks, who were coached by Pete Fewing.

== Bracket ==
First Round; *Campus sites
Lewis	0(1)
Wisc. Parkside	0(3)
Tusculum	5(OT)
Catawba	4
*	Rollins	1(OT)
Montevallo	0
Queens (NC)	0(3)
Clayton State	0(4)
CSU Dominguez Hills	0(4)
CSU Bakersfield	0(5)
Fort Lewis	2
Northeastern State	1
Franklin Pierce	3
Mass-Lowell	0
Lock Haven	2(2OT)
California (PA)	1

Second Round; *Campus sites
*	SIU Edwardsville	3
Wisc. Parkside	1
Carson–Newman	0
*	Tusculum	3
Cent Arkansas	2
*	Rollins	1
*	UNC Pembroke	2
Clayton State	0
*	Seattle	3
CSU Bakersfield	0
*	Incarnate Word	2
Fort Lewis	0
*	Southern Conn.	2(1)
Franklin Pierce	2(3)
*	Dowling	4
Lock Haven	0

Quarter-finals; *Campus sites
*	SIU Edwardsville	3
Tusculum	2
Cent Arkansas	0
*	UNC Pembroke	1
*	Seattle	1
Incarnate Word	0
Franklin Pierce	0
*	Dowling	1

Semifinals; December 3 Wichita Falls, TX
SIU Edwardsville	4
UNC Pembroke	1
Seattle	2(OT)
Dowling	1

Final; December 5 Wichita Falls, TX
SIU Edwardsville	1
Seattle	2

== Final ==
December 5, 2004
1:00 EST (UTC−5)

Seattle	2–1	SIU Edwardsville
Jacob Besagno (yellow card) 2:39'; Santa Maria Rivera (yellow card) 7:10'; Adam Jenson 43:00' (Weaver, Rivera); Bobby McAlister 69:58'	Report 1 Report 2	Victor Pacheco 48:55'; Mike Banner (yellow card) 61:31'

MSU Soccer Field, Wichita Falls, Texas
Attendance: 550
Referee: Robert Mann

== See also ==
- NCAA Division I Men's Soccer Championship
- NCAA Division III Men's Soccer Championship
- NAIA Men's Soccer Championship
