= 2000 NCAA Division II men's soccer tournament =

2000 NCAA Division II Men's Soccer Championship
Tournament details
- Country: United States
- Teams: 16

Final positions
- Champions: Cal State Dominguez Hills (1st title, 1st final)
- Runners-up: Barry (1st final)

Tournament statistics
- Matches played: 15
- Goals scored: 39 (2.6 per match)
- Attendance: 8,273 (552 per match)
- Top goal scorer(s): Fitzgerald Clarke, Barry

Awards
- Best player: Offense: Victor Guerrero, Cal State Dominguez Hills; Defense: Jacobi Goodfellow, Barry
- All statistics correct as of 11/17/2019.

The 2000 NCAA Division II Men's Soccer Championship was the 29th annual tournament held by the NCAA to determine the top men's Division II college soccer program in the United States.

Cal State Dominguez Hills (23-1-1) defeated hosts Barry, 2–1, in the tournament final, after four overtime periods.

This was the first national title for the Toros, who were coached by Joe Flanagan.

== Bracket ==
First Round; *Campus sites
*	Saint Anselm	0
N.H. College	1
*	Dowling	1(2)
East Stroudsburg	1(3)
*	Francis Marion	1(5)
Clayton State	1(3)
*	Barry	4
Christian Brothers	0
*	Wisconsin–Parkside	0
Lewis (IL)	1
*	Wheeling Jesuit	3
Mercyhurst	2
*	West Texas A&M	1
Metro State	0
*	CSU Dominguez Hills	4
Seattle Pacific	0

Quarterfinals; *Campus sites
N.H. College	2
*	East Stroudsburg	4
Francis Marion	0
*	Barry	3
Lewis (IL)	1
*	Wheeling Jesuit	0
West Texas A&M	0
*	CSU Dominguez Hills	2

Semifinals; *Campus sites
East Stroudsburg	1
*	Barry	2
Lewis (IL)	0
*	CSU Dominguez Hills	1

Final; December 3 Miami Shores, FL
Barry	1
CSU Dominguez Hills	2(4OT)

== Final ==
December 3, 2000
13:00 EST (UTC−5)

Barry	1–2 (4OT)	Cal State Dominguez Hills
Fitzgerald Clarke 29:20' (Chirinos, Marcina); Jacobi Goodfellow (yellow card) 60:02'; Andres Lopez (yellow card) 78:50'; Alen Marcina (yellow card) 81:49'	Report 1 Report 2 Report 3	Victor Guerrero 65:36' (deVocht); Sergio Gutierrez (yellow card) 57:28'; Tony de Vocht (yellow card) 57:28'; Victor Guerrero 138:44' (Lockhart)

Buccaneer Field, Miami Shores, Florida
Attendance: 2,036
Referee: Robert Mann

== See also ==
- NCAA Division I Men's Soccer Championship
- NCAA Division III Men's Soccer Championship
- NAIA Men's Soccer Championship
