= Cal State Bakersfield Roadrunners men's soccer =

American college soccer team

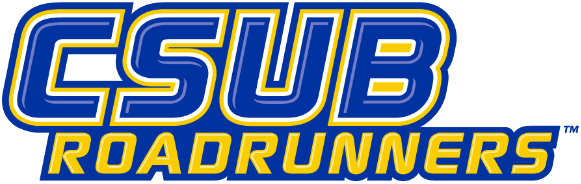
- Founded: 1979; 47 years ago
- University: California State University, Bakersfield
- Head coach: Adam Grant (4th season)
- Conference: Big West
- Location: Bakersfield, California, US
- Stadium: Main Soccer Field (capacity: 2,000)
- Nickname: CSUB, Roadrunners
- Colors: Blue and gold
| Home | Away |

NCAA tournament championships
- 1997 (DII)

NCAA tournament College Cup
- 1995, 1997 (DII)

NCAA tournament Quarterfinals
- 1995, 1997 (DII)

NCAA tournament Round of 16
- 1995, 1997 (DII)

NCAA tournament Round of 32
- 1995, 1997, 2004 (DII)

NCAA tournament appearances
- 2011, 2026 (DI); 1990, 1994, 1995, 1996, 1997, 2001, 2004 (DII)

Conference tournament championships
- 2026 (DI), 2004 (DII)

Conference regular season championships
- 2010, 2011, 2012 (D1) 1990, 1994, 1995, 1997 (DII)

The Cal State Bakersfield Roadrunners men's soccer team represents California State University, Bakersfield in all NCAA Division I men's college soccer competitions. The Roadrunners play in the Big West Conference. They won their very first Big West championship in men's soccer in 2026, defeating UC Santa Barbara Gauchos men's soccer 5–1.

== Roster ==
As of November 2026

Note: Flags indicate national team as defined under FIFA eligibility rules; some limited exceptions apply. Players may hold more than one non-FIFA nationality.

| No. | Pos. | Nation | Player |
|---|---|---|---|
| 0 | GK | USA | Juan Mendez |
| 1 | GK | AUS | Zenden Hart |
| 2 | DF | CAN | Nikola Kostic |
| 3 | DF | USA | Armon Haghighat |
| 4 | DF | MEX | Ulisse Alberti |
| 5 | DF | AUS | Jackson Chambers |
| 6 | DF | ISR | Raz Yehezkel |
| 7 | FW | USA | Joey Velasquez |
| 8 | MF | SUI | Jakob Löpping |
| 9 | FW | GER | Nils Heinrich |
| 10 | MF | ENG | Jesse Wangusi |
| 11 | FW | AUS | Lorimer Bouman |
| 12 | FW | USA | Justin Knighton |
| 13 | DF | USA | Khaelan Manuel-Zeitlin |

| No. | Pos. | Nation | Player |
|---|---|---|---|
| 14 | MF | SUI | Jacob Bernauer |
| 15 | MF | USA | Kevin Rodriguez |
| 16 | DF | NOR | Filip Arras |
| 17 | MF | USA | Kevin Estrada |
| 19 | DF | AUS | Curtis Miley |
| 20 | MF | USA | Dakotah Medina |
| 21 | FW | USA | Mpawenayo Jackson |
| 23 | FW | USA | Oshea Foster |
| 24 | MF | USA | Charlie Cazares |
| 25 | FW | USA | Chisom Ene |
| 26 | MF | USA | Josh Robinson |
| 27 | DF | USA | Javier Villatoro |
| 28 | DF | USA | Ivan Bustos |
| 30 | GK | USA | Diego Ramirez |

== Coaches ==
=== Current staff ===
As of November, 2026

| Name | Pos. | Consec. |
|---|---|---|
| Adam Grant | Head coach | 6th |
| Ethan Keough | Assistant Coach | 3rd |
| Carlos Armendariz | Assistant Coach | 4th |

=== Coaching records ===
| Coach | Years | Overall | | Conference | |
| Coach | Years | Record | Pct. | Record | Pct. |
|---|---|---|---|---|---|
| Pepe Ortega | 1979–80 | 1–22–0 | .043 | 0–10–0 | .000 |
| Dave Atkinson | 1981–86 | 13–80–6 | .162 | 1–59–2 | .032 |
| Simon Tobin | 1997–2013 | 305–188–52 | .607 | 99–95–28 | .509 |
| Richie Grant | 2013–2022 | 50-83-16 | .389 | 29-43-8 | .413 |
| Adam Grant | 2023- | 24-26-19 | .451 | 11-12-10 | .482 |
| Total | | 386-395–86 | .495 | 139-218–44 | .485 |

== Postseason ==
=== NCAA Division I Tournament results ===
CSUB has appeared in one NCAA Division Tournaments. Their record is 0–1–0.

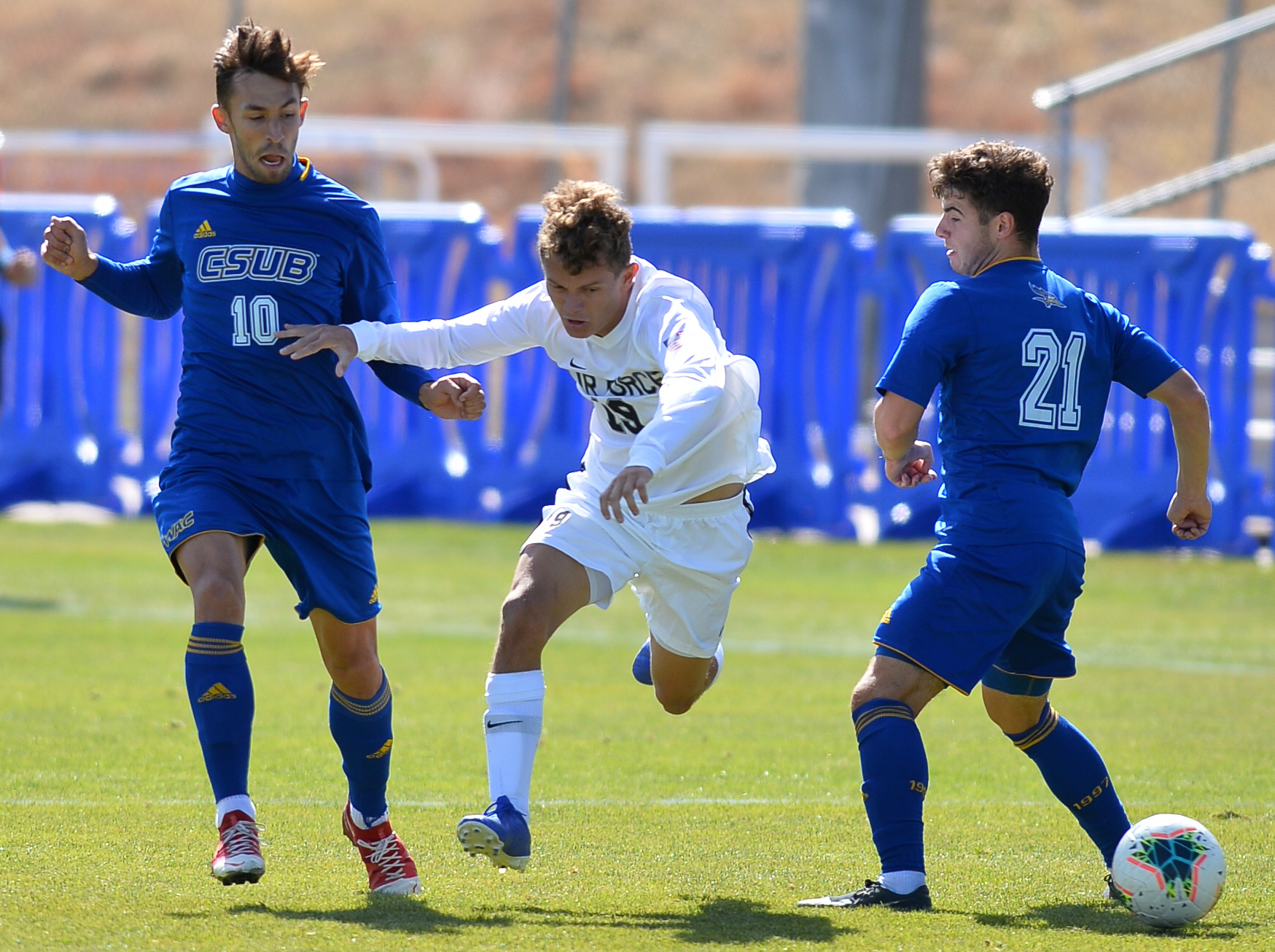
Cal State Bakersfield vs Air Force in 2019

| Year | Round | Rival | Result |
|---|---|---|---|
| 2011 | First round | St. Mary's (CA) | L 0–1 |

=== NCAA Division II Tournament results ===
CSUB has appeared in seven NCAA Division II Tournaments. Their record is 4–5–2.

| Year | Round | Rival | Result |
|---|---|---|---|
| 1990 | First round | Sonoma State | L 2–3 ^{2OT} |
| 1994 | Second round | Seattle Pacific | T 2–2 ^{PK} |
| 1995 | Second round Semifinals | Grand Canyon; Southern Connecticut | L 1–2 ^{3OT} |
| 1996 | First round | Seattle Pacific | L 0–2 |
| 1997 | First round Second round Semifinals; Final | West Texas A&M; Seattle Pacific; Truman; Lynn | W 3–2 ^{4OT} W 4–3 ^{4OT} W 2–0; W 1–0 |
| 2001 | First round | CSU Dominguez Hills | L 0–1 |
| 2004 | First round Second round | CSU Dominguez Hills; Seattle Pacific | T 0–0 ^{PK} L 0–3 |

== Championships ==
=== National championships ===
- NCAA tournament (1): 1997

== Rivalries ==
CSUB's primary rival during its Division II era was CSU Dominguez Hills.

== See also ==
- Cal State Bakersfield Roadrunners women's soccer
