= 1996 NCAA Division II men's soccer tournament =

1996 NCAA Division II Men's Soccer Championship
Tournament details
- Country: United States
- Teams: 12

Final positions
- Champions: Grand Canyon (1st title, 1st final)
- Runners-up: Oakland (3rd final)

Tournament statistics
- Matches played: 11
- Goals scored: 31 (2.82 per match)
- Attendance: 8,679 (789 per match)
- Top goal scorer(s): Nabyl Bekraoui, Grand Canyon (2); Dylan Kendrick, Lynn (2); Milos Tomic, Grand Canyon (3)
- All statistics correct as of 11/3/2019.

The 1996 NCAA Division II Men's Soccer Championship was the 25th annual tournament held by the NCAA to determine the top men's Division II college soccer program in the United States.

Grand Canyon (12-4-5) defeated Oakland, 3–1, in the tournament final.

This was the first national title for the Antelopes, who were co-coached by Peter Duah and Petar Draksin.

== Bracket ==
First Round; *Campus sites
Lander	0
*	Tampa	1
Seattle Pacific	2
*	Cal-St. Bakersfield	0
Franklin Pierce	2
Dowling	3(OT)
Oakland	2
*	W.V. Wesleyan	0

Quarterfinals; *Campus sites
*	Lynn	5
Tampa	3
*	Grand Canyon	2(OT)
Seattle Pacific	1
*	So. Connecticut	3
Dowling	0
*	Mercyhurst	0
Oakland	1(OT)

Semifinals; *Campus sites
Lynn	0
*	Grand Canyon	1
So. Connecticut	0
Oakland	1

Final; December 8 Phoenix, AZ
Grand Canyon	3
Oakland	1

== Final ==
December 8, 1996
13:30 EST (UTC−7)

Grand Canyon	3–1	Oakland
Miloš Tomić 22', 83:45'; Nabyl Bekraoui 88:33'	Report 1 Report 2	Paul Snape 57'

GCU Field, Phoenix, AZ
Attendance: 1,649

== See also ==
- NCAA Division I Men's Soccer Championship
- NCAA Division III Men's Soccer Championship
- NAIA Men's Soccer Championship
