= 1990 NCAA Division II men's soccer tournament =

1990 NCAA Division II Men's Soccer Championship
Tournament details
- Country: United States
- Teams: 12

Final positions
- Champions: Southern Connecticut (2nd)
- Runners-up: Seattle Pacific

Tournament statistics
- Matches played: 11
- Goals scored: 23 (2.09 per match)
- Top goal scorer(s): (United States) Andrew Ziemer, Sonoma State (2)

The 1990 NCAA Division II Men's Soccer Championship was the 19th annual tournament held by the NCAA to determine the top men's Division II college soccer program in the United States.

Southern Connecticut State defeated Seattle Pacific in the final, winning in a penalty kick shootout after the championship match finished 0–0 through four overtime periods. This was the Owls' (22–0–1) second national title and first for coach Ray Reid.

The final match was held in Melbourne, Florida on December 1, 1990.

== Bracket ==
First Round; *Campus sites
Bridgeport	1
N.H. College	0
Oakland	1(4)
NE Missouri State	1(1)
Sonoma State	3(2OT)
Cal State Bakersfield	2
*	Tampa	0
Florida Tech	1

Quarterfinals; *Campus sites
*	So. Connecticut St	2(2OT)
Bridgeport	1
*	Gannon	2
Oakland	1
*	Seattle Pacific	1
Sonoma State	0
*	UNC Greensboro	1
Florida Tech	2

Semifinals; *Campus sites
So. Connecticut St	1
Gannon	0
Seattle Pacific	2
Florida Tech	1

Final; December 8 Melbourne, FL
So. Connecticut St	0(4)
Seattle Pacific	0(3)

== Final ==
December 1, 1990

Southern Connecticut State	0–0* (a.e.t.)	Seattle Pacific
	Report
Penalties
Henrik Svarthborn (penalty scored); John DeBrito (penalty scored); Larry Pituro (penalty scored) (penalty missed) (penalty missed); Nick Booth (penalty scored)	4–3	(penalty scored) Mark Kovates; (penalty scored) Dion Earl; (penalty scored) Brian Meier (penalty missed) (penalty missed); (penalty missed) Robin Malmangers

FIT Varsity Field, Melbourne, Florida
Attendance: 700

== See also ==
- NCAA Division I Men's Soccer Championship
- NCAA Division III Men's Soccer Championship
- NAIA Men's Soccer Championship
