= 1988 NCAA Division II men's soccer tournament =

1988 NCAA Division II Men's Soccer Championship
Tournament details
- Country: United States
- Teams: 12

Final positions
- Champions: Florida Tech (1st title)
- Runners-up: Cal State Northridge

Tournament statistics
- Matches played: 11
- Goals scored: 30 (2.73 per match)
- Top goal scorer(s): (United States) B Reyes, CSUN (5)

Awards
- Best player: Offense: (Malaysia) R Chan (FIT); Defense: (United States) R Iversen (CSUN)

The 1988 NCAA Division II Men's Soccer Championship was the 17th annual tournament held by the NCAA to determine the top men's Division II college soccer program in the United States.

Florida Tech defeated Cal State Northridge in the final, 3–2, to win their first Division II national title. The Panthers (15-6) were coached by Rick Stottler.

The final match was played on December 4 in Northridge, California.

== Bracket ==
First Round; *Campus sites
* | S. Conn. State | 2
Bridgeport | 0
* | Tampa | 1
Gannon | 3
* | UM–Saint Louis | 1
Lock Haven | 0
* | Cal State Northridge | 2
UW–Green Bay | 1

Quarterfinals; *Campus sites
New Hampshire College | 0
* | S. Conn. State | 1
* | Florida Tech | 1
Gannon | 0
* | Oakland | 3
UM–Saint Louis | 0
* | Seattle Pacific | 2
Cal State Northridge | 3(OT)

Semifinals; *Campus sites
S. Conn. State | 0
Florida Tech | 1
Oakland | 1
* | Cal State Northridge | 3

Final; December 4 Northridge, CA
Florida Tech | 3
Cal State Northridge | 2

== Final ==
December 4, 1988

| Cal State Northridge | 2–3 | Florida Tech |
|---|---|---|
| Scott Piri 17:39'; Rick Iversen 44:21' (pen.) | Report | Fitzgerald Haig 15:36'; Robin Chan 25:46'; Edward Grosso 47:11' (Freeman) |

North Campus Stadium, Northridge, CA
Attendance: 4,588

== See also ==
- NCAA Division I Men's Soccer Championship
- NCAA Division III Men's Soccer Championship
- NAIA Men's Soccer Championship
