= 1999 NCAA Division II men's soccer tournament =

1999 NCAA Division II Men's Soccer Championship
Tournament details
- Country: United States
- Teams: 16

Final positions
- Champions: Southern Connecticut (6th title, 8th final)
- Runners-up: Fort Lewis (1st final)

Tournament statistics
- Matches played: 15
- Goals scored: 42 (2.8 per match)
- Attendance: 8,925 (595 per match)
- Top goal scorer(s): Paul Oyuga, Southern Conn. (3); Per Ole Tenden, Charleston (WV) (3); Avi Scabini, Southern Conn. (2)

Awards
- Best player: T.J. Delucia, Southern Conn. (Defense); Brad Greenwood, Fort Lewis (Offense)
- All statistics correct as of 11/16/2019.

The 1999 NCAA Division II Men's Soccer Championship was the 28th annual tournament held by the NCAA to determine the top men's Division II college soccer program in the United States.

Undefeated defending champions Southern Connecticut State (20-0) defeated Fort Lewis, 2–1, in the tournament final, after two overtime periods. This was the second consecutive and sixth overall national title for the Owls, who were coached by Tom Lang.

== Bracket ==
First Round; *Campus sites
*	Southern Conn.	2
N.H. College	0
*	Southampton	2(3OT)
East Stroudsburg	1
*	Truman State	2
IPFW	3(OT)
*	Charleston (WV)	3
W.V. Wesleyan	1
*	Lynn	0
Barry	1(OT)
*	Wingate	0
Queens (NC)	2
*	Fort Lewis	1(PK)
St. Edward's (TX)	1
*	Seattle Pacific	0
UC Davis	1

Quarterfinals; *Campus sites
*	Southern Conn.	3(4OT)
Southampton	2
IPFW	0
*	Charleston (WV)	5
*	Barry	2
Queens (NC)	1
*	Fort Lewis	2
UC Davis	1

Semifinals; *Campus sites
Southern Conn.	1
Charleston (WV)	0
Barry	0
Fort Lewis	2

Final; December 5 Miami Shores, FL
Southern Conn.	2(2OT)
Fort Lewis	1

== Final ==
December 5, 1999
13:00 EST (UTC−5)

Southern Connecticut State	2–1 (a.e.t.)	Fort Lewis
Assaf Dagai 21:14' (Scabini); T.J. DeLucia 116'	Report 1 Report 2	Chris Greer 88:01'

Buccaneer Field, Miami Shores, Florida
Attendance: 403

== See also ==
- NCAA Division I Men's Soccer Championship
- NCAA Division III Men's Soccer Championship
- NAIA Men's Soccer Championship
