= 1993 NCAA Division II men's soccer tournament =

1993 NCAA Division II Men's Soccer Championship
Tournament details
- Country: United States
- Teams: 12

Final positions
- Champions: Seattle Pacific (5th title)
- Runners-up: Southern Connecticut

Tournament statistics
- Matches played: 11
- Goals scored: 42 (3.82 per match)
- Top goal scorer(s): (England) Richard Sharpe, Florida Tech (4)

The 1993 NCAA Division II Men's Soccer Championship was the 22nd annual tournament held by the NCAA to determine the top men's Division II college soccer program in the United States.

Seattle Pacific (18-2-1) defeated defending champions Southern Connecticut, 1–0, in the final. This was the fifth national title for the Falcons, who were coached by Cliff McCrath.

== Bracket ==
First Round; *Campus sites
*	Sonoma State	2
Cal Poly SLO	0
*	Tampa	0
USC Spartanburg	4
*	Oakland	2
NE Missouri State	0
*	C.W. Post	4
Franklin Pierce	1

Quarterfinals; *Campus sites
*	Seattle Pacific	4
Sonoma State	0
*	Florida Tech	3(OT)
USC Spartanburg	2
*	Gannon	3(OT)
Oakland	2
*	So. Connecticut	1(3)
C.W. Post	1(2)

Semifinals; *Campus sites
Seattle Pacific	5(10)
*	Florida Tech	5(9)
Gannon	0
So. Connecticut	2

Final; December 4 Melbourne, FL
Seattle Pacific	1
So. Connecticut	0

== Final ==
December 4, 1993
19:30 EST (UTC−5)

Seattle Pacific	1–0	Southern Connecticut
Dominic Dickerson 9:47'	Report

Panther Field, Melbourne, Florida
Attendance: 2,800

== See also ==
- NCAA Division I Men's Soccer Championship
- NCAA Division III Men's Soccer Championship
- NAIA Men's Soccer Championship
