= 1997 NCAA Division II men's soccer tournament =

1997 NCAA Division II Men's Soccer Championship
Tournament details
- Country: United States
- Teams: 16

Final positions
- Champions: Cal State Bakersfield (1st title, 1st final)
- Runners-up: Lynn (1st final)

Tournament statistics
- Matches played: 15
- Goals scored: 52 (3.47 per match)
- Attendance: 7,822 (521 per match)
- Top goal scorer(s): Jeremy Hamm, Cal State Bakersfield (3)
- All statistics correct as of 11/9/2019.

The 1997 NCAA Division II Men's Soccer Championship was the 26th annual tournament held by the NCAA to determine the top Division II men's college soccer program in the United States.

Cal State Bakersfield (20-4) defeated Lynn 1–0 in the tournament final. This was the first national title for the Roadrunners, who were coached by Simon Tobin.

== Bracket ==
First Round; *Campus sites
*	SIU Edwardsville	1
Truman State	2
East Stroudsburg	6(OT)
*	W.V. Wesleyan	5
*	Cal State Bakersfield	3(4OT)
West Texas A&M	2
Fort Lewis	1
*	Seattle Pacific	4
*	Lynn	1(3OT)
Tampa	0
Alabama–Huntsville	2
*	USC Spartanburg	3(2OT)
*	So. Connecticut	2
Dowling	1
Franklin Pierce	0
*	N.H. College	2

Quarterfinals; *Campus sites
*	Truman State	1
East Stroudsburg	0
*	Cal State Bakersfield	4(4OT)
Seattle Pacific	3
*	Lynn	3
USC Spartanburg	1
*	So. Connecticut	1
N.H. College	0

Semifinals; *Campus sites
Truman State	0
Cal State Bakersfield	2
*	Lynn	1
So. Connecticut	0

Final; December 7 Boca Raton, FL
Cal State Bakersfield	1
Lynn	0

== Final ==
December 7, 1997
13:00 EST (UTC−5)

Lynn	0–1	Cal State Bakersfield
	Report	Ben Mains 51:46'

Boca Raton, FL
Attendance: 1,256

== See also ==
- NCAA Division I Men's Soccer Championship
- NCAA Division III Men's Soccer Championship
- NAIA Men's Soccer Championship
