= 1983 NCAA Division II soccer tournament =

1983 NCAA Division II Soccer Championship
Tournament details
- Country: United States
- Teams: 12

Final positions
- Champions: Seattle Pacific (2nd title)
- Runners-up: Tampa

Tournament statistics
- Matches played: 11
- Goals scored: 35 (3.18 per match)
- Top goal scorer(s): Brad Elmenhurst, SPU (2)

The 1983 NCAA Division II Soccer Championship was the 12th annual tournament held by the NCAA to determine the top men's Division II college soccer program in the United States.

Seattle Pacific defeated Tampa in the final, 1–0, to win their second Division II national title. The Falcons (16-4-1), who previously won in 1978, were coached by Cliff McCrath.

The final match was played on December 2 at Pepin-Rood Stadium on the campus of the University of Tampa in Tampa, Florida.

== Bracket ==
First Round; *Campus sites
UM–Saint Louis	1(2OT)
*	Cal State Hayward	0
Keene State	1
*	New Haven	2
*	Florida International	4
Central Florida	1
Davis & Elkins	1
*	Tampa	2(2OT)

Quarterfinals; *Campus sites
*	Seattle Pacific	5
UM–Saint Louis	2
*	Oakland	4
*	Lock Haven	1
*	So. Conn. State	1
New Haven	0
Florida International	2
*	Tampa	3(2OT)

Semifinals; *Campus sites
*	Seattle Pacific	1
Oakland	0
So. Conn. State	1
*	Tampa	2

Final; December 2, 1983; Tampa, FL
Seattle Pacific	1
Tampa	0

== Final ==
December 2, 1983

Seattle Pacific	1–0	Tampa
Gerald McGlynn 9'	Report

Pepin-Rood Stadium, Tampa, Florida
Attendance: 4,117
Referee: Don Buslinger

== See also ==
- NCAA Division I Men's Soccer Championship
- NCAA Division III Men's Soccer Championship
- NAIA Men's Soccer Championship
