= 1986 NCAA Division II soccer tournament =

1986 NCAA Division II Soccer Championship
Tournament details
- Country: United States
- Teams: 12

Final positions
- Champions: Seattle Pacific (4th)
- Runners-up: Oakland

Tournament statistics
- Matches played: 11
- Goals scored: 24 (2.18 per match)
- Top goal scorer(s): (United States) M Faller, SPU (2) (United States) D Machado, SPU (2)

The 1986 NCAA Division II Soccer Championship was the 15th annual tournament held by the NCAA to determine the top men's Division II college soccer program in the United States.

Defending champions Seattle Pacific defeated Oakland, 4–1, to win their fourth Division II national title. The Falcons (17–4–2), winners of three out of the four previous tournaments, were coached by Cliff McCrath.

The final match was played on December 6 at Seattle Pacific University in Seattle, Washington.

== Bracket ==
First Round; *Campus sites
* | S. Conn. State | 1
New Hampshire College | 0
* | Seattle Pacific | 0(PK)
Chico State | 0
East Stroudsburg | 0
* | Tampa | 1
* | Oakland | 1(OT)
Lock Haven | 0

Quarterfinals; *Campus sites
Bridgeport | 2
* | S. Conn. State | 0
* | Cal State Northridge | 1
Seattle Pacific | 2
Davis & Elkins | 3
* | Tampa | 1
* | Gannon | 1
Oakland | 2

Semifinals; *Campus sites
Bridgeport | 1
* | Seattle Pacific | 2
Davis & Elkins | 0
* | Oakland | 1

Final; December 6 Seattle, WA
Seattle Pacific | 4
Oakland | 1

== Final ==
December 6, 1986

| Seattle Pacific | 4–1 | Oakland |
|---|---|---|
| Chris McDonald; Mark Faller 2:54'; Matt Smith; Bob Bruch | Report | Marty Hagen |

Memorial Stadium, Seattle, WA
Attendance: 4,100

== See also ==
- NCAA Division I Men's Soccer Championship
- NCAA Division III Men's Soccer Championship
- NAIA Men's Soccer Championship
