= 1994 NCAA Division II men's soccer tournament =

1994 NCAA Division II Men's Soccer Championship
Tournament details
- Country: United States
- Teams: 12

Final positions
- Champions: Tampa (2nd title)
- Runners-up: Oakland

Tournament statistics
- Matches played: 11
- Goals scored: 49 (4.45 per match)
- Top goal scorer(s): (United States) Phil Bullard, Seattle Pacific (5)

The 1994 NCAA Division II Men's Soccer Championship was the 23rd annual tournament held by the NCAA to determine the top men's Division II college soccer program in the United States.

Tampa (15-2-1) defeated Oakland, 3–0, in the final, following two overtime periods. This was the second national title for the Spartans, who were coached by future Columbus Crew manager Tom Fitzgerald.

== Bracket ==
First Round; *Campus sites
* | Seattle Pacific | 7
Cal State Los Angeles | 0
* | Oakland | 2(3OT)
East Stroudsburg | 1
Franklin Pierce | 5(3OT)
* | C.W. Post | 4
* | Tampa | 3(2OT)
Florida Tech | 1

Quarterfinals; *Campus sites
* | Cal State Bakersfield | 2(1)
Seattle Pacific | 2(3)
* | Wisconsin–Parkside | 0
Oakland | 2
* | So. Connecticut | 3
Franklin Pierce | 1
* | USC Spartanburg | 0
Tampa | 3

Semifinals; *Campus sites
Seattle Pacific | 4
Oakland | 6(2OT)
So. Connecticut | 0(4)
Tampa | 0(5)

Final; December 3 Tampa, FL
Oakland | 0
Tampa | 3(2OT)

== Final ==
December 2, 1994
19:30 EST (UTC−5)

| Tampa | 3–0 (a.e.t.) | Oakland |
|---|---|---|
| Martin Nebrelius 98:42', 114:48' (Paulsson); Adrian Bush 117:20' (Lilius) | Report |

Pepin-Rood Stadium, Tampa, Florida
Attendance: 4,336

== See also ==
- 1994 NCAA Division I men's soccer tournament
- 1994 NCAA Division III men's soccer tournament
- 1994 NCAA Division II women's soccer tournament
- 1994 NAIA men's soccer tournament
