= 1987 NCAA Division II soccer tournament =

1987 NCAA Division II Soccer Championship
Tournament details
- Country: United States
- Teams: 12

Final positions
- Champions: S. Conn. State (1st)
- Runners-up: Cal State Northridge

Tournament statistics
- Matches played: 11
- Goals scored: 26 (2.36 per match)
- Top goal scorer(s): (United States) A Vaughn, SCSU (2) (Cape Verde) J DeBrito, SCSU (2)

The 1987 NCAA Division II Soccer Championship was the 16th annual tournament held by the NCAA to determine the top men's Division II college soccer program in the United States.

Southern Connecticut State defeated Cal State Northridge, 2–0, to win their first Division II national title. The Fighting Owls (17–1–3) were coached by Bob Dikranian.

The final match was played on December 5 in Tampa, Florida.

== Bracket ==
First Round; Campus sites
New Hampshire College	0
CW Post	1
UM–Saint Louis	2
Oakland	1
East Stroudsburg	1
Lock Haven	2
Seattle Pacific	2
Cal Poly–SLO	1

Quarterfinals; Campus sites
CW Post	2
S. Conn. State	3
UM–Saint Louis	1
Lock Haven	0
Tampa	2
Florida Tech	1
Seattle Pacific	0
Cal State Northridge	1

Semifinals; Campus sites
S. Conn. State	1
UM–Saint Louis	0
Tampa	0
Cal State Northridge	3

Final; December 5 Tampa, FL
S. Conn. State	2
Cal State Northridge	0

== Final ==
December 5, 1987

Southern Connecticut State	2–0	Cal State Northridge
John DeBrito 14:17' (Galka), 78:17' (Vaughn); Mike Cashman (yellow card)	Report	Mark Zarkowski (yellow card); Willie Lopez (yellow card)

Pepin-Rood Stadium, Tampa, FL
Attendance: 1,700

== See also ==
- NCAA Division I Men's Soccer Championship
- NCAA Division III Men's Soccer Championship
- NAIA Men's Soccer Championship
