= Grand Canyon Antelopes men's soccer =

American college soccer team

- Founded: 1985; 41 years ago
- University: Grand Canyon University
- Head coach: Jamie Davies (1st season)
- Conference: Mountain West
- Location: Phoenix, Arizona, US
- Stadium: GCU Stadium (capacity: 6,000)
- Nickname: Antelopes
- Colors: Purple, black, and white
Home	Away

NCAA tournament Round of 16
- 2025

NCAA tournament Round of 32
- 2025, 2026

NCAA tournament appearances
- 2018, 2020, 2021, 2025, 2026

Conference tournament championships
- 2018, 2025

Conference regular season championships
- 2020, 2021

The Grand Canyon Antelopes men's soccer program represents Grand Canyon University (GCU) in all NCAA Division I men's college soccer competitions. Founded in 1985, the Antelopes most recently competed in the Western Athletic Conference (WAC) from 2013 to 2025. In 2026, the Lopes will move to the school's primary athletic home of the Mountain West Conference (MW). GCU plays its home matches at GCU Stadium.

When the athletic department joined the MW in most sports, the school announced that the men's soccer program would remain in the WAC as an affiliate member. The MW will add men's soccer in 2026 with GCU as one of the league's inaugural members.

== NCAA Tournament history ==
After transitioning from NCAA Division II to Division I, GCU was eligible for the Division I postseason for the first time in 2017. The Lopes qualified for the NCAA Tournament in just their second season of Division I eligibility, winning the Western Athletic Conference Men's Soccer Tournament in 2018 behind three consecutive 1–0 shutout victories.

Grand Canyon qualified for the NCAA Tournament seven times at the Division II level, highlighted by a Division II National Championship in 1996.

GCU advanced in the NCAA Tournament for the first time at the Division I level on Nov. 20, 2025, drawing UCLA and advancing 3–1 in penalty kicks. GCU recorded its first winning result in an NCAA Tournament match just days later at San Diego.

Season	Round	Opponent	Score
2018	First round	UC Irvine	1–1 (lost in (p))
2020	First round	Washington	0–2
2021	Second round	Denver	0–1
2025	First round	UCLA	0–0 (won in (p))
2025	Second round	No. 9 San Diego	2–1
2025	Third Round	No. 8 Portland	0–1

== Facility history ==
The Lopes played at GCU Soccer Field up until the construction of GCU Stadium. GCU played its inaugural season in the new facility in 2016. Since the opening of the facility, GCU has ranked in the top 10 in average attendance per match in 2016 and 2018, getting significant fan support from the university's student section, the Havocs.

GCU Stadium hosted its first game on August 26, 2016, when GCU defeated UCF 4–2. The crowd of 6,402 fans was the ninth-largest crowd in the 2016 NCAA Division I men's soccer season.

GCU hosted the fourth-largest crowd of the 2018 NCAA Division I men's soccer season when it opened the season by defeating Wisconsin 2–1 in front of 6,648 fans.

== Notable seasons ==
=== 2018 ===
The 2018 team qualified for the program's first ever NCAA Division I Men's Soccer Tournament by going 3–0 in the WAC Tournament.

GCU finished as the nation's most improved defense, ranking 181st nationally in goals against average in 2017 before jumping to 25th in 2018.

The Lopes finished the season 5–0 against top-25 opponents, defeating No. 12 Wisconsin, No. 20 Creighton, No. 25 Seattle U, and Air Force twice, once as No. 8 and once as No. 13.

=== 1996 ===
Grand Canyon won the NCAA Division II Men's Soccer Championship by defeating Seattle Pacific, Lynn and Oakland.

== Seasons ==
Season	Team	Overall	Conference	Standing	Postseason
Peter Duah (NAIA) (1985–1991)
1985	Peter Duah	3–7–1			
1986	Peter Duah	8–6–1			
1987	Peter Duah	12–2–0			
1988	Peter Duah	10–7–2			
1989	Peter Duah	12–5–2			
1990	Peter Duah	12–7–2			
1991	Peter Duah	13–6–1			
Peter Duah (NCAA Division II Independent) (1992)
1992	Peter Duah	16–4–1			NCAA Division II First Round
Peter Duah:		86–44–10			
Petar Draksin (NCAA Division II Independent) (1993)
1993	Petar Draksin	4–13–2			
Petar Draksin (California Collegiate Athletic Association) (1994–2003)
1994	Petar Draksin	4–13–2	6–4–0	3rd	
1995	Petar Draksin	14–4–3	7–3–0	2nd	NCAA Division II Quarterfinals
1996	Petar Draksin	12–4–5	5–2–3	1st	NCAA Division II Champions
1997	Petar Draksin	7–12–1	2–8–0	5th	
1998	Petar Draksin	17–6–1	10–4–1	T–2nd (South)	NCAA Division II Quarterfinals
1999	Petar Draksin	17–4–0	12–3–0	1st (South)	
2000	Petar Draksin	11–7–3	9–4–1	2nd (South)	
2001	Petar Draksin	13–8–0	11–3–0	1st (South)	
2002	Petar Draksin	5–15–0	2–12–0	4th (South)	
2003	Petar Draksin	4–12–1	3–11–0	4th (South)	
Petar Draksin (NCAA Division II Independent) (2004–2005)
2004	Petar Draksin	3–15–1			
2005	Petar Draksin	9–8–2			
Petar Draksin (Pacific West Conference) (2006–2012)
2006	Petar Draksin	14–6–0	9–1–0	1st	
2007	Petar Draksin	11–5–5	8–0–2	T–1st	NCAA Division II First round
2008	Petar Draksin	8–7–4	7–3–2	3rd	
2009	Petar Draksin	14–3–3	9–1–2	1st	
2010	Petar Draksin	14–2–2	12–1–1	1st	
2011	Petar Draksin	13–4–1	9–2–1	3rd	
2012	Petar Draksin	16–3–1	12–1–1	1st	NCAA Division II Third round
Petar Draksin (Western Athletic Conference) (2013–2014)
2013	Petar Draksin	4–14–1	2–8–0	8th	
2014	Petar Draksin	5–12–3	2–6–2	9th	
Petar Draksin:		225–171–41	137–77–16		
Schellas Hyndman (Western Athletic Conference) (2015–2020)
2015	Schellas Hyndman	7–10–0	3–7–0	10th	
2016	Schellas Hyndman	7–9–3	4–3–3	5th	
2017	Schellas Hyndman	7–11–1	4–5–1	T–6th	
2018	Schellas Hyndman	12–8–1	6–4–0	T–4th	NCAA First round
2019	Schellas Hyndman	4–9–4	1–7–3	11th	
2020	Schellas Hyndman	8–2–0	7–0–0	1st	NCAA Second round
Schellas Hyndman:		45–49–9	25–26–7		
Leonard Griffin (Western Athletic Conference) (2021)
2021	Leonard Griffin	15–4–1	11–9–0	1st	NCAA First round
Leonard Griffin:		15–4–1	9–2–0		
Mike Kraus (Western Athletic Conference) (2022–2023)
2022	Mike Kraus	7–8–3	4–3–2	T–5th	
2023	Mike Kraus	7–7–3	2–4–2	7th	
Mike Kraus:		14–15–6	6–7–4		
George Kiefer (Western Athletic Conference) (2024–2025)
2024	George Kiefer	5–10–3	2–6–1	9th	
2025	George Kiefer	14–4–5	3–1–3	T–2nd	NCAA third round
George Kiefer:		19–14–8	5–7–4		
Jamie Davies (Mountain West Conference) (2026–present)
2026	Jamie Davies				
Total:		404–297–75 (.569)			
National champion Postseason invitational champion Conference regular season champion Conference regular season and conference tournament champion Division regular season champion Division regular season and conference tournament champion Conference tournament champion

== Coaching history ==
GCU has had seven head coaches in its program history.

Years	Coach	Overall					Conference				
Years	Coach	GP	W	L	T	Pct.	GP	W	L	T	Pct.
1985–92	Peter Duah	140	86	44	10	.650					
1993–2014	Petar Draksin	437	225	171	41	.562					
2015–20	Schellas Hyndman	103	45	49	9	.481	58	25	26	7	.491
2021	Leonard Griffin	20	15	4	1	.775	11	9	2	0	.818
2022–23	Mike Kraus	35	14	15	6	.486	17	6	7	4	.471
2024–25	George Kiefer	41	19	14	8	.569	16	5	7	4	.438
2026–	Jamie Davies	0	0	0	0	—	0	0	0	0	—
Totals		776	404	297	75	.569	317	176	112	29	.601

Last updated: February 25, 2026

== Notable alumni ==
- Matheau Hall, professional soccer player
- Niki Jackson, Colorado Rapids and 2018 MLS SuperDraft pick
- Hector Montalvo, Tigres UANL
- Saeed Robinson, Colorado Springs Switchbacks
- Amer Sasivarevic, OKC Energy FC and 2018 MLS SuperDraft pick (program's first MLS SuperDraft pick)
- Evan Waldrep, Phoenix Rising FC
- Esai Easley, Sporting Kansas City and 2022 MLS SuperDraft pick
- Justin Rasmussen, Portland Timbers and 2022 MLS SuperDraft pick
