= 2015 NCAA Division II men's soccer tournament =

2015 NCAA Division II Men's Soccer Championship
Tournament details
- Country: United States
- Dates: November 12–December 5, 2015
- Teams: 38

Final positions
- Champions: Pfeiffer (1st title, 1st final)
- Runners-up: Cal Poly Pomona (1st final)
- Third place: Charleston (WV) & Rockhurst (MO)

Tournament statistics
- Matches played: 37
- Goals scored: 128 (3.46 per match)
- Attendance: 15,583 (421 per match)
- Top goal scorer(s): Nathan Regis (Pfeiffer) – 7 G, 2 A, 16 Pts.

Awards
- Best player: Nathan Regis (Pfeiffer)
- All statistics correct as of 12/5/2015.

The 2015 NCAA Division II Men's Soccer Championship was the 44th annual single-elimination tournament to determine the national champion of NCAA Division II men's collegiate soccer in the United States. The semifinals and championship game were played at Ashton Brosnaham Stadium in Pensacola, Florida from December 3–5, 2015 while the preceding rounds were played at various sites across the country during November 2015.

== Qualification ==
All Division II men's soccer programs were eligible to qualify for the 38-team tournament field. All Division II men's soccer programs were eligible to qualify for the 38-team tournament field. No teams received automatic bids; at-large bids are based on the teams' regular season records and the Quality of Winning Percentage Index. Teams were placed into one of four unbalanced super-regional brackets, consisting of eight or ten teams, based on geographic location.

School	Conference	Record
Adelphi	Northeast-10 Conference	13–4–3
Cal Poly Pomona	California Collegiate Athletic Association	13–2–5
Cal State Dominguez Hills	California Collegiate Athletic Association	14–2–3
Cal State L.A.	California Collegiate Athletic Association	12–4–2
Cal State Stanislaus	California Collegiate Athletic Association	15–4–2
Carson-Newman	South Atlantic Conference	15–2–2
Cedarville	Great Midwest Athletic Conference	14–3–2
Charleston	Mountain East Conference	17–2–0
Colorado Mesa	Rocky Mountain Athletic Conference	14–4–2
Colorado Mines	Rocky Mountain Athletic Conference	14–4–2
Fort Hays State	Mid-America Intercollegiate Athletics Association	12–5–1
Fresno Pacific	Pacific West Conference	14–2–2
Lander	Peach Belt Conference	14–3–1
Le Moyne	Northeast-10 Conference	12–5–1
Limestone	Conference Carolinas	15–4–0
LIU Post	East Coast Conference	14–2–2
Merrimack	Northeast-10 Conference	14–3–2
Midwestern State	Independent	16–0–1
Millersville	Pennsylvania State Athletic Conference	14–4–1

School	Conference	Record
Northwood (MI)	Great Lakes Intercollegiate Athletic Conference	16–1–1
Notre Dame College	Mountain East Conference	13–6–0
Palm Beach Atlantic	Independent	15–1–1
Pfeiffer	Conference Carolinas	20–0–0
Quincy	Great Lakes Valley Conference	12–6–2
Rockhurst	Great Lakes Valley Conference	16–1–2
Rollins	Sunshine State Conference	12–7–0
Saginaw Valley State	Great Lakes Intercollegiate Athletic Conference	14–2–1
St. Leo	Sunshine State Conference	10–6–1
Seattle Pacific	Great Northwest Athletic Conference	14–1–3
Southern New Hampshire	Northeast-10 Conference	18–1–0
St. Edward's	Heartland Conference	15–2–2
UIndy	Great Lakes Valley Conference	12–5–3
Upper Iowa	Mid-America Intercollegiate Athletics Association	13–3–1
Urbana	Mountain East Conference	12–4–2
West Alabama	Gulf South Conference	10–6–2
Wilmington	Central Atlantic Collegiate Conference	14–5–0
Wingate	South Atlantic Conference	14–3–3
Young Harris	Peach Belt Conference	16–3–0

== Tournament bracket ==
=== Super Region No. 1 ===
First Round; Thursday, November 12
4	Merrimack	2
5	Le Moyne	1
6	Wilmington (DE)	4
3	Adelphi	3

Second Round; Saturday & Sunday, November 14 &15
1	*'Southern New Hampshire	3
4	Merrimack	0
6	Wilmington	0
2	*LIU Post	6
1	*Charleston (WV)	4
4	Notre Dame (OH)	2
3	Urbana	1
2	*Millersville	0

Third Round; Friday, November 20
1	Southern New Hampshire	0(4)
2	LIU Post (PKs)	0(5)
1	Charleston (WV)	1
3	Urbana	0

Quarterfinals; Sunday, November 22
2	LIU Post	1
1	Charleston (WV)	2

=== Super Region No. 2 ===
First Round; Friday, November 13
4	Lander	1(4)
5	Wingate (PKs)	1(5)
6	Limestone	3
3	Carson-Newman	1

Second Round; Saturday & Sunday, November 14 &15
1	*Palm Beach Atlantic	2
4	West Alabama	0
3	Saint Leo	2
2	*Rollins	3
1	*Pfeiffer	2
5	Wingate	1
6	Limestone	1
2	*Young Harris	2

Third Round; Friday, November 20
1	Palm Beach Atlantic	6
2	Rollins	1
1	Pfeiffer	3
2	Young Harris	0

Quarterfinals; Sunday, November 22
1	Palm Beach Atlantic	4
1	Pfeiffer	5

=== Super Region No. 3 ===
First Round; Thursday, November 12
4	Cal St. Stanislaus	1
5	Cal St. L.A. PKs 3–0	1
6	Fresno Pacific	2
3	Cal St. Dominguez Hills	3

Second Round; Saturday & Sunday, November 14 &15
1	*Cal Poly Pomona	1
5	Cal St. L.A.	0
3	Cal St. Dominguez Hills PKs	1(3)
2	*Seattle Pacific	1(1)
1	*Midwestern State	4
4	Colorado Mesa	2
3	St. Edward's	1
2	*Colorado Mines	2

Third Round; Friday, November 20
1	Cal Poly Pomona	1
3	Cal St. Dominguez Hills	1
1	Midwestern State	1
2	Colorado Mines	2

Quarterfinals; Sunday, November 22
1	Cal Poly Pomona	3
2	Colorado Mines	2

=== Super Region No. 4 ===
First Round; Thursday, November 12
4	Cedarville	3
5	Quincy	0
6	Indianapolis	0
3	Saginaw Valley State	2

Second Round; Saturday & Sunday, November 14 &15
1	*Rockhurst	3
4	Cedarville	0
3	Saginaw Valley State	1
2	*Northwood (MI)	3

Third Round; Friday, November 20
1	Rockhurst	2
2	Northwood (MI)	1
1	Upper Iowa	2
2	Fort Hays State	4

Quarterfinals; Sunday, November 22
1	Rockhurst PKs	1(4)
2	Fort Hays State	1(1)

- * Host schools

=== Division II College Cup ===
Semifinals; December 3, 2015; Ashton Brosnaham Stadium; Pensacola, Florida
Charleston	1
Pfeiffer	2
Cal Poly Pomona	1
Rockhurst	0

Championship; December 5, 2015; Ashton Brosnaham Stadium; Pensacola, Florida
Pfeiffer	4
Cal Poly Pomona	0

== Final ==
December 5, 2015
15:00 EST (UTC−5)

Pfeiffer	4–0	Cal Poly Pomona
Nathan Regis 2:32' (Buzzo), 61' (pen.); Jaime Siaj 3:59' (Galvao); Martim Galvão 62:19' (Siaj); Santi Moar (yellow card) 68:10'	Report	Alexander Turkson (yellow card) 41:32'; Justyn Peeples (yellow card) 60:44'; Eshel Chardon (yellow card) 63:15'

Ashton Brosnaham Stadium, Pensacola, Florida
Attendance: 301
Referee: Robert Sibiga

== See also ==
- NCAA Men's Soccer Championships (Division I, Division III)
- NCAA Women's Soccer Championships (Division I, Division II, Division III)
