= NCAA Division II men's soccer tournament =

College soccer tournament

- NCAA logo
- Association: NCAA
- Sport: Men's college soccer
- Founded: 1972; 54 years ago
- Division: Division II
- No. of teams: 42
- Country: United States; Canada
- Most recent champion: Midwestern State (1st)
- Most titles: Southern Connecticut (6)
- Website: ncaa.com/soccer

The NCAA Division II men's soccer tournament (formerly the NCAA College Division soccer tournament) is an annual event organized by the National Collegiate Athletic Association (NCAA) to determine the national champions of men's collegiate soccer among its Division II members in the United States and Canada. It has been held every year since 1972; prior to that, all teams competed in a single tournament.

The most successful program has been Southern Connecticut State, with six national titles.

Midwestern State are the defending champions, winning their first national title in 2025.

== Format ==
The Division II tournament is structured around four unbalanced Super Regionals from the eight NCAA regions (Atlantic, Central, East, Midwest, South, South Central, Southeast, and West). At least two and as many as six teams from each region are selected with no automatic qualifiers given. The selection criteria used is similar to that used in Division I, although one difference is that the RPI is replaced with the Quality of Winning Percentage Index, a more subjective measure. In 2016, the tournament field consisted of a 38-team, single-elimination tournament.

The first two rounds are played on campus sites with the highest seed usually hosting the regional semis and finals. The winners of each region meet in the third round and/or quarterfinals, with the host being determined by specific criteria or, failing that, geographical rotation. The final two rounds are played at a predetermined site. The 2016 semifinals and final, for example, were held at Swope Soccer Village in Kansas City, Missouri and hosted by the Mid-America Intercollegiate Athletics Association and the Kansas City Sports Commission.

== Results ==
=== Year by year ===
Keys

- (a.e.t.) – match went to extra time
- (p) – match result defined on penalties

Ed.	Year	Host city	Championship			Third place match / Semifinalists		
Ed.	Year	Host city	Champion	Score	Runner-Up	Third Place	Score	Fourth Place
1	1972	Edwardsville, IL	SIU Edwardsville (1)	1–0	Oneonta State	Chico State and Baltimore (Note: No third place match held.)		
2	1973	Springfield, MA	UMSL (1)	3–0	Cal State Fullerton	Adelphi	1–0	Baltimore
3	1974	St. Louis, MO	Adelphi (1)	3–2	Seattle Pacific	UDC	5–3	Eastern Illinois
4	1975	Seattle, WA	Baltimore (1)	3–1	Seattle Pacific	Adelphi	9–1	UW–Green Bay
5	1976	Seattle, WA	Loyola Maryland (1)	2–0	New Haven	Chico State	2–2 (4–2 p)	UMSL
6	1977	University Park, FL	Alabama A&M (1)	2–1	Seattle Pacific	New Haven	2–2 (5–3 p)	UW–Green Bay
7	1978	University Park, FL	Seattle Pacific (1)	1–0 (a.e.t.)	Alabama A&M	Eastern Illinois	2–1	Southern Connecticut
8	1979	University Park, FL	Alabama A&M (2)	2–0	Eastern Illinois	Seattle Pacific	1–0 (a.e.t.)	Southern Connecticut
9	1980	University Park, FL	Lock Haven (1)	1–0 (a.e.t.)	FIU	Cal State Chico	2–1 (a.e.t.)	Southern Connecticut
10	1981	New Haven, CT	Tampa (1)	1–0 (a.e.t.)	Cal State LA	Southern Connecticut	3–1	UMSL
11	1982	University Park, FL	FIU (1)	2–1	Southern Connecticut	UMSL and Oakland (Note: No third place match has been played since this edition.)		
12	1983	Tampa, FL	Seattle Pacific (2)	1–0	Tampa	Oakland and Southern Connecticut		
13	1984	Seattle, WA	FIU (2)	1–0 (a.e.t.)	Seattle Pacific	New Haven and UMSL		
14	1985	University Park, FL	Seattle Pacific (3)	3–2	FIU	NYIT and Davis & Elkins		
15	1986	Seattle, WA	Seattle Pacific (4)	4–1	Oakland	Bridgeport and Davis & Elkins		
16	1987	Tampa, FL	Southern Connecticut (1)	2–0	Cal State Northridge	UMSL and Tampa		
17	1988	Northridge, CA	Florida Tech (1)	3–2	Cal State Northridge	Southern Connecticut and Oakland		
18	1989	Greensboro, NC	SNHU (1)	3–1	UNC Greensboro	Cal State Hayward and Gannon		
19	1990	Melbourne, FL	Southern Connecticut (2)	0–0 (4–3 p)	Seattle Pacific	Gannon and Florida Tech		
20	1991	Melbourne, FL	Florida Tech (2)	5–1	Sonoma State	Cal Poly Pomona (Note: Later vacated by NCAA.) and Franklin Pierce		
21	1992	Tampa, FL	Southern Connecticut (3)	1–0	Tampa	Oakland and Seattle Pacific		
22	1993	Melbourne, FL	Seattle Pacific (5)	1–0	Southern Connecticut	Florida Tech and Gannon		
23	1994	Tampa, FL	Tampa (2)	3–0 (a.e.t.)	Oakland	Seattle Pacific and Southern Connecticut		
24	1995	Spartanburg, SC	Southern Connecticut (4)	2–0	USC Spartanburg	Mercyhurst and Cal State Bakersfield		
25	1996	Phoenix, AZ	Grand Canyon (1)	3–1	Oakland	Lynn and Southern Connecticut		
26	1997	Boca Raton, FL	Cal State Bakersfield (1)	1–0	Lynn	Truman State and Southern Connecticut		
27	1998	Spartanburg, SC	Southern Connecticut (5)	1–0	USC Spartanburg	Mercyhurst and Seattle Pacific		
28	1999	Miami Shores, FL	Southern Connecticut (6)	2–1 (a.e.t.)	Fort Lewis	Charleston (WV) and Barry		
29	2000	Miami Shores, FL	Cal State DH (1)	2–1 (a.e.t.)	Barry	East Stroudsburg and Lewis		
30	2001	Tampa, FL	Tampa (3)	2–1	Cal State DH	Dowling and SIU Edwardsville		
31	2002	Virginia Beach, VA	Sonoma State (1)	4–3	SNHU	Central Arkansas and Mercyhurst		
32	2003	Virginia Beach, VA	Lynn (1)	2–1	Chico State	Findlay and Dowling		
33	2004	Wichita Falls, TX	Seattle (1)	2–1	SIU Edwardsville	UNC Pembroke and Dowling		
34	2005	Wichita Falls, TX	Fort Lewis (1)	3–1	Franklin Pierce	Lynn and SIU Edwardsville		
35	2006	Pensacola, FL	Dowling (1)	1–0	Fort Lewis	Lincoln Memorial and West Florida		
36	2007	Orange Beach, AL	Franklin Pierce (1)	1–0	Lincoln Memorial	Montevallo and Midwestern State		
37	2008	Tampa, FL	Cal State DH (2)	3–0	Dowling	Tampa and Northern Kentucky		
38	2009	Tampa, FL	Fort Lewis (2)	1–0	Lees-McRae	Le Moyne and Lewis		
39	2010	Louisville, KY	Northern Kentucky (1)	3–2	Rollins	Dowling and Midwestern State		
40	2011	Pensacola, FL	Fort Lewis (3)	3–2	Lynn	Franklin Pierce and Millersville		
41	2012	Evans, GA	Lynn (2)	3–2	Saginaw Valley State	Simon Fraser and Mercyhurst		
42	2013	Evans, GA	SNHU (2)	2–1	Carson–Newman	Rockhurst and Simon Fraser		
43	2014	Louisville, KY	Lynn (3)	3–2	Charleston (WV)	Colorado Mesa and Quincy		
44	2015	Pensacola, FL	Pfeiffer (1)	4–0	Cal Poly Pomona	Charleston (WV) and Rockhurst		
45	2016	Kansas City, MO	Wingate (1)	2–0	Charleston (WV)	Rockhurst and UC San Diego		
46	2017	Kansas City, MO	Charleston (WV) (1)	2–2 (a.e.t.)	Lynn	Cal Poly Pomona and Rockhurst		
47	2018	Pittsburgh, PA	Barry (1)	2–1	West Chester	Cal Poly Pomona and Fort Hays State		
48	2019	Pittsburgh, PA	Charleston (WV) (2)	2–0	Cal State LA	Indianapolis and Lynn		
–	2020	–	(tournament canceled due to the COVID-19 pandemic)			–		
49	2021	Colorado Springs, CO	Cal State LA (1)	1–0	Charleston (WV)	Indianapolis and Nova Southeastern		
50	2022	Seattle, WA	Franklin Pierce (2)	2–0	CSU Pueblo	Barry and Lake Erie		
51	2023	Matthews, NC	Franklin Pierce (3)	4–0	CSU Pueblo	Florida Tech and Lewis		
52	2024	Matthews, NC	Lynn (4)	3–2	Charleston (WV)	CSU Pueblo and McKendree		
53	2025	Matthews, NC	Midwestern State (1)	2–0	Rollins	Fort Hays State and SNHU		
54	2026	Kansas City, MO						
55	2027	Huntsville, AL						

== Champions ==
National Championships by school: 6, 5, 4, 3, 2, 1

=== Active programs ===
Team	Titles	Years
Southern Connecticut	6	1987, 1990, 1992, 1995, 1998, 1999
Seattle Pacific	5	1978, 1983, 1985, 1986, 1993
Lynn	4	2003, 2012, 2014, 2024
Franklin Pierce	3	2007, 2022, 2023
Fort Lewis	3	2005, 2009, 2013
Tampa	3	1981, 1994, 2001
Cal State Dominguez Hills	2	2000, 2008
Charleston (WV)	2	2017, 2019
Florida Tech	2	1988, 1991
SNHU	2	1989, 2013
Adelphi	1	1974
Barry	1	2018
Cal State Los Angeles	1	2021
Lock Haven	1	1980
Midwestern State	1	2025
UMSL	1	1973
Wingate	1	2016

=== Former programs ===
Team	Titles	Years
Alabama A&M	2	1977, 1979
FIU	2	1982, 1984
Baltimore	1	1975
Cal State Bakersfield	1	1997
Dowling	1	2006
Grand Canyon	1	1996
Loyola (MD)	1	1976
Northern Kentucky	1	2010
Pfeiffer	1	2015
Seattle	1	2004
SIU Edwardsville	1	1972
Sonoma State	1	2002

== Finals hosting history ==
From 1982 through 2002, the highest seeded finalist or semifinalist school was designated as the host for the finals. The University of Tampa has hosted the finals seven times, more than any other school. Florida International is the only school to have hosted four championships in a row. The championship final has been played in the state of Florida on 22 occasions, 18 more times than any other state. On seven occasions the host team has won the championship.

Key

- Schools in italics are no longer Division II members.
- Venues: number of matches hosted, indicated in brackets
- Years in bold indicate when the host school won championship

School/ Conference	Hosted	Years	Venues
Tampa	7	1983, 1987, 1992, **1994**, **2001**, 2008, 2009	Plant Field (5), Pepin Stadium (2)
Florida International	6	1977, 1978, 1979, 1980, **1982**, 1985	Sunblazers Stadium
West Florida	4	2006, 2007, 2011, 2015	Ashton Brosnaham (3), Orange Beach (1)
Seattle Pacific	4	1975, 1976, 1984, **1986**	Memorial Stadium
Florida Tech	3	1990, **1991**, 1993	FIT Varsity Field (2), Panther Stadium (1)
Slippery Rock	2	2018, 2019	Highmark Stadium
Mid-America IAA	2	2016, 2017	Swope Village
Peach Belt Conference	2	2012, 2013	Blanchard Woods Park (Evans, GA)
Bellarmine	2	2010, 2014	Owsley Frazier
Midwestern State	2	2004, 2005	MSU Soccer Field
	2	2002, 2003	Virginia Beach Sportsplex
Barry	2	1999, 2000	Buccaneer Field
USC Spartanburg	2	1995, 1998	Rifle Field
Lynn	1	1997	McCusker Sports Complex
Grand Canyon	1	**1996**	GCU Stadium
UNC Greensboro	1	1989	Campus Field
Cal State Northridge	1	1988	North Campus Stadium
Southern Connecticut	1	1981	Reese Stadium
UM–St. Louis	1	1974	Don Dallas Soccer Field
Springfield (MA)	1	1973	Benedum Field
SIU Edwardsville	1	**1972**	Cougar Field

== Former programs in Division I ==
Conference affiliations are current for the ongoing 2024 NCAA men's soccer season.

School	Championship	Year moved	Current Conference
SIU Edwardsville	1972	1973, 2008 (Note: SIUE returned to Division II from 1996 through 2007.)	Ohio Valley Conference
Loyola (Maryland)	1976	1979	Patriot League
Alabama A&M	1977, 1979	1999	Southwestern Athletic Conference
FIU (Florida International)	1982, 1984	1987	American Athletic Conference
Grand Canyon	1996	2013	Western Athletic Conference (Note: Grand Canyon's men's soccer affiliation beyond the 2024 season is uncertain. It initially announced a 2025 move to the West Coast Conference, but reneged on the move in favor of joining the Mountain West Conference, which sponsors soccer only for women.)
CSU Bakersfield	1997	2006	Big West Conference
Seattle	2004	2008	Western Athletic Conference (West Coast Conference in 2025)
Northern Kentucky	2010	2012	Horizon League

== Schools ranked by number of appearances ==
Schools indicated in pink no longer compete in Division II.

Rank	School	App.
1	Seattle Pacific	35
2	Southern Connecticut	32
3	Tampa	27
4	Franklin Pierce	23
4	SNHU (N.H. College)	23
6	East Stroudsburg	20
7	Lynn	19
8	Midwestern State	18
9	UMSL	17
10	Cal State Los Angeles	16
10	Rollins	16
10	Mercyhurst	16

- In addition to the above schools, Alabama A&M moved to Division I after winning Division II titles in 1977 and 1979. However, it discontinued its men's soccer program after the 2010 season.
- Adelphi also moved to Division I in 1976, after winning the Division II title in 1974, but returned to Division II in 2013.

== See also ==
- List of NCAA Division II men's soccer programs
- NCAA Division II men's soccer tournament appearances by school
- NCAA men's soccer tournaments (Division I, Division III)
- NCAA women's soccer tournaments (Division I, Division II, Division III)
- NAIA national men's soccer championship
- Intercollegiate Soccer Football Association
