= 1988 NCAA Division I men's soccer tournament =

1988 Men's College Cup

Tournament details
- Country: United States
- Venue(s): Bill Armstrong Stadium; Bloomington, Indiana
- Teams: 24

Final positions
- Champions: Indiana (3rd title)
- Runners-up: Howard
- Semifinalists: Portland; South Carolina

Tournament statistics
- Matches played: 23
- Goals scored: 65 (2.83 per match)
- Attendance: 38,560 (1,677 per match)
- Top goal scorer(s): Michael Dominic, Brooklyn (3); Ian Hennessy, Seton Hall (3)

Awards
- Best player: Ken Snow, Indiana (offensive); Mike Anehauser, Indiana (defensive)

The 1988 NCAA Division I men's soccer tournament was the 30th annual tournament organized by the National Collegiate Athletic Association to determine the national champion of men's collegiate soccer among its Division I members in the United States.

Indiana won their third national title, defeating Howard in the championship game, 1–0

The final match was played on December 4 at Bill Armstrong Stadium in Bloomington, Indiana. All the other games were played at the home field of the higher seeded team.

== Qualifying ==
Three teams made their debut appearances in the NCAA Division I men's soccer tournament: Notre Dame, Portland, and Wake Forest.

== Bracket ==
First round
Fairleigh Dickinson	1
Penn State	0
Philadelphia Textile	1
Navy	0
Wake Forest	0
North Carolina	2
Notre Dame	0
SMU	2
Brooklyn College	4
Adelphi	1
Boston University	3
Connecticut	1
San Diego State	1
UCLA	2
UNLV	1
Fresno State (pen.)	2

Second round
Virginia	1
Fairleigh Dickinson	0
Howard (pen.)	2
Philadelphia Textile	1
South Carolina	3
North Carolina	1
Saint Louis	1
SMU (2OT)	2
Seton Hall	5
Brooklyn College	2
Indiana	3
Boston University	1
Portland	2
UCLA	1
Evansville	1
Fresno State (pen.)	2

Quarterfinals
Virginia	2
Howard (2OT)	3
South Carolina	1
SMU	0
Seton Hall	1
Indiana	3
Portland	2
Fresno State	0

Semifinals
Howard	2
South Carolina	0
Indiana	1
Portland	0

Championship
Howard	0
Indiana	1

== Final ==
December 4, 1988

Howard	0–1	Indiana

Bill Armstrong Stadium, Bloomington, Indiana
Attendance: 5,168

== See also ==
- 1988 NCAA Division I women's soccer tournament
- 1988 NCAA Division II men's soccer tournament
- 1988 NCAA Division III men's soccer tournament
- 1988 NAIA men's soccer championship
