= Rick Iversen =

American soccer player

Personal information
- Position: Defender

Youth career
- 1987: San Diego State Aztecs
- 1988: Cal State Northridge Matadors

Senior career*
Years	Team	Apps	(Gls)
1986–1987	San Diego Nomads		
1988	Los Angeles Heat		
1989	Victoria Vistas	19	(3)
1990	Aalborg BK	12	
1991	Miami Freedom	7	(0)
1992	San Francisco Bay Blackhawks	14	(0)
1994	Silicon Valley Firebirds		
1996	San Jose Clash	0	(0)
1996	→ Reno Rattlers (loan)		
1997–1998	California Jaguars	26	(0)
- * Club domestic league appearances and goals

Rick Iversen is an American retired soccer defender who played professionally in the American Professional Soccer League and USISL.

== Youth ==
In 1987, Iversen, in his only season with the San Diego State University men's soccer team, went to the final of the 1987 NCAA Division I Men's Soccer Championship. He then transferred to California State University, Northridge. In December 1988, Iversen scored the game-winning goal to put CSUN into the NCAA Division II Men's Soccer Championship final where they fell to Florida Tech. He was the 1988 NCAA Division II Defensive MVP. In addition to playing collegiate soccer, Iversen also spent two seasons with the San Diego Nomads in the Western Soccer Alliance (1986–1987). In 1988, he played for the Los Angeles Heat.

== Professional ==
On April 26, 1989, Iversen turned professional with the Victoria Vistas of the Canadian Soccer League. In 1990, he moved to Europe to play for AaB Aalborg. Iversen was back in the United States in 1991 to play for the Miami Freedom of the American Professional Soccer League. In 1992, he returned to California where he would spend the rest of his career. He began by joining the San Francisco Bay Blackhawks. In 1994, he played for the Silicon Valley Firebirds in the USISL. In 1996, Iversen signed with the San Jose Clash of Major League Soccer. He never played for the Clash, but went on loan to the Reno Rattlers. On October 2, 1996, the Clash waived Iversen. In 1997 and 1998, Iversen finished his career with the California Jaguars.
