= 2018 NCAA Division II men's soccer tournament =

2018 NCAA Division II Men's Soccer Championship
Tournament details
- Country: United States
- Dates: November 8 - December 1, 2018
- Teams: 36

Final positions
- Champions: Barry (1st title, 2nd final)
- Runner-up: West Chester (PA) (1st final)

Tournament statistics
- Matches played: 37

Awards
- Best player: Offense: Francisco Greco, Barry; Defense: Stephen Kosmala, Barry
- All statistics correct as of 12/01/2018.

The 2018 NCAA Division II Men's Soccer Championship was the 47th annual single-elimination tournament to determine the national champion of NCAA Division II men's collegiate soccer in the United States. The semifinals and championship game were played at Highmark Stadium in Pittsburgh, Pennsylvania from November 29–December 1, 2018, while the preceding rounds were played at various sites across the country during November 2018.

The Barry Buccaneers defeated West Chester, 2–1, in the DII College Cup Final. James Kirkham and Steven Kosmala scored goals in the final 12 minutes of the second half to give the Buccaneers the school's first men's soccer national title. Barry, who finished the season 16-4-3, were coached by Steve McCrath.

== Tournament bracket ==
=== Super Region No. 1 ===
First Round; Thursday & Friday, November 8 & 9
4	Le Moyne	1
5	Wilmington (DE)	4
6	Post	0
3	Mercy	1

Second Round; Saturday & Sunday, November 10 & 11
1	Adelphi	2
5	Wilmington (DE)	1
2	LIU Post	1
3	Mercy	1
1	Charleston	1
4	Millersville	0
2	West Chester	2
3	Notre Dame (OH)	1

Third Round; Thursday, November 15
1	Adelphi	2
2	LIU Post	0
1	Charleston	0
2	West Chester	1

Quarterfinals; Saturday, November 17
1	Adelphi	0
2	West Chester	2

=== Super Region No. 2 ===
First Round; Thursday, November 8
4	Fresno Pacific	0
5	Cal Poly Pomona	3
6	Chico State	1
3	Cal State LA	2

Second Round; Saturday, Sunday & Monday, November 10, 11 & 12
1	Simon Fraser	0
5	Cal Poly Pomona	1
3	Cal State LA	1
2	Azusa Pacific	2
1	Midwestern State	0(4)
4	Colorado Mesa	0(5)
3	West Texas A&M	2
2	Colorado School of Mines	0

Third Round; Thursday, November 15
5	Cal Poly Pomona	1
2	Azusa Pacific	0
4	Colorado Mesa	0
3	West Texas A&M	1

Quarterfinals; Saturday, November 17
5	Cal Poly Pomona	2
3	West Texas A&M	0

=== Super Region No. 3 ===
First Round; Thursday & Friday, November 8 & 9
4	Ohio Valley	2
5	Maryville (MO)	1
6	Ashland	3
3	Saginaw Valley State	4

Second Round; Saturday & Sunday, November 10 & 11
1	Tiffin	1(1)
4	Ohio Valley	1(4)
3	Saginaw Valley State	4
2	Southern Indiana	1

Third Round; Thursday, November 15
4	Ohio Valley	1
3	Saginaw Valley State	0
1	Fort Hays State	3
2	Northeastern State	1

Quarterfinals; Saturday, November 17
4	Ohio Valley	0
1	Fort Hays State	2

=== Super Region No. 4 ===
First Round; Friday, November 9
4	Tusculum	3
5	Queens	2
6	Anderson	3
3	Limestone	2

Second Round; Saturday & Sunday, November 10 & 11
1	Palm Beach Atlantic	1(4)
4	Lynn	1(5)
3	Barry	4
2	Spring Hill	1
1	Young Harris	2
4	Tusculum	1
6	Anderson	0
2	Lander	1

Third Round; Friday, November 16
4	Lynn	0(2)
3	Barry	0(4)
1	Young Harris	0
2	Lander	1

Quarterfinals; Sunday, November 18
3	Barry	2
2	Lander	1

=== Division II College Cup ===
Semifinals; November 29, 2018; Highmark Stadium; Pittsburgh, Pennsylvania
1	Fort Hays State	0(4)
4	Barry	0(5)
2	Cal Poly Pomona	1
3	West Chester	2(OT)

Championship; December 1, 2018; Highmark Stadium; Pittsburgh, Pennsylvania
4	Barry	2
3	West Chester	1

== Final ==
December 1, 2018
12:00 EST (UTC−5)

Barry	2–1	West Chester (PA)
James Kirkham 77:55' (Greco); Steven Kosmala 83:34'	Report A Report B	Jason Pixley 24:39' (Miller); Brett Miller (yellow card) 55:14'

Highmark Stadium, Pittsburgh, Pennsylvania
Attendance: 396
Referee: Mike Lavergne
