= 1994 NCAA Division I men's soccer tournament =

Men's College Cup (semifinals & final)

Tournament details
- Country: United States
- Teams: 32

Final positions
- Champions: Virginia (5th title)
- Runners-up: Indiana (8th title game)

Tournament statistics
- Matches played: 31
- Goals scored: 104 (3.35 per match)
- Attendance: 92,186 (2,974 per match)
- Top goal scorer(s): A.J. Wood, Virginia (5)

The 1994 NCAA Division I Men's Soccer Tournament was the 35th organized men's college soccer tournament by the National Collegiate Athletic Association, to determine the top college soccer team in the United States. The Virginia Cavaliers won their fifth national title, and fourth straight, by defeating the Indiana Hoosiers in the championship game, 1–0. For the first time, the top four teams from the regular season were seeded nationally for the tournament bracket. This was also the first tournament to see more than 100 goals scored during its entirety. The final match was played on December 11, 1994, in Davidson, North Carolina, at Richardson Stadium for the third straight year. All other matches were played at the home field of the higher seeded team.

== National Seeds ==
National Seeds
Seed	School	Record
#1	Indiana	19–2
#2	Boston University	18–0–1
#3	Virginia	17–3–1
#4	Charlotte	16–3

== Early rounds ==
First round
1	Indiana (2OT)	1
Notre Dame	0
Creighton	2
Saint Louis	1
Fresno State	1
San Francisco (pen.)	1
San Diego	1
Cal State Fullerton (2OT)	3
SMU	2
Wisconsin	1
UAB	2
UCLA (2OT)	3
South Carolina	0
NC State	1
College of Charleston (4OT)	1
4	Charlotte	0
3	Virginia (2OT)	3
UNC Greensboro	0
Maryland (2OT)	4
Georgetown	3
North Carolina	0
James Madison	3
Duke (2OT)	2
FIU	1
Rutgers	1
St. John's (NY)	0
Robert Morris	0
Penn State	3
Brown (2OT)	3
New Hampshire	2
Harvard	0
2	Boston U.	2

Second round
1	Indiana	1
Creighton	0
San Francisco	0
Cal State Fullerton (2OT)	1
SMU	2
UCLA	4
NC State	4
College of Charleston (3OT)	5
3	Virginia	2
Maryland	1
James Madison	2
Duke	1
Rutgers (2OT)	3
Penn State	2
Brown	3
2	Boston U.	2

Third round
1	Indiana	2
Cal State Fullerton	1
UCLA	3
College of Charleston	2
3	Virginia	4
James Madison	1
Rutgers	3
Brown	1

Semifinals
1	Indiana	4
UCLA	1
3	Virginia	2
Rutgers	1

Championship; Richardson Stadium; Davidson, North Carolina
1	Indiana	0
3	Virginia	1

== Final ==
December 11, 1994

Indiana	0–1	Virginia
	Report	Wood 21'

Richardson Stadium, Davidson, NC
Attendance: 12,033

== See also ==
- 1994 NCAA Division II men's soccer tournament
- 1994 NCAA Division III men's soccer tournament
- 1994 NCAA Division I women's soccer tournament
- 1994 NAIA men's soccer tournament
