= Pfeiffer Falcons =

- University: Pfeiffer University
- Nickname: Falcons
- NCAA: Division III
- Conference: USA South
- Athletic director: Zac Chilton (Interim)
- Location: Misenheimer, North Carolina
- Varsity teams: 18 (10 men's, 8 women's)
- Basketball arena: Merner Gym
- Baseball stadium: Joe Ferebee Field
- Softball stadium: Jack Ingram Field
- Soccer stadium: N. E. Lefko Field
- Aquatics center: Merner Gym Natatorium
- Lacrosse stadium: N. E. Lefko Field
- Golf course: Old North State Club; Tillery Tradition County Club
- Tennis venue: Knapp Tennis Center
- Colors: Black and Gold
- Website: gofalconsports.com
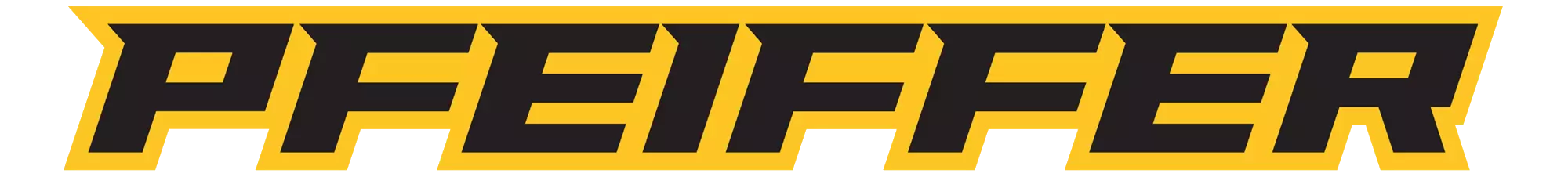

Team NCAA championships
- 2

Individual and relay NCAA champions
- 1

The Pfeiffer Falcons are the athletic teams that represent Pfeiffer University, located in Misenheimer, North Carolina, in intercollegiate sports at the Division III ranks of the National Collegiate Athletic Association (NCAA). The Falcons have primarily competed in the USA South Athletic Conference (USA South) since the 2017–18 academic year. The Falcons previously competed in the Conference Carolinas (CC) of the Division II ranks from 1960–61 to 2016–17.

== Conference affiliations ==
NCAA Division II

- Conference Carolinas (1960–2017)

NCAA Division III

- USA South Athletic Conference (2017–present)

== Varsity teams ==
Men's sports	Women's sports
Baseball	Basketball
Basketball	Cross country
Cross country	Golf
Golf	Lacrosse
Lacrosse	Soccer
Soccer	Softball
Tennis	Tennis
Track and field	Track and field
	Volleyball

== National championships ==
The 1981 Women's Field Hockey team became Pfeiffer's first team to win a National Championship.

Steven Armstrong of Edinburgh, Scotland became Pfeiffer's first individual National Champion in 1995 winning the NAIA National Golf Championship at Bailey Ranch, Tulsa, Oklahoma.

In 2009, varsity student-cyclist Joey Rosskopf won the overall Division II national road cycling championships.

For the first time in Pfeiffer men's soccer history the Falcons are National Champions, finishing the season a perfect 25–0. The Falcons dominated Cal Poly Pomona by a score of 4–0. Pfeiffer's four goals was the second-most in an NCAA Division II championship game, and the Falcons recorded the first title game shutout since 2009. The Falcons become the first undefeated champion in Division II men's soccer since Southern Connecticut State posted a 20–0 mark in 1999. The only other team to go unbeaten and untied was Lock Haven in 1980, who went 21–0.

=== Team ===
Sport	Association	Division	Year	Opponent	Score
Field Hockey (1)	NCAA	Division II	1981	Bentley	5–3
Men's Soccer (1)	NCAA	Division II	2015	Cal Poly Pomona	4–0

=== Individual ===
Sport	Association	Division	Year	Individual(s)	Event
Men's Golf	NCAA	Division II	2003	(Scotland) Andrew McArthur	Individual Title
