= Torodome =

Indoor sports venue on the campus of California State University Dominguez Hills

- Interactive map of Torodome
- Full name: Torodome Gymnasium
- Address: 1000 East Victoria Street; Carson, California
- Location: Dignity Health Sports Park
- Coordinates: 33.8625°N 118.2558°W
- Elevation: 139.5 ft (42.5 m)
- Owner: California State University, Dominguez Hills
- Seating type: Bleachers (retractable)
- Capacity: 4,100
- Type: Gymnasium
- Event: Sporting events
- Surface: Polished hardwood
- Scoreboard: Yes
- Public transit: LA Metro Bus Line 53; Victoria/Tamcliff stop

Construction
- Opened: 1970

Tenants
- CSUDH Toros (NCAA) CIF LA City Section: 1972–

Website
- gotoros.com/facilities/torodome/1

The Torodome is a 4,100 seat multi-purpose arena in Carson, California. It primarily serves as the home of the Cal State Dominguez Hills Toros basketball teams. It is also host every spring to the California Interscholastic Federation Los Angeles City section basketball championships. The Torodome has also been used for CSUDH graduation ceremonies and various other regional sporting events.
