= Patricia Morrison (disambiguation) =

Patricia Morrison (born 1962) is an American bass guitarist, singer and songwriter.

Patricia Morrison (or Morison) may also refer to:

- Patricia Morison (1915–2018), American actress/singer
- Patricia Kennealy-Morrison (1946–2021), American author
- Patt Morrison (born 1952), American journalist
- Patricia Morrison (historian) (1921–2011), member of the New Zealand China Friendship Society
