= Chris Joyce (footballer) =

English footballer

Personal information
- Place of birth: Newcastle upon Tyne, England, United Kingdom
- Height: 1.89 m (6 ft 2 in)
- Position: Striker

Team information
- Current team: Tollnes

Youth career
- Newcastle United

College career
Years	Team	Apps	(Gls)
2004–2006	Franklin Pierce Ravens	50	(51)

Senior career*
Years	Team	Apps	(Gls)
- Blyth Spartans
2006–2008	Odd Grenland	22	(2)
2007	→ Nybergsund (loan)	14	(13)
2008	→ Pors Grenland (loan)		
2009	Pors Grenland	28	(22)
2010–2011	Asker	33	(6)
2011–2012	Notodden	0	(0)
2012	Pors Grenland	24	(8)
2013–	Tollnes	78	(21)
2014–	Tollnes 2	4	(0)
- * Club domestic league appearances and goals as of 16:39, 25 January 2019 (UTC)

Chris Joyce is an English footballer who plays as a striker for Norwegian club Tollnes. He has previously played for Odd Grenland in Tippeligaen.

== Career ==
Joyce was born in Newcastle upon Tyne, England, where he grew up supporting Newcastle United, and watched every home-match for 10 years when he had a season pass. He joined Newcastle United's academy at the age of 11, where he played together with Shola Ameobi, but when Joyce turned 16 he was not offered a contract with the Magpies. He attended Loughborough University for the next three years, and played as a striker for the university team where he scored approximately 20 goals per season, in addition to playing non-League football for Blyth Spartans.

Joyce studied economy at Franklin Pierce University in the United States, and became a goal-getter for the college soccer team with 51 goals in 50 games. He was offered a contract with FC Dallas in February 2006 after training with the club, but chose to move to Norway and signed a three-year contract with Odd Grenland in March 2006. Joyce played 22 matches and scored two goals for Odd Grenland in Tippeligaen, until he was loaned out to Nybergsund-Trysil in the second half of the 2007 season where he scored seven goals in nine matches in the Second Division. Joyce spent the 2008 season on loan to Pors Grenland, but after his contract with Odd Grenland was terminated in July 2008 he decided to take a break from professional football.

Joyce returned to Pors Grenland ahead of the 2009 season, and scored 20 goals for the club in the Second Division, before he joined Asker in 2010. After one season with Asker, he was retrained as a centre back. Joyce signed a contract with Notodden in November 2012 but before he played any matches for Notodden he joined Pors Grenland in February 2012 as assistant playing-coach, because he had gotten a new job in Porsgrunn

In 2013, he joined Tollnes where he has continued to play and coach ever since.

== Personal life ==
Joyce met his future wife three months after arriving in Norway and has since raised three children in the country.
