= Cliff McCrath =

American soccer player and coach

Personal information
- Full name: Charles Clifford McCrath
- Date of birth: February 3, 1936 (age 90)
- Place of birth: Detroit, Michigan, U.S.

College career
Years	Team	Apps	(Gls)
1955–1957	Wheaton Thunder		

Managerial career
- 1958: Wheaton Thunder
- 1960–1966: Gordon Fighting Scots
- 1967–1969: Spring Arbor Cougars
- 1970–2007: Seattle Pacific Falcons
- 2017: United States Universiade (women)

Charles Clifford McCrath (born February 3, 1936) is an American retired soccer player and coach. His greatest fame came as coach of Seattle Pacific University where he led the team to five NCAA Division II championships. He was the 1978 NSCAA Coach of the Year and retired ranked second on the all time collegiate coaching wins list with 597 wins.

McCrath grew up in Michigan as an avid hockey fan. He had originally intended to attend Michigan State to play hockey, but attendance at a revival changed his mind and he entered Wheaton College in 1954. That year, he saw soccer played for the first time. Intrigued, he tried out for the team his sophomore year. Despite his late introduction to the game, he quickly rose to the top of the collegiate ranks when he was named an Honorable Mention (third team) All American in 1957. He graduated in the spring of 1958 and remained at Wheaton that fall to coach the team. McCrath was inducted into the Wheaton College Athletic Hall of Fame in 1979. In 1960, Gordon College in Wenham, Massachusetts hired McCrath. Over seven seasons, he took the NAIA Fighting Scots to a 52–26–2 record, four post season tournaments and the 1966 NAIA semifinals. That year, he graduated with an M.Div. from the Gordon Divinity School. In 1967, he moved to Spring Arbor College where he inherited a mediocre team. In his first season, he went 4–4–0, but quickly improved as the Cougars went to the NAIA post season in 1968 and 1969. In 1969, he again took his team to the semifinals. This brought him to the attention of David McKenna, president of Seattle Pacific University, a sister school to Spring Arbor. McKenna was looking to upgrade the SPU soccer program and consequently hired McCrath. McCrath's team again had a poor first season, going 0–7–3. However, the next year, he took the Falcons to a 7–3–4 record and the regional post-season tournament. He improved in 1972 as the Falcons made it into the NCAA post-season tournament. At the time, an investment group began laying the foundation for the establishment of a North American Soccer League franchise in Seattle, eventually to be known as the Seattle Sounders. They approached McCrath about coaching the team, but he declined. Instead, he worked with the team ownership to hire John Best as the team's first coach. McCrath then did much of the early work scouting players and assembling a roster. Once the team began playing in 1974, he worked as a color commentator for local broadcasts of Sounders’ games. He did not slight his collegiate coaching duties and took Seattle Pacific to the NCAA Division II championship game in 1974, 1975 and 1977. Each time, the team finished as runner-up. In 1978, the Falcons finally took the title and McCrath was named the National Coach of the Year. The Falcons won the championship again in 1983, 1985, 1986 and 1993 and finished as runner-up in 1984 and 1990. In 2007, the Falcons finished 7–6–7. This disappointing result led to his dismissal as coach at the end of the season.

In 2017, McCrath served as the head coach for the U.S. women's soccer team participating in the women's soccer tournament at the 2017 Summer Universiade in Taipei.
