= 2012 NCAA Division II men's soccer tournament =

2012 NCAA Division II Men's Soccer Championship
Men's Division II College Cup (semifinals & final)

Tournament details
- Country: United States
- Teams: 35

Final positions
- Champions: Lynn University (2nd title, 4th final)
- Runners-up: Saginaw Valley State University (1st final)

Tournament statistics
- Matches played: 34
- Goals scored: 100 (2.94 per match)

The 2012 NCAA Division II Men's Soccer Championship featured 35 schools in four unbalanced Super-Regional tournaments involving seven to ten teams each. Super-Regional games were played at campus sites.

The Division II College Cup was held at Blanchard Woods Park in Evans, Georgia and was hosted by the Peach Belt Conference.

In the national semifinals, Mercyhurst (17-6-1) was defeated by Lynn 4-1, and Simon Fraser (19-2-1) fell to Saginaw Valley 3-1. Lynn (19-3-1) won its second Division II crown by beating Saginaw Valley (18-3-4) 3-2 in the national final.

== East Super-Regional ==
First Round; Friday, November 9
Mass-Lowell	3
Post	1
Merrimack	1
Franklin Pierce	0

Second Round; Sunday, November 11
LIU Post	0
Mass-Lowell	1
Southern N.H.	1
Merrimack	0
Gannon	2
Davis & Elkins	1
Charleston (WV)	0
Mercyhurst	1

Third Round; Thursday, November 15
Mass-Lowell	0
Southern N.H.	2
Gannon	1
Mercyhurst	2

Quarterfinals; Saturday, November 17
Southern N.H.	1
Mercyhurst	2

== Midwest Super-Regional ==
First Round; Friday, November 9
Notre Dame (OH)	3
Drury	0

Second Round; Sunday, November 11
Rockhurst	3
Notre Dame (OH)	2
Saginaw Valley (PK 6-5)	1
Quincy	1

Third Round; Friday, November 16
Rockhurst	1
Saginaw Valley	2
Northeastern State	6
Ft. Hays State	3

Quarterfinals; Saturday, November 17
Saginaw Valley	1
Northeastern State	0

== South Super-Regional ==
First Round; Friday, November 9
Wingate	3
Montevallo	1
Mars Hill	2
UNC Pembroke	3

Second Round; Saturday, November 11
Lynn	1
Tampa	0
Lander	1
Wingate	2
Flagler (PK4-2)	0
UNC Pembroke	0

Third Round; Thursday, November 15
Rollins	1
Lynn	2
Wingate	2
Flagler	1

Quarterfinals; Saturday, November 17
Lynn	2
Wingate	0

== West Super-Regional ==
First Round; Thursday, November 8
Cal State, Stanislaus	3
Notre Dame de Namur	2
Seattle Pacific	1
Cal State, L.A. (PK 5-4)	1

Second Round; Saturday, November 10
Simon Fraser	2
Cal State, Stanislaus	1
Grand Canyon (PK 5-4)	1
Cal State, L.A.	1
Colorado Mines	2
Incarnate Word	4

Third Round; Thursday, November 15
Simon Fraser	2
Grand Canyon	1
Regis (CO)	0
Incarnate Word	1

Quarterfinals; Saturday, November 17
Simon Fraser	1
Incarnate Word	0

== Division II College Cup at Evans, Ga. ==
National Semifinals; November 29
Mercyhurst	1
Lynn	4
Saginaw Valley	3
Simon Fraser	1

National Championship; December 1
Lynn	3
Saginaw Valley	2

Attendance: Semi #1 = 182; Semi #2 = 213; Final = 311

== Final ==
December 1, 2012
12:00 PM

Lynn	3–2	Saginaw Valley
Johnny Myrtl 2:07' (Winter); Jake Furman (yellow card) 36:38'; Yannick Braeuer 40:19'; Anthony Desperito 66:45' (Winter)	Report 1 Report 2	Mitch Posuniak (yellow card) 40:14'; Zach Walega 77:16'; Lachlan Savage (yellow card) 78:00', (goal) 82:15' (Minor)

Blanchard Woods Park, Evans, Georgia
Attendance: 311
Referee: Mark Kadlecik
