= Barry Buccaneers =

- University: Barry University
- NCAA: Division II
- Conference: Sunshine State (primary)
- Athletic director: Dr. Scott Smith
- Location: Miami Shores, Florida
- Varsity teams: 18 (7 men's, 10 women's, 1 co-ed)
- Basketball arena: Health & Sports Center
- Baseball stadium: Feinbloom Field
- Softball stadium: Buccaneer Softball Field
- Soccer stadium: Buccaneer Soccer Field
- Tennis venue: Buccaneer Tennis Center
- Nickname: Buccaneers
- Colors: Red, black, and silver
- Mascot: Bucky the Parrot
- Website: gobarrybucs.com
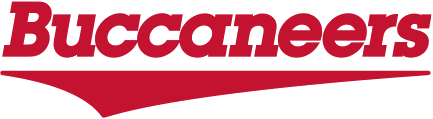

Team NCAA championships
- 26

The Barry Buccaneers are the athletic teams that represent Barry University, located in Miami Shores, Florida, United States, in NCAA Division II intercollegiate sports. The Buccaneers compete as members of the Sunshine State Conference. Barry has been a member of the SSC since 1988. Barry University currently competes in 20 intercollegiate NCAA varsity sports for men and women, with men's volleyball the most recent addition in 2024–25. Barry plans to add men's and women's lacrosse in 2027.

The Sunshine State Conference does not sponsor men's volleyball. Barry competes for the NCAA national championship, which includes both Division I and II teams, as an independent in that sport.

== History ==
Within the first 33 years of Buccaneer Athletics, Barry won 18 national championships. Barry has won 66 SSC titles in 14 different sports since it joined the SSC in 1988. They are the only conference school to hold a league title in all 12 sports that they have sponsored. The Buccaneers have also won the SSC Women's Mayor's Cup All-Sports Trophy on five occasions, in 1990–91, 1996–97, 1999–00, 2001–02 and 2005–06. In 2006–07, the Buccaneer men finally claimed a Mayor's Cup of their own, as none of the five teams finished outside the top three in the conference. The men were co-winners in 2008-09 for their second cup and took their third in 2010–11.

== Sports sponsored ==
Men's sports	Women's sports
Baseball	Basketball
Basketball	Beach volleyball
Cross country	Cross country
Golf	Golf
Soccer	Rowing
Swimming	Soccer
Tennis	Softball
Track & field	Swimming
Volleyball	Track & field
	Tennis
Volleyball
The men's and women's track & field teams compete outdoors only.

== Championships ==
As of the 2019–20 season, Barry has won 22 national championships. Of those, women's soccer, volleyball, men's golf, men's tennis and women's tennis each claimed three titles, while rowing won a brace and women's golf captured their first. Men's tennis became the first sport at Barry to win NCAA championships during undefeated seasons, doing so twice, in 2013 and 2015. Women's tennis set the program record for a perfect season in 2017, going 30–0.

=== Team championships ===
Association	Division	Sport	Year	Opponent/runner-up	Score
NCAA (26)	Division II (26)	Men's Golf (3)	2007	USC Upstate	1,186–1,187
NCAA (26)	Division II (26)	Men's Golf (3)	2013	Lynn	2-2-1
NCAA (26)	Division II (26)	Men's Golf (3)	2014	Nova Southeastern	3-1-1
NCAA (26)	Division II (26)	Women's Golf (1)	2017	Dallas Baptist	1,222-1,223
NCAA (26)	Division II (26)	Women's Rowing (2)	2015	Mercyhurst	20-15
NCAA (26)	Division II (26)	Women's Rowing (2)	2016	Central Oklahoma	20-15
NCAA (26)	Division II (26)	Men's Soccer (1)	2018	West Chester	2–1
NCAA (26)	Division II (26)	Women's Soccer (3)	1989	Keene State	4-0
NCAA (26)	Division II (26)	Women's Soccer (3)	1992	Adelphi	3-2
NCAA (26)	Division II (26)	Women's Soccer (3)	1993	Cal Poly San Luis Obispo	2-0
NCAA (26)	Division II (26)	Men's tennis (6)	2010	Valdosta State	5-4
NCAA (26)	Division II (26)	Men's tennis (6)	2013	Armstrong Atlantic	5-4
NCAA (26)	Division II (26)	Men's tennis (6)	2015	Hawaii Pacific	5-3
NCAA (26)	Division II (26)	Men's tennis (6)	2019	Columbus State	4-3
NCAA (26)	Division II (26)	Men's tennis (6)	2021	Columbus State	4-1
NCAA (26)	Division II (26)	Men's tennis (6)	2022	Wayne State	4-1
NCAA (26)	Division II (26)	Women's Tennis (7)	2011	Lynn	5-2
NCAA (26)	Division II (26)	Women's Tennis (7)	2014	Armstrong Atlantic	5-4
NCAA (26)	Division II (26)	Women's Tennis (7)	2017	Lynn	5-0
NCAA (26)	Division II (26)	Women's Tennis (7)	2018	West Florida	5-0
NCAA (26)	Division II (26)	Women's Tennis (7)	2019	Lynn	4-2
NCAA (26)	Division II (26)	Women's Tennis (7)	2021	UIndy	4-0
NCAA (26)	Division II (26)	Women's Tennis (7)	2022	Central Oklahoma	4-1
NCAA (26)	Division II (26)	Volleyball (3)	1995	Northern Michigan	3-1
NCAA (26)	Division II (26)	Volleyball (3)	2001	South Dakota State	3-0
NCAA (26)	Division II (26)	Volleyball (3)	2004	Truman	3-1

== Notable alumni ==
Multiple alumni of Barry's baseball team have gone on to play Major League Baseball, including pitcher Henry Owens, catcher Yan Gomes, pitcher Tyler Kinley, and second baseman Alex De Goti. MLB pitcher Josh James also briefly attended Barry before transferring to Western Oklahoma State College.
