= Florida Tech Panthers =

- University: Florida Institute of Technology
- Conference: Sunshine State (primary)
- NCAA: Division II
- Athletic director: Jamie Joss
- Location: Melbourne, Florida
- Varsity teams: 15 (8 men's, 6 women's, 1 co-ed)
- Basketball arena: Charles and Ruth Clemente Center
- Baseball stadium: Andy Seminick-Les Hall Field
- Softball stadium: Nancy Bottge Field
- Soccer field: Rick Stottler Field
- Aquatics center: Panther Aquatic Center
- Lacrosse field: Panther Field (men's); Rick Stottler Field (women's)
- Nickname: Panthers
- Colors: Crimson and Gray
- Website: floridatechsports.com
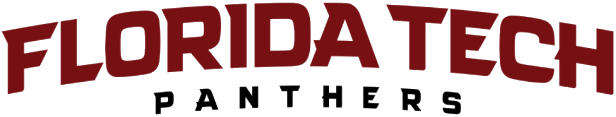

Team NCAA championships
- 4

The Florida Tech Panthers are the athletic teams that represent the Florida Institute of Technology, located in Melbourne, Florida, in intercollegiate athletics in NCAA Division II, primarily competing in the Sunshine State Conference since the 1981–82 academic year.

Sports currently offered by the program include baseball, softball, men's cross country, men's track and field (both indoor and outdoor), women's volleyball, men's and women's basketball, men's and women's lacrosse, men's rowing, men's and women's soccer, and men's and women's swimming.

Due to financial difficulties, the women's golf and the men's and women's tennis programs were canceled in the spring of 2019. The men's football program was also canceled in the spring of 2020. Other sports formerly offered by the program include men's golf, men's and women's cross country, women's rowing, and women's track field (both indoor and outdoor).

== Varsity sports ==
Men's sports	Women's sports
Baseball	Basketball
Basketball	Lacrosse
Cross-country	Soccer
Lacrosse	Softball
Rowing	Swimming
Soccer	Volleyball
Ice hockey	Swimming
Track and field^{†}	
† – Track includes both indoor and outdoor

=== Baseball ===
Florida Tech has had nine Major League Baseball draft selections since the draft began in 1965.

Year	Player	Round	Team
1988	Tim Wakefield	8	Pirates
2006	Jonathan Baksh	7	Blue Jays
2007	Steven Condotta	12	Blue Jays
2011	Jonathan Cornelius	24	Cardinals
2012	Steven Schils	9	Braves
2012	K.C. Clabough	28	Braves
2013	Scott Carcaise	14	Marlins
2015	Austin Allen	4	Padres
2018	Ty Cohen	31	Cardinals

=== Basketball ===
Florida Tech's college basketball teams compete in the Sunshine State Conference, a very competitive NCAA DII conference with schools like Florida Southern that have won national championships. In response to this, Florida Tech occasionally plays higher caliber Florida DI schools such as Florida State, Florida Gulf Coast, and Florida Atlantic. In 2011–12, the men's team, coached by Billy Mims, won the SSC regular-season championship with a record of 21–5 (12–4 SSC) and reached the NCAA tournament, where they advanced to the second round of the South Regional. That year, they played two DI schools UAB and UCF, losing to both.

The Panther women's team has been playing since the 1986–87 season and has been coached by John Reynolds since 1987–88. The Panther women have reached the NCAA Division II women's basketball tournament nine times, won six regular-season Sunshine State Conference championships, four SSC tournament championships, one NCAA Division II South Region title and appeared in the NCAA Division II Elite Eight in 2002. Entering the 2018–19 season, Reynolds' 559 wins ranks him at No. 8 among active DII women's coaches and 20th all-time.

Clemente Center is Florida Tech's basketball venue.

=== Football ===
The football program was the intercollegiate American football team for Florida Institute of Technology located in the U.S. state of Florida. The team competed in the NCAA Division II and was a member of the Gulf South Conference. Florida Tech's first football team was fielded in 2013. They played at the Florida Tech Panther Stadium. The football program closed after the 2019 season.

== National championships ==
=== Team ===
Association	Division	Sport	Year	Opponent/Runner-up	Score
NCAA	Division II	Men's soccer	1988	Cal State Northridge	3–2
NCAA	Division II	Men's soccer	1991	Sonoma State	5–1
NCAA	Division II	Women's golf	2019	Cal State San Marcos	4–1
NCAA	Division II	Women's soccer	2025	Franklin Pierce University	3–0
