= Cal State Dominguez Hills Toros =

- University: California State University, Dominguez Hills
- NCAA: Division II
- Conference: CCAA (primary)
- Athletic director: Brett Waterfield
- Location: Carson, California
- Varsity teams: 9 (4 men's, 5 women's)
- Basketball arena: Torodome
- Baseball stadium: Toro Field
- Softball stadium: Toro Diamond
- Soccer stadium: Toro Stadium
- Nickname: Toros
- Colors: Cardinal and gold
- Mascot: Teddy Toro
- Website: gotoros.com

Team NCAA championships
- 3

Individual and relay NCAA champions
- 1

The Cal State Dominguez Hills Toros (also CSU Dominguez Hills Toros, CSUDH Toros, and California State-Dominguez Hills Toros) are the athletic teams that represent California State University, Dominguez Hills, located in Carson, California, in NCAA Division II intercollegiate sports. The Toros compete as members of the California Collegiate Athletic Association for all 9 varsity sports.

The men's soccer team plays at Toro Stadium (capacity 3,000). Other sports venues for the university are the Torodome (capacity 3,602) for basketball and volleyball; Toro Field (capacity 300) for baseball; and Toro Diamond (capacity 300) for softball. Select home games are nationally televised live via Internet TV. Even though Dignity Health Sports Park, home of the Los Angeles Galaxy, is located on the campus of CSUDH the Toros do not play there.

== Individual teams ==
| Men's sports | Women's sports |
|---|---|
| Baseball | Basketball |
| Basketball | Soccer |
| Golf | Softball |
| Soccer | Track and field^{†} |
| | Volleyball |
† – Track and field includes both indoor and outdoor.

=== Baseball ===
Kevin Pillar played center field for the Toros baseball team, for which he was an All-American. In 2010, as a junior he set an NCAA Division II record at the school, with a 54-game hitting streak. In August 2013, he became a major leaguer, for the Toronto Blue Jays. Bubby Rossman ('14) played for the team, and became a major league baseball pitcher for the Philadelphia Phillies in 2022.

=== Soccer ===
The men's soccer won its second national NCAA Division II championship in a match against Dowling College on December 7, 2008 at the University of Tampa’s Pepin Stadium. The women's soccer team won an NCAA Division II title in 1991. It is the alma mater of Sierra Leone Player Kei Kamara.

=== Track & Field ===
The university's most notable athlete alumna is the fastest woman in the world, sprinter Carmelita Jeter (Class of ’06, B.A., kinesiology), who is a 2012 Olympic bronze, silver and gold medalist.

=== Golf ===
The university's men's golf team has won the 2015, 2016, 2018, & 2019 PGA Works Collegiate Golf Championships, a National Championship open to Historically Minority Colleges.

== Championships ==
=== Appearances ===
The CSU Dominguez Hills Toros competed in the NCAA Tournament across 9 active sports (4 men's and 5 women's) 72 times at the Division II level.

- Baseball (5): 1986, 1987, 1994, 2009, 2010
- Men's basketball (6): 1981, 1987, 1989, 2009, 2011, 2025
- Women's basketball (7): 1995, 1996, 2005, 2007, 2009, 2014, 2015
- Men's golf (2): 1985, 1989
- Men's soccer (14): 1982, 2000, 2001, 2002, 2003, 2004, 2005, 2006, 2007, 2008, 2009, 2011, 2015, 2017
- Women's soccer (12): 1989, 1991, 1997, 1998, 1999, 2001, 2003, 2004, 2005, 2007, 2008, 2009
- Softball (9): 1982, 1989, 2003, 2004, 2005, 2006, 2008, 2012, 2013
- Women's indoor track and field (5): 2003, 2005, 2006, 2009, 2012
- Women's outdoor track and field (13): 1985, 1999, 2000, 2002, 2003, 2004, 2005, 2006, 2007, 2009, 2010, 2011, 2012

=== Team ===
The Toros of CSU Dominguez Hills earned 3 NCAA team championships at the Division II level.

- Men's (2)
  - Soccer (2): 2000, 2008
- Women's (1)
  - Soccer (1): 1991

Results

| School year | Sport | Opponent | Score |
|---|---|---|---|
| 1991–92 | Women's soccer | Sonoma State | 2–1 |
| 2000–01 | Men's soccer | Barry | 2–1 |
| 2008–09 | Men's soccer | Dowling | 3–0 |

Below are two national club team championships:

- Men's badminton (2): 1975, 1979 (ABA)

=== Individual ===
CSU Dominguez Hills had 1 Toro win an NCAA individual championship at the Division II level.

NCAA individual championships
| Order | School year | Athlete(s) | Sport | Source |
|---|---|---|---|---|
| 1 | 2010–11 | Breionna Jackson; Chanel Parker; Dora Baldwin; Nancy Blake | Women's outdoor track and field | |
