= Dowling Golden Lions =

- University: Dowling College
- Conference: ECC
- NCAA: Division II
- Location: Oakdale, New York
- Varsity teams: 15
- Basketball arena: Dowling Gymnasium
- Baseball stadium: Golden Lions Field
- Mascot: Rory
- Nickname: Golden Lions
- Colors: Navy and Gold
- Website: www.dowlingathletics.com

The Dowling Golden Lions were the athletic teams that represented Dowling College, located in Oakdale, New York on Long Island, in intercollegiate sports as a member of the Division II ranks of the National Collegiate Athletic Association (NCAA), primarily competing in the East Coast Conference (ECC; formerly known as the New York Collegiate Athletic Conference (NYCAC) until spring 2005–06) from 1989–90 to 2015–16 for all sports (with the exception of men's golf and field hockey, which competed as independents).

== Varsity teams ==
Dowling competed in 15 intercollegiate varsity sports: Men's sports included baseball, basketball, cross country, golf, lacrosse, soccer and tennis; while women's sports included basketball, cross country, field hockey, lacrosse, soccer, softball, tennis and volleyball. The school also offered cheerleading as a club sport.

=== National championships ===
In 2010, Dowling College's Men's Soccer, Men's Lacrosse, and Women's Volleyball teams all claimed NCAA Division II regional championships.

Association	Division	Sport	Year	Event	Opponent
NCAA	Division II	Men's Soccer	2006	Team	Fort Lewis
NCAA	Division II	Men's Lacrosse	2012	Team	Limestone

== Individual teams ==
=== Baseball ===
The Dowling baseball team earned a Division II regional championship in 2009, advancing to the Division II World Series.

=== Lacrosse ===
The Dowling's men's lacrosse team won the NCAA Division II National Championship in 2012.

=== Soccer ===
The Dowling's men's soccer team won the NCAA Division II National Championship in 2006, and again made it to the National Championship game in 2008.
