= Lynn Fighting Knights =

College athletic team in Florida

- University: Lynn University
- Conference: Sunshine State (primary)
- NCAA: Division II
- Athletic director: Kathy Kroupa
- Location: Boca Raton, Florida
- Varsity teams: 19 (9 men's, 10 women's)
- Basketball arena: de Hoernle Sports & Cultural Center
- Baseball stadium: Lynn Baseball Field
- Soccer stadium: Bobby Campbell Stadium
- Aquatics center: McCusker Pool Complex
- Nickname: Fighting Knights
- Colors: Blue and White
- Website: lynnfightingknights.com
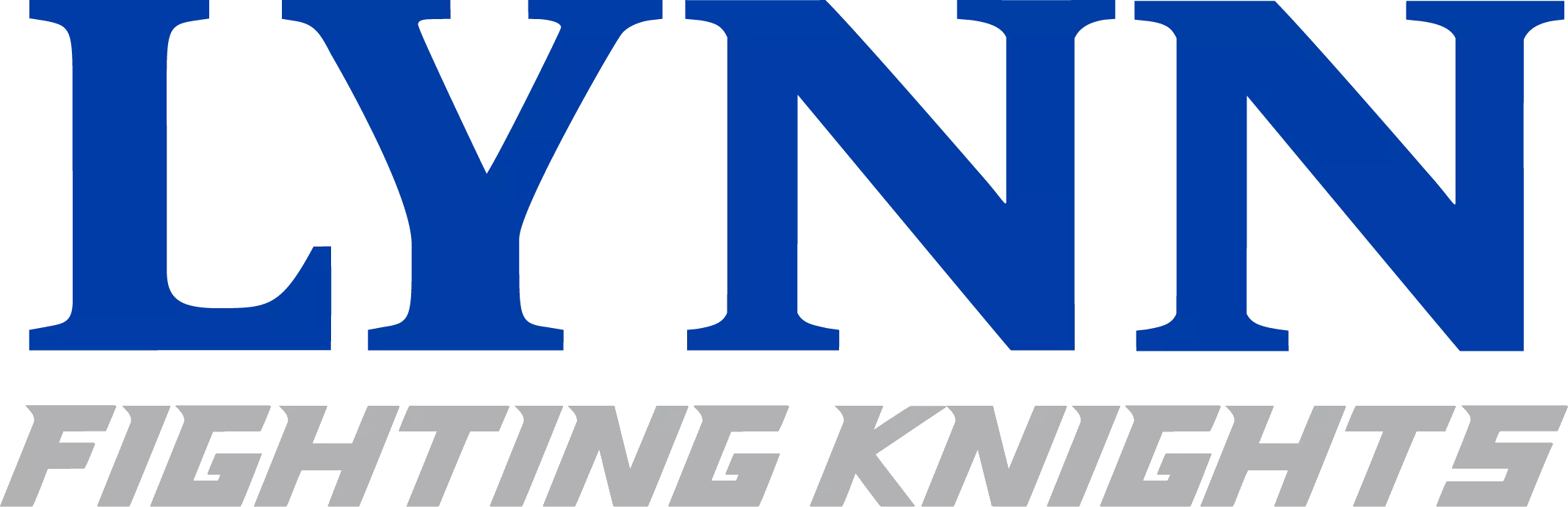

Team NCAA championships
- 15

The Lynn Fighting Knights are the athletic teams that represent Lynn University, located in Boca Raton, Florida, in NCAA Division II intercollegiate sports. The Fighting Knights compete as members of the Sunshine State Conference for all 14 varsity sports. Lynn has been a member of the SSC since 1997.

== Varsity teams ==
Lynn University added men's lacrosse for the 2014 season. The sport was the third addition in recent years, after the university added women's cross country and swimming in 2012.

Men's sports	Women's sports
Baseball	Basketball
Basketball	Cross country
Cross country	Golf
Golf	Lacrosse
Lacrosse	Soccer
Soccer	Softball
Swimming	Tennis
Tennis	Track and field
Track and field	Volleyball

== National championships ==
Lynn University teams have won a total of 24 NCAA and NAIA national championships, and 30 Sunshine State Conference championships.

=== Team ===
Sport	Association	Division	Year	Opponent/Runner-up	Score/Points
Baseball (1)	NCAA	Division II	2009	Emporia State	2–1
Men's golf (2)	NCAA	Division II	2018	West Florida	3–2
Men's golf (2)	NCAA	Division II	2019	Lincoln Memorial	3–2
Women's golf (3)	NCAA	Division II	1997	Methodist	1,292–1,318
Women's golf (3)	NCAA	Division II	2013	Nova Southeastern	1,187–1,190
Women's golf (3)	NCAA	Division II	2014	Barry	1,164–1,193
Men's soccer (6)	NAIA (2)	Single	1987	Simon Fraser	1–0 (aet)
Men's soccer (6)	NAIA (2)	Single	1991	Midwestern State	2–1 (aet)
Men's soccer (6)	NCAA (4)	Division II	2003	Cal State Chico	2–1
Men's soccer (6)	NCAA (4)	Division II	2012	Saginaw Valley State	3–2
Men's soccer (6)	NCAA (4)	Division II	2014	Charleston (WV)	3–2
Men's soccer (6)	NCAA (4)	Division II	2024	Charleston (WV)	3–2
Women's soccer (4)	NAIA (3)	Single	1992	Pacific Lutheran	1–0
Women's soccer (4)	NAIA (3)	Single	1994	Park (MO)	3–1
Women's soccer (4)	NAIA (3)	Single	1995	Lindenwood	4–1
Women's soccer (4)	NCAA (1)	Division II	1998	Sonoma State	3–1
Men's tennis (1)	NCAA	Division II	2007	Valdosta State	5–1
Women's tennis (6)	NAIA (3)	Single	1993	Auburn Montgomery	36–34
Women's tennis (6)	NAIA (3)	Single	1995	Mobile	34–32
Women's tennis (6)	NAIA (3)	Single	1996	Mobile	35–31
Women's tennis (6)	NCAA (3)	Division II	1997	Armstong Atlantic State	5–4
Women's tennis (6)	NCAA (3)	Division II	1998	Armstong Atlantic State	5–2
Women's tennis (6)	NCAA (3)	Division II	2001	BYU–Hawaii	5–3
Women's volleyball (1)	NCAA	Division II	2024	San Francisco State	3–2

== Notable athletes ==
- Jean Alexandre – Midfielder, San Jose Earthquakes
- Tal Erel – Baseball catcher for the Israel national baseball team
- Scott Gordon – Defender, Fort Lauderdale Strikers
- Svetlana Gounkina – Russian golfer; multiple Russian national champion; bronze medalist in the World Golfers Championship
- Tommy Kahnle – Pitcher for the Detroit Tigers.
- Tim Melia – Goalkeeper, Sporting Kansas City
- Jared Montz – Former Defender, Chicago Fire, and founder of Online Soccer Academy
- Melissa Ortiz – Former player for Colombia's Women's National Soccer Team

== NCAA sanctions ==
On July 17, 2007, NCAA vacated Lynn's 2005 Women's Division II Softball Championship due to extra benefits given to two players. The NCAA found that former coach Thomas Macera gave two Lynn softball players cash payments totaling more than $3,000. Lynn was also placed on probation for two years.
