= Southern Connecticut Owls =

College sports team

- University: Southern Connecticut State University
- Nickname: Owls
- NCAA: Division II
- Conference: Northeast-10 Conference; Eastern College Athletic Conference
- Athletic director: Terrance Jones
- Location: New Haven, Connecticut
- Varsity teams: 17 (7 men's, 10 women's)
- Football stadium: Jess Dow Field
- Basketball arena: Moore Field House
- Baseball stadium: The Ballpark at SCSU
- Aquatics center: Hutchinson Natatorium
- Other venues: Pelz Gymnasium
- Colors: Blue and white
- Mascot: Otus
- Website: scsuowls.com
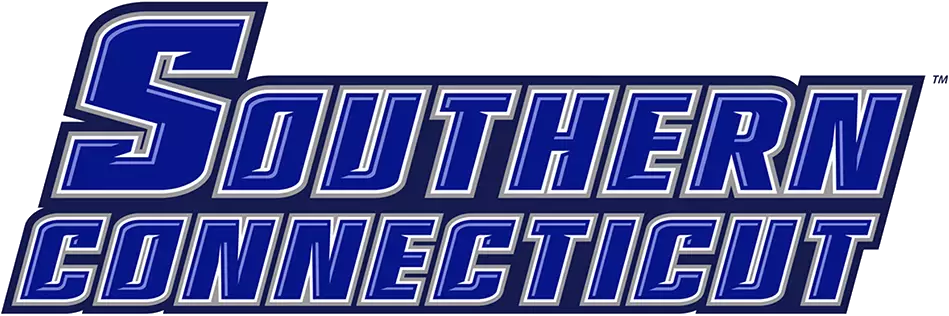

Team NCAA championships
- 10

The Southern Connecticut Owls (also Southern Connecticut State Owls, Southern Connecticut State University Owls, and SCSU Owls) are the athletic teams that represent Southern Connecticut State University, located in New Haven, Connecticut, in NCAA Division II intercollegiate sports. The Owls' 17 athletic teams, seven for men and 10 for women, compete as members of either the Northeast-10 Conference or the Eastern College Athletic Conference. SCSU has been a member of the NE-10 since 2000.

There have been 10 NCAA National Championship Teams at Southern, as well as 80 NCAA Individual Champions in the sports of Track and Field, Swimming and Gymnastics.

== Sports sponsored ==
Men's sports	Women's sports
Baseball	Basketball
Basketball	Cross country
Cross country	Field hockey
Football	Gymnastics
Soccer	Lacrosse
Swimming	Soccer
Track and field^{1}	Softball
	Swimming
	Track and field^{1}
	Volleyball
^{1} – includes both indoor and outdoor

=== Basketball ===
On March 24, 2007, the women's basketball team won the NCAA Division II championships. In a 61–45 victory, SCSU beat the previously undefeated Florida Gulf Coast.

=== Gymnastics ===
The street circle in front of the Moore Fieldhouse is named in honor of former Olympian Abie Grossfeld, former head gymnastics coach at the university.

=== Soccer ===
SCSU's men's soccer team won titles in 1987, 1990, 1992, 1995, 1998, and 1999. The six titles are the most for any Division II men's soccer team in the country. The program has appeared in 32 NCAA Division II Tournaments, 17 NCAA Final Four appearances, and has produced 52 All-Americans, 15 Senior Bowl Players, 4 National Player of the Year Award Winners, and 1 Golden Boot Award (Top Goalkeeper in any NCAA Division) winner.

=== Swimming ===
The swimming and diving team scored their highest at the NCAA championship meet in March for the years 2007 and 2008.

=== Football ===
SCSU's football program has produced coaches and players who went on to the National Football League.

==== Alumni in the NFL ====
Active coaches

- Jeff Stoutland, linebackers coach (1984-1985), offensive coordinator (1988-1992)
- Tim Holt, tight ends coach & assistant offensive line coach (1995-1996), running backs coach (2005-2007)
- Roy Istavan, NFL OL Assistant Coach, Former SCSU OL
- Jacques Cesaire, Defensive line coach and former defensive lineman

Former coaches

- Kevin Gilbride, quarterback and tight end, head coach (1980-1984)
- Chris Palmer, quarterback (1969-1971)
- Nick Nicolau, running back (1957-1959), assistant coach (1960)

Former players

- Scott Mersereau, defensive tackle for the New York Jets (1987-1993)
- Joe Andruzzi, guard (1998-2006)
- Travis Tucker, TE for Cleveland Browns (1984-1986)
- Jacques Cesaire, defensive line coach and former defensive lineman
- Jerome Cunningham, TE NY Giants, Tennessee Titans (2015-2019)
- Nick DeFelice, (1965)
- Following Former SCSU Players were high level UDFA's but did not make rosters out of Training Camps, but were signed for 1987 Replacement games and credited 1 year of NFL service.
- Ricky Atkinson, CB New England Patriots (1987)
- Pat Morrison, S New York Giants (1987)
- Mark Carlson, OL Washington Redskins (1987)
- Following Former SCSU Players were signed for 1987 Replacement games and credited 1 year for NFL service.
- Anthony Corvino, OL New York Jets (1987)
- Dave Hendley, S New England Patriots (1987)
- Jamie Kurisko, TE New York Jets (1987)

=== Volleyball ===
SCSU's volleyball program had its most successful seasons in 2017–18 and in 2018–19. The Owls had their first National Tournament berth in 2017 with a record of 24–11. They ended their campaign in the second round of the National Tournament when they lost to New Haven. In 2018, the Owls won their first-ever NE-10 Conference Title against American International. The Owls then had their second berth into the National Tournament, but lost in the first round.

== Facilities ==
Venue	Sport(s)	Ref.
Jess Dow Field	Football; Soccer; Lacrosse; Field hockey Track and field (outdoor)	
The Ballpark at SCSU	Baseball	
Pelz Field	Softball	
James Moore Field House	Basketball; Track and field (indoor)	
Hutchinson Natatorium	Swimming	
Pelz Gymnasium	Gymastics; Volleyball; Recreation activities	

== National championships ==
The Owls have won ten NCAA team national championships.

=== Team ===
Association	Division	Sport	Year	Opponent/Runner-up	Score
NCAA (10)	Division II (10)				
NCAA (10)	Division II (10)	Women's Basketball (1)	2007	Florida Gulf Coast	61–45
NCAA (10)	Division II (10)	Men's Gymnastics (3)	1973	Cal State Northridge	160.75–158.70
NCAA (10)	Division II (10)	Men's Gymnastics (3)	1975	Illinois–Chicago	411.65–398.80
NCAA (10)	Division II (10)	Men's Gymnastics (3)	1976	Illinois–Chicago	419.20–388.85
NCAA (10)	Division II (10)	Men's Soccer (6)	1987	Cal State Northridge	2–0
NCAA (10)	Division II (10)	Men's Soccer (6)	1990	Seattle Pacific	0–0 (4OT, PK)
NCAA (10)	Division II (10)	Men's Soccer (6)	1992	Tampa	1–0
NCAA (10)	Division II (10)	Men's Soccer (6)	1995	USC Spartanburg	2–0
NCAA (10)	Division II (10)	Men's Soccer (6)	1998	USC Spartanburg	1–0
NCAA (10)	Division II (10)	Men's Soccer (6)	1999	Fort Lewis	2–1 (2OT)
