= Seattle Pacific Falcons =

Athletic teams at Seattle Pacific University

- University: Seattle Pacific University
- Nickname: Falcons
- NCAA: Division II
- Conference: Great Northwest Athletic Conference
- Athletic director: Dan Lepse
- Location: Seattle, Washington
- Varsity teams: 11
- Basketball arena: Royal Brougham Pavilion
- Soccer stadium: Interbay Stadium
- Colors: Maroon and white
- Mascot: Talon the Falcon
- Website: spufalcons.com
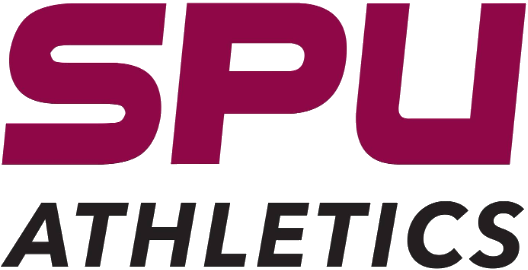

The Seattle Pacific Falcons (also SPU Falcons) are the 11 varsity athletic teams that represent Seattle Pacific University, located in Seattle, Washington, in NCAA Division II intercollegiate sports. The Falcons compete as members of the Great Northwest Athletic Conference for all sports.

== Teams ==
Men's sports	Women's sports
Basketball	Basketball
Cross country	Cross country
Soccer	Golf
Track and field	Rowing
	Soccer
	Track and field
	Volleyball

== History ==
=== National championships ===
Association	Division	Sport	Year	Opponent	Score
Men's soccer	NCAA	Division II	1978	Alabama A&M	1–0 (3OT)
Men's soccer	NCAA	Division II	1983	Tampa	1–0
Men's soccer	NCAA	Division II	1985	Florida International	3–2
Men's soccer	NCAA	Division II	1986	Oakland	4–1
Men's soccer	NCAA	Division II	1993	Southern Connecticut	1–0
Women's soccer	NCAA	Division II	2008	West Florida	1–0 (2OT)
Women's rowing	NCAA	Division II	2024 V4+ National Champion, 2026 V8+ National Runner-Up	SPU Women's Rowing notably made several NCAA appearances, earning team 2nd place in 2010, team 3rd place in 2023 and 2026, team 4th place in 2025, V4+ National Champion in 2024 and V8+ National Silver Medal in 2026	

Vanessa Aniteye Placed 1st in the NCAA indoor Track meet running the 800m
