= NCAA Division III men's soccer tournament =

Annual tournament in the United States

- NCAA logo
- Association: NCAA
- Sport: Men's college soccer
- Founded: 1974; 52 years ago
- Division: Division III
- No. of teams: 64
- Country: United States
- Most recent champion: Tufts (5th)
- Most titles: Messiah (11)
- Website: ncaa.com/soccer

The NCAA Division III men's soccer tournament is an annual event organized by the National Collegiate Athletic Association (NCAA) to determine the national champions of men's collegiate soccer among its Division III members in the United States. It has been held every year since 1974.

Messiah have been the most successful program, with 11 titles.

Tufts are the reigning champions, winning their fifth championship in 2025.

== History ==
It has been held each year since 1974, except 2020, when the Division III championship was established for universities that do not award athletics scholarships. The 2020 tournament was cancelled due to the COVID-19 pandemic. Division III teams had previously competed as part of the NCAA College Division Men's Soccer Championship (now Division II). A total of 64 teams participate, making it the largest of the NCAA's men's soccer tournaments.

Traditionally, the tournament is held in November and December at the end of the regular season. The tournament finals were initially held on the campus of one of the teams participating in the semifinals. Since 2004, however, they have been held at the same pre-determined neutral site as the NCAA Division III Women's Soccer Championship (added in 1986).

== Selection format ==
Of the three NCAA divisions, Division III has the most complicated selection process. In 2012, the tournament was a 62-team, single-elimination tournament. Teams are divided into three pools. Pool A consists of the 36 conference champions, who all receive automatic bids to the tournament. Pool B consists of all teams which are not in conferences or which are in conferences that do not meet the requirements to be awarded an automatic bid. Four teams are selected from Pool B. Pool C consists of all the other teams, plus those Pool B teams not already selected. The remaining teams in the field are selected from Pool C. Two teams received first round byes, and the rest of the bracket was filled by geographical proximity. The early rounds of the championship were played at campus sites with the higher seeded team hosting the match. The semifinals and finals are played at a predetermined campus site. The 2012 Division III final rounds were held at Blossom Soccer Complex in San Antonio.

== Results ==
Keys

- (a.e.t.) – match went to extra time
- (p) – match result defined on penalties

Ed.	Year	Host city	Championship			Semifinalists		
Ed.	Year	Host city	Champion	Score	Runner-Up	Third Place	Score	Fourth Place
1	1974	Wheaton, IL	Brockport State (1)	3–1	Swarthmore	Westfield State	3–1	MacMurray
2	1975	Brockport, NY	Babson (1)	1–0	Brockport	OWU	1–0	Johns Hopkins
3	1976	Elizabethtown, PA	Brandeis (1)	2–1 (a.e.t.)	Brockport	Elizabethtown	2–1	MacMurray
4	1977	Wellesley, MA	Lock Haven (1)	1–0	Cortland	Babson	1–0	Wooster
5	1978	Wellesley, MA	Lock Haven (2)	3–0	Washington (SL)	Cortland	2–1 (a.e.t.)	North Adams
6	1979	Trenton, NJ	Babson (2)	2–1	Rowan	Washington (SL)	2–1	Lock Haven
7	1980	Wellesley, MA	Babson (3)	1–0 (a.e.t.)	Scranton	Rowan	1–0	Washington (SL)
8	1981	Elizabethtown, PA	Rowan (1)	2–1 (a.e.t.)	Scranton	Brandeis	4–2	OWU
9	1982	Greensboro, NC	UNCG (1)	2–1	Bethany (WV)	Cortland and Scranton		
10	1983	Greensboro, NC	UNCG (2)	3–2	Claremont	Plymouth State and Scranton		
11	1984	Wheaton, IL	Wheaton (IL) (1)	2–1 (a.e.t.)	Brandeis	Kean and RIT		
12	1985	St. Louis, MO	UNCG (3)	5–2	Washington (SL)	Fredonia and Rowan		
13	1986	Greensboro, NC	UNCG (4)	2–0	UC San Diego	Fredonia and Messiah		
14	1987	Greensboro, NC	UNCG (5)	6–1	Washington (SL)	Cal State (SB) and Salem State		
15	1988	Rochester, NY	UC San Diego	3–0	RIT	Messiah and Salem State		
16	1989	Elizabethtown, PA	Elizabethtown (1)	2–0	Greensboro	UC San Diego and RIT		
17	1990	Delaware, OH	Rowan (1)	1–1 (? p)	OWU	Salem State and Wheaton (IL)		
18	1991	San Diego, CA	UC San Diego (2)	1–0	TCNJ	Babson and OWU		
19	1992	Union, NJ	Kean (1)	3–1	OWU	Colorado and RIT		
20	1993	Williamstown, MA	UC San Diego (3)	1–0	Williams	Clarkson and Kenyon		
21	1994	Trenton, NJ	Bethany (WV)	1–0 (a.e.t.)	Johns Hopkins	Trenton State & Wisconsin–Oshkosh		
22	1995	Williamstown, MA	Williams (1)	2–1	Methodist	Chapman and Muhlenberg		
23	1996	Gambier, OH	TCNJ (1)	2–1 (a.e.t.)	Kenyon	Chicago and Ithaca		
24	1997	Fredericksburg, VA	Wheaton (IL) (2)	3–0	TCNJ	Amherst and Mary Washington		
25	1998	Delaware, OH	OWU (1)	2–1 (a.e.t.)	Greensboro	Rowan and Williams		
26	1999	Wheaton, IL	St. Lawrence (1)	2–0	Wheaton (IL)	Alma and Stockton		
27	2000	Glassboro, NJ	Messiah (1)	2–0	Rowan	Linfield and Wisconsin–Oshkosh		
28	2001	Grantham, PA	Stockton (1)	3–2	Redlands	Messiah and OWU		
29	2002	Canton, NY	Messiah (2)	1–0	Otterbein	St. Lawrence and Trinity (TX)		
30	2003	Madison, NJ	Trinity (TX) (1)	2–1	Drew	Wheaton (MA) and Wisconsin–Oshkosh		
31	2004	Greensboro, NC	Messiah (3)	4–0	UC Santa Cruz	Geneseo State and Salisbury		
32	2005	Greensboro, NC	Messiah (4)	1–0	Gustavus Adolphus	Plattsburgh State and Wheaton (IL)		
33	2006	Lake Buena Vista, FL	Messiah (5)	3–0	Wheaton (IL)	NYU and OWU		
34	2007	Lake Buena Vista, FL	Middlebury	0–0 (4–3 p)	Trinity (TX)	Loras and Messiah		
35	2008	Greensboro, NC	Messiah (6)	1–1 (3–0 p)	Stevens	Amherst and Loras		
36	2009	San Antonio, TX	Messiah (7)	2–0	Calvin	Dominican (IL) and Williams		
37	2010	San Antonio, TX	Messiah (8)	2–1 (a.e.t.)	Lynchburg	Bowdoin and Wisconsin–Oshkosh		
38	2011	San Antonio, TX	OWU (2)	2–1	Calvin	Montclair State and Oneonta State		
39	2012	San Antonio, TX	Messiah (9)	5–1	Ohio Northern	Loras and Williams		
40	2013	San Antonio, TX	Messiah (10)	2–1 (a.e.t.)	Rutgers–Camden	Loras and Williams		
41	2014	Kansas City, MO	Tufts	4–2	Wheaton (IL)	OWU and SUNY Oneonta		
42	2015	Kansas City, MO	Amherst (1)	2–1	Loras	Calvin and SUNY Oneonta		
43	2016	Salem, VA	Tufts (2)	1–0 (a.e.t.)	Calvin	Brandeis and St. Thomas (MN)		
44	2017	Greensboro, NC	Messiah (11)	2–1	North Park	Brandeis and Chicago		
45	2018	Greensboro, NC	Tufts (3)	2–1	Calvin	Chicago and Rochester (NY)		
46	2019	Greensboro, NC	Tufts (4)	2–0	Amherst	Calvin and Centre		
–	2020	–	(Canceled due to the COVID-19 pandemic)			–		
47	2021	Greensboro, NC	Connecticut College (1)	1–1 (4–1 p)	Amherst	Chicago and Washington & Lee		
48	2022	Salem, VA	Chicago (1)	2–0	Williams	Stevens and Mary Washington		
49	2023	Salem, VA	St. Olaf (1)	2–0	Amherst	Washington and Lee and Washington (MD)		
50	2024	Las Vegas, NV	Amherst (2)	0-0 (4–3 p)	Connecticut College	Middlebury and Washington & Lee		
51	2025	Salem, VA	Tufts (5)	2–1 (a.e.t.)	Trinity (TX)	St. Olaf and Emory		
52	2026	Columbus, OH						
53	2027	Pittsburgh, PA						

== Champions ==
NCAA Division III national championships, by school: 13, 5, 3, 2, 1

Team	Titles	Winning years
Messiah	11	2000, 2002, 2004, 2005, 2006, 2008, 2009, 2010, 2012, 2013, 2017
Tufts	5	2014, 2016, 2018, 2019, 2025
Babson	3	1975, 1979, 1980
Amherst	2	2015, 2024
Ohio Wesleyan	2	1998, 2011
Rowan	2	1981, 1990
Wheaton (IL)	2	1984, 1997
St. Olaf	1	2023
Chicago	1	2022
Connecticut College	1	2021
Middlebury	1	2007
Trinity (TX)	1	2003
Stockton (Richard Stockton)	1	2001
St. Lawrence	1	1999
TCNJ (Trenton State)	1	1996
Williams	1	1995
Bethany (WV)	1	1994
Kean	1	1992
Elizabethtown	1	1989
Brandeis	1	1976
Brockport	1	1974

=== Former programs ===
Team	Titles	Winning years
UNC Greensboro	5	1982, 1983, 1985, 1986, 1987
UC San Diego	3	1988, 1991, 1993
Lock Haven	2	1977, 1978

- All of the above schools have reclassified their athletic programs from NCAA Division III. UC San Diego and UNC Greensboro are now Division I, and Lock Haven is Division II.

== See also ==
- NCAA Men's Soccer Championships (Division I, Division II)
- NCAA Women's Soccer Championships (Division I, Division II, Division III)
- NAIA national men's soccer championship
- Intercollegiate Soccer Football Association
