= 1981 NAIA soccer championship =

1981 NAIA Soccer Championship

Tournament details
- Country: United States; Canada
- Venue: Springfield, Illinois
- Teams: 12

Final positions
- Champions: Quincy (IL) (11th title)
- Runners-up: Alderson Broaddus
- Third place: Keene State
- Fourth place: Alabama–Huntsville

Tournament statistics
- Matches played: 16
- Goals scored: 67 (4.19 per match)

Awards
- Best player: Kyle Dietrich, Keene State

The 1981 NAIA Soccer Championship was the 23rd annual tournament held by the NAIA to determine the national champion of men's college soccer among its members in the United States and Canada.

Four-time defending champions Quincy (IL) defeated Alderson Broaddus in the final, 4–1, to claim the Hawks' record eleventh NAIA national title.

The final was again played at Sangamon State University in Springfield, Illinois.

== Qualification ==
The tournament field expanded for the second time in three years, increasing from ten to twelve teams.

There was a significant change in tournament format this season. The previous single-elimination tournament, with additional consolation bracket, was dropped in favor of a two-round system consisting of an initial round of pool play, with twelve teams sorted into three groups for round-robin play, followed by a four-team single-elimination tournament, with additional third-place final, of the four teams that won each of the initial groups. The total number of matches, however, increased only from fifteen to sixteen.

Qualified Teams
School	Appearance	Last Bid
Alabama–Huntsville	5th	1980
Alderson Broaddus	3rd	1979
Berry (GA)	1st	Never
Biola	1st	Never
Indiana Tech	1st	Never
Keene State	7th	1980
Midwestern State	2nd	1977
Quincy (IL)	15th	1980
Rockhurst	10th	1980
Rutgers–Camden	2nd	1977
Sangamon State	3rd	1980
Simon Fraser	7th	1980

== First round ==
=== Pool A ===
	Pool A	QC	SSU	MSU
1	Quincy (IL) (2–0–0)		4–1	3–0
2	Sangamon State (0–1–1)	—		2–2
3	Midwestern State (0–1–1)	—	—	

=== Pool B ===
	Pool B	UAH	BU	IIT
1	Alabama–Huntsville (2–0–0)		5–2	3–0
2	Biola (0–1–1)	—		4–4
3	Indiana Tech (0–1–1)	—	—	

=== Pool C ===
	Pool C	KSC	RC	RUC
1	Keene State (1–0–1)		1–1	5–2
2	Rockhurst (1–0–1)	—		3–0
3	Rutgers–Camden (0–2–0)	—	—	

=== Pool D ===
	Pool D	ABC	SFU	BC
1	Alderson Broaddus (1–0–1)		1–1	5–0
2	Simon Fraser (1–0–1)	—		4–1
3	Berry (0–2–0)	—	—	

== Knock out round ==
=== Bracket ===
Semifinals
A1	Quincy (IL)	2
B1	Alabama–Huntsville	0
C1	Keene State	1
D1	Alderson Broaddus	2***

National championship
A1	Quincy (IL)	4
D1	Alderson Broaddus	1
Third place final
B1	Alabama–Huntsville	0
C1	Keene State	3

== See also ==
- 1981 NCAA Division I soccer tournament
- 1981 NCAA Division II soccer tournament
