= 1998 NCAA Division II men's soccer tournament =

1998 NCAA Division II Men's Soccer Championship
Tournament details
- Country: United States
- Teams: 16

Final positions
- Champions: Southern Connecticut (5th title, 7th final)
- Runners-up: USC Spartanburg (2nd final)

Tournament statistics
- Matches played: 15
- Goals scored: 52 (3.47 per match)
- Attendance: 8,925 (595 per match)
- Top goal scorer(s): Vadim Tolstolutsky, Seattle Pacific (2); Dan Valency, Southern Connecticut (3)
- All statistics correct as of 11/9/2019.

The 1998 NCAA Division II Men's Soccer Championship was the 27th annual tournament held by the NCAA to determine the top men's Division II college soccer program in the United States.

Southern Connecticut State (20-2-1) defeated South Carolina–Spartanburg, 1–0, in the tournament final. This was the fifth national title for the Owls, who were coached by Tom Lang. This was also a rematch of the championship final from 1995, also won by SCSU.

== Bracket ==
First Round; *Campus sites
*	Lynn	3
Barry	0
West Florida	1
*	USC Spartanburg	3
*	Truman State	3(OT)
Quincy	2
*	Mercyhurst	1
East Stroudsburg	0
*	Southern Conn.	4
Dowling	0
Franklin Pierce	1
*	N.H. College	4
*	Seattle Pacific	4
Fort Lewis	3
Cal Poly Pomona	1
*	Grand Canyon	3

Quarterfinals; *Campus sites
*	Lynn	1
USC Spartanburg	2(2OT)
*	Truman State	0
Mercyhurst	1
*	Southern Conn.	4
N.H. College	2
*	Seattle Pacific	2(3OT)
Grand Canyon	1

Semifinals; *Campus sites
*	USC Spartanburg	2
Mercyhurst	0
Southern Conn.	3
Seattle Pacific	0

Final; December 5 Spartanburg, SC
*	USC Spartanburg	0
Southern Conn.	1

== Final ==
December 5, 1998
13:00 EST (UTC−5)

USC Spartanburg	0–1	Southern Connecticut State
	Report	Assaf Degai 7:58' (Oyuga)

Spartanburg, SC
Attendance: 2,833

== See also ==
- NCAA Division I Men's Soccer Championship
- NCAA Division III Men's Soccer Championship
- NAIA Men's Soccer Championship
