= 1979 NAIA soccer championship =

1979 NAIA Soccer Championship

Tournament details
- Country: United States; Canada
- Venue: Springfield, Illinois
- Teams: 10

Final positions
- Champions: Quincy (IL) (9th title)
- Runners-up: Rockhurst
- Third place: Simon Fraser
- Fourth place: Southern Maine

Tournament statistics
- Matches played: 15
- Goals scored: 56 (3.73 per match)

Awards
- Best player: Craig Stahl, Rockhurst

The 1979 NAIA Soccer Championship was the 21st annual tournament held by the NAIA to determine the national champion of men's college soccer among its members in the United States and Canada.

Two-time defending champions Quincy (IL) defeated Rockhurst in the final, 1–0, to claim the Hawks' ninth NAIA national title.

The final was played at Sangamon State University in Springfield, Illinois.

== Qualification ==
The tournament field expended for the first time since 1968, increasing from eight to ten teams. Third- and fifth- placed finals remained in place, while the seventh-placed final was removed.

Qualified Teams
School	Appearance	Last Bid
Alabama–Huntsville	3rd	1978
Alderson Broaddus	2nd	1967
Indiana (PA)	1st	Never
Quincy (IL)	13th	1978
Roberts Wesleyan	2nd	1967
Rockhurst	8th	1978
Sangamon State	1st	Never
Simon Fraser	5th	1978
Southern Maine	2nd	1976
Spring Arbor	3rd	1976

== Brackets ==
=== Championship ===
Preliminary round
Alderson Broaddus	3
Roberts Wesleyan	1
Sangamon State	2
Indiana (PA)	0

Quarterfinals
Quincy (IL)	1
Alderson Broaddus	0
Southern Maine	3
Spring Arbor	2
Rockhurst	3
Sangamon State	1
Simon Fraser	3
Alabama–Huntsville	2

Semifinals
Quincy (IL)	4
Southern Maine	1
Rockhurst	3*
Simon Fraser	2

Final
Quincy (IL)	1
Rockhurst	0
Third Place Final
Southern Maine	0
Simon Fraser	5

=== Consolation ===
Consolation first round
Sangamon State	1
Roberts Wesleyan	0
Indiana (PA)	4
Alderson Broaddus	2

Consolation semifinals
Spring Arbor	2
Sangamon State	1
Alabama–Huntsville	1
Indiana (PA)	3

Consolation final
Spring Arbor	3
Indiana (PA)	2

== See also ==
- 1979 NCAA Division I soccer tournament
- 1979 NCAA Division II soccer tournament
