= 1980 NAIA soccer championship =

1980 NAIA Soccer Championship

Tournament details
- Country: United States; Canada
- Venue: Springfield, Illinois
- Teams: 10

Final positions
- Champions: Quincy (IL) (10th title)
- Runners-up: Simon Fraser
- Third place: Davis & Elkins
- Fourth place: Alabama–Huntsville

Tournament statistics
- Matches played: 13
- Goals scored: 56 (4.31 per match)

Awards
- Best player: Mike Gallo, Quincy (IL)

The 1980 NAIA Soccer Championship was the 22nd annual tournament held by the NAIA to determine the national champion of men's college soccer among its members in the United States and Canada.

Three-time defending champions Quincy (IL) defeated Simon Fraser in the final, 1–0, to claim the Hawks' tenth NAIA national title.

The final was again played at Sangamon State University in Springfield, Illinois.

== Qualification ==
The tournament field remained fixed at ten teams. Two consolation games were eliminated, however, reducing the number of games from fifteen to thirteen.

Qualified Teams
School	Appearance	Last Bid
Alabama–Huntsville	4th	1979
Davis & Elkins	11th	1978
Dowling	1st	Never
Keene State	6th	1978
Quincy (IL)	14th	1979
Rockhurst	9th	1979
Sangamon State	2nd	1979
Simon Fraser	6th	1979
Southern Maine	3rd	1979
Wilmington (OH)	1st	Never

== Brackets ==
=== Championship ===
Preliminary round
Sangamon State	2
Dowling	0
Wilmington (OH)	5
Southern Maine	2

Quarterfinals
Davis & Elkins	4****
Sangamon State	3
Simon Fraser	2
Keene State	0
Alabama–Huntsville	8
Wilmington (OH)	1
Quincy (IL)	1
Rockhurst	0

Semifinals
Davis & Elkins	0
Simon Fraser	5
Alabama–Huntsville	0
Quincy (IL)	4

Final
Simon Fraser	0
Quincy (IL)	1
Third Place Final
Davis & Elkins	3
Alabama–Huntsville	2

=== Consolation ===
Consolation semifinals
Dowling	3
Keene State	4
Southern Maine	0
Rockhurst	1*

Consolation final
Keene State	1
Rockhurst	4

== See also ==
- 1980 NCAA Division I soccer tournament
- 1980 NCAA Division II soccer tournament
