= Bob Butehorn =

Retired American soccer coach (born 1960)

Biographical details
- Born: August 12, 1960 (age 66); Baltimore, Maryland
- Education: Tampa (B.S.); UPenn (M.S.)

Playing career
- 1980–1983: Tampa Spartans
- Position: Midfielder

Coaching career (HC unless noted)
- 1988–1994: Maryland Terrapins (assistant)
- 1995–1998: St. Bonaventure Bonnies
- 2001–2006: Penn Quakers (assistant)
- 2007–2016: Florida Gulf Coast Eagles
- 2017–2025: South Florida Bulls

Head coaching record
- Overall: 192–143–50
- Tournaments: 1–4 (NCAA Division I)

Accomplishments and honors

Championships
- NCAA Division II National Champion (1981, Tampa Spartans); 6 ASUN Regular Season; 4 ASUN Tournament

Awards
- 3× ASUN Coach of the Year; NSCAA South Region Coach of the Year (2012)

Records
- Most wins in FGCU program history 6 straight ASUN regular season titles (2010–2015)

Robert "Bob" Butehorn (born August 12, 1960) is a retired American soccer coach. He served as head coach of the South Florida Bulls men's soccer program from 2017 to 2025. Butehorn previously built the Florida Gulf Coast Eagles men's soccer program from its inception in 2007, leading the Eagles to six straight Atlantic Sun regular season titles, four conference tournament titles, and four NCAA Tournament appearances. He also had earlier head coaching experience at St. Bonaventure and played on the University of Tampa's 1981 NCAA Division II national championship team.

== Early life ==
Bob Butehorn was born on August 12, 1960, in Baltimore, Maryland. He grew up in the Washington, D.C. metropolitan area, specifically in Glenelg, Maryland.

== College career ==
Butehorn attended the University of Tampa, where he was part of the team's 1981 NCAA Division II Soccer Championship run. He played as a midfielder.

At Tampa, Butehorn earned a Bachelor's degree in sports science. He later earned his Master of Science in Sports Science at the University of Pennsylvania.

== Coaching career ==
=== Maryland Tarpins (assistant) ===
Butehorn's coaching career began as an assistant to the Maryland Terrapins men's soccer program from 1988 to 1994.

=== St. Bonaventure Bonnies ===
He became the head coach for the St. Bonaventure Bonnies men's soccer program in 1995, serving until 1998. In 1997, he had the program's winningest season at the time, posting a 12–6–0 record. At St. Bonaventure, Butehorn coached the only Atlantic 10 Conference Player of the Year in school history.

Butehorn's final record at St. Bonaventure was 34–32–4.

=== Penn Quakers (assistant) ===
Upon leaving St. Bonaventure, Butehorn served as an assistant coach for the Penn Quakers men's soccer program before becoming the first head coach of the Florida Gulf Coast Eagles men's soccer program in 2007.

=== Florida Gulf Coast Eagles ===
Butehorn was the inaugural head coach of the Florida Gulf Coast Eagles men's soccer program, starting in 2007. He built the program from scratch and made it competitive in the Atlantic Sun Conference (ASUN).

FGCU achieved significant success in the Atlantic Sun Conference (ASUN). He guided the Eagles to six consecutive ASUN regular season titles (2010–2015) and four ASUN tournament championships (2011, 2012, 2014, 2016). He had 9–0–0 conference record in 2010. The team made four NCAA Division I Tournament appearances (2011, 2012, 2014, 2016), reaching the second round in 2016.

Butehorn was named ASUN Coach of the Year three times (2009, 2011, 2015) and NSCAA South Region Coach of the Year in 2012. During his tenure, the Eagles reached as high as No. 11 in the national rankings in 2016 and earned multiple Top 25 rankings. He coached numerous award winners, including ASUN Players of the Year in 2015 and 2016, and developed a strong pipeline of All-Conference and All-Academic honorees.

His overall record at Florida Gulf Coast was 93–63–24.

=== South Florida Bulls ===
On December 18, 2016, Butehorn was hired as the head coach for the South Florida Bulls men's soccer program. The Bulls reached the NCAA tournament in 2019 and 2022 under his leadership.

He developed seven players selected in the MLS SuperDraft and coached 25 All-American Athletic Conference honorees, including American Conference Player of the Year winners Jahiem Wickham (Goalkeeper of the Year, 2025), Pedro Faife (Midfielder of the Year, 2024), and Kazuna Takase (Goalkeeper of the Year, 2021).

His overall record at South Florida was 64–59–23.

== Personal life ==
Butehorn retired following the 2025 season.

He is married to Cindy Butehorn, they have two daughters (Madison and Jessica).

He resides in the Tampa/Naples area.

== Honors ==
=== As a player ===
==== Tampa ====
- NCAA Division II National Champion: (1981)

=== As a coach ===
==== Florida Gulf Coast Eagles ====
- ASUN Regular Season Champion (6): 2010, 2011, 2012, 2013, 2014, 2015
- ASUN Tournament Champion (4): 2011, 2012, 2014, 2016
- ASUN Coach of the Year (3): 2009, 2011, 2015
- NSCAA South Region Coach of the Year (1): 2012

==== South Florida Bulls ====
- NCAA Division I Tournament Appearances (2): 2019, 2022

== Head coaching record ==
Record table
Season	Team	Overall	Conference	Standing	Postseason
St. Bonaventure Bonnies (Atlantic 10 Conference) (1995–1998)
1995	St. Bonaventure				
1996	St. Bonaventure				
1997	St. Bonaventure				
1998	St. Bonaventure				
Florida Gulf Coast Eagles (Atlantic Sun Conference) (2007–2016)
2007	Florida Gulf Coast	6–11–2	3–5–1	7th	Ineligible
2008	Florida Gulf Coast	6–10–2	3–5–1	7th	Ineligible
2009	Florida Gulf Coast	8–7–1	6–3–0	3rd	Ineligible
2010	Florida Gulf Coast	13–3–2	9–0–0	1st	Ineligible
2011	Florida Gulf Coast	12–6–2	7–1–0	1st	A-Sun Champions; NCAA First Round
2012	Florida Gulf Coast	11–5–3	6–1–1	1st	A-Sun Champions; NCAA First Round
2013	Florida Gulf Coast	8–7–2	6–1–1	1st	A-Sun Semifinal
2014	Florida Gulf Coast	8–7–5	4–1–1	T-1st	A-Sun Champions; NCAA First Round
2015	Florida Gulf Coast	7–4–3	4–0–1	T-1st	A-Sun Semifinal
2016	Florida Gulf Coast	14–3–2	4–1–1	2nd	A-Sun Champions; NCAA Second Round
Florida Gulf Coast:		93–63–24 (.583)	52–18–7 (.721)		
South Florida Bulls (American Athletic Conference) (2017–2025)
2017	South Florida	6–6–4	3–2–2	5th	
2018	South Florida	7–8–2	4–1–2	3rd	
2019	South Florida	11–7–1	4–3–0	3rd	NCAA First Round
2020	South Florida	4–6–0	4–6–0	5th	
2021	South Florida	6–7–2	4–5–1	5th	
2022	South Florida	9–6–4	5–1–3	3rd	NCAA Second Round
2023	South Florida	6–9–1	3–4–1	5th	
2024	South Florida	6–6–4	4–3–0	4th	
2025	South Florida	9–3–5	5–2–1	2nd	American Tournament First Round
South Florida:		64–59–23 (.517)	35–27–10 (.556)		
Total:		192–143–50 (.564)			
National champion Postseason invitational champion Conference regular season champion Conference regular season and conference tournament champion Division regular season champion Division regular season and conference tournament champion Conference tournament champion
