= 1978 NAIA soccer championship =

1978 NAIA Soccer Championship

Tournament details
- Country: United States; Canada
- Venue: Huntsville, Alabama
- Teams: 8

Final positions
- Champions: Quincy (IL) (8th title)
- Runners-up: Alabama–Huntsville
- Third place: Rockhurst
- Fourth place: Davis & Elkins

Tournament statistics
- Matches played: 12
- Goals scored: 42 (3.5 per match)

Awards
- Best player: Bob Radice, Quincy (IL)

The 1978 NAIA Soccer Championship was the 20th annual tournament held by the NAIA to determine the national champion of men's college soccer among its members in the United States and Canada.

Defending champions Quincy (IL) defeated Alabama–Huntsville in the final, 2–0, to claim the Hawks' eighth NAIA national title.

The final was played in Huntsville, Alabama.

== Qualification ==
The tournament field remained fixed at eight teams. Third-, fifth-, and seventh-placed finals remained in place alongside the national championship match.

Qualified Teams
School	Appearance	Last Bid
Alabama–Huntsville	2nd	1976
Davis & Elkins	10th	1977
Keene State	5th	1977
The King's (NY)	1st	Never
Quincy (IL)	12th	1977
Rockhurst	7th	1976
Simon Fraser	4th	1977
Tennessee Wesleyan	1st	Never

== Bracket ==
Fifth place
The King's	1
Simon Fraser	3
Seventh place
Keene State	4
Tennessee Wesleyan	0

Consolation semifinals
The King's	2
Keene State	1
Tennessee Wesleyan	3
Simon Fraser	5

First round
Davis & Elkins	3
The King's	1
Quincy (IL)	3
Keene State	1
Rockhurst	3
Tennessee Wesleyan	1
Alabama–Huntsville	2
Simon Fraser	1

Championship semifinals
Davis & Elkins	2
Quincy (IL)	3
4OT
Rockhurst	1
Alabama–Huntsville	2

Championship
Quincy (IL)	2
Alabama–Huntsville	0
Third place
Davis & Elkins	0
Rockhurst	1

== See also ==
- 1978 NCAA Division I soccer tournament
- 1978 NCAA Division II soccer tournament
