= 1964 NAIA soccer championship =

1964 NAIA Soccer Championship

Tournament details
- Country: United States
- Venue(s): Montclair State College; Upper Montclair, New Jersey
- Teams: 4

Final positions
- Champions: Trenton State (1st title)
- Runners-up: Lincoln (PA)

Tournament statistics
- Matches played: 4
- Goals scored: 23 (5.75 per match)

Awards
- Best player: Lee Cook, Trenton State

The 1964 NAIA Soccer Championship was the sixth annual tournament held by the NAIA to determine the national champion of men's college soccer among its members in the United States.

Trenton State defeated Lincoln (PA) in the final, 3–0, to claim the Lions' first NAIA national title.

The final was played at Montclair State College in Upper Montclair, New Jersey.

== Bracket ==
First Round
Lincoln (PA) | 4
Castleton State | 0
Trenton State | 7
Rockhurst | 5

Championship; Upper Montclair, NJ
Lincoln (PA) | 0
Trenton State | 3
Third Place
Castleton State | 3
Rockhurst | 1

== See also ==
- 1964 NCAA soccer tournament
