= Mike Shanahan (ice hockey) =

American businessman

- Born: Michael Francis Shanahan, Sr. October 29, 1939; University City, Missouri, U.S.
- Died: January 15, 2018 (aged 78); St. Louis, Missouri, U.S.
- Education: Saint Louis University
- Known for: Businessman, owner of St. Louis Blues
- Spouse: Mary Ann Barrett
- Parent(s): James Shanahan; Mary Shanahan
Association football career
- Position: Defender
College career
Years	Team	Apps	(Gls)
1960	Saint Louis Billikens	10	

Michael Shanahan (October 29, 1939 – January 15, 2018) was a businessman, defense contractor, and part-owner of an American professional hockey franchise, the St. Louis Blues of the National Hockey League (NHL), from 1986 through 1990.

He grew up as a son of a truck driver in University City and was a star athlete at Mercy High School. He attended St. Louis University, where he was a soccer star on Billikens soccer teams that won national championships in 1959 and 1960.

After graduating, he worked at McDonnell Douglas Automation Co., Numerical Control Inc., and Cleveland Pneumatic Co. In 1981, he co-founded Engineered Air Systems. The following year, EAS acquired Allis-Chalmers Corporation's Defense Systems Division. In 1983, he incorporated Engineered Support Systems Inc. as a holding company for the defense contracting division, and served as its president, CEO, and chairman until 2005. ESSI produced ground equipment for the military, including nuclear, biological, and chemical defense systems; environmental control systems; and water and petroleum distribution systems.

In 1986, Mayor Vincent C. Schoemehl asked if he would be interested in helping give the Blues local ownership. “That’s a question you don’t expect,” Shanahan later recalled. “But we began discussing it, and I got involved.” Shanahan led an investment group that purchased the Blues from California businessman Harry Ornest in December 1986, when Ornest was in talks to move the team to Saskatoon (Canada). At the same time, the city purchased the St. Louis Arena (1929–1999) from Ornest. His gregarious personality and daring management style made him one of the most popular executives in the region's sports history. Under his leadership in the late 1980s and early 1990s, the St. Louis Blues regained their standing as a mainstream sports attraction. In 1990, Shanahan sold his 10-percent ownership stake to an investment group called Kiel Center Partners, which built a new downtown arena in 1994. Shanahan stayed on as team chairman until 1995, when he was replaced by former Cardinals executive Jerry Ritter.

Shanahan donated more than $10 million to mostly St. Louis charitable efforts personally and through the Shanahan Family Foundation. The atrium at the business school at St. Louis University, his alma mater, is named after him.

He was inducted into the St. Louis University Billikens Hall of Fame in 1994 and the Missouri Sports Hall of Fame in 1997.

He died after a fall on January 15, 2018, aged 78. He was survived by his wife Mary Anne, his son Michael Junior, his daughters Meg and Maureen and his 13 grandchildren.
