= 1959 NCAA soccer season =

Statistics

Tournament
- Duration: November 22–December 28, 1959

College Cup
- Date: November 28, 1959
- Site: Memorial Stadium; Storrs, Connecticut
- Champions: Saint Louis
- Runners-up: Bridgeport

Seasons
- ← ISFA 1960 →

The 1959 NCAA soccer season was the inaugural season of college soccer sanctioned by the NCAA. Including the history of the ISFA, this was the 56th season of organized men's collegiate soccer in the United States.

The season culminated with the 1959 NCAA Soccer Tournament, the first of the modern NCAA Division I men's soccer tournament. The tournament was won by the Saint Louis Billikens, who defeated Bridgeport Purple Knights in the final, 5–2.

== Regular season ==
=== Champions ===
- California Intercollegiate Soccer Conference: San Francisco Community College
- New England Intercollegiate Soccer League: Bridgeport
- Ivy League: Harvard
- Metropolitan Intercollegiate Soccer Conference: Pratt
- Atlantic Coast Conference: Maryland
- New York State Athletic Conference: Cortland
- Rocky Mountain Intercollegiate League: Air Force
- Midwestern Conference: Michigan State
- Ohio Collegiate Soccer Conference: Akron
- Mason-Dixon Conference: Lynchburg
- Southern California Soccer Association: UCLA
- Middle Atlantic States Athletic Conference: Elizabethtown

=== Standings ===
1959 Ohio Collegiate Soccer Association standings
	Conf.						Overall
Team	W		L		T	PCT	W		L		T	PCT
Akron † ‍‍‍	8	–	0	–	0	1.000	8	–	2	–	0	.800
Wilmington (OH) ‍‍‍	4	–	0	–	0	1.000	4	–	0	–	0	1.000
Cleveland State ‍‍‍	7	–	1	–	0	.875	9	–	1	–	0	.900
Ohio ‍‍‍	1	–	0	–	0	1.000	1	–	0	–	0	1.000
Ohio State ‍‍‍	1	–	6	–	0	.143	1	–	8	–	0	.111
Dayton ‍‍‍	1	–	6	–	0	.143	1	–	8	–	0	.111
Denison ‍‍‍	0	–	1	–	0	.000	0	–	1	–	0	.000
Case Tech ‍‍‍	0	–	1	–	0	.000	0	–	1	–	0	.000
Grove City College ‍‍‍	0	–	1	–	0	.000	0	–	1	–	0	.000
Kenyon ‍‍‍	0	–	1	–	0	.000	0	–	1	–	0	.000
Oberlin ‍‍‍	0	–	1	–	0	.000	0	–	1	–	0	.000
Ohio Wesleyan ‍‍‍	0	–	1	–	0	.000	0	–	1	–	0	.000
† – Conference champion + – Invited to the 1959 NCAA Soccer Tournament; As of November 28, 1959; Rankings from United Soccer Coaches

1959 Ivy League men's soccer standings
	Conf.						Overall
Team	W		L		T	PCT	W		L		T	PCT
Harvard † ‍‍‍	5	–	1	–	0	.833	9	–	1	–	3	.808
Princeton ‍‍‍	4	–	2	–	0	.667	7	–	3	–	0	.700
Penn ‍‍‍	3	–	1	–	2	.667	7	–	2	–	2	.727
Yale ‍‍‍	3	–	2	–	1	.583	6	–	4	–	1	.591
Brown ‍‍‍	3	–	2	–	1	.583	7	–	6	–	3	.531
Dartmouth ‍‍‍	1	–	5	–	0	.167	4	–	6	–	0	.400
Cornell ‍‍‍	0	–	6	–	0	.000	2	–	7	–	0	.222
*† – Conference champion + – Invited to the 1959 NCAA Soccer Tournament; As of November 28, 1959; Rankings from United Soccer Coaches

== Postseason ==
=== NCAA Tournament ===
Semifinals
Saint Louis	6
CCNY	2
Bridgeport (10OT)	2
West Chester State	1

Final
Saint Louis	5
Bridgeport	2

== Awards ==
=== All-Americans ===
The following players were named All-Americans following the 1959 season.

- G - John Santos, Farleigh-Dickinson
- RF - James Gallo, Temple
- LF - Bohdan Huryn, Fenn College
- RH - Peter Hazahiak, Howard
- CH - John Dueker, St. Louis
- LH - Joseph Cosgrove, Baltimore
- OR - James Taylor, Colgate
- IR - Walter Chyzowych, Temple
- CF - Cecil Heron, Michigan State
- IL - Erich Streder, Michigan State
- OL - Adam Pintz, Fenn College
