= NAIA men's soccer championship =

Annual college soccer tournament in the United States

NAIA Men's Soccer Championship
- Organizer(s): NAIA
- Founded: 1959
- Region: United States; Canada
- Current champion: Grand View (1st)
- Most championships: Quincy (11 titles)
- Website: naia.org/msoc

The NAIA Men's Soccer Championship is the annual tournament to determine the national champions of NAIA men's college soccer in the United States and Canada. It has been held annually since 1959.

The most successful program is Quincy (IL), with 11 NAIA national titles.

The current champions are Grand View, who won their first men's national title in 2025.

== Results ==
NAIA Men's Soccer Championship
Ed.	Year	Championship match			Host city
Ed.	Year	Champion	Score	Runner-up	Host city
1	1959	Pratt Institute (1)	4−3 (a.e.t.)	Elizabethtown	Slippery Rock, Pennsylvania
2	1960	Elizabethtown (1) (Note: Title shared.); Newark Engineering (1)	2−2 (a.e.t.)	–	Slippery Rock, Pennsylvania
3	1961	Howard (1)	3−2	Newark Engineering	Lock Haven, Pennsylvania
4	1962	East Stroudsburg State (1)	4−0	Pratt Institute	Richmond, Indiana
5	1963	Earlham (1); Castleton State (1)	– (Note: 1963 championship game canceled due to snow; teams declared co-champions.)	–	Frostburg, Maryland
6	1964	Trenton State (1)	3−0	Lincoln (PA)	Upper Montclair, New Jersey
7	1965	Trenton State (2)	6−2	Earlham	Kansas City, Missouri
8	1966	Quincy (1)	6−1	Trenton State	Belmont, North Carolina
9	1967	Quincy (2)	3−1	Rockhurst	Quincy, Illinois
10	1968	Davis & Elkins (1)	2−1 (a.e.t.)	Quincy	Quincy, Illinois
11	1969	Eastern Illinois (1)	1−0 (a.e.t.)	Davis & Elkins	Richmond, Indiana
12	1970	Davis & Elkins (2)	2−0	Quincy	Dunn, North Carolina
13	1971	Quincy (3)	1−0	Davis & Elkins	Dunn, North Carolina
14	1972	Westmont (1)	2−1 (a.e.t.)	– (Note: Davis & Elkins vacated second place in 1972 due to having fielded an ineligible player.)	Dunn, North Carolina
15	1973	Quincy (4)	3−0	Rockhurst	Florissant, Missouri
16	1974	Quincy (5)	6−0	Davis & Elkins	Florissant, Missouri
17	1975	Quincy (6)	1−0	Simon Fraser	Raleigh, North Carolina
18	1976	Simon Fraser (1)	1−0	Rockhurst	Pasadena, California
19	1977	Quincy (7)	3−0	Keene State	Huntsville, Alabama
20	1978	Quincy (8)	2−0	Alabama−Huntsville	Huntsville, Alabama
21	1979	Quincy (9)	1−0	Rockhurst	Springfield, Illinois
22	1980	Quincy (10)	1−0 (a.e.t.)	Simon Fraser	Springfield, Illinois
23	1981	Quincy (11)	4−1	Alderson−Broaddus	Springfield, Illinois
24	1982	Simon Fraser (2)	4−0	Midwestern State	Wichita Falls, Texas
25	1983	Simon Fraser (3)	1−0	Midwestern State	Wichita Falls, Texas
26	1984	West Virginia Wesleyan (1)	3−2 (a.e.t.)	Fresno Pacific	Fresno, California
27	1985	West Virginia Wesleyan (2)	4−3 (a.e.t.)	Fresno Pacific	Spartanburg, South Carolina
28	1986	Sangamon State (1)	1−0	Simon Fraser	Wichita Falls, Texas
29	1987	Lynn (1)	1−0 (a.e.t.)	Simon Fraser	Wichita Falls, Texas
30	1988	Sangamon State (1)	3−1	Alderson−Broaddus	Fort Lauderdale, Florida
31	1989	West Virginia Wesleyan (3)	1−0	Lynn	Las Cruces, New Mexico
32	1990	West Virginia Wesleyan (4)	3−1	Lynn	Boca Raton, Florida
33	1991	Lynn (1)	2−1 (a.e.t.)	Midwestern State	Boca Raton, Florida
34	1992	Belhaven (1)	2−1	Lynn	San Antonio, Texas
35	1993	Sangamon State (3)	4−3 (a.e.t.)	Lynn	San Antonio, Texas
36	1994	West Virginia Wesleyan (5)	4−2	Mobile	Mobile, Alabama
37	1995	Lindsey Wilson (1)	2−1	Midwestern State	Mobile, Alabama
38	1996	Lindsey Wilson (2)	5−0	Birmingham−Southern	Birmingham, Alabama
39	1997	Seattle (1)	2−1 (a.e.t.)	Rockhurst	Birmingham, Alabama
40	1998	Lindsey Wilson (3)	2−1	Illinois−Springfield	Birmingham, Alabama
41	1999	Lindsey Wilson (4)	2−1	Mobile	Albuquerque, New Mexico
42	2000	Lindsey Wilson (5)	2−1 (a.e.t.)	Auburn−Montgomery	Albuquerque, New Mexico
43	2001	Lindsey Wilson (6)	4−0	Auburn−Montgomery	Bowling Green, Kentucky
44	2002	Mobile (1)	2−1	Park (Note: Park vacated second place in 2002 due to having fielded an ineligible player.)	Bowling Green, Kentucky
45	2003	Rio Grande (1)	1−0	Fresno Pacific	Olathe, Kansas
46	2004	Lindenwoood (1)	1−0	Auburn−Montgomery	Olathe, Kansas
47	2005	Lindsey Wilson (1)	4−1	Azusa Pacific	Daytona Beach, Florida
48	2006	Graceland (1)	0−0 (a.e.t.) (7–6 p)	Azusa Pacific	Daytona Beach, Florida
49	2007	Azusa Pacific (1)	2−0	Concordia (CA)	Olathe, Kansas
50	2008	Bethel (TN) (1)	2−1 (a.e.t.)	Rio Grande	Fresno, California
51	2009	Lindsey Wilson (2)	1−0	The Master's (CA)	Fresno, California
52	2010	Hastings (1)	5−3	Notre Dame (OH)	Orange Beach, Alabama
53	2011	Lindsey Wilson (3)	3−2	Hastings	Orange Beach, Alabama
54	2012	Belhaven (1)	2−0	Mobile	Montgomery, Alabama
55	2013	Martin Methodist (1)	2−1 (a.e.t.)	Auburn−Montgomery	Montgomery, Alabama
56	2014	Davenport (1)	2−1 (a.e.t.)	Texas−Brownsville	Delray Beach, Florida
57	2015	Rio Grande (2)	1−0 (a.e.t.)	MidAmerica Nazarene	Delray Beach, Florida
58	2016	Hastings (2)	1−0	Rio Grande	Delray Beach, Florida
59	2017	Wayland Baptist (1)	1–0 (a.e.t.)	Missouri Valley	Delray Beach, Florida
60	2018	Central Methodist (1)	1–1 (a.e.t.) (4–3 p)	Missouri Valley	Irvine, California
61	2019	Central Methodist (2)	3–1	Hastings	Irvine, California
62	2020	Missouri Valley (1)	2–0	Oklahoma Wesleyan	Evans, Georgia
63	2021	Keiser (1)	2–0	Mobile	Decatur, Alabama
64	2022	Bethel (IN) (1)	3–1	Mobile	Decatur, Alabama
65	2023	MidAmerica Nazarene (1)	2–1	Milligan	Wichita, Kansas
66	2024	Dalton State (1)	0−0 (a.e.t.) (3–2 p)	William Penn	Wichita, Kansas
67	2025	Grand View (1)	2−1	WVU Tech	Orange Beach, Alabama

== Champions ==
=== Active NAIA programs ===
Team	Titles	Years
Lindsey Wilson	9	1995, 1996, 1998, 1999, 2000, 2001, 2005, 2009, 2011
Hastings	2	2010, 2016
Rio Grande (OH)	2	2003, 2015
Central Methodist	2	2018, 2019
Grand View	1	2025
Dalton State	1	2024
MidAmerica Nazarene	1	2023
Bethel (IN)	1	2022
Keiser	1	2021
Missouri Valley	1	2020
Wayland Baptist	1	2017
Tennessee Southern	1	2013
Bethel (TN)	1	2008
Graceland	1	2006
Mobile	1	2002

=== Former NAIA programs ===
Team	Titles	Years
Quincy (Note: No longer NAIA members)	11	1966, 1967, 1971, 1973, 1974, 1975, 1977, 1978, 1979, 1980, 1981
Simon Fraser	5	1984, 1985, 1989, 1990, 1994
Illinois–Springfield	3	1986, 1988, 1993
West Virginia Wesleyan	3	1976, 1982, 1983
Belhaven	2	1992, 2012
Lynn	2	1987, 1991
Davis & Elkins	2	1968, 1970
TCNJ	2	1964, 1965
Davenport	1	2014
Azusa Pacific	1	2007
Lindenwood	1	2004
Seattle	1	1997
Westmont	1	1972
Eastern Illinois	1	1969
Earlham	1	1963*
Castleton	1	1963*
East Stroudsburg	1	1962
Howard	1	1961
NJIT	1	1960*
Elizabethtown	1	1960*
Pratt	1	1959

== Players ==
The following players have gone on to play at a professional level after playing in the NAIA competition.

Athlete	NAIA School	MLS/NASL/MISL/USL Team
Micheal Azira	Mobile (Ala.)	Seattle Sounders
Casey Barton	Tabor (Kan.)	Kansas City Comets
Joe Barton	Point Loma Nazarene (Calif.)	Atlanta Silverbacks
Sam Bick	Quincy (IL)	Minnesota Kicks
Milton Blanco	Fresno Pacific (Calif.)	C.D. Chivas
Brady Bryant	Mobile (Ala.)	Wilmington Hammerheads
Pablo Campos	Fresno Pacific (Calif.)	Real Salt Lake
Mesac Celeste	Lee (Tenn.)	Cincinnati Kings
Tony Chursky	Simon Fraser (B.C.)	Seattle Sounders
Frank Ciaccia	Simon Fraser (B.C.)	Toronto Blizzard
Daniel Clitnovici	University of Mary (N.D.)	Universitatea Craiova (Romania)
Andrew Corazza	Simon Fraser (B.C.)	Vancouver Whitecaps
Patrick Daka	Western Baptist (Ore.)	Charlotte Eagles
Eric Delabar	Quincy (IL)	St. Louis Steamers
Dino Delevski	Oklahoma City	Kansas City Comets
Tafaria Fray	St. Gregory's (Okla.)	Charlotte Eagles
Brian Gant	Simon Fraser (B.C.)	Portland Timbers
Bruce Gant	Simon Fraser (B.C.)	Minnesota Kicks
Joey Gjertsen	Evergreen State (Wash.)	Vancouver Whitecaps
James Gledhill	Mobile (Ala.)	Wilmington Hammerheads
Diego Gutierrez	Rockhurst (Mo.)	Kansas City Wizards
Danny Harvey	Bryan (Tenn.)	Charlotte Eagles
Nate Houser	Baker (Kan.)	Baltimore Blast
Juan Pablo Irrera	Columbia (Mo.)	Puerto Rico Islanders
Declan Jogi	King (Tenn.)	Charlotte Eagles
Emilio John	Quincy (IL)	St. Louis Steamers
Daniel Karamoy	Sterling College (Kan.)	Bhayangkara Presisi Lampung (Indonesia)
Paul Kato	Spring Arbor College (Mich.)	Kalamazoo Kangaroos
Lindsay Kennedy	Harris-Stowe State (Mo.)	St. Louis Steamers
Steve Kindel	Simon Fraser (B.C.)	Vancouver Whitecaps
Erik Lefebvre	Houghton College (N.Y.)	Charlotte Eagles
Chris Lemons	Oklahoma Christian	Charlotte Eagles
Steven Lenhart	Azusa Pacific (Ca.)	San Jose Earthquakes
Tyrone Marshall	Lindsey Wilson (Ky.)	LA Galaxy
Kevin McCloskey	Rio Grande (Ohio)	Cincinnati Kings
John McGrane	Simon Fraser (B.C.)	Los Angeles Aztecs
Mike McLenaghen	Simon Fraser (B.C.)	Portland Timbers
Ben Meek	Westmont (Calif.)	Charlotte Eagles
Johnny Menyongar	Lindsey Wilson (Ky.)	Minnesota Thunder
Bruce Miller	Simon Fraser (B.C.)	Fort Lauderdale Strikers
Stephen Murray	Lambuth (Tenn.)	Wilmington Hammerheads
Adauto Neto	Mobile (Ala.)	Cleveland Force
Shawn Peterson	Fresno Pacific (Ca.)	Charlotte Eagles/Birmingham Grasshoppers
Buzz Parsons	Simon Fraser (B.C.)	Vancouver Whitecaps
Jim Pollihan	Quincy (IL)	Rochester Lancers
Orlando Ramírez	Fresno Pacific (Calif.)	San Jose Earthquakes
Randy Ragan	Simon Fraser (B.C.)	Toronto Blizzard
Paul Rayment	Alderson Broaddus	Toronto Blizzard
Addae Rique	Missouri Baptist	St. Louis Steamers
Greg Robertson	Spring Arbor College (Mich.)	Ft. Lauderdale Strikers
Lee Rogers	Spring Arbor College (Mich.)	Milwaukee Wave
Craig Scheer	Illinois-Springfield	Kansas City Comets
Carl Schwarzen	Quincy (IL)	St. Louis Stars
Kevin Sloan	Catawba (N.C.)	Philadelphia Kixx
Derek Smith	Union (Ky.)	Cincinnati Kings
Josiah Snelgrove	Houghton College (N.Y.)	Rochester Lancers
Mike Sweeney	Simon Fraser (B.C.)	Edmonton Drillers
Jacob Ward	Azusa Pacific University (Calif.)	San Diego Sockers
Gannon Webb	William Carey (Miss.)	Wilmington Hammerheads
