= 1976 NCAA Division III soccer tournament =

1976 NCAA Division III Soccer Championship
Tournament details
- Country: United States
- Teams: 16

Final positions
- Champions: Brandeis (1st title)
- Runners-up: Brockport State

Tournament statistics
- Matches played: 16
- Goals scored: 57 (3.56 per match)
- Top goal scorer(s): Cleveland Lewis, Brockport State (6)

Awards
- Best player: Offense: Cleveland Lewis, Brockport State; Defense: Arn Armstrong, Brockport State

The 1976 NCAA Division III Soccer Championship was the third annual tournament held by the NCAA to determine the best men's Division III college soccer program in the United States.

The finals were played at Elizabethtown College in Elizabethtown, Pennsylvania.

Brandeis defeated Brockport State in the final, 2–1 after two overtime periods, claiming the Judges' first NCAA Division III national title.

== Bracket ==
First Round
Westfield State | 3
WPI | 3
SE Massachusetts | 0
Brandeis | 2
Lynchburg | 0
Grove City | 2
Elizabethtown | 1
Haverford | 0
Ohio Wesleyan | 1
Wheaton (IL) | 2*
MacMurray | 2
Wooster | 1
Brockport State | 1*
St. Lawrence | 0
Cortland State | 3
Drew | 2

Quarterfinals
WPI | 5
Brandeis | 6**
Grove City | 1
Elizabethtown | 3
Wheaton (IL) | 1
MacMurray | 2*
Brockport State | 3*
Cortland State | 2

Semifinals
Brandeis | 3*
Elizabethtown | 2
MacMurray | 0
Brockport State | 1

Final
Brandeis | 2**
Brockport State | 1
Third place
Elizabethtown | 2
MacMurray | 1

== Final ==
November 27, 1976

| Brandeis | 2–1 (2OT) | Brockport State |

Elizabethtown, Pennsylvania
Attendance: 2000

== See also ==
- 1976 NCAA Division I Soccer Tournament
- 1976 NCAA Division II Soccer Championship
- 1976 NAIA Soccer Championship
