= 1961 NAIA soccer championship =

1961 NAIA Soccer Championship

Tournament details
- Country: United States
- Teams: 4

Final positions
- Champions: Howard (1st title)
- Runners-up: Newark Engineering

Tournament statistics
- Matches played: 4
- Goals scored: 18 (4.5 per match)

Awards
- Best player: Noel Carr, Howard

The 1961 NAIA Soccer Championship was the third annual tournament held by the NAIA to determine the national champion of men's college soccer among its members in the United States.

Howard defeated defending co-national champions Newark Engineering in the final, 3–2, to win their first NAIA national title.

The final was played at Lock Haven State College in Lock Haven, Pennsylvania.

== Bracket ==
First Round
Newark Engineering	3
Tabor	0
Howard	4
East Stroudsburg State	3

Championship; Lock Haven, PA
Newark Engineering	2
Howard	3
Third Place
Tabor	1
East Stoudsburg State	2

== See also ==
- 1961 NCAA soccer tournament
