= 1995 NCAA Division II men's soccer tournament =

1995 NCAA Division II Men's Soccer Championship
Tournament details
- Country: United States
- Teams: 12

Final positions
- Champions: Southern Connecticut (4th title, 6th final)
- Runners-up: USC Spartanburg (1st final)

Tournament statistics
- Matches played: 11
- Goals scored: 30 (2.73 per match)
- Top goal scorer(s): (Israel) Gil Hokayma, Southern Connecticut (3)
- All statistics correct as of 11/3/2019.

The 1995 NCAA Division II Men's Soccer Championship was the 24th annual tournament held by the NCAA to determine the top men's Division II college soccer program in the United States.

Southern Connecticut State (21-1-1) defeated South Carolina–Spartanburg, 2–0, in the final.

This was the fourth national title for the Owls, who were coached by Ray Reid.

== Bracket ==
First Round; *Campus sites
*	USC Spartanburg	2
Presbyterian	0
Mercyhurst	2
*	East Stroudsburg	0
*	So. Connecticut	1
N.H. College	0
Grand Canyon	1
*	Seattle Pacific	0

Quarterfinals; *Campus sites
*	Tampa	0
USC Spartanburg	1
*	NE Missouri State	0
Mercyhurst	1
*	Franklin Pierce	2
So. Connecticut	4(2OT)
*	Cal State Bakersfield	5(2OT)
Grand Canyon	1

Semifinals; *Campus sites
*	USC Spartanburg	3(3OT)
Mercyhurst	2
So. Connecticut	2(3OT)
Cal State Bakersfield	1

Final; December 3 Spartanburg, SC
USC Spartanburg	0
So. Connecticut	2

== Final ==
December 3, 1995
13:30 EST (UTC−5)

USC Spartanburg	0–2	Southern Connecticut
	Report	Gil Hokayma 21' (Houser); Carlos Rocha 27' (Hokayma)

Spartanburg, SC
Attendance: 2,500

== See also ==
- NCAA Division I Men's Soccer Championship
- NCAA Division III Men's Soccer Championship
- NAIA Men's Soccer Championship
