= 1976 NAIA soccer championship =

1976 NAIA Soccer Championship

Tournament details
- Country: United States; Canada
- Venue: Pasadena, California
- Teams: 8

Final positions
- Champions: Simon Fraser (1st title)
- Runners-up: Rockhurst
- Third place: Quincy (IL)
- Fourth place: Davis & Elkins

Tournament statistics
- Matches played: 12
- Goals scored: 56 (4.67 per match)

Awards
- Best player: Darryl Wallace, Simon Fraser

The 1976 NAIA Soccer Championship was the 18th annual tournament held by the NAIA to determine the national champion of men's college soccer among its members in the United States and Canada.

Simon Fraser defeated Rockhurst in the final, 1–0, to claim the Clan's first NAIA national title. This was the first title for a team from Canada.

The final was played in Pasadena, California.

== Qualification ==
The tournament field remained fixed at eight teams. Third-, fifth-, and seventh-placed finals remained in place alongside the national championship match.

Qualified Teams
School	Appearance	Last Bid
Alabama–Huntsville	1st	Never
Davis & Elkins	8th	1974
Houghton	2nd	1975
Maine–Portland-Gorham	1st	Never
Quincy (IL)	10th	1975
Rockhurst	6th	1975
Simon Fraser	2nd	1975
Spring Arbor	1st	1969

== Bracket ==
Fifth place
2OT
Maine–Portland-Gorham	3
Houghton	4
Seventh place
Alabama–Huntsville	4
Spring Arbor	2

Consolation semifinals
Alabama–Huntsville	4
Maine–Portland-Gorham	7
2OT
Spring Arbor	4
Houghton	5

First round
Davis & Elkins	1
Alabama–Huntsville	0
Rockhurst	2
Maine–Portland-Gorham	0
Simon Fraser	5
Spring Arbor	1
Quincy (IL)	4
Houghton	0

Championship semifinals
14OT
Davis & Elkins	1
Rockhurst	2
OT
Simon Fraser	2
Quincy (IL)	1

Championship
Rockhurst	0
Simon Fraser	1
Third place
OT
Davis & Elkins	1
Quincy (IL)	2

== See also ==
- 1976 NCAA Division I soccer tournament
- 1976 NCAA Division II soccer tournament
- 1976 NCAA Division III soccer tournament
