= Peter Johansson (Swedish footballer) =

Swedish footballer and manager (born 1955)

Personal information
- Full name: Peter Johansson
- Date of birth: 3 September 1956 (age 70)
- Place of birth: Växjo, Sweden
- Position: Forward

Youth career
- Nättraby GoIF

College career
Years	Team	Apps	(Gls)
1979–1982	Tampa Spartans		(57)

Senior career*
Years	Team	Apps	(Gls)
1974–1977	Östers IF		
1978	GAIS	22	(2)
1981–1982	Karlskrona AIF		
1983–1984	Tampa Bay Rowdies (indoor)		
- Växjö Norra IF
- Västra Torsås IF
- Hanaskogs IS
- Tingsryds AIF

Managerial career
- Tingsryds AIF
- Ingelstads IK
- 1998–1999: Östers IF Women
- 2005: IFK Värnamo
- 2006: IFK Hässleholm
- 2007–2009: IFK Värnamo
- 2010: Linköpings FC
- 2014–2016: IFK Värnamo
- * Club domestic league appearances and goals

Peter "Kosta" Johansson (born 3 September 1956) is a Swedish former football player.

== Career ==
A forward, Johansson started his career in Allsvenskan with Östers IF before moving to play with GAIS and representing the Swedish national team.

As a 25-year-old college junior, Johansson scored a golden goal in the final of the 1981 NCAA Division II Soccer Championship to give the Tampa Spartans their first national championship. He finished his college career as UT's all-time scoring leader with 57 goals.

In December 1983, he signed a contract with the Tampa Bay Rowdies and remained with them through the remainder of the 1983–84 indoor season.
