= Carl Schwarzen =

American soccer player

Personal information
- Date of birth: August 29, 1943 (age 83)
- Place of birth: St. Louis, Missouri, United States
- Position: Midfielder

Youth career
- Quincy University

Senior career*
Years	Team	Apps	(Gls)
1967	St. Louis Stars	3	(0)
- * Club domestic league appearances and goals

Carl Schwarzen (born August 29, 1943) is a retired American soccer midfielder who played professionally for one season in the National Professional Soccer League.

In 1961, Schwarzen graduated from Bishop DuBourg High School. He is a member of the school's Athletic Hall of Fame. Schwarzen attended Quincy University, where he was a 1966 Honorable Mention (third team) All-American soccer player. That year, Quincy won the NAIA national men's soccer championship. In 2006, Schwarzen, along with the entire 1966 Quincy soccer team was inducted into the university's Athletic Hall of Fame.

In 1967, Schwarzen became one of three native-born Americans to play in the newly established National Professional Soccer League when he signed with the St. Louis Stars. In 2016, Schwarzen was inducted into the St. Louis Soccer Hall of Fame.
