= 1961 West Chester Golden Rams men's soccer team =

American college soccer season

1961 West Chester Golden Rams men's soccer

National Champions

NCAA Tournament, W 2–0 vs. Saint Louis
- Conference: Independent
- Record: 13–0–0
- Head coach: Mel Lorback (4th season)
- Home stadium: WCU Soccer Field

The 1961 West Chester Golden Rams men's soccer team represented West Chester University during the 1961 NCAA men's soccer season. The Golden Rams team was an independent, and had a perfect 13–0–0 record throughout the season.

The Rams went on to win the 1961 NCAA Men's Soccer Championship by defeating the two-time defending champions, Saint Louis Billikens, 2–0 in the final. This made West Chester the second team ever to win the NCAA Soccer title.

West Chester's roster included future Indiana soccer coaching legend Jerry Yeagley.

== Schedule ==
Date Time, TV	Rank^{#}	Opponent^{#}	Result	Record	Site City, State
Regular season
*		WCU Alumni	W 3–1	1–0	West Chester, PA
*		at Penn State	W 4–1	2–0	State College, PA
*		Baltimore	W 4–1	3–0	West Chester, PA
*		at Duke	W 2–1	4–0	Durham, NC
*		at North Carolina	W 2–0	5–0	Chapel Hill, NC
*		Temple	W 1–0	6–0	West Chester, PA
*		Navy	W 5–0	7–0	West Chester, PA
*		at La Salle	W 3–1	8–0	Philadelphia, PA
*		Pittsburgh	W 3–1	9–0	West Chester, PA
*		at Army	W 1–0	10–0	West Point, NY
NCAA Tournament
*		Maryland; Quarterfinals	W 4–2	11–0	West Chester, PA
*		vs. Bridgeport; Semifinals	W 2–0	12–0	St. Louis, MO
*		at Saint Louis; Championship	W 2–0	13–0	St. Louis, MO
*Non-conference game. ^{#}Rankings from United Soccer Coaches. (#) Tournament seedings in parentheses.
