= 1975 NCAA Division II soccer tournament =

1975 NCAA Division II Soccer Championship
Tournament details
- Country: United States
- Teams: 16

Final positions
- Champions: Baltimore (1st title)
- Runner-up: Seattle Pacific (2nd title game)
- Third place: Adelphi

Tournament statistics
- Matches played: 16
- Goals scored: 58 (3.63 per match)

The 1975 NCAA Division II Soccer Championship was the fourth annual tournament held by the NCAA to determine the top men's Division II college soccer program in the United States.

Baltimore defeated Seattle Pacific in the final match, 3–1, to win their first national title. The final was played in Seattle, Washington on November 29, 1975.

== Bracket ==
First Round; *Campus sites
*	Adelphi	2
Bentley	1
*	New Haven	0
Le Moyne	3
*	Cal State Hayward	4
UC Riverside	0
*	Seattle Pacific	2
UC Davis	1
*	Eastern Illinois	2
UW–Green Bay	3(4OT)
*	Western Illinois	0
Missouri–Saint Louis	1
*	Baltimore	3
Randolph–Macon	0
*	Loyola (MD)	0
Old Dominion	1

Quarterfinals; *Campus sites
*	Adelphi	6
Le Moyne	0
*	Cal State–Hayward	1
Seattle Pacific	2
*	UW–Green Bay	2
Missouri–Saint Louis	1
*	Baltimore	1
Old Dominion	0

Semifinals
Adelphi	0
Seattle Pacific	1
UW–Green Bay	2
Baltimore	5

Final; November 29, 1976; Seattle, WA
Seattle Pacific	1
Baltimore	3
Third place
Adelphi	9
Wisconsin–Green Bay	1

== Final ==
November 29, 1975

Seattle Pacific	1–3	Baltimore
Jose Rays 5' (Zell)	Report 1 Report 2 Report 3	Leon Mach 31:09'; Pete Caringi 48:39' (Thumma); Pete Caringi 69:33' (Mach)

Memorial Stadium, Seattle, Washington
Attendance: 8,000

== See also ==
- 1975 NCAA Division I Soccer Tournament
- 1975 NCAA Division III Soccer Championship
- 1975 NAIA Soccer Championship
