= 1959 NAIA soccer championship =

1959 NAIA Men's Soccer Championship

Tournament details
- Country: United States
- Teams: 4

Final positions
- Champions: Pratt Institute; 1st title 1st title game
- Runners-up: Elizabethtown; 1st title game

Tournament statistics
- Matches played: 4
- Goals scored: 19 (4.75 per match)

Awards
- Best player: Robert Offerman, Pratt

The 1959 NAIA Soccer Championship was the inaugural tournament held by the NAIA to determine the national champion of men's college soccer among its members in the United States.

Pratt defeated Elizabethtown in the championship match, 4–3 (after two overtime periods), to win their first NAIA national title. The final was played at Slippery Rock State College in Slippery Rock, Pennsylvania.

== Bracket ==
First Round
Elizabethtown	5
Howard	2
Pratt Institute	2
New Bedford Tech	1

Championship; Slippery Rock, PA
Elizabethtown	3
Pratt Institute (NY)	4**
Third Place
Howard	2
New Bedford Tech	0

== See also ==
- 1959 NCAA soccer tournament
