= Harry Ornest =

Sports entrepreneur (1923–1998)

- Born: June 30, 1923; Edmonton, Alberta, Canada
- Died: July 21, 1998 (aged 75); Los Angeles, California, U.S.
- Resting place: Hillside Memorial Park; Culver City, California
- Occupation: Sports entrepreneur
- Organizations: National Hockey League; Canadian Football League; Pacific Coast League

Harry Ornest (June 30, 1923 – July 21, 1998) was a sports entrepreneur who once owned the St. Louis Blues of the National Hockey League (NHL) and the Toronto Argonauts of the Canadian Football League (CFL). He also played minor league baseball, was a linesman in the NHL, and a referee in the American Hockey League.

== Biography ==
Ornest was born in Edmonton, Canada, the son of immigrants from Eastern Europe. He is of Jewish descent. He made his fortune in vending machines. In 1978 he founded the minor league baseball franchise, the Vancouver Canadians, which played in the Pacific Coast League. He purchased a majority of the assets of Sick's Stadium in Seattle for $60,000 to use in the new team's ballpark, Nat Bailey Stadium.

== St. Louis Blues ownership ==
Ornest was the owner of the St. Louis Blues from 1983 to 1986. Ornest proved to be the savior for a city that was on the verge of losing their team. Although the Blues maintained consistency in making the Stanley Cup playoffs since 1980, financial troubles had racked the team. At the time, it was owned by Ralston Purina, a pet food giant based in the city. They lost nearly $2 million a year for six straight years before Ralston wanted to re-focus their attention back to profits. The only thing that would stand between them moving to Saskatoon, Saskatchewan ended up being the Board of Governors, who rejected an attempt to move the gutted team (which fired 60% of their staff) there. Ralston and the NHL soon sued each other and each came up with ultimatums involving dissolving the assets of the team. August 6 was the deadline before the NHL would have held a dispersal draft.

Days before the deadline, Ornest and a group of city-based investors made a bid for the team, and on July 27, the league approved the bid. He ran the team on a shoestring budget while utilizing deferred salaries to meet costs, including having fewer players on contract than other teams and trading players when dealing with salary pinching; Mike Liut was the most notable case of this, as he was traded in the middle of the 1984-85 season to the Hartford Whalers despite the Blues leading the division.

When he owned the Blues, Ornest changed their arena's name from the Checkerdome back to the St. Louis Arena. In his three seasons of ownership, the team went 106-106-28 while reaching the postseason all three years, which included making the Campbell Conference Finals in 1986, something they would not accomplish again until 2001.

In 1986, he sold the team to Missouri native Mike Shanahan while selling the Arena to the city of St. Louis (mayor Vincent C. Schoemehl had approached Shanahan about becoming an owner).

== Toronto Argonauts ownership ==
He owned the Toronto Argonauts from 1988 to 1991.
