= 1966 NAIA soccer championship =

1966 NAIA Soccer Championship

Tournament details
- Country: United States
- Venue(s): Belmont Abbey College; Belmont, North Carolina
- Teams: 4

Final positions
- Champions: Quincy (IL) (1st title)
- Runners-up: Trenton State

Tournament statistics
- Matches played: 4
- Goals scored: 18 (4.5 per match)

Awards
- Best player: Edmundo Comacho, Quincy (IL)

The 1966 NAIA Soccer Championship was the eighth annual tournament held by the NAIA to determine the national champion of men's college soccer among its members in the United States.

Quincy (IL) defeated two-time defending champions Trenton State in the final, 6–1, to claim the Hawks' first NAIA national title.

The final was played at Belmont Abbey College in Belmont, North Carolina.

== Bracket ==
First Round
Quincy (IL)	2
Gordon	0
Trenton State	4
Belmont Abbey	1

Championship; Belmont, NC
Quincy (IL)	6
Trenton State	1
Third Place
Gordon	4
Belmont Abbey	0

== See also ==
- 1966 NCAA soccer tournament
