= 1959 Saint Louis Billikens men's soccer team =

American college soccer season

1959 Saint Louis Billikens men's soccer
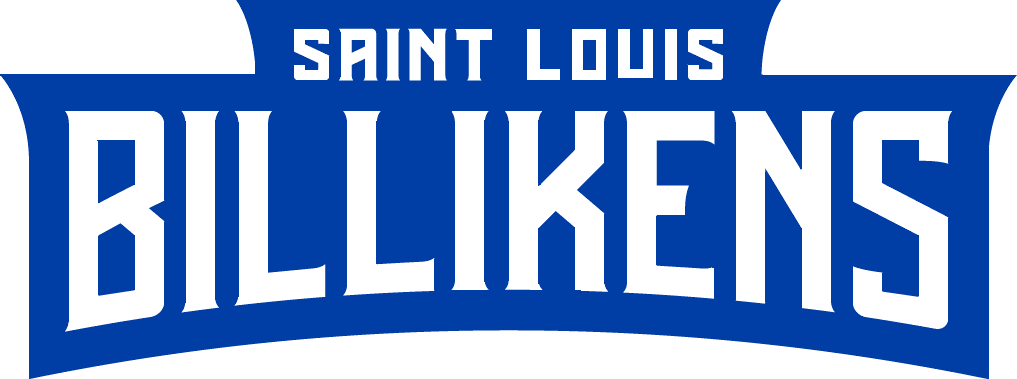

National Champions

NCAA Tournament, W 5–2 vs. Bridgeport
- Conference: Midwestern Conference
- Record: 11–1–0 (N/A Midwestern)
- Head coach: Bob Guelker (2nd season)

The 1959 Saint Louis Billikens men's soccer team represented Saint Louis University during the 1959 NCAA soccer season. The Billikens won the first ever national title this season. It was the second ever season the Billikens fielded a men's varsity soccer team, and it is considered by many American soccer historians to be the start of a dynasty.

== Roster ==
- Tom Barry
- Gene Block (GK)
- John Dueker
- George Endler
- Robert Endler
- John Fuchs
- Pat Griffard
- Bob Kauffman
- John Klein
- Jerry Knobbe
- Bob Malone
- Terry Malone
- Lee Manna
- John Michalski
- William Mueller (Gk)
- Bob Pisoni
- Don Range
- Tom Richmond
- Mike Shanahan
- Tom Trost

== Schedule ==
Date Time, TV	Rank^{#}	Opponent^{#}	Result	Record	Site City, State
Regular season
09-26-1959*		at Dayton	W 10–0	1–0–0	Dayton, OH
10-03-1959*		at Illinois	W 6–1	2–0–0	Champaign, IL
10-07-1959*		MacMurray	W 11–1	3–0–0	St. Louis, MO
10-11-1959*		Indiana	W 5–0	4–0–0	St. Louis, MO
10-17-1959		at Michigan State	W 4–2	5–0–0	East Lansing, MI
10-24-1959		Chicago	W 6–0	6–0–0	St. Louis, MO
10-31-1959		Navy Pier	W 8–0	7–0–0	St. Louis, MO
11-07-1959		at Wheaton	L 1–2	7–1–0	Wheaton, IL
11-14-1959*		Purdue	W 5–0	8–1–0	St. Louis, MO
NCAA Tournament
11-22-1959*		vs. San Francisco; First round	W 4–0	9–1–0	Storrs, CT
11-26-1959*		vs. CCNY; Semifinals	W 6–2	10–1–0	Storrs, CT
11-28-1959*		vs. Bridgeport; Final	W 5–2	11–1–0	Storrs, CT
*Non-conference game. ^{#}Rankings from United Soccer Coaches. (#) Tournament seedings in parentheses.
