= 1975 NAIA soccer championship =

1975 NAIA Soccer Championship

Tournament details
- Country: United States; Canada
- Venue: Raleigh, North Carolina
- Teams: 8

Final positions
- Champions: Quincy (IL) (6th title)
- Runners-up: Simon Fraser
- Third place: Rockhurst
- Fourth place: Western New England

Tournament statistics
- Matches played: 12
- Goals scored: 49 (4.08 per match)

Awards
- Best player: (Canada) (Scotland) John McGrane, Simon Fraser

The 1975 NAIA Soccer Championship was the 17th annual tournament held by the NAIA to determine the national champion of men's college soccer among its members in the United States.

Two-time defending champions Quincy (IL) defeated Simon Fraser in the final, 1–0, to claim the Hawks' sixth NAIA national title. This was the first championship appearance by a team from Canada.

The final was played in Raleigh, North Carolina.

== Qualification ==
The tournament field remained fixed at eight teams. Third-, fifth-, and seventh-placed finals remained in place alongside the national championship match.

Qualified Teams
School	Appearance	Last Bid
Campbell	3rd	1970
Fredonia State	2nd	1972
Houghton	1st	Never
Huntington	1st	Never
Quincy (IL)	9th	1974
Rockhurst	5th	1973
Simon Fraser	1st	Never
Western New England	1st	Never

== Bracket ==
Fifth place
Fredonia State	4
Campbell	3
Seventh place
Huntington	3
Houghton	0

Consolation semifinals
Huntington	1
Fredonia State	2
Houghton	1
Campbell	2

First round
Rockhurst	6
Huntingdon	1
Simon Fraser	3*
Fredonia State	2
Quincy (IL)	4
Houghton (NY)	1
Western New England	4
Campbell	2

Championship semifinals
Rockhurst	0
Simon Fraser	4
Quincy (IL)	3
Western New England	0

Championship
Simon Fraser	0
Quincy (IL)	1
Third place
Rockhurst	2
Western New England	0

== See also ==
- 1975 NCAA Division I soccer tournament
- 1975 NCAA Division II soccer tournament
- 1975 NCAA Division III soccer tournament
