= 1976 NCAA Division I soccer tournament =

1976 College Cup

Tournament details
- Country: United States
- Venue(s): Franklin Field; Philadelphia, Pennsylvania
- Teams: 24

Final positions
- Champions: San Francisco (3rd title)
- Runners-up: Indiana
- Third place: Hartwick College
- Fourth place: Clemson

Tournament statistics
- Matches played: 23
- Goals scored: 84 (3.65 per match)
- Attendance: 39,373 (1,712 per match)
- Top goal scorer(s): (United States) Dave MacWilliams, Philadelphia Textile (5)

Awards
- Best player: (Nigeria) Andy Atuegbu, San Francisco (Offense) (United States) Dave Shelton, Indiana (Defense)

The 1976 NCAA Division I soccer tournament was the 18th annual tournament organized by the National Collegiate Athletic Association to determine the national men's college soccer champion among its Division I members in the United States.

The final match was played at Franklin Field in Philadelphia, Pennsylvania on December 5.

Defending champions San Francisco won their third national title, defeating Indiana in the championship game, 1–0.

== Qualifying ==
No teams made their debut appearances in the NCAA Division I soccer tournament this year.

== Bracket ==
First round
Connecticut	2
Rhode Island	1
Brown	6
Bridgeport	2
Hartwick College	1
Cornell	0
Adelphi	0
St. Francis (NY)	2
Clemson	8
Madison College	0
Howard	3
Maryland	1
Temple	4
Bucknell	0
Philadelphia Textile	4
Penn State	0

Second round
Connecticut	1
Brown	0
Hartwick College	3
St. Francis (NY)	0
Indiana	2
Akron	1
SIU Edwardsville	2
Saint Louis	1
Clemson	3
Howard	1
Temple	0
Philadelphia Textile	4
San Francisco	1
UCLA	0
San Jose State	4
Washington	1

Quarterfinals
Connecticut	1
Hartwick College	2
Indiana	1
SIU Edwardsville	0
Clemson	3
Philadelphia Textile	2
San Francisco	5
San Jose State	0

Semifinals
Hartwick College	1
Indiana	2
Clemson	0
San Francisco	1

Championship
Indiana	0
San Francisco	1
Third place
Hartwick	4
Clemson	3

== Final ==
December 5, 1976

Indiana	0–1	San Francisco

Franklin Field, Philadelphia, Pennsylvania
Attendance: 5,981

== See also ==
- 1976 NCAA Division II Soccer Championship
- 1976 NCAA Division III Soccer Championship
- 1976 NAIA Soccer Championship
