= 1975 NCAA Division III soccer tournament =

1975 NCAA Division III Soccer Championship
Tournament details
- Country: United States
- Teams: 16

Final positions
- Champions: Babson (1st title)
- Runners-up: Brockport

Tournament statistics
- Matches played: 16
- Goals scored: 51 (3.19 per match)
- Top goal scorer(s): Joseph Olivere, Babson (4)

Awards
- Best player: Offense: Wilfrid Thibodeau, Babson; Defense: Jimmy Powers, Babson

The 1974 NCAA Division III Men's Soccer Championship was the second annual tournament held by the NCAA to determine the top men's Division III college soccer program in the United States.

The semifinals and final were played at the State University of New York at Brockport in Brockport, New York.

Babson defeated defending champions and hosts Brockport in the final, 1–0, to claim their first Division III national title.

== Bracket ==
First Round; Campus sites
*	Babson	2
Westfield State	0
*	North Adams State	1
Plymouth State	2
*	Ohio Wesleyan	6
Wheaton (IL)	1
*	MacMurray	2
Lake Forest	1
*	Lynchburg	1
Elizabethtown	2***
*	Lock Haven State	0
Johns Hopkins	2
*	Binghamton	4
Albany (NY)	3
*	NJIT	1
Brockport State	3

Quarterfinals; Campus sites
Babson	2*
Plymouth State	1
Ohio Wesleyan	1
MacMurry	0
Elizabethtown	1
Johns Hopkins	2*
Binghamton	1
Brockport State	2*

Semifinals; Brockport, NY
Babson	5
Ohio Wesleyan	0
Johns Hopkins	1
Brockport State	2*

Final; Brockport, NY
Babson	1
Brockport State	0
Third place
Ohio Wesleyan	1
Johns Hopkins	0

== Final ==
November 30, 1975

Babson	1–0	SUNY Brockport

Brockport, New York
Attendance: 1700

== See also ==
- 1975 NCAA Division I Soccer Tournament
- 1975 NCAA Division II Soccer Championship
- 1975 NAIA Soccer Championship
