= 1967 NAIA soccer championship =

1967 NAIA Soccer Championship

Tournament details
- Country: United States
- Venue(s): Quincy College; Quincy, Illinois
- Teams: 4

Final positions
- Champions: Quincy (IL) (2nd title)
- Runners-up: Rockhurst

Tournament statistics
- Matches played: 4
- Goals scored: 28 (7 per match)

Awards
- Best player: Mike Villa, Quincy (IL)

The 1967 NAIA Soccer Championship was the ninth annual tournament held by the NAIA to determine the national champion of men's college soccer among its members in the United States.

Defending champions and hosts Quincy (IL) defeated Rockhurst in the final, 3–1, to claim the Hawks' second NAIA national title.

The final was played at Quincy College in Quincy, Illinois.

== Bracket ==
First Round
Rockhurst	8
Roberts Wesleyan	2
Quincy (IL)	7
Alderson Broaddus	1

Championship; Quincy, IL
Rockhurst	1
Quincy (IL)	3
Third Place
Roberts Wesleyan	4
Quincy (IL)	2

== See also ==
- 1967 NCAA soccer tournament
