= 2015 NAIA men's soccer season =

NAIA
- Season: 2015

The 2015 NAIA men's soccer season is the 57th season of NAIA Championship college soccer. The regular season began in September, 2015 and concluded on December 5, 2015 with the National Championships, held in Delray Beach, Florida. The defending champions are Davenport (MI).

== Changes from 2014 ==
=== Conference Realignment ===
School	Previous Conference	New Conference

== Season Overview ==
=== Polls ===
Ratings for NAIA as of December 9, 2015

Coaches' Top 25
Rank	Team	Record
1	Rio Grande (OH)	23-1-0
2	MidAmerica Nazarene (KS)	18-6-1
3	Missouri Valley	20-3-1
4	Lindenwood-Belleville (IL)	17-9
5	Davenport (MI)	17-3-2
6	Columbia (MO)	19-4
7	Rocky Mountain (MT)	17-3-4
8	Oklahoma Wesleyan	20-1-1
9	Indiana Wesleyan	16-6-1
10	Biola (CA)	15-5-1
11	Baker (KS)	18-4-1
12	Campbellsville (KY)	18-2-2
13	Union (KY)	17-2-4
14	Vanguard (CA)	16-5
15	Southeastern (FL)	16-5
16	Science & Arts (OK)	19-3
17	Bellevue (NE)	12-4-4
18	Northwestern Ohio	16-5
19	Cumberland (TN)	18-2-1
20	Marymount (CA)	15-4-1
21	Corban (OR)	17-3-1
22	Roosevelt (IL)	16-4-2
23	Lyon (AR)	14-4-1
24	Lindsey Wilson (KY)	14-5-2
25	Hastings (NE)	14-4-3

=== Received Votes ===
The following teams, ranked 26-37, received votes for the Top 25: WVU Tech; Ashford (Iowa); Bethel (Tenn.); The Master's (CA); Thomas (GA); Great Falls (MT); Bryan (TN.); Mobile (AL); UC Merced; Concordia (NE); St. Thomas (TX); Grace (IN.).

== Standings ==
2015 NAIA men's soccer standings as of December 9, 2015

Key to colours in group tables
Team in position to win Conference Title
Team in position to qualify for Conference Playoffs

=== American Midwest Conference ===
AMC						Overall		
Pos	Team	W	L	T	Pct	W	L	T
1	#6 Columbia (C)	11	0	0	1.000	19	4	0
2	#23 Lyon	8	2	1	.773	14	4	1
3	Park	7	3	1	.682	11	4	2
4	#4 Lindenwood-Belleville (T)	7	4	0	.636	17	8	0
5	Hannibal-LaGrange	6	3	2	.636	9	7	3
6	William Woods	5	3	3	.591	9	7	3
7	Harris-Stowe	4	7	0	.364	6	11	2
8	Missouri Baptist	4	7	0	.364	6	12	0
9	Williams Baptist	3	7	1	.318	7	8	1
10	Central Baptist	3	7	1	.318	5	9	2
11	Freed-Hardman	3	7	1	.318	5	9	1
12	St. Louis College of Pharmacy	0	11	0	.000	2	12	1

(C) Conference Champion; (T) Conference Tournament Champion

=== Appalachian Athletic Conference ===
AAC						Overall		
Pos	Team	W	L	T	Pct	W	L	T
1	#RV Bryan (C)	8	0	1	.944	14	5	2
2	#13 Union (T)	7	1	1	.833	17	2	4
3	Reinhardt	7	2	0	.778	10	7	0
4	Tennessee Wesleyan	5	3	1	.611	8	9	1
5	St. Andrews	4	5	0	..444	9	8	1
6	Truett-McConnell	3	4	2	..444	10	6	3
7	Milligan	3	5	1	..389	4	12	2
8	Point	2	7	0	.222	5	11	1
9	Montreat	1	6	2	.222	8	8	2
10	Bluefield	1	8	0	.111	6	11	2

(C) Conference Champion; (T) Conference Tournament Champion

=== California Pacific Conference ===
Cal-Pac North						Overall		
Pos	Team	W	L	T	Pct	W	L	T
1	#RV UC Merced	8	3	0	.727	13	5	1
2	Simpson	3	7	1	.318	4	13	1
3	Pacific Union	1	8	2	.182	2	13	2
4	Cal Maritime	1	10	0	.091	1	13	0
5	Sierra Nevada	0	0	0	.000	4	12	0

Cal-Pac South						Overall		
Pos	Team	W	L	T	Pct	W	L	T
1	#20 Marymount (C)(T)	11	1	0	.917	15	4	1
2	Antelope Valley	9	2	1	.792	12	5	1
3	Embry-Riddle	7	5	0	.583	11	8	0
4	La Sierra	6	4	2	.583	9	6	2
5	Soka	3	9	0	.250	6	11	0
6	Providence Christian	0	0	0	.000	0	12	0

(C) Conference Champion; (T) Conference Tournament Champion

-Antelope Valley where not allowed a play-off bid due to first year eligibility.

=== Cascade Collegiate Conference ===
CCC						Overall		
Pos	Team	W	L	T	Pct	W	L	T
1	#7 Rocky Mountain (C)(T)	11	1	1	.885	17	3	4
2	#21 Corban	11	2	0	.846	17	3	1
3	#RV Great Falls	10	3	0	.769	13	7	1
4	Evergreen	9	3	1	.731	13	3	2
5	Carroll	8	3	2	.692	11	6	2
6	Warner Pacific	8	4	1	.654	10	8	1
7	Northwest	8	5	0	.615	10	9	0
8	College of Idaho	6	7	0	.462	7	8	0
9	Southern Oregon	5	8	0	.385	10	8	0
10	Eastern Oregon	5	8	0	.385	7	9	0
11	Oregon Tech	4	8	1	.346	6	10	1
12	Northwest Christian	2	11	0	.154	3	14	1
13	Multnomah	1	12	0	.077	1	16	0
14	Walla Walla	0	13	0	.000	0	15	0

(C) Conference Champion; (T) Conference Tournament Champion

=== Chicagoland Collegiate Athletic Conference ===
CCAC						Overall		
Pos	Team	W	L	T	Pct	W	L	T
1	#22 Roosevelt (C)(T)	12	0	1	.962	16	4	2
2	Purdue Calumet	8	3	1	.708	12	5	2
3	Olivet Nazarene	8	4	0	.667	12	5	2
4	Saint Xavier	8	4	0	.667	13	8	0
5	Holy Cross	7	5	1	.577	11	7	2
6	Cardinal Stritch	7	5	0	.583	9	8	1
7	Calumet St. Joseph	6	5	1	.542	9	8	2
8	St. Ambrose	6	5	1	.542	9	10	1
9	Trinity International	5	6	1	.458	10	8	1
10								
11								
12								
13								

(C) Conference Champion; (T) Conference Tournament Champion
