= 1975 NCAA Division I soccer tournament =

1975 College Cup

Tournament details
- Country: United States
- Venue(s): Ralph Korte Stadium; Edwardsville, Illinois
- Teams: 24

Final positions
- Champions: San Francisco (2nd title)
- Runners-up: SIU Edwardsville
- Third place: Brown
- Fourth place: Howard

Tournament statistics
- Matches played: 23
- Goals scored: 91 (3.96 per match)
- Attendance: 24,071 (1,047 per match)
- Top goal scorer(s): Lincoln Peddie, Howard (6)

Awards
- Best player: (Nigeria) Andy Atuegbu, San Francisco (offensive) (Socialist Federal Republic of Yugoslavia) Steve Ralbovsky, Brown (defensive)

The 1975 NCAA Division I soccer tournament was the 17th annual tournament organized by the National Collegiate Athletic Association to determine the national men's college soccer champion among its Division I members in the United States.

The final match was played at Ralph Korte Stadium in Edwardsville, Illinois on December 7.

San Francisco won their second national title by defeating SIU Edwardsville in the championship game, 4–0.

== Qualifying ==
Three teams made their debut appearances in the NCAA Division I soccer tournament: Appalachian State, Cal State Fullerton, and Vermont.

== Bracket ==
First round
Connecticut (OT)	4
Vermont	3
Brown	3
Bridgeport	2
Cornell	1
Oneonta State	0
Hartwick College	2
Army	1
Howard	3
Appalachian State	1
Clemson	3
South Florida	1
Philadelphia Textile	4
Penn State	3
Fairleigh Dickinson	1*
Bucknell	0

Second round
Connecticut	2
Brown	4
Cornell	2
Hartwick College	1
San Francisco	4
UCLA	1
Cal State Fullerton	1
Colorado College	0
Howard	3
Clemson	1
Philadelphia Textile	5
Fairleigh Dickinson	0
SIU Edwardsville	3
Cleveland State	2
Saint Louis	2
Akron	1

Quarterfinals
Brown	3
Cornell	0
San Francisco	3
Cal State Fullerton	2
Howard	2
Philadelphia Textile	1
SIU Edwardsville	2
Saint Louis	1

Semifinals
Brown	1
San Francisco (3OT)	2
Howard	1
SIU Edwardsville	3

Championship
San Francisco	4
SIU Edwardsville	0

== Championship Rounds ==
=== Third-Place Final ===
Brown	2–0	Howard

=== Final ===
December 7, 1975

San Francisco	4–0	SIU Edwardsville

Cougar Field, Edwardsville, Illinois
Attendance: 4,400

== See also ==
- 1975 NCAA Division II Soccer Championship
- 1975 NCAA Division III Soccer Championship
- 1975 NAIA Soccer Championship
