= 1960 NAIA soccer championship =

1960 NAIA Soccer Championship

Tournament details
- Country: United States
- Teams: 4

Final positions
- Champions: Elizabethtown (1); Newark Engineering (1)
- Runners-up: N/A

Tournament statistics
- Matches played: 4
- Goals scored: 19 (4.75 per match)

Awards
- Best player: Elwood Kerkeslager, Elizabethtown

The 1960 NAIA Soccer Championship was the second annual tournament held by the NAIA to determine the national champion of men's college soccer among its members in the United States.

Elizabethtown and Newark Engineering (now NJIT) played to a 2–2 tie (called due to darkness after four overtime periods) and shared the NAIA national title; it was the first championship for either the Blue Jays or the Highlanders. The final was played at Slippery Rock State College in Slippery Rock, Pennsylvania.

== Bracket ==
First Round
Elizabethtown	8
Tabor	0
Newark Engineering	3**
Fitchburg State	2

Championship; Slippery Rock, PA
Elizabethtown	2****
Newark Engineering	2
Third Place
Tabor	2
Fitchburg State	0

== See also ==
- 1960 NCAA soccer tournament
