= 1976 NCAA Division II soccer tournament =

1976 NCAA Division II Soccer Championship
Tournament details
- Country: United States
- Teams: 16

Final positions
- Champions: Loyola (MD) (1st title)
- Runners-up: New Haven (1st title game)
- Third place: Chico State

Tournament statistics
- Matches played: 16
- Goals scored: 54 (3.38 per match)

The 1976 NCAA Division II Soccer Championship was the fifth annual tournament held by the NCAA to determine the top men's Division II college soccer program in the United States.

Loyola (MD) defeated New Haven in the final match, 2–0, to win their first national title. The final was played at Memorial Stadium in Seattle, Washington on November 27, 1976.

== Bracket ==
First Round; *Campus sites
Hartford	1
Southern Connecticut	4
New Haven	4
C.W. Post	0
Oakland	1
UMSL	5
Western Illinois	2
UW–Green Bay	0
Loyola (MD)	5
Randolph–Macon	2
Rollins	2
Baltimore	0
UC Davis	1
Cal State Hayward	0
Seattle Pacific	2
Chico State	3(4OT)

Quarterfinals; *Campus sites
Southern Connecticut	0
New Haven	1(4OT)
UMSL	2(OT)
Western Illinois	1
Loyola (MD)	1
Rollins	0
UC Davis	1
Chico State	2(2OT)

Semifinals
New Haven	2(2OT)
UMSL	1
Loyola (MD)	3
Chico State	2

Final; November 27, 1976; Seattle, WA
New Haven	0
Loyola (MD)	2
Third place
UM–Saint Louis	2(2)
Chico State	2(4)

== Final ==
November 27, 1976

New Haven	0–2	Loyola (MD)
	Report	Ian Reid 42:10' (Chelminiak); Pete Notaro 72:30' (Chelminiak)

Memorial Stadium, Seattle, Washington
Attendance: 3,000

== See also ==
- 1976 NCAA Division I Soccer Tournament
- 1976 NCAA Division III Soccer Championship
- 1976 NAIA Soccer Championship
