= 1981 NCAA Division II soccer tournament =

1981 NCAA Division II Soccer Championship
Tournament details
- Country: United States
- Teams: 10

Final positions
- Champions: Tampa (1st title)
- Runners-up: Cal State Los Angeles
- Third place: So. Conn. State

Tournament statistics
- Matches played: 10
- Goals scored: 24 (2.4 per match)
- Top goal scorer(s): Ron Basile, SCSC (3)

The 1981 NCAA Division II Soccer Championship was the tenth annual tournament held by the NCAA to determine the top men's Division II college soccer program in the United States. This was the final Division II tournament to feature a third-place match.

Tampa defeated Cal State Los Angeles in the final, 1–0 (after one overtime period), to win their first Division II national title. The Spartans (14-0-3) were coached by Jay Miller.

The semifinals and final were played at the Soccer-Lacrosse Stadium on the campus of Yale University in New Haven, Connecticut.

== Bracket ==
First Round; *Campus sites
Seattle Pacific	2
*	Chico State	3
New Haven (OT)	2(OT)
*	Hartford	1

Quarterfinals; *Campus sites
UMSL	1
*	Lock Haven State	0
*	Tampa	1
Rollins	0
Cal State Los Angeles	2
*	Chico State	1
Southern Connecticut	1
*	New Haven	0

Semifinals; New Haven, CT
UMSL	0
Tampa	2
Cal State Los Angeles	3
Southern Connecticut	0

Final; November 28, 1981; New Haven, CT
Tampa	1(OT)
Cal State Los Angeles	0
Third place
UMSL	1
Southern Connecticut	3

== Final ==
November 28, 1981

Tampa	1–0 (OT)	Cal State Los Angeles
Peter Johansson 92:29'	Report 1 Report 2

Soccer-Lacrosse Stadium, New Haven, Connecticut
Attendance: 700

== See also ==
- 1981 NCAA Division I soccer tournament
- 1981 NCAA Division III soccer tournament
- 1981 NAIA soccer championship
