= 1960 Saint Louis Billikens men's soccer team =

American college soccer season

1960 Saint Louis Billikens men's soccer
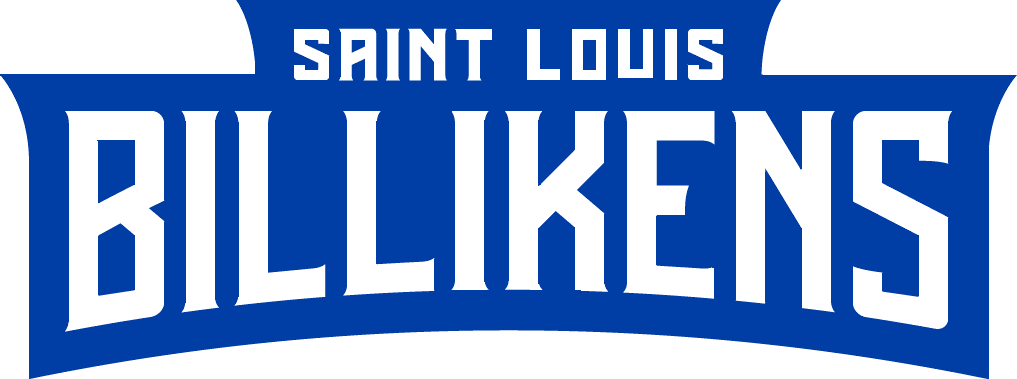

National Champions

NCAA Tournament, W 3–2 vs. Maryland
- Conference: Independent
- Record: 13–1–0
- Head coach: Bob Guelker (3rd season)

The 1960 Saint Louis Billikens men's soccer team represented Saint Louis University during the 1960 NCAA Division I men's soccer season. The Billikens won their second NCAA title this season. It was the third-ever season the Billikens fielded a men's varsity soccer team.

== Schedule ==
Date Time, TV	Rank^{#}	Opponent^{#}	Result	Record	Site City, State
Regular season
09-17-1960*		at Fairleigh Dickinson	L 2–3	0–1–0	Madison, NJ
09-24-1960*		Wheaton	W 4–0	1–1–0	St. Louis, MO
10-01-1960*		at Illinois	W 3–0	2–1–0	Champaign, IL
10-08-1960*		Indiana	W 12–0	3–1–0	St. Louis, MO
10-11-1960*		Washington University	W 5–0	4–1–0	St. Louis, MO
10-15-1960*		at Michigan State	W 4–0	5–1–0	East Lansing, MI
10-22-1960*		Pittsburgh	W 4–0	6–1–0	St. Louis, MO
10-28-1960*		at Air Force	W 3–1	7–1–0	Colorado Springs, CO
11-05-1960*		at Navy Pier	W 2–0	8–1–0	Streeterville, IL
11-06-1960*		at Chicago	W 10–0	9–1–0	Chicago, IL
11-12-1960*		Purdue	W 12–0	10–1–0	St. Louis, MO
11-18-1960*		Akron	W 5–3	11–1–0	St. Louis, MO
NCAA Tournament
11-21-1960*		California; First Round	W 2–0	12–1–0	St. Louis, MO
11-25-1960*		vs. West Chester; Semifinals	W 2–1	13–1–0	Brooklyn, NY
11-26-1960*		vs. Maryland; Final	W 3–2	14–1–0	Brooklyn, NY
*Non-conference game. ^{#}Rankings from United Soccer Coaches. (#) Tournament seedings in parentheses.
