= 1959 NCAA soccer tournament =

Tournament details
- Country: United States
- Venue(s): Memorial Stadium; Storrs, Connecticut
- Teams: 8

Final positions
- Champions: Saint Louis (1st title)
- Runners-up: Bridgeport
- Semifinalists: CCNY; West Chester State

Tournament statistics
- Matches played: 7
- Goals scored: 22 (3.14 per match)

The 1959 NCAA soccer tournament was the inaugural tournament organized by the National Collegiate Athletic Association to determine the national champion of men's college soccer among its members in the United States.

The inaugural championship was played on November 28 at Memorial Stadium at the University of Connecticut in Storrs.

Saint Louis defeated Bridgeport in the final, 2–0, to claim the inaugural title.

== Qualifying ==
Qualified teams
School	Record	Appearance	Last Bid
Bridgeport	9–0	1st	Never
CCNY	8–1–1	1st	Never
Colgate	7–1	1st	Never
Maryland	8–0	1st	Never
Saint Louis	8–1	1st	Never
San Francisco	8–1	1st	Never
West Chester State	8–0–1	1st	Never
Williams	6–0–2	1st	Never

== Bracket ==
First round
Saint Louis	4
San Francisco	0
CCNY	1
Williams	0
Bridgeport (2OT)	3
Colgate	2
West Chester State	1
Maryland	0

Semifinals
Saint Louis	6
CCNY	2
Bridgeport (10OT)	2
West Chester State	1

Final; Memorial Stadium; Storrs, CT
Saint Louis	5
Bridgeport	2

== See also ==
- 1959 NAIA Soccer Championship
- 1959 Saint Louis Billikens men's soccer team
