= Quincy Hawks =

- University: Quincy University
- Nickname: Hawks
- NCAA: Division II; Division I (men's volleyball)
- Conference: GLVC; MSFL (sprint football)
- Athletic director: Josh Rabe
- Location: Quincy, Illinois
- Varsity teams: 28
- Football stadium: QU Stadium
- Basketball arena: Pepsi Arena
- Baseball stadium: QU Stadium
- Softball stadium: Mart Heinen Softball Complex
- Soccer stadium: Legends Stadium
- Colors: Brown, white, and gold
- Mascot: Victor E. Hawk
- Website: quhawks.com

The Quincy Hawks are the athletic teams that represent Quincy University, located in Quincy, Illinois, in intercollegiate athletics. Quincy is a member of NCAA Division II and has been a member of the Great Lakes Valley Conference (GLVC) since 1994. The Hawks compete in the GLVC in all but two sports. Sprint football, a weight-restricted form of American football governed outside the NCAA structure, competes in the Midwest Sprint Football League, while men's bowling competes as an independent.

Men's volleyball competed in the Midwestern Intercollegiate Volleyball Association (MIVA) for more than 30 seasons before joining the GLVC when the conference began sponsoring men's volleyball during the 2025–26 academic year. The NCAA does not currently sponsor a separate Division II championship in men's volleyball; Division I and Division II programs instead compete for the NCAA National Collegiate Men's Volleyball Championship.

Quincy currently sponsors 28 varsity sports. Women's lacrosse was added in 2017 and men's lacrosse in 2018, bringing the university to 23 varsity programs. Sprint football became Quincy's 24th varsity sport in 2022, with the Hawks becoming a charter member of the Midwest Sprint Football League. Men's and women's wrestling also began competition during the 2022–23 academic year. STUNT was added as the university's 27th varsity sport and began competition in 2025.

In May 2026, Quincy announced that women's flag football would be added beginning with the 2027–28 academic year. The program will become the university's 29th varsity sport and 15th women's sport.

== Varsity teams ==
Men's sports	Women's sports
Baseball	Basketball
Basketball	Bowling
Bowling	Competitive dance
Cross country	Cross country
Football	Golf
Golf	Lacrosse
Lacrosse	Soccer
Soccer	Softball
Sprint football	STUNT
Swimming	Swimming
Tennis	Tennis
Track and field	Track and field
Volleyball	Volleyball
Wrestling	Wrestling

Quincy University announced in May 2026 that it would add women's flag football as its 29th varsity sport, with competition scheduled to begin during the 2027–28 academic year.

== National championships ==
=== Team ===
Association	Division	Sport	Year	Opponent/Runner-up	Score
Men's Soccer (11)	NAIA (11)	Single (11)	1966	Trenton State	6–1
Men's Soccer (11)	NAIA (11)	Single (11)	1967	Rockhurst	3–1
Men's Soccer (11)	NAIA (11)	Single (11)	1971	Davis & Elkins	1–0
Men's Soccer (11)	NAIA (11)	Single (11)	1973	Rockhurst	3–0
Men's Soccer (11)	NAIA (11)	Single (11)	1974	Davis & Elkins	6–0
Men's Soccer (11)	NAIA (11)	Single (11)	1975	Simon Fraser	1–0
Men's Soccer (11)	NAIA (11)	Single (11)	1977	Keene State	3–0
Men's Soccer (11)	NAIA (11)	Single (11)	1978	Alabama–Huntsville	2–0
Men's Soccer (11)	NAIA (11)	Single (11)	1979	Rockhurst	1–0
Men's Soccer (11)	NAIA (11)	Single (11)	1980	Simon Fraser	1–0
Men's Soccer (11)	NAIA (11)	Single (11)	1981	Alderson Broaddus	4–1
Softball (1)	NAIA (1)	Single (1)	1985	Washburn	4–2

=== Individual ===
Athlete	Sport	Association	Event/Weight class	Year
Jalon White	Men's track and field	NCAA Division II	Indoor 400 meters	2021
Xochitl Mota-Pettis	Women's wrestling	NCAA	124 pounds	2026

== Individual sports ==
=== Baseball ===
Baseball has been played at Quincy since at least the 1940s. Independent baseball records date the Quincy College program to 1945, and future Major League Baseball player and coach El Tappe played baseball at Quincy College during the decade. Quincy's current season-by-season athletic records date back to 1958.

Quincy began competing in the Great Lakes Valley Conference in 1996 and earned its first NCAA Division II Tournament berth the following season. The Hawks have won five GLVC Tournament championships, capturing titles in 2000, 2011, 2017, 2018 and 2023. The 2000 championship was the first GLVC championship won by Quincy in any sport.

The Hawks won the NCAA Midwest Regional and advanced to the NCAA Division II Baseball Championship finals for the first time in 2017. Quincy went 0–2 at the eight-team championship in Grand Prairie, Texas, finishing the season 37–23.

Quincy advanced to NCAA Super Regional play in both 2022 and 2023. The 2023 Hawks finished 47–11, won both the GLVC regular-season and tournament championships and made the program's 12th NCAA Tournament appearance. The team hit 131 home runs during the season, tying the NCAA Division II single-season record.

Five former Quincy baseball players have reached Major League Baseball: El Tappe, Jim Finigan, Josh Kinney, Josh Rabe and Riley Martin. Tappe was the first former Hawk to reach the majors, debuting in 1954, while Martin became the fifth when he made his MLB debut in 2026.

=== Basketball ===
Men's Basketball

The Quincy men's basketball program began competition during the 1940–41 season. The Hawks made their first national tournament appearance in 1955 under head coach Harry Forrester. Quincy defeated St. Francis (N.Y.) 84–82 in the opening round of the NAIA national tournament before falling to Alderson-Broaddus 88–84 in the second round. The 1954–55 team finished 17–9 and was the first athletic team in Quincy history to qualify for a national competition. Quincy later returned to the NAIA national tournament in 1958, 1964 and 1967.

Quincy made its first NCAA Division II Tournament appearance in 1994 and returned in 1995 and 1997. The Hawks later made five NCAA Tournament appearances under head coach Marty Bell, in 2005, 2006, 2007, 2010 and 2017.

The program's deepest NCAA Tournament run came in 2010, when Quincy advanced to the Midwest Regional championship game and the NCAA Sweet Sixteen. The Hawks fell to Saint Joseph's College in triple overtime, narrowly missing the program's first NCAA Elite Eight appearance. Quincy has also won GLVC divisional regular-season championships, including the West Division title in 2017, when the Hawks finished 25–7 and advanced to the second round of the NCAA Tournament.

Women's Basketball

The Quincy women's basketball program began competition during the 1965–66 season. The program became a consistent NCAA Division II postseason participant during the 2000s, making its first NCAA Tournament appearance in 2003 and advancing to the Sweet Sixteen.

The Hawks produced their most successful NCAA postseason run in 2004. Quincy finished 29–5, won both the GLVC regular-season and tournament championships and captured the NCAA Great Lakes Regional championship to advance to the NCAA Division II Elite Eight. The Hawks were eliminated by Henderson State by one point in the national quarterfinals. Quincy repeated as both GLVC regular-season and tournament champion in 2005 and again advanced to the NCAA Sweet Sixteen.

Quincy returned to the NCAA Tournament several times over the following decade, including appearances in 2006, 2008, 2009, 2011, 2012, 2014 and 2016.

In 2025, Quincy won its third GLVC Tournament championship and its first since 2005, defeating Maryville 64–60 in the championship game. The victory gave the Hawks an automatic berth in the NCAA Division II Tournament, marking the program's 11th NCAA Tournament appearance and its first since 2016.

=== Bowling ===
Men's Bowling

Quincy previously sponsored men's bowling during its NAIA era. The 1966 team finished as the national runner-up at the NAIA National Bowling Tournament in Kansas City, Missouri. Quincy finished the tournament with a 10–5 record and 15,589 total pins, while John Kolodziej finished as the tournament's second-highest individual scorer.

Quincy reinstated men's bowling beginning with the 2020–21 academic year after announcing the return of the sport in 2019. Unlike women's bowling, men's collegiate bowling is not sponsored by the NCAA, and Quincy competes in events sanctioned through the United States Bowling Congress collegiate system.

The modern men's program recorded its most successful season to date in 2025–26. Quincy won the Mid-States Championship for the first tournament title in program history and earned its first ranking in the National Collegiate Bowling Coaches Association poll, reaching No. 16 nationally. The Hawks later finished fifth at the 2026 USBC sectional qualifier, their best finish in program history, narrowly missing qualification for the Intercollegiate Team Championships.

Women's Bowling

Quincy announced the addition of women's bowling in 2019, with competition beginning during the 2020–21 academic year. The program joined the Great Lakes Valley Conference for women's bowling in its inaugural season.

Women's bowling is an NCAA championship sport in which programs from all three NCAA divisions compete for a single national championship. Quincy has competed in each GLVC Women's Bowling Championship since beginning varsity competition and hosted the conference championship at Casino Lanes in Quincy in 2025.

=== Competitive Dance ===
The Quincy dance team, known as the Hawkettes, existed as a campus performance team before competitive dance was established as a varsity program. The Hawkettes entered their first competitive event in April 2024, competing at the Dance Team Union College Classic National Championships in Orlando, Florida, in preparation for Quincy's inaugural competitive dance season during the 2024–25 academic year.

At the 2024 College Classic, Quincy competed in the Division II pom, jazz and hip-hop divisions, placing 14th in pom, ninth in jazz and fourth in hip-hop. The Hawkettes returned to the College Classic National Championships in 2025, again competing in Division II pom, jazz and hip-hop.

=== Cross Country ===
Men's Cross Country

Quincy restored its men's and women's cross country programs in 2010 after a period in which the university did not sponsor varsity cross country. The men's team earned its first meet victory following the restoration of the program in 2013, winning the Sauk Valley Invitational. Mike Crotteau won the individual race with a time of 29:23.

Women's Cross Country

The women's cross country program was also restored in 2010. The Hawks earned their first meet championship since the program's restoration in 2013, winning the Scarlet and Blue Scramble hosted by Hannibal–LaGrange University.

In 2025, Quincy placed ninth at the Great Lakes Valley Conference Championship, the highest team finish in program history. The Hawks went on to compete at the NCAA Division II Midwest Regional, placing 25th among 27 scoring teams.

=== Football ===
Quincy's football program first competed in 1916. The program competed intermittently during its early history before being discontinued following the 1953 season. Football was reinstated at Quincy in 1986.

The Hawks joined the Illini–Badger Football Conference in 1993 and went 9–0 under first-year head coach Ron Taylor, winning the conference championship and completing the program's first undefeated season since football was reinstated. Quincy was ranked No. 1 in the final NCAA Division II Non-Scholarship Football Poll released by Don Hansen's National College Football Weekly Gazette. The Hawks repeated as Illini–Badger champions in 1994, finishing 8–1 and defeating Eureka 34–33 in the conference championship game.

Quincy began competing in the Mid-States Football Association in 2003 and remained in the league through the 2011 season. The Hawks became a football member of the Great Lakes Valley Conference in 2012, the first season in which the GLVC sponsored football.

=== Golf ===
Men's Golf

The Quincy men's golf program competes in NCAA Division II as a member of the Great Lakes Valley Conference. Quincy finished third at the 1999–2000 GLVC Championship, recording a three-round team score of 911. Dan Citro led the Hawks with a score of 227.

In 2026, freshman David Gartrell became the first Quincy men's golfer to be named GLVC Player of the Week. Gartrell earned the honor after finishing third at the Las Vegas Warrior Invitational with a three-round score of 214, two under par.

Women's Golf

The Quincy women's golf program also competes in NCAA Division II and the Great Lakes Valley Conference. GLVC championship records document Quincy competing in the conference championship by at least the 1998–99 season.

In 2026, Lily Vardaman became the first women's golfer in Quincy program history to qualify for an NCAA regional as an individual. Vardaman was selected as one of six individual competitors for the NCAA Division II East Regional at Findlay Country Club in Findlay, Ohio. She completed the three-round regional with scores of 78, 81 and 83.

=== Lacrosse ===
Men's lacrosse

Quincy announced the addition of men's lacrosse in March 2018, with the program beginning varsity competition during the 2019–20 academic year as a member of the Great Lakes Valley Conference. The Hawks played their inaugural season in spring 2020, finishing 0–5 before the remainder of the season was canceled during the COVID-19 pandemic.

Quincy earned the first victory in program history on February 13, 2022, defeating Wheeling 13–3. Jordan Ernst scored six goals in the victory, setting a program single-game record at the time.

The Hawks recorded their first GLVC victory on April 26, 2025, defeating William Jewell 8–7 at QU Stadium. Quincy finished the 2025 conference season 1–4, placing fifth in the GLVC standings.

Women's lacrosse

Quincy first announced plans to add women's lacrosse in 2014. The university later announced in 2018 that both its men's and women's programs would begin competition during the 2019–20 academic year. The Hawks played their first game on February 15, 2020, against Davenport and earned the first victory in program history six days later with an 18–7 win over Upper Iowa.

Quincy reached the GLVC Championship Tournament for the first time in 2024 after finishing the regular season 8–10 overall and 3–4 in conference play. The eight victories established a program single-season record, which the Hawks matched again in 2025.

Goalkeeper Kelly McClure became the first Quincy women's lacrosse player to earn GLVC Goalkeeper of the Year honors in 2024. McClure finished second in the conference in save percentage during GLVC play and was one of six Quincy players to earn All-GLVC recognition that season.

=== Soccer ===
Men's soccer

The Quincy men's soccer program began competition in 1964. The Hawks won the NAIA men's soccer championship a record eleven times, capturing national titles in 1966, 1967, 1971, 1973–1975 and 1977–1981. Quincy also finished as the national runner-up in 1968 and 1970. The five consecutive championships from 1977 through 1981 remain a record for NAIA men's soccer.

Quincy moved from the NAIA to NCAA Division I in 1984. From 1987 through 1990, the Hawks competed in the Big Central Soccer Conference, earning a share of the regular-season championship in 1987 before winning both the regular-season and tournament championships in 1988. Quincy competed as an associate member of the Mid-Continent Conference in 1994 and 1995 before moving to NCAA Division II and joining the Great Lakes Valley Conference for men's soccer in 1996.

The Hawks made their first NCAA Division II Tournament appearance in 1998. Quincy won the GLVC Tournament championship in 2011 and captured consecutive GLVC regular-season championships in 2013 and 2014. The 2014 team finished 21–2–2 and advanced to the NCAA Division II national semifinals, where the Hawks fell to eventual national champion Lynn.

Women's soccer

The Quincy women's soccer program began competition in 1983. The Hawks made an NAIA Tournament appearance in 1985 before later transitioning to NCAA competition. Quincy reached the NCAA Division II national semifinals in consecutive seasons in 1994 and 1995.

Quincy won consecutive GLVC regular-season and tournament championships in 2012 and 2013. The 2013 Hawks went 18–1–4 and advanced to the third round of the NCAA Division II Tournament. Quincy added another GLVC regular-season championship in 2017 and again reached the third round of the NCAA Tournament.

=== Softball ===
The Quincy softball program began competition in 1973. The Hawks finished as the NAIA national runner-up in 1984 after posting a 41–11 record. The following season, Quincy went 40–7 and won the 1985 NAIA national championship, defeating Washburn 4–2 in the championship game. The title made softball the first women's athletic program at Quincy to win a national championship.

Quincy began competing in the Great Lakes Valley Conference in 1996 following the university's transition to NCAA Division II competition. The Hawks later earned consecutive NCAA Division II Tournament appearances in 2010 and 2011.

=== Sprint football ===
Quincy announced the addition of sprint football in June 2021 as a charter member of the newly formed Midwest Sprint Football League (MSFL), with the program beginning competition in fall 2022. Sprint football is a weight-restricted form of American football that is governed outside of the NCAA and NAIA structures.

The Hawks played their first game on September 17, 2022, defeating fellow charter member Fontbonne 7–0 in St. Louis. Taylor Klusmeyer scored the first touchdown in program history on a two-yard run in the first quarter. Quincy finished its inaugural season with a 4–3 record after winning its final three games. Linebacker Ray Lingard was named the inaugural MSFL Defensive Player of the Year after leading Quincy with 72 tackles, 16 tackles for loss and 6.5 sacks.

Quincy posted a program-best 5–3 record during its second season in 2023. The Hawks won five of their final six regular-season games, including a 28–18 victory over previously unbeaten Bellarmine in the regular-season finale, and advanced to the MSFL semifinals. Quincy fell to Saint Mary-of-the-Woods 23–13 in the semifinal.

=== STUNT ===
Quincy announced the addition of STUNT in June 2023 as the university's 27th varsity sport and 13th women's varsity program, with competition beginning during the 2024–25 academic year. STUNT is a competitive, cheer-based sport in which opposing teams perform identical routines involving partner stunts, pyramids and tosses, jumps and tumbling, and team routines.

Quincy played the first STUNT game in program history on February 15, 2025, against Concordia University Chicago at the Crossroads Rumble in Notre Dame, Indiana. The Hawks earned their first victory on March 28, defeating Northern Kentucky 12–4 at the Music City Classic in Nashville, Tennessee. Quincy finished its inaugural season with a 2–14 record.

The Great Lakes Valley Conference began sponsoring STUNT as its 26th championship sport during the 2025–26 academic year, with Quincy among the league's participating programs. During Quincy's second season in 2026, the Hawks improved to 6–9 during the regular season and qualified for the inaugural GLVC STUNT Championship as the No. 7 seed.

Head coach Diane Shoemaker was named the inaugural GLVC Coach of the Year in 2026, while five Quincy athletes earned honorable mention All-GLVC recognition.

STUNT was part of the NCAA Emerging Sports for Women program when Quincy began competition. In January 2026, all three NCAA divisions approved STUNT as an NCAA championship sport, with the inaugural National Collegiate STUNT Championship scheduled for spring 2027.

=== Swimming ===
Men's Swimming

Quincy established its men's swimming program for the 2022–23 academic year, marking the first varsity men's swimming team in university history. The Hawks began competition in the Great Lakes Valley Conference alongside the university's relaunched women's program.

Wyatt Walsh became the first Quincy swimmer to compete at the NCAA Division II Men's Swimming and Diving Championships in 2024. Walsh qualified in the 400-yard individual medley and finished 17th nationally, missing a place in the consolation final by 0.23 seconds.

In 2025, Walsh and Borna Kisasondi became Quincy's first swimming All-Americans. Walsh placed sixth nationally in the 400-yard individual medley with a program-record time of 3:51.48, becoming the first Quincy swimmer to reach an NCAA championship final and earn first-team All-America honors. Kisasondi placed 16th in the 100-yard butterfly to earn second-team All-America honors. Quincy finished 29th in the team standings at the NCAA Division II Championships with 16 points.

The men's program recorded its highest GLVC Championship finish in 2026, placing fifth. Later that season, Walsh earned his second consecutive All-America honor with a 10th-place finish in the 400-yard individual medley, while freshman Haniel Kudwoli placed 16th in the 100-yard breaststroke to earn second-team All-America recognition.

Women's Swimming

Quincy announced the addition of women's swimming in 2014, with the program beginning varsity competition during the 2015–16 academic year. Quincy became the ninth GLVC institution to sponsor women's swimming and finished eighth at the conference championship during its inaugural season.

The Hawks improved to sixth at the 2017 GLVC Championship, scoring 225 points after scoring 145.5 during their inaugural conference meet. Sydney Zimdars and Eboni McCray each recorded NCAA provisional qualifying standards during the championship.

After two seasons of competition, the women's program became inactive before being relaunched for the 2022–23 academic year alongside the newly established men's program. In 2026, Quincy placed eighth at the GLVC Championship, its best conference finish since the program was relaunched.

=== Tennis ===
Men's Tennis

Quincy has sponsored men's tennis since at least the 1970s. Mark Schuering, who competed for Quincy College during the decade, won the NAIA District 20 singles championship four times and qualified for the NAIA National Tournament in each of his four collegiate seasons.

Quincy's current season-by-season men's tennis records date to the 1998–99 season. The Hawks qualified for three consecutive Great Lakes Valley Conference Championship Tournaments from 2002 through 2004 and returned in consecutive seasons in 2015 and 2016.

In 2025, Quincy won 13 matches, setting a program record for victories in a season and surpassing the previous mark of 12 established by the 2002–03 team. The Hawks qualified for the GLVC Championship Tournament in 2024, 2025 and 2026, with the 2026 appearance marking the 13th conference tournament berth in program history.

Women's Tennis

Quincy's women's tennis program dates to at least 1964, when Ann Bergman began a 22-year tenure as head coach. Bergman compiled a 95–57–4 dual-match record from 1964 through 1985 and guided Quincy to the NAIA National Tournament in 1983 and 1984. Quincy won the NAIA District 20 championship in 1983, and Bergman was named the district's Coach of the Year in 1984.

The 1984–85 Quincy women's tennis team completed an undefeated 11–0 regular season and won the NAIA District 20 championship. All three Quincy doubles teams won district championships, while Sharon Kluba and Julie Fischer won individual singles titles. No. 1 singles player Laura Gabriel completed her two-year Quincy career with a 65–9 combined singles and doubles record. The 1984–85 team was inducted into the Quincy University Sports Hall of Fame in 2023.

In the NCAA Division II era, Quincy has been a regular participant in the GLVC postseason. The Hawks made their 13th GLVC Championship Tournament appearance in 2024 and their third appearance in a four-year span.

=== Track and field ===
Men's Track and Field

Quincy's current men's and women's track and field programs began competition during the 2015–16 academic year. Both teams completed their inaugural outdoor seasons at the 2016 Great Lakes Valley Conference Outdoor Track and Field Championships.

The men's program produced the first individual national champion in Quincy University history in 2021. Jalon White won the 400-meter dash at the NCAA Division II Indoor Track and Field Championships in Birmingham, Alabama, with a time of 47.36 seconds. White's victory made him the first Quincy athlete in any sport to win an individual national championship.

At the same 2021 national championship, Antonio Laidler finished seventh in the 60-meter dash with a time of 6.89 seconds, becoming the first track and field athlete in Quincy history to earn All-America honors. White and Laidler were also the first Quincy track and field athletes to qualify for the NCAA Division II Indoor Championships.

Herman Chongwain became Quincy's first athlete to qualify for the NCAA Division II Outdoor Track and Field Championships in 2022. Chongwain qualified in the 100-meter dash with a school-record time of 10.35 seconds and finished 16th in the national preliminary round.

In 2026, Jack Thompson became the next Quincy men's athlete to earn NCAA All-America honors. Thompson placed 12th in the triple jump at the NCAA Division II Indoor Championships to earn second-team All-America recognition before placing 15th in the long jump at the outdoor national championships for his second All-America honor of the season.

Women's Track and Field

Quincy's current women's track and field program also began competition during the 2015–16 academic year, competing in both indoor and outdoor seasons and making its first GLVC championship appearances that year.

Katie Park became the first Quincy women's track and field athlete to win an individual GLVC outdoor championship in 2026. Park won the 1,500-meter run in 4:34.70 at the GLVC Outdoor Championships in Bolivar, Missouri, setting a Quincy school record and earning All-GLVC honors.

=== Volleyball ===
Men's Volleyball

The Quincy men's volleyball program began competition in 1994 and joined the Midwestern Intercollegiate Volleyball Association (MIVA) that same year. Because the NCAA does not sponsor a separate Division II championship in men's volleyball, Quincy competed alongside Division I and Division II programs in the MIVA.

Quincy produced its most successful season during its MIVA tenure in 2011, finishing 22–14. The sixth-seeded Hawks upset third-seeded Ball State 3–1 on the road in the MIVA Tournament quarterfinals to advance to the conference semifinals. Quincy then fell 3–1 to second-seeded Loyola Chicago in the semifinal.

Quincy remained a member of the MIVA through the 2025 season, ending a 31-season association with the league. The Hawks moved to the Great Lakes Valley Conference when the GLVC began sponsoring men's volleyball during the 2025–26 academic year. Quincy finished its inaugural GLVC season in 2026 with a 10–13 overall record and a 7–7 conference mark.

Women's Volleyball

The Quincy women's volleyball program began competition in 1968. The Hawks posted several successful seasons during the NAIA era, including a 36–5 record and an appearance in the NAIA national championship tournament in 1985.

Quincy later transitioned to NCAA Division II competition and became a member of the Great Lakes Valley Conference. The Hawks advanced to the GLVC Tournament championship match for the first time in 1998 but were defeated by Northern Kentucky.

The program began one of its most successful stretches in 2022. Quincy finished 28–3, earned a share of the GLVC regular-season championship and received the No. 1 seed in the NCAA Division II Midwest Regional. Quincy hosted the regional at Pepsi Arena and defeated Northern Michigan in straight sets for the first NCAA Tournament victory in program history before being eliminated by Missouri–St. Louis in the regional semifinal. Mattison Norris and Makayla Knoblauch also became the program's first NCAA-era All-Americans following the season.

Quincy returned to the NCAA Division II Tournament in 2023, 2024 and 2025, giving the program four consecutive NCAA Tournament appearances. The Hawks earned another share of the GLVC regular-season championship in 2024. In 2025, Quincy reached the GLVC Tournament championship match for the second time in program history and the first time since 1998, falling to Missouri–St. Louis in four sets.

=== Wrestling ===
Men's Wrestling

Quincy announced the addition of men's and women's wrestling in April 2022, with both programs beginning competition during the 2022–23 academic year. The men's program began competition in NCAA Division II as a member of the Great Lakes Valley Conference.

During the program's inaugural season, Phillip Sims became the first Quincy men's wrestler to qualify for the NCAA Division II Wrestling Championships. Sims won the 149-pound championship at the 2023 NCAA Division II Super Region IV tournament, going 4–0 and defeating Darick Lapaglia of Central Missouri 4–3 in the championship match. He went on to record two victories at the NCAA Championships, falling one win short of earning All-America honors.

Sabian Russell became the second national qualifier in program history in 2025 after placing third at 141 pounds at the Super Region IV tournament. Russell won his opening match at the NCAA Division II Championships before finishing the tournament with a 1–2 record.

In 2026, Russell won the 149-pound championship at the NCAA Division II Super Region IV tournament to become the second regional champion in program history and qualify for the national championships for a second consecutive season. Quincy finished sixth among 11 teams at the regional, its best team finish in program history. The Hawks also finished the 2025–26 season with a 10–9 dual record, establishing a program record for dual victories in a season.

Women's Wrestling

Quincy's women's wrestling program also began competition during the 2022–23 academic year. The Hawks sent their first three wrestlers to the National Collegiate Women's Wrestling Championships in 2024 before increasing that total to six national qualifiers in 2025.

Trinity Pendergrass became the first All-American in Quincy wrestling history in 2025. Pendergrass won the 110-pound championship at the NCWWC Region VI tournament before placing seventh at the National Collegiate Women's Wrestling Championships. Her finish marked the first national placement and first All-America honor for either Quincy wrestling program.

The Great Lakes Valley Conference began sponsoring women's wrestling during the 2025–26 academic year, with Quincy among the conference's seven inaugural programs.

The program reached a new high point during the 2025–26 season. Quincy finished third among 15 teams at the NCAA Region V Championship and qualified four wrestlers for the inaugural NCAA Women's Wrestling Championships: Xochitl Mota-Pettis, Trinity Pendergrass, Alexandra Tchekounova and Maddy Barton.

At the inaugural NCAA championship in Coralville, Iowa, Mota-Pettis won the 124-pound national championship. The No. 3 seed went 4–0 and defeated McKendree's Shelby Moore 10–0 in the championship match. Mota-Pettis became the first national champion in Quincy wrestling history and the second Quincy athlete in any sport to win an individual national championship.

Pendergrass placed fifth at 103 pounds at the same championship to earn All-America honors for the second consecutive season, becoming the first two-time All-American in Quincy wrestling history. The Hawks scored 41 points and finished ninth nationally among 54 teams, the highest national team finish in program history.
