= 1977 NAIA soccer championship =

1977 NAIA Soccer Championship

Tournament details
- Country: United States; Canada
- Venue: Huntsville, Alabama
- Teams: 8

Final positions
- Champions: Quincy (IL) (7th title)
- Runners-up: Keene State
- Third place: Davis & Elkins
- Fourth place: Erskine

Tournament statistics
- Matches played: 12
- Goals scored: 26 (2.17 per match)

Awards
- Best player: (Nigeria) Emilio John, Quincy (IL)

The 1977 NAIA Soccer Championship was the 19th annual tournament held by the NAIA to determine the national champion of men's college soccer among its members in the United States and Canada.

Quincy (IL) defeated Keene State in the final, 3–0, to claim the Hawks' seventh NAIA national title.

The final was played in Huntsville, Alabama.

== Qualification ==
The tournament field remained fixed at eight teams. Third-, fifth-, and seventh-placed finals remained in place alongside the national championship match.

Qualified Teams
School	Appearance	Last Bid
Davis & Elkins	9th	1976
Erskine	5th	1974
Goshen	3rd	1975
Keene State	4th	1974
Midwestern State	1st	Never
Quincy (IL)	11th	1976
Rutgers–Camden	1st	Never
Simon Fraser	3rd	1976

== Bracket ==
Fifth place
Rutgers–Camden	0
Simon Fraser	2
Seventh place
Goshen	1
Midwestern State	3

Consolation semifinals
Rutgers–Camden	2
Goshen	1
Simon Fraser	1
Midwestern State	0

First round
Quincy (IL)	3
Rutgers–Camden	0
Erskine	1
Goshen	0
Davis & Elkins	1
Simon Fraser	0
Keene State	1
Midwestern State	0

Championship semifinals
Quincy (IL)	4
Erskine	0
Davis & Elkins	0
Keene State	1

Championship
Quincy (IL)	3
Keene State	0
Third place
Erskine	0
Davis & Elkins	2

== See also ==
- 1977 NCAA Division I soccer tournament
- 1977 NCAA Division II soccer tournament
