= 2015 Atlantic Sun men's soccer tournament =

- Classification: Division I
- Teams: 5
- Matches: 4
- Finals site: Hodges Stadium; Jacksonville, Florida
- Champions: North Florida (1st title)
- Winning coach: Derek Marinato (1st title)
- MVP: Helge Pietschmann (North Florida)
Atlantic Sun men's soccer tournament
«2014	2016»

The 2015 Atlantic Sun Conference men's soccer tournament, the 37th edition of the tournament, determined the Atlantic Sun Conference's automatic berth into the 2015 NCAA Division I Men's Soccer Championship.

The North Florida Ospreys won the tournament, besting the USC Upstate Spartans in the championship match. The 7–0 winning scoreline was the second most lopsided scoreline in an Atlantic Sun championship, and the largest since 1979.

This was the final edition of the tournament held under the "Atlantic Sun" or "A-Sun" branding. In April 2016, the conference announced a rebranding as the ASUN Conference.

== Qualification ==
2015 Atlantic Sun Conference men's soccer standings
	Conf.					Overall
Team	W		L		T	W		L		T
North Florida ‡	4	–	0	–	1	10	–	7	–	1
Florida Gulf Coast	4	–	0	–	1	7	–	4	–	3
Lipscomb	3	–	2	–	0	6	–	10	–	1
USC Upstate	2	–	3	–	1	7	–	7	–	1
Jacksonville	1	–	5	–	0	3	–	12	–	1
Stetson	0	–	4	–	1	5	–	9	–	2
‡-Tournament champion +- Invited to the NCAA Division I Men's Soccer Championship; As of November 20, 2015; Rankings from NSCAA

The top five teams in the Atlantic Sun Conference, based on their conference regular-season records, qualified for the tournament.

== Bracket ==
First round
4	USC Upstate (OT)	3
5	Jacksonville	2

Semifinals
1	Florida Gulf Coast	3
4	USC Upstate (OT)	4
2	North Florida (2OT)	2
3	Lipscomb	1

Final
4	USC Upstate	0
2	North Florida	7

== Schedule ==
=== First round ===
November 5, 2015	USC Upstate	3–2 (a.e.t.)	Jacksonville	Fort Myers, Florida
7:05 PM ET	Wild 41'; Schwarzer 82' (pen.) 98'	Report	Kelly 17'; Agredo 73'	Stadium: FGCU Soccer Complex; Attendance: 102; Referee: Jonathan Glover

=== Semi-finals ===
November 7, 2015	North Florida	2–1 (a.e.t.)	Lipscomb	Jacksonville, Florida
7:00 PM ET	Morrell 38'; Pietschmann 109'	Report	Ramirez 19'	Stadium: Hodges Stadium; Attendance: 634; Referee: Estaban Rosano

November 7, 2015	Florida Gulf Coast	3–4 (a.e.t.)	USC Upstate	Fort Myers, Florida
7:05 PM ET	Wilks 11'; Ruiz 68'; Robledo 80'	Report	Sommer 27'; Wild 73'; Schwarzer 87'; Dovidio 97'	Stadium: FGCU Soccer Complex; Attendance: 501; Referee: Randy Cook

=== Championship ===
November 14, 2015	North Florida	7–0	USC Upstate	Jacksonville, Florida
7:00 PM ET	D'Mello 24'; Garcia 43'; Pietschmann 48', 51', 54'; Castro 56'; Nicholson 87'	Report		Stadium: Hodges Stadium; Attendance: 1,609; Referee: Rob Mann

== Statistical leaders ==
=== Top goalscorers ===
Rank	Player	College	Goals

As of 15 November 2015

== Tournament Best XI ==
On November 15, the Atlantic Sun Conference determined the tournament's best XI

Note: Flags indicate national team as defined under FIFA eligibility rules; some limited exceptions apply. Players may hold more than one non-FIFA nationality.

No.	Pos.	Nation	Player
1	DF	USA	Tucker Beerman (USC Upstate)
2	DF	USA	Casey Caronis (North Florida)
3	MF	USA	Jay Bolt (North Florida)
4	MF	USA	Omar Castro (North Florida)
5	MF	USA	Matt Kerridge (Lipscomb)
6	MF	GER	Leon Schwarzer (USC Upstate)
7	MF	GUA	Rodrigo Saravia (Florida Gulf Coast)
8	FW	USA	Alex Morrell (North Florida)
9	FW	GER	Helge Pietschmann (North Florida)
10	FW	ESP	Albert Ruiz (Florida Gulf Coast)
11	FW	GER	Gordon Wild (USC Upstate)

== See also ==
- ASUN Conference
- 2015 Atlantic Sun Conference men's soccer season
- 2015 NCAA Division I men's soccer season
- 2015 NCAA Division I Men's Soccer Championship
