= Jacob Ward =

American journalist

- Born: 1974 (age 51–52)
- Occupation: Journalist
- Notable credit(s): Al Jazeera America News; Popular Science; The Industry Standard; Discovery Channel; NOVA ScienceNow

Jacob Ward (born 1974) is an American science and technology journalist. In 2018, he was the former technology correspondent for NBC News, reporting on technology's social implications. He was the editor-in-chief of Popular Science, and from 2013 to 2018 was a science and technology correspondent for Al Jazeera America and Al Jazeera English. In 2018, he became a fellow at the Center for Advanced Study in the Behavioral Sciences at Stanford University, sponsored by the Berggruen Institute.

== Journalism ==
Ward began as a reporter at The Industry Standard, on the then emerging Internet economy in 1997. Ward joined Popular Science as deputy editor in 2006. In 2012, he succeeded the prior editor-in-chief, Mark Jannot. Later that year he was named one of the "Most Intriguing People in Media" by MIN.

== Television and radio ==
Ward hosted The Truth About Traffic on the Discovery Channel in 2009, and was a correspondent for Neil DeGrasse Tyson on NOVA ScienceNow on PBS in 2010. In 2012, Ward hosted two shows for the National Geographic Channel: a one-hour special, American's Money Vault, and a second one-hour special, Top Secret. In 2013, Ward left Popular Science to join Al Jazeera America, a cable news network launched that same year, as the channel's science and technology correspondent. After the shutdown of the channel he was retained by Al Jazeera for Al Jazeera English. In December 2018 he began as technology correspondent on NBC News, reporting for Nightly News, TODAY, and MSNBC as part of NBC's Business and Technology Unit.

== Bibliography ==
=== Essays and reporting ===
- Ward, Jacob (January 2014). "The trials and torments of space school : what does it take to become a citizen astronaut?". Popular Science (Australian Ed.). 62: 58–64.
