= Erik Lefebvre =

Canadian soccer player (born 1986)

Personal information
- Full name: Erik Lefebvre
- Date of birth: July 16, 1986 (age 40)
- Place of birth: Orleans, Ontario, Canada
- Height: 6 ft 4 in (1.93 m)
- Position: Goalkeeper

Youth career
- 2005–2008: Houghton Highlanders

Senior career*
Years	Team	Apps	(Gls)
2003	Cumberland Cobras		
2004	Ottawa Royals		
2007–2008	Ottawa Fury	20	(0)
2009–2010	Charlotte Eagles	8	(0)
- * Club domestic league appearances and goals as of August 15, 2010

Erik Lefebvre (born July 16, 1986) is a Canadian soccer player who last played for Charlotte Eagles in the USL Second Division.

== Career ==
=== College and amateur ===
Lefebvre attended Béatrice-Desloges High School and played amateur soccer in Canada for the Cumberland Cobras and the Ottawa Royals as a teenager, leading the Royals to the Ontario Cup Championship in 2004.

He played college soccer at Houghton College, where he was an All-AMC North Division first team member and freshman of the year in 2005, as well as NAIA All-American second team and All-AMC North Division first team member in 2006.

During his collegiate years Lefebvre also played two seasons for Ottawa Fury in the Premier Development League.

=== Professional ===
Following his graduation, and after spending time training with Canadian professional side Ottawa Wizards and Troyes AC in France, Lefebvre joined Charlotte Eagles of the USL Second Division in 2009 as backup to first choice goalkeeper Kevin Trapp. He made his debut in Charlotte's last game of the 2009 regular season on August 15, 2009, playing 90 minutes in a 3–0 victory over the Western Mass Pioneers.

Lefebvre took over as Interim Director of Goalkeeping for Charlotte Soccer Academy in 2011. This year Erik Lefebvre will return for his third season as the Goalkeeper Coach.
