= Rockhurst Hawks =

- University: Rockhurst University
- Conference: Great Lakes Valley Conference
- NCAA: Division II
- Athletic director: Kristy Bayer
- Location: Kansas City, Missouri
- Varsity teams: 20
- Basketball arena: Mason-Halpin Field House
- Baseball stadium: Loyola Park Baseball Field
- Softball stadium: Loyola Park Softball Field
- Soccer stadium: Bourke Field
- Golf course: Sycamore Ridge Golf Course
- Tennis venue: Plaza Tennis Center
- Mascot: Rock E. Hawk
- Nickname: Hawks
- Colors: Blue and white
- Website: rockhursthawks.com
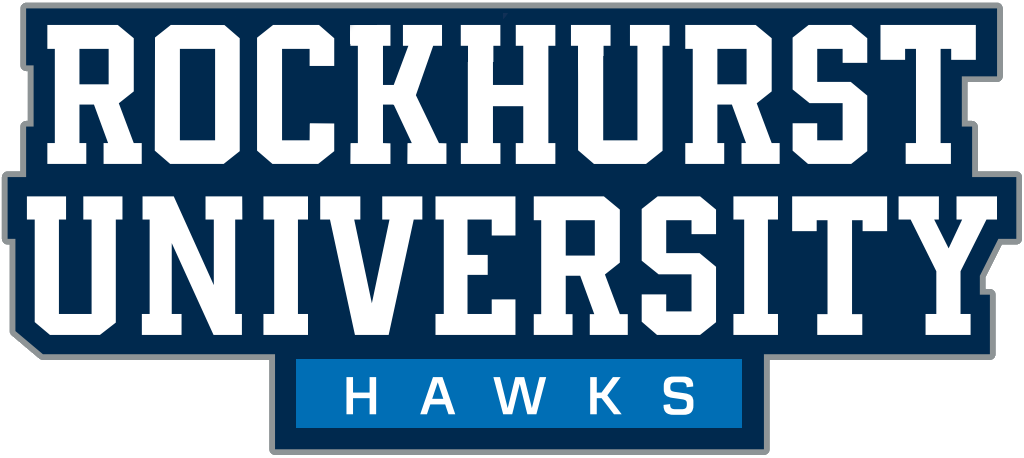

The Rockhurst Hawks are the athletic teams that represent Rockhurst University, located in Kansas City, Missouri, in NCAA Division II intercollegiate sports. Rockhurst is a member of the Great Lakes Valley Conference (GLVC) for 19 of its 20 varsity sports. The only current exception is men's volleyball, which is competing as an independent in the 2025 season (2024–25 school year) before the GLVC starts a men's volleyball league in the 2026 season.

The university has added seven new NCAA sports in the 2020s. First, in the 2023–24 school year, swimming & diving, plus indoor and outdoor track & field, were added for both sexes. All of these sports were already sponsored by the GLVC. Then, in 2024–25, men's volleyball was added. That team is a de facto NCAA Division I program; the NCAA holds a combined championship for Divisions I and II, and scholarship limits are identical between the two divisions. In addition to the new varsity sports, competitive cheerleading and dance teams were added in 2023–24.

There is also an intramurals program on campus, with many students participating in a 30-event program throughout the school year.

== History ==
The Hawks were previously members of the Heartland Conference from 1999 through 2005, Rockhurst's first conference home after transitioning from the NAIA in 1999.

In 2013, Rockhurst University added three varsity athletic teams: men's and women's lacrosse and women's cross country.

== Varsity sports ==
Men's sports	Women's sports
Baseball	Basketball
Basketball	Cross Country
Cross Country	Golf
Golf	Lacrosse
Lacrosse	Soccer
Soccer	Softball
Swimming and diving	Swimming and diving
Tennis	Tennis
Track and field	Track and field
Volleyball	Volleyball

=== Soccer ===
The Rockhurst men's soccer team competed in the NAIA from 1973 to 1997, Rockhurst played in 17 national tournaments, advanced to the Final Four 10 times, and finished national runner-up four times in 1973, 1976, 1979, and 1997. Since joining the NCAA in 1998, the soccer team has played in 19 national tournaments, advancing to the Final Four 3 times (2013, 2015, and 2016)

Since becoming an NCAA Division II member institution in 1998, Rockhurst men's soccer has finished in the final Top 25 Poll 10 times, and since 2011, the Hawks have finished in the top 10 each season. Men's soccer finished #3 in the nation in 2015 and 2016.

Men's soccer coach Tony Tocco has coached for 46 seasons and led the team to 13 Final Four appearances. At the end of the 2016 season, Tocco's 680 career victories ranks second in men's college soccer history, three fewer than Ohio Wesleyan head coach Jay Martin.

Following the 2007–2008 school year, Rockhurst was recognized by the National Soccer Coaches Association of America as one of 67 colleges and universities in the nation (among all NCAA and NAIA divisions) to have both men's and women's soccer teams receive the NSCAA Team Academic Award. To receive the award, a team must achieve a grade point average of 3.0 or higher. The women's soccer team achieved a 3.62 GPA, ranking them #4 in the nation.

Rockhurst University alumnus, Kyle Miller (class of 2011), recently signed with the MLS Sporting Kansas City soccer team in Kansas City, Kansas, for the 2012 season.

== Facilities ==
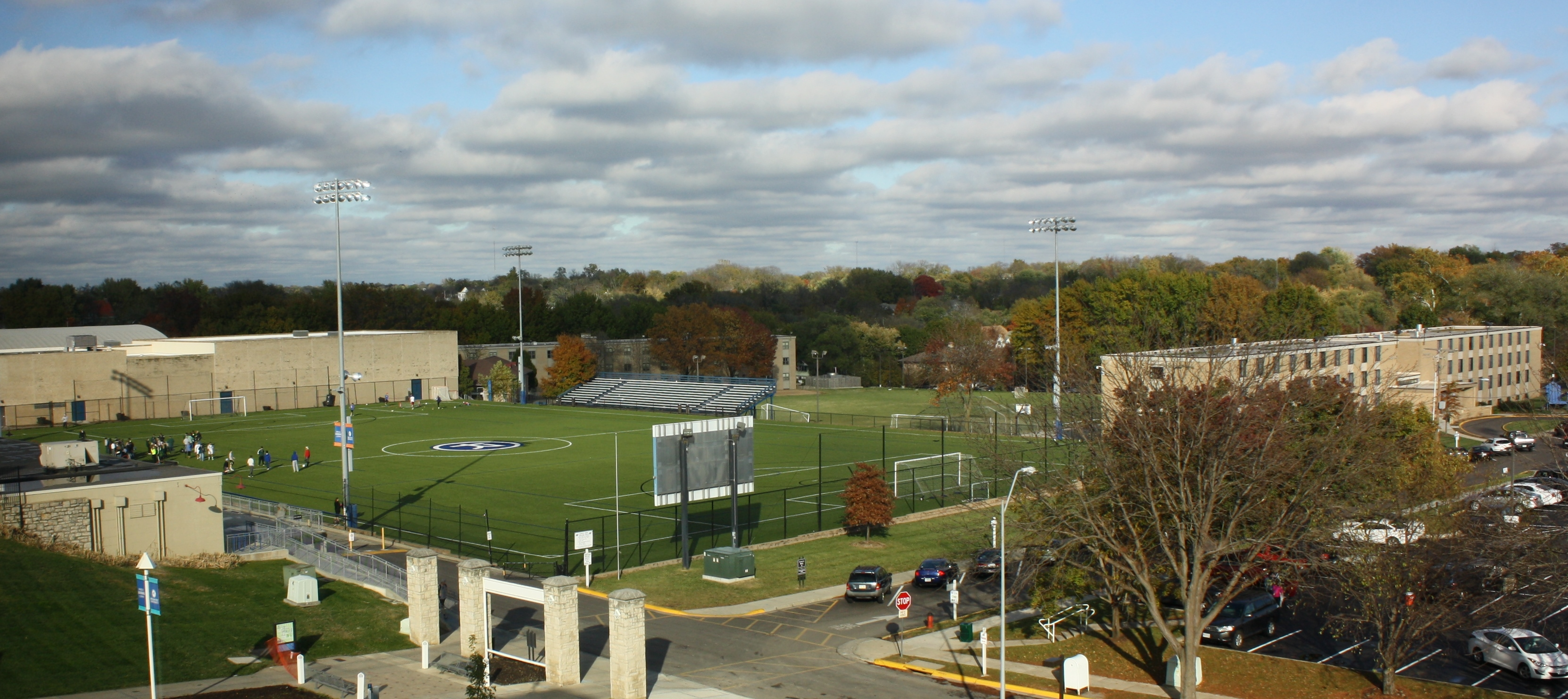
Rockhurst field

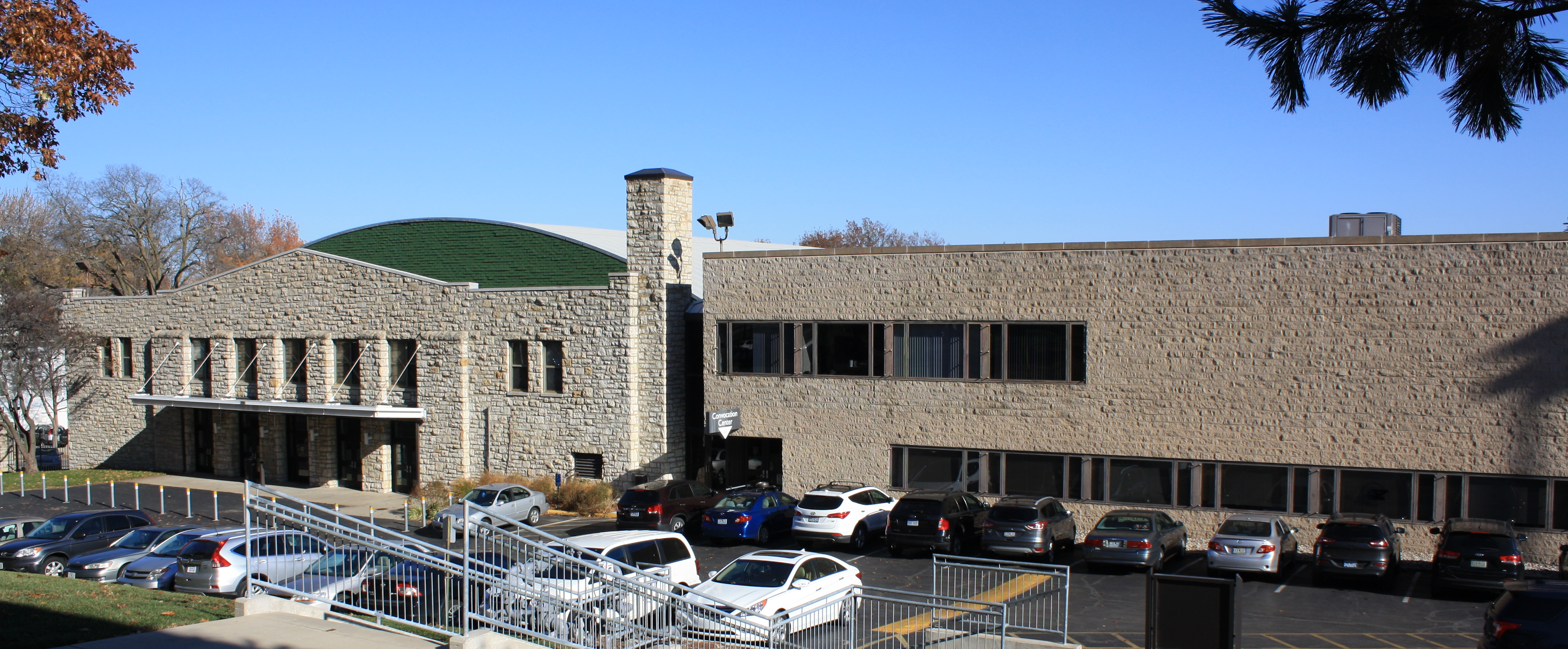
Rockhurst U. gymnasium

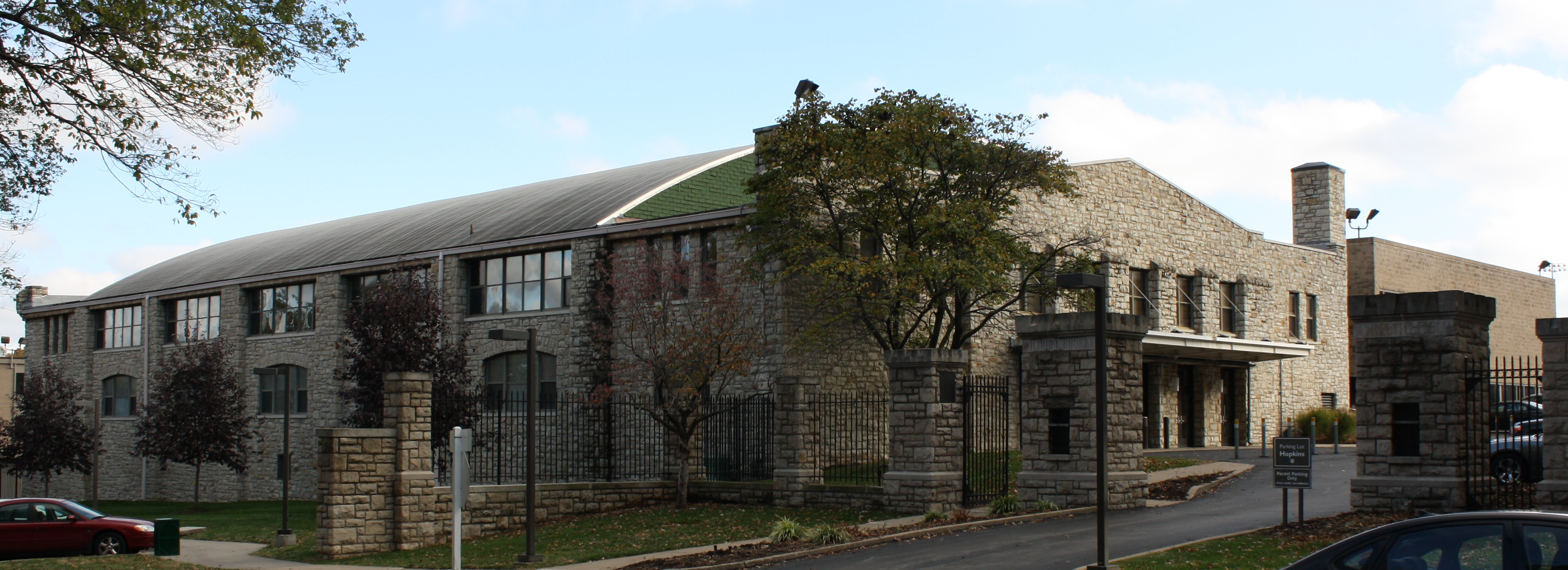
Fieldhouse & gym

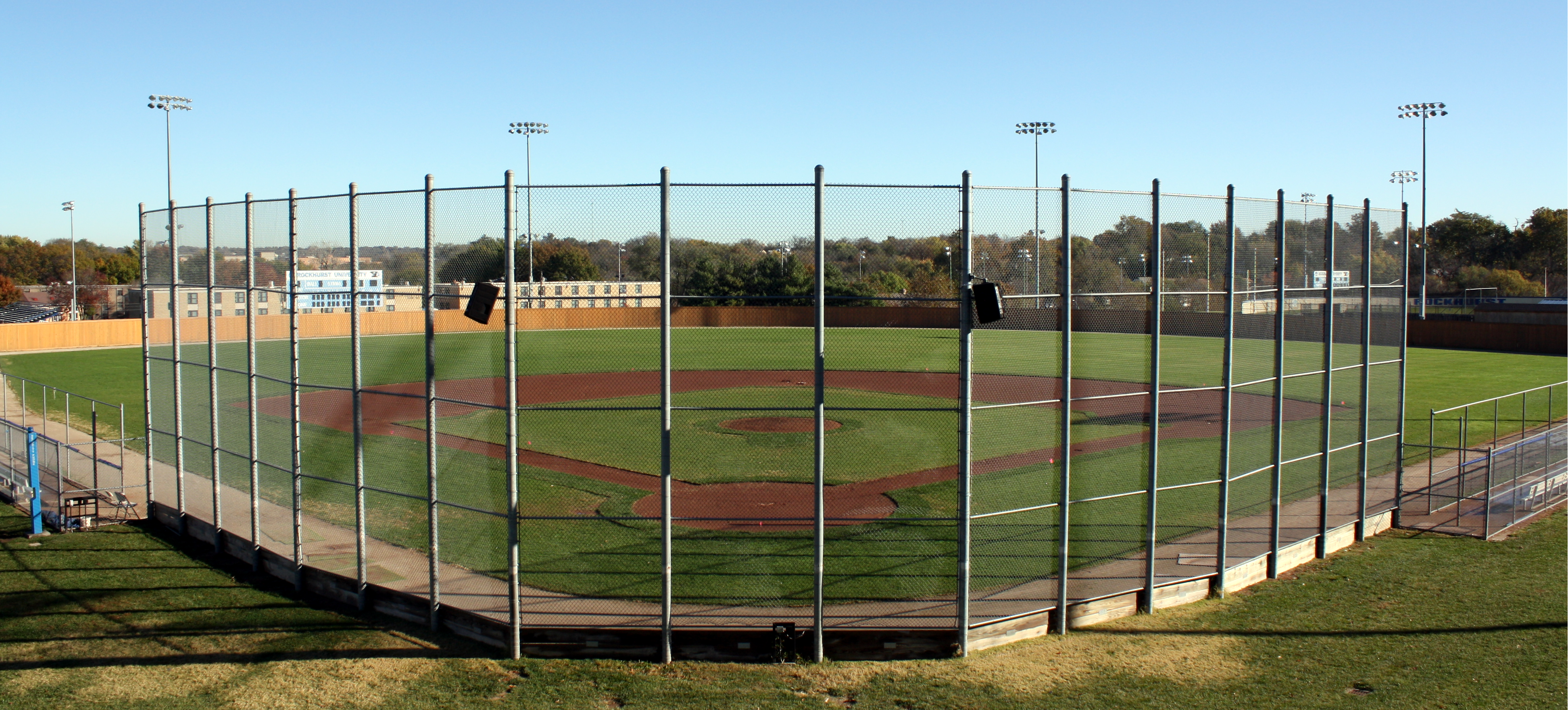
Baseball field

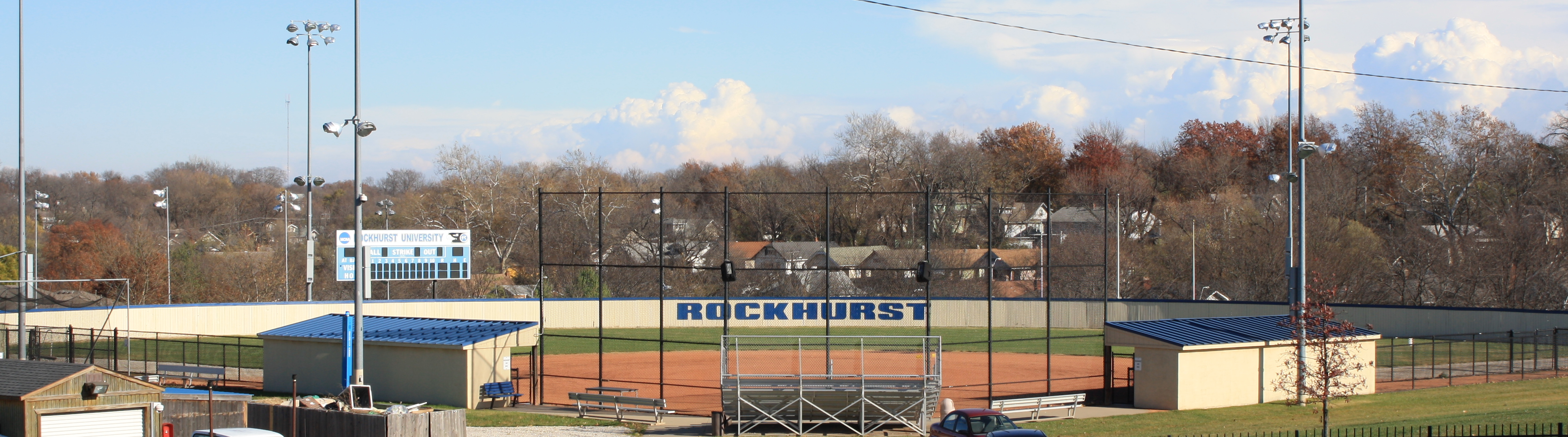
Softball field

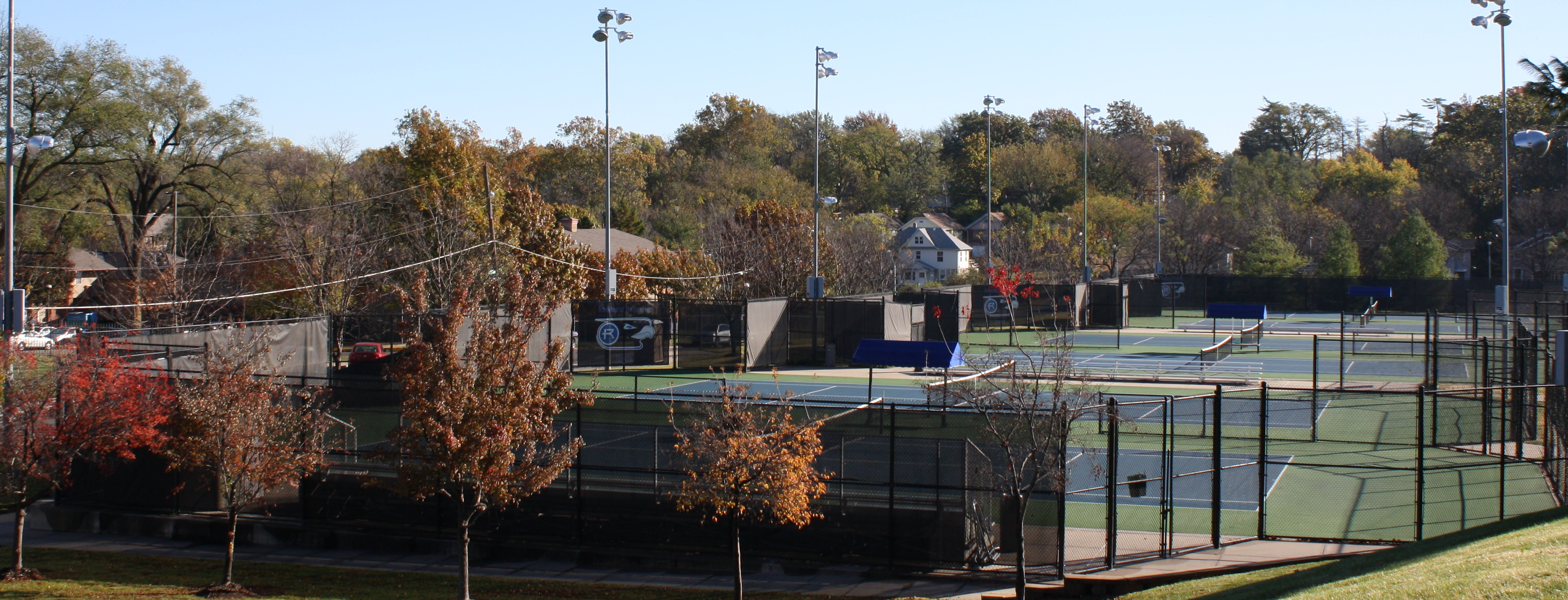
Tennis courts
