= Jerry Smith (soccer) =

American soccer coach (born 1960)

Current position
- Title: Head coach
- Team: Santa Clara
- Conference: WCC
- Record: 579–191–90 (.726)

Biographical details
- Born: December 31, 1960 (age 65)
- Education: California State University, East Bay

Coaching career (HC unless noted)
- 1980–1986: Homestead HS (boys')
- 1982–1986: Foothill (men's asst.)
- 1986: Foothill
- 1987–present: Santa Clara

Head coaching record
- Overall: 579–191–90 (.726)

Accomplishments and honors

Championships
- NCAA Division I (2001, 2020); 12× WCC Tournament

Awards
- National Coach of the Year (2001)

Jerry Wayne Smith (born December 31, 1960) is an American soccer coach who is currently head coach of the women's soccer program at Santa Clara University.

== Coaching career ==
=== Collegiate ===
Smith began his coaching career in 1980 as head boys' soccer coach at his alma mater Homestead High School in Cupertino, California, where he was head coach for seven seasons. From 1982 to 1986, he was men's soccer assistant coach at Foothill College in nearby Los Altos and was head women's soccer coach at Foothill in 1986.

After completing his bachelor's degree in kinesiology at California State University, Hayward in 1986, Smith became the head coach at Santa Clara University in 1987. In 2001, he coached the Broncos to its first NCAA Division I Women's Soccer Championship after defeating 17-time champion North Carolina 1–0. He has coached the team to 11 West Coast Conference titles and 33 NCAA tournaments.

=== International ===
In 2001, Smith was named head coach of the United States women's national under-21 soccer team.

== Head coaching record ==
Record table
Season	Team	Overall	Conference	Standing	Postseason
Santa Clara Broncos (NCAA Division I independent) (1987–1991)
1987	Santa Clara	10–4–3			
1988	Santa Clara	11–7–1			
1989	Santa Clara	14–5			College Cup Semifinals
1990	Santa Clara	18–1–1			College Cup Semifinals
1991	Santa Clara	10–6			NCAA First Round
Santa Clara Broncos (West Coast Conference) (1992–present)
1992	Santa Clara	12–5–2	3–1	2nd	College Cup Semifinals
1993	Santa Clara	15–5	6–0	1st	NCAA First Round
1994	Santa Clara	14–5–1	5–2	2nd	NCAA First Round
1995	Santa Clara	16–4–2	5–1–1	2nd	NCAA Quarterfinals
1996	Santa Clara	18–4–2	5–2	2nd	College Cup Semifinals
1997	Santa Clara	20–3–1	6–1	2nd	College Cup Semifinals
1998	Santa Clara	22–1–1	7–0	1st	College Cup Semifinals
1999	Santa Clara	23–1	7–0	1st	College Cup Semifinals
2000	Santa Clara	16–7–1	4–3	5th	NCAA Quarterfinals
2001	Santa Clara	23–2	6–1	1st	College Cup Champions
2002	Santa Clara	20–5–1	6–1	T–1st	College Cup Runners-up
2003	Santa Clara	14–4–6	6–0–1	1st	NCAA Quarterfinals
2004	Santa Clara	18–5–2	6–1	T–1st	College Cup Semifinals
2005	Santa Clara	17–5–2	4–2–1	2nd	NCAA Quarterfinals
2006	Santa Clara	15–5–1	5–1–1	1st	NCAA First Round
2007	Santa Clara	12–6–3	4–3	3rd	NCAA First Round
2008	Santa Clara	4–11–4	1–4–2	6th	
2009	Santa Clara	14–7–2	5–2	2nd	NCAA Third Round
2010	Santa Clara	13–7–2	4–3	T–2nd	NCAA Second Round
2011	Santa Clara	13–2–6	6–1–1	3rd	NCAA First Round
2012	Santa Clara	12–4–6	4–1–3	3rd	NCAA Second Round
2013	Santa Clara	16–4–2	8–1	T–1st	NCAA Third Round
2014	Santa Clara	14–6	7–2	2nd	
2015	Santa Clara	14–6–2	6–1–2	4th	NCAA Second Round
2016	Santa Clara	12–7–4	6–2–1	3rd	NCAA Quarterfinals
2017	Santa Clara	15–7–1	8–1	2nd	NCAA Third Round
2018	Santa Clara	17–3–2	7–2	2nd	NCAA Second Round
2019	Santa Clara	15–6–2	7–0–2	2nd	NCAA Third Round
2020	Santa Clara	11–1	6–1	1st	College Cup Champions
2021	Santa Clara	15–5–3	8–1	2nd	College Cup Semifinals
2022	Santa Clara	11–7–3	7–0–2	1st	NCAA Second Round
2023	Santa Clara	14–5–2	6–2	3rd	NCAA Second Round
2024	Santa Clara	13–4–4	6–1–3	T–1st	NCAA Second Round
2025	Santa Clara	8–6–5	4–2–5	T–6th	
2026	Santa Clara	10–2–9	4–0–5	4th	
Santa Clara:		579–191–90 (.726)	195–45–32 (.776)		
Total:		579–191–90 (.726)			
National champion Postseason invitational champion Conference regular season champion Conference regular season and conference tournament champion Division regular season champion Division regular season and conference tournament champion Conference tournament champion

== Personal life ==
Smith is married to Brandi Chastain; they have a son, Jaden Chastain Smith, born in June 2006. Smith also has a son from a previous relationship, Cameron Smith.

== See also ==
- List of college women's soccer coaches with 300 wins
