= 2015 NCAA Division II women's soccer tournament =

Tournament details
- Country: United States
- Dates: December 3–5, 2015
- Teams: 48

Final positions
- Champions: Grand Valley State
- Runner-up: Columbus State

Tournament statistics
- Matches played: 47
- All statistics correct as of 12/05/2015.

The 2015 NCAA Division II women's soccer tournament will be the 28th annual single-elimination tournament to determine the national champion of NCAA Division II women's collegiate soccer. The semifinals and championship game will be played at Ashton Brosnaham Stadium in Pensacola, Florida from December 3–5, 2015 while the preceding rounds will be played at various sites across the country during November 2015.

== Qualification ==
All Division II women's soccer programs were eligible to qualify for the tournament. The tournament field remained fixed at 48 teams. 22 teams received automatic bids by winning their conference tournaments and an additional 26 teams earned at-large bids based on their regular season records. Teams were placed into one of eight six-team regional brackets based on geographic location.

=== Automatic qualifiers (22) ===
Conference	Champion	Record
CCAA

=== At-large qualifiers (26) ===
Team	Conference	Record

== Tournament bracket ==
=== Southeast and South Regionals ===
First round November 13, 2015	Second round November 15, 2015
1	Carson–Newman*	3
5	Armstrong State	0
4	Wingate	0
5	Armstrong State	5
Southeast Regional
3	North Georgia	4
6	Limestone	0
3	North Georgia	1
2	Columbus State*	2
1	Barry*	1
4	West Florida	0
4	West Florida	1
5	Nova Southeastern	0
South Regional
3	Tampa	1
6	Lee	0
3	Tampa	1
2	North Alabama*	0

Regional Finals; November 20, 2015
1	Carson-Newman*	1
2	Columbus State	4
1	Barry*	1
3	Tampa	0

Quarterfinals; November 22, 2015
SE2	Columbus State	2
S1	Barry	0

=== East and Atlantic Regionals ===
First round November 13, 2015	Second round November 15, 2015
1	Bridgeport*	1
5	LIU Post	0
4	Roberts Wesleyan	1
5	LIU Post	1
East Regional
3	Saint Rose	0
6	Philadelphia	0
6	Philadelphia	0
2	Adelphi*	1
1	Gannon*	1
4	Edinboro	2
4	Edinboro	0
5	Charleston (WV)	0
Atlantic Regional
3	West Chester	1
6	East Stroudsburg	2
6	East Stroudsburg	3
2	WV Wesleyan*	0

Regional Finals; November 20, 2015
1	Bridgeport*	2
2	Adelphi	1
4	Edinboro*	0
6	East Stroudsburg	2

Quarterfinals; November 22, 2015
E1	Bridgeport*	2
A6	East Stroudsburg	0

=== West and South Central Regionals ===
First round November 13, 2015	Second round November 15, 2015
1	Western Washington*	1
5	Seattle Pacific	0
4	UC San Diego	1
5	Seattle Pacific	2
West Regional
3	Sonoma State	2
6	Point Loma Nazarene	0
3	Sonoma State	0
2	Azusa Pacific*	1
1	Angelo State*	0
5	St. Edward's (TX)	1
4	Fort Lewis	0
5	St. Edward's (TX)	0
South Central Regional
3	TAMU–Commerce	1
6	Colorado Mines	2
6	Colorado Mines	0
2	Dallas Baptist*	2

Regional Finals; November 20, 2015
1	Western Washington*	1
2	Azusa Pacific	0
5	St. Edward's (TX)	0
2	Dallas Baptist*	1

Quarterfinals; November 22, 2015
W1	Western Washington*	3
SC2	Dallas Baptist	1

=== Central and Midwest Regionals ===
First round November 13, 2015	Second round November 15, 2015
1	Central Missouri*	2
4	Minot State	0
4	Minot State	1
5	Winona State	0
Central Regional
3	Augustana (SD)	2
6	Harding	1
3	Augustana (SD)	0
2	Minnesota State*	2
1	Grand Valley State*	6
4	Quincy	0
4	Quincy	1
5	UM–Saint Louis	0
Midwest Regional
3	Truman	1
6	Cedarville	0
3	Truman	0
2	Bellarmine*	1

Regional Finals; November 20, 2015
1	Central Missouri*	1
2	Minnesota State	0
1	Grand Valley State*	2
2	Bellarmine	1

Quarterfinals; November 22, 2015
C1	Central Missouri*	1
M1	Grand Valley State	1

=== College Cup ===
Semifinals; December 3, 2015; Ashton Brosnaham Stadium; Pensacola, Florida
2	Columbus State	3
1	Bridgeport	1
1	Western Washington	2
1	Grand Valley St.	3

Championship; December 5, 2015; Ashton Brosnaham Stadium; Pensacola, Florida
2	Columbus State	0
1	Grand Valley State	2

== See also ==
- NCAA Women's Soccer Championships (Division I, Division III)
- NCAA Men's Soccer Championships (Division I, Division II, Division III)
