= 1992 NCAA Division II women's soccer tournament =

Tournament details
- Country: United States
- Teams: 6

Final positions
- Champions: Barry Buccaneers (2nd title, 4th title match)
- Runners-up: Adelphi Panthers (1st title match)

Tournament statistics
- Matches played: 3
- Goals scored: 20 (6.67 per match)
- Top goal scorer(s): Jennifer Shannon, Barry (3 goals, 0 assists)

The 1992 NCAA Division II women's soccer tournament was the fifth annual NCAA-sponsored tournament to determine the team national champion of Division II women's college soccer in the United States.

The championship match was hosted at Adelphi University in Garden City, New York.

Barry defeated hosts Adelphi in the final, 3–2, to claim their second national title.

== Qualified teams ==
Team	Appearance	Previous
Adelphi	4th	1991
Barry	5th	1991
Chico State	1st	—
Franklin Pierce	1st	—
Keene State	5th	1991
Sonoma State	3rd	1991

== Bracket ==
First round
Franklin Pierce	3**
Keene State	2
Sonoma State	1**
Chico State	0

Semifinals
Barry	3**
Franklin Pierce	2
Adelphi	3
Sonoma State	1

Championship
Barry	3
Adelphi	2

== See also ==
- 1992 NCAA Division I Women's Soccer Tournament
- NCAA Division III Women's Soccer Championship
- 1992 NCAA Division II Men's Soccer Championship
- NAIA Women's Soccer Championship
