= 1991 NCAA Division II women's soccer tournament =

Tournament details
- Country: United States
- Teams: 6

Final positions
- Champions: Cal State Dominguez Hills Toros (1st title, 1st title match)
- Runners-up: Sonoma State Cossacks (2nd title match)

Tournament statistics
- Matches played: 3
- Goals scored: 11 (3.67 per match)
- Top goal scorer(s): Jennifer Grasso, CSU Dominguez Hills (2 goals, 2 assists); Amy Rubin, CSU Dominguez Hills (3 goals, 0 assists)

The 1991 NCAA Division II women's soccer tournament was the fourth annual NCAA-sponsored tournament to determine the team national champion of Division II women's college soccer in the United States.

The championship match was hosted at California State University, Dominguez Hills in Carson, California.

Hosts Cal State Dominguez Hills defeated defending champions Sonoma State in the final, 2–1, to claim the Toros' first national title.

== Qualified teams ==
| Team | Appearance | Previous |
|---|---|---|
| Adelphi | 3rd | 1989 |
| Barry | 4th | 1990 |
| Cal State Dominguez Hills | 2nd | 1989 |
| Keene State | 4th | 1990 |
| Mercyhurst | 1st | — |
| Sonoma State | 2nd | 1990 |

== Bracket ==
First round
Adelphi | 1
Keene State | 0
CSU Dominguez Hills | 2**
Mercyhurst | 1

Semifinals
Sonoma State | 1
Adelphi | 0
Barry | 0
CSU Dominguez Hills | 3

Championship
Sonoma State | 1
CSU Dominguez Hills | 2

== See also ==
- 1991 NCAA Division I Women's Soccer Tournament
- NCAA Division III Women's Soccer Championship
- 1991 NCAA Division II Men's Soccer Championship
- NAIA Women's Soccer Championship
