= Louellen Poore =

American soccer player (born 1970)

Personal information
- Full name: Louellen Poore
- Date of birth: January 30, 1970 (age 56)
- Place of birth: Land o' Lakes, Florida, U.S.
- Height: 5 ft 4 in (1.63 m)
- Position: Defender

Youth career
- Blackwatch Heather

College career
Years	Team	Apps	(Gls)
1988–1991	North Carolina Tar Heels	86	(7)

International career
1992	United States	2	(0)

Louellen Poore (born January 30, 1970) is an American former soccer player who played as a defender, making two appearances for the United States women's national team.

== Career ==
In college, Poore played for the North Carolina Tar Heels where she was a letter-winner and NCAA champion in all four seasons (1988, 1989, 1990, 1991). In 86 appearances, she scored 7 goals and registered 5 assists. She was a Soccer America First-Team and NSCAA Second-Team All-American in 1991. That year she was also included in the All-ACC Conference Selection and All-ACC Tournament Selection. In 1992, she was the recipient of the North Carolina Women's Soccer Athletic Director's Scholar-Athlete Award.

Poore made her international debut for the United States on August 14, 1992 in a friendly match against Norway, which finished as a 1–3 loss. She earned her second and final cap two days later against the same opponent, which finished as a 2–4 loss.

== Personal life ==
Poore graduated from the University of North Carolina at Chapel Hill with a Bachelor of Arts in December 1992.

== Career statistics ==
=== International ===
United States
Year	Apps	Goals
1992	2	0
Total	2	0
