= 1990 NCAA Division II women's soccer tournament =

Tournament details
- Country: United States
- Teams: 4

Final positions
- Champions: Sonoma State Cossacks (1st title, 1st title match)
- Runners-up: Barry Buccaneers (3rd title match)

Tournament statistics
- Matches played: 3
- Goals scored: 8 (2.67 per match)
- Top goal scorer(s): Karen Beckner, Sonoma State (1 goals, 2 assists)

The 1990 NCAA Division II women's soccer tournament was the third annual NCAA-sponsored tournament to determine the team national champion of Division II women's college soccer in the United States.

The championship was hosted at Barry University in Miami Shores, Florida.

Sonoma State defeated defending champions Barry in the final, 2–0, to claim their first national title.

== Qualified teams ==
Team	Appearance	Previous
Adelphi	2nd	1989
Barry	3rd	1989
Keene State	3rd	1989
Sonoma State	1st	—

== Bracket ==
Semifinals
Keene State	1***
Adelphi	1
Sonoma State	2***
Barry	2

Championship
Keene State	0
Sonoma State	2

== See also ==
- 1990 NCAA Division I Women's Soccer Tournament
- NCAA Division III Women's Soccer Championship
- 1990 NCAA Division II Men's Soccer Championship
- NAIA Women's Soccer Championship
