= Samantha Bohon =

American soccer player and coach (born 1976)

Personal information
- Date of birth: June 7, 1976 (age 50)
- Place of birth: Fort Lauderdale, Florida, U.S.
- Height: 5 ft 7 in (1.70 m)
- Position: Defender

College career
Years	Team	Apps	(Gls)
1994–1997	Duke Blue Devils	82	(16)

International career
1998–1999	United States	2	(1)

Managerial career
- 1998–1999: Duke Blue Devils (volunteer assistant)
- 2001–2004: Tennessee Volunteers (assistant)
- 2007–2022: Embry Riddle
- 2022–2025: Florida Gators

Samantha Baggett Bohon (born Samantha Lea Baggett; June 7, 1976) is an American soccer head coach and retired player who was a member of the United States women's national soccer team.

== Personal life ==
Bohon was born in Fort Lauderdale, Florida, and grew up in Daytona Beach where she attended Seabreeze High School. She earned her bachelor's degree from Duke University in 1998 with a double major in English and sociology, and received an M.A. in sport administration from the University of North Carolina at Chapel Hill in 2001.

== International career statistics ==
Appearances and goals by national team and year
National team	Year	Apps	Goals
United States	1998	1	0
United States	1999	1	1
Total		2	1

Scores and results list the United States' goal tally first, score column indicates score after each Bohon goal.

List of international goals scored by Samantha Bohon
No.	Date	Venue	Opponent	Score	Result	Competition	Ref.
1	February 24, 1999	Orlando, Florida	Finland	2–0	3–1	Friendly	

== Collegiate coaching record ==
Record table
Season	Team	Overall	Conference	Standing	Postseason
Embry–Riddle Eagles (Sun Conference) (2007–2014)
2007	Embry–Riddle	7–11–0	3–2–0	3rd	NAIA First Round
2008	Embry–Riddle	8–9–0	6–4–0	3rd	NAIA First Round
2009	Embry–Riddle	14–6–0	8–1–0	1st	NAIA First Round
2010	Embry–Riddle	14–3–3	6–1–2	2nd	NAIA First Round
2011	Embry–Riddle	18–3–1	9–1–0	2nd	NAIA Quarterfinals
2012	Embry–Riddle	17–6–0	8–1–0	1st	NAIA Second Round
2013	Embry–Riddle	16–5–1	8–1–0	1st North	NAIA Quarterfinals
2014	Embry–Riddle	19–2–0	9–0–0	1st North	NAIA Semifinalist
Embry–Riddle Eagles (Sunshine State Conference) (2015–2021)
2015	Embry–Riddle	11–3–1			
2016	Embry–Riddle	8–5–2			
2017	Embry–Riddle	5–5–3	3–4–3	7th	
2018	Embry–Riddle	8–8–0	5–5–0	5th	
2019	Embry–Riddle	12–6–2	6–3–1	4th	NCAA DII Third Round
2020	Embry–Riddle				
2021	Embry–Riddle	10–4–3	7–2–1	1st	NCAA DII First Round
Embry–Riddle:		167–76–16 (.676)	78–25–6 (.743)		
Florida Gators (SEC) (2022–Present)
2022	Florida	2–14–1	0–9–1	14th	
2023	Florida	6–5–6	2–4–4	13th	
2024	Florida	4–8–6	1–7–2	15th	
2025	Florida	6–7–8	2–3–5	11th	
Florida:		18–34–18 (.386)	5–23–12 (.275)		
Total:		185–110–35 (.614)			
National champion Postseason invitational champion Conference regular season champion Conference regular season and conference tournament champion Division regular season champion Division regular season and conference tournament champion Conference tournament champion
