= NCAA women's soccer tournament =

The NCAA Women's Soccer Championship refers to one of three championships in women's soccer organized by the National Collegiate Athletic Association (NCAA):

- NCAA Division I women's soccer tournament, 1982–present
- NCAA Division II women's soccer tournament, 1988–present
- NCAA Division III women's soccer tournament, 1986–present

== See also ==
- AIAW Champions#Soccer
