= 1992 NCAA Division I women's soccer tournament =

1992 NCAA women's soccer tournament
Women's College Cup (semifinals & final)

Tournament details
- Country: United States
- Dates: November–December 1992
- Teams: 12

Final positions
- Champions: North Carolina Tar Heels (10th title, 11th College Cup)
- Runners-up: Duke Blue Devils (1st title match, 1st College Cup)
- Semifinalists: Hartford Hawks (1st College Cup); Santa Clara Broncos (3rd College Cup)

Tournament statistics
- Matches played: 11
- Goals scored: 40 (3.64 per match)
- Attendance: 13,893 (1,263 per match)
- Top goal scorer(s): Mia Hamm, UNC (5)

Awards
- Best player: Mia Hamm, UNC (Offensive); Sue Wall, SCU (Defensive)
- All statistics correct as of 5/9/2015.

The 1992 NCAA Division I women's soccer tournament was the 11th annual single-elimination tournament to determine the national champion of NCAA Division I women's collegiate soccer. The championship game was played at Fetzer Field in Chapel Hill, North Carolina during December 1992.

North Carolina defeated rival Duke in the final, 9–1, to win their tenth national title. Coached by Anson Dorrance, the Tar Heels again finished the season undefeated, 25–0. This would go on to become the seventh of North Carolina's record nine consecutive national titles (1986–1994).

The most outstanding offensive player was Mia Hamm from North Carolina, and the most outstanding defensive player was Sue Wall, from Santa Clara. Hamm was also the tournament's leading scorer (5 goals, 2 assists). An All-tournament team was named for the first time since 1983.

== Qualification ==
All Division I women's soccer programs were eligible to qualify for the tournament. The tournament field remained fixed at 12 teams.

Team	Appearance	Previous	Record
Connecticut	11th	1991	15–4–1
Duke	1st	Never	14–4–2
Hartford	4th	1991	18–1
Massachusetts	10th	1991	15–3
North Carolina	11th	1991	22–0
NC State	8th	1991	15–5–1
Portland	1st	Never	18–1
Santa Clara	4th	1991	11–4–2
SMU	2nd	1990	15–5
Stanford	3rd	1991	16–1–1
Virginia	6th	1991	14–4–1
William & Mary	8th	1990	15–3

== Bracket ==
First round
William & Mary	1
NC State	0
Stanford	5
Portland	2
Massachusetts (2OT)	2
Connecticut	1
Duke	1
SMU	0

Second round
North Carolina	7
William & Mary	0
Santa Clara	2
Stanford	0
Hartford	2
Massachusetts	1
Virginia	0
Duke	2

Semifinals
North Carolina	3
Santa Clara	0
Hartford	0
Duke	1

Championship (Women's College Cup); Chapel Hill, North Carolina
North Carolina	9
Duke	1

== All-tournament team ==
- Mia Hamm, North Carolina (most outstanding offensive player)
- Angela Kelly, North Carolina
- Nancy Kramarz, Hartford
- Amy Kroeger, Santa Clara
- Jennifer Lewis, Duke
- Kristine Lilly, North Carolina
- Heidi Mauger, Duke
- Meegan McMullin, Duke
- Keri Sanchez, North Carolina
- Carolyn Springer, North Carolina
- Rita Tower, North Carolina
- Tisha Venturini, North Carolina
- Sue Wall, Santa Clara (most outstanding defensive player)

== See also ==
- 1992 NCAA Division I men's soccer tournament
- 1992 NCAA Division II women's soccer tournament
- 1992 NCAA Division III women's soccer tournament
- 1992 NAIA women's soccer tournament
