= 2001 NCAA Division I women's soccer tournament =

2001 NCAA women's soccer tournament
Women's College Cup (semifinals & final)

Tournament details
- Country: United States
- Dates: November 15–December 7, 2001
- Teams: 64

Final positions
- Champions: Santa Clara Broncos (1st title, 8th College Cup)
- Runners-up: North Carolina Tar Heels (19th title match, 20th College Cup)
- Semifinalists: Florida Gators (2nd College Cup); Portland Pilots (6th College Cup)

Tournament statistics
- Matches played: 63
- Goals scored: 179 (2.84 per match)
- Attendance: 55,807 (886 per match)
- Top goal scorer(s): Abby Wambach, UF (5G, 4A)

Awards
- Best player: Aly Wagner, SCU (Offensive); Danielle Slaton, SCU (Defensive)

The 2001 NCAA Division I women's soccer tournament (also known as the 2001 Women's College Cup) was the 20th annual single-elimination tournament to determine the national champion of NCAA Division I women's collegiate soccer. The semifinals and championship game were played at Southern Methodist University's Gerald J. Ford Stadium in University Park, Texas from December 5–7, 2001.

Santa Clara defeated North Carolina in the final, 1–0, to win their first national title. The Broncos (23–2) were coached by Jerry Smith.

The most outstanding offensive player was Aly Wagner from Santa Clara, and the most outstanding defensive player was Danielle Slaton, also from Santa Clara. Wagner and Slaton, along with nine other players, were named to the All-Tournament team.

The tournament's leading scorer, with 5 goals and 4 assists, was Abby Wambach from Florida.

== Qualification ==
All Division I women's soccer programs were eligible to qualify for the tournament. The tournament field expanded from 48 teams to its current size of 64 teams.

== Format ==
Just as before, the final two rounds, deemed the Women's College Cup, were played at a pre-determined neutral site. All other rounds were played on campus sites at the home field of the higher-seeded team. The only exceptions were the first two rounds, which were played at regional campus sites. The top sixteen teams, only eight of which were actually seeded, hosted four teams at their home fields during the tournament's first weekend.

=== National seeds ===
1. North Carolina
2. Santa Clara
3. UCLA
4. Portland
5. Stanford
6. Florida
7. Notre Dame
8. Connecticut

=== Teams ===
North Carolina Regional
Seed	School	Conference	Berth Type	Record
	Boston U.	America East	Automatic	14-5-1
	Bucknell	Patriot	Automatic	12-6
8	Connecticut	Big East	At-large	16-5
	Duke	ACC	At-large	08-9
	Hartford	America East	At-large	15-5
	Harvard	Ivy League	At-large	10-5
	Loyola (MD)	MAAC	Automatic	09-8-2
1	North Carolina	ACC	Automatic	19-0
	Penn	Ivy League	Auto (shared)	13-1-3
	Penn State	Big Ten	Automatic	18-3-1
	Princeton	Ivy League	Auto (shared)	13-2-2
	Rutgers	Big East	At-large	12-7-1
	Sacred Heart	Northeast	Automatic	10-9
	Tennessee	SEC	At-large	11-6
	UNC Greensboro	Southern	Automatic	15-7
	Villanova	Big East	At-large	12-5-3

UCLA Regional
Seed	School	Conference	Berth Type	Record
	Auburn	SEC	At-large	11-7-1
	Cal State Fullerton	Big West	Automatic	13-6
	Clemson	ACC	At-large	13-4-1
	Dayton	Atlantic 10	Automatic	13-4
6	Florida	SEC	Automatic	17-3-1
	Florida State	ACC	At-large	14-7-1
	Georgia	SEC	At-large	12-5-1
	Kentucky	SEC	At-large	12-7-1
	Maryland	ACC	At-large	10-6-2
	Miami (FL)	Big East	At-large	10-8-1
	Miami (OH)	MAC	Automatic	14-6-1
	Pepperdine	West Coast	At-large	11-4-3
	UCF	Atlantic Sun	Automatic	14-5
3	UCLA	Pac-10	Automatic	17-2
	USC	Pac-10	At-large	10-6-2
	West Virginia	Big East	At-large	15-4-1

Portland Regional
Seed	School	Conference	Berth Type	Record
	Boston College	Big East	At-large	11-9-1
	BYU	Mountain West	Automatic	13-6-1
	California	Pac-10	At-large	12-6-2
	Denver	Sun Belt	Automatic	16-2-2
	Idaho State	Big Sky	Automatic	11-6-2
	Kansas	Big 12	At-large	13-7
	Nebraska	Big 12	At-large	15-4-1
4	Portland	West Coast	At-large	16-3
	Saint Mary's	West Coast	At-large	13-2-2
	San Diego	West Coast	At-large	14-5
	SMU	WAC	Automatic	15-3
	Southwest Texas State	Southland	Automatic	14-6
5	Stanford	Pac-10	At-large	13-3-2
	Texas	Big 12	At-large	14-5
	Texas A&M	Big 12	Automatic	14-3-1
	Washington	Pac-10	At-large	12-4-2

Santa Clara Regional
Seed	School	Conference	Berth Type	Record
	Cincinnati	Conference USA	Automatic	18-3
	Dartmouth	Ivy League	Auto (shared)	09-4-1
	Eastern Illinois	Ohio Valley	Automatic	14-4
	Evansville	Missouri Valley	Automatic	13-6-1
	Illinois	Big Ten	At-large	12-7-1
	Liberty	Big South	Automatic	11-7-2
	Marquette	Conference USA	At-large	16-5
	Michigan	Big Ten	At-large	12-7-1
	Milwaukee	Horizon League	Automatic	15-3
7	Notre Dame	Big East	Automatic	16-2-1
	Oakland	Mid-Continent	Automatic	16-3-1
2	Santa Clara	West Coast	Automatic	17-2
	Syracuse	Big East	At-large	11-6
	Virginia	ACC	At-large	14-3-2
	Wake Forest	ACC	At-large	09-8-2
	William & Mary	CAA	Automatic	10-8-1

== Bracket ==
=== Chapel Hill Bracket ===
First round November 15–16; Regional Campus Sites
1	North Carolina	3
UNC Greensboro	0
Chapel Hill, NC
Duke	1(4)
Tennessee	1(2)
Princeton	3
Loyola–Maryland	1
Princeton, NJ
Rutgers	4
Boston University	1
Penn State	3
Bucknell	1
State College, PA
Villanova	2
Penn	0
Harvard (4OT)	1
Hartford	0
Storrs, CT
8	Connecticut	3
Sacred Heart	0

Second round November 17–18; Regional Campus Sites
1	North Carolina	2
Duke	0
Princeton	0
Rutgers	1
Penn State	3
Villanova	0
Harvard	0
8	Connecticut	1

Third Round; November 23–25; Campus Sites
1	North Carolina	2
Rutgers	1
Penn State	2
8	Connecticut*	0

Quarterfinals; November 30–December 2 Campus Sites
1	North Carolina	2
Penn State	1

=== Portland Bracket ===
First round November 15–16; Regional Campus Sites
5	Stanford	2
Denver	0
Palo Alto, CA
Saint Mary's (CA)	3
California	2
Texas A&M	3
Southwest Texas State	0
College Station, TX
Texas	1
SMU	2
Nebraska	5
Boston College	0
Lincoln, NE
BYU	1
Kansas	0
Washington	2
San Diego	0
Portland, OR
4	Portland	5
Idaho State	0

Second round November 17–18; Regional Campus Sites
5	Stanford	3
Saint Mary's (CA)	1
Texas A&M (OT)	2
SMU	1
Nebraska	3
BYU	0
Washington	0
4	Portland	2

Third Round; November 23–25; Campus Sites
5	Stanford*	0
Texas A&M	1
Nebraska	0
4	Portland*	4

Quarterfinals; November 30–December 2 Campus Sites
Texas A&M	1
4	Portland*	4

=== Los Angeles Bracket ===
First round November 15–16; Regional Campus Sites
3	UCLA	3
Cal State Fullerton	0
Los Angeles, CA
USC	0
Pepperdine	1
West Virginia	0
Miami (OH)	1
Morgantown, WV
Maryland	0
Dayton	1
Clemson (OT)	1
Kentucky	0
Clemson, SC
Florida State	1
Auburn	0
Georgia	5
Miami (FL)	2
Gainesville, FL
6	Florida	4
Central Florida	0

Second round November 17–18; Regional Campus Sites
3	UCLA	2
Pepperdine	1
Miami (OH)	0
Dayton	2
Clemson	1
Florida State	0
Georgia	0
6	Florida	3

Third Round; November 23–25; Campus Sites
3	UCLA*	3
Dayton	1
Clemson	1
6	Florida*	3

Quarterfinals; November 30–December 2 Campus Sites
3	UCLA*	0
6	Florida (2OT)	1

=== Santa Clara Bracket ===
First round November 15–16; Regional Campus Sites
7	Notre Dame	2
Eastern Illinois	0
South Bend, IN
Cincinnati	3
Oakland	2
Virginia	3
Liberty	0
Charlottesville, VA
Wake Forest	1
William & Mary (2OT)	2
Marquette	0
Michigan	1
Milwaukee, WI
Wisconsin–Milwaukee	0
Dartmouth	1
Illinois	0
Syracuse	1
Champaign, IL
2	Santa Clara	3
Evansville	0

Second round November 17–18; Regional Campus Sites
7	Notre Dame	2
Cincinnati	3
Virginia	4
William & Mary	1
Michigan	0
Dartmouth	1
Syracuse	1
2	Santa Clara	4

Third Round; November 23–25; Campus Sites
Cincinnati	0
Virginia*	4
Dartmouth	0
2	Santa Clara*	2

Quarterfinals; November 30–December 2 Campus Sites
Virginia	2
2	Santa Clara*	3

=== College Cup ===
Semifinals; December 7 Gerald J. Ford Stadium; University Park, Texas
1	North Carolina	2
4	Portland	1
6	Florida	2
2	Santa Clara (2OT)	3

Championship; December 9 Gerald J. Ford Stadium; University Park, Texas
1	North Carolina	0
2	Santa Clara	1

== All-tournament team ==
- Jessica Ballweg, Santa Clara
- Jordan Kellgren, Florida
- Jena Kluegel, North Carolina
- Anna Kraus, Santa Clara
- Leslie Osborne, Santa Clara
- Sara Randolph, North Carolina
- Catherine Reddick, North Carolina
- Anne Remy, North Carolina
- Danielle Slaton, Santa Clara (most outstanding defensive player)
- Aly Wagner, Santa Clara (most outstanding offensive player)
- Veronica Zepeda, Santa Clara

== See also ==
- NCAA Women's Soccer Championships (Division II, Division III)
- NCAA Men's Soccer Championships (Division I, Division II, Division III)
