= 1988 NCAA Division II women's soccer tournament =

Tournament details
- Country: United States
- Teams: 4

Final positions
- Champions: Cal State Hayward Pioneers (1st title, 1st title match)
- Runners-up: Barry Buccaneers (1st title match)

Tournament statistics
- Matches played: 3
- Goals scored: 10 (3.33 per match)
- Top goal scorer(s): Denise Butticci, Cal State Hayward (3 goals, 1 assist)

Awards
- Best player: Denise Butticci, Cal State Hayward

The 1988 NCAA Division II women's soccer tournament was the first annual NCAA-sponsored tournament to determine the team national champion of Division II women's college soccer in the United States.

The championship of the inaugural event was played at Barry University in Miami Shores, Florida.

Cal State Hayward defeated hosts Barry in the final, 1–0, to claim their first national title.

== Qualified teams ==
- Four programs qualified for the inaugural Division II tournament.

Team	Appearance
Barry	1st
Cal State Hayward	1st
Keene State	1st
Mercyhurst	1st

== Bracket ==
Semifinals; Campus sites
Barry	2
Keene State	1
Cal State Hayward	6
Mercyhurst	0

Championship; Miami Shores, FL
Barry	0
Cal State Hayward	1

== See also ==
- 1988 NCAA Division I Women's Soccer Tournament
- NCAA Division III Women's Soccer Championship
- 1988 NCAA Division I Men's Soccer Tournament
- NAIA Women's Soccer Championship
