= Zola Springer =

American soccer player (born 1972)

Personal information
- Full name: N. Zola Solamente
- Birth name: Carolyn Anne Springer
- Date of birth: September 21, 1972 (age 54)
- Place of birth: Silver Spring, Maryland, U.S.
- Height: 5 ft 4 in (1.63 m)
- Position: Defender

Youth career
- –1990: St. Andrew's Lions

College career
Years	Team	Apps	(Gls)
1990–1993	North Carolina Tar Heels	94	(8)

Senior career*
Years	Team	Apps	(Gls)
1998	Raleigh Wings	8	(0)

International career
1992–1993	United States	9	(0)
- * Club domestic league appearances and goals

N. Zola Solamente (born Carolyn Anne Springer; September 21, 1972) is an American former soccer player who played as a defender, making nine appearances for the United States women's national team.

== Career ==
Springer played for St. Andrew's Lions in middle and high school. She also played basketball and ran track in high school. In college, she played for the North Carolina Tar Heels from 1990 to 1993, winning the NCAA championship in all four seasons. She was an All-American in 1993, being included in the Soccer News first team and NSCAA second team. She was also included in the All-ACC Selection from 1991 to 1993, the ACC All-Tournament Selection in 1993, and was included in the NCAA All-Tournament Team in 1990, 1992, and 1993. In total, she scored 8 goals and recorded 9 assists in 94 appearances for the Tar Heels.

Springer made her international debut for the United States on August 14, 1992 in a friendly match against Norway. In total, she made nine appearances for the U.S., earning her final cap on July 17, 1993 in a friendly match against China PR. She also participated in the 1995 U.S. Olympic Festival in Denver.

In 2014, Springer began to travel the world to coach youth soccer as a sports envoy for the Sports Diplomacy Office of the U.S. State Department. As an envoy, she has traveled to Albania, Bahrain, Belarus, Bolivia, Jordan, Senegal, Tajikistan, and The Netherlands. She also provides youth soccer clinics in the greater Boston area. In 2016, she was inducted into the St. Andrew's Athletic Hall of Fame.

== Personal life ==
Springer is a native of Silver Spring, Maryland. She was born as Carolyn Springer, and was nicknamed as "Ntozake Zola", though she changed her name to "N. Zola Solamente". She later worked as a painter and director of art gallery in Boston, and has a daughter.

== Career statistics ==
=== International ===
United States
Year	Apps	Goals
1992	1	0
1993	8	0
Total	9	0
