= 2015 NCAA Division III women's soccer tournament =

2015 NCAA Division III Women's Soccer Championship
Tournament details
- Country: United States
- Dates: December 4–5, 2015
- Teams: 64

Tournament statistics
- Matches played: 63
- All statistics correct as of 11/12/2015.

The 2015 NCAA Division III Women's Soccer Championship is the 30th annual single-elimination tournament to determine the national champion of NCAA Division III women's collegiate soccer in the United States. The semifinals and championship game were played at Swope Soccer Village in Kansas City, Missouri (the home field of Swope Park Rangers, the USL affiliate of MLS's Sporting Kansas City) from December 4–5, 2015 while the preceding rounds were played at various sites across the country during November 2015.

== Qualification ==
All Division III women's soccer programs were eligible to qualify for the 64-team tournament field. 44 teams received automatic bids by winning their conference tournaments and an additional 20 teams earned at-large bids based on their regular season records. ALl first and second-round games are played on campus sites while all third and fourth-round games, deemed Sectionals, were played on the home field of the highest-seeded remaining team of that sectional.

=== Automatic qualifiers (44) ===
Conference	Champion	Record
Allegheny Mountain	Penn State–Behrend	16–2–2
American Southwest	Hardin–Simmons	17–2–1
Capital Athletic	York (PA)	9–10
Centennial	Johns Hopkins	13–4–1
CUNYAC	Staten Island	12–4–1
CCIW	Wheaton (IL)	15–6
Colonial States	Cabrini	11–5–3
Commonwealth Coast	Roger Williams	19–0–3
Empire 8	Stevens Tech	16–3–1
Great Northeast	Lasell	13–4–4
Great South	UC Santa Cruz	5–10–2
HCAC	Hanover	15–5
IIAC	Wartburg	14–4–2
Landmark	Catholic	16–2
Liberty League	William Smith	16–1–1
Little East	Western Connecticut State	16–5–1
MSCAC	Westfield State	10–6–3
MIAA	Calvin	18–2–2
MAC Commonwealth	Messiah	17–0–2
MAC Freedom	DeSales	14–5
Midwest	Carroll (WI)	15–4–1
MIAC	Gustavus Adolphus	13–6–1
NECC	Lesley	16–5
NESCAC	Williams	16–1–1
NEWMAC	Springfield	11–5–5
NJAC	Rowan	13–2–2
North Atlantic	Colby-Sawyer	13–3–2
North Coast	DePauw	12–6–1
NEAC	Penn State–Berks	16–2–2
NACC	Milwaukee Engineering	15–6
Northwest	Puget Sound	16–0–4
Ohio Athletic	Capital	14–4–1
ODAC	Lynchburg	19–2–1
Presidents	Thomas More	17–0–2
SLIAC	Westminster (MO)	10–6–2
Skyline	St. Joseph's (Long Island)	9–9–2
SAA	Centre	16–1–1
SCIAC	Pomona-Pitzer	11–8–1
SCAC	Trinity (TX)	18–0–1
SUNYAC	SUNY Oneonta	14–3–2
UAA	Washington–St. Louis	16–2
Upper Midwest	St. Scholastica	12–6–2
USA South	Piedmont	20–1–1
WIAC	Wisconsin–Whitewater	17–4

=== At-large qualifiers (20) ===
Team	Conference	Record
Amherst	NESCAC	10–3–2
Augustana (IL)	CCIW	15–4–1
Babson	NEWMAC	14–3–4
Bowdoin	NESCAC	12–5–1
Brandeis	UAA	14–2–3
Carnegie Mellon	UAA	15–1–1
Chicago	UAA	12–6
Denison	NCAC	15–4
Illinois Wesleyan	CCIW	18–2
Ithaca	Empire 8	13–4–2
McDaniel	Centennial	15–2–2
Misericordia	MAC Freedom	15–3–2
Montclair State	NJAC	14–3–2
TCNJ	NJAC	12–3–4
St. Lawrence	Liberty	13–4–2
Sewanee	SAA	11–3–3
Swarthmore	Centennial	16–1–1
Texas–Tyler	ASC	17–1–1
Wisconsin–La Crosse	WIAC	12–6–2
Wisconsin–Oshkosh	WIAC	14–4–2

== Tournament bracket ==
=== Messiah Sectional ===
First Round; November 13–15, 2015; Campus sites
Messiah*	6
Staten Island	0
Montclair State	3
Springfield	0
Rowan*	2
Lasell	0
Babson	0
Lynchburg	1
Trinity (TX)* (2OT, PK)	1
Texas–Tyler	1
Hardin–Simmons	3
UC Santa Cruz	1
Swarthmore*	5
St. Joseph's (NY)	2
Ithaca	0
Catholic	1

Second Round; November 13–15, 2015; Campus sites
Messiah*	3
Montclair State	0
Rowan*	1
Lynchburg	0
Trinity (TX)	0
Hardin–Simmons*	2
Swarthmore*	1
Catholic	0

Sectionals; November 20–22, 2015; Grantham
Messiah*	3
Rowan	0
Hardin–Simmons	1
Swarthmore	1

Sectionals; November 20–22, 2015; Grantham
Messiah*	5
Swarthmore	0

=== Washington–St. Louis Sectional ===
First Round; November 13–15, 2015; Campus sites
Washington–St. Louis	4
York (PA)	0
Denison*	1
DeSales	0
Wartburg	1
St. Scholastica	0
Augustana (IL)*	0
Puget Sound	2
UW–Whitewater*	1
Carroll (WI)	0
Wheaton (IL)	2
Gustavus Adolphus	1
Illinois Wesleyan*	7
Westminster (MO)	0
UW–La Crosse	0
Pomona–Pitzer	3

Second Round; November 13–15, 2015; Campus sites
Washington–St. Louis	1
Denison*	0
Wartburg*	0
Puget Sound	0
UW–Whitewater	2
Wheaton (IL)	0
Illinois Wesleyan*	1
Pomona-Pitzer	0

Sectionals; November 20–22, 2015; St. Louis
Washington–St. Louis*	1
Wartburg	0
UW–Whitewater*	2
Illinois Wesleyan	1

Sectionals; November 20–22, 2015; St. Louis
Washington–St. Louis*	1
UW–Whitewater	0

=== Carnegie Mellon Sectional ===
First Round; November 13–15, 2015; Campus sites
Carnegie Mellon*	5
Cabrini	0
McDaniel	1
SUNY Oneonta	3
Calvin*	3
Milwaukee Engineering	2
DePauw (2OT, PK)	1
UW–Oshkosh	1
Centre*	3
Penn State Behrend	1
Hanover	0
Capital	1
Thomas More*	5
Piedmont	1
Sewanee	0
Chicago	3

Second Round; November 13–15, 2015; Campus sites
Carnegie Mellon*	1
SUNY Oneonta	0
Calvin	1
DePauw	0
Centre*	4
Capital	0
Thomas More*	1
Chicago	0

Sectionals; November 20–22, 2015; Pittsburgh
Carnegie Mellon*	0
Calvin	1
Centre	1
Thomas More	0

Sectionals; November 20–22, 2015; Pittsburgh
Calvin	0
Centre	4

=== William Smith Sectional ===
First Round; November 13–15, 2015; Campus sites
William Smith*	3
Penn State Berks	0
Roger Williams	2
Misericordia	1
Amherst*	1
Colby-Sawyer	0
Brandeis	1
W. Connecticut	0
Williams*	3
Westfield State	0
St. Lawrence	1
TCNJ	4
Stevens Tech*	5
Lesley	0
Bowdoin	3
Johns Hopkins	2

Second Round; November 13–15, 2015; Campus sites
William Smith*	5
Roger Williams	1
Amherst*	1
Brandeis	1
Williams*	3
TCNJ	0
Stevens Tech*	4
Bowdoin	1

Sectionals; November 20–22, 2015; Geneva
William Smith*	1
Brandeis	0
Williams	2
Stevens Tech	1

Sectionals; November 20–22, 2015; Geneva
William Smith*	1
Williams (2OT, PK)	1

=== Division III Women's College Cup ===
Semifinals; December 4, 2015; Swope Soccer Village; Kansas City, Missouri
Messiah	1
WashU (2OT, PK)	1
Centre	1
Williams	2

Championship; December 5, 2015; Swope Soccer Village; Kansas City, Missouri
WashU	0
Williams	1

== See also ==
- NCAA Women's Soccer Championships (Division I, Division II)
- NCAA Men's Soccer Championships (Division I, Division II, Division II)
