= 1989 NCAA Division II women's soccer tournament =

Tournament details
- Country: United States
- Teams: 4

Final positions
- Champions: Barry Buccaneers (1st title, 2nd title match)
- Runners-up: Keene State Owls (1st title match)

Tournament statistics
- Matches played: 3
- Goals scored: 8 (2.67 per match)
- Top goal scorer(s): Kylene Carter, Barry (3 goals, 0 assists)

Awards
- Best player: Offense: Kylene Carter, Barry; Defense: Carilynn Hormilla, Barry

The 1989 NCAA Division II women's soccer tournament was the second annual NCAA-sponsored tournament to determine the team national champion of Division II women's college soccer in the United States.

The championship was hosted at Barry University in Miami Shores, Florida.

Hosts Barry defeated Keene State in the final, 4–0, to claim their first national title.

== Qualified teams ==
Team	Appearance	Previous
Adelphi	1st	—
Barry	2nd	1988
Cal State Dominguez Hills	1st	—
Keene State	2nd	1988

== Bracket ==
Semifinals
Keene State	1
Cal State Dominguez Hills	0
Barry	4
Adelphi	0

Championship
Keene State	0
Barry	4

== See also ==
- 1989 NCAA Division I Women's Soccer Tournament
- NCAA Division III Women's Soccer Championship
- 1989 NCAA Division II Men's Soccer Championship
- NAIA Women's Soccer Championship
