= Patty Irizarry =

American soccer player (born 1965)

Personal information
- Full name: Patricia Ann Irizarry
- Date of birth: February 8, 1965 (age 61)
- Place of birth: Richardson, Texas, U.S.
- Height: 5 ft 7 in (1.70 m)
- Position: Defender

Youth career
- 1974: Dartmouth Darts
- 1975: Dartmouth Dolls
- 1976: Sparta Soccer Club
- 1979–1983: Richardson Sting

International career
Years	Team	Apps	(Gls)
1987–1988	United States	2	(0)

Patricia Ann Irizarry (born February 8, 1965) is an American former soccer player who played as a defender, making two appearances for the United States women's national team.

== Career ==
She played youth soccer for the Dartmouth Darts, the Dartmouth Dolls, Sparta Soccer Club, and the Richardson Sting of Richardson, Texas. She also played volleyball for the Richardson Junior High Falcons in 1979.

Irizarry made her international debut for the United States on July 7, 1987, in a friendly match against Canada. She earned her second and final cap for the U.S. on July 29, 1988, in a friendly match against France. In 1987, she also participated at the U.S. Olympic Festival in Durham, North Carolina, playing for the Olympic South women's soccer team.

== Personal life ==
Irizarry is a native of Richardson, Texas, and attended Lloyd V. Berkner High School. She attended Texas A&M University before later going to the North Texas State University, where she received a Bachelor of Business Administration in 1987. She later received a Bachelor of Science in Nursing from the University of Texas at Arlington in 1995, and a Master of Science in Nursing from Texas Woman's University in 2002. She currently works as a nurse practitioner.

== Career statistics ==
=== International ===
United States
Year	Apps	Goals
1987	1	0
1988	1	0
Total	2	0
