= Chris Tomek =

American soccer player (born 1964)

Personal information
- Date of birth: May 19, 1964 (age 62)
- Place of birth: United States
- Position: Midfielder

Youth career
- –1981: Wheaton Central Tigers

College career
Years	Team	Apps	(Gls)
1985–1986	George Mason Patriots		

International career
1986–1987	United States	12	(0)

Managerial career
- 1994–200?: DGN Trojans Boys
- DGN Trojans
- 2014: DGN Trojans Boys' JV (assistant)
- DGN Trojans (assistant)

Christine Tomek (born May 19, 1964) is an American, former collegiate soccer and softball player originally from Wheaton, Illinois. She played for two college programs: the Iowa Hawkeyes 1983-84 and George Mason Patriots in 1985-86 and for softball she was an outfielder, earning All-Big Ten Conference honors. She played as a midfielder in soccer, making twelve appearances for the United States women's national team.

== Career ==
In high school, Tomek attended Wheaton Warrenville South High School where she played for the Tiger boys' team until 1982. She was the first woman to score in boys' varsity soccer in IHSA history. She was included in the All-Conference selection in 1979, 1980, and 1981, as well as the All-State team in 1981. There she also played basketball, where she was named to the All-Conference team in 1980 and 1981, and softball, where she was named to the All-State team in 1980, 1981, and 1982. In college, she first played softball for the Iowa Hawkeyes from 1983 to 1984, where she was a letterwinner and was selected to the Second Team All-Big Ten in 1984. She later attended George Mason University, where she played soccer for the Patriots from 1985 to 1986. There she helped the team win the 1985 NCAA Women's Soccer Tournament. In 1986 she was the team captain, and was chosen as an NSCAA Second-Team All-American. She also was selected in the NSCAA All-Region team in 1985 and 1986, and was an Adidas Academic All-American in 1986. She was inducted into the Wheaton Central Tigers Hall of Fame in 2009.

Tomek made her international debut for the United States on July 7, 1986, in the 1986 North American Cup friendly tournament against Canada. In total, she made twelve appearances for the U.S., earning her final cap on December 19, 1987, in a friendly match against Canada.

She later worked at Downers Grove North High School, where she has coached various soccer teams of the Trojans. Her coaching rules at the school included the head coach of the boys' team from 1994 until the 2000s, as well as the girls' team. She was an assistant coach for the boys' junior varsity team in 2014, and currently works as the varsity girls assistant. Tomek is the only woman to have been inducted into the Illinois High School Soccer Coaches Association Hall of Fame.

== Career statistics ==
Iowa Hawkeyes & George Mason Patriots
YEAR	G	AB	R	H	BA	RBI	HR	3B	2B	TB	SLG	BB	SO	SB	SBA
1984	48	147	24	42	.285	19	2	3	3	57	.388%	8	25	5	5
1986	48	153	32	58	.379	38	4	8	10	96	.627%	8	12	5	7
TOTALS	96	300	56	100	.333	57	6	11	13	153	.510%	16	37	10	12

=== International ===
United States
Year	Apps	Goals
1986	7	0
1987	5	0
Total	12	0

== Honors ==
United States

- 1986 North American Cup
