= 1991 NCAA Division I women's soccer tournament =

1991 NCAA women's soccer tournament
Women's College Cup (semifinals & final)

Tournament details
- Country: United States
- Dates: November–December 1991
- Teams: 12

Final positions
- Champions: North Carolina Tar Heels (9th title, 10th College Cup)
- Runners-up: Wisconsin Badgers (1st title match, 2nd College Cup)
- Semifinalists: Colorado College Tigers (5th College Cup); Virginia Cavaliers (1st College Cup)

Tournament statistics
- Matches played: 11
- Goals scored: 32 (2.91 per match)
- Attendance: 12,004 (1,091 per match)
- Top goal scorer(s): Pam Kalinoski, UNC (3)

Awards
- Best player: Pam Kalinoski, UNC (Offensive); Tisha Venturini, UNC (Defensive)
- All statistics correct as of 5/7/2015.

The 1991 NCAA Division I women's soccer tournament was the 10th annual single-elimination tournament to determine the national champion of NCAA Division I women's collegiate soccer. The championship game was played at Fetzer Field in Chapel Hill, North Carolina during December 1991.

North Carolina defeated Wisconsin Badgers in the final, 3–1, to win their ninth national title. Coached by Anson Dorrance, the Tar Heels again finished the season undefeated, 25–0. This would go on to become the sixth of North Carolina's record nine consecutive national titles (1986–1994). It also comprised the Tar Heels' ten-year unbeaten streak that ran from the 1984 final all the way until the 1994 season.

The most outstanding offensive player was again Pam Kalinoski from North Carolina, and the most outstanding defensive player was Tisha Venturini, also from North Carolina. Kalinoski was also the tournament's leading scorer (3 goals, 3 assists).

== Qualification ==
All Division I women's soccer programs were eligible to qualify for the tournament. The tournament field remained fixed at 12 teams.

Team	Appearance	Previous	Record
UC Santa Barbara	8th	1990	12-6
Central Florida	5th	1988	10-4-1
Colorado College	8th	1990	16-2
Connecticut	10th	1990	15-4
Hartford	3rd	1990	13-6
Massachusetts	9th	1989	14-4
North Carolina	10th	1990	21-0
NC State	7th	1990	17-4
Santa Clara	3rd	1990	10-5
Stanford	2nd	1990	16-1
Virginia	5th	1990	13-4-3
Wisconsin	5th	1990	15-2

== Bracket ==
First round
NC State	4
Central Florida	0
Connecticut	1
Massachusetts	0
Hartford	4
UC Santa Barbara	0
Stanford (OT)	2
Santa Clara	1

Second round
North Carolina	4
NC State	1
Virginia	2
Connecticut	0
Wisconsin	1
Hartford	0
Colorado College (3OT)	1
Stanford	0

Semifinals
North Carolina	5
Virginia	1
Wisconsin	1
Colorado College	0

Championship (Women's College Cup); Chapel Hill, North Carolina
North Carolina	3
Wisconsin	1

== See also ==
- 1991 NCAA Division I men's soccer tournament
- 1991 NCAA Division II women's soccer tournament
- 1991 NCAA Division III women's soccer tournament
- 1991 NAIA women's soccer tournament
