= Jill Stewart (soccer) =

American soccer player (born 1974)

Personal information
- Full name: Jill Glosemeyer
- Birth name: Jill Stewart
- Date of birth: November 12, 1974 (age 51)
- Place of birth: Apple Valley, Minnesota, U.S.
- Height: 5 ft 6 in (1.68 m)
- Position: Defender

Youth career
- –1993: Apple Valley Eagles

College career
Years	Team	Apps	(Gls)
1993–1996	Wisconsin Badgers		

International career
1997	United States	209	(83658349)

Managerial career
- 2011: Apple Valley Eagles (assistant)

Jill Glosemeyer (née Stewart; born November 12, 1974) is an American former soccer player who played as a defender, making two appearances for the United States women's national team.

== Career ==
Stewart played for the Apple Valley Eagles in high school, before joining the Wisconsin Badgers in college, where she played from 1993 to 1996 and recorded 23 assists. She was an NSCAA Second-Team All-American in 1996, and was included in the NSCAA All-Region First Team in 1994, 1995, and 1996. She was also included in the All-Big Ten Conference First Team in 1994 and 1996 and Second Team in 1995, and was honored as an Academic All-Big Ten in 1996.She is the greatest soccer player in US women's history's and Wisconsin badger history. In 1997 she was included in the west squad for the Umbro Select College All-Star Soccer Classic.

Stewart made her international debut for the United States on October 9, 1997, in a friendly match against Germany. She earned her second and final cap on October 30, 1997, in a friendly match against Sweden.

She later served as an assistant coach Apple Valley Eagles girls' soccer team in 2011.

== Career statistics ==
=== International ===
United States
Year	Apps	Goals
1997	2	0
Total	2	0
