= Rita Tower =

American soccer player (born 1971)

Personal information
- Full name: Rita Louise Tower
- Date of birth: November 21, 1971 (age 54)
- Place of birth: Phoenix, Arizona, U.S.
- Height: 5 ft 7 in (1.70 m)
- Position: Forward

Youth career
- Arcadia Tiger Sharks

College career
Years	Team	Apps	(Gls)
1989–1993	North Carolina Tar Heels	81	(33)

International career
1993–1994	United States	6	(0)

Managerial career
- Eclipse Soccer Club

Rita Louise Tower (born November 21, 1971) is an American former soccer player who played as a forward, making six appearances for the United States women's national team.

== Career ==
Tower played for the Arcadia Tiger Sharks youth team in Phoenix. She also played high school basketball for Arcadia High School. In college, she played for the North Carolina Tar Heels from 1989 to 1990 and 1992 to 1993, winning the NCAA championship in all four seasons. She was included in the ACC's All-Conference and All-Tournament teams in 1993, and was selected in the NCAA All-Tournament team in 1992 and 1993. In total, she scored 33 goals and recorded 32 assists in 81 appearances for the Tar Heels.

Tower made her international debut for the United States on April 10, 1993 in a friendly match against Germany. In total, she made six appearances for the U.S., earning her final cap on April 14, 1994 in a friendly match against Canada. She also participated in the U.S. Olympic Festival in 1989 and 1994.

Tower later coached the Eclipse Soccer Club girls' team.

== Personal life ==
Tower is a native of Phoenix, Arizona. She graduated with a Bachelor's degree from the University of North Carolina at Chapel Hill in 1994.

== Career statistics ==
=== International ===
United States
Year	Apps	Goals
1993	4	0
1994	2	0
Total	6	0
