= Kristen Weiss =

American soccer player (born 1984)

Personal information
- Full name: Kristen Michelle Weiss
- Date of birth: May 11, 1984 (age 42)
- Place of birth: Fairview Park, Ohio, U.S.
- Height: 5 ft 3 in (1.60 m)
- Position: Forward

Youth career
- Internationals Soccer Club
- –2002: Walsh Jesuit Warriors

College career
Years	Team	Apps	(Gls)
2002–2006	Virginia Cavaliers	45	(10)

International career
- United States U16
- United States U17
- United States U19
2001	United States	4	(0)

Managerial career
- 2008–2010: Clemson Tigers (assistant)
- 2010–2012: Maryland Terrapins (assistant)
- 2012: Milwaukee Panthers (assistant)
- 2013–2016: Wisconsin Badgers (assistant)

Kristen Michelle Weiss (born May 11, 1984) is an American former soccer player who played as a forward, making four appearances for the United States women's national team.

== Career ==
Weiss played for the Walsh Jesuit Warriors in high school, where she was a two-time Parade High-School All-American and the NSCAA National Player of the Year in 2001. She helped the team to win two consecutive state championships as a junior and senior, and was twice the school's Female Athlete of the Year. She scored 138 goals and recorded 80 assists during her high school career, finishing as the top goalscorer in state history. She also played club soccer for Internationals Soccer Club. In college, she played for the Virginia from 2002 to 2006. She tore her ACL during her freshman year, ending the season prematurely, and another tear of the same ACL a year later forced her to miss the entire 2003 season, though she received a medical redshirt. She converted her penalty to help the team win the 2004 ACC Women's Soccer Tournament championship game, where she was subsequently named on the All-ACC Tournament Team. Her senior season was again cut short after a tear in her other ACL, forcing her to end her athletic career. In total, she scored 10 goals and recorded 10 assists in 45 appearances for the Cavaliers.

Weiss played for the under-16, under-17, and under-19 national teams. She made her international debut for the United States on March 7, 2001 in a friendly match against Italy. In total, she made four appearances for the U.S., earning her final cap on March 17, 2001 in the 2001 Algarve Cup against Norway.

From 2006 to 2008, Weiss worked as a women's soccer administrator at her alma mater Virginia. She later began coaching, working as an assistant for the Clemson Tigers from 2008 to 2010, the Maryland Terrapins from 2010 to 2012 as a volunteer, the Milwaukee Panthers in 2012, and the Wisconsin Badgers from 2013 to 2016. She holds a U.S. Soccer National "A" coaching license.

== Personal life ==
Weiss was born in Fairview Park, Ohio, though she grew up in Brecksville, Ohio.

== Career statistics ==
=== International ===
United States
Year	Apps	Goals
2000	4	0
Total	4	0
