= 1992 NCAA Division I men's soccer tournament =

1992 Men's College Cup

Tournament details
- Country: United States
- Venue(s): Richardson Stadium; Davidson, North Carolina
- Teams: 28

Final positions
- Champions: Virginia (3rd title)
- Runners-up: San Diego
- Semifinalists: Davidson; Duke

Tournament statistics
- Matches played: 27
- Goals scored: 82 (3.04 per match)
- Attendance: 52,191 (1,933 per match)
- Top goal scorer(s): Guillermo Jara, San Diego (3)

Awards
- Best player: Claudio Reyna, Virginia (offensive); Jeff Causey, Virginia (defensive)

The 1992 NCAA Division I men's soccer tournament was the 34th annual tournament organized by the National Collegiate Athletic Association to determine the national champion of men's collegiate soccer among its Division I members in the United States.

Defending champions Virginia defeated San Diego in the championship game, 2–0, to claim their second consecutive and third overall national title.

The final match was played on December 6 at Richardson Stadium on the campus of Davidson College in Davidson, North Carolina. All the other games were played at the home field of the higher seeded team.

== Qualifying ==
Four teams made their debut appearances in the NCAA Division I men's soccer tournament: Creighton, Davidson, St. John's (NY), and USC Coastal Carolina (Coastal Carolina).

== Bracket ==
First round
Adelphi	1
Penn State	2
Hartford	0
Seton Hall	2
St. John's (NY)	0
Dartmouth	1
Air Force	1
SMU	4
Bowling Green	1
Saint Louis	2
James Madison	0
Duke	3
West Virginia	0
William & Mary	2
Davidson (pen.)	2
UNC Charlotte	2
USC Coastal Carolina	2
South Carolina	0
Stanford	0
San Diego	3
Indiana	4
Evansville	1
Washington	2
Portland	1

Second round
Virginia (4OT)	4
Penn State	1
Seton Hall	3
Dartmouth	4
Creighton	0
SMU	1
Saint Louis	3
Duke	4
NC State	3
William & Mary	2
Davidson (pen.)	0
USC Coastal Carolina	0
UCLA	1
San Diego	2
Indiana	2
Washington	0

Quarterfinals
Virginia	3
Dartmouth	0
SMU	0
Duke (pen.)	0
NC State	0
Davidson (OT)	1
San Diego	2
Indiana	0

Semifinals
Virginia	3
Duke	0
Davidson	2
San Diego (OT)	3

Championship
Virginia	2
San Diego	0

== Final ==
December 6, 1992

Virginia	2–0	San Diego
B. Agoos; Imler	Report

Richardson Stadium, Davidson, NC
Attendance: 8,150

== See also ==
- 1992 NCAA Division I women's soccer tournament
- 1992 NCAA Division II men's soccer tournament
- 1992 NCAA Division III men's soccer tournament
- 1992 NAIA men's soccer tournament
