= 1993 NCAA Division I women's soccer tournament =

1993 NCAA women's soccer tournament
Women's College Cup (semifinals & final)

Tournament details
- Country: United States
- Dates: November–December 1993
- Teams: 16

Final positions
- Champions: North Carolina Tar Heels (11th title, 12th College Cup)
- Runners-up: George Mason Patriots (3rd title match, 4th College Cup)
- Semifinalists: UMass Minutewomen (6th College Cup); Stanford Cardinal (1st College Cup)

Tournament statistics
- Matches played: 15
- Goals scored: 46 (3.07 per match)
- Attendance: 17,419 (1,161 per match)
- Top goal scorer(s): Mia Hamm, UNC (6)

Awards
- Best player: Mia Hamm, UNC (Offensive); Skye Eddy, GMU (Defensive)
- All statistics correct as of 5/11/2015.

The 1993 NCAA Division I women's soccer tournament was the 12th annual single-elimination tournament to determine the national champion of NCAA Division I women's collegiate soccer. The championship game was played at Fetzer Field in Chapel Hill, North Carolina during December 1993.

North Carolina defeated George Mason (the last team to defeat the Tar Heels in a College Cup Final) in the final, 6–0, to win their eleventh national title. Coached by Anson Dorrance, the Tar Heels again finished the season undefeated, 23–0. This would go on to become the eighth of North Carolina's record nine consecutive national titles (1986–1994). It also comprised the Tar Heels' ten-year unbeaten streak that ran from the 1984 final all the way until the 1994 season.

The most outstanding offensive player was again Mia Hamm from North Carolina, and the most outstanding defensive player was Skye Eddy, from George Mason. Hamm was also the tournament's leading scorer (6 goals, 4 assists). Hamm and Eddy, along with ten other players, were named to the All-tournament team.

== Qualification ==
All Division I women's soccer programs were eligible to qualify for the tournament. For the first time since 1984, the tournament field expanded, increasing from 12 to 16 teams.

=== Teams ===
Seed	School	Conference	Berth Type	Record
	California	Pac-10	At-large	10–3–4
	Connecticut	Big East	At-large	16–5–1
	Dartmouth	Ivy League	Automatic	12–2–1
	Duke	ACC	At-large	12–6–2
	FIU	Trans America	Automatic	13–2–2
	George Mason	CAA	Auto (shared)	16–2–1
	Massachusetts	Atlantic 10	Automatic	16–2–3
	North Carolina	ACC	Automatic	19–0
	Notre Dame	Midwestern Collegiate	Automatic	19–2
	Portland	West Coast	At-large	15–3–1
	Providence	Big East	Automatic	10–8–2
	Santa Clara	West Coast	Automatic	15–4
	SMU	Independent	At-large	13–6–1
	Stanford	Pac-10	Automatic	16–2–1
	William & Mary	CAA	Auto (shared)	12–4–1
	Wisconsin	Independent	At-large	15–3

== Bracket ==
Regional semifinals
North Carolina	4
SMU	1
FIU (2OT, PK)	1(3)
Duke	1(2)
Connecticut	3
Dartmouth	1
Massachusetts	5
Providence	0
George Mason	2
Notre Dame	1
Wisconsin	1
William & Mary	0
Portland	2
Santa Clara	0
Stanford	2
California	0

Regional Finals
North Carolina	3
FIU	0
Connecticut	0
Massachusetts	1
George Mason	3
Wisconsin	1
Portland	0
Stanford	1

Semifinals
North Carolina	4
Massachusetts	1
George Mason (4OT, PK)	1(3)
Stanford	1(1)

Championship (Women's College Cup); Chapel Hill, North Carolina
North Carolina	6
George Mason	0

== All-tournament team ==
- Skye Eddy, George Mason (most outstanding defensive player)
- Danielle Egan, North Carolina
- Mia Hamm, North Carolina (most outstanding offensive player)
- Christine Ho, George Mason
- Angela Kelly, North Carolina
- Carmel Murphy, Stanford
- Tammy Pearman, George Mason
- Sarah Rafanelli, Stanford
- Nicole Roberts, Massachusetts
- Zola Springer, North Carolina
- Rita Tower, North Carolina
- Tisha Venturini, North Carolina

== See also ==
- 1993 NCAA Division I men's soccer tournament
- 1993 NCAA Division II women's soccer tournament
- 1993 NCAA Division III women's soccer tournament
- 1993 NAIA women's soccer tournament
