= Todd Schmitz =

American swimming coach (born 1978)

Todd Schmitz (born 1978) is an American swimming coach. He lives in Aurora, Colorado. He is the head coach of the Denver-area club team, the Colorado Stars, which is the training program of 17-year-old swimming phenomenon Missy Franklin, a 2012 U.S. Olympic Team member. Following the 2012 United States Olympic Trials, Schmitz was named to the 2012 U.S. Olympic women's swimming team as an assistant coach.

Schmitz is a native of North Dakota and a graduate of Metropolitan State University of Denver, where he swam for the now-defunct Metro State Roadrunners swim team. After graduation from Metro State, he worked as a junior executive with a national restaurant chain; he quit to accept a full-time job as the under-8 coach of the Colorado Stars, a club team with about 130 young swimmers. Missy Franklin was among his first class of age-group swimmers. With Franklin and his other swimmers, he has employed an atypical approach, emphasizing the need to avoid burnout, rather than pushing his young athletes' bodies to their physical limits as most other elite coaches do. "It's hard to argue with his success," said Gregg Troy, the head coach of the 2012 U.S. Olympic men's swim team.
