= Benjamin Ziemer =

American soccer manager

Personal information
- Place of birth: Sebastopol, California, United States

Team information
- Current team: Ethiopia U17 (manager)

College career
Years	Team	Apps	(Gls)
- Fresno State Bulldogs
- Santa Rosa Junior College
1990–1991	Sonoma State Seawolves		(6+)

Senior career*
Years	Team	Apps	(Gls)
- Westfalia Herne
- North Bay Breakers
- Juventus SC

Managerial career
- 2004–2011: Sonoma State Seawolves (assistant)
- 2007–2011: Sonoma County Sol
- 2012–2013: United States U14 (assistant)
- 2012–2014: United States U15 (assistant)
- 2018–2019: Sacramento Republic (assistant)
- 2022–2024: Sonoma State Seawolves (assistant)
- 2025–: Ethiopia U17
- * Club domestic league appearances and goals

Benjamin Ziemer is an American soccer manager and former player who is currently the head coach of the Ethiopia under-17 national team.

He is also the president of the NorCal Premier Soccer League, which is part of US Club Soccer.

== Early life and playing career ==
Born in Sebastopol, California, Zeimer went to Analy High School. Growing up, he supported the San Jose Earthquakes in the NASL.

In college, Zeimer represented the Fresno State Bulldogs and Santa Rosa Junior College in men's soccer, before transferring to Sonoma State University in 1990, where he played for the Seawolves. He, alongside his brothers, were part of the Seawolves team that reached the final of the 1991 NCAA Division II men's soccer tournament, where they lost to Florida Tech Panthers.

After leaving Sonoma State, he joined German fourth division side Westfalia Herne, where he played for two seasons. Following his time in Germany, he returned to the United States with North Bay Breakers and Juventus SC.

== Managerial career ==
Ziemer started as an assistant manager at the Sonoma State Seawolves, where he worked for seven years between 2004 and 2011. In 2007, he was also appointed the manager of Sonoma County Sol, where he helped them win the National Premier Soccer League play-offs in the 2009 season. Later on, he served as the assistant manager of the United States' under-14 and under-15 teams, under head coach Hugo Pérez, where he worked alongside players like Christian Pulisic, Haji Wright, Tyler Adams, and Jonathan González.

Afterwards, he worked as a coach for the academy of Sacramento Republic FC, where he was awarded the Development Academy West Conference U-18 Coach of the Year in 2016. He also worked as an assistant manager at the club between 2018 and 2019 under Simon Elliott. In 2022, he rejoined the Sonoma State Seawolves as an assistant manager.

In September 2025, Ziemer was appointed as the manager of the Ethiopia under-17 national team. He helped them qualify for the 2026 U-17 Africa Cup of Nations, their first since 2003, where they finished third in their group due to goals scored and lost a 2026 FIFA U-17 World Cup play-off match against Mozambique after a penalty shootout.

== Personal life ==
He has three brothers, Andrew, Christopher, and Marcus, who were all soccer players. Marcus died on March 18, 2026, at the age of 63, following a major head injury after he crashed while riding an electric scooter.

Ziemer cited Hugo Pérez, Peter Reynaud, and Dutch coach Frans Hoek as some of his coaching role models. In 2015, he was inducted into the Sonoma State University Athletics Hall of Fame.
