= 1992 NCAA Division II men's soccer tournament =

1992 NCAA Division II Men's Soccer Championship
Tournament details
- Country: United States
- Teams: 12

Final positions
- Champions: Southern Connecticut (3rd)
- Runners-up: Tampa

Tournament statistics
- Matches played: 11
- Goals scored: 39 (3.55 per match)
- Top goal scorer(s): (Jamaica) Altimont Butler, N.H. College (2)

The 1992 NCAA Division II Men's Soccer Championship was the 21st annual tournament held by the NCAA to determine the top men's Division II college soccer program in the United States.

Southern Connecticut (21-2-1) defeated Tampa, 1–0, to win a third national title. The Fighting Owls were coached by Ray Reid.

The final match was held in Tampa, Florida on December 5, 1992.

== Bracket ==
First Round; *Campus sites
USC Spartanburg	0
*	Florida Tech	4
*	Oakland	3
Chico State	1
*	N.H. College	5(OT)
Franklin Pierce	4
*	Cal State Los Angeles	3
Grand Canyon	2

Quarterfinals; *Campus sites
*	Tampa	2(OT)
Florida Tech	1
*	Lock Haven	0
Oakland	2
*	So. Connecticut	3(OT)
N.H. College	1
*	Seattle Pacific	1
Cal State Los Angeles	0

Semifinals; *Campus sites
*	Tampa	3
Oakland	1
So. Connecticut	1(5)
Seattle Pacific	1(4)

Final; December 5 Tampa, FL
Tampa	0
So. Connecticut	1

== Final ==
December 5, 1992

Tampa	0–1	Southern Connecticut
	Report	Rich Wisdom 18:23' (daSilva)

Pepin-Rood Stadium, Tampa, Florida
Attendance: 3,285

== See also ==
- 1992 NCAA Division II women's soccer tournament
- 1992 NCAA Division I men's soccer tournament
- 1992 NCAA Division III men's soccer tournament
- 1992 NAIA men's soccer tournament
