= 1991 NCAA Division II men's soccer tournament =

1991 NCAA Division II Men's Soccer Championship
Tournament details
- Country: United States
- Teams: 12

Final positions
- Champions: Florida Tech (2nd title)
- Runners-up: Sonoma State

Tournament statistics
- Matches played: 11
- Goals scored: 37 (3.36 per match)
- Top goal scorer(s): (United States) Andrew Ziemer, Sonoma State (6)

The 1991 NCAA Division II Men's Soccer Championship was the 20th annual tournament held by the NCAA to determine the top men's Division II college soccer program in the United States.

Florida Tech defeated Sonoma State, 5–1, to win a second national title. The Panthers (19–2–1) were coached by Rick Stottler.

The final match was held in Melbourne, Florida on December 7, 1991.

== Bracket ==
First Round; *Campus sites
*	Oakland	2(2)
Sonoma State	2(4)
*	CSU San Bernardino	0
Cal Poly–SLO	1
*	Tampa	2
USC Spartanburg	1
*	Keene State	2
Bridgeport	0

Quarterfinals; *Campus sites
UMSL	1
Sonoma State	3
Seattle Pacific	3
Cal Poly–SLO	3(PK)
*	Florida Tech	2
Tampa	1
*	Franklin Pierce	2
Keene State	1

Semifinals; *Campus sites
Sonoma State	1(5)
Cal Poly–SLO	1(4)
Florida Tech	2
Franklin Pierce	1

Final; December 7 Melbourne, FL
Sonoma State	1
Florida Tech	5

== Final ==
December 7, 1991

Florida Tech	5–1	Sonoma State
Colin Semwayo (30:09), 73'; Richard Sharpe (66:29), 68' (78:43)	Report	Ben Ziemer (11:28)

FIT Varsity Field, Melbourne, Florida
Attendance: 3,000

== See also ==
- 1991 NCAA Division II women's soccer tournament
- 1991 NCAA Division I men's soccer tournament
- 1991 NCAA Division III men's soccer tournament
- 1991 NAIA men's soccer tournament
