= Joan Dunlap-Seivold =

American soccer player (born 1961)

Personal information
- Full name: Joan Maria Dunlap-Seivold
- Birth name: Joan Maria Dunlap
- Date of birth: August 7, 1961 (age 65)
- Place of birth: Seattle, Washington, United States
- Height: 5 ft 7 in (1.70 m)
- Position: Forward

College career
Years	Team	Apps	(Gls)
1983–1984	North Carolina Tar Heels	44	(36)

International career
1986	United States	4	(1)

Managerial career
- Durham Cavaliers
- Durham Cavaliers Middle School Boys
- Chapel Hill-Durham Strikers
- Blake Bears Middle School Boys
- Blake Bears JV
- 2009–2010: Blake Bears Boys

Joan Maria Dunlap-Seivold (née Dunlap; born August 7, 1961) is an American former soccer player who played as a forward, making four appearances for the United States women's national team.

== Career ==
After hearing of Dunlap-Seivold playing for a club team in Seattle, North Carolina Tar Heels head coach Anson Dorrance flew there to scout her as a replacement for injured forward Stephanie Zeh. Shortly after, Dorrance offered her a full athletic scholarship to attend the University of North Carolina at Chapel Hill, which she accepted. She played for the Tar Heels during two seasons, where she was a letter-winner and won the NCAA championship in 1983 and 1984. In total, she scored 36 goals and recorded 22 assists in 44 appearances. In 1984 she was selected as an NSCAA Second-Team All-American. She also holds the school's record for number of consecutive matches with a point (goal or assist), with a 23-game streak during her career. In 1987, she was included in the South soccer team at the U.S. Olympic Festival.

Dunlap-Seivold made her international debut for the United States on July 7, 1986 in the 1986 North American Cup friendly tournament against Canada, scoring in the 2–0 win. In total, she made four appearances for the U.S. and scored one goal, earning her final cap on July 26, 1986 in the Mundialito against Italy.

She later served as the coach of the Durham Academy women's soccer team, where she was twice honored as North Carolina's Coach of the Year. She also coached the boys' middle school team at Durham, as well as the Chapel Hill-Durham Strikers club team. She later became the head coach of the boys' soccer team at The Blake School in Minneapolis, where she also served as the assistant athletic director. She had coached the middle school boys' team as well as the girls' junior varsity team prior. Dunlap-Seivold has led youth soccer camps in both Minnesota and North Carolina.

In a vote conducted by Washington Youth Soccer in 2016, Dunlap-Seivold was included by the soccer community in the Top 50 Women Players ranking.

== Personal life ==
Dunlap-Seivold, a native of Seattle, worked as a babysitter while raising her son Johnny prior to college. She planned on pursuing higher education once her son was older, until she was offered a full scholarship by UNC. She accepted the offer to attend Chapel Hill, where she was a full-time student, athlete, and single mother. She later gave birth to a second son.

She is married to Joey Seivold, who played for the UNC lacrosse team from 1983 to 1987.

== Career statistics ==
=== International ===
United States
Year	Apps	Goals
1986	4	1
Total	4	1

=== International goals ===
No.	Date	Location	Opponent	Result	Competition
1	July 7, 1986	Blaine, Minnesota, United States	Canada	2–0	1986 North American Cup

== Honors ==
United States

- 1986 North American Cup
