= Method Road Soccer Stadium =

Stadium in Raleigh, North Carolina

Coordinates: 35°47′18.11″N 78°41′34.69″W

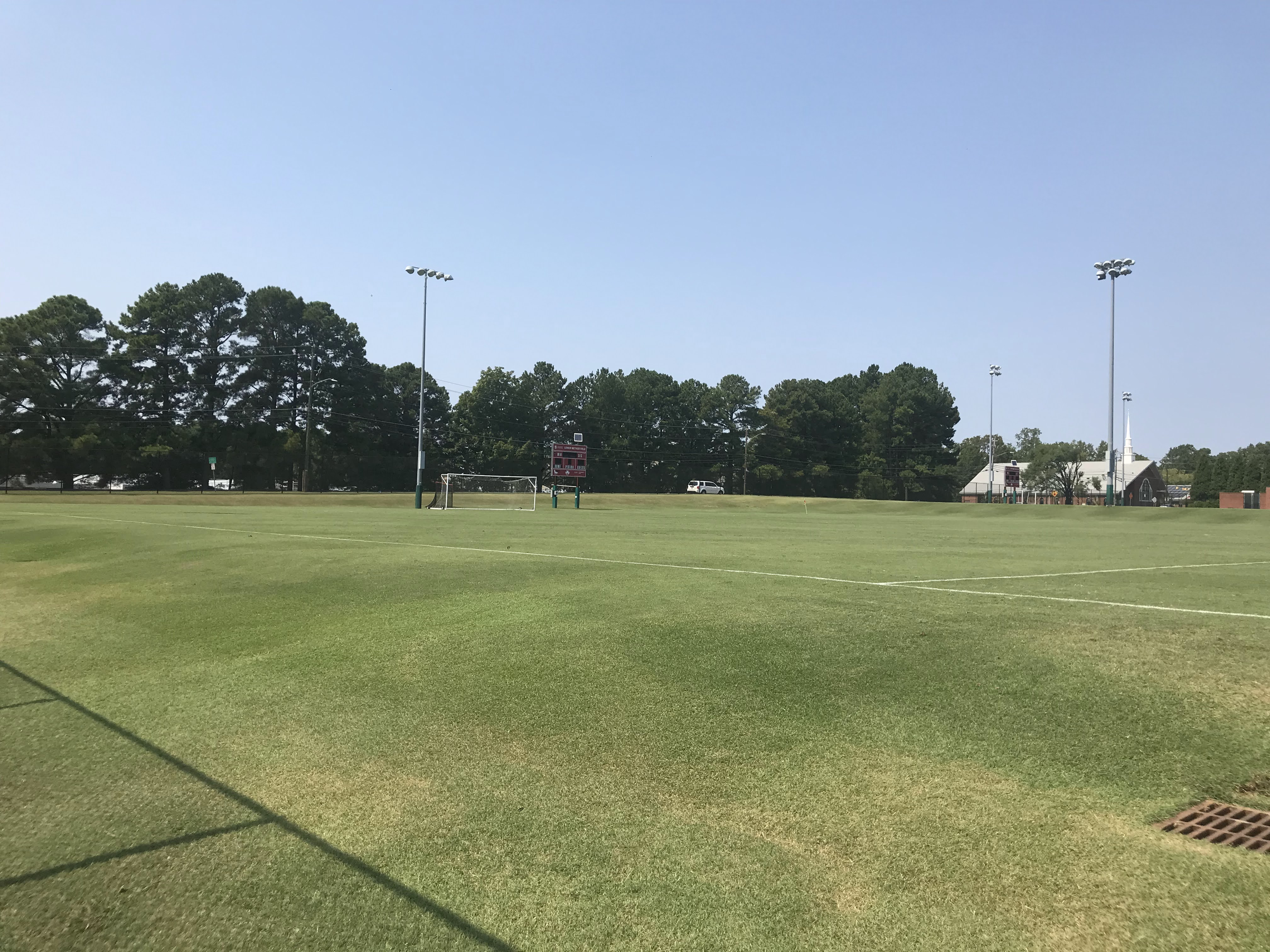
- The stadium in 2021
- Interactive map of Method Road Soccer Stadium
- Owner: North Carolina State University
- Operator: North Carolina State Athletics
- Event: Stadium
- Current use: Lacrosse

Construction
- Opened: 1984; 42 years ago

Tenants
- NC State Wolfpack teams: Men's soccer (1984–2007); Women's soccer (1984–2007); Men's acrosse (MCLA)

Website
- gopack.com/methodroadstadium

Method Road Soccer Stadium (usually called "Method Road") is a stadium in Raleigh, North Carolina. The venue, opened in the summer of 1984. was the on campus soccer stadium at North Carolina State University.

Method Road held 3,000 spectators before the bleachers were removed following the construction of Dail Soccer Field. The playing field has been retained for student use.

Method Road also hosts the NC State Club lacrosse team that competes in the Men's Collegiate Lacrosse Association.

Events and tenants
| Preceded by Fetzer Field | Host of the Women's College Cup; 1989 | Succeeded by Fetzer Field |
