= MSU Denver Roadrunners =

- University: MSU of Denver
- Conference: Rocky Mountain Athletic
- NCAA: Division II
- Athletic director: Todd Thurman
- Location: Denver, CO
- Varsity teams: 15
- Basketball arena: Auraria Event Center
- Baseball stadium: Assembly Athletic Complex
- Mascot: Rowdy the Roadrunner
- Nickname: Roadrunners
- Fight song: A Rowdy Encounter
- Colors: Navy blue and red
- Website: roadrunnersathletics.com
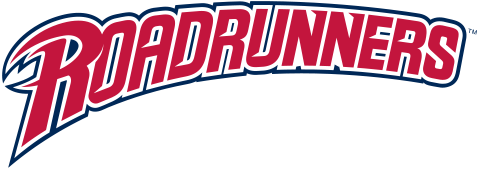

The MSU Denver Roadrunners are the athletic teams that represent Metropolitan State University of Denver. The Roadrunners participate in 15 intercollegiate sports and compete in the Division II Rocky Mountain Athletic Conference.

== History ==
MSU Denver has produced 239 All-Americans and was one of the seven charter members of the Colorado Athletic Conference in 1989 before joining the Rocky Mountain Athletic Conference in 1996. MSU Denver competed as a NAIA member until 1983, when the Roadrunners jumped to the NCAA Division II ranks.

Since 1998, MSU Denver has captured 32 regular season conference titles, 35 conference tournament championships, as well as the 2000 & 2002 NCAA Division II Men's Basketball National Championships and the 2004 and 2006 NCAA Division II Women's Soccer national crowns.

MSU Denver also boasts five individual national championships. Men's swimmer Darwin Strickland won national championships in the 50 yard freestyle and 100 yard freestyle in 1995 and also won the 100 free in 1996. Anthony Luna won men's track championships in the 800 meters during the indoor and outdoor seasons in 2009. MSU Denver's main rivals are Colorado School of Mines, Fort Lewis College, and Regis University.

Completed in 2015, the Assembly Athletic Complex is the home site for six of the Roadrunners’ 15 sports, including, baseball, softball, men's and women's soccer, and men's and women's tennis. The site is located south of the Colfax viaduct adjacent to Shoshone Street, east of I-25. In addition to hosting the athletic and academic programs, the University hosts activities for the community's youth. The baseball, softball and soccer fields will be synthetic turf surfaces.

The 2016 Division II National Championships Festival marked the ninth occurrence of the distinctive Division II event, and was hosted by MSU Denver and the Denver Sports Commission. 76 qualifying teams and 20 qualifying individuals represented their institutions by competing for national championships in men's and women's golf, women's lacrosse, softball, and men's and women's tennis.

=== NCAA ===
Results in the National Collegiate Athletic Association

| Sport | Titles | Seasons |
| Men's Basketball | 2 | 2000, 2002 |
| Women's Soccer | 2 | 2004, 2006 |
| Women's Volleyball | 1 | 2025 |
| Total | 5 | |

==== Runners Up ====
- 1999 Men's Basketball
- 2013 Men's Basketball

==== Final Four ====
- 2002 Women's Soccer
- 2004 Men's Basketball
- 2008 Women's Soccer
- 2010 Women's Softball
- 2014 Men's Basketball

==== Regional host ====
- Cross Country: 1995, 2011
- Men's Basketball: 2000, 2004, 2005, 2013, 2014
- National Championships Festival: 2016
- Women's Soccer: 2003, 2004, 2005, 2006, 2008
- Women's Volleyball: 2001, 2003

=== NCAA individual champions ===
- 1995 Darwin Strickland (Men's Swimming/50 Free)
- 1995 Darwin Strickland (Men's Swimming/100 Free)
- 1996 Darwin Strickland (Men's Swimming/100 Free)
- 2009 Anthony Luna (Men's Indoor Track/800 meters)
- 2009 Anthony Luna (Men's Outdoor Track/800 meters)

=== RMAC ===
Results in the Rocky Mountain Athletic Conference:

| Sport | Titles | Seasons |
| Men's Baseball | 2 | 1998, 2002^{1} |
| Men's Basketball | 17 | 1998, 1999^{1}, 2000^{2}, 2001^{1}, 2003^{1}, 2004^{2}, 2005^{2}, 2007^{2}, 2009^{2}, 2010^{1}, 2013^{2}, 2014^{2} |
| Men's Soccer | 3 | 2003^{1}, 2004^{1}, 2007 |
| Men's Tennis | 8 | 1998^{1}, 1999, 2000^{1}, 2001^{2}, 2002‡, 2006^{1}, 2007^{2}, 2008‡, |
| Women's Basketball | 4 | 1998^{2}, 2005^{1}, 2011, 2012 |
| Women's Golf | 1 | 2015^{1} |
| Women's Soccer | 8 | 2002^{2}, 2003, 2004^{2}, 2005^{2}, 2006, 2007, 2008^{2}, 2009 |
| Women's Softball | 3 | 2009^{2}, 2010^{2}, 2011 |
| Women's Tennis | 3 | 2001^{2}, 2002^{2}, 2003^{2} |
| Women's Volleyball | 12 | 1998, 2001^{2}, 2002^{2}, 2003^{2}, 2006^{1}, 2009^{1}, 2016^{3}, 2021^{3}, 2022^{2}, 2023^{3}, 2024^{2}, 2025^{2} |
| Total | 61 | Since 1996 |

Notes

- ^{1} Tournament champions
- ^{2} Regular season & Tournament champions
- ^{3} Regular season champions

=== RMAC All-Sports Cup ===
The RMAC All-Sports Competition Cup is awarded to the institution which accumulates the most points over the year based on its teams' outcome in the RMAC's four core sports, along with six wildcard sports. The four core sports are football or men's soccer, men's basketball, women's basketball and volleyball, while the six wild card sports consist of three men's sports and three women's sports, which are designated by that institutions' best finish in those 16 Olympic sports (21 total RMAC sports). Total RMAC All-Sports Competition Cup points are calculated based on how the teams finish in the RMAC regular season standings. In the scenario where teams do not have regular season standings, conference championship results are used.

| Champions | Year |
|---|---|
| 2 | 2006–2007, 2008–2009 |

== Sports ==
MSU Denver has produced 239 All-Americans and was one of the seven charter members of the Colorado Athletic Conference in 1989 before joining the Rocky Mountain Athletic Conference in 1996. MSU Denver competed as a NAIA member until 1983, when the Roadrunners jumped to the NCAA Division II ranks. Since 1998, MSU Denver has captured 32 regular season conference titles, 35 conference tournament championships, as well as the 2000 & 2002 NCAA Division II Men's Basketball National Championships and the 2004 and 2006 NCAA Division II Women's Soccer national crowns. MSU Denver also boasts five individual national championships. Men's swimmer Darwin Strickland won national championships in the 50 yard freestyle and 100 yard freestyle in 1995 and also won the 100 free in 1996. Anthony Luna won men's track championships in the 800 meters during the indoor and outdoor seasons in 2009. Pep Band

| Men's sports | Women's sports |
|---|---|
| Baseball | Basketball |
| Basketball | Cross country |
| Cross country | Golf |
| Soccer | Soccer |
| Tennis | Softball |
| Track and field | Tennis |
| | Track and field |
| | Volleyball |

== Facilities ==
- Auraria Events Center - Basketball/Volleyball
- Auraria Field - Baseball/Soccer/Softball
- CommonGround Golf Course, Green Valley Ranch Golf Club - Women's Golf
- Roadrunners Athletic Complex (construction phase)
- World Indoor Airport

== Club sports ==
- Baseball
- Capoeira
- Cheer and dance
- Cycling
- Fencing
- Fishing
- Football
- Men's ice hockey
- Inline hockey
- Lacrosse
- Martial arts and self defense
- Rock climbing
- Men's soccer
- Squash
- Swimming and diving
- Taekwando
- Ultimate Frisbee
- Men's volleyball

== Rivals ==
- Colorado School of Mines
- Fort Lewis College
- Regis University
- United States Air Force Academy
- Colorado Mesa University

== Camps and clinics ==
- MSU Denver Soccer Camps

== Roadrunners in the Pros ==
=== Active ===
| Name | Nat. |
| Paul Brotherson | (Australia) |
| John Bynum | (United States) |
| Steven Emory | (United States) |
| Brandon Jefferson | (United States) |
| Shakir Johnson | (Jamaica) |
| Luke Kendall | (Australia) |
| CJ Massingale | (United States) |
| Ben Ortner | (Austria) |
| Hayden Smith | (Australia) |
| Lester Strong | (United States) |
| Jesse Wagstaff | (Australia) |
| Mark Worthington | (Australia) |

=== Retired ===
| Name | Nat. |
| Patrick Mutombo | (Democratic Republic of the Congo) (Belgium) |
| Benas Veikalas | (Lithuania) |
| David Barlow | (Australia) |

== Roadrunner Olympians ==
| Name | Nat. | Team |
| David Barlow | (Australia) | Men's Basketball: 2008 Summer Olympics, 2012 Summer Olympics |
| Todd Schmitz | (United States) | Swimming Coach: 2012 Summer Olympics |
| Mark Worthington | (Australia) | Men's Basketball:2008 Summer Olympics, 2012 Summer Olympics |
