= MSU Denver Roadrunners women's soccer =

American college soccer team

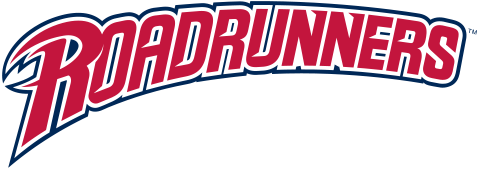
- University: Metropolitan State University of Denver
- Conference: RMAC
- Location: Denver, Colorado
- Nickname: Roadrunners
- Colors: Navy blue and red
Home	Away

NCAA Tournament championships
- 2004, 2006

NCAA Tournament Semifinals
- 2002, 2004, 2006, 2008

NCAA Tournament Quarterfinals
- 2002, 2004, 2006, 2008

NCAA Tournament Round of 16
- 2002, 2004, 2006, 2008

NCAA Tournament appearances
- 1998, 2002, 2003, 2004, 2005, 2006, 2007, 2008, 2009, 2010, 2011, 2012, 2013, 2014

Conference Tournament championships
- Colorado Athletic Conference; 1990; Rocky Mountain Athletic Conference; 2002, 2004, 2005, 2008

Conference Regular Season championships
- Colorado Athletic Conference; 1990; Rocky Mountain Athletic Conference; 2002, 2003, 2004, 2005, 2006, 2007, 2008, 2009

The MSU Denver women's soccer team, nicknamed Roadrunners, represents Metropolitan State University of Denver in Denver, Colorado, United States.

== Postseason results ==
=== National Championships ===
Year	Coach	Rival	Score	Record
2004	Danny Sanchez	Adelphi	3–2	25–1–0
2006	Danny Sanchez	Grand Valley State	1–0 (a.e.t.)	24–2–0
National Championships			2	

=== 2004 NCAA Tournament Results ===
Round	Rival	Score
Round #1	West Texas A&M	2–0
Sweet 16	#10 Regis	1–0
Elite 8	#15 Seattle	1–0
Final 4	#11 Nebraska-Omaha	2–0
Championship	#8 Adelphi	3–2

=== 2006 NCAA Tournament Results ===
Round	Rival	Score
Round #1	#24 West Texas A&M	3–2 (a.e.t.)
Sweet 16	#7 St. Edwards	2–0
Elite 8	#3 UC San Diego	2–0
Final 4	#2 West Chester	2–1 (a.e.t.)
Championship	#8 Grand Valley State	1–0 (a.e.t.)

=== Final Four history ===
Year	Position
2002	Semifinalist
2004	Champion
2006	Champion
2008	Semifinalist
