= Lee Flames =

Intercollegiate sports teams of Lee University

- University: Lee University
- Conference: Gulf South
- NCAA: Division II
- Athletic director: John Maupin
- Location: Cleveland, Tennessee
- Varsity teams: 20 (9 men's, 11 women's)
- Basketball arena: Paul Dana Walker Arena
- Baseball stadium: Larry Carpenter Stadium at Olympic Field
- Softball stadium: Butler Field
- Soccer stadium: Lee University Soccer Field
- Tennis venue: DeVos Tennis Center
- Mascot: Valor the Viking
- Nickname: Flames
- Colors: Maroon and white
- Website: leeuflames.com
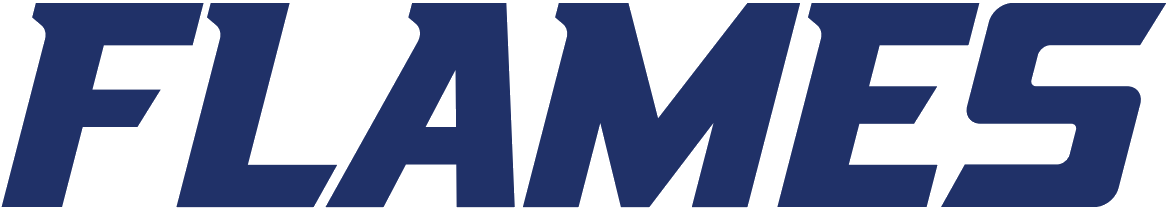

The Lee Flames are the athletic teams that represent Lee University, located in Cleveland, Tennessee, in intercollegiate sports at the Division II level of the National Collegiate Athletic Association (NCAA). The Flames have primarily competed in the Gulf South Conference since the 2013–14 academic year.

Lee competes in twenty intercollegiate varsity sports. Men's sports include baseball, basketball, cheerleading, cross country, golf, soccer, tennis, and track and field (indoor and outdoor); while women's sports include basketball, cheerleading, cross country, golf, lacrosse, soccer, softball, tennis, track and field (indoor and outdoor), and volleyball.

== Conference affiliations ==
NAIA

- Southern States Athletic Conference (2004–2013)

NCAA

- Gulf South Conference (2013–present)

The Flames were also members of the National Christian College Athletic Association (NCCAA), primarily competing as an independent in the Mid-East Region of the Division I level.

== Varsity teams ==
Men's sports	Women's sports
Baseball	Basketball
Basketball	Cheerleading
Cheerleading	Cross country
Cross country	Golf
Golf	Lacrosse
Soccer	Soccer
Tennis	Softball
Track and field^{†}	Tennis
	Track and field^{†}
	Volleyball
† – Track and field includes both indoor and outdoor

Club sports are offered such as boxing, men's and women's rugby, spikeball and ultimate frisbee.

=== Men's cross country ===
Lee's men's cross country team won at an NCCAA national title in 2014. The program won four GSC titles in a row (2015, 2016, 2017, and 2018), as well as back to back South Region titles in 2016 and 2017. The Men's XC team has finished as high as 18th in a national championship in 2016.

=== Women's cross country ===
Lee's women's cross country team won three GSC Championships in a row (2017, 2018, and 2019), as well as a South Region title in 2019. The Lady Flames have finished as high as 14th in a national championship in 2019.

=== Soccer ===
Lee's Lady Flames soccer team won the NAIA National Championship in 2008 2009, 2010, and 2011. Lee's Lady Flames and men's soccer team both won the NCCAA National Championship in 2014.

== Facilities ==
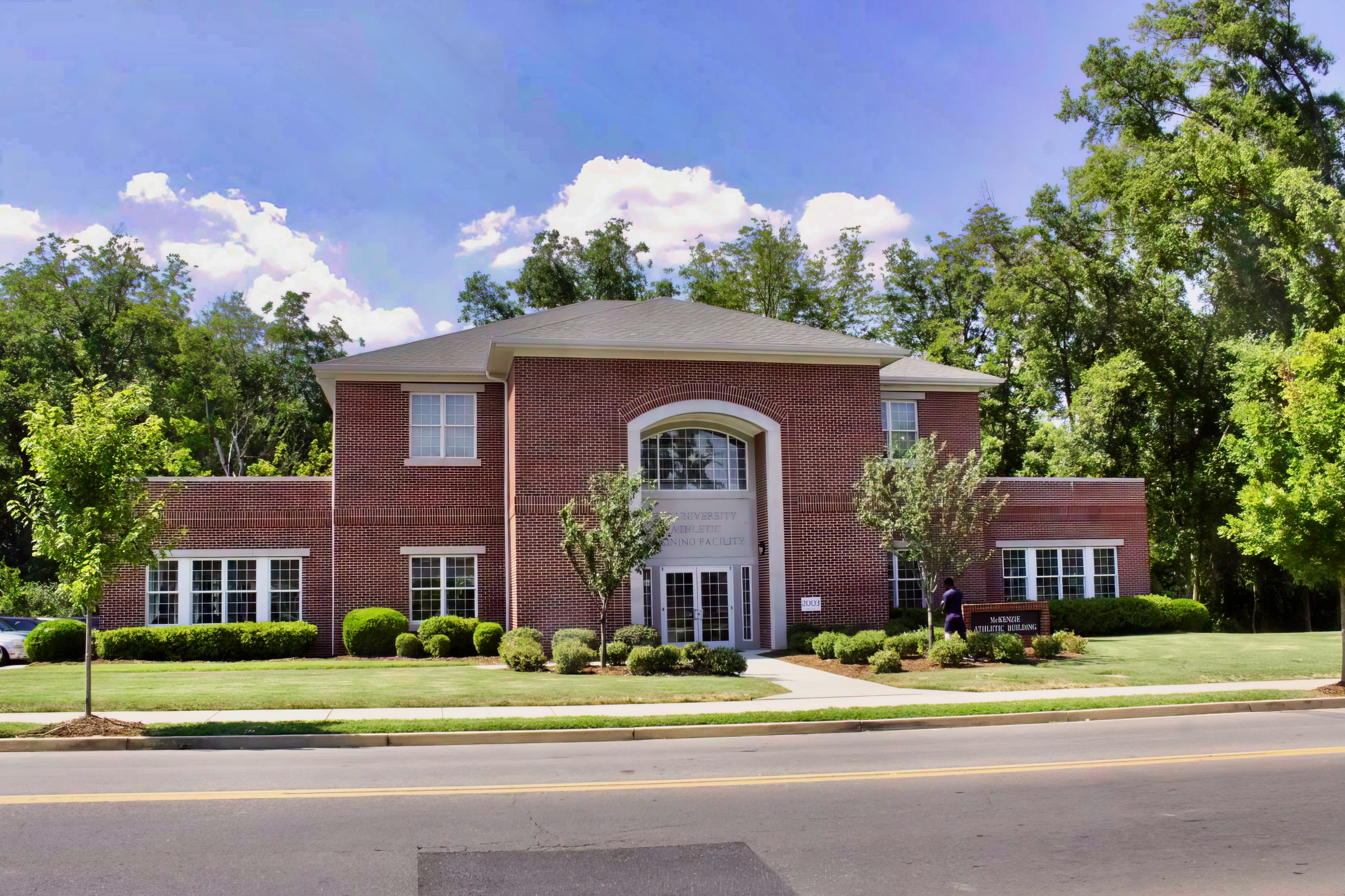
Training facility

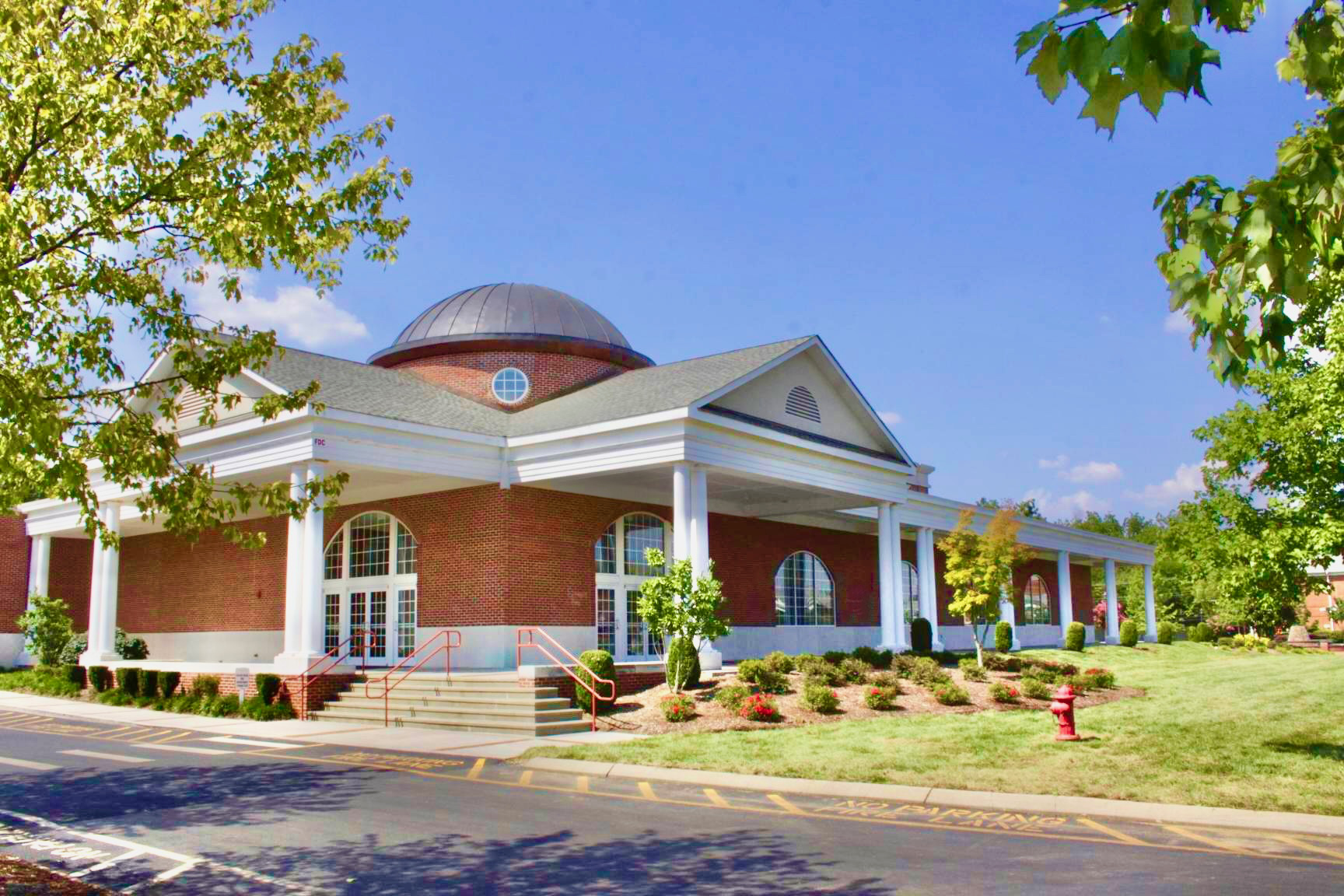
Walker Arena

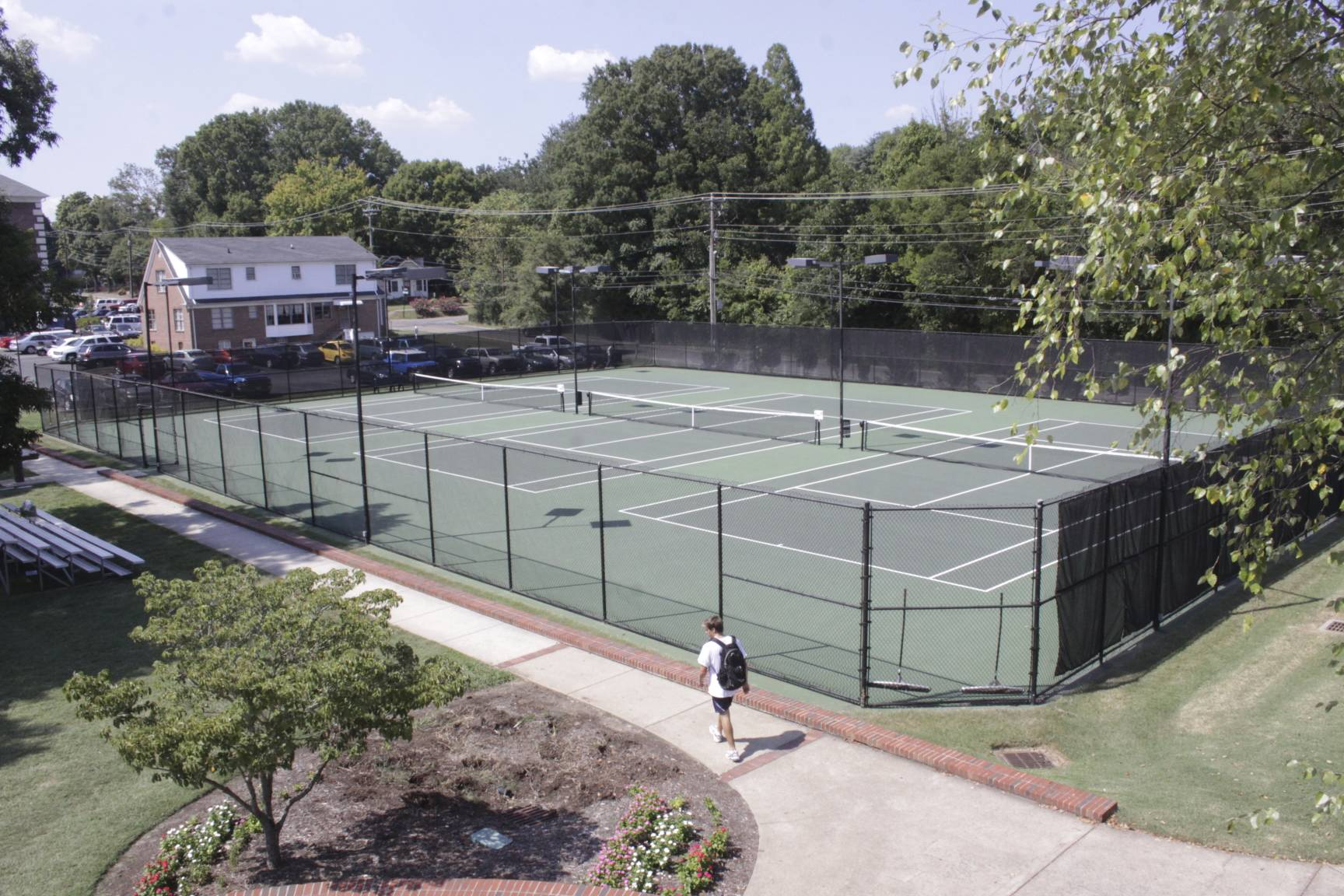
DeVos Tennis Center

== National championships ==
=== Team ===
Sport	Association	Division	Year	Opponent/Runner-up	Score
Women's soccer (4)	NAIA	Single	2008	Concordia Oregon	3–0
Women's soccer (4)	NAIA	Single	2009	Point Loma	2–0
Women's soccer (4)	NAIA	Single	2010	Hastings	3–0
Women's soccer (4)	NAIA	Single	2011	Concordia Oregon	3–0

== Notable alumni ==
=== Women's soccer ===
- Ode Fulutudilu
