= 1989 NCAA Division I women's soccer tournament =

1989 NCAA women's soccer tournament
Women's College Cup (semifinals & final)

Tournament details
- Country: United States
- Dates: November–December 1989
- Teams: 12

Final positions
- Champions: North Carolina Tar Heels (7th title, 8th College Cup)
- Runners-up: Colorado College Tigers (2nd title match, 3rd College Cup)
- Semifinalists: NC State Wolfpack (2nd College Cup); Santa Clara Broncos (1st College Cup)

Tournament statistics
- Matches played: 11
- Goals scored: 40 (3.64 per match)
- Attendance: 8,112 (737 per match)
- Top goal scorer(s): Shannon Higgins, UNC (3)

Awards
- Best player: Kristine Lilly, UNC (Offensive); Tracey Bates, UNC (Defensive)
- All statistics correct as of 5/1/2015.

The 1989 NCAA Division I women's soccer tournament was the eighth annual single-elimination tournament to determine the national champion of NCAA Division I women's collegiate soccer. The championship game was played again at Method Road Soccer Stadium in Raleigh, North Carolina during December 1989.

North Carolina defeated Colorado College in the final, 2–0, to win their seventh national title. Coached by Anson Dorrance, the Tar Heels finished the season 24–0–1. This was the fourth of North Carolina's record nine consecutive national titles (1986–1994). It was also part of the Tar Heels' ten-year unbeaten streak that ran from the 1984 championship game all the way until the 1994 season.

The most outstanding offensive player was Kristine Lilly from North Carolina, and the most outstanding defensive player was Tracey Bates, also from North Carolina. Shannon Higgins, also from North Carolina, was the tournament's leading scorer (3 goals, 4 assists).

== Qualification ==
After the establishment of the NCAA Division II Women's Soccer Championship in 1988, only Division I women's soccer programs were eligible to qualify for the tournament. Nonetheless, the tournament field remained fixed at 12 teams.

Team	Appearance	Previous	Record
UC Santa Barbara	6th	1988	15-2-1
Colorado College	6th	1988	14-3
Connecticut	8th	1988	14-2-2
George Mason	7th	1988	11-6-1
Hartford	1st	None	16-3
Massachusetts	8th	1988	11-3-4
North Carolina	8th	1988	21-0-1
NC State	5th	1988	13-7-2
Santa Clara	1st	None	13-4
Virginia	3rd	1988	16-4
William & Mary	6th	1988	14-3-2
Wisconsin	3rd	1988	14-4

== Bracket ==
First round
Hartford (2OT, PK)	3
Connecticut	2
NC State	3
George Mason	0
UC Santa Barbara	1
Wisconsin	0
Massachusetts	2
Virginia	1

Second round
North Carolina	9
Hartford	0
William & Mary	1
NC State	2
Santa Clara	2
UC Santa Barbara	1
Colorado College	5
Massachusetts	2

Semifinals (Women's College Cup); Method Road Soccer Stadium; Raleigh, North Carolina
North Carolina	2
NC State	0
Santa Clara	0
Colorado College	2

Championship (Women's College Cup); Method Road Soccer Stadium; Raleigh, North Carolina
North Carolina	2
Colorado College	0

=== Final ===
19 Nov 1989	North Carolina	2–0	Colorado College	Raleigh, NC
	Higgins ?	Report		Stadium: Method Road Soccer Stadium

Rankings from United Soccer Coaches Final Regular Season Rankings

== See also ==
- 1989 NCAA Division I men's soccer tournament
- 1989 NCAA Division II women's soccer tournament
- 1989 NCAA Division III women's soccer tournament
- 1989 NAIA women's soccer championship
