= 1990 NCAA Division I women's soccer tournament =

1990 NCAA women's soccer tournament
Women's College Cup (semifinals & final)

Tournament details
- Country: United States
- Dates: November–December 1990
- Teams: 12

Final positions
- Champions: North Carolina Tar Heels (8th title, 9th College Cup)
- Runners-up: Connecticut Huskies (2nd title match, 4th College Cup)
- Semifinalists: Colorado College Tigers (4th College Cup); Santa Clara Broncos (2nd College Cup)

Tournament statistics
- Matches played: 11
- Goals scored: 37 (3.36 per match)
- Attendance: 13,131 (1,194 per match)
- Top goal scorer(s): Kristine Lilly, UNC (4)

Awards
- Best player: Kristine Lilly, UNC (Offensive); Stacey Blazo, UNC (Defensive)
- All statistics correct as of 5/2/2015.

The 1990 NCAA Division I women's soccer tournament was the ninth annual single-elimination tournament to determine the national champion of NCAA Division I women's collegiate soccer. The championship game was played at Fetzer Field in Chapel Hill, North Carolina during December 1990.

North Carolina defeated Connecticut Huskies in the final, 6–0, to win their eighth national title. Coached by Anson Dorrance, the Tar Heels finished the season undefeated, 24–0. This would go on to become the fifth of North Carolina's record nine consecutive national titles (1986–1994). It was also part of the Tar Heels' ten-year unbeaten streak that ran from the 1984 championship game all the way until the 1994 season.

The most outstanding offensive player was again Kristine Lilly from North Carolina, and the most outstanding defensive player was Stacey Blazo, also from North Carolina. Lilly was also the tournament's leading scorer (4 goals, 2 assists).

== Qualification ==
All Division I women's soccer programs were eligible to qualify for the tournament. The tournament field remained fixed at 12 teams.

Team	Appearance	Previous	Record
UC Santa Barbara	7th	1989	15-1-1
Colorado College	7th	1989	14-2-2
Connecticut	9th	1989	12-7-1
Hartford	2nd	1989	11-6-2
North Carolina	9th	1989	17-1-1
NC State	6th	1989	13-6-1
Santa Clara	2nd	1989	17-0-1
SMU	1st	Never	14-5-1
Stanford	1st	Never	15-2-1
Virginia	4th	1989	18-2
William & Mary	7th	1989	12-7-1
Wisconsin	4th	1989	16-1-1

== Bracket ==
First round Campus sites
NC State	2
William & Mary	0
Colorado College	3
SMU	1
UC Santa Barbara	1
Stanford	0
Connecticut	2
Hartford	1

Second round Campus sites
North Carolina (2OT)	4
NC State	3
Wisconsin	1
Colorado College	2
Santa Clara	2
UC Santa Barbara	0
Virginia	1
Connecticut	2

Semifinals (Women's College Cup); Chapel Hill, North Carolina
North Carolina	2
Colorado College	1
Santa Clara	1
Connecticut (2OT, PK)	2

Championship (Women's College Cup); Chapel Hill, North Carolina
North Carolina	6
Connecticut	0

== See also ==
- 1990 NCAA Division I men's soccer tournament
- 1990 NCAA Division II women's soccer tournament
- 1990 NCAA Division III women's soccer tournament
- 1990 NAIA women's soccer championship
