= NCAA Division II women's soccer tournament =

American intercollegiate college soccer tournament

- Association: NCAA
- Sport: Women's college soccer
- Founded: 1986; 40 years ago
- Division: Division II
- No. of teams: 48
- Country: United States; Canada
- Most recent champion: Florida Tech (1st)
- Most titles: Grand Valley State (7)
- Broadcaster: NCAA.com
- Website: ncaa.com/soccer
- 2025

The NCAA Division II women's soccer tournament is an annual event organized by the National Collegiate Athletic Association to determine the national champions of women's collegiate soccer among its Division II members in the United States and Canada. It has been held every year since 1988, except for 2020 during the COVID-19 pandemic.

This was the third of the NCAA-sponsored women's soccer tournaments to be established; the NCAA Division I Women's Soccer Championship began in 1981 and the NCAA Division III Women's Soccer Championship in 1986.

Florida Tech is the current champion, winning their first national title in 2025.

Grand Valley State is the most successful program, with seven national titles.

== Results ==
Keys

- (a.e.t.) – match went to extra time
- (p) – match result defined on penalties

| Ed. | Year | Host city | Championship | | | Semifinalists |
| Ed. | Year | Host city | Champion | Score | Runner-Up | Semifinalists |
|---|---|---|---|---|---|---|
| 1 | 1988 | Miami Shores, FL | Cal State (H) (1) | 1–0 | Barry | Keene State and Mercyhurst |
| 2 | 1989 | Miami Shores, FL | Barry (1) | 4–0 | Keene State | Adelphi and Cal State (DH) |
| 3 | 1990 | Miami Shores, FL | Sonoma State (1) | 2–0 | Keene State | Adelphi and Barry |
| 4 | 1991 | Carson, CA | Cal State (DH) (1) | 2–1 | Sonoma State | Adelphi and Barry |
| 5 | 1992 | Garden City, NY | Barry (2) | 3–2 | Adelphi | Franklin Pierce and Sonoma State |
| 6 | 1993 | Miami Shores, FL | Barry (3) | 2–1 | Cal Poly (SL) | Franklin Pierce & Mercyhurst |
| 7 | 1994 | Rindge, NH | Franklin Pierce (1) | 2–0 | Regis | Mercyhurst & Quincy |
| 8 | 1995 | Rindge, NH | Franklin Pierce (2) | 5–0 | Barry | Quincy & Sonoma State |
| 9 | 1996 | Boca Raton, FL | Franklin Pierce (3) | 1–0 | Lynn | Regis & St. Joseph's (IN) |
| 10 | 1997 | Carson, CA | Franklin Pierce (4) | 3–0 | West Virginia (W) | Cal State DH and Lynn |
| 11 | 1998 | Boca Raton, FL | Lynn | 3–1 | Sonoma State | Ashland & Franklin Pierce |
| 12 | 1999 | Miami Shores, FL | Franklin Pierce (5) | 3–1 | Cal Poly (PO) | Barry & Northern Kentucky |
| 13 | 2000 | Miami Shores, FL | UC San Diego (1) | 3–1 | Northern Kentucky | Barry & Franklin Pierce |
| 14 | 2001 | La Jolla, CA | UC San Diego (2) | 2–0 | Christian Brothers | Franklin Pierce & Northern Kentucky |
| 15 | 2002 | Virginia Beach, VA | Christian Brothers (1) | 2–1 | Nebraska–Omaha | Franklin Pierce & Metro State |
| 16 | 2003 | Virginia Beach, VA | Kennesaw State | 2–0 | Franklin Pierce | UC San Diego & Nebraska–Omaha |
| 17 | 2004 | Wichita Falls, TX | MSU (1) | 3–2 | Adelphi | Carson–Newman & Nebraska–Omaha |
| 18 | 2005 | Wichita Falls, TX | Nebraska–Omaha (1) | 2–1 (a.e.t.) | Seattle Pacific | Carson–Newman & Franklin Pierce |
| 19 | 2006 | Pensacola, FL | MSU (2) | 1–0 (a.e.t.) | Grand Valley State | Tampa & West Chester |
| 20 | 2007 | Orange Beach, AL | Tampa | 3–1 | Franklin Pierce | Grand Valley State & Seattle Pacific |
| 21 | 2008 | Tampa, FL | Seattle Pacific (1) | 1–0 (a.e.t.) | West Florida | Metro State & Saint Rose |
| 22 | 2009 | Tampa, FL | Grand Valley State (1) | 1–0 | Cal State (DH) | Saint Rose and West Florida |
| 23 | 2010 | Louisville, KY | Grand Valley State (2) | 4–0 | UC San Diego | Florida Tech & Saint Rose |
| 24 | 2011 | Pensacola, FL | Saint Rose (1) | 2–1 | Grand Valley State | Armstrong Atlantic & Chico State |
| 25 | 2012 | Evans, GA | West Florida (1) | 1–0 | UC San Diego | Grand Valley State & Saint Rose |
| 26 | 2013 | Evans, GA | Grand Valley State (3) | 2–0 | West Florida | American International & Western Washington |
| 27 | 2014 | Louisville, KY | Grand Valley State (4) | 3–0 | Rollins | Colorado Mines & Saint Rose |
| 28 | 2015 | Pensacola, FL | Grand Valley State (5) | 2–0 | Columbus State | Bridgeport & Western Washington |
| 29 | 2016 | Kansas, MO | Western Washington (1) | 3–2 | Grand Valley State | Columbus State & Kutztown |
| 30 | 2017 | Kansas, MO | Central Missouri (1) | 1–1 (5–3 p) | Carson–Newman | Colorado–Colorado Springs & Mercy |
| 31 | 2018 | Pittsburgh, PA | Bridgeport (1) | 1–0 | Grand Valley State | UC San Diego & Lee (TN) |
| 32 | 2019 | Pittsburgh, PA | Grand Valley State (6) | 1–0 (a.e.t.) | Western Washington | Flagler & Saint Rose |
| – | 2020 | – | (Canceled due to the COVID-19 pandemic) | | | – |
| 33 | 2021 | Colorado Springs, CO | Grand Valley State (7) | 3–2 | Saint Rose | Dallas Baptist & Lenoir-Rhyne |
| 34 | 2022 | Seattle, WA | Western Washington (2) | 2–1 | West Chester | Columbus State & Ferris State |
| 35 | 2023 | East Ridge, TN | Point Loma (1) | 1–0 | Washburn | Adelphi & Florida Tech |
| 36 | 2024 | Matthews, NC | Cal Poly Pomona (1) | 2–1 | Minnesota State | Columbus State & Franklin Pierce |
| 37 | 2025 | Colorado Springs, CO | Florida Tech (1) | 3–0 | Franklin Pierce | Washburn & Cal Poly Pomona |
| 38 | 2026 | Kansas City, MO | | | | |
| 39 | 2027 | Huntsville, AL | | | | |

== Champions ==
National Championships by school: 7, 5, 3, 2, 1

=== Active programs ===
| Team | Titles | Years |
|---|---|---|
| Grand Valley State | 7 | 2009, 2010, 2013, 2014, 2015, 2019, 2021 |
| Franklin Pierce | 5 | 1994, 1995, 1996, 1997, 1999 |
| Barry | 3 | 1989, 1992, 1993 |
| MSU Denver | 2 | 2004, 2006 |
| Western Washington | 2 | 2016, 2022 |
| Florida Tech | 1 | 2025 |
| Cal Poly Pomona | 1 | 2024 |
| Point Loma | 1 | 2023 |
| Bridgeport | 1 | 2018 |
| Central Missouri | 1 | 2017 |
| Seattle Pacific | 1 | 2008 |
| Tampa | 1 | 2007 |
| Christian Brothers | 1 | 2002 |
| Lynn | 1 | 1998 |
| Cal State Dominiguez Hills | 1 | 1991 |
| Cal State East Bay | 1 | 1988 |

=== Former programs ===
| Team | Titles | Years |
|---|---|---|
| UC San Diego | 2 | 2000, 2001 |
| West Florida | 1 | 2012 |
| Saint Rose | 1 | 2011 |
| Omaha | 1 | 2005 |
| Kennesaw State | 1 | 2003 |
| Sonoma State | 1 | 1990 |

== See also ==
- AIAW Intercollegiate Women's Soccer Champions
- NCAA Women's Soccer Championships (Division I, Division III)
- NCAA Men's Soccer Championships (Division I, Division II, Division III)
- NAIA Women's Soccer Championship
- Intercollegiate Soccer Football Association
