= Fetzer Field =

Former athletic field for UNC Chapel Hill

Robert Fetzer Field

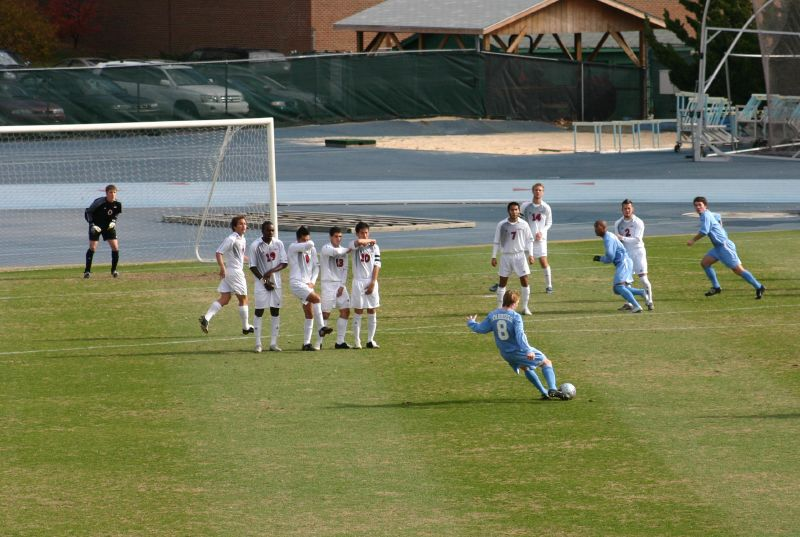
- North Carolina v SMU men's soccer at Fetzer Field, 2005
- Interactive map of Robert Fetzer Field
- Full name: Irwin Belk Track at Robert Fetzer Field
- Location: South Rd, Chapel Hill, NC 27599, USA
- Coordinates: 35°54′31″N 79°02′40″W
- Owner: University of North Carolina
- Capacity: 5,025
- Surface: Field: Grass; Track: Full-depth Polyurethene ISS 2000 encapsulated

Construction
- Opened: 1935
- Renovated: 1988–1990
- Closed: 2017; 9 years ago
- Demolished: 2017

Tenants
- North Carolina Tar Heels (NCAA) (1935–2017); Carolina Courage (WUSA) (2001)

Website
- goheels.com/fetzerfield

Robert Fetzer Field was a stadium located in Chapel Hill, North Carolina, and was the home of the lacrosse and soccer teams of the University of North Carolina at Chapel Hill, the North Carolina Tar Heels. The four teams that called Fetzer field their home (men's and women's lacrosse and men's and women's soccer) have a combined total of 26 national championships.

The Carolina Courage of the Women's United Soccer Association played their first season in 2001 at the stadium.

The stadium was demolished in 2017 to make way for the new Dorrance Field soccer and lacrosse stadium that was built on the same site.

== Construction ==
Fetzer Field was built in 1935 and named for Bob Fetzer, the school's first full-time athletic director. The original part of the complex, including the track, grandstand and field, was built in 1935 as a part of the government's Works Projects Administration (WPA). The construction provided jobs to the people living in Chapel Hill, North Carolina. Renovations began in 1988 when the playing field was redone and several additions were made, which included two new ticket booths, new bleachers and a concession stand.

== History of the teams ==
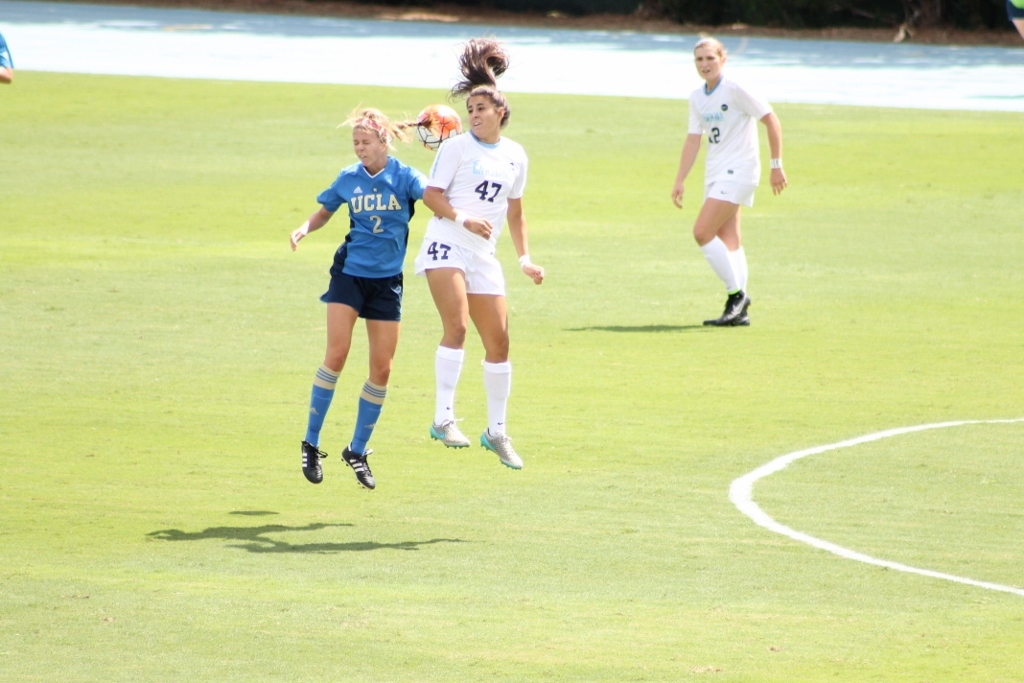
UNC women's vs UCLA, women's soccer at Fetzer Field, 2015

The first team to play on the field was the men's soccer team after its inception in 1947. They played alone for two years until the inception of the men's lacrosse team in 1949. These teams would call Fetzer home for three decades before the women's soccer team was created in 1979. At the time 24-year-old Anson Dorrance was named head coach of both the men's and women's soccer teams. He continued to coach both teams until 1989 when he started solely coaching the women's soccer team. Dorrance retired prior to the 2024 season.

Men's and women's lacrosse, both national champions in the past, also play on Fetzer Field on spring days. The men's program has won multiple NCAA Championships: 1981, 1982, 1986, 1991, and 2016. The Tar Heels women's team won the NCAA Championship both in 2013, in a triple-overtime win over the multiple-championship program from the University of Maryland, and in 2016. Both are perennially very competitive programs.

== Notable players ==
Fetzer Field has been the home field to multiple players that would eventually play soccer professionally or for the national team. Fetzer has been the home of many nationally recognized women’s soccer players. The following players have been named national player of the year for women's soccer:

- April Heinrichs – 1984 1986
- Shannon Higgins – 1988 1989
- Kristine Lilly – 1990 1991
- Mia Hamm – 1992 1993
- Tisha Venturini – 1994,
- Debbie Keller – 1995 1996,
- Staci Wilson – 1995,
- Cindy Parlow – 1996 1997 1998,
- Robin Confer – 1997,
- Lorrie Fair – 1999,
- Meredith Florance – 2000,
- Lindsay Tarpley – 2003,
- Catherine Reddick – 2003,
- Heather O'Reilly – 2006,
- Yael Averbuch – 2006,
- Casey Nogueira – 2008,
- Whitney Engen – 2009

In the 2011 Women's World Cup two UNC women's soccer players, Tobin Heath and Heather O'Reilly, saw the playing field. In December 2011 six former Tar Heels – Tobin Heath, Heather O'Reilly, Yael Averbuch, Ashlyn Harris, Megan Klingenberg – were called up to play at the National Team camp. All these players spent their collegiate careers at Fetzer Field.

== Legacy ==
Fetzer Field does not see many losses overall. It is most famous for being the home of the UNC women's soccer team, which rarely loses more than two home games in a season. Four teams (both men's and women's soccer, as well as both men's and women's lacrosse) that play on Fetzer have earned at least one national championship. In its 32 years of existence the women's soccer team has won 21 of the national championships in the sport; the most recent was in 2012. The men's soccer team has won two national championships; the men's lacrosse team has won four national championship since its inception. Woman's lacrosse won the NCAA Championship in 2013.

Many of the most famous women's soccer players have attended the University of North Carolina. Mia Hamm, who Bleacher Report says is the greatest women’s soccer player of all time, played on Fetzer field for four years. Also, since 1957 the men's soccer team has not had a losing season. In 2008, 2009, 2010 and 2011 the men's soccer team made it to the NCAA final four, and in 2011 advanced to the National Championship. The men's lacrosse team made it to the NCAA quarterfinals in 2009 and 2010. The women's lacrosse team advanced to the NCAA final four in 2009 and 2010.

== Attendance ==
The Tar Heels have long been among the nation's attendance leaders in men's and women's soccer. The record crowd for Fetzer Field was 7,212 people in 1995, who watched the women's soccer team lose to Notre Dame in the semifinals. The highest attended regular season game occurred in 1998 when the Tar Heels defeated Notre Dame, 5-1, with 6,024 people in attendance. In the 2011 NCAA elite eight men's soccer game against St. Mary's College Fetzer Field officially sold out.

== McCaskill Soccer Center and Belk Track ==
In 1997 the 'soccer hut' which had been used for both soccer teams at UNC since the 1970s was leveled, making way for a new soccer building. Athletic director Dick Baddour agreed that the soccer hut was out of date and needed to be updated. The new building was named McCaskill after Bud and Mildred McCaskill, dedicated donors to UNC. McCaskill was dedicated in 1999. The building has locker rooms for both men and women's teams and offices for both coaches. It was estimated the project cost the school roughly $1.7 million. The building is located at the North corner of Fetzer Field and Belk track. Belk track was installed in 1988 during the reconstruction of Fetzer Field. It is Carolina blue in color and is an international style track.

== Other uses ==
Fetzer Field was home to the North Carolina High School Athletic Association track and field state championships. It has also hosted the Junior Olympics. Several foundations host fundraisers on Fetzer. Mia Hamm, former UNC women's soccer player and founder of the Mia Hamm foundation, gave a speech during the halftime of games in 2010 and 2011 to raise awareness for bone marrow donations. Also Relay for Life is annually hosted on Fetzer Field.

| Preceded by UCF Soccer Field; Warren McGuirk Alumni Stadium; Method Road Soccer Stadium; Merlo Field | Host of the Women's College Cup; 1984; 1988; 1990–1993; 1995 | Succeeded by George Mason Stadium; Method Road Soccer Stadium; Merlo Field; Buck Shaw Stadium |
