= NAIA women's soccer championship =

Annual tournament

NAIA Women's Soccer Championship
- Organizer(s): NAIA
- Founded: 1984; 42 years ago
- Region: United States; Canada
- Teams: 32
- Current champion(s): Keiser (3rd title)
- Most championships: Westmont Warriors (5 titles)
- Website: naia.org/sports/wsoc

The NAIA women's soccer championship is the annual tournament to determine the national champions of NAIA women's collegiate soccer in the United States and Canada. It has been held annually since 1984.

The most successful program is Westmont (CA), with 5 NAIA national titles.

Keiser are the current champions, winning their third NAIA national title in 2025.

== Results ==
Year	Site	Championship match		
Year	Site	Champion	Score	Runner-up
1984; Details	St. Louis, MO	St. Mary's (CA)	4–0	Cardinal Newman (MO)
1985; Details	Tacoma, WA	Westmont	4–2	Puget Sound
1986; Details	Wilmington, OH	St. Mary's (CA) (2)	3–0	Berry
1987; Details	Due West, SC	Berry	1–0	Erskine
1988; Details	Abilene, Texas	Pacific Lutheran	2–0	Hardin–Simmons
1989; Details	Due West, SC	Pacific Lutheran (2)	2–0	Berry
1990; Details	Due West, SC	Berry (2)	3–1 (2OT)	Pacific Lutheran (WA)
1991; Details	Boca Raton, Florida	Pacific Lutheran (3)	4–0	Missouri Valley
1992; Details	Tacoma, Washington	Lynn	1–0	Pacific Lutheran
1993; Details	St. Charles, Missouri	Berry (4)	1-0 (OT)	Lynn
1994; Details	Mount Berry, Georgia	Lynn (2)	3–1	Park (MO)
1995; Details	Mount Berry, Georgia	Lynn (3)	4–1	Lindenwood
1996; Details	San Antonio, Texas	Simon Fraser	3–2 (5OT)	Mobile
1997; Details	San Antonio, Texas	Mobile	2–1 (OT)	Simon Fraser
1998; Details	Mobile, Alabama	Azusa Pacific	2–1	Simon Fraser
1999; Details	Miami, Florida	Westmont (2)	3–0	Transylvania
2000; Details	Miami, Florida	Simon Fraser	1–0 (5OT)	Lindenwood
2001; Details	St. Charles, Missouri	Westmont (3)	1–0	Oklahoma City
2002; Details	St. Charles, Missouri	Westmont (4)	2–1	Azusa Pacific
2003; Details	Santa Barbara, California	Westmont (5)	2–1 (7OT)	Lindsey Wilson
2004; Details	Santa Barbara, California	Lindsey Wilson	2–0	Concordia (OR)
2005; Details	Olathe, Kansas	Martin Methodist	1–0	Lee (TN)
2006; Details	Olathe, Kansas	Lindsey Wilson (2)	2–1 (4OT)	Azusa Pacific
2007; Details	Daytona Beach, Florida	Martin Methodist (2)	2–1	Azusa Pacific
2008; Details	Daytona Beach, Florida	Lee (TN)	3–0	Concordia (OR)
2009; Details	Decatur, Alabama	Lee (TN) (2)	2–0	Point Loma Nazarene
2010; Details	Decatur, Alabama	Lee (TN) (3)	3–0	Hastings
2011; Details	Decatur, Alabama	Lee (TN) (4)	3–0	Concordia (OR)
2012; Details	Orange Beach, Alabama	Lindsey Wilson (3)	3–2	Olivet Nazarene
2013; Details	Orange Beach, Alabama	Concordia (OR)	1–0	Westmont
2014; Details	Orange Beach, Alabama	Lindsey Wilson (4)	3–0	Northwestern Ohio
2015; Details	Orange Beach, Alabama	Spring Arbor	3–0	Lindsey Wilson (KY)
2016; Details	Orange Beach, Alabama	Northwestern Ohio	1–0	Spring Arbor
2017; Details	Orange Beach, Alabama	Spring Arbor (2)	2–0	Benedictine (KS)
2018; Details	Orange Beach, Alabama	William Carey	1–0	Keiser
2019; Details	Orange Beach, Alabama	Keiser	2–0	Marian (IN)
2020 (Note: Championship rescheduled from fall 2020 to spring 2021 due to COVID-19.); Details	Foley, Alabama	Keiser (2)	2–1 (OT)	William Carey
2021; Details	Orange Beach, Alabama	Tennessee Southern (3)	3–3 (5–4 pen.)	William Carey
2022; Details	Orange Beach, Alabama	Spring Arbor (3)	1–0	Marian (IN)
2023; Details	Foley, Alabama	Cumberlands (KY)	1–1 (3–2 pen.)	William Carey
2024; Details	Pensacola, Florida	SCAD	4–1	Keiser
2025; Details	Pensacola, Florida	Keiser (3)	1–1 (3–2 pen.)	Cumberlands (KY)

== Champions ==
=== Active NAIA programs ===
Team	Titles	Years
Lindsey Wilson	4	2004, 2006, 2012, 2014
Tennessee Southern	3	2005, 2007, 2021
Spring Arbor	3	2015, 2017, 2022
Keiser	3	2019, 2020, 2025
SCAD	1	2024
Cumberlands (KY)	1	2023
William Carey	1	2018
Northwestern Ohio	1	2016
Mobile	1	1997

=== Former NAIA programs ===
Team	Titles	Years
Westmont	5	1985, 1999, 2001, 2002, 2003
Lee (TN) (Note: No longer NAIA members)	4	2008, 2009, 2010, 2011
Lynn	3	1992, 1994, 1995
Berry (GA)	3	1987, 1990, 1993
Pacific Lutheran	3	1988, 1989, 1991
Simon Fraser	2	1996, 2000
Saint Mary's (CA)	2	1984, 1986
Concordia Oregon	1	2013
Azusa Pacific	1	1998

== See also ==
- NAIA Men's Soccer Championship
- NCAA Women's Soccer Championships (Division I, Division II, Division III)
- NCAA Men's Soccer Championships (Division I, Division II, Division III)
