= NCAA Division III women's soccer tournament =

College soccer tournament

- Association: NCAA
- Sport: Women's college soccer
- Founded: 1986; 40 years ago
- Division: Division III
- No. of teams: 64
- Country: United States
- Most recent champion: Washington St. Louis (3rd)
- Most titles: Messiah (6)
- Website: NCAA.com

The NCAA Division III women's soccer tournament is an annual event that is organized by the National Collegiate Athletic Association to determine the national champions of women's collegiate soccer among its Division III members are in the United States. It has been held every year since 1986, except for 2020.

Traditionally, the tournament is held in November and December of each year following the end of the regular season. Originally, the tournament finals were held on the campus of one of the teams participating in the semifinals. Since 2004, however, it has been held at a predetermined neutral site.

The most successful program has been Messiah, with six national titles.

The current champions are Washington St. Louis, who won their third national title in 2025.

== Champions ==
NCAA Division III Women's Soccer Championship
Year	Site (Host Team[s])	Championship			Semifinalists
Year	Site (Host Team[s])	Champion	Score	Runner-up	Semifinalists
1986; Details	Cortland, NY (SUNY Cortland)	Rochester	1–0	Plymouth State	UC San Diego & Cortland
1987; Details	Rochester, NY (Rochester)	Rochester (2)	1–0	William Smith	Plymouth State & St. Thomas (MN)
1988; Details	Geneva, NY (William Smith)	William Smith	1–0	UC San Diego	Ithaca & Methodist
1989; Details	San Diego, CA (UC San Diego)	UC San Diego	3–2 (3OT)	Ithaca	St. Thomas (MN) & William Smith
1990; Details	Cortland, NY (Cortland State)	Ithaca	1–0 (4OT)	Cortland	Saint Benedict & Methodist
1991; Details	Plymouth, NH (Plymouth State)	Ithaca (2)	2–0	Rochester (NY)	UC San Diego & Plymouth State
1992; Details	Fredericksburg, VA (Mary Washington)	Cortland	1–0	UMass Dartmouth	UC San Diego & Mary Washington
1993; Details	Geneva, NY (William Smith)	Trenton State	4–0	Plymouth State	UC San Diego & William Smith
1994; Details	San Diego, CA (UC San Diego)	Trenton State (2)	4–3 (3OT)	UC San Diego	Geneseo & North Carolina Wesleyan
1995; Details	Galloway, NJ (Richard Stockton)	UC San Diego (2)	3–0	Methodist	William Smith & Richard Stockton
1996; Details	Amherst, MA (Amherst)	UC San Diego (3)	2–1	TCNJ	Chicago & Amherst
1997; Details	Elizabethtown, PA (Elizabethtown)	UC San Diego (4)	1–0	William Smith	Elizabethtown & Washington St. Louis
1998; Details	Ithaca, NY (Ithaca)	Macalester	1–0 (4OT)	TCNJ	Ithaca & Willamette
1999; Details	Williamstown, MA (Williams)	UC San Diego (5)	1–0	Macalester	Williams & TCNJ
2000; Details	Medford, MA (Tufts)	TCNJ (3)	2–1	Tufts	Wisconsin–Stevens Point & Trinity (TX)
2001; Details	Delaware, OH (Ohio Wesleyan)	Ohio Wesleyan	1–0	Amherst	Wheaton (IL) & Willamette
2002; Details	Geneva, NY (William Smith)	Ohio Wesleyan (2)	1–0	Messiah	William Smith & Trinity (TX)
2003; Details	Oneonta, NY (SUNY Oneonta)	SUNY Oneonta	2–1 (OT)	Chicago	DePauw & TCNJ
2004; Details	Greensboro, NC	Wheaton (IL)	1–1 (5–4, pen)	Puget Sound	Wheaton (MA) & Messiah
2005; Details	Greensboro, NC	Messiah	1–0	TCNJ	Chicago & Tufts
2006; Details	Lake Buena Vista, FL	Wheaton (IL) (2)	2–0	TCNJ	Messiah & Virginia Wesleyan
2007; Details	Lake Buena Vista, FL	Wheaton (IL) (3)	1–0	Messiah	TCNJ & Western Connecticut State
2008; Details	Greensboro, NC	Messiah (2)	5–0	Wheaton (IL)	William Smith & Williams
2009; Details	San Antonio, TX	Messiah (3)	1–0	Washington St. Louis	TCNJ & Lynchburg
2010; Details	San Antonio, TX	Hardin–Simmons	2–1	Messiah	Otterbein & William Smith
2011; Details	San Antonio, TX	Messiah (4)	3–1	Wheaton (IL)	Ithaca & William Smith
2012; Details	San Antonio, TX	Messiah (5)	1–0	Emory	Wheaton (IL) & Misericordia
2013; Details	San Antonio, TX	William Smith (2)	2–0	Trinity (TX)	Capital & Middlebury
2014; Details	Kansas City, MO	Lynchburg	0–0 (4–3, pen)	Williams	Illinois Wesleyan & Johns Hopkins
2015; Details	Kansas City, MO	Williams	2–1	Washington St. Louis	Centre & Messiah
2016; Details	Salem, VA	Washington St. Louis	1–1 (5–4, pen)	Messiah	Brandeis & Chicago
2017; Details	Salem, VA	Williams (2)	1-0	Chicago	TCNJ & Hardin–Simmons
2018; Details	Greensboro, NC	Williams (3)	1–1 (3–2, pen)	Middlebury	Christopher Newport & Washington St. Louis
2019; Details	Greensboro, NC	Messiah (6)	1-0	William Smith	Pomona-Pitzer & Carnegie Mellon
2020	None	Not played due to COVID-19			None
2021; Details	Greensboro, NC (UNC Greensboro)	Christopher Newport	2–0	TCNJ	Loras & Wesleyan (CT)
2022; Details	Salem, VA (Roanoke)	Johns Hopkins	2-1	Case Western Reserve	Virginia Wesleyan & Messiah
2023; Details	Salem, VA (ODAC)	Cal Lutheran	1–0	Washington St. Louis	Messiah & Tufts
2024; Details	Las Vegas, NV (UNLV)	Washington St. Louis (2)	3–0	William Smith	Christopher Newport & Emory
2025; Details	Salem, VA (ODAC)	Washington St. Louis (3)	2–1	Emory	Chicago & Tufts
2026	Columbus, OH (Capital)				
2027	Pittsburgh, PA (Presidents' Athletic Conference)				

== Cumulative results ==
Team	Titles	Years
Messiah	6	2005, 2008, 2009, 2011, 2012, 2019
Williams	3	2015, 2017, 2018
TCNJ (Trenton State)	3	1993, 1994, 2000
Washington St. Louis	3	2016, 2024, 2025
Wheaton (IL)	3	2004, 2006, 2007
Ithaca	2	1990, 1991
Ohio Wesleyan	2	2001, 2002
Rochester	2	1986, 1987
William Smith	2	1988, 2013
Cal Lutheran	1	2023
Johns Hopkins	1	2022
Christopher Newport	1	2021
Lynchburg	1	2014
Cortland	1	1992
Hardin–Simmons	1	2010
Oneonta	1	2003
Macalester	1	1998

=== Former programs ===
Team	Titles	Years
UC San Diego ^{D1}	5	1989, 1995, 1996, 1997, 1999

== See also ==
- AIAW Intercollegiate Women's Soccer Championship
- NCAA Women's Soccer Championships (Division I, Division II)
- NCAA Men's Soccer Championships (Division I, Division II, Division III)
- NAIA Women's Soccer Championship
- Intercollegiate Soccer Football Association
