= List of NCAA Division I men's soccer coaches =

This is a list of NCAA Division I men's soccer coaches.

Conference affiliations are current for the ongoing 2026 NCAA soccer season.

== America East Conference ==
As of January 8, 2026

Program	Head coach	First season
Albany	Trevor Gorman	2011
Binghamton	Paul Marco	2002
Bryant	Ruben Resendes	2023
New Hampshire	Rich Weinrebe	2024
NJIT	Fernando Barboto	2016
UMass Lowell	Kyle Zenoni	2022
UMBC	Anthony Adams	2023
Vermont	Adrian Dubois	2026

== American Conference ==
As of January 13, 2026

Program	Head coach	First season
Charlotte	Kevin Langan	2012
FIU	Kyle Russell	2020
Florida Atlantic	Joey Worthen	2017
Memphis	Richard Mulrooney	2014
Missouri State	Michael Seabolt	2022
South Florida	George Kiefer	2026
Temple	Bryan Green	2023
Tulsa	Tom McIntosh	1995
UAB	David Lilly	2024

== Atlantic 10 Conference ==
As of February 4, 2026

Program	Head coach	First season
Davidson	Mike Babst	2019
Dayton	Dennis Currier	2005
Duquesne	Chase Brooks	2013
Fordham	Carlo Acquista	2019
George Mason	Rich Costanzo	2022
George Washington	Matt Watts	2026
La Salle	Taylor Thames	2022
Loyola Chicago	Kevin Robson	2026
Rhode Island	Gareth Elliott	2013
St. Bonaventure	Mick Giordano	2025
Saint Joseph's	Tim Mulqueen	2025
Saint Louis	Kevin Kalish	2018
VCU	Dave Giffard	2010

== Atlantic Coast Conference ==
As of February 7, 2026

Program	Head coach	First season
Boston College	Bob Thompson	2020
California	Leonard Griffin	2022
Clemson	Mike Noonan	2010
Duke	John Kerr	2008
Louisville	John Michael Hayden	2019
NC State	Marc Hubbard	2024
North Carolina	Carlos Somoano	2011
Notre Dame	Chad Riley	2018
Pittsburgh	Jay Vidovich	2016
SMU	Kevin Hudson	2015
Stanford	Jeremy Gunn	2012
Syracuse	Ian McIntyre	2010
Virginia	George Gelnovatch	1996
Virginia Tech	Mike Brizendine	2009
Wake Forest	Bobby Muuss	2015

== Atlantic Sun Conference ==
As of April 8, 2026

Program	Head coach	First season
Bellarmine	Matt Cannady	2026
Central Arkansas	Kyle Segebart	2025
Florida Gulf Coast	Oliver Twelvetrees	2025
Jacksonville	Ali Simmons	2023
Lipscomb	Charles Morrow	2005
North Florida	Marlon Montanella	2026
Queens	Oliver Carias	2011
Stetson	Emmett Rutkowski	2020
West Florida	Bill Elliott	1995

== Big East Conference ==
As of February 19, 2026

Program	Head coach	First season
Akron	Jared Embick	2013
Butler	Ian Sarachan	2026
Creighton	Johnny Torres	2019
DePaul	Mark Plotkin	2018
Georgetown	Brian Wiese	2006
Marquette	David Korn	2024
Providence	Craig Stewart	2012
Seton Hall	Andreas Lindberg	2018
St. John's	David Masur	1991
UConn	Chris Gbandi	2022
Villanova	Mark Fetrow	2023
Xavier	John Higgins	2022

== Big South Conference ==
As of February 19, 2026

Program	Head coach	First season
Gardner–Webb	Jonathan Lagos	2026
High Point	Zach Haines	2019
Longwood	Paul Gilbert	2024
Presbyterian	Nick Finotti	2023
Radford	Andy Cormack	2026
UNC Asheville	Danny Frid	2025
USC Upstate	Michael Antoniewicz	2024
Winthrop	Dale Parker	2026

== Big Ten Conference ==
As of February 19, 2026

Program	Head coach	First season
Indiana	Todd Yeagley	2010
Maryland	Sasho Cirovski	1993
Michigan	Chaka Daley	2012
Michigan State	Damon Rensing	2009
Northwestern	Russell Payne	2021
Ohio State	Brian Maisonneuve	2018
Penn State	Jeff Cook	2018
Rutgers	Jim McElderry	2019
UCLA	Ryan Jorden	2019
Washington	Jamie Clark	2011
Wisconsin	Neil Jones	2022

== Big West Conference ==
As of March 30, 2026

Program	Head coach	First season
Cal State Fullerton	George Kuntz	2014
Cal State Northridge	Terry Davila	1999
CSU Bakersfield	Adam Grant	2023
Sacramento State	Michael Linenberger	1989
UC Irvine	Yossi Raz	2017
UC Santa Barbara	Tim Vom Steeg	1999
Utah Valley	Michael Chesler	2026

== Coastal Athletic Association ==
As of January 6, 2025

Program	Head coach	First season
Campbell	Dustin Fonder	2015
Charleston	Keith Wiggans	2020
Drexel	Michael Marchiano	2020
Elon	Marc Reeves	2017
Hofstra	Richard Nuttall	1989
Monmouth	Robert McCourt	2004
Northeastern	Jeremy Bonomo	2024
Stony Brook	Ryan Anatol	2011
UNC Wilmington	Aidan Heaney	2001
William & Mary	Chris Norris	2004

== Horizon League ==
As of December 20, 2025

Program	Head coach	First season
Cleveland State	Siniša Ubiparipović	2019
Detroit Mercy	Nate Kopunek	2023
Green Bay	John O'Reilly	2024
IU Indy	Sid van Druenen	2022
Milwaukee	Kris Kelderman	2012
Northern Illinois	Ryan Swan	2017
Northern Kentucky	Sean Teepen	2026
Oakland	Paul Doroh	2024
Purdue Fort Wayne	Stephen Gorton	2020
Robert Morris	Jonathan Potter	2023
Wright State	Alex Van der Sluijss	2022

== Ivy League ==
As of June 2, 2023

Program	Head coach	First season
Brown	Chase Wileman	2022
Columbia	Kevin Anderson	2009
Cornell	John Smith	2016
Dartmouth	Bo Oshoniyi	2018
Harvard	Josh Shapiro	2020
Penn	Brian Gill	2018
Princeton	Jim Barlow	1996
Yale	Kylie Stannard	2015

== Metro Conference ==
As of July 1, 2026

Program	Head coach	First season
Canisius	Michael Tanke	2022
Fairfield	Krystian Witkowski	2024
Iona	James Hamilton	2016
Manhattan	Tom Giovatto	2025
Marist	Matt Viggiano	2007
Merrimack	Tony Martone	1982
Mount St. Mary's	Brett Teach	2024
Niagara	Bill Boyle	2016
Quinnipiac	Eric Da Costa	2005
Rider	Chad Duernberger	2023
Sacred Heart	Anthony Anzevui	2022
Saint Peter's	Julian Richens	2011
Siena	Graciano Brito	2020

== Missouri Valley Conference ==
As of October 25, 2024

Program	Head coach	First season
Belmont	David Costa	2019
Bowling Green	Eric Nichols	2009
Bradley	Jim DeRose	1996
Drake	Pat Flinn	2022
Evansville	Marshall Ray	2015
UIC	Sean Phillips	2010
Western Michigan	Chad Wiseman	2013

== Mountain West Conference ==
As of December 20, 2025

Program	Head coach	First season
Air Force	Greg Dalby	2025
Grand Canyon	Jamie Davies	2026
San Jose State	Simon Tobin	2014
UC Davis	Dwayne Shaffer	1997
UNLV	B.J. Craig	2022
Utah Tech	Jonny Broadhead	2017

== NEC ==
As of December 20, 2025

Program	Head coach	First season
Central Connecticut	David Kelly	2020
Chicago State	Norris Howze	2022
Fairleigh Dickinson	Jaymee Highcock	2024
Howard	Phillip Gyau	2014
Le Moyne	Callum Donnelly	2024
LIU	Michael Mordocco	2019 (Note: The 2019 season was the first for the current Long Island University athletic program, following the merger of LIU's former athletic programs—the Division I LIU Brooklyn Blackbirds and the Division II LIU Post Pioneers, both of which sponsored men's soccer. Mordocco originally joined LIU in 2018 as the Post men's soccer head coach.)
Mercyhurst	Austin Solomon	2023
New Haven	Tom Mattera	2023
Stonehill	Jim Reddish	2008

== Ohio Valley Conference ==
As of December 20, 2025

Program	Head coach	First season
Eastern Illinois	Ruy Vaz	2025
Houston Christian	Ryan Pratt	2017
Incarnate Word	Kiki Lara	2020
Lindenwood	Kris Bertsch	2023
SIU Edwardsville	Cale Wassermann	2019
Southern Indiana	Mat Santoro	2009
UTRGV	Bryheem Hancock	2020
Western Illinois	Eric Johnson	1997

== Pac-12 Conference ==
As of March 30, 2026

Program	Head coach	First season
Cal Poly	Oige Kennedy	2023
California Baptist	Coe Michaelson	2016
Gonzaga	Chris McGaughey	2026
Oregon State	Jarred Brookins	2025
San Diego State	Ryan Hopkins	2020
UC Riverside	Tim Cupello	2013
UC San Diego	Jon Pascale	2008

== Patriot League ==
As of December 23, 2025

Program	Head coach	First season
American	Zach Samol	2019
Army	Brian Plotkin	2021
Boston University	Kevin Nylen	2020
Bucknell	Dave Brandt	2022
Colgate	Erik Ronning	2005
Holy Cross	Matt Brown	2024
Lafayette	Dennis Bohn	2001
Lehigh	Dean Koski	1991
Loyola (MD)	Steve Nichols	2014
Navy	John Hackworth	2026

== Southern Conference ==
As of December 20, 2025

Program	Head coach	First season
East Tennessee State	Allen Vital	2024
Furman	Doug Allison	1995
Liberty	Scott Wells	2026
Mercer	Brad Ruzzo	2008
UNC Greensboro	Chris Rich	2019
VMI	Nick Regan	2022
Wofford	Ryan Osborne	2025

== Summit League ==
As of December 20, 2025

Program	Head coach	First season
Delaware	Tommy McMenemy	2022
Kansas City	Ryan Pore	2020
Omaha	Donovan Dowling	2022
Oral Roberts	Ryan Bush	2013
St. Thomas	Jon Lowery	2012
UMass	Fran O'Leary	2015

== Sun Belt Conference ==
As of December 23, 2025

Program	Head coach	First season
Coastal Carolina	Adam Perron	2026
Georgia Southern	Lee Squires	2023
Georgia State	Brett Surrency	2010
James Madison	Paul Zazenski	2018
Kentucky	Johan Cedergren	2012
Marshall	Chris Grassie	2017
Old Dominion	Tennant McVea	2024
South Carolina	Tony Annan	2021
UCF	Scott Calabrese	2017
West Virginia	Dan Stratford	2020

== West Coast Conference ==
As of December 22, 2025

Program	Head coach	First season
Denver	Jamie Franks	2015
Loyola Marymount	Kyle Schmid	2022
Pacific	Andres Ochoa	2026
Portland	Nick Carlin-Voigt	2016
Saint Mary's	Adam Cooper	2006
San Diego	Brian Quinn	2018
San Francisco	Chris Brown	2021
Santa Clara	Cameron Rast	2002
Seattle	Nate Daligcon	2023

== See also ==
- List of current NCAA Division I baseball coaches
- List of current NCAA Division I men's basketball coaches
- List of current NCAA Division I women's basketball coaches
- List of current NCAA Division I FBS football coaches
- List of current NCAA Division I FCS football coaches
- List of current NCAA Division I men's ice hockey coaches
