= Jon Pascale =

American soccer coach

Current position
- Title: Head coach
- Team: UC San Diego
- Conference: Pac-12

Biographical details
- Born: 1975 or 1976
- Education: American University

Playing career
- 1994–1997: American Eagles

Coaching career (HC unless noted)
- 1998–2000: Penn Quakers (assistant)
- 2001–2005: Georgetown Hoyas (associate)
- 2006–2007: Stanford Cardinal (assistant)
- 2008–: UC San Diego Tritons

Head coaching record
- Overall: 153–109–57 (.569)

Accomplishments and honors

Championships
- CCAA regular season and tournament (2016)

Jon Pascale (born 1975 or 1976) is an American former soccer player and a coach who is currently the head coach for the UC San Diego Tritons men's soccer program.

== Career ==
=== Playing career ===
Pascale played college soccer at American University from 1993 through 1997. He was part of the American University team that reached the quarterfinals of the 1997 NCAA Division I men's soccer tournament.

=== Coaching career ===
Upon graduating from American University with a degree in Elementary Education, Pascale opted to go into coaching. He began his coaching career in 1998 at the University of Pennsylvania under Rudy Fuller. There, spent three seasons as an assistant coach. After the 2000 season, Pascale accepted an associate head coaching role with Georgetown University. In 2004, Pascale was promoted to Associate Head Coach.

In 2006, after five seasons with Georgetown, Pascale accepted a head coaching job with Stanford University. Pascale remained part of Stanford's team for the 2006 and 2007 seasons.

On January 23, 2008, Pascale was hired as the head coach for the UC San Diego Tritons men's soccer program. In four of his first five seasons in charge, Pascale lead the program to a winning record. In 2013, Pascale lead the Tritons to their first ever NCAA Division II men's soccer tournament since 2003. There, the Tritons reached the round of 16 for the first time since 1994. UC San Diego returned to the NCAA tournament in 2014 where they were eliminated in the opening round.

The program's most successful season since their dynasty in the late 1980s and early 1990s came in 2016, when the program reached the Division II College Cup (semifinals) for the first time since their 1993 national championship. There, the UC San Diego was eliminated by eventual national champions, Wingate.

Pascale guided the program to their transition from Division II to Division I, where they have had less success since joining the Division I ranks. As of 2026, their best season was an 8–8–2 season. They have yet to qualify for a Division I conference soccer tournament, let alone the NCAA Division I men's soccer tournament.

== Head coaching record ==
Record table
| Season | Team | Overall | Conference | Standing | Postseason |
|---|---|---|---|---|---|
UC San Diego (CCAA) (2008–2019)
| 2008 | UC San Diego | 10–6–2 | 6–6–2 | 4th | |
| 2009 | UC San Diego | 7–9–4 | 4–9–3 | 5th | |
| 2010 | UC San Diego | 8–6–4 | 8–5–3 | 4th | |
| 2011 | UC San Diego | 10–8–0 | 9–7–0 | 3rd | |
| 2012 | UC San Diego | 9–4–4 | 8–3–4 | 3rd | |
| 2013 | UC San Diego | 14–3–5 | 11–2–3 | 2nd | CCAA runners-up NCAA D-II round of 16 |
| 2014 | UC San Diego | 10–4–6 | 5–2–4 | T−3rd | CCAA first round NCAA D-II first round |
| 2015 | UC San Diego | 6–6–6 | 5–3–4 | T−5th | CCAA first round |
| 2016 | UC San Diego | 19–3–2 | 9–2–1 | 1st | CCAA champions NCAA D-II semifinals |
| 2017 | UC San Diego | 10–2–5 | 7–1–3 | 3rd | CCAA first round |
| 2018 | UC San Diego | 13–4–2 | 7–3–2 | 6th | CCAA first round |
| 2019 | UC San Diego | 14–6–0 | 8–3–0 | 3rd | CCAA semifinals NCAA D-II first round |
UC San Diego (Big West) (2020–2025)
| 2020 | UC San Diego | 0–0–0 | 0–0–0 | — | Ineligible |
| 2021 | UC San Diego | 5–11–0 | 2–7–0 | 9th | Ineligible |
| 2022 | UC San Diego | 8–8–2 | 4–5–0 | 8th | Ineligible |
| 2023 | UC San Diego | 4–11–3 | 3–5–1 | 8th | Ineligible |
| 2024 | UC San Diego | 4–9–5 | 3–5–1 | 8th | |
| 2025 | UC San Diego | 2–9–7 | 2–2–5 | 6th | |
UC San Diego (Pac-12) (2026–present)
| 2026 | UC San Diego | 0–0–0 | 0–0–0 | — | — |
| UC San Diego: | | 153–109–57 (.569) | 101–70–36 (.575) | | |
| Total: | | 153–109–57 (.569) | | | |
National champion Postseason invitational champion Conference regular season champion Conference regular season and conference tournament champion Division regular season champion Division regular season and conference tournament champion Conference tournament champion
