= 2012 Michigan Wolverines men's soccer team =

Michigan Wolverines
2012 season
- Head Coach: Chaka Daley
- Stadium: U-M Soccer Stadium
- Big Ten: 3rd (3–2–1)
- Big Ten Tournament: Runner-up
- NCAA Tournament: 2nd round

2012 Big Ten Conference men's soccer standings
	Conf.					Overall
Team	W		L		T	W		L		T
Penn State	3	–	1	–	2	9	–	5	–	3
No. 18 Northwestern	3	–	1	–	2	13	–	6	–	4
Michigan	3	–	2	–	1	11	–	10	–	1
No. 1 Indiana	3	–	2	–	1	16	–	5	–	3
Michigan State†	3	–	3	–	0	11	–	10	–	1
Wisconsin	1	–	3	–	2	6	–	8	–	5
Ohio State	0	–	4	–	2	6	–	10	–	3
As of December 11, 2012; Rankings from NSCAA

The 2012 Michigan Wolverines men's soccer team was the college's 13th season of playing organized men's college soccer. It was the Wolverines' 13th season playing in the Big Ten Conference.

== Background ==
In the 2011 regular season Michigan went 5–14–1 with a conference record of 1–5–0. In the Big Ten Tournament Michigan lost to Wisconsin in the quarterfinals. The team did not advance to the NCAA Tournament.

== Roster ==
Note: Flags indicate national team as defined under FIFA eligibility rules; some limited exceptions apply. Players may hold more than one non-FIFA nationality.

No.	Pos.	Nation	Player
1	GK	USA	Adam Grinwis
4	MF	USA	Dylan Mencia
5	MF	USA	Jack Brown
6	DF	CAN	Kofi Opare
7	MF	USA	Tyler Arnone
9	FW	ENG	James Murphy
10	MF	BRA	Fabio Pereira
11	MF	USA	Ezekiel Harris
12	MF	USA	Nick Lewin
13	DF	USA	Ben Manko
14	MF	USA	Noble Sullivan
15	DF	USA	Brian Klemczak

No.	Pos.	Nation	Player
16	FW	USA	T.J. Roehn
17	MF	USA	Colin McAtee
18	GK	USA	Alec Dockser
19	MF	USA	Jason Stacy
20	FW	USA	Malcolm Miller
21	MF	USA	Latif Alashe
22	MF	USA	T.J. VanSlooten
23	MF	USA	Etienne Lussiez
24	DF	USA	Zach Hager
25	DF	USA	Alex Landschulz
26	MF	USA	Tyler Leppek
32	GK	USA	Nick Iacobellis

== Competitions ==
=== Regular season ===
August 24 1	USF	2–1	Michigan	Tampa, Florida
7:00 pm ET		Report		Stadium: Corbett Stadium; Attendance: 3,076; Referee: Lance Van Haitsma

August 31 2	Michigan	3–0	Vermont	Ann Arbor, Michigan
7:00 pm ET		Report		Stadium: U-M Soccer Stadium; Attendance: 918; Referee: Brent Sorg

September 2 3	Michigan	0–3	Cleveland State	Ann Arbor, Michigan
4:00 pm ET		Report		Stadium: U-M Soccer Stadium; Attendance: 933; Referee: Brent Sorg

September 9 4	Michigan	4–1	Northeastern	Ann Arbor, Michigan
2:00 pm ET		Report		Stadium: U-M Soccer Stadium; Attendance: 597; Referee: Nikola Aleksic

September 14 5	Marquette	2–1	Michigan	Milwaukee, Wisconsin
7:05 pm ET		Report		Stadium: Valley Fields; Attendance: 651; Referee: Dave Jaworski

September 16 6	Michigan	0–1	Notre Dame	Ann Arbor, Michigan
2:00 pm ET		Report		Stadium: U-M Soccer Stadium; Attendance: 997; Referee: Abbey Okulaja

September 23 7	Northwestern	2–0	Michigan	Evanston, Illinois
3:00 pm ET		Report		Stadium: Lakeside Field; Attendance: 709; Referee: Pawel Wydra

September 30 8	Michigan	3–2	Ohio State	Ann Arbor, Michigan
6:00 pm ET		Report		Stadium: U-M Soccer Stadium; Attendance: 1,402; Referee: Elias Bazakos

October 6 9	Michigan	1–1	Penn State	Ann Arbor, Michigan
7:00 pm ET		Report		Stadium: U-M Soccer Stadium; Attendance: 737; Referee: Thomas McCulloh

October 9 10	Michigan	1–0	Oakland	Ann Arbor, Michigan
7:00 pm ET		Report		Stadium: U-M Soccer Stadium; Attendance: 578; Referee: Christopher Koloffon

October 13 11	Wisconsin	2–1	Michigan	Madison, Wisconsin
7:00 pm ET		Report		Stadium: McClimon Complex; Attendance: 446; Referee: Jorge Cuate

October 16 12	Akron	1–0	Michigan	Akron, Ohio
7:30 pm ET		Report		Stadium: FirstEnergy Stadium; Attendance: 3,289; Referee: Abbey Okulaja

October 19 13	Indiana	1–2	Michigan	Bloomington, Indiana
7:30 pm ET		Report		Stadium: Armstrong Stadium; Attendance: 1,514; Referee: Pawel Wydra

October 23 14	Michigan	0–2	Bowling Green	Ann Arbor, Michigan
7:00 pm ET		Report		Stadium: U-M Soccer Stadium; Attendance: 615; Referee: Christopher Koloffon

October 27 15	Michigan	1–0	Valparaiso	Ann Arbor, Michigan
2:00 pm ET		Report		Stadium: U-M Soccer Stadium; Attendance: 614; Referee: David Esshaki

October 30 16	Michigan	2–1	Detroit Mercy	Ann Arbor, Michigan
7:00 pm ET		Report		Stadium: U-M Soccer Stadium; Attendance: 504; Referee: Connor Williams

November 3 17	Michigan	1–0	Michigan State	Ann Arbor, Michigan
7:00 pm ET		Report		Stadium: U-M Soccer Stadium; Attendance: 2,225; Referee: Pawel Wydra

=== Big Ten Tournament ===
November 7 QF	Michigan	1–0	Wisconsin	Evanston, Illinois
3:30 pm ET		Report		Stadium: Lakeside Field; Attendance: 0 Referee: Cien Asoera

November 9 SF	Northwestern	0–3	Michigan	Evanston, Illinois
2:30 pm ET		Report		Stadium: Lakeside Field; Attendance: 382; Referee: Sorin Stoica

November 11 F	Michigan	1–2	Michigan State	Evanston, Illinois
12:00 pm ET		Report		Stadium: Lakeside Field; Attendance: 406; Referee: Jorge Cuate

=== NCAA Tournament ===
November 15 1st round	Michigan	3–1	Niagara	Ann Arbor, Michigan
7:00 pm ET		Report		Stadium: U-M Soccer Stadium; Attendance: 516; Referee: Shane Butler

November 18 2nd round	Akron	2–1	Michigan	Akron, Ohio
4:30 pm ET		Report		Stadium: FirstEnergy Stadium; Attendance: 3,264; Referee: Edvin Jurisevic

== See also ==
- 2012 Big Ten Conference men's soccer season
- 2012 Big Ten Conference Men's Soccer Tournament
- 2012 NCAA Division I Men's Soccer Championship
