= UC San Diego Tritons men's soccer =

UC San Diego's men's soccer team

- Founded: 1975; 51 years ago
- University: University of California, San Diego
- Head coach: Jon Pascale (19th season)
- Conference: Pac-12
- Location: La Jolla, California
- Stadium: Triton Soccer Stadium (capacity: 750)
- Nickname: Tritons
- Colors: Blue and gold
Home	Away

NCAA tournament championships
- 1988, 1991, 1993

NCAA tournament Semifinals
- 1989, 2016

NCAA tournament Quarterfinals
- 1985, 1990, 1994

NCAA tournament Round of 16
- 2013

NCAA tournament appearances
- 1983, 1984, 1985, 1986, 1987, 1988, 1989, 1990, 1991, 1993, 1994, 1995, 1996, 1997, 1999, 2003, 2013, 2014, 2016, 2019

The UC San Diego Tritons men's soccer is the NCAA Division I college soccer team that represents the University of California, San Diego. In the upcoming 2026 season, the Tritons will compete as an affiliate member of the Pac-12 Conference under the terms of an agreement between the Pac-12 and UCSD's full-time home of the Big West Conference (BWC). In July 2027, UCSD will leave the Big West for the West Coast Conference, which sponsors the sport.

The University first fielded a soccer team in 1975, being coached by Rod Gieger (who spent only a season with the squad). UC San Diego finished their debut season with a 6–3–1 record. The team is currently coached by Jon Pascale, who has been in charge since 2008.

The Tritons have won the NCAA Division III tournament on three occasions, the last in 1993.

UC San Diego moved to Division II for the 2000–01 season. In July 2020, UC San Diego joined the Big West Conference (along with Cal State Long Beach and Cal State Bakersfield) as part of the University's transition to Division I. UC San Diego started participating in the Big West soccer tournament since the 2020–21 season.

The UC San Diego men's soccer team hosts its opponents at Triton Soccer Stadium at RIMAC Sports Center. In 2003, 2013, and 2014, it advanced to the first round of the NCAA West Regional. In 2013, they were the CCAA tournament runners-up. The best season in team history occurred in 2016, when the team advanced to the NCAA D-II tournament semifinals after claiming the CCAA league championship, CCAA tournament championship, and the NCAA West Region title.

== Players ==
=== Current roster ===
As of December 2025

Note: Flags indicate national team as defined under FIFA eligibility rules; some limited exceptions apply. Players may hold more than one non-FIFA nationality.

No.	Pos.	Nation	Player
00	GK	USA	Nic Thiele
0	GK	USA	Dylan Huy
1	GK	USA	Nolan Premack
2	DF	USA	Evan Wellerstein
3	DF	USA	Nate Morgan
4	MF	USA	Gary Green
5	DF	USA	Nolan Sanchez
6	MF	NZL	Adam Hillis
7	MF	USA	Bryce Barnum
8	MF	USA	Cole Barrett
9	FW	USA	Ryan Namdar
10	MF	USA	Quinn Sellers
11	FW	USA	Brian Arens

No.	Pos.	Nation	Player
12	MF	USA	James Redington
13	MF	USA	Max Pulvers
14	DF	USA	Liam Murdin
15	MF	USA	Masa Fujita
16	FW	USA	Gavin Allegaert
17	DF	USA	Keenai Braun
18	MF	USA	Mhone Bogonko
19	MF	USA	Woody Brown
20	FW	USA	Michael Luechauer
21	FW	USA	Jack Nishimoto
23	DF	USA	Kai Oppenheim
24	DF	USA	Nick Aghaian
25	MF	ENG	Tyler Cash

=== Records ===
Top scorers

#	Player	Tenure	Goals
1	Greg Schwarz	1983-86	44
2	Robert Paterson	1985-86	37
3	Chris Romey	1989-91, 1993	36
4	Matt Davey	2002-05	31
4	Carrick Brewster	1986-89	31
5	Scott Rommel	1987-89	29

Most assistances

#	Player	Tenure	Assist.
1	Thien Nguyen	1984-86, 1988	36
2	Matt Davey	2002-05	24
3	Brady Bernard	1997-00	23
4	Chris Hanssen	1988-91	22
5	Phil Kenney	1982-85	21

=== Professional players ===
Player	Pos.	Professional career (teams)	Ref.
(United States) Jake Serpa	DF	Los Angeles Force (NISA) (2023–)	

== Coaches ==
=== Current staff ===
Position	Name
Head coach	Jon Pascale
Assist. coach	Ryan Hernandez
Assist. coach	Michael D’Arrigo
Assist. coach	Brett Jones

=== Coaching history ===
#	Name	Seasons	Tenure	Record	Pct.
1	Rod Geiger	1	1975	6–3–1	.650
2	Ilan Rothmueller	1	1976	5–6–1	.458
3	Stewart Hayes	3	1977–79	15–25–3	.384
4	Tre Conrique	2	1980–81	9–19–2	.333
5	Derek Armstrong	26	1982-2007	326–138–48	.684
6	Jon Pascale	18	2008–pres.	153–109–57	.569

== Stadium ==
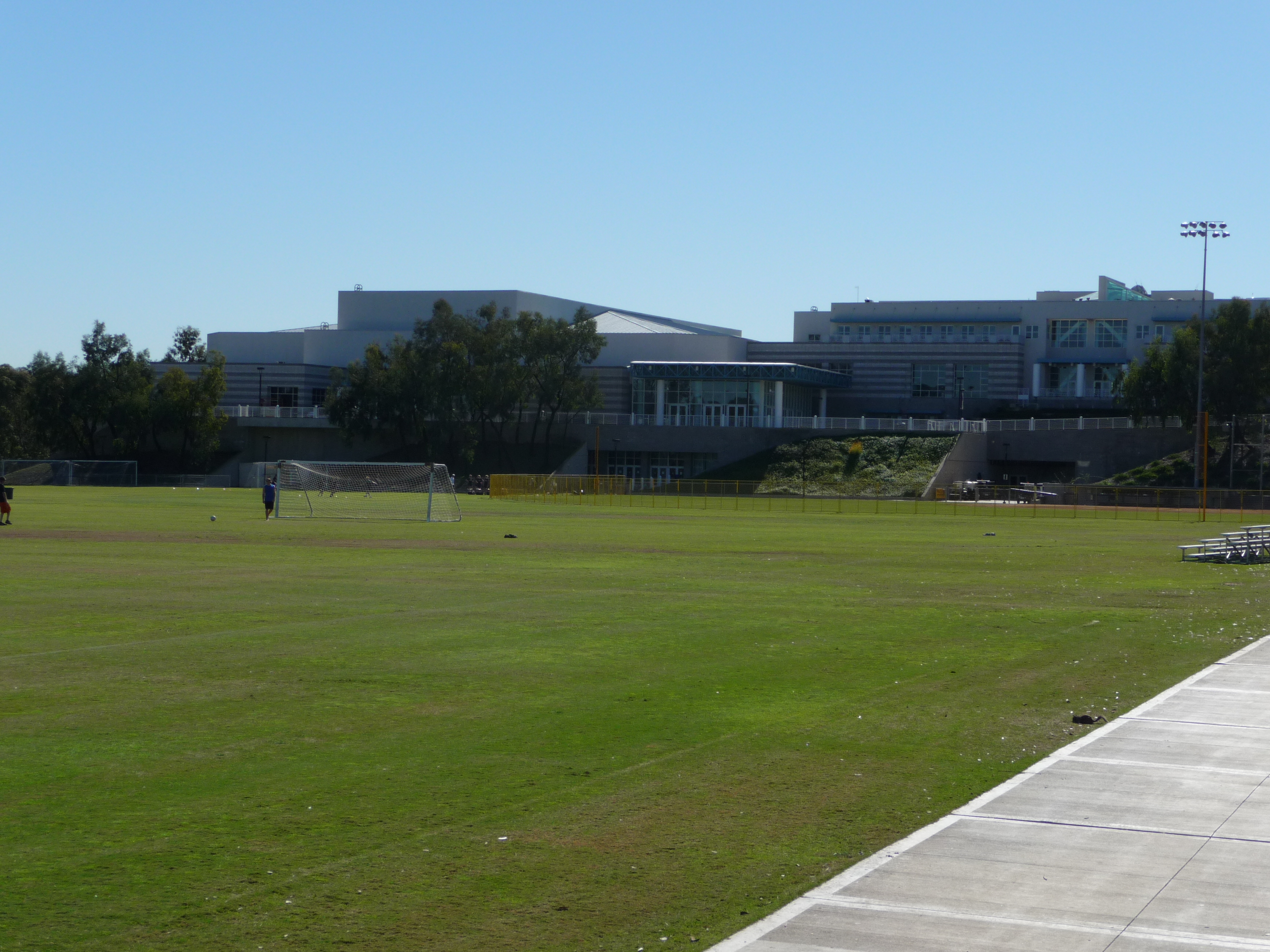
Soccer field at RIMAC Sports Complex as seen in 2011

UC San Diego play their home matches at the Triton Soccer Stadium, which is part of the RIMAC Sports Complex, opened in 1995. The stadium has a maximum capacity of 750, which can be expanded to 1,750 through the use of temporary bleachers for NCAA postseason fixtures. The venue is also used by the women's soccer team.

== Titles ==
=== National ===
Championship	Titles	Winning years
NCAA D-III tournament	3	1988, 1993, 1993

== Team statistics ==
=== NCAA appearances ===
UC San Diego's appearances in NCAA tournaments (D-III and D-II) through the years include:

Division III

Year	Stage
1983	West Regional
1984	West Regional
1985	Quarterfinals
1986	Runners-up
1987	West Regional
1988	Champions
1989	Semifinals
1990	Quarterfinals
1991	Champions
1993	Champions
1994	Quarterfinals
1995	West Regional
1996	West Regional
1997	First round
1999	First round

Division II

Year	Stage
2003	West Regional
2013	Third round
2014	First round
2016	Semifinals
2019	First round
