= 2016 NCAA Division II men's soccer tournament =

2016 NCAA Division II Men's Soccer Championship
Tournament details
- Country: United States
- Dates: November 10–December 3, 2016
- Teams: 38

Final positions
- Champions: Wingate (1st title, 1st final)
- Runners-up: Charleston (WV) (2nd final)
- Third place: UC San Diego; Rockhurst (MO)

Tournament statistics
- Matches played: 37
- Goals scored: 99 (2.68 per match)
- All statistics correct as of 12/1/2016.

The 2016 NCAA Division II Men's Soccer Championship was the 45th annual single-elimination tournament to determine the national champion of NCAA Division II men's collegiate soccer in the United States. The semifinals and championship game were played at Swope Soccer Village in Kansas City, Missouri from December 1–3, 2016 while the preceding rounds were played at various sites across the country during November 2016.

== Qualification ==
All Division II men's soccer programs were eligible to qualify for the 38-team tournament field. No teams received automatic bids; at-large bids are based on the teams' regular season records and the Quality of Winning Percentage Index. Teams were placed into one of four unbalanced super-regional brackets, consisting of eight or ten teams, based on geographic location.

School	Conference	Record
Adelphi (NY)	Northeast-10 Conference	18–1–0
Cal Poly Pomona	California Collegiate Athletic Association	12–5–2
Charleston (WV)	Mountain East Conference	16–2–1
Colorado Mesa	Rocky Mountain Athletic Conference	14–1–5
Dixie State (UT)	Pacific West Conference	15–3–0
Drury (MO)	Great Lakes Valley Conference	11–4–3
Florida Tech	Sunshine State Conference	10–4–1
Fort Hays State (KS)	Mid-America Intercollegiate Athletics Association	13–4–1
Franklin Pierce (NH)	Northeast-10 Conference	12–5–0
Lander (SC)	Peach Belt Conference	14–3–1
Le Moyne (NY)	Northeast-10 Conference	14–4–2
Lenoir–Rhyne (NC)	South Atlantic Conference	11–4–3
Limestone (SC)	Conference Carolinas	15–3–0
Lindenwood (MO)	Mid-America Intercollegiate Athletics Association	13–3–2
LIU Post (NY)	East Coast Conference	17–0–1
Lynn (FL)	Sunshine State Conference	12–7–0
Mercyhurst	Pennsylvania State Athletic Conference	15–4–1
Merrimack (MA)	Northeast-10 Conference	14–5–0
Midwestern State (TX)	Heartland Conference	16–3–1

School	Conference	Record
Palm Beach Atlantic	Sunshine State Conference	12–4–1
Pfeiffer (NC)	Conference Carolinas	18–2–0
Quincy (IL)	Great Lakes Valley Conference	12–5–2
Regis (CO)	Rocky Mountain Athletic Conference	14–4–1
Rockhurst (MO)	Great Lakes Valley Conference	16–2–2
Saginaw Valley State (MI)	Great Lakes Intercollegiate Athletic Conference	15–4–1
St. Edward's (TX)	Heartland Conference	17–2–1
Simon Fraser (BC)	Great Northwest Athletic Conference	14–1–2
Sonoma State	California Collegiate Athletic Association	10–4–5
Southern Indiana	Great Lakes Valley Conference	13–3–3
Southern New Hampshire	Northeast-10 Conference	11–4–2
Tampa	Sunshine State Conference	11–4–3
Tiffin (OH)	Great Lakes Intercollegiate Athletic Conference	14–4–2
Tusculum (TN)	South Atlantic Conference	16–3–0
UC San Diego	California Collegiate Athletic Association	16–2–2
Urbana (OH)	Mountain East Conference	13–4–1
West Chester	Pennsylvania State Athletic Conference	11–4–3
Western Washington	Great Northwest Athletic Conference	9–4–4
Wingate (NC)	South Atlantic Conference	14–1–0

== Tournament bracket ==
=== Super Region No. 1 ===
First Round; Thursday, November 10
4	Franklin Pierce	2
5	Merrimack	3
6	Southern N.H.	3
3	Le Moyne	1

Second Round; Saturday & Sunday, November 12 &13
1	LIU Post	1
5	Merrimack	0
6	Southern N.H.	0
2	Adelphi	1
1	Charleston	2
4	West Chester	0
3	Urbana	2
2	Mercyhurst	0

Third Round; Thursday, November 17
1	LIU Post	0
2	Adelphi	4
1	Charleston	2
3	Urbana	1

Quarterfinals; Saturday, November 19
2	Adelphi	2(3)
1	Charleston	2(5)

=== Super Region No. 2 ===
First Round; Friday, November 11
4	Southern Ind.	2(3)
5	Quincy	2(1)
6	Drury	2
3	Saginaw Valley St.	1

Second Round; Sunday, November 13
1	Rockhurst	3
4	Southern Ind.	1
6	Drury	2
2	Tiffin	1

Third Round; Friday, November 18
1	Rockhurst	1(5)
6	Drury	1(4)
1	Fort Hays State	1
2	Lindenwood	0

Quarterfinals; Sunday, November 20
1	Rockhurst	1
1	Fort Hays State	0

=== Super Region No. 3 ===
First Round; Thursday & Friday, November 10 & 11
4	Sonoma State	0
5	Cal Poly Pomona	2
6	Western Wash.	3
3	Dixie State	2

Second Round; Saturday & Sunday, November 12 &13
1	Simon Fraser	0(3)
5	Cal Poly Pomona	0(4)
3	Western Wash.	0
2	UC San Diego	2
1	St. Edward's	1
4	Regis	0
3	Colorado Mesa	0
2	Midwestern State	1

Third Round; Friday, November 18
5	Cal Poly Pomona	0
2	UC San Diego	1
1	St. Edward's	2
2	Midwestern State	3

Quarterfinals; Sunday, November 20
1	UC San Diego	2
2	Midwestern State	1

=== Super Region No. 4 ===
First Round; Thursday & Friday, November 10 & 11
4	Limestone	2
5	Lander	1
6	Lenoir-Rhyne	3
3	Tusculum	1

Second Round; Saturday & Sunday, November 12 &13
1	Lynn	0
4	Tampa	1
3	Florida Tech.	1
2	Palm Beach Atlantic	2
1	Wingate	3
4	Limestone	0
6	Lenoir-Rhyne	1
2	Pfeiffer	6

Third Round; Friday, November 18
4	Tampa	3
2	Palm Beach Atlantic	2
1	Wingate	1
2	Pfeiffer	0

Quarterfinals; Sunday, November 20
1	Tampa	0
1	Wingate	1

=== Division II College Cup ===
Semifinals; December 1, 2016; Swope Soccer Village; Kansas City, Missouri
Charleston	2
1	Rockhurst	1
2	UC San Diego	0
Wingate	2

Championship; December 3, 2016; Swope Soccer Village; Kansas City, Missouri
1	Charleston	0
1	Wingate	2

== Final ==
December 3, 2016
12:00 EST (UTC−5)

Wingate	2–0	Charleston (WV)
Garret Bridgewater (yellow card) 21:17'; Jon Ander 36:02' (Perez), 78:00'	Report 1 Report 2	Thomas Vancaeyezeele (yellow card) 36:57'; Williams N'dah (yellow card) 84:33'

Swope Soccer Village, Kansas City, Missouri
Referee: Sorin Stoica

== See also ==
- NCAA Men's Soccer Championships (Division I, Division III)
- NCAA Women's Soccer Championships (Division I, Division II, Division III)
