= Rich Weinrebe =

American soccer coach and former player

Personal information
- Place of birth: East Providence, Rhode Island, U.S.

College career
Years	Team	Apps	(Gls)
2004–2008	New Hampshire		

Managerial career
- 2012–2013: Southern New Hampshire (assistant)
- 2014–2021: New Hampshire (assistant/associate H.C)
- 2022–2023: Northeastern
- 2024–: New Hampshire

Rich Weinrebe is an American soccer coach and former player who is currently the head coach of the New Hampshire Wildcats men's soccer team.

== Playing career ==
Weinrebe played four years at the University of New Hampshire where he was a team captain for two seasons. He graduated in 2008 with a degree in sports studies.

== Coaching career ==
From 2012 to 2013, Weinrebe was an assistant coach at Southern New Hampshire University, an NCAA Division II soccer program. In 2013, he helped Southern New Hampshire to win the DII national championship with a 21–1–1 record.

From 2014 to 2021, Weinrebe coached on the staff of the University of New Hampshire for eight seasons. During five of those seasons he was a recruiting coordinator and associate head coach.

From 2022 to 2023, Weinrebe was head coach at Northeastern University, coaching for two seasons.

On January 4, 2024, Weinrebe was named as the 12th men's soccer head coach at the University of New Hampshire. He replaced Marc Hubbard who had held the position from 2015 until 2023.
