= 2012 Big Ten Conference men's soccer season =

Big Ten Conference
- Season: 2012
- Champions: Michigan State
- Premiers: Penn State
- NCAA Tournament: Indiana; Michigan; Michigan State; Northwestern

2012 Big Ten Conference men's soccer standings
	Conf.					Overall
Team	W		L		T	W		L		T
Penn State	3	–	1	–	2	9	–	5	–	3
No. 18 Northwestern	3	–	1	–	2	13	–	6	–	4
Michigan	3	–	2	–	1	11	–	10	–	1
No. 1 Indiana	3	–	2	–	1	16	–	5	–	3
Michigan State†	3	–	3	–	0	11	–	10	–	1
Wisconsin	1	–	3	–	2	6	–	8	–	5
Ohio State	0	–	4	–	2	6	–	10	–	3
As of December 11, 2012; Rankings from NSCAA

The 2012 Big Ten Conference men's soccer season was the 22nd season of men's varsity soccer in the conference. Penn State and Northwestern tied for first in the regular season, while Michigan State won the Big Ten Tournament. Indiana won the NCAA Tournament, winning their eighth title.

== Preseason ==
Northwestern and eventual national champions Indiana were picked to tie as the conference regular season champions.

=== Preseason poll ===
Projected Rank	School	2011 Finish
T-1	Northwestern	1st
T-1	Indiana	4th
3	Michigan State	5th
4	Ohio State	T-2nd
5	Penn State	7th
6	Wisconsin	T-2nd
7	Michigan	6th

== Teams ==
=== Stadia and locations ===
Team	Location	Stadium	Capacity
Indiana Hoosiers	Bloomington, Indiana	Armstrong Stadium	6,000
Michigan Wolverines	Ann Arbor, Michigan	U-M Soccer Stadium	2,200
Michigan State Spartans	East Lansing, Michigan	DeMartin Soccer Complex	2,500
Northwestern Wildcats	Evanston, Illinois	Lakeside Field	2,000
Ohio State Buckeyes	Columbus, Ohio	Owens Memorial Stadium	10,000
Penn State Nittany Lions	State College, Pennsylvania	Jeffrey Field	5,000
Wisconsin Badgers	Madison, Wisconsin	McClimon Stadium	2,000

- Illinois, Iowa, Minnesota, Nebraska and Purdue do not sponsor men's soccer

=== Personnel ===
Team	Head coach	Shirt supplier
Indiana	(United States) Todd Yeagley	(Germany) Adidas
Michigan	(Canada) Chaka Daley	(Germany) Adidas
Michigan State	(United States) Damon Rensing	(United States) Nike
Northwestern	(United States) Tim Lenahan	(United States) Under Armour
Ohio State	(United States) John Bluem	(United States) Nike
Penn State	(United States) Bob Warming	(United States) Nike
Wisconsin	(United States) John Trask	(Germany) Adidas

== Regular season ==
=== Results ===
Home \ Away	IND	MIC	MSU	NOR	OSU	PSU	WIS
Indiana	—	1–2	—	1–1	—	—	2–0
Michigan	—	—	1–0	—	3–2	1–1	—
Michigan State	3–1	—	—	1–2	—	—	2–0
Northwestern	—	2–0	—	—	1–0	0–1	—
Ohio State	0–2	—	1–2	—	—	—	0–0
Penn State	0–1	—	2–1	—	4–4	—	—
Wisconsin	—	2–1	—	0–0	—	0–1	—

Source: Team Statistics
Legend: Blue = home team win; Yellow = draw; Red = away team win.

== Postseason ==
=== Big Ten Tournament ===
Semifinal
1	Penn State	1
5	Michigan State	3
2	Northwestern	0
3	Michigan	3

Final
5	Michigan State (OT)	2
3	Michigan	1

=== NCAA Tournament ===
Seed	Region	School	1st Round	2nd Round	3rd Round	Quarterfinals	Semifinals	Final
16	1	Indiana	BYE	W 4–1 vs. Xavier – (Bloomington)	W, 2–1 vs. Notre Dame – (Notre Dame)	W, 1–0 vs. North Carolina – (Chapel Hill)	W, 1–0 vs. Creighton – (Hoover)	W, 1–0 vs. Georgetown – (Hoover)
—	1	Michigan State	W, 2–1 vs. Cleveland State – (East Lansing)	L, 0–3 vs. Notre Dame – (Notre Dame)				
—	2	Michigan	W, 3–1 vs. Niagara – (Ann Arbor)	L, 1–2 vs. Akron – (Akron)				
—	4	Northwestern	W 1–0 vs. Western Illinois – (Evanston)	W, 1–0 vs. Marquette – (Milwaukee)	L, 1–2 vs. Louisville – (Louisville)			

== See also ==
- Big Ten Conference
- 2012 Big Ten Conference Men's Soccer Tournament
- 2012 NCAA Division I men's soccer season
- 2012 in American soccer
