= Ohio Valley University =

Private Christian College in Vienna, West Virginia, U.S.

- Former name: Ohio Valley College
- Motto: Philologia, Fides, Vita
- Motto in English: Philology, Faith, Life
- Type: Private college
- Active: 1960; 66 years ago – 2022; 4 years ago
- Affiliations: NAIA, River States Conference (RSC)
- Religious affiliation: Church of Christ
- Chancellor: Keith Stotts
- President: Michael Ross
- Vice-president: Wes Crum
- Location: Vienna, West Virginia, U.S. 39°18′16″N 81°32′3″W
- Campus: Urban, 267 acres (108 ha)
- Colors: Navy, grey and red
- Nickname: Fighting Scots
- Sporting affiliations: NAIA - RSC
- Website: www.ovu.edu

Ohio Valley University was a private Christian college located between Parkersburg and Vienna in West Virginia, United States. Founded in 1958 (with classes beginning in fall 1960), the school integrated education with teachings of the Christian faith. The college was physically located on two separate campuses totalling 267 acres (108 ha). At one time, OVU offered bachelor's degrees in more than 30 different subject areas, but scaled back its academic options as enrollment numbers and financial stability dropped significantly. The college was accredited by the Higher Learning Commission, and was placed under academic probation in 2020 by the Higher Learning Commission due to ongoing long-term financial struggles.

In December 2021, the OVU Board of Directors voted to close the college after the fall 2021 semester. The West Virginia Higher Education Policy Commission voted to revoke OVU's authority to grant degrees shortly thereafter. Seniors were allowed to finish their degrees without the loss of any credit hours in the spring semester of 2022 at several other institutions of higher education related to Churches of Christ through "teach out" agreements.

== History ==
In 1956, several alumni of Harding University formed a committee to establish a Church of Christ-affiliated college in the West Virginia area. A foundation was formed to solicit funds for the future college.

On September 14, 1960, Ohio Valley College opened with classes being offered at South Parkersburg Church of Christ (now the Camden Avenue Church of Christ). In 1963, the campus opened with an administrative and classroom building on 133 acres (538,000 m^{2}) between Parkersburg and Vienna which had been purchased in 1958. Two dormitories were opened that same year. An additional dormitory and library were built in 1966. Three years later an auditorium and student center opened. A cafeteria and student center opened in the 1979–80 school year. An athletic complex was built in 1992.

Ohio Valley College merged with Philadelphia-area Northeastern Christian Junior College in 1993 and the following year doubled its campus size with the purchase of 134 acres (542,000 m^{2}) and the four-story St. Joseph's Seminary from the Roman Catholic Diocese of Wheeling-Charleston. The newly acquired property became North Campus. The former seminary contained a chapel, gymnasium, classrooms, cafeteria, conference and resource rooms, dormitory housing for over 200 residents, and a dilapidated indoor pool. The grounds of North Campus were heavily wooded, with open spaces repurposed for a soccer field, softball field, and outdoor recreation. The Stotts Administration Center (North Campus) became the site for most academic functions and daily chapel. It also included the computer lab and business offices. North Campus housed the men's dormitories on parts of the 3rd and 4th floors, while the women's dorm remained on the original campus (now South Campus) a short distance from Fox Dining Hall. The library, science labs, performing arts auditorium, and several classrooms also remained on South Campus. Married students were later assigned to the original Church, Clark, and Lowland dorms on South Campus. The school renovated the Stotts Administration Center and constructed two new dormitories (Smith and Rampy) on North Campus with a connecting lobby in 2003, consolidating much of the resident student population into one location. Prior to the opening of the new dorms, a shuttle van provided transportation between both campuses. By the late 2010s, South Campus functions had been primarily reserved for athletics administration, while most academic activities took place on North Campus. The women's dorm on South Campus was sold, and Fox Dining Hall was turned into a wrestling facility and student activity center.

In 2005, the college changed its name to Ohio Valley University, and introduced its first graduate degree program in education.

=== Closure ===
In July 2020, the university's accreditor, the Higher Learning Commission, placed the university on probation for failing to comply with the accreditor's criterion requiring a "resource base [that] supports its current educational programs and its plans for maintaining and strengthening their quality in the future". In December 2021, the OVU Board of Directors voted to close due to financial difficulties; the state's higher education body voted shortly thereafter to revoke OVU's authority to grant degrees.

The final graduation ceremony took place May 14, 2022, at Grand Central Church of Christ in Vienna, West Virginia.

In spring 2022, the buildings and land contained on both campuses, as well as off-site properties, were accepted into receivership in response to Chapter 7 bankruptcy filings. Sources for the school stated that all student records had become the property of the receivership trustee. In addition, electrical and telephone issues persisted on campus for many months, contributing to the continuation of excessive delays in transcript requests and enrollment verifications for former students. In early July 2022, all real estate assets were listed for sale, and the following summer it was announced that the former campus would be acquired by West Virginia University at Parkersburg.

In August 2022, it was reported to WTAP News that OVU had lost all academic records since 1960 and had no records of anyone's attendance at the school. This news was followed several days later by a representative of the school announcing via social media that academic records of former students had been either erased or removed from the remaining technology available on campus. The representative suggested that the missing records were attributed to someone with administrative privileges to the Power Campus server changing the password, then deleting all student records from the database. In response, several hundred alumni gathered on Facebook to coordinate future legal action against the school. Ultimately, the data loss issue proved to be false. Following favorable legal proceedings in late 2022, transcripts became available and were sporadically and inconsistently distributed to former students through the law office of Martin Sheehan in Wheeling, West Virginia. On September 9, 2023, an announcement was made stating that transcript records would be stored and maintained through the registrar at Oklahoma Christian University.

== Campus ==
Large parts of the campus were in the Vienna municipal limits, though other sections were in unincorporated areas.

== Student life ==
All full-time students were required to attend daily chapel services and first-year dormitory residents followed a curfew system. Given the Christian structure of the college, many policies were in place to manage student actions and behaviors, including restrictions on alcohol consumption, sexual relations outside of marriage, and tobacco/drug use.

Ohio Valley University did not have national fraternities and sororities. Instead, the school sponsored four co-ed social clubs: Theta, Delta, Kappa, and Sigma. Clubs competed in intramural activities, service projects, and Expressions, a musical concert and drama competition held annually in the spring.

A full-service cafeteria was located in the Stotts Administration Center on North Campus, replacing the services provided in Fox Dining Hall on South Campus.

The university offered opportunities in several performing groups. These groups included the OVU Singers, which was composed of approximately 32 singers. This group performed at congregations, youth rallies, and other venues. The Ambassadors was a dramatic group which traveled around to youth rallies, camps, and other church-related events. The OVU Jazz Ensemble was an integrated group of students and community members composed of woodwind, brass, and string ensembles and groups of a variety of instrumentation. The Ensemble performed at two on campus concerts a year and frequently gave performances for the community. Express was the college's contemporary Christian a cappella performing group. This group performed at over 200 events per year.

== Academics ==
OVU stressed a Christian world view in its educational programming, and all students were required to complete an instructional Bible component each semester. At its peak, the institution had 35 different degree tracks and 33 minor concentrations within the Colleges of Business, Biblical Education, Education, and Arts and Sciences. OVU held an annual lectureship series on campus, attracting leaders within the Church of Christ denomination to discuss biblical topics.

OVU had placed significant effort into becoming a 21st-century center of academic innovation and excellence, and to that end had a number of unique programs in place, with more planned. Among the highlights were the Integrated Marketing and Communications degree program, which came online in 2018.

Energy was briefly a major focus at OVU, in part as an outgrowth of the growing oil and gas industry in West Virginia and southeastern Ohio. OVU was also affiliated with the ACE Educational Foundation, which led efforts to construct a 90-100 megawatt clean coal gasification plant in Vienna, West Virginia by 2020. In addition to becoming a major revenue generator for the local community, the plant was expected to serve as a location where undergraduates could learn strong business practices and learn how a functioning power plant operates. Part of the effort included making practical use of excess carbon dioxide in an on-site aquaculture greenhouse through a partnership with ECSIA.

In June 2020, the Higher Learning Commission placed the university on probation for failure to comply with the accreditation standard related to adequate finances. The commission reevaluated if the institution could demonstrate if it was in compliance with the criteria for accreditation.

== Athletics ==
Ohio Valley University (OVU) athletic teams were called the Fighting Scots. The university was a member of the National Association of Intercollegiate Athletics (NAIA), competing in the River States Conference (RSC), with competition beginning in the fall of 2021. Prior to returning to the NAIA, the Fighting Scots were classified as Division II in the National Collegiate Athletic Association (NCAA) from 1999 to 2021, and had the lowest enrollment of any Division II school in the nation.

OVU's transition to NCAA Division II began when the school initially left the NAIA in the late 1990s, joining the now-defunct West Virginia Intercollegiate Athletic Conference (WVIAC) in 1999. It remained a member of the WVIAC until 2013, when the conference announced its dissolution. OVU moved to the Great Midwest Athletic Conference (G-MAC) from 2013 to spring 2021 and entered the conference alongside former WVIAC members Alderson-Broaddus, Davis & Elkins and Salem International.

OVU competed in 14 intercollegiate varsity sports. Men's sports included baseball, basketball, cross country, golf, soccer, track & field and wrestling; women's sports included basketball, cross country, golf, soccer, softball, track & field and volleyball.

The basketball and volleyball teams held home games in the Snyder Activity Center on South Campus. The baseball team played home games at Bennett Stump Field at Parkersburg City Park. Soccer and softball games took place on North Campus.

Fighting Scots teams captured nine conference championships (men's golf 2003, 2009 WVIAC; baseball 2006 WVIAC; women's golf 2010 WVIAC; men's soccer 2017, 2020–21 G-MAC; and women's soccer 2017, 2018 G-MAC, 2021 RSC).

=== Men's soccer ===
The OVU men's soccer program reached the NCAA Division II tournament in 2017 (Sweet 16, final ranking No. 8), 2018 (Elite 8, final ranking No. 10), and 2019 (Sweet 16, final ranking No. 18). The 2017 team entered the NCAA tournament as the No. 1 seed in the Midwest Regional. The team spent two weeks early in the 2018 season ranked No. 2 in national polls. The 2019 season included a 1–0 victory over eventual 2019 NCAA Division II national champion University of Charleston.

In response to COVID-19, the fall 2020 season was moved to the spring of 2021 for all NCAA schools. The 2020–21 season began with a 1–1 draw with eventual 2020 NCAA Division I national champion Marshall University on February 13, 2021, in Huntington, West Virginia. Marshall was ranked No. 9 in Division I, and the Fighting Scots were less than four minutes away from a huge upset before the Thundering Herd tied the match late on a corner kick. Neither team scored in the two overtime sessions. The team completed the G-MAC regular season and tournament with an 11-0-0 record. Due to the ongoing COVID-19 pandemic, the NCAA opted not to hold a Division II national tournament for the 2020-2021 sports year. While no national champion was crowned, the Fighting Scots finished the season ranked No. 3 in the final edition of the Division II United Soccer Coaches poll.

=== Women's soccer ===
The OVU women's soccer team earned a trip to the NAIA national tournament in the fall of 2021 after finishing the season undefeated (13–0) and winning the RSC tournament. The program also played in two NCAA Division II tournaments (2017 and 2018), reaching the 2nd round in 2018. Both appearances followed wins in G-MAC tournament finals.

In 2002, goalkeeper Lisa Dingley set NCAA all-division records for saves per game (25.88) and total saves for the season (414). She also holds the NCAA Division II record for career saves per game (20.19, 626 saves in 31 career games). OVU women's soccer can be found in the NCAA Division II record book again in 2004 for allowing the most goals (31) and the most points (74) in a single game versus Wheeling Jesuit. In 2017, the team coached by Luis Rincon tied an NCAA Division II mark by having the largest win-loss turnaround in consecutive years (2016: 1–15–1, 2017: 16–1–3). These records still stand.

=== Baseball ===
OVU Baseball participated in the 2006 NCAA Division II tournament after winning the WVIAC tournament. They lost in the first round to Kutztown University, but rebounded with a win over Pitt-Johnstown in the loser's bracket. They were defeated by Kutztown again, ending their run in the double-elimination field.

Former MLB pitcher Dustin Nippert was a member of the OVU baseball team before transferring to West Virginia University.
