= Marc Hubbard =

American soccer coach and former player

Personal information
- Date of birth: June 13, 1981 (age 45)
- Place of birth: Durham, New Hampshire
- Height: 6 ft 3 in (1.91 m)
- Position: Defender

College career
Years	Team	Apps	(Gls)
1999–2003	Colgate Raiders		

Senior career*
Years	Team	Apps	(Gls)
2003	Syracuse Salty Dogs		
2004	Wilmington Hammerheads FC	11	(0)
2005–2007	New Hampshire Phantoms	38	(2)

Managerial career
- 2003–2007: New Hampshire (assistant)
- 2008–2014: Southern New Hampshire
- 2015–2023: New Hampshire
- 2024–: NC State
- * Club domestic league appearances and goals

Marc Hubbard (June 13, 1981) is an American soccer head coach and former player who played professionally in the USL Second Division and is currently the head coach of the NC State men's soccer team.

== Playing career ==
Hubbard attended Colgate University and was a four-year letter winner as a defender. He was a captain of the team in 2002 when he was also named to the All-Atlantic Region Second Team. He was named to the All-Patriot League team for three straight years (2000-2002).

After graduating from Colgate, Hubbard went on to play for five years in the then professional USL Second Division. He began his professional career with the Syracuse Salty Dogs, where he played in 2003. In 2004 he moved to the Wilmington Hammerheads. Hubbard started eleven games and helped the Hammerheads to a 10–6–3 record. From Wilmington, he moved to the New Hampshire Phantoms from 2005–2007. During his three years with the club, he scored two goals and made thirty eight appearances.

== Coaching career ==
Hubbard began his coaching career at New Hampshire as an assistant coach from 2003-2007. His first head coaching job was at Southern New Hampshire, where he stayed from 2008-2014. In his seven seasons at the helm, Hubbard amassed a 117–20–16 record. The Penmen qualified for the NCAA Division II tournament all seven years Hubbard was head coach, and won the tournament title in 2013. Hubbard also led the team to four Northeast-10 Conference tournament titles and four regular-season titles during his tenure. Hubbard won NSCAA Division II Coach of the Year in 2013, and Northeast-10 Coach of the Year on three occasions.

Hubbard moved back to New Hampshire prior to the 2015 season. During his tenure as head coach at New Hampshire, Hubbard posted a 115–32–21 record. The Wildcats qualified for the NCAA Division I tournament in seven consecutive seasons, from 2017 to 2023. Their best results were in the Third Round in 2017, 2021, and 2023. The Wildcats won five America East Conference regular season titles and four America East tournament titles under Hubbard's leadership. Hubbard and his coaching staff were named America East coaching staff of the year in 2017, 2019, 2020, 2021, 2022, and 2023. Hubbard and staff were also named All-ECAC four times, in 2019, 2021, 2022, and 2023. Hubbard also coached twelve All-Americans and six MLS SuperDraft picks while at New Hampshire.

Hubbard accepted the head coaching job at NC State before the 2024 season. Hubbard lead the Wolfpack to their first NCAA tournament berth since 2019 and first Round of 16 appearance since 1994.

== Head coaching record ==
Record table
Season	Team	Overall	Conference	Standing	Postseason
Southern New Hampshire (Northeast-10 Conference) (2008–2014)
2008	Southern New Hampshire	15–3–4	9–1–3	1st	NCAA Regional
2009	Southern New Hampshire	14–4–4	10–1–2	1st	NCAA Quarterfinal
2010	Southern New Hampshire	12–3–5	7–3–3	5th	NCAA Second Round
2011	Southern New Hampshire	18–4–0	11–2–0	2nd	NCAA Quarterfinal
2012	Southern New Hampshire	19–4–0	10–3–0	2nd	NCAA Quarterfinal
2013	Southern New Hampshire	22–1–1	13–0–0	1st	NCAA Champions
2014	Southern New Hampshire	17–1–2	11–1–1	1st	NCAA Second Round
Southern New Hampshire:		117–20–16	71–11–9		
New Hampshire (America East Conference) (2015–2023)
2015	New Hampshire	10–5–3	3–3–1	6th	
2016	New Hampshire	12–7–0	4–3–0	5th	
2017	New Hampshire	13–4–5	4–2–1	4th	NCAA Third Round
2018	New Hampshire	12–4–2	4–2–1	2nd	NCAA First Round
2019	New Hampshire	15–2–3	5–1–1	T-1st	NCAA Second Round
2020	New Hampshire	8–1–1	5–0–1	1st	NCAA second round
2021	New Hampshire	17–2–2	7–0–1	1st	NCAA Third Round
2022	New Hampshire	15–0–5	6–0–1	1st	NCAA Second Round
2023	New Hampshire	13–3–4	4–0–3	1st	NCAA Third Round
New Hampshire:		115–28–25	42–11–10		
NC State (Atlantic Coast Conference) (2024–present)
2024	NC State	10–5–5	3–3–2	T-8th	NCAA Third Round
NC State:		10–5–5	3–3–2		
Total:		242–53–46			
National champion Postseason invitational champion Conference regular season champion Conference regular season and conference tournament champion Division regular season champion Division regular season and conference tournament champion Conference tournament champion
