= 2012 Indiana Hoosiers men's soccer team =

American college soccer season

2012 Indiana Hoosiers men's soccer

National Champions

NCAA Tournament, College Cup vs. Georgetown, W 1–0
- Conference: Big Ten Conference

Ranking
- Coaches: No. 1
- Record: 17–5–4 (3–2–1 Big Ten)
- Head coach: Todd Yeagley (3rd season)
- Home stadium: Bill Armstrong Stadium

Uniform
Home	Away

2012 Big Ten Conference men's soccer standings
	Conf.					Overall
Team	W		L		T	W		L		T
Penn State	3	–	1	–	2	9	–	5	–	3
No. 18 Northwestern	3	–	1	–	2	13	–	6	–	4
Michigan	3	–	2	–	1	11	–	10	–	1
No. 1 Indiana	3	–	2	–	1	16	–	5	–	3
Michigan State†	3	–	3	–	0	11	–	10	–	1
Wisconsin	1	–	3	–	2	6	–	8	–	5
Ohio State	0	–	4	–	2	6	–	10	–	3
As of December 11, 2012; Rankings from NSCAA

The 2012 Indiana Hoosiers men's soccer team was the college's 40th season playing organized men's college soccer.

== Background ==
In the 2011 season Indiana finished fourth in the conference, and lost in the Big Ten Tournament semifinal to eventual champion Northwestern on penalties. Indiana also entered the NCAA Tournament and lost in the third round to North Carolina.

== Roster ==
Note: Flags indicate national team as defined under FIFA eligibility rules; some limited exceptions apply. Players may hold more than one non-FIFA nationality.

No.	Pos.	Nation	Player
0	GK	USA	Nate Mitchell
1	GK	USA	Luis Soffner
2	FW	USA	Eriq Zavaleta
3	MF	USA	Lance Davis
4	DF	USA	Derek Creviston
5	DF	USA	Matt McKain
6	FW	BEN	Femi Hollinger-Janzen
7	MF	USA	Harrison Petts
8	MF	USA	Nikita Kotlov
9	FW	USA	Andrew Oliver
10	MF	USA	A. J. Corrado
11	MF	GRE	Aris Zafeiratos
12	MF	USA	Joe Tolen
13	FW	USA	Tim Wylie

No.	Pos.	Nation	Player
14	FW	USA	T.J. Popolizio
15	MF	USA	Jamie Vollmer
17	MF	USA	Jacob Bushue
18	MF	USA	Richard Ballard
19	DF	USA	Patrick Doody
21	FW	USA	Kyle Sparks
22	DF	USA	Caleb Konstanski
23	DF	USA	Kerel Bradford
24	DF	USA	Drew Schall
25	DF	USA	Zach Martin
26	DF	USA	Adam Goldfaden
30	MF	USA	Dylan Lax
32	GK	USA	Michael Soderlund
33	GK	USA	Sean Weidman

== Competitions ==
=== Preseason ===
August 14	Indiana	1–1	UIC	Bloomington, Indiana
7:30 pm ET		Report		Stadium: Armstrong Stadium; Attendance: 681; Referee: Ben Trevino

August 18	Indiana	1–1 (a.e.t.) (4–3 p)	C.D. Guadalajara	Fort Wayne, Indiana
7:00 pm ET		Report

=== Regular season ===
==== Match results ====
Home team is listed on the right, away team is listed on the left.

August 24 1	Indiana	2–1	Saint Louis	St. Louis, Missouri
8:00 pm EDT		Report
Note: 2012 Billiken Classic

August 26 2	Indiana	3–0	Cincinnati	St. Louis, Missouri
1:00 pm EDT		Report
Note: 2012 Billiken Classic

August 31 3	Clemson	0–3	Indiana	Bloomington, Indiana
8:00 pm EDT		Report
Note: adidas/IU Credit Union Classic

September 2 4	San Diego State	0–0 (a.e.t.)	Indiana	Bloomington, Indiana
8:00 pm EDT		Report
Note: adidas/IU Credit Union Classic

September 7 5	Akron	1–0	Indiana	South Bend, Indiana
5:00 pm EDT		Report
Note: Mike Berticelli Memorial Tournament

September 9 6	Indiana	3–2	Oregon State	South Bend, Indiana
11:30 am EDT		Report
Note: Mike Berticelli Memorial Tournament

September 14 7	#22 SIU Edwardsville	0–2	#16 Indiana	Bloomington, Indiana
7:30 pm EDT		Report

September 23 8	Indiana	2–0	Ohio State	Columbus, Ohio
1:00 pm EDT		Report

September 26 9	Notre Dame	1–0	Indiana	Bloomington, Indiana
7:00 pm EDT		Report

September 29 10	Indiana	1–0 (a.e.t.)	Penn State	State College, Pennsylvania
7:00 pm EDT		Report

October 3 11	Indiana	4–1	Kentucky	Lexington, Kentucky
7:00 pm EDT		Report

October 6 12	Wisconsin	0–2	Indiana	Bloomington, Indiana
7:00 pm EDT		Report

October 10 13	Indiana	2–2 (a.e.t.)	Louisville	Louisville, Kentucky
7:00 pm EDT		Report

October 16 14	Butler	0–2	Indiana	Bloomington, Indiana
7:30 pm EDT		Report

October 19 15	Michigan	2–1	Indiana	Bloomington, Indiana
7:30 pm EDT		Report

October 24 16	Evansville	0–2	Indiana	Bloomington, Indiana
7:30 pm EDT		Report

October 28 17	Indiana	1–3	Michigan State	East Lansing, Michigan
1:00 pm EDT		Report

October 24 18	Northwestern	1–1 (a.e.t.)	Indiana	Bloomington, Indiana
8:00 pm EDT		Report

=== Big Ten Tournament ===
November 7 QF	(#5) Michigan State	2–1	#23 (#4) Indiana	Evanston, Illinois
1:00 pm CST	Montague 4'; Wilson (yellow card) 75'; Keener 77'	Report	Kotlov 84'	Stadium: Lakeside Field; Attendance: 384; Referee: Abbey Okulajae

=== NCAA Tournament ===
November 18 Second round	#18 Xavier	1–4	#22 (#16) Indiana	Bloomington, Indiana
1:00 PM EST	M. Walker 33'	Report	Kotlov 18', 68', 83'; Hollinger-Janzen 80'	Stadium: Armstrong Stadium; Attendance: 1,161; Referee: Hilario Grajeda

November 25 Third round	#22 (#16) Indiana	2–1 (a.e.t.)	#3 (#1) Notre Dame	Notre Dame, Indiana
3:00 PM EST	Kotlov 55'; Zavaleta 102'	Report	Richard 54'	Stadium: Alumni Stadium; Attendance: 1,242; Referee: Brent Sorg

November 30 QF	#22 (#16) Indiana	1–0	#5 (#9) North Carolina	Chapel Hill, North Carolina
6:00 EST	Zavaleta 60'	Report		Stadium: Fetzer Field; Attendance: 4,352; Referee: Edvin Jurisevic

December 7 SF	#22 (#16) Indiana	1–0	#8 (#12) Creighton	Hoover, Alabama
7:30 PM EST	Hollinger-Janzen 27'	Report		Stadium: Regions Park; Attendance: 11,074; Referee: Edvin Juresvic

December 9 F	#22 (#16) Indiana	1–0	#6 (#3) Georgetown	Hoover, Alabama
2:00 PM EST	Kotlov 64'	Report		Stadium: Regions Park; Attendance: 9,242; Referee: Hilario Grajeda

== See also ==
- 2012 Big Ten Conference men's soccer season
- 2012 Big Ten Conference Men's Soccer Tournament
