= Damon Rensing =

American soccer coach

Current position
- Title: Head coach
- Team: Michigan State Spartans
- Conference: Big Ten Conference

Biographical details
- Born: November 12, 1974 (age 51); St Louis, Missouri
- Education: Michigan State University

Coaching career (HC unless noted)
- 1997–1998: Michigan State (W) (AC)
- 1998–1999: UNLV (W)
- 1999–2008: Michigan State (M) (AC)
- 2008–: Michigan State (M)

Damon Rensing is an American soccer coach who currently coaches the Michigan State Spartans men's soccer program.

== Head coaching record ==
Record table
Season	Team	Overall	Conference	Standing	Postseason
UNLV (Women) () (1998–1999)
1998	UNLV	8–10–1			
Michigan State (Men) (Big Ten Conference) (2009–present)
2009	Michigan State	11–8–2	2–4–0	6th	B1G semifinals
2010	Michigan State	13–7–2	2–4–0	6th	B1G quarterfinals NCAA second round
2011	Michigan State	7–8–4	2–2–2	5th	B1G quarterfinals
2012	Michigan State	11–10–1	3–3–0	5th	B1G Champions; NCAA second round
2013	Michigan State	14–6–3	3–2–1	3rd	B1G finals NCAA quarterfinals
2014	Michigan State	12–5–6	4–2–2	5th	B1G semifinals NCAA quarterfinals
2015	Michigan State	8–9–2	2–4–2	8th	B1G play-in
2016	Michigan State	13–5–2	4–3–1	4th	B1G semifinals NCAA first round
2017	Michigan State	13–3–4	5–0–3	3rd	B1G quarterfinals NCAA quarterfinals
2018	Michigan State	14–5–4	4–2–2	4th	B1G quarterfinals NCAA College Cup
2019	Michigan State	3–12–3	3–4–1	6th	B1G quarterfinals
2020	Michigan State	4–7	4–6	6th	B1G quarterfinals
2021	Michigan State	6–8–2	2–4–2	8th	B1G quarterfinals
2022	Michigan State	6–9–2	3–4–1	6th	B1G quarterfinals
2023	Michigan State	7–2–7	3–1–4	3rd	B1G quarterfinals
2024	Michigan State	5–7–5	4–4–2	5th	B1G quarterfinals
Michigan State:		148–112–49 (.558)	50–49–23 (.504)		
Total:		156–132–50 (.536)			
National champion Postseason invitational champion Conference regular season champion Conference regular season and conference tournament champion Division regular season champion Division regular season and conference tournament champion Conference tournament champion
