= New Hampshire Wildcats men's soccer =

American college soccer team

- Founded: 1924; 102 years ago
- University: University of New Hampshire
- Head coach: Rich Weinrebe
- Conference: America East
- Location: Durham, New Hampshire, US
- Stadium: Wildcat Stadium (capacity: 11,015)
- Nickname: Wildcats
- Colors: Blue, gray, and white
Home	Away

NCAA tournament Round of 16
- 2017, 2021, 2023

NCAA tournament Round of 32
- 1994, 2017, 2019, 2020, 2021, 2022, 2023

NCAA tournament appearances
- 1994, 2017, 2018, 2019, 2020, 2021, 2022, 2023

Conference tournament championships
- 2018, 2019, 2020, 2022

Conference regular season championships
- 2009, 2019, 2020, 2021, 2022, 2023

The New Hampshire Wildcats men's soccer team represents the University of New Hampshire in all NCAA Division I men's college soccer competitions. The Wildcats play in the America East Conference. They play in Wildcat Stadium in Durham, New Hampshire.

New Hampshire has six America East regular-season titles (2009, 2019, 2020, 2021, 2022, and 2023), and eight NCAA tournament appearances (1994, 2017, 2018, 2019, 2020, 2021, 2022, and 2023).

The Wildcats saw a surge to the top under the guidance of head coach Marc Hubbard which has gained them both regional and national recognition. He helped UNH secure four regular-season conference titles, 4 conference tournament titles, and six NCAA tournaments during his eight-year tenure. Following the 2023 season, Hubbard announced he would be leaving the program. On January 4, 2024, it was announced that Rich Weinrebe would become UNH's 12th men's soccer head coach.

In recent years, the Wildcats have developed a rivalry with fellow America East member Vermont. The all-time record between the teams lies at 38–20–20 in favor of Vermont, and both teams regularly compete for the America East title.

== Roster ==
As of September 29, 2024

Note: Flags indicate national team as defined under FIFA eligibility rules; some limited exceptions apply. Players may hold more than one non-FIFA nationality.

No.	Pos.	Nation	Player
0	GK	USA	Scott Williams
1	GK	USA	Erik Lauta
2	DF	GER	Max Voigt
3	DF	USA	Arian Recinos
4	DF	KOR	Jaehyuk Moon
5	DF	FRA	Baptiste Gateau
7	FW	USA	Michael Tsicoulias
8	MF	FRA	Mattéo Brossel
9	FW	CAN	Ibrahim Conde
10	FW	USA	Federico Tellez
11	MF	FRA	Terry Makedika

No.	Pos.	Nation	Player
12	MF	BRA	João Catafesta
14	DF	USA	Jacob Stazenski
15	MF	USA	Eduard Fandunyan
16	MF	USA	Brady Lewis
17	MF	USA	Austin Bush
18	MF	KOR	Jiwoo Lee
19	FW	USA	Matthew Goncalves
20	MF	USA	Dylan Maxon
21	DF	ENG	Aaron Williams
22	MF	USA	Reed Cash
23	DF	USA	Adison Hicks

== Coaching staff ==
As of March 2024

Name	Position coached
Rich Weinrebe	Head coach
Stefan Defregger	Assistant coach
Ian de Oliveira	Assistant coach
Dave Williams	Goalkeeper coach
Panos Galatas	Director of operations

== Postseason ==
=== NCAA Tournament ===
New Hampshire has appeared in eight NCAA tournaments. They first appeared in the tournament in 1994. They did not return to the national stage until 2017, achieving automatic qualification following their America East Conference tournament win. Their deepest runs into the tournament were in 2017, 2021, and 2023 when they reached the third round before losing to Indiana, Oregon State, and Clemson, respectively.

=== America East Conference Tournament ===
New Hampshire secured their first-ever America East conference tournament title in 2018 as they routed No. 5 UMBC 5–0 in the championship. This win kicked off a string of three consecutive America East tournament championships in the 2019 and 2020 seasons. In 2019, the Wildcats came in as the No. 1 seed and got by No. 3 Hartford 1–0 to clinch the title. In the 2020 season (partially played in 2021 due to the COVID-19 pandemic), UNH again came into the tournament as the No. 1 seed and held off No. 2 seeded Vermont 2–0 to complete the 'three-peat'. After a loss to Vermont in 2021, the Wildcats captured their fourth America East championship in five years after defeating Albany 2–0 in the 2022 championship game.

Year	Round	Opponent	Result
1994	First round	Brown	L 2–3^{2OT}
2017	First round Second round Third round	Fairfield; Dartmouth; Indiana	W 3–0; T 0–0^{4–1 PK} L 1–2
2018	First round	Colgate	L 0–1
2019	First round Second round	Fairleigh Dickinson; Virginia Tech	W 1–0; L 1–4
2020–21	First round	Kentucky	L 0–2
2021	Second round Third round	North Carolina; Oregon State	W 4–1; L 0–1
2022	First round Second round	Seton Hall; Florida International	W 2–1; L 2–2^{10–9 PK}
2023	Second round Third round	Syracuse; Clemson	W 3–0; L1–0

== Year by year results ==
Season	Coach	Overall	Conference	Standing	Postseason
Mike Noonan (North Atlantic Conference) (1991–2014)
1991	Mike Noonan	10–6–4	4–3–0		
1992	Mike Noonan	9–7–3	5–2–0		
1993	Mike Noonan	14–5–0	5–2–0		
1994	Mike Noonan	15–5–2	6–0–1		NCAA first round
Rob Thompson (America East Conference) (1995–1994)
1995	Rob Thompson	10–9–1	5–4	6th	
1996	Rob Thompson	3–12–4	3–4–2	7th	
1997	Rob Thompson	9–7–2	3–4–2	T–4th	
1998	Rob Thompson	9–8–1	5–4	5th	
1999	Rob Thompson	6–11–1	2–6–1	9th	
2000	Rob Thompson	6–10	3–6	7th	
2001	Rob Thompson	7–8–3	5–4–2	6th	
2002	Rob Thompson	10–5–2	4–2–2	4th	
2003	Rob Thompson	8–9	3–6	9th	
2004	Rob Thompson	6–6–7	3–3–3	6th	
2005	Rob Thompson	9–5–3	2–4–2	7th	
2006	Rob Thompson	12–5–3	6–2–1	3rd	
2007	Rob Thompson	5–5–9	2–1–5	5th	
2008	Rob Thompson	7–7–4	2–4–2	6th	
2009	Rob Thompson	9–7–2	6–0–1	1st	
2010	Rob Thompson	9–5–6	2–3–2	5th	
2011	Rob Thompson	7–9–2	1–4–2	7th	
2012	Rob Thompson	7–7–6	2–3–2	6th	
2013	Rob Thompson	12–5–1	5–2	2nd	
2014	Rob Thompson	4–13–2	2–5	8th	
Rob Thompson:		155–153–59	66–71–29		
Marc Hubbard (America East) (2015–2023)
2015	Marc Hubbard	10–5–3	3–3–1	6th	
2016	Marc Hubbard	12–7	4–3	5th	
2017	Marc Hubbard	13–4–5	4–2–1	4th	NCAA third round
2018	Marc Hubbard	12–4–2	4–2–1	2nd	NCAA first round
2019	Marc Hubbard	15–2–3	5–1–1	T–1st	NCAA second round
2020–21	Marc Hubbard	8–1–1	5–0–1	1st	NCAA second round
2021	Marc Hubbard	17–2–2	7–0–1	1st	NCAA third round
2022	Marc Hubbard	15–0–5	6–0–1	1st	NCAA second round
2023	Marc Hubbard	13–3–4	4–0–3	1st	NCAA third round
Marc Hubbard:		115–28–25	42–11–10		
Rich Weinrebe (America East) (2024–present)
2024	Rich Weinrebe	7–3–7	4–1–2	T–1st	
2025	Rich Weinrebe	5–8–5	3–3–1	4th	
Rich Weinrebe:		12–11–12	7–4–3		
Total:					
National champion Postseason invitational champion Conference regular season champion Conference regular season and conference tournament champion Division regular season champion Division regular season and conference tournament champion Conference tournament champion
