= 2019 NCAA Division II men's soccer tournament =

2019 NCAA Division II Men's Soccer Championship
Tournament details
- Country: United States
- Dates: November 24-December 14, 2019
- Teams: 40

Final positions
- Champions: Charleston (WV) (2nd title, 4th final)
- Runners-up: Cal State LA (2nd final)

Tournament statistics
- Matches played: 39
- Goals scored: 110 (2.82 per match)
- All statistics correct as of 11/19/2019.

The 2019 NCAA Division II Men's Soccer Championship was the 48th annual single-elimination tournament to determine the national champion of NCAA Division II men's collegiate soccer in the United States. The semifinals and championship game were played at Highmark Stadium in Pittsburgh, Pennsylvania from December 12–14, 2019 while the preceding rounds were played at various sites across the country during November 2019.

== Qualification ==
All Division II men's soccer programs were eligible to qualify for the 38-team tournament field. No teams received automatic bids; at-large bids are based on the teams' regular season records and the Quality of Winning Percentage Index. Teams were placed into one of four unbalanced super-regional brackets, consisting of eight or ten teams, based on geographic location.

=== Qualified Teams ===
Team	Qualified As	Qualified On	Qualification Type	Previous Appearances in Tournament	Previous best performance	Tournament Seed
Assumption	Northeast-10 Champions	November 18, 2019	Automatic	None (Debut)	—	Super Region 1 Seed No. 10
Azusa Pacific	Pacific West Champions	November 18, 2019	Automatic	2 (2014, 2018)	Third Round (2018)	Super Region 4 Seed No. 1
Bellarmine	Great Lakes Valley Champions	November 18, 2019	Automatic	None (Debut)	—	Super Region 3 Seed No. 2
Cal Poly Pomona	CCAA Champions	November 18, 2019	Automatic	5 (1998, 2015, 2016, 2017, 2018)	Runners-up (2015)	Super Region 4 Seed No. 4
Charleston (WV)	Mountain East Champions	November 18, 2019	Automatic	9 (1999, 2009, 2010, 2012, 2014, 2015, 2016, 2017, 2018)	Champions (2017)	Super Region 1 Seed No. 3
Colorado School of Mines	RMAC Champions	November 18, 2019	Automatic	8 (2005, 2009, 2010, 2012, 2013, 2015, 2017, 2018)	Quarterfinals (2015)	Super Region 4 Seed No. 8
Francis Marion	Peach Belt Champions	November 18, 2019	Automatic	2 (2000, 2008)	Quarterfinals (2000)	Super Region 2 Seed No. 7
Lee	Gulf South Champions	November 18, 2019	Automatic	None (Debut)	—	Super Region 2 Seed No. 9
Limestone	Conference Carolinas Champions	November 18, 2019	Automatic	7 (2006, 2008, 2013, 2014, 2016, 2017, 2018)	Third Round (2014)	Super Region 2 Seed No. 10
Lynn	Sunshine State Champions	November 18, 2019	Automatic	17 (1996, 1997, 1998, 1999, 2001, 2003, 2005, 2006, 2007, 2008, 2009, 2011, 2012, 2014, 2016, 2017, 2018)	Champions (2003, 2012, 2014)	Super Region 2 Seed No. 1
Mercy	East Coast Champions	November 18, 2019	Automatic	3 (1979, 1989, 2018)	Quarterfinals (1979)	Super Region 1 Seed No. 6
Midwestern State	Lone Star Champions	November 18, 2019	Automatic	13 (2002, 2003, 2006, 2007, 2008, 2009, 2010, 2011, 2013, 2014, 2015, 2016, 2017)	Semifinals (2007, 2010)	Super Region 4 Seed No. 10
Millersville (PA)	PSAC Champions	November 18, 2019	Automatic	6 (2008, 2009, 2011, 2013, 2015, 2018)	Semifinals (2011)	Super Region 1 Seed No. 8
Post	CACC Champions	November 18, 2019	Automatic	3 (2012, 2013, 2018)	Second Round (2012)	Super Region 1 Seed No. 9
Tiffin	GMAC Champions	November 18, 2019	Automatic	4 (2013, 2014, 2016, 2018)	Second Round (2013, 2016, 2018)	Super Region 3 Seed No. 6
Western Washington	GNAC Champions	November 18, 2019	Automatic	1 (2016)	Second Round (2016)	Super Region 4 Seed No. 6
Wingate	South Atlantic Champions	November 18, 2019	Automatic	9 (1999, 2007, 2010, 2012, 2014, 2015, 2016, 2017)	Champions (2016)	Super Region 2 Seed No. 3
Wis.-Parkside	GLIAC Champions	November 18, 2019	Automatic	4 (1994, 2000, 2004, 2006)	Second Round (2004)	Super Region 3 Seed No. 10
Adelphi	Super Region No. 1 Rank 2	November 18, 2019	At-Large Bid	8 (1972, 1973, 1974, 1975, 2015, 2016, 2017, 2018)	Champions (1974)	Super Region 1 Seed No. 1
Gannon	Super Region No. 1 Rank 1	November 18, 2019	At-Large Bid	9 (1984, 1985, 1986, 1988, 1989, 1990, 1993, 2007, 2012)	Semifinals (1989, 1990, 1993)	Super Region 1 Seed No. 2
Franklin Pierce	Super Region No. 1 Rank 5	November 18, 2019	At-Large Bid	19 (1991, 1992, 1993, 1994, 1995, 1996, 1997, 1998, 2003, 2004, 2005, 2006, 2007, 2008, 2009, 2010, 2011, 2012, 2016)	Champions (2007)	Super Region 1 Seed No. 4
Wilmington (DE)	Super Region No. 1 Rank 3	November 18, 2019	At-Large Bid	4 (2009, 2013, 2015, 2018)	Second Round (2009, 2013, 2015, 2018)	Super Region 1 Seed No. 5
West Chester	Super Region No. 1 Rank 6	November 18, 2019	At-Large Bid	4 (2002, 2016, 2017, 2018)	Runners-up (2018)	Super Region 1 Seed No. 7
Palm Beach Atl.	Super Region No. 2 Rank 3	November 18, 2019	At-Large Bid	4 (2015, 2016, 2017, 2018)	Quarterfinals (2015)	Super Region 2 Seed No. 2
Florida Tech	Super Region No. 2 Rank 4	November 18, 2019	At-Large Bid	9 (1987, 1988, 1989, 1990, 1991, 1992, 1993, 1994, 2016)	Champions (1988, 1991)	Super Region 2 Seed No. 4
West Florida	Super Region No. 2 Rank 2	November 18, 2019	At-Large Bid	6 (1998, 2006, 2007, 2008, 2010, 2013)	Semifinals (2006)	Super Region 2 Seed No. 5
Young Harris	Super Region No. 2 Rank 5	November 18, 2019	At-Large Bid	4 (2014, 2015, 2017, 2018)	Quarterfinals (2014, 2017)	Super Region 2 Seed No. 6
Queens (NC)	Super Region No. 2 Rank 8	November 18, 2019	At-Large Bid	7 (1999, 2002, 2004, 2006, 2007, 2013, 2018)	Quarterfinals (1999, 2006)	Super Region 2 Seed No. 8
Lake Erie	Super Region No. 3 Rank 1	November 18, 2019	At-Large Bid	None (Debut)	—	Super Region 3 Seed No. 1
Maryville (MO)	Super Region No. 3 Rank 4	November 18, 2019	At-Large Bid	2 (2017, 2018)	Second Round (2017)	Super Region 3 Seed No. 3
McKendree	Super Region No. 3 Rank 5	November 18, 2019	At-Large Bid	None (Debut)	—	Super Region 3 Seed No. 4
Ohio Valley	Super Region No. 3 Rank 3	November 18, 2019	At-Large Bid	2 (2017, 2018)	Quarterfinals (2018)	Super Region 3 Seed No. 5
Cedarville	Super Region No. 3 Rank 6	November 18, 2019	At-Large Bid	1 (2015)	Second Round (2015)	Super Region 3 Seed No. 7
Fort Hays State	Super Region No. 3 Rank 8	November 18, 2019	At-Large Bid	7 (2012, 2013, 2014, 2015, 2016, 2017, 2018)	Semifinals (2018)	Super Region 3 Seed No. 8
UIndy	Super Region No. 3 Rank 9	November 18, 2019	At-Large Bid	3 (2013, 2015, 2017)	First Round (2013, 2015, 2017)	Super Region 3 Seed No. 8
Cal State LA	Super Region No. 4 Rank 2	November 18, 2019	At-Large Bid	13 (1981, 1992, 1994, 2006, 2008, 2009, 2011, 2012, 2013, 2014, 2015, 2016, 2017, 2018)	Runners-up (1981)	Super Region 4 Seed No. 2
St. Mary's (TX)	Super Region No. 4 Rank 3	November 18, 2019	At-Large Bid	None (Debut)	—	Super Region 4 Seed No. 3
Cal State San Bernardino	Super Region No. 4 Rank 4	November 18, 2019	At-Large Bid	3 (1991, 2009, 2010)	First Round (1991, 2009, 2010)	Super Region 4 Seed No. 5
UC San Diego	Super Region No. 4 Rank 8	November 18, 2019	At-Large Bid	4 (2003, 2013, 2014, 2016)	Semifinals (2016)	Super Region 4 Seed No. 7
Texas A&M International	Super Region No. 4 Rank 11	November 18, 2019	At-Large Bid	None (Debut)	—	Super Region 4 Seed No. 9

== Tournament bracket ==
=== Super-Region No. 1 ===
First Round
8	Millersville (PA)	2
9	Post	3
7	West Chester	1
10	Assumption (2OT)	2

Second Round
1	Adelphi	0
9	Post	1
4	Franklin Pierce	1
5	Wilmington (DE)	0
3	Charleston (WV)	5
6	Mercy	0
2	Gannon	5
10	Assumption	0

Third Round
9	Post	1
4	Franklin Pierce	2
3	Charleston (WV)	3
2	Gannon	0

Quarterfinals
4	Franklin Pierce	0
3	Charleston (WV)	2

* Host Institution

=== Super-Region No. 2 ===
First Round
8	Queens (NC) (PK)	1
9	Lee	1
7	Francis Marion	3
10	Limestone	2

Second Round
1	Lynn	1
8	Queens (NC)	0
4	Florida Tech	2
5	West Florida	1
3	Wingate	5
6	Young Harris	2
2	Palm Beach Atl.	2
7	Francis Marion	1

Third Round
1	Lynn	2
4	Florida Tech	1
3	Wingate	3
2	Palm Beach Atl.	1

Quarterfinals
1	Lynn	3
3	Wingate	0

=== Super-Region No. 3 ===
First Round
8	Fort Hays St.	2
9	UIndy	3
7	Cedarville (PK)	0
10	Wis.-Parkside	0

Second Round
1	Lake Erie	0
9	UIndy	2
4	McKendree	0
5	Ohio Valley	2
3	Maryville (MO)	1
6	Tiffin	0
2	Bellarmine (PK)	0
7	Cedarville	0

Third Round
9	UIndy	3
5	Ohio Valley	2
3	Maryville (MO)	2
2	Bellarmine	1

Quarterfinals
9	UIndy	1
3	Maryville (MO)	0

=== Super-Region No. 4 ===
First Round
8	Colo. Sch. of Mines	2
9	Tex. A&M Int'l	1
7	UC San Diego	0
10	Midwestern St.	1

Second Round
1	Azusa Pacific	1
8	Colo. Sch. of Mines	2
4	Cal Poly Pomona	0
5	CSU San B'dino	1
3	St. Mary's (TX)	5
6	Western Wash.	0
10	Midwestern St.	0
2	Cal State LA	3

Third Round
8	Colo. Sch. of Mines	1
5	CSU San B'dino	2
3	St. Mary's (TX)	1
2	Cal State LA (PK)	1

Quarterfinals
5	CSU San B'dino	0
2	Cal State LA	2

=== Division II College Cup ===
Semifinals; December 12, 2019; Highmark Stadium; Pittsburgh, Pennsylvania
1	Cal State LA	3
4	UIndy	0
2	Charleston (WV)	3
3	Lynn	1

Championship; December 14, 2019; Highmark Stadium; Pittsburgh, Pennsylvania
1	Cal State LA	0
2	Charleston (WV)	2

== Final ==
December 14, 2019
15:00 EST (UTC−5)

Charleston (WV)	2–0	Cal State Los Angeles
Freddy Tracey 9:14', 73:59' (Cabañas); Williams N'Dah (yellow card) 48:49'	Report	Carl Solli (yellow card) 38:27'; Tim Klefisch (yellow card) 49:42'

Highmark Stadium, Pittsburgh, Pennsylvania
Attendance: 112
Referee: Dimitar Chavdarov
