= 2011 Big Ten Conference men's soccer season =

Big Ten Conference
- Season: 2011
- Champions: Northwestern
- Premiers: Northwestern
- NCAA Tournament: Indiana; Northwestern

2011 Big Ten Conference men's soccer standings
	Conf.					Overall
Team	W		L		T	W		L		T
Northwestern†	4	–	0	–	2	11	–	5	–	5
Ohio State	4	–	2	–	0	10	–	7	–	2
Wisconsin	4	–	2	–	0	10	–	8	–	2
No. 9 Indiana	3	–	1	–	2	13	–	4	–	5
Michigan State	2	–	2	–	2	7	–	8	–	4
Michigan	1	–	5	–	0	5	–	14	–	1
Penn State	0	–	6	–	0	9	–	9	–	4
As of October 11, 2011; Rankings from NSCAA

The 2011 Big Ten Conference men's soccer season was the 21st season of men's varsity soccer in the conference. Northwestern won both the regular season and the Big Ten Tournament.

== Preseason ==
Indiana was picked to be the winner of the regular season.

=== Preseason poll ===
Projected Rank	School	2010 Finish
1	Indiana	1st
2	Ohio State	T-2nd
3	Penn State	T-4th
4	Michigan	T-2nd
5	Michigan State	6th
6	Northwestern	T-4th
7	Wisconsin	7th

== Teams ==
=== Stadia and locations ===
Team	Location	Stadium	Capacity
Indiana Hoosiers	Bloomington, Indiana	Armstrong Stadium	6,000
Michigan Wolverines	Ann Arbor, Michigan	U-M Soccer Stadium	2,200
Michigan State Spartans	East Lansing, Michigan	DeMartin Soccer Complex	2,500
Northwestern Wildcats	Evanston, Illinois	Lakeside Field	2,000
Ohio State Buckeyes	Columbus, Ohio	Owens Memorial Stadium	10,000
Penn State Nittany Lions	State College, Pennsylvania	Jeffrey Field	5,000
Wisconsin Badgers	Madison, Wisconsin	McClimon Stadium	2,000

- Illinois, Iowa, Minnesota, Nebraska and Purdue do not sponsor men's soccer

=== Personnel ===
Team	Head coach	Shirt supplier
Indiana	(United States) Todd Yeagley	(Germany) Adidas
Michigan	(United States) Steve Burns	(Germany) Adidas
Michigan State	(United States) Damon Rensing	(United States) Nike
Northwestern	(United States) Tim Lenahan	(United States) Under Armour
Ohio State	(United States) John Bluem	(United States) Nike
Penn State	(United States) Bob Warming	(United States) Nike
Wisconsin	(United States) John Trask	(Germany) Adidas

== Regular season ==
=== Results ===
Home \ Away	IND	MIC	MSU	NOR	OSU	PSU	WIS
Indiana	—	—	2–2	—	1–0	1–0	—
Michigan	1–4	—	—	0–1	—	—	1–2
Michigan State	—	1–0	—	—	1–2	1–0	—
Northwestern	2–2	—	1–1	—	—	—	1–0
Ohio State	—	3–2	—	2–3	—	1–0	—
Penn State	—	1–2	—	0–1	—	—	0–1
Wisconsin	2–0	—	1–0	—	0–2	—	—

Source: Team Statistics
Legend: Blue = home team win; Yellow = draw; Red = away team win.

== Postseason ==
=== Big Ten Tournament ===
Quarterfinals
4	Indiana	2
5	Michigan State	1
2	Ohio State	0
7	Penn State	2
3	Wisconsin	2
6	Michigan	0

Semifinals
1	Northwestern	1(3)
4	Indiana	1(2)
7	Penn State	1
3	Wisconsin	0

Championship
1	Northwestern	2
7	Penn State	1

==== Quarterfinals ====
November 9 QF	Michigan State	1–2	Indiana	Ann Arbor, Michigan
1:00 pm ET		report		Stadium: U-M Soccer Stadium

November 9 QF	Penn State	2–0	Ohio State	Ann Arbor, Michigan
3:45 pm ET		report		Stadium: U-M Soccer Stadium

QF	Wisconsin	2–0	Michigan	Ann Arbor, Michigan
6:30 pm ET		report		Stadium: U-M Soccer Stadium

==== Semifinals ====
November 11 SF	Indiana	1–1 (a.e.t.) (2–3 p)	Northwestern	Ann Arbor, Michigan
1:00 pm ET		report		Stadium: U-M Soccer Stadium

November 11 SF	Penn State	1–0	Wisconsin	Ann Arbor, Michigan
3:30 pm ET		report		Stadium: U-M Soccer Stadium

==== Final ====
November 13 F	Penn State	1–2	Northwestern	Ann Arbor, Michigan
12:00 pm ET		report		Stadium: U-M Soccer Stadium

=== NCAA Tournament ===
Seed	Region	School	1st Round	2nd Round	3rd Round
16	1	Indiana	BYE	W 3–0 vs. Old Dominion – (Bloomington)	L, 0–1 vs. North Carolina – (Chapel Hill)
—	3	Northwestern	L, 1–3 vs. Akron – (Akron)		

== See also ==
- Big Ten Conference
- 2011 Big Ten Conference Men's Soccer Tournament
- 2011 NCAA Division I men's soccer season
- 2011 in American soccer
