= 2014 NCAA Division II men's soccer tournament =

2014 NCAA Division II Men's Soccer Championship
Men's Division II College Cup (semifinals & final)

Tournament details
- Country: United States
- Teams: 35

Final positions
- Champions: Lynn (3rd title, 5th final)
- Runners-up: Charleston (WV) (1st final)

Tournament statistics
- Matches played: 34
- Goals scored: 97 (2.85 per match)

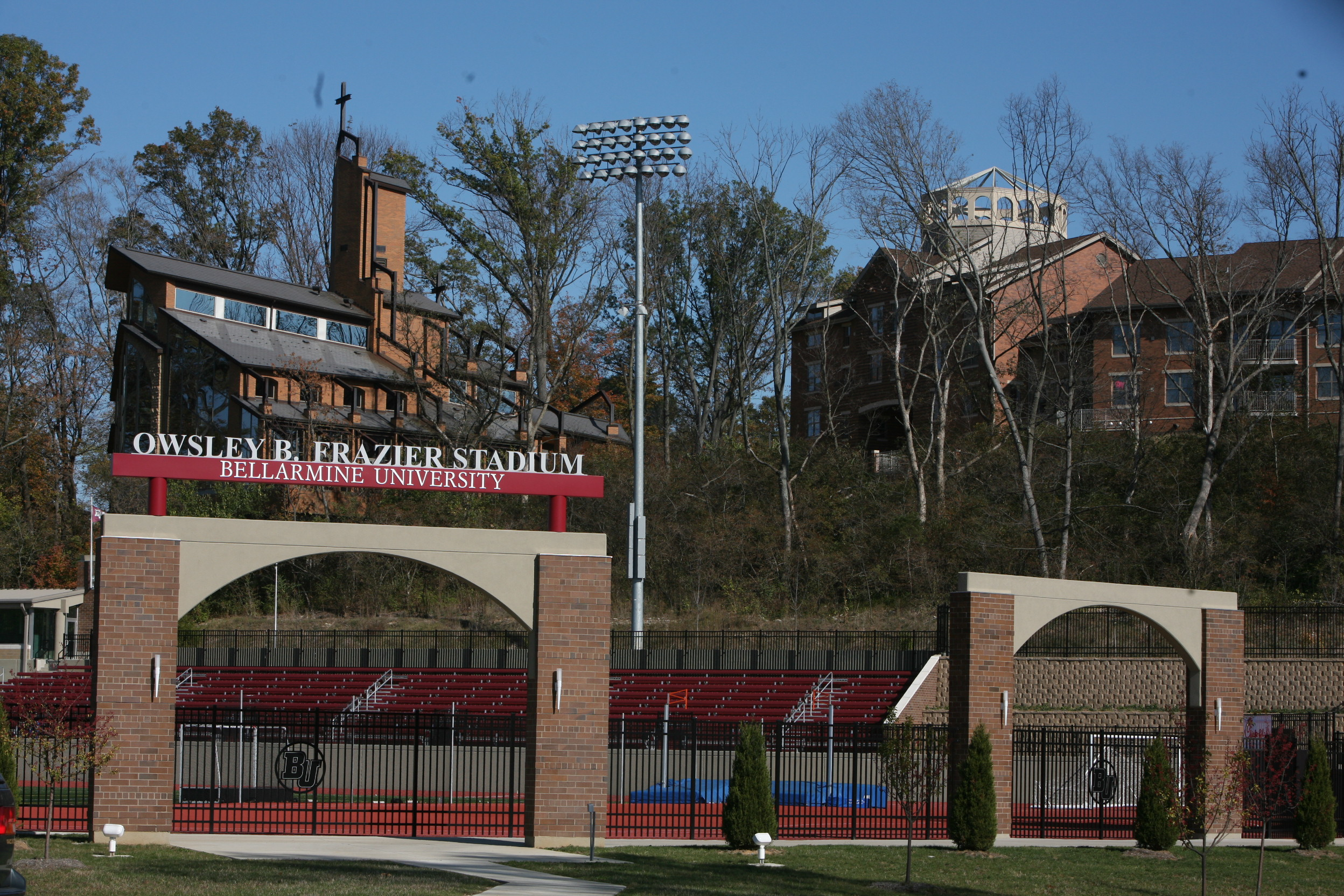
Owsley B. Frazier Stadium, at Bellarmine University, site of the 2014 Division II Men's and Women's College Cups.

The 2014 NCAA Division II men's soccer championship featured 35 schools in four unbalanced Super-Regional tournaments involving seven to ten teams each. Super-Regional games were played at campus sites.

The Division II College Cup was held at Owsley B. Frazier Stadium in Louisville, Kentucky as part of the NCAA Division II National Championships Fall Festival, hosted by Bellarmine University and the Louisville Sports Commission. The Lynn University Fighting Knights defeated the University of Charleston Golden Eagles 3–2 to win their third DII title and their second in three years.

== East Super-Regional ==
First Round; Thursday & Friday, November 13 &14
4 | NYIT | 0
5 | LIU Post (NY) | 2
3 | Merrimack (MA) | 2
6 | Philadelphia U. | 0

Second Round; Saturday & Sunday, November 15 &16
5 | LIU Post (PK 6–5) | 2
1 | Southern N.H. | 2
3 | Merrimack | 1
2 | Southern Connecticut State | 0
1 | Charleston (WV) | 5
4 | Bloomsburg (PA) | 0
2 | Mercyhurst (PA) | 1
3 | Notre Dame (OH) | 0

Third Round; Friday, November 21
5 | LIU Post | 2
3 | Merrimack | 0
1 | Charleston | 1
2 | Mercyhurst | 0

Quarterfinals; Sunday, November 23
5 | LIU Post | 0
1 | Charleston | 1

== Midwest Super-Regional ==
First Round; Friday, November 14
4 | Drury (MO) | 1
5 | Tiffin (OH) | 0

Second Round; Sunday, November 16
1 | Quincy (IL) | 2
4 | Drury | 1
2 | Northwood (MI) | 2
3 | Saginaw Valley (MI) | 5

Third Round; Friday, November 21
1 | Quincy | 3
3 | Saginaw Valley | 0
1 | Northeastern State (OK) | 1
2 | Ft. Hays State (KS) (PK 3–2) | 1

Quarterfinals; Sunday, November 23
1 | Quincy | 3
2 | Fort Hays State | 2

== South Super-Regional ==
First Round; Thursday & Friday, November 13 & 14
4 | South Carolina Aiken | 1
5 | Pfeiffer (NC) | 3
3 | Wingate (NC) | 4
6 | Barton (NC) | 1

Second Round; Saturday & Sunday, November 15 & 16
2 | St. Leo (FL) (PK 5–4) | 2
3 | Christian Brothers (TN) | 2
1 | Young Harris (GA) | 6
5 | Pfeiffer | 0
2 | Limestone (SC) | 1
3 | Wingate | 0

Third Round; Friday, November 21
1 | Lynn (FL) | 3
2 | St. Leo | 0
1 | Young Harris | 3
2 | Limestone | 1

Quarterfinals; Sunday, November 23
1 | Lynn | 4
1 | Young Harris | 1

== West Super-Regional ==
First Round; Thursday, November 13
4 | Northwest Nazarene (ID) | 1
5 | Simon Fraser (BC) | 0
3 | Cal State L.A. (PK 5–4) | 1
4 | UC San Diego | 1

Second Round; Saturday & Sunday, November 15 & 16
1 | Seattle Pacific (WA) | 2
4 | Northwest Nazarene | 1
2 | Azusa Pacific (CA) | 0
3 | Cal State L.A. | 1
2 | Colorado Mesa | 1
3 | Midwestern State (TX) | 0

Third Round; Friday, November 21
1 | Seattle Pacific | 0
3 | Cal State L.A. | 1
1 | St. Edward's (TX) | 1
2 | Colorado Mesa | 2

Quarterfinals; Sunday, November 23
3 | Cal State L.A. | 0
2 | Colorado Mesa | 1

== Division II College Cup at Louisville, Kentucky. ==
National Semifinals; Thursday, December 4
1 | Charleston (WV) | 2
2 | Colorado Mesa | 0
1 | Lynn (FL) | 4
1 | Quincy (IL) | 1

National Championship; Saturday, December 6
1 | Charleston | 2
1 | Lynn | 3

Attendance: Semi #1 = 300; Semi #2 = 200; Final = 300

== Final ==
December 6, 2014
12:00 PM

| Lynn | 3–2 | Charleston |
|---|---|---|
| Nicholas Mortensen 3:24'; Christopher Hellmann 6:45', 31:35' | Report 1 Report 2 | Jules Gabbiadini 78:55'; Will Roberts 89:19' (pen.) |

Owsley B. Frazier Stadium, Louisville, Kentucky
Attendance: 300
Referee: Rob Sibiga
