= 2012 Big Ten men's soccer tournament =

2012 Big Ten Conference men's soccer tournament
Tournament details
- Country: United States
- Teams: 7

Final positions
- Champions: Michigan State
- Runners-up: Michigan

2012 Big Ten Conference men's soccer standings
| | Conf. | | | | | Overall |
| Team | W | | L | | T | W | | L | | T |
|---|---|---|---|---|---|---|---|---|---|---|
| Penn State | 3 | – | 1 | – | 2 | 9 | – | 5 | – | 3 |
| No. 18 Northwestern | 3 | – | 1 | – | 2 | 13 | – | 6 | – | 4 |
| Michigan | 3 | – | 2 | – | 1 | 11 | – | 10 | – | 1 |
| No. 1 Indiana | 3 | – | 2 | – | 1 | 16 | – | 5 | – | 3 |
| Michigan State† | 3 | – | 3 | – | 0 | 11 | – | 10 | – | 1 |
| Wisconsin | 1 | – | 3 | – | 2 | 6 | – | 8 | – | 5 |
| Ohio State | 0 | – | 4 | – | 2 | 6 | – | 10 | – | 3 |
As of December 11, 2012; Rankings from NSCAA

The 2012 Big Ten Conference men's soccer tournament was the 22nd postseason tournament to decide the Big Ten Conference champion and guaranteed representative into the 2012 NCAA Division I Men's Soccer Championship. The tournament was held at Lakeside Field at Northwestern University in Evanston, Illinois.

Michigan State beat Michigan in the championship game.

== Bracket ==
Quarterfinals
4 | Indiana | 1
5 | Michigan State | 2
2 | Northwestern | 2
7 | Ohio State | 0
3 | Michigan | 1
6 | Wisconsin | 0

Semifinals
1 | Penn State | 1
5 | Michigan State | 3
2 | Northwestern | 0
3 | Michigan | 3

Championship
5 | Michigan State (OT) | 2
3 | Michigan | 1

== Schedule ==
=== Quarterfinals ===
| November 7 | Michigan State | 2–1 | Indiana | Evanston, IL |
| 13:00 CST | Montague 4'; Wilson (yellow card) 75'; Keener 77' | Report | Kotlov 84' | Stadium: Lakeside Field; Attendance: 384; Referee: Abbey Okulajae |

| November 7 | Wisconsin | 0–1 | Michigan | Evanston, IL |
| 15:30 CST | McCrudden (yellow card) 64'; Succa (yellow card) 86' | Report | Murphy 68' | Stadium: Lakeside Field; Attendance: 384; Referee: Cien Asoera |

| November 7 | Ohio State | 0–2 | Northwestern | Evanston, IL |
| 18:00 CST | Mason (yellow card) 6' | Report | Schickel 6'; Calistri 12'; Lakin (yellow card) 32' | Stadium: Lakeside Field; Attendance: 384 |

=== Semifinals ===
| November 9 | Michigan State | 3–1 | Penn State | Evanston, IL |
| 12:00 CST | Henderson 46'; Montague 54'; Conerty (yellow card) 74'; Chapman 86' | Report | Burham (yellow card) 54'; Warming (yellow card) 56'; Vu 88' | Stadium: Lakeside Field; Attendance: 382; Referee: Hilario Grajeda |

| November 9 | Michigan | 3–0 | Northwestern | Evanston, IL |
| 14:30 CST | Arnone 4'; Murphy (yellow card) 26'; Roehn 40'; Lussiez 53'; Opare (yellow card) 60' | Report | | Stadium: Lakeside Field; Attendance: 382; Referee: Sorin Storica |

=== Final ===
| November 11 | Michigan State | 2–1 (a.e.t.) | Michigan | Evanston, IL |
| 12:00 CT | Montague 38'; Conerty 98' | Report | Keener 88' | Stadium: Lakeside Field; Attendance: 406; Referee: Jorge Cuate |

== See also ==
- Big Ten Conference Men's Soccer Tournament
- 2012 Big Ten Conference men's soccer season
- 2012 NCAA Division I Men's Soccer Championship
- 2012 NCAA Division I men's soccer season
