= Charleston Golden Eagles =

Athletic teams of the University of Charleston

- University: University of Charleston
- Nickname: Golden Eagles
- NCAA: Division II
- Conference: MEC (primary); EIVA (men's volleyball)
- Athletic director: Dr. Bren Stevens
- Location: Charleston, West Virginia
- Varsity teams: 19 (9 men's, 10 women's)
- Football stadium: UC Stadium at Laidley Field
- Basketball arena: H. Bernard Wehrle Senior Athletic Arena
- Baseball stadium: Welch Athletic Complex
- Softball stadium: UC Softball Field
- Tennis venue: Schoenbaum Tennis Courts
- Colors: Maroon and gold
- Mascot: MoHarv
- Website: ucgoldeneagles.com
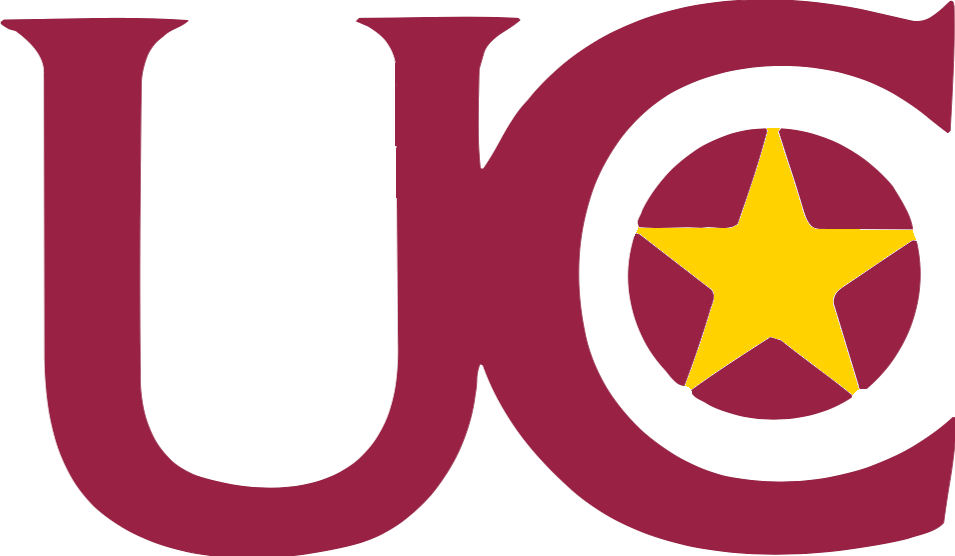

Team NCAA championships
- 2

The Charleston Golden Eagles, known previously as the Morris Harvey Golden Eagles, are the athletic teams that represent the University of Charleston, located in Charleston, West Virginia, in NCAA Division II intercollegiate sports. The Golden Eagles compete as members of the Mountain East Conference for all varsity sports except men's volleyball. Charleston was a founding member of the Mountain East following the 2013 demise of the West Virginia Intercollegiate Athletic Conference, of which Charleston had been a member since 1924. Prior to 1978, the university was called Morris Harvey College. Charleston's main rivals are the West Virginia State University Yellow Jackets.

== History ==
In June 2012, UC was one of nine members of the West Virginia Intercollegiate Athletic Conference (WVIAC) that announced their plans to leave to form a new Division II conference. Two months later, the new conference was unveiled as the MEC, with UC as one of 12 charter members. The school's newest sport is men's volleyball, which played its first season as a varsity program in spring 2015. Since men's volleyball has a combined national championship for Division I and Division II schools, UC competes as an effective Division I member in that sport; it spent its first season as an independent before joining the Eastern Intercollegiate Volleyball Association for the 2016 season and beyond.

In 2005, UC entered into a partnership with the local school board to refurbish the school board–owned Laidley Field, which was renamed University of Charleston Stadium. The campus also boasts new or renovated softball, football, baseball, and soccer fields, and competes in 18 Division II sports.

== Varsity teams ==
Men's sports	Women's sports
Baseball	Basketball
Basketball	Cheerleading
Cross Country	Cross Country
Football	Golf
Golf	Lacrosse
Soccer	Soccer
Tennis	Softball
Track & Field	Tennis
Volleyball^{1}	Track & Field
	Volleyball

Notes

- ^{1} = Men's volleyball competes in the Eastern Intercollegiate Volleyball Association.

== National championships ==
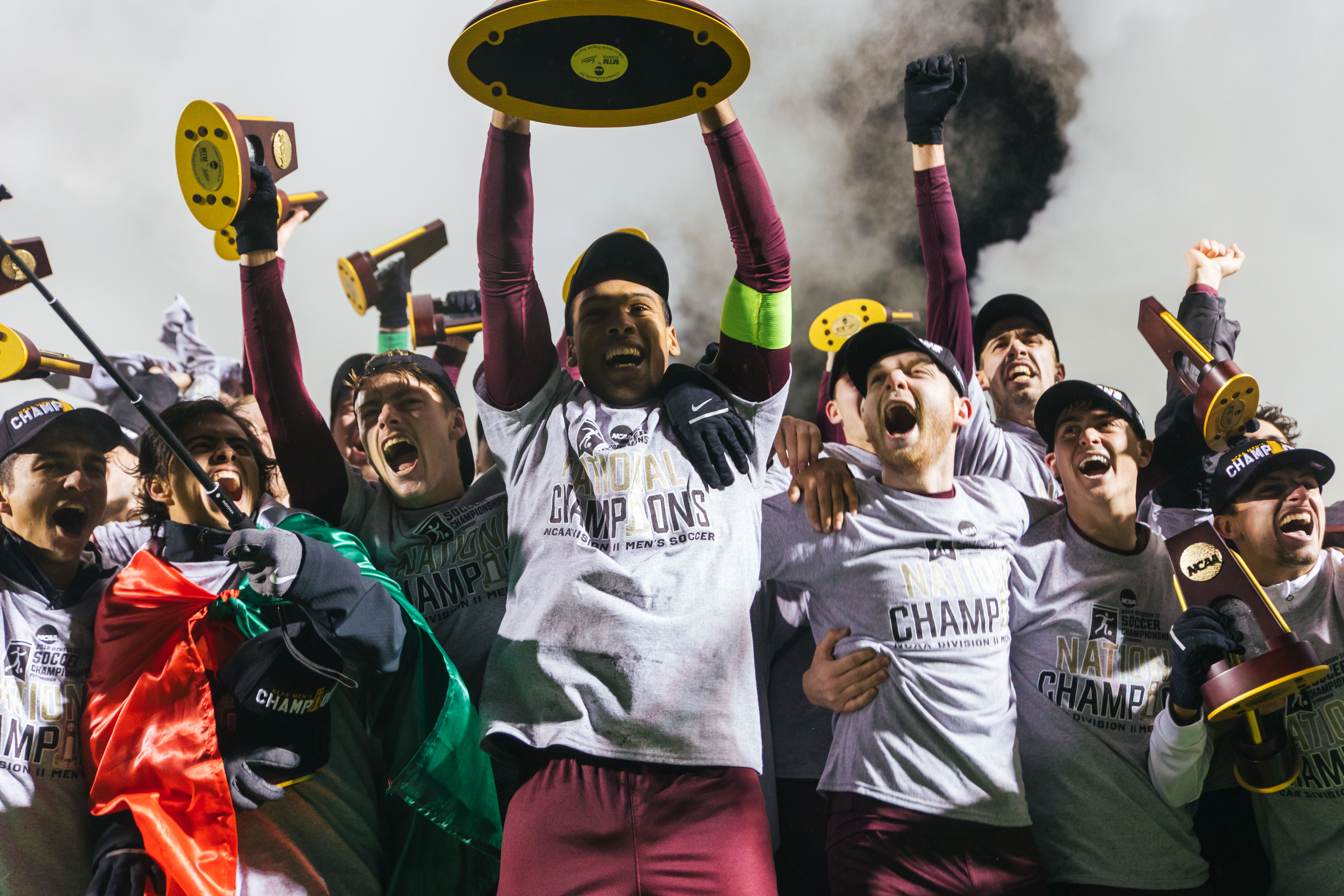
The University of Charleston men’s soccer team celebrates after winning its second NCAA Division II national championship in 2019.

=== Team ===
Sport	Titles	Assoc.	Division	Year	Rival	Score	Ref.
Soccer (men's)	2	NCAA	Division II	2017	Lynn	0–0 (a.e.t.) (3–1 p)	
Soccer (men's)	2	NCAA	Division II	2019	Cal State Los Angeles	2–0	
