= 2013 NCAA Division II men's soccer tournament =

2013 NCAA Division II Men's Soccer Championship
Men's Division II College Cup (semifinals & final)

Tournament details
- Country: United States
- Teams: 35

Final positions
- Champions: Southern New Hampshire University (2nd title, 3rd final)
- Runners-up: Carson-Newman University (1st final)

Tournament statistics
- Matches played: 34
- Goals scored: 89 (2.62 per match)

The 2013 NCAA Division II men's soccer championship featured 35 schools in four unbalanced Super-Regional tournaments involving seven to ten teams each. Super-Regional games were played at campus sites.

The Division II College Cup was held at Blanchard Woods Park in Evans, Georgia, and was hosted by the Peach Belt Conference.

In the national semifinals, Rockhurst (17-3-3) was defeated by Southern New Hampshire 2–1, and Simon Fraser (17-2-2) fell to Carson-Newman 3–2. Southern New Hampshire (21-1-1) won its second Division II crown by beating Carson-Newman (16-5-1) 2–1 in the national final.

== East Super-Regional ==
First Round; Thursday & Friday, November 14 &15
Dowling	2
NYIT	1
Post	1
Wilmington (DE)	2

Second Round; Saturday & Sunday, November 16 &17
LIU Post	6
Dowling	1
Southern N.H.	3
Wilmington	0
Slippery Rock	1
Millersville	2
Notre Dame (OH)	0
Mercyhurst	1

Third Round; Friday, November 22
LIU Post	0
Southern N.H.	2
Millersville	1
Mercyhurst	3

Quarterfinals; Sunday, November 24
Southern N.H. (5–4 PK)	0
Mercyhurst	0

== Midwest Super-Regional ==
First Round; Friday, November 15
Indianapolis	0
Lewis (4–3 PK)	0

Second Round; Sunday, November 17
Ohio Dominican	0
Lewis	1
Tiffin	1
Rockhurst (8–7 PK)	1

Third Round; Friday, November 22
Lewis	0
Rockhurst	2
Lindenwood	1
Ft. Hays State	0

Quarterfinals; Sunday, November 24
Rockhurst	1
Lindenwood	0

== South Super-Regional ==
First Round; Thursday & Friday, November 14 & 15
Carson–Newman	3
Anderson (SC)	2
Lander	3
Flagler	0

Second Round; Saturday & Sunday, November 16 & 17
St. Leo	1
West Florida (PK 4–2)	1
Limestone College	1
Carson-Newman	3
Queens (NC)	1
Lander	2

Third Round; Friday, November 22
Rollins	4
West Florida	1
Carson-Newman (PK 4–2)	0
Lander	0

Quarterfinals; Sunday, November 24
Rollins	1
Carson-Newman	4

== West Super-Regional ==
First Round; Thursday, November 14
Simon Fraser	5
Cal Baptist	0
Chico State	1
Seattle Pacific	0

Second Round; Saturday, November 16
Cal State, L.A.	1
Simon Fraser	2
UC San Diego (PK 5–4)	1
Chico State	1
Midwestern State	1
Colorado Mines	0

Third Round; Friday, November 22
Simon Fraser (PK 4–3)	1
UC San Diego	1
Regis (CO)	2
Midwestern State	1

Quarterfinals; Sunday, November 24
Simon Fraser	1
Regis	0

== Division II College Cup at Evans, Ga. ==
National Semifinals; December 5
Southern N.H.	2
Rockhurst	1
Carson-Newman	3
Simon Fraser	2

National Championship; December 7
Southern N.H.	2
Carson-Newman	1

Attendance: Semi #1 = N/A; Semi #2 = N/A; Final = 1200

== Final ==
December 7, 2013
3:00 PM

Southern New Hampshire	2–1	Carson–Newman
Miguel Carneiro 72:58' (Francolini); Christian Rodriguez (yellow card) 82:54'; Pierre Omanga 85:33' (pen.); Mohamed Toufik (red card) 87:54'	Report 1 Report 2	Matheus Bachi (yellow card) 29:52', (red card) 87:54'; Joao Pedro Dowsley (red card) 87:54'; Ross Frame 89:54'

Blanchard Woods Park, Evans, Georgia
Attendance: 1,200
Referee: Dan Radford
