= 2011 North Carolina Tar Heels men's soccer team =

American college soccer season

2011 North Carolina Tar Heels men's soccer

National Champions

ACC Regular Season Champions ACC Men's Soccer Tournament Champions

NCAA Tournament, College Cup vs. Charlotte, W 1–0
- Conference: Atlantic Coast Conference

Ranking
- Coaches: No. 1
- Record: 21–2–3 (5–1–2 ACC)
- Head coach: Carlos Somoano (1st season)
- Assistant coach: Grant Porter (1st season)
- Home stadium: Fetzer Field

2011 Atlantic Coast Conference men's soccer standings
	Conf.					Overall
Team	W		L		T	W		L		T
No. 1 North Carolina †	5	–	1	–	2	21	–	2	–	3
No. 9 Maryland	4	–	2	–	2	14	–	4	–	3
Virginia	4	–	3	–	1	12	–	8	–	`
Duke	4	–	3	–	1	11	–	8	–	3
Wake Forest	4	–	3	–	1	8	–	8	–	5
No. 15 Boston College	4	–	4	–	0	14	–	6	–	1
Clemson	4	–	4	–	0	8	–	8	–	2
NC State	2	–	6	–	0	7	–	11	–	2
Virginia Tech	1	–	6	–	1	4	–	13	–	2
† 2011 ACC Tournament winner As of December 13, 2011; Rankings from NSCAA

The 2011 North Carolina Tar Heels men's soccer team represented the University of North Carolina at Chapel Hill in all NCAA Division I men's soccer competitions. The Tar Heels were coached by Carlos Somoano. It was Somoano's first season in charge of the Tar Heels following Elmar Bolowich's departure to coach the Creighton Bluejays men's soccer program.

The season proved to be one of the most successful seasons in program history. The Tar Heels completed a college "treble", winning the ACC regular season, the ACC Tournament and the NCAA Tournament.

== Team ==
=== Roster ===
The following players were on the roster during the 2011 season.

Note: Flags indicate national team as defined under FIFA eligibility rules; some limited exceptions apply. Players may hold more than one non-FIFA nationality.

No.	Pos.	Nation	Player
1	GK	(United States) USA	Scott Goodwin
2	DF	(The Bahamas) BAH	Anton Sealey
3	DF	(United States) USA	Kirk Urso
4	DF	(United States) USA	Boyd Okwuonu
5	MF	(United States) USA	Mikey Lopez
6	DF	(United States) USA	Matt Hedges
7	FW	(United States) USA	Josh Rice
8	MF	(United States) USA	Martin Murphy
9	DF	(United States) USA	Jordan McCrary
10	MF	(United States) USA	Billy Schuler
11	MF	(United States) USA	David Walden
12	GK	(United States) USA	Sam Euler
13	DF	(United States) USA	Ryan Dodson
14	MF	(United States) USA	Jordan Gafa

No.	Pos.	Nation	Player
15	FW	(United States) USA	Cameron Brown
16	MF	(Uruguay) URU	Enzo Martínez
17	FW	(United States) USA	Ben Speas
18	FW	(United States) USA	Carlos McCrary
19	DF	(Jamaica) JAM	Darvin Ebanks
20	DF	(United States) USA	Nathan Diehl
26	FW	(Netherlands) NED	Cooper Vandermaas-Peeler
22	DF	(Nigeria) NGA	C.J. Odenigwe
23	DF	(Northern Ireland) NIR	Drew McKinney
24	GK	(United States) USA	Brendan Moore
25	FW	(United States) USA	Rob Lovejoy
26	MF	(United States) USA	Glen Long
28	MF	(United States) USA	Alex Walters
29	DF	(Canada) CAN	Daniel Tannous

== Match results ==
Date Time, TV	Rank^{#}	Opponent^{#}	Result	Record	Site (Attendance) City, State
Preseason
Regular Season
08-27-2011*; 7:00 pm	No. 3	UNC Wilmington	W 3–1	1–0–0	Fetzer Field (2,565); Chapel Hill, NC
09-02-2011*; 7:00 pm	No. 2	Oregon State	W 5–1	2–0–0	Fetzer Field (2,410); Chapel Hill, NC
09-04-2011*; 7:00 pm, FSC	No. 2	No. 1 Louisville	W 2–1	3–0–0	Fetzer Field (3,425); Chapel Hill, NC
09-10-2011; 7:00 pm, ACCN	No. 1	at Virginia Tech	L 0–1 ^{2OT}	3–1–0 (0–1–0)	Thompson Field (2,052); Blacksburg, VA
09-13-2011*; 7:00 pm	No. 4	James Madison	W 4–1	4–1–0	Fetzer Field (416); Chapel Hill, NC
09-16-2011; 7:00 pm, ACCN+	No. 8	at Wake Forest; Tobacco Road	W 1–0	5–1–0 (1–1–0)	Spry Stadium (4,062); Winston-Salem, NC
09-20-2011*; 7:00 pm	No. 4	at Wofford	W 1–0	6–1–0	Snyder Field (632); Spartanburg, SC
09-23-2011; 7:00 pm, ACCN	No. 4	at Virginia; South's Oldest Rivalry	W 3–0	7–1–0 (2–1–0)	Klöckner Stadium (2,539); Charlottesville, VA
09-27-2011*; 7:00 pm	No. 4	No. 15 Old Dominion	W 3–0	8–1–0	Fetzer Field (203); Chapel Hill, NC
09-30-2011; 7:00 pm	No. 3	Duke; Rivalry	T 2–2 ^{2OT}	8–1–1 (3–1–1)	Fetzer Field (4,825); Chapel Hill, NC
10-04-2011*; 7:00 pm	No. 3	UNC Asheville	W 2–1	9–1–1	Fetzer Field (325); Chapel Hill, NC
10-07-2011; 7:30 pm	No. 3	Clemson	W 2–0	10–1–1 (3–1–1)	Fetzer Field (1,917); Chapel Hill, NC
10-14-2011*; 7:00 pm	No. 2	Charleston	W 4–2	11–1–1	Fetzer Field (516); Chapel Hill, NC
10-17-2011*; 7:00 pm	No. 2	at Davidson	L 0–1	11–2–1	Alumni Soccer Stadium (1,941); Davidson, NC
10-21-2011; 5:30 pm, FSC	No. 2	No. 3 Maryland	T 2–2 ^{2OT}	11–2–2 (3–1–2)	Fetzer Field (1,175); Chapel Hill, NC
10-25-2011*; 7:00 pm, ACCN+	No. 3	at No. 25 South Carolina; Battle of the Carolinas	W 4–0	12–2–2	Stone Stadium (1,710); Columbia, SC
10-28-2011; 7:00 pm, ACCN+	No. 3	NC State; Rivalry	W 2–1 ^{OT}	13–2–2 (4–1–2)	Fetzer Field (710); Chapel Hill, NC
11-02-2011; 7:00 pm	No. 3	at No. 10 Boston College	W 2–0	14–2–2 (5–1–2)	Newton Soccer Complex (782); Chestnut Hill, MA
ACC Tournament
11-08-2011; 7:00 pm, ACCN+	(1) No. 3	(8) NC State; Quarterfinals	W 4–0	15–2–2	Fetzer Field (562); Chapel Hill, NC
11-11-2011; 5:30 pm, ACCN	(1) No. 3	vs. (4) No. 25 Virginia; Semifinals	W 1–0 ^{OT}	16–2–2	WakeMed Soccer Park (1,054); Cary, NC
11-13-2011; 12:00 pm, ESPN3	(1) No. 3	vs. (7) No. 13 Boston College; ACC Championship	W 3–1	17–2–2	WakeMed Soccer Park (1,392); Cary, NC
NCAA Tournament
11-20-2011*; 5:00 pm, ACCN	(1) No. 1	No. 20 Coastal Carolina; Second Round	W 3–2	18–2–2	Fetzer Field (1,054); Chapel Hill, NC
11-27-2011*; 1:00 pm, ESPNU	(1) No. 1	(16) No. 16 Indiana; Round of 16	W 1–0 ^{OT}	19–2–2	Fetzer Field (1,504); Chapel Hill, NC
12-03-2011*; 5:00 pm, ESPNU	(1) No. 1	Saint Mary's; Quarterfinals	W 2–0	20–2–2	Fetzer Field (5,810); Chapel Hill, NC
NCAA College Cup
12-09-2011*; 8:30 pm, ESPNU	(1) No. 1	vs. (13) No. 8 UCLA; Semifinals	T 2–2; W 3–1 PK ^{2OT}	20–2–3	Regions Park (9,623); Hoover, AL
12-11-2011*; 4:00 pm, ESPN2	(1) No. 1	vs. No. 14 Charlotte; National Championship	W 1–0	21–2–3	Regions Park (8,777); Hoover, AL
*Non-conference game. ^{#}Rankings from United Soccer Coaches. (#) Tournament seedings in parentheses.
