= 2011 NCAA Division I men's soccer tournament =

Men's College Cup (semifinals & final)

Tournament details
- Country: United States
- Teams: 48

Final positions
- Champions: North Carolina
- Runners-up: Charlotte
- Semifinalists: Creighton; UCLA

Tournament statistics
- Matches played: 47
- Goals scored: 127 (2.7 per match)
- Top goal scorer: Casey Townsend (4)

The 2011 NCAA Division I men's soccer tournament was a single-elimination tournament involving 48 teams to determine the champion of the 2011 NCAA Division I men's soccer season. The 53rd edition of the tournament began on November 17, 2011 and culminated with the North Carolina Tar Heels defeating the Charlotte 49ers, 1–0, in the final on December 13 at Regions Park in Hoover, Alabama.

While the tournament resulted in few upsets, most national soccer headlines were made behind Charlotte's run to the final. The 49ers entered the tournament through an at-large bid, and were not seeded. Despite that, they were able to defeat defending champions, the Akron Zips, 1–0, in the third round, and then the Connecticut Huskies, 4–2, in a penalty shootout to advance to the College Cup. Joining the Tar Heels and the 49ers in the College Cup were the UCLA Bruins and the Creighton Bluejays.

With the victory in the national final, the Tar Heels won their second NCAA Division I Men's Soccer Championship in program history.

== Qualified Teams ==
A total of 48 teams will qualify into the tournament proper, either automatically, or through an at-large bid that is determined by a selection committee. Each conference that field varsity soccer teams are admitted one automatic berth into the tournament. Depending on the conference, that automatic berth is either given the champions of the regular season, or the tournament that culminates the regular season. Twenty-two teams earn automatic bids into the tournament, while 26 enter through an at-large bid.

=== Automatic bids ===
Team	Conference	Last Appearance	Appearances
Stony Brook	America East Conference	2009	3
UNC	Atlantic Coast Conference	2010	19
Florida Gulf Coast	Atlantic Sun Conference	N/A	1
Xavier	Atlantic 10 Conference	2010	2
St. John's	Big East Conference	2009	10
Liberty	Big South Conference	2007	2
Northwestern	Big Ten Conference	2009	
UC Irvine	Big West Conference	2009	
Delaware	Colonial Athletic Association	1970	3
SMU	Conference USA	2010	23
Loyola	Horizon League	2008	3
Dartmouth	Ivy League	2010	26
Fairfield	Metro Atlantic Athletic Conference	2008	4
Northern Illinois	Mid-American Conference	2006	4
Creighton	Missouri Valley Conference	2010	19
New Mexico	Mountain Pacific Sports Federation	2010	
Monmouth	Northeast Conference	2010	9
UCLA	Pac-12 Conference	2010	31
Colgate	Patriot League	2008	
Elon	Southern Conference	N/A	1
Western Illinois	The Summit League	2009	
Saint Mary's	West Coast Conference	2009	

=== At-Large Bids ===
Conference	Team	Last Appearance	Appearances
ACC	Duke	2010	
ACC	Virginia	2010	25
ACC	Boston College	2010	
ACC	Maryland	2010	14
ACC	Wake Forest	2009	15
A10	Charlotte	2009	
Big East	Rutgers	2006	
Big East	Louisville	2010	
Big East	South Florida	2010	16
Big East	Connecticut	2010	32
Big East	Providence	2010	
Big East	West Virginia	2010	13
Big South	Coastal Carolina	2010	
Big 10	Indiana	2010	36
Big West	UC Santa Barbara	2010	10
CAA	James Madison	2005	13
CAA	Georgia State		
CAA	Old Dominion	2010	13
Conference USA	South Carolina	2005	19
Conference USA	UAB		
Conference USA	Central Florida	2010	
Ivy League	Brown	2010	
Mid-American	Akron	2010	13
Missouri Valley	Bradley	2010	
Mtn Pac Sports Fed	CSU Bakersfield		
Southern	Furman		

== Format ==
Like previous editions of the NCAA Division I Tournament, the tournament featured 64 participants out of a possible field of 198 teams. Of the 64 berths, 22 were allocated to the conference tournament or regular season winners. The remaining 42 berths were determined through an at-large process based upon teams' Ratings Percentage Index that did not win their conference tournament. The most at-large berths went to schools from the Big East and Atlantic Coast conferences, containing half of the tournament field's at-large berths (six and five berths, respectively). Of the remaining 11 berths, six were from the Colonial Athletic and Conference USA conferences, each earning three berths.

From there, the NCAA Selection Committee selected the top sixteen seeds for the tournament, that earned an automatic bye to the second round of the tournament. The remaining 48 teams played in a single-elimination match in the first round of the tournament, to play a seeded team in the second round.

Similar to the Lamar Hunt U.S. Open Cup, each of the tournament rounds were single-elimination. However, matches tied at the end of regulation went to two 10-minute golden goal periods, followed by a penalty shoot-out, if necessary. All matches in the first, second and third rounds, as well as the quarterfinals, were hosted by the higher seed. The College Cup, also known as the semifinals and final for the tournament were held at a neutral venue, this time being at Regions Park in Hoover, Alabama (south of Birmingham).

=== Seeded teams ===
Seeded teams
Seed	School	Conference	Record	Berth type
1	North Carolina	ACC	16–2–2	Tournament winner
2	Creighton	MVC	17–2–0	Tournament winner
3	Connecticut	Big East	14–2–2	At-large
4	Boston College	ACC	14–5–0	At-large
5	Maryland	ACC	12–3–3	At-large
6	SMU	C-USA	13–5–1	Tournament winner
7	South Florida	Big East	11–3–3	At-large
8	UC Irvine	Big West	16–4–1	At-large
9	St. John's	Big East	14–5–2	Tournament winner
10	New Mexico	MPSF	16–0–3	Tournament winner
11	UAB	C-USA	13–3–3	At-large
12	Louisville	Big East	11–6–2	At-large
13	UCLA	Pac-12	14–4–1	Tournament winner
14	James Madison	CAA	11–4–2	At-large
15	UC Santa Barbara	Big West	13–6–1	At-large
16	Indiana	Big Ten	11–3–5	At-large

== Schedule ==
Round	Date
First round	November 17, 2011
Second round	November 20, 2011
Third round	November 27, 2011
Quarterfinals	December 3, 2011
College Cup: Semifinals	December 9, 2011
College Cup Final	December 11, 2011

== Bracket ==
=== Regional 1 ===
First round
Elon	3
Coastal Carolina*	4
Liberty	0(4)
Old Dominion*	0(5)
Fairfield	2
Brown*	3
Saint Mary's	1
CSU Bakersfield*	0

Second round
Coastal Carolina	2
1	North Carolina	3
16	Indiana	3
Old Dominion	0
Brown	1
9	St. John's	0
8	UC Irvine	1
Saint Mary's	2/2OT

Third round
1	North Carolina	1/OT
16	Indiana	0
Brown	2
Saint Mary's	3/OT

Quarterfinals
1	North Carolina	2
Saint Mary's	0

=== Regional 2 ===
First round
Xavier	1
West Virginia*	2/OT
Loyola-Chicago	1
Bradley*	2
Delaware	1/20T
Virginia*	0
Colgate	2
Rutgers*	4

Second round
West Virginia	0
5	Maryland	4
12	Louisville	3/2OT
Bradley	2
Delaware	0
13	UCLA	1
4	Boston College	1(3)
Rutgers	1(4)

Third round
5	Maryland	2
12	Louisville	4
13	UCLA	3
Rutgers	0

Quarterfinals
12	Louisville	0
13	UCLA	1/2OT

=== Regional 3 ===
First round
Stony Brook	0(4)
Monmouth*	0(5)
Wake Forest	1(4)
South Carolina*	1(3)
Furman	1
Charlotte*	3
Northwestern	1
Akron*	3

Second round
Monmouth	1
3	Connecticut	2
14	James Madison	2
Wake Forest	0
Charlotte	3
11	UAB	1
6	SMU	2
Akron	3

Third round
3	Connecticut	3
14	James Madison	0
Charlotte*	1
Akron	0

Quarterfinals
3	Connecticut	1(2)
Charlotte	1(4)

=== Regional 4 ===
First round
Florida Gulf Coast	0
UCF*	1/2OT
Georgia State	0
Duke*	1
Dartmouth	0
Providence*	1
Western Illinois	0
Northern Illinois*	3

Second round
UCF	1
7	South Florida	2/OT
10	New Mexico	2/OT
Duke	1
Providence	2
15	UC Santa Barbara	3
2	Creighton	3
Northern Illinois	0

Third round
7	South Florida	0(6)
10	New Mexico	0(5)
15	UC Santa Barbara	1
2	Creighton	2

Quarterfinals
7	South Florida	0
2	Creighton	1/OT

=== College Cup – Regions Park, Hoover, Alabama ===
National Semifinals; December 9
1	North Carolina	2(3)
13	UCLA	2(1)
Charlotte	0(4)
2	Creighton	0(1)

National Championship; December 11
1	North Carolina	1
Charlotte	0

== Schedule ==
Host team, or higher seed, is listed on the right. Away team or lower seed is listed on the left.

=== First round ===
November 17, 2011
13:00 ET

Dartmouth	0–1	Providence
	Report	Raley 10'

Glay Field
Providence, Rhode Island
Attendance: 581
Referee: John Collins

November 17, 2011
14:00 ET

Western Illinois	0–3	Northern Illinois
	Report	Totsch 20'; Kannah 43'; Mascitti 73'

Huskie Soccer Field
DeKalb, Illinois
Attendance: 528
Referee: Michael Kennedy

November 17, 2011
17:00 ET

Xavier	1–2 (a.e.t.)	West Virginia
DePaol 85'	Report	Williams 39'; Schoenle 99'

Dick Dlesk Soccer Stadium
Morgantown, West Virginia
Attendance: 253
Referee: Peter Dhima

November 17, 2011
19:00 ET

Elon	3–4	Coastal Carolina
Thomas 48', 64'; Carroll 81'	Report	Garbanzo 35'; East 55'; Hendrick 72'; Bennett 83'

CCU Soccer Field
Conway, South Carolina
Attendance: 582
Referee: Rob Mann

November 17, 2011
19:00 ET

Liberty	0–0 (a.e.t.)	Old Dominion
	Report
Penalties
Bentick (penalty scored); Amoo (penalty scored); Aseweh (penalty scored); Breitmeyer (penalty scored); Bullock (penalty missed)	4–5	Francoz (penalty scored); Harmon (penalty scored); LeBlanc (penalty scored); Hopkinson (penalty scored); Smith (penalty scored)

ODU Soccer Complex
Norfolk, Virginia
Attendance: 373
Referee: Bill Ditmar

November 17, 2011
19:00 ET

Fairfield	2–3	Brown
Zuniga 32'; Shaw 40'	Report	Rosa 80'; Popolizio 81'; Leonard 86'

Stevenson Field
Providence, Rhode Island
Attendance: 529
Referee: Sean Nally

November 17, 2011
19:00 ET

Delaware	1–0 (a.e.t.)	Virginia
Dineen 106'	Report

Klöckner Stadium
Charlottesville, Virginia
Attendance: 588
Referee: Andrew Chapin

November 17, 2011
19:00 ET

Colgate	2–4	Rutgers
S. Miller 25'; Schuber 90'	Report	Knibbs 23'; Bourdeau 64'; Correa 82'; 85' (o.g.)

Yurcak Field
Piscataway, New Jersey
Attendance: 629
Referee: Noel Cotterell

November 17, 2011
19:00 ET

Stony Brook	0–0 (a.e.t.)	Monmouth
	Report
Penalties
Schlesinger (penalty scored); Gobeil (penalty scored); Crespi (penalty missed); Fernandes (penalty scored); Belakehal (penalty scored)	4–5	Allen (penalty scored); Luke (penalty scored); Schmid (penalty scored); Puranen (penalty scored); Vázquez (penalty scored)

The Great Lawn
West Long Branch, New Jersey
Attendance: 795
Referee: Alex Prus

November 17, 2011
19:00 ET

Wake Forest	1–1 (a.e.t.)	South Carolina
Tomaselli 9'	Report	Root 50' (pen.)
Penalties
Wenzel (penalty scored); Gimenez (penalty scored); Newnam (penalty missed); Randolph (penalty scored); Konowiecki (penalty missed); Mullin (penalty scored)	4–3	Martinez (penalty scored); Baladez (penalty scored); Morrissey (penalty missed); Troyer (penalty scored); Mangotic (penalty missed); Rafferty (penalty missed)

Stone Stadium
Columbia, South Carolina
Attendance: 1,032
Referee: Skye Arthur-Banning

November 17, 2011
19:00 ET

Furman	1–3	Charlotte
Ontiveros 19'	Report	Gentile 29'; Beaulieu 68'; Rex 84'

Transamerica Field
Charlotte, North Carolina
Attendance: 1,084
Referee: Serdar Ertep

November 17, 2011
19:00 ET

Florida Gulf Coast	0–1 (a.e.t.)	UCF
	Report	George 107'

UCF Soccer and Track Stadium
Orlando, Florida
Attendance: 535
Referee: Ted Unkel

November 17, 2011
19:00 ET

Georgia State	0–1	Duke
	Report	Tweed-Kent 53'

Koskinen Stadium
Durham, North Carolina
Attendance: 319
Referee: Daniel Fitzgerald

November 17, 2011
19:30 ET

Northwestern	1–3	Akron
O'Neill 63'	Report	Caldwell 27'; Quinn 55'; Mattocks 77'

FirstEnergy Stadium
Akron, Ohio
Attendance: 2,616
Referee: Ben Trevino

November 17, 2011
20:00 ET

Loyola Chicago	1–2	Bradley
Raymonds 31'	Report	Graf 51'; Balle 86'

Shea Stadium
Peoria, Illinois
Attendance: 740
Referee: Abbey Okulaja

November 17, 2011
22:00 ET

Saint Mary's	1–0	CSU Bakersfield
Mohoric 42'	Report

CSUB Main Soccer Field
Bakersfield, California
Attendance: 2,207
Referee: Ian Anderson

=== Second round ===
Numbers represent the seed the team earned in the tournament.

November 20, 2011
13:00 ET

Monmouth	1–2	#3 Connecticut
Jeffery 26'	Report	Diouf 39', 50' (pen.)

Morrone Stadium
Storrs, Connecticut
Attendance: 3,979
Referee: Bahij Salman

November 20, 2011
13:00 ET

Rutgers	1–1 (a.e.t.)	#4 Boston College
Kamara 87'	Report	Chin 53'
Penalties
Kamara (penalty scored); Bourdeau (penalty scored); Brown (penalty scored); Cuevas (penalty missed); Setchell (penalty scored)	4–3	Mejia (penalty scored); Aburmad (penalty missed); Fitzpatrick (penalty scored); Murphy (penalty scored); Rose (penalty missed)

Newton Soccer Complex
Boston, Massachusetts
Attendance: 886
Referee: Lou Labbadia

November 20, 2011
14:00 ET

Northern Illinois	0–3	#2 Creighton
	Report	Gomez 21'; Finlay 43', 88'

Morrison Stadium
Omaha, Nebraska
Attendance: 2,034
Referee: Jeremy Schroeder

November 20, 2011
14:00 ET

Old Dominion	0–3	#16 Indiana
	Report	Kotlov 17', 71'; Wylie 80'

Bill Armstrong Stadium
Bloomington, Indiana
Attendance: 701
Referee: Landis Wiley

November 20, 2011
17:00 ET

Coastal Carolina	2–3	#1 North Carolina
Bennett 41'; East 52'	Report	Speas 50'; Urso 52'; Martínez 69'

Fetzer Field
Chapel Hill, North Carolina
Attendance: 1,054
Referee: Daniel Fitzgerald

November 20, 2011
17:00 ET

West Virginia	0–4	#5 Maryland
	Report	Townsend 20', 60', 76'; Cyrus 61'

Ludwig Field
College Park, Maryland
Attendance: 2,437
Referee: Mark Kadleck

November 20, 2011
17:00 ET

Brown	1–0	#9 St. John's
Remick 48'	Report

Belson Stadium
Queens, New York
Attendance: 1,027
Referee: Kenneth Henriques

November 20, 2011
17:00 ET

Wake Forest	0–2	#14 James Madison
	Report	J. Simpson 14'; McLaughlin 32'

JMU Lacrosse/Soccer Complex
Harrisonburg, Virginia
Attendance: 776
Referee: Christopher Spivey

November 20, 2011
18:00 ET

UCF	1–2 (a.e.t.)	#7 South Florida
Hunt 72'	Report	70' (o.g.); Charpie 96'

Corbett Stadium
Tampa, Florida
Attendance: 3,029
Referee: Andres Pferrerkorn

November 20, 2011
19:00 ET

Bradley	2–3 (a.e.t.)	#12 Louisville
Davis 55'; Gaul 90'	Report	Rolfe 87'; Walker 87'; DeLeon 108'

Cardinal Park Soccer and Track Stadium
Louisville, Kentucky
Attendance: 7,012
Referee: Khalaf Al-Latayfeh

November 20, 2011
20:00 ET

Akron	3–2	#6 SMU
Mattocks 22', 76'; Holmes 63'	Report	Engel 83'; Ivo 83' (pen.)

Westcott Field
University Park, Texas
Attendance: 890
Referee: Misail Tsapos

November 20, 2011
20:00 ET

Charlotte	3–1	#11 UAB
James 1'; Rex 47'; Beaulieu 50'	Report	Wickham 51'

West Campus Field
Birmingham, Alabama
Attendance: 2,214
Referee: Alex Prus

November 20, 2011
20:30 ET

Providence	2–3	#15 UC Santa Barbara
Adler 68'; Baumann 83' (pen.)	Report	Silva 6'; Madueno 41'; Sarle 72'

Harder Stadium
Santa Barbara, California
Attendance: 1,311
Referee: Martik Mirikian

November 20, 2011
21:00 ET

Saint Mary's	2–1 (a.e.t.)	#8 UC Irvine
Hanley 58'; Howard 103'	Report	Ibarra 84'

Anteater Stadium
Irvine, California
Attendance: 657
Referee: Frank Anderson

November 20, 2011
21:00 ET

Duke	1–2 (a.e.t.)	#10 New Mexico
Palodichuk 52'	Report	Smith 82'; Baldinger 99'

Lobo Soccer/Track Complex
Albuquerque, New Mexico
Attendance: 6,200
Referee: Mohamed Ibrahim

November 20, 2011
22:00 ET

Delaware	0–1	#13 UCLA
	Report	Hoffman 84'

Drake Stadium
Los Angeles
Attendance: 381
Referee: Mohamed Mahmoud

=== Third round ===
November 27, 2011
13:00 ET

#16 Indiana	0–1 (a.e.t.)	#1 North Carolina
	Report	Schuler 97'

Fetzer Field
Chapel Hill, North Carolina
Attendance: 1,504
Referee: Bill Ditmer

November 27, 2011
13:00 ET

#14 James Madison	0–3	#3 Connecticut
	Report	Alvarez 19'; Diouf 63'; Cascio 65'

Morrone Stadium
Storrs, Connecticut
Attendance: 4,983
Referee: Peter Dhima

November 27, 2011
14:00 ET

#15 UC Santa Barbara	1–2	#2 Creighton
Opoku 79'	Report	Castro 8' (pen.); Ribeiro 19'

Morrison Stadium
Omaha, Nebraska
Attendance: 2,436
Referee: Hilario Grajeda

November 27, 2011
17:00 ET

#12 Louisville	4–2	#5 Maryland
DeLeon 19'; Rolfe 52'; Keller 79'; Roman 84'	Report	Townsend 34'; Oduaran 68'

Ludwig Field
College Park, Maryland
Attendance: 2,660
Referee: Andrew Chapin

November 27, 2011
17:00 ET

Saint Mary's	3–2 (a.e.t.)	Brown
Newquist 29' 98'; Mohoric 64'	Report	Remick 51'; Rosa 62'

Stevenson Field
Providence, Rhode Island
Attendance: 1,330
Referee: Alex Prus

November 27, 2011
18:00 ET

#10 New Mexico	0–0 (a.e.t.)	#7 South Florida
	Report
Penalties
Rozeboom (penalty scored); Green (penalty scored); Smith (penalty missed); Sandoval (penalty scored); Venter (penalty scored); Gibbons (penalty scored); Baldinger (penalty missed)	5–6	Baldin (penalty scored); Perry (penalty scored); Dwyer (penalty missed); Fairclough (penalty scored); Paul (penalty scored); Olali (penalty scored); Alexis (penalty scored)

Corbett Stadium
Tampa, Florida
Attendance: 3,592
Referee: Chris Penso

November 27, 2011
19:00 ET

Akron	0–1	Charlotte
	Report	Gentile 25'

Transamerica Field
Charlotte, North Carolina
Attendance: 2,182
Referee: Mark Kadlecik

November 27, 2011
20:00 ET

Rutgers	0–3	#13 UCLA
	Report	Hoffman 1', 49'; Chavez 44'

Drake Stadium
Los Angeles
Attendance: 749
Referee: Alex Gorin

=== Quarterfinals ===
December 3, 2011
17:00 ET

Saint Mary's	0–2	#1 North Carolina
	Report	Hedges 53'; Speas 65'

Fetzer Field
Chapel Hill, North Carolina
Attendance: 5,810
Referee: Chico Grajeda

December 3, 2011
19:00 ET

#13 UCLA	1–0 (a.e.t.)	#12 Louisville
Williams 102'	Report

Cardinal Park Soccer and Track Stadium
Louisville, Kentucky
Attendance: 4,832
Referee: Lou Labbadia

December 4, 2011
13:00 ET

Charlotte	1–1 (a.e.t.)	#3 Connecticut
Gentile 85'	Report	Cascio 82'
Penalties
Gibson (penalty scored); James (penalty missed); Smith (penalty scored); Cowles (penalty scored); Rodriguez (penalty scored)	4–2	Diouf (penalty missed); Mercado (penalty missed); Alvarez (penalty scored); Bradley (penalty scored)

Morrone Stadium
Storrs, Connecticut
Attendance: 5,100
Referee: Misail Tsapos

December 4, 2011
14:00 ET

#7 South Florida	0–1 (a.e.t.)	#2 Creighton
	Report	Finlay 97'

Morrison Stadium
Omaha, Nebraska
Attendance: 2,341
Referee: Edvin Jurisevic

=== College Cup: Semifinals ===
December 9, 2011
18:00 ET

Charlotte	0–0 (a.e.t.)	#2 Creighton
	Report
Penalties
Gibson (penalty scored); Caughran (penalty scored); Smith (penalty scored); Cowles (penalty scored)	4–1	Castro (penalty scored); Clark (penalty missed); Finlay (penalty missed)

Regions Park
Hoover, Alabama
Attendance: 9,623
Referee: Hilario Grajeda

December 9, 2011
20:30 ET

#1 North Carolina	2–2 (a.e.t.)	#13 UCLA
Lovejoy 56'; Schuler 85'	Report	Hollingshead 17'; K. Rowe 74'
Penalties
Urso (penalty scored); McKinney (penalty scored); Schuler (penalty missed); Speas (penalty scored)	3–1	Rose (penalty missed); K. Rowe (penalty missed); Muñoz (penalty scored); Monge (penalty missed)

Regions Park
Hoover, Alabama
Attendance: 9,623
Referee: Alex Prus

=== College Cup: Final ===
December 11, 2011
16:00 ET

Charlotte	0–1	#1 North Carolina
	Report	Speas 65'

Regions Park
Hoover, Alabama
Attendance: 8,777
Referee: Michael Kennedy

== Statistics ==
=== Top goalscorers ===
4 goals

- (United States) Casey Townsend – Maryland

3 goals

- (Jamaica) Darren Mattocks – Akron
- (United States) Giuseppe Gentile – Charlotte
- (Senegal) Mamadou Diouf – Connecticut
- (United States) Ethan Finlay – Creighton
- (United States) Ben Speas – North Carolina
- (United States) Chandler Hoffman – UCLA

2 goals

- (United States) Dylan Remick – Brown
- (Canada) Sean Rosa – Brown
- (United States) T. J. Beaulieu – Charlotte
- (United States) Jennings Rex – Charlotte
- (Jamaica) Ashton Bennett – Coastal Carolina
- (United States) Teejay East – Coastal Carolina
- (United States) Tony Cascio – Connecticut
- (United States) Chris Thomas – Elon
- (United States) Nikita Kotlov – Indiana
- (United States) Nick DeLeon – Louisville
- (United States) Colin Rolfe – Louisville
- (United States) Billy Schuler – North Carolina
- (United States) Tom Mohoric – Saint Mary's
- (United States) Trevor Newquist – Saint Mary's

1 goal

- (United States) Scott Caldwell – Akron
- (England) Luke Holmes – Akron
- (United States) Aodhan Quinn – Akron
- (United States) Patrick Chin – Boston College
- (United States) Keegan Balle – Bradley
- (United States) Scott Davis – Bradley
- (United States) Bryan Gaul – Bradley
- (United States) Jochen Graf – Bradley
- (United States) Aidan Leonard – Brown
- (United States) T. J. Popolizio – Brown
- (Canada) Evan James – Charlotte
- (Costa Rica) Ricky Garbanzo – Coastal Carolina
- (Cameroon) Cyprian Hedrick – Coastal Carolina
- (United States) Steven Miller – Colgate
- (United States) Matt Schuber – Colgate
- (United States) Carlos Alvarez – Connecticut
- (Costa Rica) Bruno Castro – Creighton
- (United States) Jose Gomez – Creighton
- (United States) Andrew Ribeiro – Creighton
- (Republic of Ireland) John Dineen – Delaware
- (United States) Nick Palodichuk – Duke
- (United States) Chris Tweed-Kent – Duke
- (United States) James Carroll – Elon
- (England) Daniel Shaw – Fairfield
- (United States) Jake Zuniga – Fairfield
- (United States) Martin Ontiveros – Furman
- (United States) Tim Wylie – Indiana
- (United States) Christian McLaughlin – James Madison
- (United States) Jimmy Simpson – James Madison
- (United States) Daniel Keller – Louisville
- (United States) Michael Roman – Louisville
- (United States) Kenney Walker – Louisville
- (United States) Andrew Raymonds – Loyola-Chicago
- (United States) Jordan Cyrus – Maryland
- (United States) Matt Oduaran – Maryland
- (United States) Matt Jeffery – Monmouth
- (United States) Carson Baldinger – New Mexico
- (United States) Blake Smith – New Mexico
- (United States) Matt Hedges – North Carolina
- (United States) Rob Lovejoy – North Carolina
- (Uruguay) Enzo Martínez – North Carolina
- (United States) Kirk Urso – North Carolina
- (United States) Isaac Kannah – Northern Illinois
- (United States) Mike Mascitti – Northern Illinois
- (United States) Sean Totsch – Northern Illinois
- (United States) Peter O'Neill – Northwestern
- (United States) Brandon Adler – Providence
- (United States) Anthony Baumann – Providence
- (United States) John Raley – Providence
- (United States) Nate Bourdeau – Rutgers
- (United States) Juan Pablo Correa – Rutgers
- (United States) Ibrahim Kamara – Rutgers
- (United States) Bryant Knibbs – Rutgers
- (United States) Riley Hanley – Saint Mary's
- (United States) Justin Howard – Saint Mary's
- (United States) Tyler Engel – SMU
- (Brazil) Arthur Ivo – SMU
- (United States) Chipper Root – South Carolina
- (United States) Wesley Charpie – South Florida
- (Canada) Chase Wickham – UAB
- (United States) Miguel Ibarra – UC Irvine
- (United States) Josue Madueno – UC Santa Barbara
- (Ghana) David Opoku – UC Santa Barbara
- (United States) Dom Sarle – UC Santa Barbara
- (United States) Luis Silva – UC Santa Barbara
- (Trinidad and Tobago) Kevan George – UCF
- (New Zealand) Ben Hunt – UCF
- (United States) Víctor Chavez – UCLA
- (United States) Ryan Hollingshead – UCLA
- (United States) Kelyn Rowe – UCLA
- (United States) Reed Williams – UCLA
- (United States) Ross Tomaselli – Wake Forest
- (United States) Eric Schoenle – West Virginia
- (United States) Jay Williams – West Virginia
- (United States) Gino Depaoli – Xavier

Own goals

- Colgate (playing against Rutgers)
- UCF (playing against South Florida)

== See also ==
- NCAA Men's Soccer Championship
- 2011 NCAA Division I men's soccer season
