= 2011 Charlotte 49ers men's soccer team =

Charlotte 49ers
2011 season
- Athletic Director: (United States) Judy Rose
- Head Coach: (England) Jeremy Gunn
- A-10 Regular Season: 1st
- A-10 Tournament: Quarter-finals
- NCAA Tournament: Final
| Home colors | Away colors |

The 2011 Charlotte 49ers men's soccer team represented the University of North Carolina at Charlotte during the 2011 NCAA Division I men's soccer season.

The team reached the NCAA final, being the first team in the 49ers program history to reach a national championship. They ultimately lost to their sister university, UNC Chapel Hill 1–0 in the final.

== Competitions ==
Home team is listed on the right, and the away team is listed on the left.

=== Exhibitions ===
| August 17, 2011 Preseason 1 | #23 Charlotte | 2 – 0 | Winthrop | Rock Hill, South Carolina |
| 17:00 EDT | Gentile 55'; James 74' | Report | | Stadium: Eagle Field; Attendance: Not reported |

| August 21, 2011 Preseason 2 | #3 North Carolina | 2 – 1 | #23 Charlotte | Charlotte, North Carolina |
| 17:00 EDT | Speas 21'; Schuler 41' | Report | Beaulieu 14' | Stadium: Transamerica Field; Attendance: 4,038 |
Note: Match was suspended in the 70th minute due to inclement weather.

=== Regular season ===
==== Atlantic 10 standings ====
Atlantic 10
| Team | Conf. (W–L–T) | Ovrl. (W–L–T) |
|---|---|---|
| Charlotte | 0–0–0 | 0–0–0 |
| Dayton | 0–0–0 | 0–0–0 |
| Duquesne | 0–0–0 | 0–0–0 |
| Fordham | 0–0–0 | 0–0–0 |
| George Washington | 0–0–0 | 0–0–0 |
| La Salle | 0–0–0 | 0–0–0 |
| Massachusetts | 0–0–0 | 0–0–0 |
| Rhode Island | 0–0–0 | 0–0–0 |
| St. Joseph's | 0–0–0 | 0–0–0 |
| St. Louis | 0–0–0 | 0–0–0 |
| St. Bonaventure | 0–0–0 | 0–0–0 |
| Temple | 0–0–0 | 0–0–0 |
| Xavier | 0–0–0 | 0–0–0 |

==== Results summary ====
| Overall | | | | | | | | Home | | | | | | Away | | | | | |
| Pld | W | D | L | GF | GA | GD | Pts | W | D | L | GF | GA | GD | W | D | L | GF | GA | GD |
|---|---|---|---|---|---|---|---|---|---|---|---|---|---|---|---|---|---|---|---|
| 18 | 13 | 2 | 3 | 32 | 15 | +17 | 41 | 7 | 0 | 0 | 13 | 1 | +12 | 6 | 2 | 3 | 19 | 14 | +5 |

Last updated: December 11, 2011.
Source: Game reports

==== Results by round ====
| Round | 1 | 2 | 3 | 4 | 5 | 6 | 7 | 8 | 9 | 10 | 11 | 12 | 13 | 14 | 15 | 16 | 17 | 18 |
|---|---|---|---|---|---|---|---|---|---|---|---|---|---|---|---|---|---|---|
| Ground | A | H | A | H | H | A | A | H | A | A | A | H | H | A | A | H | H | A |
| Result | W | W | L | W | W | W | W | W | L | W | T | W | W | T | L | W | W | W |

Updated to match(es) played on December 11, 2011. Source: Game reports
A = Away; H = Home; W = Win; L = Loss; T = Tie

==== Game reports ====
| August 29, 2011 1 | #23 Charlotte | 2 – 1 | Coastal Carolina | Conway, South Carolina |
| 19:00 EDT |

| September 4, 2011 2 | UNC Wilmington | 0 – 2 | Charlotte | Charlotte, North Carolina |
| 19:00 EDT | | | | Stadium: Transamerica Field |

| September 6, 2011 3 | #17 Charlotte | 1 – 2 | South Carolina | Columbia, South Carolina |
| 19:00 EDT |

| September 9, 2011 4 | #17 Charlotte | 3 – 0 | Elon | Elon, North Carolina |
| 19:00 EDT |

| September 11, 2011 5 | #27 UNC Greensboro | 0 – 1 | #17 Charlotte | Charlotte, North Carolina |
| 19:00 EDT | | | | Stadium: Transamerica Field |

| September 16, 2011 6 | #19 Charlotte | 2 – 1 (a.e.t.) | #12 Virginia | Charlottesville, Virginia |
| 19:00 EDT | Kirkbride (yellow card) 34'; Gibson (yellow card) 62' (goal) 90'; Cowles (yellow card) 71'; Smith (yellow card) 72'; Cowles (red card) 74'; Caughran 92' | Report | Bird (yellow card) 39'; Bates (yellow card) 55' (goal) 71' (pen.); Somerville (yellow card) 62'; Silverster (yellow card) 78'; Volk (red card) 81'; Jumper (yellow card) 87' (red card) 90' | Stadium: Klöckner Stadium; Attendance: 2,135; Referee: Jeffrey Gontarek |

| September 20, 2011 7 | #14 Charlotte | 3 – 1 | Clemson | Clemson, South Carolina |
| 19:00 EDT |

| September 24, 2011 8 | Campbell | 0 – 2 | #14 Charlotte | Charlotte, North Carolina |
| 19:00 EDT | | | | Stadium: Transamerica Field |

| September 27, 2011 9 | #12 Charlotte | 1 – 3 | #3 Maryland | College Park, Maryland |
| 19:30 EDT | | | | Stadium: Ludwig Field |

| October 7, 2011 10 | #14 Charlotte | 2 – 1 (a.e.t.) | UMass | Amherst, Massachusetts |
| 15:30 EDT |
Note: Atlantic 10 Conference match

| August 26, 2011 11 | St. Bonaventure | 1 – 1 (a.e.t.) | Rhode Island | Providence, Rhode Island |
| 13:00 EDT |
Note: Atlantic 10 Conference match

| October 14, 2011 12 | St. Bonaventure | 1 – 5 | Charlotte | Charlotte, North Carolina |
| 19:00 EDT | | | | Stadium: Transamerica Field |

| October 16, 2011 13 | Duquesne | 0 – 1 | Charlotte | Charlotte, North Carolina |
| 13:00 EDT | | | | Stadium: Transamerica Field |

| October 21, 2011 14 | #10 Charlotte | 2 – 2 (a.e.t.) | La Salle |
| 19:00 EDT |

| October 23, 2011 15 | #10 Charlotte | 0 – 1 | Fordham |
| 13:00 EDT |

| October 28, 2011 16 | Xavier | 0 – 1 (a.e.t.) | #16 Charlotte | Charlotte, North Carolina |
| 19:00 EDT | | | | Stadium: Transamerica Field |

| October 30, 2011 17 | Dayton | 0 – 1 | Charlotte | Charlotte, North Carolina |
| 19:00 EDT | | | | Stadium: Transamerica Field |

| November 5, 2011 18 | #11 Charlotte | 2 – 1 (a.e.t.) | Saint Louis | St. Louis, Missouri |
| 20:00 EDT |

=== A-10 Tournament ===
| November 10, 2011 QF | Xavier | 2 – 1 (a.e.t.) | #8 Charlotte | St. Louis, Missouri |
| 18:00 EDT |

=== NCAA Tournament ===
| November 17, 2011 R1 | Furman | 1 – 3 | Charlotte | Charlotte, North Carolina |
| 19:00 EDT | Ontiveros 19' | Report | Gentile 29' (yellow card) 63'; Kirkbride (yellow card) 57'; Rodriguez (yellow card) 62'; Beaulieu 68'; Rex 84' | Stadium: Transamerica Field; Attendance: 1,084; Referee: Serdar Ertep |

| November 20, 2011 R2 | Charlotte | 3 – 1 | #11 UAB | Birmingham, Alabama |
| 19:00 EDT | James 1'; Rex 47'; Caughran (yellow card) 49'; Beaulieu 50' | Report | Wickham 51' | Stadium: West Campus Field; Attendance: 2,214 (SO); Referee: Alex Prus |

| November 27, 2011 R3 | #10 Akron | 0 – 1 | #14 Charlotte | Charlotte, North Carolina |
| 19:00 EDT | Trapp (yellow card) 9'; Yedlin (yellow card) 80' | Report | Kirkbride (yellow card) 6'; Thomas (yellow card) 12'; Gentile 25' (yellow card) 58'; Cowles (yellow card) 41'; Smith (yellow card) 66' | Stadium: Transamerica Field; Attendance: 2,182; Referee: Alex Prus |

| November 30, 2011 QF | #14 Charlotte | 1 – 1 (a.e.t.) (4 – 2 p) | #5 Connecticut | Storrs, Connecticut |
| 13:00 EDT | Gentile 85' | Report | Cascio 82' | Stadium: Morrone Stadium; Attendance: 5,100; Referee: Alex Prus |
| | Penalties |
| | Gibson (penalty scored); James (penalty missed); Smith (penalty scored); Cowles (penalty scored); Rodriguez (penalty scored) | | Diouf (penalty missed); Mercado (penalty missed); Alvarez (penalty scored); Bradley (penalty scored) |

==== College Cup ====
| December 9, 2011 SF | #14 Charlotte | 0 – 0 (a.e.t.) (4 – 1 p) | #2 Creighton | Hoover, Alabama |
| 18:00 EDT | Trapp (yellow card) 9'; Yedlin (yellow card) 80' | Report | Kirkbride (yellow card) 6'; Thomas (yellow card) 12'; Gentile 25' (yellow card) 58'; Cowles (yellow card) 41'; Smith (yellow card) 66' | Stadium: Regions Park; Attendance: 9,623; Referee: Chico Grajeda |
| | Penalties |
| | Gibson (penalty scored); Caughran (penalty scored); Smith (penalty scored); Cowles (penalty scored) | | Castro (penalty scored); Clark (penalty missed); Finlay (penalty missed) |

| December 11, 2011 F | #14 Charlotte | 0 – 1 | #1 North Carolina | Hoover, Alabama |
| 12:00 EDT | Smith (yellow card) 78' | Report | Speas 65' | Stadium: Regions Park; Attendance: 10,000; Referee: Michael Kennedy |
