= Kirk Urso =

American soccer player (1990–2012)

- Urso with Columbus Crew in 2012

Personal information
- Full name: Kirk Jon Urso
- Date of birth: March 6, 1990
- Place of birth: Downers Grove, Illinois, U.S.
- Date of death: August 5, 2012 (aged 22)
- Place of death: Columbus, Ohio, U.S.
- Height: 5 ft 11 in (1.80 m)
- Position: Midfielder

Youth career
- 1997–2005: Chicago Sockers

College career
Years	Team	Apps	(Gls)
2008–2011	North Carolina Tar Heels	91	(15)

Senior career*
Years	Team	Apps	(Gls)
2008–2009	Carolina Dynamo	25	(4)
2010	Chicago Fire Premier	16	(5)
2012	Columbus Crew	6	(0)
Total		47	(9)

International career
2007	United States U17	2	(1)
2008	United States U20		
- * Club domestic league appearances and goals

Kirk Jon Urso (March 6, 1990 – August 5, 2012) was an American professional soccer player who played as a midfielder. A product of Glenbard East High School and the IMG Soccer Academy, Urso played four years of college soccer at North Carolina. He helped the Tar Heels win three Atlantic Coast Conference titles, reach four consecutive College Cups, and claim a national championship in 2011. Upon his graduation, Urso's 91 appearances for North Carolina were the most in program history.

Urso appeared during the collegiate offseason with Carolina Dynamo and Chicago Fire Premier. He was selected by Columbus Crew in the first round of the 2012 MLS Supplemental Draft and went on to appear in six matches for the Crew. At international level, Urso appeared for the United States at under-17 and under-20 level after coming up through various boys' national teams. He appeared for the U17s at the 2007 FIFA U-17 World Cup and was with the U20s at the 2008 Milk Cup.

Urso died at the Grant Medical Center in August 2012, from arrhythmogenic right ventricular cardiomyopathy, an inherited heart disease caused by genetic defects of the parts of heart muscle. The student section at North Carolina's UNC Soccer and Lacrosse Stadium is named after Urso, and both the Tar Heels and Crew give out the annual Kirk Urso Heart Award in his honor. The Kirk Urso Memorial Fund was also created in his memory, to advance research and programming on congenital heart defects.

== Early life ==
Urso was born in Downers Grove, Illinois, the younger of two sons to his parents Michael and Sandra Urso. He attended Glenbard East High School and played in the Illinois Olympic Development Program (ODP) as a freshman before spending two years in the under-17 national team residency program at the IMG Soccer Academy. He was named to the 2006 NSCAA/adidas Youth All-America Team and the 2007 Parade High School All-America squad.

At club level, Urso spent eight years in the Chicago Sockers youth setup before joining the residency program; with the Sockers, he played alongside Michael Bradley, David Meves, Greg Jordan, and Andy Rose. Urso committed to play college soccer for head coach Elmar Bolowich at the University of North Carolina, part of a recruiting class that also included Jordan Gafa, Billy Schuler, and Sheanon Williams.

== College and amateur ==
After enrolling a semester early and training with North Carolina during the spring of 2008, Urso made his collegiate debut for the Tar Heels on August 29, 2008; he started and provided an assist in a 3–0 victory against Florida International as part of the Carolina Nike Classic. His first goal for North Carolina came slightly more than a week later, helping the Tar Heels earn a 1–1 draw against nationally ranked UCLA on September 7. Urso missed the ACC Men's Soccer Tournament and the second round of the NCAA tournament due to a stress fracture in his shin, but returned in the third round against UIC and scored North Carolina's first goal in a 3–2 victory; he also scored the only goal of a 1–0 win over Northwestern that sent Carolina to the College Cup. Although the Tar Heels lost to Maryland in the national championship game, Urso was named as a Soccer America Second Team Freshman All-American after tallying three goals and six assists in 19 appearances.

As a sophomore, Urso tallied four goals and led the Tar Heels with six assists in 22 matches. He scored twice in the season opener against UNC Asheville, helping North Carolina to a 5–0 victory. He helped the Tar Heels claim a share of the Atlantic Coast Conference (ACC) regular season title, then scored a goal in the NCAA Tournament for the second straight season; his strike helped North Carolina defeat Drake and secure a spot in the College Cup. Following the season, Urso was honored with the Tar Heels' Nicholas Douglass Potter Coaches Award. His best statistical season came as a junior, when Urso notched five goals and five assists in 24 appearances on his way to being named All-ACC Second Team; he also earned a spot on the ACC All-Tournament Team. He twice tallied game-winning goals, coming through an overtime free kick against Wofford and directly off a corner kick against Virginia. For a third consecutive season, Urso scored in the NCAA Tournament; this time, he tallied in regulation and scored during the penalty shootout as North Carolina advanced to the College Cup by defeating SMU.

Urso was named as the team captain for his senior season; he was the only player remaining on the roster who had played in each of North Carolina's previous three trips to the College Cup. During the 2011 season, the Tar Heels claimed the ACC regular season and tournament titles with Urso chipping in two goals and six assists. He added a goal and an assist in the NCAA Tournament, scoring in the second round against Coastal Carolina as North Carolina returned to the College Cup for the fourth year running. In the College Cup semifinals against UCLA, he scored in the penalty shootout; he then played the entire national championship game as North Carolina claimed the national title with a 1–0 victory over Charlotte. Urso finished his collegiate career with 15 goals and 24 assists in 91 appearances; he played more games than any player in Tar Heel history. Following his senior season, Urso was invited to the 2012 MLS Combine.

=== Carolina Dynamo ===
Urso spent the 2008 and 2009 Premier Development League (PDL) seasons with Carolina Dynamo, appearing for the Dynamo ahead of his freshman and sophomore years at North Carolina. In his first season with the Dynamo, he provided a goal and an assist in 15 appearances; he then added three goals and an assist during the 2009 regular season to help Carolina qualify for the PDL playoffs. Urso played the full 90 minutes in the first round of the divisional playoffs, but the Dynamo fell to Cary Clarets by a 3–1 scoreline. In total, he played 26 matches and scored four goals during his time with the Dynamo.

=== Chicago Fire Premier ===
Ahead of his junior collegiate season, Urso moved within the PDL and joined Chicago Fire Premier, the affiliate club of Major League Soccer's Chicago Fire. He spent just one season with Fire Premier, scoring five goals and providing four assists in 16 appearances. Urso scored twice in a 5–0 victory over Kalamazoo Outrage in early June, then scored on a free kick in a 2–1 defeat against Michigan Bucks in mid-July. Although he had played for the Fire's PDL affiliate, Urso was not eligible to sign with the club as a homegrown player since he did not meet league requirements.

== Club career ==
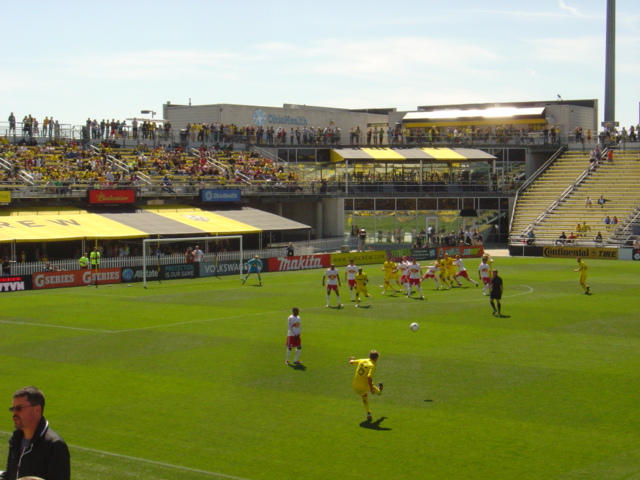
Urso (foreground) takes a free kick against New York Red Bulls.

Out of college, Urso was selected with the 10th overall pick of the 2012 MLS Supplemental Draft by Columbus Crew; he joined North Carolina teammate Ben Speas in Columbus after Speas had signed with the club as a homegrown player a week earlier. After taking part in preseason with the Crew, Urso signed with the club on March 1, 2012. With starting defensive midfielder Danny O'Rourke sidelined by injury to begin the season, Urso made his club and professional debut in the season opener against Colorado Rapids on March 10. He played the full 90 minutes in a 2–0 defeat for Columbus.

Urso tallied his first point for the Crew in just his fourth match, albeit in a 4–1 defeat against New York Red Bulls on April 7. His corner kick in the 89th minute was headed home by club captain Chad Marshall, briefly cutting the Columbus deficit to 3–1. Urso started each of Columbus' first five games, but dropped out of the lineup following O'Rourke's return. He made his sixth and final appearance for the Crew as a substitute against Vancouver Whitecaps FC on April 28. Urso missed the month of May after suffering a groin injury, then underwent surgery in June for what was confirmed to be right adductor tendonitis.

The day before Urso's death, the Crew had suffered a 1–0 defeat on the road against D.C. United. Due to his injury, Urso had not traveled with the team to Washington, D.C. but had instead remained behind in Columbus.

== International career ==
After rising through the ranks with the United States under-15 and under-16 national teams, Urso was admitted to the under-17 national team residency program at the IMG Soccer Academy in 2005. From there, he was named as part of the American roster for the 2007 FIFA U-17 World Cup, held in South Korea. In the Americans' final group stage game, against Belgium, Urso scored the match-winning goal in the 63rd minute, helping the United States place second in their group and advance to the knockout stages. He was later called up by the under-20s for the 2008 Milk Cup and for a training camp in December of that year.

== Personal life ==
Urso supported English club Arsenal. He played basketball as a child before committing to soccer full-time and was a fan of the Chicago Bulls. He majored in economics while at North Carolina. Prior to college, Urso had trained with Spanish club Real Madrid. While in school, he spent a semester in Europe training with Bolton Wanderers and Borussia Dortmund.

Urso's older brother, Kyle, played college soccer at New Hampshire and in the National Premier Soccer League with Seacoast United Phantoms.

== Death and legacy ==
"He was always someone who would come shake your hand, come search you out, somebody that coaches just loved to work with. You could be hard on him, but he would want you to, he would thank you for it."

— Dave Richardson, Chicago Sockers president, following Urso's death

Early in the morning on August 5, 2012, Urso collapsed and fell unconscious at a bar in Columbus. He was taken by police officers to nearby Grant Medical Center, where he was pronounced dead at 1:51 a.m. local time at the age of 22. Autopsy results revealed that Urso died from arrhythmogenic right ventricular cardiomyopathy, a preexisting heart condition that he "likely did not know he had", according to the Franklin County coroner. In the immediate wake of Urso's death, tributes poured in on social media from his North Carolina and Crew teammates, fellow Major League Soccer rookies, and other members of the American soccer community.

The Crew announced that Urso's number 15 jersey would hang in the locker room at Columbus Crew Stadium and that memorial patches would be worn on the club's jerseys for the remainder of the 2012 season; a plaque and oak tree were dedicated to Urso outside the stadium in October. Crew supporters in the Nordecke honored Urso with banners and Major League Soccer held a moment of silence before league matches on August 5. Black armbands with Urso's name and number on them were worn by some clubs, including LA Galaxy. Some former teammates, including Stephen McCarthy and Rob Lovejoy, would later change their kit numbers to honor Urso.

On March 24, 2013, Columbus played their first game at D.C. United since learning of Urso's death while the club was in Washington, D.C. The Crew claimed a 2–1 victory in that game, with the winning goal being scored by Urso's college teammate Ben Speas; it marked Speas' first professional goal. He dedicated the goal to Urso, saying "This is the place we found out about Kirk, so it was pretty emotional. I thought about that yesterday and I knew my first goal was going to be to him and I wanted to get it today. It's just special.”

=== Kirk Urso Memorial Fund ===
"He always was going to work hard on his game even though he knew maybe he wasn't the most athletic guy, not the most creative guy. ‘I will find a way to get on the field. I will do other things better than the next guy in front of me and I will ultimately get on' and that was really his mentality."

— Ethan Finlay, teammate and roommate of Urso in Columbus

The Crew Soccer Foundation created the Kirk Urso Memorial Fund in October 2012, to honor Urso's memory and advance research and programming on congenital heart defects. The fund raised more than $100,000 in its first year, partially through an initiative started by retired defender Eddie Pope that saw players' fines from the 2012 season donated to the fund. In October 2013, United States national team striker Jozy Altidore wore a customized pair of cleats for a World Cup qualifier against Jamaica; a quote from Urso and both players' initials and numbers were featured on the cleats. They were raffled off during the game, with proceeds going to the Urso Memorial Fund.

Former Crew athletic trainer Dave Lagow ran the 2018 Marine Corps Marathon in memory of Urso; he started a GoFundMe campaign to raise money for the fund. Lagow opened the campaign a month before the race with a goal of $1,500, reflecting Urso's number with the Crew, but later changed the goal to $3,000 to reflect his number at North Carolina. During the 2019 season, Crew fans began offering free tickets to home matches in exchange for a donation to the Urso Memorial Fund.

=== Later memorials ===
Both North Carolina and Columbus created a Kirk Urso Heart Award, although the inspiration behind the award was different for each team. The North Carolina award was given to "the most competitive player" on the team; senior midfielder Jordan Gafa was the first winner of that award following the 2012 season. For the Crew, the award was given to the "player who best exemplifies Urso's leadership characteristics." Urso was posthumously announced as the first winner of the award, with defender Eric Gehrig earning the honor in 2013. In subsequent years, the award would be given to "the player that best exemplified the qualities in a teammate and became 'the heart' in the club's locker room."

Beginning in 2013, North Carolina men's soccer started the Kirk Urso Memorial Match to contribute to the memorial fund. The inaugural edition featured the Tar Heels and Crew facing off, and in future years was held as a tournament between college soccer programs in North Carolina.

Upon completion of the UNC Soccer and Lacrosse Stadium, which replaced Fetzer Field ahead of the Tar Heels' 2019 season, sections three and four were unveiled as the Kirk Urso Student Section. Rob Lovejoy, who had played alongside Urso for two seasons at North Carolina, spearheaded an effort through the Rams Club to raise $50,000: to help offset the cost of building the stadium and to name the student section in Urso's honor. The section was dedicated at halftime of an August 30 game against Creighton; Urso's number three jersey was also informally retired by the Tar Heels.

== Career statistics ==
Appearances and goals by club, season and competition
Club	Season	League			Cup		Other		Total	
Club	Season	Division	Apps	Goals	Apps	Goals	Apps	Goals	Apps	Goals
Carolina Dynamo	2008	PDL	15	1	—		—		15	1
Carolina Dynamo	2009	PDL	10	3	—		1 (Note: Appearance in the PDL playoffs)	0	11	3
Carolina Dynamo	Total		25	4	0	0	1	0	26	4
Chicago Fire Premier	2010	PDL	16	5	—		—		16	5
Columbus Crew	2012	MLS	6	0	0	0	—		6	0
Career total			47	9	0	0	1	0	48	9

== Honors ==
North Carolina Tar Heels

- Atlantic Coast Conference (regular season): 2009, 2011
- ACC Men's Soccer Tournament: 2011
- College Cup: 2011

Individual

- NSCAA/adidas Youth All-America: 2006
- Parade High School All-America: 2007
- Soccer America Second Team Freshman All-America: 2008
- ACC All-Tournament Team: 2010
- All-ACC Second Team: 2010, 2011
- Kirk Urso Heart Award: 2012
