= Carlos Somoano =

American soccer coach

Personal information
- Place of birth: Houston, Texas, United States

College career
Years	Team	Apps	(Gls)
–1992	Eckerd Tritons		

Managerial career
- 1992–1995: Eckerd Tritons (assistant)
- 1996–2001: VCU Rams (assistant)
- 2002–2010: North Carolina Tar Heels (assistant)
- 2011–: North Carolina Tar Heels

Carlos Somoano is an American soccer coach and is currently the head coach of the University of North Carolina men's soccer team. In his first season in charge of the Tar Heels, he led the team to the NCAA championship, becoming the second rookie head coach in NCAA history to do so after Mike Freitag.

== Education ==
Somoano received a Bachelor of Science in biology (concentration in pre-medicine) from Eckerd College in 1992. He also earned four letters in soccer and was a two-year team captain. In 2000, he earned a Master's in Sport Management degree from the University of Richmond.

== Coaching career ==
In 1992, he started his career as an assistant coach at his alma mater, Eckard College, and there he spent four seasons. In 1996, he moved to Virginia Commonwealth University in an assistant role, serving under Tim Sullivan. After spending six seasons at the Rams, he again took up an assistant role, this time under Elmar Bolowich, at the University of North Carolina.

Somoano helped recruit six top-10 recruiting classes and watched over one of the most successful periods in school history as an assistant coach for nine seasons from 2002 to 2010. The Tar Heels advanced to three consecutive NCAA College Cups, including the 2008 National Championship game, and amassed a 118–52–27 record. He helped lead the Tar Heels to nine All-America honors and 41 All-Atlantic Coast Conference honors as an assistant including the 2003 ACC Rookie of the Year, Jamie Watson.

On 25 April 2011, Somoano was promoted as Bolowich's replacement, thus becoming the fifth head coach in the Tar Heels' history. Upon his unveiling as head coach, he said, "It is an honor to be able to represent the University of North Carolina and its tradition of excellence. I want to thank Mr. Dick Baddour for offering me the opportunity to lead the men's soccer program. When I came to Carolina nine years ago I was immediately welcomed into the Carolina family and I am excited that I will continue to be a part of this great institution. I would also like to thank Elmar Bolowich for his guidance and trust. He gave me the opportunity to be a Tar Heel and he was a great mentor to me."

in his first season with the Tar Heels, he led them to the 2011 NCAA Division I Men's Soccer Championship with a 1–0 win over The University of North Carolina at Charlotte men's soccer team. The Tar Heels posted a 21–2–3 mark en route to the title. They also became only the second team in Atlantic Coast Conference history to claim the treble in a single year by winning the ACC regular season title, the ACC Tournament crown and the national championship. As such, he was awarded the Atlantic Coast Conference Men's Soccer Coach of the Year for the 2011 season.

In the following season, the Tar Heels did well in recording a 16–4–3 mark and came within one match of a fifth-straight College Cup, ultimately falling 1–0 to eventual national champion Indiana in the quarterfinal round of the NCAA tournament. The 2013 Tar Heels featured one of the top defensive sides in the nation and they advanced to the second round of the NCAA tournament, finishing with a 9–6–5 record. 2014 turned out to be another stellar campaign for the Tar Heels, who posted a 15–5–2 overall mark and again reached the NCAA quarter-finals for the sixth time in the last seven seasons. They were a prolific scoring team, leading the country in goals (52) and total points (157) and were second with 53 assists.

As of August 2015, Somoano's record with the Tar Heels is 61–17–13.
