= 2011 Akron Zips men's soccer team =

Akron Zips
2011 season
- Athletic Director: (United States) Tom Wistrcill
- Head Coach: (United States) Caleb Porter
- MAC Regular Season: 1st
- MAC Tournament: Semifinals
- College Cup: Third round
Home colors	Away colors

The 2011 Akron Zips men's soccer team represented the University of Akron during the 2010 NCAA Division I men's soccer season. The Zips finished the season winning the 2010 NCAA Division I Men's Soccer Championship, making it the first time in their history to win the national title.

== Match results ==
=== Key ===
Win Tie Loss

- Home team is listed on the right

=== Preseason ===
August 20, 2011	Creighton	1–1	#7 Akron	Fort Wayne, Indiana
16:00 EST	Ribeiro 12'	Report	Mattocks 44'	Stadium: Hefner Soccer Complex
Note: Exhibition was part of the ShinDigz Soccer Festival. No formal box score was kept, and the tied stood at the end of regulation.

=== Regular season ===
August 27, 2011 Gameday 1	Cleveland State	0–5	#2 Akron	Akron, Ohio
19:30 ET		Report	Mattocks 7', 31'; Bolgun 13'; Caldwell 22'; Barrett 48'	Stadium: FirstEnergy Stadium; Attendance: 5,241; Referee: Timothy Dicken

September 1, 2011 Gameday 2	#2 Akron	0–0 (a.e.t.)	Cal State Fullerton	Northridge, California
16:30 ET		Report		Stadium: CSUB Main Soccer Field; Attendance: 539; Referee: Ali Hacock

September 3, 2011 Gameday 3	#2 Akron	2–1 (a.e.t.)	Cal State Northridge	Northridge, California
TBD ET	Mattocks 25'; Barson (yellow card) 50'; Gallego (yellow card) 57' (red card) 83'; Caldwell 106'	Report	Hamilton (yellow card) 4' (yellow-red card) 18'; Barak (yellow card) 12'; Rosas (yellow card) 13'; Rivas (yellow card) 57'; Azulay 82'	Stadium: CSUB Main Soccer Field; Attendance: 1,097; Referee: Alex Gorin

September 10, 2011 Gameday 4	#2 Akron	4–0	Saint Louis	St. Louis, Missouri
TBD ET				Stadium: Hermann Stadium

September 16, 2011 Gameday 5	#8 New Mexico	1–1 (a.e.t.)	#2 Akron	Akron, Ohio
19:00 ET	Sandoval (yellow card) 54'; Venter 81'; Gibbons (yellow card) 84'	Report	Balogun 37'; Meves (yellow card) 52'; Mattocks (yellow card) 58'	Stadium: FirstEnergy Stadium; Attendance: 4,301; Referee: Chris Penso

=== MAC Tournament ===
November 11, 2011 SF	Western Michigan	1–1 (a.e.t.) (4–3 p)	#7 Akron	Akron, Ohio
17:00 EST	Raak 84'	Report	Dagilis 65'	Stadium: FirstEnergy Stadium; Attendance: 1,559; Referee: Michael Allie

=== NCAA Tournament ===
November 17, 2011 R1	#25 Northwestern	1–3	#10 Akron	Akron, Ohio
19:30 ET	O'Neill 63'	Report	Caldwell 27'; Quinn 55'; Mattocks 77'	Stadium: FirstEnergy Stadium; Attendance: 2,616; Referee: Ben Trevino

November 20, 2011 R2	#10 Akron	3–2	#19 SMU	University Park, Texas
20:00 ET	Mattocks 22', 76'	Report	Engel 82'; Ivo 83' (pen.)	Stadium: Westcott Field; Attendance: 890; Referee: Misail Tsapos

November 27, 2011 R3	#10 Akron	0–1	#15 Charlotte	Charlotte, North Carolina
20:00 ET	Trapp (yellow card) 9'; Yeldin (yellow card) 80'	Report	Kirkbride (yellow card) 6'; Thomas (yellow card) 12'; Gentile 25' (yellow card) 58'; Cowles (yellow card) 41'; Smith (yellow card) 66'	Stadium: Transamerica Field; Attendance: 2,182; Referee: Mark Kadlecik

== Team ==
=== Roster ===
As of September 8, 2011

Note: Flags indicate national team as defined under FIFA eligibility rules; some limited exceptions apply. Players may hold more than one non-FIFA nationality.

No.	Pos.	Nation	Player
00	GK	(United States) USA	Anthony Ponikvar
1	GK	(South Africa) RSA	JP Van Der Merwe
2	DF	(Colombia) COL	Cristian Arboleda
3	DF	(United States) USA	Chad Barson
4	DF	(United States) USA	Bryan Gallego
6	MF	(United States) USA	Wil Trapp
7	MF	(Costa Rica) CRC	Reinaldo Brenes
8	DF	(England) ENG	David Mayer
9	MF	(United States) USA	Aodhan Quinn
10	FW	(Jamaica) JAM	Darren Mattocks
11	FW	(Jamaica) JAM	Akeil Barrett
13	MF	(United States) USA	Zac Portillos
14	MF	(United States) USA	Eric Stevenson

No.	Pos.	Nation	Player
15	MF	(United States) USA	Scott Caldwell
16	MF	(United States) USA	David Murrow
17	DF	(United States) USA	DeAndre Yedlin
19	MF	(United States) USA	Dominic Bonilla
20	FW	(England) ENG	Luke Holmes
21	DF	(United States) USA	Philip Spaniel
22	DF	(United States) USA	Kayvon Afsarifard
23	GK	(United States) USA	Andrian McAdams
24	GK	(United States) USA	David Meves
25	DF	(United States) USA	Matt Dagilis
26	FW	(United States) USA	Andy Chiu
27	MF	(United States) USA	Michael Balogun
30	GK	(United States) USA	Jake Fenlason

== Transfers ==
=== Out ===
No.	Pos.	Player	Transferred to	Fee/notes	Date	Source
5	DF	(United States) Perry Kitchen	(United States) D.C. United	Selected in the 2011 MLS SuperDraft	January 13, 2011	
6	MF	(Liberia) Darlington Nagbe	(United States) Portland Timbers	Selected in the 2011 MLS SuperDraft	January 13, 2011	
2	MF	(United States) Zarek Valentin	(United States) Chivas USA	Selected in the 2011 MLS SuperDraft	January 13, 2011	
8	DF	(United States) Kofi Sarkodie	(United States) Houston Dynamo	Selected in the 2011 MLS SuperDraft	January 13, 2011	
9	MF	(United States) Michael Nanchoff	(Canada) Vancouver Whitecaps	Selected in the 2011 MLS SuperDraft	January 13, 2011	
16	DF	(United States) Chris Korb	(United States) D.C. United	Selected in the 2011 MLS SuperDraft	January 13, 2011	
10	MF	(Thailand) Anthony Ampaipitakwong	(United States) San Jose Earthquakes	Selected in the 2011 MLS SuperDraft	January 13, 2011	
