= 2011 Atlantic Sun Conference men's soccer tournament =

Tournament details
- Country: United States
- Teams: 6

Final positions
- Champions: FGCU
- Runners-up: ETSU

The 2011 Atlantic Sun Conference men's soccer tournament was the 2011 edition of the tournament, which determines the men's college soccer champion of the Atlantic Sun Conference, as well as the conference's automatic berth into the 2011 NCAA Division I Men's Soccer Championship. The tournament began in mid-November and was won by the Florida Gulf Coast Eagles.

== Bracket ==
First round
4	Mercer	2
5	Lipscomb	1
3	Jacksonville	0
6	ETSU	2

Semifinals
1	FGCU	2
4	Mercer	1
2	Stetson	3 (4)
6	ETSU (pen.)	3 (5)

Championship
1	FGCU	1
6	ETSU	0

== Schedule ==
Higher seed is listed on the right.

=== First round ===
November 9, 2011
17:00 EST

Lipscomb	1 – 2	Mercer
Pettis 43'	Report	Edmondson 76'; King 82'

Summers-Taylor Stadium
Johnson City, Tennessee
Attendance: 118
Referee: Jonathan Glover

November 9, 2011
19:00 EST

ETSU	2 – 0	Jacksonville
Haba 5', 20'	Report

Summers-Taylor Stadium
Johnson City, Tennessee
Attendance: 577
Referee: Dmitar Chavdarov

=== Semifinals ===
November 11, 2011
17:00 EST

Mercer	1 – 2	FBCU
Henry 65'	Report	Raudales 38'; Silva 59'

Summers-Taylor Stadium
Johnson City, Tennessee
Referee: Terry Vaughn

November 11, 2011
19:00 EST

ETSU	3 – 3 (a.e.t.)	Stetson
Doumbe 24'; Geno 49', 88'	Report	Bostič 4'; Helland 7'; Westbrook 90' (o.g.)
Penalties
Schoenfeld (penalty missed); Geno (penalty scored); Yang (penalty missed); Hodges (penalty scored); Fubara (penalty missed); Woodruff (penalty scored); Osorio (penalty scored); Campbell (penalty scored)	5 – 4	Ocejo (penalty missed); Eckenrode (penalty scored); Mendoza (penalty missed); Beates (penalty scored); De Mujica (penalty missed); Hogan (penalty scored); Helland (penalty scored); Asare-Bediako (penalty missed)

Summers-Taylor Stadium
Johnson City, Tennessee
Attendance: 519
Referee: Jonathan Glover

=== Atlantic Sun Championship ===
November 13, 2011
17:00 EST

ETSU	0 – 1	FGCU
	Report	Harrison 89'

Summers-Taylor Stadium
Johnson City, Tennessee
Attendance: 1,048
Referee: Jonathan Glover

== See also ==
- Atlantic Sun Conference
- 2011 Atlantic Sun Conference men's soccer season
- 2011 in American soccer
- 2011 NCAA Division I Men's Soccer Championship
- 2011 NCAA Division I men's soccer season
