= ACC men's soccer tournament =

College soccer tournament

- Atlantic Coast Conference men's soccer championship
- Sport: College soccer
- Conference: Atlantic Coast
- Number of teams: 15
- Format: Single-elimination
- Current stadium: WakeMed Soccer Park
- Current location: Cary, North Carolina
- Played: 1987–present
- Last contest: 2026
- Current champion: North Carolina (4th title)
- Most championships: Virginia (11)
- TV partner(s): ESPN3, ESPNU
- Official website: theacc.com/msoc

The ACC men's soccer tournament is the conference championship tournament in soccer for the Atlantic Coast Conference (ACC). The tournament has been held every year since 1987. It is a single-elimination tournament and seeding is based on regular season records.

The winner, declared conference champion, receives the conference's automatic bid to the NCAA Division I men's soccer championship. Beginning in 2024, the tournament expanded from 12 teams to 15, with the No. 1 seed receiving a first-round bye; seeds 2-8 hosting first-round games; No. 1 seed and top remaining seeds in each bracket hosting quarterfinal games. The semifinals and championship game are all played at the same location.

Virginia is the most winning team of the ACC tournament with 11 conference titles.

== Champions ==
The following is a list of Atlantic Coast Conference (ACC) Tournament winners:

=== Finals ===
Key

- (1) – Title number
- a.e.t. – Match went to extra time
- p – Match decided by a penalty shootout after extra time
- **Bold** – Winner won regular season
- – Winning team reached College Cup
- – Winning team won National Championship

==== Year by year ====
Ed.	Year	Champion	Score	Runner-up	Venue	Tournament MVP
1	1987	**North Carolina** (1)	4–3 (a.e.t.)	NC State	Duke Soccer Stadium • Durham, NC	Derek Missimo (UNC)
2	1988	**Virginia** (1)	2–1	North Carolina	Riggs Field • Clemson, SC	none named
3	1989	**Wake Forest** (1)	2–2 (5–3 p)	NC State	Duke Soccer Stadium • Durham, NC	Neil Covone (Wake)
4	1990	**NC State** (1)	2–1	Virginia	Duke Soccer Stadium • Durham, NC	Henry Gutierrez (NC State)
5	1991	**Virginia** (2)	3–1	Wake Forest	Fetzer Field • Chapel Hill, NC	Claudio Reyna (Virginia)
6	1992	**Virginia** (3)	4–2	Clemson	Fetzer Field • Chapel Hill, NC	Brad Agoos (Virginia)
7	1993	**Virginia** (4)	2–1	Clemson	Fetzer Field • Chapel Hill, NC	Jaro Zawislan (Clemson)
8	1994	**Virginia** (5)	1–0	Duke	Riggs Field • Charlottesville, SC	Mark Peters (Virginia)
9	1995	**Virginia** (6)	1–0	Clemson	Duke Soccer Stadium • Durham, NC	Mike Fisher (Virginia)
10	1996	**Maryland** (1)	2–0	Virginia	Klöckner Stadium • Charlottesville, VA	Pierre Venditti (Maryland)
11	1997	**Virginia** (7)	2–0	Maryland	Wide World of Sports • Orlando, FL	Ben Olsen (Virginia)
12	1998	**Clemson** (1)	1–0	Duke	Spry Stadium • Winston-Salem, NC	Josh Campbell (Clemson)
13	1999	**Duke** (1)	2–1 (a.e.t.)	Virginia	Spry Stadium • Winston-Salem, NC	Troy Garner (Duke)
14	2000	**North Carolina** (2)	1–0 (a.e.t.)	Virginia	Spry Stadium • Winston-Salem, NC	Caleb Norkus (UNC)
15	2001	**Clemson** (2)	2–1	Virginia	Riggs Field • Charlottesville, SC	Ian Fuller (Clemson)
16	2002	**Maryland** (2)	3–0	Virginia	SAS Soccer Complex • Cary, NC	Abe Thompson (Maryland)
17	2003	**Virginia** (8)	1–1 (7–6 p)	Maryland	SAS Soccer Complex • Cary, NC	Ryan Burke (Virginia)
18	2004	**Virginia** (9)	2–1	Maryland	SAS Soccer Complex • Cary, NC	Jeremy Barlow (Virginia)
19	2005	**Duke** (2)	0–0 (5–4 p)	North Carolina	SAS Soccer Complex • Cary, NC	Blake Camp (Duke)
20	2006	**Duke** (3)	1–0 (a.e.t.)	Wake Forest	SoccerPlex • Germantown, MD	Michael Videira (Duke)
21	2007	**Boston College** (1)	2–1	Wake Forest	SAS Soccer Complex • Cary, NC	Sherron Manswell (BC)
22	2008	**Maryland** (3)	1–0	Virginia	WakeMed Soccer Park • Cary, NC	Jeremy Hall (Maryland)
23	2009	**Virginia** (10)	1–0	NC State	WakeMed Soccer Park • Cary, NC	Diego Restrepo (Virginia)
24	2010	**Maryland** (4)	1–0	North Carolina	WakeMed Soccer Park • Cary, NC	Zac MacMath (Maryland)
25	2011	**North Carolina** (3)	3–1	Boston College	WakeMed Soccer Park • Cary, NC	Ben Speas (North Carolina)
26	2012	**Maryland** (5)	2–1	North Carolina	SoccerPlex • Germantown, MD	Patrick Mullins (Maryland)
27	2013	**Maryland** (6)	1–0	Virginia	SoccerPlex • Germantown, MD	Patrick Mullins (Maryland)
28	2014	**Clemson** (3)	2–1 (a.e.t.)	Louisville	WakeMed Soccer Park • Cary, NC	Paul Clowes (Clemson)
29	2015	**Syracuse** (1)	1–0	Notre Dame	Alumni Stadium • Notre Dame, Indiana	Ben Polk (Syracuse)
30	2016	**Wake Forest** (2)	3–1	Clemson	MUSC Health Stadium • Charleston, SC	Ian Harkes (Wake Forest)
31	2017	**Wake Forest** (3)	0–0 (4–3 p)	Virginia	MUSC Health Stadium • Charleston, SC	Andreu Mundet (Wake Forest)
32	2018	**Louisville** (1)	1–0	North Carolina	Sahlen's Stadium • Cary, NC	Tate Schmitt (Louisville)
33	2019	**Virginia** (11)	3–1	Clemson	Sahlen's Stadium • Cary, NC	Henry Kessler (Virginia)
34	2020	**Clemson** (4)	2–1	Pittsburgh	Sahlen's Stadium • Cary, NC	Kimarni Smith (Clemson)
35	2021	**Notre Dame** (1)	2–0	Duke	WakeMed Soccer Park • Cary, NC	Dawson McCartney (Notre Dame)
36	2022	**Syracuse** (2)	2–0	Clemson	WakeMed Soccer Park • Cary, NC	Russell Shealy (Syracuse)
37	2023	**Clemson** (5)	1–1 (5–3 p)	North Carolina	WakeMed Soccer Park • Cary, NC	Ousmane Sylla (Clemson)
38	2024	**Wake Forest** (4)	1–1 (7–6 p)	Clemson	WakeMed Soccer Park • Cary, NC	Prince Amponsah (Wake Forest)
39	2025	**SMU** (1)	1–0	Virginia	WakeMed Soccer Park • Cary, NC	Slade Starnes (SMU)
40	2026	**North Carolina** (4)	3–0	SMU	WakeMed Soccer Park • Cary, NC	Joschi Schelb (North Carolina)

=== By school ===
Through 2026

School	Apps	W	L	T	Pct.	Titles	Winning years
Boston College	19	8	16	1	.340	1	2007
California	3	4	2	1	.643	0	
Clemson	39	33	28	8	.536	5	1998, 2001, 2014, 2020, 2023
Duke	39	23	32	6	.426	3	1999, 2005, 2006
Louisville	11	8	9	1	.472	1	2018
Maryland	27	28	19	2	.592	6	1996, 2002, 2008, 2010, 2012, 2013
NC State	38	18	30	6	.389	1	1990
North Carolina	39	34	27	9	.550	4	1987, 2000, 2011, 2026
Notre Dame	12	9	9	3	.500	1	2021
Pittsburgh	11	7	9	2	.444	0	
SMU	3	7	1	1	.833	1	2025
Stanford	3	3	3	0	.500	0	
Syracuse	11	10	8	5	.543	2	2015, 2022
Virginia	39	51	24	10	.659	11	1988, 1991, 1992, 1993, 1994, 1995, 1997, 2003, 2004, 2009, 2019
Virginia Tech	21	7	19	1	.278	0	
Wake Forest	39	25	33	13	.444	4	1989, 2016, 2017, 2024

Florida State, Georgia Tech, and Miami do not sponsor men's soccer.
Teams in italics no longer sponsor soccer in the ACC.

=== Pre-tournament champions ===
Prior to 1987, the champion was determined based on regular season play.

Season	Champion	Runner-up
1953	Maryland	Duke
1954	Maryland	North Carolina
1955	Maryland	North Carolina
1956	Maryland	Virginia
1957	Maryland	Virginia
1958	Maryland	North Carolina
1959	Maryland	North Carolina
1960	Maryland	Duke
1961	Maryland	Duke
1962	Maryland	North Carolina
1963	Maryland	Virginia
1964	Maryland	North Carolina
1965	Maryland	North Carolina
1966	Maryland	—
1966	North Carolina	—
1967	Maryland	North Carolina
1968	Maryland	North Carolina
1969	Virginia	Maryland
1970	Virginia	Maryland

Season	Champion	Runner-up
1971	Maryland	Duke
1972	Clemson	Duke
1973	Clemson	Maryland
1974	Clemson	Maryland
1975	Clemson	North Carolina
1976	Clemson	Maryland
1977	Clemson	North Carolina
1978	Clemson	North Carolina
1979	Clemson	North Carolina; Virginia
1980	Duke	Clemson; NC State
1981	Clemson	Duke
1982	Clemson; Duke	—
1983	Virginia	Duke
1984	Virginia	Clemson; NC State
1985	Clemson	Virginia
1986	Virginia	NC State

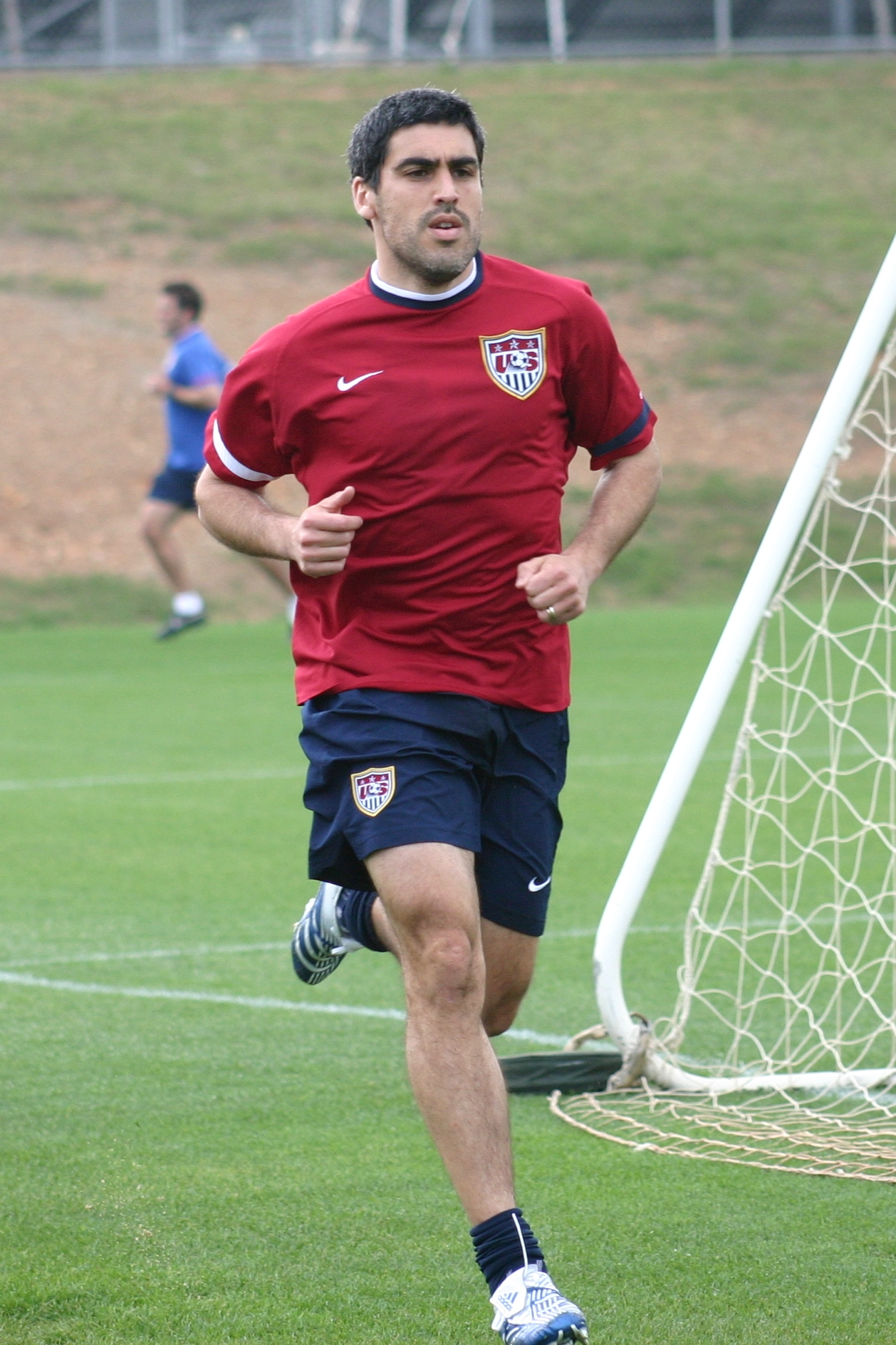
Claudio Reyna was the 1991 ACC tournament MVP

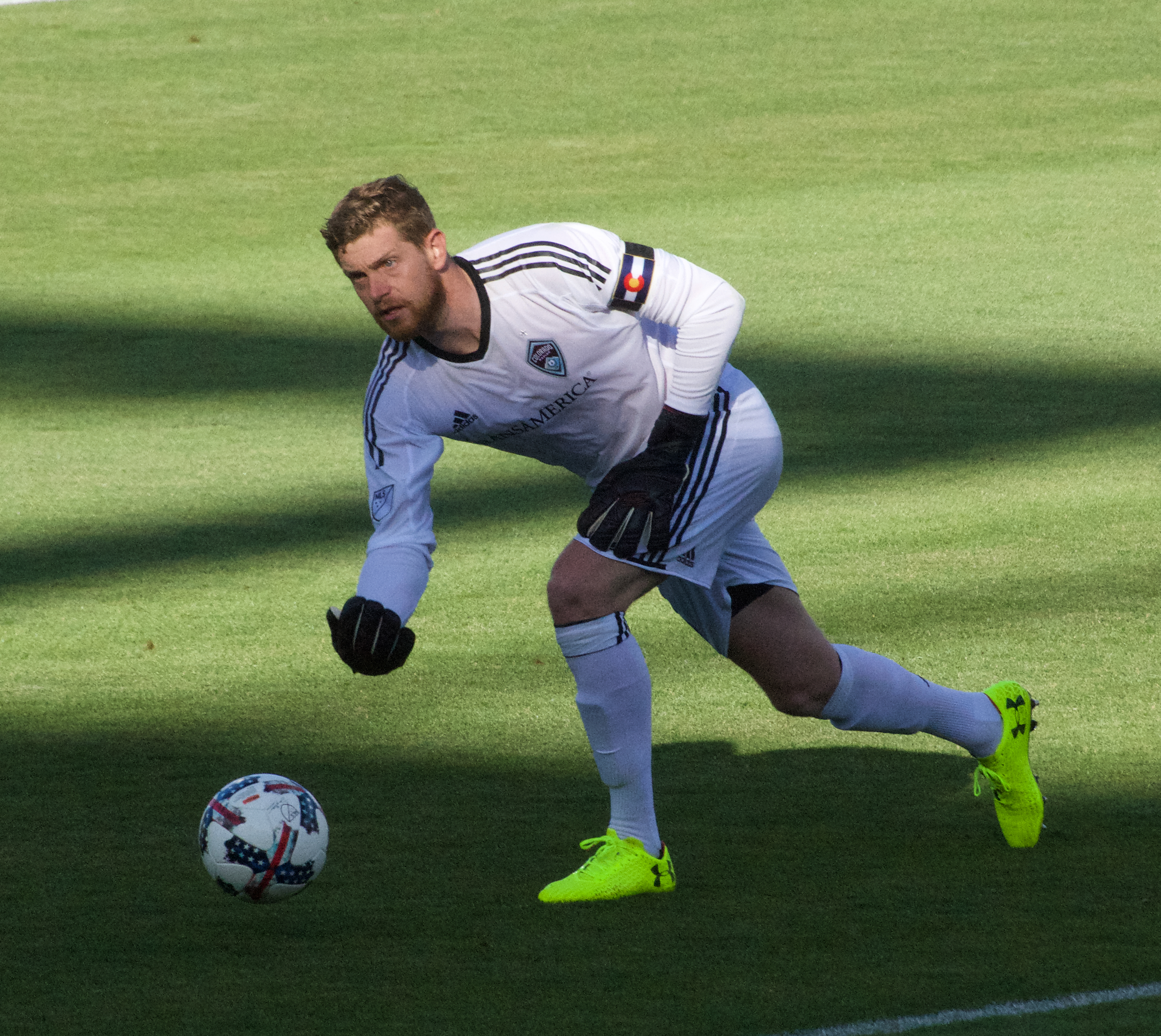
Zac MacMath won the ACC tournament MVP award in 2010
