= Josh Campbell (soccer) =

American soccer player (born 1978)

Personal information
- Full name: Joshua Campbell
- Date of birth: August 10, 1978 (age 48)
- Place of birth: Baltimore, Maryland, U.S.
- Height: 6 ft 4 in (1.93 m)
- Position: Goalkeeper

Youth career
- Olympic Development Program

College career
Years	Team	Apps	(Gls)
1996–1999	Clemson Tigers		

Senior career*
Years	Team	Apps	(Gls)
2000	Charleston Battery	5	(0)
2000–2001	Baltimore Blast	7	(0)
Total		12	(0)
- * Club domestic league appearances and goals

Joshua Campbell (born August 10, 1978) is an American former soccer player.

== Club career ==
After graduating from Clemson University, where he had been named ACC Men's Soccer Tournament MVP in 1998, Campbell was signed to A-League side Charleston Battery ahead of the 2000 season. He would go on to make five appearances for Charleston Battery.

During the 2000–01 National Professional Soccer League season, Campbell joined the Baltimore Blast, where he would make seven appearances.

== Career statistics ==
=== Club ===
Club	Season	League			Cup		Continental		Other		Total	
Club	Season	Division	Apps	Goals	Apps	Goals	Apps	Goals	Apps	Goals	Apps	Goals
Charleston Battery	2000	A-League	5	0	0	0	–		0	0	5	0
Baltimore Blast	2000–01	NPSL	7	0	0	0	–		0	0	7	0
Career total			12	0	0	0	0	0	0	0	12	0
