= 2011 Big West men's soccer tournament =

The 2011 Big West Conference Tournament was the postseason tournament of the Big West Conference to determine the Big West Conference's champion and automatic berth into the 2011 NCAA Division I Men's Soccer Championship. The tournament was won by UC Irvine, who defeated UC Santa Barbara in double overtime in the championship game.

== See also ==
- Big West Conference
- 2011 Big West Conference men's soccer season
- 2011 in American soccer
- 2011 NCAA Division I Men's Soccer Championship
- 2011 NCAA Division I men's soccer season
