= Mark Peters (American soccer) =

American soccer player

Personal information
- Position: Goalkeeper

College career
Years	Team	Apps	(Gls)
1993–1995	Virginia Cavaliers		

Senior career*
Years	Team	Apps	(Gls)
- Alajuelense
1997	Hershey Wildcats	2	(0)
1997	Carolina Dynamo	3	(0)
Total		5	(0)
- * Club domestic league appearances and goals

Mark Peters is an American former soccer player.

== Club career ==
After leaving the University of Virginia, where he had been named ACC Men's Soccer Tournament MVP in 1994, Peters spent seven months in Costa Rica with Alajuelense, before returning to the United States to play in the A-League.

== Career statistics ==
=== Club ===
Club	Season	League			Cup		Continental		Other		Total	
Club	Season	Division	Apps	Goals	Apps	Goals	Apps	Goals	Apps	Goals	Apps	Goals
Hershey Wildcats	1997	A-League	2	0	0	0	–		0	0	2	0
Carolina Dynamo	1997	A-League	3	0	0	0	–		0	0	3	0
Career total			5	0	0	0	0	0	0	0	5	0
