= 2011 MAC men's soccer tournament =

2011 Mid-American Conference men's soccer tournament
Tournament details
- Country: United States
- Teams: 4

Final positions
- Champions: Northern Illinois
- Runner-up: Western Michigan

Tournament statistics
- Matches played: 3
- Goals scored: 4 (1.33 per match)

The 2011 MAC men's soccer tournament was a college soccer postseason tournament for the Mid-American Conference to determine the MAC's champion and automatic berth into the 2011 NCAA Division I Men's Soccer Championship. The tournament was held in Akron, Ohio at the University of Akron's FirstEnergy Stadium. The tournament was held from November 11–13, 2011.

Northern Illinois won the championship. Akron would also qualify for the NCAA Tournament through an at-large bid.

== Bracket ==
Semifinals
1	Akron	1
4	Western Michigan (pen.)	1
2	Northern Illinois	1
3	Buffalo	0

Championship
4	Western Michigan	0
2	Northern Illinois	1

== Schedule ==
=== Semifinals ===
The home team/higher seed is listed on the right, the away team/lower seed is listed on the left.

November 11, 2011
17:00 EST

Western Michigan	1 – 1	#7 Akron
Raak 84'	Report	Dagilis 65'
Penalties
Mayer (penalty scored); Schiffer (penalty scored); Schrauben (penalty scored); Grant (penalty scored)	4 – 3	Trapp (penalty scored); Holmes (penalty scored); Caldwell (penalty missed); Quinn (penalty scored); Mattock (penalty missed)

FirstEnergy Stadium
Akron, Ohio
Attendance: 1,559
Referee: Michael Allie

November 11, 2011
20:00 EST

Buffalo	0 – 1	Northern Illinois
	Report	Rivera 63'

FirstEnergy Stadium
Akron, Ohio
Attendance: 1,559
Referee: Tony DeLois

=== MAC Championship ===
November 13, 2011
16:00 EST

Western Michigan	0 – 1	Northern Illinois
	Report	Totsch 84'

FirstEnergy Stadium
Akron, Ohio
Attendance: 167
Referee: Khalaf Al-Latayfeh

== See also ==
- Mid-American Conference Men's Soccer Tournament
- 2011 Mid-American Conference men's soccer season
- 2011 in American soccer
- 2011 NCAA Division I Men's Soccer Championship
- 2011 NCAA Division I men's soccer season
