= David Opoku =

Ghanaian footballer (born 1992)

Personal information
- Full name: David Osei Opoku
- Date of birth: 31 January 1992 (age 34)
- Place of birth: Accra, Ghana
- Height: 6 ft 2 in (1.88 m)
- Position: Forward

Youth career
- Achimota School
- 2010–2011: UC Santa Barbara Gauchos

Senior career*
Years	Team	Apps	(Gls)
2012	MYPA	13	(0)
2012	→ IF Gnistan (loan)	6	(7)
2014	Sanat Mes Kerman F.C.	3	(0)
2015	Al Egtmaaey Tripoli	17	(10)
2016	Tripoli SC	10	(5)
2017–2018	Muaither SC	4	(1)

International career^{‡}
2011–2014	Ghana U23	3	
- * Club domestic league appearances and goals as of 20:55, 1 November 2016 (UTC) ‡ National team caps and goals as of 22:34, 4 January 2016 (UTC)

David Osei Opoku (born 31 January 1992) is a Ghanaian former professional footballer who played as a forward.

== Early life and education ==
Opoku played for Achimota School in Accra, Ghana and trained with Chelsea in England before moving to the United States to play college football for the University of California, Santa Barbara. He spent two seasons with the UC Santa Barbara Gauchos men's soccer team. He was the 2010 Big West Conference Freshman of the Year and named to the 2010 All-Big West Second Team. He ended his career with the Gauchos with 15 goals and 7 assists.

== Club career ==
After a few months of trials, Opoku signed a contract with Finnish Veikkausliiga club Myllykosken Pallo −47 in April 2012. He played in 13 Veikkausliiga matches with the club, scoring no goals. He did score in his lone 2012–13 UEFA Europa League appearance on 12 July 2012 against Cefn Druids A.F.C.

Opoku was sent on loan to IF Gnistan, who play in the Finnish Kakkonen, in August 2012 to see out the remainder of his contract where he scored 7 goals in 10 matches.

He joined Iranian club Sanat Mes Kerman F.C. on a short-term deal in March 2014 and recorded one assist during his time with the club.

In Fall 2015, he signed for Lebanese Premier League side Al Egtmaaey Tripoli.

He then joined rivals Tripoli SC the following year.

In the summer of 2017, he signed with Qatar Stars League club Muaither SC.

== International career ==
David was called up to train with the Ghana national under-23 football team in June 2011 when he was still enrolled at UC Santa Barbara. He appeared in an exhibition against Deportivo FC and scored a goal. He was again called up to camp with the national team in October 2014 and made the trip to Nigeria to play against the Nigerian senior national team in a friendly played in honor of the opening of the Akwa Ibom international stadium. He made a second-half appearance in the game and nearly equalized.

== Honours ==
Individual

- Big West Conference Freshman of the Year: 2010
