= Billy Schuler =

American association football player

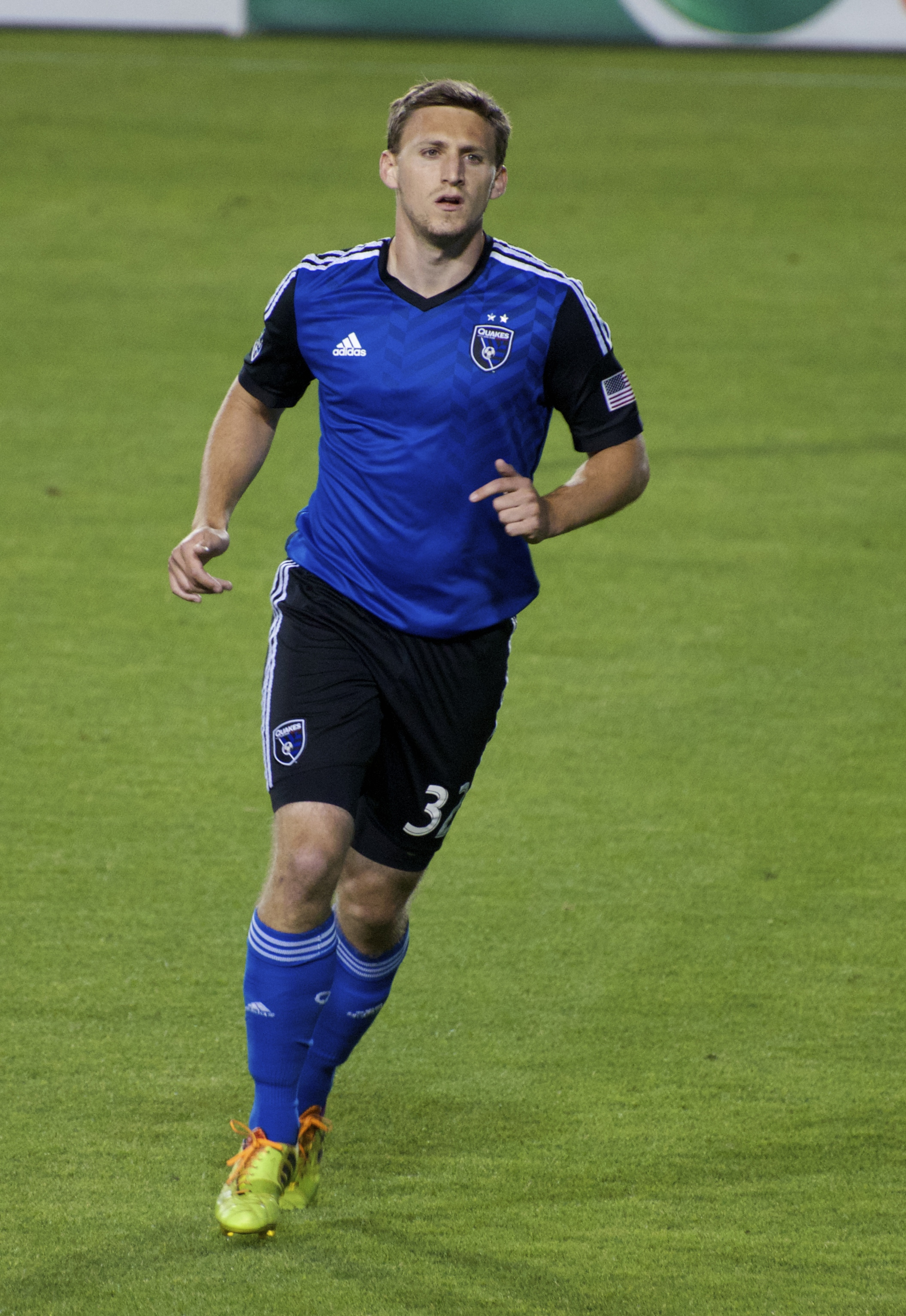

Personal information
- Full name: William Jason Schuler
- Date of birth: April 27, 1990 (age 36)
- Place of birth: Hamilton, New Jersey, United States
- Height: 1.80 m (5 ft 11 in)
- Position: Forward

College career
Years	Team	Apps	(Gls)
2008–2011	North Carolina Tar Heels	79	(29)

Senior career*
Years	Team	Apps	(Gls)
2008–2009	Cary Clarets	5	(2)
2010	Reading United	8	(4)
2012–2013	Hammarby IF	26	(2)
2012	→ Nacka FF (loan)	10	(2)
2014	San Jose Earthquakes	6	(0)
2015	Whitecaps FC 2	26	(2)
2016–2017	North Carolina FC	30	(6)

International career
2006–2007	United States U17	7	(2)
2006–2007	United States U20	4	(1)
Medal record
Representing United States
Runner-up	CONCACAF U-20 Championship	2009
- * Club domestic league appearances and goals as of 13:33, 30 October 2017 (UTC)

William Jason Schuler (born April 27, 1990) is an American former professional soccer player.

== Career ==
=== Youth and college ===
A resident of Allentown, New Jersey, Schuler attended Peddie School.

Schuler played three seasons over four years (redshirting his junior year after an injury) at the University of North Carolina.

=== Professional ===
Schuler signed with Hammarby IF of Sweden's Superettan after the 2011 NCAA season. He spent two years in Sweden, scoring two goals for Hammarby in 26 appearances. He signed with Major League Soccer in January 2014 and was assigned to the San Jose Earthquakes by a weighted lottery.

Schuler made his Earthquakes' debut on March 19, 2014, in a 1–1 draw against Toluca in the 2013–14 CONCACAF Champions League quarterfinals. Schuler was released by San Jose on December 11, 2014.

On March 27, 2015, Schuler signed with Whitecaps FC 2 of the United Soccer League.

After one season in Vancouver, Schuler moved to North American Soccer League club Carolina RailHawks on January 6, 2016.
