= Giuseppe Gentile (soccer) =

American soccer player (born 1992)

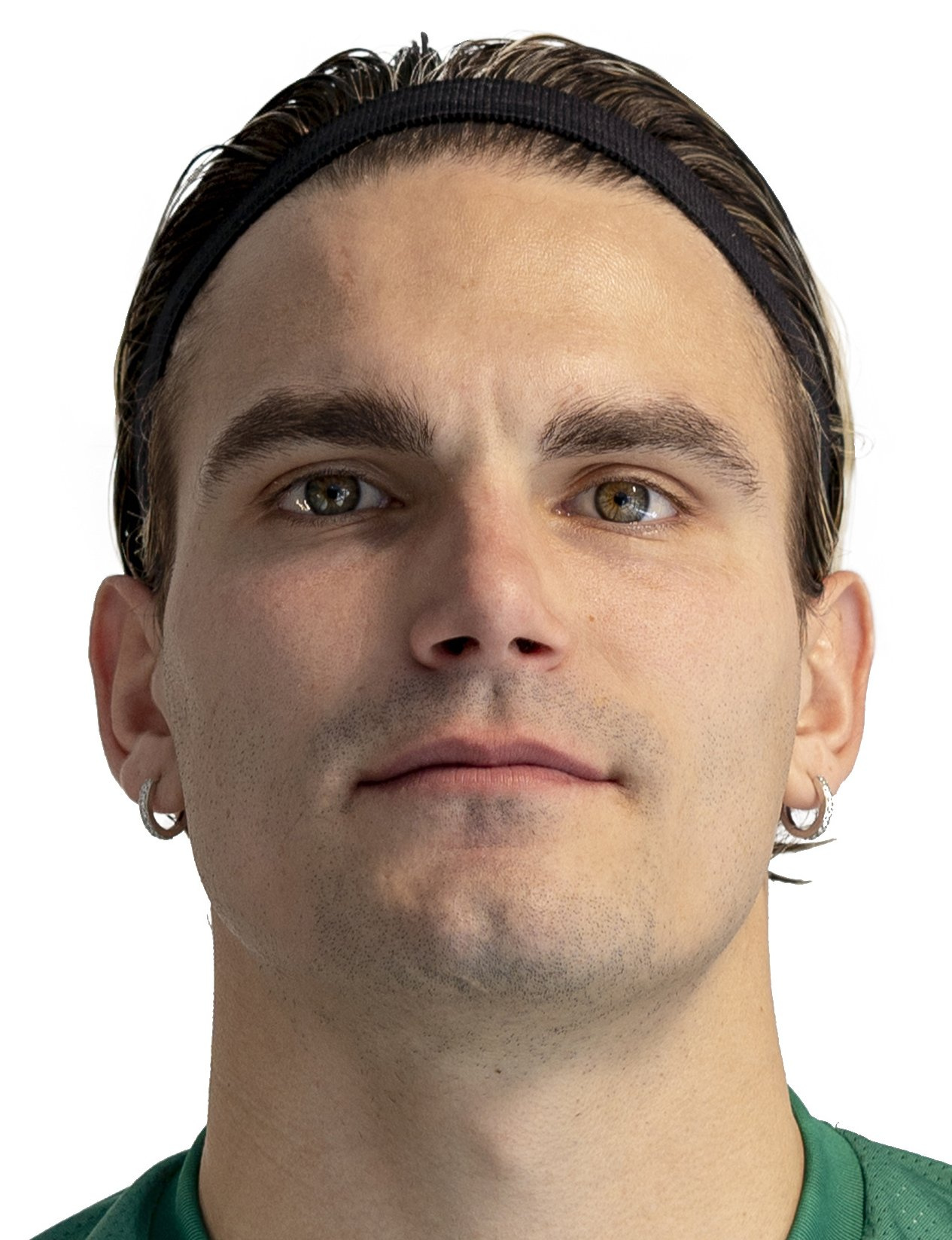

Personal information
- Full name: Giuseppe Vincenzo Gentile
- Date of birth: October 18, 1992 (age 34)
- Place of birth: Miami, Florida, United States
- Height: 6 ft 0 in (1.83 m)
- Position: Forward

Team information
- Current team: Chur 97
- Number: 92

Youth career
- 2008–2010: Charlotte Soccer Academy

College career
Years	Team	Apps	(Gls)
2011–2013	Charlotte 49ers	67	(27)

Senior career*
Years	Team	Apps	(Gls)
2014	Chicago Fire	0	(0)
2014	→ Charlotte Eagles (loan)	11	(1)
2014	Orlando City	11	(2)
2014	San Antonio Scorpions	5	(0)
2015–2016	FC Chiasso	9	(0)
2015	→ San Antonio Scorpions (loan)	16	(2)
2016	Fort Lauderdale Strikers	9	(1)
2016	Ottawa Fury FC	16	(4)
2017	Puerto Rico FC	27	(4)
2018	Richmond Kickers	16	(2)
2019	Hartford Athletic	13	(0)
2020	FC Linth 04		
2020–	Chur 97	3	(1)
- * Club domestic league appearances and goals as of 16:30, 7 November 2020 (UTC)

Giuseppe Vincenzo Gentile (born October 18, 1992) is an American professional soccer player who plays as a forward for Swiss club Chur 97.

== Career ==
After three seasons at UNC Charlotte, Gentile left college early and signed an MLS contract on January 22, 2014. Two days later, he was acquired by Chicago Fire through the waiver draft. On April 10, Gentile was loaned to USL Pro club Charlotte Eagles. He made his professional debut two days later in a 2–1 victory over Richmond Kickers.

After his release from Chicago, Gentile signed with USL Pro club Orlando City on July 11, 2014. He was released upon the conclusion of the 2014 season, a casualty of the club's transition to Major League Soccer.

On January 21, 2015, Gentile signed with Swiss Challenge League club FC Chiasso.

During the NASL's midseason break on June 24, 2015, it was announced the Gentile would be returning to San Antonio on a loan deal.

Gentile signed with Fort Lauderdale Strikers of NASL in December 2015.

On July 8, 2016, Gentile was traded by Fort Lauderdale to the Ottawa Fury in exchange for Brazilian winger Paulo Jr. In December 2016 the club announced, that Gentile wouldn't continue in the club.

Gentile joined Puerto Rico FC ahead of the 2017 season. He was released at the end of the season.

Gentile joined USL side Richmond Kickers for the 2018 season on January 23, 2018.

Gentile signed with USL Championship expansion club Hartford Athletic on January 23, 2019. Gentile returned to Switzerland in January 2020, joining FC Linth 04.
