= Donnie Smith (soccer) =

American soccer player (born 1990)

Personal information
- Full name: Donald W. Smith
- Date of birth: December 7, 1990 (age 35)
- Place of birth: Detroit, Michigan, United States
- Height: 1.80 m (5 ft 11 in)
- Positions: Left-back; left winger

College career
Years	Team	Apps	(Gls)
2010–2012	Charlotte 49ers		

Senior career*
Years	Team	Apps	(Gls)
	Carolina Dynamo	34	(1)
2013–2017	New England Revolution	6	(0)
2014	→ Rochester Rhinos (loan)	8	(0)
2016	→ Rochester Rhinos (loan)	1	(0)
2017	→ Charlotte Independence (loan)	10	(0)
2018	Charlotte Independence	7	(0)
- * Club domestic league appearances and goals

Donald W. Smith (born December 7, 1990) is an American retired soccer player who played as a left back for the New England Revolution of MLS and the Charlotte Independence of the USL Championship.

== Career ==
=== Charlotte 49ers ===
Smith attended Charlotte Catholic High School in Charlotte, North Carolina before playing at UNC-Charlotte. As a four-year player at Charlotte, Smith scored 18 goals with 10 assists in 82 appearances (45 starts) for the 49ers. From 2010 to 2012, Smith was named to the Atlantic-10 All-Conference team and in 2012 was named the Conference Midfielder of the Year. In 2011, Smith helped propel Charlotte to a runner-up finish in the NCAA Division I Men's Soccer Championship. He was named to the College Cup All-Tournament team after playing a key role in the 49ers run to the College Cup Championship game.

=== New England Revolution ===
Smith was selected as the first pick in the 2nd round of the 2013 MLS SuperDraft and 21st pick overall by the New England Revolution on January 17, 2013. On March 9, 2013, Smith officially made his Major League Soccer debut for the Revolution in their match against the Chicago Fire. Re-signed with the Revs on January 13, 2014.

=== Charlotte Independence ===
Smith signed with USL side Charlotte Independence on January 15, 2018. He retired from professional soccer shortly after the conclusion of the 2018 season.

== Career statistics ==
Appearances and goals by club, season and competition
Club	Season	League		MLS Cup		US Open Cup		CONCACAF		Total	
Club	Season	Apps	Goals	Apps	Goals	Apps	Goals	Apps	Goals	Apps	Goals
New England Revolution	2013	1	0	0	0	0	0	–		1	0
Career total		1	0	0	0	0	0	0	0	1	0
