= Mamadou Diouf (footballer) =

Senegalese professional footballer

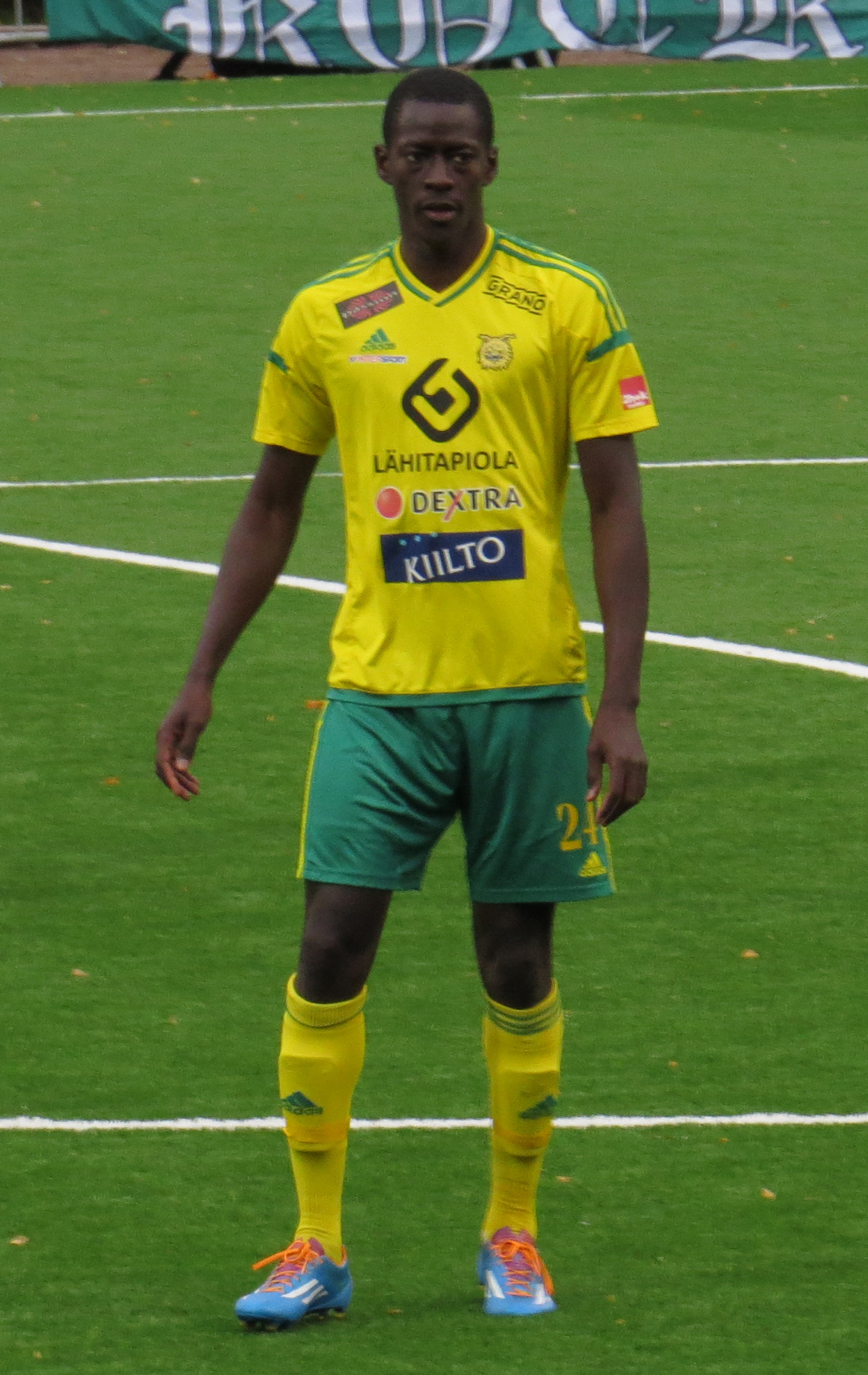
- Diouf in 2015

Personal information
- Full name: Mamadou Doudou Diouf
- Date of birth: 15 September 1990 (age 36)
- Place of birth: Dakar, Senegal
- Height: 1.86 m (6 ft 1 in)
- Position: Forward

Youth career
- 2010–2013: Connecticut Huskies

Senior career*
Years	Team	Apps	(Gls)
2014	Vancouver Whitecaps FC	0	(0)
2014	→ Charleston Battery (loan)	17	(3)
2015	Ilves	8	(0)
- * Club domestic league appearances and goals as of 17 November 2015

Mamadou Doudou Diouf (born 15 September 1990) is a Senegalese professional footballer.

== Career ==
=== Early career ===
Diouf played college soccer at the University of Connecticut between 2010 and 2013. In total Diouf scored 36 goals and added 10 assists in 74 career appearances with the Huskies.

=== Vancouver Whitecaps FC ===
On 16 January 2014 Diouf was selected second round (30th overall) of the 2014 MLS SuperDraft by the Vancouver Whitecaps FC. He signed with Vancouver and was loaned out to their USL Pro affiliate Charleston Battery in March 2014. Diouf made his professional debut on 22 March 2014 and scored in a 1–1 draw against Orlando City.
