= 2011 ACC men's soccer tournament =

Tournament details
- Country: United States
- Teams: 9

Final positions
- Champions: North Carolina
- Runners-up: Boston College

Tournament statistics
- Matches played: 8
- Goals scored: 23 (2.88 per match)

The 2011 ACC Men's Soccer Tournament was the 25th edition of the tournament, which determined the men's college soccer champion of the Atlantic Coast Conference, as well as the conference's automatic berth into the 2011 NCAA Division I Men's Soccer Championship. The tournament began on November 7, with N.C. State defeating Virginia Tech 1–0 in a play-in fixture. The ACC Championship was played on November 13 at WakeMed Soccer Park in Cary, North Carolina with North Carolina defeating Boston College 3–1 in the final.

As ACC Champions, North Carolina qualified for the 2011 NCAA Division I Men's Soccer Championship, and would eventually win the national championship, making it the second time in the last two years an ACC school won the national tournament. Additionally five ACC schools qualified for the tournament through at-large bids, the most of any conference.

The defending champions, Maryland, were eliminated by Clemson in the quarterfinals of the tournament.

== Bracket ==
Play-in Round
8	N.C. State	1
9	Virginia Tech	0

Quarterfinals
1	North Carolina	4
8	N.C. State	0
4	Virginia (a.e.t.)	4
5	Wake Forest	3
2	Maryland	1
7	Boston College	2
3	Duke (a.e.t.)	0
6	Clemson	0

Semifinals
1	North Carolina (a.e.t.)	1
4	Virginia	0
7	Boston College	2
3	Duke	1

Championship
1	North Carolina	3
7	Boston College	1

== Schedule ==
The home team/higher seed is listed on the right.

=== Play-in round ===
November 7, 2011
13:00 EST

Virginia Tech	0 – 1	N.C. State
	Report	Albadawi 60'

Fetzer Field
Chapel Hill, North Carolina
Attendance: 59
Referee: Alex Prus

=== Quarterfinals ===
November 8, 2011
19:00 EST

N.C. State	0 – 4	North Carolina
	Report	Gafa 13'; Hedges 33'; Lopez 49'; McCrary 50'

Fetzer Field
Chapel Hill, North Carolina
Attendance: 562
Referee: Oscar Ortiz

November 8, 2011
19:00 EST

Boston College	2 – 1	Maryland
Medina-Mendez 14'; Rugg 18'	Report	Townsend 47'

Ludwig Field
College Park, Maryland
Attendance: 1,201
Referee: Chris Penso

November 8, 2011
19:00 EST

Clemson	0 – 0 (a.e.t.)	Duke
	Report
Penalties
Savage (penalty scored); Benediktsson (penalty scored); Stockinger (penalty scored); Priest (penalty scored); Mizell (penalty missed)	4 – 5	Belshaw (penalty scored); Morales (penalty scored); Davis (penalty scored); Eggleston (penalty scored); Wenger (penalty scored)

Koskinen Stadium
Durham, North Carolina
Attendance: 527

November 8, 2011
19:00 EST

Wake Forest	3 – 4 (a.e.t.)	Virginia
Lubahn 3'; Gimenez 79', 81'	Report	Jumper 52'; Ownby 71'; Span 75' 110'

Klöckner Stadium
Charlottesville, Virginia
Attendance: 907
Referee: Mohammad Samadpour

=== Semifinals ===
November 11, 2011
17:30 EST

North Carolina	1 – 0 (a.e.t.)	Virginia
Schuler 92'	Report

WakeMed Soccer Park
Cary, North Carolina
Attendance: Not reported
Referee: Tony Crush

November 11, 2011
19:30 EST

Boston College	2 – 1	Duke
Aburmad 25'; Mendia Mendez 66'	Report	Eggleston 15'

WakeMed Soccer Park
Cary, North Carolina
Attendance: Not reported
Referee: Kevin Terry

=== ACC Championship ===
November 11, 2011
17:30 EST

Boston College	1 – 3	North Carolina
Bekker 62'	Report	McCrary 38'; Speas 42', 65'

WakeMed Soccer Park
Cary, North Carolina
Attendance: Not reported
Referee: Tony Russo
