= Elmar Bolowich =

American soccer coach

Biographical details
- Born: July 10, 1954 (age 72); Edenkoben, Germany

Coaching career (HC unless noted)
- 1988–2010: North Carolina
- 2011–2018: Creighton
- 2020–2022: George Mason

Elmar Bolowich (born July 10, 1954) was most recently head coach of the George Mason Patriots men's soccer team at George Mason University in Fairfax, Virginia, United States. He was previously the head coach of the Creighton Bluejays men's soccer team at Creighton University in Omaha, Nebraska for eight years after leaving his 22-year tenure as the head coach of the North Carolina Tar Heels men's soccer team at the University of North Carolina.

== Career ==
=== Creighton Bluejays ===
Bolowich joined Creighton University on February 9, 2011. He is assisted by Johnny Torres and Michael Gabb, both former players of Creighton University.

Bolowich led the Bluejays to an overall 95–29–12 record. In 2015, the Creighton Bluejays men's soccer team had 19 wins during the season, the most wins in Division I, as well as a scoring average of 2.3 goals per game (the third-best scoring offense in the nation). The same season, Bolowich recruited Fabian Herbers, a runner-up for the MAC Hermann Trophy, and Big East Conference Offensive Player of the Year. Fabian Herbers and Timo Pitter represented Creighton Bluejays men's soccer and were both named to the NCSAA All-America First Team. Vincent Keller was selected for the NCSAA All-America Third Team and the Big East Conference First Team. Success for Bolowich and the Creighton Bluejays men's soccer saw additional rewards, as then freshman, Joel Rydstrand, made the Big East Conference All-Freshman team; Timo Pitter won the Big East Conference Midfielder of the Year; and Connor Sparrow earned BIG EAST Co-Goalkeeper of the Year. Fabian Herbers and Timo Pitter were drafted into the MLS, although Timo Pitter retired in January 2017.

In 2014, Bolowich and the Creighton Bluejays men's soccer lead the nation with the best winning percentage 16–3–3 (.795) as well as the regular season champions of the Big East Conference (7–1–1). Bolowich shared the title of BIG EAST Coach of the Year, and Fabian Herbers Timo Pitter won BIG EAST Offensive and Midfield Players of the Year, respectively. In 2012, Bolowich led Creighton to 17–4–3 record and their second consecutive NCAA Division I College Cup although both times the team fell just short of the National Title. In his inaugural season at Creighton, Bolowich won three coaching awards: NCSAA Midwest Coach of the Year; Missouri Valley Conference Coaching Staff of the Year; and the MLSSoccer.com Coach of the Year.

The Creighton Bluejays men's soccer team plays at Morrison Stadium, unique in that Creighton University is the only university with a stadium exclusive to soccer.

=== North Carolina Tar Heels ===
Bolowich compiled a 280–144–40 (0.647) record in 22 seasons with North Carolina, making him the winningest coach of the North Carolina Tar Heels men's soccer program. Under Bolowich's direction, the North Carolina Tar Heels men's soccer won the 2001 NCAA Division 1 Championship by defeating the Indiana University Hoosiers 2–0 with a 21–4–0 record on the season. This marked the first national title for the North Carolina Tar Heels men's soccer program. Coach Bolowich led the program to the NCAA tournament in nine out of his last 10 seasons, and reached the Elite Eight five of his last 10 seasons. In 2001, he won the NSCAA National Coach of the Year award. During his last 11 seasons at North Carolina, Bolowich led the team to 6 appearances in the NCAA quarterfinals. He led the North Carolina Tar Heels men's soccer team to the NCAA tournament 15 times as well as three NCAA College Cup appearances in the three years before he transferred to Creighton University.

Under Coach Bolowich, the Tar Heels also won the 2000 Atlantic Coast Conference championship and the regular season titles in 2000, 2009, and 2010. Bolowich won the NSCAA National Coach of the Year Award in 2001 as well as the ACC Coach of the Year in 2000 and 2010.

At the University of North Carolina, he succeeded the then women's and men's soccer coach Anson Dorrance to take the head coaching position in 1988 after serving as a part-time assistant coach for the men's Tar Heel soccer team in 1986. From 1987–8, he was a full-time assistant coach to Dorrance. It was in 1987 when the Tar Heels won their first ACC tournament championship and advanced to their first Final Four 1987 NCAA Division I Men's Soccer Championship where North Carolina lost to Clemson University in the semi-final round 4–1. They also won their 1st ACC tournament, beating N.C. State in the final 3–2. The game was played at Riggs Field at Clemson University, despite the North Carolina Tar Heels men's soccer team having defeated Clemson Tigers men's soccer team twice earlier on in the 1987 season.

== Professional players coached ==
Bolowich coached 45 players onto the professional pitch since the beginning of Major League Soccer in 1996, some of whom went to play abroad, as well as on the United States men's national soccer team, the FIFA World Cup, and the Olympics. Four of Bolowich's former players have gone on to coach in the MLS.

=== Players who appeared on the United States men's national soccer team roster ===
- Eddie Pope – FIFA World Cup player in 1996, 2002, and 2006; 1996 Olympics; USMNT 1996–2006; D.C. United, MetroStars, Real Salt Lake
- Gregg Berhalter – FIFA World Cup player in 2002 and 2006: USMNT 1994–2006; Crystal Palace, 1860 Munich, Los Angeles Galaxy; head coach of Columbus Crew SC
- Kerry Zavagnin – USMNT 2000–2006; Kansas City Wizards; assistant coach for Sporting Kansas City
- Logan Pause – USMNT 2009; Chicago Fire; former interim assistant coach for Chicago Fire; head coach for Orange County SC
- Dax McCarty – USMNT 2009–; FC Dallas, D.C. United, New York Red Bulls, Chicago Fire
- Ethan Finlay – USMNT 2016–; Columbus Crew SC

=== Current and former professional players ===
- Timo Pitter
- Fabian Herbers
- Tyler Polak
- Eric Miller
- Greg Jordan
- Stephen McCarthy
- Rob Lovejoy
- Jalil Anibaba
- Michael Farfan
- Kirk Urso
- Zach Lloyd
- Eddie Ababio
- Corey Ashe
- Michael Harrington
- Jordan Graye
- Michael Ueltschey
- Justin Hughes
- Marcus Storey
- Tim Merritt
- Caleb Norkus
- Chris Leitch
- Eddie Robinson
- Matt Crawford
- Chris Carrieri
- Temoc Suarez
- Nicholas Efthimiou
- Chad Ashton
- David Testo
