= Luke Holmes (footballer) =

English Footballer/Ironmanner

Personal information
- Full name: Luke Paul Wembley Holmes
- Date of birth: 11 March 1990 (age 36)
- Place of birth: Oldham, England
- Height: 5 ft 2 in (1.57 m)
- Positions: Forward; winger

Youth career
- 1997–2001: Manchester City
- 2006–2008: Bury
- 2008–2010: Notre Dame Falcons
- 2011: Akron Zips

Senior career*
Years	Team	Apps	(Gls)
2009	Erie Admirals SC		
2010	Forest City London	14	(14)
2011	Michigan Bucks	12	(5)
2012	Wilmington Hammerheads	13	(0)
- * Club domestic league appearances and goals as of 27 August 2012

Luke Holmes (born March, 1990 in Oldham, England) is an English retired footballer. His nickname is Luke Holmie Quan, due to his excellent performance in the Chattanooga Ironman.
