= North Carolina Tar Heels men's soccer =

American college soccer team

- 2026 North Carolina Tar Heels men's soccer team
- Founded: 1947; 79 years ago
- University: University of North Carolina at Chapel Hill
- Head coach: Carlos Somoano (16th season)
- Conference: ACC
- Location: Chapel Hill, North Carolina, US
- Stadium: Dorrance Field (capacity: 4,200)
- Nickname: Tar Heels
- Colors: Carolina blue and white
Home	Away

NCAA tournament championships
- 2001, 2011

NCAA tournament runner-up
- 2008

NCAA tournament College Cup
- 1987, 2001, 2008, 2009, 2010, 2011, 2016, 2017, 2020

NCAA tournament Quarterfinals
- 1987, 2000, 2001, 2005, 2008, 2009, 2010, 2011, 2012, 2014, 2016, 2017, 2020, 2023

NCAA tournament appearances
- 1968, 1987, 1988, 1990, 1991, 1993, 1994, 1999, 2000, 2001, 2002, 2003, 2004, 2005, 2006, 2008, 2009, 2010, 2011, 2012, 2013, 2014, 2015, 2016, 2017, 2018, 2020, 2021, 2022, 2023, 2024, 2025

Conference tournament championships
- 1987, 2000, 2011, 2026

Conference regular season championships
- 2000, 2011, 2012 (shared), 2016 (shared)

The North Carolina Tar Heels men's soccer team represents the University of North Carolina at Chapel Hill in men's NCAA Division I soccer competition. They compete in the Atlantic Coast Conference. The Tar Heels won the NCAA championship in 2001 and 2011. They play at Dorrance Field.

== History ==
The UNC men's varsity soccer team was founded in 1947 by Dr. Marvin Allen, the team's first coach. Before the team had only been at the club level.

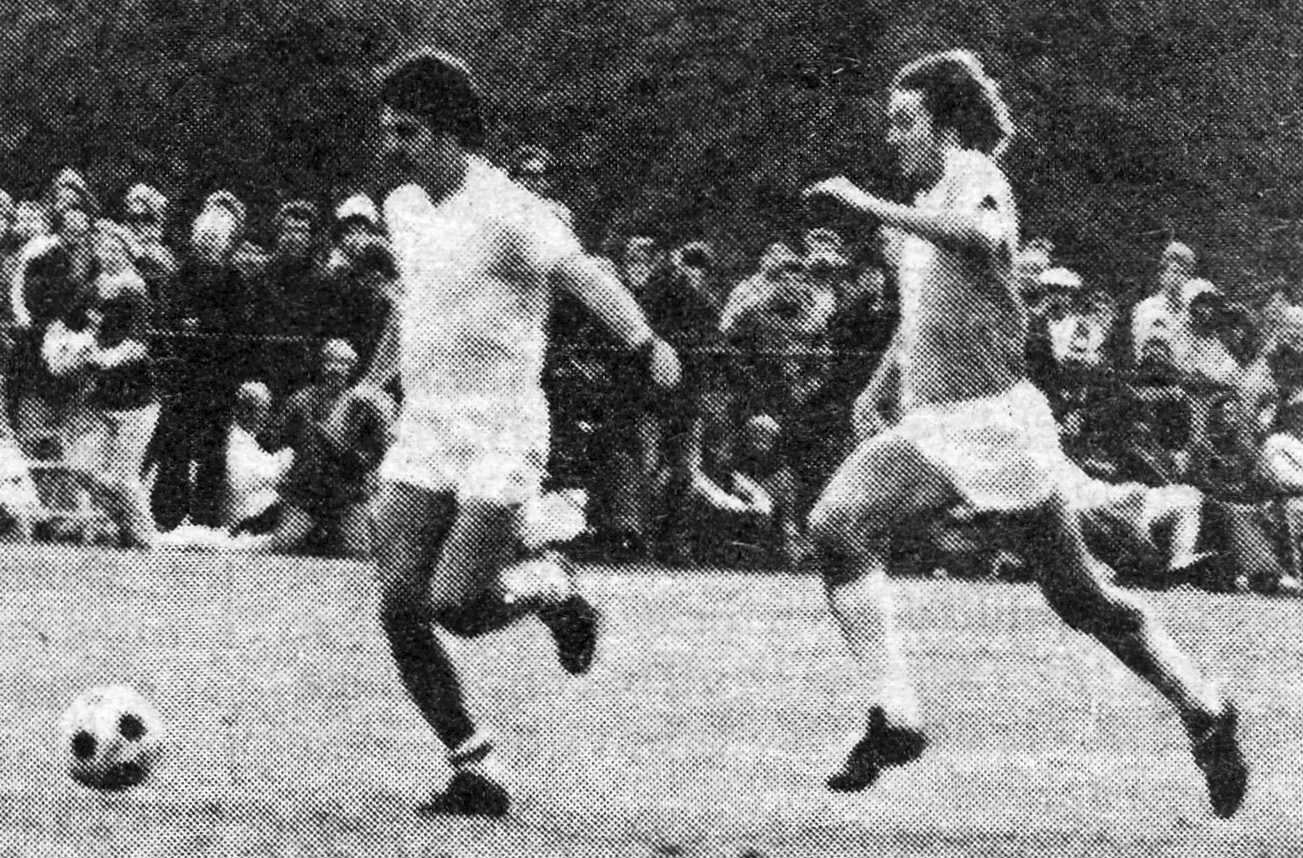
North Carolina v Duke match in 1980

Dr. Allen led the team until 1977 when the former UNC women's soccer team coach Anson Dorrance took over. Dorrance spent 12 successful seasons with the men's team until 1988. One of the main reasons for his retirement from the men's team was to focus on the women's program, which he had begun coaching while he was the men's coach. Dorrance led the Tar Heels to their first ACC Tournament Championship in the tournament's inaugural year, 1987.

Elmar Bolowich took the reins from Dorrance and led the team to a National Championship in 2001, the first of the program. Bolowich resigned in 2011, and the former assistant coach, and current head coach, Carlos Somoano was hired. In his first year as head coach, Somoano won the 2011 national championship, a feat only accomplished by one other coach, Indiana's Mike Freitag. The same year, he also won the ACC regular season, and the ACC Tournament, winning every title possible for the year. Since the program's founding in 1947, Carolina has posted only 2 losing seasons. Making 4 consecutive College Cup appearances from 2008 to 2011, UNC has established itself as a powerhouse in modern-day college soccer in one of the most dominant conferences in the country.

=== National championships ===
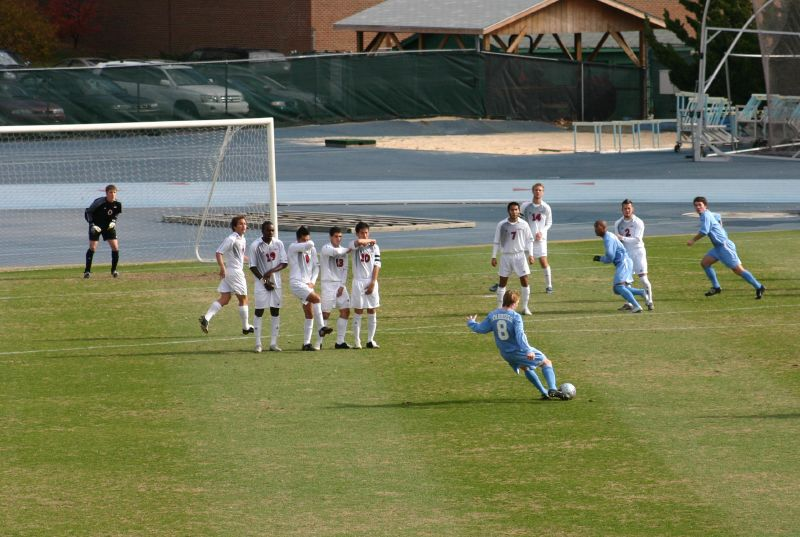
North Carolina taking a free kick vs. SMU in 2005

The 2001 NCAA Division I Men's Soccer Championship was the first national title that the men's soccer team earned. The road to the championship game saw the #7 seeded Tar Heels defeat #3 seeded Stanford by a score of 3–2 in overtime of the semifinals. That moved the Tar Heels along to the National Championship game against #4 seeded Indiana. The game would be won 2–0 by the Tar Heels in regular time with goals from Ryan Kneipper and Danny Jackson. When asked about the game, Coach Bolowich said, "I thought David- as well as our entire defense – played a fantastic game and the team effort was there". The team's record of 21–4 saw the program claim its first national title.

The 2011 NCAA Division I Men's Soccer Championship was the second national title the men's soccer team earned. During the course of the tournament, the #1 seeded Tar Heels defeated Coastal Carolina (3–2), Indiana (1–0 in OT), and Saint Mary's (2–0) respectively, to reach the College Cup. In the semifinal, the Tar Heels faced #13 seeded UCLA, and won the game 2–1, by way of a penalty kick shootout (3–1). Carolina faced the unseeded Charlotte 49ers in the final, winning the game 1–0 on a second-half Ben Speas goal. Team captain, Kirk Urso, who died due to a congenital heart defect at age 22, said in an interview after the game "My whole college career has been awesome, but there was something extra about this team. To cap it off with this is something I'm going to remember the rest of my life." A final record of 21–2–3 illustrates what a special year the Tar Heels had.

== Players ==
=== Current roster ===
As of November 7, 2026

Note: Flags indicate national team as defined under FIFA eligibility rules; some limited exceptions apply. Players may hold more than one non-FIFA nationality.

No.	Pos.	Nation	Player
0	GK	USA	Coleman Catlett
1	GK	USA	Alan Rutkowski
2	DF	USA	Myles Carson
4	DF	UGA	Steven Oyirwoth
5	DF	GER	Nick Lockermann
6	MF	SWE	Charlie Antonelius
7	FW	BER	Jace Donawa
8	MF	GER	Nico Loebus
9	FW	USA	Dan Klink
10	FW	GER	Joschi Schelb
11	FW	USA	Ryan Dugan
12	GK	USA	Marco Simion
13	DF	GER	Luca Nikolai
14	MF	MAW	Faraji Ramani
15	DF	ENG	Max Fisher

No.	Pos.	Nation	Player
16	MF	GHA	Evans Dapaah
17	DF	USA	Drew Waller
18	MF	USA	Jonathan Luna Sabando
19	FW	DEN	Bertil Rygaard Hansen
20	FW	USA	Lorenzo D'Agostini
21	MF	FRA	Benjamin Maitre
22	DF	USA	Etienne Veillard
23	DF	USA	Jayden Puna
24	GK	SUI	Alejandro Saborio Perez
25	MF	USA	David Molina
26	FW	DEN	Martin Mai
27	MF	USA	Ryan Zellefrow
28	DF	USA	Quinton John
33	DF	USA	Riley Berge
34	MF	NOR	Jarle Petzold

=== Current professionals ===
As of May 7, 2025

- (United States) Gregg Berhalter (1991–1994) – Currently head coach with Chicago Fire FC
- (United States) Kerry Zavagnin (1992–1995) – Currently interim head coach with Sporting Kansas City
- (United States) Tim Sahaydak (1995–1997) – Currently associate head coach with UCF (women)
- (Scotland) Jamie Clark (1996) – Currently head coach with Washington
- (United States) Chris Leitch (1997–2001) – Currently general manager with San Jose Earthquakes
- (United States) Michael Harrington (2003–2006) – Currently assistant coach with North Carolina
- (Ghana) Eddie Ababio (2006–2010) – Currently assistant coach with Tampa Bay United SC
- (United States) Alex Dixon (2008–2010) – Currently with Monterey Bay FC
- (Argentina) Enzo Martínez (2009–2011) – Currently with Birmingham Legion FC
- (United States) Mikey Lopez (2011–2012) – Currently with Portland Hearts of Pine
- (Jamaica) Omar Holness (2013–2015) – Currently with Hednesford Town F.C.
- (United States) Cameron Lindley (2016–2017) – Currently with Indy Eleven
- (Czech Republic) Jeremy Kelly (2016–2019) – Currently with Crawley Town F.C.
- (United States) Mauricio Pineda (2016–2019) – Currently with Chicago Fire FC
- (United States) Jack Skahan (2016–2019) – Currently with The Town FC
- (United States) John Nelson (2017–2018) – Currently with LA Galaxy
- (United States) Lucas del Rosario (2017–2021) – Currently with Kaya F.C.–Iloilo
- (United States) Sebastian Berhalter (2019) – Currently with Middlesbrough
- (United States) Blake Malone (2019) – Currently with Union Omaha
- (United States) Milo Garvanian (2018–2022) – Currently with Chattanooga FC
- (Venezuela) Santiago Herrera (2019–2021) – Currently with Manchego
- (Mexico) Jonathan Jiménez (2019–2021) – Currently with Hartford Athletic
- (Canada) Malik Henry (2020) – Currently with Toronto FC II
- (United States) Aldair Sanchez (2020–2021) – Currently with Rhode Island FC
- (United States) Tega Ikoba (2021) – Currently with FC Cincinnati 2
- (United States) Matthew Edwards (2021–2023) – Currently with Atlanta United FC
- (France) Quenzi Huerman (2023) – Currently with Colorado Springs Switchbacks FC
- (United States) Tate Johnson (2024) – Currently with Vancouver Whitecaps FC

=== Other notable alumni ===
- Eddie Pope

Eddie Pope played for the Tar Heels from 1992 to 1995. In 1994 he earned a spot on the first team All-American squad, as well as All-ACC and All-South Region honors. Pope was a key member of the Tar Heels' defensive line, who started every game of his college career. He also held the position of place kicker as a freshman for the UNC Football team, but choose to focus on soccer. Pope was eventually selected second overall in the MLS College Draft by D.C. United. He is a notable alumni member of the Tar Heel's men's soccer because of his induction to the North Carolina Soccer Hall of Fame, his 82 appearances and 8 goals for the U.S. full national team, and his charity The Eddie Pope Foundation.

- Kirk Urso

Kirk Urso was a member of the men's soccer program from 2008 to 2011, where he captained the team to the 2011 National Championship. He was drafted #10 in the 2012 MLS Supplemental Draft by the Columbus Crew in Ohio. Urso died of a congenital heart defect on August 5, 2012, after he had recorded 6 appearances with 5 starts for the Crew. Urso is a notable alumnus of the program because of the contribution that he gave to the team day in and day out. The Kirk Urso Heart Award is now given in his honor. Current head coach Somoano said "He's still remembered in our program, and always will be." The Columbus Crew have created The Kirk Urso Fund, "which supports research and programming focused on congenital heart defects and sudden cardiac death in youth."

- Gregg Berhalter

Gregg Berhalter played at UNC from 1991 to 1994 under Elmar Bolowich. He left after his junior year to turn professional and signed for the Dutch club Zwolle. He spent a period abroad until returning to the U.S. to play for the LA Galaxy in 2009. When he retired from his playing career in 2011, he also opened his managerial career by becoming the head coach at Hammarby IF in Sweden. He coached former player Billy Schuler, a member of the 2011 National Championship team, at Hammarby If. In 2013 Berhalter became the head coach of the Columbus Crew. He is a notable alumnus of the program because of his many years as a professional, and he is also the first American to manage a professional soccer team in Europe. In late 2018, Berhalter was hired as the United States Men's National team coach.

- Ben Speas

Ben Speas was a member of the Tar Heel's during the 2011 season only, after transferring from Akron University. He scored the winning goal in the 2011 National Championship game; giving the Tar Heels its second national title. He also was named the NCAA College Cup MVP after the final game. He was also a key member of the 2011 team, who made 25 starts in 26 games. Speas played a major role for the Tar Heels championship.

- J Batt

Jason Batt, known during his UNC playing career as Jay Batt and now publicly known as J Batt, was a backup goalkeeper for Carolina's 2001 national championship team. After earning bachelor's and master's degrees from UNC, he started a career in college sports administration, working at William & Mary, James Madison, Maryland, East Carolina, and Alabama before becoming athletic director at Georgia Tech in 2022. Batt moved from there to become athletic director at Michigan State in 2025, leaving after one year to take the same position at Kentucky.

== Facilities ==
=== Fetzer Field ===
Fetzer Field was originally built in 1935 as a part of president Franklin D. Roosevelt's Works Project Administration, which brought much needed jobs to native Tar Heels. It was originally constructed for the track and field team, named after a previous UNC athletic director, Bob Fetzer. However, Fetzer Field soon served home to men's soccer in 1947, men's lacrosse in 1949, women's soccer in 1979, and women's lacrosse in 1996. It has also served as a site for numerous men's and women's lacrosse and soccer ACC Championship events, National Junior Olympic events, and as the home training site for the U.S. Track and Field Team in 1996. In 2017 Fetzer Field was demolished to make way for Dorrance Field.

=== McCaskill Soccer Center ===
Located right next to Fetzer Field, the McCaskill Soccer Center serves multiple functions for Tar Heel men's and women's soccer. It holds the offices of both men's and women's coaches and a meeting room on the second level, complete with a deck. On the first level there are the men's and women's team locker rooms, as well as a team meeting room. Named after long time Tar Heel supporters, the McCaskill family, the McCaskill Soccer Center has been in use since 1999.

== Rivalries ==
=== Duke ===
Across all of college sports, the North Carolina vs. Duke rivalry is considered to be one of the greatest rivalry in the history of sports. The rivalry extends to soccer. Rated the No. 5 greatest rivalries in the history of college soccer by College Soccer News, this matchup not only has conference ramifications, but also Carlyle Cup ramifications, a trophy in which the two schools compete against each other yearly, encompassing all sports.

== Coaches ==
=== Carlos Somoano ===
Coach Somoano was hired as the head coach in 2011 after serving as an assistant to Elmar Bolowich since 2001. Somoano led the team to the 2011 National Championship and was also named National Coach of the Year. During his time away from Carolina Somoano also works with the Capital Area Soccer League youth club. Since 2002 he has contributed to the youth development by being a scout for the U.S. Soccer Development Academy. In his college career as a player at Eckerd College, he earned four letters, and was team captain twice, while he majored Biology with a concentration in pre-med. Somoano was inducted into the Eckerd College Athletics Hall of Fame in 2013. His previous jobs include an assistant at Virginia Commonwealth University from 1996 to 2001, and an assistant at Eckerd College from 1992 to 1995.

=== Grant Porter ===
Grant Porter is a current assistant coach and former UNC men's soccer player from 2000 to 2003. He was a key part of the 2001 national title, the first ever for the program. He was hired in 2011 and helped the team to the National title the same year. Before Carolina, Porter served as an assistant coach for UC Santa Barbara in 2005. From 2006 to 2011 he served as the Director of Soccer for Charlotte United Football Club in Charlotte, NC.

== Season awards ==
=== Kirk Urso Heart Award ===
Due to the death of Kirk Urso in 2012 from a congenital heart defect, the team, as of 2012, votes on the "individual that most embodies Urso's selflessness and tireless work ethic." Urso was a midfielder for the Columbus Crew at the time of his death.

2012– Jordan Gafa

2013– Verneri Valimaa

=== Tom Evins Jr. Most Improved Player Award ===
This award is presented to the player who has improved the most over the course of the previous year. Tom Evins Jr. is a former player and letterman from the class of 1961.

2012– Boyd Okwuonu

2013– Brendan Moore

=== Mercer Reynolds "Tar Heel" Award ===
This award is given to a player who exemplifies characteristics of what it means to be a Tar Heel student-athlete on the field, in the classroom and in the community.

- 2012 – David Walden
- 2013 – Alex Walters

=== Mike Thompson Most Valuable Player Award ===
This award goes to the player who is voted most valuable by his teammates. Mike Thompson was a former player, captain, and letterman that graduated in 1959.

2012– Boyd Okwuonu

2013– Jonathon Campbell

=== Nicholas Douglass Potter Coaches Award ===
This award is given to the "player who comes to practice and games everyday seeking to get better and is also a coachable player that helps to improve others around him." Nicholas Douglass Potter is an avid supporter of the men's soccer team and of UNC Athletics as a whole.

2012– Scott Goodwin

2013– Boyd Okwuonu

== Honours ==
- NCAA Division I tournament
  - Winners (2): 2001, 2011
- Atlantic Coast Conference
  - Winners (4): 1966, 1987, 2000, 2011
