= Ben Speas =

American soccer player

Personal information
- Full name: Benjamin Vance Speas
- Date of birth: January 17, 1991 (age 35)
- Place of birth: Stow, Ohio, United States
- Height: 1.73 m (5 ft 8 in)
- Positions: Forward; winger

Youth career
- 2002–2008: Everest SC
- 2007: IMG Soccer Academy
- 2008–2009: Columbus Crew

College career
Years	Team	Apps	(Gls)
2009–2010	Akron Zips	50	(4)
2011	North Carolina Tar Heels	26	(7)

Senior career*
Years	Team	Apps	(Gls)
2010	Michigan Bucks	4	(0)
2012–2015	Columbus Crew	41	(2)
2016	Minnesota United	26	(4)
2017–2019	Indy Eleven	50	(7)
2019	→ North Carolina FC (loan)	27	(2)
2020	North Carolina FC	14	(1)
Total		162	(16)

International career^{‡}
2007	United States U17	10	(1)
- * Club domestic league appearances and goals as of October 3, 2020 ‡ National team caps and goals as of November 1, 2012

Benjamin Vance Speas (born January 17, 1992) is a former American soccer player who played as a forward. Speas played for Columbus Crew, Minnesota United, Indy Eleven and North Carolina FC, before retiring on November 10, 2020.

== Career ==
=== Youth, college and amateur ===
As a Senior at Cuyahoga Valley Christian Academy, Speas was the Eighth-ranked senior in the nation according to ESPN Rise. He is also a Two-time Parade All-American and a Two-time NSCAA High School Boys All-American. He also played six seasons for Everest SC (Hudson, OH) and one season for the Columbus Crew Youth Academy.

In 2009, Speas committed to the University of Akron. In his freshman year, Speas appeared in all 25 matches and finished with two goals and three assists and was named College Cup All-Tournament Team. Akron finished the year unbeaten at 23–0–2, however they would eventually lose the College Cup final to the University of Virginia on penalties. In 2010, Speas appeared in all 25 games and finished with two goals and three assists. Akron would return to the National Title game and this time would come out on top after defeating top ranked Louisville 1-0 and capturing the school's first ever national title in any sport.

In July 2011, Speas transferred University of North Carolina. In his first and only season with the Tar Heels in 2011, Speas started 25 of his 26 appearances and recorded seven goals and 10 assists. One of the seven goals came in the College Cup final against UNC Charlotte, which also turned out to be the goal that won the National title for the Tar Heels.

Speas also spent the 2010 season with the Michigan Bucks in the USL Premier Development League.

=== Professional ===
==== Columbus Crew SC ====
Speas signed a multi-year contract with the Columbus Crew as a Home Grown Player ahead of the 2012 season. His debut didn't come until the final day of the season on October 28 as he got the start and went 64 minutes in Columbus's 2–1 victory over Toronto FC. His contract was not renewed following the 2015 season.

==== Minnesota United FC ====
In February 2016, Speas signed with North American Soccer League side Minnesota United.

=== International ===
Speas was a member of the U.S. Soccer Residency program in 2007. He made 10 appearances for the U.S. U17 and scored one goal. He was also called into both the U18 and U20 national team camps although he never made an official appearance for them.

== Honors ==
=== University of Akron ===
- Mid-American Conference Regular Season Championship (2): 2009, 2010
- Mid-American Conference Tournament Championship (2): 2009, 2010
- NCAA College Cup Championship (1): 2010

=== University of North Carolina ===
- Atlantic Coast Conference Regular Season Championship (1): 2011
- Atlantic Coast Conference Tournament Championship (1): 2011
- NCAA College Cup Championship (1): 2011

=== Individual ===
- NCAA College Cup Most Valuable Player (1): 2011
