= 2008 Maryland Terrapins men's soccer team =

Maryland Terrapins
2008 season
- Head Coach: Sasho Cirovski
- Stadium: Ludwig Field
- ACC: 2nd
- ACC Tournament: Winners
- NCAA Tournament: Winners
- Highest home attendance: 11,074 vs. GU
- Lowest home attendance: 978 vs. VT
Home colors	Away colors

The 2008 Maryland Terrapins men's soccer team represented the University of Maryland, College Park during the 2008 NCAA Division I men's soccer season. The team won its third NCAA College Cup title, and their first since 2005. The team included several future professional players, most notably, Graham Zusi and Omar Gonzalez.

== Roster ==
Note: Flags indicate national team as defined under FIFA eligibility rules; some limited exceptions apply. Players may hold more than one non-FIFA nationality.

No.	Pos.	Nation	Player
0	GK	CAN	Aaron Chinn
1	GK	USA	Zac MacMath
3	DF	USA	Sean Flatley
4	DF	USA	Omar Gonzalez
5	MF	USA	Doug Rodkey
6	MF	USA	Rich Costanzo
7	FW	USA	Casey Townsend
8	MF	USA	Matt Kassel
9	FW	USA	Jason Herrick
10	FW	MEX	Billy Cortes
11	MF	USA	Graham Zusi
12	MF	USA	Drew Yates
13	MF	IRL	Conor O'Leary

No.	Pos.	Nation	Player
14	DF	GHA	Kwame Darko
15	MF	USA	Kevin Tangney
16	MF	USA	Michael Marchiano
17	FW	USA	Jeremy Hall
18	DF	GUM	Alex Lee
19	FW	CMR	Matt Oduaran
20	DF	GUM	A. J. DeLaGarza
21	GK	USA	Will Swaim
22	MF	CRC	Rodney Wallace
23	MF	USA	Kaoru Forbess
24	DF	USA	Greg Young
25	FW	USA	Tyler Mishalow
26	MF	USA	Tommy Schaeffler

Source: UMTerps.com

== Schedule ==
Date	Time	Opponent	Rank	Location	Result	Scorers	Attendance	Record	Conf.	Ref.
Preseason
08/16/08	7:00 pm	at VCU	No. 8	Sports Backers Stadium • Richmond, VA	D 0–0^{2OT}		1,066	0–0–0		
08/22/08	7:30 pm	South Florida	No. 8	Ludwig Field • College Park, MD	L 1–2	Costanzo	1,244	0–0–0		
Regular season
08/29/08	10:30 pm	at No. 14 UCLA*	No. 8	The Home Depot Center • Carson, CA; UCLA Tournament	W 2–1^{OT}	Flatley, Wallace	3,214	1–0–0		
08/31/08	6:30 pm	vs. No. 23 California*	No. 8	Drake Stadium • Los Angeles, CA; UCLA Tournament	L 0–1		755	1–1–0		
09/05/08	7:00 pm	Hartford*	No. 9	Ludwig Field • College Park, MD	W 3–0	Rodkey, Gonzalez, Townsend	3,009	2–1–0		
09/07/08	7:00 pm	Davidson*	No. 9	Ludwig Field • College Park, MD	W 4–1	Hall (2), Townsend, Wallace	1,258	3–1–0		
09/12/08	7:30 pm	No. 9 Boston College	No. 8	Ludwig Field • College Park, MD	W 1–0	Zusi	2,750	4–1–0	1–0–0	
09/19/08	7:30 pm	No. 25 Duke	No. 4	Ludwig Field • College Park, MD	W 1–0	Gonzalez	6,083	5–1–0	2–0–0	
09/23/08	7:30 pm	American*	No. 2	Ludwig Field • College Park, MD	W 4–0	Townsend (2), Gonzalez, Oduaran	1,034	6–1–0		
09/26/08	7:30 pm	No. 1 Wake Forest	No. 2	Ludwig Field • College Park, MD	L 2–4	Herrick, Townsend	6,500	6–2–0	2–1–0	
09/30/08	8:00 pm	Binghamton*	No. 4	Ludwig Field • College Park, MD	W 1–0	Kassel	517	7–2–0		
10/03/08	7:00 pm	at Clemson	No. 4	Riggs Field • Clemson, SC	L 3–5	Hall (2), Townsend	828	7–3–0	2–2–0	
10/07/08	7:30 pm	No. 21 Charlotte*	No. 10	Ludwig Field • College Park, MD	W 2–1^{OT}	Hall, Townsend	746	8–3–0		
10/10/08	7:30 pm	at Virginia Tech	No. 10	Thompson Field • Blacksburg, VA	W 4–0	Hall (2), Herrick, Cortes	737	9–3–0	3–2–0	
10/14/08	6:00 pm	Lehigh*	No. 6	Ludwig Field • College Park, MD	W 2–1^{OT}	Gonzalez, Townsend	908	10–3–0		
10/17/08	7:30 pm	Evansville*	No. 6	Ludwig Field • College Park, MD	W 4–0	Townsend (2), Hall (2)	1,823	11–3–0		
10/21/08	7:00 pm	at West Virginia*	No. 6	Dlesk Stadium • Morgantown, WV	W 1–0	Hall	1,346	12–3–0		
10/25/08	7:00 pm	at NC State	No. 6	Method Road • Raleigh, NC	W 2–1	Herrick (2)	800	13–3–0	4–2–0	
10/31/08	7:30 pm	at Virginia; Rivalry	No. 5	Klöckner Stadium • Charlottesville, VA	W 2–1	Hall, Zusi	1,747	14–3–0	5–2–0	
11/07/08	7:30 pm	No. 20 North Carolina	No. 5	Ludwig Field • College Park, MD	W 2–1	Yates, Zusi	3,506	15–3–0	6–2–0	
ACC Tournament
11/12/08	3:00 pm	vs. (7) No. 23 North Carolina	(2) No. 3	WakeMed Soccer Park • Cary, NC; Quarterfinals	W 1–0	Hall	822	16–3–0		
11/14/08	5:00 pm	vs. (3) Boston College	(2) No. 3	WakeMed Soccer Park • Cary, NC; Semifinals	W 1–0	own goal	1,068	17–3–0		
11/16/08	12:00 pm	vs. (5) No. 19 Virginia	(2) No. 3	WakeMed Soccer Park • Cary, NC; ACC Championship	W 1–0	Hall	1,068	18–3–0		
NCAA Tournament
11/25/08	4:00 pm	George Mason	(2) No. 3	Ludwig Field • College Park, MD; Second round	W 2–0	Townsend, Zusi	2,064	19–3–0		
11/29/08	4:00 pm	No. 11 California	(2) No. 3	Ludwig Field • College Park, MD; Third round	W 2–1	Gonzalez, Hall	2,531	20–3–0		
12/06/08	7:30 pm	(7) No. 7 Creighton	(2) No. 3	Ludwig Field • College Park, MD; Quarterfinals	W 1–0	Wallace	2,902	21–3–0		
12/12/08	7:30 pm	vs. (3) No. 4 St. John's	(2) No. 3	Pizza Hut Park • Frisco, TX; Semifinals	W 1–0^{2OT}	Zusi	6,134	22–3–0		
12/14/08	12:30 pm	vs. (13) No. 10 North Carolina	(2) No. 3	Pizza Hut Park • Frisco, TX; National Championship	W 1–0	Zusi	6,594	23–3–0		
*Non-conference game. #Rankings from NSCAA. All times are in Eastern Time. (#) during ACC or NCAA Tournament is seed.
