= 1994 Virginia Cavaliers men's soccer team =

American college soccer season

1994 Virginia Cavaliers men's soccer

National Champions

ACC Tournament Champions

NCAA Tournament, Final - W 1–0 vs. Indiana
- Conference: Atlantic Coast Conference
- Record: 22–3–1 (4–2–0 ACC)
- Head coach: Bruce Arena (17th season)
- Assistant coach: George Gelnovatch (6th season)
- Home stadium: Scott Stadium

1994 ACC men's soccer standings
	Conf.					Overall
Team	W		L		T	W		L		T
No. 9 NC State +	5	–	1	–	0	14	–	7	–	0
No. 1 Virginia ‡	4	–	2	–	0	22	–	3	–	1
No. 12 Maryland +	3	–	3	–	0	14	–	6	–	1
No. 21 North Carolina +	3	–	3	–	0	13	–	7	–	0
No. 14 Duke +	3	–	3	–	0	15	–	7	–	1
Clemson	2	–	4	–	0	13	–	7	–	1
Wake Forest	1	–	5	–	0	10	–	8	–	1
‡ – ACC Men's Soccer Tournament champion + – Invited to the 1994 NCAA Division I Men's Soccer Tournament; Rankings from United Soccer Coaches

The 1994 Virginia Cavaliers men's soccer team represented the University of Virginia during the 1994 NCAA Division I men's soccer season. It was the program's 55th season of existence, and their 41st season in the Atlantic Coast Conference. The team was led by future National Soccer Hall of Fame member, Bruce Arena and their current coach, George Gelnovatch was an assistant.

== Schedule ==
Date Time, TV	Rank^{#}	Opponent^{#}	Result	Record	Site (Attendance) City, State
Regular season
September 3*	No. 1	Boston University; Coca-Cola Classic	L 2–3	0–1–0	Klöckner Stadium; Charlottesville, VA
September 4*	No. 1	No. 11 St. John's; Coca-Cola Classic	W 2–0	1–1–0	Klöckner Stadium; Charlottesville, VA
September 7*	No. 1	at No. 11 American	W 4–1	2–1–0	Reeves Field; Washington, DC
September 11	No. 1	No. 11 Maryland; Tydings Cup	W 4–2	3–1–0 (1–0–0)	Klöckner Stadium; Charlottesville, VA
September 14*	No. 1	at Virginia Tech; Commonwealth Clash	W 8–2	4–1–0	Johnson-Miller Field; Blacksburg, VA
September 18	No. 1	at Wake Forest	W 3–2	5–1–0 (2–0–0)	Poteat Field; Winston-Salem, NC
September 21*	No. 1	George Washington	W 7–0	6–1–0	Klöckner Stadium; Charlottesville, VA
September 25	No. 1	at No. 7 North Carolina; South's Oldest Rivalry	L 1–5	6–2–0 (2–1–0)	Fetzer Field; Chapel Hill, NC
September 28*	No. 6	at Richmond	W 6–2	7–2–0	Klöckner Stadium; Charlottesville, VA
October 2	No. 6	at No. 15 NC State	W 2–1	8–2–0 (3–1–0)	Klöckner Stadium; Charlottesville, VA
October 5*	No. 6	No. 15 Liberty	W 6–2	9–2–0	Klöckner Stadium; Charlottesville, VA
October 9	No. 6	at Clemson	W 6–4	10–2–0 (4–1–0)	Riggs Field; Clemson, SC
October 14*	No. 5	Dartmouth; Lanzera/Sheraton Classic	W 2–0	11–2–0	Klöckner Stadium; Charlottesville, VA
October 16*	No. 5	Princeton; Lanzera/Sheraton Classic	W 1–0	12–2–0	Klöckner Stadium; Charlottesville, VA
October 19*	No. 5	VCU	W 6–0	13–2–0	Klöckner Stadium; Charlottesville, VA
October 23	No. 5	No. 20 Duke	L 1–2 ^{OT}	13–3–0 (4–2–0)	Klöckner Stadium; Charlottesville, VA
October 29*	No. 9	Old Dominion	W 4–1	14–3–0	Klöckner Stadium; Charlottesville, VA
November 5*	No. 9	at George Mason	W 4–3	15–3–0	George Mason Stadium; Fairfax, VA
ACC Tournament
November 10	(2) No. 9	vs. (7) Wake Forest; First round	W 2–0	16–3–0	Riggs Field; Clemson, SC
November 11	(2) No. 9	at (6) Clemson; Semifinals	T 2–2; W 3–2 (p) ^{2OT}	16–3–1	Riggs Field; Clemson, SC
November 13	(2) No. 9	vs. (5) Duke; ACC Championship	W 1–0	17–3–1	Riggs Field; Clemson, SC
NCAA Tournament
November 20	(3) No. 4	UNCG; First round	W 3–0	18–3–1	Klöckner Stadium; Charlottesville, VA
November 27	(3) No. 4	Maryland; Second round	W 2–1	19–3–1	Klöckner Stadium; Charlottesville, VA
December 4	(3) No. 4	No. 10 James Madison; Quarterfinals	W 4–1	20–3–1	Klöckner Stadium; Charlottesville, VA
December 9	(3) No. 4	vs. Rutgers; College Cup	W 2–1	21–3–1	Richardson Stadium; Davidson, NC
December 11	(3) No. 4	vs. (1) No. 1 Indiana; National Championship	W 1–0	22–3–1	Richardson Stadium (12,033); Davidson, NC
*Non-conference game. ^{#}Rankings from United Soccer Coaches. (#) Tournament seedings in parentheses.
