= George Mason Patriots men's soccer =

American college soccer team

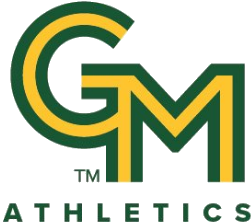
- Founded: 1968; 58 years ago
- University: George Mason University
- Head coach: Rich Costanzo (3rd season)
- Conference: Atlantic 10
- Location: Fairfax, Virginia, US
- Stadium: George Mason Stadium (capacity: 4,000)
- Nickname: Patriots
- Colors: Green and gold
Home	Away

NCAA tournament Quarterfinals
- 1982

NCAA tournament Round of 16
- 1982, 1985, 1986

NCAA tournament appearances
- 1982, 1984, 1985, 1986, 1987, 1989, 1990, 1996, 2006, 2008, 2013

Conference tournament championships
- CAA; 1984, 1985, 1989, 2008; Atlantic 10; 2013

Conference Regular Season championships
- 1983, 1986, 1989, 1990, 2024

The George Mason Patriots men's soccer team is a varsity intercollegiate athletic team of George Mason University in Fairfax, Virginia, United States. The team is a member of the Atlantic 10 Conference, which is part of the National Collegiate Athletic Association's Division I. George Mason's first men's soccer team was fielded in 1968. The team plays its home games at George Mason Stadium in Fairfax, Virginia.

Irad Young played for the team and earned All-Conference Honors in 1990 and 1992, All-Virginia, and All-South Atlantic Region, and was inducted into the GMU Soccer Hall of Fame in 2012. He broke the school's career assist record (20), and became the first GMU player to notch 20 goals and 20 assists.

== Year-by-year results ==
Season	Coach	Record	Postseason
1968	Dennis Fecteau	1–8–0	
1969	Dennis Fecteau	3–10–1	
1970	Louis Cable	4–7–0	
1971	Nandor Laszlo	7–4–0	
1972	March Krotee	12–3–1	
1973	March Krotee	12–5–0	
1974	March Krotee	11–6–3	VISA co-champions NAIA 8th Place
1975	Terry Wiltshire	3–9–0	
1976	Richard Broad	2–8–2	
1977	Richard Broad	2–11–1	
1978	Richard Broad	7–7–2	
1979	Richard Broad	9–9–0	
1980	Richard Broad	10–4–3	
1981	Richard Broad	12–2–4	
1982	Richard Broad	19–2–0	NCAA 3rd Round
1983	Richard Broad	12–6–2	
1984	Richard Broad	15–4–3	CAA Champions; NCAA 1st Round
1985	Gordon Bradley	18–4–0	CAA Champions; NCAA 2nd Round
1986	Gordon Bradley	10–5–5	CAA Champions; NCAA 2nd Round
1987	Gordon Bradley	13–5–3	NCAA 1st Round
1988	Gordon Bradley	12–5–3	
1989	Gordon Bradley	11–7–3	CAA Champions; NCAA 1st Round
1990	Gordon Bradley	14–6–3	NCAA 1st Round
1991	Gordon Bradley	13–6–0	
1992	Gordon Bradley	12–5–3	
1993	Gordon Bradley	10–6–3	
1994	Gordon Bradley	6–12–2	
1995	Gordon Bradley	12–6–3	
1996	Gordon Bradley	14–6–3	NCAA 2nd Round
1997	Gordon Bradley	12–8–2	
1998	Gordon Bradley	13–7–0	
1999	Gordon Bradley	5–15–1	
2000	Gordon Bradley	8–10–1	
2001	Fran O'Leary	8–9–1	
2002	Fran O’Leary	8–7–4	
2003	Fran O’Leary	11–6–6	
2004	Fran O’Leary	7–11–1	
2005	Greg Andrulis	7–7–4	
2006	Greg Andrulis	12–6–3	NCAA 1st Round
2007	Greg Andrulis	5–11–3	
2008	Greg Andrulis	14–7–2	CAA Champions; NCAA 2nd Round
2009	Greg Andrulis	10–7–1	
2010	Greg Andrulis	8–7–2	
2011	Greg Andrulis	7–8–3	
2012	Greg Andrulis	11–6–2	
2013	Greg Andrulis	12–3–6	A–10 Champions; NCAA 2nd Round
2014	Greg Andrulis	11–4–5	
2015	Greg Andrulis	7–7–3	
2016	Greg Andrulis	2–12–2	
2017	Greg Andrulis	5–9–2	
2018	Greg Andrulis	9–8–0	
2019	Greg Andrulis	4–12–2	
2020	Elmar Bolowich	0–6–3	
2021	Elmar Bolowich	2–12–3	
2022	Rich Costanzo	2–11–2	
2023	Rich Costanzo	5–7–3	
2024	Rich Costanzo	13-4-2	
Totals		504–405–121	

=== NCAA tournament results ===
George Mason has appeared in 11 NCAA tournaments.

Year	Record	Seed	Region	Round	Opponent	Results
1982	18–1–0	N/A	Raleigh	Second round Quarterfinals	Indiana; Duke	W 1–0; L 0–2
1984	18–3–0	N/A	Charlottesville	First round	American	L 1–2
1985	17–3–0	N/A	Washington	First round Second round	Virginia; American	W 1–0; L 1–3
1986	9–4–5	N/A	Raleigh	First round Second round	Maryland; Loyola (MD)	W 2–1^{OT} L 0–2
1987	13–4–3	N/A	Baltimore	First round	Virginia	L 0–2
1989	11–6–3	N/A	Bloomington	First round	George Washington	L 1–3
1990	14–5–3	N/A	Evansville	First round	Saint Louis	L 0–1
1996	14–5–3	N/A	Williamsburg	First round Second round	Virginia; St. John's	W 1–0; L 1–2
2006	12–5–3	N/A	Charlottesville	First round	Bucknell	L 0–1^{OT}
2008	13–6–2	N/A	College Park	First round	Penn #2 Maryland	W 1–0; L 0–2
2013	12–3–6	N/A	Seattle	First round Second round	William & Mary #7 New Mexico	T 2–2^{2OT} (W 4–2 pen.); L 0–1
