= Jill Ellis =

Football coach and executive (born 1966)

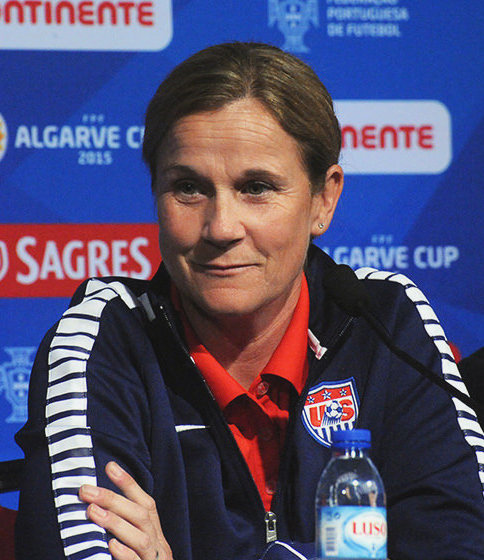
- Ellis at the Algarve Cup in March 2015

Personal information
- Full name: Jillian Anne Ellis
- Date of birth: 6 September 1966 (age 60)
- Place of birth: Folkestone, England
- Height: 5 ft 7 in (1.70 m)
- Position: Forward

Team information
- Current team: San Diego Wave FC (president)

Youth career
- 1981–1984: Robinson Rams
- –1984: Braddock Road Bluebelles

College career
Years	Team	Apps	(Gls)
1984–1987	William & Mary Tribe		(32)

Managerial career
- 1988–1990: NC State Wolfpack (assistant)
- 1994–1996: Maryland Terrapins (assistant)
- 1996–1997: Virginia Cavaliers (assistant)
- 1997–1998: Illinois Fighting Illini
- 1999–2010: UCLA Bruins
- 2000: United States U21
- 2005: United States U21
- 2007: United States U20
- 2008: United States (assistant)
- 2009–2010: United States U20
- 2011–2012: United States (assistant)
- 2012: United States (interim)
- 2014: United States (interim)
- 2014–2019: United States

Jillian Anne Ellis (born 6 September 1966) is an English-American football manager and executive. As of March 2026 she is chief football officer of FIFA, since her appointment in December 2024.

Ellis coached the United States women's national team from 2014 to 2019 and won two FIFA Women's World Cups in 2015 and 2019, making her the second coach to win consecutive World Cups after Vittorio Pozzo. She stepped down as the team's head coach in October 2019. Ellis was appointed president of San Diego Wave FC of the National Women's Soccer League (NWSL) after its expansion in 2021. She has served as an ambassador for the United States Soccer Federation, working to help raise the number of women in coaching, and has also served as head coach for various college and United States national youth teams over her career.

== Early life and education ==
Jillian Anne Ellis was born on 6 September 1966 in Folkestone, Kent, England. She grew up in Cowplain, a small village 11 mi (18 km) north of Portsmouth on the southern coast of England. She was a supporter of Manchester United, and attended Padnell Junior School and Cowplain School. Naturally athletic, she ran track and field, and played field hockey and netball, but did not play organised football as there was no organised football for girls in the UK in the 1970s. She would, however, tag along with her brother Paul and play with the boys whenever they needed an extra player.

Her father, John Ellis, a former Royal Marines commando, was a longtime football ambassador for the British Government, assigned to help create football programs worldwide, including in Trinidad and Tobago and in Singapore. He also served as an assistant coach for the U.S. women's national team in 2000 and 2001.

In 1981, the Ellis family moved to Northern Virginia, where John Ellis founded Soccer Academy in Manassas. Ellis captained the Robinson Secondary School team in Fairfax, Virginia, to the 1984 state championship, and won the under-19 national title with the Braddock Road Bluebelles the same summer. She went on to play as a forward at William & Mary from 1984 to 1987, when she was named third-team All-American. She scored 32 goals during her four seasons at the school.

Her brother Paul also became a football coach, coaching area high school teams and serving as an assistant coach at George Mason before taking a full-time position at Soccer Academy Inc.

Ellis earned a Bachelor of Arts degree in English literature and composition at the College of William and Mary in 1988. She also did work towards a master's degree in technical writing at North Carolina State University. Her mother Margaret was "horrified" on learning of her plan to give up her lucrative job as a technical writer at Northern Telecom to work as an assistant coach with subsistence pay, while her father advised her to "do something substantial" instead.

== Coaching and administrative career ==
Ellis has a United States Soccer Federation (USSF) Pro coaching licence; with coaching experiences that includes multiple stints for the under-20 and under-21 national teams, and an impressive record as a UCLA Bruins coach. She is the development director of the USSF. She served as assistant coach of the women's national team, head coach of a number of women youth teams, and was the interim coach of the senior women's national team in 2012, and for 2 matches in 2014. She was appointed the permanent head coach of United States women in May 2014.

=== College coaching ===
Ellis served as an assistant coach for three universities: at Maryland for three years, 1994–96; at Virginia for one year, 1996–97; and at NC State for another three years, 1988–90. As an assistant coach at N.C. State, Ellis helped the NC State secure the 1988 Atlantic Coast Conference title and an NCAA Women's College Cup appearance.

Ellis headed the Illinois women's program for two years from 1997 to 1998. In 1998, she brought the Fighting Illini to a 12–8 record and a first-ever Big Ten Tournament berth.

Ellis led UCLA to eight NCAA Women's College Cups, including seven in a row from 2003 to 2009, and won six straight Pacific-10 Conference titles from 2003 to 2008. She finished her time in Westwood with a record of 229 wins, 45 losses and 14 draws (229–45–14). She was the 2000 NSCAA National Coach of the Year after leading the Bruins to the NCAA championship game in just her second season as head coach.

Ellis has an all-time collegiate coaching record of 248 wins, 63 losses and 14 draws (248–63–14), compiled over 14 years with the Illinois Fighting Illini and UCLA Bruins.

=== National youth teams manager ===
Ellis was the head coach of the United States under-21 women's national football teams, coaching a team to win the Nordic Cup title at Germany 2000 and to Sweden's 2005 Nordic Cup. In another stint as youth team's head coach, she guided the U.S. under-20 women's national team to the CONCACAF title in 2010 and to the FIFA U-20 Women's World Cup in Germany.

=== National Development Director ===
Ellis was appointed by U.S. Soccer as development director for the U.S. women's national teams in January 2011. The appointment, along with April Heinrichs as Technical Director, marked the first time U.S. Soccer had appointed full-time positions to oversee the programs and development of national women's youth teams.

As development director, Ellis interacts directly with coaches within the youth club leagues and guides the U.S. under-17, under-15 and under-14 teams.

=== National team manager ===
Ellis was a scout for the U.S. women's national team at the Sydney 2000 Olympics, and while coach of the UCLA Bruins Ellis also served as an assistant coach under Pia Sundhage for the gold medal-winning U.S. women's national team at the Beijing 2008 Olympics.

==== 2012 interim coach ====
Following Sundhage's departure on 1 September 2012, for Sweden, Ellis (as women's national team program development director) served as the interim head coach until U.S. Soccer hired Tom Sermanni as the full-time head coach on 1 January 2013.

Ellis's first appearances as head coach of United States women's national team was against Germany, on 20 October 2012, at Bridgeview, Illinois, and on 23 October at Hartford, Connecticut. The international friendly matches were part of a series organized to celebrate the winning of the gold medal at the 2012 Olympics. The first match finished at 1–1 and the second at 2–2.

With a match against China on 15 December 2012, Ellis completed her first stint as interim head coach of U.S. women's national team with 5 wins, 2 draws, and no loss.

==== 2014 interim coach ====
On 6 April 2014, U.S. Soccer announced the firing of Tom Sermanni and re-appointment of Ellis as interim head coach of the U.S. women's national team. As interim head coach in 2014, Ellis had a 3–0 win against China and a 1–1 draw with Canada.

==== 2014 appointment as head coach ====
On 16 May 2014, U.S. Soccer announced that Ellis had been appointed as the national team's head coach on a permanent basis. Ellis's job as head coach was to qualify for the 2015 Women's World Cup and win the championship. On 5 July 2015, she coached the United States to a 5–2 victory over Japan to win the World Cup. Ellis was honored as 2015 FIFA World Coach of the Year for Women's Football on 11 January 2016.

According to an investigation, Ellis was one of the USWNT leaders who did not take action after being told of a "hostile [coaching] environment" in 2014, and receiving in 2015 a player survey with "quite disturbing" allegations including sexual harassment.

In 2016, the U.S. women's national team recorded five shutout wins to secure the 2016 CONCACAF Women's Olympic Qualifying Championship. However, the team struggled during the 2016 Summer Olympics, drawing against Colombia in the group stage and eliminated to eventual silver medal winners Sweden — a team led by former national team coach Pia Sundhage — 4–3 on penalty kicks after drawing in regulation and extra time. The loss marked the first time that the U.S. women's national team did not advance to the gold medal game of the Olympics, as well as the first time that the team failed to advance to the semifinal round of a major tournament. The effort was further marred when U.S. goalkeeper Hope Solo called the Swedish team "cowards" for their defensive tactics. Ellis would later cite those comments as part of the reason why U.S. Soccer terminated Solo's contract and suspended her from the team.

The U.S. women's national team won four subsequent international friendly matches (9–0 against Thailand, 3–1 against the Netherlands, and 4–0 and 5–1 in two matches against Switzerland). The latter two friendlies featured the largest squad turnover of Ellis's tenure as she brought in 11 uncapped players, started or played 6 of them, and left several regular players out of camp.

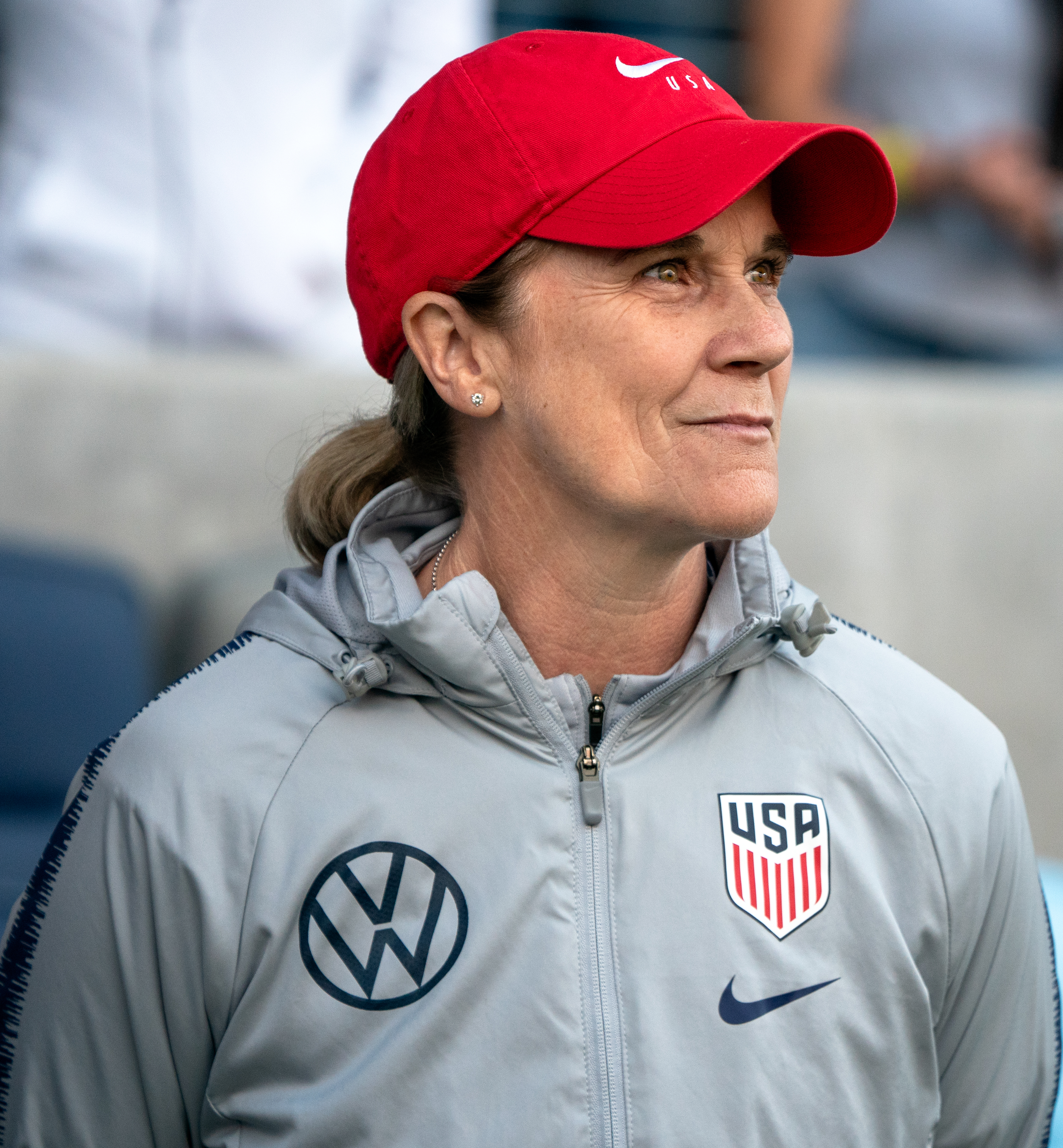
Ellis at a friendly against Portugal during the 2019 Victory Tour

Before the friendly against Thailand, Ellis asked U.S. women's national team midfielder Megan Rapinoe not to kneel during the pre-game performance of the United States national anthem. Rapinoe had done so before matches with her National Women's Soccer League team, Seattle Reign FC, prior to camp in support of other professional athletes' similar protests. Despite Ellis's request, she did not punish Rapinoe after the game.

On 7 July 2019 she led the United States Women's National Team to win its fourth World Cup and its second consecutive. In the final match against Netherlands in Lyon, France, the team won 2–0. The 2019 World Cup Champion Team beat the world record for most goals in a tournament with 26 goals. She became not only the first manager to win two Women's World Cup titles in history, but also the first national team coach, men's or women's, to have won two consecutive FIFA World Cup titles since Vittorio Pozzo guided Italy's men's national football team to two consecutive titles in both 1934 and 1938.

On 30 July 2019, U.S. Soccer announced that Ellis would be stepping down as coach of the Women's National Team. She remained with the team through the World Cup victory tour and continued to work with U.S. Soccer as an ambassador, working to help raise the number of women in coaching.

==== Coaching record ====
As of 6 October 2019

Team	Years	Matches	Won	Tied	Lost	Win %	Pts÷M	World Cup	Olympics
United States	2012 (interim), 2014–2019	132	106	19	7	87.5	2.55	2015 FIFA Women's World Cup 2019 FIFA Women's World Cup	5th

=== San Diego Wave FC president ===
In June 2021, the National Women's Soccer League announced that Ellis would be the president of San Diego Wave FC, an expansion team, before their inaugural season. Ron Burkle, the San Diego Wave's owner, reportedly reached out to Ellis for consulting work, but she stated she wanted "to run the whole damn thing." Ellis soon appointed Casey Stoney as the first head coach and Molly Downtain as the first general manager.

On 3 July 2024, Brittany Alvarado, a former employee of San Diego Wave, alleged that Ellis had engaged in "a pattern of abusive behavior" as president of the club. The Wave stated that the accusations were "categorically false," and labelled Alvarado's statements as "inaccurate and defamatory". On 29 July 2024, Ellis filed a lawsuit against Alvarado in California Superior Court, claiming defamation and intentional interference with contractual relations.

=== FIFA appointment ===
Ellis was appointed chief football officer of FIFA in December 2024. She serves as part of the executive management team, driving the development and implementation of FIFA's global football strategy. As of March 2026 she is still in the position.

== Personal life ==
In 2015 Ellis was living in Palmetto Bay, Florida, a suburb of Miami, with her wife Betsy Stephenson, whom she married in 2013, and their adopted daughter.

Ellis, along with her parents and brother, are naturalised American citizens.

== Honours ==
Ellis was Third-Team All-American in 1987 at College of William and Mary

She was awarded an honorary Doctor of Humane Letters degree in 2016, and was inducted into Omicron Delta Kappa as an alumni member at the College of William and Mary in 2019.

In June 2022, Ellis was an honoree of the Carnegie Corporation of New York's Great Immigrants Award.

== Managerial honours ==
Collegiate As assistant coach of NC State Wolfpack:

- 1988 Atlantic Coast Conference title

As head coach of UCLA Bruins:

- The 2000 NSCAA National Coach of the Year
- Six straight Pacific-10 Conference titles from 2003 to 2008

United States Women

As coach of youth teams:

- Nordic Cup title at Germany 2000 under-21 tournament
- 2010 under-20 CONCACAF title

As assistant coach of senior team:

- Beijing 2008 Olympic Gold medal

As head coach of senior team:

- 2014 CONCACAF Women's Championship (1st place)
- 2015 Algarve Cup (1st place)
- FIFA Women's World Cup: 2015, 2019
- 2015 CONCACAF Women's Coach of the Year
- 2015, 2019 FIFA World Women's Coach of the Year

== See also ==
- Vittorio Pozzo, the first manager to win FIFA World Cup consecutively while coaching the same team.
- 2010 FIFA U-20 Women's World Cup squads
- 2014 CONCACAF Women's Championship squads
