= Al Albert =

Al Albert may refer to:

- Al Albert (soccer) (born 1949), American college soccer coach
- Al Albert (sportscaster), American basketball sportscaster
- Giampiero Albertini (1927–1991), sometimes credited as Al Albert, Italian actor
- Al Alberts (1922–2009), American singer and composer
