= Bret Myers =

American soccer player

Personal information
- Date of birth: April 1, 1980 (age 46)
- Place of birth: Richmond, Virginia, US
- Height: 5 ft 11 in (1.80 m)
- Position: Midfielder

Youth career
- Williamsburg Wizards

College career
Years	Team	Apps	(Gls)
- Richmond Spiders

Senior career*
Years	Team	Apps	(Gls)
2002–2003	Richmond Kickers	7	(0)
- * Club domestic league appearances and goals

Bret Myers (born April 1, 1980) is an American former soccer player and current professor. Myers played with the Williamsburg Wizards youth travel team, with the University of Richmond, and with the Richmond Kickers. He won a gold medal with Team USA at the 11th Pan American Maccabi Games in 2008. He is a professor at Villanova University, and an analytics consultant for Major League Soccer's Columbus Crew.

== Early life and education ==
Myers, a native of Richmond, Virginia, is the son of Dr. Thomas and Carolyn Myers, and is Jewish. Myers grew up attending the Beth Ahabah Temple, in Richmond. He attended Collegiate School in Richmond ('98).

He attended the University of Richmond (Robins School of Business, BS, Business Administration, Management and Operations '02). Myers also attended the University of Virginia (MS, Systems Engineering, '06) and Drexel University's Bennett S. LeBow College of Business (PhD, Decision Sciences, '09).

== Soccer career ==
Myers played with the Williamsburg Wizards soccer travel club, coached by Al Albert, before enrolling in college.

He played forward in soccer at the University of Richmond. Myers was honored as a 2000 National Soccer Coaches Association of America scholar-athlete regional honoree, and was named Atlantic 10 Academic All-Conference. As of 2006, he was 6th on the Spider men's soccer career assist list, with 21, as he also scored 15 goals.

Myers played soccer for two seasons with the Richmond Kickers, from 2002 to 2003.

He won a gold medal with Team USA at the 11th Pan American Maccabi Games in Buenos Aires, Argentina, in 2008.

== Later life ==
Myers is a professor at Villanova University in Philadelphia, Pennsylvania, where he teaches business statistics. He is also an analytics consultant for Major League Soccer's Columbus Crew.

His wife Jill is a former field hockey player, and coach at the University of Richmond.
