= John Daly (soccer coach) =

Current position
- Title: Head coach

Biographical details
- Born: London, England

Coaching career (HC unless noted)
- 1987–2017: William & Mary women

Head coaching record
- Overall: Overall: 413–176–57 (.683); CAA: 156–45–18 (.753)

Accomplishments and honors

Championships
- 10× CAA Tournament Championship (1993, 1994, 1996–2001, 2003, 2011); 12× CAA Regular Season Championship (1993, 1994, 1996–2001, 2003, 2011–2012, 2015); 22× NCAA Division I Tournament Appearances (1987–1990, 1992–2004, 2006–2008, 2011, 2015); 30 consecutive winning seasons (1987–2016)

Awards
- 5× CAA Coach of the Year (1993, 1994, 1999, 2006, 2011); 7× Mid-Atlantic Coach of the Year (1989, 1990, 1992, 1997, 1999, 2006, 2011); 5× Virginia Coach of the Year (1994, 1998, 1999, 2002, 2006); NSCAA Women's Committee Award of Excellence (2010); NSCAA Letter of Commendation 2017)

John Daly is an English American former college soccer coach of Irish descent. He was the head coach of the College of William and Mary women's soccer program from 1987 through 2017.

== Early career ==
Born in London to Irish parents, Daly attended London Oratory School and played for the Rugby Youth Club in North Kensington where he represented the club in football (soccer), cricket, swimming, athletics, cycling and cross country as a boy. He went on to play football for Copyc FC, Norland Rovers, South Vale Glacier and Hillingdon British Legion before taking up coaching. He began his coaching career in London. With certification from the FA, he coached and played for St. Thomas Youth Club in Fulham. He later moved to the United States, where he worked at soccer camps across the country run by the United States Military Academy.

== William & Mary ==
Daly came to William & Mary in 1979 and initially worked as an assistant coach for the women's team, which was a club team until 1981. He was also an assistant coach for the men's team under Al Albert. He became a full-time assistant coach for the women's team in 1986 under John Charles, before succeeding Charles in 1987. As head women's soccer coach, Daly has made the W&M program into the most successful in the Colonial Athletic Association, claiming ten conference tournament titles and eleven regular season titles. The team has had a winning season every year of his tenure, making William & Mary the only program to have a winning season in all 36 years of NCAA women's soccer, along with North Carolina, the most successful school in the sport.

Daly has led the Tribe to 22 appearances in the NCAA tournament, advancing as far as the third round in 1997 and 1998. Fourteen of his players have been awarded All-American honors.

With a total record of 405wins, 166 losses, and 55 draws (to 2016), Daly is the winningest coach in school history, and the ninth coach in the history of Division I women's soccer to achieve 400 wins; only Anson Dorrance (North Carolina), Len Tsantiris (Connecticut), and Jerry Smith (Santa Clara) have done the same at one school. In 2004, the College opened Albert-Daly Field, a soccer and lacrosse stadium named after Al Albert and Daly.

== Awards and honors ==
=== Team ===
- CAA Tournament Championship: 1993, 1994, 1996, 1997, 1998, 1999, 2000, 2003, 2011
- CAA Regular Season Championship: 1993, 1994, 1996, 1997, 1998, 1999, 2000, 2001, 2003, 2011, 2012
- NCAA Division I Tournament Appearance: 1987, 1988, 1989, 1990, 1992, 1993, 1994, 1995, 1996, 1997, 1998, 1999, 2000, 2001, 2002, 2003, 2004, 2006, 2007, 2008, 2011, 2015
- 30 consecutive winning seasons: 1987–2016

=== Personal ===
- CAA Coach of the Year: 1993, 1994, 1999, 2006, and 2011
- Mid-Atlantic Coach of the Year: 1989, 1990, 1992, 1997, 1999, 2006, and 2011
- Virginia Coach of the Year: 1994, 1998, 1999, 2002, and 2006
- NSCAA Women's Committee Award of Excellence: 2010

== Personal life ==
Daly became a naturalized American citizen in 2000. He is an Arsenal supporter, and particularly admires Thierry Henry and Lionel Messi as players.

== See also ==
- List of college women's soccer coaches with 300 wins
- William & Mary Tribe women's soccer, 1981–1989
