= 1968 Maryland Terrapins men's soccer team =

19698 Maryland Terrapins men's soccer team

1968 Maryland Terrapins men's soccer

NCAA Co-Champions

ACC Champions
- Conference: Atlantic Coast Conference
- Record: 14–0–1 (5–0–0 ACC)
- Head coach: Doyle Royal (23rd season)
- Assistant coach: Ron Hoch (3rd season)
- Captain: Mario Jelencovich
- Home stadium: Riverdale Park

1968 Atlantic Coast Conference men's soccer standings
| | Conf. | | | | | | Overall |
| Team | W | | L | | T | PCT | W | | L | | T | PCT |
|---|---|---|---|---|---|---|---|---|---|---|---|---|
| Maryland ‍†‍‍^{y} | 5 | – | 0 | – | 0 | 1.000 | 14 | – | 0 | – | 1 | .967 |
| North Carolina ‍‍‍^{y} | 3 | – | 2 | – | 0 | .600 | 8 | – | 3 | – | 0 | .727 |
| NC State ‍‍‍ | 2 | – | 3 | – | 0 | .400 | 6 | – | 3 | – | 1 | .650 |
| Duke ‍‍‍ | 2 | – | 3 | – | 0 | .400 | 6 | – | 4 | – | 0 | .600 |
| Clemson ‍‍‍ | 1 | – | 3 | – | 1 | .300 | 9 | – | 3 | – | 1 | .731 |
| Virginia ‍‍‍ | 1 | – | 3 | – | 1 | .300 | 4 | – | 5 | – | 1 | .450 |
† – Conference champion y – Invited to the NCAA Tournament

The 1968 Maryland Terrapins men's soccer team represented the University of Maryland, College Park during the 1968 NCAA soccer season. It was the program's 23rd season of existence and their 20th season in the Atlantic Coast Conference.

The 1968 season was the first season where the Maryland Terrapins men's soccer program claimed an NCAA Division I Men's Soccer Championship, earning co-champion honors with Michigan State. The Terrapins were led by freshman Rocco Morelli, who scored a season-record 20 goals for the Terrapins. Since the 2017 season, it has been the most goals an individual has posted in a college soccer season. Morelli also led the team with 46 total points, which remained the most points per individual in a season until Jason Garey broke the record in 2004. Midfielder, Larry Ruhs led Maryland in assists on the season, tallying seven total assists.

At the time, it was the Terps third ever season where they finished undefeated, and their first since 1958. To date, it is the most recent season where Maryland finished a season undefeated.

== Roster ==
Note: Flags indicate national team as defined under FIFA eligibility rules; some limited exceptions apply. Players may hold more than one non-FIFA nationality.

| No. | Pos. | Nation | Player |
|---|---|---|---|
| — | DF | USA | Les Bernard |
| — | FW | BRA | Alvaro Bitencourt |
| — | DF | ITA | Giancarlo Brandoni |
| — | DF | USA | Jerry Chareczko |
| — | MF | USA | Bob Connor |
| — | DF | ITA | Frank Delvecchio |
| — | MF | USA | Jack Gordon |
| — | MF | USA | Jack Gruszka |
| — | GK | YUG | Mario Jelencovich |
| — | DF | SCO | Peter Lowry |
| — | MF | USA | Tom Michel |
| — | FW | ITA | Rocco Morelli |

| No. | Pos. | Nation | Player |
|---|---|---|---|
| — | DF | USA | Carlos Naudon |
| — | MF | USA | Ted Nykeil |
| — | GK | USA | Jim Richardson |
| — | FW | USA | Manuel Romero |
| — | MF | USA | Larry Ruhs |
| — | MF | USA | Steve Salfeety |
| — | FW | USA | Frank Schoon |
| — | FW | TUR | Melih Sensoy |
| — | DF | ENG | Robert Singleton |
| — | MF | USA | Paul Stiehl |
| — | DF | USA | Emerson Treffer |
| — | FW | ENG | Gary Wallace |
| — | FW | USA | Bo White |

== Schedule ==
| Date Time, TV | Rank^{#} | Opponent^{#} | Result | Record | Site (Attendance) City, State |
Regular season
| 10/02/1968* | | at Howard | W 3–2 | 1–0–0 | William H. Greene Stadium; Washington, D.C. |
| 10/05/1968 | | at Clemson | W 3–1 | 2–0–0 (1–0–0) | Riggs Field; Clemson, South Carolina |
| 10/07/1968 | | at NC State | W 6–1 | 3–0–0 (2–0–0) | Miller Field; Raleigh, North Carolina |
| 10/11/1968* | | George Washington | W 10–1 | 4–0–0 | UMD Soccer Field; College Park, Maryland |
| 10/16/1968* | | at Catholic | W 2–1 | 5–0–0 | Brookland Stadium; Washington, D.C. |
| 10/23/1968* | | Navy | W 2–1 ^{OT} | 6–0–0 | UMD Soccer Field (1,000); College Park, Maryland |
| 10/26/1968* | | at Georgetown | W 1–0 | 7–0–0 | Duke Ellington Track and Field; Washington, D.C. |
| 10/29/1968 | | at Virginia; Rivalry | W 5–0 | 8–0–0 (3–0–0) | UVA Soccer Field; Charlottesville, Virginia |
| 11/02/1968* | | Penn State | W 6–0 | 9–0–0 | UMD Soccer Field; College Park, Maryland |
| 11/09/1968 | | Duke | W 4–0 | 10–0–0 (4–0–0) | UMD Soccer Field; College Park, Maryland |
| 11/09/1968 | | North Carolina | W 3–1 | 11–0–0 (5–0–0) | UMD Soccer Field; College Park, Maryland |
NCAA Tournament
| 11/22/1968* | | Saint Louis; Second Round | W 3–1 | 12–0–0 | Byrd Stadium (8,500); College Park, Maryland |
| 11/30/1968* | | Hartwick; Quarterfinals | W 2–1 | 13–0–0 | UMD Soccer Field; College Park, Maryland |
| 12/05/1968* | | vs. San Jose State; Semifinals | W 4–3 ^{OT} | 14–0–0 | Atlanta–Fulton County Stadium; Atlanta, Georgia |
| 12/07/1968* | | vs. Michigan State; National Championship | T 2–2 ^{OT} | 14–0–1 | Atlanta–Fulton County Stadium; Atlanta, Georgia |

== Statistics ==
=== Points leaders ===
Two points per goal, and one point per assist.

| Place | Name | Goals | Assists | Points |
|---|---|---|---|---|
| 1 | Rocco Morelli | 20 | 6 | 46 |
| 2 | Larry Ruhs | 11 | 7 | 29 |
| 3 | Jerry Chareczko | 12 | 4 | 28 |
| 4 | Frank Schoon | 6 | 5 | 17 |
| 5 | Alvaro Bitencourt | 1 | 6 | 8 |
| 6 | Les Bernard | 1 | 3 | 5 |
| 6 | Bo White | 1 | 3 | 5 |
| 8 | Frank Delvecchio | 1 | 1 | 3 |
| 9 | Bob Connor | 1 | 0 | 2 |
| 9 | Jack Gordon | 1 | 0 | 2 |
| 9 | Manuel Romero | 1 | 0 | 2 |
| 12 | Giancarlo Brandoni | 0 | 1 | 1 |
| 12 | Melih Sensoy | 0 | 1 | 1 |
