= 1968 Michigan State Spartans men's soccer team =

Michigan State 1968 soccer season

1968 Michigan State Spartans men's soccer

National co-champions

NCAA Tournament, College Cup vs. Maryland, T 2–2
- Conference: Independent
- Record: 11–1–3
- Head coach: Gene Kenney (13th season)
- Home stadium: Old College Field

The 1968 Michigan State Spartans men's soccer team represented Michigan State University during the 1968 NCAA soccer season. The Spartans played at Spartan Stadium in East Lansing, Michigan and were coached by 13th-year head coach, Gene Kenney. The Spartans competed as an independent.

The 1968 season was one of the most successful season in program history, as they were declared NCAA co-champions along with the Maryland Terrapins, making it one of two seasons the Spartans won the NCAA title in men's soccer. The team was considered to be part of the 1960s golden age of Michigan State sports, where their wrestling and football teams also won national titles during that time.

== Schedule ==
Date Time, TV	Rank^{#}	Opponent^{#}	Result	Record	Site City, State
Regular season
NCAA Tournament
November 23, 1968		at Akron; First round	W 1–0 ^{OT}	10–1–1	Lee R. Jackson Field (1,200); Akron, OH
November 30, 1968*		at West Chester; Quarterfinals	T 2–2 ^{PK}	10–1–2	WCU Soccer Field (2,000); West Chester, PA
December 5, 1968*		vs. Brown; Semifinals	W 2–0	11–1–2	Atlanta–Fulton County Stadium (3,500); Atlanta, GA
December 7, 1968*		vs. Maryland; National Championship	T 2–2 ^{OT}	11–1–3	Atlanta–Fulton County Stadium (4,000); Atlanta, GA
*Non-conference game. ^{#}Rankings from United Soccer Coaches. (#) Tournament seedings in parentheses.
