= Maryland–Virginia men's soccer rivalry =

Rivalry between the UMD Terrapins and the UVA Cavaliers

Maryland-Virginia men's soccer rivalry
- Maryland Terrapins Virginia Cavaliers
- Sport: College soccer
- First meeting: October 8, 1941; Maryland 12, Virginia 0
- Latest meeting: September 4, 2023; Virginia 2, Maryland 1
- Next meeting: September 2024

Statistics
- Total meetings: 85
- All-time series: Maryland, 44–31–10
- Largest victory: Maryland 12–0 Virginia (1941)
- Longest win streak: 20, Maryland (1941–1969)
- Longest unbeaten streak: 23, Maryland (1941–1971)
- Current win streak: 1, Virginia (2023–)
- Current unbeaten streak: 1, Virginia (2023–)

The Maryland–Virginia men's soccer rivalry, sometimes referred to as the Tydings Cup (Note: The name Tydings Cup referred to the named of the trophy received by the winning team of the American football rivalry from the 1920s until 1945.), is a rivalry between the University of Maryland Terrapins men's soccer team, and the University of Virginia Cavaliers men's soccer team. When both teams competed in the Atlantic Coast Conference, the rivalry was considered one of the most intense college soccer rivalries in the United States. Much of this is due to the program's long-standing rivalries across other sports and competing for recruits in the Mid-Atlantic, as both programs participated in the ACC for over 60 years before Maryland left for the Big Ten Conference.

Both UVA and Maryland have NCAA Championship programs in men's soccer. The Cavaliers have won seven NCAA Championships (1989, 1991, 1992, 1993, 1994, 2009, 2014) while the Terrapins have won four (1968, 2005, 2008, 2018). Both programs are also extremely consistent. As of 2019, Virginia has made the College Cup Tournament bracket an NCAA record 39 consecutive years. Maryland has made the tournament 19 consecutive years since 2001.

Virginia is 29–16–7 in the rivalry since 1978, but Maryland started 26–1–3 between 1941 and 1977, and still leads 42–30–10 overall. The programs are coached by two of the most reputable coaches in the collegiate game who have both coached their respective programs for over 20 years. The Cavaliers are coached by George Gelnovatch while the Terrapins are coached by Sasho Cirovski.

== Rivalry ==
=== History ===
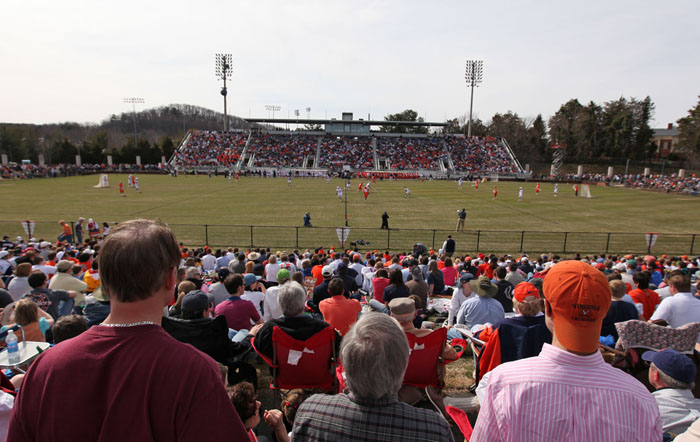
Klöckner Stadium, the home ground of Virginia.

The origins of both programs begin in the early to mid-1940s. In 1941, Virginia began sponsoring a varsity men's soccer program, while Maryland followed suit in 1946. Prior to the 1946 meeting, Virginia's varsity team played Maryland's club team in the early 1940s in season fixtures. The first recorded meeting between both teams was on October 8, 1941 where the Maryland club team defeated the Virginia varsity team, 12-0, making it the largest defeat by either team in the series. The first meeting between the two sides as varsity programs was on October 25, 1947, where Maryland defeated Virginia 3-0.

The two teams met infrequently through the remainder of the 1940s into the mid-1950s. In 1955, the Atlantic Coast Conference began sponsoring men's college soccer as a conference sport, in which both Maryland and Virginia joined, thus causing the two teams to meet on an annual basis for the next half-century. The specific origins of the rivalry from this point are unknown, but much of it became rooted in the proximity between the two schools, and the fact Virginia and Maryland are border states.

The rivalry between both schools did not escalate until well into the 21st century, primarily due to the fact the school's until then saw periods of success on the pitch at different times. Maryland, for instance, saw much success in the NCAA Division I Men's Soccer Tournament, including a national title in the mid-to-late 1960s, whereas Virginia only qualified for one NCAA Tournament during that time. Conversely, Virginia saw much of their success come under Bruce Arena during their five-peat run in the late-1980s to mid-1990s. However, from 1976 to 1994, Maryland only qualified once for the NCAA Tournament.

In the late 1990s, the rivalry intensified with both teams regularly jockeying for ACC supremacy, which, at the time, was one of the top college conferences in the sport. This was due to the amount of national championships won, and at-large berths received in comparison to other collegiate conferences. Additionally, the rivalry intensified as both schools often tried to attract the top high school talents in the Mid-Atlantic region. Throughout the 2000s, the teams were both regularly ranked in the Top-10 of the NSCAA polls. Also during this team, Maryland's Sasho Cirovski and Virginia's George Gelnovatch were established as some of the most elite collegiate coaches in the United States. This was emphasized with Cirovski's National Coach of the Year Award in 2005, as well as both Cirovski and Gelnovatch's ACC Coach of the Year Awards earned throughout the late 1990s into the early 2000s. Additionally, during this time, three of the ten national championships in the 2000s were won by either Maryland or Virginia. Maryland won the NCAA title in 2005 and again in 2008. The following year, Virginia won the 2009 title. Furthermore, during the 2000s either one of the teams reached the College Cup (Final Four) eight of the 10 occasions. In 2011, College Soccer News rated the rivalry as the third most intense in the nation.

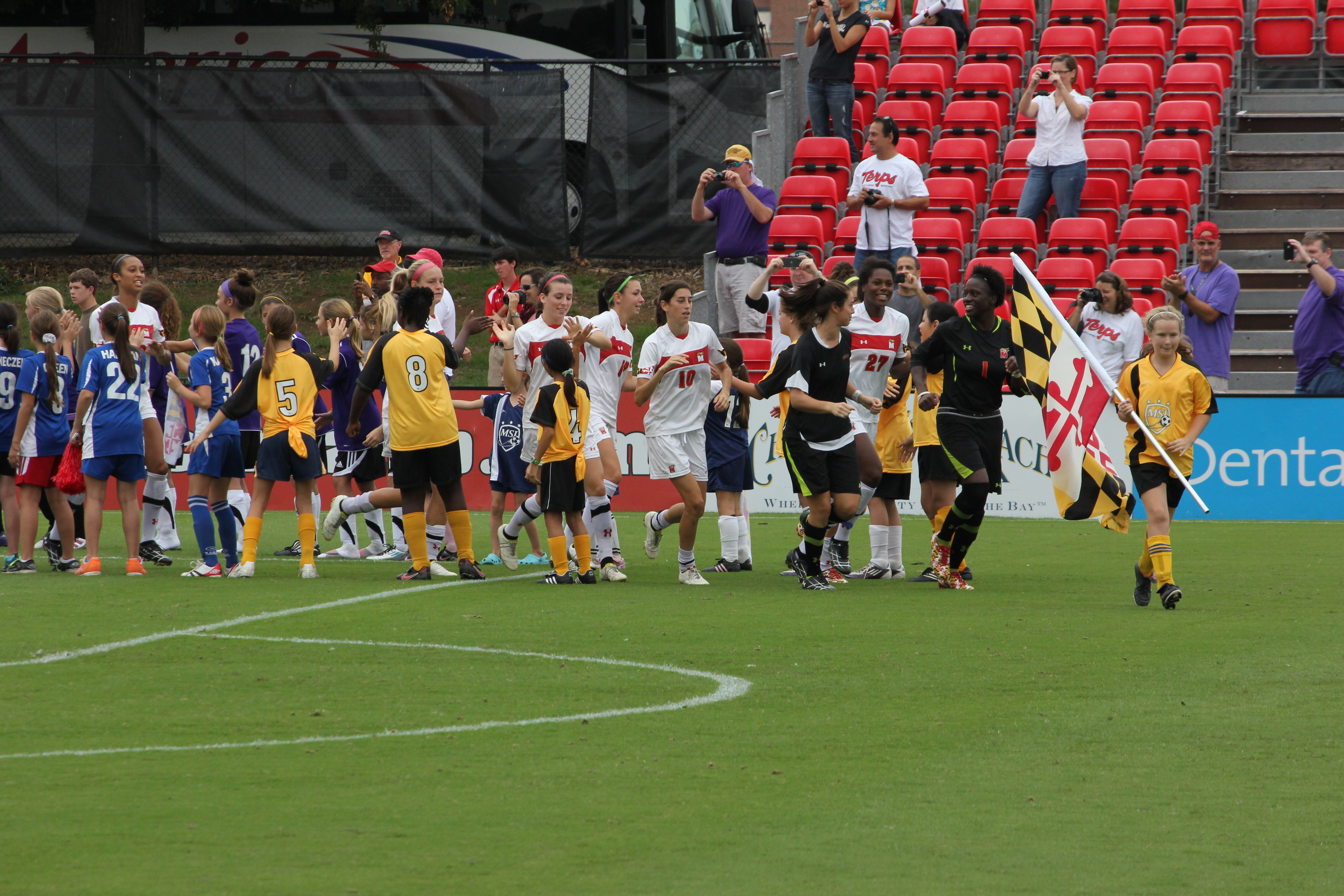
Ludwig Field, the home ground of Maryland.

The general Maryland-Virginia rivalry has become less intense since Maryland moved to the Big Ten Conference during the 2010–2014 NCAA conference realignment, causing the teams to no longer meet in any sport on a regular basis.

The final match between the two sides as ACC teams came in 2013, when the programs met in the College Cup, or Final Four, of the 2013 NCAA Division I Men's Soccer Championship. Ahead of the match, Maryland's head coach, Sasho Cirovski praised the rivalry calling it "a dream scenario." Cirovski ahead of the clash emphasized how large the rivalry is in college soccer: "I’ve said it a thousand times: It’s the best rivalry in college soccer." The American soccer publication, Soccer America called it the "end of one of college soccer's great rivalries".

The two sides met for the first time since Maryland's departure on November 22, 2015 in the 2015 NCAA Division I Men's Soccer Championship. There, Maryland posted a 1-0 victory thanks to a 38th-minute goal from Eryk Williamson. Maryland and Virginia later scheduled their first regular-season match as non-conference opponents on September 3, 2018, which ended in a scoreless draw at Audi Field in Washington.

== Results ==
Maryland win Draw Virginia win Rankings from the Soccer America poll

Competition	Date	Home team	Result	Away team	Venue	Attendance	Recap	Series
1941 ISFA season	October 8, 1941	Maryland	12–0	Virginia	Old Byrd Stadium, College Park, Maryland			UMD 1–0–0
1947 ISFA season	October 25, 1947	Virginia	0–3	Maryland	Scott Stadium, Charlottesville, Virginia			UMD 2–0–0
1948 ISFA season	November 17, 1948	Maryland	5–0	Virginia	Griffith Stadium, Washington, D.C.			UMD 3–0–0
1949 ISFA season	October 14, 1949	Virginia	1–10	Maryland	Scott Stadium, Charlottesville, Virginia			UMD 4–0–0
1950 ISFA season	October 20, 1950	Maryland	3–1	Virginia	Byrd Stadium, College Park, Maryland			UMD 5–0–0
1954 ACC season	November 19, 1954	Virginia	0–7	Maryland	Scott Stadium, Charlottesville, Virginia			UMD 6–0–0
1955 ACC season	November 18, 1955	Maryland	3–0	Virginia	Byrd Stadium, College Park, Maryland			UMD 7–0–0
1956 ACC season	November 13, 1956	Virginia	0–2	Maryland	Scott Stadium, Charlottesville, Virginia			UMD 8–0–0
1957 ACC season	October 25, 1957	Maryland	2–0	Virginia	Byrd Stadium, College Park, Maryland			UMD 9–0–0
1958 ACC season	October 28, 1958	Virginia	1–2	Maryland	Scott Stadium, Charlottesville, Virginia			UMD 10–0–0
1959 ACC season	October 30, 1959	Maryland	5–1	Virginia	Byrd Stadium, College Park, Maryland			UMD 11–0–0
1960 ACC season	October 7, 1960	Virginia	1–4	Maryland	Scott Stadium, Charlottesville, Virginia			UMD 12–0–0
1961 ACC season	October 6, 1961	Maryland	3–0	Virginia	Byrd Stadium, College Park, Maryland			UMD 13–0–0
1962 ACC season	October 26, 1962	Virginia	2–3	Maryland	Scott Stadium, Charlottesville, Virginia			UMD 14–0–0
1963 ACC season	October 23, 1963	Maryland	7–2	Virginia	Byrd Stadium, College Park, Maryland			UMD 15–0–0
1964 ACC season	October 22, 1964	Virginia	0–2	Maryland	Scott Stadium, Charlottesville, Virginia			UMD 16–0–0
1965 ACC season	November 5, 1965	Maryland	2–0	Virginia	Byrd Stadium, College Park, Maryland			UMD 17–0–0
1966 ACC season	November 10, 1966	Virginia	1–5	Maryland	Scott Stadium, Charlottesville, Virginia			UMD 18–0–0
1967 ACC season	October 9, 1967	Maryland	4–0	Virginia	Byrd Stadium, College Park, Maryland			UMD 19–0–0
1968 ACC season	October 29, 1968	Virginia	0–5	Maryland	Scott Stadium, Charlottesville, Virginia			UMD 20–0–0
1969 ACC season	October 28, 1969	Maryland	2–2	Virginia	Byrd Stadium, College Park, Maryland			UMD 20–0–1
1969 NCAA Tournament	November 17, 1969	Maryland	5–0	Virginia	Byrd Stadium, College Park, Maryland			UMD 21–0–1
1970 ACC season	October 18, 1970	Virginia	2–3	Maryland	Scott Stadium, Charlottesville, Virginia			UMD 22–0–1
1971 ACC season	October 13, 1971	Maryland	1–2	Virginia	Byrd Stadium, College Park, Maryland			UMD 22–1–1
1972 ACC season	October 15, 1972	Virginia	1–1	Maryland	Scott Stadium, Charlottesville, Virginia			UMD 22–1–2
1973 ACC season	October 5, 1973	Maryland	3–1	Virginia	Byrd Stadium, College Park, Maryland			UMD 23–1–2
1974 ACC season	October 4, 1974	Virginia	0–1	Maryland	Scott Stadium, Charlottesville, Virginia			UMD 24–1–2
1975 ACC season	October 25, 1975	Maryland	6–1	Virginia	Byrd Stadium, College Park, Maryland			UMD 25–1–2
1976 ACC season	October 23, 1976	Virginia	2–2	Maryland	Scott Stadium, Charlottesville, Virginia			UMD 25–1–3
1977 ACC season	October 22, 1977	Maryland	4–2	Virginia	Byrd Stadium, College Park, Maryland			UMD 26–1–3
1978 ACC season	November 11, 1978	Virginia	3–1	Maryland	Scott Stadium, Charlottesville, Virginia			UMD 26–2–3
1979 ACC season	September 15, 1979	Maryland	0–1	Virginia	Byrd Stadium, College Park, Maryland			UMD 26–3–3
1980 ACC season	September 12, 1980	Virginia	2–1	Maryland	Scott Stadium, Charlottesville, Virginia			UMD 26–4–3
1981 ACC season	September 12, 1981	Maryland	0–1	Virginia	Byrd Stadium, College Park, Maryland			UMD 26–5–3
1982 ACC season	September 25, 1982	#4 Virginia	2–1	Maryland	Scott Stadium, Charlottesville, Virginia			UMD 26–6–3
1983 ACC season	September 25, 1983	Maryland	1–4	Virginia	Byrd Stadium, College Park, Maryland			UMD 26–7–3
1984 ACC season	September 22, 1984	#11 Virginia	8–1	Maryland	Scott Stadium, Charlottesville, Virginia			UMD 26–8–3
1985 ACC season	September 22, 1985	Maryland	0–2	#1 Virginia	Byrd Stadium, College Park, Maryland			UMD 26–9–3
1986 ACC season	September 21, 1986	#11 Virginia	1–0	#16 Maryland	Scott Stadium, Charlottesville, Virginia			UMD 26–10–3
1987 ACC season	September 20, 1987	#20 Maryland	0–1	#4 Virginia	Byrd Stadium, College Park, Maryland			UMD 26–11–3
1988 ACC season	September 18, 1988	#2 Virginia	2–1	Maryland	Scott Stadium, Charlottesville, Virginia			UMD 26–12–3
1989 ACC season	September 17, 1989	Maryland	1–4	#1 Virginia	Byrd Stadium, College Park, Maryland			UMD 26–13–3
1990 ACC season	September 16, 1990	#7 Virginia	0–1	Maryland	Scott Stadium, Charlottesville, Virginia			UMD 27–13–3
1991 ACC season	September 15, 1991	Maryland	0–3	#3 Virginia	Byrd Stadium, College Park, Maryland			UMD 27–14–3
1992 ACC season	September 13, 1992	#1 Virginia	5–1	Maryland	Klöckner Stadium, Charlottesville, Virginia			UMD 27–15–3
1993 ACC season	September 12, 1993	Maryland	0–1	#1 Virginia	Byrd Stadium, College Park, Maryland			UMD 27–16–3
1994 ACC season	September 11, 1994	#1 Virginia	4–2	Maryland	Klöckner Stadium, Charlottesville, Virginia			UMD 27–17–3
1994 NCAA Tournament	November 27, 1994	#4 Virginia	2–1	Maryland	Klöckner Stadium, Charlottesville, Virginia			UMD 27–18–3
1995 ACC season	September 12, 1995	#5 Maryland	2–2	#1 Virginia	Ludwig Field, College Park, Maryland			UMD 27–18–4
1996 ACC season	September 15, 1996	#5 Virginia	1–1	Maryland	Klöckner Stadium, Charlottesville, Virginia			UMD 27–18–5
1996 ACC Tournament	November 17, 1996	#1 Virginia	0–2	Maryland	Klöckner Stadium, Charlottesville, Virginia			UMD 28–18–5
1997 ACC season	September 13, 1997	#2 Maryland	0–0	#11 Virginia	Ludwig Field, College Park, Maryland			UMD 28–18–6
1997 ACC Tournament	November 16, 1997	#8 Virginia	2–0	#11 Maryland	Disney's Wide World of Sports Complex, Orlando, Florida			UMD 28–19–6
1998 ACC season	September 12, 1998	#7 Virginia	4–1	#17 Maryland	Klöckner Stadium, Charlottesville, Virginia		Recap	UMD 28–20–6
1999 ACC season	October 12, 1999	#4 Maryland	1–0	#17 Virginia	Ludwig Field, College Park, Maryland	2,034	Recap	UMD 29–20–6
1999 ACC Tournament	November 11, 1999	Virginia	2–0	#5 Maryland	Spry Stadium, Winston-Salem, North Carolina	2,201	Recap	UMD 29–21–6
2000 ACC season	November 3, 2000	#10 Virginia	2–0	Maryland	Klöckner Stadium, Charlottesville, Virginia	3,096	Recap	UMD 29–22–6
2001 ACC season	November 4, 2001	Maryland	0–3	#2 Virginia	Ludwig Field, College Park, Maryland	1,673	Recap	UMD 29–23–6
2002 ACC season	November 1, 2002	#20 Virginia	1–0	#5 Maryland	Klöckner Stadium, Charlottesville, Virginia	2,474	Recap	UMD 29–24–6
2002 ACC Tournament	November 17, 2002	#10 Maryland	3–0	#11 Virginia	SAS Stadium, Cary, North Carolina	1,822	Recap	UMD 30–24–6
2003 ACC season	October 31, 2003	#3 Maryland	1–0	Virginia	Ludwig Field, College Park, Maryland	2,245	Recap	UMD 31–24–6
2003 ACC Tournament	November 16, 2003	#2 Maryland	1–1	Virginia	SAS Stadium, Cary, North Carolina	3,287	Recap	UMD 31–24–7
2004 ACC season	November 5, 2004	#9 Virginia	0–1	#12 Maryland	Klöckner Stadium, Charlottesville, Virginia	4,081	Recap	UMD 32–24–7
2004 ACC Tournament	November 14, 2004	#5 Maryland	1–2	#11 Virginia	SAS Stadium, Cary, North Carolina	3,841	Recap	UMD 32–25–7
2005 ACC season	October 19, 2005	#8(t) Maryland	3–0	#8(t) Virginia	Ludwig Field, College Park, Maryland	2,567	Recap	UMD 33–25–7
2006 ACC season	October 11, 2006	#4 Virginia	3–0	#2 Maryland	Klöckner Stadium, Charlottesville, Virginia	3,618	Recap	UMD 33–26–7
2007 ACC season	November 3, 2007	#25 Maryland	4–1	#14 Virginia	Ludwig Field, College Park, Maryland	3,267	Recap	UMD 34–26–7
2008 ACC season	October 31, 2008	Virginia	1–2	#4 Maryland	Klöckner Stadium, Charlottesville, Virginia	1,737	Recap	UMD 35–26–7
2008 ACC Tournament	November 16, 2008	#4 Maryland	1–0	Virginia	WakeMed Soccer Park, Cary, North Carolina	1,513	Recap	UMD 36–26–7
2009 ACC season	October 31, 2009	#5 Maryland	0–0	#6 Virginia	Ludwig Field, College Park, Maryland	1,112	Recap	UMD 36–26–8
2009 ACC Tournament	November 11, 2009	#5 Maryland	0–1	#6 Virginia	WakeMed Soccer Park, Cary, North Carolina	4,302	Recap	UMD 36–27–8
2009 NCAA Tournament	December 3, 2009	#2 Virginia	3–0	#13 Maryland	Klöckner Stadium, Charlottesville, Virginia	4,900	Recap	UMD 36–28–8
2010 ACC season	October 29, 2010	#5 Virginia	0–2	#3 Maryland	Klöckner Stadium, Charlottesville, Virginia	3,944	Recap	UMD 37–28–8
2010 ACC Tournament	November 12, 2010	#3 Maryland	2–0	#13 Virginia	WakeMed Soccer Park, Cary, North Carolina	1,937	Recap	UMD 38–28–8
2011 ACC season	October 7, 2011	Virginia	2–1	#23 Maryland	Klöckner Stadium, Charlottesville, Virginia	2,898	Recap	UMD 38–29–8
2012 ACC season	October 5, 2012	#1 Maryland	1–0	Virginia	Ludwig Field, College Park, Maryland	4,846	Recap	UMD 39–29–8
2013 ACC season	October 11, 2013	#23 Virginia	3–3	#5 Maryland	Klöckner Stadium, Charlottesville, Virginia	1,708	Recap	UMD 39–29–9
2013 ACC Tournament	November 17, 2013	#4 Maryland	1–0	#12 Virginia	Maryland SoccerPlex, Boyds, Maryland	4,763	Recap	UMD 40–29–9
2013 NCAA Tournament	December 13, 2013	#4 Maryland	1–0	#8 Virginia	PPL Park, Chester, Pennsylvania	4,172	Recap	UMD 41–29–9
2015 NCAA Tournament	November 22, 2015	#10 Maryland	1–0	Virginia	Ludwig Field, College Park, Maryland	2,737	Recap	UMD 42–29–9
2018 NCAA season	September 3, 2018	Maryland	0–0	#11 Virginia	Audi Field, Washington, D.C.	3,527	Recap	UMD 42–29–10
2019 NCAA season	September 2, 2019	#1 Maryland	0–2	#12 Virginia	Audi Field, Washington, D.C.	1,884	Recap	UMD 42–30–10
2021 NCAA season	September 6, 2021	#7 Maryland	2–1	Virginia	Audi Field, Washington, D.C.	1,987	Recap	UMD 43–30–10
2022 NCAA season	September 5, 2022	#9 Maryland	6–1	Virginia	Audi Field, Washington, D.C.	2,022	Recap	UMD 44–30–10
2023 NCAA season	September 4, 2023	#15 Virginia	2–1	#20 Maryland	Klöckner Stadium, Charlottesville, Virginia	2,139	Recap	UMD 44–31–10
2024 NCAA season	September 2, 2024	Virginia	1–1	Maryland	Ludwig Field, College Park, Maryland	2,402	Recap	UMD 44–31–11

== Honors ==
Team	NCAA National Championships	ACC Championships	Big Ten Championships	Conference Regular Season
Virginia	7	9	N/A	18
Maryland	4	6	3	24
Combined	11	15	3	42

== See also ==
- Maryland–Virginia football rivalry
- Maryland–Virginia lacrosse rivalry
