= Virginia Intercollegiate Soccer Association tournament =

Virginia Intercollegiate Soccer Association Tournament (defunct)
- State Association Soccer Championship
- Sport: College soccer
- Conference: Virginia Intercollegiate League
- Number of teams: 4
- Format: Single-elimination tournament
- Played: 1961–1984
- Current champion: Virginia
- Most championships: Virginia (9)

The VISA Men's Soccer Tournament was a college soccer tournament for programs in the Virginia Intercollegiate Soccer Association's Virginia Intercollegiate League that was held from 1961 until 1984.

Virginia is the most winning team of the competition with 9 titles.

== Champions ==
=== Finals ===
Key

- (1) – Title number
- a.e.t. – Match went to extra time
- p – Match decided by a penalty shootout after extra time
- – Winning team won regular season

==== Details ====
Ed.	Year	Champion	Score	Runner–up	Venue	City	Ref.
1	1961	Virginia (1)	2–1	Lynchburg	Shellenberger Field	Lynchburg, Virginia	
2	1962	Virginia (2)	3–2	Lynchburg	Scott Stadium	Charlottesville, Virginia	
3	1963	Virginia (3)	1–0	Lynchburg	Scott Stadium	Charlottesville, Virginia	
4	1964	Washington & Lee (1) (Note: Although the match finished in a tie, Washington & Lee was crowned champion.)	2–2 (a.e.t.)	Virginia	Shellenberger Field	Lynchburg, Virginia	
5	1965	Randolph–Macon (1)	1–0	Virginia	(unknown)	(unknown)	
6	1966	(unknown)					
7	1967	Eastern Mennonite (1)	5–4	Virginia	Patchin Field	Lexington, Virginia	
8	1968	(unknown)					
9	1969	Roanoke (1) (Note: Both teams crowned champions, no extra time played.)	0–0	–	Scott Stadium	Charlottesville, Virginia	
9	1969	Virginia (4)	0–0	–	Scott Stadium	Charlottesville, Virginia	
10	1970	Virginia (5)	2–1	William & Mary	Scott Stadium	Charlottesville, Virginia	
11	1971	Lynchburg (1)	1–0 (a.e.t.)	Virginia	Shellenberger Field	Lynchburg, Virginia	
12	1972	James Madison (1) (Note: Although the match finished in a tie, James Madison was crowned champion.)	0–0 (a.e.t.)	Randolph–Macon	JMU Soccer Field	Harrisonburg, Virginia	
13	1973	James Madison (2)	3–1	George Mason	JMU Soccer Field	Harrisonburg, Virginia	
14	1974	James Madison (3) (Note: Title shared after both teams tied after the extra time.)	0–0 (a.e.t.)	–	George Mason Stadium	Fairfax, Virginia	
14	1974	George Mason (1)	0–0 (a.e.t.)	–	George Mason Stadium	Fairfax, Virginia	
15	1975	James Madison (4)	2–1	Old Dominion	JMU Soccer Field	Harrisonburg, Virginia	
16	1976	Lynchburg (1)	?	(unknown)	?	?	
17	1977	Virginia (6)	2–1	William & Mary	Scott Stadium	Charlottesville, Virginia	
18	1978	William & Mary (1)	1–0	Randolph–Macon	Cary Stadium	Williamsburg, Virginia	
19	1979	William & Mary (2)	1–0	James Madison	JMU Soccer Field	Harrisonburg, Virginia	
20	1980	William & Mary (3)	1–0	Old Dominion	Cary Stadium	Williamsburg, Virginia	
21	1981	Virginia (7)	3–2	William & Mary	Scott Stadium	Charlottesville, Virginia	
22	1982	Virginia (8)	3–2	George Mason	George Mason Stadium	Fairfax, Virginia	
23	1983	(unknown)	?	Lynchburg	?	?	
24	1984	Virginia (9)	3–2	George Mason	Scott Stadium	Charlottesville, Virginia	
