= Carlos García (footballer, born 1981) =

Colombian footballer

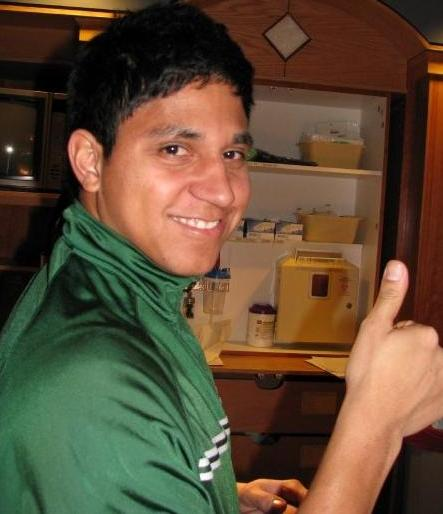

Personal information
- Full name: Carlos Felipe García Domínguez
- Date of birth: May 31, 1981 (age 45)
- Place of birth: Cali, Colombia
- Height: 1.77 m (5 ft 9 1/2 in)
- Position: Defender

Youth career
- 1985–1999: Academia Tucamán

College career
Years	Team	Apps	(Gls)
1999–2003	William & Mary Tribe	90	(45)

Senior career*
Years	Team	Apps	(Gls)
2001–2003	Williamsburg Legacy		
2003–2012	Baltimore Blast (indoor)	177	(76)
2003–2004	Virginia Beach Mariners	37	(6)
2005	Montreal Impact	11	(0)
- * Club domestic league appearances and goals as of 4 November 2010 (UTC)

Carlos García is a Colombian professional soccer player formerly of the Baltimore Blast in the MISL.

== Career ==
=== Youth ===
García was born and raised in Colombia. He learned to play soccer at the Academia Tucamán in his hometown of Cali, Valle del Cauca. The club played at a very high level by local youth soccer standards. His long-time teammate and friend at Tucamán, Daniel Cruz, left the academy at 17 to join AFC Ajax in Amsterdam and now plays in the Belgian Pro league.

=== College ===
García came to the United States in 1999 via a soccer scholarship to The College of William and Mary. He was identified by William and Mary head coach Al Albert when his high school soccer team attended Albert's Tidewater Soccer Camp in Virginia. Carlos's physical style of play was well-suited for NCAA soccer.

García was a First-Team All-South Atlantic Region selection his last season playing for the William & Mary Tribe. He recorded nine goals and 11 assists his final year to lead the Tribe to the third round of the NCAA Tournament. Carlos recorded 121 points throughout his William & Mary career and graduated in 2003.

In May 2015, García was inducted to the William & Mary Athletics Hall of Fame.

=== A-League ===
García spent the 2003 and 2004 seasons with the professional outdoor team the Virginia Beach Mariners. He recorded five goals and nine assists in 25 games in 2004 and was named A-League Player of the Week on August 10. He ranked second in the A-League that season with nine assists to teammates.

=== Baltimore Blast ===
García is one of the most accomplished team players in the history of American professional indoor soccer.

On November 14, 2003, García scored a goal on the first shift of his first professional indoor soccer game. For the following eight seasons Carlos was an integral part of the highly successful Baltimore Blast indoor soccer team, which competed in the MISL. A rough player with an eye for goal, in the 2006–07 season, García ranked third among Blast players in points (42) and led the entire league in penalty minutes (27). He played in his 100th game for the Blast against the New Jersey Ironmen on February 16, 2008. Carlos was an integral part of the club's championship squads in 2004, 2006, 2008, and 2009.

== Personal ==
García is known to friends and family simply as "Charlie".
