= Williamsburg Wizards =

- Founded: 1989 (dissolved 1999)
- Ground: Williamsburg Municipal Fields (JCC Rec Center, Magruder, Queens Lake, et al)
- Manager: Al Albert (assisted by Bob Behncke)
- League: SEVYSA (1989-1996), VCCL (1997-1999)

The Williamsburg Wizards were an American youth soccer team, based in Williamsburg, Virginia.

== Team Formation ==
In 1989, Williamsburg Wizards head coach Al Albert went door-to-door to elementary school gym teachers in Williamsburg, Virginia asking them for names of the most athletic students in their 4th grade class. A selection of those names soon formed the nucleus of the first Wizards soccer team which went undefeated in its first 32 matches. Over the years, the team was able to attract added talent from up to an hour in all directions based on the magnetic draw of its coaching staff in Al Albert, who at the time was the head coach of the men's team at the College of William and Mary.

== Virginia State Cup ==
The Williamsburg Wizards dominated their age group of the Virginia Youth Soccer Association (VYSA) in the 1990s. The Wizards competed before the advent of the US Soccer Academy system, and therefore, the VYSA State Cup Championship was the undisputed highest honor to be achieved each year in the commonwealth.

- U11 Virginia State Champions (1991, record 38-8-8)
- U13 Virginia State Champions (1993, record 52-10-9)
- U14 Virginia State Champions (1994, record 45-16-10)
- U15 Virginia State Champions (1995, record 48-10-8)
- U16 Virginia State Champions (1996, record n/a)
- U19 Virginia State Champions (1999, record n/a)

== Coaching ==
The Wizards were coached by Al Albert, who was assisted by Bob Behncke. Albert is best known as the long-time head men's soccer coach at the College of William and Mary (33yrs, 1971-2003). Behncke was a regional all-American selection for the Army men's soccer program in the late sixties. Albert and Behncke both had sons who played every season for the Wizards.

== Individual players ==
Matt Behncke - The Wizards' most valuable contributor on the field was Matt Behncke, now a retired professional soccer player. Matt was part of the original Wizards team in 1989, and played all eleven seasons for the club. His play earned him a youth national team call-up at the U-16 level, traveling to an international tournament in Montaigu, France. After a standout career at Princeton University, Behncke was drafted 18th overall in the 2002 MLS SuperDraft by the Dallas Burn. He played four seasons in the MLS.

Bret Myers - Bret Myers joined the Wizards in the mid-90s, and was largely responsible for many of the team's successes in the latter part of that decade. Myers went on to be a four-year letter winner for the University of Richmond Spiders. After graduating college, Myers spent two seasons with the Richmond Kickers A-League professional team. He won a gold medal with Team USA at the 11th Pan American Maccabi Games in Buenos Aires, Argentina, in 2008.

Warley and Miller - The Wizards produced a pair of college football placekickers in Carter Warley and Kevin Miller. Warley, an original Wizard, was the starting kicker for a Virginia Tech football program that was a national contender during his time in Blacksburg. Kevin Miller joined the Wizards in the mid-90s. Miller was the starting placekicker for the East Carolina Pirates and then for the Berlin Thunder in NFL Europe.

Others - Upon graduation, the exceeding majority of Wizards players not mentioned above went on to join various division-1 college soccer programs throughout the state of Virginia such as American, James Madison, Radford, University of Virginia, Virginia Commonwealth, Virginia Tech, and William and Mary.

== Additional References ==
- Williamsburg Wizards Heading For State Youth Soccer Tourney [https://archive.today/20130120075645/http://articles.dailypress.com/1991-05-21]
- U-16 Wizards Look Beyond State Crown [https://archive.today/20130120055201/http://articles.dailypress.com/1995-12-12]
- Wizards Put End To Streak [https://archive.today/20130120052051/http://articles.dailypress.com/1996-09-10]
- Sidekicks, Express Make Impact For Wsc [http://articles.dailypress.com/1997-01-21
