= Albert–Daly Field =

Sports facility in Virginia, US

Martin Family Stadium

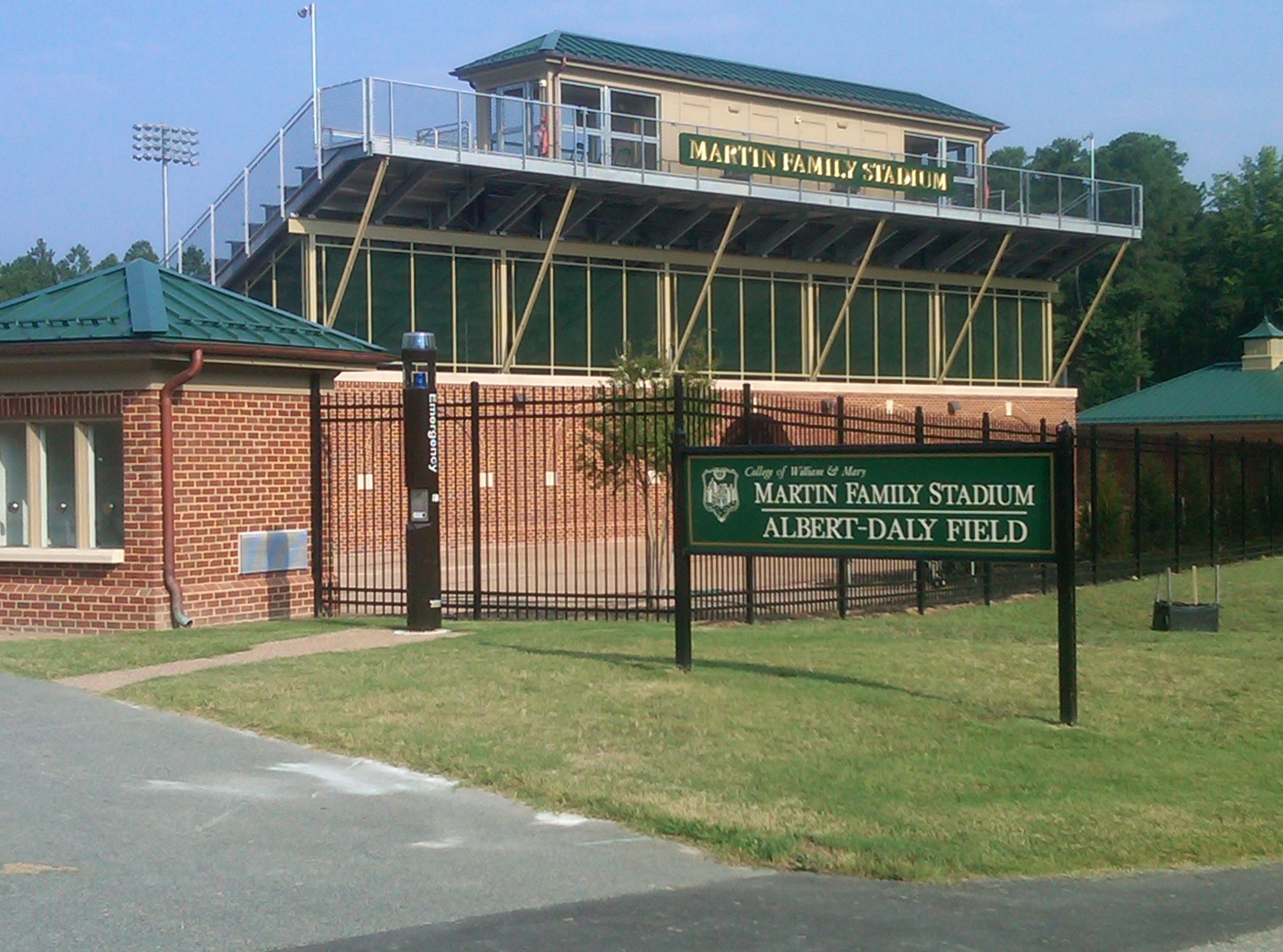
- Exterior view of the stadium in 2011
- Interactive map of Martin Family Stadium
- Full name: Martin Family Stadium at Albert–Daly Field
- Address: Williamsburg, VA; United States
- Coordinates: 37.2911599°N 76.7329574°W
- Owner: College of William & Mary
- Operator: William & Mary Athletics
- Capacity: 1,000
- Type: Stadium
- Surface: Natural grass
- Current use: Soccer; Lacrosse

Construction
- Opened: August 28, 2004
- Expanded: 2010

Tenants
- William & Mary Tribe (NCAA) teams: men's and women's soccer; women's lacrosse

Website
- tribeathletics.com/martin-family-stadium

Martin Family Stadium at Albert-Daly Field is a stadium located in Williamsburg, Virginia on the campus of the College of William and Mary. The venue serves as home to the William & Mary Tribe men's and women's soccer and lacrosse teams for the college.

The facility was paid for thanks in large part to a sizable challenge grant made by Jim and Bobbie Ukrop. The Ukrops suggested that the field be named in honor of long time soccer coaches Al Albert and John Daly. Opened in 2004, the original venue consisted of a natural grass playing surface, lighting, and temporary bleacher seating.

In 2010, the college broke ground on a new 1,000-seat spectator pavilion at Albert–Daly Field. The structure, "Martin Family Stadium", is named in honor of Eff and Patty Martin, and their children. In addition to spectator seating, the building has a press box, filming positions, and restroom facilities. The project was completed in the spring of 2011.
