= Matt Behncke =

American soccer player and attorney

Personal information
- Date of birth: February 20, 1980 (age 46)
- Place of birth: Williamsburg, Virginia, United States
- Height: 1.91 m (6 ft 3 in)
- Position: Defender

Youth career
- 1989–1998: Williamsburg Wizards

College career
Years	Team	Apps	(Gls)
1998–2002	Princeton Tigers		

Senior career*
Years	Team	Apps	(Gls)
2002–2004	Dallas Burn	33	(1)
2004–2006	Real Salt Lake	8	(0)
2006	Williamsburg Legacy		
- * Club domestic league appearances and goals

Matt Behncke (born February 20, 1980) is an American former professional soccer player and attorney. He last played for Real Salt Lake of Major League Soccer (MLS). He is now a partner with the law firm of Susman Godfrey.

== Soccer career ==
Behncke grew up in Williamsburg, Virginia playing his youth soccer with the Williamsburg Wizards. Before joining MLS, Behncke played four years of college soccer for Princeton University. In 1998, his first year at Princeton, Behncke was named the Ivy League Rookie of the Year. In his sophomore year, he was a second team All-Ivy selection, while leading the Tigers to an Ivy League title. In both his junior and senior seasons, Behncke was named first team All-Ivy. In 2002, Behncke was the sole recipient of the William Winston Roper award, the highest male student-athlete award at Princeton. The award is given annually to a Princeton senior of high scholastic rank, outstanding sportsmanship, and general athletic ability.

Upon graduating, Behncke was drafted 18th overall in the 2002 MLS SuperDraft by the Dallas Burn. In his first year with Dallas, Behncke did not make much of an impact, playing only 190 minutes. In his second year, however, Behncke developed into a useful utility player for the Burn, capable of playing adequately at either central defense or left fullback. Behncke saw an increased role in 2004, starting almost half of the Burn's games.

However, after the 2004 season, he was selected by Real Salt Lake in the Expansion Draft. Following the 2005 season, Behncke was waived and retired from professional soccer to attend law school at the University of Texas School of Law. In 2006, he played for the Williamsburg Legacy, his hometown club, in the fourth division Premier Development League, prior to beginning school in Austin.

== Legal career ==
While attending law school at the University of Texas School of Law, Behncke was selected as the chief articles editor of the Texas Law Review.

After law school, Behncke served as a law clerk to John M. Rogers of the United States Court of Appeals for the Sixth Circuit. On January 1, 2017, Behncke was elected to the partnership of Susman Godfrey L.L.P. Behncke is based out of the Houston, Texas office.
