= William & Mary Tribe women's soccer, 1981–89 =

Decade of collegiate soccer team

The William & Mary Tribe women's soccer teams represent The College of William & Mary in National Collegiate Athletic Association (NCAA) Division I competition. Located in Williamsburg, Virginia, United States, the women's soccer program began its official participation as a varsity sport in 1981. The first head coach was John Charles, who led the program for five seasons and compiled a 50–29–11 overall record. In 1986, Englishman John Daly took over and continued on his predecessor's success. Daly is still the head coach through the 2009 season.

Starting in 1984, the Tribe earned berths into the NCAA Women's Soccer Championship in every season for the rest of the 1980s. In 1987 and 1989 they made their way to the Elite 8, making them one of only eight teams remaining in the college soccer season.

| Contents: | 1981 - 1982 - 1983 - 1984 - 1985 - 1986 - 1987 - 1988 - 1989 |

== 1981 ==
- Head coach: John Charles (1st year)
- Overall record: 9–8–0
- Conference record: N/A
- Goals scored: 41
- Goals against: 41

| Date | Opponent | Win/Loss | Score | Record |
|---|---|---|---|---|
| September 19 | Richmond Club | W | 5–1 | 1–0–0 |
| September 23 | @ Randolph-Macon | W | 8–0 | 2–0–0 |
| September 26 | @ Mary Washington | W | 4–2 | 3–0–0 |
| October 3 | @ North Carolina | L | 1–13 | 3–1–0 |
| October 3 | vs. Randolph-Macon | W | 7–1 | 4–1–0 |
| October 8 | Old Dominion Club | L | 0–1 | 4–2–0 |
| October 15 | Randolph-Macon | W | 2–0 | 5–2–0 |
| October 17 | @ Virginia | L | 1–4 | 5–3–0 |
| October 18 | @ James Madison Club | L | 3–5 | 5–4–0 |
| October 24 | Mary Washington | W | 3–0 | 6–4–0 |
| October 26 | Old Dominion | W | 3–0 | 7–4–0 |
| October 29 | @ George Washington | L | 0–6 | 7–5–0 |
| November | Virginia Tech Club | L | 0–2 | 7–6–0 |
| November | Virginia | L | 1–3 | 7–7–0 |
| November | Richmond Club | W | 2–1 | 8–7–0 |
| November | Radford | L | 0–2 | 8–8–0 |
| November | Virginia Law School Club | W | 1–0 | 9–8–0 |

== 1982 ==
- Head coach: John Charles (2nd year)
- Overall record: 8–5–3
- Conference record: N/A
- Goals scored: 38
- Goals against: 27

| Date | Opponent | Win/Loss | Score | Record |
|---|---|---|---|---|
| Dates missing | Richmond | W | 4–1 | 1–0–0 |
| | Old Dominion | W | 2–0 | 2–0–0 |
| | Randolph-Macon | W | 4–1 | 3–0–0 |
| | George Mason | L | 1–4 | 3–1–0 |
| | George Washington | W | 2–1 (ot) | 4–1–0 |
| | Virginia Tech | L | 0–3 | 4–2–0 |
| | Radford | L | 1–2 | 4–3–0 |
| | James Madison | T | 0–0 (ot) | 4–3–1 |
| | Virginia Wesleyan | W | 12–0 | 5–3–1 |
| | Mary Washington | W | 3–1 | 6–3–1 |
| | Radford | T | 1–1 (ot) | 6–3–2 |
| | George Washington | T | 1–1 (ot) | 6–3–3 |
| | North Carolina | L | 0–6 | 6–4–3 |
| | James Madison | W | 3–2 | 7–4–3 |
| | Radford | L | 1–2 | 7–5–3 |
| | Virginia Tech | W | 3–2 (ot) | 8–5–3 |

== 1983 ==
ECAC Champion
- Head coach: John Charles (3rd year)
- Overall record: 12–6–2
- Conference record: 1–2–0
- Goals scored: 42
- Goals against: 20

| Date | Opponent | Win/Loss | Score | Record |
|---|---|---|---|---|
| Dates missing | Central Florida | L | 0–3 | 0–1–0 |
| | Wisconsin | W | 5–0 | 1–1–0 |
| | Cincinnati | L | 1–3 | 1–2–0 |
| | Maryland Club | W | 6–1 | 2–2–0 |
| | Virginia | T | 1–1 (ot) | 2–2–1 |
| | Randolph-Macon | W | 8–0 | 3–2–1 |
| | Radford | W | 2–0 | 4–2–1 |
| | George Mason* | L | 1–3 | 4–3–1 |
| | North Carolina | L | 0–4 | 4–4–1 |
| | SUNY Cortland | W | 2–1 | 5–4–1 |
| | George Washington | T | 0–0 (ot) | 5–4–2 |
| | Texas Club | W | 1–0 | 6–4–2 |
| | George Mason* | L | 0–2 | 6–5–2 |
| | James Madison Club* | W | 5–0 | 7–5–2 |
| | Virginia Tech Club | W | 3–0 | 8–5–2 |
| | George Washington | W | 1–0 (ot) | 9–5–2 |
| | Virginia Tech Club | W | 3–0 | 10–5–2 |
| | Radford | L | 1–2 | 10–6–2 |
| | Colgate | W | 1–0 | 11–6–2 |
| | Radford | W | 1–0 | 12–6–2 |

== 1984 ==
NCAA First Round
- Head coach: John Charles (4th year)
- Overall record: 11–7–3
- Conference record: 0–1–1
- Goals scored: 34
- Goals against: 27

| Date | Opponent | Outcome | Score | Record |
|---|---|---|---|---|
| September 12 | Virginia | W | 1–0 | 1–0–0 |
| September 16 | Cincinnati | W | 3–0 | 2–0–0 |
| September 22 | vs. Boston College | L | 1–2 | 2–1–0 |
| September 22 | SUNY Cortland | T | 0–0 (ot) | 2–1–1 |
| September 23 | UMass | W | 2–0 (ot) | 3–1–1 |
| September 29 | vs. Central Florida | L | 0–2 | 3–2–1 |
| September 30 | vs. Adelphi | W | 2–1 (ot) | 4–2–1 |
| October 13 | George Washington | W | 2–0 | 5–2–1 |
| October | North Carolina | L | 0–5 | 5–3–1 |
| October | Rutgers | W | 2–1 | 6–3–1 |
| October | Army Club | W | 5–0 | 7–3–1 |
| October | George Mason* | T | 0–0 (ot) | 7–3–2 |
| October | North Carolina | L | 0–3 | 7–4–2 |
| October 13 | George Washington | W | 3–0 | 8–4–2 |
| October 14 | Virginia Tech Club | W | 3–0 | 9–4–2 |
| October 20 | @ N.C. State | T | 1–1 (ot) | 9–4–3 |
| October 21 | @ N.C. Wesleyan | W | 5–0 | 10–4–3 |
| October 22 | @ Methodist | W | 2–0 | 11–4–3 |
| October 23 | @ North Carolina | L | 0–5 | 11–5–3 |
| October 27 | @ George Mason* | L | 1–4 | 11–6–3 |
| November 4 | @ Central Florida (NCAA First Round) | L | 1–3 | 11–7–3 |

== 1985 ==
NCAA First Round
- Head coach: John Charles (5th year)
- Overall record: 10–3–3
- Conference record: 0–1–0
- Goals scored: 28
- Goals against: 13

| Date | Opponent | Outcome | Score | Record |
|---|---|---|---|---|
| September 8 | Virginia | W | 3–1 | 1–0–0 |
| September 14 | George Mason* | L | 1–2 | 1–1–0 |
| September | Cornell | W | 2–0 | 2–1–0 |
| September | Ithaca | W | 1–0 | 3–1–0 |
| September | Hartwick | W | 3–0 | 4–1–0 |
| September | @ SUNY Cortland | T | 0–0 (ot) | 4–1–1 |
| September 29 | N.C. State | T | 0–0 (ot) | 4–1–2 |
| October 5 | @ George Washington | W | 4–0 | 5–1–2 |
| October 13 | Maryland Club | W | 2–1 | 6–1–2 |
| October | N.C. State | T | 0–0 (ot) | 6–1–3 |
| October | Harvard | W | 1–0 | 7–1–3 |
| October 13 | Central Florida | W | 1–0 | 8–1–3 |
| October 19 | Radford | W | 1–0 | 9–1–3 |
| October 20 | Methodist | W | 4–2 | 10–1–3 |
| November 2 | @ Wisconsin | L | 3–4 | 10–2–3 |
| November 9 | @ George Mason (NCAA First Round) | L | 2–3 (ot) | 10–3–3 |

== 1986 ==
NCAA First Round
- Head coach: John Daly (1st year)
- Overall record: 15–3–1
- Conference record: N/A
- Goals scored: 53
- Goals against: 11

| Date | Opponent | Outcome | Score | Record |
|---|---|---|---|---|
| September 6 | George Washington | W | 4–0 | 1–0–0 |
| September 13 | Cincinnati | W | 6–2 | 2–0–0 |
| September 14 | Virginia | W | 4–0 | 3–0–0 |
| September 20 | vs. North Carolina | L | 1–5 | 3–1–0 |
| September 21 | vs. Wisconsin | W | 1–0 | 4–1–0 |
| September 28 | @ N.C. State | W | 1–0 | 5–1–0 |
| October 4 | Maryland | W | 2–0 | 6–1–0 |
| October 5 | Virginia Tech | W | 11–0 | 7–1–0 |
| October | Maryland | W | 2–0 | 8–1–0 |
| October | Boston College | W | 1–0 | 9–1–0 |
| October | Old Dominion Club | W | 4–0 | 10–1–0 |
| October | Radford | W | 2–0 | 11–1–0 |
| October | North Carolina | L | 0–2 | 11–2–0 |
| October 17 | @ Colorado College | T | 1–1 (ot) | 11–2–1 |
| October 18 | vs. Sonoma State | W | 2–0 | 12–2–1 |
| October | @ Northern Colorado | W | 1–0 | 13–2–1 |
| October 25 | Mary Washington | W | 6–0 | 14–2–1 |
| October 26 | Methodist | W | 4–0 | 15–2–1 |
| November 9 | N.C. State (NCAA First Round) | L | 0–1 | 15–3–1 |

== 1987 ==
NCAA Elite Eight
- Head coach: John Daly (2nd year)
- Overall record: 10–7–3
- Conference record: N/A
- Goals scored: 29
- Goals against: 21

| Date | Opponent | Outcome | Score | Record |
|---|---|---|---|---|
| September 5 | @ Virginia | L | 0–1 | 0–1–0 |
| September 11 | George Mason | W | 3–0 | 1–1–0 |
| September 13 | Hartford | W | 4–0 (ot) | 2–1–0 |
| September 20 | @ North Carolina | L | 0–4 | 2–2–0 |
| September 25 | Colorado College | W | 2–1 | 3–2–0 |
| September 27 | Connecticut | L | 2–4 | 3–3–0 |
| September 30 | @ Maryland | W | 3–1 | 4–3–0 |
| October 3 | @ N.C. State | L | 0–1 | 4–4–0 |
| October | George Washington | T | 0–0 (ot) | 4–4–1 |
| October | Radford | W | 2–0 | 5–4–1 |
| October | Texas A&M | W | 3–0 | 6–4–1 |
| October | George Mason | W | 4–2 | 7–4–1 |
| October | North Carolina | T | 0–0 (PKs 4–2) | 7–4–2 |
| October 17 | @ Cincinnati | W | 1–0 (ot) | 8–4–2 |
| October 18 | @ Wisconsin | T | 1–1 (ot) | 8–4–3 |
| October 24 | Central Florida | L | 0–2 | 8–5–3 |
| October 25 | Brown | W | 3–1 (ot) | 9–5–3 |
| November 1 | @ Cornell | L | 0–1 (ot) | 9–6–3 |
| November 8 | Virginia (NCAA First Round) | W | 1–0 (ot) | 10–6–3 |
| November 14 | North Carolina (NCAA Elite Eight) | L | 0–2 | 10–7–3 |

== 1988 ==
NCAA First Round
- Head coach: John Daly (3rd year)
- Overall record: 15–4–2
- Conference record: N/A
- Goals scored: 36
- Goals against: 12

| Date | Opponent | Outcome | Score | Record |
|---|---|---|---|---|
| September 3 | @ Mary Washington | W | 4–1 | 1–0–0 |
| September 4 | N.C. State | L | 0–2 | 1–1–0 |
| September 10 | @ Hartford | W | 2–0 | 2–1–0 |
| September 11 | vs. New Hampshire | W | 2–1 | 3–1–0 |
| September 18 | Virginia | T | 0–0 (ot) | 3–1–1 |
| September 24 | Boston College | W | 2–1 | 4–1–1 |
| September 25 | Villanova | W | 3–0 | 5–1–1 |
| September 28 | @ George Mason | W | 1–0 | 6–1–1 |
| October 1 | North Carolina | L | 1–3 | 6–2–1 |
| October 2 | Maryland | W | 5–0 | 7–2–1 |
| October | Duke | W | 1–0 | 8–2–1 |
| October | Providence | W | 2–0 | 9–2–1 |
| October | Texas A&M | W | 1–0 | 10–2–1 |
| October | George Mason | T | 0–0 (ot) | 10–2–2 |
| October 15 | Wisconsin | W | 1–0 | 11–2–2 |
| October 16 | Colorado College | L | 0–1 | 11–3–2 |
| October 22 | Connecticut | W | 1–0 | 12–3–2 |
| October 23 | @ Adelphi | W | 2–1 | 13–3–2 |
| October 26 | Radford | W | 3–1 | 14–3–2 |
| October 29 | Cornell | W | 5–0 | 15–3–2 |
| November 5 | George Mason (NCAA First Round) | L | 0–1 | 15–4–2 |

== 1989 ==
NCAA Elite Eight
- Head coach: John Daly (4th year)
- Overall record: 14–4–2
- Conference record: N/A
- Goals scored: 49
- Goals against: 13

| Date | Opponent | Outcome | Score | Record |
|---|---|---|---|---|
| September 2 | @ Mary Washington | W | 8–1 | 1–0–0 |
| September 3 | Hartford | W | 1–0 | 2–0–0 |
| September 10 | @ N.C. State | L | 0–1 | 2–1–0 |
| September 13 | @ Virginia | W | 1–0 | 3–1–0 |
| September 16 | Villanova | W | 5–0 | 4–1–0 |
| September 17 | New Hampshire | W | 2–0 | 5–1–0 |
| September 20 | @ Maryland | W | 4–0 | 6–1–0 |
| September 23 | @ Harvard | W | 2–0 | 7–1–0 |
| September 24 | @ Brown | L | 1–2 | 7–2–0 |
| September 27 | @ Duke | W | 2–1 | 8–2–0 |
| October 1 | George Mason | T | 2–2 (ot) | 8–2–1 |
| October | Monmouth | W | 5–0 | 9–2–1 |
| October | Kean | W | 3–0 | 10–2–1 |
| October | TCU | W | 3–0 | 11–2–1 |
| October 14 | St. Mary's | W | 2–1 (ot) | 12–2–1 |
| October 15 | @ Colorado College | L | 1–2 | 12–3–1 |
| October 21 | Connecticut | W | 2–0 | 13–3–1 |
| October 22 | Massachusetts | T | 0–0 (ot) | 13–3–2 |
| October 28 | Boston College | W | 4–1 | 14–3–2 |
| November 12 | N.C. State (NCAA Elite Eight) | L | 1–2 | 14–4–2 |
