= Rich Costanzo =

American soccer player

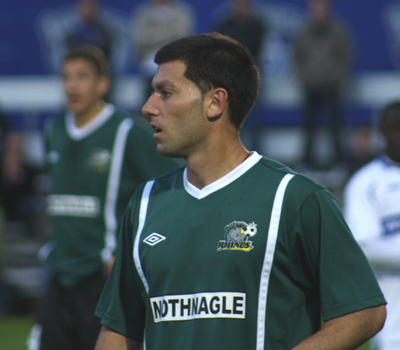

Personal information
- Full name: Richard Costanzo
- Date of birth: February 17, 1986 (age 40)
- Place of birth: Pittsburgh, Pennsylvania, United States
- Height: 5 ft 9 in (1.75 m)
- Position: Defender

College career
Years	Team	Apps	(Gls)
2004–2005	Penn State Nittany Lions	21	(4)
2006–2008	Maryland Terrapins	66	(1)

Senior career*
Years	Team	Apps	(Gls)
2009	Minnesota Thunder	20	(1)
2010–2011	Rochester Rhinos	39	(4)
2010–2011	Baltimore Blast (indoor)		
2012–2013	Pittsburgh Riverhounds	43	(3)

Managerial career
- 2022–: George Mason Patriots
- * Club domestic league appearances and goals as of July 21, 2012

Richard "Rich" Costanzo (born February 17, 1986, in Pittsburgh, Pennsylvania) is an American soccer player who formerly played for the Pittsburgh Riverhounds in the USL Professional Division. Costanzo is currently the head coach of George Mason.

== Career ==
=== Youth and high school ===
Costanzo attended Thomas Jefferson High School in Pittsburgh, where he was a two-time NSCAA/adidas All-American, a two-time regional All-American, and was twice named the WPIAL (Western Pennsylvania Interscholastic Athletic League) Player of the Year. In 2003, he was also named the NSCAA Pennsylvania State Player of the Year and chosen as an EA Sports All-American. He helped lead the Jaguars to the PIAA (Pennsylvania Interscholastic Athletic Association) State Championship three times, winning the state title in 2002.

Costanzo was selected to play for the Region I Olympic Development Program team from 2000 to 2005 and was a member of the U.S. U–18 National team player pool.

He started his youth soccer in Pittsburgh for the Beadling Soccer Club, before joining FC Delco on the other side of the state.

=== College ===
Costanzo started college soccer at Pennsylvania State University where he was named the 2004 Big Ten Freshman of the Year. He was also named Freshman All-America by Soccer America, Top Draw Soccer, and College Soccer News. He transferred to the University of Maryland, College Park to continue his collegiate career. He became a team captain for the Terps in the 2008 season, and helped lead the team to an ACC Championship and NCAA Division I National Championship.

=== Professional ===
Having not been drafted by Major League Soccer Costanzo signed with Minnesota Thunder on February 26, 2009. He made his professional debut on April 11, 2009, as a second-half substitute in Minnesota's 2009 season-opening game against the Carolina RailHawks.

Costanzo was on the 2010–11 roster of the Baltimore Blast indoor soccer team, but appeared in no games.

== Honors ==
Rochester Rhinos

- USSF Division 2 Pro League Regular Season Champions: 2010
- USL Pro 2011 Regular Season Champions

University of Maryland

- NCAA Men's Division I Soccer Championship: 2008
