= Sean Flatley =

American soccer player

Personal information
- Full name: Sean Daniel Flatley
- Date of birth: December 4, 1988 (age 37)
- Place of birth: Virginia Beach, Virginia, United States
- Height: 1.83 m (6 ft 0 in)
- Position: Defender

College career
Years	Team	Apps	(Gls)
2007–2008	Maryland Terrapins	27	(2)
2009–2010	College of Charleston Cougars	39	(7)

Senior career*
Years	Team	Apps	(Gls)
2011–2012	Charleston Battery	12	(0)
- * Club domestic league appearances and goals as of July 17, 2012

Sean Daniel Flatley (born December 4, 1988, in Virginia Beach, Virginia) is an American soccer player.

== Career ==
=== College ===
Flatley played his first two years of college soccer at the University of Maryland before transferring to the College of Charleston prior to his junior year in 2009. While with Charleston, Flatley made 20 appearances and scored three goals in his junior season and was named SoCon All-Conference First Team. In his senior season, he made 19 appearances and scored four goals.

=== Professional ===
On April 11, 2011, Flatley signed his first professional contract with USL Pro club Charleston Battery. He made his professional debut on May 24 in a 2–1 win over the Richmond Kickers.
