= William & Mary Tribe men's soccer =

American college soccer team

- Founded: 1967; 59 years ago
- University: College of William & Mary
- Head coach: Chris Norris (21st season)
- Conference: CAA
- Location: Williamsburg, Virginia, US
- Stadium: Albert–Daly Field (capacity: 2,271)
- Nickname: Tribe
- Colors: Green and Gold
Home	Away

NCAA tournament Quarterfinals
- 1980, 1996

NCAA tournament appearances
- 1980, 1983, 1987, 1992, 1993, 1995, 1996, 1997, 1998, 1999, 2000, 2002, 2008, 2010, 2013, 2017

Conference tournament championships
- 1983, 1987, 1995, 1996, 1999, 2000, 2010, 2017

Conference regular season championships
- 1976, 1987, 1992, 1994, 1995, 1996, 2002, 2010

The William & Mary Tribe men's soccer team represents the College of William & Mary in NCAA Division I. The team belongs to the Colonial Athletic Association and plays home games at Albert-Daly Field. As of the 2023 season, the Tribe are led by 20th-year head coach Chris Norris. The team has an all-time record 580–357–123 (.605) since its founding in 1967. The Tribe have made 15 appearances in the NCAA tournament with a combined record of 9–15–2.

== Head coaches ==
- Joe Agee (1967–68)
- Jim Carpenter (1969–70)
- Al Albert (1971–2003)
- Chris Norris (2004–present)

== Record by year ==
Season	Coach	Overall	Conference	Standing	Postseason
William & Mary Indians (Southern Conference) (1967–1976)
1967	Joe Agee	3–6	2–1		
1968	Joe Agee	5–4	0–2		
1969	Jim Carpenter	5–6–2	0–1–1	4th	
1970	Jim Carpenter	9–2–2	1–1	4th	
1971	Al Albert	6–7	2–1	2nd	
1972	Al Albert	5–7	2–1	T–2nd	
1973	Al Albert	6–5–1	1–1	5th	
1974	Al Albert	5–5–2	1–2	T–4th	
1975	Al Albert	9–4–1	3–1	2nd	
1976	Al Albert	10–4–1	5–0–1	1st	
William & Mary Indians (Independent) (1977–1982)
1977	Al Albert	13–4			
1978	Al Albert	10–6–3			VISA champions
1979	Al Albert	11–6–1			VISA champions
1980	Al Albert	13–7–2			VISA champions 1980 NCAA Tournament, Quarterfinals
1981	Al Albert	15–4–2			
1982	Al Albert	11–5–5			
William & Mary Tribe (ECAC South) (1983–1984)
1983	Al Albert	14–6–2	3–1	2nd	1983 NCAA Tournament, Second Round
1984	Al Albert	11–6–1	5–2	3rd	
William & Mary Tribe (Colonial Athletic Association) (1985–present)
1985	Al Albert	15–4–2	5–1–1	3rd	
1986	Al Albert	16–5–1	5–1–1	2nd	
1987	Al Albert	14–5–2	6–1	1st	1987 NCAA Tournament, First Round
1988	Al Albert	12–4–4	4–1–2	3rd	
1989	Al Albert	10–5–4	4–1–2	3rd	
1990	Al Albert	11–6–3	5–2	T–3rd	
1991	Al Albert	11–7–3	3–2–2	4th	
1992	Al Albert	15–5–4	5–0–2	1st	1992 NCAA Tournament, Second Round
1993	Al Albert	12–5–3	3–3–2	3rd	1993 NCAA Tournament, First Round
1994	Al Albert	18–3–1	6–0–1	T–1st	
1995	Al Albert	18–6	6–2	T–1st	1995 NCAA Tournament, Second Round
1996	Al Albert	20–3–1	8–0	1st	1996 NCAA Tournament, Quarterfinals
1997	Al Albert	14–6–2	4–2–2	T–3rd	1997 NCAA Tournament, First Round
1998	Al Albert	15–8–2	5–3	T–3rd	1998 NCAA Tournament, Second Round
1999	Al Albert	14–7–3	5–3	5th	1999 NCAA Tournament, First Round
2000	Al Albert	12–9–2	4–3–1	4th	2000 NCAA Tournament, First Round
2001	Al Albert	11–9–1	3–2	3rd	
2002	Al Albert	15–8–1	7–1–1	T–1st	2002 NCAA Tournament, Third Round
2003	Al Albert	9–6–4	4–3–2	T–4th	
2004	Chris Norris	9–7–4	4–4–1	T–5th	
2005	Chris Norris	4–9–5	2–4–5	T–9th	
2006	Chris Norris	8–6–3	4–4–3	7th	
2007	Chris Norris	9–9–3	6–4–1	T–5th	
2008	Chris Norris	11–7–3	6–4–1	T–2nd	2008 NCAA Tournament, Second Round
2009	Chris Norris	13–5–1	8–2–1	T–2nd	
2010	Chris Norris	15–4–3	8–1–2	1st	2010 NCAA Tournament, Third Round
2011	Chris Norris	10–9	7–4	3rd	
2012	Chris Norris	4–10–4	2–5–3	T–8th	
2013	Chris Norris	11–5–3	4–2–1	T–2nd	2013 NCAA Tournament, First Round
2014	Chris Norris	6–11–1	3–4–1	7th	
2015	Chris Norris	7–8–2	2–6	7th	
2016	Chris Norris	13–7–2	3–3–2	T–5th	
2017	Chris Norris	11–5–5	3–2–3	5th	2017 NCAA Tournament, First Round
2018	Chris Norris	6–10–2	3–4–1	5th	
2019	Chris Norris	7–9–2	4–3–1	4th	
2020	Chris Norris	2–4–0	1–3–0	4th	
2021	Chris Norris	7–7–0	4–4–0	7th	
2022	Chris Norris	5–7–6	3–3–3	T–5th	
2023	Chris Norris	2–8–6	1–4–3	T–9th	
2024	Chris Norris	5–10–1	3–4–1	T–7th	
Total:		580–357–123 (.605)			
National champion Postseason invitational champion Conference regular season champion Conference regular season and conference tournament champion Division regular season champion Division regular season and conference tournament champion Conference tournament champion

== Notable alumni ==
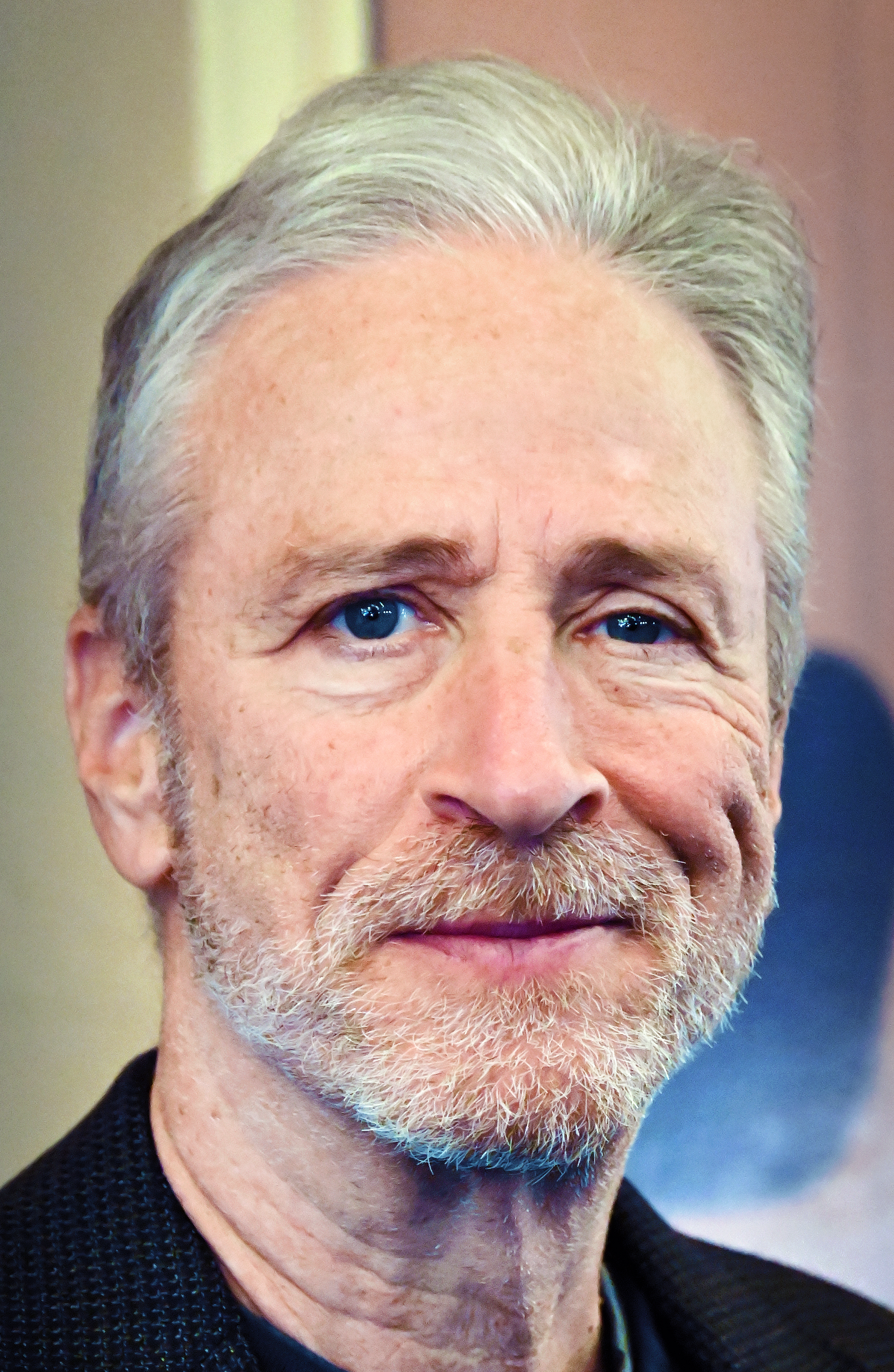
Comedian Jon Stewart played for the Tribe from 1980 to 1983.

- (United States) Wade Barrett (1994–1997)
- (Bermuda) Ralph Bean (2000–2002)
- (United States) Adin Brown (1996–2000)
- (United States) Roger Bothe (2006–2009)
- (United States) Scott Budnick (1989–1993)
- (Colombia) Carlos Garcia (1999–2003)
- (United States) Paul Grafer (1993–1995)
- (United States) Andrew Hoxie (2005–2009)
- (United States) Steve Jolley (1993–1996)
- (United States) Rob Olson (1977–1980)
- (United States) Jon Stewart (1980–1983)
- (United States) Khary Stockton (1989–1992)

== NCAA Tournament performances ==
Year	Round	Opponents	Results/scores
1980	Second round	Howard	W, 1–1 (PK)
1980	Quarterfinals	Alabama A&M	L, 0–1
1983	Second round	Virginia	L, 1–2
1987	First round	Loyola (MD)	L, 0–1
1992	First round	West Virginia	W, 2–0
1992	Second round	NC State	L, 2–3
1993	First round	Virginia	L, 1–2
1995	First round	Creighton	W, 2–1 (OT)
1995	Second round	Wisconsin	L, 0–1 (OT)
1996	First round	Army	W, 3–1
1996	Second round	Maryland	W, 3–0
1996	Quarterfinals	St. John's	L, 1–2 (OT)
1997	First round	#7 American	L, 1–2 (OT)
1998	First round	South Florida	W, 2–1
1998	Second round	#1 Clemson	L, 0–1
1999	First round	Penn State	L, 0–1
2000	First round	#1 North Carolina	L, 2–3 (OT)
2002	First round	Duke	W, 2–1
2002	Second round	#6 Virginia	W, 1–1 (2OT, PK)
2002	Third round	Penn State	L, 0–1 (OT)
2008	First round	Winthrop	W, 3–1
2008	Second round	#1 Wake Forest	L, 0–1 (OT)
2010	First round	UMBC	W, 0–0 (2OT, PK)
2010	Second round	#7 SMU	L, 0–1
2013	First round	George Mason	L, 2–2 (2OT, PK)
2017	First round	Columbia	L, 1–2 (OT)
