= Richard Broad =

American soccer coach

Richard Broad is a former collegiate head's soccer coach. He is best known for serving as the head men's soccer coach at George Mason University, where he compiled an 88-53-15 record from 1976 to 1984. He was twice named South Atlantic Region coach of the year for his efforts. He is a 2008 inductee into the George Mason soccer hall of fame. He previously served as an assistant coach at the University of Massachusetts Amherst and Princeton University. He played college soccer at Princeton University.

He won the 2000 VHSL State Championship and lost the 2005 final.
