= Al Albert (soccer) =

American college soccer coach

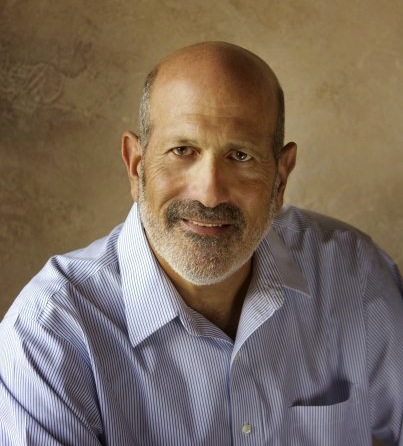

Biographical details
- Born: February 24, 1949 (age 77); Baltimore, Maryland, U.S.

Coaching career (HC unless noted)
- 1971–2003: William & Mary

Head coaching record
- Overall: 401–187–64

Accomplishments and honors

Championships
- 29 Consecutive Winning Seasons (1976–2004), CAA Tournament Titles (1987, 1995, 1996, 1999 and 2000), CAA Regular Season Titles (1987, 1992, 1995, 1996 and 2002), NCAA Elite-8 Appearances (1980, 1996), NCAA Tournament Appearances (1983, 1987, 1992–93, 1995–2000, and 2002), ECAC-South Title (1983)

Awards
- CAA Coach of the Year (1987, 1992, 1994 and 1996), South Atlantic Region Coach of the Year (1992, 1998 and 2002), DC-VA Soccer Hall of Fame 2005, NSCAA Honor Award 2012, Hampton Roads Sports Hall of Fame 2014

Al Albert (born February 24, 1949) is an American college soccer coach. Albert is best known for his long tenure as the head coach of the William & Mary Tribe men's soccer program in Williamsburg, Virginia and as a former President of United Soccer Coaches, the largest soccer coaches organization in the world.

== Early life ==
Albert attended Baltimore City College High School (Class of 1965). He left Baltimore to study at The College of William & Mary (Class of 1969) where he played varsity lacrosse and soccer and majored in sociology.

== Coaching at William and Mary ==
Albert accepted an offer to be the full-time coach of the men's lacrosse and men's soccer programs at The College of William and Mary in 1971. As soccer became increasing popular both on campus and across the country – by 1977 - Albert was exclusively coaching soccer at W&M.

Albert led the William and Mary "Tribe" men's soccer team as head coach for 33 seasons before retiring from coaching in January 2004. He amassed a record of 401–187–64 (.664) during his tenure and became just the eighth coach in NCAA Division I history to reach 400 wins, and just the third to have earned all those wins at one school. The Tribe ranked as one of the top programs in the nation throughout the 1990s, placing eighth in wins (149) and 13th in winning percentage (.708).

The Tribe strung together 29 consecutive winning seasons and 26 straight campaigns of 10 wins or more under Albert's supervision. This level of winning consistency has only been matched by a handful of elite soccer programs across the country: UCLA, Clemson, St. Louis, Indiana, SMU, and UVA.

Many of Albert's former players at William and Mary went on to have successful professional soccer careers; while many distinguished themselves in other ways outside the game.

In tribute to Albert's lasting impact on the landscape of sport at William and Mary, the university hosts all of its home soccer and lacrosse games at Albert-Daly Field, named after Albert and long-time women's soccer head coach John Daly.

== Other Endeavors ==
=== Bibliography ===
Al Albert authored the historical record William and Mary Men's Soccer (Images of Sports), published by Arcadia Publishing in 2010 as part of their Images of Sports series. The book is a 45-year retrospective of the program, and contains a foreword written by Tribe soccer's most famous alumnus, Jon Stewart of the Daily Show.

=== Community Partnership ===
The Soccer Community Partnership in Williamsburg, VA was founded by Albert in 2003 after his retirement from college coaching. The organization exists to provide local elementary school children the opportunity to play organized soccer regardless of socio-economic status. All of the programs are made possible by private donations and a legion of devoted volunteers. Hundreds of local children have participated in clinics, after-school activities, and the local recreational league through the Soccer Community Partnership.

=== Maccabiah ===
Albert assumed the role of head coach of the U.S. men's open soccer team at the 1981 Maccabiah Games and 1985 Maccabiah Games in Israel, earning the silver medal in 1981. More recently, he assisted Amos Magee at the 2007 Pan-Am Maccabiah Games, where the U.S. men's open team won the gold medal defeating the host Argentina 2–0 in the final game.

=== NSCAA ===
The National Soccer Coaches Association of America ("NSCAA") is the largest single sport coaching organization in the world. In 2006, out of 22,000 members worldwide, Al Albert was elected to serve as the NSCAA's 60th President. Today Albert continues to be an active statesman within the organization, where he supports various coaching and developmental initiatives. Albert was selected by the NSCAA as the 2011 recipient of the Association's Honor Award. The prestigious Honor Award is the final presentation given annually at the NSCAA Awards Banquet.

=== Tidewater Soccer Camp ===
Al Albert owned and operated Tidewater Soccer Camp for over 35 years. Tidewater Soccer Camp provided a soccer camping experience to thousands of young men and women from 1974 to 2009.

=== Williamsburg Wizards ===
The Williamsburg Wizards were a dominant youth soccer team based in Williamsburg, Virginia. Albert coached the Wizards for ten seasons. The team consisted of local boys born in 1979 and 1980. The team traveled across the country and Europe competing against the best teams in their age group. The Wizards won six Virginia State Cup championships at u-11, u-13, u-14, u-15, u-16, and u-19.

== Former players ==
=== William & Mary ===
- Jon Stewart 1984 – Host of the Daily Show with Jon Stewart on Comedy Central
- Mark Goldberg – Former owner/chairman of Crystal Palace Football Club (played 1982 and 1983 only)
- Steve Christie – NFL veteran kicker (played spring only)
- Curtis Pride – Major League Baseball outfielder and designated hitter (played spring only)
- Greg Lalas – Soccer journalist (played 1990 only)
- Scott Budnick 1993 – American professional soccer player
- Paul Grafer 1996 – American professional soccer player and US Soccer Youth National Team Assistant Coach
- Steve Jolley 1997 – American professional soccer player
- Wade Barrett 1998 – American professional soccer player and former MLS coach
- Adin Brown 2000 – American professional soccer player
- Ralph Bean 2002 – Bermudian soccer player and coach
- Carlos García 2003 – Colombian professional soccer player

=== Other ===
- Jeff Agoos, 1985 World Maccabiah selection – American professional soccer player
- Matt Behncke, Williamsburg Wizards – American professional soccer player
- Daniel Cruz, Tidewater Soccer Camp – Colombian professional soccer player
- Jarryd Goldberg, 2007 Pan-Am Maccabiah selection – American professional soccer player
- Noah Palmer, Williamsburg Legacy – American professional soccer player
- Gonzalo Segares, Williamsburg Legacy – Costa Rican professional soccer player

== Personal ==
Albert resides in Williamsburg, Virginia with his wife. They have two children. His son, Graham, is married to Chloe Malle who is the editor of American Vogue.

Albert is currently the associate director of Athletic Development at The College of William and Mary.

== See also ==
- List of college men's soccer coaches with 400 wins
