= Virginia Cavaliers men's soccer =

American college soccer team

- 2025 Virginia Cavaliers men's soccer team
- Founded: 1941; 85 years ago
- University: University of Virginia
- Athletic director: Carla Williams
- Head coach: George Gelnovatch (29th season)
- Conference: ACC; Coastal Division
- Location: Charlottesville, Virginia, US
- Stadium: Klöckner Stadium (capacity: 7,100)
- Nickname: Cavaliers, Wahoos
- Colors: Orange and blue
Home	Away

NCAA tournament championships
- 1989, 1991, 1992, 1993, 1994, 2009, 2014

NCAA tournament runner-up
- 1997, 2019

NCAA tournament College Cup
- 1983, 1989, 1991, 1992, 1993, 1994, 1995, 1997, 2006, 2009, 2013, 2014, 2019

NCAA tournament Quarterfinals
- 1983, 1984, 1988, 1989, 1990, 1991, 1992, 1993, 1994, 1995, 1997, 1998, 1999, 2000, 2004, 2006, 2009, 2013, 2014, 2019

NCAA tournament appearances
- 1969, 1979, 1981, 1982, 1983, 1984, 1985, 1986, 1987, 1988, 1989, 1990, 1991, 1992, 1993, 1994, 1995, 1996, 1997, 1998, 1999, 2000, 2001, 2002, 2003, 2004, 2005, 2006, 2007, 2008, 2009, 2010, 2011, 2012, 2013, 2014, 2015, 2016, 2017, 2018, 2019, 2022, 2023, 2024, 2025

Conference tournament championships
- 1988, 1991, 1992, 1993, 1994, 1995, 1997, 2003, 2004, 2009, 2019

Conference regular season championships
- 1969, 1970, 1979, 1984, 1986, 1987, 1988, 1989, 1990, 1991, 1992, 1995, 1996, 1998, 2000, 2001, 2005, 2010, 2019

The Virginia Cavaliers men's soccer team represent the University of Virginia in all NCAA Division I men's soccer competitions. The Virginia Cavaliers are a member of the Atlantic Coast Conference.

Virginia has an extensive reputation as one of the most elite collegiate soccer programs of the United States. The program has produced several prominent United States national team players such as Claudio Reyna, John Harkes, Jeff Agoos, Ben Olsen, and Tony Meola. Future U.S. national team coach Bruce Arena coached Virginia to five College Cup titles in a six-year period during the 1980s and 1990s, and his protégé George Gelnovatch has since guided the Cavaliers to six College Cups and four championship games, winning two of them.

The Cavaliers made the College Cup tournament bracket for a record 39 consecutive years, which ended in 2020, the most of any team in the history of the sport. The program has won seven NCAA Championships (1989, 1991, 1992, 1993, 1994, 2009, 2014) and have the most national titles of any program since 1990. Virginia ranks third overall in the sport's championship history since 1959.

== History ==
The University of Virginia first fielded a varsity men's soccer team in 1941 as a member of the Intercollegiate Soccer Football Association. In their first season, the team posted a winless record, losing all nine of their matches. The Atlantic Coast Conference added soccer in 1955, followed by the first NCAA Men's Division I Soccer Championship in 1959. The team made their first appearance in the NCAA tournament in 1969.

Bruce Arena became Virginia's soccer and assistant lacrosse coach in 1978, moving exclusively to soccer in 1985. The Cavaliers' first tournament victory, over William and Mary in 1983 (a team featuring future comedian Jon Stewart), sparked a run to their first College Cup appearance.

The Cavaliers have qualified for the NCAA tournament every year since 1981; those 39 appearances are a record for men's soccer and one of the longest streaks in any NCAA sport. Their apex came in the late 1980s to early 1990s under Arena, when the team won five national collegiate championships in the span of six years. Future U.S. men's national team stars such as John Harkes and Claudio Reyna were members of these championship teams.

Virginia's first championship, in 1989, came in one of the most famous games in the history of college soccer. Played at Rutgers University on December 3 against Santa Clara, the wind chill was ten degrees below zero at kickoff and fell further during the game. Virginia led the defensive slugfest 1–0 before a rare mistake from Curt Onalfo in the 84th minute allowed Santa Clara to send the game to overtime. As NCAA rules had recently changed to limit games to one 30-minute overtime followed by a 30-minute sudden-death period – after the 1985 final required eight 10-minute extra periods – and did not allow penalty kicks in the final, Virginia and Santa Clara were declared co-champions when the game remained tied 1–1 after 150 minutes.

The Cavaliers went on to win the 1991, 1992, 1993, and 1994 editions of the tournament, and as the first overall seed were upset in the semifinals in 1995. The four consecutive championships remains an NCAA record; no other team managed even three in a row until Stanford did so in 2017.

Arena departed for the new men's professional league Major League Soccer in 1996, where he led D.C. United to three MLS Cup titles, two Supporters' Shields and a CONCACAF Champions League title. He was replaced by longtime assistant George Gelnovatch, who remains the coach today. Gelnovatch returned the team to the 1997 final, where they lost 2–0 to UCLA.

After a string of early-round exits in the late 1990s and early 2000s, the team returned to the College Cup in 2006 and the national championship game in 2009. Playing against the upstart Akron Zips that year, the Cavaliers were able to prevail in a penalty kick shootout to claim their sixth NCAA title, and their first national championship since the Arena years. Virginia added a seventh NCAA championship by defeating UCLA in a shootout in the 2014 tournament.

== Stadium ==
One of the earliest soccer-specific stadiums in college soccer, the Virginia Cavaliers men's soccer team plays their home matches at the 8,000-seater Klöckner Stadium. Since its opening in 1997, the Cavaliers have enjoyed some of the highest reported attendance figures in American college soccer.

The stadium has 3,600 grandstand seats along with an additional 3,400 grass seats. It is shared with the women's soccer team, as well as the men's and women's lacrosse teams.

== Rivalries ==
=== Maryland ===
Both UVA and Maryland have NCAA Championship programs in men's soccer. The Virginia Cavaliers have won seven NCAA Championships to Maryland's four. When they were both in the Atlantic Coast Conference, some cited the rivalry between the Cavaliers and the Maryland Terrapins as one of the most bitter rivalries in college soccer. In 2011, FirstPoint USA rated the rivalry as the third best rivalry in college soccer.

The Terrapins' departure to the Big Ten has put the annual rivalry on hiatus. Maryland recorded a 1–0 victory in the 2015 NCAA tournament and No. 12 Virginia dethroned No. 1 Maryland, 2–0, in a regular season game on September 2, 2019, helping Virginia to take over the No. 1 ranking weeks later.

=== Virginia Tech ===
Virginia Tech is another conference rival of the Virginia Cavaliers. The Cavaliers hold a 31-2-5 record record in the series and have gone unbeaten in 14 consecutive matches against the Hokies.

== Players ==
=== Current roster ===
As of September 1, 2024

Note: Flags indicate national team as defined under FIFA eligibility rules; some limited exceptions apply. Players may hold more than one non-FIFA nationality.

No.	Pos.	Nation	Player
0	GK	ENG	Tom Miles
00	GK	USA	Caleb Tunks
1	GK	USA	Joey Batrouni
2	DF	USA	Nick Dang
3	MF	USA	Max Talley
4	DF	GER	Paul Wiese
5	DF	USA	Austin Rome
6	MF	ITA	Umberto Pelà
7	FW	USA	Hayes Wood
8	MF	USA	Brendan Lambe
9	FW	DEN	AJ Smith
10	MF	USA	Daniel Mangarov
11	FW	ARG	Joaquín Brizuela
12	MF	SWE	Albin Gashi
13	FW	USA	Cesar Cordova
15	FW	USA	Triton Beauvois
16	MF	NZL	Willem Ebbinge
17	DF	CAN	Victor Akoum
18	FW	USA	Kome Ubogu
19	DF	USA	Reese Miller
20	FW	USA	Ignacio Alem

No.	Pos.	Nation	Player
21	DF	USA	Luc Mikula
22	MF	USA	Drew Serafino
23	FW	USA	David Okorie
24	MF	USA	Garrett Socas
25	DF	USA	Donovan Maryat
26	MF	USA	Amari Salley
27	MF	USA	Cameron Yriondo
28	MF	USA	Matthew Thissell
29	DF	USA	Yassine Rhoumar
30	GK	USA	Colin Gallagher
31	MF	USA	Luke Burns
32	DF	USA	Parker Sloan
33	DF	USA	Grant Howard
34	MF	USA	Miguel Kobby Adoboe
36	FW	USA	Anthony Faupel
37	DF	USA	Alex Parvu
38	MF	USA	Baka Kante
39	DF	USA	Jed Akwaboah
46	DF	USA	Matthew Hunter
99	GK	USA	Spencer Sanderson

=== Notable alumni ===
As of March 6, 2025

- (United States) George Gelnovatch (1983–1986) – Currently head coach of Virginia
- (United States) Jeff Agoos^{*} (1986–1990) – Currently president and general manager of Portland Thorns FC
- (United States) Kris Kelderman (1987–1990) – Currently head coach of University of Milwaukee
- (United States) Richie Williams (1988–1991) – Currently head coach of New England Revolution II
- (United States) Brad Agoos (1989–1992) – Currently head coach of Black Rock FC
- (United States) Clint Peay (1991–1995) – Currently assistant coach of New England Revolution
- (United States) Ben Olsen^{*} (1995–1997) – Currently head coach of Houston Dynamo FC
- (United States) Matt Chulis (1995–1998) – Currently associate head coach of Virginia
- (United States) Kyle Martino^{*} (1999–2002) – Currently soccer analyst for NBC Sports
- (United States) Kenny Arena (1999–2002) – Currently assistant coach of FC Cincinnati
- (United States) Hunter Freeman (2002–2004) – Currently Director of Scouting of FC Cincinnati
- (United States) Chris Tierney (2004–2007) – Currently Assistant Sporting Director of New England Revolution
- (United States) Brian Ownby (2008–2011) – Currently with Louisville City FC
- (United States) Calle Brown (2010–2014) – Currently with Northern Virginia FC
- (United States) Jake Rozhansky (2014–2015) – Currently with New York City FC II
- Peter Pearson^{*} (2014–2016) – Currently with Des Moines Menace and Saint Lucia international
- Derrick Etienne^{*} (2015) – Currently with Toronto FC and Haiti international
- (United States) Terrell Lowe (2016) – Currently with PDX FC
- (Spain) Sergi Nus (2016–2018) – Currently with South Georgia Tormenta FC
- (United States) Colin Shutler (2016–2020) – Currently with Orange County SC
- Joe Bell^{*} (2017–2019) – Currently with Viking FK and New Zealand international
- (United States) Henry Kessler ^{*} (2017–2019) – Currently with St. Louis City SC
- (Burundi) Irakoze Donasiyano^{*} (2017–2020) – Currently with Oakland Roots SC
- (United States) Daryl Dike^{*} (2018–2019) – Currently with West Bromwich Albion F.C.
- (United States) Daniel Steedman (2018–2019) – Currently with South Georgia Tormenta FC
- (United States) Bret Halsey (2018–2020) – Currently with FC Cincinnati
- (United States) Alex Rando (2020) – Currently with New York City FC
- Oliver Gerbig^{*} (2020–2021) – Currently with Henan F.C. and Hong Kong international
- (Brazil) Leo Afonso (2020–2023) – Currently with Inter Miami CF
- (United States) Aidan O'Connor – Currently with New York Red Bulls II

^{*} – Player has represented their country at the senior national team level

== Coaches ==
=== Current staff ===
Updated January 26, 2024

Position	Name
Head coach	George Gelnovatch
Associate Head Coach	Matt Chulis
Associate Head Coach	Adam Perron
Assistant coach	Jermaine Birriel

=== Head coaching history ===
Dates	Name
1941–1950	(United States) Lawrence Ludwig
1951–1953	(United States) Hugh Moomaw
1954	(United States) Wilson Fewster
1955–1957	(United States) Robert Sandell
1958–1965	(United States) Gene Corrigan
1966–1970	(United States) Gordon Burris
1971–1973	(United States) Jim Stephens
1974–1977	(United States) Larry Gross
1978–1995	(United States) Bruce Arena
1996–present	(United States) George Gelnovatch

== Honours ==
=== National ===
- NCAA Division I tournament
  - Winners (7): 1989 (Note: Title shared after the final ended in a tie, with no extra time played.), 1991, 1992, 1993, 1994, 2009, 2014
  - Runners-up (2): 1997, 2019

=== Conference ===
- ACC tournament
  - Winners (11): 1988, 1991, 1992, 1993, 1994, 1995, 1997, 2003, 2004, 2009, 2019
  - Runners-up (8): 1990, 1996, 1999, 2000, 2001, 2002, 2008, 2017
- ACC regular season
  - First Place (19): 1969, 1970, 1979, 1984, 1986, 1987, 1988, 1989, 1990, 1991, 1992, 1995, 1996, 1998, 2000, 2001, 2005, 2010, 2019
  - Runners-up (8): 1956, 1957, 1963, 1994, 1997, 1998, 2005, 2016
- Commonwealth Clash
  - Winners (31): 1975, 1977, 1978, 1979, 1980, 1981, 1982, 1983, 1984, 1985, 1986, 1989, 1990, 1991, 1992, 1993, 1994, 1995, 1996, 1997, 1998, 1999, 2006, 2008, 2009, 2010, 2012, 2014, 2015, 2017, 2019
  - Runners-up (2): 2004, 2005
- Virginia Intercollegiate Soccer Association tournament
  - Winners (9): 1961, 1962, 1963, 1970, 1977, 1981, 1982, 1984
  - Runners-up (3): 1964, 1967, 1971

== Seasons ==
Season	Coach	Overall	Conference	Standing	Postseason
Virginia (Independent) (1941–1953)
1941	Lawrence Ludwig	0–9–0			
1942	Lawrence Ludwig	4–2–1			
1943–1945	No team due to World War II				
1946	Lawrence Ludwig	1–3–1			
1947	Lawrence Ludwig	2–7–2			
1948	Lawrence Ludwig	3–7–1			
1949	Lawrence Ludwig	5–5–0			
1950	Lawrence Ludwig	4–5–1			
1951	Hugh Moomaw	1–5–2			
1952	Hugh Moomaw	5–2–2			
1953	Hugh Moomaw	4–4–1			
Virginia (ACC) (1953–present)
1954	Wilson Fewster	2–4–2	1–1–2	4th	
1955	Robert Sandell	3–5–2	1–2–1	3rd	
1956	Robert Sandell	6–3–0	3–1–0	2nd	
1957	Robert Sandell	5–2–1	2–1–1	2nd	
1958	Gene Corrigan	5–4–0	1–3–0	4th	
1959	Gene Corrigan	3–4–2	2–2–0	3rd	
1960	Gene Corrigan	3–7–0	1–3–0	4th	
1961	Gene Corrigan	9–3–0	1–3–0	4th	VISA Champions
1962	Gene Corrigan	5–4–1	1–3–0	4th	VISA Champions
1963	Gene Corrigan	7–2–1	2–1–1	2nd	VISA Champions
1964	Gene Corrigan	4–5–2	0–4–0	5th	
1965	Gene Corrigan	3–6–1	2–2–0	3rd	
1966	Gordon Burris	0–10–0	0–4–0	6th	
1967	Gordon Burris	3–9–0	0–4–0	6th	
1968	Gordon Burris	4–5–1	1–3–1	6th	
1969	Gordon Burris	9–1–2	4–0–1	1st	VISA co-champions NCAA First Round
1970	Gordon Burris	8–2–1	3–1–0	1st	VISA Champions
1971	Jim Stephens	7–5–1	1–3–1	6th	
1972	Jim Stephens	8–3–3	1–2–2	4th	
1973	Jim Stephens	6–7–0	1–4–0	6th	
1974	Larry Gross	5–4–3	3–2–0	3rd	
1975	Larry Gross	5–8–0	0–5–0	6th	
1976	Larry Gross	8–6–2	2–2–1	3rd	
1977	Larry Gross	12–6–1	2–3–0	4th	VISA Champions
1978	Bruce Arena	9–2–2	3–2–0	3rd	
1979	Bruce Arena	12–4–1	3–1–1	3rd	NCAA Second Round
1980	Bruce Arena	8–9–1	2–3–1	5th	
1981	Bruce Arena	10–6–2	2–4–0	6th	VISA Champions; NCAA Second Round
1982	Bruce Arena	16–2–2	3–1–2	3rd	VISA Champions; NCAA Second Round
1983	Bruce Arena	16–5–0	5–1–0	1st	NCAA College Cup
1984	Bruce Arena	19–3–1	6–0–0	1st	VISA Champions; NCAA Quarterfinals
1985	Bruce Arena	15–4–1	4–1–1	2nd	NCAA First Round
1986	Bruce Arena	17–2–2	6–0–0	1st	NCAA First Round
1987	Bruce Arena	17–3–2	5–0–1	1st	ACC Semifinals (Note: The ACC Men's Soccer Tournament began in 1987.); NCAA Second Round
1988	Bruce Arena	18–1–3	5–0–1	1st	ACC Champions; NCAA Quarterfinals
1989	Bruce Arena	21–2–2	5–0–1	1st	NCAA co-champions
1990	Bruce Arena	12–6–6	3–2–1	3rd	NCAA Third Round
1991	Bruce Arena	19–1–2	5–1–0	1st	ACC Champions; NCAA Champions
1992	Bruce Arena	21–2–1	5–1–0	1st	ACC Champions; NCAA Champions
1993	Bruce Arena	22–3–0	4–2–0	3rd	ACC Champions; NCAA Champions
1994	Bruce Arena	22–3–1	4–2–0	2nd	ACC Champions; NCAA Champions
1995	Bruce Arena	21–1–2	4–0–2	1st	ACC Champions; NCAA College Cup
1996	George Gelnovatch	16–3–3	4–0–2	1st	NCAA First Round
1997	George Gelnovatch	19–4–3	3–1–2	2nd	ACC Champions; NCAA Runners-Up
1998	George Gelnovatch	16–4–3	4–1–1	2nd	NCAA Quarterfinals
1999	George Gelnovatch	14–9–1	1–4–1	6th	NCAA Quarterfinals
2000	George Gelnovatch	17–6–1	5–1–0	1st	NCAA Quarterfinals
2001	George Gelnovatch	17–2–1	6–0–0	1st	NCAA Second Round
2002	George Gelnovatch	15–7–0	3–3–0	4th	NCAA Second Round
2003	George Gelnovatch	11–10–2	3–3–0	3rd	NCAA Third Round
2004	George Gelnovatch	18–5–1	4–3–1	4th	NCAA Quarterfinals
2005	George Gelnovatch	12–5–3	6–2–0	2nd	NCAA Third Round
2006	George Gelnovatch	17–4–1	5–3–0	3rd	NCAA College Cup
2007	George Gelnovatch	12–8–2	1–5–2	8th	NCAA Second Round
2008	George Gelnovatch	11–9–1	4–4–0	4th	NCAA Second Round
2009	George Gelnovatch	19–3–3	4–3–1	5th	NCAA Champions
2010	George Gelnovatch	11–6–3	2–4–2	6th	NCAA First Round
2011	George Gelnovatch	12–8–1	4–3–1	3rd	ACC Semifinals; NCAA First Round
2012	George Gelnovatch	10–7–1	3–4–1	6th	ACC Semifinals; NCAA Second Round
2013	George Gelnovatch	13–6–5	4–3–4	6th	ACC Runners-up; NCAA College Cup
2014	George Gelnovatch	13–6–4	3–3–2	4th, Coastal	ACC Quarterfinals; NCAA Champions
2015	George Gelnovatch	10–5–3	4–2–2	3rd, Coastal	ACC Quarterfinals; NCAA Second Round
2016	George Gelnovatch	10–3–5	4–2–3	2nd, Coastal	ACC Quarterfinals; NCAA Third Round
2017	George Gelnovatch	13–4–5	3–2–3	3rd, Coastal	ACC Runners-up; NCAA Second Round
2018	George Gelnovatch	10–4–3	3–2–2	3rd, Coastal	ACC First Round; NCAA Third Round
2019	George Gelnovatch	21–1–2	6–1–1	1st, Coastal	ACC Champions; NCAA Runners-Up
2020	George Gelnovatch	7–8–1	4–7–1	4th, North, 4th Coastal	ACC Semifinals
2021	George Gelnovatch	6–9–3	2–5–1	6th Coastal	ACC First Round
2022	George Gelnovatch	10–4–5	5–1–2	2nd Coastal	ACC Semifinals; NCAA Second Round
2023	George Gelnovatch	11–4–4	5–1–2	2nd Coastal	ACC Quarterfinals; NCAA Third Round
2024	George Gelnovatch	11–7–3	3–3–2	T-8th	ACC Semifinals; NCAA Third Round
Total:		TBD			
National champion Postseason invitational champion Conference regular season champion Conference regular season and conference tournament champion Division regular season champion Division regular season and conference tournament champion Conference tournament champion
