= 2011 NCAA Division I men's soccer season =

NCAA Division I
- Season: 2011
- Champions: North Carolina
- Top goalscorer: (Jamaica) Ashton Bennett (23)
- Highest attendance: 13,772; SDSU v. UCSB (September 23, 2011)

The 2011 NCAA Division I men's soccer season was the 53rd year of organized men's college soccer in the United States.

The season was divided into three parts; the regular season, which started with early season tournaments against intraconference opponents, before the second half of the regular season that featured interconference matches. The regular season was held from late August to early November 2011. In mid-November, the conference tournaments were held, and from mid-November to mid-December, the NCAA Tournament was held.

The national champion was the North Carolina Tar Heels whom won the title against the Charlotte 49ers. It was North Carolina's third national championship, and Charlotte's first ever appearance in an NCAA final of any sport.

== Season headlines ==
Throughout the course of the regular season, six different men's college soccer programs topped the rankings. The Connecticut Huskies were ranked first for four consecutive weeks, being the longest streak to do so in the season. At the end of the regular season, the New Mexico Lobos were the only college team in the nation to remain undefeated, winning 16 matches and only drawing twice.

== Changes from 2010 ==
=== Coaching changes ===
The following is a list of head coaching changes prior to the start of Division I men's soccer season.

College	Outgoing coach	Manner of departure	Incoming coach	Former position
Albany	Johan Aarnio	Fired	Trevor Gorman	Wright State assistant coach
Butler	Kelly Findley	Hired as N.C. State head coach	Paul Snape	Michigan associate coach
Canisius	Jim Hesch	Fired	Dermont McGrane	Niagara head coach
Creighton	Jamie Clark	Hired as Washington head coach	Elmar Bolowich	North Carolina head coach
Hartford	Dan Gaspar	Fired	TBA	
NC State	George Tarantini	Fired	Kelly Findley	Butler head coach
Niagara	Dermot McGrane	Hired as Canisius head coach	Chase Brooks	Dayton assistant coach
NJIT	Pedro Lopes	Fired	Cesar Markovic	Stony Brook head coach
North Carolina	Elmar Bolowich	Hired as Creighton head coach	Carlos Somoano	Interim coach
North Florida	Ray Bunch	Fired	Derek Marinatos	Furman associate coach
Rider	Russ Fager	Fired	Charlie Inverso	Rutgers assistant coach
St. Peter's	Guy Abrahamson	Fired	Julian Richens	Rider assistant coach
Stony Brook	Cesar Markovic	Hired has NJIT head coach	Ryan Anatol	South Florida assistant coach
Washington	Dean Wurzberger	Fired	Jamie Clark	Creighton head coach

== Season overview ==
=== Pre-season polls ===
Several American soccer outlets posted their own preseason top 25 rankings of what were believed to be the strongest men's collegiate soccer teams entering 2011.

NSCAA
Ranking	Team
1	Louisville
2	Akron
3	North Carolina
4	Maryland
5	SMU
6	UCLA
7	California
8	Connecticut
9	Michigan
10	Creighton
11	Brown
12	Notre Dame
13	William & Mary
14	UC Santa Barbara
15	Ohio State
16	South Carolina
17	Indiana
18	Penn State
19	Michigan State
20	Dartmouth
21	Butler
22	Virginia
23	Duke
24	UC Irvine
25	Boston College

Soccer America
Ranking	Team
1	Louisville
2	UCLA
3	North Carolina
4	Akron
5	Connecticut
6	Creighton
7	SMU
8	Maryland
9	Notre Dame
10	UC Santa Barbara
11	Virginia
12	Duke
13	Wake Forest
14	Brown
15	Ohio State
16	South Florida
17	West Virginia
18	Indiana
19	UCF
20	California
21	Monmouth
22	FGCU
23	Boston College
24	Loyola Marymount
25	Old Dominion

Fox Soccer/SBI
Ranking	Team
1	Louisville
2	UCLA
3	Akron
4	North Carolina
5	Maryland
6	SMU
7	Creighton
8	Connecticut
9	Duke
10	UC Santa Barbara
11	Virginia
12	Notre Dame
13	Ohio State
14	Wake Forest
15	West Virginia
16	Indiana
17	South Florida
18	Penn State
19	Boston College
20	Furman
21	California
22	Monmouth
23	William & Mary
24	Michigan
25	FGCU

== Regular season ==
=== Early season tournaments ===
Name	Dates	Num. teams	Champions
ShinDigz Soccer Festival	Aug. 18–20	2	Akron; Creighton
Cal State Northridge Labor Day Classic	Sept. 1–3	4	Akron
Hokie Invitational	Sept. 2–4	4	Virginia
Ocean State Classic	Sept. 2–4	4	Brown
VCU Invitational	Sept. 2–4	4	VCU
Brown Soccer Classic	Sept. 8–12	4	Brown
Hurricane Classic	Sept. 8–12	4	Connecticut
Stihl Soccer Classic	Sept. 8–12	4	Old Dominion
Akron Soccer Tournament	Sept. 16–18	4	Akron

=== Conference standings ===
Key

Team won conference tournament and automatic bid in the NCAA tournament.
Team earned a berth in NCAA tournament through an at-large bid
Qualified conference tournament, but did not qualify for the NCAA tournament.

=== Conference regular season and tournament winners ===
Thirty athletic conferences each end their regular seasons with a single-elimination tournament. The teams in each conference that win their regular season title are given the number one seed in each tournament. The winners of these tournaments receive automatic invitations to the 2011 NCAA Division I Men's Soccer Championship. The Ivy League does not have a conference tournament, instead giving their automatic invitation to their regular-season champion.

Conference	Regular Season Winner	Conference Tournament	Tournament Venue (City)	Tournament Winner
America East	Boston University	2011 America East Conference Men's Soccer Tournament	Nickerson Field (Boston, Massachusetts)	Stony Brook
Atlantic Coast	North Carolina	2011 ACC Men's Soccer Tournament	WakeMed Soccer Park (Cary, North Carolina)	North Carolina
Atlantic Ten	Charlotte	2011 Atlantic 10 Conference Men's Soccer Tournament	Hermann Stadium (St. Louis, Missouri)	Xavier
Atlantic Soccer	Florida Atlantic	No tournament		
Atlantic Sun	FGCU	2011 Atlantic Sun Conference Men's Soccer Tournament	Summers-Taylor Stadium (Johnson City, Tennessee)	FGCU
Big East	Blue: Marquette; Red: USF	2011 Big East Men's Soccer Tournament	Red Bull Arena (Harrison, New Jersey)	St. John's
Big South	Coastal Carolina	2011 Big South Men's Soccer Tournament	Greene-Harbison Field (Boiling Springs, North Carolina)	Liberty
Big Ten	Northwestern	2011 Big Ten Conference Men's Soccer Tournament	U-M Soccer Stadium (Ann Arbor, Michigan)	Northwestern
Big West	UC Irvine	2011 Big West Conference Men's Soccer Tournament	Anteater Stadium (Irvine, California)	UC Irvine
Colonial	James Madison	2011 CAA Men's Soccer Tournament	JMU Lacrosse/Soccer Complex (Harrisonburg, Virginia)	Delaware
Conference USA	UAB	2011 Conference USA Men's Soccer Tournament	Hurricane Soccer & Track Stadium (Tulsa, Oklahoma)	SMU
Horizon	Valparaiso	2011 Horizon League Men's Soccer Tournament	Eastgate Field (Valparaiso, Indiana)	Loyola
Ivy	Brown	No tournament		
Metro Atlantic	Fairfield	2011 MAAC Men's Soccer Tournament	Hess Field (Lake Buena Vista, Florida)	Fairfield Stags men's soccer
Mid-American	Akron	2011 MAC Men's Soccer Tournament	FirstEnergy Stadium (Akron, Ohio)	Northern Illinois
Missouri Valley	Missouri State	2011 Missouri Valley Conference Men's Soccer Tournament	Morrison Stadium (Omaha, Nebraska)	Creighton
Mountain Pacific	New Mexico	2011 MPSF Men's Soccer Tournament	CIBER Field (Denver, Colorado)	New Mexico
Northeast	Central Connecticut State	2011 Northeast Conference Men's Soccer Tournament	The Great Lawn (West Long Branch, New Jersey)	Monmouth
Pac-12	UCLA	2011 Pac-12 Conference Men's Soccer Tournament	Maloney Field (Stanford, California)	UCLA
Patriot	American	2011 Patriot League Men's Soccer Tournament	Tournament venue (Tournament City, State)	Colgate
Southern	UNC Greensboro	2011 Southern Conference Men's Soccer Tournament	Tournament venue (Tournament City, State)	Elon
Summit	Western Illinois	2011 The Summit League Men's Soccer Tournament	Tournament venue (Tournament City, State)	Western Illinois
West Coast	Saint Mary's	2011 West Coast Conference Men's Soccer Tournament	Tournament venue (Tournament City, State)	Saint Mary's

=== Major upsets ===
In this list, a "major upset" is defined by a team that's ranked 10 or more spots lower, or an unranked team that defeats a team ranked #15 or higher.

Date	Winner	Score	Loser
September 2	Providence	1–0	#11 Brown
September 4	UC Davis	2–1	#6 UCLA
September 11	Virginia Tech	1–0	#1 North Carolina
September 11	ESTU	2–0	#14 William & Mary
September 24	George Mason	1–0	#15 Old Dominion
October 5	#20 San Diego State	3–2	#3 Akron
October 7	#23 Virginia	2–1	#2 Maryland
October 12	Missouri State	1–0	#4 Creighton
October 17	Davidson	1–0	#2 North Carolina

=== Statistical leaders ===
==== Overall ====
Top scorers

Rank	Scorer	College	Goals
1	(Jamaica) Ashton Bennett	Coastal Carolina	23
2	(Jamaica) Darren Mattocks	Akron	21
3	(United States) Mark Sherrod	Memphis	19
4	(United States) Chandler Hoffman	UCLA	18
4	(United States) Gyasi Zardes	CSU Bakersfield	18
6	(Mexico) Luis Silva	UC Santa Barbara	17
6	(United States) Casey Townsend	Maryland	17
6	(United States) Andrew Wenger	Duke	17
9	(United States) Dom Dwyer	South Florida	16
9	(United States) Billy Schuler	North Carolina	16
9	(United States) Yannick Smith	Old Dominion	16

Last updated on December 23, 2011. Source: NCAA.com - Total Goals

Most assists

Rank	Scorer	College	Goals
1	(United States) Franklin Castellanos	Iona	14
2	(United States) Jesus Sanchez	CSU Bakersfield	13
3	(United States) Christopher Tweed-Kent	Duke	12
4	(United States) Scott Caldwell	Akron Zips	11
4	(Republic of Ireland) Liam Collins	Memphis	11
4	(Uruguay) Enzo Martinez	North Carolina	11
4	(United States) Juan Peralta	Vermont	11

Last updated on December 23, 2011. Source: NCAA.com - Total Assists

==== Per match ====
Points per game			Goals per game			Assists per game			Saves per game		
Player	School	PPG	Player	School	GPG	Player	School	APG	Player	School	SVPG
(Jamaica) Ashton Bennett	Coastal Carolina	2.41	(United States) Mark Sherrod	Memphis	1.06	(United States) Franklin Castellanos	Iona	0.74	(United States) John McCarthy	La Salle	7.94
(United States) Mark Sherrod	Memphis	2.33	(Jamaica) Ashton Bennett	Coastal Carolina	1.05	(United States) Juan Peralta	Vermont	0.65	(Finland) Lassi Hurskainen	UNC Asheville	6.68
(Haiti) Max Touloute	IPFW	2.19	(Jamaica) Darren Mattocks	Akron	0.95	(United States) Jesus Sanchez	CSU Bakersfield	0.62	(United States) Thomas Hand	Richmond	6.64
(Jamaica) Darren Mattocks	Akron	2.09	(United States) Gyasi Zardes	CSU Bakersfield	0.90	(Republic of Ireland) Liam Collins	Memphis	0.61	(United States) Taylor Feuerstein	VMI	6.50
(Mexico) Luis Silva	UC Santa Barbara	2.00	(United States) Yannick Smith	Old Dominion	0.84	(United States) Matt Lodge	Kentucky	0.59	(United States) Andrew D'Ottavi	Saint Joseph's	6.33

Save Percentage			Goals Against Average			Goalkeeper Min. Played			Saves		
Player	School	SV%	Player	School	GAA	Player	School	MP	Player	School	SV%
(United States) Brian Holt	Creighton	.923	(United States) Brian Holt	Creighton	.207				(United States) John McCarthy	La Salle	143
(United States) Graham Heydt	Lafayette	.908	(Jamaica) Andre Blake	Connecticut	.385				(Finland) Lassi Hurskainen	UNC Asheville	127
(United States) Ciaran Nugent	Lehigh	.896	(United States) Ciaran Nugent	Lehigh	.412				(United States) George Ellis	Manhattan	110
(Jamaica) Andre Blake	Connecticut	.888	(United States) Victor Rodriguez	New Mexico	.493				(United States) Jonathan Lester	San Jose State	105
(Canada) Darius Motazed	Saint Francis (Pa.)	.882	(United States) Graham Heydt	Lafayette	.504				(United States) Brendan Roslund	San Francisco	101

== NCAA tournament ==
=== College Cup – Hoover, Alabama ===
National semifinals December 9
1	North Carolina	2(3)
13	UCLA	2(1)
Charlotte	0(4)
2	Creighton	0(1)

National championship December 11
1	North Carolina	1
Charlotte	0

== Award winners ==
=== NSCAA/Continental Tire Men's NCAA Division I All-America Team ===
On December 9, 2011, the National Soccer Coaches Association of America released their All-American teams for the 2011 NCAA Division I men's soccer season. The list included a first, second and third team.

First team

Note: Flags indicate national team as defined under FIFA eligibility rules; some limited exceptions apply. Players may hold more than one non-FIFA nationality.

No.	Pos.	Nation	Player
1	GK	USA	Brian Holt (Creighton)
2	DF	USA	Chris Estridge (Indiana)
3	DF	USA	Matt Hedges (North Carolina)
4	DF	USA	Charles Rodriguez (Charlotte)
5	MF	USA	Miguel Ibarra (UC Irvine)
6	MF	URU	Enzo Martinez (North Carolina)
7	MF	MEX	Luis Silva (UC Santa Barbara)
8	FW	JAM	Ashton Bennett (Coastal Carolina)
9	FW	USA	Ethan Finlay (Creighton)
10	FW	USA	Billy Schuler (North Carolina)
11	FW	USA	Andrew Wenger (Duke)

Second team

Note: Flags indicate national team as defined under FIFA eligibility rules; some limited exceptions apply. Players may hold more than one non-FIFA nationality.

No.	Pos.	Nation	Player
1	GK	USA	Brian Rowe (UCLA)
2	DF	USA	R. J. Allen (Monmouth)
3	DF	USA	Andrew Duran (Creighton)
4	DF	USA	Kyle Venter (New Mexico)
5	MF	USA	Carlos Alvarez (Connecticut)
6	MF	USA	Greg Jordan (Creighton)
7	MF	USA	Lance Rozeboom (New Mexico)
8	MF	ENG	Paul Wyatt (James Madison)
9	FW	USA	Dom Dwyer (South Florida)
10	FW	GHA	Evans Frimpong (Delaware)
11	FW	JAM	Darren Mattocks (Akron)
12	FW	USA	Casey Townsend (Maryland)

Third team

Note: Flags indicate national team as defined under FIFA eligibility rules; some limited exceptions apply. Players may hold more than one non-FIFA nationality.

No.	Pos.	Nation	Player
1	GK	JAM	Andre Blake (Connecticut)
2	DF	USA	Austin Berry (Louisville)
3	DF	USA	Eric Schoenle (West Virginia)
4	DF	USA	Walker Zimmerman (Furman)
5	MF	USA	Scott Caldwell (Akron)
6	MF	COL	Jonathan Mendoza (Stetson)
7	MF	BRA	Pedro Ribeiro (Coastal Carolina)
8	MF	USA	John Stertzer (Maryland)
9	FW	USA	Chandler Hoffman (UCLA)
10	FW	USA	Mark Sherrod (Memphis)
11	FW	JAM	Yannick Smith (Old Dominion)
12	FW	USA	Gyasi Zardes (CSU Bakersfield)

== See also ==
- College soccer
- 2011 in American soccer
- 2011 NCAA Division I Men's Soccer Championship
