= 2011 Delaware Fightin' Blue Hens men's soccer team =

Delaware Fightin' Blue Hens
2011 season
- Athletic Director: (United States) Bernard Muir
- Head coach: (United States) Ian Hennessy
- CAA Regular Season: 4th
- CAA Tournament: Champions
- College Cup: Second round
Home colors	Away colors

The 2011 NCAA Division I men's soccer season was the 41st year of college soccer for the Delaware Fightin' Blue Hens men's soccer program. The Blue Hens competed in the Colonial Athletic Association.

The 2011 season was one of the more successful season in the program's history, as the Blue Hens won their first CAA Tournament championship ever, and competed in the NCAA Division I Men's Soccer Championship for the first time since 1970. In the NCAA Tournament, the Blue Hens defeated the Virginia Cavaliers, 1–0, in extra time, to advance to the second round of the tournament. In the second round, the Blue Hens fell to the UCLA Bruins off an 84th-minute goal giving UCLA a 1–0 victory.

== Background ==
During the 2010 season, the Blue Hens finished fifth in the CAA with a conference record of 5–4–2, and an overall record o

== Match results ==
=== Legend ===
Item	Description
W	Win
L	Loss
T	Tie
¤	Conference match
No. (##)	Opponent's ranking

=== Regular season ===
Game	Date	Opponents	Venue	Result	Score F–A	Goalscorers	Attendance	Overall	Conference	Ref.
1	Aug 26, 2011	U-Mass	H	W	3–0	Unknown	300	1–0–0	0–0–0	
2	Sep 01, 2011	Seton Hall	A	T	3–3	Unknown	1,218	1–0–1	0–0–0	
3	Sep 10, 2011	Canisius	A	W	1–0	Unknown	538	2–0–1	0–0–0	
4	Sep 14, 2011	Navy	A	W	5–3	Unknown	510	3–0–1	0–0–0	
5	Sep 14, 2011	Columbia	H	W	1–0	Unknown	325	4–0–1	0–0–0	
6	Sep 21, 2011	Saint Peter's	A	W	4–1	Unknown	178	5–0–1	0–0–0	
7	Sep 24, 2011	Georgia State¤	H	W	1–0	Unknown	500	6–0–1	1–0–0	
8	Oct 01, 2011	#15 Old Dominion¤	A	L	0–2	Unknown	223	6–1–1	1–1–0	
9	Oct 05, 2011	Northeastern¤	H	W	2–1	Unknown	250	7–1–1	2–1–0	
10	Oct 09, 2011	James Madison¤	H	L	2–3	Unknown	600	7–2–1	2–2–0	
11	Oct 12, 2011	Drexel¤	A	L	1–2	Unknown	103	7–3–1	2–3–0	
12	Oct 16, 2011	Hofstra¤	H	W	3–2	Unknown	320	8–3–1	3–3–0	
13	Oct 19, 2011	George Mason¤	H	W	2–1	Unknown	375	9–3–1	4–3–0	
14	Oct 22, 2011	William & Mary¤	H	W	2–0	Frimpong (2)	600	10–3–1	5–3–0	
15	Oct 26, 2011	Towson¤	A	T	2–2	Gimenez, Stone	148	10–3–2	5–3–1	
16	Oct 29, 2011	UNC Wilmington¤	A	W	2–1	Dineen, Mediate	326	11–3–2	6–3–1	
17	Nov 1, 2011	Lafayette	H	L	0–3					
18	Nov 5, 2011	VCU¤	A	L	1–3	Mediate				

=== CAA Tournament ===
Round	Date	Opponents	Venue	Result	Score F–A	Goalscorers	Attendance	Overall	Conference	Ref.
QF	Nov 10, 2011	Northeastern	H	T	0–0 (4–3 pen.)	—	375	11–5–3	6–4–2	
SF	Nov 11, 2011	#18 James Madison	A	T	2–2 (5–4 pen.)	Dineen, Frimpong	1,075	11–5–4	6–4–3	
F	Nov 13, 2011	#9 Old Dominion	A	W	2–1	Mediate, Oakes (o.g.)	279	12–5–4	7–4–3	

=== NCAA Tournament ===
Round	Date	Opponents	Venue	Result	Score F–A	Goalscorers	Attendance	Overall	Conference	Ref.
R1	Nov 17, 2011	#25 Virginia	A	W	1–0	Dineen	588	13–5–4	7–4–3	
R2	Nov 20, 2011	#18 UCLA	A	L	0–1		381	13–6–4	7–4–3	

== Standings ==
2011 CAA men's soccer standings
	Conference									Overall						
	GP	W	L	T	GF	GA	GD	PTS		GP	W	L	T	GF	GA	GD
#12 James Madison†	11	8	3	0	17	12	+5	24		17	12	4	1	27	20	+7
#18 Old Dominion	11	7	3	1	26	16	+10	22		16	11	4	1	42	22	+20
William & Mary	11	7	4	0	4	0	+4	21		18	10	8	0	4	8	–4
Delaware*	11	6	4	1	0	0	0	19		17	11	5	2	11	6	+5
Northeastern	11	6	4	1	0	0	0	19		18	10	6	2	7	4	+4
Georgia State	11	6	5	0	12	9	+3	18	^{Note 1}	19	12	6	1	26	14	+12
VCU	11	6	5	0	15	14	+1	18		20	11	9	0	34	24	+10
Drexel	11	4	5	2	11	17	−6	14		18	5	10	3	14	24	−10
George Mason	11	4	6	1	17	14	+3	13		18	7	8	3	37	27	+10
Hofstra	11	4	7	0	18	23	−5	12		18	7	10	1	25	32	−7
UNC Wilmington	11	2	8	1	12	16	−4	7		18	4	12	2	20	29	−9
Towson	11	2	8	1	14	25	−11	7		17	3	11	2	20	41	–21
Championship: † indicates conference regular season champion * indicates conference tournament champion Georgia State beat VCU in the first tiebreaker, which was head-to-head record. Current rankings: CAASports.com

== Team ==
=== Roster ===
As of October 31, 2011

Note: Flags indicate national team as defined under FIFA eligibility rules; some limited exceptions apply. Players may hold more than one non-FIFA nationality.

No.	Pos.	Nation	Player
00	GK	USA	Brandon Paul
0	GK	USA	Bill Boyer
1	GK	USA	Kris Devaux
2	MF	USA	Kyle Ellis
3	DF	GER	Tobias Müller
4	DF	ESP	Ignacio Martín
5	MF	IRL	Darren O'Connor
6	DF	IRL	John Dineen
7	MF	USA	Drew Colletti
9	MF	USA	Ben Raymond
10	MF	GHA	Evans Frimpong
11	FW	ESP	Roberto Gimenez
12	DF	USA	Kyle Nuel

No.	Pos.	Nation	Player
14	DF	ISR	Eyal Gruber
15	DF	FRA	Yoan Fontaine
17	DF	USA	Mark Garrity
18	MF	USA	Vincent Mediate
19	FW	USA	Chas Wilson
21	DF	USA	Mike Stone
22	DF	GHA	Prince Nartey
23	DF	USA	Evan Reed
24	DF	USA	Jesse Lyons
26	MF	USA	Luke Oostdyk
27	FW	USA	Kyle Bruno
33	GK	USA	Justin Orton
34	GK	USA	Jay Lupas

== See also ==
- Delaware Fightin' Blue Hens
  - Delaware Fightin' Blue Hens men's soccer
- 2011 NCAA Division I men's soccer season
  - 2011 Colonial Athletic Association men's soccer season
  - 2011 CAA Men's Soccer Tournament
  - 2011 NCAA Division I Men's Soccer Championship
