= 2011 CAA men's soccer tournament =

Tournament details
- Country: United States
- Teams: 6

Final positions
- Champions: Delaware
- Runner-up: Old Dominion

Tournament statistics
- Matches played: 5
- Goals scored: 17 (3.4 per match)
- Top goal scorer(s): Tim Hopkinson, Patrick Innes, Jordan LeBlanc (2)

The 2011 CAA men's soccer tournament, known as the 2011 Virginia 529 CAA Men's Soccer Championship for sponsorship reasons, was the 29th edition of the CAA Men's Soccer Tournament, which determines the conference's automatic berth into the 2011 NCAA Division I Men's Soccer Championship. Played from November 10–13, 2011 at James Madison University's Soccer Complex, the University of Delaware Fighting Blue Hens defeated the Old Dominion University Monarchs to their first ever CAA Men's Soccer Tournament since joining the conference. For Delaware, the title clinched their third ever berth into the tournament, and their first since 1970.

The tournament was hosted by the James Madison Dukes, as they won the regular season championship.

== Qualification ==
For the second straight season, six teams from the twelve team group qualified into the CAA Tournament. Though the Virginia Commonwealth University Rams and Georgia State University Panthers were tied for the final tournament berth, the Panthers edged the Rams in the first tiebreaker, head-to-head record.

2011 CAA men's soccer standings
	Conference									Overall						
	GP	W	L	T	GF	GA	GD	PTS		GP	W	L	T	GF	GA	GD
#12 James Madison†	11	8	3	0	17	12	+5	24		17	12	4	1	27	20	+7
#18 Old Dominion	11	7	3	1	26	16	+10	22		16	11	4	1	42	22	+20
William & Mary	11	7	4	0	4	0	+4	21		18	10	8	0	4	8	–4
Delaware*	11	6	4	1	0	0	0	19		17	11	5	2	11	6	+5
Northeastern	11	6	4	1	0	0	0	19		18	10	6	2	7	4	+4
Georgia State	11	6	5	0	12	9	+3	18	^{Note 1}	19	12	6	1	26	14	+12
VCU	11	6	5	0	15	14	+1	18		20	11	9	0	34	24	+10
Drexel	11	4	5	2	11	17	−6	14		18	5	10	3	14	24	−10
George Mason	11	4	6	1	17	14	+3	13		18	7	8	3	37	27	+10
Hofstra	11	4	7	0	18	23	−5	12		18	7	10	1	25	32	−7
UNC Wilmington	11	2	8	1	12	16	−4	7		18	4	12	2	20	29	−9
Towson	11	2	8	1	14	25	−11	7		17	3	11	2	20	41	–21
Championship: † indicates conference regular season champion * indicates conference tournament champion Georgia State beat VCU in the first tiebreaker, which was head-to-head record. Current rankings: CAASports.com

== Bracket ==
Play-in round
5	Northeastern	0
4	Delaware	0 (a.e.t.)
3	William & Mary	1
6	Georgia State	2

Semifinals
1	James Madison	2
4	Delaware	2 (a.e.t.)
2	Old Dominion	5
6	Georgia State	3

Championship
4	Delaware	2
2	Old Dominion	1

== Schedule ==
The higher seed, as well as the home team, is listed on the right.

=== Play-in round ===
November 10, 2011
19:30 ET

Georgia State	2–1	William & Mary
McGill 65'; Scott 77'	Report	Abrigo 50'

Albert-Daly Field
Williamsburg, Virginia
Attendance: TBA
Referee: Bill Kingsley

November 10, 2011
19:30 ET

Northeastern	0–0 (a.e.t.)	Delaware
	Report
Penalties
Phataraprasit (penalty missed); Burnham (penalty scored); Braude (penalty scored); Kennedy (penalty missed); Semerene (penalty scored); Rumph (penalty missed)	3–4	O'Connor (penalty missed); Mediate (penalty scored); Frimpong (penalty missed); Gimenez (penalty scored); Dineen (penalty scored); Nartey (penalty scored)

Delaware Mini-Stadium
Newark, Delaware
Attendance: 328
Referee: Mike Stutt

=== Semifinals ===
November 11, 2011
17:00 ET

Georgia State	3–5	Old Dominion
Gordon 38'; Lumpkin 62'; Vania 87'	Report	De John 19'; Hopkinson 36', 75'; LeBlanc 79'; Asante 90'

JMU Soccer Complex
Harrisonburg, Virginia
Attendance: 1,075
Referee: Steve Ankiel

November 11, 2011
19:30 ET

Delaware	2–2 (a.e.t.)	James Madison
Dineen 21'; Frimpong 37'	Report	Innes 19', 82'
Penalties
O'Connor (penalty scored); Mediate (penalty missed); Reed (penalty missed); Nuel (penalty scored); Dineen (penalty scored); Nartey (penalty scored); Frimpong (penalty missed); Wilson (penalty scored)	5–4	Innes (penalty missed); McLaughlin (penalty scored); Roberts-Bailey (penalty missed); Bastidas (penalty scored); Barden (penalty scored); Whitebread (penalty scored); Gannon (penalty missed); Simpson (penalty missed)

JMU Soccer Complex
Harrisonburg, Virginia
Attendance: 1,075
Referee: Andrew Chapin

=== CAA Championship ===
November 13, 2011
13:00 ET

Delaware	2–1	Old Dominion
Mediate 34'; Oakes 65' (o.g.)	Report	LeBlanc 20'

JMU Soccer Complex, Harrisonburg
Attendance: 279
Referee: Daniel Fitzgerald

== Statistics ==
=== Top goalscorers ===
Rank	Player	Team	Goals
1	(England) Tim Hopkinson	Old Dominion	2
1	(United States) Patrick Innes	James Madison	2
1	(United States) Jordan LeBlanc	Old Dominion	2
4	(United States) Nicholas Abrigo	William & Mary	1
4	(Ghana) Gideon Asante	Old Dominion	1
4	(United States) Alex DeJohn	Old Dominion	1
4	(Republic of Ireland) John Dineen	Delaware	1
4	(Ghana) Evans Frimpong	Delaware	1
4	(Canada) Gimel Gordon	Georgia State	1
4	(United States) Ayokunle Lumpkin	Georgia State	1
4	(United States) Vincent Mediate	Delaware	1
4	(Republic of Ireland) Stephen McGill	Georgia State	1
4	(United States) Evan Scott	Georgia State	1
4	(United States) Peter Vania	Georgia State	1

== See also ==
- Colonial Athletic Association
- 2011 Colonial Athletic Association men's soccer season
- 2011 in American soccer
- 2011 NCAA Division I Men's Soccer Championship
- 2011 NCAA Division I men's soccer season
