= CF Molina =

Spanish football club

Molina
- Full name: Club de Fútbol Molina
- Founded: 2009
- Dissolved: 2018
- Ground: Sánchez Cánovas, Molina de Segura, Murcia, Spain
- Capacity: 4,000
- 2017–18: Preferente Autonómica, 6th of 18
Home colours	Away colours

Club de Fútbol Molina was a football team based in Molina de Segura, Murcia, Spain. Founded in 2009, they were dissolved in 2018 after Independiente de Ceutí FC took their place.

== History ==
CD Molinense was dissolved in the summer of 2009 and Club de Futbol Molina was founded. The club immediately bought the seat of Archena Atlético, achieving promotion to Tercera División in its first season.

In 2018, CF Molina's place was taken by Independiente de Ceutí FC. Their reserve team at the time, Club de Fútbol Molina Promesas, remained active and later became Unión Molinense CF.

== Season to season ==
Season	Tier	Division	Place	Copa del Rey
2009–10	5	Terr. Pref.	2nd	
2010–11	4	3ª	9th	
2011–12	4	3ª	15th	
2012–13	4	3ª	8th	
2013–14	4	3ª	16th	
2014–15	4	3ª	17th	
2015–16	5	Pref. Aut.	13th	
2016–17	5	Pref. Aut.	6th	
2017–18	5	Pref. Aut.	9th	

- 5 seasons in Tercera División
