= 2011 Colonial Athletic Association men's soccer season =

Colonial Athletic Association
- Season: 2011
- Champions: Delaware
- Premiers: James Madison
- NCAA Tournament: Delaware; Georgia State; James Madison; Old Dominion
- Top goalscorer: Yannick Smith (15)
- Biggest home win: ODU 4–0 VCU
- Biggest away win: Hofstra 0–3 VCU; W&M 0–3 ODU
- Highest scoring: GMU 5–3 TOW
- Longest winning run: Old Dominion (3)
- Longest unbeaten run: Delaware (5)
- Average attendance: 410

The 2011 Colonial Athletic Association men's soccer season was the 29th season of men's college soccer in the Colonial Athletic Association, played from August 25, 2011 until November 3, 2011. The season marked the first time in 11 years that the James Madison Dukes won the regular season title, amassing a conference record of 8–3–0, with a 12–4–1 overall record. The regular season culminated with the tournament, which was won by the Delaware Blue Hens, making it their first conference championship in 40 years.

Four teams qualified for the NCAA Division I Men's Soccer Championship, making it the largest representation by the conference in the tournament's history. Delaware automatically qualified for the tournament by winning the conference tournament, while James Madison, Old Dominion and Georgia State all entered the tournament via at-large berths. These three teams were the finalists and semifinalists in the CAA Tournament.

== Colleges ==
=== Head coaching changes ===
There were no head coaching changes during the 2010–11 offseason.

== Preseason ==
=== Coaches poll ===
	CAA Coaches' Poll	
1.	Old Dominion (6)	112
2.	VCU (1)	102
3.	William & Mary (4)	90
4.	George Mason	87
5.	UNC Wilmington	80
6.	Northeastern (1)	79
7.	Hofstra	67
8.	James Madison	53
9.	Drexel	40
10.	Towson	37
11.	Delaware	30
12.	Georgia State	15

== Standings ==
2011 CAA men's soccer standings
	Conference									Overall						
	GP	W	L	T	GF	GA	GD	PTS		GP	W	L	T	GF	GA	GD
#12 James Madison†	11	8	3	0	17	12	+5	24		17	12	4	1	27	20	+7
#18 Old Dominion	11	7	3	1	26	16	+10	22		16	11	4	1	42	22	+20
William & Mary	11	7	4	0	4	0	+4	21		18	10	8	0	4	8	–4
Delaware*	11	6	4	1	0	0	0	19		17	11	5	2	11	6	+5
Northeastern	11	6	4	1	0	0	0	19		18	10	6	2	7	4	+4
Georgia State	11	6	5	0	12	9	+3	18	^{Note 1}	19	12	6	1	26	14	+12
VCU	11	6	5	0	15	14	+1	18		20	11	9	0	34	24	+10
Drexel	11	4	5	2	11	17	−6	14		18	5	10	3	14	24	−10
George Mason	11	4	6	1	17	14	+3	13		18	7	8	3	37	27	+10
Hofstra	11	4	7	0	18	23	−5	12		18	7	10	1	25	32	−7
UNC Wilmington	11	2	8	1	12	16	−4	7		18	4	12	2	20	29	−9
Towson	11	2	8	1	14	25	−11	7		17	3	11	2	20	41	–21
Championship: † indicates conference regular season champion * indicates conference tournament champion Georgia State beat VCU in the first tiebreaker, which was head-to-head record. Current rankings: CAASports.com

== Tournament ==
The tournament will be hosted by whoever wins the regular season title. Right now, either James Madison or Old Dominion will host the tournament, depending on their regular season outcomes.

== Results ==
Home \ Away	DEL	DRE	GMU	GSU	HOF	JMU	NCW	NOR	ODU	TOW	VCU	W&M
Delaware Fighting Blue Hens			2–1	1–0	3–2	2–3		2–1				2–0
Drexel Dragons	2–1				0–1	2–0				2–0	2–1	0–2
George Mason Patriots		0–0						4–1	1–0	5–3		
Georgia State Panthers		0–0			1–0	0–1	1–0					1–0
Hofstra Pride						3–0	2–1				0–3	
James Madison Dukes			2–1				1–0	2–0	3–2	3–0		
UNC Wilmington Seahawks	1–2	2–0	4–2								0–1	0–1
Northeastern Huskies									2–0		2–1	
Old Dominion Monarchs	2–0	1–1		3–2	4–1		3–2				4–0	
Towson Tigers	2–2			1–0	2–3		2–1		2–4			0–1
VCU Rams	3–1		1–0	0–1		2–1				3–2		0–1
William & Mary Tribe			1–0		3–2	0–1			0–3			

Updated to match(es) played on October 31, 2011. Source: official website
Legend: Blue = home team win; Yellow = draw; Red = away team win.

== Top goalscorers ==
Pos	Player	College	Goals
1	Yannick Smith	Old Dominion	15
2	Patrick Innes	James Madison	11
2	Evans Frimpong	Delaware	11
4	Roberto Gimenez	Delaware	10
5	Jason Johnson	VCU	9
5	Taylor Morgan	George Mason	9
7	Tim Hopkinson	Old Dominion	8
7	Nicholas Abrigo	William & Mary	8
9	Dante Marini	Northeastern	7
10	Paul Wyatt	James Madison	6
10	Gideon Asante	Old Dominion	6
10	Evan Scott	Georgia State	6
10	Kyle Ellis	Delaware	6
10	Yoyo Mwila	VCU	6

Last updated: October 31, 2011
Source: NMN Athletics

== See also ==
- Colonial Athletic Association
- 2011 CAA Men's Soccer Tournament
- 2011 NCAA Division I men's soccer season
- 2011 NCAA Division I Men's Soccer Championship
