= 2011 MPSF men's soccer tournament =

2011 CAA men's soccer tournament
Tournament details
- Country: United States
- Teams: 6

Final positions
- Champions: New Mexico
- Runners-up: CSU Bakersfield

Tournament statistics
- Matches played: 5
- Goals scored: 14 (2.8 per match)

The 2011 MPSF Tournament was the postseason tournament of the Mountain Pacific Sports Federation to determine the MPSF's champion and automatic berth into the 2011 NCAA Division I Men's Soccer Championship.

== Bracket ==
Quarterfinals
4	Sacramento State	2
5	San Jose State	4
3	Air Force	2
6	Denver	0

Semifinals
1	New Mexico	3
5	San Jose State	0
2	CSU Bakersfield (a.e.t.)	1
3	Air Force	0

MPSF Championship
1	New Mexico (pen.)	1 (3)
2	CSU Bakersfield	1 (1)

The higher seed, as well as the home team, is listed on the right.

=== Play-in round ===
November 10, 2011
17:00 MT

San Jose State	4 – 2	Sacramento State
Ochoa 58'; Murrillo 71'; Sanchez 73'; Cashmere 80'	Report	Alvarez 16'; Strikowski 59'

CIBER Field
Denver, Colorado
Attendance: Not reported
Referee: Ali Hacock

November 10, 2011
19:30 MT

Air Force	2 – 0	Denver
Gestchow 4'; Durr 90'	Report

CIBER Field
Denver, Colorado
Attendance: 180
Referee: Alex Gorin

=== Semifinals ===
November 11, 2011
17:00 ET

San Jose	0 – 3	#1 New Mexico
	Report	Venter 37'; Mora Delgado 59'; Sandoval 64'

CIBER Field
Denver, Colorado
Attendance: 276
Referee: Rene Nuñez

November 11, 2011
19:30 ET

Air Force	0 – 1 (a.e.t.)	CSU Bakersfield
	Report	Peña 95'

CIBER Field
Denver, Colorado
Attendance: 276
Referee: Younes Marrakchi

=== MPSF Championship ===
November 13, 2011
13:00 ET

CSU Bakersfield	1 – 1 (a.e.t.)	#1 New Mexico
Zardes 84'	Report	Luedtke 85' (o.g.)
Penalties
Hinojosa (penalty missed); Menjivar (penalty missed); Sanchez (penalty missed); Taylor (penalty scored)	1 – 3	Rozeboom (penalty missed); Green (penalty scored); Smith (penalty scored); Sandoval (penalty scored)

CIBER Field
Denver, Colorado
Attendance: 239
Referee: Misail Tsapos

== See also ==
- Mountain Pacific Sports Federation
- 2011 Mountain Pacific Sports Federation men's soccer season
- 2011 in American soccer
- 2011 NCAA Division I Men's Soccer Championship
- 2011 NCAA Division I men's soccer season
