= Independiente de Ceutí FC =

Independiente Ceutí
- Full name: Independiente de Ceutí Fútbol Club
- Founded: 2017
- Ground: Miguel Indurain, Ceutí, Murcia, Spain
- Capacity: 4,000
- Chairman: José Carrillo Torregrosa
- Manager: Francisco Javier García Serrano
- League: Primera Autonómica – Group 2
- 2025–26: Primera Autonómica – Group 2, 14th of 16
Home colours	Away colours

Independiente de Ceutí Fútbol Club, sometimes known as Ceutí Fútbol Club, is a football team based in Ceutí, Murcia, Spain. Founded in 2017, the team plays in Primera Autonómica – Group 2, holding home games at the Complejo Deportivo Miguel Indurain.

== History ==
CD Molinense was dissolved in the summer of 2009 and CF Molina was founded. The club immediately bought the seat of Archena Atlético, achieving promotion to Tercera División in its first season.

In 2018, CF Molina's place was taken by Independiente de Ceutí Fútbol Club. Their reserve team at the time, Club de Fútbol Molina Promesas, remained active and later became Unión Molinense CF.

== Season to season ==
Season	Tier	Division	Place	Copa del Rey
2018–19	5	Pref. Aut.	18th	
2019–20	6	1ª Aut.	8th	
2020–21	5	Pref. Aut.	10th	
2021–22	6	Pref. Aut.	15th	
2022–23	7	1ª Aut.	8th	
2023–24	7	1ª Aut.	11th	
2024–25	7	1ª Aut.	14th	
2025–26	7	1ª Aut.		
