= Trevor Gorman =

American soccer coach (born 1982)

Current position
- Title: Head coach
- Team: Albany Great Danes
- Conference: America East Conference

Biographical details
- Born: September 1982 (age 44); Pennsylvania, United States

Playing career
- 2001–2004: Penn State Nittany Lions
- Position: Midfielder

Coaching career (HC unless noted)
- 2007–09: Dartmouth Big Green (assistant)
- 2010: Wright State Raiders (assistant)
- 2011–present: Albany Great Danes

Trevor Gorman is the head coach of the Albany Great Danes men's soccer team; a position he has held since 2011. Prior to his position at Albany, he served as an assistant coach for the Wright State Raiders and Dartmouth Big Green. In 2016, the Great Danes won the America East Conference men's soccer championship for the first time, and qualified for the NCAA tournament. His father, Barry Gorman, is Penn State's most successful soccer coach.

== Head coaching record ==
Record table
Season	Team	Overall	Conference	Standing	Postseason
Albany Great Danes (America East Conference) (2011–present)
2011	Albany	6–10–3	1–3–3	6th	
2012	Albany	6–11	3–4	5th	
2013	Albany	6–11–4	3–3–1	T-4th	
2014	Albany	4–9–6	2–4–1	5th	
2015	Albany	10–8–1	5–2	1st	
2016	Albany	13–6–2	4–2–1	T-2nd	
2017	Albany	14–5–3	4–2–1	T-3rd	
2018	Albany	8–10	3–4	6th	
2019	Albany	9–7–1	4–3	4th	
2020–2021	Albany	3–5–1	2–4	4th	
2021	Albany	10–7–1	4–3–1	3rd	
2022	Albany	6–8–6	3–1–3	4th	
2023	Albany	5–11–1	1–5–1	7th	
2024	Albany	4–12–2	1–5–1	8th	
2025	Albany	5–6–6	3–2–2	3rd	
Albany:		109–126–36 (.469)	43–47–15 (.481)		
Total:		109–126–36 (.469)			
National champion Postseason invitational champion Conference regular season champion Conference regular season and conference tournament champion Division regular season champion Division regular season and conference tournament champion Conference tournament champion
