= Judson University =

Private university in Elgin, Illinois, US

Coordinates: 42°3′59″N 88°17′43″W

- Former name: Judson College (1963–2007)
- Motto: Christus Lux Mundi (Latin)
- Motto in English: Christ, the Light of the World
- Type: Private university
- Established: 1913; 113 years ago (established in its current location in 1963)
- Accreditation: HLC
- Religious affiliation: American Baptist Churches USA
- Academic affiliations: CCCU; CIC; NAICU
- President: Gene C. Crume, Jr.
- Students: 1,058 (fall 2023)
- Undergraduates: 793 (fall 2023)
- Postgraduates: 265 (fall 2023)
- Location: Elgin, Illinois, United States
- Campus: 90 acres (36 ha); Suburban
- Colors: Navy Blue & Gold
- Nickname: Eagles
- Sporting affiliations: NAIA – CCAC
- Mascot: Eagle
- Website: judsonu.edu
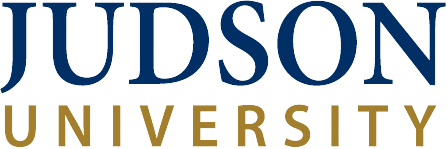

Judson University is a private university in Elgin, Illinois, United States. It is affiliated with the American Baptist Churches USA. Judson was formed out of the liberal arts component of Northern Baptist Theological Seminary. When the seminary moved from Chicago to Lombard, Illinois, it was decided to make the college separate from the seminary. Originally known as Judson College, it was named after Adoniram Judson, the first American Baptist missionary to foreign shores. The university has campuses in Elgin and Rockford, Illinois, and a student body of approximately 1,300. Judson College became Judson University on August 28, 2007.

== History ==
Judson was formed out of the liberal arts component of Northern Baptist Theological Seminary (NBTS), which was founded in 1913. In the early 1960s, when the seminary portion of Northern moved from Chicago to Lombard it was decided to make the college an independent entity. Under the guidance of Benjamin P. Browne, the college and seminary president, Judson College was founded along the shores of the Fox River in Elgin in 1963. The college was named after Adoniram Judson, the first American missionary abroad, who went to Burma in 1813 and would spend 37 years overseas.

The land where Judson College was founded was an estate belonging to Margaret Deuterman, a doctor's widow. Deuterman was ready to sell the estate at $150,000 to a business that was planning to convert it into an entertainment club, but she was willing to listen to Browne and the other men from NBTS in their effort to use the estate to build the college. Mrs. Deuterman agreed to sell the estate for $100,000, and all she required was $500 earnest money to secure the property. No one else had any cash, except for Browne, who had $5. But Amos Barton, a college trustee who owned a construction business, had his company checkbook, and he agreed to loan the college the $500 needed to secure the property. The college received a charter from the State of Illinois, dated March 11, 1963.

Judson College was financially strapped for most of its first ten years of existence and faced fierce opposition from the trustees of NBTS, other Baptist seminaries, other Baptist colleges, and even from the leadership of the American Baptists. Despite this, enrollment continued to grow, and by its fifth year, Judson was sending more graduates to Baptist seminaries than all the other established Baptist colleges.

Judson College became Judson University on August 28, 2007.

In 2023 the administrations of Ambria College of Nursing and Judson University announced that Ambria was being acquired by Judson University.

== Academics ==
Judson University is accredited by the Higher Learning Commission and has more than 60 undergraduate majors, minors, and pre-professional programs and is the only evangelical Christian college or university that offers an accredited graduate program in architecture. Its Master of Architecture degree is accredited by the National Architectural Accrediting Board (NAAB).

The university was granted an exception to Title IX in 2017 which allows it to legally discriminate against LGBT students for religious reasons.

Judson was ranked 95th out of 157 in the list of Midwest Regional colleges by U.S. News & World Report in 2022. It is ranked among the "Absolute Worst Campuses for LGBTQ Youth" in the US by Campus Pride.

All undergraduate students taking 12 or more credit hours are automatically enrolled in "Chapel" as a graded one-credit hour academic course. The grade is determined by attendance at religious worship held three times per week. Chapel grades are included in each students grade point average.

== Arts ==
The university offers programs and extra curricular activities in fine arts, including degrees in art and design, music, and concentrations in theater.

The Draewell Gallery, housed in the Harm A. Weber Academic Center, hosts student work as well as exhibits from artists across the country and around the world. The School of Art, Design and Architecture features a Lecture and Exhibition Series each fall and spring semester. Invited artists tend to show three-to-five times a semester along with one-to-three student shows mainly for senior exhibition.

The Judson University Theater Program offers a musical, a traditional play and a Nowhere Near Broadway production each fall and spring semester. In recent years, the theater program has produced Shakespeare performances and such plays as Steel Magnolias, Alice in Wonderland, The Wizard of Oz, Children of Eden, Newsies. Off-Stage Improv is a student-led, school-approved group that performs once a month.

The Music Department at Judson University offers degrees in professional music performance, music education, music ministry, and most recently, music business and entrepreneurship. The university has a variety of performing musical groups including symphonic and orchestral bands, choral groups and ensembles.

== Athletics ==
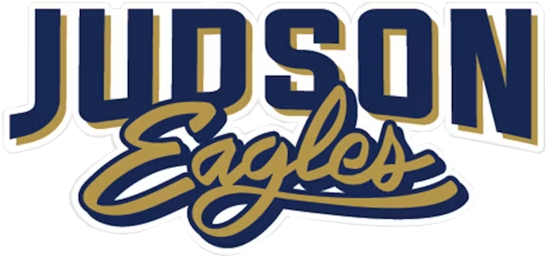
Judson athletics wordmark

The Judson athletic teams are called the Eagles. The university is a member of the National Association of Intercollegiate Athletics (NAIA), primarily competing in the NAIA Chicagoland Collegiate Athletic Conference (CCAC) since the 1996–97 academic year. They are also a member of the National Christian College Athletic Association (NCCAA), primarily competing as an independent in the North Central Region of the Division I level. The Eagles previously competed in the Northern Illinois-Iowa Conference (NIIC) of the Division III ranks of the National Collegiate Athletic Association (NCAA) from 1973–74 to 1995–96.

Judson competes 20 intercollegiate varsity sports: Men's sports include baseball, basketball, bowling, cross country, football, golf, soccer, tennis, track & field and volleyball; while women's sports include basketball, bowling, cross country, golf, soccer, softball, tennis, track & field and volleyball; and co-ed sports include cheerleading. Former sports included men's lacrosse.

=== Accomplishments ===
- Men's Soccer program has won 13 CCAC Championships.
- Women's Basketball program has won a combined six CCAC Championships.
- Men's Soccer has had much success at Judson University winning six NCCAA Championships.
- Women's Soccer program won their first-ever CCAC Championship in 2007.
- Men's baseball program has won winning six CCAC Championships.
- Softball program won their first-ever CCAC Championship in 2011.
- Volleyball program has won two CCAC Divisional Championships in the history of the program.

== University events ==
=== World Leaders Forum ===
The World Leaders Forum at Judson University brings recognized world leaders to the Judson University campus each year "to give students a chance to hear an inspiring message, take an active interest in the framework of leadership, understand how leaders develop, and even ask questions and seek advice from someone who has made a global impact on our world". All proceeds are donated to the Entrepreneurship Studies Endowment Fund and Judson Student Scholarship Fund. Past guest speakers have included former U.S. President George W. Bush, former General Secretary of the Soviet Union Mikhail Gorbachev, former U.K. Prime Minister Tony Blair, former U.S. Secretary of State Condoleezza Rice, former Mexican President Felipe Calderón., Queen Noor of Jordan., Newt Gingrich, Caroline Kennedy, and Howard Dean.

George W. Bush

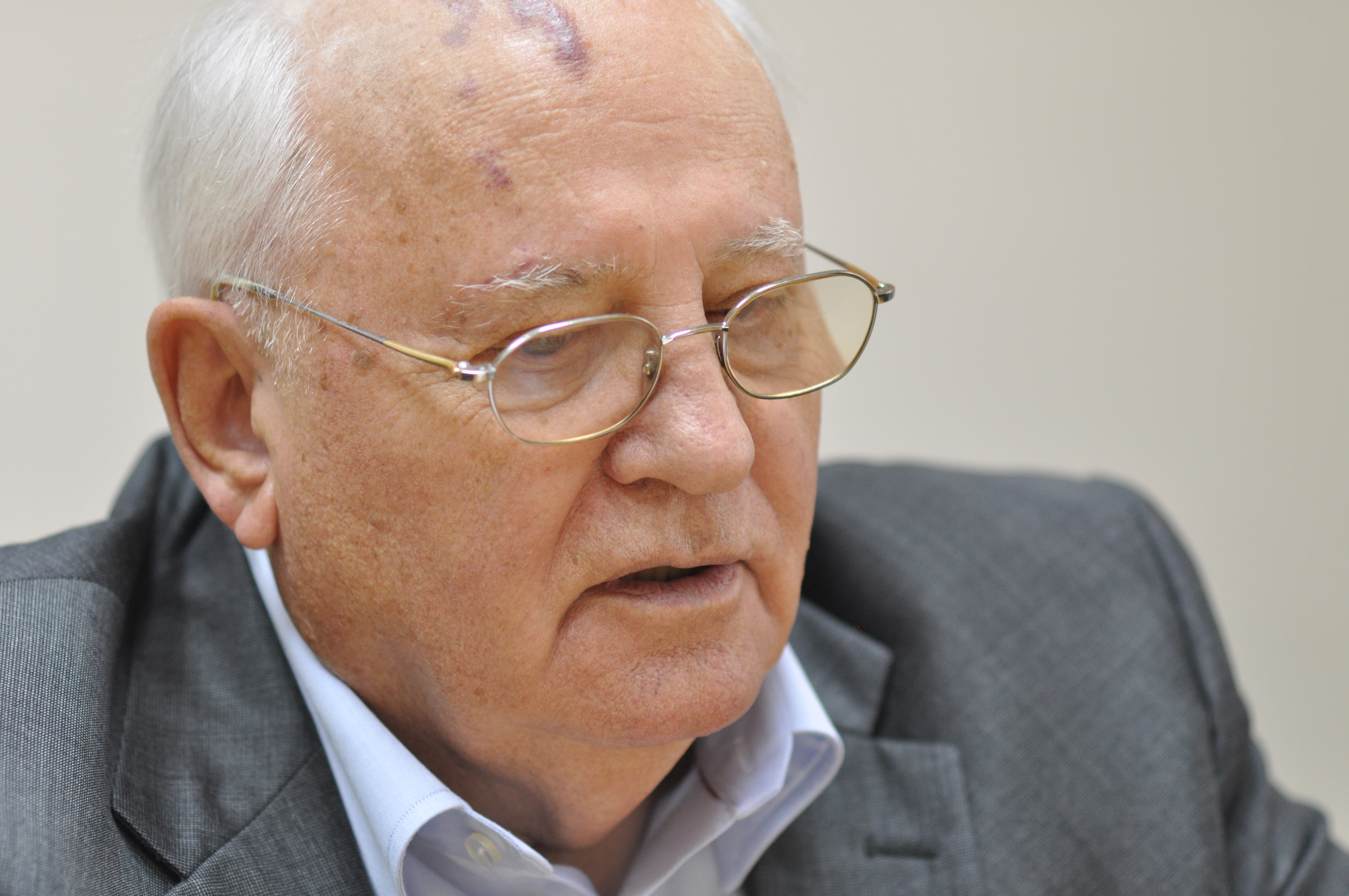
Mikhail Gorbachev

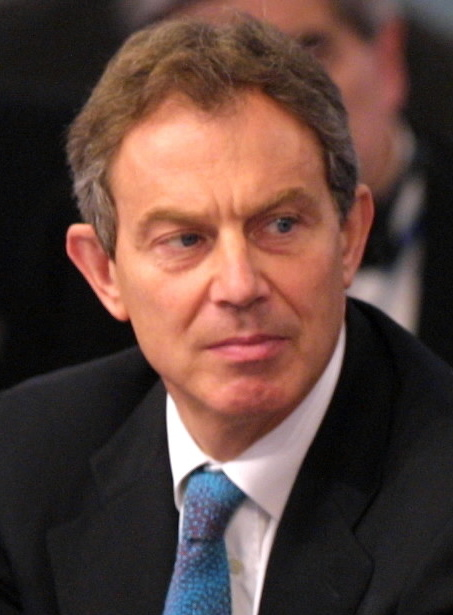
Tony Blair

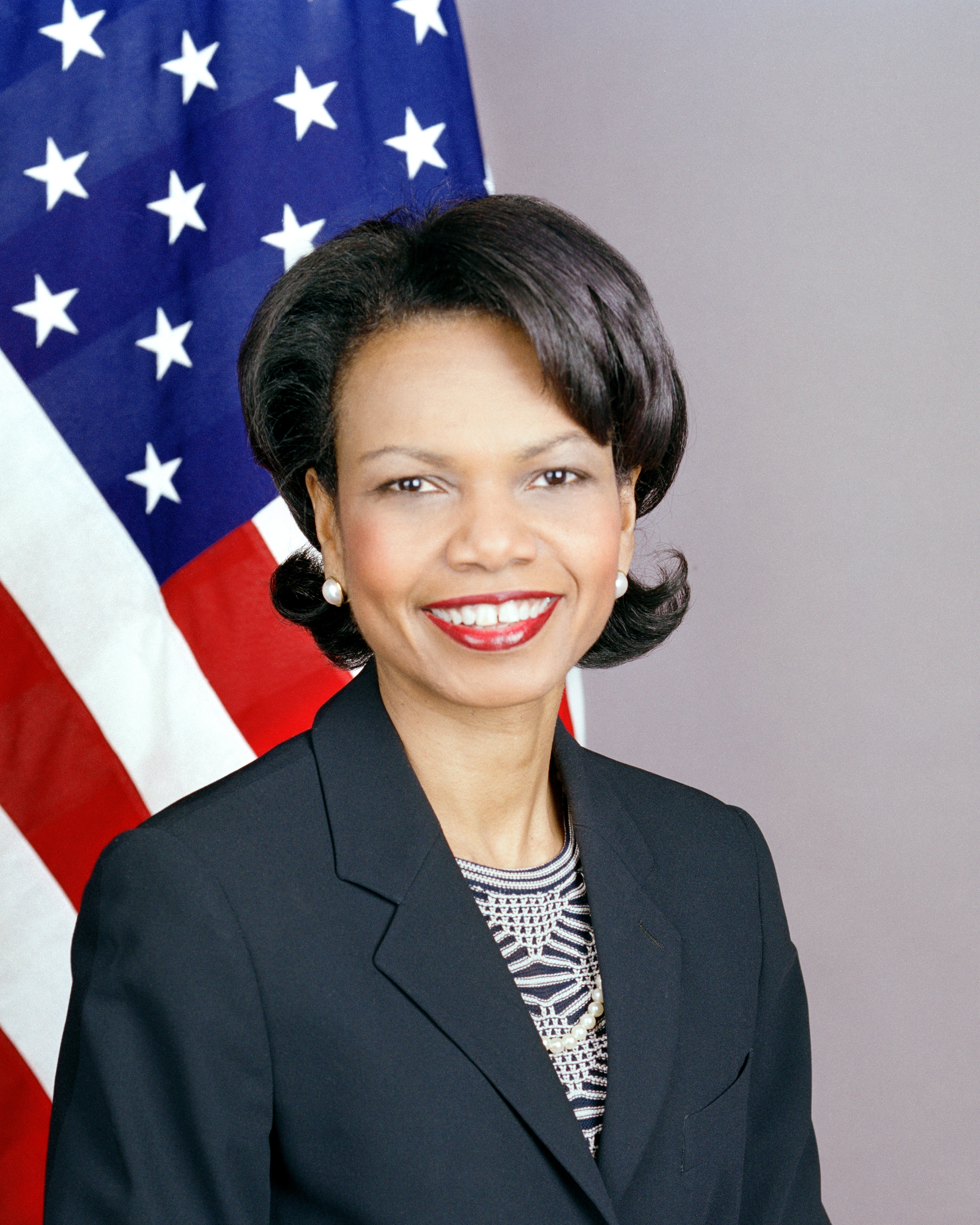
Condoleezza Rice

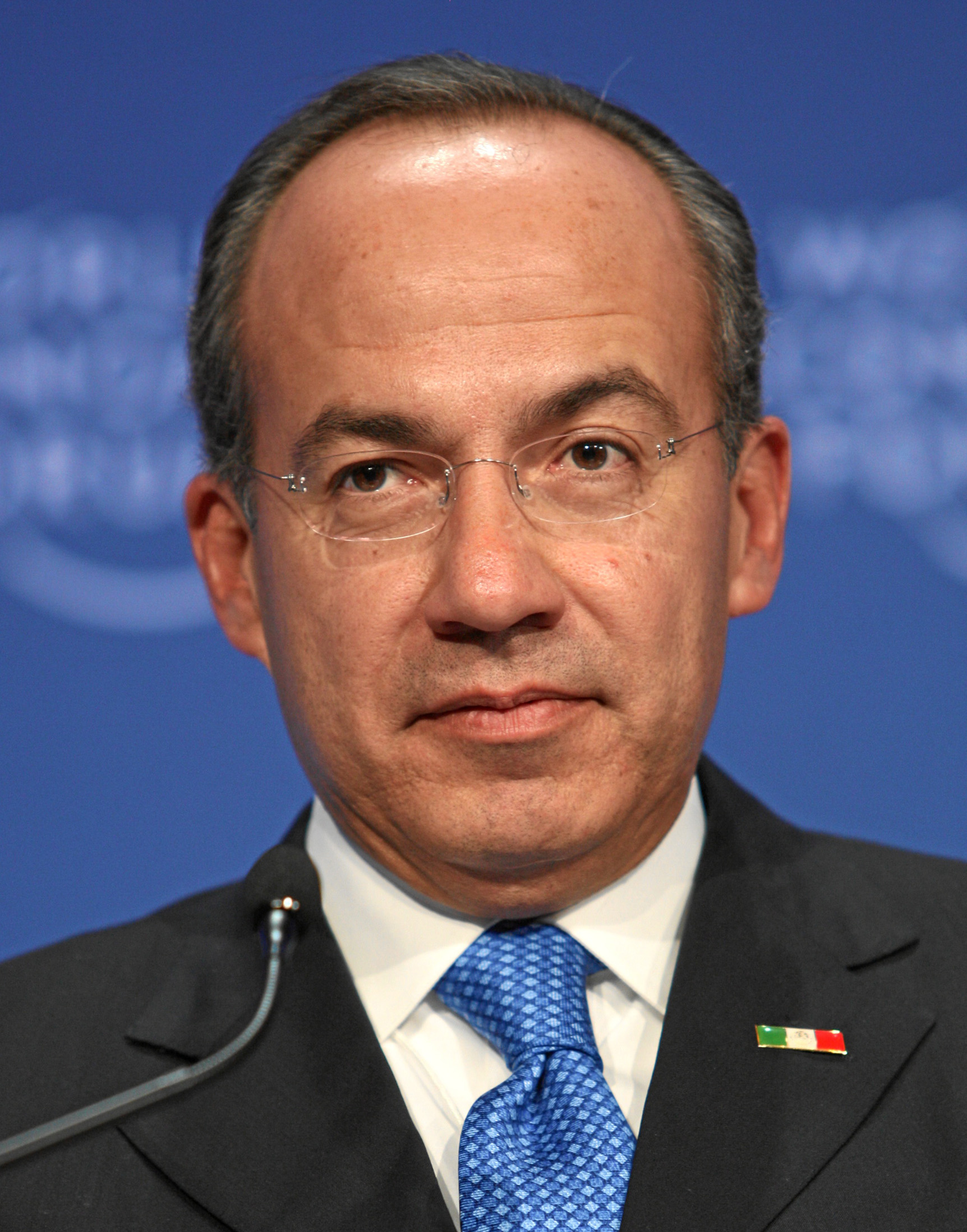
Felipe Calderón

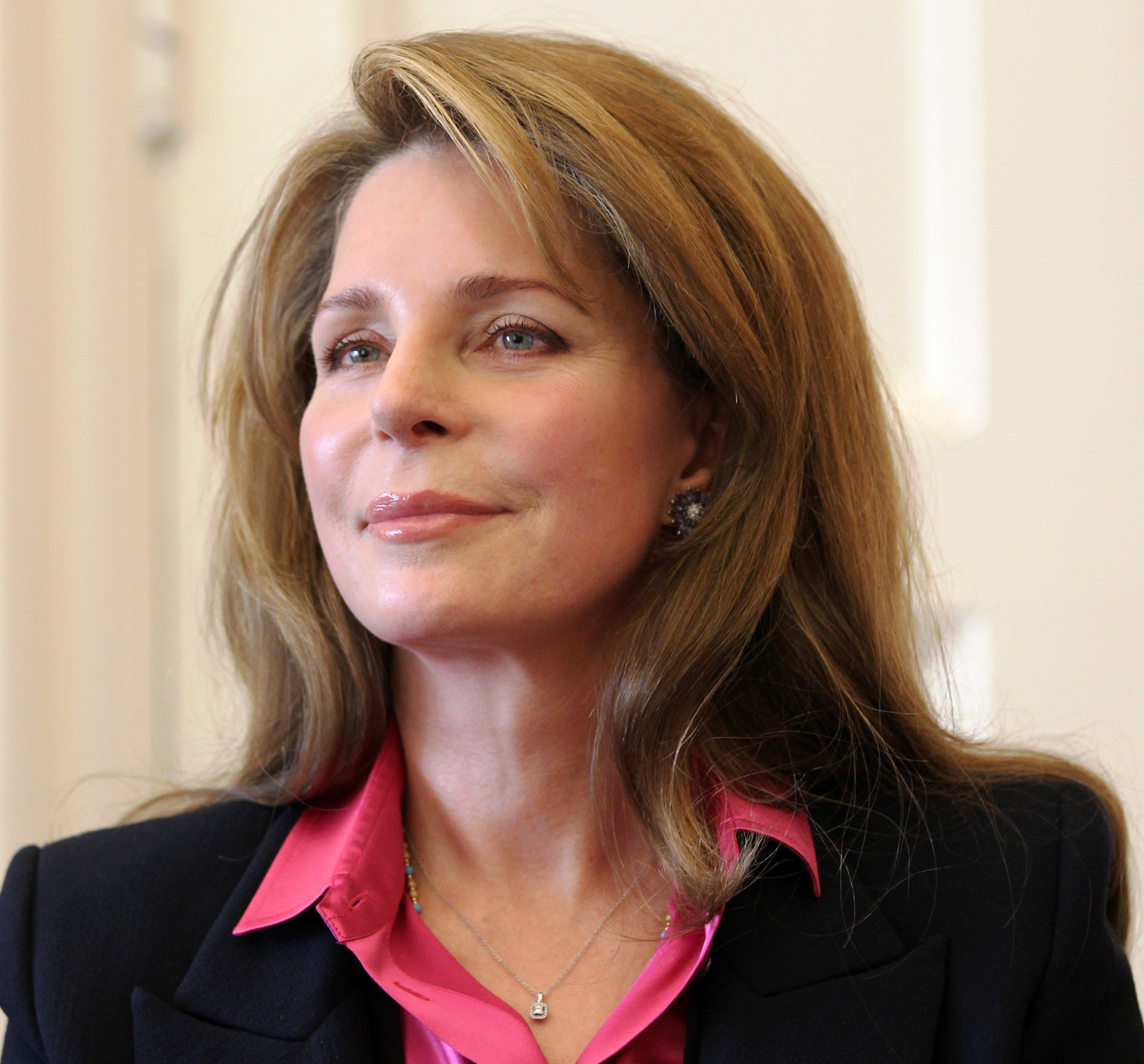
Queen Noor of Jordan

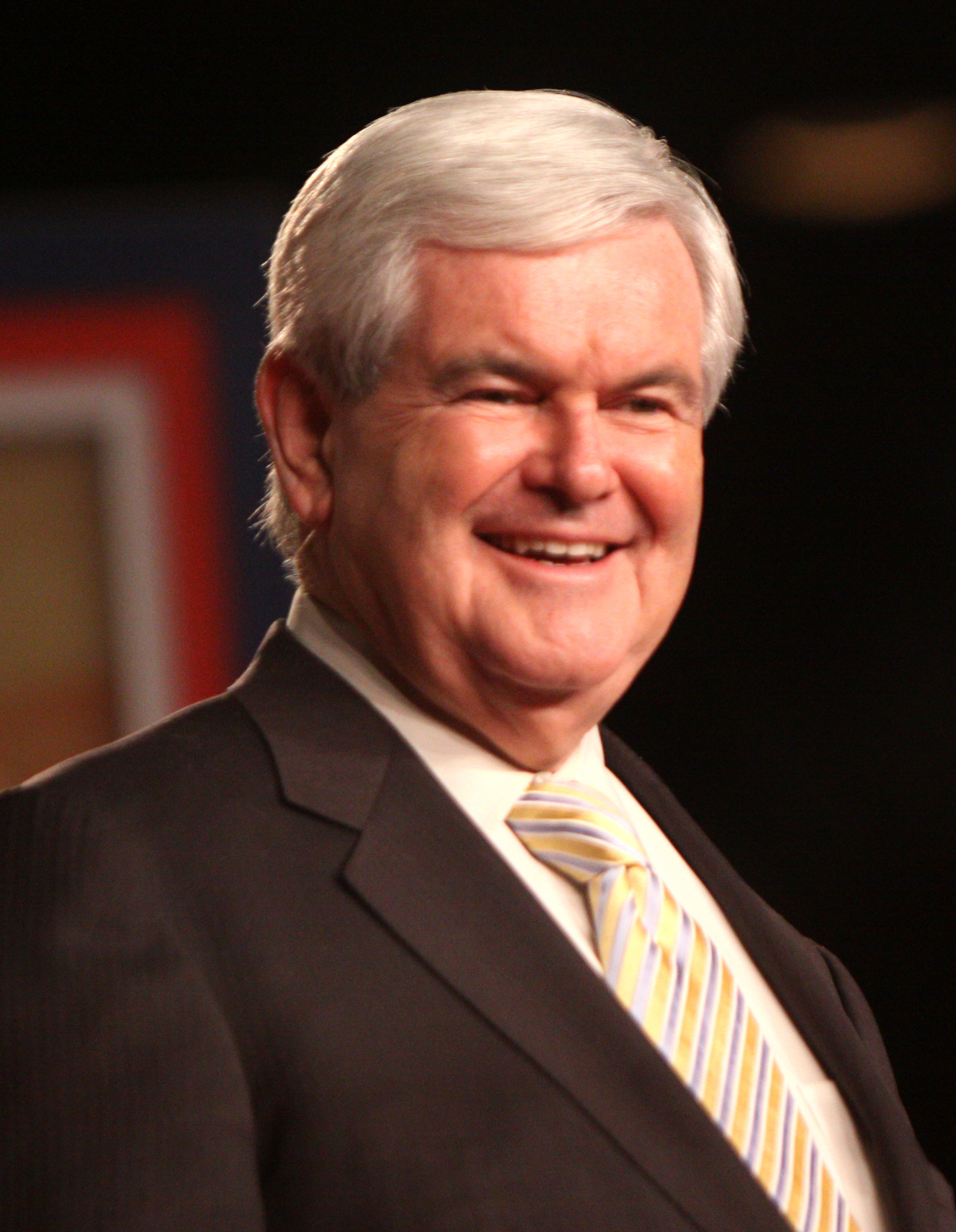
Newt Gingrich

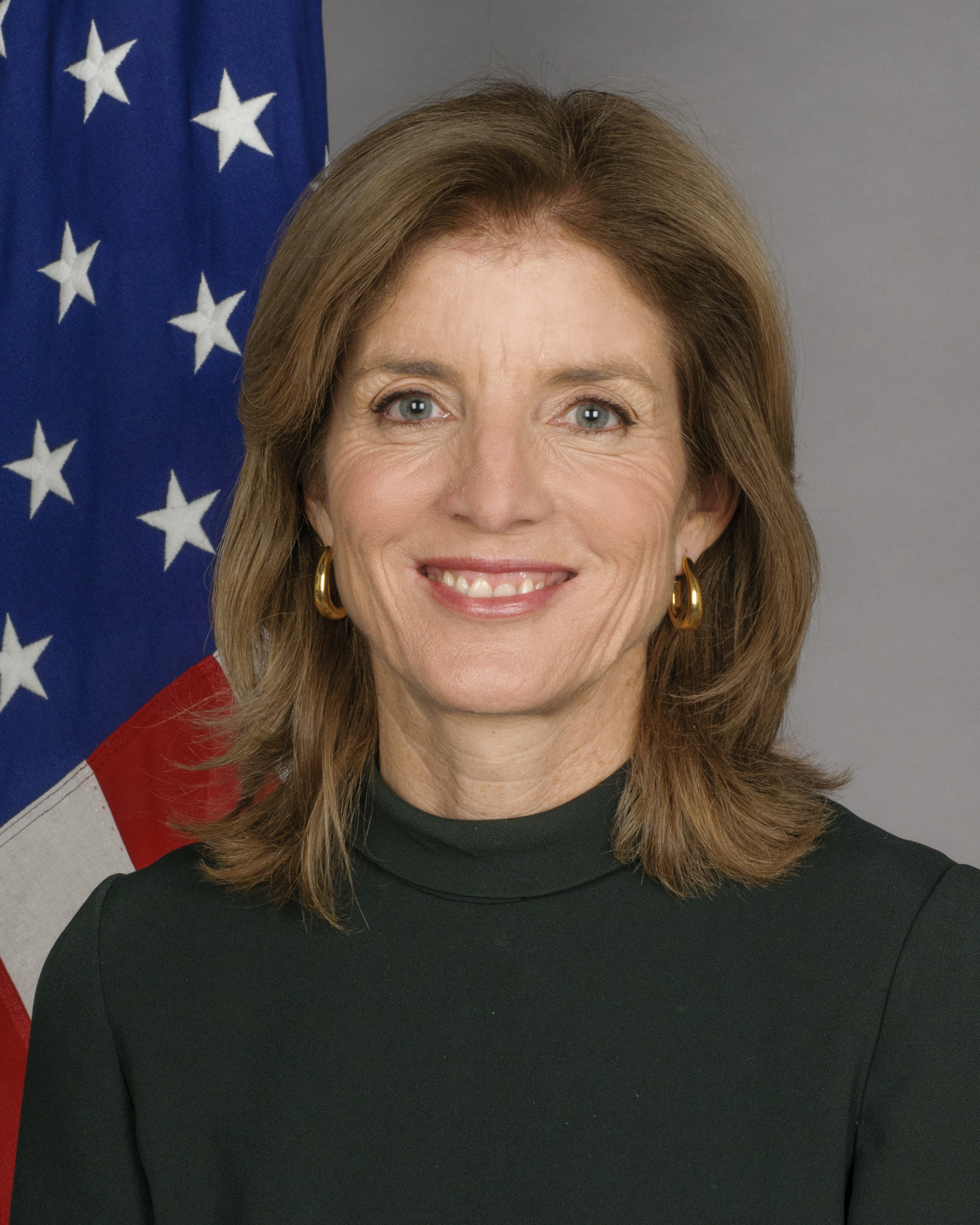
Caroline Kennedy

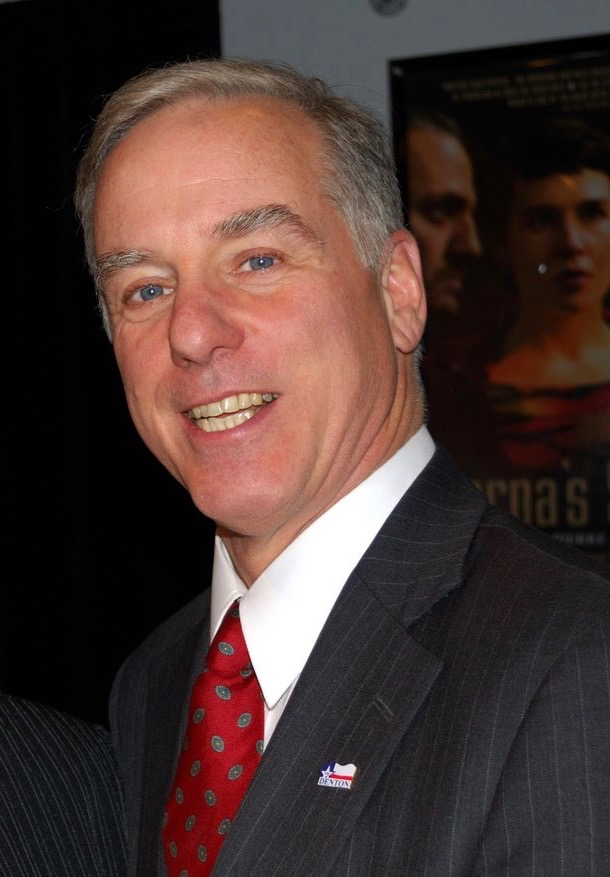
Howard Dean

=== World Leaders Forum Inspirational Series ===
The World Leaders Forum Inspirational Series is based on the World Leaders Forum. Its inaugural speaker was Nick Vujicic, who spoke on October 12, 2015 and Mary Lou Retton, who spoke on October 10, 2016.

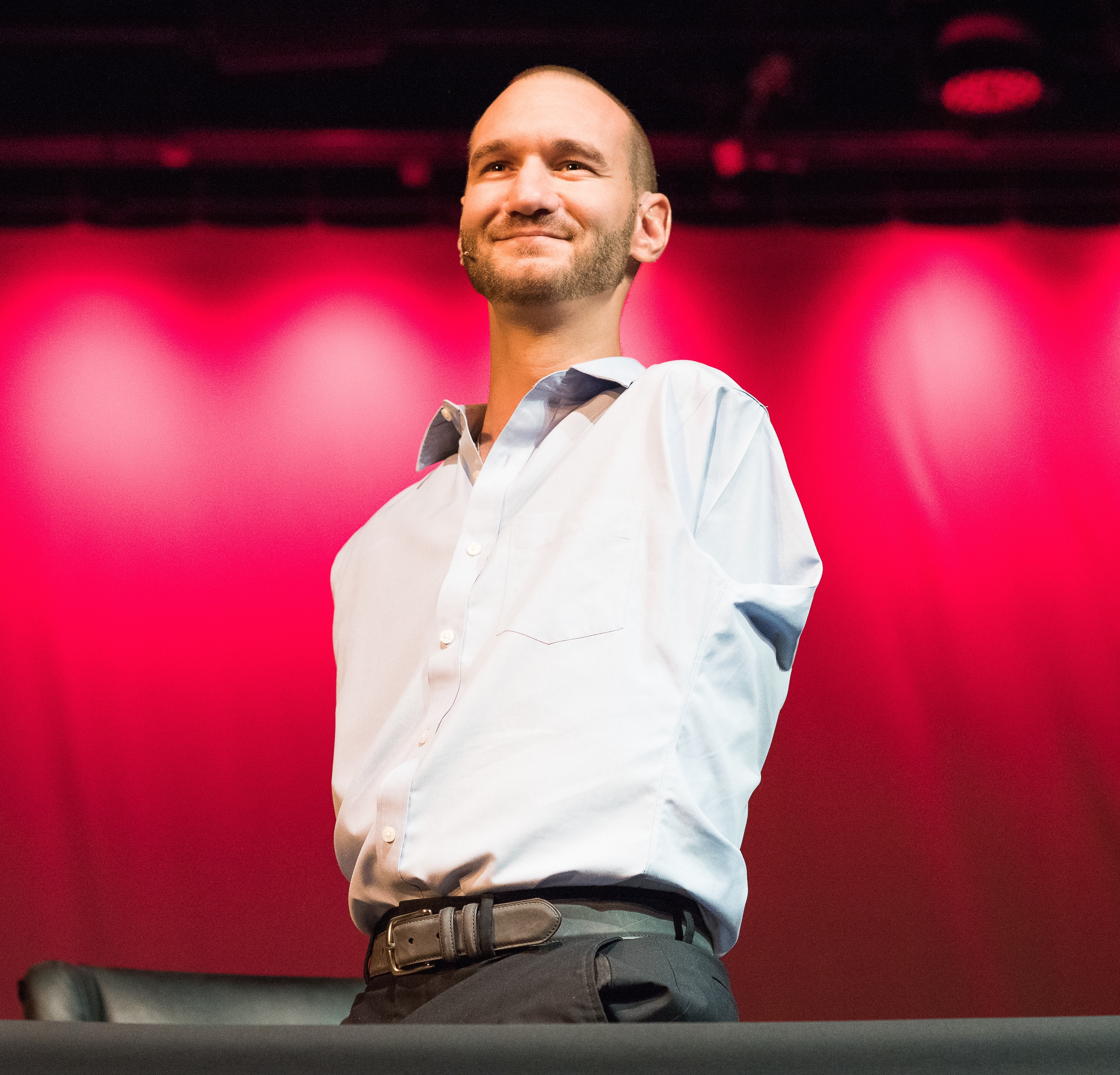
Nick Vujicic

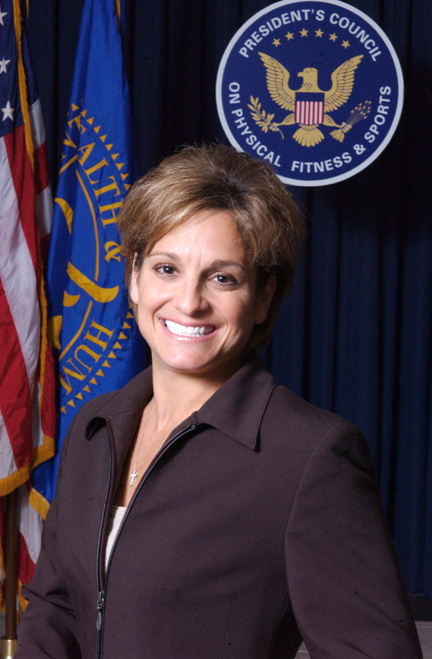
Mary Lou Retton

=== Imago Film Festival ===
The Imago Film Festival is five-day film festival held every spring at Judson University. It has been held every year since 2004. The Imago Film Festival showcases independent films dealing with faith issues, and it emphasizes images and stories about the spiritual journey of the human experience through any genre.

=== Literacy in Motion Conference ===
Judson's School of Education annually hosts its Literacy in Motion Conference in June. The conference welcomes hundreds of educators from all over the world to hear from a diverse group of speakers about new instructional methods for elevating literacy in K-12 students.

=== Judson University Founders' Day ===
Judson University was founded in 1913, and established in its current location in 1963. It celebrates Founders' Day every Fall to celebrate its founding.

== Campuses ==
=== Main Elgin Campus ===
Judson's 90-acre (36.4 ha) campus is located on the banks of the Fox River, about 45 miles (72 km) west of Chicago. The university campus was purchased in 1963, when Dr. Benjamin Browne visited the original 19-acre (7.69 ha) country estate, known as Braeburn-on-the-Fox, and offered the owner $100,000.

The Elgin campus now hosts to 17 different buildings, among them the new Harm A. Weber Academic Center, established in 2007. The 88,000-square-foot (8,200 m^{2}) Weber Center, which is home to the campus library and School of Art, Design and Architecture, is a LEED Gold certified building and one of the most energy-efficient buildings of its kind in North America.

Campus Architecture

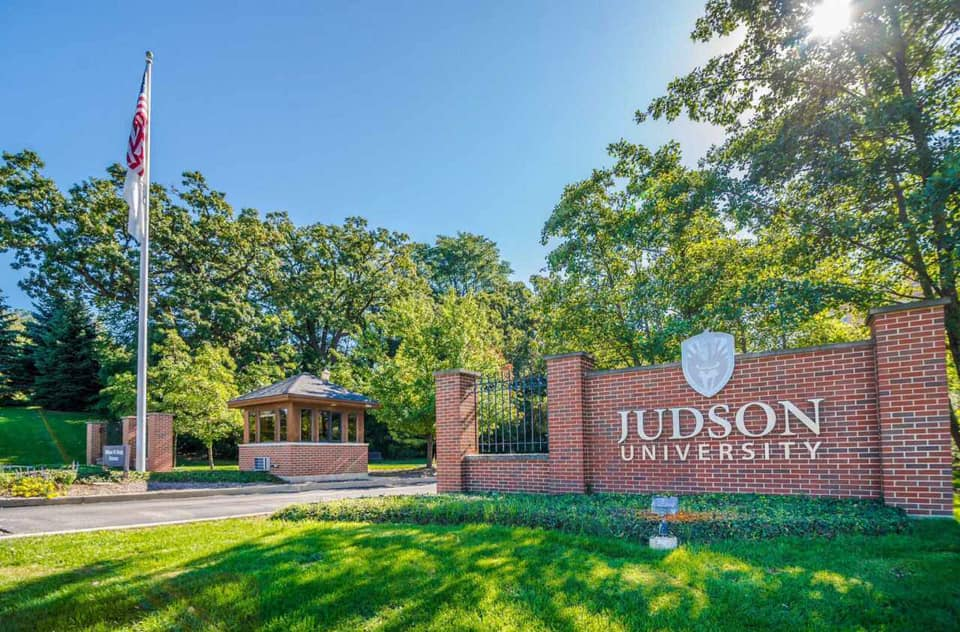
Main entrance of Judson University

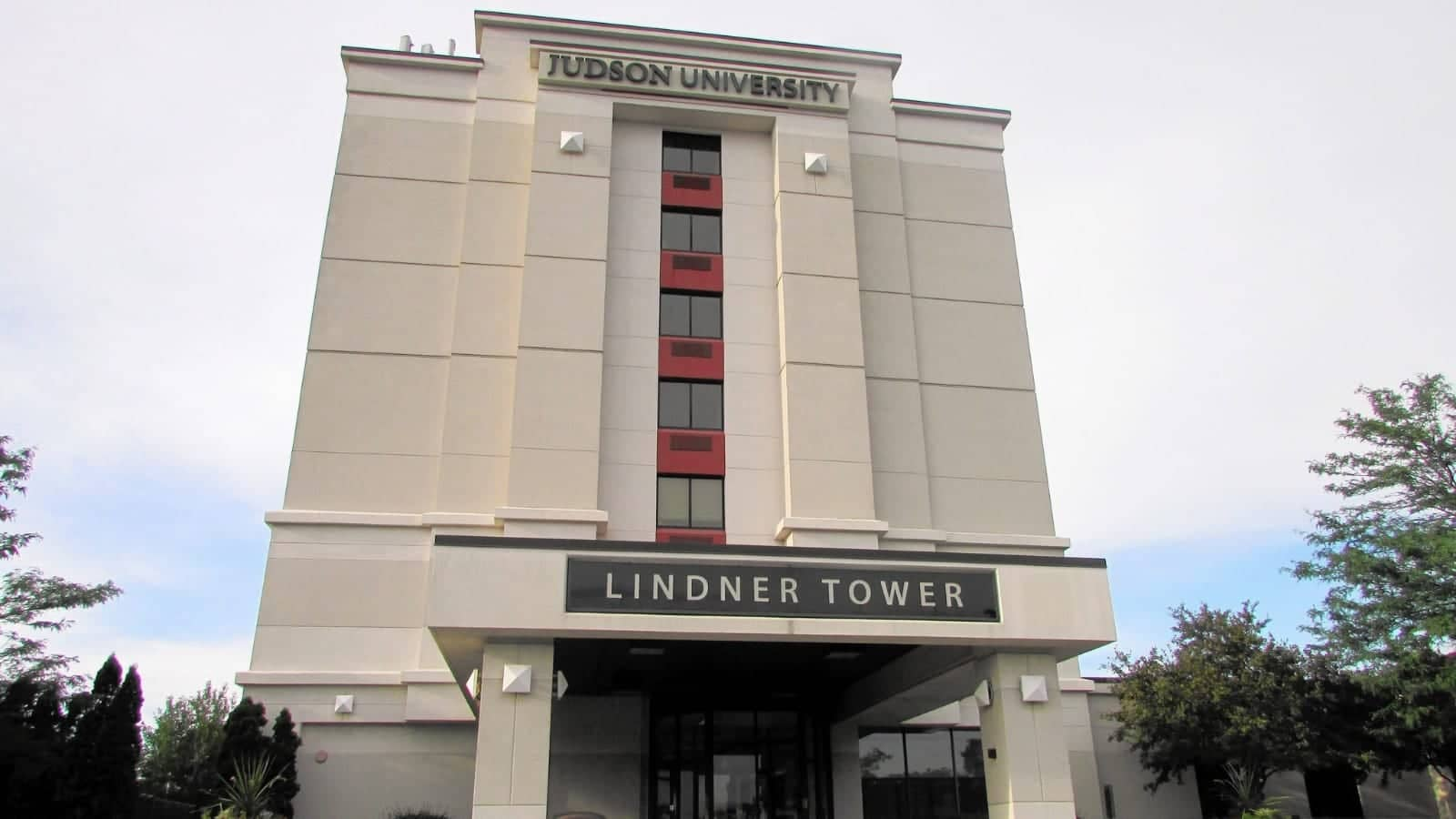
Lindner Tower and Conference Center

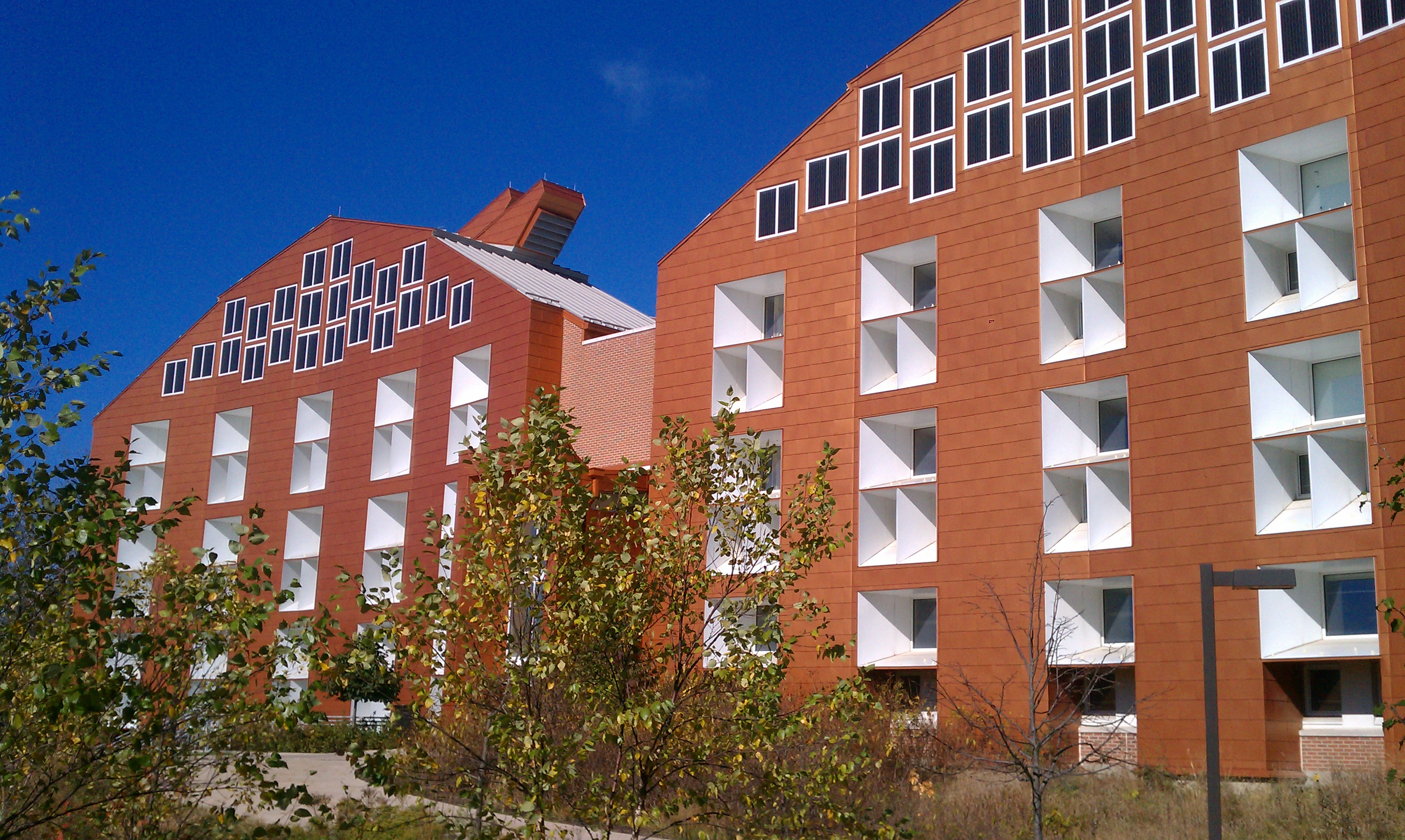
Harm A. Weber Academic Center

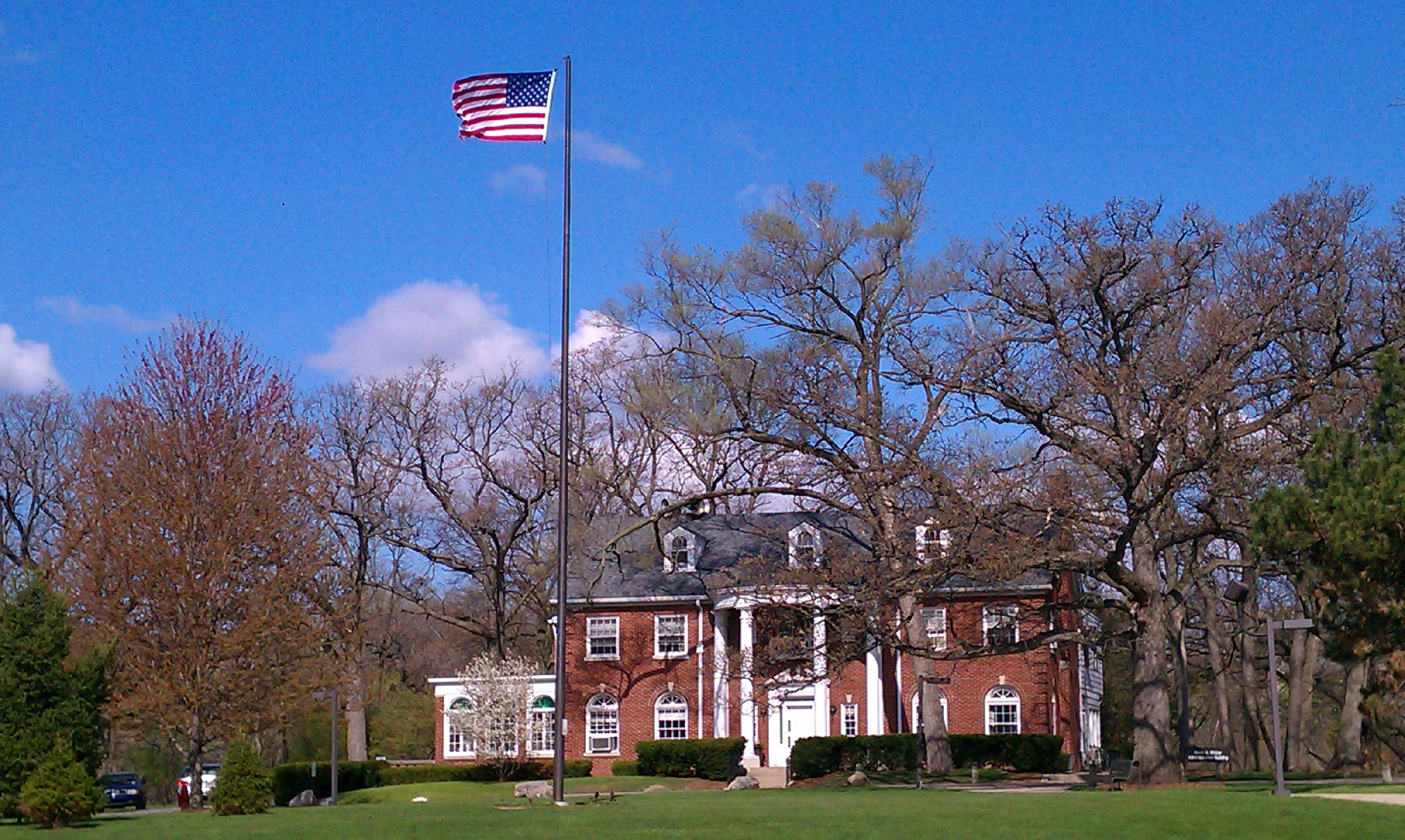
Weber Administration Building

== Notable alumni ==
- Dave Breese (1926–2002), evangelical Christian pastor, theologian, and televangelist.
- Susan Christensen, Chief Justice of the Iowa Supreme Court.
- Kelly Findley, former head men's soccer coach at North Carolina State University.
- Citizen Way, Contemporary Christian music band
