= Butler Bulldogs men's soccer =

American college soccer team

- 2022 Butler Bulldogs men's soccer team
- Founded: 1989; 37 years ago
- University: Butler University
- Head coach: Paul Snape (9th season)
- Conference: Big East
- Location: Indianapolis, Indiana, US
- Stadium: Butler Bowl (capacity: 7,500)
- Nickname: Bulldogs
- Colors: Blue and white
Home	Away

NCAA tournament Round of 16
- 1995, 1998, 2017

NCAA tournament appearances
- 1995, 1997, 1998, 2001, 2009, 2010, 2016, 2017, 2019

Conference tournament championships
- 1995, 1997, 1998, 2001, 2010, 2016

Conference regular season championships
- 1994, 1996, 1998, 2004, 2008, 2009, 2010, 2017

The Butler Bulldogs men's soccer team is an intercollegiate varsity sports team of Butler University, an NCAA Division I member school located in Indianapolis, IN. The team played its final season in the Horizon League in 2011; on July 1, 2012, the Bulldogs joined the Atlantic 10 Conference for one season. The team currently plays in the Big East Conference.

== History ==
Butler University first fielded a varsity men's soccer team in 1989, when they earned a 12–7 record under head coach Langdon Kumler, including a 7–0 record against teams from the state of Indiana. The Bulldogs began conference play the following season when their record improved to 14–6 with a 5–3 mark in the Midwestern Collegiate Conference (now called the Horizon League). Coach Kumler left the program following the 1992 season and the Bulldogs were next coached by Ian Martin, who led the team to its first NCAA tournament in 1995, when the Bulldogs made it to the round of 16 after beating in-state rival and perennial national finalist, the Indiana Hoosiers.

Martin also coached the team to its second appearance in the round of 16 in 1998 before leaving the program following the 1999 season. Todd Bramble served as the head coach for one season and is now the head coach for the women's soccer team at the University of Alabama. The Bulldogs next appeared in the NCAA tournament in 2001 under head coach Joe Sochacki, who left after the 2005 season.

Kelly Findley served as the Bulldogs' head coach from 2006 until 2010 and was arguably the team's best coach, leading them to consecutive appearances in the NCAA tournament in 2009 and 2010, including an unbeaten regular season record. Findley left following the 2010 season to take the helm at North Carolina State.

Butler left the Horizon League following the 2011 season when the athletic department moved to the Atlantic 10 Conference. During their time in the Horizon, the Bulldogs earned five conference tournament championships, in 1995, 1997, 1998, 2001, and 2010; and five conference season championships, in 1996, 1998, 2004, 2009, and 2010.

Butler wins the 2016 BIG EAST Championship!

== Players ==
As of Jul 2026

Note: Flags indicate national team as defined under FIFA eligibility rules; some limited exceptions apply. Players may hold more than one non-FIFA nationality.

No.	Pos.	Nation	Player
1	GK	USA	Brooks Boersma
2	DF	ENG	Oscar Dawber
3	DF	USA	Evan Muckridge
4	DF	ESP	Manolo Ferreres
5	DF	WAL	Kiel Higginson
6	MF	JPN	Haato Efune
7	MF	USA	Luca Raso
8	MF	ESP	Nacho de Miguel
9	FW	USA	Brendan Cunningham
10	FW	ENG	Adam Watson
12	FW	USA	Hayden Neale
13	MF	USA	Jaden Hancock
14	MF	USA	Charlie Hosier

No.	Pos.	Nation	Player
15	MF	USA	Kai Pope
16	MF	USA	Alec Sexton
17	DF	FRA	Lou-Kent Bosc
18	MF	GER	Max Klein
19	DF	USA	Trent Lindsey
20	FW	USA	Finn Moran
22	DF	USA	Anden Ellis
23	MF	USA	Braden Benyr
24	FW	USA	Chace Crismale
25	DF	USA	Hudson Sullivan
26	DF	USA	Nikolas Juarez
30	GK	USA	Jameson Metz
32	GK	USA	Inigo Esmanech

=== Awards and recognition ===
NSCAA Regional (Great Lakes) All-Americans

Year	Player	Squad
1990	Scott Lawler	(1st team)
1992	Scott Lawler	(1st team)
1993	Steve Weigner	(3rd team)
1994	Steve Weigner	(2nd team)
	Casey Sweeney	(3rd team)
1995	Steve Weigner	(1st team)
1996	Stephen Armstrong	(1st team)
	Craig Donaldson	(3rd team)
1997	Jeremy Aldrich	(1st team)
	Stephen Armstrong	(1st team)
1998	Jeremy Aldrich	(1st team)
	Stephen Armstrong	(1st team)
	Giancarlo Barraza	(3rd team)
	Craig Donaldson	(2nd team)
2001	Nick Pantazi	(2nd team)
2002	Nick Pantazi	(2nd team)
	Michael Mariscalco	(2nd team)
	Grant Barrie	(3rd team)
2004	John Mariscalco	(2nd team)
	Scott Olsen	(2nd team)
2006	John DeVae	(3rd team)
2007	Frank Patano	(3rd team)
2008	Eduardo Garcia	(2nd team)
	Frank Patano	(3rd team)
2009	Matt Hedges	(2nd team)
	Kyle VondenBenken	(2nd team)
	Boris Gatzkey	(3rd team)
2010	Ben Sippola	(1st team)
	Matt Hedges	(1st team)
	Conner Burt	(2nd team)
2016	David Goldsmith	(2nd team)
2017	Eric Dick	(1st team)

NSCAA/CoSIDA National All-Americans

Year	Player	Squad
1995	Steve Weiger	(2nd team)
1998	Jeremy Aldrich	(2nd team)
2002	Michael Mariscalco	(Academic 1st team)
2005	Patrick Reilly	(Academic 2nd team)
2006	Paul Mongillo	(Academic 2nd team)
2009	Conner Burt	(Academic 1st team)
2010	Ben Sippola	(1st team)
2010	Conner Burt	(Academic 1st team)
2013	Brandon Fricke	(Academic 1st team)

Notable Conference Awards

Player	Achievement
Steve Weiger	Horizon League Player of the Year: 1995
Jeremy Aldrich	Horizon League Player of the Year: 1998
Julian Cardona	Horizon League Newcomer of the Year: 2009
Ben Sippola	Horizon League Player of the Year: 2010
Ben Sippola	Horizon League Offensive Player of the Year: 2010
Matt Hedges	Horizon League Defensive Player of the Year: 2009, 2010
David Goldsmith	Big East Rookie of the Year: 2013
Eric Dick	Big East Goalkeeper of the Year: 2017
Wilmer Cabrera Jr.	Big East Freshman of the Year: 2019
Wilmer Cabrera Jr.	Big East Co-Offensive Player of the Year: 2019
Palmer Ault	Big East Freshman of the Year: 2022

First Team All-Conference

Year	Player
1990	Scott Lawler
1991	Scott Lawler
1991	Jeff Moehlenkamp
1992	Scott Lawler
1993	Scott Weiger
1994	Steve Weiger
1995	Casey Sweeney
1995	Steve Weiger
1996	Jeremy Aldrich
1997	Jeremy Aldrich
1997	Stephen Armstrong
1997	Craig Donaldson
1997	Alan Placek

Year	Player
1998	Jeremy Aldrich
1998	Stephen Armstrong
1998	Giancarlo Barraza
1998	Craig Donaldson
1999	Stephen Armstrong
1999	David Beck
1999	Bryan Foxworthy
2001	Michael Mariscalco
2001	Nick Pantazi
2002	Michael Mariscalco
2002	Nick Pantazi
2003	Scott Olsen

Year	Player
2004	Scott Olsen
2004	Cory Edginton
2004	John Mariscalco
2006	John DeVae
2008	Eduardo Garcia
2008	Frank Patano
2009	Boris Gatzky
2009	Matt Hedges
2009	Kyle VondenBenken
2010	Ben Sippola
2010	Matt Hedges
2011	Austin Oldham

Year	Player
2013	Zach Steinberger
2015	Vincent Mitchell
2016	David Goldsmith
2016	Jared Timmer
2017	Brandon Guhl
2017	Lewis Suddick
2017	Eric Dick
2020	Rhys Myers
2020	Wilmer Cabrera Jr.
2021	Wilmer Cabrera Jr.
2022	Palmer Ault
2022	Wilmer Cabrera Jr.

== Coaches ==
=== Awards ===
Conference Coach of the Year

Year	Coach	Conference
1998	Ian Martin	MCC
2009	Kelly Findley	Horizon
2010	Kelly Findley	Horizon
2017	Paul Snape	Big East

== Honours ==
=== Conference titles ===
- Horizon League
  - Regular season (7): 1994, 1996, 1998, 2004, 2008, 2009, 2010
  - Tournament (5): 1995, 1997, 1998, 2001, 2010
- Big East Conference
  - Regular season (2): 2016, 2017
- Big East Conference
  - Tournament (1): 2016

=== NCAA appearances ===
- NCAA Tournament (9): 1995, 1997, 1998, 2001, 2009, 2010, 2016, 2017, 2019
- NCAA Tournament round of 16 (3): 1995, 1998, 2017

== Records ==
Season	Coach	Overall	Conference	Standing	Postseason
Langdon Kumler (Independent) (1989–1989)
1989	Langdon Kumler	12–7–0			
Langdon Kumler (Horizon League) (1990–1992)
1990	Langdon Kumler	14–6–0	5–3–0	4th	
1991	Langdon Kumler	8–9–1	2–4–0	T-4th	
1992	Langdon Kumler	10–6–3	2–4–1	T-5th	
Langdon Kumler:		44–28–4	9–11–1		
Ian Martin (Horizon League) (1993–1999)
1993	Ian Martin	9–9–2	3–3–0	4th	
1994	Ian Martin	8–12–1	5–3–0	T-1st	
1995	Ian Martin	18–5–1	6–1–1	2nd	NCAA Regional Semi-final
1996	Ian Martin	11–7–2	7–1–0	1st	
1997	Ian Martin	12–10–1	4–2–1	3rd	NCAA 1st Round
1998	Ian Martin	19–5–1	7–0–0	1st	NCAA Regional Semi-final
1999	Ian Martin	7–12–0	5–2–0	3rd	
Ian Martin:		84–60–8	37–12–2		
Todd Bramble (Horizon League) (2000–2000)
2000	Todd Bramble	6–13–0	3–4–0	5th	
Todd Bramble:		6–13–0	3–4–0		
Joe Sochacki (Horizon League) (2001–2005)
2001	Joe Sochacki	11–9–0	5–2–0	2nd	NCAA 1st Round
2002	Joe Sochacki	9–10–3	4–3–0	T-4th	
2003	Joe Sochacki	12–7–3	5–1–1	2nd	
2004	Joe Sochacki	13–6–1	5–1–1	T-1st	
2005	Joe Sochacki	9–10–0	2–5–0	7th	
Joe Sochacki:		54–42–7	21–12–2		
Kelly Findley (Horizon League) (2006–2010)
2006	Kelly Findley	7–11–2	2–4–1	6th	
2007	Kelly Findley	9–7–4	4–2–2	T-4th	
2008	Kelly Findley	13–3–4	5–0–3	T-1st	
2009	Kelly Findley	14–3–2	6–1–1	1st	NCAA 2nd Round
2010	Kelly Findley	16–1–3	7–0–1	1st	NCAA 2nd Round
Kelly Findley:		59–25–15	24–7–8		
Paul Snape (Horizon League) (2011)
2011	Paul Snape	7–8–3	2–4–2	T-7th	
Paul Snape (Atlantic 10 Conference) (2012)
2012	Paul Snape	5–8–5	3–5–1	T-9th	
Paul Snape (Big East Conference) (2013–present)
2013	Paul Snape	11–8–1	4–5–0	6th	
2014	Paul Snape	6–7–5	2–5–2	8th	
2015	Paul Snape	10–4–4	6–3–0	3rd	
2016	Paul Snape	13–5–2	6–3–0	2nd	NCAA 2nd Round
2017	Paul Snape	14–5–2	8–1–0	1st	NCAA Regional Semi-Final
2018	Paul Snape	4–12–2	2–7–0	10th	
2019	Paul Snape	11–7–2	4–4–1	T-4th	NCAA 1st Round
2020	Paul Snape	4–6–2	4–2–2	3rd, Midwest	
2021	Paul Snape	7–9–3	5–4–1	6th	
2022	Paul Snape	10–6–3	4–3–3	T-3rd	
2023	Paul Snape	2–7–6	1–3–4	9th	
2024	Paul Snape	4–10–3	1–7–0	11th	
Paul Snape:		108–102–43	2–4–2 (Horizon); 3–5–1 (Atlantic 10); 47–47–13 (Big East)		
Total:		355–270–78			
National champion Postseason invitational champion Conference regular season champion Conference regular season and conference tournament champion Division regular season champion Division regular season and conference tournament champion Conference tournament champion
