= Jeremy Aldrich =

American soccer player (born 1977)

Personal information
- Date of birth: February 26, 1977 (age 49)
- Place of birth: Kalamazoo, Michigan, United States
- Height: 6 ft 2 in (1.88 m)
- Position: Defender

College career
Years	Team	Apps	(Gls)
1995–1998	Butler Bulldogs		

Senior career*
Years	Team	Apps	(Gls)
1996	Kalamazoo Kingdom		(3)
1998	Michigan Bucks		(7)
1999–2000	Miami Fusion	22	(0)
2000	→ MLS Pro 40 (loan)	3	(0)
2001	Indiana Blast	21	(1)
2001	→ Chicago Fire (loan)	0	(0)
2001	→ Columbus Crew (loan)	0	(0)
2002	Milwaukee Rampage	26	(3)
2003	Milwaukee Wave United	24	(1)
2003	Milwaukee Wave (indoor)	1	(0)
2003–2005	Philadelphia KiXX (indoor)	65	(8)
2004	Virginia Beach Mariners	20	(1)
2005	Colorado Rapids	0	(0)

International career
1996–1997	United States U-20		

Managerial career
- 2001: Butler Bulldogs (assistant)
- 2006–2009: Metro State Roadrunners (assistant)
- * Club domestic league appearances and goals

Jeremy Aldrich (born February 26, 1977) is an American retired soccer defender who spent two seasons in Major League Soccer.

== Player ==
=== Youth ===
Aldrich attended the Butler University where he played on the men's soccer team from 1995 to 1998. He was a 1998 Second Team All American. Butler inducted him into the school's Athletic Hall of Fame in 2011. Aldrich played for the Kalamazoo Kingdom during the 1996 collegiate offseason and the Michigan Bucks during the 1998 offseason.

=== Professional ===
On February 6, 1999, the Miami Fusion drafted Aldrich in the second round (nineteenth overall) of the 1999 MLS College Draft. He played eighteen games as a rookie, but saw his playing time diminish in 2000 due to several injuries, particularly in the knee and back area. That season, the Fusion sent Aldrich on loan to MLS Pro-40 in the USL A-League for three games. The Fusion released him in February 2001. In March 2001, the Indiana Blast of the USL A-League signed Aldrich. He went on loan to the Chicago Fire and Columbus Crew during the season, but never entered a game with either team. In 2002, he moved to the Milwaukee Rampage and Milwaukee Wave United for the 2003 season. He also played the last game of the indoor season for the Milwaukee Wave of the Major Indoor Soccer League. He moved to the Philadelphia KiXX in the fall of 2003. He spent two seasons with the KiXX. In 2004, he also played for the Virginia Beach Mariners. In 2005, Aldrich signed with the Colorado Rapids. He played one game for the Rapids’ reserve team, but never entered a first team game.

=== International ===
In 1996 and 1997, Aldrich played for the United States men's national under-20 soccer team.

== Coach ==
In 2001, Aldrich spent one season as an assistant coach with the Butler Bulldogs. In August 2008, he became an assistant coach with the Metro State College men's soccer team.
