= Unión Molinense CF =

Association football club in Spain

Unión Molinense
- Full name: Unión Molinense Club de Fútbol
- Founded: 2017; 2021 (merger)
- Ground: Sánchez Cánovas, Molina de Segura, Region of Murcia, Spain
- Capacity: 5,000
- President: Juan Fabrilo Perea
- Manager: Sergio Sánchez
- League: Tercera Federación – Group 13
- 2024–25: Tercera Federación – Group 13, 3rd of 18
Home colours	Away colours

Unión Molinense Club de Fútbol is a football team based in Molina de Segura, Region of Murcia. Founded in 2017 under the name of CF Molina, the team plays in Tercera Federación – Group 13, holding home games at Estadio Municipal Sánchez Cánovas.

== History ==
=== Background ===
Football in the city of Molina de Segura began in the 1920s with Sport Club Molinense, with Los Luíses Football Club and Club Deportivo Molinense Balompié also being active in the period. In the 1930s and after the Spanish Civil War, several clubs were created in the city, but none of them were able to establish themselves until the creation of CD Molinense in 1952. Molinense went on to play a small number of seasons in the 1950s before being refounded in 1971, playing for several seasons in Tercera División before officially ceasing activities in 2009.

Founded in 2017 as Club de Fútbol Molina Promesas, a reserve team of CF Molina, the club were renamed to Club de Fútbol Molina Olimpic after Molina became Independiente de Ceutí FC. In 2019, after their promotion to the Preferente Autonómica, the club were renamed to Club de Fútbol Molina. Two seasons later, the club were renamed to Club de Fútbol Molina San Miguel, after establishing a partnership with Escuela de Fútbol San Miguel; the latter club became their reserve team.

=== Establishment of Unión Molinense ===
On 30 July 2021, it was made official that CF Molina and EF San Miguel merged, creating Unión Molinense Club de Fútbol; the club still officially competed as CF Molina San Miguel in that season. On 10 June 2022, after missing out promotion to Tercera Federación, the club acquired Archena Sport FC's place in the fifth tier; their place in the Preferente Autonómica went to their new reserve team.

Unión Molinense is considered as an "heir" of CD Molinense, to honour the biggest club of the city.

=== Club names and overview ===
- Club de Fútbol Molina Promesas (2017–2018); reserve team of CF Molina
- Club de Fútbol Molina Olimpic (2018–2019); independent club
- Club de Fútbol Molina (2019–2021)
- Club de Fútbol Molina San Miguel (2021–2022); partnership with EF San Miguel and subsequent merger
- Unión Molinense Club de Fútbol (2022–)

== Season to season ==
Season	Tier	Division	Place	Copa del Rey
2017–18	6	1ª Aut.	10th	N/A (Note: Reserve team of Molina.)
2018–19	6	1ª Aut.	1st	
2019–20	5	Pref. Aut.	14th	
2020–21	5	Pref. Aut.	5th	
2021–22	6	Pref. Aut.	5th	
2022–23	5	3ª Fed.	6th	
2023–24	5	3ª Fed.	7th	
2024–25	5	3ª Fed.	3rd	
2025–26	5	3ª Fed.		

- 4 seasons in Tercera Federación
