= Casey Sweeney =

American soccer player

Personal information
- Date of birth: January 8, 1974 (age 52)
- Place of birth: United States
- Position: Defender

Youth career
- 1992–1995: Butler Bulldogs

Senior career*
| Years | Team | Apps | (Gls) |
| 1996 | Hampton Roads Mariners | | |
| 1996–1998 | Milwaukee Rampage | | |
| 1999–2001 | Indiana Blast | 44 | (2) |
- * Club domestic league appearances and goals

Casey Sweeney is a retired American soccer player who played professionally in the USISL.

== Youth ==
Sweeney attended Butler University where he played on the men's soccer team from 1992 to 1995.

== Professional ==
In January 1995, the Harrisburg Heat of the National Professional Soccer League selected Sweeney in the first round of the NPSL Amateur Draft. Sweeney never signed with the Heat and in November 1996, the Heat traded his rights to the Detroit Rockers for the 1996 first round draft pick. Sweeney also refused to sign with the Rockers. In March, 1996, the Tampa Bay Mutiny selected Sweeney in the second round (fourteenth overall) of the 1996 MLS College Draft. The Mutiny cut him during the pre-season. In April 1996, he joined the Hampton Roads Mariners and saw limited time in at least one game. However, he never agreed to contract terms with the team and in May he signed with the Milwaukee Rampage. Sweeney remained with the Rampage through 1998, winning the 1997 USISL A-League title with them. In February 1999, the Rampage traded Sweeney to the Indiana Blast in exchange for a first round selection in the 1999 USISL draft. On February 7, 2000, the Kansas City Wizards, coached by ex-Rampage head coach Bob Gansler, selected Sweeney in the sixth round (62nd overall) of the 2000 MLS SuperDraft but waived him three weeks later. He returned to the Blast and played for them through 2001.
