= Kelly Findley =

American soccer coach

Biographical details
- Born: September 8, 1970 (age 56)

Playing career
- 1988–1991: Judson
- 1992–1996: Charlotte Eagles

Coaching career (HC unless noted)
- 1992: Judson (assistant)
- 1997–1998: Charlotte Eagles (assistant)
- 1998: Miami (OH) (assistant)
- 1999–2000: Mars Hill
- 2001–2005: Charlotte (assistant)
- 2006–2010: Butler
- 2011–2016: NC State
- 2018: Davidson (assistant)
- 2019–2025: Liberty

Kelly Findley (born September 8, 1970) is a former American soccer coach, having retired as the head coach for the Liberty University Men's Soccer Program at the end of the 2025 season. Findley Previously coached at North Carolina State University. He formerly held the same position at Butler University where he guided the 2008 squad to the fourth highest win total in school history with 13 wins, going 13–3–4. The Bulldogs won the Horizon League championship, and posted their best win–loss ratio since 1998. With a 5-0-3 league record, Butler became the first Horizon League team to post an undefeated conference record since 2003. One of Butler's wins came against fourth ranked UIC.

He previously served as an assistant coach at The University of North Carolina at Charlotte from 2000 to 2004. From 1999 to 2000, he served as the head soccer coach at Mars Hill College going 17–22 in two seasons.

He attended college at Judson University in Elgin, Illinois. He was a four-time all-American soccer player at midfielder there. From 1989 to 1991, he was named Northern Illinois Intercollegiate Conference Player for three consecutive seasons. He was also named Judson's athlete of the year in 1990. He helped the program win its first ever NCCAA National Tournament championship in 1991. He remains fifth place on the school's all-time assists leaderboard with 48 career assists. He is a 2005 inductee to the school's athletic hall of fame. He later spent six seasons as a professional for the Charlotte Eagles.
