= Lassi Hurskainen =

Finnish footballer (born 1987)

- Hurskainen in 2011

Personal information
- Full name: Lassi Elias Hurskainen
- Date of birth: 8 April 1987 (age 39)
- Place of birth: Joensuu, Finland
- Height: 1.80 m (5 ft 11 in)
- Position: Goalkeeper

Team information
- Current team: SexyPöxyt
- Number: 1

Youth career
- 1995–2000: Joensuu Ratanat
- 2001–2002: Joensuun Pallo
- 2003–2005: Jippo Juniors

College career
Years	Team	Apps	(Gls)
2008–2011	UNC Asheville Bulldogs	74	(0)

Senior career*
Years	Team	Apps	(Gls)
2006	SC Riverball	24	(0)
2007	Jippo	19	(0)
2008–2012	SC Riverball	38	(1)
2013–2014	Jippo	30	(0)
2014–2015	HIFK	16	(0)
2015–2016	Töölön Taisto	22	(0)
2018–	SexyPöxyt	23	(0)
- * Club domestic league appearances and goals

Lassi Elias Hurskainen (born 8 April 1987) is a Finnish TV presenter and footballer, who played as a goalkeeper for UNC Asheville Men's Soccer before graduating from UNC Asheville in Fall of 2011.

After moving back to Finland, Hurskainen played for Jippo in Joensuu during 2013–2014. In 2014 Hurskainen moved to Helsinki and joined HIFK Fotboll (Idrottsföreningen Kamraterna Helsingfors), a club founded in 1897. The football section was established in 1907, the same year that the Football Association of Finland was founded. During the season 2014 the team won the Finnish Football League First Division and was promoted into the highest tier of Finnish football, Veikkausliiga. At the same time Hurskainen decided to focus more on football trick shot videos that he had already started to produce during his stay in UNC Asheville. Hurskainen plays occasionally as a goalkeeper for an amateur club Gilla FC in exhibition games and in lower divisions. Hurskainen has also played futsal.

For the 2024 Veikkausliiga season, Hurskainen started as a studio host for Ruutu+ broadcasts.

== Personal life ==
Hurskainen grew up in Joensuu, Finland and attended the Joensuun Lyseon Lukio (Upper secondary school). In 2007, Hurskainen served in the Finnish Defense Forces.

=== YouTube videos ===
On 14 February 2011, Hurskainen had with the help of two friends from UNC Asheville created a football trick shot video inspired by various other sports trick shot videos and uploaded it to YouTube. The video's view count grew to an upwards of 3 million over the course of the next couple weeks and months. The video and subsequent videos were featured on ESPN, Good Morning America, and various global local news channels respectively.

Hurskainen has continued producing football trick shot videos after moving back to Finland. He also worked as a producer for a Finnish Sports TV program Elixir hosting the show for over two years (2013–2015). His own YouTube channel has over 30.000 subscribers and with less than 70 videos he has reached over 11 million viewers. His TOP 3 most viewed videos have been:

1. Lassi Hurskainen Goalkeeper Tricks, over 4,100,000 views
2. Lassi Hurskainen Angry Birds, over 3,500,000 views
3. World Record Football Punch | Robert Helenius vs. Lassi Hurskainen, over 3,000,000 views

In 2016 Hurskainen co-founded a new company called Trick&Treat focusing on social videos.

== Honours and awards ==
=== Individual ===
- 2008 – UNC Asheville Big South All Freshman Team
- 2008 – Elon University Invitational All Tournament Team in the Elon Classic
- 2009 – Hyatt Place Select Invitational All Tournament Team
- 2009 – UNC Asheville Big South Player of the Week
- 2010 – Finnish Football Association Eastern District's "Football Act of the Year" for goal with SC Riverball
- 2010 – Received most Honors for SC Riverball in nationwide Second Division
- 2010 – Hyatt Place Select Invitiational All Tournament Team
- 2010 – UNC Asheville Big South Second Team All Conference
- 2011 – Big South Conference Defensive Player of the Week Honor for games played 26 Sept. – 2 Oct
- 2011 – Big South Conference Defensive Player of the Week Honor for games played 3–9 Oct.
- 2011 – Big South Conference All-Tournament Team Selection

== Stats ==
=== UNCA Career ===
Class	Year	GP	Min	GA	GAA	Saves	Shutouts
Fr.	2008–09	19	1904	24	1.20	77	3
So.	2009–10	18	1622	29	1.61	108	2
Jr.	2010–11	18	1664	31	1.68	96	3
Sr.	2011–12	19	1797	34	1.70	127	3
Career	2008–12	74	6888	118	1.54	408	11

UNCA Year Overviews

- 2008: Played every minute of every match and posted a 1.20 goals. Allowed one goal or less in 12 different matches...stopped five shots and allowed just one goal in 1–1 vs. Southern Conference champion UNC Greensboro (9–14)...made season-high ninesaves in win over Winthrop (10–25)...most goals he allowed were three in 3–1 loss at Lipscomb (9–21)...had a 0.94 goals against average in eight regular-season Big South Conference matches...made all-tournament at Elon Invitational.
- 2009: Earned all-tournament honors at Hyatt Place Select Tournament in Nashville as he helped lead to the Bulldogs to their first tournament title in more than 20 years...stopped an amazing 25 shots in the two matches with 15 vs. Lipscomb (9–18) and then 10 more vs. Belmont (9–20)...Bulldog won both matches 2–1...earned two shutouts on the year with 1–0 victory over ETSU (9–29) and 1–0 triumph at Radford (10–10)...made 108 saves on the year...had nagging injuries throughout the season that caused him to miss three matches.
- 2010: For the second time in his career, he played every minute of every match...produced three shutouts, including back-to-back blankings of Eastern Illinois (9–5) and Brevard College (9–8)...made Kentucky Invitational All-Tournament team...posted shutout of Big South foe Winthrop (11–3)...made season-high 11 saves at High Point (11–16)...also made five saves against the Panthers in Big South Tournament (11–11) and earned spot on Big South All-Tournament team...led Big South in saves with 96...stopped nine shots in 1–1 overtime at Longwood (10–2).
