= 2011 NCAA Division I men's soccer rankings =

Throughout the 2011 NCAA Division I men's soccer season, several sources rank the top men's college soccer programs in the nation based on their results and perceived strength of their opponents. Notable ranking sources include the National Soccer Coaches Association of America, whose poll is the official rankings posted by the NCAA, as well as the Fox Soccer/SBI, Soccer America and TopDrawerSoccer.com polls.

== Current rankings ==
	NSCAA	TopDrawerSoccer.com	Fox Soccer/SBI	Soccer America	SoccerTimes.com	POV
1.	New Mexico	New Mexico	Connecticut	New Mexico	New Mexico	
2.	Creighton	North Carolina	Maryland	North Carolina	Creighton	
3.	North Carolina	Creighton	New Mexico	Maryland	North Carolina	
4.	Maryland	USF	Creighton	Connecticut	Maryland	
5.	South Florida	Connecticut	Louisville	Creighton	South Florida	
6.	Akron	Maryland	St. John's	Akron	Connecticut	
7.	Connecticut	Akron	UCF	USF	Akron	
8.	UCLA	Boston College	Akron	UCLA	UCLA	
9.	Indiana	Indiana	South Florida	Indiana	Boston College	
10.	Boston College	UCLA	New Mexico	Coastal Carolina	Indiana	
11.	Charlotte	Louisville	Notre Dame	Boston College	Charlotte	
12.	James Madison	Virginia	UC Irvine	James Madison	Coastal Carolina	
13.	Coastal Carolina	James Madison	UC Santa Barbara	UCF	Louisville	
14.	UC Irvine	Old Dominion	UCLA	Louisville	UC Irvine	
15.	Louisville	UC Irvine	Indiana	Charlotte	James madison	
16.	Old Dominion	UC Santa Barbara	UC Santa Barbara	UC Santa Barbara	UC Santa Barbara	
17.	UC Santa Barbara	Charlotte	Georgetown	Northwestern	Central Florida	
18.	Notre Dame	Furman	James Madison	UC Irvine	Alabama at Birmingham	
19.	Furman	West Virginia	Cal State Bakersfield	Notre Dame	Notre Dame	
20.	Washington	Ohio State	Northern Illinois	Washington	West Virginia	
21.	UAB	UCF	Coastal Carolina	UAB	Old Dominion	
22.	UCF	Georgetown	Furman	Furman	st. John's	
23.	West Virginia	Notre Dame	UNC Charlotte	Providence	Washington	
24.	Iona	UAB	Xavier	West Virginia	Georgetown	
25.	Providence	Memphis	SMU	Memphis	Furman	

== National Rankings by week ==
Italics represent the ranking for non-ranked teams that received votes.

Team	Week														
Team	P	1	2	3	4	5	6	7	8	9	10	11	12	13	14
New Mexico	NR	NR	NR	16	11	9	6	6	5	2	1	1	1		
Creighton	10	6	5	3	3	2	5	4	6	3	2	2	2		
North Carolina	3	3	1	8	6	5	4	2	2	4	3	3	3		
UCLA	6	13	NR	NR	18	25	15	9	8	12	8	6	4		
Connecticut	8	5	3	2	2	1	1	1	1	5	7	5	5		
Maryland	4	4	2	1	1	3	2	3	3	1	4	4	6		
UC Irvine	24	14	9	5	8	7	7	7	7	9	14	11	7		
Boston College	25	16	8	11	10	13	16	14	18	13	10	13	8		
Indiana	17	18	10	9	7	6	10	18	13	10	9	9	9		
Akron	2	2	4	4	4	4	3	5	4	7	6	7	10		
St. John's	NR	NR	NR	14	12	15	9	21	12	18	NR	21	11		
South Florida	NR	20	11	17	21	16	17	11	9	6	5	10	12		
UC Santa Barbara	14	9	6	6	13	10	19	13	16	23	17	15	13		
Charlotte	NR	NR	NR	19	14	12	14	15	10	16	11	8	15		
Louisville	1	1	7	7	5	8	11	10	15	22	15	14	15		
Northwestern	NR	NR	NR	NR	NR	NR	NR	NR	NR	NR	NR	25	16		
Coastal Carolina	NR	NR	NR	NR	NR	NR	NR	NR	20	17	13	12	17		
Washington	NR	NR	NR	NR	NR	NR	NR	NR	23	20	20	19	18		
SMU	5	17	NR	NR	NR	NR	NR	NR	21	15	NR	NR	19		
UAB	NR	NR	NR	NR	24	NR	NR	NR	NR	NR	21	17	20		
Old Dominion	NR	NR	NR	21	15	20	21	17	11	8	16	18	21		
Furman	NR	NR	NR	NR	25	24	NR	NR	NR	24	19	16	22		
Monmouth	NR	25	18	NR	NR	NR	NR	NR	NR	25	NR	NR	23		
Bradley	NR	NR	NR	18	NR	NR	NR	NR	NR	NR	NR	22	24		
Fairfield	NR	NR	NR	NR	NR	NR	NR	NR	NR	NR	NR	NR	25		
Xavier	NR	NR	NR	NR	NR	NR	23	NR	NR	NR	NR	NR	25		

Source: NCAA
P = Preseason rankings
NR = Not ranked
