= Gideon Asante =

Ghanaian footballer

Personal information
- Date of birth: 1 May 2000 (age 26)
- Place of birth: Sunyani, Ghana
- Height: 1.66 m (5 ft 5 in)
- Positions: Midfielder; forward

Team information
- Current team: Independiente de Ceutí

College career
Years	Team	Apps	(Gls)
2010–2013	Old Dominion Monarchs	73	(15)

Senior career*
Years	Team	Apps	(Gls)
2011	Indiana Invaders	12	(1)
2014	Southern West Virginia King's Warriors	14	(3)
2014	Charlotte Eagles	6	(0)
2019–2020	Alcobendas Sport	10	(0)
2020–2021	Madridejos	11	(0)
2021–	Independiente de Ceutí	25	(3)
- * Club domestic league appearances and goals as of 22 December 2021

Gideon Asante (born 1 May 2000 is a Ghanaian footballer who plays as a midfielder or forward for Spanish club Independiente de Ceutí.

== Career ==
=== College and amateur ===
Asante played four years of college soccer at Old Dominion University between 2010 and 2013.

While at college, Asante played with USL PDL club Indiana Invaders in 2011.

=== Professional career ===
Asante signed with USL Pro club Charlotte Eagles in August 2014 and made his professional debut in a 2–1 loss against Richmond Kickers on 10 August.
