= Albany Great Danes men's soccer =

American college soccer team

- Founded: 1950; 76 years ago
- University: University at Albany, SUNY
- Head coach: Trevor Gorman (17th season)
- Conference: America East
- Location: Albany, New York, US
- Stadium: Bob Ford Field at Tom & Mary Casey Stadium (capacity: 8,500)
- Nickname: Great Danes
- Colors: Purple and gold
Home	Away

NCAA tournament Round of 16
- 2016

NCAA tournament appearances
- 2016, 2017

Conference tournament championships
- 2016, 2017

Conference regular season championships
- 2004, 2015

The Albany Great Danes men's soccer team represents the University at Albany, SUNY in NCAA Division I men's soccer competitions. The Great Danes compete in the America East Conference.

== Players ==
As of 26 Sep 2024

Note: Flags indicate national team as defined under FIFA eligibility rules; some limited exceptions apply. Players may hold more than one non-FIFA nationality.

No.	Pos.	Nation	Player
0	GK	GER	Alexander Genz
1	GK	JPN	Kodai Tsuzuki
2	DF	USA	William Bruce
3	DF	USA	Ethan Cook
4	DF	CAN	Lucas Watt
5	MF	GER	Roko Branko Mrvelj
6	DF	GER	Benedikt Rachor
7	MF	ISL	Ivar Gissurarson
8	MF	CAN	Caleb Vallance
9	MF	USA	David Barkan
10	MF	AUT	Marius Brandmayr
11	FW	USA	Andre Navas
12	FW	JPN	Shawn Tanaka
13	GK	MNE	Andrej Krivokapic
14	MF	USA	Jordan Shullenberger

No.	Pos.	Nation	Player
15	FW	USA	Isaac Filippo
16	MF	ISL	Alexander Clive
17	DF	AUS	John Fragakis
18	DF	USA	Owen Tuttle
19	MF	USA	Omar Galan
20	MF	USA	Brennan McDermott
21	FW	USA	Tommy McFadden
22	DF	ESP	Rodrigo Hermelo
23	MF	USA	Breckin Fett
24	MF	PUR	Marcos Villanueva
25	FW	USA	Zach Lind
26	DF	CAN	David Pepple
27	DF	USA	Luca Grilla
28	DF	USA	David Medina
30	GK	USA	Kevin Gil

== Seasons ==
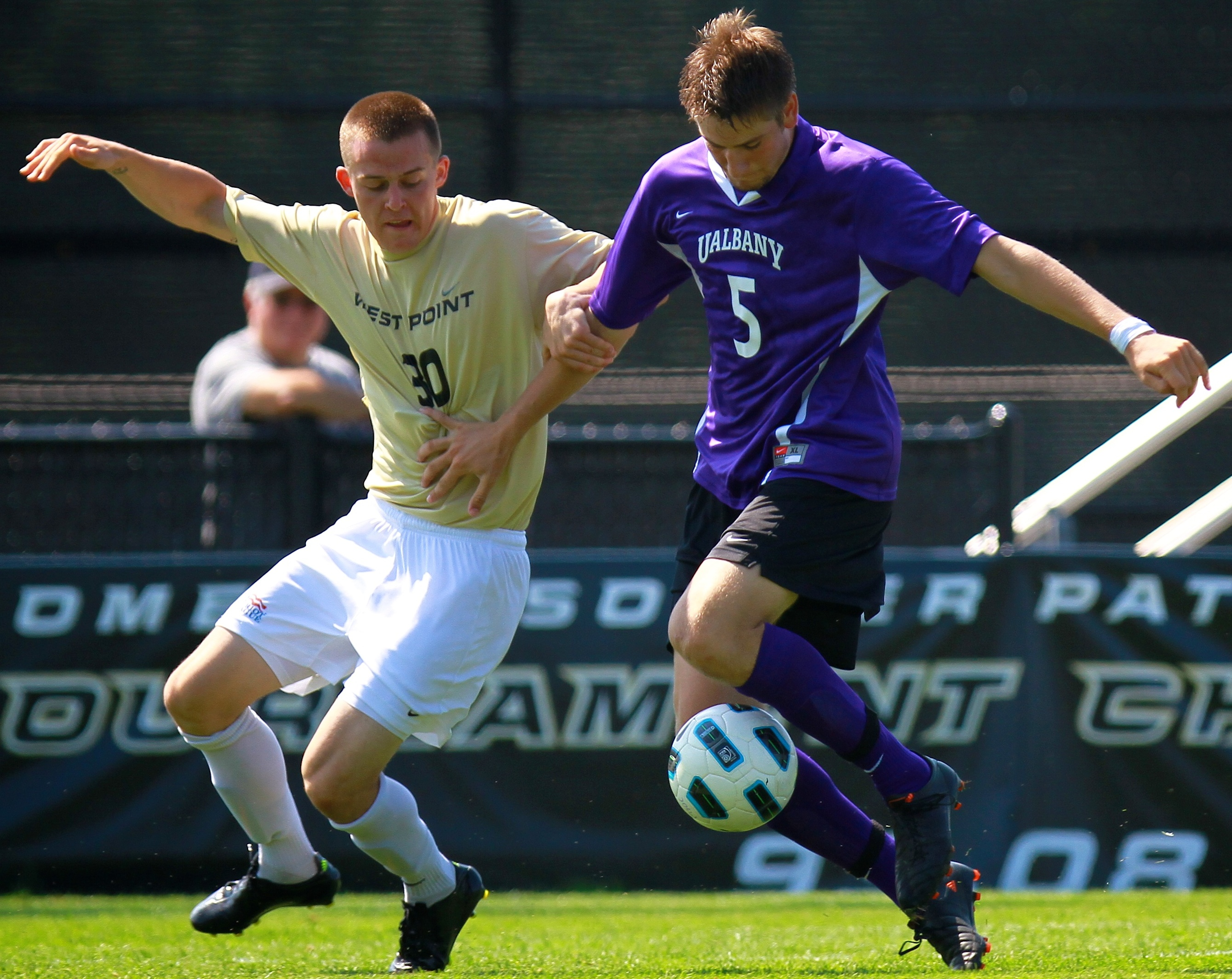
A match between Army and Albany in 2011

=== Division I ===
Albany joined Division I in 1999 and spent two years as an independent before joining the America East Conference. Albany played in Division III and Division II from 1950 until 1998.

Record table
Season	Coach	Overall	Conference	Standing	Postseason
Albany (Division I Independent) (1999–2000)
1999		6–11–1	N/A	N/A	
2000		8–7–3	N/A	N/A	
Division I (Independent):		14–18–4 (.444)			
Albany (America East Conference) (2001–present)
2001		8–9–0	5–6–0	7th	
2002		9–6–2	4–2–2	T–4th	
2003		7–9–2	3–5–1	8th	
2004		12–4–2	6–2–1	T–1st	AEC Semifinals
2005		6–9–4	3–4–1	5th	AEC Semifinals
2006		7–10–2	5–3–0	4th	AEC Quarterfinals
2007		3–10–4	2–3–3	8th	
2008		12–4–2	5–1–2	2nd	AEC Semifinals
2009		0–13–3	0–6–1	8th	
2010	Trevor Gorman	5–10–1	1–5–1	8th	
2011	Trevor Gorman	6–10–3	1–3–3	6th	AEC Semifinals
2012	Trevor Gorman	6–11–1	3–4–0	5th	AEC Quarterfinals
2013	Trevor Gorman	6–11–4	3–3–1	T–4th	AEC Semifinals
2014	Trevor Gorman	4–9–6	2–4–1	5th	AEC Quarterfinals
2015	Trevor Gorman	10–8–1	5–2–0	1st	AEC Semifinals
2016	Trevor Gorman	13–6–2	4–2–1	T–2nd	AEC Champions; NCAA Second Round
2017	Trevor Gorman	14–5–3	4–2–1	T–3rd	AEC Champions; NCAA Second Round
2018	Trevor Gorman	8–10–0	3–4–0	6th	AEC Quarterfinals
2019	Trevor Gorman	9–7–1	4–3–0	4th	AEC Quarterfinals
2020	Trevor Gorman	3–5–1	2–4–0	T–2nd	
2021	Trevor Gorman	10–7–1	4–3–1	3rd	AEC Quarterfinals
2022	Trevor Gorman	6–8–6	3–1–3	4th	AEC Finals
2023	Trevor Gorman	5–11–1	1–5–1	7th	
2024	Trevor Gorman	4–12–2	1–5–1	8th	
2025	Trevor Gorman	5–6–6	3–2–2	3rd	AEC Quarterfinals
Division I (1999–):		192–228–64 (.463)	77–84–27 (.481)		
Division I (2001–):		178–210–60 (.464)	77–84–27 (.481)		
Total:		509–507–112 (.501)			
National champion Postseason invitational champion Conference regular season champion Conference regular season and conference tournament champion Division regular season champion Division regular season and conference tournament champion Conference tournament champion

=== NCAA tournament results ===
Albany has appeared in two NCAA tournaments.

Year	Record	Seed	Region	Round	Opponent	Results
2016	14–5–3	14	3	Second round Sweet Sixteen	Boston College; Clemson	W 3–0; L 1–3
2017	12–5–2	Unseeded	4	First round Second round	Maryland; Western Michigan	W 0–0 (5–4 p); L 0–2
