= CD Molinense =

Association football club in Spain

Molinense
- Full name: Club Deportivo Molinense
- Founded: 1952; 1971 (refounded)
- Dissolved: 2009
- Ground: Sánchez Cánovas, Molina de Segura, Region of Murcia, Spain
- Capacity: 5,000
- 2008–09: Territorial Preferente, 16th of 20
Home colours	Away colours

Club Deportivo Molinense was a football team based in Molina de Segura, in the Region of Murcia. Founded in 1952 and refounded in 1971, the club was dissolved in 2009, and last played in Territorial Preferente.

== History ==
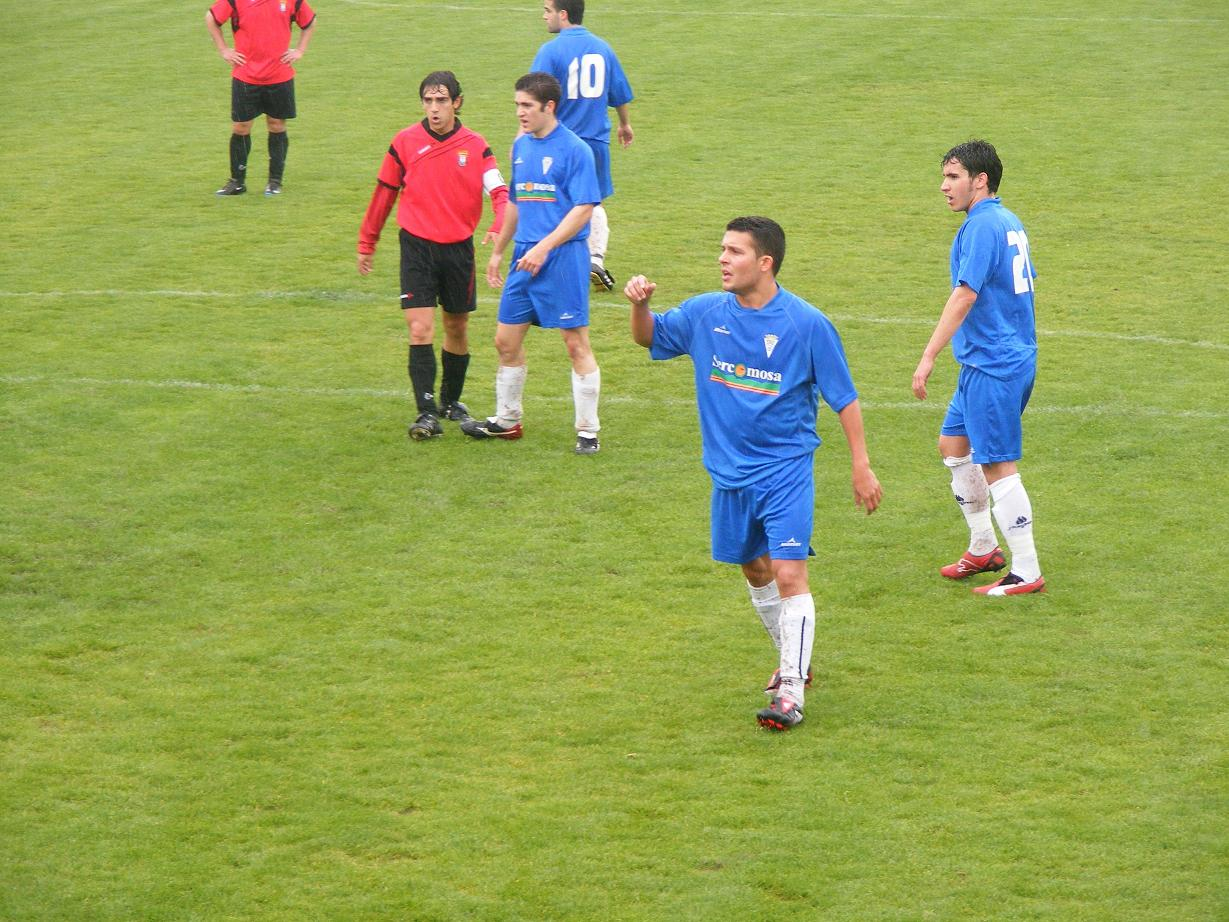
Molinense playing against CFB Abarán in 2009

Football in the city of Molina de Segura began in the 1920s with Sport Club Molinense, with Los Luíses Football Club and Club Deportivo Molinense Balompié also being active in the period. In the 1930s and after the Spanish Civil War, several clubs were created in the city, but none of them were able to establish themselves until the creation of CD Molinense in 1952.

Molinense went on to play a small number of seasons in the 1950s before being refounded in 1971, playing for several seasons in Tercera División before officially ceasing activities in 2009. After the club's dissolution, a new club named Unión Molinense CF is considered the heir of the club.

== Season to season ==
Season	Tier	Division	Place	Copa del Rey
1952–53	5	2ª Reg.	2nd	
1953–54	4	1ª Reg.	10th	
1954–55	4	1ª Reg.	2nd	
1955–56	DNP			
1956–57	4	1ª Reg.	8th	
1957–1971	DNP			
1971–72	6	2ª Reg.	12th	
1972–73	6	2ª Reg.	3rd	
1973–74	6	2ª Reg.	1st	
1974–75	5	1ª Reg.	1st	
1975–76	4	Reg. Pref.	6th	
1976–77	4	Reg. Pref.	16th	
1977–78	5	Reg. Pref.	2nd	
1978–79	5	Reg. Pref.	9th	
1979–80	5	Reg. Pref.	9th	
1980–81	4	3ª	15th	
1981–82	4	3ª	8th	
1982–83	4	3ª	14th	

Season	Tier	Division	Place	Copa del Rey
1983–84	4	3ª	19th	
1984–85	5	Reg. Pref.	12th	
1985–86	5	Reg. Pref.	19th	
1986–87	5	Reg. Pref.	20th	
1987–1996	DNP			
1996–97	5	Terr. Pref.	13th	
1997–98	5	Terr. Pref.	9th	
1998–99	5	Terr. Pref.	1st	
1999–2000	4	3ª	8th	
2000–01	4	3ª	16th	
2001–02	4	3ª	16th	
2002–03	4	3ª	16th	
2003–04	4	3ª	14th	
2004–05	4	3ª	12th	
2005–06	4	3ª	12th	
2006–07	4	3ª	18th	
2007–08	5	Terr. Pref.	7th	
2008–09	5	Terr. Pref.	16th	

- 12 seasons in Tercera División
