= 2026 CT United FC season =

CT United FC
2026 season
- Head coach: Shavar Thomas
- Stadium: Morrone Stadium, Storrs; Reese Stadium, New Haven
- MLS Next Pro: Conference Semifinals
- Top goalscorer: League: (Hungary) Barnabás Tanyi (16 Goals); All: (Hungary) Barnabás Tanyi (18 Goals)
- Biggest win: 7–2 vs Inter Miami CF II, September 20
- Biggest defeat: 1–4 vs NYCFC II, June 26; 1–4 at Atlanta United 2 September 8

The 2026 CT United FC season is the first season in CT United FC club history. The club competes in MLS Next Pro. The club's home matches will be played at Morrone Stadium in Storrs, Reese Stadium in New Haven, and Knights Field in Bridgeport.

Shavar Thomas was named the club's first head coach on December 23, 2025.

== Current roster ==
As of August 23, 2026

Note: Flags indicate national team as defined under FIFA eligibility rules; some limited exceptions apply. Players may hold more than one non-FIFA nationality.

| No. | Pos. | Nation | Player |
|---|---|---|---|
| 1 | GK | MEX | Anthony Ramos |
| 3 | DF | ESA | Nelson Rodriguez |
| 4 | DF | USA | Richard Hauth |
| 5 | DF | FIN | Michael Boamah |
| 6 | DF | PAN | Reyniel Perdomo |
| 7 | FW | HUN | Barnabás Tanyi |
| 8 | MF | UGA | Steven Sserwadda (on loan from New York Red Bulls II) |
| 9 | FW | BRA | Cauã Paixão |
| 11 | FW | ENG | Laurie Goddard |
| 12 | DF | USA | Lukas Kamrath |
| 13 | MF | PHI | Alex Monis (captain) |
| 14 | MF | USA | Dylan Lacy |
| 15 | MF | USA | Jahvar Stevenson |
| 16 | DF | USA | Neo Che (on loan from Austin FC II) |
| 17 | MF | USA | Warren Agostoni |
| 18 | MF | USA | Sean Petrie |
| 20 | DF | SEN | Justin Malou |

| No. | Pos. | Nation | Player |
|---|---|---|---|
| 21 | DF | USA | Rickson van Hees |
| 22 | DF | BRB | Andre Applewhaite |
| 23 | GK | USA | Gunther Rankenburg |
| 24 | MF | USA | Daniel D'lppolito |
| 27 | FW | ENG | Laurie Goddard |
| 30 | FW | PAN | Ernesto Gómez |
| 31 | FW | USA | Robbie Mora |
| 40 | MF | USA | Giovanni Corsetti |
| 44 | MF | USA | Jeremy Medranda |
| 46 | MF | USA | Niko Koloniaris |
| 47 | MF | USA | Ayden Wolanski |
| 70 | MF | HAI | Bryan Destin |
| 77 | MF | USA | Jamison Ping (on loan from Phoenix Rising FC) |
| 99 | MF | USA | Hivan Kouonang |

1. Next Pro Academy Contract

== Transfers ==
=== In ===
| Pos | Player | Transferred from | Fee | Date | Source |
|---|---|---|---|---|---|
| FW | (Hungary) Barnabás Tanyi | (Slovenia) NK Aluminij | Free | December 26, 2025 | |
| DF | (Barbados) Andre Applewhaite | (Barbados) Weymouth Wales FC | Free | December 27, 2025 | |
| DF | (El Salvador) Nelson Rodriguez | (El Salvador) CD Águila | Free | December 28, 2025 | |
| FW | (Brazil) Cauã Paixão | (Brazil) Vasco da Gama | Free | December 29, 2025 | |
| DF | (United States) Lukas Kamrath | (United States) High Point Panthers | Free | December 30, 2025 | |
| MF | (United States) Hivan Kouonang | (Germany) SG Wattenscheid 09 | Free | January 2, 2026 | |
| DF | (Finland) Michael Boamah | (Finland) HJK | Undisclosed | January 3, 2026 | |
| DF | (United States) Richard Hauth | (Germany) Greuther Fürth II | Free | January 4, 2026 | |
| GK | (Mexico) Anthony Ramos | (Mexico) Tigres UANL | Free | January 5, 2026 | |
| MF | (United States) Daniel D’Ippolito | (United States) Fordham Rams | Free | January 6, 2026 | |
| MF | (United States) Robbie Mora | (United States) Gonzaga Bulldogs | Free | January 7, 2026 | |
| MF | (Uganda) Steven Sserwadda | (United States) New York Red Bulls II | Loan | January 9, 2026 | |
| MF | (Uganda) Ibrahim Kasule | (United States) New York Red Bulls II | Loan | January 9, 2026 | |
| MF | (United States) Sean Petrie | (United States) Real Monarchs | Free | January 10, 2026 | |
| FW | (United States) Laurie Goddard | (United States) Hofstra Pride | Free | January 12, 2026 | |
| MF | (Panama) Ernesto Gómez | (Panama) Club Deportivo Universitario | Loan | January 14, 2026 | |
| MF | (Philippines) Alex Monis | (United States) New England Revolution II | Free | January 17, 2026 | |
| GK | (United States) Gunther Rankenberg | (United States) Greenville Triumph SC | Free | January 28, 2026 | |
| DF | (United States) Rickson van Hees | (Netherlands) Jong Utrecht | Free | January 30, 2026 | |
| DF | (United States) Jahvar Stephenson | (United States) Loyola Greyhounds | Free | February 11, 2026 | |
| DF | (Panama) Reyniel Perdomo | (Panama) Alianza FC | Loan | February 24, 2026 | |
| MF | (United States) Warren Agostoni | (United States) Pittsburgh Riverhounds SC | Free | July 13, 2026 | |
| MF | (Senegal) Justin Malou | (United States) Tormenta FC | Free | July 28, 2026 | |
| FW | (Haiti) Bryan Destin | (Slovenia) NK Tabor Sežana | Free | August 4, 2026 | |
| DF | (United States) Neo Che | (United States) Austin FC II | Loan | August 5, 2026 | |
| MF | (United States) Jamison Ping | (United States) Phoenix Rising FC | Loan | August 21, 2026 | |

=== Out ===
| Pos | Player | Reason | Transferred To | Fee | Date | Source |
|---|---|---|---|---|---|---|
| MF | (Uganda) Ibrahim Kasule | Contract mutually terminated by New York Red Bulls II | (Uganda) KCCA FC | N/A | August 10, 2026 | |

== Competitions ==
=== Friendlies ===
| February 11 | New York Cosmos | v | CT United FC | Paterson, New Jersey |
| | | | | Stadium: Hinchliffe Stadium |
Note: No final score was announced.

=== Regular Season ===
| March 1 1 | FC Cincinnati 2 | 1–3 | CT United FC | Highland Heights, Kentucky |
| 6:00 PM EDT | Chirilă 71' (pen.) | Report | Stephenson (yellow card) 34'; Mora 45' (yellow card) 69'; Monis 78' (yellow card) 82'; Kasule 90' | Stadium: NKU Soccer Stadium; Referee: Edson Carvajal |

| March 8 2 | Chattanooga FC | 4–2 | CT United FC | Chattanooga, Tennessee |
| 3:00 PM EDT | Robertson 23'; McGrath 37'; Krehl 41', 57'; Mangarov (yellow card) 90+3' | Report | Kasule 21'; Rodriguez (yellow card) 32'; Mora (yellow card) 54'; Kamrath (yellow card) 60'; Lacy 74'; van Hees (yellow card) 88' | Stadium: Finley Stadium; Attendance: 2,237; Referee: Stefan Perri |

| March 15 3 | Philadelphia Union II | 1–2 | CT United FC | Chester, Pennsylvania |
| 3:00 PM EDT | Cobo (yellow card) 15' (yellow-red card) 61'; Pratt (yellow card) 16'; Jakupovic 42'; Sequera (yellow card) 80' | Report | Monis (yellow card) 28'; Applewhaite (yellow card) 36'; Goddard 57'; Tanyi 86'; D’Ippolito (yellow card) 89' | Stadium: Subaru Park; Referee: Stephen Foster |

| March 22 4 | New England Revolution II | 2–0 | CT United FC | Smithfield, Rhode Island |
| 2:00 PM EDT | Da 18' (yellow card) 20'; Fry 56'; Zambrano (yellow card) 76'; Siqueira (yellow card) 88' | Report | Stephenson (yellow card) 63'; Tanyi (yellow card) 90+5' | Stadium: Beirne Stadium; Referee: Jorge Escobar |

| April 11 5 | CT United FC | 1–3 | Columbus Crew 2 | Storrs, Connecticut |
| 5:00 PM EDT | Stephenson (yellow card) 43'; Monis 45+4'; Sserwadda (yellow card) 54'; Mora (yellow card) 90+1' | Report | Rogers (yellow card) 11'; Zengue 17', 40'; Elliot (yellow card) 45+3'; Taylor 81' | Stadium: Morrone Stadium; Referee: Walterson Torchson |

| April 19 6 | NYCFC II | 2–1 | CT United FC | Queens, New York City, New York |
| 4:00 PM EDT | Smith (yellow card) 17'; Carrizo (yellow card) 26'; Musu 47'; Samb (yellow card) 57' (yellow-red card) 80' (goal) 68'; Molinari (yellow card) 90+2' | Report | Mora (yellow card) 32' (yellow-red card) 77'; Goddard 45'; Kasule (yellow card) 50'; Monis (yellow card) 62'; Kamrath (yellow card) 88' | Stadium: Belson Stadium; Referee: Colby Johnson |

| April 26 7 | CT United FC | 1–2 | Philadelphia Union II | Storrs, Connecticut |
| 3:00 PM EDT | Paixão 19'; Medranda (yellow card) 66' | Report | Davis 37'; Korzeniowski 62'; Cobo (yellow card) 90+2' | Stadium: Morrone Stadium; Referee: Shaye Lane |

| May 3 8 | CT United FC | 0–0 (6–5 p) | New England Revolution II | Storrs, Connecticut |
| 6:00 PM EDT | Perdomo (yellow card) 39'; Sserwadda (yellow card) 82' | Report | Dahlin (yellow card) 60'; Oyirwoth (yellow card) 63'; Mimy (yellow card) 69'; Parisian (yellow card) | Stadium: Morrone Stadium; Referee: Gary Gutierrez |
| | Penalties |
| | Applewhaite (penalty scored); Kouonang (penalty scored); Goddard (penalty scored); Kamrath (penalty scored); Perdomo (penalty scored); Tanyi (penalty scored) | | (penalty scored) Oyirwoth; (penalty scored) Shannon; (penalty scored) Morgan; (penalty scored) Siqureira; (penalty scored) McIntosh; (penalty missed) Sasaki |

| May 16 9 | CT United FC | 0–2 | Toronto FC II | New Haven, Connecticut |
| 7:00 PM EDT | Applewhaite (yellow card) 15'; Gómez (yellow card) 25'; Goddard (yellow card) 49' | Report | Boneau (yellow card) 8'; Pinnock (yellow card) 45'; Omoregbe (yellow card) 49'; Fisher (yellow card) 51'; Nue-Brito 86'; Khodri 90+4' (yellow card) 90+5' | Stadium: Reese Stadium; Referee: Ryan Homik |

| May 24 10 | New York Red Bulls II | 1–3 | CT United FC | Montclair, New Jersey |
| 7:00 PM EDT | Worth (yellow card) 32'; Gjengaar 52'; Jimenez (yellow card) 53'; Faello (yellow card) 53'; Modelo (yellow card) 89' | Report | Tanyi 30', 43'; Rankenburg (yellow card) 54'; Stephenson (yellow card) 78'; Monis 90' (pen.); Lacy (yellow card) 90+5' | Stadium: MSU Soccer Park; Referee: Laadi Issaka |

| May 30 11 | Huntsville City FC | 2–2 (0–3 p) | CT United FC | Huntsville, Alabama |
| 8:00 PM EDT | Véliz (yellow card) 22'; Ekk 44'; Molina 78' | Report | Monis 8'; Applewhaite (yellow card) 19'; Lacy (yellow card) 27'; Mora (yellow card) 27'; D’Ippolito 67' | Stadium: Wicks Family Field at Joe Davis Stadium; Referee: Laith Dahhan |
| | Penalties |
| | Inguez (penalty missed); Jarvis (penalty missed); Pariano (penalty missed) | | (penalty scored) Applewhaite; (penalty missed) Lacy; (penalty scored) Kamrath; (penalty scored) Monis |

| June 6 12 | Columbus Crew 2 | 2–1 | CT United FC | Columbus, Ohio |
| 6:00 PM EDT | Elliot (yellow card) 35'; Karumanchi (yellow card) 28'; Zengue 75'; Gbamblé 90+1'; Chirinos (yellow card) 90+2' | Report | Gómez (yellow card) 20'; Stephenson (yellow card) 67'; Tanyi 90+8' | Stadium: ScottsMiracle-Gro Field; Referee: Shawn Tehini |

| June 14 13 | Toronto FC II | 2–4 | CT United FC | North York, Toronto, Ontario |
| 3:00 PM EDT | Dixon 22' (red card) 61'; Kerr 82' | Report | D’Ippolito 33', 36' (yellow card) 52'; Monis (yellow card) 54' (goal) 63' (pen.); Applewhaite 88'; Koloniaris (yellow card) 90+1' | Stadium: York Lions Stadium; Referee: Fabrizio Stasolla |

| June 18 14 | CT United FC | 4–0 | FC Cincinnati 2 | New Haven, Connecticut |
| 7:00 PM EDT | Tanyi 3', 87'; Applewhaite 28'; Lacy 31'; Sserwadda (yellow card) 49'; Gómez (yellow card) 56' | Report | Lachekar (yellow card) 12'; Holmes (yellow card) 84' | Stadium: Reese Stadium; Referee: Braeden Frey |

| June 26 15 | CT United FC | 1–4 | NYCFC II | New Haven, Connecticut |
| 6:00 PM EDT | Tanyi 28'; Lacy (yellow card) 49'; Petrie (yellow card) 78' | Report | Lopez 20' (yellow card) 21' (yellow-red card) 81'; Musu 45+2', 70'; Ponce 68'; Flax (yellow card) 82'; Campos (yellow card) 90+2' | Stadium: Reese Stadium; Referee: Jeremy Scheer |

| July 5 16 | CT United FC | 3–1 | Carolina Core FC | New Haven, Connecticut |
| 6:00 PM EDT | Tanyi 14'; Petrie (yellow card) 36'; Stephenson (yellow card) 45+2'; Kouonang 50'; D’Ippolito 54'; Applewhaite (yellow card) 86' | Report | Baer (yellow card) 20'; Orbaugh (yellow card) 41'; Tattevin 45+5'; Swineheart (yellow card) 89'; Balogun (yellow card) 90+7' | Stadium: Reese Stadium; Referee: Russell Miller |

| July 12 17 | CT United FC | 3–2 | Toronto FC II | New Haven, Connecticut |
| 5:00 PM EDT | Monis 41'; Tanyi 66'; Paixão 83'; Agostoni (yellow card) 89' | Report | Barrow 60'; Nolan 71'; Fisher (yellow card) 90+4' | Stadium: Reese Stadium; Referee: Marie Durr |

| July 19 18 | CT United FC | 2–1 | New York Red Bulls II | New Haven, Connecticut |
| 6:00 PM EDT | Lacy 2', 90+2'; Applewhaite (yellow card) 61'; Kasule (yellow card) 90+5' | Report | Gallagher (yellow card) 25'; Nelich 26'; Bori (yellow card) 64'; Kone (yellow card) 72'; Rodriguez (yellow card) 82' | Stadium: Reese Stadium; Referee: Andrew Porada |

| July 26 19 | CT United FC | 2–1 | Columbus Crew 2 | New Haven, Connecticut |
| 6:00 PM EDT | Monis 19' (pen.); Applewhaite 51' | Report | Danjaji 11'; Ewing (yellow card) 15'; Aoki (yellow card) 71' | Stadium: Reese Stadium; Referee: Lauren Aldrich |

| August 1 20 | CT United FC | 4–2 | Orlando City B | New Haven, Connecticut |
| 7:00 PM EDT | Mora (yellow card) 30'; Applewhaite 36'; Tanyi 38'; Lacy 53'; D’Ippolito 61' | Report | Okonski 31'; Trombino (yellow card) 90'; Belgodere 90+3' | Stadium: Reese Stadium; Referee: Shevket Dzhaparov |

| August 9 21 | CT United FC | 1–2 | New England Revolution II | New Haven, Connecticut |
| 3:00 PM EDT | Sserwadda (yellow card) 32'; Lacy (yellow card) 45+2'; Paixão 46'; Petrie (yellow card) 76'; Kamrath (yellow card) 83' | Report | Baptiste 8'; Wells (yellow card) 37'; Morgan 55' | Stadium: Reese Stadium; Referee: Nick Karnovsky |

| August 16 22 | FC Cincinnati 2 | 2–3 | CT United FC | Highland Heights, Kentucky |
| 6:00 PM EDT | Chirilă 18', 25'; Mrozek (yellow card) 67'; Sphire (yellow card) 82' | Report | Boamah (yellow card) 14'; Lacy 45+2'; Applewhaite (yellow card) 60'; Stephenson (yellow card) 63'; Monis 68' (pen.) (yellow card) 90+4'; Destin 75' | Stadium: NKU Soccer Stadium; Referee: Salvador Flores |

| August 19 23 | Crown Legacy FC | 0–2 | CT United FC | Matthews, North Carolina |
| 7:00 PM EDT | Longo (yellow card) 42' (yellow-red card) 51'; Coulibaly (yellow card) 54' | Report | Lacy (yellow card) 10'; Destin 16'; Gómez (yellow card) 24'; Paixão (yellow card) 58'; Tanyi 73'; Mora (yellow card) 74' | Stadium: Sportsplex at Matthews; Referee: Daniel Emeri |

| August 23 24 | Philadelphia Union II | 2–4 | CT United FC | Chester, Pennsylvania |
| 3:00 PM EDT | Griffin (yellow card) 6'; Olivas (yellow card) 20'; LeBlanc (yellow card) 24'; Moore (yellow card) 48' (yellow-red card) 84'; Korzeniowski 55' (pen.), 61' (yellow card) 58' | Report | Lacy 1'; Mora (yellow card) 4'; Destin 13', 45+3' (yellow card) 44'; Tanyi 45+2' (yellow card) 54'; Sserwadda (yellow card) 69'; D’Ippolito (yellow card) 85'; Monis (yellow card) 90+12' | Stadium: Kinetic Field at WSFS Bank Sportsplex Stadium; Referee: Danielle Chesky |

| August 29 25 | CT United FC | 2–4 | New York Red Bulls II | Bridgeport, Connecticut |
| 7:00 PM EDT | Tanyi 16'; Gómez (yellow card) 40'; Kamrath (yellow card) 78'; Destin 80' | Report | Kone (yellow card) 45+2'; Sánchez (yellow card) 59'; Mitchell 61', 85'; Benedetti (yellow card) 72'; Gallagher 83', 90' | Stadium: Knights Field; Referee: Walterson Torchson |

| September 8 26 | Atlanta United 2 | 4–1 | CT United FC | Marietta, Georgia |
| 2:00 PM EDT | Chica 22'; Jardines (yellow card) 28'; Boamah 66' (o.g.); Dunbar (yellow card) 74' (goal) 85'; Dovlo (yellow card) 89'; Kamrath 90+4' (o.g.) | Report | Applewhaite (yellow card) 53'; Tanyi (red card) 54'; D’Ippolito 79' | Stadium: Children's Healthcare of Atlanta Training Ground; Referee: Anthony Sobolevsky |

| September 13 27 | NYCFC II | 1–0 | CT United FC | Manhattan, New York City, New York |
| 5:00 PM EDT | Sunjic 59'; Pierre (yellow card) 74'; Carrizo (yellow card) 89' | Report | | Stadium: Icahn Stadium; Referee: Richonne Clark |

| September 20 28 | CT United FC | 7–2 | Inter Miami CF II | Bridgeport, Connecticut |
| 2:00 PM EDT | Destin 12', 27', 53'; Tanyi 58', 72', 88'; D’Ippolito 90+4' | Report | Padilla (yellow card) 29'; White (yellow card) 37'; Applewhaite 42' (o.g.); Convers (yellow card) 45+4'; Flores 51' | Stadium: Knights Field; Referee: Ryan Homik |

==== Playoffs ====
| October 16 Conference Quarterfinals | Atlanta United 2 | 0–1 | CT United FC | Marietta, Georgia |
| 6:00 PM ET | Senanou (yellow card) 80'; Cisset (yellow card) 90+13' | Report | Tanyi 5' | Stadium: Children’s Healthcare of Atlanta Training Ground; Referee: Jaclyn Metz |

| October 25 Conference Semifinals | Chattanooga FC | 3–1 | CT United FC | Chattanooga, Tennessee |
| 5:00 PM ET | Jones (yellow card) 59'; Robertson 61'; Krehl 70'; Louis-Jean 83' | Report | Sserwadda (yellow card) 60'; Tanyi 65' | Stadium: Finley Stadium; Attendance: 3,051; Referee: Gerald Flores |

=== Statistics ===
Numbers after plus-sign(+) denote appearances as a substitute.

==== Appearances and goals ====
| No. | Pos | Nat | Player | Total | | MLS Next Pro | | MLSNP Playoffs | |
| No. | Pos | Nat | Player | Apps | Goals | Apps | Goals | Apps | Goals |
|---|---|---|---|---|---|---|---|---|---|
| 1 | GK | (Mexico) MEX | Anthony Ramos | 6 | 0 | 6+0 | 0 | 0+0 | 0 |
| 3 | DF | (El Salvador) ESA | Nelson Rodriguez | 3 | 0 | 1+2 | 0 | 0+0 | 0 |
| 4 | DF | (United States) USA | Richard Hauth | 3 | 0 | 2+1 | 0 | 0+0 | 0 |
| 5 | DF | (Finland) FIN | Michael Boamah | 16 | 0 | 12+4 | 0 | 0+0 | 0 |
| 6 | DF | (Panama) PAN | Reyniel Perdomo | 5 | 0 | 3+2 | 0 | 0+0 | 0 |
| 7 | FW | (Hungary) HUN | Barnabás Tanyi | 28 | 18 | 22+4 | 16 | 2+0 | 2 |
| 8 | MF | (Uganda) UGA | Steven Sserwadda | 19 | 0 | 16+1 | 0 | 2+0 | 0 |
| 9 | FW | (Brazil) BRA | Cauã Paixão | 24 | 3 | 8+15 | 3 | 0+1 | 0 |
| 11 | MF | (Panama) PAN | Ernesto Gómez | 23 | 0 | 15+6 | 0 | 2+0 | 0 |
| 12 | DF | (United States) USA | Lukas Kamrath | 30 | 0 | 26+2 | 0 | 2+0 | 0 |
| 13 | MF | (Philippines) PHI | Alex Monis | 30 | 8 | 27+1 | 8 | 2+0 | 0 |
| 14 | MF | (United States) USA | Dylan Lacy | 27 | 7 | 20+5 | 7 | 2+0 | 0 |
| 15 | DF | (United States) USA | Jahvar Stephenson | 19 | 0 | 14+4 | 0 | 0+1 | 0 |
| 16 | DF | (United States) USA | Neo Che | 6 | 0 | 0+4 | 0 | 1+1 | 0 |
| 17 | MF | (United States) USA | Warren Agostoni | 10 | 0 | 4+5 | 0 | 0+1 | 0 |
| 18 | MF | (United States) USA | Sean Petrie | 7 | 0 | 3+4 | 0 | 0+0 | 0 |
| 19 | MF | (Uganda) UGA | Ibrahim Kasule | 10 | 2 | 6+4 | 2 | 0+0 | 0 |
| 20 | DF | (Senegal) SEN | Justin Malou | 4 | 0 | 1+1 | 0 | 2+0 | 0 |
| 21 | DF | (United States) USA | Rickson van Hees | 29 | 0 | 21+6 | 0 | 2+0 | 0 |
| 22 | DF | (Barbados) BRB | Andre Applewhaite | 27 | 4 | 23+3 | 4 | 1+0 | 0 |
| 23 | GK | (United States) USA | Gunther Rankenburg | 24 | 0 | 22+0 | 0 | 2+0 | 0 |
| 24 | MF | (United States) USA | Daniel D’Ippolito | 29 | 7 | 14+13 | 7 | 0+2 | 0 |
| 27 | FW | (England) ENG | Laurie Goddard | 20 | 2 | 7+13 | 2 | 0+0 | 0 |
| 31 | MF | (United States) USA | Robbie Mora | 21 | 1 | 17+2 | 1 | 0+2 | 0 |
| 40 | MF | (United States) USA | Giovanni Corsetti | 3 | 0 | 1+2 | 0 | 0+0 | 0 |
| 44 | MF | (United States) USA | Jeremy Medranda | 8 | 0 | 3+5 | 0 | 0+0 | 0 |
| 46 | MF | (United States) USA | Niko Koloniaris | 8 | 0 | 2+6 | 0 | 0+0 | 0 |
| 47 | MF | (United States) USA | Ayden Wolanski | 6 | 0 | 3+3 | 0 | 0+0 | 0 |
| 57 | MF | (United States) USA | Darrius Hyte | 2 | 0 | 0+1 | 0 | 0+1 | 0 |
| 70 | MF | (Haiti) HAI | Bryan Destin | 10 | 8 | 6+2 | 8 | 2+0 | 0 |
| 77 | MF | (United States) USA | Jamison Ping | 4 | 0 | 0+4 | 0 | 0+0 | 0 |
| 99 | MF | (United States) USA | Hivan Kouonang | 10 | 1 | 3+7 | 1 | 0+0 | 0 |

- Last updated: October 25, 2026
- Source: https://www.mlsnextpro.com/clubs/connecticut-united-fc/stats/#season=MLS-SEA-0001KA&competition=mls-next-pro&club=MLS-CLU-000092&statType=general&position=all

==== Top scorers ====
| Rank | Position | Number | Name | MLS Next Pro | MLSNP Playoffs | Total |
|---|---|---|---|---|---|---|
| 1 | FW | 7 | (Hungary) Barnabás Tanyi | 16 | 2 | 18 |
| 2 | MF | 13 | (Philippines) Alex Monis | 8 | 0 | 8 |
| 2 | MF | 70 | (Haiti) Bryan Destin | 8 | 0 | 8 |
| 4 | MF | 14 | (United States) Dylan Lacy | 7 | 0 | 7 |
| 4 | MF | 24 | (United States) Daniel D’Ippolito | 7 | 0 | 7 |
| 6 | DF | 22 | (Barbados) Andre Applewhaite | 4 | 0 | 4 |
| 7 | FW | 9 | (Brazil) Cauã Paixão | 3 | 0 | 3 |
| 8 | MF | 18 | (Uganda) Ibrahim Kasule | 2 | 0 | 2 |
| 8 | FW | 27 | (England) Laurie Goddard | 2 | 0 | 2 |
| 10 | MF | 31 | (United States) Robbie Mora | 1 | 0 | 1 |
| 10 | MF | 99 | (United States) Hivan Kouonang | 1 | 0 | 1 |
| Total | | | | 59 | 2 | 61 |

- Last updated: October 25, 2026
- Source: https://www.mlsnextpro.com/clubs/connecticut-united-fc/stats/#season=MLS-SEA-0001KA&competition=mls-next-pro&club=MLS-CLU-000092&statType=general&position=all

==== Top assists ====
| Rank | Position | Number | Name | MLS Next Pro | MLSNP Playoffs | Total |
|---|---|---|---|---|---|---|
| 1 | FW | 7 | (Hungary) Barnabás Tanyi | 7 | 0 | 7 |
| 1 | MF | 13 | (Philippines) Alex Monis | 7 | 0 | 7 |
| 1 | MF | 24 | (United States) Daniel D’Ippolito | 7 | 0 | 7 |
| 4 | MF | 31 | (United States) Robbie Mora | 5 | 0 | 5 |
| 5 | MF | 14 | (United States) Dylan Lacy | 4 | 0 | 4 |
| 5 | DF | 22 | (Barbados) Andre Applewhaite | 4 | 0 | 4 |
| 7 | DF | 21 | (United States) Rickson van Hees | 3 | 0 | 3 |
| 8 | FW | 9 | (Brazil) Cauã Paixão | 2 | 0 | 2 |
| 8 | DF | 12 | (United States) Lukas Kamrath | 2 | 0 | 2 |
| 8 | MF | 8 | (Uganda) Steven Sserwadda | 1 | 1 | 2 |
| 11 | MF | 13 | (Philippines) Alex Monis | 1 | 0 | 1 |
| 11 | MF | 17 | (United States) Warren Agostoni | 1 | 0 | 1 |
| 11 | FW | 27 | (England) Laurie Goddard | 1 | 0 | 1 |
| 11 | MF | 44 | (United States) Jeremy Medranda | 1 | 0 | 1 |
| 11 | MF | 70 | (Haiti) Bryan Destin | 1 | 0 | 1 |
| Total | | | | 46 | 1 | 47 |

- Last updated: October 25, 2026
- Source: https://www.mlsnextpro.com/clubs/chattanooga-fc/stats/#season=MLS-SEA-0001K9&competition=mls-next-pro&club=MLS-CLU-00003H&statType=general&position=all

==== Disciplinary record ====
| No. | Pos. | Player | MLS Next Pro | | | MLSNP Playoffs | | | Total | | |
| No. | Pos. | Player | Yellow card | (yellow card) (yellow-red card) | Red card | Yellow card | (yellow card) (yellow-red card) | Red card | Yellow card | (yellow card) (yellow-red card) | Red card |
|---|---|---|---|---|---|---|---|---|---|---|---|
| 1 | GK | (Mexico) Anthony Ramos | 0 | 0 | 0 | 0 | 0 | 0 | 0 | 0 | 0 |
| 3 | DF | (El Salvador) Nelson Rodriguez | 1 | 0 | 0 | 0 | 0 | 0 | 1 | 0 | 0 |
| 4 | DF | (United States) Richard Hauth | 0 | 0 | 0 | 0 | 0 | 0 | 0 | 0 | 0 |
| 5 | DF | (Finland) Michael Boamah | 1 | 0 | 0 | 0 | 0 | 0 | 1 | 0 | 0 |
| 6 | DF | (Panama) Reyniel Perdomo | 1 | 0 | 0 | 0 | 0 | 0 | 1 | 0 | 0 |
| 7 | FW | (Hungary) Barnabás Tanyi | 2 | 0 | 1 | 0 | 0 | 0 | 2 | 0 | 1 |
| 8 | MF | (Uganda) Steven Sserwadda | 6 | 0 | 0 | 1 | 0 | 0 | 7 | 0 | 0 |
| 9 | FW | (Brazil) Cauã Paixão | 1 | 0 | 0 | 0 | 0 | 0 | 1 | 0 | 0 |
| 11 | MF | (Panama) Ernesto Gómez | 5 | 0 | 0 | 0 | 0 | 0 | 5 | 0 | 0 |
| 12 | DF | (United States) Lukas Kamrath | 5 | 0 | 0 | 0 | 0 | 0 | 5 | 0 | 0 |
| 13 | MF | (Philippines) Alex Monis | 6 | 0 | 0 | 0 | 0 | 0 | 6 | 0 | 0 |
| 14 | MF | (United States) Dylan Lacy | 5 | 0 | 0 | 0 | 0 | 0 | 5 | 0 | 0 |
| 15 | DF | (United States) Jahvar Stephenson | 7 | 0 | 0 | 0 | 0 | 0 | 7 | 0 | 0 |
| 16 | DF | (United States) Neo Che | 0 | 0 | 0 | 0 | 0 | 0 | 0 | 0 | 0 |
| 17 | MF | (United States) Warren Agostoni | 1 | 0 | 0 | 0 | 0 | 0 | 1 | 0 | 0 |
| 18 | MF | (United States) Sean Petrie | 3 | 0 | 0 | 0 | 0 | 0 | 3 | 0 | 0 |
| 19 | MF | (Uganda) Ibrahim Kasule | 2 | 0 | 0 | 0 | 0 | 0 | 2 | 0 | 0 |
| 20 | DF | (Senegal) Justin Malou | 0 | 0 | 0 | 0 | 0 | 0 | 0 | 0 | 0 |
| 21 | DF | (United States) Rickson van Hees | 1 | 0 | 0 | 0 | 0 | 0 | 1 | 0 | 0 |
| 22 | DF | (Barbados) Andre Applewhaite | 7 | 0 | 0 | 0 | 0 | 0 | 7 | 0 | 0 |
| 23 | GK | (United States) Gunther Rankenburg | 2 | 0 | 0 | 0 | 0 | 0 | 2 | 0 | 0 |
| 24 | MF | (United States) Daniel D’Ippolito | 3 | 0 | 0 | 0 | 0 | 0 | 3 | 0 | 0 |
| 27 | FW | (England) Laurie Goddard | 1 | 0 | 0 | 0 | 0 | 0 | 1 | 0 | 0 |
| 31 | MF | (United States) Robbie Mora | 8 | 1 | 0 | 0 | 0 | 0 | 8 | 1 | 0 |
| 40 | MF | (United States) Giovanni Corsetti | 0 | 0 | 0 | 0 | 0 | 0 | 0 | 0 | 0 |
| 44 | MF | (United States) Jeremy Medranda | 1 | 0 | 0 | 0 | 0 | 0 | 1 | 0 | 0 |
| 46 | MF | (United States) Niko Koloniaris | 1 | 0 | 0 | 0 | 0 | 0 | 1 | 0 | 0 |
| 47 | MF | (United States) Ayden Wolanski | 0 | 0 | 0 | 0 | 0 | 0 | 0 | 0 | 0 |
| 70 | MF | (Haiti) Bryan Destin | 1 | 0 | 0 | 0 | 0 | 0 | 1 | 0 | 0 |
| 77 | MF | (United States) Jamison Ping | 0 | 0 | 0 | 0 | 0 | 0 | 0 | 0 | 0 |
| 99 | MF | (United States) Hivan Kouonang | 0 | 0 | 0 | 0 | 0 | 0 | 0 | 0 | 0 |
| Total | | | 70 | 1 | 1 | 1 | 0 | 0 | 71 | 1 | 1 |

- Last updated: October 25, 2026
- Source: https://www.mlsnextpro.com/clubs/chattanooga-fc/stats/#season=MLS-SEA-0001K9&competition=mls-next-pro&club=MLS-CLU-00003H&statType=general&position=all

== Awards and honors ==
=== MLS NEXT Team of the Matchweek ===
| Matchweek | Reference |
|---|---|
| 29 | |

=== MLS NEXT Pro Goal of the Matchweek ===
| Player | Matchweek | Reference |
|---|---|---|
| (Philippines) Alex Monis | 1 | |

=== MLS NEXT Player of the Matchweek ===
| Player | Matchweek | Reference |
|---|---|---|
| (United States) Dylan Lacy | 20 | |
| (Haiti) Bryan Destin | 25 | |

=== MLS NEXT Coach of the Month ===
| Coach | Month | Reference |
|---|---|---|
| (Jamaica) Shavar Thomas | July | |
| (Jamaica) Shavar Thomas | August | |

=== MLS NEXT Player of the Month ===
| Coach | Month | Reference |
|---|---|---|
| (Hungary) Barnabás Tanyi | August | |
