= 2011 Connecticut Huskies men's soccer team =

Connecticut Huskies men's soccer
2011 season
- Athletic Director: (United States) Jeff Hathaway
- Head Coach: (United States) Ray Reid
- Big East Regular Season: Division: 3rd Overall: 5th
- Big East Tournament: Final
- NCAA Tournament: Quarterfinals
Home colors	Away colors

The 2011 Connecticut Huskies men's soccer team represented the University of Connecticut during the 2011 NCAA Division I men's soccer season. It was the 73rd season the program sponsored a men's varsity soccer program.

The team reached the final of the 2011 Big East Men's Soccer Tournament and the quarterfinals of the 2011 NCAA Division I Men's Soccer Championship, their furthest in the NCAA Tournament since 2007.

== Competitions ==
Home team is listed on the right, and the away team is listed on the left.

=== Exhibitions ===
August 14, 2011 Preseason 1	NJIT	v	Connecticut	Storrs, Connecticut
19:30 EDT				Stadium: Morrone Stadium
Note: Match was cancelled due to inclement weather

August 20, 2011 Preseason 2	Stony Brook	2 – 3	Connecticut	Storrs, Connecticut
19:30 EDT	Crespi 73'; Fernandes 84'	Report	Karppinen 36'; Wasserman 39'; Cascio 58'	Stadium: Morrone Stadium; Referee: Ed Shea

=== Regular season ===
==== Big East standings ====
2011 Big East men's soccer standings
	Conf				Overall		
	W	L	T	Pts.	W	L	T
Blue Division
Marquette (RC)	7	2	0	21	9	8	2
West Virginia	6	3	0	18	10	7	1
Connecticut	5	2	2	17	16	2	2
Georgetown	5	3	1	16	10	5	4
Notre Dame	5	3	1	16	9	5	4
Providence	5	3	1	16	10	7	1
Pittsburgh	2	7	0	6	4	13	1
Seton Hall	1	8	0	3	5	11	2
Red Division
USF (RC)	7	0	2	23	12	3	3
Rutgers	6	1	2	20	9	6	3
St. John's	4	5	0	12	12	6	2
Louisville	3	4	2	11	12	5	2
Villanova	3	5	1	10	8	8	4
DePaul	3	5	1	10	6	11	2
Cincinnati	2	7	0	6	6	11	1
Syracuse	1	7	1	4	3	12	1

Source: Big East
(RC) = Regular season champion; (TC) = Tournament champion
Only applicable when the season is not finished:
(Q) = Qualified for conference tournament, but not to particular round indicated; (E) = Eliminated from conference tournament

==== Results summary ====
Overall								Home						Away					
Pld	W	D	L	GF	GA	GD	Pts	W	D	L	GF	GA	GD	W	D	L	GF	GA	GD
18	14	2	2	0	0	0	44	9	1	0	0	0	0	5	1	2	0	0	0

Last updated: February 9, 2012.
Source: Game reports

==== Results by round ====
Round	1	2	3	4	5	6	7	8	9	10	11	12	13	14	15	16	17	18
Ground	H	H	H	A	N	A	A	H	H	A	H	A	H	H	A	H	H	A
Result	W	W	W	W	W	W	W	W	W	W	W	T	W	W	L	T	W	L

Updated to match(es) played on December 11, 2011. Source: Game reports
A = Away; H = Home; W = Win; L = Loss; T = Tie

==== Game reports ====
August 27, 2011 1	St. Francis Brooklyn	0 – 2	#8 Connecticut	Storrs, Connecticut
19:00 EDT	Johansson (yellow card) 69'; Claesson (yellow card) 83'	Report	Schafer 44' (o.g.); Alvarez 77'	Stadium: Morrone Stadium; Attendance: 2,192; Referee: Ed Shea

September 1, 2011 2	Michigan State	1 – 2	#4 Connecticut	Storrs, Connecticut
19:00 EDT	Bega 52'; Montague (yellow card) 69'	Report	Diouf 15'; Alavarez (yellow card) 66'; Reid (yellow card) 68'; Wasserman 76'; Sanchez (yellow card) 81'	Stadium: Morrone Stadium; Attendance: 3,816; Referee: Bill Dittmar

September 4, 2011 3	#7 California	1 – 4	#4 Connecticut	Storrs, Connecticut
19:00 EDT	Munoz 61'	Report	Diouf 16', 47', 83'; Cascio 62'; Sanchez (yellow card) 83'	Stadium: Morrone Stadium; Attendance: 4,402; Referee: Jeremy Schroeder

September 9, 2011 4	#3 Connecticut	1 – 0	#28 Tulsa	Tulsa, Oklahoma
19:00 EDT	Blake (yellow card) 25'; Diouf 26'	Report	Gonsalves (yellow card) 71'; McIntosh (yellow card) 72'	Stadium: Hurricane Soccer & Track Stadium; Attendance: 587; Referee: Brandon Marrion
Note: Tulsa Tournament

September 11, 2011 5	#3 Connecticut	1 – 0	#18 SMU	Tulsa, Oklahoma
19:00 EDT	Cascio (yellow card) 23'; Snachez (yellow card) 65'; Wasserman 76'	Report	Wright (yellow card) 24'; Abdalla (yellow card) 47'	Stadium: Hurricane Soccer & Track Stadium; Attendance: 587; Referee: Brandon Marrion
Note: Tulsa Tournament

September 16, 2011 6	#1 Connecticut	1 – 0	Boston University	Boston, Massachusetts
19:00 EDT	Matheson 79'; Sanchez (yellow card) 79'	Report	Madzongwe (yellow card) 19'; Souri (yellow card) 41'	Stadium: Nickerson Field; Attendance: 583; Referee: Sean Nally

September 20, 2011 7	#2 Connecticut	2 – 0	#10 Boston College	Newton, Massachusetts
19:00 EDT	Alvarez 51'; Cascio 61'	Report		Stadium: Newton Campus Lacrosse and Soccer Field; Attendance: 677; Referee: Bahij Salman

September 24, 2011 8	St. John's	0 – 2	#2 Connecticut	Storrs, Connecticut
19:00 EDT	Bennett (yellow card) 30'	Report	Alavrez (yellow card) 65'; Matheson 74'; Jean-Baptiste (yellow card) 74'; Diouf 90' (yellow card) 90'	Stadium: Morrone Stadium; Attendance: 5,100; Referee: Kenneth Henriques

September 27, 2011 9	Yale	0 – 1 (a.e.t.)	#1 Connecticut	Storrs, Connecticut
19:30 EDT	Morice (yellow card) 30'; Tica (yellow card) 47'	Report	Blake 109'	Stadium: Morrone Stadium; Attendance: 2,225; Referee: Alex Prus

October 1, 2011 10	#1 Connecticut	1 – 0 (a.e.t.)	#8 Louisville	Louisville, Kentucky
17:30 EDT	Sanchez (yellow card) 44'; Diop 102'	Report	Walker (yellow card) 18'	Stadium: Cardinal Park Soccer and Track Stadium; Attendance: 4,635; Referee: Jeremy Schroeder

October 4, 2011 11	Manhattan	0 – 3	Connecticut	Storrs, Connecticut
18:00 EDT			Alvarez 5'; Karppinen 18'; Diop 42'	Stadium: Morrone Stadium; Attendance: 1,625; Referee: Sean Nally

October 8, 2011 12	#1 Connecticut	0 – 0 (a.e.t.)	Notre Dame	Notre Dame, Indiana
19:00 EDT	Mercado (yellow card) 65'	Report		Stadium: Alumni Stadium; Attendance: 1,943; Referee: Hilario Grajeda

October 12, 2011 13	Providence	1 – 2	#1 Connecticut	Storrs, Connecticut
16:00 EDT	Hodge (yellow card) 29'; Pertuccelli 73'	Report	Diouf 25' 53'	Stadium: Morrone Stadium; Attendance: 2,065; Referee: Tim Debysingh

=== Big East Tournament ===
November 3, 2011 R1	DePaul	0 – 4	Connecticut	Storrs, Connecticut
18:00 EDT	Toth (yellow card) 22' (yellow-red card) 66'; Guustavon (yellow card) 26'; Selvaggi (yellow card) 56'	Report	Alvarez 27' 32'; Diop 37'; Jean-Baptiste 66'	Stadium: Morrone Stadium; Attendance: 1,845; Referee: Bill Dittmar

November 6, 2011 QF	Connecticut	3 – 1	Rutgers	New Brunswick, New Jersey
18:00 EDT	Sanchez (yellow card) 48'; Jean-Baptiste 53'; Cascio 61'; Diop 84'	Report	Eze 51'	Stadium: Yurcak Field; Attendance: 501; Referee: Ed Shea

November 11, 2011 SF	Louisville	0 – 1	Connecticut	Harrison, New Jersey
17:00 EDT		Report	Diop 79'	Stadium: Red Bull Arena; Attendance: 501; Referee: Bill Dittmar

November 13, 2011 F	Connecticut	0 – 1 (a.e.t.)	St. John's	Harrison, New Jersey
12:00 EDT		Report	Bennett 96'	Stadium: Red Bull Arena; Attendance: 2,178; Referee: Alex Prus

=== NCAA Tournament ===
November 20, 2011 R2	#23 Monmouth	1 – 2	#5 Connecticut	Storrs, Connecticut
13:00 EDT	Jeffery 26'; Vazquez (yellow card) 50'; Schmid (yellow card) 60'	Report	Diouf 39', 50' (pen.)	Stadium: Morrone Stadium; Attendance: 3,979; Referee: Bahij Salman

November 27, 2011 R3	#24 James Madison	0 – 3	#5 Connecticut	Storrs, Connecticut
13:00 EDT	Manrau (yellow card) 63'; Barden (yellow card) 78'	Report	Alvarez 19'; Diouf 63'; Cascio 65'	Stadium: Morrone Stadium; Attendance: 4,983; Referee: Peter Dhima

November 30, 2011 QF	#14 Charlotte	1 – 1 (a.e.t.) (4 – 2 p)	#5 Connecticut	Storrs, Connecticut
13:00 EDT	Gentile 85'	Report	Cascio 82'	Stadium: Morrone Stadium; Attendance: 5,100; Referee: Alex Prus
	Penalties
	Gibson (penalty scored); James (penalty missed); Smith (penalty scored); Cowles (penalty scored); Rodriguez (penalty scored)		Diouf (penalty missed); Mercado (penalty missed); Alvarez (penalty scored); Bradley (penalty scored)

== Statistics ==
=== Appearances and goals ===
No.	Pos	Nat	Player	Total		Regular season		Big East Tournament		NCAA Tournament	
No.	Pos	Nat	Player	Apps	Goals	Apps	Goals	Apps	Goals	Apps	Goals
0	GK	(United States) USA	Jacob Wagmeister	1	0	0+0	0	0+1	0	0+0	0
1	GK	(United States) USA	Lionel Brown	0	0	0+0	0	0+0	0	0+0	0
2	MF	(United States) USA	Shane Hudson	0	0	0+0	0	0+0	0	0+0	0
3	DF	(United States) USA	Michael Mercado	4	0	0+0	0	4+0	0	0+0	0
4	DF	(Jamaica) JAM	Nickardo Blake	4	0	0+0	0	4+0	0	0+0	0
5	DF	(Haiti) HAI	Andrew Jean-Baptiste	4	2	0+0	0	4+0	2	0+0	0
6	MF	(Finland) FIN	Juho Karppinen	1	0	0+0	0	0+1	0	0+0	0
7	MF	(Trinidad and Tobago) TRI	Qian Grosvenor	0	0	0+0	0	0+0	0	0+0	0
8	FW	(Canada) CAN	Allando Matheson	4	0	0+0	0	3+1	0	0+0	0
9	FW	(Senegal) SEN	Stephane Diop	4	3	0+0	0	4+0	3	0+0	0
00	GK	(United States) USA	Greg O'Brien	0	0	0+0	0	0+0	0	0+0	0
10	FW	(United States) USA	Carlos Alvarez	3	2	0+0	0	3+0	2	0+0	0
11	DF	(Canada) CAN	Flo Liu	3	0	0+0	0	0+3	0	0+0	0
12	DF	(Canada) CAN	Jonathan Goodridge	1	0	0+0	0	0+1	0	0+0	0
13	MF	(United States) USA	Sean Weir	4	0	0+0	0	3+1	0	0+0	0
14	MF	(United States) USA	Tony Cascio	4	1	0+0	0	1+3	1	0+0	0
15	DF	(United States) USA	Chris O'Brien	1	0	0+0	0	0+1	0	0+0	0
16	FW	(United States) USA	Tyler Leeman	1	0	0+0	0	0+1	0	0+0	0
17	DF	(United States) USA	Will Noiset	0	0	0+0	0	0+0	0	0+0	0
18	GK	(Jamaica) JAM	Andre Blake	4	0	0+0	0	4+0	0	0+0	0
19	DF	(United States) USA	Thomas Palmer	1	0	0+0	0	0+1	0	0+0	0
20	MF	(United States) USA	Colin Bradley	4	0	0+0	0	4+0	0	0+0	0
22	MF	(United States) USA	Max Wasserman	2	0	0+0	0	1+1	0	0+0	0
23	FW	(Senegal) SEN	Mamadou Diouf	4	0	0+0	0	4+0	0	0+0	0
26	GK	(United States) USA	Stefan Berkeley	0	0	0+0	0	0+0	0	0+0	0
27	MF	(United States) USA	Jake Bourgault	1	0	0+0	0	0+1	0	0+0	0
28	DF	(United States) USA	Istvan Kanyo	0	0	0+0	0	0+0	0	0+0	0
44	MF	(United States) USA	Jossimar Sanchez	3	0	0+0	0	3+0	0	0+0	0

Updated to match played February 9, 2012
Source: Connecticut Huskies

=== Goalkeeper stats ===
No.	Nat.	Player	Total			Regular season			Big East Tournament			NCAA Tournament		
No.	Nat.	Player	MIN	GA	GAA	MIN	GA	GAA	MIN	GA	GAA	MIN	GA	GAA
0	(United States)	Jacob Wagmeister	0	0	0.00	0	0	0	8	0	0.00	0	0	0
1	(United States)	Lionel Brown	0	0	0.00	0	0	0	0	0	0.00	0	0	0
00	(United States)	Greg O'Brien	0	0	0.00	0	0	0	0	0	0.00	0	0	0
18	(Jamaica)	Andre Blake	2336	10	0.39	1770	8	0.44	276	1	0.25	290	2	0.67
24	(United States)	Stefan Berkeley	0	0	0.00	0	0	0.00	0	0	0.00	0	0	0.00
TOTALS			2344	10	0.39	1770	8	0.44	276	1	0.25	290	2	0.67

Updated to match played February 9, 2012
Source: Connecticut Huskies

== See also ==
- Connecticut Huskies
- Connecticut Huskies men's soccer
- 2011 in American soccer
- 2011 NCAA Division I men's soccer season
