= 2000 Connecticut Huskies men's soccer team =

Connecticut Huskies
2000 season
- Head Coach: Ray Reid
- Stadium: Morrone Stadium
- NCAA: 20–3–2
- Big East: 8–1–2
- NCAA Tournament: Champions

2000 Big East men's soccer standings
	Conf.					Overall
Team	W		L		T	W		L		T
No. 1 Connecticut $	8	–	1	–	2	20	–	3	–	2
No. 11 St. John’s	8	–	2	–	1	14	–	5	–	2
Boston College	7	–	3	–	1	12	–	7	–	1
Pittsburgh	7	–	4	–	0	13	–	5	–	0
Seton Hall	6	–	5	–	0	13	–	7	–	0
Georgetown	5	–	5	–	1	9	–	8	–	1
Rutgers	5	–	5	–	1	10	–	9	–	1
Syracuse	4	–	5	–	2	8	–	9	–	2
Notre Dame	4	–	7	–	0	7	–	8	–	2
Providence	3	–	7	–	1	4	–	13	–	1
Villanova	2	–	7	–	2	6	–	9	–	2
West Virginia	1	–	9	–	1	4	–	13	–	1
$ – Conference champion; As of December 11, 2000; Rankings from NCSAA

The 2000 Connecticut Huskies men's soccer team represented the University of Connecticut during the 2000 NCAA Division I men's soccer season. The Huskies won their second NCAA title, and third overall when including NSCAA championships. The Huskies were coached by Ray Reid, in his fourth season. They played home games at Morrone Stadium.

== Schedule ==
Date Time, TV	Rank^{#}	Opponent^{#}	Result	Record	Site City, State
Regular season
September 1*		Wake Forest	L 1–2 ^{OT}	0–1	Morrone Stadium • Storrs, CT
September 2*		Duke	W 4–1 ^{OT}	1–1	Morrone Stadium • Storrs, CT
September 10		Seton Hall	W 4–0	2–1 (1–0)	Morrone Stadium • Storrs, CT
September 15*		at Hartwick	W 3–1	3–1	Hartwick, NY
September 16*		vs. New Hampshire	W 1–0	4–1	Hartwick, NY
September 22		at Pittsburgh	W 1–0	5–1 (2–0)	Founders Stadium • Cheswick, PA
September 24		at Notre Dame	W 1–0	6–1 (3–0)	Notre Dame, IN
September 27*		Saint Peter's	W 3–0	7–1	Morrone Stadium • Storrs, CT
September 30		at St. John's	T 0–0 ^{2OT}	7–1–1 (3–0–1)	Queens, NY
October 4		Providence	W 4–1	8–1–1 (4–0–1)	Morrone Stadium • Storrs, CT
October 7*		VCU	W 1–0	9–1–1	Morrone Stadium • Storrs, CT
October 11		at Boston College	T 1–1 ^{2OT}	9–1–2 (4–0–2)	Newton Soccer Complex • Chestnut Hill, MA
October 14		Syracuse	L 0–1	9–2–2 (4–1–2)	Morrone Stadium • Storrs, CT
October 20		Georgetown	W 2–0	10–2–2 (5–1–2)	Morrone Stadium • Storrs, CT
October 22		West Virginia	W 2–0	11–2–2 (6–1–2)	Morrone Stadium • Storrs, CT
October 25		Villanova	W 4–1	12–2–2 (7–1–2)	Morrone Stadium • Storrs, CT
October 28		at Rutgers	W 2–1 ^{OT}	13–2–2 (8–1–2)	Yurcak Field • Piscataway, NJ
October 31*		Hartford	W 1–0	14–2–2	Morrone Stadium • Storrs, CT
Big East Tournament
November 5		Syracuse	W 2–0	15–2–2	Morrone Stadium • Storrs, CT
November 10		vs. Seton Hall	L 2–3 ^{OT}	15–3–2	
NCAA Tournament
November 19*		Dartmouth	W 3–0	16–3–2	Morrone Stadium • Storrs, CT
November 26*		at Clemson	W 2–1 ^{OT}	17–3–2	Riggs Field • Clemson, SC
December 3*		Brown	W 1–0	18–3–2	Morrone Stadium • Storrs, CT
December 8*		vs. SMU	W 2–0	19–3–2	Ericsson Stadium • Charlotte, NC
December 10*		vs. Creighton	W 2–0	20–3–2	Ericcson Stadium • Charlotte, NC (11,421)
*Non-conference game. ^{#}Rankings from United Soccer Coaches. (#) Tournament seedings in parentheses.
