= 2011 Big East Conference men's soccer tournament =

Tournament details
- Country: United States
- Teams: 12

Final positions
- Champions: St. John's
- Runners-up: Connecticut

The 2011 Big East Conference men's soccer tournament was the 2011 edition of the tournament, which determined the men's college soccer champion of the Big East Conference, as well as the conference's automatic berth into the 2011 NCAA Division I Men's Soccer Championship. The tournament began on November 3, 2011 and concluded with the Big East championship on November 13, 2011. The championship, along with the semifinal fixtures, was played at soccer-specific stadium Red Bull Arena in Harrison, New Jersey.

== Qualification ==
2011 Big East men's soccer standings
	Conf				Overall		
	W	L	T	Pts.	W	L	T
Blue Division
Marquette (RC)	7	2	0	21	9	8	2
West Virginia	6	3	0	18	10	7	1
Connecticut	5	2	2	17	16	2	2
Georgetown	5	3	1	16	10	5	4
Notre Dame	5	3	1	16	9	5	4
Providence	5	3	1	16	10	7	1
Pittsburgh	2	7	0	6	4	13	1
Seton Hall	1	8	0	3	5	11	2
Red Division
USF (RC)	7	0	2	23	12	3	3
Rutgers	6	1	2	20	9	6	3
St. John's	4	5	0	12	12	6	2
Louisville	3	4	2	11	12	5	2
Villanova	3	5	1	10	8	8	4
DePaul	3	5	1	10	6	11	2
Cincinnati	2	7	0	6	6	11	1
Syracuse	1	7	1	4	3	12	1

Source: Big East
(RC) = Regular season champion; (TC) = Tournament champion
Only applicable when the season is not finished:
(Q) = Qualified for conference tournament, but not to particular round indicated; (E) = Eliminated from conference tournament

== Bracket ==
First Round
R6	DePaul	0
B3	Connecticut	4
B5	Providence	0
R4	Louisville	5
B6	Georgetown	1
R3	St. John's	2
R5	Villanova	1
B4	Notre Dame	0

Quarterfinals
R2	Rutgers	1
B3	Connecticut	3
B1	Marquette	0
R4	Louisville	1
B2	West Virginia	0
R3	St. John's	2
R1	USF	0
R5	Villanova	1

Semifinals
B3	Connecticut	1
R4	Louisville	0
R3	St. John's	2
R5	Villanova	0

Final
B3	Connecticut	0
R3	St. John's	1

== Schedule ==
The tournament will begin on November 2, 2011

=== First round ===
The home team is listed on the right, the away team is listed on the left.

November 3, 2011
6:00 PM EDT

DePaul	0–4	Connecticut
	Report	Alvarez 27', 32'; Diop 38'; Jean-Baptiste 67'

Morrone Stadium
Mansfield, Connecticut
Attendance: 1,845
Referee: Kenneth Henriques

November 3, 2011
7:00 PM EDT

Georgetown	1–2	St. John's
Christianson 38'	Report	Mulligan 8'; Parker 50'

Belson Stadium
Queens, New York
Attendance: 1,108
Referee: Hayden Cust

November 3, 2011
7:00 PM EDT

Providence	0–5	Louisville
	Report	Obbey 17'; Rolfe 22', 47', 52'; Hamilton 36'

Cardinal Park Soccer and Track Stadium
Louisville, Kentucky
Attendance: 453
Referee: Jeremy Schroeder

November 3, 2011
7:00 PM EDT

Villanova	1–0	Notre Dame
Dennis 35'	Report

Alumni Stadium
Notre Dame, Indiana
Attendance: 194
Referee: Ed Braun

=== Quarterfinals ===
November 6, 2011
1:00 PM CST

Louisville	1–0	Marquette
Rolfe 23'	Report

Valley Fields
Milwaukee, Wisconsin
Attendance: 623
Referee: Jeremy Schroeder

November 6, 2011
1:00 PM EST

Connecticut	3–1	Rutgers
Jean-Baptiste 53'; Cascio 61'; Diop 84'	Report	Eze 52'

Yurcak Field
New Brunswick, New Jersey
Attendance: 501
Referee: Ed Shea

November 6, 2011
1:00 PM EST

Villanova	1–0	USF
Soroka 3'	Report

Corbett Soccer Stadium
Tampa, Florida
Attendance: 1,589
Referee: Bill Dittmar

November 6, 2011
3:30 PM EST

St. John's	2–0	West Virginia
Hines 60'; Vargas 90'	Report

Dick Dlesk Soccer Stadium
Morgantown, West Virginia
Attendance: 1,013
Referee: Tony DeLois

=== Semifinals ===
November 11, 2011
5:00 PM

Louisville	0–1	Connecticut
	Report	Diop 79'

Red Bull Arena
Harrison, NJ

November 11, 2011
7:30 PM

Villanova	0–2	St. John's
	Report	Hines 77'; Ligety 82'

Red Bull Arena
Harrison, NJ

=== Championship ===
November 13, 2011
12:00 PM

Connecticut	0–1 (a.e.t.)	St. John's
	Report	Bennett 96'

Red Bull Arena
Harrison, NJ
Attendance: 2,178
Referee: Alex Prus

== See also ==
- Big East Conference
- 2011 Big East Conference men's soccer season
- 2011 in American soccer
- 2011 NCAA Division I Men's Soccer Championship
- 2011 NCAA Division I men's soccer season
