= John Squire (disambiguation) =

John Squire (born 1962) is an English musician.

John Squire may also refer to:

- John Squire (British Army officer) (1780–1812) of the Royal Engineers
- J. C. Squire (1882–1958), British poet and historian
- Stanley John Squire (1915–1998), politician in British Columbia, Canada
- John M. Squire (1945–2021), British biophysicist

== See also ==
- John Squires
- Squire (surname)
