= John Squires =

John Squires may refer to:

== Sportspeople ==
- John H. Squires (1882–1934), American college football coach, agriculturist, chemical engineer, and financier
- John Young Squires (1912–2006), American soccer coach
- Johnny Squires, Republic of Ireland international footballer

== Others ==
- John A. Squires, American lawyer and senior government official
- John C. Squires (1925–1944), United States Army soldier and Medal of Honor recipient
- John Squires, American data-storage engineer and co-founder of CoData

== See also ==
- John Squire (disambiguation)
- Squires (surname)
