= Ray Reid =

American college soccer coach (born 1960)

Biographical details
- Born: May 8, 1960 (age 66); Brentwood, New York
- Education: Southern Connecticut State University

Playing career
- 1979: Suffolk Community College
- 1980–1982: Southern Connecticut

Coaching career (HC unless noted)
- 1983–1988: Southern Connecticut (asst.)
- 1989–1996: Southern Connecticut
- 1997–2021: UConn

Head coaching record
- Overall: 394–97–61 (.769)

Accomplishments and honors

Championships
- 1x NCAA Division I Men's Soccer Championship (2000); 3x NCAA Division II Men's Soccer Championship (1990, 1992, 1995); 8x Big East Regular Season Champions (1998–2001, 2005, 2007, 2009, 2012); 4x Big East Tournament Champions (1999, 2004, 2005, 2007)

Awards
- 4x NSCAA Coach of the Year (1990, 1992, 1994, 2000)

Raymond Michael "Ray" Reid (born May 8, 1960) is an American retired college soccer coach. He was head coach at the University of Connecticut Huskies men's soccer team for 24 years. He has led UConn to one NCAA Division I national championship, eight Big East regular season championships and four Big East tournament championships. Before coming to UConn, he was the head coach at Southern Connecticut State University, leading the team to three NCAA Division II national championships in eight seasons. Reid leads all coaches in the nation in winning percentage (.769) and has won four NSCAA Coach of the Year awards. He is regarded as one of the greatest college coaches in Connecticut soccer history.

== Early years ==
Reid was born and raised in Brentwood, New York. He graduated from Southern Connecticut in 1982 with a degree in economics.

== Playing career ==
Reid was a soccer standout at Brentwood High School, where he received academic honors in addition to those on the field. He spent his first year of NCAA eligibility at Suffolk Community College, receiving all-region honors. He transferred to Southern Connecticut for his remaining three years of eligibility. He was a captain on the team for his junior and senior years and played in three NCAA Division II national championship semifinals while with the Owls.

== Early coaching years ==
After graduating from Southern Connecticut in 1982, Reid was offered an assistant coaching position by then-head coach Bob Dikranian. He spent the next six seasons as an assistant coach at the school, helping the team win its first national championship in 1987.

== Head coach at Southern Connecticut ==
During Reid's eight-year tenure at Southern Connecticut, the Owls only missed the NCAA tournament once (1991) and advanced to the Division II College Cup six times (1990, 1992, 1993, 1994, 1995, 1996), winning national championships in three of those years (1990, 1993, 1995).

== Head coach at UConn ==
UConn initially pursued Reid for the coaching job after long-time head coach Joe Morrone suffered several sub-par seasons, failing to reach the NCAA tournament for seven straight years. After several years of turning down offers from other Division I programs, Reid decided to take the job, which some of those close to him described as "his dream job". He has coached at UConn since 1997, and has obtained a 248–80–46 (.725) mark during his 17 seasons in Storrs. In just his third season, Reid took the Huskies to the College Cup semifinals, falling just short of the national championship game. But Reid brought back a determined team in 2000, winning his first and only Division I national championship in a 2–0 victory against Creighton. His teams have made sixteen straight NCAA tournament appearances, including three straight national quarterfinal appearances since 2011.

== Personal life ==
Reid married Valarie Casares in 2008. Reid has two daughters, Cate and Dannielle, from his previous marriage to Sondra Reid.

Reid has worked closely with current UConn associate head coach John Deeley for more than 30 years, who played against Reid in high school and later with him at Southern Connecticut. The pair appeared in two NCAA Division II national championship semifinals while with the Owls. Upon Reid's promotion to head coach at Southern Connecticut in 1989, he hired Deeley as an assistant, where they worked together for eight years. Reid brought Deeley with him when he came to UConn in 1997.

== Head coaching record ==
Record table
Season	Team	Overall	Conference	Standing	Postseason
Southern Connecticut (Division II) (1989–1996)
1989	Southern Connecticut	14–7–1			NCAA Regionals
1990	Southern Connecticut	22–0–1			NCAA Champions
1991	Southern Connecticut	14–4–3			
1992	Southern Connecticut	21–2–1			NCAA Champions
1993	Southern Connecticut	17–2–3			NCAA Runner-up
1994	Southern Connecticut	17–0–4			NCAA Semifinals
1995	Southern Connecticut	21–1–1			NCAA Champions
1996	Southern Connecticut	20–1–1			NCAA Semifinals
Southern Connecticut – Division II:		146–17–15 (.862)			
UConn (Big East Conference) (1997–2013)
1997	Connecticut	11–7–2	5–6–0	7th	
1998	Connecticut	17–4–0	9–2–0	1st	NCAA First Round
1999	Connecticut	19–5–0	9–2–0	T-1st	NCAA Semifinals
2000	Connecticut	20–3–2	8–1–2	1st	NCAA Champions
2001	Connecticut	15–5–2	9–1–0	1st	NCAA Second Round
2002	Connecticut	16–6–1	7–3–0	3rd	NCAA Quarterfinals
2003	Connecticut	9–8–4	5–3–2	6th	NCAA Second Round
2004	Connecticut	12–8–3	5–4–1	T–5th	NCAA Second Round
2005	Connecticut	16–3–2	7–3–1	T-1st	NCAA Third Round
2006	Connecticut	10–7–2	8–2–1	2nd	NCAA First Round
2007	Connecticut	20–3–1	8–2–1	T-1st	NCAA Quarterfinals
2008	Connecticut	11–5–6	6–3–2	3rd	NCAA Third Round
2009	Connecticut	11–4–4	8–2–1	T-1st	NCAA First Round
2010	Connecticut	12–2–6	5–1–3	T-4th	NCAA Second Round
2011	Connecticut	19–3–3	5–2–2	5th	NCAA Quarterfinals
2012	Connecticut	17–4–1	6–2–0	T-1st	NCAA Quarterfinals
Connecticut – Big East:		235–77–39 (.725)	110–39–16 (.715)		
UConn (American Athletic Conference) (2013–present)
2013	Connecticut	12–3–8	4–0–4	2nd	NCAA Quarterfinals
2014	Connecticut	10–6–3	6–1–1	1st	
2015	Connecticut	10–6–6	3–3–2	3rd	NCAA Second Round
2016	Connecticut	11–7–1	3–3–1	3rd	
2017	Connecticut	8–8–2	4–3–0	3rd	
2018	Connecticut	12–6–2	3–2–2	4th	NCAA Second Round
Connecticut – American Athletic Conference:		63–36–22 (.612)	23–12–10 (.622)		
Total:		445–130–75 (.742)			
National champion Postseason invitational champion Conference regular season champion Conference regular season and conference tournament champion Division regular season champion Division regular season and conference tournament champion Conference tournament champion
