= Alex Monis =

Filipino-American footballer (born 2003)

Personal information
- Full name: Alex James Weathers Monis
- Date of birth: March 20, 2003 (age 23)
- Place of birth: Downers Grove, Illinois, United States
- Height: 5 ft 7 in (1.71 m)
- Position: Winger

Team information
- Current team: CT United

Youth career
- 2015–2016: Chicago Fire
- 2016–2017: Chicago United
- 2018–2020: Chicago Fire

Senior career*
| Years | Team | Apps | (Gls) |
| 2020–2023 | Chicago Fire | 4 | (1) |
| 2020–2021 | → Forward Madison (loan) | 7 | (0) |
| 2022–2023 | Chicago Fire II | 40 | (11) |
| 2023 | → Rio Grande Valley FC (loan) | 6 | (1) |
| 2024–2025 | New England Revolution II | 40 | (9) |
| 2025 | New England Revolution | 1 | (0) |
| 2026– | CT United | 28 | (8) |

International career^{‡}
| 2018–2019 | United States U16 | 8 | (3) |
| 2025 | Philippines U22 | 4 | (1) |
| 2025– | Philippines U23 | 3 | (0) |
| 2024– | Philippines | 16 | (0) |
- * Club domestic league appearances and goals as of 20 September 2026 ‡ National team caps and goals as of 18 December 2025

Alex James Weathers Monis (born March 20, 2003) is a Filipino professional footballer who plays as a winger for MLS Next Pro club CT United, which he captains. Born in the United States, Monis plays for the Philippines national team.

== Club career ==
Born in Downers Grove, Illinois, Monis began his career with the Chicago Fire youth academy before joining Chicago United. He then returned to the Chicago Fire in 2018.

=== Chicago Fire ===
On March 11, 2020, Monis signed a homegrown player deal with Major League Soccer club Chicago Fire.

==== Forward Madison (loan) ====
On July 24, 2020, Monis was loaned to USL League One club Forward Madison for the remainder of the 2020 season. He made his professional debut for the club a day later on July 25 against North Texas SC, coming on as a 74th minute in a 2–1 defeat.

=== New England Revolution II ===
Monis signed with MLS Next Pro side New England Revolution II on January 8, 2024. New England declined his contract option following their 2025 season.

== International career ==
=== USA youth ===
On May 15, 2019, Monis made his United States debut for the under-16s in a friendly against the Czech Republic.

=== Philippines ===
In May 2024, Monis was included in the Philippines 28-man squad for the 2026 FIFA World Cup qualifying matches against Vietnam and Indonesia. Monis made his debut on 6 June 2024 against the former at the Mỹ Đình National Stadium. He started and played 70 minutes as Vietnam won 3–2.

== Career statistics ==
As of match played June 18, 2026

Appearances and goals by club, season and competition
| Club | Season | League | | | National cup (Note: U.S. Open Cup) | | Other | | Total | |
| Club | Season | Division | Apps | Goals | Apps | Goals | Apps | Goals | Apps | Goals |
|---|---|---|---|---|---|---|---|---|---|---|
| Chicago Fire | 2020 | Major League Soccer | 0 | 0 | — | — | — | — | 0 | 0 |
| Chicago Fire | 2021 | Major League Soccer | 1 | 0 | — | — | — | — | 1 | 0 |
| Chicago Fire | 2022 | Major League Soccer | 1 | 1 | — | — | — | — | 1 | 1 |
| Chicago Fire | 2023 | Major League Soccer | 1 | 0 | 1 | 0 | — | — | 2 | 0 |
| Forward Madison (loan) | 2020 | USL League One | 6 | 0 | — | — | — | — | 6 | 0 |
| Forward Madison (loan) | 2021 | USL League One | 1 | 0 | — | — | — | — | 1 | 0 |
| Chicago Fire II | 2022 | MLS Next Pro | 21 | 5 | — | — | — | — | 21 | 5 |
| Chicago Fire II | 2023 | MLS Next Pro | 19 | 6 | — | — | — | — | 19 | 6 |
| Rio Grande Valley FC | 2023 | USL Championship | 6 | 1 | — | — | — | — | 6 | 1 |
| New England Revolution II | 2024 | MLS Next Pro | 24 | 8 | — | — | — | — | 24 | 8 |
| New England Revolution II | 2025 | MLS Next Pro | 16 | 1 | — | — | — | — | 16 | 1 |
| New England Revolution | 2025 | MLS Next Pro | — | — | 1 | 0 | — | — | 1 | 0 |
| CT United | 2026 | MLS Next Pro | 12 | 4 | — | — | — | — | 12 | 4 |
| Career total | | | 108 | 26 | 2 | 0 | 0 | 0 | 110 | 26 |
