= John Young Squires =

American soccer coach

John Young Squires (May 3, 1912 – July 25, 2006) was an American men's soccer coach. He coached the Connecticut Huskies between 1937 and 1941 and from 1946 to 1968. The 1943–1945 seasons were canceled due to World War II so the only season during that time that the Huskies played without Squires was 1942, when they were coached by Carl Fischer. Joe Morrone took over for Squires beginning in 1969.

He was born May 3, 1912, in Norwalk, Connecticut, and often participated in the Norwalk YMCA.

In 1934, Squires got a scholarship at the University of Geneva in Geneva, Switzerland. He continued to study physical education there. He earned a master's degree at the University of Connecticut and later a doctorate degree in PE at Springfield College. At Springfield, he was the Professor of Physical Education, and taught soccer and swimming. He organized the first National Collegiate Athletic Association Soccer Championship in 1959. He died at the age of 94 on July 25, 2006.
