= Shavar Thomas =

Jamaican footballer (born 1981)

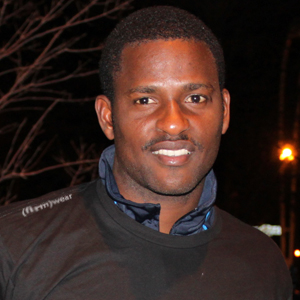

Personal information
- Full name: Shavar Thomas
- Date of birth: 29 January 1981 (age 45)
- Place of birth: Kingston, Jamaica
- Height: 6 ft 1 in (1.85 m)
- Position: Defender

Youth career
- 1997–1999: Hotchkiss Bearcats
- 1999–2001: Hazard United

College career
| Years | Team | Apps | (Gls) |
| 2001–2002 | Connecticut Huskies | | |

Senior career*
| Years | Team | Apps | (Gls) |
| 2003 | Dallas Burn | 15 | (1) |
| 2004–2006 | Kansas City Wizards | 76 | (2) |
| 2007 | Los Angeles Galaxy | 0 | (0) |
| 2007–2009 | Chivas USA | 63 | (0) |
| 2010 | Philadelphia Union | 1 | (0) |
| 2010–2011 | Sporting Kansas City | 19 | (0) |
| 2012 | Montreal Impact | 15 | (0) |
| 2013 | Fort Lauderdale Strikers | 9 | (0) |
| Total | | 198 | (3) |

International career^{‡}
| 1999–2001 | Jamaica U20 | 10 | (0) |
| 2003–2004 | Jamaica U23 | 5 | (0) |
| 1999–2012 | Jamaica | 53 | (0) |

Managerial career
- 2017–2019: Portmore United
- 2019–2022: Turks and Caicos
- 2022–2025: FC Cincinnati 2 (assistant)
- 2026–: Connecticut United
- * Club domestic league appearances and goals as of 9 March 2022 ‡ National team caps and goals as of 1 November 2026

Shavar Thomas (born 29 January 1981) is a retired Jamaican footballer and current coach of Connecticut United of MLS Next Pro.

== Career ==
=== Amateur and college ===
Thomas played as a youth for Hazard United in Jamaica and at The Hotchkiss School in Lakeville, Connecticut. He played college soccer at the University of Connecticut. He played two seasons, 2001 and 2002, and was named an NSCAA second team All-American his second year.

=== Professional ===
After that year, Thomas entered the 2003 MLS SuperDraft, where he was selected 10th overall by Dallas Burn. Thomas struggled in his first year, often appearing raw, but finished the season with 14 starts and 1252 minutes for the Burn. In the offseason, Thomas was traded to Kansas City Wizards in exchange for Eric Quill and Carey Talley. In his second year, Thomas established himself as a solid defender, playing center back for one of the league's best defensive teams. He finished the season with 1880 minutes in 22 starts. Thomas continued as a starter in 2005 and 2006. On 23 March 2007, Thomas was traded to Los Angeles Galaxy for a conditional second-round draft pick. On 3 May 2007, he was traded to Chivas USA for a second-round pick in the 2009 MLS SuperDraft.

Thomas was selected by Philadelphia Union in the 2009 MLS Expansion Draft on 25 November 2009. He was traded to his former club Kansas City Wizards on 30 June 2010 in exchange for two MLS SuperDraft picks and allocation money.

Thomas remained with Kansas City through the 2011 season. At season's end, the club declined his 2012 contract option and he entered the 2011 MLS Re-Entry Draft. Thomas was not selected in the draft and became a free agent.

Thomas signed with new MLS franchise Montreal Impact on 20 January 2012. On 2 November 2012 Montreal announced that Thomas would not be returning to the club in 2013. He entered the 2012 MLS Re-Entry Draft and became a free agent after going undrafted in both rounds of the draft.

In 2013, Thomas was invited to D.C. United's training camp as a trialist, but wasn't offered a contract. It was announced on 11 March 2013 that Thomas signed with the Fort Lauderdale Strikers for the NASL's Spring season.

After leaving Fort Lauderdale, Thomas went on trial with Brunei DPMM of the S.League in November 2013.

=== International ===
Thomas appeared for the Jamaican U-20's in the 2001 FIFA World Youth Championship in Argentina and looked poised to break into a major role with the Jamaica national team, while captaining the 2004 Olympic squad. He currently has 49 caps, and has represented the team at every level.

He captained the Jamaica national team to the 2010 Caribbean Championship in Martinique.

== Management ==
=== Portmore United ===
In August 2017, Thomas was named coach of Portmore United F.C. of the Red Stripe Premier League. Thomas's first season leading Portmore was a great success finishing first in the table, 15 points clear of second place Arnett Gardens. After two successive runners-up finishes in prior seasons, Thomas's Portmore won the final, beating Waterhouse F.C. in penalties, earning the club's sixth title overall, and first since 2012.

Thomas's Portmore saw continued success during the 2018–19 season, finishing top of the table and winning the final for the club's seventh title and Thomas's second.

The 2017-18 title earned Portmore qualification to the 2019 Caribbean Club Championship. Going undefeated through the tournament, Thomas's Portmore secured the 2019 Caribbean Club Championship, earning the club's second title from the competition, and first since 2005.

=== Turks and Caicos ===
Thomas left Portmore at the conclusion of the 2019 season of competition to join coaching staff in Turks and Caicos Islands Football Association.

=== FC Cincinnati 2 ===
In 2022, Thomas joined FC Cincinnati 2 as an assistant coach.

=== Connecticut United ===
On December 23, 2025, Thomas joined Connecticut United as a coach for the team.

== Achievements ==
=== Club ===
==== CD Chivas USA ====
- MLS Supporters' Shield
  - Runners-up (1): 2007
- MLS Western Conference
  - Winners (Regular Season) (1): 2007

==== Kansas City Wizards/Sporting KC ====
- Lamar Hunt U.S. Open Cup (1): 2004
- Major League Soccer Western Conference Championship (1): 2004

=== Jamaica ===
- Caribbean Cup Winner (2): 2008, 2010

=== Managerial ===
==== Portmore United ====
- National Premier League Winner (2): 2017–18, 2018–19
- Caribbean Club Championship Winner (1): 2019

Sporting positions
| Preceded by Ricardo Gardner | Jamaica national football team captain 2011– | Succeeded by Incumbent |
