= Michael Boamah =

American-Finnish footballer (born 2003)

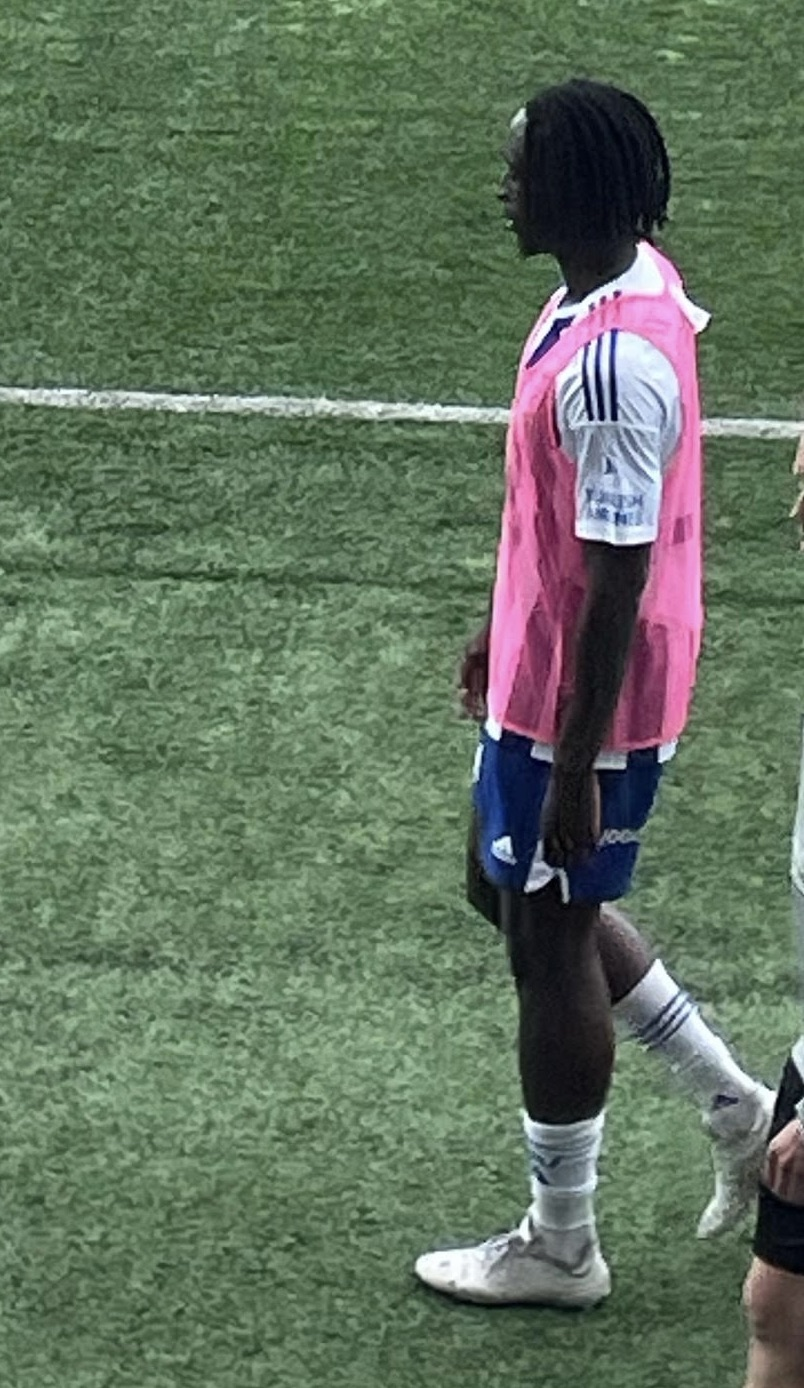
- Boamah with HJK in 2024

Personal information
- Date of birth: 16 April 2003 (age 23)
- Place of birth: New York City, New York, U.S.
- Height: 1.90 m (6 ft 3 in)
- Position: Centre back

Team information
- Current team: Connecticut United

Youth career
- –2017: IPS
- 2017–2019: PEPO
- 2019–2020: HJK

Senior career*
Years	Team	Apps	(Gls)
2021–2023	Klubi 04	39	(1)
2021	→ VJS (loan)	12	(3)
2023–2026	HJK	18	(1)
2025–2026	→ Haka (loan)	7	(0)
2026–	Connecticut United	10	(0)

International career
2018	Finland U16	2	(0)
- * Club domestic league appearances and goals as of 1 August 2026

Michael Boamah (born 16 April 2003) is a Finnish professional footballer who plays as a centre back for MLS Next Pro club Connecticut United, on loan from HJK. Born in the United States, he has represented Finland at youth level.

== Early career ==
Boamah played in the youth sector of Imatran Palloseura in Imatra since he was nine years old. He joined the HJK Helsinki youth academy in 2019.

== Club career ==
On 18 September 2020, Boamah signed his first professional contract with HJK on a two-year deal. He started his senior career in 2021, when he was loaned out to Vantaan Jalkapalloseura in the third-tier Kakkonen. Since the start of 2022, he played with HJK's reserve team Klubi 04. On 9 December 2022, his contract was extended until the end of 2024 with a one-year option.

Boamah debuted for HJK first team in the 2023 Finnish Cup against Honka. During the 2023 season, he played mostly with Klubi 04, until in Autumn he suffered from severe myocarditis and was out for six months.

On 22 May 2024, he made his Veikkausliiga debut in a match against Gnistan. On 1 July 2024, Boamah extended his contract with HJK until the end of 2026, with an option for 2027.

== International career ==
Boaham has played two friendly games for Finland U16 national team against Sweden in August 2018.

== Personal life ==
Boamah was born in the United States to a Christian family to a Ghanaian mother and an American father. He was raised in The Bronx, New York, and in Philadelphia until his parents separated and he moved to Accra, Ghana, with his mother. At the age of eight, they relocated to Lappeenranta, Finland. Boamah holds a dual Finnish-American citizenship, and speaks Finnish, English and Twi.

== Career statistics ==
As of 25 August 2025

Appearances and goals by club, season and competition
Club	Season	League			National cup (Note: Includes Suomen Cup)		League cup (Note: Includes Finnish League Cup)		Europe		Total	
Club	Season	Division	Apps	Goals	Apps	Goals	Apps	Goals	Apps	Goals	Apps	Goals
Klubi 04	2021	Ykkönen	0	0	–		–		–		0	0
Klubi 04	2022	Kakkonen	20	0	3	0	–		–		23	0
Klubi 04	2023	Kakkonen	16	1	1	0	–		–		17	1
Klubi 04	2024	Ykkönen	2	0	–		–		–		2	0
Klubi 04	2025	Ykkösliiga	1	0	–		–		–		1	0
Klubi 04	Total		39	1	4	0	0	0	0	0	43	1
VJS (loan)	2021	Kakkonen	12	3	–		–		–		12	3
HJK	2023	Veikkausliiga	0	0	1	0	0	0	0	0	1	0
HJK	2024	Veikkausliiga	12	0	2	0	1	0	2 (Note: Appearances in UEFA Champions League)	0	17	0
HJK	2025	Veikkausliiga	6	1	2	0	4	0	1 (Note: Appearances in UEFA Conference League)	0	13	1
HJK	Total		18	1	5	0	5	0	3	0	31	1
Haka (loan)	2025	Veikkausliiga	1	0	–		–		–		1	0
Career total			70	5	9	0	5	0	3	0	87	5
