= Steven Sserwadda =

Ugandan footballer (born 2002)

Personal information
- Date of birth: 28 August 2002 (age 24)
- Place of birth: Kampala, Uganda
- Height: 1.65 m (5 ft 5 in)
- Position: Midfielder

Team information
- Current team: CT United FC (on loan from New York Red Bulls II)

Youth career
- 2015–2018: KCCA

Senior career*
Years	Team	Apps	(Gls)
2018–2021	KCCA	19	(2)
2021–2022	New York Red Bulls II	18	(2)
2022–2023	New York Red Bulls	2	(0)
2024–	New York Red Bulls II	45	(2)
2026–	→ CT United FC (loan)	18	(0)

International career^{‡}
2021–2023	Uganda U20	8	(5)
2021–	Uganda	6	(0)
- * Club domestic league appearances and goals as of 20:31, 15 November 2026 (UTC) ‡ National team caps and goals as of 15 March 2026

Steven Sserwadda (born 28 August 2002) is a Ugandan professional footballer who plays as a midfielder for MLS Next Pro club CT United FC, on loan from New York Red Bulls II.

== Club career ==
=== KCCA ===
Born in Kampala, Sserwadda began his career in the youth setup of local club Kampala Capital City Authority FC in 2015. In 2018, he was promoted to the KCCA first team after rising through the ranks of the youth teams. A few months later he made his first international club appearance in the 2018–19 CAF Confederation Cup in a 2–1 victory against Tanzanian club, Mtibwa Sugar. During the 2018 Uganda Cup semi-finals, Sserwadda scored two goals in a 9–0 victory against Synergy FC. While with the club he won various titles, including one Kagame Interclub Cup, one Uganda Premier League, two Super Cups, and a Super 8 Cup.

=== New York Red Bulls II ===
On 30 September 2021, Sserwadda joined USL Championship side New York Red Bulls II. Sserwadda made his debut for Red Bulls II on October 15, 2021, during a 1–1 draw against Tampa Bay Rowdies. On 31 July 2022, Sserwadda scored his first goal with New York Red Bulls II in a 1–2 loss to New Mexico United. On 9 August 2022, Sserwadda scored the equalizing goal in a 2–1 victory over Atlanta United 2. On 6 February 2024, the New York Red Bulls II announced that they had re-signed Sserwadda to a pro contract

==== New York Red Bulls (loan) ====
On 22 June 2022, the New York Red Bulls announced that they had signed Sserwadda to a short-term loan ahead of their 2022 U.S. Open Cup quarterfinal against New York City FC. Sserwadda made his first team debut for the Red Bulls the same day as an 84th-minute substitution for Luquinhas.

=== New York Red Bulls ===
On 9 July 2022, Sserwadda made a permanent move to the Red Bulls first team roster. He missed the entire 2023 season as result of an MCL injury suffered while playing for his national team.

=== CT United FC ===
On 8 January 2026, Red Bull New York II loaned midfielder Steven Sserwadda to MLS NEXT Pro expansion side Connecticut United FC for the 2026 season. Sserwadda was a part of the club's first starting XI in their history on 1 March 2026.

== International career ==
Sserwadda featured in all six matches for Uganda in the 2021 Africa U-20 Cup of Nations. He scored two goals in the group stage, playing a vital role in their run to the final. He debuted with the Uganda national team in a friendly 1–1 (5–4) penalty shootout win over Tajikistan on 25 March 2022. On 24 March 2023, Sserwadda suffered a torn MCL during an Africa Cup of Nations qualifying game against Tanzania.

== Career statistics ==
As of match played October 24, 2026

Appearances and goals by club, season and competition
Club	Season	League			Playoffs		National cup (Note: Includes Uganda Cup, U.S. Open Cup)		Continental		Total	
Club	Season	Division	Apps	Goals	Apps	Goals	Apps	Goals	Apps	Goals	Apps	Goals
KCCA FC	2018–19	Uganda Premier League	1	1	0	0	3	2	1 (Note: Appearance in CAF Confederation Cup)	0	5	3
KCCA FC	2019–20	Uganda Premier League	9	1	0	0	0	0	1	0	10	1
KCCA FC	2020–21	Uganda Premier League	9	0	0	0	1	0	0	0	10	0
KCCA FC	Total		19	2	0	0	4	2	2	0	25	4
New York Red Bulls II	2021	USL Championship	4	0	0	0	0	0	0	0	4	0
New York Red Bulls II	2022	USL Championship	14	2	0	0	0	0	0	0	14	2
New York Red Bulls II	2023	MLS Next Pro	0	0	0	0	0	0	0	0	0	0
New York Red Bulls II	2024	MLS Next Pro	23	2	0	0	2	0	0	0	25	2
New York Red Bulls II	2025	MLS Next Pro	22	0	0	0	0	0	0	0	22	0
New York Red Bulls II	Total		63	4	0	0	2	0	0	0	65	4
New York Red Bulls	2022	Major League Soccer	2	0	0	0	1	0	0	0	3	0
CT United FC (loan)	2026	MLS Next Pro	18	0	1	0	0	0	0	0	19	0
Career total			102	6	1	0	7	2	2	0	112	8

== Honours ==
KCCA

- Uganda Premier League: 2018–19
- Uganda Cup: 2018

New York Red Bulls II

- MLS Next Pro Cup: 2025
