= Cauã Paixão =

Brazilian footballer (born 2004)

Personal information
- Full name: Cauã Paixão de Souza
- Date of birth: 27 May 2004 (age 22)
- Place of birth: Rio de Janeiro, Brazil
- Height: 1.75 m (5 ft 9 in)
- Position: Forward

Team information
- Current team: Connecticut United

Youth career
- 2018–2023: Vasco da Gama

Senior career*
Years	Team	Apps	(Gls)
2023–2025	Vasco da Gama	4	(1)
2024	→ América de Natal (loan)	7	(0)
2024–2025	→ Polissya Zhytomyr (loan)	16	(1)
2024	→ Polissya-2 Zhytomyr (loan)	1	(0)
2026–	Connecticut United	18	(3)
- * Club domestic league appearances and goals as of 9 August 2026

Cauã Paixão de Souza (born 27 May 2004), known as Paixão or Cauã Paixão, is a Brazilian footballer who plays as a forward for American club Connecticut United.

== Club career ==
Paixão joined the academy of Vasco da Gama in 2018, going on to sign his first professional contract in 2021. He made his professional debut in the 2023 season, getting an assist for Matías Galarza in a 1–1 Campeonato Carioca draw with Audax Rio in his second appearance.

== Career statistics ==
=== Club ===
As of 4 March 2023.

Appearances and goals by club, season and competition
Club	Season	League			State League		Cup		Continental		Other		Total	
Club	Season	Division	Apps	Goals	Apps	Goals	Apps	Goals	Apps	Goals	Apps	Goals	Apps	Goals
Vasco da Gama	2023	Série A	0	0	2 (Note: Appearances in the Campeonato Carioca)	0	0	0	—		0	0	2	0
Career total			0	0	2	0	0	0	0	0	0	0	2	0
