= CT United FC =

American professional soccer club based in Bridgeport, Connecticut

- Full name: Connecticut United FC
- Founded: January 9, 2024; 2 years ago
- Stadium: Various
- Owner(s): André Swanston; Michelle Swanston
- Manager: Shavar Thomas
- League: MLS Next Pro
- Website: ctunited.com
Home colors	Away colors	Third colors

CT United FC, also known as Connecticut United FC, is an American professional soccer team based in Bridgeport, Connecticut. It plays in MLS Next Pro, the third tier of American soccer.

== History ==
On January 9, 2024, MLS Next Pro awarded an expansion team to a group from the city of Bridgeport, Connecticut. The ownership group, named Connecticut Sports Group, consists of businessman André Swanston and his wife Michelle Swanston.

Originally set to begin play in 2025, the team's debut was delayed to 2026. The team played their first match on March 1, away to FC Cincinnati 2, winning 3–1.

== Stadium ==
The club plans to play at a new stadium to be located on the waterfront at a former dog-racing track; stadium plans were approved by the Bridgeport government in November 2023. In October 2025, the Connecticut Mirror reported that the club would launch before their stadium was ready and play their inaugural season at different venues around the state. In April 2026, the team announced it had signed a lease to play at Dodd Stadium in Norwich beginning in 2027.

== Academy ==
The club's academy teams play in MLS Next. The inaugural season for the U14 and U16 teams was the fall 2024 season.

At the 2025 MLS Next Fest, the club's U15 team became the first team from the state of Connecticut to qualify for the Generation Adidas Cup, defeating Chattanooga FC in the MLS NEXT Pro GA Cup Qualifier Championship.

== Players and staff ==
=== Current roster ===
As of January 29, 2026

Note: Flags indicate national team as defined under FIFA eligibility rules; some limited exceptions apply. Players may hold more than one non-FIFA nationality.

No.	Pos.	Nation	Player
1	GK	MEX	Anthony Ramos
3	DF	ESA	Nelson Rodriguez
4	DF	USA	Richard Hauth
5	DF	FIN	Michael Boamah
7	FW	HUN	Barnabás Tanyi
8	MF	UGA	Steven Sserwadda (on loan from New York Red Bulls II)
9	FW	BRA	Cauã Paixão
11	FW	PAN	Ernesto Gómez
12	DF	USA	Lukas Kamrath
13	MF	PHI	Alex Monis (captain)
14	MF	USA	Dylan Lacy
15	DF	USA	Jahvar Stephenson

No.	Pos.	Nation	Player
17	DF	USA	Warren Agostoni
18	MF	USA	Sean Petrie
20	DF	SEN	Justin Malou
21	DF	USA	Rickson van Hees
22	DF	BRB	Andre Applewhaite
23	GK	USA	Gunther Rankenburg
24	MF	USA	Daniel D'lppolito
27	FW	ENG	Laurie Goddard
31	FW	USA	Robbie Mora
70	FW	HAI	Bryan Destin (on loan from NK Tabor Sezana)
99	MF	USA	Hivan Kouonang
—	MF	USA	Jamison Ping (on loan from Phoenix Rising FC)

== See also ==
- Hartford Athletic
- Hartford City FC
- Elm City Express
- AC Connecticut
