= Andre Applewhaite =

Barbadian footballer (born 2002)

Personal information
- Full name: Andre Applewhaite
- Date of birth: 3 June 2002 (age 24)
- Place of birth: Barbados
- Position: Left back

Team information
- Current team: CT United FC

Youth career
- Notre Dame SC

Senior career*
Years	Team	Apps	(Gls)
2018	Notre Dame SC	16	(0)
2018–2025	Weymouth Wales	7	(0)
2026–	Connecticut United	22	(4)

International career^{‡}
2018–	Barbados	29	(3)
- * Club domestic league appearances and goals as of 16 August 2026 ‡ National team caps and goals as of 16 June 2026

Andre Applewhaite (born 3 June 2002) is a Barbadian professional footballer who plays as a left back for CT United FC.

== International career ==
=== International goals ===
Scores and results list Barbados's goal tally first.

No.	Date	Venue	Opponent	Score	Result	Competition
1.	7 September 2024	Bethlehem Soccer Stadium, Upper Bethlehem, U.S. Virgin Islands	Bahamas	3–2	3–2	2024–25 CONCACAF Nations League C
2.	15 October 2024	Wildey Turf, Wildey, Barbados	Bahamas	1–1	6–2	2024–25 CONCACAF Nations League C
3.	15 October 2024	Wildey Turf, Wildey, Barbados	Bahamas	5–2	6–2	2024–25 CONCACAF Nations League C
