= 2000 NCAA Division I men's soccer tournament =

Men's College Cup (semifinals & final)

Tournament details
- Country: United States
- Teams: 32

Final positions
- Champions: Connecticut (2nd title)
- Runners-up: Creighton (1st title game)

Tournament statistics
- Matches played: 31
- Attendance: 52,910 (1,707 per match)
- Top goal scorer(s): Mohamed Fahim, SMU (5); Corey Woolfolk, Stanford (5)

Awards
- Best player: Darin Lewis, Connecticut (MOP offense); Chris Gbandi, Connecticut (MOP defense)

The 2000 NCAA Division I men's soccer tournament was the 41st organized men's college soccer tournament by the National Collegiate Athletic Association, to determine the top college soccer team in the United States. The Connecticut Huskies won their second national title by defeating the Creighton Bluejays in the championship game, 2–0. The semifinals and final were played in Charlotte, North Carolina at Ericsson Stadium for the second straight year. All other games were played at the home field of the higher seeded team.

== Seeded Teams ==
National seeds
Seed	School	Record
#1	North Carolina	19–2
#2	Clemson	13–3–2
#3	Stanford	16–2–1
#4	San Diego	15–1–2
#5	Virginia	15–5–1
#6	SMU	17–4
#7	South Carolina	12–3–3
#8	San Jose State	20–0–1

== Bracket ==
First round
1	North Carolina (OT)	3
William & Mary	2
Rhode Island	3
Boston College	0
Washington (4OT)	1
UAB	0
Indiana	4
8	San Jose State	0
5	Virginia (2OT)	5
Lehigh	0
James Madison	0
St. John's (NY)	1
Ohio State	0
Creighton	1
UCLA	0
4	San Diego	1
3	Stanford	4
Cal State Fullerton	0
UI Chicago	1
Bradley	0
Saint Louis	0
Kentucky (pen.)	0
IUPUI	0
6	SMU	2
7	South Carolina	0
Duke	1
Brown	2
Vermont	0
Dartmouth	0
Connecticut	3
Furman	2
2	Clemson	3

Second round
1	North Carolina	3
Rhode Island	1
Washington	1
Indiana	2
5	Virginia	2
St. John's (NY)	1
Creighton	3
4	San Diego	0
3	Stanford	6
UI Chicago	0
Kentucky	1
6	SMU	3
Duke	0
Brown	1
Connecticut (OT)	2
2	Clemson	1

Third round
1	North Carolina	0
Indiana	1
5	Virginia	0
Creighton	3
3	Stanford	1
6	SMU	2
Brown	0
Connecticut	1

Semifinals
Indiana	1
Creighton (3OT)	2
6	SMU	0
Connecticut	2

Championship; Ericsson Stadium; Charlotte, North Carolina
Creighton	0
Connecticut	2

== Final ==
December 10, 2000

Creighton	0–2	UConn
	Report 2	Gbandi 16'; Lewis 85'

Ericsson Stadium, Charlotte, NC
Attendance: 11,421
Referee: Paul Tamberino

Team details

Creighton
UConn

GK	1	Gabb
DF	6	Wagenfuhr
DF	7	Henning
DF	8	Peercy
DF	22	Reddington
MF	4	Hammett
MF	16	Wieland
MF	10	Mintah
MF	11	Mullan
FW	14	Tranchilla
FW	24	Sawarynski

GK	18	Hancock
DF	6	Thornton
DF	4	Gbandi
DF	23	Zieky
DF	12	Vargas
MF	22	Ndiaye
MF	10	Rahim
MF	19	Fernandes
FW	8	Lewis
FW	11	Pecorelli
FW	21	Cuellar
