= John M. Squire =

English biophysicist (1945–2021)

John M Squire
- Born: John Michael Squire; 27 June 1945
- Died: 31 January 2021 (aged 75); Salisbury, England
- Education: King's College London
- Occupations: Professor of Structural Biophysics in the University of London; Visiting Professor of Biomedical Sciences at Imperial College London; Research fellow at University of Bristol

John Michael Squire (27 June 1945 – 31 January 2021) was a British professor of structural biophysics in the University of London, a visiting professor at Imperial College London and a research fellow at the University of Bristol, where he researched muscle contraction and blood vessel glycocalyx structure. He was a Fellow of both the Institute of Physics and the Society of Biology. He was an emeritus member of the US Biophysical Society and an honorary member of the British Biophysical Society.

He died from COVID-19 in January 2021, amidst the COVID-19 pandemic in England.

== Education ==
Squire attended Fettes College, Edinburgh, and obtained a B.Sc. (physics, 1966), AKC and PhD (biophysics, 1969) from King's College, University of London, UK, the latter under the supervision of Arthur Elliott.

== Career ==
Squire started his career as a senior lecturer at the Biophysics Institute, Aarhus University, Denmark in 1969 followed by a brief period in the Zoology Department at Oxford University. In 1972, he moved to Imperial College of Science, Technology and Medicine in London, UK, to head the Biopolymer Group. He remained at Imperial College until his official retirement in 2006, when he was head of the Biological Structure and Function Section of what was then the Biomedical Sciences Division at Imperial College. He was made Professor of Structural Biophysics in the University of London in 1995. His final position was as honorary research fellow in the Department of Physiology & Pharmacology at Bristol University, UK, and as a visiting professor at Imperial College London, UK.

== Research ==
The main focus of his research was on the structural basis of muscle contraction. His early contributions were the proposal of the steric blocking mechanism for the regulation of muscle contraction, the discovery of face (side) polarity in the myosin filaments of vertebrate smooth muscle, and the proposal of a general packing scheme of myosin molecules within the myosin filaments of all muscles. He was an expert on the X-ray diffraction analysis of static and contracting muscle, and recently had been involved in the structure analysis of isolated myosin and actin filaments by electron microscopy and single particle analysis. He founded and chaired both the Collaborative Computational Project Number 13 (CCP13) for the analysis of fibre X-ray diffraction data and the Imperial Muscle Initiative (IMI). With Professor David Parry (biophysicist) he initiated and organised the first five Workshops on Coiled-coils, Collagen and Co-proteins held every four years in Alpbach, Austria. In 2002 a special issue of the Journal of Structural Biology based on one of these Alpbach Workshops and co-edited by Squire won the Best Professional/ Scholarly Publishing Journal: Medicine Award. Squire published well over 100 original papers, together with many reviews and in 1981 a 700-page monograph on The Structural Basis of Muscular Contraction. He also wrote or edited several other books on muscle and on fibrous proteins. His final works were on the unresolved problem of how myosin and actin molecules interact to bring about muscle contraction, as well as the structure and function of the blood vessel glycocalyx.
