= Joe Morrone =

American soccer coach (1935–2015)

Joseph John Morrone Jr (October 20, 1935 – September 16, 2015) was an American head men's collegiate soccer coach. He is the father of former soccer midfielder Joseph "Joe" M. Morrone He coached soccer at the University of Connecticut from 1969 to 1996 and is credited with transforming UConn's struggling soccer program into one of the nation's best. Morrone won the 1981 NCAA Division I Men's Soccer Championship at UConn. From 1981 to 1983, his teams reached the Final Four three times. His teams reached the NCAA tournament 16 out of the past 18 years he coached there.

Despite this success, from 1989 to 1996, his teams failed to reach the NCAA tournament, and he was asked to step down. He was replaced by another coaching legend, Ray Reid. UConn's soccer stadium, Morrone Stadium, is named after him. His career coaching record stands at 422–199–64. Morrone died on September 16, 2015, at the age of 79 from pancreatic cancer.
