= UConn Huskies men's soccer =

American college soccer team

- Founded: 1939; 87 years ago
- University: University of Connecticut
- Head coach: Chris Gbandi
- Conference: Big East
- Location: Mansfield, Connecticut, US
- Stadium: Morrone Stadium (5,100)
- Nickname: Huskies
- Colors: National flag blue and white
Home	Away

NCAA tournament championships
- 1981, 2000

NCAA tournament Semifinals
- 1960, 1981, 1982, 1983, 1999, 2000

NCAA tournament Quarterfinals
- 1974, 1976, 1978, 1980, 1981, 1982, 1983, 1999, 2000, 2002, 2007, 2011, 2012, 2013

NCAA tournament appearances
- 1960, 1966, 1972, 1973, 1974, 1975, 1976, 1978, 1979, 1980, 1981, 1982, 1983, 1984, 1985, 1987, 1988, 1989, 1998, 1999, 2000, 2001, 2002, 2003, 2004, 2005, 2007, 2008, 2009, 2010, 2011, 2012, 2013, 2015, 2018, 2025

Conference tournament championships
- 1983, 1984, 1989, 1999, 2004, 2005, 2007

Conference regular season championships
- 1985, 1987, 1988, 1989, 1998, 1999, 2000, 2001, 2005, 2007, 2009, 2012

The UConn Huskies men's soccer team is an intercollegiate varsity sports team of the University of Connecticut. The team is a member of the Big East Conference of the National Collegiate Athletic Association (NCAA).

== History ==
Connecticut soccer existed prior to 1969, but was not considered a major sport and did not even have a real stadium. However, in 1969, Joe Morrone was hired as head coach, and made significant changes that would make the Huskies a premiere program. He started by building Connecticut Soccer Stadium, which now bears his name as Joseph J. Morrone Stadium. Eventually, in Morrone's words, the team became "the Notre Dame of college soccer". Morrone would ultimately coach the team until he retired in 1994.

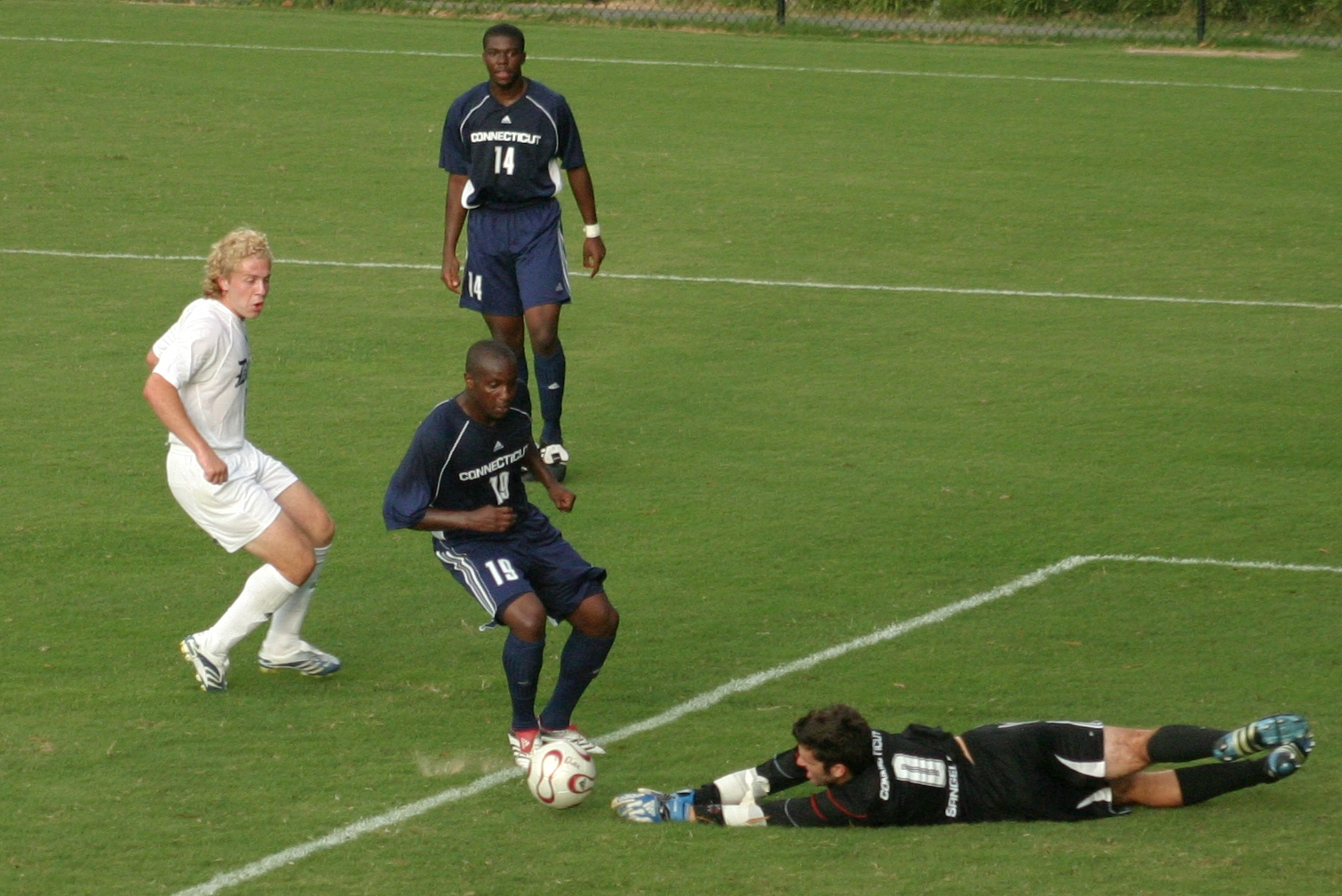
UConn (in blue) v Duke in 2006

In 1981, the Huskies won their first NCAA-sanctioned College Cup, defeating Alabama A&M 2–1 in overtime at Stanford Stadium in Stanford, California. The Huskies also won a title in 1948, although that was before the NCAA. The Huskies, under coach Ray Reid, would win their second title in 2000, beating Creighton 2–0 in Charlotte.

However, in the latter part of the 2000s decade, the Huskies struggled in the NCAA Tournament, losing their openers on penalty kicks in both 2009 and 2010. The Huskies would advance to the 2011 Quarterfinals, but PKs would once again prove to be their undoing, losing to Charlotte at home in a shootout.

UConn's student section is known as the Goal Patrol, and as of 2007, it is the largest in America with 540 members. The Goal Patrol is known for being very rowdy, and has made Morrone Stadium one of the toughest places to play. In 2011, College Soccer News ranked the rivalry between UConn and St. John's as the sixth best college soccer rivalry in America. Two Uconn players have been selected first overall by the MLS SuperDraft in consecutive years, Andre Blake in 2014 and MLS Rookie of the Year Award winner Cyle Larin in 2015. While other players such as Sergio Campbell (2015), Carlos Alvarez (2nd overall 2013), Andrew Jean-Baptiste, Tony Cascio in 2012 and Hermann Trophy winner O'Brian White in 2009 have been other recent MLS SuperDraft selections. Two UConn players were selected first overall by the North American Soccer League (NASL) in consecutive years, Joe Morrone, Jr. in 1981 and Pedro DeBrito in 1982.

== Stadium ==
UConn plays its home games at Morrone Stadium, a 5,100-capacity soccer-specific stadium in Storrs, Connecticut.

== Head coaches ==
=== Coaching history ===
Tenure	Coach	Years	Record	Pct.
1928	Roy Guyer	1	2–1–0	.500
1929	Jack Seman	1	0–4–0	.000
1930–31	Billie Darrow	2	1–12–2	.133
1932–36	Jack Dennerley	5	11–27–0	.289
1937–41	John Squires	5	15–26–1	.360
1942	Carl Fischer	1	3–6–0	.333
1946–68	John Squires	23	133–114–14	.536
1969–96	Joe Morrone	28	358–178–53	.653
1997–2021	Ray Reid	19	267–92–56	.711
2022–present	Chris Gbandi	4	36-24-14	–

== Titles ==
=== National ===
Championship	#	Season	Score	Rival	Venue
NCAA tournament	1	1981	2–1 (a.e.t.)	Alabama A&M	Stanford Stadium
NCAA tournament	2	2000	2–0	Creighton	Eriksson Stadium

=== Conference ===
Championship	Titles	Winning years
Big East tournament	7	1983, 1984, 1989, 1999, 2004, 2005, 2007
Big East regular season	12	1985, 1987, 1988, 1989, 1998, 1999, 2000, 2001, 2005, 2007, 2009, 2012
