= Morrone Stadium =

American college stadium

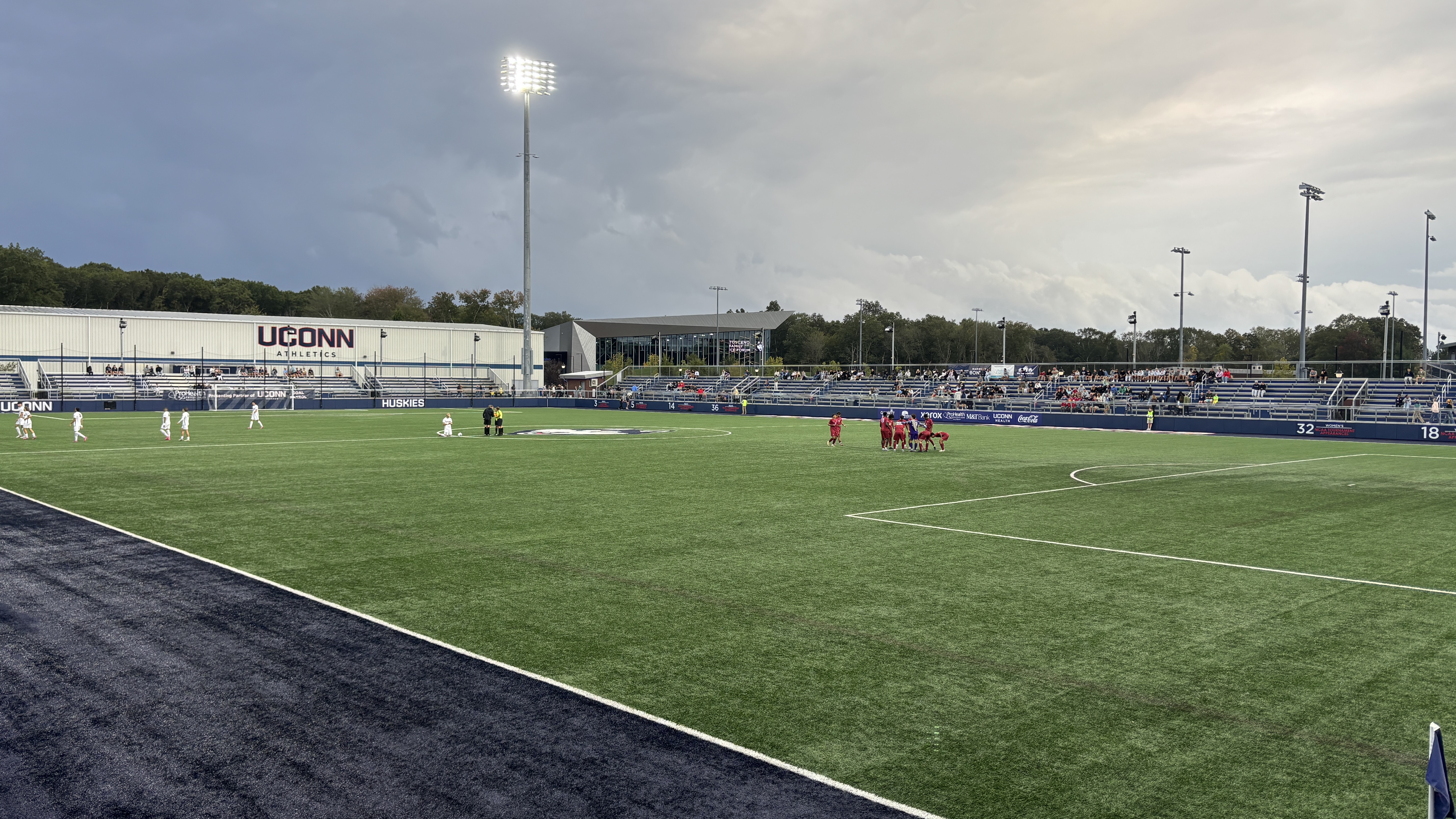
- Just before a soccer game at Morrone Stadium in September 2025
- Interactive map of Morrone Stadium
- Full name: Joseph J. Morrone Stadium at Rizza Performance Center
- Former names: Connecticut Soccer Stadium (1969–1999)
- Address: Storrs, CT; United States
- Coordinates: 41°48′4″N 72°15′18″W
- Owner: University of Connecticut
- Operator: UConn Athletics
- Capacity: 5,300
- Type: Stadium
- Surface: FieldTurf Core-2
- Scoreboard: one electronic scoreboard
- Record attendance: List: 5,495 on December 8, 2007 vs. Virginia Tech (post-2002 contraction); 9,200 on October 24, 1982 vs. Alabama A&M (all-time), 6,090 on September 26, 1999 vs. Syracuse (women's all-time); 2,308 vs. Notre Dame on October 13, 2006 (women's post-contraction)
- Field size: 75 x 120 yards
- Current use: Soccer; Lacrosse

Construction
- Built: 1969
- Opened: 1969; 57 years ago
- Renovated: 1994, 2002, 2008, 2009

Tenants
- Connecticut Huskies (NCAA) teams: men's and women's soccer; women's lacrosse

Website
- uconnhuskies.com/morrone-stadium

Morrone Stadium, officially known as Joseph J. Morrone Stadium at Rizza Performance Center is an on-campus stadium at University of Connecticut in Storrs, Connecticut used primarily for soccer and lacrosse.

The 5,100-seat stadium was built in 1969. and has undergone many renovations since. The stadium hosts the school's men's and women's soccer and women's lacrosse programs.

The stadium is named after Joseph Morrone, Hall of Fame soccer coach, who led the Connecticut men's team from 1969 to 1996, winning the NCAA national championship in 1981.

== History ==
Morrone Stadium was built in 1969, and was at the time known as "Connecticut Soccer Stadium". Before that, UConn soccer was largely unknown and unpopular. However, at the urging of newly hired soccer and lacrosse coach Joe Morrone (whose name the stadium now bears), a new stadium was built for the team. The stadium has had a capacity as high as 8,574 but it was restructured in 1994 and again in 2002 to seat 5,564. In 2008, it was again restructured to seat 4,407. In 2009, Morrone Stadium was expanded slightly to 4,500. As of the 2015 season the current capacity is 5,100. In 1997, the board of trustees voted to change the name of the stadium to honor Morrone, who had just retired after coaching soccer for 28 years at UConn.

The stadium was officially renamed in 1999 to "Joseph J. Morrone Stadium". In 2008, the Division of Athletics proposed to build a new basketball practice facility on the site of Morrone, but that was later changed and it will now be built where the vacant Memorial Stadium now is.

Morrone Stadium was the original home of the women's lacrosse team as well, when it was founded in 1997. However, the team began to play some, and eventually all, of its games at the Sherman Family-Sports Complex. The last lacrosse game at Morrone was in 2009 against the Rutgers Scarlet Knights, which was the first time the team played there in three years.

On October 13, 2014, it was announced the former UConn men's soccer student-athlete Tony Rizza ’87 (BUS) has pledged a total of $8 million to transform the soccer complex and build a new soccer stadium on the Storrs campus. The new facility will be built on the site of the current Joseph J. Morrone Stadium and will bear the same name. In February 2017, UConn announced a proposed plan for a new stadium with the potential to break ground in the spring of 2018.

== Description ==
The listed capacity of Morrone Stadium is 5,100. There is one electronic scoreboard behind the south goal, which is capability of displaying the time, score and shots for both teams, as well as limited messages. The natural grass surface measures 120 x 75 yards. Long metal bleachers line both sides of the field, and there is also a small set of bleachers behind the south goal.

Standing-room areas are located behind the north goal and are typically occupied by students in the "Goal Patrol," the official student supporters group for University of Connecticut soccer. As of 2007, the group had 540 members. In 2011, Soccer America ranked Morrone Stadium fifth nationally for atmosphere among college soccer venues.

== Location ==
Like many of the University of Connecticut Athletic Facilities, Morrone Stadium is located on Stadium Road, right next to Mark Edward Freitas Ice Forum, which is home to the women's ice hockey team. It is also across the street from J.O. Christian Field, home of the baseball team. The softball field is nearby, as is the Werth Family UConn Basketball Champions Center and the Sherman Family Sports Complex. Gampel Pavilion, home to the men's and women's basketball teams and the women's volleyball team is located around the corner as well.

== Notable events and games ==
On September 26, 1999, 6,070 fans attended the women's soccer game against the Syracuse Orangemen. At the time, this was a record for attendance at a regular season women's college soccer game. Additionally, Morrone Stadium has hosted various soccer tournaments. On November 11 and 13, 2005, Morrone Stadium hosted the 2005 Big East Soccer Tournament semifinals and finals. The regular-season co-champion Huskies defeated the South Florida Bulls 1–0. It also hosted the semifinals and final of the 2006 Big East Women's Tournament, the 2007 Big East Men'sTournament, and the 2009 Women's Big East Tournament.

On February 9, 2011, the Big East Conference announced Morrone Stadium would again host the final two rounds of the Women's conference tournament in 2012, its first tournament in three years. However, as a result of logistical issues related to postponements caused by Hurricane Sandy, the tournament was moved to Rentschler Field in East Hartford. The stadium would later host the semifinals and final of the 2014 American Athletic Conference men's soccer tournament, where the Tulsa Golden Hurricane defeated USF 6–5 on penalty kicks after a scoreless draw. Morrone has also hosted several games of the opening rounds of the Big East, American Athletic Conference, and NCAA Tournaments for both sexes, although those are typically played at the site of the higher seed.

=== Men's soccer sellouts ===
Note: Attendance goes back to the 2007 Season.

Date	Rival	Score	Att.
Sep 24, 2011	St. John's	2–0	5,100
Oct 22, 2011	Georgetown	0–0	5,100
Dec 4, 2011	Charlotte (Note: NCAA Division I men's soccer tournament game.)	1–1	5,100
Aug 8, 2012	St. Francis	1–0	5,100
Sep 22, 2012	St. John's	3–0	5,100
Sep 29, 2012	Notre Dame	2–1	5,100
Oct 27, 2012	Providence	2–0	5,100
Dec 2, 2012	Creighton	0–1	5,100
Aug 31, 2015	Quinnipiac	0–0	5,100
Oct 17, 2015	UCF	2–1	5,100
Aug 28, 2016	Omaha	2–0	5,100
Oct 15, 2016	South Florida	0–1	5,100
Aug 22, 2022	Holy Cross	2–1	5,212
